= Amala Chebolu =

Indian playback singer

- Born: Vizag, Andhra Pradesh, India
- Occupation: Singer
- Years active: 2014–present
- Parent(s): Gopalakrishna Murthy, Saraswathi Chebolu

Amala Chebolu is a playback singer in the Telugu film industry, a Carnatic musician, and a voice-over artist.

== Personal life and education ==
Amala Chebolu was born in Hyderabad and grew up in Visakhapatnam, daughter of Saraswathi Chebolu, a vocalist, and Gopalakrishna Murthy.

== Career ==
Amala is a voice-over artist, with dubbing roles in the films Writer Padmabhushan,18 Pages and Cobra. She also did voice-work work on the teasers for Butta Bomma and Sita Ramam.

== Discography ==
Year	Song	Film/Album	Language	Composer
2026	"Kalale Kalale"	Vishwanath & Sons	Telugu	G. V. Prakash Kumar
2026	"Nenante Neeku"	Dev Paaru	Telugu	Osho Venkat
2026	"Ee Hrudayale"	Oh Sukumari	Telugu	Bharath Manchiraju
2026	"Madhura Selate Idu Manju Challi"	Breakfast	Kannada	G. V. Prakash Kumar
2025	"Padipoya"	Padipoya	Telugu	Kasyap
2025	"Kiss Song"	Jack	Telugu	Suresh Bobbili
2025	"Raaja Raaja"	Kingston	Telugu	G. V. Prakash Kumar
2025	"Closer Than Ever"	Mr.Housekeeping	Tamil	Osho Venkat
2024	"Peelings"	Pushpa 2: The Rule	Kannada	Devi Sri Prasad
2024	"Shrimati Avre "	Lucky Baskhar	Kannada	G. V. Prakash Kumar
2024	"Ae Dil Zara "	Auron Mein Kahan Dum Tha	Hindi	M. M. Keeravani
2024	"Raavaali Raa"	Love Me	Telugu	M. M. Keeravani
2023	"College Papa"	Mad	Telugu	Bheems Ceciroleo
2023	"Thori Bori"	Chandramukhi 2	Tamil	M.M. Keeravani
2023	"Thori Bori"	Chandramukhi 2	Telugu	M.M. Keeravani
2023	"Wild Saala"	Agent	Telugu	Bheems Ceciroleo
2022	"Baby Nee Sugar"	Baby Nee Sugar	Tamil	Osho Venkat
2022	“Nadichaa Nadichaa”	1996 Dharmapuri	Telugu	Osho Venkat
2021	"Godari Valle Sandhamama"	Arjuna Phalguna	Telugu	Priyadarshan Balasubramanian
2021	"Raave Raave"	Arjuna Phalguna	Telugu	Priyadarshan Balasubramanian
2021	"What to Do"	Varudu Kaavalenu	Telugu	Vishal Chandrashekhar
2020	"Nuvve"	Nuvve	Telugu	Samuel
2020	"Nee Roopam Edurugaa	Johaar	Telugu	Priyadarshan Balasubramanian
2020	"Whattey Beauty"	Bheeshma	Telugu	Mahati Swara Sagar
2014	"Kalayedo Nijamedo"	Maaya	Telugu	Sekhar Chandra
2014	"Mana Prema"	Janaki Kalipindi Iddarini	Telugu	Gautham Dany Kanaparthi
2014	"Merupu Theega"	Vikramarkudi Love Story	Telugu	Vishwanath Ghantasala

== Filmography ==
=== Voice artist ===
Year	Movie	Dubbing for	Language	Notes
2026	Srinivasa Mangapuram	Rasha Thadani	Telugu	
2026	Raja the Raja	Vishakha Dhiman	Telugu	
2026	Bad Boy Karthik	Vidhi Yadav	Telugu	
2026	Raakaasa	Nayan Sarika	Telugu	
2026	Vishnu Vinyasam	Nayan Sarika	Telugu	
2026	Euphoria	Sara Arjun	Telugu	
2025	Andhra King Taluka	Bhagyashri Borse	Telugu	
2025	Gatha Vaibhava	Ashika Ranganath	Telugu	
2025	Telusu Kada	Srinidhi Shetty	Telugu	
2025	Kingdom	Bhagyashri Borse	Telugu	
2025	Final Destination Bloodlines	Anna Lore	Telugu	
2023	Writer Padmabhushan	Tina Shilparaj	Telugu	
2023	Butta Bomma	Anikha Surendran	Telugu	for the teaser
2023	Mad	Ananthika Sanilkumar	Telugu	
2023	Tiger Nageswara Rao	Nupur Sanon	Telugu	
2022	18 Pages	Anupama Parameswaran	Telugu	for the overseas print
2022	Cobra	Meenakshi Govindarajan	Telugu	
2022	Sita Ramam	Mrunal Thakur	Telugu	for the teaser
