= Filmfare Award for Best Female Debut – South =

Award for South Indian films

- Awarded for: Best Debut Performance by an Actress
- Country: India
- Presented by: Filmfare
- First award: Simran for Once More, V. I. P. and Nerrukku Ner (1998)
- Currently held by: Nayan Sarika for Gam Gam Ganesha (2024); Sri Gouri Priya for Lover; Methil Devika for Kadha Innuvare; Bindu Shivaram for Kerebete; (2024)

The Filmfare Award for Best Female Debut is presented by the Filmfare magazine as part of its annual Filmfare Awards South for South Indian films.

== Superlatives ==
The award has recognized performances of actresses in four major languages. They are:

- Tamil (15 winners)
- Telugu (8 winners)
- Malayalam (7 winners)
- Kannada (4 winners)

== Recipients ==
Year	Actress	Film(s)	Language(s)	Ref.
1997	Simran	Once More, V. I. P. and Nerrukku Ner	Tamil	
1998	Isha Koppikar	Kadhal Kavithai	Tamil	
1999	Jyothika	Vaalee	Tamil	
2001	Reema Sen	Minnale	Tamil	
2005	Padmapriya Janakiraman	Thavamai Thavamirundhu	Tamil	
2006	Ileana D'Cruz	Devadasu	Telugu	
2007	Hansika Motwani	Desamuduru	Telugu	
2007	Anjali	Kattradhu Thamizh	Tamil	
2008	Meera Nandan	Mulla	Malayalam	
2009	Abhinaya	Naadodigal	Tamil	
2010	Samantha Ruth Prabhu	Ye Maaya Chesave	Telugu	
2011	Shruti Haasan	7 Aum Arivu	Tamil	
2011	Shruti Haasan	Anaganaga O Dheerudu	Telugu	
2012	Shwetha Srivatsav	Cyber Yugadol Nava Yuva Madhura Prema Kavyam	Kannada	
2012	Lakshmi Menon	Sundarapandian	Tamil	
2013	Nazriya Nazim	Neram	Tamil	
2014	Catherine Tresa	Madras	Tamil	
2014	Nikki Galrani	1983	Malayalam	
2015	Pragya Jaiswal	Kanche	Telugu	
2015	Sai Pallavi	Premam	Malayalam	
2016	Manjima Mohan	Achcham Yenbadhu Madamaiyada	Tamil	
2017	Aishwarya Lekshmi	Mayaanadhi	Malayalam	
2017	Kalyani Priyadarshan	Hello	Telugu	
2018	Raiza Wilson	Pyaar Prema Kaadhal	Tamil	
2018	Saniya Iyappan	Queen	Malayalam	
2019	AWARDS FUNCTION WAS SUSPENDED DUE TO COVID-19 PANDEMIC			
2020–21	Krithi Shetty	Uppena	Telugu	
2020–21	Dhanya Ramkumar	Ninna Sanihake	Kannada	
2020–21	Anaga Narayananan	Thinkalazhcha Nishchayam	Malayalam	
2022	Aditi Shankar	Viruman	Tamil	
2023	Amrutha Prem	Tagaru Palya	Kannada	
2024	Nayan Sarika	Aay	Telugu	
2024	Sri Gouri Priya	Lover	Tamil	
2024	Methil Devika	Kadha Innuvare	Malayalam	
2024	Bindu Shivaram	Kerebete	Kannada	
