= Viswam (film) =

Indian action comedy film

- Theatrical release poster
- Directed by: Sreenu Vaitla
- Written by: Sreenu Vaitla (Story/Dialogues) Gopimohan; Bhanu-Nandu; Praveen Verma (Screenplay)
- Produced by: Venu Donepudi; T. G. Vishwa Prasad; Vivek Kuchibotla; Kondal Jinna
- Starring: Gopichand; Kavya Thapar
- Cinematography: K. V. Guhan
- Edited by: Amar Reddy Kudumula
- Music by: Chaitan Bharadwaj; Bheems Ceciroleo
- Production companies: Chitralayam Studios; People Media Factory
- Release date: 11 October 2024
- Running time: 154 minutes
- Country: India
- Language: Telugu
- Box office: ₹19.02 crore

Viswam (transl. The Universe) is a 2024 Indian Telugu-language action comedy film co-written and directed by Sreenu Vaitla while Gopimohan, Bhanu-Nandu and Praveen Verma wrote the screenplay. The film is produced by Chitralayam Studios and People Media Factory. The film stars Gopichand and Kavya Thapar. The soundtrack and background score were composed by Chaitan Bharadwaj and Bheems Ceciroleo, while the cinematography and editing were handled by K. V. Guhan and Amar Reddy Kudumula, respectively.

== Plot ==
The movie opens with a random guy coming to a restaurant and causing a bomb blast using a remote. The scene then shifts to SSR College of Science and Technology where professors are talking about the blast in a meeting meanwhile news reports that he was a student and police have identified him. After the meeting, Bachiraju (Sunil) who is the brother of central minister Seethamrama Raju (Suman) and chairman of SSR college meets with one of the professors Amarnath Sastry (Jisshu Sengupta) and argues that he used the material from his chemical factory and student from his college and worries that the police might arrest him. Then Amarnath reveals that he is Jalaluddin Qureshi, an ISIS terrorist and he plans to cause series of terrorist attacks across the country.

Meanwhile, another professor Faruq (Shafi) was suspicious about Qureshi and placed a secret spy camera in the room and they found it. He immediately calls the minister and informs about everything. The minister asks to gather the evidence and meet him at the farm house. Qureshi and Bachiraju corner Faruq and kill him. They then bribe the security of the minister and also kill him which was witnessed by a small girl named Darshana. She reveals this to her grandfather about the assassination. He calls his son Karthik (Shaam) and informs about this. He advices not to go to police and wait for him till he returns from his duties and not to send her anywhere. Kashmir DIG Kailash Satyardhi (Mukesh Rishi) has revealed that they had raided a terrorist's house and confiscated huge amounts of RDX. Qureshi informs to Bachiraju that he is going there for urgent business and orders him to find the girl and kill her.

Darshana's uncle mangoes Sarma (Naresh) and aunt Kasturi (Pragathi) are money-minded, lying and manipulative people, who request them to visit a holy place for their own gain. Bachiraju with the advice of his PA Deekshitulu (Rahul Ramakrishna) hires a few goons to kill the girl; they find them and attack them. Gopi Reddy (Gopichand), a humble guy who adores his father comes and saves them and Darshana's grandfather reveals to Gopi that she is a witness and her life is in threat. He vows to protect her out of concern.

Jali Reddy (Prudhvi Raj) is the brother of Bulli Reddy (Raghu Babu), and is tormented by the apartment's tenants as his brother had cheated them and ran away with the money. Gopi introduces to him as his nephew and explains that he is here to make things right. The apartments tenants furiously and bad-mouths Gopi's father and beats them up and asks for the land documents of his father which is now valued over 400 crores else they have to pay up the rest of the money. They back down and he makes his uncles's life luxurious again.

He then reveals to Jali Reddy that he is here to find his girlfriend Samira (Kavya Thapar). Sarma and Kasturi invite Jali and Gopi for lunch where he finds out that they are Samira's parents when Samira's PA Raju (Master Bharath).

Past: Samira was a costume designer and came to Milan for costume shopping and met her there. She is money-minded and states that her father is suffering from cancer, and she is trying to save for his treatment. Gopi hates cheaters and eventually finds out about her cheating and warns her to pay up but she refuses and blackmails, that she will file false cases against him for assault. He lets them go and warns her he will get his revenge. She was then kidnapped by traffickers, he comes to the rescue, and she has a change of heart and wanted to propose to him before leaving Milan. She asks him to collect a necklace and meet her at the airport but he doesn't show up and realises she was cheated and leaves to India.

Present: Gopi returns her things and explains he was caught up at work. Darshana was again attacked and Gopi saved her. The commissioner then gets involved takes away their phone and gives them another encrypted mobile. They were then shifted to an unknown island in Goa. Later it was revealed that he was working with Qureshi and gives him their location. Gopi again saves Darshana by tracking her using the watch he gifted for her birthday. He kills Qureshi's brother not before he shot the girl. She was rushed to the hospital and saved not knowing the commissioner is involved they inform him about the condition. The terrorist, furious of his brother's murder reaches Goa to kill them. Commissioner advices to send their flight details so that they can arrange security. However, they send him flight details, but board the train as to let them know their whereabouts. Qureshi observes all this and when he was about to board the train, he was arrested mistakenly. His gang boards the train next day and release him. Gopi along with everyone escape the train into the woods. He advices Darshana's grandfather to go to the NIA office and call him.He fights off the remaining terrorists Gopi revels his past Samira and her family.

Past: Gopi's real name is Viswam, and his family was killed by terrorists while going for a pilgrimage. He was then adopted by Kailash Satyardhi and his family. He later joined the police force in the Anti-Terrorist division and took out many people. His adoptive sister Priya Satyardhi (Priya Vadlamani) joined the army. Then busted the huge RDX and went out stash it somewhere in a warehouse. Then Qureshi attacks DIG's home, kills him and his wife and injures his daughter. Gopi seeks revenge, traces the people responsible for their murder to Milan and other countries along with his friend Karthik and Vamsi.During the final assassination Vamsi and Karthik were shot; the latter was presumed to be dead. He feels guilty about his death and knows about Darshana's condition comes to help her.

Present: Samira and her family feel bad for Darshana as she also lost her mother at birth due to breast cancer as she refused to take chemotherapy for the sake of pregnancy. Viswam finds out that Qureshi has Darshana. He goes to save her, but Qureshi ambushes him and chains him up. He tells Darshana's grandfather to kill Viswam with his own hands and reveals that Viswam has killed their son else he won't let Darshana live. He stabs Viswam with a knife. He tries to double-cross them while soldiers led by Priya come to their rescue. It was later revealed that Karthik was alive as Qureshi has treated him for his injuries for information and tortured him about the location of the RDX. Viswam kills everyone and was about to kill Qureshi were he reveals that his mission won't die as there are so many people. He brags about that they will never find them. Meanwhile they find his laptop and crack it open for details and revealed to him that they have known his plan after the second attack on Darshana. They killed him and Bachiraju was arrested while Deekshitulu confesses to everything.

== Cast ==
- Gopichand as Viswam IPS / Baddam Gopi Reddy; recruited to NIA later collaborated with Anti-Terrorist Squad
- Kavya Thapar as Samira Sarma, Sarma's daughter
- Jisshu Sengupta as Jalaluddin Qureshi, Pakistan ISI Agent, who disguised with the name of Sanjay Sharma; the main antagonist
- Sunil as Bachiraju, Qureshi's aid; a traitor
- Naresh as Sarma, Samira's father
- Pragathi as Kasthuri, Samira's mother
- Shaam as Major Karthik, Anti-Terrorist Squad Member; colleague to Viswam (Cameo Appearance)
- Anisha Ambrose as Meera, Karthik's wife (Cameo Appearance)
- Priya Vadlamani as Captain Priya Satyardhi, Viswam's Adopted sister (Cameo Appearance)
- VTV Ganesh as Ticket Collector
- Vennela Kishore as Suresh Gopi
- Srikanth Iyengar as a political strategist to Bachiraju
- Rahul Ramakrishna as Deekshitulu; Bachiraju's PA.
- Prudhvi Raj as Baddam Jali Reddy
- Mukesh Rishi as DIG Kailash Satyardhi; Viswam's adopted father
- Ajay Ghosh as SI Vikram Sarma
- Praveen as Viswam's friend
- Master Bharath as Raju, Samira's assistant
- Suman as Central Minister Seetharama Raju, Bachiraju's elder brother
- Raghu Babu as Baddam Bulli Reddy, Jali Reddy's elder brother
- Raghu Karumanchi
- Chammak Chandra
- Shakalaka Shankar
- Gundu Sudarshan
- Gautam Raju
- Banerjee
- Vajja Venkata Giridhar
- Iyal as Darshana

== Production ==
The first filming schedule commenced on 24 September in Italy, and they shot in multiple locations there, including Matera, Milan and Rome. A song sequence was filmed there, as well. Following that, the crew moved to Goa for their next schedule. Afterwards, they shot some scenes in Manali, at the foothills of the Himalayas in January 2024. Thereafter, the cast began shooting in Hyderabad. By the following month, the film had completed approx. 60% of its shoot. In March, the makers announced that People Media Factory would join as co producer of the film with Chitralayam Studios. The teaser was unveiled on 3 September 2024, with the launch event primarily attended by the cast and the technical crew.

== Soundtrack ==
Viswam

Film score by Chaitan Bharadwaj
- Released: 2024
- Studios: RushStudios; Jubilee 10 Studios
- Genre: Feature film soundtrack
- Language: Telugu
- Label: Tips Telugu
- Producer: Chaitan Bharadwaj

Chaitan Bharadwaj chronology
| Harom Hara (2024) | Viswam (2024) |

The soundtrack and the background score were composed by Chaitan Bharadwaj and Bheems Ceciroleo (only one song), in his maiden collaboration with both Gopichand and Srinu Vaitla. The first single, "Moroccan Maguva," was released on 11 September 2024, and is a dance track about the hero's romantic interest. Rakendu Mouli's lyrics have a liberal use of colloquial Hyderabadi lingo, and it is a unique blending of English, Telugu and Urdu. The second single, "Mondi Thalli Pilla Nuvvu" was unveiled thereafter on 24 September, and is a composition about motherly love and affection. The song portrays a mother-daughter relationship in a melodic and heartwarming manner.

Ttrack listing
| No. | Title | Lyrics | Singer(s) | Length |
|---|---|---|---|---|
| 1. | "Moroccan Maguva" | Rakendu Mouli | Prudhvi Chandra, Sahithi Chaganti | 3:35 |
| 2. | "Mondi Thalli Pilla Nuvvu" | Sri Harsha Emani | Sahithi Chaganti | 4:19 |
| 3. | "Vastanu Vastanule" | Vengi | Kapil Kapilan | 2:58 |
| 4. | "Gunguru Gunguru" | Suresh Gangula | Bheems Ceciroleo, Rohini Soratt | 3:38 |

== Release ==
The film was theatrically released on 11 October 2024. Amazon Prime Video has purchased the streaming rights of the film, and the dubbing rights have been sold for ₹12 crore (US$1.2 million).

The Censor Board of Film Certification suggested fourteen cuts to the original version of the film, mainly those that featured moments of gore, violence and offensive dialogue. The film eventually received a U/A certificate from the Censor Board, after making changes to some scenes. According to the British Board of Film Classification, the film received a 15, stating reasons like strong gory violence and injury detail.

== Reception ==
On a similar note, Sangeetha Devi Dundoo of The Hindu wrote, "In terms of narrative style, character arcs and the plot itself, this Gopichand and Kavya Thapar starrer feels redundant. The film teems with dozen of characters and a handful of sub plots — in the name of offering wholesome entertainment — with action episodes, romance, emotional drama and mindless comedy; it can get tiresome to sit through 155 minutes of an incoherence narrative, even if one does not look for logical reasoning."
