= Rukhsar =

Rukhsar is a given name. Notable people with the name include:

- Rukshar Dhillon (born 1993), British actress
- Rukhsar Rehman, Indian actress
