= Road King =

Road King or Road Kings may refer to:

- Road King (Transformers), a fictional character from the Transformers series
- Road King (film), a 2023 Indian Kannada-language film
- Road King FLHR, in the Harley-Davidson FL family of motorcycles
- Road Kings (pinball), a pinball machine made by Williams
- Road Kings, rockabilly band Jesse Dayton
