= Ashoka Vanamlo Arjuna Kalyanam =

- Theatrical release poster
- Directed by: Vidya Sagar Chinta
- Written by: Ravi Kiran Kola
- Produced by: Bhogavalli Bapineedu; Sudheer Edara
- Starring: Vishwak Sen; Rukshar Dhillon; Ritika Nayak
- Cinematography: Pavi K. Pavan
- Edited by: Viplav Nyshadam
- Music by: Jay Krish
- Production company: SVCC Digital
- Release date: 6 May 2022
- Running time: 149 minutes
- Country: India
- Language: Telugu

Ashoka Vanamlo Arjuna Kalyanam (transl. Arjun's wedding in the garden of Ashoka trees) is a 2022 Indian Telugu-language romantic comedy film directed by Vidya Sagar Chinta and written by Ravi Kiran Kola. Produced by SVCC Digital, the film stars Vishwak Sen, Rukshar Dhillon, and Ritika Nayak. The plot follows Arjun Kumar Allam, a 33-year-old bachelor who gets engaged to Madhavi, however, she elopes before the wedding.

The film's editing and cinematography are done by Viplav Nyshadam and Pavi K Pavan respectively. The film's music is composed by Jay Krish. The film was released on 6 May 2022. The film was remade in Tamil as Love Marriage (2025).

== Plot ==
Arjun Kumar Allam is a 33-year-old man from Suryapet in Telangana. As his family is unable to find girls in their community, they get into an alliance with a family in Ashokapuram Village in Andhra Pradesh. They travel to Ashokapuram for the engagement ceremony with Madhavi. Though Arjun is keen to talk to Madhavi, she appears to be shy and less talkative. Madhavi has a younger sister Vasudha, who is more talkative in nature. During the pre-wedding shoot, Arjun notices that Madhavi has tears in her eyes. As Arjun's family is about to leave for their town, the bus breaks down, which makes them stay for a few more days in the same house. Further attempts to leave the house get blocked due to the government imposing a lockdown due to the COVID-19 pandemic.

Arjun drops a paper with his mobile number, and Madhavi chats with him on WhatsApp, which makes him happy. Due to a misunderstanding, Arjun tries to kiss Madhavi, and she slaps him in return. Arjun soon realizes that it is Vasudha who has been chatting with him all this while and he assumed that it was Madhavi. As the elders agree to get them married earlier, Arjun says that he needs some time to agree to the wedding. Vasudha figures out that Arjun was slapped by Madhavi and tries to patch up the misunderstanding. Vasudha gets to know that Madhavi is in love with another guy from her college and their parents have forced her into the engagement. Due to Vasudha, Madhavi talks to Arjun and says sorry. Arjun agrees to the wedding and informs the elders.

The next day, everyone gets a shock as Madhavi elopes with another guy. This creates a rift between the elders on either side. As Arjun's family starts to leave the village on the road, the local MLA Rajaram and police force them back to go back to Madhavi's house due to COVID restrictions, and Rajaram gives clear instructions to the volunteers to get a signature daily from all of them till the COVID restrictions are lifted. An upset Arjun drinks along with his relatives and blasts them for creating rifts. Arjun has a rift with Vasudha, who comes to console him and asks her if she would have married an ordinary guy like Arjun. Vasudha starts thinking about this.

Meanwhile, Arjun's pregnant sister (Vidya Sivalenka) gets pains and is admitted to a hospital. Vasudha helps Arjun with the travel and arranging food for his sister in the hospital. Arjun saves Vasudha from some bad guys in the village market, and Vasudha informs Arjun that she likes him. When asked by Arjun's sister about her marriage, Vasudha tells her that she needs at least three more years as she has a few responsibilities and wanted to clear her family's financial debts. Arjun gets frustrated as he is already 33 and cannot wait for three more years with constant pressure from his parents and relatives. When Vasudha shows Arjun random matrimonial photos, a frustrated Arjun says yes to everyone without even looking at the photo. Vasudha feels bad and tells him to look at the girl next time before leaving her place and his heart will come to a halt if she is the right girl for him.

Arjun's brother-in-law comes to the place with permission slips and facilities to take everyone home. Around the same time, the local police informs Madhavi's father about Madhavi and her lover Vikram. Madhavi's lover tells him that the reason Madhavi left the house was their decision of using caste as a barrier for the wedding. However, Madhavi could not stay long without her father and hence, decided to convince their parents instead. This creates a further rift between the families as Madhavi returns home. The next day, when they start to leave the house, Arjun looks at Vasudha, and he slowly realizes that she is indeed the right girl for him. He stops the car halfway and informs his parents that he wants to marry Vasudha and is ready to wait until Vasudha is ready for the wedding.

Arjun goes back to the village and proposes to Vasudha, indicating that he will wait for her as long as she needs. Vasudha happily agrees, and the marriage takes place after three years.

== Cast ==
- Vishwak Sen as Arjun Kumar Allam
- Rukshar Dhillon as Pasupuleti Madhavi
- Ritika Nayak as Pasupuleti Vasudha, Madhavi's sister, later Arjun's wife
- Kadambari Kiran as Poleti Suribabu, Madhavi's uncle
- Vadlamani Srinivas as Madhavi's father
- Goparaju Ramana as Arjun's uncle
- Kedar Shankar as Arjun's father
- Vidya Sivalenka as Arjun's sister
- Rajkumar Kasireddy as Photographer
- Vennela Kishore as MLA Rajaram
- Kishore Kumar Polimera as Police SI
- Dubbing Janaki as Madhavi's and Vasudha's grandmother
- Ashok Selvan (cameo appearance) as Vikram, Lover turned husband of Madhavi

== Production ==
The film was launched on 16 April 2021 in Hyderabad. It is directed by Vidya Sagar Chinta who previously worked on the films Raja Vaaru Rani Gaaru and Falaknuma Das as cinematographer and story, screenplay, and dialogues were written by Ravi Kiran Kola who's also the showrunner of the film.

== Soundtrack ==
Ashoka Vanamlo Arjuna Kalyanam

Soundtrack album by Jay Krish
- Released: 2022
- Recorded: 2021–2022
- Studios: Vanajkesav digi audio waves, Chennai
- Genre: Feature film soundtrack
- Label: Sony Music India
- Producer: Jay Krish

Jay Krish chronology
Raja Vaaru Rani Gaaru (2019)	Ashoka Vanamlo Arjuna Kalyanam (2022)

The soundtrack of the film is composed by Jay Krish, of Raja Vaaru Rani Gaaru fame.

Tracklist
No.	Title	Lyrics	Singer(s)	Length
1.	"Oo Aadapilla"	Ananta Sriram	Ram Miriyala	5:07
2.	"Sinnavaada"	Sanapati Bharadwaj Patrudu	Ananya Bhat, Gowtham Bharadwaj	3:58
3.	"Ramsilaka"	Vijay Kumar Balla, Ravi Kiran Kola	Ravi Kiran Kola	4:27
4.	"Ee Veduka"	Rehman	Haripriya, Jay Krish	4:36

== Release ==
The film was released in theatres on 6 May 2022 worldwide. The film was digitally premiered on Aha from 3 June 2022

== Reception ==
A reviewer from The Hans India gave the film a rating of 3.5/5 stars and wrote "'Ashoka Vanamlo Arjuna Kalyanam' is a perfect fun-filled family entertainer from Tollywood for this summer. Honest writing, brilliant execution, and genuine performances." Neeshita Nyayapati of The Times of India gave the film a rating of 3/5 stars and wrote "Ashoka Vanamlo Arjuna Kalyanam is one of those films where you see the scenes and are hit with nostalgia". Arvind V of Pinkvilla gave the film a rating of 2.5/5 stars and wrote "Vishwak Sen's awesome act makes this convenient story watchable". Sangeetha Devi Dundoo of The Hindu stated "An effective Vishwak Sen powers this heartwarming story of life and marriage".
