= KA (film) =

2024 Telugu film by Sujith and Sandeep

- Theatrical release poster
- Directed by: Sujith & Sandeep
- Written by: Sujith & Sandeep
- Produced by: Chinta Gopalakrishna Reddy; Chinta Vineesha Reddy; Chinta Rajashekar Reddy
- Starring: Kiran Abbavaram; Nayan Sarika; Tanvi Ram
- Cinematography: Viswas Daniel; Sateesh Reddy Masam
- Edited by: Sree Varaprasad
- Music by: Sam C. S.
- Production companies: Srichakraas Entertainments
- Release date: 31 October 2024
- Country: India
- Language: Telugu
- Budget: ₹10 crore
- Box office: ₹53 crore

KA is a 2024 Indian Telugu-language fantasy thriller film directed by Sujith and Sandeep. The film features Kiran Abbavaram in a dual role alongside Nayan Sarika, and Tanvi Ram in lead roles.

KA was theatrically released on 31 October 2024 to positive reviews from critics and grossed over ₹53 crore worldwide. It was also the highest-grossing film in Abbavaram's career, at the time of its release, surpassing SR Kalyanamandapam.

== Plot ==
A masked man orders his men to capture two people, Abhinaya Vasudev and Radha. After a struggle, they bring an unconscious Vasudev to him. Vasudev wakes in a dark room holding a table and a strange clock etched with symbols. The masked man, whom everyone calls Pedda Sir, questions him about a letter addressed to a man named Abid Sheikh. When Vasudev denies knowing anything, Pedda Sir tells him the clock is a hypnotic device that will make him talk, and it draws Vasudev into his past.

In 1977, Vasudev grows up in an orphanage, where he develops a habit of reading other people's letters, partly to understand why his mother abandoned him. The caretaker, Gurunatham Master, hides money saved for his sick daughter's treatment on a shelf along with a letter. When Vasudev tries to read the letter, Gurunatham catches him, assumes he is stealing, beats him, and tells him such behavior is why his mother gave him up. Enraged, Vasudev steals the money and runs away, though he carries guilt over it. He takes up odd jobs, finishes his schooling privately, and, drawn to letters, travels to the village of Krishnagiri to work as a postman. The village lies between high mountains and falls into shadow by 3:00 pm.

Vasudev joins as a temporary postman under postmaster Ranga Rao and falls in love with his daughter, Satyabhama. He learns that girls have been disappearing from the village and takes it seriously only when Satyabhama is targeted. He saves her and begins investigating but hesitates to involve the police before revealing his own past. Impressed by his reasoning, Pedda Sir shows his face, and Vasudev is shocked to see that the former is his double.

In a parallel thread, after his daughter's death, Gurunatham adopts another girl, who is now pregnant and has returned to the village. In another room, Radha is being questioned through the same clock. She is a new government teacher in Krishnagiri and the sole earner for a family of wayward brothers she cannot reform. Vasudev hears her voice, and she tells him her story: she had a rowdy-sheeter arrested, and he later finds her alone and molests her. Her brothers plan to kill the man as he is taken into custody and set out the plan in letters that Vasudev reads. Vasudev saves the man and helps him escape custody, but when the man reveals why he was attacked, an enraged Vasudev kills him.

Continuing his account, Vasudev explains how he solved the disappearances. The rowdy-sheeter worked for Abid Sheikh, a respected village figure who, with a police head constable and a woman serving as the local doctor, abducts girls for trafficking, using the village's daily darkness as cover. When the group moves to seize the village's young women by force, Vasudev frees the captives and kills all three. Trying to protect Radha in the chaos, he is seized by Pedda Sir's men along with her.

Pedda Sir then reveals the twist: Vasudev and Radha were shot dead by the doctor, and the rooms are the womb of Gurunatham's adopted daughter. Pedda Sir is Vasudev's "KA", his soul or inner self, which decides his fate based on his good and bad deeds. Because Vasudev stole from Gurunatham as a child, destiny makes Gurunatham's daughter his mother in payment for that wrong; Radha, a woman he never met but died trying to protect, is reborn as his twin sister. The two are born again as twins to Gurunatham's daughter. A closing narration states that rebirth is itself a punishment, since they must answer for his past actions, and the film hints at a sequel.

== Cast ==
- Kiran Abbavaram in a dual role as
  - M. Abhinaya Vasudev 'Abhi' a postman
  - KA/Peddha Sir, later revealed to be his soul or inner self (Voice by Hemachandra)
- Nayan Sarika as Satyabhama
- Tanvi Ram as Radha
- Achyuth Kumar as Basarlapudi "Late" Ranga Rao, Satyabhama's father, Abhi's boss in post office.
- Redin Kingsley as Subbu, Ranga Rao's assistant and Vasudev's friend
- Kota Jayaram as Gurunadham Master
- Annapoorna as Gurunadham's mother
- Ajay as Gurunadham's son-in-law
- Sharanya Pradeep as Gurunadham's adopted daughter
- Bindu Chandramouli as Trafficking Boss
- Temper Vamsi as Radha’s brother
- Meka Ramakrishna as Police Officer

== Music ==
The soundtrack and background score of the film were composed by Sam C. S. The audio rights were acquired by Saregama.

All lyrics are written by Sanapati Bharadwaj Patrudu.

Track list
| No. | Title | Singer(s) | Length |
|---|---|---|---|
| 1. | "World of Vasudev" | Kapil Kapilan | 3:58 |
| 2. | "Ka Mass Jathara" | Diwakar, Sam C. S. | 2:52 |
| 3. | "Bujjamma" | Sarath Santhosh | 3:35 |

== Release ==
KA was theatrically released on 31 October 2024 coinciding with Deepawali. The theatrical rights of the film were sold at a cost of ₹10 crore. Dulquer Salmaan's Wayfarer Films acquired the dubbed Malayalam rights of KA. Due to multiple language film releases during the Deepawali weekend, release of KA's other language versions ultimately delayed and released later. The Malayalam, Hindi and Tamil versions released on 22 November 2024.

=== Home media ===
The film's Telugu version began streaming on ETV Win on 28 November 2024. The dubbed versions are available on Amazon Prime.

== Reception ==
Srivatsan Nadadhur of The Hindu wrote that "KA is not without its shortcomings, though they pale in comparison with the ambition in the writing and technical finesse. It is a thriller with a difference". Sashidhar Adivi of Times Now rated it three out of five and wrote that "KA is an interesting take on the thriller genre, blending suspense and philosophical ideas in an engaging way. Though it has a few shifts in tone and issues with writing, the story doesn’t deviate from its purpose of establishing how the ‘concept of life’ eventually catches up with you".

=== Box office ===
The film grossed more than ₹50 crore in its theatrical run, and was among the highest-grossing Telugu films of 2024.
