= Gam Gam Ganesha =

2024 Telugu film

- Theatrical release poster
- Directed by: Uday Bommisetty
- Written by: Uday Bommisetty
- Produced by: Vamsi Krishna Karumanchi; Kedar Selagamsetty
- Starring: Anand Deverakonda; Pragathi Srivasthava; Nayan Sarika
- Cinematography: Aditya Javvadi
- Edited by: Karthika Srinivas
- Music by: Chaitan Bharadwaj
- Release date: 31 May 2024
- Running time: 132 minutes
- Country: India
- Language: Telugu
- Box office: ₹6.05 crore

Gam Gam Ganesha is a 2024 Indian Telugu-language crime comedy film written and directed by Uday Bommisetty. It starred Anand Deverakonda, Pragathi Srivasthava, Nayan Sarika, Emmanuel Jabardast, Vennela Kishore and Satyam Rajesh.

== Plot ==
Ganesh is a small-time crook who commits petty thefts with his friend Shankar. He is in love with Shruthi, a local supermarket employee, and wishes to marry her. However, Shruthi ends her relationship with Ganesh, as she is set to marry the supermarket owner. Heartbroken, Ganesh decides to plan a big heist to earn enough money to impress Sruthi and win her back. He teams up with Arun to steal a diamond from Arun's father to pay off his gambling debt. Ganesh manages to steal the diamond, but things go wrong when he accidentally shoots Arun's father, leading to Arun chasing them. Ganesh and Shankar successfully escape when Arun gets into an accident. Arun and his two bodyguards are forced to work for the inhabitants of a local village after causing significant damage to their farm.

Meanwhile, Kishore Reddy is a ruthless politician who aspires to be the Chief Minister of Andhra Pradesh. To fund his campaign, he hires Rudra, a local criminal, to smuggle 10 crores to him from Mumbai. The money is hidden in a huge idol of Lord Ganesha, with the premise that the idol is being bought for a Ganesh Chaturthi celebration. Rudra and his crew engage in a gunfight with prison enemies but manage to buy the Ganesh idol and smuggle the money successfully.

Ganesh and Shankar, who are now being pursued by the police, hide the diamond in the Ganesh idol to prevent being caught. However, Kishore Reddy and Rudra discover that the money is not in the idol. During Rudra's gunfight, the shop owner's child had accidentally sold the idol to Rajuvaru, the leader of a local village, and sold them an identical one. The money, along with Ganesh's diamond, is within Rajuvaru's idol.

To get closer to the idol, Ganesh and Shankar pretend to be members of the media covering Rajuvaru's Chathurthi celebration, while Rudra and his crew pretend to be lighting assistants. Although both crews plan to steal their respective items, various hijinks prevent either of them from gaining access to the idol. During the celebration, Ganesh falls in love with Neelaveni, a local villager, and wins her love by saving cattle from a fire that Rudra had created as a diversion. In the midst of all this, Arun and his crew escape their forced servitude and head to the village to find Ganesh. Both Ganesh and Rudra vow to get access to the idol on the celebration's last day, each one unaware of the other's reason.

However, both Ganesh and Rudra find that the idol is now missing. It is revealed that Rajuvaru, along with a local priest, has taken the idol. Rajuvaru, in need of money, was told by the priest that buying the idol and protecting it would give him immense wealth. However, the priest had heard Kishore Reddy's conversation about the money being smuggled inside the idol and convinced Rajuvaru to buy the idol to get the money for himself.

Everyone catches up with Rajuvaru and the idol, including Kishore Reddy, who has decided to retrieve the money himself because he does not trust Rudra to retrieve it. Another gunfight occurs until one of the priest's associates unintentionally blows up the money with a grenade. The police intervene and arrest Kishore Reddy, Rajuvaru, and the priest. The rest escape, although Arun and his crew are once again forced to work for the villagers after encountering them.

In the midst of the chaos, Ganesh and Shankar manage to recover the diamond, which was unharmed during the explosion. They escape and sell the diamond. Now having successfully gained wealth, Ganesh returns to the village and starts a family with Neelaveni.

== Cast ==
- Anand Deverakonda as Ganesh
- Pragathi Srivastav as Neelaveni
- Nayan Sarika as Shruthi, Ganesh's ex-girlfriend
- Emmanuel Jabardast
- Vennela Kishore as Organ David
- Raj Arjun as Kishore Reddy
- Satyam Rajesh as Rajavaru
- Yavar as Arun Sutaria
- Jeevan Kumar as Police
- Rupa Lakshmi
- Rajnish Sharma as Harinder

== Music ==
The songs were composed by Chaitan Bharadwaj and the soundtrack was produced under the label Saregama.

Gam Gam Ganesha

Soundtrack album by Chaitan Bharadwaj
- Released: 2024
- Genre: Soundtrack
- Language: Telugu
- Label: SaReGaMa
- Producer: Prashanth R Vihari

Chaitan Bharadwaj chronology
Mama Mascheendra (2023)	Gam Gam Ganesha (2024)	Harom Hara (2024)

Track List
No.	Title	Lyrics	Music	Artist(s)	Length
1.	"Gam Gam Ganesha Motion Poster Music"		Chaitan Bharadwaj	Chaitan Bharadwaj	00:38
2.	"Brundavanive"	Vengi Sudhakar	Chaitan Bharadwaj	Chaitan Bharadwaj , Sid Sriram	03:38
3.	"Picchiga Nacchesave"	Suresh Banisetti	Chaitan Bharadwaj	Chaitan Bharadwaj , Anurag Kulkarni	03:33
4.	"GGG Rap"	Pranav Chaganty	Chaitan Bharadwaj	Chaitan Bharadwaj , Pranav Chaganty	02:33
5.	"Gam Gam Ganesha Motion Poster Music"	Kalyan Chakravarthy	Chaitan Bharadwaj	Chaitan Bharadwaj , Karunya	02:55

== Release and reception ==
The film released on 31 May 2024. It was later premiered on Amazon Prime Video on 20 June 2024. The Times of India gave the film two out of five stars. The Hindu criticized the lack of the plot and sub-plots.
