= Thimmarajupalli TV =

2026 Indian Telugu language film

- Poster
- Directed by: V. Muniraju
- Written by: V. Muniraju
- Produced by: Kiran Abbavaram; Teja Velpucharla
- Starring: Sai Tej; Veda Jallandar; Lathish Keelapattu
- Cinematography: Akshay Ram Podishetti
- Music by: Vamsikanth Rekkhana
- Production companies: KA Productions; Sumaira Studios
- Release date: 17 April 2026
- Running time: 124 minutes
- Country: India
- Language: Telugu

Thimmarajupalli TV is a 2026 Indian Telugu-language comedy film directed by V. Muniraju. The stars Sai Tej, Veda Jallandar, Lathish Keelapattu in the lead role.

== Cast ==
- Sai Tej
- Veda Jallandar
- Lathish Keelapattu
- Pradeep Kotte

== Reception ==
Sanjana Pulugurtha from The Times of India said that "A grounded rural drama that works better in the second half. It asks for time and patience, but rewards it with sincerity and a quietly engaging narrative." Sangeetha Devi Dundoo from The Hindu said that "A nostalgic Telugu drama with 50 newcomers. Debut director V. Muniraju’s Telugu film revisits simpler times to explore human relationships and evolving mindsets."
