= Akshara Gowda =

Indian actress

Akshara Gowda Bikki
- Born: Harini Gowda; Bangalore, Karnataka, India
- Citizenship: India
- Education: Sri Krishna Institute Of Technology (SKIT), Bangalore; Vijaya Bifurcated Pre University College
- Occupations: Actress, Model
- Years active: 2011–present
- Spouse: Aakash Bikki
- Parents: JPS Gowda; Gowri gowda

Akshara Gowda Bikki (born Harini Gowda) is an Indian actress who appears in Tamil, Hindi, Kannada & Telugu films.

== Personal life ==
In April 2011, Akshara Gowda was linked to Indian cricketer Yuvraj Singh. However, Gowda immediately denied it and said it was mere media imagination.

In a 2017 interview, Gowda spoke about her personal experience of overcoming depression.

== Career ==
Akshara made her debut in the Tamil film Uyarthiru 420 (2011). She played a role in the Hindi film Chitkabrey - The Shades of Grey the same year. She also made a special appearance in the Tamil film in Thuppakki (2012) directed by AR Murugadoss and starring Vijay. She made her Bollywood debut in Priyadarshan's Rangrezz in 2013. Gowda appeared in Ajith-Vishnuvardhan's Tamil film Arrambam (2013). She became popular by appearing in "Stylish Thamizhachi" song from the same film, which eventually became instant hit. She is also featured in films Irumbu Kuthirai (2014), Bogan (2017), Sangili Bungili Kadhava Thorae (2017), Maayavan (2017), Nene Naa (2023) and Harom Hara (2024).

== Filmography ==
Key
†	Denotes films that have not yet been released

Year	Title	Role	Language	Notes	Ref.
2011	Uyarthiru 420	Devatha	Tamil		
2011	Chitkabrey - The Shades of Grey	Palak Grewal	Hindi		
2012	Thuppakki	Shwetha	Tamil	Special appearance	
2013	Rangrezz	Jasmine	Hindi		
2013	Arrambam	Deeksha	Tamil		
2014	Irumbu Kuthirai	Herself	Tamil	Special appearance in song "Pondicherry"	
2017	Bogan	Akshara	Tamil		
2017	Sangili Bungili Kadhava Thorae	Herself	Tamil	Cameo appearance	
2017	Maayavan	Vishma	Tamil		
2018	Premadalli	Sapna	Kannada		
2019	Panchatantra	Artha	Kannada		
2019	Manmadhudu 2	Akshara	Telugu	Cameo appearance	
2022	Idiot	Neelagandi	Tamil		
2022	Trivikrama	Sakshi	Kannada		
2022	The Warriorr	Swarna	Telugu; Tamil	Bilingual film	
2023	Das Ka Dhamki	Deepthi	Telugu		
2023	Nene Naa	Mallika	Telugu		
2024	Harom Hara	ACP Kiranmayi	Telugu		
2026	Terror	Pragya	Kannada		

=== Streaming television ===
Year	Title	Role	Language	Notes	Ref.
2020	Masti's	Simran	Telugu	Aha series	
2024	Mix Up	Nikhita "Nikki"	Telugu	Aha series	
