= Arjuna Phalguna =

2021 Indian action film

- Theatrical release poster
- Directed by: Teja Marni
- Written by: Teja Marni
- Produced by: Niranjan Reddy; Anvesh Reddy
- Starring: Sree Vishnu; Amritha Aiyer
- Cinematography: Jagadeesh Cheekati
- Edited by: Viplav Nyshadam
- Music by: Priyadarshan Balasubramanian, Gaurav Pareek
- Production company: Matinee Entertainment
- Release date: 31 December 2021
- Running time: 125 minutes
- Country: India
- Language: Telugu

Arjuna Phalguna is a 2021 Indian Telugu-language crime comedy film written and directed by Teja Marni. It is produced by Matinee Entertainment, the film stars Sree Vishnu and Amritha Aiyer in the lead roles. It follows a group of friends from a rural village who become unintentionally involved in cannabis smuggling and subsequently confront systemic corruption. The film was released theatrically on 31 December 2021.

== Plot ==
In a small village in East Godavari, a pose of five friends, Arjun, Ram Babu, Thadodu, Oscar and Shravani are close knit and share everything.

Arjun a Jr NTR fan who prefers to stay in his native village and work for less money than going to big cities and earnings. He stays with his parents and helps his father run his dairy business.

One day, their Village bank tries to seize Thadodu's house, and on request of their Village President, who is also a private lender, the bank manager gives some more time. But the manager asks a bribe to manage the situation, and then Arjun was forced to give away his favorite cow as the guarantee to the president by lending money of Rs.50,000 to give a bribe.

Arjun, having good expertise in making a perfect soda, later decides to start his own soda business with his friends and applies for a loan, but the bank manager asks Rs.50,000 as his commission for getting them a personal loan.

Arjun and his friends get the offer from their childhood rival Vamsi now a rural Croupier to earn the required money to free the house as well as the money required for the bribe by transferring Cannabis. Though reluctant at first, they agree to the terms because of their dire needs.

The transfer does not go well and a corrupt but strict police officer, Subba Raju "Subbu" chases them. However, Arjun and his gang successfully escaped from his clutches with the unexpected help of Sravani. Finally, they reached Andhra-Orissa Border to transfer the cannabis but they learned that the bags had been swapped with Subbu in the chase, which found the money worth Rs.50 lakhs. Then the gang tries to steal the amount from them, and a fight ensues, and with a hard struggle, they escape to Vizag. There, they caught again the Cops who were Subbu's loyalists and the smugglers gang. But Arjun acts smart by fooling them as showing an opposite member to each other and escapes to their Village. After knowing the facts, Subbu teams up with the smugglers and becomes determined to nab Arjun and his friends.

After reaching their village, they hide the bag in a haystack and started to wait for their chance to give the money. Meanwhile, they learn that the Sarpanch's daughter Sunita is going to marry Subbu, deciding not to go in front of him. Later, the bank manager comes to seize Thadodu's house by saying the given time has end. When Arjun goes back to retrieve the money, he is shocked to see the haystack burnt with their money. With all hopes gone, the gang decide to do work in the city. When Arjun goes to see his favourite cow one last time, secretly their he sees the real face of Sarpanch. It is revealed that the Bank manager is the partner in crime of the Sarpanch who decided to grab the villagers lands by getting cheaply. By making them believe the villagers as a good man he lends the loan with a low interest rates to the villagers for paying the bank loans whenever they cannot pay the installment. At the same time he made a deal with manager that he will buy the seized lands cheaply from the bank who privately gives some commission to the manager to get hold off. The Sarpanch knows well that the poor farmers like Thadodu can't pay their loan back it is easy to grab such properties from them and started their scam.

After knowing the facts Arjun threatens the Sarpanch to expose him to the village; with no option left, the Sarpanch comes to bargain upon knowing that his son-in-law is very strict if the facts were known to him it will become a problem to his family prestige. Then Arjun bargains the lands who grabbed by him need to give back to villagers. The Sarpanch obeys to give back except Thadodu's home as he had given that property to Subbu as a dowry. Then Arjun confronts Subbu and threatens by showing his secret video who got along with the money in the chase and kept for himself to protect themselves. Subbu's intentions are revealed that he was organizing an Animal trade by joining hands with the forest welfare minister of the state. A journalist who recorded all of his activities demands ransom to him but he was caught and arrested in a cheating case by Subbu. Unfortunately the facts and money were swapped with the Cannabis bag. With no option left Subbu comes to Arjun knees to bargain on thinking of that his father-in-law is a sincere man. Then Arjun orders to give Thadodu's land as a gentle way. Later in a news headline Arjun learns that Subbu got a promotion for arresting Vamsi for the fake notes exchange. It is revealed that the amount was filled with fake notes when Arjun was hiding the bag. Vamsi, who saw it thefts the entire money and burns the haystack.

The film ends on a happy note with friends discussing the upcoming RRR.

== Cast ==
- Sree Vishnu as Arjuna
- Amritha Aiyer as Sravani
- Naresh as Village Sarpanch
- Sivaji Raja as Arjuna's father
- Subbaraju as DFO Subbaraju
- Devi Prasad as Thadodu's father
- Kalpa Latha as Thadodu's mother
- Rangasthalam Mahesh as Thadodu
- Dayanand Reddy
- Gaurav Pareek
- Chaitanya Garikipati as Oscar
- Rajkumar Kasireddy as Rambabu

== Soundtrack ==
The soundtrack album features eight songs.

All tracks are written by Chaitanya Prasad.

No.	Title	Singer(s)	Length
1.	"Godari Valle Sandhamama"	Amala Chebolu, Aravind Murali
2.	"Kaapadeva Raapadeva" (Additional vocals: Aravind Murali)	Mohana Bhogaraju
3.	"Oka Theeyani Maatatho"	Shashwat Singh, Shreya Iyer
4.	"Fast Fast Vadiley"	Asal Kolaar, Priyadarshan Balasubramanian
5.	"Raave Raave"	Deepak Blue, Amala Chebolu
6.	"Hara Hara Mahadev"	Shivam
7.	"Beat of Arjuna" (Instrumental)
8.	"Villan’s Chaos" (Instrumental)
Total length:			19:30

== Release ==
=== Theatrical ===
The film was released on 31 December 2021, New Year's Eve.

=== Home media ===
The film began streaming on Aha on 26 January 2022.

== Reception ==
Y. Sunitha Chowdhary of The Hindu appreciated Vishnu's performance but opined the film was let down by a weak story. "With no chemistry between the lead pair, hardly any emotional heft, a comedy that falls flat and cinematography that doesn't impress, the film is not engaging," Chowdhary added. Sakshi critic Anji Shetty who rated the film 2/5 stars also felt the same. Shetty criticized the film's poor direction and routine storyline. Siddartha Toleti of Mirchi9 rated the film 1.75 stars of 5 and criticised the Direction, Screenplay, Weak Story, Overdramatic and Logic less scenes Sequences but praised Some Emotional Moments. "Clueless Direction" Toleti added.

A reviewer from Eenadu compared the film with warrior Arjuna who was trapped in Padmavyuha owing to its weak screenplay and lackluster climax.
