= Korean Kanakaraju =

- Theatrical release poster
- Directed by: Merlapaka Gandhi
- Written by: Merlapaka Gandhi
- Produced by: Sai Babu Jagarlamudi; Y. Rajeev Reddy
- Starring: Varun Tej; Ritika Nayak; Satya
- Cinematography: Manojh Reddy Katasani
- Edited by: Satyaa G
- Music by: Thaman S
- Production companies: First Frame Entertainments; UV Creations
- Release date: 7 August 2026
- Running time: 150 minutes
- Country: India
- Language: Telugu
- Box office: ₹40 crore

Korean Kanakaraju is a 2026 Indian Telugu-language action horror comedy film written and directed by Merlapaka Gandhi. It was produced by Sai Babu Jagarlamudi and Y. Rajeev Reddy under First Frame Entertainments and UV Creations. The film stars Varun Tej in the titular role, alongside Ritika Nayak and Satya. Merlapaka Gandhi

The film was released theatrically worldwide on 7 August 2026.It received mixed to positive reviews from critics.

== Plot ==
Kanakaraju's life takes a bizarre supernatural turn at a local bar when a mysterious, ancient dragon-engraved vase or container holding the ashes/spirit of a deceased Korean man (or notorious Korean underworld figure) is accidentally disturbed. Through a freak chain of events involving alcohol and the mystical artifact, Kanakaraju becomes possessed by the eerie Korean spirit.

The possession grants Kanakaraju bizarre supernatural abilities—most notably, whenever someone utters the word "Korea," he gains glowing blue eyes and instantly teleports or gets pulled into high-stakes cross-cultural chaos. As the restless spirit's true intentions surface—needing to resolve unfinished business and see his family—the narrative evolves into a tug-of-war between Kanakaraju’s consciousness and the entity. This eventually pulls Kanakaraju, Chaitra, and Kishtappa into a wild collision of Rayalaseema machismo, local rural rivalries, and violent Korean mafia gang wars spanning from Andhra Pradesh to the streets of Seoul.

== Cast ==
- Varun Tej as Kanakaraju "Kanaka"
- Ritika Nayak as Chaitra, Kanakaraju's love interest
- Satya as Kishtappa, Kanakaraju's friend
- Srinivas Avasarala as Prithviraju, Kanakaraju's elder brother
- Muralidhar Goud as Kishtappa's father
- Chinna as Muniswamy, Prithviraju and Kanakaraju's father
- Tulasi as Prithviraju and Kanakaraju's mother
- Sunil as Chenga Reddy
- Temper Vamsi as Karri Sreenu, Chenga Reddy's nephew
- VTV Ganesh as Diwakar
- Bheemala Revanth Pavan Sai Subhash as Gaajubomma, Diwakar’s son
- Vishika as Prithviraju’s wife
- Sujatha Gosukonda as Chaitra’s mother
- Mahesh Achanta as Chenga Reddy’s PA
- Oh Yong Seok as Four Fingers
- Joo Young Ho as Bora, Four Fingers’ right-hand man
- Lee Nataliya as Four Fingers’ wife
- Daksha Nagarkar as Dancer Sunitha (Cameo appearance)

== Music ==
The film's soundtrack album and background score are composed by Thaman S. The first single from the album, titled "Kamsahamnida", was sung by Sid Sriram.

| No. | Title | Lyrics | Singer(s) | Length |
|---|---|---|---|---|
| 1. | "Rasaagummadi" | Kasarla Shyam | Nalgonda Gaddar Narsanna | 03:57 |
| 2. | "Kamsahamnida" | Kasarla Shyam | Sid Sriram | 03:13 |
| 3. | "Neowa Hummke Ya" | Sreejo | Sruthi Ranjani & D. Dheeraj | 03:49 |
| 4. | "Wrath Of Bhairava" | Adviteeya Vojjala | Thaman S. | 01:14 |
| 5. | "The Possession Theme" | Hari S.R. | Thaman S. | 09:03 |
| Total length: | | | | 20:58 |

== Release ==
Korean Kanakaraju was released in theaters worldwide on 7 August 2026.

Sri Venkateswara Creations is responsible for the distribution of this film in the Nizam and Vizag areas.
