= Uyarthiru 420 =

- Theatrical release poster
- Directed by: S. Premnath
- Screenplay by: S. Premnath
- Story by: S. Premnath
- Starring: Snehan; Vaseegaran; Meghana Raj; Akshara Gowda; Aishwarya Rajesh; Akshaya
- Cinematography: D. Shankar
- Music by: Mani Sharma
- Production company: Rich India Talkies
- Release date: 12 August 2011
- Country: India
- Language: Tamil

Uyarthiru 420 (transl. Respected 420) is a 2011 Tamil language action drama film written and directed by S. Premnath The film stars lyricist Snehan, Vaseegaran, and Meghana Raj in the lead roles, while Akshara Gowda, Aishwarya Rajesh, and Akshaya play supporting roles. It revolves around "an ordinary man who aspires to become rich by adopting wrong ways, like hugging women by taking advantage of them and fondling their hip folds under the pretext of seeing them as sisters". The music was composed by Mani Sharma. It was released on 12 August 2011.

== Plot ==
Thamizh (Snehan) is a clever conman who cheats and manipulates people for personal gain. He targets Iyal (Meghana Raj) early in the film but later joins Rishvanth’s (Vaseegaran) struggling hotel as General Manager, aiming to help revive its fortunes. While navigating the challenges of the business, Thamizh develops feelings for Iyal and uses his cunning skills to protect Rishvanth from the manipulations of a powerful journalist, Jagan (Jayaprakash). In the climax, Thamizh’s wit and actions help resolve the conflicts, balancing his rogue tendencies with a more ethical outcome.

== Cast ==
- Snehan as Thamizh
- Vaseegaran as Rishivanth
- Meghana Raj as Iyal
- Akshaya as Savithri
- Akshara Gowda as Devatha
- Aishwarya as Charu
- Jayaprakash as Janagan Pattabiraman
- Ramesh Khanna as Uthaman
- Raj Kapoor as Police
- R. Chandrasekar as Chandrasekar
- Bosskey
- Deepak Dinkar as Thamizh's friend
- Mime Gopi as Rowdy
- Chaams
- Arjunan as Doctor
- Harish
- KK
- Malaysia Balu
- Chitti Babu (special appearance in "Natchathira Hotel")

== Production ==
Meghana Raj, who previously played a softspoken person in Kaadhal Solla Vandhen (2008), played a glamorous role in the film. The film was shot in Bangalore.

== Soundtrack ==
The music was composed by Mani Sharma. The audio launch event took place on 22 June 2011 at Sathyam Cinemas, Chennai.

No.	Song	Singers	Lyrics
1	"Azhagiya Ravana"	Rita, Haricharan	Arivumathi
2	"Natchathira Hotel"	Mukesh	Kirithiya
3	"Roru Roru"	Ranjith	Vaali
4	"Theme Song"	Rahul Nambiar	Sundar Phadke
5	"Uyire Un Mounam" I	Karthik, Shweta Mohan	Snehan
6	"Uyire Un Mounam" II	Shweta Mohan	Snehan

== Reception ==
A critic from The New Indian Express wrote, "‘Uyarthiru…’ is an intriguing rogue. Incomprehensible at times, unconvincing at others, but a tolerable, fairly lovable rogue".
