= Dilruba (film) =

2025 Indian Telugu-language film by Viswa Karun

- Theatrical release poster
- Directed by: Viswa Karun
- Written by: Viswa Karun
- Produced by: Vikram Mehra; Siddharth Anand Kumar; Ravi; Jojo Jose; Rakesh Reddy
- Starring: Kiran Abbavaram; Rukshar Dhillon; Kathy Davison
- Cinematography: Viswas Daniel
- Edited by: Praveen K. L.
- Music by: Sam C. S.
- Production companies: Sivam Celluloids; Yoodlee Films
- Release date: 14 March 2025
- Running time: 152 minutes
- Country: India
- Language: Telugu

Dilruba is a 2025 Indian Telugu-language romantic action drama film written and directed by Viswa Karun and produced by Vikram Mehra, Siddharth Anand Kumar, Ravi, Jojo Jose and Rakesh Reddy. The film features Kiran Abbavaram, Rukshar Dhillon, Kathy Davison in important roles.

The film was released on 14 March 2025.

== Plot ==
Sidhu, after a painful breakup. Stops saying "Sorry" and "Thank you" , he shifts to Mangalore, to pursue engineering. Where he meets Anjali, falls in love. But due to some consequences, he refuses to apologize to college authorities, causing breakup between Anjali and Sidhu.

Meanwhile, Sidhu's ex-girlfriend Maggie returns to India, and a dangerous criminal starts targeting him, how sidhu faced challenges with both internal and external struggles is the story.

== Cast ==
- Kiran Abbavaram as Siddhu
- Rukshar Dhillon as Anjali
- Kathy Davison as Meghana "Maggie"
- Satya
- Vasu Inturi
- Anand
- Tulasi
- Aadukalam Naren
- John Vijay

== Music ==
All music is composed by Sam C. S..

No.	Title	Lyrics	Singer(s)	Length
1.	"Aggipulle"	Bhaskarabhatla	Anurag Kulkarni	3:25
2.	"Hey Jingili"	Bhaskarabhatla	Sam CS	4:04
3.	"Kanna Nee"	Viswa Karun, Bhaskarabhatla	Sathyaprakash Dharmar, Maalavika Sundar	4:20
4.	"KCPD"	Viswa Karun	Abhishek AR	2:20

== Release and reception ==
Dilruba was scheduled to release on 14 February 2025, but was later released on 14 March 2025.

The Hindu stated that "Dilruba is a forgettable action-romance undone by its chaotic screenplay and insensitive treatment of a reasonably good idea". Sashidhar Adivi of Times Now rated the film 2 out of 5 and stated that the film "feels stuck in the 90s" and has a "tried and tested formula that has been showcased in many films to date".
