= Manmadhudu 2 =

2019 film by Rahul Ravindran

- Theatrical release poster
- Directed by: Rahul Ravindran
- Screenplay by: Rahul Ravindran; Satyanand
- Based on: I Do (2006) by Alain Chabat
- Produced by: Nagarjuna; P. Kiran
- Starring: Nagarjuna; Rakul Preet Singh
- Cinematography: M. Sukumar
- Edited by: Chota K. Prasad; Bonthala Nageswara Reddy
- Music by: Chaitan Bharadwaj
- Production companies: Viacom18 Studios; Annapurna Studios; Anandi Art Creations
- Distributed by: Viacom18 Studios
- Release date: 9 August 2019
- Running time: 152 minutes
- Country: India
- Language: Telugu
- Budget: ₹30 crore

Manmadhudu 2 (transl. Cupid 2) is a 2019 Indian Telugu-language romantic comedy film directed by Rahul Ravindran. It is produced by Nagarjuna and P. Kiran under Annapurna Studios, Anandi Art Creations and Viacom18 Studios. It stars Nagarjuna and Rakul Preet Singh, with music composed by Chaitan Bharadwaj. The film is an official remake of the French film I Do (2006) and is a spiritual successor to Nagarjuna's Manmadhudu (2002). The film opened up to mixed to negative reviews and became a box-office bomb.

== Cast ==
- Nagarjuna as Samba Siva Rao a.k. a. Sam
- Rakul Preet Singh as Avantika (Voice dubbed by Chinmayi)
- Rao Ramesh as Attharu Pushparaju, Sam's maternal uncle
- Vennela Kishore as Kishore, Sam's PA
- Lakshmi as Sam's mother
- Rohini as Janani, NGO director
- Jhansi as Swarnalatha, Sam's elder sister
- Devadarshini as Sangeetha, Sam's elder sister
- Nishanthi Evani as Swetha, Sam's younger sister
- Sri Satya as Avantika's sister

=== Cameo appearances ===
- Samantha Ruth Prabhu as the girl who Sam meets at a bridge (Voice dubbed by Chinmayi)
- Keerthy Suresh as Suma, Sam's ex-girlfriend
- Akshara Gowda as Akshara, the girl whom Sam meets at the bar
- Brahmanandam as Suribabu Lavangam
- Sudhanshu Pandey as Amit, Avantika's sadistic ex-boyfriend

== Production ==
The film is being produced by Annapurna Studios, Anandi Art Creations and Viacom18 Motion Pictures. Movie launched on March 25, 2019, with a formal puja ceremony in Annapurna Studios, Hyderabad. Naga Chaitanya, Amala Akkineni, Sumanth and Sushanth has graced the event. After filming some important scenes in some locations at Portugal (including Lisbon) and Switzerland, the team wrapped up the schedule and returned to Hyderabad.

== Soundtrack ==
Manmadhudu 2

Soundtrack album by Chaitan Bharadwaj
- Released: 4 August 2019
- Recorded: 2019
- Length: 10:37
- Label: Aditya Music
- Producer: Chaitan Bharadwaj

Chaitan Bharadwaj chronology
Guna 369 (2019)	Manmadhudu 2 (2019)	SR Kalyanamandapam (2021)
External audio
- Official Audio Jukebox on YouTube

Music composed by Chaitan Bharadwaj, and released on Aditya Music label.

No.	Title	Lyrics	Singer(s)	Length
1.	"Hey Menina"	Subham Viswanadh	Chaitan Bharadwaj	3:01
2.	"Naa Lona"	Subham Viswanadh	Chinmayi	4:02
3.	"Maa Chakkani Pellanta"	Kittu Vissapragada	Anurag Kulkarni, Chinmayi, Deepthi Parthasarathy	3:32
Total length:				10:37

== Release ==
The movie was released on 9 August 2019.

== Reception ==
=== Critical reception ===
The Times of India gave 3.5 out of 5 stars stating "The director missed a trick or two with the climax but gets almost everything else bang on, ensuring a hilarious entertainer that you wouldn't mind watching on repeat. Too much of something can be an overkill, they often say. But when it comes to Vennela Kishore's comedy in Manmadhudu 2, that doesn't ring true. In fact, it only leaves you wanting for more". India Today gave 2.5 out of 5 stars stating "Manmadhudu 2, directed by Rahul Ravindran, aims to be a breezy entertainer but it barely scratches the surface. Witty one-liners and a handful of neatly crafted moments are the only takeaways from Manmadhudu 2". Firstpost gave 2.5 out of 5 stars stating "This could have been a meaningful drama about toxic relationships, but Rahul Ravindran does not quite dig deep into that aspect of the film. This could also have been a film about a man who is afraid of breakups because that seems more unbearable than being lonely, but we do not see enough of that. This could have been about a family trying to make Sam understand the meaning of happiness and companionship, but all we get to see is a bunch of them trying all sorts of things to convince Sam, except for pouring their hearts out to him directly. Manmadhudu 2 could have been so much more than what it is but it ends up nowhere".

The Indian Express gave 3 out of 5 stars stating "Rahul Ravindran has not set this story in a perfect world. The hero’s family is regressive in its thinking even as all of them seem lovely. The hero is a womanizer. Sam also seems to enjoy trips to strip clubs and so on. And yet, the film is not crass. It is an imperfect world and we should accept something good even if we find it in the most unlikely places". The New Indian Express gave 2.5 out of 5 stars stating "Save for a few comic sequences provided by Vennela Kishore, Manmadhudu 2 is a bumpy ride that struggles to take off at the right time. The convoluted plot devoid of the emotional arc makes it a dreary affair". The News Minute stated "The film has its moments but holds itself back too much and Nagarjuna's character, especially, needs more work".

Sangeetha Devi Dundoo of The Hindu wrote "Manmadhudu 2 doesn’t live up to that promise and here’s hoping that with the next one, Rahul will be back in form". Hindustan Times gave 1.5 out of 5 stars stating "Despite decent performances by the film’s lead cast, Nagarjuna and Rakul Preet Singh, the film’s writing is a huge let down. Except for a couple of funny one-liners, the film is a disgrace and shouldn’t belong to the world of Manmadhudu". Deccan Chronicle stating "Manmadhudu 2 is a big blunder from Nagarjuna, who bought the remake rights of the French film. He spoke very highly about this film but it does not come to pass. The film’s leading lights stressed many times that the film is for a family audience, it is anything but that".
