= Mistake (2023 film) =

2023 Telugu film

- Directed by: Bharrath Komalapati
- Written by: Bharrath Komalapati
- Produced by: Abhinav Sardhar
- Starring: Abhinav Sardhar; Ajay Kumar Kathurvar; Sujith Kumar; Teja Ainampudi; Karishma Kumar
- Cinematography: Jasthi Hari
- Edited by: Vijay Mukthavarapu
- Music by: Mani Zenna
- Production company: ASP Media House
- Release date: 4 August 2023
- Country: India
- Language: Telugu

Mistake is a 2023 Indian Telugu-language thriller film directed by Bharrath Komalapati and produced by Abhinav Sardhar, who co-stars alongside Ajay Kumar Kathurvar, Sujith Kumar, Teja Ainampudi, and Karishma Kumar.

== Cast ==
- Abhinav Sardhar
- Ajay Kathurvar as Agasthya
- Sujith Kumar as Mahadev Sharma "Dev"
- Teja Ainampudi as Karthik
- Karishma Kumar
- Taniya Kalrra as Sweety
- Priya Paul as Mitra
- Nayan Sarika as Parvathy
- Raja Ravindra as Mitra's father
- Sameer

== Soundtrack ==
The music was composed by Mani Zenna and features the song "Taquero Mucho" sung by L. V. Revanth.

== Reception ==
Saketh of 10TV gave a positive review. Critics from Sakshi, NTV and Asianet News rated the film 2.5 out of 5.
