= Sangili Bungili Kadhava Thorae =

- Poster
- Directed by: Ike
- Written by: Ike
- Produced by: Atlee
- Starring: Jiiva; Sri Divya; Soori
- Cinematography: Sathyan Sooryan
- Edited by: T. S. Suresh
- Music by: Vishal Chandrasekhar
- Production companies: A for Apple Production; Fox Star Studios
- Distributed by: Fox Star Studios
- Release date: 19 May 2017
- Running time: 141 minutes
- Country: India
- Language: Tamil

Sangili Bungili Kadhava Thorae (transl. Sangili Bungili, open the door) is a 2017 Indian Tamil-language horror comedy film written and directed by Ike, and produced by Fox Star Studios and Atlee under his production house 'A for Apple Productions'. The film stars Jiiva, Sri Divya, and Soori while Radha Ravi, Radhika Sarathkumar, and Thambi Ramaiah play supporting roles. Featuring music composed by Vishal Chandrasekhar. The film began production in March 2016 and was released on 19 May 2017.

== Plot ==
Vasu is a house broker who sells houses by using tricks with his friend Sooranam. Vasu and his mother Parvathy live in her brother's house for rent. Vasu and his parents lived in rented houses throughout their lives. After Vasu's father's death, he vowed to buy a bungalow on the outskirts.

After some years, Vasu buys the bungalow and enters the house with his whole family. He later finds out that a family had lived there earlier. Jambulingam lived there with his wife, mother, and daughters. He refuses to move out, so Vasu decides to live there until he finds the owner who cheated him. Vasu and Jambulingam's daughter Shwetha fall in love with each other. Vasu and Sooranam try some ghost tricks to chase Jambulingam's family out of the house.

On learning about Vasu and Shwetha, Vasu's aunt is angered because she believed that her daughter Sandhya and Vasu would marry. She goes on a tirade about Vasu's actions to Parvathy. Parvathy tells Vasu to apologize to his aunt. He refuses, and his family moves out of the house. While Vasu and Sooranam threaten Jambulingam's deaf and dumb mother with a ghost, she sees a real ghost and is admitted to the hospital. Jambulingam blames Vasu for threatening his mother with ghosts and shows a video taken on the phone unknowingly. Shwetha also fights with Vasu, and the family moves out of the house.

Vasu brings E. B. Rajeshwari to learn about the ghost. Sangili Aandavar lived in the house and was killed by his family members for the house. She says that if the two families live happily in the house, Aandavar will leave. They happily live in the house, but Jambulingam does not like to stay there. He brings his family out and locks Vasu's family inside, but when he turns, he realises he is inside the house and everyone else is outside. Aandavar takes Jambulingam, but the whole family tries to rescue Jambulingam by showing strength and unity. Seeing this, Aandavar leaves the house, and Vasu lives there with his mother, Shwetha, and the family.

== Cast ==
- Jiiva as Vasu
- Sri Divya as Shwetha
- Radha Ravi as Sangili Aandavar
- Soori as Soornam
- Radhika Sarathkumar as Parvathy
- Thambi Ramaiah as Jambulingam
- Madhumila as Sandhya
- Ilavarasu as Parvathy's brother
- Kovai Sarala as E. B. Rajeshwari
- Devadarshini as Swetha's mother
- Senthi Kumari as Vasu's aunt
- Motta Rajendran as Chairman
- Kausalya as Aandavar's sister
- Saravana Subbiah as Andavar's brother-in-law
- R. Amarendran as Singapore Singaram
- Mayilsamy as Tea Shop Owner
- R. S. Shivaji as Nandakumar
- Uday Mahesh as Vasu's father
- Shanthi Mani as Jambulingam's mother
- Tamilselvi as Aandavar's sister-in-law
- Vaishali Thaniga as Shwetha's friend
- Suhashini as Mrs. David
- Nivas Adithan as Sangili's son
- Jai in a cameo appearance
- Premgi Amaren as Prem (voice-only)
- Daniel Annie Pope as a driver in a cameo appearance
- Akshara Gowda in a cameo appearance

== Production ==
In December 2015, Jiiva announced that he would work on a new film to be directed by newcomer Ike, an erstwhile assistant of Kamal Haasan. Raja Rani Productions Atlee would work on the film as the producer alongside Fox Star Studios, while Sridivya would play the lead female role. Jiiva revealed that he shared a good comfort level with both Ike and Atlee, who he had worked with during the making of Nanban (2012). He further stated that the film would be reminiscent of the horror comedy films earlier made by director Priyadarshan.

The film began production during March 2016 with the first schedule held in Pazhani. The title of the film, Sangili Bungili Kadhava Thorae (name of a song from Kanchana) was also unveiled during the first schedule. Actors Jai and Akshara Gowda appeared in cameo roles as a NRI couple in the film, and shot for the film during the first week of the shoot.

== Soundtrack ==
The soundtrack was composed by Vishal Chandrasekhar, while the film's audio rights are secured by Sony Music.

No.	Title	Singers	Length
1.	"Ek Gau Mein"	Silambarasan, M. M. Manasi	4:19
2.	"Kattaduraikku"	Gangai Amaran	3:51
3.	"Hai, En Kai Mela"	Anirudh Ravichander, Shakthisree Gopalan	3:40
4.	"Govinda Govinda"	G. V. Prakash Kumar	3:38
5.	"Sangili Bungili Kadhava Thorae"	Arunraja Kamaraj, Premgi Amaren	2:50
Total length:			18:18

== Reception ==
M Suganth from The Times of India rated the film three out of five stars and wrote that "It is predictable fare, yes, and there isn’t much inventiveness both in terms of narrative and filmmaking, but there is a quiet confidence in how Ike narrates this tale and keeps us entertained". Srinivasa Ramanujam from The Hindu wrote that "There are more laughs than horror in SBKT. Director Ike seems to have taken a lot of effort in making this a ‘family story’, rather than concentrate on the ghost angle". Sowmya Rajendran from The News Minute wrote that "With its unoriginal humour and barely there fear factor, Sangili Bungili Kadhava Thorae is far from being a full bodied horror comedy. It's a ghost of the genre and a very pale one at that".
