= Ritika Nayak =

Indian actress

- Born: 27 October 2000 (age 25); Delhi, India
- Education: Shyama Prasad Mukherji College for Women
- Occupation: Actress
- Years active: 2022–present

Ritika Nayak is an Indian actress who works in Telugu films. She debuted with Ashoka Vanamlo Arjuna Kalyanam (2022), which was her breakthrough film and had her highest-grossing release with Mirai (2025).

== Early life and career ==
Ritika Nayak was born on 26 October 2000 in Delhi, India into an Odia family. She completed her schooling from Delhi Police Public School, Safdurjung Enclave and Graduated from Shyama Prasad Mukherji College for Women in University of Delhi. She has won the 12th season of Delhi Times' Fresh Face in 2019. From being a contestant and winner of the Delhi Times Fresh Face in Season 12, she was invited as a Celebrity Judge in the Delhi Times Fresh Face Season 15. After participating in various auditions across cities, she was cast in Ashoka Vanamlo Arjuna Kalyanam (2022), her debut film. She played the role of Pasupuleti Vasudha, which was her breakthrough and was nominated for SIIMA Award for Best Female Debut – Telugu.

== Filmography ==
Key
†	Denotes films that have not yet been released

Year	Title	Role	Language	Notes
2022	Ashoka Vanamlo Arjuna Kalyanam	Pasupuleti Vasudha	Telugu	Nominated–SIIMA Award for Best Female Debut – Telugu
2023	Hi Nanna	Adult Mahi	Telugu	Cameo appearance
2025	Mirai	Vibha	Telugu	
2026	Korean Kanakaraju	Chaitra	Telugu	
TBA	Duet †	TBA	Telugu; Tamil	Bilingual film; Filming
