= Aakatayi =

2017 Indian film directed by Rom Bhimana

- Theatrical release poster
- Directed by: Rom Bhimana
- Produced by: K R Vijay Karan; K R Kaushal Karan; K R Anil Karan
- Starring: Aashish Raj; Rukshar Dhillon
- Cinematography: Venkat Gangadhari
- Edited by: M. R. Varma
- Music by: Mani Sharma
- Production company: VKA Films
- Release date: 10 March 2017
- Running time: 146 minutes
- Country: India
- Language: Telugu

Aakatayi is a 2017 Indian Telugu-language action film directed by Rom Bhimana. Produced by K R Vijay Karan, K R Kaushal Karan, K R Anil Karan under the VKA Films, it features debutantes Aashish Raj and Rukshar Mir in the lead roles. Bollywood actress Ameesha Patel featured in an item title song. Mani Sharma composed the film's score and soundtrack. Pradeep Rawat, Suman, Ramki, Brahmanandam, Posani Krishna Murali played supporting roles.

== Plot ==
Vikranth (Ashish Raj) is a studious engineering student who falls for Anagha (Rukshar Mir) Vikranth gets a shocker of his life when he gets to know some news about his parents through Anagha. Vikranth steps in to know the truth about his parents. Then there is the World's most wanted criminal Jehangir (Pradeep Rawat) who comes into Vikranth's life and makes it difficult for him by spoiling his things.

== Cast ==
- Aashish Raj as Vikranth
- Rukshar Dhillon as Anagha
- Pradeep Rawat as Jehangir
- Suman as Chandrashekhar
- Brahmanandam as Kabali
- Ramki as Vikram Simha
- Raasi as Maalathi Devi
- Posani Krishna Murali as Politician
- Ajay Ghosh as Beeku
- Nagendra Babu as Police officer
- Prudhviraj as a Pawan Kalyan fan
- Srinivasa Reddy
- Ameesha Patel as an item number in title song

== Soundtrack ==
The music was composed by Mani Sharma and was released by Aditya Music.

Aakatayi

Soundtrack album by Mani Sharma
- Released: 8 February 2017
- Recorded: 2017
- Genre: Soundtrack
- Length: 28:22
- Label: Aditya Music
- Producer: Mani Sharma

Mani Sharma chronology
Siddhartha (2016)	Aakatayi (2017)	Fashion Designer s/o Ladies Tailor (2017)

Track list
No.	Title	Lyrics	Singer(s)	Length
1.	"Go Lets Go"	Karunakar Adigarla	Deepu, Sweekar Agasthi, Karuna	3:41
2.	"Niluvetthuga Nene Neevuga"	Chaitanya Prasad	Ramya Behara	4:43
3.	"Anaghaa Anaghaa (Version 1)"	Ramajogayya Sastry	Sri Krishna	4:11
4.	"Pranam Paravana"	Karunakar Adigarla	Anurag Kulkarni, Sahithi Chaganti	4:34
5.	"Virigina Aakasanni"	Sri Mani	Sweekar Agasti	2:49
6.	"Aakatayi (Ammammo Ela)"	Chaitanya Prasad	Uma Neha	4:13
7.	"Anaghaa Anaghaa (Version 2)"	Ramajogayya Sastry	Ramajogayya Sastry	4:11
Total length:				28:22

== Critical reception ==
A critic from The Times of India wrote that "Aakatayi is a one-time watch if you don’t use your brains for the second half of the film".
