= Rajkumar Kasireddy =

Indian actor

- Born: 12 January 1992 (age 34) bhadravaramJ. Annavaram, Andhra Pradesh, India
- Education: BSc
- Occupation: Actor
- Years active: 2019–present

Rajkumar Kasireddy (born 12 January 1992) is an Indian actor and comedian who appears in Telugu films. He made his debut with Raja Vaaru Rani Gaaru (2019). His notable films include Ashoka Vanamlo Arjuna Kalyanam (2022), Bedurulanka 2012 (2023), Aay (2024), and Lucky Baskhar (2024).

== Early life and career ==
Rajkumar Kasireddy was born in J. Annavaram, East Godavari district (now in Kakinada district), Andhra Pradesh, India. Since his childhood, he developed an interest towards music watching his grandfather playing harmonium. He aspired to be a music composer and has pursued a diploma in music from Andhra University alongside having a BSc degree.

After auditioning in Hyderabad, he made his acting debut in his friend Ravi Kiran Kola's directorial Raja Vaaru Rani Gaaru (2019). He has since appeared in various comic roles. His comedic performance in the romantic comedy Aay (2024) received critical praise.

== Filmography ==
Year	Title	Role	Notes
2019	Raja Vaaru Rani Gaaru	Chowdary	
2021	Arjuna Phalguna	Rambabu	
2022	Stand Up Rahul	Rahul's friend	
2022	Bloody Mary	Raju	
2022	Ashoka Vanamlo Arjuna Kalyanam	Photographer	Nominated–SIIMA Award for Best Comedian
2022	Chittam Maharani		
2022	Sita Ramam	Passerby	Cameo appearance
2022	Ranga Ranga Vaibhavanga	Rishi’s friend	
2023	Rangabali	Raju	
2023	Bedurulanka 2012	Kasiraju	
2024	Aay	Subbu	
2024	Lucky Baskhar	Samba	
2025	Kingdom	Singha	
2025	Gurram Paapi Reddy	Military	
2026	Nawab Cafe		
2026	Mension House Mallesh	Veerababu	
2026	Godari Gattupaina	Robert Rutherford	
2026	Irumudi	Bajji Shop Vendor	
2026	Aakasamlo Oka Tara	Vasu	
2026	Don Bosko	Vicky	Post-Production

=== Television ===
Year	Title	Role	Network
2022	Aha Naa Pellanta	Donga Gopal	ZEE5
2024	Paruvu	Chakravarthi	ZEE5
