= Meter (film) =

2023 Indian film by Ramesh Kaduri

- Theatrical release poster
- Directed by: Ramesh Kaduri
- Written by: Ramesh Kadiri; Suriya
- Produced by: Chiranjeevi Pedamallu; Hemalatha Pedamallu
- Starring: Kiran Abbavaram; Athulya Ravi; Pawan
- Cinematography: Venkat Dilip Chunduru; Suresh Sarangam Mahesh Gorla
- Edited by: Karthika Srinivas
- Music by: Sai Karthik
- Production company: Clap Entertainment
- Distributed by: Mythri Movie Makers
- Release date: 7 April 2023
- Running time: 127 minutes
- Country: India
- Language: Telugu

Meter is a 2023 Indian Telugu-language action comedy drama film written and directed by Ramesh Kaduri and produced by Clap Entertainment. Meter features Kiran Abbavaram and Athulya Ravi (in her Telugu debut) in lead roles. It was released on 7 April 2023 to highly negative reviews from the critics and audience, and was a box-office bomb, becoming a huge all-time career-wide disaster for Kiran Abbavaram.

== Plot ==
In 2006, during the police selections in Rajahmundry, Venkat Ratnam, the father of Arjun Kalyan who was a police officer at the time, noticed a candidate trying to join the selected candidates' list under MLA Kantham Byreddy's recommendation. Venkat Ratnam refused to accept the candidate due to his suspicions, despite pressure from Byreddy. As a result, he was transferred to Warangal, where he tried to intervene when Byreddy's convoy was obstructing a pregnant woman waiting in an autorickshaw. However, Byreddy slapped Venkat Ratnam for his interference. Arjun Kalyan, who witnessed the incident, grew to resent the police job. Nonetheless, his father dreamt of making him a sincere and honest police officer, unlike himself who was forced to do his job in fear.

Fast forward to 2023, Arjun Kalyan participated in Telangana Police Selections due to his father's insistence, but he failed the selections because he did not want to become a police officer. One day, while accompanying his father and uncle, he stumbled upon a kidnapping in progress and saved the heroine. Although he wasted time, he still managed to make it to the selection tests and passed them all. His father informed him that he was selected as an S.I officer for the Punjagutta Police Station.

On his first day at the police station, Arjun Kalyan released the arrested drug dealers. As a result, Commissioner Krishna Murari intended to dismiss Arjun Kalyan, but it turned out that the released dealers led the police to their gang, and they were all arrested. Arjun Kalyan became a hero in the city and difficult to terminate from his job. Later, Arjun Kalyan met the father of the woman he had saved from kidnapping, who informed him that she was averse to men and wished to become a nun.

The commissioner then met Arjun Kalyan, who had been absent from the station for a week, and told him that the city had been saved from a bomb disaster due to his undercover operation. Arjun Kalyan had been trailing sleeper cells of bombers while he was out following the heroine in a song sequence, which made the bombers withdraw their plan and retreat. This made him even more famous than before. Home Minister Kantham Byreddy then contacted Arjun Kalyan to negotiate with him. Arjun Kalyan offered to assist Byreddy with an IT raid, which was planned by Arjun Kalyan to help him lose his job.

Byreddy then tasked Arjun Kalyan with killing a man who had escaped from his custody, claiming he was a criminal. Byreddy ordered an encounter and Kalyan accepted, resulting in the man's death. During the incident, Kalyan's father jumped in to save the man from Kalyan's bullets, but despite his efforts, the man was killed by a truck.

Arjun Kalyan's father slipped into a coma due to the emotional trauma he experienced during the firing incident. Byreddy informs Arjun Kalyan that he was never officially appointed as a police officer due to a clerical error, and that another person was given the position meant for Arjun. Arjun Kalyan becomes determined to seek revenge on Byreddy and become a true police officer. He asks Byreddy for a police job, but is ignored. Arjun Kalyan warns the DGP, who works for the Home Minister, that if the news of the false appointment letter were to be leaked, it would harm the reputation of the police department. He then learns from his father that the man who escaped from Byreddy's custody was one of the 3000 people who were selected in the police selections, but his name was not included in the final list.

Arjun Kalyan kidnaps the DGP and demands his cooperation, but the DGP is killed by Byreddy. Arjun Kalyan obtains the lists of fake police officers appointed by Byreddy using the Right to Information Act (RTI), and compares the list of applicants with the final list of selected candidates to identify the fake police officers. He then heads to the governor's office to hand over the evidence, but his father is kidnapped by Byreddy. Arjun Kalyan strikes a deal with Byreddy, promising to show him a dummy app that can divert votes to Byreddy's party, in exchange for sending appointment letters to the original 3000 candidates. Byreddy falls for the trick and agrees to send the appointment letters. Arjun Kalyan's father is then retired with great honors.

Byreddy later realizes that the app was a dummy and is eventually arrested by the police for his various fraudulent activities.

== Cast ==
- Kiran Abbavaram as Arjun Kalyan
  - Master Roshan as young Arjun
- Athulya Ravi as Arjun’s love-interest
- Dhanush Pawan as Home Minister Kantham Byreddy
- Saptagiri as Arjun’s uncle
- Posani Krishna Murali as Commissioner P. Krishna Murari
- Vinay Varma as DGP Dileep Raavath
- Surya as Bharani
- Prudhvi Raj as Arjun’s girlfriend’s father (before surgery)
- Gautham Raju as Arjun’s girlfriend’s father (after surgery)
- Thagubothu Ramesh as Drunkard
- Vamsi Nekkanti as SI Venkat Rathnam, Arjun’s father
- Kalpa Latha as Arjun’s mother
- Sammeta Gandhi as Arjun’s grandfather
- Devi Prasad as DGP Thakur Sharma
- Keshav Deepak as Doctor
- Rohini as Nun

== Soundtrack ==
Meter

Soundtrack album by Sai Karthik
- Released: 2023
- Recorded: 2022–2023
- Genre: Feature film soundtrack
- Language: Telugu
- Label: Sony Music India

Sai Karthik chronology
Suvarna Sundari (2023)	Meter (2023)

Singles from Meter
- 1. "Chammak Chammak Pori" Released: 15 March 2023; 2. "Oh Baby Jaaripomaake" Released: 21 March 2023; 3. "Meter Title Song" Released: 4 April 2023

The film's score and soundtrack were composed by Sai Karthik. The music rights of the film were acquired by Sony Music India. The third single (title song) was released on 4 April 2023.

All lyrics are written by Balaji; all music is composed by Sai Karthik.

Track listing
No.	Title	Singer(s)	Length
1.	"Chammak Chammak Pori"	Arun Kaundinya, M. L. Gayatri	3:19
2.	"Oh Baby Jaaripomaake"	Dhanunjay	3:16
3.	"Meter Title Song"	Sai Karthik	3:02

== Release ==
Meter was released on 7 April 2023. The film's satellite and digital streaming rights were acquired by Gemini TV and Netflix respectively.

Hindi version of the film were acquired by Disney+ Hotstar and film is streaming on Netflix & Disney+ Hotstar.

== Reception ==
The film received negative reviews. Abhilasha Cherukuri of Cinema Express gave a rating of 1.5 out of 5 and opined that the film has heavily derivative story and a truckload of unintentional humour. The Times of India rated the film 2 out of 5 and stated that "writing needs more imagination and coherence".
