= Maha Samudram =

2021 film directed by Ajay Bhupathi

- Theatrical release poster
- Directed by: Ajay Bhupathi
- Written by: Ajay Bhupathi
- Produced by: Ramabrahmam Sunkara
- Starring: Sharwanand; Siddharth; Aditi Rao Hydari; Anu Emmanuel
- Cinematography: Raj Thota
- Edited by: Praveen K. L.
- Music by: Chaitan Bharadwaj
- Production company: AK Entertainments
- Release date: 14 October 2021
- Running time: 153 minutes
- Country: India
- Language: Telugu

Maha Samudram (transl. 'Ocean') is a 2021 Indian Telugu-language romantic action drama film written and directed by Ajay Bhupathi. It is produced by Ramabrahmam Sunkara under AK Entertainments. It stars Sharwanand, Siddharth, Aditi Rao Hydari, and Anu Emmanuel. The music is composed by Chaitan Bharadwaj. The film is set in Visakhapatnam of Andhra Pradesh. The film was released on 14 October 2021 to negative reviews.

== Plot ==
Vijay and Arjun are close friends. Vijay, an ambitious civil service aspirant with corrupt intentions, is an orphan and has a girlfriend named Mahalakshmi, a dance teacher. He is not serious about his relationship with Maha and lives in Arjun's house. Arjun lives with his widowed mother, who praises Vijay for being ambitious and hard-working despite being an orphan, unlike Arjun. Arjun also has an uncle, Chunchu Mama, who is a fisherman. Unlike Vijay, Arjun plans to start a business with the money his father accumulated before his death. Arjun meets Smitha, who initially misunderstands him, but later realises her mistake. They begin spending time together and eventually fall in love.

One day, Vijay takes Arjun to a factory producing illegal drugs and explains that it belongs to a smuggler named Dhanunjay, whose handicapped elder brother, Gooni Babji, created an indestructible crime syndicate. After witnessing their smuggling activities, Arjun appreciates Vijay and urges him to investigate them. However, Vijay reveals that he joined the police force to become influential and engage in illegal activities to earn money. Enraged, Arjun argues with Vijay. Vijay then follows Dhanunjay and ends up in their godown, where he accidentally stabs Dhanunjay. Later, a shocked Vijay meets Arjun and Chunchu and tells them about the incident. Chunchu advises him to flee for his safety. Arjun tells Vijay to leave for the railway station and offers to bring Maha there. After they arrive, Vijay abandons them. It is then revealed that Maha is pregnant with Vijay's child. Arjun brings her to his home, and he and his mother look after her. Chunchu advises Arjun to become a smuggler to escape Babji's wrath. Although hesitant at first, Arjun eventually becomes a smuggler and takes the blame for Vijay's mistake. Meanwhile, Maha gives birth to a girl and names her Pooja.

Four years later, Arjun becomes a leading smuggler, with Chunchu as his right-hand man. Maha and Pooja live with Arjun and his mother, and Maha does not reveal Vijay's identity to Pooja. Maha gradually develops feelings for Arjun. Arjun arrives at court for his case against Babji, where he meets Smitha, now a successful lawyer, and they begin spending time together again. Arjun introduces Smitha to his mother. Seeing Smitha, Maha becomes disappointed, believing that Smitha wishes to marry him. One day, Smitha realises Maha is in love with Arjun and advises him to marry Maha for the sake of Maha and Pooja's happiness. Meanwhile, Vijay returns to see Maha and finds her living with Pooja, Arjun, and his mother. Vijay misunderstands the situation. He later meets Babji and learns that Dhanunjay survived the stabbing but no longer handles their business.

Babji manipulates Vijay regarding his friendship with Arjun. Vijay discovers Arjun's location and confronts him, questioning him about his family. Arjun replies that he owes him no explanation. A fight breaks out between them, and Vijay joins forces with Babji. He kidnaps Pooja and Chunchu, during which Chunchu reveals that Pooja is Vijay's daughter and that Arjun became a smuggler because of Vijay's mistakes. Heartbroken upon learning the truth, Vijay frees Chunchu and embraces Pooja. Vijay then calls Arjun and tells him that he wishes to meet him not as an enemy, but as a friend, and that he will return Pooja to him. Arjun agrees, but on the way he meets with an accident orchestrated by Babji and loses consciousness. Babji arrives with his henchmen and shoots Vijay after discovering that Arjun and Vijay are reconciling. He then takes Pooja away with him. Arjun regains consciousness and finds Vijay dead. He heads to Babji's factory and rescues Pooja by killing Babji with Chunchu's help. In the end, Arjun, Maha, and Pooja are seen enjoying themselves on a beach, where Arjun proposes to Maha. She wholeheartedly accepts, and they live happily together.

== Cast ==
- Sharwanand as Arjun
- Siddharth as Vijay
- Aditi Rao Hydari as Mahalakshmi
- Anu Emmanuel as Smitha
- Jagapathi Babu as Chunchu Mama
- Rao Ramesh as Gooni Babji
- Ramachandra Raju as Danunjay
- Saranya Ponvannan as Arjun's mother
- Harsha Chemudu as Arjun's friend
- Aditi Pohankar as Revathi (credited uncut version)
- Ooha Reddy as Pooja
- Anand Ramaraju as Gabari
- Nanduri Srinivas as Priest
- Prabhu as SI
- Goparaju Ramana as Lakshmipathi
- Himanshu Kushwaha

== Production ==
In 2019, Ajay Bhupati mentioned in an interview a film with Bellamkonda Sreenivas in the lead. However, in early 2020, a bilingual film starring Sharwanand and Siddharth was announced. Naga Chaitanya and Samantha Ruth Prabhu were also considered for the lead roles, but this did not materialise.

In October 2020, Aditi Rao Hydari and Anu Emmanuel were cast in the film. Chaitan Bharadwaj who previously composed music for the films RX 100 (2018) and SR Kalyanamandapam (2021), was signed for film's soundtrack. After Jabardasth (2013), Siddharth made a straight comeback to Telugu cinema after 8 years. The film was originally intended to be shot simultaneously in Telugu and Tamil languages. However, the Tamil version was subsequently dropped in favour of a dubbed release.

The principal photography of the film began on 7 December 2020 and wrapped up on 9 July 2021.

== Soundtrack ==
Maha Samudram

Soundtrack album by Chaitan Bharadwaj
- Released: 24 October 2020 (Jukebox)
- Recorded: 2020
- Studios: Tweaknob Studios; Studio 47; Studio H
- Genres: Feature film soundtrack, Romance
- Length: 18:42
- Language: Telugu
- Label: Sony Music India
- Producer: Chaitan Bharadwaj

Chaitan Bharadwaj chronology
SR Kalyanamandapam (2021)	Maha Samudram (2021)	Vinaro Bhagyamu Vishnu Katha (2023)
External audio
- Audio Jukebox on YouTube

The songs were composed by Chaitan Bharadwaj.

No.	Title	Lyrics	Singer(s)	Length
1.	"Hey Rambha Rambha"	Bhaskarabhatla	Chaitan Bharadwaj	3:33
2.	"Cheppake Cheppake"	Chaitanya Prasad	Deepthi Parthasarathy	4:43
3.	"Hey Thikamaka Modale"	Kittu Vissapragada	Haricharan, Nutana Mohan	3:54
4.	"Jagadale Raani"	Bhaskarabhatla	Vedala Hemachandra	3:19
5.	"Manasu Marige Mounamgane"	Chaitanya Prasad	Gowtham Bharadwaj	3:13
Total length:				17.62

== Reception ==
123Telugu gave the film 2.75/5 stars and wrote, "On the whole, Maha Samudram does not live up to the hype created. The film has an impressive backdrop and scope for solid drama but they are not utilized well." Neeshita Nyayapati of The Times of India gave the film 2.5/5 stars and wrote, "Irrespective of what a good job Ajay does at sketching out his characters (he truly excels at the minute detailing), his screenplay falters at keeping your attention hooked. As good as the story seems on paper, the film is utterly predictable and every ‘twist’ can be smelled from a mile away." Srivathsan Nadadhur of OTTPlay gave the film 2.5/5 stars and wrote, "Maha Samudram is a largely watchable gangster saga with a few silver linings. Yet it's disappointing that Ajay Bhupathi does so little with such wonderful talents in the lineup." Sangeetha Devi Dundoo of The Hindu wrote, "The biggest issue with Maha Samudram is that despite its grand intent, it never feels enough. The whistle-worthy masala moments are few and far between and the story doesn’t suck us into the whirlwind of proceedings completely."

== Release ==
The film was initially scheduled to be released on 19 August 2021, but was postponed due to the COVID-19 pandemic. In August 2021, the new release date was announced as 14 October 2021.
