= Kiran Abbavaram =

Indian actor

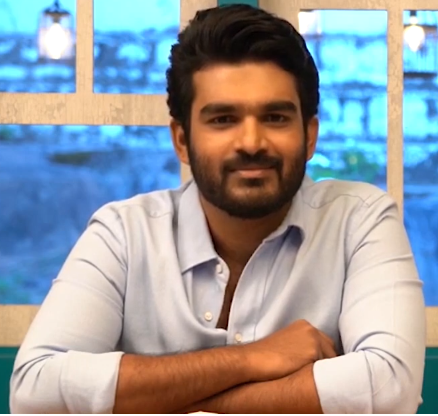
- Abbavaram in 2022
- Born: Kiran Kumar Reddy Abbavaram; 15 July 1992 (age 34); Rayachoti, Andhra Pradesh, India
- Occupations: Actor; Writer; Producer; Director
- Years active: 2019–present
- Spouse: Rahasya Gorak (m. 2024)
- Children: 1

Kiran Abbavaram (born 15 July 1992) is an Indian actor, writer, producer, and director who works in Telugu cinema. He made his acting debut in 2019 with romantic comedy film Raja Vaaru Rani Gaaru.

Abbavaram later appeared in SR Kalyanamandapam (2021), where he was also a writer.

== Personal life ==
Kiran Abbavaram was born on 15 July 1992 in Rayachoti, Andhra Pradesh. He holds B. Tech (Bachelor of Technology) and previously worked as a network consultant for 2.5 years in Chennai and Bangalore. He started doing short films while working a separate job. Abbavaram later left that position to pursue a full-time career in films. One of his short films, Sreekaram, was remade into a feature film with the same name in 2021.

Abbavaram got engaged to his co-artist from Raja Vaaru Rani Gaaru, Rahasya Gorak, on 13 March 2024. They married in August 2024 at a private ceremony in Coorg, Karnataka. The couple announced their pregnancy with a social media post on 21 January 2025 and were blessed with a baby boy on 22 May 2025.

== Career ==
Kiran Abbavaram made his debut with Raja Vaaru Rani Gaaru (2019). Sangeetha Devi of The Hindu stated in her review: "Abbavaram shows he is no longer a mere YouTube or a short film sensation — he has the looks and promises to be a part of good stories and movies". He achieved greater recognition and appreciation with his second film, SR Kalyanamandapam, which he also wrote. The film received positive reviews from critics and was a box office success.

In 2022, Abbavaram starred in two films—Sebastian P.C. 524 and Sammathame. Murali Krishna CH of The New Indian Express called Sebastian a half-hearted drama but opined Abbavaram's performance was its biggest strength.

In 2023, Abbavaram had 3 releases, Vinaro Bhagyamu Vishnu Katha, Meter, and Rules Ranjann. Meter was panned badly and Rules Ranjann was an average fare with critics praising it for its comedic elements. In 2024, he starred in KA, directed by Sujith-Sandeep.

In 2025, Abbavaram starred in Dilruba. He appeared in the film K-Ramp opposite Yukti Thareja. He went on to produce the feature film Thimmarajupalli TV that was released in 2026.

His next, Chennai Love Story was theatrically released in 2026.

== Filmography ==
Year	Title	Role	Notes	Ref.
2019	Raja Vaaru Rani Gaaru	Raja	Nominated–SIIMA Award for Best Male Debut – Telugu	
2021	SR Kalyanamandapam	Kalyan	Also writer	
2022	Sebastian P.C. 524	Sebastian		
2022	Sammathame	Krishna		
2022	Nenu Meeku Baga Kavalsinavaadini	Vivek / Pavan	Also writer	
2023	Vinaro Bhagyamu Vishnu Katha	Vishnu		
2023	Meter	Arjun Kalyan		
2023	Rules Ranjann	Manoranjan "Ranjan"		
2024	KA	Abhinaya Vasudev and KA Peddha Sir	Dual role	
2025	Dilruba	Siddhu		
2025	K-Ramp	Kumar Abbavaram		
2026	Thimmarajupalli TV	Himself (voiceover)	Also producer	
2026	Chennai Love Story	Steven Shankar		
2026	Reality †	Anandam	Also writer and director	
TBA	KA 2 †	Abhinaya Vasudev and KA Peddha Sir	Dual role	

=== Television ===
Year	Title	Role	Network	Notes	Ref.
2025	Dance Ikon season 2 Wildfire	Guest	aha		
