= Chiclets (film) =

- Theatrical release poster in Tamil
- Directed by: Muthu M.
- Written by: Muthu M.
- Produced by: S Srinivasan Guru
- Starring: Sathvik Varma; Jack Robinson; Nayan Karishma
- Cinematography: Kolanchi Kumar
- Music by: Balamurali Balu
- Production company: SSB Films
- Release date: 2 February 2024
- Country: India
- Languages: Tamil; Telugu

Chiclets is a 2024 Indian teen drama film written and directed by Muthu M. Shot simultaneously in Tamil and Telugu, the film stars Sathvik Varma, Jack Robinson and Nayan Karishma in the lead roles. The film was produced by S Srinivasan Guru under the banner of SSB Films.

== Cast ==
- Sathvik Varma
- Jack Robinson
- Nayan Karishma as Riya
- Amrita Halder as Anusha
- Manjeera as Ambi
- Surekha Vani as Keerthi
- Sriman as Anusha's father
- Manobala as Pharmacist
- Sampath Ram

== Production ==
The film was produced by S Srinivasan Guru under the banner of Ssb Films. The cinematography was done by Kolanchi Kumar. The film was shot across Tamil Nadu, Visakhapatnam and Hyderabad.

== Reception ==
Roopa Radhakrishnan of The Times of India rated 1.5 out of 5 and noted that "The preachiness aspect goes in and out of Chiclets, similar to the way the film itself is confused about what it wants to say." Times Now critic rated 1.5 out of 5 and wrote that "Some of the sequences are downright sleazy and some have double meaning dialogues that are not bound to go down well with a certain segment of audiences". Maalai Malar critic wrote that "Director Muthu has directed the film as an awareness of how to get past it without getting caught up in love and lust in old age".
