= Nenu Meeku Baaga Kavalsinavaadini =

- Theatrical release poster
- Directed by: Sridhar Gade
- Written by: Kiran Abbavaram
- Produced by: Kodi Divya Deepthi
- Starring: Kiran Abbavaram; Sanjana Anand; Sonu Thakur; Siddharth Menon
- Cinematography: Raj K. Nalli
- Edited by: Prawin Pudi
- Music by: Mani Sharma
- Production company: Kodi Divyaa Entertainments
- Release date: 16 September 2022
- Running time: 130 minutes
- Country: India
- Language: Telugu

Nenu Meeku Baaga Kavalsinavaadini (transl. I am the one you need the most) is a 2022 Indian Telugu-language romantic comedy action film directed by Sridhar Gade and written by Kiran Abbavaram. It stars Abbavaram, Sanjana Anand, Sonu Thakur and Siddharth Menon. The film has music composed by Mani Sharma.

Nenu Meeku Baaga Kavalsinavaadini was released theatrically on 16 September 2022.

== Plot ==
A sympathetic cabbie named Vivek (Kiran Abbavaram) lends a distressed woman named Teju a shoulder to cry on after coming to know that she has been aloof from her family post her estrangement from them following the cancellation of her wedding. Vivek tries to ask what happened and Teju says that she loved a man but her dad found a marriage alliance for her at the same time. The couple decide to elope but right before they leave the city, Teju's boyfriend reveals that he wanted to get revenge and was actually Teju's sister's ex-boyfriend. Teju's sister fell into the same plight as Teju but she married the boy and left him. Hence why he wanted to give the same feeling of sadness to Teju. Teju, heartbroken becomes an alcoholic and lives away from her family. Vivek convinces Teju to go back to her family and apologize and that they will forgive her. He drops her near her house and on the journey love blossoms between the two. Teju reunites with her family. Teju thanks Vivek and Vivek tells a secret to Teju. It is revealed that Vivek was actually the groom that Teju's dad found and did all of this to find out why Teju eloped and her story. He apologizes to her and the movie ends with the couple reuniting.

== Cast ==
- Kiran Abbavaram as Vivek/Pavan
- Sanjana Anand as Theju
- Sonu Thakur as Lawyer Durga
- Siddharth Menon as Siddhu/Kalyaan
- S. V. Krishna Reddy as Theju's father
- Baba Bhaskar as Pavan's uncle
- Sameer as Theju's uncle
- Getup Srinu
- Sangeetha
- Niharika
- Pramodini
- Bharat Rongali as Security Guard
- Jabardast Nukaraju
- Divya Rahlan as Jasmine, special appearance in the song "Attaanti Ittaanti"

== Music ==
The music was composed by Mani Sharma.

Nenu Meeku Baaga Kavalsinavaadini

Soundtrack album by Mani Sharma
- Released: 2022
- Genre: Feature film soundtrack
- Length: 23:55
- Language: Telugu
- Label: Lahari Music
- Producer: Mani Sharma

Mani Sharma chronology
| Balamevvadu (2022) | Nenu Meeku Baaga Kavalsinavaadini (2022) | S5 No Exit (2022) |
External audio
- Nenu Meeku Baaga Kavalsinavaadini – Jukebox on YouTube

Track listing
| No. | Title | Lyrics | Singer(s) | Length |
|---|---|---|---|---|
| 1. | "Lawyer Papa" | Bhaskarabhatla | Ram Miriyala | 3:44 |
| 2. | "Nachav Abbai" | Bhaskarabhatla | Dhanunjay Seepana, Lipsika | 4:22 |
| 3. | "Attaanti Ittaanti" | Kasarla Shyam | Saketh Komanduri, Keerthana Sharma | 3:49 |
| 4. | "Chala Bagundhe" | Bhaskarabhatla | Aditya Iyengar | 3:32 |
| 5. | "Manase (Family Song)" | Bhaskarabhatla | Sri Krishna, Ramya Behara | 4:30 |
| 6. | "Manasoka Maate" | Bhaskarabhatla | Anurag Kulkarni, Sahithi Chaganti | 3:57 |
| Total length: | | | | 23:55 |

== Reception ==
The Times of India critic Paul Nicodemus stated that "though not groundbreaking, this masala entertainer is a decent effort by Sridhar Gadhe and the team that would appeal to the audiences looking for lighthearted entertainment." Sakshi gave a mixed review for the film, appreciating the performances and music while criticizing the screenplay. Eenadu also echoed the same, stating the film follows a routine format without bringing any novelty.

Lakshminarayana Varanasi of TV9 Telugu felt the film suffers from lackluster screenplay.

== Home media ==
The movie was released on aha
