= Mix Up (film) =

- Promotional release poster
- Directed by: Aakash Bikki
- Written by: Hyma Varshini
- Produced by: Thirumal Reddy Amireddy
- Starring: Kamal Kamaraju; Akshara Gowda
- Cinematography: Dinesh K. Babu
- Edited by: Satya Giduturi
- Music by: Koushik
- Production company: Sprint Films
- Distributed by: Aha
- Release date: 15 March 2024
- Running time: 89 minutes
- Country: India
- Language: Telugu

Mix Up is a 2024 Indian Telugu-language Erotic drama film directed by Aakash Bikki and written by Hyma Varshini. Produced by Sprint Films, the film stars Kamal Kamaraju and Akshara Gowda. The film premiered on 15 March 2024 on Aha.

== Cast ==
- Kamal Kamaraju as Abhay; Nikki's husband
- Pooja Jhaveri as Maithili, Sahu's wife
- Aadarsh Balakrishna as Sahu
- Akshara Gowda as Nikhita "Nikki"
- Kamakshi Bhaskarla as Ritu

== Production ==
The film was announced on Aha. The teaser was released on 24 February 2024 followed by the trailer of the film.

== Reception ==
Avad Mohammad of OTTPlay gave 1.5/5 stars.

The film was reviewed by Bhavana Sharma for Deccan Chronicle and Neeshita Nyayapati for Hindustan Times.
