= Sebastian P.C. 524 =

2022 Indian Telugu-language film

- Theatrical release poster
- Directed by: Balaji Sayyapureddy
- Produced by: Siddha Reddy B Raju; Pramod
- Starring: Kiran Abbavaram; Nuveksha
- Cinematography: Raj K. Nalli
- Edited by: Viplav Nyshadam
- Music by: Ghibran
- Production company: Jovitha Cinemas
- Distributed by: Primeshow Films
- Release date: 4 March 2022
- Country: India
- Language: Telugu

Sebastian P.C. 524 is a 2022 Indian Telugu-language Crime thriller film written and directed by Balaji Sayyapureddy. The film stars Kiran Abbavaram and Nuveksha in the lead roles. The film is produced by Siddha Reddy B, Raju, Pramod under the banner Jovitha Cinemas. The film's soundtrack is composed by Ghibran and the editing is done by Viplav Nyshadam. The film was theatrically released on 4 March 2022. The film received negative reviews form critics on release.

== Plot ==
Sebastian (Kiran Abbavaram) is a well-meaning youngster whose late mother (Rohini) is his world. Before she died, his mother asked him to safeguard his cop job securely by concealing the fact about his Night-blindness.

Just as he gets posted in Madanapalle in Chittoor district, a young housewife named Neelima (Komalee Prasad) gets murdered. In this case the suspects are Dr.Chakravathy (Surya), Neelima's father in law who lusts on her and treats Seba for his night-blindness, Heli(Nuveksha) who loves Rahul a NRI but can't marry him because of there religion later marries Neelima because of that she owes to kill her but the fate turns out she became Seba's fiance, and Teja (Raja Vikram) who loves Neelima because of caste differences they drops from their relationship and he is the best friend of Seba. All the 3 knows his condition.

Sebastian is assigned night duty to protect evidence in the murdered house. But, the suspects take advantage of him to destroy the evidence. Sebastian gets suspended but later manages to trap the people and arrest them. However due to fear of losing his job if the suspects reveal his night-blindness, he releases them and the case is closed. Sebastian later regrets his decision and suffers because of him the criminal is still walking free.

Two years later he finds a minor clue which is a rare poison which aborts of pregnant women. Later Sebastian manages to trap the criminal who happened to be the Neelima's lover and his best friend Teja. he killed her because he forced Neelima to leave her husband Rahul and marry him in that process Neelima became pregnant of Rahul's child after knowing this Teja decided to abort her child for that he gives a poisoned cake which aborts a pregnant but the dosage became high and Neelima also died in the course of events. While arresting, Teja reveals his night blindness to the higher officials, but they support Sebastian and offer promotion but Sebastian rejects the promotion and resigns his job and decides to leave according to his concise and marries Heli who is now reformed.

== Cast ==
- Kiran Abbavaram as P.C. Sebastian
- Nuveksha as Heli, Rahul's former lover and Seba's fiance.
- Komalee Prasad as Neelima
- Rohini as Mary, Sebastian’s mother
- Surya as Dr. Chakravarthy, Rahul’s father and Sebastian's personal Doctor.
- Srikanth Iyengar as S.I. Ambaram
- George Maryan as Father Sree Paul
- Adarsh Balakrishna as Rahul, Neelima’s husband
- Raja Vikram as Teja, Neelima's former lover and Seba's best friend.
- Ravi Teja Nannimala as P.C. Niranjan, Seba's colleague.
- Namrata Darekar

== Production ==
The film was launched with a pooja ceremony on 1 December 2021. Filming took place in Madanapalle in Andhra Pradesh over 32 days.

Digital streaming rights are obtained by aha

== Release ==
Sebastian P.C. 524 was released on 4 March 2022. Initially, the release date was 25 February, but it was pushed back by a week in order to avoid clashing with Bheemla Nayak.

== Reception ==
Murali Krishna CH of The New Indian Express gave the film a rating of 2.5/5 and wrote, "Sebastian PC 524 settles for being an average, half-hearted drama, despite having a promising story. Had Balaji Sayyapureddy invested equal efforts in the screenplay, the film would have been a memorable outing". Thadhagath Pathi of The Times of India gave the film a rating of 2/5 and wrote, "The story of Sebastian PC 524 has scope for so much more but the makers seem to hardly try. Even the short duration of the film feels long – and that says it all". Y. Sunita Chowdhary of The Hindu stated, "A crime comedy following a constable with night blindness, suffers from poor narration".
