= Chaitan Bharadwaj =

Indian music composer

- Born: Yadavalli Prabhakar Chaitanya; 22 July 1988 (age 38); Visakhapatnam, Andhra Pradesh, India
- Occupations: Vocalist, film scorer
- Instruments: Vocals, keyboards, synthesizer
- Labels: Mango Music, Lahari Music, Sony Music India

Chaitan Bharadwaj (born 22 July 1988) is an Indian music composer who works predominantly in Tollywood and Telugu Music. He is best known for composing the music album of the 2018 Tollywood film RX 100. He composed the song "Pillaa Raa".

== Discography ==
=== As composer ===
Year	Film
2018	RX 100
2019	Seven
2019	Guna 369
2019	Manmadhudu 2
2021	SR Kalyanamandapam
2021	Maha Samudram
2023	Vinaro Bhagyamu Vishnu Katha
2023	Mama Mascheendra
2024	Gam Gam Ganesha
2024	Harom Hara
2024	Viswam
2025	Kishkindhapuri
2025	K-Ramp
2026	Rambha Urvasi Menaka

=== As playback singer ===
Year	Song	Film
2019	"Hey Menina"	Manmadhudu 2
2020	"Merise Merise"	SR Kalyanamandapam
2021	"Hey Rambha Rambha"	Maha Samudram
2025	"Onam"	K-Ramp

== Awards and nominations ==
Year	Awards	Category	Film	Result
2018	Zee Cine Awards Telugu	Best Music Director	RX 100	Nominated
2019	8th South Indian International Movie Awards	SIIMA Award for Best Music Director (Telugu)	RX 100	Nominated
2026	70th Filmfare Awards South	Best Music Director	Harom Hara	Nominated
