= Aay (film) =

2024 Indian film by Anji K Maniputhra

- Theatrical release poster
- Directed by: Anji K. Maniputhra
- Written by: Anji K. Maniputhra
- Produced by: Bunny Vas; Vidya Koppineedi; Riyaz Chowdary; Bhanu Pratapa
- Starring: Narne Nithin; Nayan Sarika; Rajkumar Kasireddy; Ankith Koyya
- Cinematography: Sameer Kalyani
- Edited by: Kodati Pavan Kalyan
- Music by: Score: Ajaya Arasada; Songs: Ram Miriyala; Ajaya Arasada
- Production company: GA2 Pictures
- Release date: 16 August 2024
- Running time: 139 minutes
- Country: India
- Language: Telugu
- Box office: ₹16.50 crore

Aay is a 2024 Indian Telugu-language romantic comedy film written and directed by Anji K. Maniputhra. The film features Narne Nithin, Nayan Sarika, Rajkumar Kasireddy and Ankith Koyya in important roles. Aay was released on 16 August 2024.

== Plot ==
Karthik, a software engineer from Hyderabad, harbours resentment towards his father, Burayya, due to their strained relationship and financial struggles. Burayya, who is often ill and dependent on handouts, is blamed by Karthik for preventing him from securing a college seat in the past. This situation led Karthik to leave his hometown, and over time, he became estranged from his childhood friends, Subbu and Hari, despite their continued affection for him. During the COVID-19 pandemic, Karthik returns to his village to work remotely, where he begins reconnecting with his friends, though his relationship with Burayya remains distant.

While in the village, Karthik falls in love with Pallavi, a college student and the daughter of Durga, a local politician. Pallavi, who belongs to a different caste, initially rejects Subbu's long-time one-sided affection and starts a relationship with Karthik, to which Subbu finally agrees. However, fearing her father's disapproval due to caste differences, Pallavi accepts an arranged marriage proposal and urges Karthik to remain friends, asking him to respect her decision. Karthik is confused by her behaviour, especially when she invites him to help with her wedding preparations.

Subbu and Hari, determined to help Karthik and Pallavi, decide to kill Durga to eliminate the caste obstacle. Their multiple attempts fail comically, and Pallavi soon learns of their plan. Karthik confronts her and learns that Pallavi is struggling with depression over their situation, feeling that their love cannot overcome the caste divide. Despite this, she has tried to maintain a cheerful façade to avoid suspicion and to spend more time with Karthik. Their interaction is interrupted when her uncle, Bose, catches them together. Karthik pleads with Bose not to harm him publicly, promising to respect Pallavi's decision and stay away from her. Bose lets him go, and the wedding preparations continue.

On the wedding day, Karthik vents his frustrations to Burayya, blaming him for their financial troubles and wishing they were as wealthy as Durga to have a chance at marrying Pallavi. Burayya, in an emotional moment, goes to Durga and requests his approval for Karthik and Pallavi's marriage. Burayya tearfully explains that this might be his only opportunity to offer something to Karthik, having denied him many wishes in the past. Upon hearing of Burayya's unexpected request, Karthik, Subbu, and Hari rush to the wedding hall, worried for Burayya's safety. To their surprise, Durga fully supports Karthik and Pallavi's marriage and cancels the wedding, announcing that they will marry at a later date.

Pallavi is initially concerned that Durga's approval is part of a scheme to harm Karthik, but Durga reassures her that he genuinely supports their union. Meanwhile, the trio discovers from an elderly man that Durga and Burayya were once close friends, and that Burayya once secretly helped him during a financial crisis, refusing repayment and choosing to preserve their friendship over their caste differences. Burayya's selflessness, including his refusal to use the money he gave Durga to secure Karthik's college seat, helps Karthik understand his father's actions. In the end, Karthik gains a newfound admiration for Burayya, Subbu and Hari, and the film closes with the celebration of Karthik and Pallavi's marriage, surrounded by their families and loved ones.

== Cast ==
- Narne Nithin as Karthik
- Nayan Sarika as 'Funk' Pallavi
- Rajkumar Kasireddy as Subhash (Subbu)
- Ankith Koyya as Hari
- Vinod Kumar Alva as Burayya
- Mime Gopi as Durga
- Krishna Chaitanya
- VTV Ganesh as Manager Kishore
- Surabhi Prabhavathi
- Sri Vani Tripuraneni
- Srinivas Vadlamani

== Music ==
Aay

Soundtrack album by Ram Miriyala and Ajay Arasada
- Released: 2024
- Recorded: 2024
- Language: Telugu
- Label: Junglee Music
- Producer: Ram Miriyala

The film's soundtrack album is composed by Ram Miriyala and Ajay Arasada, while the background score is composed by Ajay Arasada. The first single "Sufiyana" was released on 20 March 2024.

Track list
No.	Title	Lyrics	Music	Singer(s)	Length
1.	"Sufiyana"	Sri Mani	Ram Miriyala	Ram Miriyala, Sameera Bharadwaj, Ramya Shree	4:03
2.	"Ranganayaki"	Suresh Banisetti	Ram Miriyala	Anurag Kulkarni	4:10
3.	"Amma Laalo Ram Bhajana"	Anji K Maniputhra	Ajay Arasada	Penchal Das	3:36
4.	"Entha Andhamo"	Kasarla Shyam	Ajay Arasada	Mangli	3:30

== Release ==
Aay was initially scheduled release on 15 August 2024, thus having a three-way clash with Mr. Bachchan and Double iSmart, which were released on the same day. To avoid the clash, the film was rescheduled to release on 16 August 2024. Post-theatrical digital streaming rights were acquired by Netflix and was premiered on 12 September 2024.

== Reception ==
Appreciating the Anji K. Maniputhra's work, and the performance of Rajkumar Kasireddy and Ankith Koyya, Sangeetha Devi Dundoo of The Hindu stated, "An enjoyable, lighthearted social drama from the Godavari region". Pratyusha Sista of Telangana Today echoed the same, calling it "worth watching".
