= Raja Vaaru Rani Gaaru =

- Theatrical release poster
- Directed by: Ravi Kiran Kola
- Written by: Ravi Kiran Kola
- Based on: Ravi Kiran Kola's real life experiences he witnessed since his childhood in his hometown.
- Produced by: Manovikas D. Media9 Manoj
- Starring: Kiran Abbavaram; Rahasya Gorak
- Cinematography: Vidya Sagar Chinta; Amardeep Guttula
- Edited by: Viplav Nyshadam
- Music by: Jay Krish
- Production company: SL Entertainments
- Distributed by: Suresh Productions
- Release date: 29 November 2019
- Country: India
- Language: Telugu

Raja Vaaru Rani Gaaru (transl. Raja sir, Rani madam) is a 2019 Indian Telugu-language romantic drama film directed by Ravi Kiran Kola and starring debutantes Kiran Abbavaram and Rahasya Gorak with Yazurved Gurram and Rajkumar Kasireddy in supporting roles.

== Plot ==
The film is about how Raja is scared to express his love to Rani because of his fear that he will get rejected.

== Cast ==
- Kiran Abbavaram as Raja
- Rahasya Gorak as Rani
- Yazurved Gurram as Naidu
- Rajkumar Kasireddy as Chowdary
- Divya Narni as Swetha
- Sneha Madhuri Sharma as Geetha
- Kedhar Shankar as Raja's father
- Durga as Raja's mother
- Bogireddy Srinivas as Rani's father
- Bombay Padma as Rani's grandmother
- Chotu Chery as Rani's brother-in-law

== Production ==
The film was shot in Kapileswarapuram, East Godavari district. Two hundred people were selected to star in the film and auditions were held to choose the right cast. Debutantes Yazurved and Rajkumar Kasireddy were brought in for comedy portions. Suresh Productions distributed the film.

== Soundtrack ==
Newcomer Jay Krish composed the music.

No.	Title	Singer(s)	Length
1.	"Title Song"	Anurag Kulkarni	5:10
2.	"Nammela Ledhe"	Anurag Kulkarni	4:22
3.	"Pain Song"	Anurag Kulkarni	3:15
4.	"Get Well Soon"	Hariharasudhan	4:45
5.	"Tirigi Tirigi"	Jay Krish, Ramya Behara	3:09
Total length:			21:41

== Reception ==
A critic from The Times of India gave the film a rating of three out of five stars and said that "Go watch this one this weekend if you're looking for a feel-good love story that’ll leave you with a happy smile on your face". A critic from The Hindu said that "Raja Vaaru Rani Gaaru is a fun, heart warming and cute film that throws up fresh and abundant talent not just in the form of artistes but crew too".

== Home media ==
The movie was released on aha and Amazon Prime Video.
