= Raakaasa =

2026 Indian Telugu film by Manasa Sharma

- Directed by: Manasa Sharma
- Written by: Manasa Sharma
- Produced by: Niharika Konidela; Umesh Kumar Bansal
- Starring: Sangeeth Sobhan; Nayan Sarika
- Cinematography: Edurolu Raju
- Edited by: Anwar Ali
- Music by: Anudeep Dev
- Production companies: Pink Elephant Pictures; Zee Studios
- Distributed by: Zee Studios
- Release date: 3 April 2026
- Running time: 133 minutes
- Country: India
- Language: Telugu
- Box office: ₹27 crore

Raakaasa is a 2026 Indian Telugu-language fantasy film written and directed by Manasa Sharma. It stars Sangeeth Sobhan and Nayan Sarika.

The film was released on 3 April 2026. The Telugu horror film was premiered on Netflix on May 1 2026.

== Plot ==
A castle located on the outskirts of a village is believed to be inhabited by a demon named Raakaasa. According to a centuries-old legend, the demon demands a human sacrifice approximately every 500 years in exchange for sparing the village from destruction. The villagers receive three warnings before the sacrifice is due: a meteor shower visible over the village, the unexplained death of cattle, and the appearance of a mysterious stone outside the castle. Fearing the consequences, the villagers have continued the ritual for generations. During the previous cycle, a toddler was offered as a sacrifice.

Veerababu “Veeru” (Sangeeth Sobhan) returns from the United States to his native village, hoping to marry his longtime lover Sukhanya. However, he is devastated to learn that she is marrying Mahesh on the very same day. Veeru's friend Balu (Getup Srinu) suggests using black magic to bring Sukanya under Veeru's control. The two approach Subbalakshmi (Nayan Sarika) to perform the ritual, but the plan fails and Sukanya marries Mahesh.

Heartbroken, Veeru becomes intoxicated and accidentally falls asleep outside the castle after taking the wrong route home. The next morning, the villagers discover him wearing a torn shirt belonging to Somu (Vennela Kishore), a villager who had recently disappeared. Veeru is brought before the village panchayat, where Somu's wife Savithri confirms that the shirt belongs to her husband. Suspecting Veeru's involvement in Somu's disappearance, the village elders punish him by socially boycotting him and his family. Despite this, Subbalakshmi helps Veeru by bringing groceries and assisting with household work. She later informs him that an elderly villager, Gangayya Thatha, had seen Somu on the night of his disappearance.

Soon afterward, the first and second warnings of Raakaasa's return appear, causing panic among the villagers. Days later, the third warning also manifests. Village head Parasuram (Brahmaji) and priest Chari (Tanikella Bharani) decide to choose a human sacrifice. Gangayya Thatha's name is selected, and preparations are made to send him into the castle. Veeru opposes the ritual, insisting that the legend is merely folklore and that nothing exists inside the castle. However, Gangayya Thatha dies before the sacrifice can take place.

As a replacement, the villagers decide to send Balu, but Veeru again attempts to stop them. Ignoring his pleas, the villagers instead choose Veeru himself as the sacrifice and force him into the castle.

Meanwhile, Subbalakshmi studies ancient scriptures and discovers that Raakaasa can be killed only if two special knives are simultaneously inserted into the demon's back. Inside the castle, Veeru encounters Somu, who reveals that Savithri had secretly sent him into the castle through an alternate route to steal hidden jewels. Raakaasa attacks the two, but they narrowly escape.

The pair later discover inscriptions revealing that Maharaja Prataparudra (Thakur Anoop Singh) had once attempted to kill Raakaasa and successfully embedded one of the two knives into the demon's back. However, the second knife was lost within the castle. Subbalakshmi and Balu enter the castle through another route and inform Veeru about the ancient prophecy. Together, they search for the second knife while evading Raakaasa's attacks.

After locating the missing knife, the group prepares to kill the demon. However, instead of using the second knife, Veeru removes the first knife already lodged in Raakaasa's back. He realizes that the demon had been caring for the toddler who was sacrificed during the previous cycle and that the child was accidentally killed during Maharaja Prataparudra's attack. Freed from centuries of suffering and grief, Raakaasa dies peacefully. Veeru, Subbalakshmi, Balu, and Somu escape the castle safely.

== Cast ==
- Sangeeth Sobhan as Veerababu "Veeru"
- Nayan Sarika as Subbalakshmi "Subbu"
- Vennela Kishore as Somu
- Getup Srinu as Kanne Pongula Balaraju "Balu", Veeru’s friend
- Brahmaji as Parasuram, Village President
- Tanikella Bharani as Chari, Subbu’s father
- Ashish Vidyarthi as Ramesh
- Sukhwinder Singh Grewal as Demon "Raakaasa"
- Thakur Anoop Singh as Maharaja Prataparudra
- Posani Krishna Murali as Home Minister Bhanuprakash
- Vasu Inturi as SI Narasimha Rao
- Annapurna as Mangamma, Veeru's grandmother
- Rohini Reddy Noni as Savithri, Somu’s wife
- Rohan Roy as Ananda, Subbu’s brother
- Rajasekhar Aningi as Maharaja’s advisor
- Prem Kosireddy as Maharaja’s assistant
- Katta Anthony as Gangayya Thatha
- Kishore Kumar Polimera as Villager
- Raadhya Suresh as Sukanya, Veeru’s ex-girlfriend
- Chaitanya Varma as Mahesh, Sukanya’s fiancee
- Chandamama Dhanvika Sasha as Raakaasa’s adoptive daughter (Cameo)
- Ravi Mariya as Inspector Subba Rao

== Music ==
The background score and songs were composed by Anudeep Dev.

Track listing
No.	Title	Lyrics	Singer(s)	Length
1.	"Snake Dance"	Raghuram	Benny Dayal, Maneesha Pandranki, Ritesh G Rao, Lakshmi Meghana, Vinayak	3:19
2.	"Padhe Padhe"	Kittu Vissapragada	Sindhuja Srinivasan	4:08
3.	"Rapappa"	Raghuram	Ram Miriyala	3:07

== Release ==
Raakaasa was released on 3 April 2026. Post-theatrical digital streaming rights were acquired by Netflix.

== Reception ==
Suresh Kavirayani of The New Indian Express rated it 3 out of 5 and noted the lead cast performances, cinematography and visual effects, while particularly writing that "Overall, Raakaasa's strong second half is why the film works". Writing for The Hindu, Srivathsan Nadadhur stated in his review that, "RaaKaaSaa has many compelling ideas up its sleeve, but ultimately settles for being a safe popcorn entertainer rather than a fantasy saga" while noting Sangeeth, Kishore and Srinu's comedic performances. Echoing the same, T Maruthi Acharya of India Today rated the film 2.5 out of 5 and was further critical towards the writing. BVS Prakash of Deccan Chronicle rated it 1.5 out of 5 calling it "illogical, regressive socio fantasy film".
