= Vishnu Vinyasam =

2026 Indian Telugu film by Yadunaath Maruthi Rao

- Theatrical release poster
- Directed by: Yadunaath Maruthi Rao
- Written by: Yadunaath Maruthi Rao
- Produced by: Sumanth Naidu G
- Starring: Sree Vishnu; Nayan Sarika
- Cinematography: Sai Sriram
- Edited by: Kartikeyan Rohini
- Music by: Radhan
- Production company: Sree Subrahmanyeshwara Cinemas
- Release date: 27 February 2026
- Running time: 119 minutes
- Country: India
- Language: Telugu
- Box office: ₹18 crore

Vishnu Vinyasam is a 2026 Indian Telugu-language romantic comedy film written and directed by Yadunaath Maruthi Rao. It stars Sree Vishnu and Nayan Sarika.

The film was released on 27 February 2026 to mixed reviews from critics and audiences. It went on to gross over ₹18 crore at the box office, emerging as a moderate commercial success, performing better than Vishnu's other film, Mrithyunjay which was also scheduled to release on the same day, but was postponed to a week later.

== Plot ==
Manisha is a 27-year-old unmarried woman. No one is interested in marrying her due to some reasons. She later transferred to Sri Pratibha Junior College as one of the faculties, where she learns about one of the junior lecturers, Vishnu, a 30-something-year-old single man and an extreme follower of astrology. The other faculties inform her that Vishnu is inept and their intention is to dismiss him from the college. But she interferes and convinces the other faculties that she can change him into a better lecturer, which the others agree to. She later informs Vishnu about the incidents and admits she saved him from losing the job because she's also a smoker, and shares a cigarette with him. Later, that night she asks him to buy her vodka, which she gulps. After getting drunk, she asks him to kiss her, but he refuses and drops her off at her house. Once in front of the house, she urges him to kiss her, but he slaps her and tells her he's not that kind of guy. She admits she likes him, that's why she asked him to kiss her, not with other intentions, which moves him.

The next day, after telling his astrologer about Manisha over the phone, Vishnu reciprocates Manisha's advances and they kiss. Manisha and Vishnu see each other daily and develop feelings. Later, at a party for the college staff, Manisha pretends she doesn't drink alcohol. Pankaj reveals she drank vodka with Vishnu and Vishnu told him. He also tells her Vishnu's seeing her because their lucky number is five – and Vishnu believes in astrology. Manisha yells at Vishnu, pretending she is leaving him, which prompts Vishnu to propose. She reveals she has a Mangala Dosha – the first person to marry her will die within six months of marriage. Although initially frightened, Vishnu reluctantly agrees to the marriage as she pursues him, reminding him of his proposal. He meets her parents and convinces his own. They marry in a simple private ceremony; Manisha's parents prefer a simple private wedding due to debt. After the marriage, a car hits Vishnu; he narrowly survives but is badly injured. At the hospital, Manisha and her parents visit him, but they separate the couple, citing an astrology issue causing the misfortune – they must be apart for six months.

Four months later, Vishnu has recovered and confesses everything to his parents. His mother asks if Manisha really loved him. He replies to his mother that Manisha met him the day before his marriage and told him she'd seen him a year before their college meeting. She was in love with Vishnu because of his caring attitude, which is why she decided to marry him. After learning everything, Vishnu's parents take Manisha and Vishnu to Guruji, the astrologer they trust, who reveals the Jathakam Manisha brought was forged – someone added Mangala Dosha to the birth chart. He shows them the original birth chart has no such dosha. Vishnu confronts Manisha's father, who admits he's not her biological parent. They met Manisha as a child; her biological parents died in a car accident. They adopted her, planning to keep her unmarried to benefit from her status – her biological father had left a will stating his property would go to her husband when she turned 22. Manisha forgives her adoptive parents and marries Vishnu in a grand ceremony.

== Cast ==
- Sree Vishnu as Vishnu "Chinnu"
- Nayan Sarika as Manisha "Junnu"
- Satya as Satya, Vishnu's friend
- Murali Sharma as Guruji, a good astrologer
- Brahmaji as Pankaj, a lecturer
- Praveen as Bilahari, a lecturer
- Satyam Rajesh as Dasu, ABC News reporter
- Srikanth Iyengar as Manisha's adoptive father
- Meena Vasu as Manisha’s adoptive mother
- Vadlamani Srinivas as Manisha’s family lawyer
- Srinivasa Reddy as OC, fake astrologer
- Goparaju Ramana as Bommayya, Vishnu's father
- Pramodini Pammi as Vishnu’s mother
- Tasty Teja as Vishnu’s friend
- Ananth Babu as Vishnu’s marriage alliance’s father
- Balagam Sanjay Krishna as Eveteaser

== Music ==
The background score and songs were composed by Radhan.

All lyrics are written by Ramajogayya Sastry.

Track listing
No.	Title	Singer(s)	Length
1.	"Dekho Vishnu Vinyasam"	Sri Krishna	3:36
2.	"Modhale Modhale"	Madhushree, Naresh Iyer	3:38
3.	"Confusion Confusion"	Sarath Santosh	4:11

== Release and reception ==
Vishnu Vinyasam was released on 27 February 2026.

Sanjana Pulugurtha of The Times of India gave a mixed review, rating it 2.5/5 and felt that the film lacks consistency throughout. Suresh Kavirayani of The New Indian Express too gave the same rating and stated that, "Vishnu Vinyasam works largely because of Sree Vishnu’s comic performance, which he carries on his shoulders. However, a weak storyline, repetitive second-half portions, and an unconvincing climax dilute the overall impact". Janani K of India Today rated it 1.5 out of 5 and opined that "everything goes wrong — the writing, the comedy, the characterisation, and the logic".
