= Rukshar Dhillon =

Indian actress (born (1993)

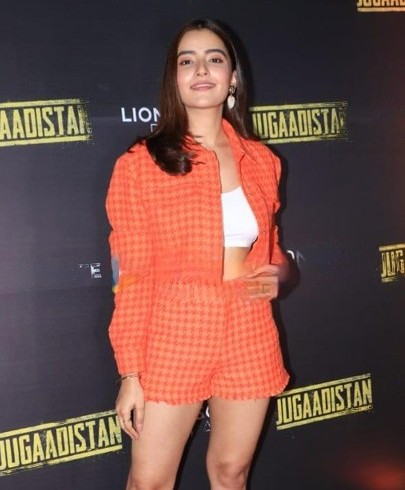
- Dhillon in 2024
- Born: 12 October 1993 (age 33); London, United Kingdom
- Occupation: Actress
- Years active: 2015–present

Rukshar Dhillon (born 12 October 1993) is an Indian actress who primarily works in Telugu films. Dhillon was born in London and raised in India. She made her debut in 2015 with the Kannada film Katte. She went on to star in Telugu films such as Aakatayi, Krishnarjuna Yudham, and ABCD: American Born Confused Desi. In 2020 she appeared in the Hindi film Bhangra Paa Le.

== Early life and career ==
Rukshar Dhillon was born in London and is of Punjabi descent. She was brought up in Goa and her family is now settled in Bangalore. She graduated with a degree in fashion design.

Dhillon began her film career with Om Prakash Rao's Katte before starring in the romantic thriller Run Antony opposite Vinay Rajkumar. The Times of India stated in its review that "Rukshar excels in her role".

In April 2018, she appeared in the Telugu film Krishnarjuna Yudham opposite Nani. The Times of India stated,"Rukshar Dhillon too looks adorable in her role".

She made her Hindi debut with Bhangra Paa Le in 2020. The Times of India stated "Rukshar Dhillon as the big city girl is confidence personified". Filmfare further mentioned "Rukshar does a good job for her first film. She too has killer moves and has a strong screen presence".

== Filmography ==
Key
†	Denotes films that have not yet been released

Year	Film	Role	Language	Note(s)	Ref.
2015	Katte	Shanthi	Kannada	Kannada debut; credited as Vriksha	
2016	Run Antony	Yashu	Kannada		
2017	Aakatayi	Anagha	Telugu	Telugu debut	
2018	Krishnarjuna Yudham	Riya	Telugu		
2019	ABCD: American Born Confused Desi	Neha	Telugu		
2020	Bhangra Paa Le	Simi Kohli	Hindi	Hindi debut	
2022	Ashoka Vanamlo Arjuna Kalyanam	Pasupuleti Madhavi	Telugu		
2022	Jaadugar	Iccha	Hindi		
2023	Road King	Manasa	Kannada		
2023	Spark Life	Ananya	Telugu		
2023	Tufang	Deep	Punjabi	Punjabi debut	
2024	Naa Saami Ranga	Kumari	Telugu		
2025	Dilruba	Anjali	Telugu		
2028	Ooh La La!	TBA	Hindi		
2028	Bura Na Maano Holi Hai	TBA	Hindi		

=== Television ===
Year	Title	Role	Language	Ref.
2022	Jugaadistan	Ruhi Sada	Hindi	
