= Road King (film) =

2023 Indian film

- Theatrical release poster
- Directed by: Randy Kent
- Written by: Patricia Valenzuela Kent
- Produced by: Dilip Kumar H S Indivar Bhatia; Adnan Shaikh
- Starring: Mateen Hussain; Rukshar Dhillon
- Cinematography: Arif Lalani
- Edited by: Sri Crazy Mindz; Randy Kent
- Music by: Andria Maria Kounna
- Release date: 23 June 2023
- Country: India
- Language: Kannada

Road King is a 2023 Indian Kannada-language action, thriller film produced by Dilip Kumar H S and directed by Randy Kent, starring Mateen Hussain and Rukshar Dhillon with an ensemble supporting cast. The film is written by the Patricia Valenzuela Kent. It is the first Indian film to be directed entirely through Skype conferences.

== Premise ==
Arjun, a motorcycle dealer in Bangalore, meets Manasa, an innocent college student who is new in town. As time passes, the realities of life start to kick in and they must face some harsh truths. Will it work out between them?

== Cast ==
- Mateen Hussain as Arjun
- Rukshar Dhillon as Manasa
- Nayana Shetty as Ria
- Leela Mohan
- Rizwan Ulla
- Sumarao

== Production ==
Road King is the first Indian film to be directed over Skype. Hollywood filmmaker Randy Kent was supposed to direct the film in India but was unable to get a visa; lead actor Mateen suggested Kent direct the film over Skype.

== Release ==
The film was released on June 23, 2023.
