= Nayan Sarika =

Indian actress

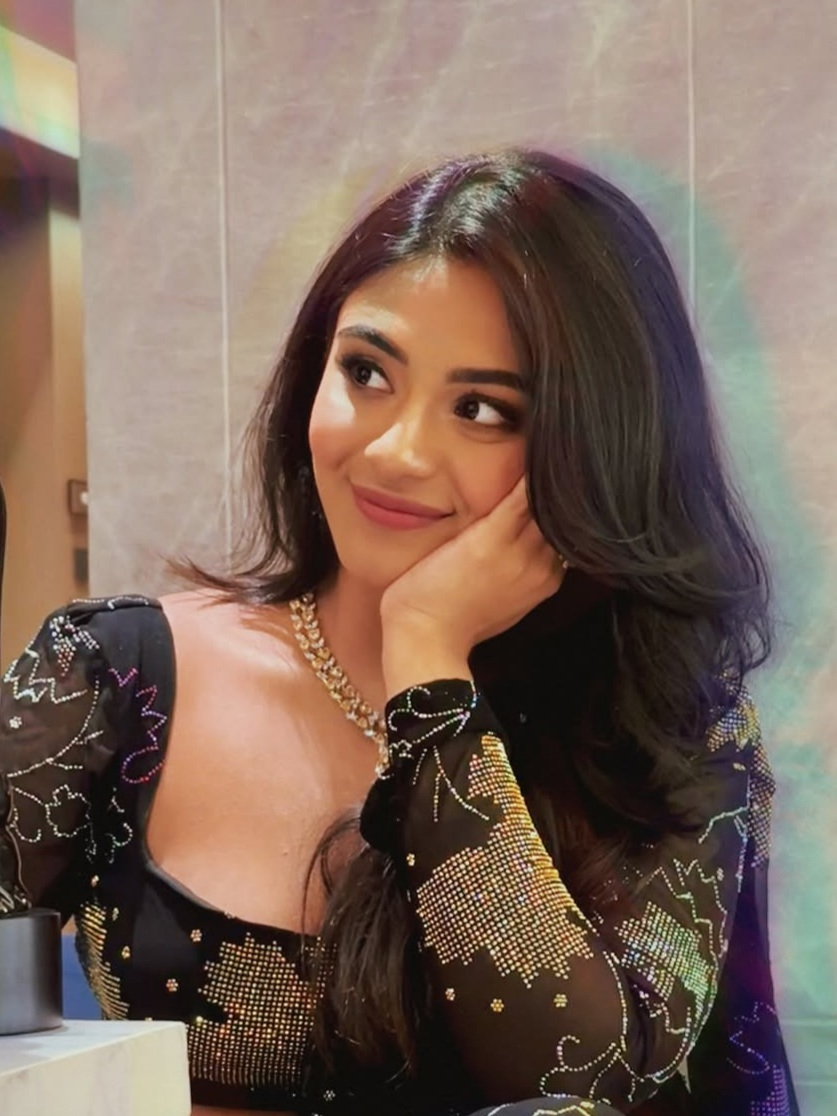
- Sarika in Filmfare 2026
- Born: 23 October; Solapur, Maharashtra
- Citizenship: India
- Occupation: Actress
- Years active: 2023–present
- Notable work: Aay (2024), KA (2024), Vishnu Vinyasam (2026), Raakaasa (2026)
- Awards: Filmfare Award for Best Female Debut (South) - 2026, GAMA Award For Best Debut Actress -2025

Nayan Sarika is an Indian actress, who predominantly works in Telugu films.

== Early life and career ==
Originally from Maharastra, Sarika participated in a photo shoot by a family friend at her aunt's residence, which garnered her offers in the Telugu film industry. For her role in Gam Gam Ganesha (2024), she won the Filmfare Award for Best Female Debut (South). She gained recognition for her role in Aay (2024). She followed it up with KA (2024), which was also successful. She then starred in Vishnu Vinyasam (2026) and Raakaasa (2026). She won the Lucky Charm of Tollywood award at the Zee Telugu Apsara Awards in 2026.

== Filmography ==
Year	Title	Role	Language	Notes	Ref.
2023	Mistake	Parvathy	Telugu		
2024	Chiclets	Riya	Tamil; Telugu	credited as Nayan Karishma; Bilingual film	
2024	Gam Gam Ganesha	Shruthi	Telugu	Filmfare Award for Best Female Debut (South) -2026	
2024	Aay	'Funk' Pallavi	Telugu	GAMA Award For Best Debut Actress - 2025	
2024	KA	Satyabhama	Telugu		
2025	Vrusshabha	Damini	Telugu	Partially reshot in Malayalam	
2026	Vishnu Vinyasam	Manisha "Junnu"	Telugu		
2026	Raakaasa	Subbalakshmi "Subbu"	Telugu		

=== Television ===
Year	Title	Role	Network	Language	Notes
2024	Bench Life	Gayathri	SonyLIV	Telugu	
2024	The Mystery of Moksha Island		Disney+ Hotstar	Telugu	
