= SR Kalyanamandapam =

2021 Telugu film

SR Kalyanamandapam: Est. 1975
- Theatrical release poster
- Directed by: Sridhar Gade
- Screenplay by: Kiran Abbavaram
- Story by: Kiran Abbavaram
- Produced by: Pramod; Raju
- Starring: Kiran Abbavaram; Priyanka Jawalkar; Sai Kumar
- Cinematography: Viswas Daniel
- Edited by: Sridhar Gade
- Music by: Chaitan Bharadwaj
- Production company: Elite Entertainments
- Release date: 6 August 2021
- Running time: 148 minutes
- Country: India
- Language: Telugu
- Box office: est. ₹14.90 crore

SR Kalyanamandapam: Est. 1975 is a 2021 Indian Telugu-language romantic action film directed by Sridhar Gade and written by Kiran Abbavaram. Produced by Elite Entertainments, the film stars Kiran Abbavaram, Priyanka Jawalkar, and Sai Kumar. The music is composed by Chaitan Bharadwaj. The plot is set in Rajampeta, in the Rayalaseema region of Andhra Pradesh. The film is released on 6 August 2021, and was available for streaming on Aha from 28 August.

== Plot ==
A young man Kalyan tries to repair his relationship with his father Dharma while falling in love with his classmate Sindhu. Along with his relationship with his father, he tries to keep up the promise he made to his mother on taking care of the responsibilities of SR Kalyanamandapam. How did he repair his relationship with his father, and succeeded in his love, and bringing SR kalayanamandapam back to light & fame is the rest of the story.

== Cast ==
- Kiran Abbavaram as Kalyan
- Priyanka Jawalkar as Sindhu
- Sai Kumar as Dharma, Kalyan's father
- Tulasi as Santhi, Kalyan's mother
- Tanikella Bharani as college principal
- Srikanth Iyyengar as Paparao, Sindhu's father
- Gangavva as Neighbour
- Sudha as Dharma's sister, and Kalyan's aunt
- Rajsekhar Aningi as Dharma's brother-in-law
- Arun Kumar as Kalyan's friend
- Bharat Rongali as Kalyan's friend
- Kittayya
- Anil Geela as Kalyan's friend
- Godavari Kurrodu Venkat
- Thummala Narsimha Reddy

== Production ==
The film was officially launched in March 2020, at Rayachoti. The plot is set in the Rayalaseema region of Andhra Pradesh. Principal photography of the film was started in early 2020 and continued until March. The filming was then paused due to the COVID-19 pandemic lockdown in India and resumed in October 2020. The film was wrapped in the same month.

== Music ==
SR Kalyanamandapam: Est. 1975

Soundtrack album by Chaitan Bharadwaj
- Recorded: 2020
- Studio: Tweaknob Studios (Hyderabad)
- Genre: Feature film soundtrack
- Language: Telugu
- Label: Lahari Music
- Producer: Chaitan Bharadwaj

Chaitan Bharadwaj chronology
Manmadhudu 2 (2019)	SR Kalyanamandapam: Est. 1975 (2021)	Mahasamudram (2021)

The lyrical version of the first single "Choosale Kallara" was released on 8 September 2020. Second single "Chukkala Chunni" was released on 5 November 2020. Sukumar unveiled the third single "Sigguendukura Mama" on 22 June 2021.

A critic of ABP Desam felt that Bharadwaj's music is main asset of the film. Jeevi of Idlebrain.com too praised the score composition and lauded the Chaitan's work in the first two songs.

Telugu (Original Sound Track)
No.	Title	Lyrics	Singer(s)	Length
1.	"Choosale Kallara"	Krishnakanth	Sid Sriram	3:40
2.	"Chukkala Chunni"	Bhaskarabhatla Ravi Kumar	Anurag Kulkarni	3:35
3.	"Sigguendukura Mama" (Backing Vocals: Chaitan Bharadwaj)	Bhaskarabhatla Ravi Kumar	Anurag Kulkarni	4:25
4.	"Merise Merise" (Backing Vocals: Chaitan Bharadwaj)	Bhaskarabhatla Ravi Kumar	Chaitan Bharadwaj	4:30

== Release ==
In July 2021, it was announced that the film will be releasing on 6 August 2021. The theatrical rights of the film were sold at a cost of ₹ 4.5 crore. The film was released illegally on few torrent websites. The film was premiered on Aha on 28 August 2021.

== Reception ==
=== Critical reception ===
The film generally received mixed reviews. Neeshita Nyayapati of The Times of India gave a rating of 2.5 out of 5, and stated that "SR Kalyana Mandapam attempts to be a breezy tale backed by a novel story but falls into the trappings of every other 90s family or romantic drama." Sangeetha Devi Dundoo of The Hindu wrote: "‘SR Kalyanamandapam’ is overdrawn, melodramatic and misogynistic with a sliver of a story." Sakshi critic Anji Shetty who rated the film 2.5/5 opined that the film had a routine story and poor screenplay. Shetty, however, appreciated the performances of Kiran Abbavaram, Kumar and Jawalkar. Murali Krishna CH of The New Indian Express felt that SR Kalyanamandapam was the kind of film that has been caught in the trappings of a 90s potboiler.

Writing for Film Companion, Mukesh Manjunath praised Kiran Abbavaram's acting and Bharadwaj's music. He stated that "SR Kalyanamandapam Is A Father-Son Drama That Struggles To Make Its Leading Man A Star". The Hans India opined that the film was typical "masala entertainer" filled with comedy tracks, romantic angles, and good emotional sequences. The critic added that the story was a perfect potboiler on paper but the makers failed to translate it well on the screen, giving a rating of 2.5 out of 5. TV9's Dr. Challa Bhagya Lakshmi felt that the film perfectly showcased the relation between a father and a son. A critic of HMTV pointed out that screenplay in the second half as its major weakness, and the climax and performances were its strengths.

=== Box office ===
SR Kalyanamandapam collected a distributors' share of ₹1.5 crore on its first day, and ₹4.38 crore in three days. By the end of the first week, the film grossed over ₹12.31 crore worldwide with distributors earning a share of ₹6.74 crore.
