= Harom Hara =

2024 Telugu film by Gnanasagar Dwaraka

- Theatrical release poster
- Directed by: Gnanasagar Dwaraka
- Written by: Gnanasagar Dwaraka
- Produced by: Sumanth G. Naidu
- Starring: Sudheer Babu; Malvika Sharma; Sunil
- Narrated by: Sunil
- Cinematography: Aravind Viswanathan
- Edited by: Ravi Teja Girijala
- Music by: Chaitan Bharadwaj
- Production company: Sree Subrahmanyeshwara Cinemas
- Distributed by: AD Wise Media Movieflex
- Release date: 14 June 2024
- Running time: 154 minutes
- Country: India
- Language: Telugu
- Box office: ₹5.70 crore

Harom Hara (transl. A Kartikeya chant) is a 2024 Indian Telugu-language action drama film directed by Gnanasagar Dwaraka starring Sudheer Babu, Malvika Sharma and Sunil.

It was released on 14 June 2024 to mixed reviews and ended up becoming an average grosser.

== Cast ==
- Sudheer Babu as Subrahmanyam Reddy
- Malvika Sharma as Devi, Subrahmanyam's love interest and wife
- Sunil as Constable Palani Swami, Subrahmanyam's friend
- Akshara Gowda as ACP Kiranmayi
- Jayaprakash as Shiva Reddy, Subrahmanyam's father
- Ravi Kale as Basava Reddy
- Arjun Gowda as Sharath
- Lakki Lakshman as Thammi Reddy
- Praneeth Hanumanthu as Selva Manikayam Bujjulu

== Soundtrack ==
All music is composed by Chaitan Bharadwaj..

Track listing
No.	Title	Lyrics	Singer(s)	Length
1.	"Harom Harom Hara"	Kalyan Chakravarthy Tripuraneni	Anurag Kulkarni	3:40
2.	"Kanulenduko"	Vengi Sudhakar	Nikhita Srivalli	4:16
3.	"Murugudi Maaya"	Sanapati Bharadwaj Patrudu	Raghu Kunche	2:55
4.	"Naarini Vidichi"	Kalyan Chakravarthy Tripuraneni	Sai Charan	2:59
Total length:				13:50

== Reception ==
A critic from The Times of India rated the film three out of five stars and wrote that "On the whole, Harom Hara is a well attempted period action drama that capitalises on Sudheer Babu's strengths. It offers a decent storyline, strong performances, and impressive technical aspects". A critic from The New Indian Express rated the film two-and-a-half out of five and wrote that "On a whole, Harom Hara struggles to bear the weight of the story it tells and the prototypes that such a story entails, and remains passable at best despite its many promising moments". A critic from Telugucinema.com gave the film the same rating and wrote that "Harom Hara showcases excellent imaging and features solid action sequences. However, it primarily falters in terms of its storytelling, particularly in the second half, which becomes monotonous". A critic from The Indian Express wrote that "despite the good performances, Harom Hara is more pain than pleasure". Sangeetha Devi Dundoo of The Hindu wrote that "How far can this Pushpa-meets-KGF style of narrative work? Until the oversized guns, which have become a cliche, are used in key action sequences.".
