= Vennela Kishore filmography =

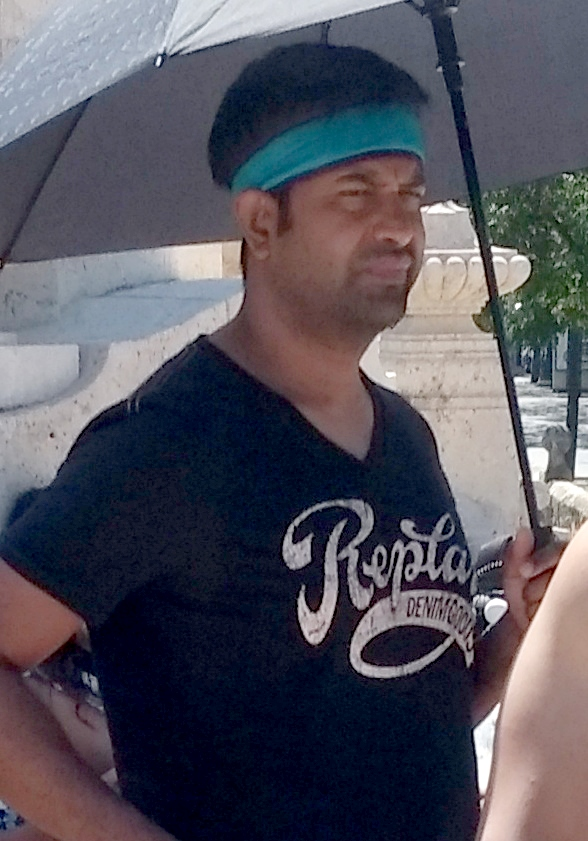
Kishore at a shoot in València, 2016

The following is the filmography of Indian actor Vennela Kishore.

== As an actor ==
Key
†	Denotes films that have not yet been released

- All films are in Telugu language unless otherwise noted

List of films and roles
Year	Title	Role	Notes
2005	Vennela	Khader Basha	
2009	Indumathi	Kishore	
2009	Samardhudu	Nandhini's brother-in-law	
2009	Current	Bose	
2010	Bindaas	Muddu Krishna	
2010	Chalaki	Subba Rao's friend	
2010	Inkosaari	Bala Bokkala	
2010	Prasthanam	Goli	
2010	Sneha Geetham	Box Office Bhushanam	
2010	Orange	Ram's friend	
2010	Yemaindi Ee Vela	Seenu's friend	
2011	Vaareva	Rishi's friend	
2011	Thimmaraju		
2011	Aha Naa Pellanta	Love Guru	
2011	Seema Tapakai	Peda Kishore	
2011	Dookudu	M.S.Sastry	
2011	Madatha Kaja	Kishore	
2011	It's My Love Story	Sujath A. R.	
2011	Pilla Zamindar	Sarkar	
2011	Priyudu	Karthik's friend	
2012	Shiva Manasulo Shruti	Shruti's brother	
2012	Mr. Nookayya	Charger	
2012	Lovely	Kittu	
2012	Racha	Raj’s friend	
2012	Daruvu	Khaja	
2012	Julai	Cafe customer	
2012	Vennela 1½	Khader Basha	Also director
2012	Denikaina Ready	David	
2013	Jaffa	Nikhil	Also director
2013	Jabardasth	Software Subramanyam	
2013	Chammak Challo	Flat resident	
2013	D/O Varma	Rao Gopal Warma	
2013	Abbai Class Ammai Mass	Sri's friend	
2013	Bhai	Home Minister's P.A.	
2013	Sukumarudu		
2013	Doosukeltha	Piccheshwar	
2013	Baadshah	Dasu	
2013	Shadow	Nana Bhai's henchman	
2013	Greeku Veerudu	Subrahmanyam	
2013	Athadu Aame O Scooter	Govind Raju BA. Pass	Lead role
2013	Tadakha	Ganesh	
2013	Biskett	Chittilingam	
2014	Yevadu	Charan's friend	
2014	Pandavulu Pandavulu Thummeda	Gopal	
2014	Malligadu Marriage Bureau	Bobby	
2014	Boy Meets Girl: Tholi Prema Katha	Maha Lakshmi's ex	
2014	Run Raja Run	Mukundham	
2014	Geethanjali	patient of Saitan Raj	
2014	Current Theega	Raju's friend	
2014	Aagadu	Prabhakar	
2014	Govindudu Andarivadele	Bunny	
2014	Janda Pai Kapiraju	Suresh	
2014	Alludu Seenu	Seenu's friend	
2014	Ala Ela	Karthik's friend	
2014	Lakshmi Raave Maa Intiki	Software Subrahmanyam	
2015	Gopala Gopala	Rambabu	
2015	Temper	Vennela Kishore	
2015	Pandaga Chesko	Konda	
2015	S/O Satyamurthy	Viraj's brother	
2015	Kiraak	Professor	
2015	Superstar Kidnap	Vennela Kishore	
2015	Srimanthudu	Apparao	
2015	Bale Bale Magadivoy	Lucky's friend	
2015	Bruce Lee – The Fighter	Uganda Yugendhar	
2016	Dictator	Kathyayani's brother	
2016	Eluka Majaka	Balu	Lead role
2016	Supreme	Constable Kishore	
2016	Kshanam	Babu Khan	
2016	Tuntari	Raju's friend	
2016	Savitri	NRI	
2016	Eedo Rakam Aado Rakam	Kishore	
2016	Brahmotsavam	Lakkavarapu "Lilly" Lingaraju	
2016	Janatha Garage	Pyarelal	Cameo appearance
2016	Gentleman	Sudarshanam	
2016	Manamantha	Bhushan	
2016	Thikka	Jayanth	
2016	Aatadukundam Raa	Karthik's friend	
2016	Majnu	Sanjay Leela Bhansali	
2016	Eedu Gold Ehe	Railway TC	
2016	Nandini Nursing Home	Ganesh	
2016	Ism	Sathya's friend	
2016	Ekkadiki Pothavu Chinnavada	Kishore	
2017	Luckunnodu	C.E.O. of Kony Solutions	
2017	Kittu Unnadu Jagratha	Santhanam's right hand	
2017	Nenu Local	Salesman	
2017	Om Namo Venkatesaya	Govindarajulu's assistant	
2017	Winner	Padma	
2017	Keshava	Ranga	
2017	Rarandoi Veduka Chudham	Kishore	
2017	Ami Thumi	Sri Chilipi	
2017	Duvvada Jagannadham	Akella Vigneshwara Sharma	
2017	Jayadev	Jayadev's brother-in-law	
2017	Goutham Nanda	Kishore	
2017	Anando Brahma	Raju	
2017	Veedevadu	Albert's assistant	
2017	Mahanubhavudu	Kishore	
2017	Raju Gari Gadhi 2	Kishore	
2017	Balakrishnudu	Kishore	
2017	Oxygen	Aakash	
2017	Hello	Bridegroom	Guest appearance in song
2017	Middle Class Abbayi	Kishore	
2018	Agnyaathavaasi	Bala Subramanyam	
2018	Chalo	Revenge Param	
2018	Touch Chesi Chudu	J. Balram	
2018	MLA	Sri Chilipi	
2018	Naa Peru Surya	Kishore	
2018	Jamba Lakidi Pamba	Lawyer Guvvala Swaroop	
2018	Saakshyam	Viswa's friend	
2018	Goodachari	Shaam	
2018	Chi La Sow	Sujith	
2018	Geetha Govindam	Bridegroom	
2018	Neevevaro	Chekka Rao	
2018	Sailaja Reddy Alludu	Chari	
2018	Devadas	Dr. Kuchipudi	
2018	Savyasachi	Kittu	
2018	Amar Akbar Anthony	Miriyala	
2018	Padi Padi Leche Manasu	Gemini Natarajan	
2019	N.T.R: Kathanayakudu	Rukmanandha Rao	
2019	N.T.R: Mahanayakudu	Rukmanandha Rao	
2019	F2 – Fun and Frustration	John Strow	
2019	Crazy Crazy Feeling	Maheshwar Rao	
2019	Chitralahari	Kishore	
2019	Maharshi	Kanna	
2019	Hippi	Harley Davidson (HD)	
2019	ABCD: American Born Confused Desi	Kishore	
2019	Ninu Veedani Needanu Nene	Arjun	
2019	1st Rank Raju	Bollywood Bobby	
2019	Manmadhudu 2	Kishore	
2019	Edaina Jaragocchu	Movie director	Special appearance
2019	Kousalya Krishnamurthy	Inspector Balram	
2019	Kathanam	Creative Kishore (CK)	
2019	Saaho	Goswami	Bilingual film (Hindi and Telugu)
2019	Gang Leader	Santoor Senakkayala	
2019	Tenali Ramakrishna BA. BL	Kishore	
2019	Arjun Suravaram	Addala Balaji	
2019	Tholu Bommalata	Santosh	
2019	Mathu Vadalara	Ravi	
2019	Bhagyanagara Veedullo Gamattu	Police Officer	Also co-producer
2019	Dhrusti	Adavi Sesh	
2020	Ala Vaikunthapurramuloo	Shrinivas	
2020	Sarileru Neekevvaru	Kishore	
2020	Entha Manchivaadavuraa	Kishore	
2020	Disco Raja	Palguni	
2020	Jaanu	Murali	
2020	Bheeshma	Parimal	
2020	V	Mansoor	
2020	Solo Brathuke So Better	Govind Gowda	
2021	Red	Purushottam	
2021	Alludu Adhurs	Pandu	
2021	Bangaru Bullodu	Mahalakshmi's fiancé	
2021	Kapatadhaari	Gowtham's colleague	
2021	Jathi Ratnalu	Chanchalguda Santosh	
2021	Sashi	Fathima’s love interest	
2021	Rang De	Shastri	
2021	Ichata Vahanamulu Niluparadu	Sukku	
2021	Gully Rowdy	Nemali Babu	
2021	Annabelle Sethupathi	Christian train passenger	Tamil film
2021	Most Eligible Bachelor	Shankar	
2021	Pelli SandaD	Chintu	
2021	Varudu Kaavalenu	Kishore	
2021	Manchi Rojulochaie	Doctor Bava	
2022	Bangarraju	Chinna Bangarraju's uncle	
2022	Hero	Telemarketing guy	
2022	Khiladi	Bobby	
2022	Malli Modalaindi	Kishore	
2022	Son of India	Kishore	
2022	Aadavallu Meeku Johaarlu	Phani	
2022	Stand Up Rahul	Steve Jags	
2022	F3	Junior Artist	
2022	Ashoka Vanamlo Arjuna Kalyanam	MLA Rajaram	
2022	Acharya	Acharya's disciple	
2022	Sarkaru Vaari Paata	Kishore	
2022	Gangster Gangaraju	Bachan Takhur	
2022	Bimbisara	Prasadam	
2022	Happy Birthday	Union minister Rithwik Sodhi	
2022	Sita Ramam	Durjoy Sharma	
2022	First Day First Show	Ravi anna	
2022	Aa Ammayi Gurinchi Meeku Cheppali	Bose	
2022	Oke Oka Jeevitham	Seenu	
2022	Swathi Muthyam	Dr. Bucchi Babu	
2022	Krishna Vrinda Vihari	Dr. Satya	
2022	Ginna	Mysore Bujji	
2022	Itlu Maredumilli Prajaneekam	English teacher	
2022	Urvasivo Rakshasivo	Satish	
2022	Macherla Niyojakavargam	Guru	
2023	Waltair Veerayya	Seethapati’s brother-in-law	
2023	Mr. King	Uma Devi’s fiance	
2023	Sathi Gani Rendu Ekaralu	Bike Rider	
2023	Ramabanam	Savitri	
2023	Custody	Prem	Telugu version only
2023	Bhuvana Vijayam	Mute writer	
2023	Anni Manchi Sakunamule	Prasad’s son-in-law	
2023	Samajavaragamana	Kula Shekar	
2023	Bro	Mark's boss	
2023	Bhola Shankar	Vamshi	
2023	Nene Naa	Bobbili Raja	
2023	Kushi	Pitobash	
2023	Rules Ranjann	Kamesh	
2023	Prema Vimanam	School Teacher	
2023	Spark Life	Rama Brahmam	
2023	Sound Party	—N/a	Voiceover
2023	Breathe		
2024	Guntur Kaaram	Balasubramanyam "Balu"	
2024	Hanu Man	Siri Vennela	
2024	Ooru Peru Bhairavakona	Doctor Narappa	
2024	Chaari 111	Agent Chaari	Lead role
2024	Bhimaa	Sathish	
2024	The Family Star	Samarth	
2024	Baak	Mason	Partially reshot version of Aranmanai 4
2024	OMG: O Manchi Ghost	Aatma	
2024	Usha Parinayam	Appadala Anvesh	
2024	Dhoom Dhaam	Suhas	
2024	Mathu Vadalara 2	Yuva / Ravi Teja	
2024	Srikakulam Sherlock Holmes	Om / Sherlock Holmes	
2024	Manamey	Doctor	
2025	Game Changer	Eveteaser	
2025	Ramam Raghavam	Satyam	
2025	Brahma Anandam	Giri	
2025	14 Days Girlfriend Intlo	Creator Kiss	
2025	Akkada Ammayi Ikkada Abbayi	Krishna’s brother-in-law	
2025	Sarangapani Jathakam	Chandrasekhar "Chandu"	
2025	Single	Aravind	
2025	Bhairavam	Sundarachari	
2025	Hari Hara Veera Mallu		
2025	Mithra Mandali	SI Sagar Chandra	
2025	K-Ramp	Bunty	
2025	Santhana Prapthirasthu	Dr. Bhramaram	Also sang "Anukundhokati Le Ayyindhokati Le"
2025	Premante	SI Sampath	
2025	Champion	Joseph	
2026	Bhartha Mahasayulaku Wignyapthi	Leela	
2026	Nari Nari Naduma Murari	Lawyer Gunashekhar	
2026	Hey Balwanth	Yuvan	
2026	Raakaasa	Somu	
2026	Bad Boy Karthik	Sidappa	
2026	Jetlee	Satya	
2026	Maa Inti Bangaaram	Kiranmayi's husband	Cameo appearance
2026	Mahendragiri Vaarahi	Satyam	
2026	Rambha Urvasi Menaka	Indra	
2026	Comrade Kalyan	ACP Pradyuman	

== As a director ==
List of films directed
Year	Title	Ref.
2012	Vennela 1½	
2013	Jaffa	
