= Robinhood (2025 film) =

Indian action comedy film by Venky Kudumula

- Theatrical release poster
- Directed by: Venky Kudumula
- Written by: Venky Kudumula
- Produced by: Naveen Yerneni; Yalamanchili Ravi Shankar
- Starring: Nithiin; Sreeleela
- Cinematography: Sai Sriram
- Edited by: Koti
- Music by: G. V. Prakash Kumar
- Production company: Mythri Movie Makers
- Release date: 28 March 2025
- Running time: 156 minutes
- Country: India
- Language: Telugu
- Budget: ₹60 crore

Robinhood is a 2025 Indian Telugu-language heist action comedy film written and directed by Venky Kudumula and produced by Mythri Movie Makers. The film stars Nithiin in the titular role and Sreeleela, alongside Vennela Kishore, Rajendra Prasad, Devdatta Nage and Shine Tom Chacko. The soundtrack and background score were composed by G. V. Prakash Kumar, while the cinematography and editing was handled by Sai Sriram and Koti.

Robinhood was set to theatrically release on 25 December 2024, coinciding with Christmas, but was postponed for undisclosed reasons. The film was later released on 28 March 2025 to mixed reviews and became a box office bomb.

== Plot ==
Ram, an orphan inspired by a school pledge, grows up believing the entire country is his family. As a child, he begins stealing from the rich to fund struggling orphanages. Years later, the police finally begins tracking the elusive thief known as "Robinhood." Meanwhile, Neera, the daughter of wealthy Australian CEO Vasudev, travels to India to reconnect with her roots. Her father, fearing for her safety, hires a security firm found via a Google search. Unbeknownst to them, it is a rundown outfit in Hyderabad run by Janardhan Sunnipetah a.k.a John Snow. Ram, coincidentally, joins the same firm.

Neera visits a village where her grandfather helps the locals. The village is under threat from Swamy, a drug dealer who wants to use the land for drug cultivation. When Neera learns that Swamy's men injured her grandfather and are terrorizing the villagers, she and Ram attempt to rally the villagers, who are too afraid to resist. Ram pretends to side with Swamy to gain access to his operations, hacking Swamy's phone to plant fake evidence. However, Swamy discovers the ruse and captures Ram.

When Ram is captured, Neera's grandfather is also there, and Swamy's goons threaten to kill him. Ram, under the influence of drugs, thrashes them all. It is revealed that when Ram was a child, Neera's grandfather saw him giving his money to an old lady even though Ram was also a poor orphan. The grandfather is touched by this and admits him into a great orphanage that he donates money to. Soon, Ram learns about Robinhood and his actions when the grandfather is injured and cannot send money to the orphanage anymore. He discovers why the donations are not coming and realizes that people are misusing orphanage donations just for fame. This is when Ram starts to steal from greedy people. Ram wakes from his drug state and learns that fellow orphans posing as security guards rescue Neera's family.

One last time, Ram goes to Swamy's hideout and battles him but it is interrupted by Victor Varghese, a police officer who has been searching for Robinhood from the start. When Ram hacked Swamy's phone, Victor was monitoring transactions, and just as Ram's name came up for the person getting money, Ram's hacker friend changed the image of Ram to Swamy, leading to Swamy's arrest, while Victor wonders how Ram found "Robinhood" first. During one of Robinhood's heists, Ram failed to escape without Victor noticing him. Before this, Ram made a police report about Robinhood stealing his father's money so that if he is caught, it would be under the fact that he was searching for Robinhood.

The film ends with Swamy imprisoned beside drug kingpin David Bhai, who cryptically blames his arrest on "Robinhood"—not Ram, but part of a growing movement. The final shot hints at a sequel, Brotherhood Robinhood, featuring multiple orphans also learning about Robinhood. This inspired them to also become Robinhoods.

== Cast ==
- Nithiin as Ram / Robinhood
- Sreeleela as Neera Vasudev
- Devdatta Nage as Saamy
- Shine Tom Chacko as Victor Varghese
- Rajendra Prasad as John Snow / Janardhan Sunnipetah
- Brahmanandam as Satyanarayana
- Vennela Kishore as Jyothi
- Giri Babu as Rama Chandra Murthy, Ram's father
- Chandra Mohan as Chandram, Robinhood's father
- Janaki Sabesh as Geetha, Ram's mother
- Suhasini Maniratnam as Snehalatha, Robinhood's mother
- Sudha as Lakshmi, Neera's mother
- Shiju as Vasudev, Neera's father
- Annapurna as Rajyalakshmi, Ram's adopted grandmother and Neera's grandmother
- Lal as Rajat, Ram's adopted grandfather and Neera's grandfather
- Brahmaji as Subba Rao
- Mime Gopi as Varada
- Aadukalam Naren as Minister
- Subhalekha Sudhakar as Orphanage Owner
- Mathew Varghese as Inspector Sushil Kumar
- Kyle Paul as Alex
- Dayanand Reddy

Cameo appearance

Diksha Panth as Marwari wife

- David Warner as David Bhai
- Ketika Sharma as item number in the song "Adhi Dha Surprisu"

== Production ==
After the success of Bheeshma (2020), Venky Kudumula announced his next project on 22 March 2023 under the tentative titled as VNRTrio, as it was the second collaboration of Venky Kudumula, Nithiin and Rashmika Mandanna. The film was officially titled as Robinhood announced on 26 January 2024, coinciding with Republic Day. However, Rashmika opted out of the film due to date issues. Later Raashi Khanna was considered to play the female lead, before the makers finalized Sreeleela for the role, in her second collaboration with Nithiin after Extra Ordinary Man (2023). Australian cricketer David Warner makes his acting debut in a cameo and Ketika Sharma appears in an Item number.

Principal photography commenced in Hyderabad and continued in Munnar and Melbourne, Australia. Filming wrapped up in December 2024.

== Music ==
Robinhood

Soundtrack album by G. V. Prakash Kumar
- Genre: Feature film soundtrack
- Language: Telugu
- Label: Sony Music India

G. V. Prakash Kumar chronology
Veera Dheera Sooran (2025)	Robinhood (2025)	Good Bad Ugly (2025)

Singles from Robinhood
- 1. "One More Time" Released: 26 November 2024; 2. "Wherever You Go" Released: 14 February 2025; 3. "Adhi Dha Surprisu" Released: 10 March 2025

The music was composed by G. V. Prakash Kumar. The audio rights for the film were acquired by Sony Music India.

The first single titled "One More Time" was released on 26 November 2024. The second single titled "Wherever You Go" was released on 14 February 2025. The third single, titled "Adhi Dha Surprisu" was released on 10 March 2025.

Track listing
No.	Title	Lyrics	Singer(s)	Length
1.	"One More Time"	Krishna Kanth	G. V. Prakash Kumar, Vidya Vox	3:10
2.	"Wherever You Go"	Krishna Kanth	Armaan Malik	3:07
3.	"Adhi Dha Surprisu"	Chandrabose	Neeti Mohan, Anurag Kulkarni	3:49

== Release ==
=== Theatrical ===
Robinhood was set to theatrically release on 25 December 2024, coinciding with Christmas, but was postponed for undisclosed reasons. The film was later released on 28 March 2025.

=== Home media ===
The film released on OTT platform in ZEE5 on May 10, 2025, from 6pm.

== Reception ==
=== Critical reception ===
Sashidhar Adivi of Times Now rated the film 2/5 stars andopined that the writing of Venky Kudumula "couldn’t get to the bottom of the characters gravity", while comparing with strong writing in Chalo (2018) and Bheeshma (2020). BH Harsh of The New Indian Express cited it as "an utterly listless and forgettable film". Calling it a "misfire", Srivathsan Nadadhur of The Hindu was critical of the writing and execution of the film. In his review of the film, Avinash Ramachandran of The Indian Express rated the film 2/5 stars and stated that "the biggest problem with Robinhood is that it merely goes through its motions".

=== Box office ===
Robinhood had a modest start at the box office. On its opening day (28 March 2025), it grossed approximately ₹4.8 crore worldwide, with around ₹1 crore collected in the Telugu-speaking states of Andhra Pradesh and Telangana; the remainder came from other Indian regions and overseas markets.

The film was widely regarded as a box office bomb, grossing only a fraction of its reported ₹55–60 crore production budget. Industry analysts noted that weak word‑of‑mouth and stiff competition from other releases, including Mad Square, significantly hampered its performance.
