= Krishna Vrinda Vihari =

2022 film by Anish R. Krishna

- Theatrical release poster
- Directed by: Anish R Krishna
- Written by: Anish R Krishna
- Produced by: Usha Mulpuri
- Starring: Naga Shaurya; Shirley Setia
- Cinematography: Sai Sriram
- Edited by: Tammiraju
- Music by: Mahati Swara Sagar
- Production company: Ira Creations
- Release date: 23 September 2022
- Running time: 139 minutes
- Country: India
- Language: Telugu
- Box office: est. ₹8.90 crore

Krishna Vrinda Vihari is a 2022 Indian Telugu-language romantic comedy film directed by Anish R. Krishna and produced by Usha Mulpuri under the banner of Ira Creations. The film stars Naga Shaurya and Shirley Setia. After being postponed multiple times, the film was finally released on 23 September 2022.

== Plot ==
Krishna Chari (Naga Shaurya), a young man born into a restrictive Brahmin family, gets a software job in Hyderabad. The moment he sees Vrinda (Shirley Setia) in his office, he falls for her. However, she is quite stubborn and does not accept his love due to an issue. After Krishna pursues her for some time, she tells him that she cannot bear children due to a defect. However, Krishna understands her situation and accepts her as is. Finally, he wins her over but is still unsure how to convince his orthodox family to support their union. After a while, he somehow manages to persuade them by playing a trick and marries Vrinda. This lands him in big trouble. What is this trouble? How did Krishna manage it? That forms the story.

== Cast ==
- Naga Shaurya as Krishna Chari
- Shirley Setia as Vrinda Mishra
- Amitash Pradhan as Nandan, Manager
- Rahul Ramakrishna as Krishna's colleague
- Satya as Giri, Krishna's colleague
- Vennela Kishore as Dr. Satya
- Radhika Sarathkumar as Amruthavalli Chari, Krishna's mother
- Brahmaji as Krishna's brother-in-law
- Jayaprakash as Varahachari, Krishna's father
- Annapurna as Krishna's paternal grandmother
- Sharanya Pradeep as Saindhavi Chari, Krishna's sister

== Production ==
The film was officially announced on 16 October 2020. The film was formally launched on 28 October 2020. The film was tentatively titled as NS22 and IRA4. On 22 January 2022, the film's official title was unveiled as Krishna Vrinda Vihari. Principal photography of the film began on 9 December 2020.

== Music ==
Krishna Vrinda Vihari

Soundtrack album by Mahati Swara Sagar
- Released: 9 April 2022
- Recorded: 2021–2022
- Genre: Feature film soundtrack
- Language: Telugu
- Label: Saregama
- Producer: Mahati Swara Sagar

Mahati Swara Sagar chronology
Macherla Niyojakavargam (2022)	Krishna Vrinda Vihari (2022)	Swathi Muthyam (2022)

Singles from Krishna Vrinda Vihari
- 1. "Varshamlo Vennella" Released: 9 April 2022; 2. "Emundi Ra" Released: 4 May 2022

The music composed by Mahati Swara Sagar collaborating with Naga Shourya for the fourth time after Jadoogadu, Nartanasala and Chalo. The audio rights were bagged by Saregama. The first single titled "Varshamllo Vennella" was sung by Adtiya RK and Sanjana Kalmanje and it was released on 9 April 2022.

The second single titled "Emundi Ra" was sung by "Haricharan" and it is released on 4 May 2022.

All music is composed by Mahati Swara Sagar.

Track listing
No.	Title	Lyrics	Singer(s)	Length
1.	"Varshamllo Vennella"	Shree Mani	Adithya RK, Sanjana Kalmanje	3:46
2.	"Emundi Ra"	Sri Harsha Emani	Haricharan	4:05
3.	"Tara Tara"	Shree Mani	Nakash Aziz	3:15
4.	"Krishna Vrinda Vihari - Title Song"	Kasarla Shyam	Ram Miryala, Dhanunjey	3:13

== Release ==
Krishna Vrinda Vihari was released on 23 September 2022. Earlier, the film was scheduled to be released in theatres on 22 April 2022. It was pushed back to 20 May and later 24 June 2022 but was not released.

== Reception ==
Neeshita Nyayapati of The Times of India rated the film 2 out of 5 stars and wrote "Krishna Vrinda Vihari needed better writing and direction for it to work, because it relies a little too much on the shoddily written light-hearted moments to pull it through".
