= Macherla Niyojakavargam =

2022 film directed by MS Raja Shekhar Reddy

- Theatrical release poster
- Directed by: M. S. Rajashekhar Reddy
- Written by: M. S. Rajashekhar Reddy
- Produced by: N. Sudhakar Reddy; N. Nikitha Reddy
- Starring: Nithin; Krithi Shetty; Catherine Tresa
- Cinematography: Prasad Murella
- Edited by: Kotagiri Venkateswara Rao
- Music by: Mahati Swara Sagar
- Production company: Sreshth Movies
- Release date: 12 August 2022
- Running time: 159 minutes
- Country: India
- Language: Telugu
- Box office: ₹15.75 crore

Macherla Niyojakavargam (transl. Macherla constituency) is a 2022 Indian Telugu-language political action comedy film written and directed by editor M. S. Rajashekhar Reddy in his directorial debut. The film stars Nithin, Krithi Shetty, and Catherine Tresa, while Samuthirakani, Rajendra Prasad, Murali Sharma, Vennela Kishore, and Subhalekha Sudhakar play supporting roles. It was produced by Nithiin's family under Sreshth Movies.

The music was composed by Mahati Swara Sagar with cinematography by Prasad Murella and editing by Kotagiri Venkateswara Rao. The film released on 12 August 2022 to negative reviews from critics and became a box-office disappointment.

== Plot ==
Siddharth Reddy is a happy guy who gets posted as the DC for Palnadu district to conduct elections peacefully, but faces opposition from Rajappa, a corrupt politician who terrorizes the people in the district. Siddharth learns that his love interest Swathi wanted to exact vengeance on Rajappa as her brother, who was the former DC, was killed when he contested against Rajappa. After learning this, Siddharth challenges Rajappa that the election will be held peacefully and Swathi's grandfather Raghavaiah contests in the elections. A cat-and-mouse game ensues between Siddharth and Rajappa, where Raghavaiah wins the election and Siddharth ends Rajappa's fear in the district, killing Rajappa's son Veera thus leading Rajappa to commit suicide. Later Siddharth reunites with Swathi and marries her happily.

== Cast ==
- Nithin as N. Siddharth 'Siddhu' Reddy IAS
- Krithi Shetty as Swathi, Siddhu's love interest
- Catherine Tresa as Nidhi
- Samuthirakani as MLA Rajappa and Veera (dual role)
- Rajendra Prasad as Surendra, Swathi’s father
- Vennela Kishore as Guru, Swathi’s brother-in-law
- Murali Sharma as Narendra Reddy, Siddhu’s father
- Jayaprakash as Chief Minister of Andhra Pradesh
- Indraja as Siddhu’s mother
- Subhalekha Sudhakar as Raghavaiah, Swathi’s grandfather
- Brahmaji as Narayana, MRO of Macherla
- Rajitha as Swathi’s mother
- Duvvasi Mohan as Chief Minister’s assistant
- Sirisha Sougandh as Nidhi’s mother
- Shyamala as Guru’s wife
- Vadlamani Srinivas as Vizag Police Constable
- Anjali (cameo appearance in the song "Ra Ra Reddy I'm Ready")

== Production ==
On 10 September 2021, Sreshth Movies made an announcement, on the occasion of Vinayak Chaturthi, with a puja ceremony of their upcoming movie with Nithiin. It is produced under the banner of Sreshth Movies in association with Aditya Movies & Entertainments. Principal photography commenced in September 2021.

== Music ==
Macherla Niyojakavargam

Soundtrack album by Mahati Swara Sagar
- Released: 2022
- Recorded: 2021–2022
- Genre: Feature film soundtrack
- Language: Telugu
- Label: Aditya Music
- Producer: Mahathi Swara Sagar

Mahati Swara Sagar chronology
Kinnerasani (2022)	Macherla Niyojakavargam (2022)	Krishna Vrinda Vihari (2022)

Singles from Macherla Niyojakavargam
- 1. "Chill Maaro" Released: 31 May 2022; 2. "Ra Ra Reddy" Released: 9 July 2022; 3. "Adirindey" Released: 23 July 2022; 4. "Pori Superoo" Released: 6 August 2022

The music is composed by Mahati Swara Sagar, his third collaboration with Nithiin, after Bheeshma and Maestro. The audio is distributed by Aditya Music.

The first single titled "Chill Maro" was sung by Nakash Aziz, Sanjana Kalmanje and it was released on 31 May 2022. The second single titled "Ra Ra Reddy I'm Ready" was released on 9 July 2022. A part of the song "Ranu Ranu Antundi Chinnadho" from Nithiin's first film Jayam too was recreated within the song.

All music is composed by Mahati Swara Sagar.

Tracklist
No.	Title	Lyrics	Singer(s)	Length
1.	"Chill Maaro"	Krishna Chaitanya	Nakash Aziz, Sanjana Kalmanje	3:44
2.	"Ra Ra Reddy I'm Ready"	Kasarla Shyam, Kulasekar	Lipsika, Aditya Iyengar	4:38
3.	"Adirindey"	Krishna Kanth	Sanjith Hegde	3:38
4.	"Pori Superoo"	Krishna Kanth	Rahul Sipligunj, Geetha Madhuri	2:14

== Release ==
The film was released in theatres on 12 August 2022. It opened to negative reviews from critics and collected 15.75 crores in India, and 69K in the US. The film was a box office disappointment despite high buzz. The post-theatrical streaming rights of the film were acquired by ZEE5 and premiered on 9 December 2022. The film's satellite rights were brought by Zee Telugu and it will premiere soon.

The Hindi dubbed version titled MCK: Macherla Chunav Kshetra was directly premiered on Sony Max on 11 December 2022.

== Reception ==
=== Critical reception ===
Macherla Niyojakavargam received mixed to negative reviews. Arvind V of Pinkvilla rated the film 2 out of 5 stars and wrote "The story of Macherla Niyojakavargam checks all the wrong boxes, boxes that have been reintroduced from a bygone era: Threatening a widow". 123Telugu wrote that the film is "routine and outdated action drama with a select few mass moments". Neeshitha Nyayapati of The Times of India rated the film 1.5 out of 5 stars and wrote "Macherla Niyojakavargam is sadly all style and no substance". Murali Krishna CH of The New Indian Express stated "Macherla Niyojakavargam is painfully predictable and ridiculously repetitive".

=== Box office ===
Macherla Niyojakavargam recorded a gross of ₹8.6 crore on its opening day with a share of ₹5.17 crore. In its opening weekend, it collected a total gross of ₹14.2 crore with a share of ₹8.1 crore.
