= Bhola Shankar =

2023 Indian film by Meher Ramesh

- Theatrical release poster
- Directed by: Meher Ramesh
- Screenplay by: Meher Ramesh
- Dialogues by: Mamidala Thirupathi
- Story by: Siva; Adi Narayana
- Based on: Vedalam (Tamil)
- Produced by: Anil Sunkara; Ramabrahmam Sunkara
- Starring: Chiranjeevi; Tamannaah Bhatia; Keerthy Suresh; Sushanth
- Cinematography: Dudley
- Edited by: Marthand K. Venkatesh
- Music by: Mahati Swara Sagar
- Production company: AK Entertainments
- Distributed by: Zee Studios
- Release date: 11 August 2023
- Running time: 160 minutes
- Country: India
- Language: Telugu
- Budget: ₹100 crore
- Box office: est.₹42.2 crore

Bhola Shankar is a 2023 Indian Telugu-language action comedy film directed by Meher Ramesh. It stars Chiranjeevi in the title role with Tamannaah Bhatia, Keerthy Suresh and Sushanth. It is an official remake of the 2015 Tamil film Vedalam.

Released on 11 August 2023, Bhola Shankar was critically panned and underperformed at the box office, earning about ₹42.2 crore against a budget of ₹100 crore.

Chiranjeevi was dubbed by Jackie Shroff in Hindi dubbed version of the film.

== Plot ==
In Kolkata, Alexander, the head of a criminal syndicate, operates an extensive trafficking ring involving the kidnapping and sale of girls. Utilizing his brothers Bretlee and Charles, a corrupt port official, and a police informer, Alexander traffics the girls to international buyers. When a CBI officer conducts a raid at the port, Alexander murders him to evade capture.

Shankar and his sister, Mahalakshmi "Maha," relocate to Kolkata where Shankar quickly earns local admiration by rescuing children from an electrical accident. He secures a job with a taxi company owned by Vamsi and enrolls Mahalakshmi in an arts college. Shankar's first passenger is Lasya, a struggling lawyer desperate for a career breakthrough. Lasya persuades Shankar to act as a mute witness in her case. The plan initially appears successful until the judge overhears Shankar speaking to Mahalakshmi, resulting in Lasya's suspension from practice. Seeking revenge, Lasya confronts Shankar but is thwarted by Vamsi, who defends Shankar. Later, they go to a club Shankar exposes Vamsi's infidelity to his wife, leading to Vamsi's loss of his company.

The Kolkata DCP requests Shankar and other transportation workers to report any suspicious activities related to Alexander's syndicate. Shankar identifies several of Alexander's men from a list provided by the DCP. This leads to a successful raid that rescues three girls from trafficking. In response, Bretlee orders Shankar's assassination. Shankar fights off and kills Bretlee and his men, discovering that the police informer had sent his photo to Alexander's gang. Shankar then stores the gun used in a locked drawer filled with weapons.

Shankar picks up Srikar from the airport, who is immediately attracted to Mahalakshmi. Srikar, who is Lasya's brother, reveals that his marriage to Mahalakshmi is being arranged. Despite Mahalakshmi's initial rejection, Shankar encourages Srikar to be honest about his feelings. The engagement between Mahalakshmi and Srikar proceeds, and Shankar and Lasya meet at the ceremony. Lasya attempts to disrupt the event but is ignored. In response, Lasya teams up with Vamsi to further her revenge. She tricks Shankar into thinking Mahalakshmi has been kidnapped, but this was a ruse. Lasya's actions eventually lead her to fall in love with Shankar.

Meanwhile, Charles, Alexander's brother, arrives in Kolkata to investigate his siblings’ deaths. Using footage from a nearby cruise ship, Charles traces Shankar. While Mahalakshmi and Srikar are out shopping, Charles locates Shankar but is confronted and killed. Lasya witnesses Charles’ death and declares that she cannot allow her brother to marry a killer's sister. Shankar clarifies that Mahalakshmi is not his biological sister and tells her his past.

Past: Shankar, known as Bhola, was a ruthless thug in Hyderabad. After being stabbed by enemies, Shankar is saved by Mahalakshmi. Later, Mahalakshmi and her friend seek Bhola's help when a builder threatens her family. Shankar exploits Mahalakshmi's family. Shankar rescues Mahalakshmi from Alexander's gang, who had kidnapped her. Shankar becomes moved by their affection and decides to protect them as his own family. However it is reveled that Mahalakshmi stole some evidence. Alexander's gang kills Maha's family and injure her. Mahalakshmi loses her memory from the injuries, and Shankar decides to protect her as his own sister.

Present: Shankar reveals to Lasya that his motive for coming to Kolkata was to eliminate Alexander and his gang. He agreed to Mahalakshmi's marriage to ensure her safety if he were killed. Lasya promises to proceed with the wedding. Alexander arrives in Kolkata seeking vengeance for his brothers’ deaths. He kills a port officer who refuses to aid him and uses a police informer to locate Shankar. When Mahalakshmi unknowingly sketches Shankar's face, she tries to mislead Alexander but is saved by Shankar. Alexander's men confront Shankar, but the police informer threatens Alexander. Later, Alexander kills the informer, and Shankar warns Alexander of future consequences. During a shopping trip, Alexander taunts Shankar by threatening to kidnap Mahalakshmi. When Mahalakshmi goes missing, Shankar discovers her in Alexander's warehouse. Alexander manipulates Shankar into believing Mahalakshmi is dead, but Shankar finds her alive in his car. Mahalakshmi, regaining her memory, helps Shankar locate and rescue her. During a final confrontation at the port, Shankar defeats Alexander's men and kills Alexander with a trident, fulfilling his quest for revenge. The film concludes with the DCP announcing that all details of Alexander's syndicate have been exposed, and all trafficked girls have been safely returned to their homes.

== Cast ==
- Chiranjeevi as Bhola Shankar "Shankar", a taxi driver and brother of Mahalakshmi
- Tamannaah Bhatia as Ex-Adv. Lasya, Shankar's love interest and Srikar’s sister
- Keerthy Suresh as Mahalakshmi "Maha", Shankar's sister
- Sushanth as Pilot Sujoy Sarkar, Lasya's brother and Mahalakshmi’s love interest
- Tarun Arora as Alexander
- Murali Sharma as Mahalakshmi’s father
- Sayaji Shinde as police commissioner
- P. Ravi Shankar as local goon
- Subbaraju as special officer
- Shawar Ali as Charles (Alexander's brother)
- Vennela Kishore as Vamsi, a taxi owner
- Brahmaji as corrupt police officer
- Raja Ravindra as corrupt police officer
- Raghu Babu as house owner
- Tulasi as Mahalakshmi’s mother
- Sreemukhi as Mahalaxmi's friend
- Bithiri Sathi as Shankar’s friend
- Satya as Shankar’s friend
- Venu Yeldandi as Shankar’s friend
- Thagubothu Ramesh as Shankar’s friend
- Getup Srinu as house owner’s brother-in-law
- Surekha Vani as house owner’s wife
- Hyper Aadi as Junior 1, Lasya’s assistant
- Harsha Chemudu as Junior 2, Lasya’s assistant
- Uttej as police officer
- Kasi Viswanath as Lasya and Sreekar’s father
- Sithara as Lasya and Sreekar’s mother
- Anee Master as Vamsi’s wife
- Pradeep Kondiparthi as Vamsi’s father-in-law
- Sunaina
- Harika Koyilamma

Cameo appearance

- Brahmanandam as a judge
- Rashmi Gautam in the song "Bholaa Mania"
- Ragini Dwivedi in the song "Bholaa Mania"

== Production ==
Initially, Sai Pallavi was approached for Chiranjeevi's sister's role in the film but she rejected the offer as she was not interested in remakes. Keerthy Suresh was cast in her place. Music director Mani Sharma's son Mahati Swara Sagar was signed onto this film as the composer. Tamannaah Bhatia is cast opposite Chiranjeevi in their second collaboration after Sye Raa Narasimha Reddy (2019). An official launch was held on 11 November 2021. They started filming on 15 November 2021 and finished in May 2023.

== Music ==
Bholaa Shankar

Soundtrack album by Mahati Swara Sagar
- Released: 2023
- Genre: Film soundtrack
- Length: 18:12
- Language: Telugu
- Label: Aditya Music

Mahati Swara Sagar chronology
Paayum Oli Nee Yenakku (2023)	Bholaa Shankar (2023)	Prathinidhi 2 (2024)
External audio
- Bholaa Shankar(Official Audio Jukebox) on YouTube

Singles from Bhola Shankar
- 1. "Bholaa Mania" Released: 4 June 2023; 2. "Jam Jam Jajjanaka" Released: 11 July 2023; 3. "Milky Beauty" Released: 21 July 2023; 4. "Rage of Bhola" Released: 5 August 2023; 5. "Kottara Kottu Teenumaaru" Released: 7 August 2023

The music is composed by Mahati Swara Sagar. Lyrics are written by Ramajogayya Sastry, Sri Mani, and Kasarala Shyam. The first single titled "Bholaa Mania" was released on 4 June 2023. The second single titled "Jam Jam Jajjanaka" was released on 11 July 2023. The third single titled "Milky Beauty" was released on 21 July 2023. The fourth single titled "Rage of Bhola" was released on 5 August 2023. The fifth single titled "Kottara Kottu Teenumaaru" was released on 7 August 2023.

All music is composed by Mahati Swara Sagar.

Track listing
No.	Title	Lyrics	Singer(s)	Length
1.	"Bholaa Mania"	Ramajogayya Sastry	Mahati Swara Sagar, L. V. Revanth	3:55
2.	"Jam Jam Jajjanaka"	Kasarla Shyam	Anurag Kulkarni, Mangli	3:23
3.	"Milky Beauty"	Ramajogayya Sastry	Vijay Prakash, Sanjana Kalmanje, Mahati Swara Sagar	3:35
4.	"Rage of Bhola"	Meher Ramesh, Feroz Israel	Asura, Feroz Israel	3:00
5.	"Kottara Kottu Teenumaaru"	Kasarla Shyam	Rahul Sipligunj	3:35

== Release ==
=== Theatrical ===
Bhola Shankar was theatrically released on 11 August 2023.

=== Home media ===
The digital rights of the film were acquired by Netflix. The film was premiered on Netflix from 15 September 2023.

== Reception ==
Bhola Shankar was panned by critics. Neeshita Nyayapati of The Times of India gave the film 2 out of 5 stars and wrote "Bholaa Shankar suffers because the shift between the various portions of the film is jarring, not to mention, the writing needed a deft hand. Not even Chiranjeevi and Keerthy are enough to save the day." Janani K of India Today gave the film 2 out of 5 stars and wrote "Bholaa Shankar is a remake that no one asked for or a remake that could have had a better adaptation. If only." Abhilasha Cherukuri of Cinema Express rated the film 1.5 out of 5 stars and termed the film as "hollow and distasteful homage to the mass legacy of Chiranjeevi". Raisa Nasreen of Zoom TV gave the film 1.5 out of 5 stars and wrote "A remake of the Tamil film Vedalam, and directed by Meher Ramesh, Bhola Shankar has been altered to suit the sentiments of the Telugu audience."

=== Box office ===
On its opening day, Bholaa Shankar collected approximately ₹20 crore worldwide and went on to gross ₹42.2 crore during its theatrical run, emerging as a box office bomb.
