= Venky Kudumula =

Indian film director

- Born: Venkatesh Kudumula; Khammam district, Telangana, India
- Occupation: Film director
- Years active: 2012–present

Venky Kudumula is an Indian film director who works in Telugu-language films. He has directed three films: Chalo (2018), Bheeshma (2020), and Robinhood (2025).

== Career ==
While studying agriculture and business management at Acharya NG Ranga University, Kudumula forayed into films. He began working as an assistant director to Teja for Neeku Naku Dash Dash (2012) and Thoofan (2013). Kudumula later went on to work as an assistant director in Jadoogadu (2015) and A Aa (2016).

He made his film debut with Chalo (2018). The film starred Naga Shaurya, whom he worked for in Jadoogadu, and Rashmika Mandanna. The film is set in a village on the border of Andhra Pradesh and Tamil Nadu and Tamil actors Mime Gopi and Rajendran were signed to play pivotal roles. In a review of the film by The Times of India the reviewer stated that " Despite the story of Chalo being somewhat a cliché, director Venky somehow cleverly manages to turn the tropes into a fun and interesting ride". In a review of the film by The Hindu, the reviewer, Srivatsan Nadadhur, wrote that "the director Venky Kudumula throws new light on a bunch of stereotypes and age-old rivalry associated with a Romeo-Juliet tale".

Kudumula's next film as a director was Bheeshma starring Nithiin and Rashmika Mandanna. The film marked his second collaboration with Mandanna after Chalo. Bheeshma, similar to Chalo, received positive reviews upon release. In a review of the film by The Hindu, Sangeetha Devi Dundoo, the reviewer, stated that "Venky Kudumula ties up the different threads to the story well". In a review of the film by The Times of India, the reviewer wrote that "What's ... amazing is how Venky ties up all the threads by the end".

In 2021 December, Kudumala's upcoming project with Chiranjeevi was announced. It was supposed to be produced by DVV Entertainments. However, due to undisclosed reasons, the film was dropped and shelved. In 2022, he reunited with both Nithiin and Rashmika for Robinhood, that was to be produced by Mythri Movie Makers. Post the launch of the film, Rashmika was instead replaced by Sreeleela, owing to her busy schedules. The music was composed by G. V. Prakash Kumar. It is slated to release on 28 March 2025, coinciding with Ugadi.

== Filmography ==
Year	Film	Director	Writer	Notes	Ref.
2013	Thoofan	No	Additional Writer		
2018	Chalo	Yes	Yes	Nominated–SIIMA Award for Best Debut Director	
2020	Bheeshma	Yes	Yes		
2025	Robinhood	Yes	Yes		
