= Bheeshma (2020 film) =

2020 film by Venky Kudumula

- Theatrical release poster
- Directed by: Venky Kudumula
- Written by: Venky Kudumula
- Produced by: Suryadevara Naga Vamsi
- Starring: Nithiin; Rashmika Mandanna
- Cinematography: Sai Sriram
- Edited by: Naveen Nooli
- Music by: Mahati Swara Sagar
- Production company: Sithara Entertainments
- Distributed by: Sithara Entertainments
- Release date: 21 February 2020
- Running time: 138 minutes
- Country: India
- Language: Telugu

Bheeshma is a 2020 Indian Telugu-language romantic action comedy film directed by Venky Kudumula and produced by Suryadevara Naga Vamsi, under Sithara Entertainments. The film stars Nithiin and Rashmika Mandanna in the lead roles, while Anant Nag, Jisshu Sengupta, Vennela Kishore and Sampath Raj appear in supporting roles. The music was composed by Mahati Swara Sagar, while the cinematography and editing were handled by Sai Sriram and Naveen Nooli respectively. Bheeshma was released on 21 February 2020 to positive reviews from critics and became a commercial success at the box office.

== Plot ==
Bheeshma is the CEO of "Bheeshma Organics" who wants farmers to shift from using chemicals in farming to organic practices. Bheeshma gets them to shift in organic farming and announces to the media that he will announce the next CEO on the company's 50th anniversary. Meanwhile, Bheeshma Prasad is a single man who seeks to find love, where he attends his friend Parimal's boss' pre-wedding party and meets Sarah. Bheeshma introduces himself as Bheeshma I.A.S. (I am Single) to Sarah and gets her to elope with him, but Sarah gets him stuck with the police and Parimal gets fired. Bheeshma's uncle JP has to bail him out by calling his classmate ACP Deva, who later asks JP to bring Bheeshma in order to teach him a lesson as he believes Bheeshma is a "loser" since he lives his life as a meme creator.

Later, JP tells Bheeshma's father Anand Prasad that Bheeshma is serving a punishment with Deva and it is revealed that Anand and Deva were classmates and Bheeshma touched his daughter when they were little, which caused a split between both of them. One day, Bheeshma meets Chaitra and introduces to her as ACP Bheeshma as he is in a police vehicle and Chaitra introduces herself as an employee of Bheeshma Organics. Bheeshma decides to go with her and he ends up learning about organic farming. Raghavan, who is the CEO of Field Science, introduces a product called "Instant" which produces a six-month yield in four months by the use of chemicals and tries to influence some of Bheeshma's farmers by setting up a live interaction with Bheeshma.

After a few hilarious twists, Bheeshma finds out that Chaitra is Deva's daughter. Deva soon develops a good opinion about Bheeshma, but Chaitra doesn't like him. Chaitra and Bheeshma leave for the interaction, where Bheeshma finds his friend Parimal and that he works for Field Science. Bheeshma talks about the greatness of organic farming during the interaction and wins over Chaitra. Suddenly, Deva's constable sends a picture of them hugging. Deva gets enraged and goes to Bheeshma's house, where he finds that Anand is Bheeshma's father and holds Bheeshma at gunpoint. Anand reveals that Bheeshma is the grandson of Sr. Bheeshma and he is the next CEO of Bheeshma Organics. Deva and Bheeshma are shocked and the media soon learn about this.

When Bheeshma is ready to leave to take care of his grandfather, it is revealed that Anand lied to Deva in order to keep his son alive. Bheeshma is shocked and Chaitra breaksup with him saying that her father wants her to marry him since he is the grandson of Sr. Bheeshma and tells that she knows that he is not Bheeshma's grandson. Bheeshma decides to tell the truth to Deva, but is surprised when Sr. Bheeshma announces him as an operational CEO of the company for 30 days. Bheeshma is shocked by this decision and Chaitra despises him even more. Bheeshma also finds out that Parimal lost his job at Field Science due to Raghavan learning that Parimal is Bheeshma's friend and he joins as a driver for Bheeshma.

Bheeshma is shown around the office and he quickly wins over the employees, where he also saves a village from signing from Field Science enraging Raghavan and also wins back Chaitra's love. Raghavan decides to make sure Bheeshma is not the next CEO by giving a poisonous hybrid plant to Sr. Bheeshma, who later gets hospitalized and also plants chemically made plants in Bheeshma's warehouse to further make the company lose reputation with a police raid. Raghavan invites Agricultural Minister Ajay Varma, to launch Instant to the world, but Ajay tells that the product is made with harmful chemicals and cancels the license of Field Science which surprises Raghavan and gets admitted to the hospital.

Raghavan soon finds out that Sr. Bheeshma is alive and he was only hospitalized due to a high fever. The plant which Raghavan sent was actually destroyed by Parimal, thinking that the plant was for Jr. Bheeshma when it was actually for Sr. Bheeshma. Jr. Bheeshma suggests Parimal to replace the plant with a similar looking plant without the poisonous properties. Bheeshma also reveals that he found Sarah and Ajay in a hotel room and had blackmailed to telecast their relationship to the public in exchange for Ajay to provide a speech about the harmful chemicals present in Instant and the police found out about Raghavan planting the plants. Bheeshma is later appointed as the full-time CEO of Bheeshma Organics where Chaitra and Bheeshma finally marry with the approval of their parents.

== Cast ==
- Nithiin as Bheeshma "Bheeshma Jr." Prasad
- Rashmika Mandanna as Chaitra, Bheeshma Jr's love interest
- Anant Nag as Bheeshma Sr., CEO of Bheeshma Organics
- Jisshu Sengupta as Raghavan, a scientist and CEO of Field science (Voice dubbed by Hemachandra)
- Vennela Kishore as Parimal, Bheeshma Prasad's friend turned arch-enemy
- Sampath Raj as Deva, Chaitra's father and Assistant Commissioner of Police
- Ajay as Ajay Varma, Agricultural Minister and Sarah's boyfriend
- Naresh as Anand Prasad, Bheeshma Jr.'s father and Deva's friend
- Praveena as Deepa, Bheeshma Jr.'s mother
- Brahmaji as JP, Deva and Anand Prasad's friend, a journalist
- Mime Gopi as Purushottam, Sarpanch of Singannapalem
- Kalyani Natarajan as Kalyani, Deva's wife and Chaitra's mother
- Raghu Babu as Balram, an employee of Bheeshma Organics
- Subhalekha Sudhakar as Ramaraju, Bheeshma sr's friend
- Sathyan as Parimal's boss and Sarah's husband
- Satya as Uber driver
- Shivakumar Ramachandravarapu as Shiva
- Appaji Ambarisha Darbha as Sr Bheeshma's PA
- Rajiv Kumar Aneja as Pandey ji
- Narra Srinivas as Raghavan's elder brother
- Sudharshan as Employee
- Hebah Patel as Sarah (cameo appearance)
- Avantika Mishra as herself in the song "Singles Anthem"
- Kalpa Latha as a maid at Bheeshma's house

== Production ==
The film was announced on 30 March 2019, by Rashmika Mandanna through social media platforms, coinciding with Nithiin's birthday. The pooja ceremony and the principal photography was done in mid May 2019. Filming was lasted until late December 2019. Kannada actor Anant Nag was signed to play a pivotal role while, Bengali actor Jisshu Sengupta was signed to portray the antagonist. The song "Hey Choosa" was shot in Positano, Italy.

== Release ==
The film initially aimed at 25 December 2019, but was released on 21 February 2020.

=== Home media ===
The film was released on Netflix and Sun NXT, (along with dubbed versions in Tamil, Kannada and Malayalam) on 9 April 2020 with English Subtitles. The Hindi dubbed version was directly premiered on Dhinchaak TV channel (now renamed to Goldmines) on 19 February 2022.

== Soundtrack ==
Bheeshma

Soundtrack album by Mahati Swara Sagar
- Released: 27 December 2019
- Recorded: 2019–2020
- Genre: Feature Film Soundtrack
- Length: 18:30
- Label: Aditya Music
- Producer: Mahati Swara Sagar

Mahati Swara Sagar chronology
Nartanasala (2018)	Bheeshma (2019)	Ishq (2021)

The music was composed by Mahati Swara Sagar.

All lyrics are written by Sri Mani.

No.	Title	Lyrics	Singer(s)	Length
1.	"Singles Anthem"	Sri Mani	Anurag Kulkarni	3:23
2.	"Whattey Beauty"	Kasarla Shyam	Dhanunjay, Amala Chebolu	3:55
3.	"Sara Sari"	Sri Mani	Anurag Kulkarni	4:01
4.	"Super Cute"	Sri Mani	Nakash Aziz	3:41
5.	"Hey Choosa"	Krishna Chaitanya	Sanjana Kalmanje	3:30
Total length:				18:30

== Reception ==
=== Critical response ===
The film opened to positive reviews from critics on the first day of its release with praise for its performances, comedy, songs and dance numbers.

Sangeetha Devi Dundoo of The Hindu, appreciated the film's use of humour and wrote: "Director Venky Kudumula places such a character in the centre of a farming war. The result is a partly farcical comedy that’s at times deliberately frustrating and at other times, lends itself to laugh aloud segments." Australian Stars rated it 4/5 "A great entertainer, The whole cast was amazing and Venky's movie is all the way a winner. This is your perfect weekend watch." Times of India editor rated 3/5 star and stated "If you loved Chalo, giving Bheeshma a chance is a no-brainer (pun intended). Just don’t go expecting something even remotely sane or novel and you won’t be disappointed."

=== Box office ===
In the overseas the film has collected a gross of $684,000 on its first weekend.

== Accolades ==
Award (Note: Awards, festivals and organizations are in alphabetical order.)	Date of ceremony (Note: Date is linked to the article about the awards held that year, wherever possible.)	Category	Recipient(s)	Result	Ref.
South Indian International Movie Awards	19 September 2021	Best Film – Telugu	Sithara Entertainments	Nominated	
South Indian International Movie Awards	19 September 2021	Best Director – Telugu	Venky Kudumula	Nominated	
South Indian International Movie Awards	19 September 2021	Best Actor – Telugu	Nithiin	Nominated	
South Indian International Movie Awards	19 September 2021	Best Actor in a Negative Role – Telugu	Jisshu Sengupta	Nominated	
South Indian International Movie Awards	19 September 2021	Best Comedian – Telugu	Vennela Kishore	Won	
South Indian International Movie Awards	19 September 2021	Best Music Director – Telugu	Mahati Swara Sagar	Nominated	
South Indian International Movie Awards	19 September 2021	Best Cinematographer – Telugu	Sai Sriram	Nominated	
South Indian International Movie Awards	19 September 2021	Best Music Director – Telugu	Mahati Swara Sagar	Nominated	
