= Extra Ordinary Man =

2023 Indian action comedy film by Vakkantham Vamsi

- Theatrical release poster
- Directed by: Vakkantham Vamsi
- Written by: Vakkantham Vamsi
- Produced by: N. Sudhakar Reddy; N. Nikitha Reddy
- Starring: Nithiin; Sreeleela; Rajasekhar
- Cinematography: J. Yuvaraj; Arthur A. Wilson; Sai Sriram
- Edited by: Prawin Pudi
- Music by: Harris Jayaraj
- Production companies: Sreshth Movies; Ruchira Entertainments
- Release date: 8 December 2023
- Running time: 157 minutes
- Country: India
- Language: Telugu
- Budget: ₹35 crore
- Box office: ₹10.25 crore

Extra Ordinary Man is a 2023 Indian Telugu-language action comedy film written and directed by Vakkantham Vamsi. The film stars Nithiin, Sreeleela, and Rajasekhar, while Sudev Nair, Rao Ramesh, Rohini, and Sampath Raj play supporting roles. The music was composed by Harris Jayaraj. Extra Ordinary Man was released on 8 December 2023 to negative reviews from critics and became a box-office bomb.

== Plot ==
Abhinay "Abhi", a recruit of Selvamani, a drug lord and music freak, narrates his past to the latter.

Past: Abhi, a junior artist with aspirations of becoming an actor in Telugu cinema, lives in Hyderabad with his parents Somsasekharam and Usha. He meets Likitha, a business tycoon, and they both begin to fall for each other. Abhi gets a job at her company but soon resigns after he gets a chance to act as the lead role in a film directed by his friend Rakesh. Somashekaram kicks Abhi out of the house after learning about his resignation, while Rakesh changes his mind and removes Abhi from the film.

Abhi gets heartbroken and goes to a dhaba for a drink, where he gets into a fight with some goons and thrashes Loki, the brother of a dreaded gangster Nero. Abhi gets surprised that Nero is the name of the antagonist in Rakesh's script. Additionally, he learns that all the occurring events are based on the script. Abhi assumes that this is all Maisamma's will, so he does not act in the film, and he follows the written script and recreates it in real life. Abhi confronts Nero as SI Sai Saitan Nath (the main protagonist of the script) and challenges Nero to defeat him. After knowing the facts, Nero confronts Abhi and burns the script.

After that, Abhi makes a deal with Nero to raise him as the protagonist against him, and Nero can later kill him to sustain his power. As per the plan, Sai stops Nero's crimes, resulting in a fierce confrontation. Meanwhile, Likitha, Somasekharam, and Usha arrive to meet Abhi, assuming he is in a film shooting. After observing the true situation, they decided to act in front of the villagers as Likitha's parents, who made Abhi act like an orphan. The villagers take the initiative to fix the marriage of Abhi and Likitha. Later, Nero pulls IG Vijay Chakravarthy into the issue, but Vijay, after believing the facts, stands by Abhi and adds more fuel to the fire.

In a final confrontation, Nero stabs Abhi and reveals his real identity to Vijay to declare him a cop to save their reputation. However, Abhi survives and tells Nero that the last confrontation is the pre-climax of the film and that Nero's death is the film's ending. Abhi kills Nero in front of Vijay, but Vijay manages the situation and gives Abhi a new identity to catch Selvamani.

Present: After narrating his past, Abhi arrests Selvamani, who leaves his revenge on Abhi because of his admiration for his performance. Later, Vijay assigns Abhi a new task to capture an international gangster.

== Cast ==
- Nithiin as Abhinay "Abhi"/SI Sainath "Saithan".
- Sreeleela as Likitha
- Rajasekhar as IG Vijay Chakravarthy IPS
- Sudev Nair as Niranjan alias Nero
- Rao Ramesh as Somasekhar, Abhinay's father
- Rohini as Usha, Abhinay's mother
- Brahmanandam as Satyanarayana
- Sampath Raj as Selvamani
- Brahmaji as Pathro
- Ajay as Traffic police officer Bhaskar
- Harsha Vardhan as Mohanthi
- Suman as DGP S. Arjun Baldev
- Pradeep Kondiparthi as Govindharaju, Likitha's grandfather
- Annapurna as Rajyalakshmi, Likitha's grandmother
- Pavitra Lokesh as Devaki Chakravarthy, Likitha's mother
- Suhasini Maniratnam as Snehalatha, Abhi's mother
- Giri Babu as Rama Chandra Murthy, Abhi's father
- Chandra Mohan as Chandram, Likitha's father
- Ravi Varma as Patnaik
- Hyper Aadi as Constable Ganga
- Jagadeesh Prathap Bandari as Abhinay's friend
- Soniya Singh as Constable Valli
- Satyasri as Constable Lakshmi
- Hari Teja as Sam
- Srikanth Iyengar as Anand Rao
- Prudhvi Raj as Yadav
- Shivakumar Ramachandravarapu as Rocky
- Nassar as Satyanarayana Murthy, Likitha's uncle
- Satya Krishnan as Satya Muddukrishna, Likitha's aunt
- Chatrapathi Sekhar as Villager
- Rupa Lakshmi Subhadra, Abhi's aunt
- Sivannarayana Naripeddi as Gangadhara Rao, Abhi's uncle (uncredited)
- Chammak Chandra as Paidthalli (uncredited)
- Jani Master as a special appearance in the song "Ole Ole Paapaayi"

== Production ==
The principal photography of the film started in June 2023. The filming was completed in 60 days and wrapped up in August 2023.

== Soundtrack ==
Extra Ordinary Man

Soundtrack album by Harris Jayaraj
- Released: 6 November 2023
- Studios: Studio H, Chennai
- Genre: Film soundtrack
- Label: Aditya Music
- Producer: Harris Jayaraj

Harris Jayaraj chronology
The Legend (2022)	Extra Ordinary Man (2023)	Brother (2024)

The music and background score are composed by Harris Jayaraj. The audio rights were acquired by Aditya Music. The first single, "Danger Pilla", was released on 2 August. The placement of the "Pette Thalam" song (reused Gururaj's composition for Manmadha Ravula Kosam) in the film's second half received criticism.

Tracklist
No.	Title	Lyrics	Music	Singer(s)	Length
1.	"Danger Pilla"	Krishna Kanth	Harris Jayaraj	Armaan Malik	4:26
2.	"Brush Vesko"	Ramajogayya Sastry	Harris Jayaraj	Sanjith Hegde	4:24
3.	"Ole Ole Paapaayi"	Kasarla Shyam	Harris Jayaraj	Ram Miriyala; Priya Himesh	3:44
4.	"Sirraaku Thaandavam"	Ramajogayya Sastry	Harris Jayaraj	Ram Miriyala	4:08
5.	"Pette Thalam"	Kasarla Shyam	Gururaj	Maneesha Pandranki, Sai Charan	1:21
Total length:					18:03

== Release ==
=== Theatrical ===
Extra Ordinary Man was expected to be released on 23 December 2023 during Christmas, but was preponed to 8 December 2023. It released along with the movie Hi Nanna.

=== Home media ===
The film was premiered on Disney+ Hotstar on 19 January 2024 in Telugu and Tamil languages.

== Reception ==
Srivathsan Nadadhur of OTTplay gave 3/5 stars and wrote "Extra Ordinary Man is an irreverent, hilarious ode to cinema. Vakkantham Vamsi chooses an entertaining, 'lightweight' script for his second directorial, playing to the strengths of his capable cast." Paul Nicodemus of The Times of India gave 2.5/5 stars and wrote "Extra Ordinary Man could have been more impactful had it maintained the energy, characterisation, and vibe from the first half."

NTV gave 2/5 stars and wrote "An ordinary routine film in pursuit of becoming Extra Ordinary became silly and pointless." Raghu Bandi of The Indian Express gave 1.5/5 stars and wrote "Vakkantham Vamsi's writing is poor, illogical and hardly entertains. His direction is equally lackluster."

Neeshita Nyayapati of Hindustan Times called it "most ridiculous film of 2023" and wrote "Director Vakkantham Vamsi's Nithiin and Sreeleela-starrer almost seems to spoof everything that's laughable about commercial cinema." BVS Prakash of Deccan Chronicle wrote "After disasters like Maestro and Macherla Niyojakavargam, young actor Nithin has again chosen a lackluster plot 'Extra' Ordinary Man which falls flat on its face. It neither boasts of a novel plot nor has an interesting narration."

Sangeetha Devi Dundoo of The Hindu wrote the film "is sometimes smart, sometimes silly and overstretched, but ensures plenty of laughs". Ram Venkat Srikar of Film Companion wrote "Extra Ordinary Man is a film that works on a writing level more than its final form. The ideas are so much fun, and you can totally see what the film could have been."
