= Kosuri Venugopal =

- Born: Narasapuram, West Godavari district
- Died: September 23, 2020; Hyderabad
- Occupation: Actor
- Years active: 1994 - 2020

Kosuri Venugopal was a Telugu film and television actor. He hailed from Narasapuram in West Godavari district. He worked in the Food Corporation of India job. Alongside his profession, he acted in the film industry for more than 27 years in around 30 films. He began his acting career with the film Tegimpu directed by P. N. Ramachandra Rao. He gained recognition with the film Maryada Ramanna (2010), directed by S. S. Rajamouli.

He died on 23 September 2020 due to COVID-19.

== Film career ==
Kosuri Venugopal worked in the film industry for 27 years. His debut film as an actor was Tegimpu (1994), directed by P. N. Ramachandra Rao. He gained popularity with Maryada Ramanna, directed by S. S. Rajamouli, in which he played the role of Brahmaji's father. Except Student No. 1, he appeared in almost all Rajamouli's films.

He played the role of Vennela Kishore's father in the film Chalo, starring Naga Shaurya. His last film as an actor was Ami Thumi, directed by Indraganti Mohana Krishna.

== Death ==
After contracting COVID-19, he was on a ventilator for about 23 days in a private hospital in Gachibowli, Hyderabad. Although he later tested negative, he died on 23 September 2020.

== Filmography ==
- Tegimpu (1994)
- Vikramarkudu (2006)
- Maryada Ramanna (2010)
- Pilla Zamindar (2011)
- Ami Thumi (2017)
- Chalo (2018)
