= Nenu Student Sir =

2023 Telugu action thriller film

- Directed by: Rakhi Uppalapati
- Written by: Krishna Chaitanya; Kalyan Chakravarthy
- Produced by: Satish Varma
- Starring: Bellamkonda Ganesh; Avantika Dasani
- Cinematography: Anith Madadi
- Edited by: Chota K. Prasad
- Music by: Mahati Swara Sagar
- Production company: SV2 Entertainment
- Release date: 2 June 2023
- Running time: 128 minutes
- Country: India
- Language: Telugu

Nenu Student Sir (transl. I am a student, sir) is a 2023 Indian Telugu-language action thriller film directed by Rakhi Uppalapati, in his directorial debut and produced by Satish Varma under the SV2 Entertainment banner. The film stars Bellamkonda Ganesh and Avantika Dasani, while Samuthirakani, Sunil and Srikanth Iyyengar play supporting roles.

== Plot ==
Subbu, a college student, is obsessed with getting an iPhone. He buys the newest model, but a fight breaks out between two student groups at his college the next day. The police seize all the phones involved before any counselling can happen. Subbu’s phone vanishes from the tray where the police kept it. He tries to get his phone back by asking Commissioner of Police Vasudevan for help. But he is disappointed when the help he expects doesn’t come. Subbu thinks that making friends with Shruti, the commissioner’s daughter and a student at his college, will help him get his phone back. Subbu and Shruti become closer and fall in love. But his relationship with her gets him into a murder case. He finds out how 1.75 crore came into his bank account, and the story ends happily because he escapes from the crime.

== Cast ==
- Bellamkonda Ganesh as Subbu
- Avantika Dasani as Shruti
- Samuthirakani as Arjun Vasudevan
- Sunil
- Srikanth Iyyengar
- Auto Ramprasad
- Charandeep
- Pramodhini
- Ravi Sivateja
- Naandhi Satish Varma
- Kamal Teja Narla
- Gemini Suresh
- Karthik Kevvu

== Soundtrack ==
The film score and soundtrack album of the film is composed by Mahati Swara Sagar. The music rights were acquired by Aditya Music.

The soundtrack consists of two songs: "Maaye Maaye" and "24/7 Okate Dhyaasa".

== Release ==
The film was initially scheduled for 10 March 2023, but due to student examinations, it was screened on 2 June 2023.

== Reception ==
=== Critical reception ===
Nenu Student Sir received mixed reviews from critics and audience. Paul Nicodemus of The Times of India gave 2.5 out of 5 stars and wrote "Ganesh Bellamkonda gives his best, but the narrative needed to be tighter. The action sequences, like the police chase where Subbu is on foot, need better choreography, but overall, the team does a decent job.
