= Maestro (2021 film) =

Film by Merlapaka Gandhi

- Official release poster
- Directed by: Merlapaka Gandhi
- Screenplay by: Merlapaka Gandhi
- Based on: Andhadhun (2018) by Sriram Raghavan
- Produced by: Sudhakar Reddy; Nikitha Reddy
- Starring: Tamannaah; Nithiin; Nabha Natesh; Jisshu Sengupta
- Cinematography: J. Yuvaraj
- Edited by: M. S. Rajashekhar Reddy (S. R. Shekhar)
- Music by: Mahati Swara Sagar
- Production company: Sreshth Movies
- Distributed by: Disney+ Hotstar
- Release date: 17 September 2021
- Running time: 135 minutes
- Country: India
- Language: Telugu

Maestro is a 2021 Indian Telugu-language black comedy crime thriller film directed by Merlapaka Gandhi. The film stars Nithiin, Tamannaah Bhatia, Nabha Natesh and Jisshu Sengupta. A remake of the 2018 Hindi film Andhadhun, it follows a blind piano player who unwittingly becomes embroiled in the murder of a former actor.

Principal photography began in December 2020 and ended in June 2021, with filming taking place in Hyderabad, Goa and Dubai. Due to the COVID-19 pandemic in India, the film skipped a theatrical release and had a direct-to-streaming release via Disney+ Hotstar on 17 September 2021.

== Plot ==
In Goa, Arun is a pianist who fakes his blindness to hone his focus on music and ignore his surroundings. He meets Sophie to buy her piano but offers to play it in her father's restaurant. Overtime, Arun and Sophie grow close and begin a relationship. Mohan, a retired actor and construction business owner, has recently married a younger woman, Simran, and has a grown-up daughter, Pavitra from a previous marriage. One day, Mohan is impressed with Arun's performance at the restaurant and hires him for a private concert in occasion of his wedding anniversary. Mohan lies to Simran that he will not return from Bangalore until that evening, intending to surprise her.

The next day when Arun visits Mohan's apartment, Simran says he is not home but Arun asks her to confirm with him. Seeing their neighbour Mrs. D'Souza watching them and trusting that Arun is blind, Simran invites him in and pretends as if she has called Mohan. As Arun plays the piano for a stressed Simran, he glimpses a corpse lying on the floor. Arun realizes that the body is Mohan's and discovers Bobby, Simran's paramour, hiding in the washroom. Arun feigns ignorance while Simran and Bobby clean the crime scene and stuff Mohan's corpse into a suitcase, which a disguised Bobby takes away. It is revealed in a flashback that Mohan discovered Simran and Bobby's extra-marital affair when he arrived home, which led to his death. Arun leaves when Simran uses voice recordings to pretend that Mohan has come and is leaving to deal with a property issue along with ₹1 crore (US$100,000).

Shortly after, Arun attempts to report the murder at a police station, only to learn Bobby is an inspector stationed there. He becomes conflicted over what to do, concerning Sophie. Mohan is found in a car, seemingly murdered for the money he was carrying with him. A man is arrested for the crime after he finds Mohan's watch. Arun plays at Mohan's condolence ceremony, where Mrs. D'Souza tells SI Srinivas Naik that she had seen someone (Bobby) visiting Simran even before Mohan and Arun. After Srinivas notifies Bobby, he informs Simran and she later pushes Mrs. D'Souza off the balcony. Arun witnesses this as he comes to teach piano to Pavitra, but is forced to continue playing blind. Police conclude that Mrs. D'Souza slipped off the balcony as the floor was wet.

Arun plans to reveal the truth to Sophie. Unknown to him, his neighbour's son films Arun's actions to prove he is not blind. Simran unexpectedly visits to give Arun offerings of the prayer she conducted for Mohan, testing his condition. After he intentionally drops a cup of poisoned coffee, Simran threatens Arun with a fake gun, forcing him to drop his charade. Arun promises not to reveal her murders to anyone. Simran explains that she truly loved Mohan but her meeting Bobby and their subsequent affair changed her life. She claims if Mohan had not paid a surprise visit, she would have been happy with him, as his death was an accident. Arun passes out from the spiked offerings. When Sophie arrives, the boy shows her the video. She goes to confront Arun and finds him unconscious and half-dressed with Simran, who lies that they are lovers. Feeling betrayed, Sophie storms off, breaking up with Arun. After Arun wakes up, he finds that the poison blinded him for real to ensure his silence. Before leaving, Simran deletes the boy's video.

Arun tries to explain himself to Sophie, but she refuses to listen. He initially resigns himself to leaving Goa until he runs into Pavitra and Simran at the train station. Pavitra is suspicious of her father's death. Simran privately warns Arun that she was driven to her crimes due to circumstances but will kill her stepdaughter if needed. Concerned for Pavitra's life, Arun gets off the train and meets with an accident. An auto driver, Murali, and his elder sister, whom Arun previously purchased a lottery ticket from, admit him to Dr. Swamy. They plan to sell Arun's organs but he describes his last meeting with Murali and his sister, proving that he once had eyesight. Arun concocts a plan with them to earn 1 crore and take down Simran. Bobby orders Simran to murder Pavitra and cover it up as her committing suicide out of depression. However, Arun intervenes and leaves with Simran, who tries to take him to Bobby but gets abducted.

Arun, Murali and his sister pretend Simran committed suicide and call Bobby's wife, Lakshmi, exposing his affair to her and blackmailing them for 1 crore. Lakshmi confronts Bobby, who convinces her not to hurt him and agrees to end the issue. Murali and his sister betray Arun to keep the money for themselves and tie up him along with Simran. However, Bobby shoots Murali and boards the elevator to find his sister. Murali calls his sister, who switches the elevator off. Bobby tries to shoot open the doors but the bullet ricochets and kills him. Murali's sister takes him to the hospital but finds that the money Bobby bought is counterfeit. Meanwhile, Simran proposes a truce with Arun to escape but silently frees herself and attacks him. Swamy arrives and after a scuffle, renders Simran unconscious using chloroform. As they drive to Goa airport, Swamy reveals that Simran has a rare blood type so he plans to sell her organs and also suggests that her cornea can restore Arun's eyesight.

Two years later, Sophie comes across Arun performing in Dubai and he tells her what happened. Swamy stopped the car to check on Simran but she stabbed him to death and took over the vehicle. Arun asked "Swamy" to hand over Simran to the police instead, before Simran revealed herself. Arun then got a phone call from Pavitra, who found Mohan's missing money in Simran's possessions, proof that her stepmother murdered her father, and is bringing it to the police. He tried to reason with Simran to turn herself in, but she dropped Arun off and tried to run him over. Simran then lost control of the car when a hare shot by a farmer nearby hit the windshield, killing her. In the present, Sophie reconciles with Arun and believes that he should have taken Simran's cornea. As Arun leaves, he uses his walking stick to knock a can in his path into a trash bin, hinting that he did take Simran's cornea. At a charity gala with Mohan in the past, Simran had pledged her organs to be donated after her death.

== Cast ==
- Nithiin as Arun, a pianist
- Tamannaah Bhatia as Simran, wife of Mohan
- Nabha Natesh as Sophie, Arun's girlfriend
- Jisshu Sengupta as CI N. Ravindar / Bobby
- Naresh as Mohan, former film actor
- Brahmanandam as Krishna Satyannarayana
- Ashish Vidyarthi as Raj Gopal, Arun's father
- Suhasini Maniratnam as Vasanthi, Arun's mother
- Nassar as Raghunath, Simran's father
- Janaki Sabesh as Rajyalakshmi, Simran's mother
- Harsha Vardhan as Dr. Swamy
- Racha Ravi as Murali, an auto driver
- Mangli as sister of Murali
- Sreemukhi as Lakshmi / Lucky, wife of N. Ravindar
- Ananya Nagalla as Pavithra, daughter of Mohan
- Lahari Shari as a TV Reporter
- Duvvasi Mohan as Musical instrument shop owner
- Srinivasa Reddy as SI P. Srinivas Naik
- Master Nikhil as Tinku

== Production ==
In September 2019, The Times of India reported that Nithiin's father Sudhakar Reddy acquired the rights for the Telugu remake of Andhadhun (2018). In February 2020, Nithiin confirmed that he will be featuring in the same. Directed by Merlapaka Gandhi, the film was formally launched with a pooja ceremony in that month. The music is composed by Mahati Swara Sagar while J. Yuvaraj is signed as the director of photography. In March 2021, the film's title was unveiled as Maestro.

In September 2020, Tamannaah Bhatia and Nabha Natesh were cast in the roles played by Tabu and Radhika Apte respectively in the original. Tamannaah sought not to emulate Tabu, but give the character her own interpretation, and avoided re-watching Andhadhun. Nabha noted that her character "will be tweaked" to suit the Telugu nativity.

Principal photography was originally scheduled to begin in November 2020, but ultimately began in Dubai in December. Filming took place in Hyderabad in March 2021. Due to the COVID-19 lockdown in India, filming was paused for two months i.e., April and May. The final schedule resumed on 14 June 2021 in Errum Manzil, Hyderabad, and ended on 20 June.

== Music ==
Maestro

Soundtrack album by Mahati Swara Sagar
- Recorded: 2021
- Genre: Feature film soundtrack
- Language: Telugu
- Label: Aditya Music
- Producer: Mahati Swara Sagar

Mahati Swara Sagar chronology
| Ishq (2021) | Maestro (2021) | Kinnerasani (2022) |

Mahati Swara Sagar is the composer of the score and soundtrack. The first single "Baby O Baby" was released on 16 July 2021 by Aditya Music. The second single "Vennello Aadapilla" was released on 6 August 2021. The third single "La La La" was released on 6 September 2021. The last single "Shuru Karo" was released on 12 September 2021.

All music is composed by Mahati Swara Sagar.

| No. | Title | Lyrics | Singer(s) | Length |
|---|---|---|---|---|
| 1. | "Baby O Baby" | Sreejo | Anurag Kulkarni | 4:17 |
| 2. | "Vennello Aadapilla" | Sreejo, Krishna Chaitanya | Sweekar Agasthi | 3:31 |
| 3. | "La La La" | Kasarla Shyam | Dhanunjay Seepana | 2:40 |
| 4. | "Shuru Karo" | Shreemani | L. V. Revanth | 3:51 |

== Release ==
In February 2021, the film's release date was announced as 11 June 2021. In August 2021, it was announced officially that the film would be skipping theatres due to the COVID-19 pandemic in India; instead it would have a direct-to-streaming release on Disney+ Hotstar. The film was released on 17 September 2021. In the United States, the film was released on Hotstar's corporate sibling Hulu as Hotstar ceased operations in the country.

== Reception ==
Neeshita Nyayapati of The Times of India gave Maestro a rating of 3 out of 5, calling it "a pulpy remake" and wrote that it "might not be the classic Ilairayaaja number it set out to be but it still remains as catchy as the latest peppy number. That makes it worth a watch". Writing for Firstpost, Sankeertana Varma opined that Maestro never pretends to be anything but a tamed version of its original, giving a rating of 3 out 5. Hindustan Times critic Haricharan Pudipeddi said that "Despite not making any effort to leave a lasting impression, it still works as a good-enough entertainer. The minor tweaks to suit Telugu sensibilities, helps Maestro stay true to the original to a large extent but the audience is spoon-fed a lot too."

Reviewing the performances, Sangeetha Devi Dundoo of The Hindu wrote, "Nithiin seems to have enjoyed being part of a story that stands out from mainstream Telugu films, and Nabha is at ease playing the girlfriend. It isn't a complicated part and she does well. It is appreciable that Tamannaah has dubbed herself, but her laboured Telugu diction doesn't cut it. Alas, she is no Tabu." On the technical aspects, The News Minute's Balakrishna Ganeshan said that the music and Mahati Swara Sagar's background music did justice the film and Yuvraj's camera work "keeps the movie upbeat."

A critic of Eenadu praised the performances of Nithiin and Tamannaah, first-half screenplay and the production values while pointing out second-half screenplay negative as its drawback. Manoj Kumar R of The Indian Express called it an "unwitty remake", adding "Director Merlapaka Gandhi has turned the pulsating white-knuckled ride into a story of a damsel in distress. Nitthin-starrer has none of the moral ambiguity or smarts of Ayushmann Khurrana-Tabu original." Mukesh Manjunath of Film Companion wrote, "The lack of humor and its blandness makes the thrills seem milder because the audience is never distracted enough with humor."
