= D/O Varma =

D/O Varma (D/o Ramgopal Varma)
- Directed by: Dr.Khaja Pasha (Dr MD Khaja MansurR)
- Written by: Dr. Khaja Pasha(Dr MD Khaja MansurR)
- Screenplay by: Dr. Khaja Pasha(Dr MD Khaja MansurR)
- Based on: story of a popular celebrity who flirts young girls (family drama and fun between 38 yrs old father 20 years old daughter 3 years old grandson)
- Starring: Vennela Kishore; Naveena Jackson
- Cinematography: P.G.Vindha
- Edited by: Praveen Pudi
- Music by: Aadesh Ravi
- Production company: Annapurna
- Distributed by: F3
- Release date: 15 May 2013
- Running time: 120 minutes
- Country: India
- Language: Telugu
- Budget: 90 lakhs INR
- Box office: 120 lakhs INR

D/O Varma is a 2013 Indian Telugu language film directed by Khaja.

== Cast ==
- Vennela Kishore as Rao Gopal Warma
- Naveena Jackson as Deeksha
- Roja as Ganga
- Jogi Naidu as Rambabu
- Dhanraj
- Jeeva
- Shankar Melkote

== Release ==
The movie was released on 15 May 2013.

== Reception ==
A critic from The Times of India wrote that "Director Khaja explores a subject that is not of the routine nature. It describes emotions that are more valuable than riches. Perhaps it is not something that can be called a popular subject but it sure can be described as meaningful cinema".
