= Itlu Maredumilli Prajaneekam =

2022 film by AR Mohan

- Theatrical release poster
- Directed by: A. R. Mohan
- Screenplay by: A. R. Mohan
- Dialogues by: Abburi Ravi
- Story by: A. R. Mohan
- Produced by: Razesh Danda
- Starring: Allari Naresh; Anandhi
- Cinematography: Raam Reddy
- Edited by: Chota K. Prasad
- Music by: Sricharan Pakala
- Production companies: Zee Studios; Hasya Movies
- Release date: 25 November 2022
- Country: India
- Language: Telugu

Itlu Maredumilli Prajaneekam (transl. Sincerely, the people of Maredumilli) is a 2022 Indian Telugu-language social thriller drama film remake of 2017 film Newton written and directed by debutant A. R. Mohan. Produced by Zee Studios and Hasya Movies, the film features Allari Naresh and Anandhi, while Vennela Kishore, Praveen, Sampath Raj, and Sritej play supporting roles. The film was released on 25 November 2022.

== Plot ==
Sripada Srinivas is a humble human who always helps people in need. He works as a government Telugu teacher and understands the value of Telugu. He and another English teacher are appointed as election officers for tribal villages in the Maredumilli forest area.

The tribals are initially reluctant to cast their votes, as past governments have not built a bridge over a nearby river to ease transport and have not cared to provide basic facilities to them for the last 30 years. He meets Lachimi, the only unofficial teacher to the whole tribe. She wishes to study and become a teacher, but does not have a bridge in their area. Thus, she cannot study further, so she teaches basic skills to kids in the tribe unofficially. She offers help to Srinivas in raising awareness to cast their votes. While traveling, Srinivas likes Lachimi for her self-confidence and her worshipping nature towards teachers; finally, he proposes to marry her.

Later, Srinivas helps one of the tribal women, Pollamma, deliver a child, thereby earning the tribal members' trust. After this incident, the tribals agree to cast their votes, trusting Srinivas. While going back to deliver the EVMs, Srinivas and the English teacher are ambushed by the tribals, who kidnap both the officers and ask for bridges to be installed as a negotiation demand. Later, it is revealed that the mastermind behind this conspiracy is none other than Srinivas. He guides the tribals to negotiate with them and makes their issues a nationwide sensation.

After various attempts in vain, District Collector Arjun Trivedi fools the tribals by giving them approval papers, then he betrays them after collecting the EVM machines. Then Srinivas reveals himself to Trivedi and tries to stop him. Trivedi realizes that Srinivas is the mastermind behind the conspiracy, bashes him, and later takes him into custody despite the tribals' pleas.

While returning, they cross paths with an Indian gaur herd (the locals treat them as Veerabhadra gods). Trivedi, being headstrong, asks the cops to scare the herd away, if not kill them. Herds attack and injure most of the cops, including Trivedi. Hearing all the ruckus, the tribals come to the cops' aid. They find the injured Trivedi and carry him through the same river to the other side. Then Srinivas realizes Trivedi's mistake, and Trivedi understands the tribe's problems. He then signs an approval for the bridge. Finally, the film ends with Lachimi responding positively to Srinivas proposal, and the two embrace.

== Cast ==
- Allari Naresh as Sripada Srinivas
- Anandhi as Lachimi
- Sampath Raj as Arjun Trivedi IAS, the District Collector of East Godavari District
- Ravi Varma Adduri as Inspector Shanmukha Rao
- Vennela Kishore as English Teacher
- Praveen as Babu Garu, A Govt Pune.
- Sritej as Kanda
- Kamakshi Bhaskarla as Pollamma
- Raghu Babu as Koteswara Rao, market yard secretary
- Kumanan Sethuraman as Village Head
- Appaji Ambarisha Darbha as Chief Election Commissioner
- Ravi Prakash as Police SP
- Khayyum as Police Officer
- Keshav Deepak as DSP
- Gemini Suresh as Election Officer
- Shani Salmon

== Soundtrack ==
Itlu Maredumilli Prajaneekam

Soundtrack album by Sricharan Pakala
- Released: 2022
- Recorded: 2021–2022
- Genre: Feature film soundtrack
- Language: Telugu
- Label: Zee Music Company
- Producer: Sricharan Pakala

Sricharan Pakala chronology
Major (2022)	Itlu Maredumilli Prajaneekam (2022)	Ugram (2023)

All music is composed by Sricharan Pakala.

Track list
No.	Title	Lyrics	Singer(s)	Length
1.	"Lachchimi"	Sri Mani	Javed Ali	3:46
2.	"Kolo Kolo Koyilaa"	Kasarla Shyam	Javed Ali, Mohana Bhogaraju, Yamini Ghantasala	3:36

== Release ==
=== Theatrical ===
Itlu Maredumilli Prajaneekam was released on 25 November 2022.

=== Home media ===
Zee Telugu and ZEE5 have acquired the film's satellite and digital streaming rights respectively. It premiered on ZEE5 on 23 December 2022.

== Reception ==
The Times of India stated that the film is "an honest social drama narrating the plight of a tribal village", giving the same rating.
