= Yogie =

Indian film director

- Occupation: Director
- Years active: 2003–present

Yogesh 'Yogie' Krishna Chandra Maganti (born 6 September 1973) is an Indian director who works in Telugu film industry.

== Career ==
Yogesh worked as an assistant director to Uppalapati Narayana Rao for Theerpu (1993) before directing Oka Raju Oka Rani (2003) and Chintakayala Ravi (2008). He supervised the direction of Toofan (2013).

== Filmography ==
- Oka Raju Oka Rani (2003)
- Chintakayala Ravi (2008)
- Jadoogadu (2015)
