= Eedu Gold Ehe =

Eedu Golde
- Theatrical release poster
- Directed by: Veeru Potla
- Written by: Veeru Potla
- Story by: Veeru Potla
- Produced by: Ramabrahmam Sunkara
- Starring: Sunil; Sushma Raj; Richa Panai
- Cinematography: Devraj
- Edited by: Marthand K. Venkatesh
- Music by: Mahati Swara Sagar
- Release date: 7 October 2016
- Country: India
- Language: Telugu

Eedu Gold Ehe is a 2016 Telugu comedy thriller film directed by Veeru Potla starring Sunil, Sushma Raj, and Richa Panai in lead roles. It was produced by Ramabrahmam Sunkara, under AK Entertainments, while Mahati Swara Sagar scored the music. The movie was based on Jewel Thief.

== Plot ==
Bangarraju is an innocent and good-hearted person who goes from Vijayawada to Hyderabad in search of a job. He lands in trouble because of a lookalike who robs a diamond-studded idol from a mafia don's house, the film runs with bangararaju search for his look alike as the mafia don is now attacking everyone who is close to bangararaju finally kidnapping bangararaju's mother for which bangararaju shows the don's son who got fight down by bangararaju and here bargains for freeing bangararaju's mother.it was bangararaju's brother who plotted with bangaraju's head morphed in place of bangararaju for cctv video recording that made everybody believe that bangararaju stole the gold idols worth 900crore from the big don.at the end bangararaju fights down all the opponents.

== Cast ==
- Sunil as Bangarraju
- Sushma Raj as Geeta
- Richa Panai as Sanjana
- Naresh as Buchchaiah Chowdary
- Jayasudha
- Puneet Issar as Mahadev
- Posani Krishna Murali
- Raja Ravindra
- Banerjee
- Aravind Krishnan as Sahadev
- Prudhviraj as Narada
- Vennela Kishore as D R Vaas alias Doorvas, Railway TC
- Prabhas Sreenu
- Ananth Babu
- Shatru
- Shakalaka Shankar as Ranga
- Sattenna as Narada's servant
- Master Bharath as Gopal
- Sudharshan

== Soundtrack ==
The music was composed by Mahati Swara Sagar and released by Aditya Music.

Eedu Gold Ehe

Soundtrack album by Saagar Mahati
- Released: 21 September 2016
- Recorded: 2016
- Genre: Soundtrack
- Length: 15:19
- Label: Aditya Music
- Producer: Mahati Swara Sagar

Saagar Mahati chronology
Jadoogadu (2015)	Eedu Gold Ehe (2016)	Chalo (2018)

All music is composed by Mahati Swara Sagar.

Track list
No.	Title	Lyrics	Singer(s)	Length
1.	"Kopaalenduku Babai"	Veeru Potla	Vijay Prakash, Ramya Behara	3:57
2.	"Geetha"	Balaji	Narendra, Uma Neha	3:53
3.	"Preme Kavalandi"	Balaji	Haricharan, Divya Divakar	3:47
4.	"Mecanos Gold"	Balaji	Yazin Nizar, Roll Rida, Ramya Behara, Ramya NSK	3:42
Total length:				15:19

== Reception ==
=== Critical response ===
J Deepthi Nandan Reddy from The New Indian Express wrote "Director Veeru Potla is known for racy screenplays and he showed that yet again with Eedu Gold Ehe. However, in his attempt to add pace to the movie, a lot of emotions got drowned and the impact wasn’t felt". A reviewer from Samayam says "How he comes out of this forms the crux of the story which is narrated in an entertaining way through out". A reviewer from 123 Telugu wrote "The big minus is that the movie comes with good commercial elements like the above mentioned twists, interval bang, climax episode, comedy tracks which are not related to the story but there is nothing to impress at that level elsewhere. In a word.. Time passes, twists are good, but not at the level of 'this movie is gold ehe'".
