= Mahati Swara Sagar =

Indian music composer

- Born: 15 October; India
- Occupations: Vocalist; film scorer; programmer
- Instruments: Vocals; Keyboard
- Years active: 2015–present
- Labels: Aditya Music, Lahari Music, Divo
- Spouse: Sanjana Kalmanje (m. 2021)

Yanamandra Mahati Swara Sagar is an Indian composer and singer who predominantly works in Telugu cinema. Sagar has debuted as a composer with Jadoogadu (2015). His notable compositions include Chalo (2018), Bheeshma (2020) and Macherla Niyojakavargam (2022), with the former being his breakthrough.

== Early life and career ==
Mahati Swara Sagar was born to Mani Sharma and Srivani Varma in a Telugu family in India. Before debuting as a music composer, Sagar has worked as a keyboard player and programmer in more than 160 films, with majority of the films composed by his father Mani Sharma, M. M. Keeravani and Kalyani Malik. He has debuted as the composer with the 2015 film Jadoogadu.

== Discography ==
=== As composer ===
- All productions are in Telugu, unless otherwise noted

List of original soundtracks and scores
Year	Title	Score	Songs	Notes
2015	Jadoogadu	Yes	Yes	
2016	Eedu Gold Ehe	Yes	Yes	
2018	Kumari 21F	Yes	Yes	Kannada film
2018	Chalo	Yes	Yes	
2018	Nartanasala	Yes	Yes	
2020	Bheeshma	Yes	Yes	
2021	Ishq	Yes	Yes	
2021	Maestro	Yes	Yes	
2022	Kinnerasani	Yes	Yes	
2022	Macherla Niyojakavargam	Yes	Yes	
2022	Krishna Vrinda Vihari	Yes	Yes	
2022	Swathi Muthyam	Yes	Yes	
2023	Vairam	Yes	Yes	Also shot in Kannada
2023	Nenu Student Sir	Yes	Yes	
2023	Paayum Oli Nee Yenakku	No	Yes	Tamil film; credited as Sagar
2023	Bhola Shankar	Yes	Yes	
2024	Prathinidhi 2	Yes	Yes	
2024	Rakshana	Yes	Yes	
2025	Touch Me Not	Yes	Yes	Television series

=== As playback singer ===
Year	Work	Song	Composer	Co-artist(s)	Notes
2018	Chalo	"Choosi Chudangane"	Himself	Anurag Kulkarni	
2018	Kumari 21F	"Lets Party in Bangkok"	Himself	Roll Rida	Kannada song
2018	Nartanasala	"Egireney Manasu"	Himself	Sameera Bharadwaj	
2022	Bhola Shankar	"Bholaa Mania"	Himself	L. V. Revanth	
2022	Bhola Shankar	"Milky Beauty"	Himself	Vijay Prakash, Sanjana Kalmanje	
2022	Swathi Muthyam	"Po Pove Dhoorama"	Himself	Dinker Kalvala, Shruthika Samudhrala	
2023	Nenu Student Sir	"Maaye Maaye"	Himself	Kapil Kapilan	
2023	Nenu Student Sir	"24/7 Okate Dhyaasa"	Himself	Benny Dayal	

== Personal life ==
Mahathi Swara Sagar is married to singer Sanjana Kalmanje. The engagement and wedding ceremonies were held in October 2021 in Hyderabad and Chennai respectively.

== Awards and nominations ==
Year	Awards	Category	Work	Result	Ref.
2021	9th South Indian International Movie Awards	Best Music Director – Telugu	Bheeshma	Nominated	
