= Oka Raju Oka Rani =

- Theatrical release poster
- Directed by: Yogi
- Written by: Yogi
- Produced by: Ramoji Rao
- Starring: Ravi Teja; Namitha
- Cinematography: Vasu
- Edited by: A. Sreekar Prasad
- Music by: Chakri
- Production company: Ushakiran Movies
- Release date: 19 June 2003
- Running time: 150 minutes
- Country: India
- Language: Telugu

Oka Raju Oka Rani (transl. A king, a queen) is a 2003 Indian Telugu-language romantic comedy film directed by newcomer Yogi. The film features Ravi Teja and Namitha in the lead roles. Music has been composed by Chakri. The movie was released on 19 June 2003.

== Cast ==
- Ravi Teja as Ravi
- Namitha as Preethi
- Sobhan as Hanumanthu
- Tanikella Bharani as Raghava, Preethi's father
- Suhasini Maniratnam as Snehalatha, Preethi's mother
- Brahmanandam as Sachin
- Sunil as Sunil
- M S Narayana as Narayana
- Dharmavarapu Subramanyam as Subramanyam
- Ali as Mimicry Bullebbayyi
- Giri Babu as Rama Chandra Murthy
- Chandra Mohan as Chandram, Ravi's father
- Sudha as Amrtuham, Ravi's mother
- Telangana Sakunthala as Shakunthala, Jailor
- Shankar Melkote as Mr. Melkote
- Ramaprabha
- Sathyapriya
- Banerjee
- Srinivasa Reddy as Ravi's friend
- Harshit Dyaga as Ravi's friend
- Pratyusha Cheruvella as Ravi's Friend
- Jaswanth as Ravi's Friend
- Omkar Jajula as Ravi's Friend

== Production ==
Director Sobhan debuted as an actor with this film. The film is inspired by Poovellam Kettuppar (1999). A.S. Prakash debuted as an art director with this film.

== Soundtrack ==
The soundtrack is composed by Chakri and lyrics are written by Trivikram Srinivas. In an audio review, a writer from The Hindu said that "The album, Oka Raju Oka Rani, certainly deserves more than just one hearing".

Oka Raju Oka Rani

Soundtrack album by Chakri
- Released: 10 May 2003
- Genre: Film soundtrack
- Label: Mayuri Music
- Producer: Ramoji Rao

Track list
No.	Title	Artist(s)	Length
1.	"Swarala Veenalona"	Chakri
2.	"Vennele"	Chakri, Kousalya
3.	"Kalalukantaanu Neneevela"	Kousalya
4.	"Mannutine Chinatanam"	Udit Narayan, Kousalya
5.	"Nidurinche Raathilo"	Mathin, Kousalya
6.	"Naa Praanam Naa Gaanam"	Chakri

== Reception ==
Jeevi of Idlebrain.com gave the film a rating of three out of five and said that "The film is good in the first half of the second half. However, the climax scene of Ravi Teja convincing Tanikella Bharani about their love is unconvincing". Gudipoodi Srihari of The Hindu opined that "Raviteja has a couple of handicaps — his hastiness in diction, sans improvement over these three or four successful films, and a typical style of domination over the fairer sex, keeping himself in a commanding position. Hence, the film lacks in aesthetics essential for a love story".
