= Chintakayala Ravi =

- Movie Poster
- Directed by: Yogi
- Written by: Kona Venkat
- Produced by: Nallamalapu Srinivas (Bujji)
- Starring: Venkatesh; Anushka Shetty; Mamta Mohandas
- Cinematography: K. Ravindra Babu
- Edited by: A. Sreekar Prasad
- Music by: Songs: Vishal–Shekhar; Background Score: Mani Sharma
- Production company: Lakshmi Narasimha Productions
- Release date: 2 October 2008
- Running time: 152 minutes
- Country: India
- Language: Telugu

Chintakayala Ravi is a 2008 Telugu-language romantic comedy film produced by Nallamalupu Bujji and directed by Yogi. It stars Venkatesh, Anushka Shetty and Mamta Mohandas in lead roles, while Venu Thottempudi in a supporting role, with songs composed by Vishal–Shekhar and background score composed by Mani Sharma.

== Plot ==
Chintakayala Ravi (Venkatesh) works in a bar named Cyber Wave in New York. He is the head waiter; he works with his three friends who also are waiters at the same bar. He has a soft spot for software engineers because he came to the US with the dream of becoming a software pro. However, unavoidable circumstances prevented him from reaching that goal.

His mother Seshamamba (Lakshmi) tells everybody in her village in Andhra Pradesh that her son is an outstanding software engineer in America. Ravi is hit hard with a sentiment; for the sole reason of not wanting to hurt his mother's feelings, he continues to tell her the sweet lie that he truly is a software engineer in America.

However, problems arise when Seshamamba gets ready to marry her son to Lavanya (Mamta Mohandas), a local village girl because Lavanya believes Seshamamba when she says that Ravi is a software engineer. So, when Lavanya asks her childhood buddy, Sunitha (Anushka), to enquire about Ravi, the truth comes out that he's a bar waiter. Her family gets angry on knowing that Ravi's family lied to them, and when Ravi arrives in the village for betrothal, he is subjected to humiliation. What happens later forms the remaining story.

He troubles Sunitha because she had got her information wrong about Ravi. Later, she understood how good a person Ravi is when he saves her father. Throughout the movie, Ravi and Sunitha become good friends and Ravi plans to find a guy for Sunitha to marry. She aims to rejoin Ravi & Lavanya, but it doesn't work out. Ravi had saved Srikanth's (Venu Thottempudi) life while he was in America. Srikanth comes to Lavanya's home and tries to convince her parents, explaining how good a person Ravi is. As Srikanth joins hands with Lavanya's parents about Ravi's marriage with Lavanya, Ravi and Sunitha fall in love with each other, which isn't known until the time of Ravi's marriage with Lavanya. On knowing the truth, Ravi's family ends up getting him married to Sunitha.

== Cast ==
- Venkatesh as Chintakayala Ravi
- Anushka Shetty as Sunitha
- Mamta Mohandas as Mavidikayala Lavanya
- Lakshmi as Chintakayala Seshamamba
- Shayaji Shinde as Mavidikayala Ramachandra Rao
- Giri Babu as Rama Chandra Murthy
- Chandra Mohan as Chintakayala Govinda Rao
- Brahmanandam as Pinky
- Sunil as Pendurthi Babu
- Ali as Nachimi
- Dharmavarapu Subramanyam as Venky Doors / Duwaram Venteswarulu
- M. S. Narayana as Anjineyalu
- Venu Madhav as Sai
- Chalapathi Rao as Krishnam Raju, Sunitha's father
- Raghu Babu as Krishna Reddy
- Ajay as Ajay
- Ravi Prakash as Karthik
- Srinivasa Reddy as Giri
- Satyam Rajesh as Devudu
- Bandla Ganesh as Bhaskar
- Venu Thottempudi as Srikanth
- Nikita Thukral as Pooja / Poo
- Master Bharat Kumar as Bharath, Anjineyalu's son
- Pragathi as Lavanya's mother
- Pradeep Shakthi as Srinivasulu, Lavanya's uncle
- Samir Kochhar in a cameo appearance
- Rajendra as Sarath
- Srilalitha as Srivalli
- Rajitha as Swarajya Lakshmi
- Anitha Nath
- Vijaya Madhavi
- Prakash Raj as Narrator
- Rajiv Kanakala as Sunitha's to-be groom (cameo)
- Aarti Chhabria as item number
- N.T. Rama Rao Jr. guest appearance in song "Shava Shava Bhalle Bhalle"

== Soundtrack ==
Chintakayala Ravi

Soundtrack album by Vishal–Shekhar
- Released: 2008
- Genre: Soundtrack
- Length: 28:24
- Label: Aditya Music
- Producer: Vishal–Shekhar

Vishal–Shekhar chronology
Tashan (2008)	Chintakayala Ravi (2008)	Bachna Ae Haseeno (2008)

Music was composed by Vishal–Shekhar. Lyrics written by Chandrabose. Music released on Aditya Music.

No.	Title	Singer(s)	Length
1.	"Bagundey Bagundey"	Vijay Prakash, Hamsika Iyer	5:21
2.	"Oh Sunitha"	Shankar Mahadevan	3:46
3.	"Shava Shava Bhalle Bhalle"	Shankar Mahadevan, Mahalakshmi Iyer	4:15
4.	"Merupula"	Rajesh, Shreya Ghoshal	4:50
5.	"Enduko"	Sonu Nigam, Mahalakshmi Iyer	4:44
6.	"Valla Valla"	KK, Sunidhi Chauhan	5:17
Total length:			28:24

== Reception ==
Radhika Rajmani of Rediff.com called it a "proper commercial family entertainer" and praised Venkatesh's performance.

== Awards and nominations ==
Filmfare Awards South Nominations

- Best Music Director – Telugu – Vishal–Shekhar
- Best Female Playback Singer – Telugu – Shreya Ghoshal – "Merupulaa"
- Best Lyricist – Telugu – Chandrabose – "Enduko"
