= Sri Mani =

Telugu Cinema Lyricist

Shreemani
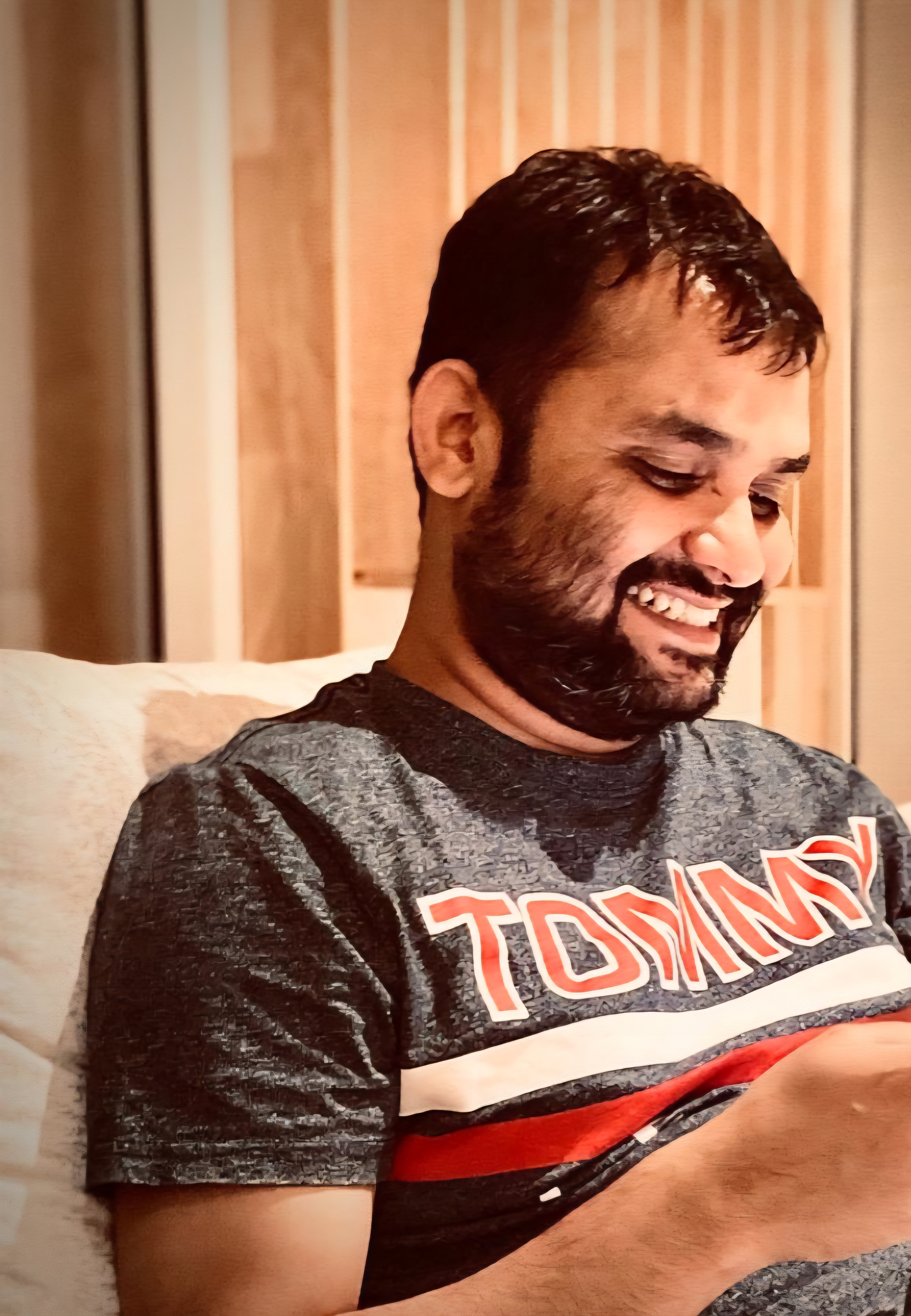

Background information
- Born: 15 September 1988 (age 38); Chirala, Andhra Pradesh, India
- Occupation: Lyricist
- Years active: 2011–present

Shreemani (born 15 September 1988), also known as Sri Mani, is an Indian lyricist well known for his works in Telugu cinema and his unique style of lyrics. He won Filmfare Award for Best Lyricist – Telugu for the film Attarintiki Daredi, penning the song "Aaradugula Bullet".

== Early life ==
Shreemani's parents died during his young age and he was raised by his grandparents Koniki Dathatreyulu and Koniki Ramanamma. Since the age of 8, he developed an interest in poetry and writing.

== Career ==
During his days of bachelor's degree, his grandfather died, which planted a thought of his own employment and career. He moved then to Hyderabad for the job of a lyricist, after a lot of struggles director Sukumar gave him the first chance to write lyrics for a song in his film 100% Love and later on he shot to fame for his lyrics in Sega, which gave him good fame and name the great and legendary singer Padma Shri and Padma Bhushan SPBalasubramaniyam gave compliments to him for Varsham Munduga song in Sega in Padutha Theeyagaa program, which telecasts in Eenadu TV, leading him to Trivikram Srinivas to give him a chance in Julai, Attarintiki Daaredi, S/O Sathyamurthy and more.

In an interview with All India Radio, Shreemani mentioned that Varsham movie songs attracted him so much especially "Ee Varsham Sakshiga". After this he discovered Sirivennela Seetharama Sastry and his work. After listening to his song "Niggadeesi Adugu" from Gaayam, he decided to become writer.

He used to say the most memorable moment is when he got compliments for the lyrics in 100% Love from Devi Sri Prasad and Sukumar. He told never once sat down seriously with an intention to write, and his songs always used to happen spontaneously while travelling, working, with a few friends or on the move which he records in his phone immediately.

== Discography ==
Year	Album	Composer	Songs	Notes
2011	100% Love	Devi Sri Prasad	A Square B Square (Male Version), A Square B Square (Female Version), Aho Balu, That is Mahalakshmi	
2011	Sega	Joshua Sridhar	Oka Devatha, Padam Vidichi, Rani, Varsham Munduga	Telugu Dubbed Version of Veppam
2011	Pilla Zamindar	V. Selvaganesh	Haiyayo	
2011	Bodyguard	S. Thaman	Yevvaro	
2012	Nuvva Nena	Bheems	Oy Pilla	
2012	Love Failure	S. Thaman	Happy Heart Attack, Inthajare Inthajare, Melukora Melukora, Parvathi Parvathi	
2012	Vennela 1 1/2	Sunil Kashyap	Dhin Chik, Prema Gola Gola, Monalisa Monalisa	
2012	Endukante... Premanta!	G. V. Prakash Kumar	Cinderella	
2012	Julai	Devi Sri Prasad	Chakkani Bike Undhi, Mee Intiki Mundhu, Osey Osey	
2012	Race	Vivek Sagar & Sanjay	Prapanchame, Yammayo	
2012	Sarocharu	Devi Sri Prasad	Rachcha Rambola	
2013	Sukumarudu	Anoop Rubens	Neelakasamlo, O Baby Naa Lokam	
2013	Pelli Pusthakam	Sekhar Chandra	Chali Chali Ee Vedi	
2013	DK Bose	Achu	Maula Maula, Mr. D.K. Bose	
2013	Mandodari	Chinni Charan	Noota Enabai	
2013	Adda	Anoop Rubens	Enduke Enduke, Ninne Ninne Chusthunte	
2013	Kevvu Keka	Bheems	Modhal Modhal	
2013	Yevadu	Devi Sri Prasad	Oye Oye, Cheliya Cheliya	
2013	Atharintiki Daaredi	Devi Sri Prasad	Aaradugula Bullet	
2013	Ramayya Vasthavayya	S. Thaman	Pandaga Chesko, Kurrayeedu, Idhi Ranarangam	
2013	Doosukeltha	Mani Sharma	Modati Saari, Soodimande, Tandavamade Sivudae	
2014	Aagadu	S. Thaman	Aagadu	
2014	Run Raja Run	Ghibran	Bujjiamma Bujjiamma	
2014	Paathshala	Rahul Raj	All songs	
2014	Loukyam	Anoop Rubens	Pink Lips	
2014	Oka Laila Kosam	Anoop Rubens	O Meri jane jana	
2014	Brother of Bommali	Shekar Chandra		
2015	S/O Satyamurthy	Devi Sri Prasad	Jaaruko, Seethakaalam	
2015	Kumari 21F	Devi Sri Prasad	Meghalu Lekunna	
2015	Sher	S. Thaman	Rama Rama, Suragani, Chal Chalona	
2015	Bhale Bhale Magadivoy	Gopi Sunder	Hello Hello	
2015	Bruce Lee – The Fighter	S. Thaman	Run	
2015	Bengal Tiger	Bheems Ceciroleo	Chupulato	
2016	Oka Ammai Tappa	Mickey J Meyer	Yegireney Yegireney	
2016	Babu Bangaram	Ghibran	Dhillunna Vade, Snehithudo	
2016	Sarrainodu	S. Thaman	Telusaa Telusaa	
2016	Srirastu Subhamastu	S. Thaman	Anu Anu	
2016	Ekkadiki Pothavu Chinnavada	Shekar Chandra	Chirunaama thana chirunaamaaaa	
2017	Khaidi No. 150	Devi Sri Prasad	You & Me, Sundari	
2017	Shatamanam Bhavati	Mickey J. Meyer	Mellaga Tellarindoila	
2017	Winner	S. Thaman	"Pichonne Airpoya"	
2017	Nenu Local	Devi Sri Prasad	Arere Yekadda, Side Please, Champesaave Nannu, Disturb Chestha Ninnu	
2017	Rarandoi Veduka Chudham	Devi Sri Prasad	Thakita Thakajham, Bhramaramba Ki Nachesanu, Nee Vente Nenunte	
2017	Vunnadhi Okate Zindagi	Devi Sri Prasad	Rayyi Rayyi Mantu	
2017	Jaya Janaki Nayaka	Devi Sri Prasad	Let's Party All Night, Rangu Rangu Kallajodu, Just Chill Boss, Veede Veede, A For Apple	
2017	MCA	Devi Sri Prasad	Kotha Kothaga, Family Party, Yemaindho Teliyadhu Naaku	
2017	Aaradugula Bullet	Mani Sharma	All Songs	
2017	Agnyaathavaasi	Anirudh Ravichander	Baitikochi Chuste, Dhaga Dhagamaney, AB Yevvaro née Baby	
2018	Ego	Sai Karthik		
2018	Tholi Prema	S. Thaman	All songs	
2018	Lover	Sai Kartheek	All Songs; Note: Two songs "Anthe Kadha Mari" and "Yevaipuga Naa Choopu Saagali" penned along with Sirivennela Seetharama Sastry	
2018	Srinivasa Kalyanam	Mickey J. Meyer	"Kalyanam Vaibhogam","Ekkada Nuvvunte","Ithadena Ithadena","Something Something","Vinavamma Toorupu Chukka", "Kalyanam Vaibhogam (Climax Version)"	
2018	Geetha Govindam	Gopi Sundar	"What the Life", "Yenti Yenti", "Vachindamma"	
2019	Vinaya Vidheya Rama	Devi Sri Prasad	"Thandane Thandane", "Thassadiyya", "Ek Baar", "Rama Loves Sita"	
2019	F2 – Fun and Frustration	Devi Sri Prasad	"Entho Fun", "Honey is the Best"	
2019	Mr. Majnu	S. Thaman	All songs	
2019	Maharshi	Devi Sri Prasad	All songs	
2019	Raagala 24 Gantallo	Raghu Kunche	"Rebba", "Nee Chiru Navvuki Namo"	
2020	Sarileru Neekevvaru	Devi Sri Prasad	"Mind Block", "He's So Cute"	
2020	Ksheera Sagara Madhanam	Ajay Arasada	"Nee Peru"	
2021	Uppena	Devi Sri Prasad	"Nee Kallu Neeli Samudram", "Jala jala Patham", "Ranguladdukunna"	
2021	Alludu Adhurs	Devi Sri Prasad	"Hola Chica", "Nandhila Nandhila", "Ramba Oorvasi Menaka"	
2021	Naandhi	Sricharan Pakala	"Cheli"	
2021	Rang De	Devi Sri Prasad	All Songs	
2021	Ishq	Mahati Swara Sagar	All Songs	
2021	Ninnila Ninnila	Rajesh Murugesan	All Songs	
2021	Lol Salaam	Ajay Arasada	"LOL Salaam"	web series
2021	Most Eligible Bachelor	Gopi Sundar	"Guche Gulabi", "Leharaayi"	
2022	Rowdy Boys	Devi Sri Prasad	"Preme Aakasamaithe", "Vesane O Nicchena", "Nuvve Na Dhairyam" (along with Ananta Sriram)	
2022	Saamanyudu	Yuvan Shankar Raja	"Matthikinche Kalley"	
2022	Khiladi	Devi Sri Prasad	"Istam", "Khiladi Title Song", "Atta Sudake", "Full Kick", "Catch Me"	
2022	Aadavallu Meeku Johaarlu	Devi Sri Prasad	"Aadavallu Meeku Johaarlu"	
2022	The Warriorr	Devi Sri Prasad	"Dhada Dhada"	
2022	Highway	Simon K. King	"Oohicha Ledhu Kadhe"	
2022	Itlu Maredumilli Prajaneekam	Sricharan Pakala	"Lachchimi"	
2022	18 Pages	Gopi Sundar	All Songs	
2023	Shaakuntalam	Mani Sharma	Along with Chaitanya Prasad	
2023	Dasara	Santhosh Narayanan	"Ori Vaari"	
2023	Samajavaragamana	Gopi Sundar	"Choti Choti", "Hola Re Hola", "What to do"	
2024	Tiragabadara Saami	Jeevan Babu (JB)	"Oka Poola Meghamey", "Chaala Bagunde"	
2024	Indian 2 (D)	Anirudh Ravichander	"Come Back Indian"	
2024	Lucky Baskhar	G. V. Prakash Kumar	"Srimathi Garu", "Nijamaa Kalaa"	
2024	Aay	Ram Miriyala	"Sufiyana"	
2025	Thandel	Devi Sri Prasad	"Hilesso Hilessa"	
2025	Sri Sri Sri Raja Vaaru	Kailas Menon	All Songs	
2025	Junior	Devi Sri Prasad	"Let's Live This Moment"	
2025	Santhana Prapthirasthu	Ajay Arasada	"Telusa Nee Kosame"	
2025	Patang	Jose Jimmy	"Hey Hello Namasthe", "Andala Tarakasi", "Emosanal Drama", "Tai Tai Tai"	
2025	Dhandoraa	Mark K Robin	"Parichayam Avakunda"	
2026	Gaayapadda Simham	Sweekar Agasthi	"Bride Song"	
