= Paayum Oli Nee Yenakku =

2023 film

- Theatrical release poster
- Directed by: Karthik Adwait
- Written by: Karthik Adwait
- Produced by: Karthik Adwait
- Dialogue by: Dilsuyan J
- Starring: Vikram Prabhu; Vani Bhojan; Dhananjaya; Vela Ramamoorthy
- Cinematography: Sridhar
- Edited by: C. S. Prem Kumar
- Music by: Score; Sunny–Saketh; Songs; Sagar
- Production company: Karthik Movie House
- Distributed by: SP Cinemas
- Release date: 23 June 2023
- Country: India
- Language: Tamil

Paayum Oli Nee Yenakku (transl. You are my beaming light) is a 2023 Indian Tamil-language action thriller film written, produced, and directed by Karthik Adwait. The film stars Vikram Prabhu and Vani Bhojan. It was released on 23 June 2023, to mixed reviews from critics.

== Plot ==
Aravind (Vikram Prabhu) suffers from partial low-light blindness following an accident in his childhood. He runs a software company that helps protect sensitive data from cyberthreats and illegal hacking. Arvind happens to meet Uthra (Vani Bhojan), a wedding planner, who helps organise his sister's wedding. The two start getting along well and even express their love for each other. Things take a turn when Arvind's father, his only source of strength, gets killed by a group. He now embarks on a dangerous journey to find the reason behind his father's murder, and unravels some shocking truth that involves many big shots, including Jeevan (Dhanajaya), who was once the right hand of an influential politician.

== Cast ==
- Vikram Prabhu as Aravind
- Vani Bhojan as Uthra
- Dhananjaya as Jeevan
- Anand
- Vela Ramamoorthy as Aanamalaiyar
- Vivek Prasanna
- Jeeva Ravi
- Vettai Muthukumar

== Production ==
The project was announced by newcomer Karthik Adwait as his debut directorial venture. In 2020, Vikram Prabhu signed the film after the success of Vaanam Kottattum. In April 2020, Vani Bhojan was signed in as the female lead. Kannada actor Dhananjaya (in his Tamil debut) was also signed to play a crucial role in this film. Filming wrapped in April 2021.

== Music ==
The original background score is composed by Sunny-Saketh. The songs are composed by Sagar. The first single "Anicha Poove" was released on 9 June 2022.

All music is composed by Sagar.

Track listing
No.	Title	Lyrics	Singer(s)	Length
1.	"Anicha Poove"	Karthik Netha	Sanjana Kalmanje	3:29
2.	"Hey Papa"	Ku Karthik	Kapil Kapilan
Total length:				3:29

== Reception ==
Logesh Balachandran of The Times of India gave the film 2 out of 5 stars and wrote, "The promising initial set-up makes us believe that we are in for an intense thriller, but within half-an-hour into the film, things fall apart." A critic from Dinamalar gave the film a rating of 2.25 out of 5.
