= Swathi Muthyam (2022 film) =

- Theatrical release poster
- Directed by: Lakshman K. Krishna
- Written by: S. V. Raghav Reddy (Dialogues)
- Screenplay by: Lakshman K. Krishna
- Produced by: Suryadevara Naga Vamsi
- Starring: Bellamkonda Ganesh; Varsha Bollamma
- Cinematography: Suryaa
- Edited by: Naveen Nooli
- Music by: Mahati Swara Sagar
- Production companies: Sithara Entertainments; Fortune Four Cinemas
- Release date: 5 October 2022
- Running time: 114 minutes
- Country: India
- Language: Telugu

Swathi Muthyam (transl. White pearl) is a 2022 Indian Telugu-language comedy drama film written and directed by Lakshman K. Krishna. Produced by Suryadevara Naga Vamsi, the film stars Bellamkonda Ganesh (in his debut) and Varsha Bollamma. The film revolves around dramatic life of an innocent boy, Bala.

== Plot ==
A young man, Bala Murali Krishna works as a government employee. He is innocent and pure at heart. His family starts searching a bride for him. One of those matches is Bhagyalakshmi aka Bhagi (Varsha). They meet in a coffee shop. She tells that she needs some time to decide about their marriage. They decided to meet frequently to better understand each other. Soon, they fall in love and Bhagi agrees to marry Bala.

On the day of his marriage Bala gets a phone call from his office. He is shocked to see Sailaja (Divya) at his office. It is revealed that Bala donated his sperm for an illegal surrogacy for a lady in Dubai few months back. Sailaja is the one who carried surrogacy and gave birth to a baby. She informs him that the lady died and no one is responding to her.

Bala invites her to his marriage and promised to settle down the matter later. She overhears a conversation between Bala and his friend Bucchi Babu on how to handle the surrogacy matter. She misunderstands Bala and leaves the marriage leaving the baby with Bala. Everyone at marriage thinks that the Bala is the father of the baby, and he had an affair with Sailaja. He tries to persuade the elders on what happened, but nobody listens. As a result, his marriage is cancelled. He takes care of that baby. Bhagi learns that surrogacy issue and understands that Bala is innocent. Her parents find another match for her. She goes to hospital to do female sterilization (surgical procedure to prevent pregnancy permanently). Upon knowing this Bala comes to the hospital. Bucchi Babu and Sailaja also come to their rescue to clear the misunderstandings between Bala and his family.

Finally Bala and Bhagi's families understand their love and his innocence and agree to their marriage and both decides to take care of baby.

== Cast ==
- Bellamkonda Ganesh as Bala Murali Krishna
- Varsha Bollamma as Bhagyalakshmi "Bhagi"
- Divya Sripada as Sailaja
- Vennela Kishore as R.M.P Bucchi Babu, Bala's best friend
- Rao Ramesh as Venkatrao, Bala's father
- Pragathi as Bala's mother
- Naresh as Hanumantha Rao, Bhagi's father
- Surekha Vani as Bhagi's mother
- Goparaju Ramana as Bhagi's uncle
- Subbaraju as Bala's office EO
- Harshavardhan as Dr. Daiva Prasad
- Sivannarayana Naripeddi as Daniel, Bala's colleague
- Bindu as Srilakshmi, Bala's colleague
- Pammi Sai as Govindam, Bala's assistant
- Sunaina as Bucchi Babu's wife
- Pawan Bolisetty as Vasu, Bala's brother
- Ananth Babu as marriage broker
- Rajitha as gynaecologist
- Viva Raghav as Bala's friend
- Satish Saripalli

== Production ==
Principal photography was completed in 60 days, with filming taking place in Pithapuram, Kakinada, and Hyderabad.

== Release and reception ==
The film was initially scheduled to release on 13 August 2022.

A critic from The Times of India wrote that the film "relies heavily on its situational humour but fails to engage midway because of its thin plot. Nevertheless, give it a try for its humour".

Eenadu critic appreciated the story and performances while criticizing the direction and execution. On the technical aspects, Thummala Mohan of Samayam Telugu wrote, " the songs by Mahati Swara Sagar's music are okay. Background music is good. Surya's cinematography is good [sic]."

=== Home media ===
Aha acquired the streaming rights of film right after the theatrical release and made it available for streaming on 24 October 2022.
