= Jadoogadu =

- Directed by: Yogie
- Written by: P. Madhusudhan
- Produced by: V. V. N. Prasad
- Starring: Naga Shourya; Sonarika Bhadoria; Ashish Vidyarthi; Ajay
- Cinematography: Sai Sriram
- Edited by: M. R. Varma
- Music by: Mahati Swara Sagar
- Production company: Sathyaa Entertainments
- Release date: 26 June 2015
- Country: India
- Language: Telugu

Jadoogadu (English: Magician) is a 2015 Indian Telugu action comedy film directed by Yogie and produced by Sathyaa Entertainments. It features Naga Shourya and Sonarika Bhadoria in the lead roles while Ashish Vidyarthi and Ajay appear in supporting roles. The film was released worldwide on 26 June 2015

It recorded as an flop at box office

== Cast ==
- Naga Shourya as Krishna
- Sonarika Bhadoria as Parvathi
- Ashish Vidyarthi
- Ajay as Guntur Seenu
- Zakir Hussain as Srisailam
- Ravi Kale as Selva
- Saptagiri as Puli
- Srinivasa Reddy
- Prudhviraj
- Kota Srinivasa Rao

== Soundtrack ==
Jadoogadu

Soundtrack album by Mahati Swara Sagar
- Released: April 21, 2015
- Genre: Film soundtrack
- Length: 19:24
- Label: Mango Music

Mahati Swara Sagar chronology
Jadoogadu (2015)	Eedu Gold Ehe (2016)

The audio launch of the film was held on 21 April 2015 and it witnessed yesteryear celebs at the venue. The soundtrack of the film was composed by Mahati Swara Sagar. The soundtrack of this movie is produced under the banner of Mango Music.

=== Track listing ===
All music is composed by Mahati Swara Sagar.

No.	Title	Lyrics	Music	Singer(s)	Length
1.	"Jadoogadu (Promotional Song)"	Srimani	Saagar Mahathi	Ramya Behara	2:04
2.	"Gola Cheddame"	Varikuppala Yadagiri	Saagar Mahathi	Sweekar Agasthi, M. M. Manasi	4:30
3.	"ABC ABC"	Srimani	Saagar Mahathi	Vijay Prakash, Ramya Behara	3:58
4.	"Kadha Mudirega"	Viswa	Saagar Mahathi	Kunal Ganjawala	3:54
5.	"Masugudu"	Varikuppala Yadagiri	Saagar Mahathi	Uma Neha	4:28
Total length:					0:19:24

=== Release ===
It released on 26 June 2015.
