= Ishq (2021 film) =

2021 film by S. S. Raju

Ishq: Not a Love Story
- Release poster
- Directed by: S. S. Raju
- Written by: Ratheesh Ravi
- Based on: Ishq by Anuraj Manohar
- Produced by: N. V. Prasad; Paras Jain; Vakada Anjan Kumar
- Starring: Teja Sajja; Priya Prakash Varrier
- Cinematography: Shyam K. Naidu
- Edited by: A. Vara Prasad
- Music by: Mahati Swara Sagar
- Production company: Mega Super Good Films
- Release date: 30 July 2021
- Running time: 115 minutes
- Country: India
- Language: Telugu

Ishq: Not a Love Story is a 2021 Indian Telugu-language romantic thriller film directed by S. S. Raju. Produced by Mega Super Good Films production studio, the film stars Teja Sajja and Priya Prakash Varrier in lead roles. It is the remake of 2019 Malayalam film of the same name. Mahati Swara Sagar has composed the music of the film. The film was released on 30 July 2021.

== Plot ==
The film revolves around the life of a man named Siddharth alias Siddhu and his girlfriend, Anasuya alias Anu.

Siddhu works at an information technology firm and takes time off from work to attend his sister's wedding. While on leave, he and his girlfriend Anu go on a date where they encounter Madhav, sitting in a car with his other friend. They both convince Siddhu that they are police officers and that he and Anu will be arrested if they don't escort them.

Siddhu and Anu are mentally tortured while driving around with them. Madhav tries to make a move on Anu while Siddhu is away. Tired of his actions, his friend leaves the three of them alone. He continues to harass them but leaves after Siddhu pays him off. The two then go to Anu's hostel without speaking. A frustrated Siddhu asks Anu what Madhav has done to her. Upset by his question and the fact that Siddhu did not even ask her how she was after the traumatic episode, she gets out of the car and Siddhu angrily drives back home.

While Siddhu is restless at home, he decides to take revenge. He goes back to the place where he originally met the two men and discovers that Madhav is just an ambulance driver and his friend is just a tailor. Siddhu finds his address and goes to his house while he is away. He is greeted by his wife, Jyothi and his daughter, Shravya. He enters the house and makes a scene. When Madhav arrives home, he and Siddhu get into a fight, with Siddhu breaking Madhav's legs. Siddhu attempts to leave but is stopped by a procession on the road. Siddhu begins to torture his wife and daughter in the same way Madhav tortured him and his girlfriend.

Madhav's friends arrive outside his house. He attempts to call to them for help but stops when Siddhu threatens to kill his daughter. Meanwhile, Jyothi overhears his friends talking about Siddhu's incident. As his friends leave, Jyothi angrily questions Madhav, who confesses that he tried to sexually assault Anu, but she fought back. Siddhu apologizes to Jyothi and leaves the broken family alone. Jyothi takes her daughter inside, while Madhav lies in the room immobilized. A happy and relaxed Siddhu meets Anu that night.

The next day, Anu joins Siddhu at the beach. Still angry at his question, she asks what else he wants to know. He pulls his car over and takes the Madhav's friend out of the trunk. He apologizes to Anu and Siddhu offers him money to get back home. Still angry, Anu asks Siddhu if Madhav had done something to her, would he have abandoned her. Siddhu refuses to reply and changes the topic by proposing to her for her birthday. She turns him down as she does not want to live with Siddhu anymore. She realizes Siddhu might not have accepted her if something bad had happened, regardless of who was at fault or how miserable the situation was.

== Cast ==
- Teja Sajja as Siddharth "Siddhu"
- Priya Prakash Varrier as Anasuya "Anu"
- Ravindra Vijay as Madhav
- Leona Lishoy as Jyothi

== Production ==
Mega Super Good Films announced the film on 8 January 2021 through Twitter. Filming took place in early 2021.

== Soundtrack ==
All music is composed by Mahati Swara Sagar.

Original Soundtrack
No.	Title	Lyrics	Singer(s)	Length
1.	"Aanandam Madike"	Sri Mani	Sid Sriram, Satya Yamini	3:17
2.	"Aagalekapotunna"	Sri Mani	Anurag Kulkarni	2:33
3.	"Cheekati Chirujwaalai"	Sri Mani	Anurag Kulkarni, Uma Neha	2:13

== Release ==
The film was originally scheduled to release on 23 April 2021, but the release was postponed due to the COVID-19 pandemic in India. Later, it was announced that the film will be released on 30 July 2021.

== Reception ==
Neeshita Nyayapati of The Times of India gave a rating of 2.5 out of 5 and cited it as "an odd mix of feminism and misogyny". She felt that the film had the potential to be something more, if only the subject at hand was handled better instead of ending up being nothing but than a case-study on the big, fat, male ego. Sakshi 's Anji Setty rated the film two for five. He criticized the screenplay, narration, and, praised the acting performances done by lead actors.
