= Vennela 1½ =

Vennela 1 1/2
- Theatrical Release Poster
- Directed by: Vennela Kishore
- Written by: Vennela Kishore
- Produced by: Vasu; Varma
- Starring: Chaitanya Krishna; Monal Gajjar; Bramhanandam; Vennela Kishore
- Cinematography: Suresh Bhargav
- Music by: Sunil Kashyap
- Production company: GR8 Films
- Release date: 21 September 2012
- Country: India
- Language: Telugu

Vennela 1 1/2 is a 2012 Telugu-language romantic drama film directed by Vennela Kishore. It is a sequel for the first half of the 2005 film Vennela by Deva Katta. Continuing the charecters of Khader Basha Who after escapes from USA. It stars Chaitanya Krishna, Monal Gajjar, Bramhanandam and Vennela Kishore in the lead. Sunil Kashyap provided the music. It was released on 21 September 2012.

== Plot ==
The story is set in Bangkok. Krishna is a happy go lucky man who falls for Vennela in first sight. However, he learns that she was engaged to someone else, but tries his luck. Vennela too loves him, but realizes that he is a fraud. Rest of the story is about how they work out their differences.

== Cast ==
- Chaitanya Krishna as Krishna Krishna
- Monal Gajjar as Vennela
- Bramhanandam as Papachand
- Vennela Kishore as Khadar Basha
- Sravan as Sravan
- Madhu as Sunil
- Harish as Yuvak
- Raghu Babu
- Venu Yeldandi
- Dhanraj
- Shankar Melkote as Managing director
- Prudhvi Raj
- Sivannarayana Naripeddi
- Master Bharath as Bharath
- Thagubothu Ramesh
- Vajja Venkata Giridhar

== Production ==
While shooting for Orange (2010) in Australia, Vennela Kishore came up with the idea for this film.

== Soundtrack ==
Vennela 1 1/2

Soundtrack album to Vennela 1 1/2 by Sunil Kashyap
- Released: 5 February 2012
- Recorded: 2011–2012
- Genre: Feature film soundtrack
- Language: Telugu
- Label: Aditya Music
- Producer: Sunil Kashyap

Tracklist
No.	Title	Lyrics	Artist(s)	Length
1.	"Rimpochi Rimpochi" (Hero Introduction)	Krishna Chaitanya	Hemachandra
2.	"Dhin Chik" (Hero Following Heroine)	Sri Mani	Hemachandra
3.	"Prema Gola Gola" (Love In A Mess)	Sri Mani	Sunil Kashyap
4.	"Anane Ananu" (Break Up)	Krishna Chaitanya	Sunil Kashyap
5.	"Vennela Vennela" (Love Journey)	Sira Sri	Ranjith
6.	"Rape Chay" (Villian's First Love Song)	Vennela Team	Vennela Kishore, Sunil Kashyap
7.	"Hip Hop Song" (Dance Competition)	Krishna Chaitanya	Hemachandra
8.	"Monalisa Monalisa" (Hero's Quest For Heroine)	Sri Mani	Sunil Kashyap

== Reception ==
The movie opened to negative reviews. Haricharan Pudupeddi of DNA India gave a review stating "Vennela 1 1/2 is loathsome with the senseless 'bathroom humour' that runs throughout the film. Vennela 1 1/2 is one of the worst comedy films of recent times." IBN Live stated "After watching the trailers, most of us did not expect anything more from Vennela 1 1/2 than low brow comedy. What came as a surprise was that the film did not pack a sensible story that might have made us sit through the haranguing second half." The Times Of India gave a review stating "The performances vary from loony to queer. It would be unfair to call it acting. What the characters just indulge in is absolute tom-foolery of degenerated variety. Chaitanya has a presence, but really has nothing much to do as does Monal. Let's just say, the other departments are in tune with the rest of the film." The Hindu gave a review stating "From the Kya Kool Hai Hum clan of film-making, it tries to be like American Pie, but fails miserably. It's just a mindless excuse for a film, filling up the 70 mm. The film is not for those looking for cinema, but for those with raging hormones, looking for a cheap laugh."
