= Kinnerasani (film) =

2022 Indian Telugu-language film by Ramana Teja

- Release poster
- Directed by: Ramana Teja
- Written by: Sai Tej Desharaj
- Produced by: Ram Talluri
- Starring: Kalyaan Dhev; Ann Sheetal; Ravindra Vijay
- Cinematography: Dinesh K. Babu
- Edited by: Anwar Ali
- Music by: Mahati Swara Sagar
- Production companies: SRT Entertainments; Shubham Entertainments
- Distributed by: ZEE5
- Release date: 10 June 2022
- Country: India
- Language: Telugu

Kinnerasani is a 2022 Indian Telugu-language mystery thriller film written and directed by Ramana Teja. Produced by Ram Talluri, the film stars Kalyan Dhev and Ann Sheetal in the lead roles while Ravindra Vijay, Mahati Bikshu play the supporting roles with the music composed by Mahati Swara Sagar. The film was released on 10 June 2022 on ZEE5.

== Plot ==
Jayadev writes a book called Kinnerasani, but somehow Veda finds a book that holds the key to her past, present, and future. Meanwhile, lawyer Venkat wants to avenge his lover’s death.Venkat helps Veda to protect them both from an uncertain future.

== Cast ==
- Kalyaan Dhev as Adv. Venkat
- Ann Sheetal as Vedha
- Ravindra Vijay as Jayadev
- Shriya Tyagi as Parvathi
- Kashish Khan as Vedha
- Mahati Bikshu as Kinnerasani
- Satya Prakash
- Bhanu Chander

== Release ==
The film was premiered on ZEE5 platform on 10 June 2022.

== Reception ==
Thadhagath Pathi of The Times Of India rated the film 2 out of 5 stars and wrote "Kinnerasani doesn’t have anything new to offer, barring a few twists and turns".
