= Nartanasala (2018 film) =

- Film poster
- Directed by: Srinivas Chakravarthi
- Written by: Srinivas Chakravarthi
- Produced by: Usha Mulpuri
- Starring: Naga Shourya; Kashmira Pardeshi; Yamini Bhaskar
- Cinematography: Vijay C. Kumar
- Edited by: Kotagiri Venkateswara Rao
- Music by: Mahati Swara Sagar
- Production company: Ira Creations
- Release date: 30 August 2018
- Country: India
- Language: Telugu

Nartanasala (stylized as @Nartanasala) is a 2018 Indian Telugu-language romantic comedy film written and directed by debutant Srinivas Chakravarthi. The film was produced by Usha Mulpuri on Ira Creations banner which featured Naga Shourya and newcomer Kashmira Pardeshi and Yamini Bhaskar in the lead.

Mahati Swara Sagar composed the soundtrack and the background score for the film while Vijay C Kumar provided the cinematography and Kotagiri Venkateswara Rao did the editing for the film.

== Plot ==
Radha Krishna, who runs a self-defense class for women, falls in love with a woman named Manasa (Kashmira Pardeshi). Meanwhile, his marriage gets fixed with her cousin Satya. Soon he comes up with a lie that he's gay to escape the situation. Soon after his marriage gets fixed to Satya's brother. What happens next forms the rest of the story.

== Cast ==
- Naga Shourya as Radha Krishna
- Kashmira Pardeshi as Manasa
- Yamini Bhaskar as Satya
- Shivaji Raja as Radha's father
- Ajay as Satya's brother
- Jaya Prakash Reddy as Satya's father
- Sudha as Satya's mother
- Priya as Radha's Mother
- Satyam Rajesh as an accident victim
- Gundu Sudarshan as priest Krishna

== Soundtrack ==
Music composed by Mahati Swara Sagar. Music released on Aditya Music Company.

All music is composed by Mahati Swara Sagar.

No.	Title	Singer(s)	Length
1.	"Egireney Manasu"	Mahathi Swara Sagar, Sameera Bharadwaj
2.	"Pichi Pichiga Nachaavuraa"	Lipsika
3.	"Ila Neetho"	Yazin Nizar, Ramya Behara
4.	"Dekhore Sodhara"	Anurag Kulkarni
5.	"Dhol Bhaje"	Yazin Nizar

== Reception ==
A critic from The Times of India wrote that "@Nartanasala isn't worth your time".
