= Chalo =

2018 Indian comedy drama film

- Theatrical release poster
- Directed by: Venky Kudumula
- Written by: Venky Kudumula
- Produced by: Usha Mulpuri
- Starring: Naga Shourya; Rashmika Mandanna
- Cinematography: Sai Sriram
- Edited by: Kotagiri Venkateswara Rao
- Music by: Mahati Swara Sagar
- Production company: Ira Creations
- Release date: 2 February 2018
- Running time: 140 min
- Country: India
- Language: Telugu
- Budget: ₹3 crore
- Box office: est. ₹24 crore

Chalo (transl. Let's go) is a 2018 Indian Telugu-language romantic action comedy film written and directed by Venky Kudumula in his directorial debut.

The film, produced by Usha Mulpuri under the Ira Creations banner, stars Naga Shaurya and Rashmika Mandanna (in her Telugu debut). Mahati Swara Sagar composed the soundtrack and background score for the film, while Sai Sriram handled the cinematography and Kotagiri Venkateswara Rao edited the film. The film was extensively shot in Hyderabad.

Released worldwide on 2 February 2018, the film became Naga Shaurya's highest-grossing film in India and overseas.

== Plot ==
The story starts with a man entering a jail cell. The inmate tells another inmate his history. He is the father of Hari, a young man who loves fights. When Hari was little and would cry, his father would let him beat someone, making him happy. As he became older, he often fought. The police warn Hari's father that if he fights with anyone, they will punish him. Fed up with his behavior, they decide to send Hari to Tiruppuram, a village on the border between Andhra Pradesh and Tamil Nadu, where there are daily fights between Telugu and Tamil people, upon the insistence of Hari's father's friend. They immediately send Hari there by lying to him that they received a transfer to Tiruppuram. Upon entering Tiruppuram, he is lured into the Tamil faction, escapes unscathed to the Telugu side, and befriends auto driver Bose, who explains the scenario in the village.

Hari's new college is governed by the authoritarian principal Paramatma, who shields the college from the village feud and discourages fights. After entering his college, where he is enrolled, he goes to the shed behind the college to participate in the fight between Telugu and Tamil people hosted by the canteen owner, where he accidentally helps the Tamil people win upon seeing Karthika, a Tamil girl, and is smitten with her. He later befriends Sathya, a Tamil student. Hari repeatedly tries to impress her, but she remains unimpressed. Finally, after he changes her mindset, she falls in love with him, but she needs the approval of her father Veeramuthu, the leader of the Tamil faction. A mix-up of names makes him seek the approval of Keshava, the leader of the Telugu faction and Veeramuthu's sworn nemesis. The village is governed by the zamindar, who acts as the negotiator between them. Hari accidentally helps Keshava humiliate Veeramuthu, earning the latter's ire.

Upon learning of Karthika's love with Hari, Veeramuthu fixes her marriage to Param, an NRI. To get into Veeramuthu's good books, Hari humiliates Keshava by making him set up posters of Hari and Karthika together. Later, Paramatma learns about the illegal fights taking place behind the college from Hari. Feeling betrayed, he attempts to resign, but the students, having been reformed, ask for forgiveness.

Hari's parents, having learnt of the situation from Param, arrive to help him. To learn about the feud's past, Hari, Sathya, and Paramatma kidnap all the elderly people from the village and learn that the village was once cohesive and the village heads, Veeramuthu Sr. and Rao Bahadur Keshava, were friends. In 1953, central government officials came to finalize the process of dividing Tiruppuram for the creation of Andhra Pradesh, but both village heads rejected it. While celebrating their victory at night, both Veeramuthu Sr. and Bahadur came out of their guest house injured, accusing each other of betrayal and provoking the villagers into fighting against each other. The border was created the next day after the agitated people from both sides signed the orders following their deaths.

On the night of Karthika's marriage, Hari learns that half of the assets of Veeramuthu Sr. and Bahadur were transferred to the zamindar, and he confronts him, where he learns that both Veeramuthu Sr. and Bahadur had an affair with Diana, a British woman, and that she died after being accidentally pushed by Bahadur. They stabbed each other in the scuffle. Diana's son, the zamindar, witnessed their deaths and withheld the truth for several years. Veeramuthu and Keshava, having been alerted, arrive there and learn the ugly truth about their fathers from Hari, who demands that they settle their feud and have Karthika marry him, threatening to expose their fathers' rivalry to the villagers. Constrained, they permanently settle the feud, becoming friends in the process, while Hari marries Karthika.

== Cast ==
- Naga Shourya as Hari
- Rashmika Mandanna as L. Karthika, Veeramuthu Jr's daughter
- Achyuth Kumar as Keshava, Rao Bahadur Keshava's son
- Mime Gopi as Veeramuthu, Karthika's father and Veeramuthu Sr.'s son
- Naresh as Hari's father
- Pragathi as Hari's mother
- Satya as Sathya, Tamil student in college
- Viva Harsha as Telugu student in college
- Sudharshan as Tamil Student in college
- Raghu Babu as Principal Paramathma
- Vennela Kishore as Revenge Param, Karthika's fiancée
- Praveen as Auto Driver Bose, Hari's friend
- Posani Krishna Murali as Hari and Karthika's lecturer
- Rajendran as Veeramuthu Sr.
- G. M. Kumar as the Zamindar, Diana's son
- Vasu Inturi as Nalla Seenu, College Canteen owner
- Sivannarayana Naripeddi as Mani, Hari father’s friend
- Swapnika as Raji, Karthika's friend
- Venugopal as Param's father

== Soundtrack ==
Chalo

Soundtrack album by Mahati Swara Sagar
- Released: 2 February 2018
- Recorded: 2017
- Genre: Soundtrack
- Length: 29:48
- Label: Aditya Music
- Producer: Mahati Swara Sagar

Mahati Swara Sagar chronology
Eedu Gold Ehe (2016)	Chalo (2018)	Nartanasala (2018)

Music composed by Mahati Swara Sagar. Music released on Aditya Music Company.

All music is composed by Mahati Swara Sagar.

No.	Title	Lyrics	Singer(s)	Length
1.	"Chal Godava"	Bhaskarabhatla Ravi Kumar	Yazin Nizar	3:33
2.	"Choosi Chudangane"	Bhaskarabhatla Ravi Kumar	Anurag Kulkarni, Saketh Komanduri, Aditya Iyengar, Dhanunjay, Saagar Mahati	5:29
3.	"Chepave Balamani"	Kasarla Shyam	Sweekar Agasthi	5:20
4.	"Drunk & Drive"	Kasarla Shyam	Rahul Sipligunj	4:53
5.	"Ammaye Chalo Antu"	Krishna Madineni	Yazin Nizar, Lipsika	3:59

== Reception ==
The Times of India rated the film three out of five stars and stated "Despite the story of Chalo being somewhat a cliché, director Venky somehow cleverly manages to turn the tropes into a fun and interesting ride." Srivathsan Nadadhur of The Hindu wrote:"Chalo is a good showreel for Naga Shaurya; it’s within the commercial domain and also one where we see his range as an actor." Hemanth Kumar of Firstpost gave the film a rating of 3/5 and opined that "Chalo turns the concept of cross-border enmity into a hilarious premise that’s full of surprises."

== Awards and nominations ==
Year	Award	Category	Recipient(s)	Result
2019	8th South Indian International Movie Awards	Best Debut Director (Telugu)	Venky Kudumula	Nominated
2019	8th South Indian International Movie Awards	Best Comedian (Telugu)	Satya	Won
2019	Radio City Cine Awards S2	Best Heroine	Rashmika Mandanna	Nominated
2019	Radio City Cine Awards S2	Best Comedian	Satya	Nominated
2019	Radio City Cine Awards S2	Best Debut	Rashmika Mandanna	Nominated
2019	Radio City Cine Awards S2	Family Entertainer of the Year	Chalo	Nominated
