= Vennela Kishore =

Indian film actor (born 1980)

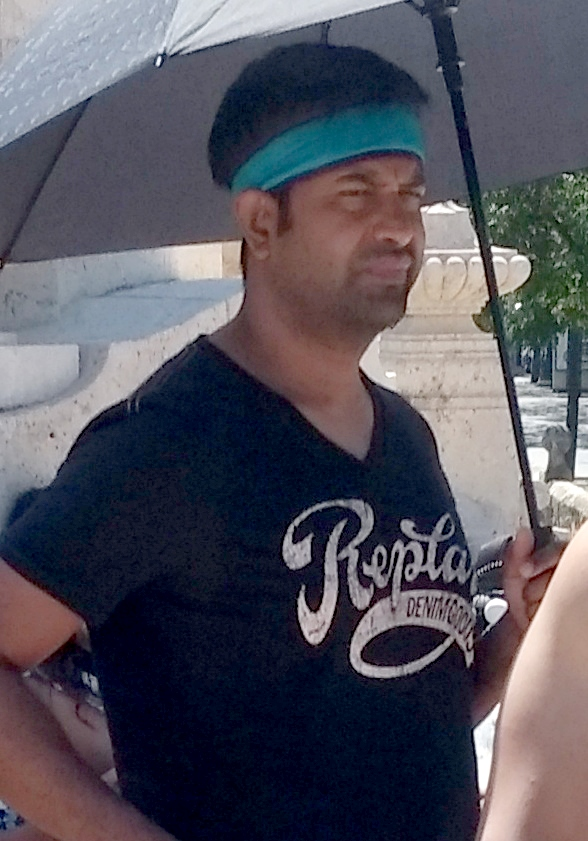
- Kishore at a shoot in València, 2016
- Born: Bokkala Kishore Kumar; 19 September 1980 (age 45); Kamareddy, Andhra Pradesh (now in Telangana), India
- Education: Ferris State University
- Occupations: Film actor; director; comedian
- Years active: 2005–present
- Works: Full list

Bokkala Kishore Kumar (born 19 September 1980), known professionally as Vennela Kishore, is an Indian actor and director who works in Telugu cinema. Known for his comedic roles, he earned the moniker "Vennela" after his first feature film Vennela (2005). He is a recipient of two Nandi Awards.

== Early life ==
Kishore was born and brought up in Kamareddy of present-day Telangana. He moved to Hyderabad for graduation and then emigrated to the US for higher studies. Kishore completed his master's degree in Ferris State University, Michigan and worked as a software engineer.

== Career ==
During his stay in the U.S., Kishore got an opportunity to work in Deva Katta's directorial Vennela (2005) which marked his entry into the film industry.

Kishore received appreciation for his role in the film DJ. His other performances include Bindaas, Pilla Zamindar, Daruvu, Sarkaru Vaari Paata, Badshah, Doosukeltha, Pandaga Chesko, Goodachari, S/O Satyamurthy, Srimanthudu, Bale Bale Magadivoy, Ekkadiki Pothavu Chinnavada, and Ami Thumi. He also directed two films (Vennela 1½, and Jaffa). After tasting failure with his directorial projects, he has returned to acting.

== Awards and nominations ==
List of awards and nominations
Year	Film	Award	Category	Result	Ref.
2010	Inkosaari	Nandi Awards of 2009	Best Male Comedian	Won	
2016	Bhale Bhale Magadivoy	Nandi Awards of 2015	Best Male Comedian	Won	
2016	Bhale Bhale Magadivoy	IIFA Utsavam	Best Comedian	Won	
2016	Bhale Bhale Magadivoy	5th South Indian International Movie Awards	Best Comedian – Telugu	Won	
2019	Chi La Sow	8th South Indian International Movie Awards	Best Comedian – Telugu	Nominated	
2019	—N/a	17th Santosham Film Awards	Santosham Allu Ramalingaiah Smarakam Award	Won	
2021	Meeku Maathrame Cheptha	9th South Indian International Movie Awards	Best Comedian – Telugu	Nominated	
2021	Bheeshma	10th South Indian International Movie Awards	Best Comedian – Telugu	Won	
2022	Rang De	10th South Indian International Movie Awards	Best Comedian – Telugu	Nominated	
2023	Sarkaru Vaari Paata	11th South Indian International Movie Awards	Best Comedian – Telugu	Nominated	
