= Pillaa Raa =

- cover of Pillaa Raa

Single by Anurag Kulkarni

from the album RX 100
- Language: Telugu
- English title: Come to me my dear girl!
- Released: 26 June 2018
- Studio: Moksha Studios; S&B Music Mill
- Genre: Romantic, Melody
- Length: 4:55
- Label: Mango Music
- Composer: Chaitan Bharadwaj
- Lyricist: Chaitanya Prasad
- Producer: Chaitan Bharadwaj

Music video
- "Pilla Raa" on YouTube

"Pillaa Raa" is an Indian Telugu language song composed by Chaitan Bharadwaj and sung by Anurag Kulkarni for the soundtrack of the 2018 romantic action-thriller film RX 100. The lyrics are penned by Chaitanya Prasad. The song's official lyrical version was released on 26 June 2018, while the full video song was released on 6 August 2018 under the music label Mango Music.

== Music video ==
The full video version of the song was officially released on 6 August 2018 on YouTube by Mango Music. The music video features Kartikeya Gummakonda and Payal Rajput acting for the single.

== Reception ==
The music video was popular because of its new-age music. The singer of the song, Anurag Kulkarni received huge recognition in Telugu music for his work for the song.

The film RX 100, gained popularity and recognition due to this song at the early stage of its release. After the release, the film went on to become superhit due to its versatile story-telling. Pillaa Raa became one of the most-played Telugu songs of the year.

== Records ==
The full video version of the song had around 250 million views (before it was removed) and the lyrical version of the song has around 20 million views on YouTube.

== Other versions ==
Mango Music also produced other versions of the song, such as the female version, Karaoke version and others.

== Awards and nominations ==
Year	Award(s)	Category	Recipient	Result
2018	Zee Cine Awards Telugu	Best Playback Singer - Male	Anurag Kulkarni	Won
2018	Zee Cine Awards Telugu	Best Music Director	Chaitan Bharadwaj	Nominated
2019	Radio City Cine Awards S2	Best Song	Pillaa Raa	Nominated
2019	8th South Indian International Movie Awards	SIIMA Award for Best Male Playback Singer (Telugu)	Anurag Kulkarni	Won
2019	8th South Indian International Movie Awards	SIIMA Award for Best Music Director (Telugu)	Chaitan Bharadwaj	Nominated
2019	17th Santosham Film Awards	Santosham Best Male Playback Singer	Anurag Kulkarni	Won
2019	66th Filmfare Awards South	Filmfare Award for Best Male Playback Singer – Telugu	Anurag Kulkarni	Nominated
2019	66th Filmfare Awards South	Filmfare Award for Best Lyricist – Telugu	Chaitanya Prasad	Nominated
