= 17th Santosham Film Awards =

2019 Tollywood award ceremony

- Awarded for: Excellence in cinematic and music achievements
- Presented on: 29 September 2019
- Date: 29 September 2019
- Site: Hyderabad, Telangana, India
- Hosted by: Udaya Bhanu; Sameer; Tejaswi Madivada; Tanish
- Produced by: Kondeti Suresh
- Organised by: Santosham Magazine

Highlights
- Lifetime achievement: Jamuna
- Most awards: Rangasthalam; RX 100

Television coverage
- Channel: 99TV; Zee Telugu; ZEE5
- Duration: 1 hour 57 minutes

The 17th Santosham Film Awards (Note: Also referred to in the news media as the "Santhosham South Indian Awards 2019") was an awards ceremony held at Hyderabad, India on 29 September 2019 recognized the best films and performances from the Tollywood films and music released in 2018, along with special honors for lifetime contributions and a few special awards. The awards are annually presented by Santosham magazine. It was live telecasted on 99TV network and was re-telecasted on Zee Telugu and Zee Cinemalu.

== Honorary Awards ==
- Santosham Lifetime Achievement Award – Jamuna
- Santosham Lifetime Achievement Award (Film Journalism) – Gudipoodi Srihari
- Santosham Allu Ramalingaiah Smarakam Award – Vennela Kishore
- Santosham Daggubati Ramanaidu Smarakam Award – Dil Raju
- Santosham Excellence Awards – Roja Ramani and Prabha

== Main awards ==
=== Film ===
Award Category	Recipient	Film
Best Actor	Kartikeya Gummakonda	RX 100
Best Director (Note: Sukumar couldn't attend the ceremony, so his wife, Tabhitha Bandreddy, received the award on his behalf.)	Sukumar	Rangasthalam
Best Supporting Actor	Rajendra Prasad	Mahanati
Best Comedian	Sunil	Aravinda Sametha Veera Raghava
Best Character Actor	Ramki	RX 100
Best Cinematographer	R. Rathnavelu	Rangasthalam
Best Debut Actor	Vishwak Sen	Ee Nagaraniki Emaindhi
Best Choreography	Prem Rakshith	Rangasthalam
Best Young Performers (Child Artiste)	Sai Tejaswini	Mahanati
Best Fight Master	Real Satish	RX 100

=== Music ===
Award Category	Recipient	Single/Album (film)
Best Music Director	S. Thaman	Aravinda Sametha Veera Raghava
Best Male Playback Singer	Anurag Kulkarni	"Pillaa Raa" from RX 100
Best Female Playback Singer	Ganta Venkata Lakshmi	"Jigelu Rani" from Rangasthalam

== Presenters ==
Category	Presenter(s)
Best Choreography Award	Rajendra Prasad
Best Cinematographer Award	Rajendra Prasad
Best Supporting Actor	Jamuna
Best Young Performers (Child Artiste)	Jamuna
Santosham Lifetime Achievement Award (Film Journalism)	Babu Mohan
Santosham Lifetime Achievement Award	Allu Aravind D. Suresh Babu
Santosham Allu Ramalingaiah Award	Allu Aravind
Santosham Daggubati Ramanaidu Smarakam Award	D. Suresh Babu
Best Director Award	Dil Raju
Best Comedian Award	Shriya Saran Ambika Krishna
Best Character Actor	Shriya Saran Ambika Krishna
Best Debut Actor	Shriya Saran
Best Actor Award	Jayam Ravi Shriya Saran
Santosham Sridevi Smarakam Award	Jayam Ravi Rajasekhar Jeevitha
Santosham Excellence Awards	D. Suresh Babu Allu Aravind
Best Music Director Award	Ganesh Venkatraman Rajasekhar Jeevitha
Best Male Playback Singer Award	S. Thaman
Best Female Playback Singer	S. Thaman

== Performers ==
- Avika Gor
- Sampoornesh Babu
- Deepthi Sunaina
- Nabha Natesh
- Singer Baby
- Natasha Doshi
- Tejaswi Madivada
- Raghuram, Sruthi & Gayathri
