= 90ML (2019 Telugu film) =

2019 Indian Telugu-language romantic comedy film

- Theatrical release poster
- Directed by: Sekhar Reddy Yerra
- Written by: Sekhar Reddy Yerra
- Produced by: Ashok Reddy Gummakonda
- Starring: Kartikeya; Neha Solanki; Ravi Kishan
- Cinematography: J. Yuvaraj
- Edited by: M. S. Rajashekhara Reddy (S. R. Shekhar)
- Music by: Anup Rubens
- Production company: Kartikeya Creative Works
- Release date: 6 December 2019
- Running time: 159 minutes
- Country: India
- Language: Telugu

90ML is a 2019 Indian Telugu-language romantic comedy action film directed by Sekhar Reddy Yerra and starring Kartikeya and newcomer Neha Solanki in the lead roles. The film is produced by Ashok Reddy Gummakonda, who previously produced RX 100 (2018).

== Plot ==
Devadas (Kartikeya) is born with a fetal alcoholic syndrome and needs to drink 90 mL liquor three times a day to survive. He falls in love with Suvasana (Neha Solanki), who hates alcohol. The twist in the tale arises when Jon Wick (Ravi Kishan) enters the love story and creates a chaos. What will Devadas do now? How will he manage his drinking problem, his lady love, and the villain at the same time forms the rest of the story.

== Cast ==
- Kartikeya as Devadas
- Neha Solanki as Suvasana
- Ravi Kishan as Jayram (John Wick)
- Ajay as Seshu
- Rao Ramesh as Kshunaakar Rao, Suvasana's father
- Pragathi as Devadas's mother
- Satya Prakash as Ramdas, Devadas's father
- Roll Rida as Kishore
- Raghu Karumanchi as John Wick's henchman
- Prabhakar as Raja
- Posani Krishna Murali as Murali
- Ali as Dr. Nadiridinna, Rehabilitation Center
- Gundu Sudarshan as Doctor
- Praveen as Vignesh
- Thagubothu Ramesh as Ramesh
- Duvvasi Mohan
- C. V. L. Narasimha Rao as Doctor
- Kalyani
- Baby Nidhi Reddy
- Sattanna as Pelli Pedha

== Production ==
Director Ajay of RX 100 helped Sekhar Reddy meet Kartikeya. Television actress Neha Solanki was signed as the lead actress with Ravi Kishan, Satya Prakash, and rapper Roll Rida playing supporting roles. Three songs were shot in Azerbaijan. The first look poster was revealed in September 2019. The film gained media coverage due to its title and first look poster. The songs composed by Anup Rubens were well received by audience. Kartikeya plays a drunkard in the film who has a disease that requires him to drink daily. The teaser released on 21 September. The trailer released on 20 September. The film was originally scheduled to release on 5 December, but was postponed to 6 December after the film ran into issues when the Central Board of Film Certification asked the makers of the film to remove some scenes.

== Soundtrack ==
The music was composed by Anup Rubens and the lyrics were written by Chandrabose.

90 ML

Soundtrack album by Anup Rubens
- Released: 22 April 2019
- Recorded: 2019
- Genre: Feature Film Soundtrack
- Label: Mango Music
- Producer: Ashok Reddy Gummakonda

No.	Title	Singer(s)	Length
1.	"Singilu Singilu"	Rahul Sipligunj, M. M. Manasi
2.	"Yinipinchukoru"	Rahul Sipligunj
3.	"Natho Nuvvunte Chalu"	Adnan Sami
4.	"Vellipothunde"	Anup Rubens
5.	"90ML Title song"	Anurag Kulkarni
6.	"Anukoledhe Anukoledhe"	Ramya Behara
7.	"Vendella Life lona"	Saisharan, Sahithi

== Reception ==
The Deccan Chronicle gave the film one-and-a-half out of five stars and wrote that "At the end of it all, 90ML is like a bad drink". The Times of India gave the film two out of five stars and stated that "None of the scenes blend into each other. and the film just ends up seeming like a mishmash of random scenes that lead to a forced yet predictable ending". Telangana Today wrote that "While performance of Karthikeya in the lead role is somewhat laudable, the film as a whole is not more than a one-time watch".
