= Hippi (film) =

- Theatrical release poster
- Directed by: Krishna
- Written by: T. N. Krishna
- Starring: Kartikeya; Digangana Suryavanshi; J. D. Chakravarthy
- Cinematography: R. D. Rajasekhar
- Edited by: Praveen K. L.
- Music by: Nivas K. Prasanna
- Production companies: V Creations; Asian Cinemas
- Release date: 6 June 2019
- Running time: 143 minutes
- Country: India
- Language: Telugu

Hippi is a 2019 Indian Telugu-language romantic action comedy film written and directed by T. N. Krishna and produced by V Creations and Asian Cinemas. The film stars Kartikeya, Digangana Suryavanshi, and J. D. Chakravarthy. The principal photography commenced in November 2018 and the film was released on 6 June 2019.

== Plot ==
The plot revolves around two people who fall in love and lust but are overpowered by their egos, one thing leads to another and to prove his manliness the guy forces himself on the girl, which ends up consensual. The film ends with the couple having sex for the rest of the time.

== Cast ==
- Karthikeya as Devdas Nadimpalli aka Hippi
- Digangana Suryavanshi as Aamukthamaalyadha
- J. D. Chakravarthy as Hippi's boss and mentor
- Brahmaji as Hippi's brother-in-law
- Md Asif as MMA coach as a guest appearance
- Jazba Singh as Sneha, Hippi's first girlfriend
- Vennela Kishore as Harley Davidson aka HD
- Hari Teja as a maid
- Fish Venkat as a drunkard
- Shraddha Das in a cameo appearance

== Production ==
Following the box office success of the RX 100 which was released in May 2018, the lead actor received many call sheets from new directors as the actor revealed that he was confused about choosing the correct scripts to pursue his acting career. Krishna who is known for his works in Tamil cinema decided to cast Kartikeya in the lead role in order to make a Telugu film.

The shooting of the film commenced on 9 November 2018, soon after the launching ceremony of the film in Hyderabad. The few portions of the film were shot in Hyderabad before the filmmakers paving the way to shoot most of the portions of the film in Chennai. The remaining portions of the film are being shot in Sri Lanka.

== Soundtrack ==
The soundtrack was composed by Nivas K. Prasanna in his Telugu debut.

Hippi

Soundtrack album by Nivas K. Prasanna
- Released: 2019
- Genre: Feature film soundtrack
- Length: 27:12
- Language: Telugu
- Label: Mango Music
- Producer: Nivas K. Prasanna

Nivas K. Prasanna chronology
Devarattam (2019)	Hippi (2019)	Kodiyil Oruvan (2021)

No.	Title	Singer(s)	Length
1.	"Yevathive"	Karthik	4:24
2.	"Hey Yela"	Sathya Prakash	3:20
3.	"Viral"	Raghu Dixit, Vishnupriya Ravi, Christopher Stanley, MC Vickey	3:54
4.	"Hey Yela (Sad Version)"	Chinmayi	3:26
5.	"Maar Maar"	Ranjith	4:38
6.	"Padipoyanetho"	Haricharan	3:52
7.	"Nee Naa"	Nivas K Prasanna, Sanjana Kalmanje	3:38
Total length:			27:12
