= Mangalavaaram =

2023 film by Ajay Bhupathi

- Theatrical release poster
- Directed by: Ajay Bhupathi
- Written by: Ajay Bhupathi
- Story by: Ajay Bhupathi
- Produced by: Swathi Reddy Gunupati; Suresh Varma M. Ajay Bhupathi
- Starring: Payal Rajput; Nandita Swetha; Priyadarshi Pulikonda; Divya Pillai; Ajmal Ameer; Chaitanya Krishna; Ravindra Vijay
- Cinematography: Dasaradhi Sivendra
- Edited by: Madhav Kumar Gullapalli
- Music by: B. Ajaneesh Loknath
- Production companies: Mudhra Media Works; A Creative Works
- Release date: 17 November 2023
- Running time: 143 minutes
- Country: India
- Language: Telugu

Mangalavaaram (transl. Tuesday) is a 2023 Indian Telugu-language psychological mystery thriller film written and directed by Ajay Bhupathi. It is produced by Swathi Reddy Gunupati, Suresh Varma M., and Ajay Bhupathi, under Mudhra Media Works and A Creative Works. The film features an ensemble cast including Payal Rajput, Nandita Swetha, Priyadarshi Pulikonda, Divya Pillai, Ajmal Ameer, Chaitanya Krishna, and Ravindra Vijay.

The music was composed by B. Ajaneesh Loknath with cinematography by Dasaradhi Sivendra and editing by Madhav Kumar Gullapalli. The film released on 17 November 2023.

== Plot ==
In 1996, life in a village appears peaceful. A mysterious series of murders then occurs twice: before each killing, someone writes on the wall of a house, accusing a married woman and a married man of having an illicit affair. Soon after, the accused individuals are found dead. The villagers initially believe the victims committed suicide out of shame, until police inspector Maya notices suspicious clues at the crime scenes, suggesting that both cases were murders. One week later, villagers apprehend a young man named Nani while he is attempting to write on a wall and hand him over to the police. However, Maya soon releases him after reviewing the postmortem reports of the previous victims, concluding that he cannot be the killer. Around the same time, the village doctor, Viswanatham, claims to have seen the ghost of a villager named Sailaja, sparking a terrifying rumor that Sailaja's vengeful spirit is committing the murders.

One year ago, Sailaja, who was mentally disturbed and suffered from nymphomania, had some casual sex with some men in the village. She was harshly judged, and many men began to harass and exploit her. When the village headman Prakasam learned of this, he ordered Sailaja to be expelled from the village. Shortly afterward, Sailaja was found dead after falling into a well.

One week later, Maya catches the real killer—Viswanatham—while he is once again attempting to write names on a wall. Maya had deduced his involvement from the postmortem reports, which revealed that anesthesia had been used to sedate the victims before their deaths, making Viswanatham the prime suspect. Viswanatham resists arrest and attacks Maya, knocking her unconscious. She later wakes up tied inside Viswanatham's house, where they confront each other, and Viswanatham reveals the truth.

When Sailaja was alive, Viswanatham showed empathy and tried to help her, medically and emotionally. He tried to treat her and brought back Ravi - Sailaja's childhood love interest, who was deemed dead 10 years ago - to her. Ravi and Sailaja planned to marry and leave the village together, but before they could do so, Prakasam ordered Sailaja to be expelled. Sailaja did not commit suicide after being driven out; she was murdered. Earlier, she had accidentally witnessed Prakasam's wife, Rajeswari Devi, having an affair with photographer Vasu. To protect her reputation, Rajeswari manipulated Prakasam into expelling Sailaja and later arranged her murder with the help of several villagers. Viswanatham and Ravi decided to avenge Sailaja's death. Together, they killed four people involved in the crime, writing their names on the walls before each murder. As Viswanatham narrates this to Maya, Ravi kills Vasu, leaving Rajeswari as the last person responsible for Sailaja's death.

Prakasam, who has returned to the village to investigate the ongoing murders, overhears the confrontation between Viswanatham and Maya. After returning home, he kills Rajeswari by burning her alive. He later tells the villagers that Rajeswari sacrificed herself to Mahalaximi to end the cycle of deaths and save the village.

At the end, Maya allows Viswanatham to go free, choosing neither to arrest him nor to reveal the truth to the village.

== Cast ==
- Nandita Swetha as SI Maaya
- Priyadarshi Pulikonda as Ravi
- Payal Rajput as Sailaja "Sailu"
  - Shaurya as Young Sailu
- Chaitanya Krishna as Zamindar Prakasam Babu
- Ravindra Vijay as RMP Viswanatham
- Divya Pillai as Rajeswari Devi, Prakasam Babu's wife
- Ajmal Ameer as Madan, Sailaja's Professor
- Aayushi Patel as Professor Madan's wife
- Ajay Ghosh as Kaasi Raju
- Shravan Reddy as Vasu, the photographer and Rajeswari's lover
- Lakshman Meesala as Puli 'Guddodu', Kaasi Raju's assistant
- Rahul Varma as Nani
- Srilekha Rajendran as Sooramma, Sailu's grandmother
- Ananth Prabu as Sailaja's father
- Sritej as Guraja
- Thanmai Bolt as Nagamani
- Tharun Bhascker in a special appearance in the song "Appadappada Thaandra"

== Production ==
=== Development ===
Principal filming started on 9 December 2022, and the shoot was wrapped up on 13 June 2023.

Payal Rajput played the principal lead in the film, marking her second collaboration with Ajay Bhupathi after RX 100.

== Music ==
Mangalavaaram

Soundtrack album by B. Ajaneesh Loknath
- Released: 15 December 2023
- Genre: Feature film soundtrack
- Length: 16:00
- Language: Telugu
- Label: Saregama

B. Ajaneesh Loknath chronology
Hostel Hudugaru Bekagiddare (2023)	Mangalavaaram (2023)	Kaiva (2023)
External audio
- Mangalavaaram – Full Album on YouTube

B. Ajaneesh Loknath composed both the music and background score for the film. The first single, Ganagana Mogalira, was released on 16 August 2023, followed by the second single, Emayyindho Emito, on 7 October. The third single, Appadappada Thaandra, featuring Tharun Bhascker in a cameo appearance, was released on 3 November, and was featured during the end credits of the film.

Track listing
No.	Title	Lyrics	Singer(s)	Length
1.	"Ganagana Mogalira"	Bhaskarabhatla	V. M. Mahalingam	3:54
2.	"Emayyindho Emito"	Chaitanya Prasad	Harshika Devanath	3:51
3.	"Appadappada Thaandra"	Ganesh A	Rahul Sipligunj	4:31
4.	"O Praanama"	Sira Sri	Chinmayi Sripaada	3:44
Total length:				16:00

=== Background score ===
The background score was released on 4 January 2024.

No.	Title	Length
1.	"Truth On The Wall"	1:58
2.	"The Village"	0:39
3.	"The Shock"	0:44
4.	"First Death"	0:26
5.	"Reveal"	1:06
6.	"Jamindar"	1:05
7.	"The Intro"	0:50
8.	"The Long First Love"	2:32
9.	"The Blind"	0:43
Total length:		10:06

== Reception ==
Raghu Bandi of The Indian Express gave 2.5/5 stars and wrote, "Mangalavaaram is an ambitious film that gets lost in the jungle it creates. This is definitely an adult film that is not recommended for children or home viewing. The sexual identity of men and women in society is an important discussion raised in this film. Ajay Bhupathi merits appreciation for choosing such a bold topic." Telangana Today wrote, "Mangalavaaram is a technically superior film with strong performances. While a stronger flashback could enhance its impact, the film remains an impressive outing." Sangeetha Devi Dundoo of The Hindu wrote, "Mangalavaaram delivers a few momentary thrills and guarantees a theatrical experience with its production design, cinematography and sound design. But beyond that, the film does not become an absorbing saga of a troubled character, which it sets out to be."

== Release ==
=== Theatrical ===
It was released on 17 November 2023, with dubbed versions in four Indian languages: Mangalavaara in Kannada, Mangalavaar in Hindi, Chevvaikizhamai in Tamil and Chovvazhcha in Malayalam.

=== Home media ===
The film was premiered digitally on Disney Plus Hotstar on 26 December 2023 in Telugu, Tamil, Kannada & Malayalam languages. The film's Hindi dubbed version premiered on Zee Cinema on 9 August 2024 at 8:00 pm.
