= 8th South Indian International Movie Awards =

Indian annual film awards event

- Awarded for: Excellence in South Indian cinema and Music
- Date: 15–16 August 2019
- Site: Lusail Sports Arena, Doha, Qatar
- Hosted by: Rahul Ramakrishna, Suma Kanakala, Priyadarshi Pulikonda, Mirchi Shiva, Anupama Gowda, Pearle Maaney
- Produced by: Vibri Media Group
- Organized by: Vibri Media Group

Highlights
- Most awards: Rangasthalam , K.G.F: Chapter 1 (8)

Television coverage
- Channel: Gemini TV (Telugu); Sun TV (Tamil); Surya TV (Malayalam); Udaya TV (Kannada)
- Network: Sun TV Network

The 8th South Indian International Movie Awards is an awards event held at Qatar on 15–16 August 2019. SIIMA 2019 recognized the best films and performances from the Telugu, Tamil, Malayalam and Kannada films and music released in 2018, along with special honors for lifetime contributions and a few special awards. The nomination list for the main awards was announced in July 2019.

== Honorary awards ==
- Suresh Kumar & Menaka Sureshkumar (Lifetime Achievement Award)

== Main awards ==
=== Film ===
Best Film
Telugu	Tamil
Mahanati – Vyjayanthi Movies; Aravinda Sametha Veera Raghava – Haarika & Hasinee Creations; Bharat Ane Nenu – DVV Entertainments; Geetha Govindam – GA2 Pictures; Rangasthalam – Mythri Movie Makers	Pariyerum Perumal – Neelam Productions; 96 – Madras Enterprises; Kadaikutty Singam – 2D Entertainment; Sarkar – Sun Pictures; Vada Chennai – Wunderbar Films
Kannada	Malayalam
K.G.F: Chapter 1 – Hombale Films; Ayogya – Crystal Park Cinemas; Raambo 2 – Ladoo Cinema House & De Arte Studios; Sarkari Hi. Pra. Shaale, Kasaragodu, Koduge: Ramanna Rai – Rishab Shetty Films; Tagaru – Venus Entertainers	Sudani from Nigeria – Happy Hours Entertainments; Aravindante Athidhikal – Pathiyara Entertainments & Big Bang Entertainments; Ee.Ma.Yau – OPM Cinemas & RGK Cinemas; Kayamkulam Kochunni – Sree Gokulam Movies; Varathan – Fahadh Faasil & Friends & Amal Neerad Productions
SIIMA Award for Best Director
Telugu	Tamil
Sukumar – Rangasthalam; Indraganti Mohan Krishna – Sammohanam; Nag Ashwin – Mahanati; Parasuram – Geetha Govindam; Trivikram Srinivas – Aravinda Sametha Veera Raghava	Pandiraj – Kadaikutty Singam; Ajay Gnanamuthu – Imaikka Nodigal; A. R. Murugadoss – Sarkar; Shankar – 2.0; Vetrimaaran – Vada Chennai
Kannada	Malayalam
Prashanth Neel – K.G.F: Chapter 1; Anil Kumar – Raambo 2; Dayal Padmanabhan– Aa Karaala Ratri; Duniya Soori – Tagaru; Rishab Shetty – Sarkari Hi. Pra. Shaale, Kasaragodu, Koduge: Ramanna Rai	Sathyan Anthikkad- Njan Prakashan; Amal Neerad – Varathan; Lijo Jose Pellissery – Ee.Ma.Yau; Rosshan Andrews – Kayamkulam Kochunni; Zakariya- Sudani from Nigeria
Best Cinematographer
Telugu	Tamil
R Rathnavelu – Rangasthalam; Dani Sanchez-Lopez – Mahanati; George C Williams – Tholi Prema; Jay Kay – Padi Padi Leche Manasu; Shaneil Deo – Goodachari	R. D. Rajasekhar – Imaikkaa Nodigal; Nirav Shah – 2.0; Sivakumar Vijayan – Kolamavu Kokila; Velraj – Vada Chennai; S. Venkatesh – Tik Tik Tik
Kannada	Malayalam
Bhuvan Gowda – K.G.F: Chapter 1; Mahendra Simmha – Tagaru; PKH Das – Aa Karaala Ratri; Sudhakar Raj – Raambo 2; Venkatesh Anguraj – Sarkari Hi. Pra. Shaale, Kasaragodu, Koduge: Ramanna Rai	Gireesh Gangadharan –Swathanthryam Ardharathriyil; Binod Pradhan – Kayamkulam Kochunni; Littil Swayamp – Varathan; Nikhil S Praveen – Bhayanakam; Shyju Khalid – Sudani From Nigeria,Ee.Ma.Yau

=== Acting ===
Best Actor
Telugu	Tamil
Ram Charan Teja – Rangasthalam; Mahesh Babu – Bharat Ane Nenu; NTR Jr. – Aravinda Sametha Veera Raghava; Dulquer Salmaan – Mahanati; Vijay Devarakonda – Geetha Govindam	Dhanush – Vada Chennai; Vijay – Sarkar; Karthi – Kadaikutty Singam; Jayam Ravi – Adanga Maru; Vijay Sethupathi – 96
Kannada	Malayalam
Yash – K.G.F: Chapter 1; Ananth Nag – Sarkari Hi. Pra. Shaale, Kasaragodu, Koduge: Ramanna Rai; Sathish Ninasam – Ayogya; Sharan – Raambo 2; Shiva Rajkumar – Tagaru	Tovino Thomas – Various films; Jayasurya – Captain; Joju George – Joseph; Mohanlal – Odiyan; Nivin Pauly – Kayamkulam Kochunni
Best Actress
Telugu	Tamil
Keerthy Suresh – Mahanati; Aditi Rao Hydari – Sammohanam; Anushka Shetty – Bhaagamathie; Rashmika Mandanna – Geetha Govindam; Samantha Akkineni – Rangasthalam	Trisha Krishnan – 96; Aishwarya Rajesh – Kanaa; Jyothika – Kaatrin Mozhi; Nayanthara – Kolamavu Kokila; Samantha Akkineni – Irumbu Thirai
Kannada	Malayalam
Rachita Ram – Ayogya; Ashika Ranganath – Raambo 2; Manvitha Harish – Tagaru; Shruti Hariharan – Nathicharami; Sonu Gowda – Gultoo	Aishwarya Lekshmi – Varathan; Anu Sithara – Captain; Nikhila Vimal – Aravindante Athidhikal; Nimisha Sajayan – Eeda; Trisha Krishnan – Hey Jude
SIIMA Award for Best Actor in a Supporting Role
Telugu	Tamil
Rajendra Prasad – Mahanati; Aadhi Pinisetty – Rangasthalam; Murali Sharma – Vijetha; Naresh – Sammohanam; Ramki – RX 100	Prakash Raj – 60 Vayadu Maaniram; Ameer – Vada Chennai; Samuthirakani – Kaala; Sathyaraj – Kanaa; Silambarasan – Chekka Chivantha Vaanam
Kannada	Malayalam
Achyuth Kumar – K.G.F: Chapter 1; Karthik Jayaram – Aa Karaala Ratri; Radhakrishna Urala – Ammachi Yemba Nenapu; Roger Narayan – Humble Politician Nograj; Vasishta N. Simha – Tagaru	Roshan Mathew – Koode; Arjun Ashokan – B.Tech; Dileesh Pothan – Joseph/Ee.Ma.Yau; K. T. C. Abdullah – Sudani from Nigeria; Siddharth – Kammara Sambhavam
SIIMA Award for Best Actress in a Supporting Role
Telugu	Tamil
Anasuya Bharadwaj – Rangasthalam; Asha Sarath – Bhaagamathie; Jayasudha – Srinivasa Kalyanam; Ramya Krishnan – Sailaja Reddy Alludu; Supriya – Goodachari	Easwari Rao – Kaala; Andrea Jeremiah – Vada Chennai; Ramya Krishnan – Thaanaa Serndha Koottam; Saranya Ponvannan – Kolamavu Kokila; Poorna – Savarakathi
Kannada	Malayalam
Archana Jois – K.G.F: Chapter 1; Ashvithi Shetty – Ananthu Vs Nusrath; Bhavana Menon – Tagaru; Kavya Sha – Loud Speaker; Shreya Anchan – Katheyondu Shuruvagide	Lena – Aadhi; Muthumani – Uncle; Mala Parvathy – Koode; Savithri Sreedharan – Sudani from Nigeria; Urvashi – Aravindante Athidhikal
SIIMA Award for Best Actor in a Negative Role
Telugu	Tamil
Sarathkumar – Naa Peru Surya; Jagapati Babu – Rangasthalam; Jayaram – Bhaagamathie; Kunal Kapoor – Devadas; R. Madhavan – Savyasachi	Varalaxmi Sarathkumar – Sarkar; Akshay Kumar – 2.0; Anurag Kashyap – Imaikka Nodigal; Arjun – Irumbu Thirai; Simran – Seema Raja
Kannada	Malayalam
Dhananjay – Tagaru; Balakrishna. P – Sarkari Hi. Pra. Shaale, Kasaragodu, Koduge: Ramanna Rai; Danny Sapani – Tharakasura; Ramachandra Raju – K.G.F: Chapter 1; P. Ravishankar – Ayogya	Sharafudheen – Varathan; Ganesh Venkatraman – My Story; Jagapathi Babu – Aadhi; Joju George – Njan Marykutty; Prakash Raj – Odiyan
SIIMA Award for Best Comedian
Telugu	Tamil
Sathya – Chalo; Prudhvi Raj – Sailaja Reddy Alludu; Sunil – Amar Akbar Anthony; Vennela Kishore – Chi La Sow; Vishnu – Taxiwala	Yogi Babu – Kolamavu Kokila; Revathi – Gulaebaghavali; Sathish – Tamizh Padam 2; Shiva – Kalakalappu 2; Soori – Kadaikutty Singam
Kannada	Malayalam
Prakash Thuminad – Sarkari Hi. Pra. Shaale, Kasaragodu, Koduge: Ramanna Rai; Chikkanna – Raambo 2; Kuri Prathap – Ayogya; Sadhu Kokila – Victory 2; Vijay Chendoor – Humble Politician Nograj	Aju Varghese – Aravindante Athidhikal; Dharmajan – Kuttanadan Marpappa; Hareesh Perumanna – Ente Ummante Peru; Navas Vallikkunnu – Sudani from Nigeria; Sharafudheen– Johny Johny Yes Papa

=== Debut awards ===
SIIMA Award for Best Debut Actor
Telugu	Tamil
Kalyaan Dhev – Vijetha; Aashish Gandhi – Natakam; Rahul Vijay – Ee Maaya Peremito; Srinivasa Sayee – Subhalekha + Lu; Sumanth Sailendra – Brand Babu	Dinesh – Oru Kuppa Kathai; Adhithya Bhaskar – 96; Anthony – Merku Thodarchi Malai; Darshan – Kanaa; Saravanan – Raatchasan
Kannada	Malayalam
Danish Sait – Humble Politician Nograj; Naveen Shankar – Gultoo; Niranjan Sudhindra – Second Half; Prakyath Paramesh – Naduve Antharavirali; Vaibhav – Tharakasura	Pranav Mohanlal – Aadhi; Bibin George – Oru Pazhaya Bomb Kadha; Druvan Druv – Queen; Kalidas Jayaram – Poomaram; Senthil Krishna – Chalakkudykkaran Changathy
SIIMA Award for Best Debut Actress
Telugu	Tamil
Payal Rajput – RX 100; Ashima Narwal – Natakam; Kiara Advani – Bharat Ane Nenu; Nabha Natesh – Nannu Dochukunduvate; Nidhi Agerwal – Savyasachi; Ruhani Sharma – Chi La Sow	Raiza Wilson – Pyaar Prema Kaadhal; Amritha Aiyer – Padaiveeran; Ditya – Lakshmi; Gouri G. Kishan – 96; Ivana – Naachiyaar
Kannada	Malayalam
Anupama Gowda – Aa Karaala Ratri; Aishwarya Arjun – Prema Baraha; Nishvika Naidu – Amma I Love You; Sonal Monteiro – Abhisaarike; Sonika Gowda – Shathaya Gathaya; Srinidhi Shetty – K.G.F: Chapter 1	Saniya Iyappan – Queen; Devika Sanjay – Njan Prakashan; Neeta Pillai – Poomaram; Saranya R. Nair – Maradona; Surabhi Santhosh – Kuttanadan Marpappa
SIIMA Award for Best Debut Director
Telugu	Tamil
Ajay Bhupathi – RX 100; Rahul Ravindran – Chi La Sow; Venky Atluri – Tholi Prema; Venky Kudumula – Chalo; Venu Udugula – Needi Naadi Oke Katha	Nelson – Kolamavu Kokila; Arunraja Kamaraj – Kanaa; C. Premkumar – 96; Lenin Bharathi – Merku Thodarchi Malai; Mari Selvaraj – Pariyerum Perumal
Kannada	Malayalam
S. Mahesh Kumar – Ayogya; Janardhan Chikkanna – Gultoo; Raveen Kumara – Naduve Antaravirali; Saad Khan – Humble Politician Nograj; Senna Hegde – Katheyondu Shuruvagide	Zakariya – Sudani from Nigeria; Dijo Jose Anthony – Queen; Prajesh Sen – Captain; Rathish Ambat – Kammara Sambhavam; Va Shrikumar Menon – Odiyan

=== Music ===
SIIMA Award for Best Music Director
Telugu	Tamil
Devi Sri Prasad – Rangasthalam; Chaitan Bharadwaj – RX 100; Gopi Sundar – Geetha Govindam; Mickey J Meyer – Mahanati; S. Thaman – Aravinda Sametha Veera Raghava	Anirudh Ravichander – Kolamavu Kokila; A. R. Rahman – Chekka Chivantha Vaanam; Govind Vasantha – 96; Santhosh Narayanan – Pariyerum Perumal; Yuvan Shankar Raja – Pyaar Prema Kaadhal
Kannada	Malayalam
Ravi Basrur – K.G.F: Chapter 1; Arjun Janya – Ayogya; Charan Raj – Tagaru; Judah Sandhy – Thayige Thakka Maga; Vasuki Vaibhav – Sarkari Hi. Pra. Shaale, Kasaragodu, Koduge: Ramanna Rai	Sushin Shyam – Varathan, Maradona; Kailas Menon – Theevandi; Ranjan Raj – Joseph; Rex Vijayan – Sudani from Nigeria; Shaan Rahman – Aravindante Athidhikal
SIIMA Award for Best Lyricist
Telugu	Tamil
Chandrabose – "Yentha Sakkagunnave" from Rangasthalam; Anantha Sriram – "Inkem Inkem" from Geetha Govindam; Krishnakanth – "Maate Vinadugaa" from Taxiwaala; Ramajogayya Sastry – "Peniviti" from Aravinda Sametha Veera Raghava; Sirivennela Seetharama Sastry – "Mooga Manasulu" from Mahanati	Vignesh Shivan – "Naana Thaana" from Thaanaa Serndha Koottam; Karthik Netha – "Kadhale Kadhale" from 96; Madhan Karky – "Kurumba" from Tik Tik Tik; Na. Muthukumar – "Pulinangal" from 2.0; Viveka – "Pottakattil Poovasam" from Pariyerum Perumal
Kannada	Malayalam
Chethan Kumar – "Yenammi Yenammi" from Ayogya; K. Kalyan – "Hey Sharadhe" from Sarkari Hi. Pra. Shaale, Kasaragodu, Koduge: Ramanna Rai; Prem – "Hey Jaleela" from Ambi Ning Vayassaytho; Siddhu Kodipura – "Eega Thaane Jaariyagide" from Ananthu Vs Nusrath; V. Nagendra Prasad – "Salaam Rocky Bhai" from K.G.F: Chapter 1	Vinayak Sasikumar – "Nilapakshikal" from Maradona; Ajesh Dasan – "Neramayi" from Poomaram; Anwar Ali – "Mizhi Niranju" from Eeda; B. K. Harinarayanan – "Jeevamshamayi" from Theevandi; Rafeeq Ahamed – "Kondoram" from Odiyan
SIIMA Award for Best Male Playback Singer
Telugu	Tamil
Anurag Kulkarni – "Pillaa Raa" from RX 100; Kaala Bhairava – "Peniviti" from Aravinda Sametha Veera Raghava; Kailash Kher – "Vochadayyo Saami" from Bharat Ane Nenu; Rahul Sipligunj – "Ranga Ranga" from Rangasthalam; Sid Sriram – "Inkem Inkem" from Geetha Govindam	Anthony Daasan – "Sodukku Mela" from Thaanaa Serndha Koottam; Anirudh Ravichander – "Kalyana Vayasu" from Kolamavu Kokila; A. R. Rahman – "Mazhai Kuruvi" from Chekka Chivantha Vaanam; Pradeep Kumar – "The Life of Ram" from 96; Sid Sriram – "High on Love" from Pyaar Prema Kaadhal
Kannada	Malayalam
H.S Srinivasa Murthy, Mohan, Puneeth Rudranag, Sachin Basrur, Santhosh Venky, Vijay Prakash, Vijay Urs – "Salaam Rocky Bhai" from K.G.F: Chapter 1; Anthony Daasan – "Tagaru Tagaru" from Tagaru; Naveen Sajju – "Yenne Namdu" from Kanaka; Sanjith Hegde – "Shakunthale Sikkalu" from Naduve Antaravirali; Vasuki Vaibhav – "Dadda Song" from Sarkari Hi. Pra. Shaale, Kasaragodu, Koduge: Ramanna Rai	Vijay Yesudas – "Poomuthole" from Joseph; Biju Narayanan – "Doore" from Njan Marykutty; K. S. Harisankar – "Jeevamshamayi" from Theevandi; Karthik – "Vaanaville" from Koode / "Neramayi" from Poomaram; Shahabaz Aman – "Kurrah" from Sudani from Nigeria
SIIMA Award for Best Female Playback Singer
Telugu	Tamil
M. M. Manasi – "Rangamma Mangamma" from Rangasthalam; Chinmayi – "Yenti Yenti" from Geetha Govindam; Shreya Ghoshal – "Allasani Vari" from Tholi Prema; Shreya Gopuraju – "Tik Tik Tik" from Savyasachi; Sunitha Upadrashta – "Chivaraku Migiledi" from Mahanati	Dhee – "Rowdy Baby" from Maari 2; Andrea Jeremiah – "Saadhi Madham" from Vishwaroopam 2; Chinmayi – "Kadhale Kadhale" from 96; Shakthisree Gopalan – "Bhoomi Bhoomi" from Chekka Chivantha Vaanam; Shweta Mohan – "Poovukku" from Nimir
Kannada	Malayalam
Ananya Bhat – "Hold On" from Tagaru; Asha – "Hey Sharadhe" from Sarkari Hi. Pra. Shaale, Kasaragodu, Koduge: Ramanna Rai; Airaa Acharya – "Jokae Naanu" from K.G.F: Chapter 1; Palak Muchhal – "Yenammi Yenammi" from Ayogya; Shamita Malnad – "Chuttu Chuttu" from Raambo 2	Sithara Krishnakumar – "Maarivil" from Eeda; Anne Amie – "Aaraaro" from Koode; K. S. Chithra – "Mrudumandahaasam" from Poomaram; Prarthana Indrajith – "Laletta" from Mohanlal; Shreya Ghoshal – "Neermathalam" from Aami

== Technical awards ==
- Best Art Director – Sabbani Rama Krishna for Rangasthalam

== Critics' choice awards ==
Telugu cinema

- Best Actor – Vijay Deverakonda – Geetha Govindam
- Best Actress – Samantha Akkineni – Rangasthalam

Tamil Cinema

- Best Actor – Jayam Ravi – Adanga Maru
- Best Actress – Aishwarya Rajesh – Kanaa

Kannada cinema

- Best Actor – Yash – K.G.F Chapter – 1
- Best Actress – Manvitha Harish – Tagaru

Malayalam cinema

- Best Actor – Prithviraj Sukumaran – Koode
- Best Actress – Trisha – Hey Jude

== Special Jury Awards ==
- Special Appreciation Jury Award : Sudheer Babu – Sammohanam
- Special Jury for Outstanding performance : Kathir – Pariyerum Perumal
- Special Jury for Child Artist (Tamil) : Master Aarav Ravi – Tik Tik Tik

== Generation Next Awards ==
- Entertainer of the Year : TBA
- Generation Next Superstar : TBA
- Most Popular Star in the Middle East : Mohanlal
- Popular Celebrity on Social Media : Vijay Devarakonda
- Style Icon of the Year : Yash and Samantha Akkineni

== Presenters ==
Award	Presenter
SIIMA Award for Best Male Playback Singer (Telugu)	Pragnya; Jayesh Ranjan
SIIMA Award for Best Female Playback Singer (Telugu)	Nidhhi Agerwal; Pannagabharana
SIIMA Award for Best Lyricist (Telugu)	Sanjjanaa Galrani
SIIMA Award for Best Music Director (Telugu)	Nidhi P. Sai Kumar
SIIMA Award for Best Art Director (Telugu)	Nidhi P. Sai Kumar
SIIMA Award for Best Female Debut (Telugu)	Sandeep Kishan; Tejaswini Prakash
SIIMA Award for Best Male Debut (Telugu)	Andrea Jeremiah; Adusumilli Brinda Prasad
SIIMA Award for Best Debut Director (Telugu)	Vivek Krishnani; Induri Vishnu
SIIMA Award for Best Cinematographer (Telugu)	Allu Aravind; Chamundeswari Nathan
SIIMA Award for Best Supporting Actress (Telugu)	Shriya Saran
SIIMA Award for Best Supporting Actor (Telugu)	Shriya Saran
SIIMA Award for Best Comedian (Telugu)	Hebah Patel
SIIMA Award for Best Actor in a Negative Role (Telugu)	Hebah Patel
SIIMA Award for Best Film (Telugu)	Ravindra Reddy; Radhika Sarathkumar
SIIMA Award for Best Director (Telugu)	Allu Aravind; Tirumala Reddy
Special Appreciation Jury Award	Allu Aravind; Tirumala Reddy
Style Icon of the Year	Ryan Fernandes
Popular Celebrity on Social Media	Chanditha Nambiar
SIIMA Award for Best Actor (Telugu)	Radhika Sarathkumar; Ryan Fernandes
SIIMA Award for Best Actress (Telugu)	Chanditha Nambiar
