= Anurag Kulkarni =

Indian playback singer

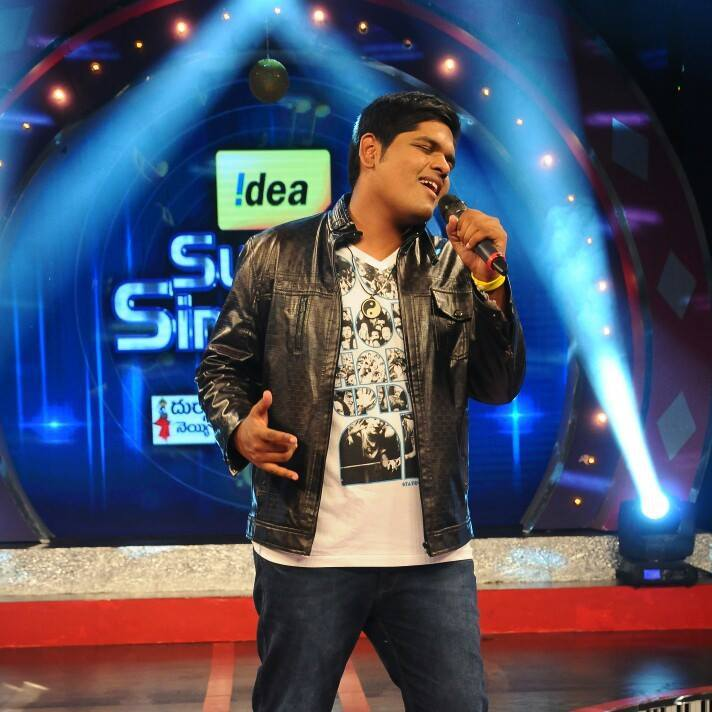
- Kulkarni at the Idea Super Singer Season 8

Background information
- Born: 1992 or 1993 (age 33–34); Kamareddy, Andhra Pradesh, India (now in Telangana, India)
- Occupation: Playback Singer
- Instruments: Vocals; Piano
- Years active: 2015–present
- Spouse: Ramya Behara (m. 2024)

Anurag Kulkarni is an Indian playback singer known for his work in Telugu films.

== Early life and career ==
Anurag Kulkarni was born in Kamareddy, India. He learned Hindustani classical music from Kakunoori Jangaiah, a renowned Hindustani vocalist and guru from Hyderabad, and was trained in the kirana gharana style of singing.

In January 2015, the Telugu reality singing competition, Idea Super Singer Season 8, was won by Anurag. In a 2021 interview with Cinema Express, Anurag reported having recorded more than 800 songs in the Telugu language by August 2021.

== Discography ==
List of songs recorded
Year	Work	Song	Composer(s)
2015	Jagannatakam	"Manasuna"	Ajay Arsada
2016	Lacchimdeviki O Lekkundi	"Crazy"	M. M. Keeravani
2016	Hyper	"Baby Doll"	Ghibran
2016	Aatadukundam Raa	"Round and Round"	Anup Rubens
2016	Ism	"Ism"	Anup Rubens
2017	Sathamanam Bhavati	"Mellaga Tellarindoi"	Mickey J. Meyer
2017	Luckunnodu	"O Siri Malli"	Praveen Lakkaraju
2017	Winner	"Suyaa Suyaa"	S. Thaman
2017	Kittu Unnadu Jagratha	"Ardhamaindha"	Anup Rubens
2017	Aakatayi	"Pranam Paravana"	Mani Sharma
2017	Katamarayudu	"Mira Mira Meesam"	Anup Rubens
2017	Mister	"Sayyori Sayyori"	Mickey J. Meyer
2017	Mister	"Jhoomore Jhoomore"	Mickey J. Meyer
2017	Fashion Designer s/o Ladies Tailor	"Kanulemito"	Mani Sharma
2017	Jayadev	"Nuvvu Undipo"	Mani Sharma
2017	Patel S. I. R.	"Manase Tholisari"	DJ Vasanth
2017	Vaisakham	"Vaisakham"	DJ Vasanth
2017	Vaisakham	"Come On Country Chilaka"	DJ Vasanth
2017	Darsakudu	"Anaganaga oka Raju"	Sai Karthik
2017	Paisa Vasool	"Paisa Vasool"	Anup Rubens
2017	Lie	"Miss Sunshine"	Mani Sharma
2017	Lie	"Freedom"	Mani Sharma
2017	Oye Ninne	"Manasa Manasa"	Shekar Chandra
2017	Balakrishnudu	"Rende Rendu Kallu"	Mani Sharma
2017	Dongodochadu	"Nee Choope"	Vidyasagar
2017	Okka Kshanam	"So Many So Many"	Mani Sharma
2017	Okka Kshanam	"Gundello Sudulu"	Mani Sharma
2018	Ego	"Kurrodu Perfect"	Sai Karthik
2018	Rangula Ratnam	"Rey Vishnu", "Birthday"	Sricharan Pakala
2018	Chalo	"Choosi Choodangane"	Mahathi Sagar
2018	MLA	"Girl Friend"	Mani Sharma
2018	MLA	"Yuddham Yuddham"	Mani Sharma
2018	Satya Gang	"Manase Kanaleva"	Prabhas Nimmala
2018	Nadigaiyar Thilagam	"Mauna Mazhayile"	Mickey J. Meyer
2018	Nadigaiyar Thilagam	"Mahanati"	Mickey J. Meyer
2018	Mahanati	"Mooga Manasulu"	Mickey J. Meyer
2018	Mahanati	"Mahanati"	Mickey J. Meyer
2018	Ee Nagaraniki Emaindhi	"Aagi Aagi"	Vivek Sagar
2018	RX 100	"Pillaa Raa"	Chaitan Bharadwaj
2018	Vijetha	"Aakaasaanni Thaakey"	Harshavardhan Rameshwar
2018	Srinivasa Kalyanam	"Modalaudhaam"	Mickey J. Meyer
2018	Srinivasa Kalyanam	"Something"	Mickey J. Meyer
2018	Geetha Govindam	"Tanemandhe Tanemandhe"	Gopi Sundar
2018	C/o Kancharapalem	"Ashaa Paasham"	Sweekar agasthi
2018	Shailaja Reddy Alludu	"Gold Rangu Pilla"	Gopi Sundar
2018	Devadas	"Vaaru Veeru"	Mani Sharma
2018	Devadas	"Laka Laka Lakumikara"	Mani Sharma
2018	Devadas	"Manasedo Vethukuthu Undi"	Mani Sharma
2018	Subrahmanyapuram	"Ee Rojila"	Shekar Chandra
2019	Mithai	"Liberation"	Vivek Sagar
2019	Suryakantham	"Friday Night Baby"	Mark K Robin
2019	Majili	"Maayya Maaya"	Gopi Sundar
2019	Sita	"Nijamena"	Anup Rubens
2019	Nuvvu Thopu Raa	"Nakentho Nachinde"	Suresh Bobbili
2019	Nuvvu Thopu Raa	"Chal Chal Pada"	Suresh Bobbili
2019	Agent Sai Srinivasa Athreya	"Sherlock Holmes"	Mark K Robin
2019	Mallesham	"Dhana Dhana Dhan"	Mark K Robin
2019	Mallesham	"Aa Challani'	Mark K Robin
2019	Mallesham	"Sethikochina Bidda"	Mark K Robin
2019	Brochevarevarura	"Brochevare"	Vivek Sagar
2019	Oh! Baby	"Oh! Baby"	Mickey J. Meyer
2019	ISmart Shankar	"Ismart Theme"	Mani Sharma
2019	ISmart Shankar	"Undipo"	Mani Sharma
2019	Manmadhudu 2	"Maa Chakkani Pellanta"	Chaitan Bharadwaj
2019	Kousalya Krishnamurthy	"Ooge Pachani"	Dhibu Ninan Thomas
2019	Gaddalakonda Ganesh	"Jarra Jarra"	Mickey J. Meyer
2019	Gaddalakonda Ganesh	"Gagana Veedhilo"	Mickey J. Meyer
2019	Gaddalakonda Ganesh	"Waka Waka"	Mickey J. Meyer
2019	Chanakya	"Gulabhi"	Vishal Chandrasekhar
2019	Sye Raa Narasimha Reddy	"Jaago Narasimha"	Amit Trivedi
2019	Sye Raa Narasimha Reddy (Kannada dub)	"Jaago Narasimha"	Amit Trivedi
2019	Sye Raa Narasimha Reddy (Malayalam dub)	"Neram Aagatham"	Amit Trivedi
2019	Sye Raa Narasimha Reddy (Tamil dub)	"Paaraai Narasimha Nee Paaraai"	Amit Trivedi
2019	Oorantha Anukuntunnaru	"Kanna (Reprise)"	K. M. Radha Krishnan
2019	Whistle (Telugu dub)	"Neethone"	A. R. Rahman
2019	Meeku Maathrame Cheptha	"Chaalu Chaalu'	Sivakumar
2019	Meeku Maathrame Cheptha	"Nuvve Hero"	Sivakumar
2019	Thipparaa Meesam	"Radha Ramanam"	Suresh Bobbili
2019	Raja Vaaru Rani Gaaru	"Title Song"	Jay Krish
2019	Raja Vaaru Rani Gaaru	"Pain Song"	Jay Krish
2019	Raja Vaaru Rani Gaaru	"Nammela Lede"	Jay Krish
2019	Arjun Suravaram	"Kanne Kanne"	Sam C. S.
2019	90ML	"90ML Title Song"	Anup Rubens
2019	Hulchul	"Oh Cheliyaa"	Bharath Madhusudanan
2019	Venky Mama	"Nuvvu Nenu"	S. Thaman
2019	Ruler	"Yaala Yaala"	Chirrantan Bhatt
2019	Iddari Lokam Okate	"You Are My Heart Beat"	Mickey J. Meyer
2019	Iddari Lokam Okate	"Hola Hola"	Mickey J. Meyer
2019	Athade Srimannarayana	"Narayana Narayana"	Charan Raj
2020	Ala Vaikunthapurramuloo	"Ramuloo Ramulaa"	S. Thaman
2020	Entha Manchivaadavuraa	"O Chinna Navve Chaalu"	Gopi Sundar
2020	Valayam	"Ninnu Chusake"	Shekar Chandra
2020	Bheeshma	"Singles Anthem"	Mahathi Sagar
2020	Bheeshma	"Sara Sari"	Mahathi Sagar
2020	Amaram Akhilam Prema	"Tholi Tholi"	Radhan
2020	Colour Photo	"Arere Aakasham"	Kaala Bhairava
2020	Aakaasam Nee Haddhu Ra (Telugu dub)	"Pilla Pulli"	G. V. Prakash Kumar
2020	Ksheera Sagara Madhanam	"Nee Peru"	AjayArasada
2021	Red	"Nuvve Nuvve"	Mani Sharma
2021	C/o Kaadhal	"Katril Aadum"	Sweekar Agasthi
2021	Love Life & Pakodi	"Vedi Pakodi"	Pavan
2021	Love Life & Pakodi	"Ee Payanam"	Pavan
2021	Naandhi	"Devathalantha"	Sricharan Pakala
2021	Akshara	"Asuruladara"	Suresh Bobbili
2021	SR Kalyanamandapam	"Chukkala Chunni"	Chaitan Bharadwaj
2021	SR Kalyanamandapam	""Sigguendukura Mama""	Chaitan Bharadwaj
2021	Tongi Tongi Chudamaku Chandamama	"Tadabadi Poyanemo"	Hari Gowra
2021	Dear Megha	"Aamani Unte Pakkana"	Hari Gowra
2021	Ardha Shathabdham	"Kalam Adigey Manishante Evaru"	Nawfal Raja AIS
2021	Ishq: Not A Love Story	"Aagalekapotunna"	Mahathi Swara Sagar Remake of Malayalam film Ishq: Not A Love Story
2021	Ishq: Not A Love Story	"Cheekati Chirujwaalai"	Mahathi Swara Sagar Remake of Malayalam film Ishq: Not A Love Story
2021	Natyam	"Venuvulo"	Shravan Bharadwaj
2021	Nee Jathaga	"Gum Gum Ganapathi"	Pavan
2021	Seetimaarr	"Seetimaarr Title Song"	Mani Sharma
2021	Republic	"Gaana of Republic"	Mani Sharma
2021	Republic	"Jor Se"	Mani Sharma
2021	Maestro	"Baby O Baby"	Mahathi Swara Sagar
2021	Narappa	"Ooru Natta"	Mani Sharma
2021	Thalaivii (Telugu dub)	"Kumari Idhi Nee Daari"	G. V. Prakash Kumar
2021	Thalaivii (Telugu dub)	"Ra ThalaiviI"	G. V. Prakash Kumar
2021	Raja Raja Chora	"Maaya Maaya"	Vivek Sagar
2021	Love Story	"Nee Chitram Choosi"	Pawan Ch.
2021	Raja Vikramarka	"Rama Kanavemira"	Prashanth R Vihari
2021	Missing	"Khullam Khulla"	Ajay Arasada
2021	Virgin Story	"Vayari O Vayari"	Gowra Hari
2021	Shyam Singha Roy	"Rise of Shyam"	Mickey J. Meyer
2021	Shyam Singha Roy	"Sirivennela"	Mickey J. Meyer
2021	Shyam Singha Roy	"Pranavalaya"	Mickey J. Meyer
2021	Shyam Singha Roy (Tamil dub)	"Rise of Shyam"	Mickey J. Meyer
2021	Shyam Singha Roy (Tamil dub)	"Jagadeeshwara Devi"	Mickey J. Meyer
2021	Shyam Singha Roy (Malayalam dub)	"Rise of Shyam"	Mickey J. Meyer
2021	Shyam Singha Roy (Malayalam dub)	"Pranavamrutha"	Mickey J. Meyer
2021	Shyam Singha Roy (Malayalam dub)	"O Chandrika"	Mickey J. Meyer
2021	Shyam Singha Roy (Kannada dub)	"Rise of Shyam"	Mickey J. Meyer
2021	Shyam Singha Roy (Kannada dub)	"Mugulu Nagavalle"	Mickey J. Meyer
2022	Sehari	"Subbalachmi"	Prashanth R Vihari
2022	Valimai	"Naanga Vera Maari"	Yuvan Shankar Raja
2022	Valimai (D) - Telugu	"Naadhi Vere Maata"	Yuvan Shankar Raja
2022	Valimai (D) - Hindi	"Dhana Dhani"	Yuvan Shankar Raja
2022	Radhe Shyam	"Ninnele"	Justin Prabhakaran
2022	Radhe Shyam (Tamil)	"Unnaalae"	Justin Prabhakaran
2022	Radhe Shyam (Kannada)	"Ninnale"	Justin Prabhakaran
2022	Radhe Shyam (Malayalam)	"Ninnaale"	Justin Prabhakaran
2022	Acharya	"Neelambari"	Mani Sharma
2022	Mr. Pregnant	"Hey Cheli"	Shravan Bharadwaj
2022	Maaran	"Annana Thaalaattum"	G. V. Prakash Kumar
2022	Atithi Devo Bhava	"Ninnu Chudagane"	Shekar Chandra
2022	Ante Sundaraniki	"Entha Chithram"	Vivek Sagar
2022	Liger	"Akdi Pakdi"	Lijo George, DJ Chetas, Sunil Kashyap
2022	Sita Ramam	"Kaanunna Kalyanam"	Vishal Chandrashekhar
2023	Ghar Banduk Biryani	"Gun Gun"	AV Prafullachandra
2023	Waltair Veerayya	"Veerayya Title Track "	Devi Sri Prasad
2023	Animal (dub)	”Yaalo Yaalaa"	Anantha Sriram
2023	Animal (dub)	"Yaalo Yaalaa[Extended Film Version]"	Anantha Sriram
2023	Animal (dub)	"Appa Nee Nagu"	Varadaraj Chikkaballapura
2023	Animal (dub)	""Appa Nee Nagu"[Extended Film Version]"	Varadaraj Chikkaballapura
2023	Hi Nanna	"Samayama"	Hesham Abdul Wahab
2023	Hi Nanna (Tamil dub)	"Nizhaliye","Vivarane"	Hesham Abdul Wahab
2023	Hi Nanna (Kannada dub)	"Geleyane"	Hesham Abdul Wahab
2023	Hi Nanna (Malayalam dub)	"Hridayame"	Hesham Abdul Wahab
2024	Bhoothaddam Bhaskar Narayana	"Dappukotti Cheppukona"	Vijai Bulganin
2024	Tantra	"Dheere Dheere"	RR Dhruvan
2024	Harom Hara	"Harom Harom Hara"	Chaitan Bharadwaj
2024	Honeymoon Express	"Prema"	Kalyani Malik
2024	Darling	"Sun Chaliya"	Vivek Sagar
2024	Aay	"Ranganayaki"	Ram Miriyala
2024	Double iSmart	"Steppa Maar"	Mani Sharma
2024	Mr. Bachchan	"Reppal Dappul"	Mickey J. Meyer
2024	Amaran (Telugu dub)	"Hey Rangule"	G. V. Prakash Kumar
2025	Baapu	"Kangaree Padaku Ra"	RR Dhruvan
2025	Court	"Premalo"	Vijai Bulganin
2025	Dilruba	"Aggipulle"	Sam C. S.
2025	Robinhood	"Adhi Dha Surprisu"	G. V. Prakash Kumar
2025	28 Degree Celsius	"Theeru Maaruthondhe"	Shravan Bharadwaj
2025	Chaurya Paatham	"Okkasariga"	Davzand
2025	Dooradarshini	"Naa Needa Veluthundhaa"	Anand Gurrana
2025	Meghalu Cheppina Prema Katha	"Saage Nade"	Justin Prabhakaran
2025	HIT: The Third Case	"Abki Baar Arjun Sarkaar"	Mickey J. Meyer
2025	Bakasura Restaurant	"Jathiyam"	Vikas Badisa
2025	Thammudu	"Bhuu Antuu Bhuutham"	B. Ajaneesh Loknath
2025	Uppu Kappurambu	"Yaadunaavo"	Sweekar Agasthi
2025	Su From So (Kannada)	"Danks Anthem"	Sumedh K
2025	Kanya Kumari	"Yadha Yadha Savvadi"	Ravi Nidamarthy
2025	Premistunnaa	"Arere"	Siddharth Salur
2025	Raju Weds Rambai	"Rambai Neemeedha Naku"	Suresh Bobbili
2025	Dhandoraa	"Pilla"	Mark K Robin
2026	Anaganaga Oka Raju	"Raju Gaari Pelli Ro"	Mickey J. Meyer
2026	Gaayapadda Simham	"Premaki Pulihora"	Sweekar Agasthi
2026	Brindavihari (Kannada)	"Rama Rama Deva"	Hesham Abdul Wahab

== Filmography ==
=== As voice actor ===
Year	Film	Role	Dub-over voice for
2019	Aladdin	Aladdin (singing voice)	Mena Massoud

== Personal life ==
Anurag married his co-artist Ramya Behara in November 2024.

== Awards and nominations ==
List of awards and nominations received
Year	Award	Category	Work	Result	Ref.
2018	Zee Cine Awards Telugu 2018	Best Playback Singer – Male	"Pillaa Raa" from RX 100 and "Mahanati" from Mahanati	Won	
2019	65th Filmfare Awards South	Best Male Playback Singer – Telugu	"Pillaa Raa" from RX 100	Nominated	
2019	17th Santosham Film Awards	Best Male Playback Singer	"Pillaa Raa" from RX 100	Won	
2019	8th South Indian International Movie Awards	Best Male Playback Singer – Telugu	"Pillaa Raa" from RX 100	Won	
2021	9th South Indian International Movie Awards	Best Male Playback Singer – Telugu	"iSmart Theme" from ISmart Shankar	Won	
2022	10th South Indian International Movie Awards	Best Playback Singer – Male	"Nee Chitram Choosi from Love Story	Nominated	
2024	69th Filmfare Awards South	Best Male Playback Singer – Telugu	"Samayama" from Hi Nanna	Nominated	
