= Guna 369 =

2019 Telugu action drama film

- Theatrical release poster
- Directed by: Arjun Jandyala
- Written by: Arjun Jandyala
- Produced by: Anil Kadiyala; Tirumal Reddy
- Starring: Kartikeya; Anagha
- Cinematography: Raam Reddy
- Edited by: Tammiraju
- Music by: Chaitan Bharadwaj
- Production companies: Gnapika Entertainments; SG Movie Makers; Sprint Films
- Release date: 2 August 2019
- Country: India
- Language: Telugu

Guna 369 is a 2019 Telugu-language action thriller film directed by Arjun Jandyala and produced by Anil Kadiyala and Tirumal Reddy. The film stars Kartikeya Gummakonda and Anagha (In her Telugu debut) in the lead roles. The soundtrack was composed by Chaitan Bharadwaj with cinematography by Raam Reddy and editing by Tammiraju.

Guna 369 was based on a true incident and was released on 2 August 2019 to mixed reviews from critics.

== Plot ==
Guna is a nonviolent person who works with his close friend Battu at a granite factory. While riding to attend his B. Tech. exams, Guna meets Geetha and falls in love with her. Guna repeatedly causes his phone to malfunction to see Geetha, who works at a phone store. Guna gives compliments to Geetha, who eventually reciprocates his love. Guna finds an online photo of Sashi, who attended school with Battu, and believes that Sashi may be a good romantic match for his sister. Guna and Battu visit Sashi at his medical shop. After the visit, Guna is convinced that Sashi is a perfect match for his sister.

Meanwhile, Sashi and his gang get into trouble due to a brawl with a gangster named Gaddala Gunta Radha. When Sashi learns that Guna has known Radha since childhood, he pleads for Guna's help. Guna agrees and arranges a meeting with Radha at the granite quarry so that Sashi can apologize to Radha. Radha arrives alone and viciously slaps Sashi, as Guna asks Radha to stop. Unknown to Guna and Radha, Sashi's gang had planned to kill Radha in an ambush. As Sashi's gang holds Guna down, Sashi beheads Radha. Guna is later imprisoned, while Sashi avoids charges. Guna is released from prison, where he goes to Geetha's house and learns that she died while Guna was imprisoned.

Enraged, Guna tells his father that he will exact revenge on Radha's real killers and visits Geetha's house, where Radha's henchmen attack Guna and his family. Although Guna prevails, his father is injured and ends up in the hospital. Guna brings Radha's men to Radha's mother, where he explains to her that he did not kill her son. Radha's mother gives her a week's deadline to bring Sashi's gang to her. Guna finds Sashi's men hiding in SI Shivaji's house and attacks them. Battu advises Guna to hand the killers over to Radha's mother instead, but Guna refuses.

Guna says that Shivaji revealed that Battu had encouraged Sashi to kill Radha, who had humiliated his family earlier. Guna says he also learned that Geetha had come to Battu for advice about her father's insistence on marrying someone else. Instead of advising her, Battu and Sashi recorded all of them assaulting her. Fearing the consequences of the video release and blackmail, Geetha committed suicide. Forced by Guna, Shivaji films Guna beheading Battu, Sashi, and his gang. Guna surrenders to the police but is praised for killing the perpetrators and is eventually released from prison.

== Cast ==
- Kartikeya as Guna
- Anagha as Geetha
- Vaayu Veer as Sashi, Guna's friend
- Mahesh Achanta as Battu, Guna's friend
- Adhitya as Gaddala Gunta Radha
- Naresh as Guna's father
- Hema as Guna's mother
- Kaumudi Nemani as Guna's sister
- Saakshi Siva as Geetha's father
- Manju Bhargavi as Radha's mother
- Sivaji Raja as SI Shivaji

== Soundtrack ==
The music is composed by Chaitan Bharadwaj in his second collaboration with Kartikeya after RX 100.

No.	Title	Lyrics	Singer(s)	Length
1.	"Bujji Bangaram"	Anantha Sriram	Nakash Aziz, Deepthi Parthasarathy	3:28
2.	"Tholi Parichayama Idhi"	Subham Viswanath	Haricharan
3.	"Manasukidi Garalam"	Ramajogayya Sastry	Vijay Yesudas, Shweta Mohan
4.	"Dheveri"	Ramajogayya Sastry	Gowtham Bharadwaj, Ramya Behara
5.	"Dhamaruka"	Subham Viswanath	Kaala Bhairava
6.	"Usuremo"	Kalyan Chakravarthy Tripuraneni	Mohana Bhogaraju

== Reception ==
The Hans India gave 3.5/5 stars and wrote the film as a "routine commercial formula" and concluded as an "average movie which can be watched once." 123Telugu gave 2.75/5 stars and wrote "Guna 369 is a message-oriented mass film which may find takers in single screens. The twists unveiled in the second half are totally unexpected and are executed decently. But on the flip side, lack of gripping narration in the later part make the film just an okay watch for the weekend."

Y. Sunitha Chowdhary of The Hindu wrote "An uninspiring romantic track mars the film that actually has a decent storyline. Despite having a relevant social issue, the predictability of the narration is a dampener." Neeshita Nyayapati of The Times of India gave 2/5 stars and wrote that the film as a "tedious and long-drawn filled that comes to a gory conclusion".

Srividya Palaparthi of Cinema Express gave 2/5 stars and wrote "Guna 369 tries hard and fails miserably to be the fabled commercial film with all the 'elements' making it a romantic-comedy-action-family-revenge-drama. Despite the many routes that the film takes, not one of them is effective enough to come through."
