= Kartikeya Gummakonda =

Indian actor

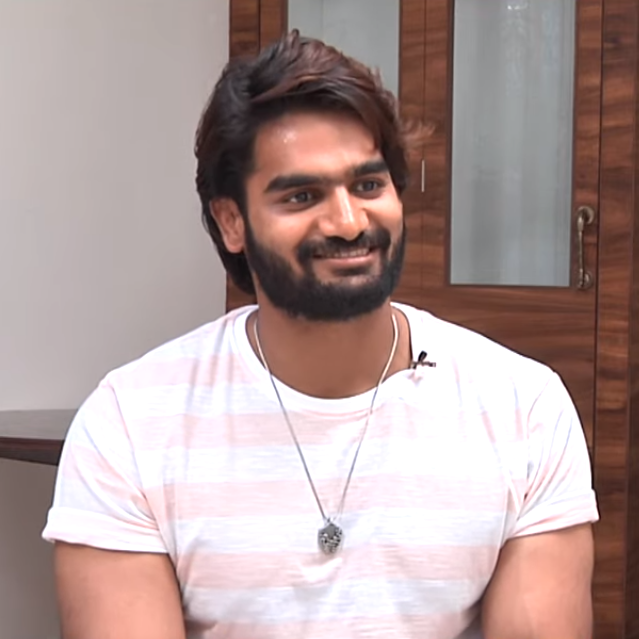
- Gummakonda in 2019
- Born: Gummakonda Karthikeya Reddy; 21 September 1992 (age 33); Hyderabad, Andhra Pradesh (now Telangana), India
- Education: NIT Warangal
- Occupation: Actor
- Years active: 2017–present
- Spouse: Lohitha Reddy (m. 2021)

Kartikeya Gummakonda (born 21 September 1992) is an Indian actor who predominantly works in Telugu films. He made his acting debut in 2017 with Prematho Mee Karthik and is noted for his performance in the 2018 romantic action film RX100.

He then appeared in films such as Hippi, Guna 369, Nani's Gang Leader, Valimai, Bedurulanka 2012 and Bhaje Vaayu Vegam.

== Early life ==
Kartikeya Gummakonda was born and brought up in Hyderabad. His parents own a school in the neighbourhood of Vanasthalipuram, namely Nagarjuna group of schools. After graduating from National Institute of Technology, Warangal, he choose to pursue a career in acting.

== Personal life ==
In August 2021, Gummakonda got engaged to his girlfriend Lohitha Reddy whom he met during college in 2010. The couple got married on 21 November 2021.

== Career ==
Gummakonda made his debut with Prematho Mee Karthik (2017), and then starred in a few films, none of which were theatrically released. He became noted with RX 100 (2018) directed by Ajay Bhupathi. The film was a commercial success which earned him recognition. He then appeared in Hippi, Guna 369, Nani's Gang Leader and 90ML, with all four releasing in 2019. Gummakonda worked out in order to achieve authenticity in the role of a kickboxer for Hippi. Guna 369 is about a real incident that took place in Ongole. In a review of the film by The Times of India, the reviewer wrote that "Karthikeya does his best to pour life into the titular character".

Gummakonda made his first appearance as a villain opposite Nani in Gang Leader. He landed the role after the film's director Vikram Kumar liked his acting in RX 100, and he received positive reviews for his portrayal of Dev. Despite enjoying the craze, his intent to evolve as a performer was clearly seen in his antagonist role from the film. Post this success, he signed on to play an interesting lead role in 90ML. In a review of the film by The Times of India, the reviewer wrote that "Kartikeya gets a role that requires him to dance like a dream and fight like a pro for the most part and he aces it completely." In 2021, he played Basti Balaraju in Chaavu Kaburu Challaga, a hearse driver who falls in love with a widow. Reviewing his performance, a critic from The Indian Express stated: "Kartikeya wins applauds for his depiction of Basthi Balaraju."

In 2021, he starred in Raja Vikramarka where he plays the role of an NIA officer. Gummakonda played the antagonist in the Ajith-starrer Valimai, which marks his debut in Tamil cinema. He was next seen in the village dramedy Bedurulanka 2012, which released in the second half of 2023 and emerged as a commercially successful film.

Bhaje Vaayu Vegam is his latest release which was produced by UV Creations and directed by debutant Prashanth Reddy.

== Filmography ==
- All films are in Telugu, unless listed otherwise.

Year	Title	Role	Notes	Ref.
2017	Prematho Mee Karthik	Karthik		
2018	RX 100	Shiva		
2019	Hippi	Devdas Nadimpalli (Hippi)		
2019	Guna 369	Guna		
2019	Nani's Gang Leader	Dev		
2019	90ML	Deva Das		
2021	Chaavu Kaburu Challaga	Basthi Balaraju		
2021	Raja Vikramarka	Raja Vikramarka		
2022	Valimai	Naren / Wolfranga	Tamil debut	
2023	Bedurulanka 2012	Shiva Sankara Vara Prasad		
2024	Bhaje Vaayu Vegam	Goppula Venkata Ramana		

=== Television ===
Year	Title	Role	Network	Notes	Ref.
2020	Bigg Boss 4	Guest / Performer (Dance)	Star Maa	Episode 49	

== Awards and nominations ==
Year	Award	Category	Film	Result
2018	Zee Cine Awards Telugu	Best Find of the Year - Male	RX 100	Won
2019	17th Santosham Film Awards	Best Actor	RX 100	Won
2021	9th South Indian International Movie Awards	Best Actor in a Negative Role – Telugu	Nani's Gang Leader	Won
