= Bedurulanka 2012 =

2023 film directed by Clax

- Theatrical release poster
- Directed by: Clax
- Written by: Clax
- Produced by: Ravindra Benerjee Muppaneni (Benny); Avaneendra Upadrasta
- Starring: Kartikeya; Neha Shetty
- Cinematography: Sai Prakash Ummadisingu; Sunny Kurapati
- Edited by: Viplav Nyshadam
- Music by: Mani Sharma
- Production company: Loukya Entertainments
- Release date: 25 August 2023
- Running time: 149 minutes
- Country: India
- Language: Telugu
- Box office: ₹12.41 crore

Bedurulanka 2012 is a 2023 Indian Telugu-language comedy drama film directed by Clax. It was produced by Ravindra Benerjee Muppaneni (Benny), under Loukya Entertainments. It stars Kartikeya, Neha Shetty, Ajay Ghosh, Srikanth Iyengar, L. B. Sriram in pivotal roles.

The film has music composed by Mani Sharma. The film released theatrically on 25 August 2023 and was a commercial success at the box office, grossing over ₹12.41 crore worldwide.

== Premise ==
Towards the end of the 2012 phenomenon in the remote village of Bedurulanka, three men named Bhushanam, Brahmam and Daniel plan an elaborate religious con. Upon Bhushanam's instructions, Brahmam (a Hindu astrologer) and Daniel (the son of the village's church father) claim that they were blessed by the divine with a solution to survive the upcoming doomsday. Due to the constant scare about the same in the television, the villagers and their local government's president, follow Brahmam and Daniel depending on their own religious beliefs. However one of the natives Shiva, who returns to Bedurulanka after resigning from his job in Hyderabad, finds the phenomenon a conspiracy theory and refuses to believe in either of them, angering both Bhushanam and the president.

Shiva and the president's daughter Chitra rekindle their relationship and hope to get married. Bhushanam, who realises that his wealth has been steadily diminishing and has an eye on the president's wealth, wants his son Kasiraju to marry Chitra and actively tries to gain the president's approval for the same. Kasiraju leads a double life and poses as an obedient and respectful person before the public, which the president favours over Shiva, who has a reputation of having a caustic tongue and speaking his mind. While Kasiraju himself is not interested in Chitra and is already in a relationship with her friend Padma, he agrees to the alliance to spite Shiva, on whom he had a grudge since childhood.

Days before 21 December, Bhushanam instructs Brahmam and Daniel to ask their followers to donate all their gold ornaments to make a lingam and a cross out of them and bury them into the river as they watch, and claim this as the atonement prayer for escaping the doomsday. All the villagers, except Shiva, donate their gold ornaments using which the lingam and the cross are made. Shiva is asked to either donate or leave the village, and he chooses the latter after declaring his love for Chitra before the president and the villagers. The president arranges the marriage of Kasiraju and Chitra on the night of 21 December, the eve of the doomsday, believing that Brahmam and Daniel would save them all.

Bhushanam and the duo replace the gold lingam and cross with the fake ones, intending to sell them and go to Bangkok. On the morning of 21 December, the villagers, who believe the buried ones to be real, believe that the doomsday has been averted and they celebrate. That night, as Kasiraju and Chitra are about to get married, Shiva returns to Bedurulanka and arranges bombs across the village with the help of his friends. He also arranges for a fake news telecast presented by one of his friends, which confirms that several parts of the world are being destroyed in a deluge. As the bombs detonate one by one, the marriage is called off and the villagers, instigated by Shiva, start chasing Brahmam and Daniel. Chitra too joins Shiva and his friends in the plan, and the group ensures Bhushanam and the duo come out clean. Kasiraju also drops his cover and proposes to Padma, apologising to Shiva and Chitra. As the villagers prepare themselves for death and reveal their intimate secrets to one and all, they all celebrate the end of the world. Next morning, they wake up to a news telecast by Shiva, Chitra, the president and their friends who reveal the truth about the bombings and the fake news, and announce the marriage of Shiva and Chitra that night. As Shiva and Chitra get married, the villagers who now know all the uncomfortable secrets about each other, start adjusting to their new lives.

== Cast ==
- Kartikeya as Shiva Sankara Vara Prasad
- Neha Shetty as Chitra
- Ajay Ghosh as Bhushanam
- Srikanth Iyengar as Brahmam
- Jabardasth Ramprasad as Daniel
- Vennela Kishore
- L. B. Sriram
- Satya
- Goparaju Ramana as Village President
- Rajkumar Kasireddy as Kasiraju, Bhushanam's son
- Divya Narni as Chitra's friend
- Surabhi Prabhavati as Chitra's mother
- Getup Srinu as News Anchor
- B. V. S. Ravi as Film producer
- Vanitha Reddy as Savitri

== Production ==
=== Development ===
The title and pre-look of the film was released on 28 November 2022. First look of the film was released on 30 November. Makers released the first look of Neha Shetty as Chitra on 5 December on occasion of her birthday. Kartikeya started dubbing for the film on 12 December 2022. A glimpse of the film was released on 21 December. Shooting of the film was wrapped up on 23 January 2023.

=== Cast and crew ===
Kartikeya Gummakonda and Neha Shetty play the lead roles. Ajay Ghosh, Srikanth Iyengar, L. B. Sriram are among the supporting cast.

== Music ==
The music rights to the film are owned by Sony Music South. Mani Sharma composed both the music and the background score for the film.
