= Grrr (film) =

- Theatrical release poster
- Directed by: Jay K
- Written by: Jay K
- Produced by: Shaji Nadesan; Arya
- Starring: Kunchacko Boban; Suraj Venjaramoodu
- Cinematography: Jayesh Nair
- Edited by: Vivek Harshan
- Music by: Dawn Vincent; Kailas Menon; Tony Tarz
- Production company: August Cinema
- Release date: 14 June 2024
- Running time: 119 minutes
- Country: India
- Language: Malayalam

Grrr (transl. Roar) is a 2024 Indian Malayalam language survival comedy film directed by Jay K. Based on the true story of a man who jumped into the lion enclosure in Thiruvananthapuram Zoo in 2018, the film stars Kunchacko Boban and Suraj Venjaramoodu. It was released on 14 June 2024 where it received mixed reviews from critics and struggled at the box office. It was a box office bomb.

== Premise ==
Rejimon "Reji" Nadar became drunk following heartbreak over his lover Rachana due to caste issues. Meanwhile, Haridas Nair, the employer at a zoo, grappled with his own problems stemming from corruption. Later, he learns that Reji is in the lion Darshan's den, and he rushes to save him, only to find himself in a struggle for survival as the news media cover the unfolding events.

== Cast ==
- Kunchacko Boban as Rejimon Nadar
- Suraj Venjaramoodu as KJ Haridas Nair
- MoJo as Darshan
- Shruti Ramachandran as Mridula Nair
- Anagha as Rachana
- Rajesh Madhavan as Anas
- Manju Pillai as Fauziya Fathima
- Shobi Thilakan as Iravikutty Pillai
- Senthil Krishna as CI Kamalesh
- Alencier Ley Lopez as Thambi Himagiri
- Ramesh Pisharody as TV reporter
- Parvathy R Krishna as TV reporter
- Sibi Thomas as Sujanapalan
- Ratheesh Balakrishna Poduval as Channel Head Mahesh Moorthy
- Nisthar Sait as Kazhakoottam Christopher
- Vinod Kedamangalam as Fire & Rescue Officer
- RJ Murukan as Dr. Jacob
- Gautham Sasi as Thambi Himagiri's assistant
- Mohith as Cameraman Shambu
- Jayachandran as Simon

== Production ==
MoJo, a South African lion who featured in Hollywood and Bollywood films, stars in the film. To choose a lion for the film, lions were trained and videos of the lion were sent to the film crew for approval.

== Reception ==
S.R. Praveen of The Hindu found the film "forgettable" while Riya J from The Week stated, "comic scenes mostly fall flat despite the best efforts of Suraj and Chackochan". The News Minute's Cris too was quite critical of the overall production. Vivek Santhosh of Cinema Express too was very mixed: "Just like a part of Darshan's meat is regularly stolen by the guards, denying the lion what it needs fairly, the film as a whole leaves a lot to be desired. While it soars in parts as a man vs beast tale, the lion's share of Grrr overstays its welcome." Anandu Suresh of The Indian Express wrote "an enjoyable, light-hearted film".

However Rohit Panikker of Times Now praised the film.
