= Tadap (2021 film) =

2021 Indian film by Milan Luthria

- Theatrical release poster
- Directed by: Milan Luthria
- Written by: Rajat Arora, Muhammad Asif Ali
- Story by: Ajay Bhupathi
- Based on: RX100 (2018) by Ajay Bhupathi
- Produced by: Sajid Nadiadwala; Fox Star Studios
- Starring: Ahan Shetty; Tara Sutaria
- Cinematography: Ragul Dharuman
- Edited by: Rajesh G. Pandey
- Music by: Songs: Pritam; Background Score: John Stewart Eduri
- Production companies: Fox Star Studios; Nadiadwala Grandson Entertainment
- Distributed by: Fox Star Studios
- Release date: 3 December 2021
- Running time: 126 minutes
- Country: India
- Language: Hindi
- Budget: ₹27 crore
- Box office: est. ₹34.86 crore

Tadap (transl. Yearning) is a 2021 Indian Hindi-language romantic action thriller film directed by Milan Luthria and produced by Sajid Nadiadwala under the Nadiadwala Grandson Entertainment banner, with Fox Star Studios serving as distributor and co-producer. A remake of the Telugu film RX 100 (2018), the film stars debutant Ahan Shetty and Tara Sutaria. The film released theatrically on 3 December 2021 to mixed reviews with praise towards its music, performances and action sequences but criticism towards screenplay and dialogues.

The principal photography began on 22 April 2019 in the Central Plaza theatre in the South Mumbai. Major portions of the film were shot in Mumbai and Mussoorie. The film was wrapped up on 10 March 2021.

This was the penultimate film to be released under the Fox Star Studios name before being rebranded to Star Studios on 27 May 2022.

== Plot ==
The movie starts with Ishana chasing a goon from Damodar Nautiyal's political party in Mussoorie. The goon gets badly beaten up, but Damodar refuses to file a complaint. Ishana is released from detention and his father, Daddy comes to pick him up. On their way home, Daddy advises Ishana to set up his multiplex outside of Mussoorie, but Ishana refuses. It is shown that he is reminiscing about a girl, Ramisa.

3 years ago, Ramisa came to Mussoorie from London to live with her father, Damodar, and her grandma. Damodar wins the election by 1000 votes. It is shown that Damodar and Daddy are good friends and the latter is celebrating outside of Damodar's house with Ishana and he catches Ramisa's eye. Later that night, Damodar, Daddy and Ishana are having dinner and the light goes out. Damodar tells Ishana to get Ramisa's grandmother from the house so that she doesn't slip. He instead takes Ramisa.

When everyone comes out for dinner, Ramisa and Ishana subtly start to flirt and continue that the next day. Lol is Ishana's friend who suspects that he is seeing someone and get the information out of him that he is going to see Ramisa. Soon they start seeing each other more often and share kisses. Daddy also start to suspect that Ishana is seeing someone. Ishana confesses that he is seeing Ramisa and is madly in love with her and that she is too. He urges Daddy to go to Damodar to talk about Ishana and Ramisa's marriage to which Daddy says that he will go when the time is right.

One night, Ramisa texts Ishana to come and get her at midnight. They both go to a closed cafe and have sex. When they reach Ramisa's house, Ishana asks Ramisa about them getting married. She tells him that she will talk to her father about this and kisses him goodnight. As she is leaving Damodar sees this. The next day, Ramisa doesn't call Ishana and he gets worried. Lol tells him to call Daddy and ask him to go to Ramisa's house to talk about the marriage.

After a while, Daddy calls Ishana and ask him to come to the hospital. Daddy reveals that he was in an accident and never got to go to Damodar's house. The next day Daddy sent Ishana to get some gravel for a temple that the former is building. There, Ishana gets a call from Lol that Ramisa is getting married. Ishana rushes back to Mussoorie, but the place where he was at had blasts happening and he rode his bike through the blasts.

When he reaches there, he sees Ramisa's grandmother who asks him how the decoration looks. Ishana breaks down and creates a scene. Damodar orders his men to take Ishana away so that he doesn't disrupt the wedding. He gets badly beaten up and is kept in a secluded area. In the meantime, Ramisa marries Anurag Mehta and is sent to London. By the time Ishana arrives, she is already gone.

Present day, Ishana tries to ruin Damodar's work and beats his men and he now is an aggressive and self-disruptive person. Lol, not able to see him in this condition, throws a party for his own birthday and urges Ishana to attend it. There he starts to dance with different girls and a car pulls up. It is shown that Ramisa is back from London to visit her father and she sees Ishana partying.

The next day, Lol happily tells Ishana that Ramisa is back. Ishana rushes to see her, but the police arrives and on Damodar's orders they take him away. While he is being taken away, Ishana screams that he'll meet Ramisa in the cafe, where they previously used to meet. Ishana is badly beaten up by the police and Daddy comes to take him. Ishana tells the latter that he has to go and meet Ramisa in the cafe, but she doesn't show. He goes to her house and they have an argument where she confesses that Ishana should move on. Damodar and Daddy interrupt them and Daddy slaps Ishana and takes him away. He tells Ishana that love is not taken by threatening someone and that Ramisa was scared by his behaviour. He locks Ishana in his room and forbids him from seeing Ramisa.

Outside the house, Lol asks Daddy why he is doing this to his son and Daddy confesses that the night he got into the accident, he went to Damodar's place. There he heard Ramisa telling her father and grandmother that she wants to marry Anurag as they both love each other. She reveals that they have been dating for the past two years and that he was a senior in her college and while going from there, Daddy got in the accident. Present day, Lol asks Daddy if he went to see Ramisa after that. Daddy did go to see Ramisa on her wedding day and she revealed to Daddy that Ishana was just an entertainment for her and nothing more.

Now present day, Daddy goes to Ishana's room to check on him, but he has jumped out of the window. Back at Ramisa's house, Damodar is furious that he has to keep on ordering his goons and the police to beat Ishana up only for Ramisa's happiness. Ramisa tries to reason with him and reveals that Anurag will be here in two days and that he and Ishana can't meet. Damodar is about to slap her, but controls himself and walks away.

He then holds a meeting with his rival and a police officer, who had previously beaten Ishana. Damodar promises to his rival that he will make him the next mayor and will pay for the promotions if he helps Damodar to temporarily get rid of Ishana. They do so, but Ishana also beats up the goons. When Ishana is trying to get away, Gutli (Damodar's henchman) stabs him from the back and they get into a nasty fight. In the fight, Gutli reveals that Ramisa has sent him to kill Ishana. The latter tells Gutli to go ahead and kill him as he knows that Ramisa only did this as she got scared the night he came over to her place. Gutli, frustrated, tells Ishana that she never loved him. She only loves her husband and used Ishana for satisfying her excessive sexual desires.

Badly wounded Ishana then rushes to Ramisa's house and strangles her, but doesn't kill her. He tells her to love her husband limitlessly and succumbs to his wounds, just as Damodar, Daddy and Lol enter the room.

== Cast ==
- Ahan Shetty as Ishana
- Tara Sutaria as Ramisa Nautiyal, Ishana's love interest and Damodar's daughter
- Saurabh Shukla as Daddy, Ishana's adopted father
- Kumud Mishra as MLA Damodar Nautiyal, Ramisa's father
- Rajesh Khera as Inspector Kanwar Negi
- Sumit Gulati as Lol, Ishana's best friend
- Mangala Kenkre as Dadi
- Saurav Chakrabarti (actor) as Guthli, a goon hired by Ramisa to kill Ishana
- Sohaila Kapur as Cafe Lady
- Raaj Vishwakarma as Aadi
- Manoj Kukshal as Lallan Moitre, Daddy's man.
- Hashim Haider as Kashinath "Kashi"
- Brij Bhushan Shukla as Bhandari
- Sharik Ahmed as Mahesh
- Geeta Ram Sharma as Jiyaram
- Bhanu Joshi as House Helper
- Rohit Sangwan as Producer

== Release ==
Tadap was initially scheduled to release on 24 September 2021 in theatres. However, it was later pushed to 3 December 2021. The movie was released in 2107 screens out which 1656 were in India and 451 in other countries.

=== Home media ===
The film premiered on Disney+ Hotstar on 28 January 2022.

== Reception ==
=== Critical response ===
On Rotten Tomatoes, the film holds a rating of 20% based on 10 reviews and an average rating of 3.3/10.

Rachana Dubey of Times of India gave the film a rating of 3/5 and wrote, 'Tadap unabashedly plays to the gallery with action, music, and well-shot visuals, it would have helped a great deal if its screenplay had created some more room for the actors to drive home a more memorable love story.' She praised the performances of Shetty, Sutaria and Shukla and further wrote, Ahan has an impressive screen presence and shows a spark in his debut outing; Saurabh Shukla pulls off his act with ample warmth and conviction and Tara Sutaria as Ramisa looks gorgeous in every frame. Monika Rawal Kukreja of Hindustan Times wrote, 'Tadap serves you raw action laced with heavyweight dialogues, old-school romance, passion, deceit, bloodshed and a few poetic lines to add a tinge of humour.' She praised Shetty's performance by writing, Ahan Shetty and his character arch leaves a long impression. As a young, angry action hero, he makes an intense and impressive debut but criticized Sutaria's character by stating it lacked depth and dimension. Shubhra Gupta of The Indian Express gave the film a rating of 1/5 and called its dialogues bombastic and its characters stereotyped. She criticized the plot of the film by calling it jaded and wrote, even if the debutant hero wanted to come off different, the jaded plot wouldn't have allowed it.

Saibal Chatterjee of NDTV gave the film a rating of 1.5/5 and called it a stale and forgettable film. He wrote, 'Tadap does not have a single original sleight; But that is the least of the film's drawbacks. Scratch the prettified surface and what you find is a misogynistic rant masquerading as a movie.' He praised Shetty by stating he exudes toughness, vulnerability and cherubic energy but criticized the writing of Sutaria's character by stating, Tara Sutaria, saddled with a poorly written role, is swamped out by a script that unfavourably disposed towards her. Nandini Ramnath of Scroll gave the film a rating of 1/5 and called it a twisted tale of misogyny. She wrote, 'Tadap valourises obsessive male love and has a nasty solution in store for the woman who doesn't respond in full measure.' Devesh Sharma of Filmfare gave the film a rating of 3/5 and praised the performance of Shetty and stated, he scores the most in action scenes [and] is at ease in front of the camera overall and makes a confident debut. Summing up, Sharma wrote, The leads definitely share a spark. Their histrionics is buoyed by good supporting performances by Kumud Mishra and Saurabh Shukla.

=== Box office ===
Tadap grossed ₹4.05 crore on its first day of release, ₹4.12 crore on second day and ₹5.35 crore on third day, taking total opening weekend domestic gross to ₹13.52 crore.

As of 30 December 2021, the film grossed ₹32.04 crore in India and ₹2.82 crore overseas, for a worldwide gross collection of ₹34.86 crore.

== Soundtrack ==
Tadap

Soundtrack album by Pritam
- Released: 3 December 2021
- Recorded: 2020
- Genre: Feature film soundtrack
- Length: 34:35
- Language: Hindi
- Label: T-Series

Pritam chronology
Ludo (2020)	Tadap (2021)	83 (2021)

Official audio
- Tadap - Full Album on YouTube

The film's music is composed by Pritam and the background score is composed by John Stewart Eduri, while the lyrics are written by Irshad Kamil.

=== Track list ===
Track Listing
No.	Title	Singer(s)	Length
1.	"Tumse Bhi Zyada"	Arijit Singh	5:19
2.	"Tere Siva Jag Mein"	Shilpa Rao, Darshan Raval, Shashwat Singh, Rap By: Charan	3:26
3.	"Tu Mera Hogaya Hai"	Jubin Nautiyal	5:09
4.	"Hoye Ishq Na"	B Praak, Dino James	4:39
5.	"Tere Siva Jag Mein" (Cafe Edit)	Darshan Raval	3:35
6.	"Ae Dilla Marjaaniyaan"	Neha Kakkar	4:14
7.	"Tu Mera Hogaya Hai" (Encore)	Javed Ali	5:10
8.	"Tere Siva Jag Mein" (Reprise)	Mohammed Irfan, Asees Kaur	3:03
Total length:			34:35
