= R. D. Rajasekhar =

Indian cinematographer

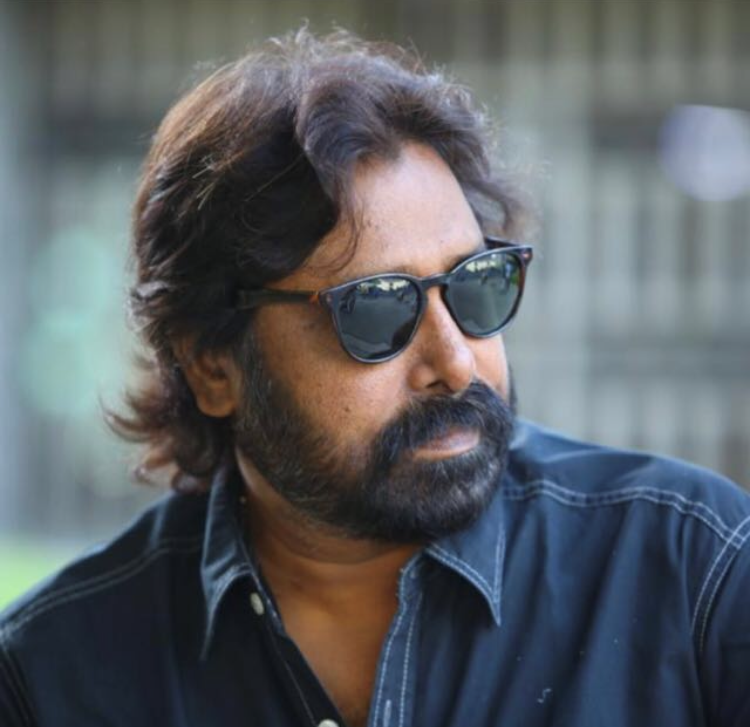
- Born: Mayiladuthurai, Mayiladuthurai district, Tamil Nadu, India
- Education: Madras Film Institute
- Occupation: Cinematographer
- Years active: 2001–present

R. D. Rajasekhar is an Indian cinematographer who predominantly works in films of Indian languages such as Tamil, Malayalam, Telugu, and Hindi. He is a recipient of the Tamil Nadu State Film Award for Best Cinematographer and Filmfare Award for Best Cinematographer – Tamil. He is the member of the Indian Society of Cinematographers (ISC).

== Film career ==
=== Early career ===
After graduating, Rajasekhar found work as an assistant cinematographer, working under Rajiv Menon for about nine years in many advertisement films.

=== Feature film ===
Rajasekhar's debut was in 2001, with the romantic drama Minnale. The camerawork of the advertisement films impressed his former colleague and frequent collaborator, Gautham Vasudev Menon. The film was well received and became extremely popular amongst the youth. Subsequently, Rajasekhar and Gautham vasudev menon teamed up again for the crime thriller, Kaakha Kaakha (2003). It was highly praised for its unique style of visuals and scenic views through the lens, which Rajasekhar achieved through a process known as Bleach bypass, where the silver is retained in the print, creating a washed-outlook that reflected in films. He followed it up with the remake of Kaakha Kaakha, Gharshana (2004), and Manmadhan (2004), which were received well amongst the audience.

In 2005, Rajasekhar began his collaboration with A. R. Murugadoss, which started with Ghajini. It earned him huge recognition and awards for the cinematography. Rajasekhar spent two months fine-tuning the look and de-saturating the overall images. It won him the Best Cinematographer award at the Tamil Nadu State Film Awards in 2005 and was nominated for the Best Cinematographer award in Filmfare Awards South, in 2006.

He made his Malayalam debut with 4 the People (2004). He reunited with A. R. Murugadoss for Akira (2016), the remake of Mouna Guru, having previously worked on Ghajini.

== Awards and recognitions ==
He had been nominated for Filmfare Awards South for Best Cinematographer in 2004, winning the Best Cinematographer on his first Filmfare Awards South in 2003 for Kaakha Kaakha. He also received award from prestigious Tamil Nadu State Film Award for Best Cinematographer for film Ghajini. He shot Imaikkaa Nodigal (2018), for which he won Best Cinematographer in SIIMA Award for Best Cinematographer - Tamil in the same year after the release.

== Filmography ==
Year	Title	Language	Notes
2001	Minnale	Tamil	Debut
2001	Citizen	Tamil	1 song
2002	Red	Tamil	
2003	Kaakha Kaakha	Tamil	Filmfare Award for Best Cinematographer – Tamil
2004	Gharshana	Telugu	Debut in Telugu cinema
2004	Manmadhan	Tamil	
2004	4 the people	Malayalam	Debut in Malayalam cinema
2005	Ghajini	Tamil	
2005	Thotti Jaya	Tamil	
2006	Happy	Telugu	
2006	Vallavan	Tamil	
2006	Sillunu Oru Kadhal	Tamil	Also actor
2008	Kaalai	Tamil	
2008	Bheemaa	Tamil	
2008	Sathyam	Tamil	
2010	Jaggubhai	Tamil	
2010	Varudu	Telugu	
2011	Vedi	Tamil	
2012	Karmayogi	Malayalam	
2012	Billa II	Tamil	
2012	Run Baby Run	Malayalam	
2013	Baadshah	Telugu	Additional cinematography
2014	Inga Enna Solluthu	Tamil	
2014	Arima Nambi	Tamil	
2014	Avatharam	Malayalam	
2015	Masss	Tamil	
2016	Akira	Hindi	Debut in Hindi cinema
2016	Iru Mugan	Tamil	
2016	Uyire Uyire	Tamil	
2017	Neruppu Da	Tamil	
2018	Imaikkaa Nodigal	Tamil	SIIMA Award for Best Cinematographer
2018	Jarugandi	Tamil	
2019	Hippi	Telugu	
2019	Thambi	Tamil	
2019	Thrissur Pooram	Malayalam	
2021	Netrikann	Tamil	
2021	Kasada Tabara	Tamil	Streaming release; Segment: Thappattam
2021	Enemy	Tamil	
2023	Tamilarasan	Tamil	
2023	Rudhran	Tamil	
2023	Makka Makka	Tamil	An independent music video with music by Harris Jayaraj, vocals by Sathyaprakash & Bamba Bakya, lyrics penned by Pa. Vijay
2023	Chandramukhi 2	Tamil	
2024	Bhaje Vaayu Vegam	Telugu	
2025	Rambo	Tamil	
2025	Mask	Tamil	
