= Bhaje Vaayu Vegam =

- Theatrical release poster
- Directed by: Prashanth Reddy
- Written by: Prashanth Reddy
- Produced by: UV Concepts
- Starring: Kartikeya; Iswarya Menon; Rahul Haridas; Tanikella Bharani; P. Ravi Shankar
- Cinematography: R. D. Rajasekhar
- Edited by: Satya Giduturi
- Music by: Songs: Radhan; Score: Kapil Kumar
- Distributed by: Dheeraj Mogilineni Entertainment; Dreamz Entertainment Limited (Britain)
- Release date: 31 May 2024
- Running time: 134 minutes
- Country: India
- Language: Telugu
- Box office: ₹8.05 crore

Bhaje Vaayu Vegam (transl. Worship the wind's speed) is a 2024 Indian Telugu-language action thriller film directed by Prashanth Reddy and produced by UV Concepts, a subsidiary of UV Creations. The film features Kartikeya Gummakonda and Rahul Haridas, alongside Iswarya Menon, Tanikella Bharani, P. Ravi Shankar and Sharath Lohithaswa. The soundtrack and musical score were composed by Radhan and Kapil Kumar, while cinematography and editing were handled by R. D. Rajasekhar and Satya Giduturi, respectively.

Bhaje Vaayu Vegam was released on 31 May 2024 and received positive reviews from critics and emerged as a moderate commercial success grossing over ₹8.05 crore at the box office.

== Plot ==
Venkat loses his parents at a very young age and is adopted by a farmer Bharani who raises him along with his son Raju. Bharani sends Venkat & Raju to Hyderabad to pursue their passion. In a twist of fate, the brothers end up in odd professions, bettor and valet driver. Keeping it a secret from their father they get to know about his life-threatening disease. In a rush to get him medicated, the brothers drift into a political crime rollercoaster. How Venkat eventually emerges from the situation and saves the lives of his brother and father forms the crux of the story.

== Cast ==
- Kartikeya Gummakonda as Burugu Venkata Ramana "Venkat"
- Rahul Haridas as Goppula Raju, Venkat's elder brother
- P. Ravi Shankar as David
- Sharath Lohithaswa as Mayor George, David's elder brother
- Iswarya Menon as Indu
- Tanikella Bharani as Goppula Lakshmaiah

== Production ==
The film was publicly announced with a poster on 8 April 2024, under the tentative title #Kartikeya8, due to it being the eighth film starring Kartikeya in a lead role. First look of the film was launched by Mahesh Babu on 12 April 2024. The teaser was unveiled by Chiranjeevi on 20 May 2024, while the film's trailer was unveiled to the public on 25 May 2024.

== Soundtrack ==
Bhaje Vaayu Vegam

Film score by Radhan
- Released: 2024
- Studio: Mujeep Studio, Chennai; 20dB Sound Studios, Chennai
- Genre: Feature film soundtrack
- Length: 7:48
- Language: Telugu
- Label: Aditya Music

Radhan chronology
Siddharth Roy (2024)	Bhaje Vaayu Vegam (2024)

The soundtrack was composed by Radhan, while Kapil Kumar dealt with the background score. The first single, "Set Ayyindhe" was released on 9 May 2024, and talks about a young man's content and fulfillment because he believes that he has found his soulmate.

M9 stated, "However, Radhan’s songs are weak here. Nothing sticks. Kapil Kumar J’s background score is impactful and elevates the proceedings in the second half."

Track List
No.	Title	Lyrics	Singer(s)	Length
1.	"Set Ayyindhe"	Ramajogayya Sastry	Ranjith Govind	3:51
2.	"Welcome to My Zindagi"	Ramajogayya Sastry	Karthik	3:57

== Release ==
=== Theatrical ===
The film released on 31 May 2024.

=== Home media ===
The digital streaming rights were acquired by Netflix and was premiered on 28 June 2024.

== Reception ==
The Times of India gave the film three out of five stars. The Hindu said the movie is a mishmash of ideas and themes combined with poor writing.
