= Siddharth Roy =

2024 film by V. Yeshasvi

- Theatrical release poster
- Directed by: V. Yeshasvi
- Written by: V. Yeshasvi
- Produced by: Jaya Adapaka
- Starring: Deepak Saroj; Tanvi Negi; Gaurav Mahaur
- Cinematography: Shyam K. Naidu
- Edited by: Prawin Pudi
- Music by: Radhan
- Production companies: Shree Radha Damodar Studios; Vihaan And Vihin Creations
- Release date: 23 February 2024
- Country: India
- Language: Telugu

Siddharth Roy is a 2024 Indian Telugu-language romantic drama film written and directed by V. Yeshasvi. The film features Deepak Saroj and Tanvi Negi in lead roles.

The film was released in theatres on 23 February 2024.

== Plot ==
The story centres around the titular character, Siddharth Roy (played by Deepak Saroj), a young man who approaches life with a strictly logical and emotionless perspective. He believes that life is governed by basic needs like food, sleep, and intimacy, and he maintains an emotionally detached demeanor. However, his worldview is challenged when he meets Indumathi (played by Tanvi Negi), a woman who believes in emotions and values that contradict his logical mindset.

As Siddharth falls in love with Indumathi, he grapples with the complexities of love and emotions, which clash with his previously held beliefs. The story unfolds as Siddharth navigates this new emotional landscape, leading to an internal conflict and a transformation in his character. The plot also includes a mystery surrounding Indumathi's sudden departure from his life, leaving Siddharth to question whether she will return or if he must change for her.

== Cast ==
- Deepak Saroj as Siddharth Roy "Siddhu"
- Tanvi Negi as E. Indhumathi "Indu"
- Anand as Siddharth Roy's father
- Matthew Varghese as ACP Prudhvi
- Kalyani Natarajan as Siddharth Roy's mother
- Nandini Yallareddy
- Keerthana
- Sivakumar
- Yandamuri Veerendranath
- C. V. L. Narasimha Rao as Dr. Ramana Gopisetti
- Bhushan Kalyan
- Srinivas Vajpayee
- Jayasri Rachakonda as Indhumathi's mother

== Music ==
Siddharth Roy

Soundtrack album by Radhan
- Released: 16 February 2024
- Recorded: 2023–2024
- Genre: Feature film soundtrack
- Length: 24:25
- Language: Telugu
- Label: Saregama
- Producer: Radhan

Radhan chronology
Miss Shetty Mr Polishetty (2023)	Siddharth Roy (2024)	Bhaje Vaayu Vegam (2024)

The film's soundtrack album and background score were composed by Radhan.

All music is composed by Radhan.

Track list
No.	Title	Lyrics	Singer(s)	Length
1.	"Cheliya Chalu"	V. Yeshasvi	Sanjith Hegde	4:41
2.	"Kathalo Kathe"	Purnachary	Saindhavi	2:53
3.	"Nuvvu Nammina Sidhanatham"	Balaji	Sarath Santosh	3:42
4.	"Sadha Sadha"	Ramajogayya Sastry	Anweshaa	4:34
5.	"Life Is This Beautiful"	V. Yeshasvi	Karthik, Srinisha Jayaseelan	4:50
6.	"Nuvvevaro Mari"	Purnachary	Benny Dayal	2:58

== Release and reception ==
Siddharth Roy was released on 23 February 2024. Post-theatrical digital streaming rights were acquired by Aha and was premiered on 3 May 2024.

Paul Nicodemus The Times of India gave a rating of two out of five stars and opined that "Despite its shortcomings, Siddharth Roy presents a dynamic and bold narrative that might find favour with a young audience seeking a contemporary love story infused with action and a slice-of-life elements". Bhavana Sarvepalli of Times Now too gave the same rating and praised the performance of Deepak Saroj and the work of cinematographer Naidu and the score of the film, while criticizing about the narration and the casting.
