= Chaavu Kaburu Challaga =

2021 film directed by Peggalapati Koushik

- Official release poster
- Directed by: Pegallapati Koushik
- Written by: Pegallapati Koushik
- Produced by: Bunny Vasu; Allu Aravind (Presenter)
- Starring: Kartikeya; Lavanya Tripathi
- Cinematography: Karm Chawla
- Edited by: G. Satya
- Music by: Jakes Bejoy
- Production company: GA2 Pictures
- Release date: 19 March 2021
- Running time: 137 minutes
- Country: India
- Language: Telugu
- Box office: ₹5.40 crore

Chaavu Kaburu Challaga (transl. Notifying death news coldly) is a 2021 Indian Telugu-language romantic comedy-drama film written and directed by Peggalapati Koushik and produced by Bunny Vasu and Allu Aravind under GA2 Pictures. The film stars Kartikeya and Lavanya Tripathi with Murali Sharma, Aamani, Srikanth Iyyengar, and Rajitha play supporting roles. The film was released on 19 March 2021 and was a commercial failure at the box office.

== Plot ==
Basthi Balaraju is a hearse driver in Vizag. He lives with his mother, Gangamma, and his bedridden father. One day, he is called to take Peter's body to the cemetery. When he goes to Peter's house, he sees Mallika, and later on, he realizes that Peter is Mallika's husband. However, Balaraju does not care and decides to love Mallika. He tries to persuade Mallika to move on with her life and choose him as her new husband. This causes trouble with Mallika's father-in-law, Sekhar Samuel.

In the process, Balaraju realizes that his mother is having an affair with Mohan, who has loved her for a long time, but Gangamma never accepted his love, and they decided to stay as friends. After an altercation with Mohan, Balaraju understands his mother's feelings by speaking to her about this affair. He then learns that his mother wants a person to share her feelings, as her husband has been bedridden since Balaraju's birth. Balaraju changes as he never thought about her feelings. He then decides to get Gangamma and Mohan married, and at the same time, Mallika reciprocates his feelings.

Everything is going smoothly until Mallika receives a marriage proposal, and must tell Balaraju that she has to marry another man. She then finds Balaraju at the hospital where Gangamma has been admitted after being in an accident. Due to high blood loss, Gangamma dies, and Balaraju slips into depression. Mohan then steps up, taking care of both Balaraju and his father, and Balaraju works at his mother's corn stand on the beach. Later, before Mallika's marriage, Balaraju decides to meet with Sekhar and tries to tell him about how much he loves Mallika. During the wedding, Sekhar realizes and stops the marriage. Sekhar then finds Balaraju and marries him to Mallika.

== Cast ==
- Kartikeya as Basthi Balaraju
- Lavanya Tripathi as Mallika (Voice dubbed by Chinmayi)
- Aamani as Gangamma, Balaraju's mother
- Murali Sharma as Sekhar Samuel
- Srikanth Iyyengar as Mohan, Gangamma's boyfriend
- Rajitha as Mallika's mother-in-law
- Tanikella Bharani as Balaraju's uncle (special appearance)
- Bhadram as Balaraju's friend
- Achanta Mahesh
- Prabhu

== Production ==
The film was announced in December 2019. The principal photography of the film was started in late 2019. Later that year due to COVID-19 pandemic, the film was delayed. Filming was resumed in October 2020. Music is composed by Malayalam film composer Jakes Bejoy who previously composed for Taxiwaala (2018) in Telugu.

== Soundtrack ==
Chaavu Kaburu Challaga

Soundtrack album by Jakes Bejoy
- Released: 2021
- Recorded: 2020–2021
- Genre: Feature film soundtrack
- Length: 29:48
- Language: Telugu
- Label: Aditya Music
- Producer: Jakes Bejoy

Jakes Bejoy chronology
Operation Java (2021)	Chaavu Kaburu Challaga (2021)	Kuruthi (2021)

The soundtrack and background score were composed by Jakes Bejoy. The audio rights were acquired by Aditya Music.

Chaavu Kaburu Challaga track listing
No.	Title	Lyrics	Singer(s)	Length
1.	"My Name Iju Raju"	Karunakar Adigarla	L. V. Revanth	4:43
2.	"Kadhile Kaalannadiga"	Koushik Pegallapati, Sanare	Gowtham Bharadwaj, Shashaa Tirupati	4:58
3.	"Paina Pataaram"	Sanare	Mangli, Ram, Saketh	4:42
4.	"Fix Ayipo"	Koushik Pegallapati, Sanare	Rahul Sipligunj, Aditya Tadepalli	3:56
5.	"Ayyayyayyo"	Karunakar Adigarla	Aditya Tadepalli	3:57
6.	"Yendaro Mosina"	Sanare	Deepika V	4:14
7.	"Orori Devudo"	Karunakar Adigarla	Anirudh Suswaram	3:18
Total length:				29:48

== Release ==
Chaavu Kaburu Challaga was released theatrically on 19 March 2021. The film began streaming on Aha from 23 April 2021.

== Reception ==
Y. Sunitha Chowdhary of The Hindu wrote that despite a promising storyline, the film could not make a mark. A reviewer from The Hans India felt that director took up a challenging story but faltered in execution. They appreciated the performance of Karthikeya and opined that Tripathi got a novel character. The New Indian Express critic Gabbeta Ranjith Kumar wrote his review on a positive note, praising the storyline and performances.

The Times of India journalist Neesthi Nyayapati opined that the film's noble thought did not translate well, and wrote: "Chaavu Kaburu Challaga dares to go where few films would – show that a woman’s life does not have to end, begin and revolve around her family. If only the film was surefooted enough to deliver that message."
