= Anagha =

Indian actress

- Born: Anagha Maruthora; 1992; Kuttiady, Kerala, India
- Occupation: Actress
- Years active: 2017–present

Anagha Maruthora (born 1992) is an Indian model and actress who works in Malayalam and Tamil films. She made her acting debut with the Malayalam movie Rakshadhikari Baiju Oppu (2017). She won SIIMA Best Debutant Tamil Actress award for her performance in Natpe Thunai (2019).

She has acted in successful films such as Rakshadhikari Baiju Oppu (2017), Parava (2017), Natpe Thunai (2019), Guna 369 (2019), Bheeshma Parvam (2022) and Grrr (2024).

== Early life ==
Anagha was born in Kozhikode, Kerala. Anagha's father Kuttikrishnan and mother Leela are retired teachers. She completed her primary schooling at Sree Gokulam Public School, Calicut. Anagha did her B.Tech. at College of Engineering Chengannur at Chengannur and Completed M.Tech. at (NIELIT) National Institute of Electronics and Information Technology, Calicut.

== Filmography ==
=== Films ===
Key
†	Denotes films that have not yet been released

Year	Title	Role	Language	Notes	Ref.
2017	Rakshadhikari Baiju Oppu	Rosy	Malayalam	Debut film	
2017	Parava	Shane's love interest	Malayalam		
2018	Rosapoo	Actress	Malayalam		
2019	Natpe Thunai	Deepa	Tamil	Tamil debut	
2019	Guna 369	Geetha	Telugu	Telugu debut	
2021	Dikkiloona	Priya	Tamil		
2021	Meendum	Mithra	Tamil		
2022	Bheeshma Parvam	Rachel	Malayalam		
2022	Buffoon	Ilayaal	Tamil		
2024	Grrr	Rachana	Malayalam		
2024	Adios Amigo	Hema	Malayalam		
2024	Kadaisi Ulaga Por	Keerthana	Tamil		
2026	Mr. X	Dr. Keerthana	Tamil		

=== Web series ===
Year	Title	Role	Language	Notes
2026	Vadhandhi (Season 2)	Rathika Nair	Tamil	
2026	Eyes		SonyLIV	

=== Music videos ===
Year	Album	Language	Co Star	Composer	Ref.
2021	Magizhini	Tamil	Gouri G Kishan	Govind Vasantha	
2021	Allipoola Vennela	Telugu	Mekha Rajan, Angelina	A. R. Rahman	

== Awards and nominations ==
Year	Film	Award	Category	Result	Ref.
2019	Natpe Thunai	South Indian International Movie Award	Best Female Debut - Tamil	Won	
2019	Guna 369	South Indian International Movie Award	Best Female Debut - Telugu	Nominated	
