= Ramya Behara =

Indian musical artist

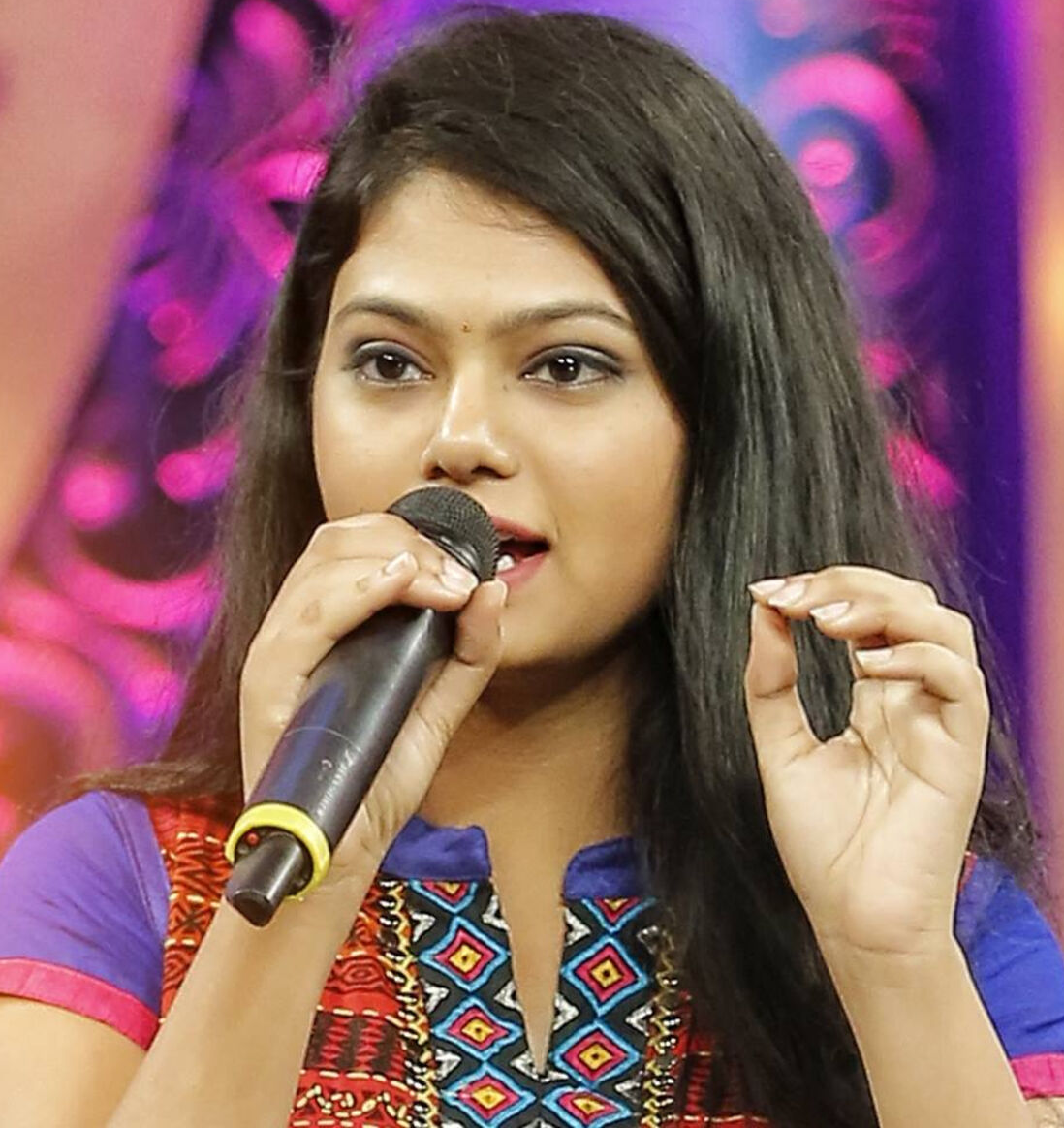

Background information
- Born: Narasaraopet, Andhra Pradesh, India
- Occupation: Playback Singer
- Years active: 2009–present
- Spouse: Anurag Kulkarni (m. 2024)

Ramya Behara is an Indian playback singer who works predominantly in Telugu films. She has sung over 180 songs in Telugu, Kannada, Tamil, Malayalam and Hindi films. "Dhivara" from the Telugu film Baahubali: The Beginning (2015) was her breakthrough.

== Early life and career ==
Behara was born in Narasaraopet, Guntur district, Andhra Pradesh, India and was raised in Hyderabad. She stated that her passion for singing began when she was in seventh grade. She went to Little Music Academy and was trained under Ramachary. She was introduced to films by M. M. Keeravani. Behara's first song was recorded for a Telugu film Vengamamba.

== Discography ==
=== Telugu songs ===
List of songs recorded in Telugu
Year	Work	Song(s)	Composer	Ref.
2009	Vengamamba	"Sapthagirisuni"	M. M. Keeravani	
2011	Rajanna	"Raa Ree Ro Rela"	M. M. Keeravani	
2011	Rajanna	"Chittiguvva"	M. M. Keeravani	
2012	Chanakyudu	"Andhala Mahila"	Rahul Sipligunj and Vengi	
2012	Chanakyudu	"Aamanila"	Rahul Sipligunj and Vengi	
2013	Prema Katha Chitram	"Kothagunna Haayi Nuvva"	J. B.	
2013	Vegam	"Ninnu Choodalani"	Pramod Kumar	
2013	Kevvu Keka	"Modhal Modhal"	Bheems Ceciroleo and Chinni Charan	
2014	Pelladandi Preminchaka Matrame	"Chinukula Jadi"		
2014	What Happen 6 To 6	"Kshanamu Kshanamu"		
2014	Kotha Janta	"Osi Prema Rakshas"	J. B.	
2014	Maaya	"Enduko"	Shekar Chandra	
2014	Emo Gurram Egaravachu	"Maid in India"	M. M. Keeravani	
2014	Emo Gurram Egaravachu	"Bull Boy"	M. M. Keeravani	
2014	Emo Gurram Egaravachu	"Yennisarlaina"	M. M. Keeravani	
2014	Geethanjali	"Coffee Song"	Praveen Lakkaraju	
2014	Green Signal	"Janeja"	J. B.	
2014	Chinnadana Nee Kosam	"Mundhugane"	Anup Rubens	
2014	Oka Laila Kosam	"Oo Cheli Nuvve Na Cheli" "Mix Mashup"	Anup Rubens	
2014	Anandini	"Andari Raata Raasedi"	Sindoori	
2014	Loukyam	"Soodu Soodu"	Anup Rubens	
2014	Chakkiligintha	"Mayo Mayo"	Mickey J. Meyer	
2014	Chakkiligintha	"O Kshanama"	Mickey J. Meyer	
2014	Dikkulu Choodaku Ramayya	"Theli Pothunna"	M. M. Keeravani	
2015	Temper	"Choolenge Aasma"	Anup Rubens	
2015	Sankarabharanam	"Thoorupey"	Praveen Lakkaraju	
2015	Baahubali: The Beginning	"Dhivara"	M. M. Keeravani	
2015	Cinema Choopistha Mava	"Tholi Tholi"	Shekar Chandra	
2015	Sathi Thimmamamba	"Andhamaina Prakruthi"	Bandaru Danaiah	
2015	Sathi Thimmamamba	"Hey Chitrapatama"	Bandaru Danaiah	
2015	Sathi Thimmamamba	"Talapula Kotalo"	Bandaru Danaiah	
2015	Bruce Lee: The Fighter	"Kung Fu Kumaari"	S. Thaman	
2015	Subramanyam for Sale	"Aakasam Thassadiyya"	Mickey J. Meyer	
2015	Subramanyam for Sale	"Guvva Gorinka Remix"	Mickey J. Meyer	
2015	Ayyo Rama	"Chinni Chinni"	Dhinakar	
2015	Yavvanam Oka Fantasy	"Casinolaga"	Jeevan Thomas	
2015	Daana Veera Soora Karna	"Raa Raa Madhava Muralilola"	Kousalya	
2015	Size Zero	"Size Zero"	M. M. Keeravani	
2015	Size Zero	"Innava Innava"	M. M. Keeravani	
2016	Sathamanam Bhavati	"Mellaga Tellarindoi"	Mickey J. Meyer	
2016	Padesave	"Aasa Aasa"	Anup Rubens	
2016	Jakkanna	"Andham Tannullona"	Dinesh	
2016	A Aa	"Rang De"	Mickey J. Meyer	
2016	Chal Chal Gurram	"Arere Are"	Vengi	
2016	Krishnashtami	"Bava Bava Panneeru"	Dinesh	
2016	Krishnashtami	"Nuvve Nenu Ante"	Dinesh	
2016	Krishnashtami	"Love is True"	Dinesh	
2016	Meelo Evaru Koteeswarudu	"Antha Yedo Kalalane Undi"	D.J.Vasanth	
2016	Brahmotsavam	"Naayudorinti Kaada"	Mickey J. Meyer	
2016	Ekkadiki Pothavu Chinnavada	"Neetho Unte Chalu"	Shekar Chandra	
2016	Okka Ammayi Thappa	"Yegirenay Yegirenay"	Mickey J. Meyer	
2016	Okka Ammayi Thappa	"Kotha Kadhalay"	Mickey J. Meyer	
2016	Chuttalabbai	"Chuttalabbayi"	S. Thaman	
2016	Speedunnodu	"Rekkalatho Chukkalakegira"	D.J.Vasanth	
2016	Rojulu Marayi	"Raa Rammantunna ra"	J.B.	
2016	Jyo Achyutananda	"Aakupachani Chandamamala"	Kalyani Malik	
2016	Eedu Gold Ehe	"Kopaalenduku Babai"	Mahathi Swara Sagar	
2016	Kundanapu Bomma	"Neetho Aithe"	M. M. Keeravani	
2017	LIE	"Bombhaat"	Mani Sharma	
2017	LIE	"Freedom"	Mani Sharma	
2017	Balakrishnudu	"Ardharathri Sureedu"	Mani Sharma	
2017	Balakrishnudu	"Tharira Tharira"	Mani Sharma	
2017	Gunturodu	"Padhe Padhe"	D.J.Vasanth	
2017	Iddari Madhya 18	"Yeppudo Naa Manasantha"	Ghantadi Krishna	
2017	Premanjali	"Aa Ninna Nenu"	P Govardhan	
2017	Premanjali	"Nevani Nevani"	P Govardhan	
2017	Goutham Nanda	"Basthi Dorasani"	S. Thaman	
2017	Goutham Nanda	"Zindagi Na Milega Dobara"	S. Thaman	
2017	Sarovaram	"Ala Ala Nuvvu"	Sunil Kashyap	
2017	Jayadev	"Na Face Chusi Book Ayyaka"	Mani Sharma	
2017	Abbo Naa Pellanta	"Cheliya Cheliya"	Siva Prasad	
2017	Vaisakam	"Bhanumathi Bhanumathi"	D. J. Vasanth	
2017	Vaisakam	"Daggaraga Raavoddilaga"	D. J. Vasanth	
2017	Vaisakam	"Come on Country Chilaka"	D. J. Vasanth	
2017	Ami Thumi	"Takadhimi"	Mani Sharma	
2017	Om Namo Venkatesaya	"Veyi Namaala Vada"	M. M. Keeravani	
2017	Mister	"Kanulake Theliyani"	Mickey J. Meyer	
2017	Mister	"Sayyori Sayyori"	Mickey J. Meyer	
2017	Pratikshanam	"Jarinadi Jabili"	Raghu ram	
2017	Samantakamani	"Padha Padha Padha"	Mani Sharma	
2017	Shivalinga	"Nallanivade"	S. Thaman	
2017	Nene Raju Nene Mantri	"Radhamma Radhamma"	Anup Rubens	
2017	Patel S. I. R.	"Nimmi Nimmi"	D.J.Vasanth	
2017	Patel S. I. R.	"Patel Patel SIR"	D.J.Vasanth	
2018	Baahubali 2: The Conclusion	"Lullaby of Death"	M. M. Keeravani	
2018	Bhaagamathie	"Theme song"	S. Thaman	
2018	Naa Peru Surya	"Maya"	Vishal–Shekhar	
2018	Raju Gadu	"Rendu Kallaninda"	Gopi Sundar	
2018	Premiche Panilo Unna	"Amma Amma"	Dronavajjala Raghuram	
2018	Mahanati	"Aagipo Baalyama"	Mickey J. Meyer	
2018	Mahanati	"Gelupuleni Samaram"	Mickey J. Meyer	
2018	Amar Akbar Anthony	"Don Bosco"	S. Thaman	
2018	Amar Akbar Anthony	"Khullam Khulla Chilla"	S. Thaman	
2018	Devadas	"Hey Babu"	Mani Sharma	
2018	Devadas	"Emo Emo"	Mani Sharma	
2018	Sainyam	"Aashale Alavale"	Dhanunjay	
2018	Juvva	"Anukoledhe"	M. M. Keeravani	
2018	Best Actors	"Acapella"	J. B.	
2018	Best Actors	"Neelakasam"	J. B.	
2018	MLA	"Most Wanted Abbayi"	Mani Sharma	
2018	Jadoogadu	"ABC ABC"	Mahati Swara Sagar	
2018	Jadoogadu	"Jaadugadu"	Mahati Swara Sagar	
2018	Howrah Bridge	"Tholisariga"	Shekar Chandra	
2018	Nela Ticket	"Love You Love You"	Shakthikanth Karthick	
2018	Shailaja Reddy Alludu	"Gold Rangu Pilla"	Gopi Sundar	
2018	Nartanasala	"Ela Netho"	Mahati Swara Sagar	
2018	Jai Simha	"Priyam Jagame Anandham"	Chirrantan Bhatt	
2018	Parichayam	"Raava Ila Malli Raava"	Shekar Chandra	
2018	Juvva	"Anukoledhe"	M. M. Keeravani	
2018	Ye Mantram Vesave	"Go Lady Gaga"	Abdus Samad	
2018	Gayatri	"Sarasamaha"	S. Thaman	
2018	NTR: Kathanayakudu	"Katha Naayaka (Female)"	M. M. Keeravani	
2018	Brand Babu	"Brand Babu Okkadu"	Jeevan Babu	
2018	Officer	"Navve Navvu"	Ravi Shankar	
2019	Ruler	"Sankranthi"	Chirrantan Bhatt	
2019	Raja Vaaru Rani Gaaru	"Tirigi Tirigi"	Jay Krish	
2019	Prema Katha Chitram 2	"Aakashamantha"	Jeevan Babu	
2019	Prema Katha Chitram 2	"Merupula Merisina"	Jeevan Babu	
2019	Parari	"Band Baaja"	Mahith Narayan	
2019	iSmart Shankar	"Undipo"		
2019	iSmart Shankar	"Zindabad Zindabad"		
2019	Frozen II	"Nee Maya Val Lo"		
2019	Frozen II	"Konne Shaswatham"		
2019	Frozen II	"Ra Ittu"		
2019	Venky Mama	"Cocacola Pepsi"	S. Thaman	
2019	Mallesham	"Naaku Nuvvani"	Mark K Robin	
2019	Mallesham	"Kotha Kothaga"	Mark K Robin	
2019	Mallesham	"Entha Maaya"	Mark K Robin	
2019	90ML	"Anukoledhe Anukoledhe"	Anup Rubens	
2019	Mr. Majnu	"Chiru Chiru Navvula"	S. Thaman	
2019	Dubsmash	"Ne Mounam"	Vamssih B	
2019	Gods of Dharmapuri	"Raakasi Loya"	Shaktikanth Karthick	
2019	Guna 369	"Dheveri"	Chaitan Bharadwaj	
2019	Nuvvu Thopu Raa	"Raro Naa Suri"	Suresh Bobbili P. A. Deepak	
2019	Pailwaan	"Prema Kaalam"	Arjun Janya	
2020	World Famous Lover	"My Love"	Gopi Sundar	
2020	Miss India	"Naa Chinni Lokkammea"	S. Thaman	
2020	Colour Photo	"Ekaantham"	Kaala Bhairava	
2020	Middle Class Melodies	"Keelugurram"	Sweekar Agasthi	
2020	Love Life & Pakodi	"Ee Payanam"	Anup Rubens	
2020	Oollala Oollala	"Ee vela Sandya Ragam"	Joy Royarala	
2020	Palasa 1978	"Kalavathi Kalavathi"	Raghu Kunche	
2021	Red	"Nuvve Nuvve"	Mani Sharma	
2021	Krack	"Korameesam Polisoda"	S. Thaman	
2021	Yuvarathnaa	"Oorikokka Raaja"	S. Thaman	
2021	Ichata Vahanamulu Niluparadu	"Hey Manasendukila"	Praveen Lakkaraju	
2021	Shaadi Mubarak	"Krishna Nee Begane"	Sunil Kashyap	
2021	Seetimaarr	"Kabaddi Anthem"	Mani Sharma	
2021	Devarakondalo Vijaya Premakatha	"Nuvvo Sagam"	Sadachandra	
2021	Pelli SandaD	"Pelli SandaD"	M. M. Keeravani	
2021	Pelli SandaD	"Gandharva Lokala"	M. M. Keeravani	
2021	Anubhavinchu Raja	"Neevalle Raa"	Gopi Sundar	
2021	Madhi	"Kavvinche Kalavu"	P.V.R. Raja	
2021	Roberrt	"Ninodhalaka Neenu"	Arjun Janya	
2021	Missing	"Hola Hola"	Mani Sharma	
2021	Missing	"Khullam Khulla"	Mani Sharma	Backing vocals
2021	Missing	"Solo Life (Female)"	Mani Sharma	Backing vocals
2021	Missing	"Nimishama"	Mani Sharma	Backing vocals
2022	Bhala Thandanana	"Raasaanilaa"	Mani Sharma	
2022	Acharya	"Neelambari"	Mani Sharma	
2022	Sita Ramam	"Oh Sita Hey Rama"	Vishal Chandrasekhar	
2022	Pakka Commercial	"Andala Raasi"	Jakes Bejoy	
2022	Naa Ventapaduthunna Chinnadevadamma..?	"Pudamini Thadipe"	K. Sandeep Kumar	
2022	Liger	"Akdi Pakdi"	Lijo George, DJ Chetas, Sunil Kashyap	
2022	Prince	"Bimbiliki Pilapi"	S. Thaman	
2022	The Ghost	"Vegam"	Bharatt-Saurabh	
2022	HIT: The Second Case	"Urike Urike"	John Stewart Eduri	
2022	Lucky Lakshman	"Premo Yemo"	Anup Rubens	
2022	Dhamaka	"What's Happening"	Bheems Ceciroleo	
2023	Veera Simha Reddy	"Mass Mogudu"	Thaman S	
2023	Shaakuntalam	"Mallika Mallika"	Mani Sharma	
2023	Popcorn	"Madhi Vihangamayye"	Shravan Bharadwaj	
2023	Chandramukhi 2	"Ra Ra"	M. M. Keeravani	Telugu dubbed version
2023	Skanda	"Cult Mama"	Thaman S	
2023	Jawan	"Eeram Theme"	Anirudh Ravichander	Telugu dubbed version
2024	Geethanjali Malli Vachindi	"Nuvvee Raavaa Raavaa"	Praveen Lakkaraju	
2024	Purushothamudu	"Manasey Vellipothey"	Gopi Sundar	
2024	Amaran	"Hey Rangule"	G. V. Prakash Kumar	Telugu dubbed version
2025	14 Days Girlfriend Intlo	"Manase"	Mark K. Robin	
2025	23 Iravai Moodu	"Bangaram Akkarleni"	Mark K. Robin	
2025	Constable	"Megham Kurisindi"	Subhash Anand	
2025	Kothapallilo Okappudu	"Yelo Yennello"	Mani Sharma	
2025	Hari Hara Veera Mallu: Part 1	"Kollagottinadhiro"	M. M. Keeravani	
2025	Premistunnaa	"Aha Adhemito"	Siddharth Salur	
2025	They Call Him OG	"Hungry Cheetah"	S. Thaman	
2025	Champion	"I Am A Champion"	Mickey J. Meyer	
2026	Aakasamlo Oka Tara	"Chitti Chitti Cheema"	G. V. Prakash Kumar	
2026	Emo Emo Idi	"Emo Emo Idi Title Song"	Hesham Abdul Wahab	

=== Kannada songs ===
List of songs recorded in Kannada
Year	Work	Song(s)	Composer
2014	Shivam	"Roma Roma Romancesu"	Mani Sharma
2015	Buguri	"Ninnamanemunde"	Mickey J. Meyer
2015	Buguri	"Ladies and Gentlemen"	Mickey J. Meyer
2016	Madhura Swapna	"Nannalli Ninnade"	Ravi Kalyan
2018	Kanaka	"Yara Badukinalli"	Naveen Sajju
2018	Kumari 21F	"Ba Kollona"	Mahati Swara Sagar
2019	Girgitle	"Neena Adu Neena"	Leo Peters
2019	Kaarmoda Saridu	"Nee Bande Baalalli"	Satish Babu
2021	Yuvarathnaa	"Oorigobba Raaja"	S. Thaman
2023	Shaakuntalam	"Mallika Mallika"	Mani Sharma

=== Tamil songs ===
List of songs recorded in Tamil
Year	Work	Song(s)	Composer
2015	Baahubali: The Beginning	"Deerane"	M. M. Keeravani
2017	Shivalinga	"Sirika Vechu"	S. Thaman
2018	Bhaagamathie	"Theme song"	S. Thaman
2021	Yuvarathnaa	"Ooril Oru Raaja"	S. Thaman
2022	Prince	"Bimbiliki Pilapi"	S. Thaman
2023	Shaakuntalam	"Malligaa Malligaa"	Mani Sharma
2024	Devara: Part 1	"Daavudi"	Anirudh Ravichander
2026	Aakasamlo Oka Tara	"Mittai Mazhai"	G. V. Prakash Kumar

=== Hindi songs ===
List of songs recorded in Hindi
Year	Work	Song(s)	Composer
2015	Baby	"Main Tujhse Pyaar Nahin Karti"	M. M. Keeravani
2015	Baahubali: The Beginning	"Jiyore Baahubali"	M. M. Keeravani
2021	Yuvarathnaa	"Hodi Pe Aaja Raja"	S. Thaman
2023	Shaakuntalam	"Mallika Mallika"	Mani Sharma
2025	They Call Him OG - (((D)))	"Hungry Cheetah"	S. Thaman

=== Malayalam songs ===
List of songs recorded in Malayalam
Year	Work	Song(s)	Composer
2018	Bhaagamathie	"Theme song"	S. Thaman
2023	Shaakuntalam	"Mallike Mallike"	Mani Sharma
2024	Devara: Part 1	"Daavudi"	Anirudh Ravichander

=== Odiya songs ===
Odia discography
Year	Work	Song(s)	Composer
2018	Hey Prabhu Dekha De	"Jibanare Jitibaku"	Varikuppala Yadagiri

== Personal life ==
Ramya married her co-artist Anurag Kulkarni in November 2024.

== Awards and nominations ==
Year	Award	Category	Work	Result	Ref.
2016	CineMAA Awards	Best Singer – Female	"Dhivara" from Baahubali: The Beginning	Won	
2016	South Indian International Movie Awards	Best Female Playback Singer – Telugu	"Dhivara" from Baahubali: The Beginning	Nominated	
2017	Filmfare Awards South	Best Female Playback Singer – Telugu	"Naidorintikada" from Brahmotsavam	Nominated	
2017	South Indian International Movie Awards	Best Female Playback Singer – Telugu	"Rang De" from A Aa	Won	
2019	Filmfare Awards South	Best Female Playback Singer – Telugu	"Gelupu Leni Samaram" from Mahanati	Nominated	
2021	South Indian International Movie Awards	Best Female Playback Singer – Telugu	"Ekaantham" from Colour Photo	Nominated	
2022	South Indian International Movie Awards	Best Female Playback Singer – Kannada	"Oorigobba Raaja" from Yuvarathnaa	Nominated	
2022	Filmfare Awards South	Best Female Playback Singer – Telugu	"Korameesam Polisoda" from Krack	Nominated	
