= 99TV =

Indian Telugu news channel

- Country: India
- Broadcast area: India
- Headquarters: Hyderabad, India

Programming
- Language: Telugu
- Picture format: 576i

Ownership
- Owner: BPL Media Limited
- Key people: Gurdeep S Jujhar (Chairman)

History
- Launched: 20 July 2014

99TV is an Indian free-to-air television channel that provides 24-hour news coverage in Telugu language. 99TV was founded in 2014 and is currently owned by New Waves Media headed by Thota Chandrasekhar, a former IAS officer., later this channel was only promoted by Gurdeep Jujhar

== History ==
99TV was launched in 2014 as a 24-hour Telugu news channel by the Communist Party of India (CPI). Under CPI, the channel was not profitable and the party wanted to sell off the channel.

On 11 July 2018, 99TV was taken over by New Waves Digital media promoted by Thota Chandrasekhar. Chandrasekhar is a former IAS officer, and owns a real estate company called Aditya Constructions.

As per TRAI's Cable TV Rules which came into force effective 31 January 2019, 99TV is a free-to-air channel.

== Programming ==
99TV telecasts political and current affairs with reporting network in both Telugu states. The channel also has programs on business, talk shows, cinema and sports.

== Availability ==
The channel was started on INSAT-4A (C-BAND) at 83.0°E. The other down-link parameters of the channel are frequency of 3921 MHz, symbol rate of 13000, and System on DVB -S2/QPSK/MPEG-4.

== See also ==
- List of Telugu-language television channels
