= Santosham Best Comedian Award =

Indian film award

The Santosham Best Comedian Award is given by the Santosham Film magazine as part of its annual Santosham Film Awards for Telugu films.

The award was first given in 2003. Here is a list of the award winners and the films for which they won.

Year	Actor	Film
2008	Brahmanandam	King
2005	Ali	Super
2004	Venu Madhav	Sye
2003
