= Ajay Bhupathi =

Indian film director and screenplay writer

- Born: Ajay Narasimha Naga Bhupathi Raju; Atreyapuram, Andhra Pradesh, India
- Occupations: Film director; screen writer; dialogue writer
- Years active: 2011–present
- Spouse: Sirisha (m. 2018)

Ajay Bhupathi (born Ajay Narasimha Naga Bhupathi Raju) is an Indian film director who predominantly works in Telugu cinema. He made his directorial debut film RX 100 which received positive reception.

== Career ==
Bhupathi started off his career as an associate to director/screenwriter Ramesh Varma and Veeru Potla. He worked with Ram Gopal Varma as an executive director in the film Vangaveeti, as chief co-director in the film Killing Veerappan and as associate director in films Attack and Veera. He worked as associate director on the film Doosukeltha with Veeru Potla. Bhupathi then made his directorial film RX 100. The film was remade in Hindi as Tadap.

His next film was Mahasamudram starring Sharwanand, Siddharth, Aditi Rao Hydari and Anu Emmanuel. His next directorial Mangalavaaram was released in November 2023.

== Personal life ==
He married his childhood friend Sirisha in August 2018, after assuring her parents in 2016 that he would make a successful debut.

== Filmography ==
Key
†	Denotes films that have not yet been released

Year	Film	Notes
2018	RX 100	SIIMA Award for Best Debut Director – Telugu
2021	Maha Samudram	
2023	Mangalavaaram	
2026	Srinivasa Mangapuram	
