= RX 100 (film) =

2018 Indian film by Ajay Bhupathi

- Theatrical release poster
- Directed by: Ajay Bhupathi
- Written by: Ajay Bhupathi
- Produced by: Ashok Reddy Gummakonda
- Starring: Kartikeya; Payal Rajput
- Cinematography: Raam Reddy
- Edited by: Praveen K. L.
- Music by: Chaitan Bharadwaj; Smaran
- Production company: Kartikeya Creative Works
- Release date: 12 July 2018
- Running time: 153 minutes
- Country: India
- Language: Telugu
- Budget: ₹2 crore
- Box office: est. ₹25–27.4 crore

RX 100 is a 2018 Indian Telugu-language romantic action thriller film written and directed by Ajay Bhupathi. The film stars Kartikeya and Payal Rajput with Rao Ramesh and Ramki playing supporting roles. The film released on 12 July 2018.

In 2020, Ajay Bhupathi confirmed the sequel of the film.

== Plot ==
Siva is a well-behaved man in Atreyapuram, Andhra Pradesh, who meets Indu, the daughter of a local politician Viswanatham, and they fall for each other. One day, Indu tells Siva that her father is planning to get her married to a man named Mahesh, and she tells him that they should not meet until she convinces her father.

Fearing that Vishwanatham would not accept their love, Siva asks Daddy to convince Vishwanatham to get them married. On the way to Viswanatham's house, Daddy meets with an accident and is admitted in the hospital. Viswanatham disapproves of their love and gets Indu married to Mahesh and sends her to the USA. Siva is thrashed by Vishwanatham's goons when he tries to stop Indu's wedding. Enraged about losing Indu, Siva becomes an aggressive, sadistic man. Two years later, he beats Viswanatham's men and burns his properties as revenge. After a while, Siva learns that Indu has returned from US and creates a ruckus twice in front of her house.

Daddy tells Siva's friend that when he had gone to Vishwanatham's house, he had overheard the conversation between him and Indu. To his and Vishwanatham's shock, Indu confesses that she was in love with Mahesh and he realises she used Shiva for her sexual desires. Vishwanatham accepts Indu's love, thinking that Mahesh would be better suited than Siva. After Daddy leaves the place, he met with an accident. It is revealed that Indu is a heartless, cruel, self-absorbed woman who uses people for her needs and is predatory in her actions. Even though Vishwanatham knows the truth about Indu and chastises her for it, he still continues to injure Siva for her sake. Vishwanatham sends his men to warn Siva not to see Indu until she and her husband Mahesh leave for USA, but Indu bribes them to kill Siva.

One of Viswanatham's men stabs and reveals the truth about Indu to Siva which leaves him devastated and heartbroken. He confronts Indu at her home severely wounded and curses her that her life is on his mercy and she is going to live with guilt forever. After this, Siva dies, leaving Daddy and Viswanatham devastated.

== Cast ==
- Kartikeya as Siva
- Payal Rajput as Indu
- Rao Ramesh as Vishwanatham
- Ramki as Daddy
- Tenali Shakuntala as Indu's grandmother
- Parvathy as Indu's mother
- Dayanand Reddy as SI Eshwar
- Laxman Meesala as Lakshman
- Karan as Nalli
- Vajja Venkata Giridhar in an uncredited role

== Production ==
Ashok Reddy, in an interview to The Times of India, said that "Ajay brought us the story of this film during the release of Premato Mee Karthik. We were so impressed with the story because it is different, raw and native. Premato Mee Karthik is a family movie, so this was going to be a huge deviation. But we were confident about the story and Ajay both, so we began shooting in December last year. During the shooting too, the technicians working on the film liked the way the film was shaping up. That's where the positive buzz began."

== Soundtrack ==
RX 100

Soundtrack album by Chaitan Bharadwaj
- Released: June 29, 2018
- Studios: S&B Music Mill (Hyderabad); Moksha Studios (Hyderabad)
- Genres: film soundtrack, romance, melody
- Length: 28:14
- Language: Telugu
- Label: Mango Music
- Producer: Chaitan Bharadwaj

Chaitan Bharadwaj chronology
RX 100 (2018)	Seven (2019)

Music video
- RX 100 Album on YouTube

The songs were composed by Chaitan Bharadwaj and the score was composed by Smaran. The song "Pillaa Raa" became one of the biggest hits of Telugu. It is sung by Anurag Kulkarni and composed by Chaitan Bharadwaj.

Track listing
No.	Title	Lyrics	Singer(s)	Length
1.	"Nippai Ragile"	Chaitanya Varma	Rahul Sipligunj	3:28
2.	"Reppalaninda"	Sriman	Haricharan	3:14
3.	"Adire Hrudayam"	Chaitanya Prasad	Karthik	4:47
4.	"Pillaa Raa"	Chaitanya Prasad	Anurag Kulkarni	3:57
5.	"Rudhiram Marigi"	Sirasri	Deepthi Parthasarathy & Sai Charan	3:44
6.	"Manasuni Patti"	Srimani	Haricharan, Uma Neha	3:44
7.	"Dhinaku Dhina Da"	Chaitanya Varma	Varam	4:37

== Reception ==
=== Box office ===
It became one of the few A-rated films in Tollywood with huge success at the box office. The film has collected a gross of ₹10 crores in the first four days. The film collected a total share of ₹12.45 crores.

=== Critical reception ===
Baradwaj Rangan of Film Companion South called it "a generic angry young man's generic love story, until a solid twist turns everything on its head". Suhas Yellapantula of The Times of India stated "Take away the blood and gore and there's a story here. RX 100 touches a rather unexplored subject but falters in its execution. You can't help but wonder why the director plays around with so many different camera angles and tries to create a dark setting. RX 100 has sex, tears and a lot of blood, but the essence of the film is somewhere lost in between. Just like that RX 100 bike which is in focus all the time, but in reality, is insignificant."

Srivathsan Nadadhur of The Hindu wrote about the film that "Director Ajay Bhupathi's raw storytelling is a plus for RX 100, the narrative borders on voyeurism at times, but the filmmaker displays enough maturity to not make it seem crass. His inexperience still shows, though, too many moments of nothingness, an indulgent screenplay goes overboard in exploring the angst of the male protagonist. The second hour is inconsistent, the intensity of a full-blown action-romance is amiss despite potent writing. The lead protagonist Karthikeya gets a dream role, yet it's too big a shoe to fill in his debut."

== Awards and nominations ==
Year	Award(s)	Category	Recipient	Result
2018	Zee Cine Awards Telugu	Best Playback Singer - Male	Anurag Kulkarni	Won
2018	Zee Cine Awards Telugu	Best Music Director	Chaitan Bharadwaj	Nominated
2018	Zee Cine Awards Telugu	Best Find of the Year - Male	Kartikeya	Won
2019	8th South Indian International Movie Awards	Best Male Playback Singer (Telugu)	Anurag Kulkarni	Won
2019	8th South Indian International Movie Awards	Best Music Director (Telugu)	Chaitan Bharadwaj	Nominated
2019	8th South Indian International Movie Awards	Best Female Debut (Telugu)	Payal Rajput	Nominated
2019	8th South Indian International Movie Awards	Best Debut Director (Telugu)	Ajay Bhupathi	Won
2019	17th Santosham Film Awards	Best Actor Award	Kartikeya	Won
2019	17th Santosham Film Awards	Best Character Actor	Ramki	Won
2019	17th Santosham Film Awards	Best Male Playback Singer	Anurag Kulkarni for "Pillaa Raa"	Won
2019	66th Filmfare Awards South	Best Male Playback Singer – Telugu	Anurag Kulkarni for "Pillaa Raa"	Nominated
2019	66th Filmfare Awards South	Best Lyricist – Telugu	Chaitanya Prasad	Nominated

== Remakes ==
The film was to be remade in Tamil with Aadhi Pinisetty, but the film never entered production.

A Hindi remake starring Tara Sutaria and debutant Ahan Shetty was announced in March 2019, filming began on 6 August with the title Tadap. Produced by Sajid Nadiadwala, directed by Milan Luthria and presented by Fox Star Studios, it released theatrically on 3 December 2021.

Another film, a remake, is the Kannada film Shiva 143, starring Dheeran Ramkumar and Manvita Kamath in the lead roles was released on 26 August 2022 in theatres. It is produced by Jayanna and Bhogendhra, directed by Anil Kumar. In 2020, Ajay Bhupathi confirmed the sequel of the film.
