= Zee Cine Awards Telugu =

Awards presented from Zee Telugu in Tollywood

- Sponsored by: Multiple
- Country: India
- Presented by: Zee Entertainment Enterprises
- Formerly called: Zee Golden Awards
- Established: 2017
- First award: 2017
- Website: zeetelugu.zee5.com

Television/radio coverage
- Network: Zee Telugu
- Related: Zee Cine Awards

The Zee Cine Awards Telugu is an awards ceremony for the Telugu cinema and Telugu music. They were instituted in December 2017, under the name Zee Telugu Golden Awards to recognise excellence in Telugu cinema and Telugu Music.

== History ==
Zee Telugu, a Telugu cable television channel of Essel Group's Zee Entertainment Enterprise Limited (ZEEL) announced in 2017 an awards ceremony to honour the best in Tollywood film and Telugu music.

The first Awards ceremony was held at Annapurna Studios in Hyderabad, India on 17 December 2017.

== See also ==
- Telugu cinema
- Cinema of India
- Cinema of South India
- Zee Telugu
