= Ustaad Bhagat Singh =

2026 Indian film by Harish Shankar

- Theatrical release poster
- Directed by: Harish Shankar
- Screenplay by: Dasaradh; Ramesh Reddy
- Story by: Harish Shankar
- Produced by: Naveen Yerneni; Yalamanchili Ravi Shankar
- Starring: Pawan Kalyan; Raashii Khanna; Sreeleela; R. Parthiban; K. S. Ravikumar
- Cinematography: Ayananka Bose
- Edited by: Karthika Srinivas
- Music by: Score: Thaman S; Songs: Devi Sri Prasad
- Production company: Mythri Movie Makers
- Release date: 19 March 2026
- Running time: 154 minutes
- Country: India
- Language: Telugu
- Budget: ₹150 crore
- Box office: ₹95 crore

Ustaad Bhagat Singh (transl. Master Bhagat Singh) is a 2026 Indian Telugu-language action comedy film directed by Harish Shankar and produced by Mythri Movie Makers. The film stars Pawan Kalyan in the titular role, alongside Raashii Khanna, Sreeleela, R. Parthiban, K. S. Ravikumar, Ramki, Gautami, Nawab Shah, Rao Ramesh, Jayaprakash and others in supporting roles.

The film was released theatrically on 19 March 2026 coinciding with Ugadi to mixed reviews from critics and audiences. Despite the festive release and reviews, it was Harish Shankar's second consecutive commercial failure after Mr. Bachchan (2024).

== Plot ==
Chandrasekhar Rao, a teacher, educates the people and also the children in a school. There, he meets a boy and enrolls him in a school, and the boy later grows to be rebellious and trashes a warden as he was mistreating a female teacher. Chandrasekhar Rao, after seeing the boy's potential names him as Ustaad Bhagat Singh.

After 24 years, Chandrasekhar Rao, now the chief minister, survives an assassination attempt and is sent to a safe place; another politician gets to be an acting CM, but gets killed. Later, a ruthless politician, Chadala Marri Nalla Nagappa, comes and offers condolences to the politician son, and it is revealed that Nagappa is behind the assassinations as he aims to be the CM, and he later takes charge as the deputy CM. Nagappa's younger son came from America and goes to the Nallamala forest as Singaiah, Nagappa's right-hand man, welcomes him. Nagappa's younger son realises that his Ganja went missing and CI Kesava is behind it. He then storms into the police station and humiliates Kesava. Bhagat Singh, now a playful forest guard, comes to the rescue and kills the entire gang and semmily kills Nagappa's younger son.

Meanwhile, Shloka, the daughter of a wealthy industrialist and her family comes to the forest and Bhagat is assigned to welcome them and make their stay comfortable. It is revealed that Shloka came here to forget about her boyfriend Gopi, which Bhagat and his friend made her to forget after some funny incidents.

Bhagat is revealed to be the man behind the kidnapping of Nagappa's son keeps him captive. Nagappa later came to know about the kidnapping and calls Miya Bhai, a ruthless leader who later calls Faizal a dreaded terrorist, to find Nagappa's son. Then Faizal and his gang kidnapped Shloka to lure Bhagat to their trap. Singaiah guides Faizal and his gang to the area where Nagappa's son is held captive. The terriosts secure Nagappas son and captures Bhagat. On video Miya Bhai gets shocked that Bhagat is behind this and asks for forgiveness. As Naggappa's youger son prepares to kill Bhagat Singyya stops him and reavels himself as an ex forest ranger. He frees Bhagat. Bhagat later kills Faizal's gang and keeps him captive. Afzal Baghdadi a dreaded terrorist and Faizal's mentor vows vengeance on the man who kidnap. Bhagat tells Nagappa's son that he had a grudge on his father. Singaiah later reveals he was with Bhagat all along. Shloka gets surprised and asks Singaiah about Bhagat. Singaiah narrates Bhagat's past.

Past: 6 years ago, a violent riot happens in a temple procession where a gang kills priests. Bhagat Singh, an ACP, kills the gang ruthlessly and learns that Nagappa has sent them to create a riot. Enraged, Bhagat Singh storms to Nagappa's house where he warns Nagappa to stay on his limits. His elder son comes to the police station to find Bhagat who warned his father. Bhagat later slashes him with a broken tea cup and asks him to get out. Bhagat shoots miya bhai who is a dreaded terriost and makes a funny deal to take asif another terriorst. Meanwhile, Leela a RJ falls in love with Bhagat. After many funny incidents Bhagat reciprocates her feelings. Nagappa was angered at this and sends Shiva and Kashi, as well as their henchmen to finish off Bhagat. Bhagat finds them and encounters Shiva and kills Kashi in the bazaar. Later, Pallavi, Leela's friend gets raped by Nagappa's son and their gang. She tells Bhagat to kill those people and succumbs to her injuries. Bhagat storms into Nagappa's house to arrest his son, but Nagappa used his influence ahead of time to get Bhagat suspended. Enraged over his suspension and Pallavi's assault Bhagat kills Nagappa's son with a knife. Bhagat proposes marriage to Leela. However, on their wedding day Leela gets killed and Bhagat realises that Afzal did this on the orders of Nagappa and kills Afzal's gang. Bhagat kidnaps his younger son to exact revenge.

Present: Bagdadi and his gang later comes to kill Bhagat, but Faizal was revealed to be RAW officer Riaz Khan and kills Bagadadi's gang. Riaz also reveals that his team had killed the ministers in the parliament building as they were corrupt. Bhagat later kills Afzal as revenge for killing Leela. Later, Bhagat goes to Nagappa's house and tells him that his mission is over and decides his fate. Shocked at Bhagat's win, Nagappa commits suicide. Chandrasekhar Rao gets cured, and he and Bhagat reunite.

== Cast ==
- Pawan Kalyan as ACP "Ustaad" Bhagat Singh
- Raashii Khanna as Shloka
- Sreeleela as RJ Leela
- R. Parthiban as Chadala Marri Nalla Nagappa
- Brahmanandam as Satyanarayana
- K. S. Ravikumar as CM Chandrasekhar Rao, Bhagat Singh’s father-figure
- Gautami as Krishnaveni, Bhagat Singh's adoptive mother
- Mir Sarwar as Afzal Baghdadi
- Nawab Shah as Ajmal Rahim
- B. S. Avinash as Miya Bhai
- Srinath Maganti as Officer Riyaz alias Faizal
- Kamal Kamaraju as Officer Kamal
- Rao Ramesh as Ex-Forest Officer Singaiah
- Jayaprakash as Madhusudhan Rao, Shloka's father
- Ramki as IG Ramesh Chandra
- L. B. Sriram as SubbaRao, Leela's grandfather
- Goparaju Ramana as Sreenu Swami
- Prabhas Sreenu as Katta, Bhagat Singh's friend
- Satyam Rajesh as Dr. Samanvi, Shloka’s psychiatrist
- Praveen as Dr Samanvi’s assistant
- Murali Mohan as Ex-Chief Minister
- Kireeti Damaraju as Journalist
- Gundu Sudarshan as Resort Owner
- Chammak Chandra as Cafe customer
- Temper Vamsi as Nalla Seenu, Nalla Nagappa's elder Son
- Killi Kranthi as Nalla Nagappa’s younger Son
- Mathew Varghese as Chandrasekhar Rao's PA
- Vadlamani Srinivas as Nalla Nagappa’s PA
- Mahesh Achanta as School Peon
- Pammi Sai as Traffic Police
- Pallavi Dora as Pallavi, Leela’s best friend
- Vamsi Chaganti as Pallavi’s boyfriend
- Kishore Raju Vasistha as Minister
- Gujjuru Hemanth As a Muslim Character

== Production ==
=== Development ===
The film was announced as Bhavadeeyudu Bhagat Singh on 9 September 2021. It marks the second collaboration of Pawan Kalyan with Harish Shankar after Gabbar Singh (2012). Later in December 2022, title was changed to Ustaad Bhagat Singh. The film's launch event with a pooja ceremony was held on 11 December 2022 at Ramanaidu Studios with cast and crew.

=== Casting ===
Sreeleela was cast as the female lead. Later in July 2025, Raashii Khanna joined the cast to play a pivotal role with a character poster, and stated to be a parallel female lead role as Shloka, it marks her first collaboration with Kalyan and Harish, later it was revealed that she was the replacement for actress Sakshi Vaidya. Ashutosh Rana, Nawab Shah, B. S. Avinash, Gautami, Naga Mahesh, Narra Srinu, Chammak Chandra, Giri and Temper Vamsi would play important roles. Later in October 2025, Khanna revealed that she has signed the film, without reading the script, only for Pawan Kalyan.

=== Filming and post-production ===
Principal photography commenced on 5 April 2023. A police station was erected in Aluminium factory, Hyderabad for film's first schedule. Sreeleela joined the set on 11 April. The first schedule for filming ended on 15 April. In June 2023, the team erected a massive set for the film's next schedule in East Coast Road. Raashii Khanna joined the sets in July 2025, and wrapped up her portions in December 2025. After wrapped up in December, the team moved into post-production work in January 2026, with dubbing works. Raashii Khanna started dubbing for her portions in February 2026.

== Music ==
Ustaad Bhagat Singh

Soundtrack album by Devi Sri Prasad
- Released: 12 March 2026
- Recorded: 2024
- Genre: Soundtrack
- Length: 19:56
- Language: Telugu
- Label: Sony Music
- Producer: Devi Sri Prasad

Devi Sri Prasad chronology
Junior (2025)	Ustaad Bhagat Singh (2026)	Sing Geetham (2026)

Devi Sri Prasad is hired as the music director. Music session began in May 2023. The audio rights were acquired by Sony Music India. Additionally, the remixed version of the song "Ee Manase Se Se" from the 1998 film Tholi Prema is used in the film. A song from the film Rudraveena, "Taraliraada" has been remixed and used in the film.

Track listing
No.	Title	Lyrics	Singer(s)	Length
1.	"Dekhlenge Saala"	Bhaskarabhatla Ravi Kumar	Vishal Dadlani, Haripriya	4:02
2.	"Aura of Ustaad"	Chandrabose	Devi Sri Prasad, S. P. Abhishek & The Indian Choral Ensemble	4:10
3.	"Collar Ey Etthara"	Kasarla Shyam	Ram Miriyala	4:20

== Release ==
=== Theatrical ===
Ustaad Bhagat Singh was scheduled to be released theatrically on 26 March 2026, but was preponed to 19 March 2026. Initially, it was planned for a release in 2024, but got delayed as Harish Shankar moved on to direct Mr. Bachchan (2024), reuniting with Ravi Teja, and Kalyan went on to finish the shooting of Hari Hara Veera Mallu and They Call Him OG (both in 2025).

=== Home media ===
The post-theatrical digital streaming rights of the film were originally acquired by Amazon Prime Video, but later reverted to Netflix, while the satellite rights were acquired by Zee Telugu. The film began streaming on Netflix from 16 April 2026 in Telugu along with dubbed versions of Hindi, Tamil, Kannada, and Malayalam languages.

== Reception ==
=== Box office ===
The two-day worldwide gross collection of the film is ₹65 crore with a distributors' share of ₹39 crore.

=== Critical recption ===
The film received mixed reviews from critics. Nikhil Waiker from Deccan Herald rated 1/5 stars and stated, "Pawan Kalyan delivers another disappointment".

BVS Prakash of Deccan Chronicle rated with 1.5 out of 5 stars and wrote "Ustaad Bhagat Singh is a predictable and outdated mass entertainer that fails to capitalise on its star power. With a weak script and inconsistent execution, it struggles to leave any meaningful impact. T Maruthi Acharya of India Today rated 1.5 out of 5 stars and wrote "Ustaad Bhagat Singh is a routine, outdated commercial entertainer that depends almost entirely on Pawan Kalyan’s presence. It offers a few moments for fans, but very little beyond that. For those walking in for the star, it might deliver in parts. For everyone else, it feels like a film that expects you to leave too much outside the theatre before stepping in."

Yashaswini Sri of The Indian Express rated 1.5 out of 5 stars and wrote "Ustaad Bhagat Singh is the kind of film that fans will find moments to cheer in, but general audiences are likely to walk out feeling they have seen this before, and done better. The aftertaste of watching the film is rather bad. Pawan Kalyan does what he does best, and there is genuine enjoyment in watching him work. But a good lead performance alone cannot carry two and a half hours when the writing is outdated, the music is underwhelming, and the supporting cast is either underused or underwritten. The result is a film that neither fully satisfies as a mindless entertainer nor earns its more serious ambitions."
