= Mythri Movie Makers =

Indian film studio

- Industry: Entertainment
- Founded: 2013
- Founders: Naveen Yerneni; Yalamanchili Ravi Shankar
- Headquarters: Hyderabad, Telangana, India
- Area served: India
- Key people: Naveen Yerneni; Yalamanchili Ravi Shankar
- Products: Film; Television
- Services: Film production Film distribution
- Website: mythrimoviemakers.com

Mythri Movie Makers is an Indian film production and distribution company established by Naveen Yerneni, Yalamanchili Ravi Shankar in 2013. The production company mainly produces and distributes in Telugu films.

Notable films produced by the company include Srimanthudu (2015), Janatha Garage (2016), Rangasthalam (2018), Uppena (2021), Dude (2025), along with the Pushpa and Mathu Vadalara franchises. The Pushpa franchise is the third highest-grossing franchise in Indian cinema.

In 2019, CVM left the company and started his own production house, Vyra Entertainments, with Vijender Reddy Teegala. Naveen Yerneni and Yalamanchili Ravi Shankar are now the heads of Mythri Movie Makers.

== Productions ==
The company's first production was Srimanthudu starring Mahesh Babu, Shruti Haasan, Jagapathi Babu, Rajendra Prasad, Mukesh Rishi, Sampath Raj, Harish Uthaman and directed by Koratala Siva.

In 2018 the company produced 3 movies. Rangasthalam, starring Ram Charan Teja, Samantha Ruth Prabhu, Aadhi Pinisetty, Jagapathi Babu and Prakash Raj in lead roles, was directed by Sukumar. Devi Sri Prasad composed the score, and R. Rathnavelu handled the cinematography.

== Distribution ==
Later, Mythri Movie Makers ventured into distribution operations in Nizam. Starting with films from their own productions, the company later started to distribute movies of other banners as well, while leasing and restoring single-screen theatres for additional venues. They then started the second phase of expansion, surpassing their Nizam base to become the only company to acquire the entire Telugu theatrical rights of a Tamil, Kannada and Malayalam movie in Telugu states. In 2026, Mythri has become a notable distribution company in Nizam and Andhra Pradesh, distributing movies of major producers.

== Exhibition ==
Mythri Movie Makers also went onto enter the film exhibition business by leasing single screen cinemas in Andhra Pradesh and Telangana through negotiations for leases with owners across the two state, for that, Mythri spent up to ₹1 crore per theatre on refurbishments.

In April 2024, reports suggested that Mythri had acquired approximately 150 odd theatres across the Telugu states, with an industry source describing the acquisition as "turning exhibitors to have better control over theatres and release their films without any fuss." The same report claimed that Mythri was also doing this to ensure they weren't "reliant on the screens they have with other distributors."

== Filmography ==
=== Production ===
Key
†	Denotes productions that have not yet been released

Year	Title	Director	Language	Notes
2015	Srimanthudu	Koratala Siva	Telugu	Co-produced with G. Mahesh Babu Entertainment
2016	Janatha Garage	Koratala Siva	Telugu	
2018	Rangasthalam	Sukumar	Telugu	
2018	Savyasachi	Chandoo Mondeti	Telugu	
2018	Amar Akbar Anthony	Srinu Vaitla	Telugu	
2019	Chitralahari	Kishore Tirumala	Telugu	
2019	Dear Comrade	Bharath Khamma	Telugu	Co-produced with Big Ben Pictures
2019	Nani's Gang Leader	Vikram Kumar	Telugu	
2019	Mathu Vadalara	Ritesh Rana	Telugu	
2021	Uppena	Buchi Babu Sana	Telugu	Co-produced with Sukumar Writings
2021	Pushpa: The Rise	Sukumar	Telugu	Co-produced with Muttamsetty Media
2022	Sarkaru Vaari Paata	Parasuram	Telugu	Co-produced with 14 Reels Plus, G. Mahesh Babu Entertainment
2022	Ante Sundaraniki	Vivek Athreya	Telugu	
2022	Happy Birthday	Ritesh Rana	Telugu	Co-produced with Clap Media
2022	Aa Ammayi Gurinchi Meeku Cheppali	Mohana Krishna Indraganti	Telugu	Co-produced with Benchmark Studios
2023	Veera Simha Reddy	Gopichand Malineni	Telugu	
2023	Waltair Veerayya	Bobby Kolli	Telugu	
2023	Amigos	Rajendra Reddy	Telugu	
2023	Sathi Gani Rendu Ekaralu	Abhinav Reddy Danda	Telugu	Released on Aha
2023	Kushi	Shiva Nirvana	Telugu	
2023	Adrishya Jalakangal	Dr. Biju	Malayalam	
2023	Farrey	Soumendra Padhi	Hindi	
2024	Nadikar	Jean Paul Lal	Malayalam	
2024	Gandhi Tatha Chettu	Padmavathi Malladi	Telugu	
2024	Pushpa 2: The Rule	Sukumar	Telugu	
2025	Robinhood	Venky Kudumula	Telugu	
2025	Good Bad Ugly	Adhik Ravichandran	Tamil	
2025	Jaat	Gopichand Malineni	Hindi	
2025	8 Vasantalu	Phanindra Narsetti	Telugu	
2025	Dude	Keerthiswaran	Tamil	
2025	Andhra King Taluka	Mahesh Babu P.	Telugu	
2026	Ustaad Bhagat Singh	Harish Shankar	Telugu	
2026	Irumudi	Shiva Nirvana	Telugu	Co-produced with T-Series Films
2026	Modha Rathri	Raja Karuppasamy	Tamil	
2026	Ranabaali	Rahul Sankrityan	Telugu	Co-produced with T-Series Films
2026	418	Kirtan Nadagouda	Telugu	
2026	DNK †	Sreenu Kambala	Telugu	
2027	Fauzi †	Hanu Raghavapudi	Telugu	Co-produced with T-Series Films
2027	Dragon †	Prashanth Neel	Telugu	Co-produced with T-Series Films, N. T. R. Arts
2027	#Soori07 †	R. Ravikumar	Tamil	
TBA	RX †	Vishal Venkat	Tamil	Co-produced with G Squad

=== Distribution ===
Key
†	Denotes productions that have not yet been released

Year	Title	Notes
2023	Salaar: Part 1 – Ceasefire	Nizam only
2023	Meter	Nizam only
2024	Hanu-Man	Nizam only
2024	Operation Valentine	Nizam only
2024	Aadujeevitham	Andhra Pradesh and Telangana
2024	Manjummel Boys	Andhra Pradesh and Telangana
2024	Love Guru	Andhra Pradesh and Telangana
2024	Prasanna Vadanam	Telangana and Tamil Nadu
2024	Krishnamma	Andhra Pradesh and Telangana
2024	Bhaje Vaayu Vegam	Nizam only
2024	Gam Gam Ganesha	Nizam only
2024	Satyabhama	Nizam only
2024	Manamey	Nizam only
2024	Maharaja	Nizam only
2024	Harom Hara	Nizam only
2024	Nindha	Nizam only
2024	Darling	Nizam only
2024	Shivam Bhaje	Nizam only
2024	Buddy	Nizam only
2024	Thangalaan	Nizam only
2024	Demonte Colony 2	Nizam only
2024	Mr. Bachchan	Nizam only
2024	Maruthi Nagar Subramanyam	Andhra Pradesh and Telangana
2024	The Greatest of All Time	Andhra Pradesh and Telangana
2024	Utsavam	Andhra Pradesh and Telangana
2024	ARM	Andhra Pradesh and Telangana
2024	Pottel	Nizam only
2024	Kanguva	Nizam only
2025	Dragon	Nizam and Ceded areas only
2025	Sabdham	Nizam only
2025	Kingston	Nizam only
2025	Veera Dheera Soora	Nizam only
2025	Kaliyugam 2064	Nizam only
2025	3BHK	Andhra Pradesh and Telangana
2025	Junior	Andhra Pradesh and Telangana
2025	Hari Hara Veera Mallu	Nizam only
2025	Su From So	Andhra Pradesh and Telangana
2025	Sundarakanda	Nizam only
2025	Tribanadhari Barbarik	Nizam only
2025	Ghaati	Nizam only
2025	Mirai	Nizam only
2025	Kiss	Andhra Pradesh and Telangana
2025	Kantara: Chapter 1	Nizam only
2026	Happy Raj	Andhra Pradesh and Telangana
2026	Papam Prathap	Andhra Pradesh and Telangana
2026	Jetlee	Andhra Pradesh and Telangana
2026	The Paradise	Andhra Pradesh and Telangana
2026	Mandaadi	Andhra Pradesh and Telangana

== Awards and nominations ==
Film	Award	Ceremony	Category	Result
2015	Srimanthudu	Gaddar Telangana Film Awards	Third Best Feature Film	Won
2017	Janatha Garage	IIFA Utsavam	Best Film	Won
2017	Janatha Garage	Gaddar Telangana Film Awards	Third Best Feature Film	Won
2017	Janatha Garage	Nandi Awards	Best Popular Feature Film	Won
2017	Janatha Garage	South Indian International Movie Awards	Best Film – Telugu	Nominated
2019	Rangasthalam	Gaddar Telangana Film Awards	Second Best Feature Film	Won
2019	Rangasthalam	Filmfare Awards South	Best Film – Telugu	Nominated
2019	Rangasthalam	South Indian International Movie Awards	Best Film – Telugu	Nominated
2022	Uppena	Gaddar Telangana Film Awards	Third Best Feature Film	Won
2022	Pushpa: The Rise	Nickelodeon Kids' Choice Awards India	Favourite Movie (South)	Won

== Controversey ==
In 2026, Mythri Movie Makers was caught in a big dispute between Telugu producers and single-screen theatre owners in Telangana over revenue sharing of theatrical release. On 3 April 2026, 23 single-screen cinemas in the Nizam region made a first mover decision to switch to percentages, they announced the 60-50-40 split that they wanted for the first three weeks of a film’s run. There was opposition from the Telugu Film Producers Guild to the idea, and only Dil Raju, one of the producers guild members, was supportive. However, the producer that faced the harshest resistance from exhibitors was Mythri, which was labelled as "the most publicly and consistently antagonistic producer to any deviation from the rental system".

The first victim of the row was Jetlee which had all its screens pulled out on its first day of release in Telangana on 1 May 2026 by the exhibitors, Mythri Movie Distributor's designated partner Kethireddy Sasidhar told "We are at loggerheads with some single screens on "weekly rental and revenue sharing terms" and the exhibitor opposed the extension of the blockade in the multiplex properties. In which this exhibitor has no "difference of opinion" as "unfair" and one party of the trade imposed this pressure on the other is "coercive".

As Ram Charan's Peddi, neared its worldwide release on 4 June 2026 by Mythri, the Dispute had turned into a statewide agitation. From late May 2026, more than 180 Telangana exhibitors again urged that the percentage system should be followed for Peddi as well as all other future releases, arguing that the same model was already being followed without any problems in Karnataka, Kerala, Tamil Nadu and Maharashtra. The exhibitors opposed the other suggestion put forward by Mythri's Ravi Shankar for a grading system for theatres, alleging that such demands were "unfair" and caused "further difficulties". "Times Now" reported that Mythri was one of the strongest adversaries to the exhibitors’ plan, and that they explained that they weren’t criticizing "Peddi" as they stood for the much-needed structural reforms by exploiting the film's release date. It was then successfully negotiated by actor Chiranjeevi and a percentage-based revenue sharing agreement was finalised prior to the film's release in Peddi.
