= Ritesh Rana =

Indian film director and screenwriter

- Occupations: Director, screenwriter
- Years active: 2019–present

Ritesh Rana is an Indian film director and screenwriter, who works in Telugu films.

== Early life and career ==
Ritesh grew up in Hyderabad and watched several films starring Chiranjeevi alongside his family. After watching Aithe by Chandra Sekhar Yeleti, he decided to enter films. He graduated with a Bachelor of Commerce (Honours). He took up an animation course, which taught him editing, alongside a Master of Arts in Mass Communication at Sikkim Manipal University before making short films. His debut film Mathu Vadalara was well received for its mix of crime and comedy. He described his next film Happy Birthday as a "surreal crime comedy". His next films were Mathu Vadalara 2, a buddy cop film similar to Bad Boys and Brooklyn Nine-Nine, and Jetlee, which was set entirely in an airplane. While Happy Birthday and Mathu Vadalara 2 received above average reviews, Jetlee released to negative reviews. Kaala Bhairava, Satya, and Vennela Kishore are his frequent collaborators.

== Filmography ==
Year	Title	Notes
2019	Mathu Vadalara	
2022	Happy Birthday	
2024	Mathu Vadalara 2	
2026	Jetlee	
