= Pottel =

2024 Indian film by Sahit Mothkuri

- Theatrical release poster
- Directed by: Sahit Mothkuri
- Written by: Sahit Mothkuri
- Produced by: Nishank Reddy Kuruthi; Suresh Kumar Sadige
- Starring: Yuva Chandraa; Ananya Nagalla; Noel Sean
- Cinematography: Monish Bhupathi Raju
- Edited by: Karthika Srinivas
- Music by: Shekar Chandra
- Production companies: Prangnya Sannidhi Creations; NISA Entertainments
- Distributed by: Mythri Movie Makers
- Release date: 25 October 2024
- Running time: 160 minutes
- Country: India
- Language: Telugu

Pottel (transl. Sheep) is a 2024 Indian Telugu-language drama thriller film written and directed by Sahit Mothkuri. It stars Yuva Chandraa, Ananya Nagalla, Noel Sean and Ajay in primarily roles. The film showcases the traditions and culture of rural Telangana. It also won the state Gaddar Award for Second Best Feature Film.

== Plot ==
The film is set in the remote village of Gurramgattu in Telangana during the 1970s, where a powerful and oppressive social hierarchy dominates rural life. Pedda Gangadhar (Yuva Chandraa), a local shepherd, has a singular mission: to educate his daughter Saraswati and challenge the village's deeply entrenched social norms. He is assigned the sacred responsibility of caring for a special sheep (Pottel) that is to be sacrificed during a traditional ritual held every 12 years.

The village is controlled by Patel (Ajay), a tyrannical leader who actively prevents lower-caste villagers from accessing education and perpetuates systemic oppression. Patel believes that education empowers people to question authority and therefore works to suppress the villagers' aspirations.

Gangadhar, supported by his wife Bujjamma (Ananya Nagalla), persistently fights against Patel's dominance and attempts to secure a better future for his daughter. When Gangadhar loses the sacred Pottel sheep intended for the ritual, Patel threatens to sacrifice Gangadhar's daughter if the sheep is not recovered.

The narrative explores themes of education, social empowerment, caste dynamics, and individual resilience against systemic oppression. Gangadhar's journey becomes a powerful statement about challenging traditional power structures and fighting for a child's right to education.

== Cast ==
- Yuva Chandraa as Gangadhari
- Ananya Nagalla as Bujjamma
- Ajay as Patel
- Noel Sean
- Priyanka Sharma
- Srikanth Iyengar as Teacher Duryodhana
- Chatrapati Sekhar
- Baby Thanasvi as Saraswathi

== Music ==
Pottel

Soundtrack album by Shekar Chandra
- Released: 2024
- Label: T-Series
- Producer: Shekar Chandra

Shekar Chandra chronology
Bhale Unnade (2024)	Pottel (2024)

The film's soundtrack album and background were composed by Shekar Chandra.

All lyrics are written by Kasarla Shyam; all music is composed by Shekar Chandra.

Track list
No.	Title	Singer(s)	Length
1.	"Nagiro"	Anurag Kulkarni, Lalasa R	4:19
2.	"Vavvare"	Rahul Sipligunj	3:11
3.	"Shankara"	Sandilya Pisapati	4:19
4.	"Bujji Meka"	Kaala Bhairava	3:43
5.	"Vavvare DJ remix"	Rahul Sipligunj	2:45

== Release ==
The film released on 25 October 2024, and was distributed by Mythri Movie Makers.

== Reception ==
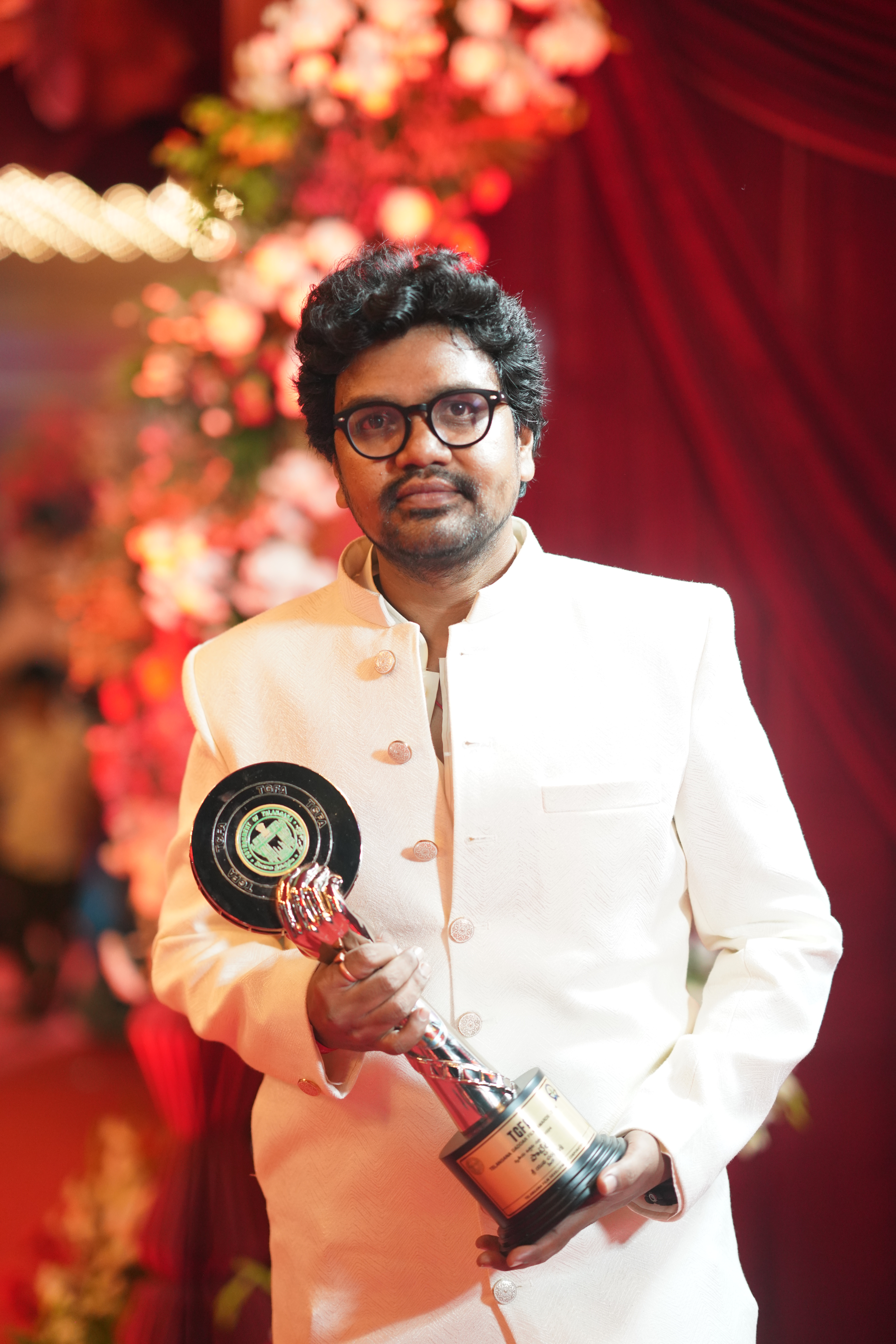
Sahit Mothkuri With Gaddar Award for Second Best Feature Film 2024

Sangeetha Devi Dundoo of The Hindu stated that "Yuva Chandra, Ananya and Ajay are pitch-perfect in their characters and hold the film together", further opining that "If Pottel had relied less on amplifying Patel’s brutality and resorted to smarter storytelling, it would have made for a compelling, less explored story from the hinterlands". Writing to The New Indian Express, Aditya Devulapally felt that the story was powerful but was effected by complicated narration. He further appreciated the performances of lead cast, score, cinematography and production design. The Hans India stated, "Pottel is a well-meaning film that combines social commentary with strong performances, offering a touching narrative about defiance and hope".
