= Krishnamma (film) =

2024 Indian telugu film

- Theatrical release poster
- Directed by: V. V. Gopala Krishna
- Written by: V. V. Gopala Krishna
- Produced by: Krishna Kommalapati
- Starring: Satya Dev; Krishna Burugula; Athira Raj; Archana Iyer; Laxman Meesala
- Cinematography: Sunny Kurapati
- Edited by: Tammiraju
- Music by: Kaala Bhairava
- Production company: Arunachala Creations
- Distributed by: Koratala Siva; Mythri Movie Makers; Primeshow Entertainment
- Release date: 10 May 2024
- Running time: 130 minutes
- Country: India
- Language: Telugu

Krishnamma (transl. Mother Krishna) is a 2024 Indian Telugu-language action drama film written and directed by V. V. Gopala Krishna and presented by Koratala Siva; produced by Krishna Kommalapati, under Arunachala Creations. It stars Satya Dev, Krishna Burugula, Athira Raj, Archana Iyer, and Laxman Meesala in the lead roles. It was released on 10 May 2024.

== Plot ==
Set in the streets of Vinchipeta in Vijayawada, "Krishnamma" follows the lives of three orphans: Bhadra, Koti, and Shiva. Despite not being related by blood, they share a strong sense of brotherhood. Their early lives involve minor criminal activities, with Shiva ending up in prison at a young age.

Upon his release, Shiva decides to lead an honest life and starts a printing business. However, Bhadra and Koti remain involved in their criminal activities, unable to leave behind the lifestyle they are familiar with.

The story takes a turn when the trio finds themselves in urgent need of a large sum of money. They decide to undertake one last operation, which goes wrong. This event triggers a series of unforeseen challenges and personal dilemmas, testing their bond and compelling them to face the consequences of their actions.

== Cast ==
- Satya Dev as Bhadra
- Krishna Burugula as Shiva
- Athira Raj as Meena
- Archana Iyer as Padma
- Laxman Meesala as Koti
- Raghu Kunche as ACP Vijay Kumar
- Nanda Gopal as a cop
- Archana Shastry as a mother
- Anish Ram S as a cop

== Production ==
On 18 August 2021, The announcement of the film was made through a Muhurtham pooja ceremony marking Satya Dev's 25th film in Hyderabad by Dil Raju and Harish Shankar.

On 4 July 2022, Satyadev shared the first look and title of the film on Twitter. and on 4 August 2022, the teaser of the film was released by Sai Durgha Tej.

The pre-release event of the film took place on 1 May 2024, S. S. Rajamouli, Koratala Siva, Anil Ravipudi, and Gopichand Malineni graced the occasion and launched the trailer.

== Music ==
Krishnamma

Film score by Kaala Bhairava
- Released: 10 May 2024
- Genre: Film score
- Length: 15:04
- Language: Telugu
- Label: Saregama
- Producer: Kaala Bhairava

Kaala Bhairava chronology
| Bhaag Saale (2023) | Krishnamma (2024) | Mathu Vadalara 2 (2024) |
External audio
- Audio Jukebox on YouTube

Singles from Krishnamma
- 1. "Emavutundo Manalo" Released: 19 August 2022; 2. "Krishnamma title song" Released: 2 September 2022; 3. "Durgamma" Released: 11 April 2024; 4. "The Theme of Vengeance" Released: 19 April 2024

The soundtrack album and background score were composed by Kaala Bhairava and Saregama secured the audio rights. On 19 August 2022, "Emavutundo Manalo" lyrical song was released by director Harish Shankar, the song lyrics was written by Anantha Sriram and was sung by Sid Sriram.

The "Krishnamma" title song was released on 2 September 2022 and sung by Anurag Kulkarni and written by Anantha Siram. on 11 April 2024, "Durgamma" song was released which had lyrics written by Anantha Sriram and sung by Saketh Komanduri. followed by the release of "The Theme of Vengeance" song on 19 April 2024, the song lyrics was written by Anantha Sriram and sung by Dhiipu and Kaala Bhairava.

Krishnamma track listing
| No. | Title | Lyrics | Singer(s) | Length |
|---|---|---|---|---|
| 1. | "Emavutundo Manalo" | Anantha Sriram | Sid Sriram | 4:01 |
| 2. | "Krishnamma Title Song" | Anantha Sriram | Anurag Kulkarni | 4:00 |
| 3. | "Durgamma" | Anantha Sriram | Saketh Komanduri | 3:26 |
| 4. | "The Theme of Vengeance" | Anantha Sriram | Dhiipu; Kaala Bhairava | 3:37 |
| Total length: | | | | 15:04 |

== Release ==
=== Theatrical ===
Krishnamma was released on 10 May 2024.

=== Distribution ===
Mythri Movie Makers and Primeshow Entertainment are jointly distributed the film.

=== Home media ===
The digital distribution rights of the film were acquired by Amazon Prime Video where it premiered on 17 May 2024.

== Reception ==
The Indian Express rated the film two out of five stars and wrote that "Krishnamma has its moments, but it is nothing we haven’t seen on the Telugu screen. It may appeal to viewers who like rural, small-town emotional dramas". The Times of India rated the film three out of five stars and wrote that "Krishnamma stands out for its strong character dynamics and solid performances. It may tread familiar ground, but it does so with enough competence and emotional depth to make it a worthwhile experience for fans of the genre".

Cinema Express rated the film two-and-a-half out of five stars and wrote that "There are many such moments in Krishnamma, where debutant writer-director VV Gopala Krishna convinces us that his heart is in the right place. Alas, the film falls prey to its predictability and lack of efficient craftsmanship". A critic from Eenadu wrote that "There is no novelty in the story chosen by director Gopalakrishna. Otherwise, the way it is shown in a raw, rustic way is good". Times Now News wrote that "Krishnamma is a revenge drama that doesn't break new ground but it is watchable for its emotional pay-offs only in the second half". Telugucinema.com rated the film two-and-three-quarters out of five and wrote that "Overall, the first half of the doesn’t work much, but the later half holds interest quite well".
