= Happy Birthday (2022 Indian film) =

2022 Indian crime comedy film

- Theatrical release poster
- Directed by: Ritesh Rana
- Written by: Ritesh Rana
- Produced by: Chiranjeevi Pedamallu; Hemalatha Pedamallu
- Starring: Lavanya Tripathi; Naresh Agastya; Vennela Kishore; Satya
- Cinematography: Suresh Sarangam
- Edited by: Karthika Srinivas
- Music by: Kaala Bhairava
- Production companies: Mythri Movie Makers; Clap Entertainment
- Distributed by: Mythri Movie Makers
- Release date: 8 July 2022
- Country: India
- Language: Telugu

Happy Birthday is a 2022 Indian Telugu-language surreal crime comedy film written and directed by Ritesh Rana and produced by Mythri Movie Makers and Clap Entertainment. It stars Lavanya Tripathi in a dual role along with Naresh Agastya, Vennela Kishore, and Satya.

Principal photography of the film took place between November 2021 and May 2022 in Hyderabad. The film has music composed by Kaala Bhairava. Happy Birthday was theatrically released on 8 July 2022 and received mixed reviews from critics and audiences.

== Plot ==
Set in a fantasy world, Union minister Rithwik Sodhi passes a new gun law in the parliament that liberalizes the manufacturing and sale of fire arms, leading to an increased gun culture in the country. A girl's birthday party at a hotel becomes entangled in a criminal and government conspiracy.

== Cast ==
- Lavanya Tripathi in a dual role as Pasupuleti Happy Tripati and Pasupuleti Baby Tripati
- Vennela Kishore as Union minister Rithwik Sodhi
- Naresh Agastya as Lucky
- Satya as Max Pain
- Rahul Ramakrishna as Gunda
- Gundu Sudarshan as Uncle Fixit
- Getup Srinu as William
- Privij as Serena
- Harsha Chemudu as Receptionist
- Vidyullekha Raman as Receptionist QT
- Ravi Teja as Benami
- Rohini as Ratna
- Baaji
- C. V. L. Narasimha Rao
- Rocket Raghava

== Production ==
Following his debut directorial venture Mathu Vadalara (2019), Ritesh Rana was signed for another film under the production of Mythri Movie Makers. Actress Lavanya Tripathi was cast the lead in her first crime comedy film. The film required 300 to 400 guns, and guns were rented from people who source them for film shootings. Tripathi plays a modern girl nicknamed Happy 340.

The film began its production in Hyderabad in November 2021. In December, the film was titled as Happy Birthday. The shoot was completed by May 2022. Kaala Bhairava composed the film's music. The film has cinematography by Suresh Sarangam and editing by Karthika Srinivas.

== Music ==
The music of the film is composed by Kaala Bhairava. Lyrics are written by Kittu Vissapragada. The first single was released on 4 July 2022.

No.	Title	Lyrics	Singer(s)	Length
1.	"Party Song"	Kittu Vissapragada	Damini Bhatla	3:55

== Release ==
Happy Birthday was released theatrically on 8 July 2022, advanced by a week from its initial release date of 15 July 2022.

== Reception ==
Neeshitha Nyayapati of The Times Of India rated the film 3 out of 5 stars and wrote "Despite its flaws, Happy Birthday is refreshing and is exactly what TFI needs to shake things up. It might be far from perfect but Ritesh deserves an A+ for effort". A critic for The Hans India rated the film 2 out of 5 stars and wrote "Happy Birthday is a different attempt in the comedy genre. But, it fails to provide a cohesive narrative from the start to the end. It ends up boring and scratching our heads".
