= Amar Akbar Anthony (2018 film) =

2018 Indian film by Srinu Vaitla

- Theatrical release Poster
- Directed by: Srinu Vaitla
- Screenplay by: Srinu Vaitla
- Story by: Srinu Vaitla; Vamsi Rajesh Kondaveeti
- Produced by: Naveen Yerneni; Yalamanchili Ravi Shankar; Mohan Cherukuri (CVM)
- Starring: Ravi Teja; Ileana D'Cruz; Vikramjeet Virk; Abhimanyu Singh
- Narrated by: Srinu Vaitla
- Cinematography: Venkat Dileep Chunduru
- Edited by: M. R. Varma
- Music by: S. S. Thaman
- Production company: Mythri Movie Makers
- Distributed by: Eros International
- Release date: 16 November 2018
- Running time: 153 minutes
- Country: India
- Language: Telugu

Amar Akbar Anthony is a 2018 Indian Telugu-language action comedy film co-written and directed by Sreenu Vaitla which features Ravi Teja and Ileana D'Cruz playing the lead Alongside Vikramjeet Virk And Abhimanyu Singh. Also marking the fourth collaboration between Teja and Vaitla after Nee Kosam, Venky and Dubai Seenu, the film was produced by Naveen Yerneni, Y. Ravi Shankar and Mohan Cherukuri under their banner Mythri Movie Makers. Pre-production of the film began in June 2017, and the film's principal photography commenced at New York in April 2018. The narrative centers around Amar, a man suffering from multiple personality disorder, who is on a vengeful killing spree but is often hindered by the emergence of two more personalities he is unaware of. This film has no relation to the 1977 film of the same name, Amar Akbar Anthony.

The film, released worldwide on 16 November 2018, was panned by critics and audiences, becoming a box office flop.

== Plot ==
Set in New York, the film revolves around Amar, who, once freed from prison, kills a businessman before extracting from him a "Fido" ring. However, Amar is unaware of the fact that he has multiple personality disorder that causes him to assume two more identities in addition to his own. Each identity has a trigger that results in its emergence. Whenever something breaks, he transforms into Akbar, a muslim man who keeps helping the needy. Whenever he sees someone acting abnormally, he transforms into Mark Anthony, a calm doctor. Whenever something explodes, he becomes Amar himself. While as Akbar, he meets Pooja, a young woman who also has MPD. In a gym, a few men try to flirt with her, and their telling her to "trust them" triggers the alternate personality, which violently beats them up. Pooja is surprised to meet Akbar as Dr. Anthony, who soon starts her therapy.

Meanwhile, FBI officer Balwant Kharge investigates the murder of the first businessman, and being a partner, he keeps informing the remaining three businessmen who might be the next targets. Evidence brings him closer to the realization that Amar might be involved in the murder. Pooja's uncle Jalal Akbar unites with her. Her real name is revealed to be Aishwarya. Over time, Amar realizes that something is wrong with him. He visits the grave of his parents with flowers but is chased by Kharge and his fellow officers. He tries to kill the next target but fails. He hires Bobby, a random stranger, to find out what is wrong with him. He realizes he has MPD, while the flashback is revealed in the words of Jalal Akbar to Aishwarya and Dr. Mark Anthony's words to Kharge. It is revealed that Amar and Aishwarya's families were betrayed by four businessmen whom they trusted and awarded "Fido" rings. The explosion of their house triggered the disorder in Amar, and the menace created by the businessmen triggered it in Aishwarya. The businessmen tried to kill Amar, Aishwarya, and Jalal in a subsequent chase but failed. Aishwarya and Amar were admitted to Dr. Anthony's school, where they got separated by circumstances.

In the present, Amar manages to kill the second businessman by strangling him while also leaving behind clues that alert Kharge. However, this disorder causes Amar to miss Saboo Menon, the target he had earlier failed to kill. He then manipulates the members of WATA, an association for Telugu people, into killing Menon. They are taken in and end up leading Kharge to the truth. Karan Arora, the fourth businessman, calls Amar for a meeting in exchange for Jalal and Aishwarya's freedom. Realizing his loved ones are still alive, Amar arrives for the exchange and, in the presence of Kharge and his assistant, breaks into a fight that leaves the henchmen wounded and Arora dead. He extracts the last Fedo ring and then leaves the scene. Kharge is disappointed to realize he kidnapped someone else instead of Aishwarya. Amar then visits his long-lost house, where he unites with Aishwarya, and Dr. Anthony tells Jalal that their mental condition will now start returning to normal. Kharge decides to testify against Amar but instead covers up for him after being blackmailed by a letter.

== Cast ==
- Ravi Teja as Amar / Akbar / Anthony
  - Chandrahaas as Young Amar
- Ileana D'Cruz as Aishwarya / Pooja / Teresa
  - Sloka as Young Aishwarya
- Vikramjeet Virk as Vikram Talwar
- Abhimanyu Singh as FBI officer Balwant Kharge
- Sunil as Bobby
- Sayaji Shinde as Jalal Akbar
- Tarun Arora as Karan Arora
- Adithya as Saboo Menon
- Ravi Mariya as Raghav Shetty
- Subhalekha Sudhakar as Dr. Marc Anthony
- Abhirami as Amar's mother
- Sijoy Varghese as Young Aishwarya's father
- Laya as Aishwarya's mother (Cameo Appearance).
- Mathew Varghese as Amar's father
- Raghu Babu as Gandikota
- Srinivasa Reddy as Kandulu
- Harsha Chemudu as Trinai
- Vennela Kishore as Miriyala
- Jaya Prakash Reddy as WATA Chairman Pullareddy
- Bharath Reddy as Mareddy, Pullareddy's assistant
- Ravi Prakash as Chidambaram, Balwant's assistant
- Tanikella Bharani as Babu Nath
- Venkata Giridhar as Miriyala's assistant
- Rajveer Ankur Singh as Rajveer
- Satya as Jr. K. A. Paul
- Shakalaka Shankar

== Production ==
=== Development ===
Ravi Teja and Srinu Vaitla who earlier worked in Nee Kosam (1999), Venky (2004) and Dubai Seenu (2007) re-united for this film in June 2017. The title Amar Akbar Anthony was confirmed in November 2017 and Mythri Movie Makers came on board as producers.

Pre-production was started, and the film was launched in March 2018.

=== Casting ===
Anu Emmanuel, who was signed as the female lead, opted out of the project in May 2018 due to date issues. Ileana D'Cruz was signed as the female lead in May 2018, continuing her successful collaboration with Ravi Teja after Kick and Khatarnak, making a comeback to Telugu cinema after last appearance opposite Ravi again in Devudu Chesina Manushulu (2012). Laya was chosen to make a comeback for the film since she was settled in America, where most of the film was set.

=== Filming ===
Principal photography commenced in New York on 1 April 2018. The last major schedule started in August 2018 at New York City.

== Soundtrack ==
Amar Akbar Anthony

Soundtrack album by S. Thaman
- Released: 10 November 2018
- Recorded: 2018
- Genre: Soundtrack
- Length: 17:10
- Label: Lahari Music
- Producer: S. Thaman

S. Thaman chronology
Aravinda Sametha Veera Raghava (2018)	Amar Akbar Anthony (2018)	Kavacham (2018)
External audio
- Audio Jukebox on YouTube

The music was composed by S. Thaman and released on Lahari Music.

Track list
No.	Title	Lyrics	Singer(s)	Length
1.	"Kalala Kadhala"	Ramajogayya Sastry	Harini Ivvaturi	4:41
2.	"Don Bosco"	Viswa	Sri Krishna, Jaspreet Jasz, Hariteja, Manisha Eerabathini, Ramya Behara	4:39
3.	"Khullam Khulla Chilla"	Balaji	Nakash Aziz, Mohana, Ramya Behara	3:34
4.	"Guppeta"	Balaji	Ranjith, Kaala Bhairava, Sri Krishna, Saketh	4:16
Total length:				17:10

== Release ==
Vaitla stated in an interview in June 2018 that the film would be released during Dasara. The worldwide release date was announced as 5 October 2018. But the movie was rescheduled to be released on 16 November 2018.

== Reception ==
Neeshita Nyayapati of The Times of India gave 2.5/5 stars and wrote, "The film just turns out to be old wine in a new bottle made worse by ignorance." Murali Krishna C H of Cinema Express gave 2/5 stars and wrote, "Amar Akbar Anthony has all the ingredients for good commercial cinema, but ends up being a lacklustre film all the same."

Manoj Kumar R of The Indian Express gave 1/5 stars and wrote, "Writer-director Sreenu Vaitla believes he can throw anything at the audience and they will lap it up as long as they see Ravi Teja onscreen." Hemanth Kumar CR of Firstpost wrote, "The funny moments fall flat which leaves the actors to overcompensate with pointless conversations. But the biggest drawback of the film is, perhaps, the weight that Sreenu Vaitla seems to have carried on his shoulders that the film has to be funny and thrilling at the same time. It just doesn’t work most of the time."
