= Sri Simha Koduri =

Indian actor

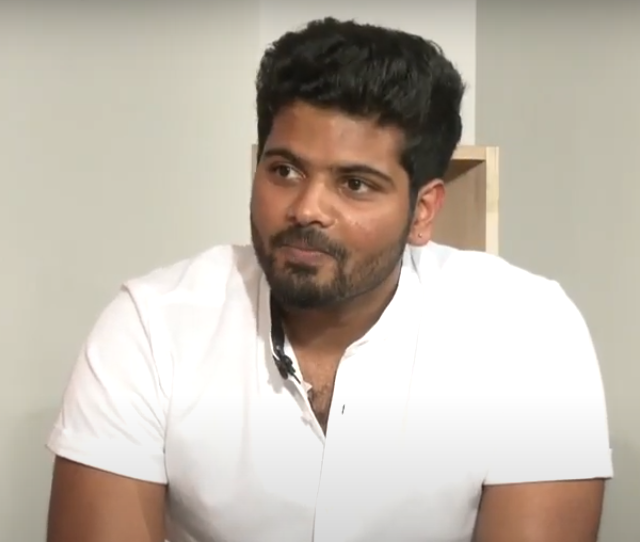
- Koduri in 2019
- Born: Sri Simha Koduri; 23 February 1996 (age 30); Hyderabad, Andhra Pradesh (now in Telangana), India
- Occupation: Actor
- Years active: 2007–present
- Parent(s): M. M. Keeravani (father); M. M. Srivalli (mother)
- Relatives: Kaala Bhairava (brother); S. S. Rajamouli (uncle); Kalyani Malik (uncle)

Sri Simha Koduri (born 23 February 1996) is an Indian actor, who works in Telugu films. He first appeared as a child artist in Yamadonga (2007). After working in various off-screen roles, Simha made his debut as a lead actor in Mathu Vadalara (2019) for which he won SIIMA Award for Best Male Debut – Telugu.

== Early life ==
Sri Simha was born on 23 February 1996 in Hyderabad of present-day Telangana. His father, M. M. Keeravani, is a music director. He is the nephew of director S. S. Rajamouli. His elder brother, Kaala Bhairava, is a singer and music composer in Telugu films. He married Maganti Raga in 2025, the granddaughter of former actor Murali Mohan.

== Career ==
Sri Simha is a regular in S. S. Rajamouli's films. He was a child in Yamadonga (2007), playing the younger version of Jr. NTR's character. He also featured in a promotional song "Follows Follows" along with Jr. NTR. For Baahubali 2: The Conclusion (2017), he worked as an assistant music director, while his elder brother, Kaala Bhairava, was a singer for the film. Bhairava is now a music director in Telugu cinema. Simha worked as an assistant director to Sukumar during the filming of Rangasthalam (2018).

He made his debut in a lead role in Mathu Vadalara (2019). In a review of the film by The Times of India, a critic stated that he "delivers a decent performance" and how "He looks natural in his rugged look and nails scenes which require him to show emotions like fear or anger". Simha won SIIMA Award for Best Male Debut – Telugu for the film. In 2021, he starred in Thellavarithe Guruvaram. The film Bhaag Saale was released in 2023.

== Filmography ==
Key
†	Denotes films that have not yet been released

- All films are in Telugu, unless otherwise noted.

Year	Film	Role	Notes
2007	Yamadonga	Young Raja	Child actor
2010	Maryada Ramanna	Obuleshu	Child actor
2012	Eega	Bindu's colleague	
2017	Baahubali 2: The Conclusion	Kunthala rebel	
2019	Mathu Vadalara	Babu Mohan	Debut as a lead actor Won: SIIMA Award for Best Male Debut – Telugu
2021	Thellavarithe Guruvaram	Veerendra	
2022	Dongalunnaru Jaagratha	Raju	
2023	Bhaag Saale	Arjun	
2023	Ustaad	Surya Sivakumar	
2024	Mathu Vadalara 2	Babu Mohan	
