= Ananya Nagalla =

Indian actress

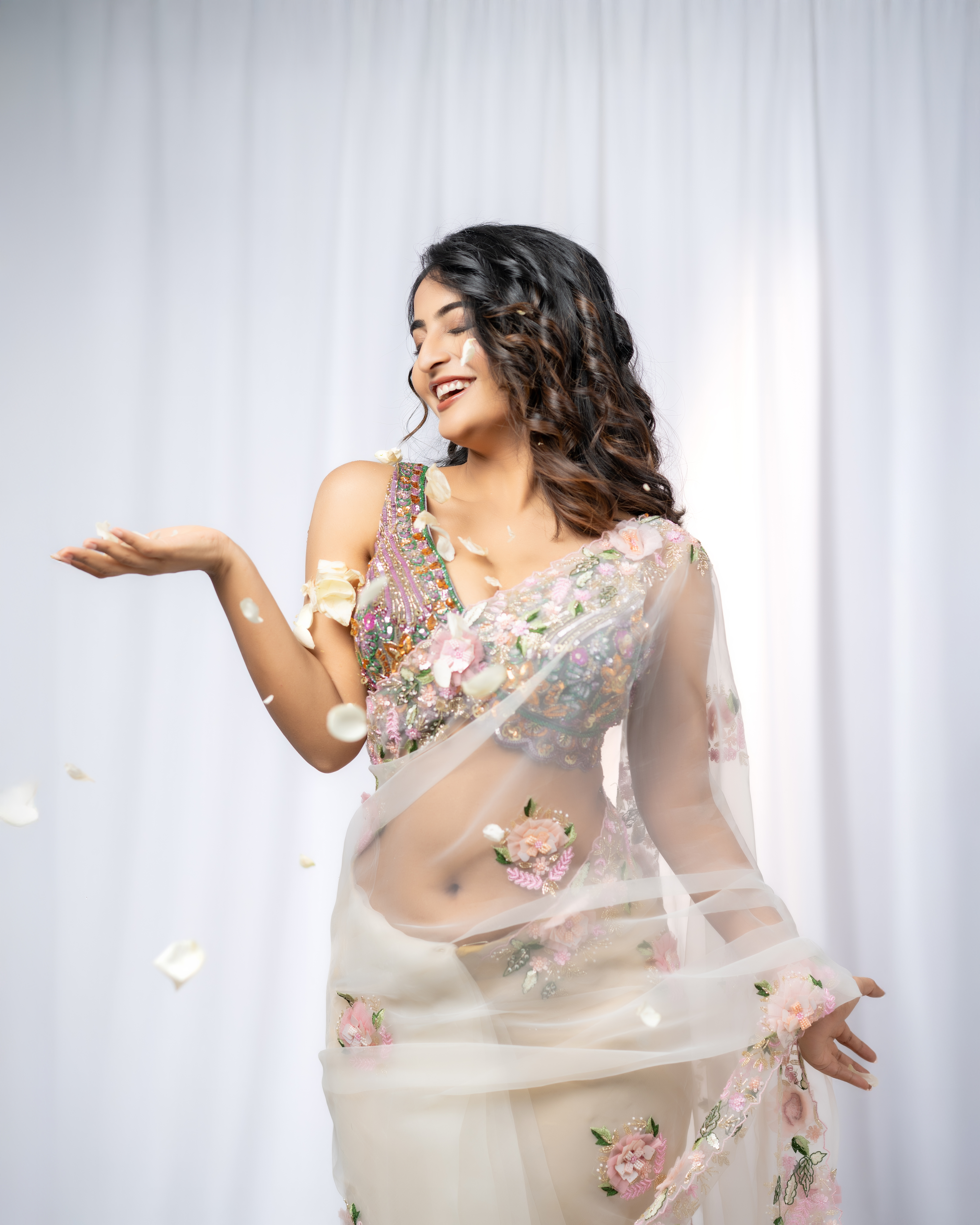
- Ananya Nagalla in a floral saree during a photoshoot, 2025
- Born: Sathupalli, Telangana, India
- Education: Raja Mahendra College of Engineering, Ibrahimpatnam
- Occupation: Actress
- Years active: 2019–present

Ananya Nagalla is an Indian actress who appears in Telugu films. She made her debut with Mallesham (2019) and went onto appear in films such as Play Back (2021) and Vakeel Saab (2021). She won the Telangana Gaddar Film Awards for her performance in the film Pottel (2024).

== Early life ==
Nagalla was born in a Telugu family in Sathupalli of Khammam district in Telangana (then in Andhra Pradesh) to Venkateswara Rao and Vishnu Priya. Her father is a businessman and her family moved to Hyderabad for her studies. She completed her BTech in Raja Mahendra College of Engineering, Ibrahimpatnam and worked in Infosys before pursuing a career in the film industry.

== Career ==
While working, Nagalla appeared in the short film Shaadi and was nominated as Best Actress at the SIIMA Short Film Awards. She was later auditioned and selected for the 2019 biographical Mallesham co-starring Priyadarshi. She was credited with her birth name Anusha Nagalla in the film. Nagalla took a break from her work to prepare for the role. Reviewing the film, The Indian Express critic Murali Krishna CH appreciated her, stating "Ananya Nagalla shines in the role of Mallesham's wife Padma. Her innate innocence seeps into her performance." A reviewer from The News Minute stated: "Ananya is endearing and has been given a lot of scope to emote." The Hindu's Sangeetha Devi Dundoo also echoed the same and wrote: "Ananya brings in the innocence required for her part and makes a promising debut."

In 2021, Nagalla appeared in the sci fi drama film Play Back. A reviewer of Zee Cinemalu felt that Nagalla was the stand out among the actors. "Ananya was decent but none of the other actors could do justice for their characters," they added. In the same year, she also appeared in the Pawan Kalyan-starrer Vakeel Saab, a remake of the Hindi film Pink. Director Venu Sriram cast her in the film following her role in Mallesham. Sangeetha Devi in her review for The Hindu praised her performance, stating: "The women — Nivetha, Anjali and Ananya — are remarkable. Nivetha and Ananya in particular internalise and convey the mixed feelings of courage, fear and despair effectively." A Deccan Chronicle critic wrote: "Nivetha Thomas, Anjali and Ananya have excelled in their parts, justifying each of their presence in the film."

In 2024, Nagalla played the protagonist in Tantra. Speaking about her performance in the film, a reviewer from Times Now wrote, “Ananya Nagalla shines in the lead role, effortlessly portraying [her character]'s journey with her captivating screen presence.”

== Filmography ==
Key
†	Denotes films that have not yet been released

=== Feature films ===
List of Ananya Nagalla films and roles
Year	Title	Role	Notes	Ref.
2019	Mallesham	Padma		
2021	Play Back	Sujatha		
2021	Vakeel Saab	Divya Nayak		
2021	Maestro	Pavithra		
2022	Urvasivo Rakshasivo	Divya	Special appearance	
2023	Shaakuntalam	Anasuya		
2023	Malli Pelli	Young Parvati		
2023	Anveshi	Dr. Anu		
2024	Tantra	Rekha		
2024	Darling	Dr. Nandini		
2024	Pottel	Bujjamma		
2024	Srikakulam Sherlock Holmes	Bhrama		
2026	Lechindi Mahila Lokam	Nirma		

=== Televisions ===
Year	Title	Role	Network	Ref.
2024	Bahishkarana	Lakshmi	ZEE5	

=== Short films ===
Year	Title	Role	Notes	Ref.
2017	Shaadi	Shanti	Debut short film	

== Awards and nominations ==
Year	Award	Category	Film	Result	Ref.
2020	South Indian International Movie Awards	Best Female Debut – Telugu	Mallesham	Nominated	
2025	Gaddar Telangana Film Awards	Special Jury – Best Actress	Pottel	Won	
