= Oka Praanam =

- Cover of the song

Song by Kaala Bhairava

from the album of Baahubali 2: The Conclusion
- Released: 26 March 2017
- Genre: Stage and screen
- Length: 2:56
- Label: Lahari Music
- Songwriter: M.M. Keeravani

Music video
- "Oka Praanam" on YouTube

"Oka Praanam" (transl. One life) is the title Telugu song of the 2017 film Baahubali 2: The Conclusion. Sung by Kaala Bhairava, his father M. M. Keeravani was the lyricist and music composer of the song. The lyrics of the song showcases the problems faced by the characters and the odds they have to overcome. The music video of the track comprises scenes from the 2015 film Baahubali: The Beginning and was intended to be a recap of the first film for the audience and used as opening credits in the film.

== Release ==
The audio of the song was released on 26 March 2017 along with other tracks in the album through the YouTube channel of T-Series Telugu and is also the first song to be played in the movie. The music video of the song was released three weeks after the release of the film. The video of the song has received more than 2 million views on YouTube.

The song was released in Tamil as Oru Yaagam on 9 April 2017, in Hindi as Shivam on 5 April 2017 and in Malayalam as Oru Jeevan Bahuthayagam on 24 April 2017.

== Reception ==
The Indian Express writes, "The title song reminds us of the dramatic highs of S.S. Rajamouli film."

== Accolades ==
Year	Awards	Category	Recipient/Nominee	Result
2017	10th Mirchi Music Awards	Upcoming Male Vocalist of The Year	Kaala Bhairava	Nominated
