= Thellavarithe Guruvaram =

2021 Indian film

- Theatrical Release Poster
- Directed by: Manikanth Gelli
- Written by: Nagendra Pilla
- Produced by: Rajani Korrapati; Ravindra Benerjee Muppaneni (Benny)
- Starring: Sri Simha; Chitra Shukla; Misha Narang
- Cinematography: Suresh Ragutu
- Edited by: Satya Giduturi
- Music by: Kaala Bhairava
- Production companies: Vaaraahi Chalana Chitram; Loukya Entertainments
- Release date: 27 March 2021
- Running time: 126 minutes
- Country: India
- Language: Telugu

Thellavarithe Guruvaram (transl. It's Thursday tomorrow) is a 2021 Indian Telugu-language romantic comedy film written by Nagendra Pilla and directed by Manikanth Gelli and jointly produced by Rajani Korrapati and Ravindra Benerjee Muppaneni (Benny), under Vaaraahi Chalana Chitram and Loukya Entertainments. The film features Sri Simha, Chitra Shukla and Misha Narang in the lead roles. The film was dubbed into Tamil as Vidinjaa Viyazhakizhamai (transl. Dawn will be Thursday).

== Plot ==
Veeru and Madhu, both brought up in traditional families, are arranged to get married. On the eve of their wedding day, Veeru plans to run away from the marriage. While on his way, he sees Madhu running away as well. After trying to get each other to run away so they can blame the other for ending the marriage, they both sit down and tell each other their reasons for running away.

Veeru runs a construction company founded by his father, together with his friends including Balu and Shweta. One night, after being thrashed in a brawl at a bar, he is attended to by Dr Krishna Veni at the hospital. After a few days, he asks her out for dinner, and they start dating. But they frequently have misunderstandings because of Krishna's jealousy and overthinking. One evening, while he meets her family, Veeru misinterprets the situation and inadvertently supports the man her family plans to have her marry. This causes a huge fight between Veeru and Krishna, resulting in her breaking up with him. Meanwhile, for a while, his father has been forcing Veeru to get married as per his wishes. Heartbroken, he finally agrees to the marriage. But on the eve of the wedding, just a couple of hours before he starts narrating his story, Krishna calls him asking him to come to elope with her before her wedding, which is scheduled for the next day as well. And thus, Veeru plans to elope and run away from the wedding.

Meanwhile, Madhu grows up afraid of marriage, afraid of marrying a violent husband who doesn't understand her. While it starts with her mother disciplining her by threatening a bad marriage, movies and tv shows amplify her fear. After rejecting a lot of proposals, she is finally convinced by her cousin to say yes to Veeru. But on the eve of the wedding, just as Veeru plans to run away, her mother unintentionally reinvokes her fear prompting her to run away.

With neither of them convinced to leave without the other, they both leave the marriage venue in a car. They first go to Krishna's place where Krishna tells Veeru she called him in haste and asks him to leave. Frustrated, Veeru leaves and plans to drop Madhu off on a bus to Hyderabad. At the bus stand, Madhu starts to think of her father and how he would be affected by her running away. Regretful, she wants to return and Veeru agrees to drop her back at the venue and leave. On their way back, they hit and kill a goat. Soon, they are attacked by a local tribe. The goat was part of a superstitious ritual, where a tribesman was to marry the goat. With the goat dead, they force Madhu to marry the tribesman instead. Veeru tries to resist and free Madhu, but fails and is thrashed. Fortuitously, the tribe finds the goat alive and releases Veeru and Madhu.

On their way back, after a bit of to and fro, they both end up liking each other and longing to proceed with their marriage but do not convey their feelings. Back at the venue, after dropping Madhu, Veeru is forced by circumstances to reenter. At the venue, they finally convey their feelings towards each other and get married as per the original plan with all their family members in attendance.

== Cast ==
- Sri Simha Koduri as Veerendra "Veeru"
- Chitra Shukla as Dr. Krishnaveni
- Misha Narang as Madhu
- Ravi Varma Adduri as Veeru's father
- Rajeev Kanakala as Madhu's father
- Satya as Veeru's uncle
- Ajay
- Viva Harsha
- Sharanya Pradeep as Vijaya

== Release ==
The film was released on 27 March 2021.

== Reception ==
Hemath Kumar of Firstpost stated that "Despite a runtime of just two hours, Thellavarithe Guruvaram feels too long to sit through and it tests your patience. You neither care about the fate of the couple or how they find love for each other. When the end credits roll, you almost breathe a sigh of relief that the whole ordeal is over. And somewhere in the process, a heartwarming tale of a young couple, finding love in the middle of nowhere, is lost."

Neeshita Nyayapati of The Times of India wrote, "Sri Simha Koduri performs well, refreshingly choosing a character that's not interested in being a "hero". Clearly, the actor isn't interested in being one either, choosing scripts that offer something novel instead of run-of-the-mill. Chitra and Misha also perform well in characters that have a life of their own. The music by Kaala Bhairava is okay, while the BGM ably supports the film. With characters like Veerendra, Madhu and Krishnaveni, the film has scope to be a gripping, light-hearted rom-com. But the director falters when it comes to lending the story some depth, or even at making it engaging. Give this one a chance for the actors, because they are what make the film worthwhile."
