= Anveshi =

2023 Indian Telugu mystery thriller film by V. J. Khanna

- Directed by: VJ Khanna
- Written by: VJ Khanna
- Produced by: T. Ganapathy Reddy
- Starring: Vijay Dharan Datla; Simran Gupta; Ananya Nagalla; Ajay Ghosh
- Cinematography: K. K. Rao
- Edited by: Karthika Srinivas
- Music by: Chaitan Bharadwaj
- Production company: Aruna Sree Entertainments
- Release date: 17 November 2023
- Country: India
- Language: Telugu

Anveshi is a 2023 Indian Telugu-language mystery thriller film written and directed by V. J. Khanna, and produced by T. Ganapathy Reddy under the banner Aruna Sree Entertainments. It stars Vijay Dharan Datla, Simran Gupta, and Ananya Nagalla. The film score was composed by Chaitan Bharadwaj, the cinematography was by K. K. Rao, and the editing was by Karthika Srinivas.

== Plot ==
When Vikram (Vijay Dharan Datla) is searching for a girl who has been missing, he comes across Anu (Simran Gupta) in a bus he falls in love with her at first sight. When he later meets her at the bank he invites her to coffee and proposes to her. Anu tells him that they shall meet again only if he finds out where she lives.

Trying to find Anu, Vikram goes to the village, Maredukona. That village is in the middle of a thick forest. When Vikram reaches the village, whomever he asks for Anu, they reply that Anu has died. This was unexpected for Vikram. When his police friend takes him to the local Sub Inspector's house, there he sees that Anu, whom he loved, is the SI's daughter, and is alive. He feels happy to see her alive. He finds out that the Anu, whom the villagers are talking about, is a deceased doctor who was also named as Anu.

A series of murders take place in the village. As the murders are happening nearby the hospital in which Anu worked and died in a hospital fire, the SI and the local politician (Ajay Ghosh), who is also the private hospital owner, are believing that Anu's ghost has been committing murders, and convincing everyone regarding the same. When a detective who is investigating the series of murders is also killed, it gives strength to the belief that Anu's ghost is committing the murders. How Vikram solves the mystery, and what happened to Vikram – Anu love relationship forms the rest of the story.

== Cast ==
- Vijay Dharan Datla as Vikram
- Simran Gupta as Anu
- Ananya Nagalla as Anu
- Ajay Ghosh as Peddi Reddy
- Emanuel Jabardasth
- Jabardasth Nagireddy
- Vidya Sagar Raju
- Racha Ravi

== Music ==
Anveshi

Soundtrack album by Chaitan Bharadwaj
- Released: 20 March 2023
- Genre: Film soundtrack
- Length: 10:41
- Language: Telugu
- Label: T-Series

Chaitan Bharadwaj chronology
Mama Mascheendra (2023)	Anveshi (2023)	–

The music is composed by Chaitan Bharadwaj.

Track Listing
No.	Title	Lyrics	Singer(s)	Length
1.	"Edho Edho Kalavaram"	Chaitanya Varma	Anurag Kulkarni, Deepthi Parthasarathy	3:16
2.	"Raa Dora"	Chaitanya Prasad	Deepthi Parthasarathy	3:40
3.	"Vennello Godari"	Chaitanya Prasad	Harini Ivaturi	3:45
Total length:				10:41

== Release ==
The movie trailer was released on 16 October 2023. The film was initially slated to release on 10 November 2023. The film was eventually released on 17 November 2023.

== Reception ==
The film received mixed to negative reviews.

Timesnownews gave 3/5 to the film and wrote, "Anveshi emerges as a promising addition to the mystery thriller genre, offering a unique blend of love, horror, and suspense."
