= Gundu Sudarshan =

Telugu comedian

- Born: Surampudi Sudarshan Rao; 3 January 1966 (age 60); Bhimavaram, Andhra Pradesh, India
- Education: REC Allahabad (B.Tech), REC Surathkal, Karnataka (M.Tech), JNTU Hyderabad (PhD)
- Occupations: Actor, comedian
- Years active: 1993 - present
- Spouse: Surampudi Vijayalakshmi

Gundu Sudarshan (born Surampudi Sudarshan Rao) is an Indian comedian and actor who works in Telugu films. He acted in more than 350 films. He also has stage experience from the age of 10. He entered the film industry with Mister Pellam in 1993 directed by Bapu.

== Early life ==
He was born to Subbarao and Kanakalatha and brought up in Bhimavaram, West Godavari district of Andhra Pradesh, India. His father was an advocate. He used to watch mythological dramas from his childhood. Till seventh standard, he studied in Manchili, his grandfather's village. He had stage experience from the age of 10. He started his acting career in his 7th standard in a stage play called Mondi Guruvu Banda Sishyudu, playing the role of Sishya (disciple). He also used to participate in cultural activities in his school. He did his schooling and intermediate in Bhimavaram.

Though he occasionally participated in stage plays, he concentrated more on studies. He completed his B.Tech in Civil Engineering from REC Allahabad, Uttar Pradesh, and earned his M.Tech from REC Surathkal, Karnataka. He holds a PhD in Civil Engineering from Jawaharlal Nehru Technological University, Hyderabad, and also possesses a degree in Psychology. He worked as a lecturer in SRKR Engineering college, Bhimavaram before turning into full-time actor.

== Career ==
He had a good rapport with writer Sriramana who is famous for his novel Mithunam, and through him, was introduced to Bapu. Bapu offered him a role of Pinni Gari Mogudu in a comedy serial Navvite Navvandi. Another Tollywood comedian, AVS, also was introduced to acting with this serial. He played the role of Chandamarkulu, guru of Prahlada in Bhagavatam television serial directed by Bapu and broadcast by ETV.

He made his debut as an actor in the biographic film of a great Telugu poet Srinatha called Srinatha Kavi Sarvabhowmudu (1991), directed by Bapu and starring N. T. Rama Rao. He played the role of Ganapati, the chief cook of Srinatha, in this film. It was a full-length role along with N. T. Rama Rao. But the first film released was Mister Pellam in which he played two roles – Narada and Narasaiah (neighbor of Rajendra Prasad). His dialogue Antha Vishnu Maya became popular with audiences. After that he acted in the films Rambantu, Chitram, Ramasakkanodu. He then had to go back to Bhimavaram to work as a lecturer and support his family. He continued acting in movies whenever Bapu offers him a role in his films. He used to travel to Hyderabad, finish his schedule and come back to his native for doing his regular job.

After five years, he relocated to Hyderabad to pursue a Ph.D. at JNTU. This also gave him an opportunity to focus more on films. His second innings started with the film Chitram (2000) directed by Teja. He also graced the screens of several popular Telugu television shows. Notably, he hosted the mythological show "Chittam Chittam Prayaschittam" as Chitragupta for 40 episodes, even penning its script. He also appeared as a guest on Suma's comedy show "Bhale Chance le" on MAA TV and participated in the celebrity talk show "Nuvvu Nenu" hosted by Udaya Bhanu.

== Personal life ==
He is married to Vijayalakshmi. She did her M.A. in Sociology. They have two children.

== Filmography ==
- Mister Pellam (1993)
- Srinatha Kavi Sarvabhowmudu (1993)
- Madam (1994)
- Rambantu (1995)
- Chitram (2000)
- Tommidi Nelalu (2000)
- Chiru Navvutho (2000)
- Student No.1 (2001)
- Itlu Sravani Subramanyam (2001)
- Chandravamsam (2002)
- Kalusukovalani (2002)
- Vooru Manadiraa (2002)
- Kabaddi Kabaddi (2003)
- Simhadri (2003)
- Ela Cheppanu (2003)
- Aayudham (2003)
- Andhrudu (2004)
- Malleeswari (2004)
- Konchem Touchlo Vunte Cheputanu (2004)
- Athadu (2005)
- Rajababu (2006)
- 10th Class (2006)
- Veerabhadra (2006)
- Kithakithalu (2006)
- Samanyudu (2006)
- Maya Bazar (2006)
- Hope (2006)
- Desamuduru (2007)
- Bhookailas (2007)
- Mr. Medhavi (2008)
- Naa Manasukemaindi (2008)
- Ready (2008)
- Deepavali (2008) as Sudarshan
- Dongala Bandi (2008)
- Nachav Alludu (2009)
- Namo Venkatesa (2010)
- Sadhyam (2010)
- Buridi (2010)
- Khaleja (2010)
- Subapradam (2010)
- Aalasyam Amrutam (2010)
- Yemaindi Ee Vela (2010)
- Anaganaga O Dheerudu (2011)
- Solo (2011)
- Money Money, More Money (2011)
- Prema Kavali (2011)
- Ganga Putrulu (2011)
- Genius (2012)
- Race (2013)
- Bhimavaram Bullodu (2014)
- Naa Rakumarudu (2014)
- Manam (2014)
- Loukyam (2014)
- Chandamama Kathalu (2014)
- Yevade Subramanyam (2015)
- Red Alert (2015)
- Soukhyam (2015)
- Soggade Chinni Nayana (2016)
- Supreme (2016)
- Eedo Rakam Aado Rakam (2016)
- Dictator (2016)
- Guntur Talkies (2016)
- Manalo Okkadu (2016)
- Om Namo Venkatesaya (2017)
- Samanthakamani (2017)
- Vaisakham (2017)
- C/O Surya (2017)
- Crazy Crazy Feeling (2019)
- Gaddalakonda Ganesh (2019)
- 90ML (2019)
- Mathu Vadalara (2019)
- F3 (2022)
- Happy Birthday (2022)
- Abhilasha (2023)
- Jilebi (2023)
- Inti No. 13 (2024)
- Paarijatha Parvam (2024)
- Mr. Bachchan (2024)
- Shivam Bhaje (2024)
- Mathu Vadalara 2 (2024)
- Kali (2024)
- Viswam (2024)
- Dhoom Dhaam (2024)
- Katha Kamamishu (2025)
- Mrithyunjay (2026)
- Ustaad Bhagat Singh (2026)
- Jetlee (2026)

Television

- Lady Detective (1995)
