= Tantra (film) =

2024 Indian film by Srinivas Gopisetti

- Theatrical release poster
- Directed by: Srinivas Gopisetti
- Written by: Srinivas Gopisetti
- Produced by: Naresh Babu P; Ravi Chaitanya
- Starring: Ananya Nagalla; Dhanush Raghumudri; Saloni Aswani
- Cinematography: Sai Ram Uday; Vijay Bhaskar Saddala
- Edited by: S. B. Uddhav
- Music by: RR Dhruvan
- Production companies: First Copy Movies; Be The Way Films; Vizag Film Factory
- Release date: 15 March 2024
- Running time: 134 minutes
- Country: India
- Language: Telugu

Tantra is a 2024 Indian Telugu-language horror thriller film written and directed by Srinivas Gopisetti. The film features Ananya Nagalla, Dhanush Raghumudri and Saloni Aswani in lead roles. Tantra was released on 15 March 2024.

== Plot ==
An old man sees a young girl eating a crow inside a forest. Rekha sees the young girl in her house's bathroom but Rekha's grandmother is unable to see the young girl. Rekha, Sailu, Teju / Teja and Sailu's younger brother, Vasu study in the same college. Teju and Rekha are lovers. It is revealed that Rekha could see ghosts. Vasu and Teju meet Sankar who explains about tantric. Rekha, possessed by a ghost, wanders at night but Rekha's father, Kumar, Rekha's grandmother and Rekha's friends believe that Rekha is sleep walking. Rekha visits a priest every Friday. A ghost asks Rekha for blood and possessed Rekha cuts her leg with a knife to offer blood. Teju and Sankar talk about Sankar's past experiences with tantric.

Rekha feels Sailaja / Sailu is possessed by a ghost. As per the priest's instructions, Rekha confirms that someone has used Tantric on Sailu. Rekha and Teju explain to Sailu's family about the Tantric and the way to save Sailu but Sailu's elder brother doesn't believe in Tantric. Sailu's elder brother believes everything after Sailu goes to the graveyard on 12th day under the influence of Tantric as predicted by the priest. Teju explains everything to Sankar. On the 16th day, Sailu becomes normal after Teju kills the man who used Tantric on Sailu.

Possessed Rekha continues to offer blood to a ghost. A mysterious man inquires about Rajeshwari, Rekha's mother. The mysterious man wants to kill Rekha after killing a woman who told about Rekha. The mysterious man uses Tantric on Rekha and the priest performs a pooja to disrupt the tantric. A ghost kills the priest inside a forest. Rekha informs about Vikathi, the mysterious man to Teju. Sankar asks Teju to meet Sandi Swamy and explains about Sankar's past experiences with tantric. Sandi Swamy performs a pooja to disrupt Vikathi's tantric. Teju finds out that the priest never helped to save Sailu. Teju confronts Vikathi and understands Vikathi was not involved in the priest's death. Sandi Swamy explains to Teju that someone else is using Tantric to help Rekha. Sankar sees Possessed Rekha performing Tantric. Rekha tells about Rajeshwari to Teju.

In a flashback, Kumar marries Rajeshwari but doesn't consummate the marriage. Vikathi befriends Kumar and suggests killing Rajeshwari using Tantric. Kumar helps Vikathi to weaken Rajeshwari. Vikathi uses Tantric to sacrifice Rajeshwari to become more powerful but Vikathi's plan backfires when Vikathi loses focus. Vikathi loses sanity and Rajeshwari gets pregnant. Rajeshwari dies after giving birth to Rekha.

Rekha can see ghosts as Rekha was born as a result of a Tantric ritual. Rekha tells Teju that Rekha doesn't fear ghosts and Rekha actually found the way to save Sailu. Rekha explains to Teju that the priest misbehaved with Rekha and so Rekha killed the priest using Tantric and a Ghost. Rekha performs Tantric as a protection from Vikathi and Rajeshwari's spirit guides Rekha. It is revealed that Rekha drinks blood on every full moon night to stabilize her Tantric powers and Rekha was responsible for Teju's mother's death.

Teju finds out that Sankar is giving Tantric equipment to Rekha and Sankar was in love with Rajeshwari. Vikathi turns the villagers against Rekha, ties Rekha to a tree and prepares to sacrifice Rekha to become more powerful. Teju tries to save Rekha but Vikathi attacks Teju. Teju gives his blood to Rekha and Rekha frees herself from her bonds. Vikathi attacks Teju and Rekha agrees to sacrifice herself to save Teju. Sankar and Sandi Swamy perform pooja separately to help Rekha. With Rajeshwari's spirit's help, Teju attacks Vikathi disrupting the Tantric ritual. Rekha uses Tantric to sacrifice Vikathi. Sandi Swamy advises Rekha to use her Tantric powers for good.

== Cast ==
- Ananya Nagalla as Rekha
- Dhanush Raghumudri as Teju
- Saloni Aswani as Rajeshwari
- Temper Vamsi
- Meesala Lakshman
- Manoj Muthyam
- Kushalini as Sailu
- Bhaskar Manyam

== Music ==
Tantra

Soundtrack album by RR Dhruvan
- Released: 2024
- Recorded: 2024
- Language: Telugu
- Label: Nivriti Vibes
- Producer: RR Dhruvan

The film's soundtrack album and background score were composed by RR Dhruvan.

All music is composed by RR Dhruvan.

Track list
No.	Title	Lyrics	Singer(s)	Length
1.	"Dheere Dheere"	Alaraju	Anurag Kulkarni, Aditi Bhavaraju	4:00
2.	"Gayatri Mantram"	Alaraju	ML Gayatri, Pavani Vasa, Sony Komanduri, Lipsika, RR Dhruvan, ML Sruti	2:11
3.	"Arari Raaro"	Raghuram	Aditi Bhavaraju	2:54
4.	"Vandhanam"	Alaraju	Aditi Bhavaraju, Lipsika, RR Dhruvan	3:30

== Release ==
Tantra was released on 15 March 2024. Post-theatrical digital streaming rights were acquired by Aha and was premiered on 5 April 2024.

== Reception ==
Times Now gave a rating of 3 out of 5, and praised the performance of Ananya Nagalla and the storyline. Cinema Express too gave a similar review citing it as a "tiresome, convoluted horror-thriller".
