= Mathu Vadalara 2 =

2024 Indian Telugu-language film by Ritesh Rana

- Theatrical release poster
- Directed by: Ritesh Rana
- Written by: Ritesh Rana
- Produced by: Chiranjeevi (Cherry) Pedamallu; Hemalatha Pedamallu
- Starring: Sri Simha Koduri; Satya; Faria Abdullah; Sunil; Vennela Kishore; Ajay; Rohini
- Cinematography: Suresh Sarangam
- Edited by: Karthika Srinivas
- Music by: Kaala Bhairava
- Production companies: Clap Entertainment; Mythri Movie Makers
- Release date: 13 September 2024
- Running time: 139 minutes
- Country: India
- Language: Telugu
- Budget: ₹10 crore

Mathu Vadalara 2 (transl. Leave the intoxication 2) is a 2024 Indian Telugu-language comedy thriller film directed by Ritesh Rana. It serves as a sequel to Mathu Vadalara (2019). The film features Sri Simha Koduri, Satya, and Vennela Kishore reprising their roles from the first installment, with Faria Abdullah and Sunil joining the cast.

The film is produced by Clap Entertainment and Mythri Movie Makers, with music composed by Kaala Bhairava. Mathu Vadalara 2 was released on 13 September 2024 and became a blockbuster hit. It performed well both domestically and internationally, grossing over $1 million in the US and earned accolades for its fresh storytelling and wit.

== Plot ==
Tejaswi Thota, a voyeur and blackmailer, evades police after years of secretly recording women and extorting them. He disappears, believed to be operating under a new identity. Meanwhile, jobless friends Babu and Yesu join a police task force (Note: following the events of Mathu Vadalara (2019).) the H.E. (High Emergency) Team, through bribery, gaining some recognition but secretly skimming ransom money.

During a night out, Babu and Yesu encounter Akash, whom they suspect is Tejaswi, but lack evidence. The next day, they take on a ransom case for Damini, a wealthy magistrate, whose daughter, Riya, has allegedly been kidnapped. They plan to pocket the ransom, but the kidnapper escapes with the money and Riya remains missing. Damini threatens to report them if they fail to rescue her daughter within a day. Later, they receive another ransom demand for Riya, leading them to confront Akash at a lodge, where he is mysteriously shot by an unknown assailant. Babu and Yesu evade suspicion by manipulating the crime scene.

The following day, they realize they were deceived by a fake Damini, and the real Damini reports her daughter missing. Soon, H.E. Team receives a video implicating Babu and Yesu in Akash's murder. They attempt to flee but find Riya's corpse in their car. As they investigate, they learn that a stuntman, Ranjith, staged the kidnapping scene under Akash's orders. Their colleague, Nidhi, believes in their innocence and helps them uncover clues, linking the case to hidden cameras and a bracelet belonging to Yuva, a famous actor.

When they confront Yuva, he admits to accidentally killing Riya, who was under the influence of a new drug 'Slave' provided by Akash, who used his club to exploit women. Akash had orchestrated the kidnapping to frame Babu and Yesu, but the plan failed when they entered the wrong room. Yuva reveals that Akash was indeed Tejaswi, running a blackmail operation against his club's patrons.

Suspecting further betrayal, Yesu notices a missing bullet from his gun, suspecting tampering by a colleague. Reviewing security footage, they discover that Saxena, a fellow H.E. Team member, shot Akash. Saxena is killed in a subsequent standoff, but Babu deduces that team leader Deepa is the mastermind. Deepa confesses, revealing she sought revenge on Akash, who killed her husband during a failed arrest and exploited her daughter, blackmailing her. With this confession, Babu and Yesu are cleared.

In the post-credits scenes, Yuva confesses and takes the fall for all the events that have happened under the influence of Slave, and a mysterious figure puts Babu and Yesu to sleep, revealing himself to be Abhi.

== Cast ==
- Sri Simha Koduri as Babu Mohan "Babu"
- Satya as Yesu Dasu "Yesu"
- Faria Abdullah as Nidhi
- Sunil as Michael
- Vennela Kishore as "Youth Star" Yuva / Ravi Teja
- Ajay as Akash/Tejaswi Thota.
  - During the beginning scenes of the movie, this character is retconned to exist within the continuity of the films Kushi and Nuvvostanante Nenoddantana (2005), both of which had Ajay play a brief role as a blackmailer. This sets up the possibility of the 3 films existing in a shared universe.
- Rohini as Deepa, Head of the High Emergency Team (H.E. Team)
- Raja Chembolu as Saxena
- Jhansi as the fake Damini
- Srinivasa Reddy as Shivamani
- Gundu Sudarshan
- Satya Krishnan as the real Damini
- Jeevan Kumar Naidu as Ranjith
- Mathew Varghese as Vikram, Deepa's husband
- Rohini Reddy Noni as Rathna
- Suresh Krishna
- Sam
- Bhanu Prakash
- Isha Yadav as Riya, Damini's daughter
- Srinivas Ramireddy
- Pranay Raguthu
- Nagesh Chittiboyina
- Sindhu Reddie
- Naresh Agastya as Abhi (Cameo)
- Athulya Chandra as Myrah (Cameo)

== Production ==
Following the success of Mathu Vadalara in 2019, a sequel was highly anticipated. Ritesh Rana returned to helm the sequel. The production of the film was handled by Clap Entertainment in collaboration with Mythri Movie Makers, with Chiranjeevi 'Cherry' Pedamallu and Hemalatha Pedamallu as producers.

== Music ==
Kaala Bhairava, who composed the music for the first film, returned to score the soundtrack for Mathu Vadalara 2.

Track listing
No.	Title	Lyrics	Singer(s)	Length
1.	"Toxic Male"	Sai Somayajulu	Aditya Iyengar	3:13
2.	"Moron bring it on"	Sai Somayajulu	Aditya Iyengar	3:16
3.	"Mathu Vadalara Trance"	—	Instrumental	3:00
4.	"Drama Nakko Mama"	Faria Abdullah	Faria Abdullah	3:57
Total length:				13:26

== Release ==
Mathu Vadalara 2 was released in theaters on 13 September 2024. The film premiered on Netflix on 11 October 2024.

== Reception ==
Jeevi of Idlebrain rated the film three out of five stars and wrote that "Mathu Vadalara 2 is a logical continuation of the first part. The film's strengths include a hilarious first half, Satya's outstanding performance, Kaala Bhairava’s background music, and Ritesh Rana’s creative writing. Overall, Mathu Vadalara 2 is a solid sequel and delivers wacky entertainment."

Paul Nicodemus of The Times of India rated the film three out of five stars and wrote that "The film's brisk pace in the first half keeps viewers hooked, with a solid interval twist raising the stakes. However, the second half shifts gears into more of a crime thriller, losing some of the energy from the earlier segments." Avad Mohammad of OTTplay gave it three out of five stars and wrote that "Mathu Vadalara 2 is a decent comedy caper that has situational comedy at its best. While the narrative gets jaded a bit in the latter part, Satya's hilarious performance makes the film a watchable fare for its clean entertainment."

Balakrishna Ganeshan of The News Minute gave it two-and-a-half out of five stars and wrote, "While Mathu Vadalara 2's absurd setting works, better writing would have made this film memorable, like its predecessor." Sashidhar Adivi of Times Now gave it two-and-a-half out of five stars and opined that "Mathu Vadalara 2 is a mixed bag. The first half is well-written and well-performed. The second half, however, should have been pacier and neater. All in all, it’s s decent crime thriller."

Aditya Devulapally of Cinema Express wrote that "The murder mystery is the weakest aspect of the film. The revelations are neither shocking, nor does it provide a deeper sense of purpose. However, the actors' comedic quality more than makes up for the lack of clever crime writing." Nirupama Kodukula of Telangana Today wrote that "Overall, this movie moves along nicely, and it closes with a scene that suggests what comes next. The comedy woven throughout the crime tale elevates the film as a whole, despite its foundation in crime. For all those who enjoy comedy films and enjoyment, this is a must-watch."

Sangeetha Devi Dundoo of The Hindu wrote, "Mathu Vadalara 2 is Satya's show all the way, with able support coming in from Simha Koduri, Faria Abdullah, Vennela Kishore, Ajay, Sunil and Raja Chembolu."
