= Mrithyunjay =

- Theatrical release poster
- Directed by: Sri Hussain Sha Kiran
- Written by: Sri Hussain Sha Kiran
- Produced by: Sandeep Gunnam; Vinay Chilakapati
- Starring: Sree Vishnu; Reba Monica John
- Cinematography: Vidya Sagar Chinta
- Edited by: A. Sreekar Prasad
- Music by: Kaala Bhairava
- Production companies: Lightbox Media; Picture Perfect Entertainment
- Release date: 6 March 2026
- Country: India
- Language: Telugu
- Box office: ₹9.30 crore

Mrithyunjay is a 2026 Indian Telugu-language crime thriller film directed by Sri Hussain Sha Kiran and starring Sree Vishnu and Reba Monica John.

It received mixed reviews and emerged as a commercial failure at the box office, grossing over only ₹9.30 crore worldwide.

== Plot ==
Jay is a happy-go-lucky journalist who works to get obituary ads but dreams of becoming a crime investigative journalist one day. He stumbles across a death of a person, Achyuth Sharma and he promises his daughter Anjali that he will solve her father’s murder as he sympathizes with her. On the other hand, ACP Seetha is on a case of solving murders happening in the city but is pressurized by the police commissioner to close the cases as accidents. How Jay and Seetha come together to solve the cases and catch the notorious but extremely intelligent contract killer Saadhu forms the rest of the story.

== Cast ==
- Sree Vishnu as Mrithyunjay "Jay"
- Veer Aaryan as Saadhu, intelligent contract killer
- Baby Uha as Anjali Sarma
- Reba Monica John as ACP Seetha Parasuram IPS
- Sudharshan as Anji, Jay’s friend
- Racha Ravi as Compounder Satthi, Jay’s friend
- Ayyappa P. Sharma as Jay’s friend
- Chatrapathi Sekhar as Basheer, Contract Handler
- Shiju AR as Police Commissioner
- Chinna as Seetha’s assistant
- Aishwariyaa Bhaskaran as Jay's aunt
- Harsha Vardhan as Jay’s boss
- Anish Kuruvilla as Saadhu’s target
- Baladitya as Achyuth Sarma, Anjali’s father, Saadhu's target
- Krishna Koushik as Achyuth’s brother-in-law
- Nandha Gopal as Contract Killer
- Gundu Sudarshan as Postmortem Doctor
- Mirchi Madhavi

== Soundtrack ==
All music is composed by Kaala Bhairava.

Track listing
No.	Title	Lyrics	Singer(s)	Length
1.	"Ee Zindagi"	AbhinavaKavi, Krishna Kanth	Aditya Iyengar, AbhinavaKavi	3:29
2.	"Kanneere Raadha"	Krishna Kanth	Sweekar Agasthi, Sahithi Chaganti, Aishwarya Daruri	2:55
Total length:				5:24

== Release and reception ==
The film was released on 6 March 2026 to mixed reviews.

Sanjana Pulugurtha of The Times of India rated the film three out of five stars and wrote, "The film works as a solid investigative thriller that relies on curiosity and character rather than high-octane twists. While a tighter pace could have elevated the film further, the engaging premise and Sree Vishnu’s composed performance keep the mystery watchable till the end". Sangeetha Devi Dundoo of The Hindu wrote, "Designed as an investigative thriller, it builds intrigue in parts. A few smart stretches, however, are undercut by convenient writing choices that keep the film from becoming fully engaging". Sruthi Ganapathy Raman of The Hollywood Reporter India wrote, "For a film that places so much importance on the surgical precision of its crimes, the execution could have used a lot more of it". Yashaswini Sri of The Indian Express rated the film 3.5/5 stars and wrote, "Worth a watch for the performances and the atmosphere. Just do not go in expecting the ending to match the journey". BVS Prakash of the Deccan Chronicle wrote, "A crime thriller demands razor-sharp writing and gripping narration throughout — and that is precisely where it bites the dust".
