= Bhaag Saale =

2023 film directed by Praneeth Sai

- Directed by: Praneeth Bramandapally
- Written by: Praneeth Bramandapally
- Produced by: Arjun Dasyan; Yash Rangineni; Singanamala Kalyan
- Starring: Sri Simha Koduri; Neha Solanki; John Vijay; Rajeev Kanakala
- Cinematography: Kushendar Ramesh Reddy
- Edited by: Karthika Srinivas
- Music by: Kaala Bhairava
- Production companies: Vedaansh Creative Works; Big Ben Cinemas; Cine Valley Movies
- Release date: 7 July 2023
- Country: India
- Language: Telugu

Bhaag Saale is a 2023 Indian Telugu-language crime comedy film directed by Praneeth Bramandapally. It is produced by Vedaansh Creative Works, in association with Big Ben Cinemas and Cine Valley Movies. It stars Sri Simha Koduri, Neha Solanki, Rajeev Kanakala, Nandini Rai, and Harsha Chemudu.

The title and first look of the film were released on 7 October 2021. The film has music composed by Kaala Bhairava. It was released theatrically on 7 July 2023.

== Premise ==
The film revolves around the a young man who will go to any extent in order to be successful in life.

== Cast ==
- Sri Simha Koduri as Arjun
- Neha Solanki as Maya
- Nandini Rai as Nalini
- Rajeev Kanakala as Royal Murthy, Arjun's father
- John Vijay as Samuel
- Satya as 'Promise' Reddy
- Sudharshan as Kittu, Arjun's friend
- Varshini Sounderajan as Ramya
- Harsha Chemudu as Jackson "Jackie"

== Production ==
=== Development ===
The title and first look of the film were announced on 7 October 2022 and has reportedly wrapped up the shoot and is in the final stage of post production.

=== Cast and crew ===
Sri Simha and Neha Solanki play the lead roles and John Vijay Rajeev Kanakala and Nandini Rai are few among the supporting cast. Kaala Bhairava, the music director of the film is a sibling of Sri Simha and son of Indian music director M. M. Keeravani.

== Music ==
The music rights of the film is owned by Aditya Music. Kaala Bhairava composed the music and background score for the film.

Bhaag Saale

Soundtrack album by Kaala Bhairava
- Released: 2023
- Recorded: 2023
- Genre: Feature film soundtrack
- Length: 17:12
- Language: Telugu
- Label: Aditya Music

Kaala Bhairava chronology
Mukhachitram (2022)	Bhaag Saale (2023)	Krishnamma (2024)

Track listing
No.	Title	Lyrics	Singer(s)	Length
1.	"Kootha Ramp"	Krishna Kanth	Kaala Bhairava	4:07
2.	"Thera Padadhemo"	Maschendra	Kaala Bhairava	3:07
3.	"Prema Kosam"	Kasarla Shyam	Mangli	3:29
4.	"Hrudayam Odipoyelaa"	Sri Valli	Sai Sindhuja	3:16
5.	"The Vibe Of Bhaag Saale"	Pranav Chaganty	Pranav Chaganty	3:13
Total length:				17:12

== Critical reception ==
A critic from Telugucinema.com rated the film 2.5/5 and wrote, "The crime comedy thriller “Bhaag Saale” is entertaining and funny to some part. However, the film's weak writing and predictable twists are also a problem." Avad Mohammad of OTTPlay gave it 2/5 stars and wrote, "On the whole, Bhaag Saale is a crime comedy that works only in bits and pieces. The comedy showcased evokes a few laughs but the lack of twists and basic seriousness in the narration takes the film down making it look silly and over the top." Neeshita Nyayapati of The Times of India gave it 1.5/5 stars and wrote, "Despite the plethora of comedians, the ‘comedy’ isn't as funny as the director seems to think it is [...] At the end of it all, Bhaag Saale would’ve worked had it been entertaining. But this one fails to do that."

Balakrishna Ganeshan of The News Minute wrote, "Director Praneeth heavily relies on slurs and sexual innuendos to create humour, but all it does is make you wince at the obscenity and tastelessness of the writing." Sangeetha Devi Dundoo of The Hindu wrote, "With some deft writing, ‘Bhaag Saale’ could have been a madcap crime comedy but squanders its potential by a mile".
