= Gana (film) =

2025 Indian science fiction thriller film

- Theatrical release poster
- Directed by: Hari Prasad Jakka
- Written by: Hari Prasad Jakka
- Based on: Play Back (Telugu)(2021) by Hari Prasad Jakka
- Produced by: Parthu
- Starring: Prajwal Devaraj; Vedhika Kumar; Yasha Shivakumar
- Cinematography: Jai Anand
- Edited by: Harish Komme
- Music by: J. Anoop Seelin
- Production company: Cherry Creations
- Release date: 31 January 2025
- Running time: 141 minutes
- Country: India
- Language: Kannada

Gana is a 2025 Indian Kannada-language science fictional thriller film written and directed by Hari Prasad Jakka. The film stars Prajwal Devaraj, Vedhika Kumar, and Yasha Shivakumar, alongside Krishi Thapanda, Shivraj K. R. Pete, Sampath Raj, Vishal Hegde, and Ravi Kale in supporting roles. It is a remake of Hari Prasad's 2021 Telugu film Play Back.

== Plot ==
Gana (Prajwal Devaraj), an investigative journalist, moves into an old house in Indira Colony with his friend. While settling in, he discovers an antique landline phone that unexpectedly rings. The caller is Sujatha (Vedhika Kumar), a woman trying to reach someone else. Initially dismissing it as a wrong number, Gana soon realizes that Sujatha's landline connects only to his phone, and their conversations become frequent. As their bond grows, Sujatha seeks Gana's help with a passport issue, and they plan to meet at the passport office. Despite arriving at the same location, they fail to meet—because they are in different time periods: Gana lives in 2022 while Sujatha lives in 1993.

Parallel to this, Gana investigates a murder case that seems inexplicably linked to Sujatha's timeline. As he digs deeper, he realizes that altering events in the past could change the present. With Sujatha's help, Gana attempts to prevent the murder. The climax revolves around whether Gana succeeds in changing the past and what ripple effects follow.

== Cast ==
- Prajwal Devaraj as Gana
- Vedhika Kumar as Sujatha
- Yasha Shivakumar
- Krishi Thapanda
- Shivraj K. R. Pete
- Sampath Raj
- Vishal Hegde
- Ravi Kale

== Production ==
In July 2021, it was reported that Prajwal Devaraj would play the lead of a science fiction film and the untitled project was about to be helmed by Hari Prasad Jakka in his Kannada debut. The production of Gana was launched with a muhurat puja in Bangalore on 24 December 2021. In January 2022, it was announced that Vedhika Kumar would play the female lead and filming was expected to begin in the first week of February. On 31 January 2022, Yasha Shivakumar was announced to play the female lead opposite Prajwal Devaraj. The filming took place in Bangalore and Mysore for over seventy-five days.

== Soundtrack ==
Gana

Soundtrack album by J. Anoop Seelin
- Released: 2025
- Genre: Feature film soundtrack
- Length: 13:18
- Language: Kannada
- Label: Saregama

J. Anoop Seelin chronology
Kaalapatthar (2024)	Gana (2025)
External audio
- Gana – Jukebox on YouTube

The soundtrack was composed by J. Anoop Seelin.

Track listing
No.	Title	Lyrics	Singer(s)	Length
1.	"She is in Love"	Pramod Maravanthe	Vijay Prakash	4:29
2.	"Sona Baby"	V. Nagendra Prasad	Aishwarya Rangarajan	3:50
3.	"Tampaada Tangaali"	Karibasava Tadakal	Meghana Kulkarni	1:45
4.	"North East"	V. Nagendra Prasad	Vyasraj Sosale	3:14
Total length:				13:18

== Release ==
Gana was released theatrically on 31 January 2025.

== Reception ==
Jagadish Angadi of Deccan Herald rated the film three out of five stars and wrote, "The filmmaker deserves credit for a gripping story and a racy screenplay, but the execution falls short, holding it back from reaching its full potential." Sridevi S. of The Times of India gave it two-and-a-half out of five stars and wrote, "Gana ends up being an average commercial film that has borrowed ideas from here and there. The drama unfolds only in the second half, with the film having some entertaining moments. But it struggles to come together as a whole."

A. Sharadhaa of The New Indian Express gave it two-and-a-half out of five stars and wrote, "Despite the intriguing setup, the film lacks the darker, more atmospheric elements that often accompany this kind of narrative. The result is a plot that feels familiar and doesn’t pack the punch one might expect from a sci-fi thriller." Shashiprasad SM of Times Now gave it two-and-a-half out of five stars and wrote, "If you love watching sci-fi films that explore time travel and cross-connections, then Gana is a decent watch. However, it offers nothing new or exciting to make it stand out."

Y. Maheswara Reddy of Bangalore Mirror gave it two-and-a-half out of five stars and wrote, "Gana is the remake of Telugu movie Play Back directed by the same director – Hariprasad Jakka. The director has selected a good subject, but should have focused more on the narration."
