= Karthika Srinivas =

Indian film editor

- Born: Karthika Srinivas; Machilipatnam, Andhra Pradesh, India
- Occupation: Film editor
- Years active: 2011–present

Karthika Srinivas R is an Indian film editor who predominantly works in Telugu films. He is best known for his works in the films Swamy Ra Ra (2013), 1: Nenokkadine (2014), Karthikeya (2014), Antariksham 9000 KMPH (2018) and Mathu Vadalara (2019).

== Career ==
Karthika Srinivas started his career as an editor in the film 100% Love (2011) which earned him recognition. Later his works in critically acclaimed films like 1: Nenokkadine (2014), Karthikeya (2014) and Antariksham 9000 KMPH (2018).

He also worked in short films Be Humane, LIFE’ A true blessing, Machan Enaku Iniki Kalyanam, Kadhile Kaalam Kalala and Middle Finger.

== Filmography ==
Year	Title	Notes
2011	100% Love	
2013	Nadodi Mannan	Malayalam Film
2013	Swamy Ra Ra	
2013	Bhai	
2014	1: Nenokkadine	
2014	Dil Deewana	
2014	Karthikeya	
2014	Rowdy Fellow	
2014	Chakkiligintha	
2015	A Shyam Gopal Varma Film	
2015	Dohchay	
2015	Mosagallaku Mosagadu	
2015	Cinema Choopistha Mava	
2016	Seethamma Andalu Ramayya Sitralu	
2016	Garam	
2016	Thikka	
2016	Avasaraniko Abaddam	
2016	Nandini Nursing Home	
2016	Naruda Donoruda	
2017	Gunturodu	
2017	Kathalo Rajakumari	
2017	Maya Mall	
2017	Okkadu Migiladu	
2018	Vijetha	
2018	Hello Guru Prema Kosame	
2018	Subrahmanyapuram	
2018	Antariksham 9000 KMPH	
2019	Kobbari Matta	
2019	Ekta	
2019	Mathu Vadalara	
2020	Rory	
2021	Rechchi Podham Brother	
2021	30 Rojullo Preminchadam Ela	
2021	Pushpa: The Rise	
2022	Athidi Devo Bhava	
2022	Happy Birthday	
2022	Rajahmundry Rose Milk	
2022	Urvasivo Rakshasivo	
2022	Raajahyogam	
2023	Chitham Maharani	
2023	Popcorn	
2023	Meter	
2023	Bhaag Saale	
2023	Rangabali	Acting debut also
2023	Anveshi	
2023	Kota Bommali PS	
2024	Prasanna Vadanam	
2024	Gam Gam Ganesha	
2024	Double iSmart	
2024	Saripodhaa Sanivaaram	
2024	Mathu Vadalara 2	
2024	Pottel	
2024	Matka	
2025	Court	
2025	HIT: The Third Case	
2025	Shashtipoorthi	
2025	Kuberaa	Bilingual film
2025	Krishna Leela	
2025	Gurram Paapi Reddy	
2026	Ustaad Bhagat Singh	
2026	Jetlee	
2026	KJQ: King Jackie Queen	
2026	Ranabaali	
