= Play Back =

- Theatrical release poster
- Directed by: Jakka Hari Prasad
- Written by: Jakka Hari Prasad
- Produced by: Prasad Rao Peddineni
- Starring: Dinesh Tej; Ananya Nagalla; Arjun Kalyan; Spandana
- Cinematography: K. Bujji
- Edited by: Bonthala Nageswara Reddy
- Music by: Kamran
- Production company: Sri Venkateswara Art Creations
- Release date: 5 March 2021
- Running time: 138 minutes
- Country: India
- Language: Telugu

Play Back is a 2021 Indian Telugu-language science fiction drama film written and directed by Jakka Hari Prasad. The film stars Dinesh Tej, Ananya Nagalla, Arjun Kalyan, and Spandana. Play Back is marketed as the first Indian film based on cross time connection. The plot follows Karthik (Tej) and Sujatha (Nagalla), two people from different time periods who connect together through a phone call. The film was released on 5 March 2021. The director remade the film in Kannada as Gana (2025).

== Plot ==
In 2019, crime reporter Karthik, who works in TV5, moves into an old house. The landline in his house receives a phone call from Sujatha which is intended for someone else. Sujatha's landline, however, repeatedly connects only to Kathik's landline. With no choice left, Sujatha seeks Karthik's help on her passport issue which he obliges. He tries to help her out but soon they realize that they are in different time periods, Karthik in 2019 and Sujatha in 1993.

== Cast ==
- Dinesh Tej as Karthik
- Ananya Nagalla as Sujatha
- Arjun Kalyan as Vasu
- Thummala Narsimha Reddy as Henchman
- Spandana
- Karthikeya Krishna Malladi
- Ashok Vardhan
- TV5 Murthy
- Ananda Chakrapani as Sujatha's father
- Aishwarya Lakshmi
- Gowtham Raju
- Deepthi
- Vishnu
- Surya as scientist

== Production and release ==
Hari Prasad Jakka who worked as a co-writer for Sukumar's films such as 100% Love (2011) and 1: Nenokkadine (2014) helmed the project. The film was theatrically released on 5 March 2021. It was later released on the streaming platform Aha on 25 May 2021.

== Reception ==
Venkata Chari of HMTV appreciated Jakka's direction and his handling of the cross-time concept, stating: "This is a film that would thrill the audience." He opined that the film could have been better had the loop-holes been addressed. Surya Prakash of Asianet News rated the film 2.75/5 also echoed the same and lauded the novel attempt. He compared the film with the 2016 South Korean TV series Signal but added that Jakka adapted the script to Telugu nativity with more emotion and drama.

A reviewer of Zee Cinemalu rated the film 2.5 out of 5 and opined that the casting could've been better. "Ananya was decent but none of the other actors could do justice for their characters," they added. 123Telugu.com also rated it 2.5/5 and concluded: "On the whole, Play Back is a family thriller that has a fresh concept that deals with a cross-time telephone conversation. Though the movie has a few interesting moments here and there, lack of proper narration in the second half comes as a speed breaker."

== See also ==
- 2021 in film
- Cinema of India
- Frequency, 2000 American film where a father and son connect over ham radio between different time periods
