= Mathu Vadalara =

- Theatrical release poster
- Directed by: Ritesh Rana
- Written by: Ritesh Rana
- Produced by: Cherry; Hemalatha Pedamallu
- Starring: Sri Simha; Naresh Agastya; Athulya Chandra; Satya
- Cinematography: Suresh Sarangam
- Edited by: Karthika Srinivas
- Music by: Kaala Bhairava
- Production companies: Clap Entertainment; Mythri Movie Makers
- Release date: 25 December 2019
- Running time: 130 minutes
- Country: India
- Language: Telugu

Mathu Vadalara (transl. Leave the intoxication) is a 2019 Indian Telugu-language comedy thriller film directed by debutante Ritesh Rana. The film features Sri Simha, Naresh Agastya, Athulya Chandra and Satya in the lead roles while Brahmaji and Vennela Kishore play supporting roles. Kaala Bhairava scored the music. The plot follows Babu (Simha), a delivery boy who gets stuck in an apartment alone after accidentally taking water mixed with hallucinogens.

The film's title was inspired by a song from the mythological film Sri Krishna Pandaveeyam (1966). The film was released on 25 December 2019 and opened to positive reviews. It was successful at the box office. The sequel Mathu Vadalara 2 is released in 2024, which was also a commercial success at the box office.

== Plot ==
Babu and Yesu are delivery men and friends living with their friend Abhi, who is unemployed and binge-watches crime TV shows. With Babu struggling to make ends meet, Yesu reveals how he slyly steals from his clients and suggests Babu do the same. Although Babu is hesitant initially, he decides to pursue the strategy. The next day, he goes to an isolated gated apartment complex. He has a few abnormal chance encounters: Tejaswi, from flat 503, who runs into him with a scooter; Banerjee, a police constable as part of passport verification; and a resident named Ravi. He reaches apartment 401, delivers a package to an old lady, steals one ₹500 note and attempts to get her to believe she underpaid him. When she realizes his bluff, a scuffle ensues and the old lady falls to the ground. After noticing her lifeless, Babu imagines Yesu and Abhi advising him about how to handle the situation and trying to cover up the crime. He takes her body to her room to make it look like she died in her sleep. He then notices Bujji, who has been home all along with music playing through her headphones.

A security guard enters the apartment, prompting Babu to hide in a closet in the bathroom. Babu witnesses the security guard enter the bathroom, under the rouse of fixing the shower, and replacing the memory card in a spy camera he had installed previously. Babu takes the camera and messages Yesu and Abhi seeking help. Meanwhile, Bujji invites Ravi into the apartment to smoke marijuana. It is then revealed that Bujji also drugged the old lady by contaminating her water bottle and inadvertently drugs Babu as well. Soon, Babu ends up asleep in Bujji's bedroom. Upon waking up, Babu finds himself in the living room next to a dead body. Horrified, he escapes and finds Yesu downstairs, and goes home. In his bag, Babu notices his delivery packages are missing and instead finds ₹50 lakh (US$52,000). He also finds Banerjee's mobile phone, helping him realise that the dead body was Banerjee's. With Yesu and Abhi's help, Babu plans to escape by retrieving his bike and packages and deleting the video footage from the security cameras. Upon reaching 401, he finds the old lady alive, and that the girl he met the previous day was not Tejaswi, after meeting another man, who is the real Tejaswi, from 503, in a chance encounter

He also realizes that he woke up in apartment 501 and not 401. Upon entering 501, they find Banerjee's dead body. After retrieving the packages, they find the girl unconscious in a hidden drug lab in the apartment. Babu realizes that 501 is Ravi's flat and soon they find Ravi's dead body as well. By threatening the watchman, he retrieves the spy camera from 401. The girl wakes up and engages in a minor scuffle, they interrogate her. She reveals herself as Myra, a drug dealer, came to pack drugs from Ravi, who cooks and supplies drugs. When Myra was waiting in 501 the previous morning, Banerjee came to Ravi's apartment for details about a neighbour. But instead, Banerjee learns about the drug lab. While Ravi was negotiating a bribe, Myra, under influence, kills Banerjee. Babu then reveals that Abhi was the mastermind after seeing him in the camera footage earlier, and beats him up. Abhi explains that he cooked the drugs and Ravi supplied them.

Upon finding Banerjee's dead body, Abhi hatched an escape plan and knocks out Myra and kills Ravi. With Babu contacting him from 401 seeking help, he planned to frame Babu by leaving him in the middle of a staged crime scene. Enraged, Babu destroys the lab causing an explosion of drugs and getting everyone high. Weeks later, Babu and Yesu wake up and find out from the interrogating detective that both Abhi and Myra are now mentally unstable. In exchange for the money, the detective lets them go scot-free. In the pre-roll credits, the Prime Minister of India declares all current ₹500 and ₹1000 currency notes illegal making the detective's newfound money completely useless.

== Cast ==
- Sri Simha as Babu Mohan "Babu"
- Satya as Yesu Dasu "Yesu"
- Naresh Agastya as Abhi
- Athulya Chandra as Myra
- Brahmaji as S. Banerjee
- Vennela Kishore as Ravi Teja
- Ajay as Tejaswi Thota
- Jeeva as a detective
- Vidyullekha Raman as Bujji
- Gundu Sudharshan as a security guard
- Pavala Syamala as an old woman
- Ajay Ghosh as a house owner

== Themes and influences ==
The film was inspired by several true incidents including a door delivery man who would take extra rupee notes from customers and hides it underneath his shirt and a 2017 incident in which a man was dubbed "The Ganja Grower of Golconda", both of which are shown in the film's end credits. The serial Ori Na Koduka that appears in the film, which is about a husband who is still alive and cares for his wife despite getting shot in the head, is based on an episode from the 2014 Tamil serial Chandralekha broadcast on Sun TV in which the roles were reversed. The absurdity of the happenings in the serial was meant as a jab at the over-the-top nature of Indian serials. The name of the character Yesu Dasu (played by Satya) was inspired by the name of the veteran Indian playback singer.

== Soundtrack ==
The songs were composed by Kaala Bhairava. Lyrics were written by M. M. Keeravani and Rakendu Mouli.

- "Mathu Vadalara (Title Track)" - Kaala Bhairava
- "Saalaa Rey Saalaa" - Pruthvi Chandra

== Release ==
The film was released on 25 December 2019. Additional screens and shows were added in Hyderabad a few days later.

== Reception ==
The Times of India gave the film a rating of three out of five stars and stated that the film is "a perfect thriller which makes audience glued to their seats and also spills some laughs". The Hindu wrote that "Mathu Vadalara isn’t a very crafty thriller, which it could have been with some more effort. But it’s definitely a step in that direction by a new team that’s brimming with ideas". Hemant Kumar of Firstpost rated the film 3.25/5 and wrote, "Mathu Vadalara is a worthy addition to the new age Telugu cinema, and it wins you over with its clever use of humour and suspense to build a gripping narrative."

== Accolades ==
Award	Date of ceremony	Category	Recipient(s) and nominee(s)	Result	Ref.
Critics Choice Film Awards	28 March 2020	Best Writing	Ritesh Rana, R. Teja	Nominated	
South Indian International Movie Awards	18 September 2021	Best Comedian – Telugu	Satya	Nominated	
South Indian International Movie Awards	18 September 2021	Best Male Debut – Telugu	Sri Simha	Won	
South Indian International Movie Awards	18 September 2021	Best Debut Director – Telugu	Ritesh Rana	Nominated	

== Sequel ==
In August 2024, the sequel was announced with Faria Abdullah, Rohini, and Sunil being the new additions to the franchise, while Sri Simha Koduri, Satya, and Vennela Kishore would be reprising their roles.
