= Jetlee =

2026 Indian Telugu film by Ritesh Rana

- Theatrical release poster
- Directed by: Ritesh Rana
- Written by: Ritesh Rana; Jeyendhra Aerrola
- Produced by: Chiranjeevi "Cherry"; Hemalatha Pedamallu
- Starring: Satya; Rhea Singha; Vennela Kishore
- Cinematography: Suresh Sarangam
- Edited by: Karthika Srinivas
- Music by: Kaala Bhairava
- Production company: Clap Entertainment
- Release date: 1 May 2026
- Running time: 132 minutes
- Country: India
- Language: Telugu

Jetlee is a 2026 Indian Telugu-language comedy thriller nonsense film co-written and directed by Ritesh Rana. The film features Satya, Rhea Singha and Vennela Kishore in important roles.

Produced by Clap Entertainment, the film was released on 1 May 2026 to mixed reviews.

== Plot ==
=== The Extradition ===
CBI agent Shivani Roy (Rhea Singha) arrests the notorious criminal Prajapathi in Dubai and boards a special flight to extradite him back to Kochi, India.

=== The Turbulence ===
Midway through the journey, rival crime syndicates launch deadly attempts to assassinate Prajapathi. At the same time, Prajapathi secretly begins planning his own escape, turning the flight into a chaotic, high-stakes battlefield in the sky.

=== The Mystery ===
Amid the chaos emerges Ved Vyas (Satya), a mysterious man suffering from memory loss and a fractured identity. As assassins, intelligence officers, and Vyas collide in a deadly game of survival, it becomes a race against time to uncover the truth — and determine whose side everyone is really on.

== Cast ==
- Satya as Dr. Veda Vyas a.k.a not Jetlee
- Rhea Singha as Agent Shivani Roy
- Vennela Kishore as Satya
- Ajay as Dharmesh Prajapathi, CEO of Prajapathi Bank
- Harsha Chemudu as Pilot Captain Kotappa Konda "KK"
- Subhalekha Sudhakar as Harish Chandra, COO of Prajapathi Bank and Satya’s father
- Srinivasa Reddy as Father
- Kabir Duhan Singh as Jackie
- Getup Srinu as Simpson Seenu
- Gundu Sudarshan as Noorjahan
- Shailaja Durvasula as Flight attendant Natasha
- Vadlamani Srinivas as Home Minister Melkote
- P.V. Sai Somayajulu as First Officer Orry Konda "O.K"
- Mani Sai K as Dilip, Shivani’s assistant
- Suresh Kommineni as Sagar, Shivani’s assistant
- Sai Smaran Dasu as Benji
- Lakshya Sri Siddhika as Flight Passenger
- Mathew Varghese as Varghese, National Security Advisor
- Rajkumar as Informer

== Production ==
When deciding to do a film entirely set in an aeroplane, Ritesh Rana was advised against it since it was experimental. He modified the lead character to suit Satya. An entire aeroplane set was built for the film that depicted a flight from Dubai to Kochi.

== Music ==
The soundtrack and background score were composed by Kaala Bhairava.

All lyrics are written by P. V. Sai Somayajulu.

Track listing
No.	Title	Singer(s)	Length
1.	"Turbulence"	Aditya Iyengar, Sindhuja Srinivasan	4:08
2.	"Satya Is Not Jetlee"	Sravana Bhargavi	3:14
3.	"Jetlee Phonk"	Kaala Bhairava	2:47

== Release and reception ==
Jetlee was released on 1 May 2026.

The Assam Tribune rated it 2.75 out of 5 "with stronger writing in the second half, Jetlee could have been a far sharper and more consistently engaging". Srivathsan Nadadhur of The Hindu opined that the cast gives their all to salvage the film, but they ultimately end up contributing to the cacophony. Suresh Kavirayani of Cinema Express gave a rating of 1 out of 5 and felt narration is the biggest drawback of the film, while noting the performance of Satya and Vennela Kishore.
