= Junior (2025 film) =

2025 Indian film by Radha Krishna Reddy

- Theatrical release poster
- Directed by: Radha Krishna Reddy
- Written by: Radha Krishna Reddy
- Dialogues by: Kalyan Chakravarthi
- Produced by: Sai Korrapati
- Starring: Kireeti Reddy; Genelia D'Souza; Sreeleela; V. Ravichandran
- Cinematography: K. K. Senthil Kumar
- Edited by: Niranjan Devaramane
- Music by: Devi Sri Prasad
- Production company: Vaaraahi Chalana Chitram
- Distributed by: Mythri Movie Makers
- Release date: 18 July 2025
- Running time: 154 minutes
- Country: India
- Languages: Telugu; Kannada
- Budget: ₹25 crore
- Box office: ₹16 crore

Junior is a 2025 Indian action drama film written and directed by Radha Krishna Reddy, and produced by Sai Korrapati through Vaaraahi Chalana Chitram. Shot simultaneously in Telugu and Kannada languages, the film features Kireeti Reddy, Genelia D'Souza, Sreeleela and V. Ravichandran in important roles.

The film was released on 18 July 2025. The film was a box office bomb.

== Plot ==
College is where Abhinav hopes to finally find some distance between him and his possessive father Kodandapani, after enduring a childhood of helicopter parenting. He dedicates the 4 years of his engineering degree to making memories, with teachers, friends and a special someone. Desperate to keep his father at arm's length and to woo his love-interest Spoorthy, Abhi lands an internship with a software giant Rise Solutions. After joining, he gets into beef with his headstrong manager Vijaya Soujanya, who happens to be the daughter of the company's chairman Gopal. Frustrated with Vijaya's rude and strict mannerisms, Abhi works with dedication and uncovers a scam within the company planted by Vijaya's rival. Vijaya gets appointed as CEO by the owner Gopal. Abhi is told will be dismissed by Vijaya after Vijaya takes the charge. Abhi grief struck tells his friend she cannot throw him like that.During the CEO announcement programme to everyone, a video is kept by abhis friend to praise Vijaya but the video gets scrapped and abhi is seen click his hand in success of giving a prick for Vijaya.

After the programme, abhi goes and booze while abhis father Ravichandra comes in the gate asking gate keeper for abhi and this is seen by Gopal who calls abhi, Abhi uncovers secrets about his family from Gopal. He realizes that Vijaya is actually his elder sister and she was adopted by Gopal long before he was born, as his father was unable to bear her medical expenses and gave her up to Gopal and his wife. He also realizes that Vijaya turned cold because of this and despises both Gopal and her father. Abhi realises from doctor his father has Alzheimer's disease so can forget everyone including his surroundings also. Abhi takes pledge to care his father very well hereafter. Vijaya now as CEO gets advised by Gopal to clear the scam issue as it's a very important thing to clear. Vijaya tried to find out what happened in the village but finds nobody cooperating. Abhi finally takes everyone of the village to believe them by constant personal interactions.Vijaya finds abhi did everything to get villagers to cooperate and explain their needs. Later Vijaya visits the village and comes to abhi house, later Vijaya gets emotional, while same time a goon attack abhi but the hit goes to abhis father who gets hospitalised. Vijaya visits abhis father and abhis father now recognises and joins Vijaya but same time forgets abhi as son. Later abhis father is staying with Vijaya and abhi now stranger to abhis father continues his work with inside grief filled for his father.

== Cast ==
- Kireeti Reddy as K. Abhinav "Abhi"
- Genelia D'Souza as Vijaya Soujanya, Abhi's sister
- Sreeleela as Spoorthy, Abhi’s love-interest
- Ravichandran as Kodandapani
- Rao Ramesh as Gopal
- Sudha Rani as Shyamala
- Achyuth Kumar as Vittalachari, Panchayat President
- Satya as Manish Manjurekar
- Harsha Chemudu as S. Kamal Hassan aka Kannan
- Kiran Srinivas as Vijaya’s rival
- Killi Kranthi
- Girija Lokesh as Saroja’s grandmother
- Govinde Gowda as Vittalachari’s assistant
- Sharmitha Gowda as Gopal’s wife
- Sivannarayana Naripeddi as a doctor
- Suman Setty as Shopkeeper
- Lakshman Tekumudi as Abhi’s friend
- Geetha Bhaskar as a Villager
- Inaya Sulthana as Saroja
- Vaijanath Biradar
- Brahmanandam (cameo appearance in the song "Viral Vayyari")

== Production ==
It marked Genelia return to Telugu film industry after 13 years.

== Music ==
The soundtrack and background score is composed by Devi Sri Prasad.

Telugu track listing
No.	Title	Lyrics	Singer(s)	Length
1.	"Let's Live This Moment"	Sri Mani	Jaspreet Jasz	4:28
2.	"Viral Vayyari"	Kalyan Chakravarthy	Haripriya, Devi Sri Prasad	4:48
3.	"Junior Anthem"	Kalyan Chakravarthy	Yazin Nizar	3:16
4.	"Update Avvaale"	Kalyan Chakravarthy	Ram Miriyala	2:59
5.	"Jola Padina"	Kalyan Chakravarthy	Kareemullah	2:38

All lyrics are written by Pavan Bhat.

Kannada track listing
No.	Title	Singer(s)	Length
1.	"Let's Live This Moment"	Nakul Abhyankar	4:28
2.	"Viral Vayyari"	Haripriya, Deepak Blue	4:48
3.	"Junior Anthem"	Deepak Blue	3:16
4.	"Update Aagbeku"	Santhosh Venky	2:59
5.	"Helo Devane"	Santhosh Venky	2:38

== Release and reception ==
Junior was released 18 July 2025. Telugu version was later released on Aha and Amazon Prime Video on 30 September 2025, and Kannada version was released on Namma Flix.

== Reception ==
Sangeetha Devi Dundoo of The Hindu wrote, "Junior plays out like an extended showreel for Kireeti Reddy, highlighting his screen presence, dancing chops, aptitude for action, and ability to well up on cue". BVS Prakash of Deccan Chronicle gave the film 1.5 out of 5 stars and felt that the film lacks "novelty, emotional depth, or engaging drama".Film turned out to be commercial failure and nothing new to offer audience
