= Satya (Telugu actor) =

Indian actor and comedian

- Born: Satya Akkala; Amalapuram, Andhra Pradesh, India
- Occupations: Actor; Comedian
- Years active: 2007–present

Satya Akkala is an Indian actor and comedian who works in Telugu cinema. He won the SIIMA Award for Best Comedian – Telugu for Chalo (2018) and Mathu Vadalara 2 (2024).

== Career ==
Satya hails from Amalapuram, Andhra Pradesh. He discontinued his B. Tech education at BVC Institute of Technology and Sciences, to pursue a career in films. Initially, he started as an assistant director and worked for films such as Drona (2009) and TV series Amrutham. He played the role of Pulakesi in the film Pilla Zamindar (2011). Director Sudheer Varma who liked his mannerisms in the film, cast him in a key role in Swamy Ra Ra (2013). The film earned him recognition. Satya was also featured in the comedy show Jabardasth.

In 2019, Satya played one of the leads in comedy thriller film Mathu Vadalara (2019). One critic from The Hindu noted, "Sathya gets some of the best lines" while another critic from The Times of India stated that "Yesu is well-written and Satya outperformed it with ease. He proved how hilarious he can be with a well-crafted character". In 2021, he starred as the lead actor in the film Vivaha Bhojanambu.

== Filmography ==
Key
†	Denotes films that have not yet been released

=== Actor ===
Year	Title	Role	Notes
2009	Drona	Pub attendee	
2010	Kalavar King	Satya Darling	
2011	Kodipunju	Abhimanyu's friend	
2011	Pilla Zamindar	Pulakesi	
2012	Gabbar Singh	Tea shop vendor	
2012	Cameraman Gangatho Rambabu	Blind beggar	
2013	Chammak Challo	Shyam's friend	
2013	Swamy Ra Ra	Ravi	
2013	Sukumarudu	Drama troupe member	
2013	1000 Abaddalu	Satya's friend	
2013	Vasundhara Nilayam		
2013	Ramayya Vasthavayya	Nandu's friend	
2013	Venkatadri Express	Hawker	
2013	Prema Ishq Kaadhal	Millennium Star's assistant	
2014	Rabhasa	Karthik's friend	
2014	Karthikeya	Ravi	
2014	Rowdy Fellow	Gavaskar	
2015	Surya vs Surya	Auto Aruna Sai	
2015	S/O Satyamurthy	Thief	
2015	Dohchay	Samba	
2015	Asura	Kondababu	
2015	Tiger	Software engineer	
2015	James Bond	Shekhar	
2015	Cinema Choopistha Mava	Bus conductor	
2015	Ketugadu	Restaurant waiter	
2016	Thikka	Stephen	
2016	Speedunnodu	Babu	
2016	Selfie Raja	Mams's assistant	
2016	Savithri		
2016	Majnu	Kashi	
2016	Premam	Dance choreographer	
2016	Ekkadiki Pothavu Chinnavada	Satya	
2017	Gunturodu	Kanna's friend	
2017	Cine Mahal		
2017	Mister	Doctor	
2017	Lanka	Sai's friend	
2017	Keshava	Taxi Driver Malinga	
2017	Andhhagadu	Kishore	
2017	Kathalo Rajakumari		
2017	Jai Lava Kusa	Ali	
2017	Oye Ninne	Vishnu's friend	
2017	C/O Surya	Ramesh	
2017	London Babulu	Pandu	
2017	Snehamera Jeevitham		
2017	Okka Kshanam	Satyam	
2018	Touch Chesi Chudu	Constable	
2018	Chalo	Satya	SIIMA Award for Best Comedian – Telugu
2018	Rangasthalam	Veera Babu	
2018	Chal Mohan Ranga	Mohan's friend	
2018	Lover	Balu	
2018	Devadas	Jacket	
2018	Hello Guru Prema Kosame	Sanju's friend	
2018	Savyasachi	Tenali	
2018	Amar Akbar Anthony	Jr. K. A. Paul	
2018	Idam Jagath	Anand	
2019	Suryakantham	Sunny	
2019	Seven	Journalist	Simultaneously shot in Tamil
2019	Viswamitra	Mitra's lover	
2019	Gang Leader	Subramanyam	
2019	Gaddalakonda Ganesh	Chintakkayi	
2019	Arjun Suravaram	Arjun's friend	
2019	Mathu Vadalara	Yesu Dasu	Nominated – SIIMA Award for Best Comedian – Telugu
2019	Bhagyanagara Veedullo Gamattu	Jojo	
2020	Sarileru Neekevvaru	Train Passenger	
2020	Disco Raja	Philip	
2020	Aswathama	Gana's cousin	
2020	Bheeshma	Uber Driver	
2020	Orey Bujjiga	Gopi	
2020	IIT Krishnamurthy	Mahesh Babu	
2020	Solo Brathuke So Better	Murali	Nominated – SIIMA Award for Best Comedian – Telugu
2021	Alludu Adhurs	Bandar Pichai	
2021	Red	Vema	
2021	Ninnila Ninnila	Rajesh	
2021	Sreekaram	Karthik's friend	
2021	Gaali Sampath	Gaali Sampath's translator	
2021	Akshara	Sampath Sarangi	
2021	A1 Express	Satya	
2021	Thellavarithe Guruvaram	Veeru's uncle	
2021	Vivaha Bhojanambu	Mahesh	Debut as Lead actor
2021	Adbhutham	Prasad	
2021	Lakshya	Pardhu's friend	
2022	Hero	Arjun's friend	
2022	Aadavallu Meeku Johaarlu	Prem	
2022	Ghani	Vijender's servant	
2022	F3	Thief	
2022	Happy Birthday	Max Pain	
2022	Ranga Ranga Vaibhavanga	Village Sarpanch	
2022	Krishna Vrinda Vihari	Giri	
2022	Karthikeya 2	Ravi	
2022	Highway	Samudram	
2023	Agent	Geetha	
2023	Ramabanam	Ajju	
2023	Anni Manchi Sakunamule	Voscar Gangaraju	
2023	Rangabali	Agadham	
2023	Changure Bangaru Raja		
2023	Bhaag Saale	Promise Reddy	
2023	Bhola Shankar	Bhola’s friend	
2023	Bedurulanka 2012		
2023	Spark Life	Rakesh	
2023	Devil: The British Secret Agent	Sastry	
2024	Hanu-Man	Gunneswara Rao	
2024	Chaari 111	Rahul	
2024	Ravikula Raghurama		
2024	Geethanjali Malli Vachindi	Ayaan	
2024	Purushothamudu	Rachit’s friend	
2024	Mr. Bachchan	Dora Babu	
2024	Mathu Vadalara 2	Yesu Dasu	SIIMA Award for Best Comedian – Telugu
2024	Appudo Ippudo Eppudo	Thief	
2024	Zebra	Bob	
2024	Pushpa 2: The Rule	Japanese translator	
2025	Game Changer	Ram’s friend	
2025	Daaku Maharaaj	Constable	
2025	Ramam Raghavam	Anji	
2025	Dilruba		
2025	Akkada Ammayi Ikkada Abbayi	Bilal	
2025	Single	Surendra	
2025	Junior	Manish Manjurekar	Simultaneously shot in Kannada
2025	Sundarakanda	Satya	
2025	Mithra Mandali	Important Character	
2025	Dude	Rahul	Tamil film; Extended cameo appearance
2025	Andhra King Taluka	Chanti	
2026	Sahakutumbaanaam	Dr. Ling	
2026	Vanaveera	Special Officer	
2026	The RajaSaab	Warden	
2026	Bhartha Mahasayulaku Wignyapthi	Bellam	
2026	Nari Nari Naduma Murari	Lovekusa	
2026	Vishnu Vinyasam	Satya	
2026	Jetlee	Veda Vyas	Lead role
2026	Peddi	Thulam	
2026	Korean Kanakaraju	Kishtappa	
2026	Aadarsha Kutumbam House No: 47	Chittaranjan	

=== Voice actor ===
Year	Title	Actor	Notes
2023	Varisu	Yogi Babu	Telugu dubbed version

=== Television ===
List of Satya television credits
Year	Title	Role	Channel	Notes	Ref.
2007	Amrutham	Ramu	Gemini TV	Episode: "UN Happy Days Part 2"	
2013	Jabardasth	Various	ETV		
