= Kaala Bhairava =

Indian singer

- Born: Koduri Kaala Bhairava; 7 August 1993 (age 33); Kovvur, Andhra Pradesh, India
- Occupations: Singer; Music Composer; Actor
- Years active: 2007–present
- Parent(s): M. M. Keeravani (father); M. M. Srivalli (Mother)
- Relatives: Sri Simha (brother); S. S. Rajamouli (uncle); Kalyan Koduri (uncle)

Koduri Kaala Bhairava is an Indian playback singer and music director, who works predominantly in Telugu cinema. He has sung songs in Tamil, Hindi, Malayalam and Kannada in addition to Telugu. He was the composer of the films Mathu Vadalara, Karthikeya 2 and Colour Photo, which received positive reviews and critical acclaim. Bhairava is recipient of a National Film Award, a Filmfare Award and a SIIMA Award.

== Early life ==
His father, M. M. Keeravani is a popular music composer, while his brother Sri Simha is an actor. He is the nephew of director S. S. Rajamouli.

== Career ==
He garnered acclaim for his songs in Baahubali 2: The Conclusion (2017) and "Peniviti" from Aravinda Sametha Veera Raghava (2018). He made his debut as a music director with Mathu Vadalara (2019) starring his younger brother Sri Simha.

He is best known for his work with his father on the soundtrack for the 2022 film RRR. Bhairava and Rahul Sipligunj performed the Oscar-winning song "Naatu Naatu" at the 95th Academy Awards on 12 March 2023.

== Discography ==
=== As playback singer ===
- (D) indicates dubbed version.

Year	Film	Song	Music director	Language	Notes
2011	Rajanna	"Gjijigadu"	M. M. Keeravani	Telugu	
2012	Makkhi (D)	"Sapnon Ki Ek Duniya Hai"	M. M. Keeravani	Hindi	
2013	Anthaka Mundu Aa Tarvatha	"Hey Kanipettey"	Kalyan Koduri	Telugu	
2015	Baahubali: The Beginning (D)	"Khoya Hain"	M. M. Keeravani	Hindi	
2015	Inji iduppazhagi	"Mella Mella Kalavu"	M. M. Keeravani	Tamil	
2016	Kundanapu Bomma	"Neetho Aithe"	M. M. Keeravani	Telugu	
2017	Baahubali 2: The Conclusion	"Dandaalayyaa"	M. M. Keeravani	Telugu	
2017	Baahubali 2: The Conclusion	"Oka Praanam"	M. M. Keeravani	Telugu	
2017	Baahubali 2: The Conclusion	"Vandhaai Ayya"	M. M. Keeravani	Tamil	
2017	Baahubali 2: The Conclusion	"Oru Yaagam"	M. M. Keeravani	Tamil	
2017	Baahubali 2: The Conclusion (D)	"Shivam"	M. M. Keeravani	Hindi	
2017	Yuddham Sharanam	"Yuddham Sharanam"	Vivek Sagar	Telugu	
2017	Jawaan	''Bomma Adirindhi''	S. Thaman	Telugu	
2017	Malli Raava	"Adugasale"	Shravan Bharadwaj	Telugu	
2018	Rangula Ratnam	"Nuvvu Leni"	Sricharan Pakala	Telugu	
2018	Tholi Prema	"Toliprema"	S. Thaman	Telugu	
2018	Juvva	"Oo Kala"	M. M. Keeravani	Telugu	
2018	Kirrak Party	"Pranamantha"	B. Ajaneesh Loknath	Telugu	
2018	Krishnarjuna Yudham	"Thaaney Vachhindhanaa"	Hiphop Tamizha	Telugu	
2018	Vijetha	"Adugaduguna"	Harshavardhan Rameshwar	Telugu	
2018	Chi La Sow	"Down Down"	Prashanth R Vihari	Telugu	
2018	Neevevaro	"Oh Cheli"	Achu Rajamani	Telugu	
2018	Aravinda Sametha Veera Raghava	"Peniviti"	S. Thaman	Telugu	
2018	Amar Akbar Anthony	"Guppeta"	S. Thaman	Telugu	
2018	Orange	"Brotheru Brotheru"	S. Thaman	Kannada	
2018	Bhairava Geetha	"Mudduga Mosavu"	Ravi Shankar	Telugu	
2018	Antariksham 9000 KMPH	"Antarikshayanam"	Prashanth R Vihari	Telugu	
2018	Naa Love Story	"Nanne Vadhili Poye"	Vedanivaan	Telugu	
2018	Operation 2019	"Vandemataram"	Rap Rock Shakeel	Telugu	
2019	NTR: Kathanayakudu; NTR: Mahanayakudu	"Chaitanya Ratham"	M. M. Keeravani	Telugu	
2019	NTR: Kathanayakudu; NTR: Mahanayakudu	"Rajarshi"	M. M. Keeravani	Telugu	
2019	Vinaya Vidheya Rama	"Amma Nanna"	Devi Sri Prasad	Telugu	
2019	Mr. Majnu	"Naalo Neeku"	S. Thaman	Telugu	
2019	Yajamana	"Shivanandi"	V. Harikrishna	Kannada	
2019	Yatra	"Samara Shankham"	K	Telugu	
2019	Majili	"Yedetthu Mallele"	Gopi Sundar	Telugu	
2019	Jersey	"Spirit Of Jersey"	Anirudh Ravichander	Telugu	
2019	Nuvvu Thopu Raa	"Cheppamma Jeevithama"	Suresh Bobbili	Telugu	
2019	Dear Comrade	"Yetu Pone"	Justin Prabhakaran	Telugu	
2019	Rakshasudu	"Naa Chinni Thalli"	Ghibran	Telugu	
2019	Guna 369	"Dhamaruka"	Chaitan Bharadwaj	Telugu	
2019	Kathanam	"O Amma"	Roshan Salur	Telugu	
2019	Mathu Vadalara	"Mathu Vadalara (Title Track)"	Himself	Telugu	Also composer
2020	Choosi Choodangaane	"Yemaindho Thelusa"	Gopi Sundar	Telugu	
2020	Colour Photo	"Tharagathi Gadhi"	Himself	Telugu	Also composer
2020	Colour Photo	"Arere Aakasham"	Himself	Telugu	Also composer
2020	Colour Photo	"Tharagathi Pathos"	Himself	Telugu	Also composer
2020	Poratam	"Nee Dhairyamey"	Neelesh Mandalapu	Telugu	Short film
2020	Ksheera Saagara Madhanam	"Malli Malli Aalochinchu"	Ajay Arasada	Telugu	
2021	Krishnam	"Tholi Saari"	Hari Prasad R	Telugu	
2021	Zombie Reddy	"Mrithyunjaya"	Mark K. Robin	Telugu	
2021	Thellavarithe Guruvaram	"Are Em Ayyindho Emo"	Himself	Telugu	Also composer
2021	Natyam	"Namah Shivaya"	Shravan Bharadwaj	Telugu	
2021	Tuck Jagadish	"Inkosaari Inkosaari"	S. Thaman	Telugu	
2021	Golmaal 2020	"Manninchave Oh Cheliya"	Kanishka	Telugu	
2021	Devarakondalo Vijay Premakatha	"Idhem Nyayame"	Sadachandra	Telugu	
2021	Devarakondalo Vijay Premakatha	"Nuvvo Sagam"	Sadachandra	Telugu	
2021	Konda Polam	"Chettekki"	M. M. Keeravani	Telugu	
2021	Gully Rowdy	"Thalladilli Podha"	Sai Karthik	Telugu	
2021	Pelli SandaD	"Madhura Nagarilo"	M. M. Keeravani	Telugu	
2021	RRR	"Naatu Naatu"	M. M. Keeravani	Telugu	
2021	RRR	"Komuram Bheemudo"	M. M. Keeravani	Telugu	
2021	RRR (D)	"Dosti"	M. M. Keeravani	Kannada	
2021	RRR (D)	"Komuram Bheemudho"	M. M. Keeravani	Kannada	
2021	RRR (D)	"Dosti"	M. M. Keeravani	Hindi	
2021	RRR (D)	"Komuram Bheemudo"	M. M. Keeravani	Hindi	
2021	RRR (D)	"Komuram Beemano"	M. M. Keeravani	Tamil	
2021	RRR (D)	"Komuram Bheemano"	M. M. Keeravani	Malayalam	
2021	Ichata Vahanamulu Niluparadu	"Padmavyuham"	S Darshan	Telugu	
2022	Karthikeya 2	"Krishna Trance"	Kaala Bhairava	Telugu	
2023	Bro	"Jeevame"	Thaman S	Telugu	
2023	Vidhi	"Ee Jagame"	Sricharan Pakala	Telugu	
2024	Bhoothaddam Bhaskar Narayana	"Shiva Trap Trance"	Sricharan Pakala	Telugu	
2024	Aho Vikramaarka	"Amma Song"	Arko Pravo Mukherjee	Telugu	
2024	Music Shop Murthy	"Antarantha Murthy"	Pavan	Telugu	
2024	Jithender Reddy	"Dheera Ra Ra"	Gopi Sundar	Telugu	
2024	Devara: Part 1	"Ayudha Pooja"	Anirudh Ravichandar	Telugu	
2024	Devara: Part 1 (D)	"Ayudha Pooja"	Anirudh Ravichandar	Tamil	
2024	Devara: Part 1 (D)	"Ayudha Pooja"	Anirudh Ravichandar	Hindi	
2024	Devara: Part 1 (D)	"Ayudha Pooja"	Anirudh Ravichandar	Malayalam	
2025	Dear Krishna	"Tholisari Bhadulichinave"	Hariprasad R	Telugu	
2025	Dear Krishna	"Classullo Patallo"	Hariprasad R	Telugu	
2025	28 Degree Celsius	"Gnapakame"	Shravan Bharadwaj	Telugu	
2025	Solo Boy	"Musire Chikatlu"	Judah Sandhy	Telugu	
2025	Kanya Kumari	"Premalo"	Ravi Nidamarthy	Telugu	
2025	Mowgli	"Sayyare"	Himself	Telugu	
2025	Mowgli	"Vanavaasam"	Himself	Telugu	
2026	Nawab Cafe	"Chai Wala"	Prashanth R Vihari	Telugu	
2026	Veerabhadrudu (D)	"God Mode"	Sai Abhyankkar	Telugu	Dubbed version of Karuppu Movie

=== As composer ===
Year	Film/Television Album	Notes
2018	Nanna Koochi	ZEE5 series; only score
2019	Mathu Vadalara	
2020	Colour Photo	
2021	Thellavarithe Guruvaram	
2021	Aakashavaani	
2021	Lakshya	
2022	Bloody Mary	
2022	Happy Birthday	
2022	Modern Love Hyderabad	Amazon Prime Video series
2022	Karthikeya 2	
2022	Dongalunnaru Jaagratha	
2022	Gurthunda Seethakalam	
2022	Mukhachitram	
2023	Bhaag Saale	
2024	Krishnamma	
2024	Mathu Vadalara 2	
2025	Mowgli	
2026	Euphoria	
2026	Mrithyunjay	
2026	Jetlee	
2026	Don't Trouble the Trouble	

=== Music videos/Singles ===
Year	Single	Co-Artist	Language
2019	"Jaamu Raathiri Rekindled"	Hemachandra, Manisha Eerabathini, Deepu, Damini, Mounima, Shruthi, Noel Sean, Prudhvi Chandhra	Telugu
2019	"Virise Virise"	Anjanee Nikhila	Telugu

== Awards and nominations ==
Year	Award	Category	Work	Result	Ref.
2018	Mirchi Music Awards	Upcoming Male Vocalist of The Year	"Shivam" from Baahubali 2: The Conclusion	Nominated	
2018	7th SIIMA	Best Male Playback Singer – Telugu	"Dandalayya" from Baahubali 2: The Conclusion	Won	
2019	8th SIIMA	Best Male Playback Singer – Telugu	"Peniviti" from Aravinda Sametha Veera Raghava	Nominated	
2019	66th Filmfare Awards South	Best Male Playback Singer – Telugu	"Peniviti" from Aravinda Sametha Veera Raghava	Nominated	
2021	10th South Indian International Movie Awards	Best Music Director – Telugu	Colour Photo	Nominated	
2021	10th South Indian International Movie Awards	Best Male Playback Singer – Telugu	"Tharagathi Gadhi" from Colour Photo	Nominated	
2023	69th National Film Awards	Best Male Playback Singer	"Komuram Bheemudo" from RRR	Won	
2023	11th South Indian International Movie Awards	Best Male Playback Singer – Telugu	"Komuram Bheemudo" from RRR	Nominated	
2023	11th South Indian International Movie Awards	Best Male Playback Singer – Telugu	"Naatu Naatu" from RRR	Nominated	
2024	68th Filmfare Awards South	Best Male Playback Singer – Telugu	"Komuram Bheemudo" from RRR	Won	
