= SIIMA Award for Best Comedian – Telugu =

SIIMA Best Comedian in Telugu Movies

- Awarded for: Best Performance by an Actor in a Comedic role in Telugu cinema
- Country: India
- Presented by: Vibri Media Group
- First award: 21 June 2012 (for films released in 2011)
- Most recent winner: Bheemala Revanth Pavan Sai Subhash, Sankranthiki Vasthunam (2025)

Highlights
- Most wins: Brahmanandam (3)
- Most nominations: Vennela Kishore (9)

SIIMA Award for Best Comedian – Telugu is presented by Vibri media group as part of its annual South Indian International Movie Awards, for the best acting done by an actor in a comedic role in Telugu films. The award was first given in 2012 for films released in 2011.

== Superlatives ==
Categories	Recipient	Record
Most wins	Brahmanandam	3
Most consecutive wins	Brahmanandam	2
Most nominations	Vennela Kishore	9
Most consecutive nominations	Brahmanandam	6
Most nominations without a win	Prudhvi Raj	5
Oldest winner	Brahmanandam	Age 56 (1st SIIMA)
Oldest nominee	Brahmanandam	Age 69 (13th SIIMA)
Youngest winner	Bheemala Revanth Pavan Sai Subhash	Age 12 (14th SIIMA)
Youngest nominee	Bheemala Revanth Pavan Sai Subhash	Age 12 (14th SIIMA)

== Winners ==
Year	Actor	Film	Ref
2011	Brahmanandam	Dookudu	
2012	Prabhas Sreenu	Gabbar Singh	
2013	Brahmanandam	Baadshah	
2014	Brahmanandam	Race Gurram	
2015	Vennela Kishore	Bhale Bhale Magadivoy	
2016	Priyadarshi	Pelli Choopulu	
2017	Rahul Ramakrishna	Arjun Reddy	
2018	Satya	Chalo	
2019	Ajay Ghosh	Raju Gari Gadhi 3	
2020	Vennela Kishore	Bheeshma	
2021	Sudharshan	Ek Mini Katha	
2022	Srinivasa Reddy	Karthikeya 2	
2023	Vishnu Oi	Mad	
2024	Satya	Mathu Vadalara 2	
2025	Bheemala Revanth Pavan Sai Subhash	Sankranthiki Vasthunam	

== Nominations ==
- 2011: Brahmanandam – Dookudu
  - Thagubothu Ramesh – Ala Modalaindi
  - M. S. Narayana – Dookudu
  - Srinivasa Reddy – Solo
  - Ali – Mirapakay
- 2012: Prabhas Sreenu – Gabbar Singh
  - Posani Krishna Murali – Krishnam Vande Jagadgurum
  - Bharath – Dhenikaina Ready
  - Brahmanandam – Julayi
  - Ali – Ishq
- 2013: Brahmanandam – Baadshah
  - Posani Krishna Murali – Naayak
  - Vennela Kishore – Doosukeltha
  - Saptagiri – Prema Katha Chitram
  - Josh Ravi – Gunde Jaari Gallanthayyinde
- 2014: Brahmanandam – Race Gurram
  - Ali – Oka Laila Kosam
  - Prudhvi Raj – Loukyam
  - Saptagiri – Kotha Janta
  - Vennela Kishore – Pandavulu Pandavulu Thummeda
- 2015: Vennela Kishore – Bhale Bhale Magadivoy
  - Ali – S/O Satyamurthy
  - Brahmanandam – Bruce Lee: The Fighter
  - Prudhvi Raj – Bengal Tiger
  - Srinivasa Reddy – Pataas
- 2016: Priyadarshi – Pelli Choopulu
  - Brahmanandam – Sarrainodu
  - Krishna Bhagavan – Jayammu Nischayammu Raa
  - Prudhvi Raj – Supreme
  - Vennela Kishore – Majnu
- 2017: Rahul Ramakrishna – Arjun Reddy
  - Praveen – Sathamanam Bhavati
  - Prudhvi Raj – PSV Garuda Vega
  - Shakalaka Shankar – Anando Brahma
  - Srinivasa Reddy – Anando Brahma / Raja The Great
- 2018: Satya – Chalo
  - Prudhvi Raj – Sailaja Reddy Alludu
  - Sunil – Amar Akbar Anthony
  - Vennela Kishore – Chi La Sow
  - Vishnu Oi – Taxiwala
- 2019: Ajay Ghosh – Raju Gari Gadhi 3
  - Priyadarshi – Brochevarevarura
  - Rahul Ramakrishna – Brochevarevarura
  - Abhinav Gomatam – Meeku Maathrame Cheptha
  - Vennela Kishore – Chitralahari
  - Satya – Mathu Vadalara
- 2020: Vennela Kishore – Bheeshma
  - Harsha Chemudu – Colour Photo
  - Satya – Solo Brathuke So Better
  - Sunil – Ala Vaikunthapurramuloo
  - Saptagiri – Orey Bujjiga
- 2021: Sudharshan – Ek Mini Katha
  - Saptagiri – Varudu Kaavalenu
  - Getup Srinu – Zombie Reddy
  - Vennela Kishore – Rang De
  - Ajay Ghosh – Manchi Rojulochaie
- 2022: Srinivasa Reddy – Karthikeya 2
  - Brahmaji – Like, Share & Subscribe
  - Rajendra Prasad – F3: Fun and Frustration
  - Rajkumar Kasireddy – Ashoka Vanamlo Arjuna Kalyanam
  - Vennela Kishore – Sarkaru Vaari Paata
- 2023: Vishnu Oi – Mad
  - Jeevan Kumar – Keedaa Cola
  - Naresh – Samajavaragamana
  - Racha Ravi – Balagam
  - Satya – Rangabali
- 2024: Satya – Mathu Vadalara 2
  - Brahmanandam – Kalki 2898 AD
  - Getup Srinu – Hanu-Man
  - Praneeth Reddy Kallem – Tillu Square
  - Prasad Behara – Committee Kurrollu
- 2025: Bheemala Revanth Pavan Sai Subhash – Sankranthiki Vasthunam
  - Getup Srinu – Mirai
  - Jai Krishna – Little Hearts
  - Krishna Burugula – Jigris
  - Vennela Kishore – Single
  - Vishnu Oi – Mad Square
