= Entha Manchivaadavuraa =

2020 action drama film by Satish Vegesna

- Theatrical release poster
- Directed by: Satish Vegesna
- Screenplay by: Satish Vegesna
- Story by: Chinmay Purohit
- Produced by: Subhash Gupta; Umesh Gupta
- Starring: Kalyan Ram; Mehreen Pirzada
- Cinematography: Raj Thota
- Edited by: Tammiraju
- Music by: Gopi Sundar
- Production company: Aditya Music
- Distributed by: Sri Venkateswara Creations
- Release date: 15 January 2020
- Running time: 144 minutes
- Country: India
- Language: Telugu

Entha Manchivaadavuraa (transl. What a good man you are) is a 2020 Indian Telugu-language action drama film directed by Satish Vegesna. It is an official remake of Gujarati film Oxygen (2018). The film stars Kalyan Ram and Mehreen Pirzada, with the music composed by Gopi Sundar. The film has been jointly produced by Aditya Music’s Subhash Gupta and Umesh Gupta. The film draws its title from an eponymous song of the film Nammina Bantu. The film follows Balu, a short film actor who assumes multiple identities to bond with unrelated people and gives them hope in their most desperate times. It is then that he encounters violence and hatred from some greedy men.

== Plot ==
When her train halts at Yelamanchili due to a blockage, Nandini tells a group of women about her lover Balu in a flashback.

As a young boy, the death of Balu's parents leaves him abandoned. Nandini's father helps Balu by getting him into a boys hostel. 15 years later, Balu grows up to become a short film actor often referred to as Hero by Nandini, while the former refers her to as "Producer". One day, she sees an army uniform in his bag and suspects him. She sends two of her partners to spy on Balu, who discover he is Surya, an army officer with a brother. Similarly, they find a photograph of Balu with an old couple performing Tulabhara as their grandson Shiva. Balu then celebrates Raksha Bandhan with a woman as her brother Rishi. Nandini and team meet Balu at a cafe and question him about his multiple identities. It is then revealed he stopped the old couple, who were left abandoned by their grandson, from committing suicide and being a grandson to them. He agreed to act as a deceased soldier and the brother of a mentally unstable man. He also saved a woman from getting harassed by goons, beating them up and openly proclaiming himself as her brother. Balu then decides to start an organization named as All is well Emotion Suppliers to help people by sending an actor as the relative they want. One day, Balu and Nandini are approached by a woman who wants a son for the happiness of her husband Rama Sharma who is diagnosed with cancer and had lost their son years ago. Balu assumes the identity of Acharya, their son, making Rama Sharma happy about his return. However, an illegal land miner named Gangaraju tries to forcibly acquire signature on a document from Rama Sharma, resulting in two brawls and Gangaraju's arrest.

Balu and Nandini are happy to see their organization running successfully for 6 months. However, the old couple's grandson arrives from America with goons and vandalizes the office. Balu thrashes them, before the old couple arrive to stop him. The old man reveals he transferred his property to Balu because of his love towards them as opposed to how their own grandson treated them. Balu convinces them to not relate love and wealth, and slaps the grandson who was angry for the loss of property. Later, Rama Sharma reveals he knows Balu is not his son, since a man showed him an ad of Balu and Nandini. He slaps Balu and tells him to leave, but Nandini explains Balu's true love for him. Realizing his fault, he re-accepts Balu but later succumbs to cancer. Balu hands over flight tickets for Kashi to Acharya's mother and assures her she can later live with him. Nandini, her fiancé Kishore and Balu are on a car trip and their car breaks down in Munnar, where an old man assists them and takes them to his marriage anniversary party. Meeting his Telugu-speaking wife who misses her relatives, Balu reveals he is her nephew and Nandini tells her she is his wife. The woman gifts the couple before they leave, and Balu reveals he lied to her but also explained his intentions to the old man who made him promise to continue the relation. Seeing Nandini and Balu's love for each other, Kishore refuses to marry her. Eventually, Nandini and Balu get married.

Back to present, Nandini reveals she is 3-months pregnant and leaves the train with her family after Balu tells her to meet him at a point. A priest who claimed to predict Nandini's future runs to inform her about an upcoming obstacle. However, he misses her and Nandini joins Balu and the whole family on a boat. However, a recently released Gangaraju attacks the boat with his henchmen. In the ensuing fight, Nandini is injured and thrown into water. Balu rescues her and kills Gangaraju and slits Gangaraju's throat before himself getting fatally stabbed. A dying Balu is admitted to a hospital where he convinces everyone to move on. However, he survives and months later, his child is born. He and Nandini then leave for a customer who wants a son and daughter-in-law.

== Cast ==
- Nandamuri Kalyan Ram as Balu/Shiva
- Mehreen Pirzada as Nandhini
- Naresh as Vijayakrishna, Nandini's father
- Sarath Babu as Siva Prasad
- Suhasini Maniratnam as Jayalakshmi, Siva Prasad's wife
- Vijayakumar as Lakshminarayana
- Sumithra as Lakshminarayana's wife
- Baladitya as Aditya (Shiva Rao's Son)
- Vennela Kishore as Kishore
- Rajeev Kanakala as Ganga Raju (Illegal Business Man, Land Grabbing Culprit)
- Tanikella Bharani as Rama Sharma
- Pavitra Lokesh as Gayathri, Rama Sharma's wife
- Praveen as Raju
- Prabhas Sreenu as Venu
- Subhalekha Sudhakar as Shiva Rao
- Sivannarayana Naripeddi as Siva Prasad's Relative
- Ravi Varma as Shiva (Lakshminarayana's grand son)
- Pooja Ramachandran as Balu's friend
- Sudharshan as Balu's friend
- Rajashree as Nandini's mother
- Gayatri Bhargavi as Nandini's sister
- Jaya Keerthi Chekuri as Visitor in temple
- Venkat Sriram as Balu's father
- Master Roshan as young Balu
- Akshara Nunna as Bride's daughter
- Natasha Doshi (special appearance in the song Jaataro Jaatara)

== Production ==
=== Development ===
The film commenced in 2019, in Rajahmundry and East Godavari district. Most of the filming was done at locations in Purushottama Patnam, Pendyala, Kovvuru and Kotipalli.

== Release ==
The film was released theatrically on 15 January 2020, coinciding with Sankranthi. It was made available for streaming via Hotstar on 16 February 2020 with English subtitles. The film was also dubbed and released in Hindi as Dumdaar Khiladi 2 in 2022.

== Soundtrack ==
Entha Manchivaadavuraa

Soundtrack album by Gopi Sundar
- Released: 9 October 2019
- Recorded: 2019
- Genre: Feature film soundtrack
- Language: Telugu
- Label: Aditya Music

The music was composed by Gopi Sundar and released by Aditya Music on 9 October 2019.

Track listing
| No. | Title | Lyrics | Singer(s) | Length |
|---|---|---|---|---|
| 1. | "Emo Emo Ye Gundello" | Ramajogayya Sastry | S. P. Balasubrahmanyam | 4:34 |
| 2. | "Avuno Teliyadu" | Sirivennela Seetharama Sastry | Shreya Ghoshal | 4:42 |
| 3. | "Jaataro Jaatara" | Shreemani | Rahul Sipligunj, Sahithi Chaganti | 4:19 |
| 4. | "O Chinna Navve Chalu" | Ramajogayya Sastry | Anurag Kulkarni, Geetha Madhuri | 3:40 |
| Total length: | | | | 18:17 |
