= Golconda High School =

- DVD Cover
- Directed by: Mohan Krishna Indraganti
- Screenplay by: Mohan Krishna Indraganti; Srinivas Avasarala
- Based on: The Men Within (book) by Harimohan Paruvu
- Produced by: Ram Mohan Paruvu
- Starring: Sumanth; Swati Reddy
- Cinematography: K. K. Senthil Kumar
- Edited by: Shravan
- Music by: Kalyani Malik
- Production company: Art Beat Capital
- Distributed by: Artbeat Capital Films
- Release date: 14 January 2011
- Running time: 130 Minutes
- Country: India
- Language: Telugu
- Box office: ₹5 crore distributors' share

Golconda High School is a 2011 Indian Telugu-language sports drama film directed by Mohan Krishna Indraganti under the Artbeat Capital banner. It stars Sumanth and Swati Reddy. The film has cinematographer, K. K. Senthil Kumar while the music was scored by Kalyani Malik. It is based on the book The Men Within, written by Hari Mohan Paruvu. The film was released on 15 January 2011 and was positively reviewed.

The film was commercially successful at the box office.

== Plot ==
Golconda High School's Board of Trustees' member Kireet Das, a head strong man, comes up with a proposal to convert its cricket playground into an IIT coaching center. Principal Viswanath opposes that proposal vehemently, but he's in the minority. Kireet challenges him to show positive results in at least one sport to justify retaining the playground. They come to a challenge that the ground will remain with the school and ask for a proposal for not allowing any constructions permanently in the GHS play ground, if its cricket team wins the State level cricket tournament for upcoming in near 3 months and Kireet Das and Viswanath along with his proposed coach will resign their positions when either of lose the challenge.

To coach them, Vishwanath summons Sampath, his former student with a seemingly chequered past now leaving aimlessly. The team led by Siddanth, and due to their lack of discipline, the team resists Sampath's training. Siddanth then arrogantly challenges Sampath to a student vs. teachers cricket game, the deal being that if the students win, they won't follow his coaching anymore. Sampath, along with Viswanath, plays a good partnership in the game, which eventually leads to the loss of the student team. Towards the end of the game, the frustrated Siddanth deserts his losing team. Gowtham subsequently takes over captaincy, and the students manage to tie the game only because Sampath purposely gets bowled out in the last over. The students get impressed with Sampath's cricketing prowess and decide to follow him despite Siddanth's opposition.

Later, when Sampath helps remove a police case against their team member, Mikey, they realize his compassionate nature and embrace his coaching wholeheartedly. Siddanth, too, eventually follows suit. Meanwhile, Sampath and Anjali an English teacher in the school fall in love and eventually express their feelings with each other she slowly supports him emotionally in his cause to get inter-school cricket championship for GHS after 15 years.

The GHS team, now led by Gowtham, after coming to know of the deal between Kireet and Viswanath over the cricket ground, get further motivated and raise their efforts towards winning every match. The team advances the finals, where they face the strong Everglades team. Just before the finals, the GHS boys come to know that the Everglades coach Sundar and Sampath share some bad blood from the past.

When Sampath refuses to reveal his personal history with Sundar, the team starts doubting him and losing focus, letting their opponents amass a big total. During the break, Viswanath, coming to know of the misunderstanding between coach and team, tells the boys exactly what had happened between Sampath and Sundar 15 years ago. He tells them that Sundar, also an ex GHS student, purposely got Sampath run out during the final championship match, where the latter had played brilliantly. To attain personal glory, Sundar went on to black list Sampath, depriving him of any future in cricket.

The team, upon realising the truth, apologised to Sampath for doubting him. Sampath motivates them with a stirring speech subsequently. GHS comes onto field with 10 batsmen as Siddanth suffers an injury during fielding. They virtually chase down the big score with the marvelous standing by Gowtham facing sledging by Everglades team till the end, but the match is tantalizingly poised in the last over. Siddhanth, to the surprise of everyone, comes back to play with injury and wins the game for GHS off the last ball. Then Sampath meets Sundar reminds him that his day has come by settled score with him after 15 years.

Golconda High School wins the championship for the first time after 15 years, and the cricket ground is saved. Finally, Kireet Das had been resigned from his trusteeship and leaves with shame. Then, finally, the film ends with Sampath getting a good opportunity in a sports academy, leaving his school with pride.

== Cast ==
- Sumanth as Sampath, an alumnus of GHS and a new cricket coach of GHS
- Swati Reddy as Anjali, an English Teacher in the GHS
- Tanikella Bharani as Principal Viswanath, mentor to Sampath and who genuinely believes playing is a basic student right.
- Subbaraju as Kireet Das, a selfish and arrogant trustee of GHS
- Shafi as Madhu Babu, a cunning Mathematics Teacher and also Vice-principal of GHS who supports Kireet Das for dreaming to take over the Principal Chair of GHS
- Ravi Prakash as Sundar, an alumnus of GHS who feel jealous on Sampath ruins his career later becomes coach for Everglades team.
- Vasu Inturi as Ramesh's father
- Sivannarayana Naripeddi as Varun's father
- Jhansi as Vikas's mother
- Ragini as Gowtham's mother
- Madhumani as Ashish's mother
- Goparaju Ramana as Liaquat Bhai
- Hema as Anjali's colleague
- Vidya Sagar Rachakonda as Umpire

=== Cricket team ===
- Santosh Sobhan as Gowtham
- Sreenivasa Sayee as Siddanth
- Suraj Gontla as Vikas Bhargava
- Farookh as Michel
- Sangeeth Sobhan as Varun
- Vasudev Sastry as Ramesh
- Sai Kiran as Ashish
- Sai Pradeep as Shameem
- Lalith as Rajeender
- Sri Raj as Nissar Ahmed
- Nikhil Saketh as Karthik
- Rohith Ranka as Noel
- Sudhir Kumar as Sanjay
- Bharath Raj as Khaleel

== Home media ==
The film Satellite rights was bagged by Zee Telugu

== Soundtrack ==
Kalyani Malik has composed the original score and soundtracks for the film.

No.	Title	Performer(s)	Length
1.	"Jaago"	Hemachandra
2.	"Idi Adenemo"	Geetha Madhuri, Sri Krishna
3.	"Adugesthe"	Anuradha Palakruthi
4.	"Aetinaavo"	Hemachandra
5.	"Adugesthe" (Male)	Hemachandra
6.	"GHS Yuddhabheri"	Kalyani Malik
