= Rashi Singh =

Indian film actress

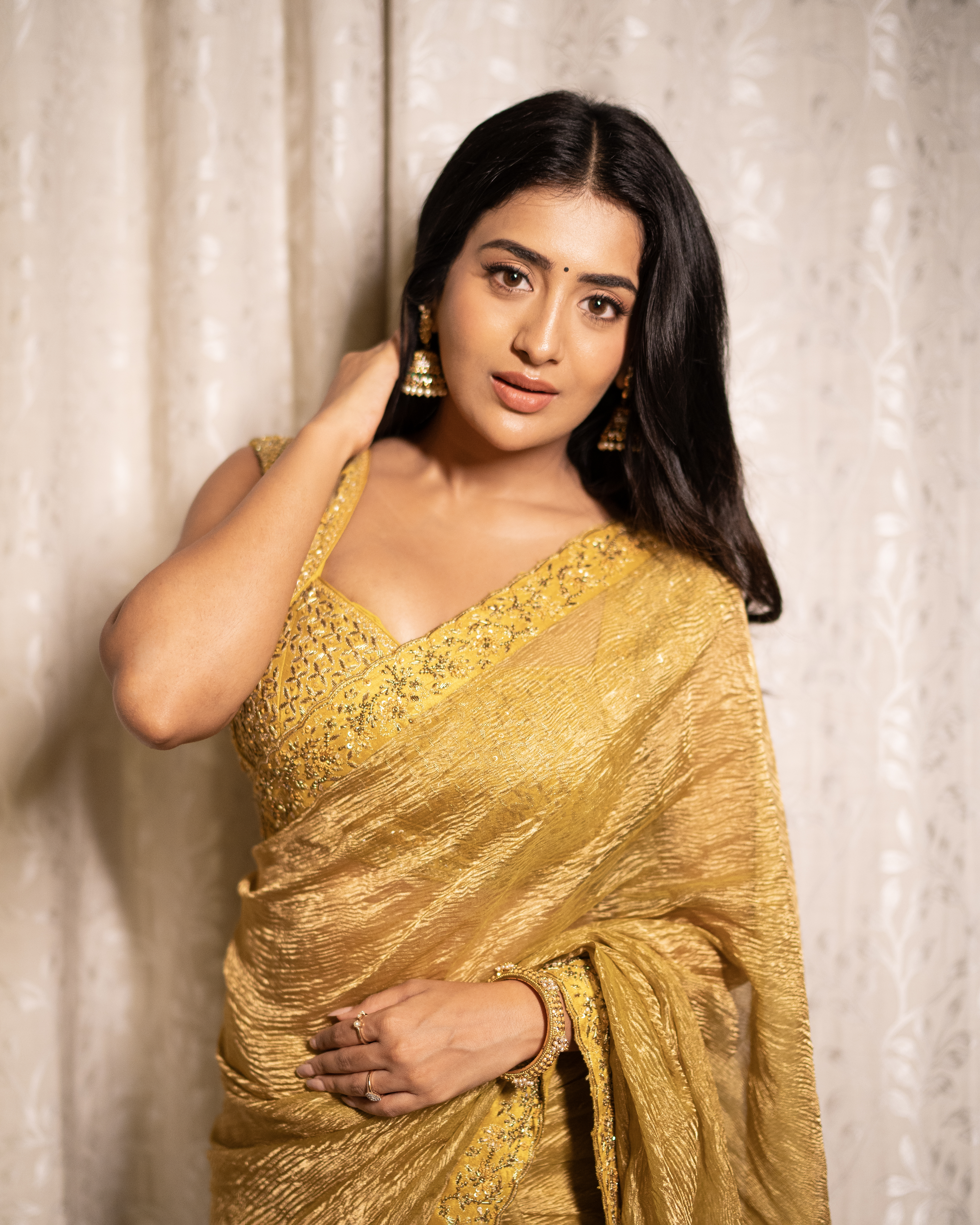
- Occupation: Actress
- Years active: 2021–present

Rashi Singh is an Indian film actress who works in Telugu films.

== Early life ==
Born in Bhilai, Chhattisgarh, Rashi briefly worked as an air hostess, before venturing into films. She debuted in the Telugu film industry through Sashi, opposite Aadi Saikumar, and was paired with Santosh Sobhan, Shiva Kandukuri, and Suhas in her subsequent films.

== Filmography ==
| Year | Title | Role | Ref |
|---|---|---|---|
| 2021 | Sashi | Sunitha | |
| 2023 | Prem Kumar | Netra | |
| 2024 | Bhoothaddam Bhaskar Narayana | Lakshmi | |
| 2024 | Prasanna Vadanam | ACP Vaidehi | |
| 2025 | Blind Spot | Divya | |
| 2025 | Paanch Minar | Khyathi | |
| 2025 | Santhana Prapthirasthu | Shanti | |
| 2026 | Transfer Trimurthulu | Lakshmi | |
| 2026 | Gossip | Ajanta | |
| 2026 | Rambha Urvasi Menaka | Rambha | |

=== Television ===
| Year | Title | Role | Network | Reference |
|---|---|---|---|---|
| 2023 | Papam Pasivadu | Chaaru | Aha | |
| 2025 | 3 Roses (Season -2) | Meghana | Aha | |
