= Sobhan =

Telugu film director (1968–2008)

- Born: 1968; Nalgonda, India
- Died: 6 January 2008 (age 40); Hyderabad, Telangana, India
- Occupations: Film director actor
- Years active: 1990s–2004
- Children: 2; including Santosh and Sangeeth
- Relatives: Chittajalu Lakshmipati (brother)

Chittajalu Sobhan (1968 – 6 January 2008) was an Indian film director and screenwriter who worked in Telugu films. He was best known for his film Varsham (2004).

== Career ==
Sobhan went to Chennai in 1989 to join the film industry. He initially worked for a film called Rowdyism, which was stalled after 10 days of shooting. He then joined Tripuraneni Varaprasad alias Chitti Babu as co-director for Raithu Bharatham. He then joined Ram Gopal Varma as a co-director for Anaganaga Oka Roju. Later, he started his profession as a writer for Krishna Vamsi's film Sindhooram and worked with him for Murari, and also acted in films like Kshana Kshanam and Oka Raju Oka Rani. Later, he directed a few episodes of Malayalam TV serial Navaneetha (2000). During the making of Murari, he was in touch with Mahesh Babu, and that led to the film Bobby. Sobhan was known for his able hand in scripting. He helped many directors during the script sessions of many hit films.

== Death ==
Sobhan died on 6 January 2008, from cardiac arrest, at the age of 40. He was in the middle of narrating a story to Bhumika Chawla, when he complained of chest pain and collapsed. She and her husband, Bharath Thakur, immediately rushed him to Image Hospitals in Madhapur. The doctors declared that he was brought dead. He is survived by his wife, Soujanya, and two sons, Santosh Shoban and Sangeeth Sobhan who are also actors. His elder brother, comedian Lakshmipati, died that same year.

== Filmography ==
Year	Title	Credited as		Notes
Year	Title	Director	Writer	Notes
2001	Murari	No	Dialogues	
2002	Bobby	Yes	Yes	
2004	Varsham	Yes	No	
2004	Naani	No	Dialogues	
2004	Chanti	Yes	No	

As actor

Year	Film	Role	Notes
1991	Kshana Kshanam		Uncredited
1998	Pape Naa Pranam	News Cameraman	Uncredited
2003	Oka Raju Oka Rani	Hanumanthu	
