= Prem Kumar (film) =

- Directed by: Abhishek Maharshi
- Produced by: Shiva Prasad Panneeru
- Starring: Santosh Sobhan; Rashi Singh
- Cinematography: Rampy Nandigam
- Edited by: Garry BH
- Music by: S. Anant Srikar
- Release date: 18 August 2023
- Country: India
- Language: Telugu

Prem Kumar is a 2023 Indian Telugu-language romantic comedy film directed by Abhishek Maharshi and starring Santosh Sobhan and Rashi Singh. The film was released after a two-year delay. The film received mixed reviews from critics.

== Cast ==
- Santosh Sobhan as Prem Kumar
- Rashi Singh as Netra
- Krishna Chaitanya as Roshan
- Ruchitha Sadineni as Angana
- Krishna Teja as Sundara Lingam
- Sudharshan as Daddy
- Ashok Kumar
- Sri Vidya
- Raj Madiraju as Netra's father
- Prabhavathi as Prem Kumar's mother
- Harsha Chemudu as Police officer
- Sai Srujan Pelluri as Roshan's assistant

== Reception ==
The film received mixed reviews from critics.

Professional ratings
Review scores
Source	Rating
The Indian Express	1/5 stars
The Times of India	2.0/5 stars
OTT Play	2.5/5 stars
Cinema Express	2/5 stars

A critic from The Indian Express wrote that "Watching Prem Kumar is a colossal waste of time. Please avoid". A critic from The Times of India wrote that "Overall, Prem Kumar, the film, comes across as a lighthearted entertainer with untapped potential. Santosh Soban's commendable acting and sporadic humour in the film salvage the viewing experience, yet the film's shortcomings in writing and execution hinder it from achieving greatness". A critic from OTTplay wrote that "On the whole, Prem Kumar has an interesting premise and Santosh Soban's performance holds the fort. But it is the weak first half the audience needs to sit through to enjoy the film". Abhilasha Cherukuri of Cinema Express wrote "Prem Kumar is an interesting comedy of errors haemorrhaged by an overly dialogic screenplay."
