= Paanch Minar =

2025 Indian Telugu film by Ram Kadumula

- Theatrical release poster
- Directed by: Ram Kadumula
- Written by: Ram Kadumula
- Produced by: Madhavi; MSM Reddy
- Starring: Raj Tarun; Rashi Singh
- Cinematography: Aditya Javvadi
- Edited by: Prawin Pudi
- Music by: Shekar Chandra
- Production company: Connect Movies
- Release date: 21 November 2025
- Running time: 134 minutes
- Country: India
- Language: Telugu

Paanch Minar (transl. Five minarets) is a 2025 Indian Telugu-language crime comedy film written and directed by Ram Kadumula. The film stars Raj Tarun and Rashi Singh in lead roles.

The film was released on 21 November 2025.

== Plot ==
Krishan Chaitanya “Kittu” is a young man who has studied software engineering but is unable to find a job in his field. Under pressure from his family and his girlfriend's father—who insists that Kittu secure stable employment before approving their marriage—he takes up work as a cab driver. To avoid embarrassment, Kittu lies to everyone, claiming he works as a software engineer. At his company, deaf drivers are paid more, so he pretends to be deaf while on duty to earn extra income.

Kittu drives a taxi purchased from Chotu's garage, which serves as a front for his family's illegal operations. One day, the family discovers that their accountant has stolen a large sum of money. They kill him before he can reveal where he hid it. Chotu later learns that his uncle Murthy was also involved in the theft. Because of their close relationship, Chotu does not confront him publicly but instead demands that he return the money. Although Murthy does not know where the accountant hid it, he agrees and secretly hires two contract killers to murder Chotu.

The two killers arrive in the city and hire Kittu's taxi to take them to Chotu's location. Kittu witnesses the murder but pretends not to have seen anything in order to protect himself. During the return journey, the killers—unaware that Kittu can hear—discuss their plan to retrieve the hidden money and then kill Kittu. Unable to react without revealing his deception, Kittu is forced to continue the ride while looking for a way to escape.

At a remote location, the killers attempt to kill Kittu, but a passing police patrol car interrupts them, forcing them to flee. They are subsequently arrested. Using the information he overheard, Kittu later retrieves the killers’ hidden money. However, the killers escape from police custody and discover that their money is missing. Suspecting Kittu, they go to his house the next day to confront him.

Meanwhile, Chotu's gang—now led by Murthy—learns that the accountant had hidden information about the stolen money inside the car sold to Kittu. They also arrive at Kittu's house. Murthy does not recognize the killers, as he hired them through a broker, and the rest of the gang is unaware of their involvement. A fight breaks out between the two groups, allowing Kittu to escape.

Kittu goes to a police station to report the situation while continuing to pretend to be deaf. However, a corrupt police inspector secretly contacts Murthy and offers to kill both Kittu and the two killers in exchange for a large sum of money. Kittu overhears this conversation and later manages to escape from the station.

Kittu's family is eventually captured by Murthy's gang. The police inspector and the two killers also arrive, leading to a confrontation between all parties. During the chaos, Kittu reveals that Murthy was responsible for hiring the killers to murder Chotu and exposes the inspector's deal with him. This triggers a violent shootout among the gang, the killers, and the police, resulting in the deaths of all involved except Kittu and his family, who manage to escape. The money Kittu had stolen from the killers is destroyed in the fire during the conflict.

A few days later, while at home, Kittu absentmindedly tinkers with a component in his car and accidentally breaks it open. Inside, he discovers a key and a note referring to a bank locker. He goes to the bank, opens the locker, and finds the money that the accountant had originally stolen from Chotu's family.

== Cast ==
- Raj Tarun as Krishan Chaitanya "Kittu"
- Rashi Singh as Khyathi
- Brahmaji as Koteswara Rao, Kittu's father
- Bindu Chandramouli as Kittu’s mother
- Nithin Prasanna as CI Govind Aiyer
- Srinivasa Reddy as SI Sherlock Reddy
- Ajay Ghosh as Murthy, Chotu’s uncle
- Ravi Varma as Chotu, Gangster
- Sudharshan as Sesh, Kittu’s friend
- Sivannarayana Naripeddi as Khyathi’s father
- Aziz Naser as Contract Killer
- Nanda Gopal as Contract Killer
- Jeeva as Chotu’s father
- Fish Venkat as Chotu’s right-hand man
- Laxman Meesala as Murthy’s assistant
- Krishna Teja as Kittu’s friend
- Karri Sonia as Dancer in "Mandu Tera" song

== Music ==
The background score and songs were composed by Shekar Chandra.

Track listing
No.	Title	Lyrics	Singer(s)	Length
1.	"Janu Meri Janu"	Sri Harsha Emani	Vinayak	3:32
2.	"Em Bathukura Naadi"	Anantha Sriram	Dinesh Rudra	3:53
3.	"Mandu Tera"	Kasarla Shyam	Vinayak	3:17

== Release and reception ==
Paanch Minar was released on 21 November 2025.

Suresh Kavirayani of Cinema Express rated the film 3 out of 5 and wrote in his review that, "with a crisp runtime, steady humour, and a decent mix of thrills, it works well as a stress-buster". Ramu Chinthakindhi of Times Now Telugu too gave the same rating and appreciated Raj Tarun's performance. Hindustan Times Telugu noted the screenplay and Raj Tarun's performance.
