= Ram Mohan P. =

Indian film screenwriter, and producer (born 1969)

- Born: 21 May 1969 (age 56)
- Other names: Ram Mohan
- Occupations: Film producer; Screenwriter
- Known for: Telugu Films
- Notable work: Uyyala Jampala (2013)

Ram Mohan Paruvu (born 21 May 1969) is an Indian film screenwriter, producer, and director known for his works in Telugu cinema. He owns the production house Sunshine Cinemas.

== Career ==
The first film under the Sunshine Cinemas banner is Ram's 2013 film Uyyala Jampala.

== Filmography ==
Year	Title	Director	Producer	Writer
2008	Ashta Chamma		Yes	
2011	Golconda High School		Yes	
2013	Uyyala Jampala		Yes	Yes
2015	Thanu Nenu	Yes	Yes	
2016	Soggade Chinni Nayana			Story
2016	Pittagoda		Yes	

== Personal life ==
His brother Harimohan Paruvu is an English writer.

=== Awards and nominations ===
- 2014, 'Best Film' nomination by Telugu Film Industry's Filmfare Awards South for Uyyala Jampala (2013).
- 2009, 'Best Film' nomination by Telugu Film Industry's Filmfare Awards South for Ashta Chamma (2008).
