= Mahanubhavudu =

2017 film by Maruthi

- Film poster
- Directed by: Maruthi
- Written by: Maruthi
- Produced by: V. Vamsi Krishna Reddy; Pramod Uppalapati; Sreenivasa Kumar Naidu (SKN)
- Starring: Sharwanand; Mehreen Pirzada
- Cinematography: Nizar Shafi
- Edited by: Kotagiri Venkateswara Rao
- Music by: S. Thaman
- Production company: UV Creations
- Release date: 29 September 2017
- Running time: 151 minutes
- Country: India
- Language: Telugu
- Budget: ₹10 crore
- Box office: est. ₹45.3 crore

Mahanubhavudu (transl. 'Great Person') is a 2017 Indian Telugu-language romantic comedy film written and directed by Maruthi. It features Sharwanand and Mehreen Pirzada in the lead roles.

The film's principal photography commenced on 7 March 2017 and was wrapped on 2 September 2017. It had a worldwide release on 29 September 2017. The movie received positive reviews and was a commercial blockbuster.

The film was remade in Odia in 2019 as Ajab Sanju Ra Gajab Love starring Babushan.

== Plot ==
Anand (Sharwanand) is a young man with obsessive–compulsive disorder and is very particular about cleanliness. Since he is a mysophobiac, he does not even touch other humans. Since hospitals contain infectious patients, he has an unrealistic fear of hospitals too. One day, he meets Meghana (Mehreen Pirzada) after an incident involving a man spitting chewing gum on her shoe. He falls in love with her after she tells the man the importance of cleanliness. She later becomes his partner for a company project and eventually falls for him too. She decides to introduce Anand to her father Ramaraju (Nassar), who has been waiting for his daughter to get married.

Although Ramaraju rejects Anand at first due to his eccentricities, Anand saves Ramaraju's stolen bag from a bunch of goons, and he accepts him as his son-in-law. However, at that time, Ramaraju suffers a heart attack and begins vomiting blood onto Anand, who drives him to the hospital along with Meghana. While driving, Anand begins to recollect the incident again and again and is nauseated. Unable to hold his vomit, he stops the car by the road and gets down the car to vomit by the road. He then tells Meghana that he cannot take her father to the hospital as he is nauseous, which shocks her. Meghana takes her father to the hospital instead and breaks up with Anand because of his insistence on things being clean, as well as for his selfishness.

In the later half, Anand goes to Meghana's village, as she did not tell her father about their breakup. In their village, he experiences a lot of things which brings out the anger and mysophobia in him, but he controls his fears and stays for Meghana. In the end, he is pulled into a fight in the mud to save the village and get Meghana's trust, which he wins but falls down as soon as the fight is over. The doctor reveals that he just had an infection due to fighting in the mud.

In the end, Anand is seen asking his son, who shares the same traits of his OCD, to not be obsessive but to enjoy life, and they both are seen playing in the rain.

== Cast ==
- Sharwanand as Anand
- Mehreen Pirzada as Meghana
- Nassar as Ramaraju, Meghana's father
- Vennela Kishore as Kishore
- Anand Ramaraju
- Kalyani Natarajan as Anand's mother
- Bhadram as Jiddesh
- Himaja as Meghana's friend
- Raghu Babu as Doctor
- Mahadevan as Bhupathi
- Vadlamani Srinivas as Bhupathi's brother
- Ragini
- Duvvasi Mohan
- Bhanushree
- Venu Yeldandi
- Maruthi in a cameo appearance in song Bhamalu Bhamalu

== Soundtrack ==
Mahanubhavudu

Film score by S. Thaman
- Released: 16 September 2017
- Recorded: 2017
- Genre: Soundtrack
- Length: 23:33
- Labels: Mango Music, Saregama
- Producer: S. Thaman

S. Thaman chronology
Goutham Nanda (2017)	Mahanubhavudu (2017)	Raju Gari Gadhi 2 (2017)

The music was composed by S. Thaman. The soundtrack was released by Mango Music.

No.	Title	Lyrics	Singer(s)	Length
1.	"Rendu Kallu"	Krishna Kanth	Armaan Malik	3:34
2.	"Mahanubhavudu"	Krishna Kanth	M. M. Manasi, Geetha Madhuri	4:25
3.	"Kiss Me Baby"	Krishna Kanth	S. Thaman, Manisha Eerabathini	3:35
4.	"My Love Is Back"	Krishna Kanth	Rahul Nambiar	4:25
5.	"Bammalu Bammalluuu"	Bhaskarbatla	Nakash Aziz	3:30
6.	"Eppudainna"	Sirivennela Seetharama Sastry	Shweta Pandit, Rita Thyagarajan	4:04
Total length:				23:33
