= 35 Chinna Katha Kaadu =

2024 Indian Telugu-language film by Nanda Kishore Emani

- Theatrical release poster
- Directed by: Nanda Kishore Emani
- Written by: Prashanth Vignesh Amaravadhi; Nanda Kishore Emani
- Produced by: Srujan Yarabolu; Siddharth Rallapalli
- Starring: Nivetha Thomas; Arundev Pothula; Vishwadev Rachakonda; Priyadarshi Pulikonda
- Cinematography: Niketh Bommi
- Edited by: T. C. Prasanna
- Music by: Vivek Sagar
- Production companies: S Originals; Waltair Productions
- Distributed by: Suresh Productions
- Release date: 6 September 2024
- Country: India
- Language: Telugu
- Box office: ₹5.90 crore

35 Chinna Katha Kaadu (transl. 35 Not a small story) is a 2024 Indian Telugu-language comedy drama film co-written and directed by Nanda Kishore Emani in his directorial debut. The film features Nivetha Thomas, Arundev Pothula, Vishwadev Rachakonda and Priyadarshi Pulikonda in lead roles. The film was released on 6 September 2024 to positive reviews from critics.

Vivek Sagar composed the music, T. C. Prasanna is the editor and Niketh Bommi handled the cinematography. It was featured at the 55th International Film Festival of India in the Indian Panorama section. Nivetha Thomas won the Filmfare Award for Best Actress – Telugu. At the 72nd National Film Awards 2024, the film won the Best Children's Film, and Best Child Artist.

== Plot ==
The story is set in a traditional Telugu Brahmin household in Tirupati, centered around Saraswati, a devoted homemaker; her husband Prasad, who works as a bus conductor with the TTD; and their two children, Arun and Varun, studying in the TTD-sponsored school. Together, they lead a simple yet beautiful middle-class life in the TTD employee quarters.

Arun, the elder of the sons, is curious by nature. He likes to ask questions and learn the why behind everything. His only question nobody seems to know the answer to: how can zero, a number with no value, increase the value of another number when placed to its right? No math teacher has been able to answer this question. Despite Arun struggling with maths in school and getting zeros on exams, he gets promoted to the 6th grade. This worries Prasad. Arun has a best friend called Pavan who is a topper in the class; however, their friendship has not been affected by the difference in their marks in the class. Pavan is the only loyal friend to Arun in the whole class.

Meanwhile, Saraswati unexpectedly meets Sarada, a multi-talented teacher, journalist, etc., who came to visit Lord Venkateswara Swamy temple and to stay for a while in Tirupati.

At the same time, a new maths teacher named Chanakya Varma joins Arun and Varun's school. He is arrogant and strict, but appears to care for the futures of his students. Varma calls them by their Mathematics marks instead of their names. "Zero" Arun, who continuously pesters and challenges Varma with his questions, irritates Varma. Unable to answer Arun's questions, he tries disciplining him, which in turn makes Arun rebellious. This makes Varma suggest to Pavan's father that he shift Pavan to a residential school in Nellore, which shatters Arun.

Later, Varma suggests to the principal, Buchi Reddy, to demote Arun to the 5th grade in order to get him to work on his maths foundation. Prasad approves it, but this enrages Saraswati. Arun has no options left and goes back to the 5th grade along with his brother Varun. In the class, all of the students except Varun decide not to support Arun due to their fear of Varma.

Arun realizes this and feels insecure and lonely. Then a new student enters the school called Kiranmayee "Kiran”. She is Principal Buchi Reddy's granddaughter and gets special treatment from the management, especially from Varma. She joins the 5th grade where Arun studies and begins a friendship with him despite the other students’ warnings to boycott him from the class. Kiran has a maturity beyond her age, and she slowly becomes Arun’s close friend and frequently visits his home. This helps Arun return to his normal self, which Saraswati notices, and it makes her happy.

One day, their school announces they will go on a picnic. Varma announces that he will take his classes during free time to a picnic spot. The whole class, including Kiran, does not want Varma to come on the picnic.

Then, Arun steals Varma's spectacles and destroys them. Without them, Varma can't see, which leads to an accident. Meanwhile, during the picnic, Arun confesses to Kiran that he succeeded in making Varma not come with them. One of the other students hears this and tattles on him to Varma, which leads to a complaint against Arun to suspend him for the rest of the academic year.

Buchi Reddy informs Arun’s parents of the incident. After finding out about everything, Prasad feels ashamed and slaps Arun for the first time. Even Saraswati also scolds him for his mistake. This leads Arun to feel abandoned by his family and friends, and he subsequently runs away from home. Varun alerts their parents that Arun ran away, and his parents search for him.

Luckily, Arun is found by Sarada on a train while she is traveling, and Arun reaches home safely, with Prasad and Saraswati thanking her for the favour. The family reconciles later, and Prasad decides that Arun will be enrolled in Vedic school, and at the same time Kiran and Varun lie to Principal Buchi Reddy that Arun had broken Varma’s glasses for the sake of the whole class and complain about Varma.

Buchi Reddy, however, does not have any intention of suspending Arun; he lied to make Arun’s parents discipline him. After hearing his granddaughter’s confession, he asks the class to show support for Arun, and the majority of the class does, including Kiran. Later, in a conversation with his pune, he states that he hopes Varma realizes his mistake.

Prasad tells Arun, Varun, and Saraswati of his decision to switch Arun’s school, and the trio opposes his decision, but Prasad tries to implement his decision authoritatively. Then Saraswati sends her sons to school, unknown to Prasad. After discovering this, Prasad challenges Saraswati to make Arun pass his exam, but until then he won't talk to her. Meanwhile, at the school, Kiran and Varun argue in favour of canceling Arun’s suspension. Then Principal Buchi Reddy comes to the class along with Varma and Arun.

Buchi Reddy asks for the opinions of the class, and to Arun’s surprise, the majority of the class supports him, bruising Varma’s ego. Buchi Reddy feels proud of the kids for their support of Arun in class.

With his ego hit, Varma challenges Arun publicly to score 35 marks (the passing grade) in the 5th grade annual exam, or else Arun will be suspended from the school, which Buchi Reddy approves, though with a heavy heart.

However, Arun confesses that he only came to thank Kiran for standing up for him, and he announces that he won't come to school from the next day.

Later, Arun tells his mother everything that happened, and the answer to Arun’s longstanding question comes to her mind, i.e., “how can a zero next to a 1 increase its value?” This satisfies Arun.

After hearing this conversation, Prasad says Saraswati can't keep up with the math and says "not a small story" (Chinna Katha Kaadhu), discouraging her.

Saraswati takes this as a challenge and swears that she will get her son to pass the exam at any cost in 69 days. Later, Saraswati manages to get Arun back into school with the permission of the principal, which makes Kiran and Varun happy.

Later, the whole class (led by Kiran) decides to help Arun pass his exam, and they start helping Arun prepare for the exam in various ways. Meanwhile, Saraswati approaches Sarada for help with the preparation for Arun's exam, and Sarada agrees with the condition that Saraswati needs to tutor her son by herself and Sarada will guide Saraswati in Mathematics. Having failed 10th grade and stopped studying, she is not confident but agrees.

Saraswati starts her studies by learning basic English, and then finishes Mathematics from 1st class to 5th class. Saraswati is grasping the concepts quickly and starts teaching maths to her son, incorporating life skills and real-life experience, making it easy for Arun to grasp. Prasad supports his wife indirectly, though he is still not talking to her.

The mother and the son duo’s hard work is paying off, and Varma notices Arun's improvement in Maths and comes to appreciate Saraswati. He visits their home, but after discovering that she failed in 10th grade, Varma belittles her teaching style. Saraswati requests Varma to stop calling Arun "Zero", so he calls Arun "Sunna" (Zero in Telugu) and shows disregard for Saraswati’s request, which makes her angry. Later, in a private talk with Principal Buchi Reddy, Buchi Reddy questions Varma about his thinking and writing of the final exam paper, which is actually a very high level for a normal 5th-grade student, stating it looks like he is taking revenge on the whole 5th grade for standing against him. But Varma arrogantly backs himself up and claims that "we don’t need to be kind to students, but we need to hold the expectation that their future will be bright".

After completing the language exam, the next day is the maths exam. The Principal calls Saraswati and informs her that the exam will be tough, so he advises her to prepare for the entire year’s syllabus to show up on the exam and not to focus solely on the “important” chapters. Hearing this, Arun is discouraged and decides he will fail in the exam. However, Saraswati boosts her son's confidence and assures him that they will pass at any cost.

The next day, while going to the exam, Prasad offers to drop Arun at school, but on the way they have an accident. On the way to the hospital, Arun realizes that they are at the school and decides to jump out and go to the exam hall, but the worried Prasad decides to go to the hospital, ignoring Arun's pleadings. Suddenly Arun escapes from his father and reaches the exam hall, hiding his physical pain. However, Varma, who is invigilating the exam, doesn’t allow Arun to write the exam. All the students stop Varma, and Arun enters the class and successfully takes the question paper and begins the exam by locking the teachers out. Meanwhile, Prasad and Buchi Reddy come to the room tries to open the door. Worried, Prasad pleads for his son to come out, and Buchi Reddy reveals that regardless of whether he passes or fails, he will be promoted to 7th grade. But Arun refuses to be promoted without actually passing and tries to focus on his exam. However, the adults successfully open the door and interrupt Arun's exam to take him to the hospital by force.

Later, the results of the exam are declared, and Prasad comes home with Arun and Varun's marks card. At first, Arun thought he failed the exam and cried in his mother's arms. Saraswati tries to cheer him up. Then Prasad reveals that Arun got exactly 35 marks on the exam and got good scores in the remaining subjects. Due to this, the family is happy, and Prasad speaks to Saraswati after so many days, which makes her emotional. Then Saraswati surprises Prasad by showing him her new progress report, displaying that she had passed 10th grade, which stuns everyone.

Suddenly, Chanakya Varma pays a visit to their home and calls Arun by his full name, "Sripathi Panditharadhyula Siva Shanmuka Venkata Satya Sai Arun Sarma." From this, we understand that he has changed his attitude towards Saraswati and her teaching style and indirectly apologizes to Saraswati for belittling her. Then Varma surprises Arun and brings Pavan along with him, which makes Arun very happy. Finally, the film ends with Prasad and Saraswati welcoming Chanakya Varma warmly into their home.

In the end credits scene, it is revealed that through Sarada’s guidance, Saraswati realises her goal to become a Maths teacher and helps students playfully learn maths.

== Cast ==
- Nivetha Thomas as Sripathi Panditharadhyula Venkata Padma Kamala Kantha Pranava Manjula Bala Saraswati
- Arundev Pothula as Sripathi Panditharadhyula Siva Shanmuka Venkata Satya Sai Arun Sarma
- Vishwadev Rachakonda as Sripathi Panditharadhyula Venkata Pavana Subramanya Sathya Prasad
- Priyadarshi Pulikonda as Chanakya Varma, M.A.
- Gautami as Sarada
- K. Bhagyaraj as Principal Bucchi Reddy
- Abhay Shankar as Sripathi Panditharadhyula Varun Sarma
- Ananya as Kiranmayee "Kiran"
- Krishna Teja as "Prasadams, Darsanam and Rooms"(PDR) Murthy, Arun and Varun's Maternal Uncle, Saraswati's Elder Brother, and Prasad's Brother in Law.

== Production ==
The film was produced by Srujan Yarabolu and Siddharth Rallapally under the banners of Suresh Productions, S Originals, and Waltair Productions. The film's budget was under ₹10 crore. The film's story is set in Tirupati. The cast, including Nivetha Thomas, underwent training from the dialect coach and co-writer of the film Prashanth Vignesh, in the local Telugu dialect, covering phonetics and lexical aspects, as well as its distinct Tamil influences. Nivetha underwent physical transformation, gaining weight, to portray the character Saraswati in the film.

The title of the film was unveiled on 25 June 2024. The cinematography was by Niketh Bommi, while the editing was handled by T. C. Prasanna. The film received a U certificate from the Central Board of Film Certification.

== Music ==
The background score and soundtrack were composed by Vivek Sagar.

35 Chinna Katha Kaadu

Soundtrack album by Vivek Sagar
- Released: 10 October 2024
- Recorded: 2024
- Genre: Feature film soundtrack
- Length: 26:10
- Language: Telugu
- Label: Aditya Music
- Producer: Vivek Sagar

Vivek Sagar chronology
Darling (2024)	35 Chinna Katha Kaadu (2024)	Swag (2024)
External audio
- Official Audio Jukebox on YouTube

Track listing
No.	Title	Lyrics	Singer(s)	Length
1.	"Sayyare Sayya"	Kittu Vissapragada	Karthik	4:33
2.	"Chinna Idi Vintha Lokam"	Bharadwaj Gali	Vijay Prakash	3:53
3.	"Neeli Meghamulalo"	Bharadwaj Gali	Prithvi Harish	4:52
4.	"Taaralainaa Cheraalante"	Bharadwaj Gali	Mangli, Priyanka Harish (slokam)
5.	"Bhashalona Rayaleni Bhavame"	Kittu Vissapragada	Vivek Sagar
6.	"Chinna Kadha Kaadey"	Team 35	Ritesh G Rao, Sindhuja Srinivasan

== Release ==
The film was initially scheduled to release on 15 August 2024, but was released on 6 September 2024, with limited paid premieres on 5 September 2024. Post-theatrical digital streaming rights were acquired by Aha and announced the premiere date to be 27 September 2024, but was later released on 2 October 2024. Television satellite rights were acquired by Zee Telugu, and was premiered on 22 December 2024, coinciding with National Mathematics Day. It was premiered at the 55th International Film Festival of India in November 2024.

The Tamil version titled 35 Chinna Vishayam Illa was released on 25 December 2024.

== Reception ==
Aditya Devulapally of The New Indian Express gave a rating of 4 out of 5 and, cited the film as a "heartfelt love letter to childhood curiosity" with extended praise to the direction, screenplay and the music. Eenadu gave a positive review with particular praise to screenplay, dialogues, Nanda Kishore Emani's work and the performances of the lead cast. Sangeetha Devi Dundoo of The Hindu called it "an uplifting tale of triumph" while praising performance of Nivetha Thomas and the child actors. Jalapathy Gudelli of Telugucinema.com particularly praised the performance of Nivetha Thomas, Vivek Sagar's music and Nanda Kishore Emani's screenplay, and storytelling.

Sruthi Kuruganti of Telangana Today stated in her review that, "The charm of 35 – Chinna Katha Kaadu lies in its simplicity and humanism. The subtle interplay between mathematics and human relationships creates a layered story that celebrates the beauty of questioning and learning, both inside and outside the classroom". Calling Nivetha Thomas's performance as "stellar", Avad Mohammad of OTTPlay praised the dialogues and background score. He further stated, "A lot of detailing has gone when it comes to locations, costumes, and sets. All this was showcased so well and became a character in the film".

== Accolades ==
Award (Note: Awards, festivals and organizations are in alphabetical order.)	Date of ceremony (Note: Date is linked to the article about the awards held that year, wherever possible.)	Category	Recipient(s)	Result	Ref.
Filmfare Awards South	21 February 2026	Best Film – Telugu	Srujan Yarabolu and Siddharth Rallapalli	Nominated	
Filmfare Awards South	21 February 2026	Best Director – Telugu	Nanda Kishore Emani	Nominated	
Filmfare Awards South	21 February 2026	Best Actress – Telugu	Nivetha Thomas	Won	
International Film Festival of India	28 November 2024	Best Debut Film of a Director	Nanda Kishore Emani	Nominated	
South Indian International Movie Awards	5 September 2025	Best Actress – Telugu	Nivetha Thomas	Nominated	
South Indian International Movie Awards	5 September 2025	Best Debut Director – Telugu	Nanda Kishore Emani	Won	
National Film Awards	72nd National Film Awards - September 2026	Best Children's Film	Producer: S Originals and Waltair Productions; Director: Nanda Kishore Emani	Won	
National Film Awards	72nd National Film Awards - September 2026	Best Child Artist	Arundev Pothula	Won	
Telangana Gaddar Film Awards	14 June 2025	Best Leading Actress	Nivetha Thomas	Won	
