= Sudharshan =

Telugu actor

- Born: Sudharshan Reddy
- Other names: Sudarshan, Nellore Sudarshan
- Years active: 2014–present

Sudharshan Reddy is an Indian actor who works in Telugu films. He is known for his Nellore dialect in films.

== Career ==
Sudharshan came to Hyderabad for his IELTS exam and emigrate to the United Kingdom. His friend, Srikanth N. Reddy, was making a short film, and he told him about his experience in a business. He used the money he reserved for his exam to fund the short comedy film, which was titled Americaku Vellalante Daaredhi. After the short film's success on YouTube, he had a few "blink-and-miss" appearances in a few films before getting recognised for his negative role in Kumari 21F (2015). By May 2016, he has worked in over twenty-two films. He won the SIIMA Award for Best Comedian – Telugu for Ek Mini Katha (2021). Regarding his performance in Like, Share & Subscribe (2022), a critic called him a "hoot".

== Filmography ==
Year	Title	Role	Notes
2014	Run Raja Run	Bus conductor	
2015	Pataas	GK's supporter	
2015	Dohchay	Chandu's friend	
2015	Raju Gari Gadhi	Youngster	
2015	Kumari 21F	Sollu Srinu	
2016	Tuntari	Raju's friend	
2016	Antham	Kalyan Krishna's friend	
2016	Chuttalabbai	Babji's friend	
2016	Eedu Gold Ehe	Bangarraju's friend	
2016	Ekkadiki Pothavu Chinnavada	Arjun's friend	
2017	Dwaraka	Oscar	
2017	Kittu Unnadu Jagratha	Kittu's friend	
2017	Lanka		
2017	Keshava		
2017	Kaadhali	Kranti's friend	
2017	Ninnu Kori	Uma's friend	
2017	Darsakudu	Director's assistant	
2018	Chalo		
2018	Krishnarjuna Yudham		
2018	Vijetha		
2018	Nannu Dochukunduvate		
2018	Savyasachi	Bose	
2019	Majili	Poorna's friend	
2019	Chitralahari	Vijay's friend	
2019	Seven	Karthik's coworker	
2019	Rajdooth	Sanjay's friend	
2019	Nivaasi	Vivaan's friend	
2019	Ranarangam	Deva's gang member	
2019	Marshal	Abhi's friend	
2020	Entha Manchivaadavuraa	Balu's friend	
2020	Neevalle Nenunna	Surya's friend	
2020	Bheeshma	Employee	
2020	Solo Brathuke So Better	Virat's friend	
2021	Alludu Adhurs	DCP's assistant	
2021	Cycle	Vankayalu's friend	
2021	A1 Express	Rao Ramesh's assistant	
2021	Sashi	Raj's friend	
2021	Ek Mini Katha	Darshan	Won–SIIMA Award for Best Comedian – Telugu
2021	Vivaha Bhojanambu	Mahesh's friend	
2021	Manchi Rojulochaie	Nellore Bammardhi	
2021	Pushpaka Vimanam	Marriage videographer	
2021	Anubhavinchu Raja		
2022	Aadavallu Meeku Johaarlu	Tomato seller	
2022	Ghani	Ghani's friend	
2022	Saakini Daakini	Pickpocket	
2022	Boyfriend for Hire	Arjun's friend	
2022	Like, Share & Subscribe	Jack Daniels	
2022	Repeat	Kishore	
2022	Nenevaru	Ajay	
2023	Geeta Sakshigaa		
2023	Kalyanamasthu		
2023	#MenToo	Jack Daniel	
2023	Samajavaragamana	Box Office Baadshah	
2023	Bhaag Saale	Kittu	
2023	Prem Kumar	Daddy	
2023	Guns Trance Action	Surya	
2023	Rules Ranjann	Ranjan's friend	
2023	Aadikeshava	Sudharshan	
2024	Inti No. 13		
2024	Mr. Bachchan	A1 Orchestra member	
2024	Uruku Patela	Dr. Chirag	
2024	Manamey	Vikram's friend	
2025	Neeli Megha Shyama	Shyam's friend	
2025	Game Changer	Ram's friend	
2025	Ramam Raghavam	Raghunath	
2025	Sri Sri Sri Raja Vaaru	Safar	
2025	Kishkindhapuri	Sumith	
2025	Mithra Mandali	Tea Stall Customer	
2025	Paanch Minar		
2025	Mass Jathara		
2026	Nari Nari Naduma Murari	Jackie	
2026	Mrithyunjay	Anji	
2026	Hey Balwanth	Banka	

=== Television ===
Year	Title	Role	Network
2022	Maa Neella Tank	Gopal	ZEE5
