= Kalyanam Kamaneeyam (film) =

2023 film directed by Anil Kumar Aalla

- Directed by: Anil Kumar Aalla
- Written by: Anil Kumar Aalla
- Produced by: UV Concepts
- Starring: Santosh Sobhan; Priya Bhavani Shankar
- Cinematography: Karthik Gattamneni
- Edited by: Satya G.
- Music by: Shravan Bharadwaj
- Production company: UV Concepts
- Release date: 14 January 2023
- Country: India
- Language: Telugu
- Box office: ₹7.21 crores

Kalyanam Kamaneeyam is a 2023 Indian Telugu-language romantic comedy family drama film written and directed by debutant Anil Kumar Aalla. It is produced by UV Concepts, a subsidiary of UV Creations. It features Santosh Sobhan and Priya Bhavani Shankar (in her Telugu debut) in the lead roles.

Kalyanam Kamaneeyam was released on 14 January 2023 and became available for streaming on Aha on 10 February 2023.

== Plot ==
Shiva is an engineering graduate and is jobless. He's in love with Shruti, a software developer in a reputed firm. He confronts his father that he wants to marry her. Initially thinking it as a joke, he later realizes that his son is serious about it and the family goes to fix an alliance. Shiva's father doesn't want him to marry Shruti as he's unemployed. Shruti's father talks to him in private and tells him that her mother has pancreatic cancer and will not survive for more than an year, which is why he wants her mother to see Shruti get married. Shiva's father agrees. They marry and start a new life.

In the initial days of their marriage life, Shiva and Shruti are totally happy and loving. One day, Shruti sees a notice that her company has some job openings and asks Shiva to apply for it. He does it and through Shruti, he gets called for an interview. He performs well and the interviewer, Chari, is impressed thus, clearing Shiva for on-boarding. While Chari is on his way to submit the new recruitment files, he's stopped by the assistant manager, Bhushan, who lusts for Shruti and tears Shiva's documents. He promises Chari an on-site job in the US and asks him not to recruit Shiva. When the CEO asks Chari about the new recruits, he deliberately insults Shiva in front of Shruti. Disturbed, she returns home angry and screams at Shiva for not behaving responsibly and also for not getting the job. He gets hurt and consumes alcohol with his friend and is booked by the police for drunk driving. The next day, Shruti bails him out at the police station. Meanwhile, Shruti receives vulgar texts from an unknown number and with the help of her friend, she learns that it is Bhushan. She warns him not to repeat it. Nevertheless, Bhushan remains the same.

A few days later, Shruti's friend tells her to ask Shiva to go to a consultancy firm that promises a respectable job in some company. Shruti asks Shiva to do so and he does it but, the consultancy demands an ₹ 10,00,000 for the job. He tells this to Shruti and she takes loan from a bank and asks Shiva to collect the money and pay the consultancy. After he withdraws money from the bank, he gets robbed. He chases after the thief but in vain. He is scared to tell this to Shruti and so decides to work as a cab driver that his friend suggests to pay off the loan. To hide the truth from Shruti, he gets a fake ID card and offer letter from the same company his friend works in. Shruti is impressed and is happy for Shiva. Shiva drops her at the office everyday and pretends to go to his office only to work as a cab driver. One day, a man, Giri, takes his cab and tells that he has a telephonic interview. He receives the call during the cab ride and asks Shiva to answer the call as he isn't confident. Shiva takes the interview pretending to be Giri and does his best thus, clearing Giri's interview. They celebrate and he gets a call from Shruti that she's at his office. He rushes to his friend's office and asks him to manage Shruti somehow till he reaches. He comes just in time and they share a tender moment.

The next day, Bhushan asks Shruti work overtime via Chari. She does it, having no other go. She returns home tired and disturbed. Shiva goes through her phone and sees Bhushan's indecent messages. He immediately rushes to find him and thrashes him. He also warns him to leave Shruti alone. In order to take revenge, Bhushan hires goons to follow Shiva and beat him up. They call Bhushan and inform him that he is working as a cab driver. Bhushan decides to reveal this to Shruti. He arranges a team meeting and presents Shiva and his cab driver, enraging Shruti. She confronts him and parts ways with him telling him that she couldn't live with him even for one year.

A few days later, Shiva informs Shruti that her mother died. They attend the funeral and later, her father starts consuming alcohol again after many years. When confronted, he tells her how her mother was the only supportive person throughout his life even when he had nothing and lost millions in business. He also tells her that before calling Shiva's family for the alliance, he talked to Shiva about their marriage. Shiva initially refused to marry her as he was jobless and feels that he needs to be responsible to get married. When Shruti's father tells him that her mother has little time to live, he immediately agrees and understands the pain of her father which makes her father realize his worth as a person.

Shruti feels bad for misunderstood Shiva and goes to him. Meanwhile, the on-site job that Bhushan promised Chari is given to a girl under Bhushan. Chari confronts Bhushan about this and he slaps him during the argument.

On her way to Shiva, Shruti receives a call from Chari telling her everything that happened with Shiva's recruitment at their office and also about the thrashing Shiva gave to Bhushan. She feels immense regret and apologizes to Shiva and they reconcile. Shruti returns to her office and slaps Bhushan twice for what he has done. She leaves the job and tells Shiva that they both will start job-hunting from the next day.

A few days later, Shiva goes for an interview. He is called by the CEO to his cabin. There, he finds Giri in the CEO position of that company. When asked how he landed there, Giri tells him that his father-in-law has asked Giri to get a software job just to prove his talent so that he can hand over his company to him which he did get because of Shiva's help the other day. Giri offers Shiva a good position in his company. Shiva and Shruthi live happily ever after.

== Cast ==
- Santosh Sobhan as Shiva
- Priya Bhavani Shankar as Shruti
- Devi Prasad as Shruti's father
- Pavitra Lokesh as Shruti's mother
- Kedar Shankar as Shiva's father
- Satyam Rajesh as Bhushan, Shruti's manager
- Saptagiri as Giri
- Rupa Lakshmi
- Saddham as Koushik

== Production ==
Santosh Sobhan and Priya Bhavani Shankar play the lead roles. It was shot by Karthik Gattamneni.

== Music ==
The music rights of the film are owned by Aditya Music. Shravan Bharadwaj composed the music and background score for the film.
