= Vishwadev Rachakonda =

Indian actor

- Born: Visakhapatnam, Andhra Pradesh, India
- Occupation: Actor
- Years active: 2016–present
- Relatives: Rachakonda Viswanatha Sastry (grandfather)

Vishwadev Rachakonda is an Indian actor who appears in Telugu films. He has debuted with Pittagoda (2016) and got his breakthrough with 35 Chinna Katha Kaadu (2024).

== Early life and career ==
Vishwadev Rachakonda was born in Visakhapatnam, India. He is the grandson of popular writer Rachakonda Viswanatha Sastry. He had graduated in mechanical engineering and later worked in Pune. After attending the audition, he was selected for working in Pittagoda (2016), his debut production. During an interview with Cinema Express, Vishwadev told that alongside acting, he was also involved in production, scripting and others. He has debuted as producer with Pareshan (2023), along with his Siddharth Rallapalli of Waltair Productions. His breakthrough film was 35 Chinna Katha Kaadu (2024), in which his performance was praised and received widespread acclaim from the audience.

== Filmography ==
- All films are in Telugu, unless otherwise noted.

Year	Title	Role	Notes	Ref.
2016	Pittagoda	Tippu		
2017	Chalthe Chalthe	Santosh		
2021	Net	Ranjith		
2024	Kismat	Kiran		
2024	35 Chinna Katha Kaadu	Prasad		
2024	Mechanic Rocky	Sekhar		
2025	Neeli Megha Shyama	Shyam		
2025	2026	Cheekatilo	Amar	
2026	Dark Chocolate	Yagna		

=== As producer ===
Year	Title
2023	Pareshan
2024	Double Engine
2024	35 – Chinna Katha Kaadu
2026	Dark Chocolate
