= Hey Balwanth =

- Theatrical release poster
- Directed by: Gopi Atchara
- Screenplay by: Gopi Atchara
- Story by: Shanmukha Prashanth
- Produced by: B. Narendra Reddy
- Starring: Suhas; Shivani Nagaram; Naresh
- Cinematography: Mahi Reddy Pandugula
- Edited by: Viplav Nyshadam
- Music by: Vivek Sagar
- Production company: Trishul Visionary Studios
- Distributed by: BV Works; Vamsi Nandipati Entertainments
- Release date: 20 February 2026
- Running time: 134 minutes
- Country: India
- Language: Telugu
- Box office: ₹9.25 crore

Hey Balwanth (internationally released as Hey Bhagawan) is a 2026 Indian Telugu-language comedy drama film co-written and directed by Gopi Atchara, in his directorial debut. The film stars Suhas, Shivani Nagaram, and Naresh. Produced by B. Narendra Reddy under the banner of Trishul Visionary Studios, the film was released theatrically on 20 February 2026 to mixed reviews from critics and audiences and emerged as a commercial failure at the box office, grossing over only ₹9.25 crore globally.

== Plot ==
Krishna (Suhas) is a Guntur-based postgraduate who idolizes his father, Rao Balwanth (VK Naresh). Though Krishna wants to join the family business, Balwanth refuses and encourages him to work elsewhere. Krishna eventually joins an NGO run by Mithra (Shivani Nagaram) and the two fall in love.

When Balwanth suffers a heart attack, Krishna takes over the family’s operations and discovers "Balwanth Lodge" is a front for a brothel. Distraught by the discovery, Krishna attempts to sell the property while hiding the truth from the idealistic Mithra. He and his friend Banka (Sudharshan) pretend the lodge is a "nature cure center" to maintain the deception.

The situation escalates when Mithra’s grandfather (Babu Mohan) was found dead at the lodge, drawing the attention of local political rivals Durga Rao (Ajay Ghosh) and Mithra’s father PVB (Harsha Vardhan). Further problems arise when Durga Rao’s son Yuvan (Vennela Kishore) falls in love and wishes to marry a prostitute Champa (Sravanthi Chokkarapu) who works in that lodge. After a series of confrontations, Balwanth reveals the personal sacrifices and social circumstances that led to his career choice. Krishna accepts his father's reasoning and the two reconcile.

== Cast ==
- Suhas as Krishna Balwanth
- Shivani Nagaram as Mithra
- Naresh as Rao Balwanth, Krishna's father
- Vennela Kishore as Yuvan
- Ajay Ghosh as Durga Rao, Yuvan’s father
- Sudharshan as Banka, Krishna’s friend
- Annapurna as Krishna’s grandmother
- Harsha Vardhan as PVB, Mithra’s father
- Babu Mohan as Mithra’s grandfather
- Sravanthi Chokarapu as Champa
- Lavanya Reddy as Madalasa
- Rocket Raghava as Surendra, PVB's PA
- Jabardasth Dorababu as Kamlesh, PVB’s right-hand man
- Jaya Naidu as Mithra’s mother
- Appaji Ambarisha Darbha as Party President

== Release ==
=== Theatrical release ===
Hey Balwanth was theatrically released on 20 February 2026. The film was initially titled Hey Bhagawan, but just four days prior to its release, the Central Board of Film Certification (CBFC) requested a title change due to concerns over religious sentiments.

=== Home media ===
The digital streaming rights for the film were acquired by Zee5, while the satellite rights were secured by Zee Telugu. The film began premiering on Zee5 on 31 March 2026.

== Critical reception ==
Suhas Sistu of The Hans India wrote, "Hey Balwanth works best as a feel-good social dramedy that balances humour with emotion. Its clean comedy, heartfelt dialogues, and relatable father-son dynamics give it strong emotional grounding". Suresh Kavirayani of Cinema Express wrote, "Hey Balwanth offers intermittent laughs and a few emotional moments. While the story’s backdrop isn’t entirely convincing, the director manages to present it in an entertaining way". Divya Shree of The Times of India wrote, "Despite a few tonal inconsistencies, director Gopi Atchara effectively weaves together familial conflict and situational humour, shaping the film into a fairly engaging and dependable comedy entertainer".
