= Thanu Nenu =

- Poster
- Directed by: Ram Mohan P.
- Written by: Sai Sukumar P
- Produced by: Ram Mohan P.
- Starring: Santosh Sobhan; Avika Gor
- Cinematography: Suresh Sarangam
- Edited by: Marthand K. Venkatesh
- Music by: Sunny M.R.
- Production companies: Sunshine Cinemas; Viacom 18 Motion Pictures
- Distributed by: D. Suresh Babu
- Release date: 27 November 2015
- Country: India
- Language: Telugu

Thanu Nenu (transl. S/he and I) is a 2015 Indian Telugu-language romance film directed by writer Ram Mohan P. (in his directorial debut) and starring Santosh Sobhan and Avika Gor.

== Cast ==
- Santosh Sobhan as Kiran
- Avika Gor as Keerthi
- Ravi Babu as Keerthi's father
- Satya Krishnan as Keerthi's mother
- Rohit Varma as an NRI
- Naresh as Kiran's friend
- Kireeti Damaraju
- RK

== Soundtrack ==
Songs by Sunny M.R.

- "Pade Pade" - Aditya, Harshika Gudi
- "Tanu Nenu" - Anudeep Dev, Harshika Gudi
- "Nuvvu Todu Unte" - Arijit Singh
- "Suryudne Chusodamma" - Arijit Singh, Harshika Gudi, Sunny M.R.
- "Adigo Idigo" - Sunny M.R.

== Reception ==
Y. Sunita Chowdhary of The Hindu gave a mixed review and called the film "painfully slow". A critic from The Times of India gave the film a rating of two out of five stars and wrote that "There’s not much of commercial masala for the audiences who love such stuff, so this film may not be their cup of tea". A critic from 123Telugu gave the film a rating of three out of five and said that "On the whole, Tanu Nenu is a quirky love story which will appeal to the youth and multiplex audience mostly". Suresh Kavirayani of Deccan Chronicle called the film a "one time watch".
