= Blind Spot (2025 film) =

Indian Telugu-language film by Rakesh Varma

- Theatrical release poster
- Directed by: Rakesh Varma
- Written by: Rakesh Varma
- Produced by: Rama Krishna Veerapaneni
- Starring: Naveen Chandra; Ali Reza; Rashi Singh; Ravi Varma
- Cinematography: Darshan M Ambat
- Edited by: Satyaa G
- Music by: Sriram Maddury
- Production company: Mango Mass Media
- Release date: 9 May 2025
- Running time: 89 minutes
- Country: India
- Language: Telugu

Blind Spot is a 2025 Indian Telugu-language crime thriller film written and directed by Rakesh Varma. The film features Naveen Chandra, Ali Reza, Rashi Singh and Ravi Varma in important roles.

The film was released on 9 May 2025.

== Plot ==
Vikram, a determined police officer, is assigned to investigate the apparent suicide of Divya, a married woman who is found dead under suspicious circumstances. While the initial evidence suggests that she took her own life, Vikram notices several inconsistencies at the crime scene and begins to suspect that her death may actually be a carefully disguised murder.

As the investigation progresses, Vikram interrogates Divya's husband Aditya, her stepchildren, household staff, and several individuals connected to her personal and professional life. Each suspect appears to have motives and secrets that they are unwilling to reveal. Conflicting testimonies and misleading evidence create multiple possibilities, making it difficult to determine what truly happened on the night of Divya's death.

While reconstructing the events leading up to the incident, Vikram uncovers hidden tensions within Divya's family. Relationships that initially seem normal are revealed to be marked by resentment, betrayal, financial disputes, and emotional conflicts. The investigation becomes increasingly complex as new clues contradict earlier assumptions, forcing Vikram to repeatedly re-evaluate his theories. The case gradually transforms from a straightforward inquiry into a psychological puzzle in which perception and reality are often difficult to distinguish.

As Vikram digs deeper, he discovers that several crucial facts have been overlooked due to assumptions made by witnesses and investigators. These overlooked details—referred to as the "blind spots" of the case—prove to be the key to understanding the truth. By carefully connecting seemingly unrelated pieces of evidence, Vikram exposes a web of deception designed to conceal the actual circumstances surrounding Divya's death.

In the climax, Vikram reconstructs the crime and reveals the real sequence of events, exposing the individual responsible for Divya's murder. The investigation demonstrates how personal biases, incomplete observations, and hidden motives can distort the truth. With the mystery finally solved, the perpetrator is brought to justice, and the case that began as a suspected suicide is conclusively established as murder.

== Cast ==
- Naveen Chandra as Vikram
  - Harsh Roshan as Young Vikram
- Ali Reza as Aditya
- Rashi Singh as Divya
- Ravi Varma as Jayaram
- Gayatri Bhargavi as Lakshmi
- Kishore Kumar Polimera as Rambabu
- Gururaj Manepalli as Doctor
- Gadiraju Arun Kumar as K. Raghunandan
- Siddharth Gollapudi as Sudhakar
- Harika Pedada as Manasa
- Master Abhishikth as Vinod

== Music ==
The soundtrack and background score is composed by Sriram Maddury.

Track listing
No.	Title	Lyrics	Singer(s)	Length
1.	"Kanipinchevanni"	Rakesh Varma, Prakash Dasari	J’mymah	2:26

== Release and reception ==
Blind Spot was released on 9 May 2025. It was released on Amazon Prime Video on 13 June 2025.

10TV gave a positive review with particular praise for Naveen Chandra's performance. Banda Kalyan of Samayam Telugu too gave the same rating with praise for lead cast performances.
