= Net (film) =

2021 Indian thriller drama film

- Official release poster
- Directed by: Bhargav Macharla
- Written by: Bhargav Macharla
- Produced by: Surya Rahul Tamada; Saideep Reddy Borra
- Starring: Rahul Ramakrishna; Avika Gor; Praneetha Patnaik; Vishwadev Rachakonda
- Cinematography: Abhiraj Nair
- Edited by: Ravi Teja Girijala
- Music by: Naresh Kumuran
- Production company: Tamada Media
- Distributed by: ZEE5
- Release date: 10 September 2021
- Running time: 103 minutes
- Country: India
- Language: Telugu

Net (stylized as NET) is a 2021 Indian Telugu-language thriller drama film written and directed by debutant Bhargav Macharla. It is produced by Surya Rahul Tamada and Saideep Reddy Borra of Tamada Media. The film stars Rahul Ramakrishna, Avika Gor, Praneetha Patnaik and Vishwadev Rachakonda. It premiered on the streaming service ZEE5 on 10 September 2021.

== Plot ==
The plot revolves around a youngster in the cyber world. He gets trapped in the events around cybercrimes. Every moment in life is being monitored and used by strangers.

== Cast ==
- Rahul Ramakrishna as Lakshman
- Avika Gor as Priya
- Praneetha Patnaik as Suchitra
- Vishwadev Rachakonda as Ranjith
- Vishnu Oi
- Dakshi Guutikonda
- Shoban Chitraprolu
- Amulya Mende
- Harishchandra
- Anthony Som

== Production ==
The film marks the feature film debut of director Bhargav Macharla. Macharla wrote the script after studying data leaks and privacy breaches. Net was initially planned as a six-episode web series, but was later made as a direct-to-video film for ZEE5. Macherla cast Ramakrishna as he wanted someone who would look like a "regular guy in the neighbourhood" while Patnaik was signed after watching her performance in C/o Kancharapalem, as Macharla felt she could pull of a character in a realistic setting.

== Reception ==
In her review for The Hindu, Sangeetha Devi Dundoo called the film a "telling tale of online voyeurism." Praising the performances of Ramakrishna, Patnaik and Gor, Dundoo wrote, "NET could have been a full-fledged tech thriller had it looked at a crackdown on cybercrime, but it stays content in being a human drama, and leaving us with uneasy questions on privacy breach." Sravan Vanaparthy of The Times of India rated the film 3.5 stars out of 5 and stated: "Director Bhargav Macharla puts forward a good film in NET that tells the story in a natural and convincing manner."

Cinema Express critic Ram Venkat Srikar felt that the film was more of a tale of voyeurism than a surveillance thriller. He concluded his review saying: "NET is a self-aware attempt that works more as a drama than a thriller. A brilliant performance from Rahul Ramakrishna and the straightforward treatment makes it one of the better films of the year." Praveen Kumar Vadla of News18 Telugu also praised the writing and performances, in addition to the technical aspects.

== See also ==
- Hacked (film)
