= Bobby (2002 film) =

- Bobby Movie Poster
- Directed by: Sobhan
- Written by: Sobhan
- Produced by: K. Krishna Mohan Rao
- Starring: Mahesh Babu; Aarthi Agarwal; Raghuvaran; Prakash Raj
- Cinematography: Venkat Rama Prasad
- Edited by: S. Sudhakar Reddy
- Music by: Mani Sharma
- Distributed by: RK Associates
- Release date: 31 October 2002
- Running time: 167 minutes
- Country: India
- Language: Telugu
- Budget: ₹9–9.5 crore

Bobby is a 2002 Indian Telugu-language romance film written and directed by Sobhan and produced by K. Krishna Mohan Rao. The movie stars Mahesh Babu, Aarthi Agarwal, Raghuvaran, and Prakash Raj while Brahmanandam, Sunil, Pragathi, Ravi Babu, and Meher Ramesh play supporting roles. The soundtrack of the movie was scored by Mani Sharma, the cinematography was done by Venkat Rama Prasad, and editing was handled by S. Sudhakar Reddy. The film released on 31 October 2002.

== Plot ==
Yadagiri is a disabled mafia leader in Hyderabad, and KR is a rich businessman. Bhagyamati is Yadagiri's daughter, and Bhaskar “Bobby” is KR's son. The story of this film deals with what happens when these two people fall in love with each other. Bobby meets Bhagyamati in a club and falls in love with her. They later find out that their fathers are archrivals. Bhagyamati's mother was killed in an accident involving their fathers. Knowing this, Bobby and Bhagyamati elope, but due to unavoidable circumstances, they come back and are injured in a shootout. Then, their fathers apologize and make up. In the end Bobby and Bhagyamati are married.

== Cast ==
- Mahesh Babu as Bhaskar “Bobby”
- Aarthi Agarwal as Bhagyamati
- Raghuvaran as KR, Bobby's father
- Prakash Raj as Yadagiri, Bhagyamati's father
- Brahmanandam as Ammi Raju
- Sunil as Hotel Manager
- Pragathi as Bobby's mother
- Meher Ramesh as Sunil
- Rama Prabha as Bhagyamati's grandmother
- Ravi Babu as Ravi Shankar
- Posani Krishna Murali as Koti
- Chittajalu Lakshmipati as Home Minister
- L.B. Sriram
- Sai Vignesh as the roadside kid
- Ramakrishna Veerapaneni

== Production ==
Sobhan initially wanted Tara Sharma to star in the film, but the producer recommended Aarthi Agarwal. The songs were choreographed by Nikki, Raghava Lawrence (for "Vaa Vaa"), Raja Sekhar, Harish Pai. Part of the film was shot at Padmalaya Studios.

== Music ==
Bobby

Studio album by Mani Sharma
- Released: 2002 (India)
- Genre: Feature film soundtrack
- Label: Supreme Music
- Producer: Mani Sharma

Mani Sharma chronology
Chennakeshava Reddy (2002)	Bobby (2002)	Pellam Oorelithe (2002)

The film has 6 songs composed by Mani Sharma. The song "Lokam" is based on the "Love Don't Cost a Thing" by Jennifer Lopez. In an audio review, Sreya Sunil of Idlebrain.com wrote that "Overall, Mani Sharma comes with a score that grows on you slowly and which definitely needs support from the director on how well he translates the audio into vivacious visuals".

- "Ee Jenda" – Shankar Mahadevan, Lyrics by Shakthi
- "Vaa Vaa" – S. P. Balasubrahmanyam & Sunitha Upadrashta, Lyrics by Suddala Ashok Teja
- "Lokam" – Kalpana, Lyrics by Shakti
- "Pullani Pullattu" – Mano, Lyrics by Bharati Babu
- "Adugadugu" – Hariharan, Ranjith, Lyrics by Shakthi
- "Laalu Darwaja" – Mallikarjun, Kalpana, Lyrics by Shakthi

== Reception ==
Idlebrain.com gave the film 3.25 out of 5 and praised Mahesh Babu for his acting. Sify gave 3 out of five stars and added that "The film lacks a basic story, as there is nothing new." Gudipoodi Srihari of The Hindu wrote that "Technically speaking, the film gives an 'overdone' feel, especially in using graphic work".
