= Ajay Ghosh =

Indian actor

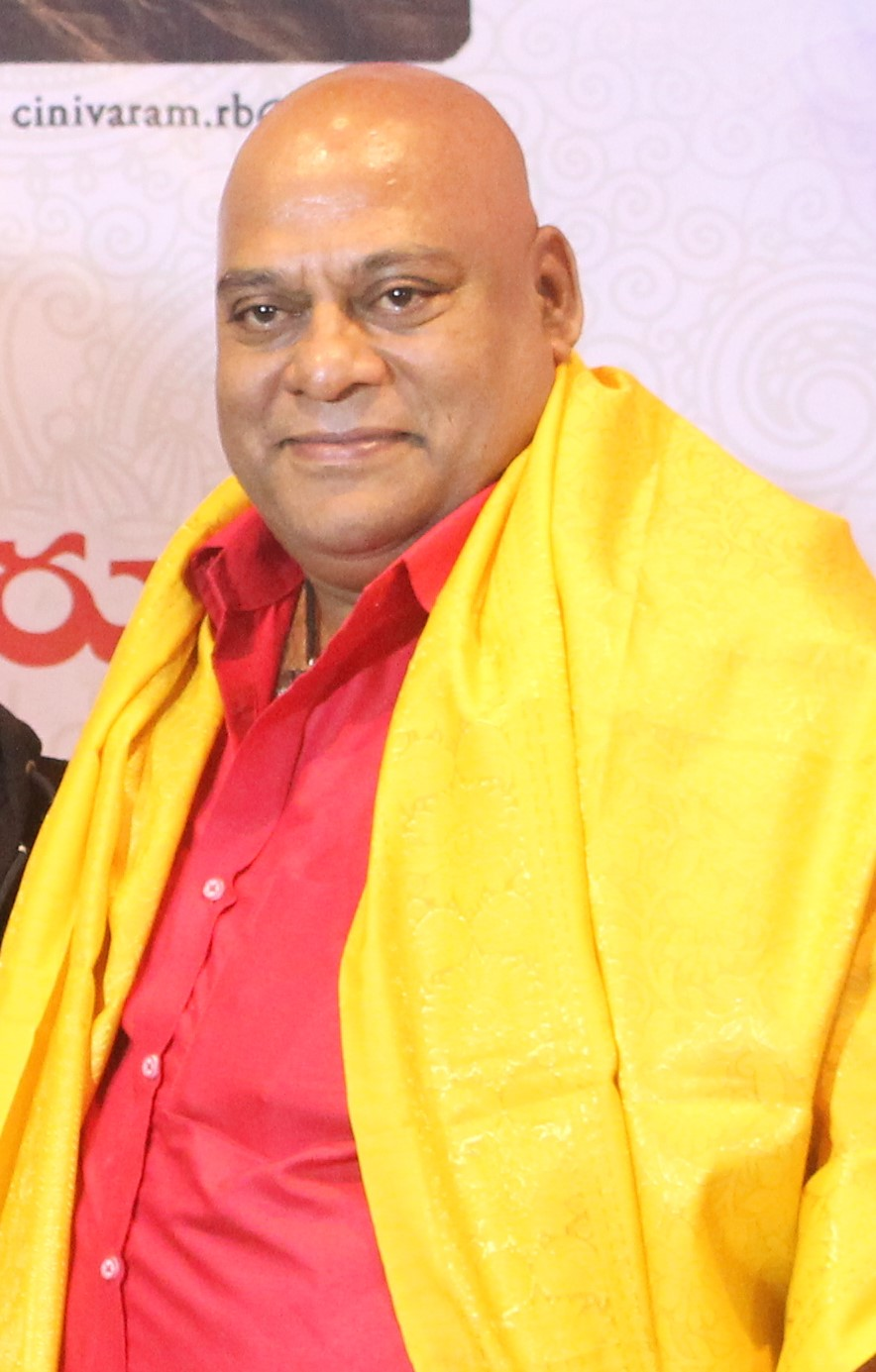
- Born: Pathipati Ajay Ghosh; 1965 (age 60–61); Vetapalem, Andhra Pradesh, India
- Occupation: Actor
- Years active: 2001–present
- Spouse: Sambhalakshmi
- Children: D. Bhagath Singh and D. Ramanjaneyulu
- Awards: SIIMA Award

Pathipati Ajay Ghosh is an Indian actor and comedian known for his works primarily in Telugu cinema and theatre, in addition to a few Tamil films. He is known for his works in hits such as Jyothi Lakshmi (2015), Visaranai (2016), Rangasthalam (2018), Pushpa: The Rise (2021) and Guntur Kaaram (2024).

== Personal life ==
Pathipati Ajay Ghosh was born into a Hindu family in Vetapalem, Bapatla district, Andhra Pradesh. His father was a communist and a staunch follower of freedom fighter Ajoy Ghosh, after whom he named his son. Ghosh has two brothers who were also named after freedom fighters.

Ghosh is married to Sambhalakshmi, and the couple has two sons,Pathipati Bhagath Singh and Pathipati Chandra Sekhar Azad.

== Career ==
After a brief stint as a stage actor, and news reader in Siti Cable, Bapatla, Ghosh ventured into acting through SIRI daily serial on DD Telugu and found his way to feature films before getting his breakthrough with Vetrimaaran's Visaranai (2016).

== Filmography ==
=== Telugu films ===
Year	Title	Role	Notes
2008	Ghatothkach	Duryodhan (voice)	Telugu version
2010	Prasthanam		
2012	Ramadandu		
2014	Autonagar Surya	Giri's henchman	
2014	Run Raja Run	Munuswamy	
2015	Jyothi Lakshmi	Narayan Patwari	
2016	Express Raja	Ajay Ghosh	
2016	Kundanapu Bomma		
2016	Selfie Raja		
2016	Ism	Reporter	
2016	Nandini Nursing Home	Ratna Babu	
2016	Saptagiri Express		
2017	Egise Taara Juvvalu		
2017	Aakatayi	Beeku	
2017	Baahubali 2: The Conclusion	Dacoit	
2017	Venkatapuram	Police officer	
2017	London Babulu		
2018	Bhaagamathie	Jose	
2018	Rangasthalam	Seshu Naidu	
2018	Shambho Shankara		
2018	Anthaku Minchi	Occultist	
2018	Moodu Puvvulu Aaru Kayalu		
2018	Vadena		
2019	Mithai	Boss	
2019	Brochevarevarura	Kidnapper	
2019	Edaina Jaragocchu	Hizrath	
2019	Undiporaadhey		
2019	Raju Gari Gadhi 3	Garudaraja Pillai	
2019	Madhanam		
2019	Mathu Vadalara	House owner	
2020	Uttara		
2020	Orey Bujjiga		
2021	Bangaru Bullodu	Police Inspector	
2021	Jai Sena		
2021	Akshara	Pindi Tatha	
2021	Shaadi Mubarak		
2021	Raja Raja Chora	Subrahmanyam	
2021	Manchi Rojulochaie	Tirumalasetty "Gundu" Gopalam	
2021	Pushpa: The Rise	Konda Reddy	
2022	Suraapanam	Mallanna	
2022	Raajahyogam	Radha	
2023	Veera Simha Reddy	Addibakula Peddi Reddy	
2023	Organic Mama Hybrid Alludu	Gajula Gangarao	
2023	Dochevaarevarura		
2023	Nireekshana	Ashok	Only dubbed version released
2023	Bedurulanka 2012	Bhushanam	
2023	Naa Nee Prema Katha		
2023	Mangalavaaram	Kaasi Raju	
2024	Guntur Kaaram	Hari Das	
2024	Happy Ending	Swamiji	
2024	Eagle	MLA Someshwar Reddy	
2024	The Family Star	Rowdy	
2024	Kismat	Janardhan	
2024	Prathinidhi 2	Finance Minister Gajendra	
2024	Music Shop Murthy	"Music Shop" Murthy aka DJ Murthy	Lead role
2024	Saripodhaa Sanivaaram	Narayana Prabha	
2025	Game Changer	Biyyam Bhimarao	
2025	Dear Uma	Hospital Chairman	
2025	They Call Him OG	Gossiper	
2025	Mass Jathara	Sannasi Naidu	
2025	Paanch Minar	Murthy	
2026	Bhartha Mahasayulaku Wignyapthi	Goon	
2026	Hey Balwanth	Durga Rao	
2026	Papam Prathap	Veerayya	
2026	Mareechika	Anji Babu	
2026	Peddi	Paidappa	
2026	Irumudi		

=== Tamil films ===
Year	Title	Role	Notes
2016	Visaranai	Vishveshwara Rao	
2018	Bhaagamathie	Jose	
2018	Maari 2	Singayya	
2019	Natpe Thunai	Deenadayalan	
2019	Kanchana 3	A. Natarajan	
2019	Mei	Karunakaran	
2020	Mookuthi Amman	Bhagavathi Baba	
2025	Phoenix		
2025	Revolver Rita	Reddy	
2026	Baththa	Pedda Kondaiah	
2026	Mookuthi Amman 2		

=== Other language films ===
Year	Title	Role	Language	Notes
2017	Kariya 2		Kannada	
2021	Govinda Govinda	Tirupati	Kannada	
2025	Jaat	Rama Subba Reddy	Hindi	

=== Television ===
- Mamaji Mayajalam DD (2001)
- Siri DD (2003–2005)
- Lakshmi Nivasam Gemini TV (2004)
- Bhajana Batch (2019)

== Awards and nominations ==
Year	Award	Category	Work	Result	Ref.
2015	1st IIFA Utsavam	Best Performance In a Negative Role	Jyothi Lakshmi	Nominated	
2021	9th South Indian International Movie Awards	Best Comedian – Telugu	Raju Gari Gadhi 3	Won	
2022	10th South Indian International Movie Awards	Best Comedian – Telugu	Manchi Rojulochaie	Nominated	
