= Neeli Megha Shyama =

2025 Indian Telugu-language film by Ravi S Varmaa

- Release poster
- Directed by: Ravi S Varmaa
- Screenplay by: Nandu Savirigana
- Story by: Arjun–Carthyk
- Produced by: Karthik Satya
- Starring: Vishwadev Rachakonda; Payal Radhakrishna
- Cinematography: Suneel Reddy
- Edited by: Balaji VBJ
- Music by: Shravan Bharadwaj
- Production company: Moonshine Entertainments
- Distributed by: Aha
- Release date: 9 January 2025
- Running time: 116 minutes
- Country: India
- Language: Telugu

Neeli Megha Shyama is a 2025 Indian Telugu-language romantic comedy film directed by Ravi S Varmaa. The film features Vishwadev Rachakonda and Payal Radhakrishna in lead roles. The film was released on 9 January 2025 on Aha.

== Plot ==
Shyam (Vishwadev Rachakonda) is born with silver spoon and has a father who criticizes him for his irregular and bad life style. He goes to Kulumanali in search of himself. He meets Megha (Payal Radhakrishna), who is a regular trecker and is assigned to guide Shyam in the trecking journey. She gets breakup from her ex-lover and guides hero in trecking. He finally transforms to a good human being in her presence. He proposes to her and she rejects it, because of her bitter experience. And finally they reunite in their friends' marriage.

== Cast ==
- Vishwadev Rachakonda as Shyam
- Payal Radhakrishna as Megha
- Harsha Vardhan as Viplav
- Tanikella Bharani as Shyam's father
- Subhalekha Sudhakar as Megha's grandfather
- Sudharshan as Shyam's friend
- Dubbing Janaki as Megha's grandmother

== Music ==
Music of the film is composed by Shravan Bharadwaj.

All music is composed by Shravan Bharadwaj.

No.	Title	Lyrics	Singer(s)	Length
1.	"Neeli Meghamanthata"	Krishna Kanth	Karthik	3:54
2.	"Arere Manase"	Suresh Banisetti	Chinmayi Sripada	2:31
3.	"Puvula Ralane Vennala Kargane"	M Chitran	Shravan Bharadwaj	3:03
4.	"Ninnu Chupulu Vethike Lope"	Krishna Kanth	Lalitha Kavya, Shravan Bharadwaj	3:24

== Release and reception ==
Neeli Megha Shyama was originally scheduled to have a theatrical release, but had a direct-to-video release on Aha on 9 January 2025.

Kausalya Rachavelpula of The Hans India had a positive opinion saying "Neeli Megha Shyama is a delightful, feel-good romantic comedy with standout humor". She further praised the performance of Vishwadev Rachakonda. A review on Ap7am found it was "a formulaic love story that doesn’t explore its potential." while ObNews wrote it was " acharming romantic comedy with excellent humor" but "lack[ing] emotional depth."
