= Lakshmipati (actor) =

Indian Telugu comedian

- Born: Chittajalu Lakshmipati; July 9, 1957
- Died: February 7, 2008 (aged 50)
- Occupations: Actor, writer, anchor
- Years active: 1998–2008
- Spouse: Sai Sireesha
- Relatives: Sobhan (brother); Santosh Sobhan (nephew); Sangeeth Sobhan (nephew)

Chittajalu Lakshmipati, known mononymously as Lakshmipati, was an Indian actor and writer who predominantly appeared in Telugu films, acting in over 70 of them. He was the elder brother of Sobhan, who directed the film Varsham. He died a few days after his brother's death.

== Career ==
Lakshmipati started as a writer and no time he started hosting shows like the well known sensational show called Huss Gup Chup as Gireesam Master and he worked as writer for Krishna Vamsi's Chandralekha and he is a well known comedian to Telugu film lovers. He was first seen in Chiranjeevi's Choodalani Vundi. He got a break as an actor with EVV's film Allari and he first played a negative role in Mahesh Babu's Bobby, directed by his brother Sobhan. He also played significant roles in Andhrudu, Pedababu and Kithakithalu.

== Death ==
Lakshmipati died of a heart attack on 7 February 2008.

== Filmography ==
1. Aadarsa Kutumbam (1969)
2. Aatmakatha (1988)
3. Choopulu Kalasina Subhavela (1988)
4. Bujjigadi Babai (1990)
5. Inspector Rudra (1990)
6. Ooha (1996)
7. Pelli Peetalu (1998)
8. Choodalani Vundi (1998)
9. Chandralekha (1998) (writer)
10. 9 Nelalu (2000)
11. Murari (2001)
12. Jayam (2002)
13. Allari (2002)
14. Nee Sneham (2002)
15. Gemeni (2002)
16. Bobby (2002)
17. Sreeram (2002)
18. Thotti Gang (2002)
19. Juniors (2003)
20. Nijam (2003)
21. Ammayilu Abbayilu (2003)
22. Vijayam (2003)
23. Ninne Ishtapaddanu (2003)
24. Kalyana Ramudu (2003)
25. Charminar (2003)
26. Aadanthe Ado Type (2003)
27. Villain (2003)
28. Satta (2004)
29. Aa Naluguru (2004)
30. Pedababu (2004)
31. Donga Dongadi (2004)
32. Malliswari (2004)
33. Xtra (2004)
34. Chanti (2004)
35. Sakhiya (2004)
36. Vijayendra Varma (2004)
37. Shankar Dada M.B.B.S. (2004)
38. Evadi Gola Vaadidhi (2005)
39. Relax (2005)
40. Danger (2005)
41. Soggadu (2005)
42. Premikulu (2005)
43. Nuvvante Naakishtam (2005)
44. Andhrudu (2005)
45. Adirindayya Chandram (2005)
46. Mahanandi (2005)
47. Kithakithalu (2006)
48. Nee Navvu Chalu (2006)
49. Andala Ramudu (2006)
50. Veerabhadra (2006)
51. Annavaram (2006)
52. Maharathi (2007)
53. Lakshmi Kalyanam (2007)
54. Anumanaspadam (2007)
55. Athili Sattibabu LKG (2007)
56. Vijayadasami (2007)
57. Viyyalavari Kayyalu (2007)
58. Okka Magaadu (2008)
59. Sundarakanda (2008) (posthumous release)
60. Veedu Mamoolodu Kadu (2008) (posthumous release)
61. Andamaina Manasulo (2008) (posthumous release)
62. Mangatayaru Tiffin Centre (2008) (posthumous release)
63. Hare Ram (2008) (posthumous release)
64. Ninna Nedu Repu (2008) (posthumous release)
