= Anni Manchi Sakunamule =

- Film poster
- Directed by: B. V. Nandini Reddy
- Screenplay by: Sheik Dawood G.
- Dialogues by: Lakshmi Bhupala
- Produced by: Priyanka Dutt
- Starring: Santosh Sobhan; Malvika Nair
- Cinematography: Sunny Kurapati; Richard Prasad
- Edited by: Junaid Siddiqui
- Music by: Mickey J. Meyer
- Production companies: Swapna Cinema; Mitra Vinda Movies
- Release date: 18 May 2023
- Running time: 154 minutes
- Country: India
- Language: Telugu

Anni Manchi Sakunamule (transl. 'All good omens') is a 2023 Indian Telugu-language romantic family drama film directed by B. V. Nandini Reddy and produced by Priyanka Dutt under Swapna Cinema and Mitra Vinda Movies. The film stars Santosh Sobhan, Malvika Nair, Rajendra Prasad, Rao Ramesh, Naresh, Gautami and Ashwin Kumar in supporting roles, with the latter made his feature film debut in Telugu. The music was composed by Mickey J. Meyer.

== Cast ==
- Santosh Sobhan as Rishi Prasad
- Malvika Nair as Aryani
- Rajendra Prasad as Prasad, Arya’s father, Rishi’s adoptive father
- Rao Ramesh as Diwakar, Sudhakar’s elder brother
- Naresh as Sudhakar, Rishi’s father, Arya’s adoptive father
- Gauthami as Meenakshi, Prasad’s wife, Arya’s mother, Rishi’s adoptive mother
- Ashwin Kumar Lakshmikanthan as Ram, Prasad’s nephew, Rishi’s cousin, Sravya’s brother (Voice dubbed by Rahul Ravindran)
- Sowcar Janaki as Janaki, Prasad’s aunt, Rishi's adoptive grandmother
- Urvashi as Doctor Jagadamba
- Anju Alva Naik as Vasudha, Sudhakar’s wife, Rishi’s mother, Arya’s adoptive mother
- Venkatesh Kakumanu as Vasu, Rishi's friend
- Vasuki Anand as Gayathri Prasad, Prasad’s daughter, Rishi's adoptive elder sister
- Vennela Kishore as Gayathri’s husband, Prasad's son-in-law
- Raj Madiraju as Ram and Sravya’s father, Prasad’s brother-in-law
- Bindu Chandramouli as Ram and Sravya’s mother, Prasad’s sister
- Giri Babu as Judge
- Chandra Mohan as Police
- Satya as Voscar Gangaraju
- Ramya Subramanian as Divya, Sudhakar’s daughter, Arya’s adoptive elder sister
- Udbhav Raghunandan as Duggu, Divya’s husband, Sudhakar’s son-in-law
- Mahesh Achanta as Compounder
- Sritha Nandiraj as Sravya, Ram’s younger sister, Prasad’s niece, Rishi’s cousin
- Rohith Addanki as Sravya’s fiance
- Jhansi as Sravya’s fiance’s mother
- Thagubothu Ramesh as Ramesh, Sravya’s wedding guest
- R.J. Hemant as Sravya’s wedding guest
- Vadlamani Srinivas as Veeraswamy, a loan shark

== Production ==
The entire film was shot at the hill station of Coonoor and few cities in Europe and USA.

== Release ==
The film was released on 18 May 2023. The film's digital rights were brought by Amazon Prime Video, while the satellite rights were brought by Zee Telugu. The film started streaming on Prime Video from June 17, 2023 in Telugu along with dubbed versions in Tamil, Hindi, Malayalam, and Kannada languages.

== Soundtrack ==
The film score and soundtrack were composed by Mickey J. Meyer. The audio rights were acquired by Sony Music India. The first single titled "Anni Manchi Sakunamule" was released on 21 March 2023. The second single titled "Merise Mabbullo" was released on 20 April 2023. The third single titled "Cheyyi Cheyyi Kalipeddam" was released on 20 April 2023.

Track list
No.	Title	Lyrics	Singer(s)	Length
1.	"Anni Manchi Sakunamule Title Track"	Rehman	Karthik	4:19
2.	"Sita Kalyanam"	Chandrabose	Chaitra Ambadipudi, Sri Krishna	2:56
3.	"Merise Mabbullo"	Rehman	Nakul Abhyankar, Ramya Bhat Abhyankar	3:37
4.	"Cheyyi Cheyyi Kalipeddam"	Chandrabose	Chaitra Ambadipudi, Saandip, Sri Krishna, Venu Srirangam	3:04
5.	"Yemito"	Ramajogayya Sastry	Chaitra Ambadipudi	2:35
6.	"Hillori"	Rehman	Ritesh G Rao	2:07
Total length:				18:40
