= Gossip (2026 film) =

- Theatrical release poster
- Directed by: Vaibhav Koundinya
- Written by: Vaibhav Koundinya
- Produced by: Yethi Remella
- Starring: Rashi Singh; Ravi Varma; Vijay Adhiraj; Prudhvi Raj
- Cinematography: Sathish Rajaboyina
- Edited by: Jaya Kumar
- Music by: Skathikanth Karthick
- Production company: Ybhav Cine Sculpt Studios
- Distributed by: One Media Et Private Limited
- Release date: 26 June 2026
- Running time: 119 minutes
- Country: India
- Language: Telugu

Gossip is a 2026 Indian Telugu-language drama film directed by Vaibhav Koundinya and produced by Yethi Remella under Vaibhav CineSculpt Stuidos. The film stars Rashi Singh in lead role, Ravi Varma, Vijay Adhiraj, Prudhvi raj, Mahesh Yadlapalli in supporting roles.

The film's music composed by Skathikanth Karthick, cinematography by Sathish Rajaboyina, Editing by Jaya Kumar. The film was released on 26 June 2026.

== Plot ==
Ajanta is a kind-hearted young woman who loses her mother in childhood and is lovingly raised by her father, Ramesh, and her maternal uncle, Surya Prakash, who treats her as his own daughter alongside his biological daughter, Nakshatra. Passionate about music and devoted to playing the Veena, Ajanta shares a close bond with her friends Roopa, Siri, and Sravanthi. She is also deeply admired by Teja, a sincere young man who quietly hopes to marry her despite his love remaining unrequited. Meanwhile, a group of acquaintances—Pankaj, Soori, and Nani—engage in casual gossip that gradually transforms into damaging rumors about Ajanta and Nakshatra. As the rumors spread, they gain credibility within the community, eventually influencing Surya Prakash, who begins connecting unrelated incidents from Ajanta’s life and becomes convinced that the allegations are true. His confrontation with Ramesh shatters their long-standing friendship and drives a painful rift between the families.

Unable to reveal the truth behind his sudden change in behavior, Ramesh hastily arranges Ajanta’s marriage. Confused by his emotional distance, she initially refuses, but after Ramesh dies of a heart attack following his final wish that she marry Praveen, she reluctantly honors his request. However, her married life becomes a nightmare when she discovers that Praveen is psychologically abusive and unstable. At the same time, Teja falls into depression and drug addiction, eventually leading to his arrest by the Narcotics Control Bureau and court-ordered rehabilitation. Years later, Surya Prakash overhears the same gossip group spreading rumors about an unnamed young woman, only to realize they are referring to his own daughter, Nakshatra. The revelation forces him to confront the devastating consequences of believing rumors over truth, as he finally understands how unchecked gossip can irreversibly destroy lives, relationships, and families.

== Cast ==
- Rashi Singh as Ajanta
- Ravi Varma
- Vijay Adhiraj
- Prudhvi Raj
- Mahesh Yadlapalli

== Music ==
The film's music is composed by Skathikanth Karthick. The film's music rights were acquired by Aditya Music.

== Reception ==
Suhas Sistu From HansIndia rated it 3 out of 5 and appreciated as A thougt Provoking Social Drama, Telugucinemas.in rated the film 3 out of 5 and stated that gossip is a sincere social drama with an important message, and the civic posts stated that simple story with powerful emotional core.
