= Santosh Sobhan =

Indian actor, born 1995

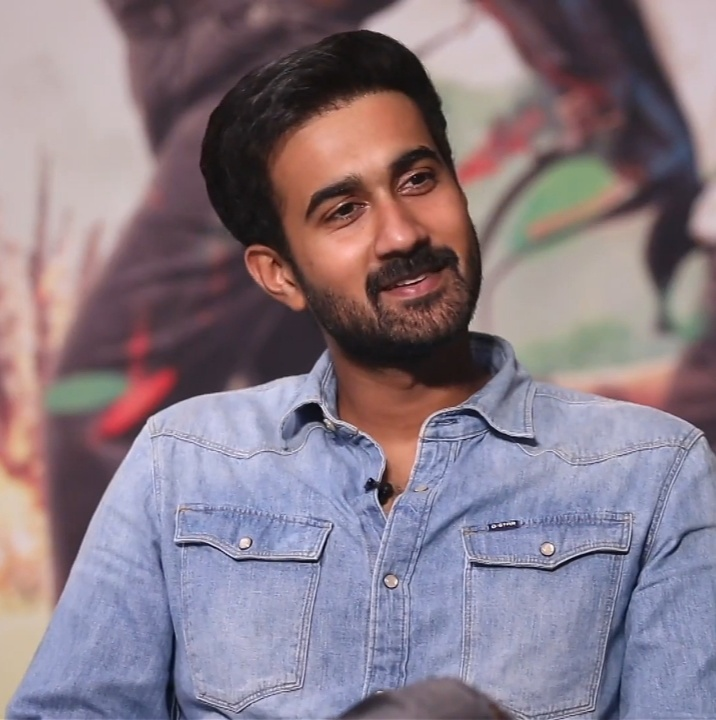
- Santosh in 2022
- Born: 12 July 1995 (age 31)
- Occupation: Actor
- Years active: 2011–present
- Father: Sobhan
- Relatives: Lakshmipati (uncle); Sangeeth Sobhan (brother)

Chittajalu Santosh Sobhan (born 12 July 1995) is an Indian actor who works in Telugu films. Son of film director Sobhan, Santosh made his debut in the film Golconda High School (2011). His successful films include Ek Mini Katha (2021) and Manchi Rojulochaie (2021).

== Early life and career ==
Santosh was born on 12 July 1995 to Telugu film director Sobhan. His uncle Chittajalu Lakshmipati was a comedian in Telugu films and his younger brother is actor Sangeeth Sobhan.

Santosh completed his graduation in mass communication but opted to pursue a career in films like his father. He first appeared in Mohana Krishna Indraganti-directed sports film Golconda High School in 2011.

In 2015, Santosh made his debut as a lead in Ram Mohan P.'s Thanu Nenu, alongside Avika Gor. Suresh Kavirayani of Deccan Chronicle called him a "surprise element" while The Hindu's Y. Sunitha Chowdhary wrote that he showed a "lot of ease" and reminded her of actor Srinivas Avasarala. Following Thanu Nenu, Santosh took a break from films. Santosh returned to cinema in 2018 with Paper Boy. The following year, he appeared in TV series The Grill.

In 2021, Santosh a played a young adult who suffers from small penis syndrome in Ek Mini Katha. Ram Venkat Srikar of Cinema Express appreciated his performance, writing, "Santosh Shoban’s reticent performance entwined with the deadpan dialogue delivery brilliantly complements the smutty humour." Later that year, Santosh starred in Maruthi-directed Manchi Rojulochaie, alongside Mehreen Pirzada. In his review of the film, Murali Krishna CH of The New Indian Express stated: "Santosh Sobhan gives a decent performance, but he has to work on his expressions."

Santosh has appeared in Kalyanam Kamaneeyam, followed by B. V. Nandini Reddy's Anni Manchi Sakunamule, opposite Malavika Nair and Prem Kumar.

== Filmography ==
Key
†	Denotes films that have not yet been released

Year	Film	Role	Notes	Ref.
2011	Golconda High School	Gowtham	Child actor	
2014	Bangaru Kodipetta	Venu	Supporting role	
2015	Thanu Nenu	Kiran	Debut as lead actor	
2018	Paper Boy	Ravi		
2021	Ek Mini Katha	Santosh	Released on Amazon Prime Video	
2021	Manchi Rojulochaie	Santosh "Santu"		
2022	Like, Share & Subscribe	Viplav		
2023	Kalyanam Kamaneeyam	Shiva		
2023	Sridevi Shoban Babu	Shoban Babu		
2023	Anni Manchi Sakunamule	Rishi		
2023	Prem Kumar	Prem Kumar		
2026	Couple Friendly	Siva Sai Pratap		
2026	Parimala and Co	Chittarasan "Chittu"	Tamil film	
TBA	Joruga Hushaaruga Shikaaru Podhama †	TBA	Filming	
TBA	Production no. 4 †	TBA	Filming	

=== Television ===
Year	Title	Role	Network	Notes	Ref.
2019	The Grill	Arjun	Viu	Web Debut	
2021	The Baker and The Beauty	Vijay Krishna Dasaripalle	Aha		
