= MenToo (film) =

2023 Telugu-language comedy-drama film

#MenToo
- Directed by: Srikanth G. Reddy
- Written by: Srikanth G. Reddy; Rakendu Mouli (dialogue)
- Produced by: Mourya Siddavaram
- Starring: Naresh Agastya; Brahmaji; Riya Suman
- Cinematography: P. C. Mouli
- Edited by: Karthik Vunnava
- Music by: Elisha Praveen G. Osho Venkat
- Production company: Lantern Creative Works
- Distributed by: Mythri Movie Makers
- Release date: 26 May 2023
- Running time: 113 minutes
- Country: India
- Language: Telugu

#MenToo is a 2023 Indian Telugu-language comedy drama film. Written and directed by Srikanth G. Reddy, the film has Brahmaji in a pivotal role. Naresh Agastya, Harsha Chemudu, Sudharshan, Riya Suman, Priyanka Sharma, Mourya Siddavaram, Kaushik Ghantasala, Ashritha, and Karthik Adusumilli play major roles in the movie, which was produced by Mourya Siddavaram under Lantern Creative Works. The film has music by Elisha Praveen and a background score by Osho Venkat. The trailer for the movie 'Men Two' was released by Vishwak Sen and Sandeep Kishan. Mythri Movie Makers released the film across the Telugu states.

== Plot ==
The story starts with the narrator defining feminism and its misuse by women. The narrator is a bar named "Stags only" where no woman enters the bar. This is a story of 3 friends who share their story- Aditya (Naresh Agastya), Sanju and Munna. Aditya is a salesman in Cenit Hub and the only male in the company. He lives with his single mother, who is a doctor and a support system to him. Sanju is a US-return guy who is rich but also wants true love. He has a girlfriend Neha who does stand-up comedy shows slamming men. Her dream is to do a show in US which is the life Sanju doesn't want. Munna is a mechanic who hates girls.

Rahul (Harsha Chemudu), an Operations Manager from IIT enters the bar feeling depressed. He is accused of sexual harassment and is fired from the company. Despite Rahul pleading not guilty, the HR still fires him.

== Cast ==
- Naresh Agastya as Aditya
- Brahmaji as Suspicious Guy
- Harsha Chemudu as Rahul
- Sudharshan as Jack Daniel
- Riya Suman as Tara
- Priyanka Sharma as Neha
- Mourya Siddavaram as Munna
- Kaushik Ghantasala as Sanju
- Karthik Adusumilli as Two Peg Guy
- Ashrita Vemuganti
- Sarah Somasunder as Cheater Girl

== Soundtrack ==
Elisha Praveen G composed the songs for the film, while Osho Venkat composed the background score. The music distribution rights were acquired by Saregama.

Men Too

Soundtrack album by Elisha Praveen G Background Score: Osho Venkat
- Released: 2023
- Recorded: 2023
- Genre: Feature film soundtrack
- Language: Telugu
- Label: Saregama

External audio
- Men Too - Full Song Jukebox on YouTube

== Release ==
#MenToo was released theatrically on May 26, 2023.

Digital streaming rights were obtained by Aha where it premiering on 9 June 2023

== Reception ==
#MenToo received mixed reviews from critics and audience.

Srivathsan Nadadhur of OTTplay gave it 1 out of 5 stars and wrote,"MenToo is a silly film revolving around a few butthurt men with provocative generalisations about women."

Paul Nicodemus of The Times of India gave 2 out of 5 stars and wrote "With a dose of comedy, the film tries to bring in and present an interesting perspective from the vantage point of men but fumbles in its execution."
