= Pittagoda =

Indian Telugu-language romantic drama film

- Official poster
- Directed by: Anudeep K. V.
- Produced by: Ram Mohan P.
- Starring: Vishwadev Rachakonda; Punarnavi Bhupalam
- Cinematography: Udhay Thangavel
- Edited by: Aryan mouli,Venkata Krishna Chikkala
- Music by: Kamalakar
- Release date: 24 December 2016
- Country: India
- Language: Telugu

Pittagoda is a 2016 Indian Telugu-language romantic drama film directed by Anudeep K. V. in his directorial debut and starring newcomer Vishwadev Rachakonda and Punarnavi Bhupalam. The film uses the Karimnagar dialect from Telangana.

== Cast ==
- Vishwadev Rachakonda as Tippu
- Punarnavi Bhupalam as Divya

== Music ==
The music for the film was composed by Kamalakar.

Pittagoda

Soundtrack album by Kamalakar
- Released: 2016
- Genre: Feature film soundtrack
- Length: 20:09
- Language: Telugu
- Label: Aditya Music
External audio
- Pittagoda – Jukebox on YouTube

Track listing
No.	Title	Lyrics	Singer(s)	Length
1.	"Welcome to Maa Lokam"	Sri Mani	Ranjith	3:54
2.	"Emaindo"	Sri Mani	Mallikarjun, Reeta	3:57
3.	"Thiyya Thiyyani"	Sri Mani	Haricharan	4:04
4.	"Jarigene"	Sri Mani	Haricharan	4:13
5.	"Thiyya Thiyyani (Female)"	Sri Mani	Anweshaa	4:01
Total length:				20:09

== Reception ==
Y. Sunitha Chowdhary of The Hindu opined that "The film is excruciatingly slow, the first scene where the kids climb a wall and put up posters is ambitious and interesting, but sadly the interest wanes very soon". Sridivya Palaparthi of The Times of India said that "Pittagoda is a no-frills story and an honest attempt to entertain. If you’re looking for a laid back watch for the weekend, this is it".
