= Chanti (2004 film) =

- Directed by: Sobhan
- Written by: Gopi Venkatesh (dialogues)
- Screenplay by: Shahjahan Ravi, Vivek
- Story by: Sudha Satti
- Produced by: Krishna Kishore
- Starring: Ravi Teja; Charmme Kaur; Daisy Bopanna; Atul Kulkarni
- Cinematography: Prasad Murella
- Edited by: Kotagiri Venkateswara Rao
- Music by: Sri
- Production company: Vijaya Bala Productions
- Release date: 12 November 2004
- Running time: 147 minutes
- Country: India
- Language: Telugu

Chanti is a 2004 Indian Telugu action drama film, starring Ravi Teja and Charmme Kaur in lead roles. The film was directed by Sobhan, produced by Krishna Kishore and the music was composed by Sri. It was released on 12 November 2004 to negative reviews. This was Sobhan's last film as a director before his death in 2008.

The film was later dubbed and released in Hindi as Main Insaaf Karoonga 2 (2018).

== Plot ==
Chanti (Ravi Teja), a soldier, arrives at his village for his father Madhav Rao's (Ranganath) funeral. He is bequeathed a huge property which he plans to use for his blind sister Jyothi (Revathi) to get her married. Unfortunately, the land happens to be between two proposed sites for a road in which the local MLA Sarvarayudu (Atul Kulkarni) has an interest, as it leads to his sugar factory. He offers to buy it from Chanti, who refuses, citing it as a memorial of his father. Chanti's sister is married to Raja Ravindra (Raja Ravindra), Chanti's army friend. However, the MLA kills Raja. Later, Chanti avenges his friend's and father's deaths, protecting his father's memorial site.

== Cast ==
- Ravi Teja as K. Murali a.k.a. Chanti
- Charmme Kaur as Vasantha Laxmi
- Daisy Bopanna as Anjali, MLA's sister
- Atul Kulkarni as MLA Challa Sarvarayudu
- Revathy as Jyothi, Chanti's sister
- Raghu Babu as Inspector D. Ram Murthi
- Subbaraju as MLA's brother-in-law
- Banerji as MRO
- Chittajalu Lakshmipati as Appa Rao
- Venu Madhav
- Raghava Malladi as factory labourer
- Mallikarjuna Rao as MLA's lawyer
- M. S. Narayana as Vasantha Laxmi's father
- Ranganath as Retired Subedar Major Madhav Rao, Chanti's father
- Narra Venkateswara Rao as Minister Sesha Rao, MLA's father-in-law
- Raja Ravindra as Raja Ravindra, Chanti's brother-in-law
- Dharmavarapu Subramanyam as Sarpanch
- Kallu Chidambaram as Bus conductor

== Production ==
The film was shot in Palakollu, Rajahmundry and Sangareddy.

== Soundtrack ==
Chanti

Soundtrack album by Sri
- Released: 2004
- Recorded: 2004
- Genre: Feature film soundtrack
- Label: Aditya Music

No.	Title	Singer(s)	Length
1.	"Konangi Konangi"	Sri, Kalpana	6:05
2.	"Ontlo Netturu"	Anuradha Sriram, Karthik	5:29
3.	"Chemma Chekka"	Kalpana, Grace Karunas, Karthik	4:46
4.	"Rukku Rukku"	Tippu, Mahathi	4:20
5.	"Guppidi Guppidi"	Karthik, Kalpana	4:43
6.	"Mastani Mastani"	Karthik, Anuradha Sriram	5:03

== Reception ==
Jeevi of Idlebrain.com rated the film two-and-a-half out of five and wrote that "This film is a disappointment from Ravi Teja who is branded as minimum guarantee hero for giving ample entertainment to audiences and decent profits for producers". A critic from Full Hyderabad wrote that "Chanti is best left to the fun-loving bunch out in the front rows". Deccan Herald wrote "The script, which looks like a rehash of potboilers churned out by the Telugu film industry in the 1980s, falls flat as it treads the all too predictable path. Even director Shoban, who had won accolades for his previous film Varsham, falters with Chanti". Screen wrote "Director Sobhan chooses an insipid plot and tries to ride on Ravi Teja’s characterisation but it could rebound. [..] Bereft of relevant sub-plots, Shahjahan’s screenplay is repetitive and gives a sense of deja vu."
