= Rachakonda Viswanatha Sastry =

Indian lawyer, writer (1922–1993

Rachakonda Viswanatha Sastri
- రాచకొండ విశ్వనాథ శాస్త్రి
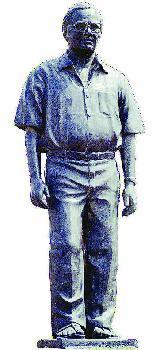
- Born: Rachakonda Viswanatha Sastri; 30 July 1922; Srikakulam, India
- Died: 10 November 1993 (aged 71)
- Occupations: Lawyer, writer
- Years active: 1952–1975
- Relatives: Vishwadev Rachakonda (grandson)

Rachakonda Viswanatha Sastri (Ravi Sastri) (Telugu: రావిశాస్త్రి) (30 July 1922 – 10 November 1993) was a Telugu writer who published several novels and more than 60 short stories in six volumes.

His grandson Vishwadev Rachakonda is an actor.

== See also ==
- List of Indian writers
- List of novelists
- List of short story writers
- List of people from Andhra Pradesh
