= Sashi (film) =

2021 film by Srinivas Naidu Nadikatla

- Release poster
- Directed by: Srinivas Naidu Nadikatla
- Screenplay by: Mani Kumar Chinimilli; I. Ravi (dialogues)
- Story by: Srinivas Naidu Nadikatla
- Produced by: R. P. Varma; Chavali Ramanjaneyulu; Chintalapudi Srinivasa Rao
- Starring: Aadi Saikumar; Surbhi; Rashi Singh
- Cinematography: Amarnath Bommireddy
- Edited by: Satya G.
- Music by: Arun Chiluveru
- Production company: Sri Hanuman Movie Makers
- Release date: 19 March 2021
- Running time: 130 mins
- Country: India
- Language: Telugu

Sashi is a 2021 Indian Telugu-language romantic drama film written and directed by Srinivas Naidu Nadikatla and jointly produced by R. P. Varma, Chavali Ramanjaneyulu and Chintalapudi Srinivasa Rao under the banner of Sri Hanuman Movie Makers. The film features Aadi Saikumar, Rashi Singh and Surbhi in the lead roles. The film was released on 19 March 2021.

== Plot ==
A singer in a local band has issues with anger management and alcohol. A tragedy that occurred in his past tips him over the edge. He then starts stalking a girl whose mental health was impacted due to a similar tragedy that occurred in her life.

== Cast ==
- Aadi Saikumar as Raj a.k.a. Rajkumar
- Surbhi as Sashi
- Shivakumar Ramachandravarapu as Sashi, Raj's best friend.
- Rashi Singh as Sunitha, Raj's friend
- Jayaprakash as Dhora
- Ajay as Ajay, Raj's brother
- Sharanya Pradeep as Padma, Ajay's love-interest
- Tulasi as Raj's mother
- Rajiv Kanakala as Sashi's father
- Sirisha Sougandh as Sashi's mother
- Swapnika as Fathima Bulbul, Sashi’s friend
- Viva Harsha as Raj’s friend
- Vennela Kishore as Sastry, Fathima’s love interest
- Sudharshan as Raj’s friend

== Music ==
The music of the film is composed by Arun Chiluveru.

Track listing
No.	Title	Lyrics	Singer(s)	Length
1.	"Okey Oka Lokam Nuvve"	Chandra Bose	Sid Sriram	3:29
2.	"Dheemthana Dheemthana"	Bhaskarabhatla	Haricharan	4:29
3.	"Vidhine Vidiche"	Vengi	M. M. Keeravani	2:05
4.	"Yevarikogani"	Ananta Sriram	Naresh Iyer, Nayana Iyer	2:34
5.	"Prema Idhi Prema"	Kalyan Chakravarty	Ishaq Vali, Bolt	4:02
6.	"Rane Radhe"	Vengi	Chowraasta Band, Aditi Bhavaraju	4:25
Total length:				21:09

== Reception ==
Ram Venkat Srikar of Cinema Express rated the film 2/5 and termed it an "emotionally hollow drama." Srikar added that, "It is earnest story with a lot of heart buried somewhere under the cliches. Sashi aspires to endow us with an emotional viewing experience but settles for monotony and leaves us indifferent.

The Times of India critic Thadhagath Pathi also rated the film 2 stars of five, stating that it was dull love story which lacked in originality. A reviewer from Eenadu opined that the film had a routine story and screenplay but appreciated the performances of Aadi and Surbhi.

== Home media ==
This movie premiering on Amazon Prime Video. The satellite rights on Star Maa.
