= Kismat (2024 film) =

2024 Indian film by Srinath Badineni

- Theatrical release poster
- Directed by: Srinath Badineni
- Written by: Srinath Badineni
- Produced by: Raju
- Starring: Naresh Agastya; Abhinav Gomatam; Vishwadev Rachakonda; Riya Suman
- Cinematography: Vedaraman Sankaran
- Edited by: Viplav Nyshadam
- Music by: Score; Mark K Robin; Songs; Mark K Robin; Sai Karthik
- Production companies: Comrade Film Factory; Atheera Productions
- Release date: 2 February 2024
- Running time: 128 minutes
- Country: India
- Language: Telugu

Kismat is a 2024 Indian Telugu-language crime comedy film written and directed by Srinath Badineni. The film features Naresh Agastya, Abhinav Gomatam, Vishwadev Rachakonda and Riya Suman in lead roles. Kismat was released on 2 February 2024.

== Cast ==
- Naresh Agastya as Karthik
- Abhinav Gomatam as Abhi
- Vishwadev Rachakonda as Kiran
- Riya Suman as Tanya
- Avasarala Srinivas as S. Vivek
- Ajay Ghosh as Janardhan
- Temper Vamsi as Suri
- Kamal
- Chammak Chandra as T. Shankarayya
- Thagubothu Ramesh
- Yadamma Raju
- Gangavva as Saravva
- Advith
- Padma
- Sri Mani
- Y. Kasi Viswanath as Karthik's father
- Kedar Shankar as Abhi's father
- Racha Ravi as Ravi
- Naga Mahesh
- Sameer as Loknath
- Jordar Sujatha as a News presenter
- Satish Saripalli

== Release ==
Kismat was released on 2 February 2024. Post-theatrical digital streaming rights were acquired by Amazon Prime Video and Aha and was premiered on 1 April 2024.

== Reception ==
Raisa Nasreen of Times Now gave a rating of 2.5 out of 5 and a critic from ABP Desam gave the film a negative review.
