= Mehreen Pirzada =

Indian actress and model (born 1995)

Mehreen Kaur Pirzada
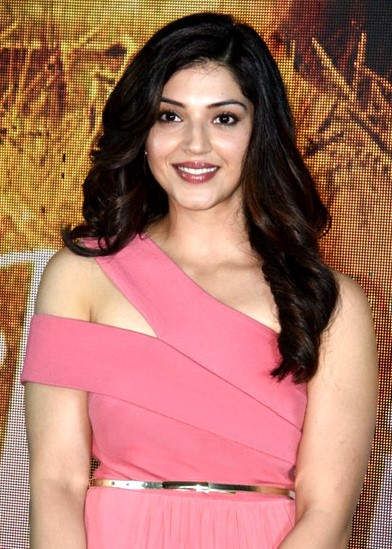
- Pirzada promoting Phillauri in 2017
- Born: Mehreen Kaur Pirzada; 5 November 1994 (age 32); Bathinda, Punjab, India
- Occupations: Actress; model
- Years active: 2016–present
- Spouse: Arsh Aulakh (m.2026)
- Relatives: Gurfateh Pirzada (brother)

Mehreen Kaur Pirzada (born 5 November 1994) is an Indian actress and model who predominantly appears in Telugu, Tamil, Hindi and Punjabi films. Pirzada made her acting debut in 2016 with the Telugu film Krishna Gaadi Veera Prema Gaadha. She made her Hindi debut with Phillauri and Tamil debut with Nenjil Thunivirundhal both in 2017.

Pirzada has appeared in successful Telugu films including Mahanubhavudu (2017), Raja the Great (2017) and F2: Fun and Frustration (2019). She made her Punjabi film debut with DSP Dev in 2019.

== Early life and work ==
Mehreen Pirzada was born on 5 November 1994 in Bathinda, Punjab, India into the Sikh family to an agriculturist and realtor father Gurlal Pirzada and a housewife mother Paramjit Kaur Pirzada. Her only sibling is a brother named Gurfateh Pirzada who is also a model and actor.

Pirzada did her first ramp walk at the age of ten and won the title of Kasauli Princess at a beauty pageant. She was later crowned Miss Personality South Asia Canada 2013 in Toronto, Canada. Pirzada later got a lot of advertising and modelling work.

== Career ==
=== Debut and early success (2016-2017) ===
Pirzada made her acting debut with the 2016 Telugu film Krishna Gaadi Veera Prema Gaadha, in which she played Mahalakshmi opposite Nani. The film was a major box office success. A reviewer of Sify stated that she came up with "decent performance" in her first film. Suresh Kaviryani of Deccan Chronicle noted, "Mehreen has done an excellent job as the female lead and doesn’t look like a debutante at all."

Pirzada had five releases in 2017. She played Anu in her Hindi film Phillauri opposite Suraj Sharma. The film received mixed reviews and was a commercial failure. Andy Webster of The New York Times stated that she brings the "spark". Next, she played Meghana in Mahanubhavudu opposite Sharwanand. Hemanth Kumar of Firstpost said, "Mehreen makes quite an impression." Pirzada then played Lucky opposite Ravi Teja, a major success at box office. After this, she appeared as Janani in the bilingual Nenjil Thunivirundhal, opposite Sundeep Kishan. Lastly, she played Bhargavi opposite Sai Dharam Tej in Jawaan, a commercial failure.

=== Career expansion (2018-2020) ===
In 2018, Pirzada first played Akshara opposite Gopichand in Pantham. Next, she appeared opposite Vijay Deverakonda in NOTA as Swati. She then played Lavanya opposite Bellamkonda Sreenivas in Kavacham. All the three films were commercial failures.

In her first film of 2019, Pirzada played a dominating wife Honey, opposite Varun Tej, in F2: Fun and Frustration. It was a huge commercial success. Krishna Sripaada from The News Minute stated, "While accents are a huge problem, the leading ladies, are funny, especially Mehreen, who gets a lot of mileage out of her role." Next, she made her Punjabi debut with DSP Dev, playing Kirat opposite Dev Kharoud. She reunited with Gopichand in Chanakya, playing Aishwarya. In the same year, she played Shruti opposite Ninja in Ardab Mutiyaran. Manpriya Singh of The Tribune said that she plays her role "remarkably well".

In 2020, Pirzada played Nandhini opposite Nandamuri Kalyan Ram in Entha Manchivaadavuraa. Then, she appeared as Sadhana opposite Dhanush in Pattas, which became a commercial success. The Times of India found her performance to be "lifeless". Her last film of the year saw her playing Neha, opposite Naga Shaurya in Aswathama. 123Telugu wrote "Mehreen doesn’t get much scope to stamp her identity in this film, though she looks at ease in the songs."

=== Fluctuation and recent work (2021-present) ===
In her only film of 2021, Pirzada appeared as Padma in Manchi Rojulochaie opposite Santosh Sobhan. Writing for The New Indian Express, Murali Krishna Ch stated, "Mehreen fails to impress and her expressions are not in sync with the dubbing." In 2022, Pirzada reprised Honey in F3: Fun and Frustration, reuniting with Varun Tej. It emerged as one of the year's highest grossing film.

In 2023, Pirzada made her web debut with Sultan of Delhi, playing Sanjana opposite Tahir Raj Bhasin. Later, she played Lekha in Spark L.I.F.E., opposite Vikrant Reddy. 123telugu noted, "Mehreen looked good and performed well according to her role."

== Personal life ==
Pirzada was engaged to politician Bhavya Bishnoi 2021, after being in a relationship for an year. However, the engagement was called off after four months.

Mehreen Pirzada married Arsh Aulakh in an intimate ceremony on 26 April 2026 in Chail, Himachal Pradesh.

== Filmography ==
Key
†	Denotes films that have not yet been released

=== Films ===
Year	Title	Role	Language(s)	Notes	Ref.
2016	Krishna Gaadi Veera Prema Gaadha	Mahalakshmi	Telugu	Telugu Debut	
2017	Phillauri	Anu Gill	Hindi	Hindi Debut	
2017	Mahanubhavudu	Meghana	Telugu		
2017	Raja the Great	Lucky	Telugu		
2017	Nenjil Thunivirundhal	Janani	Tamil	Tamil Debut	
2017	C/o Surya	Janani	Telugu		
2017	Jawaan	Bhargavi	Telugu		
2018	Pantham	Akshara	Telugu		
2018	NOTA	Swati Mahendran	Tamil		
2018	Kavacham	Lavanya	Telugu		
2019	F2: Fun and Frustration	Honey	Telugu		
2019	DSP Dev	Kirat	Punjabi	Punjabi Debut	
2019	Chanakya	Aishwarya	Telugu		
2019	Ardab Mutiyaran	Shruti Chadda Ahuja	Punjabi		
2020	Entha Manchivaadavuraa	Nandhini	Telugu		
2020	Pattas	Sadhana Sha	Tamil		
2020	Aswathama	Neha	Telugu		
2021	Manchi Rojulochaie	Padma "Paddhu" Tirumalasetty	Telugu		
2022	F3: Fun and Frustration	Honey	Telugu		
2023	Spark Life	Lekha	Telugu		
2025	Indra	Kayal	Tamil		
TBA	Nee Sigoovaregu †	TBA	Kannada	Kannada Debut; Delayed	

=== Television ===
Year	Title	Role	Language	Platform	Ref.
2023	Sultan of Delhi	Sanjana	Hindi	Disney+ Hotstar	

=== Music video appearances ===
Year	Title	Singer(s)	Ref.
2020	"Zara Thehro"	Armaan Malik, Tulsi Kumar	

== Awards and nominations ==
Year	Award	Category	Film	Result	Ref.
2017	6th South Indian International Movie Awards	Best Female Debut – Telugu	Krishna Gaadi Veera Prema Gaadha	Nominated	
2017	Zee Cine Awards Telugu	Entertainer of the Year	Krishna Gaadi Veera Prema Gaadha	Won	
2018	16th Santosham Film Awards	Special Jury Award for Best Actress	Mahanubhavudu	Won	
2018	Zee Telugu Apsara Awards	Rising Star of the Year	Mahanubhavudu	Nominated	
2018	Zee Telugu Apsara Awards	Trendsetter of the Year	—N/a	Won	
2019	66th Filmfare Awards South	Best Supporting Actress – Telugu	Kavacham	Nominated	
