= Manchi Rojulochaie =

2021 film by Maruthi

- Theatrical release poster
- Directed by: Maruthi
- Written by: Maruthi
- Produced by: V Celluloid; Sreenivasa Kumar Naidu (SKN)
- Starring: Santosh Sobhan; Mehreen Pirzada; Ajay Ghosh
- Cinematography: Sai Sriram
- Edited by: S. B. Uddhav
- Music by: Anup Rubens
- Production companies: UV Concepts; Mass Movie Makers
- Release date: 4 November 2021
- Country: India
- Language: Telugu

Manchi Rojulochaie (transl. Good days have come) is a 2021 Indian Telugu-language romantic comedy film written and directed by Maruthi. Produced by UV Concepts (under V Celluloid) and SKN (under Mass Movie Makers), the film starred Santosh Sobhan, Mehreen Pirzada and Ajay Ghosh. Manchi Rojulochaie was released on 4 November 2021, coincinding with the festival of Diwali.

== Plot ==
Santosh (Santosh Sobhan) and Paddu (Mehreen) are in love and they had to move to their native locations from Bengaluru, due to work-from-home during the early Covid times. Gopalam (Ajay Ghosh) is the father of Paddu, who gets influenced by his friends Moorthy and Koti, starts getting worried about his daughter's love affair. Later his worry turns complicated and he starts getting scared of death. How Santhosh tries and solves all the troubles of Gopalam is the story

== Cast ==
- Santosh Sobhan as Santosh "Santu"
- Mehreen Pirzada as Padma "Paddhu" Tirumalasetty
- Ajay Ghosh as Tirumalasetty "Gundu" Gopalam, father of Padma
- Vennela Kishore as Doctor Bava
- Srinivasa Reddy as Broker Srinivas
- Srinivas as Policy Murthy
- Harsha Chemudu as Banda Babu
- Saptagiri as Ambulance Anand
- Rajitha as Gayyali Pellam
- Praveen as Linga Babu
- Satyam Rajesh as Intipakka CI
- Koteswara Rao as Pakkinti Koti
- Sudharshan as Nellore Bammardhi
- Raccha Ravi as Cab driver
- Jabardasth Dorababu
- Jabardasth Sathipandu
- Hemanth

== Soundtrack ==
All music is composed by Anup Rubens.

No.	Title	Lyrics	Singer(s)	Length
1.	"So So Ga"	Krishna Kanth	Sid Sriram	3:26
2.	"Ekkesindi Ekkesindi"	Ananta Sriram	Ram Miriyala	3:17
3.	"Manchi Rojulochaie Title Song"	Kasarla Shyam	Hari Charan, Sravani	3:40
4.	"Kanapadani Divam (Female Version)"	Kasarla Shyam	Sahithi	2:07
5.	"Kanapadani (Male Version)"	Kasarla Shyam	Dhanunjay Seepana	14:08
Total length:				14:23

== Release ==
Manchi Rojulochaie was shot in one month while director Maruthi was on a brief break from shooting his other film Pakka Commercial. The film is Maruthi's first collaboration with Santosh Sobhan, and second collaboration with Mehreen Pirzada. In October 2021, the film's release date was announced as 4 November 2021, coinciding with Deepavali.

== Reception ==
Sravan Vanaparthy of The Times of India gave a rating of 2.5 out of 5 and wrote that "In Manchi Rojulochaie, director Maruthi focuses on societal issues and showcases how a parent would rather believe his gossip-mongering neighbours instead of his own child". Y Sunita Chowdhary of The Hindu opined that the film made a mawkish take on parenthood. She stated: "Though Maruthi chose a nice concept about living in fear, he seems to have lost the balance by creating excessive jokes around a sentiment." Writing for The New Indian Express, Murali Krishna Ch wrote − "Maruthi deserves the credit for delivering straight yet sharp dialogues about life. On the whole, Manchi Rojulochaie is an enjoyable festive entertainer, elevated by its remarkable performances and sharp dialogues". The Hans India rated the film 3 out of 5, praising the performances of lead actors and appreciating Maruthi's work. Mukesh Manjunath of Film Companion wrote, "The film, directed by Maruthi, can't wait to crack jokes and then sprint to the emotional beats."

=== Home media ===
Aha added Manchi Rojulochaie to their catalog and premiered it on 3 December 2021.
