= Ek Mini Katha =

2021 film directed by Karthik Rapolu

- Official release poster
- Directed by: Karthik Rapolu
- Screenplay by: Merlapaka Gandhi; Sheik Dawood G
- Story by: Merlapaka Gandhi
- Produced by: UV Concepts
- Starring: Santosh Sobhan; Kavya Thapar; Shraddha Das
- Cinematography: Gokul Bharathi
- Edited by: Satya G.
- Music by: Pravin Lakkaraju
- Production company: UV Concepts
- Distributed by: Mango Mass Media; Amazon Prime Video
- Release date: 27 May 2021
- Running time: 134 minutes
- Country: India
- Language: Telugu
- Budget: ₹5 crore

Ek Mini Katha (transl. A "Mini" Story (Note: "Ek" being Hindi for one/a and "Katha" being Telugu for story)) is a 2021 Indian Telugu-language adult comedy film directed by debutant Karthik Rapolu and written by Merlapaka Gandhi. Produced by UV Concepts, it stars Santosh Sobhan, Kavya Thapar and Shraddha Das. The film premiered on Amazon Prime Video on 27 May 2021.

== Plot ==
Ram Mohan, a university professor, visits psychiatrist Dr. Satya Kishore and explains his son Santosh's sex addiction and need for counseling. Later, Santosh visits the psychiatrist and explains his past. Santosh, a civil engineer, believes he has a small penis, based on few incidents from his childhood until college. During the same time, his father perceives that Santosh is a sex addict. Santosh is also part of a social media group called SDG and follows different methods, medicines, and devices suggested by members for penis enlargement, but all efforts go in vain. Finally, he opens up about his problem with his colleague, for which Sudarshan suggests going for penis enlargement surgery and arranges an appointment with a urologist. However, the urologist suggests Santosh that it's a high-risk surgery with a success rate of 1-2%. Alternatively, Sudarshan takes him to a prostitute's house to remove Santosh's stigmas and fears. Unfortunately, the house is raided and Santosh is caught. The cop warns Santosh and scolds Ram Mohan about their upbringing.

Enraged, Ram Mohan arranges an alliance with Amrutha. On the day of the meeting at Amrutha's house, Santosh learns that the girl has a code of expressing her rejection by spilling coffee on the man. Santosh falls in love with Amrutha and Amrutha also knew Santosh previously based on an incident where Santosh reveals his positive mindset towards women. Amrutha instantly likes Santosh but accidentally spills coffee on Santosh's pants. Santosh considers this as a rejection and leaves the girl's place. Amrutha meets Santosh again and tries to clarify as a result both start liking each other. Amrutha expresses to Santosh that she has big dreams to which Santosh perceives that Amrutha likes everything big and his small one cannot satisfy her wishes. He tries to explain to Amrutha his problem but fails. But Amrutha likes Santosh's honesty and the marriage gets fixed. Later he decides to get the risky penis enlargement surgery for Amrutha, for which he loans around 15lakh rupees from a local goon. On the day of surgery, the urologist dies in the operation theater due to his heart condition while Santosh is under anesthesia, thus Santosh doesn't get his surgery done as well cannot get back the money for at least one month.

As the marriage date approaches, Santosh decides to reveal the truth to Amrutha. They meet at a joggers park on Valentine's Day. Unfortunately, Santosh's father comes to the same park, seeing Santosh and Amrutha go behind a tree. But they are caught by the right-winged Hindu group that doesn't encourage Valentine's Day. They forcibly get Santosh married to Amrutha and is all covered on live TV which becomes an embarrassment for both families. They come to terms with it and plan a grand reception. During the reception, Amrutha gets to meet all of Santosh's maternal cousins, including Yadagiri who is mad about Santosh, a cousin with suicidal tendencies due to love failure, a TikTok addict girl, and a grandfather who is obsessed with Pooja Hegde. Santosh's father doesn't like them and never allows them to visit his house.

The families plan the first night for the couple, however, Santosh tries to delay it due to his problem. He tricks all his cousins to stay for the next ten days thus delaying it. He also foils the honeymoon trip sponsored by his company by deliberately missing the train. He also learns from his social media group that a new Ayurvedic medicine has come for penis enlargement. Sudarshan goes to get the medicine and brings Sanyaasini to personally deliver the medicine. Shraddha Das says she has to stay at Santosh's house to deliver the medicine personally to him. Sanyaasini instructs Santosh that the medicine is a 7-day course and has to be taken daily at 3 am. She also warns him about the side- effects like excess hunger, rage, and severe stomach ache. Santosh accepts it and starts taking the medicine personally prepared by her. The suicidal cousin along with Ram Mohan suspects that Santosh has an affair with the Shraddha Das. The cousin tries to explain to Amrutha but she never believes it. Side effects have a toll on Santosh's married life, especially with the rage. Sanyaasini also appreciates Santosh's love for Amrutha because he is the only person who has continuously taken the medicine for four days while the rest stopped it within 2 days. On the final day of the course, the medicine gets mixed in lunch preparations thus consumed by all cousins they fight among each other as a side effect. Santosh has sex with Amrutha and realises that she had no complaint on his penis size.

Things go well and Amrutha's family comes to visit her. Unfortunately, the cop who caught Santosh in the raid is Amrutha's uncle and he reveals his encounter with Santosh and his father. Amrutha's family felt cheated and they take her away. Santosh tries to reconcile with her for the past three months but the family doesn't allow him to meet and tries to break the alliance. The psychiatrist listens to Santosh's issue and then he explains that his fears and stigmas are rather mental-oriented and it doesn't have to do anything with his penis size. He suggests Santosh stop worrying about society's perception, stop believing in all kinds of medicines for penis enlargement and immediately meet Amrutha, tell her the truth come or may, and apologize to her. The psychiatrist later meets Ram Mohan and blames him that he failed to understand his son's mental issue and address it. As a result, Santosh alone had to fight his stigma of a small penis for the past twenty years and not killing himself as a saving grace.

Finally, Santosh goes to Amrutha's place, takes a loudspeaker, and expresses his love for her, his fear of having a small penis, but he doesn't care about society anymore. Santosh and Amrutha reconcile, their marriage is saved and have a son. One day the son asks Santosh how are kids born. Realizing his own experience as a child when he asked a similar question to his father, Santosh decides not to have such a situation with his son. So he starts explaining to his son in a way kids understand and in a less controversial manner.

== Cast ==
- Santosh Sobhan as Santosh
- Kavya Thapar as Amrutha
- Shraddha Das as Junior Guruji
- Brahmaji as Ram Mohan, father of Santosh
- Sudharshan as Darshan, Santosh's friend
- Saptagiri as Yadagiri / Lorry Giri, Santosh's cousin
- Posani Krishna Murali as Dr. Surya Prakash (cameo appearance)
- Harsha Vardhan as Psychiatrist G. Satya Kishore
- Duvvasi Mohan as Priest
- C. V. L. Narasimha Rao
- Rupa Lakshmi as Subhadra
- Jeevan Kumar

== Production ==
The film is produced by UV Concepts, a subsidiary of UV Creations. Filming was done in early 2021. Merlapaka Gandhi is the writer of the film. Some portions of the film were shot at Durgam Cheruvu Bridge and Hyderabad metro. It was initially planned to release in cinemas. Due to the COVID-19 lockdown in India, the film's release was indefinitely postponed. Later, it was confirmed that the Prime Video has bought the streaming rights of the film for ₹9 crore (equivalent to ₹10 crore or US$1.0 million in 2023).

== Soundtrack ==
Ek Mini Katha

Soundtrack album by Praveen Lakkaraju
- Recorded: 2021
- Studios: Shade Studios, Hyderabad; Tashi Recording Inn United States
- Genre: Romance
- Label: Mango Music
- Producer: Praveen Lakkaraju

Praveen Lakkaraju chronology
O Pitta Katha (2020)	Ek Mini Katha (2021)

The music of the film is released under the Mango Music label. The lyrical video of the first single "Ee Maya Lo" is released on 18 March 2021. The second single "Saamiranga" is released on 21 April 2021. Yash has choreographed the song. Sreejo had written lyrics for two songs of the film.

All music is composed by Praveen Lakkaraju.

No.	Title	Lyrics	Singer (s)	Length
1.	"Ee Maya Lo"	Sreejo	Lipsika, Sweekar Agasthi	3:40
2.	"Saamiranga"	Sreejo	Prudhvi Chandra	2:30
3.	"I Hate My Life'u"	Bhaskarabhatla	Hema Chandra	3:37

== Release ==
The film was earlier scheduled for theatrical release on 30 April 2021. Later, due to COVID-19 pandemic, the film was released on Amazon Prime Video on 27 May 2021.

== Reception ==
Sangeetha Devi Dundoo of The Hindu gave a mixed response for the film with exception of lead actor's acting. The Indian Express critic Manoj Kumar R called it a half-baked comedy on matters of size.

Ramya Palisetty of India Today wrote that Ek Mini Katha begins by offering us something new but fails to deliver in the end. Baradwaj Rangan felt that the film needs much sharper writing and wrote "apart from the climax, the film is neither limp nor hard-hitting."
