= Purushottama Patnam =

Purushottama Patnam is a village situated on National Highway No.5 at Chilakaluripet and also on the banks of Ogeru vaagu. Ogeru vaagu is also called the Omkareswara River. Maha Siva Rathri is one of the major festivals during which villagers erect "Prabha", which are flat cone-like structures made from bamboo sticks and decorated with flowers and pictures.
