= Like, Share & Subscribe =

Indian Telugu-language adventure comedy film

- Theatrical release poster
- Directed by: Merlapaka Gandhi
- Produced by: Venkat Boyanapalli
- Starring: Santosh Sobhan; Faria Abdullah
- Cinematography: A. Vasanth
- Edited by: Ramu Tumu
- Music by: Praveen Lakkaraju; Ram Miriyala
- Production companies: Aamuktha Creations; Niharika Entertainment
- Release date: 4 November 2022
- Running time: 134 minutes
- Country: India
- Language: Telugu

Like, Share & Subscribe is a 2022 Indian Telugu-language adventure comedy film directed by Merlapaka Gandhi.

== Cast ==
- Santosh Sobhan as Viplav
- Faria Abdullah as Vasudha
- Subhalekha Sudhakar as Home Minister
- Brahmaji as Brahmanna
- Sudharshan as Jack Daniels
- Naren as DGP Narendra Varma
- Mime Gopi as PPF Commander Gopanna
- Raghu Babu as Prasad Rao
- Saptagiri as Film critic
- Babloo as Brahmanna's follower
- Mirchi Kiran as Brahmanna's follower
- Govind Padmasoorya as Police Officer

== Soundtrack ==
The music was composed by Praveen Lakkaraju with one song composed by Ram Miriyala.

Track listing
No.	Title	Music	Singer(s)	Length
1.	"Like Share Subscribe"	Praveen Lakkaraju	Sweekar Agasthi	2:58
2.	"Emanti Nabayaa"	Praveen Lakkaraju	Mangli, Penchal Das	3:37
3.	"Lachamammo"	Ram Miriyala	Ram Miriyala, Gorati Venkanna	3:48
4.	"Idhi Manakey Sadhyam"	Praveen Lakkaraju	Hymath Mohammed, Arun Kaundinya, Srimani	3:10
Total length:				13:33

== Reception ==
A critic from The Times of India wrote that "Merlapaka Gandhi’s Like, Share & Subscribe is unfortunately the kind of film that had the potential to be mindless fun, if only it had better writing". A critic from The Hans India wrote that "Director Merlapaka Gandhi falters heavily regarding the screenplay. His thought to provide more entertainment kills the movie’s soul, and hence the film squanders around inconsistently". A critic from Telugucinema.com wrote that "The film suffers from a lack of seriousness in its approach to the story and narrative. What appeared to be a light-hearted film devolves into a clumsy attempt".
