= Harimohan Paruvu =

Harimohan Paruvu (born 14 August 1967) is an Indian author, former cricketer, columnist, screenwriter and motivational speaker, known for his English-language books centered on the game of Cricket.

== Early life, education and early career ==
Harimohan was born in Hyderabad. His father worked with Railways. He graduated from Osmania Engineering College. He finished his MBA from the Osmania University College of Commerce and Business Management, Hyderabad in India. He played cricket from a very young age and has represented Hyderabad and Osmania Cricket Teams. He has represented Hyderabad in Ranji Trophy and won Hyderabad the trophy after 50 long years.

He worked in IDBI Bank as an Investment Banker for nearly a decade, later opted out to focus full-time on his writing career.

== Career ==
He started his career in writing with India's first cricket-themed book named The Men Within. The book was received well by critics and general readers.

His book, The Men Within was adapted into the movie Golkonda High School. Harimohan worked a consultant for the film.

== Bibliography ==
- Men Within (2006)
- If you love someone (2010)
- 50 Not Out ! (2015)
- This Way is Easier Dad (2017)
- The Renaissance Man (2019)

== Filmography ==
Golkonda High School
