= Baby (2023 soundtrack) =

Soundtrack album by Vijai Bulganin
- Released: 6 July 2023
- Recorded: 2020–2023
- Genre: Feature film soundtrack
- Length: 36:43
- Language: Telugu
- Label: Sony Music India
- Producer: Vijai Bulganin

Vijai Bulganin chronology
| Meet Cute (2022) | Baby (2023) | Vidyarthi (2023) |

Singles from Baby
- 1. "O Rendu Prema Meghaalila" Released: 21 December 2022; 2. "O Rendu Prema Meghaalila (Reprise)" Released: 19 January 2023; 3. "Deva Raaja" Released: 3 April 2023; 4. "Premisthunna" Released: 15 May 2023; 5. "Ribapappa" Released: 16 June 2023

Baby is the soundtrack album composed by Vijai Bulganin to the 2023 Telugu-language coming of age romantic drama film of the same name directed by Sai Rajesh and produced by Sreenivasa Kumar Naidu, starring Anand Deverakonda, Vaishnavi Chaitanya and Viraj Ashwin. The soundtrack featured seven songs with lyrics written Anantha Sriram, Kalyan Chakravarthy and Suresh Banisetti. Led by five singles, the album was released under the Sony Music India label on 6 July 2023. The music received positive reviews from critics and fetched Bulganin his maiden Filmfare Award for Best Music Director – Telugu, while P V N S Rohit, who sang "Premisthunna" won the National Film Award for Best Male Playback Singer.

== Development ==
Vijai Bulganin composed the film score and soundtrack. Rajesh had known Vijai since 2016, when he was composing for Saptagiri Express (2016). During the COVID-19 pandemic, Rajesh narrated the film's story of Baby through Zoom call and said that he wanted music that would resonate with people who love the melodious tunes of Ilaiyaraaja. Vijai, who had grown up with the music of Ilaiyaraaja, A. R. Rahman and M. M. Keeravani admitted to compose melodic tunes based on the style, as he had learnt Indian classical and Western classical music during his studies.

After narrating the ideas and song situations, Rajesh asked him to compose a rough tune so that he can send it to the producer Sreenivasa Kumar Naidu. Though Rajesh wanted a song based on the easiest situation, he had however composed a tune based on a toughest situation so that he could impress Rajesh first and have faith in him. That song turned out to be "Premisthunna". Vijai and Rajesh had shared a rapport throughout the production process, with the latter providing great inputs. The inclusion of kids chorus in "O Rendu Prema Meghaalila" was based on Rajesh's idea with the chorus part in "Anjali Anjali" from Anjali (1990) served as the reference point.

Vijai had avoided techno plug-ins for scoring and went ahead with live recording for violin, flute and string instruments. The arrangement of strings were recreated with the style of Ilaiyaraaja's works, as the album considered as the homage of the veteran composer. The song "Deva Raaja" is a mixture of Carnatic music fused with EDM beats which he considered "challenging and exciting". The pallavi set the foundation for the rest of the song. For the song "Ribapappa", which was composed during mid-2020, Vijai wanted veteran singer S. P. Balasubrahmanyam to record the song but could not do so owing to his untimely death in September 2020. The song was later sung by Sri Krishna. The soundtrack consisted of seven songs and two smaller compositions.

== Release ==
The first song "O Rendu Prema Meghaalila" was released on 21 December 2022. A reprised version of the song was released a month later on 19 January 2023. The third song "Deva Raaja" was released on 3 April 2023. The fourth song "Premisthunna" was launched at event on 15 May, preceded by Rashmika Mandanna as the chief guest. The fourth song "Ribapappa" was launched on 16 June. The soundtrack was released on 6 July under the Sony Music India label. After the film's release, the songs "Chandamama" and "Vaishnavi Celebration Dance" were unveiled as bonus tracks, respectively on 9 August and 18 August, respectively.

== Track listing ==
| No. | Title | Lyrics | Singer(s) | Length |
|---|---|---|---|---|
| 1. | "O Rendu Prema Meghaalila" | Anantha Sriram | Sreerama Chandra | 5:16 |
| 2. | "O Rendu Prema Meghaalila" (Reprise) | Anantha Sriram | Sreerama Chandra | 5:25 |
| 3. | "Deva Raaja" | Kalyan Chakravarthy | Arya Dhayal | 5:43 |
| 4. | "Premisthunna" | Suresh Banisetti | P V N S Rohit | 6:37 |
| 5. | "Ribapappa" | Suresh Banisetti | Sri Krishna | 5:04 |
| 6. | "Chanti Pillala" | Suresh Banisetti | Anudeep Dev | 5:10 |
| 7. | "Kalakalame" | Suresh Banisetti | Sahithi Chaganti | 3:28 |
| Total length: | | | | 36:43 |

Bonus tracks
| No. | Title | Lyrics | Singer(s) | Length |
|---|---|---|---|---|
| 8. | "Chandamama" | Suresh Banisetti | Deepu | 5:51 |
| 9. | "Vaishnavi Celebration Dance" | — | — | 1:29 |
| Total length: | | | | 44:03 |

== Reception ==
=== Critical response ===
Abhilasha Cherukuri of Cinema Express wrote "The music of the film, composed by Vijai Bulganin, helps immensely, elevating the story even when the actors are struggling to find their feet." Raghu Bandi of The Indian Express wrote "Vijay Bulganin’s songs and background score perfectly fit and elevate the mood throughout". B. V. S. Prakash of Deccan Chronicle wrote "Music of Vijay Bulganin is impressive and background score spot on". Neeshita Nyayapati of The Times of India stated that Vijai Bulganin's score enhanced the actors' performances and "the songs too don’t feel like a hinderance". Critic based at The Hans India stated "The film’s songs have been trending all over social media even before the release of the movie. The music by Vijai Bulganin has been extraordinary and has lifted the mood and emotions behind the performances. The composition of music and background by Vijai Bulganin has to be one of the best highlights of the whole movie."

=== Chart performance ===
| Chart | Song | Peak position | Ref. |
|---|---|---|---|
| India (Billboard) | "O Rendu Prema Meghaalila" | 11 | |
| India (Billboard) | "Premisthunna" | 20 | |
| Asian Music Chart (OCC) | "O Rendu Prema Meghaalila" | 8 | |
| Asian Music Chart (OCC) | "Premisthunna" | 23 | |

=== Accolades ===
Accolades for Baby (soundtrack)
| Award (Note: Awards, festivals and organizations are in alphabetical order.) | Date of ceremony (Note: Date is linked to the article about the awards held that year, wherever possible.) | Category | Recipient(s) | Result | Ref. |
|---|---|---|---|---|---|
| Filmfare Awards South | 3 August 2024 | Best Music Director – Telugu | Vijai Bulganin | Won | |
| Filmfare Awards South | 3 August 2024 | Best Lyricist – Telugu | Anantha Sriram ("O Rendu Prema Meghaalila") | Won | |
| Filmfare Awards South | 3 August 2024 | Best Male Playback Singer – Telugu | P V N S Rohit ("Premisthunna") | Nominated | |
| Filmfare Awards South | 3 August 2024 | Best Male Playback Singer – Telugu | Sreerama Chandra ("O Rendu Prema Meghaalila") | Won | |
| National Film Awards | 1 August 2025 | Best Male Playback Singer | P V N S Rohit ("Premisthunna") | Won | |
| South Indian International Movie Awards | 14 September 2024 | Best Music Director – Telugu | Vijai Bulganin | Nominated | |
| South Indian International Movie Awards | 14 September 2024 | Best Lyricist – Telugu | Anantha Sriram ("O Rendu Prema Meghaalila") | Won | |
