= Dhanunjay Seepana =

Indian playback singer

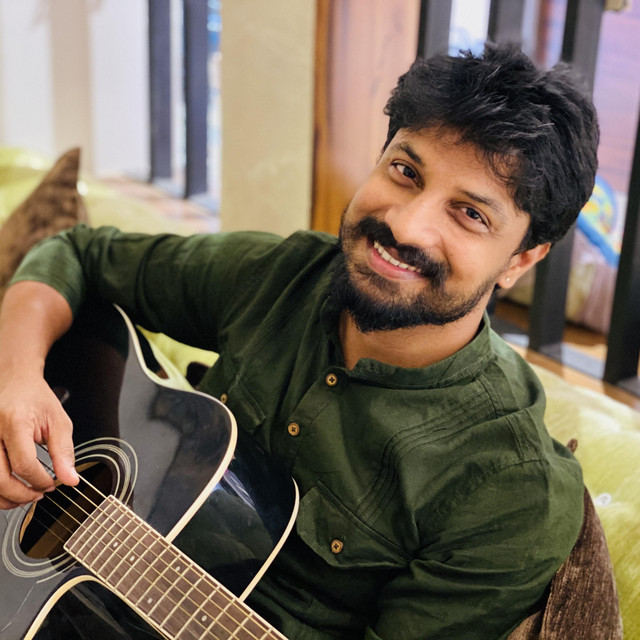
- Dhanunjay Seepana

Background information
- Born: 24 May 1986 (age 40); Srikakulam, Andhra Pradesh, India
- Occupation: playback singer
- Instrument: Vocals
- Years active: 2012–present
- Spouse: Priyanka Sampathi Rao (m. 2013)

Dhanunjay Seepana is an Indian playback singer, primarily associated with Telugu cinema.

== Career ==
Dhanunjay began his career in playback singing through reality shows and chorus work, gaining initial recognition with Ramana Gogula’s 1000 Abaddalu. Over the years, he has worked with music directors like Anup Rubens, S Thaman, and Mani Sharma, contributing to many tracks.

Dhanunjay worked with composers across the Telugu cinema industry. He has had classical training.

== Filmfare Award nominations ==
Dhanunjay has been nominated for prestigious Filmfare Awards South in the Best Male Playback Singer category:

- 2015 nominee for Gopala Gopala – "Bhaje Bhaje"
- 2016 nominee for Sarrainodu – "You Are My MLA"

== Discography ==
- Note: (D) indicates dubbed version.

Year	Film	Song	Composer	Notes
2012	Oka Romantic Crime Katha	"Chesuko Majaa Jalsa"	Praveen Immadi	
2013	Sukumarudu	"Sukumarudu"	Anup Rubens	
2013	1000 Abaddalu	"Abaddalu" "Aggipulla Vaithe" "Konte Konte"	Ramana Gogula	
2013	Gunde Jaari Gallanthayyinde	"Ding Ding Ding"	Anup Rubens	
2014	Raghuvaran B.Tech (D)	"Po Pove Yekantham"	Anirudh Ravichander	
2014	Loukyam	"Soodu Soodu"	Anup Rubens	
2015	Temper	"Ittage Rechchipodam"	Anup Rubens	
2015	Gopala Gopala	"Bhaje Bhaje"	Anup Rubens	
2016	Krishnashtami	"Bava Bava Panneeru"	Dinesh	
2016	Sarrainodu	"You Are My MLA"	Thaman S	
2016	Soggade Chinni Nayana	"Dikka Dikka Dum Dum" "Nee Navve"	Anup Rubens	
2016	Babu Bangaram	"Dillunna Vade"	Ghibran	
2016	Ekkadiki Pothavu Chinnavada	"Vandha Speed Lo"	Shekar Chandra	
2016	Hyper	"Ompula Dhaniya" "Hypere Hypere"	Ghibran	
2016	Intlo Deyyam Nakem Bhayam	"Paddanu Indumati"	Sai Karthik	
2016	ISM	"Yey Yey Yeyra"	Anup Rubens	
2016	Raja Cheyyi Vesthe	"Kottu Kottu"	Sai Karthik	
2016	Naga Bharanam	"Siva Shankaraavvam"	Gurukiran	
2016	C/O Godavari	"Padara"	Raghu Kunche	
2017	Next Nuvve	"Arey Life Ante"	Sai Karthik	
2017	Ungarala Rambabu	"Allari Pillagada"	Ghibran	
2017	Rarandoi Veduka Chudham	"Break Up"	Devi Sri Prasad	
2017	Om Namo Venkatesaya	"Govinda Hari Govinda"	MM Keeravani	
2017	Darsakudu	"Thikkalo Screenplay"	Sai Karthik	
2017	Andhhagadu	"Debbaki Poye Poye"	Shekar Chandra	
2017	Katamarayudu	"Yelo Yedarilo" "Jivvu Jivvu"	Anup Rubens	
2018	Subrahmanyapuram	"Friendship"	Shekar Chandra	
2018	Srinivasa Kalyanam	"Ekkada Nuvvunte"	Mickey J. Meyer	
2018	Happy Wedding	"It’s a Beautiful Day"	Shakthikanth Karthick	
2018	Achari America Yatra	"Aachari America Yatra"	Thaman S	
2019	Tenali Ramakrishna BA. BL	"Kurnoolu Katthiva"	Sai Karthik	
2019	Burra Katha	"Anaganaga"	Sai Karthik	
2019	Lovers Day	"Forever Friend"	Shaan Rehman	
2020	Bheeshma	"Whattey Beauty"	Mahathi Swarasagar	
2020	30 Rojullo Preminchadam Ela	"Neko Dhandam"	Anup Rubens	
2021	Uniki	"Jadatho Jagartha"	Peddapalli Rohith	
2021	Republic	"Gaana of Republic"	Mani Sharma	
2021	Manchi Rojulochaie	"Kanapadani Diavam"	Anup Rubens	
2021	Maestro	"La La La La"	Mahathi Swarasagar	
2021	Narappa	"Ooo Narappa"	Mani Sharma	
2021	Minnal Murali (D)	"Andaala Jeevitham"	Shaan Rehman	
2021	Sridevi Soda Center	"Mandhuloda"	Mani Sharma	
2022	Badava Rascal (D)	"Aagagi Pola Maaruthonde"	Vasuki Vaibhav	
2022	Bhala Thandanana	"Meenaacchee"	Mani Sharma	
2022	Thiru (D)	"Naa Madhi"	Anirudh Ravichander	
2022	Thiru (D)	"Maikama"	Anirudh Ravichander	
2022	Bangarraju	"Laddunda"	Anup Rubens	
2022	Love Failure	"Pove Ekaantham"	Prince Henry	
2022	Oka Chinna Family Story	"Orey Mahesha"	PK Dandi	
2022	Manu Charitra	"Ekkada Untadhiro"	Gopi Sundar	
2022	Writer Padmabhushan	"Kannullo Nee Roopame"	Shekar Chandra	
2022	Welcome to Tihar College	"College Age Lona"	Praveen Immadi	
2023	Mr. King	"Ra Ra Naa Mama"	Mani Sharma	
2023	Rebels of Thupakulagudem	"Adavilona Aadapilla"	Mani Sharma	
2023	Jilebi	"Hey Madhumathi" "Chamkaare Chamka"	Mani Sharma	
2024	Kismat	"Chanchalguda"	Sai Karthik	
2024	Aa Okkati Adakku	"Rajadhi Raja"	Gopi Sunder	
2024	Bhale Unnade	"Aadillaki Aamada Dooram"	Shekar Chandra	
2024	Sarangadhariya	"Entha Andamo"	Ebenezer Paul	
2024	Double iSmart	"Kya Lafda"	Mani Sharma	
2024	Shivam Bhaje	"Ori Devuda"	Vikas Badisa	
2024	Pranaya Godari	"Thellaru Poddullo"	Markandeya Paramalla	
2025	Nidurinchu Jahapana	"Hailesso Hailessa"	Anup Rubens	
2025	Mazaka	"Bachelors Anthem"	Leon James	
2025	LYF: Love Your Father	"Party Song"	Mani Sharma	
2025	Jaat	"Oh Rama Shri Rama"	Thaman S	Hindi film
2025	Kothapallilo Okappudu	"Ranga Nayaki"	Mani Sharma	
2025	Oka Brundavanam	"Pasi Pranam"	Sunny–Saketh	
2025	Madharaasi (D)	"Selavika"	Anirudh Ravichander	
2025	Beauty	"Nenevare Nenevare"	Vijai Bulganin	
2025	Kanya Kumari	"Kathilanti Pillave"	Ravi Nidamarthy	
2025	Mithra Mandali	"Swecha Standuu"	RR Dhruvan	
2026	Sahakutumbaanaam	"Adhi Dha Saaru"	Mani Sharma	
