= P V N S Rohit =

Indian singer

- Born: 22 December 1991 (age 34); Andhra Pradesh, India
- Genres: World music; Pop music; Indian folk
- Occupations: Music composer; singer; lyricist; performer
- Instrument: Vocals
- Years active: 2010–present
- Labels: Aditya Music; Lahari Music; Madhura Audio; Sony Music

P V N S Rohit is an Indian playback singer, record producer, music composer and songwriter in Telugu cinema. After appearing in reality singing shows such as Padutha Theeyaga (2012–2013) and Indian Idol (2016–2017), Rohit began playback singing as a chorus artist and later as a lead singer. His most popular songs include "Obulamma" from Konda Polam (2021) and "Premisthunna" from Baby (2023). His performance in the song "Premisthunna" won him the National Film Award for Best Male Playback Singer.

== Career ==
Rohit was trained in the Carnatic music and was taking lessons from V Balasubramanium since he was 10 years old. He had also learnt Hindustani classical music. He have been taught light music by Komanduri Ramachari.

== Discography ==
=== Film songs ===
List of songs recorded
Year	Song	Work	Composer	Notes
2017	"Hailo Hailessare"	Sathamanam Bhavati	Mickey J. Meyer	
2018	"Why Not"	Savyasachi	M. M. Keeravani	
2018	"Praana Brundhavanam"	24 Kisses	Joi Barua	
2018	"Ee Samayam Naa Hrudhayam"	24 Kisses	Joi Barua	
2018	"Sri Lakshmi Raave"	24 Kisses	Joi Barua	
2018	"Emo Emo Emoo" (Reprised)	Devadas	Mani Sharma	
2019	"First Time Heart Beat"	Prema Katha Chitram 2	Jeevan Babu	
2020	"Oohinchani Maayena"	Rave Naa Cheliya	M M Kumar	
2020	"Gundegilli"	Kanulu Kanulanu Dhochaayante	Masala Coffee	Dubbed version
2021	"GO Corona"	Zombie Reddy	Mark K. Robin	Chorus
2021	"Zombie Reddy Theme"	Zombie Reddy	Mark K. Robin	Chorus
2021	"Obulamma"	Konda Polam	M. M. Keeravani	
2021	"Shwaasalo"	Konda Polam	M. M. Keeravani	
2021	"Priyuraala"	Priyuraalu	Sunil Kashyap	
2022	"Thippagalana"	Jayamma Panchayathi	M. M. Keeravani	
2022	"Manase Nee Kosam"	Sakala Gunabirama	Anudeep Dev	
2022	"Saagene"	Once Upon a Time in Devarakonda	Arjun Janya	Dubbed version
2023	"Padham Parugulu"	Maruva Tarama	Vijai Bulganin	
2023	"Prematho"	Japan	G. V. Prakash Kumar	Dubbed version
2023	"Premisthunna"	Baby	Vijai Bulganin	
2023	"Theme of BRO"	Bro	Thaman S	
2023	"Bandhamele"	Jailer	Anirudh Ravichander	Dubbed version
2023	"Vennilavin"	Jailer	Anirudh Ravichander	Malayalam version
2023	"Bandhaviduve"	Jailer	Anirudh Ravichander	Kannada version
2023	"Tu Mera Hai"	Jailer	Anirudh Ravichander	Hindi version
2023	"Pathanam"	Tantiram	Ajay Arasada	
2024	"Chitty Kudiye"	Premalu	Vishnu Vijay	Dubbed version
2024	"Oo Baatasari"	Committee Kurrollu	Anudeep Dev	
2024	"Malupero"	Saripodhaa Sanivaaram	Jakes Bejoy	
2024	"Sa Ri Ma Pa"	Surya's Saturday	Jakes Bejoy	Tamil version
2024	"Sa Ri Ma Pa"	Surya's Saturday	Jakes Bejoy	Kannada version
2024	"Sa Ri Ma Pa"	Surya's Saturday	Jakes Bejoy	Hindi version
2024	"Naa Kannule"	Sarangadhariya	M. Ebenezer Paul	
2024	"Kadilite Nadilaaga"	Anu	Ghantasala Viswanath	
2024	"Pilichina Bandhame"	Aarambham	Sinjith Yerramilli	
2024	"Galeez"	Roti Kapda Romance	Harshavardhan Rameshwar	
2024	"Thaara Theerame"	Eesaraina	The Tej	
2024	"Oho Oho"	Sopathulu	Sinjith Yerramilli	
2024	"Emito Emito"	Sasivadane	Saravana Vasudevan	
2025	"Manasa Manasa"	Return of the Dragon	Leon James	Dubbed version
2025	"Hey Madhumathi"	LYF: Love Your Father	Mani Sharma	
2025	"Evaradi Evaradi"	Hari Hara Veera Mallu	M. M. Keeravani	
2025	"Salasala Marige"	Hari Hara Veera Mallu	M. M. Keeravani	
2025	"Yaarivanu Yaarivanu"	Hari Hara Veera Mallu	M. M. Keeravani	Kannada version
2025	"Kudhi Kudhuyithe"	Hari Hara Veera Mallu	M. M. Keeravani	Kannada version
2025	"Udamagal Vazhigal"	Hari Hara Veera Mallu	M. M. Keeravani	Tamil version
2025	"Vinavidum Kurale"	Hari Hara Veera Mallu	M. M. Keeravani	Tamil version
2025	"Agan Hai Agan Hai"	Hari Hara Veera Mallu	M. M. Keeravani	Hindi version
2025	"Jal Jal Ke Kyu"	Hari Hara Veera Mallu	M. M. Keeravani	Hindi version
2025	"Laali Laali"	Kousalya Tanaya Raghava	Rajesh Raj Thelu	
2025	"Bhaga Bhaga"	Ari: My Name is Nobody	Anup Rubens	
2025	"Kalalanni"	3BHK	Amrit Ramnath	Dubbed version
2025	"Pretty Pretty"	Beauty	Vijai Bulganin	

=== Non-film songs / Singles ===
As lead artist
Year	Song	Album	Singer	Composer	Lyrics	Co-artist(s)
2017	"Akhilandakoti"	Swamy Saranam Ayyappa	Yes	No	No	
2018	"Shiridi Lo"	Sai Madhuram	Yes	No	No	
2021	"Ayya"	–	Yes	No	No	Hemachandra, Roll Rida
2022	"Thanuvantha"	–	Yes	No	No	
2023	"Kaatuka Kallakettinaave"	–	Yes	Yes	Yes	Sahithi Chaganti
2023	"Bujji Kuna"	–	Yes	No	No	
2023	"Chinnari Chinnari"	From The Bottom of My Heart	Yes	No	No	
2024	"Hanuman Chalisa"	The Legend of Hanuman	Yes	No	No	Kaala Bhairava, Manoj Sharma, Arun Kaundinya, Hymath Mohammed, Lokeshwar, Ravi Prakash, Sai Saket
2025	"Manasantha"	–	Yes	Yes	No	BVK Vagdevi
2025	"Varshapu Vennela"	–	Yes	No	No	Pallavi Annavajjala
2025	"Kahani Meri"	–	No	Yes	No	Hindi song

== Television ==
Year	Title	Role	Network	Language	Notes
	Paadalani Undi	Participant	MAA TV	Telugu	
2012–2013	Padutha Theeyaga	Participant	ETV	Telugu	
2016–2017	Indian Idol	Participant	Sony TV	Hindi	2nd Runner-up
2017–2021	Swarabhishekam	Performer	ETV	Telugu	
2021	Sa Re Ga Ma Pa The Singing Superstar	Performer	Zee Telugu	Telugu	
2022	Padutha Theeyaga	Performer	ETV	Telugu	
2024	Telugu Indian Idol	Performer	Aha	Telugu	
2024	Sa Re Ga Ma Pa The Next Singing Youth Icon	Performer	Zee Telugu	Telugu	Episode 8

== Awards and nominations ==
Award	Year	Category	Work	Result	Ref.
Filmfare Awards South	2024	Best Male Playback Singer – Telugu	"Premisthunna" (from Baby)	Nominated	
National Film Awards	2025	Best Male Playback Singer	"Premisthunna" (from Baby)	Won	
