= Muralidhar Goud =

Indian actor

- Born: Ramayampet, Andhra Pradesh (now in Telangana), India
- Occupation: Actor
- Years active: 2018–present

Ireni Muralidhar Goud is an Indian actor who works in Telugu cinema. His breakthrough came with his performance in DJ Tillu (2022) and Balagam (2023).

== Personal life ==
Goud hails from Ramayampet, Telangana and completed his education in Siddipet. He worked as a Junior Accounts Officer at the Electricity Board of the Mint Compound in Hyderabad until retirement, after which he pursued a career in films.

== Career ==
He began his career with small roles in television shows. Goud’s first breakthrough role in film came through with DJ Tillu (2022). He went on to reprise his role in its Tillu Square (2024) as well. Speaking about his role as Tillu’s father, Abhilasha Cherukuri of The New Indian Express wrote that Goud emerged in "steady form without missing a single beat." Jeevi of Idlebrain.com wrote that Goud is naturally talented and praised his comic timing. Speaking about his role in Mad (2023), Sangeetha Devi Dundoo of The Hindu stated that, "Muralidhar is easily one of the best actors in Telugu cinema today to play the frustrated father who delivers snarky lines with a deadpan expression."

== Filmography ==
Year	Title	Role	Notes
2018	Rangasthalam		
2018	Aatagallu		
2018	Antariksham 9000 KMPH		
2019	NTR: Kathanayakudu	Tanguturu Anjaiah	
2019	Marshal		
2021	Climax		
2021	Pitta Kathalu	Ex-MLA	"Ramula" segment
2022	The American Dream		
2022	DJ Tillu	Tillu's father	
2023	Mem Famous	Sarpanch Yella Reddy	
2023	Pareshan	Samarpan	
2023	Unstoppable	Kohinoor Kalyan's father	
2023	Slum Dog Husband	Mounika's father	
2023	Mad	Ganesh's father	
2023	Bhagavanth Kesari	Jogi	
2023	Das Ka Dhamki	Sanjay's pretending father	
2023	Mangalavaaram		
2023	Balagam	Narayana	
2024	Babu		
2024	Tillu Square	Tillu's father	
2024	Music Shop Murthy		
2024	Padmavyuham Lo Chakradhari	840 Ramakrishna	
2024	Darling	Raghav's father	
2024	Pekamedalu	Varalaxmi's relative	
2024	Bhavanam		
2024	Ramnagar Bunny	Bunny’s father	
2024	Pushpa 2	Jewellery shop owner	
2024	Srikakulam Sherlock Holmes	Michael Raj	
2025	Sankranthiki Vasthunam	Bhagyam's father	
2025	Pelli Kani Prasad	Prasad’s father	
2025	Mad Square	Ganesh's father	
2025	Akkada Ammayi Ikkada Abbayi	Krishna’s father	
2025	Shashtipoorthi		
2025	Kingdom	SI Ramulu	
2025	Kanya Kumari	Bride’s father	
2025	Constable	Doctor	
2025	K-Ramp	Daniel	
2025	Santhana Prapthirasthu	Eshwar Rao	
2025	Jigris	Karthik’s father	
2025	School Life		
2025	Champion	Kistayya	
2025	Dhandoraa	Babai	
2026	Bhartha Mahasayulaku Wignyapthi	Kamalasan Naidu	
2026	Funky	Doctor	
2026	Korean Kanakaraju	Kishtappa’s father	
2026	KJQ: King Jackie Queen	Chacha	
2026	Mension House Mallesh		
2026	Comrade Kalyan	Sitara Devi's Father	
2026	Barabar Premistha		
2026	Venkatramaiah Gari Taluka	Venkatramaiah	
2026	Pallaburusu		

=== Television ===
Year	Title	Role	Network
2024	Brinda	Postmortem Surgeon	SonyLIV
2025	Sivarapalli	Mitta Sudhakar	Amazon Prime Video

== Awards and nominations ==
Year	Award	Category	Work	Result	Ref.
2023	Filmfare Awards South	Best Supporting Actor – Telugu	DJ Tillu	Nominated	
2023	South Indian International Movie Awards	Best Supporting Actor – Telugu	DJ Tillu	Nominated	
