= Committee Kurrollu =

2024 Indian film by Yadhu Vamsi

- Theatrical release poster
- Directed by: Yadhu Vamsi
- Written by: Yadhu Vamsi, Venkata Subhash Cheerla (Dialogues), Kondalrao Addagalla (Dialogues)
- Produced by: Padmaja Konidela; Jayalakshmi Adapaka
- Starring: Sandeep Saroj; P. Sai Kumar; Goparaju Ramana; Trinadh Varma; Prasad Behara; Raadhya; Yaswanth Pendyala; Eshwar Rachiraju; Lokesh Kumar Parimi; Teena Sravya; Tejaswi Rao; Shyam Kalyan; Raghuvaran; Shiva Kumar matta; Manikantta parusu; Shashank Mannam; Hemanth Mulagala
- Cinematography: Edurolu Raju
- Edited by: Anwar Ali
- Music by: Anudeep Dev
- Production companies: Pink Elephant Pictures; Shree Radha Damodar Studios
- Release date: 9 August 2024
- Country: India
- Language: Telugu
- Box office: ₹25crore

Committee Kurrollu (transl. Committee Guys) is a 2024 Indian Telugu-language comedy drama film written and directed by debutant Yadhu Vamsi.

Produced by Pink Elephant Pictures and Shree Radha Damodhar Studios, the film features Sandeep Saroj, Trinadh Varma, P. Sai Kumar, Goparaju Ramana, Raadhya and Yaswanth Pendyala in important roles alongside other ensemble cast.

At the 72nd National Film Awards 2024, the film won the Best Telugu Feature Film, and Best Make-up.

== Plot ==
In a peaceful East Godavari village, the harmony of a close-knit friend group is disrupted when a disagreement leads to an unexpected fallout, impacting their lives and the tranquility of their community.

== Cast ==
- Sandeep Saroj as Shiva
- P. Sai Kumar as President Bujji
- Goparaju Ramana as Venkatrao, Shiva’s father
- Yaswanth Pendyala as Surya
- Eshwar Rachiraju as William
- Trinadh Varma as Subbu
- Prasad Behara as Peddhodu
- Manikanta Parasu as Chinnodu, Peddhodu’s brother
- Lokesh Kumar Parimi as Aathram
- Shyam Kalyan as Ravi
- Raghuvaran as Rambabu
- Shiva Kumar Matta as British
- Akshay Srinivas as Kishore
- Sharanya Suresh Raadhya as Madhuri, Surya’s love interest
- Tejaswi Rao as Jyothi, William’s love-interest
- Teena Sravya as Sridevi, Shiva’s wife
- Vishika as Padma, Peddhodu’s wife
- Shanmukhi Nagumanthri as Fathima, Shiva’s ex-love-interest
- Kishore Kumar Polimera as Satthaya, Aathram’s father
- Kota Jayaram as Surya’s father
- Jaya Naidu as Surya’s mother
- Hemanth Mulagala as Surya's brother
- Shashank Mannam as Subbu's brother
- Sri Lakshmi as Idly Mama, Ravi’s grandmother
- Niharika Konidela in a cameo appearance

== Production ==
The film was extensively shot in Amalapuram and other parts of Andhra Pradesh. Filming was completed by late-April 2024.

== Music ==
The film's soundtrack album and background score were composed by Anudeep Dev.

Committee Kurrollu

Soundtrack album by Anudeep Dev
- Released: 2024
- Genres: Drama, Romance
- Language: Telugu
- Label: T-Series
- Producer: Anudeep Dev

Anudeep Dev chronology
| Hanu-Man (2024) | Committee Kurrollu (2024) |

All music is composed by Anudeep Dev.

Track list
| No. | Title | Lyrics | Singer(s) | Length |
|---|---|---|---|---|
| 1. | "Gorrela Song" | Nag Arjun Reddy | Anudeep Dev, Vinayak, Akhil Chandra, Harshavardhan Chavali, Aditya Bheemathati, Sindhuja Srinivasan, Maneesha Pandranki, Arjun Vijay | 3:45 |
| 2. | "Aa Rojulu Malli Raavu" | Krishna Kanth | Karthik | 4:15 |
| 3. | "Prema Gaaradi" | Kittu Vissapragada | Armaan Malik | 3:47 |
| 4. | "Sandhadi Sandhadi" | Simhachalam Mannela | Anudeep Dev, Renu Kumar, Srinivas Darimisetty | 3:13 |
| 5. | "Oo Baatasari" | Ramajogayya Sastry | P V N S Rohit | 4:40 |
| 6. | "Committee Kurrollu Promotional Song" | Raghuram | Anudeep Dev, Akhil Chandra, Harshavardhan Chavali, Ritesh G Rao | 3:36 |
| 7. | "Huyire Huyire" | Simhachalam Mannela | Krishna Chaitanya, Pranav Chaganti | 3:33 |
| 8. | "Prathi Kshanam" | Krishna Chaitanya | Deepu | 3:43 |
| 9. | "That’S What They Call Us" | Aditya Karamchedu | Aditya Karamchedu | 1:49 |
| 10. | "Nenemi Sethura Devara" | Simhachalam Mannela | Sahithi | 3:15 |

== Release ==
Committee Kurrollu was released on 9 August 2024. Post-theatrical digital streaming rights were acquired by ETV Win and was premiered on 12 September 2024.

== Reception ==
Pratyusha Sista of Telangana Today opined that the film resonates deeply with the millennials. Overall, she gave a positive review, with particular praise to screenplay, music, storytelling and strong performances from the actors. Similarly Deccan Chronicle too appreciated Yadu Vamsi's work, with further praise to Anudeep Dev's score, Edurolu Raju's cinematography work and performances of all the actors involved.

Citing it as "a nostalgia ride", Times Now gave a rating of 3 out of 5, and praised director Yadu Vamsi's work. The critic further stated that "the film is a visual treat with good performances, and a message about the complexities of life in a village setting".

== Awards ==
- Best Telugu Feature Film and Best Make-up at the 72nd National Film Awards 2024.
