= Haiku (film) =

- Theatrical release poster
- Directed by: Yuvaraj Chinnasamy
- Written by: Yuvaraj Chinnasamy; Hariharan Ram S
- Produced by: D. Arulanandhu; Mathewo Arulanandhu
- Starring: Aegan; Sridevi Apalla; Femina George
- Cinematography: Priyesh Gurusamy
- Edited by: Sakthi Praneesh Prakash
- Music by: Siddhu Kumar
- Production company: Vision Cinema House
- Distributed by: Sakthi Film Factory
- Release date: 23 October 2026
- Running time: 143 minutes
- Country: India
- Language: Tamil

Haiku is a 2026 Indian Tamil-language romantic drama film directed by Yuvaraj Chinnasamy and produced by Vision Cinema House. The film stars Aegan, Sridevi Apalla and Femina George (in their Tamil debut). Shot between February and June 2026, it was released on 23 October the same year, and did not perform well at the box office.

== Plot ==
Manoharan "Mano" gets expelled from his engineering college and joins a newly co-ed women's college in Coimbatore as its only male student. There, he falls deeply in love with his bold, traditional classmate Pavalakodi "Kodi", experiencing the highs of young romance. However, as insecurities, unemployment, and long-distance struggles take over, Mano's excessive possessiveness drives Kodi away and ends their relationship. Years later, a more mature Mano moves to Chennai and works as a software design team lead. At his office, he grows close to a new trainee named Nivetha "Nivi", who is healing from her own toxic past relationship. While Mano helps Nivi trust in healthy love again, a shared journey where he opens up about his failed college romance triggers new doubts that test whether their relationship can survive.

== Cast ==
- Aegan as Manohar "Mano"
- Sridevi Apalla as Pavalakodi "Kodi"
- Femina George as Nivetha "Nivi"
- Adirchi Arun
- Subramanian Sethu
- Adhiyaman
- Mime Gopi
- Indhumathy Manikandan
- Sumathi G. as Dhanya

== Production ==
In mid-November 2025, it was announced that actor Aegan would be collaborating with director Yuvaraj Chinnasamy and actresses Sridevi Apalla and Femina George for an untitled film. The title of the film was unveiled as Haiku the following December. It is the Tamil debut for both actresses. Principal photography began on 1 February 2026 in Idukki, and the first filming schedule was completed by 22 February. Parts of the first schedule were also shot in Coimbatore. The second schedule took place in Chennai. As part of this schedule, a song sequence was shot over two days and two nights on a set erected to resemble a bachelor's residence. The second schedule was completed by late March. Filming wrapped in late June, and post-production began shortly thereafter.

== Soundtrack ==
The music was composed by Siddhu Kumar, replacing the originally announced Vijai Bulganin.

Track listing
No.	Title	Lyrics	Singer(s)	Length
1.	"Karuvizhi"	Mohan Rajan	Armaan Malik	3:28
2.	"Yeppa Yesappa"	Vignesh Ramakrishna	Anthony Daasan	2:45
3.	"Thithikiriye"	Vignesh Ramakrishna	Adithya RK, Sanjana Kalmanje	2:46
4.	"Jigala Jillelo"	Vignesh Ramakrishna	Shibi Srinivasan	3:56
5.	"Pizhaiyaaga"	Vignesh Ramakrishna	Abrahaam Nithya Pandian, Padmaja Sreenivasan	2:56
6.	"Sillaga Sillaga"	Vignesh Ramakrishna	A. K. Prriyan	1:47
7.	"Dhure Dhure"	Vignesh Ramakrishna	Ramya C	2:33
Total length:				20:11

== Release ==
Haiku was released in theatres on 23 October 2026, by Sakthi Film Factory. Netflix had secured the film's post-theatrical streaming rights even before the completion of filming. It began streaming there from 20 November 2026.

== Reception ==
=== Critical response ===
Akshay Kumar of The New Indian Express wrote, "Romantic dramas often revolve around second chances, and Haiku is no exception. What makes it special is its suggestion that such chances need not be confined to romantic relationships, they can also be extended to oneself". Abhinav Subramanian of The Times of India wrote, "Haiku has a sound idea about love and self-respect, but keeps it hidden behind a hero who is hard to root for", and appreciated the music and cinematography.

Salma Sulthana of Mathrubhumi gave a negative review and despite praising the cast performances and technical aspects, wrote, "The film has a worthwhile point, but it never finds a fresh way to make it. The writing is content to follow the template, so even the good ideas feel like things you have heard before". News Today wrote, "Haiku is a feel-good romantic entertainer that celebrates second chances. With appealing performances, pleasant music and a positive message, the film reminds viewers that losing love can sometimes help a person understand what love truly means".

=== Box office ===
Journalists noted that Haiku underperformed at the box office, mainly due to the successful run of Jailer 2 which meant that small-budget Tamil films released in the same timeframe went largely unnoticed.
