= Sapthagiri LLB =

- Directed by: Charan Lakkakula
- Screenplay by: Paruchuri Brothers
- Story by: Subhash Kapoor
- Based on: Jolly LLB by Subhash Kapoor
- Produced by: Dr. K. Ravi Kirane
- Starring: Saptagiri; Kaashish Vohra; Sai Kumar
- Cinematography: Sarangam SR
- Edited by: Gautham Raju
- Music by: Vijai Bulganin
- Production company: Sai Celluloid Cinematic Creations
- Release date: 7 December 2017
- Country: India
- Language: Telugu

Sapthagiri LLB is a 2017 Indian Telugu-language film directed by Charan Lakkakula. The film is a remake of Jolly LLB, a Hindi film. The story is about a small-time lawyer who challenges a top lawyer in a hit-and-run court case. It stars Saptagiri, Kaashish Vohra and Sai Kumar.

== Plot ==
Sapthagiri is a Chittoor based lawyer staying with his brother-in-law in Hyderabad for experience after losing a case in Chittore and is in a relationship with Chitti. He happens to see prominent criminal lawyer Tejender Rajpal successfully defending Rohit Dewan, a boy from a high-society family in a sessions court, who is accused of drunken driving in a Toyota Fortuner killing six people sleeping on the footpath.

Sapthagiri, desperate to have some money and fame, decides to pursue the case and files a PIL in the court against Rohit Dewan. After initially reprimanding Sapthagiri for his mistakes in filing the PIL and taking the press reports as an evidence, The judge, Naramalli Sivaprasad warns Sapthagiri to collect some evidence before the next hearing. Sapthagiri then runs into Albert Pinto, who claims to have witnessed the accident but soon learns that he is a lackey of Rajpal and was a plan to extract more money from the Dewan family. As part of the deal, Pinto gives Sapthagiri a share of the money and turns hostile in the court. Chitti and the canteen owner Rahim Chacha chide him for compromising on justice for his greed. He returns the money to Rajpal and challenges him to win the case.

With his brother in-law's help, Sapthagiri collects the video footage of the car involved in the accident and presents it to the court. Rajpal counters that the car was driven by the driver of Dewan family and the footage was fake. Sapthagiri refutes it by successfully cross examining the driver, who finally accepts that he has registered a false statement. The Judge orders the police to provide the bodyguard, Baby for Sapthagiri after he is manhandled by Rajpal's assistants. Although Sub-Inspector Patnaik (Ravi Kale) tries to sabotage Sapthagiri. Sapthagiri, with the help of the bodyguard, leaves for Tamsi after he learns that Hanuman Das, a survivor of the accident stays there.

Sapthagiri, after passing through many hurdles, successfully brings Rao to the court. Rajpal tries to scuttle proceedings but the hesitant judge overrules him. Das states that the SI had threatened him after the accident and fabricated the investigation. He was only allowed to go after he offered his hard-earned money and jewelry. Rao also identifies Rahul Dewan as the one who drove the car. After the emotional closing arguments by Rajpal and Sapthagiri, the judge directs the police department to suspend the SI and initiate a criminal inquiry against him and also declares Rohit Dewan as guilty of the crime and sentences lifetime jail under Section 302 and 303A of the Indian Penal Code. As Sapthagiri walks out receiving praises, Rajpal sits crestfallen over losing a case for the first time.

== Cast ==
- Saptagiri as Sapthagiri LLB
- Kaashish Vohra as Chitti
- Sai Kumar as Tejendar Rajpal
- Siva Prasad as Judge Naramalli Sivaprasad
- Sai Kiran as Albert Pinto
- Dr. K. Ravi Kirane as Sapthagiri's brother-in-law
- Gollapudi Maruthi Rao as Rahim Chacha
- Raja Krishnamoorthy as Yogi Dewan (Rohit's father)
- Raghu Babu as Guruji
- Kota Srinivasa Rao as Senior Dewan (Rohit's grandfather)
- Jhansi as Judge Jhansi
- Ravi Kale as SI Patnaik
- Thotapalli Madhu as Chitti's father
- Duvvasi Mohan as Constable for Dandupalyam Batch
- Jabardasth Appa Rao as Prosecutor
- Paruchuri Venkateswara Rao as Lawyer
- Chandra Mohan as Police Constable
- Jaya Prakash Reddy as Dr. Naidu
- Shakalaka Shankar as Lawyer Shakalaka Shankar
- Shaking Sheshu as Man at the Auction #1
- Chatrapathi Sekhar as Hanuman Das
- L. B. Sriram as a farmer
- Prabhas Sreenu as Prabhas Sreenu (cameo)
- Dhanraj as Prabhas Sreenu's friend (cameo)
- Swetha Saini as Tejendar Rajpal's Lady Assistant

== Soundtrack ==
The music was composed by Vijai Bulganin and released by Junglee Music.

Sapthagiri LLB

Soundtrack album by Vijai Bulganin
- Released: 22 November 2017
- Recorded: 2017
- Genre: Soundtrack
- Length: 15:50
- Label: Junglee Music
- Producer: Vijai Bulganin

Vijai Bulganin chronology
Saptagiri Express (2016)	Sapthagiri LLB (2017)	Vajra Kavachadhara Govinda (2019)

Track list
No.	Title	Lyrics	Singer(s)	Length
1.	"Chithurukke Chandrudu"	Kandikonda, Suresh Banisetti	Shankar Mahadevan	3:34
2.	"Aa Cheithi Gaajula"	Suresh Banisetti	Vijai Bulganin, Lokeshwar, Mangli	3:44
3.	"Emaindi Emaindi"	Ramajogayya Sastry	Vijai Bulganin, Kailash Kher	4:48
4.	"Are Are Ek Dham"	Lakshmi Priyana	Vijai Bulganin, Divya Kumar, M. M. Manasi	3:44
Total length:				15:50

== Reception ==
The film received mostly unfavorable reviews. Suresh Kavirayani of the Deccan Chronicle called it a "bad remake, but still watchable," with "loud and irritating" songs.
