= Vajra Kavachadhara Govinda =

Indian comedy drama film

- Theatrical release poster
- Directed by: Arun Pawar
- Written by: Arun Pawar; GTR Mahendra
- Produced by: Edala Narendra; GVN Reddy
- Starring: Saptagiri; Vaibhavi Joshi
- Cinematography: Praveen Vanamali
- Music by: Vijai Bulganin
- Production company: Siva Sivam Films
- Release date: 14 June 2019
- Country: India
- Language: Telugu

Vajra Kavachadhara Govinda is a 2019 Indian Telugu comedy drama film directed by Arun Pawar and starring Saptagiri and Vaibhavi Joshi.

== Cast ==
- Saptagiri as Govind
- Vaibhavi Joshi as Tripura Sundari
- Viren Thambidorai as Naryana
- John Kottoly as DD Baba
- Veda as an MLA
- Srinivasa Reddy
- Temper Vamsi
- Venu Yeldandi
- Jabardasth Avinash
- Appa Rao
- Jasper
- Prashanth Siddi as Doctor

== Production ==
The film is directed by Arun Pawar, who previously directed Best Actors (2015) and Saptagiri Express (2016). Saptagiri plays a desperate thief named Govindu. The film includes portions shot in Belum Caves.

== Soundtrack ==
Vajra Kavachadhara Govinda

Film score by Vijai Bulganin
- Released: 2019
- Genre: Soundtrack
- Length: 14:39
- Label: Aditya Music

Vijai Bulganin chronology
Sapthagiri LLB (2017)	Vajra Kavachadhara Govinda (2019)	Meet Cute (2022)

Music composed by Vijai Bulganin. Music acquired by Aditya Music.

No.	Title	Lyrics	Singer(s)	Length
1.	"Jindagi"	Ramajogayya Sastry	Kaala Bhairava	3:41
2.	"Keechu Rayi"	Ramajogayya Sastry	Vijay Bulganin	4:78
3.	"Murari Murari"	Ramajogayya Sastry	Spoorthi Jithender	4:10
4.	"Chinnoda"	Suresh Banisetti	Lokeshwar	1:90
5.	"Chorus"		S. P. Balasubrahmanyam, Manu, S. P. B. Charan, Kousalya, Nishma	4:32
Total length:				14:39

== Reception ==
Neeshita Nyayapati of The Times of India gave the film a rating of 1.5/5 and said that "An overblown drama is all you get in lieu of an exciting treasure hunt". Murali Krishna CH of The New Indian Express wrote that "To say the least, VKG is a bland, boring and unintentionally amusing saga that plods on for over 140-minutes". 123 Telugu wrote that "On the whole, Vajra Kavachadara Govinda is commercial drama which does not have anything going its way. The plot is weak and the treatment is even more disappointing. Except for Sapatgiri’s sincere performance and some comedy, this film falls flat in many aspects".
