= Slum Dog Husband =

2023 Indian romantic comedy film

- Theatrical release poster
- Directed by: A. R. Sreedhar
- Written by: A. R. Sreedhar
- Produced by: Appi Reddy; Venkat Annapareddy
- Starring: Sanjay Rrao; Pranavi Manukonda
- Cinematography: Srinivas J. Reddy
- Edited by: A. Vaishnav Vasu
- Music by: Bheems Ceciroleo
- Production company: Mic Movies
- Release date: 29 July 2023
- Country: India
- Language: Telugu

Slum Dog Husband is a 2023 Indian Telugu-language romantic comedy film written and directed by A. R. Sreedhar. The film stars Sanjay Rrao and Pranavi Manukonda alongside Brahmaji, Saptagiri, Raghu Karumanchi, and Yadamma Raju in supporting roles.

== Cast ==
- Sanjay Rrao as Parsigutta Laxman aka Lacchi
- Pranavi Manukonda as Mounika
- Muralidhar Goud as Mounika's father
- Brahmaji as Lawyer Salman Khan
- Saptagiri as David Mathew
- Duvvasi Mohan
- Raghu Karumanchi
- Yadamma Raju as Parsigutta Santosh
- Fish Venkat
- RK Mama as Inspector Balaram
- Ali
- Chammak Chandra
- Sunil (Cameo appearance)

== Production ==
=== Development ===
The concept for the film, which features a dog as a key element, was inspired by Puri Jagannadh's affection for dogs, as observed by A. R. Sreedhar, who had previously assisted Jagannadh for seven years. Additionally, Sreedhar drew inspiration from the story of Aishwarya Rai's marriage, where she had reportedly married a tree as part of a pre-wedding ritual to appease astrological beliefs. This anecdote, combined with Jagannadh's love for dogs, sparked Sreedhar's interest and led him to write a story that incorporated both ideas. The film was launched on 10 April 2022, coinciding with Sri Rama Navami, and was announced under the tentative title Production No. 4, marking the fourth venture for the banner Mic Movies.

=== Casting ===
During the filming of Mr. Pregnant, producer Appi Reddy shared the story of the film with Brahmaji and offered him a role as a divorce lawyer. Following this, Reddy asked Brahmaji to have his son Sanjay Rrao play the lead role. Later, Brahmaji shared the story with Sanjay, and he was subsequently cast in the film. Pranavi Manukonda, known for her roles as a child actress in films like Routine Love Story and Uyyala Jampala, makes her debut as a lead actress with this film. A trained dog from Commando Kennels in Medchal was utilized for the film. However, despite its training, the dog would often wander around the set, making it challenging for the trainer to direct its attention towards the camera. To manage this, the crew allowed the dog regular breaks to relax and avoid overexertion.

== Soundtrack ==
Slum Dog Husband

Soundtrack album by Bheems Ceciroleo
- Released: 2 August 2023
- Genre: Feature film soundtrack
- Length: 17:26
- Language: Telugu
- Label: Saregama

Bheems Ceciroleo chronology
Unstoppable (2023)	Slum Dog Husband (2023)	Mad (2023)
External audio
- Slum Dog Husband – Jukebox on YouTube

The film has songs composed by Bheems Ceciroleo.

Track listing
No.	Title	Lyrics	Singer(s)	Length
1.	"Lacchi Gaani Pelli"	Kasarla Shyam	Bheems Ceciroleo	4:43
2.	"You're My Dp"	Suresh Gangula	Sai Madhav, Swathi Reddy UK	3:06
3.	"Untenem Pothenem"	Srinivas Teja	Ramu Rathod	2:51
4.	"Mera Chota Dil"	Kasarla Shyam	Sri Krishna, Kumara Vagdevi	3:21
5.	"Frustration Song"	Purna Chary	Rahul Sipligunj, Bheems Ceciroleo	3:25
Total length:				17:26

== Release ==
Slum Dog Husband was originally scheduled to be released on 21 July 2023, but it was postponed and was released theatrically on 29 July 2023.

=== Home media ===
The digital streaming rights were acquired by Amazon Prime Video and the film began streaming on the platform from 24 August 2023.

== Reception ==
Anji Shetty of Sakshi rated the film two-and-a-half out of five stars, stating that it would have been more effective if the director had focused more on comedy scenes rather than romantic scenes. Aithagoni Raju of Asianet News Telugu gave the film two-and-a-half out of five stars, opining that it would have benefited from a more nuanced approach to storytelling, and noting that while it may not resonate with family audiences, it would likely appeal to teenagers due to its frivolous and illogical scenes.

Srivathsan Nadadhur of OTTplay gave it one out of five stars and wrote, "Slum Dog Husband is a juvenile sex-comedy masquerading as a farce. The director AR Sreedhar fails to build upon an unconventional premise and tries to cover much ground in the third act with a twist. The writing is largely substandard and the performances don’t make an impression at all." A critic from Eenadu found the film's background story and songs to be good, while the way the story unfolded and the courtroom scenes were weaknesses. The critic also noted that the comedy scenes were silly and concluded that the film is disappointing.

Prakash Pecheti of The South First gave it zero-and-a-half out of five stars and wrote, "Slum Dog Husband could have been possibly inspired by WhatsApp ideas or silly social media jokes— grossly illogical and absurd. Neither the comedy nor the sad plight of the protagonist would make you invest in the story."
