= Temper (soundtrack) =

Film score by Anup Rubens
- Released: 16 September 2014
- Recorded: 2014
- Genre: Soundtrack
- Length: 21:12
- Label: Aditya Music
- Producer: Anup Rubens

Anup Rubens chronology
Gopala Gopala (2015)	Temper (2014)	Courier Boy Kalyan (2015)

Temper is the feature film soundtrack composed by Anup Rubens for the 2015 Telugu film of the same name. It consists of six songs all composed by Rubens and Telugu lyrics penned by Bhaskarabhatla, Kandikonda and Viswa. The Telugu soundtrack was marketed by Aditya Music and was released on 16 September 2014 to positive reviews from critics.

== Development ==
Devi Sri Prasad was selected as the music director of the film in late June 2014. But Rama Rao Jr. insisted Puri Jagannadh to have a different composer. Anup Rubens replaced Devi Sri Prasad in late September 2014 while Mani Sharma was selected to compose the film's background score. Rubens was alleged to use a tune rejected by Jagannadh for the song Bhaje Bhaaje in the film Gopala Gopala which he denied in an interview later. Rahul Kumar, mostly known as Roll Rida, rapped for the songs. The track list was allegedly leaked online five days ahead of its official release by its makers. It featured six songs but the list did not feature names of lyricists and singers. The official track list unveiled featured five songs and a Theme music. Bhaskarabhatla penned lyrics for three songs while Viswa and Kandikonda penned the lyrics for one each.

== Release ==
In late November 2014, the film's soundtrack was reported to be launched on 14 December 2014 at Nimmakuru in Krishna district of Andhra Pradesh. Later, the venue was reported as Guntur. Bandla Ganesh later clarified that they are planning to launch the film's soundtrack at Hyderabad in the second week of December 2014. Few sources claimed that the makers are planning to release the soundtrack directly into the market in the third week of December 2014. The audio launch was postponed to 18 January 2015 due to the death of Nandamuri Janakiram.

The makers dropped the idea and planned to release the soundtrack on 26 January 2015 after completing the film's shoot. Aditya Music acquired the audio rights in mid January 2015 for an amount of ₹50 million. A day later, Bandla Ganesh postponed the audio release to 31 January 2015. Hours later, he rescheduled the date to 28 January 2015 on the request of Rama Rao Jr.'s fans. Shreyas Media announced that they would organise the audio launch which marks their four hundredth event. Shilpakala Vedika was confirmed as the venue of audio launch. Bandla Ganesh unveiled the first CD in a temple on 26 January 2015 on the eve of Ratha Saptami. Three songs including the title song apart from Ittage Rechchipodam and Devudaa were released in YouTube by Aditya Music before the audio launch.

== Track listings ==
Telugu track list
No.	Title	Lyrics	Artist(s)	Length
1.	"Choolenge Aasma"	Viswa	Adnan Sami, Ramya Behara, Veena Ghantasala, Anup Rubens	04:11
2.	"Temper"	Bhaskarabhatla Ravi Kumar, Rahul (rap)	Uma Neha, M. L. R. Karthikeyan, Bhargavi Pillai, Simha, Rap Rahul	04:06
3.	"Devudaa"	Bhaskarabhatla Ravi Kumar	Anup Rubens, Puri Jagannadh	03:28
4.	"One More Time"	Kandikonda	Lipsika, Ranjith	04:26
5.	"Ittage Rechchipodam"	Bhaskarabhatla Ravi Kumar	Geetha Madhuri, Dhanunjay, Anudeep Dev, Arun	03:17
6.	"Theme Music"	Rahul (rap)	Hymath, Arun, Anudeep Dev, Dhanunjay, Rap Rahul	01:44
Total length:				21:12

== Reception ==
Professional ratings
Review scores
Source	Rating
Oneindia Entertainment	3/5 stars
IndiaGlitz	3/5 stars
Behindwoods	2.5/5 stars

The songs were released online by Aditya Music on 28 January 2015 and the soundtrack received positive response from audience and fans. The songs went viral on social networking within minutes of the audio launch. The soundtrack received positive reviews from critics who however felt that the melodious numbers are more impressive than the fast numbers and the popularity of the songs will depend completely on visualisation. Reviewing the soundtrack, IndiaGlitz gave 3 out of 5 stars and called it a cross between Anoop Rubens and Puri Jagannadh, adding that it deserves praise for its thematic variety. 123Telugu called the soundtrack a mixed bag which has some thing for everyone and chose "Choolenge Aasma" as the best song of the soundtrack. Oneindia Entertainment gave 3 out of 5 stars. Behindwoods gave 2.5 out of 5 stating that the soundtrack fails to deliver the fun impact that is expected from a Rama Rao Jr.'s film and selected "Choolenge Aasma" and "One More Time" as the best songs. Karthik S. of Milliblog called the soundtrack an "Aptly mass’y and enjoyable commercial" one.
