= Adithya RK =

Indian playback singer(born 1998)

- Born: Adithya Radhakrishnan; 2 May 1998 (age 28)
- Origin: India
- Genres: Film score; independent music
- Occupations: Playback singer, Music Composer
- Instrument: Vocals
- Years active: 2021–present

Adithya RK is an Indian playback singer and music composer, who predominantly works in Tamil and Telugu cinema. He gained recognition for his performances in films including Don and Das Ka Dhamki. Adithya has contributed to Tamil, Telugu, Kannada, Malayalam, and Hindi tracks.

== Personal life ==
Adithya was born and brought up in Chennai, Tamil Nadu, to Krishnan and Meera Krishnan, an Indian actress known for her work in Tamil-language films and television serials. She is also a veena player.

His father Krishnan runs the recording studio Shruthilaya in Chennai.

He completed his graduation at Loyola College, Chennai

== Career ==
Super Singer Season 8 fame Adithya RK made his playback debut with the song "Bae" from the film Don (2022), composed by Anirudh Ravichander. He rose to popularity with the song "Chalona" in the Telugu version of Jawan (2023), and continued his career with multiple singles and film songs in both Tamil and Telugu.

His vocals have been featured in romantic melodies, upbeat dance numbers and emotional tracks. He frequently collaborates with composers like Anirudh Ravichander and Leon James.

== Discography ==
=== Film and television songs ===
List of film and television songs sung by Adithya RK
Year	Song	Film	Language	Composer	Notes and Ref.
2021	"Bandhame"	Doctor (D)	Telugu	Anirudh Ravichander	
2022	"Friendship Song"	Lucky Man	Kannada	V2 Vijay Vicky	
2022	"Dhoora Dhoora"	Lucky Man	Kannada	V2 Vijay Vicky	
2022	"Kanna Kanna"	Vattam	Tamil	Nivas K. Prasanna	
2022	"Thaathi Kadhali"	Oru Kalainganin Diary	Tamil	Shane Xtreme	Singaporean TV series
2022	"Bae"	Don	Tamil	Anirudh Ravichander	
2022	"Bae"	Don	Telugu	Anirudh Ravichander	Dubbed version
2023	"Chalona"	Jawan (D)	Telugu	Anirudh Ravichander	
2023	"Almost Padipoyindhe Pilla"	Das Ka Dhamki	Telugu	Leon James	
2023	"Nalo Nena Natho Nena"	MenToo	Telugu	Elisha Praveen	
2023	"Kuru Kuru"	Kannai Nambathey	Tamil	Siddhu Kumar	
2023	"Engu Pogirom"	Kannai Nambathey	Tamil	Siddhu Kumar	
2023	"Sakkaraiya"	Oh Butterfly	Tamil	Satthia Nallaiah	
2023	"Love Panna Podhume"	Locker	Tamil	Vykunth Srinivasan	
2023	"Pala Mukhangal"	Animal (D)	Tamil	Vishal Mishra	
2024	"Naa Favourite Naa Pellam"	Janaka Aithe Ganaka	Telugu	Vijai Bulganin	
2024	"Hey Azhaghiye"	Rekkai Mulaithen	Tamil	Theeson	
2024	"Udaiyathe"	Laandhar	Tamil	M.S.Praveen	
2024	"Hey Nainika"	Teenz	Tamil	D. Imman	
2024	"Vittukoduthu Poda"	2K Love Story	Tamil	D. Imman	
2024	"Shooting Star"	Star	Tamil	Yuvan Shankar Raja	
2024	"Ennadi Kannamma"	Baa Baa Black Sheep	Tamil	Santhosh Dhayanidhi	
2024	"Valikudhey"	Sharada - Rori Edition 1	Tamil	V2 Vijay Vicky	
2025	"Kaadhal Sadugudu"	Madraskaaran	Tamil	Sam C. S.	
2025	"Lavender Neramae"	Kadhalikka Neramillai	Tamil	A. R. Rahman	
2025	"It's A Break Up Da"	Kadhalikka Neramillai	Tamil	A. R. Rahman	
2025	"Jinguchaa"	Thug Life	Tamil	A. R. Rahman	
2025	"O Maara"	Thug Life	Telugu	A. R. Rahman	
2025	"Kannamma"	Beauty	Telugu	Vijai Bulganin	
2025	"Icchukundam Baby"	Laila	Telugu	Leon James	
2025	"Minnali"	House Mates	Tamil	Rajesh Murugesan	
2025	"Santhosha Saaral Mazhai"	Mr Zoo Keeper	Tamil	Yuvan Shankar Raja	
2025	"Oruthi"	Sweetheart!	Tamil	Yuvan Shankar Raja	
2025	"Jillelama"	Kiss	Tamil	Jen Martin	
2025	"Hey Penne"	Haal	Malayalam	Nandhagopan V	
2025	"Kaise Karu"	Madharaasi (D)	Hindi	Anirudh Ravichander	
2025	"Ullake Odippoyi"	Madharaasi (D)	Malayalam	Anirudh Ravichander	
2025	"Thara Thara"	Madharaasi (D)	Kannada	Anirudh Ravichander	
2025	"Varadhalle"	Madharaasi (D)	Telugu	Anirudh Ravichander	
2025	"Pedavula Thadi"	Virgin Boys	Telugu	Smaran Sai	
2025	"Theerum Kadhal"	Aaromaley	Tamil	Siddhu Kumar	
2025	"Oh Kadhale"	Tere Ishk Mein (D)	Tamil	A. R. Rahman	
2025	"Thaaraga Thugalaa"	The Black Bible	Tamil	Aswin Krishna	
2026	"Marandhu Poche"	With Love	Tamil	Sean Roldan	
2026	"Modalainthile"	Dhurandhar (D)	Telugu	Shashwat Sachdev	
2026	"Vo Nahin"	Main Vaapas Aaunga	Hindi	A. R. Rahman	
2026	"Minnal Adikudhadi"	Double Occupancy	Tamil	Sam C. S.	
2026	"Uyire Uyire "	Double Occupancy	Tamil	Sam C. S.	
2026	"Habibi"	Pyaar Prema Kalyanam	Tamil	Yuvan Shankar Raja	
2026	"Hangova"	DC (film)	Telugu	Anirudh Ravichander	Co-sung with Anirudh Ravichander
2026	"Hangova"	DC (film)	Hindi	Anirudh Ravichander	Co-sung with Anirudh Ravichander

=== Independent music videos and singles ===
List of non-film songs/music videos featuring Adithya RK
Year	Title	Language	Composer	Ref
2021	"Poonja Kannazhagi"	Tamil	Biju Sam	
2022	"Amour"	Tamil	Pranav Aditya & Sanjay Prashadh K R	
2022	"Sengandhal Penne"	Tamil	Vedshanker Sugavanam	
2022	"Dhandasoru"	Tamil	Himself	
2022	"Inneram Indha Neram"	Tamil	Vijai Bulganin	Dubbed version of "Yemaiundacho"
2022	"Madhubala"	Tamil	Vijai Bulganin	Dubbed version of "Madhubala"
2023	"Adiye Paduthadha"	Tamil	V2 Vijay Vicky	
2023	"Enjotti"	Tamil	Dharan Kumar	
2023	"Ole Ole"	Telugu	Vijai Bulganin	
2023	"Oye Oye"	Tamil	Vijai Bulganin	Dubbed version of "Ole Ole"
2023	"Hey Siri"	Tamil	Kiran Surath N	
2023	"Mazhai Thuligal"	Tamil	Kaushik Ganesan	
2024	"Unnai Saranadainthen"	Tamil	Deva	
2024	"Unnai Enni"	Tamil	Himself	
2024	"Dream Girl"	Tamil	Ilamaran	
2024	"Thedi Thedi Paathen"	Tamil	V Mathiyalagan	
2025	"I'm from Ulundurpettai"	Tamil	Sagishna Xavier	
2025	"Idhu Kaadhal Dhaane"	Tamil	Himself	
2025	"First Sight"	Tamil	Beatzup Tamizha	
2025	"Hey Dolly"	Tamil	JEY	
2025	"Allah"	Tamil	Pavan	
2025	"Nee Irundhal"	Tamil		
2025	"Soul"	Tamil	Ku. Karthik	
2025	"Nizhal"	Tamil	Nandhagopan V	
2025	"Pim Pom"	Tamil; Telugu	L.V. Muthu Ganesh	
2026	"Oru Aayiram Varudangal"	Tamil	Himself	
2026	"Nee Parichayame"	Telugu	Himself	Dubbed version of "Oru Aayiram Varudangal"
2026	"Akela Dil"	Hindi	Himself	Dubbed version of "Oru Aayiram Varudangal"

== Television ==
Year	Title	Role	Notes
2021	Super Singer 8	Contestant	Eliminated
2026	Liplock		
