= Gopala Gopala =

Gopala Gopala may refer to any of the following in Indian cinema:

- Gopala Gopala (1996 film), a 1996 Tamil comedy film featuring Pandiarajan and Kushboo in lead roles
- Gopala Gopala (2015 film), a 2015 Telugu satirical drama film featuring Pawan Kalyan and Daggubati Venkatesh in lead roles
  - Gopala Gopala (soundtrack), its soundtrack album by Anoop Rubens
- "Gopala Gopala", a song by A. R. Rahman, S. P. Balasubrahmanyam and S. Janaki from the 1994 Indian film Humse Hai Muqabala
