= Court: State vs a Nobody =

Court: State vs A Nobody
- Theatrical release poster
- Directed by: Ram Jagadeesh
- Written by: Ram Jagadeesh
- Screenplay by: Ram Jagadeesh; Karthikeya Sreenivass; Vamsidhar Sirigiri
- Produced by: Prashanti Tipirneni
- Starring: Priyadarshi Pulikonda; P. Sai Kumar; Sivaji; Rohini; Harsha Vardhan; Subhalekha Sudhakar; Harsh Roshan; Sridevi Apalla
- Cinematography: Dinesh Purushothaman
- Edited by: Karthika Srinivas
- Music by: Vijai Bulganin
- Production company: Wall Poster Cinema
- Release date: 14 March 2025
- Running time: 149 minutes
- Country: India
- Language: Telugu
- Budget: ₹4–5 crore
- Box office: est. ₹57–58.15 crore (Note: Deccan Chronicle has reported ₹57 crore gross, whereas News18 reported ₹58.15 crore gross)

Court: State vs A Nobody is a 2025 Indian Telugu-language legal drama film written and directed by Ram Jagadeesh in his directorial debut; it was produced by Prashanti Tipirneni and presented by Nani, through Wall Poster Cinema. The film stars Priyadarshi Pulikonda, P. Sai Kumar, Sivaji, Rohini, Harsha Vardhan, Subhalekha Sudhakar, Harsh Roshan and Sridevi Apalla in important roles.

The film was released on 14 March 2025 to positive reviews from critics and was successful at the box office grossing ₹57–58.15 crore worldwide. The film is being remade in Tamil as Ranjan – The Advocate.

== Plot ==
Surya Teja is a junior lawyer at a Law firm owned by Mohan Rao. He aspires to one day be given and win an individual case so that he can be more than what his father was able to do, which was notarise documents.

Chandrashekar is a 19-year-old boy who does numerous errands to support himself. His family constitutes his father, who works as a watchman in a plot of land, his mother and sister. Chandrashekar is contacted by a 17-year-old girl, Jabilli who comes from a well to do family and is friend of his neighbour. Soon the teenagers fall in love.

Mangapathi, married to Jabilli's paternal aunt, is considered as the head of the family, as Jabilli's father has died. Mangapathi uses his lawyer Damodhar and bribes the police office to create false cases against people he believes have done something to tarnish his, and by extension his family, image or honour.

When Mangapathi finds out Jabili is discretely spending time with Chandrashekar, he gets Chandrashekar arrested and charged with the POCSO act, a law designed to quickly and effectively convict rapists and pedophiles of minor victims.

How Surya Teja happens to stumble upon this case and if justice is served to Chandrashekar forms the crux of the story.

== Cast ==
- Priyadarshi Pulikonda as Adv. Surya Teja
- P. Sai Kumar as Advocate G. Mohan Rao, Surya Teja's Senior
- Sivaji as Mangapathi, Jabilli's uncle
- Rohini as Meruvalli Seetha Ratnam, Jabilli's mother
- Harsha Vardhan as Advocate K. S. Damodhar "Damu", Mangapathi's personal friend and lawyer
- Subhalekha Sudhakar as Meruvalli Ramachandrayya, Jabilli's paternal grandfather
- Harsh Roshan as Mettu Chandrasekhar "Chandu"
- Sridevi Apalla as Meruvalli Jabilli
- Vadlamani Srinivas as Lawyer Sivaram
- Surabhi Prabhavathi as Mettu Nagalakshmi, Chandu's mother
- Rajasekhar Aningi as Chandu's father
- Vishika as Lahari
- Raghuram as Reddy
- Srinivas Bhogireddy as Judge
- Kamal as Doctor Prabhakar
- Jwala Koti as CI K. Ramesh Reddy
- Ramu as SI S. Ravi Kumar
- Sai Raj as Bech Clerk
- Srivani Tripuraneni as Surya Teja's mother
- Surya Teja as Jabilli's paternal uncle
- Vani Shalini as Jabilli's aunt
- Godavari Gopi as Koti
- Vidyasagar Karampuri as Ramu Naidu
- Srihari as Jabilli's father (posthumous photographic appearance)

== Production ==
Ram Jagadeesh approached Priyadarshi Pulikonda with a romance story, which Priyadarshi was not interested in. Then Ram Jagadeesh told Priyadarshi about a friend of his who was wrongly accused of a crime. Priyadarshi asked Ram to research similar cases. Subsequently, Ram read case files related to the POCSO Act. He drew inspiration from the case files he read and developed a fictional story. The screenplay was written by Ram Jagadeesh with Karthikeya Sreenivass and Vamsidhar Sirigiri. The film was produced by Prashanti Tipirneni, while Deepthi Ganta co-produced it. In August 2024, Nani announced that he would present the film Court: State vs a Nobody, unveiling a title motion poster. Principal photography began in September 2024.

== Soundtrack ==
Court – State vs a Nobody

Soundtrack album by Vijai Bulganin
- Released: 14 February 2025
- Genre: Feature film soundtrack
- Length: 8:54
- Language: Telugu
- Label: Saregama

Vijai Bulganin chronology
Janaka Aithe Ganaka (2024)	Court – State vs a Nobody (2025)

Singles from Court – State vs a Nobody
- 1. "Premalo" Released: 14 February 2025; 2. "Chitti Guvva" Released: 26 March 2025

The film has a soundtrack composed by Vijai Bulganin. The soundtrack comprises two songs. The first song was released on 14 February 2025.

Track listing
No.	Title	Lyrics	Singer(s)	Length
1.	"Premalo"	Purna Chary	Anurag Kulkarni, Sameera Bharadwaj	5:30
2.	"Chitti Guvva"	Purnachary	Kala Bhairava	3:24
Total length:				8:54

== Release ==
=== Theatrical ===
Court – State vs a Nobody was released theatrically on 14 March 2025. The film received positive reviews from the critics.

=== Home media ===
The digital streaming rights were acquired by Netflix. It was released on 11 April 2025.

== Reception ==
=== Critical reception ===
Paul Nicodemus of The Times of India rated the film three-and-a-half out of five stars and wrote, "Debutant director Ram Jagadeesh punches well above his weight, delivering a film that is both deeply moving and socially relevant. Court: State vs A Nobody is not just a courtroom drama—it is a slice-of-life portrayal of human emotions, societal biases, and the pursuit of justice." Avad Mohammad of OTTplay gave the film 3.5/5 stars and wrote, "a gripping courtroom drama with outstanding performances, a strong message, and powerful emotions. Though the film starts slow, once it reaches the conflict point, there is hardly a dull moment." A critic from The Hans India gave the film 3.5/5 stars and wrote, "Court: State Vs A Nobody is an engaging legal drama with standout performances from Priyadarshi, Shivaji, and Harsh Roshan. Though the first half is slow, the courtroom sequences in the latter half make it worth a watch." Avinash Ramachandran of The Indian Express gave the 3.5/5 stars and wrote, "Strong performances and emotional beats do the heavy lifting in this familiar legal drama."

Satya Pulagam of ABP Desam rated the film three out of five stars. Jalapathy Gudelli of Telugucinema.com gave the film 3.5/5 stars and wrote, "a fairly engaging courtroom drama that sparks reflection on societal and judicial issues. Despite a sluggish first half and some narrative conveniences, strong performances—particularly from Priyadarshi and Shivaji—and a well-executed second half make it a worthwhile watch." Sanjay Ponnappa of India Today gave it 2.5/5 stars and wrote, "Presented by Telugu star Nani, this courtroom drama steadily captures the audience's attention before entering the court to make an emotional case, but falls short when it comes to making the case compelling and smart." Sashidhar Adivi of Times Now gave it 2.5/5 stars and wrote, "Overall, Court–State vs. A Nobody is a decent courtroom drama in Telugu cinema and will appeal to its target audience. The emotional depth, narrative style, and social message make it a one-time watch despite shortcomings."

B. H. Harsh of Cinema Express wrote, "Debutant filmmaker Ram Jagadeesh shows a lot of promise in his debut, handling a familiar concept with impressive control and freshness". Sangeetha Devi Dundoo of The Hindu wrote, "Court is not groundbreaking. But it is an absorbing drama where the most applause-worthy moments stem from thoughtful writing and sharp dialogues." Balakrishna Ganeshan of The News Minute wrote, "Although director Ram Jagadeesh’s Court: State Vs A Nobody aspires to be a gripping legal drama, it leans heavily onto melodrama rather than procedural precision, ultimately weakening its impact." Swaroop Kodur of The Hollywood Reporter India wrote, "Some of the elements in Ram Jagadeesh’s debut film feel slightly off-base, but the film comes together because of strong performances and staging."

=== Box office ===
Court – State vs a Nobody made on a budget of ₹4 crore grossed ₹8 crore on the opening day and ₹23 crore worldwide in the opening weekend. It concluded its theatrical run with worldwide gross estimated to be ₹57–58.15 crore.
