= Pelli Kani Prasad =

2025 Indian Telugu-language film by Abhilash Reddy Gopidi

- Theatrical release poster
- Directed by: Abhilash Reddy Gopidi
- Screenplay by: Abhilash Reddy Gopidi; Akhil Varma; Y. N. Lohit
- Story by: Akhil Varma; Y. N. Lohit
- Produced by: K. Y. Babu; Bhabu Prakash Goud; Sukka Venkateshwar Goud; Vaibhav Reddy Mutyala
- Starring: Saptagiri; Priyanka Sharma; Mahaboob Basha
- Cinematography: Sujatha Siddharth
- Edited by: Madhu
- Music by: Sekar Chandra
- Production company: Thama Media
- Distributed by: Sri Venkateswara Creations
- Release date: 21 March 2025
- Running time: 118 minutes
- Country: India
- Language: Telugu

Pelli Kani Prasad (transl. Unmarried Prasad) is a 2025 Indian Telugu-language comedy drama film co-written and directed by Abhilash Reddy Gopidi. The film features Saptagiri and Priyanka Sharma in lead roles.

The film was released on 21 March 2025.

== Cast ==
- Saptagiri as Katnam Prasad
- Priyanka Sharma as Priya
- Muralidhar Goud as Prasad’s father
- Prabhavati Varma as Prasad’s mother
- Vadlamani Srinivas as Priya’s father
- Pramodini Pammi as Priya’s mother
- Annapurna as Priya’s grandmother
- Mahaboob Basha as Priya’s household helper
- Laxman Meesala as Bossu, Prasad’s friend
- Kittayya as Prasad’s uncle
- Rohini Reddy as Prosecutor
- Jabardasth Ramprasad as Defence Lawyer
- Rakesh Rachakonda as Marriage Broker
- Shaking Seshu as Police Officer

== Release and reception ==
Pelli Kani Prasad was released on 21 March 2025.

Aditya Devulapally of Cinema Express gave a rating of 2.5 out of 5 and wrote that "Pelli Kani Prasad does attempt some level of social satire. It doesn’t just mock Prasad’s father’s dowry obsession; it also pokes fun at Priya’s family’s desperation for a foreign visa". Giving the same rating, OTTPlay stated "Pelli Kani Prasad is a film packed with humor—though loud and rushed at times. The storyline is decent, but its lack of emotional depth weakens the impact".
