= Hanu-Man (soundtrack) =

- Soundtrack album cover

Soundtrack album by GowraHari, Anudeep Dev and Krishna Saurabh
- Released: 2024
- Recorded: 2022–2023
- Studios: Quirky Vox Studios, Hyderabad; Rhythm Online, Hyderabad; 20db Studios, Chennai; Sri Abheri Studios, Hyderabad; Jubilee 10 Studios, Hyderabad; Atrium Studios, Chennai
- Genre: Feature film soundtrack
- Length: 27:56
- Language: Telugu
- Label: Tips Industries
- Producers: GowraHari; Anudeep Dev

Singles from HanuMan
- 1. "Hanuman Chalisa" Released: 6 April 2023; 2. "SuperHero HanuMan" Released: 14 November 2023; 3. "Avakaya Anjaneya" Released: 28 November 2023; 4. "Sri Ramadootha Stotram" Released: 3 January 2024

Hanu-Man is the soundtrack album, composed by GowraHari, Anudeep Dev and Krishna Saurabh to the 2024 Indian Telugu-language superhero film of the same name. The film is directed by Prasanth Varma, starring Teja Sajja in the title role, alongside Amritha Aiyer, Varalaxmi Sarathkumar, Raj Deepak Shetty and Vinay Rai.

The soundtrack featured eight main tracks with lyrics written by Krishna Kanth, Simhachalam Mannela, Hanumath Ramadootha Strotam, Siva Shakthi Datta, Kasarla Shyam and Tripuraneni Kalyanachakravarthy.

== Background ==
While GowraHari was hired to compose most of the songs, Anudeep Dev and Krishna Saurabh were hired to compose few songs. It marked their maiden collaboration with Prasanth Varma and Teja Sajja.

Later Krishna Kanth, Simhachalam Mannela, Hanumath Ramadootha Strotam, Siva Shakthi Datta, Kasarla Shyam and Tripuraneni Kalyanachakravarthy were signed to write the lyrics. Madhurakavi and Mohan Rajan penned the lyrics in Tamil; Kumaar, Riya Mukherjee and Subrat Sinha in Hindi. Arun Alat wrote all the lyrics in Malayalam; K.Kalyan and Aniruddha Sastry wrote the lyrics for the Kannada version of the film. The music rights were bagged by Tips Industries for all the languages.

"Hanuman Chalisa" is a devotional number, "Superhero Hanuman" is a hilarious song; and the third single, "Avakaya Anjaneya", is a folk number. The album consists of songs of different genres.

== Composition ==
The first single was Tulsidas's "Hanuman Chalisa". It was recorded by Sai Charan in all languages. The second single "SuperHero Hanuman", composed by Anudeep Dev was recorded by Sai Veda Vagdevi in all languages. It was also sung by Prakruthi Reddy and Mayukh in Telugu, R.P. Krishaang and Ahana Balaji in Tamil, Prakruthi Reddy in Hindi and Kannada, Vaishnavy Panicker, and Ritu Raj in Malayalam. The lyrics had references to superheroes Superman, Batman, He-Man, X-Men, Captain America, Black Panther, Aquaman, Iron Man, Thor, Hulk, Spider-Man, Wolverine, Doctor Strange, Wonder Woman, The Flash, Ant-Man, as well as villains like Thanos, Loki, and Joker.

The track "Avakaya Anjaneya", which was also composed by Anudeep Dev, was recorded by Sahithi Galidevara in Telugu, Tamil, and Kannada. It was sung by Sunidhi Chauhan and Sithara Krishnakumar in Hindi and Malayalam, respectively. The song "Sri Ramadootha Stotram" was recorded by Sai Charan, Lokeshwar Edara, and Harshvardhan Chavali. It was a Sanskrit song penned by Hanumath Ramadootha Strotam. "Anjanadri Theme Song" was written by Siva Shakthi Datta and sung by Sai Charan in all languages, except Shankar Mahadevan in Hindi. The Meenakshi Intro Song, "Poolamme Pilla", penned by Kasarla Shyam, was sung by GowraHari himself in Telugu. It was recorded by Yogi Sekar in Tamil, Malayalam and Kannada and Javed Ali in Hindi. "Raghukula Dalapathi" was a BGM scored by GowraHari. "Raghunandana" song was sung by Saicharan Bhaskaruni, Lokeshwar Edara, and Harashavardhan Chavali, while Tripuraneni Kalyana Chakravarthy penned the devotional lyrics in all languages. "Ye Kannu Kuttindho Yamunike" song was composed by Krishna Saurabh and sung by Kaala Bhairava in Telugu and Kannada, Anand Aravindakshan in Tamil and Malayalam and Kailash Kher in Hindi. Alap vocals was given by Yadu Krishnan in all languages.

== Marketing and release ==
On 30 March 2023, coinciding with Sri Rama Navami, makers announced that the first single would be released on 6 April 2023. The first single, titled "Hanuman Chalisa", was released on 6 April 2023, coinciding with Hanuman Jayanti. The lyrical version of the single was made as a conceptual animation featuring Lord Hanuman and Rama. On the same day, Teja Sajja visited Radio City and Radio Mirchi and launched the song.

On Deepavali, the makers announced the second single was scheduled to release on 14 November 2023. The second single, titled "Superhero Hanuman", was released on 14 November 2023, coinciding with Children's Day. An interview featuring composer and lyricist was released on 27 November 2023. The third single, titled "Avakaya Anjaneya" (in Telugu and Hindi), "Aalankaayaa Anjaneya" (in Tamil), "Maangayachaar Anjaneya" (in Malayalam), and "Vajrakaaya Anjaneya" (in Kannada), was released on 28 November 2023. The song launch event was held in Hyderabad on the same day. Later, a promotional video featuring Gangavva and Teja Sajja was released on YouTube to promote the song.

On 3 January 2024, a Sanskrit song titled "Sri Ramadootha Stotram" was released. It is also the first Sanskrit song released by a Pan-Indian film. On 26 January 2024, "Anjanadri Theme Song" was released, coinciding with Republic Day. The song highlights the fictional place of Anjanadri in the film and the story behind the rise of superheroe. The Meenakshi Intro Song, "Poolamme Pilla" (in Telugu), "Pookkaari Pulla" (in Tamil), "Phoolon Mein Hai Mila" (in Hindi), "Pookkari Penne" (in Malayalam), and "Hoovamma Hoove" (in Kannada) were released on 29 January 2024.

The next track "Raghukula Dalapathi" was released on 31 January. On 18 February, director Prasanth Varma announced the track "Raghunandana" is releasing soon. "Raghunandana" song was released on 20 February 2024. The next song "Ye Kannu Kuttindho Yamunike" (in Telugu), "Kadavul Padaippu Puriyala" (in Tamil), "Laage Bura Jaise Sapna Koi" (in Hindi), "Kaalathin Kai Theti Ezhuthiyo" (in Malayalam) and "Yaav Kannu Chucchitho Yamanige" (in Kannada) was released on 27 February 2024.

== Track listing ==
=== Telugu ===
No.	Title	Lyrics	Music	Singer(s)	Length
1.	"Hanuman Chalisa"	Tulsidas	GowraHari	Sai Charan	4:08
2.	"SuperHero HanuMan"	Krishna Kanth	Anudeep Dev	Sai Veda Vagdevi, Prakruthi Reddy, Mayukh	3:48
3.	"Avakaya Anjaneya"	Simhachalam Mannela	Anudeep Dev	Sahithi Galidevara	4:19
4.	"Anjanadri Theme Song"	Siva Shakthi Datta	GowraHari	Sai Charan	1:58
5.	"Poolamme Pilla"	Kasarla Shyam	GowraHari	GowraHari	3:57
6.	"Raghunandana"	Tripuraneni Kalyanachakravarthy	GowraHari	Saicharan Bhaskaruni, Lokeshwar Edara, Harshavardhan Chavali	2:37
7.	"Ye Kannu Kuttindho Yamunike"	Krishna Kanth	Krishna Saurabh Surampalli	Kaala Bhairava, Yadu Krishnan	4:29
Total length:					27:56

Extended Soundtrack
No.	Title	Lyrics	Music	Singer(s)	Length
8.	"Hanuman Title Track (Anthati Praanaanthaka Gaayamtho)"	Siva Sakthi Datta	GowraHari	Saicharan Bhaskaruni, Lokeshwar Edara, Chaithu Satsangi, Harshavardhan Chavali	2:26
9.	"Hanuman Powers Theme (Samayamaagamam)"	Instrumental	GowraHari	–	3:16
10.	"Raghukula Dalapathi"	Kalyan Chakravarti	GowraHari	Saicharan Bhaskaruni, Chaithu Satsangi, Harshavardhan Chavali	0:50
11.	"Vibheeshana Inspiring (Sathayojana)"	Kalyan Chakravarti	GowraHari	Saicharan Bhaskaruni	1:55
12.	"Sri Ramadootha Stotram"	Traditional	GowraHari	Sai Charan, Lokeshwar Edara, Harshvardhan Chavali	2:59
13.	"Ram Ram Ram Theme"	Traditional	GowraHari	Sai Charan, Chorus	0:55

=== Tamil ===
No.	Title	Lyrics	Music	Singer(s)	Length
1.	"Hanuman Chalisa"	Tulsidas	GowraHari	Sai Charan	4:08
2.	"SuperHero HanuMan"	Madhurakavi	Anudeep Dev	Sai Veda Vagdevi, R.P. Krishaang, Ahana Balaji	3:48
3.	"Aalankaayaa Anjaneya"	Mohan Rajan	Anudeep Dev	Sahithi Galidevara	4:19
4.	"Anjanadri Theme Song"	Siva Shakthi Datta	GowraHari	Sai Charan	1:58
5.	"Pookkaari Pulla"	Mohan Rajan	GowraHari	Yogi Sekar	3:57
6.	"Raghunandana"	Tripuraneni Kalyanachakravarthy	GowraHari	Saicharan Bhaskaruni, Lokeshwar Edara, Harshavardhan Chavali	2:37
7.	"Kadavul Padaippu Puriyala"	Madhurakavi	Krishna Saurabh Surampalli	Anand Aravindakshan, Yadu Krishnan	4:29
Total length:					24:36

=== Hindi ===
No.	Title	Lyrics	Music	Singer(s)	Length
1.	"Hanuman Chalisa"	Tulsidas	GowraHari	Sai Charan	4:08
2.	"SuperHero HanuMan"	Kumaar	Anudeep Dev	Sai Veda Vagdevi, Prakruthi Reddy	3:48
3.	"Avakaya Anjaneya"	Riya Mukherjee	Anudeep Dev	Sunidhi Chauhan	4:19
4.	"Anjanadri Theme Song"	Siva Shakthi Datta	GowraHari	Shankar Mahadevan	1:58
5.	"Phoolon Mein Hai Mila"	Riya Mukherjee	GowraHari	Javed Ali	3:57
6.	"Raghunandana"	Tripuraneni Kalyanachakravarthy	GowraHari	Saicharan Bhaskaruni, Lokeshwar Edara, Harshavardhan Chavali	2:37
7.	"Laage Bura Jaise Sapna Koi"	Subrat Sinha	Krishna Saurabh Surampalli	Kailash Kher, Yadu Krishnan	4:29
Total length:					24:36

=== Malayalam ===
No.	Title	Lyrics	Music	Singer(s)	Length
1.	"Hanuman Chalisa"	Tulsidas	GowraHari	Sai Charan	4:08
2.	"SuperHero HanuMan"	Arun Alat	Anudeep Dev	Sai Veda Vagdevi, Vaishnavy Panicker, Ritu Raj	3:48
3.	"Maangayachaar Anjaneya"	Arun Alat	Anudeep Dev	Sithara Krishnakumar	4:19
4.	"Anjanadri Theme Song"	Siva Shakthi Datta	GowraHari	Sai Charan	1:58
5.	"Pookkari Penne"	Arun Alat	GowraHari	Yogi Sekar	3:57
6.	"Raghunandana"	Tripuraneni Kalyanachakravarthy	GowraHari	Saicharan Bhaskaruni, Lokeshwar Edara, Harshavardhan Chavali	2:37
7.	"Kaalathin Kai Theti Ezhuthiyo"	Arun Alat	Krishna Saurabh Surampalli	Anand Aravindakshan, Yadu Krishnan	4:29
Total length:					24:36

=== Kannada ===
No.	Title	Lyrics	Music	Singer(s)	Length
1.	"Hanuman Chalisa"	Tulsidas	GowraHari	Sai Charan	4:08
2.	"SuperHero HanuMan"	K. Kalyan	Anudeep Dev	Sai Veda Vagdevi, Prakruthi Reddy	3:48
3.	"Vajrakaaya Anjaneya"	Aniruddha Sastry	Anudeep Dev	Sahithi Galidevara	4:19
4.	"Anjanadri Theme Song"	Siva Shakthi Datta	GowraHari	Sai Charan	1:58
5.	"Hoovamma Hoove"	Aniruddha Sastry	GowraHari	Yogi Sekar	3:57
6.	"Raghunandana"	Tripuraneni Kalyanachakravarthy	GowraHari	Saicharan Bhaskaruni, Lokeshwar Edara, Harshavardhan Chavali	2:37
7.	"Yaav Kannu Chucchitho Yamanige"	K. Kalyan	Krishna Saurabh Surampalli	Kaala Bhairava, Yadu Krishnan	4:29
Total length:					24:36

== Reception ==
Reviewing the soundtrack, Paul Nicodemus of The Times of India wrote "The music by Anudeep Dev, Gowra Hari, and Krishna Saurabh adds to the overall experience." Sana Farzeen of India Today wrote "The music is quite pleasant". Ram Venkat Srikar of Film Companion wrote "GowraHari's music instills so much energy into the film".

Reviewing the track "SuperHero Hanuman" Times Now wrote "the song is extremely fun and light hearted, and while the vocals and instrumentation are really good, the lyrics may just be the best part." Commenting on the track "Avakaya Anjaneya" Sanjiv Kumar of Hindustan Times wrote "Anudeep Dev has composed this groovy folk song with mashy beats."

Reviewing the film score, Sangeetha Devi Dundoo of The Hindu wrote "Gowra Hari's score is in sync with the emotional beats of the narrative."
