= Sarangadhariya =

2024 Indian film by Padmarao Abbisetti

- Theatrical release poster
- Directed by: Padmarao Abbisetti
- Written by: Padmarao Abbisetti
- Screenplay by: Padmarao Abbisetti, Vinay Ram Kotti (dialogues)
- Produced by: Umadevi Challapalli; Sarat Chandra Challapalli
- Starring: Raja Ravindra; Mohi Shm; Mohit Pedada; Yashaswini Srinivas; Neela Priya Devulapalli; Shivakumar Ramachandravarapu
- Cinematography: Sidharth Swayamboo
- Edited by: Rakesh Reddy
- Music by: M. Ebenezer Paul
- Production company: Saija Creations
- Release date: 12 July 2024
- Running time: 150 minutes
- Country: India
- Language: Telugu

Sarangadhariya is a 2024 Indian Telugu-language drama film written and directed by Padmarao Abbisetti (Pandu). The film has an ensemble cast of Raja Ravindra, Mohi Shm, Mohit Pedada, Yashaswini Srinivas, Neela Priya Devulapalli and Shivakumar Ramachandravarapu. Sarangadhariya was released on 12 July 2024.

== Plot ==
Krishnakumar (Raja Ravindra) works as a lecturer in a private engineering college and leads a secluded life with his wife Lakshmi (Neela Priya Devulapalli), sons Arjun (Moin Mohammad) and Sai (Mohit Pedada), and daughter Anupama (Yashaswini Srinivas). He is already struggling with huge debts and the errant behavior of his sons, Arjun and Sai, who are caught in tumultuous romantic relationships. Their lives take a drastic turn when a startling truth about his daughter Anupama is revealed. How this revelation impacts their lives and connects to Raju (Shivakumar Ramachandravarapu), millionaire Batley (Srikanth Iyengar), Fathima (Madhu Latha), and College Head Murthy (Harsha Vardhan) forms the crux of the story.

== Cast ==
- Raja Ravindra as Krishna Kumar, father of Arjun, Sai and Anupama
- Mohi Shm as Arjun
- Mohit Pedada as Sai
- Yashaswini Srinivas as Anupama
- Shivakumar Ramachandravarapu as Raj
- Neela Priya Devulapalli as Lakshmi
- LV Prasad CH
- Madhu Latha as Fathima
- Srikanth Iyengar as Manager
- Harsha Vardhan as Murthy
- Kadambari Kiran
- Gemini Suresh

== Music ==
Sarangadhariya

Soundtrack album by M. Ebenezer Paul
- Released: 2024
- Recorded: 2024
- Language: Telugu
- Label: Aditya Music
- Producer: M. Ebenezer Paul

The film's soundtrack album and background score were composed by M. Ebenezer Paul.

All music is composed by M. Ebenezer Paul.

Track list
No.	Title	Lyrics	Singer(s)	Length
1.	"Andukova"	Rambabu Gosala	K. S. Chithra
2.	"Ee Jeevithamante"	Rambabu Gosala	Dinker Kalvala
3.	"Naa Kannule"	Kadali	P V N S Rohit
4.	"Entha Andhamo"	Kadali	Dhanunjay Seepana
5.	"Kannaa Nenunnaa"	Danty Jayakumar	Aishwarya, Laxmi Meghana

== Release and reception ==
Sarangadhariya was released on 12 July 2024.

BH Harsh of The New Indian Express gave a rating of 2.5 out of 5 saying "Sarangadhariya has an interesting, albeit somewhat dully-paced, slice-of-life quality". Praising Raja Ravindra's performance, Sashidhar Adivi of Times Now stated that "Sarangadhariya is an average family drama that can give you reasons to root for it". The Times of India too gave the same rating and wrote "Sarangadhariya is a film with its heart in the right place, shedding light on several social issues that warrant discussion".
