= Sridevi Apalla =

Indian actress

- Born: Kakinada, Andhra Pradesh, India
- Occupations: Actress, social media influencer
- Years active: 2025–present

Sridevi Apalla is an Indian actress who primarily works in Telugu cinema. She made her acting debut in the critically acclaimed romantic courtroom drama Court: State vs a Nobody (2025).

== Early life and career ==
Sridevi Apalla was born and raised in Kakinada, Andhra Pradesh. She initially gained public recognition as a social media influencer by creating short videos and reels on Instagram. She was discovered online by filmmaker Ram Jagadeesh, which led to her breakthrough in the film industry. In 2025, Apalla made her feature film debut in Court: State vs a Nobody, presented by Nani. She portrayed "Jabili", an emotionally intense 17-year-old girl, a performance that received widespread praise from film critics and audiences alike. Following her debut success, she signed on to play the lead role in the romantic musical Band Melam, produced under the Kona Film Corporation banner. She made her Tamil cinema debut in Haiku the same year. Additionally, she is set to star in an upcoming Tamil film alongside Arjun Ashokan, directed by Regan Stanislaus.

== Filmography ==
Year	Film	Role	Language	Notes
2025	Court: State vs a Nobody	Meruvalli Jabili	Telugu	
2026	Band Melam	Raajamma Raji	Telugu	
2026	Haiku	Pavalakodi "Kodi"	Tamil	
