= Pranaya Godari =

2024 Indian Telugu-language film by PL Vignesh

- Theatrical release poster
- Directed by: PL Vignesh
- Written by: PL Vignesh
- Produced by: Lingaiah Paramall
- Starring: Sadan Hasan; Priyanka Prasad
- Cinematography: Prasad Edara
- Edited by: Kodaganti Veekshitha Venu
- Music by: Markandeya Paramalla
- Production company: PLV Creations
- Release date: 13 December 2024
- Country: India
- Language: Telugu

Pranaya Godari is a 2024 Indian Telugu-language action drama film written and directed by PL Vignesh. The film features Sadan Hasan and Priyanka Prasad in lead roles.

The film was released on 13 December 2024.

== Cast ==
- Sadan Hasan as Srinu
- Priyanka Prasad as Goyya Lakshmi Prasanna
- P. Sai Kumar as Pedda Kapu
- Prudhvi Raj
- Jabardasth Rajamouli
- Ushasri as Lalitha
- Sunil Ravinuthala as Gochi
- Prabhavathi
- Mirchi Madhavi

== Music ==
The background score and soundtrack is composed by Markandeya Paramalla.

All lyrics are written by Markandeya Paramalla; all music is composed by Markandeya Paramalla.

Track list
No.	Title	Singer(s)	Length
1.	"Kalalo Kalalo"	Sri Krishna	3:47
2.	"Gu Guggu"	Bhargavi Pillai	3:56
3.	"Choodakayyo Nemalikalla"	Sai Charan, Sunitha	3:34
4.	"Thellaru Poddullo"	Dhanunjay Seepana, Adithi Bavaraj	3:27
5.	"Oho Pranayagodari"	Satya Yamini	4:08

== Release ==
Pranaya Godari was released on 13 December 2024.

== Reception ==
Asianet News Telugu and News18 Telugu also gave the same rating.
