= Beauty (2025 film) =

2025 Indian film

- Theatrical release poster
- Directed by: J S S Vardhan
- Written by: RV Subramanyamm
- Produced by: Adidhala Vijaypal Reddy; Umesh Kumar Bansal
- Starring: Ankith Koyya; Nilakhi Patra; Naresh
- Cinematography: Shrie Saikumaar Daara
- Edited by: S. B. Uddhav
- Music by: Vijai Bulganin
- Production companies: Vanara Celluloid; Zee Studios; A Maruthi Team Product
- Release date: 19 September 2025
- Running time: 139 minutes
- Country: India
- Language: Telugu

Beauty is a 2025 Indian Telugu-language romantic drama film directed by J S S Vardhan. It stars Ankith Koyya, Nilakhi Patra and Naresh in important roles.

The film was released on 19 September 2025.

== Plot ==
The film depicts the romance between Alekhya (Nilakhi), a college student, and Arjun (Ankith), a pet trainer. Alekhya's sudden disappearance prompts her family to search for her, leaving her father, Narayan (Naresh), emotionally shaken. The narrative examines the evolving search and its emphasis on faith, relationships, and paternal affection.

== Cast ==
- Ankith Koyya as Arjun
- Nilakhi Patra as Alekhya
- Naresh as Narayana, Alekhya's father
- Vasuki Anand as Janaki, Alekhya's mother
- Prasad Behara
- Nithin Prasanna as CI Imran
- Murali Goud
- Nanda Gopal
- Nagendra Medida

== Music ==
The background score and soundtrack were composed by Vijai Bulganin.

Track listing
No.	Title	Lyrics	Singer(s)	Length
1.	"Kannamma"	Sanare	Adithya RK, Lakshmi Meghana	5:34
2.	"Pretty Pretty"	Purna Chari	P V N S Rohit	4:39
3.	"Nuvu Leni Nenu"	Dev	Ritesh G Rao	3:30
4.	"Nenevare Nenevare"	Sanare	Dhanunjay Seepana	3:19

== Release ==
=== Theatrical release ===
Beauty was released on 19 September 2025.

=== Home media ===
The digital streaming rights of Beauty were acquired by ZEE5. Following its theatrical run, the film premiered on the platform on 2 January 2026.

== Reception ==
Sangeetha Devi Dundoo of The Hindu opined that the casting strengthened the film and praised the performances of Ankith Koyya and Nilakhi Patra. Echoing the same, Shreya Varanasi of The Times of India rated it 3 out of 5 and stated, "Beauty is a watchable drama that balances youthful romance with parental love". BH Harsh of Cinema Express rated it 2 out of 5 and was critical towards story and screenplay while appreciating Ankith Koyya's performance.
