= Oka Brundavanam =

Indian Telugu-language film by Sathya Botcha

- Theatrical release poster
- Directed by: Sathya Botcha
- Written by: Chetan Bandi
- Produced by: Kishore Tatikonda; Venkat Regatte; Bommineni Venkata Prahalad (BVP); Manoj Indupuru
- Starring: Balu; Shinnova; Sanvitha
- Cinematography: Raj K Nalli
- Edited by: Tammiraju; Santhosh Kammireddy
- Music by: Sunny–Saketh
- Production company: Seer Studios
- Release date: 23 May 2025
- Country: India
- Language: Telugu

Oka Brundavanam is a 2025 Indian Telugu-language drama film directed by Sathya Botcha. The film features Balu, Shinnova and Sanvitha in important roles. The film was released on 23 May 2025.

== Plot ==
Oka Brundavanam follows the journey of Raja Vikram, a financially struggling cameraman, and Mahi, a spirited young woman aiming to document her late mother's story. Their paths cross with Nainika, a young girl searching for her long-lost parents. As they collaborate on a documentary, they uncover a Christmas mystery and embark on a journey of self-discovery, emotional healing, and redefined relationships.

== Cast ==
- Balu as Raja Vikram
- Shinnova as Maha
- Baby Sanvitha as Nainika
- Subhalekha Sudhakar as Joseph Rathnam
- Vamsi Nekkanti as Maha’s father
- Rupa Lakshmi as Maha’s mother
- Annapurna as Maha’s grandmother
- Sivaji Raja as Damodar, Vikram’s father
- Kalyanee Raju as Nagamani, Vikram’s mother
- Mahendar as Vikram’s friend
- Ananth Babu as Vikram’s manager
- Baby Rithvika as Pinky, Nainika’s friend
- Jaya Naidu as Orphanage Nun
- Mehaboob Basha as Watchman

== Music ==
The music for Oka Brundavanam is composed by the duo Sunny–Saketh. The soundtrack includes songs like "Kagithala Navalevi," sung by Karthik with lyrics by Kalyan Chakravarthy, and "Pasi Pasi," released in April 2025.

All music is composed by Sunny–Saketh.

No.	Title	Lyrics	Singer(s)	Length
1.	"Pasi Pasi Thanamey"	Chandrabose	Chinmayi Sripada	3:20
2.	"Inthinthai Saagene"	Kalyan Chakravarthy	Rahul Sipligunj	3:00
3.	"Ne Ikapai"	Ramajogayya Sastry	Karthik	3:01
4.	"Kagithala NavaleIvi"	Kalyan Chakravarthy	Karthik	4:19
5.	"Eeshwara"	Srinu Pandrank	Dasari Aishwarya	2:27
6.	"Hey Kadhile Kannulu"	Kasarla Shyam	N. C. Karunya	3:49
7.	"Ye Dhaarini Adigi"	Kalyan Chakravarthy	N. C. Karunya	3:42
8.	"Inni Naalluga"	Padmaja Sreenivasan	Kalyan Chakravarthy	1:20
9.	"Pasi Pranam"	Srinivasa Mouli	Dhanunjay Seepana	4:24
10.	"Pada Pada"	Srinivasa Mouli, Srinu Pandrank	Abhijit Rao	1:42
11.	"O Chitti Chilakamma"	Heera Shetty	Kalyan Chakravarthy	2:55

== Release ==
=== Theatrical ===
Oka Brundavanam was released theatrically on 23 May 2025. The film received a U certificate and is noted for its heartfelt storytelling and emotional depth.

=== Home media ===
The film began streaming on ETV Win from 20 June 2025.

== Reception ==
The Times of India praised the film as "a heart-touching family drama that speaks volumes with its silence," highlighting its emotional storytelling and performances. The review commended the film's subtle direction and the mature performances of the cast, especially the main leads. The film was noted for its realistic treatment of social issues and its emotional impact. B. H. Harsh of Cinema Express rated the film 3/5 stars and wrote, "Oka Brundavanam is at its strongest when it tries to capture emotions casually and gently. It falls apart only when it resorts to a formula." A critic from Sakshi gave the film 2.5/5 stars.
