= Mr. King =

- Directed by: Sasiidhar Chavali
- Written by: Sasiidhar Chavali
- Produced by: BN Rao
- Starring: Sharan Kumar; Yasvika Nishkala; Urvi Singh
- Cinematography: Tanvir Anzum
- Edited by: Sasiidhar Chavali
- Music by: Mani Sharma
- Production company: Hanvika Creations
- Release date: 24 February 2023
- Running time: 145 minutes
- Country: India
- Language: Telugu

Mr. King is a 2023 Indian Telugu-language romantic thriller film directed by Sasiidhar Chavali and starring Sharan Kumar, Yashvika Nishkala and Urvi Singh. The music was composed by Mani Sharma. The film released on 24 February 2023.

== Cast ==
- Sharan Kumar as Shiva
- Yasvika Nishkala as Uma Devi
- Urvi Singh as Vennela
- Murali Sharma as Seetha Rama Raju
- Tanikella Bharani as a professor
- Vennela Kishore as Uma Devi’s fiance
- Sunil
- SS Kanchi
- Mirchi Kiran
- Roshan Reddy as Krishna
- Ashima Narwal
- Shweta
- Anjali
- Srinivas Goud
- Phani
- Raj Kumar
- Srinidhi Guduru

== Soundtrack ==
The music was composed by Mani Sharma and released by Saregama Telugu.

Track listing
No.	Title	Lyrics	Singer(s)	Length
1.	"Chinni Choodu Chinni"	Bhaskarabhatla	Rahul Sipligunj	3:03
2.	"Neneragani Daaredho"	Kadali	Harika Narayan	4:43
3.	"Raa Raa Naa Mama"	Kadali	Mohana Bhogaraju, Dhanunjay Seepana	4:34
4.	"Yeti Seyyane Mangathayaru"	Ramajogayya Sastry	Ram Miriyala	4:58
5.	"Nuvvante Nakentho Ishtam"	Bhaskarabhatla	Ayaan, Manjusri Mutyam	3:59
Total length:				21:17

== Reception ==
A critic from The Times of India wrote that "Mr King has several moments to commend, but it still has scope for refinement. It could have been better executed – especially the episodes involving the love triangle between Shiva, Umadevi and Vennela". A critic from The Hans India wrote that "In summary, Mr. King fails to impress with its weak plot and lackluster execution, resulting in a tedious viewing experience". A critic from The South First wrote that "Mr King is a well-intentioned film by a new and young team. It tries to spread the message that a positive attitude and values matter more than money, to ensure success in the long run.". A critic from India Herald wrote that "the movie starts to seem excessively sanctimonious, and the endless talks get old quickly. Mr. king tries to offer advice on every topic pertaining to business, love, and marriage, which has greatly hurt the film".

== Home media ==
The movie was released on Amazon Prime Video.
