= Eesaraina =

Indian film

- Directed by: Viplav
- Written by: Viplav
- Produced by: Viplav, Sankeerth Konda
- Starring: Viplav; Ashwini Ayaluru; Mahaboob Basha; Karthikeya Dev; Prradeep Raparthi
- Cinematography: Giri
- Edited by: Viplav
- Music by: Tej
- Production company: Reading films production
- Release date: 8 November 2024
- Running time: 110 minutes
- Country: India
- Language: Telugu

Eesaraina is a 2024 Indian Telugu-language film directed by Viplav. produced by Viplav and Sankeerth Konda under the banner of Reading films production. Viplav and Ashwini Ayaluru are in lead roles. The film was theatrically released on 8 November 2024.

== Plot ==
The story follows Raju, a hopeful graduate facing his third and final attempt at securing a governmentjob after previous failures. Amidst the challenges of rural life and balancing the comforts of his family's farm, Raju finds support and comic relief in his loyal friend, Basha. Meanwhile, his journey takes a turn when he meets Shirisha, a dynamic schoolteacher who effortlessly secures a government job. As love blossoms between Raju and Shirisha, they navigate village gossip, comparisons, and a humorous rivalry with Shirisha's strong- willed father.

== Cast ==
- Viplav as Raju
- Ashwini Ayaluru as Shirisha
- Mahaboob Basha as Basha
- Prradeep Raparthi as Mama
- Karthikeya Dev as Raju

== Soundtrack ==
Eesaraina 2024

Soundtrack album by Tej
- Released: 2024
- Recorded: 2024
- Genre: Film soundtrack
- Language: Telugu
- Label: Madhura Audio

All music is composed by Tej.

Track List
| No. | Title | Lyrics | Singer(s) | Length |
|---|---|---|---|---|
| 1. | "Thaara Theerame" | Sharath Chepuri | P V N S Rohit |
| 2. | "Thokkudu Billa" | Goreti Venkanna | Goreti Venkanna |
| 3. | "Saagali Sudigali" | Rakendu Mouli | L. V. Revanth |
| 4. | "Ye Gaayamo" | Rakendu Mouli | Arjun Vijay |
| 5. | "Vinara Ori Sodhara" | Sharath Chepuri | Yashwant Nag |

== Reception ==
Deccan Chronicle wrote that EESARAINA is very relatable to the current youth and highlighted the music and natural dialogues. The Hans India commented that "EeSaaraina?!" is a sincere attempt by Viplav to bring forth a story that resonates with the struggles of today's youth. The review highlighted the film's music, performances, and relatable theme as its strengths while pointing out pacing issues in the first half. The second half, however, was praised for its engaging drama and well-timed comedy. The review also noted that the film's use of mostly fresh faces might limit its appeal to a broader audience. The review summarized the film as a heartfelt romantic drama with a mix of humor, emotion, and inspiration, commending Viplav's debut as both a director and actor. The Hans India gave the film a rating of 3/5.
