= Saptagiri (actor) =

Indian comedian

- Born: Venkata Prabhu Prasad; 1 May 1989 (age 37); Irala, Andhra Pradesh, India
- Occupations: Actor; comedian
- Years active: 2006–present

Venkata Prabhu Prasad (born 1 May 1989), professionally known as Saptagiri, is an Indian actor and comedian who works in Telugu films. He received Nandi Award as Best Male Comedian for his role in Express Raja (2016). He received Santosham Allu Ramalingaiah Smarakam Award at 15th Santosham Film Awards in 2017.

== Early life ==
Saptagiri was born and brought up in Irala village of Chittoor district in Andhra Pradesh. His father was a guard in forest department. Though his birthname was Venkata Prabhu Prasad, Saptagiri changed his name after an incident which happened in Tirumala.

== Career ==
Saptagiri moved to Hyderabad to pursue his career in acting, and struggled a lot before getting a break. He started film acting career with Bhaskar's film Bommarillu he used to work as an assistant director. Saptagiri got a chance to play a comedian role. He earned name as a Mini Brahmanandam in terms of remuneration and fame in low budget comedy films.

Saptagiri who started his career as an assistant director and turned as an actor. He acted as a comedian in many films. He made his debut as a lead role in Saptagiri Express (2016). In 2017, he played the lead in Sapthagiri LLB.

In June 2023, he expressed his wish to enter Andhra Pradesh politics, on behalf of Telugu Desam Party.

== Filmography ==
=== As actor ===
Key
†	Denotes films that have not yet been released

Year	Title	Role	Notes	Ref.
2006	Bommarillu	Hasini's gossiper		
2007	Desamuduru	Bala's colleague		
2008	Parugu	P. Yagna Narayana Sarma		
2009	Ganesh Just Ganesh	Appa Rao		
2009	Oy!	Abhishek's assistant		
2010	Sadhyam	Waiter		
2010	Happy Happy Ga	Malli		
2011	Kandireega	Nellore Giri		
2011	Mangala			
2012	Daruvu	Auto Driver		
2012	Mr. Nookayya	Raja's assistant		
2012	Gabbar Singh			
2012	Julayi	Ravi's friend		
2013	Jaffa	Saptagiri		
2013	Venkatadri Express	Dasthagiri		
2013	Ongole Gittha	Barber		
2013	Prema Katha Chitram	Giri		
2014	Kotha Janta	Giri		
2014	Pyar Mein Padipoyane	Husain Verma		
2014	Amrutham Chandamamalo			
2014	Manam	Nagarjuna's friend		
2014	Drushyam	Simhadri		
2014	Lovers	Suresh		
2014	Power	Bilahari		
2014	Joru	Namalu		
2014	Lakshmi Raave Maa Intiki			
2014	Chakkiligintha			
2015	Soukhyam	Giri		
2015	Loafer	Raja's friend		
2015	Where Is Vidya Balan			
2015	Cinema Choopistha Mava	Rakhi Pandaga		
2015	Sankarabaranam	Akshay Kumar		
2015	Tripura	Tripura's cousin		
2015	Bruce Lee - The Fighter	Bruce Lee's friend		
2015	Raju Gari Gadhi	"Race Gurram" Babji		
2015	Shivam	Happy		
2015	Mirchi Lanti Kurradu			
2015	Where Is Vidya Balan			
2015	James Bond			
2015	Jadoogadu	Puli		
2015	Jyothi Lakshmi			
2015	Dohchay	Ranga		
2015	Temper	Chain snatcher		
2015	Intelligent Idiots	Mano		
2015	Beeruva			
2015	Mosagallaku Mosagadu			
2015	Ram Leela	Ram's friend		
2015	Gaddam Gang	Venkata Krishna		
2015	Bandipotu	Saptagiri		
2015	Jatha Kalise			
2016	Express Raja	Giri		
2016	Soggade Chinni Nayana	Himagiri		
2016	Krishnashtami	Giri		
2016	Supreme	Man in the airport		
2016	Okka Ammayi Thappa	Journalist		
2016	Selfie Raja	Thief		
2016	Thikka	Manchi Donga		
2016	Majnu	Koti		
2016	Abhinetri	Buchi		
2016	Devi Tutak Tutak Tutiya	Yellow T-shirt man	Cameo appearance; Tamil-Hindi film	
2016	Nandini Nursing Home	Inpatient		
2016	Saptagiri Express	Saptagiri		
2017	Angel	Saptagiri		
2017	Chitrangada	Punjuko Babban		
2017	Rarandoi Veduka Chudham	Bangaram		
2017	Raja the Great	Seenu	Cameo appearance	
2017	Radha	Giri R		
2017	Sapthagiri LLB	Saptagiri L.L.B.		
2018	Hello Guru Prema Kosame	Auto Driver		
2018	Neevevaro	Janaganamana Jagadish		
2018	Juvva			
2018	Inttelligent	Teja's friend		
2019	Abhinetri 2	Buchi		
2019	Vajra Kavachadhara Govinda	Govind		
2019	Tenali Ramakrishna BA. BL	Giri		
2020	Thagite Thandana			
2020	Orey Bujjiga	Saptagiri		
2021	Krack	Subba Reddy		
2021	Alludu Adhurs	Kadra		
2021	Idhe Maa Katha			
2021	Ek Mini Katha			
2021	Sreekaram	Karthik's colleague		
2021	Varudu Kaavalenu			
2021	Guduputani	Giri		
2022	1945	Adhi's friend		
2022	Athidi Devo Bhava			
2022	Pakka Commercial	Lawyer Jhansi's PA		
2022	Katha Kanchiki Manam Intiki			
2022	Wanted Pandugod			
2022	Geetha			
2022	Crazy Fellow	Abhiram's coworker		
2022	Like, Share & Subscribe	Giri		
2023	Veera Simha Reddy	Jai's Supervisor		
2023	Waltair Veerayya	Lekka Giri		
2023	Kalyanam Kamaneeyam	Giri		
2023	Amigos	Believer		
2023	Meter	Arjun’s uncle		
2023	Organic Mama Hybrid Alludu	Haasini's prospective groom		
2023	Ramabanam	Bhairavi’s cousin		
2023	Rangabali	Journalist		
2023	Unstoppable	Jilani Ramdas		
2023	Slum Dog Husband	David Mathew		
2023	Sound Party	Jailer Rajasekhar		
2023	Salaar: Part 1 – Ceasefire	Chandram		
2024	Prathinidhi 2			
2024	Laggam	Sarpanch Vari		
2024	Mr. Celebrity			
2025	Pelli Kani Prasad	Katnam Prasad		
2025	Dear Uma			
2026	The RajaSaab	Brother Rip		
2026	S Saraswathi			
2026	Sathi Leelavathi			

=== As producer ===
- Bhagyanagara Veedullo Gamattu (2019)
