= National Film Award for Best Make-up =

Indian film award

- National award for contributions to Indian Cinema
- Sponsored by: National Film Development Corporation of India
- Formerly called: National Film Award for Best Make-up Artist (2006–2021)
- Rewards: Rajat Kamal (Silver Lotus); ₹2,00,000
- First award: 2006
- Most recent winner: Pasupuleti Ravi Kumar, Committee Kurrollu (2024)

The National Film Award for Best Make-up is one of the National Film Awards presented annually by the National Film Development Corporation of India. It is one of several awards presented for feature films and awarded with Rajat Kamal (Silver Lotus).

The award was instituted in 2006, at 54th National Film Awards and awarded annually for films produced in the year across the country, in all Indian languages. Since the 70th National Film Awards, the name was changed to "National Film Award for Best Make-up".

== Multiple winners ==
• 3 wins : Vikram Gaikwad

== Recipients ==
Award includes 'Rajat Kamal' (Silver Lotus) and cash prize. Following are the award winners over the years:

List of award recipients, showing the year (award ceremony), film(s) and language(s)
Year	Recipient	Film(s)	Language(s)	Refs.
2006 (54th)	Anil Motiram Palande	Traffic Signal	Hindi	
2007 (55th)	Pattanam Rasheed	Paradesi	Malayalam	
2008 (56th)	U. K. Sasi	Naan Kadavul	Tamil	
2009 (57th)	Christien Tinsley	Paa	Hindi	
2009 (57th)	Dominie Till	Paa	Hindi	
2010 (58th)	Vikram Gaikwad	Moner Manush	Bengali	
2011 (59th)	Vikram Gaikwad	Balgandharva	Marathi	
2011 (59th)	Vikram Gaikwad	The Dirty Picture	Hindi	
2012 (60th)	Raja	Vazhakku Enn 18/9	Tamil	
2013 (61st)	Vikram Gaikwad	Jaatishwar	Bengali	
2014 (62nd)	Raju	Naanu Avanalla...Avalu	Kannada	
2014 (62nd)	Nagaraj	Naanu Avanalla...Avalu	Kannada	
2015 (63rd)	Preetisheel Singh	Nanak Shah Fakir	Punjabi	
2015 (63rd)	Clover Wootton	Nanak Shah Fakir	Punjabi	
2016 (64th)	N. K. Ramakrishna	Allama	Kannada	
2017 (65th)	Ram Rajjak	Nagarkirtan	Bengali	
2018 (66th)	Ranjith	Awe	Telugu	
2019 (67th)	Ranjith Ambady	Helen	Malayalam	
2020 (68th)	T. V. Ram Babu	Natyam	Telugu	
2021 (69th)	Preetisheel Singh	Gangubai Kathiawadi	Hindi	
2022 (70th)	Somnath Kundu	Aparajito	Bengali	
2023 (71st)	Shrikant Desai	Sam Bahadur	Hindi	
2024 (72nd)	Pasupuleti Ravi Kumar	Committee Kurrollu	Telugu	
