= Band Melam =

2026 Indian Telugu film by Sathish Javvaji

- Theatrical release poster
- Directed by: Sathish Javvaji
- Screenplay by: Siva Mupparaju
- Story by: Sathish Javvaji
- Produced by: Kavya; Shravya Kona
- Starring: Harsh Roshan; Sridevi Apalla; P. Sai Kumar
- Cinematography: Satish Mutyala
- Edited by: Siva Mupparaju
- Music by: Vijai Bulganin
- Production company: Kona Film Corporation
- Distributed by: Mango Mass Media
- Release date: 26 March 2026
- Running time: 141 minutes
- Country: India
- Language: Telugu

Band Melam is a 2026 Indian Telugu-language romantic drama film written and directed by Sathish Javvaji. Produced by Kona Film Corporation, the film features Harsh Roshan, Sridevi Apalla and P. Sai Kumar.

The film was released on 26 March 2026.

== Plot ==
Set in rural Telangana, Band Melam follows the lives of Yadagiri (Giri) and Rajamma (Raaji), two cousins who are born around the same period and grow up together in a close-knit village environment. Spending much of their childhood side by side, they develop a strong emotional bond. Their families share a close relationship, and their elders quietly hope that the pair will one day be united in marriage.

As the children grow older, life gradually begins to change. Economic hardships and family circumstances create differences between the two households. While Giri's family attempts to preserve its dignity amid struggles, Raaji's family faces financial burdens that influence the choices made for their future. The once carefree childhood relationship between Giri and Raaji slowly becomes affected by responsibilities and changing expectations.

As they enter adulthood, their paths begin to separate. Raaji chooses education as a way to build a better future and gradually moves beyond village life, pursuing opportunities and personal growth. Giri, on the other hand, discovers a passion for music and becomes deeply involved in traditional band performances. Through band melam, he finds purpose and identity, dedicating himself to preserving local musical traditions and building a life around his art.

The distance between them increases over time, leading to misunderstandings and emotional separation. Years later, fate brings Giri and Raaji together once again. Their reunion forces them to confront unresolved feelings, memories of their shared childhood, and the emotional weight of the choices that shaped their lives. The story explores whether relationships formed in childhood can survive the passage of time and changing ambitions, against the backdrop of Telangana's rural culture and musical traditions.

== Cast ==
- Harsh Roshan as Yadagiri "Giri"
- Sridevi Apalla as Raajamma "Raji"
- P. Sai Kumar as Sai, Raaji's father
- Goparaju Vijay as Sundarayya, Yadagiri's father
- Macha Ravi
- Shanthi
- Yogitha
- Avinash Dev
- Vihan Uday
- Viswanath Gandhavarapu
- Pooja Kendre
- Laxman Meesala

== Music ==
The soundtrack and background score were composed by Vijai Bulganin.

Track listing
| No. | Title | Lyrics | Singer(s) | Length |
|---|---|---|---|---|
| 1. | "Thippukuntannav" | Chandrabose | Ramu Rathod, Aditi Bhavaraju | 3:41 |
| 2. | "Pallelloni Sandhallanni Meeve" | Chandrabose | Shweta Mohan | 4:36 |
| 3. | "Rajamma" | Chandrabose | Ram Miriyala | 4:13 |
| 4. | "Ento Emo" | Kasarla Shyam | Sunitha Upadrashta | 3:17 |
| 5. | "Ekkadi Dongalu Akkade GapChup" | Kasarla Shyam | Mangli | 2:30 |
| 6. | "Band Melam Rap Song" | Aakhil Baig | Aakhil Baig | 2:35 |
| 7. | "Janu O My Janu (Happy Song)" | Kasarla Shyam | Saketh Komanduri | 1:23 |
| 8. | "Janu O My Janu (Sad Song)" | Kasarla Shyam | Saketh Komanduri | 2:00 |
| 9. | "Thalarathe" | Sreejo | Vijai Bulganin | 2:52 |

== Release ==
Band Melam was initially schedule to release in theaters on 13 March 2026 but was released on 26 March 2026 coinciding with Sri Rama Navami. It was released on ZEE5 on 24 April 2026.

== Reception ==
Sekhar Kusuma of Samayam Telugu rated the film 2 out of 5 and called it a "routine film" citing weak writing. Telugucinema.com rated the movie 1.5/5, criticizing the weak script, "amateurish" direction, and the lead actors' performances, noting that the 140-minute runtime felt "exhausting". Sakshi Post also gave the same rating and stated that, "Despite decent performances and a few passable moments early on, the film is dragged down by a routine story, a lifeless second half, and lack of emotional depth". Sreejith of The New Indian Express gave the film a rating of 1/5, describing it as a "tedious and disconnected narrative" that failed to utilize its rural setting effectively.
