= Kanya Kumari (film) =

2025 Indian Telugu film by Srujan Attada

- Theatrical release poster
- Directed by: Srujan Attada
- Written by: Srujan Attada
- Produced by: Srujan Attada; Sateesh Reddy Chinta
- Starring: Geeth Saini; Sreecharan Rachakonda
- Cinematography: Shiva Gajula; Haricharan K
- Edited by: Naresh Adupa
- Music by: Ravi Nidamarthy
- Production company: Radical Pictures
- Release date: 27 August 2025
- Running time: 133 minutes
- Country: India
- Language: Telugu

Kanya Kumari is a 2025 Indian Telugu-language coming-of-age romantic film drama film written, produced and directed by Srujan Attada. It stars Geeth Saini and Sreecharan Rachakonda in lead roles.

The film was released on 27 August 2025.

== Plot ==
The plot centres on Kanya Kumari, a village girl aspiring to be a software engineer, and her childhood friend Tirupati, a devoted farmer content with village life, as they navigate their contrasting dreams, familial expectations, and societal differences while falling in love, exploring themes of ambition vs. roots, family duty, and finding balance. The film follows their romantic journey as they face challenges and ultimately try to reconcile their differing life paths.

== Cast ==
- Geeth Saini as Kanya Kumari
- Sreecharan Rachakonda as Tirupati
- Bhadram
- Muralidhar Goud as Bride's father
- Prabhavathi Varma as Bride's mother
- Vasu Sri
- Sai Krishna Yashodha as Seenu

== Music ==
The background score and soundtrack were composed by Ravi Nidamarthy.

All lyrics are written by Srujan Attada.

No.	Title	Singer(s)	Length
1.	"Yadha Yadha Savvadi"	Anurag Kulkarni, Jayasri Pallem	3:34
2.	"Kathilanti Pillave"	Dhanunjay Seepana	3:22
3.	"Kalala Kurisina"	Sri Krishna, Jayasri Pallem	4:08
4.	"Premalo"	Kaala Bhairava	2:35

== Release and reception ==
Kanya Kumari was released on 27 August 2025. It was later released on Aha and Amazon Prime Video on 17 September 2025.

Bhargav Chaganti of NTV rated it 2.75 out if 5 and appreciated lead cast performances and music. Namasthe Telangana noted technical production and Geeth Saini's performance.
