= Comrade Kalyan =

2026 Indian film by Janakiram Marella

- Theatrical release poster
- Directed by: Janaki Ram Marella
- Written by: Bhanu Bhogavarapu; Nandu Savirigana
- Produced by: Venkata Krishna Kamati; Seetha Karnati
- Starring: Sree Vishnu; Mahima Nambiar
- Cinematography: Sai Sriram
- Edited by: Chota K. Prasad
- Music by: Vijai Bulganin
- Production companies: Kona Film Corporation; Skanda Vahana Motion Pictures LLP
- Release date: 9 October 2026
- Country: India
- Language: Telugu
- Box office: ₹17 crore

Comrade Kalyan is a 2026 Indian Telugu language period action comedy film directed by Janakiram Marella. It stars Sree Vishnu, Mahima Nambiar, Radikaa Sarathkumar. The music for the film was composed by Vijay Bulganin and edited by Chota K. Prasad

The film was theatrically released on 9 October 2026 to mixed to positive emerged as a commercial success at the box office.

== Plot ==
In 1994, in Madugula, near the state border of Andhra Pradesh-Odisha, IPS officer George Kutty's car is blasted by Naxalites, an insurgent group who are waging guerrilla war to overthrow the Government of India. The blast kills George Kutty's pregnant wife and leaves him and his son injured.

In the same village, Kalyan is a theatre operator who dreams of owning a cinema hall where he operates shows. Kalyan's routine is frequently disturbed by his Mother Saraswatamma’s quarrel with the fans of rival movie stars, whose fights always land her at the Police Station. One day, while returning from the Police Station, Saraswatamma suffers a heart stroke and Kalyan seeks help from vehicles on the road. Sitara Devi, who does not speak Telugu, helps his mom by giving her CPR. Kalyan falls in love with Sitara.

He tries hard to make a connect but couldn’t as he believes Sitara is an Odia. They can’t understand each other due to the language barrier. Later, he learns that Sitara speaks Telugu and her family is under threat from a financier called Biswas. Sitara says that they took a loan to finance her estranged brother's MBBS degree. Kalyan promises to pay a sum of ₹5 lakh and save her from being forced into a marriage with Biswas. He hopes that his friend Dubai Babu will be able to help him financially but Babu turns out to be a fraud who made the money by pretending to be a naxalite.

Desperate to arrange the money, Kalyan decides to impersonate a naxalite so that he could take advantage of the surrender and rehabilitation schemes provided by the Government. As the financial benefit which Kalyan sought is higher, Inspector Appal Naidu makes him accused in several criminal cases, including the George Kutty car blast case. Kalyan, including 3 other men, who seek to surrender pretending to be Naxalites are dropped in the forest.

On the planned day of surrender, George Kutty intervenes and seeks to kill them in an encounter. They attack the impersonating naxalites and swiftly kill the other three men, leaving Kalyan stranded. However, Masterji's Dalam (lit. 'Squad') ambushes the police forces and saves Kalyan, and George Kutty is forced to retreat. Later, Masterji and Comrade Shankar force Kalyan to prove his loyalty to naxalist movment by shooting Dubai Babu, an impersonating naxalite caught by them. But Kalyan argues that Dubai Babu's life should be spared so that his death could be used for a better cause, like a suicide mission. Masterji is convinced and prepares them both as suicide bombers to kill a Minister in his upcoming meeting. Kalyan and Babu escape that night, and sneak into the Minister's residence to confess. However, a comic turn of events leads to Kalyan and Babu kidnapping the Minister and they are caught by Masterji's Dalam again. When confronted, Kalyan says that instead of killing the Minister, he can be exchanged to release the imprisoned naxalites in Visakhapatnam Jail. The same night, Kalyan also confesses to Masterji, and he intends to leave to save Sitara.

However, during the exchange, George Kutty kills the prisoners and Masterji, while saving the Minister. Masterji asks Shankar to take care of Kalyan. Later that night, Shankar learns the truth and attacks Kalyan. Kalyan knocks him out and leaves for Behrampur, Odisha to stop Sitara's marriage with Biswas. Unknown to Kalyan, George Kutty conspires with Biswas to kill Kalyan by disguising himself and his team as guests at the wedding. During the wedding, Shankar shows up to kill Kalyan, and Kalyan learns that Shankar is Sitara's estranged brother. George Kutty's team opens fire on Kalyan, Shankar and other naxalites, and in the ensuing fight, George Kutty's son is injured. With no other doctor nearby, Kalyan requests Shankar to leave everything aside and save the boy as he is a doctor first. Shankar treats the boy. Kalyan makes Shankar and George Kutty realize the futileness of their fight. They make peace and Kalyan marries Sitara. With the financial aid received by the government, Kalyan decides to help the families of fellow impersonators who were killed by the police.

== Cast ==
- Sree Vishnu as Kalyan
- Mahima Nambiar as Sitara Devi
- Radikaa Sarathkumar as Saraswatamma
- Shine Tom Chacko as George Kutty IPS
- Vennela Kishore as ACP Pradyuman
- Upendra Limaye as Biswas
- Satya as Dubai Babu
- Brahmaji as Inspector Appalanaidu
- Srikanth Iyengar as Minister
- Shatru as Shankar
- Sai Chand as Masterji

== Production ==
The film was produced by Skanda Vahana Motion Pictures LLP.

== Release ==
=== Theatrical ===
The film was theatrically released on 9 October 2026.

=== Home media ===
The post-theatrical streaming rights of the film were acquired by Amazon Prime Video.

== Reception ==
=== Critical reception ===
Shreya Varanasi of Times of India, rated the film 2.5/5 and wrote, "Strong performances keep this uneven rural comedy watchable." Writing for the The Hindu, Srinivas Nandhadur opined that the film is self-aware, and relied on catchy one liners and the strengths of its ensemble cast. T Maruthi Acharya of India Today, however, was critical of the film, saying the film's unusual idea was undercut by familiar jokes and an uneven screenplay.
