= Unstoppable (2023 film) =

- Directed by: Diamond Ratnababu
- Written by: Diamond Ratnababu
- Produced by: Rajith Rao
- Starring: VJ Sunny; Saptagiri; Nakshatra; Posani Krishna Murali; Bithiri Sathi; Aqsa Khan
- Cinematography: V. Venu Muralidhar
- Edited by: S. B. Uddhav
- Music by: Bheems Ceciroleo
- Production company: AB2 Productions
- Release date: 9 June 2023
- Running time: 110 minutes
- Country: India
- Language: Telugu

Unstoppable is a 2023 Indian Telugu-language comedy-drama film directed by Diamond Ratnababu and produced by Rajith Rao under AB2 Productions.

The movie features VJ Sunny, Saptagiri, Nakshatra, Posani Krishna Murali, Bithiri Sathi and Aqsa Khan. The film was released theatrically worldwide on 9 June 2023.

== Cast ==
- VJ Sunny as Kohinoor Kalyan
- Saptagiri as Jilani Ramdas
- Nakshatra Trinayani
- Shakalaka Shankar as Honey
- Vikram Aditya as Gnanavel Raja a.k.a. Khadar
- Posani Krishna Murali as Vittal
- Bithiri Sathi
- Aqsa Khan as Apple
- Prudhvi Raj as IIakatamafiya Baba
- Raja Ravindra
- Raghu Babu as Sarangapani
- Chammak Chandra as Honey Babu
- Shakalaka Shankar
- Muralidhar Goud
- Suresh Kondeti
- Chakrapani Ananda
- Thotapalli Madhu
- Geetha Singh as Traffic Police Inspector

== Soundtrack ==
The music for the film was composed by Bheems Ceciroleo.

- "Bull Bull Unstoppable"

== Reception ==
A critic from The Times of India wrote that "Overall, with comedy, action, and a dose of over-the-top entertainment, the film delivers a vibrant and energetic narrative that might appeal to those seeking a lighthearted and logic-defying experience".
