= Janaka Aithe Ganaka =

Indian romantic comedy film

- Theatrical release poster
- Directed by: Sandeep Reddy Bandla
- Written by: Sandeep Reddy Bandla
- Produced by: Harshith Reddy; Hanshitha Reddy
- Starring: Suhas; Sangeerthana Vipin; Vennela Kishore; Rajendra Prasad; Murali Sharma; Goparaju Ramana
- Cinematography: Sai Sriram
- Edited by: Kodati Pavan Kalyan
- Music by: Vijai Bulganin
- Production company: Dil Raju Productions
- Release date: 12 October 2024
- Running time: 138 minutes
- Country: India
- Language: Telugu
- Box office: est. ₹5.50 crore (9 days)

Janaka Aithe Ganaka is a 2024 Indian Telugu-language romantic comedy drama film written and directed by Sandeep Reddy Bandla and produced by Harshith Reddy and Hanshitha Reddy, under Dil Raju Productions. It starred Suhas an ensemble cast of Sangeerthana Vipin, Vennela Kishore, Rajendra Prasad, Murali Sharma and Goparaju Ramana. The music was composed by Vijai Bulganin and the cinematography was handled by Sai Sriram.

It was theatrically released on 12 October 2024 to mixed reviews from critics. and grossed over ₹5.50 crore at the box office in its first 9 days.

== Plot ==
Prasad (Suhas) is a young man who feels trapped living a middle-class life due to a wrong financial decision made by his father (Goparaju Ramana). He works at a washing machine company and enjoys life with his wife (Sangeerthana), his friend, and a quirky lawyer named Pathi Kishore (Vennela Kishore). Due to their financial struggles, Prasad and his wife decide not to have children to avoid additional burdens. However, when his wife unexpectedly becomes pregnant, Prasad is shocked and files a lawsuit against a condom company, demanding compensation of one crore rupees.

== Cast ==
- Suhas as Prasad
- Sangeerthana Vipin as Prasad's wife
- Vennela Kishore as Kishore, Prasad's friend
- Rajendra Prasad as Judge
- Murali Sharma as Opposition lawyer
- Goparaju Ramana as Prasad's father
- Tenali Shakuntala
- Rupa Lakshmi

== Music ==
The film's soundtrack was composed by Vijai Bulganin.

No.	Title	Lyrics	Singer(s)	Length
1.	"Naa Favourite Naa Pellam"	Krishna Kanth	Adithya RK	4:01
2.	"Nuvve Naku Lokam"	Krishna Kanth	Karthik	4:04
3.	"Em Paapam Chesamo"	Krishna Kanth	Ritesh G Rao	3:20
4.	"Santosham Ee Poota"	Krishna Kanth	Ritesh G Rao	3:13
5.	"Jag Spl Promotional Song"	Krishna Kanth	Roll Rida	2:49
Total length:				11:25

== Release ==
Janaka Aithe Ganaka was theatrically released on 12 October 2024.

== Reception ==
=== Critical reception ===
Paul Nicodemus of The Times of India gave the film a 3 out of 5 stating, "Janaka Aithe Ganaka had the potential to be a witty commentary on the societal pressures of parenthood but falls short of delivering on that promise. Performances by the cast, especially Suhas and Vennela Kishore, provide much-needed relief, saving the film from its underwhelming courtroom sequences. If you’re looking for light-hearted entertainment, the film does offer a few laughs, but it’s best to temper your expectations. While the concept is interesting, the execution leaves much to be desired. Srivathsan Nadadhur of The Hindu gave a mixed review stating, "If handled well, Janaka Aithe Ganaka could have been a conversation starter on several pertinent issues — the idea of not having children, the stigma around condom usage and misleading advertisements. For now, it is just another missed opportunity."
