= Gopala Gopala (soundtrack) =

- Album Cover

Soundtrack album by Anoop Rubens
- Released: 25 December 2014
- Recorded: 2014
- Genre: Feature film soundtrack
- Length: 15:14
- Language: Telugu
- Label: Lahari Music
- Producer: Anup Rubens

Anoop Rubens chronology
Chinnadana Nee Kosam (2014)	Gopala Gopala (2014)	Temper (2015)

Gopala Gopala is the feature film soundtrack of the 2015 Telugu satirical drama film of the same name. Anup Rubens composed the soundtrack, which was released on 25 December 2014. It consists of 4 songs whose lyrics were penned by Chandrabose, Sirivennela Sitaramasastri and Anantha Sreeram.

== Development ==
In mid-April 2014, Sohail Sen was selected to compose the music for the film which was his Telugu debut. He also met the makers in Hyderabad for the music sittings later. But Anoop Rubens replaced him in June 2014 as the music director of the film. The makers said that he composed and recorded a song before the launch of the film and it was also said that all the songs would be recorded in a week's time from the launch. The film's soundtrack was reported to feature 3 songs in total and Pawan Kalyan was reported to appear in two of them. A unique audio launch was planned by the makers which was different from routine events. Kailash Kher completed recording for a special song in the soundtrack on 12 December 2014. Apart from the single track Bhaje Bhaaje written by Anantha Sreeram, the lyrics for the other two songs were penned by Sirivennela Sitaramasastri and Chandrabose; Sonu Nigam was the other playback singer apart from Kailash Kher and Haricharan.

== Release ==
Lahari Music acquired the film's audio rights along with Drushyam for an amount of ₹80 lakh (US$95,000). In mid November 2014, the soundtrack album was announced to be released in the end of November 2014. The release date was confirmed as 5 December 2014 in late November 2014. But it was postponed later to 11 December 2014. The song Bhaje Bhaaje sung by Dhanunjay and Haricharan and penned by Anantha Sreeram was released on 15 December 2014 as a single track. The song was listened by 1 lakh viewers in YouTube within 10 hours of its release and received 2,500 likes. The audio launch event was held on 25 December 2014 at Ramanaidu Studios in Nanakramguda, Hyderabad.

== Track listing ==
No.	Title	Lyrics	Singer(s)	Length
1.	"Enduko Enduko"	Chandrabose	Kailash Kher	4:24
2.	"Needhe Needhe"	Sirivennela Seetharama Sastry	Sonu Nigam	4:14
3.	"Bhaje Bhaaje"	Ananta Sriram	Dhanunjay Seepana	4:00
4.	"Gopala Gopala - Flute Theme" (Instrumental)		Paras Nath	2:36
Total length:				15:14

== Reception ==
The soundtrack received positive reviews. Sasidhar A. S. of The Times of India rated the album 3 out of 5 and selected "Enduko Enduko" as the best song of the soundtrack. Behindwoods rated the album 2.75 out of 5 and stated "Gopala Gopala is a feel good album from Anup Rubens which works like a charm". IndiaGlitz rated the album 3.25 out of 5 and called it "An album that has two hummable and enjoyable songs, it has lyrics that are for the discerning as well as the casual listener".
