= Anudeep Dev =

- Origin: Kurnool, Andhra Pradesh, India
- Occupations: Music Composer, Singer
- Instruments: vocals, guitar, piano
- Years active: 2015–present

Anudeep Dev is an Indian music composer and singer who works in Telugu cinema. He composed music for the Pan-India movie Hanu-Man (two songs), Committee Kurrollu, Raakaasa and the web series Super Subbu. He did playback singing in about 70 feature films and has sung 100 songs. Some of the feature films with his songs are Baby,Thunivu, Thiruchitrambalam, Ratsasan, Sailaja Reddy Alludu, Adhe Kangal (2017 film), Temper, Uyyala Jampala and Pilla Nuvvu Leni Jeevitham.

== Career ==
Anudeep was born in Kurnool, Andhra Pradesh. He completed his bachelor's degree in Hyderabad. He mentored Team 'Metro Melodies' on the musical/singing reality television show Sa Re Ga Ma Pa Telugu season 16. He is associated with his college rock band called 'Anudeep and the band'. He has worked for music directors including Thaman, Ghibran, Anup Rubens, M. M. Keeravani, Jeevan Babu, Shekar Chandra, Radhan and Mickey J. Meyer.

== Discography ==
=== As composer ===
Year	Title	Notes
2021–2022	Unstoppable	Talk show
2023	From The Bottom Of My Heart	EP (Sony Music)
2024	Hanu-Man	Feature film
2024	Committee Kurrollu	Feature film
2026	Raakaasa	
2026	BharataVarsha	Feature film
2026	Hailesso	Feature film
2026	Super Subbu	Netflix Web series
2027	Bhari	Feature film

=== As playback singer ===
==== Film songs ====
Year	Film	Song	Composer	Language
2011	Aha Naa Pellanta	Saturday Evening	Raghu Kunche	Telugu
2013	Potugadu	Sloka Theme	Achu	Telugu
2013	Uyyala Jampala	Uyyalaina Jampalaina	Sunny MR	Telugu
2014				Telugu
2014	Kulfi	Logunna Life	Yuvan Shankar Raja	Telugu
2014	Chakkiligintha	Avoid Girls	Mickey J. Meyer	Telugu
2014	Pyar Mein Padipoyane	Nuvve Nuvve	Anoop Rubens	Telugu
2014	Lovers	Title Song	Jeevan Babu	Telugu
2014	Chinnadana Nee Kosam	Everybody Chalo All I Wanna Say	Anoop Rubens	Telugu
2014	Pilla Nuvvu Leni Jeevitham	pilla née kosame	Anoop Rubens	Telugu
2014	Dhee Ante Dhee	Dhee Ante Dhee	Chakri	Telugu
2015				Telugu
2015	Tiger	Samaya Samaya	Thaman S	Telugu
2015	Mama Manchu Alludu Kanchu	Title Theme	Achu Rajamani	Telugu
2015	Cinema Chupistha Maava	E Velalona	Shekar Chandra	Telugu
2015	Temper	Ittage Rechipodam	Anoop Rubens	Telugu
2015	Sher	Naina Naina	Thaman S	Telugu
2016	Soggade Chinni Nayana	Addhira Banna	Anoop Rubens	Telugu
2016	Speedunnodu	Gurrani cheruvu daka	Dj Vasanth	Telugu
2017	Agent Bhairava	Pu Pu Puvvalatho	Santhosh Narayanan	Telugu
2017	Ungarala Rambabu	Hitension theega	Ghibran	Telugu
2017	Hyper	Comeback Comeback	Ghibran	Telugu
2018	Ratsasan	Piriyame Piriyame	Ghibran	Tamil
2018	Khaakee (D)	Tholi Vayase	Ghibran	Telugu
2018	Khaakee (D)	Laali Laali	Ghibran	Telugu
2018	Sailaja Reddy Alludu	Anu Baby	Gopi Sundar	Telugu
2019	Lover's Day (D)	Manikya Manikanthi	Shaan Rahman	Telugu
2019	Mr. KK	Okka Nuvvu Chaalu	Ghibran	Telugu
2021	Zombie Reddy	GO Corona	Mark K. Robin	Telugu
2022	Thiru (D)	Megham Karigena	Anirudh Ravichander	Telugu
2022	Pattathu Arasan	Thuliya Mazha Thuliya	Ghibran	Tamil
2022	Godfather	"Godfather - Title Song"	Thaman S	Telugu
2022	Godfather (D)	"Godfather - Title Song"	Thaman S	Hindi
2023	Thunivu (D)	Cash Ante Daivam	Ghibran	Telugu
2023	Baby	Chanti Pillala	Vijai Bulganin	Telugu
2024	Committee Kurrollu	Prema Gaaradi	Anudeep Dev	Telugu
2024	Committee Kurrollu	Sandhadi Sandhadi	Anudeep Dev	Telugu
2025	Sri Sri Sri Raja Vaaru	"Mana Sri Sri Sri Raja Vaaru"	Kailas Menon	Telugu
2025	Sasivadane	"Godari Atu Vaipo"	Anudeep Dev	Telugu
2025	The Great Pre-Wedding Show	"Naa Valane"	Suresh Bobbili	Telugu
