= Saptagiri Express (film) =

- Theatrical release poster
- Directed by: Arun Pawar
- Written by: Saptagiri; Caarthick Raju
- Produced by: Dr. K. Ravi Kirane
- Starring: Saptagiri; Roshni Prakash; Posani Krishna Murali; Sayaji Shinde
- Cinematography: C. Ramprasad
- Edited by: Gautham Raju
- Music by: Vijai Bulganin
- Production company: Sai Celluloid Cinematic Creations
- Release date: 23 December 2016
- Running time: 131 min
- Country: India
- Language: Telugu

Saptagiri Express is a 2016 Indian Telugu-language action comedy film directed by Arun Pawar and produced by Dr. K. Ravi Kirane under the Sai Celluloid Cinematic Creations Banner with music composed by Bulganin and this movie is named after the express train of Indian Railways it was the Sapthagiri Express. The film marks actor and comedian Saptagiri's first hero role. Saptagiri also wrote the film, which is an adaptation of the Tamil film Thirudan Police, and features him in the role of a constable.

== Cast ==
- Saptagiri as Saptagiri
- Roshni Prakash as Poornima
- Naramalli Sivaprasad as Constable Sivaprasad
- Ali as Doctor
- Shakalaka Shankar as Kaanipaakam
- Posani Krishna Murali as DCP Papayamma
- Sayaji Shinde as SP Umesh Chandra
- Ajay Ghosh
- Tulasi as Saptagiri's mother
- Hema as Papayamma's wife
- Madhunandan as Doctor
- Raghav Uday
- Thagubothu Ramesh as Awards host

== Production ==
The film was originally titled Katamarayudu, but the title was changed after Pawar and Sapthagiri learned that Pawan Kalyan was starring in a film by the same name. Filming for Saptagiri Express concluded around the beginning of October 2016 with a projected release date of November the same year.

== Soundtrack ==
No.	Title	Singer(s)	Length
1.	"Be Positive"	Yazin Nizar
2.	"Papa Nuvu"	Rahul Nambiar
3.	"Velugu Cheekati"	Vijai Bulganin
4.	"Kekekkindo Lammi"	Ranjith, Geetha Madhuri
5.	"Theme Song"	Vijai Bulganin

== Critical reception ==
Srividya Palaparthi of The Times of India rated the film 2/5 stars and wrote, "A film that is merely two hours and eleven minutes long, because of all the hullabaloo feels extremely long. [...] Sapthagiri Express feels like you’re watching a showreel of the actor’s comedy sketches. This one is strictly for those who love brainless comedy and Sapthagiri." Y. Sunita Chowdhary of The Hindu also gave it 2/5 stars and wrote, "The father-son relationship and Saptagiri’s monologue impress but the director fails to keep the audience interested till the end."
