= Vijai Bulganin =

Indian music composer

- Born: Gorthi Vijay; 9 October; Vedurupaka, Andhra Pradesh, India
- Occupations: Vocalist, film scorer
- Instrument: Vocals
- Years active: 2016–present
- Labels: Aditya Music, Lahari Music, Sony Music India

Vijai Bulganin is an Indian composer and singer who works in Telugu cinema. He has produced few independent music videos and later continued as a composer in Telugu films. He received wider recognition for his work in the film Baby (2023), for which he received Filmfare Award for Best Music Director – Telugu.

== Early life and career ==
Bulganin was born as Gorthi Vijay in Vedurupaka, Andhra Pradesh in a Telugu family. Later, he changed his stage name to Vijai Bulganin. Around 2014, he has moved to Hyderabad to pursue a career in music and cinema. Vaaradhi (2015) was his first film as a music composer. Speaking to Cinema Express, Vijai said that Baby album is "a homage to the Ilaiyaraaja genre of music". 123telugu in their review of the film mentioned that "music by Vijay is a major asset for Baby". Film Companion cited him as "the strongest pillar of Baby". Songs from the film were commercially successful, thus getting him wide recognition.

== Discography ==
=== As composer ===
List of original soundtracks and scores
Year	Title	Score	Songs	Notes
2015	Vaaradhi	Yes	Yes	
2016	Saptagiri Express	Yes	Yes	
2017	Rendu Rellu Aaru	Yes	Yes	
2017	Sapthagiri LLB	Yes	Yes	
2019	Vajra Kavachadhara Govinda	Yes	Yes	
2022	Meet Cute	Yes	Yes	TV series
2023	Baby	Yes	Yes	
2023	Vidyarthi	Yes	Yes	
2023	Ishtame Kaani Prema Ledanta	Yes	Yes	YouTube TV series
2024	Maruva Tarama	Yes	Yes	
2024	Bhoothaddam Bhaskar Narayana	No	Yes	Only two songs
2024	Prasanna Vadanam	Yes	Yes	
2024	Janaka Aithe Ganaka	Yes	Yes	
2025	Court	Yes	Yes	
2025	Beauty	Yes	Yes	
2026	Band Melam	Yes	Yes	
2026	Comrade Kalyan	Yes	Yes	

=== As playback singer ===
Year	Work	Song	Composer	Co-artist(s)
2016	Saptagiri Express	"Velugu Cheekati"	Himself	
2016	Saptagiri Express	"Theme Song"	Himself	
2017	Sapthagiri LLB	"Aa Cheithi Gaajula"	Himself	Lokeshwar, Mangli
2017	Sapthagiri LLB	"Emaindi Emaindi"	Himself	Kailash Kher
2017	Sapthagiri LLB	"Are Are Ek Dham"	Himself	Divya Kumar, M. M. Manasi
2019	Vajra Kavachadhara Govinda	"Keechu Rayi"	Himself	
2026	Band Melam	"Thalarathe"	Himself	
2026	comrade kalyan	"Oriya Pilla" & Title Song	Himself	

=== Singles ===
Year	Song	Composer	Singer	Co-artist(s)	Notes
2019	"Manase Oka Megham"	Yes	Yes		
2021	"Chustu Chustune Rojulu"	Yes	Yes	Meghana	
2021	"Daare Leda"	Yes	No		Released in Tamil as "Vaanam Thondraadhoa"
2021	"Thattukoledhey"	Yes	Yes		
2021	"Ammadi"	Yes	Yes	Nutana Mohan	
2021	"Manasaara Chebutunna"	Yes	Yes	Nutana Mohan	
2021	"Toyiba"	Yes	Yes	Lakshmi Meghana	
2022	"Yemaiundacho"	Yes	Yes		Released in Tamil as "Inneram Indha Neram"
2022	"Lollipop"	Yes	No		Also released in Hindi, Tamil, Kannada, and Malayalam
2022	"Madhubala"	Yes	Yes		Also released in Tamil
2023	"Emone"	Yes	Yes	Aditi Bhavaraju	
2023	"Ole Ole"	Yes	No		Released in Tamil as "Oye Oye"
2023	"Myra"	Yes	Yes	Sindhuja Srinivasan	Also co-producer
2023	"Vennela"	Yes	No		
2024	"Chilaka"	Yes	Yes	Lakshmi Meghana	
2024	"Intermediate"	Yes	No		
2024	"Kala Anukona"	Yes	No		

== Awards and nominations ==
Year	Awards	Category	Work	Result	Ref.
2024	69th Filmfare Awards South	Best Music Director – Telugu	Baby	Won	
2024	12th South Indian International Movie Awards	Best Music Director – Telugu	Baby	Nominated	
