= Abbai Class Ammai Mass =

2013 Indian film

- Film poster
- Directed by: Koneti Srinu
- Written by: Koneti Srinu
- Produced by: Laxman Kyadari
- Starring: Varun Sandesh; Hariprriya
- Music by: Shekar Chandra
- Production company: Lakshmi Cini Visions
- Release date: August 3, 2013
- Running time: 125 minutes
- Country: India
- Language: Telugu

Abbai Class Ammai Mass is a 2013 Indian Telugu romantic comedy film written and directed by Koneti Srinu, making his debut. The film was produced by Lakshman Kyadri. It features Varun Sandesh and Hariprriya in the lead roles. The supporting cast includes Ali and Srinivasa Reddy. The score and soundtrack for the film is by Shekar Chandra.

== Plot ==
This story starts with Sri narrating his story to Shashank, a passerby who takes a lift from him, who believes there is no love and becomes frustrated with his affair. Later, he was surprised to see Sri going to jail for an inquiry. Shashank is curious about his actions toward him and asks about his love story. Then Sri narrates his story to him.

Two years ago, Sri was a successful business entrepreneur but shy towards girls and could not reciprocate his thoughts and feelings with them. His grandmother is very protective of Sri and fears that he will also follow in the footsteps of his grandfather's and father's, who are womanizers. Due to that reason, she raises her grandson as a woman-fearing person. He has a duty to protect his company from losses due to recession and decides to find new investors. In one of those meetings, Sri cannot give a presentation, finding women as some of the executives on the board. So the business meeting failed, and with no other option left, he comes to the knees of KK, a giant investor. Instead of investing, KK comes up with a marriage proposal with his daughter Anjali, who earlier proposed to Sri, whom he rejected through his actions toward her. Then, to protect his company, he accepts the proposal from KK.

Later, he decided to overcome his fears about girls, who took help from his best friend Hrishikesh Mukherjee, a womanizer, and then he set up a deal for a month with Neeru, a high-class harlot. Initially, Sri avoids Neeru due to his weakness, but after trying to cope with her after observing her good nature, Neeru initially hesitates to not show up for her. She decides to close the deal, but after knowing his situation through Hrishikesh, she decides to help him overcome his weakness. Later, Sri takes Neeru to Goa for his business meeting there, and they eventually make over. Neeru encourages Sri to overcome his fears. With this newfound perspective, Sri eventually overcomes his fears and makes a successful presentation. Later, they become friends despite having differences; Sri changes Neeru into a modern outfit, and he takes her appearance.

Meanwhile, Hrishikesh now decides to stop womanizing life, informs them that he is getting married, and invites them to his hometown, which they eventually accept. They directly reach his hometown from Goa. In the marriage process, Sri and Neeru realize that they have fallen for each other. Hrishikesh's family shows affection on Sri and Neeru, thinking that they are married. Neeru becomes emotional after having never experienced this affection before.

After the marriage comes back to Hyderabad, Sri proposes to Neeru for marriage. In the emotional confrontation, Neeru kisses Sri. Meanwhile, Haridas, a contract killer (copied from Bob Biswas), is desperate to search for Neeru to kill, who was involved in a conspiracy unknowingly, to remove all the traces regarding a sting that was blackmailed by a contractor to the MLA who was involved with Neeru. Then he appointed Haridas to kill all the people behind the conspiracy, including Neeru. Haridas killed all the people except her. Then Haridas and the MLA attack Neeru with his men, and Sri comes to her rescue and fights with them. Then, in desperate to protect Neeru, he kills the MLA and escapes with Neeru while chasing them Haridas met with an accident and died on the spot. Then Neeru fears for Sri's life and rejects his proposal, leaving him later to surrender to the cops for Sri's murder. After this incident, Sri rejects the KK's proposal, and eventually his grandmother accepts Sri's marriage to Neeru.

After hearing Sri's story, Shashank now realizes his mistake and decides to change his affair into a relationship. He wishes Sri's love story would become successful. Sri drops Shashank at his destination and encourages Shashank to propose to his girl friend. Later, Sri meets Neeru at a bus stop who is looking for clients; he proposes again for the marriage, but Neeru turns down his proposal, saying that despite loving Sri being a harlot, he cannot become an equal life partner to him and leaves the place with tearing eyes.

Then the film ends with a note that "we hope the pair will be united soon."

== Cast ==
- Varun Sandesh as Sri
- Hariprriya as Neeru
- Ali as Jakkampudi Vamanachari "Java"
- Srinivasa Reddy as Hrishikesh Mukherjee
- Ahuthi Prasad as KK
- Yanamadala Kasi Viswanath as Haridas
- Vennela Kishore as Nakkamurthula Shashank
- Dhanraj as Anji
- Banerjee as MLA
- Sri Lakshmi as Sri's grandma

== Soundtrack ==
Abbai Class Ammai Mass

Soundtrack album by Shekar Chandra
- Released: 2013
- Genre: Feature film soundtrack
- Language: Telugu
- Label: Aditya Music
- Producer: Shekar Chandra

Shekar Chandra chronology
3G Love (2013)	Abbai Class Ammai Mass (2013)	Pelli Pustakam (2013)

The film's background score and the soundtracks are composed by Shekar Chandra. The music rights were acquired by Aditya Music.

All lyrics are written by Bhaskarbatla Ravikumar.

Tracklist
No.	Title	Singer(s)	Length
1.	"Emo Emo"	Haricharan
2.	"Girls Ante Naku"	Deepu
3.	"Main Hu Na"	Sravana Bhargavi
4.	"Manasulona"	Renjith
5.	"Silk seera Jarrutunnadi"	Umaneha
