= Hebah Patel =

Indian actress (born 1995)

- Born: 6 November 1995 (age 30); Mumbai, Maharashtra, India
- Education: Sophia College for Women, Mumbai
- Occupations: Actress; model
- Years active: 2014–present

Hebah Patel (born 6 January 1995) is an Indian actress who predominantly appears in Telugu films. After working as a model, Patel made her acting debut in 2014, with the Kannada film Adyaksha and then made her Tamil film debut Thirumanam Enum Nikkah, also in 2014. Patel made her Telugu film debut with Ala Ela (2014) and received critical acclaim for her role in Kumari 21F (2015). She received Best Debut Actress – Telugu at the Santosham Film Awards for her performance in both these films. Her notable work includes Eedo Rakam Aado Rakam, Ekkadiki Pothavu Chinnavada (both 2016), Andhhagadu, Angel (both 2017) and 24 Kisses (2018). She made her web debut with Masti's (2020).

== Early life ==
Patel was born on 6 January 1995 in Mumbai, Maharashtra. She belongs to a Kannada-speaking Muslim family, but people mistake her to be a Gujarati, due to her last name. She completed her graduation from Sophia College for Women, Mumbai.

== Career ==
=== Early work and breakthrough (2014–2017) ===
Patel made her acting debut with the 2014 Kannada film Adyaksha, appearing as Aishwarya, and also marking her Kannada film debut. She had her Tamil debut with Thirumanam Enum Nikkah playing Naseema, a critically successful film and Telugu film debut with Ala Ela, where she was seen as Shruti, in the same year.

Hebah had her breakthrough with the role of Meena Kumari, an assault victim in the coming-of-age love story Kumari 21F with Raj Tarun. It released in 2015 to positive reviews for her performance. A reviewer for the Deccan Chronicle wrote that Patel "steals the show" in the film.

Patel had a successful year, in 2016 with 3 releases. She was first seen as Supriya in Eedo Rakam Aado Rakam alongside Raj Tarun, which received praises for its comic content. She next appeared as Nithya / Amala in Ekkadiki Pothavu Chinnavada opposite Nikhil Siddharth, it was a critical and commercial success. Her final film of the year was Naanna Nenu Naa Boyfriends, where she was seen as Padmavati / Paddu, it was a female-oriented film. Hebah again had 3 releases in 2017, with Mister being the first release, she was seen as Meera opposite Varun Tej. It received mixed reviews. She appeared as Dr. Netra in her next film Andhhagadu, pairing with her frequent co-star Raj Tarun. Her final release of the year was Angel with Naga Anvesh.

=== Career fluctuations (2018–present) ===
In 2018, her only film was 24 Kisses with Adith Arun. It saw her playing Sri Lakshmi and received mixed to positive reviews. Patel's setback started in 2019, when she had no release. In 2020, she portrayed a cameo character of Sarah in Bheeshma and supporting character of Srujana in Orey Bujjiga. Meanwhile, in 2020, she made her web debut with the Telugu series Masti's, portraying Tanya. In 2021, Hebah appeared in a special appearance in the song "Dinchak" along with Ram Pothineni in Red.

Following a career downturn, Hebah received praises for her performance as Radha in the 2022 film Odela Railway Station. Narendra Puppala of The Hans India stated that Patel "fits in effortlessly in her role". She has since gained reviews for her films, Geetha (2022), The Great Indian Suicide (2023), Ala Ninnu Cheri (2023), Honeymoon Express (2024) and Dhoom Dhaam (2024).

In 2025, Patel's first film was Vallan, which marked her comeback to Tamil films after 10 years. She played Priya, a model. Akshay Kumar of Cinema Express noted, "Hebah does a good job of keeping us engaged for a decent amount of the film."

== Filmography ==
=== Films ===
Key
†	Denotes films that have not yet been released

Year	Title	Role	Notes	Ref.
2014	Adyaksha	Aishwarya	Kannada film	
2014	Thirumanam Enum Nikkah	Naseema	Tamil film	
2014	Ala Ela	Shruti		
2015	Kumari 21F	Meena "Kumari"		
2016	Eedo Rakam Aado Rakam	Supriya		
2016	Ekkadiki Pothavu Chinnavada	Nithya / Amala		
2016	Naanna Nenu Naa Boyfriends	Padmavati "Paddu"		
2017	Mister	Meera		
2017	Andhhagadu	Dr. Netra		
2017	Angel	Nakshatra		
2018	24 Kisses	Sri Lakshmi		
2020	Bheeshma	Sarah	Cameo appearance	
2020	Orey Bujjiga	Srujana		
2021	Red	Herself	Special appearance in the song "Dinchak"	
2022	Odela Railway Station	Radha		
2022	Geetha	Geetha		
2022	Shasana Sabha	Dancer	Special appearance in a song "Nannu Pattukunte"	
2023	The Great Indian Suicide	Chaitra		
2023	Ala Ninnu Cheri	Anu		
2024	Vey Dharuvey	Herself	Special appearance in a song	
2024	Honeymoon Express	Sonali		
2024	Dhoom Dhaam	Suhana		
2025	Vallan	Priya	Tamil film	
2025	Odela 2	Radha		
2025	Thank You Dear	Priya		
2025	Mario	Hebah		
2025	Eesha	Naina		
2026	Repu Udayam 10 Gantalaku	Divya		
2026	Harudu	Soumya		
TBA	Aadya †	TBA	Tamil film; completed	
TBA	Rudra Kaala †	TBA	Kannada film; filming	

=== Television ===
Year	Title	Role	Network	Ref.
2020	Masti's	Tanya	Aha	
2023	Vyavastha	Yamini	ZEE5	

== Awards and nominations ==
Year	Award	Category	Work	Result	Ref.
2016	Santosham Film Awards	Best Debut Actress	Ala Ela & Kumari 21F	Won	
2016	Filmfare Awards South	Best Actress – Telugu	Kumari 21F	Nominated	
