= Pelli Pustakam =

Pelli Pustakam may refer to:

- Pelli Pustakam (1991 film), an Indian Telugu-language romantic comedy film
- Pelli Pustakam (2013 film), an Indian Telugu-language film

== See also ==
- Pustakam (disambiguation)
