= Ashtadigbandhanam =

Film was released theatrically on 22 September 2023

- Directed by: Baba PR
- Written by: Baba PR
- Produced by: Manoj Kumar Agarwal
- Starring: Surya Bharath Chandra; Vishika Kota; Manoj Kumar Agarwal; Viswender Reddy; Mahesh Ravul; Mani Patel; Ranjith Narayan Kurup; Naveen Kumar Gattu; Roshni Razzak
- Cinematography: Babu Kollabathula
- Edited by: Satya Giduturi
- Music by: Jackson Vijayan
- Production company: Makaka Film Production
- Release date: 22 September 2023
- Running time: 149 minutes
- Country: India
- Language: Telugu

Ashtadigbandhanam is a 2023 Indian Telugu language film directed by Baba PR and produced by Manoj Kumar Agarwal under Makaka Film Production. The main lead cast are Surya Bharath Chandra and Vishakha Kota. The score was composed by Jackson Vijayan and edited by Satya Giduturi. The film was released theatrically on 22 September 2023.

== Plot ==
MLA Sri Ramulu's (Viswender Reddy) devoted assistant is Shankar Goud, played by Mahesh Ravul. The MLA challenges Shankar to come up with 50 crores for the ticket in order to run in the future elections. In order to accomplish this, Shankar and his crew intend to rob a bank and enlist the aid of Gautham (Surya Bharath Chandra), who desperately needs money to pay for the medical care of his wife Priya (Vishika Kota).

== Cast ==
- Surya Bharath Chandra
- Vishika Kota
- Manoj Kumar Agarwal
- Viswender Reddy
- Mahesh Ravul
- Mani Patel
- Ranjith Narayan Kurup
- Naveen Kumar Gattu
- Roshni Razzak

== Soundtrack ==
Ashtadigbandhanam

Soundtrack album by Jackson Vijayan
- Released: 2023
- Recorded: 2022–2023
- Genre: Feature film soundtrack
- Language: Telugu
- Label: Aditya Music
- Producer: Jackson Vijayan

All music is composed by Jackson Vijayan.

Tracklist
No.	Title	Lyrics	Singer(s)	Length
1.	"I’m With You "	Baba PR	Prudvi Chandra; Manisha Eerabathini	3:26
2.	"Vintunnava"	Purna Chary	Saisharan; Spoorthi Yadagiri	4:43
3.	"Ashtadigbandhanam"	Purna Chary	Prudvi Chandra	4:31
Total length:				12

== Reception ==
A critic from Sakshi Post wrote Ashtadigbandhanam is a crime thriller that becomes a heist drama at one point
