= Spoorthi Yadagiri =

Indian playback singer

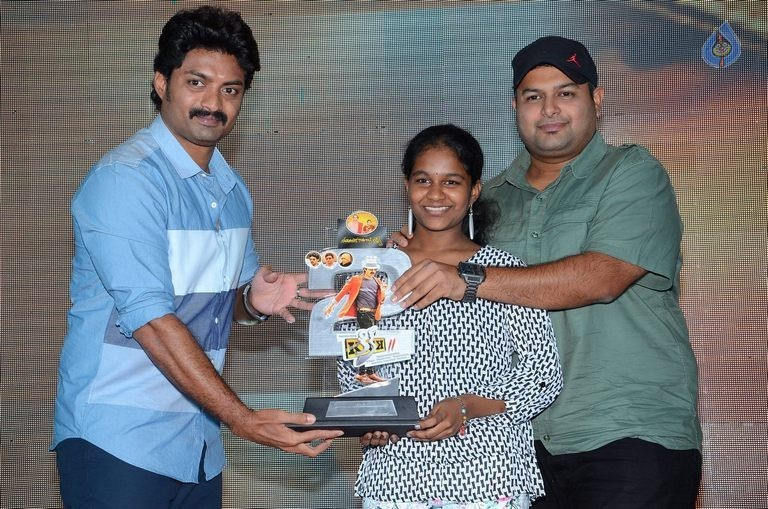
- Spoorthi receiving award for her Kukuru song in Kick 2
- Born: 25 March 2000; Ramakrishnapuram, Telangana
- Other name: Spoorthi Jithender
- Occupation: Playback singer
- Years active: 2011–present
- Parent(s): Jithender; Chaitanya
- Relatives: Jai Srinivas (uncle)

Spoorthi Yadagiri (also known as Spoorthi Jitender) is an Indian playback singer who works primarily in Telugu-language films.

== Career ==
At the age of three, Spoorthi would compose songs and write lyrics. She sang a song for the "Raja Rani" television serial and was paid ₹250. She made her film debut as a playback singer at the age of eleven with the film Yamaho Yama (2012) when she was eleven years old. She then went on to sing for Puri Jagannadh's Loafer (2015) and Ism (2016). She sang the title song of Kick 2 (2015) called "Kukkurukuru", which was an item song. She wrote the lyrics and sang the female version of the Telugu song "Pillaa Raa" from RX 100 (2018). Spoorthi sang the folk song "Dan Dana Dan". After the song's success, she sang more than eighty folk songs. She became famous for the song "Undipova" from Savaari (2020). She has since sung in seventy films.

== Personal life ==
She hails from Ramakrishnapuram, Telangana. She studied at Trinity College London. As of November 2021, she is pursuing a Bachelor of Science in distance education at Dr. B. R. Ambedkar University Delhi and has taught twenty-five children music since the lockdown. She writes and raps English songs and uploads them to her YouTube channel.

== Discography ==
Year	Song	Film	Composer	Co-singers
2012	"Talkiesu Talkiesu"	Yamaho Yama	Bhole Shavali	
2015	"Mazare Mazare"	Okkaditho Modalaindi	Bhole Shavali	
2015	"Nokkey Dochey"	Loafer	Sunil Kashyap	
2015	"Kukkurukuru"	Kick 2	Thaman S	
2015	"Appadam Appadam"	Sitara	Gantadi Krishna, Ram Paidisetty	
2015	"Chocolate Thinipisthanu"	Mee Kosam	Bhole Shavali	
2016	"Jyothi Lakshmi"	Nuvvu Evaro Nenu Evaro	Ramana Saake	
2016	"Cup Of Coffee Ok Na"	Chal Chal Gurram	Vengi	
2016	"Bhoom Shakalaka"	Banthi Poola Janaki	Bhole Shavali	
2016	"O Mama Ekkadunnav"	Marala Telupana Priya	Shekar Chandra	
2016	"Podaade Poda Poda	Ism	Anup Rubens	
2017	Bachche Kachche Sachche	Bachche Kachche Sachche	Ravishankar, Bhole Shavali	
2017	"Killer Verappan"	Accident	Vijay Balaji	
2017	"Sunny Leon"	Lacchi	Suresh Yuvan	
2017	"Sinnodu Peddodu"	Sarovaram	Sunil Kashyap	
2017	"Naughty Naughty"	127B (Dakhini)	Seshu K. M. R.	
2018	"Aggi Rajukundi Balle"	Desa Dhimmari	Subhash Anand	
2018	"Undipothara" (Female version)	Husharu	Radhan	
2019	"Uppu Karam"	Seenu Venu	Ravi Mulakalapalli	
2019	"Chalaaki Challa Challa"	Bullet	Subhash Anand	
2019	"Mashallah"	Krishna Rao Supermarket	Bhole Shavali	
2019	"Waka Waka Waka"	Special	N. V. S. Manyam	
2019	"Naa Kannulu Vethike"	Pranam Khareedu	Vandemataram Srinivas	
2019	"Mathuga Mathuga"	Planning	Bl Prasad	
2019	"Murari Murari"	Vajra Kavachadhara Govinda	Vijay Bulganin	
2019	"Undipova"	Savaari	Shekar Chandra	
2020	"Thantrika"	Nili Nilimisalodu	Naga Vamshi	
2020	"Daaham Theranantunnadi"	Blocked	Pradeep Chandra	
2020	"Guppedu Gundellona"	Vidyarthi	Vijay Bulganin	
2021	"Kathi Khatarnak Figurey Nenu"	Veyyi Shubhamulu Kalugu Neeku	Gynani Singh	
2021	"Superhitte"	Chitrapatam	Bandaru Danaiah Kavi	
2021	"Manalo Mata"	Cherasaala	Shankar Thamiri	
2021	"Scenu Scenu Siruguddhi"	Battala Ramaswamy Biopikku	Ram Narayan	
2021	"Dhammu"	Ammayi	Ravi Shanker, DSR	
2022	"Skin Tone Milk"	Kothala Rayudu	Sunil Kashyap	
2022	"I Miss You"	Case 30	Abu	
2022	"Chorkiyare"	Chor Bazaar	Suresh Bobbili	
2022	"Kumbhamela"	Manninchava	John Bhushan	
2022	"Ninna Daddy Nange"	Oh My Love (Kannada)	Charan Arjun	
2023	"Bapu Bomma"	Bhari Taraganam	Sukku	Yazin Nizar
2023	"Hey Madhumathi"	Jilebi	Mani Sharma	Dhanunjay Seepana, Simha
2024	"Honeymoon Express"	Honeymoon Express	Kalyani Malik	
2024	"Ori Mayaloda"	Uruku Patela	Pravin Lakkaraju	

=== Female versions and Independent Songs ===
Song	Album	Channel
"Pilloda" (Female version)	RX 100	Mango Music
"Yegire Yegire"	Madhanam	Aditya Music
"Oke Oka Lokam"	Sashi	Aditya Music
"Yaen Ennai Pirindhaai" (Tamil)	Aditya Varma	Aditya Music
"Anandamo"	Sindhooram	Aditya Music
"Zari Zari"	—	Nivriti Vibes
"Sitharangi"	—	Sunny Austin & Chinna Swamy
"Nerajana"	—	Sunny Austin & Chinna Swamy
"Love Mashup 2019"	—	Mango Music
"Nachadamma" (female version)	Geetha Govindam	Aditya Music
"Oo Maasi"	Gaali (TV series)	Madhura Audio
"Kisko Pata Hein"	Cab Stories (TV series)	Mango Music
"Badmash DJ"	Badmash Gallaki Bumper Offer Promotional song	Aditya Music
"Go Back 2020" - English rap version	—	Mittapalli Studio
"Yogila"	—	Matla Music
"Oh Cheli"	—	Baloo Spicy
"Sinukulata"	—	sytv
"Dan Dana Dan"	—	sytv
"Yadavunnavo Yennela Bava"	—	Siri Muvva Music
"Ungarala Juttoda"	—	RK Music
"Gunde Jallumannade Bava"	—	V Music
"Tiktok Tik"	Raja Rani	Star Maa - TV serial

== Awards and nomination ==
- Telugu Book of Records Achiever - Youngest Playback Singer
- Won - Best Upcoming Female Singer - Gama Awards (Dubai) for "Kukkurukuru" from Kick 2
- Won - Little Crazy Star of the Year 2015 award for "Kukkurukuru" from Kick 2
- 2021 - Nominated, SIIMA Award for Best Female Playback Singer for "Undipova" from Savaari
