= Pustakam =

Pustakam or Pusthakam (book in Sanskrit and other Indian languages) and may refer to:

- Prema Pustakam, a 1992 Indian Telugu-language romantic film
- Pelli Pustakam (1991 film), an Indian Telugu romantic comedy film
- Pelli Pustakam (2013 film), an Indian Telugu-language film

== See also ==
- Pelli Pustakam (disambiguation)
