= Oye Ninne =

- Theatrical release poster
- Directed by: Satyam Challakoti
- Produced by: Vamsi Krishna Srinivas
- Starring: Margani Bharat; Srushti Dange
- Edited by: Marthand K. Venkatesh
- Music by: Shekar Chandra
- Release date: 6 October 2017
- Running time: 118 minutes
- Country: India
- Language: Telugu

Oye Ninne (transl. Hey You) is a 2017 Indian Telugu-language romantic drama film directed by debutante Satyam Challakoti and starring newcomers Margani Bharat and Srushti Dange.

== Cast ==
- Margani Bharat as Vishnu
- Srushti Dange as Veda ("Ammulu")
- Nagineedu as Sekharam, Vishnu's father
- Tulasi as Vishnu's mother
- Raghu Babu as Veda's father
- Pragathi as Veda's mother
- Tanikella Bharani
- Satya as Vishnu's friend
- Thagubothu Ramesh as a drunkard
- Dhanraj as Arvind Swamy

== Production ==
Politician Margani Bharat landed the lead role after meeting Vamsi Krishna Srinivas at a beauty pageant, in which Bharat was one of the judges. Bharat shed eighteen kilograms to portray his role in the film. Tamil actress Srushti Dange made her lead Telugu debut with this film. The film was scheduled to release in October. The film's title Oye Ninne refers to the way in which the hero calls the heroine.

== Soundtrack ==
Oye Ninne

Soundtrack album by Shekar Chandra
- Released: 2017
- Recorded: 2017
- Genre: Soundtrack
- Length: 14:25
- Producer: Shekar Chandra

Shekar Chandra chronology
Andhhagadu (2017)	Oye Ninne (2017)	Howrah Bridge (2018)

The songs were composed by Shekar Chandra.

No.	Title	Lyrics	Singer(s)	Length
1.	"Manasa Manasa"		Anurag Kulkarni, Harini	3:37
2.	"Anukunnadhi Chestham"	Ramajogayya Sastry	Ramajogayya Sastry	3:08
3.	"Venkatesa"		Shekar Chandra	3:08
4.	"Etuvaipo"		Chaitra H. G.	4:32
Total length:				14:25

== Release ==
The Times of India gave the film a rating of two-and-a-half out of five stars and wrote that "Watch the movie if you’re in for a feel-good film that explores relationships on a relatable level and has beautifully rustic visuals". Telangana Today stated that "The film is narrated from the hero’s point of view and every time it takes a leap, the narration keeps the audience gripped". New Indian Express gave the film a rating of two out of five stars and wrote that "Oye Ninne is the recycled version of many old films that portrayed the bava-maradhalu romance for decades now". In addition to this, the movie faced criticism for normalizing, and even validating, rape and child abuse.
