= Malvika Nair =

Indian actress

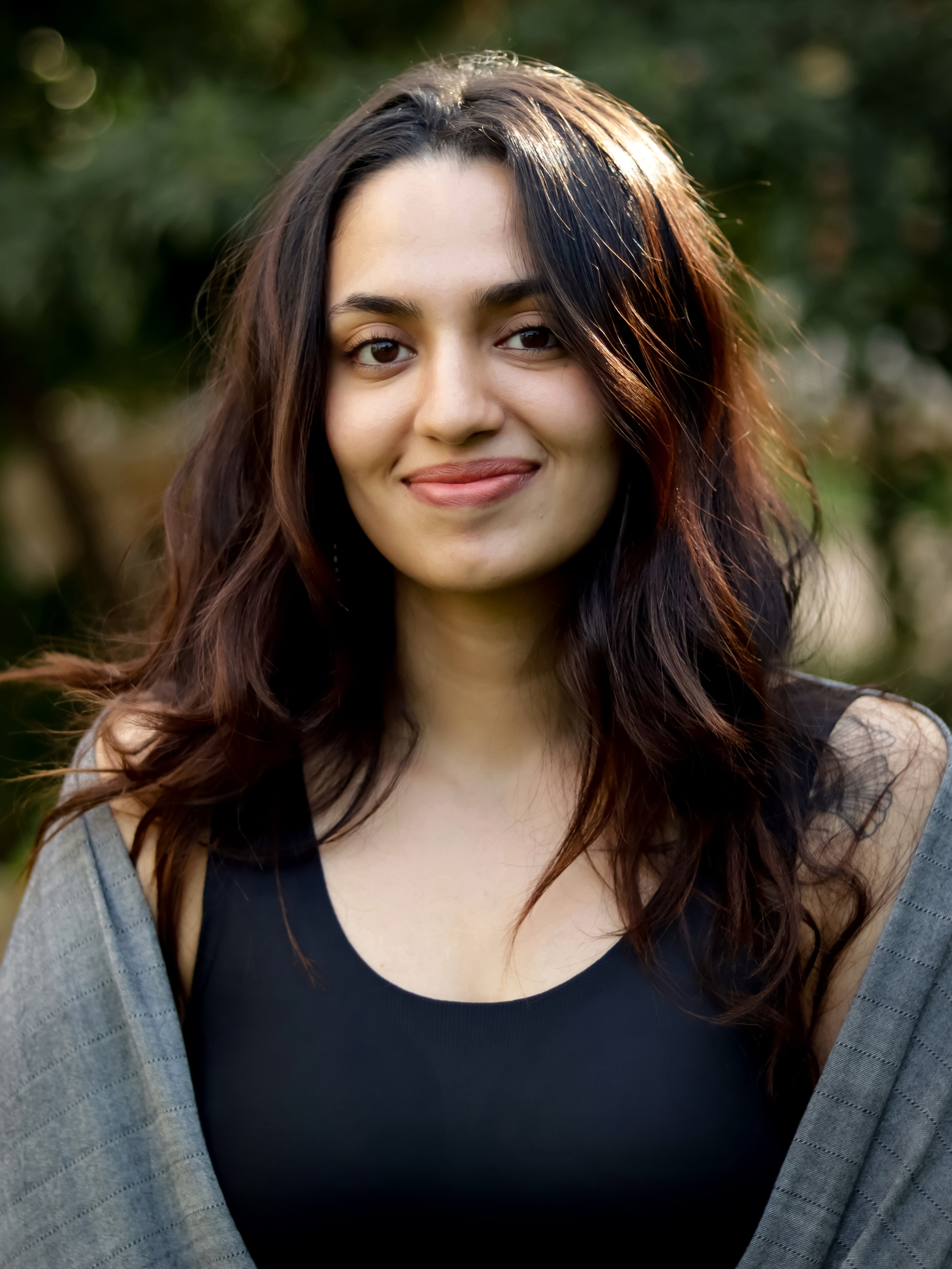
- Nair in 2021
- Born: Delhi, India
- Education: St Francis College for Women, Hyderabad (B.A Social Science); University of Edinburgh (M.S Philosophy)
- Occupation: Actress
- Years active: 2012–present

Malvika Nair is an Indian actress who mainly appears in Telugu and Malayalam films. Nair's notable works include Black Butterfly (2013), Cuckoo (2014), Yevade Subramanyam (2015), Taxiwaala (2018), Modern Love Hyderabad (2022) and Krishnam Pranaya Sakhi (2024).

== Early life and education ==
Malvika Nair was born in Delhi in a Malayali family. Her family soon moved to Kerala and she attended the Toc-H Public School in Vyttila, Kochi, before returning to New Delhi, where she continued her studies at DAV Sreshtha Vihar. She is a graduate from St Francis College for Women in Begumpet, Hyderabad. She has a master's degree in philosophy from University of Edinburgh.

== Career ==
While studying, Nair modelled, appearing in various advertisements as well as the Mohan Sithara-directed music video, "Rithukkal". She subsequently began to receive acting offers and eventually entered the film industry at age 13. In her first few films she had minor supporting or cameo roles; in Ustad Hotel, she made a brief appearance in a song sequence, while in Puthiya Theerangal and Karmayodha she played the daughter of Nedumudi Venu and Mohanlal's characters, respectively. Her first major role was as Reena, a house maid who faces an acid attack, in the Malayalam drama film Black Butterfly (2013), a remake of Vazhakku Enn 18/9.

After watching her performance in Black Butterfly, Balaji Sakthivel, director of its original version, was impressed and recommended aspiring director Raju Murugan to cast her in his romantic drama film Cuckoo (2014). She portrayed an independent blind girl in the film and prior to the shoot, attended a workshop where she interacted with blind people. Pairing alongside Dinesh, Malavika portrayed Sudhanthirakodi and won critical acclaim for her portrayal. Behindwoods noted her as "effectuated excellence", while Sify.com's review stated she was "superb" and that she "lives the role". Her performance was subsequently rewarded with the Filmfare Award for Best Actress, Vijay Award for Best Debut Actress as well as the SICA Award for Best Newcomer and the Vikatan Award for Best Actress. Prior to Cuckoo, she had a Malayalam release, Pakida, in which she portrayed a fifteen-year-old girl who is sold to a brothel by her own father.

Nair next appeared in the Telugu film Yevade Subramanyam (2015) alongside Nani, with a critic noting she "shows a lot of spunk and comes up with a matured performance for a newcomer". Malavika's next release was the romantic drama, Kalyana Vaibhogame (2016), opposite Naga Shaurya. It was directed by B. V. Nandini Reddy and the film was praised and her role was well appreciated. Sify wrote that "Malavika Nair who wowed the audiences with her performance in Yevade Subramanyam shines again as modern independent minded girl. She steals the show in many scenes".

In 2018, she starred as Alamelu Gemini Ganeshan in the Savitri biopic, Mahanati, directed by Nag Ashwin, which was successful at the box-office ran of 100 days.

In 2020, she starred in Orey Bujjiga opposite Raj Tarun which was later directly released on Aha due to COVID-19 pandemic.

== Filmography ==
Key
†	Denotes films that have not yet been released

=== Films ===
Year	Title	Role(s)	Language	Notes	Ref.
2012	Ustad Hotel	Brief appearance in a song sequence	Malayalam		
2012	Karmayodha	Diya	Malayalam	Credited as Malavya	
2012	Puthiya Theerangal	Minikkutty	Malayalam	Credited as Malavika Sai	
2013	Black Butterfly	Reena	Malayalam	Credited as Malavika Sai	
2014	Pakida	Kani	Malayalam		
2014	Cuckoo	Sudhanthirakodi	Tamil		
2015	Yevade Subramanyam	Anandhi	Telugu		
2016	Kalyana Vaibhogame	Divya	Telugu		
2018	Mahanati	Alamelu Gemini Ganesan	Telugu		
2018	Vijetha	Chaithra	Telugu		
2018	Taxiwaala	Sisira Bharadwaj	Telugu		
2019	Ninu Veedani Needanu Nene	Psychology student	Telugu	Cameo appearance	
2020	Orey Bujjiga	Krishnaveni	Telugu		
2022	Thank You	Parvati "Paaru"	Telugu		
2023	Phalana Abbayi Phalana Ammayi	Anupama Kasturi	Telugu		
2023	Anni Manchi Sakunamule	Aryani	Telugu		
2023	Devil: The British Secret Agent	Manimekala	Telugu		
2024	Kalki 2898 AD	Uttara	Telugu	Cameo appearance	
2024	Krishnam Pranaya Sakhi	Pranaya	Kannada		
2026	Biker	Ananya	Telugu		
2026	Mahendragiri Varahi		Telugu		

=== Television ===
Year	Title	Role	Network	Notes
2022	Modern Love Hyderabad	Vandana Bharadwaj	Amazon Prime Video	Segment: "What Clown Wrote this Script?"

== Awards and nominations ==
Malavika Nair awards and nominations
Awards and nominations
Award	Wins	Nominations

Totals (Note: Certain award groups do not simply award one winner. They acknowledge several different recipients, have runners-up, and have third place. Since this is a specific recognition and is different from losing an award, runner-up mentions are considered wins in this award tally. For simplification and to avoid errors, each award in this list has been presumed to have had a prior nomination.)
- Wins: 3
- Nominations: 3

Year	Award	Category	Work	Result	Ref.
2015	Vijay Awards	Best Debut Actress	Cuckoo	Won	
2015	Filmfare Awards South	Best Actress – Tamil	Cuckoo	Won	
2015	Ananda Vikatan Cinema Awards	Best Actress	Cuckoo	Won	
2015	South Indian International Movie Awards	Best Debut Actress – Tamil	Cuckoo	Nominated	
2016	South Indian International Movie Awards	Best Female Debut – Telugu	Yevade Subramanyam	Nominated	
2019	Filmfare Awards South	Best Supporting Actress – Telugu	Taxiwaala	Nominated	
