= Jai Srinivas =

Indian playback singer (died 2021)

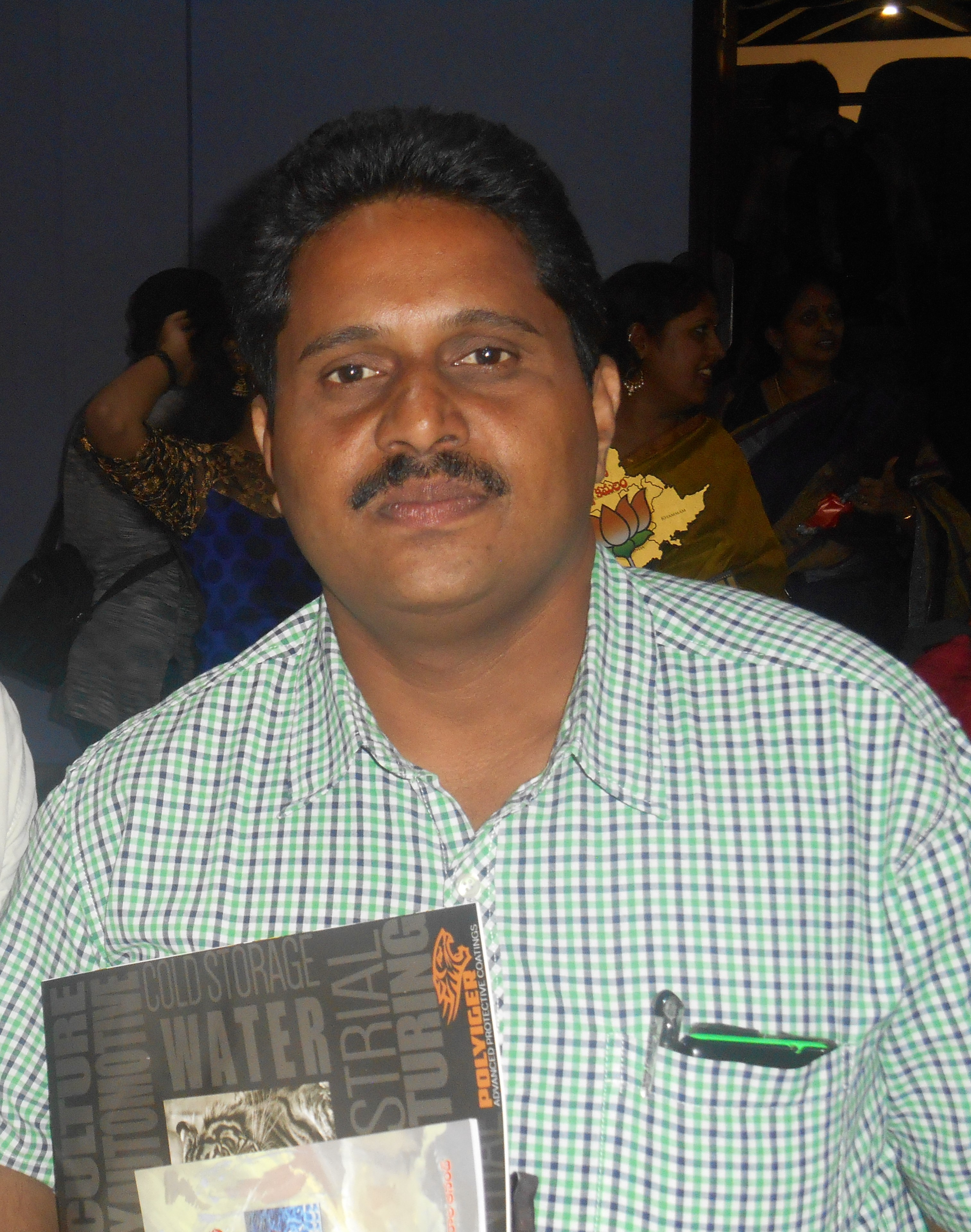
- Born: Neredikomma Srinivas; Mandamarri, Manchiryal, Telangana, India
- Died: 21 May 2021; Hyderabad
- Known for: Playback singer
- Spouse: Swathi
- Children: 2 daughters
- Relatives: Spoorthi Yadagiri (nephew)

Neredukomma Srinivas, also known as Jai Srinivas, was a playback singer from the Telugu film industry. He has sung Telugu devotional songs.

== Early life ==
Neredukomma Srinivas was born in Mandamarri village Manchiryal district of Telangana. He did his early schooling from Singareni high school at Mandamarri in 1993.

== Discography ==
Year	Movie name	Name of the song	Music director
2002	Mee Kosam	"O Lali O Lali"	Mahati
2004	Jai	"Desam Manade Tejam Manade"	Anup Rubens
2005	Alajadi	"Cepa Kalla Papa"	Chandragirimaharaja
2006	Veedhi	"Na Citti Talli"	Anup Rubens
2008	Gunde Jhallumandi	"Pavada Kasta"	M. M. Keeravani
2008	Kurkure	"Varevva Varevva"	Rajeswari
2008	Yekkadunnavamma Oo Premika	"Na Gumde Mida", "Ekkadunnavamma"	Rajkiran
2009	Sasirekha Parinayam	"Gundello Golisoda"	Mani Sharma
2009	Naa Style Veru	"Kottu Kottu"	Anup Rubens
2010	Comedy Express	"Ka Ka Ka Kamedi", "Nuvvumte Nitya", "Amma Nanna"	Sam Dicasto
2010	Premistava	"Pomge Godarivo"	Manu Ramesan
2010	Andari Bandhuvaya	"Suryudu Evarayya"	Anup Rubens
2010	Cheta Venna Mudda	"Nija July Telisi", "Eti Odduna", "Aṃdalapudota"	Raviswaroopan
2013	Ongole Gittha	"Mama Maraju"	G. V. Prakash Kumar
2014	Raja Rani (D)	"Hey Baby"	G. V. Prakash Kumar
2015	Janda Pai Kapiraju	"Don't Worry Be Happy"	G. V. Prakash Kumar
2015	Trisha Leda Nayanthara (D)	"Kanthiri Pilla"	G. V. Prakash Kumar
2016	Police (D)	"Jithula Jilladi"	G. V. Prakash Kumar
2020	Pizza 2 (D)	"Taguve Taguve"	Sam C. S.
2022	Oo Abhimani Katha	"Naa Bujji Bangaram"	Jaya Surya Bompem

== Death ==
Srinivas died on 21 May 2021, from COVID-19 complications at a private hospital in Secunderabad.
