= Pakida =

- Theatrical release poster
- Directed by: Sunil Karyattukara
- Written by: Rajesh Rajendran; Sreejith N.
- Produced by: Sagar Shereef; Kartha Seagulf
- Starring: Asif Ali; Biju Menon; Malavika Nair
- Cinematography: Sameer Haq
- Edited by: Manoj
- Music by: Bijibal
- Production companies: Sagar & Seagulf Productions
- Distributed by: Sagar Cinema Release
- Release date: 14 February 2014
- Country: India
- Language: Malayalam

Pakida (transl. Dice) is a 2014 Indian Malayalam-language road movie directed by Sunil Karyattukara, written by Rajesh Rajendran and Sreejith N., and starring Asif Ali and Biju Menon with Malavika Nair, Shine Tom Chacko, Aju Varghese, Vishnu G Raghav, and Anjo Jose in supporting roles. The film was released on 14 February 2014.

== Plot ==
Five friends - Aadhi, Rafeeq, C. P., Pauly, and Balu - are graduates in automobile engineering and are close to each other. Aadhi has a love affair. He meets a middle-aged man, George Koshy Anthrapper, who walks with the help of a walking stick. Aadhi accompanies Anthrapper on a journey to Rameswaram. They come across Sunny and a Tamil girl, Kani.

== Cast ==
- Asif Ali as Aadhi
- Biju Menon as George Koshy Anthraper
- Shine Tom Chacko as Sunny
- Malavika Nair as Kani
- Aju Varghese as Maathan
- Vishnu G Raghav as Rafik
- Anjo Jose
- Sajid Yahiya as Sherif
- Apoorva Bose as Pooja
- Renji Panicker Sreekumar
- P. Balachandran as Adhi's father
- Balaji Sarma as Xaiver
- Assim Jamal as Stephen

== Production ==
Pakida is the second movie of Sunil Karyattukara after Chacko Randaaman. Filming was carried in Tamil Nadu and Kochi, Kerala.

== Soundtrack ==
The music was composed by Bijibal with lyrics by Rafeeq Ahamed, Jophy Tharakan, and Nillai Jayanthi.

Track	Title	Singer(s)	Length
1	"Aaranaara"	Najim Arshad, Vinod Menon	3:56
2	"Ee Poo Veyilil"	Soumya T. R.	3:12
3	"Item Song"	Anuradha Sriram	

== Release ==
The film was released in theatres on 14 February 2014.
