= Honeymoon Express (2024 film) =

- Theatrical release poster
- Directed by: Bala Rajasekharuni
- Written by: Bala Rajasekharuni
- Produced by: Bala Rajasekharuni
- Starring: Chaitanya Rao Madadi; Hebah Patel
- Cinematography: Sistla Vmk
- Edited by: Umashankar Gummadidala
- Music by: Score; R. P. Patnaik; Songs; Kalyani Malik
- Production companies: New Reel India Entertainments; NRI Entertainments
- Release date: 21 June 2024
- Running time: 119 minutes
- Country: India
- Language: Telugu

Honeymoon Express is a 2024 Indian Telugu-language comedy drama film written, directed and produced by Bala Rajasekharuni. The film features Chaitanya Rao Madadi and Hebah Patel with Tanikella Bharani and Suhasini Maniratnam in supporting roles. The film was released on 21 June 2024.

== Plot ==
Eshan and Sonali have been married for a year, but they are close to filing for divorce. They must make a difficult decision shortly before their first anniversary: do they "cut the cake" or "cut the relationship"? They meet a peculiar elderly couple by strange accident, and their intervention alters their lives forever. To save their marriage, the seniors send them to a mysterious location known as the "Honeymoon Express." But what seems like paradise quickly turns into a bizarre nightmare that puts their relationship to the ultimate test by exposing their deepest fears, secrets, and wants. Will they make it through this hardship together and head back home, or will they be apart for good? Their epic trip culminates in this question, which keeps the audience on the edge of their seats.

== Cast ==
- Chaitanya Rao Madadi as Eeshan
- Hebah Patel as Sonali
- Tanikella Bharani as Bala
- Suhasini Maniratnam as Tripura Sundari
- Ali as Dr. Bhangima Bhaskar
- Arvind Krishna as Rahul
- Surekha Vani as Ragini
- Ravi Varma as Vineeth Sharma

== Music ==
Honeymoon Express

Soundtrack album by Kalyani Malik
- Released: 2024
- Recorded: 2023–2024
- Genre: Feature film soundtrack
- Language: Telugu
- Label: T-series
- Producer: Kalyani Malik

Kalyani Malik chronology
Vidya Vasula Aham (2024)	Honeymoon Express (2024)

The film's soundtrack album is Kalyani Malik, whereas background score is composed by R. P. Patnaik.

All music is composed by Kalyani Malik.

Tracklist
No.	Title	Lyrics	Singer(s)	Length
1.	"Prema"	Kittu Vissapragada	Anurag Kulkarni	4:05
2.	"Cute Gaa Sweetu Gaa"	Kittu Vissapragada	Deepu	4.55
3.	"Nijama"	Kittu Vissapragada	Sunitha, Kalyani Malik	3:37
4.	"Honeymoon Express"	Kittu Vissapragada, Spoorthi Jithender	Spoorthi Jithender	3:12
Total length:				15:09

== Release and reception ==
Honeymoon Express was released on 21 June 2024.

Sasidhar Adivi of Times Now gave a rating of 2.5 out of 5 stated "it has some engaging moments but is frivolous at the same time", while praising performances of Chaitanya and Hebah.
