= Bhuvana Vijayam (film) =

- Theatrical release poster
- Directed by: Yalamanda Charan
- Screenplay by: Yalamanda Charan
- Produced by: P. Uday Kiran; V. Srikanth
- Starring: Sunil; Vasanthi Krishnan; Vennela Kishore; Srinivasa Reddy; Prudhvi
- Cinematography: Sai
- Edited by: Chota K. Prasad
- Music by: Shekar Chandra
- Production companies: Himalaya Studio Mansions; Mirth Media
- Release date: 12 May 2023
- Running time: 118 minutes
- Country: India
- Language: Telugu

Bhuvana Vijayam is a 2023 Indian Telugu-language comedy thriller film written and directed by Yalamanda Charan in his directorial debut, while it was produced by P. Uday Kiran and V. Drikanth under Himalaya Studio Mansions and Mirth Media Banners. The film features Sunil, Srinivasa Reddy, Viva Harsha, Vasanthi, Prudhvi, Dhanraj in the main lead roles along with Jabardasth Raghava, Goparaju Ramana, Sonia Chowdary in supporting roles. The music was composed by Shekar Chandra.

== Cast ==
- Sunil as "Feelings Star" Preetham Kumar
- Vasanthi Krishnan
- Vennela Kishore as Mute writer
- Srinivasa Reddy as Elder writer’s assistant
- Prudhvi as Elder writer
- Goparaju Ramana as Chalapathi
- Dhanraj as Yadagiri
- Viva Harsha as Thief writer
- Raj Tirandasu
- Jabardast Raghava
- Anant
- Sonia Chowdary
- Snehal Kamat
- Shaking Seshu
- Sathi Pandu

== Release ==
Bhuvana Vijayam was released on 12 May 2023. Upon release, the film received mixed reviews from critics.
