= Andhhagadu =

- Theatrical release poster
- Directed by: Veligonda Srinivas
- Written by: B. Bhanu Kiran; Nandu R. K. (dialogues)
- Screenplay by: Veligonda Srinivas
- Story by: Veligonda Srinivas
- Produced by: Sunkara Ramabrahmam
- Starring: Raj Tarun; Hebah Patel; Rajendra Prasad
- Cinematography: B. Rajasekar
- Edited by: M. R. Varma
- Music by: Shekar Chandra
- Production company: AK Entertainments Pvt Ltd
- Release date: 2 June 2017
- Running time: 132 mins
- Country: India
- Language: Telugu

Andhhagadu (transl. Blind Handsome Man) is a 2017 Telugu-language comedy thriller film, produced by Sunkara Ramabrahmam on AK Entertainments Pvt Ltd banner and directed by Veligonda Srinivas. The film stars Raj Tarun, Hebah Patel and Rajendra Prasad in the lead roles, while Ashish Vidyarthi, Sayaji Shinde, and Raja Ravindra play supporting roles. The music is composed by Shekar Chandra. This movie was declared a hit at the box office. It was remade in Odia as Sriman Surdas.

== Cast ==
- Raj Tarun as Gautham
- Hebah Patel as Dr. Netra
- Rajendra Prasad as Ranjith Kulkarni
- Ashish Vidyarthi as Dr. Ashish
- Suhasini Maniratnam as Meenakshi Iyer, Gautham's mother
- Pramodini Pammi as Annapurna, Netra's mother
- Sayaji Shinde as ACP Dharma, Netra's father
- Raja Ravindra as Pantham Babji
- Satya as Kishore
- Brahmanandam as Satyanarayana
- Satyam Rajesh as Rajesh
- Jaya Prakash Reddy as Lawyer
- Paruchuri Venkateswara Rao as Venkatachalam
- Chandra Mohan as Chandram, Gautham's father
- Fish Venkat as Babji's henchmen
- Prabhakar
- Ananth
- Ratnasagar as Netra's grandmother

== Soundtrack ==
Andhhagadu

Film score by Shekar Chandra
- Released: May 25, 2017
- Recorded: 2017
- Genre: Soundtrack
- Length: 15:47
- Label: Aditya Music
- Producer: Shekar Chandra

Shekar Chandra chronology
Nanna Nenu Naa Boyfriends (2016)	Andhhagadu (2017)	Oye Ninne (2017)

Music composed by Shekar Chandra. Music released on ADITYA Music Company.

No.	Title	Lyrics	Singer(s)	Length
1.	"Debbaki Poye Poye"	Bhaskarabhatla	Dhanunjay, Shekar Chandra	3:31
2.	"Jagame Maaya"	Ramajogayya Sastry	Siddarth Watkins	3:26
3.	"Andhagaadu Aata Kochade"	Ramajogayya Sastry	Simha, Geetha Madhuri	3:13
4.	"Premika"	Ramajogayya Sastry	Manisha Eerabathini, Megha Sravanthi	3:28
5.	"Kanula Mundhare"	Karunakar Adigarla	Venky	2:09
Total length:				15:47

== Reception ==
A critic from The Hindu wrote that "At the end of Andhhagadu you might wonder what was it that the makers set out to do. It's a revenge drama cloaked as a comedy".
