= Stand Up Rahul =

2022 Indian Telugu- language film by Santo

- Theatrical release poster
- Directed by: Santo
- Written by: Santo
- Produced by: Nandkumar Abbineni; Bharath Maguluri
- Starring: Raj Tarun; Varsha Bollamma
- Cinematography: Sreeraj Raveendran
- Edited by: Ravi Teja Girijala
- Music by: Sweekar Agasthi
- Production companies: Dream Town Productions; Highfive Pictures
- Release date: 18 March 2022
- Country: India
- Language: Telugu

Stand Up Rahul is a 2022 Indian Telugu-language coming of age romantic comedy film directed by debutant Santo.The film is produced jointly by Nandkumar Abbineni and Bharath Maguluri. The film stars Raj Tarun and Varsha Bollamma. The music is composed by Sweekar Agasthi. The film was released on 18 March 2022 coinciding with Holi festival.

== Cast ==
- Raj Tarun as Rahul
- Varsha Bollamma as Sreya Rao
- Murali Sharma as Prakash, Rahul's father
- Indraja as Indu, Rahul's mother
- Vennela Kishore as Steve Jags
- Venkatesh Maha as Hriday
- Devi Prasad as Sreya's father
- Rajkumar Kasireddy as Rahul's friend

== Production ==
Stand up Rahul began filming after the extended lockdown in 2020.

== Reception ==
Neeshita Nyayapati of The Times of India gave the film a rating of 2.5/5 and wrote "Stand Up Rahul is the kind of film you want to watch over a large tub of popcorn and while it might be flawed, it also works in bits and pieces. Watch it if breezy rom-coms are your thing". A reviewer from The Hans India gave the film a rating of 2/5 and wrote "As a final note, “Stand Up Rahul is a youthful drama that has a few good moments to enjoy but lack of gripping scene order and abruptly written characterizations make the film a disappointing watch". Sangeetha Devi Dundoo of The Hindu stated "What could have been a refreshing coming-of-age romantic comedy gets marred by clumsy writing".
