= Vallan (film) =

2025 film by VR Mani Seiyon

- Theatrical release poster
- Directed by: VR Mani Seiyon
- Written by: VR Mani Seiyon
- Dialogues by: VR Mani Seiyon; Aravindh Sachidanandam
- Produced by: VR Manikandaraman; V Gayathri
- Starring: Sundar C; Tanya Hope; Hebah Patel
- Cinematography: Mani Perumal
- Edited by: Dinesh Ponraj
- Music by: Santhosh Dhayanidhi
- Production company: VR Della Film Factory
- Release date: 24 January 2025
- Running time: 122 minutes
- Country: India
- Language: Tamil

Vallan is a 2025 Indian Tamil-language action crime thriller film written and directed by VR Mani Seiyon starring Sundar C, Tanya Hope and Hebah Patel alongside Kamal Kamaraju, Abhirami Venkatachalam, Chandini Tamilarasan, Thalaivasal Vijay, Jayakumar, TSK and others in supporting roles. The film is produced by VR Manikandaraman and V Gayathri under VR Della Film Factory banner.

Vallan released in theatres on 24 January 2025 to mixed to positive reviews from critics.

== Plot ==
A rich businessman, Joel, is murdered in his apartment mysteriously. ACP Divakar Pandian is assigned to investigate the case, during his investigation he finds so many loopholes and suspects that influential people are involved here. With the help of Priya an actress, he decides to find the culprit.

== Cast ==
- Sundar C as Inspector Divakar
- Tanya Hope as Aadhya (Voice dubbed by Smruthi K)
- Hebah Patel as Priya
- Kamal Kamaraju as Joel
- Jayakumar as Arokiyaraj & Inbaraj
- Abhirami Venkatachalam as Anitha
- Chandini Tamilarasan as Kalyani
- Thalaivasal Vijay as Minister
- Ravi Venkatraman
- Aruvi Madankumar as James
- TSK as Constable Ravi
- Aroul D. Shankar as Ramesh

== Production ==
After Iruttu (2019), Sundar C was announced to portray a role of a police officer in his next film by Kattappava Kanom (2017) fame director VR Mani Seiyon. On 7 February, the title of the thriller film to be Vallan was revealed through a teaser. The film is produced by VR Manikandaraman and V Gayathri under VR Della Film Factory banner and the technical team consists of cinematographer Mani Perumal, editor Dinesh Ponraj, art director Sakthee Venkatraj and music composer Santhosh Dhayanidhi.

== Music ==
Vallan

Soundtrack album by Santhosh Dhayanidhi
- Genre: Feature film soundtrack
- Language: Tamil
- Producer: Santhosh Dhayanidhi

Santhosh Dhayanidhi chronology
Partner (2023)	Vallan (2025)

Singles from Vallan
- 1. "Kanjaadai Poova" Released: 4 January 2025

The film has music composed by Santhosh Dhayanidhi. The first single "Kanjaadai Poova" released on 4 January 2025.

Track listing
No.	Title	Lyrics	Singer(s)	Length
1.	"Kanjaadai Poova"	Umadevi	Karthik, Rakshita Suresh	3:46

== Release ==
Vallan released in theatres on 24 January 2025.

== Critical reception ==
A critic of Dinamalar gave 2.5/5 stars, appreciating the climax twist while criticizing the usual screenplay and performance of Sundar C. Akshay Kumar of Cinema Express gave 2.5/5 stars and wrote "Vallan is a watchable cop procedural, but it could have been significantly better with a more refined approach to writing and direction." Abhinav Subramanian of The Times of India gave 2/5 stars and wrote "Vallan mistakes narrative density for depth, ending up as a thriller that’s more exhausting than thrilling. It’s the kind of film that makes us wish someone had murdered the plot instead."
