= 24 Kisses =

- Indian release poster
- Directed by: Ayodhyakumar Krishnamsetty
- Written by: Ayodhyakumar Krishnamsetty; Harishankar Tamminana
- Produced by: Ayodhyakumar Krishnamsetty; Giridhar Mamidipally
- Starring: Adith Arun; Hebah Patel; Rao Ramesh; Naresh; Ravi Varma
- Cinematography: Uday Gurrala
- Edited by: Anil Aalayam
- Music by: Joi Barua
- Production companies: Respect Creations; Silly Monks Entertainment
- Release dates: 23 November 2018 (India, United States)
- Running time: 140 minutes
- Country: India
- Language: Telugu

24 Kisses is a 2018 Indian Telugu language romantic comedy-drama film about modern age relationships and the transformation of the lead characters. It was directed by Ayodhyakumar Krishnamsetty, and starring Adith Arun, Hebah Patel, Rao Ramesh, Naresh and Ravi Varma. The film was written by Krishnamsetty along with Harishankar Tamminana. It was co-produced by Krishnamsetty and Giridhar Mamidipally.

The film's cinematography was by Uday Gurrala and editing by Anil Aalayam. It was released under the banner, Silly Monks Entertainments on 23 November in 2018. It appears to be an autobiographical reference to the incidents in the director's life.

== Plot ==
Filmmaker Anand (Adith Arun) is not interested in the institution of marriage. He doesn't want to get married anytime soon, though he had several affairs. Once he gets into a relationship with Sri Lakshmi (Hebah Patel) as well. Lakshmi falls in love with Anand. Upon learning of his ideology in the institution of marriage, she breaks up with him. Rest of the story deals with whether Anand changes his opinion to win back his love.

== Cast ==
- Adith Arun as Anand
- Hebah Patel as Sri Lakshmi
- Rao Ramesh as psychiatrist Murthy
- Naresh as Sri Lakshmi's father
- Ravi Varma
- Aditi Myakal as Vishwa
- Kishore Gundala as Sudheer
- Srinivasa Kapavarapu as Praveen
- Sanjay Reddy as an angel investor

== Soundtracks ==
24 Kisses Original Motion Picture Soundtrack

Soundtrack album by: Kavya Kumar; P V N S Rohit; Vibah Saraf; Saandip; Sri Krishna
- Released: 21 October 2018
- Studio: Silly Monks Entertainment Ltd
- Label: Silly Monks Entertainment Ltd

All lyrics are written by Ramajogayya Sastry; all music is composed by Joi Barua.

Original Motion Picture Soundtrack
No.	Title	Singer(s)	Length
1.	"Praana Brundhavanam"	Kavya Kumar, P V N S Rohit	4:24
2.	"Jaago Jaago"	Joi Barua	4:25
3.	"Ee Samayam Naa Hrudhayam"	P V N S Rohit	4:39
4.	"Aksharaalu Lene Leni" (Female version)	Vibah Saraf	4:40
5.	"Chitapata Jallula"	Saandip	4:55
6.	"Sorry Sorry"	Sri Krishna	4:46
7.	"Sri Lakshmi Raave"	P V N S Rohit	3:47
8.	"Aksharaalu Lene Leni" (Male version)	Saandip	4:46
9.	"24 Kisses" (Theme song)	Vibah Saraf	4:40
