= Ala Ela =

- Theatrical release poster
- Directed by: Aneesh R. Krishna
- Produced by: Ashok Vardhan
- Starring: Rahul Ravindran; Hebah Patel; Bhanu Sri Mehra; Kushi; Vennela Kishore; Shani Salmon
- Cinematography: Sai Sriram
- Music by: Bheems Ceciroleo
- Production company: Ashoka Creations
- Release date: 28 November 2014
- Country: India
- Language: Telugu

Ala Ela (transl. How so?) is a 2014 Indian Telugu-language film directed by Anish R. Krishna and produced by Ashok Vardhan. The film stars Rahul Ravindran, Hebah Patel, Kushi, Bhanu Sri Mehra, Vennela Kishore, and Shani Salmon. The music was composed by Bheems Ceciroleo with cinematography by Sai Sri Ram. The film was released on 28 November 2014.

== Plot ==
Karthik (Rahul Ravindran) is forced to fulfill the last wish of his grandfather: marry a village girl named Divya (Kushi). Karthik wants to get introduced to her in anonymity and then fall in love before getting married. He gathers his funky friends - a victim of wife (Vennela Kishore) and a guy (Shani Salmon) who thinks he is creative. After going to the village, Karthik meets Shruti (Hebah Patel) and then Divya. The rest of the story is all about what happens when Karthik realises that he has feelings for Shruti instead of Divya.

== Cast ==
- Rahul Ravindran as Karthik
- Hebah Patel as Shruti (Voice dubbed by Chinmayi Sripada)
- Kushi as Divya
- Bhanu Sri Mehra
- Vennela Kishore
- Shani Salmon
- Kondavalasa
- Krishna Bhagawan
- Ravi Varma
- C. V. L. Narasimha Rao

== Soundtrack ==
The soundtrack of the film was composed by Bheems Ceciroleo. The soundtrack album was released on 29 July 2014 at 7 Acres, Annapurna Studios Hyderabad and its consists of six songs. Lyrics for the songs were written by Sirivennela Seetharama Sastry, Vanamali and Bheems Ceciroleo.

Ala Ela

Soundtrack album by Bheems Ceciroleo
- Released: 29 July 2014
- Recorded: 2014
- Genre: Film soundtrack
- Length: 22:34
- Label: Ashoka Music
- Producer: Bheems Ceciroleo

Bheems Ceciroleo chronology
Joru (2014)	Ala Ela (2014)	Bengal Tiger (2015)

Track listing
No.	Title	Singer(s)	Length
1.	"No No Mistake"	Ranjith	3:57
2.	"Prati Chinukulo"	Pranavi	3:38
3.	"Osho"	Harish Raghavendra	4:39
4.	"Edutakaladu"	Sooraj	3:42
5.	"Dhanak Dhanak"	Neha Kakkar	2:27
6.	"Enduke"	Sooraj	4:11
Total length:			22:34

== Reception ==
Jeevi of Idlebrain rated the film 3/5 and wrote, "Plus points are fresh taking, fun moments and male leads. On the flipside, second half is sluggish. [...] On a whole, Ala Ela is a kind of film which falls short of being a good film, but makes an okay watch!" Hemanth Kumar of The Times of India rated the film 3/5 stars and wrote, "There’s so much to like about the film, especially the sharp writing, bromance, pleasant music. And it makes you question if the film could have been much more than what it aims for, but there’s no denying that it strikes the right chords for most part." Sangeetha Devi Dundoo of The Hindu wrote, "What this film lacks is pace and requires some patience. Watch this film for some laugh aloud moments."
