= The Great Indian Suicide =

- Promotional release poster
- Directed by: Viplove Koneti
- Written by: Viplove Koneti
- Produced by: Viplove Koneti
- Starring: Hebah Patel
- Cinematography: Ananth Nag; Ajay Nag
- Edited by: Dharmendra Kakarala
- Music by: Sricharan Pakala
- Production companies: Syringe Cinema; KSV Presents
- Distributed by: aha
- Release date: 6 October 2023
- Country: India
- Language: Telugu

The Great Indian Suicide also known as Telisinavaallu (transl. The people you know) is a 2023 Indian Telugu-language thriller film directed by Viplove Koneti and starring Hebah Patel. The film is based on a double suicide that happened in Madanapalle and is inspired by the Burari deaths. The film was released on 6 October 2023 on aha.

== Plot ==
Chaitra is a young woman from a deeply superstitious family. Her family believes in extreme rituals and prepares for a cult-like mass suicide, convinced it will bring spiritual salvation. Chaitra is trapped between her family’s blind faith and her own will.

At that point, Hemanth — a man who loves her — enters the picture and tries to save her. As he digs deeper, he uncovers disturbing truths about the family’s beliefs and the manipulative forces behind them. The story turns into a psychological thriller, exposing how superstition, trauma, and manipulation can push people toward tragedy. The climax reveals unexpected twists about the real motive behind the planned suicides.

== Cast ==
- Hebah Patel as Chaitra
- Ram Karthik as Hemanth
- Naresh as Ballari Neelakantam
- Pavitra Lokesh
- Rathna Shekar Reddy as Nirmal Maharaj
- Jayaprakash
- Deborah Doris
- Lakshmi Narayana

== Production ==
The film underwent production under the working title Telisinavaallu.

== Reception ==
A critic from Deccan Chronicle wrote that ""The Great Indian Suicide" offers an intriguing concept that is worth exploring. Hebah Patel's performance and the surprising twists in the final half-hour are highlights". A critic from The Hans India wrote that "In conclusion, "The Great Indian Suicide" is a different and orientated movie with a relevant message. It effectively blends suspense, drama, and social issues to create a compelling narrative. It is a must-watch for those who enjoy suspenseful thrillers with a meaningful story". A critic from Sakshi Post wrote that "The Great Indian Suicide is a statement against superstitions and suicidal thinking that a lot of depressed people go through. It is a watchable film".
