= Iddari Lokam Okate =

2019 film directed by G. R. Krishna

- Theatrical release poster
- Directed by: G.R. Krishna
- Based on: Love Likes Coincidences by Ipek Sorak
- Produced by: Sirish
- Starring: Raj Tarun; Shalini Pandey
- Cinematography: Sameer Reddy
- Edited by: Tammiraju
- Music by: Mickey J Meyer
- Production company: Sri Venkateswara Creations
- Release date: 25 December 2019
- Running time: 126 minutes
- Country: India
- Language: Telugu

Iddari Lokam Okate (transl. Their world is one) is a 2019 Indian romantic drama film directed by G.R. Krishna and produced by Sirish under Dil Raju's Sri Venkateswara Creations. It's a remake of 2011 Turkish film Love Likes Coincidences. Starring Raj Tarun and Shalini Pandey, the film follows story of Varshini (Pandey) and her chance meetings with Mahi (Tarun). The music of the film is composed by Mickey J Meyer.

== Plot ==
The story revolves around childhood sweethearts Mahi and Varsha who get separated when Varsha goes to city for further studies. 18 years later, Mahi runs a photo gallery and exhibits Varsha's childhood photo in it. The rest of the story deals with whether they meet and fall in love.

== Cast ==
- Raj Tarun as Mahi
  - Master Roshan as young Mahi
  - Master Nikhil (Nikhil Devadula) as 15 year old Mahi
- Shalini Pandey as Varsha
  - Nethra as young Varsha
  - Sahithi Avancha as 15 year old Varsha
- Nassar as Ranga Rao, Varsha's grandfather
- Master Bharath as Mahi's friend
- Raja Chembolu as Rahul
- Rohini as Varsha's mother
- Shiju as Varsha's father
- Prudhvi Raj as Mukesh
- Siri Hanmanth as Varsha's friend
- Kalpa Latha as Mahi's mother
- Appaji Ambarisha Darbha as Mahi's father
- Satish Saripalli as Mahi's father's friend

== Production ==
Raj Tarun launched Iddari Lokam Okate in April 2019 with director G R Krishna, to be produced by Dil Raju and Sri Venkateswara Creations. Later Shalini Pandey was cast as leading lady. The filming began in May 2019 in Hyderabad.

== Soundtrack ==
The soundtrack is composed by Mickey J. Meyer.

Iddari Lokam Okate

Soundtrack album by Mickey J. Meyer
- Released: 21 December 2019
- Recorded: 2019
- Genre: Feature film soundtrack
- Language: Telugu
- Label: Aditya Music

Mickey J. Meyer chronology
Gaddalakonda Ganesh (2019)	Iddari Lokam Okate (2019)	Sreekaram (2021)

Track List
No.	Title	Lyrics	Singer(s)	Length
1.	"You Are My Heart Beat"	Balaji	Anurag Kulkarni	3:40
2.	"La La La La"	Shree Mani	Sameera Bharadwaj	3:57
3.	"Ade Ooru"	Kittu Vissapragada	Nutana Mohan	4:32
4.	"Chirunavve"	Balaji	Ishaq Vali	3:43
5.	"Hola Hola"	Shree Mani	Anurag Kulkarni, Aditi Bhavaraju	4:00
6.	"Anaganaga"	Balaji	Mohana Bhogaraju

== Release ==
The film was released on 25 December 2019.
