= Bhari Taraganam =

2023 Telugu romantic drama film

- Directed by: Sekhar Muthyala
- Written by: Sekhar Muthyala
- Starring: Sadan; Dipika Reddy; Rekha Nirosha; Posani Krishna Murali
- Cinematography: MV Gopi
- Edited by: Marthand K. Venkatesh
- Music by: Sukku
- Production company: BVR Pictures
- Release date: 23 June 2023
- Running time: 144 minutes
- Country: India
- Language: Telugu

Bhari Taraganam is a 2023 Indian Telugu-language romantic drama film written and directed by Sekhar Muthyala and produced by BV Reddy under BVR Pictures. The main lead roles are Sadan, Dipika Reddy, Rekha Nirosha and Posani Krishna Murali. It was released on 23 June 2023.

== Cast ==
- Sadan as Sadan
- Dipika Reddy as Tara
- Rekha Nirosha as Dhanalakshmi
- Posani Krishna Murali
- Satya Prakash
- Thotapalli Madhu as Raghu
- Kedar Shankar
- Prabhavathi
- Chatrapathi Sekhar
- Sameer
- Sarayu as Chittemma
- Sahithi Dasari

== Soundtrack ==
Sukku composed the music, distribution rights were acquired by Aditya Music.

Bhari Taraganam

Soundtrack album by Sukku
- Released: 2023
- Recorded: 2022–2023
- Genre: Feature film soundtrack
- Language: Telugu
- Label: Aditya Music
- Producer: Sukku

Tracklist
No.	Title	Lyrics	Singer(s)	Length
1.	"Yelo Yelo"	Sukku	Yazin Nizar	3:34
2.	"Chittemma Dhaba"	Sekhar Muthyala	Geetha Madhuri, Hemachandra (singer)	3:32
3.	"Bapu Bomma"	Sukku	Yazin Nizar, Spoorthi Yadagiri	3:48
4.	"Rende Rendu Aksharala"	Sukku	Jayasri Pallem	3:00

== Reception ==
Bhari Taraganam received mixed reviews from critics and audience. Neeshita Nyayapati of The Hans India gave it a rating of 3 out of 5 stars and wrote 'director Shekhar Mutyala has kept the audience glued to their seats throughout the film. It must be acknowledged that he has had great success bringing his literary novels to life on screen.
