= Uruku Patela =

2024 Indian comedy thriller film by Vivek Reddy

- Theatrical release poster
- Directed by: Vivek Reddy
- Written by: Vivek Reddy; Tejus Kancherla
- Produced by: Kancherla Bala Bhanu
- Starring: Tejus Kancherla; Khushboo Choudhary
- Cinematography: Sunny Kurapati
- Edited by: Sasank Vupputuri
- Music by: Pravin Lakkaraju
- Production company: Lead Edge Pictures
- Distributed by: Mythri Movie Distributors; Annapurna Studios
- Release date: 7 September 2024
- Running time: 121 minutes
- Country: India
- Language: Telugu

Uruku Patela (transl. Run Patela) is a 2024 Indian Telugu-language comedy thriller film co-written and directed by Vivek Reddy. It stars Tejus Kancherla and Khushboo Choudhary in lead roles. The film was released on 7 September 2024.

== Plot ==
The protagonist finds himself entrapped in a maze of love and deceit from the lady whom he loves but is trying to have him killed.

== Cast ==
- Tejus Kancherla as Patela
- Khushboo Choudhary as Dr. Akshara
- Goparaju Ramana as Rama Raju, Patela's father
- Chakrapani Ananda
- Uma Maheshwar Rao Inabathi
- Chammak Chandra as Attar Mawa
- Sudharshan as Dr. Chirag
- Viva Raghav
- Jay Chandra
- Lavanya Reddy as Shreya
- Malakpet Sailaja

== Music ==
The background score and soundtrack is composed by Pravin Lakkaraju. The audio rights were acquired by Aditya Music.

All music is composed by Pravin Lakkaraju.

Track list
No.	Title	Lyrics	Singer(s)	Length
1.	"Patnam Pilla"	Kasarla Shyam	Rahul Sipligunj	3:28
2.	"Ori Mayaloda"	Srinivasa Mouli	Spoorthi Jithender	3:56
3.	"Melam Mogene"	Sreejo	Saketh Komanduri, Sahithi Chaganti	4:21
4.	"Bhayam"	Sreejo	Sai Charan	1:45

== Release ==
Uruku Patela was released on 7 September 2024. Post-theatrical digital streaming rights were acquired by Amazon Prime Video and premiered on 18 October 2024.

== Reception ==
News18 Telugu gave a mixed rating of 2.75 out of 5. Satya Pulagam of ABP Desam praised the performance of lead cast while being negative about screenplay and direction.
