= Bhale Unnade =

- Theatrical release poster
- Directed by: J. Sivasai Vardhan
- Produced by: N.V. Kiran Kumar
- Starring: Raj Tarun; Manisha Kandkur
- Music by: Shekar Chandra
- Production company: Maruthi Films
- Release date: 13 September 2024
- Country: India
- Language: Telugu

Bhale Unnade is a 2024 Indian Telugu-language romantic comedy-drama film directed by J. Sivasai Vardhan. It stars Raj Tarun and Manisha Kandkur in the lead roles, with supporting performances by Abhirami, Singeetam Srinivasa Rao, and others. The film explores contemporary themes of gender dynamics and relationships, focusing on a protagonist who defies traditional masculinity.

Released theatrically on 13 September 2024, it received mixed reviews from critics, who praised its concept but criticized its execution and narration. The film was later made available on OTT platforms, where it was widely regarded as a commercial failure.

== Plot ==
Bhale Unnade revolves around Radha (Raj Tarun), a saree draper whose empathetic and unconventional approach challenges traditional masculinity, blending humor and emotion in his romantic journey with his love interest Krishna (Manisha Kandkur). The film attempts to explore modern gender dynamics but struggles with pacing in its second half, where the storyline lacks depth, a point critics noted as a missed opportunity.

== Cast ==
- Raj Tarun as Radha
- Manisha Kandkur as Krishna
- Abhirami as Gowri, Radha’s mother
  - Ammu Abhirami as young Gowri
- Goparaju Ramana as Radha’s uncle
- VTV Ganesh as Director Bhanu Prasad
- Srikanth Iyengar as Dr. Anand Kumar "Guruji"
- Singeetam Srinivasa Rao as Old man
- Leela Samson as Old man’s wife
- Hyper Aadi as Prathap, Radha’s friend
- Sudharshan as Chinna, Krishna’s fiancee
- Krishna Bhagawan as Nagaraju, Gowri’s colleague
- Mani Chandana as Krishna’s mother
- Srinivas Vadlamani as Krishna’s father
- Indhu as Sowmya, Krishna’s friend
- Racha Ravi as Murthy, Guruji’s assistant
- Sathvik Anand as Chiguru, Guruji’s assistant
- Shaking Seshu as Chinna’s father
- Ananth Babu as Dr. Genius
- Shabeena Shaik as Nurse Sarika
- Satish Saripalli as Gowri’s father
- Jaya Naidu as Gowri’s mother
- Rakesh Rachakonda as Gowri’s brother
- Abhinav Manikanta as Kishan, Gowri’s husband and Radha’s father

== Production ==
The film was announced in mid-2024, with a trailer released on 16 August hinting at a light-hearted romantic comedy with a unique twist. Directed by J. Sivasai Vardhan, it was produced under Maruthi Films. Raj Tarun, marking his third release within a 30-day period, took on the role of a saree draper, an unconventional choice for a male lead in Telugu cinema. The film's release date was confirmed as 13 September 2024.

== Themes ==
The film emphasizes "soft manhood," promoting qualities like empathy and emotional intelligence over traditional masculinity. Critics noted this as a refreshing yet underdeveloped angle in Telugu cinema.

== Soundtrack ==
Bhale Unnade

Soundtrack album by Shekar Chandra
- Released: 12 April 2024
- Genre: Feature film soundtrack
- Length: 17:04
- Language: Telugu
- Label: Aditya Music

Shekar Chandra chronology
Ooru Peru Bhairavakona (2024)	Bhale Unnade (2024)	Pottel (2024)
External audio
- Bhale Unnade – Jukebox on YouTube

The soundtrack was composed by Shekar Chandra.

Track listing
No.	Title	Lyrics	Singer(s)	Length
1.	"Adollaki Amada Dhooram"	Purnachary	Dhanunjay Seepana	3:19
2.	"Set Avuthundhaa Pairu"	Krishna Kanth	Kapil Kapilan	3:54
3.	"Sofia"	Shekar Chandra, Dev, Kareemullah	Kareemullah	3:20
4.	"Never End Story"	Chaitu Satsangi	Mangli	3:19
5.	"Bava Rava"	Purnachary	Dheeraj M.	0:53
6.	"Anathi Nivvu"	Nikesh Kumar Dasagrandhi	Akshaya Sai	2:19
Total length:				17:04

== Release ==
Bhale Unnade premiered in theaters on 13 September 2024.

=== Critical reception ===
Critics offered a mixed reception to Bhale Unnade. The Times of India described it as a "light-hearted romantic dramedy with a fresh take on relationships and gender dynamics," appreciating its quirky approach. However, OTTplay noted that while it had "a very good subject," the "underwhelming narration" hindered its potential, particularly in the second half. The New Indian Express similarly called it "a lost opportunity," citing its failure to capitalize on an unusual hero.

Other reviews echoed these sentiments. Eenadu and TV9 Telugu acknowledged the film's decent performances but criticized its ineffective storytelling. Samayam Telugu and NTV Telugu gave it moderate ratings, pointing to a lack of narrative coherence. ABP Live Telugu noted some public appreciation for its emotional depth but agreed the execution fell short.

=== Box office ===
Bhale Unnade underperformed at the box office and was labeled a "massive flop" upon its OTT release in October 2024.

=== Home media ===
The film was later streamed on ETV Win starting 6 October 2024.
