= Ekkadiki Pothavu Chinnavada =

- Theatrical release poster
- Directed by: Vi Anand
- Screenplay by: Vi Anand
- Dialogues by: Abburi Ravi
- Story by: Vi Anand
- Produced by: P. V. Rao
- Starring: Nikhil Siddharth; Hebah Patel; Nandita Swetha; Avika Gor
- Cinematography: Sai Sriram
- Edited by: Chota K. Prasad
- Music by: Shekar Chandra
- Production company: Meghana Arts
- Release date: 18 November 2016
- Running time: 139 minutes
- Country: India
- Language: Telugu

Ekkadiki Pothavu Chinnavada (transl. Where will you go, little boy?) is a 2016 Telugu-language supernatural romantic thriller film written and directed by Vi Anand and produced by P. V. Rao. It stars Nikhil Siddharth, Hebah Patel, Nandita Swetha and Avika Gor. The film has dialogues by Abburi Ravi, music composed by Shekar Chandra, cinematography by Sai Sriram, and editing by Chota K. Prasad. It released on 18 November 2016 to positive reviews from critics and audiences and was a commercial blockbuster. It is being remade into Tamil as Aayiram Jenmangal.

== Plot ==
The opening credits depict a spirit that had previously been captured in a bottle, but it is shattered now and the spirit manages to escape.

In 2012, Arjun waits at the marriage registrar's office for his girlfriend Ayesha to arrive for their wedding. However, Ayesha doesn't show up, leaving Arjun heartbroken.

Four years later, Kishore, a cousin of Arjun's friend, becomes mentally disturbed and believes he is possessed by a spirit due to multiple rejections from girls. Arjun takes Kishore to Mahishasura Mandir in Kerala for treatment. While Kishore is being treated, Arjun becomes attracted to a girl named Amala and falls in love with her. Kishore's treatment is completed, and Arjun is devastated to learn that Amala has left without informing him.

Determined to find her, Arjun travels to her hometown, Vijayawada, only to discover that Amala had died in an accident four years ago and the girl he met in Kerala was not Amala. Back in Hyderabad, Arjun comes across the girl who met him as Amala and discovers that her name is actually Nithya, and she has a completely different personality from the one he saw in Kerala. Arjun learns from Nithya's sister that Nithya was possessed by a spirit named Amala, who had died in an accident.

Over time, Arjun and Nithya grow closer, but during this time, Amala's spirit enters another girl's body and comes to Arjun's house. Although Arjun is terrified, he maintains his composure in her presence. One day, Nithya calls Arjun to meet, so Arjun lies to Amala that he has a meeting with film director S. S. Rajamouli. When Amala discovers the truth, she goes to the building where they are meeting and witnesses Nithya and Arjun kissing.

After returning home, a shattered Amala reveals to Arjun the fact that she is none other than Ayesha, whose actual name is Amala. Her backstory reveals that Arjun and Amala met in 2012 and Arjun fell in love with her without seeing her face (only her eyes through her Burqa) and not knowing her real identity (mistaking her for a Muslim girl named Ayesha). When Amala/Ayesha tries to avoid Arjun stating that she is not interested in relationship but only marriage, Arjun proposes to her and makes arrangements of their wedding within two days. Amala is touched and is ready to reveal her real self on the day of their planned wedding. Unfortunately on that day, she is chased by an eve-teaser and meets with a road accident and dies instantly. She explains that she possessed the girl named Parvathi and saved her from attempting suicide because Parvathi was being forced to marry her maternal uncle, Rajan.

Upon hearing this, Arjun feels guilty and sad that he couldn't recognize her. He tries to stop her, but Amala doesn't listen to his plea. Amala believes that Arjun no longer loves her and leaves Parvathi's body. When Parvathi regains consciousness, she doesn't recognize Arjun. At that moment, Parvathi's uncle arrives and beats up Arjun. Just as he is about to kill Arjun, Amala's soul re-enters Parvathi's body and saves him. While Arjun is admitted in the hospital, Amala learns from Nithya that Arjun still loves her, which is why he rejected Nithya's proposal, saying he still loves Ayesha and only liked Nithya as her behaviour resembled that of Ayesha in Kerala. Amala realises that Arjun's perception of her has changed. Feeling guilty for her actions against Arjun, she decides to propose to him once again.

At this point, Kishore tricks Amala into going home, and he informs Arjun that with the help of Swamiji, who had exorcised him in Kerala, they can make Amala's soul leave Parvathi's body and capture it. Not ready to lose Amala again, Arjun rushes home just as Swamiji removes Amala's spirit from Parvathi's body and seals it in a bottle. Swamiji consoles Arjun, explaining that he didn't intend to separate the lovers, but it is against God's will for a soul to remain on Earth after death.

Several months later, Arjun encounters Nithya on the road, and he notices her behaviour resembling that of Amala. He ends up proposing to her for marriage, and Nithya smiles. At the same time, Parvathi returns home, but her uncle allows her to marry the man of her choice and runs away due to her behaviour at Arjun's house.

== Cast ==
- Nikhil Siddharth as Arjun
- Avika Gor as Amala / Ayesha
- Hebah Patel as Nithya Vaidhyanand (Possessed as Amala) (Voice dubbed by Lipsika Bhashyam)
- Nandita Swetha as Parvathi (Possessed as Amala)
- Vennela Kishore as Kishore
- Satya as Satya, Arjun's friend
- Viva Harsha as Arjun's friend
- Sudharshan as Arjun's friend
- Josh Ravi as Arjun's friend
- Raja Ravindra as Rajan, Parvathi's uncle
- Tanikella Bharani as Amala's father
- Annapoorna as Nithya's grandmother
- Apoorva Srinivasan as Nithya's sister
- Prudhviraj as Doctor
- Praveen as Ghanta Ram
- Jeeva as Inspector
- Swamiji
- Fish Venkat

== Music ==
The music was composed by Shekar Chandra.

Ekkadiki Pothavu Chinnavada

Soundtrack album by Shekar Chandra
- Released: 2016
- Genre: Feature film soundtrack
- Length: 13:34
- Language: Telugu
- Label: Aditya Music
- Producer: Shekar Chandra

Shekar Chandra chronology
Cinema Choopistha Mava (2016)	Ekkadiki Pothavu Chinnavada (2016)	Nanna Nenu Naa Boyfriends (2016)
External audio
- Ekkadiki Pothavu Chinnavada – Jukebox on YouTube

Track listing
No.	Title	Lyrics	Singer(s)	Length
1.	"Chirunama Thana Chirunama"	Sri Mani	Yazin Nizar, Kareemulla	3:46
2.	"Vandha Speedulo"	Ramajogayya Sastry	Dhanunjay, Sweekar	3:42
3.	"Neetho Unte Chalu"	Ramajogayya Sastry	Ramya Behara	2:53
4.	"Masthundhi Life"	Prasanna Bezawada	Shekar Chandra	3:13
Total length:				13:34

== Accolades ==
Ceremony	Category	Nominee	Result	Ref.
64th Filmfare Awards South	Best Supporting Actress - Telugu	Nandita Swetha	Won	
2016 Nandi Awards	Best Female Dubbing Artist	Lipsika Bhashyam	Won	
