= Rahul Ravindran =

Indian actor, director, screenwriter (born 1981)

- Born: 23 June 1981 (age 45); Madras, Tamil Nadu, India
- Occupations: Actor; Director; Screenwriter
- Years active: 2005–present
- Spouse: Chinmayi Sripada (m. 2014)
- Children: 2

Rahul Ravindran (born 23 June 1981) is an Indian actor, director, and screenwriter who works in Telugu and Tamil films. He made his debut in the Tamil film Moscowin Kavery (2010) before making his Telugu film debut with Andala Rakshasi (2012). He made his Hindi debut in Jigra (2024).

He made his debut as a director with a Telugu film Chi La Sow (2018) for which he won the National Award for Best Original Screenplay.

== Early life ==
Rahul Ravindran was born on 23 June 1981 in Chennai to Tamil parents. His roots are from the Thanjavur district of Tamil Nadu. After graduating from Vidya Mandir Senior Secondary School, he earned his BCom. He then went on to get an MBA, and then was an assistant brand manager for a media company in Mumbai.

== Career ==
It was in Mumbai, while dining at a restaurant, that he got an offer to audition for a television commercial to be directed by Dibakar Banerjee of Khosla Ka Ghosla fame, and the success of that fetched him more commercials. During this period he was also dubbing in Tamil for cartoons and children's shows being aired on television channels, notably being the Tamil voice of the Red Ranger in Power Rangers – Mystic Force and the White Ranger in Power Rangers SPD.

He then quit his job and came back to Chennai to try to find work as an assistant director, but before he could do so director Ravi Varman's team members saw his ad work and called him to audition for Moscowin Kavery. The film introduced a host of new actors including Samantha, with music carried out by Thaman, then making his debut in music composing. However, due to Ravi Varman's date conflicts with his projects as a cinematographer, the film languished in development hell, eventually releasing in August 2010. The film gained unanimously poor reviews from critics, with Rahul winning mixed reviews for his performance. Most critics said that his performance was "wooden" and that he "smiles too much, and looks like he could do well, given the chance".

He was next seen in Vignesh Menon's Vinmeengal, where he played Jeeva, who is affected by cerebral palsy. The film which also featured Anuja Iyer, Bhavana Rao and Pandiarajan won above average reviews, with Rahul's performance being appreciated. Behindwoods.com noted that "the handsome Rahul Ravindran utilizes his opportunity and delivers the goods well." However, the critic from The Hindu noted "at times Rahul's trauma doesn't come out effectively, so you feel he could have done better". His third film, Chellamuthu's Sooriya Nagaram opposite Meera Nandan faced a much smaller release and won average reviews from critics. Playing Vetrivel, a shop mechanic in Madurai, the film focussed on inter-caste marriage and parental opposition, with a critic citing that Rahul is "good and emotes well". Later in 2012, he featured in the Telugu film Andala Rakshasi, earning positive reviews for his performance and earning him further opportunities in the Telugu film industry.

In 2013, Rahul played a supporting role in the romantic comedy Vanakkam Chennai, featuring alongside Shiva and Priya Anand, with the film performing well at the box office. His Telugu releases in the year, Pelli Pustakam and Nenem…Chinna Pillana?, had significantly smaller budgets and did not fare as well. His 2014 release, Ala Ela became a sleeper hit at the box office, with the film earning audiences through positive word-of-mouth via social media. In 2015, he acted as childhood friends in the action entertainer Tiger with Sundeep Kishan followed the family entertainer, Srimanthudu which also stars with Mahesh Babu. In 2018, he then starred in the romance films Hyderabad Love Story and Howrah Bridge. He also won the National Film Award for Best Original Screenplay for his debut film Chi La Sow. Rahul Ravindran was seen in the Tamil and Telugu remakes of the Kannada film U Turn starring Samantha and Aadhi Pinisetty.

In 2019, he directed Manmadhudu 2 was a failure. In 2021, he also starred with Nani and Sai Pallavi in Shyam Singha Roy.

In 2023, he played the role of the husband in the Tamil drama The Great Indian Kitchen, a remake of the Malayalam version was released to highly positive reviews from critics and audiences. In 2024, he made his Hindi debut in the action-thriller Jigra (2024), starring Alia Bhatt and Vedang Raina.

== Personal life ==
Rahul Ravindran is married to singer Chinmayi Sripaada in May 2014, whom he began dating in June 2013 after meeting her at the premiere of Andala Rakshasi. Chinmayi dubbed for the heroine in the movie. They have twin children (Driptah & Sharvas).

He has a younger brother, Rohit, who is a professional photographer.

== Filmography ==
Key
†	Denotes films that have not yet been released

=== As an actor ===
List of Rahul Ravindran film credits as actor
Year	Film	Role	Language	Notes
2010	Moscowin Kavery	Moscow	Tamil	Tamil Debut; Credited as Rahul
2012	Vinmeengal	Jeeva	Tamil	
2012	Sooriya Nagaram	Vetrivel	Tamil	Credited as Rahul
2012	Andala Rakshasi	Gautham Prakash	Telugu	Telugu Debut
2013	Pelli Pustakam	Rahul Srinivas	Telugu	
2013	Vanakkam Chennai	Deepak	Tamil	
2013	Nenem Chinna Pillana	Krish	Telugu	
2014	Galipatam	Aarav Reddy	Telugu	
2014	Ala Ela	Karthik	Telugu	
2015	Tiger	Vishnu	Telugu	
2015	Srimanthudu	Karthik	Telugu	
2018	Howrah Bridge	Arjun	Telugu	
2018	Hyderabad Love Story	Karthik	Telugu	
2018	U Turn	Aditya	Tamil	Bilingual film
2018	U Turn	Aditya	Telugu	Bilingual film
2019	Dhrusti	Mohan	Telugu	
2021	Most Eligible Bachelor	Passerby & Megha's cousin	Telugu	Cameo appearance
2021	Shyam Singha Roy	Manoj Singha Roy	Telugu	
2022	Sita Ramam	Rahul Varma IFS	Telugu	
2023	The Great Indian Kitchen	Husband	Tamil	
2024	Guntur Kaaram	Vyra Raja Gopal	Telugu	
2024	Chaari 111	CM GMR	Telugu	
2024	Manamey	Joseph	Telugu	
2024	Jigra	Karthik "Muthu" Muthuraman	Hindi	Hindi Debut
2025	They Call Him OG	Bhadra	Telugu	
2025	The Girlfriend	Prof. Sudheer (HOD)	Telugu	Also writer & director
2026	Sing Geetham	Uday Mannem	Telugu	Cameo appearance

=== As a director ===
List of Rahul Ravindran film credits as director
Year	Film	Language	Notes	Ref.
2018	Chi La Sow	Telugu	National Film Award for Best Original Screenplay	
2019	Manmadhudu 2	Telugu		
2025	The Girlfriend	Telugu		

=== As a dubbing artist ===
List of Rahul Ravindran film and television credits as dubbing artist
Year	Film	Actor	Role	Language	Notes
2005	Power Rangers S.P.D.		White Ranger	Tamil	TV series; dubbed version
2006	Power Rangers Mystic Force		Red Ranger	Tamil	TV series; dubbed version
2018	Chi La Sow	—N/a	Prospective Groom	Telugu	
2021	83	Jiiva		Telugu	Dubbed Version
2023	Anni Manchi Sakunamule	Ashwin Kumar		Telugu	
