= Orey Bujjiga =

2020 film by Vijay Kumar Konda

- Release poster
- Directed by: Vijay Kumar Konda
- Written by: Vijay Kumar Konda
- Produced by: K. K. Radhamohan
- Starring: Raj Tarun; Malavika Nair; Hebah Patel
- Cinematography: I. Andrew
- Edited by: Prawin Pudi
- Music by: Anup Rubens
- Distributed by: Aha
- Release date: 2 October 2020
- Running time: 153 minutes
- Country: India
- Language: Telugu

Orey Bujjiga (transl. Hey Bujji) is a 2020 Indian Telugu-language romantic comedy film starring Raj Tarun, Malavika Nair and Hebah Patel in the lead roles. The film is directed by Vijay Kumar Konda and produced by K. K. Radhamohan. The film was initially scheduled to release on 25 March 2020, but was postponed due to COVID-19 pandemic. The film is released directly on Aha on 2 October 2020.

== Plot ==
The film starts in Nidadavolu Town in West Godavari District in Andhra Pradesh State as Bujji's parents fix a match for him. Upset with this, he leaves his town and goes to Hyderabad for his girlfriend Srujana. Meanwhile, Krishnaveni also flees to Hyderabad for the same reason. But the entire town feels that Bujji has eloped with Krishnaveni. When Krishnaveni discovers this, she is upset with Bujji. The twist in the tale arises when Krishnaveni gets to meet Bujji as Swathi. Bujju eventually understands that Srujana is just using him and break up with her. Love blossoms between Bujji and Swathi and one fine day, Bujji learns that Krishnaveni is the girl who has run away from her town and hates him. The rest of the story is as to how Bujji sets things right and wins his love.

== Cast ==
- Raj Tarun as Srinivas alias "Bujji"
- Malavika Nair as Krishnaveni alias "Swathi" (Voice dubbed by RJ Swetha)
- Hebah Patel as Srujana
- Posani Krishna Murali as Koteswara Rao, Srinivas' father
- Vani Viswanath as Chamundeswari, Krishnaveni's mother
- Naresh as Krishnaveni's father
- Raja Ravindra as Krishnaveni's uncle
- Anish Kuruvilla as Project Manager
- Saptagiri as Saptagiri
- Madhunandan as Srinivas's friend
- Annapoorna as Krishnaveni's grandmother
- Satya as Gopi
- Siri Hanmanth as Sweety, Krishnaveni's friend
- Jayalakshmi as Srinivas' mother
- Ajay Ghosh
- Satyam Rajesh
- Varsha
- Pammi Sai
- Bhadram
- Riya

== Soundtrack ==
The film's sound track consists of five songs which were released on YouTube. The songs are composed by Anup Rubens.

Track listing

No.	Title	Lyrics	Singer(s)	Length
1.	"Ee Maya Peremito"	Kittu Vissapragada	Sid Sriram	4:16
2.	"Kurisena"	Krishna Kanth	Armaan Malik, P Meghana	4:09
3.	"Krishnaveni"	Kasarla Shyam	Rahul Sipligunj	3:47
4.	"Sarigama"	Vanamali	Anup Rubens	3:02
5.	"Kalalu Chusina Kannuley"	Kasarla Shyam	Sid Sriram	2:50
Total length:				18:04

== Reception ==
Thadhagath Pathi of The Times of India rated the film 2 stars out of 5 and wrote, "Dull, predictable and cliched, Orey Bujjiga falters on many levels and truly tests your patience." A review of The Hans India gave 2.5 out of 5 and stated that "sloppy screenplay will test the patience of the audience." Andhra Jyothi also criticized the film for its weak screenplay, opining that it is devoid of any "twists and turns." The reviewer also added that the film's score by Rubens is forgettable.

The Hindu's Sangeetha Devi wrote that "The Telugu rom-com rides on an old, predictable tale", and added "Apart from a few comic segments that overstay their welcome, the lack of depth to some of the characters makes the film disappointing."
