= Biker (film) =

2026 Indian film by Abhilash Kankara

- Theatrical release poster
- Directed by: Abhilash Reddy Kankara
- Written by: Abhilash Reddy Kankara; MVS Bharadwaj; Shravan Madala
- Produced by: V. Vamsi Krishna Reddy; Pramod Uppalapati
- Starring: Sharwanand; Rajasekhar; Malvika Nair; Atul Kulkarni
- Cinematography: J. Yuvaraj
- Edited by: Anil Kumar Pasala
- Music by: Ghibran Vaibodha
- Production company: UV Creations
- Distributed by: Think Studios; Shloka Entertainment; E4 Entertainment
- Release date: 3 April 2026
- Running time: 162 minutes
- Country: India
- Language: Telugu
- Budget: ₹45 crore
- Box office: ₹43 crore

Biker is a 2026 Indian Telugu-language sports drama film co-written and directed by Abhilash Reddy Kankara. Inspired by the 1984 Bengali film Boxer, the film was produced by V. Vamsi Krishna Reddy and Pramod Uppalapati, under UV Creations. The film stars Sharwanand, Rajasekhar, Malvika Nair, and Atul Kulkarni.

== Plot ==
Vikas Narayanan owns a workshop and Vikas's wife, Ananya is a professional photographer. Vikas and Ananya raise their kid, Ishan in a friendly manner without forcing anything. Vikas / Vicky used to be a Motocross Racer and stays away from his father.

Vikas's father, Sunil Narayanan used to be a Motocross Racer and now works as a coach in a company named ING. ING's chief, Indraneel Chirag insults Sunil in a press conference due to continuous failures and proceeds to recover Sunil's debts.

In the past, Vikas wins a race with Sunil's advice despite rain and muddy tracks. Vikas and Ananya / Anu get intimate. Sunil is unable to convince Indraneel to sponsor Vikas in motocross. Sunil trains Vikas and Ananya supports Vikas. Vikas wins Anwar's motocross challenge by successfully jumping across a cliff. After seeing Vikas's jump in a magazine, Indraneel agrees to sponsor Vikas. Sunil signs a six year contract with ING and Ananya is pregnant.

At present, Vikas pays off Sunil's debt with ING and decides to race again despite Ananya's protests. Sunil refuses to train Vikas.

In the past, Vikas marries Ananya without informing Sunil. Before the Malaysian Motocross Championship, Anwar sabotages Vikas's bike. Ananya goes into labour and during the race Anwar's bike gets on flames. Vikas pushes Anwar into water and finishes the race in third place. Anwar is seriously injured. Ananya gives birth and convinces Vikas to quit racing.

At present, Vikas is unable to focus on racing. Anwar starts to train and on Sudarshan's request, Sunil trains Vikas. Anwar sponsors Vikas for the Grandprix Motocross World Championship to be held in Teutschenthal, Germany. Indraneel sponsors Fernando and conspires against Vikas. Ananya leaves Ishan with Vikas and Ishan bonds with Sunil. Sunil convinces Ananya to support Vikas. On Indraneel orders, three racers deliberately block Vikas from moving forward and knocks Vikas off the track. Vikas gets back up, continues to race and knocks off those three players. Vikas wins the Motocross Championship and dedicates the victory to Sunil. Sunil refuses Indraneel's offer to join the ING again.

== Cast ==
- Sharwanand as Vikas "Vicky" Narayan
- Rajasekhar as Bullet Sunil Narayan, Vicky’s father (Dubbed by P. Sai Kumar)
- Malvika Nair as Ananya, Vicky’s love-interest turned wife
- Atul Kulkarni as Indraneel Chirag, ING Chief
- Brahmaji as Mahesh
- Tulasi as Ananya’s mother
- Shashank as Aman, Sunil’s friend
- Shourya Chelemella as Ishaan, Vicky and Ananya’s son
- Niroop Nandakumar as Anwar, Vicky’s rival turned sponsor
- Aakash Srinivas as Vicky’s first fanboy
- Dayanand Reddy as Daya, Anwar’s coach
- Matthew Varghese as Sudharshan
- Dhaassyam Geetha Bhascker as School Principal
- Naveen Neni as Mahesh’s assistant
- Aleksandar Alex as Fernando, International racer

== Production ==
The film required Sharwanand to portray both 18-year-old and 30-year-old versions of the protagonist. To portray the younger version, he lost weight.

== Music ==
Biker

Soundtrack album by Ghibran
- Released: 1 April 2026
- Recorded: 2025
- Genre: Feature film soundtrack
- Length: 20:40
- Language: Telugu
- Label: Aditya Music

Ghibran chronology
Draupathi 2 (2026)	Biker (2026)	Leader (2026)

The music is composed by Ghibran. The music rights are secured by Aditya Music.

Track listing
No.	Title	Lyrics	Singer(s)	Length
1.	"Pretty Baby"	Krishna Kanth	Sublahshini, Yazin Nizar	3:18
2.	"Ziddi Ziddi"	Krishna Kanth	Ghibran	2:06
3.	"Pasi Pasi Manase"	Krishna Kanth	Haricharan	3:22
4.	"Emaindo"	RR Dhruvan	Kapil Kapilan, Aditi Bhavaraju	2:43
5.	"Jaagore Jaagore"	Krishna Kanth	Sai Charan Bhaskaruni	4:49
6.	"Eppudo"	Hesham Abdul Wahab	Dinesh Kakkerla	4:22
Total length:				20:40

== Release ==
=== Theatrical ===
Biker was released theatrically on 3 April 2026, in standard and 4DX, PCX, 3D, Dolby Cinema, and EPIQ formats.

=== Home media ===
The post-theatrical digital streaming rights of the film were acquired by Netflix. The film began streaming on the platform from 1 May 2026.

== Reception ==
Sashidhar Adivi of Filmfare rated the film 3.5/5 stars and wrote, "Sharwanand anchors the film with a committed performance. His portrayal ensures that the emotional drama holds its own against the spectacle of the sport. [...] However, Biker doesn’t completely escape the clichés of the sports drama genre. Several supporting male characters are written with predictable aggression." Sandeep Athreya of Sakshi Post rated the film 3.25/5 and wrote, "While it doesn’t completely break away from familiar tropes, it offers enough engaging moments—especially in the racing segments—to keep viewers invested. Powered by strong performances from Sharwanand and Rajasekhar, the film makes for a decent one-time watch".

Jalapathy Gudelli of Telugucinema.com rated the film 3/5 and wrote, "While it has its share of pacing issues, the film offers a refreshing take on the sports genre. Abhilash Reddy deserves credit for introducing motocross to Telugu cinema and blending it effectively with sentiment." Yashaswini Sri of The Indian Express wrote, "When the sport is front and centre, it is a genuinely thrilling watch, one that justifies every rupee spent on the racing sequences. But the drama holding those sequences together is routine, underdeveloped, and set to a score that does it no favours."

Sanjay Ponnappa of India Today rated the film 2.5/5 stars and wrote, "Biker has its moments, especially in its racing sequences and the emotional father-son dynamic that lands towards the end. However, a predictable narrative, inconsistent engagement, and underwhelming drama hold it back from truly standing out." Sangeetha Devi Dundoo of The Hindu wrote, "Biker marks the return to form for Sharwanand, after a string of middling films. [...] On the whole, Biker is an engaging watch. Had it pushed itself to go beyond predictable turns, it could have been a standout film."
