= Angel (2017 film) =

2017 Indian film directed by Palani

- Theatrical release poster
- Directed by: Palani
- Produced by: Bhuvan Sagar
- Starring: Naga Anvesh; Hebah Patel
- Cinematography: Gunasekaran
- Music by: Bheems Ceciroleo
- Production company: Saraswathy Films
- Release date: 3 November 2017
- Country: India
- Language: Telugu

Angel is a 2017 Telugu language fantasy comedy film written and directed by Palani and produced by Bhuvan Sagar. The film stars Naga Anvesh and Hebah Patel in lead roles with Suman, Saptagiri, Sayaji Shinde, Kabir Duhan Singh, and Pradeep Rawat in supporting roles. The film's music was composed by Bheems Ceciroleo with cinematography by Gunasekaran. The film was released on 3 November 2017 and was dubbed and released in Tamil as Vinnaithaandi Vandha Angel. Later the film was dubbed in Hindi as Angel in 2018.

== Cast ==
- Naga Anvesh as Nani
- Hebah Patel as Nakshatra / Nandu
- Suman as Indra
- Saptagiri as Giri
- Kabir Duhan Singh as Garuda
- Sayaji Shinde
- Kasthuri Shankar as item number

== Soundtrack ==
The music is composed by Bheems Ceciroleo

Angel

Soundtrack album by Bheems Ceciroleo
- Released: 2017
- Genre: Soundtrack
- Producer: Bheems Ceciroleo

Bheems Ceciroleo chronology
Bengal Tiger (2015)	Angel (2017)	Nakshatram (2017)

No.	Title	Singer(s)	Length
1.	"Chinna Chinna Kalley"	Sunidhi Chauhan, Shahid Mallya	4:34
2.	"Amaravathi"	Nakash Aziz	4:09
3.	"Angel"	Bheems Ceciroleo, Chorus	1:14

== Critical reception ==
123Telugu wrote "On the whole, Angel is just an okay socio-fantasy entertainer which has some moments here and there. Hebah Patel’s performance and some good visuals are basic assets for the film." Indiaglitz wrote "A half-baked socio-fantasy that meets Kranthi Madhav's on-screen social agenda. Utterly predictable, the film treats almost everything half-heartedly." Telugu cinema wrote "Angel' is a formulaic socio-fantasy-comedy with no surprises in store. The hero's characterization suffers in the second half. Poor visuals, outdated villainy and a largely uninspiring comedy fail it."
