= Atithi Devo Bhava (film) =

2022 Indian Telugu-language film

- Theatrical release poster
- Directed by: Polimera Nageshawar
- Screenplay by: Rajani Rajababu
- Story by: K. Venugopal Reddy
- Produced by: Raja Babu Miryala; Ashok Reddy Miryala
- Starring: Aadi Saikumar; Nuveksha
- Cinematography: Amarnath Bommireddy
- Edited by: Karthika Srinivas
- Music by: Shekar Chandra
- Production company: Srinivasa Cine Creations
- Release date: 7 January 2022
- Running time: 133 minutes
- Country: India
- Language: Telugu

Atithi Devo Bhava (transl. Guests are our God) is a 2022 Indian Telugu-language romantic action film directed by debutant Polimera Nageshawar and produced by Srinivasa Cine Creations. The film stars Aadi Saikumar and Nuveksha with music composed by Shekar Chandra. The plot follows Abhay who has monophobia and his life takes a dramatic turn after meets his love interest. The film is released theatrically on 7 January 2022.

== Plot ==
Abhi suffers from a problem called Mono Phobia. Because of this, he cannot survive alone and always expects someone to be on his side. In this process, he falls in love with Vaishnavi. When everything seems to be going fine, Abhi's phobia creates new misunderstandings in his love story.

== Cast ==
- Aadi Saikumar as Abhay "Abhi" Ram
- Nuveksha as Vaishnavi
- Aadarsh Balakrishna
- Rohini as Abhi's mother
- Raghu Karumanchi
- Ravi Prakash
- Naveena Reddy
- Saptagiri

== Production and release ==
The film marks the directorial debut of Polimera Nageshawar. Filming primarily took place around Hyderabad while the songs were shot in Darjeeling. Shekar Chandra composed the music while Karthika Srinivas and Amarnath Reddy performed the editing and cinematography respectively. Atithi Devo Bhava was released on 7 January 2022 ahead of the festival of Sankranti, following the postponement of major Telugu productions like RRR and Radhe Shyam.

== Soundtrack ==
The soundtrack album consists of four singles composed by Shekar Chandra, and released by Sony Music South.

Atithi Devobhava (Original Motion Picture Soundtrack)
No.	Title	Lyrics	Singer(s)	Length
1.	"Baguntundhi Nuvvu Navvithe"	Bhaskarabhatla	Sid Sriram, Nutana Mohan	3:43
2.	"Ninnu Chudagane"	Bhaskarabhatla	Anurag Kulkarni	3:25
3.	"Gaaju Bomma Teeruna"	Krishna Kanth	Hrithika Aanandhi, Ritesh G Rao	3:41
4.	"Chinni Gunde"	Geetha Krishna	Sri Kavya Chandana, Ritesh G Rao	2:15
Total length:				13:04

== Reception ==
A reviewer from The Hans India rated the film 1.5 stars of 5 and wrote, "Atithi Devo Bhava is a regular and outdated romantic family entertainer that lacks impactful narration and convincing screenplay. Though the lead actors gave a decent performance, the film struggles with loopholes like uneven narration and outdated treatment." Anji Shetty of Sakshi, who also rated the same, opined that the director had failed in execution despite having a novel idea.

A reviewer from Eenadu appreciated the storyline and score but criticized the screenplay. Surya Prakash of Asianet News felt the film lacked a thriller element which could keep the audience hooked to the story while the comedy and action sequences were poorly handled.
