= Kittu Unnadu Jagratha =

2017 Indian Telugu-language comedy thriller film

- Directed by: Vamsi Krishna
- Written by: Srikanth Vissa
- Produced by: Ramabrahmam Sunkara
- Starring: Raj Tarun; Anu Emmanuel; Arbaaz Khan
- Cinematography: B. Rajasekar
- Edited by: M. R. Varma
- Music by: Anup Rubens
- Production company: A. K. Entertainments
- Release date: 3 March 2017
- Country: India
- Language: Telugu

Kittu Unnadu Jagratha (transl. Kittu is there, beware) is a 2017 Indian Telugu-language comedy thriller film directed by Vamsi Krishna and written by Srikanth Vissa. It starred Raj Tarun and Anu Emmanuel in the lead roles, along with Arbaaz Khan in a negative role. The music is by Anup Rubens. The film has completed censor board formalities and released on 3 March 2017.

== Plot ==
Kittu is a mechanical engineer who runs a car garage with his friends. He also kidnaps dogs and ask ransom money from the owners to set their dogs free. Kittu is in debts and has to pay money from a moneylender. When he and his friends gets caught, Kittu reveals his past to the moneylender:

Kittu met Janaki where he falls in love and pursue her to accept him, She reciprocates and they began a relationship. While repairing Janaki's car, He finds a bag from the car which consisted of ₹25 lakh (US$26,000), she asked him to bring it in the morning. However, the bag is stolen by his friend Babji. So, he and his friends had borrowed some money from the moneylender and also kidnaps dogs from the household for ransom in order to pay Janaki's debt. When Janaki finds out from her friend (whose dog was also kidnapped by Kittu), She breaks up with him.

AIR is a businessman and also an expert blackmailer who blackmails a CBI officer to stop investigating cricketer Prashanth Varma's death, who was also blackmailed by AIR for matchfixing. An IT raid occurs at his house headed by IT commissioner Aditya Narayan where he takes AIR's safe box which contains evidences of his blackmailed victims. He learns from Rishi, who is the mole in IT department that the safe is in IT headquarters safe and the IT access card can open the safe. He tells his brother Bhadra to kidnap Aditya Narayan's daughter.

Meanwhile, Janaki learns that Kittu was actually extorting money to pay off her debts. She calls him to arrive at a park for a chat. Kittu and his friends kidnap a dog which turns out to be Janaki's dog, but is kidnapped by Bhadra, only to learn that Janaki is Aditya Narayan's daughter. Bhadra demands Aditya Narayan for access card and also for ₹1 crore (US$100,000) crore for his expenses.

However, Aditya Narayan is thrown in a fix when Kittu calls him to hand over ₹5 lakh (US$5,200) for his dog (When he actually calls Janaki 'Baby') where he gives them ₹1 crore (US$100,000) and the access card, thinking that they are the kidnappers, but learns about the mix up and suffers from heart attack where he is admitted to the hospital. The SI begins the investigation only to apprehend Kittu and his friends where Kittu learns of Janaki's kidnapping.

The SI takes them to a forest to kill them, but the gun's bullets were removed by Kittu due to sudden brake in the car and they escape from the SI. Kittu and his friends decide to save Janaki where they steal Nimasi Baba/Santhanam's car and also learn about AIR's profession from Nimasi Baba/Santhanam as a blackmailer when they retrieve access car from the garage and also knocking Bhadra when he arrived at the garage to find the card.

The SI arrives at the garage where a shootout ensues. Kittu and his friend takes the car and drive towards the IT headquarters to steal the safe, they knock out Rishi where AIR calls Kittu to arrive at his hideout when AIR learns from Bhadra that Kittu has the safe. Kittu reunites with Janaki where AIR ask him about the safe. However, The moneylender and his henchman arrive at the hideout to apprehend Kittu.

However, Kittu mixes up everything and a shootout ensues. Kittu learns from Janaki that the money (which Janaki left in the car) was fake as Aditya Narayan learnt about Kittu and wanted to test his honesty and love for Janaki. They patch up and escape from the hideout where the SI tries to apprehend Kittu, but Janaki interferes and tells them about AIR, but is forced to release AIR as he blackmailed the CBI officer to release him.

The police leave the hideout where AIR holds Kittu and his friends at gunpoint and demands the safe, but Kittu peppersprays him with Pedigree meat spray and lets the howl of dogs to charge towards AIR. The next day, Kittu meets up with AIR in a mental asylum, where he makes him pretend to be mentally ill due to the dog bites and makes him to stay as mentally ill for his misdeeds.

In a park, Kittu and Janaki meets up where he kisses her without her consent, due to which Janaki funnily chases Kittu.

== Cast ==
- Raj Tarun as Kittu
- Anu Emmanuel as Janaki
- Arbaaz Khan as AIR
- Nagendra Babu as Aditya Narayan, IT officer and Janaki's father
- Vennela Kishore as Santhanam's right hand
- Prudhviraj as Rechukka
- Raghu Babu as Nimasi Baba/Santhanam
- Raja Ravindra as SI
- Prabhakar
- Raghu Karumanchi as Rechukka's henchman
- Venu Yeldandi as Rechukka's henchman
- Fish Venkat as Rechukka's henchman
- Praveen as Kittu's friend
- Sameer as Police Officer
- Sudharshan as Kittu's friend
- Samrat Reddy as Bhadra, AIR's brother
- Dr. Joshi Navodayan as Doctor

== Soundtrack ==
The music was composed by Anup Rubens and released by Aditya Music.

Kittu Unnadu Jagratha

Soundtrack album by Anup Rubens
- Released: Feb 13, 2017
- Recorded: 2017
- Genre: Soundtrack
- Length: 14:49
- Label: Aditya Music
- Producer: Anup Rubens

Anup Rubens chronology
Ism (2016)	Kittu Unnadu Jagratha (2017)	Katamarayudu (2017)

Track-List
No.	Title	Lyrics	Singer(s)	Length
1.	"Ardhamaindha"	Ramajogayya Sastry	Anurag Kulkarni, Anup Rubens	4:29
2.	"Johny Johny Yes Papa"	Raj Tarun	Ranjith	3:44
3.	"Naa Pere Singapore Sirimalli"	Ramajogayya Sastry	Geetha Madhuri	3:56
4.	"Bow Bow Boys"	Ramajogayya Sastry	Saisharan, Anup Rubens	2:40
Total length:				14:49

== Reception ==
Srivathsan Nadadhur of The Hindu rated the film three out of five stars and wrote, "Kittu Unnadu Jagratha doesn’t defy norms, but packages enough surprises to keep you entertained." Shyam Yadagiri of The New Indian Express gave the film two-and-a-half out of five stars and wrote, "All in all, with a decent storyline and funny scenes in between, Kittu Unnadu Jagratha is a one-time watch."

A critic from The Times of India gave it two-and-a-half out of five stars and wrote, "For the fans of Raj Tarun, the film might offer a few moments of weekend fun but the rest of the audience wouldn’t lose much if they give this a miss." Karthik Keramalu of The News Minute wrote, "The writer probably brought in several ideas and stitched them all together. Sometimes, the characters just don’t fit in the narrative."
