= Thank You Dear =

2025 Indian Telugu-language film by Thota Srikanth Kumar

- Theatrical release poster
- Directed by: Thota Srikanth Kumar
- Written by: Thota Srikanth Kumar
- Produced by: Pappu Balaji Reddy
- Starring: Dhanush Raghumudri; Hebah Patel; Rekha Nirosha
- Cinematography: P. L. K. Reddy
- Edited by: Raghavender Pebbeti
- Music by: Subhash Anand
- Production company: Mahalakshmi Productions
- Release date: 1 August 2025
- Country: India
- Language: Telugu

Thank You Dear is a 2025 Indian Telugu-language romantic thriller film written and directed by Thota Srikanth Kumar. The film features Dhanush Raghumudri, Hebah Patel and Rekha Nirosha in lead roles.

The film was released on 1 August 2025.

== Cast ==
- Dhanush Raghumudri as Sathyam
- Hebah Patel as Priya
- Rekha Nirosha as Janaki "Jaanu"
- Chandu Pappu
- Vera Shankar
- Naga Mahesh
- Ravi Prakash
- Chatrapathi Sekhar
- Meena Kumari
- Prabhavathi
- Kommu Sujatha MS

== Music ==
The music is composed by Subhash Anand.

Track listing
No.	Title	Lyrics	Singer(s)	Length
1.	"Chikkaka Chikkina Gumma"	Pappu Balaji Reddy	Saicharan Bhaskaruni	4:27

== Release and reception ==
Thank You Dear was released on 1 August 2025.

10TV gave a mixed review and rated it 2.5 out of 5. NTV too gave the same rating.
