= Savaari (2020 film) =

- Release poster
- Directed by: Saahith Mothkuri
- Written by: Saahith Mothkuri
- Produced by: Santhosh Mothkuri; Nishank Reddy Kudithi
- Starring: Nandu; Priyanka Sharma
- Cinematography: Monish Bhupathiraju
- Edited by: Santhosh Menam
- Music by: Shekar Chandra
- Production company: Kaalva Narasimha Swamy Productions
- Release date: 7 February 2020
- Running time: 133 minutes
- Country: India
- Language: Telugu

Savaari is a 2020 Indian Telugu-language romantic comedy film directed by Saahith Mothkuri in his feature film debut and starring Nandu and Priyanka Sharma.

== Cast ==
- Nandu as Raju
- Priyanka Sharma as Baaghi
- Shiva Kumar as Sandy
- Srikanth Reddy Ganta as Kaali

== Production ==
The film was announced to be a romantic comedy directed by newcomer Saahith Mothkuri. It was initially announced that Rashmi Gautam would star as the female lead and feature music by Prashanth R Vihari; however, these reports proved to be false. The film's main characters include a horse, Nandu, and Priyanka Sharma. Nandu portrayed a man from a slum in the film.

== Soundtrack ==
The songs were composed by Shekar Chandra. A single "Nee Kannulu" was released in October 2019. The song "Undipova Nuvvila" gained attention upon release.

Savaari

Soundtrack album by Shekar Chandra
- Released: 2020
- Genre: Feature film soundtrack
- Length: 19:18
- Language: Telugu
- Label: Aditya Music

Shekar Chandra chronology
118 (2019)	Savaari (2020)	Valayam (2020)
External audio
- Savaari – Video Jukebox on YouTube

Track listing
No.	Title	Lyrics	Singer(s)	Length
1.	"Nee Kannulu"	Kasarla Shyam	Rahul Sipligunj	2:57
2.	"Undipova"	Purna Chary	Spoorthi Jithender	3:51
3.	"Trip Song (Mathulo)"	Shekar Chandra	Shekar Chandra	3:39
4.	"Chey Savaari"	Ramanjaneyulu	Siddharth Watkins	3:47
5.	"Dheedhaar Rab Se"	Sriram Tapaswi	Kareemulla	3:48
6.	"Savaari"	Spoorthi Jithender	Spoorthi Jithender	1:16
Total length:				19:18

== Release and reception ==
The film was released on 7 February 2020. Film Companion wrote that "The biggest problem is that it just doesn’t know how to handle its drama". The Times of India gave the film a rating of two-and-half out of five and stated that "With the kind of set-up given and nothing exciting panning out, Savaari doesn’t leave you with a smile on your face".
