= Moscowin Kavery =

- Theatrical release poster
- Directed by: Ravi Varman
- Written by: Ravi Varman
- Produced by: D. Ramesh Babu
- Starring: Rahul; Samantha
- Cinematography: Ravi Varman
- Edited by: Anthony
- Music by: S. Thaman
- Production company: R Films
- Distributed by: Aascar Films
- Release date: 27 August 2010
- Running time: 120 minutes
- Country: India
- Language: Tamil

Moscowin Kavery (transl. Moscow's Kaveri) is a 2010 Indian Tamil-language romantic drama film written and directed by cinematographer Ravi Varman, making his directorial debut, besides handling the cinematography. The film, which has lyrics written by Vairamuthu and music scored by Thaman, stars debutante Rahul and Samantha in the titular roles with Y. G. Harsha, Manikandan and Santhanam playing supporting roles. The film was released on 27 August 2010, after nearly three years of production.

== Plot ==
Moscow and Kaveri are two IT professionals working in Chennai. Kaveri has abandoned her family in her hometown due to family disputes and the violence that followed. Moscow is an orphan who has ancestral properties in his native village. Both fall in love, buy a house and live together. Soon, they have differences of opinions and plan to part ways. Then comes Azhagan, a feared criminal on the police's wanted list. Azhagan comes across the couple's house and plans to murder them. But due to the timely intervention of the police, Azhagan is arrested and Moscow and Kaveri reunite. Kaveri also reconciles up with her estranged father and family members.

== Cast ==
- Rahul as Moscow
- Samantha as Kaveri Thangavelu (Voice dubbed by Renuka Kathir)
- Y. G. Harsha as Azhagan
- Manikandan as Moscow's friend
- Santhanam as Devaraj
- Bava Lakshmanan as Constable
- Suja as an item number in "Gramam Thedi Vaada"
- Kanal Kannan as Azhagan's right hand
- Cool Suresh as Passenger
- Seeman in a guest appearance
- K. Selva Bharathy as Kaveri's father
- Saravana Subbiah as Police inspector
- Rohini as Dance Teacher (Cameo appearance)

Uncredited

- Deepika Parthiban as Moscow's coworker
- Minnal Deepa as Mrs. Devaraj
- Rupa Manjari special appearance in the song "Gramam Thedi Vaada"
- Ravi Varman special appearance in the song "Gramam Thedi Vaada"
- Baba Bhaskar special appearance in the "Gramam Thedi Vaada"
- R. Parthiban as narrator

== Production ==
The film began production in 2007. It is the film debut of Rahul Ravindran. Ravi saw a modelling assignment of Samantha and quickly decided that she would be the heroine.

== Soundtrack ==
Film score and the soundtrack are composed by Thaman. Despite being Thaman's first Tamil assignment as a composer, several of his later films had released prior to Moscowin Kavery. The album was released in May 2009. The song "Gore Gore" was not entirely featured in the film. The tune of the song was reused in the 2009 Telugu film Kick.

All lyrics are written by Vairamuthu.

Track listing
| No. | Title | Singer(s) | Length |
|---|---|---|---|
| 1. | "Nee Ondrum Azhagi" | Naveen Madhav, Rahul Nambiar | 6:28 |
| 2. | "Then Muttham" | Naresh Iyer, Suchitra | 4:56 |
| 3. | "Adhigalai Pookal" | Vardhani, Shankar Mahadevan | 4:45 |
| 4. | "Gramam Thedi Vaada" | Tippu, Ranjith, Rita | 5:07 |
| 5. | "Gore Gore" | Karthik, Suchitra | 5:13 |
| 6. | "Aanum Pennum" | Malathy Lakshman, Sayanora Philip, Priya Himesh | 5:08 |
| Total length: | | | 31:37 |

== Critical reception ==
Pavithra Srinivasan from Rediff.com wrote that "Moscowin Kaveri looks good. But that's about all that can be said about it". Sify wrote, "It has no basic framework of cinema. The film is tackily executed and suffers from lack of a script, no cohesion between scenes making the viewers squirm in their seats". The film was also reviewed by Mythily Ramachandran for Nowrunning.
