= Margani Bharat =

Indian politician, actor (born 1982)

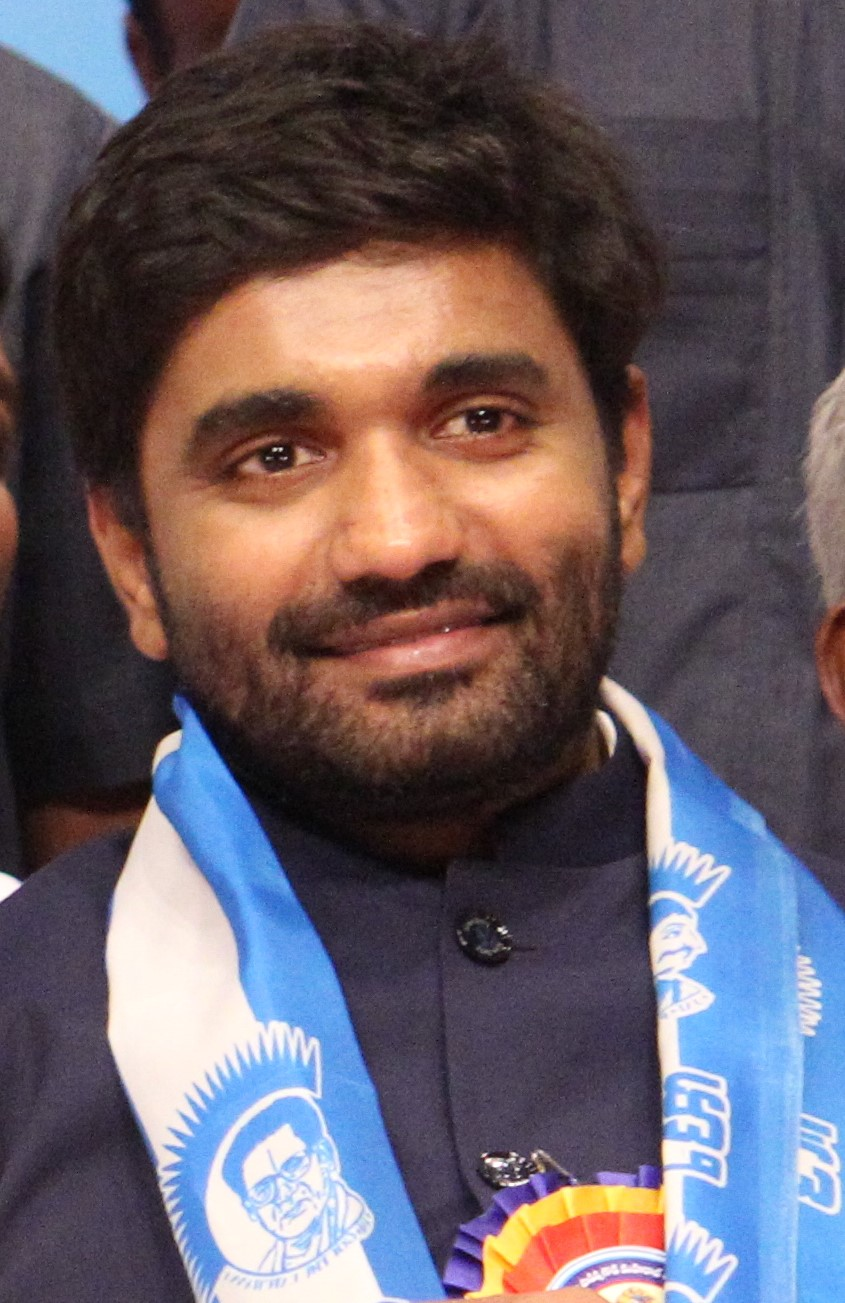

Member of the India Parliament for Rajahmundry
- In office 23 April 2019 – 04 June 2024
- Preceded by: Murali Mohan
- Succeeded by: Daggubati Purandeswari
- Constituency: Rajahmundry

Personal details
- Born: 12 May 1982 (age 44) Tirupati, Chittoor, Andhra Pradesh, India
- Party: YSR Congress Party
- Parents: Margani Nageswara Rao (father); Margani Prasuna (mother)
- Occupation: Politician; actor

Margani Bharat is an Indian politician and actor, previously served as a Member of Parliament to the 17th Lok Sabha from Rajahmundry Lok Sabha constituency, Andhra Pradesh. He is the YSR Congress Party Parliament party Chief Whip from 2019 to 2024.He won the 2019 Indian general election being a YSR Congress Party candidate. He contested as MLA from Rajahmundry City Assembly Constituency, Andhra Pradesh and Lost to Adireddy Srinivas from TDP.

== Political career ==
Bharat was involved in politics since his childhood, He became youth leader at a young age. After that he joined YSRCP party and became an MP with a majority of 1,21,634 votes against his nearest rival Telugu Desam Party (TDP) candidate Maganti Rupa.

== Filmography ==
He acted in a movie Oye Ninneafter discontinuing his study in America.

== Awards ==
- He Won Bharat Gaurav Award 2018-2019 for social service registered with Niti Ayog
- Govt. of India and won Bharat Youth Award for excellent services during Covid
