= Anubhavinchu Raja =

- Theatrical release poster
- Directed by: Sreenu Gavireddy
- Written by: Sreenu Gavireddy
- Produced by: Supriya Yarlagadda
- Starring: Raj Tarun; Kashish Khan; Ajay
- Cinematography: Nagesh Banell
- Edited by: Chota K. Prasad
- Music by: Gopi Sundar
- Production companies: Annapurna Studios; Sree Ventakeswara Cinemas
- Release date: 26 November 2021
- Running time: 131 minutes
- Country: India
- Language: Telugu
- Box office: ₹4.95 crore

Anubhavinchu Raja (transl. Experience it, Boy!) is a 2021 Indian Telugu-language romantic action comedy film written and directed by Sreenu Gavireddy and produced by Supriya Yarlagadda through Annapurna Studios and Sree Ventakeswara Cinemas. The film features Raj Tarun and Kashish Khan in lead roles. It was released on 26 November 2021, and grossed ₹4.95 crore (US$520,000) at the box office.

== Plot ==
Raju works as a security guard in idm company along with his friend where he learns that Raju a.k.a. King Kong Raju has hired goons to kill him. On asking about it, Raju reveals that after inheriting his grandfather's wealth at a young age, lives a lavish life and becomes the village's laughing stock. On a quest to prove himself worthy of respect, things go haywire, when he decides to become the sarpanch of the village.

== Cast ==
- Raj Tarun as Bangarraju 'Raju'/ "King Kong Raju", a security guard works in Hyderabad had a dark secret.
- Kashish Khan as Sruthi, an IT professional who works at a multinational corporation in Hyderabad
- Posani Krishna Murali
- Aadukalam Naren
- Ajay as Ammireddy
- Ravi Krishna as Rahul
- Sudharshan as Darshan, Raju’s colleague
- Temper Vamsi
- Aadarsh Balakrishna
- Ariyana Glory
- Chandoo Sai
- Bhupal Raju

== Soundtrack ==
All lyrics are written by Bhaskarabhatla; all music is composed by Gopi Sundar.

No.	Title	Singer(s)	Length
1.	"Anubhavinchu Raja"	Ram Miriyala	4:06
2.	"Neevalle Raa"	Ramya Behara	3:50
3.	"Bathike Haayiga"	Deepu	3:28
4.	"Kaki Nemali Ke Votu"	Roll Rida	2:10
Total length:			13:33

== Release ==
In late-October 2021, the release date of the film was announced as 26 November 2021.

== Reception ==
Thadhagath Pathi of The Times of India gave a rating of 2.5 out of 5 and wrote that "The songs by Gopi Sunder are catchy and few scenes even generate laughs. The film tries to be a moral lecture by showcasing the lifestyle of a young, rich guy from Godavari but the output is dull fare. Don’t expect too much if you’re watching it this weekend." Sangeetha Devi Dundoo of The Hindu opined that the film "has a sliver of a story and a messy screenplay, making it an ordeal to sit through". She felt that the lead actress's characterisation can be best described as a stereotypical "cute-but-dumb". A critic of Pinkvillarated the film 2/5 and wrote, "The film needed a zany hero, not a stock character. The comedy had to be self-deprecating, not indulgent. The film has a track where supari killers live as sleeper cells". NTV cited the film as a "below-average fare" and stated, "The commercial ingredients are half-hearted, especially because none of the situations feels refreshing. The final act is watchable because of the coming-of-age nature of the story".
