= Nanna Nenu Naa Boyfriends =

- Theaterical Release Poster
- Directed by: Bhaskar Bandi
- Written by: B. Sai Krishna
- Screenplay by: Prasanna Kumar Bezawada
- Produced by: Bekkam Venugopal; Manasa; Mahalakshmi
- Starring: Hebah Patel; Rao Ramesh; Tejaswi Madivada; Noel Sean; Ashwin Babu; Parvateesam
- Cinematography: Chota K. Naidu
- Edited by: Chota K. Prasad
- Music by: Shekar Chandra
- Production company: Lucky Media
- Distributed by: Sri Venkateswara Creations
- Release date: 16 December 2016
- Running time: 140 minutes
- Country: India
- Language: Telugu

Nanna Nenu Naa Boyfriends (transl. Father, Me and my boyfriends) is a 2016 Indian Telugu romantic comedy film directed by debutant Bhaskar Bandi and cinematography by Chota K. Naidu. Starring Rao Ramesh, Hebah Patel, Tejaswi Madivada, Ashwin Babu, Noel Sean and Parvateesam. Music by Sekhar Chandra. Screenplay and Dialogues by Prasanna Kumar Bezawada. Produced by Bekkam Venugopal under the banner Lucky Media Pvt Ltd and Distributed by Dil Raju under the banner Sri Venkateswara Creations. The film was released on 16 December 2016.

== Plot ==
The story is about Padmavati, a pampered girl who loves her father very much. But her father Raghava Rao is said by a prophesier that his daughter will leave him if he disagree to any of her wish. So Raghava Rao pampers her from her childhood. When she is grown up, her father makes her alliance fixed with a man, who jobs in America. Paddu declares that she will herself choose a guy to marry and if she fails in that, she will marry the guy chosen by her father.

She leaves to Hyderabad and stays with her friend Maggie. Paddu meets Namo, Nani and Gokul. She befriends the three at a time which irritates Maggie. She too proposes all of them when they propose her. Then Paddu decides to test them. Paddu with Maggie tests her boyfriends in which they pass. On Paddu's birthday, her boyfriends wish her and she escapes the hurdles again. Namo, Nani and Gokul get job offers. But Paddu asks them to sacrifice their job or leave her. They sacrifice their career for her. Then Paddu's mother overhears her friend and hers conversation and forces Paddu to leave the city.

Paddu gets saddened by this and her father watches her. He reveals to her he knew about her boyfriends earlier. He meets her boyfriends and tells that Paddu loved three of them at once. They tell him that they have sacrificed their job for her. Raghava Rao then reveals that he had given them jobs to make Paddu decide her bridegroom. He tells that if they do not come to her marriage, he will cancel it. They reach Paddu's village and meet Raju, Paddu's fiancé who saved her at her childhood. Paddu and Raju marry and live happily.

== Cast ==
- Rao Ramesh as Raghava Rao, Padmavati’s father
- Hebah Patel as Padmavati "Paddu", Raghava Rao's daughter
- Tejaswi Madivada as Maggie, Paddu's friend
- Noel Sean as Gokul
- Ashwin Babu as Nani
- Parvateesam as Narendra Mohan Sastri "Namo"
- Sana as Padmavati's mother
- Geethanjali Thasya as Frooti, Padmavati's servant
- Krishna Bhagavan as Station Master
- Thotapalli Madhu as Namo's father
- Dhanraj
- Chammak Chandra as Frooti's lover
- Shakalaka Shankar as Thief
- Jabardasth Ram Prasad
- Raj Tarun as Raju, Paddu's fiancé (cameo appearance)

== Soundtrack ==
Naanna Nenu Naa Boyfriends

Soundtrack album by Shekar Chandra
- Released: 7 December 2016
- Recorded: 2016
- Genre: Feature film soundtrack
- Length: 14:05
- Language: Telugu
- Label: Aditya Music
- Producer: Bekkam Venugopal

Shekar Chandra chronology
Ekkadiki Pothavu Chinnavada (2016)	Naanna Nenu Naa Boyfriends (2016)	Andhhagadu (2017)

The film's soundtrack was released on 7 December 2016. The soundtrack has 4 songs. The music is composed by Sekhar Chandra

Track listing
No.	Title	Lyrics	Singer(s)	Length
1.	"Boyfriend Kavali"	Bhashkarabhatla	Lipsika, Divya Diwakar	3:02
2.	"Waiting Iam Waiting"	Kasarala Shyam	Dhinakar	3:28
3.	"Oka Paru Mugguru Devadasulu"	Varikuppala Yadagiri	Malati	3:41
4.	"Mounama O Mounama"	Chandrabose	Prakash Parighosh	4:34
Total length:				14:05

== Reception ==
A critic from The Times of India rated the film 3/5 stars and wrote, "The convoluted, and often predictable, script is made a wee bit more tolerable by the good production quality".
