= Ramakrishnapur =

- Census Town
- Location in Telangana, India Ramakrishnapur (India)
- Coordinates: 19.071556°N 79.491173°E
- Country: India
- State: Telangana
- District: Mancherial

Area
  - Total: 13.28 km^{2} (5.13 sq mi)

Population (2011)
  - Total: 5,133
  - Density: 386.5/km^{2} (1,001/sq mi)

Languages
  - Official: Telugu
- Time zone: UTC+5:30 (IST)
- PIN: 504301
- Vehicle registration: TS 19
- Website: telangana.gov.in

Ramakrishnapur is a census town near Mandamarri mandal in (Mancherial District (Old Adilabad) of the Indian state of Telangana.
