= 3G Love =

Indian Telugu-language romantic drama film

- poster
- Directed by: Govardhan Krishna
- Written by: Govardhan Krishna
- Produced by: Pratap Kolagatla
- Starring: 26 newcomers
- Cinematography: Sriram
- Music by: Shekar Chandra
- Production company: Quareindia Studios
- Release date: 21 March 2013
- Country: India
- Language: Telugu

3G Love is a 2013 Indian Telugu-language romantic drama film directed by Govardhan Krishna, produced by Pratap Kolagatla and starring newcomers. The film is about the romantic relationships of the hi-tech generation. The film released on 15 March 2013.

== Cast ==
- Ashrith as Karthik
- Atul as Atul
- Avinash as Ram
- Ayush as Pavan
- Harsh as Akki
- Joshi Ram as Ankith
- Mahaveer as Ravi
- Mahendra as Sunil
- Mahesh as Naveen
- Sampath as Vinod
- Saketh as Varun
- Sandeep as Uday
- Sidharth Varma as Mahesh
- Surya as Lee
- Vamsi Yadla Rajesh as Suresh
- Padams Naveen as Ramesh
- Deborah as Durga
- Jyothi as Vivantha
- Neelima as Stella
- Nidhi as Vinamra
- Preeti as Pallavi
- Sravani as Shanti
- Swetha as Chinnu
- Vinnie as Linda
- Rao Ramesh as Shanti's father
- Prabhas Sreenu as a park broker

== Production ==
The film is produced by sQuareindia Group Managing Director Pratap Kolagatla. According to the director Govardhan Krishna, 3G Love means 3rd Generation love or 3rd Grade love and the three G's are girls, guys and greed.

The film features 26 debutants—15 male actors and 11 actresses. These actors were selected through auditions in Hyderabad and Vizag. 3G Love was shot in 51 days.

== Music ==
Music composed by Shekar Chandra.

Track listing
No.	Title	Lyrics	Singer(s)	Length
1.	"Edho Something"	Ramajogayya Sastry	Naresh Iyer	4:42
2.	"Ee Kala Ela"	Vanamali	Karthik	4:25
3.	"Search For Your Love"	Vanamali	Shekar Chandra, Deepu	4:13
4.	"Safety Konchem Kavali"	Ramajogayya Sastry	Sri Soumya, Deepti	2:53
5.	"The World is Full of Love"	Krishnageetha	Dinakar	2:16
6.	"I Wanna Be With You"	Shekhar Chandra	Shekar Chandra	1:16
Total length:				19:45

== Reception ==
Karthik Pasupulate from The Times of India opined that "It just seems like a bunch of adolescents who just discovered the joys of non-vegetarian jokes came together to write the dialogues. The sense of humor is with the lack of a better word, just too "hormonal". There really isn't any story". Jeevi of Idlebrain.com said that "On a whole, 3G Love is not a film: it's more like a debate and a case study with adult content thrown in". Mahesh S. Koneru of 123telugu stated that "This film is an assault on the intelligence of viewers. Bad writing, bad acting and a non-existent plot leave a very bad taste in the mouth". Shekhar Hooli of Filmibeat gave a positive review and said that "The movie 3G Love is a romance drama with lot of fun and comedy to lure the youth. The actors' performances, Venkatapathy's screenplay, dialogues and narration, Shekar Chandra's melodious music, Sai Sri Ram's cinematography and beautiful locales are the highlights of the movie."

== Box office ==
The film ran for 25 days.
