= Shekar Chandra =

Indian music composer

Shekhar Chandra
- Born
- Occupations: Music composer, Singer and Director
- Years active: 2008–present

Shekhar Chandra is an Indian music composer and singer known for his work in Telugu cinema. His debut film as music director was Anasuya (2007). He is considered as one of the most underrated music directors of Telugu film industry.

== Personal life and career ==
He is the son of Hari Anumolu, Director of photography, known for films like Ladies Tailor, Sri Kanaka Mahalakshmi Recording Dance Troupe, Nuvve Kavali, and Gamyam.

== Discography ==
=== As composer ===
Year	Telugu	Other languages
2007	Anasuya	Anu ♦ (Kannada)
2007	Gnapakam	
2008	Nachavule	Ooh La La La ♦ (Tamil)
2008	Manjeera	
2009	Amaravathi	
2010	Betting Bangaraju	
2010	Manasara	
2011	Nuvvila	
2012	Mem Vayasuku Vacham	
2012	Avunu	
2013	3G Love	
2013	Abbai Class Ammai Mass	
2013	Pelli Pustakam	
2014	Maaya	
2014	Boochamma Boochodu	
2014	Weekend Love	
2014	Karthikeya	
2014	Brother of Bommali	
2015	Avunu 2	
2015	Cinema Choopistha Mava	
2016	Marala Telupana Priya	
2016	Nandini Nursing Home	
2016	Ekkadiki Pothavu Chinnavada	
2016	Nanna Nenu Naa Boyfriends	
2017	Andhhagadu	
2017	Oye Ninne	
2018	Howrah Bridge	
2018	Parichayam	
2018	Subrahmanyapuram	
2019	118	
2019	Sivaranjani	
2020	Savaari	
2020	Valayam	
2021	Bro	
2022	Athidi Devo Bhava	
2022	Sammathame	
2022	Shikaru	
2022	Kotha Kothaga	
2023	Bhuvana Vijayam	
2024	Ambajipeta Marriage Band	
2024	Ooru Peru Bhairavakona	
2024	Bhale Unnade	
2024	Pottel	
2025	Pelli Kani Prasad	
2025	Show Time	
2025	Paanch Minar	

Notes

- ♦ indicates a remade version, the remaining ones being dubbed versions.
