= Howrah Bridge (2018 film) =

2018 film directed by Revan Yadhu

- Directed by: Revan Yadhu
- Produced by: EMVE Studios Pvt. Ltd
- Starring: Rahul Ravindran; Chandini Chowdary
- Cinematography: Prasad GK
- Edited by: Kotagiri Venkateswara Rao
- Music by: Shekar Chandra
- Production company: EMVE Studios
- Release date: 3 February 2018
- Running time: 129 minutes
- Country: India
- Language: Telugu

Howrah Bridge is a 2018 Indian Telugu-language romance film directed by Revan Yadhu. It stars Rahul Ravindran and Chandini Chowdary.

== Plot ==
Arjun (Rahul Ravindran) and Shruti "Sweety" (Manali Rathore) get in touch because of the Machavaram Bridge as children. Arjun, who cannot forget Sweety since then, considers her as his life partner. After 18 years, he comes to Machavaram in search of Sweety. There, he meets Swathi "Sweety" (Chandini Chaudhary), who works in software, decides to marry her brother-in-law Ajay (Ajay), who educated her and brought her up.

But, Arjun approaches her as his Sweety. Eventually Sweety also likes him. Meanwhile, Arjun gets to know the real sweety he saw as a child, Shruti. He then sends a video message to Swathi and leaves in search of Shruti. Meanwhile, Sweety tells her brother-in-law about her love affair with Arjun. After that, knowing that Arjun has moved away, she tries to commit suicide. And did Arjun and Shruti meet? Who was Sweety married to? is part the rest of the story.

== Cast ==
- Rahul Ravindran as Arjun
- Chandini Chowdary as Swathi "Sweety"
- Manali Rathod as Shruthi "Sweety"
- Rao Ramesh as Rao Ramesh
- Ajay as Ajay, Chandini's brother-in-law
- Posani Krishna Murali
- Ali
- Vidyullekha Raman as Saroja, Sweety's friend
- Madhunandan

== Reception ==
The Hans India criticized the double meaning dialogue and the chemistry between the lead artistes.
