= Raj Tarun =

Indian actor (born 1992)

- Born: 11 May 1992 (age 34); Visakhapatnam, Andhra Pradesh, India
- Occupation: Actor
- Years active: 2013–present

Raj Tarun (born 11 May 1992) is an Indian actor who works in Telugu films. Tarun debuted with Uyyala Jampala (2013) for which won SIIMA Award for Best Male Debut – Telugu.

He has appeared in many successful films including Cinema Choopistha Mava, Kumari 21F, Eedo Rakam Aado Rakam, Andhhagadu, Lover, Kittu Unnadu Jagratha and Iddari Lokam Okate.

== Early life and career ==
Raj Tarun was born in Prahaladapuram, Visakhapatnam, India. He has acted in 52 short films, and dreamt of becoming a film director. He also worked on the screenplay and dialogues for his first film Uyyala Jampala. He won the Best Debutant Actor award at the South Indian International Movie Awards in 2014, for Uyyala Jampala.

In 2015, he acted in Cinema Choopistha Mava and Kumari 21F, and received praise for his performances. He has appeared in many successful films including Kumari 21F, Eedo Rakam Aado Rakam, Andhhagadu, Lover, Kittu Unnadu Jagratha and Iddari Lokam Okate.

In 2021, he played the lead in Anubhavinchu Raja. In 2022, he appeared in Stand Up Rahul.

His next film, Paanch Minar, directed by Ramesh Kadumula, was launched in 2024 where he stars alongside Rashi Singh.

== Filmography ==
Key
| † | Denotes films that have not yet been released |

- All films are in Telugu, unless otherwise noted.

| Year | Title | Role | Notes | Ref. |
|---|---|---|---|---|
| 2013 | Uyyala Jampala | Suri | Also screenwriter; SIIMA Award for Best Male Debut – Telugu | |
| 2015 | Cinema Choopistha Mava | Kaththi | | |
| 2015 | Kumari 21F | Siddhu | | |
| 2016 | Seethamma Andalu Ramayya Sitralu | Sri Ram | | |
| 2016 | Eedo Rakam Aado Rakam | Ashwin | | |
| 2016 | Majnu | Hemanth | Cameo appearance | |
| 2016 | Naanna Nenu Naa Boyfriends | Raju | Cameo appearance | |
| 2017 | Kittu Unnadu Jagratha | Kittu | Also lyricist for "Johny Johny Yes Papa" | |
| 2017 | Andhhagadu | Gowtham | | |
| 2017 | Balloon | Jeevanandham | Tamil film; cameo appearance | |
| 2018 | Rangula Ratnam | Vishnu | Also lyricist for "Prema Prema" | |
| 2018 | Raju Gadu | Raju | | |
| 2018 | Lover | Raj | | |
| 2019 | Iddari Lokam Okate | Mahi | | |
| 2020 | Orey Bujjiga | Bujji | | |
| 2021 | Power Play | Vijay | | |
| 2021 | Anubhavinchu Raja | Bangarraju | | |
| 2022 | Stand Up Rahul | Rahul | | |
| 2023 | Manu Charitra | Ronson Joseph | Cameo appearance | |
| 2024 | Naa Saami Ranga | Bhaskar | | |
| 2024 | Purushothamudu | Rachit Ram | | |
| 2024 | Tiragabadara Saami | Giri | | |
| 2024 | Bhale Unnade | Radha | | |
| 2025 | Chiranjeeva | Siva | | |
| 2025 | Paanch Minar | Krishna Chaitanya | | |

=== Television ===
| Year | Title | Role | Channel | Notes |
|---|---|---|---|---|
| 2022 | Aha Naa Pellanta | Seenu | ZEE5 | |
