= Pelli Pustakam (2013 film) =

- Poster
- Directed by: Ramakrishna Machakanti
- Produced by: B Nagireddy; BV Gopal; P Suman
- Starring: Rahul Ravindran; Niti Taylor
- Music by: Shekar Chandra
- Production company: Lakshmi Narasimha Cine Visions
- Release date: 12 July 2013
- Running time: 145 min
- Country: India
- Language: Telugu

Pelli Pustakam (transl. Marriage book) is a 2013 Indian Telugu language film that was directed by Ramakrishna Machakanti. The movie released on 12 July 2013 and stars Rahul Ravindran and Niti Taylor in the main roles. This movie is an unofficial remake of the Korean film My Little Bride which was released in 2004.

== Plot ==
Rahul and Niti are cousins that have known each other since childhood. They see each other as friends, which is why they're both surprised to discover that their grandfather has arranged for the two of them to get married. The two are married, but Niti is unhappy in the marriage and tells her new husband that she has only married him to make Satyam happy. She keeps their marriage a secret and falls in love with a basketball player at her university. Rahul soon discovers this after Niti is seen cheering for her boyfriend at a game, but is determined to win over his wife's heart. Niti eventually finds that her relationship with her boyfriend is just an infatuation and discovers that she returns her husband's feelings.

== Cast ==
- Rahul Ravindran as Rahul
- Niti Taylor as Niti
- Nagineedu as Satyam
- Taraka Srinivas
- Nagi Reddy Busipally (producer)
- Y. Kasi Viswanath

== Reception ==
Critical reception for Pelli Pustakam has been predominantly negative. The Times of India rated the movie at two stars and heavily criticized it, as they felt that it promoted consanguineous marriages. The Hindu also panned the movie, stating that the film "had all the pre requisites to be a decent hit and for the ‘family audience’ the director adulterates the smooth going story with unpalatable scenes and unnecessary characters after a point and makes the viewer restless even as the film is seemingly headed for a routine but a decent message."
