= Mad Square =

Indian comedy drama film

- Theatrical release poster
- Directed by: Kalyan Shankar
- Written by: Kalyan Shankar
- Produced by: Naga Vamsi
- Starring: Narne Nithiin; Sangeeth Sobhan; Ram Nitin; Priyanka Jawalkar; Vishnu Oi
- Cinematography: Shamdat
- Edited by: Naveen Nooli
- Music by: Score; Thaman S Songs; Bheems Ceciroleo
- Production companies: Sithara Entertainments; Fortune Four Cinemas; Srikara Studios
- Release date: 28 March 2025
- Running time: 127 minutes
- Country: India
- Language: Telugu

Mad Square (stylized as (MAD)²) is a 2025 Indian Telugu-language action comedy film written and directed by Kalyan Shankar and produced by Naga Vamsi. A sequel to the 2023 film Mad, the film has an ensemble cast of Narne Nithiin, Sangeeth Sobhan, Ram Nitin, Priyanka Jawalkar and Vishnu Oi.

The film was released on 28 March 2025 to positive reviews from critics.

== Plot ==
4 years after the events of the first film (Note: Following the events of Mad (2023).), Ganesh "Laddu" is in jail. 6 students seeing how powerful Laddu is, go to ask him the reason why he is in jail, Laddu narrates the incidents that happened 3 months ago. DD is contesting for the Sarpanch position, Ashok is fighting for his property against his paternal aunt mother while Manoj works as a bartender recovering from his breakup with Sruthi. Laddu is getting married and all 3 including Shiva come to the marriage. However, Laddu's fiancé Pooja elopes with another guy and while Laddu is about to commit suicide, Ashok stops Laddu and suggests that the group goes to Goa on vacation. All 5 go to Goa and enjoy their time in Goa with Laddu finding a potential new girlfriend. Laddu's mom is concerned about her son and asks Laddu's father to check on him. He enters Goa and finds out that Laddu is enjoying with a woman and questions Laddu about his bad habits. All the 5 boys promise on Laddu's father that there's nothing of that sort. Maxx enters the resort and abducts all the 6 people and take them to his location.

All 6 of them kneel down in front of Maxx. He reveals to these 6 people that he was the one who assigned a deal to 2 guys that he shot, to steal the necklace from the museum and also tells his people to put cash in one car and the necklace in another. He asks those guys to select the most happening island which is 'Honeymoon Island' and exchange the valets. But the car with the necklace goes missing. Maxx blames the boys for killing those 2 guys for no reason. Shiva suggests Maxx to kidnap Laddu's father and give them 2 days to find the necklace. Maxx, who does the opposite of what is supposed to do, follows Shiva's suggestion and keeps Laddu's father for 2 days and leave those 5 boys to find the necklace. First, Purushottham kicks out all of them from their resort as they are the reason all the customers left the resort. They realize that Laila has the necklace and goes out to find her. Manoj calls Laila's manager and asks for Laila's location. They go to the prostitute center, dressed as policemen to find Laila but accidentally finds Subhalekha and CI Sebastian. They escape from the center but get caught by the police for wearing police uniform. CI Sebastian takes them to the station. On the other hand, the DGP gets the information that the 5 boys are responsible for stealing necklace at the museum. These 5 boys escape from the police station and runs for their lives where they get saved by a jeep who happens to be Anthony Rodriguez, their senior at their college. Anthony asks all his boys to find Laila. He takes them to a mental hospital and tells his past that his father worked as a doctor in this hospital. He tells the boys to get ready to party where they find Laila, who happens to be the girlfriend of Anudeep. Laddu tells DD that he gave the necklace to Laila. She returns the necklace to Laddu. DGP Vikram tells Maxx that CBI is in Goa to catch him, not the necklace. The boys along with Anthony are taken to Maxx's place. Manoj fools Maxx to leave them by telling what Maxx does, which is precisely the opposite. Manoj mistakenly says Maxx to 'leave them'. DGP tells Subhalekha that one of them is from the CBI.

Maxx points out the gun at Anthony but he says that he didn't clear his engineering exams. DD asks who is from CBI and realizes that it's Ashok. Ashok passed IPS and becomes an undercover officer. He overpowers all of Maxx's men and gets Maxx and Subhalekha arrested. Maxx's brother-in-law is furious at Laddu for being responsible for Maxx's arrest and attacks Laddu's house. That's the reason why Laddu is in Jail under the Witness Protection Program.

Laddu calls Ashok and asks him to consider bringing him out of jail. But Ashok tells him that he already caught those 3 people who were responsible for attack at Laddu's house and that he forgot to get Laddu out of jail.

== Cast ==
- Narne Nithiin as Ashok
- Sangeeth Sobhan as Damodhar "DD"
- Ram Nitin as Manoj
- Priyanka Jawalkar as Laila (cameo appearance)
- Vishnu Oi as Ganesh "Laddu"
- Karthikeya Samala as Shiva
- Brahmanandam as Prabhakar
- Sunil as Maxx
- Subhalekha Sudhakar as Subhalekha Sudhakar
- Krishna Bhagavan as Judge (cameo appearance)
- Raghu Babu as Principal Purushottam
- Satyam Rajesh as CI Sebastian
- Muralidhar Goud as Ganesh "Laddu"'s father
- Sameer as Lawyer
- Prabhas Sreenu as Bar Owner
- Ravi Anthony Pudota as Anthony Rodriguez
- Anish Kuruvilla as DGP Vikram Saheb
- K. V. Anudeep as Anudeep (cameo appearance)
- Sri Gouri Priya as Sruthi (cameo appearance)
- Rohan Roy
- Auto Ramprasad
- Ramya Pasupuleti as Pooja
- Krishna Kamal
- Reba Monica John as an item girl in the song "Swathi Reddy"

== Production ==
The film began production in April 2024.

== Soundtrack ==
The soundtrack is composed by Bheems Ceciroleo.

Track listing
No.	Title	Lyrics	Singer(s)	Length
1.	"Laddu Gaani Pelli"	Kasarla Shyam	Bheems Ceciroleo, Mangli	3:43
2.	"Swathi Reddy"	Suresh Gangula	Bheems Ceciroleo, Swathi Reddy UK	3:29
3.	"Vaccharroi"	K. V. Anudeep	Bheems Ceciroleo	3:00

== Reception ==
=== Critical reception ===
Sashidhar Adivi of Times Now rated the film three out of five stars and wrote, "If you’ve been yearning for slapstick comedy, this film is for you. Although films like Mad Square doesn’t come with a strong storyline the writing and the slapstick comedy makes it a time pass watch." A critic from The Hans India gave it three out of five stars and wrote, "Overall, MAD Square is a fun-filled entertainer that provides plenty of laughs and enjoyable performances. While it may not surpass its predecessor, it still guarantees a lighthearted and engaging cinematic experience."

T. Maruthi Acharya of India Today gave it two-and-a-half out of five stars and wrote, "Mad Square delivers moments of laughter but falls short of Mad. While Vishnu Oi’s performance and some well-executed comedy blocks keep it afloat, weak character arcs and an uneven second half hold it back. It is worth a watch but lacks the magic of the original." Sangeetha Devi Dundoo of The Hindu wrote, "The ‘MAD’ trio returns in a new setting and the result is a patchy absurd comedy. A few segments bring the house down while the rest fizzles".

Balakrishna Ganeshan of The News Minute wrote, "With weak character arcs, a pointless heist subplot, and jokes that fail to land, this sequel to ‘MAD’ proves that not every film needs a franchise." Aditya Devulapally of Cinema Express rated the film two-and-a-half out of five stars and wrote, "The sequel to MAD tries to recreate the same irreverent charm, but when the formula becomes familiar, the unpredictability starts to wear thin".

=== Box office ===
On its opening day, the film has collected ₹16 crore worldwide. It concluded its theatrical run with worldwide gross estimated to be ₹66 crore.
