= Kudumbasthan =

2025 Tamil film by Rajeshwar Kalisamy

- Theatrical release poster
- Directed by: Rajeshwar Kalisamy
- Written by: Rajeshwar Kalisamy; Prasanna Balachandran
- Produced by: S. Vinoth Kumar
- Starring: K. Manikandan; Saanve Megghana; Guru Somasundaram; Nivedita Rajappan
- Cinematography: Sujith N. Subramaniam
- Edited by: Kannan Balu
- Music by: Vaisagh
- Production company: Cinemakaaran
- Distributed by: L.Devadharshan
- Release date: 24 January 2025
- Running time: 155 minutes
- Country: India
- Language: Tamil
- Budget: ₹8 crore
- Box office: est. ₹25 crore

Kudumbasthan (transl. Family man) is a 2025 Indian Tamil-language comedy drama film directed by Rajeshwar Kalisamy (in his directorial debut) and co-written by Prasanna Balachandran. The film stars K. Manikandan and Saanve Megghana, alongside R. Sundarrajan, Guru Somasundaram, Kudassanad Kanakam, and Nivedita Rajappan in important roles. The film's music was composed by Vaisagh.

Kudumbasthan released on 24 January 2025 in theaters to positive reviews from critics. It is one of the highest-grossing Tamil film of 2025.

== Plot ==
Naveen and his wife, Vennila "Nila", were in love since college. Due to opposition from parents on both sides, they had register-married a year ago, are now expecting a child and live in Coimbatore with Naveen's parents. Naveen's overly caste-conscious mother chides Naveen for marrying Vennila who belongs to Scheduled Caste, while Naveen's father often brings up new expenses. Having been disowned by Vennila's family, Naveen is the family's sole breadwinner. He promises his father, Palanisamy, that he will renovate their house, assures his mother, Subbulakshmi to fund her all-India religious trip, and vows to support Vennila in preparing for the UPSC examination. Naveen, a designer at an advertising agency, loses his job along with his friend Simson after a confrontation with their client, Manikchand. Fearful of facing humiliation in front of his brother-in-law, engineer Rajendran - an eccentric, taunting and miserly individual who often mocks Naveen for being a loser - Naveen keeps his job loss a secret from his family. Naveen begins searching for a new job, while Simson helps Naveen secure a Rs. 20,000 loan through a mobile app, but quickly closes the loan with his friends' help, just before the family discovers the truth.

Rajendran requests a meeting with Naveen's boss for a business deal. Desperate to conceal his job loss, Naveen convinces his former colleague, Bagyaraj, to impersonate their manager. To maintain the charade, Naveen arranges for a Rs. 1 lakh loan from a local moneylender, sacrificing his old car as collateral. Unfortunately, the job he was anticipating also falls through. Palanichamy's astrologer advices to celebrate Palanichamy's 60th marriage to restore their family's prosperity. Naveen shifts the expenses to Rajendran. However, Rajendran discovers Naveen's job loss and publicly humiliates him by exposing the truth to his family. To help Naveen establish a business, Subbulakshmi arranges for a bakery space on lease through her relative, Ponnusamy. Naveen borrows from another money-lender and sets up his bakery. However, a more established bakery soon opens nearby, slowing down Naveen's business and making it challenging for him to pay the lease. Meanwhile, Vennila clears her UPSC prelims exam. Naveen's attempts to revamp his bakery leads to further debt accumulation. Rajendran mocks Naveen's struggles, suggesting he should have apologized to his former employer.

Naveen's debtors unite and attack him for failing to pay interest. Ponnusamy intervenes, making Naveen's debtors witnesses to repay the lease, totaling Rs. 3,15,000 to be repaid within 15 days. Palanisamy's friends propose a real estate deal offering a commission of Rs. 3,50,000. Naveen and Simson rush to meet a two-wheeler puncture shop person who was willing to sell his land. On the 14th day, Naveen evades Ponnusamy and other debtors, meeting the Singapore land buyer and provides the necessary documents. The buyer accepts the deal but refuses to pay the agreed-upon commission of Rs. 3.5 lakhs, offering only Rs. 1 lakh instead. Naveen rejects the offer and returns the money, angering his parents. Meanwhile, Rajendran prepares to relocate to Shanghai, for an upcoming project. He pretends to learn Chinese and adopts Chinese habits, irritating his wife, Anitha. She even plans to file for divorce due to Rajendran's tormenting behavior. However, the project gets assigned to someone else, and Rajendran is asked to apologize for his outburst in a meeting. But, Rajendran quits his job instead of apologizing due to his ego; however, at home, he breaks down in tears in front of Anitha, causing her to reconsider her divorce plans.

Ponnusamy evicts Naveen from the leased property, but he receives a call from his former boss, Mohan Ram, offering him his old job back, courtesy of Vennila's recommendation. Naveen confronts Vennila for arranging the job, leading to an argument and making Vennila express regret over marrying him. Setting aside his self-respect, Naveen apologizes to Manikchand and reluctantly rejoins the job. Naveen begins clearing his debts and meeting his commitments to his father, mother, and wife. However, Vennila's words continue to haunt him, and he contemplates moving alone to Qatar, fearing he won't be able to provide for his family's future needs. When his family discovers his plans, Naveen asserts that he's leaving, as they only respected him when he was employed. During the argument, Vennila experiences labor pains, and they rush to the hospital in Naveen's old car. En route, Vennila clears up misunderstandings about her in-laws' behavior toward her, and Anitha argues over Rajendran's dominating behavior.

Vennila gives birth to a baby girl and she confesses that Naveen is a hero. She asks him to stay with her, and Naveen agrees. Finally, Vennila's parents reunite with Naveen's family, Rajendran reforms himself and apologizes to Anitha and Palanisamy resolves his differences with his wife.

== Cast ==
- K. Manikandan as Naveen Palanisamy
- Saanve Megghana as Vennila "Nila" (Voice dubbed by Swetha Sivaselvi)
- R. Sundarrajan as Palanisamy, Naveen and Anitha's father
- Kudassanad Kanakam as Subbulakshmi, Naveen and Anitha's mother
- Nivedita Rajappan as Anitha
- Guru Somasundaram as Rajendran
- Saanvika Shree as Rajendran and Anitha's daughter
- Muthamizh as Simson
- Prasanna Balachandran as Manokaran
- Jenson Dhivakar as Ameer
- Aniruth as Kutty Thambi
- Balaji Sakthivel as Mohan Ram
- Abilash as Manikchand
- TSR Srinivasan as Thangamalai, Registrar
- Gaayathri Krishnan as a house owner
- Mathew Varghese as Rajendran's MD
- Nakkalites Aadhan Kumar as Bagyaraj, Naveen's colleague
- Nakkalites Manickam as Ponnusamy
- Dev as Kongu Siva
- Vijaya Raj as Singapooran
- Kannappa Dasan as Kumar
- John Wesley as Jayaraj Annachi
- Edward Raj as Annachi
- Syed Basha as Moosa Bhai
- Kaleeswaran as Seval Murugesh
- Nakkalites Dinesh as Guberan loans executive
- Nakkalites Ramkumar as Naalai Namathe, an astrologer
- Amar Ramesh as Rajendran's colleague
- Uriyadi Suruli as Bullet Mani, a moneylender
- Rajeshwar Kalisamy as a Škoda Superb car owner (cameo appearance)
- Radhika Sarathkumar (Photo appearance in an advertisement, Naveen's design)

Additionally, Nakkalites artists - Savithiri, Meena, Saratha Balan, Neela, Aishwarya, Thilagavathy, Ranjith, Sundhararajan, Gopinathan, Neel Magizhan were featured as relatives; Baby, Chandrika, Shanthi, Rudhra Moorthi, Prakash, Amar, Hari Krishnan were featured as neighbours.

== Production ==
=== Development ===
After completing the shooting for the film Lover (2024) by the end of November 2023, actor K. Manikandan joined hands with the debutant director Rajeshwar Kalisamy for his next project which was tentatively titled Manikandan's Next. Nakkalites fame Rajeshwar had cowritten this comedy-adventure family entertainer script along with Nakkalites co-founder and actor Prasanna Balachandran. The films marks the debut of Telugu actress Saanve Meghana as the female lead alongside Guru Somasundaram playing an important role. The film also features R. Sundarrajan, Nakkalites artists Nivedita Rajappan, Dhanam, Lubber Pandhu (2024) fame Jenson Dhivakar in supporting roles. The film is bankrolled by S. Vinoth Kumar under Cinemakaaran banner, with Vaisagh as the music composer, Kannan Balu as editor and Sujith N. Subramaniam as the cinematographer.

=== Filming ===
Principal photography began on 18 December 2023 in areas around Coimbatore in a single schedule. The entire shooting was wrapped on 30 March 2024.

=== Marketing ===
On 28 September 2024, actor Silambarasan revealed the title reveal poster, with the film titled Kudumbasthan showing multiple reactions of Manikandan doing household chores. On the occasion of the lead actor's birthday, on 29 September 2024, a poster of him with an innocent expression holding a heart-shaped balloon was released. On 18 January 2025, after a pre-release event, a 2.15 minute long trailer was released garnering positive response.

== Music ==
Kudumbasthan

Soundtrack album by Vaisagh
- Released: January 24, 2025
- Genre: Feature film soundtrack
- Length: 11:41
- Language: Tamil
- Label: Think Music
- Producer: Vaisagh

Singles from Kudumbasthan
- 1. "Zero Balance Hero" Released: 13 December 2024; 2. "Kanna Kattikittu" Released: 15 January 2025

External audio
- Kudumbasthan - Jukebox on YouTube

The soundtrack and background is composed by Vaisagh. The first single "Zero Balance Hero" released on 13 December 2024. The second single "Kanna Kattikittu" released on 15 January 2025. The promo song "Kaathu Namma Pakkam" released on 21 January 2025.

Track listing
No.	Title	Lyrics	Singer(s)	Length
1.	"Kanna Kattikittu"	Vaisagh	G. V. Prakash Kumar	3:07
2.	"Zero Balance Hero"	Vaisagh	Sean Roldan	3:22
3.	"Kaathu Namma Pakkam"	Vaisagh	Vaisagh, A-Gan	2:11
4.	"Ularal"	Mohan Rajan	Ravi G	3:01
Total length:				11:41

== Release ==
=== Theatrical ===
Kudumbasthan released in theatres on 24 January 2025. The film was certified 'U' by the Central Board of Film Certification.

=== Home media ===
The digital streaming rights were acquired by ZEE5, where it began streaming from 7 March 2025, streaming in Tamil, Telugu, Malayalam, Kannada, and Hindi.

== Reception ==
=== Critical response ===
Abhinav Subramanian of The Times of India gave 3.5/5 stars and wrote "For all its detours, Kudumbasthan works best when it sticks to basics — much like its protagonist, who discovers that family and honest work trump any get-rich-quick scheme. The film lands enough of its punchlines to keep the laughs coming." Anusha Sundar of OTTPlay gave 3.5/5 stars and wrote "Kudumbasthan feels like that one film that not only caters to audiences of all age groups but also makes you feel strongly that Tamil cinema has managed to open its account for 2025." Janani K of India Today gave 3.5/5 stars and wrote "Director Rajeshwar Kalisamy's Kudumbasthan manages to do just that and brings in the much-needed laughs while bringing to life our everyday problems. These days, it's rare to see a harmless comedy that also makes you think."

Avinash Ramachandran of The Indian Express gave 3/5 stars and wrote "Kudumbasthan reminded us about how it’s all about loving the family, and all about loving the parents, even if it means foregoing the idea of the self. At that point, Kudumbasthan wasn’t a comedy film that meanders… it became a horror film that hits the target effectively." Jayabhuvaneshwari B of Cinema Express gave 3/5 stars and wrote "In a cinematic landscape saturated with violent and traumatic narratives, Tamil cinema desperately needed the respite that Kudumbasthan offers." A critic of Dinamalar gave 2.75/5 stars. Kirubhakar Purushothaman of News18 gave 2.5/5 stars and wrote "Ultimately, Kudumbasthan sacrifices narrative coherence for humour at every opportunity. The film attempts to balance comedy with serious themes like caste discrimination but handles them with an uneven, lighthearted approach."

Gopinath Rajendran of The Hindu wrote "Kudumbasthan, much like most families out there, has its flaws and shortcomings. But similar to a mother’s hand-fed affection or a father’s care-laden motivation talks, the film comes as a tender affirmation that Tamil cinema has more to offer than just action and violence." Baradwaj Rangan wrote for Galatta Plus, "Director Rajeshwar Kalisamy has a good eye for filmmaking. Kudumbasthan is fast-paced, but this is not due to lazy, fragmented cutting. The writing, the staging, the dynamic photography by Sujith Subramaniam and editing by Kannan Balu, all combine to make the movie move like a bullet...the film has energy, a solid plot, solid performances… What it doesn’t have is tonal consistency. The premise is more suited to drama, but the director wants to entertain us throughout with one-liners and situational humour".
