= Vishnu Oi =

Indian actor

- Born: Hyderabad, Telangana, India
- Occupation: Actor
- Years active: 2018–present

Vishnu Oi is an Indian actor who works in Telugu Cinema. He debuted as an actor in the 2018 film, Taxiwaala. He is well known for his roles in Mad, Mad Square and Keedaa Cola.

== Career ==
Vishnu made his acting debut in Tharun Bhascker's short film, Sainma and later made his feature film debut with Rahul Sankrityan's Taxiwaala, playing the character 'Hollywood'.

He played various comedic roles in films such as Mad, Mad Square, Keedaa Cola and Saripodhaa Sanivaaram.

=== Filmography ===
Year	Name	Role(s)	Notes	Ref.
2018	Taxiwaala	Hollywood	Debut Film	
2019	Ninu Veedani Needanu Nene	Student		
2019	Kousalya Krishnamurthy			
2020	World Famous Lover	Yaadi		
2021	Skylab	Seenu		
2023	Ramanna Youth	Suresh		
2023	Mad	Laddu		
2023	Keedaa Cola	Sikandar		
2023	Kota Bommali PS	Raja Rao		
2024	Happy Ending	Verma		
2024	Saripodhaa Sanivaaram			
2024	Maa Nanna Superhero	Sikandar		
2024	Darling			
2025	Mad Square	Laddu		
2025	Uppu Kappurambu	Mike Man		
2025	Mithra Mandali			
2025	Patang			
2026	Suyodhana			
2026	Gaayapadda Simham			
2026	Raja the Raja			
2026	Baa Baa Black Sheep			

== Awards and Nominations ==
Awards	Year	Category	Film	Result	Ref.
Filmfare Awards South	2024	Best Supporting Actor - Telugu	Keeda Cola	Nominated	
South Indian International Movie Awards	2024	Best Comedian - Telugu	Mad	Won	
