= Modern Love Chennai =

2023 Indian anthology television series

- Official poster
- Genre: Romance; Drama; Anthology
- Based on: Modern Love by John Carney
- Written by: Balaji Tharaneetharan; Raju Murugan; Reshma Ghatala; Pratheep Kumar S; Thiagarajan Kumararaja
- Directed by: Bharathiraja; Balaji Sakthivel; Thiagarajan Kumararaja; Raju Murugan; Krishnakumar Ramakumar; Akshay Sundher
- Starring: Ritu Varma; Sri Gouri Priya; Wamiqa Gabbi; Ashok Selvan; Ramya Nambeesan; Sanjula Sarathi; Vasundhara Kashyap; Vijayalakshmi Feroz; Kishore
- Opening theme: "Yaayum Gnaayum" by Yuvan Shankar Raja
- Composers: Ilaiyaraaja; Yuvan Shankar Raja; G. V. Prakash Kumar; Sean Roldan
- Country of origin: India
- Original language: Tamil
- No. of seasons: 1
- No. of episodes: 6

Production
- Executive producer: Thiagarajan Kumararaja
- Producers: Tyler Durden; Kino Fist
- Production location: Chennai
- Cinematography: Nirav Shah; Jeeva Shankar; Vikas Vasudevan
- Running time: 38–69 minutes
- Production companies: Tyler Durden and Kino Fist; Amazon Studios; The New York Times Company

Original release
- Network: Amazon Prime Video
- Release: 18 May 2023

Modern Love Chennai is a 2023 Indian Tamil-language romantic anthology television series directed by Bharathiraja, Balaji Sakthivel, Thiagarajan Kumararaja, Raju Murugan, Krishnakumar Ramakumar and Akshay Sundher. It was produced by Tyler Durden and Kino Fist. It has ensemble cast including Ritu Varma, Sri Gouri Priya, Wamiqa Gabbi, Ashok Selvan, Ramya Nambeesan, Sanjula Sarathi, Vasundhara Kashyap, Vijayalakshmi Feroz, Kishore and others.

== Premise ==
Modern Love Chennai is the Chennai chapter based on the American anthology series Modern Love and published by The New York Times. It streamed on Amazon Prime Video on 18 May 2023.

== Cast ==
Lalagunda Bommaigal	Imaigal	Kaadhal Enbadhu Kannula Heart Irukkura Emoji
Sri Gouri Priya as Shoba; Vasundhara Kashyap as Vaijayanti; Vasudevan Murali as Nathuram; R Prasanna Ram Kumar as Soothsayer, later Shoba's husband; Bakkiyam Sankar as Shoba's uncle; Noble James as YouTuber Foodie; Sundarayyer as Shoba's father; Parveen as Nathuram's assistant girl; Sumitra as Nathuram's wife	Ashok Selvan as Nithyanandham; T. J. Bhanu as Devi; V. Yuvashree as Baby Tharani; Baby Aazhiya as Tharani (6 years); H. Dikshita as Tharani; Rethika Srinivas as Devi's mother; Skanda Priya Thota as Doctor; Manjula as Devi's colleague	Ritu Varma as Mallika; Samyuktha Viswanathan as Roja; Pawan Alex as KK, Mallika's college crush; Aniruth Kanakarajan as school crush; Agilan Pushparaj as Anbu, office crush; Ajay Melvin as Rajashekhar, Mallika's cousin; Vaibhav as Mallika's husband; Baradwaj Rangan as himself; Akshaya Hariharan as Akshaya; Ravi Bhat as Mallika's father; Sujatha Babu as Mallika's mother
Margazhi	Paravai Kootil Vaazhum Maangal	Ninaivo Oru Paravai
Sanjula Sarathi as Jazmine; Chu Khoy Sheng as Milton; Srikrishna Dayal as Jaiseelan, Jazmine's father; Arul D. Shankar as Priest; Krithika N as Rachel, Jazmine's friend; Arun as Rachel's boyfriend; Cheryl Jean Rose as Milton's grandmother	Kishore as Ravi; Remya Nambeesan as Revathi; Vijayalakshmi as Rohini; Delhi Ganesh as Ravi's father; Abdool as Ravi's neighbor	Wamiqa Gabbi as Sam; PB as K; Monisha Blessy as Shru; Ramkumar Ganesan as Doctor; Mallika as Fortune Teller

== Episodes ==
The first season of the series has six episodes.

Series	Episodes	Originally released
1	6	18 May 2023

=== Season 1 (2023) ===
No.	Title	Directed by	Written by	Original release date
1	"Lalagunda Bommaigal (transl. The Dolls of Lalagunda)"	Raju Murugan	Raju Murugan	18 May 2023
Despite the rules of their area Lalagunda, Shoba (Sri Gouri Priya) is ready to marry Nathuram (Vasudevan Murali) as predicted by a soothsayer (Prasanna Ram Kumar). Before the marriage, she finds that he had cheated her. She ends up wedding the soothsayer out of sheer coincidence. When Shoba meets Nathuram accidentally at a shop, both of them pretend they never met.
2	"Imaigal (transl. Eyelids)"	Balaji Sakthivel	Balaji Tharaneetharan	18 May 2023
Devi (T. J. Bhanu) and Nithyanandham (Ashok Selvan) are college sweethearts. It is revealed that Devi's vision is incurably deteriorating day by day. Certain challenges comes up post-marriage, but the couple concentrates on raising their child Tharani. Eventually, both rekindle, and Nithya helps Devi to pursue her dreams to play veena and supports her through the marriage.
3	"Kaadhal Enbadhu Kannula Heart Irukkura Emoji (transl. Love is a Heart-eyed emoji)"	Krishnakumar Ramakumar	Reshma Ghatla	18 May 2023
After influenced by the idea of love from cinema, Mallika (Ritu Varma) expects her real life to be in line with it. Going through a lot of struggles and breakups, she cannot find any suitable partner that matches her expectation. Finally, she accepts for an arranged marriage when her parents asked her. Mallika's husband (Vaibhav) feels happy to have her in his life due to her naughtiness as the same he has.
4	"Margazhi (transl. December)"	Akshay Sundher	Balaji Tharaneetharan	18 May 2023
Jazmine (Sanjula Sarathi), a girl in high school, feels depressed due to the separation of her parents. She copes herself with Ilaiyaraaja music. She develops an affection with her choir colleague Milton (Chu Khoy Sheng). Suddenly, when Milton plans to move out of the town, Jazmine is shattered. Later Jazmine realizes that it is just a phase in her life and makes her first kiss with Milton, followed by Milton expressing his admiration of beauty towards her. The episode ends with Jazmine smiling and feeling happy about her first kiss.
5	"Paravai Kootil Vaazhum Maangal (transl. Gazelles those resides in bird's nest)"	Bharathiraja	Pratheep Kumar S	18 May 2023
Ravi (Kishore) wants his wife Revathi (Ramya Nambeesan) to move out of his life due to the arrival of Rohini (Vijayalakshmi), his new love interest. Revathi accepts it calmly and is supportive towards their decision. She plans to leave the house to Rohini along with the kids in the house by acknowledging that people might lose out their love towards their partner. At the end, Revathi reminiscences her past that she met Ravi in a bus, who asks her a book to read the final chapter of it.
6	"Ninaivo Oru Paravai (transl. Memory is but a bird)"	Thiagarajan Kumararaja	Thiagarajan Kumararaja	18 May 2023
A progressive young couple, Sam (Wamiqa Gabbi) and K (PB), breaks up due to untold circumstances. Due to some misfortune, K loses his memory and Sam is to narrate all the past that happened between them. She narrates all of the events between them, and K eventually asks her what was the reason for their breakup, which Sam refuses to answer. K and Sam get into an argument that she is hiding the truth from him. Eventually, K meets up with Sam and confesses to her that he only remembers her in the accident and wants to start a new life with her. After they seemingly patch up, they dance in the rain and run home soaking. Sam closes the door almost immediately after entering their home with clothes that are bone dry, smiling at K; revealing that all the events are her mental conjunction, that imply K isn't around anymore.

== Production ==
The series was announced by Amazon Prime on 28 April 2022. The creative producer of the series is Thiagarajan Kumararaja. It was produced by Tyler Durden and Kino Fist. Modern Love Chennai is inspired by the American series Modern Love. The trailer for the series was released on 11 May 2023.

== Music ==
The soundtrack of the series was composed by Ilaiyaraaja, Yuvan Shankar Raja, G. V. Prakash Kumar and Sean Roldan.

Modern Love Chennai

Soundtrack album by Ilaiyaraaja, Yuvan Shankar Raja, G. V. Prakash Kumar, and Sean Roldan
- Released: 2023
- Recorded: 2023
- Genre: Amazon Prime Video Soundtrack
- Length: 45:51
- Language: Tamil
- Label: Prime Video India

Ilaiyaraaja chronology
Music School (2023)	Modern Love Chennai (2023)	Are You Ok Baby? (2023)

Yuvan Shankar Raja chronology
Custody (2023)	Modern Love Chennai (2023)	Bommai (2023)

G. V. Prakash Kumar chronology
Rudhran (2023)	Modern Love Chennai (2023)	Boo (2023)

Sean Roldan chronology
Good Night (2023)	Modern Love Chennai (2023)	Lucky Man (2023)

Track listing
No.	Title	Lyrics	Music	Singer(s)	Length
1.	"Yaayum Gnaayum" (Title Track)	Yugabharathi	Yuvan Shankar Raja	Shivani Panneerselvam	3:22
2.	"Jingrudha Dhanga" (Lalagunda Bommaigal)	Bakkiyam Shankar	Sean Roldan	Sean Roldan	3:17
3.	"Nenjil Oru Minnal" (Margazhi)	Ilaiyaraaja	Ilaiyaraaja	Ilaiyaraaja	2:46
4.	"Kukunnu" (Kaadhal Enbadhu Kannula Heart Irukkura Emoji)	Yugabharathi	G. V. Prakash Kumar	Remya Nambeesan, Vagumazan	2:52
5.	"Thee Inbamae" (Ninaivo Oru Paravai)	Yugabharathi	Ilaiyaraaja	Christopher Stanley	1:47
6.	"Peranbae" (Imaigal)	Yugabharathi	Yuvan Shankar Raja	Shivani Panneerselvam, Yuvan Shankar Raja	4:11
7.	"Paavi Nenjae" (Ninaivo Our Paravai)	Yugabharathi	Ilaiyaraaja	Ilaiyaraaja	2:38
8.	"Uravu" (Lalagunda Bommaigal)	Yugabharathi	Sean Roldan	Sean Roldan, Padmapriya Raghavan	3:14
9.	"Aanaal" (Ninaivo Oru Paravai)	Yugabharathi	Ilaiyaraaja	Ananya Bhat	2:18
10.	"Kaala Visai" (Ninaivo Oru Paravai)	Yugabharathi	Ilaiyaraaja	Shivani Panneerselvam	1:36
11.	"Sooriyan Thondrudhu Saamatthilae" (Ninaivo Oru Paravai)	Yugabharathi	Ilaiyaraaja	Priya Mali	1:24
12.	"Thendral" (Margazhi)	Ilaiyaraaja	Ilaiyaraaja	Ilaiyaraaja	3:45
13.	"Thaen Mazhaiyo" (Ninaivo Oru Paravai)	Yugabharathi	Ilaiyaraaja	Shivani Panneerselvam	1:17
14.	"Endrum Endhan" (Margazhi)	Ilaiyaraaja	Ilaiyaraaja	Priya Mali	0:52
15.	"Kaamaththup-Paal" (Ninaivo Oru Paravai)	—	Ilaiyaraaja	—	3:00
16.	"Kannil Pattu Nenjai Thotta Minnal" (Ninaivo Oru Paravai)	—	Ilaiyaraaja	—	1:04
17.	"The Good Bye" (Ninaivo Oru Paravai)	—	Ilaiyaraaja	—	5:36
18.	"Uncertainty of the future" (Ninaivo Oru Paravai)	—	Ilaiyaraaja	—	0:44
Total length:					45:51

== Release ==
The series was released on Amazon Prime Video on 18 May 2023.

== Reception ==
Kirubhakar Purushothaman of Indian Express gave 4 stars out of 5 and stated that " A fantastic sixer!" Latha Srinivasan critic of India Today gave 3.5 stars out of five and wrote that "One of the most important aspects of Modern Love Chennai is the music of Ilaiyaraaja which elevates this series to another level. With a mix of his old and new compositions, the ace music director has shown us that there is really no one comparable to him". A critic from Rediff.com appreciated film and noted that "Whistle Podu!"

Khushboo Ratda of Pinkvilla wrote that "Modern Love Chennai is all about warm, cherry stories, some are quirky and puzzling. A few stories converse with your heart." Logesh Balachandran of Times of india noted that "After Bharathiraja's episode, the one that really work is Thiagarajan Kumararaja's Ninaivo Oru Paravai." Haricharan Pudipeddi critic of Hindustan Times wrote that "The third Indian adaptation of the Modern Love franchise is here. It has stories that are flat, but some that speak to the heart." R Srinivasan of Ananda Vikatan gave mixed reviews. Bhuvanesh Chandar of The Hindu said that "Thiagarajan Kumararaja’s anthology is a phenomenal assortment of captivating love stories".

== See also ==
- Modern Love Mumbai, Mumbai chapter of Modern Love
- Modern Love Hyderabad, Hyderabad chapter of Modern Love
