= Maalavika Sundar =

Indian playback singer and actress

- Born: Maalavika Sundar; 7 May 1988 (age 38); Mettur, Tamil Nadu, India
- Occupations: Singer; musician; Actor
- Years active: 2000–present
- Spouse: Ashwin Kashyap Raghuraman (m. 2021)

Maalavika Sundar is an Indian playback singer and actress, who works in predominantly Tamil cinema. She participated in the reality show, Super Singer 3, in 2010 which was aired in Star Vijay and Indian Idol. She made her acting debut with the film Velvet Nagaram in 2020.

== Early life ==
Maalavika stated classical music with Srimathi Padmavathi Ananthagopalan younger sister of Lalgudi Jayaraman. Maalavika Sundar married Ashwin Kashyap Raghuraman he is an entrepreneur.

== Career ==
Maalavika worked as a carnatic singer before her film career. She made her debut as a playback singer with the folk song "Dang Dang" for Manam Kothi Paravai (2012), and the song's popularity earned her the name "Dang Dang" Malavika. She went on to sing several other songs notably "Karuppu Nerathazhagi" from Komban (2015) and "Gum Zaare" for Kadavul Irukaan Kumaru (2016).

== Discography ==
Year	Film	Song	Composer(s)	Language	
2012	Manam Kothi Paravai	"Dang Dang"	D. Imman	Tamil	
2014	Kochadayan	"Engal Kochadayan"	A. R. Rahman	Tamil	
2014	Sutta Pazham Sudatha Pazham	"Gonganikka"	Karthik Acharya	Tamil	
2015	Komban	"Karuppu Nerathazhagi"	G. V. Prakash Kumar	Tamil	
2015	Eetti	"Kuiyyo Muiyyo"	G. V. Prakash Kumar	Tamil	
2015	Kaaval	"Aadu Annatha"	G. V. Prakash Kumar	Tamil	
2016	Mass	"Thappale Unna"	Anirudh Ravichander	Telugu	
2016	Premaalayam	"Arjunuda "	A. R. Rahman	Telugu	Dubbed version
2016	Kadavul Irukaan Kumaru	"Gum Zaare"	G.V. Prakash Kumar	Tamil	
2016	Pencil	"LED Kannala"	G.V. Prakash Kumar	Tamil	
2017	Kadhal Kasakuthaiya	"Amma Chellam"	Dharan Kumar	Tamil	
2017	Mupparimanam	"Sokki Poraandi"	G.V.Prakash Kumar	Tamil	
2019	Jackpot	"Naa Jilla Kedi"	Vishal Chandrasekar	Tamil	
2019	100% Kadhal	"Kannum Kannum Plus"	G. V. Prakash Kumar	Tamil	
2022	DSP	"Nalla Irumaa "	D. Imman	Tamil	
2023	Raid	"En Vaazhvin Thoorigai"	Sam C. S.	Tamil	
2023	Dasara	"Dhoom Dhaam"	Santhosh Narayanan	Malayalam	Dubbed version
2023	Dasara	"Dhoom Dhaam"	Santhosh Narayanan	Kannada	Dubbed version
2023	Munthirikkaadu	"Paithiyam Pudikka"	A. K. Priyan	Tamil	
2023	Vela	"Ennile Iruntha"	Sam C. S.	Malayalam	
2025	Dilruba	"Kanna Nee"	Sam C. S.	Telugu	
2025	Tuk Tuk	"Alala"	Santhu Omkar	Telugu	
2026	Vaazha II: Biopic of a Billion Bros	"Thooki"	Arcado	Malayalam	

=== Independent tracks & album ===
Year	Title	Notes	Ref.
2018	Hazrat Amir Khusrau Main Toh Piya Se Naina Lara Aayi Re	composed by Vinod Krishnan	
2021	Vaa Sakhi		
2023	IIT Saarang		
2023	Amoodhamooru		
2023	Carnatic Cajoling		
2024	Gara Shayana Vibho		

== Television ==
Year	Shows	Role	Ref.
2010	Super Singer 3	Contestant	
2017	Indian Idol	Contestant	
