= Shamdat =

Indian cinematographer

Shamdat Sainudeen
- Born: Kerala, India
- Occupation: Cinematographer

Shamdat Sainudeen is an Indian cinematographer from Kerala, India. He has shot many films in Malayalam and Telugu including The Tiger, Kerala Cafe, Prasthanam, Marykkundoru Kunjaadu, Uttama Villain, Uppena, and Virupaksha. His directorial debut Street Lights released on 26 January 2018.

== Filmography ==
Year	Film	Language	Notes
2004	Premayanamaha	Telugu	
2005	Krithyam	Malayalam	
2005	The Tiger	Malayalam	
2005	Vargam	Malayalam	
2006	A Bahraini Tale	Arabic	
2006	Indrajith	Malayalam	
2006	Smart City	Malayalam	
2007	Nanma	Malayalam	
2008	Avakai Biryani	Telugu	
2008	Kavya's Diary	Telugu	
2009	Duplicate	Malayalam	
2009	I.G.	Malayalam	
2009	Ritu	Malayalam	
2009	Kerala Cafe	Malayalam	Segment: Aviramam
2010	Pramani	Malayalam	
2010	Prasthanam	Telugu	
2010	Marykkundoru Kunjaadu	Malayalam	
2011	Teja Bhai & Family	Malayalam	
2011	Venicile Vyaapari	Malayalam	
2013	Sahasam	Telugu	
2013	Artist	Malayalam	
2015	Uttama Villain	Tamil	
2015	Ayal Njanalla	Malayalam	
2015	Bhale Manchi Roju	Telugu	
2016	Oozham	Malayalam	
2016	Kattappanayile Rithwik Roshan	Malayalam	
2017	Role Models	Malayalam	
2018	Street Lights	Malayalam	Directorial debut
2018	Vishwaroopam 2 Vishwaroop 2	Tamil; Hindi	
2018	Devadas	Telugu	
2021	Uppena	Telugu	
2021	Sridevi Soda Center	Telugu	
2022	Ranga Ranga Vaibhavanga	Telugu	
2023	Virupaksha	Telugu	
2023	Mad	Telugu	
2025	Thandel	Telugu	
2025	Mad Square	Telugu	
