= Street Lights (film) =

- First Look Poster
- Directed by: Shamdat Sainudeen
- Written by: Fawaz Mohamed
- Produced by: Mammootty
- Starring: Mammootty; Lijomol Jose; Gayathri Krishnaa
- Cinematography: Sadat Sainudeen
- Edited by: Manoj
- Music by: Songs: Adarsh Abraham; Background Score: Yakzan-Neha
- Production company: Playhouse Motion Pictures
- Distributed by: Playhouse Release
- Release date: 26 January 2018
- Running time: 129 minutes
- Country: India
- Language: Malayalam

Street Lights is a 2018 Indian Malayalam-language action thriller film directed by cinematographer Shamdat in his directorial debut. The film is produced by Mammootty under his banner Playhouse Motion Pictures and starring himself alongside a different supporting cast in each language. The film features Soubin Shahir, Dharmajan Bolgatty, Hareesh Perumanna, Lijomol Jose, Rajendran and Stunt Silva who play pivotal roles. The film was also simultaneously shot in Tamil with Prithvi Rajan, Pandi, Pandiarajan, and Sreeram playing pivotal roles.

The principal photography began on 24 March 2017 and was conducted in Kochi, Pollachi, and Chennai. The Malayalam version was released on 26 January 2018 while the Tamil version remains unreleased.

== Plot ==
This film begins with a chase scene where two security guards are chasing two thieves wearing masks, catching up to them only to be beaten down by a third thief. They return to their hideout to reveal that they were unable to crack the safe but were able to yank off a rare Rs. 5 crore (or $724,000) necklace off of the homeowner's neck. The homeowners call their nephew James, who is a police detective, investigates it. The thieves are chased by the police and Sachi the second thief hides it in a bag. The bag is later taken by Mani, a boy. Soon after the chase James reveals that Murugan the third thief is a notorious criminal with a grudge on James as he killed Murugan's elder brother Manimaran. Finally the necklace reaches James and he catches Murugan and kills him.

== Cast ==
- Mammootty as CI James
- Soubin Shahir as Subin
- Stunt Silva as Murugan
- Rajendran as Manimaran
- Hareesh Perumanna as Raj
- Dharmajan Bolgatty as Sachi
- Lijomol Jose as Remya
- Gayathri Krishnaa as Jenny
- Jude Anthany Joseph as Peeyush
- Adish Praveen as Mani
- Rony David as SI Issac
- P R Rajasekharan as SI Moorthy
- Nandu as Remya's father
- Joy Mathew as Simon Mundakal
- Semmalar Annam as Malar, mother of Mani
- Sudhi Koppa as Thotti Sibi
- Neena Kurup as Maria
- Sohan Seenulal

== Production ==
=== Development ===
Cinematographer Shamdat is marking his directorial debut. Eager to direct a film, he watched many short films, and one of them led him into contacting its maker Fawaz Mohamed. After Shamdat told his idea to Fawaz, Fawaz developed the content into a story within a week. In 2016, Shamdat narrated the story to Mammootty at the sets of The Great Father, which he agreed to act and to produce. Originally scripted in Malayalam, the story featuring a certain Tamil-speaking characters and portions to be set in Tamil Nadu prompted the makers to make the film in Tamil also. Shamdat's initial idea of different production of film, as first in Malayalam and Tamil thereafter, was advanced to the simultaneous filming of both versions, since Mammootty was ready to finance also the Tamil version. Dialogues for Tamil version were written by Shamdat himself, while Malayalam dialogues along with script are credited to Fawaz Mohamed, who is also debutant. Shamdat does not include the film in any specific genre such as action, crime or suspense, and wants to call it an "entertainment thriller".

=== Casting and filming ===
The principal photography began on 24 March 2017 in Kochi, planned to be completed in a single schedule. Shamdat's brother Sadat Sainudeen was the cinematography. Mammootty had allotted his 20 days of date. An accident occurred during filming of a fight sequence held at Mattancherry, causing Vishnu Unnikrishnan an injury to his right hand wrist. He was prescribed two weeks' rest by the doctors and, subsequently, was replaced by Dharmajan Bolgatty. Lijomol Jose was offered a role by Shamdat during the shooting of her film Kattappanayile Rithwik Roshan. In Tamil version, a prominent role is played by Prithvi Rajan, who is placed at the way of a probe conducted by Mammootty, with few collaboration scenes between them, while he also leads a romantic comedy track, paired with Lijomol's character. Rajan's father, Pandiarajan, also plays an important role. Stunt choreographer Stunt Silva was cast for the antagonist, whose real looks and style were retained for the character.

In the case of filming, Tamil scenes were shot first, followed by Malayalam. In order to minimize the production cost and expedite the filming, only perfected shots based on finalized script were taken, and big monitors and crew were avoided. Filming was done with camera hidden at places like bus stands. Sound design was by Renganaath Ravee; sounds taken from day and night were used in the film. Tamil version is based in Chennai. According to the director, both versions were treated differently, in such a way that Malayalam features more humour while Tamil a serious narrative. Filming of both films completed in 35 days. In November 2017, the makers also planned to dub the film into Telugu. Mammootty himself dubbed in three languages.

== Soundtrack ==
Adarsh Abraham who was a programmer under Ouseppachan debuted as composer in the film, which comprises four songs. Neha Nair and Yakzan Gary Pereira duo composed film's score.

Soundtrack
No.	Title	Lyrics	Singer(s)	Length
1.	"Kaalamellam"	Manu Manjith	Haricharan	3:27

== Release ==
In November 2017, it was reported that release of the film is rescheduled to January 2018 because of the Telugu dubbing works. Malayalam version was released on 26 January 2018 in India and GCC countries.
