= Super Machi =

2021 film

- Theatrical release poster
- Directed by: Puli Vasu
- Written by: Puli Vasu
- Produced by: Rizwan
- Starring: Kalyaan Dhev; Rachita Ram
- Cinematography: Shyam K. Naidu
- Edited by: Marthand K. Venkatesh
- Music by: S. Thaman
- Production company: Rizwan Entertainment
- Release date: 14 January 2022
- Country: India
- Language: Telugu

Super Machi is a 2022 Indian Telugu-language romantic comedy-drama film written and directed by debutant Puli Vasu. Produced by Rizwan Entertainment, it stars Kalyaan Dhev and Rachita Ram (her Telugu debut) while Rajendra Prasad, Naresh and Posani Krishna Murali play supporting roles. The title is inspired by the song of the same name from S/O Satyamurthy. The film began its production in early 2019 but was delayed by the COVID-19 pandemic. Super Machi was released theatrically on 14 January 2022, coinciding with the festival of Sankranti.

== Cast ==
- Kalyaan Dhev as Raju
- Rachita Ram as Meenakshi
- Rajendra Prasad
- Naresh
- Posani Krishna Murali
- Pragathi
- Ajay
- Jabardasth Mahesh
- Satya
- Bhadram
- Prudhvi Raj

== Production and release ==
Super Machi is the second film of Kalyaan Dhev, ex-son-in-law of Chiranjeevi. It is directed by debutant Puli Vasu with music composed by S. Thaman. Initially, Rhea Chakraborty was signed as the female lead. However, she was later replaced by Kannada actress Rachita Ram who makes her Telugu debut. The film began its production in early 2019 but was put on hold due to major changes in the script. Production resumed in November 2019, but was halted again in March 2020 due to COVID-19 lockdown in India. The final schedule of the film began in June 2021 at Ramanaidu Studios, Hyderabad.

The film was planned to simultaneously release in Kannada with the title This Property Belongs to Meenakshi, however, the Kannada version was subsequently dropped. After several delays, the film was released theatrically on 14 January 2022, coinciding with the festival of Sankranti.

== Soundtrack ==
The soundtrack album consists of five songs composed by S. Thaman, and released by Aditya Music.

Super Machi (Original Motion Picture Soundtrack)
No.	Title	Lyrics	Singer(s)	Length
1.	"Chusanae Chusanae"	Krishna Kanth	Rita Thyagarajan	3:55
2.	"Meenamma"	Krishna Kanth	Venu Srirangam, Geetha Madhuri	4:18
3.	"Dinchaku Dinchaku"	Ramajogayya Sastry	Saketh Komanduri	2:33
4.	"Rahasya Premikudu"	Ramajogayya Sastry	Sony Komanduri	4:03
5.	"Thana Chinni Navve"	Kasarla Shyam	Kalyani Malik	3:31
Total length:				18:17

== Reception ==
The Times of India rated the film 2.75/5 and wrote, "Super Machi is an emotional suspense drama with a pure love story, which will appeal to the youth. Kalyaan Dhev's sincere performance and good drama in the first half are basic assets." A reviewer from Sakshi appreciated the director for bringing novelty in a routine storyline but opined that the emotional scenes in the latter half were poorly executed. Raju Aithagoni of Asianet News also echoed the same while praising the film's climax.

Praveen Kumar Vadla of News18 Telugu felt that it was part-emotional and part-confusing, rating it 2.5/5.
