= Sangeeth Sobhan =

Indian actor

- Born: 19 August 1997 (age 29); Hyderabad, Telangana, India
- Occupation: Actor
- Years active: 2011–present
- Father: Sobhan
- Relatives: Lakshmipati (uncle); Santosh Sobhan (brother)

Sangeeth Sobhan (born 19 August 1997) is an Indian actor who works in Telugu films. He later appeared in a supporting role in the Netflix anthology film Pitta Kathalu and the television series The Baker and the Beauty (both 2021).

His performance in the leading role in the Mad (2023) was widely appreciated and won the Filmfare Award for Best Male Debut and the SIIMA Award for Best Male Debut – Telugu.

== Early life and career ==
Sangeeth was born to Telugu film director Sobhan. His uncle Chittajalu Lakshmipati was a comedian in Telugu films and his elder brother is actor Santosh Sobhan.

Sangeeth appeared as a child actor in Golconda High School (2011). In 2023, he appeared as one of the three lead actors in Mad. His performance was appreciated by critics and audience alike.

== Filmography ==
Key
†	Denotes films that have not yet been released

=== Films ===
Year	Title	Role	Notes	Ref.
2010	Thakita Thakita	Nandini's brother	Child actor	
2011	Golconda High School	Varun	Child actor	
2018	Jhakaas!	Karan	Short film	
2023	Mad	Damodhar	Debut as lead actor; Filmfare Award for Best Male Debut – South; SIIMA Award for Best Male Debut – Telugu	
2023	Prema Vimanam	Mani	Released on ZEE5	
2025	Mad Square	Damodhar		
2025	Gamblers	Angel		
2026	Raakaasa	Veerababu "Veeru"		

=== Television ===
Year	Title	Role	Network	Ref.
2021	Pitta Kathalu	Neel	Netflix	Television debut; under segment xlife
2021	The Baker and The Beauty	Vikram Krishna Dasaripalle	Aha	
2021	3 Roses	Alex	Aha	
2021	Oka Chinna Family Story	Mahesh	ZEE5	
