= Happy Raj =

2026 Indian Tamil-language film

- Theatrical release poster
- Directed by: Maria Raja Elanchezian
- Written by: Maria Raja Elanchezian
- Produced by: Jaivarda; Jaikanth Suresh
- Starring: G. V. Prakash Kumar; Abbas; Sri Gouri Priya; George Maryan
- Cinematography: Madhan Christopher
- Edited by: Selva RK
- Music by: Justin Prabhakaran
- Production company: Beyond Pictures
- Distributed by: Five Star Creations
- Release date: 27 March 2026
- Running time: 159 minutes
- Country: India
- Language: Tamil

Happy Raj is a 2026 Indian Tamil-language romantic comedy drama film written and directed by debutante Maria Raja Elanchezian and produced by Beyond Pictures. It stars G. V. Prakash Kumar, Abbas (in his comeback to films), Sri Gouri Priya and George Maryan in the lead roles.

The film was officially announced, untitled, in July 2025; it is the first production for Beyond Pictures, and the official title was announced in December 2025. The music was composed by Justin Prabhakaran, with cinematography handled by Madhan Christopher and editing by Selva RK.

Happy Raj was theatrically released in theatres on 27 March 2026 to positive reviews from critics and became an box-office success.

== Plot ==
Kathamuthu is a miserly schoolteacher, nicknamed "kuthirai muttai" [horse egg] because of his body. The combination of his strict teaching and his nickname has made Happy something of a local joke, with people calling him "kutti kuthirai muttai" [small horse egg]. The body-shaming that begins with Kathamuthu's nickname doesn't stay with him; it carries over to Happy and stretches across generations, being revisited so often that what starts as a running gag turns into something oddly mean-spirited. His romantic life had been greatly affected by his father, causing him to dislike his father more over time. Because Happy wanted an actual love life, without his father ruining it, he decided to go abroad.

When Happy is hired by an IT company in Bangalore and meets Kavya, the film finds its groove. Kavya actually likes him, but on the condition that his family formally approach hers. Happy fears this will prevent him from marrying Kavya and cause a breakup. Her father, Rajiv, is an NRI, and when he collides with Kathamuthu, when they finally meet at Rajiv and his wife's 25th anniversary, Kathamuthu arrives with his village [because that's tradition], and the culture clash between the city-bred father and the village traditionalist becomes the film's engine.

Rajiv tells his business partners that it ruined his honor and was like a circus. Kathamuthu hears this and soon meets Rajiv to show him all his wealth, to embarrass him, and prove him wrong. Near the end, they each demand an apology from each other in order for Kavya and Happy to marry, leading them to create many plans. In the end,[for his son] Kathamuthu apologizes to Rajiv. Soon after, Kavya's family and Happy board a flight abroad.

During the flight, Happy becomes emotional thinking about his father and his story, prompting them to go back. We then see a flashback to the opening scene, where Happy is about to go to New Delhi, but Kathamuthu sacrifices his ticket for someone else, preventing them from going. That someone is young Rajiv, going to a job interview, hiding in the train bathroom without a ticket. Rajiv realizes and finally apologizes to Kathamuthu. The story explores themes of fairness, as well as social levels and separations.

== Cast ==
- G. V. Prakash Kumar as Ananda Raj alias "Happy"
  - Akilan as young Happy
- Abbas as Rajiv
- Sri Gouri Priya as Kavya
- George Maryan as Kathamuthu
- Geetha Kailasam as Gomathi Kathamuthu
- Prathana Nathan as Thenmozhi
- Premgi Amaren as Fake Priest (cameo appearance)
- Ramji as Gupta
- Adhirchi Arun as DJ Marimuthu
- Madurai Muthu as Boskey
- Mahesh Devi as Reena Rajiv
- Kannan Ponnaiaya as Mark Henry
- Aazhiya as Ritu, Kavya's sister
- KPY Pazhani as Advocate
- Jeeva Ravi as Thenmozhi's father
- Kamal Rasul as Pappu
- Soundar as Train Ticket Collector
- Baanumathi as Kavya's friend

== Production ==
The film is written and directed by Maria Raja Elanchezian, who previously worked as an assistant director to Pradeep Ranganathan in Love Today (2022), and marks the comeback of Abbas to films. Filming ended in January 2026.

== Music ==
The music was composed by Justin Prabhakaran in his second collaboration with G.V.Prakash Kumar after the 2023 film Adiyae. The first single "Aadiney Irupen" was released on 17 February 2026. The second single "Thuru Thuru" was released on 10 March 2026. The song marked Gangai Amaran's first playback vocal in 9 years.

Track listing
No.	Title	Lyrics	Singer(s)	Length
1.	"Aadiney Irupen"	Gana Vinoth	Gana Vinoth
2.	"Thuru Thuru"	Vivek	Gangai Amaran, Master Jaahanv S
3.	"Kadavulin Thottam"	Sarathy	S. P. Charan	5:05

In addition to the original soundtrack, the songs "Malai Mala", composed by Deva for the 2001 film Chocklet and "Podhuvaga En Manasu Thangam", composed by Ilaiyaraaja for the 1980 film Murattu Kaalai were featured in the film; the latter song was removed following a legal notice by Ilaiyaraaja.

== Release ==
=== Theatrical ===
Happy Raj was released in theatres on 27 March 2026, by Five Star Creations in Tamil Nadu.

=== Home media ===
The film began streaming on Amazon Prime Video from 24 April 2026.

== Reception ==
Abhinav Subramanian of The Times of India gave 3/5 stars and wrote, "Forced sentimentality and the all-too-familiar romanticization of tradition keep pulling the film back. Too many scenes feel manufactured, and you are constantly hand-held through the emotive parts". A critic from Dina Thanthi gave the film a positive review, praising the cast performances, cinematography and music but criticised the screenplay in the film's first half. Yuvashree from Zee News wrote that the second half of the film is far better than the first half. Anusha Sundar of OTTPlay gave 1.5/5 stars and wrote, "Happy Raj is a misstep in every choice of writing it takes. With bland conflict, messy assumptions and incorrect ideology, the film attempts to just work on foolish concepts, making it a messy affair". Bhuvanesh Chandar of The Hindu said the film "vexingly attempts to sell a performative redemption arc, but no amount of emotional coercion can hide its moral bankruptcy".
