= Tuk Tuk (film) =

2025 Indian Telugu-language film by Supreeth C Krishna

- Theatrical release poster
- Directed by: Supreeth C Krishna
- Written by: Supreeth C Krishna
- Produced by: Rahul Reddy D.; Lokku Sri Varun; C. Sreeramulu Reddy
- Starring: Harsh Roshan; Karthikeya Dev; Madhu Sudhan Rapeti; Saanve Megghana; Nihal Kodhaty
- Cinematography: Karthik Saikumar
- Edited by: Ashwath Shivkumar
- Music by: Santhu Omkar
- Production companies: Chithravaahini Productions; RYG Cinemas
- Release date: 21 March 2025
- Running time: 128 minutes
- Country: India
- Language: Telugu

Tuk Tuk is a 2025 Indian Telugu-language supernatural comedy film written and directed by Supreeth C Krishna, produced by Rahul Reddy D, Lokku Sri Varun, C Sree Ramulu Reddy under the banners of Chitravaahani Productions and RYG Cinemas The film features Harsh Roshan, Karthikeya Dev, Madhu Sudhan Rapeti, Saanve Megghana and Nihal Kodhaty in important roles.

== Plot ==
In a rural village of Chittoor, three aimless young men, desperate to earn money, resort to secretly recording women bathing. Their lives take a strange turn when they come across a scooter possessed by a spirit. Seizing the opportunity, they use the scooter to lead a Ganesh Chaturthi procession and start making money. However, their world is turned upside down when they discover the spirit is actually a girl. The rest of the story unravels the mystery of how the girl became a spirit, how she ended up in the scooter, and the tragic love story that led to her untimely fate.

== Cast ==
- Harsh Roshan
- Karthikeya Dev
- Madhu Sudhan Rapeti
- Saanve Megghana as Shilpa
- Nihal Kodhaty as Naveen
- Dayanand Reddy

== Production ==
Director Supreeth C Krishna, known for his work on Telugu film, Alanti Sithralu, said, The inspiration for the film came from a RuPay commercial featuring an animated vehicle. "Why can't it be the central character of a story?" This idea served as the foundation for Tuk Tuk, further developed through his cinematic vision and storytelling sensibilities

While Karthik Saikumar handled the cinematographer, where the film was edited by Ashwath Shivkumar

A song named "Ru Ru" was created using AI technology, making it India's first ever end to end AI-generated lyrical video.

== Music ==
All lyrics are written by Supreeth C Krishna; all music is composed by Santhu Omkar.

No.	Title	Singer(s)	Length
1.	"Alala"	Maalavika Sundar	5:37
2.	"World Tour"	Santhu Omkar	4:21
3.	"Ru Ru"	Pavithra Narkinabilli, Santhu Omkar	3:20
4.	"Koyilamma"	Yazin Nizar	4:22

== Release ==
Theatrical

Tuk Tuk was released on 21 March 2025.

Home Media

Tuk Tuk is available for streaming on ETV Win and Amazon Prime Video

== Reception ==
The Times of India gave a rating of 3 out of 5 and wrote that "Tuk Tuk is a fun, offbeat fantasy drama that manages to keep audiences entertained despite a few bumps in the storytelling". Giving the same rating BH Harsh of Cinema Express and opined that, "The film wears its heart on its sleeve, even when it doesn’t have the vigour or craft to express itself with full effect".
