= Prema Vimanam =

2023 film by Santosh Kata

- Directed by: Santosh Kata
- Written by: Santosh Kata
- Produced by: Abhishek Nama
- Starring: Devansh Nama; Anirudh Nama; Sangeeth Sobhan; Saanve Megghana; Anasuya Bharadwaj; Vennela Kishore
- Cinematography: Jagadeesh Cheekati
- Edited by: Amar Reddy Kudumula
- Music by: Anup Rubens
- Production company: Abhishek Pictures
- Distributed by: ZEE5
- Release date: 12 October 2023
- Running time: 146 minutes
- Country: India
- Language: Telugu

Prema Vimanam (transl. Love airplane) is a 2023 Indian Telugu-language comedy film directed by Santosh Kata and produced by Abhishek Nama. The film features Devansh Nama, Anirudh Nama, Sangeeth Sobhan, Saanve Megghana, Anasuya Bharadwaj and Vennela Kishore in primary roles.

It released on 13 October 2023, directly for streaming on ZEE5 as a part of its original programming.

== Plot ==
Two kids from a small village dream of boarding an aeroplane one day and go to extreme lengths to realize their dream. On the other hand, a young couple who are deeply in love have to elope and plan to fly to Dubai to save their love. Their journeys intersect at a point that change their lives in an unexpected ways.

== Cast ==
- Devansh Nama as Ramu
- Anirudh Nama as Lachu
- Sangeeth Sobhan as Mani
- Saanve Megghana as Abhitha
- Anasuya Bharadwaj as Santha
- Vennela Kishore as School Teacher
- Goparaju Ramana
- Surabhi Prabhavathi
- Kalpa Latha
- Supreeth
- Aziz Naser

== Production ==
The shooting of the film started on August 15, 2022. It was reported that the movie had a similar plot to another Telugu film, Vimanam, which was released in June 2023. Director Santosh Kata however had clarified that while the premise was similar, his film is completely different from Vimanam.

== Music ==
The music of Prema Vimanam has been composed by Anup Rubens.

No.	Title	Singer(S)	Length
1.	"Ajanaka Bajanaka"	Neil Krithan	4:21

== Reception ==
The movie received mixed critical response. The Times of India stated, "Prema Vimanam is an enjoyable cinematic experience that champions the spirit of hope and resilience". The Hindustan Times rated it 2 3/4 out of 5.
