= Writer Padmabhushan =

- Theatrical release poster
- Directed by: Shanmukha Prasanth
- Produced by: Anurag Reddy; Sharath Chandra; Chandru Manoharan
- Starring: Suhas; Tina Shilparaj; Rohini; Ashish Vidyarthi
- Cinematography: Venkat R. Shakamuri
- Edited by: Kodati Pavan Kalyan; Siddharth Thatholu
- Music by: Score: Kalyan Nayak; Songs: Shekar Chandra; Kalyan Nayak
- Production companies: Chai Bisket Films; Lahari Films
- Distributed by: Geetha Film Distributors
- Release date: 3 February 2023
- Running time: 123 minutes
- Country: India
- Language: Telugu
- Box office: est. ₹12.05 crore

Writer Padmabhushan is a 2023 Indian Telugu-language comedy drama film directed by debutant Shanmukha Prasanth. The film features Suhas in the titular role, along with Tina Shilparaj, Rohini and Ashish Vidyarthi. The film was released on 3 February 2023 to positive reviews from critics, and it became a commercial success.

== Plot ==
Set in Vijayawada, the film revolves around Padmabhushan. Padmabhushan, the only child to his parents is an aspiring writer who publishes his first book with hopes of becoming a famous writer. The twists that follow in his life, how he overcomes all the challenges that come along his way and wins the hand of his love Sarika forms the rest of the story.

== Cast ==
- Suhas as P. Padmabhushan
- Tina Shilparaj as Sarika
- Rohini as Saraswati, Padmabhushan's mother
- Sri Gouri Priya as Kanna
- Ashish Vidyarthi as Madhusudhan Rao, Padmabhushan's father
- Goparaju Ramana as Lokendra Kumar, Sarika's father
- Praveen Katari as Saumitri, Padmabhushan’s friend
- Ashok Kumar as Baburao, Padmabhushan’s manager
- Pragna Kiran as Kanna’s mother

== Music ==
The film score is composed by Kalyan Nayak, whereas the songs were composed by Shekar Chandra along with the former. The audio rights were acquired by Lahari Music and T-Series. The first song "Kannullo Nee Roopame" was released on 10 July 2022.

Writer Padmabhushan

Soundtrack album by Shekar Chandra, Kalyan Malik
- Released: 2023
- Recorded: 2022
- Genre: Feature film soundtrack
- Length: 19:01
- Language: Telugu
- Label: Lahari Music

Shekar Chandra chronology
| Sammathame (2022) | Writer Padmabhushan (2023) |

Kalyan Nayak chronology
| Jayamundhi Bhayamela Manasaa (2022) | Writer Padmabhushan (2023) |

Track listing
| No. | Title | Lyrics | Music | Singer(s) | Length |
|---|---|---|---|---|---|
| 1. | "Kannullo Nee Roopame" | Bhaskarabhatla | Shekar Chandra | Dhanunjay Seepana | 3:58 |
| 2. | "Aybaboi Gandaragolam" | Koti Mamidala | Kalyan Nayak | Lakshmi Meghana, Kavya Chandana, Aparna, Sai Dev Harsha, Sai Charan, Harsha Chavali | 3:06 |
| 3. | "Bezawada Sandhullo" | Bhaskarabhatla | Shekar Chandra | Lokeshwar Edara | 3:41 |
| 4. | "Ennallilaa" | Bhaskarabhatla | Shekhar Chandra | Anurag Kulkarni | 4:11 |
| 5. | "Manninchava Amma" | Koti Mamidala | Kalyan Nayak | Karthik, Kalyan Nayak | 4:05 |
| Total length: | | | | | 19:01 |

== Release ==
=== Theatrical Release ===
Writer Padmabhushan was released on 3 February 2023. Geetha Arts acquired the theatrical distribution rights of the film.

=== Home media ===
The satellite and digital streaming rights were sold to Zee Telugu and ZEE5 respectively. It premiered on Zee5 on 17 March 2023.

== Reception ==
Ram Venkat Srikar of The New Indian Express rated the film 3.5 out of 5 and wrote that "Writer Padmabhushan is not a flawless film. It has some issues craft-wise and writing-wise too but it is the kind of lovely little film that we often see in Malayalam and wish something like that was made here, in our world". The Times of India's Neeshita Nyayapati stated that "Writer Padmabhushan is the kind of film that’s perfect to watch with your family", giving a rating of 3 out of 5.
