= Sri Gouri Priya =

Indian actress and model

- Born: Gouri Priya Reddy; 13 November 1998 (age 27); Hyderabad, Andhra Pradesh (now in Telangana), India
- Education: St Francis College for Women
- Occupations: Actress; model
- Years active: 2016–present

Sri Gouri Priya (born 13 November 1998) is an Indian actress and model, who appears in Telugu and Tamil films. She made her acting debut wih Nirmala Convent (2016), and is known for Mad (2023) and Lover (2024).

== Early life ==
She was born in Hyderabad to Srinivas Reddy and Vasundhara. She completed her Bachelor of Management Studies from St Francis College for Women, Begumpet. While still a student in 2018, she won the modeling pageant for Miss Hyderabad.

== Career ==
After a minor role in Fidaa (2017), she starred in Mail (2021) and Writer Padmabhushan (2021) before making her breakthrough with the college film Mad (2023).

She starred in the romantic dramas Lover (2024) and Chennai Love Story (2026). She also starred in the romantic comedy Happy Raj (2026).

== Filmography ==
Key
†	Denotes films that have not yet been released

- All films are in Telugu, unless otherwise noted

Year	Title	Role	Language	Notes
2016	Manalo Okkadu	Student	Telugu	
2017	Fidaa	Bhanumati's co-passenger	Telugu	
2021	Mail	Roja	Telugu	
2021	Writer Padmabhushan	Kanna	Telugu	
2021	Sreekaram	Bujji	Telugu	
2023	Mad	Shruti	Telugu	
2024	Lover	Divya Shanmugam	Tamil	Won—Filmfare Award for Best Female Debut – South; Won—SIIMA Award forBest Debut Actress; Nominated—Filmfare Award for Best Actress – Tamil
2026	Happy Raj	Kavya	Tamil	
2026	Chennai Love Story	Nivedita "Nivi"	Telugu	
2026	VISA: Vintara Saradaga †	TBA	Telugu	
TBA	Bro Club †	TBA	Tamil	

=== Television ===
Year	Title	Role	Network	Language
2023	Modern Love Chennai	Shobha	Amazon Prime Video	Tamil
