= Pushpaka Vimanam =

2021 film by Damodara

- Theatrical release poster
- Directed by: Damodara
- Written by: Damodara
- Produced by: Govardhan Rao Devarakonda; Vijay Mattapally; Pradeep Errabelly
- Starring: Anand Deverakonda; Geeth Saini; Saanve Megghana; Sunil
- Cinematography: Hestin Jose Joseph
- Edited by: Ravi Teja Girijala
- Music by: Ram Miriyala; Sidharth Sadasivuni; Mark K Robin; Amit N Dasani
- Production companies: King of the Hill Entertainment; Tanga Productions
- Distributed by: Suresh Productions; Global Cinemas; Freeze Frame Films (Overseas)
- Release date: 12 November 2021
- Running time: 142 minutes
- Country: India
- Language: Telugu

Pushpaka Vimanam is a 2021 Indian Telugu-language comedy thriller film written and directed by Damodara and produced by Govardhan Rao Devarakonda, Vijay Mattapally and Pradeep Errabelly under the banners of King of the Hill Entertainment and Tanga Productions. The film stars Anand Deverakonda, Geeth Saini, Saanve Megghana, and Sunil. The film was released on 12 November 2021.

== Plot ==
Chittilanka Sundar is a recently married teacher who hopes for a happy life with his wife, Meenakshi. However, she elopes with someone else, leaving Sundar embarrassed and determined to conceal the situation from his neighbours and colleagues while secretly searching for her. His attempts to question her parents and friends yield nothing.

When Sundar's colleagues plan to visit his home to greet the newlyweds, he hires an actor, Rekha, to pose as his wife. They successfully maintain the pretence despite interference from a noisy neighbour. Later, the school's headmaster sees Rekha smoking with her friends and reprimands Sundar. He also arranges for the staff to buy a new HD television, using the opportunity to counsel Rekha.

While watching television, Sundar sees a news report announcing Meenakshi's death. Shocked, he goes to the mortuary and identifies her body. SI Rangam initially suspects Sundar and discovers blood stains in his house, which are confirmed to be Meenakshi's. Sundar's earlier lies also prevent him from proving that she had eloped, leading Rangam to suspect that Rekha was his accomplice. During a violent interrogation, Sundar finally explains why Meenakshi left him.

On their first night together, Sundar asks Meenakshi whether she was a virgin, angering her. Although he later apologises, she remains unresponsive. Their relationship deteriorates further when Sundar attempts to hit her after she insults his father, prompting her to leave for her former boyfriend's house.

Meenakshi's postmortem establishes that she died on the 10th. Sundar provides a partial alibi for that day, so the police release him. His neighbour, an aspiring musician, tries to console him, claiming that he spent the day composing the best music of his career and could not leave his chair.

Rangam questions Meenakshi's former boyfriend and learns that she had left him after a major argument. The police subsequently attempt to arrest Sundar, but he escapes. While hiding, he discovers that Meenakshi had stayed with a friend whom he had previously questioned. He goes to her house and learns that Meenakshi had intended to return to Sundar on the day she died.

Investigating further, Sundar discovers that his neighbour attempted to assault Meenakshi and accidentally killed her by pushing her. Rangam takes credit for solving the case, while Sundar begins to move on with his life.

== Cast ==
- Anand Deverakonda as Chittilanka Sundar
- Geeth Saini as Meenakshi
- Saanve Megghana as Rekha
- Sunil as SI Rangam
- Naresh as School Headmaster
- Sharanya Pradeep as Meenakshi's friend
- Harsha Vardhan as Sundar's neighbour and a budding music director
- Harsha Chemudu as Meenakshi's ex
- Vajja Venkata Giridhar as Social teacher
- Kireeti Damaraju as Abhi, Sundar's friend
- Varsha Bollamma in a cameo appearance
- Bhadram as Sai, Pushpak Travels Agent
- Nivitha as Telugu teacher (TT)

== Music ==
Pushpaka Vimanam

Soundtrack album by: Ram Miriyala; Sidharth Sadasivuni; Mark K Robin; Amit N Dasani
- Released: 6 October 2021
- Recorded: 2021
- Genre: Feature film soundtrack
- Length: 18:44
- Language: Telugu
- Label: Aditya Music

Soundtrack album
- Pushpaka Vimanam Full Songs Jukebox

Background score of the film was composed by Mark K Robin. 2 songs ("Kalyanam" and "Silakaa") were composed by Ram Miriyala, 2 songs ("Aaha" and "Malli Rava") were composed by Sidharth Sadasivuni, 1 song ("Swamy Ra Ra (Krishna Shabdam)") was composed by Amit N Dasani and 1 song ("Chori Chori Dekho Rey") was composed by Mark K Robin.

Track listing
No.	Title	Lyrics	Music	Singer(s)	Length
1.	"Kalyanam"	Kasarla Shyam	Ram Miriyala	Sid Sriram	3:01
2.	"Aaha"	Phani Kumar Raghava	Sidharth Sadasivuni	Kailash Kher	3:29
3.	"Silakaa"	Ram Miriyala and Anand Gurram	Ram Miriyala	Ram Miriyala	4:06
4.	"Swamy Ra Ra (Krishna Shabdam)"	Traditional	Amit N Dasani	Chinmayi	3:15
5.	"Malli Rava"	Rahman	Sidharth Sadasivuni	Hariharan	2:41
6.	"Chori Chori Dekho Rey"	Krishna Kanth	Mark K Robin	Damini Bhatla	1:51

== Reception ==
The film received mixed reviews from critics. Neeshita Nyayapati of The Times Of India gave the film a rating of 3 out of 5 and wrote "Pushpaka Vimanam is by no means the perfect dark comedy it sets out to be, especially when films in a similar genre have already done better in Telugu. But watch it this weekend if you’re game for a quirky film with a pinch of comedy, spoon-full of twists and a stellar cast to back it all up". Gabbeta Ranjith Kumar of The Indian Express stated "Anand Deverakonda's performance adds value to this part-comedy, part-investigative drama".

The New Indian Express' Ram Venkat Srikar rated the film 3/5 felt it was an "enjoyable comedy that doubles up as a whodunit." Reviewing the film for The Hindu, Sangeetha Devi Dundoo concluded that "There are all interesting ideas, but the narrative doesn’t bring everything together in an engrossing manner. A better screenplay might have helped make Pushpaka Vimanam a quirky black comedy it intended to be. It’s not a bad film, it isn’t great either."
