= Taxiwaala =

2018 Indian film by Rahul Sankrityan

- Theatrical release poster
- Directed by: Rahul Sankrityan
- Screenplay by: Saikumar Reddy
- Story by: Rahul Sankrityan
- Produced by: Sreenivasa Kumar Naidu (SKN); Bunny Vasu; V. Vamsi Krishna Reddy; Pramod Uppalapati
- Starring: Vijay Deverakonda; Priyanka Jawalkar; Malavika Nair
- Cinematography: Sujith Sarang
- Edited by: Sreejith Sarang
- Music by: Jakes Bejoy
- Production companies: GA2 Pictures; UV Creations
- Release date: 17 November 2018
- Running time: 137 minutes
- Country: India
- Language: Telugu
- Box office: est. ₹42 crore

Taxiwaala (transl. Taxi driver) is a 2018 Indian Telugu-language supernatural comedy thriller film directed by Rahul Sankrityan. Produced by UV Creations and GA2 Pictures, the film stars Vijay Deverakonda, Priyanka Jawalkar, and Malavika Nair. The music was composed by Jakes Bejoy with cinematography by Sujith Sarang and editing by Sreejith Sarang. The film released on 17 November 2018 to positive reviews and became a box office success.

The car used in the film was a modified Hindustan Contessa.

== Plot ==
At a hospital, a woman, her husband, and her brother-in-law are devastated after she gives birth to a stillborn baby boy, while another young woman mourns the death of her mother.

The film cuts to a year later. A taxi driver plans to get rid of his car. One rainy night, his wife witnesses a supernatural presence in it.

Shiva (the brother-in-law from the prologue) comes to Hyderabad to live with his friend Babai and find a job. After going through several jobs, he is dissatisfied and decides to become a taxi driver. He goes to his village to get money from his brother, but instead gets it from his sister-in-law, who readily gives away her mangalsutra to him. A grateful Shiva agrees to help pay the costs for his sister-in-law to get admitted into a better hospital for the birth of her second child. Shiva, Babai, and their friend Hollywood search for a car within their budget but fail. One morning, Shiva gets a call from an unknown person who is prepared to sell him a car. Shiva happily accepts, while Babai is a little hesitant.

Shiva starts to work for the Ola Cab Service. On his first ride, he falls in love with a medical resident named Anusha after safely giving her a ride from a night out. Over time, he starts to experience paranormal incidents in the car, notably a drunk passenger being scared. He tries to contact the car's previous owner but learns that he has moved away. A fake fakir comes and fools Shiva, Babai, and Hollywood to steal the car, but is almost killed inside it.

The next morning, Shiva and his friends see the car in their garage. Shiva has to arrange money for his sister-in-law's upcoming delivery, so he decides to drive the car again. After being saved from an accident by the car itself, Shiva comes to befriend it. One night after dropping Anusha at her residence, Shiva is asked by a doctor to drop him somewhere. Suddenly, the car takes control and ultimately kills the doctor by throwing him onto some train tracks to be run over, much to Shiva's horror.

Shiva decides to rob the previous car owner's house to get his money back. He, Babai, and Hollywood break into the house and find a man imprisoned in the store room. They admit the man into a hospital, where Anusha treats him. After waking up, he reveals the truth about the car.

The man is a psychology and parapsychology professor. Among his subjects is astral projection, through which a person can separate their soul from their body before death and can also meet the dead. One of his students, Sisira Bharadwaj (the young woman from the prologue), lived with her stepfather, Raghuram, and a wealthy, asthmatic mother. The night of her birthday, she fought with her mother when Raghuram tried to replace Sisira's old car, which was a gift from her late father. Later that night, Sisira's mother suddenly began suffocating and could not find her inhaler. She knocked on her daughter's door but was ignored. Sisira's mother died when Sisira found her, leaving the latter in grief and depression.

Sisira begged her professor to perform an astral projection ritual on her so she could see her mother one last time. The process was successful, and Sisira's spirit ventured into the astral world. She realized that her mother was actually murdered by Raghuram so he could usurp her company, and the doctor, who was Raghuram's friend, poisoned her mother and stole her inhaler. Just then, Raghuram arrived and interrupted the ritual. He and the doctor decided to stage Sisira's death as a suicide and captured the professor to kill him later. The two were transported in Sisira's old car, which her soul bonded to after being separated from her body. Sisira's will had her body donated to science and was kept in a hospital.

In the present, the professor reveals that Sisira can be brought back to life if they retrieve her body. Moved by her story, Shiva agrees to help. He and his friends break into the hospital and manage to steal Sisira's body with the help of the fakir-turned-security guard who had tried to steal their car earlier. However, Raghuram plans to destroy Sisira's body and comes to the hospital. He is almost killed by her spirit, but barely saves himself. Shiva beats Raghuram and takes him and Sisira's body to the professor's lab, where the car is. Raghuram wakes up and tries to kill Shiva, but the car stops him, and he's burned to death. Unfortunately, Sisira's body is also destroyed in the fire despite Shiva's efforts.

Later, Shiva learns from Anusha that his sister-in-law gave birth to a girl who was also stillborn due to a chromosome abnormality. At the hospital, Anusha sadly reveals that his sister-in-law will never be able to have a child. Everyone goes to the garage in grief and tries to console each other. In the car, Sisira's soul enters the baby girl's body and starts crying, giving both herself and the couple a second chance. Shiva, his family, his friends, the professor, and Anusha come together and cuddle the baby.

== Cast ==
- Vijay Devarakonda as Shiva
- Priyanka Jawalkar as Anusha alias Anu
- Malavika Nair as Sisira Bharadwaj
- Madhunandan as Babai, Shiva's friend
- Vishnu Oi as Hollywood
- Ravi Varma as Sisira's professor
- Shiju as Raghuram, Sisira's stepfather
- Prasanna Kumara Dissanayake as Aryan Shiva's second friend
- Yamuna as Sisira's mother
- Ravi Prakash as Shiva's brother
- Kalyani as Shiva's sister-in-law
- Uttej as Doctor
- Kireeti Damaraju as Doctor
- Satya Krishnan as Doctor
- Chammak Chandra as Fake Fakir / Hospital Security Guard
- Chitram Srinu

== Music ==
Taxiwaala

Soundtrack album by Jakes Bejoy
- Released: 17 November 2018
- Recorded: 2018
- Genre: Soundtrack
- Length: 16:43
- Label: Aditya Music
- Producer: Jakes Bejoy

Jakes Bejoy chronology
Ranam (2018)	Taxiwaala (2018)	The Gambinos (2019)

The soundtrack was composed by Jakes Bejoy in his Telugu debut. The song "Maate Vinadhuga" was the first to be released.

All tracks are written by Krishna Kanth.

Track listing
No.	Title	Singer(s)	Length
1.	"Maate Vinadhuga"	Sid Sriram	4:35
2.	"Ladies and Gentlemen"	Vedala Hemachandra	3:22
3.	"Crazy Car"	Revanth	4:22
4.	"Neeve Neeve"	Shreya Ghoshal	4:24
Total length:			16:43

== Release ==
The pirated version of the film was leaked on piracy websites ten days before its theatrical release. Nevertheless, the film released theatrically as scheduled on 17 November 2018.

It was dubbed and simultaneously released in Tamil as Sadugudu Vandi and in Hindi as Super Taxi.

== Reception ==
Suhas Yellapantula of The Times of India rated the film three out of five stars and wrote that "Taxiwaala works in parts, largely thanks to a wonderful performance from Vijay Deverakonda, but the film veers away from Vijay and his character in the second half, tying itself up in knots. A weak climax and patchy narration derails an otherwise entertaining fare." A critic from Idlebrain.com rated the film three out of five stars and opined that Taxiwaala proves decent content trumps piracy. The film excels with its concept, execution, and Vijay Deverakonda's performance, but slows down in the second half.

Manoj Kumar R of The Indian Express gave it two-and-a-half out of five stars and wrote that "Barring a few glaring gaps in the story, Rahul Sankrityan has managed to whip up a pretty decent potboiler that leans heavily on Vijay Deverakonda's charms and his newfound stardom." Sangeetha Devi Dundoo of The Hindu wrote that "Taxiwaala is a cocktail of comedy and the paranormal with a hint of quirk".

== See also ==
- Christine (1983 film)
