= Gamanam (2021 film) =

Telugu-language anthology film

- Directed by: Sujana Rao
- Screenplay by: Sujana Rao
- Dialogues by: Sai Madhav Burra
- Story by: Sujana Rao
- Produced by: Ramesh Karutoori; Venki Pushadapu; Gnana Shekar V.S
- Starring: Shriya Saran; Nithya Menen; Siva Kandukuri; Priyanka Jawalkar; Suhas; Bithiri Sathi; Ravi Prakash
- Cinematography: Gnana Shekar V. S.
- Edited by: Ramakrishna Aaram
- Music by: Ilaiyaraaja
- Production companies: Kria Film Corp; Kali Productions
- Release date: 10 December 2021
- Country: India
- Language: Telugu

Gamanam (transl. Voyage) is a 2021 Indian Telugu-language anthology film written and directed by debutant Sujana Rao and produced by Ramesh Karutoori, Venki Pushadapu and Gnana Shekar V.S under the Kria Film Corp and Kali Productions banners. The film stars Shriya Saran, Siva Kandukuri and Priyanka Jawalkar along with Suhas, Nithya Menen, Charuhasan, Bithiri Sathi, and Ravi Prakash. The dialogues were written by Sai Madhav Burra. The film was released on 10 December 2021.

== Cast ==
- Shriya Saran as Kamala
- Shiva Kandukuri as Ali
- Priyanka Jawalkar as Zara
- Suhas as Abdullah, Ali's friend
- Nithya Menen as Shailaputri Devi
- Charuhasan as Ali's Grandfather
- Bithiri Sathi
- Ravi Prakash as Police Officer Raghuram
- Priya
- Indu Anand as Ali's Grandmother
- Nehanth
- Sanjay Swaroop as Zara's Father
- Kancharapalem Raju as cricket coach

== Production ==
The principal photography of the film started in 2019. Majority of the film was shot in Hyderabad and Visakhapatnam cities. The shooting of the film was completed in early 2020. While the post-production of the film was resumed in September 2020, there were many delays in production due to COVID-19 pandemic.

== Release ==
The Telugu version of the film was released on 10 December, while Hindi, Tamil, Malayalam and Kannada languages released on 1 March 2022 in Amazon Prime Video.

== Soundtrack ==
The music of the film is composed by Ilaiyaraaja and lyrics are written by Krishnakanth.

== Reception ==
Neeshitha Nyayapati of The Times of India, rated the film 3/5 and wrote, "Gamanam is a mixed bag that has some good moments while others leave you wanting." Sangeetha Devi Dundoo of The Hindu appreciating the director, wrote, "Despite the predictable pitfalls, the film holds its own and narrates stories with conviction, marking the arrival of a new director who is unafraid to go against mainstream Telugu film tropes."
