= Happy Ending (2024 film) =

2024 Indian Telugu-language film by Kowshik Bheemidi

- Theatrical release poster
- Directed by: Kowshik Bheemidi
- Written by: Naga Sai
- Produced by: Yogesh Kumar; Sanjay Reddy; Anil Pallala
- Starring: Yash Puri; Apoorva Rao
- Cinematography: Ashok Seepally
- Edited by: Pradeep R Moram
- Music by: Ravi Nidamarthy
- Production companies: Hamstech Films; Silly Monks Studios
- Release date: 2 February 2024
- Running time: 127 minutes
- Country: India
- Language: Telugu

Happy Ending is a 2024 Indian Telugu-language coming-of-age comedy drama film directed by Kowshik Bheemidi. The film features Yash Puri and Apoorva Rao in lead roles.

The film was released on 2 February 2024.

== Cast ==
- Yash Puri as Harsha
  - Harsh Roshan as young Harsha
- Apoorva Rao as Avani
- Vishnu Oi
- Ajay Ghosh
- Jhansi
- Anitha Chowdhary
- Vamsi Nekkanti
- KLK Mani
- Jiya Sharma
- Kamal Tumu
- Swetha
- Vasu Inturi as Ramachandar

== Music ==
The background score and soundtrack were composed by Ravi Nidamarthy.

All music is composed by Ravi Nidamarthy.

Track listing
No.	Title	Lyrics	Singer(s)	Length
1.	"Oori Pillagaada"	Lakshmi Priyanka	Lavanya Sista	3:30
2.	"Teneteega"	Feroz Israel	Feroz Israel	3:54
3.	"Neelakasam"	Lakshmi Priyanka	Lavanya Sista	4:22
4.	"Nagumomu"	Lakshmi Priyanka	Krishna Tejasvi	3:51

== Release ==
Happy Ending was released on 2 February 2024. Post-theatrical digital streaming rights were acquired by Aha and was premiered on 3 May 2024.

== Reception ==
Raisa Nasreen of Times Now gave a rating of 3 out of 5. Calling it as a "missed opportunity", The Times of India gave a rating of 2 out of 5 and wrote that "Despite strong performances and a novel concept, it is hindered by its execution, struggling to find a cohesive voice amidst its blend of genres".
