= Sutta Pazham Sudatha Pazham =

2016 Indian film by Shiva G.

- Promotional poster
- Directed by: Shiva G.
- Written by: Shiva G.
- Produced by: Dr. R. Sivan; R. Selvan
- Starring: Raju; Kashmira Panache
- Cinematography: R. H. Ashok
- Edited by: C. J. Elangovan
- Music by: Karthik Acharya
- Production company: RR Cine Arts
- Release date: 27 May 2016
- Country: India
- Language: Tamil

Sutta Pazham Sudatha Pazham (transl. Stolen fruit, unstolen fruit) is a 2016 Indian Tamil-language comedy film directed by Shiva G. and starring Raju and Kashmira Panache. The film was released to mixed-to-negative reviews.

== Cast ==
- Raju
- Kashmira Panache as Priya
- Powerstar Srinivasan
- Robo Shankar as kidnapper
- Mahanadi Shankar as kidnapper
- Bayilvan Ranganathan as police inspector
- King Kong as kidnapper
- Jasper as thug
- Bonda Mani
- Vadivel Balaji
- Samarth Hassan
- Uma Riyaz Khan
- Abhinayashree
- Lollu Sabha Udhay as CID officer
- Suruli Manohar as kidnapper
- Latha Rao as Srishanth's mother
- R. Selvan as Srishanth's father
- Madhumaaran as auto driver
- Shyam Ganesh

== Soundtrack ==
All music is composed by Karthik Acharya.

Track listing
No.	Title	Singer(s)	Length
1.	"Saiya Saiya"	Chinmayi, Suchith Suresan	4:37
2.	"Goganika"	Powerstar Srinivasan, Maalavika Sundar, Murali	4:26
3.	"Lets Go"	Sandiya Sandar, Shruti Laya, Prathiba, Karthik Acharya	4:22
4.	"Thudikkum"	Prathiba	2:29
Total length:			15:54

== Reception ==
A critic from The New Indian Express wrote that "The actors seem to have had a lot of fun while making the film. But unfortunately they haven’t managed to pass even an iota of it to the viewer. Sutta Palam.. is one big yawn!" A critic from The Times of India Samayam wrote that "the film could have been shot better and told better!" A critic from iFlicks wrote that "Debutante Raju is able to portray his character in an efficient manner. He attracts the audience in the climax sequences by his acting skills. The artist who comes as the auto driver is very casual in his performance and is very expressive in the affectionate scenes". Priya Dharshini of Kalaignar TV called the film an effort by the director to make you laugh despite being an age old story.
