= Chennai Love Story =

2026 Telugu-language romantic drama film

- Theatrical release poster
- Directed by: Ravi Namburii
- Written by: Sai Rajesh
- Produced by: Sreenivasa Kumar Naidu; Sai Rajesh
- Starring: Kiran Abbavaram; Sri Gouri Priya
- Cinematography: Viswas Daniel
- Edited by: Santhosh Naidu
- Music by: Mani Sharma
- Production companies: Mass Movie Makers; Amrutha Productions
- Release date: 24 July 2026
- Running time: 179 minutes
- Country: India
- Language: Telugu
- Budget: ₹15 crore
- Box office: ₹60 crore

Chennai Love Story is a 2026 Indian Telugu-language supernatural romantic drama film directed by Ravi Namburii and written and co-produced by Sai Rajesh. The film stars Kiran Abbavaram and Sri Gouri Priya, with music composed by Mani Sharma.

The film was theatrically released on 24 July 2026 and was a major commercially successful at the box office grossing over ₹60 crore worldwide.

== Plot ==
In a railway station, Ajay breaks up with Nivedita (Nivi) on their wedding day after a three-year relationship, stating that he fell in love with another girl. Nivi spirals into depression and goes to Chennai to stay with her friends and to work. She starts drinking.

Steven Shankar, an aspiring filmmaker, arrived in Chennai for opportunities in filmmaking. He goes on a narration spree to various people but fails in the process. After friction at first, he gradually makes Nivi happy with his innocent behavior and makes her come out of depression and her drinking. In the process, Nivi falls in love with Steven. On the other hand, Steven successfully narrates a story to a producer. Nivi and Steven propose to marry. On the day of the wedding at the registrar's office, Steven meets with a fatal accident. Nivi spirals into depression again and goes to buy alcohol again.

She goes to the graveyard and scolds Steven's grave for abandoning her. After her blood touches Steven's grave, he reappears as his soul which is visible only to Nivi. She is a happy person with Steven as her companion.

Out of the blue, Ajay comes back to Nivi's life. Nivi agrees to marry Ajay in front of her mother who is in a hospital. In the end, Steven convinces Nivi to spend the rest of her life with Ajay as he states that she should be happy even in his absence. Steven's soul leaves the world while Nivi and Ajay reconcile.

== Cast ==
- Kiran Abbavaram as Steven Shankar
- Sri Gouri Priya as Nivedita "Nivi"
- Thrigun as Ajay, Nivi's ex-boyfriend
- Devi Prasad as Nivi's father
- Karuna Kumar
- Naveen Neni
- Siri Hanumanthu
- Mahendhar
- Naresh Goli
- Pooja
- P. Vasu as himself
- Deepa Shankar as Chennai CMTC Bus Passenger

== Production ==
The film was officially announced in June 2025 with the release of its first glimpse. It is directed by Ravi Namburii from a story by Sai Rajesh and is produced by SKN and Sai Rajesh under the banners Amrutha Productions and Mass Movie Makers.

Principal photography began in 2025, with a major filming schedule completed in December 2025.

== Music ==
The film's music is composed by Mani Sharma. During the film's audio launch, Sharma described the project as an important milestone in his career and credited Sai Rajesh for encouraging him to compose for the film.

== Release ==
Chennai Love Story was theatrically released on 24 July 2026. The film received UA16+ certification from CBFC.

=== Distribution ===
Mythri Movie Makers is responsible for the film's distribution in the Nizam region.

== Reception ==
The Hollywood Reporter India was critical, calling it an "exhausting three-hour weep-fest".
