= Pelli SandaD =

2021 Indian film by K. Raghavendra Rao

- Official release poster
- Directed by: Gowri Ronanki
- Written by: Shiva Shakti Datta; Sreedhar Seepana
- Produced by: Madhavi Kovelamudi; Shobu Yarlagadda; Prasad Devineni
- Starring: Roshan Meka; Sreeleela; Shivani Rajashekar
- Cinematography: Sunil Kumar Nama
- Edited by: Tammiraju
- Music by: M. M. Keeravani
- Production companies: RK Film Associates; Arka Media Works
- Distributed by: Great India Films
- Release date: 15 October 2021
- Country: India
- Language: Telugu

Pelli SandaD (transl. Wedding celebration) is a 2021 Indian Telugu-language musical romantic comedy film directed by debutant Gowri Ronanki under the supervision of K. Raghavendra Rao. Produced by Madhavi Kovelamudi, Shobu Yarlagadda and Prasad Devineni, the film features Roshan Meka, Sreeleela, Shivani Rajashekar, and Rajendra Prasad.

The film is a spiritual sequel of the 1996 film of the same name. It marks the acting debut of Raghavendra Rao (who directed the previous film) and the Telugu debut of Sreeleela. The music was composed by M. M. Keeravani with cinematography by Sunil Kumar Nama and editing by Tammiraju. It was released on 15 October 2021.

== Plot ==
Maya is an aspirant filmmaker, who expresses interest to helm the biopic of Dronacharya awardee Vasishta. She threatens her father to commit suicide in case Vasishta does not authorize the project and tell his story. After several comical pleadings of her father, the reluctant Vashshta budges and goes down the memory to narrate his story of how he won over his love interest Sahasra. In 1996, Vasishta and Sahasra met at a wedding, and it is love at first sight for both of them. The main obstacle to their union is Sahasra's father Pattabhi Ramayya, the strict family patriarch who is completely against love marriage. How Vasishta convinces the headstrong father and proves that he is a worthy match for his daughter forms the rest of the story.

== Cast ==
- Roshan Meka in a double role as
  - Ravipati Vasishta
  - Arjun Ravipati Vasishta
    - K. Raghavendra Rao as old Vasishta
- Sreeleela as Kondaveeti Sahasra
  - Deepti Bhatnagar as old Sahasra
- Shivani Rajashekar as Maya
- Rajendra Prasad as Maya's father
- Prakash Raj as Kondaveeti Veera Venkata Pattabhi Seetharamayya, Sahasra's father
- Rao Ramesh as Vashishta's father
- Vithika Sheru as Janaki, Sahasra's sister
- Posani Krishna Murali as Kanchukatla Anjaneyulu
- Vennela Kishore as Chintu, Sahasra's fiancée
- Tanikella Bharani as Vashishta's uncle
- Annapurna as Sahasra's grandmother
- Satyam Rajesh as Priest Mangalam
- Srinivasa Reddy as Maya's father's assistant
- Raghu Babu
- Jhansi as Vashishta's Mother
- Fish Venkat as Ramayya's henchmen
- Shakalaka Shankar as Vashishta's uncle
- Pragathi as Vashishta's aunt
- Kireeti Damaraju as Ram, Sahasra's brother-in-law
- Babu Mohan as Subbayya Babai
- Hema
- Bharani

== Production ==
The film was planned in October 2020 as sequel to 1996 film Pelli Sandadi that starred Srikanth, Ravali and Deepti Bhatnagar. K. Raghavendra Rao decided to supervise the direction of the sequel with Gowri Ronanki making her directorial debut. Incidentally Srikanth's elder son, Roshan Meka, was selected to play the male lead in the sequel.

Initially, it was reported that actor Sridevi's daughter Khushi Kapoor would be the female lead opposite Roshan, but it was not finalized. In October 2020, actress Malavika Nair was signed to pair opposite Meka, but she was later replaced by Sreeleela in January 2021. Filming was completed in July 2021, and post-production began in the same month.

== Soundtrack ==
Pelli SandaD

Soundtrack album by M. M. Keeravani
- Released: 29 September 2021
- Genre: Feature film soundtrack
- Length: 21:32
- Language: Telugu
- Label: Aditya Music

M. M. Keeravani chronology
| Konda Polam (2021) | Pelli SandaD (2021) | RRR (2022) |
External audio
- Audio Jukebox on YouTube

The soundtrack is composed by M. M. Keeravani and lyrics are penned by Chandrabose. "Premante Enti" first track of the soundtrack was released on 27 April 2021 by Aditya Music. "Bujjulu Bujjulu" the second song was unveiled on 23 May. Title track "Pelli SandaD" was released on 12 August 2021, and fourth track "Madhura Nagarilo" was released on 29 September 2021, along with audio album.

Track listing
| No. | Title | Singer(s) | Length |
|---|---|---|---|
| 1. | "Premante Enti" | Haricharan, Shweta Pandit | 3:35 |
| 2. | "Bujjulu Bujjulu" | Baba Sehgal, Mangli | 3:57 |
| 3. | "Pelli SandaD" | Hemachandra, Deepu, Sravana Bhargavi | 4:32 |
| 4. | "Madhura Nagarilo" | Sreenidhi, Nayana Nair, Kaala Bhairava | 3:34 |
| 5. | "Gandharva Lokala" | Hemachandra, Sravana Bhargavi | 3:27 |
| 6. | "Hayam Vashishta" | Kaala Bhairava, Lipsika | 2:26 |
| Total length: | | | 21:32 |

== Release ==
The film was initially planned for release in September 2021, but was postponed due to COVID-19 pandemic in India. It was released on 15 October 2021. Later, it premiered on ZEE5 on 24 June 2022.

== Reception ==
Thadhagath Pathi reviewing for The Times of India rated the film with 2.5 stars out of 5 and wrote, "Pelli SandaD remains a strictly watchable fare with the lead actors coming into their own. But don't expect anything fresh or remotely logical." Y Sunita Chowdhary of The Hindu felt that "the film is a Manmohan Desai style of ending with a battle between the divine and the evil where a young, small-built Roshan has a showdown with big-bodied men amidst spears, colour and a Hanuman idol. The film can be touted as a costly showreel for Roshan and Sree Leela". Eenadu stated that soundtrack and performance of lead actors are the positives, and, screenplay, story and first-half are the negatives of the film. A reviewer of NTV criticized film's screenplay and felt that it has an outdated story. They also stated that Raghavendra Rao's acting is a minus for the film.
