= Saanve Megghana =

Indian actress (born 1997)

- Born: Hyderabad, Andhra Pradesh (in present day Telangana), India
- Education: St Francis College for Women
- Occupation: Actress
- Years active: 2019–present

Saanve Megghana is an Indian actress, who predominantly works in Telugu and Tamil-language films. She gained recognition for her roles in the films Pitta Kathalu, Pushpaka Vimanam and Kudumbasthan.

== Career ==
Saanve Megghana was born in Hyderabad. She graduated from St Francis College for Women and was set to act in a Zee Telugu television series and a television show produced by Jayasudha in which she was to play a tomboy from Telangana, but both did not enter production. She entered the film industry with a minor role in the 2019 film Sye Raa Narasimha Reddy, which ended up being her second film to release. She played a short film actress in Pushpaka Vimanam (2021) and made her Tamil debut with Kudumbasthan (2025).

== Filmography ==
=== Films ===
Key
†	Denotes films that have not yet been released

List of Saanve Megghana film credits
Year	Title	Role	Language	Notes	Ref.
2019	Bilalpur Police Station		Telugu	Telugu debut	
2019	Sye Raa Narasimha Reddy		Telugu	credited as Meghna	
2021	Pitta Kathalu	Ramula	Telugu	Released on Netflix; Anthology film; in segment Ramula	
2021	Most Eligible Bachelor	Meghana	Telugu	Cameo appearance	
2021	Pushpaka Vimanam	Rekha	Telugu		
2023	Prema Vimanam	Abhitha	Telugu		
2025	Kudumbasthan	Vennila	Tamil	Tamil debut	
2025	Tuk Tuk	Shilpa	Telugu		
2026	Anaganaga Oka Raju	Dancer	Telugu	Cameo appearance in the song "Andhra to Telangana"	
2026	Pyaar Prema Kalyanam	Pavithra "Pavi"	Tamil		
TBA	Production No 4. †	TBA	Tamil		

=== Music videos ===
List of Saanve Megghana music video credits
Year	Title	Label	Singer	Lyricist	Language	Ref.
2025	"Vizhi Veekura"	Think Music	Sai Abhyankkar, Sai Smriti	Adesh Krishna	Tamil	
