= Roshan Meka =

Indian actor

- Born: 13 March 1999 (age 27); Hyderabad
- Citizenship: Indian
- Occupation: Actor
- Years active: 2015–present
- Parents: Srikanth (father); Ooha (mother)

Roshan Meka (born 13 March 1999) is an Indian actor who works in Telugu films. He is the son of actors Srikanth and Ooha. He made his debut in a lead role with Nirmala Convent (2016) and won SIIMA Award for Best Male Debut – Telugu. He has since played the lead in Pelli SandaD (2021).

== Early life and career ==
Roshan Meka is the son of actors Srikanth and Ooha. He completed his education in The Future kids school. Meka formally trained in acting in Mumbai and moved to USA. He worked as an assistant director in Hindi cinema before foraying into acting.

He first appeared on screen in the film Rudhramadevi (2015). The following year, he made his debut as a lead in Nirmala Convent (2016), alongside Nagarjuna. Reviewing his performance, Pranitha Jonnelagadda from The Times of India called him very promising. "His diction, style and even dances are commendable for a start," Jonnelagadda added. Among other positive reviews, a reviewer from The Hindu wrote, "Roshan [...] looks an assured actor on-screen. His body language oozes confidence with sharp dialogue delivery." He went on to win SIIMA Best Male Debut – Telugu award that year.

In 2021, Meka appeared in Pelli SandaD, a spiritual sequel to the 1996 film Pelli Sandadi which starred his father Srikanth. Thadagath Pathi of The Times of India wrote, "Roshan pulls off the emotions required of him well, it's the perfect launch for him as a hero." A reviewer from The Hans India also appreciated Meka's performance, stating: "He has all the qualities of a good-looking hero. He dances very well and also emoted well in a few scenes. There is a long career for him in the industry."

== Filmography ==
Year	Title	Role	Notes	Ref.
2015	Rudhramadevi	Chalukya Veerabhadra	Child actor	
2016	Nirmala Convent	Samuel	Debut in lead role; SIIMA Award for Best Male Debut – Telugu	
2021	Pelli SandaD	Ravipati Vasishta and Arjun Ravipati Vasishta	Dual role	
2025	Champion	Michael C. Williams	Gaddar Award for Special Jury Award - Best Hero	
2026	Emo Emo Idi †	Abhay		
