= SIIMA Award for Best Male Debut – Telugu =

SIIMA Award for Best Male Debut –Telugu
- Awarded for: Best Debut Performance by an Actor in a Leading Role in Telugu cinema
- Country: India
- Presented by: Vibri Media Group
- First award: 21 June 2012 (for films released in 2011)
- Most recent winner: Harsh Roshan, Court: State vs a Nobody (2025)

SIIMA Award for Best Male Debut – Telugu is presented by Vibri media group as part of its annual South Indian International Movie Awards, for the best acting done by an actor in a leading role in his debut Telugu film. The award was first given in 2012 for films released in 2011.

== Superlatives ==
Categories	Recipient	Record
Youngest winner	Roshan Meka	Age 19 (6th SIIMA)
Oldest winner	Sudheer Babu	Age 33 (2nd SIIMA)

== Winners ==
Year	Actor	Film	Ref
2011	Aadi Saikumar	Prema Kavali	
2012	Sudheer Babu	Siva Manasulo Sruthi	
2013	Raj Tarun	Uyyala Jampala	
2014	Sai Dharam Tej	Pilla Nuvvu Leni Jeevitam	
2015	Akhil Akkineni	Akhil	
2016	Roshan Meka	Nirmala Convent	
2017	Ishaan	Rogue	
2018	Kalyaan Dhev	Vijetha	
2019	Sri Simha Koduri	Mathu Vadalara	
2020	Shiva Kandukuri	Choosi Choodangaane	
2021	Panja Vaisshnav Tej	Uppena	
2022	Ashok Galla	Hero	
2023	Sangeeth Sobhan	Mad	
2024	Sandeep Saroj	Committee Kurrollu	
2025	Harsh Roshan	Court: State vs a Nobody	

== Nominations ==
- 2011: Aadi Saikumar – Prema Kavali
  - Mano Tej – Babloo
  - Arvind Krishna – It's My Love Story
  - Abijeet Duddala – Life Is Beautiful
  - Ajay – Nuvvila
- 2012: Sudheer Babu – Siva Manasulo Sruthi
  - Rahul Ravindran – Andala Rakshasi
  - Naveen Chandra – Andala Rakshasi
  - Sumanth Ashwin – Tuneega Tuneega
  - Prince Cecil – Neeku Naaku Dash Dash
- 2013: Raj Tarun – Uyyala Jampala
  - Allu Sirish – Gouravam
  - Mahat Raghavendra – Backbench Student
  - Sree Vishnu – Prema Ishq Kaadhal
  - Adivi Sesh– Kiss
- 2014: Sai Dharam Tej – Pilla Nuvvu Leni Jeevitam
  - Bellamkonda Sai Srinivas – Alludu Sreenu
  - Sampoornesh Babu – Hrudaya Kaleyam
  - Varun Tej – Mukunda
  - Tejus Kancherla – Ulavacharu Biriyani
- 2015: Akhil Akkineni – Akhil
  - Akash Puri – Andhra Pori
  - Parvatheesam – Kerintha
  - Sathya Karthik – Tippu
  - Vijay Deverakonda – Yevade Subramanyam
- 2016: Roshan Meka – Nirmala Convent
  - Nikhil Kumar – Jaguar
  - Sandeep Kumar – Vangaveeti
  - Sagar – Siddhartha
- 2017: Ishaan – Rogue
  - Aashish Raj – Aakatayi
  - Ganta Ravi – Jayadev
  - Rakshit Atluri – London Babulu
  - Vishwak Sen – Vellipomakey
- 2018: Kalyaan Dhev – Vijetha
  - Aashish Gandhi – Natakam
  - Rahul Vijay – Ee Maaya Peremito
  - Srinivasa Sayee – Subhalekha + Lu
  - Sumanth Sailendra – Brand Babu
- 2019: Sri Simha – Mathu Vadalara
  - Anand Deverakonda – Dorasaani
  - Kiran Abbavaram – Raja Vaaru Rani Gaaru
  - Meghamsh Srihari – Rajdooth
  - Vijay Raja – Edaina Jaragocchu
- 2020: Shiva Kandukuri – Choosi Choodangaane
  - Sanjay Rao – O Pitta Katha
  - Ankith Koyya – Johaar
  - Shravan Reddy – Dirty Hari
  - Dandamudi Pruthvi – IIT Krishnamurthy
- 2021: Panja Vaisshnav Tej – Uppena
  - Pradeep Machiraju – 30 Rojullo Preminchadam Ela
  - Teja Sajja – Zombie Reddy
  - Satya – Vivaha Bhojanambu
  - Vikas Vasistha – Cinema Bandi
- 2022: Ashok Galla – Hero
  - Ashish Reddy – Rowdy Boys
  - Bellamkonda Ganesh – Swathi Muthyam
  - Harsh Kanumilli – Sehari
  - Srikanth Reddy – First Day First Show
- 2023: Sangeeth Sobhan – Mad
  - Abhiram Daggubati – Ahimsa
  - Narne Nithin – Mad
  - Ram Nithin – Mad
  - Virat Karrna – Peddha Kapu 1
- 2024: Sandeep Saroj – Committee Kurrollu
  - Akash Goparaju – Sarkaaru Noukari
  - Ankith Koyya – Maruthi Nagar Subramanyam
  - Chandra Hass – Ramnagar Bunny
  - Deepak Saroj – Siddharth Roy
  - Yuva Chandraa – Pottel
- 2025: Harsh Roshan – Court: State vs a Nobody
  - Mouli Tanuj Prasanth – Little Hearts
  - Pranav Kaushik – Patang
  - Devan – Krishna Leela
  - Manoj Chandra – Kothapallilo Okappudu
  - Vamsi Pujit – Patang

== See also ==
- SIIMA Award for Best Actor – Telugu
- SIIMA Critics Award for Best Actor – Telugu
