= Vijetha (2018 film) =

2018 film directed by Rakesh Sashi

- Theatrical release poster
- Directed by: Rakesh Sashii
- Written by: Rakesh Sashii
- Produced by: Sai Korrapati; Rajani Korrapati
- Starring: Kalyaan Dhev; Murali Sharma; Malavika Nair
- Cinematography: K. K. Senthil Kumar
- Edited by: Karthika Srinivas
- Music by: Harshavardhan Rameshwar
- Production company: Vaaraahi Chalana Chitram
- Release date: 12 July 2018
- Running time: 141 minutes
- Country: India
- Language: Telugu

Vijetha (transl. Winner) is a 2018 Indian Telugu-language action drama film, starring debutant Kalyaan Dhev, Murali Sharma, and Malavika Nair. Rakesh Sashii is the director, and Sai Korrapati and Rajani Korrapati are the producers. The film was released on 12 July 2018. Dhev won the SIIMA Award for Best Male Debut – Telugu at the 8th SIIMA for his role in the film.

== Plot ==
Ram, a careless youth, grows up oblivious to the sacrifices his father makes in order to fulfil all his desires. He falls in love with the girl living next door to him when he sees her making dosa in someone else's store to win a challenge. However, a major incident motivates him to change his ways of living and respect his father's hard work.

== Cast ==
- Kalyaan Dhev as Ram
- Malavika Nair as Chaithra
- Murali Sharma as K. Sridhar Rao, Ram's father
- Nassar as K. V. Raghunathan, A photographer
- Tanikella Bharani as Mohan Prasad, K. Sridhar Rao's friend
- Kalyani Natarajan as Lakshmi, Ram's mother
- Pragathi as Chaithra's mother
- Harshitha Chowdary as Keerthi, Ram's sister
- Sivannarayana as K. Sridhar Rao's friend
- Jayaprakash as Company Chairman
- Rajiv Kanakala as Rajiv, Chairman's 1st son
- Gayatri Bhargavi as Chairman's daughter-in-law
- Aadarsh Balakrishna as Kiran, Chairman's 2nd son
- Surya Sreenivas as Chairman's third son/Ram's brother-in-law
- Noel Sean as Ram's friend
- Kireeti Damaraju as Ram's friend
- Sudharshan as Ram’s friend
- Snigdha as Company Manager
- Satyam Rajesh as Chaithra's uncle
- Prudhvi Raj as Sub-Inspector (SI)
- Sanjay Reddy as a Businessman

== Soundtrack ==
Music was composed by Harshavardhan Rameshwar, and released on Vel Records company.

No.	Title	Singer(s)	Length
1.	"Ko Kokkoroko"	Lokeshwar	3:48
2.	"Minsarey Minsarey"	Karthik	2:31
3.	"Me Mummy"	Prudhvi Chandra	3:21
4.	"Salaam Salaam"	L. V. Revanth	3:50
5.	"Adugaduguna"	Kaala Bhairava	2:00
6.	"Aakaasaanni"	Anurag Kulkarni	2:59

== Reception ==
Neeshita Nyayapati of The Times of India rated the film 2/5 stars and wrote, "While the story of Kalyaan Dhev’s character has the potential to be a relatable coming-of-age track, it fails to engage mostly due to the actor’s inability to emote. [...] A gripping, subtle, and relatable screenplay is what the film needed and lacked majorly." Giving the same rating, Murali Krishna CH of The New Indian Express wrote, "Vijetha is the kind of film which is completely derailed by its shortcomings due to its stretched plot. It reminds us why we are tired of watching movies with outdated themes over and over again. Although it’s not an awful film, it’s thoroughly boring!" Sangeetha Devi Dundoo of The Hindu wrote, "‘Vijetha’ has a potentially heartwarming story lost in a middling narrative".
