= Priyanka Jawalkar =

Indian actress (born 1992)

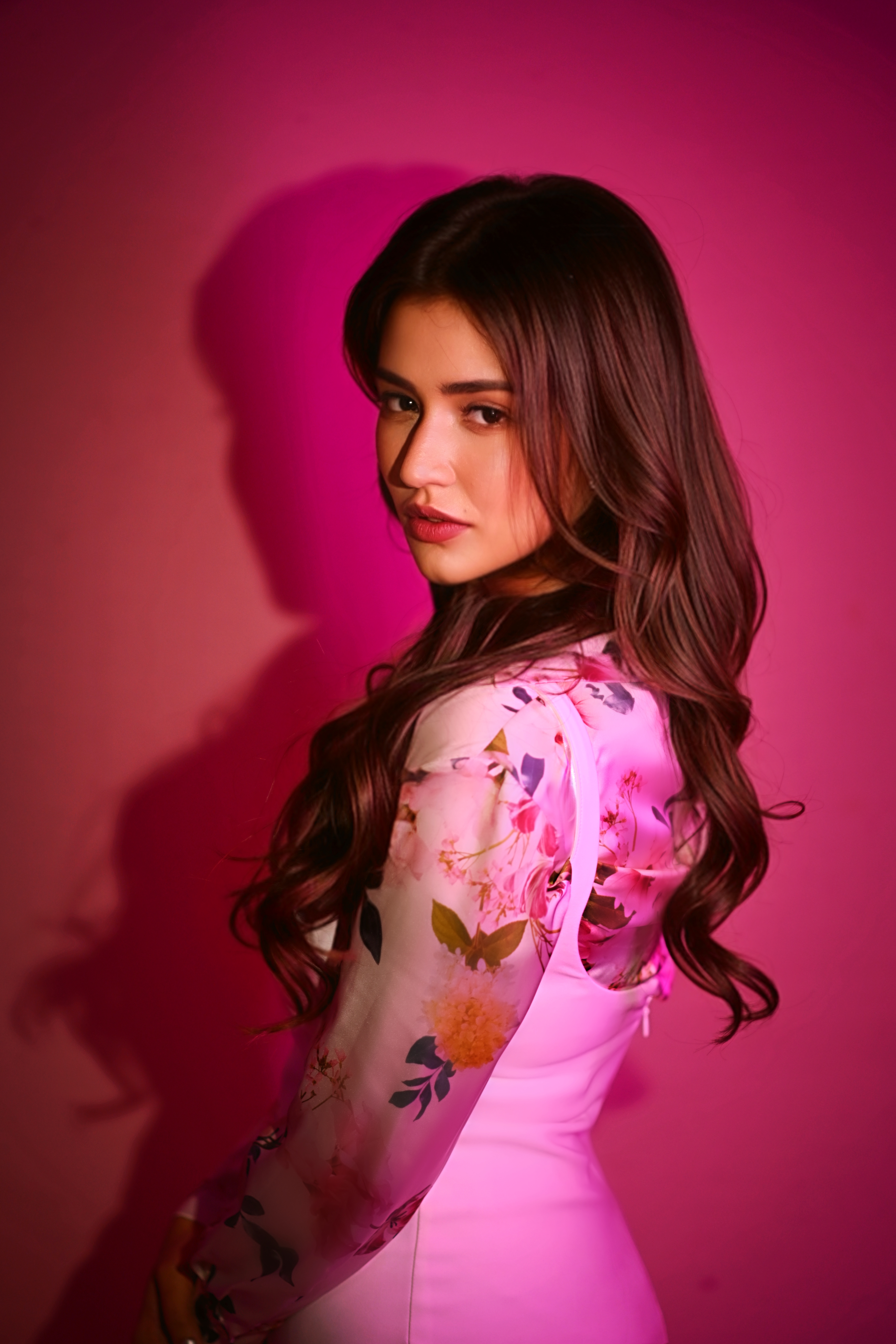
- Jawalkar in 2024
- Born: 12 November 1992 (age 33); Anantapur, Andhra Pradesh, India
- Education: National Institute of Fashion Technology, Hyderabad
- Occupations: Actress; model
- Years active: 2017—present

Priyanka Jawalkar (born 12 November 1992) is an Indian actress and model who works in Telugu cinema. She made her acting debut with Kala Varam Aaye (2017). She then appeared in Taxiwala (2018) and Thimmarusu (2021). Jawalkar received a nomination for the Filmfare Award for Best Supporting Actress – Telugu for her performance in Gamanam (2021).

== Early life and education ==
Priyanka Jawalkar was born on 12 November 1992 in a Marathi-speaking family in Anantapur,

Andhra Pradesh, India. Jawalkar, a computer science graduate, has completed a Diploma in Fashion designing from National Institute of Fashion Technology, Hyderabad. She later moved to the US for an 8-month course in statistics and worked in a company for 6 months.

== Career ==
Jawalkar was approached for roles in the films after she had uploaded a few of her photos on social media. Immediately after that, she got an offer to do short films. She did two short films namely Possessiveness and It's A Girl Issue which fetched her a lot of attention. After she completed her eight-month statistics course at Harvard in the US, she decided to pursue an acting career. In 2016, she joined acting classes for four months. After her training, her photos were sent to Geetha Arts. She made her acting debut in 2017 Telugu-language film Kala Varam Aaye, opposite Sanjeev SKJ. She then appeared opposite Vijay Devarakonda in the 2018 film Taxiwala. It became a box office success. The Indian Express noted, "Priyanka Jawalkar’s role was to look pretty on screen and she has done it very naturally."

Post a two-year hiatus, Jawalkar had three releases in 2021. She first appeared in Thimmarusu, a remake of the Kannada film Birbal Trilogy Case 1: Finding Vajramuni, opposite Satyadev . Deccan Chronicle said, "Priyanka Jawalkar gives a decent performance, but her role is weakly penned." She next portrayed a college student in SR Kalyanamandapam opposite Kiran Abbavaram. Times of India mentioned, "Priyanka Jawalkar is good enough in her role, giving her best with what she’s offered." Jawalkar portrayed a Muslim girl, Zara in Gamanam, her final release of the year. The New Indian Express noted, "Priyanka Jawalkar is aptly cast in her roles and delivers an earnest performances."

== Filmography ==
=== Films ===
Key
†	Denotes films that have not yet been released

Year	Title	Role	Notes	Ref.
2017	Kala Varam Aaye	Spoorthi		
2018	Taxiwala	Anusha "Anu"		
2021	Thimmarusu	Anu		
2021	SR Kalyanamandapam	Sindhu		
2021	Gamanam	Zara		
2024	Tillu Square	Herself	Cameo appearance	
2025	Mad Square	Laila		
2025	Mass Jathara	Swathi	Cameo appearance	

== Awards and nominations ==
Year	Award	Category	Work	Result	Ref.
2021	67th Filmfare Awards South	Best Supporting Actress – Telugu	Gamanam	Nominated	
