= Kalyaan Dhev =

Indian actor

- Born: Kalyaan Dhev Kanuganti; 11 February 1990 (age 36); Hyderabad, Andhra Pradesh (now in Telangana), India
- Occupation: Actor
- Years active: 2018–present
- Spouse: Sreeja Konidela (m. 2016)
- Children: 2
- Father: Captain Kishan
- Family: See Konidela–Allu family

Kalyaan Dhev Kanuganti is an Indian actor who appears in Telugu films. He made his debut as a lead in the film Vijetha (2018).

== Early and personal life ==
On 28 March 2016, he married Sreeja Konidela, younger daughter of actor Chiranjeevi. They have a daughter named Navishka. His father is Captain Kishan, a businessperson.

== Career ==
Kalyan Dhev made his debut in 2018 with the film Vijetha, alongside Malvika Nair. A critic from Hindustan Times praised Dev's performance and cited "Kalyaan Dhev makes a confident debut with Vijetha." The same year he then signed his second film Super Machi directed by Puli Vasu. After several delays, the film was released theatrically in January 2022, coinciding with the festival of Sankranti. Although his next film Kinnerasani began filming in December 2020, it was released on ZEE5 in June 2022 after several production delays. Dhev plays the role of a lawyer who takes revenge against a serial killer who kills his girlfriend.

In 2021, his next movie started filming. The film is directed by Sreedhar Seepana and also stars Avika Gor.

== Filmography ==
List of films and roles
Year	Film	Role	Notes	Ref.
2018	Vijetha	Ram	Debut as lead role	
2022	Super Machi	Raju		
2022	Kinnerasani	Venkat		

== Awards and nominations ==
Year	Award	Category	Film	Result
2018	South Indian International Movie Awards	Best Male Debut – Telugu	Vijetha	Won
