= Lover (2024 film) =

- Theatrical release poster
- Directed by: Prabhuram Vyas
- Written by: Prabhuram Vyas; Madhan
- Produced by: Yuvaraj Ganesan; Magesh Raj Pasilian; Nazerath Pasilian
- Starring: K. Manikandan; Sri Gouri Priya
- Cinematography: Shreyaas Krishna
- Edited by: Barath Vikraman
- Music by: Sean Roldan
- Production companies: Million Dollar Studios; MRP Entertainment
- Distributed by: Sakthi Film Factory
- Release date: 9 February 2024
- Country: India
- Language: Tamil

Lover is a 2024 Indian Tamil-language romantic drama film directed by Prabhuram Vyas in his directorial debut. Produced by Million Dollar Studios and MRP Entertainment, the film stars Manikandan and Sri Gouri Priya with Kanna Ravi, Saravanan, Geetha Kailasam, and Harish Kumar in pivotal roles. The story follows an alcoholic and unemployed designer, who tries to start a café business and is aggressively in love with Divya.

Filming took place between August and November 2023. The film was released on 9 February 2024, where it received positive reviews from critics.

== Plot ==
Arun and Divya's six-year relationship starts unraveling as they drift apart, raising the question of whether love can withstand such differences.

The story starts with Divya practicing surfing on Kovalam and spending time with her friends for a send-off party with their team lead, where she narrates her love story. Arun calls her to ask her where she is, and she claims that she's at a family function. However, he finds out that she is lying and barges into the party, creating ruckus. This causes Divya to call off their relationship.

Arun goes to his home, barely one at all, which is in shambles emotionally. He lives with his father, who is in an open extramarital affair, and his aging, working mother. Arun is a dysfunctional alcoholic designer whose business investments are in a loss too. Eventually, he and Divya get back together — but this vicious cycle of fight-trauma-apologies keeps repeating with the couple. Tired of this, Arun moves away from his friends, gets a job elsewhere, and tries to reconcile with Divya. His mother starts pushing him for marriage.

A new team lead named Madan, also a travel vlogger, enters Divya's life. Arun loses his job due to inappropriate conduct. Both of them lied to themselves so much that Divya finally decides to break up with Arun for good. Arun undergoes a further breakdown as his mother attempts to end her life. On Divya's birthday, she invites him to be part of celebrations.

The couple then plans a Gokarna trip where Arun desperately tries to patch things up between them, but his idea of love and commitment doesn't align with Divya's. She confesses that she's in a constant state of fear that their situation will become like his parents'. This is the trigger point that made Arun realize his mistakes, and that he needs to work on himself more rather than just clinging to their years-long relationship. After parting ways with Divya, Arun works on his alcohol and substance abuse issues, while his mom decides to file for divorce.

Two years later, Arun has realised his dream of opening up a successful designer-cafe. There, he meets Divya again, but is a different and more well-adjusted man now. Arun still remembers Divya's perfume and serves her favorite dish.

== Cast ==
- K. Manikandan as Arun
- Sri Gouri Priya as Divya Shanmugam
- Kanna Ravi as Madan Wanders
- Harish Kumar as Suhail
- Saravanan as Arun's father
- Geetha Kailasam as Arun's mother
- Nikhila Shankar as Ramya, Divya's friend and flatmate
- Harini as Aishwarya "Aishu", Divya's friend
- Pintu Pandu
- Sanjeev Sureshkumar as Ram - Arun's friend
- Arunachaleshwaran as Arun's friend

== Production ==
The inaugural ceremony of the film was launched by Vijay Sethupathi, and principal photography started in August 2023. In the same month, the team completed the first schedule. The second schedule was held at Gokarna in Karnataka. By the end of November 2023, the makers completed the entire shooting.

== Music ==
The music for the film was composed by Sean Roldan.

Lover

Soundtrack album by Sean Roldan
- Released: 2024
- Genre: Feature film soundtrack
- Length: 21:32
- Language: Tamil
- Label: Think Music
- Producer: Sean Roldan

Sean Roldan chronology
Vadakkupatti Ramasamy (2024)	Lover (2024)	Raghu Thatha (2025)

Track listing
No.	Title	Lyrics	Singer(s)	Length
1.	"Apple Crumble"	Sean Roldan, Prabhuram Vyas	Siddharth	2:57
2.	"Thaensudare"	Mohan Rajan	Sean Roldan, Shakthisree Gopalan	3:36
3.	"Usura Uruvi"	Mohan Rajan	Santhosh Narayanan	3:27
4.	"Velagaadha"	Mohan Rajan	Kapil Kapilan, Aparna Harikumar	3:22
5.	"Uyir Vaasame"	Mohan Rajan	G. V. Prakash Kumar	3:16
6.	"Vaadi En Trip"	Sean Roldan	OfRo	1:40
7.	"Ezhutha Kadhaiyo"	Mohan Rajan	Sean Roldan, Meha Agarwal	3:14
8.	"Thaensudare (Reprise)"	Mohan Rajan	Pradeep Kumar	3:36
Total length:				21:32

== Release ==
Lover was released on 9 February 2024.

== Critical response ==
Gopinath Rajendran of The Hindu wrote "Director Prabhuram does a fine job of humanising the characters amidst the exuberant highs and depressing lows of their relationship. The film spends a lot of time letting its leads be confronted and comforted by their friends, and the filmmaker does a brilliant job of showcasing both contemporary relationships and friendships. Be it the parallels, the lovely scores of Sean Roldan which amplify the mood of the film, or some fantastic performances from the entire cast, especially Manikandan and Sri Gouri Priya, the film has a lot going for it, making you look past its minute flaws." Manigandan KR of Times Now gave the film 3.5 out of 5 stars and wrote "In all, 'Lover' is a movie that might not make you laugh from start to finish. But it will most certainly hold your attention for the entire duration and get you thinking by the time it ends." M Suganth of The Times of India rated 3.5 out of 5 stars and wrote "The writing tries to be truthful, reflecting the mindset of contemporary 20-somethings when it comes to relationships."

Anusha Sundar of OTTplay rated 3 out of 5 stars and wrote "Lover packs a punch in the way towards the end. There is a lot of brooding and healing that the couple gets. The film may not cover the entire healing journey, but it makes a brutally honest case for the complexities that arise in modern-day relationships, where couples don’t shy away from saying what they feel. The screenplay stagnates at times, but overall, it makes the smallest of issues the biggest. And rightfully so. Lover is a film that takes the realistic route to show how much emotional and psychological abuse can take a toll and make people do what they do. It is a film that doesn’t advocate for time stamps in a relationship. More importantly, Lover is a film that makes you want to put yourself first before those you love and care for." Vijaya Shankar O of DT Next rated 4 out of 5 stars and wrote "Overall, 'Lover' isn't path-breaking in the genre of modern love like 'Livin' (both have the same ending), but it is made with such passion and poignantly conveys the meaning of moving on from a breakup. The film never glorifies Arun's actions and balances both people's viewpoints involved in love and states that letting go of someone takes a lot of time, patience, and understanding, and it is very much possible." Prashanth Vallavan of Cinema Express rated 3 out of 5 stars and wrote "Lover fumbles in places where it tries to wring the ‘point’ out of a scene but excels in places where a lot is unsaid or unfinished and yet a lot more shines through the subtext."
