= Nirmala Convent =

2016 film

- Movie Poster
- Directed by: G. Naga Koteswara Rao
- Screenplay by: G. Naga Koteswara Rao
- Story by: Concept Films; Likith Srinivas
- Produced by: Akkineni Nagarjuna; Nimmagadda Prasad
- Starring: Roshan Meka; Shriya Sharma; Akkineni Nagarjuna
- Cinematography: S. V. Vishweshwar
- Edited by: Madhu Manchinshetty
- Music by: Roshan Saluri
- Production companies: Annapurna Studios; Matrix Team Works
- Release date: 16 September 2016
- Running time: 144 mins
- Country: India
- Language: Telugu

Nirmala Convent is a 2016 Indian Telugu-language romantic drama film directed by G. Naga Koteswara Rao, and produced by Akkineni Nagarjuna and Nimmagadda Prasad on Annapurna Studios and Matrix Team Works. The film features Roshan Meka and Shriya Sharma in their debut in lead roles while Nagarjuna appears as himself in a crucial role. It has music composed by Roshan Saluri.

Meka won Best Male Debut – Telugu at the 6th South Indian International Movie Awards, in addition to Best Debut Actor Award at the 15th Santosham Film Awards.

== Cast ==
- Roshan Meka as Samuel Suri
- Shriya Sharma as Shanti
- Akkineni Nagarjuna as himself
- Aditya Menon as Bhupati Raja
- Ravi Prakash as Bhupati Raja's younger brother
- Sameer as Bhupati Raja's elder brother
- Surya as David Suri
- Praveen as Bulli
- Roshan Kanakala as Bhasha
- Chandrahas as Venu
- Pavan Sriram as Ravi Varma
- Riteesh as Ranga
- Prasanna Kumar as Sarpanch
- Chitti
- Lab Sarath as Church father
- L. B. Sriram as Veerigadu
- Thagubothu Ramesh
- Jogi Brothers as Betting Brothers
- Satya Krishnan as Vasundhara
- Anitha Chowdary as Mary
- Bhargavi as Indu
- Indu Anand as Principal

== Production ==
The film was shot in five schedules in Jaipur, Araku Valley, Medak, Nainital, and Chikmagalur. The film marks the lead debut of Roshan Meka, son actors Srikanth and Ooha, after Rudhramadevi in which he played as child artist. Shriya Sharma who has acted as child artist in few films also makes her debut as the lead actress. Roshan Saluri, son of music director Koti as the music director makes his maiden film composition. A. R. Rahman's son Master A. R. Ameen has debuted as a singer in Telugu. It even marks the acting debut of Roshan Meka (son of actor Meka Srikanth and actress Ooha ) and Chandrahas (son of television actor Prabhakar). Nagarjuna has crooned a special song in this film after 17 years. He previously sang for the movie Seetharama Raju (1999).

== Soundtrack ==
Nirmala Convent

Soundtrack album by Roshan Saluri
- Released: 8 September 2016
- Recorded: 2016
- Genre: Soundtrack
- Length: 18:50
- Label: Aditya Music
- Producer: Roshan Saluri

Roshan Saluri chronology
Gayakudu (2014)	Nirmala Convent (2016)

Music composed by Roshan Saluri. Music released on ADITYA Music Company. The Audio launch held at N-Convention Centre, on 8 September 2016. Allu Aravind was the chief guest; Nagarjuna Akkineni, Nimmagadda Prasad, Srikanth, Ooha, Koti, G. Naga Koteswara Rao, Roshan Saluri also attended.

No.	Title	Lyrics	Singer(s)	Length
1.	"Kotha Kotha Bhasha"	Ananta Sriram	Nagarjuna Akkineni	3:42
2.	"Mundhu Nuyya"	Chandrabose	Kailash Kher	3:48
3.	"Emo Evaritho"	Ananta Sriram	Siddharth Mahadevan	3:55
4.	"Okkosari Oo Muddhu"	Ananta Sriram	Srikanth, Damini	4:55
Total length:				18:50

== Reception ==
Pranitha Jonnelagadda from The Times of India, rated the film 2.5/5 and wrote, "Nirmala Convent has an interesting message and class to give but the highly enthusiastic students that we are, we wanted a lot more!" A reviewer from The Hindu also felt the same, stating, "The film falls short of being a memorable outing." Rating the film 2.5 of five stars, The Indian Express' Krishna Vamsi stated, "Roshan Meka and Shriya Sharma's pair gives film some freshness, but the film fails to offer anything new in terms of script." In an other mixed review, a critic from Sakshi appreciated the performances while criticising Koteswara Rao's screenplay and direction.
