= Mad (film) =

2023 film by Kalyan Shankar

- Theatrical release poster
- Directed by: Kalyan Shankar
- Written by: Kalyan Shankar
- Produced by: Naga Vamsi
- Starring: Narne Nithiin; Sangeeth Sobhan; Ram Nithin; Sri Gouri Priya; Ananthika Sanilkumar; Gopika Udayan
- Cinematography: Shamdat Sainudeen; Dinesh B. Krishnan
- Edited by: Naveen Nooli
- Music by: Bheems Ceciroleo
- Production companies: Sithara Entertainments; Fortune Four Cinemas
- Distributed by: Sithara Entertainments
- Release date: 6 October 2023
- Running time: 127 minutes
- Country: India
- Language: Telugu

Mad (stylized as MAD) is a 2023 Indian Telugu-language coming-of-age comedy drama film written and directed by Kalyan Shankar in his directorial debut. Produced by Naga Vamsi, the film has an ensemble cast of Narne Nithiin, Sangeeth Sobhan, Ram Nithin, Sri Gouri Priya, Ananthika Sanilkumar, Gopika Udayan, Vishnu Oi and Karthikeya Samala. The film was released on 6 October 2023. Mad was theatrically released on 6 October 2023, to positive reviews and became a major commercial success as well as becoming a breakthrough for the lead actors. A sequel, titled Mad Square, was released in March 2025.

== Plot ==
The film begins with a student who is going to ECE College in Hyderabad who is considering dropping out of college. The college senior Ganesh aka Laddu, tells a story about a friendship group and their experiences at college.

4 years ago, Laddu, who was like the student itself, was considering dropping out of college. He came from a village family and not used to the new exposure but has his roommate Shiva, who comes from a criminal family, joining with him. He meets his roommate Dharmodar aka DD, where DD convinces that the girls are good looking at college. This made Laddu stay. Their friendship is formed with Laddu, Shiva and DD, who also came from a different village himself. Another member called Manoj appeared, who is a playboy and a flirt. They also have a few female friends such as DD's schoolmate Radha and Jenny. Jenny encounters Ashok, a private and a lonewolf guy, and wanted to befriend him but he dismisses her off coldly. The other friends also encountered Ashok and he also dismisses them.

Meanwhile, the friendship group befriended a few seniors such as college president Chaitanya and Anthony, who is an 8th year repeated student. One day, Laddu and Shiva went to the rival college JCE college's café and wants to eat but Laddu got beaten up because they do not want anyone from ECE to enter their café. This led to a fight breakout between both colleges. It is revealed that the two colleges had a dispute 10 years ago regarding who owns that café. This was solved through a basketball match and the winner owns the café. ECE college has a reputation of losing for the past decade. DD decided to form a team and win against JCE college for that café. DD trains the players, despite not knowing anything about basketball, but neither of the players are good at basketball. One day, the ball was thrown near Ashok which he shoots from afar and scores a goal. The friendship group tries to convince him to join the team, which Ashok refuses. One the match day, the ECE college were losing until Ashok did enter, after DD convinces him and lead the team to win, which the final score was shot by DD surprisingly. Ashok ended up joining in their group and the trio: Manoj, Ashok and DD, formed their own group called MAD.

Meanwhile, Jenny, who has a crush on Ashok, tries to convince DD to at least ask Ashok to drop her off to her hostel after a late night. She thinks that Ashok does not like her and avoided her as a lab partner, and confesses that to him. Both Ashok and Jenny have a crush on one another but neither confessed to each other and expects the other to propose. Manoj takes an interest Shruthi who he met at a bus, where he actively tried to pursue her, which she turns him down, but the real truth was she does like him but wants the chase. Shruthi tells Manoj that they will not work out long term because Shruthi is studying abroad to United States. Manoj said enjoy while can for three months. During that three months, they started to fall in love with each other, and Shruthi was considering applying for college in Hyderabad for Manoj, which her sister thinks it was a dumb idea. She meets Manoj but saw him propose to another girl (it was Manoj practicing how he wanted to propose to Shruthi), which she revealed she wanted to end their fling, because she got an offer from her college in America. DD admitted at the library that no girl will like him, which the next day in class, there was a love letter for him from a secret admirer. He wants to be curious who it would be. At the hostel, he receives a call from his admirer. It was revealed her name is Vennela. At the end of first year, DD wants to meet Vennela in person, but Vennela avoided him saying he may find her unattractive in person.

Flashforward, to their final year, where DD is now the college president and Manoj is helping other boys with their love life. He has been single for three years and not been with other girls since Shruthi and him ended. DD is still speaking to Vennela but has not met her, which he wants to meet her. Ashok and Jenny still have a crush on each other but neither of them confess one another. Meanwhile, Laddu, wants to commit suicide which his friends stopped. This is because Laddu has been single for four years and mainly went to college with the intention of having a girlfriend, but every women thinks he is unattractive and undesirable. DD decided to meet Vennela, so they snuck to the ladies hostel to find her. This leads to a fight breakout, caused by Laddu and was caught by the college principle Purushottam. Meanwhile, DD wants to organise the college fest and ask his friends to help. He got Ashok and Jenny to work together as treasurers, because he knew about Ashok and Jenny's crush on each other. They found out that there is no college money so they have to find sponsors. One of the sponsor donated 4 million rupees, and they wanted to invite the sponsor.

It was revealed that the sponsor was Ashok. Although, the friends are aware that Ashok is an orphan, they did not realise he was the son of a rich businessman. He revealed that he never revealed his status because since he is the sole heir after his parents' demise, people who tried to get close to him wanted him for money. Hence, he avoided people because he thinks people on college would be the same and use him, until he met his friendship group and realised how genuine they are. Meanwhile, Shruthi returned to America and contacted Manoj. Her friend revealed that he still has feelings for her, but Manoj received a call from her sister saying that Shruthi has got a marriage proposal. DD and Ashok tells Manoj to speak to her father and convinces him. The next day, Manoj meets Shruthi's father, which he disapproves, but later approves. This is where he finds out that Shruthi loves him as well.

Laddu revealed to Manoj and Ashok that DD has become depressed because Vennela stopped talking to him after the hostel break in, and said they both should be better friends and be there for him. On the final farewell of college, DD was depressed because he wants to meet Vennela and convinces she would be there at the party. Laddu and Shiva found out who Vennela actually was and told DD. It turns out that Vennela was a fake person which was set up by Manoj and Ashok. This was because, DD said that he does not want to do commitment and bullies Manoj and Ashok for their love lives, so they wanted to do a petty prank on him. This included sending a love letter out and having an AI-generated female voice to speak to DD, which was actually both Ashok and Manoj talking to him. They gave up afterwards. They also tried to convince DD that Vennela was fake. DD was mad and got into a fight with both of them. They both revealed that they spent more time acting as Vennela than talking to their love interests. However, both Manoj and Ashok assumed that one of them has faked a love letter to DD, which was overheard by Radha. Radha revealed to DD that she was the one who sent the love letter because she always had a crush on him since their schooldays, but since that he was seeing Vennela, she did not pursue him. DD confessed he liked her as well.

Laddu explained all this to the student about how he was like him and said his college experience is the best experience in his life. The student gets a call from his mother, and he revealed he is not dropping out of college, after he was moved by Laddu's word.

== Cast ==
- Narne Nithiin as Ashok, a private and lonewolf orphan, who actually came from a rich family. He is the most introverted out of the trio.
- Sangeeth Sobhan as Damodar "DD", an extrovert and team leader in college. He came from a village and became college president during his final year. He always takes the lead when it comes to the MAD trio and their friendship group.
- Ram Nitin as Manoj, a playboy and flirt in college.
- Sri Gouri Priya as Shruthi, Manoj's love interest who went to study abroad in America.
- Ananthika Sanilkumar as Jenny Sharma, Ashok's love interest who originally sympathises with the fact that he was an orphan.
- Gopikaa Udyan as Radha, DD's schoolmate and friend, who secretly has a crush on him.
- Raghu Babu as College Principal Purushottam
- Racha Ravi as Peon
- Muralidhar Goud as Ganesh's father
- Vishnu Oi as Ganesh "Laddu", seen as the unattractive one of the friendship group. He also hails from a village himself, with this parents over worrying about him. He is also the friend that everyone cares about the most.
- Ravi Anthony Pudota as Anthony Rodriguez, class senior who has been repeating the year eight times.
- Charan Peri as Charan, senior to the gang
- Karthikeya Samala as Shiva, Laddu's roommate who has a criminal mindset due to his criminal family.
- Srikanth N. Reddy as Srikanth N. Reddy, super senior of RIE
- Raghuram Sreepada as Xerox Janardhan
- Santosh Kalwacherla as Chaitanya, a rich student president
- Kalyan Shankar in a Cameo appearance as Canteen chef
- K. V. Anudeep in a cameo appearance
- Pooja Reddy in a cameo appearance
- Gujjuru Hemanth in a Single ga undu mawa Song Backdrop and Cameo appearance

== Soundtrack ==
All music is composed by Bheems Ceciroleo.

Track listing
No.	Title	Lyrics	Singer(s)	Length
1.	"Proud'se Single"	Raghuram	Nakash Aziz, Bheems Ceciroleo	3:25
2.	"Nuvvu Navvukuntu"	Bhaskarabhatla	Kapil Kapilan	3:40
3.	"College Papa"	Kasarla Shyam	Bheems Ceciroleo, Varam, Keerthana Sharma	3:41

== Release ==
=== Theatrical ===
Mad was released on 6 October 2023.

=== Home media ===
Netflix acquired the post-theatrical streaming rights for the film, which premiered on the platform on 3 November 2023. The satellite rights were acquired by ETV.

== Sequel ==
A sequel called Mad Square was announced in 2024 and later released 28 March 2025

== Reception ==
Sangeetha Devi Dundoo of The Hindu wrote, "Watching MAD is like stepping into an engineering campus and being privy to the fun riot in the classrooms and hostels". She further praised the performances of Shobhan, Muralidhar Goud, and Vishnu Oi. Abhilasha Cherukuri of The New Indian Express rated the film 3.5 out of 5 and wrote, "Despite remnants of the campus film genre seen across MAD, one thing sets the latter apart from the rest. There is no sappy mythologising of friendship".

== Accolades ==
Award (Note: Awards, festivals and organizations are in alphabetical order.)	Date of ceremony (Note: Date is linked to the article about the awards held that year, wherever possible.)	Category	Recipient(s)	Result	Ref.
Filmfare Awards South	3 August 2024	Best Male Debut	Sangeeth Sobhan	Won	
South Indian International Movie Awards	14 September 2024	Best Comedian – Telugu	Vishnu Oi	Won	
South Indian International Movie Awards	14 September 2024	Best Male Debut – Telugu	Narne Nithin	Nominated	
South Indian International Movie Awards	14 September 2024	Best Male Debut – Telugu	Ram Nithin	Nominated	
South Indian International Movie Awards	14 September 2024	Best Male Debut – Telugu	Sangeeth Sobhan	Won	
South Indian International Movie Awards	14 September 2024	Best Debut Director – Telugu	Kalyan Shankar	Nominated	
South Indian International Movie Awards	14 September 2024	Best Lyricist – Telugu	Bhaskarabhatla ("Nuvvu Navvukuntu")	Nominated	
