= Viswa (lyricist) =

Telugu movie lyricist, music director, singer and dubbing artist

Background information
- Born: Vemuri Visweswar
- Occupations: Lyricist; Singer; Music director

Vemuri Visweswar (Viswa) is a Telugu movie lyricist, music director, singer, and dubbing artist. He has worked on more than 250 films.

His lyrics often incorporate elements from Sanskrit, English, and Hindi. He has contributed to a range of film projects, including introduction and title songs for various actors.

== Career ==
His works include lyrics for Pavan Kalyan starrer movie "OG" Fire storm song and also Guns & Roses, title songs of Mahesh Babu starrers Athadu, Dookudu, " Pokiri ", "Atidhi", Jr. N.T.R. starrers Baadshah and Temper, also Venkatesh starrers "Dhaga Dhaga" from the movie Lakshmi and "Gola Gola" from the movie Shadow, and Allu Arjun starrers "Down Down" from the movie Race Gurram, "Violin Song" from the movie Iddarammayilatho, and "You Rock My World" from the movie Arya. His other work includes "Nartanatara" from the movie Ek Niranjan, "Dole Dole" from the movie Pokiri, "Khiladi Koona" from the movie Athidhi, "Gichhi Gichhi" and "Chandramukhi" from the movie Super, "Ye Oore Chinnadana" from Bhadra, "Va Va Vareva" from the movie Bunny, "Chal Chal Re" from the movie Happy, "Mayadari Chinnodu" from the movie Devadasu, "Yedalo Yedo" and "Rock & Roll" from the movie Style. Music Video "SHEHZADI" was written,music directed,directed and produced By Vishwa Vemuri.Vishwa collaborated with(Singer /writer) Persian Artiste Vesta for this Cross-cultural music video. Viswa wrote and performed the title song Athadu. He also contributed songs such as "Don Bosco" from Amar Akbar Anthony, and ''Asha Pasham" from C/o Kancharapalem. His work includes “Ningi Chutte” from Uma Maheswara Ugra Roopasya. He turned into a composer and music director through the film Hyderabad Nawabs, and later contributed to films including Police Police and Nenu Naa Rakshasi. He composed, wrote, and sung the song "Padithinammo."

The title song of Dookudu, "Nee Dookudu," won the Big FM Best Lyrics Award for 2011. In the same year, "Chiguru Boniya" from the movie Teen Maar, which was sung and written by Viswa, also became a hit. His latest hits are "Violin Song" from Iddarammayilatho, "Down Down" from Race Gurram, and "Choolenge Aasma" from Temper movies. Viswa sang the poignant song "Kshaminchu Lakshmi" in Lakshmi's NTR, which became an instant hit. His current projects as a lyricist are the hero Naga Chaitanya Starrer Movie Thank You, in which he has written the song "Maaro Maaro," and Srinivas Avasarala's movie Nootokka Jillaala Andagaadu.

As a dubbing artist, Viswa has lent his voice to a major voice over that helps in the narrative of the Vijay Devarakonda starrer "Kingdom", Kabir Bedi in Gautamiputra Satakarni, Jackie Shroff in Sakthi, Supreeth Reddy in Chatrapathi, Prabhu in Bejawada, Ponniyin Selvan: I, Abhimanyu Singh in Rakta Charitra, Rahul Dev in Simhadri, Pasupathy in Nenunnanu, the opening voiceover in Damarukam, and many more. His baritone voice has elevated the characters of villains in many films. His latest films include lending a voice to Raza Murad in Padmaavat and legendary Hollywood actor Lloyd Owen in Thugs of Hindostan. He lent voice to the Telugu legendary superstar N.T.R. character in Ram Gopal Varma's Lakshmi's NTR, for which he was widely appreciated. He also lent his voice to Bollywood actor Sonu Sood, who played Arjuna in the magnum opus Kurukshetra. Viswa has lent his voice to legendary sound recordist and drummer Ranjit Barot, who played a savvy role with negative shades in A. R. Rahman. Produced the film 99 Songs. Viswa has dubbed for Vijay Sethupathi in the National Film Awards winning film Super Deluxe. He got special acclaim for Dubbing Actor Jayaram in KANTARA movie telugu version, and for film voiceovers in "Nootokka Jillaala Andagadu ", and Vijaya Devarakonda starrer "Freedom".

== Filmography ==
As lyricist

Filmography
Year	Film	Song	Notes
2002	Santhosham	Mehabooba	
2002	Adhrustam	Sairo Sairo, & Run Run	
2003	Satyam	Kuch Kuch	Also Singer
2003	Shivamani	Elo Elo	
2004	Mass	La La Lahirey	
2004	Arya	You Rock My World	
2005	Athadu	Adaraku	Also singer
2005	Bunny	Va Va Vareva	
2005	Super	Gichi Gichi, & Chandra Chandramukhi	
2005	Lakshmi	Dhaga Dhaga Merise	
2005	Bhadra	Ye Oore Chinnadaana	
2006	Happy	Chal Chal Re Hyderabadi	
2006	Pokiri	Dole Dole	
2006	Style	Rock & Roll, & Edalo evo	
2007	Chirutha	Chamka Chamka	
2007	Athidhi	Khiladi Koona	
2009	Ek Niranjan	Narthana Thaara	
2010	Thakita Thakita	C'mon C'mon, Thakita Thakita, & Kannire Olikenule	
2011	Teen Maar	Chiguru Boniya	Also singer
2013	Iddarammayilatho	Violin Song	
2013	Baadshah	Kalahisthe (Title Song)	
2012	Nippu	Ali Baba	
2015	Temper	Choolenge Aasma	
2018	Amar Akbar Anthony	Don Bosco	
2018	C/o Kancharapalem	Asha Pasham	
2020	Uma Maheswara Ugra Roopasya	Ningi Chutte	
2023	Thank You	Maro Maro	
2023	Nootokka Jillala Andagadu	Alasina Sanchari	
2025	OG	Firestorm, & Guns and Roses	

As dubbing artist

Filmography
Year	Film	Actor	Notes
2003	Simhadri	Rahul Dev	
2004	Nenunnanu	Pasupathy	
2005	Chhatrapati	Supreeth	
2010	Rakta Charitra	Abhimanyu Singh	
2011	Shakti	Jackie Shroff	
2011	Dookudu	Sonu Sood	
2011	Bejawada	Prabhu	
2017	Gautamiputra Saatakarni	Kabir Bedi	
2019	Lakshmi's NTR	P Vijay Kumar	
2022	Ponniyan Selvan	Prabhu	
2025	Kantara	Jayaram	
