= Teenmaar =

Teenmaar may refer to:

- Teen Maar, a 2011 film
- Teenmaar, a Telugu music genre derived from Tamil Dappankuthu
