= Gabbar Singh (film) =

2012 film by Harish Shankar

- Theatrical release poster
- Directed by: Harish Shankar
- Written by: Story: Abhinav Kashyap; Dilip Shukla; Screenplay: Satish Vegesna; Ramesh Reddy; Dialogues: Harish Shankar
- Based on: Dabangg
- Produced by: Bandla Ganesh
- Starring: Pawan Kalyan; Shruti Haasan
- Cinematography: Jayanan Vincent
- Edited by: Gautham Raju
- Music by: Devi Sri Prasad
- Production company: Parameswara Art Productions
- Release date: 11 May 2012
- Running time: 152 minutes
- Country: India
- Language: Telugu
- Budget: ₹30 crore
- Box office: est.₹120 crore

Gabbar Singh is a 2012 Indian Telugu-language action comedy film directed by Harish Shankar. It is a remake of the 2010 Hindi film Dabangg. The film stars Pawan Kalyan and Shruti Haasan. Devi Sri Prasad composed the film's music and Jayanan Vincent was the cinematographer. The plot follows Venkataratnam Naidu, a police officer who, inspired by a film character, adopts the name Gabbar Singh. (Note: A fictional character and the antagonist in the 1975 Hindi film Sholay.) Posted in a village, he faces off against a local thug aspiring to join politics who manipulates his half-brother. Gabbar Singh embarks on a mission to dismantle the thug's corrupt political ambitions and restore justice.

Made on a budget of ₹30 crore, the film was formally launched on 18 August 2011 at Hyderabad with shooting primarily held in Pollachi district.

Kalyan's performance was acclaimed for its charisma and energy, blending mass appeal with comedy, earning him the Filmfare Award for Best Actor – Telugu, the SIIMA Award for Best Actor – Telugu, a CineMAA Award, among other accolades. A sequel, Sardaar Gabbar Singh, was released in 2016.

== Plot ==
Venkataratnam Naidu lives with his mother, stepfather Naidu, and younger half-brother Ajay in Kondaveedu. His stepfather is always partial towards Ajay, much to Venkataratnam's anger. He stops caring about others' opinions and renames himself after the fictional character "Gabbar Singh." As his resentment towards his brother and stepfather grows, Gabbar Singh runs away from home. His stepfather eventually finds him and sends him to a boarding school away from Kondaveedu.

Twenty-one years later, Gabbar Singh is a police officer posted as the Circle Inspector (CI) for the Kondaveedu region. His anger towards his brother and stepfather remains unchanged, and he lives separately from them. Though he wants to live with his mother in his new house, she prefers to stay with Naidu. Ajay is a gambling addict with debts all over the village. Gabbar Singh falls in love with a handicraft vendor named Bhagya Lakshmi.

Siddhappa Naidu is a local goon who, with his uncle's help, aspires to become the MLA of the region in the upcoming by-election. He seeks nomination from the ruling party. Although Siddhappa despises Gabbar Singh for obstructing his illegal activities, he tries to win him over. Gabbar Singh refuses, stating that he knows Siddhappa's true nature and warns him. Angered by Gabbar Singh's response, Siddhappa sends goons to disrupt the Kondaveedu market yard. Gabbar Singh confronts and defeats them, reopening the market yard. Enraged, Siddhappa plans to kill Gabbar Singh, but his uncle advises speaking with the Home Minister to have Gabbar Singh transferred out of Kondaveedu. The minister denies their request and advises Siddhappa to make peace with Gabbar Singh or risk his political ambitions.

Meanwhile, Gabbar Singh proposes to Bhagya Lakshmi, but she rejects him, stating she must care for her ailing, alcoholic father and cannot marry while he is alive. Gabbar Singh returns home to find his mother dead. He attempts to make peace with his stepfather, but Naidu rejects him as an outcast. Gabbar Singh is then attacked by Siddhappa's men at a handicraft exhibition. He defeats them and confronts Siddhappa, warning him to stop interfering and declaring he will never allow Siddhappa to become an MLA.

Provoked by Siddhappa's men, Ajay brutally injures one of his creditors. Siddhappa calls the police to warn them about the fight. Gabbar Singh publicly beats his brother, disgracing him. Siddhappa tries to exploit the situation to have Gabbar Singh suspended, but Naidu resolves the issue by accepting Gabbar Singh's apology. Angered by the outcome, Siddhappa challenges Gabbar Singh, warning that something significant will happen in the next 24 hours. Gabbar Singh interrogates Siddhappa's henchmen and learns Siddhappa arranged Bhagya Lakshmi's marriage to a local merchant by bribing her father to enrage Gabbar Singh. Gabbar Singh crashes the wedding, confirms Bhagya Lakshmi's love for him, and marries her on the spot.

As a last effort, Siddhappa tries to bribe the high command for a party nomination, offering ₹5 crore. Gabbar Singh learns of this and steals the money. Ajay, in desperate need of money, is approached by Siddhappa, who offers help in exchange for Ajay's assistance in his election campaign. Siddhappa instructs Ajay to deliver a cellphone and a box of sweets to the Minister's house, unknowingly containing a bomb that kills the minister. Knowing that it was Gabbar Singh's brother behind the blast, the district superintendent suspends Gabbar Singh. Gabbar Singh confronts Naidu about the actions of Ajay. Naidu suffers a heart attack and is hospitalized, where Gabbar Singh cares for him, rekindling their bond.

Ajay, shocked by the blast, convinces Siddhappa to kill Gabbar Singh. Although he has no intention of killing his brother, he agrees to escape Siddhappa's grasp and confesses to Gabbar that he was sent to kill him. Gabbar attempts to take Ajay to the commissioner for a confession, but Siddhappa reveals he killed Gabbar's mother while searching for his money. In a final battle, Gabbar Singh storms Siddhappa's house, kills his goons, and defeats Siddhappa. Gabbar Singh then hires most of Siddhappa's henchmen for low-profile police jobs while discussing his future with Bhagya Lakshmi.

== Cast ==
- Pawan Kalyan as Venkataratnam Naidu / Gabbar Singh
  - Akash Puri as Young Venkataratnam Naidu / Young Gabbar Singh
- Shruti Haasan as Bhagyalakshmi
- Abhimanyu Singh as Siddhappa Naidu
- Ajay as Gabbar Singh's brother
- Suhasini Maniratnam as Gabbar Singh's mother
- Nagineedu as Naidu, Gabbar Singh's stepfather
- Kota Srinivasa Rao as Bhagyalakshmi's father
- Rao Ramesh as Minister Pradeep Kumar
- Brahmanandam as Recovery Ranjit Kumar
- Ali as Constable Ram Prasad aka 'Samba'
- Jaya Prakash Reddy as Police Commissioner
- Tanikella Bharani as Siddhappa Naidu's uncle
- Prabhakar as Banda Swamy
- Prabhas Sreenu as Siddappa Seenu
- Gayatri Rao As Harathi (Guest Appearance)
- Hari Teja as Bhagyalakshmi's assistant
- Prudhvi Raj as Nagaraju
- Praveen as Yakambaram, Ranjit Kumar's PA
- Saptagiri as Villager
- Dhanraj as Villager
- Fish Venkat as Siddhappa Naidu's henchman
- Harsha Vardhan as Doctor
- Vajja Venkata Giridhar as Police officer
- Narra Srinivas as Police officer
- Chammak Chandra as Villager
- Satya as Tea shop vendor
- Malaika Arora in the item number "Kevvu Keka"
- Gym Ravi as groom

== Production ==
=== Development ===
In 2011, Pawan expressed interest in remaking the Hindi film Dabangg to Telugu as he was impressed with the film. Arbaaz Khan sold the remake rights to Pawan. It was originally announced that Pawan would produce the film under his newly formed production banner "Pawan Kalyan Creative Works"; however, it was announced that Bandla Ganesh will produce the film under his banner Parameswara Cine Creations. Pawan approached Harish to direct the Telugu remake of Dabangg. Harish Shankar revealed he was supposed to direct Mirapakaay (originally titled "Romantic Rishi") with Pawan Kalyan which was dropped due to various reasons.

=== Casting ===
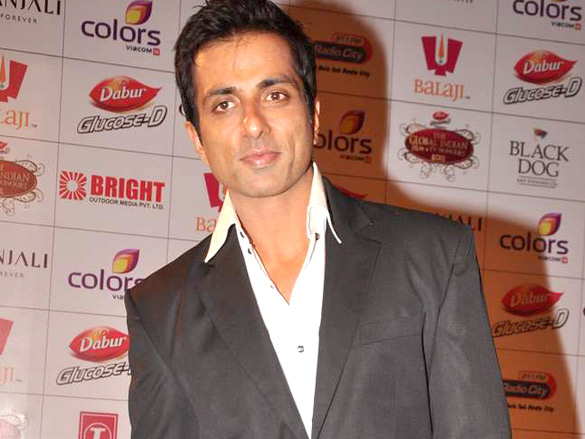
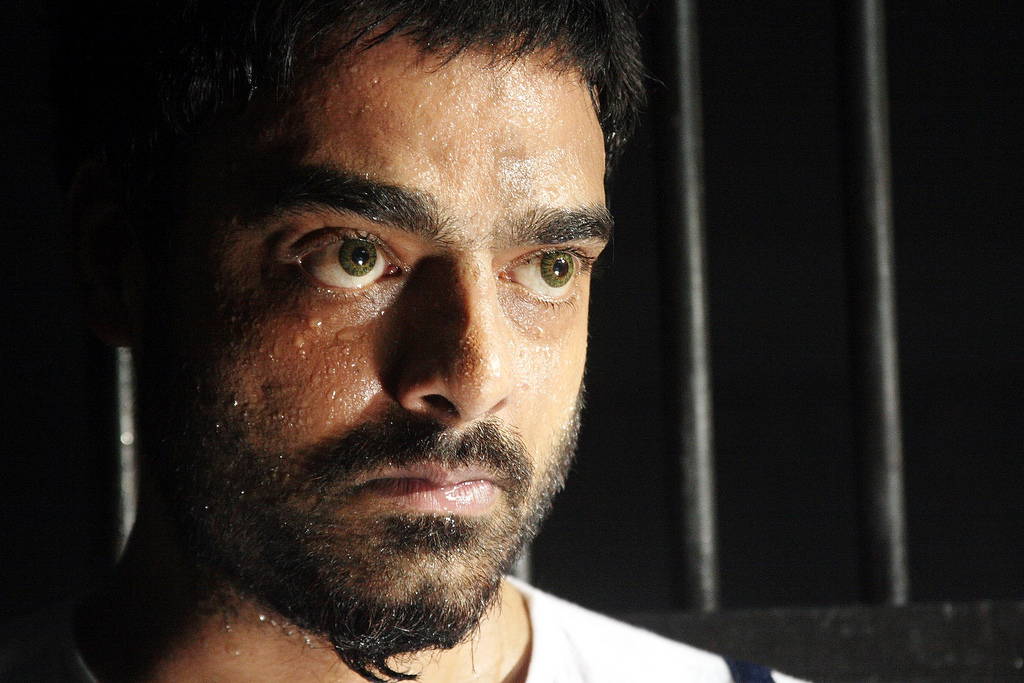
Sonu Sood (left) was originally slated to reprise his character, but he was replaced by Abhimanyu Singh (right).

Harish Shankar signed Shruti Haasan as the film's actress. Shruti had signed the film in November 2011 replacing Ileana D'Cruz who had opted out, and played the role of Bhagyalakshmi, a village girl, which had been played by Sonakshi Sinha in the original version. Parvati Melton and Malaika Arora (who performed an item number in the original movie) were finally selected to perform an item number for which the latter was reported to have been paid ₹1 crore (US$100,000); however, Ganesh denied that Malaika was paid ₹1 crore and also refused to divulge details about her remuneration. Kota Srinivasa Rao, Rao Ramesh and Jaya Prakash Reddy were selected to portray supporting roles.

== Themes and influences ==
Few dialogues were written for and uttered by Pawan Kalyan's character in the film. Dialogues like "Naku konchem thikka undi, kani daniko lekka undi" (I am crazy, but my craziness has a calculation) (Note: These dialogues are translated from Telugu to English.) epitomises the nature of the characterisation of cop roles in Telugu cinema. Director Harish Shankar defended by quoting, "Fans like to see their favourite stars doing incredible things. I just tried to tweak Pawan's character for a better audience connection. The last dialogue of Pawan in the film "Police ane vaadu...Janam lo bhayam pogottevaadu avvali, kaani jananni bhayapette vaadu kaadu" (The policeman should be the one who removes the fear in the people, but not the one who scares the people) sums up our film. I respect police officers and have made sure that we do not offend them in any way". The lyrics of the song "Kevvu Keka" draw heavily from folk literature (Jana Padams), this art form was developed by uneducated farmers who wrote those songs to entertain themselves while working in the fields.

== Music ==
The soundtrack of the film was composed by Devi Sri Prasad. On 15 April 2012, Pawan Kalyan along with Bandla Ganesh, Harish Shankar and few others visited Tirumala, where they released the first song from the film and soon after that they went to Visakhapatnam and visited Simhachalam Temple where they released the second song from the film.

== Release ==
The film was released worldwide in around 2500 theaters. Central Board of Film Certification passed the film with an 'U/A' certificate. British Board of Film Classification passed the film with a '15' rating due to strong violence.

=== Legal issues ===
KV Chalapathi Rao, State President of AP Police Officers Association said, "The red towel which Pawan Kalyan wears in one of the movie stills is the point of contention. We see municipality workers in such attire generally and it is derogatory to show a police officer in such light".

== Reception ==
=== Critical reception ===
Sify wrote, "The first half is filled with mass masala, while the second half turns hackneyed, but the drawback is instantly overcome thanks to the comedy". Rediff wrote, "Entertaining it may be, but Gabbar Singh is filled with violence and some vulgarity and not meant for the very young audience". Sangeetha Devi Dundoo of The Hindu said, "The story is formulaic. Don't expect anything out of the box. What comes as a saver is an engaging screenplay, witty dialogues and performances from the actors". Karthik Pasupulate of Times of India rated the film 4 out of 5 stars stating that: "The movie sets a new benchmark as far as "paisa vasool" goes."

=== Box office ===
The film had collected a record share of ₹27.4 crore worldwide with a record first week share of ₹25 crore from Andhra Pradesh alone. The total three weeks share of the film now stands at ₹50.45 crore. The film has grossed more than US$1 million at the United States box office. The film had earned ₹128 crore (US$13 million) gross worldwide in the first three weeks. The film has completed 50 days in 307 centres on 29 June 2012. Sources added that Gabbar Singh has also registered another record of running in 250 direct centers. The film has shattered the box office collections records and has created a new history by raking around ₹53 crore share after 50 days run.

Gabbar Singh grossed ₹150 crore (US$16 million) worldwide.

=== Accolades ===
Ceremony	Category	Nominee	Result
Hyderabad Times Film Awards 2012	Best Actor – Male	Pawan Kalyan	Won
Hyderabad Times Film Awards 2012	Best Music Director	Devi Sri Prasad	Won
TSR – TV9 National Film Awards 2012	Best Playblack Singer – Male	Vaddepalli Srinivas – "Ey Pillaa"	Won
2nd South Indian International Movie Awards	Best Film (Telugu)	Bandla Ganesh	Nominated
2nd South Indian International Movie Awards	Best Director (Telugu)	Harish Shankar	Won
2nd South Indian International Movie Awards	Best Cinematographer (Telugu)	Jayanan Vincent	Nominated
2nd South Indian International Movie Awards	Best Actor (Telugu)	Pawan Kalyan	Won
2nd South Indian International Movie Awards	Best Actress (Telugu)	Shruti Haasan	Won
2nd South Indian International Movie Awards	Best Supporting Actress (Telugu)	Suhasini	Nominated
2nd South Indian International Movie Awards	Best Actor in a Negative Role	Abhimanyu Singh	Nominated
2nd South Indian International Movie Awards	Best Comedian (Telugu)	Sreenu	Won
2nd South Indian International Movie Awards	Best Music Director (Telugu)	Devi Sri Prasad	Won
2nd South Indian International Movie Awards	Best Male Playback Singer	Shankar Mahadevan for "Akasam Ammayaithe"	Nominated
2nd South Indian International Movie Awards	Best Female Playback Singer	Mamta Sharma for "Kevvu Keka"	Nominated
2nd South Indian International Movie Awards	Best Fight Choreographer	Ram Lakshman	Won
2nd South Indian International Movie Awards	Best Dance Choreographer	Ganesh for "Dekho Dekho Gabbar Singh"	Nominated
CineMAA Awards 2013	Best Actor (Male)	Pawan Kalyan	Won
CineMAA Awards 2013	Best Comedian	Antyakshari Team	Won
CineMAA Awards 2013	Best Director	Harish Shankar	Won
CineMAA Awards 2013	Best Film	Bandla Ganesh	Won
CineMAA Awards 2013	Best Choreographer	Ganesh	Won
CineMAA Awards 2013	Best Editor	Gowtham Raju	Won
60th Filmfare Awards South	Best Film	Bandla Ganesh	Nominated
60th Filmfare Awards South	Best Director	Harish Shankar	Nominated
60th Filmfare Awards South	Best Actor (Male)	Pawan Kalyan	Won
60th Filmfare Awards South	Best Music Director	Devi Sri Prasad	Won
60th Filmfare Awards South	Best Lyrics	Sahithi Pawan – "Kevvu Keka"	Nominated
60th Filmfare Awards South	Best Playback Singer (Male)	Vaddepalli Srinivas – "Pillaa"	Won
Mirchi Music Awards South 2012	Best Album of the Year – Jury Choice	Devi Sri Prasad	Won
Mirchi Music Awards South 2012	Best Album of the Year – Listeners Choice	Devi Sri Prasad	Won
Mirchi Music Awards South 2012	Best Song of the Year – Jury Choice	"Akasam Ammayaithe"	Won
Mirchi Music Awards South 2012	Best Song of the Year – Listeners Choice	"Kevvu Keka"	Won
Mirchi Music Awards South 2012	Best Composer of the Year	Devi Sri Prasad	Won
Santosham Film Awards 2013	Best Editor	Gowtham Raju	Won

== Legacy ==
The success of the film made Shruti Haasan one of the most sought-after actresses in Telugu cinema. The film catapulted Pawan again into beckoning after his continuous failures Puli (2010), Theenmaar (2011) and Panjaa (2011). Nisha Kothari starrer Bullet Rani is said to be inspired by Gabbar Singh. Suresh Goswami, director of the film clarified that "I don't mind if my film is called the female version of Gabbar Singh, but it's definitely not a spoof. In fact, Nisha's role is inspired by Pawan's tough cop act in his film".

== In popular culture ==
The films Kevvu Keka (2012), Gunde Jaari Gallanthayyinde (2013) and Pilla Nuvvu Leni Jeevitham (2014) were named after the songs from the film. The song "Kevvu Keka" was parodied in Atharintiki Daaredi (2013). The "Antakshari" sequence was parodied in Shadow (2013), featuring "Kevvu Keka". In Naayak (2013), Siddharth (Ram Charan) and Nandini (Amala Paul) are seen watching the Bengali dub of Gabbar Singh in a theatre. In Race Gurram (2014), Lucky (Allu Arjun) and Spandana (Shruti Haasan) are watching Gabbar Singh at a cafe. The track "Pillaa" can be heard during the boardroom scene in Trivikram Srinivas's Ala Vaikunthapurramuloo (2020), with Bantu (Allu Arjun) and Sitaram (Sunil) dancing on this song.

== Sequel ==
Pawan Kalyan announced his intention to star in Gabbar Singh 2, which he would begin working on after his film Atharintiki Daaredi released in October 2013. However, the film was postponed due to the political entry of Pawan Kalyan and was set to go on floors in December 2014. The film will not be a prequel or sequel to the original Gabbar Singh, but a stand-alone film within the Gabbar Singh franchise and the film was scripted by Kalyan himself. Sampath Nandi has been named as the film's director, with Devi Sri Prasad set to compose the film's music. Anisha Ambrose was announced as the lead female role; however, she was replaced by Kajal Agarwal. The regular shooting for Gabbar Singh 2 commenced on 29 May 2015 at Malshej Ghats in Maharashtra. The film (later titled Sardaar Gabbar Singh) was released in April 2016.
