= Baadshah (2013 film) =

2013 Indian film by Srinu Vaitla

- Theatrical release poster
- Directed by: Sreenu Vaitla
- Written by: Sreenu Vaitla; Gopimohan; Kona Venkat
- Produced by: Bandla Ganesh
- Starring: N. T. Rama Rao Jr. Kajal Aggarwal; Navdeep; Brahmanandam; Kelly Dorji
- Narrated by: Mahesh Babu
- Cinematography: K. V. Guhan
- Edited by: M. R. Varma
- Music by: S. Thaman
- Production company: Parameswara Art Productions
- Distributed by: Great India Films (Overseas)
- Release date: 5 April 2013 (India)
- Running time: 164 minutes
- Country: India
- Language: Telugu
- Budget: ₹55 crore
- Box office: ₹48.5 crore distributors' share

Baadshah (transl. Emperor) is a 2013 Indian Telugu-language action comedy film directed by Sreenu Vaitla and produced by Bandla Ganesh. The film stars N. T. Rama Rao Jr. in the title role, alongside Kajal Aggarwal, Navdeep, Brahmanandam, and Kelly Dorji. The soundtrack was composed by S. Thaman, which also marks his second collaboration with Sreenu Vaitla. The cinematography and editing were handled by K. V. Guhan and M.R. Varma.

The film follows Rama Rao, an aspiring IPS officer who is rejected from the service due to his father's ties with a notorious gangster. After his brother is tragically killed in a bomb blast orchestrated by the same gangster, Rama Rao adopts the identity of Baadshah and infiltrates the criminal underworld to seek justice and dismantle the gangster's empire from within.

Baadshah was released worldwide on 5 April 2013 and was premiered at the 2014 Osaka Asian Film Festival in Japan. It was released on 1,550 screens worldwide with 1200 prints. The film became a commercial success at the box office, collecting a distributor's share of ₹48.5 crore. Brahmanandam won the SIIMA Award for Best Comedian (Telugu) for his comic performance in the film.

== Plot ==
Sadhu Bhai is a powerful international crime syndicate leader who has conquered the entire Southeast Asian underworld, with no rivals daring to challenge his authority. Dhanraj, once his trusted subordinate, runs a series of casinos in Macau, generating significant income for the syndicate. When Dhanraj attempts to transfer casino funds through Hong Kong, he is intercepted by drug lord Violent Victor’s son, Ruthless Johnny. Johnny attempts to steal the money with the help of corrupt local police, but Baadshah, Dhanraj’s son, Rama Rao, intervenes in disguise and defeats Johnny’s men.

Sadhu assigns Baadshah to rescue his henchman, Antony, who has been kidnapped. Secretly, Baadshah himself is behind the kidnapping, using it as leverage to demand control over Macau. Baadshah uses this opportunity to raid Johnny’s base, rescue trafficked children, and kill Johnny. He returns Antony to Sadhu, pretending to have saved him. In retaliation, Victor surrenders Hong Kong to Sadhu and seeks revenge. Once Sadhu discovers that Baadshah was behind Antony’s kidnapping, he plots to eliminate him.

Baadshah’s mission is to dismantle Sadhu’s empire, a task entrusted to him by IG Ramachandra, in exchange for clearing Dhanraj’s criminal charges. Ganesh, Rama Rao’s uncle, supports the operation but is killed by Sadhu’s men while protecting Dhanraj. Baadshah avenges him by eliminating Victor and his associates. Meanwhile, Sadhu plans to smuggle RDX explosives into India. IG Ramachandra dispatches DIG Balram and ACP Aadi to intercept the shipment in Hong Kong. However, Aadi betrays the force and murders Balram, framing Baadshah for the crime. He successfully transports the RDX to India. Learning about these obstacles, he meets Ramachandra and discusses them, even learning about Aadi's wedding with his niece, as well as her location.

In Milan, Rama Rao meets Janaki, a social worker as well as Ramachandra's niece, and pretends to be suicidal to get close to her. With the help of Dasu, a slacker disguised as an orphaned poet, and through encounters with failed filmmaker Nageswara Rao, Rama Rao gradually wins Janaki’s affection. Meanwhile, Sadhu’s henchman Robert tries to uncover Baadshah’s location by interrogating his allies, killing one of them in the process.

Rama Rao knows that Janaki is engaged to Aadi. He returns to India disguised as a wedding planner and enters her household, headed by her strict father, an IPS officer, Jaya Krishna Simha. Rama Rao manipulates Padmanabha Simha, Janaki’s lazy uncle-in-law, into assisting him, setting up a false “dream machine” scenario to motivate him. Rama Rao eliminates Sadhu’s bomber Rasool, and the police seize the RDX. Sadhu arrives in Hyderabad and learns Baadshah’s true identity through a police informer, Kesava, whom he kills. Janaki becomes suspicious, and Rama Rao’s mother, initially shocked by his double life, reconciles with him after learning the truth.

A flashback reveals that Rama Rao’s brother Siddhu was killed in a bomb blast orchestrated by Sadhu when Rama Rao was about to leave for the USA. Rama Rao, denied IPS entry due to his father’s criminal ties, was recruited by Ramachandra to go undercover as Baadshah to dismantle Sadhu’s empire. At the Sangeet, Aadi’s plan to expose Baadshah fails; Aadi gets exposed due to his act being caught on camera, and the wedding is cancelled. Aadi and Sadhu kidnap Ramachandra, Nageswara Rao, and Padmanabha, but are intercepted at the airport. Ramachandra declares Rama Rao as the new ACP. Rama Rao kills Sadhu and Robert, arrests Aadi, and avenges Siddhu’s death. He becomes engaged to Janaki, earning the respect of her family.

== Cast ==
- N. T. Rama Rao Jr. as Baadshah / ACP N. T. Rama Rao IPS
- Kajal Aggarwal as Janaki, a philanthropist (voice dubbed by Savitha Reddy)
- Brahmanandam as Pilli Padmanabha Simha
- Navdeep as N. Aaditya IPS
- Kelly Dorji as Sadhu Bhai
- Vikramjeet Virk as Vikram Singh
- Ashish Vidyarthi as "Crazy" Robert, Victor's brother (voiced by P. Ravi Shankar)
- Pradeep Rawat as Violent Victor
- Nagendra Babu as D. I. G. Balram, IPS
- Krishna Bhagavan as Akuvakkala Ananda Rao, Baadshah's friend
- Sayaji Shinde as I. G. Ramchandra, IPS
- Nassar as Police Commissioner Pilli Jaya Krishna Simha IPS, Janaki's father
- Mukesh Rishi as Dhanraj, Baadshah's father
- Suhasini Maniratnam as Snehalatha, Baadshah's mother
- Supreeth Reddy as Rocky Rasool, Sadhu Bhai’s right hand
- Ajaz Khan as "Ruthless" Johnny, Victor's son
- Giri Babu as Rama Chandra Murthy, Baadshah's foster uncle
- Chandra Mohan as Chandram, Baadshah's maternal uncle
- Adithya Menon as Ganesh, Baadshah's paternal uncle
- Jaya Prakash Reddy as Jayaprakash, Aadi's father
- Rajitha as Ramchandra's wife
- Surekha Vani as Padmanabha Simha's wife, Jaya Simha's sister
- Samyuktha Movva as Inky
- Ritu Varma as Pinky, Janaki’s sister
- Vennela Kishore as Dasu, Baadshah’s Friend
- Tanikella Bharani as Pilli Gopi Krishna Simha
- Pragathi as Pilli Gayatri Simha
- Sudha as Pilli Nirmala Simha
- Ravi Prakash as Pilli Radha Krishna Simha
- Brahmaji as Pilli Rama Krishna Simha
- Satya Krishnan as Pilli Supriya Simha
- M. S. Narayana as Revenge Nageswara Rao
- Vamsi Krishna as Baadshah's accomplice
- Thagubothu Ramesh as Wedding Planner
- Ajay as Baadshah's henchman
- Shafi as Baadshah's henchman
- Master Bharath
- Satyam Rajesh as Revenge Nageswara Rao's assistant
- Prudhvi Raj as Kathi Netthuru actor
- Shankar Melkote as Church Father
- Gautham Raju
- Jenny as Chettu
- Sravan as Baadshah's henchman
- Giridhar as Giridhar
- Rocket Raghava as Astrologer
- Mahesh Babu as the narrator (voice-over)
- Rajiv Kanakala as Police Informer Keshava (cameo appearance)
- Suma Kanakala as herself (cameo appearance)
- Meenakshi Dixit (item number — Baadshah title song)
- Nicole Amy Madell (item number – Kathi Kanakam song)
- Siddharth as Siddhu, Rama Rao's Brother (cameo appearance)

== Production ==
=== Development ===
While wrapping up the film Dookudu, Srinu Vaitla announced his next film with N. T. Rama Rao Jr. which would be produced by Bandla Ganesh on Parameswara Art Productions in July 2011. He further added that would take a gap of 2 months and then would start working for this film. The film was initially titled as Mafia with a tagline Manchi Kutumba Katha Chitram in the same month. But for unknown reasons the film was officially titled as Baadshah, after considering the title Action in January 2012. It was reported earlier that N. T. Rama Rao Jr. allotted the dates from February and the film would be launched in the same month. However, the film was launched on 18 March 2012 in an event held at Ramanaidu Studios in Hyderabad. The event was attended by Telugu actors Ram Charan Teja and Venkatesh. The film also marked the last film of Srinu Vaitla with Kona Venkat as he had differences with him and it was confirmed by the duo that they would never team up again in the future.

=== Casting ===
The Technical team along with the music director S. Thaman that delivered Dookudu worked for this film. N. T. Rama Rao Jr. gone lean to give a new look for his character in this film. It was also reported that N. T. Rama Rao Jr.'s character would have multiple shades in the film. Though the makers tried to rope Samantha initially, she couldn't be a part of the film due to her busy schedules. Finally the makers zeroed Kajal Aggarwal to play the lead lady's role in the film which marks her second collaboration with N. T. Rama Rao Jr. after Brindavanam. Actress Suhasini Maniratnam was signed in March 2013 to play the role of N. T. Rama Rao Jr.'s mother in the film. Mahesh Babu was reported to be the Narrator of a part of the film and after much speculation, the makers confirmed the news that Mahesh is providing Voice-over for some crucial scenes in the film. It was also revealed that Brahmanandam would play the role of a Cop in the film and his role was said to be very special in the film. Meenakshi Dixit and South African model Nicole Amy Madell were chosen to perform item numbers in the film.

=== Filming ===
Seoul, where the initial scenes were shot

Though initially planned on 15 June 2012, the principal photography started from 1 July 2012 at Milan in Italy after being shifted from Seoul. First schedule was initially said to be held in Europe. But the unit after shooting key portions at Italy shifted to Europe where two songs and some key scenes were shot. After filming for a hectic and long schedule in Europe and Italy, the unit proceeded to Bangkok. It was reported that some key scenes with a Mafia backdrop will be shot there. The film was shot extensively in Bangkok for more than 1 and a half month till 25 September 2012 and it was reported that 60% of the film's shoot was completed by then.

The new shooting schedule of the film began in a private house in Hyderabad, where few comedy scenes and other vital scenes will be canned on the lead cast. The crew returned from Bangkok and the shooting resumed in Hyderabad from the last week of September 2012. The shooting later commenced at Novotel hotel in Hyderabad where scenes on N. T. Rama Rao Jr., Mukesh Rishi and others were canned. The filming resumed in Hyderabad from the second week of October 2012. In the same month, the Introduction fight of N. T. Rama Rao Jr. was filmed at a huge set erected at the Aluminium Factory in Gachibowli under the supervision of Vijayan. After filming a few other action sequences, the unit continued its shoot in Hyderabad in November 2012 where some key scenes were shot on the lead pair as well as other actors. In December, the shoot continued at Rajiv Gandhi International Airport at Shamshabad for 3 days. In the same month, Navdeep joined the sets of the film. Later the shooting continued at a temple in Kachiguda and Daspalla Hotel in Hyderabad.

The climax of the film was shot at Nagarjuna Sagar in which N. T. Rama Rao Jr., Navdeep, Kelly Dorje and others participated for a week. Then a song on Nicole and N. T. Rama Rao Jr. was filmed at Annapurna 7 Acres Studio. After completing few patch work activities at Novotel, the shooting finally came to an end on 15 March 2013.

== Music ==
The soundtrack of the film was composed by S. Thaman, who previously worked with both N. T. Rama Rao Jr. and Srinu Vaitla. Music discussions were held in Ooty. The soundtrack consists of 6 Tracks all composed by S. Thaman with Ramajogayya Sastry penning 3 of them and Krishna Chaitanya, Viswa, Bhaskarabhatla Ravikumar penning each. The audio launch of the film was held at Ramanaidu Studios in Nanakramguda, Hyderabad on 27 February 2013 and the audio was released through Aditya Music label. The audio was a huge success and The Hexa Platinum Disc function of the film was held on 9 March 2013 at Novotel in Hyderabad.

== Release ==
Venkat Garikapati and G. Hari Kumar of Hari Venkateswara Films obtained the distribution rights of this film for Guntur and Nellore rights were acquired by Sri Nikethan Films. Bharath Pictures took the distribution rights of this film for Visakhapatnam at a record price of ₹41.0 million. The film obtained a U/A Certificate from the CBFC and was released on 5 April 2013. Benefit show tickets hungama for the film was started from 2 April 2013. The film was released in a record number of theaters in the US.

== Reception ==
=== Critical reception ===
The Times of India gave a review stating "Baadshah is a treat for N. T. Rama Rao Jr. fans, others can also enjoy this film for its comedy elements and N. T. Rama Rao Jr.'s powerful presence." Idlebrain gave a review of rating 4.5/5 stating "Baadshah is a film that serves you with Seenu Vytla kind of entertainment using N. T. Rama Rao Jr. and Brahmanandam in an effective way. N. T. Rama Rao Jr. has got a film with excellent box office potential after a long gap. It's up to the star power of N. T. Rama Rao Jr. and brand value of Seenu Vytla to take it further." SuperGoodMovies gave a review of rating 4/5 stating "N. T. Rama Rao Jr., Kajal's Baadshah is a successful entertainer for this summer. Sparkling performances from all the actors with a very much entertaining film. Sreenu Vaitla's proved with almost all projects. Complete Entertainment is assured."

== Box office ==
Being the biggest outing of NTR after two flops with, Sakthi, Dammu, expectations were very high among the audience on this film. This film was opened to great start, collecting ₹33 cr all over the world at the end of 1st week, thus emerging as the highest opener of N. T. Rama Rao Jr.'s career and got a cult status. It is also the 7th consecutive blockbuster of Sreenu Vaitla. The film has collected ₹427.1 million in three weeks worldwide. The film has collected ₹920 million worldwide. The film collected a total share WW of ₹48.5 crore. It was one of the highest-grossing films in NTR career.

=== India ===
The film has collected ₹560.2 million (net) in 40 days in Andhra Pradesh. The film has completed 50 days in 60 centres in Andhra Pradesh on 24 May 2013. The film has completed 100 days in 5 centres in Andhra Pradesh on 13 July 2013.

=== Overseas ===
The film was in the list of top 10 grossers at USA box office on 4 April 2013 collecting 234,686 USD's in 108 reported screens across USA, thus emerging as the biggest grosser among N. T. Rama Rao Jr.'s movies in USA.

== Home media ==
The VCD's, DVD's & Blu-ray's of the film were released through the Company BhavaniDVD on 19 July 2013. Maxam released the original Telugu version with Japanese subtitles on DVD on 19 December 2014, and was later reissued at a lower price on 31 March 2017. It was also released on YouTube by Volga Video in 2014.
