= Govindudu Andarivadele =

2014 film by Krishna Vamsi

- Theatrical release poster
- Directed by: Krishna Vamsi
- Written by: Krishna Vamsi; Paruchuri Brothers
- Produced by: Bandla Ganesh
- Starring: Ram Charan; Kajal Aggarwal; Srikanth; Kamalinee Mukherjee; Prakash Raj
- Cinematography: Sameer Reddy
- Edited by: Naveen Nooli
- Music by: Yuvan Shankar Raja
- Production company: Parameswara Art Productions
- Release date: 1 October 2014
- Running time: 149 minutes
- Country: India
- Language: Telugu
- Budget: ₹30 crore
- Box office: est. ₹41 crore

Govindudu Andarivadele (transl. The lord is a people's man), also known by the acronym GAV, is a 2014 Indian Telugu-language romantic action comedy film written and directed by Krishna Vamsi. Produced by Bandla Ganesh for Parameswara Art Productions, the film stars Ram Charan, Kajal Aggarwal, Srikanth, Kamalinee Mukherjee, Prakash Raj, Jayasudha, Rahman and Adarsh Balakrishna. Yuvan Shankar Raja composed the film's soundtrack and score while Sameer Reddy was the cinematographer, and Naveen Nooli the film's editor.

The film is partially inspired by the 1991 Telugu film Seetharamayya Gari Manavaralu directed by Kranthi Kumar while some parts reassemble scenes from Kabhie Khushi Kabhie Gham directed by Karan Johar. The film follows Abhiram an NRI who visits his ancestral village posing as an agricultural student while he secretly aims to reconcile his estranged father with his grandfather.

The film was officially announced in Hyderabad on 6 February 2014. Principal photography commenced from the same day and ended on 22 September 2014. A large portion of the film was shot in Hyderabad, Rameswaram, Nagercoil, Konaseema, Kanyakumari, Pollachi and Karaikudi in India while significant portions were shot in London and Jordan. The film was released worldwide on 1 October 2014 to positive reviews from critics. The film ended up as an average grosser at the box office. The film became one of the highest-grossing Telugu films of 2014.

== Plot ==
Balaraju, the head of his village, lives with his wife Baby, their two sons; Chandrasekhar Rao and Bangari, and their two daughters. He helps Chandrasekhar become a doctor and builds a local hospital. On the day it opens, Chandrasekhar comes back home with his lover Kausalya, also a doctor. Both express their wish to marry and settle abroad, which upsets Balaraju, leading to their separation.

25 years later, Chandrasekhar, a successful doctor in London, tells the story to his son Abhiram and daughter Indu. Abhiram decides to go home to Balaraju and attempt a reconciliation. He meets his friend, Bunny, at the airport and goes to the village on Bunny's bike the next day. On the way, he witnesses a cockfight organised by Bangari and Baachi; he gets the help of Balaraju to pardon Bangari and get Baachi arrested. Abhiram then introduces himself as a student from London who came here to learn agricultural practices and martial arts. He particularly impresses Balaraju's family when he saves a child's life and so is allowed to stay with them.

Balaraju's granddaughter Satya comes back from Hyderabad. Abhiram is surprised to see Satya's cultured behaviour and traditional attire, as Bunny and Abhiram previously met her in a pub in Hyderabad. She is equally surprised to see him; his cell phone contains photos showing how she spent her time at the pub. Abhiram blackmails Satya with the photos, but she then asks Bangari to get Abhiram's cell phone by telling him that Abhiram is blackmailing her. Their collective efforts fail, and Baachi is also dragged into the affair.

A fight happens between Abhiram and Baachi, deepening their rivalry. To get rid of Bangari, Balaraju arranges Chitra's marriage. Satya tells Bangari about this who then kidnaps Chitra. Abhiram chases him, saves Chitra and gets Bangari arrested. Satya finds Abhiram's phone and finds out his true identity. Abhiram offers to help Balaraju renovate the hospital he built with his father's assistance; Balaraju accepts the offer. Abhiram finds out that Satya has his phone when he goes to call his father. She deletes the photos of her. After learning that she knows the truth, Abhiram does a deal with her. They fall in love with each other. The old same they started an intimate relationship mentally and physically .

Later, Chitra, now Abhiram's friend at the house, tells him why Bangari was expelled from the house. Bangari and Chitra love one another and Balaraju does not approve of it, as Bangari is rather spoilt and drinks too much. Frustrated and intoxicated, Bangari enters Chitra's room and tells her of his attempt to rape her so as to marry her. However, Balaraju expels him from the house after catching him. Balaraju's brother-in-law and his son, Rajendra, who plan to set up a special economic zone manufacturing beer, release Bangari from jail. Abhiram's father sends the advanced equipment to Hyderabad, which Bunny and Bangari receive. Bangari attacks Bunny and seizes the equipment. Abhiram stops Bangari and his men and reveals his identity. Bangari realises what he has done and reconciles with Balaraju. The equipment is unloaded at the hospital.

Indu too visits Balaraju's house. Satya gets engaged to an American NRI doctor. However, she tells Abhiram that she would die if she doesn't marry him. He decides to break up with her and upon hearing this, Bangari reveals Abhiram and Indu's identity to Balaraju, who orders Abhiram's and Indu to leave the house.

Later, Abhiram gets a phone call from his father who plans to return to the village. Suddenly, Baachi kidnaps Indu. An injured Abhiram manages to save her, but gets shot by Baachi. Bangari arrives and Abhiram prevents Baachi from being harmed by saying that Baachi too is a family member. Chandrasekhar comes to the hospital and operates on Abhiram. When Abhiram regains consciousness, Balaraju welcomes him, Indu and Chandrasekhar back into the family. The film ends with Abhiram marrying Satya and Bangari marrying Chitra, also coinciding with Balaraju and Baby's anniversary.

== Cast ==
- Ram Charan as Abhiram
- Kajal Aggarwal as Satya, Abhiram’s love interest
- Srikanth as Bangari, Chandrasekhar's younger brother and Balaraju's youngest son
- Kamalinee Mukherjee as Chitra, Bangari’s love interest
- Prakash Raj as Balaraju, Abhiram Indu grandfather and Chandrashekar's and Bangari's father
- Jayasudha as Baby; Abhiram Indu & Balaraju’s wife grandmother and Chandrashekar's and Bangari's mother
- Rahman as Dr. K. Chandrasekhar Rao, Abhiram and Indu's father and Balaraju's elder son
- Adarsh Balakrishna as Baachi
- Ayesha Kaduskar as Indu, Abhiram's sister
- Vennela Kishore as Banda Babu "Bunny"
- Rao Ramesh as Rajendra, Gurajada Krishnamurthy's friend
- Ravi Prakash as Baachi's brother
- Kota Srinivasa Rao as Balaraju's brother
- Harsha Vardhan as Chandrasekhar's friend
- Paruchuri Venkateswara Rao as Venkatachalam, Bangari's uncle
- Giri Babu as Rama Chandra Murthy, Abhiram's friend
- Krishna Bhagawan as Akuvakkala Ananda Rao, Abhiram's friend
- Brahmanandam as Bangaraju, Abhiram's friend
- Raghu Babu as Raghu, Abhiram's friend
- Posani Krishna Murali as a lawyer engaged by Balaraju's brother
- Pragathi as Lalita, Satya's mother
- Kasi Vishwanath as Kasi, Satya's father
- Satya Krishnan as Abhiram's aunt
- Sameer Hasan as Abhiram's uncle
- Bhanu Sri Mehra as Kausalya (Cameo appearance)
- Srinivas Avasarala as Dr. N. Raju "Nookaraju" (cameo appearance)
- M. S. Narayana
- Peela Gangadhar
- Viva Harsha as Bangari's friend
- Kadambari Kiran as Koduku
- Giridhar as Bangari's friend
- Raghu Karumanchi as Bangari's friend

== Production ==
=== Development ===
"We are making films for the Telugu audience so an apt Telugu title would invariably work best. But it all depends on what type of film it is. Govindudu Andarivadele is the story of an NRI who returns to his native village to reunite with his extended family, so we decided to go with the title from a hit devotional song about Lord Krishna who is everyone's beloved."

— Krishna Vamsi, regarding the selection of the film's title.

Initially, the script was not yet complete and so the project was still put on hold.

The film was initially titled Vijetha after the 1985 Telugu film which featured Chiranjeevi and Bhanupriya in the lead roles. In March 2014, the supposed story of the film was leaked onto the internet. The story was that Ram Charan played the role of an NRI who visits his joint family to bridge a gap between his father and his father's younger brother.

On 27 March 2014, when the film poster was released, the title was confirmed as Govindudu Andarivadele. In mid April 2014, Yuvan Shankar Raja was signed up as the film's composer after S. Thaman opted out because of conflicting projects. Sources reported that talks were also held with G. V. Prakash Kumar. It was the first time that Krishna Vamsi had collaborated with Yuvan Shankar Raja, with the director later informing that he had waited five years to work with the composer. Reports regarding Rajkiran being replaced by Prakash Raj because of Chiranjeevi and the altering of the original script, and that Prakash Raj was included to strengthen the Telugu cultural identity of the film were dismissed as rumours. The film's shoot was put on hold due to the climate at the shooting spot being unsuitable for children acting in the film rather than because of Chiranjeevi. Ram Charan, in an interview with The Hindu, said that Rajkiran was replaced with Prakash Raj as the sections involving the former ended up looking more like a Tamil film.

=== Casting ===
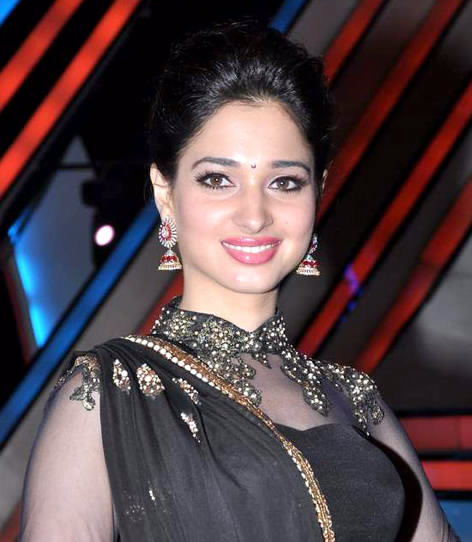
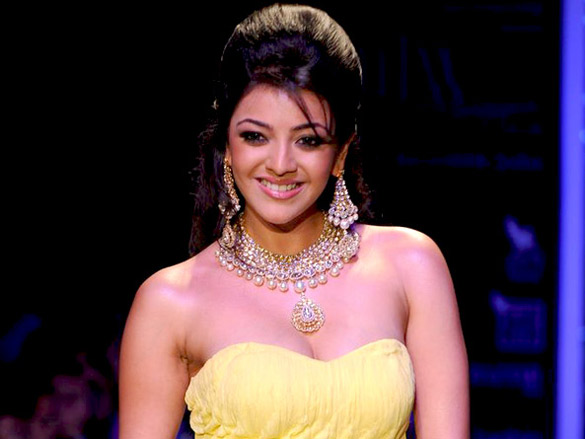
Tamannaah (top) was initially approached for the female lead role, but Kajal Aggarwal (bottom) ended up being engaged for the role due to the lack of the former's dates.

Vamsi wanted to cast a popular actor as the protagonist to widen the film's appeal, and approached Ram Charan because of his relationship with him since Charan's childhood. In September 2013, Kajal Aggarwal was signed to play opposite Charan. Actor Jagapati Babu turned down the role of Charan's father as he wanted to concentrate on antagonistic character roles.

In November 2013, Tamil actor Rajkiran was chosen to play the role of Charan's grandfather, previously earmarked for Krishna. The producers also began searching for a new actress in the lead role. Chandini Chowdary was rumoured to have been signed up as the female lead, but this proved not to be the case. Tamannaah was approached as well, but she had prior commitments in Aagadu and Baahubali. Kajal was finalised by the end of 2013 as Charan's heroine in this film, marking her return to Telugu cinema after a brief hiatus.

Kamalini Mukherjee was chosen by Krishna Vamsi in late January 2014 by Krishna Vamsi, mainly because of her appearance and her acting talent. A song from rock band "The Tapes" took seven to nine hours to film for a sequence in the film featuring Charan and Kajal. This was the band's first onscreen appearance. Vennela Kishore confirmed his presence in the film twice through his Twitter account.

In the end of May 2014, Prakash Raj replaced Rajkiran as Ram Charan's grandfather. Vamsi said "Raj Kiran was cast initially and I had doubts about this casting. After shooting a few scenes, I went to Chiranjeevi and he suggested, 'You can think of taking someone who can carry Telugu nativity.' He just made that suggestion, but that was when I replaced Raj Kiran with Prakash Raj". He added that Chiranjeevi did not interfere in this decision. However, Chiranjeevi helped Vamsi and Raj reconcile their differences. Jayasudha and Rahman were signed for key roles. M. S. Narayana was selected to play a supporting role. Adarsh Balakrishna was selected to portray the film's antagonist, recommended by Srikanth to Vamsi.

=== Characterisation ===
Ram Charan's character was Abhiram, an NRI who goes from London to India in search of his roots. He was depicted as the star player of a professional rugby league footballer at Hemel Hempstead. Charan grew a ponytail, and he also learnt stick fighting skills for the film.

Vamsi showed Charan a lot of family dramas, drove him to villages to help him understand the atmosphere and mindset of the people. According to Vamsi, Charan "comes across as a shy and reserved guy but has a fun and family loving side to him", which he tried to show onscreen. Srikanth played the role of Charan's younger paternal uncle and wore his hair long for the role. His costume was rustic in appearance. A still of him in costume was shown in the end of July 2014. His "crucial role" in the film was aggressive and rebellious.

Kajal Aggarwal revealed one of her outfits in the film on 27 July 2014 would be a black half-sari. Jayasudha was selected to play the role of Prakash Raj's wife in the film while Rahman was signed in to play the role of Ram Charan's father. Kamalini Mukherjee's character was named Chitra, a rural girl quite unlike the urbane roles she had played in the past. Adarsh Balakrishna, cast as a flashy M. P.'s son living in the same village, wore jewellery with Indian costume, again with long hair.

=== Filming ===
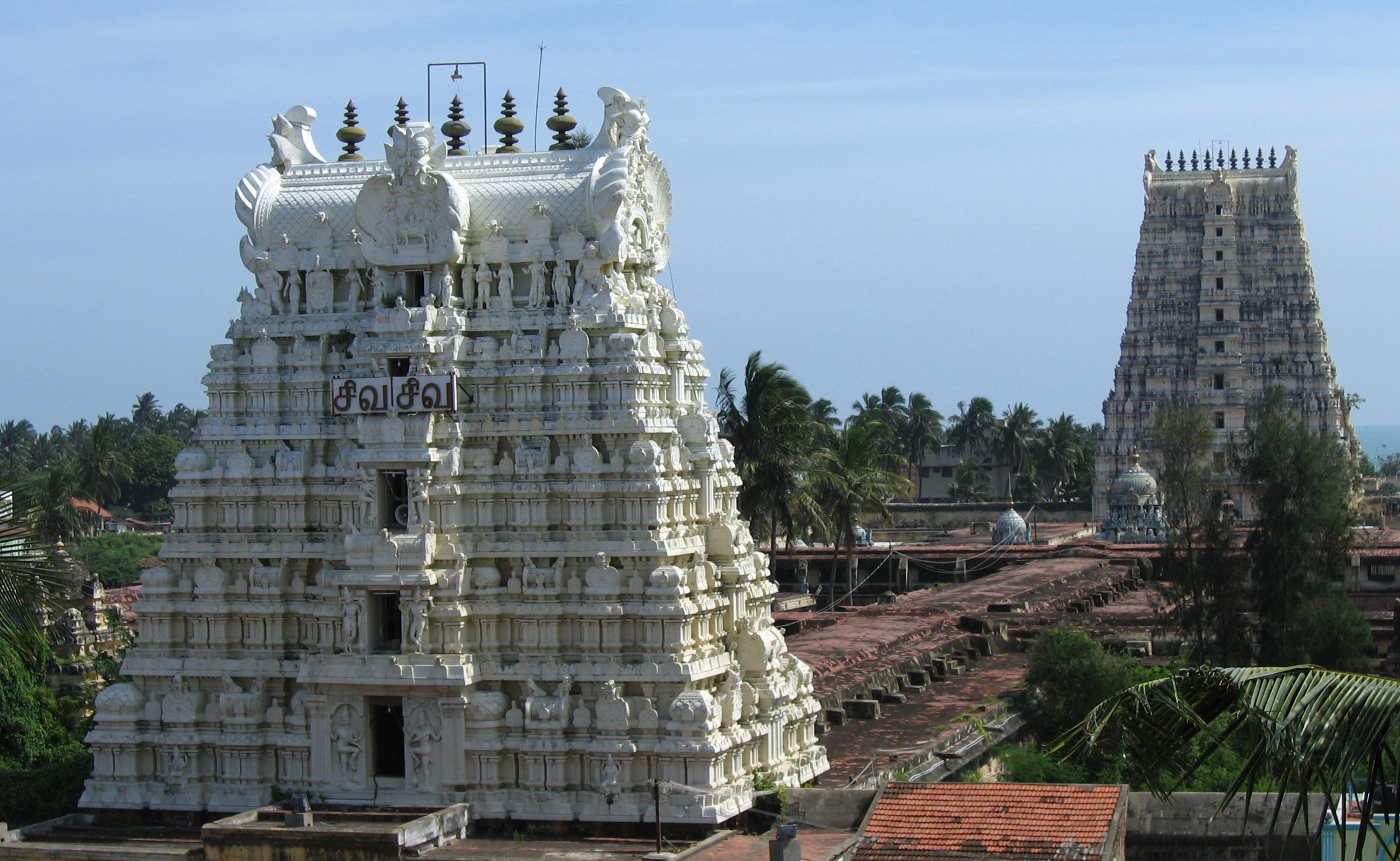
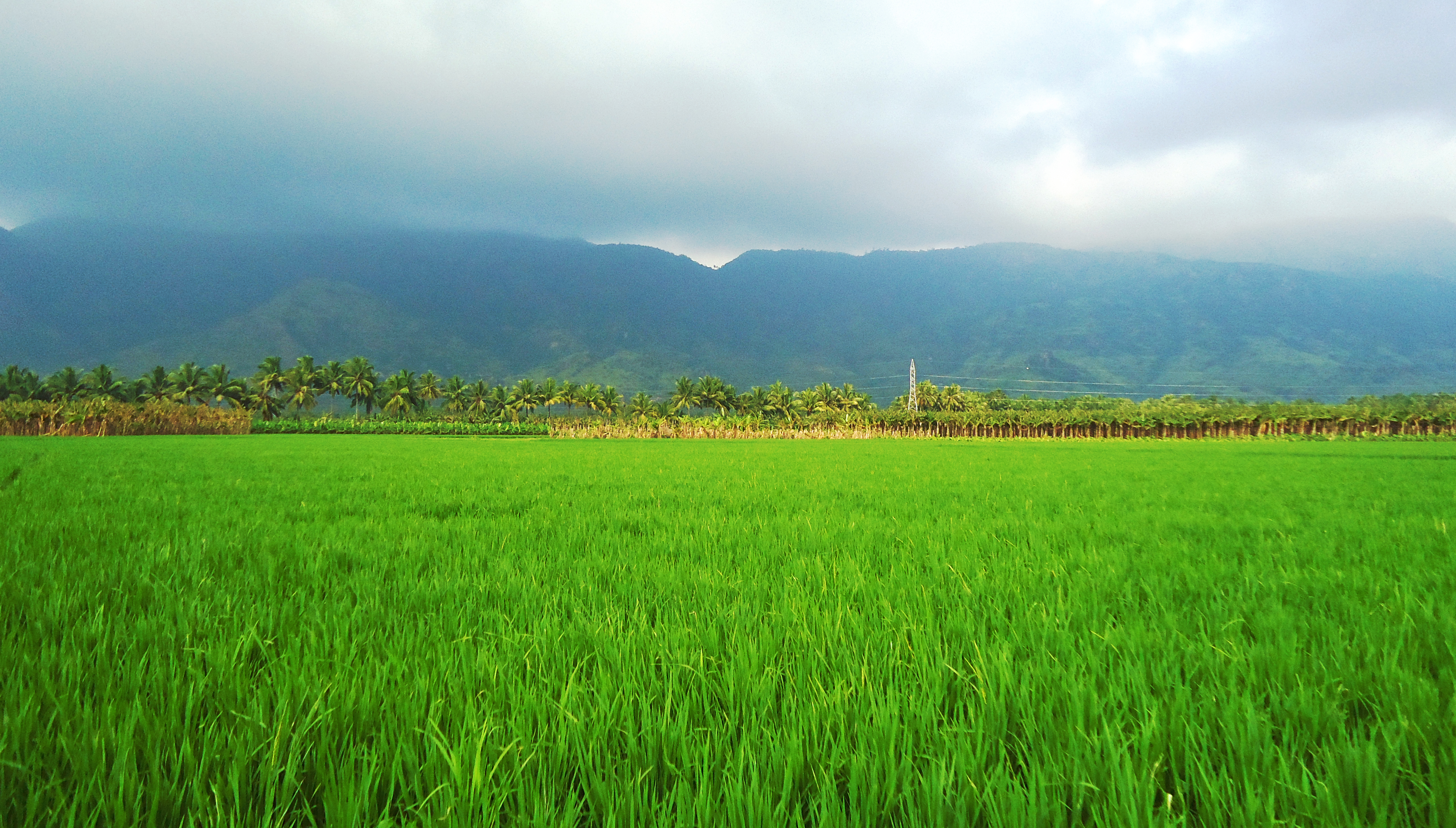
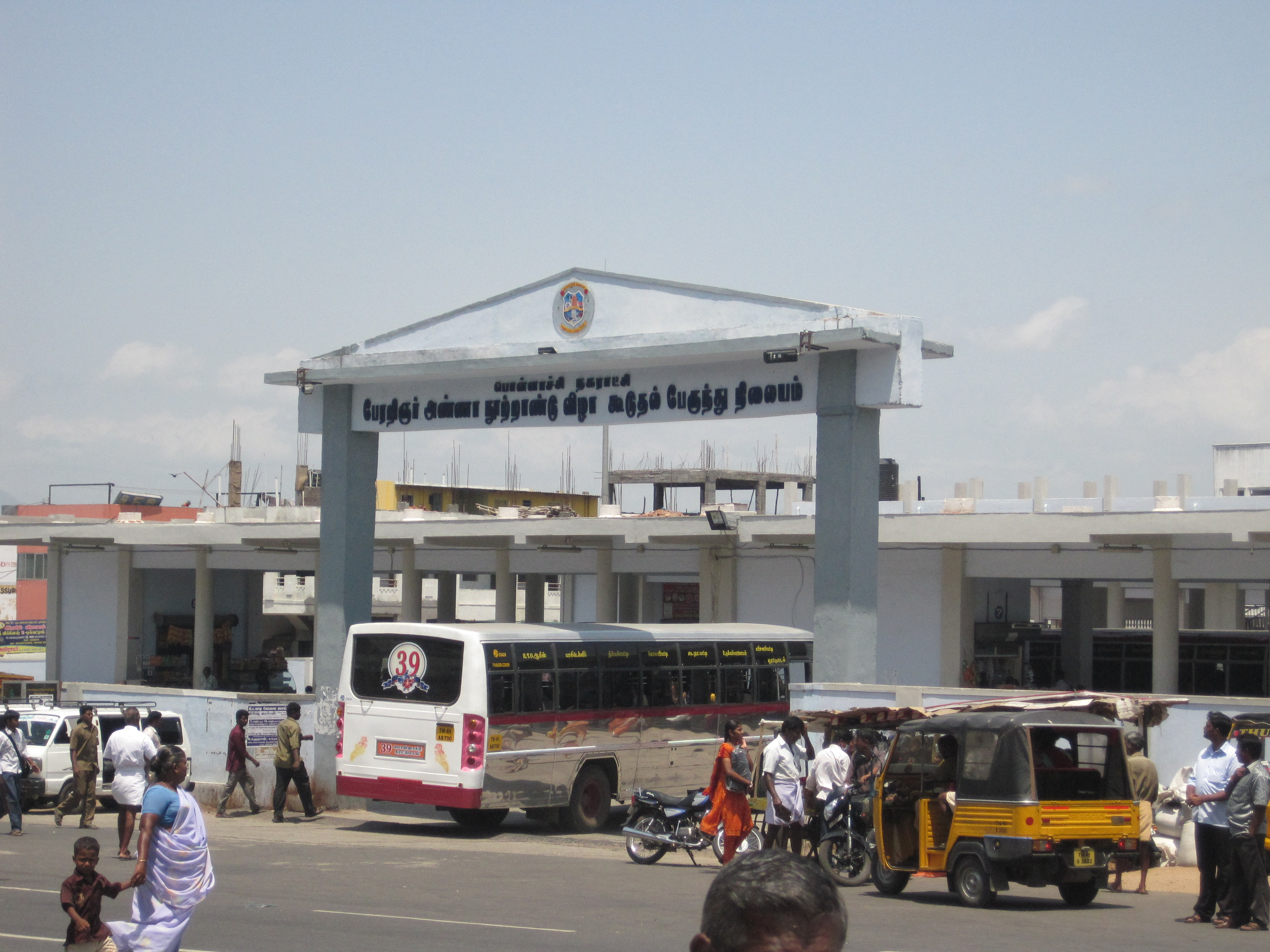
(top to bottom) The film was shot in Rameswaram, Nagercoil and Pollachi, finishing in late May 2014.

Principal photography began on 6 February 2014 in Hyderabad and continued for 3 days there before a long pre-planned schedule started in Rameswaram, Nagercoil and Pollachi. Kajal and Charan participated in the film's shoot at Nagercoil near Kanyakumari in mid February 2014 after the completion of the schedule at Rameswaram. Some song sequences were shot in Malaysia from 2 June 2014.

The film's shoot continued in Hyderabad from 5 June 2014 and the team planned to go to London after filming some family scenes at the special house set constructed earlier in Ramanaidu Cine Village in Hyderabad. 30 scenes and 2 songs were shot in that house set in Hyderabad over a period of 45 days. Prakash Raj allotted bulk dates and the reshoot took 8 days only and not 20 days as earlier reported. After completing the shoot of few scenes and a montage song, the first part of the film's Hyderabad schedule ended on 18 June 2014. The next part commenced on 21 June 2014. At the end of June 2014, another song was shot on a special set featuring mirrors, in which the lead pair participated. Due to incessant rain at Pollachi, the shooting continued at Hyderabad, delaying the planned schedule. The Pollachi schedule therefore began on 23 July 2014. A fresh schedule began in Karaikudi on whose completion, filming continued in Hyderabad from 4 August 2014. The film's shoot was temporarily halted on 19 August 2014 because of the statewide survey in Telangana.

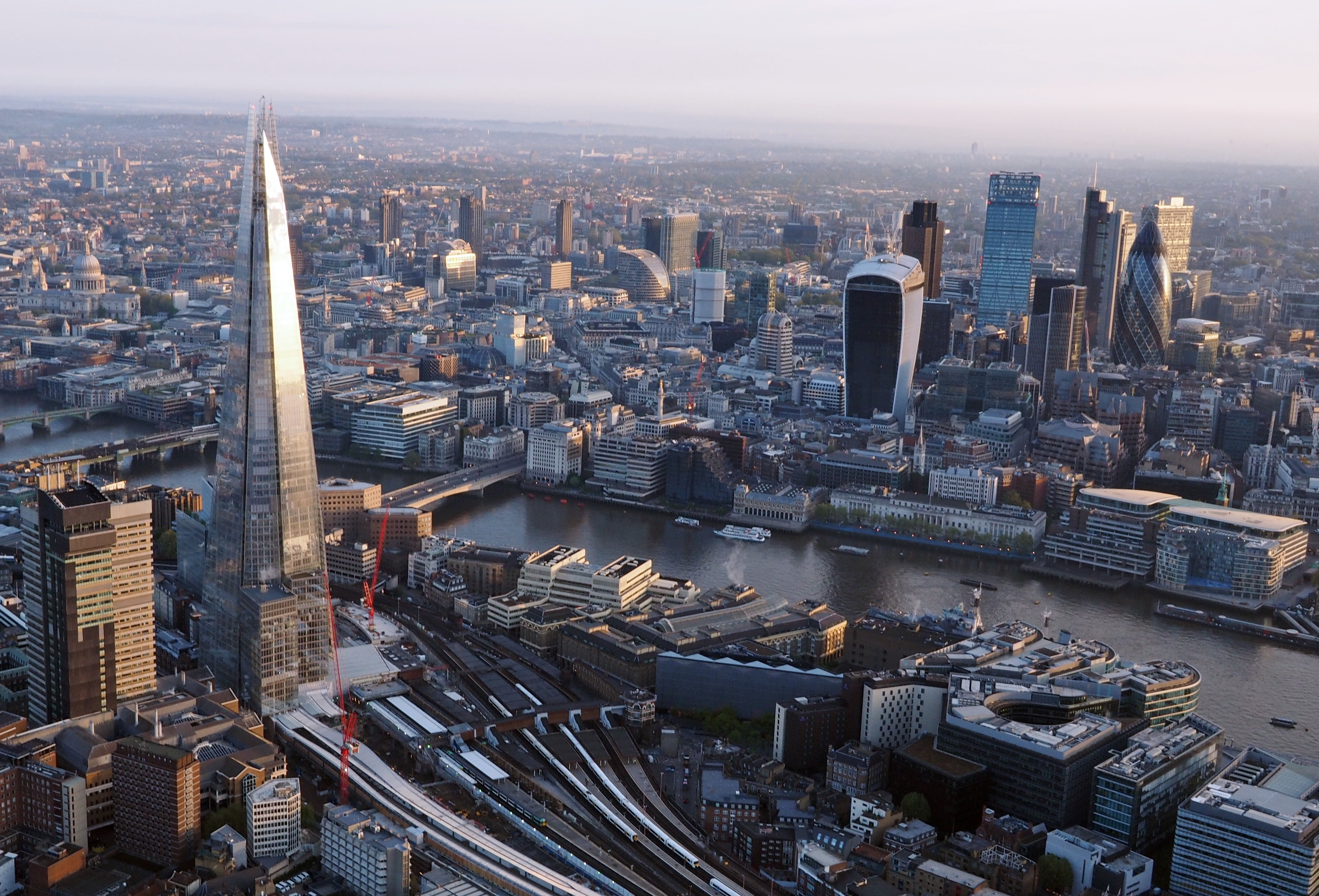
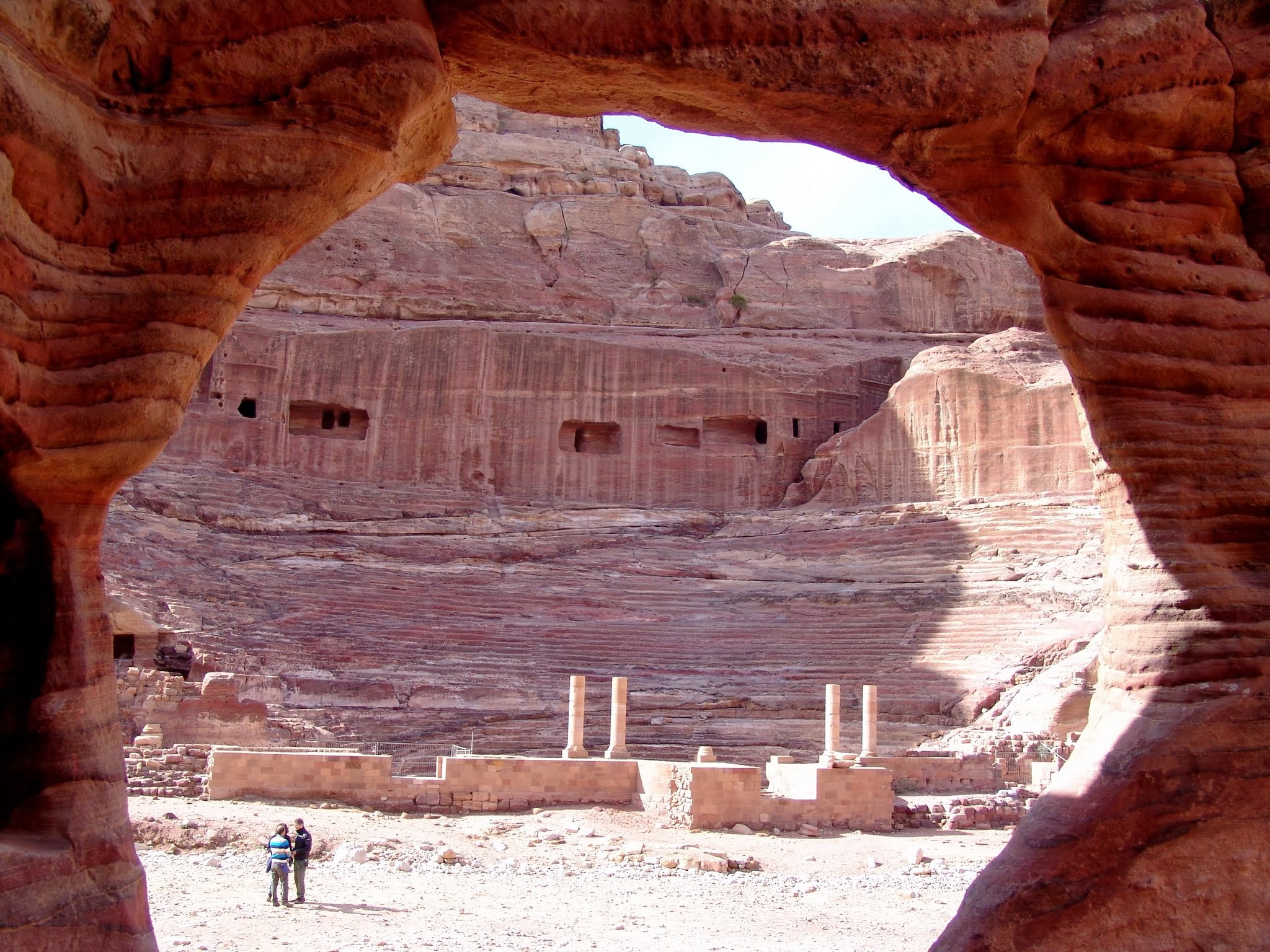
The film was shot on a specially-built set at Ramanaidu Studios, (left to right) in London and in Petra, Jordan, finishing in late September 2014. The majority of the film was shot on the house set, while a quarter of the film, including two songs, were shot in the other two places.

The next schedule began in London on 22 August 2014. A romantic song was shot on Charan and Kajal in early September 2014 in Jordan. After its completion, a song was shot with the lead pair in London. The production unit returned to Hyderabad on 14 September 2014. A quarter of the film was shot in London. Charan's introduction scene was shot at the Pennine Way Stadium, and a rugby match was shot at the Rugby League club in Hemel Hempstead in Hertfordshire in south-eastern England. To add some authenticity, the local club captain B. J. Swindells was brought on board. Two songs sequences were shot simultaneously in Hyderabad.

The principal photography ended on 22 September 2014 on completion of the songs shoot. However, it was officially announced later that the film would be released without a song which would be shot on 2 and 3 October and then be added to the film.

=== Post-production ===
The film's dubbing activities commenced at Shabdalaya Studios in Hyderabad on 18 July 2014. The supporting cast then dubbed their respective roles. Chiranjeevi personally monitored the post-production works and promotion strategies. In an interview with the Deccan Chronicle, Chiranjeevi mentioned that Charan also participated in the production and editing of the film's trailer and took extra care of the trailer's release and had asked him to check if everything was right. While shooting two songs at Hyderabad, the post production works were completed.

On 26 September 2014, the film was awarded an 'U/A' certificate by the Central Board of Film Certification instead of a clean 'U' due to some sections and scenes between the lead actors.

== Themes and influences ==
Ram Charan said in an interview that the film was partially inspired by Seetharamayya Gari Manavaralu (1991), although there were also remarks about tracing inspiration from Vamsi's previous works, Ninne Pelladata (1996) and Murari (2001). Critics also compared the film to other family dramas like Brindavanam (2010) and Attarintiki Daredi (2013).

In an interview with The Hindu, Vamsi said "Tell me one new story that has been written since Ramayana and Mahabharata. Aatma Bandhuvu (1962), Devudu Chesina Manushulu (1973), Ramarajyamlo Bheemaraju (1983) and Muddula Manavaralu (1996) — which was a remake of the Tamil film Poove Poochooda Vaa (1985) — all had a similar structure of a protagonist returning to unite a family". He added that this film was made to showcase the folk arts, music and spirituality of the Telugu people. He also drew inspiration from the husband and wife scenes shown in the film Kabhi Khushi Kabhie Gham (2001), as he wanted to incorporate the same themes into Telugu films.

== Music ==
Yuvan Shankar Raja composed the music for the film, which marked his first collaboration with Vamsi; it was also the first time he scored for a film starring Srikanth and Ram Charan. The soundtrack consists of six songs. The soundtrack received positive reviews from critics.

== Release ==
Govindudu Andarivadele was released on 1 October 2014. The makers wanted to capitalise on the long holiday of Navratri, followed by Bakrid. The film was dubbed into Malayalam and Tamil as Ekalavya and Ram Leela respectively.

=== Distribution ===
In mid-July 2014, the distribution rights of the film in the Ceded region were sold for approximately ₹81 million (US$870,000) including prints & publicity costs which, as of March 2015, is the highest amount for a Ram Charan film. The Nellore region rights were sold to Hari Pictures for a record price of ₹20 million (US$210,000). Asian Movies acquired the film's overseas distribution rights and released it in collaboration with CineGalaxy, Inc. Aakash Movies distributed the film in the UAE along with Ravi Teja's Power. Errabus distributed the film in the United Kingdom.

=== Marketing ===
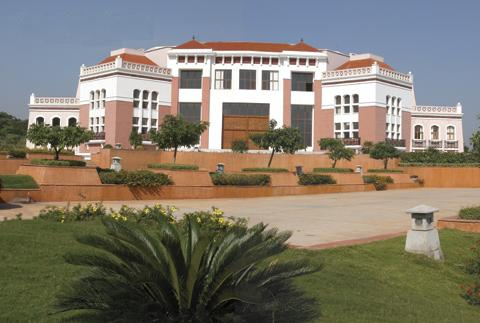
Shilpakala Vedika, where the film's theatrical trailer was unveiled along with the soundtrack album and their video promos on 1 September 2014.

The first-look posters and stills of the film were unveiled on 26 March 2014 and 27 March 2014. On 26 March 2014, 4 stills of Charan from the film were released into the Internet and received a positive response. The next day, posters designed by Working Title featuring the logo and 3 of those 4 stills were released. The posters also received a positive response and were widely distributed on various social networking sites. The film's teaser was initially planned to be launched on 29 July 2014 at Ramanaidu Studios, but the release was postponed to 7 August 2014. A promotional event was planned at Ramanaidu Studios in Nanakramguda for the teaser's launch.

The first teaser of 40 seconds was launched on 7 August 2014 with a press conference at the house set in Ramanaidu Studios where the film was shot. Reviewing the teaser, Nivedita Mishra of Hindustan Times wrote "Make no mistake, this one is no poor regional cousin of Bollywood. It's got color, good-looking stars with baddies to boot and loads of song and dance executed with a finesse that only Indian film industry can. The teaser of Ram Charan Teja's new film Govindudu Andarivadele is out and proves just that. From lush paddy fields to festive Indian family lives, this one has it all. Watch out for a shot of Ram Charan Teja riding a bullock cart! Quite novel!". The Times of India wrote "the teaser looked colorful and quite impressive reminding Krishna Vamsi's style of family and love entertainers". A set of stills were released in the last week of August 2014.

The film's official trailer was launched on 1 September 2014 at the Shilpakala Vedika along with the film's soundtrack. The trailer too received positive response. Post release, Ram Charan and Kajal participated in a special promotional program title Radhe Govinda hosted by Anasuya where they spoke about the film as a part of the film's promotion. As a marketing strategy, the makers planned to add the song Kokkokkodi to the film being screened in theatres to boost the takings.

=== Home media ===
The film had its worldwide Television premier on 21 March 2015 on the eve of Ugadi.

== Reception ==
=== Critical reception ===
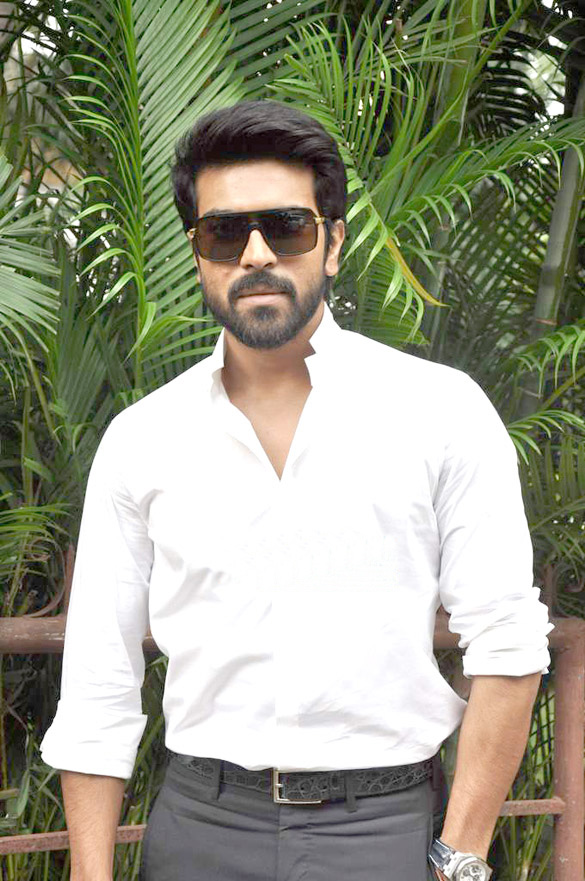
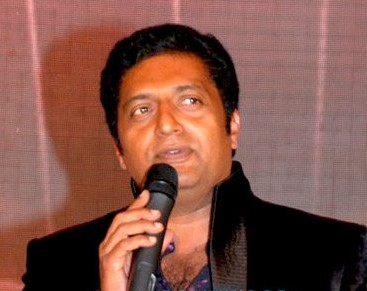
Both Charan (top) and Prakash Raj (bottom) won critical acclaim for their performances in their respective roles of a London-based NRI and his grandfather.

The film received generally positive reviews from critics. Sangeetha Devi Dundoo of The Hindu wrote "Filmmakers hope the family audience will troop in, connect with a thought, a dialogue, a character or a bond between the on-screen family members, have a good laugh, shed a few tears and get their money's worth. An old-fashioned story told reasonably well is enough to put a smile on many faces. Krishnavamsi walks this predictable path in Govindudu Andarivadele" and added "This oft-repeated tale, has shades of several family dramas told earlier in Telugu, Tamil and Hindi cinema. Yet, Krishna Vamsi makes it his own in the way he narrates it". Sandhya Rao of Sify wrote, "Overall Govindhudu Andhari Vadele is a neat family drama with the right dash of emotions. The first half is okay, but the second half surely does elevate the film to a different level. Watch GAV this festive season."

Karthik Pasupulate of The Times of India gave the film 3 out of 5 and said, "The film has some moments that stand out like Ram Charan's introduction on the rugby field, a couple of well picturised songs, a few smart one-liners and a couple of profound musings on the importance of family and overly color graded village imagery", before concluding that "the movie does offer [...] some feel good melodrama and production values that are more rich than original." Suresh Kaviyarani of the Deccan Chronicle rated the film 3 out of 5 and said, "You can watch it once for Charan's performance and it is a clean family drama. This is a holiday time and it may work out for this film." Jeevi of Idlebrain.com rated the film 3.25 out of 5 and wrote, "The heart touching content makes you eyes moist and there is entertainment too. Ram Charan should be commended to do a pure family drama when comedy and entertainment is ruling the roost".

In contrast, Subramanian Harikumar of Bollywood Life gave a mixed review saying, "Govindudu Andarivadele is an earnest attempt to dish out a clean family entertainer. But alas it's cliche ridden plot pulls it down." He felt that the film was pleasing to the eyes but lacked novelty in its novelty in story and treatment, giving the film a rating of 2.5 out of 5. Haricharan Pudipeddi, writing for IANS, gave a mixed review saying, "Govindudu Andarivadele displays Telugu filmmakers' reluctance to dig deep within a genre. There's enough material readily available from our own lives for an engaging family tale, but rarely do we come across anything realistic." and gave the film a rating of 2 out of 5.

=== Box office ===
==== India ====
Govindudu Andarivadele took a record opening at the box office. The film grossed approximately ₹86.2 million (US$920,000) in both Andhra Pradesh and Telangana together on the first day of its theatrical run. This surpassed the opening-day collections of Mahesh Babu's 1: Nenokkadine, which grossed ₹84 million (US$900,000) in the region. According to trade reports, the film amassed approximately ₹23 million (US$250,000) in Nizam while the Ceded region registered around ₹16 million (US$170,000). Collections in the East Godavari and Guntur regions were around ₹10 million (US$110,000) and ₹12.4 million (US$130,000) respectively. According to trade analyst Trinath, the film collected a total of ₹128.3 million (US$1.4 million) in India alone on its release day. The film collected a share of ₹231.8 million (US$2.5 million) in five days at the AP/Nizam region. The film managed to gross a total of ₹271.8 million (US$2.9 million) at AP/Nizam region by the end of its first week run. This took the first week worldwide collections to approximately ₹350 million (US$3.7 million) share. The film had the third-highest AP/Nizam share as well as having the top worldwide week one share, surpassing Seethamma Vakitlo Sirimalle Chettu (2013) and Race Gurram.

The film's collections slowed down on its eighth day, collecting ₹9.5 million (US$100,000) at Nizam box office alone. This took its nine-day worldwide collections to ₹363.8 million (US$3.9 million). On the next day, there was a drop of nearly 50% in the film's collections when compared to the release day because of new releases in many theatres. On that day, it collected approximately ₹40 million (US$430,000) at the worldwide box office. It witnessed subsequent growth on the second Saturday and collected ₹8 million (US$85,000) share at AP/Nizam Box office. The film grossed a total of ₹317.2 million (US$3.4 million) at AP/Nizam region in 12 days and with revenue from Karnataka, Rest of India and Overseas, the 12-day global total was ₹305 million (US$3.3 million).

The film crossed the ₹400 million (US$4.3 million) mark in two weeks with the film collecting ₹322.5 million (US$3.4 million) at AP/Nizam Box office and the rest from Karnataka, Rest of India and Overseas. It was Ram Charan's fifth film to gross in excess of ₹400 million (US$4.3 million). The film's final collections in AP/Nizam region stood at ₹338.5 million (US$3.6 million), ₹36 million (US$380,000) in Karnataka and ₹10 million (US$110,000) from rest of India. It surpassed the final collections of Legend but failed to enter the list of all-time top 10 Telugu films with highest worldwide share, ending in thirteenth place behind Eega (2012).

==== Overseas ====
The film had the biggest opening for a Ram Charan picture in the US, where it grossed ₹10.7 million (US$110,000) on its first day, according to trade analyst Jeevi of Idlebrain.com. The film grossed ₹18.5 million (US$200,000) in 2 days in the US. The film grossed around ₹7.28 million (US$78,000) on its third day in the US including reported and non-reported screens, making the film Ram Charan's highest-grossing US-released film. By the end of the first weekend, the film grossed around ₹39.8 million (US$430,000) at US Box office including rentrak and non reporting screens. It earned around ₹36.2 million (US$390,000) rentrak only from 121 locations in 5 days including Tuesday premier shows in the US. The film collected an amount of ₹32 million (US$340,000) in its lifetime at Overseas Box office.

== Awards and nominations ==
Ceremony	Category	Nominee	Result	Ref(s)
62nd Filmfare Awards South	Best Actress – Telugu	Kajal Aggarwal	Nominated	
62nd Filmfare Awards South	Best Supporting Actor – Telugu	Prakash Raj	Nominated	
62nd Filmfare Awards South	Best Supporting Actor – Telugu	Srikanth	Nominated	
62nd Filmfare Awards South	Best Male Playback Singer – Telugu	Hariharan for "Neeli Rangu Cheeralona"	Nominated	
62nd Filmfare Awards South	Best Female Playback Singer – Telugu	Chinmayi for "Ra Rakumara"	Nominated	
4th South Indian International Movie Awards	Best Film (Telugu)	Parameswara Art Productions	Nominated	
4th South Indian International Movie Awards	Best Actress (Telugu)	Kajal Aggarwal	Nominated	
4th South Indian International Movie Awards	Best Supporting Actor (Telugu)	Prakash Raj	Nominated	
4th South Indian International Movie Awards	Best Supporting Actor (Telugu)	Srikanth	Nominated	
4th South Indian International Movie Awards	Best Dance Choreographer – Telugu	Chinni Prakash for "Bavagari Choope"	Nominated	
13th Santosham Film Awards	Best Actor	Ram Charan	Won	
13th Santosham Film Awards	Best Supporting Actress	Jayasudha	Won	

== Remake ==
In mid January 2015, an associate of Prabhu Deva said he was interested in remaking the film in Hindi after watching a special screening by Bandla Ganesh. Ganesh confirmed that Prabhu watched the film and liked it. Prakash Raj was also expected to be a part of the remake as Prabhu was impressed with his performance.
