= Bandla Ganesh =

Indian actor, director and producer

- Born: Tanjore, Tamil Nadu, India
- Occupations: Actor; film producer
- Years active: 1996 - present

Bandla Ganesh, also known as Ganesh, is an Indian actor and film producer of Telugu cinema. In 2009, he ventured into film production with the film, Anjaneyulu under his production company, Parameswara Art Productions.

== Career ==
At the age of six, Ganesh settled in Shadnagar. His father was a poultry farmer. Ganesh was first inspired to act by Pawan Kalyan's appearance in 1998's Suswagatham. Ganesh started his career as a comedian in Telugu industry, mainly in Puri Jaggannadh's films.

Bandla Ganesh produced the film Gabbar Singh, which was a commercial success.

== Filmography ==
=== As producer ===
List of films produced
Year	Title
2009	Anjaneyulu
2011	Teen Maar
2012	Gabbar Singh
2013	Baadshah
2013	Iddarammayilatho
2014	Nee Jathaga Nenundali
2014	Govindudu Andarivadele
2015	Temper

=== As actor ===
- Vinodam (1996)
- Gunshot (1996)
- Aahvaanam (1997)
- Hello I Love You (1997)
- Nenu Premisthunnanu (1997)
- Sindhooram (1997)
- Osi Naa Maradala (1997)
- Ugadi (1997)
- Master (1997)
- Suswagatham (1998)
- Manasulo Maata (1998)
- Pandaga (1998)
- Love Story 1999 (1998)
- Choodalani Vundi (1998)
- Sri Ramulayya (1998)
- Manasichi Choodu (1998)
- Snehithulu (1998)
- Ganesh (1998)
- Suprabhatam (1998)
- Samarasimha Reddy (1999)
- Manasulo Maata (1999)
- Pilla Nachindi (1999)
- Swapnalokam (1999)
- Krishna Babu (1999)
- Preminche Manasu (1999)
- Anaganaga Oka Ammai (1999)
- Premaku Velayara (1999)
- Naa Hrudayamlo Nidurinche Cheli (1999)
- Manasu Paddanu Kaani (2000)
- Yuvaraju (2000)
- Madhuri (2000)
- Manasunna Maaraju (2000)
- Sorry Aunty (2001)
- Nuvvu Naaku Nachav (2001)
- Raghavendra (2003)
- Dhanush (2003)
- Amma Nanna O Tamila Ammayi (2003)
- Villain (2003)
- Sivamani (2003)
- Nee Manasu Naaku Telusu (2003)
- Athade Oka Sainyam (2004)
- Malliswari (2004)
- 143 (2004)
- Orey Pandu (2005)
- Pokiri (2006)
- Veerabhadra (2006)
- Oka V Chitram (2006)
- Yogi (2007)
- Tulasi (2007)
- Chirutha (2008)
- Chintakayala Ravi (2008)
- Nuvvu Vasthavani (2008)
- Businessman (2012)
- Sarileru Neekevvaru (2020)
- Crazy Uncles (2021)
- Degala Babji (2022)
- Son of India (2022)
- Sampradayini Suppini Suddapoosani (2026)

== Awards ==
- CineMAA Award for Best Film – Gabbar Singh (2013)
