= Anjaneyulu (film) =

2009 action comedy film by Parasuram

- Film poster
- Directed by: Parasuram
- Written by: Parasuram
- Produced by: Bandla Ganesh
- Starring: Ravi Teja; Nayantara
- Cinematography: K. Ravindra Babu
- Edited by: Marthand K. Venkatesh
- Music by: S. Thaman
- Production company: Parameswara Art Productions
- Release date: 14 August 2009
- Country: India
- Language: Telugu

Anjaneyulu is a 2009 Indian Telugu-language action comedy film written and directed by Parasuram and produced by Bandla Ganesh. The film stars Ravi Teja and Nayantara, while Sonu Sood, Nassar, and Brahmanandam play supporting roles. the music was composed by S. Thaman with cinematography by K. Ravindra Babu and editing by Marthand K. Venkatesh. The film released on 14 August 2009. The Tamil dubbed version titled Adhiradi Arjun was released in Chennai on 29 July 2016.

== Plot ==
Employed with HMTV, Anjaneyulu lives in Hyderabad and is in constant touch with his retired father Krishnamurthy and mother. His boss Sudarshan Babu hires a creative consultant, Prabhakar. Their TV channel undergoes a number of changes, and Anjaneyulu gets to interview various people. He meets with Anjali, an Airtel employee, and both dramatically fall in love. While investigating corrupt politicians, he comes across evidence and decides to join the gang of a gangster named Bada. Still involved in gathering evidence, his world will come crashing around him when he will be told his parents and many others have been killed after their bus was torched by hooligans. He sets out to trace who was responsible behind their killing - not knowing that his life is also in danger.

== Cast ==
- Ravi Teja as Anjaneyulu alias Pavan
- Nayantara as Anjali
- Sonu Sood as 'Bada' Bhai
- Nassar as Krishnamurthy
- Brahmanandam as Creative Head Prabhakar
- Suman as Anjali's father
- Sana as Anjali's mother
- Kota Srinivasa Rao as Gurudev
- Jaya Prakash Reddy as Babulal
- Jeeva as Sudarshan Babu, Anjaneyulu's boss
- Brahmaji as Subbu, a journalist and Anjaneyulu's friend
- Vinaya Prasad as Lakshmi
- Ahuti Prasad as Police Commissioner
- M. S. Narayana as Prakash
- Kadhal Dhandapani as MLA
- Srinivasa Reddy as Anjaneyulu's colleague
- Raja Ravindra as Bada's henchman
- Fish Venkat as Bada's henchman
- Tarzan as Bada's henchman
- Chalapathi Rao
- Bhuvaneswari
- Prakash Raj as Jai Prakash in a special appearance
- Kim Sharma in an item number

== Soundtrack ==
The music was composed by S. Thaman and released by Aditya Music. The song "Rajulakey Raraju" is based on the song "Uchimeedhu" from the Tamil film Sindhanai Sei, which was composed by Thaman.

Anjaneyulu

Soundtrack album by S. Thaman
- Released: July 24, 2009
- Recorded: 2009
- Genre: Soundtrack
- Length: 26:30
- Label: Aditya Music
- Producer: S. Thaman

S. Thaman chronology
Moscowin Kavery (2008)	Anjaneyulu (2009)	Eeram (2009)

Track list
No.	Title	Lyrics	Singer(s)	Length
1.	"Olammi"	Bhaskarabhatla	Karthik, Sri Vardhini	4:16
2.	"Anjali"	Chandrabose	Shankar Mahadevan, Rahul Nambiar, Megha	4:23
3.	"Em Vayaso"	Krishna Chaitanya	Naveen, Jyotsna	4:29
4.	"Dil Se Bhol"	Krishna Chaitanya	Ranjith	4:32
5.	"Rajulakey Raraju"	Krishna Chaitanya	Ranjith, Suchitra	5:03
6.	"Nuvve Kanta Padavante"	Krishna Chaitanya	S. P. Balasubrahmanyam	3:47
Total length:				26:30

== Reception ==
Rediff has given an average rating of 2.5 out of 5 and described it as "Filled with masala, Anjaneyulu which is fairly slickly made is likely to go down well with the masses. Ravi Teja steals the show in Anjaneyulu". Idlebrain gave 3/5 rating for this film.
