= Temper (film) =

2015 Indian film by Puri Jagannadh

- Theatrical release poster
- Directed by: Puri Jagannadh
- Written by: Screenplay & Dialogues: Puri Jagannadh
- Story by: Vakkantham Vamsi
- Produced by: Bandla Ganesh
- Starring: N. T. Rama Rao Jr. Kajal Aggarwal; Prakash Raj; Posani Krishna Murali
- Cinematography: Shyam K. Naidu
- Edited by: M. S. Rajashekhar Reddy (S. R. Shekhar)
- Music by: Songs: Anup Rubens; Score: Mani Sharma
- Production company: Parameswara Art Productions
- Release date: 13 February 2015
- Running time: 144 minutes
- Country: India
- Language: Telugu
- Budget: ₹35 crore
- Box office: est. ₹74.3 crore

Temper is a 2015 Indian Telugu-language action drama film co-written and directed by Puri Jagannadh and story by Vakkantham Vamsi, starring N. T. Rama Rao Jr., Kajal Aggarwal, Prakash Raj, and Posani Krishna Murali. The film was produced by Bandla Ganesh under the Parameswara Art Productions banner. Anup Rubens composed the soundtrack, while Mani Sharma composed the score. Shyam K. Naidu and S. R. Sekhar handled the film's cinematography and editing, respectively.

The film follows a corrupt sub-inspector, Daya, who undergoes a moral transformation after a series of events involving a local don and a brutal rape case. Initially driven by greed, Daya's redemption begins when he encounters Lakshmi, a woman seeking justice for her murdered sister. Haunted by his past negligence, Daya resolves to bring the culprits to justice, even at the cost of his own life.

The film was made on a budget of ₹35 crore. Production began on 1 August 2014 at Hyderabad and principal photography commenced the next day. After being halted twice because of the Film Federation employees' strike, the film's shoot was completed by 31 January 2015, with the film being primarily shot in and around Hyderabad and Goa.

The film was released worldwide on 13 February 2015 to positive reviews from critics and audiences, who praised Puri Jagannadh's direction, the characterisation of Daya, and NTR's, Posani Krishna Murali's, and Prakash Raj's performances, with the former's considered as one of his best. The film was a successful and marked a major comeback for N. T. Rama Rao Jr. after two consecutive box office failures. It grossed ₹74.3 crore, with a lifetime share of ₹43.1 crore. The film was later remade in Hindi as Simmba (2018) and in Tamil as Ayogya (2019). The film holds the record for the highest TRP (Television Rating Point) for a Telugu film premiere, clocking a staggering 29.9 rating.

== Plot ==
Daya, an orphan, developed a preconceived childhood idea that a cop's life would be buoyant and easy, having seen the police often taking bribes, and harbors an aspiration to become one. He becomes a corrupt Sub-Inspector and gets transferred to Vishakapatnam, where he quickly gets in cahoots with local don Waltair Vasu and starts earning quick bucks. He earns hatred from Narayana Murthy, an honest constable under him, when Daya releases Vasu's four younger brothers Ravi, Mani, Vamsi, and Sundeep from prison, where they were apprehended for smuggling on Gandhi Jayanti. Elsewhere, he begins to woo Saanvi, a Blue Cross member who reciprocates his feelings.

Vasu's henchmen abduct Saanvi on her birthday, mistaking her for the girl they were actually supposed to kidnap and later kill. Daya fights them off to rescue her. Vasu clears the confusion with his arrival and lets go of Daya and Saanvi after apologizing to them. As her birthday gift, Saanvi pleads with Daya to save the actual target. Daya obliges, saving the girl, Lakshmi, much to Vasu's chagrin. Daya later reconciles with Vasu, who agrees to relinquish his plans of murdering Lakshmi if Daya manages to retrieve a piece of evidence she holds against a crime committed by his brothers.

Daya talks with Lakshmi to learn that her younger sister Deepthi was brutally raped and killed after being subjected to torture for 40 days by Vasu's brothers (who kidnapped Deepthi on the same day Daya had released them unlawfully), who filmed everything and stored the footage in a CD, which Lakshmi managed to discover. Lakshmi entrusts Daya with the disc, asking him to bring the culprits to justice. Daya (under the pretext of Lakshmi and her mother's safety) arranges for her and her mother to leave for USA, where Lakshmi had a job before Deepthi 's murder.

Daya learns that Lakshmi's mother was the one who approached him to file a missing person complaint about Deepthi days after the kidnapping, but he convinced her that she had eloped, in his ignorance and carelessness, rather than investigating, before being privy to the crime. Deepthi's mother hopes for her "eloped" daughter to return, and is still unaware of the atrocities that Deepthi was subjected to, as Lakshmi chose to hide it for the sake of her mother's stability. Daya drops Lakshmi and her mother at the airport, where the former's conversation with him brings a change in Daya, who holds himself responsible for Deepthi's murder, as the crime had only occurred due to his corrupt actions.

Vasu's henchmen arrive at the station to retrieve the disc from Daya, who is told by Murthy of the humanity and compassion still in him. Daya fights off the henchmen and decides to get the brothers punished. Daya recognizes Saanvi as the reason for his reformation and reveals his previous actions to her, but she forgives him as he has changed.

Meanwhile, Deepthi's corpse is discovered, discarded on a beach. The brutality of the crime stuns the nation, and even the doctors who performed the autopsy on her. In court, Daya's lawyer produces the disc as evidence against the brothers, but it had been tampered with, making the sole proof of the brothers' criminality in the murder invalid. Daya deduces that his lawyer worked with Vasu to obstruct the case and regrets not making copies of it. Lakshmi's mother, who is in the US, suffers from a heart attack after learning of Deepthi's death.

Daya decides that he will bring the brothers to justice by any means possible. The next day in court, he states that he has also assaulted Deepthi along with the four brothers and was an accomplice to the crime, to make sure that the brothers do not escape the death sentence, even at the cost of his life. The statement shocks everyone, including Saanvi and Murthy, with both of them refusing to believe his declaration. The judge gives a death sentence to Daya and the brothers.

Lakshmi, learning of Daya's stance, contacts Murthy to reveal that she had an extra copy of the murder footage with her all along for caution, and shares it with the media, proving Daya's innocence. As a result, Daya's death penalty is cancelled, while the brothers initiate a brawl with the police minutes before their hanging. In the fight, Daya kills three of them, while the fourth commits suicide at the spot where he was supposed to be hanged to death, fearing Daya's wrath. Daya is released from prison and reinstated into the police service, and reconciles with Saanvi and Murthy.

== Cast ==
- N. T. Rama Rao Jr. as SI Daya
- Kajal Aggarwal as Saanvi
- Prakash Raj as Waltair Vasu
- Posani Krishna Murali as Head Constable Narayana Murthy
- Nyra Banerjee as Lakshmi
- Apoorva Srinivasan as Deepthi
- Subbaraju as Ravi
- Amit Tiwari as Mani
- Kota Srinivasa Rao as Judge
- Ali as a Chain snatcher
- Rao Ramesh as Mavayya, Daya's uncle
- Sapthagiri as a Chain snatcher #2
- Tanikella Bharani as Venkat Rao
- Sonia Agarwal as Doctor
- Pavitra Lokesh as Lakshmi's mother
- Kovai Sarala as Shanvi's mother
- Rama Prabha as Shanvi's grandmother
- Jaya Prakash Reddy as Home Minister
- Vennela Kishore as Vennela Kishore
- Narsing Yadav as Police Officer
- Mukhtar Khan as Police Officer
- Raghu Babu as Jaani Bhai
- Junaid Sheikh as Shiva
- Raghu Karumanchi as Madhav
- Vamsi as Vamsi
- Nora Fatehi in a special appearance in the song "Ittage Rechchipodam"

== Production ==
=== Development ===
B. V. S. N. Prasad was expected to produce this film under the Sri Venkateswara Cine Chitra banner. He went to Bangkok at the end of March 2014 to write the story of this project.

Jagannadh chose to direct the script written by Vamsi in mid-May 2014 which marked the former's first film whose story was not written by him. The script work was in progress by late May 2014 and the film was declared a cop drama.

In late June 2014, Devi Sri Prasad was rumoured to be selected as the music director of the film but however ,Anup Rubens was finalised while the cast and crew were being finalised. Shyam K. Naidu was named as cinematographer, S. R. Sekhar was named as editor, Brahma Kadali was named as art director while FEFSI Vijayan was recruited to compose the fights.

The titles Temper, and Nenorakam with the tagline "Totally Corrupted" were initially considered by the makers. The film was rumoured to be facing financial troubles in December 2014.

=== Casting ===
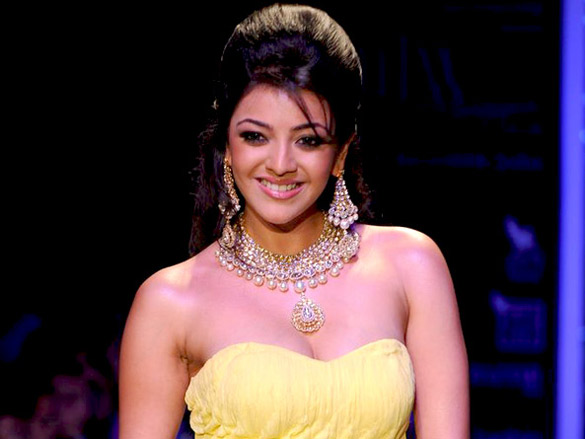
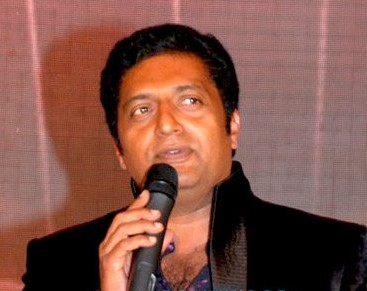
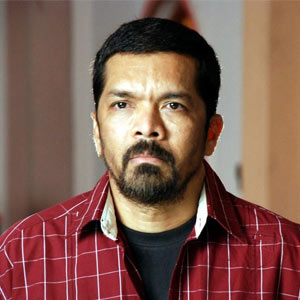
(left to right) Principal cast of the film apart from N. T. Rama Rao Jr. : Kajal Aggarwal, Prakash Raj and Posani Krishna Murali.

Kajal Aggarwal was selected as the heroine of this film in early June 2013, pairing with Rama Rao after two successful films Brindavanam (2010) and Baadshah (2013), whose inclusion was confirmed by Jagannadh in a statement to the media after few days. Ajaz Khan was signed as the antagonist of the film in July 2014. On the day of launch, it was confirmed that Prakash Raj, Madhuurima, Ali, Kota Srinivasa Rao, and Posani Krishna Murali would play important roles along with Tanikella Bharani, Subbaraju, Vennela Kishore, Jaya Prakash Reddy, Sapthagiri, Ramaprabha, Pavitra Lokesh, and Kovai Sarala.

Aggarwal had shortage of bulk dates to accommodate, and it was rumored that Tamannaah or a new actress would replace her. Ganesh denied the rumors and confirmed Aggarwal's inclusion. Though initially planned to shoot simultaneously for a film by Sudhir Mishra, Aggarwal opted to continue with this film due to certain problems with Mishra's script. S. Sreesanth and Zarine Khan were speculated to be a part of the film's cast when they visited Jagannath's Cave, but there was no official confirmation then. Naveena was reported to be considered for a small role. Jagannadh immediately selected Nora Fatehi for an item number after her intense training to prepare for her role as a commando in the film Roar: Tigers of the Sundarbans (2014).

R. Narayana Murthy was approached for a special character in the film opposite Rama Rao. Murthy liked the role but declined it as he did not want to move to mainstream cinema and was content making left-oriented films. Sonia Agarwal was signed on to play a significant role in the film. Apoorva Srinivasan was cast for a small yet crucial supporting role marking her debut in Telugu cinema. Junaid Sheikh was selected to play a negative role.

=== Characters and looks ===
Rama Rao was reported to be seen as a tough and eccentric police officer in this film. Regarding her character in the film, Madhuurima said that she plays a crucial role which is the turning point in the film. She later added that her role is a small one that changes the course of the protagonist's character graph. Aggarwal was confirmed to play the role of an animal lover in this film. For his role, Rama Rao hired a new trainer who specializes in improving muscle tone and a shed few kilograms, relying on a high-protein diet and workout routine to build a hefty body. He also sported a crew cut.

However, the makers tried to find out who leaked it online as they wanted the pictures to be released to create a buzz before the film's launch.

Rama Rao underwent a drastic physical transformation from head to toe in hairdo, costumes, body and attitude for this role. His stylist Ashwin Mawle shopped for the costumes and accessories from designer stores in Hong Kong and London. Regarding the styling, Ashwin further revealed, "For the hair, we tried getting a few variations of spikes — straight, cross and messy. He (Rama Rao) keeps a tab on the latest trends. He took a lot of references from latest runway looks and zeroed in on an earthy color palette: brown, burgundy and grey. Thick jackets make him look bulkier, so he has gone for slim fit shirts and jackets made of linen" in an interview with Sasidhar AS of The Times of India. He added that Rama Rao trimmed his mustache for sporting a rugged look.

Madhuurima said in an interview to Suresh Kavirayani of Deccan Chronicle that she participated in few action sequences with Rama Rao in the film and added that she has no songs with him. For a particular scene where he had to walk with bare chest, Rama Rao skipped drinking a glass of water for 18 hours continuously.

=== Filming ===
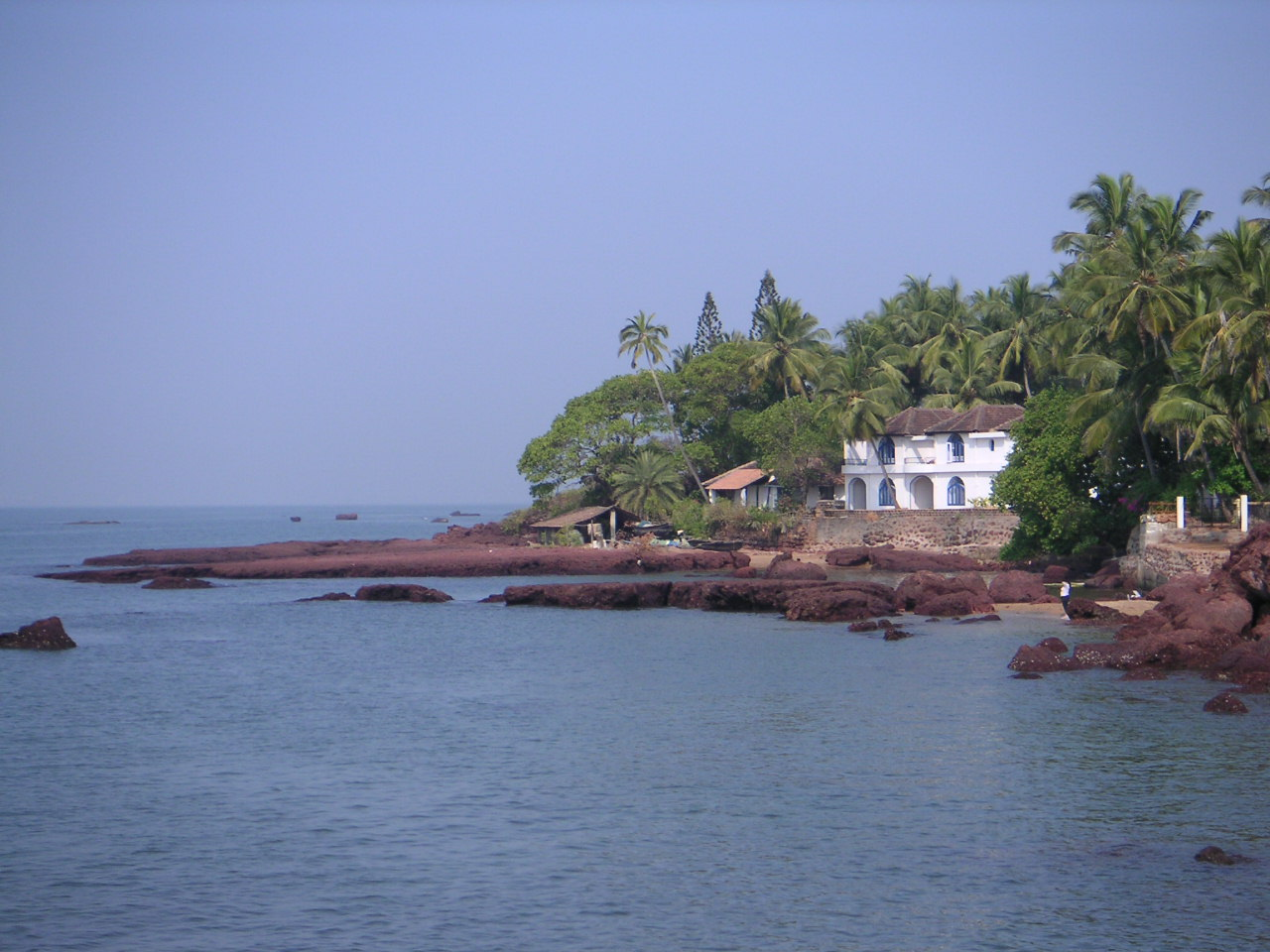
Goa, where the initial scenes were shot

The regular shooting was planned to commence in April 2014. In mid-May 2014, the film's shooting schedules were planned in July 2014. On 1 July 2014 it was declared that the film's shoot would be completed in 100 working days. Principal photography began on 2 August 2014. Madhuurima joined the film's sets on 9 August. Rama Rao was expected to join the film's sets on 11 August, though he joined on 21 August in the Aluminium Factory at Gachibowli in Hyderabad. Few comedy scenes were shot on Rama Rao, Vennela Kishore and other supporting cast after a week. The film's second schedule was planned from 10 September till the completion of the film's shoot, which was postponed to 15 September because of disruption in construction of a large police station set due to rainfall.

The makers selected a house in Begumpet to erect a special police station set to shoot a few crucial scenes, on which ₹2.7 million was invested. An item number on Rama Rao and Nora Fatehi was shot in Hyderabad in early October 2014. That song was a fast-paced folk song choreographed by Shekhar, which Nora termed a "hyper energetic dance number".

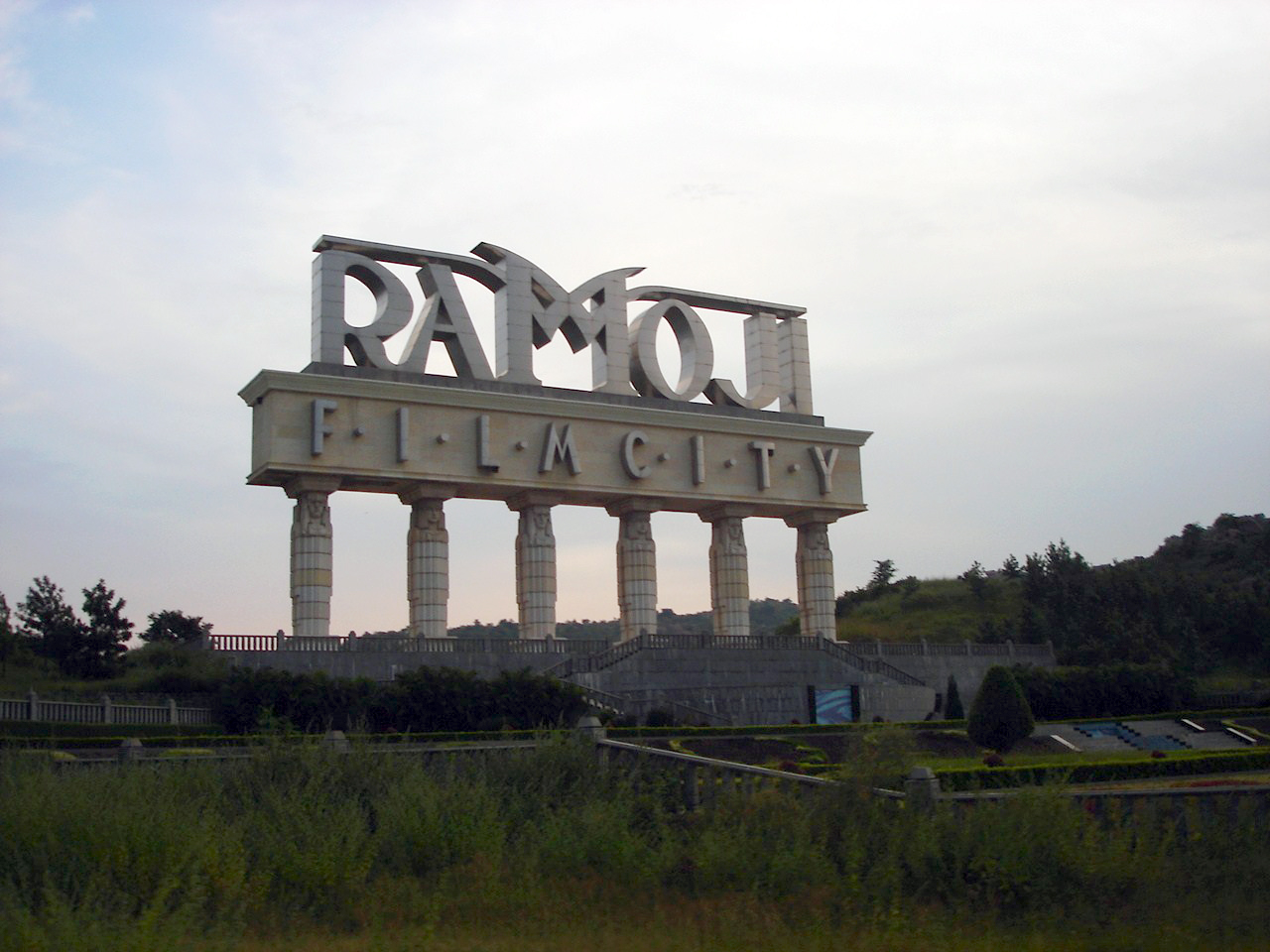
Ramoji Film City, where parts of the film were shot

The makers chose Goa to shoot major parts of the film. The film's Goa schedule was delayed due to the ongoing strike for non-acceptance of the revised pay hike for the Film Federation Employees. The strike was called off later, and the filming continued from 25 October at Goa, where major parts of the film were shot. The Goa schedule came to an end on 24 November, and the team returned to Hyderabad the next day. By then, 80% of the film's shoot was complete.

The film's shoot was disrupted again due to another strike caused by Film Federation Employees to appoint technicians who have a membership in the Federation. The makers said that two weeks of filming is pending, which would start immediately once the strike is called off. However, the film's shoot was reported to be progressing in Hyderabad with employees other than the ones from Federation being employed. The strike was called off on 5 December 2014, and the union members took part in the shootings from the next day. Ganesh called off the film's shoot for 10 days as Rama Rao was devastated because of the death of his stepbrother Nandamuri Janakiram.

"The film had a scene where N. T. Rama Rao Jr. playing the role of the cop gets into a confrontation with Prakash Raj and Kota Srinivasa Rao. When Puri Jagannadh narrated the scene, Rama Rao Jr. suggested it would be better to have it set in a courtroom."

— A source from the film's unit in an interaction with The Times of India.

16 days of the shoot were reported to be pending, and the filming was expected to come to an end on 31 December 2014. Meanwhile, Rama Rao participated in the shoot of some important jail and court scenes at a specially erected set in Aluminium Factory near Gachibowli. Puri Jagannadh informed Ganesh that the film cannot be completed as planned and that film will not be ready for a Sankranti release. The latter was fine with the decision and gave a break to Rama Rao. The last song was shot on Rama Rao and Aggarwal in late January 2015.

=== Post-production ===
S. R. Sekhar simultaneously completed the editing work so that the film could release on time. Post-production activities progressed in tandem with the filming during the film's shoot at Goa. Rama Rao and the film's cast began dubbing for their roles on 4 February 2015. The pending DTS mixing and Rama Rao's dubbing were completed by 7 February 2015.

== Themes and influences ==
In an interview with Subhash K. Jha for the newspaper Absolute India, Jagannadh said that the film is basically the story of a bad police officer played by Rama Rao and is an action-oriented film. He added later that the film is about a highly corrupt and cunning police officer who later transforms into an honest one and the title of the film signifies that the protagonist's character has attitude, arrogance, and is defiant. He added that the film has a novel theme and is not inspired by anyone in real life. A source from the film's unit revealed that the confrontation scene in the courtroom was shot on the lines of a similar scene from the film Bobbili Puli (1982) and features Rama Rao delivering dialogues that ridicule the contemporary judicial system and police hierarchy.

== Music ==
Anup Rubens was signed on to compose the film's soundtrack album after Rama Rao insisted on Jagannadh bringing a relatively new music composer on board when the latter opted for Devi Sri Prasad. Rahul Kumar, mostly known as Roll Rida, rapped for the songs. The soundtrack was marketed by Aditya Music and was released on 16 September 2014 to positive reviews from critics.

== Release ==
The film was initially planned for a worldwide theatrical release on 9 January 2015 as a Sankranthi release. The release date was speculated as 13 February 2015, and an official confirmation was awaited. Rama Rao was expected to announce the film's release date at the audio launch event.

Great India Films was expected to release the film in 125 screens across the overseas markets.

=== Distribution ===
DBB Films announced later that they acquired the distribution and theatrical screening rights of the film in Europe except United Kingdom, whose theatrical screening rights were acquired by Colours Media later. Sumanth Sunkara acquired the distribution rights of the film in Canada.

=== Marketing ===
The makers planned to reveal the film's first look teaser on Diwali. Puri Jagannadh unveiled two posters featuring Rama Rao on the same day.

A new still of Rama Rao was unveiled on 29 December 2014. The first look teaser was unveiled on 1 January 2015. Another poster featuring Rama Rao and Aggarwal was unveiled on the same day. A set of five stills featuring the lead pair and another five stills featuring Rama Rao were released on the next day.

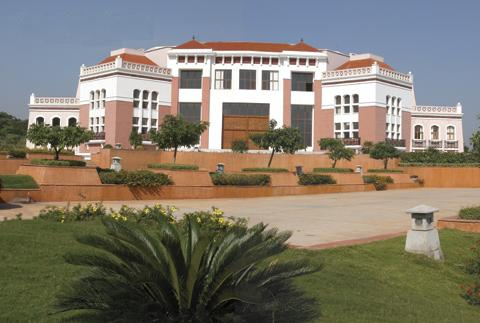
Shilpakala Vedika, where the film's theatrical trailer was unveiled along with the soundtrack album and their video promos on 28 January 2015

Deccan Chronicle opined that the trailer promised action and entertainment and would leave the audience asking for more. Meanwhile, the video promo of the item number Ittage Rechchipodam crossed more than 90,000 views on the official channel in YouTube within 24 hours of its release. The dance moves of Rama Rao and Nora Fatehi received praise.

The 40-second video promo of the song Temper received praise, particularly for Rama Rao's dance movements. The theatrical trailer crossed half a million views within 18 hours of its release in YouTube. It crossed one million views on 1 February 2015 in Puri Jagannadh's official channel on YouTube, making it one of the record-breaking Telugu film trailers in YouTube. The video promo of the song One More Time received positive response. Six new stills featuring Rama Rao along with a set of working stills were released on 4 February 2015.

=== Home media ===
Then film recorded a TRP (Television Rating Point) of 29.9 on Gemini TV, which remains the highest TRP ever recorded for a Telugu film premiere to this day.

=== Novelisation ===
Two years after the film's release, the film's writer Vamsi adapted the film as a novel in English which was released in April 2017.

== Reception ==
=== Critical reception ===
Y. Sunita Chowdary of The Hindu praised Rama Rao's performance as one of his finest works and added, "The strength of the story lies in Puri Jagan's clarity, at no moment he is in a hurry or tempted to show the hero's softer side. What this film needed desperately was personality and character and this time it gets both". IBN Live called it the best work of Rama Rao after Rakhi (2006) and added, "Although the film isn't targeted mainly at family audience due to overtly dealt perverted ideas, Temper can be a best watch for Nandamuri Fans". Hemanth Kumar of The Times of India gave the film 3.5 out of 5 stars and praised Rama Rao's performance and the film's underlying theme. He wrote, "In the end, Temper comes across as a film which was meant for NTR to reinvent himself, for Puri to prove that he hasn't lost his mojo yet, for NTR's fans, whose unflinching faith in the actor hasn't diminished at all". Suresh Kavirayani of Deccan Chronicle gave the film 3 out of 5 stars. He praised the performances of Rama Rao and Prakash Raj and termed the film as one of the best films of the former's and also his ideal comeback.

In contrast, Haricharan Pudipeddi of IANS gave the film 3 out of 5 stars and termed Temper a regular Puri Jagannadh film salvaged by Rama Rao's performance which he called a "terrific" one.

=== Accolades ===
Ceremony	Category	Nominee	Result	Reference(s)
IIFA Utsavam	Best Direction	Puri Jagannadh	Nominated	
IIFA Utsavam	Performance in a Leading Role – Male	N. T. Rama Rao Jr.	Nominated	
IIFA Utsavam	Best Performance in a Supporting Role–Male	Posani Krishna Murali	Nominated	
IIFA Utsavam	Best Music Direction	Anoop Rubens	Nominated	
CineMAA Awards	Best Dialogue Writer	Puri Jagannadh	Won	
CineMAA Awards	Best Actor – Male	N. T. Rama Rao Jr.	Won	
CineMAA Awards	Best Actor in a Supporting Role	Posani Krishna Murali	Won	
Nandi Awards	Best Supporting Actor	Posani Krishna Murali	Won	

== Remakes ==
Sachiin J. Joshi announced that he would bankroll the Tamil and Hindi remakes of the film under his banner Viiking Media & Entertainment Pvt Ltd. Dharma Productions later acquired the remake rights for Hindi, but the version titled Simmba (2018) was, according to its director Rohit Shetty, only a partial remake of Temper. The film was also remade in Tamil as Ayogya (2019).
