= Parameswara Art Productions =

Indian film production company

Parameswara art Productions
- Industry: Entertainment
- Founded: 2009
- Headquarters: Hyderabad, Telangana, India
- Key people: Bandla Ganesh
- Products: Films
- Owner: Bandla Ganesh
- Website: Bandla Ganesh

Parameswara Art Productions is an Indian film production company established by Bandla Ganesh in 2009. It is one of the biggest film production houses in South India and is one of the major production houses in the Telugu film industry.

== History ==
Anjaneyulu was the first movie made under this banner. It starred Ravi Teja and Nayantara and was directed by Parasuram. It was released on 12 August 2009. Its pre-release revenue fetched an additional ₹15 crore (US$1.6 million). Parameswara Arts' next flick Gabbar Singh turned to be an all-time industry hit by collecting ₹170 crore (US$18 million) in 100 Days worldwide including all its versions. Its pre-release revenues fetched an additional ₹40 crore (US$4.2 million). Later he made NTR starrer Baadshah termed as the highest budget movie in Telugu cinema with a budget of ₹55 crore (US$5.7 million) The film turned out to be Super hit By collecting a producers share of ₹60 crore (US$6.3 million) in 100 Days. and a gross of ₹115 crore (US$12 million) in 100 Days.Baadshah's pre-release revenue fetched an additional ₹50 crore (US$5.2 million). Later he made Allu Arjun starrer Iddaramyilatho. The film received mixed reviews but was a commercial hit collecting over ₹80 crore (US$8.3 million) Gross.Bandla Ganesh already produced Ram Charan’s new flick which was released in 2014.

== Film production ==
No	Year	Film	Director	Actors	Notes
1	2009	Anjaneyulu	Parasuram	Ravi Teja, Nayantara	
2	2011	Teen Maar	Jayanth C. Paranjee	Pawan Kalyan, Trisha Krishnan, Kriti Kharbanda	
3	2012	Gabbar Singh	Harish Shankar	Pawan Kalyan, Shruti Haasan	Nominated—SIIMA Award for Best Film
4	2013	Baadshah	Srinu Vaitla	Jr. NTR, Kajal Aggarwal	
5	2013	Iddarammayilatho	Puri Jagannadh	Allu Arjun, Amala Paul, Catherine Tresa	
6	2014	Nee Jathaga Nenundali	Jaya Ravindra	Sachiin J Joshi, Nazia Hussain	
7	2014	Govindudu Andarivadele	Krishna Vamsi	Ram Charan, Srikanth, Kajal Aggarwal, Kamalinee Mukherjee	
8	2015	Temper	Puri Jagannadh	Jr. NTR, Kajal Aggarwal	

== Awards ==
S.no	Ceremony	Year	Category	Nominee	Result
1	CineMAA Awards	2013	Best Film	Gabbar Singh	Won
2	TSR – TV9 National Film Awards	2015	Best Entertainment Film	Baadshah	Won
