= Iddarammayilatho =

2013 Indian film by Puri Jagannadh

- Theatrical release poster
- Directed by: Puri Jagannadh
- Written by: Puri Jagannadh
- Produced by: Bandla Ganesh
- Starring: Allu Arjun; Amala Paul; Catherine Tresa; Shawar Ali
- Cinematography: Amol Rathod
- Edited by: M. S. Rajashekhar Reddy (S. R. Shekhar)
- Music by: Devi Sri Prasad
- Production company: Parameswara Art Productions
- Distributed by: Blue Sky
- Release date: 31 May 2013
- Running time: 143 minutes
- Country: India
- Language: Telugu
- Budget: ₹ 33 crore

Iddarammayilatho (transl. 'With two girls') is a 2013 Indian Telugu-language romantic action comedy film written and directed by Puri Jagannadh. It stars Allu Arjun, Amala Paul, Catherine Tresa and Shawar Ali, while Brahmanandam, Ali, Nassar, Pragathi, Tanikella Bharani, Tulasi, Subbaraju, and Rao Ramesh play supporting roles. The film was entirely shot in Spain and Paris. Bandla Ganesh has produced the film under Parameswara Art Productions. The film was simultaneously dubbed and released in Malayalam as Romeo & Juliets. Iddarammayilatho was released in 1,600 theaters worldwide on 31 May 2013.

== Plot ==
The Central Minister is facing accusations over possessing black money of ₹1 trillion (equivalent to ₹1.9 trillion or US$19 billion in 2026) and money laundering it into Europe through his unsuspecting daughter Akanksha, a psychology student who goes to Barcelona to pursue higher education. Akanksha finds a diary in her flat in Barcelona. Out of curiosity, she starts reading it, which unfolds the love story between Sanju Reddy and Komali Sankaraabharanam. Akanksha gets engaged in Paris with her father's henchman Shawar Ali. Incidentally, she runs into Sanju and gets to know his past.

Past: Sanju is an engineer-turned-lead guitarist of a band and makes his living through the stage and street performances. As narrated in the diary, Komali comes from an orthodox Telugu Brahmin family. She is interested in classical music and ends up learning the violin at a music school in Barcelona under fiddle professor Brahma. In a twist of fate, she falls in love with Sanju and gets approval for their inter-caste marriage from their parents in India. Komali unknowingly gets caught after video footage that she accidentally shot while Shawar kills the Spanish ambassador, in the process of money laundering. Sanju saves Komali from these henchmen on a couple of occasions; this is where the diary story ends abruptly. Out of curiosity, Akanksha starts questioning Sanju about their love story, and, in the process, learns disturbing facts. On continuous asking by Akanksha, Sanju tells her that Komali is dead. It is then shown in a flashback that to fix Sanju and Komali's marriage, their parents had come to Spain. It was at that time that Shawar's brother kidnapped Komali, and when Sanju came to save her, Komali was murdered by the brother. In a fit of rage, Sanju stabs the whole gang to death, and Shawar's brother goes into a coma.

Present: On hearing this, Akanksha feels sorry for Sanju and falls in love with him. She also tries to bring him out of the memory of Komali, but in vain. Meanwhile, Akanksha spots Komali crossing a street. Akanksha runs to Sanju to tell him about Komali, but at that time, Sanju gets surrounded by Shawar's men. Sanju, while trashing up Shawar's men, tells Akanksha that he trapped her. He reveals what really happened

Past: After beating up Shawar's brother, Sanju had taken Komali's body to the hospital, from where Sanju's father calls up the Central Minister to arrest Shawar in Spain after watching the video footage. The Central Minister then calls up Shawar to finish off this trouble in order to save himself. Shawar then goes to the hospital, kills Sanju's and Komali's parents, and attacks Sanju and Komali, who are presumed dead. However, Sanju and Komali did not die.

Present: It is revealed that Sanju had been waiting all this time to get his revenge; he made Akanksha the pawn in this game; and it was he who faxed their photo in order to make Shawar jealous so that Shawar himself will come to kill Sanju. Sanju and Shawar engage in a battle in the forest, where Sanju kills Shawar and his brother with Akanksha's help. The Central Minister gets arrested, and Sanju and Komali live happily, while Akanksha vows to win back Sanju.

== Cast ==
- Allu Arjun as Sanju Reddy Alias “Sanju”
- Amala Paul as Komali Sankarabharanam
- Catherine Tresa as Akanksha
- Shawar Ali as Shawar Ali
- Brahmanandam as Fiddle Brahma
- Ali as Gudivada Krishna
- Nassar as Sanju's father
- Pragathi as Sumathi, Sanju's mother
- Tanikella Bharani as Shankarabharanam, Komali's father
- Tulasi as Komali's mother
- Subbaraju as Shawar's brother
- Rao Ramesh as Akanksha's father and the Central Minister
- Mamilla Shailaja Priya as Akanksha's mother
- Srinivasa Reddy as Sanju's musical gang member
- Khayyum as Sanju's musical gang member
- Damien Mavis as the Spanish ambassador
- Steven Dasz as Henchman
- Kaajal Vashisht
- Devshi Khanduri in item number

== Production ==
In September, Amala Paul was selected to play one of the female leads. First the makers chose Tapsee Pannu for another role, which was later received by Richa Gangopadhyay. But Richa was officially replaced by Catherine Tresa.The film was officially launched on 18 October 2012 at Ramanaidu Studios in Hyderabad.Filming took place in Spain in February 2013. First Look of the movie was launched on 10 March 2013.A theatrical trailer was released on the occasion of Allu Arjun's birthday on 8 April 2013.

== Soundtrack ==
Iddarammayilatho

Soundtrack album by Devi Sri Prasad
- Released: 29 April 2013
- Recorded: 2012–2013
- Genre: Feature film soundtrack
- Length: 25:43
- Language: Telugu
- Label: Aditya Music
- Producer: Devi Sri Prasad

Devi Sri Prasad chronology
| Mirchi (2013) | Iddarammayilatho (2013) | Singam II (2013) |

Devi Sri Prasad composed the music, collaborating for the sixth time with Allu Arjun and for the first time with Puri Jagannadh. British pop and reggae singer Apache Indian is featured on the track "Run Run", and Suraj Jagan contributes vocals on "Ganapati Bappa".

Track-List
| No. | Title | Lyrics | Artist(s) | Length |
|---|---|---|---|---|
| 1. | "Run Run" | Ramajogayya Sastry | Apache Indian, Sharmila, Benny Dayal | 5:03 |
| 2. | "Shankarabharanamto" | Devi Sri Prasad | Mano, Suchith Suresan, Ranina Reddy | 4:25 |
| 3. | "Violin Song (girl just)" | Viswa, David Simon | David, Anitha | 4:24 |
| 4. | "Ganapati Bappa" | Bhaskarabhatla Ravi Kumar | Suraj Jagan | 3:29 |
| 5. | "Top Lechipoddi" | Bhaskarabhatla Ravi Kumar | Sagar, Geetha Madhuri | 4:18 |
| 6. | "Run Run (Remix)" | Ramajogayya Sastry | Apache Indian, Devi Sri Prasad, Sharmila | 4:00 |
| Total length: | | | | 25:43 |

=== Reception ===
The audio got a positive response. APHerald.com gave a review stating "Refreshing tracks from Devi Sri Prasad and this time stylish star Allu Arjun got stylish songs too from DSP." Cineoutlook.com gave a review stating "Very good musical scores. Going to rock in the coming days…"

== Release ==
The film's overseas rights are owned by Blue Sky for approximately ₹30 million (equivalent to ₹56 million or US$580,000 in 2026) It released worldwide on 31 May 2013 with a U/A Certificate from the Censor Board. The movie released in a record no. of 175+ screens in overseas by Bluesky with Digital Quality on 30 May 2013.

== Reception ==
Jeevi of idlebrain.com gave a rating of 3 on a scale of 5 and opined that the first half is entertaining. "It's a stylish film though emotions didn't work." Mahesh S Koneru of 123telugu.com gave a review stating "'Iddarammayilatho' is a very stylish offering from Puri Jagan. Allu Arjun's performance, Catherine's glamour and the action sequences are assets for the film. The slow pace in the second half and the absence of traditional Puri Jagan elements like heroism and punch dialogues might hamper the overall experience." Girija Narayan of Oneindia Entertainment gave a review stating "Iddarammayilatho is definitely a good movie to watch. The movie gets a lot more interesting in the second half. The climax definitely lets the viewers go home happy." Sasidhar AS of The Times of India gave a review stating, "Iddarammayilatho hits you like fresh air, and you instantly fall for the lead characters, refreshingly flesh-and-blood with their set of quirks, flaws and strengths. The first half does ramble a bit and takes time to build up into a riveting second half." APHerald.com gave a review stating "Iddarammayilatho is one time watcher and entire credit goes to Puri Jagannadh." SuperGoodMovies gave a review stating "'Iddarammayilatho' is a beautiful and stylish movie of Allu Arjun and Puri Jagannath. Definitely, it is a worthy watch."

== Box office ==
=== India ===
The film had a good start in A, B and C Centres in its first weekend. The film collected ₹195 million (equivalent to ₹360 million or US$3.8 million in 2026) on its opening day at worldwide circuits which is a record for Allu Arjun. It showed improvement irrespective of mixed reviews, ending up with a collection of ₹270 million (equivalent to ₹500 million or US$5.2 million in 2026) in 3 Days at the Indian box office. The movie collected a total of ₹450 million (equivalent to ₹830 million or US$8.7 million in 2026) at the box office at the end of its opening week. The film continued to gross steady revenues at all areas, receiving much better response at A Centres, when compared to B and C Centres. The film completed 50 Days in 19 Direct Centers on 19 July 2013. In Nizam Area Iddaramyilatho collected a Share of ₹125 million (equivalent to ₹230 million or US$2.4 million in 2026) in 70 Days.

=== Overseas ===
The movie collected a total of 9174,000 in just 3 days of release. At its opening weekend, the movie collected a total of 17.1 million at the USA Box office. Iddaramyilatho was a good grosser at overseas. It collected $1 million in its full run. Iddaramyilatho earned ₹13 million (US$130,000) through premier shows in the U.S. even before its release. Despite mixed reviews the movie collected $7.7 million worldwide and the movie was declared as an average grosser at the box office
