= Sakthi (2011 film) =

2011 Indian film by Meher Ramesh

- Theatrical poster
- Directed by: Meher Ramesh
- Written by: Meher Ramesh; Yandamoori Veerendranath; J. K. Bharavi
- Produced by: C. Ashwini Dutt
- Starring: N. T. Rama Rao Jr. Ileana D'Cruz
- Cinematography: Sameer Reddy
- Edited by: Marthand K. Venkatesh
- Music by: Mani Sharma
- Production company: Vyjayanthi Movies
- Distributed by: Sri Venkateswara Creations
- Release date: 1 April 2011
- Running time: 158 minutes
- Country: India
- Language: Telugu

Sakthi (transl. Power) is a 2011 Indian Telugu-language fantasy action film directed by Meher Ramesh. The film stars N. T. Rama Rao Jr. alongside Ileana D'Cruz, Prabhu, Manjari Phadnis, S. P. Balasubramanyam, Vidyut Jammwal, Pooja Bedi, Jackie Shroff, Sonu Sood and Nassar. The film was produced by C. Aswani Dutt under Vyjayanthi Movies. Mani Sharma composed the soundtrack.

The film follows Sakthi (N. T. Rama Rao Jr.), a tourist guide who falls for Aishwarya (Ileana D'Cruz), as they evade Faqtooni's relentless pursuit of a powerful gem unknowingly carried by Aishwarya.

Sakthi was released on 1 April 2011 and opened on more than 7000 screens worldwide. It was heavily panned by critics and audiences alike, who criticised the film's screenplay for its illogical plot points and overall execution, ultimately becoming a box office disaster.

== Plot ==
Faqtooni, the wife of Egyptian King Mukhtar, sends her youngest son Bashim to India to retrieve a magical gem and weapon to avenge her husband's death. Aishwarya, the daughter of government minister Mahadevaraya—who, as a descendant of a royal family, is also the custodian of the gem—sneaks away from her home to travel to Jaipur with her friends. Unbeknownst to Aishwarya, she packs the magical gem in her bag. Aishwarya and her friends meet Sakthi, who acts as their tour guide after they are assaulted by a group of men. While Aishwarya is in Jaipur, Mahadevaraya offers his old friend, Jackie the Great, his entire wealth for the magical weapon, which he came to possess by killing his father. Jackie declines Mahadevaraya's offer.

Later, in Kashmir, Aishwarya is kidnapped by Bashim's henchmen. Sakthi rescues her, but Bashim follows them to Hardiwar, where Sakthi discovers the magical gem while swimming in the Ganges. While leaving the city, Aishwarya proposes to Sakthi, but he declines. Sakthi then captures Bashim following a shootout with him and his henchmen. Faqtooni attempts to purchase the magical weapon from Jackie, who demands a large sum. Sakthi reveals that he has been serving undercover to protect Aishwarya, as she was the target of a terrorist group. Faqtooni sends her older son, Raakha, to India to rescue Bashim.

Aishwarya finds pictures of herself in Sakthi's bag, leading Sakthi to confess his love at first sight. Sakthi and Aishwarya, along with his adoptive parents, go to a temple for his birthday. Sakthi finds the box with the gem and opens it. Siva, Sakthi's adoptive father, informs Mahadevaraya, who orders him to bring the gem and Aishwarya to Hapmi. Raakha frees Bashim, and together they attack Siva and the officers escorting Aishwarya. Raakha is wounded by Sakthi, who gains powers after touching the gem. At Hampi, Bashim tries to snatch the gem, but is killed by Sakthi with an ancient sword.

A sage explains that Rudra—Sakthi's biological father—was the protector of a secret Shakta pitha and that he sacrificed his life to protect his pregnant wife and Mahadevaraya's parents from Jackie, then known as Janaki Varma, who had been paid by Mukhtar. Jackie killed Mahadevaraya's parents and stole the magical weapon. After decapitating Mukhtar in a fight, the dying Rudra handed over his newborn son to his loyal servant Basava, who sent him away via the river. He was discovered by Siva and his wife and raised by them.

Sakthi kills Jackie and Faqtooni's brother Jaffer and retrieves the magical weapon. However, Sakthi is then betrayed and shot by Mahadevaraya's partner Prachanda, who takes the weapon and gives it to Faqtooni as she arrives with a resurrected Raakha. Mahadevaraya stabs Prachanda to death. Faqtooni forcibly takes the sage and Aishwarya to perform the compulsory rites (conducted every 27 years). Sakthi then arrives and fights Raakha and Faqtoni with the weapon. Faqtooni is thrown into a deep pit, and Raakha is killed after the sage instructs Sakthi to stab Raakha in his eyes, which had been implanted from Mukhtar's severed head, which makes Raakha die by exploding his head. Sakthi replaces the weapon in its rightful place and leaves with Aishwarya, the sage, and the gem.

== Cast ==
- N. T. Rama Rao Jr. in a dual role as
  - Sakthi Swaroop
  - Rudra (Sakthi's biological father)
- Ileana D'Cruz as Aishwarya Mahadevaraya, Sakthi's love interest
- Manjari Phadnis as Gauri, Rudra's wife and Sakthi's biological mother
- S. P. Balasubrahmanyam as Vijayaraya (Mahadevaraya's father)
- Prabhu as Central Minister Mahadevaraya (Aishwarya's father)
- Jackie Shroff as Janaki Varma / Jackie The Great
- Vidyut Jammwal as Wasim Ali (Faqtooni's younger son)
- Vinod Kumar as Prachanda
- Pooja Bedi as Faqtooni
- Sonu Sood as Mukthar (Faqtooni's husband)
- Daniel Kaleb as Raakha (Faqtooni's elder son)
- Mukthar Khan as Jaffer (Faqtooni's brother)
- Nassar as Sage
- Ali as Tommy
- Brahmanandam as Avatar
- Krishna Bhagavaan as Devudu / David
- Sayaji Shinde as Sivaji/Sivaraj, Sakthi's adopted father
- Pragathi as Siva's wife and Sakthi's adopted mother
- Dharmavarapu Subramanyam as Subba Rao
- Venu Madhav as Satti Babu
- M. S. Narayana as Haridwar priest
- Manju Bhargavi as Mahadevaraya's mother
- Chatrapathi Sekhar as Basava (Rudra's servant)

== Release ==
Sakthi was released on 1 April 2011. A dubbed Tamil and Malayalam versions of the film, titled Om Sakthi, was released on 2 April 2011.

== Reception ==
Sakthi received highly negative reviews from critics. Radhika Rajamani from Rediff.com gave the film 1.5 stars out of 5, as did The Times of India. The Times praised the cinematography, performance, music, story, visualization, action sequences, screenplay.

== Soundtrack ==
Sakthi

Soundtrack album by Mani Sharma
- Released: 27 February 2011
- Genre: Film soundtrack
- Length: 33:03
- Label: Aditya Music
- Producer: Mani Sharma

Mani Sharma chronology
| Parama Veera Chakra (2011) | Sakthi (2011) | Teen Maar (2011) |

The soundtrack, composed by Mani Sharma, was released on 27 February 2011.

| No. | Title | Lyrics | Singer(s) | Length |
|---|---|---|---|---|
| 1. | "Thaliya Thaliya" | Ramajogayya Sastry | Ranjith | 5:16 |
| 2. | "Prema Desam" | Ramajogayya Sastry | Hemachandra, Saindhavi | 4:36 |
| 3. | "Mathileka Pichiga" | Jonnavittula Ramalingeswara Rao | Ranjith, Chinmayi | 4:00 |
| 4. | "Surro Surra" | Ramajogayya Sastry | Javed Ali, Suchitra | 5:27 |
| 5. | "Yamaga Unde" | Ramajogayya Sastry | Karunya, Malavika | 4:22 |
| 6. | "Mahishasura Mardhini" | Adi Shankara | Sharath, Srivardhini | 5:52 |
| 7. | "Maha Rudhra Sakthi" | Jonnavittula Ramalingeswara Rao | Muralidhar, Ranjith, Hemachandra, Hanumantha Rao, Rita, Saindhavi, Srivardhini | 3:30 |
| Total length: | | | | 33:03 |
