= Teen Maar =

- Theatrical release poster
- Directed by: Jayanth C. Paranjee
- Written by: Story: Imtiaz Ali; Screenplay & Dialogues: Trivikram Srinivas
- Based on: Love Aaj Kal by Imtiaz Ali
- Produced by: Bandla Ganesh
- Starring: Pawan Kalyan; Trisha; Kriti Kharbanda; Paresh Rawal; Sonu Sood
- Cinematography: Jayanan Vincent
- Edited by: M. R. Varma
- Music by: Mani Sharma
- Production company: Parameswara Art Productions
- Distributed by: Bharathi Films
- Release date: 14 April 2011
- Running time: 149 minutes
- Country: India
- Language: Telugu
- Budget: ₹ 26 crores
- Box office: ₹30 crores

Teen Maar is a 2011 Indian Telugu-language romantic drama film directed by Jayanth C. Paranjee from a screenplay & dialogues written by Trivikram Srinivas. A remake of 2009 Hindi film Love Aaj Kal, it stars Pawan Kalyan in a dual role, alongside Trisha, and Kriti Kharbanda. The music was composed by Mani Sharma. The film delves into the timeless nature of love, contrasting modern relationships with traditional ones. The film was released on 14 April 2011. It was a flop at the Box Office .

== Plot ==
Michael Velayudham (Pawan Kalyan) is a chef in Italy. He is an easygoing chap who flirts with girls and enjoys his affairs. His ambition is to go to the US and work in New York for a stockbroker. He dates Meera Sastri (Trisha), an art restoration professional in Cape Town. After a year, they agree to break up as she has to move to India for work, and he believes long-distance relationships do not work.

In Cape Town, Michael meets Senapathi (Paresh Rawal), the owner of a restaurant, who narrates the love story of his friend Arjun Palwai (Pawan Kalyan) with Vasumati (Kriti Kharbanda), which occurred around 1981. Meanwhile, after Meera moves to India, Michael fails to connect with any other girl. To prove to her that he has moved on, he meets a blonde girl named Michelle (Danah Marks) in a bar and dates her. However, Meera is proposed to by her family friend, politician Sudheer (Sonu Sood), and she agrees to marry him, only to prove that she has moved on too.

Michael comes to India under some pretext and meets Meera. Frustrated that Meera married Sudheer, he becomes desperate and regrets what has happened. In his sorrow, he receives an offer for his dream job in the US. Initially, he enjoys his new job, but eventually, he feels a loneliness he does not understand.

The rest of the story focuses on how Michael realizes his mistakes and how Arjun's story impacts his decisions.

== Cast ==
- Pawan Kalyan in a dual role as
  - Michael Velayudham
  - Arjun Palwai
- Trisha as Meera Shastri
- Kriti Kharbanda as Vasumathi
- Danah Marks as Michelle
- Paresh Rawal as Senapathi
- Sonu Sood as Sudhir
- Ali as Taxi Driver
- Tanikella Bharani as Michael's father
- Sudha as Michael's mother
- Mukesh Rishi as Vasumathi's father
- Pragathi as Vasumathi's mother
- Shankar Melkote as Restaurant owner
- M. S. Narayana
- Rajitha
- Sandhya Janak

== Production ==
B. Ganesh and Pawan Kalyan acquired the rights to remake the Hindi film Love Aaj Kal for ₹4 crore (US$420,000). The film, which was earlier referred to as Khushiga and Lovely, before being officially titled as Teen Maar. The film began its production in September 2010.

== Soundtrack ==
Mani Sharma composed the songs for the film and compiled the background score. The audio of the film was released on 21 March 2011. The Audio was Released on Aditya Music.

Teen Maar

Soundtrack album by Mani Sharma
- Released: 21 March 2011
- Recorded: 2011
- Genre: Soundtrack
- Length: 30:38
- Label: Aditya Music
- Producer: Mani Sharma

Mani Sharma chronology
Shakti (2011)	Teen Maar (2011)	Maaro (2011)

Track-List
No.	Title	Lyrics	Singer(s)	Length
1.	"Aale Baale"	Bhaskarabhatla Ravi Kumar	Hemachandra, Rahul Nambiar, Sravana Bhargavi, Rita	5:07
2.	"Barbie Bommaki"	Bhaskarabhatla Ravi Kumar	Benny Dayal, Sravana Bhargavi	4:25
3.	"Chiguru Boniya"	Viswa	Viswa	4:23
4.	"Gelupu Thalupule"	Rahaman	Javed Ali (uncredited), Sreeram Chandra	5:18
5.	"Sri Ganga"	Ramajogayya Sastry	Vedala Hemachandra, Ranjith, Srivardhini, Malavika	6:04
6.	"Vayyaraala Jaabilli"	Rahaman	Karunya	5:21
Total length:				30:38

== Reception ==
The Times of India stated, "Finally, a nice, breezy mid-summer entertainer!" Rediff.com noted, "Teenmaar is entertaining despite its slow pace in parts. It's Pawan's show all the way mostly".
