= Mahanati (soundtrack) =

2018 soundtrack album by Mickey J. Meyer

Soundtrack album by Mickey J. Meyer
- Released: 1 May 2018
- Recorded: 2017–2018
- Genre: Feature film soundtrack
- Length: 20:31
- Language: Telugu
- Label: Aditya Music
- Producer: Mickey J. Meyer

Mickey J. Meyer chronology
Mister (2017)	Mahanati (2018)	Srinivasa Kalyanam (2018)
External audio
- Audio Jukebox on YouTube

Singles from Mahanati
- 1. "Mooga Manasulu" Released: 20 April 2018; 2. "Sada Nannu" Released: 26 April 2018; 3. "Gelupuleni Samaram" Released: 1 June 2018 (After the film's release)

Mahanati is the soundtrack album composed by Mickey J. Meyer for the 2018 Tollywood film of the same name written and directed by Nag Ashwin and produced by C. Ashwini Dutt, Swapna Dutt, and Priyanka Dutt under the banners Vyjayanthi Movies and Swapna Cinema. The album consists of six tracks with Sirivennela Sitaramasastri and Ramajogayya Sastry penning the lyrics. The film is based on the life of Indian actress Savitri, played by Keerthy Suresh while Dulquer Salmaan, in his Telugu debut, plays the role of Gemini Ganesan. The soundtrack album released digitally on 1 May 2018 on the Aditya Music label.

== Development ==
Mickey J. Meyer composed the film's soundtrack and score. The background music featured in the logo video, created much hype for the film. The composer revealed that, recording the title track was a huge challenge for him. In an interview with The Times of India, he stated that "I used to compose tracks while travelling and later finalising them in the studio. But, when I began recording the title track, I found that it was really tough to match the sounds of a bygone era with sensibilities of contemporary times. I hadn't watched any of the diva’s movies, but I used to listen to old Hindi songs to understand the music of those days."

== Release ==
Aditya Music acquired the film's audio rights. The first single from the film "Mooga Manasulu" written by Sirivennela Seetharama Sastry and sung by Anurag Kulkarni and Shreya Ghoshal was released on 20 April 2018. It was also released in Tamil titled "Mauna Mazhaiyile" sung by Anurag Kulkarni and Nayana Nair and written by Madhan Karky. The song has nostalgic lyrics reminiscent of the golden period of the 1970s and '80s. The second single track was released on 26 April 2018. Titled "Sada Nannu" in Telugu and "Thandhaay" in Tamil, the song was rendered by Charulatha Mani. The full album of Mahanati was released on 1 May 2018, at a grand launch event, featuring the entire cast and crew. Whereas, the album of Nadigayar Thilagam was launched on 5 May 2018.

While the soundtrack album features only five songs, in Telugu and Tamil versions, a sixth track of the film, titled "Gelupuleni Samaram" ("Amudhai Pola Kidaithaai" in Tamil), was released on 1 June 2018. The dual audio of "Mooga Manasulu" and "Mauna Mazhaiyile" was released on 27 June 2018, to commence the film's 50th day celebration.

== Track listing ==
=== Telugu ===
All lyrics are written by Sirivennela Seetharama Sastry, except the song "Mahanati" was written by Ramajogayya Sastry.

Mahanati (Original Motion Picture Soundtrack)
No.	Title	Singer(s)	Length
1.	"Mooga Manasulu"	Shreya Ghoshal, Anurag Kulkarni	4:19
2.	"Sada Nannu"	Charulatha Mani	3:37
3.	"Mahanati"	Anurag Kulkarni	4:44
4.	"Aagipo Baalyama"	Ramya Behara	2:33
5.	"Chivaraku Migiledi"	Sunitha Upadrashta	2:58
6.	"Gelupuleni Samaram"	Ramya Behara	3:41
Total length:			20:31

=== Tamil ===
All lyrics are written by Madhan Karky.

Nadigaiyar Thilagam (Original Motion Picture Soundtrack)
No.	Title	Singer(s)	Length
1.	"Mauna Mazhaiyilae"	Nayana Nair, Anurag Kulkarni	4:19
2.	"Thandhaay"	Charulatha Mani	3:37
3.	"Mahanadi"	Anurag Kulkarni	4:44
4.	"Kutti Rani"	Nayana Nair	2:33
5.	"Irudhiyil Enna Enjum"	Nayana Nair	2:58
6.	"Amudhai Pole Kidaithaai"	Nayana Nair	3:10
Total length:			20:01

== Background score ==
Mahanati

Film score by Mickey J. Meyer
- Released: 2020
- Recorded: 2018
- Genre: Film score
- Length: 46:55
- Language: Telugu
- Producer: Mickey J. Meyer

All music is composed by Mickey J. Meyer.

No.	Title	Length
1.	"Beginning and Madhura Vani's Theme"	4:15
2.	"Savitri in the Hospital"	1:13
3.	"Two Eye Drops"	1:41
4.	"Savitri's Childhood"	1:30
5.	"The Prodigy"	1:13
6.	"Earlier days in Madras"	1:59
7.	"Rendezvous with Gemini Ganeshan"	1:23
8.	"Love and Wedding"	3:08
9.	"Gemini on Bus Top"	0:50
10.	"Antony on Car Top"	2:34
11.	"Success and Further"	1:02
12.	"Other Women"	2:03
13.	"Heart Break"	2:46
14.	"Income Tax Issues"	1:01
15.	"Antony-Vani Love Theme 1"	1:06
16.	"Setbacks and Loosing everything"	5:52
17.	"Antony-Vani Love Theme 2"	3:02
18.	"Going to Bangalore"	1:05
19.	"Gelupuleni Samaram"	3:25
20.	"Finale"	4:07
Total length:		46:55

== Reception ==
The album received positive reviews from critics. Archana Nathan of Scroll.in reviewed the soundtrack, noting, "Mickey J Meyer's soundtrack for Mahanati has a song for each phase in Savitri's life, which is soulful and dramatic." Firstpost-based critic Mrudula Ramadugu stated it to be one of the finest works of Mickey J Meyer, and summarised it: "Mahanati's soulful music, is filled with tracks that are bound to make you nostalgic. Full of old world charm, the makers couldn't have produced a more apt playlist for legendary actor Savitri's biopic. Infused with melodies, goofiness, love and pain, here is how each song of this period film got us humming and dwelling in emotions."

Indiaglitz gave a rating of 3 out of 5 and stated "It's to director Nag Ashwin's credit that he defies cliches in conceiving the title song, 'Sada Ninnu', and 'Chivaraku Migiledi'. With profound lyrics and enjoyable voices, the album is a winner." Calling it an "impressive period soundtrack", Vipin Nair of MusicAloud rated the album 3.5 out of 5, with "Sada Nannu (Thandhaay)", "Aagipo Baalyama (Kutti Rani)" and "Mooga Manasulu (Mauna Mazhaiyile)" as the favourite picks. Desi Music Bazaar rated the album 4.5 out of 5 and stated "Mickey J. Meyer brings out an astounding soundtrack for Mahanati. The songs can definitely be enjoyed as standalone numbers as well as they can be joyfully experienced along with the visuals."

Telugucinema.com wrote that "The music album of Mahanati is not the regular song and dance album which you can hear on a daily basis. Every song has its own emotions and nicely depicts the story of Telugu film industry's biggest heroine to date. Mickey J Meyer brings his best as he adds a lot of pain to every number. Some of the songs Sadaa Nannu and Mooga Manasulu have a very old school charm whereas the rest of them engross you into the mood of the bygone era in their very own way."

== Album credits ==
Credits adapted from Aditya Music

- Mickey J. Meyer – Composer (All tracks), Arranger (All tracks), Programmer (All tracks), Sound Recording (Inspire Studios, Hyderabad) [All tracks], Sound Mixing (All tracks)
- Ramya Behara – Chorus (Track 3)
- Mohana Bhogaraju – Chorus (Track 3)
- Anjana Sowmya – Chorus (Track 3)
- Sravana Bhargavi – Chorus (Track 3)
- Sri Krishna – Chorus (Track 3)
- Vedala Hemachandra – Chorus (Track 3)
- Krishna Chaitanya – Chorus (Track 3)
- Deepu – Chorus (Track 3)
- Aditya Iyengar – Chorus (Track 3)
- PVNS Rohit – Chorus (Track 3)
- Pravasthi – Kids Chorus (Track 3)
- Sharmishta – Kids Chorus (Track 3)
- Karthikeya – Kids Chorus (Track 3)
- Sashank – Kids Chorus (Track 3)
- Phani Narayana Vadali – Veena (Track 1,2)
- Ravi Shankar – Flute (Track 1,2,4)
- Sam Ewens – Brass (Track 3)
- Paul Raj – Tabla, Dholki (Track 4,5)
- Venkatesh Patvari – Rhythm Programmer (All tracks)
- Darren Vermaas – Mastering (Studio Mastering) [All tracks]
