= C. Aswini Dutt =

Indian film producer (born 1950)

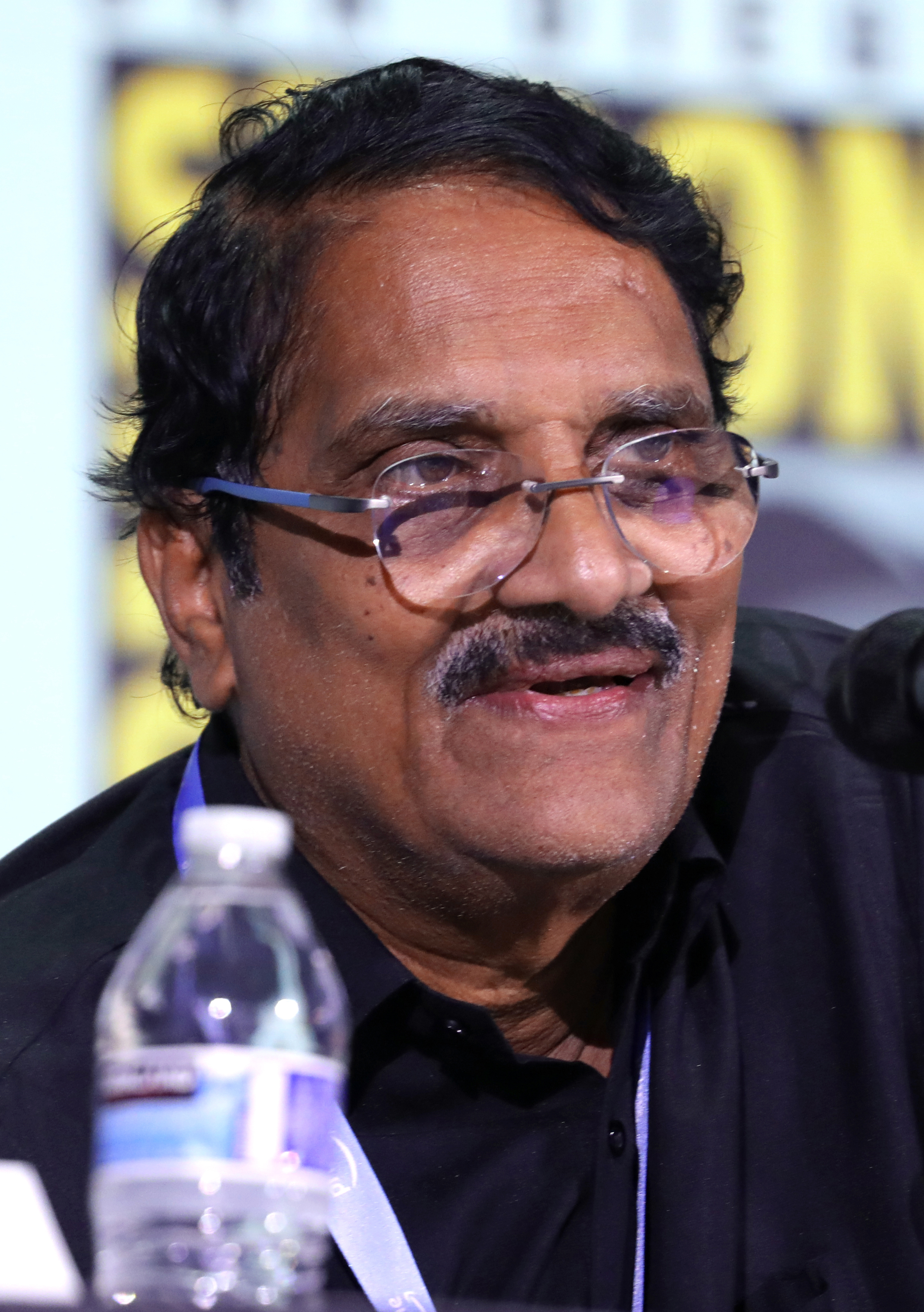
- Dutt at San Diego Comic-Con in 2023
- Born: Chalasani Aswini Dutt; 15 September 1950 (age 75); Vijayawada, Andhra Pradesh, India
- Occupation: Film producer
- Organization: Vyjayanthi Movies
- Political party: Telugu Desam Party
- Spouse: Vinaya Kumari
- Children: 3 including Swapna Dutt, Priyanka Dutt
- Awards: National Film Award for Best Feature Film in Telugu - Mahanati (2018)

Chalasani Aswini Dutt (also spelled Aswani Dutt; born 15 September 1950) is an Indian film producer primarily known for his work in Telugu cinema. He is the founder of Vyjayanthi Movies, a major film production company established in 1974. Over a career spanning five decades, Aswini Dutt has produced over 40 films, predominantly in Telugu, along with a few in other languages. He is especially known for producing high-budget films featuring major stars.

He also contested for the Vijayawada Lok Sabha constituency in the 2004 General Elections as a Telugu Desam Party candidate.

== Early and personal life ==
Aswini Dutt was born into a well-to-do family in Vijayawada, Andhra Pradesh. His father was a contractor and the sole distributor for Kalinga Pipes in the state for many years. He completed his graduation. Jandhyala, who would later go on to become a noted film director and screenwriter, was Aswini Dutt's childhood friend. They were classmates from fourth standard till their graduation and lived in neighbouring houses.

He has three daughters — Priyanka Dutt, Swapna Dutt and Sravanthi Dutt. Priyanka is married to film director Nag Ashwin who previously directed the film Yevade Subramanyam (2015) for Vyjayanthi Movies.

== Film career ==
Dutt started his film career as an executive producer for the black-and-white film O Seetha Katha (1974) directed by K. Viswanath. He wanted to produce a film with his favourite actor N. T. Rama Rao and approached him. Named by Rama Rao after the garland which is in Lord Krishna’s neck, Vyjayanthi Movies commenced production, under the proprietorship of Aswini Dutt. The logo of the production house contains the image of Rama Rao as Lord Sri Krishna, with a Sankha in his hand and Earth behind him. The first film produced under Vyjayanthi Movies banner was Eduruleni Manishi (1975) starring Rama Rao and Vanisri.

The production house went on to make films with the biggest stars of Telugu cinema: N. T. Rama Rao, Akkineni Nageswara Rao, Krishna, Sobhan Babu, Krishnam Raju, Chiranjeevi, Balakrishna, Nagarjuna, Venkatesh, Pawan Kalyan, Mahesh Babu, Ram Charan, Jr. NTR, Prabhas. They also worked with Amitabh Bachchan, Rajinikanth, Kamal Haasan, and Dulquer Salman. Many of the films produced by Vyjayanthi Movies were directed by K. Bapayya and K. Raghavendra Rao.

Vyjayanthi Movies also has subsidiary banners — Three Angels Studio, Swapna Cinema run by Aswini Dutt's daughters Swapna Dutt and Priyanka Dutt. Of late, his daughters take care of the production part of the films produced by their production house, while the music is handled Aswini Dutt.

Vyjayanthi Movies had a successful run until it hit a rough patch with Sakthi in 2011. After this, Aswini Dutt took a seven-year hiatus. He produced Mahanati in 2018 which became one of the highest-grossing films of the year.

Dutt mentions Jagadeka Veerudu Athiloka Sundari (1990) as his favourite among all the films that he produced.

== Shelved projects ==
After the success of Jagadeka Veerudu Athiloka Sundari, Aswini Dutt sought to produce a fantasy film with a focus on CGI. He initiated a project titled Bhooloka Veerudu, directed by Singeetam Srinivasa Rao, with Chiranjeevi in the lead role. However, after completing two schedules, the team realized that the film lacked a proper storyline, leading to its eventual shelving.

In another instance, Ram Gopal Varma pitched a story to Aswini Dutt, which he and Chiranjeevi both found appealing. At the time, Varma was working on Daud, and with the possibility of delays due to Sanjay Dutt's legal issues, Varma decided to present the story to Dutt and Chiranjeevi. Aswini Dutt then began the project under Varma's direction. However, after Sanjay Dutt was released, the production of Daud resumed, and Dutt realized that the storylines of both films were similar. Uncomfortable with the overlap, he chose to stall the project.

== Filmography ==
Films produced under Vyjayanti Movies banner.

Year	Film	Notes
1975	Eduruleni Manishi	Debut in Telugu cinema
1978	Yuga Purushudu	
1981	Guru Sishyulu	
1983	Adavi Simhalu	
1985	Agni Parvatam	
1986	Brahma Rudrulu	
1988	Aakhari Poratam	
1990	Jagadeka Veerudu Atiloka Sundari	
1992	Aswamedham	
1994	Govinda Govinda	
1994	Subhalagnam	
1998	Choodalani Vundi	
1999	Rajakumarudu	
1999	Ravoyi Chandamama	
2000	Azad	
2001	Premakke Sai	Debut in Kannada cinema
2002	Company	Debut in Hindi cinema
2002	Indra	
2005	Balu ABCDEFG	
2005	Subhash Chandra Bose	
2005	Jai Chiranjeeva	
2006	Sainikudu	
2007	Chirutha	
2008	Kathanayakudu	Made simultaneously with Kuselan
2008	Kantri	
2011	Sakthi	
2018	Mahanati	
2018	Devadas	
2019	Maharshi	
2022	Sita Ramam	
2024	Kalki 2898 AD	
TBA	Kalki 2898 AD : Part 2 †	

Swapna Cinema

Year	Notes
2001	Student No.1
2002	Okato Number Kurraadu
2015	Yevade Subramanyam
2018	Mahanati
2021	Jathi Ratnalu
2022	Sita Ramam
2023	Anni Manchi Sakunamule
2025	Champion

Raghavendra Movie Corporation and United Producers (Aswani Dutt, Allu Aravind, and K. Raghavendra Rao)

Release year	Film name
1996	Pelli Sandadi
1997	Mere Sapno Ki Rani (Hindi)
1998	Paradesi
1998	Ninaithen Vandhai (Tamil)
2003	Gangotri

Siri Media Arts (Aswani Dutt and Allu Aravind)

Release year	Film name
2003	Pellam Oorelithe
2003	Calcutta Mail (Hindi)
2004	Intlo Srimathi Veedhilo Kumari

Sri Priyanka Pictures

Release year	Film name
1994	Subhalagnam

Roja Art Productions

Release year	Film name
1983	Jaani Dost (Hindi)
