= Bujji & Bhairava =

2024 Indian animated television series

- Promotional poster
- Genre: Science fiction; Comedy; Adventure
- Created by: Nag Ashwin
- Written by: Sahen Upadhyay
- Directed by: Nag Ashwin
- Voices of: Prabhas; Keerthy Suresh; Brahmanandam
- Composer: Santhosh Narayanan
- Country of origin: India
- Original language: Telugu
- No. of seasons: 1
- No. of episodes: 2

Production
- Executive producers: Rahul Odak; Bharath Laxmipati
- Producer: C. Aswani Dutt
- Running time: 14 minutes
- Production companies: Vyjayanthi Animation; Green Gold Animation

Original release
- Network: Amazon Prime Video
- Release: 31 May 2024

Related
- Kalki 2898 AD

Bujji & Bhairava (stylized onscreen as B&B: Bujji & Bhairava) is an Indian Telugu-language animated science fiction comedy television miniseries created and directed by Nag Ashwin and, written by Sahen Upadhyay. It is produced by Vyjayanthi Animation and Green Gold Animation. The series is a prelude to the 2024 film Kalki 2898 AD, and has a narrative primarily about Bhairava and his AI droid/vehicle companion BU-JZ-1 (Bujji).

The series is part of The Kalki Cinematic Universe and premiered on 31 May 2024 on Amazon Prime Video. The show emerged as the most-watched Telugu show in India, in the first 6 months of 2024, with 49 lakh (4.9 million) views.

== Overview ==
The series is set two years before the events of the film in the year 2896, in Kasi. (Note: Kasi/Kashi is another name for the holy city of Varanasi, one of the oldest cities in India.) Bhairava is a bounty hunter with dreams of getting into the Complex, an inverted pyramid structure located in the heart of the city, by collecting a million "units" needed for gaining access inside. (Note: A type of universal world currency in the Kalki universe.) BU-JZ1 is an AI pilot of a cargo plane, waiting for her promotion at the Complex. At their lowest point, these two unlikely souls, find each other to set of a crackling story of ambition, adventure, partnership, and mainly friendship.

== Voice cast and characters ==
- Prabhas as Bhairava
- Keerthy Suresh as BU-JZ-1 alias Bujji, Bhairava's companion AI droid/vehicle
- Brahmanandam as Rajan, Bhairava's landlord
- Pasupathy as Veeran, a rebel from Shambhala (Note: Shambhala or Sambhal, near Kasi in northern India, is prophesied to be the birthplace of Kalki, the future avatar of Vishnu, in Hindu scriptures. This concept was later borrowed into the Kalachakra tradition of Tibetan Buddhism where it is described a mystical kingdom somewhere beyond the Himalayas and also as a state of mind.)
- Anna Ben as Kyra, Veeran's associate
- Nayantara Manchala as Archie
- Y. J. Sai Charan as:
  - Goku
  - Wong
  - Rickshaw
- Mahesh as Pilot
- Vishak as Bar Owner
- Srinivas Eetha as Raider

== Episodes ==
Series	Episodes	Originally released
1	2	31 May 2024

No.	Title	Directed by	Written by	Original release date
1	"Crash and Burn"	Nag Ashwin	Sahen Upadhyay	31 May 2024
2	"Partners"	Nag Ashwin	Sahen Upadhyay	31 May 2024

== Release ==
The show was released on 31 May 2024 on Amazon Prime Video in Telugu along with Hindi and English-language versions.

== Reception ==
Giving a positive response, Neeshita Nyayapati of Hindustan Times, praised Nag Ashwin's work and the screenplay. Echoing the same, The Hindu's Sangeetha Devi Dundoo opined that the series has succeeded in introducing the world of Kalki and the franchise.
