= Sing Geetham =

2026 Indian film by Singeetham Srinivasa Rao

- Theatrical release poster
- Directed by: Singeetham Srinivasa Rao
- Written by: Singeetham Srinivasa Rao
- Produced by: Nag Ashwin
- Starring: Ayaan Khan; Shalini Kondepudi; Ahilya Bamroo
- Cinematography: Ankur Sanjeev
- Music by: Devi Sri Prasad
- Production companies: Vyjayanthi Movies; Swapna Cinema
- Release date: 12 June 2026
- Running time: 137 minutes
- Country: India
- Language: Telugu
- Budget: ₹22 crore
- Box office: ₹6 crore

Sing Geetham is a 2026 Indian Telugu-language musical fantasy comedy drama film directed by Singeetham Srinivasa Rao. Produced by Nag Ashwin and presented by C. Aswini Dutt under Vyjayanthi Movies, the film stars Ayaan Khan, Ahilya Bamroo and Shalini Kondepudi. It has music composed by Devi Sri Prasad. Sing Geetham was released worldwide on 12 June 2026 in theatres and received critical acclaim. but, the film was a box office bomb. This is Srinivasa Rao's final film as director as he died four months after the film's release.

== Plot ==
Pratap Mannem, a former convict, arrives in Kuberapuram, an arid mining village, to claim his share of the gold mines left behind by his late father, Uday Mannem. Upon arrival, he discovers that Uday's former business partner, Brahma, along with Brahma's daughter, Renu, have usurped control of the mines and intend to sell it to an international businessman named Swahili. Pratap intervenes, asserting his rights over the mines, and proposes digging deeper into an unstable region to extract the remaining gold.

However, the excavation stalls because of a massive tree standing at the center of the land, which is the last surviving piece of greenery in the village. Gauri, a fiery young woman who lives within the hollow of the tree, vehemently opposes cutting it down, treating it as the village's final link to the nature. However, Renu proceeds to bulldoze the tree with the support of Gauri's father and the other villagers. Heartbroken and enraged by the villagers' greed, Gauri falls into a hidden subterranean cave near an altar of Kubera, the village's guardian spirit. In her despair, she prays for a curse on the village, asking the deity to strip the village's residents of their normal speech since they refused to speak when it mattered.

Kubera grants her plea, casting a divine spell that causes every resident to lose the ability to speak normally and forces everyone to communicate exclusively through song and melody. While the townspeople desperately try to break the curse, Pratap paints a deceptive mural by the deity's statue, tricking the miners into offering gold to lift the curse so they will keep digging. Further, Renu promises them a share of the mining profits. Eventually, Pratap falls in love with Gauri and discovers the truth about his past through her eccentric grandmother, Basavamma.

In a flashback, Pratap's mother, Sailaja, is a devout environmentalist who fiercely opposes Brahma's gold-mining plans. Consumed by greed, Uday allies with Brahma and bribes Basavamma to fabricate medical complications during Sailaja's pregnancy, forcing her to move to the city for childbirth. While she is away, Uday exploits the villagers and manipulates them into consenting for mining. Upon her return, Sailaja discovers the destruction and confronts Uday inside a mine, where she dies in a tragic cave-in. Guilt-ridden, Uday leaves the village with the newborn Pratap.

In the present, Pratap experiences a change of heart. He turns over the land deeds to the village workers, motivating them to abandon mining, plant trees and seek redemption. However, Renu reignites their avarice, enticing them back to digging the gold. As the villagers turn on one another in hysteria, the curse's effect escalates, causing people to turn into golden statues upon physical touch.

Horrified, the survivors attempt to flee the village through a secret underground mine shaft. During their escape, a pregnant widow goes into labor. Moved by her misery, the villagers cast aside their selfishness and form a protective human shield around her to block the collapsing cave ceiling, willingly petrifying into a golden dome to save her and her unborn child.

Witnessing this selfless sacrifice, Pratap, Gauri, a reformed Renu, and the other survivors sing in emotional unity, expressing genuine remorse for their past greed. A torrential rainfall dissolves the curse, washing over the village and restoring the golden statues back to living humans alongside restoring the villagers' voices, just as the woman gives birth to a girl child.

Years later, the villagers live in harmony with nature. A wealthy business mogul arrives and attempts to bribe the townspeople into reopening the mines. Ignoring the warnings, he deliberately steps on a plant, crushing it. Instantly, the curse reawakens, forcing the mogul into an involuntary dance as the laughing villagers walk away.

== Cast ==
- Ayaan as Pratap Mannem
- Ahilya Bamroo as Gowri
- Shalini Kondepudi as Renu
- Sivannarayana Naripeddi as Super
- Agu Stanley Chiedozie as Swahili
- Racha Ravi as Bairagi
- Yogi Khatri as Sankarayya
- Banerjee as Brahma
- Tulasi as Basavamma
- Ananth Babu as Lawyer
- Vamshidhar Goud as Dasu
- Junior Relangi as Doctor
- Mahesh Achanta as Compounder
- Jabardasth Geddam Naveen as Basava, the priest
- Srimuktha Macha as Villager
- Balguri Shiva Kumar

Cameo appearance

- Vijay Deverakonda as a business mogul
- Rahul Ravindran as Uday Mannem
- Nivetha Pethuraj as Sailaja "Sailajamma" Mannem
- K. V. Anudeep as Subba Rao (fake Pratap)

== Production ==
Singeetham Srinivasa Rao had the idea for the film even before the release of Pushpaka Vimana (1987). Due to his advanced age and health issues, he often remotely directed the film through a virtual monitor arranged at his house. Filming took place in Chennai and Hyderabad, and lasted around 77 to 78 working days. The music was composed by Devi Sri Prasad.

== Release ==
Sing Geetham was released theatrically on 12 June 2026, being pushed by a day.

== Reception ==
Sangeetha Devi Dundoo of The Hindu called Sing Geetham a "refreshing departure" from the pan-Indian films that contemporary Telugu filmmakers were aggressively pursuing, adding that it "serves as a timely reminder that the industry can still take leaps of faith and offer audiences something new". Sruthi Ganapathy Raman of The Hollywood Reporter India wrote, "Singeetam Srinivasa Rao takes this land drama and infuses it with characteristic childlike wonderment, bringing us a frothy musical that’s also an effective environmental piece". T. Maruthi Acharya of India Today wrote, "If Sing Geetham exists at all, a share of the credit belongs to director-producer Nag Ashwin's conviction. At a time when the industry increasingly rewards the familiar, he chooses to place his faith in imagination and a master storyteller who has spent a lifetime proving that impossible ideas can work". Latha Srinivasan of NDTV wrote, "At the outset, Singeetham Srinivasa Rao's musical fantasy is not just novel for Telugu cinema but for Indian cinema itself at this juncture. While Indian films predominantly feature song-and-dance routines, in Sing Geetham the dialogues themselves dissolve into song, which makes it feel refreshing and captivating".
