= Dani Sanchez-Lopez =

Spanish cinematographer (born 1981)

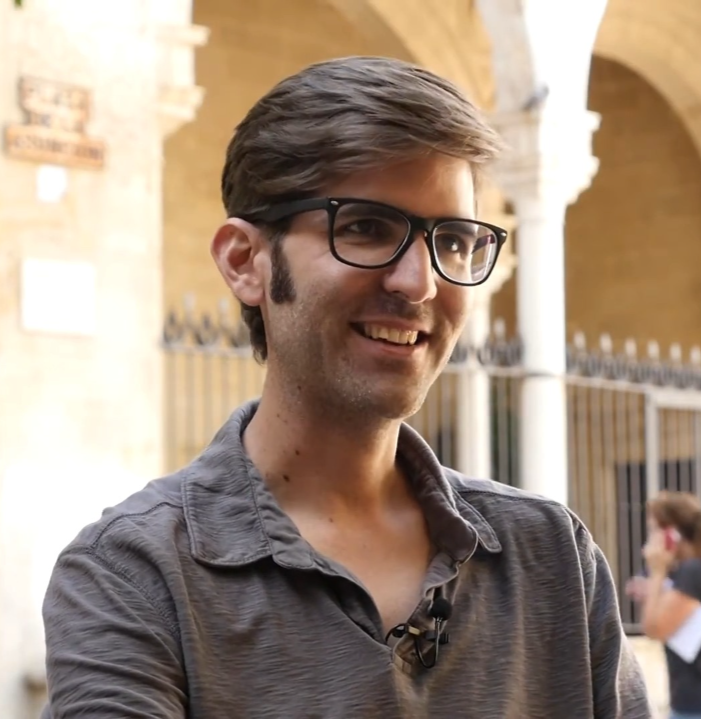
- Born: 1981 (age 44–45); Jerez de la Frontera, Spain
- Education: Dodge College of Film and Media Arts (MFA); University of Sevilla (Licenciatura, PhD)
- Occupations: Cinematographer; director; actor
- Years active: 2014–present
- Notable work: Mahanati (2018)
- Website: danisalo.com

Daniel Sanchez-Lopez (born 1981), better known as Dani SaLo, is a Spanish cinematographer, director and actor based in Los Angeles.

== Life and career ==
Dani was seven when he decided to pursue a career in cinema. He was initially drawn to acting, but later shifted his focus to writing, directing and editing after realizing that actors performed lines written by others. Eventually, he discovered a love for cinematography during his studies at Chapman University in California.

He graduated from Dodge College of Film and Media Arts with an MFA in Film Production in 2009. After completing his studies, Dani went to work in Asia due to limited work opportunities in Los Angeles. There, he collaborated with fellow alumni, Ammar Rasool and Mian Adnan Ahmad. Dani directed the music video Aik Tha Badshah for the Pakistani rock group Noori. The video was well-received and was nominated for Best Music Video at the Hum Awards in 2015.

Dani has worked on San ‘75, Tamanchey, Detective Byomkesh Bakshy! and Dil Dhadakne Do. His career in Indian cinema took a major turn in April 2017, when director Nag Ashwin invited him to join the team of Mahanati, a biopic of the iconic South Indian actress Savitri. His approach to capture the golden era of Telugu and Tamil cinema was influenced by cinematographer Marcus Bartley's work on Mayabazar and others. One of the aspects of his work on Mahanati was the decision to shoot parts of the film on super 16mm film stock to give it a 1980s appearance. Dani's work on Mahanati was highly praised, including commendation from filmmaker Singeetham Srinivasa Rao.

After Mahanati, Dani returned to Los Angeles to work on The MisEducation of Bindu. Following his collaboration with Nag Ashwin on Mahanati, Dani was initially brought on board for Ashwin's next project, Kalki 2898 AD. However, Dani was eventually replaced by Djordje Stojiljkovic. Dani's work on Virata Parvam (2022) is influenced by filmmakers and photographers, drawing inspiration from Andrei Tarkovsky’s The Mirror, Stalker and the works of Janusz Kaminski and Emmanuel Lubezki. He has a particular disdain for shooting in studio environments, preferring the challenges of real locations, where he adapts to natural lighting conditions and the physical constraints of the environment. He also conducts workshops and masterclasses at notable institutions, including the Film and Television Institute of India and Chapman University.

== Filmography ==
Year	Film	Language	Notes
2014	Tamanchey	Hindi	
2017	San' 75 Pachattar	Hindi	Unreleased film
2018	Ishqeria	Hindi	
2018	Mahanati	Telugu	
2019	The MisEducation of Bindu	English	
2022	Virata Parvam	Telugu	
2022	@Buddhistandqueer: Del sari a la túnica	Spanish	Documentary, Best short film at the 2022 LGCM Awards
2024	Operación Barrio Inglés	Spanish	Television series
2025	Kaantha	Tamil	

=== Music videos ===
List of Dani SaLo's music video credits
Year	Title	Film/Album	Language	Notes
2015	Aik Tha Badshah	Begum Gul Bakaoli Sarfarosh	Hindi	As co-director and cinematographer
2015	Calcutta Kiss Song	Detective Byomkesh Bakshy!	Hindi	As director and cinematographer
