= Eduruleni Manishi =

Eduruleni Manishi (lit. 'The Unopposed Man') may refer to these Indian Telugu-language films:

- Eduruleni Manishi (1975 film)
- Eduruleni Manishi (2001 film)
