= Yuga Purushudu =

- Theatrical release poster
- Directed by: K. Bapayya
- Written by: Jandhyala(dialogues)
- Screenplay by: K. Bapayya
- Story by: Balamurugan
- Produced by: C. Aswini Dutt
- Starring: N. T. Rama Rao; Jaya Prada
- Cinematography: S. Venkataratnam
- Edited by: Akkineni Sanjeevi
- Music by: K. V. Mahadevan
- Production company: Vyjayanthi Movies
- Release date: 14 July 1978
- Running time: 149 mins
- Country: India
- Language: Telugu

Yuga Purushudu (transl. Man of the eon) is a 1978 Indian Telugu-language action film produced by C. Aswini Dutt under the Vyjayanthi Movies banner and directed by K. Bapayya. It stars N. T. Rama Rao and Jayaprada with music composed by K. V. Mahadevan. The film was remade in Hindi as Mard Ki Zabaan (1987). The film was a box office success.

== Plot ==
Janaki, the daughter of the Pushpagiri Zamindar, marries Ranganna, a commoner, defying her father's wishes. Enraged, the Zamindar ostracizes them. The couple later has a son, Kalyan, prompting the Zamindar to reconsider and send his nephew Dhananjay to bring them back. However, Dhananjay, harbouring malicious intent, plots to kill the family under the guise of the Zamindar's orders. Ranganna is killed in the attempt, but his younger brother, Jaggu, intervenes, allowing Janaki to escape with Kalyan. Janaki entrusts Kalyan to their loyal associate Balaram. To protect Kalyan, Balaram swaps his own children, Anand and Madhavi, with Janaki's and sends Kalyan to Singapore with his brother Banerjee. Meanwhile, Ranganna's younger brother Jaggu vows revenge against the Zamindar.

Years later, Kalyan, now known as Rajesh, becomes a world martial arts champion. Latha, the Zamindar's granddaughter, admires Rajesh and falls in love with him. Meanwhile, Anand competes against Rajesh in a martial arts match to earn money for Janaki's treatment. Despite Rajesh's attempts to protect Anand, the latter sustains fatal injuries. Before dying, Anand reveals his family's true identity to Rajesh. Guilt-ridden, Rajesh quits his career and takes responsibility for Anand's family, becoming a taxi driver to support them.

One night, Rajesh rescues Latha from goons and learns that her maternal uncle, Dhananjay, and his son, Maruti Rao, pose a threat to her. Latha asks Rajesh to impersonate her long-lost cousin, Kalyan, to protect her family. Rajesh agrees and confronts Dhananjay and Maruti Rao, disrupting their plans and safeguarding the Zamindar's estate. During this time, Rajesh uncovers the impending danger the Zamindar faces from Jaggu. In a confrontation, Jaggu recognizes Rajesh as Kalyan through a tattoo on his chest and learns of the Zamindar's innocence.

The situation escalates when Dhananjay and Maruti Rao discover Janaki's whereabouts and abduct her along with the entire family. In a climactic battle, Rajesh defeats the villains and rescues his family. The film concludes with Rajesh and Latha's marriage, bringing peace to the family.

== Cast ==
- N. T. Rama Rao as Rajesh / Kalyan
- Jaya Prada as Latha
- Jaggayya as Jaggu
- Rao Gopala Rao as Balaram
- Satyanarayana as Maruti Rao
- Allu Ramalingaiah as Diwanji
- Prabhakar Reddy as Zamindar
- Raja Babu as Mohan
- Chandra Mohan as Anand
- Kanta Rao as Ranganna
- Rajanala as Benerjee
- Dhulipala as Dhanunjay
- Eswara Rao as Dr. Chandra Shekar
- Chalapathi Rao as Naveen
- Pushpalata as Janaki
- Madhavi as Madhavi
- Fatafat Jayalaxmi as Rosy
- Komilla Veerk as item number

== Soundtrack ==
Yuga Purushudu

Soundtrack album by K. V. Mahadevan
- Released: 1978
- Genre: Soundtrack
- Length: 18:42
- Label: EMI Columbia
- Producer: K. V. Mahadevan

K. V. Mahadevan chronology
Rama Krishnulu (1978)	Yuga Purushudu (1978)	Sahasavanthudu (1978)

Music composed by K. V. Mahadevan.

S. No	Song title	Lyrics	Singers	length
1	"Idigidigo Mana Hero"	Acharya Aatreya	S. P. Balasubrahmanyam, P. Susheela	3:07
2	"Gaali Mallindi"	Acharya Aatreya	S. P. Balasubrahmanyam, P. Susheela	3.03
3	"Ekku Ekku Thelaguram"	Acharya Aatreya	S. P. Balasubrahmanyam, P. Susheela	3:08
4	"Okka Raatri"	Veturi	S. P. Balasubrahmanyam, P. Susheela	3:14
5	"Bobbaralanka Chinnadi"	Veturi	S. P. Balasubrahmanyam, P. Susheela	6:10
