= Jayammu Nischayammu Raa with Jagapathi =

Indian television talk show

- Genre: Talk show
- Developed by: Paradesi
- Written by: Paradesi (2025); DNR Akurathi (2025); Pradeep Meka (since 2025); B. V. S. Ravi (since 2026)
- Directed by: Tyagaraj Ravichandra (2025); Pradeep Meka (since 2026)
- Creative directors: Pradeep Meka (2025); G. V. Cheran (since 2026)
- Presented by: Jagapathi Babu
- Theme music composer: Mickey J. Meyer
- Country of origin: India
- Original language: Telugu
- No. of seasons: 2
- No. of episodes: 18

Production
- Executive producers: Gautham Pattikonda (2025); M. Shyam Sharma (since 2026)
- Production locations: One Film Studios, Hyderabad
- Cinematography: Saravanan L
- Editors: M. V. Suresh; Jithendra Reddy; V. Suresh Babu
- Production company: Vyjayanthi Television

Original release
- Network: ZEE5; Zee Telugu
- Release: 15 August 2025 – present

Jayammu Nischayammu Raa with Jagapathi (transl. Victory is Certain with Jagapathi) is an Indian Telugu language talk show hosted by Jagapathi Babu. Produced by Vyjayanthi Television, it was first released on ZEE5 on 15 August 2025 and later, on Zee Telugu on 17 August 2025. Each episode is then first released on ZEE5 on every Friday and later telecasted on Zee Telugu on the following Sunday. The second season was premiered on 16 October 2026.

== Episodes ==
=== Season 1 (2025) ===
Episode	Premiere	Guest(s)
1	15 August 2025	Nagarjuna
Nagarjuna's siblings Akkineni Venkat and Naga Susheela were also the guests.
2	22 August 2025	Sreeleela
Sreeleela's mother Swarnalatha was also a guest.
3	29 August 2025	Nani
4	5 September 2025	Ram Gopal Varma, Sandeep Reddy Vanga
5	12 September 2025	Maheswari, Meena, Simran
6	19 September 2025	Teja Sajja
Gunasekhar, B. V. Nandini Reddy, Karthik Gattamneni and TG Vishwa Prasad were also the guests.
7	26 September 2025	Prabhu Deva
Jani Master was also the guest.
8	26 September 2025	Naga Chaitanya
Naga Chaitanya's friend Rahul was also a guest.
9	10 October 2025	Keerthy Suresh
10	17 October 2025	Ram Pothineni
11	24 October 2025	Ramya Krishna
Shobu Yarlagadda was also a guest.
12	31 October 2025	Devi Sri Prasad
13	7 November 2025	Rashmika Mandanna

=== Season 2 (2026) ===
Episode	Premiere	Guest(s)
1	16 October 2026	Sai Pallavi
2	23 October 2026	Trivikram Srinivas, Thaman S, Sunil
3	30 October 2026	Pooja Hegde, Harish Shankar
4	6 November 2026	Nara Lokesh
5	13 November 2026	Dulquer Salmaan, Shruti Haasan, Satvika Veeravalli
