= Jaani Dost =

- Theatrical release poster
- Directed by: K. Raghavendra Rao
- Written by: Kader Khan (dialogues); Indeevar (lyrics)
- Based on: Adavi Simhalu
- Produced by: C. Aswini Dutt; M.Arjuna Raju
- Starring: Dharmendra; Jeetendra; Parveen Babi; Sridevi
- Cinematography: K.S. Prakash
- Edited by: Kotagiri Venkateswara Rao
- Music by: Bappi Lahiri
- Production company: Roja Art Productions
- Release date: 27 May 1983
- Running time: 153 minutes
- Country: India
- Language: Hindi
- Budget: ₹2.6 crore (US$270,000)
- Box office: ₹3.76 crore (US$390,000) (India Net Collection)

Jaani Dost (transl. Best Friends) is a 1983 Indian Hindi-language action film, produced by C. Ashwini Dutt, M. Arjuna Raju under the Roja Art Productions banner and directed by K. Raghavendra Rao. It stars Dharmendra, Jeetendra, Parveen Babi, Sridevi, with music composed by Bappi Lahiri. The film was simultaneously made along with the Telugu-language movie Adavi Simhalu, starring Krishna, Krishnam Raju, Sridevi, Jaya Prada in the pivotal roles. Both movies were made simultaneously by the same producer and director, some of the scenes and actors are identical in the two.

== Plot ==
The film begins at Raj Nagar estate. Its owner, Raja Dharma Raj Singh, lives with his wife, Radha their son, Veeru, and they are on the verge of having a daughter. Here, vindictive Diwan Kuber Singh / Cobra ruses and slays Dharam Raj in an accident. Veeru is mislaid in it and befriends an orphan, Raju, who aims to civilize him, sacrificing his own. Years roll by, and Raju becomes a truck driver, whereas Veeru turns into a daredevil gangster as a white knight for Cobra's sibling Hari, that is always under the veil. Once, Raju secures a charming Meena, the unbeknownst sister of Veeru, and falls for her. In tandem, Veeru crushes lionhearted Shalu. Meanwhile, Raju spots Veeru's true self when discord arises, which soothes him by declaring Veeru an undercover cop. He seizes the total criminals of the country, but Hari flees. Thus, enraged Cobra incriminates Raju, forcibly knitting Meena with a stranger by endangering Radha and ploys to kill her. Just after, Cobra & Hari abscond to their crime wing of the forest. Ergo, Raju breaks the bars, and Veeru chases to hold him. Shalu also accompanies him by detecting Hari as a hoodwinker of her mother. Knowing it, Cobra attempts to destroy them, but they escape and face Meena eluded. Moreover, Veeru unearths his birth and realizes Meena is his sister. Now, Raju & Veeru tough nut Cobra in the veil of Jungle Ka Share. So, Cobra sets up a rivalry between the two, and the battle erupts when they fathom the actuality. At last, they cease Cobra & gang. Finally, the movie ends on a happy note with the marriages of Raju & Meena and Veeru & Shalu.

== Cast ==
- Dharmendra as Raju
- Jeetendra as Veeru
- Parveen Babi as Meena
- Sridevi as Shalu
- Shakti Kapoor as Naagendra
- Kader Khan as Kuber / Cobra
- Amjad Khan as Hari / Harry / Nooruddin
- Asrani as Ghasita
- Silk Smitha as Laila

== Soundtrack ==
Song	Singer
"Jawani Jawani, Jalti Jawani, Honthon Pe Aayi Hai Aag Pyar Ki"	Kishore Kumar, Asha Bhosle
"Aayi Aayi, Main To Aayi, Jannaten Chhupake Layi"	Kishore Kumar, Asha Bhosle
"Hum Nahin Jhumte Hain, Jhumta Hai Saara Jahan"	Kishore Kumar, Asha Bhosle
"Baghon Ki Tu Rani Hai, Baghon Ka Tu Rajkumar"	Kishore Kumar, Asha Bhosle
"Jeevan Bana Jeevan, Mil Gaya Tera Daman"	Kishore Kumar, Asha Bhosle
