= Agni Parvatam =

1985 film

- Poster
- Directed by: K. Raghavendra Rao
- Written by: Paruchuri Brothers
- Produced by: C. Ashwini Dutt
- Starring: Krishna; Vijayashanti; Radha; Satyanarayana; Jaggayya; Rao Gopal Rao; Prabhakar Reddy; Sharada; Poornima
- Cinematography: K. S. Prakash
- Edited by: Kotagiri Venkateswara Rao
- Music by: K. Chakravarthy
- Release date: 11 January 1985
- Running time: 143 min.
- Country: India
- Language: Telugu

Agni Parvatam (transl. Volcano) is a 1985 Indian Telugu-language film, produced by C. Ashwini Dutt and K. Raghavendra Rao under the banner of Vyjayanthi Movies and directed by K. Raghavendra Rao. The film stars Krishna, Radha, Kaikala Satyanarayana and Rao Gopala Rao in the lead roles. The film turned out to be a Blockbuster at the box office with Krishna's aggressive dialogue "Aggipetti Vunda?" (Do you have a matchbox?) becoming highly popular in the 1980s.

== Plot ==
Jagannadharao, a leading lawyer, marries Janaki and fathers a son (Master Arjun). Indrasena Varma and his friend Rudrayya addict Jagannadharao to drinking. According to the plan, they accuse Janaki as a fallen woman, and try to get rid of her along with the child, by provoking the people to stone her to death, when Jagannadharao falls unconscious owing to heavy drinking. In the temple of Shiva, Janaki names her son as Jamadagni (Krishna). She commits suicide, whilst Young Jamadagni lights the lamp at the Shivalinga. Young Jamadagni takes his dead mother on a small wheel cart to a graveyard, and there he performs cremation. Jaggayya marries Parvatamma for the second time and fathers a son named Chandram (Krishna) and a daughter (Poornima). Parvatamma learns about the treachery and threatens Indrasena Varma and Rudrayya that she would call the police. Nevertheless, she loses her eyesight when pushed by Indrasena Varma and Rudrayya, whilst Jagannadharao is struck by hand paralysis. Indrasena Varma and Rudrayya grab the property of Jagannadharao. Paralyzed, Jagannadharao and his family leaves the riches.

Years pass. Jamadagni, who leads an orphan life, grows into a very rich and powerful man in later years. He develops a desire for vengeance against his father, for his mother's death because of accusations and his orphan status. He grabs money from the smugglers and wins the hearts of poor people. He starts to construct a corporate hospital for the poor and gives employment to the poor in the construction. Vijaya, an orphan woman, joins the construction. Jamadagni saves Vijaya from falling from the top when ascending a ladder carrying bricks on her head.

Lully (Radha), the only daughter of Indrasena Varma, comes from America, insisting on appointing a personal assistant for her. On a horse ride, she is saved by Chandram, who is in the trail of a job. Chandram agrees to join in the job as a personal assistant on the condition that his mother should regain her eyesight with the operation fee paid by Indrasena Varma.

Vijaya (Vijayashanti) is saved by Jamadagni when she is abducted by a few rowdies to a house of prostitution. Jamadagni entrusts Vijaya, the job of preserving respect for his house. Vijaya tries to win the heart of aggressive Jamadagni, and when asked by visitors, she introduces herself as his mistress. Her behavior aggravates Jamadagni. Once Jamadagni warns the doctor (Nootan Prasad), who became the cause of the death of a pregnant woman by demanding money.

Chandram becomes a police inspector after passing the examinations. Indrasena Varma learns that Chandram's mother is none other than Parvatamma, who lost her eyes because of him, and quits his promise of paying the fee for the operation. Aggravatedly, Chandaram kidnaps Lully to win the money for his mother's eye operation. Lully falls in love with Chandram in no time.

Indrasena Varma orders his men to kill Parvatamma. But luckily, she is saved by Jamadagni. Parvatamma is shocked to see that Jamadagni resembles her son in physical features. She invites him to her house, but Jagannadharao hides behind a door. Jamadagni introduces himself as an orphan, revealing that his mother was abandoned by his father and was killed. He expresses his desires for vengeance against his father. When Jamadagni leaves, Jagannadharao reveals that Jamadagni is the son of Janaki, his first wife. Indrasena Varma and Rudrayya plan to book a false case against Jamadagni by placing a dead man in the back of the car. After a fight with Jamadagni, Chandram knows the fact that the person in the car was a dead man in a government hospital.

Indrasena Varma and Rudrayya are confused about the features of Chandram and Jamadagni. Paapi, the faithful assistant of Indrasena Varma, reveals the fact that Chandram is the son of Parvatamma, and Jamadagni is the son of Janaki. Indrasena Varma and Rudrayya plan to give the hand of Lully to Satyanarayana, one of the two sons of Rudrayya, in marriage. According to a plan, Indrasena Varma writes a letter to Jamadagni, revealing that he will take revenge on Jagannadharao, who is performing the wedding of his daughter. Jamadagni ties the Mangalsutra to the neck of Vijaya and insists on her upsetting the wedding of Jaggaya's daughter in the name of an illicit relationship between the groom and herself. She does it, and Jamadagni upsets the wedding. Parvatamma pleads Jamadagni not to make her a widow by killing Jagannadharao, her husband.

Jagannadharao takes poison and visits Jamadagni. He reveals the flashback of how he was made to abandon Janaki and how she was killed. Jamadagni knows the truth, and Jagannadharao dies after revealing the flashback. Chandram learns that Jamadagni is his elder brother. Indrasena Varma and Rudrayya plan to arrest Jamadagni by killing the patients in the hospital. Jamadagni asks Chandram to take him to the hospital, and there he escapes. Vijaya is abducted by Indrasena Varma and Rudrayya. The movie ends with Jamadagni killing Indrasena Varma and Rudrayya, Jamadagni remarrying Vijaya, and the temporal arrest of Jamadagni.

== Cast ==
Actor	Characters
Krishna	Chandram and Jamadagni (dual role)
Jaggayya	Jagannadharao
Rao Gopal Rao	Indrasena Varma
Dr. Prabhakar Reddy	Rudrayya
Allu Rama Lingaiah	Paapi
Vijayashanti	Vijaya (Voice Dubbed by Durga)
Radha	Radha or Lulli
Kaikala Satyanarayana	
Nagesh	
Nutan Prasad	
Saradhi	
Master Arjun	
Sharada	Janaki (Guest)
Annapoorna	Parvathamma
Poornima	

== Soundtrack ==
All lyrics are written by Veturi; all music is composed by K. Chakravarthy.

Track list
No.	Title	Singer(s)	Length
1.	"Goda Dooki Vachava"	S. P. Balasubrahmanyam, S. Janaki
2.	"Ide Ide"	S. P. Balasubrahmanyam, S. Janaki
3.	"Vayyaralu Singaralu"	S. P. Balasubrahmanyam, S. Janaki
4.	"One One No.1"	S. P. Balasubrahmanyam, S. Janaki
5.	"Rave English Rambha"	S. P. Balasubrahmanyam, P. Susheela
6.	"Ee Gaalilo"	S. P. Balasubrahmanyam, S. Janaki

== Box office ==
The film celebrated a theatrical run of more than 125 days in 8 centers across the erstwhile Andhra Pradesh.
