= Subash Chandra Bose (film) =

- Directed by: K. Raghavendra Rao
- Written by: Paruchuri Brothers (dialogues)
- Screenplay by: K. Raghavendra Rao
- Story by: Satyanand
- Produced by: Swapna Dutt
- Starring: Venkatesh; Genelia D'Souza; Shriya Saran
- Cinematography: K. Bhupati
- Edited by: Kotagiri Venkateswara Rao
- Music by: Mani Sharma
- Production company: Vyjayanthi Movies
- Release date: 22 April 2005 (India)
- Running time: 155 minutes
- Country: India
- Language: Telugu

Subash Chandra Bose is a 2005 Indian Telugu-language historical action drama film directed by veteran director, K. Raghavendra Rao, in his 101st directorial. It was produced by Swapna Dutt, under Vyjayanthi Movies. It starred Venkatesh, Genelia D'Souza, Shriya Saran, and Prakash Raj. The music was composed by Mani Sharma. It was a disaster at the box office.

== Plot ==
The story takes place during the pre-Independence era, just before the British left India.

Ashok, who is currently working on a TV channel with his girlfriend Anita, covers the meeting of a politician, Venkat Ratnam. Seeing Venkat Ratnam there, Ashok recalls images from the bygone era, including a tattoo of the national flag on his hand. In a flashback, it is revealed that in the year 1946, a man named Amarchandra / Subash Chandra Bose alias Chandram fights against local colonial officer George. Subash Chandra Bose is a real freedom fighter. When the state governor Jackson comes to Chintapalli along with his daughter Diana for a brief vacation, Bose welcomes him by blowing up the water tank in his palace. Enraged, Jackson asks his army to kill Bose. With the help of a local native, Bandodu, George's troops wipe out the entire village population, including Bose's lover, Swarajyam. In an act of betrayal by Bandodu, the troops kill Bose too. Ashok realizes that he is the reincarnation of Bose, and Venkat Ratnam is Bandodu. He sets out to expose him along with his allies. In the climax, Bose leaves Venkat Ratnam to die.

== Cast ==
- Venkatesh in a dual role as
  - Amarchandra aka Chandram / Subash Chandra Bose
  - Ashok (Second Birth)
- Genelia D'Souza as Anita
- Shriya Saran as Swarajyam
- Prakash Raj as Venkat Rathnam aka Bandodu
- Tanikella Bharani as Bapiveedu, Bose's father in the previous birth
- Gulshan Grover as Officer George (voice dubbed by P. Ravi Shankar)
- Raza Murad as Ranjit Singh
- Tom Alter as Governor Jackson
- Brahmanandam as Balram
- Sunil as Chandram, (Ashok)'s friend
- Ali as Kareem
- L. B. Sriram as RTO Officer
- Vinaya Prasad as Snehalatha, Amarchandra's mother
- Sudha as Pilli Nirmala Simha, Ashok's mother
- Subbaraju as Rajaratnam, Venkat Rathnam's younger son (voice dubbed by P. Ravi Shankar)
- Naramalli Sivaprasad as Washerman
- Maalin Maria Mobargh as Diana
- Malladi Raghava as Anitha's father
- Vinaya Prasad as Lakshmi, Bose's Mother in the previous birth
- Kota Srinivasa Rao as Tahsildar
- Babu Mohan as Raju, Assistant to Tahsildar
- Venu Madhav as Venu, Chandram's Friend in the previous birth
- Paruchuri Venkateswara Rao as Venkatachalam, Swarajyam's father
- Chandra Mohan as Chandram, Ashok's father
- Krishna Bhagavan as Jayarathnam, Venkatarathnam's elder son
- Subbaraya Sharma
- Chitti Babu
- Gautam Raju
- Hari Kishan
- Manik
- Kalpana
- Swathi
- Apoorva
- Shobha Rani
- Baby Kavya Kalyanram
- P. Ravi Shankar as a narrator

== Soundtrack ==
Subhash Chandra Bose

Film score The Official Motion Picture Soundtrack by Mani Sharma
- Released: 21 March 2005
- Genre: Soundtrack
- Length: 30:35
- Label: Aditya Music
- Producer: Mani Sharma

Mani Sharma chronology
Athanokkade (2005)	Subhash Chandra Bose (2005)	Narasimhudu (2005)

Music was composed by Mani Sharma. Music was released on ADITYA Music Company. The song "Mokka Jonna" is partially based on Sharma's own Tamil song "Ug Ug Uganda" which he composed for Tamil film Alaudin. The audio was launched by different personalities at different cities, like for instance, Dasari Narayana Rao released it in Delhi, S. P. Balasubrahmanyam in Chennai and Bhumika in Mumbai.

No.	Title	Lyrics	Singer(s)	Length
1.	"Jajiri Jajiri"	Chandrabose	S. P. Balasubrahmanyam, Shreya Ghoshal, Sunitha Sarathy	4:35
2.	"Neredu Pallu"	Suddala Ashok Teja	Hariharan, Mahalakshmi Iyer	5:06
3.	"Mokka Jonna Thotalo"	Chandrabose	Udit Narayan, Sujatha Mohan	6:32
4.	"Abraka Dabra"	Chandrabose	K. S. Chithra, Rajesh Krishnan	4:26
5.	"Me Intlo Amma Naanna"	Chandrabose	Mallikarjun, Ganga, Premji Amaren	4:38
6.	"Vandemataram (Jai Hind/Subash Chandu)"	Suddala Ashok Teja	SP Balasubrahmanyam, Anuradha Paudwal	3:47
Total length:				30:35

== Release ==
=== Critical reception ===
The movie generally received mixed reviews from critics. Venkatesh performance as describe by reviewer, "Venkatesh is impressive as Ashok. The character of Subash Chandra Bose did not suit Venkatesh"; "Venkatesh did well in both roles of Chandram and Ashok. However, the characterizations of these two characters are not good enough to exploit the histrionics of Venkatesh. He has shown variation in the get-up of both the characters";"Venkatesh sleep-walks in his dual role as Ashok and Chandram". Among the heroines reviewers describe Shriya's performance as "Shriya, who plays Venkatesh’s lover in the past, looks glamorous, but is there just for the usual song ‘n’ dance routine"; "Shriya is sexy and her movements are very sensuous."; " Shriya is cute in the role of innocent patriotic village belle. Her costumes are very simple as they represent the culture of 1940s. She is sensuous and at the same time voluptuous in the song of 'Neredi Pandu'.". While Genelia receive mostly negative review from the critics. This is mainly due to Genelia's character was short and weak compare to Shriya and she also fails to perform well. Technically the film receive mostly negative review because the lack of perfection in the story and the poor handling in the direction.

=== Box-office ===
The film eventually became a flop at the box office.

== Awards ==
Nandi Awards

- Best Editor - Kotagiri Venkateswara Rao
- Best Costume Designer - Basha
- Best Makeup - R. V. Raghava
