= Swapna Dutt =

Indian film producer (born 1981)

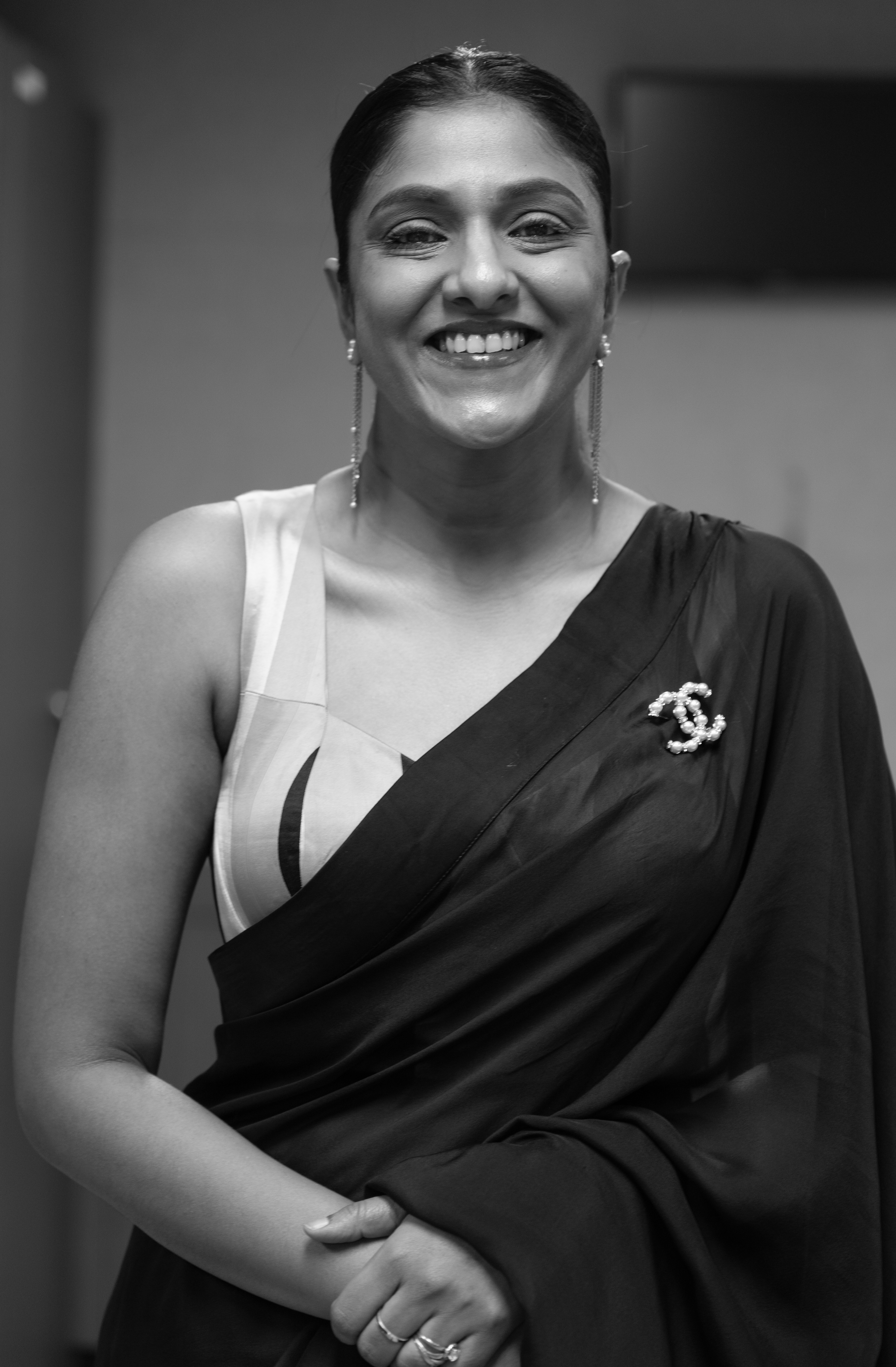
- Swapna Dutt in 2024
- Born: Swapna Dutt Chalasani; 30 August 1981 (age 45); Vijayawada, Andhra Pradesh, India
- Education: The University of Findlay
- Occupation: Film producer
- Years active: 2000–present
- Organization(s): Vyjayanthi Movies; Swapna Cinema
- Spouse: Prasad Varma
- Children: 1
- Parent: C. Aswani Dutt (Father)
- Relatives: Priyanka Dutt (Sister); Nag Ashwin (Brother-in-law); Sravanthi Dutt (Sister)
- Awards: National Film Award for Best Feature Film in Telugu - Mahanati (2018)

Chalasani Swapna Dutt (born 30 August 1981) is an Indian film producer known for her work in Telugu cinema. She is the daughter of C. Ashwini Dutt, a well-known Indian film producer and the founder of Vyjayanthi Movies.

She began her career in filmmaking at the age of 18 as an associate producer of the movie Azad (2000). Soon after her first project, she co-produced movies with her father under his banner Vyjayanthi Movies with her sister Priyanka Dutt. Both Priyanka and Swapna revived Swapna Cinema in 2014. Swapna later produced Mahanati, for which she received a National Award, and later, Sita Ramam.

== Early life and family ==
Born in Vijayawada to a family involved in Telugu cinema, Swapna is the eldest daughter of C. Aswani Dutt and Vinaya Kumari. She has two younger sisters: Priyanka Dutt, who co-produces movies with Swapna and Sravanthi Dutt, who is a businesswoman in the hospitality sector. On 19 December 2010, Swapna married Prasad Varma. They have a daughter, Navya Vyjayanthi.

== Career ==
=== Television ===
She studied business management at The University of Findlay.

=== Films ===
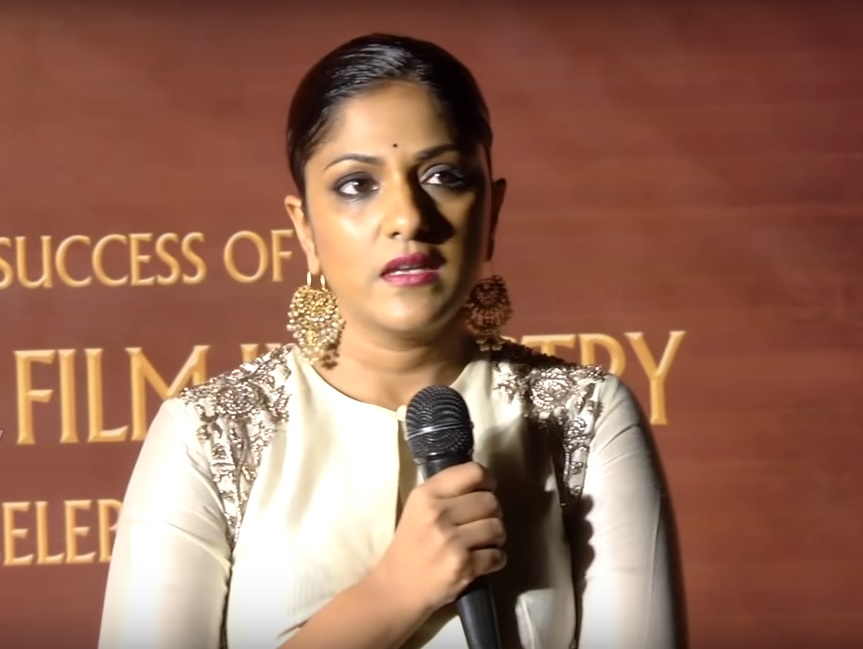
Dutt at the success meet of Mahanati in May 2018

In 2014, Swapna launched Swapna Cinema. Under the banner, Swapna and her sister Priyanka co-produced Yevade Subramanyam, directed by Priyanka's husband Nag Ashwin. Much of the filming took place at the Everest Base Camps, becoming the first Indian film to be shot at the location.

== Filmography ==
=== Films ===
Year	Title	Role	Company
2000	Azad	Associate Producer	Vyjayanthi Movies
2005	Jai Chiranjeeva	Line Producer	Vyjayanthi Movies
2005	Subhash Chandra Bose	Producer	Vyjayanthi Movies
2015	Yevade Subramanyam	Producer	Swapna Cinema
2018	Mahanati	Producer	Swapna Cinema
2022	Sita Ramam	Producer	Swapna Cinema
2024	Kalki 2898 AD	Co-producer	Vyjayanthi Movies
2025	Champion	Co-producer	Swapna Cinema

=== Television ===
Title	Role	Channel
Sa Ri Ga Ma Pa	Producer	Zee Telugu
Sa Ri Ga Ma Pa L'il Champs	Producer	Zee Telugu
Saptaswaralu	Producer	ETV Telugu
Jagadam	Producer	Local TV; Zee Telugu
Jayapradam	Producer	Local TV; Maa TV; ETV Telugu
Raju Rani Jagapathi	Producer	ETV Telugu
Super	Producer	ETV Telugu
Gata Jhanma Rahasyam	Producer	Maa TV
Narthana sala	Producer	ETV Telugu
Narthana sala 2	Producer	ETV Telugu
Nee Kongu Bangaaram Kanu	Producer	Maa TV
Nee Kongu Bangaaram Kanu 2	Producer	Maa TV
Jhummandi Naadam	Producer	ETV Telugu
Jhummandi Naadam 2	Producer	ETV Telugu

=== Web Series ===
Year	Title	Role	Language	Streaming Service
2018	Gangstars	Producer	Telugu	Amazon Prime Video
2023	Kumari Srimathi	Producer	Telugu	Amazon Prime Video

== Awards ==
- Nandi Award for Best Feature Film - Yevade Subramanyam (2015)
- Filmfare Award for Best Film - Telugu - Mahanati (2018)
- SIIMA Award for Best Film - Mahanati (2018)
- Zee Cine Awards Telugu - Mahanati (2018)
- National Film Award for Best Feature Film in Telugu - Mahanati (2018)
