= Kumari Srimathi =

Indian drama series

- Genre: Drama
- Created by: Srinivas Avasarala
- Written by: Uday Aghamarshan; Jayanth Tadinada; Kaushik Subrahmanya; Srinivas Avasarala
- Screenplay by: Srinivas Avasarala
- Story by: Balabadhrapathruni Ramani
- Directed by: Gomtesh Upadhye
- Starring: Nithya Menen; Gauthami; Nirupam paritala; Thiruveer
- Composers: Kamran; Staccato
- Country of origin: India
- Original language: Telugu
- No. of seasons: 1
- No. of episodes: 7 (list of episodes)

Production
- Producers: Priyanka Dutt; Swapna Dutt
- Cinematography: Mohana Krishna
- Editor: Srujana Adusumilli
- Camera setup: Multi-camera
- Running time: 45 minutes
- Production company: Early Monsoon Tales

Original release
- Network: Amazon Prime Video
- Release: 28 September 2023

Kumari Srimathi is an Indian Telugu-language drama television series created by Srinivas Avasarala and written by him, Uday Aghamarshan, Jayanth Tadinada and Kaushik Subrahmanya. It is directed by Gomtesh Upadhye. The series was produced by Priyanka Dutt and Swapna Dutt under the banner of Early Monsoon Tales, stars Nithya Menen, Gauthami, Nirupam paritala and Thiruveer in the lead. It premiered on Amazon Prime Video on 28 September 2023. It received mixed to positive reviews from critics. and audience.

== Plot ==
This series shows the hardwork of Srimathi who with her passion and business tries to buy back her ancestral property from her uncle. Srimathi (Nithya Menen) is working in a restaurant and earning a salary of Rs. 13,000/- per month. Property case against her uncle is going on in the court. In one of the court hearings, her uncle submitted a will wherein it is mentioned that her grandfather has written a will in favour of his uncle and he doesn't give even a single penny to his other son (Srimathi's father).

In the court hearing, Judge pronounced that the actual cost of that ancestral property in 38 lakhs and also said if Srimathi wants then she can give 38 lakhs to her uncle and buy that property.

Srimathi decides to leave her job and starts her own restaurant and bar in the village. She is successful and manages to pay off the debt.

== Cast ==
- Nithya Menen as Itikelapudi Kumari Srimathi "Siri"
  - Akshara as Child Srimathi
  - Sahasra as Young Srimathi
- Gauthami as Itikelapudi Devika, Srimathi's and Kalyani's mother
- Thiruveer as Abhinav "Abhi", Srimathi's love interest and schoolmate
- Nirupam Paritala as Jakkampudi Sriram, Srimathi's neighbor, friend and owner of Srimathi's house; had one side feelings on Srimathi.
- Talluri Rameshwari as Itikelapudi Seshamma, Srimathi's paternal grandmother
- Praneeta Patnaik as Itikelapudi Kalyani, Srimathi's younger sister
- Prem Sagar as Itikelapudi Keshav Rao, Srimathi's uncle and Prabhakar Rao's younger son
- Mahesh Achanta as Chanti
- Vasu Inturi as Advocate Thimmayya; Keshav Rao's lawyer
- Ushasree as Hema, Srimathi's best friend and colleague who becomes her business partner.
- Lakshmi Vennela as Jakkampudi Valli, Sriram's younger sister
- Madhavi Lata as Jakkampudi Swarnamma, Sriram's and Valli's mother
- Srinivas Gavi Reddy as Uyyampati Dorababu; Srimathi's former classmate who becomes her business partner.
- Akshay Lagusani as Santhosh; a photographer and Kalyani's love interest
- Ramani as Lakshmi; Devika's friend and a matchmaker
- Srinivas Avasarala in a Cameo Appearance as excise officer who is a former prospective bridegroom to Srimathi.
- Murali Mohan in a cameo appearance as Itikelapudi Prabhakar Rao, Srimathi's grandfather
- Naresh in a cameo appearance as Itikelapudi Visweshwar Rao, Srimathi's father and Prabhakar Rao's elder son
- Babu Mohan in a Cameo Appearance as Justice Solomon Raju
- Nani in a cameo appearance as himself
- Noel Sean in a cameo appearance as Nani's colleague.
- Prudhvi Raj Palaparthi

== Episodes ==
No. overall	No. in season	Title	Directed by	Written by	Original release date
1	1	"Rajnikanth. Abdul Kalam. Itikelapudi Srimathi."	Gomtesh Upadhye	Uday Aghamarshan; Jayanth Tadinada; Kaushik Subrahmanya; Srinivas Avasarala	28 September 2023
2	2	"Muhurtalu Pettukondi."	Gomtesh Upadhye	Uday Aghamarshan; Jayanth Tadinada; Kaushik Subrahmanya; Srinivas Avasarala	28 September 2023
3	3	"Saarochhaaru"	Gomtesh Upadhye	Uday Aghamarshan; Jayanth Tadinada; Kaushik Subrahmanya; Srinivas Avasarala	28 September 2023
4	4	"Taagipoduru Gaaka"	Gomtesh Upadhye	Uday Aghamarshan; Jayanth Tadinada; Kaushik Subrahmanya; Srinivas Avasarala	28 September 2023
5	5	"Laabhamgaa Thaagandi"	Gomtesh Upadhye	Uday Aghamarshan; Jayanth Tadinada; Kaushik Subrahmanya; Srinivas Avasarala	28 September 2023
6	6	"Kshemamgaa Thaagandi"	Gomtesh Upadhye	Uday Aghamarshan; Jayanth Tadinada; Kaushik Subrahmanya; Srinivas Avasarala	28 September 2023
7	7	"Willa? Illa? Milla?"	Gomtesh Upadhye	Uday Aghamarshan; Jayanth Tadinada; Kaushik Subrahmanya; Srinivas Avasarala	28 September 2023

== Production ==
The announcement of the series was made by Amazon Prime consisting of seven episode. The principal photography of the series commenced in 2023. Nithya Menen, Gauthami and Thiruveer joined the cast.

== Reception ==
Janani K of India Today awarded the series 3/5 stars. Srivathsan Nadadhur of OTTPlay rated the series 3/5 stars. Subhash K. Jha of Times Now gave the series 4/5 stars.

The series was also reviewed by Vinamra Mathur for Firstpost, and Sangeetha Devi Dundoo for The Hindu.

== See also ==
- List of Amazon India originals
