= Guru Sishyulu (1981 film) =

- Theatrical release poster
- Directed by: K. Bapayya
- Written by: Jandhyala (dialogues)
- Screenplay by: K. Bapayya
- Story by: V. C. Guhanathan
- Produced by: C. Ashwini Dutt
- Starring: Akkineni Nageswara Rao; Krishna; Sridevi; Sujatha
- Cinematography: P. L. Roy
- Edited by: Gautham Raju
- Music by: K. V. Mahadevan
- Production company: Vyjayanthi Movies
- Release date: 21 March 1981
- Running time: 151 mins
- Country: India
- Language: Telugu

Guru Sishyulu (transl. Teacher-Student) is a 1981 Telugu-language comedy film, produced by C. Ashwini Dutt under the Vyjayanthi Movies banner and directed by K. Bapayya. It stars Akkineni Nageswara Rao, Krishna, Sridevi and Sujatha, with music composed by K. V. Mahadevan.

== Plot ==
The film begins with Zamindar Gajapathi Rao fixing his younger brother Bhujangam's wedding with his love Suguna. However, Gajapathi Rao's wife, Parvathi, denies the alliance due to Suguna's promiscuous nature. So, Bhujangam, a vicious person, manipulates Gajapathi Rao into participating in the murder of Suguna's brother, Balaram. In the court, he forcibly makes Parvathi lie that she has illicit relations with Balaram, which leads to Gajapathi Rao's death. After that, pregnant Parvathi knows the evil trap of Bhujangam and tries to commit suicide when a compounder, Veeraraju, protects her. Time passes, and Parvathi gives birth to twins when a millionaire Raj Gopal's wife Meenakshi goes into miscarriage to save her—Veeraraju handovers the elder one, Kalyan, to him. After that, Parvathi disappears, leaving the younger Gopi's responsibility to Veeraraju. After some time, Raj Gopal is blessed with one more, Kamal, and even Veeraraju with a baby girl, Shanti.

Years roll by, and Kalyan, a good-nurtured person who enjoys life in the frolic, returns from abroad. Meanwhile, Gopi, a naughty guy, always stands for purity. Shanti takes household responsibility and always seeks Gopi to take up a job. At present, Bhujangam is a giant gangster, and his son Raja nets the beautiful girls. On the occasion of Kalyan's arrival, they organize a party in a hotel where Shanti works. She dislikes Kalyan's flirting behavior, but he admires her—Kamal, a heinous snares, a staff girl, Prema, on Kalyan's behalf. Thus, Shanti's loathe for him magnifies increases, and she spurns his proposal, yet Kalyan pledges to wedlock her.

Parallelly, Meenakshi's brother Pachalla Picheswrara Rao wants to couple up his daughter Latha with Kalyan and asks him to send a photograph to her. At the same time, Gopi applies for a job in Kalyan's company with his photograph; fortuitously, Latha receives it, and she falls for him. Once Suguna witnesses Parvathi when she goes through an accident, Kalyan joins her in the hospital, where she notices Veeraraju and hiddenly views Gopi. Besides that, Kamal has merged the crime line, too, with another gangster, Seshu. In the meantime, Latha arrives and meets Gopi, but he runs away and looks at her. Picheswara Rao blames Kalyan for the deed, and then he recollects the mistake. Fortunately, Kalyan makes acquaintance with Gopi, and they play a confusing drama. After a few comic incidents, Latha learns the truth but understands the true love of Gopi. Eventually, Veeraraju greets Meenakshi, and both converse regarding the past, which Kamal overhears and hits his mother. Then she claims Kalyan as her own, so Kamal leaves the house.

Hereafter, Kalyan moves Gopi about his marriage proposal with Shanti, which she denounces for cheating on Prema when Kalyan and Gopi start digging into the matter. During that time, Kamal makes a business deal with Seshu and Bhujangam but double-crosses' them and hides the treasure. Eventually, Kalyan and Gopi catch him and perform his marriage with Prema. Hereabouts, Shanti realizes her mistake and starts loving Kalyan. Veeraraju, too, reveals Kalyan and Gopi's birth secret when the brothers unite. Now, a dead-heat situation occurs: Seshu abducts Kamal, and Bhujangam captures Shanti, who gives a call to Kalyan & Gopi, respectively, for the treasure. Simultaneously, Parvathi spots Bhujangam's men seizing Gopi behind them, but they clutch her. At last, Kalyan & Gopi gamely cease the baddies and protect their men. Finally, the movie ends on a happy note with the marriages of Kalyan with Shanti & Gopi with Latha.

== Cast ==
- Akkineni Nageswara Rao as Kalyan
- Krishna as Gopi
- Sridevi as Latha
- Sujatha as Shanti
- Satyanarayana as Raja
- Giri Babu as Kamal
- Jaggayya as Raj Gopal
- Kanta Rao as Gajapathi Rao
- Nagabhushanam as Bhujangam
- Allu Ramalingaiah as Pachalla Picheswrara Rao
- Thyagaraju as Seshu
- Bhanu Prakash as Veeraraju
- Ch. Krishna Murthy as Balaram
- Chidatala Appa Rao
- Dham
- Anjali Devi as Parvathi
- S. Varalakshmi as Meenakshi
- Krishnaveni as Prema
- Vijaya Lakshmi as Suguna
- Subhashini as item number
- Halam as item number
- Chalapathi Rao

== Soundtrack ==
Guru Sishyulu

Film score by K. V. Mahadevan
- Released: 1981
- Genre: Soundtrack
- Length: 24:28
- Producer: K. V. Mahadevan

K. V. Mahadevan chronology
Agni Poolu (1981)	Guru Sishyulu (1981)	Prema Mandiram (1981)

Music was composed by K. V. Mahadevan. Lyrics were written by Acharya Aatreya.

S. No.	Song title	Singers	length
1	"Apalam Chapalam"	S. P. Balasubrahmanyam	3:50
2	"Cheyyi Paddadi"	S. P. Balasubrahmanyam, P. Susheela	4:18
3	"Chukkesu Kovali"	S. P. Balasubrahmanyam, P. Susheela	4:01
4	"Apuroopa"	S. P. Balasubrahmanyam, P. Susheela	4:30
5	"Taggu Taggu Taggu"	S. P. Balasubrahmanyam, P. Susheela	4:14
6	"Idigo Vasthuna"	S. P. Balasubrahmanyam	3:35
7	"Lattu Pattu"	S. P. Balasubrahmanyam, P. Susheela	4:17
