= Adavi Simhalu =

- Theatrical release poster
- Directed by: K. Raghavendra Rao
- Written by: Satyanand (dialogues)
- Screenplay by: K. Raghavendra Rao
- Produced by: C. Ashwini Dutt
- Starring: Krishna; Krishnam Raju; Jaya Prada; Sridevi
- Cinematography: K. S. Prakash
- Edited by: Kotagiri Venkateswara Rao
- Music by: Chakravarthy
- Production company: Vyjayanthi Movies
- Release date: 28 April 1983
- Country: India
- Language: Telugu

Adavi Simhalu (transl. Forest Lions) is a 1983 Telugu-language action film, produced by C. Ashwini Dutt under the Vyjayanthi Movies banner and directed by K. Raghavendra Rao. The film stars Krishna, Krishnam Raju, Jaya Prada, Sridevi and music composed by Chakravarthy. The film was simultaneously made in Hindi as Jaani Dost with Dharmendra, Jeetendra, Sridevi and Parveen Babi in pivotal roles. Both movies were made simultaneously by the same banner and director, some of the scenes and artists are replicated in both versions.

== Cast ==
- Krishna as Krishna
- Krishnam Raju as Raju
- Jaya Prada as Lalita
- Sridevi as Rekha
- Rao Gopal Rao as Cobra Kondala Rao
- Satyanarayana as Hari
- Allu Ramalingaiah
- Prasad Babu as Naagu
- P. J. Sarma as Dada
- Narra Venkateswara Rao
- Chalapathi Rao
- Malladi as Priest
- Mada
- Krishna Kumari as Annapurnamma
- Mucherla Aruna
- Silk Smitha
