= Nag Ashwin =

Indian filmmaker (born 1986)

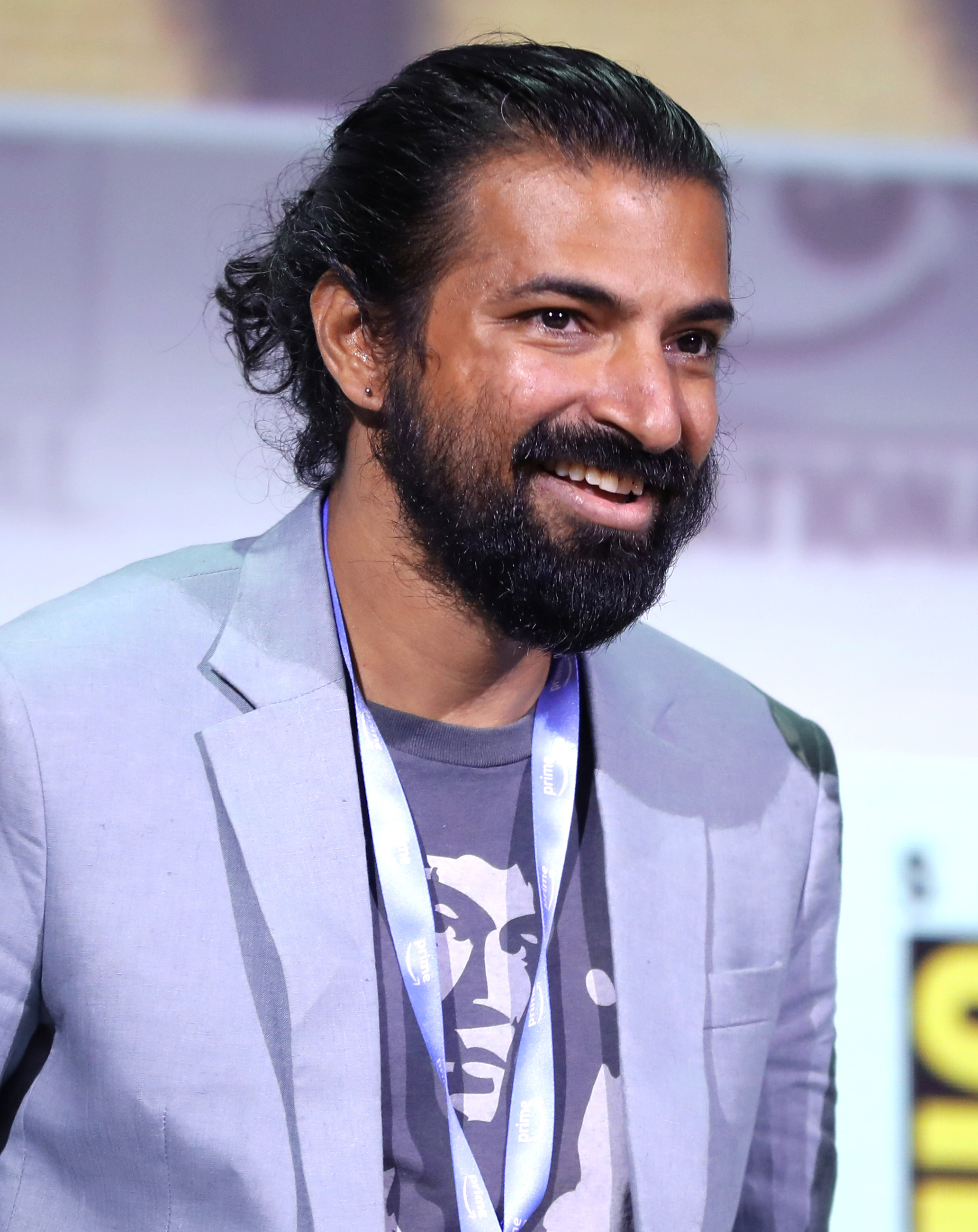
- Ashwin at San Diego Comic-Con in 2023
- Born: Singireddy Nag Ashwin Reddy; 23 April 1986 (age 40); India
- Education: Manipal Academy of Higher Education
- Occupations: Film director, screenwriter
- Years active: 2008–present
- Spouse: Priyanka Dutt (m. 2015)
- Children: 1
- Relatives: C. Aswani Dutt (father-in-law); Swapna Dutt (sister-in-law)

Singireddy Nag Ashwin Reddy (born 23 April 1986), popularly known as Nag Ashwin, is an Indian film director and screenwriter known for his work in Telugu cinema. He is a recipient of two National Film Awards, a Nandi Award, and a Filmfare Award. A graduate of the New York Film Academy, Ashwin began his career as an assistant director to Sekhar Kammula. He made his directorial debut in 2015 with the coming-of-age film Yevade Subramanyam, which earned him the Nandi Award for Best Debut Director.

He gained widespread acclaim for directing Mahanati (2018), a biopic of actress Savitri, which became the highest-grossing female-led South Indian film and won him the National Film Award for Best Feature Film in Telugu as well as the Filmfare Award for Best Director – Telugu. In 2024, Ashwin directed the dystopian science fiction film Kalki 2898 AD which won Best Production Design and Best Popular Feature Film at the 72nd National Film Awards.

== Early life ==
Nag Ashwin was born on 23 April 1986 in a Telugu family to Jayaram and Jayanthi Reddy, who are both doctors. He has a younger sister, Nikhila, who is also a doctor. His father hails from Aithole Village in Mahabubnagar (now Nagar Kurnool) district, Telangana. Ashwin's mother hails from Visakhapatnam and runs J. J. Hospital, along with his father, in Hyderabad.

Ashwin studied in The Hyderabad Public School, Begumpet, Hyderabad. He was classmates and friends with Rana Daggubati since class one. He earned his bachelor's degree in Mass Communication from Manipal Academy of Higher Education. He then did a film direction course at the New York Film Academy.

== Career ==
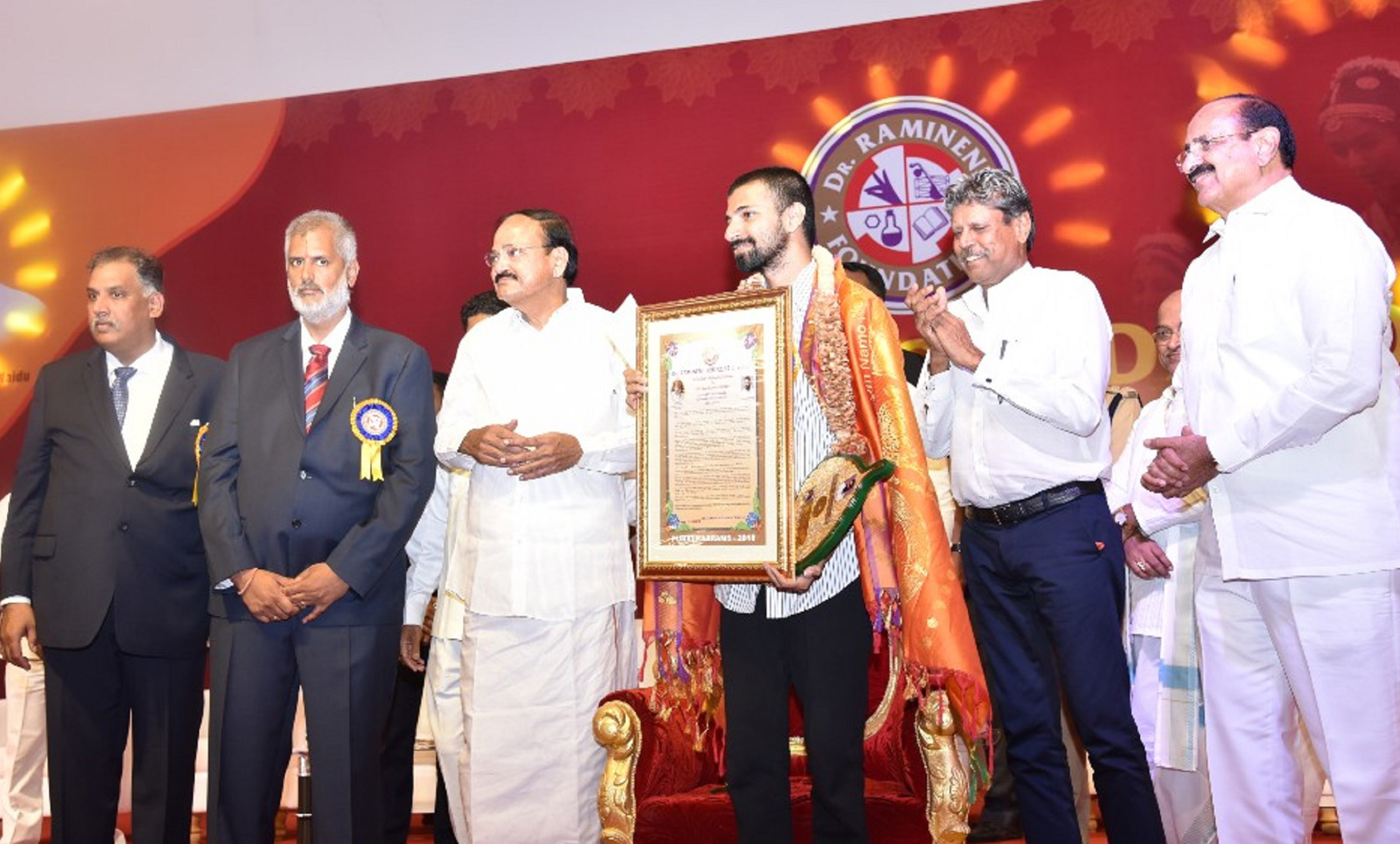
Ashwin (third from right) receiving an award from Venkaiah Naidu (third from left), the Vice President of India in 2018

Nag Ashwin began his career in the film industry as an assistant director, working on the 2008 film Nenu Meeku Telusa?. He later worked as assistant director to Sekhar Kammula in Leader (2010) and Life Is Beautiful (2012) and acted in minor roles in all three films.

Ashwin made his directorial debut with Yevade Subramanyam (2015), a film backed by Vyjayanthi Movies. The plot centers around Subramanyam (played by Nani), a corporate professional who embarks on a journey of self-discovery. The film also stars Malvika Nair, Vijay Deverakonda, and Ritu Varma. It was notable for its extensive filming at Everest Base Camps in Nepal, making it the first Indian film to be shot at that location. Released on 21 March 2015, Yevade Subramanyam received mostly positive reviews. Critics praised Nani's performance and the film's message-oriented script but criticized the slow-paced narration. The film was commercially successful.

In May 2016, Nag Ashwin announced his next film would be a biopic of the Indian actress Savitri, titled Mahanati. He spent six months researching her life, reading articles and books, and interviewing journalists and actors who knew her. Backed by Vyjayanthi Movies, principal photography began in May 2017 and concluded by March 2018. Mahanati was released on 9 May 2018 to critical and commercial acclaim, winning several awards. It was showcased in the Indian Panorama Mainstream section at the 49th International Film Festival of India and received the "Equality in Cinema Award" at the 2018 Indian Film Festival of Melbourne. At the 66th National Film Awards, it won Best Feature Film in Telugu, among other accolades. Nag Ashwin received the Filmfare Award for Best Director – Telugu at the 66th Filmfare Awards South.

In February 2020, Ashwin announced a science fiction action film to mark the 50th anniversary of Vyjayanthi Movies. Prabhas was announced as the lead actor, with the working title Project K. However, production was delayed by a year due to the COVID-19 pandemic. Filming began in July 2021 at Ramoji Film City, in Hyderabad, on a ₹600 crore budget, making it the most expensive Indian film to date. The cast includes Deepika Padukone, Amitabh Bachchan and Kamal Haasan. The film, later titled Kalki 2898 AD, was the first Indian film presented at San Diego Comic-Con's Hall H on 20 July 2023. Released worldwide on 27 June 2024, the film received positive reviews from critics and audiences. Collider praised the film as a "unique sci-fi epic" with strong performances by Prabhas and Bachchan and an impressive screenplay by Ashwin. Deadline Hollywood called it "terrific, cathartic fun" and anticipated more editions in the "Kalki Cinematic Universe," applauding Ashwin's work.

== Personal life ==
In December 2015, Nag Ashwin married Priyanka Dutt, the second daughter of producer C. Aswani Dutt of Vyjayanthi Movies. The couple has a son, Rishi.

== Filmography ==
Key
†	Denotes films that have not yet been released

Directed features
Year	Title	Notes	Ref.
2015	Yevade Subramanyam		
2018	Mahanati		
2024	Kalki 2898 AD		
TBA	Kalki 2898 AD: Part 2 †		

Other works
Year	Title	Credited as	Notes	Ref.
2008	Nenu Meeku Telusa?	Assistant director, actor	credited as Ashwin	
2010	Leader	Assistant director, actor	Special appearance	
2012	Life Is Beautiful	Assistant director, actor		
2021	Pitta Kathalu	Director, writer	Anthology film; Segment: xLife	
2021	Jathi Ratnalu	Producer		
2026	Sing Geetham	Producer		

=== Television ===
List of film credits as assistant director
Year	Title	Credit	Network	Ref.
2024	Bujji & Bhairava	Creator/Director	Amazon Prime Video	

== Awards and nominations ==
List of awards and nominations received by Nag Ashwin
Work	Awards	Category	Result	Ref.
Yevade Subramanyam	Nandi Awards	Best Debut Director	Won	
Yevade Subramanyam	5th SIIMA Awards	Best Director – Telugu	Nominated	
Mahanati	66th Filmfare Awards South	Best Director	Won	
Mahanati	66th National Film Awards	Best Feature Film – Telugu	Won	
Mahanati	8th SIIMA Awards	Best Director – Telugu	Nominated	
Mahanati	Zee Cine Awards Telugu	Best Director	Won	
Mahanati	Ramineni Foundation Awards	Best Director	Won	
Kalki 2898 AD	Telangana Gaddar Film Awards of 2024	Best Feature Film (Gold)	Won	
Kalki 2898 AD	Telangana Gaddar Film Awards of 2024	Best Director	Won	
Kalki 2898 AD	70th Filmfare Awards South	Best Director	Nominated	
Kalki 2898 AD	13th SIIMA Awards	Best Director – Telugu	Nominated	
Kalki 2898 AD	72nd National Film Awards	Best Popular Film Providing Wholesome Entertainment	Won	
