= Priyanka Dutt =

Indian film producer (born 1984)

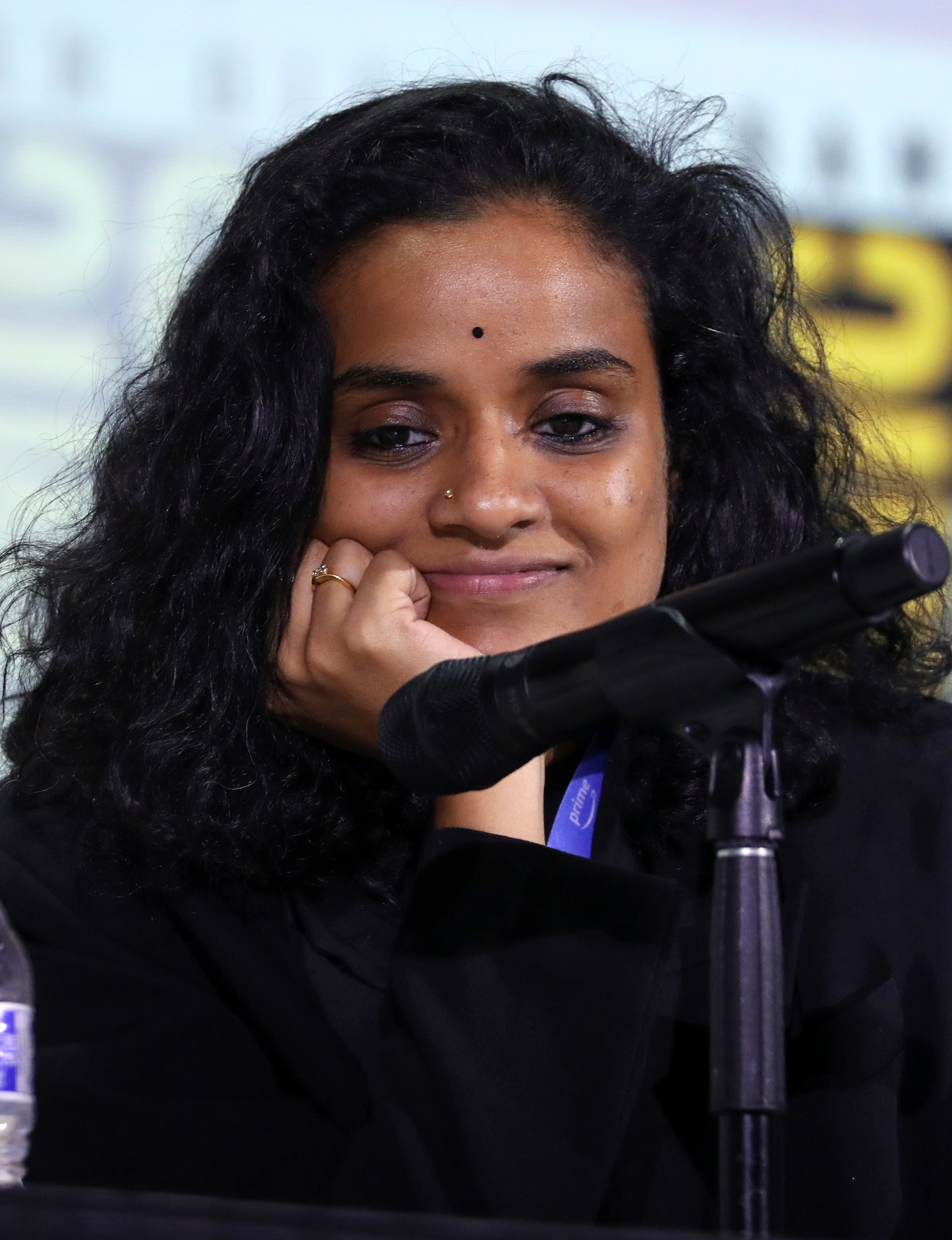
- Priyanka at San Diego Comic-Con in 2023
- Born: Chalasani Seshu Priyanka Dutt; 19 December 1984 (age 41); Vijayawada, Andhra Pradesh, India
- Occupation: Film producer
- Years active: 2004–present
- Organisation(s): Vyjayanthi Movies, Three Angels Studio
- Spouse: Nag Ashwin (m. 2015)
- Children: 1
- Parent: C. Aswani Dutt (Father)
- Relatives: Swapna Dutt, Sravanthi Dutt (Sisters)
- Awards: National Film Award for Best Feature Film in Telugu - Mahanati (2018)

Chalasani Seshu Priyanka Dutt (born 19 December 1984) is an Indian film producer known for her work in Telugu cinema. She is the daughter of C. Ashwini Dutt, a well known Indian film producer and the founder of Vyjayanthi Movies.

Dutt studied filmmaking at University of California, Los Angeles. She made her debut as a filmmaker at the age of 20 by co-producing the film Balu in 2004. She is also the founder of Three Angels Studio and has produced a short film titled Yaadon Ki Baraat, which was screened at the 2013 Cannes Film Festival.

== Early life ==
Dutt began her career in the film industry by assisting Bombay-based director and advertisement filmmaker Shoojit Sircar in many of his advertisements for various brands. She moved to Hyderabad to co-produce movies with her father's banner Vyjayanthi Movies. She co-produced three films: Balu (2005), Jai Chiranjeeva (2005), and Shakti (2011).

== Three Angels Studio ==
Dutt launched her own production house, Three Angels Studio in the year 2009 to encourage New age cinema. The studio produced its first film Baanam (2009) which explores the story of an IPS officer who is the son of a Naxalite. The film was critically acclaimed for the way it dealt with the issue. The film won Priyanka the Silver Nandi Award in the best film category in 2009. She also produced corporate films for premium clients in India under Three Angels Studio.

== Personal life ==
In December 2015, Dutt married Nag Ashwin, the director of Yevade Subramanyam (2015), which she had produced along with her sister, Swapna Dutt. The couple has a son, Rishi.

== Filmography ==
| Year | Film | Role | Production |
|---|---|---|---|
| 2005 | Balu | Associate producer | Vyjayanthi Movies |
| 2005 | Jai Chiranjeeva | Line producer | Vyjayanthi Movies |
| 2009 | Baanam | Producer | Three Angels Studio |
| 2010 | Om Shanti | Producer | Three Angels Studio |
| 2011 | Shakti | Creative producer | Vyjayanthi Movies |
| 2012 | Sarocharu | Producer | Three Angels Studio |
| 2015 | Yevade Subramanyam | Producer | Swapna Cinema |
| 2018 | Mahanati | Producer | Vyjayanthi Movies |
| 2021 | Mail | Producer | Swapna Cinema |
| 2023 | Anni Manchi Sakunamule | Producer | Swapna Cinema |
| 2024 | Kalki 2898 AD | Co-producer | Vyjayanthi Movies |
| 2025 | Champion | Producer | Swapna Cinema |

=== Television ===
| Year | Title | Role | Network |
|---|---|---|---|
| 2023 | Kumari Srimathi | Producer | Amazon Prime Video |
