= Vyjayanthi Movies =

Indian entertainment company

- Type: Private
- Industry: Entertainment
- Founded: 1972; 54 years ago
- Headquarters: Hyderabad, India
- Key people: C. Aswini Dutt; Swapna Dutt; Priyanka Dutt
- Products: Films
- Subsidiaries: Swapna Cinema; Three Angels Studio

Vyjayanthi Movies is an Indian film production company founded in 1972 by C. Aswini Dutt. One of the leading production houses in Telugu cinema, it is known for its large-scale productions featuring high production values and top-tier actors. The company has produced several acclaimed and commercially successful films over the decades. Its 2024 production, Kalki 2898 AD, is the most expensive Indian film ever made and ranks among the highest-grossing Indian films of all time.

Vyjayanthi Movies' subsidiaries, Swapna Cinema and Three Angels Studio, are managed by Aswani Dutt's daughters, Swapna Dutt and Priyanka Dutt.

== History ==
=== Establishment ===
Original Logo of Vyjayanthi Movies

Aswini Dutt began his film career as an executive producer for a black-and-white film directed by K. Viswanath. Aspiring to produce a film with his favourite actor, N. T. Rama Rao, he approached him with the idea. Rama Rao named the company Vyjayanthi Movies, which was founded under Dutt's proprietorship and debuted with the successful Eduruleni Manishi (1975). The company's logo features Rama Rao as Lord Krishna, holding a sankha, with the Earth behind him.

=== Major productions and collaborations ===
Vyjayanthi Movies established itself as a leading production house by consistently working with the top actors of Telugu cinema, including N. T. Rama Rao, Akkineni Nageswara Rao, Krishna, Sobhan Babu, Krishnam Raju, Chiranjeevi, and Nagarjuna. Many of its films were directed by directors such as K. Bapayya and K. Raghavendra Rao.

Over the years, the company produced several box-office successes, including Agni Parvatam (1985), Jagadeka Veerudu Athiloka Sundari (1990), and Indra (2002). Vyjayanthi Movies also introduced popular actors, such as Mahesh Babu, Allu Arjun, Jr. NTR, Ram Charan, and Nara Rohit.

The production house enjoyed a long run of success until it faced challenges with the film Jr. NTR-starrer Sakthi in 2011, prompting Aswini Dutt to take a seven-year hiatus. He made a notable comeback with Mahanati in 2018, which went on to become one of the highest-grossing films of the year.

== Subsidiaries ==
=== Swapna Cinema ===
In 2014, Aswini Dutt's elder daughter, Swapna Dutt, inherited Swapna Cinema from her father. Under this banner, Swapna and her sister, Priyanka Dutt produced Yevade Subramanyam. This was a big success story at the box office in 2015. In 2018, this banner produced a biopic on the late actress, Savitri. The biopic, titled Mahanati stars Keerthi Suresh, Dulquer Salmaan, Samantha Ruth Prabhu, and Vijay Devarakonda. It was critically acclaimed and highly successful at the box office.

=== Three Angels Studio ===
Aswini Dutt's younger daughter, Priyanka Dutt launched a new production house named Three Angels Studio in 2008. She produced her first film, Baanam (2009), through this company and introduced Nara Rohit to Telugu Cinema. The film was critically acclaimed, but did not do well at the box office. She then produced the anthology film Om Shanti in 2010. It stars Nikhil Siddhartha, Kajal Aggarwal, Bindu Madhavi and Navdeep.

=== Early Monsoon Tales ===
Swapna Dutt and Priyanka Dutt ventured into web series with the Nithya Menen starrer Kumari Srimathi (2023). The series that premiered on Amazon Prime has garnered positive reviews with a 7.2 rating on IMDb.

== Shelved projects ==
=== Chiranjeevi – Singeetam Srinivasa Rao Project ===
Following the success of Jagadeka Veerudu Athiloka Sundari (1990), Aswini Dutt aimed to produce another fantasy film, this time with an emphasis on CGI. The project, titled Bhooloka Veerudu, was launched with Chiranjeevi in the lead role and Singeetam Srinivasa Rao as the director. After completing two schedules, the team realised that they lacked a strong storyline, leading to the film being shelved.

=== Chiranjeevi – Ram Gopal Varma Project ===
Ram Gopal Varma narrated a story to Aswini Dutt which he liked. Varma was making Daud at that time and felt that the shooting of Daud might be stalled due to Sanjay Dutt's legal issues. So Varma narrated the story to Aswini Dutt and Chiranjeevi which they liked. Aswini Dutt started the project with Chiranjeevi as the lead in the direction of Ram Gopal Varma. After Sanjay Dutt's release, the shooting of Daud resumed. Then Aswini Dutt realised that the storylines for these two films are similar. As he was not comfortable in doing a film which had the same storyline to another film, he stalled the project.

== Film production ==
Key
†	Denotes films that have not yet been released

=== Vyjayanti Movies ===
Year	Title	Notes
1975	Eduruleni Manishi	
1978	Yuga Purushudu	
1981	Guru Sishyulu	
1983	Adavi Simhalu	
1985	Agni Parvatam	
1986	Brahma Rudrulu	
1988	Aakhari Poratam	
1990	Jagadeka Veerudu Atiloka Sundari	
1992	Aswamedham	
1994	Govinda Govinda	
1998	Choodalani Vundi	
1999	Rajakumarudu	
1999	Ravoyi Chandamama	
2000	Azad	
2001	Premakke Sai	Kannada film
2002	Company	Hindi film
2002	Indra	
2005	Balu ABCDEFG	
2005	Subhash Chandra Bose	
2005	Jai Chiranjeeva	
2006	Sainikudu	
2007	Chirutha	
2008	Kantri	
2008	Kathanayakudu	
2011	Shakthi	
2018	Devadas	
2019	Maharshi	Co-produced with Dil Raju and Prasad V. Potluri
2022	Sita Ramam	
2024	Kalki 2898 AD	Co-produced by Swapna Dutt and Priyanka Dutt

=== Swapna Cinema ===
Year	Title	Notes
2001	Student No.1	
2002	Okato Number Kurraadu	
2015	Yevade Subramanyam	
2018	Mahanati	
2021	Mail	
2021	Jathi Ratnalu	
2022	Sita Ramam	
2023	Anni Manchi Sakunamule	
2026	Sing Geetham	
2026	Aakasamlo Oka Tara †	

=== Three Angels Studio ===
Year	Title	Language	Notes
2009	Baanam	Telugu	
2010	Om Shanti	Telugu	
2012	Sarocharu	Telugu	

=== Early Monsoon Tales ===
Year	Title	Language	Notes
2023	Kumari Srimathi	Telugu	Web Series Streaming on Amazon Prime

=== Sri Raghavendra Movie Corporation and United Producers ===
(Aswini Dutt, Allu Aravind, and K. Raghavendra Rao)

Year	Title	Language	Notes
1996	Pelli Sandadi	Telugu	
1997	Mere Sapno Ki Rani	Hindi	
1998	Paradesi	Telugu	
1998	Ninaithen Vandhai	Tamil	
2003	Gangotri	Telugu	

=== Siri Media Arts ===
(Aswini Dutt and Allu Aravind)

Year	Title	Language	Notes
2003	Pellam Oorelithe	Telugu	
2003	Calcutta Mail	Hindi	Remake of Choodalani Vundi
2004	Intlo Srimathi Veedhilo Kumari	Telugu	

=== Sri Priyanka Pictures ===
Year	Title	Language	Notes
1994	Subhalagnam	Telugu	

=== Roja Art Productions ===
Year	Title	Language	Notes
1983	Jaani Dost	Hindi	

=== Sri Sai Raghavendra Movies ===
(Aswini Dutt and K. Raghavendra Rao)

Year	Title	Language	Notes
2000	Pelli Sambandham	Telugu	

== Television production ==
=== Vyjayanthi Television ===
Year	Title	Network
2025	Jayammu Nischayammu Raa with Jagapathi	ZEE5; Zee Telugu
