= Mahanati =

2018 Indian film by Nag Ashwin

- Theatrical release poster
- Directed by: Nag Ashwin
- Written by: Nag Ashwin; Sai Madhav Burra (dialogues); Padmavathi Malladi (additional screenplay and dialogues)
- Produced by: Priyanka Dutt
- Starring: Keerthy Suresh; Dulquer Salmaan; Samantha Ruth Prabhu; Vijay Deverakonda
- Cinematography: Dani Sanchez-Lopez
- Edited by: Kotagiri Venkateswara Rao
- Music by: Mickey J. Meyer
- Production companies: Vyjayanthi Movies; Swapna Cinema
- Release date: 9 May 2018
- Running time: 177 minutes
- Country: India
- Language: Telugu
- Budget: ₹25 crore
- Box office: ₹85–90 crore

Mahanati (transl. The great actress) is a 2018 Indian Telugu-language biographical drama film based on the life of actress Savitri. It is written and directed by Nag Ashwin, and produced by Priyanka Dutt under Vyjayanthi Movies and Swapna Cinema. The film features Keerthy Suresh as Savitri while Dulquer Salmaan (in his Telugu debut) plays Savitri's husband Gemini Ganesan. The film also stars Samantha Ruth Prabhu and Vijay Deverakonda, while Rajendra Prasad, Bhanupriya, Divyavani, Mohan Babu, Naga Chaitanya and Prakash Raj appear in supporting roles. The plot follows Savitri's life, depicting her turbulent rise to prominence, marriage with Ganesan, and subsequent fall from grace, which is viewed from the perspective of a journalist and a photographer, played by Samantha and Deverakonda respectively.

Ashwin began working on the biopic of Savitri following the release of his directorial debut Yevade Subramanyam (2015). Its principal photography began in May 2017 and ended in March 2018 with filming taking place in Hyderabad, Palakollu, Bangalore, Chennai, Mysore, and Delhi. Dani Sanchez-Lopez performed the cinematography while Kotagiri Venkateswara Rao edited the film. The film features the score and soundtrack composed by Mickey J. Meyer. Mahanati released theatrically on 9 May 2018 while dubbed versions in Tamil and Malayalam were released on 11 May 2018 with the titles Nadigaiyar Thilagam and Mahanadi, respectively.

Mahanati received positive reviews for Keerthy's performance as Savitri and mixed reviews for Ashwin's screenplay and direction. The film won three awards at the 66th National Film Awards, namely, Best Feature Film in Telugu, Best Actress for Keerthy and Best Costume Design. The film also won four Filmfare Awards South including Best Film and Best Actress in Telugu category. Mahanati was screened at the International Film Festival of India, the Shanghai International Film Festival, and the Indian Film Festival of Melbourne. It also fetched the state Telangana Gaddar Film Award for Best Feature Film. The film was the highest-grossing female-led South Indian and Telugu film, until it was surpassed by Lokah Chapter 1: Chandra (2025) and Maa Inti Bangaaram (2026) in the respective records.

== Plot ==
In 1980 Bangalore, celebrated actress Savitri is discovered unconscious by her son and hospitalized, slipping into a prolonged coma. The incident draws intense media attention, though her personal circumstances remains an enigma to the public. Madhuravani, a newspaper journalist struggling with a stutter, and Vijay Anthony, a photojournalist, are assigned to cover her story. During her investigation, Madhuravani uncovers a poignant letter written by Savitri expressing a final wish to take her son to meet someone named "Shankarayya." Although her editor eventually cancels the memoir assignment, an intrigued Madhuravani continues her research independently. She sneaks into Savitri's abandoned residence and overhears her maternal aunt recounting details of the actress's turbulent upbringing.

In 1942 Vijayawada, a widowed Subadramma and her young daughter, Savitri, are taken in by Subadramma's sister, Durgamba, and her husband, K. V. Chowdary, much to Chowdary's displeasure. Savitri grows into a gifted dancer, performing in local plays alongside her childhood friend Susheela under Chowdary's strict management. As cinema eclipses live theater and causes significant financial losses, Chowdary attempts to push Savitri into the film industry in Madras. Initially rejected due to her young age and lack of fluency in Tamil, she crosses paths with Ramasamy "Gemini" Ganesan, a charismatic studio employee who facilitates her first professional casting photograph. Savitri eventually secures a role in L. V. Prasad's Samsaram (1950), but is dismissed after becoming starstruck by leading actor Akkineni Nageswara Rao, requiring numerous takes. Undeterred, she secures a minor part in Pathala Bhairavi, initiating her rapid cinematic ascent.

Savitri is subsequently cast as the lead opposite Ganesan, who personally coaches her in Tamil. The two become massive stars and fall deeply in love, despite Ganesan already being married. Their secret marriage sparks a bitter familial fallout, leading Chowdary to publicly disown her. Though Savitri initially intends to retire, Ganesan and legendary producer Aluri Chakrapani convince her to continue acting. Her performance in Mayabazar catapults her to unprecedented stardom, earning her widespread acclaim. The couple later welcomes two children, a daughter and a son. However, as Savitri's fame and financial earnings begin to eclipse Ganesan's, his growing professional jealousy drives him to severe alcoholism. In a misguided attempt to curb his habit and keep him company, Savitri begins drinking alongside him.

In 1968, Savitri directs Chinnari Papalu, a groundbreaking film featuring an all-female crew. On the day of its release, she discovers Ganesan with another woman, prompting an immediate separation. Deprived of his emotional support, Savitri struggles with escalating alcoholism and weight gain. Her vulnerability is exploited by fraudulent associates, leading to a massive Income tax raid that decimates her wealth. Following her mother's death and a heated altercation with her estranged daughter over her drinking, an accidental fire breaks out in her mansion, during which Savitri faints and is later diagnosed with severe diabetes.

A frail Chowdary visits Savitri on his deathbed, facilitating an emotional reconciliation between Savitri, her daughter, and her uncle. Resolved to reform, Savitri stops drinking, loses weight, moves to a modest home with her son, and takes low-budget acting roles to systematically clear her debts. She even sets aside an untouchable fund to construct a rehabilitation center. Facing additional tax penalties, she refuses to surrender the center's funds. She travels to Bangalore with her son, where, overwhelmed by isolation and financial desperation, she attempts to phone Ganesan, but hangs up in tears before speaking. Succumbing to despair, she drinks heavily in her hotel room and collapses into her terminal coma.

Concurrently, Madhuravani's immersion into Savitri's life inspires her to find her own voice. Realizing her love for Anthony, she courageously disrupts what she believes to be his engagement ceremony, speaking fluently without her stutter for the first time, only to learn it is actually his sister's wedding. Anthony happily reciprocates her feelings. Madhuravani publishes her definitive biography of Savitri, honoring her legacy. She visits the comatose actress, placing in her hand a rare childhood photograph of Savitri's biological father, whom she had spent her life yearning to know. Savitri passes away in December 1981. The framing narrative concludes by revealing that "Shankarayya" was not a person, but a roadside statue that a fatherless, young Savitri had affectionately adopted as her father.

== Cast ==
- Keerthy Suresh as Savitri
- Dulquer Salmaan as Gemini Ganesan
- Samantha Ruth Prabhu as Madhuravani
- Vijay Deverakonda as Vijay Anthony, Madhuravani's love interest
- Rajendra Prasad as Kommareddy Venkataramaiah Chowdary, Savitri's uncle
- Bhanupriya as Durgamba, Savitri's aunt
- Divyavani as Subadramma, Savitri's mother
- Mohan Babu as S. V. Ranga Rao
- Prakash Raj as Aluri Chakrapani
- Srinivas Avasarala as L. V. Prasad
- Naga Chaitanya as Akkineni Nageswara Rao
- Manobala as P. Pullaiah
- Malavika Nair as Alamelu, Ganesan's first wife
- Shalini Pandey as Suseela, Savitri's friend
- Krish as K. V. Reddy
- Tharun Bhascker as Singeetham Srinivasa Rao
- Sai Tejaswini as child Savitri
- Chaitra as child Suseela
- Suresh as Dance Master
- Ram Charan as child Satish
- Jayanthi Reddy as Aayyama
- Tulasi as Madhuravani's mother
- Murali Krishna as Madhuravani's father
- Ramadevi as Madhuravani's grandmother
- Sandeep Vanga as Vedantam Raghavayya
- Tanikella Bharani as the editor of Prajavani
- Mohan Bhagath as Journalist Shekar
- Naresh as Cameraman Kesava
- Karthik Rathnam as Dancer
- Vamsee Chaganti as JJ Krishnamurthy
- Bindu Chandramouli as Pushpavalli
- Mahesh Achanta as Sattya
- Sai Madhav Burra as Pingali
- Dani Sanchez-Lopez as Lux ad photographer

== Production ==
=== Development ===
In May 2016, director Nag Ashwin, who made his debut with Yevade Subramanyam (2015), announced that his next film would be a biopic of the Indian actress Savitri, who was active during the 1950s and 60s, predominantly in Telugu and Tamil films. The film was titled Mahanati, and Ashwin had finished the script work and began casting actors for the project. He spent six months researching the actress by reading articles and books, in addition to meeting old journalists and actors associated with her. In an interview with Indo-Asian News Service, Ashwin talked about his intention to adapt Savitri's life into a film. "From a penniless origin to the first female superstar, her life is quite a story," he stated. Ashwin felt that the time had come to revisit the "legends" and understand why they were legends." In another interview to India Today, Ashwin told that choosing to make Mahanati was more of a subconscious decision, as he grew up watching her films and songs.

The film's production is handled by Ashwin's wife Priyanka Dutt and her sister Swapna Dutt. They are the daughters of veteran film producer Ashwini Dutt, the founder of Vyjayanthi Movies. The film was originally intended to be shot simultaneously in Telugu and Tamil languages, however, the Tamil version was later dropped in favour of a dub. (Note: The CBFC certificate of the Tamil version Nadigaiyar Thilagam indicates that it is a dubbed version of Mahanati.)

=== Cast and crew ===
In August 2016, Ashwin announced his intention to cast the lead actress with an audience poll. In December, Nithya Menen entered the talks to play Savitri but it did not materialise. Subsequently, Keerthy Suresh was signed for the role in early January 2017. Post the film's release in May 2018, Ashwin in a video interview with Indiaglitz Tamil, stated that Anushka Shetty and Vidya Balan were his first choices to play the role of Savitri. However he was convinced that Keerthy was the right choice after watching her in Thodari (2016). Keerthy was initially apprehensive to play Savitri but her mother, who is a fan of Savitri's work prompted her to take up the role. While preparing for the character, she watched Savitri's films, read her biography A Legendary Actress: Mahanati Savitri, and consulted her daughter Vijaya Chamundeswari to know about her personality.

Samantha Akkineni was confirmed to be a part of the project who would be portraying Madhuravani, a journalist from whose perspective the story is narrated. For the role of Savitri's husband Gemini Ganesan, Ashwin has considered Suriya and Madhavan, before finalising Dulquer Salmaan for the character. The film marked Salmaan's debut in Telugu cinema. Vijay Deverakonda, who had earlier been considered for Ganesan's role, was selected to pair opposite Samantha as Vijay Antony. Ashwin told Indo-Asian News Service that Salmaan's portrayal of Ganesan would go beyond the physical resemblance, to better depict the character's emotional side.

The cast also includes Rajendra Prasad who plays Savitri's uncle KV Chowdary and Bhanupriya who plays Savitri's aunt. Shalini Pandey plays Suseela, Savitri's friend. Naga Chaitanya plays his grandfather Akkineni Nageswara Rao while Mohan Babu plays S. V. Ranga Rao. Other appearances include Prakash Raj as Aluri Chakrapani, Krish as K. V. Reddy, and Srinivas Avasarala as L. V. Prasad among others. Sai Madhav Burra who gave the dialogue for the film, makes a cameo appearance as writer Pingali. N. T. Rama Rao Jr. was offered to play his grandfather N. T. Rama Rao but he declined, saying that he would not be able to do justice for that role.

Mickey J Meyer and Dani Sanchez-Lopez were confirmed as music composer and cinematographer respectively.

=== Filming ===
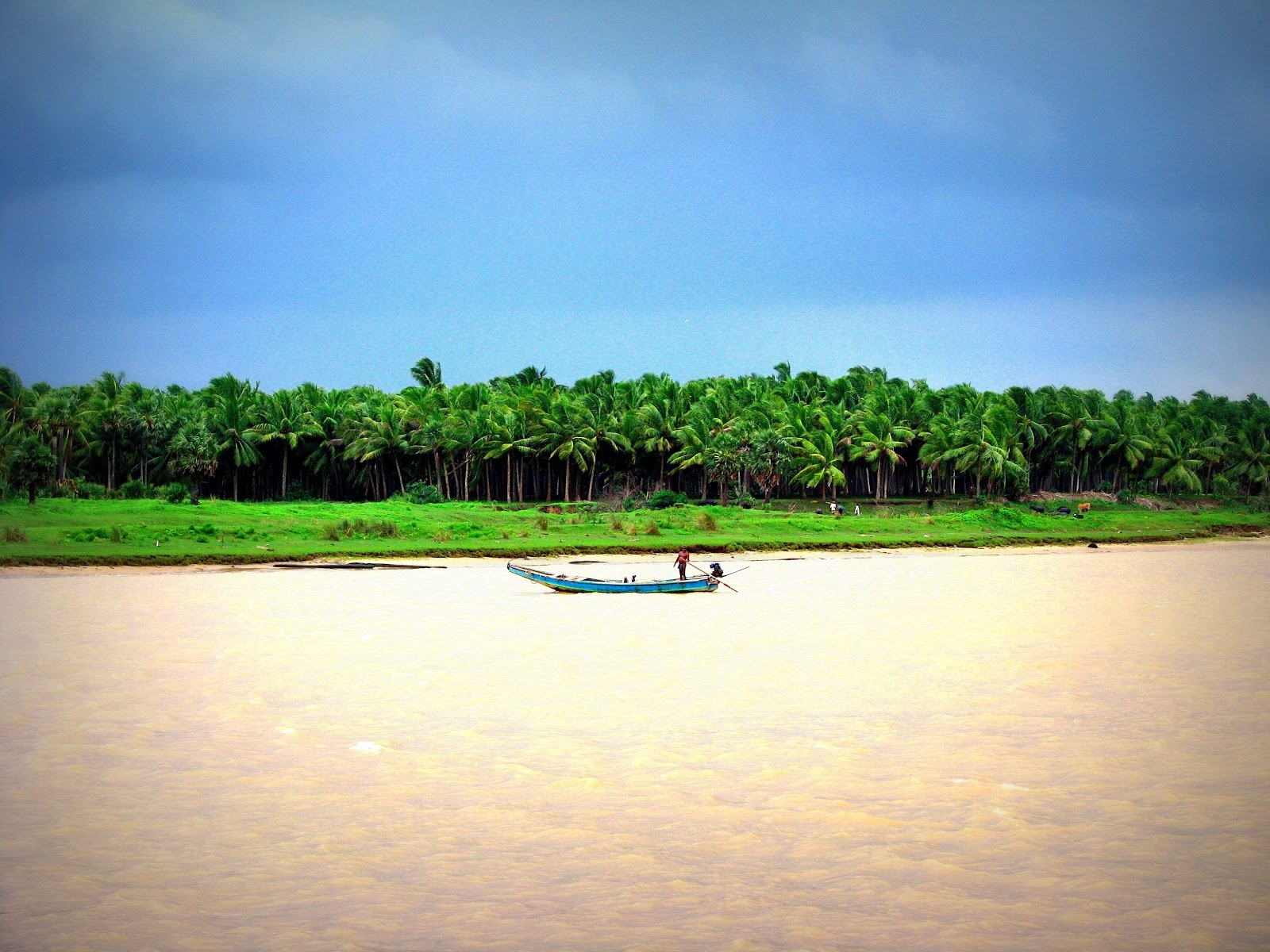
Palakollu where the scenes related to Savitri's childhood were shot.

Principal photography began on 29 May 2017 in Hyderabad and ended on 22 March 2018. Filming also took place in Palakollu of West Godavari district to picturise Savitri's childhood, in addition to Bangalore, Chennai, Mysore, and Delhi. The song "Aha Na Peliyanta" from Mayabazar (1957) was shot as a part of the first schedule and a 25-day long second schedule took place in June. Singeetam Srinivasa Rao who worked as an assistant director for Mayabazar visited the sets when they were shooting scenes related to that film. Keerthy gained some weight to play crucial scenes featuring Savitri after her childbirth.

Madhuravani's storyline which takes place in the 1980s was shot on film stock, using a super 16mm camera to achieve a grainy texture. Cinematographer Sanchez-Lopez explained that the decision was consciously made to match the Technicolor format used in the Indian films of that period. Salmaan shot his portions by January 2018. He completed his dubbing later in March, followed by Akkineni and Keerthy in April.

The production team is said to have put extensive effort into Savitri's costumes and jewellery. To give a vintage look for the jewellery, designer Naveen Sangli used old methods such as gold wire wrapping and dainty stone setting. Sangli worked with Ashwin and the costume designer Gaurang Shah to get the right match between the saris and jewellery. Shah revealed that they did months of research for costumes. He along with a team of 100 artisans worked over a year to make them.

== Music ==
The film's score and soundtrack album are composed by Mickey J. Meyer. The album consists of five songs with lyrics written by Sirivennela Sitaramasastri and Ramajogayya Sastry. The full album of Mahanati was released on 1 May 2018 at a launch event, featuring the entire cast and crew. A sixth single "Gelupuleni Samaram" that was not part of the album was released later. Mridula Ramagudu of Firstpost called the album Meyer's best work to date.

== Themes and influences ==
The film's structure broadly follows that of Orson Welles' Citizen Kane (1941), where a reporter sets out to find the story of an elderly protagonist. The mystery of 'Rosebud' in Citizen Kane is comparable to 'Shankarayya' in Mahanati. While the film is based on Savitri's life, Madhuravani, the journalist played by Ruth Prabhu, is fictional. It is reported that the character was inspired by Sivasankari, a journalist and writer of Ananda Vikatan magazine who published an article about Savitri's ill-health and financial position similar to Madhuravani. Madhuravani is named after Savitri's character in Kanyasulkam (1955). Cinema Express' Aditya Shrikrishna noted that the inter-religious romance between Madhuravani and Antony is similar to the one depicted in the Savitri-starrer Missamma (1955). The scene in which Ganesan takes Savithri's hand on her terrace while her fans below are watching for her is an ode to Mani Ratnam's Iruvar (1997).

In an interview with The Hindu, Sanchez-Lopez talked about the choice of colour palettes in the film. The colours represent the tone and mood of the film as it explores Savitri's life. The use of mirrors in the film also serves as visual metaphors to her life.

Shrikrishna of Cinema Express stated that the film is not just a biopic but a "visual retelling of the history of South Indian cinema", adding, "Ashwin, in crafting this love letter to Savithri, encloses a post-script to cinema of a bygone era and the people at the centre of that early movement." The film also touches upon the movement for the statehood of Andhra Pradesh which took place in that period.

== Release ==
Mahanati was initially slated to release worldwide on 29 March 2018. Owing to delays in post-production and CG work, it was postponed to May. The film was released on 9 May 2018, while its dubbed versions in Tamil and Malayalam languages were released on 11 May 2018, the former titled Nadigaiyar Thilagam (transl. The pride of actresses).

The overseas distribution rights of Mahanati were acquired by Nirvana Cinemas, reportedly at an amount of ₹45 million. N. Chandrababu Naidu, the then chief minister of Andhra Pradesh, was impressed with the film and offered to exempt Mahanati from taxes in Andhra Pradesh, but the studio owner Ashwini Dutt politely declined it. From the third week, makers announced that the film would be screened at the old age homes.

After the film's release, Ganesan's first daughter Kamala Selvaraj alleged that Ganesan's characterisation was distorted and the film was biased in favour of Savitri. Ashwin responded by stating that Selvaraj was made aware of the plot during its development. Savitri's daughter Vijaya Chamundeswari also defended the film, suggesting that Selvaraj may have watched the film from a different perspective.

=== Home media ===
The film's digital rights were acquired by Amazon Prime Video. The television broadcast rights of Mahanati were acquired by Star Maa; its premiere on television registered a target rating point (TRP) rating of 20.16. A deleted scene from the film was released on 30 May 2018. The scene recreated the song "Vaarayo Vennilave" from the Tamil film Missiamma (1955). The film was also dubbed in Hindi produced by Swapna Cinema and released by Goldmines Telefilms on YouTube on 14 October 2021.

== Reception ==
=== Box office ===
Mahanati became the highest-grossing South Indian film that starred a woman as the primary character, surpassing Anushka Shetty's Rudramadevi (2015). The film was made on a budget of ₹25 crore and grossed ₹83 crore by the end of its theatrical run.

The film became the fourth-best Telugu opener in the United States in 2018, grossing over US$500,000.It completed its 50-day theatrical run with a gross of ₹83 crore. With over US$2.5 million (₹17.4 crore), Mahanati stood as the sixth-highest grossing Telugu film in the United States. After almost seven years of its release, Hindustan Times reported the worldwide gross to be ₹85 crore, whereas Filmfare reported ₹90 crore.

=== Critical reception ===
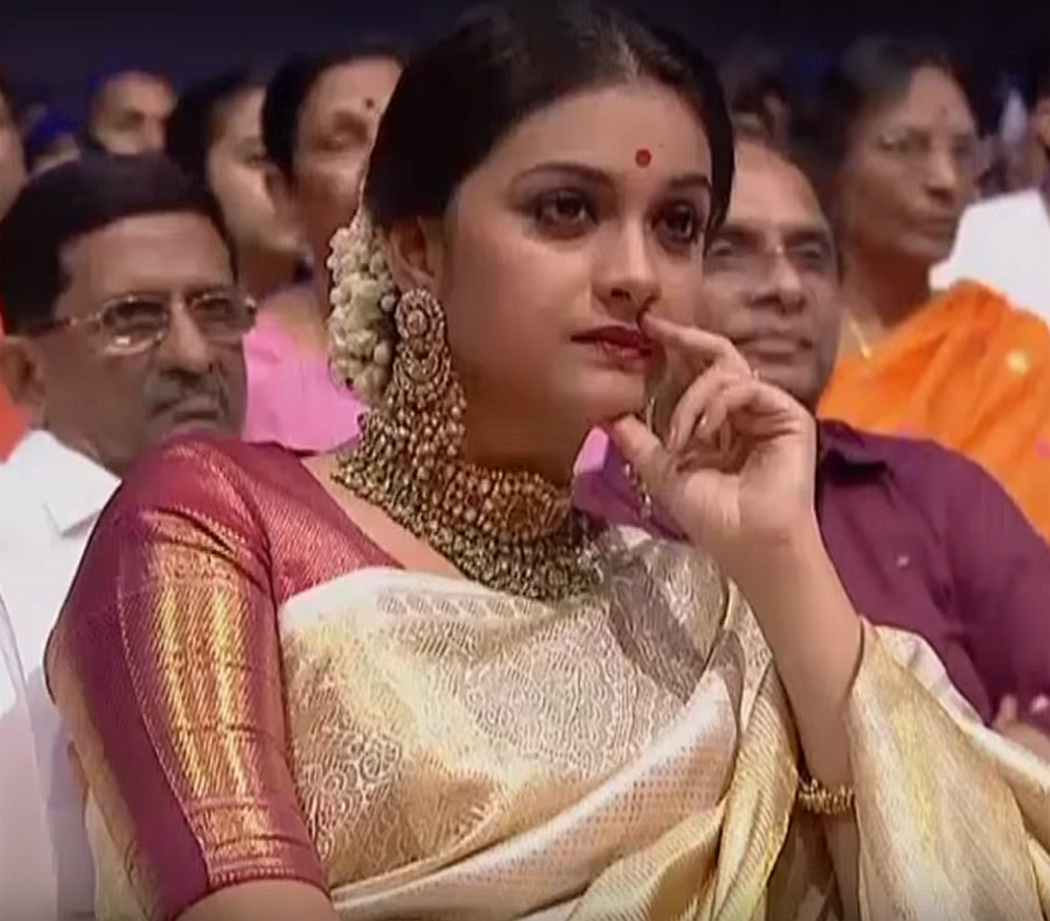
Keerthy received critical acclaim for her performance as Savitri and went on to win the National Film Award for Best Actress.

On the review aggregator website Rotten Tomatoes, the film has a score of 100% based on six reviews, with an average rating of 7.5/10.

Writing for The Times of India, Neeshita Nyayapati gave the film four stars out of five and commented, "To call Mahanati a celebration of Savitri's life would be an understatement, because the film breathes her life in a span of almost 3 hours." A review carried by Sify opined that Ashwin narrated the story in an emotional and poignant manner. They found Keerthy's portrayal of Savitri "pitch perfect" and felt Salmaan gave his "best performance." Sub-editor of India Today, Janani K called Mahanati "one of the best biopics of all time."

The Indian Express critic Manoj Kumar R gave the film four stars out of five and praised the performances. He called Salmaan, Keerthy, Akkineni, and the costume designers as the four best things to happen to the film. "These three actors are in top form and equally shoulder this film," Kumar stated. Priyanka Sundar of Hindustan Times applauded Salmaan's performance and wrote, "whether it is a frustrated and rude Ganesan when Savitri succumbs to coma or his cheesy Romeo avatar wooing Savitri [...] Dulquer has nailed it." Sangeetha Devi Dundoo of The Hindu said that the film belonged to Keerthy and Salmaan. "[T]hey imbibe the mannerisms of the legendary actors they're portraying but don't end up as caricatures," she wrote.

Suresh Kavirayani of Deccan Chronicle gave a positive review and praised the aspects of production and writing. He wrote: "The director has also successfully captured the essence of Gemini Ganeshan and Savitri's romance. He takes the audience on an emotional journey along with the actress." Krishna Sripada of The News Minute felt that Ashwin had pulled off a stunner by making Savitri's story a "once-in-a-lifetime epic." He said that the film would make the audience "smile through the tears". A review from The Free Press Journal gave 4 stars stated the performances are "compelling." "Director Nag Ashwin demonstrates a surprising level of maturity in apportioning flamboyance to the real-life tale," the reviewer wrote. Rahul Devalapalli of The Week observed that Keerthy shared a striking resemblance with Savitri. "In some of the scenes, shot in black and white, it is tough to tell if it is Savitri or Keerthy," Devulapalli added.

In his review for Firstpost, Hemnath Kumar gave Mahanati three stars out of five; he felt that the film does not have enough drama and wrote, "It is like reading a Wikipedia page of a famous person. You might get all that you are looking for but it is not the same as reading an in-depth book about the same person". Mathrubhumi's Akshara K. V. who also gave the film three stars out of five opined that the film's runtime could have been shorter as the latter half of the film lagged. Writing for Film Companion, Baradwaj Rangan said, "Mahanati, despite its numerous failings, cannot be easily dismissed – because it remembers a forgotten era, whose clips are lovingly recreated via scratchy prints and computerised colour". Among the overseas reviewers, Mythily Ramachandran in her review for Gulf News wrote that "Suresh completely owns her character and delivers a powerful performance. Dulquer Salmaan as Gemini Ganesan plays the perfect tango. Samantha, Vijay Devarkonda and Rajendra Prasad in supporting roles are brilliant." She also appreciated Meyer's "melodious compositions" and Sanchez-Lopez's frames that "juggle between sepia tones and colour."

== Legacy ==
The first look poster that featured Keerthy as Savitri was parodied in the promotional poster of Tamizh Padam 2 (2018). In August 2018, an art series titled The Mahanati Retrospective was showcased at the Telugu Film Chamber, Hyderabad. It was as a tribute to the actress Savitri which portrayed her in various phases of her life. A sum of ₹300,000 was raised from the exhibition and was donated to the victims of 2018 Kerala floods.

Film Companion listed Mahanati among the "25 Greatest Telugu Films of the Decade" while Keerthy's portrayal of Savitri was featured in their "100 Greatest Performances of the Decade." Mahanati's success spurred a series of biopics in the Telugu film industry. These include Yatra, NTR film series (Kathanayakudu and Mahanayakudu), and Lakshmi's NTR, which released in 2019.

== Accolades ==
At the 66th National Film Awards, Mahanati won three awards, Best Feature Film in Telugu, Best Actress (Keerthy) and Best Costume Design (Rajshree Patnaik, Gaurang Shah and Archana Rao). The film won four Filmfare Awards South (including Best Film – Telugu and Best Actress – Telugu), three South Indian International Movie Awards (including Best Film – Telugu and Best Actress – Telugu), and ten awards at Zee Cine Awards Telugu, among others.

The film has also garnered the Equality in Cinema award at the 2018 Indian Film Festival of Melbourne. Mahanati was selected in the Indian Panorama section at the 49th International Film Festival of India and was also screened at the Shanghai International Film Festival.
