= Eduruleni Manishi (1975 film) =

- Theatrical release poster
- Directed by: K. Bapayya
- Written by: Bhamidipati Radhakrishna (story / dialogues)
- Screenplay by: K. Bapayya
- Produced by: C. Ashwini Dutt
- Starring: N. T. Rama Rao; Vanisri
- Cinematography: S. Venkataratnam
- Edited by: Akkineni Sanjeevi
- Music by: K. V. Mahadevan
- Production company: Vyjayanthi Movies
- Release date: 12 December 1975
- Running time: 141 mins
- Country: India
- Language: Telugu

Eduruleni Manishi (transl. The Man Without Opposition) is a 1975 Telugu-language action film directed by K. Bapayya. It stars N. T. Rama Rao and Vanisri, with music composed by K. V. Mahadevan. This film is the debut of Aswini Dutt's Vyjayanthi Movies banner in the film industry. It is a remake of the Hindi film Johny Mera Naam (1970). The film's title was later used as the title of Rama Rao's memoir, by his wife Lakshmi Parvathi.

== Cast ==
- N. T. Rama Rao as Raja Shekar
- Vanisri as Latha
- Jaggayya as Inspector Gopi
- Satyanarayana as Shekar's father
- Kanta Rao as Sarkar
- Prabhakar Reddy as Ranga Rao/ Jaggu
- Ramadas as Jaggu's accomplice
- Raja Babu as Bachi
- Allu Ramalingaiah as Bhadraiah
- Jaya Bhaskar as Vasu
- Padmapriya as Sarala
- Hemalatha as Latha's mother
- Nirmalamma as Bhadraiah's wife
- Anand Mohan as Rattaiah

== Production ==
Eduruleni Manishi is the first film produced by Ashwini Dutt under the banner Vyjayanthi Movies.

== Soundtrack ==
Music composed by K. V. Mahadevan. Lyrics were written by Acharya Aatreya.

| Song title | Singers | length |
|---|---|---|
| "Kasiga Vundi" | S. P. Balasubrahmanyam, P. Susheela | 3:08 |
| "Hey Krishna Mukunda Murari" | S. P. Balasubrahmanyam | 3:07 |
| "Yenthavadu Yenthavadu" | S. P. Balasubrahmanyam, P. Susheela | 3:10 |
| "Ekkado Ekkado Thagalaraani" | S. P. Balasubrahmanyam, P. Susheela | 3:00 |
| "Kangaru Okate Kangaru" | P. Susheela | 3:08 |
