= Yevade Subramanyam =

2015 Indian film by Nag Ashwin

Yevade Subramanyam?
- Theatrical release poster
- Directed by: Nag Ashwin
- Written by: Nag Ashwin
- Produced by: Priyanka Dutt; Swapna Dutt
- Starring: Nani; Malvika Nair; Vijay Devarakonda; Ritu Varma
- Cinematography: Rakesh Erukulla; Naveen Yadav
- Edited by: Kotagiri Venkateswara Rao
- Music by: Radhan; Ilayaraaja (1 song)
- Production company: Swapna Cinema
- Release date: 21 March 2015
- Running time: 150 minutes
- Country: India
- Language: Telugu

Yevade Subramanyam? (transl. Who is Subramanyam?) is a 2015 Indian Telugu-language coming-of-age drama film written and directed by Nag Ashwin (in his directoral debut) Produced by Priyanka Dutt, and Swapna Dutt, the film stars Nani, Malvika Nair, Vijay Deverakonda (in his lead debut), and Ritu Varma while Krishnam Raju, Nassar, and Kireeti Damaraju play supporting roles.

The plot follows Subramanyam (Nani), a corporate man who sets out on a journey of self-discovery. Much of the filming took place at the Everest Base Camps in Nepal, becoming the first Indian film to be shot at the location. Released on 21 March 2015, the film received mostly positive reviews from the critics, who praised Nani's performance and the message-oriented script. but, criticized the slow-paced narration. The film was a sleeper hit.

== Plot ==
Subramanyam "Subbu" is a materialistic and ambitious IIM graduate who is determined to climb the corporate ladder. Subbu works under his boss, Pasupathi, who shares his ruthless drive for success. Together, they aim to acquire the company of Pasupathi's rival, Ramayya. Though their initial attempts fail, Subbu cleverly manipulates Ramayya's employees into selling their shares, marking Pasupathi's biggest corporate triumph. In recognition of his success, Subbu becomes engaged to Pasupathi's daughter, Rhea.

During the engagement ceremony, Subbu's life takes an unexpected turn when his childhood friend Rishi reenters his life. Rishi is the antithesis of Subbu—an energetic, free-spirited individual who lives life without concern for material success. On the same day, they meet Anandi, a free-spirited but lonely girl, in a pub. Rishi reveals his long-held dream of traveling to Doodh Kasi, a sacred lake in the Himalayas, with Subbu.

Meanwhile, the corporate world of Pasupathi and Subbu is shaken when they lose crucial shares, threatening their acquisition of Ramayya's company. Pasupathi, enraged, threatens to end Subbu's engagement and fire him if he cannot secure the deal. Desperate, Subbu approaches Ramayya, who politely declines to sell his company. Feeling dejected, Subbu considers Rishi's proposal to visit Doodh Kasi. Rishi playfully promises to return the details of a key shareholder if Subbu agrees to the trip. This leads them to Anandi, whose father holds the critical shares needed for the acquisition.

Subbu and Rishi discover that Anandi is lonely and has no close relationships. They befriend her, though Subbu remains focused on getting her to sign over the shares. However, Anandi repeatedly postpones signing the documents, which frustrates Subbu, who is torn between his corporate ambitions and the growing bond with Anandi and Rishi.

One day, Subbu and Rishi come across an injured girl on the road and rush her to the hospital. The girl dies due to delayed medical attention, a tragedy that deeply affects Rishi. This incident sparks a heated argument between the two friends, where Rishi criticizes Subbu's materialistic lifestyle. In response, Subbu accuses Rishi of leading a purposeless life. The argument drives Rishi away.

The next day, Subbu receives a devastating phone call informing him that Rishi has died in a road accident. Shocked and grieving, Subbu and Anandi travel to Kolkata for Rishi's funeral. There, Anandi promises to give Subbu the shares if he accompanies her to Doodh Kasi to scatter Rishi's ashes.

The film then focuses on Subbu and Anandi's journey to Doodh Kasi, guided by a local named Pemba. Throughout the trek, Subbu begins to transform, shedding his materialistic mindset and learning to appreciate the present moment. Along the way, they meet Robert, a multi-billionaire who regrets spending his life chasing wealth and missing out on meaningful relationships. Robert's story profoundly impacts Subbu, reinforcing the importance of living a fulfilling life.

Subbu's transformation is further deepened when he helps a pregnant woman in labour, experiencing genuine joy as he holds the newborn baby. This journey also allows Subbu and Anandi to grow closer, with love blossoming between them.

Upon returning from Doodh Kasi, a changed Subbu breaks off his engagement with Rhea and returns Ramayya's company to him. He even applies for a job at Ramayya's firm, symbolizing his shift away from ruthless ambition. In the film's closing scene, Subbu, now embracing a more meaningful life, asks Anandi for a "share" in her life, indirectly proposing marriage.

== Cast ==
- Nani as Subramanyam "Subbu"
- Malavika Nair as Anandi "Nandi" (Voice dubbed by Savitha Reddy)
- Vijay Deverakonda as Rishi
- Ritu Varma as Rhea
- Krishnam Raju as Ramayya
- Nassar as Pasupathi
- Rajesh Vivek as Pemba
- Sowcar Janaki as Susheela
- Prathap Pothen as man in the butterfly park
- Srinivas Avasarala as Prabhakar
- Pavitra Lokesh as Rishi's mother
- Kireeti Damaraju as Kireeti
- Sivannarayana as Nandi's neighbour
- Sri Sudha Bhimireddy as Naina
- Akhil Kondepudi as young Rishi
- Karate Kalyani as Rama
- Gururaj Manepalli as Mani
- Jayanthi Reddy
- Vaishnavi Merla
- Sindhu Kaza
- Padmaja Lanka
- C. V. L. Narasimha Rao as Gopal Rao
- Gundu Sudarshan as Nandi's neighbour
- Sankalp Gora as Young Subbu
- Ananth as Nandi's neighbour

== Production ==
=== Development ===
Filming near the Himalayas took forty days. Notably, Yevade Subramanyam is the only Indian film shot at some of Everest's highest points.

To prepare for the shoot, director Nag Ashwin trained on an inclined treadmill for several months. Of the 33-person crew, only 27 completed the shoot, as several members were affected by altitude sickness and other ailments, requiring treatment in Kathmandu.

The production began by trekking from Lukla to Gokyo and then to Chola Pass. During filming, the cast and crew faced challenges like altitude sickness, cold weather, and limited food options. Despite the hardships, there were lighthearted moments, such as a makeup artist being chased by a baby yak and the director being hit by a horse. A highlight for the director was meeting Amelia Hillary, granddaughter of Sir Edmund Hillary, which he took as a good omen.

=== Marketing ===
The team behind Yevade Subramanyam came up with a unique promotion strategy for their film as a Sankranti gift where in Nani would read the news bulletin on TV 5 news channel. On January 10, a "first look" motion poster was released featuring Nani.

== Soundtrack ==
The soundtrack was composed by Radhan of Andala Rakshasi fame and released by Lahari Music.

Ilayaraaja composed one song "Challa Gaali" adapted from his own song "Thendral Vanthu" which was composed for the Tamil film Avatharam (1995).

Yevade Subramanyam

Soundtrack album by Radhan
- Released: 2015
- Recorded: 2015
- Genre: Soundtrack
- Length: 22:19
- Label: Lahari Music
- Producer: Radhan

Radhan chronology
| Valeba Raja (2014) | Yevade Subramanyam (2015) | Darling 2 (2016) |

Ilaiyaraaja chronology
| Mythri (2015) | Yevade Subramanyam (2015) | Rudhramadevi (2015) |

Track listing
| No. | Title | Lyrics | Music | Singer(s) | Length |
|---|---|---|---|---|---|
| 1. | "Beautiful Zindagi" | Vasishta Sharma | Radhan | Nikhita Gandhi | 2:54 |
| 2. | "Idhera" | Ramajogayya Sastry | Radhan | Mohit Chauhan | 5:46 |
| 3. | "Nuvvu Nuvvu Kadhu" | Ramajogayya Sastry | Radhan | Ranjith, Ramy | 3:59 |
| 4. | "O Kala" | Ananta Sriram | Radhan | Harini | 3:42 |
| 5. | "Yevade Subramanyam" | Ramajogayya Sastry | Radhan | Ramy | 1:51 |
| 6. | "Challa Gaali Thakuthunna" | Ananta Sriram | Ilayaraaja | Senthil, Rakshita Suresh | 4:07 |
| Total length: | | | | | 22:19 |

== Release and reception ==
Yevade Subramanyam received positive reviews and was a commercial success.

Hemanth Kumar of The Times of India rated the film 3.5 out of 5 stars and wrote, "Yevade Subramanyam isn’t a film where you’ll laugh out loud, despite its subtle humour. It’s a memory that you must savour until the very end. Like life itself". Jeevi of Idlebrain.com rated the film 3.25 out of 5 and wrote, "On a whole, Yevade Subramanyam is a nice movie and you may watch it!" Sangeetha Devi Dundoo of The Hindu wrote, "Go watch Yevade Subramanyam . If you like the idea of breaking free and living by your own rules, you’ll nod in agreement".

== Awards and nominations ==
| Date of ceremony | Award | Category | Recipient(s) and nominee(s) | Result | Ref. |
|---|---|---|---|---|---|
| 24 & 25 January 2016 | 1st IIFA Utsavam | Best Picture - Telugu | Yevade Subramanyam | Nominated | |
| 24 & 25 January 2016 | 1st IIFA Utsavam | Best Actress in Supporting Role - Telugu | Ritu Varma | Nominated | |
| 24 & 25 January 2016 | 1st IIFA Utsavam | Best Lyricist - Telugu | Ramajogayya Sastry | Nominated | |
| 24 & 25 January 2016 | 1st IIFA Utsavam | Best Playback Singer Female - Telugu | Nikhita Gandhi | Nominated | |
| 30 June and 1 July 2016 | 5th South Indian International Movie Awards | Best Debut Director - Telugu | Nag Ashwin | Nominated | |
| 30 June and 1 July 2016 | 5th South Indian International Movie Awards | Best Debut Actor - Telugu | Vijay Deverakonda | Nominated | |
| 30 June and 1 July 2016 | 5th South Indian International Movie Awards | Best Debut Actress - Telugu | Malavika Nair | Nominated | |
| 30 June and 1 July 2016 | 5th South Indian International Movie Awards | Best Lyricist - Telugu | Ramajogayya Sastry | Nominated | |
| 2015 | Nandi Awards | Best Debut Director | Nag Ashwin | Won | |
| 2015 | Nandi Awards | Best Feature Film (Second) | Priyanka Dutt | Won | |
