= List of Telugu films of 2016 =

This is a list of Telugu language films produced in the Tollywood in India that were released in the year 2016.

== Box office collection ==
The top films released in 2016 by worldwide box office gross revenue are as follows:

Highest-grossing films of 2016
Rank	Title	Production company(s)	Worldwide gross	Ref.
1	Janatha Garage	Mythri Movie Makers; Eros International	₹134.80 crore (US$14 million)	
2	Sarrainodu	Geetha Arts	₹127.60 crore (US$13 million)	
3	Oopiri	PVP Cinema	₹100 crore (US$10 million)	
4	Dhruva	Geetha Arts	₹87.6 crore (US$9.1 million)	
5	Soggade Chinni Nayana	Annapurna Studios	₹85.26 crore (US$8.9 million)	
6	Nannaku Prematho	Sri Venkateswara Cine Chitra; Reliance Entertainment	₹84.46 crore (US$8.8 million)	
7	Sardaar Gabbar Singh	North Star Entertainment; Eros International; Pawan Kalyan Creative Works	₹85.55 crore (US$8.9 million)	
8	A Aa	Haarika & Hassine Creations	₹75.4 crore (US$7.8 million)	
9	Brahmotsavam	PVP Cinema; G. Mahesh Babu Entertainment	₹63.70 crore (US$6.6 million)	
10	Babu Bangaram	Sithara Entertainments	₹51 crore (US$5.3 million)	

== January–June ==
Opening		Title	Director	Cast	Production house	Ref
J A N	1	Chitram Bhalare Vichitram	Bhanu Prakash Balusu	Chandini Tamilarasan, Sowmya, Subhasree, Jeeva, Surya, Venugopal Rao, Prabhas Sreenu, Allari Subhashini	Kartika Dream Creations	
J A N	1	Abbayitho Ammayi	Ramesh Varma	Naga Shourya, Palak Lalwani, Rao Ramesh, Brahmanandam, Mohan	JG Production	
J A N	1	Nenu.. Sailaja...	Kishore Tirumala	Ram Pothineni, Keerthy Suresh, Sathyaraj, Pradeep Rawat, Prince Cecil, Rohini	Sri Sravanthi Movies	
J A N	13	Nannaku Prematho	Sukumar	Jr NTR, Rakul Preet, Jagapathi Babu, Rajendra Prasad	Sri Venkateswara Cine Chitra; Reliance Entertainment	
J A N	14	Express Raja	Merlapaka Gandhi	Sharwanand, Surabhi, Harish Uthaman	UV Creations	
J A N	14	Dictator	Sriwass	Nandamuri Balakrishna, Anjali, Sonal Chauhan	Eros International; Vedaashwa Creations	
J A N	15	Soggade Chinni Nayana	Kalyan Krishna	Nagarjuna, Ramya Krishnan, Lavanya Tripathi, Nassar, Sampath Raj, Brahmanandam	Annapurna Studios	
J A N	29	Lacchimdeviki O Lekkundi	Jagadish Talasila	Lavanya Tripathi, Naveen Chandra	Mayukha Creations	
J A N	29	Seethamma Andalu Ramayya Sitralu	Gavireddy Srinivas Reddy	Raj Tarun, Arthana, Aadarsh, Raja Ravindra	Sri Sailendra Productions	
F E B	5	Lajja	Narasimha Nandi	Madhumitha, Varun, Shiva	P.L.K Productions	
F E B	5	Speedunnodu	Bhimaneni Srinivasa Rao	Bellamkonda Sreenivas, Sonarika Bhadoria	Good Will Cinema	
F E B	5	Vennello Hai Hai	Vamsy	Ajmal, Nikitha Narayan	D V Cine Creations	
F E B	12	Krishna Gaadi Veera Prema Gaadha	Hanu Raghavapudi	Nani, Mehreen Pirzada, Sampath Raj, Murali Sharma, Harish Uthaman	14 Reels Entertainment	
F E B	12	Garam	Madan	Aadi, Adah Sharma, Brahmanandam	RK Studio	
F E B	19	Krishnashtami	Vasu Varma	Sunil, Nikki Galrani, Dimple Chopade	Sri Venkateswara Creations	
F E B	19	Malupu	Sathya Prabhas Pinisetty	Aadhi, Nikki Galrani, Mithun Chakraborty, Richa Pallod, Pasupathy	Aadarsha Chitralaya Pvt. Ltd.	
F E B	26	Kshanam	Ravikanth	Adivi Sesh, Adah Sharma, Anasuya	PVP cinema	
F E B	26	Eluka Majaka	Relangi Narasimha Rao	Vennela Kishore, Brahmanandam, Pavani	Naa Friends Art Movies	
F E B	26	Padesave	Chuniya	Karthik Raju, Nithya Shetty, Sam	Ayan Creations	
F E B	26	Terror	Sathish Kasetty	Srikanth, Nikhita Thukral, Prudhvi, Nassar	Akhanda Bharath Creations	
F E B	26	Veeri Veeri Gu	M V Sagar	Rudra, Venne, Raghu Babu	Shivakruthi Creations	
M A R	4	Guntur Talkies	Praveen Sattaru	Siddu Jonnalagadda, Rashmi Gautham, Shraddha Das	RK Studios	
M A R	4	Kalyana Vaibhogame	Nandini Reddy	Naga Shourya, Malavika Nair, Raasi	Sri Ranjith Movies	
M A R	4	Shourya	K. Dasaradh	Manoj Manchu, Regina Cassandra, Prakash Raj	Suraksha Entertainments	
M A R	11	Tuntari	Kumar Nagendra	Nara Rohit, Latha Hegde, Kabir Duhan Singh	Sri Keerthi Films	
M A R	11	Tulasi Dalam	R. P. Patnaik	Nischal, Vandana Gupta, R. P. Patnaik	Colours Entertainments	
M A R	11	O Sthree Repu Raa	T. Ashok Kumar Reddy	Ashish Gandhi, Diksha Panth, Shruthi Mol	Rending Lamp creations	
M A R	11	Nenu Maa College	S. S. Dhakar	Manoj Nandan, Sisha, Srihari	Golden Fish Attractions	
M A R	18	Drishya Kavyam	Bella Ramakrishna Reddy	Ram Karthik, Kashmira Kulkarni	Pushyami Film Makers	
M A R	18	Seesa	Mohamad Issack	Sivaji, Chaswa, Namratha	Laxmi Venkateswara Films	
M A R	18	Dandakaranyam	R. Narayana Murthy	R. Narayana Murthy, Gaddar	Sneha Chitra Pictures	
M A R	18	Romance With Finance	Rajju Kumpatla	Merina Abraham, Satish Babu	Rishi Entertainments	
M A R	23	Run	Anil Kanneganti	Sundeep Kishan, Anisha Ambrose, Bobby Simha	AK Entertainments	
M A R	25	Oopiri	Vamsi Paidipally	Nagarjuna, Karthi, Tamannaah	PVP cinema	
M A R	25	Mohabbat Mein	Mahesh Surya	Karthik, Hamida	Aashisth Movies	
M A R	25	Ammayi Aaruguru	G. Muraliprasad	Ramachandra, Aashalatha, Ravi	Akshay Prathyusha Entertainments	
M A R	25	Meera	Santhosh Eubulus	Aditya Anand, Ishika Singh	150 M Entertainenrs	
A P R	1	7 To 4	Vijay Sekhar Sankranth	Anand Bachu, Raj Bala, Radhika, Loukya	Milk Movies	
A P R	1	Attack	Ram Gopal Varma	Manchu Manoj, Surabhi, Jagapati Babu, Prakash Raj, Abhimanyu Singh, Poonam Kaur	CK Entertainments	
A P R	1	Savitri	Pavan Sadineni	Nara Rohit, Nanditha Raj	Vision film Makers	
A P R	8	Sardaar Gabbar Singh	K. S. Ravindra	Pawan Kalyan, Kajal Aggarwal, Sharad Kelkar	Pawan Kalyan Creative Works; North Star Entertainment; Eros International	
A P R	14	Eedo Rakam Aado Rakam	G. Nageswara Reddy	Manchu Vishnu, Raj Tarun, Hebah Patel, Sonarika Bhadoria	A.K. Entertainments	
A P R	22	Sarrainodu	Boyapati Srinu	Allu Arjun, Srikanth, Aadhi Pinisetty, Rakul Preet Singh, Catherine Tresa, Pradeep Rawat, Sai Kumar, Jayaprakash, Brahmanandam	Geetha Arts	
A P R	29	Raja Cheyyi Vesthe	Pradeep	Nara Rohit, Isha Talwar, Taraka Ratna	Varahi Chalana Chitram	
M A Y	5	Supreme	Anil Ravipudi	Sai Dharam Tej, Raashi Khanna, Master Mikhail Gandhi, Rajendra Prasad, Kabir Duhan Singh, Ravi Kishan, Sai Kumar	Sri Venkateswara Creations	
M A Y	20	Brahmotsavam	Srikanth Addala	Mahesh Babu, Kajal Aggarwal, Samantha Ruth Prabhu, Pranitha Subhash	PVP cinema G. Mahesh Babu Entertainment Pvt. Ltd	
J U N	2	A Aa	Trivikram Srinivas	Nithiin, Samantha, Naresh, Srinivas Avasarala	Haarika & Hassine Creations	
J U N	3	Sri Sri	Muppalaneni Siva	Krishna, Vijay Nirmala		
J U N	10	Okka Ammayi Thappa	Rajasimha Tadinada	Sundeep Kishan, Nithya Menen, Ravi Kishan, Ali, Prudhviraj	Anji Reddy Productions	
J U N	10	Parvathipuram	M.A. Chowdary	Madan, Srushti Dange, Tapashree, Kushi Sharma, Leena David		
J U N	10	Right Right	J. B. Murali krishna	Sumanth Ashwin, Pooja Jhaveri, Pavani Gangireddy, Nassar	Sri Satya Entertainments	
J U N	17	Gentleman	Mohan Krishna Indraganti	Nani, Niveda Thomas, Surabhi, Srinivas Avasarala, Tanikella Bharani, Vennela Kishore	Sridevi Movies	
J U N	17	Premikudu	Kala Sundeep	Maanas N, Sanam Shetty, Shakalaka Shankar, Paruchuri Venkateswara Rao, Bhanu Chander	SS Cinemas Digipost	
J U N	17	Meeku Meere Maaku Meme	Hussain Sha Kiran	Tarun Shetty, Avantika Mishra, Jenny Honey, Kireeti Damaraju	Nakama Planet Green Studios	
J U N	17	Guppedantha Prema	Vinod Lingala	Sai Ronak, Aditi Singh		
J U N	24	Oka Manasu	Rama Raju Gottimukkala	Naga Shourya, Niharika Konidela, Rao Ramesh, Srinivas Avasarala	Madhura Entertainment	
J U N	24	Kundanapu Bomma	Mullapudi Vara	Chandini Chowdary, Sudhakar Komakula, Sudheer Varma, Aalapati Lakshmi	Sri Satya Entertainments	
J U N	24	Rajadhi Raja	Cheran	Sharwanand, Nithya Menen, Prakash Raj, Santhanam	Brundavan Pictures	

== July–December ==
Opening		Title	Director	Cast	Production house	Ref
J U L	1	Arddhanaari	Bhanushanker Chowdary	Arjun Yajath, Mouryaani	Patthikonda Cinemas	
J U L	1	Rojulu Marayi	Murali Krishna Mudidani	Chethan, Parwatheesham, Kruthika Jayakumar, Tejaswi Madivada	Good Cinema Group	
J U L	7	Antham	GSSP Kalyan	Rashmi Gautam, Charandeep	Charan Creations	
J U L	8	Iddaram	Sudhakar Vinukonda	Sanjeev, Sai Krupa	Javan and Caspian International	
J U L	15	Selfie Raja	G. Eshwar Reddy	Allari Naresh, Sakshi Chaudhary, Kamna Jethmalani, Saptagiri	AK Entertainments	
J U L	15	Nayaki	Goverdhan Reddy	Trisha, Ganesh Venkatraman	Giridhar production House	
J U L	29	Pelli Choopulu	Tharun Bhascker Dhaassyam	Vijay Deverakonda, Ritu Varma	Dharmapada Creations	
J U L	29	Jakkanna	Vamshi Krishna Akella	Sunil, Mannara Chopra, Kabir Duhan Singh, Posani Krishna Murali	RPA Creations	
A U G	5	Manamantha	Chandra Sekhar Yeleti	Mohanlal, Gautami, Viswant Duddumpudi, Anisha Ambrose, S. P. Balasubrahmanyam	Varahi Chalana Chitram	
A U G	5	Srirastu Subhamastu	Parasuram	Allu Sirish, Lavanya Tripathi, Prakash Raj, Sumalatha, Rao Ramesh, Sumithra, Subbaraju	Geetha Arts	
A U G	12	Babu Bangaram	Maruthi	Venkatesh, Nayanthara	Sithara Entertainments	
A U G	12	Bommala Ramaram	Nishanth Pudhari	Soori, Roopa Reddy, Priyadarshi Pullikonda, Thiruveer	Medieval Storytellers	
A U G	13	Thikka	Sunil Reddy	Sai Dharam Tej, Mannara Chopra, Rajendra Prasad	Sri Venkateshwara Movie Makers	
A U G	19	Aatadukundam Raa	G. Nageswara Reddy	Sushanth, Sonam Bajwa	Sri Nag Corporation	
A U G	19	Chuttalabbai	Veerabhadram Chowdary	Aadi, Namitha Pramod	Sri Iswarya Lakshmi Movies	
A U G	26	Banthi Poola Janaki	Nellutla Praveen Chander	Dhanraj, Diksha Panth, Sudheer, Chandra	Ujwala Creations	
A U G	26	Avasaraniko Abaddam	Suresh KV	Lokesh, Rajesh, Shashank, Geethanjali	Chakram Creations	
S E P	1	Janatha Garage	Koratala Siva	Mohanlal, Jr. NTR, Samantha Ruth Prabhu, Nithya Menon	Mythri Movie Makers	
S E P	9	Jyo Achyutananda	Srinivas Avasarala	Nara Rohit, Naga Shourya, Regina Cassandra	Varahi Chalana Chitram	
S E P	11	Hora Hori	Teja	Dileep Reddy, Daksha Nagarkar		
S E P	16	Nirmala Convent	G. Naga Koteshwar Rao	Roshan Meka, Shriya Sharma, Nagarjuna	Matrix Team Works; Annapurna Studios	
S E P	16	Siddhartha	K V Dayanand Reddy	Sagar, Sakshi Chaudhary, Kota Srinivasa Rao	Rama Dhuta Creations	
S E P	16	Ghatana	Sripriya	Nithya Menen, Krish J. Sathaar	Sunmoon Creations	
S E P	23	Majnu	Virinchi Varma	Nani, Anu Emmanuel	Anandi Art Creations; Keva Movies	
S E P	30	Hyper	Santosh Srinivas	Ram Pothineni, Raashi Khanna, Sathyaraj, Rao Ramesh	14 Reels Entertainment	
O C T	1	Nee Jathaleka	Lawerence Dasari	Naga Shourya, Parul Gulati, Sarayu	Sri Satya Vidhura Movies	
O C T	6	Jaguar	Mahadev	Nikhil Gowda, Deepti Sati, Jagapati Babu, Rao Ramesh, Ramya Krishna, Sampath Raj, Adithya Menon	Chennambika Films	
O C T	7	Abhinetri	A. L. Vijay	Prabhu Deva, Tamannaah, Sonu Sood	Prabhu Deva Studios; MVV Cinema	
O C T	7	Eedu Gold Ehe	Veeru Potla	Sunil, Richa Panai, Sushma Raj, Naresh, Puneet Issar	AK Entertainment	
O C T	7	Mana Oori Ramayanam	Prakash Raj	Prakash Raj, Priyamani, Prudhviraj, Satyadev	Prakash Raj Factory	
O C T	7	Premam	Chandoo Mondeti	Naga Chaitanya, Shruti Hassan, Anupama Parameswaran	Sithara Entertainments	
O C T	21	Ism	Puri Jagannadh	Nandamuri Kalyan Ram, Aditi Arya, Jagapati Babu	N. T. R. Arts	
O C T	21	L7	Mukund Pande	Adith Arun, Pooja Jhaveri, Vennela Kishore	Rahul Movie Makers	
O C T	21	Nandini Nursing Home	P. V. Giri	Nawin Vijay Krishna, Shravya, Nithya Naresh, Shakalaka Shankar, Jaya Prakash Reddy, Vennela Kishore	SVC Entertainments PVT Ltd banner	
O C T	21	Shankara	Thathineni Satya Prakash	Nara Rohith, Regina Cassandra, M. S. Narayana, John Vijay, Rajeev Kanakala	Sai Leela Movies	
O C T	21	Thanu Vachenanta	Venkat Kancherla	Rashmi Gautam, Teja Kakumanu, Dhanya Balakrishna, Chalaki Chanti	Sri Atchuyutha Arts	
N O V	4	Aavu Puli Madhyalo Prabhas Pelli	Ravi Pachipala	Kalakeya Prabhakar, Ravi Teja, Ashwini Chandrasekhar	Red Carpet Reels	
N O V	4	Manalo Okkadu	R. P. Patnaik	R. P. Patnaik, Anita Hassanandani Reddy	Uni Craft Movies	
N O V	4	Naruda Donoruda	Mallik Ram	Sumanth, Pallavi Subhash, Tanikella Bharani	Rama Reels; SS Creations; Annapoorna Studios	
N O V	11	Sahasam Swasaga Sagipo	Gautham Vasudev Menon	Naga Chaitanya, Manjima Mohan, Baba Sehgal	Dwaraka Creations	
N O V	18	Ekkadiki Pothavu Chinnavada	Vi Anand	Nikhil Siddharth, Hebah Patel, Nandita Swetha, Avika Gor	Meghana Arts	
N O V	25	Jayammu Nischayammu Raa	Shiva Raj Kanumuri	Srinivasa Reddy, Shamna Kasim, Posani Krishna Murali, Sree Vishnu, Ravi Varma, Krishnudu	Shiva Raj Kanumuri productions	
N O V	25	Aata	Raaj Kumar Reddy	Shradda Das, Gayathri Iyer		
D E C	2	Araku Road Lo	Wassudev	Sairam Shankar, Nikesha Patel	Seshadri Creations & Sri Venkateswara Entertainments	
D E C	9	Dhruva	Surender Reddy	Ram Charan, Rakul Preet Singh, Aravind Swamy	Geetha Arts	
D E C	16	Meelo Evaru Koteeswarudu	E. Satthibabu	Naveen Chandra, Shruti Sodhi, Saloni Aswani, Dhanraj, Raghu Babu, Prabhas Sreenu, Pruthviraj Balireddy	Sri Sathya Sai Arts	
D E C	16	Janaki Ramudu	T. Satish Babu	Mouryaani, Naveen Sanjay, Arjun Yajath	Kaveri Media; Kaveri Travels	
D E C	16	Naanna Nenu Naa Boyfriends	Bhaskar Bandi	Hebah Patel, Tejaswi Madivada, Noel Sean, Parvateesam, Rao Ramesh, Sana	Lucky Media	
D E C	23	Saptagiri Express	Arun Pawar	Saptagiri, Roshini Prakash, Ali, Posani Krishna Murali, Shayaji Shinde, Shakalaka Shankar	Sai Celluloid Cinematic Creations	
D E C	23	Vangaveeti	Ram Gopal Varma	Sandeep Kumar, Vamsi Nakkanti, Vamsi Changanti, Naina Ganguly, Kautilya	Bad-Cow films	
D E C	23	Sarabha	Narsimha Rao	Aakash Kumar Sehdev, Mishti Chakravarty, Jayaprada, Nassar	AKS Entertainments	
D E C	24	Pittagoda	Anudeep K. V.	Vishwadev, Punarnavi Bhupalam	Sunshine Cinemas	
D E C	30	Appatlo Okadundevadu	Saagar K Chandra	Nara Rohith, Sree Vishnu, Tanya Hope, Rajeev Kanakala, Posani Krishna Murali	Aran Media Works	
D E C	30	Karam Dosa	Trivikram Gajulapalli	Shivakumar Ramachandravarapu, Surya Srinivas, Y. Kasi Viswanath	Veenaa Vedika Productions	
D E C	30	Intlo Deyyam Nakem Bhayam	G. Nageswara Reddy	Allari Naresh, Kruthika Jayakumar, Rajendra Prasad	Sri Venkateswara Cine Chitra	
D E C	30	Nenosta	Parand Kalyan	Gnan Prakash, Surya Srinivas, Priyanka Pallavi	Raising Dreams	

== See also ==
- List of Telugu films of 2015
- Lists of Telugu-language films
- List of Telugu films of 2017
