= Oohalu Gusagusalade (soundtrack) =

Soundtrack album by Kalyani Malik
- Released: 28 April 2014
- Recorded: 2013
- Genre: Feature film soundtrack
- Length: 15:13
- Language: Telugu
- Label: Vel Records
- Producer: Kalyani Malik

Kalyani Malik chronology
Anthaku Mundu Aa Taruvatha (2013)	Oohalu Gusagusalade (2014)	Bandipotu (2015)

Oohalu Gusagusalade is the soundtrack to the 2014 film of the same name directed by Srinivas Avasarala in his directorial debut, featuring Naga Shaurya, Raashii Khanna and Avasarala. The album featured four songs composed by Kalyani Malik with lyrics written by Anantha Sriram and Sirivennela Seetharama Sastry and was released through Vel Records on 28 April 2014.

The soundtrack met with positive response from critics and Sunitha Upadrashta received Filmfare Award for Best Female Playback Singer – Telugu for "Em Sandeham Ledhu". The soundtrack also won six awards at the Mirchi Music Awards South in the Telugu branch, including Album of the Year.

== Development ==
Kalyani Malik was selected to compose the film's music and background score in his maiden association with Avasarala. Malik commenced the film's recording at Hyderabad on 1 October 2013 even before the start of the film's production. The first song was recorded by Sunitha during the recording session. Initially, Anantha Sriram was the sole lyricist of the film contributing two songs for the album, but Sirivennela Seetharama Sastry also wrote the song "Inthakante Vere" which had two versions recorded by Hemachandra and Karunya, respectively. Malik felt that the film's music was reminiscent of Salil Chowdhury's compositions for Chhoti Si Baat (1976).

== Release ==
The film's soundtrack was released under the Vel Records label on 28 April 2014. The release coincided with a promotional event held at Hyderabad, with the film's cast and crew in attendance along with S. S. Rajamouli, V. V. Vinayak, Boyapati Srinu, Allari Naresh, Nani, Mohana Krishna Indraganti, B. V. Nandini Reddy, D. Suresh Babu, amongst others. On 21 June 2014 (World Music Day), Malik released a press note dedicated the film's soundtrack to music lovers.

== Reception ==
The soundtrack received positive response from critics. Sangeetha Devi Dundoo of The Hindu described Malik's musical score and soundtrack as an asset to the film. Critic based at The Times of India summarized "Kalyani Koduri's music and background score is beautiful and it captures the essence of Srini's sharp writing." Sandhya Rao of Sify called the music "melodious". Karthik Srinivasan of Milliblog wrote "The under-rated Kalyani Koduri proves that he deserves to shed that tag". Analyzing the trends of Telugu film music in the past decade, Krishna Sripada of The Hindu wrote "Melody lovers would have really appreciated Kalyani Koduri's Oohalu Gusagusalade with its dulcet and calming tunes."

== Track listing ==
Oohalu Gusagusalade (Original Motion Picture Soundtrack) track listing
No.	Title	Lyrics	Artist(s)	Length
1.	"Emiti Hadavidi"	Anantha Sriram	Deepu, Shravani V.	03:26
2.	"Inthakante Vere" (Version 1)	Sirivennela Seetharama Sastry	Hemachandra	03:45
3.	"Em Sandeham Ledu"	Anantha Sriram	Kalyani Malik, Sunitha Upadrashta	03:52
4.	"Inthakante Vere" (Version 2)	Sirivennela Seetharama Sastry	Karunya	04:09
Total length:				15:13

== Accolades ==
Accolades for Oohalu Gusagusalade (Original Motion Picture Soundtrack)
Award (Note: Awards are in Alphabetical order.)	Date of ceremony (Note: Date is linked to the article about the awards held that year, wherever possible.)	Category	Recipient(s)	Result	Ref.
Filmfare Awards South	26 June 2015	Best Music Director – Telugu	Kalyani Malik	Nominated	
Filmfare Awards South	26 June 2015	Best Lyricist – Telugu	Anantha Sriram – ("Em Sandeham Ledu")	Nominated	
Filmfare Awards South	26 June 2015	Best Male Playback Singer – Telugu	Hemachandra – ("Inthakante Vere")	Nominated	
Filmfare Awards South	26 June 2015	Best Female Playback Singer – Telugu	Sunitha Upadrashta – ("Em Sandeham Ledu")	Won	
Mirchi Music Awards South	23 July 2015	Album of the Year – Telugu	Oohalu Gusagusalade	Won	
Mirchi Music Awards South	23 July 2015	Song of the Year – Telugu	"Em Sandeham Ledu"	Won	
Mirchi Music Awards South	23 July 2015	Music Composer of the Year – Telugu	Kalyani Malik – ("Em Sandeham Ledu")	Won	
Mirchi Music Awards South	23 July 2015	Lyricist of the Year – Telugu	Anantha Sriram – ("Em Sandeham Ledu")	Won	
Mirchi Music Awards South	23 July 2015	Male Vocalist of the Year – Telugu	Kalyani Malik – ("Em Sandeham Ledu")	Won	
Mirchi Music Awards South	23 July 2015	Female Vocalist of the Year – Telugu	Sunitha Upadrashta – ("Em Sandeham Ledu")	Won	
South Indian International Movie Awards	6–7 August 2015	Best Lyricist – Telugu	Anantha Sriram – ("Em Sandeham Ledu")	Nominated	
