= SIIMA Award for Best Supporting Actor – Telugu =

Film award

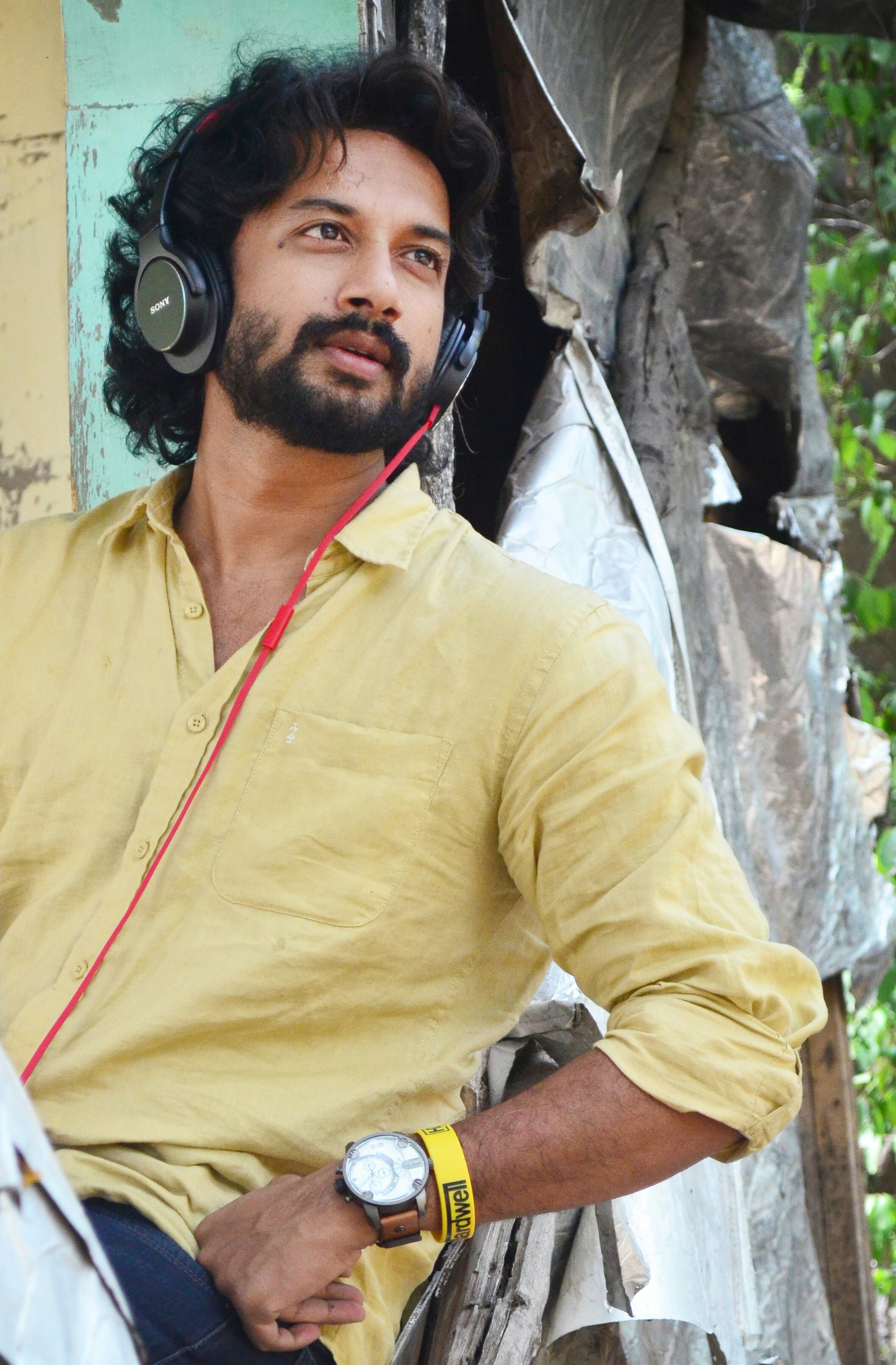
- The 2026 recipient: Satyadev
- Awarded for: Best Performance by an Actor in a Supporting Role in Telugu cinema
- Country: India
- Presented by: Vibri Media Group
- First award: 21 June 2012 (for films released in 2011)
- Most recent winner: Satyadev, Kingdom (2025)

Highlights
- Most wins: Rajendra Prasad (3)
- Most nominations: Rajendra Prasad (6)

SIIMA Award for Best Supporting Actor – Telugu is presented by Vibri media group as part of its annual South Indian International Movie Awards, for the best acting done by an actor in a supporting role in Telugu films. The award was first given in 2012 for films released in 2011. Rajendra Prasad is the most nominated with six nominations and most awarded with three wins.

== Superlatives ==
Categories	Recipient	Notes
Most wins	Rajendra Prasad	3
Most nominations	Rajendra Prasad	6
Most consecutive nominations	Prakash Raj	4 (2011–2014)
Most nominations without a win	Muralidhar Goud	3
Most nominations without a win	Naresh	3
Most nominations without a win	Rao Ramesh	3
Oldest winner	Amitabh Bachchan	Age 82 (13th SIIMA)
Youngest winner	Dheekshith Shetty	Age 28 (12th SIIMA)
Oldest nominee	Akkineni Nageswara Rao	Age 88 (1st SIIMA)
Youngest nominee	Dheekshith Shetty	Age 28 (12th SIIMA)

== Winners ==
Year	Actor	Film	Ref
2011	Prakash Raj	Dookudu	
2012	Rajendra Prasad	Julayi	
2013	Sunil	Tadakha	
2014	Srinivas Avasarala	Oohalu Gusagusalade	
2015	Rajendra Prasad	Srimanthudu	
2016	Srikanth	Sarrainodu	
2017	Aadhi Pinisetty	Ninnu Kori	
2018	Rajendra Prasad	Mahanati	
2019	Allari Naresh	Maharshi	
2020	Murali Sharma	Ala Vaikunthapurramuloo	
2021	Jagadeesh Prathap Bandari	Pushpa: The Rise	
2022	Rana Daggubati	Bheemla Nayak	
2023	Dheekshith Shetty	Dasara	
2024	Amitabh Bachchan	Kalki 2898 AD	
2025	Satyadev	Kingdom	

== Nominations ==
- 2011: Prakash Raj – Dookudu
  - Akkineni Nageswara Rao – Sri Rama Rajyam
  - Ashish Vidyarthi – Ala Modalaindi
  - Srihari – Aha Naa Pellanta
  - Annie – Rajanna
- 2012: Rajendra Prasad – Julayi
  - Prakash Raj – Dhamarukam
  - Kota Srinivasa Rao – Krishnam Vande Jagadgurum
  - Ajay – Ishq
  - Nassar – Businessman
- 2013: Sunil – Tadakha
  - Prakash Raj – Seethamma Vakitlo Sirimalle Chettu
  - Sathyaraj – Mirchi
  - Madhunandan – Gunde Jaari Gallanthayyinde
  - Boman Irani – Attarintiki Daredi
- 2014: Srinivas Avasarala – Oohalu Gusagusalade
  - Srikanth – Govindudu Andarivadele
  - Ajay – Dikkulu Choodaku Ramayya
  - Prakash Raj – Govindudu Andarivadele
  - Srinivasa Reddy – Geethanjali
- 2015: Rajendra Prasad – Srimanthudu
  - Jagapathi Babu – Srimanthudu
  - Posani Krishna Murali – Temper
  - Sathyaraj – Baahubali: The Beginning
  - Upendra – S/O Satyamurthy
- 2016: Srikanth – Sarrainodu
  - Mohanlal – Janatha Garage
  - Nara Rohith – Appatlo Okadundevadu
  - Rajendra Prasad – Supreme
  - Satyam Rajesh – Kshanam
- 2017: Aadhi Pinisetty – Ninnu Kori
  - Kay Kay Menon – Ghazi
  - Prakash Raj – Sathamanam Bhavati
  - Sathyaraj – Baahubali 2: The Conclusion
  - Sree Vishnu – Vunnadhi Okate Zindagi
- 2018: Rajendra Prasad – Mahanati
  - Aadhi Pinisetty – Rangasthalam
  - Murali Sharma – Vijetha
  - Naresh – Sammohanam
  - Ramki – RX 100
- 2019: Allari Naresh – Maharshi
  - Rao Ramesh – Prati Roju Pandage
  - Rajendra Prasad – Oh! Baby
  - Atharvaa – Gaddalakonda Ganesh
  - Suhas – Majili
- 2020: Murali Sharma – Ala Vaikunthapurramuloo
  - Rajendra Prasad – Sarileru Neekevvaru
  - Naresh – Uma Maheswara Ugra Roopasya
  - Rao Ramesh – Solo Brathuke So Better
  - Thiruveer – Palasa 1978
- 2021: Jagadeesh Prathap Bandari – Pushpa: The Rise
  - Rahul Ramakrishna – Jathi Ratnalu
  - P. Sai Kumar – SR Kalyanamandapam
  - Jagapathi Babu – Maha Samudram
  - Priyadarshi Pulikonda – Jathi Ratnalu
- 2022: Rana Daggubati – Bheemla Nayak
  - Muralidhar Goud – DJ Tillu
  - Naresh – Ante Sundaraniki
  - Rao Ramesh – Dhamaka
  - Sumanth – Sita Ramam
- 2023: Dheekshith Shetty – Dasara
  - Angad Bedi – Hi Nanna
  - Brahmanandam – Ranga Maarthaanda
  - Prithviraj Sukumaran – Salaar: Part 1 – Ceasefire
  - Ravi Krishna – Virupaksha
  - Viraj Ashwin – Baby
- 2024: Amitabh Bachchan – Kalki 2898 AD
  - Allari Naresh – Naa Saami Ranga
  - Muralidhar Goud – Tillu Square
  - Ramki – Lucky Baskhar
  - P. Sai Kumar – Saripodhaa Sanivaaram
- 2025: Satyadev – Kingdom
  - Jayaram – Mirai
  - Muralidhar Goud – Sankranthiki Vasthunam
  - Priyadarshi Pulikonda – Court: State vs a Nobody
  - Rajeev Kanakala – Little Hearts
  - Upendra – Andhra King Taluka

== See also ==
- SIIMA Award for Best Supporting Actress – Telugu
