= Anthaka Mundu Aa Tarvatha =

- Theatrical release poster
- Directed by: Mohan Krishna Indraganti
- Written by: Mohan Krishna Indraganti
- Produced by: K. L. Damodar Prasad
- Starring: Sumanth Ashwin; Eesha Rebba; Madhubala; Srinivas Avasarala; Ravi Babu; Rohini; Rao Ramesh
- Cinematography: P. G. Vinda
- Edited by: Marthand K. Venkatesh
- Music by: Kalyani Malik
- Production company: Sri Ranjith Movies
- Release date: 23 August 2013
- Running time: 151 minutes
- Country: India
- Language: Telugu
- Box office: ₹5 crore distributors' share

Anthaka Mundu Aa Tarvatha (transl. 'before it; after that'), also referred as AMAT, is a 2013 Indian Telugu-language romance film directed by Mohan Krishna Indraganti starring Sumanth Ashwin and debutante Eesha Rebba. Madhubala made a comeback with this film as Eesha's mother. The film was Nominated for Best film at the International Indian Film festival in South Africa.

The film was produced by K Damodara Prasad. Music was composed by Kalyani Koduri and cinematography is by P G Vinda. It released on 23 August 2013. The film, which deals with the dynamics of personal relationships before and after marriage, received highly positive critical acclaim and was a hit at the box office, completing a successful 50-day run on 16 October 2013.

== Plot ==
Anil does not want to settle for an arranged marriage. His mother Sujatha is keen to get him married and he decides to push off to Hyderabad, to escape from the pressure. He has the support of his father. In Hyderabad, he comes across Ananya (Eesha) and falls for her. Ananya is a painter and greeting cards designer who works for Latha. Anil starts wooing Ananya and she falls for his romantic charms. But Ananya is apprehensive about taking the relationship further. Her parents, Sridhar, a TV serial creative head and Vidhya, a yoga expert bitten by the acting bug, keep having arguments and this worries her. Anil sets up a company supplying flowers.

After Ananya expresses her apprehensions, Anil also has similar worries. "What if our relationship becomes boring and mundane after marriage?" is the question on their minds. They decide to have a secret live-in relationship, to see if they are compatible. They rent a flat for 2 months on the condition that they should not try to impress each other and should be themselves. Thus starts their life on an unsure note. One night, Ananya has food poisoning during her menstrual period and Anil, who can't stand people with ailments, after losing a heated argument with her, takes her to the hospital. After returning home, both argue again but reconcile the next morning. Anil and Ananya had sex the previous night and are worried about getting pregnant. Fortunately Ananya is found to be out of risk.

The next day, the couple have to babysit Latha's son as she has to depart to the U.S for an emergency. Though they find it initially hard, they get along with the child after a few days. This happens to continue for weeks and Ananya is annoyed as Anil ignores her as he is indulged in the baby's care. As Ananya is about to leave for Mumbai for a painting exhibition for a week, she learns that her mother is going to divorce her father after winning an award for Best Vamp in a serial aired in Sridhar's rival channel. After Latha returns, Anil vacates the flat when Ananya tells him she wants to put a stop to their live-in relationship. Meanwhile, Anil's father learns about the betrayal done to him by Sujatha before their marriage which he shares with Anil.

Anil's father loved Shyamala but their marriage was opposed by Anil's grandparents. By that time Sujatha, who was in love with Anil's father coerced Shyamala and her family to leave town, paving way for their marriage. Now Shyamala is in a hospital in Hyderabad and the duo goes to the hospital and are shocked to find out that the donor of the required liver tissue is Sujatha. She did it as an act of repentance for the sin of separating them, raising her level of respect and love in the hearts of her husband and son. On the other hand, Sridhar is filled with sorrow as Vidya left him but to the surprise of Sridhar and Ananya, Vidya returns the next morning after hearing about Anil's life with Ananya in the past 2 months. After gaining acceptance from both families, an emotional Ananya reconciles with Anil.

== Cast ==
- Sumanth Ashwin as Anil
- Eesha Rebba as Ananya
- Madhoo as Vidhya
- Ravi Babu as Sridhar
- Rao Ramesh as Anil's father
- Rohini as Sujatha
- Srinivas Avasarala as Anil's friend
- Thagubothu Ramesh as Retail Seller
- Pragathi as Shyamala
- Jhansi as Latha
- Sudeepa Pinky as Anil's friend wife
- Uppalapati Narayana Rao as Rohit's father
- Syed Sohel as Rohit (uncredited role), Anil's office worker

== Soundtrack ==
Anthaka Mundu Aa Tarvatha

Soundtrack album by Kalyani Koduri
- Released: 30 May 2013
- Recorded: 2013
- Genre: Feature film soundtrack
- Length: 27:15
- Language: Telugu
- Label: Madhura Audio
- Producer: Kalyani Koduri

Kalyani Koduri chronology
Adhinayakudu (2012)	Anthaka Mundu Aa Tarvatha (2013)	Oohalu Gusagusalade (2014)

Kalyani Koduri composed the Music for the film. The audio was launched on 30 May 2013 in Hyderabad and received positive response from both critics and audience alike.

Track listing
No.	Title	Lyrics	Artist(s)	Length
1.	"Gammattuga Unnadi"	Sirivennela Sitaramasastri	Hemachandra, Koganti Deepthi	4:14
2.	"Hey Kanipettey"	Anantha Sreeram	Kaala Bhairava, Sravanthi	3:16
3.	"Thene Mullula"	Sirivennela Sitaramasastri	Kalyani Koduri, Sravanthi	3:54
4.	"Nenena Aa Nenena"	Sirivennela Sitaramasastri	Sri Krishna, Sunitha	3:51
5.	"Thamari Thone"	Anantha Sreeram	Kalyani Koduri, Sunitha	4:08
6.	"Ye Inti Ammayive"	Anantha Sreeram	Hemachandra	4:34
7.	"Naa Anuragam"	Indraganti Srikantha Sharma	Kalyani Koduri, Prashanthi Tipirneni	3:18
Total length:				27:15

== Reception ==
Anthaka Mundu Aa Tarvatha received positive reviews from critics.

Karthik P of The Times of India gave a review stating "Good old fashioned, syrupy, well intentioned romance - that is free of innuendos and double entendres i.e. - has become a rarity in Tollywood off late. This movie offers a surfeit of such moments. The movie offers plenty of mushy, puppy love moments that could make you go awww, so watch it for the romance quotient" and rated the film 3.5/5. Sandeep Atreysa of Deccan Chronicle gave a review stating "A mid a spate of films that are trying to wipe out the thin line between love and lust, romance and sex, the Sumanth Ashwin and debutante Eesha starrer Anthaku Mundu Aa Tharvatha is like a breath of fresh air. Only if the director had avoided a predictable plot, the slow pace and sizeable melodrama, the film would have been a classic" and rated the film 2.5. Ravi Kandala of fullhyderabad.com gave a review stating "For all the candyfloss or vulgar romances that we get in the name of youth love stories, AMAT is a clean, mature, well-written film that raises some serious questions and even attempts to answer them" and rated the film 7/10. Nagaraj Goud of The Hans India gave a review stating "A refreshing drama that offers a slice of life, it's an Indraganti film from start to end - the way he handled the story, the way he extracted the performances and not to forget his cheesy one-liners, here is a filmmaker who is unperturbed by what is going around him and has the dare to experiment" and rated the film 3.5. Shekar of Oneindia Entertainment gave a review stating "Anthaka Mundu Aa Tarvatha is a wonderful romantic movie, which not only entertains you, but also makes you think. It is a must watch film. Don't miss it" and rated the film 3.5/5. A reviewer of APHerald.com gave a review stating "Anthaku Mundu Aa Tharuvatha is one film which offers different type of entertainment to the audience in the days of commercial entertainers. Camera work is good too but background music is exceptionally brilliant. The title of the film is apt-it's a delicious mix of love, humour and romance— all folded in a quit love story. Go grab it" and rated the film 3/5. Mahesh Koneru of 123telugu.com gave a review stating "Anthaka Mundu Aa Tarvatha is a clean, thoughtful and warm love story. There is a lot of tenderness in the first half and youngsters will connect to it well. The movie is not without its flaws. But classy performances, witty dialogues and some thought provoking sequences end up making AMAT a good watch" and rated the film 3.25/5. Jeevi of idlebrain.com gave a review stating "Director Mohana Krishna Indraganti who is known for Teluguness and sensibilities has chosen another subject which most of the commercial filmmakers shy away from making. I am giving 3.25 for this film as it's a good attempt to make a clean and mature film" and rated the film 3.25/5. Srivathsan Nadadhur of Cinegoer.net gave a review stating "AMAT as a film balances all departments adequately, is engaging and consciously respects the intelligence of a viewer. A worthy watch, in fact, the best in the recent past" and rated the film 3.75/5.
