= Phalana Abbayi Phalana Ammayi =

- Theatrical release poster
- Directed by: Srinivas Avasarala
- Written by: Srinivas Avasarala
- Produced by: T. G. Vishwa Prasad; Padmaja Dasari
- Starring: Naga Shaurya; Malvika Nair
- Cinematography: Sunil Kumar Nama
- Edited by: Kiran Ganti
- Music by: Kalyani Malik
- Production company: People Media Factory
- Release date: 17 March 2023
- Country: India
- Language: Telugu

Phalana Abbayi Phalana Ammayi (transl. Some Guy, Some Girl) is a 2023 Indian Telugu-language romantic comedy film written and directed by Srinivas Avasarala and starring Naga Shaurya and Malvika Nair in the lead roles. The film was released on 17 March 2023 to mixed-to-positive reviews from critics and audience, and was a box-office disappointment.

== Plot ==
Sanjay and Anupama meet each other in College. Sanjay is Anupama's junior in College. They begin to develop a special bond with each other. They start living together after leaving the college. But later on suddenly they break up. Ten years later, Sanjay runs his own restaurant in London, one day he meets Anupama. Anupama says that She is there because her sister has brought an alliance for her. After a while the groom comes to the restaurant and then she ends the conversation with a bye to him. Anupama asks Sanjay to go to his house. After a while, when Anu gets her bag to leave home, she notices all the objects around, which reminds her of the moments that happened 10 years ago. Next day, Sanjay finds his walkie talkie missing.He goes to Anu's house and finds her leaving to India.Anu Sees him and catches a bus trying to escape from Sanjay. But Sanjay manages to get into the bus And he says that he couldn't bear that Anu has found a lump as his mother was suffering with cancer. After hearing these words, Anupama and Sanjay reminisce there memories and ends the movie.

== Cast ==
- Naga Shaurya as Sanjay Pisapati
- Malvika Nair as Anupama Kasturi
- Srinivas Avasarala as Giri
- Megha Chowdhury as Pooja
- Ashok Kumar
- Abhishek Maharshi as Valentine Rao, Sanjay’s bestfriend
- Sri Vidhya Maharshi as Keerthi, Anupama’s bestfriend
- Varanasi Soumya Chalamcharla as Anupama's sister
- Harini Rao as Neelima Ratnababu
- Alexandra Taylor as Valentine Rao’s love interest
- Arjun Prasad

== Music ==
Music was done by Kalyani Malik.

== Release and reception ==
The film was released on 17 March 2023. The film received mixed to positive reviews. It began streaming on Sun NXT on 7 May 2023.
