= Cricket Girls & Beer =

2011 Indian Telugu-language film

- Official poster
- Directed by: S. Umesh Kumar
- Produced by: S. Sunitha
- Starring: Aadarsh Balakrishna; Surya Tej; Naga Shaurya; Sindhu Affan
- Music by: Shyam; Das
- Release date: 30 September 2011
- Country: India
- Language: Telugu

Cricket Girls & Beer is a 2011 Indian Telugu-language coming-of-age film directed by Umesh Kumar and starring newcomers Aadarsh Balakrishna, Surya Tej, Naga Shaurya, and Sindhu Affan.

== Cast ==
- Aadarsh Balakrishna as Vijay
- Surya Tej as Vivek
- Naga Shaurya as Vikram
- Sindhu Affan as Swapna
- M. S. Narayana
- Surya
- Rajitha
- Vinod Kumar Alva
- Siva Reddy
- Raja Sridhar
- Narasimha Raju

== Production ==
This is the second venture of Umesh Kumar, who previously directed Circus Circus (2009). The film is set in a college campus and features several new faces including cricketer Aadarsh Balakrishna and Surya Tej, who played a supporting role in Vinayakudu.

== Soundtrack ==
Music by Das and Shyam Vai.

Track listing
No.	Title	Lyrics	Singer(s)	Length
1.	"Happy Happy Sangeethalu"	Satish Banala	Karthik	4:07
2.	"Mayrupye Mayresena"	Satish Banala	Karthik Nagarajan	4:52
3.	"Shatruvai Yadhuta Inlluchuna"	Satish Banala	Shankar Mahadevan	5:04
4.	"Ra Ra Rajakumara"	Satish Banala	Suchitra	4:56
5.	"Gunday Chattu Badhey"	Satish Banala	Sonu Nigam	5:48
6.	"Cricket Girls And Beer"	Satish Banala	Abhishek, Vicky	3:20
Total length:				28:07

== Release and reception ==
The film was scheduled to release on 27 September, but was postponed to 30 September. Y. Sunitha Chowdhury of The Hindu opined that "He [Adarsh Balakrishna] and Surya Tej are resolutely superficial, Naga Shourya should try and be an original instead of imitating Prabhas and Mahesh Babu". A critic from Full Hyderabad opined that "In sum, this is a film that will not have takers even among TV channels".
