= Bad Boy Karthik =

2026 film directed by Ramesh Desina

- Theatrical release poster
- Directed by: Ramesh Desina
- Produced by: Srinivasa Rao Chinthlapudi; Vijaya Kumar Chinthalapudi; Dr. Ashok Kumar Chinthalapudi
- Starring: Naga Shaurya; Vidhi Yadav; Samuthirakani
- Cinematography: Rasool Ellore
- Edited by: Kotagiri Venkateswara Rao
- Music by: Harris Jayaraj
- Production company: Sri Vaishnavi Films
- Distributed by: Zee Studios
- Release date: 17 April 2026
- Running time: 141 minutes
- Country: India
- Language: Telugu

Bad Boy Karthik is a 2026 Indian Telugu-language action comedy film written and directed by Ramesh Desina in his directorial debut. The film stars Naga Shaurya, Vidhi Yadav and Samuthirakani.

The film was tentatively titled NS24, it is Shaurya's 24th film in a leading role. Later, the official film title was announced. The film was released on 17 April 2026. It was panned by critics and emerged as a box-office disaster.

== Plot ==
Karthik, a rebellious troublemaker, finds himself in a violent clash with a group of local criminals. Meanwhile, he must confront the gang to ensure the safety of his family.

== Cast ==
- Naga Shaurya as Karthik
- Vidhi Yadav as Meera
- Samuthirakani as Varadha Reddy
- Naresh as Shiva
- Saikumar as Prakash
- Vennela Kishore as Sidappa
- Sridevi Vijayakumar as Kasturi
- Ajay as Kasturi's husband
- Mime Gopi as Govindappa
- Brahmaji as Arilova Seenu
- Krishnudu
- Chammak Chandra
- Vamsi Raghava Yenumula as IAS Officer
- Mahaboob Basha
- Satish Saripalli as Lawyer
- Sneha Gupta (special appearance in the song "America Nundi Vacchaanu")

== Music ==
The film's music was composed by Harris Jayaraj. The audio rights were acquired by T Series.

Bad Boy Karthik

Soundtrack album by Harris Jayaraj
- Released: 2026
- Recorded: 2025
- Studio: Annapurna Studios
- Genre: Soundtrack
- Length: 21:55
- Label: T-Series
- Producer: Harris Jayaraj

Harris Jayaraj chronology
Kadhal Reset Repeat (2026)	Bad Boy Karthik (2026)

Track listing
No.	Title	Lyrics	Singer(s)	Length
1.	"My Dear Janathaa"	Ramajogayya Sastry	Hemachandra	3:34
2.	"Andhamaina Figaru Nuvvaa"	Krishna Kanth	Sridhar Sena, Priya Jerson	4:22
3.	"Naa Maava Pillanitthaanannade"	Kasarla Shyam	N. C. Karunya, Haripriya	3:23
4.	"Pommante"	Chandrabose	Vijay Yesudas, Shakthisree Gopalan	5:02
5.	"America Nundi Vacchaanu"	Chandrabose	Chandana Bala Kalyan, Gold Devaraj	3:24

== Release ==
Bad Boy Karthik was released on 17 April 2026. The film was distributed by Zee Studios.

== Reception ==
Bad Boy Karthik received negative reviews from critics.

Shreya Varanasi of The Times of India rated the film 2 out of 5 and wrote that, "Bad Boy Karthik feels like something you've seen many times before". A crtic of Telugucinema.com rated it 1.75 out 5 and called it a "bad film from start to finish". Sakshi Post rated it 1.5 out of 5 called it "disappointing and outdated" due to weak writing. Satya Pulagam of ABP Desam rated it 1 out of 5.
