= Lakshmi Raave Maa Intiki =

- Poster
- Directed by: Nandyala Ravi
- Written by: Nandyala Ravi
- Produced by: M. Giridhar
- Starring: Naga Shaurya; Avika Gor
- Cinematography: Sai Sriram
- Edited by: Ramanjaneyulu
- Music by: Radha Krishna
- Release date: 5 December 2014
- Country: India
- Language: Telugu

Lakshmi Raave Maa Intiki (transl. Come into our home, Lakshmi) is a 2014 Telugu-language romantic drama film directed by Nandyala Ravi. The film stars Naga Shaurya and Avika Gor with Rao Ramesh in a pivotal role.It recorded as flop both critically and commercially.

== Cast ==
- Naga Shaurya as Sai Prasad
- Avika Gor as Lakshmi
- Rao Ramesh as Sarvesh Anand Rao, a town planner and Lakshmi's father
- Naresh as Sai's father
- Pavitra Lokesh as Anand Rao’s lover
- Saptagiri as Sai's assistant and friend
- Pragathi as Sai's mother
- Satyam Rajesh
- Vennela Kishore as Software Subramanyam
- Venu Yeldandi
- Vidya Rao

== Production ==
As of May 2014, most of the shoot had been completed. The second schedule of the film was shot in Hyderabad. The songs were shot in Coorg and Puducherry. In addition to Shaurya and Gor, Rao Ramesh, Naresh, Sapthagiri and Satyam Rajesh were revealed to be part of the film.

== Soundtrack ==
Soundtrack was composed by K. M. Radha Krishnan.

- "Devatalle" - K. M. Radha Krishnan
- "Katuka Diddina" - Hemachandra
- "Aa Venneladaina" - Karthik, Sunitha
- "Entha Sogasu" - Gayatri Narayan
- "Raave Maa" - Deepu
- "Manasulo" - Srikrishna
- "Amma Kadupu" - Sridevi
- "Venu Gaana" - Sunitha

== Reception ==
The Times of India gave this film two out of five stars and wrote that "There are films which bore you to death and then, there are films which aim too high and fall flat, but this one makes you wonder if the actors and the director, were as clueless as the audience is". The Hindu stated that "The convoluted screenplay will make you look towards the exit door".
