= Ammammagarillu =

2018 Indian film

- Theatrical release poster
- Directed by: Sundar Surya
- Written by: Sundar Surya
- Produced by: Rajesh
- Starring: Naga Shaurya; Shamili
- Cinematography: Rasool Ellore
- Edited by: J. P.
- Music by: Kalyan Koduri
- Production company: Swajith Movies
- Release date: 25 May 2018
- Running time: 156 minutes
- Country: India
- Language: Telugu

Ammammagarillu (transl. Maternal grandmother's home) is a 2018 Telugu comedy drama film directed by Sundar Surya. The film stars Naga Shaurya and Shamili with Sumithra as the grandmother (ammamma).

== Plot ==
Twenty years ago the family of Ravi Babu (Rao Ramesh) and his brother in law (Suman) split. Santosh (Naga Shaurya), the son of Suman who loves his Ammamma Seetha Maha Lakshmi (Sumithra) very much, makes it his personal mission to bring the family closer in 20 days. At the same time, Seetha Maha Lakshmi decides to distribute her property, and invites all the family members to her village.

== Cast ==
- Naga Shaurya as Santhosh
- Shamili as Sita, Santhosh's maradalu (cousin)
- Sumithra as Sita Mahalakshmi, Santosh's ammamma (grandmother)
- Rao Ramesh as P.K. Babu Rao, Santhosh's uncle
- Chalapathi Rao as Santhosh's grandfather
- Sudha
- Posani Krishna Murali as Yadagiri
- Hema
- Ravi Prakash as Ravi, Santhosh's uncle
- Sivaji Raja
- Madhumani
- Gautam Raju
- Shakalaka Shankar as Santhosh's friend
- Suman as Santhosh's father
- Rupa Lakshmi

== Production ==
The film was shot at Ramoji Film City.

== Soundtrack ==
Ammammagarillu

Soundtrack album by Kalyan Koduri
- Released: 2018
- Recorded: 2018
- Genre: Soundtrack
- Length: 29:53
- Label: Aditya Music
- Producer: Kalyan Koduri

Kalyan Koduri chronology
Jyo Achyutananda (2016)	Ammammagarillu (2018)	Lakshmi's NTR (2019)

All music is composed by Kalyana Ramana

Track list
No.	Title	Lyrics	Singer(s)	Length
1.	"Chala Chala"	Bhaskarabhatla	Kalyana Ramana, Geetha Madhuri	4:11
2.	"Ammammagarillu"	Sirivennela Seetharama Sastry	S. P. Balasubrahmanyam	4:15
Total length:				8:26

== Release and reception ==
The Times of India gave the film two and a half stars out of five and wrote: "Go watch this one this weekend if you cherished the memories you made at ammamma’s home during the summers. But if real life holds enough family politics for you, give this one a cold hard miss". The Hindu noted that "With lazy acting by everybody and poor story development, there is no high point in the film and not a single scene that makes for a compelling watch".

In 2019, the film was dubbed into Hindi as Naani Maa. The Hindi version saw a positive response as the film reached 11 million views in two days and was ranked number two on trending.

== Home media ==
The film is available on Sun NXT platform and broadcasting rights acquired by Gemini TV.

== See also ==
- Sathamanam Bhavati
- Prati Roju Pandage
