= Lakshmi's NTR =

2019 Telugu-language film

- Directed by: Ram Gopal Varma; Agasthya Manju
- Written by: Ram Gopal Varma; Narendra Chary
- Produced by: Rakesh Reddy; Deepthi Balagiri
- Starring: J.K.Vijay Kumar; Yagna Shetty; Sritej
- Cinematography: Rammy
- Edited by: Ballu Saluja
- Music by: Kalyani Malik
- Production company: GV Films
- Distributed by: NH Studioz
- Release date: 29 March 2019
- Running time: 152 minutes
- Country: India
- Language: Telugu
- Budget: ₹2.5 crore
- Box office: est. ₹7 crore

Lakshmi's NTR is a 2019 Indian Telugu-language biographical drama film based on the life of former film actor and chief minister of undivided Andhra Pradesh, N. T. Rama Rao from the perspective of his second wife, Lakshmi Parvati as well as Rao during his last days. It is co-directed by Ram Gopal Varma, and Agasthya Manju.

== Cast ==
- P Vijay Kumar as N. T. Rama Rao
- Yagna Shetty as Lakshmi Parvathi
- Sritej as Nara Chandrababu Naidu
- Aningi Rajasekhar as Rama Subba Reddy
- Vj Balu as Balakrishna
- Swarnakanth as Devineni Nehru

== Production ==
On 4 July 2017, RGV announced through his YouTube channel that he would be directing NTR's biopic with the title RGV's NTR, in which Nandamuri Balakrishna was to act. Due to differences they both did two different movies on NTR. The film's title was later changed to Lakshmi's NTR.

=== Casting ===
After various speculation and rumours as to who would be cast in the lead roles, it was revealed that P Vijay Kumar as N. T. Rama Rao, Sritej as Nara Chandrababu Naidu and Yagna Shetty as Lakshmi Parvathi would reprise their roles.

== Soundtrack ==
Lakshmi's NTR

Soundtrack album by Kalyani Malik
- Released: 2019
- Recorded: 2018
- Genre: Soundtrack
- Label: Mango Music
- Producer: Kalyani Malik

Kalyani Malik chronology
Ammammagarillu (2018)	Lakshmi's NTR (2019)

Music is composed by Kalyani Malik and released on Mango Music label.

Track list
No.	Title	Lyrics	Singer(s)	Length
1.	"Vennupotu"	Sira Sri	Kalyani Malik	03:16
2.	"Endhuku"	Sira Sri	Kalyani Malik, Sri Krishna	04:54
3.	"Nee Uniki"	Sira Sri	S. P. Balasubrahmanyam	02:12
4.	"Avasaram"	Sira Sri	Wilson Herald	02:06
5.	"Garjana"	Sira Sri	P. Ravi Shankar	02:29
6.	"Vijayam"	Sira Sri	S. P. Balasubrahmanyam, Mohana Bhogaraju	01:36
7.	"Nenem Chesano"	Sira Sri	Uma Neha	02:01
8.	"Gelupu Votami"	Sira Sri	Shweta Mohan	06:43
9.	"Sisiraniki"	Sira Sri	Kalyani Malik, Chinmayi	03:56

== Release ==
Initially it was scheduled to release on 22 March 2019. There are many political pressures on Election Commission and Central Board of Film Certification (CBFC) to stop the release of the movie in the mode of the conduct basis. As RGV fought back against the EC and CBFC, the petitions against the release of the movie were filed in the Telangana High Court. The HC after a thorough inquiry, directed that every individual has the right to express his feelings so the release of the movie cannot be stopped. Due to some Post production and Pre-release formalities it was rescheduled to release on 29 March 2019 in Telangana and on 1 June in Andhra Pradesh. 'Weekend Cinema' released the movie overseas.

=== Marketing ===
First track ‘Vennupotu’(Backstabbing) was released on 21 December 2018, which went on to make controversies. A case was filed by TDP MLA from Pithapuram S V S N Varma saying that it was aiming at Chief Minister of Andhra Pradesh Nara Chandra Babu Naidu. So the High Court issued notices to censor board and producer of Lakshmi's NTR.

The second track ‘Enduku’(Why?) was released on 8 January 2019, questioning why did NTR marry Lakshmi Parvathi.

On 18 January 2019, A teaser was released which gives a brief glance into the characters.

First official trailer was released on 14 February 2019, at 9:27 AM by Ram Gopal Varma on Valentine's Day signifying the love between NTR and Lakhsmi Parvathi.

=== Home media ===
After the release of the trailer, a big Telugu channel acquired the satellite rights for ₹3 Crore.

== Reception ==
=== Critical reception ===
Cinema Express gave 3 out of 5 stars stating "Lakshmi's NTR, which traverses the unexplored events that happened in the life of NTR, makes for an interesting watch".

Firstpost gave 2.5 out of 5 stars stating "Lakshmi's NTR ends up being yet another drama from RGV's factory which doesn't pack a punch despite its inherent drama".

The Times of India gave 2.5 out of 5 stars stating "Lakshmi's NTR does tell the story of an important and less talked about phase in the legendary actor-politician's life. But a good story doesn't always make for a good film".

Sify gave 2.5 out of 5 stars stating "Lakshmi's NTR that focused on later life of legendary actor and politician late NT Rama Rao is fairly faithful to the political events of 1989 to 1996. While the film paints Chandrababu Naidu as a villain in NTR's life, it also goes extra length to show Lakshmi Parvathi as a woman sans blemishes. It is an okay political movie with slow narration".

The Indian Express gave 1 out of 5 stars stating "Ram Gopal Varma needs to cultivate new tricks of storytelling, should he ever aspire to make a decent film again".
