= Vaaraahi Chalana Chitram =

Indian film production house

- Industry: Entertainment
- Headquarters: India
- Key people: Sai Korrapati
- Products: Films
- Owner: Sai Korrapati

Vaaraahi Chalana Chitram (transl. Vaaraahi Motion Pictures) is an Indian film production house that produces Telugu films. It was established by Sai Korrapati.

== Film production ==
Year	Film	Director	Notes
2012	Eega	S. S. Rajamouli	
2012	Andala Rakshasi	Hanu Raghavapudi	Co-produced with S. S. Rajamouli
2014	Legend	Boyapati Srinu	Co-produced with 14 Reels Entertainment
2014	Oohalu Gusagusalade	Srinivas Avasarala	
2014	Dikkulu Choodaku Ramayya	Trikoti	
2015	Tungabhadra	Srinivasa Krishna	
2015	Raju Gari Gadhi	Ohmkar	Co-produced with AK Entertainments and OAK Entertainments
2015	Jatha Kalise	Rakesh Sashii	Co-produced with OAK Entertainments and Yukta Creations
2016	Raja Cheyyi Vesthe	Pradeep Chilukuri	
2016	Manamantha	Chandra Sekhar Yeleti	
2016	Jyo Achyutananda	Srinivas Avasarala	
2017	Patel S. I. R.	Vasu Parimi	
2017	Rendu Rellu Aaru	Nandu	
2017	Yuddham Sharanam	Krishna Marimuthu	
2018	Vijetha	Rakesh Sashii	
2019	NTR: Kathanayakudu	Radha Krishna Jagarlamudi	Co-produced with NBK Films and Vibri Media
2019	NTR: Mahanayakudu	Radha Krishna Jagarlamudi	Co-produced with NBK Films and Vibri Media
2021	Thellavarithe Guruvaram	Manikanth Gelli	Co-produced with Loukya Entertainments
2022	Bhala Thandanana	Chaitanya Dantluri	
2023	Ustaad	Phanideep	
2025	Junior	Radha Krishna Reddy	Also shot in Kannada

=== Films distribution ===
Year	Film	Director	Notes
2018	KGF: Chapter 1	Prashanth Neel	Co-produced with Hombale Films
2019	Pailwaan	S. Krishna	co-produced with RRR Motion Pictures
2022	KGF: Chapter 2	Prashanth Neel	Co-produced with Hombale Films
2025	Baahubali: The Epic	S.S. Rajamouli	Co-produced with Arka Mediaworks

== Awards ==
Ceremony	Category	Nominee	Result
National Film Awards	Best Feature Film Telugu	Eega	Won
Filmfare Awards	Best Film Award (Telugu)	Eega	Won
South Indian International Movie Awards	Best Film (Telugu)	Eega	Won
CineMAA Awards	Family Entertainer of the Year	Eega	Won
8th Toronto After Dark Film Festival	Best Action Film	Eega	Won
