= Jyo Achyutananda =

- Theatrical poster
- Directed by: Srinivas Avasarala
- Written by: Srinivas Avasarala
- Produced by: Sai Korrapati
- Starring: Nara Rohit; Naga Shourya; Regina Cassandra
- Cinematography: Venkat Dilip Chunduru
- Edited by: Kiran Ganti
- Music by: Kalyan Koduri
- Production company: Varahi Chalana Chitram
- Release date: 9 September 2016
- Running time: 125 minutes
- Country: India
- Language: Telugu

Jyo Achyutananda is a 2016 Indian Telugu-language comedy drama film directed by Srinivas Avasarala and produced by Sai Korrapati on Varahi Chalana Chitram. It stars Nara Rohit, Naga Shourya and Regina Cassandra. The plot follows two brothers—Achyuth (Rohit) and Ananda (Shaurya)—who fall in love with their neighbour Jyo (Cassandra).

The film was released worldwide on 9 September 2016. The film gained positive reviews from critics, who praised the film's first half as opposed to its second half. The film had a good opening at the box office.

== Plot ==
Achyuta Rama Rao "Achyuth" and Ananda Vardan Rao "Anand" are brothers, and one is an HRM, and another one is a medical representative. Though not in good terms amongst themselves because of ego issues, they act as caring brothers in front of others. One day, Achyuth gives a party for buying a new car with accumulated rent money he collected from Anand. This leads to a verbal altercation between Achyuth and Anand in the middle of which they blurt out in front of their wives that they had some issue with Jyothsna, the daughter of their elderly tenant Sudoku Moorthy who lives upstairs. After the party, both wives ask about Jyo, and then both the brothers lie that other brothers had wooed Jyo, leading to her getting exasperated at the brothers and leaving the house for higher studies. After that, they meet at their portico and remember their actual past regarding Jyo.

5 years ago, when the brothers had just completed their studies and were not yet employed, were on good terms, and their father was alive, Jyosthna Kumari "Jyo," a postgraduate dental student along with her father father Surya Narayana Murthy "Sudoku" Murthy rents the upstairs of their house. From day one, both the brothers had fallen for her. They both become jointly friends with her and both feel she reciprocates their feelings, and waits for a right opportunity to propose her. Anand decided to propose Jyo on his birthday and prepares a cheesy love letter. He confides in with Achyuth about this the night before and Achyuth encourages Anand to propose to her. Next day when Anand is about to propose Jyo she reveals that Achyuth had proposed her with a cheesy love letter (which Anand realises is a modified copy of his own letter) but she can't accept his proposal because she is in love with someone else. Jyo requests Anand to convince Achyuth to drop out. Anand, thinking that he is the "someone else" Jyo loves, tells Achyuth to back out. The brothers quarrel and decides to know who among them does Jyo like.

The next day, Jyo reveals that she is in love with her classmate Juvvala Bala Bharadwaj and has decided to pursue masters along with him in the US. Jyo is annoyed at the brothers for mistaking her friendship for romantic interest. She says she doesn't have any feelings on both of them and considers them as friends. But the brothers try to convince her to choose one of them, and then Jyo, annoyed, states that she is ending her friendship with them. Next day, an angered Achyuth burns Jyo's new passport without her knowledge. Jyo meets the brothers to reconcile and continue their friendship, and Anand, thinking it would be fine to convey the news of passport-burning to Jyo, conveys it to her timidly. Then Jyo lashes out on them and goes to meet their father to complain about their antics, but when she was about to complain to their father(Koteswara Rao), he falls down with a severe heart attack. The brothers suspect that Jyo telling something in anger to their father was the reason for their father's heart attack and intimidates her. Later, Jyo confesses all facts to her father, and then he manages the situation and sends her to the US for her further studies. Later, Koteswara Rao dies in the hospital. From then onwards Achyuth and Anand's relationship had started to drift apart and ego clash between Achyuth who is well off and Anand who is struggling financially, increased the gap between them.

Now "Sudoku," Murthy happily announces that her daughter is coming back after completing her studies, which are eyebrowed by Kalpana and Priya after looking at their brother-in-laws expressions. Jyo, after coming back home, understood the situation and decided to set it right. Later, at Achyuth's anniversary, Jyo encourages the brothers to show their talents in front of their wives. But knowing the reality, their talents are actually opposite to each other like Achyuth is a good painter, but telling about Jyo to his wife Kalpana, he portrayed himself as a good Tennis player vice-versa with Anand. So however comically they managed successfully with their wives, but they think positively about each other but their egos won't accept to start fresh.

One night, Jyo asks Achyuth for a migraine pill and suddenly proposes to him, which is viewed by Achyuth. Later, along with Anand, he tries to convince Jyo to drop out in the "Dialogue in the Dark" restaurant. Meanwhile, Kalpana and Priya unknowingly show grief on each other. So, to end this issue, the brothers decide to get her married with Anand's brother in law. In the engagement, Jyo denies the ring and confesses that she loves a guy who was already married, but he told her that he would divorce her and come back for Jyo when she loved, he was not married so she decided to wait for him. In the same night, the brothers realize that Jyo played the same trick on Anand and understood that they were tricked by Jyo and confronted her. Then Jyo asks for an explanation regarding their behavior towards her on their father's heart stroke incident. Then they apologized for their actions towards her and requested to forget all the incidents, but Jyo revealed that she got a breakup with Bharadwaj in the US because of his possessive nature. Later he started blackmailing her to reveal their love letters and gifts when she was in relationship with him to be with him. Then, to solve her problem, she blackmails them to get her love letters and gifts from Bharadwaj, who is currently in India, or else she will give their love letters written to her to their wives.

Then Achyuth pressurized Anand to get love letters and gifts by himself, but Anand doesn't show any interest in it, then angered Achyuth sales the book "Chivariki Migiledi" which their father had given before his death to Anand as a gift on his birthday. Then, Anand became furious and called a contractor to their home to verify for demolishing their house and turning into an apartments. After knowing this, Achyuth becomes angry and makes a quarrel with Anand, then their mother intervenes and make accept the proposal of the Anand to bifurcation. For Jyo's sake, the brothers decided to work together for the last time. Achyuth makes a plan to get the gifts of Jyo at Bharadwaj's home, and his plan miserably failed, the brothers are caught red-handed by Bharadwaj Then Achyuth escapes successful from Bharadwaj, but Anand had been caught by Bharadwaj with the gifts of Jyo, and to his disappointment, his brother didn't show up to rescue him while bashing him and sees it like a movie. However, with a hard struggle, Anand also successfully escapes from Bharadwaj with the gifts of Jyo. At the same night, Anand questions Achyuth, being an elder brother why he didn't come to rescue him when he was in danger then Achyuth gives a selfish reply which hurts Anand and decided to shift Bangalore and leave him forever. After that incident, Achyuth faces a dilemma with his consciousness questions about his actions towards his brother and feels guilty, and decides to set it right.

Later, Achyuth meets Bharadwaj and bashes him for beating his brother. Later in the railway station, Achyuth gives a send-off to Anand, who is going to Bangalore. There, Jyo pays a visit to thank them for helping her to solve her problem and questions, Achyuth had bashes Bharadwaj? Then Achyuth replied yes, then this answer made heard by Anand later Achyuth gives the book "Chivariki Migiledi" to Anand of their father's name in it, but Anand rejects by saying this is not their father's signature then Achyuth apologize for his foolish actions towards him and says he may failed as an elder brother but they must not fail as brothers. Then Anand becomes emotional, accepts his apologies, and believes him as his father figure. Anand decided not to go to Bangalore.

Meanwhile, observing from the far Jyo discusses with his new boyfriend that after observing the situation at home, she felt responsible regarding the situation and decided to set it right by observing Achyuth and Anand's mother and also solving her problem. She did not do anything, but she made them realize their love and effection on each other. Finally, the film ends with the brothers catching the running train to take the book "Chivariki Migiledi," which Achyuth had gifted to Anand.

== Cast ==
- Nara Rohit as Ainapurapu Achyuta "Achyuth" Rama Rao
- Naga Shourya as Ainapurapu Ananda "Anand" Vardhan Rao
- Regina Cassandra as Dr. Boggaram Jyothsna "Jyo" Kumari
- Tanikella Bharani as Boggaram Surya Narayana Murthi "Sudoku Murthi"
- Pavani Gangi Reddy as Kalpana 'Kalpu', Achyuth's wife
- Rajeshwari Pamidighantam as Priya, Anand's wife
- Ashok Kumar as Ainapurapu Koteswara Rao, Achyuth and Anand's father
- Seetha as Achyuth and Anand's mother
- Shashank as Juvvala Bala Bharadwaj
- Chaitanya Krishna as Anand's brother-in-law
- Mirchi Hemanth as Achyuth's employee.
- Sanjay Reddy as Jyothsna's cousin
- Nani as Jyo's new boyfriend (cameo)

== Production ==
This is the second film that Srinivas Avasarala directed after Oohalu Gusagusalade (2014), which also starred Naga Shourya.

== Themes and influences ==
The film's theme of brotherhood was compared to Seethamma Vakitlo Sirimalle Chettu (2013). However, the film offers a comical take on the subject largely devoid of unneeded sob scenes.

== Soundtrack ==
Jyo Achyutananda

Soundtrack album by Kalyan Koduri
- Released: 20 August 2016
- Recorded: 2016
- Genre: Soundtrack
- Length: 18:34
- Label: Vel Records
- Producer: Kalyan Koduri

Kalyan Koduri chronology
Kalyana Vaibhogame (2016)	Jyo Achyutananda (2016)	Ammammagarillu (2018)

The film's songs and background music are composed by Kalyan Koduri and all the lyrics are penned by Bhaskara Bhatla. This was the second collaboration between Koduri and Avasarala Srinivas after Oohalu Gusagusalade (2014).

Track list
No.	Title	Artist(s)	Length
1.	"Aakupachanni Chandamamala"	Karthik, Ramya Behara	3:53
2.	"Suvarna Suvarna"	Simha	3:59
3.	"Oka Lalana" (Male Version)	Shankar Mahadevan	4:18
4.	"Jyo Achuytananda"	Kalyan Koduri, Smitha	3:05
5.	"Oka Lalana" (Female Version)	Harini Rao	3:17
Total length:			18:34

== Reception ==
A critic from The Hindu rated the film 3.5/5 and wrote, "As promised, he [Avasarala] steers away from an expected romantic triangle and instead makes Jyo Achyutananda, a fulfilling emotional ride between two brothers". Krishna Vamsi of The Indian Express rated the film 3/5 and wrote, "The narrative is perfectly woven around the two brothers who push the story forward in repetitive yet enjoyable sequences. It has a perfectly penned down storyline which is eloquently presented by almost all the characters". Pranita Jonnalagedda of The Times of India gave the film the same rating and wrote, "Jyo Achyuthananda is the kind of film that will leave you with a good feeling. Riding high on emotions and relying on the performances of its actors, it is the eventual lack of clarity in narration does a wee bit of damage". Suresh Kavirayani of Deccan Chronicle wrote, "To sum up, Jyo Achyutananda is a good film with a hilarious first half. Though the second is a bit slow, but Srinivas Avasarala has managed to pull it off". Karthik Keramalu of News18 wrote, "Avasarala has given Rohit a bright film that the actor can feature in his resume. And, by adding the elements of a triangular love story to his script, he has unlocked the door of complexity".
