= Nee Jathaleka =

Indian Telugu-language romantic drama film

- Release poster
- Directed by: Lawerence Dasari
- Produced by: G.V.Chowdary; Nagaraj Goud Chirra
- Starring: Naga Shaurya; Parul Gulati; Sarayu
- Cinematography: Bujji K.
- Edited by: Nandamuri Hari
- Music by: Swaraj Jedidiah
- Production company: Sri Satya Vidhura Movies
- Release date: 1 October 2016
- Country: India
- Language: Telugu

Nee Jathaleka (transl. Without you by my side) is a 2016 Indian Telugu-language romantic drama film directed by Lawerence Dasari and starring Naga Shaurya, Parul Gulati and Sarayu. This was the first film Naga Shourya shot for and had a delayed release.

== Cast ==
- Naga Shaurya as Akhil
- Parul Gulati as Shirley
- Sarayu as Swapna

== Soundtrack ==
The music was composed by Swaraj Jedidiah. The songs were shot in Bangkok and Hyderabad. The title song was released in August on Radio City 91.1 FM.

== Release ==
The film was scheduled to release on 13 August 2016, but the release was pushed to 1 October.

== Reception ==
A critic from Nowrunning wrote that "Finally, Nee Jathaleka has ended up as a forgettable film for Naga Shourya due to the outdated story line, bad performances, and boring narration". A critic from 123Telugu wrote that "The outdated story line, bad performances, and boring narration kill this film completely".
