= Raja Cheyyi Vesthe =

- Theatrical release poster
- Directed by: Pradeep Chilukuri
- Written by: Pradeep Chilukuri
- Produced by: Sai Korrapati
- Starring: Nara Rohit; Taraka Ratna; Isha Talwar
- Cinematography: Samala Bhasker
- Music by: Sai Karthik
- Production company: Varahi Chalana Chitram
- Release date: 29 April 2016
- Country: India
- Language: Telugu

Raja Cheyyi Vesthe (transl. If The King Lays His Hands On It) is a 2016 Indian Telugu-language action thriller film directed by debutante Pradeep Chilukuri and produced by Sai Korrapati, under Varahi Chalana Chitram. The film stars Nara Rohit, Taraka Ratna and Isha Talwar in the lead roles. The film's title is based off the song of the same name from Vichitra Sodarulu (1989). It was dubbed into Hindi as Encounter Raja.

== Plot ==
Raja Ram (Nara Rohit) is an aspiring filmmaker who thinks to defeat the enemy not through muscle power but through brain power. He loves Chaitra (Isha Talwar), an orphan who has a secret motive and has no interest in him.

One day, Raja receives a message from a producer who is interested in making a film with him, but he puts some conditions on him; for example, he wants to kill gangster-turned-businessman Manik (Taraka Ratna). Raja is suspicious about the message and about the producer, whom he did not see. He thinks creatively and finds out that his police officer friend Subhash (Shashank) is behind the letter. Raja comes to know this and then finds out that Chaitra is the mastermind behind the entire plot. Chaitra tells her story to Raja.

When Chaitra was a kid, Manik killed her parents accidentally, apologized formally, and left. To avenge their deaths after having grown up, her brother Chakri (Srinivas Avasarala) tried to kill Manik. All attempts fail, and Manik catches Chakri, who dies brutally. After hearing Chaitra's story, Raja decides to help her and makes a plan to kill Manik. Meanwhile, Chaitra falls for Raja and accepts his love. Raja's mother decides to make arrangements for their wedding.

Meanwhile, in a private party, the honest SP (Sivaji Raja), who is working against Manik, was insulted by a minister who supports Manik, and Manik slaps him in front of everyone. Then at home, Manik observes a common point in his group photos (he found out Chakri and Chaitra's photos, along with him who is following him). He understands everything and decides to kill Chaitra. After the plan was leaked by one of his friends, Ravi (Ravi Varma), to Manik for a ransom, Manik tries to kill him, but Ravi tricks him and escapes with the money. However, he becomes loyal to Manik and tells him Raja's whereabouts. Later, it is revealed that Ravi is a loyal friend to Raja; actually, it is his plan to trap Manik. Then, Manik chases Chaitra to kill her. Raja rescues her, and a fight ensues between them in that area. With the help of his friends, Raja kills all his henchmen, and Manik kills his friend, a junior artist. Then, in a final combat, everyone gives the weapons to Raja in the fight with Manik, and Raja finally kills Manik. Police listed the case as pending, then it is revealed that Raja is the son of none other than the SP who was slapped by Manik and who supported him in the fight with Manik is who wants to take revenge on Manik for the death of their beloved.

Finally, the film ends with Raja starting to work in a direction department and aspiring to his dream.

== Cast ==
- Nara Rohit as Raja Ram
- Taraka Ratna as Manik
- Isha Talwar as Chaitra
- Srinivas Avasarala as Chakri
- Shashank as Subhash
- Sivaji Raja as SP
- Rajeev Kanakala as Chaitra's father
- Ravi Varma as Ravi
- Raghu Karumanchi as Raja Ram's friend
- Viva Harsha as Raja Ram's friend
- C. V. L. Narasimha Rao
- Sivannarayana Naripeddi as Church Father (cameo)

== Soundtrack ==
Yevare Nee Premaku - Dhanunjay
Kottu Kottu - Sai Charan, Sai Karthik, Shashaa Tirupathi
Neethone -Sai Charan, Sai Karthik
Chudara Itu Chudarathillu, Geethu, Swetha P, Jayaram P, Saatvik G, Sriya Madhuri
Chinnari Thalli - Shruthi
Raja Cheyyi Vesthe - Simha, Divija Karthik
