= Pragathi =

Indian actress

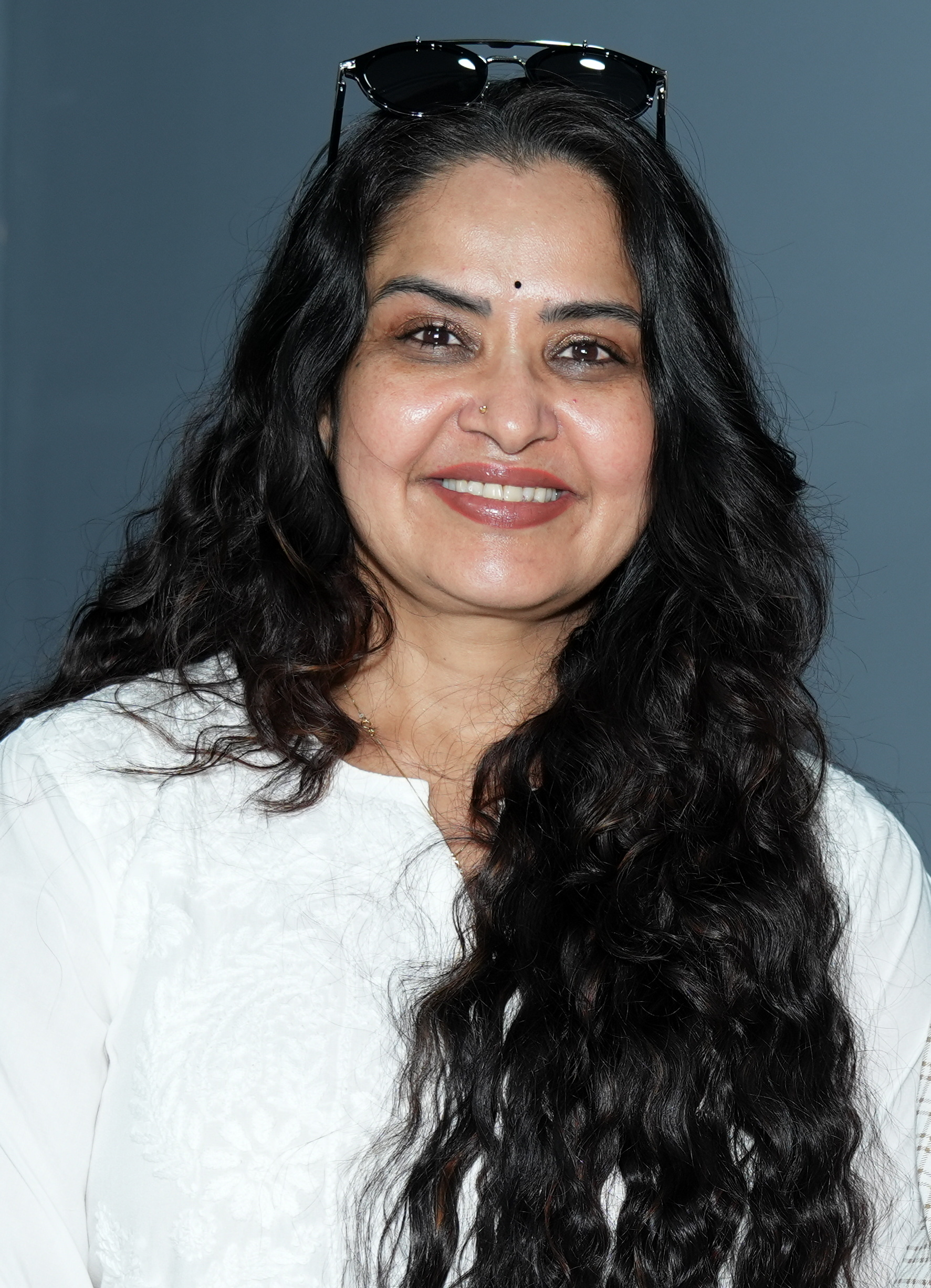
- Pragathi in 2025
- Born: Pragathi Mahavadi; 16 April 1976 (age 50); Ongole, Andhra Pradesh, India
- Occupation: Actress
- Years active: 1994–1997; 2002–present
- Children: 2

Pragathi Mahavadi (born 16 April 1976) is an Indian film and television actress who has acted predominantly in Telugu cinema and in addition to Tamil, Kannada and Malayalam cinema.

== Early life ==
Pragathi was born in Ongole, Andhra Pradesh, India.

== Career ==
Pragathi started her career as a model for Mysore Silk Palace. Later, she was introduced by Bhagyaraj as a lead actress in Veetla Visheshanga. After that, she acted in seven Tamil films and one Malayalam film. She got married and three years later she returned to act in television serials.

== Filmography ==
=== Telugu ===
1. Shabash Ramu (1993)
2. Bobby (2002)
3. Nuvve Nuvve (2002)
4. Nuvvu Leka Nenu Lenu (2002)
5. Gangotri (2003)
6. Samba (2004)
7. Leela Mahal Center (2004)
8. Puttintiki Ra Chelli (2004)
9. Kushi Kushiga (2004)
10. Yamagola Malli Modalayindi (2007)
11. Chirutha (2007)
12. Lakshyam (2007)
13. Athidhi (2007)
14. Pourudu (2008)
15. Bujjigadu (2008)
16. Ready (2008)
17. Chintakayala Ravi (2008)
18. Kurradu (2009)
19. Kalavaramaye Madilo (2009)
20. Namo Venkatesa (2010)
21. Seeta Ramula Kalyanam (2010)
22. Sadhyam (2010)
23. Rama Rama Krishna Krishna (2010)
24. Andari Banduvaya (2010)
25. Jhummandi Naadam (2010)
26. Em Pillo Em Pillado (2010)
27. Brindaavanam (2010)
28. Yemaindi Ee Vela (2010)
29. Chalaki (2010)
30. Kalavar King (2010)
31. Taj Mahal (2010)
32. Rakta Charitra/ Rakta Charitra 2 (2011 - Bilingual)
33. Ala Modalaindi (2011)
34. Shakti (2011)
35. Teen Maar (2011)
36. Mr. Perfect (2011)
37. Badrinath (2011)
38. Kandireega (2011)
39. Daggaraga Dooramga (2011)
40. Dookudu (2011)
41. It's My Love Story (2011)
42. Priyudu (2011)
43. Veera (2011)
44. Vastadu Naa Raju (2011)
45. Aakasame Haddu (2011)
46. Andala Rakshasi (2012)
47. Bodyguard (2012)
48. Nippu (2012)
49. Poola Rangadu (2012)
50. Dhoni (2012)
51. Naa Ishtam (2012)
52. Rachcha (2012)
53. All the Best (2012)
54. Julayi (2012)
55. Dhenikaina Ready (2012)
56. Damarukam (2012)
57. Jabardasth (2013)
58. Baadshah (2013)
59. Priyathama Neevachata Kushalama (2013)
60. Chukkalanti Ammayi Chakkanaina Abbayi (2013)
61. Anthaka Mundu Aa Tarvatha (2013)
62. Backbench Student (2013)
63. Ramayya Vasthavayya (2013)
64. Dalam (2013)
65. Iddarammayilatho (2013)
66. Dillunnodu (2013)
67. Pantham (2013)
68. Rudrakshapalli (2013)
69. Race Gurram (2014)
70. Prathinidhi (2014)
71. Power (2014)
72. Rabhasa (2014)
73. Loukyam (2014)
74. Lakshmi Raave Maa Intiki (2014)
75. Govindudu Andarivadele (2014)
76. Romeo (2014)
77. Oka Laila Kosam (2014)
78. Dongata (2015)
79. Krishnamma Kalipindi Iddarini (2015)
80. Kerintha (2015)
81. Subramanyam For Sale (2015)
82. Bengal Tiger (2015)
83. Soukhyam (2015)
84. Speedunnodu (2016)
85. Abbayitho Ammayi (2016)
86. Nenu Sailaja (2016)
87. Malupu (2016)
88. Kalyana Vaibhogame (2016)
89. Gentleman (2016)
90. Oka Manasu (2016)
91. Srirastu Subhamastu (2016)
92. Shankara (2016)
93. Intlo Deyyam Nakem Bhayam (2016)
94. Radha (2017)
95. Oye Ninne (2017)
96. Prematho Mee Karthik (2017)
97. Chalo (2018)
98. Awe! (2018)
99. Chal Mohan Ranga (2018)
100. Vijetha (2018)
101. F2 - Fun and Frustration (2019)
102. Oh! Baby (2019)
103. Marshal (2019)
104. Arjun Suravaram (2019)
105. 90ML (2019)
106. Maa Vintha Gadha Vinuma (2020)
107. Zombie Reddy (2021)
108. Most Eligible Bachelor (2021)
109. Super Machi (2022)
110. DJ Tillu (2022)
111. F3 (2022)
112. Ranga Ranga Vaibhavanga (2022)
113. Godfather (2022)
114. Swathi Muthyam (2022)
115. Bhola Shankar (2022)
116. Tiragabadara Saami (2024)
117. Naari: The Women (2025)

=== Tamil ===
1. Veetla Visheshanga (1994)
2. Periya Marudhu (1994)
3. Pandiyanin Raajyathil (1994)
4. Summa Irunga Machan (1996)
5. Vaazhga Jananayagam (1996)
6. Pudhalvan (1997)
7. Jayam (2003)
8. Silambattam (2008)
9. Anthony Yaar? (2009)
10. Oliyum Oliyum (2009)
11. Thairiyam (2010)
12. Siddhu +2 (2010)
13. Eththan (2011)
14. Markandeyan (2011)
15. Dhoni (2012)
16. Ishtam (2012)
17. Yagavarayinum Naa Kaakka (2015)
18. Inimey Ippadithan (2015)
19. Gethu (2016)
20. Tharai Thappattai (2016)
21. Vanakkam Da Mappilei (2021)
22. Bagheera (2023)
23. Heartin (2026)

=== Kannada ===
1. Prema Khaidi (2002)
2. Hrudayavantha (2003)
3. Vinayaka Geleyara Balaga (2011)

=== Malayalam ===
1. Keerthanam (1995)
2. Mazhamegha Pravukal (2001)

=== Television ===
Year	Title	Role	Network	Language
1997	Vinayagar Vijayam	Parvati/Matrikas	Sun TV	Tamil
1998–1999	Teerpu		Gemini TV	Telugu
1999–2000	Amma		Gemini TV	Telugu
1998–2000	Sthree	Shobha	Asianet	Malayalam
2001	Akka Chellalu		ETV	Telugu
2001–2002	Jyothi	Advocate Bhuvanesvari	Gemini TV	Telugu
2002	Penn		Sun TV	Tamil
2017	Vamsam	Jeeva	Sun TV	Tamil
2017–2018	Nathicharami	Yamuna	Gemini TV	Telugu
2018–2020	Aranmanai Kili	Meenakshi Sundareshwar	Star Vijay	Tamil
2023	Oorvasivo Rakshashivo	Rakshitha	Star Maa	Telugu

== Awards and nominations ==
Ceremony	Category	Work	Result
Nandi Awards	Best Supporting Actress	Yemaindi Ee Vela	Won
Nandi Awards	Best Female Comedian	Kalyana Vaibhogame	Won
