= Adhinayakudu =

2012 Indian film by Paruchuri Murali

- Theatrical release poster
- Directed by: Paruchuri Murali
- Written by: Paruchuri Murali
- Produced by: M. L. Padma Kumar Chowdhary
- Starring: Nandamuri Balakrishna; Jayasudha; Lakshmi Rai; Saloni
- Cinematography: T. Surendra Reddy
- Edited by: Kotagiri Venkateswara Rao
- Music by: Kalyani Malik
- Production company: Sree Keerthi Creations
- Distributed by: Reliance Entertainment; BlueSky Cinemas (USA)
- Release date: 1 June 2012
- Running time: 151 mins
- Country: India
- Language: Telugu

Adhinayakudu (transl. Captain) is a 2012 Indian Telugu-language action film, produced by M. L. Padma Kumar Chowdhary under Sree Keerthi Creations banner, directed by Paruchuri Murali and cinematography by T. Surendra Reddy. The film stars Nandamuri Balakrishna, Jayasudha, Lakshmi Rai, Sukanya, Saloni with Pradeep Rawat, Aditya Menon, Kota Srinivasa Rao, Murali Sharma, Rahman and Brahmanandam in supporting roles and music composed by Kalyani Malik. Balakrishna played a triple role as a grandfather, father and son for the first time on screen in this film.

== Cast ==
- Nandamuri Balakrishna in a triple role as
  - Harishchandra Prasad
  - Rama Krishna Prasad
  - Bobby
- Raai Laxmi as Deepti
- Jayasudha as Lakshmi
- Sukanya as Rama Krishna Prasad's wife
- Saloni as Shravani
- Pradeep Rawat as Ramappa
- Aditya Menon as Ramappa's brother
- Kota Srinivasa Rao as Politician
- Rahman as Rama Krishna Prasad's brother
- Murali Sharma as DGP
- Brahmanandam as Brahmi
- Charanraj as Professional Killer
- Venu Madhav as Petty Thief
- Kasi Viswanath as Minister
- M. S. Narayana
- Amit Tiwari
- John Kokken as Minister's son
- Sabbah as Secretary

== Soundtrack ==
Adhinayakudu

Soundtrack album by Kalyani Malik
- Released: 8 March 2012
- Recorded: 2012
- Genre: Film soundtrack
- Length: 25:20
- Label: Aditya Music
- Producer: Kalyani Malik

Kalyani Malik chronology
Golconda High School (2011)	Adhinayakudu (2012)	Nuvve Naa Hero (2012)

Music composed by Kalyani Malik. Music released on ADITYA Music Company.

No.	Title	Lyrics	Singer(s)	Length
1.	"Olammi Ammi"	Bhaskarabhatla	S. P. Balasubrahmanyam, Rita	4:30
2.	"Guruda Itu Raaraa"	Bhaskarabhatla	Mano, Rita	4:11
3.	"Oorantha"	Bhaskarabhatla	Kalyani Malik	3:52
4.	"Mast Jawani"	Ramajogayya Sastry	S. P. Balasubrahmanyam, Chaitra Ambadipudi	3:53
5.	"Andam Aakumadi"	Bhaskarabhatla	Mano, Neha	3:49
6.	"Adhigo"	Bhaskarabhatla	Kalyani Malik	3:05
Total length:				25:20

== Release ==
The film was released on 1 June 2012 worldwide after many postponements.

=== Critical reception ===
The film was critically panned by many reviewers for its lack of fresh ideas and presentation. It was viewed as a rehash of many of Balakrishna's previous movies. The Times of India website gave an average rating of 2.5/5 for the film. The CNN-IBN website stated that "Adhinayakudu doesn't deserve any special mention due to its tried and tested old storyline". The NDTV Movies website stated that "Ironically, Adhinayakudu is a travesty of a film". The "SuperGoodMovies" website also gave an average rating of 2.5/5 for the film.
