= Dikkulu Choodaku Ramayya =

- Film poster
- Directed by: Trikoti
- Screenplay by: Trikoti
- Story by: P. V. Giri
- Produced by: Sai Korrapati
- Starring: Ajay; Naga Shourya; Indraja; Sana Makbul
- Cinematography: S. Rajasekhar
- Edited by: Tammiraju
- Music by: M. M. Keeravani
- Production company: Varahi Chalana Chitram
- Release date: 10 October 2014
- Country: India
- Language: Telugu

Dikkulu Choodaku Ramayya (transl. Don't look around, Ramayya) is a 2014 Indian Telugu-language romantic drama film directed by Trikoti. It stars Ajay, Naga Shourya, Indraja and Sana Makbul. Produced by Varahi Chalana Chitram, the film released on 10 October 2014, and was commercially successful.

== Plot ==
Gopala Krishna (Ajay) is a bank employee who is nearing 40 years of age. He married a naïve woman named Bhavani (Indraja) at the age of 18 because of his grandmother's request, thus sacrificing his love. Since then he started toiling hard for survival and settles down at nearly 35 with two kids: Madhu (Naga Shourya), an engineering student; and a younger school-going kid. He flirts with younger girls for mental satisfaction. Krishna's friend Sathyam (Brahmaji) is jealous of this issue as his wife always henpecks him and is extremely suspicious of him.

Situations arise in such a way that a 21-year-old aerobics trainer Samhitha (Sana Makbul) is admired by both Krishna and Madhu without the knowledge of the other. Samhitha happens to be Madhu's college senior who discontinued her studies and has to repay a loan in the bank where Krishna works. Both Krishna and Madhu befriend Samhitha and fall in love with her but are unaware of each other. For Samhitha, Krishna raises a loan from a local gangster.

After a few days, on Samhitha's birthday, Krishna visits her house and proposes marriage to her. Madhu sees this from a distance and leaves dejected. He also breaks ties with Samhitha and plans to save Bhavani, to whom Krishna is next to god. He tries in every possible way to separate them but fails to drive a wedge between them, and they register the date of marriage at Arya Samaj.

On the day of the wedding, Bhavani visits a temple, and with the information given by Samhitha, the police nabs and interrogates Madhu. He only reveals that he loved Samhitha and wanted to marry her. She develops hatred for him and before her and Krishna, the police beats Madhu black and blue, which manages to change Krishna's mindset and reveal the truth that he is already married to Bhavani. Samhitha wants to file a case on the duo but after realizing that Krishna has really changed for the better, she drops her plans. Krishna unites with Bhavani, and Samhitha forgives the duo and leaves while Madhu looks on.

== Cast ==
- Ajay as Gopala "Krish" Krishna
- Naga Shourya as Madhu
- Sana Makbul as Samhitha
- Indraja as Bhavani
- Brahmaji as Sathyam
- Ali as Tom
- Hari Teja as Vasundhara, Sathyam's wife
- Posani Krishna Murali as Police officer
- Jhansi as Gopala Krishna's boss
- Venu Yeldandi
- Vishal O Sharma

== Soundtrack ==
The soundtrack was composed by M. M. Keeravani.

No.	Title	Artist(s)	Length
1.	"Dinthana"	Rahul Sipligunj	4:58
2.	"Chembisthri"	Revanth	2:40
3.	"Theli Pothunna"	Ramya Behara	3:37
4.	"Anthe Premanthe"	K.K. Bhairava, Mohana Bhogaraju	4:56
5.	"Andhari Raathalu"	Ramesh Vinayakam, Yamini	3:39
6.	"Dikkulu Choodaku Ramayya"	Kalpana	1:43

== Critical reception ==
The Times of India gave the film 2.5 stars out of 5 and wrote, "Beyond the interesting premise, the film feels like any other triangular love story. It has its flashes of brilliance...however, the film overstays its welcome especially in the second half. In the end, the film doesn't quite hit the ball out of the park and leaves a big void despite dabbling with a new storyline". The Hindu wrote, "This film could have been a game changer but sadly, isn't". Deccan Chronicle gave 3 stars and wrote, "you can watch Dikkulu Choodaku Ramayya once, and should appreciate the debutant director for his good effort to come up with a new subject". 123telugu wrote, "Dikkulu Choodaku Ramayya is a refreshing change from the routine commercial flicks which are coming out off late. Even though this film lacks proper narration in parts, it will still make up for a decent watch for its unique content".

This movie plot line is loosely based on English movie " American Beauty - 1999".

=== Remakes ===
After the film success, the film is being remade in Hindi language. According to sources Film Producer Sanjeev kumar taken the remake rights from Telugu Producer.
