= Abbayitho Ammayi =

2016 film by Ramesh Varma

- Release poster
- Directed by: Ramesh Varma
- Written by: Vamsi Komanduru; Ravi Prakash; Patrikeya
- Produced by: Jakkam; Kireeti Potini; Srinivas Sammeta
- Starring: Naga Shourya; Pallak Lalwani; Brahmanandam; Mohan
- Cinematography: Shyam K. Naidu
- Edited by: M. S. Rajashekhar Reddy (S. R. Shekhar)
- Music by: Ilaiyaraaja
- Production companies: JG Cinemas, Kiran Studios, Bloomingstars Motion Pictures, Mohanaroopa Films
- Release date: 1 January 2016
- Country: India
- Language: Telugu

Abbayitho Ammayi (transl. The girl with the boy) is a 2016 Indian Telugu-language romantic drama film directed by Ramesh Varma. The film stars Naga Shourya and Pallak Lalwani, with Brahmanandam, Rao Ramesh and Tamil actor Mohan playing supporting roles. The film was released on 1 January 2016 to mixed reviews. This film is the 999th movie of Ilaiyaraaja as a music director.

== Plot ==
Abhi is a youth who wants to have fun in life. He is addicted to social networking sites and likes to flirt with girls. During his search, he befriends a simple girl. This is also the time when he falls for Prardhana and becomes close to her. But Abhi is caught in a compromising situation in Prardhana's house. Their families then disown them. Left clueless, Abhi abandons Pradhana. He is then surprised to discover that his online friend is none other than Prardhana. Abhi then toils to regain her love.

== Cast ==
- Naga Shourya as Abhi
- Pallak Lalwani as Prardhana
- Brahmanandam
- Mohan as Abhi's father
- Rao Ramesh as Prardhana's father
- Pragathi as Prardhana's mother
- Tulasi as Abhi's mother
- Praveen
- Prudhviraj
- Shakalaka Shankar
- Tejaswi Madiwada
- Lasya

== Soundtrack ==
Maestro Ilaiyaraaja scored the music, while lyrics were penned by Rehman, Chaitanya Varma and Sirasri.

Abbayitho Ammayi

Soundtrack album to Abbayitho Ammayi by Ilaiyaraaja
- Released: 18 November 2015
- Recorded: 2015
- Genre: Feature film soundtrack
- Length: 36:46
- Language: Telugu
- Label: Aditya Music
- Producer: Ilaiyaraaja

Ilaiyaraaja chronology
Rudhramadevi (2015)	Abbayitho Ammayi (2015)	Tharai Thappattai (2016)

No.	Song	Singers	Lyrics	Length (m:ss)
1	"Reena Mecareena"	Piyush Kapur	Rehman	4:47
2	"Edhuru Choosthunna"	Vibhavari	Rehman	5:22
3	"Tholi Paruvam"	Satya Prakash, Vibhavari	Rehman	5:47
4	"Maatallo Cheppaleni"	Karthik	Rehman	4:18
5	"Kanulu Kalanu Piliche"	Haricharan, Chinmayi	Rehman	4:57
6	"Okasaari O Vayyari"	Yazin Nizar, Rita, Blaaze	Rehman	3:47
7	"Saradale"	M. M. Manasi, Ramya, Rita, Reena Reddy	Chaitanya Varma	4:46
8	"Abbayitho Ammayi" (Male)	Piyush Kapur	Sirasri	1:31
9	"Abbayitho Ammayi" (Female)	Aparna	Sirasri	1:28

== Reception ==
The Hindu panned Abbayitho Ammayi, describing the leads' virtual relationship as "overdrawn, outdated and melodramatic." They also wrote that "Songs are good but the re-recording and background score leave a lot to be desired." Indiaglitz gave the film a rating of 3/5 stars, calling it as a coming-of-age love story with interesting plot and fair narration, appreciating Ilaiyaraaja' s music and good chemistry of lead pair Naga Shourya and Pallak Lalwani. Venkat of Greatandhra gave 2.25/5 stars mentioning that the film is a big bore, except for visual quality and climax portions. He also blamed the silly story, outdated comedy and illogical sequences as the drawback of the film.
