= Kalyani Malik =

Indian music director and Playback singer

Kalyan Malik
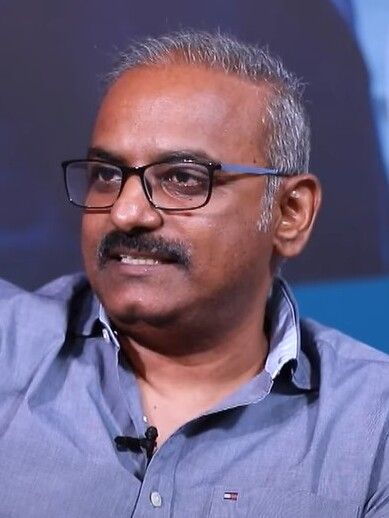
- Malik in 2023
- Born: Koduri Kalyan; 1972 (age 53–54); Kovvur, Andhra Pradesh, India
- Other names: Kalyan Koduri, Koduri Kalyan
- Occupations: Composer; playback singer
- Years active: 2003–present
- Parent: Siva Shakthi Datta
- Relatives: See Koduri family

Kalyani Malik (born 1972) is an Indian music director and playback singer in Telugu cinema. Since achieving recognition through Chandra Sekhar Yeleti's film Aithe (2003), Malik has provided musical scores for many other films. His most recent works are composing for Oohalu Gusagusalade (2014) and as sound supervisor for Baahubali: The Beginning. He is known by various other names — Kalyani Koduri, Koduri Kalyani.

== Early life ==
Kalyani Malik was born as "Koduri Kalyani". He born and brought up in Kovvur, to Siva Shakthi Datta and Bhanumathi. He is the brother of music composer M. M. Keeravani and actor/writer S. S. Kanchi and cousin to director S. S. Rajamouli and M. M. Srilekha.

His birth name was Kalyani. He suffixed Malik to his name, as he is a devotee of Lord Mallikarjuna of Srisailam, and uses the screen name "Kalyani Malik". He is known by various other names — Kalyan Koduri, Kalyana Ramana, Kalyani Koduri, Kalyani, Koduri Kalyan.

== Career ==
Malik started off as a chorus singer with his brother M. M. Keeravani's compositions. Later, it was with the song "Sannajaji Poova" from Yuvaratna, composed by his brother, that he was noticed as a full-fledged singer. After singing quite good number of songs for his brother, he started assisting his brother and learned the nuances of music composing. After gaining experience, his journey as a solo music director started with jingles, TV serials and finally the entry to the silver screen happened with Aithe. This was follow by albums such as Ashta Chemma, Ala Modalaindi, Golconda High School and Oohalu Gusagusalade.

== Discography ==
Key
†	Denotes films that have not yet been released

Year	Title	Notes
2001–2007	Amrutham	Television series
2003	Aithe	
2003	Naam	Tamil film
2004	Manasu Maata Vinadu	
2005	Andhrudu	
2006	Boss	
2006	Valliddari Vayasu Padahare	
2006	Amrutha Varsham	
2008	Ashta Chemma	
2010	Ala Modalaindi	
2011	Golconda High School	
2012	Adhinayakudu	
2013	Anthaku Mundu Aa Taruvatha	
2014	Oohalu Gusagusalade	
2015	Bandipotu	
2015	Hora Hori	
2016	Kalyana Vaibhogame	
2016	Jyo Achyutananda	
2018	Ammammagarillu	
2019	Lakshmi's NTR	
2020	Amrutham Dhvitheeyam	Television series
2021	Check	
2022	Intinti Ramayanam	
2022	Phalana Abbayi Phalana Ammayi	
2024	Vidya Vasula Aham	
2024	Honeymoon Express	Only songs

== Awards and nominations ==
Mirchi Music Awards South

- 2014 – Best Playback singer Male – Oohalu Gusagusalade for "Em Sandeham Ledu" – won
- 2014 – Music Composer of The Year – Oohalu Gusagusalade – won

Filmfare Awards South

- 2012 – Best Music Director – Telugu – Ala Modalaindi – nominated
- 2014 – Best Music Director – Telugu – Oohalu Gusagusalade – nominated

South Indian International Movie Awards

- 2015 – Best Music Director (Telugu) – Jyo Achyutananda – nominated
