= Naga Shaurya =

Indian actor (born 1989)

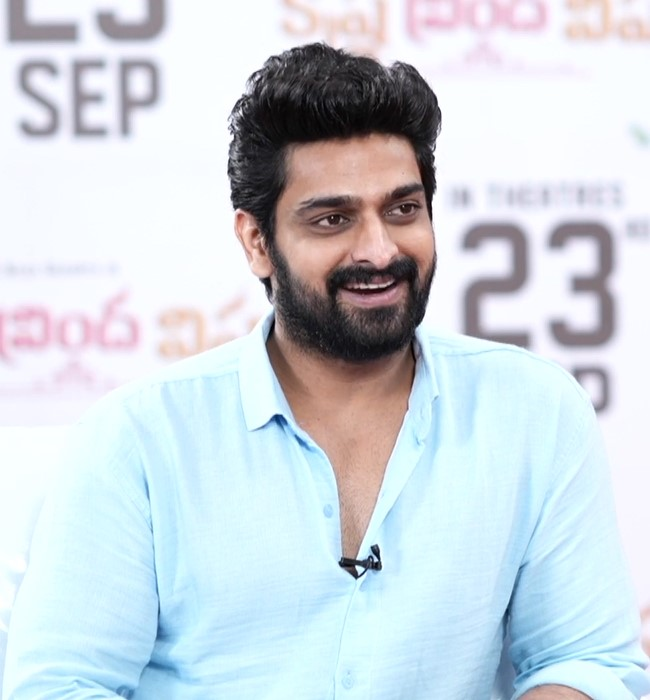
- Naga Shaurya in 2022
- Born: 22 January 1989 (age 37); Eluru, Andhra Pradesh, India
- Education: St. Mary's College, Hyderabad
- Occupations: Actor; producer; writer
- Years active: 2011–present
- Spouse: Anusha Shetty (m. 2022)

Naga Shaurya (born 22 January 1989) is an Indian actor and producer who works in Telugu films. Shaurya made his debut with the coming-of-age film Cricket, Girls and Beer (2011). After starring in the National Award-winning anthology film Chandamama Kathalu (2014), Shaurya had his breakthrough with the romantic comedy Oohalu Gusagusalade the same year.

Shaurya went on to establish himself as a leading actor with successful films such as the romantic drama Dikkulu Choodaku Ramayya (2014), the romantic comedy Kalyana Vaibhogame (2016), the romantic drama Oka Manasu (2016), the comedy dramas Jyo Achyutananda (2016) and Chalo (2018), the fantasy comedy Oh! Baby (2019), the action thriller Ashwathama (2020), and the romantic comedy Varudu Kaavalenu (2021). Shaurya has since suffered a career setback with five poorly received films.

== Early life ==
Naga Shaurya was born on 22 January 1989 in Eluru, Andhra Pradesh. He lived for several years in Vijayawada, before moving to Hyderabad to pursue his dream of acting in films. Prior to entering the film industry, he played tennis. Shaurya's parents Shankar Prasad and Usha Prasad are partners in his production house.

== Career ==
=== Debut and early breakthrough (2011–2015) ===
Before he got his first role, Shaurya struggled for almost five years. He stated, "Every time I was on the verge of signing a film, something or the other would happen and I was back to square one", and added that he was "disappointed and wanted to go back to my parents". Shaurya first appeared on screen in Cricket Girls & Beer. Shaurya saw an advertisement by Vaaraahi Chalana Chitram, who were casting for Srinivas Avasarala's romantic comedy Oohalu Gusagusalade and sent in his portfolio. Although he had no hopes, he was selected for the lead role. While working on Oohalu Gusagualade, he was selected for a role in Chandamama Kathalu which released first. An anthology film, it featured Shaurya as part of an ensemble cast.

Shaurya's Oohalu Gusagusalade with Raashi Khanna, released two months later and became a critical and commercial success. While praising his performance Deccan Chronicle noted, "Naga Shourya is perfect for the role of Venky; he looks fresh and has performed with ease." His third release that year, Dikkulu Choodaku Ramayya with Sana Makbul, was again a romantic comedy. A triangular love story directed by Trikoti, it was about a son and father falling for the same girl. The Hindu wrote, "Naga Shaurya proves yet again that he's one of the best among the newer lot of actors. He brings in the required innocence of a teenager and shows his anguish and helplessness in the later portions effectively". Shaurya's final release of the year was Lakshmi Raave Maa Intiki with Avika Gor. In 2015, Shaurya appeared in Jadoogadu under the direction of Yogie opposite Sonarika Bhadoria.

=== Success and rise in Telugu cinema (2016–2021) ===
Shaurya's career marked a turning point in 2016 with five films: Abbayitho Ammayi, B. V. Nandini Reddy's Kalyana Vaibhogame, G. V. Rama Raju's Oka Manasu, Srinivas Avasarala's Jyo Achyutananda and Nee Jathaleka. Of these films, only Kalyana Vaibhogame with Malvika Nair and Jyo Achyutananda with Regina Cassandra, were commercially successful. Praising his performance in Jyo Achyutananda, Idlebrain stated, "Naga Shourya is aptly cast. His character should look vulnerable and his casting helped it. He has done extremely well." While The Hindu opioned, "Naga Shourya is the pick of the lot here; he delivers an extremely nuanced performance." In 2017, Shaurya played a cameo in the film Kathalo Rajakumari.

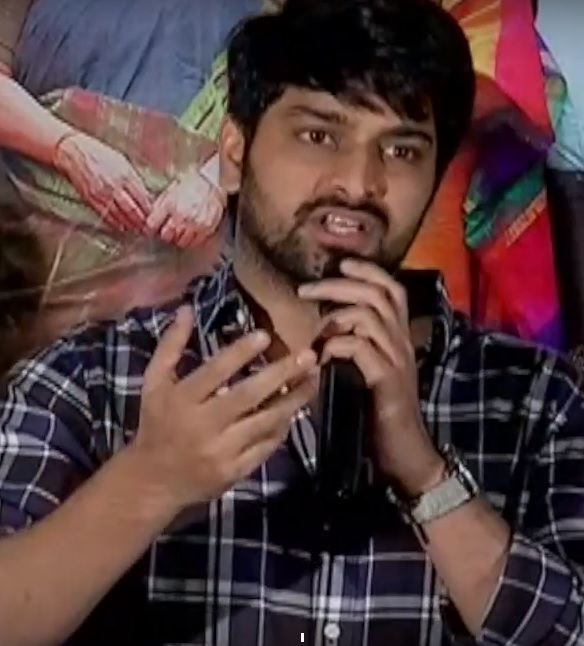
Naga Shaurya in 2018

Shaurya appeared in four films in 2018. The first release, Chalo with Rashmika Mandanna, was a box office success. Firstpost noted, "For Naga Shaurya, Chalo feels like a step in the right direction, and he’s completely at ease with himself. He succeeds to a good extent, until the story runs out of fuel." His other films that year, the Tamil-Telugu bilingual Diya, the family entertainer Ammammagarillu and the romantic comedy Nartanasala failed at the box office. The Hindu criticized the latter for its approach on gay people.

Shaurya's only release in 2019, was the fantasy comedy Oh! Baby with Samantha Ruth Prabhu. The film, which received positive reviews, was a commercial success. Deccan Chronicle said, "Naga Shaurya does his small role neatly." His 2020 action thriller film, Aswathama with Mehreen Pirzada, produced by his home banner Ira Creations, was a profitable venture. Firstpost opioned, "It is not just the narrative that keeps you at the edge of the seat but also a major credit for that goes to Shaurya. The actor has reinvented himself as an action hero, and the transformation works quite well." Times of India said, "Naga Shaurya does an okay job when it comes to portraying emotions for some reason. His frustration and anger work well for the action scenes.".

In 2021, Shaurya had two releases, Varudu Kaavalenu and Lakshya. The former had an average run where as Lakshya failed to get the cash registers ringing at the box office. The News Minute termed his performance in Varudu Kaavalenu as "convincing". For Lakshya, Times of India stated, "The film clearly shows off the hard work that Shaurya has put in. For someone who has played a boy-next-door for the most part, this film is a test to his caliber and it’s not just his body that has transformed."

=== Commercial decline (2022–present) ===
Shaurya's only film in 2022, Krishna Vrinda Vihari with Shirley Setia, was a box-office failure. The Hindu praised him and stated that Naga Shaurya has puts up a "spirited performance".

Shaurya had two releases in 2023 - Phalana Abbayi Phalana Ammayi with Malvika Nair and Rangabali with Yukti Thareja. Despite mixed to positive reviews, both the films turned out to be box-office disappointments. For Phalana Abbayi Phalana Ammayi, Telangana Today stated, "Naga Shaurya proves that he’s a bankable star when it comes to the rom-com genre." The Indian Express noted his work in Rangabali and said, "Naga Shaurya does a good job in a character tailor-made for him."

Shaurya had only release in 2026, Ramesh Desina's film Bad Boy Karthik was released on 17 April and became a box-office disaster.

Shaurya will next appear in Raja Kolusu's film Nari Nari Naduma Murari, and Mahesh S. Koneru's film Police Vari Hecharika.

== Personal life ==
Shaurya married his girlfriend Anusha Shetty in Bengaluru on 20 November 2022. Anusha is an interior designer based in Bangalore. Shaurya is an animal lover and owns a dog.

== Other work and media image ==
123telugu termed Shaurya a "promising and talented actor". In Hyderabad Times' Most Desirable Men list, Shaurya was placed 10th in 2016 and 5th in 2020.

In 2015, Shaurya donated Rs. 50000 to a soldier named Botta Satyam's family who had been killed while fighting terrorists in Jammu and Kashmir. In Lakshmi Manchu's show Memu Saitham, Shaurya ran a salon to raise funds for a farmer's family. Shaurya and Samantha Ruth Prabhu also attended Hyderabad traffic police initiative "Road Safety Clubs in Schools".

=== Ira Creations ===
Shaurya started his own production house named Ira Creations and first produced Chalo (2018), with his mother Usha Mulpuri. Since then, Shaurya has co-produced Nartanasala (2018), Aswathama (2020) and Krishna Vrinda Vihari (2022).

== Filmography ==
=== Films ===
Key
†	Denotes films that have not yet been released

- All films are in Telugu, unless otherwise noted.

Year	Title	Role	Notes	Ref.
2011	Cricket Girls & Beer	Vikram		
2014	Chandamama Kathalu	Raju		
2014	Oohalu Gusagusalade	N. Venkateswara "Venky" Rao		
2014	Dikkulu Choodaku Ramayya	Madhu		
2014	Lakshmi Raave Maa Intiki	Sai		
2015	Jadoogadu	Krishna		
2016	Abbayitho Ammayi	Abhi		
2016	Kalyana Vaibhogame	Shourya		
2016	Oka Manasu	Surya		
2016	Jyo Achyutananda	Anand Vardhan Rao		
2016	Nee Jathaleka	Akhil		
2017	Kathalo Rajakumari	Shourya	Cameo appearance	
2018	Chalo	Hari		
2018	Kanam	Krishna	Bilingual film; Simultaneously shot in Telugu and Tamil	
2018	Diya	Krishna	Bilingual film; Simultaneously shot in Telugu and Tamil	
2018	Ammammagarillu	Santhosh		
2018	Nartanasala	Radha Krishna		
2019	Oh! Baby	Vikram		
2020	Aswathama	Gana		
2021	Varudu Kaavalenu	Akash		
2021	Lakshya	Pardhu		
2022	Krishna Vrinda Vihari	Krishna Chari		
2023	Phalana Abbayi Phalana Ammayi	Sanjay Pisapati		
2023	Rangabali	Shaurya "Show"		
2026	Bad Boy Karthik	Karthik		

=== Television ===
Year	Title	Role	Notes	Ref.
2017	No. 1 Yaari	Himself	with Nara Rohit	
2018	Memu Saitham 2	Himself	Episode 4	

=== Other crew positions ===
Year	Title	Role	Notes	Ref.
2018	Bhoomi	Director	Short film	
2018	Chalo	Co-producer	Under Ira Creations	
2018	Nartanasala	Co-producer	Under Ira Creations	
2020	Aswathama	Co-producer and story writer	Under Ira Creations	
2022	Krishna Vrinda Vihari	Co-producer	Under Ira Creations	
