= Kalyana Vaibhogame =

Kalyana Vaibhogam
- Release poster
- Directed by: B. V. Nandini Reddy
- Written by: B. V. Nandini Reddy
- Produced by: K. L. Damodar Prasad
- Starring: Naga Shourya; Malavika Nair
- Cinematography: G. V. S. Raju
- Edited by: Junaid Siddiqui
- Music by: Kalyan Koduri
- Release date: 4 March 2016
- Running time: 158 min
- Country: India
- Language: Telugu
- Budget: ₹3 crore

Kalyana Vaibhogame (lit. 'Grandeur of marriage') is a 2016 Indian Telugu romantic comedy film written and directed by B. V. Nandini Reddy. Produced by K.L.Damodar Prasad under Sri Ranjith Movies the film stars Naga Shourya and Malavika Nair and Raasi, Aishwarya, Raj Mudhiraj and Anand in the supporting roles. The film was released worldwide on 4 March 2016 to critical acclaim.

== Cast ==
- Naga Shourya as Shourya
- Malavika Nair as Divya
- Raasi as Prameela Devi
- Anand
- Pragathi
- Naveen Neni
- Aishwarya
- Thagubothu Ramesh as Goutham, Software Engineer
- Geetha Singh as Punjabi Guest
- Snigdha
- Pearle Maaney as Vaidehi
- Raj Madiraju
- Ashish Vidyarthi as garbage vehicle driver (guest appearance)

== Soundtrack ==
Kalyana Vaibhogame

Soundtrack album by Kalyan Koduri
- Released: 27 December 2015
- Recorded: 2015
- Genre: Soundtrack
- Length: 23:44
- Label: Madhura Audio
- Producer: Kalyan Koduri

Kalyan Koduri chronology
Hora Hori (2015)	Kalyana Vaibhogame (2015)	Jyo Achyutananda (2016)

The film's music was composed by Kalyan Koduri and released by Madhura Audio.

All tracks are written by Lakshmi Bhoopal.

Track-List
No.	Title	Artist(s)	Length
1.	"Chakkandala Chukka"	Kalyan Koduri, Sunitha Upadrashta	4:14
2.	"Chirunavvule"	Haricharan, Sushma Triya	3:52
3.	"Pal Pal"	Rahul Nambiar, Pearle Maaney	3:39
4.	"Manasantha Meghamai"	Chinmayi	4:14
5.	"Pelli Pelli"	Deepu, Dhanraj, Hemanth Kumar, Labhoo	3:54
6.	"Evaru Neevu"	Vijay Yesudas	3:51
Total length:			23:44

== Release and reception ==
Kalyana Vaibhogame was released on 4 March 2016 in 300 screens across Telangana and Andhra Pradesh and received critical acclaim. The distribution rights for Nizam regions were given to Abhishek Pictures. The distribution rights for North India and Orissa regions were by Golden Tree Entertainment Company.

== US Box Office Gross ==
Kalyana Vaibhogame collected $13,257 during the Thursday Premieres and collected $32,365 on Friday at the US box office. It collected $64,237 on Saturday taking the total to $109,859. Kalyana Vaibhogame has collected $142,011 (₹ 95.51 lakh) from 68 screens and made better collection than Priyanka Chopra's Bollywood movie Jai Gangaajal at the US box office in the first weekend. It has collected $46,656 at the US box office in its second weekend and its 10-day US total collection stands at $227,092 (₹ 1.53 crore).
