= Oohalu Gusagusalade =

- Film poster
- Directed by: Srinivas Avasarala
- Written by: Srinivas Avasarala
- Based on: Cyrano de Bergerac by Edmond Rostand
- Produced by: Sai Korrapati; Rajani Korrapati
- Starring: Naga Shourya; Raashii Khanna; Srinivas Avasarala
- Cinematography: Venkat Dilip Chunduru
- Edited by: Kiran Ganti
- Music by: Kalyani Malik
- Production companies: Vaaraahi Chalana Chitram; Silly Monks
- Release date: 20 June 2014
- Running time: 128 minutes
- Country: India
- Language: Telugu

Oohalu Gusagusalade (transl. Imaginations whispered) is a 2014 Indian Telugu-language romantic comedy film written and directed by Srinivas Avasarala in his directorial debut. The film is produced by Sai Korrapati and Rajani Korrapati on Vaaraahi Chalana Chitram banner. It stars Naga Shaurya, Raashii Khanna (in her Telugu film debut) and Avasarala. An adaption of the 1897 French play Cyrano de Bergerac by Edmond Rostand, the plot revolves around a young girl Prabhavati (Khanna) and two men Venky (Shaurya) and Uday (Avasarala) who love her.

Kalyani Malik composed the film's score soundtrack while Venkat C. Dileep and Kiran Ganti performed the cinematography and editing respectively. The film's principal photography commenced in October 2013 and the film was extensively shot in Hyderabad and Visakhapatnam. After aggressive promotion, the film released worldwide on 20 June 2014. Upon release, the film received positive reviews and went on to become a commercial success. The film is considered one of the "25 Greatest Telugu Films Of The Decade" by Film Companion.

== Plot ==
N. Venkateswara "Venky" Rao works at UB TV and his aim is to become a news reader like his father N. Bhanu Murthy. Bhanu Murthy discontinued his work as a news reader in Doordarshan after entry of new channels and a paralytic attack. However, Venky is unable to reach his target and he has a strong contender in the race for his dream job is Vamana Rao. Meanwhile, for the past four years, Venky is stuck working as an anchor for Teleshopping advertisements at UB TV. Moreover, his overbearing boss Uday Bhaskar is jealous of Venky as Venky can easily communicate with girls whereas Uday is extremely awkward in his interactions with women. Therefore, he turns a roadblock in Venky's aim to become a news reader. After rejecting many marriage proposals, Uday agrees to marry a dentist Sirisha after seeing her photograph given by his marriage broker. After their first meet, Sirisha wants to meet Uday again for understanding him better. Since Uday is not good at communication with women, he takes the help of Venky and seeks his advice. Based on her preferences, Venky gives some suggestions to Uday at a bowling alley. While returning to their homes, Uday asks Venky about his comfortable approach towards girls and asks Venky if he has any past love experiences. Venky narrates his love story. In 2009, Venky went to Visakhapatnam for summer vacation and he met a Delhi-based nineteen-year-old girl, Prabhavathi a.k.a. Prabha. Prabha has also come for a vacation to Vizag for peace of mind as her parents are going through a divorce in Delhi. Venky and Prabha meet in a movie theater and come to know that they reside in the same apartment complex. Venky develops a crush on her but he is advised not to take any hasty steps by his uncle and aunt.

Venky and Prabha develop a good friendship and when Venky starts developing much stronger feelings for her, his uncle asks him to list at least 10 reasons why he loves her. He writes 100 reasons in a book and sings them all together once. On the birthday of Prabha, Venky takes her out to a nice dinner and proposes her. She replies that though she likes him and treats him as her best friend, she cannot accept his proposal as she is only 19 and can't take such a big decision at that age. She asks him to continue their friendship and they can take a decision later. Venky is offended and reacts telling her that he is new to "Delhi culture" with flirtatious and temporary relationships. Annoyed, she leaves the restaurant and Venky's efforts to apologize her fail completely as she leaves for Delhi the next day. After Venky narrates his story, both Venky and Uday say good bye to each other and part for the night. Next morning, Uday and Sirisha meet and all attempts by Uday to impress her fail. She decides to seek another alliance and to choose the best between the two. Then, Uday and his broker decide to send Venky's photograph as the new bridegroom. The plan is to portray him as a wastrel and Uday as a good friend, so that Sirisha accepts Uday. Venky is forced to act as per the plan under the threat that he will be dismissed from his job and his career will be ruined if he fails to do so. Uday also offers him a job as a news reader in UB TV if he obeys the former's orders. Venky obliges and visits a temple next morning where he is scheduled to meet Sirisha. Here, he realizes that Sirisha is none other than Prabha, his former muse. To avoid an uncomfortable situation, Venky enlists the help of Chinta Guru Murthy, a NRI who befriends Venky during the temple visit.

Venky persuades Guru to pose as the prospective bridegroom, so that Prabha can reject him and go back to Uday. When Prabha reaches home, she discovers that bridegroom was Venky and not Gurumurthy. She wants to meet Venky and propose to him as she grew to cherish their relationship over the past few years. Next day, Uday and Venky sit in a coffee shop where Uday gives Venky a Bluetooth device and a smart phone for communication. Using that, Uday plans to seek Venky's real-time help while conversing with Prabha. When Uday goes to bring the phone's charger, Prabha meets Venky and proposes him. Before Venky can respond, Uday reaches the location and Venky runs into washroom along with the phone's charger. Via Bluetooth, Venky helps Uday converse eloquently with Prabha. The conversation of Uday and Prabha ends with a decision to meet at 7:00 pm at a hotel the next Friday for dinner. When Uday leaves, Venky comes back and he agrees to meet her at 9 pm on the same Friday near Necklace road. During the dinner, Uday wants to give a love letter to Prabha and Venky pens it in the form of a poem which can be sung as a song.

Uday speaks to Prabha while seeking guidance from Venky via bluetooth and when she is about to leave, he gives her the love letter. She reads it during her journey to Necklace road and is impressed. When she meets Venky at Necklace road and proposes to him, he rejects her and she leaves dejected. Next night, Uday goes to Prabha's house with a bouquet when she is about to spend a little quality alone-time. But this time, neither Venky's phone signals work, nor his phone's battery has sufficient charging. Thus, Uday can seek Venky's help only for a few moments and when the phone call ends, Uday proposes to prabha on the spur of the moment and tries to present her a ring. The plan backfires and Prabha asks Uday to leave her house. After leaving the house, Uday enlists the help of Venky again and sings a song praising her beauty. She is impressed and agrees to marry Uday. When Prabha wears the ring given by Uday, Venky is dejected and leaves home. At home, Venky is advised by his mother that Uday is using him as a scapegoat. She advises him to resign from his job and win back Prabha. When Venky reaches the office next morning, his colleague Kalyani tells him that he is selected as the news reader for the evening news bulletin. He goes to Uday's chamber and submits his resignation. When he is about to leave Venky's office to meet Prabha, Uday beats him up and ties him to a chair and covers his mouth with a tape. Then, Uday selects Vamana Rao as the evening bulletin news reader. However, Kalyani who saw Venky entering Uday's chamber doubts Uday. Uday and Prabha meet up at a shopping mall and start to watch UB TV's first ever news bulletin. Venky at Uday's chamber causes a fire in the room with a cigarette lighter to garner attention and is rescued. Kalyani sends him to read weather telecast and when he is visible on screen, his parents and his uncle and aunt at Visakhapatnam are happy for him. He then reveals the whole truth and proposes to Prabha telling her that he visited Visakhapatnam every summer vacation since he met her though she never returned. Before Uday can stop Prabha from leaving him, he is attacked by Guru who locks him up in a restroom at the shopping mall. With the help of Guru, Prabha reaches UB TV office and after a small quarrel, Venky and Prabha unite. Before Uday can fire Venky, he is stopped by his father. Because of all these developments, the TRP's of UB TV cross TV9 and Venky becomes highly popular. Uday makes Venky the news reader of evening bulletin and he assigns Vamana Rao to Teleshopping. The film ends with Venky helping Uday in flirting with a girl using Bluetooth communication.

== Cast ==
- Naga Shourya as N. Venkateswara Rao "Venky"
- Raashii Khanna as Dr. U.Sri Sai Sirisha Prabhavathi "Siri/Prabha"
- Srinivas Avasarala as K. Uday Bhaskar "Uday"
- Surya as Uday's father
- Rao Ramesh as Venky's uncle
- Hema as Venky's aunt
- Pragathi as Venky's mother
- C. V. L. Narasimha Rao as Venky's father
- Satya Krishnan as Prabha's sister-in-law
- Posani Krishna Murali as Vamana Rao
- Prudhviraj as marriage broker
- Harish Koyalagundla as Chinta Guru Murthy
- Vidya Rao as Kalyani
- Kalyani Malik as Black ticket seller (cameo appearance)
- Krishna Bhagavaan as voice-over

== Production ==
After working in few Telugu films since 2008, actor Srinivas Avasarala who holds a diploma in writing at UCLA wanted to direct a film. In an interview he said that he wanted to start a "small budget venture that can be easily executed." To this end, he chose the main conflict point of the famous French play Cyrano de Bergerac and prepared a story. Srinivas made umpteen attempts to find a producer for this project. Finally, Sai Korrapati agreed to produce the film. The film was officially launched on 9 September 2013 at Hyderabad as Production No. 3 of Vaaraahi Chalana Chitram banner. While Srinivas Avasarala made his directorial debut with this film, Naga Shourya was selected to play the lead role. This film was supposed to be his debut too, though his succeeding film Chandamama Kathalu released first. He went to the audition when Vaaraahi Chalana Chitram issued a casting call to give his final try as an actor after trying for almost 4 1/2 years. He was selected after portraying a comedy scene narrated by the director A Telugu NRI Venkat C. Dileep, an alumnus of Savannah College of Art and Design and a camera assistant in a few Hollywood projects, was selected as the cinematographer of the film by Srinivas Avasarala on the recommendation of a common friend Bala Rajasekhar. This project marked his debut in Telugu cinema. Kalyani Koduri was selected as the music director of the film and the recording of the songs started on 1 October 2013. After rejecting 40–50 titles, the title Oohalu Gusagusalade, the title of a song from the N. T. Rama Rao film Bandipotu, was selected.

After the makers watched Madras Cafe, they approached Raashii Khanna who played the role of Ruby Singh, the wife of Major Vikram Singh played by John Abraham in that film for the role of the female lead. About her selection, she said "They called me for a narration. Initially I thought it would be more of a dancing role with little scope for acting. When I went down for the narration, I was excited to find that the film revolves around the girl who was there in practically every scene." She said that her role was "selfish, egoistic and stubborn" which she claimed to be very different from what she was. She added "Except that she's from Delhi, my real life persona has nothing in common with the role I played in the film. Initially, when I heard the script, I kept wondering why Prabhavati behaves in a certain manner and throughout the shooting process, Srinivas Avasarala kept justifying Prabhavati's actions because she comes with a lot of emotional baggage". Since the character of Prabhavathi is a fan of Mohammad Rafi, Srinivas brought his own collection of old books and cassettes to fill the frame for a particular scene in the film as they were not available in the market. Srinivas Avasarala played the role of a CEO of a TV channel in the film. Though Sai Korrapati did not want him to act in this film, he later agreed to Srinivas's inclusion after seeing the rushes of the scenes shot in his absence. The filming started in October 2013 and took place in Hyderabad and Visakhapatnam with the use of limited resources and low budget. Because of the same reason, lot of close up scenes were shot and the set properties in the background were changed so that each frame would look different as they did not have enough money to fill the entire frame with such properties. The cinematographer said that there were limited lights and they had to work hard to make the scenes appear natural using those lights during the shoot at Visakhapatnam.

== Themes and influences ==
This film is an adaptation of 19th-century French play Cyrano de Bergerac. Writer and director Srinivas Avasarala is a fan of American artist and filmmaker Woody Allen, in the movie the lead characters stand near a poster of Annie Hall, a celebrated film directed by Woody Allen. The poster depicts a parodic Telugu version of the movie named Annie Hall Lone ("only in Annie Hall"), with Srinivas Avasarala listed as a cast member after Woody Allen and Diane Keaton. That scene, where the lead actor offers a lift to the lead actress when he doesn't have a motorcycle and she accepts though she has a scooter, was taken from Annie Hall.

== Soundtrack ==
Kalyani Malik was selected as the music director of the film marking his first collaboration with Srinivas Avasarala. The album featured four songs with lyrics written by Anantha Sriram and Sirivennela Seetharama Sastry. The audio was launched at Hyderabad in a promotional audio launch event on 28 April 2014 on Vel Records Label.

== Release ==
In early June 2014, the makers confirmed that the film would release on 20 June 2014 worldwide in theaters after being awarded with a clean U certificate from Central Board of Film Certification. The distribution rights of Nizam, West, Guntur, Nellore and Bangalore were acquired by Suresh Movies. Visakhapatnam & Krishna district distribution rights were acquired by Annapurna Distributions, East region distribution rights were acquired by 14 Reels Entertainment and Ceded region rights were purchased by NVR Cinema. The Overseas theatrical distribution and screening rights were bought by CineGalaxy Inc., and the overseas theaters list was released by them on 18 June 2014. As a part of the film's promotion, 100 hoardings featuring the film's posters were used in Hyderabad alone and posters were also used in various bus shelters and were used as bus stickers. The film released in 200 theaters worldwide on 20 June 2014.

== Reception ==
The film received positive reviews from critics. The Hindu gave a review stating "The tussle between a man who, despite all the hand-holding, can make a mess of expressing his love and the man who knows to charm his woman but is restricted by circumstances makes for an engaging watch. Well-written romantic comedies are rare in Telugu cinema. Oohalu Gusagusalade is an exception and a delight." The Times of India gave a review stating "At a run time of 143 minutes, Oohalu Gusagusalaade has just about the right proportion of romance and comedy to call it a film which has its heart at the right place. It's undoubtedly one of the better feel-good-romantic films in recent times" and rated the film 3.5/5. Oneindia Entertainment gave a review stating "Though Oohalu Gusagusalde has simple storyline, Srinivas Avasarala has created fantastic screenplay. The director has good grip on the narration of the whole show. Overall, Oohalu Gusagusalde is a good romantic comedy entertainer and it will impress audience in A centres. Go watch it this weekend" and rated the film 3.5/5. Deccan Chronicle gave a review stating "The climax scene and the comedy routines fall a bit flat, still this breezy romantic entertainer is breath of fresh air. After watching all the regular masala action films, you can watch this film for its clean comedy sans double meaning dialogues" and rated the film 3.5/5. IndiaGlitz gave a review stating "Oohalu Gusa Gusa Lade is an almost flawlessly written screenplay supported by deft execution. It is a rom-com that is high on writing and imaginative in terms of presentation" and rated the film 3.25/5. Sify gave a review stating "Oohalu Gusagusalade is told in lighter manner. It has good writing and crackling romantic scenes with soothing music. The film has good scripting with some witty lines. Overall it is comedy that saves the film."

Apart from critics, prominent celebrities too lauded the film. National Award winning director S. S. Rajamouli and Actor cum Hindupur MLA Nandamuri Balakrishna, actor N. T. Rama Rao Jr. praised the film's director and producer for their efforts. Venkat C. Dileep's cinematography was praised by award-winning cinematographers K. K. Senthil Kumar and P.G. Vinda. While K. K. Senthil Kumar appreciated the beach song for its colors and texture, P. G. Vinda appreciated the night photography.

=== Awards ===
- SIIMA Award for Best Supporting Actor – Telugu - Srinivas Avasarala (2014)
