= Srinivas Avasarala =

Indian actor, director, screenwriter, racquetball player

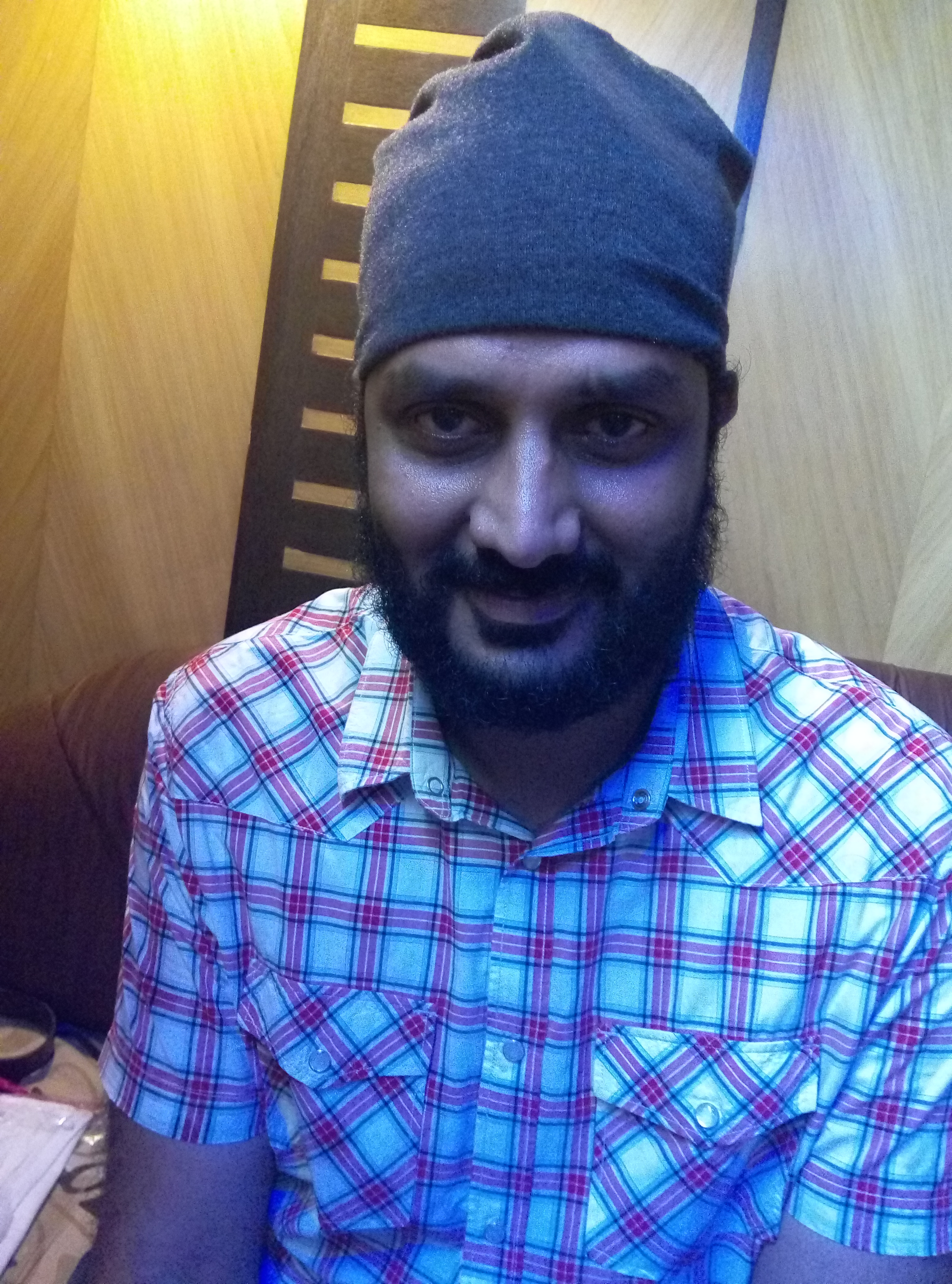
- Avasarala in 2016
- Born: 19 March 1981 (age 45); Kakinada, Andhra Pradesh, India
- Other name: Srini
- Education: University of California, Los Angeles (Diploma in screenwriting); University of North Dakota (M.S.); KL College of Engineering (B. Tech)
- Occupations: Actor; writer; director; racquetball player
- Years active: 2007 – present
- Height: 6 ft 4 in (193 cm)

Srinivas Avasarala (born 19 March 1981) is an Indian actor, film director and screenwriter who works in Telugu cinema. He received two Nandi Awards and a SIIMA Award.

== Early life ==
Srinivas Avasarala was born on 19 March 1981 in Kakinada, Andhra Pradesh, India. His father worked at Andhra Bank. By virtue of his work, they had to travel across different locations. Hence, Avasarala completed his education in 4 cities – Kakinada, Vijayawada, Hyderabad, and Visakhapatnam. He did his B.Tech. in Mechanical Engineering from KL College of Engineering, Vijayawada. Avasarala holds a master's in Mechanical Engineering with focus on Finite Element Analysis from University of North Dakota and worked for Princeton Plasma Physics Laboratory.

He is also a professional racquetball player who represented India in the Racquetball Asian championships.

== Career ==
Avasarala holds a screenwriting diploma from University of California, Los Angeles and took acting classes for a year at Lee Strasberg Theatre and Film Institute, New York City. He did theatre in New York and then worked as an assistant director for a film called Blind Ambition. He also hosted one of the quiz shows, Champion which aired on ETV Telugu for the first season.

He made his acting debut with the film Ashta Chamma- an adaptation of Oscar Wilde's The Importance of Being Earnest. His portrayal of Anand, Algernon in the play, received wide critical acclaim. He made his directorial debut with the Telugu romantic-comedy, Oohalu Gusagusalade (2014). He also essayed the role of Uday Bhaskar in the film which earned him South Indian International Movie Award for Best Supporting Actor. He has essayed character actor roles in works such as Pilla Zamindar, Anthakamundhu Aatharvaatha, and Kanche which won the National Film Award for Best Feature Film in Telugu for that year.

== Filmography ==
=== Films ===
==== As actor ====
Key
†	Denotes films that have not yet been released

As an actor
Year	Title	Role	Notes
2008	Ashta Chamma	Anand	
2010	Orange	Ajay	
2010	Saradaga Kasepu	Srinivas	
2011	Vara Prasad Potti Prasad	Vara Prasad	
2011	Mugguru	Anji	
2011	Pilla Zamindar	Kanna Babu	
2013	Amrutham Chandamamalo	Amrutha Rao	
2013	Adda	Kishore	
2013	Anthaka Mundu Aa Tarvatha	Viswa	
2013	Aravind 2	Film director	
2013	Sukumarudu	ANR	
2013	Chammak Challo	Kishore	
2014	Govindudu Andarivadele	Dr. N. Raju "Nookaraju"	
2014	Oohalu Gusagusalade	Uday Bhaskar	Also writer and director
2015	Jil	Ajay	
2015	Yevade Subramanyam	Prabhakar	
2015	Bandipotu	Cheekati	
2015	Kanche	Das	
2016	Nannaku Prematho	Abhiram's brother	
2016	Raja Cheyyi Vesthe	Chakri	
2016	A Aa	Shekhar Benarjee	
2016	Gentleman	Vamshi	
2016	Oka Manasu	Satya	
2017	Babu Baga Busy	Madhav / Maddy	
2017	Ami Thumi	Vijay	
2017	Meda Meeda Abbayi	CBCID Officer Naresh	
2017	PSV Garuda Vega	Prakash	
2017	Okka Kshanam	Srinivas	
2018	Awe	Shiva	
2018	Mahanati	L. V. Prasad	Cameo appearance
2018	Sammohanam	Himself	Special appearance
2018	Devadas	Rajan	
2018	Antariksham 9000 KMPH	Mohan	
2019	NTR: Kathanayakudu	D. V. Narasa Raju	Cameo appearance
2019	Kathanam	Raghu	
2019	Oorantha Anukuntunnaru	Shiva Raman Iyer	
2020	Nishabdham	Poorna Chandra Rao	Shot simultaneously in Tamil
2020	Silence	Surya Kandasamy	Shot simultaneously in Tamil
2021	Nootokka Jillala Andagadu	Gotti Surya Narayana	Also writer
2022	Aa Ammayi Gurinchi Meeku Cheppali	Dr. Varun	
2023	Pindam	Loknath	
2024	Kismat	Vivek	
2024	Vidya Vasula Aham	Lord Vishnu	
2024	Kalki 2898 AD	Bhairava's proposed buyer	Cameo appearance
2025	Sankranthiki Vasthunam	Satya Akella / Prem	Dual role
2025	Baapu		
2025	Sarangapani Jathakam	Jogeshwar	
2025	Anaganaga	Raja Reddy	
2025	Mowgli	Raju	Special appearance
2026	Papam Prathap	Subrahmanyam	
2026	Korean Kanakaraju	Prithviraju	
2026	Garividi Lakshmi		

==== As director or writer ====
Year	Title	Director	Writer	Notes
2011	Golconda High School	No	Dialogue	
2014	Oohalu Gusagusalade	Yes	Yes	
2016	Jyo Achyutananda	Yes	Yes	
2021	Nootokka Jillala Andagadu	No	Yes	
2022	Brahmāstra	No	Dialogue	Telugu dubbed version
2022	Avatar: The Way of Water	No	Dialogue	Telugu dubbed version
2023	Phalana Abbayi Phalana Ammayi	Yes	Yes	

=== Television ===
Acting roles
Year	Title	Role	Network	Notes	Ref
2019	Mrs. Subbalakshmi	Subramanyam	Zee5	Web debut	
2021	Pitta Kathalu	Harsha	Netflix	Segment: Pinky	
2021	Unheard	Anwar	Disney+ Hotstar		
2025	Constable Kanakam	President Prakash Rao	ETV Win		
2025	Katha Sudha	Dr.Malikarjuna Prasad	ETV Win	Segment: Lekkala Master	

== Awards and nominations ==
South Indian International Movie Awards

- Best Supporting Actor (Telugu) – Oohalu Gusagusalade (2014) – won

Nandi Awards

- Special Jury Award – Oohalu Gusagusalade (2014) – won
- Best Dialogue Writer – Jyo Achyutananda (2016) – won
