= Padmavathi Malladi =

Indian film director (born 1985)

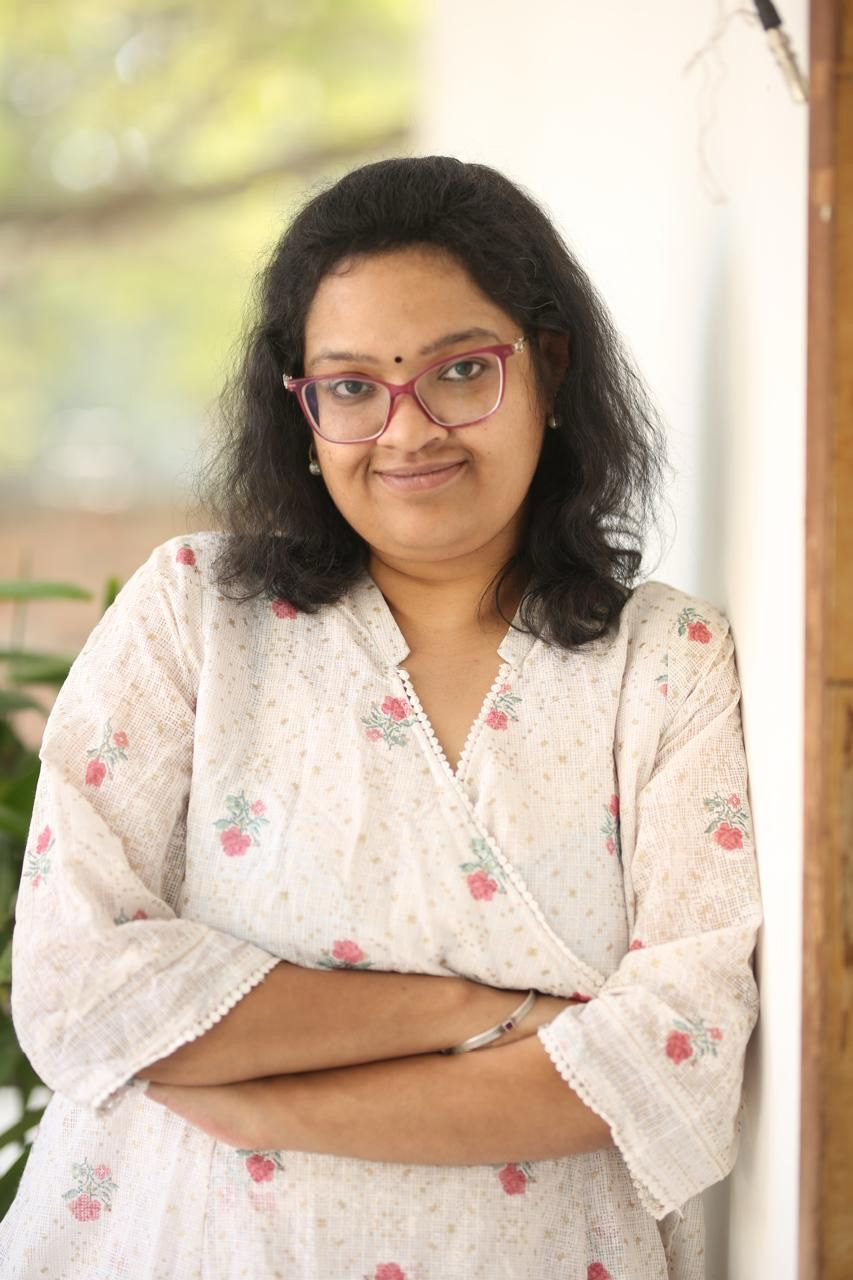
- Padmavathi Malladi at a promotional event for Gandhi Tatha Chettu
- Born: 14 May 1985 (age 41); Hyderabad, Telangana, India
- Education: Villa Marie Degree College
- Occupations: Director; Screenwriter
- Years active: 2013 – present
- Notable work: Gandhi Tatha Chettu (As Director); Mahanati (As Screenwriter); Brinda (As Screenwriter)

Padmavathi Malladi (born 14 May 1985) is an Indian film director and screenwriter who works primarily in Telugu feature films and web series. Known for her forthright dialogues and slice-of-life storytelling, she garnered critical acclaim for her work as a screenwriter for Mahanati (2018), Ammu (2022) and Brinda (2024) for which she was nominated at the 2025 Critics' Choice Awards.

Padmavathi made her directorial debut with Gandhi Tatha Chettu (2024). The film garnered critical acclaim for its production and the performance of its lead actor, Sukriti Veni Bandreddi. The film received numerous accolades nationally and globally, including the Best Child Artist Award for Sukriti at the 71st National Film Awards, Best Film at the 30th Minsk International Film Festival & the 2024 Noida International Film Festival.

Born to academicians in a mixed culture family, Padmavathi developed a fondness for languages and built a strong vocabulary in Telugu at an early age. She started her film career with Chandra Sekhar Yeleti as a writer for Manamantha (2016) starring Mohanlal and Gauthami, before collaborating with Radha Krishna Kumar for Radhe Shyam starring Prabhas and Pooja Hegde which was ultimately released in 2022 having been in production for six years.

== Early life and background ==
Padmavathi was born to Ravoori Saroja and Malladi Jayakrishnan in Hyderabad in May 1985. Born into a family that established and ran many educational institutions in the Greater Hyderabad area, Padmavathi grew up in an extremely disciplined environment. She and her younger sister grew up with her uncle and aunt, as her parents traveled regularly for their jobs.

Padmavathi's family's roots come from Thanjavur and Chittoor, giving rise to a spoken language that was an eclectic mix of Tamil and Telugu. However, in school, Padmavathi found herself getting increasingly attracted to classical Telugu literature. Padmavathi has acknowledged her high school Telugu teacher for playing a significant role in developing her writing and speaking skills in Telugu.

Padmavathi completed her bachelor's degree in biotechnology from Villa Marie College, in Hyderabad, and her MBA in Human Resources from Malla Reddy College. Upon graduation, Padmavathi began her career as an HR lecturer at a management college in Hyderabad. Shortly thereafter, she started her own training institute focusing on Spoken English and certification courses such as Six Sigma and Total Quality Management. She took up writing film reviews for a website, one of which caught the attention of a crew member working on Siraj Kalla's D for Dopidi (2013). He asked Padmavathi to write a few dialogues for the film, and that's how she was introduced to the grammar of dialogue and screenplay writing.

== Film career ==
=== Early beginnings (2014–2016) ===
Padmavathi started writing short stories, one of which reached Radha Krishna Kumar - who at the time was directing Jil (2015) starring Gopichand and Raashi Khanna. He approached Padmavathi to translate the script from Telugu to English, and in the process, Padmavathi provided some storyline inputs. Padmavathi's work also caught the attention of Chandra Sekhar Yeleti, under whom Radha Krishna Kumar worked as an assistant director and the director of Manamantha (2016), who subsequently referred her to the project. She was offered a role as a writer for the film and received significant guidance in screenwriting from Yeleti, whom she regards as her mentor in the film industry. The screenplay of Manamantha was widely praised and became one of the more positively-reviewed films of 2016.

Padmavathi joined forces with Radha Krishna Kumar again in 2016 as he announced Radhe Shyam with Prabhas, produced by UV Creations. The story of the film evolved over the course of many iterations, with Padmavathi growing in experience along with the story.

Around this time, Padmavathi became a part of a filmmakers’ collective being mentored and guided by Aparna Malladi. During this time, Padmavathi was introduced to several individuals, including Venkatesh Maha, Sesha Sindhu Rao, Vamsi Patchipulusu, and Santosh ‘Santo’ Mohan Veeranki, among others. These individuals later made significant contributions to the Telugu film industry in the following years.

==== Mahanati (2018) ====
In late 2016, a biopic on the yesteryear superstar Savitri was announced, and was being helmed by Nag Ashwin - fresh off the success of his directorial debut, Yevade Subramanyam (2015). On the lookout for writers, he came across Padma's work, and tasked her with bringing out the personal life of the most celebrated actress in Telugu Cinema. Padmavathi chanced upon the eponymously titled book "Savitri", and presented a draft of her story and scenes to Nag Ashwin who immediately inducted her into his team.

Padmavathi recalls a moment when Nagi praised her by stating that she has "a unique voice," a commendation she considers a turning point in her writing career. Mahanati, starring Keerthy Suresh, Dulquer Salmaan, Samantha Ruth Prabhu, and Vijay Deverakonda, became a significant success, both critically and commercially. The film won 3 National Awards, 4 Filmfare Awards, and 26 other awards across various platforms regionally, nationally, and internationally.

==== Wider recognition (2018–2020) ====
While writing for Mahanati, Padmavathi became part of a team led by Teja. Produced by D. Suresh Babu, starring Venkatesh, and being written by Paruchuri Brothers and Diamond Rathnambabu, the untitled project garnered a lot of attention, but ultimately did not see a release. Padmavathi considers this experience to be one of the most enlightening of her career, as it provided valuable lessons not only on writing but also on navigating and surviving in the film industry.

In September 2018, Padmavathi collaborated with Sesha Sindhu Rao on the latter's directorial debut, Choosi Choodangaane, a breezy romantic comedy and coming of age film starring debutant Shiva Kandukuri and Varsha Bollamma. Credited as the writer of the film, Padmavathi took the opportunity to also gain significant on-set experience working alongside Sesha Sindhu Rao. She interacted with the actors and the crew, and garnered lessons in filmmaking, crew management and artist management. As part of workshops designed to familiarize actors with the story and their characters, Padmavathi spent extensive time understanding the actors and building rapport with them. This experience played a significant role in shaping her own filmmaking style. Upon its OTT release on Amazon Prime Video during the first COVID-19 lockdown in India, Choosi Choodangaane received praise, particularly for its treatment of characters and its modern storyline that challenged traditional stereotypes.

==== Ammu (2022) and Brinda (2024) ====
In late 2021, Padmavathi was approached by Karthik Subbaraj’s production house - Stone Bench Creations - to work on a film about a domestic abuse victim and her resolve to create a better life for herself. Initially slated to release in Tamil, Prime Video decided to release it in Telugu, and Padmavathi was chosen to write for the same. Aware of the subtle yet conspicuous differences between Tamil and Telugu content, Padmavathi wrote the dialogue draft of the film, and it went on the floors. Recalling her interaction with lead actress Aishwarya Lekshmi regarding the monologue, Padmavathi stated that it was the hardest thing she had ever written - not just from the subject’s point of view, but also from the point of view of the language. The monologue delivered by Aishwarya Lekshmi’s character, apart from the overall dialogues of the film, garnered immense appreciation from viewers and critics alike, and Ammu emerged as one of the "most important films of the year".

In October 2021, Surya Manoj Vangala approached Padmavathi with a story about a police officer battling injustice and crime in the face of longstanding societal beliefs and rituals. Intrigued by the possibilities, Padmavathi and Surya wrote and developed the story into a web-series - Brinda - starring Trisha Krishnan - which released on SonyLIV in August 2024. Trisha Krishnan's portrayal of the titular role, and the nuanced writing that dealt with sensitive topics such as religious crimes was widely lauded. Brinda is credited with being one of the best web-series ushering in the era of Telugu Originals on online platforms. In March 2025, Padmavathi, along with the show's director - Surya Manoj Vangala - was nominated for the Best Writing award for Brinda at the 2025 Critics' Choice Shorts and Series Awards, but lost out to their counterparts who wrote the series Poacher.

=== Breakthrough - directorial debut ===
In early 2021, Padmavathi developed a story about a young boy who plants a tree. Though the initial suggestions came from her good friend, Venkat Karnati, she was instantly enamored with the story, and developed it until it ultimately became the story of a 15 year old girl who uses Gandhian principles to rally her village, and save them and her grandfather’s tree from being chopped off by corporate entities looking to further their greed. Entitling it as "Gandhi Tatha Chettu", Padmavathi began narrating the story to producers across the industry. Unwilling to take the risk of having a child actor as the lead of the film, most producers passed it off.

Padma's frequent collaborator, Sesha Sindhu Rao agreed to produce the film, and in an unconventional, but ultimately fruitful, move, decided to finance the film through an online funding platform - Cinema Stock Exchange - raising $114,000 (INR 85 Lakhs) to get the film on the floors.

Sindhu also led Padmavathi to cast Sukriti Bandreddi - daughter of celebrated Telugu Film Director, Sukumar in the leading role. Upon hearing the film's story, Sukumar agreed to have his daughter Sukriti be cast in the main role. Sukriti proved to be a revelation as the film went on to receive numerous accolades all over the world at Film Festivals, especially garnering immense praise for her portrayal of a young girl putting Gandhian values into practice.

Padmavathi Malladi's directorial debut - Gandhi Tatha Chettu - released theatrically on 24 January 2025, and received widespread acclaim for its writing, direction and acting. The film was subsequently released on Amazon Prime Video in March 2025.

In June 2025, the film was honoured with the "Bronze Knight" Award at the prestigious Zolotoy Vityaz Film Festival in Moscow, Russia. On August 1, 2025, Sukriti Veni Bandreddi was bestowed upon with the prestigious National Film Award for Best Child Artist at the 71st National Film Awards.

== Other Appearances ==
Padmavathi has appeared as a guest on Telugu Film Industry based podcasts such as "Kathala Kacheri" and "The Unscripted Podcast (TUP)".

== Style of writing and direction ==
As a writer, Padmavathi Malladi is recognized for her impactful dialogues in serious societal and social topics. At the same time, she is also known for her comical style of writing which plays to her advantage in slice of life films as evidenced in Choosi Choodangaane and Gandhi Tatha Chettu.

As a director, Padmavathi is known to be a hands-on guide. She has stated that for the best version of the story to come out, it is crucial for directors to get on the same page and get the actors to emote, since the actors are the vehicle to get the writers’ and directors’ ideas out in the open.

== Filmography ==
=== Films ===
Year	Title	Director	Screenwriter	Dialogues	Notes
2016	Manamantha	No	Yes	No	First Film as Screenwriter
2018	Mahanati	No	Yes	Yes	See List of Accolades Received by Mahanati
2020	Choosi Choodangaane	No	Yes	Yes	
2022	Radhe Shyam	No	Yes	No	
2022	Ammu	No	Yes	Yes	
2025	Gandhi Tatha Chettu	Yes	Yes	Yes	National Film Award for Best Child Artist, 71st National Film Awards Bronze Knight, Zolotoy Vityaz Film Festival 2025 Best Film, 30th Minsk International Film Festival 2024

=== Web series ===
Year	Title	Director	Screenwriter	Dialogues	Notes
2024	Brinda	No	Yes	Yes	Co-written with Surya Mohan Vangala Nominated for Best Writing at the 2025 Critics Choice Shorts and Series Awards
