= Nandi Awards of 2016 =

Indian Telugu film and TV awards ceremony

Nandi Awards for the year 2016 were announced by Andhra Pradesh Government on 14 November 2017. Both Janatha Garage and Sathamanam Bhavati emerged as big winners, with 6 awards each for the year. The NTR National award for the year was conferred on actor Rajinikanth.

The Awards Ceremony was held in Amaravati.

== Winners list ==
Category	Winner	Film	Nandi Type
Best Feature Film	Raj Kandukuri; Yash Rangineni	Pelli Choopulu	Gold
Second Best Feature Film	M. Ravi Kumar	Arddhanaari	Silver
Third Best Feature Film	Gurajala Jagan Mohan	Manalo Okkadu	Bronze
Best Actor	Jr. NTR	Janatha Garage; Nannaku Prematho	Silver
Best Director	Satish Vegesna	Sathamanam Bhavati	Silver
Best Actress	Ritu Varma	Pelli Choopulu	Silver
Best Supporting Actor	Mohanlal	Janatha Garage	Copper
Best Supporting Actress	Jayasudha	Sathamanam Bhavati	Copper
Best Character Actor	Naresh	Sathamanam Bhavati	Copper
Best Male Comedian	Saptagiri	Express Raja	Copper
Best Female Comedian	Pragathi	Kalyana Vaibhogame	Copper
Best Villain	Aadhi Pinisetty	Sarrainodu	Copper
Best Cinematographer	Sameer Reddy	Sathamanam Bhavati	Copper
Best Music Director	Mickey J. Meyer	Sathamanam Bhavati	Copper
Best Editor	Naveen Nooli	Nannaku Prematho	Copper
Best Art Director	A. S. Prakash	Janatha Garage	Copper
Best Screenplay Writer	Ravikanth Perepu; Adivi Sesh	Kshanam	Copper
Best Story Writer	Koratala Siva	Janatha Garage	Copper
Best Dialogue Writer	Srinivas Avasarala	Jo Achyutananda	Copper
Best Lyricist	Ramajogayya Sastry	Janatha Garage	Copper
Nandi Award for Akkineni Award for best home-viewing feature film	Dil Raju	Sathamanam Bhavati	Silver
Best Popular Film for Providing Wholesome Entertainment	Naveen Yerneni, Y. Ravi Shankar, and C. V. Mohan	Janatha Garage	Gold
Best Children's Film			Gold
Best Documentary Film			Gold
Best Film Critic on Telugu Cinema			Copper
Sarojini Devi Award for a Film on National Integration		No Entry	Gold
Best Male Playback Singer	Vandemataram Srinivas	Dandakaranyam	Copper
Best Female Playback Singer	Chinmayi	Kalyana Vaibhogame	Copper
Best Child Actor	Maikhel Gandhi	Supreme	Copper
Best Child Actress	Raina Rao	Manamantha	Copper
Best First Film of a Director	Kalyan Krishna Kurasala	Soggade Chinni Nayana	Copper
Best Choreographer	Raju Sundaram	Janatha Garage	Copper
Best Audiographer	E. Radhakrishna	Sarrainodu	Copper
Best Costume Designer	A. Tirumaleswara Rao	Sri Chilukuru Balaji	Copper
Best Makeup Artist	Ranjith	Arddhanaari	Copper
Best Fight Master	Venkat	Supreme	Copper
Best Special Effects	FireFly	Soggade Chinni Nayana	Copper
Best Male Dubbing Artist	Vasu	Arddhanaari	Copper
Best Female Dubbing Artist	Lipsika	Ekkadiki Pothavu Chinnavada	Copper
Nandi Award for Best Book on Telugu Cinema (Books, posters, etc.)			Copper
Special Jury Award	Nani	Gentleman	Copper
Special Jury Award	Chandra Sekhar Yeleti	Manamantha	Copper
Special Jury Award	Saagar K Chandra	Appatlo Okadundevadu	Copper

== See also ==
- Nandi Awards of 2015
