= Ritu Varma =

Indian actress

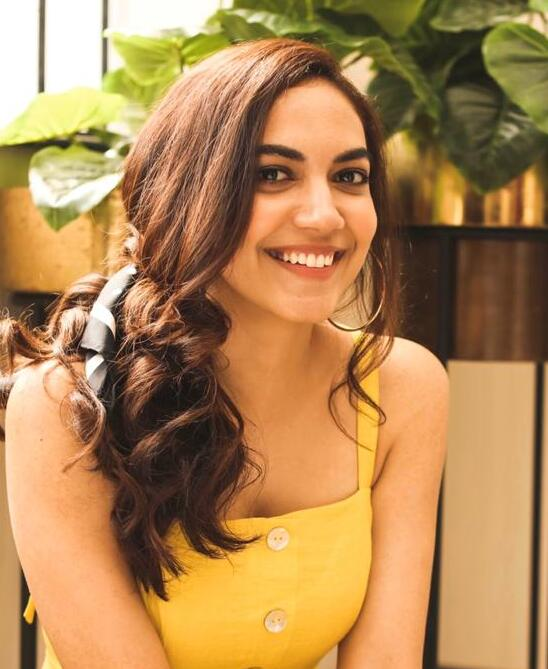
- Ritu in 2019
- Born: 10 March 1990 (age 36); Hyderabad, Andhra Pradesh, India (now in Telangana, India)
- Education: Malla Reddy Engineering College
- Occupation: Actress
- Years active: 2013–present

Ritu Varma (born 10 March 1990) is an Indian actress who works in Telugu and Tamil films. After appearing in short films and supporting roles, Varma played the lead role in the Telugu film Pelli Choopulu (2016), for which she received the Nandi Award for Best Actress and the Filmfare Critics Award for Best Actress – Telugu. She has appeared in several commercially successful films such as Yevade Subramanyam (2015), Kannum Kannum Kollaiyadithaal (2020), Oke Oka Jeevitham (2022) and Mark Antony (2023).

== Early life and work ==
Ritu Varma was born and brought up in Hyderabad in a North Indian family. Her father is from Madhya Pradesh and she speaks Hindi at home. She is fluent in Telugu and does her own dubbing for her Telugu films.

She did her intermediate from Villa Marie College for Women, Hyderabad and holds a bachelor's degree in engineering from Malla Reddy Engineering College. After completing her graduation, she took part in the Miss Hyderabad Beauty pageant and was declared the first runner-up.

== Career ==
Varma started her career with her performance in the Telugu short film Anukokunda. The short film won the Best Film award at the 48HR Film Project competition in 2012 and also fetched Varma the Best Actor (Female) award. The short film was later screened at the Cannes Short Film Corner in 2013. Her first feature film was Baadshah where she played a supporting role of Pinky. She signed her next film as a lead Prema Ishq Kaadhal in which she played the role of a costume designer Sameera opposite Sree Vishnu. Sebsequently, she appeared in Naa Rakumarudu (2014), which was followed by Yevade Subramanyam (2015), for which she received IIFA Utsavam Award for Best Supporting Actress – Telugu nomination.

Varma had her career breakthrough with the 2016 film Pelli Choopulu. She played Chitra, an entrepreneur opposite Vijay Deverakonda. The film was a box office success, and won her the Nandi Award for Best Actress and Filmfare Critics Award for Best Actress – Telugu. Suhas Yellapantula noted, "Ritu is simply delightful as Chitra. The way she carries herself as a fiercely independent lady is a treat to watch." In 2017, she appeared in Keshava opposite Nikhil Siddharth and had a cameo in Velaiilla Pattadhari 2.

In 2020, Varma played Madhu, a con artist in Kannum Kannum Kollaiyadithaal opposite Dulquer Salmaan, which emerged a commercial success. Sreedhar Pillai called her comeback "terrific" and appreciated her performance in the climax. She then appeared in a segment of Putham Pudhu Kaalai. In 2021, Varma first appeared in Ninnila Ninnila alongside Ashok Selvan and Nithya Menen. She then starred opposite Nani in Tuck Jagadish. She then played a businesswoman Bhoomi in Varudu Kaavalenu opposite Naga Shaurya. Sangeetha Devi Dundoo stated, "It is one of the better roles given to Ritu in recent times and she carries it off gracefully."

In 2022, her first release was the anthology Modern Love Hyderabad. She next played Vaishnavi in the bilingual Oke Oka Jeevitham opposite Sharwanand,which was a box office success. Balakrishna Ganeshan stated, "Ritu does not have much of a role, but she manages to do her part fairly well." She later appeared opposite Ashok Selvan in Nitham Oru Vaanam. Her first release of 2023 was Mark Antony opposite Vishal, which was commercially successful. She then appeared in the anthology Modern Love Chennai.

In her only film of 2024, Varma played dual roles of Queen Rukmini Devi and Anubhuti opposite Sree Vishnu in Swag. In 2025, she played Meera, whose aunt falls for her lover's father opposite Sundeep Kishan in Mazaka. Her much delayed film Dhruva Natchathiram, opposite Vikram, is set to release in 2025.

== Filmography ==
Key
| † | Denotes films that have not yet been released |

=== Films ===
| Year | Title | Role | Language | Notes | Ref. |
|---|---|---|---|---|---|
| 2013 | Baadshah | Pinky | Telugu | Debut film | |
| 2013 | Prema Ishq Kaadhal | Sameera | Telugu | Debut as Lead actress | |
| 2014 | Naa Rakumarudu | Bindu | Telugu | | |
| 2015 | Yevade Subramanyam | Riya | Telugu | | |
| 2016 | Pelli Choopulu | Chitra | Telugu | | |
| 2017 | Keshava | Sathyabhama | Telugu | | |
| 2017 | Velaiilla Pattadhari 2 | Anitha | Tamil | Tamil Debut | |
| 2020 | Kannum Kannum Kollaiyadithaal | Meera / Madhumitha "Madhu" / Ishita | Tamil | Debut as lead actress in Tamil | |
| 2020 | Putham Pudhu Kaalai | Kanna | Tamil | Released on Amazon Prime Video; Segment: "Avarum Naanum-Avalum Naanum" | |
| 2021 | Ninnila Ninnila | Tara/Amara | Telugu | Released on ZEEPLEX | |
| 2021 | Tuck Jagadish | V.R.O Gummadi Varalakshmi | Telugu | Released on Amazon Prime Video | |
| 2021 | Varudu Kaavalenu | Bhoomika "Bhoomi" | Telugu | | |
| 2022 | Oke Oka Jeevitham | Vaishnavi | Telugu | Bilingual film | |
| 2022 | Kanam | Vaishnavi | Tamil | Bilingual film | |
| 2022 | Nitham Oru Vaanam | Subhadra "Subha" | Tamil | | |
| 2023 | Mark Antony | Ramya | Tamil | | |
| 2024 | Swag | Queen Vinjamara Rukmini Devi / Sagunaka Anubhuti | Telugu | Dual role | |
| 2025 | Mazaka | Meera | Telugu | | |
| 2026 | Dhruva Natchathiram † | TBA | Tamil | Awaiting release | |
| TBA | Gopichand 33 † | TBA | Telugu | Filming | |

=== Web series ===
| Year | Title | Role | Language | Network | Notes | Ref. |
|---|---|---|---|---|---|---|
| 2022 | Modern Love Hyderabad | Renuka "Renu" | Telugu | Amazon Prime Video | Segment: "Fuzzy, Purple and full of Thorns" | |
| 2023 | Modern Love Chennai | Mallika | Tamil | Amazon Prime Video | Segment: "Kaadhal Enbadhu Kannula Heart Irukkura Emoji" | |
| 2025 | Devika & Danny | Devika | Telugu | JioHotstar | | |

== Awards and nominations ==
| Year | Award | Category | Title | Result | Ref. |
|---|---|---|---|---|---|
| 2016 | IIFA Utsavam | Best Supporting Actress – Telugu | Yevade Subramanyam | Nominated | |
| 2017 | Nandi Awards | Best Actress | Pelli Choopulu | Won | |
| 2017 | Filmfare Awards South | Best Actress Critics – Telugu | Pelli Choopulu | Won | |
| 2017 | Filmfare Awards South | Best Actress – Telugu | Pelli Choopulu | Nominated | |
| 2017 | IIFA Utsavam | Best Actress – Telugu | Pelli Choopulu | Nominated | |
| 2017 | South Indian International Movie Awards | Best Actress – Telugu | Pelli Choopulu | Nominated | |
| 2021 | South Indian International Movie Awards | Best Female Debut – Tamil | Kannum Kannum Kollaiyadithaal | Won | |
