= Breakup song (disambiguation) =

A breakup song is a song describing the breakup of an intimate relationship.

Breakup Song may also refer to:

- Breakup Song (album), a 2012 album by Deerhoof, includes the track "Breakup Songs"
- "The Breakup Song (They Don't Write 'Em)", a 1981 song by the Greg Kihn Band
- "The Breakup Song" (Francesca Battistelli song), 2018 song
- "Break Up Song" (Little Mix song), 2020 song
- "Break Up Song", a 2009 song by R&B female vocal group Jada
- "Breakup Song", a song by Hiphop Tamizha from the 2020 Indian film Naan Sirithal
- "The Breakup Song", a song from the 2016 Indian film soundtrack Ae Dil Hai Mushkil (soundtrack)
- "The Breakup Song", a song by Radhan and Revanth from the 2018 Indian film soundtrack Arjun Reddy
- "The Breakup Song", a 2003 song by American Hi-Fi on their album The Art of Losing

== See also ==
- "Potential Breakup Song", a 2006 song by Aly & AJ
- Break Up (disambiguation) § Music
