= Chamallamudi =

- Village
- Interactive map of Chamallamudi
- Location in Andhra Pradesh, India
- Coordinates: 16°12′49″N 80°25′42″E
- Country: India
- State: Andhra Pradesh
- District: Guntur
- Mandal: Vatticherukuru

Population (2011)
  - Total: 2,919

Languages
  - Official: Telugu
- Time zone: UTC+5:30 (IST)

Chamallamudi is a village in Vatticherukuru mandal, in Guntur district of Andhra Pradesh, India. As of 2011 Census of India, the total population of the village was 2,919.

== Temples ==
1. GangaParvathi Sametha Chandrasekhara Swami Temple
2. Seetha Ramanjaneswami Temple
3. Addemkamma Temple
