= Sai Korrapati =

Indian film producer and distributor

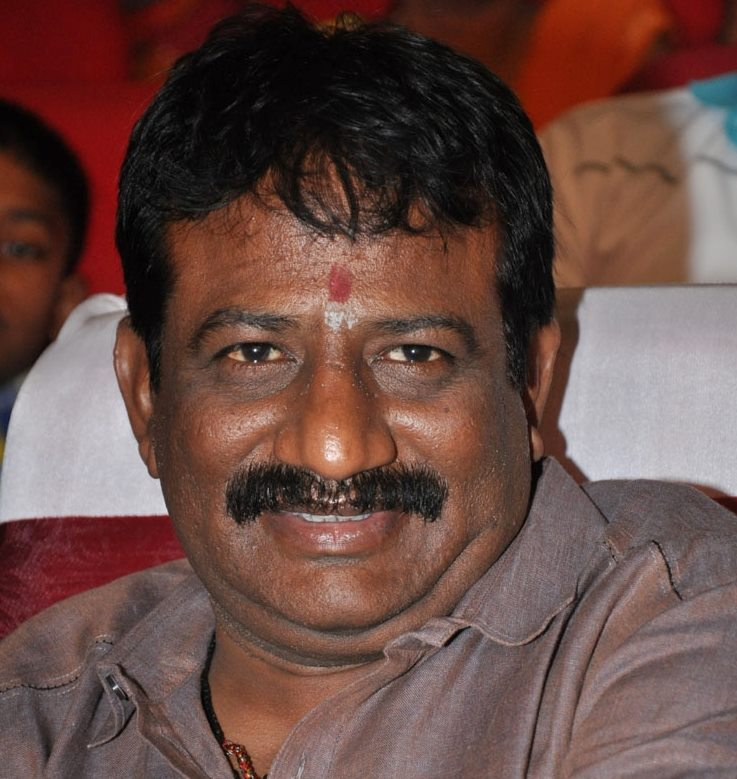
- Born: Sai Korrapati; 19 June 1968 (age 57); Pallapadu, Andhra Pradesh, India
- Occupation(s): Film Producer; Film Distributor
- Spouse: Rajani Korrapati

Sai Korrapati is an Indian film producer and distributor who works predominantly in Telugu cinema .

== Early life and career ==
He is born in Pallapadu. He ventured into Telugu film distribution in 1999 with Seetaramaraju. He owns a theatre Radhika in his home town Bellary. He distributed blockbuster movies in Telugu film for over fifty feature films. He ventured into film production with Lahiri Lahiri Lahirilo. He is an angel investor in Sillymonks, PGO, Nalgonda Eagles in Telangana Premier Kabaddi. In 2012, he founded the film production company Vaaraahi Chalana Chitram.

== Filmography ==
| Year | Title |
|---|---|
| 2012 | Eega |
| 2012 | Andala Rakshasi |
| 2014 | Legend |
| 2014 | Oohalu Gusagusalade |
| 2014 | Dikkulu Choodaku Ramayya |
| 2015 | Tungabhadra |
| 2015 | Raju Gari Gadhi |
| 2015 | Jatha Kalise |
| 2016 | Raja Cheyyi Vesthe |
| 2016 | Manamantha |
| 2016 | Jyo Achyutananda |
| 2017 | Patel S. I. R. |
| 2017 | Rendu Rellu Aaru |
| 2017 | Yuddham Sharanam |
| 2018 | Vijetha |
| 2019 | NTR: Kathanayakudu |
| 2019 | NTR: Mahanayakudu |
| 2021 | Thellavarithe Guruvaram |
| 2022 | Bhala Thandanana |
| 2023 | Ustaad |
| 2025 | Junior |

== Film distribution ==
| Year | Title |
|---|---|
| 1999 | Seetharama Raju |
| 2000 | Lahiri Lahiri Lahirilo |
| 2013 | Dhoom 3 |
| 2014 | Lingaa |
| 2015 | Baahubali: The Beginning |
| 2017 | Baahubali 2: The Conclusion |
| 2018 | K.G.F: Chapter 1 |
| 2022 | K.G.F: Chapter 2 |

== Awards ==
- National Film Award for Best Feature Film in Telugu- Eega (2012)
- Filmfare Best Film Award (Telugu) - Eega (2012)
- SIIMA Award for Best Film (Telugu) - Eega (2012)
