= Brinda (TV series) =

Indian web TV series

- Genre: Crime; Thriller
- Screenplay by: Surya Manoj Vangala; Padmavathi Malladi
- Story by: Surya Manoj Vangala
- Directed by: Surya Manoj Vangala
- Starring: Trisha Krishnan; Indrajith Sukumaran; Ravindra Vijay
- Composer: Shakthikanth Karthick
- Country of origin: India
- Original language: Telugu
- No. of seasons: 1
- No. of episodes: 8

Production
- Executive producer: Ramesh Chand
- Producer: Kolla Ashish
- Cinematography: Dinesh K Babu
- Editor: Anwar Ali
- Running time: 38–48 minutes
- Production companies: Adding Advertising LLP; And Stories

Original release
- Network: SonyLIV
- Release: 1 August 2024 – present

Brinda is an Indian Telugu-language crime thriller television series written and directed by Surya Manoj Vangala. Produced by Adding Advertising LLP and And Stories, starring Trisha Krishnan, Indrajith Sukumaran and Ravindra Vijay in important roles, it premiered on SonyLIV on 2 August 2024. In September 2025, the show was renewed for a second season.

== Cast ==
- Trisha Krishnan as SI K. Brinda
- Indrajith Sukumaran as Prof. Kabir Anand/Satya "Satchi"; Brinda's elder brother.
  - Rakendu Mouli as Young Satya "Sachi"
- Ravindra Vijay as SI N. Sarathi, Brinda's trusted colleague
- Aamani as Vasundhara; Brinda's adopted mother
- Jayaprakash as SI Raghu; Brinda's adopted father
- Anish Kuruvilla as DIG
- Koteswar Rao as ACP
- Anandsami as Thakur, Kabir's trusted friend and aid
- Yashna Muthuluri as Naina "Chutki"; Brinda's adopted younger sister
- Allu Ramesh
- Srinivas Poldasu
- Goparaju Vijay as CI Solomon
- Muralidhar Goud as Postmortem Surgeon
- Jwala Koti

== Production ==
In October 2021, the series was announced on SonyLIV. The makers of the series arranged a muhurtam puja. Trisha Krishnan was cast in the titular role in what also happens to be her OTT debut. The principal photography of the series started in mid-October 2021. In April 2022, Indrajith Sukumaran was confirmed to be a part of the cast, in a pivotal role. The filming of the series concluded in November 2022. The teaser was released on 8 July 2024, followed by the trailer of the series.

== Episodes ==
No. overall	No. in season	Title	Directed by	Written by	Original release date
1	1	"The Chosen One"	Surya Manoj Vangala	Surya Manoj Vangala and Padmavathi Malladi	2 August 2024
In 1996, Saachi and Chinni wander the Gangavaram Forest and reach the village where a man died in a mysterious way. A priest proposes to sacrifice Chinni to reduce the anger of the goddess to prevent further deaths. At night Chinni's mother, Shantamma plans to leave the village with Chinni and Satya / Saachi. Shantamma manages to help Chinni escape in a lorry before getting caught by the villagers and Satya gets lost in the forest. At present Chinni / Brinda lives with her adoptive family and works as a sub-inspector of police. Brinda's modern sister, Chutki, doesn't like Brinda. A dead body is found and Brinda suspects murder which is confirmed by the forensic report. With Brinda's help, the victim is identified as Thilak but the corrupt inspector, Solomon, doesn't want to investigate further. However, Brinda investigates and finds a large feather of a vulture which clarifies the unidentified bite marks on Thilak's body. Satya feeds a vulture named Jaaji.
2	2	"A Little Deeper"	Surya Manoj Vangala	Surya Manoj Vangala and Padmavathi Malladi	2 August 2024
In 1996 after Chinni's escape, one of the villagers offered her daughter for the sacrifice. The priest burns the girl alive and kills Shantamma in front of Satya who believes Chinni was sacrificed. Satya burns down the whole village. At present, Brinda visits Basheer's place to know more about the feather but Basheer is unavailable. Brinda talks to Thilak's wife and Thilak's daughter, Veena. Brinda also inquires at Thilak's workplace. Brinda continues to get nightmares of her childhood memories. At school, Chutki smokes with her friends. In 1996 at Warangal police check post, the police found Chinni in a lorry. At present, Brinda continues to investigate Thilak's murder and finds three similar cases. With all the evidence collected by Brinda, Solomon talks to higher officials and a special investigation team (SIT) is formed without Brinda to catch the serial killer. Satya kidnaps another man.
3	3	"Hit and Miss"	Surya Manoj Vangala	Surya Manoj Vangala and Padmavathi Malladi	2 August 2024
In 1996, Satya was held in juvenile prison for killing the villagers. At present, Satya kills another man. Sub-Inspector Sarathi talks to the Assistant Commissioner of Police (ACP) in order to remove Solomon from SIT and to include Brinda in SIT. The SIT finds eleven more similar cases but unable to find any clues, patterns and connections. Satya dumps the victim's body and is mistakenly arrested by police for consuming weed. Chutki / Naina meets Rishi at a party. In the past, Brinda didn't like to live with Raghu's family when Raghu and Vasu adopted Brinda. At present, Brinda visits Basheer and Basheer explains about the Vulture and Kehkliya Tribe in Uttar Pradesh who worshipped that Vulture. Brinda investigates the missing case of Abdul and finds the place where Satya killed the last victim. The evidence at the crime scene leads to Anand, a lecturer who also runs an NGO.
4	4	"The Bridge in Between"	Surya Manoj Vangala	Surya Manoj Vangala and Padmavathi Malladi	2 August 2024
Anand's father, Kamal Anand, was a senior advocate and money minded. Sarathi and Brinda question Anand but are unable to find any leads. Brinda is suspicious and follows Anand. Chutki is irregular at school and grows close to Rishi. Sarathi locates the place where Satya dumped the last victim. Brinda talks with Anand and goes with Anand to the college where Anand works as a guest professor. Satya is released by the police. In the past, Raghu bonds with Brinda. Raghu was killed while trying to rescue a girl. At present, the police find Abdul's dead body and Kamal Anand is also killed in the similar pattern.
5	5	"Light at the End of the Tunnel"	Surya Manoj Vangala	Surya Manoj Vangala and Padmavathi Malladi	2 August 2024
The death of Kamal Anand gets a big media reach. Rishi, Chutki and their friends are held by Solomon after finding alcohol and drugs in the car. Brinda gets into a fight with Solomon. ACP includes Solomon in SIT in exchange for Chutki's release and suspends Brinda. Sarathi and Brinda argue. Sarathi's wife Lekha is pregnant but Sarathi argues with Lekha before Lekha could share the pregnancy result with Sarathi. Brinda and Chutki argue. Vasu consoles Brinda and Brinda apologizes to Anand. Brinda and Sarathi check the CCTV camera near the place where Abdul's body was found and find about Satya's mistaken arrest. Brinda and Sarathi get Satya's fingerprints from the police station where Satya was mistakenly arrested. Satya's fingerprints lead to Thakur who was arrested for a murder in a village named Jwalapur. Brinda and Sarathi reach Jwalapur and Brinda apologizes to Sarathi. One of the villagers, Janardhan, explains everything about Thakur to Brinda and Sarathi. Brinda finds out that the serial killer kills the victims and replaces the victims at work to commit mass murders. Brinda also finds out that the serial killer's motive is to kill people who believe in God. It is revealed that Anand is actually Satya and the other man is Thakur. It is also revealed that Satya and Thakur meet at the juvenile prison.
6	6	"The Beginning of the End"	Surya Manoj Vangala	Surya Manoj Vangala and Padmavathi Malladi	2 August 2024
In the past at the Juvenile Prison, Satya consoles and befriends Thakur. At present, Brinda explains everything to the SIT. The police search for Thakur and create a wanted poster by sketching Thakur's face. It is revealed that Satya runs the NGO with the people who don't believe in God. Brinda and Sarathi visit Anand to get any leads but Anand gives misinformation. Rishi hits Chutki and Brinda threatens Rishi. Brinda and Chutki reconcile their differences. Sarathi sees Lekha's pregnancy result. Brinda proposes a plan which is approved by ACP. In a press conference, ACP explains everything and Brinda vows to kill Thakur. Thakur sees the news and wants to kill Brinda but Satya sends Thakur away with Srinath. While Srinath goes to buy food, Thakur takes the vehicle and arrives at Brinda's house. The police chase Thakur and Sarathi kills Thakur before Thakur could kill Brinda.
7	7	"The Holy Past"	Surya Manoj Vangala	Surya Manoj Vangala and Padmavathi Malladi	2 August 2024
In the past, Satya passed the exams with distinction. At present, Brinda wakes up in a hospital and ACP congratulates Brinda for solving the case. Brinda is suspicious that someone is behind Thakur. From the Juvenile Prison, Sarathi and Brinda find information about Satya. Raghu signed as a guardian to bring Satya out of Juvenile Prison. Brinda confronts Vasu and Vasu informs that Satya is Brinda's brother. In the past, Raghu finds out that Satya is Brinda's brother but Vasu doesn't want Brinda to know about Satya considering Satya as a criminal. Raghu gets Satya out of Juvenile Prison and Satya promises to come back to get Thakur out of Juvenile Prison. Raghu funds Satya's studies and places Satya in a hostel. The hostel warden's daughter dies after being beaten up at a temple. Satya is emotionally affected and Raghu consoles Satya. Satya bonds with Raghu and becomes a better person. Satya and Raghu go to save a girl but a group of religious men kill Raghu and the girl in front of Satya and stab Satya. At present after knowing the truth about Satya, Brinda gets emotional and Satya plans to do something big.
8	8	"Home Coming"	Surya Manoj Vangala	Surya Manoj Vangala and Padmavathi Malladi	2 August 2024
In the past, Satya wakes up in a hospital and learns about Raghu's death. Satya starts to gather people who don't believe in God and starts to kill people who believe in God. Satya brings Thakur out of Juvenile Prison and Satya and Thakur continue to kill and commit mass murders. At present, Brinda informs about Satya to the SIT and the police look for Satya. Meanwhile, Satya evacuates the NGO and proceeds with his plan. Brinda finds out that Anand is already dead and understands that Anand is actually Satya. Brinda tracks Satya's car and the SIT reaches a temple in Gangavaram. During a religious gathering, the devotees take a holy dip in the water in the temple and Satya plans to kill the devotees by replacing the water with a flammable substance. Satya's men hold ACP at gunpoint. The police try to evacuate the devotees and Brinda searches for Satya. Brinda finds and makes Satya realize that Brinda is actually Chinni and Raghu had tried to reunite the siblings. Brinda couldn't convince Satya to stop. Therefore, Brinda kills Satya and stops Satya's plan.

== Reception ==
Avinash Ramachandran of The Indian Express gave the series 3/5 stars. Divya Raje Bhonsale of Mathrubhumi rated the series 3/5 stars. The series was reviewed by Neeshita Nyayapati for Hindustan Times and Sangeetha Devi Dundoo for The Hindu.
