= Ammu (2022 film) =

2022 film directed by Charukesh Sekar

- Official release poster
- Directed by: Charukesh Sekar
- Written by: Story and Screenplay: Charukesh Sekar Dialogues: Padmavathi Malladi
- Produced by: Karthik Subbaraj; Kalyan Subramaniam; Kaarthekeyen Santhanam
- Starring: Aishwarya Lekshmi; Naveen Chandra; Bobby Simha
- Cinematography: Apoorva Anil Shaligram
- Edited by: Radha Sridhar
- Music by: Bharath Sankar
- Production company: Stone Bench Films
- Distributed by: Amazon Prime Video
- Release date: 19 October 2022
- Running time: 136 minutes
- Country: India
- Language: Telugu

Ammu (transl. Selling) is a 2022 Indian Telugu-language drama thriller film written and directed by Charukesh Sekar and produced by Stone Bench Films. The film features Aishwarya Lekshmi, Naveen Chandra, and Bobby Simha in primary roles and premiered on Amazon Prime Video on 19 October 2022.

== Plot ==
Amudha alias Ammu marries her neighbor Ravindranath alias Ravi, who works as a police inspector. The newlyweds arrive at Maharanipalli, where Ravi is the Circle Inspector of Police at the Maharanipalli station. The couple seem to have a great life ahead as both love and support one another, but things take a turn when Ravi slowly starts to become harsh, passive aggressive, manipulative, and cruel with Ammu, occasionally shouting at her and embarrassing her in front of his colleagues. The situation worsens when Ravi slaps Ammu for perceived backtalking to him on a small matter, while Ammu's parents were visiting them at Maharanipalli. Even though Ravi pacifies Ammu by apologizing, it is evident that he does not regret the slapping but just wants Ammu to not reveal this to her parents. Ammu later confides in her mother Kalpana that Ravi slapped her and asks her mother what she should do. Her mother tells her that she should do what she feels right. Ammu decides to keep quiet and bear with the unreasonable and cruel domestic torture from Ravi, in the hope that maybe if she invokes enough love in him, he will stop hurting her. Though she is fed up with getting abused by Ravi and wants to end their relationship, she cannot do so because of fear and embarrassment.

Ravi wants Ammu to conceive because his colleague's wife conceived and everyone was congratulating him. Ammu does not want to bring a child into this abusive home, so she takes contraceptive pills. However, she gets pregnant, possibly because Ravi was secretly swapping her pills. This puts Ammu in a worse emotional situation. She seeks help from Ravi's colleagues Satya and Iqbal and her neighbor Linny, and they take her to the office of DIG Reddy, Ravi's superior officer, so that she can file a complaint about Ravi's domestic violence. However, Ravi spots Ammu before she could reach Reddy and manipulates her into admitting before Satya that he never hit her. Satya, Iqbal, and Linny want to help her but are helpless as Ammu has let go of the one opportunity to complain to Reddy. However, Ammu tells them that she has not given up hope and shall wait for the right opportunity to strike back. She tells them that she wants Ravi to admit before everyone that he has abused her, and then she wants to walk away from him with pride.

As Ammu searches for a solution, Prabhu Das comes to the Maharanipalli police station on parole to attend his sister Geetha's wedding. Prabhu had been sent to prison for killing two men, and Geetha holds a grudge against him for that and refuses to forgive him despite his efforts. At the police station, however, Ravi harasses Prabhu, asking him to do unnecessary chores. Prabhu rebels one day, leading the cancellation of his parole. Ammu learns that Ravi will get into trouble if Prabhu misses any of his meetings at the station. So she, Sathya, Linny, and Iqbal secretly hide him in her home from Ravi. This wreaks havoc on the police station and on Ravi's life, as many people, including Geetha and her fiancé protest for Prabhu's release. Later, because of this, Ravi is suspended. Meanwhile, Ammu also goes to Reddy and complains directly of Ravi's domestic abuse. She also hands over a voice recording of Ravi talking to Ammu in a threatening manner and admitting that he indeed habitually abuses her, which was recorded by her using the same secret voice recorder with which Ravi used to spy on her while she was at home. Ravi is arrested, and it is implied that he will soon lose his job. Linny soon takes Prabhu back to the police station, where he finally receives his sister's forgiveness before being imprisoned again. Ammu and Prabhu exchange pleasantries and go their separate ways. She and Linny discuss the future. Linny remarks that Ammu will not be a bad person even if she decides to abort the child conceived out of marital rape by Ravi. Ammu says she knows it.

It is not revealed what Ammu chose to do with the baby, but the movie ends with Ammu being on her way to her own home and happily sharing a biryani with the beggar at the Maharanipalli bus station, with whom she had shared her woes on an earlier day. She asks the beggar why he had not earlier told her to not return to Ravi even when he knew she was erring in deciding to return to Ravi. The beggar tells her he did not tell her anything because whether the decision was right or wrong, it had to be her decision. The film closes on a note of hope.

== Cast ==
- Aishwarya Lekshmi as Amudha 'Ammu' Ravindranath
- Naveen Chandra as CI S. Ravindranath 'Ravi'
- Bobby Simha as Prabhu Das
- Parvathi T. as Kalpana, Ammu's mother
- Raja Ravindra as Dileep, Ammu's father
- Appaji Ambarisha Darbha as Ravi's father
- Pramodhini as Ravi's mother
- Satya Krishnan as Constable Satya
- Prem Sagar as Iqbal
- Anjali Ameer as Linny
- Raghu Babu as Beggar
- Kancharapalem Raju as Ismail
- Sanjay Swaroop as DIG Reddy
- Anusha Prabhu as Geetha
- Sai Badram Dinesh as Geetha's fiancé
- Guru Charan as SI Diwakar
- Jammalamadugu Davood as Mansoor Ali Khan
- T. V. Raman as Prasad

== Reception ==
A critic from The New Indian Express wrote that "Ammu is a film that can make many squirm with uneasiness, but it will definitely give a sense of hope and representation to others". A critic from The Hindustan Times said that "Ammu will definitely be one of the most important films of this year. It takes a very relevant issue that has been a topic of discussion for a long time and gives it a very interesting spin with the way it chooses to end the film". A critic from The Hindu opined that "Despite its poor third act, the writing of the first two is such that you might still find yourself searching for answers and closure. For invoking that in us, and for everything else it stands for, Ammu is a win".
