= Nawab Cafe =

2026 Indian Telugu film by Pramod Harsha

- Theatrical release poster
- Directed by: Pramod Harsha
- Written by: Pramod Harsha
- Produced by: Radha V Papudippu
- Starring: Shiva Kandukuri; Rajeev Kanakala; Teju Ashwini
- Cinematography: Kranthi Varla
- Edited by: Pavan Narava
- Music by: Prashanth R Vihari
- Production company: Harshika Productions
- Release date: 20 February 2026
- Country: India
- Language: Telugu

Nawab Cafe is a 2026 Indian Telugu-language drama film written and directed by Pramod Harsha. It stars Shiva Kandukuri, Rajeev Kanakala and Teju Ashwini.

The film was released on 20 February 2026.

== Cast ==
- Shiva Kandukuri as Raja
- Rajeev Kanakala as Ranganatham, Raja's father
- Teju Ashwini as Sakhi
- Rajkumar Kasireddy
- Chaitanya Krishna as Kumar
- Vadlamani Srinivas
- Mani Chandana as Raja's mother
- Gemini Suresh

== Music ==
The background score and songs were composed by Prashanth R Vihari.

All lyrics are written by Suresh Banisetti.

Track listing
No.	Title	Singer(s)	Length
1.	"Sakhire"	Kapil Kapilan	3:03
2.	"Chai Wala"	Kaala Bhairava	3:13

== Release and reception ==
Originally titled Chai Wala, it was later changed to Nawab Cafe due to objections from the Central Board of Film Certification. It was released on 20 February 2026.

Suhas Sistu of The Hans India gave a rating of 3/5 and called it "wholesome family entertainer". In contrast, Suresh Kavirayani of The New Indian Express rated the film 1.5 out of 5 citing the weak direction, poor screenplay and artificial performances. In contrast
