= Bhoothaddam Bhaskar Narayana =

- Theatrical release poster
- Directed by: Purushotham Raaj
- Written by: Purushotham Raaj
- Produced by: Snehal Jangala; Karthik Mudumbi; Shashidhar Kasi
- Starring: Shiva Kandukuri; Rashi Singh
- Cinematography: Goutham George
- Edited by: Garry BH
- Music by: Score: Sricharan Pakala; Songs: Sricharan Pakala; Vijai Bulganin
- Production companies: Million Dreams Creations; Vijaya Saraaga Productions
- Release date: 1 March 2024
- Country: India
- Language: Telugu

Bhoothaddam Bhaskar Narayana (transl. Magnifying glass Bhaskar Narayana) is a 2024 Indian Telugu-language mystery thriller drama film directed by Purushotham Raaj and stars Shiva Kandukuri and Rashi Singh. The film was released on 1 March 2024.

== Plot ==
Between 2000 and 2001, a series of murders occur in the Chincholi Forest region along the Andhra Pradesh–Karnataka border. The victims are women whose bodies are found decapitated after sexual assault. The killings, termed “effigy murders” by the police, gain nationwide attention but remain unsolved for 18 years.

Bhaskar, a village-based private detective, is motivated by a personal tragedy from his past. Fourteen years earlier, his brother Ravi was arrested for the murder of Rahima, a woman he loved despite belonging to a different caste. Although Ravi maintained his innocence, circumstantial evidence led to his arrest. Shortly after being released on bail, Ravi died by suicide due to social humiliation. Bhaskar, who had earlier noticed a Shiva Linga chain near Rahima's Muslim household, suspected ritual involvement, but the police dismissed his theory and closed the case.

In the present, Bhaskar assists local police with minor investigations. He is approached by a wealthy man, John Philip, to recover a lost mobile phone. Bhaskar retrieves it from a resort security guard and returns it despite discovering compromising videos on the device.

Soon after, another effigy murder occurs. Bhaskar notes unusual details, including the removal of extra fingers from the victim. The deceased is identified as Sravani, and her sister Lakshmi seeks Bhaskar's help when the investigation stalls. Bhaskar collaborates with his police friend Indrajit, but is injured when a black van deliberately hits him. Lakshmi subsequently joins the investigation.

Re-examining old case files, Bhaskar discovers that effigies resembling the victims had been carved from wood decades earlier, and that the victims’ clothing was unusually old. With assistance from Karnataka CI Shankar, Bhaskar traces hospital markings on the clothes to an Andhra Pradesh medical practitioner, Dr. Yogesh. Sravani's lover Kishore confesses that an illegal abortion performed by Yogesh resulted in her death, and that they staged it as an effigy murder. However, further evidence suggests the serial killings are unrelated to this incident.

Additional murders occur, and witness testimony reveals that the victims were transgender individuals. Bhaskar deduces that all the effigy murder victims were abandoned transgender women, explaining the absence of missing-person reports. Evidence also points to ritualistic human sacrifice connected to black magic practices. Doctors linked to earlier autopsies are found dead, including Dr. Nagaraj, in whose home an effigy is discovered.

Lakshmi recounts the myth of Bhasmasura, whose severed head is believed to retain power, connecting the murders to a ritual seeking his resurrection. Bhaskar uncovers links to forensic officer Rudraveni, who had falsified autopsy reports. Before she can be questioned, Rudraveni dies by suicide, leaving behind evidence implicating a man named Dhanav Lingeshwar.

Lingeshwar is revealed to be Basha, a mechanic involved in trafficking transgender women for ritual sacrifice. He assaults witnesses, including Indrajit, before being fatally impaled to death. Before dying, Basha reveals that his brother is conducting the final sacrifice and that Lakshmi is the intended victim.

Bhaskar follows the trail to Shukrahalli, Gulbarga, where he discovers manuscripts describing a ritual requiring 17 sacrifices to obtain the Aatma Lingam, with an 18th sacrifice involving self-immolation to resurrect Bhasmasura. The mastermind is revealed to be CI Shankar, who has secretly orchestrated the murders over 18 years under the guise of police investigations.

Bhaskar confronts Shankar at his ancestral home during the final ritual. Despite Bhaskar's attempts to stop him by destroying the ritual ashes and appealing to reason, Shankar immolates himself, believing this will resurrect Bhasmasura. Bhaskar rescues Lakshmi, ending the ritual.

Bhaskar receives official commendation for exposing the conspiracy. However, the film concludes ominously when Bhaskar receives a call from Rudra, the last surviving member of Shankar's lineage, who declares that “the real game begins now.”

== Cast ==
- Shiva Kandukuri as Detective "Bhoothaddam" Bhaskar Narayana
  - Aakash Srinivas as Young Bhaskar
- Rashi Singh as Lakshmi
- Devi Prasad as CI Danava Shankaracharyulu
- Arun Kumar as Detective "Watson" Prasad, Bhaskar Narayana's trusted assistant and best friend
- Shiva Kumar as Indrajith
- Varshini Sounderajan as Rudraveni
- Shafi as John Philip
- Sivannarayana Naripeddi as D. Gangadhara Rao, Bhaskar Narayana's father
- Kalpa Latha as Bhaskar Narayana's mother
- Rupa Lakshmi as Lakshmi and Sravani's mother
- Divija Prabhakar as Sravani, Lakshmi's elder sister and Bhaskar Narayana's close friend
- Ananth
- Prabhakar as SI Mohammad Ali
- Venkatesh Kakumanu as Kishore, Sravani's boyfriend
- Chaitanya Sagiraju
- Gaurav Dasari as Mark Joseph
- Ambati Sreenu
- Satya Srinivas
- Pranavi
- Kamal
- Gururaj Manepalli as Dr. Nataraj
- Paul Ramu as Satish

== Soundtrack ==
The songs were composed by Sricharan Pakala and Vijai Bulganin.

Track listing
No.	Title	Lyrics	Music	Singer(s)	Length
1.	"Dappukotti Cheppukona"	Bhaskarabhatla	Vijai Bulganin	Anurag Kulkarni	5:07
2.	"Kaka"	Suresh Banisetti	Vijai Bulganin	Rahul Sipligunj	4:05
3.	"Bhoothaddam Bhaskar Narayana"	Purushotham Raaj; Suresh Banisetty	Sricharan Pakala	Sricharan Pakala	3:58
4.	"Shiva Trap Trance"	Chaitanya Prasad	Sricharan Pakala	Kaala Bhairava	3:45
Total length:					16:55

== Release and reception ==
Bhoothaddam Bhaskar Narayana was released on 1 March 2024. The film premiered on Aha on 22 March 2024.

A critic from the Deccan Chronicle rated the film three out of five stars and wrote that "Overall, "Bhoothadham Bhaskar Narayana" is a commendable addition to the Telugu crime thriller genre, offering ample thrills and suspense. It's a must-watch for those craving a gripping thriller experience". A critic from The Hans India wrote that "Ultimately, the film not only successfully sustains a solid level of intrigue until the end but also attests to the director's mastery in holding suspense, making 'Bhaskar Narayan's Bhutaddham' a promising and memorable addition to the Telugu thriller landscape". A critic from The Times of India rated the film 2.5 out of 5 and wrote that "Bhoothaddam Bhaskar Narayana stands out for its innovative blend of detective storytelling with mythological elements".
