= Raj Kandukuri =

Indian film producer, director and distributor

- Born: Hyderabad, Telangana, India
- Occupations: Film director film producer, Film Distributor
- Years active: 2007 – present
- Children: Shiva Kandukuri

K. Rajasekhar, also known as Raj Kandukuri, is an Indian film producer, director and distributor who works in Telugu cinema. He owns the production house Dharmapatha Creations.

== Career ==
Raj Kandukuri ventured into films in the year 2008 with his debut film production Gautama Buddha under his banner Dharmapatha Creations and which won the Andhra Pradesh State Nandi Award for the same film that year. He debuted as a film director with the Telugu language film Gola Seenu. Kandukuri started distribution with Hrudaya Kaleyam.

== Filmography ==
Producer
year	Film	Note	ref
2008	Gautama Buddha	Bilingual film; Won Andhra Pradesh State Special Jury Awards	
2012	My Heart is Beating		
2013	Gola Seenu		
2013	Aravind 2	Co-Producer	
2015	Ladies and Gentlemen	Co-Producer	
2015	Maanja	Dubbed version	
2016	Nayaki	Bilingual film; co-Producer	
2016	Pelli Choopulu		
2017	Mental Madhilo		
2020	Choosi Choodangaane		

Director
Year	Film
2013	Gola Seenu
