= Naa Rakumarudu =

Telugu film

- Theatrical release poster
- Directed by: T Satya
- Produced by: P Vajrang
- Starring: Naveen Chandra; Ritu Varma
- Cinematography: Kumara Swamy
- Music by: Achu Rajamani
- Production company: Harivillu Creations
- Release date: 21 February 2014
- Country: India
- Language: Telugu

Naa Rakumarudu (transl. My prince) is a 2014 Indian Telugu-language romantic drama film directed by T Satya (former assistant of Puri Jagannadh) and starring Naveen Chandra and Ritu Varma.

== Cast ==
- Naveen Chandra as Vaishnav
- Ritu Varma as Bindu
- M. S. Narayana as College professor
- Sithara as Bindu's mother
- Krishna Bhagavaan as Dharmendra
- Kondavalasa as Patient
- Gundu Sudarshan as Wedding guest

== Production ==
This is the first film that Ritu Varma shot for. To prepare for his role in the film, Naveen Chandra trimmed his beard that he grew for Dalam (2013) and worked out. As of July 2014, the film's shooting has been completed.

== Soundtrack ==
The soundtrack was composed by Achu Rajamani.

Track listing
No.	Title	Lyrics	Singer(s)	Length
1.	"Thapeshwaram Khaja"	Krishna Chinni	L. V. Revanth	3:37
2.	"Hey Vinaraa"	Kedharnath	Achu Rajamani	3:25
3.	"Endhuko"	Balaji	Hemachandra, Malavika	3:06
4.	"Hey Girl"	Kedharnath	Karunya, Achu Rajamani, Deepthi Chary	4:07
5.	"Kannullo Mounam"	Balaji	Sri Krishna Sai, Srivaani	3:58
6.	"Theeram"	Krishna Chinni	Pranavi	5:23
7.	"Inka Endhukee"	Vanamali	Sri Chithra	3:54
Total length:				27:30

== Reception ==
A critic from The Times of India wrote that "There’s a bit of comedy but on the whole there’s hardly anything that you will keep looking forward to in the movie. You know how it will end. You won’t be wrong".
