= Devika & Danny =

Indian supernatural drama television series

- Promotional poster
- Genre: Supernatural drama
- Written by: Deepak Raj
- Directed by: B. Kishore
- Starring: Ritu Varma; Surya Vashistta
- Music by: Jay Krish
- Country of origin: India
- Original language: Telugu
- No. of seasons: 1
- No. of episodes: 7

Production
- Executive producer: Rohith Pisapati
- Producer: Sudhakar Chaganti
- Cinematography: Venkat C. Dillip
- Editor: Karthikeyan Rohini
- Production company: Joy Films

Original release
- Network: JioHotstar
- Release: 6 June 2025

Devika & Danny is an Indian Telugu-language supernatural drama television series written by Deepak Raj and directed by B. Kishore. The series was produced by Sudhakar Chaganti under the banner of Joy Films. It stars Ritu Varma and Surya Vashistta.

== Cast ==
- Ritu Varma as Devika
- Surya Vashistta as Danny
- Shiva Kandukuri as Subbu; who has a one side love interest on Devika.
- Subbaraju as Jagganatham "Jaggi"; Devika's fiance
- Kovai Sarala as Gayathri Amma
- Soniya Singh as Bhavani Rajeswari "Raji"; Devika's best friend
- Goparaju Ramana as Devika's uncle
- Sivannarayana Naripeddi as Devika's father
- Harsha Chemudu as John
- Shanmukh as Durga
- Abhinayashree as Durga's wife
- Mounika Reddy as Annie; Devika's friend and colleague
- Ishwarya Vullingala as Pinky, Subbu's niece

== Episodes ==
Series	Episodes	Originally released
1	7	6 June 2025

=== Season 1 (2025) ===
No.	Title	Directed by	Written by	Original release date
1	"The Priest's Prediction"	B. Kishore	Deepak Raj	6 June 2025
2	"The Family Secret"	B. Kishore	Deepak Raj	6 June 2025
3	"Danny's Pursuit"	B. Kishore	Deepak Raj	6 June 2025
4	"Devika Defies the Sacred Order"	B. Kishore	Deepak Raj	6 June 2025
5	"Journey that Redefined Her Destiny"	B. Kishore	Deepak Raj	6 June 2025
6	"The Road to Danny's Redemption"	B. Kishore	Deepak Raj	6 June 2025
7	"The Frog Jumps Out of the Bowl"	B. Kishore	Deepak Raj	6 June 2025

== Release ==
The series premiered on JioHotstar on 6 June 2025.

=== Critical reception ===
SV of Telugucinema.com rated the series 3/5 and wrote, "“Devika and Danny” is a largely light, heartwarming series. With its supernatural elements, an emotional flashback, and a relatable protagonist, it’s a satisfying, one-time watch. While the writing and characters could’ve had more depth, it still manages to impress." A critic from Sakshi Post rated the series 3/5 and wrote, "While it may not pack in high drama or intricate twists, it’s a pleasant, visually neat series that brings something different".

Avad Mohammad of OTTPlay gave the series 2.5/5 stars and wrote, "On the whole, Devika & Danny have a very interesting backdrop and story that creates interest. But it is the routine and slow narration that diverts your attention." Sangeetha Devi Dundoo of The Hindu wrote, "‘Devika & Danny’ has its moments with its simple, straightforward storytelling led by effective performances".

Critics from Eenadu, Samayam Telugu, and Sakshi gave the series positive reviews.
