= Pallapadu =

- Village
- Interactive map of Pallapadu
- Location in Andhra Pradesh, India Pallapadu (India)
- Coordinates: 16°10′N 80°24′E
- Country: India
- State: Andhra Pradesh
- District: Guntur
- Mandal: Vatticherukuru

Population
  - Total: 3,000

Languages
  - Official: Telugu
- Time zone: UTC+5:30 (IST)
- PIN: 522017

Pallapadu is a village in the Indian state of Andhra Pradesh. This village belongs to the mandal of Vatticherukuru of the Guntur district.

== Demographics and geography ==
This village had a population of 4,072 in 2011. 2,285 people work in a main job, with 684 being cultivators and 1,366 being agricultural labourers.
