= Manu Charitra =

2023 Telugu romantic drama film

- Theatrical Release poster
- Directed by: Bharath Peddagani
- Screenplay by: Bharath Peddagani
- Produced by: Narala Srinivas Reddy
- Starring: Shiva Kandukuri; Megha Akash; Pragathi Shrivastav
- Cinematography: Rahul Shrivatsav
- Edited by: Prawin Pudi
- Music by: Gopi Sundar
- Production company: Proddutur Talkies
- Release date: 23 June 2023
- Running time: 156 minutes
- Country: India
- Language: Telugu

Manu Charitra is a 2023 Indian Telugu-language romantic drama film. Written and directed by Bharath Peddagani, the film stars Shiva Kandukuri, Megha Akash, and Pragathi Shrivastav. It was produced by Narala Srinivas Reddy under Proddutur Talkies. The music was composed by Gopi Sundar.

== Plot ==
Manu is a young man who goes down the wrong path after his split with Jennifer. He joins forces with a local thug named Rudra Pratap and becomes a goon. His only goal in life is to hit people and drink like there is no end. Things change when a girl named Jaanu falls in love with him. She keeps persuading him to come out of his split, but Manu says no. The rest of the story is about how Manu comes out of the trouble he has made personally and professionally and finally finds a new chance in life.

== Cast ==
- Shiva Kandukuri as Manu Durga Raj "Manu"
- Megha Akash as Jennifer Joseph "Jenny"
- Pragathi Shrivastav as Janaki Patel "Jaanu"
- Suhas as Nandu
- Dhananjaya as Rudra Pratap
- Srikanth Iyengar as Janardhan, Mayor of Warangal
- Madhunandan as Sunil
- Garima Kaushal as Aisha
- Devi Prasad as Manu's father
- Pramodini as Manu's mother
- Sanjay Swaroop as Dean of Manu's college

Cameo Appearance

- Priya Vadlamani as Sravya in an extended cameo appearance
- Harshita Chowdary as Stella
- Raj Tarun as Ronson Joseph, Jenny's husband.
- Chandrabose as a singer in the song "Ekkada Vuntaadi Ro"
- Prakash Raj as Muthi Reddy; who is a rival of Janardhan later becomes Mayor to Warangal after his death (Appears in a Poster and narrates the end credits note).

== Soundtrack ==
The film score and soundtrack album were composed by Gopi Sundar. The music rights were acquired by Lahari Music.

== Release ==
Manu Charitra was released on 23 June 2023.

== Reception ==
Manu Charitra received mixed reviews from critics and audiences. Srivathsan Nadadhur of OTTplay gave it 2.5 out of 5 stars and wrote, "On the whole, Manu Charitra is a romantic drama that has a simple storyline. Manu Charitra moves back and forth in time, and the screenplay is decent. But the biggest drawback of Mano Charitra is that it lacks novelty. But Manu Charitra is a big project in Shiva Kandukuri's career, and he does full justice to his role. Megha Akash gets a mature role, and she impresses. Good emotions in the first half and a simple narrative without many boring scenes make this film a passable watch."

Neeshita Nyayapati of The Times of India has given it a rating of 2 out of 5 stars and wrote 'Manu Charitra feels like a film that’s stuck in time. And as much as there’s no harm in a flawed protagonist with a seemingly golden heart (despite the stalking tendencies), there must be another way of telling such a tried and tested tale.
