= Break up (disambiguation) =

A breakup is the termination of a usually intimate relationship by any means other than death.

Break Up, or Breakup may also refer to:

== Film ==
- Break Up (1965 film), also known as The Man with the Balloons, an Italian film directed by Marco Ferreri
- Ceremony of Disbanding, a 1967 Japanese yakuza film also known as The Breakup
- Break Up (1978 film), starring Tony Musante and Ornella Muti
- Break Up (1998 film), starring Bridget Fonda, Kiefer Sutherland, and Steven Weber
- The Break-Up, a 2006 American romantic comedy-drama film starring Vince Vaughn and Jennifer Aniston

== Television ==
- Break Up (TV program), a 1973 American musical comedy special
- "The Break-Up" (30 Rock), a 2006 episode
- "The Break Up" (Best of Luck Nikki), a 2012 episode
- "The Break Up" (Glee), a 2012 episode
- "The Break-Up" (Recess), a 1998 episode

== Music ==
- Break Up (album), by Pete Yorn and Scarlett Johansson
- Break Up, an EP by the Smoking Popes
- "Break Up" (song), by Mario
- "Break Up", a 1965 single by Del Shannon
- "Break Up", a 1972 song by The Nashville Teens
- Break Up, a 2022 song by girl group Citizen Queen (2022)
- "Break Up", a 2009 song by Lil Wayne
- "Break Ups", a 2012 song by Reks from Straight, No Chaser

== Other ==
- Breakup, a synonym to "mud season", the time of year when ice and snow melt
- In aviation and spaceflight, a complete destruction or fragmentation of a moving vehicle as a result of mechanical malfunction, aerodynamic stress or other

== See also ==
- Breaking Up (disambiguation)
- Breakup song (disambiguation)
- Ship breaking, the scrapping of old ships
