= Manamantha =

- Theatrical release poster
- Directed by: Chandra Sekhar Yeleti
- Screenplay by: Chandra Sekhar Yeleti; Padmavathi Malladi
- Story by: Chandra Sekhar Yeleti
- Produced by: Sai Korrapati; Rajani Subramanian
- Starring: Mohanlal; Gautami; Viswant Duddumpudi; Raina Rao
- Cinematography: Rahul Shrivatsav
- Edited by: Chandra Shekar G. V.
- Music by: Mahesh Shankar
- Production company: Varahi Chalana Chitram
- Release date: 5 August 2016
- Running time: 136 minutes
- Country: India
- Language: Telugu

Manamantha (transl. All of Us) is a 2016 Indian Telugu-language anthology film written and directed by Chandra Sekhar Yeleti and produced by Sai Korrapati. It stars Mohanlal, Gautami, Viswant Duddumpudi, and Raina Rao and also marks the former's Telugu debut after a guest appearance in the 1994 Telugu film Gandeevam. The music was composed by Mahesh Shankar with cinematography by Rahul Shrivatsav and editing by G. V. Chandra Sekhar. The film was partially reshot in Malayalam as Vismayam (transl. Amazement) with a slightly different cast.

The film was officially launched on 29 November 2015 in Hyderabad. The movie was mostly shot in Visakhapatnam, Chennai, Hyderabad, and Secunderabad. Principal photography commenced on the following day. Manamantha was premiered on 4 August 2016 in North America and was released worldwide on 5 August 2016. Its Malayalam version, titled Vismayam was released in October 2016, but the Tamil version, titled Namadhu, was released simultaneously along with Manamantha. The film is considered one of the "25 Greatest Telugu Films Of The Decade" by Film Companion.

== Plot ==
Manamantha follows the lives of four people from different paths and ambitions:

- Sai Ram is the Assistant Manager of Vijetha Supermarket in Hyderabad. He lives with his uncle Sadha Shivam Reddy alias Babai and is consistently appreciated by his manager Venkat for his innovative ideas. However, Viswanath always feels jealous of him.
- Mahitha is a girl who has Bhushan as a class teacher and Raghavendra Rao Sharma as a principal. She is a Hyderabad-based young woman who socializes with a group of friends.
- Abhiram is a computer engineering graduate. He loves his friends and falls in love with Aira, who also falls for him seeing his kind nature.
- Gayathri is a housewife from Koti who is friends with her neighbor Lakshmi. She finds it difficult to manage her life as she does not have enough money for her family. However, she is always encouraged by her old professor and has great respect for him.

One day, Sai Ram meets Dass, a local moneylender, and befriends him to teach Viswanath a lesson. Sai Ram is soon promoted as the Manager of the Supermarket for his innovative ideas, and Venkat feels happy for him. To celebrate his success, Sai Ram and Babai go on a tour to Hyderabad and drink in a bar. He soon receives a phone call from Viswanath's daughter, saying that Viswanath has been missing for two days. He then confronts Dass and learns that he had kidnapped him for more money. Sai Ram feels guilty for his actions and decides to find Viswanath.

Meanwhile, Abhiram-Aira's friendship develops, and they are always together. One of Mahitha's friends, a small boy, goes missing. Mahitha is involved in the case by the local Police Inspector, who warns Bhushan to take care of Mahitha as she is put in danger, to which Bhushan agrees. Gayathri is offered a job by her professor in Singapore but denies saying that she always wants to take care of her family. Dass blackmails Sai Ram for finding Viswanath, but later, Dass is shown to be dead, owing to his smoking habit. Sai Ram then decides to surrender himself to the Hyderabad Police.

Mahitha is consoled by an astrologer from Nanakram Guda, who knows her problems. As the days pass, Abhiram is unfortunately betrayed by Aira, who tells him that money is more important to her than him. Gayathri is accused of stealing jewels from a jewelry shop. Mahitha decides to go away as she is unable to find her friend.

Gayathri decides to accept the job offer for the sake of her family. She writes a letter before leaving and mentions that she bought a laptop for her son and a bike for her husband. In the process, Abhiram tries to commit suicide but remembers his mother, who is none other than Gayathri. Also, Mahitha's friend is saved by Sai Ram near a temple, as said by a priest. Fortunately, Vishwanath is also saved by Mahitha while searching for her friend.

In the airport, it is revealed that Gayathri is Sai Ram's wife, and Abhiram and Mahitha are their children. Gayathri decided to reject the offer and stay with them. Then, Sai Ram supported her decision by claiming Gayathri is their strength. The family clicks a selfie for their reconciliation party.

== Cast ==
- Mohanlal as Sai Ram
- Gautami as Gayathri, Sai Ram's wife
- Viswant Duddumpudi as Abhiram, Sai Ram's son
- Raina Rao as Mahitha, Sai Ram's daughter
- Anisha Ambrose as Aira, Abhiram's love interest
- Gollapudi Maruti Rao as Gayathri's professor
- Paruchuri Venkateswara Rao as Venkatachalam
- Chandra Mohan as Sadha Shivam Reddy alias Babai, Sai Ram's father
- Brahmanandam as Venky, Sai Ram's friend
- Vennela Kishore as Bhushan, Mahitha's class teacher
- Nassar as Raghavendra Rao Sharma, Mahitha's principal
- Urvashi as Lakshmi, Gayathri's neighbor
- Harsha Vardhan as Viswanath, Sai Ram's colleague
- Avantika Vandanapu as Swathi, Viswanath's daughter
- L. B. Sriram as Astrologer
- Brahmaji as Police Inspector
- Sanjay Reddy as Aira's father
- Dhanraj as Salesman
- Taraka Ratna as Roadside Painter
- Ayyappa P. Sharma as Dass (Voice dubbed by Hekar Sega), a local moneylender
- Anitha Chowdary as Viswanath's wife
- Pradeep as Lecturer
- Meghana Sritha
- Trishool Jethuri
- Kranthi
- C. V. L. Narasimha Rao
- Kalpa Latha
- Laxman Meesala
- Appaji Ambarisha Darbha as Doctor
- Ravi Siva Teja as Abhiram's friend
- Srikanth Kavuturi as Pub Visitor

Malayalam version

- P. Balachandran as Ravi Pillai alias Cheriya Ammavan, Sairam's father
- Joy Mathew as Gayathri's professor

== Production ==
=== Pre-production ===
The film was officially announced by Telugu film director Chandra Sekhar Yeleti on 14 October 2015. Produced by Sai Korrapati under his production company Varahi Chalana Chitram, the film was planned as a bilingual simultaneously made in Telugu and Malayalam languages. However, the film was shot entirely in Telugu and only a few scenes were reshot for the Malayalam version. Mohanlal and Gautami were announced in the lead roles. The filming was then said to start by the third week of November. Yeleti described the film as a "family entertainer which involves four stories". The title Manamantha was confirmed in the end of November. According to film's executive producer Krishna Rao, it is an anthology film comprising four stories which, at the end, will unite to the main plot. In Malayalam, the film is titled Vismayam, while the film has also a Tamil dubbed version titled as Namadhu. Tamil lyricist Madhan Karky wrote the lyrics for the songs in Tamil as well as the dialogues for Namadhu.

Mohanlal and Gautami are teaming after a gap of 19 years since Iruvar (1997) directed by Maniratnam. Manamantha will be Mohanlal's second Telugu film after a cameo appearance in Gandeevam (1994). She will be dubbing herself for all the languages. Mohanlal took the decision to learn Telugu language by enlisting a translator to get his diction precise, as he wanted it to be as close as possible to that of a native Telugu speaker. He plays an assistant manager in a supermarket, a down-to-earth middle class man who "has strong principles and is not willing to forgo them for small gains in life,". Mohanlal dubbed for himself for all the languages, including the Tamil dubbed version. There was also a negotiation with Bollywood actor Irrfan Khan for an important role. In October 2015, the production team also announced a casting call for a teenage girl. Viswant Duddumpudi was selected by Yeleti for one of the major roles in the film after performing a screen test for him. The casting team signed Anisha Ambrose for an important role as they were impressed with her performance in her past few films, and were particularly looking for a new face. She plays the love interest of Duddumpudi.

=== Filming ===
The film was formally launched in Hyderabad on 29 November 2015. Principal photography and regular filming began there on 30 November. Mohanlal gave dates for 25 days for filming. His portions were completed by January third week. The first schedule of filming was completed by the end of January.

Mohanlal started dubbing his part in June 2016. He posted a picture of him working in the recording studio through Twitter and Facebook.

== Music ==
Manamantha

Soundtrack album by Mahesh Shankar
- Released: 27 July 2016
- Recorded: 2016
- Genre: Feature film soundtrack
- Length: 17:03
- Languages: Telugu; Tamil; Malayalam
- Label: Vel Records
- Producer: Sai Korrapati

Mahesh Shankar chronology
Sarocharu (2012)	Manamantha (2016)	Nakshatram (2017)

The soundtrack album was composed by Mahesh Shankar. The five song album was released by Vel Records on 27 July 2016.

Telugu Soundtrack
No.	Title	Singer(s)	Length
1.	"Manamantha"	Haricharan	3:29
2.	"Butta Bomma"	Hemachandra	3:09
3.	"Aashalalo"	Damini Bhatla	2:35
4.	"Kanneerulaa"	Vidhu Prathap	3:31
5.	"Tik Tik"	Sriya Madhuri	4:19
Total length:			17:03

Tamil soundtrack
No.	Title	Lyrics	Singer(s)	Length
1.	"Namadhandro"	Madhan Karky	Haricharan	3:29
2.	"Muthumani"	Madhan Karky	Christin Jose	3:09
3.	"Aasai"	Madhan Karky	Damini Bhatla	2:35
4.	"Kanneerile"	Madhan Karky	Vidhu Prathap	3:31
5.	"Tik Tik"	Madhan Karky	Sriya Madhuri	4:19
Total length:				17:03

Malayalam Soundtrack
No.	Title	Singer(s)	Length
1.	"Naamellam"	Haricharan	3:29
2.	"Kettilamma"	Christine Jose	3:09
3.	"Aashakale"	Nayana Nair	2:35
4.	"Kanneerile"	Vidhu Prathap	3:31
5.	"Tik Tik"	Sriya Madhuri	4:19
Total length:			17:03

== Release ==
=== Theatrical ===
The film was premiered on 4 August 2016 in North America and theatrically released worldwide on the following day. It released in 81 theatres in the United States. Varaahi International Cinemas acquired the US and Canada distribution rights of Manamantha, Vismayam, and Namadhu. Vismayam and Namadhu was released only in a limited number of screens in the United States.

=== Home media ===
The film was released and is available on Hotstar.

== Reception ==
=== Box office ===
The film collected a worldwide gross of ₹7 crore (US$730,000) from all three languages in the opening day. In the United States, it collected $5,423 from the Thursday night premiere (4 August) and $27,314 in the opening day, coming second place among the Indian releases (behind Pellichoopulu). The film collected $118551 from 73 screens in the United States box office in the first weekend. In six weeks, it grossed $154,248 (₹1.04 crore) in the US.
