= Yuddham Sharanam =

- Directed by: Krishna Marimuthu
- Screenplay by: Krishna Marimuthu
- Story by: R. David Nathan
- Produced by: Sai Korrapati; Rajani Korrapati
- Starring: Naga Chaitanya; Lavanya Tripathi; Srikanth
- Cinematography: Niketh Bommireddy
- Edited by: Kripakaran
- Music by: Vivek Sagar
- Production company: Vaaraahi Chalana Chitram
- Release date: 8 September 2017
- Running time: 141 minutes
- Country: India
- Language: Telugu
- Box office: est. ₹10.8 crore

Yuddham Sharanam (transl. War is refuge) is a 2017 Indian Telugu-language action thriller film produced by Sai Korrapati on Varahi Chalana Chitram banner and directed by debutant Krishna Marimuthu. The movie stars Naga Chaitanya, Lavanya Tripathi, and Srikanth. Vivek Sagar composed the music for this movie. The movie was launched in February 2017. The film marks the 10th film from the production house. It is released theatrically on 8 September 2017.

== Plot ==
Arjun is an ambitious engineering dropout with a passion for innovation and entrepreneurship, dedicating his time to designing and building custom drones. He lives in Hyderabad with his sisters and parents, Murali Krishna and Seetha Lakshmi. His mother is a compassionate doctor committed to serving the community, while his father provides him with guidance and strong moral support. Alongside pursuing his interests and ambitions, Arjun experiences a new chapter in his personal life when he falls in love with Anjali, a medical intern.

Their serene existence is abruptly shattered by events unfolding in the city's dark underbelly. A corrupt politician, desperate to divert public and media attention from a massive Rs. 3,000 crore financial scam, orchestrates a series of coordinated serial blasts. The execution of this terror plot is handed over to Nayak, a ruthless mafia kingpin commanding a sprawling criminal syndicate. On the chaotic day of the bombings, Arjun's parents accidentally witness Nayak's men setting the plot in motion. Shortly after, they mysteriously vanish.

Arjun's frantic search ends in devastation when his parents' bodies are recovered from a river. While local law enforcement quickly dismisses the deaths as a tragic car accident, Arjun refuses to let the matter go and discovers a chilling inconsistency: the post-mortem report reveals industrial water in their stomachs. This proves they were murdered elsewhere and the accident was deliberately staged. As Arjun presses the police for a deeper investigation, his inquiries alert Nayak's network. Concurrently, a sharp and unyielding investigating officer named Jaidev "JD" Shastri is relentlessly pursuing the truth behind the blasts.

Realizing Arjun is a dangerous loose end, Nayak dispatches his assassins to wipe out the surviving family members. Forced from his comfortable life into a brutal fight for survival, Arjun successfully protects his sisters and relocates them to a secure, faraway hideout. Fully grasping that his parents were executed for being prime witnesses to the terror plot, Arjun abandons his peaceful nature and decides to take the fight to the syndicate. Rather than relying purely on brute force, he weaponizes his intellect and his proprietary drone technology to conduct aerial surveillance, outsmart the goons, and track Nayak’s movements. A tense, tactical cat-and-mouse game ensues, culminating in Arjun systematically dismantling the criminal network, exacting his revenge by killing Nayak, and ultimately returning to a peaceful life with Anjali and his family.

== Cast ==
- Naga Chaitanya as Arjun
- Lavanya Tripathi as Anjali
- Srikanth as Nayak
- Revathi as Seetha Lakshmi
- Rao Ramesh as Murali Krishna
- Murali Sharma as Jaidev "JD" Shastri
- Priyadarshi Pullikonda as Alex
- Ravi Varma as Tharun
- Rathna Shekar Reddy
- Seema Chowdary as Dhanu
- Harika Vedula as Radhika
- Vinod Kumar Alva as Politician
- Raja Ravindra as Murthy
- Kireeti Damaraju as Sekar
- Pawan as Jogi
- Shafi as Selvam
- Madhusudhan Rao as Venkat Rao
- Charandeep as DK
- John Kottoly as Ranjith
- Appaji Ambarisha Darbha as IAS Officer

== Music ==
The soundtrack for the film is composed by Vivek Sagar. The first track "Enno Enno Bhaavaley" was released on 7 August 2017, to celebrate the Indian festival of Raksha Bandhan. The full audio jukebox was released along with the trailer on 27 August 2017.

Yuddham Sharanam

Soundtrack album by Vivek Sagar
- Released: Aug 28, 2017
- Recorded: 2017
- Genre: Feature film soundtrack
- Length: 21:34
- Label: Lahari Music
- Producer: Vivek Sagar

Vivek Sagar chronology
Pelli Choopulu (2016)	Yuddham Sharanam (2017)	Sammohanam (2018)
External audio
- Official Audio Jukebox on YouTube

Track-list
No.	Title	Lyrics	Singer(s)	Length
1.	"Enno Enno Bhaavaley"	Shreshta	Pradeep Kumar	3:55
2.	"Yuddham Sharanam"	Kittu Vissapragada	Shivam, Kaala Bhairava	3:09
3.	"Yelugula Teraley"	Kittu Vissapragada	Shakthisree Gopalan	3:06
4.	"Neevalaney"	Shreshta	Karthik	4:22
5.	"Adedo Maayalley"	Kittu Vissapragada	Tracey Thorton	2:51
6.	"Padmavyuham"	Pranav Chaganty	Nikhita Gandhi, Pranav Chaganty	4:20
Total length:				21:34

== Release ==
The film was released on 8 September 2017.

== Reception ==
=== Box office ===
Yuddham Sharanam, on the opening day it collected a total gross of ₹4 Crores worldwide. On the second day movie collected a total gross of ₹2 Crores worldwide, and making its two-day collection ₹6 Crores.

=== Critical reception ===
The Times of India gave 3 out of 5 stars stating "Suffices to say that Yuddham Sharanam and Marimuthu impress with the emotional part but falter with the action drama. All said and done, this one might go down as Naga Chaitanya’s best action-film to date".Firstpost gave 2.75 out of 5 stars stating "At a runtime of 140 minutes, Yuddham Sharanam tries to weave a convincing tale of revenge and love. There’s a lot to like about it, but then, at the same time, the film doesn’t let you immerse yourself in its world. And this distance just keeps growing as we flip through its pages".
