= Choosi Choodangaane =

- Directed by: Sesha Sindhu Rao
- Written by: Story and Screenplay: Sesha Sindhu Rao; Dialogues: Padmavathi Malladi
- Produced by: Raj Kandukuri
- Starring: Shiva Kandukuri; Varsha Bollamma; Malavika Satheesan
- Cinematography: Vedaraman Sankaran
- Edited by: Ravi Teja Girijala
- Music by: Gopi Sundar
- Production company: Dharmapatha Creations
- Distributed by: Suresh Productions
- Release date: 31 January 2020
- Country: India
- Language: Telugu

Choosi Choodangaane (transl. The moment I saw you) is a 2020 Indian Telugu-language romantic comedy film written and directed by Sesha Sindhu Rao and produced by Raj Kandukuri under the banner Dharmapatha Creations. The film is introducing Shiva Kandukuri, Varsha Bollamma and Malavika Satheesan in the lead roles. The film's music is composed by Gopi Sundar, while cinematography and editing are handled by Vedaraman and Raviteja Girijala respectively. The film released on 31 January 2020 and is being distributed by Suresh Productions. The film's title is based on a song from Chalo (2018).

== Plot ==
It is the story of Siddu (Shiva Kandukuri), through different stages of life. His relationship with his parents (Anish Kuruvilla and Pavithra Lokesh), his struggles in his career, friendship and how he falls in love with Aishwarya (Malavika Satheesan) in college and what happens when he meets Shruti (Varsha Bollamma) at a later part in his life is depicted through this film.

Siddu’s academic life is controlled by his mother from childhood and he ends up joining an engineering college against his wishes. There he falls in love with another fresher Aishwarya and she reciprocates. Aishwarya being close with other male students irks Sidhu and towards the end of the college they drift apart. Finally Aishwarya breaks up with him saying her father would not agree to their marriage. A depressed Sidhu gets angry during an exam and quits engineering after tearing apart the papers in the exam.

Sidhu becomes a wedding photographer, although he aspires to become fashion photographer one day. In one of the weddings, he sees Shruti. He meets her again in a pub and he is introduced to her by his friend Yogi back from college. Shruti is passionate about music and is a drummer in a band. She is on trials to become a music director for films. Sidhu admires her carefree attitude and after having some magical moments, he develops feelings for her. On his way to confess his feelings to her, he is shocked to see Aishwarya and Shruti hugging each other at the café. They say sorry to each other before leaving. Upon questioning Yogi, he gets to know that Shruti is also from the same college and was friends with Aishwarya.

On a flashback, on the first day of their college, Shruti sees Sidhu and instantly likes him. She expresses that to Aishwarya who ridicules it. Shruti at the coffee shop poses as senior and makes Yogi pay for it and later they become good friends. Yogi is also a close friend to Sidhu and he tells Sidhu that he has got a fan from the CS department and points to Shruti. Sidhu mistakes it for Aishwarya who is sitting beside Shruti as they already spoke to each other before. After few days, Shruti is heart broken when she sees Aishwarya and Sidhu together. She fights with Aishwarya and accuses her of cheating and breaks contact with her. On a college event, Shruti finds Aishwarya hugging some other guy in a dark room and asks her to not hurt Sidhu. It is later revealed that is why Aishwarya leaves Sidhu which saved him or else Shruti would expose her. Shruti leaves to Texas for MS along with Yogi.

Back to the current time, when Sidhu is already frustrated that Shruti hid from him about being friends with Aishwarya gets another shock when her boyfriend Virat returns from the US. Since Shruti never mentioned him before, he thinks it’s not really a relationship. Later goes to confess his feelings for Shruti but before he could do that Shruti accepts Virat’s marriage proposal. That night Sidhu gets drunk and leaves the party.

Sidhu gets an opportunity as fashion photographer which was his long time dream. But being frustrated he fails to make a mark. Gets into an argument with a model and leaves. He goes to Shruti’s house and blames her for ruining his career. Later Shruti goes to his room to apologise for hiding the truths, but she finds him partially naked with another woman whom Sidhu met at a pub and goes on a one night stand. She goes to Yogi’s room to vent out the frustration and admits she liked Sidhu although there is nothing to do now.

Sidhu gets back to wedding photography and loses interest in fashion photography. He then receives an invite to Shruti’s wedding. Recollecting all the moments he had with Shruti, he runs to the wedding to express his feelings any how and realises Shruti is not the bride. He finds her at the wedding and after apologising they reconcile. Shruti then tells him that she has been in love with him for 8 years from the moment she saw him. Sidhu is surprised on how the wedding broke as he saw Virat’s family in her house before to do the wedding talks. It is shown that Shruti’s dad refuses the alliance and breaks the marriage talk with Virat’s family as he knew that she loves Sidhu and saves her from the embarrassment of having to deal with the situation.

== Cast ==
- Shiva Kandukuri as Siddu
- Varsha Bollamma as Shruti
- Malavika Satheesan as Aishwarya
- Pavitra Lokesh as Siddu's mother
- Anish Kuruvilla as Siddu's father
- Gururaj Manepalli
- Venkatesh Kakumanu
- Rajesh Khanna

== Production ==
The film went on to the floors in January 2019 and completed shooting by April 2019.

== Soundtrack ==
Choosi Choodangaane

Soundtrack album by Gopi Sundar
- Released: 2020
- Genre: Feature film soundtrack
- Length: 19:17
- Label: Madhura Audio
- Producer: Gopi Sundar

Gopi Sundar chronology
Entha Manchivaadavuraa (2020)	Choosi Choodangaane (2020)	World Famous Lover (2020)
External audio
- Official Audio Jukebox on YouTube

The music is composed by Gopi Sundar, and released on Madhura Audio label.

Track list
No.	Title	Lyrics	Singer(s)	Length
1.	"Nee Parichayamutho"	Ananta Sriram	Sid Sriram	3:36
2.	"Venakane Unna"	Ananth Sriram	Chinmayi	4:49
3.	"Nede Naaku Nenu"	Ramajogayya Sastry	Gopi Sundar	3:36
4.	"Thoorupu Jaadalo"	Viswa	L. V. Revanth	3:12
5.	"Yemaindho Thelusa"	Sirivennela Seetharama Sastry	Kaala Bhairava, Nutana Mohan	4:04
Total length:				19:17

== Release and reception ==
Choosi Choodangaane was released on 31 January 2020.

Y. Sunita Chowdhary of The Hindu wrote "We admire Varsha Bollamma, the cinematography is very good. The director attempts to blend together various elements but none stands out. The film looks crisp, but is a painful experience nevertheless".
