= Arjun Reddy (soundtrack) =

Soundtrack album by Radhan
- Released: 21 August 2017
- Recorded: 2017
- Genre: Feature film soundtrack
- Length: 28:05
- Language: Telugu
- Label: Aditya Music
- Producer: Radhan

Radhan chronology
Radha (2017)	Arjun Reddy (2017)	Manasuku Nachindi (2018)

Singles from Arjun Reddy
- 1. "Mangaluru – Mussorie (Dhooram)" Released: 23 April 2017; 2. "The Breakup Song (Teliseney Na Nuvvey)" Released: 19 June 2017; 3. "Emitemito" Released: 10 July 2017; 4. "Madhurame" Released: 31 July 2017

Arjun Reddy is the soundtrack to the 2017 film of the same name directed by Sandeep Reddy Vanga. The album featured seven songs composed by Radhan with lyrics penned by Ananta Sriram, Rambabu Gosala, Shreshta and Mandela Pedaswamy. The album was released on 21 August 2017 through Aditya Music and preceded with four singles. Although most of the song were composed by Radhan, Shrestha who penned lyrics for "Madhurame" and "Gundelona"; composed the latter's tune that lacked instrumental support.

== Release ==
Arjun Reddy's music was preceded with four singles; the first one from the soundtrack titled "Mangaluru – Mussorie" (later known as "Dhooram") was released on 23 April 2017. The second single "The Breakup Song" (later known as "Teliseney Na Nuvvey") released on 19 June 2017, while the other two—"Emitemito" and "Madhurame"—were released on 10 and 31 July 2017, respectively. The film's soundtrack was released at a pre-release promotional event in Hyderabad on 21 August 2017. Aditya Music also released the audio CDs of the soundtrack.

== Reception ==
Sangeetha Devi Dundoo of The Hindu wrote that Radhan's music, which varies from "classical strains to more trippy beats", was one of the factors, along with the cinematography, that brought Arjun Reddy to life. Srinivasan Nadathur, writing for the same publication summarised that "The Breakup Song" along with "Break-Up" from Rarandoi Veduka Chudham (2017) and "Badulu Cheppave" from Ninnu Kori (2017) is an instance in which Telugu cinema "continued in Kolaveri mode too intermittently" in the first half of 2017. In December 2017, Nadadhur commented; "For a film so brutally raw and honest, Arjun Reddy got its aura from its music as much as the swag of Vijay Deverakonda". He added that the heavy metal undertone matched up to the "extremities and mood swings of its lead character". Nadadhur also praised the use of semi-classical and jazzy touches in the soundtrack.

Neeshita Nyayapati writing for The Times of India said the songs "deserve a special mention" and that Radhan did a "brilliant job". Namrata Suri of The News Minute wrote that Arjun Reddy has one of the "most original soundtracks composed by Radhan", and that "Madhurame" and "The Breakup song" are the memorable songs from the film. Baradwaj Rangan of Film Companion South called it as a "rousing" album, while Indo-Asian News Service (published via Hindustan Times) called it as "terrific". Hemanth Kumar of Firstpost wrote "Radhan does a terrific job with his background score". Suresh Kavirayani of Deccan Chronicle complimented Radhan's music as "an asset to the film".

== Track listing ==
No.	Title	Lyrics	Singer(s)	Length
1.	"Dhooram"	Ananta Sriram	Nikhita Gandhi	3:01
2.	"Teliseney Na Nuvvey"	Rambabu Gosala	L. V. Revanth	4:09
3.	"Emitemito"	Ananta Sriram	Alphons Joseph	3:21
4.	"Madhuram"	Shreshta	Sameera Bharadwaj	5:40
5.	"Mari Mari"	Mandela Pedaswamy	Gowthami	2:54
6.	"Oopiri Aaguthunnadey"	Rambabu Gosala	L. V. Revanth	4:05
7.	"Gundelona"	Shreshta	Sowjanya	3:55
Total length:				28:05

== Accolades ==
Ceremony	Category	Nominee	Result	Ref.
65th Filmfare Awards South	Best Lyricist – Telugu	Shreshta (for "Madhurame")	Nominated	
65th Filmfare Awards South	Best Male Playback Singer – Telugu	L. V. Revanth (for "Teliseney Na Nuvvey")	Nominated	
65th Filmfare Awards South	Best Female Playback Singer – Telugu	Sameera Bharadwaj (for "Madhurame")	Nominated	
16th Santosham Film Awards	Best Male Playback Singer	L. V. Revanth (for "Teliseney Na Nuvvey")	Won	
