= Breaking Up =

Breaking up may refer to a breakup, as in a relationship breakup.

Breaking Up may also refer to:

== Books ==
- Breaking Up, book by Nigel Williams, based on the play of the same name
- Breaking Up (graphic novel), a young-adult fiction graphic novel

== Film and TV ==
- Breaking Up (1978 film), an American TV film
- Breaking Up (1985 film), a 1985 television film
- Breaking Up (1997 film), a 1997 direct-to-video film
- Breaking Up (TV series), 1986 British comedy-drama tv series starring Eileen Atkins and Dave King
- Breaking Up with Shannen Doherty, a 2006 reality TV series

== Theatre ==
- Breaking Up, play by Nigel Williams.

== Music ==
- Breakin' Up, a song by Rilo Kiley from Under the Blacklight
- "Breaking Up" (song), a 2007 single by Eskimo Joe
- "Breakin' Up", a song by Gwen Stefani from The Sweet Escape
- "Breakin' Up", a song by Violent Femmes from New Times
- "Breaking Up", a song by Charli XCX from Sucker

== See also ==
- Break Up (disambiguation)
