= Arddhanaari =

- Theatrical release poster
- Directed by: Bhanushanker Chowdary
- Written by: Bhanushanker Chowdary
- Produced by: M. Ravi Kumar
- Starring: Arjun Yajath; Mouryaani
- Cinematography: Sai Srinivas Gadhiraju
- Edited by: Kotagiri Venkateswara Rao
- Music by: Ravi Varma
- Production company: Patthikonda Cinemass
- Release date: 1 July 2016
- Running time: 139 minutes
- Country: India
- Language: Telugu

Arddhanaari (transl. Half-Woman) is a 2016 Indian Telugu-language vigilante action drama film written and directed by Bhanushanker Chowdary. The film stars newcomers Arjun Yajath as a transgender woman and Mouryaani. The film was dubbed into Hindi under the same name by Wide Angle Media Pvt. Ltd.

== Summary ==
Arddhanaari revolves around the protagonist who takes the disguise as Hijra and leads the fight against social injustice and turns punisher as well.

== Cast ==
- Arjun Yajath (Arjun Ambati)
- Mouryaani
- Mirchi Madhavi
- Gharshan Sreenivasan
- Harikrisna

== Reception ==
Arddhanaari was released in 300 screens to mixed reviews. Indiaglitz rated the film with 2.5/5 stars stating that the film may be enjoyed by C-class audience for its outmoded narration style, while iluvcinema gave 3 stars mentioning it as an interesting, realistic revenge story of a transgender.

== Awards and nominations ==
| Year | Award | Category | Nominee | Result | Ref. |
|---|---|---|---|---|---|
| 2016 | Nandi Awards | Best Makeup Artist | Ranjith | Won | |
| 2016 | Nandi Awards | Best Male Dubbing Artist | Vaasu | Won | |
