= Shiva Kandukuri =

Male actor in Telugu cinema

- Born: 18 February 1995 (age 31); Hyderabad, Andhra Pradesh (now in Telangana), India
- Education: Pennsylvania State University
- Occupations: Actor, Energy Engineer
- Father: Raj Kandukuri

Shiva Kandukuri is an Indian actor who primarily works in Telugu cinema. He is primarily known for his work in Choosi Choodangaane (2020).

== Early life ==
Shiva Kandukuri hails from Hyderabad, India. His father Raj Kandukuri is a film producer. Shiva graduated in Renewable Energy Engineering and Extended Economics from Pennsylvania State University and worked in Philadelphia, United States, after which he started his acting career.

== Career ==
Shiva Kandukuri made his debut with Choosi Choodangaane in 2020. After his debut, he starred in Gamanam, an anthology film.

In 2022, he acted in the anthology series Meet Cute. He collaborated with director Bharath Peddagani on Manu Charitra (2023).

== Filmography ==
Key
†	Denotes films that have not yet been released

Year	Title	Role	Notes	Ref
2020	Choosi Choodangaane	Siddhu		
2021	Gamanam	Ali		
2023	Manu Charitra	Manu		
2024	Bhoothaddam Bhaskar Narayana	Bhoothaddam Bhaskar Narayana		
2024	Manamey	Karthik		
2025	Anaganaga	Adult Ram	Cameo appearance	
2026	Nawab Cafe	Raja		

=== Television ===
Year	Title	Role	Network	Notes
2022	Meet Cute	Dr. Aman	SonyLIV	under segment "Star Struck"
2025	Devika & Danny	Subbu	JioHotstar	

== Awards and nominations ==
Year	Award	Category	Work	Result	Ref
2021	South Indian International Movie Awards	Best Male Debut – Telugu	Choosi Choodangaane	Won	
