= Shreshta =

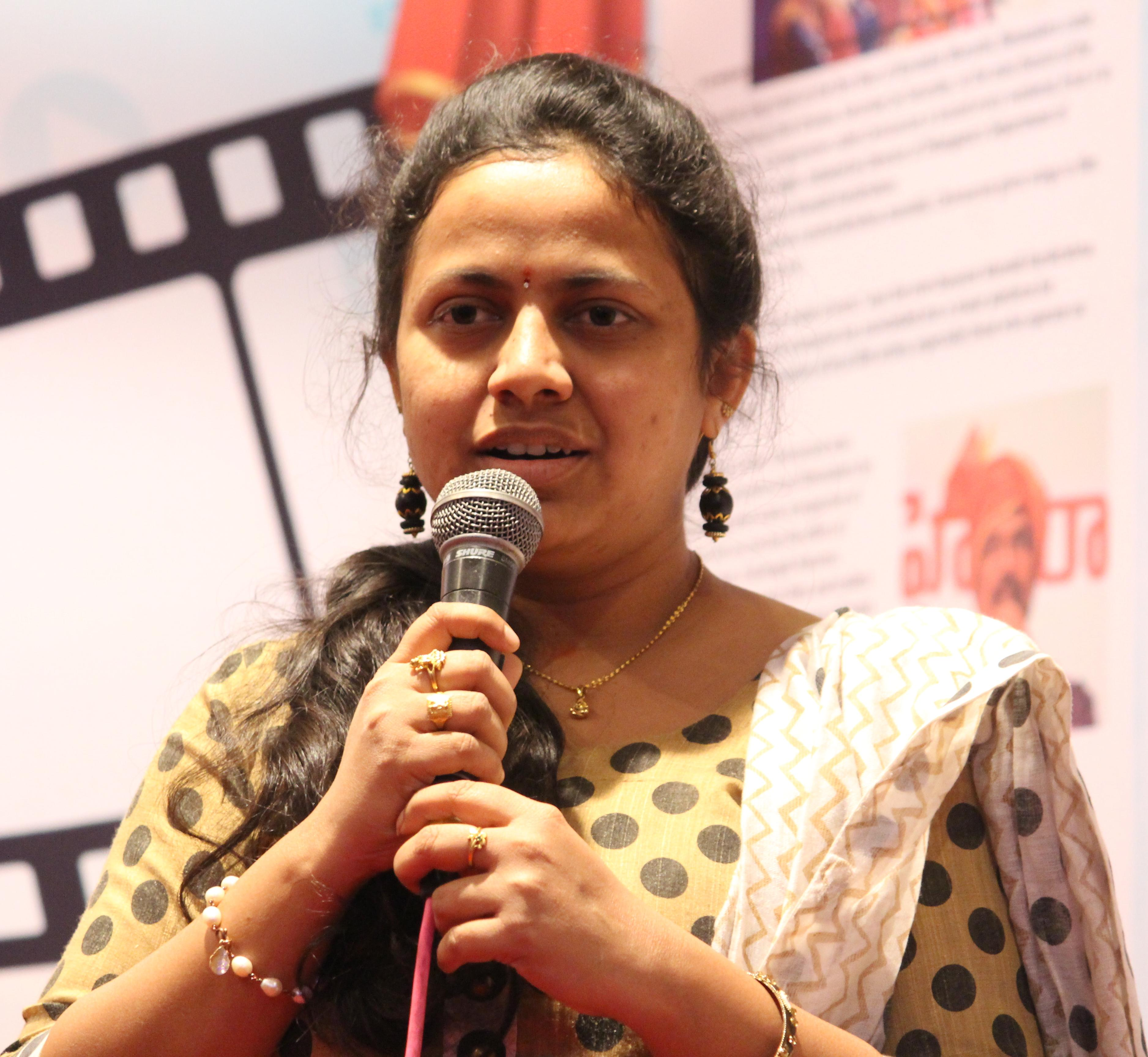
- Born: Mancherial, Adilabad, Telangana, India
- Occupations: Poet, lyricist, songwriter

Shreshta is a Telugu-Language lyricist and writer. She became popular for her lyrics for the songs in the movies, Pelli Choopulu and Arjun Reddy. After her debut, she was lauded as Telugu cinema’s first female lyricist.

== Early life ==
She was born in Mancherial in Adilabad district, Telangana. She is the only child, her father is a businessman and mother a government employee. Her mother a Hindu Brahmin and raised in a devout Hindu family and devotional songs were part of family culture. She was interested in writing from early age. She did her schooling in Mancherial and did her Bachelors in Commerce and LLB at Osmania University. She used to write poems and was encouraged by her grandfather, Panchadhara Venkata Kishan. She first started writing poems when she was in tenth standard.

== Career ==
She was encouraged by popular Telugu language lyricist, Vennelakanti to take up a career in penning lyrics. Initially, she started writing devotional songs, before pushing a career in movies.

=== Tollywood ===
She made Tollywood debut in 2013 with the film, Oka Romantic Crime Katha. She also penned lyrics for the Telugu films, Ko Ante Koti and Courier Boy Kalyan. Pelli Choopulu was her 9th movie as a lyricist.

== Filmography ==
Year	Movie	Music	Song(s)
2012	Oka Romantic Crime Katha	Praveen Immadi	All songs
2012	Ko Ante Koti	ShaktiKanth Karthick	"O Madhurame", "Bangaru Konda"
2013	Jabardasth (film)	S. Thaman	"Arere Arere"
2015	Courier Boy Kalyan	Karthik-Anup Rubens	"Maya O Maya"
2016	Pelli Choopulu	Vivek Sagar	"Chinuku Taake", "Merise Merise"
2017	Arjun Reddy	Radhan (Madhurame), Shreshta (Gundelona)	"Madhurame", "Gundelona"
2017	Yuddham Sharanam	Vivek Sagar	"Neevalaney", "Enno Enno Bhaavaley"
2017	Hello	Anup Rubens	"Hello","Merise Merise"
2018	Aatagallu	Sai Karthik	"Neevalle Neevalle"
2019	Nuvvu Thopu Raa	PA Deepak	"Pada Padamani"
2019	Dorasaani	Prashanth R Vihari	"kallallo"
2024	Alanaati Ramchandrudu	Sashank Tirupathi	"Kanulara"

== Awards ==
- Debutant Award at Cine Maa Mahila Awards in 2013
