= List of accolades received by Mahanati =

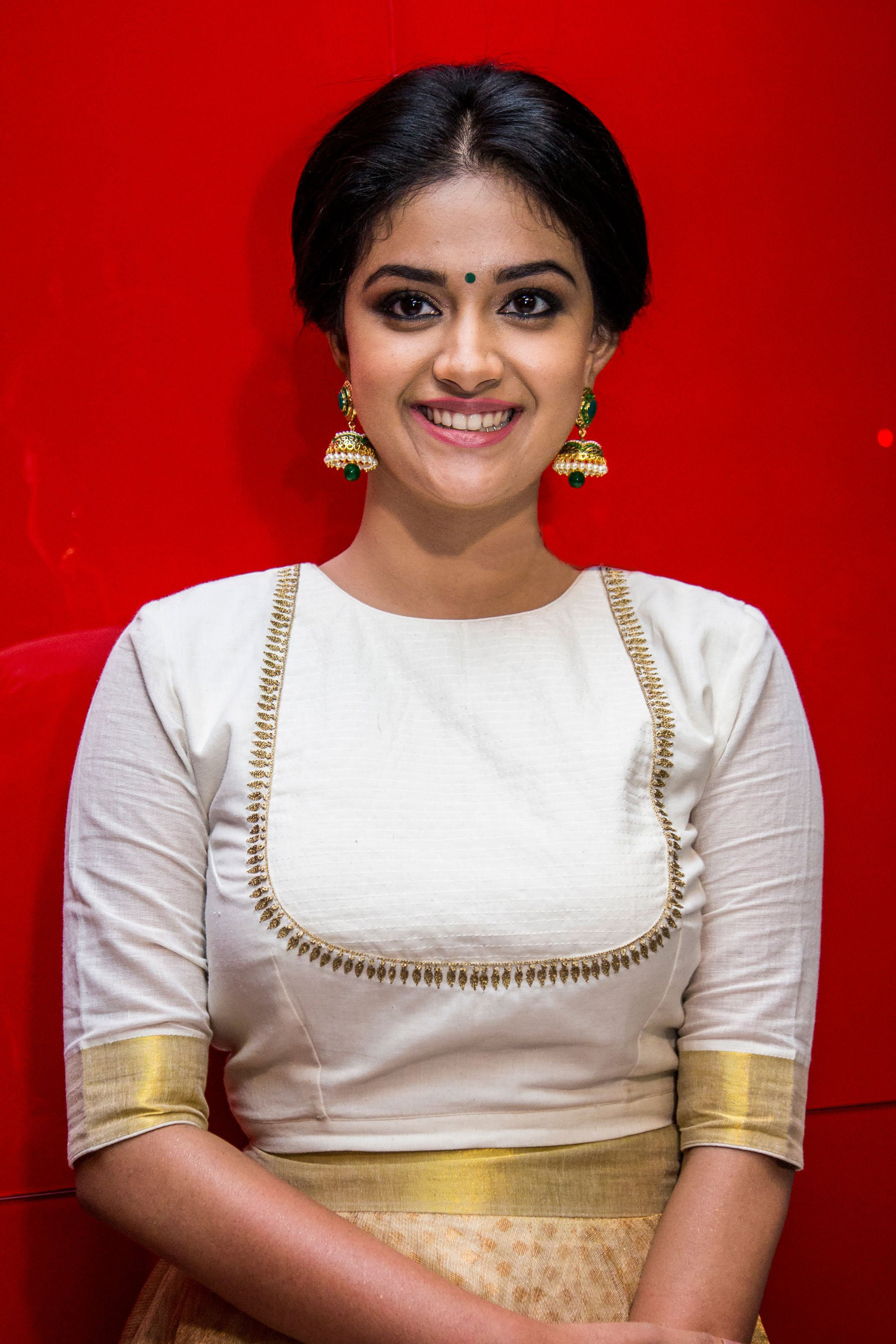
- Keerthy Suresh won several awards for her role as Savitri.
Accolades
| Award | Won | Nominated |
| Edison Awards | 2 | 2 |
| Filmfare Awards South | 4 | 9 |
| Indian Film Festival of Melbourne | 1 | 4 |
| National Film Awards | 3 | 3 |
| Norway Film Festival Awards | 1 | 2 |
| Radio City Cine Awards | 1 | 9 |
| Santosham Film Awards | 2 | 2 |
| South Indian International Movie Awards | 3 | 10 |
| TSR -TV9 National Film Awards | 6 | 6 |
| Zee Cine Awards Telugu | 10 | 10 |
| Other Awards | 1 | 1 |
- Total number of awards and nominations (Note: Awards in certain categories do not have prior nominations and only winners are announced by the jury. For simplification and to avoid errors, each award in this list has been presumed to have had a prior nomination.)
| Totals | 33 | 59 |
- References

Mahanati is a 2018 Indian Telugu-language biographical drama film written and directed by Nag Ashwin and produced by C. Ashwini Dutt, Swapna Dutt, and Priyanka Dutt under the banners Vyjayanthi Movies and Swapna Cinema. The film is based on the life of Indian actress Savitri, played by Keerthy Suresh while Dulquer Salmaan, in his Tollywood debut, plays the role of Gemini Ganesan. Samantha, Vijay Deverakonda, Shalini Pandey, Rajendra Prasad, Prakash Raj and Bhanupriya appear in supporting roles, while Naga Chaitanya and Mohan Babu, play guest appearances in the film. It follows Savitri's life, depicting her turbulent rise to prominence, marriage with Ganesan, and subsequent fall from grace, which is viewed from the perspective of a journalist and a photographer, played by Samantha and Deverakonda, respectively.

Made on a budget of ₹25 crore (₹250 million), Mahanati was released on 9 May 2018 and grossed over ₹850 million. The film was included in The Hindu's top 20 Tollywood films of the decade. The film garnered awards and nominations in several categories, with particular praise for its direction, screenplay, Keerthy's performance, music, cinematography, and editing.

At the 66th National Film Awards, Mahanati won three awards – Best Feature Film in Telugu, Best Actress, Best Costume Design. The film was nominated in nine categories at 66th Filmfare Awards South in which it won in four categories. It was nominated in ten categories each at 8th South Indian International Movie Awards and 2nd Zee Cine Awards Telugu.

== Accolades ==
| Award | Date of ceremony (Note: Date is linked to the article about the awards held that year, wherever possible.) | Category | Recipient(s) | Result | Ref. |
|---|---|---|---|---|---|
| Edison Awards | 17 February 2019 | Best Film | Vyjayanthi Movies | Nominated | |
| Edison Awards | 17 February 2019 | Best Actress | Keerthy Suresh | Nominated | |
| Filmfare Awards South | 21 December 2019 | Best Film – Telugu | Mahanati | Won | |
| Filmfare Awards South | 21 December 2019 | Best Director – Telugu | Nag Ashwin | Won | |
| Filmfare Awards South | 21 December 2019 | Best Actress – Telugu | Keerthy Suresh | Won | |
| Filmfare Awards South | 21 December 2019 | Best Actor – Telugu | Dulquer Salmaan | Nominated | |
| Filmfare Awards South | 21 December 2019 | Best Actor Critics – Telugu | Dulquer Salmaan | Won | |
| Filmfare Awards South | 21 December 2019 | Best Supporting Actress – Telugu | Samantha | Nominated | |
| Filmfare Awards South | 21 December 2019 | Best Music Director – Telugu | Mickey J. Meyer | Nominated | |
| Filmfare Awards South | 21 December 2019 | Best Lyricist – Telugu | Sirivennela Seetharama Sastry | Nominated | |
| Filmfare Awards South | 21 December 2019 | Best Female Playback Singer – Telugu | Ramya Behara | Nominated | |
| Indian Film Festival of Melbourne | 12 August 2018 | Equality In Cinema (Honorary Award) | Mahanati | Won | |
| Indian Film Festival of Melbourne | 12 August 2018 | Best Film | Mahanati | Nominated | |
| Indian Film Festival of Melbourne | 12 August 2018 | Best Actress | Keerthy Suresh | Nominated | |
| Indian Film Festival of Melbourne | 12 August 2018 | Best Supporting Performance | Samantha | Nominated | |
| National Film Awards | 9 August 2019 | Best Feature Film in Telugu | Mahanati | Won | |
| National Film Awards | 9 August 2019 | Best Actress | Keerthy Suresh | Won | |
| National Film Awards | 9 August 2019 | Best Costume Design | Indrakshi Pattanaik, Gaurang Shah, Archana Rao | Won | |
| Norway Tamil Film Festival Awards | 25–28 April 2019 | Best Actress | Keerthy Suresh | Nominated | |
| Norway Tamil Film Festival Awards | 25–28 April 2019 | Special Jury Award | Keerthy Suresh | Won | |
| Radio City Cine Awards S2 | 1 March 2019 | Best Heroine | Keerthy Suresh | Won | |
| Radio City Cine Awards S2 | 1 March 2019 | Best Film | Mahanati | Nominated | |
| Radio City Cine Awards S2 | 1 March 2019 | Best Director | Nag Ashwin | Nominated | |
| Radio City Cine Awards S2 | 1 March 2019 | Best Story | Mahanati | Nominated | |
| Radio City Cine Awards S2 | 1 March 2019 | Best Dialogue | Mahanati | Nominated | |
| Radio City Cine Awards S2 | 1 March 2019 | Best Supporting Actress | Samantha | Nominated | |
| Radio City Cine Awards S2 | 1 March 2019 | Best Female Singer | Charulatha Mani for "Sada Nannu" | Nominated | |
| Radio City Cine Awards S2 | 1 March 2019 | Best Supporting Actor | Rajendra Prasad | Nominated | |
| Radio City Cine Awards S2 | 1 March 2019 | Best Music Director | Mickey J. Meyer | Nominated | |
| Santosham Film Awards | 29 September 2019 | Best Supporting Actor | Rajendra Prasad | Won | |
| Santosham Film Awards | 29 September 2019 | Best Young Performer (Child Actor) | Baby Sai Tejaswni | Won | |
| South Indian International Movie Awards | 15 August 2019 | Best Film (Telugu) | Vyjayanthi Movies | Won | |
| South Indian International Movie Awards | 15 August 2019 | Best Director (Telugu) | Nag Ashwin | Nominated | |
| South Indian International Movie Awards | 15 August 2019 | Best Actor (Telugu) | Dulquer Salmaan | Nominated | |
| South Indian International Movie Awards | 15 August 2019 | Best Actress (Telugu) | Keerthy Suresh | Won | |
| South Indian International Movie Awards | 15 August 2019 | Best Supporting Actor (Telugu) | Rajendra Prasad | Won | |
| South Indian International Movie Awards | 15 August 2019 | Best Music Director (Telugu) | Mickey J. Meyer | Nominated | |
| South Indian International Movie Awards | 15 August 2019 | Best Female Playback Singer – Telugu | Sunitha Upadrashta | Nominated | |
| South Indian International Movie Awards | 15 August 2019 | Best Lyricist (Telugu) | Sirivennela Seetharama Sastry | Nominated | |
| South Indian International Movie Awards | 15 August 2019 | Best Cinematographer (Telugu) | Dani Sanclez-Lopez | Nominated | |
| TSR -TV9 National Film Awards | 17 February 2019 | Best Actress | Keerthy Suresh | Won | |
| TSR -TV9 National Film Awards | 17 February 2019 | Best Character Actor | Rajendra Prasad | Won | |
| TSR -TV9 National Film Awards | 17 February 2019 | Best Film | Vyjayanthi Movies | Won | |
| TSR -TV9 National Film Awards | 17 February 2019 | Best Child Artiste | Baby Sai Tejaswini | Won | |
| TSR -TV9 National Film Awards | 17 February 2019 | Best Director | Nag Ashwin | Won | |
| TSR -TV9 National Film Awards | 17 February 2019 | Best Male Singer | Anurag Kulkarni for "Mahanati" song | Won | |
| Zee Cine Awards Telugu | 6 January 2019 | Best Film | Vyjayanthi Movies | Won | |
| Zee Cine Awards Telugu | 6 January 2019 | Best Director | Nag Ashwin | Won | |
| Zee Cine Awards Telugu | 6 January 2019 | Best Actress | Keerthy Suresh | Won | |
| Zee Cine Awards Telugu | 6 January 2019 | Best Supporting Actor | Rajendra Prasad | Won | |
| Zee Cine Awards Telugu | 6 January 2019 | Best Playback Singer - Male | Anurag Kulkarni for "Mahanati" song | Won | |
| Zee Cine Awards Telugu | 6 January 2019 | Best Child Artist | Baby Sai Tejaswini | Won | |
| Zee Cine Awards Telugu | 6 January 2019 | Best Makeup | Moovendran | Won | |
| Zee Cine Awards Telugu | 6 January 2019 | Best Costume Designer | Gourang Shah | Won | |
| Zee Cine Awards Telugu | 6 January 2019 | Best Stylist | Indrakshi Pattanaik | Won | |
| Zee Cine Awards Telugu | 6 January 2019 | Best Crew | Mahanati Team - Swapna Dutt & Priyanka Dutt | Won | |

== Film charts ==
- 4th – IMDb
- 6th – iQlickMovies
- 7th – Karthik Keramalu, HuffPost
- 10 Best Films of 2018 – Sangeetha Devi Dundoo, The Hindu
- Top 10 Telugu Movies 2018 – Sakshi Post
- 25 Greatest Telugu Films Of The Decade – Sankeertana Varma, Film Companion

== See also ==
- List of Tollywood films of 2018
- Mahanati (soundtrack)
