= Pelli Choopulu =

2016 Indian film by Tharun Bhascker

- Theatrical release poster
- Directed by: Tharun Bhascker
- Written by: Tharun Bhascker
- Produced by: Raj Kandukuri; Yash Rangineni
- Starring: Vijay Deverakonda; Ritu Varma
- Cinematography: Nagesh Banell
- Edited by: Ravi Teja Girijala
- Music by: Vivek Sagar
- Production companies: BigBen Cinemas; Dharmapatha Creations
- Distributed by: Suresh Productions; Freeze Frame Films (Overseas)
- Release date: 29 July 2016
- Running time: 118 minutes
- Country: India
- Language: Telugu
- Budget: ₹60 lakh–₹1.2 crore
- Box office: est. ₹30 crore

Pelli Choopulu (transl. Matchmaking) is a 2016 Indian Telugu-language romantic comedy film written and directed by Tharun Bhascker (in his directorial debut) and produced by Raj Kandukuri and Yash Rangineni. It features Vijay Deverakonda and Ritu Varma in the lead roles. Partly based on a real-life incident of "Spitfire BBQ" food truck, the film revolves around a boy and a girl who meet during match-making. How their aspirations bring them together forms the rest of the story.

The film was released worldwide on 29 July 2016 to positive reviews from critics and became a commercial blockbuster. The film provided breakthrough for the film's cast and crew. It is considered one of the "25 Greatest Telugu Films Of The Decade" by Film Companion.

The film won two National Film Awards–Best Telugu Film and Best Screenplay, two Andhra Pradesh State Nandi Awards–Best Feature Film and Best Actress, Telangana State Gaddar Film Awards for Second Best Feature Film, and two Filmfare Awards South including Best Telugu Film. The film was remade in Hindi as Mitron (2018), in Malayalam as Vijay Superum Pournamiyum (2019) and in Tamil as Oh Manapenne! (2021).

== Plot ==
Prasanth goes to Chitra's house for a matchmaking event. He is a guy who completes his B.Tech by clearing many subjects for almost 5 years, but he is also lazy and incapable of doing any work. His dream is to become a chef and open a restaurant, but he does not get any support from his father. Chitra is a very focused girl who works hard to fulfil her dreams of going to Australia. However, her father shows no interest, as she is a girl. When both of them meet at the matchmaking event her younger cousin, Subhash, accidentally locks the door which jams very often and they get stuck eventually. To pass time, they talk about their past.

Chitra reveals that she was in love with a North Indian guy named Vikram. They both wanted to start a food truck business. Vikram went to Delhi to talk with his father about their love and business. Meanwhile, Chitra started her plan eagerly, and was ready to surprise Vikram by buying the truck. Then things went wrong and Vikram did not come back, overpowered by greed of getting dowry. Chitra and her father waited for him but when they realised Vikram wasn't coming back, her father decided to get her married to someone else.

On his turn, Prasanth reveals that he was unemployed and always went out with his two friends. He, along with his friends, made cooking videos, as he is passionate about cooking. But it wasn't profitable enough, so they planned to make prank videos and were caught red-handed by Prashant's father, which ended their plan. He then got a job in a call centre after he was recommended by his father. He started going out with a girl to show off to his friends, but she cheated on him. He found out about it only when her second boyfriend called him at work, and quit his job after having a fight with his boss.

It is then revealed that Prasanth came to the wrong address for his matchmaking event. Later, Prasanth goes to his actual matchmaking event, which was with a rich family. Meanwhile, Chitra tells the guy coming to her matchmaking event that she's not interested in marriage. The family of Prasanth's bride wanted him to be able to run a business, so he and Chitra decide to operate the food truck themselves, with Prasanth as the chef, and Chitra in charge of the business side of things. At first, they face many difficulties, mainly through Prasanth's and his friends' laziness as well as fighting with Chitra and giving up the food truck.

Prasanth visits Chitra's house and informs her father that he should be proud to have such a responsible daughter. He also claims that if he ever gets a child, he would wish to have a daughter like Chitra and insists that her father let her pursue her dreams. Chitra understands Prasanth's good nature and later convinces his father that he is a natural cook by cooking them Prasanth's recipe. They kickstart their business with the support from both their parents. After this, their food truck becomes a smashing success. In the process, they fall in love without realising it, but both of them are engaged to other people, so they drift apart. After realising they love each other, they come back together through a radio show organised by their friend, with the support of their family and friends.

== Cast ==
- Vijay Deverakonda as Prashanth
- Ritu Varma as Chitra
- Priyadarshi Pulikonda as Kaushik
- Abhay Bethiganti as Vishnu
- Nandu as Vikram
- Anish Kuruvilla as Businessman
- Kedar Shankar as Prashanth's father
- Khenisha Chandran as Richa
- Yogi Khathri as Event Manager
- Padmaja Lanka as Satya, Prashanth's mother
- Gururaj Manepalli as Chitra's father
- Sujata Gosukonda as Chitra's mother
- Anisha Alla as Prashanth's ex-girlfriend
- Keshav Deepak as Prashanth's Boss

== Production ==
=== Development ===
After making numerous short films, Tharun Bhascker made his directorial debut with this film. According to Tharun, Pelli Choopulu "is a very urban comedy set in a middle class in Hyderabad. It shows the contrast between the old and young generations and the comedy of errors that can happen within the space." Tharun had this basic idea of two contrasting personalities meeting for match-making, both getting stuck in a room is a metaphor for dating while food truck is a metaphor for live-in relationship.

=== Casting ===
Ritu Verma who earlier worked in Tharun's Anukokunda was selected as lead actress while Vijay Deverakonda, who portrayed a supporting role in Yevade Subramanyam (2015), made his debut as lead actor with this film. Vijay agreed to do this role as he found it "realistically very lazy" and "so close to my heart because young attitude, irresponsible behaviour was a part of my personal life".

=== Filming ===
Tharun shot the entire film in sync sound as he feels it offers freedom for artists to improvise their dialogues. The sync sound equipment, from Mumbai, that was used for Gangs of Wasseypur was used for this film. The filming was completed within 35 days.

=== Distribution and Box-office ===
The film's budget was ₹60 lakh to 1.2 crore. The producer had spent another ₹60 lakh on its promotion. D. Suresh Babu acquired the theatrical rights for an amount of ₹1.50 crore and released it under his banner Suresh Productions across Andhra Pradesh and Telangana.

The film collected over ₹5 crore gross at the AP/TG box office in its opening week. In five weeks, the film has grossed over ₹30 crore. The film's theatrical rights in the US had been bought for $200,000 and it went on to gross over $1.22 million, making it the biggest overseas hit in terms of return on investment.

Gemini TV had acquired its satellite rights for an amount of ₹2.35 crore.

=== Themes and influences ===
Tharun followed character arcs from Knocked Up (directed by Judd Apatow). For the food truck business thread, Tharun revealed he drew inspirations from films like 100 foot journey and Chef.

== Soundtrack ==
Pelli Choopulu

Soundtrack album to Pelli Choopulu by Vivek Sagar
- Released: 29 July 2016
- Recorded: 2016
- Studio: Tapeloop
- Genre: Feature film soundtrack
- Length: 19:18
- Language: Telugu
- Label: Madhura Audio
- Producer: Vivek Sagar

Vivek Sagar chronology
Race (2013)	Pelli Choopulu (2016)	Yuddham Sharanam (2017)

This film has six songs composed by Vivek Sagar and lyrics are written by Rahul Ramakrishna, Shreshta, Shri, & Nikhil Bharadwaj. Music released on Madhura Audio.

Vivek Sagar earlier composed music for Tharun Bhascker's short film Sainma, he revealed that the film's music was conceived only after the film was shot. "With no lip sync songs, the music blended in with the narrative", he said.

Track listing
No.	Title	Lyrics	Artist(s)	Length
1.	"Ee Babu Gariki"	Rahul Ramakrishna	Sooraj Santhosh	3:10
2.	"Chinuku Taake"	Shreshta	Amritavarshini KC	4:38
3.	"Raalu Raaga Poolamala"	Rahul Ramakrishna, Shri	Shri, Wilson Herald	3:23
4.	"Merise Merise"	Shreshta	Haricharan, Pranavi Acharya	5.04
5.	"Aanandamayenu"	Instrumental	Tejas Mallela (violin), Ranjani Sivakumar (singer)	1:41
6.	"Spitfire Friends"	Nikhil Bharadwaj	Nikhil Bharadwaj	3:22
Total length:				19:18

== Accolades ==
Award (Note: Awards are in alphabetical order.)	Date of ceremony (Note: Date is linked to the article about the awards held that year, wherever possible.)	Category	Recipient(s)	Result	Ref.
Filmfare Awards South	17 June 2017	Best Film – Telugu	Pelli Choopulu	Won	
Filmfare Awards South	17 June 2017	Best Director – Telugu	Tharun Bhascker	Nominated	
Filmfare Awards South	17 June 2017	Best Actress – Telugu	Ritu Varma	Nominated	
Filmfare Awards South	17 June 2017	Critics Best Actress – Telugu	Ritu Varma	Won	
Filmfare Awards South	17 June 2017	Best Music Director – Telugu	Vivek Sagar	Nominated	
Filmfare Awards South	17 June 2017	Best Female Playback Singer – Telugu	Amritavarshini K. C. for ("Chinuku Taake")	Nominated	
IIFA Utsavam	28 – 29 March 2017	Best Picture – Telugu	Pelli Choopulu	Nominated	
IIFA Utsavam	28 – 29 March 2017	Best Director – Telugu	Tharun Bhascker	Nominated	
IIFA Utsavam	28 – 29 March 2017	Best Story – Telugu	Tharun Bhascker	Nominated	
IIFA Utsavam	28 – 29 March 2017	Best Actor-Telugu	Vijay Deverakonda	Nominated	
IIFA Utsavam	28 – 29 March 2017	Best Actress – Telugu	Ritu Varma	Nominated	
IIFA Utsavam	28 – 29 March 2017	Best Supporting Actor – Telugu	Nandu	Nominated	
IIFA Utsavam	28 – 29 March 2017	Best Performance In A Comic Role – Telugu	Priyadarshi Pulikonda	Won	
IIFA Utsavam	28 – 29 March 2017	Best Music Director – Telugu	Vivek Sagar	Nominated	
Nandi Awards of 2016	14 November 2017	Best Feature Film	Raj Kandukuri and Yash Rangineni	Won	
Nandi Awards of 2016	14 November 2017	Best Actress	Ritu Varma	Won	
National Film Awards	3 May 2017	Best Feature Film in Telugu	Dharamapatha Creations and Tharun Bhascker	Won	
National Film Awards	3 May 2017	Best Screenplay (Dialogues)	Tharun Bhascker	Won	
South Indian International Movie Awards	30 June – 1 July 2017	Best Film (Telugu)	Pelli Choopulu – Dharmapath Creations & BigBen Cinemas	Won	
South Indian International Movie Awards	30 June – 1 July 2017	Best Debut Director (Telugu)	Tharun Bhascker	Won	
South Indian International Movie Awards	30 June – 1 July 2017	Best Actress (Telugu)	Ritu Varma	Nominated	
South Indian International Movie Awards	30 June – 1 July 2017	Best Comedian (Telugu)	Priyadarshi Pulikonda	Won	
South Indian International Movie Awards	30 June – 1 July 2017	Best Music Director (Telugu)	Vivek Sagar	Nominated	
Santosham Film Awards	12 August 2017	Best Film	Pelli Choopulu – Dharmapath Creations & BigBen Cinemas	Won	
Santosham Film Awards	12 August 2017	Best Producer	Raj Kandukuri	Won	
Santosham Film Awards	12 August 2017	Best Debut Director	Tharun Bhascker	Won	
Telangana Gaddar Film Awards	14 June 2025	Second Best Feature Film	Raj Kandukuri; Tharun Bhascker	Won	

== Remakes ==
Pelli Choopulu was remade in Hindi as Mitron (2018), in Malayalam as Vijay Superum Pournamiyum (2019), and in Tamil as Oh Manapenne! (2021). A Kannada remake Shaadi Bhagya with Gurunandan and Shraddha Srinath in the lead was being planned as of 2017.
