= Vatticherukuru =

- Village
- Interactive map of Vatticherukuru
- Location in Andhra Pradesh, India Vatticherukuru (India)
- Coordinates: 16°11′03″N 80°26′44″E
- Country: India
- State: Andhra Pradesh
- District: Guntur
- Mandal: Vatticherukuru

Population (2011)
  - Total: 3,850

Languages
  - Official: Telugu
- Time zone: UTC+5:30 (IST)
- PIN: 522212
- Telephone code: 0863
- Vehicle registration: AP

Vatticherukuru is a village in Guntur district of the Indian state of Andhra Pradesh.
