= Villa Marie Degree College =

Villa Marie Intermediate, Degree and Post Graduate College
- Established: 1991
- Academic affiliations: Osmania University
- Location: Raj Bhavan Rd, Opp. Standard Chartered Bank, Somajiguda, Hyderabad, Telangana, 500082, India; 17.4211019°N 78.4597553°E
- Campus: Urban
- Location within Telangana Location within India

Villa Marie Intermediate, Degree and Post Graduate College (established in 1991 in Hyderabad, India) is an educational institution which was started by Dr. Y. Philomena, Founder and Director. The institution was started as a modest intermediate junior college in its present confines at Somajiguda. Since then it successfully expanded into a degree college in 1996 with an affiliation to Osmania University offering bachelor's degrees in Arts, Commerce, Business Management, Science and Computer Applications and later as a post graduate institution offering master's degrees in Business Administration and Computer Applications.

== History ==
This institution was established in 1991 citing the paucity of good intermediate junior colleges for women in the Hyderabad area. Since then Villa Marie has expanded to include the Undergraduate Degree division which was started in 1996 and the Post Graduate College of Management and Computer Applications in 2000.

== Admissions ==
Admission into any intermediate course can be secured by passing in the qualifying examination telangana State Secondary Certificate / Central Board of Secondary Education / Indian Certificate of Secondary Education.

Admission into any undergraduate course can be secured by passing in intermediate or other equivalent programs with 60% and above marks.

Admission into M.B.A can be secured by a graduate of any discipline with 45% and above marks.

== Infrastructure ==
- Projectors are available for the Degree and MBA classrooms.
- The library with collection of more than 30,000 books.
- The Seminar Hall is an air-conditioned venue with seating capacity for more than 200 students. There is one on every floor equipped with a public address system and an LCD projector.
- Auditorium

== Cultural activities ==
- Villa Festa
- Exhibition

== See also ==
- Education in India
- Literacy in India
- List of institutions of higher education in Telangana
