= List of Telugu films of 2015 =

Telugu movies in 2015

This is a list of Telugu language films produced in the Tollywood in India that were released in the year 2015.

== Box office collection ==
The top films released in 2015 by worldwide box office gross revenue are as follows:

Highest-grossing films of 2015
Rank	Title	Production company(s)	Worldwide gross	Ref.
1	Baahubali: The Beginning	Arka Media Works	₹650 crore (equivalent to ₹981 crore or US$100 million in 2023)	
2	Srimanthudu	Mythri Movie Makers; G. Mahesh Babu Entertainment Pvt. Ltd	₹200 crore (equivalent to ₹302 crore or US$31 million in 2023)	
3	S/O Satyamurthy	Haarika & Hassine Creations	₹90.5 crore (equivalent to ₹137 crore or US$14 million in 2023)	
4	Gopala Gopala	North Star Entertainment, Suresh Productions	₹88.1 crore (equivalent to ₹133 crore or US$14 million in 2023)	
5	Rudhramadevi	Gunaa Team Works	₹86.92 crore (equivalent to ₹131 crore or US$14 million in 2023)	
6	Temper	Parameswara Art Productions	₹74.3 crore (equivalent to ₹112 crore or US$12 million in 2023)	
7	Bruce Lee - The Fighter	DVV Entertainments	₹60.2 crore (equivalent to ₹91 crore or US$9.4 million in 2023)	
8	Bhale Bhale Magadivoy	GA2 Pictures, UV Creations	₹50.05 crore (equivalent to ₹76 crore or US$7.8 million in 2023)	
9	Kick 2	N. T. R. Arts	₹43.5 crore (equivalent to ₹66 crore or US$6.8 million in 2023)	
10	Bengal Tiger	Sri Satya Sai Arts	₹40 crore (equivalent to ₹60 crore or US$6.3 million in 2023)	

Telugu films released in the year 2015.

== January–June ==
Opening		Title	Director	Cast	Production house	Ref
J A N	1	A Shyam Gopal Varma Film	Rakesh Srinivas	Shafi, Zoya Khan, L. B. Sriram, Jaya Prakash Reddy	Samisti Creations	
J A N	1	Mana Kurralle	Veera Sankar	Arvind Krishna, Rachana Malhotra, Krishnudu, Roopa Kaur	Veera Sanker Silver Screens	
J A N	5	Lava Kusa	Jaya Sreesivan	Varun Sandesh, Richa Panai		
J A N	9	Gopala Gopala	Kishore Kumar	Venkatesh, Pawan Kalyan, Shriya Saran, Mithun Chakraborthy	Suresh Productions and North Star Entertainment Pvt. Ltd.	
J A N	23	Pataas	Anil Ravipudi	Nandamuri Kalyan Ram, Shruti Sodhi, Sai Kumar, Ashutosh Rana	N.T.R. Arts	
J A N	23	Beeruva	Kanmani	Sundeep Kishan, Surabhi	Ramoji Rao Studios	
J A N	23	Intelligent Idiots	Balaji Sanala	Posani Krishna Murali, Vikram Shekar, Prabhjeet Kaur, Saptagiri	Spicy Creations And Sri Chejarlamma Creations	
J A N	30	Top Rankers	Gollapati Nageshwara Rao	Rajendra Prasad, Sony Charistha	Vishwa Vision Films	
J A N	30	Ladies & Gentleman	P B Manjunath	Adivi Sesh, Chaitanya Krishna, Kamal Kamaraju, Nikitha Narayan	PL Creations & Shirdi Sai Combines	
F E B	3	O Manasa	Sahaja Rao	Ajay, Aparna Bajpai		
F E B	6	Dorakadu	Varaprasad	Sivaji, Gayathri Iyer, Suman, Ajay, Babu Mohan	Chandrakala Art Creations	
F E B	6	Gaddam Gang	Santhosh P. Jayakumar	Rajasekhar, Sheena Shahabadi, Naresh, Seetha	Shiva Shivatmika Movies	
F E B	6	Malli Malli Idi Rani Roju	Kranthi Madhav	Sharwanand, Nithya Menen, Tejaswi Madivada, Nassar, Pavitra Lokesh	Creative Commercials	
F E B	6	Moodu Mukkallo Cheppalante	Madhumitha	Rakendu Mouli, Aditi Chengappa, Venkatesh Harinathan	Capital Film Works	
F E B	6	Pesarattu	Mahesh Kathi	Nandu, Nikitha Narayan, Sampoornesh Babu	Chandrakala Art Creations	
F E B	13	Temper	Puri Jagannadh	N. T. Rama Rao Jr., Kajal Aggarwal, Prakash Raj	Parameswara Art Productions	
F E B	14	Paddanandi Premalo Mari	Mahesh Upputuri	Varun Sandesh, Vithika Sheru	Panchajanya media	
F E B	20	Bandipotu	Mohan Krishna Indraganti	Allari Naresh, Eesha Rebba, Srinivas Avasarala, Rao Ramesh, Tanikella Bharani	EVV Cinema	
F E B	20	Nuvvu Nenu Okatavudaam	P. Narasimha Reddy	Ranjith Swamy, Sana, Ali, Jaya Prakash Reddy	G K R Productions	
F E B	20	Gayakudu	Kamal. G	Ali Reza, Shriya Sharma, Santosh Pawan, M S Narayana, Sapta Giri		
F E B	27	Bham Bolenath	Karthik Varma Dandu	Navdeep, Naveen Chandra, Pooja Jhaveri	RCC Entertainments	
F E B	27	Ramleela	Kiran	Havish, Abijeet, Nanditha Raj	SLB Films Rawail Grandsons Entertainment	
M A R	5	Surya vs Surya	Karthik Ghattamaneni	Nikhil Siddharth, Tanikella Bharani, Tridha Choudhary	Surakh Entertainments	
M A R	6	Naakaithe Nachindi	Trinadh Kosuru	Sri Balaji, Soni Charistha, Rishika Jairath, Krishna		
M A R	6	Anandam Malli Modalaindi	Akash	Jai Akash, Jiya Khan, Alekhya, Thagubothu Ramesh	Devi Movies	
M A R	13	Tommy	Raja Vannemreddy	Rajendra Prasad, Seetha, Deepak, Mumtaj, Suresh, Raghu Babu	Babu Pictures	
M A R	13	Thappatadugu	Sri Aarun	Surya Teja, Naveena Jackson, Lakshman Meesala, Surabhi	ASSV Ateliers and Violet Kites	
M A R	20	Calling Bell	Panna Royal	Ravi Verma, mamatha Rahuth, Vriti Khanna, Kishore, Jeeva, Chanti, Shankar, Venu	Golden Time Pictures	
M A R	20	Tungabhadra	Srinivas Gogineni	Adith Arun, Dimple Chopade	Varahi Chalana Chitram	
M A R	20	Yevade Subramanyam	Nag Ashwin	Nani, Vijay Deverakonda, Malavika Nair, Ritu Varma	Vyjayanthi Movies	
M A R	20	Janda Pai Kapiraju	Samuthirakani	Nani, Amala Paul, Ragini Dwivedi, Tanikella Bharani	Vasan Visual Ventures	
M A R	27	Rey	YVS Chowdary	Sai Dharam Tej, Saiyami Kher, Shraddha Das, Tanikella Bharani	Bommarillu films	
M A R	27	Jil	Radha Krishna	Gopichand, Raashi Khanna, Kabir Duhan Singh, Harish Uthaman	UV Creations	
A P R	3	Avunu 2	Ravi Babu	Harshvardhan Rane, Poorna, Ravi Babu, Sanjjanaa, Nikita Thukral	Flying Frogs, Suresh Productions	
A P R	9	S/O Satyamurthy	Trivikram Srinivas	Allu Arjun, Upendra, Samantha, Nithya Menen, Sneha, Adah Sharma, Prakash Raj, Rajendra Prasad	Haarika & Hassine Creations	
A P R	17	Budugu	Manmohan	Lakshmi Manchu, Indraja, Sridhar, Sana, Indu, Vani	Hyderabad Film Innovaties	
A P R	17	Varadhi	Kartikeya	Kranthi, Sri Divya	Vivekanand Varma	
A P R	17	Noothi Lo Kappalu	Chanti Gnamami	Rajendra Prasad, Pari Singh		
A P R	23	Kai Raja Kai	Siva Ganesh	Josh Ravi, Maanas, Ram Khanna, Shravya, Shamili	Maruthi Talkies	
A P R	24	Dohchay	Sudheer Varma	Naga Chaitanya, Kriti Sanon, Brahmanandam, Rao Ramesh	Sri Venkateswara Cine Chitra	
M A Y	8	Dongaata	Vamsi Krishna	Lakshmi Manchu, Adivi Sesh, Brahmanandam, Pragathi	Manchu Entertainment	
M A Y	8	Rajahmundry ki 50 km duramloo	Vijay Surya	Hemanth, Nairuthi,	Nishant Art Productions	
M A Y	9	Dagudumootha Dandakor	R.K Malineni	Rajendra Prasad, Sara Arjun, Ravi Prakash	Ushakiran Movies	
M A Y	14	Lion	Satyadeva	Nandamuri Balakrishna, Trisha Krishnan, Radhika Apte, Prakash Raj	SLV cinema	
M A Y	15	Dhee Ante Dhee	Srinivasa Rao	Srikanth, Sonia Mann, Posani Krishna Murali, Brahmanandam	Mahalakshmi Enterprises	
M A Y	22	Mosagallaku Mosagadu	AN Bose	Sudheer Babu, Nandini Rai, Abhimanyu	Lakshmi Narasimha Entertainments	
M A Y	22	365 Days	RGV	Nandoo, Anaika Soti	RGV	
M A Y	29	Pandaga Chesko	Gopichand Malineni	Ram, Rakul, Sonal Chauhan, Brahmanandam, Sampath Raj, Abhimanyu Singh	United Movies	
J U N	5	Andhra Pori	Raj Mudiraju	Akash Puri, Ulka Gupta	Ramesh Prasad	
J U N	5	Asura	Krishna Vijay	Nara Rohit, Priya Banerjee	Devas Media; Kushal Cinema; Aran Media Works	
J U N	5	Singam 123	Akshat Sharma	Sampoornesh Babu	24 Frames Factory	
J U N	12	Jyothi Lakshmi	Puri Jagannadh	Charmy Kaur	C.K Entertainments	
J U N	12	Lava Kusa	Jay	Varun Sandesh, Richa Panai, Babu Mohan, Brahmanandam	Prakash	
J U N	12	Kerintha	Kiran	Sumanth, Sri Divya, Tejaswi	SVC	
J U N	19	Krishnamma Kalipindi Iddarini	R. Chandru	Sudheer Babu, Nanditha, M.S. Narayana, Saptagiri	Sridhar Lagadapati	
J U N	19	Tippu	Jagadish	Karthik, Kanika, Chalapathi Rao, Krishna Bhagavan	Raju	
J U N	19	Vinavayya Ramayya	Prasad	Anvesh, Kruthika, Prakash Raj, Brahmanandam	Saraswathi Films	
J U N	26	Jadoogadu	Yogie	Naga Shourya, Sonarika, Ajay, Kota Srinivasa Rao, Saptagiri	Sathya Entertainments	
J U N	26	Tiger	Anand	Sundeep Kishan, Seerat Kapoor, Rahul Ravindran	Madhu	
J U N	26	Where Is Vidya Balan	Srinivas	Prince, Sethi	Venu	

== July–December ==
Opening		Title	Director	Cast	Production house	Ref
J U L	1	Mantra 2	Satish	Charmme Kaur, Chethan Cheenu	Teja Films	
J U L	3	Superstar Kidnap	A.Sushanth Reddy	Nandu, Aadarsh Balakrishna, Bhupal, Poonam Kaur	Lucky Creations	
J U L	3	The Bells	Nellutla Praveen Chander	Ryan Rahul, Neha Deshpande	Jagadhamba Productions	
J U L	10	Baahubali: The Beginning	S.S. Rajamouli	Prabhas, Rana, Tamannaah, Anushka Shetty, Satyaraj, Ramya Krishnan, Nassar	Arka Media Works	
J U L	24	James Bond	Sai Kishore Macha	Allari Naresh, Sakshi Chaudhary	AK Films	
J U L	31	Mirchi Lanti Kurradu	Jayanag	Abijeet, Pragya Jaiswal	Sri Lakshmi Venkateshwara Cinema	
A U G	7	Srimanthudu	Koratala Siva	Mahesh Babu, Shruti Haasan, Jagapathi Babu, Mukesh Rishi, Rajendra Prasad, Sampath Raj, Harish Uthaman	Mythri Movie Makers; G. Mahesh Babu Entertainment Pvt. Ltd	
A U G	14	Cinema Choopistha Mava	Trinadha Rao Nakkina	Raj Tarun, Avika Gor		
A U G	21	Kick 2	Surender Reddy	Ravi Teja, Rakul Preet Singh, Ravi Kishan, Kabir Duhan Singh, Ashish Vidyarthi, Brahmanandam, Rajpal Yadav	N.T.R. Arts	|
A U G	31	Best Actors	Arun Pawar	Nandu, Madhurima, Madhunandan, Kesha, Varshini Soundaryarajan	Maruthi Team Works	
S E P	4	Dynamite	Deva Katta	Manchu Vishnu, Pranitha Subhash, J. D. Chakravarthy	24 Frames Factory	
S E P	4	Bhale Bhale Magadivoy	Maruthi	Nani, Lavanya Tripathi, Murali Sharma	Geetha Arts; UV Creations	
S E P	17	Courier Boy Kalyan	Premsai	Nithiin, Yami Gautam	Photon Kathaas	
S E P	18	Ketagadu		Tejus Kancherla, Chandini Chowdary		
S E P	24	Subramanyam For Sale	Harish Shankar	Sai Dharam Tej, Regina Cassandra, Adah Sharma, Brahmanandam	SVC	
S E P	25	Chandrika	Yogesh	Jayram Karthik, Kamna Jethmalani, Srimukhi, Girish Karnad, Satyam Rajesh	Flying Wheels Productions	
O C T	2	Shivam	Srinivas Reddy	Ram, Raashi Khanna, Abhimanyu Singh	Sri Sravanthi Movies	
O C T	9	Rudhramadevi	Gunasekhar	Anushka Shetty, Allu Arjun, Rana Daggubati, Krishnam Raju, Prakash Raj	Gunaa Team Works	
O C T	16	Bruce Lee	Srinu Vaitla	Ram Charan, Rakul Preet Singh, Kriti Kharbanda, Arun Vijay, Brahmanandam	DVV Entertainments	
O C T	22	Kanche	Krish	Varun Tej, Pragya Jaiswal, Nikitin Dheer, Srinivas Avasarala	First Frame Entertainment	
O C T	22	Columbus	R Samala	Sumanth Ashwin, Seerat Kapoor, Mishti Chakraborty	Ashwani Kumar Sehdev	
O C T	22	Raju Gari Gadhi	Omkar	Ashwin Babu, Dhanya Balakrishna	Oak Entertainments	
O C T	30	Sher	Mallikarjun	Kalyan Ram, Sonal Chauhan, Vikramjeet Virk, Mukesh Rishi	Vijayalakshmi Pictures	
N O V	6	Tripura	Raj Kiran	Colors Swathi, Naveen Chandra, Saptagiri, Rao Ramesh	Crazy Media Pvt Ltd.	
N O V	6	Red Alert	Chandra Mahesh	H. H. Mahadev, Anjana Menon, Suman, Vinod Kumar Alva, Posani Krishna Murali, Ali	Cine Nilaya Creations LLP	
N O V	11	Akhil	Vinayak	Akhil Akkineni, Sayyeshaa, Rajendra Prasad, Mahesh Manjrekar, Brahmanandam, Vennela Kishore	Shresht Movies	
N O V	20	Kumari 21F	Surya Pratap	Raj Tarun, Heebah Patel	PA Motion Pictures	
N O V	20	Cheekati Rajyam	Rajesh	Kamal Haasan, Trisha, Prakash Raj	RKFI	
N O V	27	Size Zero	Prakash	Arya, Anushka, Sonal Chauhan	PVP	
N O V	27	Thanu Nenu	Ram Mohan	Santosh Sobhan, Avika Gor	Viacom 18	
D E C	4	Veediki Dookudekkuva	SatyaNarayana	Srikanth, Kamna Jethmalani	Pushyami Film Makers	
D E C	4	Sankarabharanam	Uday	Nikhil, Nanditha	MVV Cinema	
D E C	10	Bengal Tiger	Sampath Nandi	Ravi Teja, Tamannaah Bhatia, Boman Irani, Raashi Khanna	Sri Satya Sai Arts	
D E C	11	Hitudu	Viplav	Jagapathi Babu, Meera Nandan	KSV Films	
D E C	11	Anaganaga Oka Chitram	J. Prabhakar Reddy	Shiva, Meghashree		
D E C	12	Kaki: Sound of Warning	Manon M	Ashok, Meghashree, Sangeetha Bhat, Kiran Pattikonda	Arpita Creations	
D E C	17	Loafer	Puri Jagannadh	Varun Tej, Disha Patani	C. K. Entertainments	
D E C	19	Taskara	Chandra Sekhar			
D E C	24	Soukhyam	AS Ravi Kumar Chowdhary	Gopichand, Regina Cassandra, Mukesh Rishi, Pradeep Rawat	Bhavya Creations	
D E C	25	Bhale Manchi Roju	Sriram Adittya. T	Sudheer Babu, Wamiqa Gabbi, Dhanya Balakrishna, Sai Kumar	70MM Entertainments	
D E C	25	Mama Manchu Alludu Kanchu	Sriniwass Reddy	Mohan Babu, Allari Naresh, Varun Sandesh, Poorna, Meena, Ramya Krishna	24 Frames Factory	
D E C	25	Jatha Kalise	Rakesh Sashii	Ashwin Babu, Tejaswi Madivada, Snigdha, Shakalaka Shankar, Dhanaraj	Yukta Creations; Varahi Chalana Chitram	

== See also ==
- List of Telugu films of 2014
- Lists of Telugu-language films
- List of Telugu films of 2016
