= Balu Charan =

Indian actor and producer

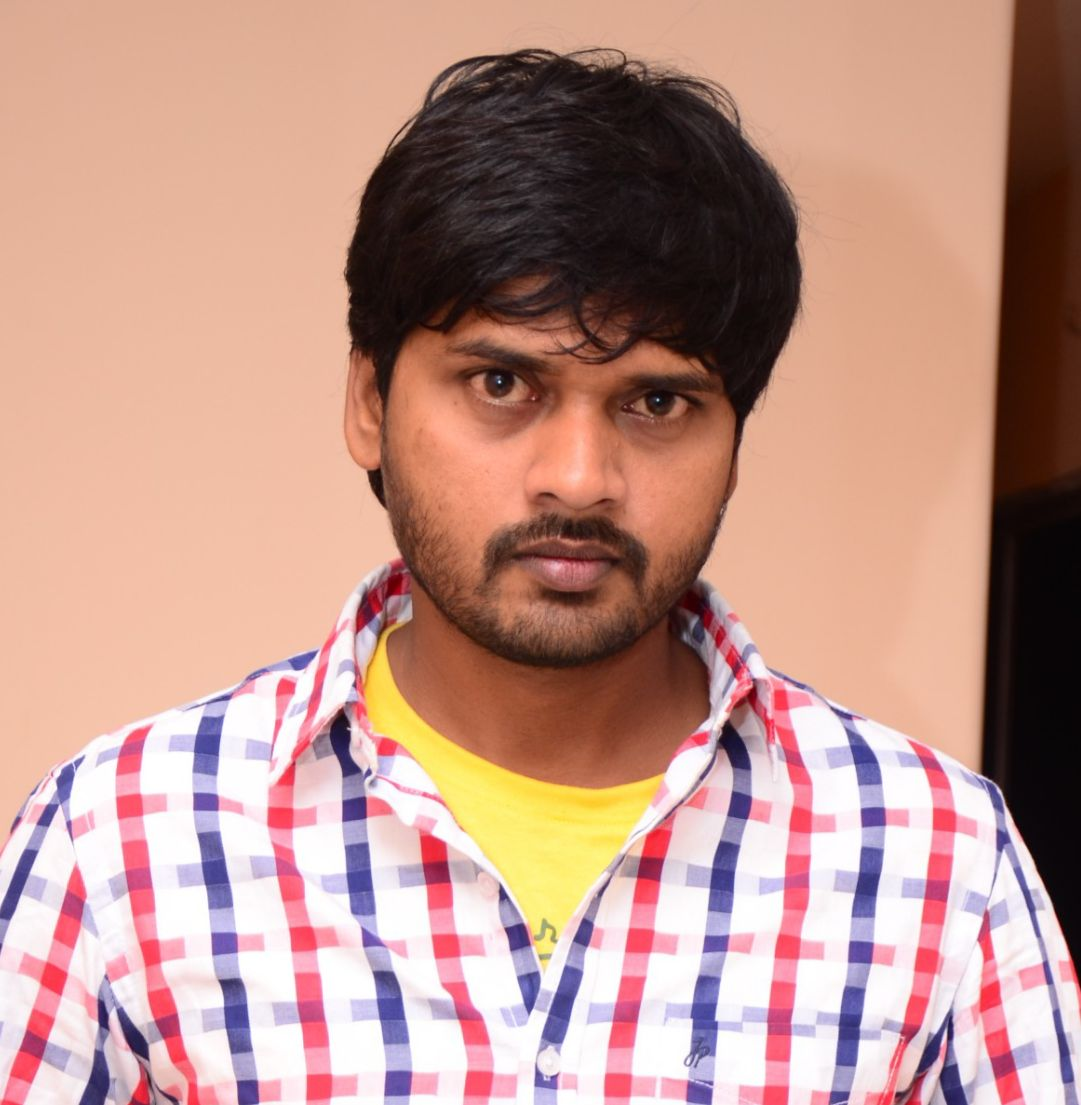
- Born: 11 November 1991 (age 34); Palakollu, India
- Occupations: Actor; Film distributor; Film Producer
- Years active: 2006-Present

Balu Charan is an Indian actor and producer associated with Telugu cinema. He began his acting career in 2006 with Godava, in which he played the hero's friend, and later worked in business and film distribution while continuing to act. In 2026, he acted in lead role in a movie for the first time in the movie Sugriva.

== Early life ==
Balu Charan was born in Palakollu. His father was a farmer, and his mother was a housewife.

== Career ==
Balu Charan started his career in Telugu Film Industry in 2006, where he played as a friend to the hero in the movie Godava. From then on he continued to play side roles in movies like Bangaru Babu, Mirapakaya, and Lava Kusa.

To sustain himself in the industry Balu Charan started doing business as a film distributor. He started a film distribution and film production company, Hanuman Media Movies, and bought the rights for the movies and has released the movies Super Machi, Shakhahaari, Kalaratri, Nene Naa, Kajal Karthika, Teenagers 17/18, Katha Kanchiki Manam Intiki, and Garuda 2.0, in Telugu language.

In 2026, Balu Charan has finally had his breakthrough as a lead actor in the Telugu movie Sugriva.

Balu Charan has signed for a horror thriller movie as the main lead, and the film has entered pre-production in Hyderabad.

== Filmography ==
=== As Actor ===
- Sugriva
- Lavakusa
- Ankit Pallavi and Friends
- Simran 21F
- Corporator
- Tom and Jerry
- Godava

=== As Film Distributor and Producer ===
- Srimathi 21F
- Super Machi
- Katha Kanchiki Manam Intiki
- Neetho
- Gandharwa
- Nene Naa
- Kajal Karthika
- Boomer Uncle
- Teenagers 17/18
- Garuda 2.0
- Kalaratri
- Son Of
