= Baby (2023 film) =

2023 Indian film directed by Sai Rajesh

- Theatrical release poster
- Directed by: Sai Rajesh Neelam
- Written by: Sai Rajesh Neelam
- Produced by: Sreenivasa Kumar Naidu (SKN)
- Starring: Vaishnavi Chaitanya; Anand Deverakonda; Viraj Ashwin
- Cinematography: M. N. Balreddy
- Edited by: Viplav Nyshadam
- Music by: Vijai Bulganin
- Production company: Mass Movie Makers
- Release date: 13 July 2023
- Running time: 175 minutes
- Country: India
- Language: Telugu
- Budget: ₹10 crore
- Box office: est. ₹80 crore

Baby is a 2023 Indian Telugu-language coming of age romantic drama film directed by Sai Rajesh Neelam and produced by Sreenivasa Kumar Naidu (SKN), under Mass Movie Makers. The film features Vaishnavi Chaitanya, Anand Deverakonda, and Viraj Ashwin in the lead roles and the music is composed by Vijai Bulganin.

Baby was released on 13 July 2023 to positive reviews from critics and audiences and emerged as a major success at the box office grossing over ₹80 crore (US$8.3 million) becoming the tenth highest-grossing Telugu film of the year.

== Plot ==
Vaishnavi and Anand are neighours and high school students, who live in a slum in Hyderabad. Anand has a troubled relationship with his mother as she is mute and deaf, although she loves him dearly. Vaishnavi has a crush on Anand, but he does not acknowledge her until one day when she stands up to their teacher. Anand reciprocates her feelings, and they eventually start a relationship. Three years later, Vaishnavi goes on to join a prestigious Engineering college while Anand drops out of college due to bad grades. He takes to driving an auto for a living.

Anand mortgages his auto to buy a smartphone for Vaishnavi. However, he has a hard time repaying the loan. Vaishnavi, meanwhile, has a hard time fitting in with the wealthier, modern students of her college. She befriends classmates Viraj and Seetha, and tries her best to integrate into their social circle. Viraj is attracted to Vaishnavi, who hides the fact that she is in a relationship with Anand. Enamoured by the glitzy and glamorous life of her new friends and angered by Anand's increasingly abusive and controlling attitude, Vaishnavi starts to grow emotionally distant from Anand and closer to Viraj. Viraj gifts Vaishnavi a new iPhone, causing her and Anand to have an argument when she discards and belittles the smartphone Anand got for her, unaware he was slapped by the loan shark in front of his mother.

Seetha becomes envious of Vaishnavi as she believes that Vaishnavi is from the lower class and does not deserve Viraj's attention. At Viraj's birthday party, Vaishnavi becomes conflicted when Anand leaves several voicemails apologising to her and Viraj professes his love for her. In an inebriated state and angry at Anand, she texts Anand that she loves him before kissing Viraj, which is captured on the premises' CCTV. She realises her mistake, but Viraj continues to pursue her and asks her to marry him. When she angrily rejects him, he threatens to reveal their kissing video. Using these situations to her advantage, Seetha manipulates Vaishnavi and Viraj against each other. In an attempt to get rid of Viraj, Vaishnavi has a one-night stand with him. Later, she drinks to forget her infidelity and confesses the same to Seetha, which is secretly recorded by Anand's friend, Harsha. Seetha shares the kissing video as well with Harsha, who in turn, shares Vaishnavi's confession and the recording of Vaishnavi and Viraj kissing with Anand.

Anand discovers everything that has been going on between Vaishnavi and Viraj and in a fit of rage tries to murder Vaishnavi in her sleep but fails and breaks down in tears. Meanwhile, Seetha informs Viraj that Vaishnavi has had a boyfriend since tenth grade. When confronted publicly by both men, a guilt-ridden Vaishnavi attempts suicide. Anand and Viraj are both arrested, but are released on bail. Vaishnavi is hospitalised and recovers. Anand realises the harsh way he treated his mother and decides to apologise to her, but she passes away that night, causing him to slip into depression. On her father's advice, Vaishnavi finds an emotionally disturbed Anand sleeping at a bridge near a train station. She tries to apologise to him but Anand is unable to forgive her and begs Vaishnavi to leave him alone. Heartbroken, she obliges for his sake.

In the epilogue, Anand comes up on Vaishnavi's wedding procession while picking up a passenger. As Vaishnavi and her husband are about to leave her home, she and Anand exchange a glance before he drives away in tears. The film ends with Anand's emotional state and a photo of a younger Vaishnavi in his auto, showing that they loved each other but circumstances and destiny had something else in store for them.

== Cast ==
- Vaishnavi Chaitanya as Vaishnavi "Vaishu"
- Anand Deverakonda as Anand
- Viraj Ashwin as Viraj
- Nagendra Babu as Vaishnavi's father
- Lirisha Kunapareddy as Vaishnavi's mother
- Prabhavati Varma as Anand's mother
- Kirrak Seetha as Seetha
- Harsha Chemudu as Harsha
- Kusuma Degalamarri as Kusuma
- Sathvik Anand Bandela as Sathvik

== Production ==
Baby is the third directorial venture of Sai Rajesh, previously known for directing the parody films Hrudaya Kaleyam (2014) and Kobbari Matta (2019). Rajesh initially pitched the idea of the story after he saw an incident happened in Salem, Tamil Nadu, where a girl was murdered by the two boys whom he had dating. Considering the idea he had in mind, he discussed some of the situations related to his friends living in United States and Canada, and how they would react for the incidents. Rajesh then began the project without having a bounded script and had the characters in mind. Anand Deverakonda, Viraj Ashwin and Vaishnavi Chaitanya were selected for the lead roles. Before Anand was chosen as one of the leads, Rajesh narrated the script to three other actors, but recalled that they were skeptic on accepting the offer owing to the director's previous works.

"The biggest mental pressure I was experiencing for the past three years was that apart from the time I was sleeping, my mind would only think about Anand, Vaishnavi and Viraj. That’s all I was thinking about. I would get tired of thinking about their thoughts and perspectives. In the morning, after going to the shooting spot, I would write dialogues [...] It would keep evolving in my head nonstop. And when the shooting day arrives, I would finally write the dialogues because it had to be done."

— Sai Rajesh on filming Baby without a bound script

Rajesh considered Baby to be a "tough film" to be written and executed as the film began without a bound script. He wrote the dialogues at the shooting spot before filming would begin. He would also discuss with the associates regarding on specific scenes to be filmed and before that he would contact them to send a revised version of the scene, before they would proceed with the shoot. Much of the scenes were improvised even before filming began, with Rajesh stated "while filming Viraj’s scene that counters Anand’s dialogue about the value he gives to Vaishnavi, I looked back at the original scene and write the new scene accordingly". The film which began production for two years was completed by June 2023.

== Themes and influences ==
Sai Rajesh noted that he was confused on how to build the three lead characters. He was influenced by the works of K. Balachander and Balu Mahendra on presenting flawed but strong female characters. This served as the reference of Vaishnavi's character, a girl living in the slum trying to adapt after and fit in with the wealthy friends' circle. The song "Ribapappa" was a tribute to the "Raja Raja Cholan" from Rettai Vaal Kuruvi (1987). Rajesh admitted that Arjun Reddy (2017) and RX100 (2018) were not his reference points, even though the lead male protagonists were flawed. Being aware of the gender issues in Arjun Reddy, he included a dialogue where Vaishnavi calling out Anand's controlling and aggressive behavior as a reference to the titular protagonist in the film, played by Anand's elder brother Vijay Deverakonda.

== Music ==
The music was composed by Vijai Bulganin with lyrics written by Anantha Sriram, Kalyan Chakravarthy and Suresh Banisetti. Bulganin considered the album to be an homage to Ilaiyaraaja and used live instrumentation for recording the songs. The album was released through Sony Music India on 6 July 2023.

== Release ==
Baby was released theatrically on 13 July 2023. The post-theatrical streaming rights were acquired by Aha and was premiered on 24 August 2023. Television satellite premiere rights were acquired by ETV.

== Reception ==
=== Critical reception ===
Raghu Bandi of The Indian Express stated that "Looking at the slapstick comedy films Sai Rajesh did earlier, Baby is a shockingly deep and emotional writing that asks viewers many questions [...] This film will be as divisive as Arjun Reddy. There will be lengthy discussions on the moral ambiguities, the characters and the ending. Talking about the commercial success of the film would be too soon, but this film is sure to be mentioned in the list of cult classics like 7/G Brindavan Colony, Premiste, RX 100 and Arjun Reddy." Neeshita Nyayapati of The Times of India wrote that "Baby might leave you with mixed feelings, but it's also the kind of film that'll incite conversations – for better or worse. And maybe that's the point of it all!" Tamma Moksha of The Hindu wrote that "Eventually, Baby runs like a moral story with the protagonist actually spelling out the moral three-fourths into the movie."

B. V. S. Prakash of Deccan Chronicle wrote that "[Sai Rajesh] takes the clichéd template of two heroes and one girl triangular romance and adds pubs, students and cuss words to give it a modern tweak. But the second half turns judgemental and defines how a woman should be, which is as old as hills and smacks of chauvinism. [Rajesh] wanted to engage the audience riding on confusions in youngsters in dealing with relationships, but falls flat barring some moments." Abhilasha Cherukuri of Cinema Express wrote "For a film that deals with something so intimate and humble in scale — first love, growing up, infidelity, heartbreak and regrets — Director Sai Rajesh mounts it with an assured grandeur [...] What gives Baby its edge is the way it presents two varying arguments about the film’s central love story at the same time."

Ram Venkat Srikar of Film Companion South wrote "Like with every film, your response to Baby is going to be heavily dependent on your worldview and personal experience. With Baby, these factors might matter a little bit more while evaluating it because such is the nature of the story. And that's exactly why Baby earns the title of being the most interesting, ambiguous, and debatable Telugu film of the year so far." Latha Srinivasan of India Today wrote "At 2 hours and 40 minutes, the film was way too long and should have been edited better. There are lags in the film and it tests your patience. But Vaishnavi's performance keeps you engaged even though the story is full of cliches." However, The News Minute-based critic had summarized that, "At best, Baby is a story of sugar-coated patriarchy and at worst, it is an ‘advisory’ against the havoc apparently wreaked when a woman aspires to live outside the boundaries drawn by those who dictate her life."

Suresh Kavirayani of the Chitrajyothy Telugu News praised Sai Rajesh's direction.

=== Box office ===
Baby concluded its run with the worldwide gross estimated to be ₹80 crore.

== Remake ==
In July 2024, it was announced that the film will be remade in Hindi with producers Madhu Mantena and Allu Aravind backing the project. Initially Babil Khan and Yashvardhan Ahuja—son of veteran actor Govinda, in his supposed film debut—were chosen to play the lead male roles. But Khan left the project due to an online argument between him and Rajesh, though the former claimed that things did not go as planned. The project was eventually put on hold a week later. Later, it was reported that Aaishvary Thackeray would replace Babil as one of the leads.

== Plagiarism allegations ==
On 11 February 2024, director Shirin Sriram lodged a complaint with Raidurgam police in Hyderabad claiming that the Baby film closely resembled his script Kanna Please (later titled Preminchoddu). Sriram mentioned in the complaint that Rajesh had initially shown interest in producing the project but later abandoned it. Police acknowledged the complaint and initiated an investigation.

== Accolades ==
Award (Note: Awards, festivals and organizations are in alphabetical order.)	Date of ceremony (Note: Date is linked to the article about the awards held that year, wherever possible.)	Category	Recipient(s)	Result	Ref.
Filmfare Awards South	3 August 2024	Best Film – Telugu	Sreenivasa Kumar Naidu	Nominated	
Filmfare Awards South	3 August 2024	Best Film (Critics) – Telugu	Sreenivasa Kumar Naidu	Won	
Filmfare Awards South	3 August 2024	Best Actor – Telugu	Anand Deverakonda	Nominated	
Filmfare Awards South	3 August 2024	Best Actress (Critics) – Telugu	Vaishnavi Chaitanya	Won	
Filmfare Awards South	3 August 2024	Best Actress – Telugu	Vaishnavi Chaitanya	Nominated	
Filmfare Awards South	3 August 2024	Best Music Director – Telugu	Vijai Bulganin	Won	
Filmfare Awards South	3 August 2024	Best Lyricist – Telugu	Anantha Sriram ("O Rendu Prema Meghaalila")	Won	
Filmfare Awards South	3 August 2024	Best Male Playback Singer – Telugu	P V N S Rohit ("Premisthunna")	Nominated	
Filmfare Awards South	3 August 2024	Best Male Playback Singer – Telugu	Sreerama Chandra ("O Rendu Prema Meghaalila")	Won	
Filmfare Awards South	3 August 2024	Best Director – Telugu	Sai Rajesh	Nominated	
National Film Awards	1 August 2025	Best Screenplay	Sai Rajesh	Won	
National Film Awards	1 August 2025	Best Male Playback Singer	P V N S Rohit ("Premisthunna")	Won	
Santosham Film Awards	2 December 2023	Best Producer	Sreenivasa Kumar Naidu	Won	
Santosham Film Awards	2 December 2023	Best Director	Sai Rajesh	Won	
Santosham Film Awards	2 December 2023	Best Actor	Anand Deverakonda	Won	
Santosham Film Awards	2 December 2023	Best Debut Actress	Vaishnavi Chaitanya	Won	
South Indian International Movie Awards	14 September 2024	Best Film – Telugu	Sreenivasa Kumar Naidu	Nominated	
South Indian International Movie Awards	14 September 2024	Best Director – Telugu	Sai Rajesh	Nominated	
South Indian International Movie Awards	14 September 2024	Best Supporting Actor – Telugu	Viraj Ashwin	Nominated	
South Indian International Movie Awards	14 September 2024	Best Female Debut – Telugu	Vaishnavi Chaitanya	Won	
South Indian International Movie Awards	14 September 2024	Best Music Director – Telugu	Vijai Bulganin	Nominated	
South Indian International Movie Awards	14 September 2024	Best Lyricist – Telugu	Anantha Sriram ("O Rendu Prema Meghaalila")	Won	
South Indian International Movie Awards	14 September 2024	Critics Best Actor – Telugu	Anand Deverakonda	Won	
South Indian International Movie Awards	14 September 2024	Critics Best Director – Telugu	Sai Rajesh	Won	
