= It's My Love Story =

Indian Telugu-language romantic drama film

- DVD Cover
- Directed by: Madhura Sreedhar Reddy
- Screenplay by: Madhura Sreedhar Reddy
- Story by: Madhura Sreedhar Reddy
- Produced by: Dr. M. V. K. Reddy
- Starring: Arvind Krishna; Nikitha Narayan
- Cinematography: P. G. Vinda
- Music by: Sunil Kashyap
- Release date: 11 November 2011
- Country: India
- Language: Telugu

It's My Love Story is a 2011 Indian Telugu-language romantic drama film directed by Madhura Sreedhar Reddy and starring Arvind Krishna (in his lead debut) and newcomer Nikitha Narayan. Author Chetan Bhagat attended the film's premiere. The film released to negative reviews while the songs were praised.

== Cast ==
- Arvind Krishna as Arjun
- Nikitha Narayan as Vandana
- Jayasudha as Lakshmi, Vandana's mother
- Sarath Babu as Srinivasa Rao, Vandana's father
- Pragathi as Arjun's mother
- Kasi Vishwanath as Arjun's father
- Vennela Kishore as Sujath A., Vandana's gay boss
- Vennela Rama Rao as Varma
- RJ Ghajini as Peter
- Thagubothu Ramesh as Poola Babji, the drunk flower seller
- Sundeep Kishan (cameo appearance in the song "Gallate")
- Shifa Aqil (cameo appearance in the song "Gallate")

== Soundtrack ==
Songs by Sunil Kashyap. Songs were released on Madhura Audio.

- "Gallate" – Pranavi, Sunil Kashyap
- "Muppai Sekanley" – Hemachandra, Sunil Kashyap, Pranavi, Nikitha Nigam
- "Neeloni Digule" – Pranavi
- "Nindaina Nee Chelimi" – Karunya, Pranavi
- "Ninnala Lede" – Chithra, Dinker
- "Thadi Pedavule Kalis" – Karunya, Chithra

== Reception ==
A critic from The Times of India wrote that "The plot is uninteresting and the actors are too inexperienced to rise above it. Innovative screen play could have still salvaged the film, but that doesn’t happen either". Radhika Rajamani of Rediff.com opined that "It's My Love Story is a disappointing film with nothing to engage the audience". Y. Sunitha Chowdhary of The Hindu wrote that "The story could have been simple and straight [...] but the plot turns labyrinthine with the sudden change in behaviour and character of Sarat Babu".

== Awards and nominations ==
- South Indian International Movie Awards
  - Best Male Debut – Telugu - Aravind Krishna - Nominated
  - Best Female Debut – Telugu - Nikitha Narayan - Nominated
