= Love Life & Pakodi =

2021 Indian Telugu-language film

- Love Life & Pakodi poster
- Directed by: Jayanth Gali
- Written by: Jayanth Gali
- Produced by: Jayanth Gali; Madhura Sreedhar Reddy
- Starring: Bimal Kartheek Rebba; Sanchitha Poonacha
- Cinematography: Sagar YVV; Jithin Mohan
- Edited by: Shravan Katikaneni
- Music by: Pavan
- Production company: Color of My Ink Films
- Release date: 12 March 2021
- Running time: 115 Minutes
- Country: India
- Language: Telugu

Love Life & Pakodi is a 2021 Indian Telugu-language romantic drama film written and directed by Jayanth Gali. The film is produced by Jayanth Gali under the banner Color of My Ink Films and Madhura Sreedhar Reddy on the banner Madhura Entertainment, features Bimal Kartheek Rebba, Sanchitha Poonacha, Krishna Hebbale, Kalajyothi, Anuradha Mallikarjun, Akarsh Raj Bagavatula in pivotal roles. The film released on 12 March 2021.

== Plot ==
The plot deals with the journey of a couple, Arun and Rheya, whose relationship starts simple and reaches a complicated phase. They face the hurdles and honestly rediscover themselves at every step.

== Cast ==
- Bimal Kartheek Rebba as Arjun
- Sanchitha Poonacha as Rheya
- Krishna Hebbale
- Kalajyothi
- Anuradha Mallikarjun
- Akarsh Raj Bagavatula

== Marketing and release ==
Rana Daggubati unveiled Love Life And Pakodi trailer on 29 July 2020. Allu Sirish launched the theatrical trailer for this movie on 3 March 2021. The film released exclusively in multiplexes all over Andhra Pradesh, Telangana, Karnataka, Tamil Nadu and the United States.

== Soundtrack ==
Love Life & Pakodi

Soundtrack album by Pavan
- Recorded: 2020
- Genre: Feature film soundtrack
- Language: Telugu
- Label: Madhura Audio
- Producer: Pavan

The soundtrack album is composed by Pavan, with lyrics written by Mahesh Poloju. Madhura Audio Company released the complete soundtrack album featuring four tracks.

Track listing
| No. | Title | Lyrics | Singer(s) | Length |
|---|---|---|---|---|
| 1. | "Vedi Pakodi" | Mahesh Poloju | Anurag Kulkarni | 2:40 |
| 2. | "Kadhile Nadhilaa" | Mahesh Poloju | Krishna Tejaswi, Akanksha Bisht | 2:48 |
| 3. | "Ee Payanam" | Mahesh Poloju | Anurag Kulkarni, Ramya Behara | 3:13 |
| 4. | "Rangulanni Kalisi" | | Pavan, Raazi |

== Reception ==
The Times of India critic Thadhagadh Pathi wrote "It makes an attempt to set itself apart from the run of the mill love stories." The Hindu critic Sangeetha Devi Dundoo wrote "Love Life & Pakodi surely knows to find newer things to discuss in the boy meets girl trope." Baradwaj Rangan of Film Companion South wrote "The film depicts the doubts and insecurities of a modern relationship while deliberately avoiding the context of other relationships and society." Telangana Today wrote "Love Life & Pakodi is a story of how broken relationships can still find a way to survive."
