= Mothevari Love Story =

2025 Telugu-language web series

- Genre: Romantic comedy
- Written by: Shiva Krishna Burra
- Directed by: Shiva Krishna Burra
- Starring: Anil Geela; Varshini Reddy Junnuthula; Muralidhar Goud; Sadanna; Sujatha
- Music by: Charan Arjun
- Country of origin: India
- Original language: Telugu
- No. of seasons: 1
- No. of episodes: 7

Production
- Producers: Madhura Sreedhar Reddy; Sriram Srikanth
- Cinematography: Sreekanth Arupula
- Editor: Anil Geela
- Production companies: Madhura Entertainment; My Village Show

Original release
- Network: ZEE5
- Release: 8 August 2025 – present

Mothevari Love Story is an Indian Telugu-language romantic comedy web series written and directed by Shiva Krishna Burra. The show stars content creator Anil Geela (in his acting debut) and Varshini Reddy Junnuthula in the lead roles, with Muralidhar, Sadanna and Sujatha in supporting roles. Produced by Madhura Sreedhar Reddy and Sriram Srikanth under Madhura Entertainment and My Village Show, the series is scheduled to premiere on 8 August 2025.

== Plot ==
Parshi, a young man from Arepalli village, falls in love with Anitha, a girl from a neighboring village, and the two decide to elope. Their romance takes an unexpected turn when a hidden family secret comes to light: Parshi's grandmother, Anumavva, had been the secret mistress of Anitha’s late grandfather and was willed five acres of land by him. This revelation triggers a bitter land dispute between Anitha’s father, Sattayya, and his brother Narsing, fracturing their once-close relationship. Amid the turmoil, Anumavva proposes a solution by offering the land as dowry – she will transfer the inherited five acres if Parshi and Anitha marry, hoping to unite the families. The ensuing story unfolds as a mix of humorous misunderstandings and emotional moments, focusing on whether the young couple’s love can bridge the familial divide in their rural community.

== Cast ==
- Anil Geela as Parshi
- Varshini Reddy Junnuthula as Anitha
- Muralidhar as Sathaiah
- Sadanna as Narsing Yadav
- Sujatha as Anumavva

== Release ==
The first-look poster and title were launched at an event in Hyderabad on 9 July 2025, with actor Anand Deverakonda as chief guest. The official trailer was released in late July 2025; it features a voiceover by Priyadarshi and was launched at a Hyderabad event attended by filmmaker Tharun Bhascker. The series is scheduled to premiere on ZEE5 on 8 August 2025 in Telugu.

== Music ==
The single Ghibili Ghibili, composed by Charan Arjun and sung by Rahul Sipligunj and Mallegoda Ganga Prasad, was released in late July 2025 under Madhura Audio.
