= Seshu KMR Ponnapalli =

- Born: 1976 (age 49–50); India
- Occupations: Sound Engineer; Author; Film Director; Composer
- Years active: 2002–present

Seshu KMR Ponnapalli professionally known as Seshu KMR, is an Indian film director, music composer, sound designer, author, founder, and sound innovator from Hyderabad, India. He created the Flowsound system, which mixes sound, music, and background layers to create strong emotions in movies. World Records India calls it the world's first innovation of its kind.

Working with scientist V. Vasudeva Rao, Seshu developed bio-acoustics tools for farming to scare away wildlife using sound.

He directed the film 127B and music videos like Kala (2022), Haal-e-Dil (2023), and Jaan-e-Jahan (2023), which was a project between India and Turkey. He wrote books such as Ghost of Golkonda and Anthara-1. He has authored books like Ghost of Golkonda and Anthara-1.

He received an honorary doctorate from the University of Cuneo in Italy, for his work related to sound in Indian films. He also holds an HPhD in Sonic Psychology from the United Theological Research University, based on his studies of sound's influence on emotions in cinema.

Seshu served as creative head at Ram Gopal Varma's production company.

== Bibliography ==
- Anthara-1
- Playback: A Century of Telugu Cinema Soundtrack

== Filmography ==
Year	Title	Nature of the Title	Role	Notes
2002	Nee Thodu Kavali	Film	Sound Designer	
2014	Ice Cream	Film	Sound Designer	
2016	Anukshanam	Film	Sound Designer	
2015	365 Days	Film	Music Director	
2015	Singham 123	Film	Music Director	
2015	Affair	Film	Music Director	
2015	Inspector Gullu	Film	Music Director	
2017	127B	Film	Director, screenwriter	
2020	RedZone	Short Film	Director	
2022	Kala	Music video	Director	
2023	Haal-e-Dil	Music video	Director	
2023	Jaan-e-Jahan	Music video	Director	
2025	Vande Mataram	Music video	Director	
