= Rich Kids (disambiguation) =

Rich Kids were an English new wave band, and the name of their eponymous debut single.

Rich Kids may also refer to:

- Rich Kids (EP), 2010 EP by Megan Washington
- Rich Kid (film), 2026 film
- Rich Kids (film), 1979 film
- "Rich Kids", a song by Bea Miller from Not an Apology, 2015
- "Rich Kids", a song by the Drums from Abysmal Thoughts, 2017

== See also ==
- Rich Kidd (born 1987), Canadian hip hop artist
- Rich Kidz, American hip hop group
- Rich the Kid (born 1992), American rapper
