= Love Me If You Dare =

Love Me If You Dare may refer to:

- Love Me If You Dare (film), 2003 French-Belgian film
- Love Me (2024 Indian film), also released as Love Me If You Dare
- Love Me If You Dare (TV series), 2015 Chinese TV series
