= Preminchoddu =

2024 Indian Telugu film

- Theatrical release poster
- Directed by: Shirin Sriram
- Written by: Shirin Sriram
- Produced by: Shirin Sriram
- Starring: Anurup Reddy; Deva Malishetty; Manasa Edla; Sarika; Yashwanth Pendyala
- Cinematography: Harsha Kodali
- Edited by: Shirin Sriram
- Music by: Chaitanya Sravanthi
- Production company: Shirin Sriram Cafe
- Release date: 7 June 2024
- Running time: 154 minutes
- Language: Telugu

Preminchoddu (transl. Dont love) is a 2024 Telugu-language thriller drama film written, directed and produced by Shirin Sriram under Shirin Sriram Cafe. It stars Anurup Reddy, Deva Malishetty, Manasa Edla, Sarika and Yashwanth Pendyala in lead roles. The film was released on 7 June 2024.

== Plot ==
Lalasa, a teenage girl from a slum and a polytechnic student, has little exposure to the outside world. She becomes drawn to Kamal and Saaras, two older men. As tensions rise, jealousy and possessiveness drive them to plot against her.

== Cast ==
- Anurup Reddy as Kamal
- Deva Malishetty as Saras
- Manasa Edla
- Sarika as Lalasa
- Yashwanth Pendyala
- Sonali Garje

== Music ==
Preminchoddu

Soundtrack album by Chaitanya Sravanthi
- Released: 20 August 2024
- Recorded: 2023–24
- Genre: Feature film soundtrack
- Length: 29:01
- Language: Telugu
- Label: Mango Music

Official audio
- Audio Jukebox on YouTube

The soundtrack album was composed by Chaitanya Sravanthi, while the background score was composed by Kamran. The audio rights were acquired by Mango Music.

No.	Title	Lyrics	Singer(s)	Length
1.	"Puvvula"	Sri Sai Kiran	Geetha Madhuri	4:13
2.	"Endhuko Ila"	Sri Sai Kiran	Chaitanya Sravanthi	3:15
3.	"Na Kosam Raleva"	Sri Sai Kiran	Srinidhi Sriprakash	4:41
4.	"Kalavarinthala"	Sri Sai Kiran	Vaishnavi Vemavarapu	3:42
5.	"Na Venta Sagina"	Sri Sai Kiran	Monica Rajendran	4:42
6.	"Nee Jathe Cherithey"	Sri Sai Kiran	Anjana Sowmya	5:06
7.	"Vinipinche Paatalo"	Sri Sai Kiran	Anjana Sowmya	4:42
Total length:				20.01

== Release ==
=== Theatrical ===
Preminchoddu was made in five languages: Telugu, Hindi, Tamil, Malayalam and Kannada. The Telugu Version was released theatrically on 7 June 2024.

=== Home media ===
The digital distribution rights of the film were acquired by Amazon Prime and Bcineet Ott, the film started streaming from 10 January 2025.

== Reception ==
Arun Chilukuri of HMTV rated the film 2.75/5 stars and stated "The film blends comedy and drama with strong performances, a compelling story, and good technical execution, making it suitable for those who enjoy new narratives." Avad Mohammad of OTT Play rated the film 2.5/5 stars and wrote “Preminchoddu is a triangular love story that gradually develops with its central conflict and narrative.”

== Controversy ==
On 11 February 2024, director Shirin Sriram lodged a complaint with Raidurgam police, Hyderabad claiming that the Baby (2023) film closely resembled his script Kanna Please (later Preminchoddu). Sriram mentioned in the complaint that Sai Rajesh had initially shown interest in producing the project but later abandoned it. Police acknowledged the complaint and initiated an investigation.
