= Kathi Mahesh =

Indian film critic and actor (died 2021)

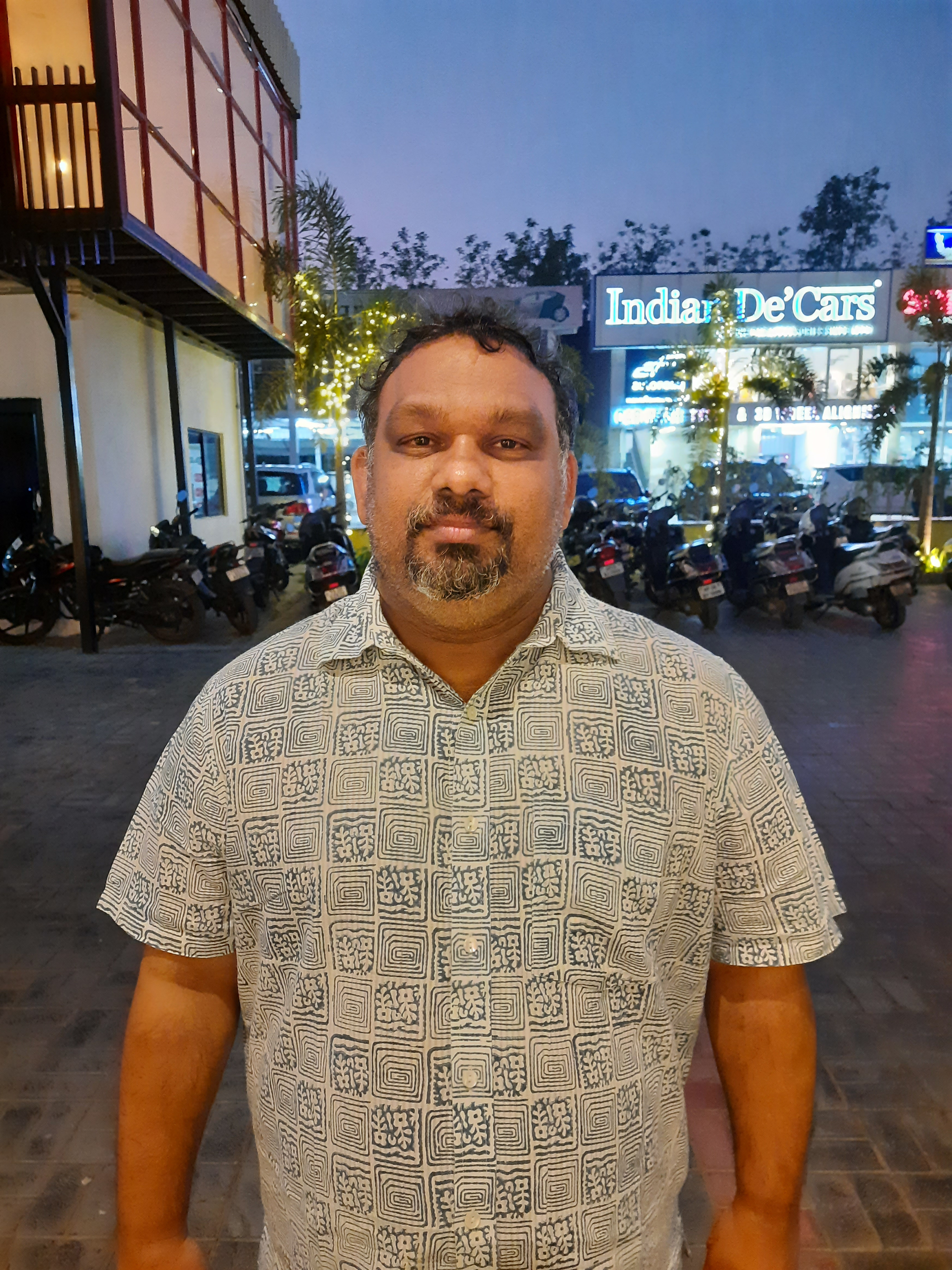
- Mahesh in 2021
- Born: Kathi Mahesh Kumar; 1977 or 1978; Chittoor district, Andhra Pradesh, India
- Died: 10 July 2021 (aged 43); Chennai, Tamil Nadu, India
- Education: Hyderabad Central University
- Occupations: Critic; actor; writer; director
- Style: Parallel cinema
- Children: 1

Kathi Mahesh Kumar (1977/78 – 10 July 2021) was an Indian film critic and actor working in Telugu cinema. He appeared on the Telugu reality TV show Bigg Boss.

== Personal life ==
Kathi Mahesh Kumar hailed from Yellamanda, a village in Chittoor district in Andhra Pradesh. He was born into a Dalit family and belonged to Madiga community. He studied at AP Residential School at Gyarampalle near Piler. He studied MA Communication at Hyderabad Central University during 1998–2000.

Mahesh was a vocal supporter of Y. S. Jagan Mohan Reddy and YSR Congress Party in the past and spoke in favour of Jagan Mohan Reddy in several television debates. He backed YSR Congress Party during the 2021 bye-elections for the Tirupati Lok Sabha constituency.

== Career ==
Mahesh started his career with Edari Varsham, based on Devarakonda Balagangadhara Tilak's story Vuri Chivara Illu. He was a co-writer of the film Minugurulu, the "first Telugu script to be preserved in the Oscar Library's permanent core collection" and the first Telugu film to contend for the Academy Awards' best feature film (2014).

In his next film, the 2015 romantic comedy Pesarattu, he used flowcam technology popularized by Ram Gopal Varma. It was the first crowd funded short film in Telugu. He played minor roles in the Telugu movies Hrudaya Kaleyam (2014), Kiss Kiss Bang Bang (2017), and Kobbari Matta (2019).

In 2017, he appeared in season 1 of the Telugu reality show Bigg Boss, hosted by Jr. NTR and telecast on Star Maa.

His last film, Egise Tarajuvvualu, touched on the need for developing scientific temperament among children.

=== Criticism on Telugu films ===
Mahesh rose to prominence for his sharp and controversial reviews on Telugu films. He had been a panelist on television news channels, often defending rationalist views. He accuses Tollywood of being casteist and feels that Telugu films lack new ideas and fail to address social issues.

In March 2017, he critically reviewed Pawan Kalyan's movie, Katamarayudu, and called the movie "a badly written film" with "a predictable screenplay". He also said that the movie was sexist and has a lot of derogatory comments against women. Soon after, he was trolled online and cyberbullied with abuses and threats on his Facebook wall, allegedly by Pawan Kalyan's fans.

== Other works ==
Mahesh worked with UNICEF, World Bank, Save the Children and the Clinton Foundation.

== Legal issues ==
Mahesh was banned from entering Hyderabad on 9 July 2018 for a period of six months by the Telangana police, under the Telangana Prevention of Anti-Social and Hazardous Activities Act, 1980, for allegedly calling Rama a "cheat" and claiming that Sita would have been better off with Ravana, during a debate, about a sedition case filed against Babu Gogineni, in a regional news channel. He was dropped at his native place in Chittoor district by the police. He defended his comments citing his right to freedom of speech.

A case was filed against him in February 2020 for referring to Rama as having mistresses and Sita wishing to eat the golden deer Rama was chasing, during an anti-CAA event held in Osmania University, Hyderabad.

== Death ==
On 25 June 2021, Mahesh met with an accident when his car collided with a truck near Nellore, when he was travelling from Chittoor towards Hyderabad. He was admitted to Medicover Hospitals in Nellore with severe head and eye injuries. The hospital stated that his health was in critical condition and then he was shifted to the ICU. The government of Andhra Pradesh offered a financial support of ₹17 lakhs from the Chief Minister's Relief Fund for his treatment. He was shifted to Apollo Hospitals in Chennai for better treatment. He died on 10 July at the age of 43. He was survived by his wife and a son. His last rites were performed on 12 July at his native village of Yellamanda.

== Filmography ==
=== Films ===
==== As actor ====
Year	Film	Role	Ref.
2011	Edari Varsham		
2014	Hrudaya Kaleyam	Policeman	
2014	Maine Pyar Kiya	Junky	
2017	Nene Raju Nene Mantri	Tea vendor	
2017	Kiss Kiss Bang Bang		
2019	Kobbari Matta	Farmer	
2019	Amma Rajyam Lo Kadapa Biddalu	Special Officer	
2021	Krack	Kathi	
2021	Nepotism		
2021	A1 Express	News reporter	

==== Other roles ====
Year	Title	Credited as	Notes
Year	Title	Role	Notes
2014	Minugurulu	Co-writer	
2015	Pesaratu	Director	
2017	Egise Taarajuvvalu	Co-writer	

=== Television ===
Year	Show	Role	Channel	Result
2017	Bigg Boss (Telugu season 1)	Contestant	Star Maa	12th place - evicted on day 27

=== Dubbing artist ===
- Lakshmi (2018; Telugu version) for Sam Paul
