= Anne Ravi =

Indian film producer

- Born: Anne Ravi
- Occupation: Film producer
- Years active: 2008-present

Anne Ravi is an Indian film producer. Started his career as an executive producer with films like Souryam, Amaravathi, and Wanted.

== Career ==
Ravi Started his career as an executive producer with Bhavya Creations. In year 2013, Anne Ravi produced a movie Race.

== Filmography ==
Year	Title	Producer	Ref.
2008	Souryam	Executive	
2009	Amavarathi	Executive	
2011	Wanted	Executive	
2012	Neeku Naaku Dash Dash	Executive	
2013	Race	Yes	
2014	Loukyam	Executive	
2017	Shamantakamani	Executive	
2017	Paisa Vasool	Executive	
2020	O Pitta Katha	Executive	
2020	Middle Class Melodies	Executive	
2021	Check	Executive	
