= ABCD: American Born Confused Desi (2019 film) =

2019 film directed by Sanjeev Reddy

- Theatrical release poster
- Directed by: Sanjeev Reddy
- Based on: ABCD: American-Born Confused Desi by Martin Prakkat
- Produced by: Madhura Sreedhar Reddy; Yash Rangineni
- Starring: Allu Sirish; Rukshar Dhillon
- Cinematography: Raam Reddy
- Edited by: Naveen Nooli
- Music by: Judah Sandhy
- Production company: Madhura Entertainment
- Distributed by: Big Ben Cinemas
- Release date: 17 May 2019
- Running time: 145 minutes
- Country: India
- Language: Telugu

ABCD: American Born Confused Desi is an Indian Telugu-language comedy drama film directed by Sanjeev Reddy and produced by Madhura Sreedhar Reddy. The film stars Allu Sirish and Rukshar Dhillon. The phrase American-born confused desi describes Indians born in America, who have difficulty in balancing their ethnic culture within the majority non-Indian American culture. The film is a remake of the Malayalam film of the same name starring Dulquer Salmaan and was released on 17 May 2019 to mixed reviews.

== Plot ==
The story revolves around two spoiled youngsters, Aravind and his cousin Bhasha. Avi is the son of a millionaire who is settled in New York, while Bhasha's mother left for Paris with her new husband. Aravind and Bhasha enjoy their luxurious life by driving expensive cars, going to pubs, etc. Avi's father decides to send them to India, telling them it is a vacation, but then blocks their credit cards, forcing them to live in poverty in Andhra Pradesh, where they eventually become famous. Aravind and Bhasha try to stay at a hotel, unaware that their credit cards have been blocked, but are soon aware of this fact and try to escape from the hotel to avoid paying. However, they are caught by the hotel manager, who confiscates their visas until they are able to pay. Avi and Bhasha are given very poor accommodations by Avi's father. They try to make money by trading fake bills but are duped.

Both Avi and Bhasha join a college to finish their MBA (which was forced to do by Avi's father). Later in the college, he meets Neha and Avi falls in love with her. After a series of events, Neha too reciprocates her feelings towards Avi. Aravind inadvertently becomes a candidate for the Mr. Fame award, and realizes that he can return to America by winning the award and receiving the prize money (500,000 rupees). Bhasha and Avi participate in a protest to increase their popularity, but the event ends up in police lathi charge. Although the event increases the popularity of Aravind and Bhasha, it also draws the attention of Bhargav, another Mr. Fame candidate and the son of a minister, who tries to break up the protest through violent means. Amidst the violence, Aravind is finally able to understand and sympathize with the struggles that people born into poverty experience. Avi wins the Mr. Fame award, but confesses the motives behind his actions onstage. Aravind chooses to stay in India and complete his degree.

== Cast ==
- Allu Sirish as Aravind Prasad ''Avi''
- Rukshar Dhillon as Neha
- Raja Chembolu as Lanka Barghav
- Nagendra Babu as Aravind's father
- Kalyani Natarajan as Aravind's mother
- Vennela Kishore as Kishore
- Master Bharath as Bala Shanmugam "Bhasha"
- Kota Srinivasa Rao as Koteswara
- Subhalekha Sudhakar as Barghav's father
- Dammu Devena as Devena
- Viva Harsha as Santosh
- Samba as News Reader
- Appaji Ambarisha Darbha as Principal

== Soundtrack ==
ABCD – American Born Confused Desi

Soundtrack album by Judah Sandhy
- Released: 11 May 2019
- Studio: Sathya Studios
- Genre: Feature film soundtrack
- Length: 17:40
- Label: Madhura Audio
External audio
- Audio Jukebox on YouTube

The soundtrack of the film was composed by Judah Sandhy and lyrics by Bhaskarabhatla, Krishna Kanth and Tirupathi Jaavana.

Track listing
No.	Title	Lyrics	Singer(s)	Length
1.	"Mella Mellaga"	Krishna Kanth	Sid Sriram, Aditi Bhavaraju	4:02
2.	"Muntha Kallu"	Tirupathi Jaavana	Tirupathi Jaavana	3:39
3.	"America Naa America"	Bhaskarabhatla	Benny Dayal, Sanjith Hegde	3:17
4.	"Celebrity"	Bhaskarabhatla	Rahul Sipligunj	3:32
5.	"ABCD"	Judah Sandhy	Judah Sandhy	3:10
Total length:				17:40

== Release and marketing ==
The film was theatrically released on 17 May 2019. The film was also dubbed in Hindi and directly premiered by Goldmines Telefilms on Dhinchaak in early 2021.

== Critical reception ==
Murali Krishna C. H. of The New Indian Express rated the film 3/5 and wrote, "ABCD doesn’t quite hit the mark, it’s due to lack of emotional depth, slow pace and conflict that never rings true. [...] Director Sanjeev Reddy seems to have meted out unfair treatment to an interesting story that has great scope to play on humour and emotions." Neeshita Nyayapati of The Times of India gave it 2.5/5 stars and wrote, "If you’re looking for something that’s emotional, dramatic or even consistently funny, this is not the film for you. But if you’re looking for a light-hearted entertainer [...] Go watch this one with no expectations, you'll end up enjoying it!" A critic from The Hans India gave it 2.5/5 and wrote, "Though some of the scenes are same as the original version, the director has succeeded in including fresh comedy in the film."

Suresh Kavirayani of Deccan Chronicle wrote, "ABCD is not a good remake. Except for Vennela Kishore, the film offers nothing. Though it’s a good plot it is badly handled and ends like a dull drama." Hemanth Kumar C. R. of Firstpost wrote, "By the time ABCD ends, there’s a sense of relief - at least it didn’t turn out to be an unbearable film. It’s predictable, devoid of any strong emotional moments, and the sloppy writing makes it a boring watch." Manoj Kumar R. of The Indian Express gave it 1/5 stars and wrote, "It puzzles me when I think why would the filmmakers expect the audience to waste their hard-earned money to see a rich brat learn his lesson on poverty and how to live on a tight budget?"
