= Vaishnavi Chaitanya =

Indian Telugu actress

- Chaitanya in 2023
- Born: 4 January 2001 (age 25); Hyderabad, Andhra Pradesh, India
- Occupation: Actress
- Years active: 2018–present

Vaishnavi Chaitanya is an Indian actress who appears in Telugu films. She is best known for her role in the drama series The Software Devloveper (2020) and the film Baby (2023) for which she won Filmfare Critics Award for Best Actress – Telugu and SIIMA Award for Best Female Debut – Telugu.

== Early life ==
Vaishnavi Chaitanya was born in Telugu family in Chandrayangutta in Old City of Hyderabad, Telangana.

== Filmography ==
Key
†	Denotes films that have not yet been released

=== Films ===
Year	Title	Role	Notes	Ref.
2018	Touch Chesi Chudu	Kartikeya's younger sister	Debut film	
2018	Ee Maaya Peremito	Alekhya		
2020	Ala Vaikunthapurramuloo	Sailaja		
2021	Rang De	Arjun's brother-in-law's love interest		
2021	Tuck Jagadish	Neelaveni		
2021	Varudu Kaavalenu	Bindu		
2022	Valimai	Ramya	Tamil film	
2023	Premadesam	Maya's sister		
2023	Baby	Vaishnavi "Vaishu"	Debut as lead	
2024	Love Me	Priya		
2025	Jack	Detective Afshaana / Bhanumathi		
2026	Epic	Kadali		

=== Television ===
Year	Title	Role	Ref.
2019	Love in 143 Hours	Lasya	
2020	The Software Devloveper	Vaishnavi	
2021	Arere Manasa	Sindhu	
2021	Missamma	Mahalakshmi	

== Awards ==
- Best Performer Award 2020–Female (YouTube) at 10th Padmamohana TV Awards 2020.
- Best Debut Actress at 22nd Santosham Film Awards for Baby.
- Filmfare Critics Award for Best Actress – Telugu at 69th Filmfare Awards South for Baby.
- SIIMA Award for Best Female Debut – Telugu at 12th South Indian International Movie Awards for Baby.
