= Aha Naa Pellanta (TV series) =

2022 Indian romantic comedy drama series

- Genre: Romantic comedy Drama
- Created by: Sheik Dawood G. Tamada Media
- Written by: Kalyan Raghav Pasapula
- Screenplay by: Sheik Dawood G.
- Directed by: Sanjeev Reddy
- Starring: Raj Tarun; Shivani Rajashekar; Harsha Vardhan; Aamani; Posani Krishna Murali; Mohammad Ali Baig; Madhunandan; Raghu Karumanchi
- Music by: Judah Sandhy
- Country of origin: India
- Original language: Telugu
- No. of seasons: 1

Production
- Producers: Rahul Tamada; Saideep Reddy Borra
- Cinematography: Nagesh Banell; Ashkar Ali
- Editor: Madhu Reddy
- Production company: Tamada Media

Original release
- Network: ZEE5
- Release: November 17, 2022

Aha Naa Pellanta is a 2022 Indian Telugu-language streaming television series directed by Sanjeev Reddy and produced by Surya Rahul Tamada under the Tamada Media banner. It stars Raj Tarun and Shivani Rajashekhar in lead roles, while Aamani, Harsha Vardhan, and Getup Srinu in supporting roles. Set in the backdrop of Rajamundry, the series is a comical narrative of a groom, isolated by the bride on their wedding day. The series was released on ZEE5 on 17 November 2022.

== Plot ==
This eight-episode series centres on a bride who escapes with her ex-boyfriend and leaves the groom waiting in the mandap. The story unfolds when this guy decides to take revenge. The series is a humorous take on revenge and an irrational oath which changes the protagonist's fate forever.

== Cast ==
- Raj Tarun as Seenu
- Shivani Rajashekar as Maha
- Harsha Vardhan as No Ball Narayana, Seenu's father
- Aamani as Susheela, Seenu's mother
- Posani Krishna Murali as Mahendra, Sudha's father
- Mohammad Ali Baig as Mr. K, terrorist
- Vadlamani Srinivas as Praveen Kumar, Maha's father
- Raghu Karumanchi as C.I
- Madhunandan as Vasanth, Maha's ex-fiance and Anu's husband
- Dipali Sharma as Sudha, Seenu's ex-fiance
- Hanu Reddy as Maha's brother and Sudha's husband
- Kritika Singh as Sreeja, Seenu's childhood friend
- Thagubothu Ramesh as Barber Diwakar
- Getup Srinu as Neighbour Seenu
- Badram as Broker Perayya
- Rajkumar Kasireddy as Donga Gopal
- Ravi Siva Teja as Das, Seenu's bestfriend
- Trishool Jeethuri as Bala, Seenu's bestfriend
- Dorababu as Murali
- Warangal Vandana as Anu, Maha's bestfriend
- Rajsekhar Aningi as Sreeja's father
- Rakesh Rachakonda as Village Friend

== Release ==
In early 2022, ZEE5 announced a slate of Telugu series and films, with Aha Naa Pellanta being one of them, scheduled for a release on 17 November 2022.

The makers unveiled the first look teaser through social media platforms on 31 October 2022 and an official trailer on 4 November 2022 which begins with the introduction of Srinu’s (Raj Tarun) family. As Srinu agrees for marriage, his parents (played by Harsha Vardhan and Amani) fix the match with a girl in the same town. Later, on the wedding day, the bride escapes with her boyfriend.

The title track for Aha Naa Pellanta was released on 5 November 2022.

=== Home media ===
The streaming rights for Aha Naa Pellanta were acquired by ZEE5.
