= Maataraani Mounamidhi =

Telugu film by Suku Poorvaj

- Theatrical release poster
- Directed by: Suku Purvaj/Poorvaaj
- Screenplay by: Suku Purvaj/Poorvaaj
- Story by: Suku Purvaj/Poorvaaj
- Produced by: Vasudev Rajapanthula; Prabhakar
- Starring: Mahesh Datta, Soni Srivasthava, Archana Ananth
- Cinematography: Shivaram Charan
- Edited by: Shiva Sarvani
- Music by: Ashirvad
- Production company: Rudra Creations
- Release date: 19 August 2022
- Country: India
- Language: Telugu

Maataraani Mounamidhi is a Telugu-language horror film, directed by Suku Purvaj/Poorvaaj, and produced by Vasudev Rajapanthula and Prabhakar under the banner of Rudra Creations. The film stars Archana Ananth, Mahesh Datta, Sonu Srivastava in the lead roles, with a supporting cast, Suman Setty, Srihari Udayagirl and others

== Plot ==
The story follows Ram, whose visit to his nephew Eswar's house unexpectedly turns into a nightmarish ordeal, which none ever witnessed or experienced

== Cast ==
- Mahesh Datta
- Soni Srivasthava
- Archana Ananth
- Suman Setty
- Srihari Udayagiri
- Kaamraju
- Jaspreet Kaur as Item Dancer Dhalakshmi

== Production ==
The film is produced by Vasudev Rajapantula and Prabhakar D under the banner of Rudra Creations, Shivaram Charan handles the cinematography, Shiva Sarvani handled the editing section, and Ashirvad scored music for the film

== Soundtrack ==
The film contains 2 songs, where Vasudev and Basha penned the lyrics for the songs, and the audio rights were bagged by Madhura Audio

Track Listing
No.	Title	Lyrics	Singer(s)	Length
1.	"Ee Rojedhoo"	Vasudev	Ashique Ali, Sony Komanduri	5:01
2.	"Dhampudu Lakshmi"	Basha	L. V. Revanth, Maneesha Padranki, Yuvarahul Kanaparthi	4:59
Total length:				10:03

== Release ==
Theatrical

Maataraani Mounamidhi was released on 19 August 2022

Home Media

Maataraani Mounamidhi was streaming on Aha Video

== Reception ==
Overall, this film received 2.75 out of 5 stars
