= Login (film) =

- Theatrical poster
- Directed by: Sanjeev Reddy
- Written by: Sanjeev Reddy
- Produced by: Sanjeev Reddy; Raj Kumar Ponugupati
- Starring: Himanshu Bhatt; Radhika Roy; Akkash Basnet; Rashmi Gautam; Nandini Rai; KK Binojee; Siddarth Chopra
- Cinematography: Y. N. Naveen Kumar
- Edited by: Naveen Nooli
- Music by: Sunil Kashyap
- Production company: Cocktail Pictures
- Release date: 12 October 2012
- Running time: 125 minutes
- Country: India
- Language: Hindi

Login is a 2012 Indian Hindi-language suspense thriller film directed by Sanjeev Reddy. The project is produced by Cocktail Pictures, and stars Himanshu Bhatt, Radhika Roy, Akkash Basnet, Rashmi Gautam, Nandini Rai, Siddarth Chopra, KK Binojee. The soundtrack is composed by Sunil Kashyap along with lyrics by KK Binojee. Login was released on 12 October 2012.

== Plot ==
Login is a Hindi feature film about three different individuals and how the Internet and social networking sites changed their lives. True to its caption – "Connected online but disconnected in life" – the film portrays how everyone is glued to the Internet and hence getting away from their true selves.

Jai is a young office worker who seeks a girlfriend through online dating sites. Vandana is a housewife who spends her free time chatting on social networking sites. Debu is a call centre worker who uses the Net to make money. How the usage of the Internet had affected the lives of these three characters forms the crux of the story.

== Cast ==
- Himanshu Bhatt as Mrityunjay Viswa karma
- Radhika Roy as Vandana
- Akkash Basnet as Debasish Mondal
- Rashmi Gautam as Vrutika
- Nandini Rai as Divya
- KK Binojee as Vishaal
- Siddharth Chopra as Johnny
- Pavani Reddy as Seema

== Critical reception ==
Login was rated 3 stars by The Times of India.

== Remakes ==
Login was remade into Telugu as Ladies & Gentlemen, which was well received by both the audience and critics.
