= Mugulu Nage =

- Theatrical release poster
- Directed by: Yogaraj Bhat
- Written by: Yogaraj Bhat
- Produced by: Syed Salam; Ganesh; Yogaraj Bhat
- Starring: Ganesh; Apoorva Arora; Achyuth Kumar; Nikitha Narayan; Ashika Ranganath
- Cinematography: Sugnaan
- Edited by: Suresh Arumugam
- Music by: V. Harikrishna
- Production companies: S. S. Films; Golden Movies; Yogaraj Cinemas
- Distributed by: Mysuru Talkies
- Release date: 1 September 2017
- Country: India
- Language: Kannada

Mugulu Nage ( transl. Smile) is a 2017 Indian Kannada-language romantic comedy film directed by Yogaraj Bhat, and jointly produced by Ganesh and Syed Salaam. The film stars Ganesh in the lead role alongside Ashika Ranganath, Apoorva Arora and Nikitha Narayan. The soundtrack and score is by V. Harikrishna, the cinematography is by Sugnan. The first look of the film was released on 14 February 2017 coinciding the Valentine's Day.

The project marked the third collaboration of Bhat and Ganesh after Mungaru Male (2006) and Gaalipata (2008). The filming began on 8 December 2016 in Bengaluru. Further, shooting took place in Pondicherry, Mysuru, Yaana and Sirsi, Karnataka.

== Plot ==
Pulakeshi is born with a strange problem of always smiling and not able to cry at all. He meets Vaishali on the day of his college's 50th-year celebration and alumni reunion. Both of them fall in love eventually. Vaishali persuades Pulakeshi to study abroad with her and make a better life for both of them. Pulakeshi agrees and on the day of departure, he realizes his strong love for his family and stays back. Heartbroken, Vaishali leaves alone.

Later, Pulakeshi finds Siri, a guitarist, from Pondicherry. They share common interests and develop a liking for each other. After realising the strong feelings for each other, Pulakeshi asks Siri to marry him. Siri likes living in the moment and rejects the proposal. Having a difference of opinion, they decide to part ways for good. Siri tells him if Pulakeshi dreams of having a family, he may marry any girl of his choice and that she would live the rest of her life with sweet memories of him. Heartbroken, but still not able to shed tears, Pulakeshi starts his life afresh in Bangalore.

Two years later, his mother finds him a girl and asks his friends to take him to her place. As soon as Pulakeshi sees her, he likes her. The girl named Charulatha is hardworking and lives in coastal Karnataka. Her father is a cancer patient and mother has already expired. Her sister's marriage is fixed with the son of her father's friend who also has cancer. When Charulatha's sister elopes with her colleague to escape from unwanted marriage, she sacrifices her love and marries her would-be brother-in-law. Heartbroken once again, Pulakeshi finally sheds tears and cries.

At the end, it is shown that Pulakeshi is married to Amulya and becomes a father to a boy. All his three ex-girlfriends receive this message. Siri genuinely feels happy for him, while Charulatha has mixed reactions.

== Cast ==
- Ganesh as Pulakeshi
- Ashika Ranganath as Vaishali
- Nikitha Narayan as Siri
- Apoorva Arora as Charulatha
- Achyuth Kumar as Pulakeshi's father
- Ananth Nag as Dr. Anant
- Rangayana Raghu as Raghu, Charulatha's father
- Chandan Achar as Pulakeshi's friend
- Niharika
- Dharmanna Kadur as Gopi, Pulakeshi's friend
- Manjunath Hegde as Charulatha's foster father
- Srinivas Prabhu as M. Srinivas, a college Principal
- Rekha Mohan as a musician
- Jaggesh in a cameo as singer
- Amulya in a cameo as Pulakeshi's wife
- Nitesh Nittur in a cameo as the man in the restaurant
- Sunetra Pandit in a cameo as lady in restaurant

== Production ==
=== Filming ===
In August 2016, it was reported that the successful combination of Yogaraj Bhat and Ganesh are teaming up together again for a new romantic venture. While Bhat was taking care of the script, wrote story and take up the direction, Ganesh was cast as the lead actor apart from co-producing the film and V. Harikrishna was chosen to compose the music. On 30 November 2016, the film was reported to have titled as Mugulu Nage. On 8 December 2016, the filming began with the first schedule officially canned at ISRO Layout in Bengaluru. The second schedule was held at Mysuru followed by the third schedule being shot in Puducherry. It was also reported that team expected the filming would be completed by the end of February 2017. However, the shooting was officially concluded in April 2017.

=== Casting ===
Ganesh (right) and Bhat (left) during the filming in Pondicherry

After signing Ganesh for the lead role, actress Amulya was signed in for one of the female leads. It was also reported that the film would feature three more leading female characters, with a total of four different romantic tracks. Actresses Nabha Natesh and Nikitha Narayan were approached to play the other lead roles. However, later Nabha was replaced by model turned actress Ashika Ranganath, playing her first role for a film. Apart from these leading actresses. In February 2017, it was announced that actor Jaggesh would be appearing in a special song sequence penned by Bhat himself. Later in March 2017, Bhat made some last-minute changes by replacing Amulya with actress Apoorva Arora since Amulya got engaged and her marriage dates were clashing with the film schedule. Apoorva joined the team on 18 March and shot her scenes at Barkur. It was also reported that Amulya would still make a guest appearance in the film.

== Soundtrack ==
Mugulu Nage

Soundtrack album by V. Harikrishna
- Released: 11 July 2017
- Recorded: 2017
- Genre: Feature film soundtrack
- Length: 30:00
- Label: D Beats
- Producer: V. Harikrishna

V. Harikrishna chronology
| Raajakumara (2017) | Mugulu Nage (2017) | Bharjari (2017) |

V. Harikrishna scored the film's background and for its soundtrack. The soundtrack, consisting of six tracks, was released starting with the track "Hodi Ombattu" on 11 July 2017 in Hubli and each song in a different city of Karnataka subsequently on every alternate day to "honour each of Harikrishna's songs", who scored for his 100th film. The distribution rights procured by D Beats. The lyrics were written by Yogaraj Bhat and Jayanth Kaikini.

Track list
| No. | Title | Lyrics | Singer(s) | Length |
|---|---|---|---|---|
| 1. | "Ninna Snehadinda" | Yogaraj Bhat | Shreya Ghoshal | 4:07 |
| 2. | "Amara Hale Nenapu" | Yogaraj Bhat | Vijay Prakash | 4:32 |
| 3. | "Roopasi Summane" | Jayanth Kaikini | Sonu Nigam | 4:17 |
| 4. | "Hodi Ombath" | Yogaraj Bhat | Vijay Prakash | 4:30 |
| 5. | "Kere Yeri" | Yogaraj Bhat | Sonu Nigam | 4:40 |
| 6. | "Mugulu Nage" | Yogaraj Bhat | Sonu Nigam | 4:15 |
| 7. | "Kannadi Illada Orinali" | Jayanth Kaikini | Shreya Ghoshal | 4:19 |
| Total length: | | | | 30:00 |

== Reception ==
=== Critical response ===
A critic from The New Indian Express wrote that "Mugulu Nage is a film that touches the heart. Yogaraj Bhat and Ganesh found a way to capture love and heartbreak in Mungaru Male through rains, and this time the two seem to have matured in their outlook on romance. This time the two tell us that love can be navigated with a smile and only Ganesh complements Bhat’s efforts". A critic from The Times of India wrote that "Yogaraj and Ganesh first got together to make a film about heartbreak. With Mugulu Nage, the combination has grown and learnt to move on, which in many ways is quite akin to the film itself".

On the contrary, a critic from Deccan Chronicle wrote that "Both Yogaraj and Ganesh reunite after a decade to recreate their magic but it turns out to an ordinary venture with mixed feelings. While some part of the film looks refreshing and is emotionally packed with a reason to smile, the remainder is dragged on with the director’s usual tidbit formula". A critic from Bangalore Mirror wrote that "Mugulu Nage is good enough to drag people to the theatres, but does it give the immersive experience to keep off gadgets altogether?" A critic from The Hindu wrote that "‘Mugulu Nage’ is not great as a whole but is at least good in parts which are not what you could say about many of Bhat’s efforts".
