= Madamakki =

- Theatrical release poster
- Directed by: Vinay Preetham
- Screenplay by: Vinay Preetham
- Story by: Vinay Preetham
- Produced by: Shivanna Dasanapura
- Starring: Tanush Shivanna; Nikitha Narayan; Saikumar; Tara; Deepika Kamaiah
- Cinematography: Kiran Hampapur
- Edited by: K M Prakash
- Music by: Anoop Seelin
- Production company: Sri Rama Talkies
- Distributed by: Mysore Talkies
- Release date: 19 August 2016 (India)
- Running time: 110 minutes
- Country: India
- Language: Kannada

Madamakki is a 2016 Indian Kannada film directed by Vinay Preetham starring Tanush Shivanna and Nikitha Narayan in the lead roles. The supporting cast features Saikumar, Tara, Deepika Kamaiah. The music is scored by Anoop Seelin and cinematography is by Kiran Hampapur. The film was released on 19 August 2016 across Karnataka.

== Cast ==
- Tanush Shivanna as Sadhu
- Nikitha Narayan
- Saikumar as Shivashankar
- Tara
- Deepika Kamaiah
- Rajendra Karanth
- Kari Subbu
- Muniraj
- Sandeep
- Vishal

== Reception ==
Sunayana Suresh of The Times of India rated the film three out of five stars and wrote, "The film would have worked better had it not been for some extra theatrics and dialogues being added to Saikumar and Tanush's characters and the film had remained a subtle, yet effective, thriller." Shashiprasad SM of Deccan Chronicle wrote, "A couple of fight sequences are ok. With the climax fast approaching, the film gathers pace and the Madamakki too starts making some sense.An honest effort which could have been better."
