= Godava =

2007 film directed by A. Kodandarami Reddy

- Theatrical Release poster
- Directed by: A. Kodandarami Reddy
- Written by: Paruchuri Brothers (dialogues)
- Screenplay by: A. Kodandarami Reddy
- Produced by: A. Kodandarami Reddy; A. Bharati; A. Sunil Reddy (presenter)
- Starring: Vaibhav; Shraddha Arya
- Cinematography: Dinesh
- Edited by: Marthand K. Venkatesh
- Music by: Mani Sharma
- Production company: K Films
- Release date: 7 December 2007
- Running time: 146 minutes
- Country: India
- Language: Telugu

Godava (transl. Trouble) is a 2007 Telugu-language film directed by A. Kodandarami Reddy and stars his son Vaibhav and Shraddha Arya in the lead roles alongside Sayaji Shinde who plays a supporting role. This film marks the film debut of Reddy and the Telugu film debut of Arya.

== Plot ==
To avoid marriage, Anjali gets into a fake relationship with her collegemate Balu.

== Cast ==
- Vaibhav as Balu
- Shraddha Arya as Anjali
- Sayaji Shinde as Anjali's father
- Chalapathi Rao as Balu's father
- Delhi Rajeshwari as Balu's mother
- Annapoorna as Anjali's grandmother
- Brahmanandam as College Principal
- Sunil as Train Ticket Collector
- Ashwini as Anjali's friend
- Chitram Srinu as Balu's friend
- Babloo as Balu's friend
- AVS as Temple Priest
- Venu Madhav
- Jaya Prakash Reddy as Anjali's grandfather
- Raghu Babu as Police Sub-Inspector
- M. S. Narayana as Train Passenger
- Raghunatha Reddy as Superintendent of Police
- Gundu Sudarshan as Porter
- Dhanraj as Balu's friend
- Venu Yeldandi as College Student
- Thagubothu Ramesh
- Uttej as Lawyer
- Shankar Melkote as Suzy's father
- Nagendra Babu as the Chief Guest for Youth Festival (cameo appearance)
- Zabyn Khan as an item number in "Current Kastha"
- Balu Charan as Balu's friend

== Production ==
Due to the fact that the lead actor's real name, Sumanth, was already the name of an established actor, Kodandarami Reddy asked Chiranjeevi to pick a name from a list of ten names that Reddy had selected for his son. Chiranjeevi picked out the name Vaibhav from the list to be Sumanth Reddy's stage name. The filming was completed in September 2007.

== Soundtrack ==
Soundtrack was composed by Mani Sharma. The audio was launched on 10 September 2007. The songs were shot Bangkok, Malaysia and Visakhapatnam. Balakrishna attended the audio launch as a chief guest.

- "Evaro Nuvva" - Ranjith, Kalyani
- "Current Kastha" - Rita
- "Mounamlo" - N. C. Karunya
- "Okkasaari" - Rahul, Sunitha
- "Hutch Phone" - KK, Deepa, Kousalya

== Release and reception ==
The film was released on 7 December along with Sivaji-starrer State Rowdy. The film was released with 31 prints. The film released to negative reviews. Rediff gave the film a rating of one out of five stars and noted that "The motive behind such films is nothing but an excuse to showcase the wannabe star's dancing prowess and action shots". This film was later dubbed in Hindi as Rowdy Bodyguard: A Powerful Man (2014).
