= Gurukula Pathasala =

Gurukula Patasala also Andhra Pradesh Residential School is a boarding school run by the Government of Andhra Pradesh. The students live amongst their peers from 5th grade to 10th grade. In Gurukulas students learn in traditional way like the way in which pandits studied in ashrams. They are rich in heritage.

The school's performance is among the best in the state with over 98% pass percentage in SSC exams in 2013 with over 144 schools securing 100%.

== List of schools ==
- Gurukula Pathasala, Gparahanabegumarikapadu
- Saangika Sankshema Gurukula Pathasala, Ibrahimpatnam
- Gurukula Pathasala, Shadnagar
- Gurukula Pathasala, Thanelanka, Amalapuram
- Gurukula Pathasala, Gorantla
- Gurukula Pathasala, Machilipatnam
- Gurukula Pathasala, Vaddemanu, Kadapa
- Andhra Pradesh Residential School, Sarvail
- Andhra Pradesh Residential School, Kodigenahalli
- Sangika Sankshema Gurukula Pathasala, Manchiral
- Andhra Pradesh Residential School, Nagarjuna Sagar
