= Sanjeev Reddy =

Indian film director, producer, screenwriter

- Occupations: Film director; producer; screenwriter
- Years active: 2007–present

Sanjeev Reddy is an Indian film director, producer and screenwriter.

== Career ==
Sanjeev Reddy made his directional debut with Login, which is based on cybercrimes and its effects on netizens. The Times of India in its review wrote: "Reddy's storytelling is interesting." The film was remade in Telugu as Ladies & Gentlemen.

In 2019, Reddy has directed his first Telugu feature film ABCD: American Born Confused Desi with Allu Sirish and Rukshar Dhillon as its leads.

== Filmography ==
List of Sanjeev Reddy film credits
Year	Title	Credited as	Language	Notes
2012	Login	Director, producer, writer	Hindi	
2019	ABCD – American Born Confused Desi	Director	Telugu	
2022	Aha Naa Pellanta	Director	Telugu	Zee5 series
