= Nikitha Narayan =

Indian actress and model

- Education: Bachelors in Management Studies B.M.S from St. Francis College, Begumpet, Hyderabad
- Occupations: Model, Actress

Nikitha Narayan is an Indian actress and model. Working as a model since the age of 10, she entered the Telugu film industry in 2011 after participating and winning beauty pageants.

== Early life and family ==
She graduated in Bachelor of Management Studies from the St. Francis College, Begumpet, Hyderabad. She interned as a Business Analyst at Goldman sachs Bangalore and later got placed in the Facebook company. After her first film, she worked for Amazon.com.

== Career ==
=== Modelling ===
Nikitha's modeling career began at the age of 10, when she worked with noted director Rajiv Menon on a television advertisement for Annapurna Iodised salt. It was followed by ads for Fair & Lovely and other brands over the next few years. In 2009 she won the Dabur Miss Fresh Face of Hyderabad, after which she participated at the 2010 Miss South India contest, earning the second runner-up title along with a host of sub-titles (Miss Congeniality and Miss Beautiful Skin). She next represented the Southern region alongside three other models at the Miss Queen of India 2011. She finished under the Top 5 and won the Miss Beautiful Eyes title.

Nikitha has also walked the ramp in many fashion shows and designer week, and has modeled for brands in various categories including jewelry and clothing.

=== Acting ===
In November 2011, Nikitha entered the film industry when she won the lead role in the Telugu film It's My Love Story directed by Madhura Sreedhar Reddy. The film ran successfully for over 50 days across Andhra Pradesh and she received good reviews for her performance. The Hindu wrote that she "makes a sparkling debut" and Rediff wrote that she "looks fresh and has the potential to grow into an actor". She was nominated in the Best Female Debutant category at the 1st South Indian International Movie Awards held in Dubai.

Later, she worked for a Telugu project titled Race under Bhavya creations banner which got released on 1 March 2013. Her next film was titled Made In Vizag. A remake of the Marathi film, Mumbai-Pune-Mumbai, it was directed by Kanmani. Her first 2015 release was Ladies & Gentlemen directed by Manjunath, in which she was seen as a homemaker. A week later, she was seen in Pesarattu, which was the first crowd funded Telugu film.

She did a movie with the renowned yesteryear national award winning director Vamsy's Vennello Hai Hai opposite Ajmal of Ko fame.

== Filmography ==
Year	Film	Role	Language	Notes
2011	It's My Love Story	Vandana	Telugu	Nominated—SIIMA Award for Best Female Debut – Telugu
2013	Race	Anjali	Telugu	Cameo appearance
2013	Made in Vizag		Telugu	
2015	Ladies & Gentlemen	Priya	Telugu	
2015	Pesarattu	Bhavana	Telugu	
2016	Madamakki		Kannada	
2016	Vennello Hai Hai	Sathya	Telugu	
2017	Mugulu Nage	Siri	Kannada	
