= Sugriva (film) =

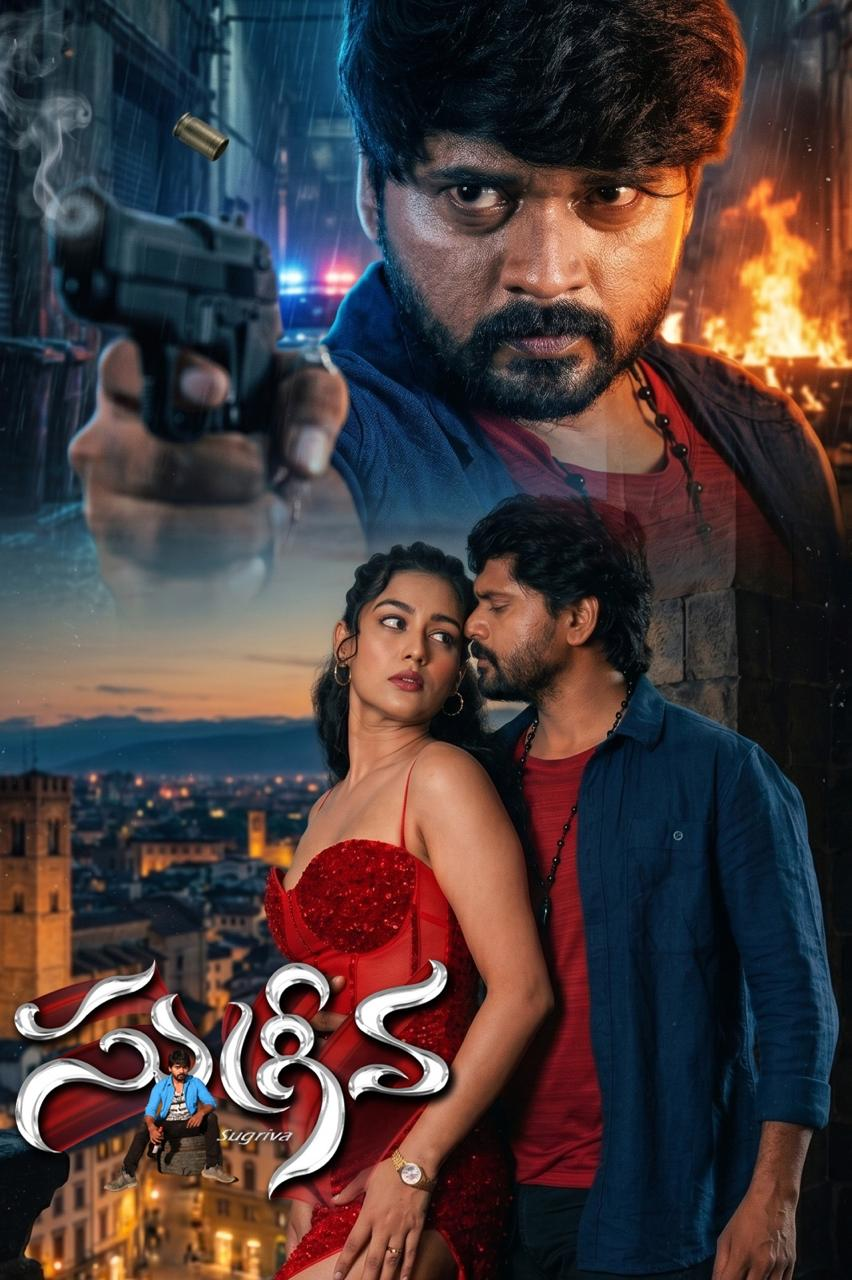
- Poster
- Directed by: Narthu Chiranjeevi
- Screenplay by: Narthu Chiranjeevi
- Produced by: M. Pavan Kumar
- Starring: Balu Charan; Kajal Tiwari; Sai Krupa; Suman Shetty
- Cinematography: Lucky Ekari
- Edited by: Bobby Kadali
- Music by: Ajay Patnaik; Navneeth Chari; Vijay Kurakula
- Production company: SGSV Movies
- Release date: 24 April 2026
- Running time: 95 minutes
- Country: India
- Language: Telugu

Sugriva is an Indian Telugu-language suspense action family entertainer directed by Narthu Chiranjeevi, and is produced by M. Pavan Kumar under the SGSV Movies. The film stars Balu Charan and Kajal Tiwari in the lead roles, alongside Sai Krupa, Suman Shetty, and RX 100 Karan Vijay.

Ajay Patnaik provided the background score, while Vijay Kurakula and Navneeth Chaari co-composed the music for the film. Lucky Ekari handled the cinematography. And Bobby Kadali edited the film.

The film released on 24 April 2026.

== Plot ==
Balu, a common man, leads a peaceful and joyous life with his wife Prashanthi and their daughter Akshara. However, when Akshara is hospitalized because of shocking accident, their life turns upside down. To save his daughter's life, Balu urgently needs to arrange 50 lakh rupees for her medical treatment. In sheer desperation, he is forced into the dark underworld, eventually becoming a pawn in the hands of a dangerous mafia syndicate. Drawing inspiration from the mythological figure Sugriva, Balu utilizes his strength and intellect to combat the criminal empire. How Balu escapes their trap and saves his family forms the rest of the story.

== Cast ==
- Balu Charan as Balu
- Kajal Tiwari as Prashanthi
- Gagana Geethika as Balu and Prashanthi's daughter
- Sai Krupa
- Suman Shetty
- Karan Vijay
- Alprui Sunil
- Vamsi Kodali

== Production ==
The filming of the movie's songs took place in picturesque locations across Goa and Visakhapatnam (Vizag). On 19 April 2026, the makers released the film's trailer.

== Soundtrack ==
The film's music is composed by Ajay Patnaik, while Vijay Kurakula and Navneeth Chari co-composed the music. The background music is specifically provided by Ajay Patnaik. The lyrics for the songs were written by Ranjith Kumar Riki.

Track Listing
No.	Title	Lyrics	Music	Singer	Length
1.	"Chiru Chiru"	Ranjith Kumar Ricky	Navneeth Chari	Harini	4:15
Total length:					4:15

== Reception ==
Upon its release, Sugriva movie received mixed reviews.

Suhas Sistu of Hans India gave the film 2.5/5, and said that while the film explored the themes with non-linear narration and philosophical undertones, the screenplay kept the audience engaged with unexpected twists.

The reviewer of Sakshi Post gave the film 2.5/5, and while the review mentioned that the technical aspects of the film are commendable, it observed such nuances as the film maintaining suspense through non-linear structure, and that even minor characters added texture to the matured themes of the movie.

Sunil Boddula of News18 gave the film 2.5/5, and mentioned that the film highlighted the heavy medical expenses that the common people find difficult to meet, and said that the father daughter emotion in movie reminded of the old Telugu movies.

Ramu Chinthakindhi of Timesnow gave the film 2.5/5, and said that the director handled the screenplay well. The reviewer also noted that Balu Charan acted well as both the responsible father and as a powerful man in a world of crime.
