= Suman Setty =

Indian actor and comedian (born 1983)

- Occupations: Actor, comedian
- Years active: 2002–present

P. Suman Setty is an Indian actor known for his comic roles. He appears in Telugu and Tamil films. He won the Nandi Award for Best Male Comedian for his role in Jayam film.

== Career ==
Suman Setty debuted in Teja's Jayam (2002). He was selected from a group of newcomers and his comedy was well received leading to offers in other films.

== Filmography ==
Key
†	Denotes films that have not yet been released

Telugu films

Year	Title	Role	Notes
2002	Jayam	Ali Baba	
2002	Dhanalakshmi, I Love You		
2003	Kabaddi Kabaddi	Priest	
2003	Vijayam	Raju's classmate	
2003	Nijam	Baddu	
2004	Naa Alludu		
2004	Love Today		
2004	Mee Intikoste Em Istaaru Maa Intkoste Em Testaaru		
2004	Xtra		
2004	7G Brindhavan Colony	Lakshmi Narayana	
2004	Konchem Touchlo Vunte Cheputanu		
2005	Dhairyam		
2005	Sankranti	Thief	
2005	Avunanna Kaadanna		
2006	Happy	Bunny's friend	
2006	Ranam	Student	
2006	Roommates	Bunty	
2006	Neeku Naaku	College student	
2006	Khatarnak	Student	
2006	Annavaram		
2007	Railway Gate		
2007	Andaala Amitabh Bachchan		
2007	Aadavari Matalaku Ardhalu Verule	Servant Mangayya	
2007	Raju Bhai		
2007	Vijayadasami		
2008	Pourudu		
2008	Highway		
2008	Idi Sangathi		
2008	Mangatayaru Tiffin Centre		
2008	Theekuchi		
2008	Bommana Brothers Chandana Sisters	Servant	
2008	Ready	Rambabu	
2008	Ullasamga Utsahamga	Ganesh	
2008	Baladur	Pappu	
2008	Andhra Andagadu		
2008	Doshi		
2008	Dongala Bandi		
2009	Pistha	Muralikrishna's friend	
2009	Rechipo		
2009	Bendu Apparao R.M.P	Compounder	
2010	Kalavar King		
2010	Buridi		
2011	Katha Screenplay Darsakatvam Appalaraju	Annamacharya	
2011	Amayakudu	Pooja's brother	
2011	Aakasame Haddu	Aravindh	
2012	Neeku Naaku Dash Dash	Toofan	
2012	Endukante... Premanta!	Kumar	
2012	Hostel Days		
2012	Mythri		
2013	Oke Okka Chance		
2013	Ee Rojullo		
2013	Sri Jagadguru Adi Shankara	Kapala Marthanda Raju	
2014	Premalo...ABC		
2015	Toll Free Number 143		
2015	Lava Kusa		
2015	Chembu Chinna Satyam		
2016	Pedarikam		
2016	Sathi Thimmamamba		
2016	Okkasari Premisthe		
2016	Ninne Korukunta		
2016	Naruda Donoruda	Koti	
2016	Sardaar Gabbar Singh	wood maker	
2017	Naku Nene Thopu Thurumu		
2017	Darre		
2019	Crazy Crazy Feeling		
2019	Rangu Paduddi		
2019	Bhagyanagara Veedullo Gamattu		
2022	Jetty		
2022	Maataraani Mounamidhi		
2023	Natho Nenu		
2025	Junior	Shopkeeper	
2026	Rich Kid		
2026	Sugriva		

Tamil films

Year	Title	Role	Notes
2003	Jayam	Ali Baba	Remake of Jayam (2002)
2004	Kuthu	Ramanathan Jr.	
2004	7/G Rainbow Colony	Lakshmi Narayanan	
2005	Mannin Maindhan	Dheena	
2005	February 14	Suman	
2005	Sandakozhi	Ilango	
2006	Kedi	Raghu's friend	
2006	Varalaru	Urundai	
2009	Padikkadavan	Hanumanthu	
2009	Thoranai	Murugan's friend	
2009	Oru Kadhalan Oru Kadhali	College student	
2009	Odipolama	Visu's friend	
2012	Kadhal Paathai		
2014	Kovalanin Kadhali		
2014	Virattu		
2014	Thalaivan		
2019	Vilambaram		
2023	Maan Vettai		

Kannada film

- Love (2004)
