= Race (2013 film) =

- Promotional poster
- Directed by: Ramesh Raparthi
- Written by: Shankar (dialogues)
- Produced by: Anne Ravi
- Starring: Vikram; Bharat Kishore; Karthik; Disha Pandey; Nikitha Narayan
- Cinematography: S Muralimohan Reddy
- Music by: Vivek Sagar; Sanjay
- Production company: Anand Cine Chitra
- Release date: 1 March 2013
- Country: India
- Language: Telugu

Race is a 2013 Indian Telugu-language romantic comedy heist thriller film directed by Ramesh Raparthi and produced by Anne Ravi. The films stars Manasara-fame Vikram, Bharat Kishore, Karthik, Disha Pandey and Nikitha Narayan. The film was released to negative reviews.

== Cast ==
- Vikram Veer as Abhiram
- Bharat Kishore as Sidharth
- Karthik as Chaitanya
- Disha Pandey as Aarthi
- Nikitha Narayan as Anjali
- Srinivasa Reddy
- Phani Eggone
- Gundu Sudarshan
- Fish Venkat

== Production ==
Vikram told his childhood friend Ramesh Raparthy about an idea of three friends going to Bangkok. Pre-production work for the film took ten months. Debutant actors Bharat Kishore and Karthik play full length roles along with Vikram. The film was titled Race because it is a race for "money, honey (girls) and stability". The film is different from The Hangover (2009) and Zindagi Na Milegi Dobara (2011) since it is a thriller.

== Soundtrack ==
The music was composed by Vivek Sagar and Sanjay. The lyrics were written by Sri Mani. The audio launch was attended by Venkatesh and Gopichand.

Track listing
No.	Title	Lyrics	Singer(s)	Length
1.	"Prapanchame"	Sri Mani	Vivek Sagar, Karthik	3:35
2.	"Yammayo"	Sri Mani	Pranavi, Deepu	4:37
3.	"One Daylo"	Sri Mani	Dinakar, Aishan Vali, Vivek Sagar	4:35
4.	"Madhurame"	Jayasurya	Pranavi	2:28
5.	"Race Theme"	Sri Mani	Aishan Vali, Masaki	3:28
Total length:				18:43

== Reception ==
A critic from The Times of India rated the film two out of five stars and wrote that "All the characters fit the bill perfectly and the director did extract his pound of flesh from them but ultimately he tests the patience of the moviegoers as the film drags". A critic from Idlebrain.com wrote that "Shot mostly in Thailand, this film has style quotient. However, the emotions and narration should have been better. The taking of film is amateurish and there is no compactness in direction". A critic from fullhyd.com wrote that "On the list of lost causes, Race isn't in the same league as, say, Mythri. You still wouldn't want to spend two and a half hours watching it in a movie hall, or even in the comfort of your home". On the contrary, a critic from Indiaglitz wrote that "Race, surprisingly, is a worthy watch. Watch out for the dialogue, the neat performances, the smart execution. But have ordinary expectations".
