= Andhra Pradesh Residential School, Kodigenahalli =

Residential school in India

Information
- Motto: Thama Soma Jyothirgamaya (Enlighten the darkness)
- Established: 1972; 54 years ago

The Andhra Pradesh Residential School, Kodigenahalli (APRSK), is one of the oldest residential schools of Andhra Pradesh state, situated in Parigi mandal Anantapur district (present day Sri Sathya Sai district of India. It was established in 1972 by the state government of Andhra Pradesh to provide education in the rural areas of some districts in Rayalaseema, specifically: Anantapur, Chittoor, Kadapa, Kurnool and Nellore. This is one of the three residential schools that were established in the state by the state government, along with Andhra Pradesh Residential School, Tadikonda and Andhra Pradesh Residential School, Sarvail. Soon after its establishment, the school gained yearly top ten ranking in the Secondary School Certificate (SSC) Exams conducted by the Board of Secondary Education, Government of Andhra Pradesh.

The school motto is "Thama Soma Jyothirgamaya", which means "Enlighten the darkness".

== School and students ==
The APRSK institution was established in 1972 by the state government of Andhra Pradesh to provide free education for rural and poor background students who were successful in the open talent search examination conducted by the state government. Initially the exam was conducted for the students of five districts; Anantapur, Kadapa, Kurnool, Nellore, and Chittoor. The exam is now restricted to only one district, Anantapur.

The activities of the children start very early in the morning with a physical exercise class (Drill) and last till the study hours ending at 9.30 p.m.

The National Cadet Corps (N.C.C.) is a part of the children's extracurricular activities. Many of the students from the earlier batches participated in the (Republic Day Parade RDC), which is held at New Delhi on 26 January every year (The Republic Day of India).

The students take part in the district sports meets known as "Griggs" and have won the overall championship trophy several times. They have also participated in district, state, and national science fairs, and have won numerous prizes.

== The School prayer ==
"Ya kundendu Thusharahara Dhavalaa,
Ya Subhra Vasthranvithaa,
Ya veenaa varadandamanditha karaa
Ya swetha padmasanaa,
Ya brahmachyutha Sankara Prabhruthibhirdevai Sadaa Pujithaa,
Samaampathu Saraswathee Bhagavathee Nissesha Jadyapaha..."

" యా కుందేందు తుషారహార ధవళా యా శుభ్ర వస్త్రాన్వితా .. యా వీణా వరదండ మండిత కరా యా శ్వేత పద్మాసనా .. యా బ్రహ్మాచ్యుత శంకర ప్రభ్రుతిభిర్దేవై సదా పూజితా... సామాంపాతు సరస్వతీ భగవతీ నిశ్శేష జాడ్యాపః ..!!! "

This sacred hymn is sung by the students daily when the school assembles in the morning, prior to the beginning of classes. The hymn, which is written in the ancient Sanskrit language, is a tribute to the Goddess of education, Saraswati, which means :

"Oh Goddess Saraswathi..! Who is as fair as a jasmine flower, the moon or a snow flake, who is dressed in flawless white and whose hands are adorned by Veena (a musical instrument), who is seated in a white lotus, to whom Brahma, Vishnu and Shiva pray..Please, protect us...!!!

This prayer is followed by the Indian National Anthem and poem No.35 of "Gitanjali", one of the writings of Rabindranath Tagore, the Nobel Prize in Literature winner :

"Where the mind is without fear and the head is held high,
Where knowledge is free,
Where the world has not been broken up into fragments by narrow domestic walls,
Where words come out from the depth of truth,
Where tireless striving stretches its arms towards the perfection,
Where the clear stream of reason has not lost its way into the dreary desert sand of dead habit,
Where the mind is led forward by thee into ever widening thought and action,
Into that heaven of freedom, my father, let my country awake!"

== School song ==
""Jayathu Jai Jayathu Jai Jaya Paathasala !
Jayathu Jai Jayathu Jai Jaya Punya Seela !!

Rayalelina Seema Rathanaala Seema !
Rathanaala Seemalo Ramya Gurukulamu !
Pennaa Nadee Theera Prantha Bhushanamu !
Chennaina Kodigenahalli Puravaramu !!

Aa Ananthapuramu Nundi Nellooru !
Varaku Nuragala Thoda Uppongi Paaru !
Pennaye Maaku Sambamdhambu Koorcha !
Paragu Rayalaseema Rathnaalu Memu !!

Vidyaa Vayo Vruddhulaina Guruvarulu !
Sathkarma Nirathulai Sadbuddhuleeya !
Padmanabhunde Ma Kalpalatha Kaaga !
Varaledi Vidyaardhi Vajraalu Memu !
Bhaavibhaaratha Veera Pourulamu Memu !

Pedalani Dhanikulani Bhedame Ledu !
Saadarambou Prema Bhaavame Kaladu !
Levu Maalo Jaathi Matha Vibhedamulu !
Saanthi Kaanthule Maaku Sarala Maargamulu !
Deena Jana Sevaa Paraayaname Deeksha !
Dharma Nirvahaname Maakadhika Raksha !!""

The school song goes on this way in Telugu script and is written by Sri.P.Venkateswarlu,(Telugu teacher) in the early years of the school..

జయతు జై ! జయతు జై ! జయ పాఠశాల !
జయతు జై ! జయతు జై ! జయ పుణ్యశీల !!

రాయలేలిన సీమ రతనాల సీమ.,
రతనాల సీమలో రమ్య గురుకులము.,
పెన్నా నదీ తీర ప్రాంత భూషణము.,
చెన్నైన కొడిగెనహళ్లి పురవరము.. !!

ఆ అనంతపురము నుండి నెల్లూరు..
వరకు నురగల తోడి ఉప్పొంగి పారు.,
పెన్నయే మాకు సంబంధంబు కూర్చ.,
పరగు రాయలసీమ రత్నాలు మేము.. !!

విద్యా వయో వృద్ధులైన గురువరులు.,
సత్కర్మ నిరతులై సద్బుద్ధులీయ.,
పద్మనాభుండు మా కల్పలత కాగ.,
వరలెడి విద్యార్ధి వజ్రాలు మేము.,
భావి భారత వీర పౌరులము మేము..!!

పేదలని ధనికులని భేదమే లేదు.,
సాదరంబౌ ప్రేమ భావమే కలదు.,
లేవు మాలో జాతి మత విభేదములు.,
శాంతి కాంతులె మాకు సరళ మార్గములు.,
దీన జన సేవా పరాయణమే దీక్ష.,
ధర్మ నిర్వహణమే మాకధిక రక్ష..!!! || జయ ||

== The House system (dormitories) ==
- White House -
- Green House -
- Tikkana Somayaji House -
- Sri Krishnadevaraya House -
- C.R.R House (Cattamanchi Ramalinga Reddy House) -
- New Dormitory -

== Uniform ==
The official uniform is a cream-coloured shirt and khaki colour knickers (shorts). after 2015 khaki pants are allowed to higher sections The Colour Party (Band Set) dress code is white shirt and white pant (trousers).
