= Sai Rajesh =

Indian film director, writer and producer

Sai Rajesh Neelam
- Born: Nellore, Andhra Pradesh, India
- Occupations: Film director; writer; producer
- Years active: 2014–present

Sai Rajesh Neelam is an Indian film director, screenwriter and producer who works in Telugu cinema. He has produced Colour Photo (2020) under Amrutha Productions, which won him the National Film Award for Best Feature Film in Telugu. His film Baby (2023) grossed ₹100 crore worldwide, becoming the tenth highest-grossing Telugu film of the year.

== Filmography ==
Key
†	Denotes films that have not yet been released

Year	Title	Director	Producer	Writer	Ref.
2014	Hrudaya Kaleyam	Yes	Yes	Yes	
2019	Kobbari Matta	Yes	Yes	Yes	
2020	Colour Photo	No	Yes	Yes	
2023	Baby	Yes	No	Yes	
2026	Chennai Love Story	No	Yes	Yes	

== Awards and nominations ==
Year	Work	Award	Category	Result	Ref.
2021	Colour Photo	9th South Indian International Movie Awards	Best Debut Producer – Telugu	Won	
2022	Colour Photo	68th National Film Awards	Best Feature Film in Telugu	Won	
2023	Baby	22nd Santosham Film Awards	Best Director	Won	
2024	Baby	69th Filmfare Awards South	Critics Best Film – Telugu	Won	
2024	Baby	12th South Indian International Movie Awards	Best Director – Telugu	Nominated	
2024	Baby	12th South Indian International Movie Awards	Critics Best Director – Telugu	Won	
2024	Baby	3rd IIFA Utsavam	Best Director – Telugu	Nominated	
2024	Baby	71st National Film Awards	National Film Award for Best Screenplay (Original)	Won	
