= Kalaratri (film) =

2025 Malayalam film

- Directed by: Anand Krishna Raj
- Written by: Anand Krishna Raj
- Starring: Thambu Wilson; Abhimanue Sajeev; Jolly Antony
- Cinematography: Ligin Eldho Alias
- Edited by: Anand Krishna Raj
- Music by: Thomas Hans Ben; Rishad Musthafa
- Release date: 2025
- Country: India
- Language: Malayalam

Kalaratri is 2025 Indian Malayalam language survival thriller film directed by, written by, and edited by Anand Krishna Raj. The film stars Thambu Wilson and Abhimanue Sajeev. The plot follows a newly married couple whose late-night shortcut drive turns into a tragic nightmare.

== Plot ==
Kalaratri follows newlyweds Sunny and Sruthy, who, while returning from a trip late at night, take a shortcut that leads to tragedy when they accidentally hit and kill someone in a car accident, leaving them stranded as their vehicle breaks down. In search of help, they end up at a house where several characters—each with troubled pasts and hidden motives—converge for a single, suspense-filled night. As the narrative unfolds, blending present events with flashbacks, mounting tensions and psychological traumas among the characters escalate into violence and dark revelations, making the night an ordeal of survival and moral reckoning.

== Cast ==
- Thambu Wilson as Sruthi
- Abhimanue Sajeev as Sunny
- Jolly Antony as Thampi
- Maria Abish as Durga
- Adrian Abish as Kannan

== Production ==
Kalaratri was directed by Anand Krishna Raj, who also wrote the story, screenplay, and dialogues, and served as the film's editor. The film was produced by M/S Greymonk Pictures LLP. The main cast includes Thambu Wilson, Abhimanue Sajeev, Jolly Antony, Maria Abish, and Adrian Abish. Ligin Eldho Alias served as the cinematographer. The original music score was composed by Rishad Musthafa, with lyrics by Thomas Hans Ben.

== Release ==
The film received an "A" category (Adult) certificate from the Central Board of Film Certification (CBFC) Regional Office in Thiruvananthapuram on May 14, 2025.

The film skipped theatrical release and was made available on manoramaMAX OTT on 28 September 2025.

== Reception ==
Manorama Online reviewed Kalaratri as a dark thriller that effectively blends mystery and action through interweaving timelines. The review praised the performances of all actors and the technical competence of director Anand Krishnaraj, with cinematography by Lijin Eldo Elias demonstrating satisfactory work in cinematography and editing. The film's title references Kalaratri, the fierce form of Goddess Durga symbolizing the destruction of darkness and evil. The review noted innovative editing techniques and recommended the film for dark thriller enthusiasts.

Onmanorama's review praised the film's ability to craft an unsettling atmosphere of dread as protagonists Sunny and Zoya seek refuge in a mysterious house during a night drive. Adrian Abhish's performance was singled out as stealing the show, while the cinematography by Lijin Eldho Alisa and Divin George Kurian effectively built suspense throughout. The emotional bond between two children in the house was noted as adding significant depth to the narrative.
