= Madhura Audio =

- Type: Public
- Industry: Music Entertainment
- Headquarters: Hyderabad, Telangana, India,
- Area served: Global
- Key people: Madhura Sreedhar Reddy (Managing Director)
- Products: Online Music Services, Music cassettes, Compact Disc, VCDs, DVDs, Blu-ray Disc
- Number of employees: 50

Madhura Audio is an Indian record label from Hyderabad, Telangana, India. It has a presence in Tollywood, acronym for the Telugu film industry. Madhura Audio is one of the mainstream music record label from Andhra Pradesh and Telangana.

== Overview ==
Madhura Audio was established by its managing director, Madhura Sreedhar Reddy. Madhura Audio started with distribution and marketing of music of other music labels for the state of Andhra Pradesh and later acquiring their own music rights, specially from films in Tollywood.

== Filmography ==
=== Telugu ===
- Eerojullo Romantic Crime Story (2013)
- Mallela Theeram Lo Sirimalle Puvvu (2013)
- Ko Antey Koti (2012)
- Pranayam (2013)
- Chinna Cinema (2013)
- Priyathama Neevachata Kushalama (2013)
- Fire
- Life (2013)
- Anthaka Mundu Aa Tarvatha (2013)
- Kiss (2013)
- Love Life (2013)
- Waiting For You (2013)
- Welcome Obama (2013)
- Mondodu (2014)
- Nayana (2013)
- Music Magic (2013)
- Bunny n Cherry (2013)
- First Love (2013)
- Jananam (2013)
- Man of The Match (2013)
- Prema Ishq Kaadhal (2013)
- Hrudhayam Ekkadunnadi (2013)
- Brundavanamulo 24 Gantalu
- Madhumati (2013)
- Missed Call (2013)
- Ide Charutho Dating (2013)
- Basanti (2014)
- Nakaithe Nachindi (2015)
- Tanu Nenu Mohammad Rafi (2015)
- Kothaga Rekkalochena (2016)
- Prabhanjanam (2014)
- Hang Up (2014)
- Ninnu Chusi Vennele Anukunna (2014)
- Hrudaya Kaleyam (2014)
- Pelladandi Premenchaka Mathrame (2014)
- Lover Boy Clover Ammayi (2014)
- Aarya Chitra (2014)
- Maine Pyar Kiya (2014)
- Weekend Love (2014)
- Vatapatra Sai
- Ladies & Gentlemen (2015 film) (2015)
- Maaya (2014 film) (2014)
- Tolisandya Velalo
- A Shyam Gopal Varma Film (2015)
- Om Mangalam Mangalam (2014)
- Kavvintha (2016)
- Jilla (2014)
- Trivikraman (2016)
- Hora Hori (2013)
- Cinema Choopistha Mava (2015)
- O Sthree Repu Raa (2016)
- Ramasakkani Rakumarudu (2016)
- Sankarabharanam
- Veeri Veeri Gummadi Pandu (2015)
- Ameerpet Lo (2015)
- Kalyana Vaibhogame (2016)
- Premante Suluvu Kadura (2016)
- Maunanga (2015)
- Bommala Ramaaram (2016)
- Love Cheyala Vadda (2016)
- Coach No.9 (2016)
- Muddapappu Avakai (2016)
- Anustaanam (2016)
- Oka Manasu (2016)
- Nayaki (2016)
- Aithe 2.0 (2015)
- Aranyamlo (2016)
- Atu Itu Kani Hrudayam Thoti (2016)
- Pelli Choopulu (2016)
- Kadhanam (2016)
- Raagam(2004)
- ABCD: American Born Confused Desi(2019)
- Dorasaani(2019)
- George Reddy (2019)
- Maataraani Mounamidhi (2022)
- Dhakshina (2024)

=== Devotional albums ===
- Padana Telugu Patta
- Devia Swaranajali
- Bhajana Sudhajhari
- Nirmala Tattwalu
- Swami Vivekananda
- Sri Krishna Ganamrutham
- MAHAVEERA BAJARANGBALI
- Swamy Sannidhanam
- Sri Sai Sthotranjali
- Ganapriya
- Navamrutha Tattva Geethika
- Jyothirmayi Gazals
- Om Sai Namo Namaha
- Swararaagamaalika
- Nee Apaaramaina Prema
- Nibandhana Rakthamu
- Dayadakshinya Poorunda
- Omkareswarudu
- Sai Geetanjali
- Sai Gaananjali
- Naa Pranadharamu
- Sai Smaranam
- Raaganjali
- Nithyuda
- Sharanam Shabareesha
