= Kobbari Matta =

Sai Guru Matta
- Release Poster
- Directed by: Sai Rajesh Neelam
- Written by: Sai Rajesh Neelam
- Produced by: Sai Rajesh Neelam
- Starring: Sampoornesh Babu
- Cinematography: Mujeer Malik
- Edited by: Karthika Srinivas
- Music by: Kamran
- Production company: Amrutha Productions
- Release date: 10 August 2019
- Country: India
- Language: Telugu

Kobbari Matta (transl. Coconut frond) is a 2019 Indian Telugu-language parody film directed by Sai Rajesh Neelam. It stars Sampoornesh Babu portraying roles of three generations- Paparayudu, Pedarayudu, and Androyudu.

The film was released theatrically on 10 August 2019 and become a decent hit.

== Cast ==
- Sampoornesh Babu in a triple role as Paparayudu, Pedarayudu, and Androidu (And+Rayudu=Androidu)
- Ishika Singh as Janaki
- Shakeela as Pandu
- Mahesh Kathi as Kamudu
- Gayathri Gupta

== Soundtrack ==
No.	Title	Singer(s)	Length
1.	"A Aa Ee E"	Rahul Sipligunj, Lipsika
2.	"Kobbari Aakulu"	Vinayak Satheesh
3.	"Sambo Shiva Samboo"	Saaketh Kommandoori
4.	"Android"	L. V. Revanth, Mohana Bhogaraju
5.	"Vethikina"	Dhanunjay

== Reception ==
Hemanth Kumar of Firstpost rated the film 3/5 and stated: "Kobbari Matta is not only consistently absurd and over the top, but also, it’s an excuse to laugh at ourselves and the cliches prevalent in Telugu cinema." On performances, The Hindu Y. Sunitha Chowdhary opined: "Sampoornesh gets enough dances to show his talent and it is evident he has worked hard to shed his potbelly. Mahesh Katti shines as Kaamudu." A reviewer from Cinema Express also rated the film 3/5 and wrote, "This isn’t a film that takes itself too seriously but is meant to be ridiculous and some more."
