= Sampoornesh Babu =

Indian film actor

- Born: Sampoo; Siddipet, Andhra Pradesh (now Telangana), India
- Other name: Sampo
- Occupation: Actor
- Years active: 2009–present
- Known for: Hrudaya Kaleyam; Kobbari Matta
- Spouse: Uma Rani
- Awards: CineMAA Award for Best Actor in Comic Role (2015)

Narasimha Chary, popularly known by his screen name Sampoornesh Babu, is an Indian actor known for his works in the spoof comedy genre in Telugu cinema. He made his acting debut as the lead role in the 2014 film, Hrudaya Kaleyam, for which he won the CineMAA Award for Best Actor in a Comic Role. He was a contestant in Bigg Boss Telugu.

== Acting career ==
He appeared in cameo roles in many movies, including Current Theega (2014) as Sunny Leone's fiancé, and Allari Naresh's Bandipotu (2015). His next full time stint was in the film Singham 123 (2015), a parody of several films.

In 2019, he played three roles in Kobbari Matta (2019). Later that year, he shot for Takkari Donga Chalaki Chukka but the film remains unreleased. In 2020, he announced his film ? which he promoted as the last film to be shot in Wuhan before the COVID-19 pandemic.

== Filmography ==
=== Film ===
Key
†	Denotes films that have not yet been released

Year	Film	Role	Notes	Ref.
2009	Mahatma	Protester		
2014	Hrudaya Kaleyam	Sampoornesh "Sampoo" Babu	Debut as lead actor	
2014	Current theega	Sunny's fiancé	Cameo appearance	
2015	Pesarattu		Cameo appearance	
2015	Bandipotu	Tellabbai		
2015	Singham 123	Singham 123		
2015	Jyothi Lakshmi		Cameo appearance	
2015	Where Is Vidya Balan	Ganta		
2016	Lacchimdeviki O Lekkundi			
2016	Bhadram Be Careful Brotheru	Aspiring actor		
2017	Raja the Great	Peter	Cameo appearance	
2018	Devadas	Actor	Cameo appearance	
2019	Kobbari Matta	Paparayudu, Pedarayudu, Androyudu	Triple role	
2019	Kathanam	Himself	Cameo appearance	
2021	Bazaar Rowdy	Kali		
2021	Cauliflower	Andy Flower and Cauliflower	Dual role	
2023	Martin Luther King	Martin Luther King (Smile)		
2025	Sodara			
2026	The Paradise	Biryani		

=== Television ===
Year	Show	Role	Channel	Result
2017	Bigg Boss Telugu (season 1)	Contestant	Star Maa	Walked on Day 9
2019	Kalyani	Guest	GeminiTV	TV serial guest appearance
2026	Super Subbu	Sunil Mama	Netflix	Web Series
