= Rich Kid (film) =

2026 Indian Telugu

- Theatrical release poster
- Directed by: Shafi Vullah; Anil Derangula
- Screenplay by: Shafi Vullah
- Produced by: G. Manjunath Reddy
- Starring: G. Manjunath Reddy; Rajasekhar Aning; Chelly Swapna; Supriya Marla; Suman Setty
- Cinematography: APM Malli; Dharma GG
- Music by: Srivenkat; Lalith Kiran
- Production company: Sree Manjunatha Cinemas
- Release date: 23 April 2026
- Running time: 125 minutes
- Country: India
- Language: Telugu

Rich Kid is a 2026 Indian Telugu-language drama film directed by Shafi Vullah and Anil Derangula. The film stars G. Manjunath Reddy, Rajasekhar Aning, Chelly Swapna, Supriya Marla, Suman Setty and others. The film is produced by G. Manjunatha Reddy under Sree Manjunath Cinemas.

The film was released on 23 April 2026.

== Plot ==
A devoted father, determined to see his son succeed, is willing to go to any extent to support his ambitions. He fulfills all of his son’s wishes, even going so far as to sell his own house. As the story unfolds, the consequences of his sacrifices come to light. The film explores whether the father’s unwavering dedication ultimately benefits his son, and reveals the choices the son makes and how they shape the outcome of their lives.

== Cast ==
- G. Manjunath Reddy as Srinivas
- Supriya as Padmavathi
- Rajasekhar Aning as Venkatesh
- Chelly Swapna as Bhudevi
- Suman Shetty as Puli Gadu
- Ping Pong Surya as Jeevan
- Balagam Sanjay Krishna as Vaddeela Vishwa
- Jabardasth Durga Rao as Kaki

== Music ==
The background score and songs were composed by Srivenkat and Lalith Kiran. The audio rights were acquired by Aditya Music.

No.	Title	Lyrics	Singer(s)	Length
1.	"Pachhani Pallelo"	Vishnu Vardhan	Chandrasekhar Azad, Prathyusha	4:14
2.	"Sakkanode Sakkaanode"	Lalith Kiran	GV Shri Kerthii	3:33
3.	"Ponganala Pooja"	Vishnu Vardhan	Vinayak	3:06
4.	"Yetta Penchinaavu Raa"	Vishnu Vardhan	Yogi Suresh	4:45
5.	"Kaalabhairavam Bhaje"	Shafi Vullah	Vinayak	4:41
Total length:				20:19

== Release ==
Rich Kid was released on 23 April 2026.

== Reception ==
Suhas Sistu of The Hans India stated "Rich Kid is a feel-good entertainer with emotional depth and relatable characters, making it an enjoyable watch for family audiences".

Sakshi Post said "Rich Kid is a simple, emotion-driven family drama that relies on its core sentiment, offering a watchable, one-time experience with a few heartfelt moments".

Sunil Boddula from News18 Telugu stated "Rich Kid is an enjoyable family film with a good blend of comedy, emotions, and music, making it a must-watch with a meaningful message".
