= Love Me (2024 Indian film) =

2024 Indian film

- Theatrical release poster
- Directed by: Arun Bhimavarapu
- Written by: Arun Bhimavarapu
- Produced by: Harshith Reddy; Hanshitha Reddy; Naga Mallidi
- Starring: Ashish Reddy; Vaishnavi Chaitanya
- Cinematography: P. C. Sreeram
- Edited by: Santhosh Kamireddy
- Music by: M. M. Keeravani
- Production company: Dil Raju Productions
- Release date: 25 May 2024
- Running time: 128 minutes
- Country: India
- Language: Telugu

Love Me (also marketed as Love Me If You Dare) is a 2024 Indian Telugu-language romantic horror thriller film written and directed by Arun Bhimavarapu. Produced by Dil Raju Productions, the film features Ashish Reddy and Vaishnavi Chaitanya in primary roles.

The film was theatrically released on 25 May 2024.

== Plot ==
Arjun is a daredevil YouTuber known for investigating unsolved mysteries and taking on challenges that others avoid. He lives with Pratap, his childhood friend. Pratap in search of interesting content, expresses his interest in knowing whereabouts of a girl from his childhood and seeks help from his girlfriend Priya in tracing the girl. Long ago, there was a large bungalow in their village. A married couple enter it one day and even after years, no one in the village saw the woman. Every night at 8pm, an alarm goes off and there would be loud crying noises from the bungalow that last an hour. After 7 years, one day, the woman comes out but completely caught in fire. The burning woman walks on the street and eventually dies. Next day, some villagers dare to go into the building when they find the husband dead but are shocked to see a kid. This is the girl Pratap wants to know about.

Priya informs Pratap that the girl after growing up, committed suicide after losing her husband to an accident on the day of marriage, and turned into a ghost Divyavathi, in the apartment they are supposed to move into post marriage. Arjun, who overhears the story decides to go the apartment committed to know about Divyavathi. In spite of rumours that the ghost kills whoever enters that abandoned apartment, Arjun walks in and expresses his desire to her to know more. He enquires the builder and he shows the photo clicked of her at the under construction apartment during a visit before her marriage. The builder also confirms that he heard about the suicide from the workers and he never actually saw her dead body. Arjun believes her to be alive and loves her. He never tries to look at her, attempts to please her by offering gifts and invites her for a date. Pratap arrives there with Priya and Pinky and tries to convince that there is only ghost in the house and the girl is dead. To prove it, they dig up her grave and Pinky reconstructs the face and it matches with that of the picture shared by the builder. Distressed, Arjun goes back to his normal life.

Priya attempts to console him but falls in love with him after hearing how much he loves a person who he never saw. Pratap who is in search of the kid from the building finds photos of 3 girls Pallavi, Noor, Charisma during his research and he believes the girl is likely one of them. However, it doesn't match with that of Divyavathi. He, Arjun and Priya continue the search and gets to know that all the girls were reported missing. They also learn about connected deaths of three women, each reported on the following day of the missing report but the names don't match. Pallavi goes missing and the death report is of Vennela. Noor goes missing and the report is of Pallavi. Charisma goes missing and the death report is of Noor. Amid the confusion, Arjun digs up all 3 bodies and has Pinky reconstruct the faces which leaves everyone confused. Pinky unsolves the mystery. In all 3 deaths, faces are beyond recognizable and the girl they were searching for should have taken advantage of that to swap her identity each time.

Arjun goes alone to the grave at night where he finds the girl in the wedding attire and it turns out to be Priya. She tells her side of the story. During her childhood, no one knew about her existence except one boy who offered her a ribbon box as a present through the window. After her parents die, a police officer rescues her and she is adopted by a loving family. She is haunted by the memories of her mother facing torture and she finally committing suicide by alighting herself. The adopted family used to have a kid called Vennela who died early. Now, this girl dresses up as Vennela to earn love from the parents. She lives happily for few years but then the trauma hits her back when the parents also die. She is made fun of by her fellow students in college because of her trauma driven behaviour. She comes across an accident spot, where Pallavi died and she swaps her id card with that of dead body and assumes the name of Pallavi and moves on. Meanwhile, Police declare Vennela to be dead but she still carries the trauma. Similarly, she assumes identities of Noor and Charisma when they die by accidents.

One day, she stumbled upon a YouTube video featuring Pratap casually talking from what seemed to be her childhood home's vicinity. The familiarity struck her with a wave of nostalgia and excitement. Driven by curiosity and a tinge of nervousness, she decided to attend a party hosted by Pratap himself, an impromptu invitation she orchestrated for herself. She hesitated briefly, unsure if she should approach him after all these years. Just when she was about to leave, feeling a bit out of place, her eyes caught sight of a familiar object: a simple ribbon box on a shelf. Gathering courage, she approached Pratap, introducing herself under a new identity, Priya.

Pratap and Priya, both fall in love and she is happy again until now. When Pratap wanted to learn about the kid from the building, she created a fake story of Divyavathi based on the suicide she learned about online to keep Pratap away from the truth. But since Arjun went in search of Divyavathi, she had to scare him off. However, she falls in love with Arjun instead after she got to know about his acceptance and love for a person he never saw. Arjun tells her that her way of dealing with trauma through escape has to change. He says she is going to get even more sadness now but she has to deal with it properly as he stabs himself and dies in her hands.

Priya doesn't change her identity now but lives through in good ways. One day, she goes to Pratap to console him about Arjun's death when he was packing Arjun's stuff. Then she learns the boy who gifted her ribbon was not Pratap but Arjun. She collapses after she connects the dots. Arjun has been in love with her from childhood and he dared to enter the apartment only because of that and accepted her the way she was. After a few days when she enters her home, she sees a ribbon box on her window as well as receives a notification on her mobile about Arjun's YouTube channel. She rushes outside her home suspecting that someone is watching her. After a short few mins, she is convinced that it's Arjun and she frantically runs all around shouting his name. Sure enough Arjun greets her.

As a twist to the story, it turned out that Arjun hadn't succumbed to the stab as initially believed. Instead, he had orchestrated a risky rescue plan with the help of Pinky. Since Priya has now learned how to deal with trauma as Arjun wished, they both unite. On the day of their first night, Arjun mentions that it's not their first time getting together to which Priya expresses shock. Then as a double twist, it is revealed that the person with whom Arjun united with on one of the nights, during his stay in the apartment was the ghost of real Divyavathi which is still in the apartment.

== Cast ==
- Ashish Reddy as Arjun
- Vaishnavi Chaitanya as Priya
- Ravi Krishna as Prathap
- Simran Choudhary as Pinky
- Rajeev Kanakala as Builder
- Samyuktha as Divyavathi (cameo appearance)
- Ruhani Sharma as Pallavi (cameo appearance)
- Divi Vadthya as Noor (cameo appearance)
- Daksha Nagarkar as Charishma (cameo appearance)

== Production ==
The film was announced and started filming in late 2023. Vaishnavi Chaitanya was announced as the lead actress, in December 2023. The motion poster of the film was revealed in February 2024, whereas filming was completed in March 2024.

== Music ==
Love Me

Soundtrack album by M. M. Keeravani
- Released: 2024
- Recorded: 2024
- Language: Telugu
- Label: T-Series
- Producer: M. M. Keeravani

M. M. Keeravani chronology
Naa Saami Ranga (2024)	Love Me (2024)	Hari Hara Veera Mallu: Part 1 – Sword vs Spirit (2024)

The film's soundtrack album and background score were composed by M. M. Keeravani. The first song "Raavaali Raa" was released on 30 March 2024.

All lyrics are written by Chandrabose; all music is composed by M. M. Keeravani.

Track list
No.	Title	Singer(s)	Length
1.	"Raavaali Raa"	Amala Chebolu, Gomathi Iyer, Aditi Bhavaraju, Satya Yamini, Ajmal Fatima Parveen, Sai Shreya	2:57
2.	"Stupid Heart"	Sai Shreya	3:58
3.	"Raavaali Raa (Vaishnavi)"	Vaishnavi Chaitanya	3:03
4.	"Em Avuthundo"	Niteesh Kondiparthi, Gomathi Iyer	3:44

== Release ==
It was premiered on Aha on 17 June 2024.

== Reception ==
Times Now's Sasidhar Adivi opined that the screenplay is "overdone and fluffy" which made the film a letdown. Echoing the same NTV gave the same rating while criticising the screenplay and pace of the film. 10TV gave a rating of 2.75 out of 5 and gave a mixed review.
