= Madhura Sreedhar Reddy =

Indian film director

- Born: Warangal, Telangana, India
- Education: NIT Warangal, IIT Madras
- Occupations: Film director; producer; writer
- Years active: 2010–present

Madhura Sreedhar Reddy is an Indian film director, producer, and distributor who works in Telugu cinema. He started his film career by music label Madhura Audio and eventually turned as a director with the film Sneha Geetham in 2010.

Reddy also directed films such as It's My Love Story and Backbench Student

== Background ==
Reddy was born and raised in Warangal. He is a B.Tech graduate from Regional Engineering College (REC, currently called as NIT Warangal). He completed his MS (Research) from IIT Madras and received Gold Medal for his excellency by Vice President of India. He worked in many multinational companies like TCS, Infosys, Wipro and TecMahindra.

== Career ==
Reddy made his directorial debut with Sneha Geetham, and later directed It’s My Love Story and Backbench Student.

His first film as producer is Maaya, directed by Neelakanta.

Reddy went on to produce films such as Ladies & Gentlemen, Oka Manasu Designer s/o Ladies Tailor, ABCD: American Born Confused Desi and Dorasaani (2019).

== Awards ==
Madhura Sreedhar Reddy has won Best Debutante Director for Sneha Geetham. His movie Ladies & Gentlemen won Nandi Awards for 3rd Best movie and Best Editing for the year 2015.

== Filmography ==
Year	Film	Role	Notes
2010	Sneha Geetham	Director	Debut
2011	It's My Love Story	Director	
2013	Backbench Student	Director	
2013	Prema Ishq Kaadhal	Co-producer	
2014	Maaya	Producer	
2015	Ladies & Gentlemen	Producer	
2016	Oka Manasu	Producer	
2017	Fashion Designer s/o Ladies Tailor	Producer	
2019	ABCD - American Born Confused Desi	Producer	
2019	Dorasaani	Producer	
2021	Love Life & Pakodi	Producer	
2025	Mothevari Love Story	Producer	
2025	Santhana Prapthirasthu	Producer	
