= Pesarattu (film) =

- Directed by: Mahesh Kathi
- Written by: Aripirala Satyaprasad
- Produced by: G Aravind Reddy, Seshagiri, Kiran Gudipalli
- Starring: Nandu; Nikitha Narayan
- Cinematography: Kamalakar
- Edited by: Prasankar
- Music by: Ghantasala Viswanath
- Release date: 6 February 2015 (India)
- Running time: 112 minutes
- Country: India
- Language: telugu

Pesarattu is a 2015 Indian Telugu language comedy drama film directed by Mahesh Kathi and starring Nandu and Nikitha Narayan.

== Plot ==
Bhavana (Nikitha Narayan) is ready to get engaged but faces some confusion. When the day of betrothal arrives her family cannot find her. The groom Yuvaraj (Nandu) arrives and the family finally locates her.

== Cast ==
- Nandu as Yuvaraj
- Nikitha Narayan as Bhavana
- Appaji Ambarisha Darbha as Bhavana's father
- Sampoornesh Babu (cameo appearance)

== Production ==
This is the first-ever crowd-funded, crowd-sourced cooperative film in Telugu. Twelve producers contributed to the making of this film.

== Reception ==
The Times of India noted a film including advertisements as story is one of the perils befalling crowd-funded films in a production's wish to please those who contributed. In analyzing the plot and storyline, while appreciative of the actors they felt the film was overall "pathetic". However, they did find the film's soundtrack album to be "a fun album with good lyrics and enjoyable compositions.".
