= Singham 123 =

- Directed by: Akshat Ajay Sharma
- Written by: Manchu Vishnu
- Produced by: Manchu Vishnu
- Starring: Sampoornesh Babu
- Cinematography: Satish Mutyala
- Edited by: M. R. Varma
- Music by: Seshu
- Distributed by: 24 Frames Factory
- Release date: 5 June 2015
- Country: India
- Language: Telugu

Singham 123 is a 2015 Indian Telugu-language action comedy film directed by Akshat Ajay Sharma and is written and produced by Manchu Vishnu under his production banner 24 Frames Factory. The film stars Sampoornesh Babu in the lead role. The film released on 5 June 2015 to mixed reviews but was a box-office hit. The film has been released by 24 Frames Factory officially for home viewing.

The film is a parody of several films. The action sequence from this film involving a banana became popular.

== Plot ==
Set in the backdrop of a village called Singarayakonda which is ruled by a self-proclaimed king and mafia-lord, Lingam. He fancies himself as the destructive force and an archenemy of Law and Order. After several failed attempts by Indian Police throughout the decade, Singham 123 is assigned the mission impossible - to arrest Lingam. Will Singham 123 be successful in completing the mission?

== Cast ==
- Sampoornesh Babu as Singham 123
- Sanam Shetty as Chandini
- Annapoorna as Annapoorna
- Bhavani as Lingam
- Prudhviraj as Jaggam, Singam 123's father
- Viva Harsha as Junior Lingam (Lingam's son)
- Ambati Srinivas as Home Minister

== Reception ==
A critic from The Hindu wrote that "After a long time comes Sampoornesh’s second film Singham 123 in which he plays a cop and the story that follows his filmi introduction is nothing but collection of spoofs, parodies from all hit films".

A critic from The Hans India rated the film two-and-a-half out of five and wrote that "Watch for good laughs without expecting story".
