= Hrudaya Kaleyam =

- Movie poster
- Directed by: Sai Rajesh Neelam (credited as Steven Shankar)
- Written by: Sai Rajesh Neelam
- Produced by: Sai Rajesh Neelam
- Starring: Sampoornesh Babu
- Cinematography: Ravi Kumar Sana
- Edited by: Karthika Srinivas
- Music by: RK
- Production companies: Amrutha Productions and VSS Creations
- Release date: 4 April 2014
- Running time: 128 minutes
- Country: India
- Language: Telugu
- Budget: ₹1.5 crore (US$160,000)
- Box office: est. ₹4 crore (US$420,000)

Hrudaya Kaleyam is a 2014 Indian Telugu-language parody film directed by Sai Rajesh Neelam. It stars debutant Sampoornesh Babu in the lead role.

The film revolves around a petty thief who robs parts in electronic shops and why he robs electronic shops and departmental stores. The movie was considered a hit at the box office. Since the budget was very low of 1.5 crores, this movie is considered to be one of the highest-grossing low budget movies by getting 4 crores. The film released with low expectations on 4 April 2014 in theaters. Upon release, the film received largely positive reviews from critics and audience for its humour.

== Cast ==
- Sampoornesh Babu as Sampoornesh "Sampoo" Babu
- Swasthika as Samosa
- Keeru as Neelu
- Kathi Mahesh as I.G Bhairav Rathode
- Jain Charan Musturu as Ram Vallabhaneni
- Spot Babu as Pranav
- Swastik as Black Mamba

== Soundtrack ==
Music: RK

- "Nene Baby Shampoo" - Spot Babu
- "Pitthey Vesina Bedaradu" - Junaid Babu
- "Meki Maki Maki Meki" - Jain Babu
- "Hrudaya Vinuve" - Ravindra Tejaswi
- "Ekkadiki Ravalo Cheppu" - Mundamopi
- "Naku Shivarathri" - Geetha Madhuri, Rahul Sipligunj

== Reception ==
The film received positive reviews from critics. The Hindu gave a review stating "While the audience laughs and claps at the spoof, the movie disappoints in the acting skills. The audience seemed oblivious to it though. All actors appear very raw. Some scenes looked straight out of a low budget slow Telugu TV serial. The director seems to have handled the situation well, with one after another clichéd scenes coming with a pun. The director has smartly avoided making the movie a spoof to belittle the Telugu movie industry and larger-than-life heroes. It’s just a fun take on typical masala movies." Jeevi of Idlebrain.com rated the film three-and-a-quarter out of five and wrote that "Hrudaya Kaleyam is first straight film in Telugu in this genre (Sudigaadu was little similar, but was a remake). One has to be tuned to Sampoornesh Babu and Hrudaya Kaleyam teasers in order to enjoy the film to fullest".
