= Ladies & Gentlemen (2015 film) =

- Ladies and Gentlemen poster
- Directed by: P. B. Manjunath
- Screenplay by: P. B. Manjunath
- Story by: Sanjeev Reddy
- Produced by: Madhura Sreedhar Reddy; MVK Reddy
- Starring: Adivi Sesh; Nikitha Narayan; Chaitanya Krishna; Kamal Kamaraju; Mahat Raghavendra; Swathi Deekshith; Jasmin Bhasin
- Cinematography: Jagan Chawali
- Edited by: Naveen Nooli
- Music by: Raghu Kunche
- Production companies: PL Creations; Shirdi Sai Combines
- Release date: 30 January 2015
- Country: India
- Language: Telugu

Ladies & Gentlemen is a 2015 Telugu-language film written and directed by P. B. Manjunath, who makes his directorial debut. An anthology film, it features Adivi Sesh, Nikitha Narayan, Chaitanya Krishna, Kamal Kamaraju, Jasmin Bhasin, Mahat Raghavendra, Swathi Deekshith in pivotal roles. The film, produced by director Madhura Sreedhar Reddy along with MVK Reddy, released on 30 January 2015 to positive response. It is the remake of the 2012 thriller Login.

== Cast ==
- Adivi Sesh as Rahul
- Nikitha Narayan as Priya
- Chaitanya Krishna as Krishnamurthi
- Kamal Kamaraju as Anand
- Mahat Raghavendra as Vijay
- Swathi Deekshith as Deepa
- Jasmin Bhasin as Anjali
- Jeeva
- Raghu Kunche (cameo appearance in the song "Social Network")
- Noel Sean (cameo appearance in the song "Social Network")
- Jr Relangi (cameo appearance in the song "Social Network")

== Soundtrack ==
Ladies & Gentlemen

Soundtrack album by Raghu Kunche
- Released: 2014
- Genre: Feature film soundtrack
- Length: 20:14
- Language: Telugu
- Label: Madhura Audio

Raghu Kunche chronology
| Devudu Chesina Manushulu (2012) | Ladies & Gentlemen (2014) | Dongaata (2015) |
External audio
- Ladies & Gentlemen – Jukebox on YouTube

The music was composed by Raghu Kunche. In a music review, Sashidhar AS of The Times of India rated the album 3/5 and wrote, "All in all, Raghu Kunche's album is well blended with trendy and romantic songs".

All lyrics are written by Sirasri.

Track listing
| No. | Title | Singer(s) | Length |
|---|---|---|---|
| 1. | "Ardham Kani" | Hemachandra, Vaishnavi | 4:03 |
| 2. | "First Time" | Raghu Kunche | 4:22 |
| 3. | "Social Network" | Raghu Kunche, Junior Relangi | 3:50 |
| 4. | "Premaa" | Dinker, Sunil Kashyap, Ramya Behara | 4:15 |
| 5. | "Cocktail" | Sravana Bhargavi, Noel Sean | 3:44 |
| Total length: | | | 20:14 |

== Critical reception ==
The Hindu wrote, "A lot of thought has gone into the screenplay and as the loose ends are tied up towards the end, it’s evident that many earlier sequences and supporting characters have all been there for a reason...Despite shortcomings, it’s commendable that the film doesn’t stick to the formula and play safe". The Times of India gave the film 3 stars out of 5 and wrote, "The film might not rank high in terms of visual aesthetics, but it does suck you into its twisted world where everyone seems to have an agenda of his own", further adding that while "the first half tests your patience", "the second half is riveting and everything falls in to place quite well in the third act". idlebrain.com gave 3.25 out of 5 and called it a "decently made film which is identifiable to all social media users".
