= List of Telugu films of 2013 =

This is a list of Telugu-language films produced in Tollywood in India that are released in 2013.

== Box office ==
Highest-grossing films of 2013
Rank	Title	Production company(s)	Worldwide gross	Share	Ref.
1	Attarintiki Daredi	Sri Venkateswara Cine Chitra	₹145 crore (US$15 million)	₹74.88 crore (equivalent to ₹139 crore or US$14 million in 2026)	
2	Seethamma Vakitlo Sirimalle Chettu	Sri Venkateswara Creations	₹94 crore (US$9.8 million)	₹51 crore (equivalent to ₹95 crore or US$9.8 million in 2026)	
3	Baadshah	Parameswara Art Productions	₹92 crore (equivalent to ₹171 crore or US$18 million in 2026)	₹48.5 crore (equivalent to ₹90 crore or US$9.3 million in 2026)	
4	Mirchi	UV Creations	₹87 crore (equivalent to ₹161 crore or US$17 million in 2026)	₹47.45 crore (equivalent to ₹88 crore or US$9.1 million in 2026)	
5	Naayak	Universal Media	₹84 crore (equivalent to ₹156 crore or US$16 million in 2026)	₹46.5 crore (equivalent to ₹86 crore or US$9.0 million in 2026)	
6	Iddarammayilatho	Parameswara Art Productions	₹70 crore (equivalent to ₹130 crore or US$13 million in 2026)	₹38.34 crore (equivalent to ₹71 crore or US$7.4 million in 2026)	
7	Balupu	PVP Cinema	₹61 crore (equivalent to ₹113 crore or US$12 million in 2026)	₹30 crore (equivalent to ₹56 crore or US$5.8 million in 2026)	
8	Ramayya Vasthavayya	Sri Venkateswara Creations	₹55 crore (equivalent to ₹102 crore or US$11 million in 2026)	₹30.9 crore (equivalent to ₹57 crore or US$6.0 million in 2026)	
9	Gunde Jaari Gallanthayyinde	Shresht Movies	₹40 crore (equivalent to ₹74 crore or US$7.7 million in 2026)	₹22 crore (equivalent to ₹41 crore or US$4.2 million in 2026)	
10	Tadakha	Sri Sai Ganesh Productions	₹35 crore (equivalent to ₹65 crore or US$6.7 million in 2026)	₹21 crore (equivalent to ₹39 crore or US$4.0 million in 2026)	

== January–June ==
Opening		Title	Director	Cast	Production house	Ref
J A N	4th	Sevakudu	V. Samudra	Srikanth, Charmy Kaur, Krishna, Manjula Swaroop	Produced by Sri Venkataramana Art Productions	
J A N	9th	Naayak	V. V. Vinayak	Ram Charan Teja, Kajal Aggarwal, Amala Paul, Pradeep Rawat, Brahmanandam	Produced by Universal Media	
J A N	11th	Seethamma Vakitlo Sirimalle Chettu	Srikanth Addala	Mahesh Babu, Venkatesh, Anjali, Samantha, Prakash Raj, Jayasudha	Produced by Sri Venkateswara Creations	
J A N	24th	Satruvu	NSR Prasad	Srikanth, Aksha	Produced by VS Rami Reddy	
J A N	31st	Case No. 666/2013	Venkat Siddareddy, Purnesh Konathala	Charan Tej, Aditya, Nanda Kishore, Guru Charan, Anurag, Nikitha	Produced by Ashok Babu	
F E B	1st	Ongole Gittha	Bhaskar	Ram Pothineni, Kriti Kharbanda, Prakash Raj, Prabhu	Produced by Sri Venkateswara Cine Chitra	
F E B	1st	Bullabbai	Yuvaraju	Krishnudu, Brahmanandam, Shravani	Produced by Yuvaraju	
F E B	8th	Mirchi	Koratala Siva	Prabhas, Anushka Shetty, Richa Gangopadhyay	Produced by UV Creations	
F E B	14th	Okkadine	Srinivas Raga	Nara Rohit, Nithya Menen	Produced by Gulabi Movies	
F E B	15th	Chammak Challo	G. Neelakanta Reddy	Varun Sandesh, Sanchita Padukone, Catherine Tresa, Vennela Kishore, Srinivas Avasarala	Produced by Sri Sailendra Cinemas	
F E B	15th	Love Cycle	Sapan Kumar	Mangam Srinivas, Reshma Rathore		
F E B	22nd	Jabardasth	Nandini Reddy	Siddharth, Samantha, Nithya Menen	Produced by Sri Sai Ganesh Productions	
M A R	1st	Mr. Pellikoduku	Devi Prasad	Sunil, Isha Chawla, Ravi Babu, Ali	Remake of Tanu Weds Manu; Produced by Megaa Super Good Films	
M A R	1st	Race	Ramesh Raparthi	Vikram, Karthik, Bharat Kishore, Disha Pandey, Nikitha Narayanan		
M A R	8th	Gundello Godari	Kumar Nagendra	Aadhi, Lakshmi Manchu, Sundeep Kishan, Taapsee Pannu	Produced by Manchu Entertainment	
M A R	8th	Mahankali	Jeevitha Rajasekhar	Rajasekhar, Madhurima, Pradeep Rawat	Produced by Anjeri Arts	
M A R	8th	Telugabbai	Vo Yes Avinash	Tanish, Remya Nambeesan, Tashu Kaushik, Naga Babu, Sona Nair	Produced by Vera Film Corporation	
M A R	15th	3G Love	Govardhan Krishna	Avinash, Neelima, Rao Ramesh, Prabhas Sreenu	Produced by SQuareindia Studios Pvt. Ltd.	
M A R	15th	Backbench Student	Madhura Sreedhar Reddy	Mahat Raghavendra, Piaa Bajpai, Archana Jose Kavi	Produced by Multi-dimension Entertainment Pvt Ltd.	
M A R	15th	Rai Rai	Sudhir Raju	Sri, Aksha	Produced by Sravya Balaji	
M A R	22nd	Bakara	CSR Krishnan	Srihari, Pradeep, Yashika, Pawan, Brahmanandam	Produced by Rushil Movies	
M A R	22nd	Swamy Satyananda	Madan Patel	Ravi Chetan, Neha, Anku, Madan Patel	Produced by Maruti Arts	
M A R	23rd	Swamy Ra Ra	Sudheer Varma	Nikhil, Swati Reddy	Produced by Lakshmi Narasimha Entertainments	
M A R	23rd	Priyathama Neevachata Kusalama	Trinadha Rao Nakkina	Varun Sandesh, Hasika, Komal Jha	Produced by J. Samba Siva Rao	
M A R	29th	Aravind 2	Sekhar Suri	Sri, Madhavi Latha, Srinivas Avasarala, Kamal Kamaraju, Adonica	Production by Vijayabheri Studios	
M A R	29th	Jaffa	Vennela Kishore	Brahmanandam, Ali (actor)	Production by Ramesh Varma	
A P R	5th	Baadshah	Srinu Vaitla	Jr. NTR, Kajal Aggarwal, Navdeep	Produced by Parameswara Art Productions	
A P R	11th	Jai Sriram	Balaji N. Sai	Uday Kiran, Reshma Rathod, Nagineedu, M. S. Narayana, Chalapathi Rao	Produced by Thella Ramesh and N.C.H. Rajesh	
A P R	11th	Vasool Raja	Karthika Gopalakrishnan	Navdeep, Srihari, Ritu Barmecha, Sathyam Rajesh	Production by BM Studios	
A P R	19th	Gunde Jaari Gallanthayyinde	Vijay Kumar Konda	Nitin, Nithya Menen, Isha Talwar, Ali	Produced by Shrest Movies	
A P R	19th	Gouravam	Radha Mohan	Allu Sirish, Yami Gautam, Prakash Raj, Nassar, Harish Uthaman	Produced by Duet Movies A Tamil - Telugu bilingual film	
A P R	26th	Shadow	Meher Ramesh	Venkatesh, Tapsee, Srikanth, Madhurima	Produced by United Movies	
M A Y	3rd	Greeku Veerudu	Kondapalli Dasaradh Kumar	Nagarjuna, Nayantara	Produced by Kamakshi Movies	
M A Y	5th	Gully Dada	Shashikanth	Radhika Rathod, Aakash Reddy		
M A Y	10th	Tadakha	Kishore Kumar Pardasani	Naga Chaitanya, Tamannaah, Sunil, Andrea Jeremiah	Produced by Sri Sai Ganesh Productions	
M A Y	10th	Love Touch	Sri Chand	Jayanth, Dhruthi	Produced by NSR films	
M A Y	15th	D/O Varma	Khaja	Vennela Kishore, Naveena Jackson		
M A Y	17th	Sukumarudu	G. Ashok	Aadi, Nisha Aggarwal, Krishna, Sharada, Srinivas Avasarala, Rao Ramesh	Produced by Sri Soudhamani Creations	
M A Y	24th	Chemistry	Vachespathy Jonnalagadda	Sree Ram, Amitha Rao	Produced Vivid Journey Creations	
M A Y	25th	Chukkalanti Ammayi Chakkanaina Abbayi	Kanmani	Tarun Kumar, Vimala Raman		
M A Y	31st	Iddarammayilatho	Puri Jagannadh	Allu Arjun, Amala Paul, Catherine Tresa	Produced by Parameswara Art Productions	
J U N	7th	Pavitra	Janardhan Maharshi	Shriya Saran, Roja, Sai Kumar, Brahmanandam	Produced by Aadesh Films	
J U N	7th	Theatre Lo Naluguru	Srinivasa Raju Dendukuri	Srikanth Raghava, Dheeraj, Swetha Pandit, Varun Abhinay	Produced by Maantrix Media works	
J U N	9th	Prema Katha Chitram	J. Prabhakar Reddy	Sudheer Babu, Nanditha Raj	Produced by RCA Creations and Maruthi Talkies	
J U N	14th	Saradaga Ammayitho	Bhanu Shankar	Varun Sandesh, Nisha Agarwal, Charmee, K. Vishwanath, Brahmanandam	Produced by Sri Kumaraswamy Productions	
J U N	21st	Action 3D	Anil Sunkara	Allari Naresh, Shaam, Vaibhav Reddy, Raju Sundaram, Neelam Upadhyaya, Kamna Jethmalani, Sneha Ullal	Produced by AK Entertainers	
J U N	28th	Balupu	Gopichand Malineni	Ravi Teja, Shruthi Hassan, Anjali, Prakash Raj, Adivi Sesh, Ashutosh Rana, Brahmanandam	Produced by PVP Cinemas	
J U N	28th	Moksha	Srikanth Vemulapalli	Meera Jasmine, Rajeev Mohan, Disha Pandey, Nassar	Produced by Amarnathan Movies	
J U N	28th	Oh My Love	M J Reddy	Raja, Nisha	Produced by Nandini Films	

== July–December ==
Opening		Title	Director	Cast	Production house	Ref
J U L	5th	Mallela Theeram Lo Sirimalle Puvvu	GV Rama Raju	Kranthi, Sri Divya, Jorge	Godavari Cinema	
J U L	5th	Operation Duryodhana 2	Nandam Srinivasa Rao	Jagapathi Babu, Posani Krishna Murali, Rao Ramesh, Vijayachander	Neelanjana and Chinna Productions	
J U L	12th	Sahasam	Chandra Sekhar Yeleti	Gopichand, Taapsee Pannu, Shakti Kapoor, Suman, Ali	Venkateswara Cine Chitra	
J U L	12th	Pelli Pustakam	Ramakrishna Machakanti	Rahul, Neethi Taylor	Lakshmi Narasimha Cine Visions	
J U L	19th	Om 3D	Sunil Reddy	Nandamuri Kalyan Ram, Kriti Kharbanda, Nikesha Patel	NTR Arts	
J U L	19th	Kevvu Keka	Devi Prasad	Allari Naresh, Sharmila Mandre	Jahnavi Productions	
J U L	20th	Made In Vizag	Kanmani	Yashwin, Nikitha Narayan	Nisha Neha Productions	
J U L	26th	Alias Janaki	Dayaa K	Venkat Rahul, Anisha Ambrose, Nagababu, Tanikella Bharani		
A U G	2nd	Romance	Swamy	Prince, Manasa Himavarsha, Dimple Chopade	Maruthi Media House	
A U G	2nd	Abbai Class Ammai Mass	Koneti Srinu	Varun Sandesh, Hariprriya, Ali	Lakshman Cine Visions	
A U G	9th	Pusthakamlo Konni Pageelu Missing	Sajid Qureshi	Sree, Supraja, Rahul, Satish, Masth Ali	Blockbuster Studio	
A U G	15th	1000 Abaddalu	Teja	Sairam Shankar, Ester Noronha	Sri Productions	
A U G	15th	Jagadguru Adi Shankara	J.K.Bharavi	Nagarjuna, Mohan Babu, Kaushik Babu, Sai Kumar, Srihari, Suman	Nara Jaya Sri Devi & Global Sai Financiers	
A U G	15th	Dalam	Jeevan Reddy	Naveen Chandra, Piaa Bajpai, Abhimanyu Singh, Kishore, Nassar	The Mammoth Media & Entertainment Pvt Ltd	
A U G	15th	Adda	Sai Karthik	Sushanth, Shanvi Srivastava	Sri Nag Corporation	
A U G	23rd	Antaku Mundu Aa Taruvaata	Mohan Krishna Indraganti	Sumanth Ashwin, Eesha	Sri Ranjith Movies	
A U G	23rd	Telisi Teliyaka	K. Jayaprakash	Geethanandh, Maithili, Krishna, Hasini	Amma Arts Creations	
A U G	23rd	Athadu Aame o Scooter	Gangarapu Lakshman	Vennela Kishore, Priyanka Chabra	Pyramid Creations	
A U G	30th	Prema Oka Maikam	Chandu	Rahul, Charmee Kaur, Ravi Babu, Saranya Nag	Touring Talkies	
A U G	30th	Waiting for You	Sunil Kumar Reddy	Sai Anil, Gayathri, Raghu Babu	Sravya Films	
S E P	6th	Toofan	Apoorva Lakhia	Ram Charan Tej, Priyanka Chopra, Prakash Raj, Srihari, Mahie Gill, Tanikella Bharani	Reliance Entertainment; A Hindi - Telugu Bilingual film Remake of Hindi film Zanjeer (1973)	
S E P	13th	Kiss	Adivi Sesh	Adivi Sesh, Priya Banerjee, Bharath Reddy	My Dream Cinema Pvt. Ltd & Thousand Lights Inc.	
S E P	13th	Kamina	Lakshmikanth Chenna	Srihari, Sai Kumar, Roja, Lekha Washington, Brahmaji, Krishi Arimanda, Ashish Vidyarthi	Kubera Cinemas; Remake of Hindi film Johnny Gaddar	
S E P	13th	Naa Sami Ranga	Subramanyam Pachcha	Dilip, Saikumar Pampana, SreeTeja, Yashaswini, Priyanka, Ashish Vidyarthi	Vidhata Films	
S E P	14th	Potugadu	Pavan Wadeyar	Manoj Manchu, Sakshi Chaudhary, Simran Kaur Mundi, Rachel, Anupriya Goenka	Ramalakshmi Cine Creations; Remake of Kannada film Govindaya Namaha	
S E P	20th	Welcome Obama	Singeetham Srinivasa Rao	Urmila Kanitkar, Rachel, Esteban	Sandalwood Media	
S E P	20th	Break Up	Amar Kamepalli	Ranadhir Reddy, Swathi Dikshit, Suresh, Allari Subhashini, Harish	Oasis Entertainment	
S E P	20th	Nirbhaya Bharatham	R. Narayana Murthy	R. Narayana Murthy, Nancy Angel, Spandana, Amarendra, Arif	Sneha Chitra productions	
S E P	20th	Music Magic	Mantraakshar D. S.	Rahul, Trinath, Kimaya, Henna Chopra	Palred Media & Entertainment Pvt. Ltd	
S E P	21st	Barrister Shankar Narayan	N. A. Thara	Raj Kumar, Divya Prabha, Alia Trivedi, Lakshmi, M. S. Narayana	Sri Chowdeswari Devi Pictures	
S E P	27th	Attarintiki Daredi	Trivikram Srinivas	Pawan Kalyan, Samantha Ruth Prabhu, Pranitha, Nadhiya, Boman Irani, Brahmanandam	Sri Venkateswara Cine Creations	
O C T	4th	Police Game	Sahadeva Reddy	Srihari, Neenu Karthika, Kota Srinivasa Rao, Brahmanandam, Jeeva	Deva Productions	
O C T	4th	Sahasra	K. Srikanth	Rajiv Kanakala, Krishnudu, Shafi, Sri Ira, Reva	Sri Sri Productions	
O C T	4th	Gatham	B S Raju	Yuvraraj Sagar, Soumya, Hema, Shwetha, Harsha, Shafir		
O C T	11th	Ramayya Vasthavayya	Harish Shankar	Jr. NTR, Samantha Ruth Prabhu, Shruthi Hassan	Dil Raju	
O C T	17th	Doosukeltha	Veeru Potla	Vishnu Manchu, Lavanya Tripathi, Brahmanandam, Pankaj Tripathi	24 Frames Factory	
O C T	22nd	Kharjooram	GKR	Raj Virat, Geetha Pallavi, Suman, M. S. Chowdary, Tagubothu Ramesh, Chitti Babu, Kanth	Rainbow Pictures	
O C T	25th	Bhai	Veerabhadram Chowdary	Nagarjuna Akkineni, Richa Gangopadhyay, Prasanna, Sonu Sood, Ashish Vidyarthi, Ajay, Rahul Dev, Brahmanandam	Akkineni Nagarjuna	
N O V	1st	Chinni Chinni Aasha	Dr Kiran	Singeetam Srinivasa Rao, Tulasi, Ajay, Aparna Pillai, Dhanya, Rajeev, Inthuri Vasu, Gemini Suresh	Super Cine Entertainments	
N O V	8th	Satya 2	Ram Gopal Varma	Sharwanand, Anaika Soti, Aradhna Gupta, Mahesh Thakur	Mammoth Media And Entertainment Pvt Ltd	
N O V	8th	Chandee	V. Samudra	Priyamani, R. Sarathkumar, Ashish Vidhyarthi, Krishnam Raju	OMICS Creations	
N O V	8th	Nenem...Chinna Pillana?	P. Sunil Kumar Reddy	Rahul Ravindran, Tanvi Vyas, Sanjjanaa, Suman	Suresh Productions	
N O V	8th	Kaalicharan	Praveen Sri	Chaitanya Krishna, Chandini, Pankaj Kesari, Kavitha	Sri Karunalayam Productions	
N O V	15th	Masala	K. Vijaya Bhaskar	Venkatesh, Ram Pothineni, Anjali, Shazahn Padamsee	Suresh Productions	
N O V	15th	Entha Andanga Unnave	S. I. Mahendra	Ajay Manthena, Jiyana, Kasi Viswanath, Sivanarayana	Sri Vignesh Karthik Cinema	
N O V	29th	Venkatadri Express	Merlapaka Gandhi	Sundeep Kishan, Rakul Preet Singh, M. S. Narayana, Brahmaji, Jayaprakash Reddy	Anand Arts Creations	
N O V	29th	Ishta Sakhi	Bharat Parepalli	Varun, Bhaskar, Sriram, Anusmrithi	Manikanta Movie Makers	
D E C	5th	Aadu Magaadra Bujji	Krishnareddy Gangadasu	Sudheer Babu, Asmita Sood, Poonam Kaur	SNR Films India Pvt Ltd. and Colors and Claps Entertainments	
D E C	6th	Prema Ishq Kaadhal	Pavan Sadineni	Harshavardhan Rane, Vishnu Vardhan, Harish, Vithika Sheru, Ritu Varma, Sree Mukhi, Ravi Prakash, Satyam Rajesh	Lucky Media	
D E C	6th	Pranaya Veedhullo	Prabhakar Jaini	Dr. K. V. Ramanachari, Suresh Chandra, Vamshi Krishna, Manaswini, Sri Divya, Arjun	Bagavathe Vasudevaya Films	
D E C	13th	Madhumati	Raaj Sreedhar	Udaya Bhanu, Vishnu Priyan, Siva Kumar, Diksha	Gomatha Arts	
D E C	13th	Second Hand	Kishore Tirumala	Dhanya Balakrishna, Sudheer Verma, Kireeti Damaraju, Vishnuvardhan, Anuj Ram	Sri Sreeyas Chitra	
D E C	14th	Bunny n Cherry	Rajesh Puli	Prince, Mahat Raghavendra, Kriti, Saba, Brahmanandam	Haroon Gani Arts	
D E C	21st	Manushulatho Jagratha	Govinda Varaha	Rajendra Prasad, Naresh		
D E C	25th	D for Dopidi	Siraj Kalla	Varun Sandesh, Sundeep Kishan, Naveen Polishetty, Rakesh Rachakonda, Melanie Kannokada	D2R Films Pvt Ltd, SVC	
D E C	25th	Uyyala Jampala	Virinchi Varma	Raj Tarun, Avika Gor, Punarnavi Bhupalam, Peela Gangadhar	Sunshine Cinemas	
D E C	27th	Biskett	Anil Gopi Reddy	Arvind Krishna, Dimple Chopade		

== Notable deaths ==
Month	Date	Name	Age	Profession	Notable films	Ref.
October	9	Srihari	49	Actor	Simhachalam, Nuvvostanante Nenoddantana, King, Magadheera, Brindavanam, Toofan	
December	7	Dharmavarapu Subramanyam	59	Actor	Nuvvu Nenu, Family Circus, Manmadhudu, Amma Nanna O Tamila Ammayi, Simhadri, Venky, Avunanna Kadanna, Athadu, Ready, Dookudu, Rudramadevi	

== See also ==
- List of Telugu films of 2012
- Lists of Telugu-language films
- List of Telugu films of 2014
