= List of Telugu films of 2012 =

This page provides a list of Telugu-language films produced in the year 2012.

== Box office ==
Highest-grossing films of 2012
Rank	Title	Studio	Worldwide gross	Share	Ref.
1	Gabbar Singh*	Parameswara Arts Productions	₹107−150 crore (equivalent to ₹−283 crore or US$−29 million in 2023) *₹8.01 crore 4K 2024 re release	₹60.55 crore	
2	Eega	Varahi Chalana Chitram	₹115−130 crore (equivalent to ₹−245 crore or US$−25 million in 2023)	₹58.5 crore	
3	Racha	Super Good Films	₹81 crore (equivalent to ₹153 crore or US$16 million in 2023)	₹45 crore	
4	Businessman*	R. R. Makers	₹72 crore (equivalent to ₹136 crore or US$14 million in 2023) *₹5.31 4K 2023 re release	₹44 crore	
5	Julayi	DVV Entertainments	₹70 crore (equivalent to ₹132 crore or US$14 million in 2023)	₹41 crore	
6	Cameraman Gangatho Rambabu	Universal Films	₹60 crore (equivalent to ₹113 crore or US$12 million in 2023)	₹37 crore	
7	Dhammu	Creative Commercials	₹58 crore (equivalent to ₹109 crore or US$11 million in 2023)	₹35 crore	
8	Damarukam	R.R Movie Makers	₹48 crore (equivalent to ₹90 crore or US$9.4 million in 2023)	₹26 crore	
9	Rebel	Sri Balaji Cine Media	₹44 crore (equivalent to ₹83 crore or US$8.6 million in 2023)	₹27.3 crore	
10	Sudigadu	Arundathi Movies	₹43 crore (equivalent to ₹81 crore or US$8.4 million in 2023)	₹22 crore	

== January–June ==
Opening		Title	Director	Cast	Production house	Ref
J A N	6	Bachelors 2	Jakir	Jakir, Avinn, Mahabub bhasha, Rajsekhar, Tripti sharma Ali	Produced by Mariyam Productions	
J A N	12	Bodyguard	Gopichand Malineni	Venkatesh, Trisha Krishnan, Saloni Aswani, Prakash Raj	Produced by Bellamkonda Suresh	
J A N	13	Businessman	Puri Jagannadh	Mahesh Babu, Kajal Aggarwal, Prakash Raj, Nassar, Sayaji Shinde	Produced by R. R. Movie Makers	
J A N	15	Nandeeswarudu	Srinu Yajarala	Taraka Ratna, Sheena Shahabadi, Rajeev Kanakala	Produced by Kota Film Corporation	
J A N	20	Ayyare	Saagar K Chandra	Saagar K Chandra,Rajendra Prasad, Sai Kumar, Sivaji	Produced by Preetham Productions	
F E B	3	Ramadandu	Satish Vegesna	Krishnudu, Soumya, Bharath	Produced by Nava Chitralaya Creations	
F E B	3	Love Cheste	Dhruva Nag	Vishnu, Manjulika, Siddhi Mamre	Produced by Meenakshi Productions	
F E B	4	Alibaba Intlo Andaru Dongale	Neelam K Sekar	V Ramana, Jyothi Lal	Produced by Sri Ramana Films	
F E B	10	Dhoni	Prakash Raj	Prakash Raj, Aakash, Sriteja, Radhika Apte	Produced by Duet Movies	
F E B	10	Rushi	Raj Madiraju	Arvind Krishna, Supriya	Produced by Prasad Productions Pvt. Ltd.	
F E B	10	Siva Manasulo Sruthi	Thathineni Satya	Sudheer Babu, Regina Cassandra	Produced by Vega Entertainment	
F E B	10	Veerangam	Vemuganti	Suman, Shyamala, Ashish Vidyarthi, Kota Srinivasa Rao	Produced by Shivani Arts	
F E B	17	Nippu	Gunasekhar	Ravi Teja, Deeksha Seth	Produced by Bommarillu Productions	
F E B	18	Poola Rangadu	Veerabhadram	Sunil, Isha Chawla, Kota Srinivasa Rao	Produced by Max India Productions	
F E B	24	Ishq	Vikram Kumar	Nitin Reddy, Nithya Menon, Sindhu Tolani	Produced by Multi Dimension Entertainment	
F E B	24	My Heart is Beating	Arun Rudra; Kiran Meegada	Revanth, Rajitha, Rajasekhar, Srini Kolla	Produced by Dharmapada Creations	
M A R	2	10th Class Lo	B. S. Raju	Sai Srinivas, Shipra Gaur	Produced by Sri Aishwarya Movies	
M A R	8	Mr. Nookayya	Ani Kanneganti	Manoj Manchu, Kriti Kharbanda, Sana Khan	Produced by Sri Shailendra Cinemas	
M A R	9	Kulu Manali	Vignesha Satish	Vimala Raman, Krishnudu, Shashank, Archana, Samiksha	Produced by Jahnavi Productions	
M A R	9	Nanda Nanditha	Ramshiva	Surya Pratap, Meghana Raj, Hemachandran, Nassar		
M A R	16	Nuvva Nena	P. Narayana	Allari Naresh, Sharvanand, Shriya Saran, Vimala Raman	Produced by SVK Cinema	
M A R	16	Prema Pilustondi	Ajay Nathani	Balu, Sindhu Menon	Produced by Sri Ganasai Venkateshwara Movies	
M A R	16	Ding Dong Bell	Madhusudan Reddy	Krishnudu, Shweta Prasad, Bhanu Sri Mehra, Sumit Arora	Produced by T. Anupama	
M A R	23	Naa Ishtam	Prakash Toleti	Rana Daggubati, Genelia D'Souza	Produced by United Movies	
M A R	23	Ee Rojullo	Maruthi	Srinivas, Reshma	Produced by Good Cinema Group	
M A R	23	Seeta Weds Sriram	P.S.L	Krishna, Chandra Mohan, Uttej	Produced by Vishaka Talkies	
M A R	30	Lovely	B. Jaya	Aadi, Shanvi	Produced by R. R. Movie Makers	
M A R	30	Balaraju Aadi Bammardi	Rama Krishna	Aryan Rajesh, Srihari, Shraddha Arya	Produced by Sudha Entertainments banner	
A P R	5	Rachcha	Sampath Nandi	Ram Charan Teja, Tamanna Bhatia	Produced by Megaa Super Good Films	
A P R	13	Neeku Naaku Dash Dash	Teja	Prince, Nandita, Teertha, Tanikella Bharani, Banerjee	Produced by Bhavya Creations	
A P R	13	Devasthanam	Janardhana Maharshi	K. Viswanath, S. P. Balasubrahmanyam, Aamani, Kovai Sarala	Produced by Sarve Jana Sukino Bhavanthu Films	
A P R	13	Friends Book	R. P. Patnaik	Nischal, Uday, Archana Sharma, Nisha Shetty, Rao Ramesh, Chalapathi Rao	Produced by Wellfare Creations	
A P R	20	Disco	Hari K Chanduri	Nikhil Siddharth, Sara Sharma, M. S. Narayana	Produced by Style Entertainment	
A P R	20	Nuvvekkadunte Nenakkadunta	Subha Selvam	Uday Kiran, Shweta Basu Prasad, Brahmanandam	Produced by Sri Venkateswaraswami Films	
A P R	20	Maa Oorilo Okasari Emi Jarigindante	Chandu	Kuntal, Sree Siri	Produced by Navya Art Productions	
A P R	21	Anukokunda	Raja Narendra	Shiva, Yogesh, Mythili, Maheshwari	Produced by Shikaram Entertainments	
A P R	27	Dammu	Boyapati Srinu	Jr. NTR, Trisha Krishnan, Karthika, Bhanupriya	Produced by Creative Commercials	
M A Y	11	Gabbar Singh	Harish Shankar	Pawan Kalyan, Shruti Haasan, Abhimanyu Singh, Suhasini Maniratnam	Produced by Parameswara Art Productions	
M A Y	18	Sashesam	Sri Kishore	Vikram Shekar, Supriya	Produced by Green Apple Creations	
M A Y	24	Guruvaram	Vighna Vinayak	Rami Reddy, Suman, Annapoorna, Babu Mohan, Uttej	Produced by Nithya Sri Creations	
M A Y	25	Daruvu	Siva	Ravi Teja, Taapsee Pannu, Prabhu	Produced by Sri Venkateswara Entertainments	
M A Y	25	Yadartha Prema Katha	Charan Raj	Amar, Chiri, Suman Setty, Charan Raj	Produced by C.R. Creations	
J U N	1	Adhinayakudu	Parachuri Murali	Nandamuri Balakrishna, Lakshmi Rai, Sukanya, Saloni Aswani	Produced by Sri Keerthi Creations	
J U N	8	Endukante... Premanta!	A. Karunakaran	Ram, Tamannaah, Richard Rishi, Suman, Sayaji Shinde	Produced by Sri Sri Sravanthi Movies; A Telugu-Tamil Bilingual	
J U N	8	Gandharvulu	Gopal G. Perumall	Sunitha setty, Dhana, Swetha Nair	Produced by Laxshmi Venkata Sai Cinemas	
J U N	9	Naalo Nenu	P. S. Reddy	Sampath Raj, Rohit, Sri	Produced by Panchamukha Hanuman Creations	
J U N	15	Oka Romantic Crime Katha	Sunil Kumar Reddy	Nandam, Sai Anil, Gayatri, Divya Swapna	Produced by Sravya Films	
J U N	15	Maa Abbai Engineering Student	Srinivas Guttula	Naga Siddhartha, Radhika	Produced by Sai Satyajatha Pictures	
J U N	23	Mem Vayasuku Vacham	Trinadha Rao Nakkina	Tanish, Neeti Taylor, Rama Prabha, Mahabub Bhasha	Produced by Lakshman Cine Visions	
J U N	29	All the Best	J. D. Chakravarthy	Srikanth, J. D. Chakravarthy, Lucky Sharma, Kota Srinivasa Rao, Brahmanandam	Produced by Sudha Cinema	

== July–December ==
Opening		Title	Director	Cast	Production house	Ref
J U L	6	Eega	S. S. Rajamouli	Nani, Samantha, Sudeep	Produced by Vaaraahi Chalana Chitram; A Telugu-Tamil Bilingual	
J U L	20	Tuneega Tuneega	M. S. Raju	Sumanth Ashwin, Rhea Chakraborty	Produced by Padmini Arts; Produced by Sri Venkateswara Creations	
J U L	27	Uu Kodathara? Ulikki Padathara?	Sekhar Raja	Nandamuri Balakrishna, Manoj Manchu, Deeksha Seth, Lakshmi Manchu, Sonu Sood	Produced by Manchu Entertainments	
J U L	27	Onamalu	Kranthi Madhav	Rajendra Prasad, Kalyani	Produced by Sunshine Cinema	
A U G	3	Mr. 7	S.R. Charan Reddy	Jr. SVR, Neelam Upadhyay, M. S. Narayana, Srinivasa Reddy	Produced by SVR Cine Corp	
A U G	9	Julayi	Trivikram Srinivas	Allu Arjun, Ileana D'Cruz, Sonu Sood, Rajendra Prasad	Produced by Haarika & Hassine Creations	
A U G	10	Andala Rakshasi	Hanu Raghavapudi	Naveen Chandra, Rahul Ravindran, Lavanya Tripathi	Produced by Vaaraahi Chalana Chitram	
A U G	15	Devudu Chesina Manushulu	Puri Jagannadh	Ravi Teja, Ileana D'Cruz, Prakash Raj, Bramhanandam	Produced by Sri Venkateswara Cine Chitra	
A U G	24	Sudigadu	Bhimaneni Srinivasa Rao	Allari Naresh, Monal Gajjar, Brahmanandam, Ali, M. S. Narayana	Produced by Arundhaty Movies	
A U G	30	Srimannarayana	Ravi Chavali	Nandamuri Balakrishna, Parvati Melton, Isha Chawla	Produced by Yellow Flowers	
S E P	6	Shirdi Sai	K. Raghavendra Rao	Nagarjuna, Srikanth, Kamalinee Mukherjee	Produced by Sai Krupa Entertainments	
S E P	14	Life Is Beautiful	Sekhar Kammula	Shriya Saran, Amala, Anjala Zaveri, Naveen Polishetty, Abhijeet, Sudhakar, Kaushik, Zara, Rashmi, Kavya	Produced by Amigos Creations	
S E P	14	People's War	R. Narayana Murthy	R. Narayana Murthy, Srihari, Posani Krishna Murali	Produced by Sneha Chitra Pictures	
S E P	21	Vennela 1 1/2	Vennela Kishore	Chaitanya Krishna, Monal Gajjar, Vennela Kishore, Brahmanandam	Produced by GR8 Films	
S E P	21	Avunu	Ravi Babu	Poorna, Harshavardhan Rane, Ravi Babu	Produced by Flying Frogs Productions	
S E P	21	Em Babu Laddu Kavala	Gandhi Manohar	Sivaji, Rachana Maurya, Aditi Agarwal, M. S. Narayana, Jeeva	Produced by Vanitha's Dream Line	
S E P	28	Rebel	Raghava Lawrence	Prabhas, Tamannaah, Deeksha Seth, Krishnam Raju, Brahmanandam	Produced by Sri Balaji Cine Chitra	
O C T	5	Housefull	Ajay Bhuyan	Vipin, Gowri Pandit, Vega, Ali, Jeeva	Produced by Filmotsav	
O C T	5	Sorry Teacher	Sri Satya	Kavya Singh, Aryaman	Produced by Suryalok Films Factory	
O C T	12	Railway Station	Krishna Maya	Shiva, Sandeep, Jayanth, Shravani	Produced by Lakshmi Krishna Films	
O C T	18	Cameraman Gangatho Rambabu	Puri Jagannadh	Pawan Kalyan, Tamannaah	Produced by Universal Media	
O C T	24	Denikaina Ready	G.Nageswara Reddy	Vishnu Manchu, Hansika Motwani, Brahmanandam, Roja	Produced by 24 Frames Factory	
O C T	26	Dream	Bhavani Shankar K	Rajendra Prasad, Pavani Reddy, Jayashree, Deepti	Produced by Kaipas Film Production House	
O C T	26	6	Srikanth Lingode	Jagapati Babu, Gayatri Iyer, Satyam Rajesh	Produced by Creative Mind Film Productions	
N O V	1	Lucky	Hari	Srikanth, Meghana Raj, Jayasudha, Roja, Brahmanandam	Produced by Raja Rajeswari Pictures	
N O V	11	Bus Stop	Maruthi	Prince Cecil, Sri Divya, Hasika, Rao Ramesh	Produced by Sri Lakshmi Narasimha Productions	
N O V	16	Yuganiki Okka Premikudu	Akash	Akash, Shweta Basu Prasad, Kota Srinivasa Rao	Produced by Jai Balaji Movie Makers	
N O V	16	Sri Vasavi Vaibhavam	Udaya Bhaskar	Meena, Suhasini, Suman, Sai Kiran	Produced by V. M. C. Combines	
N O V	23	Damarukam	Srinivasa Reddy	Nagarjuna, Anushka Shetty, Panchi Bora, Prakash Raj	Produced by R. R. Movie Makers	
N O V	23	Routine Love Story	Praveen Sattaru	Sundeep Kishan, Regina Cassandra, M. S. Narayana, Vennela Kishore	Produced by Working Dream	
N O V	30	Krishnam Vande Jagadgurum	Krish	Rana Daggubati, Nayantara, Kota Srinivasa Rao, Posani Krishna Murali, L.B. Sriram	Produced by First Frame Entertainment	
N O V	30	Mythri	Surya Raju	Navdeep, Sadha, Brahmanandam, Uttej	Produced by Hanu Cine Creations	
N O V	30	Chanakyudu	G. Srinivas	Tanish, Ishitha, Kota Srinivasa Rao, Chandra Mohan	Produced by Sai Srinivasa Productions	
D E C	7	Devaraya	Nani Krishna	Srikanth, Meenakshi Dixit, Vidisha, Jaya Prakash Reddy	Produced by Sunray International Cinema	
D E C	7	Chaduvukovali	Venkateswara Rao Maddali	Seetha, Baby Annie, Kota Shankar Rao	Produced by Pavan Sai Creations	
D E C	7	Swati I Love You	Santosh Parlawar	Santosh Parlawar, Lasya	Produced by SRP Creations	
D E C	7	Kittigadu	Aditya PC	Vishal Kumar, Sai Kiran, Surekha Vani	Produced by GVK Pictures	
D E C	14	Yeto Vellipoyindhi Manasu	Gautham Vasudev Menon	Nani, Samantha, Krishnudu, Anupama Kumar	Produced by Teja Cinemas	
D E C	14	Yamaho Yama: In America	Y. Jitender	Sairam Shankar, Parvati Melton, Srihari, Sanjjanaa	Produced by GVK Arts	
D E C	21	Sarocharu	Parasuram	Ravi Teja, Kajal Aggarwal, Richa Gangopadhyay, Nara Rohit	Produced by Three Angels Studio	
D E C	21	Midhunam	Tanikella Bharani	S. P. Balasubrahmanyam, Lakshmi	Produced by AMR Productions	
D E C	21	Agnatham	Sridhar Pokuru	Kalyani, Subbaraju, Krishna Bhagavaan, Jeeva	Produced by Sri Kamalalaya Productions	
D E C	27	Yamudiki Mogudu	E. Satti Babu	Allari Naresh, Richa Panai, Sayaji Shinde, Ramya Krishna, Naresh	Produced by Friendly Movies	
D E C	28	Ko Antey Koti	Anish Yohan Kuruvilla	Sharwanand, Priya Anand, Sri Hari	Produced by Sarvaa Arts	
D E C	28	Genius	Anchor Omkar	Havish, Sanusha, R. Sarathkumar, Abhinaya	Produced by Ramadhootha Creations	

== See also ==
- List of Telugu films of 2011
- Lists of Telugu-language films
- List of Telugu films of 2013
