= Prema Katha Chitram 2 =

Indian film by Hari Kishan

- Theatrical release poster
- Directed by: Hari Kishan
- Written by: Chandrasekhar
- Produced by: R. Sudharshan Reddy
- Starring: Sumanth Ashwin; Nandita Swetha
- Cinematography: C. Ramprasad
- Edited by: S. B. Uddhav
- Music by: Jeevan Babu
- Release date: 6 April 2019
- Country: India
- Language: Telugu

Prema Katha Chitram 2 is a 2019 Telugu-language horror comedy film written and directed by Hari Kishan and produced by R. Sudarshan Reddy. It is a sequel to the 2013 film Prema Katha Chitram directed by J Prabhakar Reddy and Maruthi but with a different cast continuing the roles. The film stars Sumanth Ashwin and Nandita Swetha. The movie was released on 6 April 2019. The Hindi dubbing rights for the film sold for 1.5 Crore.

== Plot ==
After the incident of Lakshmi in the first film, Sudheer and Nandu fell in love. On Nandu's condition, Sudheer and Nandu decided to keep their relationship secret. Sudheer had come to college to finish his studies where Sudheer quarreled with Bindu. Sudheer attends college and runs a dance academy part time. Bindu eventually falls in love with Sudheer and joins Sudheer's dance academy to impress him. Bindu throws a party and confess her love for Sudheer in front of everyone. Sudheer rejects Bindu's proposal. After a while, strange things happen in a farm house where Sudheer is staying. Sudheer invites his friend Bablu to the farm house. Sudheer and Bablu notice supernatural events around Nandu. Sudheer tells Bablu about Nandu. Sudheer and Bablu understand that Nandu is possessed by an angry Ghost. The ghost prevents Sudheer from being with Nandu and threatens to kill Nandu. Sudheer devices a plan to identify the Ghost. The Ghost is revealed to be Chitra from the previous film. Sudheer and Bablu visit Chitra's house and find that Chitra and Anita are friends. Sudheer and Bablu visit their friend Anita and Anita reveals that Bindu died by suicide. Sudheer asks Anita about Chitra and Anita reveals that Chitra died on her wedding day by suicide. Sudheer, Bablu and Anita arrive at the farm house. Chitra says that at the time of marriage, Sudheer calls off the wedding as Sudheer knows that Chitra's Character. Bindu, sister of one of Chitra's ex boyfriends, arrive at the wedding to expose Chitra's character in front of her father and other relatives. Chitra's father ashamed by Chitra's character dies from a heart attack. After seeing her father dead, Chitra commits suicide and possess Bindu. Chitra after possessing Bindu tries to make Sudheer love Bindu and tries to separate Nandu from Sudheer but Sudheer rejected Bindu's proposal and Nandu doesn't leave Sudheer. After her plan fails, Chitra kills Bindu and possess Nandu. Chitra possess Sudheer and tries to kill Nandu. Sudheer decide to sacrifice himself for Nandu as she is innocent and unaware of the facts. Chitra possess Nandu and stabs Sudheer and leaves Nandu. Bablu and Anita admit Sudheer and Nandu in a hospital. Anita explains everything to Nandu. Nandu visits Sudheer but Chitra possess Nandu again. Chitra apologises to Sudheer for her foolish acts and says that she understood what real love is and leaves Nandu.

== Cast ==
- Sumanth Ashwin as Sudheer
- Nandita Swetha as Nandu
- Siddhi Idnani as Bindu
- Apoorva Srinivasan as Chitra
- Prabhas Sreenu as a Police constable
- Vidyullekha Raman as Anita
- Krishna Teja as Bablu
- NTV Sai

== Soundtrack ==
Prema Katha Chitram 2

Soundtrack album by Jeevan Babu
- Released: 26 February 2019
- Genre: Feature film soundtrack
- Length: 16:13
- Language: Telugu
- Label: Aditya Music
External audio
- Audio Jukebox on YouTube

The soundtrack is composed by Jeevan Babu and lyrics by Ananth Sriram, Kasarla Shyam and Purnachari.

Track list
No.	Title	Lyrics	Singer(s)	Length
1.	"Naa Kallu Chusedhi"	Kasarla Shyam	Satya Yamini	4:15
2.	"Merupula Merisina"	Ananth Sriram	Rahul Sipligunj, Ramya Behara	4:09
3.	"Aakashamantha"	Purnachari	Hymath & Ramya Behara	3:46
4.	"First Time Heart beat"	Purnachari	P V N S Rohit	4:03
Total length:				16:13
