= Venu Yeldandi =

Indian film director, screenwriter and actor

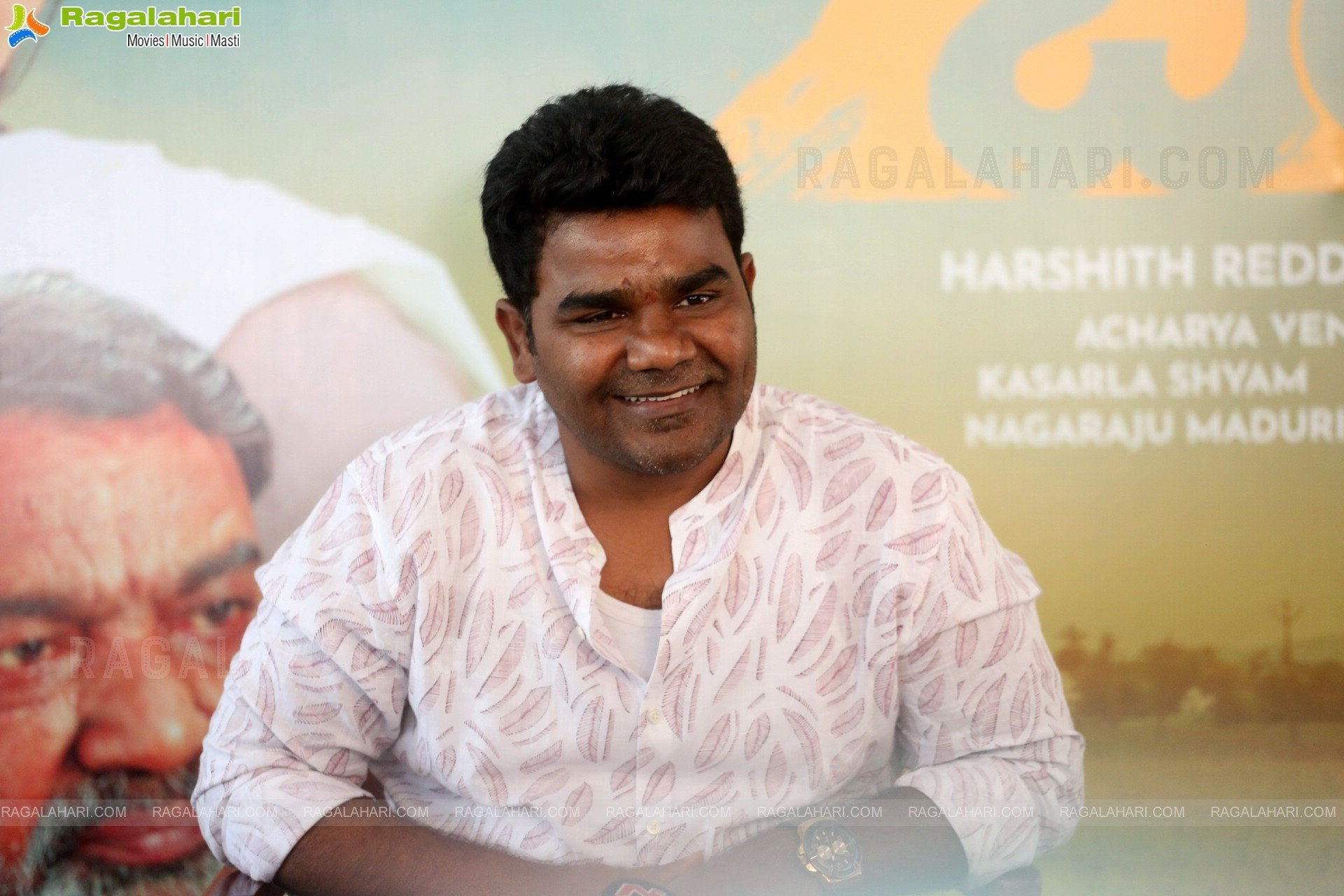
- Yeldandi in 2024
- Born: Siricilla, Andhra Pradesh, India (now in Telangana, India)
- Other names: Venu Tillu, Jai Venu, Nalla Venu
- Occupations: Actor; Director
- Years active: 2004–present

Venu Yeldandi is an Indian actor and director who works in Telugu cinema. He made his acting debut with Jai (2004) and directorial debut with Balagam (2023) for which he won the Filmfare Award for Best Director – Telugu.

== Career ==
He worked as a junior artist in many films for small roles as a comedian starting with Jai (2004). His first major role was in Munna (2007) as Tillu. He also was a part of the comedy television series Jabardasth.

In 2014, during filming of the series, Yelandi and his team were attacked by a group who were offended by the portrayal of their caste in the scenes being filmed. The police arrested Yeldandi and others involved. Both Venu and the community leaders lodged official complaints, each claiming the other party was at fault. Yelandi was charged under Section 509 (insulting the modesty of a woman) and 323 (causing hurt), while members of the community who attacked the group were charged under Section 341 (wrongful restraint).

He worked as a ghost writer for Rudhramadevi (2015) and Jai Lava Kusa (2017).

Yelandi's directorial debut was with his film Balagam.

== Filmography ==
=== As an actor ===
Year	Title	Role(s)	Notes and Ref.
2004	Jai	Jai's friend	
2005	Dhairyam	Prakash	
2006	Ranam	Bhagawati's henchmen	
2006	Kedi	Raghu's friend	Tamil film
2006	Seethakoka Chiluka		
2007	Jagadam	Nalla Mahesh	
2007	Munna	Tillu	
2007	Takkari	Tirupathi's friend	
2007	FM Fun Aur Masti	Beggar	Deccani film
2007	Godava	College student	
2008	Kantri		
2008	Kathanayakudu		
2008	Siddu from Sikakulam	Dose Babu	
2008	Adivishnu		
2008	Ankit, Pallavi & Friends	Sunil	
2008	Dongala Bandi		
2008	King	Bottu Seenu's henchman	
2009	Kurradu	Auto Kumar	
2010	Seeta Ramula Kalyanam Lankalo	Chandu's friend	
2010	Sadhyam	Security guard	
2010	Maro Charitra	Balu and Sandhya's coworker	
2010	Young India	Mr. Jaffa	
2010	Don Seenu	Bar waiter	
2010	Baava	Veerababu's friend	
2010	Kathi Kantha Rao	Nalla Sreenu	
2011	Parama Veera Chakra		
2011	Naaku O Lovervundi		
2011	Pilla Zamindar	Bangkok	
2012	Neeku Naaku Dash Dash	Bapineedu's sidekick	
2012	Daruvu		
2012	Sudigadu	Auto driver	
2012	Vennela 1½		
2012	Lucky	Lucky's friend	
2012	Genius		
2013	Donga Police		
2013	Jabardasth	Dance master	
2013	Jaffa	Venu Bongula	
2013	Shadow	Drunkard	
2013	Sukumarudu	Drama troupe member	
2013	Gurudu		
2013	Romance		
2013	1000 Abaddalu	Satya's friend	
2013	Adda		
2013	Attarintiki Daredi	Sashi's kidnapper	
2013	Madhumati		
2014	Race Gurram	Drunkard	
2014	Billa Ranga		
2014	Galata		
2014	Maine Pyar Kiya	Naveen's friend	
2014	Ra Ra Krishnayya		
2014	Alludu Seenu	Lungi Baba's friend	
2014	Maaya	Bujji	
2014	Boochamma Boochodu		
2014	Dikkulu Choodaku Ramayya		
2014	The End	Watchman	
2014	Lakshmi Raave Maa Intiki		
2015	Beeruva		
2015	Ranam 2		
2015	Tiger	Tiger's friend	
2015	Mantra 2		
2015	Mirchi Lanti Kurradu		
2015	Kick 2		
2015	Bruce Lee: The Fighter	Bruce Lee's friend	
2015	Bhale Manchi Roju	Eesu	
2016	Soggade Chinni Nayana		
2016	Sardaar Gabbar Singh		
2016	Okka Ammayi Thappa		
2016	Babu Bangaram		
2017	Kittu Unnadu Jagratha	Rechukka's henchman	
2017	Lanka	Moscow	
2017	Nakshatram		
2017	Lie	Thief	
2017	Mahanubhavudu		
2017	Gulf	Somulu	
2017	Prematho Mee Karthik		
2018	Raa Raa		
2018	Brand Babu	Diamond Babu's assistant	
2018	Nannu Dochukunduvate	Giri	
2018	Anaganaga O Premakatha		
2019	4 Letters		
2019	Okate Life	Vicky	
2019	Seven	Karthik's coworker	
2019	Vajra Kavachadhara Govinda		
2019	Rajdooth	Donka	
2020	Wife, I	Varma's friend	
2021	Drushyam 2	Auto driver	
2022	Chor Bazaar		
2023	Balagam	Narsi	Also director
2023	Ranga Maarthaanda		
2023	Nireekshana	Cheenu	Only dubbed version released
2023	Bhola Shankar	Shankar's friend	
2024	Darling	Baba	

=== As director ===
Year	Title	Notes
2023	Balagam	Won—Filmfare Award for Best Director – Telugu
2026	Yellamma	

=== As producer ===
- Bhagyanagara Veedhullo Gammattu (2019; co-producer)

=== Television ===
Year	Work	Role	Network
2013	Jabardasth	Various	ETV
2023	Save the Tigers	Raghava	Disney+ Hotstar
