= Neetho =

Neetho may refer to:

- Neetho (2002 film)
- Neetho (2022 film)
