= Reshma Rathore =

Indian actress and model

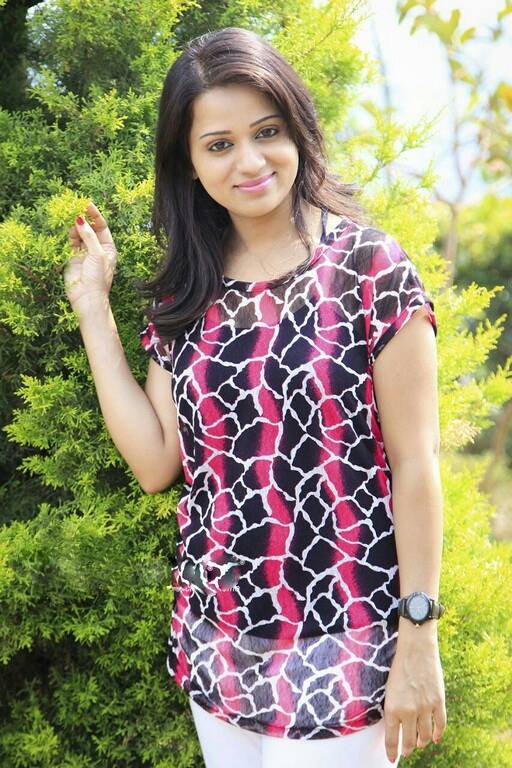
- Education: Bachelor of Law
- Occupations: Film Actress, Model
- Years active: 2012–present

Reshma Rathore is an Indian actress and model who appears predominantly in Telugu-language films.

== Early life and education ==
Reshma Rathore was born in Yellandhu, Bhadradri Kothagudem district, to Shri Haridas Rathore who is working as a Deputy Superintending Mining Engineer in Singareni Collieries Company, Godavarikhani and late Smt. Radha Bai Rathore, who is a High Court lawyer. She secured an admission at Kakatiya University to pursue a Bachelor of Law degree in Warangal. She has one younger brother, Prithviraj Rathore, who is doing Bachelor of Medicine, Bachelor of Surgery.

== Career ==
Reshma Rathore started her film career started with Bodyguard, in which she played Trisha's friend's role, thereafter she made her debut with Ee Rojullo, directed by Maruthi. Her acting was appreciated by Dasari Narayana Rao. In Jai Sriram platinum disc function Dasari Narayana Rao said "I like Reshma's performance in Ee Rojullo very much, she is very simple girl & will be a very successful in full actress" in Telugu film industry. Ee Rojullo was successful at the box office completing 175 days on 13 September 2012, 365 days on 23 March 2013. She got CineMAA Awards for Ee Rojullo and also was nominated for 2nd South Indian International Movie Awards for best female debutant for Ee Rojullo.

Thereafter she did films like Jai Sriram with hero Uday Kiran, Love Cycle, Jeelakarabellam, Pratighatana with Tammareddy Bharadwaja. In the film, Prathighatana (a socio-political thriller), she plays the role of a rape victim.

== Political career ==
Reshma took a break from acting in 2018 and entered politics. She joined in BJP on April 14 AmbedkarJayanthi and currently works as a youth leader in youth wing (BJYM). In an interview with Times of India she said the reason behind her political entry is to establish Bayyaram steel factory which gives self employment for thousands of local youth. "This region is known for its natural resources, but we need to tap them".

== Awards ==
Year	Award	Category	Movie	Result
2012	CineMAA Awards	Best Confident Face of The Year	Ee Rojullo	Won
2012	2nd South Indian International Movie Awards	Best Female Debutant	Ee Rojullo	Nominated

== Filmography ==
Year	Film	Role	Language	Notes
2012	Bodyguard	Keerthi's friend	Telugu	
2012	Ee Rojullo	Shreya	Telugu	
2013	Jai Sreeram	R. Reshma	Telugu	
2013	Love Cycle	Sharanya	Telugu	
2014	Pratighatana	Shanthi	Telugu	
2015	Appavum Veenjum	Jala Fernandez	Malayalam	
2016	Jeelakarra Bellam	Mithili	Telugu	
2017	Adhagappattathu Magajanangalay	Shruthi	Tamil	
