= Chandralekha (2014 film) =

- Film poster
- Directed by: Om Prakash Rao
- Written by: M. S. Ramesh
- Story by: Maruthi
- Based on: Prema Katha Chitram by Maruthi
- Produced by: Kalakonda Vumma Sridhar Reddy
- Starring: Chiranjeevi Sarja; Shanvi Srivastava
- Cinematography: N. Ravikumar
- Edited by: Lakshman Reddy
- Music by: Jeevan Babu
- Production company: S. M. Productions
- Distributed by: Ramu enterprises
- Release date: 7 March 2014
- Running time: 160 minutes
- Country: India
- Language: Kannada

Chandralekha is 2014 Kannada language horror comedy film directed by Om Prakash Rao, starring Chranjeevi Sarja and Shanvi, while Sadhu Kokila plays a supporting role in the movie. The film is the Kannada remake of the Telugu film Prema Katha Chitram (2013) and released with positive reviews.

== Plot ==
People staying at a resort find terrifying things happening around them. Several people decide to commit suicide at a remote resort.

The movie starts with Sudheer Babu, Praveen, and Nanditha planning a combined and flawless suicide because of failures in their respective lives. First, they try to fulfill their last wishes before leaving this world. Nanditha wants to steal a new car and Sudheer wants to slap the local MLA in his own house. After stealing a new car and slapping the local MLA, the trio flees to a nearby resort giving the police a slip. At the resort, the car is stolen and the trio enters the resort to have some food. There Saptagiri, yet another suicide aspirant joins them and the four reach the farmhouse. There, Praveen and Nanditha, who is in love with Sudheer, plan to postpone their suicide for three days so that they can prevent Sudheer from killing himself due to failure in love.

Their plan turns successful and in that interval of three days, all the four get close to each other. Sudheer develops feelings for Nanditha but hesitates to tell her for fear of being humiliated by her. At the end of the third day, Praveen asks Nanditha to kiss Sudheer to divert from death, per male psychology. He meanwhile asks Sudheer to kiss Nanditha as she wants to experience her first kiss before dying to which Sudheer accepts with shame and shyness. As he tries to kiss her, a ghost enters the body of Nanditha, who forces Sudheer out of there. A flabbergasted Sudheer runs out of the room. Whenever Nanditha shows her feelings to Sudheer and Sudheer reacts to it by hugging or touching her, the ghost enters her body and scares Sudheer away. Unaware of the ghost's entry into her body, Nanditha grew depressed.

That night Sudheer learns about Nanditha. Nanditha, a hotel management student, falls for Sudheer, her neighbor. Sudheer never observes her and his intimacy with another girl leads Nanditha to plan to propose to Sudheer at any cost. Praveen, who wants to prevent Sudheer from committing suicide, uses this opportunity and plans the combined suicide. Thus the four are aware that they are not going to die. When Praveen hears Sudheer describing Nanditha as a ghost, he rushes to Nanditha's room to scold her and ask for an apology to Sudheer, only to see the ghost enter her body and thrash him. That night, Saptagiri too experiences the ghost's fury at its villainous best. The trio decides to distance themselves from her and always stay together.

From the next morning, they try to get the ghost to vacate Nanditha's body only to earn the wrath of the ghost. After Nanditha learns about the ghost's presence in her, she too accompanies the trio to escape from there, in vain. Nanditha, who observes Sudheer avoiding her to escape the wrath of the ghost, gets deeply hurt and depressed, resulting in a suicide attempt by slitting her wrist. Three rich men enter the farmhouse who permit the four to stay there. One of them is the owner of the farmhouse. Sudheer reaches Nanditha but in turn, is requested to kill those three by the ghost. Sudheer asks her the reason for vengeance, and the ghost narrates her story to the trio.

The ghost is Lakshmi, a newly married girl who enters the farmhouse with her husband for their first night. There these three drunk men break the boy's head with a champagne bottle and rape the girl. The boy dies after being impaled accidentally and drowning in the swimming pool. Then those three men bury her nearby. Sudheer, Praveen, and Saptagiri kill them. The ghost leaves Nanditha's body. The trio takes her to a nearby hospital, where Sudheer donates blood to her. She gains consciousness, and the movie ends with Saptagiri and Praveen watching the couple hugging each other.

== Cast ==
- Chiranjeevi Sarja as Chandu
- Shanvi Srivastava as Aishwarya
- Sadhu Kokila
- Nagashekar
- Abhishek Prasad
- Prashanth Siddi
- Hari das as Resort Watchman
- Anantha velu
- Tumkur Mohan
- Omprakash Rao

== Soundtrack ==
The music was composed by J.B. and released by Aditya Music.

Chandralekha

Soundtrack album by J.B.
- Released: Dec 9, 2013
- Recorded: 2013
- Genre: Soundtrack
- Length: 22:26
- Label: Aditya Music
- Producer: J.B.

Track list
No.	Title	Lyrics	Singer(s)	Length
1.	"I Just Love You Baby"	Arasu	Revanth, Lipsika	3:56
2.	"Noode Swamy"	Kaviraj	Rahul Sipligunj	3:22
3.	"Preeethi Maina"	Arasu	Karthik, Malavika	4:28
4.	"Oh My Love"	Kaviraj	Lipisika	4:39
5.	"Kaadhiruve"	Jayanth Kaikini	Deepu, Ramya NSK	4:49
6.	"Chandralekha - Theme (Instrumental Version)"		Instrumental	1:12
Total length:				22:26

== Reception ==
=== Critical response ===
A critic from The Times of India scored the film at 3 out of 5 stars and says "While Chiranjeevi Sarja does justice to his challenging role as a dejected lover, Shanvi Srivastav delivers an equally impressive performance. Nagashekara and Sadhu Kokila bring some comic relief. V Ravi Kumar’s work with the camera is remarkable". Shyam Prasad S from Bangalore Mirror wrote "Nagshekar and Sadhu Kokila manage to make the film worth all the trouble. The music and cinematography do not add much value but are not bad either. There are enough power-packed scenes in the second half that make the ticket price worthwhile". B S Srivani from Deccan Herald wrote "Chiranjeevi Sarja would do a LOT better if he kicks his smoking habit, sheds weight, shaves his beard and works hard at dialogue delivery. Inserting a song towards the end also pulls the film down. Chandralekha is strictly for brainless masti".
