= Sankarabharanam =

Sankarabharanam may refer to:

- Sankarabharanam (1980 film), an Indian Telugu-language musical drama film
- Sankarabharanam (2015 film), an Indian Telugu-language crime comedy film
- Sankarabharanam (raga), a rāga in Carnatic music
