= The American Dream (film) =

2022 film by Dr. Vighnesh Koushik

- Official poster
- Directed by: Dr. Vighnesh Koushik
- Written by: Dr. Vighnesh Koushik
- Produced by: Dr. Pradeep Reddy
- Starring: Prince Cecil; Neha Krishna
- Cinematography: Adam Chapman; Abhiraj Nair
- Edited by: Sasank Vupputuri
- Music by: Abhinay TJ
- Release date: 14 January 2022
- Running time: 113 minutes
- Country: India
- Language: Telugu

The American Dream is a 2022 Indian Telugu-language drama thriller film written and directed by Dr. Vighnesh Koushik. Produced by Dr. Pradeep Reddy, the film features Prince Cecil and Neha Krishna in lead roles. The film premiered on 14 January 2022 on the streaming service Aha.

== Cast ==
- Prince Cecil as Rahul Dharanikota
- Neha Krishna as Riya Varma (Voice dubbed by Manisha Eerabathini)
- Subhalekha Sudhakar as Rahul's father
- Raviteja Mukkavalli
- Sri Mirajkar
- Phani Rampalli
- Anil Sankaramanch
- Sri Ram Reddy
- Asireddy
- Muralidhar Goud
- Ravi Kumar Marka
- Jed Brian

== Soundtrack ==
All music is composed by Abhinay TJ.

No.	Title	Lyrics	Singer(s)	Length
1.	"Dhulateerinda"	Aditya Iyengar	Harshika Gudi	3:40
2.	"It's Not A Love Story"	Prudhvi Chandra and Abhinay TJ	Prudhvi Chandra	2:35
Total length:				6:15

== Reception ==
Thadhagath Pathi of The Times of India gave rating of 3 out of 5 and wrote that "The only gripe one can find with American Dream is that it is much darker than what it seems. But if one is ready for it, the film won't disappoint". Another reviewer opined that the film makes an okay watch as the backdrop of the US and relatable situations connect with the audiences.
