= Apoorva Srinivasan =

Indian actress

- Occupations: Model; Actress; pilot
- Years active: 2012-present
- Notable work: Temper

Apoorva Srinivasan is an Indian actress who works primarily in Telugu-language films. She is also a pilot. She is known for her roles in Temper (2015) and Jyothi Lakshmi (2015).

== Career ==
In 2012, she won the Hyderabad Times Fresh Face contest and subsequently received several film offers including the Telugu-language film Temper (2015). She also played a supporting role opposite Priyadarshi Pulikonda in Tholi Prema (2018). She starred in the web series Chithram Vichitram on Zee5. She made her lead and Kannada debut with Randhawa (2019).

== Filmography ==
- All films are in Telugu, unless otherwise noted.

Year	Film	Role	Notes	Ref
2015	Temper	Deepthi	Debut film	
2015	Jyothi Lakshmi	Sravani		
2016	Ekkadiki Pothavu Chinnavada	Nithya's sister		
2017	Winner	Lakshmi		
2018	Tholi Prema	Kavita		
2018	Kavacham	Vaishnavi		
2019	Prema Katha Chitram 2	Chitra		
2019	Ayogya	Bhavani	Tamil film	
2019	Randhawa		Kannada film	
2022	Neetho			

== Web series ==
Year	Film	Role	Language	Platform	Notes	Ref
2018	Chitra Vichitram	Chitra	Telugu	ZEE5	web debut	

== Awards and nominations ==
- 1st IIFA Utsavam - Performance In A Supporting Role - Female - Temper - Nominated
