= Bus Stop (2012 film) =

Bus stop
- Directed by: Maruthi
- Written by: Maruthi
- Produced by: Bellamkonda Suresh
- Starring: Prince Cecil; Sri Divya; Anandhi; Sai Kumar P Rao Ramesh
- Cinematography: J. Prabhakar Reddy
- Edited by: S. B. Uddhav
- Music by: Jeevan Babu; Anil R.
- Distributed by: Sri Lakshmi Narasimha Productions Pvt Ltd
- Release date: 11 November 2012
- Running time: 139 minute
- Country: India
- Language: Telugu

Bus Stop is a 2012 Indian Telugu-language romantic drama film directed by Maruthi, starring Prince Cecil and Sri Divya. The film was produced was by Bellamkonda Suresh and J.B. produced the music. The movie was released on 11 November 2012 after facing a censor delay. The film was a commercial success.

== Cast ==
- Prince as Seenu
- Sri Divya as Shailaja
- Sai Kumar Pampana as Muthu
- Khanna as Khanna
- Anandhi as Seema
- Abhi
- Gopal Sai
- Rao Ramesh
- Koteswara Rao
- Madhavi

== Soundtrack ==
Bus Stop
- Album cover

Soundtrack album by Jeevan Babu Anil R.
- Released: 14 October 2012
- Recorded: 2012
- Genre: Film soundtrack
- Label: Aditya Music
- Producers: Jeevan Babu; Anil R.

Jeevan Babu Anil R. chronology
| Ee Rojullo (2012) | Bus Stop (2012) | Prema Katha Chithram (2013) |

Jeevan Babu and Anil R. composed the music. The audio got good response from critics.

| # | Title | Composer | Lyricist | Singers |
|---|---|---|---|---|
| 1 | "Title Song" | J.B. | Maruthi | Revanth, Sudha Jeevan |
| 2 | "Kalalake Kanulochina" | J.B. | Kasarla Shyam | Revanth |
| 3 | "I Love You" | Anil R | Bhaskarabhatla | Rahul |
| 4 | "Rekkalochina Prema" | Anil R | Veturi | Karthik |
| 5 | "Pattuko Pattuko" | Anil R | Veturi | Chinna Ponnu |
| 6 | "Theme Music" | J.B. | | Instrumental |

== Critical reception ==
Karthik Pasupulate of The Times of India rated the film 3/5 and praised the performances of the cast and the music. Rediff.com gave a review stating "Bus Stop is an urban take on what love means to different people just time-pass or a commitment or just fun. Whatever it is, the urban youth could connect with Bus Stop."
