= Dimple Chopade =

Indian actress

- Born: Pune, Maharashtra, India
- Other names: Dimple Chopda, Dimple Chopra
- Occupation: Actress
- Years active: 2011–2016

Dimple Chopade is an Indian actress. She acts in Telugu, Kannada, and Tamil films.

== Early life ==
She was born in Pune, India and graduated in Symbiosis International University, Pune. She has learnt horse riding and the Mallakhamb.

== Career ==
She tried her hand at Marathi theatre after doing a short course in film making from the Film and Television Institute of India (FTII) in Pune. At the age of 18, she was cast in the Kannada film Sihi Muthu; however, the project was ultimately shelved and never released. Her official film debut came with the Kannada movie Kote in 2011.

She made her foray in Tamil, with a film called Yaaruda Mahesh, which had Sundeep Kishan in the lead. She had worked with Mohan in the Kannada film Nanthara.

== Filmography ==
Year	Film	Role	Language	Notes
2011	Kote		Kannada	Credited as Dimple Chopra
2013	Yaaruda Mahesh	Sindhiya	Tamil	
2013	Romance	Anu	Telugu	
2013	Shathru		Kannada	
2013	Sihi Muthu		Kannada	Shelved
2014	Biskett	Deeksha	Telugu	
2014	Green Signal	Meera	Telugu	
2014	Kalkandu	Karthika	Tamil	
2015	Tungabhadra	Gowri	Telugu	
2016	Krishnashtami	Priya	Telugu	
