= Kali (2024 film) =

2024 Indian Telugu-language film by Siva Sashu

- Theatrical release poster
- Directed by: Siva Sashu
- Written by: Siva Sashu
- Produced by: T. Leela Gowtham Varma
- Starring: Prince Cecil; Naresh Agastya; Neha Krishna
- Cinematography: Nishanth Katari; Ramana Jagarlamudi
- Edited by: Vijay Vardhan Kavuri
- Music by: Jeevan Babu
- Production company: Rudra Creations
- Release date: 4 October 2024
- Running time: 90 minutes
- Country: India
- Language: Telugu

Kali is a 2024 Indian Telugu-language psychological fantasy film written and directed by Siva Sashu. The film features Prince Cecil, Naresh Agastya and Neha Krishnan in lead roles.

The film was released on 4 October 2024.

== Cast ==
- Prince Cecil as Sivaram
- Naresh Agastya as Kali
- Neha Krishnan as Vedha
- Gautam Raju
- Gundu Sudarshan
- Kedar Shankar
- C. V. L. Narasimha Rao as Vedha's father
- Manichandana
- Madhu Mani
- Thrinadh

== Music ==
The background score and soundtrack were composed by Jeevan Babu.

All music is composed by Jeevan Babu.

Track listing
No.	Title	Lyrics	Singer(s)	Length
1.	"Hello Hello"	Ramajogayya Sastry	Hymath Mohammed, Aditi Bhavaraju	3:33
2.	"Pranam Leni Nee Payanam"	Siva Sashu	Mohana Bhogaraju	2:47
Total length:				6:21

== Release ==
Kali was released on 4 October 2024. Post-theatrical digital streaming rights were acquired by ETV Win and was premiered on 17 October 2024.

== Reception ==
Aditya Devulapally of Cinema Express gave a mixed review stating that "Ultimately, while Kali deserves recognition for its daring experimentation, it’s hard to ignore its shortcomings. For all its creative madness, the film remains more of an intriguing effort than a fully realised success". NTV gave a rating of 2.7 out of 5 and praised the director's work, Jeevan Babu's background score and production design. ABP Desam echoed the same and gave a rating of 2.5 out of 5, while particularly praising Jeevan Babu for his work in background score and the performance of lead cast.
