= Shathru (2013 film) =

- Directed by: JK
- Written by: Melvin
- Produced by: M D Prakash; B S Anand; Arun Devashya
- Starring: Prem; Dimple Chopade
- Cinematography: Mathew Rajan; G S V Seetharam
- Edited by: K M Prakash
- Music by: Sujeet Shetty
- Release date: 30 August 2013
- Country: India
- Language: Kannada

Shathru is a 2013 Indian Kannada-language film directed by JK, starring Prem and Dimple Chopade in lead roles.

== Cast ==
- Prem as Vijay Surya
- Dimple Chopade
- Rangayana Raghu
- Sharath Lohitashwa as Adisesha
- Ramesh Bhat
- Bullet Prakash
- Tabla Nani
- Suresh Mangalore as an honest constable

== Music ==
Shathru (ಶತ್ರು)

Soundtrack album by Sujeet Shetty
- Released: 2013
- Recorded: 2013
- Genre: Feature film soundtrack
- Length: 16:17
- Language: Kannada

Official audio
- Shathru - Full Album on YouTube

Track listing
No.	Title	Singer(s)	Length
1.	"Ee Manjali"	Kushboo Jain	4:49
2.	" Galla Galla"	Kushboo Jain	4:06
3.	"Maya Maya"	Nanditha, Rajesh Krishnan	4:16
4.	"Silentaagi"	Jassie Gift	3:46
Total length:			16:17

== Reception ==
The Times of India scored the film at 3 out of 5 stars and wrote "Prem, known for romantic and soft roles, shines even in police officer’s role. Dimple Chopra has nothing much to do. Suresh Mangalore impresses you with honest constable’s role. Music by Sujith Shetty and camera by Mathew Rajan and GNV Seetharam are okay". Sify wrote" Dimple Chopde adds to the glamour quotient of the movie. However, she has been completely wasted as an actress. As usual, Rangayana Raghu and Sharath Lohitashwa excel in their roles. Music by Arjun Janya does not live up to the expectations. The songs are forgettable". Bangalore Mirror wrote "To justify the ugly side of the baddie, there are a few murders and rapes. Cliches crop up at regular intervals, like the character of a lunatic who runs around the village revealing all the secrets of the villain. However, the film is a welcome change for Prem who has long been stuck in stereotypical roles as a lover boy. He does not disappoint, but the film does, to a large extent".
