= Tungabhadra (film) =

- Theatrical release poster
- Directed by: Srinivasa Krishna
- Produced by: Sai Korrapati
- Starring: Adith Arun; Dimple Chopade; Sathyaraj
- Cinematography: Rahul Srivasatav
- Music by: Hari Gaura
- Production company: Varahi Chalana Chitram
- Release date: 20 March 2015
- Country: India
- Language: Telugu

Tungabhadra is a 2015 Indian Telugu-language romantic comedy-action film directed by Srinivasa Krishna and produced under Varahi Chalana Chitram banner. The film features Adith Arun and Dimple Chopade in the lead roles along with Sathyaraj, Charandeep and Ravi Varma in the key supporting roles. The film was released worldwide on 20 March 2015.

== Cast ==
- Adith Arun as Sreenu
- Dimple Chopade as Gowri
- Sathyaraj as Ramaraju
- Charandeep as Thrimurtulu
- Kota Srinivasa Rao as Paiditalli
- Ravi Varma
- Saptagiri
- Chalapathi Rao
- Pavitra Lokesh
- Getup Srinu as Sreenu's friend
- Kalpa Latha

== Reception ==
The film had a low profile release and received mixed-to-negative reviews from APHerald.com, amongst other sites. A critic from The Hans India wrote that "Directed by new comer, Srinivas Krishna, Tungabadhra is portrayed an intense political drama with a sensible love story. Execution of the movie comes across beautifully although the script becomes too predictable post interval".
