= Mahat Raghavendra =

Indian actor

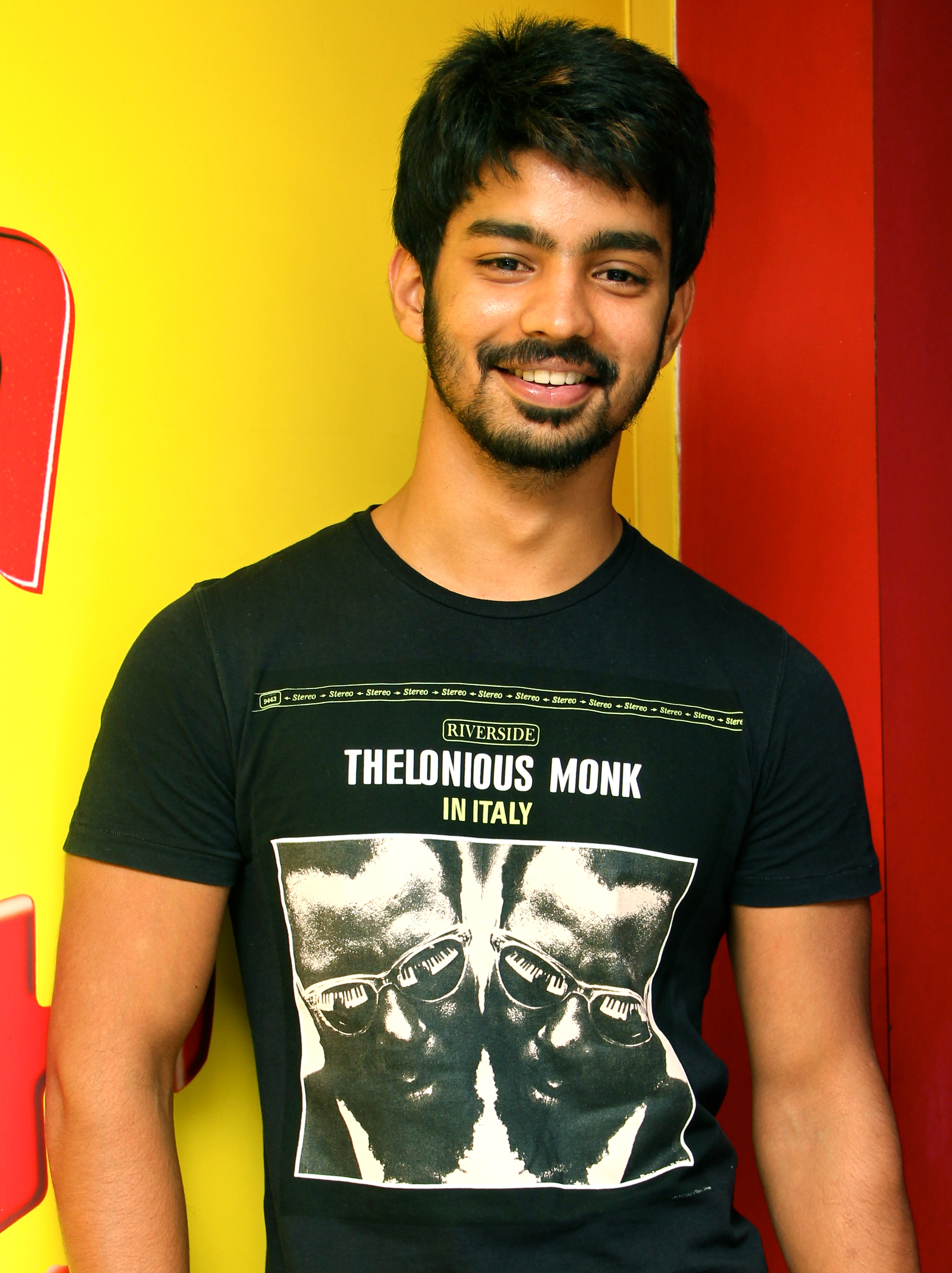
- Born: 18 February 1987 (age 39); Mumbai, Maharashtra, India
- Education: Hindustan College of Arts & Science, Padur
- Occupation: Actor
- Years active: 2011–present
- Spouse: Prachi Mishra (m. 2020)
- Children: 1

Mahat Raghavendra is an Indian actor, who predominantly works in Tamil films apart from a few Telugu and Hindi films. He is best known for his supporting roles in the heist thriller film, Mankatha (2011) and the action drama, Jilla (2014).

== Career ==
After finishing a degree at Hindustan College of Arts and Science, Raghavendra pursued a career in films. Prior to his first full-fledged acting role, Raghavendra was seen as a background artiste in Vallavan (2006) and Kaalai (2008), two films starring his childhood friend, Silambarasan. He was initially set to make his debut in a Tamil remake of the successful Telugu film, Ullasamga Utsahamga (2008), but the venture was dropped. Raghavendra was signed to portray a role in Venkat Prabhu's action thriller Mankatha (2011) which featured an ensemble cast including Ajith Kumar, Arjun and Vaibhav. Raghavendra appeared as a Dharavi bar owner and the film opened to critical and commercial acclaim in August 2011. For his performance in the film, Raghavendra was recognised as the year's Best Male Debut Actor from the Edison Awards committee.

Raghavendra played his first lead role in the Telugu film, Backbench Student (2013), where he appeared alongside Piaa Bajpai and Archana Kavi. He was cast in the film after the makers were impressed after seeing an interview of the actor during his promotions for Mankatha. He then featured in the fantasy comedy Bunny n Cherry (2013) alongside Prince Cecil. Raghavendra made a return to Tamil films with Jilla (2013), starring alongside Mohanlal and Vijay, in a supporting role. Raghavendra continued to star in small budget ventures including Ladies & Gentlemen (2015) and Run (2016), where he made a guest appearance. Mahat featured in Simbu, Megha Akash Starrer Vantha Rajavathaan Varuven Tamil Movie, which was released in February 2019.

Aatla Arjun Reddy directorial Cycle, a Telugu Movie, was released in January 2021 featuring Mahat and Punarnavi. Currently, he is shooting for his portions in 3 Tamil Movies namely Kettavanu Per Edutha Nallavanda, Ivan Than Uthaman, and Kaadhal Conditions Apply.

A light-hearted, breezy romantic drama is in the making, which will have Mahat and Sana. Kadhal Conditions Apply is directed by debutant Arvind R.

== Personal life ==
Mahat completed his schooling from Zion Matriculation School, Kodaikanal. He went on to graduate from Hindustan College of Arts & Science, Padur. Mahat's father Venkata Suryanarayana is a chemical engineer. His mother Umadevi Garimella is an ex-employee of the prestigious Commonwealth of Nations. She holds a master's degree in biochemistry. He has an elder sister, Renu.

Mahat began dating actress, model Prachi Mishra, a former Miss India 2012, in 2017. The pair became engaged in April 2019. Raghavendra married Prachi Mishra on 1 February 2020. Their son Adiyaman Raghavendra was born on 7 June 2021.

== Filmography ==
=== Films ===
Year	Title	Role	Language	Notes
2006	Vallavan	Vallavan's friend	Tamil	Uncredited role
2007	Kaalai	Jeeva's friend	Tamil	Uncredited role
2011	Mankatha	Mahat	Tamil	
2013	Backbench Student	Karthik	Telugu	
2013	Bunny n Cherry	Charan (Cherry)	Telugu	
2013	Biriyani	Himself	Tamil	Cameo appearance
2014	Jilla	Vignesh	Tamil	
2014	Vadacurry	Himself	Tamil	Cameo appearance
2015	Ladies & Gentlemen	Vijay	Telugu	
2016	Run	Manik	Telugu	Guest appearance
2016	Chennai 600028 II	Oor Kaavalan	Tamil	
2017	Anbanavan Asaradhavan Adangadhavan	Sabi	Tamil	
2019	Vantha Rajavathaan Varuven	Rohit	Tamil	
2021	Cycle	Vankayalu	Telugu	
2021	Maanaadu	Traffic Police	Tamil	Cameo appearance
2022	Maha	Vikram	Tamil	Cameo appearance
2022	Double XL	Srikanth Sreevardhan	Hindi	
2023	Maruthi Nagar Police Station	Jaishankar	Tamil	
TBA	Kadhal Conditions Apply		Tamil	
TBA	Ivan Than Uthaman	Siddharth	Tamil	
TBA	Kettavanu Peruyedhutha Nalavanda		Tamil	

=== Television ===
- Bigg Boss 2 – Contestant – Rejected Day 70 (2018)
- Unlimit (2018)
- Dancing Superstars (2019)
- Bigg Boss 3 – Guest (2019)
- Bigg Boss 4 – Guest (2020)
- Bigg Boss (Hindi season 16) – Guest (2022)

=== Web series ===
Year	Title	Role	Platform	Notes
2019	Madras Meter Show	Guest	ZEE5	Episode 6
2022	EMOJI	Aadhav	aha	

== Awards ==
- 2012: Edison Award for Best Debut Actor – Mankatha
- Iconic Gold Award for Best Debut Actor– Double XL https://twitter.com/IconicGoldAward/status/1638883278542479445
