= Prema Katha Chitram =

- Theatrical movie poster
- Directed by: J. Prabhakara Reddy
- Written by: Maruthi Dasari
- Produced by: Maruthi Dasari; Sudarshan Reddy
- Starring: Sudheer Babu; Nanditha; Praveen; Saptagiri
- Cinematography: J. Prabhakara Reddy
- Edited by: S. B. Uddhav
- Music by: Jeevan Babu
- Production company: Maruthi Media House Productions
- Distributed by: Maruthi Media House Productions
- Release date: 7 June 2013
- Running time: 130 minutes
- Country: India
- Language: Telugu
- Budget: ₹2.5 crore
- Box office: ₹20 crore

Prema Katha Chitram (transl. A Love Story Picture) is a 2013 Telugu-language horror comedy film produced by Maruthi and Sudarshan Reddy, and directed by J.Prabhakara Reddy. It stars Sudheer Babu and Nanditha. Reddy also is the cinematographer with editing by S. B. Uddhav and music by J.B. The audio of the film was launched on 12 April 2013 by Mahesh Babu. The film released on 7 June 2013 to positive reviews from critics.

The film was successful at the box office, emerging among the top 5 Telugu films in the year 2013. The film was remade in Kannada as Chandralekha with Chiranjeevi Sarja and in Tamil as Darling with G. V. Prakash Kumar. The film is listed among the "25 Greatest Telugu Films Of The Decade" by Film Companion. The film had a sequel in 2019 with a different cast reprising the roles, however, it became a failure at box office.

== Plot ==
The movie starts with Sudheer Babu, Praveen, and Nanditha planning a group suicide because of their failures in their respective lives. Firstly, they try to fulfill their last wishes before leaving this world. Nanditha wants to steal a new car and Sudheer wants to slap the local MLA in his own house. After stealing a new car and slapping the local MLA, the trio flees to a nearby farmhouse owned by Praveen's boss after escaping from the police. The car is stolen when the trio enter a restaurant to have some food. There, yet another suicide aspirant named Nellore Giri joins them and the four reach the farmhouse. There, Praveen and Nanditha, who is in love with Sudheer, plans to postpone their suicide for three days so that they can prevent Sudheer from committing suicide due to love failure.

Their plan turns successful and in that interval of three days, all the four get close to each other. Sudheer develops feelings for Nanditha but hesitates to tell her for fear of being humiliated by her. At the end of the third day, Praveen asks Nanditha to kiss Sudheer to divert from death, per male psychology. He meanwhile requests Sudheer to kiss Nanditha as she wants to experience her first kiss before dying to which Sudheer accepts with shame and shyness. As he tries to kiss her, a ghost enters the body of Nanditha, who forces Sudheer out of there. A flabbergasted Sudheer runs out of the room. Whenever Nanditha shows her feelings to Sudheer and Sudheer reacts to it by hugging or touching her, the ghost enters her body and scares Sudheer away. Unaware of the ghost's entry into her body, Nanditha grows depressed.

That night Sudheer learns about Nanditha, a hotel management student who falls for him, her neighbor. Sudheer never observes her and his intimacy with another girl leads Nanditha to plan to propose to Sudheer at any cost. Praveen, who wants to prevent Sudheer from killing himself, uses this opportunity and plans the combined suicide. Thus, the four are aware that they are not going to die. When Praveen hears Sudheer describing Nanditha as a ghost, he rushes to Nanditha's room to scold her and ask for an apology to Sudheer, only to see the ghost enter her body and thrash him. Giri too experiences the ghost's fury at its villainous best. The trio decide to distance themselves from her and always stay together.

Later, the trio have made multiple attempts to get the ghost to vacate Nanditha's body, only to earn the wrath of the ghost. After Nanditha realizes the ghost's presence in her, she too accompanies the trio to escape from there, in vain. The group decides to leave the house hoping that the ghost wouldn't bother them. However, the ghost comes out and forces Nanditha back inside. Sudheer tries to her to come but the ghost slaps him, telling him to go. Frustrated and enraged that the ghost has tortured and ruined him for so long he slaps her twice. Nanditha becomes sad and runs back inside the house. This forces the group to stay back as they will only leave along with her. As Sudheer apologizes to Nanditha, she asks hugs and asks him to never leave her. However, Sudheer pushes her back saying that them being close will make the ghost mad and asks her to keep her distance. Nanditha becomes hurt and depressed, resulting in a suicide attempt by slitting her wrist. Three rich men enter the farmhouse who permit the four to stay there. One of them is the owner of the farmhouse. Sudheer reaches Nanditha but in turn, is requested to kill those three by the ghost. Sudheer asks her the reason for vengeance, and the ghost narrates her story to the trio.

The ghost is Lakshmi, a newly married girl who enters the farmhouse with her husband for their first night. There these three drunk men break the boy's head with a champagne bottle and rape the girl. The boy dies after being impaled accidentally and drowning in the swimming pool. Then those three men bury her nearby. Sudheer, Praveen, and Giri decide to fight them and are successful in killing them. The ghost leaves Nanditha's body. The trio takes her to a nearby hospital, where Sudheer donates blood to her. She gains consciousness, and the movie ends with Saptagiri and Praveen watching the couple hugging each other.

== Cast ==
- Sudheer Babu as Sudheer
- Nanditha Raj as Nanditha
- Saptagiri as Giri
- Praveen as Praveen
- Kadiyala Praveena as ghost
- Sekhar as Dance Director (cameo)

== Reception ==
=== Critical reception ===
The film opened to positive reviews. 123Telugu gave a review of rating 3.5/5 stating "Humour, Horror, and Romance is base human emotions. When they are handled effectively, viewers will connect strongly to a story. The same is the case with 'Prema Katha Chitram'. The entertaining and thrilling second half will make you happy. Don’t miss this flick." Idlebrain gave a review of rating 3/5 stating "Made on a meagre budget of under 20 million, Prema Katha Chithram, from the team of low-budget super hits Ee Rojullo & Bus Stop, is going to be a winner at box office for its thrilling/entertaining moments in second half." Oneindia Entertainment gave a review stating "Prema Katha Chithram - Thriller with a pleasant surprise of good acting and story. Definitely an enjoyable movie." IndiaGlitz gave a review of rating 3.25/5 stating "It is a crazy idea that has been glossed over with immense craft. The film is a laugh riot. Even if you don't like one part of the film, you will like the rest of it, for it is a Montreal film with the sole purpose of dishing out entertainment and entertainment alone." APHerald.com gave a review of rating 3.5/5 stating "Prema Katha Chitram is a perfect mix of suspense-horror-love, don’t miss it." Telugucinema gave a review of rating 3.25/5 stating "Prema Katha Chitram hits right notes. The writer has mixed horror elements and comedy perfectly. It is a simple story and is told interestingly and entertainingly. In one sentence, it is a hilarious spooky thriller." way2movies.com gave a review of rating 3.25/5 stating "Despite few flaws, Prema Katha Chitram makes you glued to the screens for its right mix of horror and humor."

=== Box office ===
The first day collection of the film was ₹34 million (US$350,000). On the second day, it collected ₹29 million (US$300,000) and ₹25.8 million (US$270,000) on the third day, thus collecting ₹65 million (US$670,000) in just 3 days, which was a jackpot for the producers. By the week ending 30 June 2013 the film was declared a hit at the box office. The film completed 50 Days in 53 Centers on 26 July 2013 and completed 100 Days in 9 Centers on 14 September 2013.

== Soundtrack ==
Prema Katha Chitram

Soundtrack album to Prema Katha Chitram by Jeevan Babu
- Released: 12 April 2013
- Recorded: 2013
- Genre: Feature film soundtrack
- Length: 24:26
- Language: Telugu
- Label: Aditya Music
- Producer: Jeevan Babu

Jeevan Babu chronology
Bus Stop (2012)	Prema Katha Chitram (2013)	Kotha Janta (2013)

The music was composed by Jeevan Babu, in which the song, Vennelaina Cheekataina, is from Krishna-Sridevi's Pachchani Kaapuram was remixed. The film's audio was launched by Mahesh Babu on 12 April 2013 in Hyderabad. J.B. used D. Imman's composition "Ayayayoo Aananthamey" from the Tamil movie Kumki for the song Kothagunna Haaye.

Track listing
No.	Title	Lyrics	Artist(s)	Length
1.	"I Just Love You Baby"	Kasarla Shyam	Lipsika, Revanth	03:54
2.	"Vennelaina Cheekataina"	Veturi	Malavika, Revanth	04:27
3.	"Prema Katha Chitramidi"	Karunakar Adigarla	Rahul Sipligunj	03:20
4.	"Kothagunna Haaye"	Kasarla Shyam	Deepu, Ramya Behra	04:48
5.	"Oh My Love"	Kasarla Shyam	Lipsika	04:43
6.	"Prema Katha Chitram Dance Bit"		J.B., Rahul Sipligunj	02:02
7.	"Theme Music"		J.B.	01:12
Total length:				24:26

== Remakes ==
The film was remade in Kannada as Chandralekha with Chiranjeevi Sarja and in Tamil as Darling with G. V. Prakash Kumar.
