= Appavum Veenjum =

- Official poster
- Directed by: Viswan
- Starring: Sunny Wayne; Ramya Krishnan; Prathap Pothen
- Cinematography: Venugopal
- Edited by: B. Lenin
- Music by: Ouseppachan
- Release date: 12 June 2015
- Country: India
- Language: Malayalam

Appavum Veenjum (transl. Bread and wine) is a 2015 Indian Malayalam-language thriller drama film directed by Viswan and starring Sunny Wayne, Ramya Krishnan and Prathap Pothen.

== Cast ==
- Sunny Wayne as Freddy Peter George (Jude)
- Ramya Krishnan as Merlin Fernandez
- Prathap Pothen as Fernandez
- Reshma Rathore as Jela Fernandez
- Devi Ajith as Bride's mom
- Sunil Sukhada as Doctor Naina
- Arun
- Balu Varghese as Jithu
- Ouseppachan
- Lishoy
- Rajesh
- Shwetha Menon as a doctor (cameo appearance)

== Production ==
Ramya Krishnan returned to Malayalam cinema after a hiatus with this film. Reshma Rathore replaced Ragini Nandwani to play Sunny Wayne's love interest. This film marks her Malayalam debut and she plays a college student in the film. Prathap Pothen called his character crazy.

== Soundtrack ==
The music is composed by Ouseppachan. Prathap Pothen and his daughter Keya each sang a song in the film.

- "Karineela Kannulla" - Veetraag

== Reception ==
A critic from The Times of India opined that "The tale of love and revenge gives you a haunting feel. Most of the actor don't have much to do and seem wasted in blink-and-miss roles". Padmakumar K. of Manorama Online said that "the musical score, both background and the songs, by Ouseppachan is a pleasant surprise. The lush locales, perfect sound design and an off-beat treatment make Appavum Veenjum a blissful experience".
