= Romance (2013 film) =

- Directed by: Darling Swamy
- Written by: Darling Swamy
- Produced by: G. Srinivasa Rao; Sreenivasa Kumar Naidu (SKN)
- Starring: Prince; Dimple Chopade; Manasa
- Cinematography: J. Prabhakar Reddy
- Edited by: S. B. Uddhav
- Music by: Sai Karthik
- Production company: Good Cinema Group
- Release date: 2 August 2013
- Country: India
- Language: Telugu

Romance is a 2013 Telugu-language romantic comedy film written and directed by Darling Swamy and produced by G. Srinivasa Rao and Sreenivasa Kumar Naidu, under Good Cinemas Group, which also produced Ee Rojullo. The film stars Prince, Dimple Chopade, Manasa in the lead roles and Saikumar P, Bhargavi and others in vital roles. S. B. Uddhav and J. Prabhakar Reddy handled the editing and cinematography, respectively. The film was released worldwide on 2 August 2013.

== Cast ==
- Prince as Krishna
- Dimple Chopade as Anu
- Manasa as Lalitha
- Saikumar P as Bluetooth Babu
- Bhargavi as Shruti
- Prabhakar
- Venu Yeldandi

== Reception ==
Radhika Rajamani of Rediff.com rated the film 1 out of 5 stars and wrote the film "is crude and filled with vulgar lines making it difficult to watch". A critic from News18 wrote, "If you strip down love to its cheapest form, you get this low-budget flick that starts off as a light-hearted entertainer, but eventually turns bitter due to constant use of cuss words and double meaning undertones".
