= Backbench Student =

- Directed by: Madhura Sreedhar Reddy
- Screenplay by: Madhura Sreedhar Reddy; Venkat Sidda Reddy; Lakshmi Bhupal
- Story by: Madhura Sreedhar Reddy
- Produced by: Dr. M. V. K. Reddy
- Starring: Mahat Raghavendra; Piaa Bajpai; Archana Kavi; Brahmanandam
- Cinematography: Prasad G. K.
- Edited by: Dharmendra Kakarala
- Music by: Sunil Kashyap
- Production company: Shirdi Sai Combines
- Release date: 15 March 2013
- Country: India
- Language: Telugu

Backbench Student is a 2013 Indian Telugu-language romance film written and directed by Madhura Sreedhar Reddy. The film stars Mahat Raghavendra, Piaa Bajpai and Archana Kavi. BBS was produced by M. V. K. Reddy under the Shirdi Sai Combines banner and presented by Multidimension Entertainments. The protagonist (Mahat Raghavendra) fails in at least 16 subjects in his studies, and the story is about how this student’s life turns out to be. BBS was canned in 55 days of shooting in Hyderabad and Visakhapatnam with Prasad G. K. as the director of photography. Back Bench Student is set to be released worldwide on 15 March in more than 200 theatres. This film marks the lead debut of Raghavendra.

== Plot ==
Karthik (Mahat Raghavendra) is a careless engineering student, who is least bothered about his studies, the result of which is 16 backlogs. He is in love with his classmate Priyanka (Archana Kavi), who splits from him and leaves for USA to pursue MS. Hell breaks loose when his parents (Sarath Babu and Pragathi) come to know about the backlogs. While he is in search of a job to support himself, he hooks up with Chaitra (Piaa Bajpai). Meanwhile, Priyanka discontinues her studies and comes back from the US in search of Karthik. She learns that Karthik is in love with Chaitra and is disheartened and wonders what made Karthik fall for Chaitra. What happens next forms the rest of the story.

== Cast ==
- Mahat Raghavendra as Karthik
- Piaa Bajpai as Chaitra
- Archana Kavi as Priyanka
- Brahmanandam as Kareena Kapoor
- Sarath Babu as Karthik's Father
- Ali as Mr. NO Diwakar, Project Manager
- Pragathi as Karthik's mother
- Bannerjee as Priyanka's Father
- Insi Gutta (Note: Sister of badminton player Jwala Gutta.)
- Vennela Rama Rao

== Soundtrack ==
Back Bench Student

Soundtrack album by Sunil Kashyap
- Released: 17 February 2013
- Genre: Feature film soundtrack
- Length: 25:39
- Language: Telugu
- Label: Aditya Music
External audio
- Audio Jukebox on YouTube

The soundtrack of Back Bench Student consists of 7 songs composed by Sunil Kashyap, the lyrics of which were written by Sirasri and Lakshmi Bhoopal.

Tracklist
No.	Title	Lyrics	Singer(s)	Length
1.	"Engineering"	Sirasri	Vedala Hemachandra & Sri Jyothi	04:16
2.	"Jagada Jagada"	Sirasri	Vedala Hemachandra	03:47
3.	"Vennelamma"	Lakshmi Bhoopal	Dinakar	03:44
4.	"I am Sorry Vinara"	Sirasri	Sri Jyothi & Hemachandra	03:40
5.	"Telisi Telisi"	Lakshmi Bhoopal	Dinakar, Pranavi & Sunil Kashyap	03:50
6.	"Simbus Power" (Remix)	Sirasri	Silambarasan	03:15
7.	"Sachin Tendulkar Back Bencher"	Lakshmi Bhoopal	Anirudh Ravichander	03:06
Total length:				25:39

== Critical reception ==
Sangeetha Devi Dundoo of The Hindu praised the film in the departments of acting, music and cinematography and said that, "The intention is honest but a smart script to back it is sorely missing."
