= Maruthi =

Indian film director, screenwriter and producer

Maruthi Dasari
- Born: 8 October 1981 (age 44); Machilipatnam, Andhra Pradesh, India
- Occupations: Director; screenwriter; film producer
- Years active: 2012 - present
- Spouse: Veenaraga Spandana
- Children: 2

Maruthi Dasari is an Indian film director, screenwriter and producer who works in Telugu cinema. He started out directing low-budget films Ee Rojullo and Bus Stop (both 2012), that were well-liked for their young themes and relatable humor.

== Career ==
In 2012, Maruthi's directorial debut, Ee Rojullo, hit the screens to positive acclaim from critics. Despite being made on a modest budget of 50 lakhs, the film surpassed expectations by grossing over 10 crores. It emerged as one of the most successful Telugu films in 2012. Shortly after, in November 2012, his second directorial venture, Bus Stop, was released and declared a hit.

In 2013, Maruthi wrote and produced Prema Katha Chitram under Maruthi Talkies, introducing his cameraman J. Prabhakar Reddy as the director. The film turned out to be a sudden hit, grossing 20 crores. Maruthi continued his production journey with films like Prema Katha Chitram, Romance, Mahesh, Villa-2, Love You Bangaram, and Green Signal.

His subsequent directorial projects included Kotha Janta with Allu Sirish and Babu Bangaram with Venkatesh. Maruthi also contributed as a writer and screenwriter for Bhadram Be Careful Brotheru, which received critical acclaim. His collaboration with Nani on Bhale Bhale Magadivoy in 2015 proved to be a super hit, gaining praise for Nani's outstanding performance.

In 2014, Maruthi announced a project titled Radha starring Venkatesh and Nayantara. However, the film faced a setback when a writer accused Maruthi of copying his story, leading to the project being shelved.

== Filmography ==
Key
| † | Denotes films that have not yet been released |

=== As director ===
| Year | Title | Notes |
|---|---|---|
| 2012 | Ee Rojullo | |
| 2012 | Bus Stop | |
| 2014 | Kotha Janta | |
| 2015 | Bhale Bhale Magadivoy | |
| 2016 | Babu Bangaram | |
| 2017 | Mahanubhavudu | |
| 2018 | Shailaja Reddy Alludu | |
| 2019 | Prati Roju Pandage | |
| 2021 | Manchi Rojulochaie | |
| 2022 | Pakka Commercial | |
| 2026 | The RajaSaab | |

=== Other roles ===
| Year | Title | Producer | Writer | Actor | Notes |
|---|---|---|---|---|---|
| 2012 | Ee Rojullo | Yes | No | No | |
| 2013 | Prema Katha Chitram | Yes | Yes | No | |
| 2013 | Romance | Presenter | No | No | |
| 2014 | Love You Bangaram | Yes | No | Yes | |
| 2014 | Green Signal | Yes | No | No | |
| 2014 | Lovers | Yes | Screenplay | No | |
| 2015 | Best Actors | Yes | No | No | |
| 2016 | Bhadram Be Careful Brotheru | No | Yes | No | |
| 2016 | Rojulu Marayi | No | Yes | No | |
| 2017 | London Babulu | Yes | No | No | |
| 2018 | Brand Babu | No | Yes | No | |
| 2021 | 3 Roses | No | Creator | No | Aha web series |
| 2022 | Pakka Commercial | No | Yes | Yes | |
| 2025 | Oh Bhama Ayyo Rama | No | No | Yes | |
| 2025 | Tribanadhari Barbarik | Distributor | No | No | |

== Personal life ==
In 2003, Maruthi wed Veenaraga Spandana. The couple has a daughter, Hiya Dasari and a son. After relocating to Hyderabad, he first worked as a animator and painted number plates and signboards to supplement his income.

== Awards and nominations ==
| Year | Ceremony | Category | Work | Result |
|---|---|---|---|---|
| 2013 | 2nd South Indian International Movie Awards | Best Debut Director (Telugu) | Ee Rojullo | Won |
| 2016 | 5th South Indian International Movie Awards | Best Director (Telugu) | Bhale Bhale Magadivoy | Nominated |
