= Jai Sreeram =

- Official poster
- Directed by: Balaji N. Sai
- Produced by: Thella Ramesh; N.C.H. Rajesh
- Starring: Uday Kiran; Reshma Rathore
- Cinematography: Murali; Shiva
- Music by: Dhake
- Release date: 11 April 2013
- Country: India
- Language: Telugu

Jai Sreeram is a 2013 Indian Telugu-language action film directed by Balaji N. Sai. The film had Uday Kiran and Reshma Rathore in lead roles with Adithya Menon as the villain. This film happened to be Uday Kiran's last completed film. The film was an unofficial, namesake sequel to Sreeram (2002).

== Plot ==
Sreeram Srinivas (Uday Kiran) is a tough and honest cop. He values his job and fights for justice and the protection of society. His moral values and ethics bring him into direct conflict with Chintamani and his son (Aditya Menon). Chintamani is a corrupt politician who runs an illegal organ trade racket by exploiting orphans and homeless people. Sreeram Srinivas decides to put an end to Chintamani's game. He even goes against the Police Commissioner Ram (Chalapathi Rao)’s orders. But he faces some unexpected difficulties in the form of dishonest colleagues. Sreeram’s life is destroyed. His family is killed. There is nothing left for him. That is when our hero decides to take revenge. He starts hunting down Chintamani and his gang. He does not spare his corrupt colleagues as well. What happens in the end and how Sreeram achieves his objectives is what ‘Jai Sreeram’ is all about.

== Cast ==
- Uday Kiran as Sreeram Srinivas
- Reshma Rathore as R. Reshma
- Chalapati Rao as Police Commissioner Ram
- Adithya Menon as Adi Narayana
- Thagubothu Ramesh as Ramesh
- Fish Venkat as Adi Narayana's henchman
- Prabhakar
- Giridhar as Giri
- Ambati Srinivas as Area Councillor
- Bhaskar
- Harish Kalyan as Sidhu
- Master Kiriti
- Sana as Sreeram's mother
- Kamal as Kamal, Reshma's brother

Uncredited

- Banerjee
- Sonam Singh in a special appearance in "Okati Rendu Moodu"

== Soundtrack ==
No.	Title	Singer(s)	Length
1.	"Kaipeeku Vollu"	Bhargavi Pillai
2.	"Bhaga Bhaga" (Male version)	Hemachandra
3.	"Bhaga Bhaga" (Duet version)	Hemachandra, Tejaswini
4.	"Sayyasamamasam"	Koushik Kalyan, Shruti, Sravani
5.	"Jai Sriram"	Sri Sowmya
6.	"Chaka Cahkamani"	Tejaswini
7.	"Okati Rendu Moodu"	Uma Neha

== Reception ==
The film was released to moderate reviews. The Times of India gave the movie good review appreciating the cinematography and Uday Kiran's performance.
