= Neetho (2022 film) =

2022 Indian telugu-language film

- Official poster
- Directed by: Balu Sharma
- Produced by: AVR Swamy; M. R. Kirtana; Snehal Jangala
- Starring: Aberaam Varma; Saathvika Raj
- Cinematography: Sundar Ram Krishnan
- Edited by: Marthand K. Venkatesh
- Music by: Songs: Vivek Sagar; Score: Smaran
- Production companies: Prithvi Creations; Million Dreams Creations
- Release date: 14 October 2022
- Country: India
- Language: Telugu

Neetho (transl. With you) is a 2022 Indian Telugu-language romantic drama film directed by Balu Sharma and starring Aberaam Varma and Saathvika Raj.

== Cast ==
- Aberaam Varma as Varun
- Saathvika Raj as Meghna
- Ravi Varma as Varun's colleague
- Sunjiit Akkinepally as Varun's colleague
- Rajiv Kanakala
- Pavitra Lokesh
- Thummala Narasimha Reddy
- Neha Krishna
- Kavya Raman
- Apoorva Srinivasan
- Mohit Baid
- Padmajaa El
- Gururaj Manepalli
- Sanjay Raichura
- Snehal Jangala
- AVR Swamy
- CS Prakash
- Sandeep Vijayvardhan
- Krishna Mohan

== Production ==
Aberaam Varma plays an insurance agent and Saathvika Raj plays an independent woman. The film was shot in 2021.

== Soundtrack ==
The soundtrack was composed by Vivek Sagar.

- "Raajeelay Levinka" - Vivek Sagar, (lyrics by Kittu Vissapragada)
- "Madhuramey" - Aditi Bhavaraju, Lipsika Bhashyam (lyrics by Srinivasa Mouli)
- "Lalanaa" – Hariharan (lyrics by Varun Vamsi B)
- "Andharaani" - Gowtham Bharadwaj, Vivek Sagar (lyrics by Srinivasa Mouli)

== Reception ==
A critic from The Times of India wrote that "In a sea of love stories dished out every often, Neetho feels refreshing in its approach. Apart from some honest performances, well-shot frames and genre-encompassing soulful music form the movie's soul. Cinematography by Sundar Ram Krishnan, music direction by Vivek Sagar and background score by Smaran need a special mention. The makers fused multiple genres to create the required ambience. On the whole, Neetho is a modern take on love and relationships. Watch it for its tastefully crafted scenes laced with soulful music. However, its introspective monologues and philosophical dialogues might only appeal to niche audiences". A critic from OTT Play wrote that "Neetho explores several grey areas in modern-day relationships with maturity".
