= Sankarabharanam (2015 film) =

- Release poster
- Directed by: Uday Nandanavanam
- Written by: Kona Venkat
- Screenplay by: Venkatesh Kilaru
- Story by: Kona Venkat
- Based on: Phas Gaye Re Obama (2010)
- Produced by: M. V. V. Satyanarayana
- Starring: Nikhil Siddharth; Nanditha Raj; Anjali
- Cinematography: Sai Sriram
- Edited by: Chota K. Prasad
- Music by: Praveen Lakkaraju
- Production company: MVV Cinema
- Release date: 4 December 2015
- Running time: 154 minutes
- Country: India
- Language: Telugu

Sankarabharanam is a 2015 Indian Telugu-language crime comedy film directed by Uday Nandanavanam and written by Kona Venkat. It stars Nikhil Siddharth, Nanditha Raj and Anjali in the lead roles. It is produced by MVV Sathyanarayana under the Banner MVV Cinema. The music is composed by Praveen Lakkaraju and cinematography is by Sai Sriram and the film editing by Chota K. Prasad. The film was a remake of 2010 Hindi film Phas Gaye Re Obama.

== Plot ==
An NRI, Gautham, who is on the verge of bankruptcy, learns that he owns a palace in India and sets out to sell it. However, his visit to India turns into an insane journey when he gets kidnapped.

== Cast ==
- Nikhil Siddharth as Gautham
- Nanditha Raj as Happy Thakur
- Anjali as Daaku Rani Munni
- Sampath Raj as Central Minister Lal / Krishna (Dual Role)
- Suman as Raghu, Gautham's Father
- Sithara as Rajjo Devi, Gautham's Mother
- Rao Ramesh as Badrinath Thakur, Happy's Father
- Sanjay Mishra as Bhai Saab
- Saptagiri as Akshay Kumar
- Prudhvi Raj as Percentage Paramesh S.I
- Satyam Rajesh as Lakshman Yadav
- Viva Harsha as Happy's cousin
- Praveen
- Diksha Panth
- Geetha Singh
- Ankitha Sharma
- Shakalaka Shankar

== Production ==
Filming began in early June 2015 on locations in Maharashtra before moving to Bihar and before then shifting to Hyderabad, and in late June, production was reported as going very well. Filming wrapped on 15 October 2015.

== Soundtrack ==
Sankarabharanam

Soundtrack album by Praveen Lakkaraju
- Released: 2015
- Recorded: 2015
- Genre: Soundtrack
- Length: 24:09
- Label: Mango Music
- Producer: Praveen Lakkaraju

Praveen Lakkaraju chronology
Chinna Cinema (2013)	Sankarabharanam (2015)	Express Raja (2016)

The soundtrack has been composed by Praveen Lakkaraju. Mango Music launched the audio tracks of the movie.

Track-List
No.	Title	Lyrics	Singer(s)	Length
1.	"Banno Rani"	Sreejo	Rahul Sipligunj	5:19
2.	"Daaru Peeley Bro"	Sirasri	Baba Sehgal	2:29
3.	"Ding Dong"	Sreejo	Nutana Mohan, Vedala Hemachandra	3:08
4.	"Ghanta"	Sreejo	Uma Neha	2:13
5.	"Rock Your Body"	Sreejo	S. Thaman	3:47
6.	"Sangeeth Song"	Sreejo	Rahul Nambiar, Lipsika	3:42
7.	"Thoorupey"	Sreejo	Karthik, Ramya Behara	3:31
Total length:				24:09
