= Yaaruda Mahesh =

2013 Indian film by R. Madhan Kumar

- Movie poster
- Directed by: R. Madhan Kumar
- Written by: R. Madhan Kumar
- Screenplay by: R. Madhan Kumar
- Story by: R. Madhan Kumar
- Produced by: Antony Nawaz; Sathya Narayanan; R. Madhan Kumar
- Starring: Sundeep Kishan; Dimple Chopade
- Cinematography: Raana
- Music by: Gopi Sunder
- Production companies: Colour Frames; Red Studios
- Distributed by: Anbu Pictures
- Release date: 26 April 2013
- Language: Tamil
- Box office: ₹8 crore (US$830,000)

Yaaruda Mahesh (transl. Who is Mahesh?) is a 2013 Tamil-language adult comedy film directed by R. Madhan Kumar, starring Sundeep Kishan and Dimple Chopade. The film was shot around Chennai and Kerala. It was produced by Red Studios and Colour Frames. Its soundtrack and background score were composed by Gopi Sunder, while Raana handled the cinematography. The film released on 26 April to below average reviews. It did average business at the box office. The film was dubbed into Telugu under the title Mahesh.

== Plot ==
The film opens with the protagonist Shiva going to college for an exam, where his pen runs out of ink. He receives a new one from the girl next to him, Sindhya. He immediately falls for her and starts following her. He attends an educational tour with Sindhya, Vasanth, and Priya (Vasanth's lover). Eventually, Sindhya too falls for Shiva. He then finds out that she got the top rank in the test and a scholarship to the US. Before she leaves, Sindhya invites Shiva to breakfast at her house while her family is out. At her house, Shiva strips her, and the two end up having sex. Sindhya then goes to the US. She comes back three months later, saying that she has some private information to tell him. When she gets back, she announces to Shiva that she is pregnant, thinking that no one else is in the house. However, Shiva's parents overhear this, and they scold the two for having sex.

The film skips ahead a few years to show Shiva and Sindhya, husband and wife, having a child. Sindhya is working, while Shiva is an unemployed husband, looking after the child at home. Sindhya's brother Randy, a psychiatrist, tries to help by setting up a trick for Shiva to discover his interests. He sets up a plot in which Shiva overhears Sindhya talking to a person named Mahesh who is really Randy, making Shiva think that the child is not his, but someone else's. Sindhya and Randy want Shiva to overhear them talking. Shiva gets suspicious about who Mahesh is and starts getting data from the library, helped by Vasanth. The climax is in the people he meets and he finally figures who it is. He accuses Sindhya and tries to kill the child. His family and Randy then explain what happened. He then rewrites the test and passes. The movie ends with Shiva getting a job and Randy still on his case on whether he is back to normal.

== Cast ==
- Sundeep Kishan as Shiva
- Dimple Chopade as Sindhya
- Jagan as Vasanth
- Srinath as Randy
- Robo Shankar as Gopal
- Venkat Sundar as Military
- Sneha Ramesh as Priya
- Livingston as Shiva's father
- Singamuthu as Military's father
- Uma as Shiva's mother
- Swaminathan
- Neelu Nasreen
- Ajith Kumar
- Archana Harish as Vasanth's wife
- Nellai Siva
- KPY Ramar
- Vadivel Balaji
- Sana Oberoi (special appearance in the song "Odum Unakkithu")

== Release ==
The satellite rights of the film were sold to Sun TV. The film was given an "A" certificate by the Indian Censor Board. The film released in 72 screens on 26 April 2013 with another movie, Naan Rajavaga Pogiren.

== Reception ==
=== Box office ===
The film opened with 90 shows on its first weekend in the Chennai box office. It was removed after one week. The film's final gross was more than ₹8 crore (US$830,000) worldwide. The film was declared an average grosser. The film was a flop.

=== Critical reception ===
The film received below average reviews from critics. The Times of India wrote, "If double-meaning, adult jokes are your cup of tea, you will enjoy this movie." Indianexpress wrote, "With a wafer-thin plot, the debutant director weaves together a string of incidents. At times, it seems more like a theater of the absurd, with quirky characters and scenes added on just for its bizarre humor quotient, rather than for its relevance to the plot." Behindwoods wrote, "To sum it up, Yaaruda Mahesh is a unidirectional product that targets youth with liberal dose of adult humor but is not powerful enough to sustain the interests through the entire length of the film."

== Soundtrack ==
The soundtrack was composed by Gopi Sundar.

- "Yaaruda Andha Mahesh" — Gopi Sundar, Anna Katherina
- "Pudhu Paarvai" — Haricharan, Priya Himesh
- "Vayadhai Keduthu" — Anna Katherina, Suchith Suresan
- "Odum Unakkithu" — Anna Katherina, Suchith Suresan
- "Yemaathita" — Mukesh Mohamed, Gopi Sundar
- "Uyire Uyiril" — Gopi Sundar
