= Bunny n Cherry =

2013 Indian Telugu-language comedy film

- Theatrical release poster
- Directed by: Rajesh Pulli
- Written by: Tirumala Shetty (dialogues)
- Screenplay by: Rajesh Pulli
- Story by: Rajesh Pulli
- Produced by: Rajith Parthasaradhi
- Starring: Prince Cecil; Mahat Raghavendra; Kruthi; Saba
- Music by: Sri Vasanth
- Production company: Multi Dimension Entertainments Pvt. Ltd.
- Distributed by: Haroon Gani Arts
- Release date: 14 December 2013
- Country: India
- Language: Telugu

Bunny n Cherry (Note: Bunny and Cherry refer to the nicknames of Allu Arjun and Ram Charan, respectively.) is a 2013 Indian Telugu-language comedy film directed by Rajesh Pulli and starring Prince Cecil, Mahat Raghavendra, Kruthi and Saba. Pulli Kruthi and Saba make their debuts with this film.

== Cast ==
- Prince Cecil as Karthik a.k.a. Bunny
- Mahat Raghavendra as Charan a.k.a. Cherry
- Kruthi
- Saba
- Suman as Dr. Saxena
- Brahmanandam
- Seetha as Bunny's mother
- Posani Krishna Murali
- Jeeva
- Chandra Mohan
- L. B. Sriram
- Gautham Raju
- Shankar Melkote
- Duvvasi Mohan
- Yandamuri Veerendranath
- Apoorva

== Production ==
In August 2013, Ram Charan enquired about the film's plot after it was reported to be similar to the yet-to-be-released Yevadu. A platinum disc function was held on 12 December 2013.

== Reception ==
A critic from The Times of India wrote that "Save a couple of songs and some funny moments the movie just has too many bloopers".
