= Neeku Naaku Dash Dash =

Neeku Naku Dash Dash
- Theatrical release poster
- Directed by: Teja
- Written by: Teja
- Produced by: V. Anand Prasad
- Starring: Prince Cecil; Nanditha Raj
- Cinematography: Rasool Ellore
- Edited by: Kotagiri Venkateswara Rao
- Music by: Yaswanth Nag
- Production company: Bhavya Creations
- Release date: 12 April 2012
- Running time: 165 minutes
- Country: India
- Language: Telugu

Neeku Naaku Dash Dash (transl. ___ ___ for you and me) is a 2012 Indian Telugu romantic thriller film directed by Teja is about a student named Siva who is forced to drop out of college to work with the liquor mafia, who forces teenagers to work for them. He falls in love with Gayathri, which causes trouble with the mafia, which molds the rest of the story.

== Plot ==
Siva, who studies in a village, stands as a guarantor for his friend's loan. While the lender comes and asks for money, his friends refuse to pay up. So Siva has to drop his college and for returning the loan the lender takes him to the nearby town where he had to work for the liquor mafia. There he meets Gayathri, they fall in love and Gayathri learns that she is pregnant. Meanwhile, Siva tries to get his mistake (getting Nagaraj killed because of him and his friend Toofan) set right by stealing the money from his owner and at the same time there would be chaos in the building they work. So finally they escape from them and they are then pursued by the Chitti Thalli, Bapineedu and the police.

== Cast ==
- Prince as Siva
- Nanditha as Gayathri
- MS Chowdary as Bapineedu
- Suman Setty as Toofan
- Teertha as Chitti Thalli
- Sudheer Varma as Nagendra
- Banerjee
- Uttej
- Tanikella Bharani
- Venky Kudumula
- Venu Yeldandi as Bapineedu's sidekick
- Shruti Reddy in a special appearance in the song 'Boys Boys'

== Soundtrack ==
No.	Title	Singer(s)	Length
1.	"Aapakura"	Dheeraj, Sruthi
2.	"Boy Boy"	Deepak, Sindhu, Gayathri, Saranya
3.	"Chekumuki Vadana"	Abhiram, Lipsika
4.	"Dash Dash"	Kalpana, Yashwanth Nag
5.	"Nee Kopam"	Naresh Iyer, Chinmayi Sripada
6.	"Nuvve Nenanana"	Yashwanth Nag
7.	"Parugu Parugu"	Yashwanth Nag, Balu
8.	"Pranam Ani Thalachi"	Yashwanth Nag

== Reception ==
Radhika Rajamani of Rediff.com termed the film "mediocre" and rated 2/5. "Neeku Naaku Dash Dash starts off on a promising note but loses steam in the second half", Rajamani added. The Times of India critic awarded the film 2 1/2 stars out of 5 and stated: "One gets the feeling that director Teja tried to do a little too much with the movie, loading the narrative with multiple emotions all through."
