= Madhavi Latha =

Indian para-athletics sportswoman

Madhavi Latha Prathigudupu is a former para-athletics sportswoman who advocates for inclusion of persons with disabilities in sports and society. In 2011, she founded the Paralympic Swimming Association of Tamil Nadu, a non-governmental organization (NGO) that aims to "create awareness about the importance and rehabilitation impact of swimming". She is also the founder of the Wheelchair Basketball Federation of India (WBI), India's national wheelchair basketball body, and the founder of Yes, We Can Too, a charitable trust focused on persons with disabilities. in sports.

Madhavi Latha Prathigudupu won three gold medals at the National 15th National Paralympic Swimming Championship in 2015, among other swimming awards.

== Early life and initiation into para-sports ==
Madhavi was born as the youngest of four siblings in a small village in Telangana, to a father who was a school-teacher and a mother who was a homemaker. She was diagnosed with polio at 7 months old, a condition that caused her legs and her spinal cord to weaken, due to which she began to use a wheelchair from an early age. She was left with a paralyzed lower body, and minimal movement in her hands and even caused her to not be able to speak. Madhavi completed her schooling and pursued a college degree privately, graduating with a B.A. in mathematics. She also completed a typist to improve her job prospects, as she was instilled with the desire to be financially independent from her parents. She got a job for a state bank in Hyderabad before moving to Standard Chartered bank in Chennai in 2006. In Hyderabad, Madhavi learned to ride a scooter, and then later, a car, so that she could commute independently.

In her late 30s, the disease had progressed, causing life-threatening complications to her spine and her lungs. Her spine had compressed further owing to the disease and was putting pressure on one of her lungs, depriving her body of oxygen. Doctors gave her between six months to a year to live. It was at this time that her physiotherapist, Dr Anand Jothi, suggested that she take up hydrotherapy. The buoyancy of the water made her body weight lighter, and her legs and back were able to support the weight of her body underwater. Following her doctor's advice, Madhavi started to teach herself to swim using inflatable tubes, as she could not find a coach. It was only after she had learned how to swim freestyle that she found herself a coach, who then taught her about the other styles of swimming – butterfly stroke, breast stroke, etc. In an interview, she said, "Under water my weight is lesser. Inside the water, I can use muscle movements with little effort. I feel like a fish inside the water."

Madhavi entered the realm of competitive sports in 2010 by joining a corporate Olympiad, during her time at a global banking corporation. In that swimming competition, she was the sole participant with a disability. The event organizers made sure she was accompanied by four individuals for safety purposes. Despite this, she successfully finished the 100m freestyle race, earning significant acclaim and the honor of being named the Most Encouraging Sportsperson.

== Career ==
After her first experience in the 2010 corporate Olympiad, Madhavi went on to swim in competitive events regularly, with the highlight being when she won three gold medals in the 2011 National Paralympic Swimming Championships, in 50m freestyle, breast stroke and backstroke competitions. In 2012, she won two silver and two bronze Medals in the 12th National Paralympics Swimming Championship.

Madhavi's success with sports in her forties led her to start a movement called "Yes We Too Can", to promote sports for people with disabilities. In an interview, she said, "Team sports, as opposed to individual sports, helps the differently-abled people to fit in, besides assisting the physical rehabilitation process. Often, the differently-abled are socially isolated and not part of the mainstream, which severely affects their social skills and breeds an inferiority complex. It reduces their anxiety and enhances their social skills, boosts their self-esteem and helps them interact better." Her advocacy activities led her to begin a state-level association – the Paralympic Swimming Association of Tamil Nadu, in 2011. This association started with 4 para-swimmers and has expanded to have over 300 swimmers, several of whom represent the state of Tamil Nadu in national championships, as of 2016. She was the General Secretary for the Paralympic Swimming Association of Tamil Nadu.

=== Wheelchair Basketball Federation of India (WBFI) ===
After this, Madhavi was approached by UK-based NGO Choice International to partner with them to promote wheelchair basketball in India. Madhavi got on board, and this led to her, along with a few other individuals, instituting the Wheelchair Basketball Federation of India (WBFI) in 2014. Madhavi is the founder President of WBFI, which is a registered national body. One of these individuals was Kalyani Rajaraman, an activist working for people with disabilities, who served as the Secretary-General of WBFI. They aimed for wheelchair basketball to be seen as a competitive sport in India, as opposed to a rehabilitative activity, as it was generally perceived as. Currently, WBFI aims to put a team from India at the Wheelchair Basketball Championship, in the 2020 Paralympics at Tokyo.

Through WBFI, Madhavi campaigns for greater inclusion of people with disabilities in the sporting world. Finding individuals to participate in wheelchair basketball was an initial challenge as there were no state or national level sports associations or clubs for wheelchair basketball in India. However, in 2014, WBFI initiated the first National Wheelchair Basketball Championship at Chennai with 5 teams from different states – Tamil Nadu, Delhi, Kerala, Karnataka and Maharashtra. Madhavi and Kalyani also engineered an association between the representatives from the International Wheelchair Basketball federation and the second National Wheelchair Basketball Championship held at New Delhi in December 2015. This happened after Madhavi and Kalyani were invited by the International Wheelchair Basketball Federation (IWBF), to attend the Asia Pacific conference in Japan in 2015, and the IWBF recognised WBFI as an authorised body to promote wheelchair basketball in India. IWBF supported the efforts of WBFI by sending four instructors who extended technical help, besides training coaches, classifiers and referees in a camp conducted at Hyderabad.

As of 2017, the Wheelchair Basketball Federation of India has facilitated the creation of 14 state teams of wheelchair basketball, including 7 all-women teams. Four National Championships have been conducted – Chennai in 2014, Delhi in 2015, Chennai in 2016, and Hyderabad in 2017. WBFI conducted the first-of-its-kind National technical camp from 22 to 26 June 2016 in partnership with the International Wheelchair Basket Federation and Sports Authority of Telangana State. One of its highlight achievements was when they sent in a men's and a women's wheelchair basketball team to the 4th Bali Cup International Tournament, where both teams won a bronze medal each. These were the first medals in wheelchair basketball that were won in an international tournament by an Indian team.

== Challenges ==
As a vocal advocate for para-sports, Madhavi is outspoken about the challenges faced by people with disabilities in the sporting world. The biggest challenge, she has stated in an interview, is the access to sports facilities. She narrated an incident wherein, despite being a three-time Gold medallist in the National Para-Swimming Championships, she was denied entry at a new swimming pool that she had gone to when her regular pool was undergoing renovation. "Even after being a national champion, they told me that I cannot swim on my own, that I need to bring my medical certificate and show it to them," she said. The lack of trained instructors, coaches and sports equipment exacerbates this lack, contributing to the low uptake of para-sports in India. "We do not even have sports equipment for wheelchair-bound [sic] sportspersons. It has to be imported from abroad," she said.

Madhavi has also spoken about how the absence of para-sports in school curriculum, and the lack of media coverage that para-sports receives, means that many people do not even know about its existence. On a related note is the absence of specific government policy and regulation for para-sports.

== Awards ==
On 18 January 2016, Madhavi Latha was honoured with the "Built Tough Award" at the Adding Smiles Ambassador Awards ceremony for her efforts towards promoting sports among disabled people.
