= Babu Bangaram =

- Film poster
- Directed by: Maruthi
- Written by: Darling Swamy (dialogues)
- Screenplay by: Maruthi
- Story by: Maruthi
- Produced by: Suryadevara Naga Vamsi; P. D. V. Prasad; S. Radha Krishna (Presenter)
- Starring: Venkatesh; Nayanthara
- Cinematography: Richard Prasad
- Edited by: S. B. Uddav
- Music by: Ghibran
- Production company: Sithara Entertainments
- Distributed by: Haarika & Hassine Creations
- Release date: 12 August 2016
- Running time: 150 mins
- Country: India
- Language: Telugu
- Budget: ₹28 crore (US$3.0 million)
- Box office: ₹46.2 crore (US$4.9 million)

Babu Bangaram (transl. The Boy is Gold) is a 2016 Indian Telugu-language action comedy film produced by Suryadevara Naga Vamsi, P. D. V. Prasad on Sitara Entertainments banner and directed by Maruthi. Starring Venkatesh and Nayanthara, it has music composed by Ghibran.

The film was launched on 16 December 2015 in Hyderabad and principal photography began the following day. The first look poster of the film was released on 7 April 2016 on the eve of Ugadi.

Babu Bangaram obtained a U/A from the censor board. The film had a worldwide release on 12 August 2016 amid much fanfare. The film was simultaneously released with a Tamil dubbed version titled Selvi.

== Plot ==
ACP Krishna is a kind-hearted man, who is even empathetic towards criminals. Sailaja is the daughter of an accused person named Sastry for murder, wanted by the police and hiding somewhere. Sailaja runs her family with a catering business and is struggling with her four sisters and grandmother on one side. On another side, she is facing an existential threat from Mallesh Yadav, a big goon who is a henchman of MLA Puchappa, and who both are after Sastry. One more thing that bothers her is Battayi Babji, her maternal uncle's son who pesters her to marry him. Krishna meets Sailaja when she is depressed. The sympathy inside him works out, and he falls in love with her at first sight.

Afterward, he learns about her problems and the fact that Sailaja hates the police. Because of this, he hides his identity, targets Babji, traps him with some comic tricks, introduces himself to Sailaja as a common man with Babji's help, and starts helping her and her family. In this process, they develop a bond, and Sailaja also starts loving him. However, Krishna's real agenda is completely different. He has been appointed by the commissioner to apprehend Sailaja's father Sastry. When Sailaja's grandmother collapses from a heart attack and wants to see her son Sastry, Krishna forces Sailaja to call her father. By giving an assurance, he makes her do so and Sastry visits the hospital. When Krishna tries to arrest him, he listens to the good impression that Sailaja and her family are having on him, so he is not able to arrest him.

Suddenly a CI, who is an assistant to Krishna, enters the scene, surrounds Sastry, and reveals the entire truth regarding Krishna. Sastry escapes but is suddenly attacked by goons of Puchappa and Mallesh. He is seriously injured and goes into a coma. Krishna protects him and joins in the hospital, but when Sailaja discovers Krishna's real motive and they breakup. Soon after, Krishna begins the investigation to explore the hidden truth in which he learns that Sastry is an Income tax officer. In a raid at Puchappa's house, he and his superior officer get a pendrive, which contains Puchappa's extramartial affair with Mallesh's wife and their photos, along with Mallesh's secrets The superior officer tries to make a deal with Mallesh. Knowing this, Sastry keeps the pen drive under wraps. Because of this, Puchappa and Mallesh kill the superior officer, put the blame on Sastry, and they are after the pen drive and his family. Krishna sends the photos of Puchappa and Mallesh's wife to Mallesh. Malkesh catches Puchappa and is about to kill him, but Krishna arrives and arrests them. Sastry is proved innocent and recovers from a coma where Krishna reunites with Sailaja.

== Cast ==
- Venkatesh as ACP Krishna aka Babu Bangaram
- Nayanthara as Sailaja
- Sampath Raj as Mallesh Yadav
- Posani Krishna Murali as MLA Puchappa
- Brahmanandam as Magic Mangamma
- Murali Sharma as Commissioner
- Jayaprakash as Sastry
- Vennela Kishore as SI Kishore
- Brahmaji as CI
- Rajitha as Sailaja's mother
- Sowcar Janaki as Sailaja's grandmother
- Prudhviraj as Battayi Babji
- Mamilla Shailaja Priya as Mallesh Yadav's wife
- Fish Venkat as Puchappa's henchmen
- Raghu Babu
- Ananth Babu
- Mast Ali
- Raja Ravindra as Inspector
- Prabhas Sreenu as Thief
- Gundu Sudharshan as Priest
- Giridhar as Constable
- Aravind as Mallesh Yadav's goon
- Jabardast Chandra as himself
- Meena
- Pavala Shymala
- Ragini
- Venu
- Nik Suler as a background dancer
- Sonam Bajwa as Special appearance in a title song

== Soundtrack ==
Babu Bangaram

Film score by Ghibran
- Released: 24 July 2016
- Recorded: 2016
- Genre: Soundtrack
- Length: 25:01
- Label: Aditya Music
- Producer: Ghibran

Ghibran chronology
Thoongaa Vanam (2015)	Babu Bangaram (2016)	Hyper (2016)

The music was composed by Ghibran. It was released by Aditya music company. The audio launch was held in Hyderabad on 24 July 2016. Top industry celebrities like Dasari Narayana Rao, Nani, Lavanya Tripathi etc., have attended the function.

=== Original ===
Babu Bangaram (Soundtrack)
No.	Title	Lyrics	Singer(s)	Length
1.	"Mallela Vaanala"	Ramajogayya Sastry	Naresh Iyer	4:05
2.	"Snehithudo"	Sri Mani	Ranjith	4:07
3.	"Dhandame Ettukuntam"	Bhaskarbhatla	Gold Devaraj	4:08
4.	"Dhillunna Vade"	Sri Mani	Dhanunjay,Ramee	3:07
5.	"Raaka Raaka"	Ramajogayya Sastry	Chinmayi , Yazin Nizar	4:15
6.	"Tikku Tikkantu"	Kasarla Shyam	Narendra,Uma Neha	1:42
7.	"Babu Bangaram"	Theme Music	Shabir	3:14
Total length:				25:01

=== Tamil ===
Selvi (Soundtrack)
No.	Title	Lyrics	Singer(s)	Length
1.	"Malligai Pandhale"	Sorkko	Jagadeesh Kumar	4:03
2.	"Snehidano Sevagano"	A.M.Ratnam, Siva Ganesh	Ranjith	4:06
3.	"Thangame"	Arun Bharathi	Gold Devaraj	4:07
4.	"Dil Irundha Vaada"	Meenatchi Sundaram	Dhanunjay, Vallavan	3:07
5.	"Kaadil Kaadil"	Viveka	Yazin Nizar, Hari Priya	4:13
6.	"Tip Top"	Lokam Bharathi	Gold Devaraj, Hemambiga	1:43
Total length:				25:01

== Release ==
12 August 2016 was announced as the worldwide release date. In 2017, it was dubbed into Hindi as Revolver Raja.

== Reception ==
The film has opened to some decent reviews all over. Noted website, 123telugu has rated the film 3.25 stars and quoted that "Venkatesh is the heart of the film which is a complete time pass family entertainer".

== Box office ==
Babu Bangaram collected approximately US$177,045 from 97 screens at the U.S. box office in the premiere shows on Thursday. This is the highest collection for a movie featuring Venkatesh and Babu Bangaram has become the biggest opener for him. The movie has shattered the record of Race Gurram, which collected US$102,782 at the U.S. premieres. Its collection is on par with that of Sarrainodu, which collected US$190,679 from 95 locations at paid preview shows in the U.S.
