= Nanditha Raj =

Indian actress

Nandita Raj
- Born: Mumbai, India
- Occupations: Actress, Model
- Years active: 2012—2019

Nandita Raj is an Indian actress. She made her debut in the Telugu film industry with the film Neeku Naaku Dash Dash, directed by Teja. She rose to prominence with the success of her second film Prema Katha Chitram, which earned her a Filmfare Award for Best Actress nomination.

== Personal life ==
Nanditha was born in Mumbai and raised in Delhi. Her father, Colonel Raj Kumar, is an army officer. He is from Hyderabad, while her mother, a legal advisor, is from Visakhapatnam. Nanditha can speak English, Hindi and Telugu. She studied in various army schools, including Army Public School (R.K. Puram), graduated with a B.Com. degree from St. Francis College, Hyderabad. And did her MBA through distance-learning from symbiosis, Pune.

After winning a beauty contest she started her acting career. Though she didn't plan her career in entertainment industry it was her mother who encouraged her to take up modeling as a career.

She is currently working as Creative lead at Olter Maharashtra

== Career ==
Nanditha started her film career with Neeku Naaku Dash Dash under the direction of Teja in 2012. She was reportedly selected for the role from a statewide hunt where she beat around 70,000 other aspirants. Her second film Prema Katha Chitram, with Sudheer Babu as her co-star, released on 7 June 2013. She played a hotel management student in the film, who is a big fan of a renowned dancer (Sudheer Babu). 123telugu.com wrote "Nandhita is the real star of the film. She is simply brilliant. There are certain sequences where she is required to exhibit dramatic changes in behaviour and she has excelled in those scenes". It became a box-office blockbuster. She was next seen in a Malayalam film London Bridge with Prithviraj Sukumaran. She played a Malayali girl in the film who goes to London for a job, and falls in love with the character played by Prithviraj.

== Filmography ==
- All films are in Telugu, Otherwise noted.

Year	Title	Role	Notes
2012	Neeku Naaku Dash Dash	Gayatri	
2013	Prema Katha Chitram	Nanditha / Nandu	Nominated - Filmfare Award for Best Actress – Telugu
2014	London Bridge	Merin	Malayalam Film
2014	Lovers	Chitra	
2015	Ram Leela	Sasya	
2015	Krishnamma Kalipindhi Iddharini	Radha	
2015	Sankarabharanam	Happy	
2016	Savitri	Savitri	
2017	Jai Lava Kusa	Sravani	Cameo appearance
2017	Kathalo Rajakumari	Nanditha	Cameo appearance
2019	Viswamitra	Mitra	
