= Prince Cecil =

Indian actor

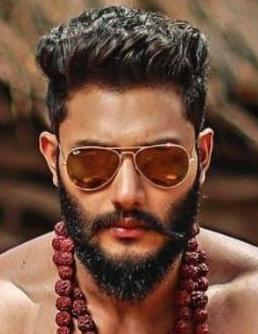
- Cecil in 2018
- Born: 3 June 1993 (age 33); Vishakapatnam, Andhra Pradesh, India
- Occupation: Actor
- Years active: 2012–present

Prince Cecil is an Indian actor who appears in Telugu films. He is best known for his film Bus Stop (2012). He was one of the contestants on the reality TV show Bigg Boss (2017).

== Career ==
Prince Cecil was studying B.Tech at Baba institute of technology and sciences, when director Teja came to Visakhapatnam for a male lead for his film, Neeku Naaku Dash Dash. After being recommended to audition, he got through the initial selection and attended a film workshop for the final candidates before being picked to play the lead role. Within two months of the release of his first film, Prince was offered another film named Bus Stop by director Maruthi, and that film became a large commercial success. His third and fourth releases, Romance and Bunny n Cherry (2013), opened to negative reviews and failed at the box office. He then featured in the bilingual film, Manasunu Maaya Seyake alongside an ensemble cast of Sethu, Disha Pandey and Richa Panai, but the film had a low key release in January 2014.

== Filmography ==
- All films are in Telugu, unless mentioned otherwise.

Key
†	Denotes films that have not yet been released

=== Film ===
Year	Title	Role	Ref.
2012	Neeku Naaku Dash Dash	Siva	
2012	Bus Stop	Seenu	
2013	Jabardasth	Bridegroom for Shreya	
2013	Romance	Krishna	
2013	Bunny n Cherry	Karthik (Bunny)	
2014	Manasunu Maaya Seyake	Shiva	
2014	Dollars Colony		
2015	Where Is Vidya Balan	Kiran	
2016	Nenu Sailaja	Ashok	
2016	Marala Telupana Priya	Jai Krishna, Karthick	
2017	Mister	Siddharth	
2020	Aswathama	Ravi	
2021	Power Play	Ravi	
2022	The American Dream	Rahul Dharanikota	
2022	DJ Tillu	Shannon Gonzales	
2022	Pellikuturu Party	Vikram	
2022	S5 No Exit	Sunny	
2023	Skanda	Sanjay Reddy	
2024	Tillu Square	Shannon Gonzales	
2024	Kali	Sivaram	
2026	Sampradayini Suppini Suddapoosani	SI Vikram	

=== Television ===
Year	Title	Role	Network	Notes
2017	Bigg Boss 1	Contestant	Star Maa	7th Place
2021	3 Roses	Kabir	Aha	
