= Ee Rojullo =

- Directed by: Maruthi
- Screenplay by: Maruthi
- Story by: Maruthi
- Produced by: Credited as "Good Friends"
- Starring: Mangam Srinivas; Reshma Rathore; Saikumar Pampana; Bhargavi
- Cinematography: J. Prabhakar Reddy
- Edited by: S. B. Uddhav
- Music by: Jeevan Babu
- Production company: Good Cinema Group
- Distributed by: Dil Raju
- Release date: 23 March 2012
- Running time: 126 min
- Country: India
- Language: Telugu
- Budget: ₹54 lakh (US$56,000)
- Box office: ₹18 crore distributors' share

Ee Rojullo (English: In These Days) is a 2012 Indian Telugu-language romantic comedy film directed by debutant director Maruthi. It stars debutants Srinivas, Reshma, Saikumar Pampana and Bhargavi. The film is produced by Good Friends group on a low budget. The film was a major commercial success and was one of the most successful Telugu films released in 2012. The film was remade in Kannada as Preethi Prema (2017). Maruthi won SIIMA Award for Best Debut Director (Telugu).

== Plot ==
This story explores the lack of moral and ethical values in relationships and the search for true love.

Sri (Srinivas) is deeply in love with Rajini. To support her, he even gives her ₹3 lakhs. However, Rajini does not truly love him. She runs away with another man, taking the money with her. Heartbroken, Sri decides never to fall in love again and begins to view women negatively.

In another track, Shreya (Reshma) is close friends with a guy named Kishore. Kishore misinterprets her friendship as love and develops feelings for her. He becomes possessive and starts harassing Shreya in the name of love. Hurt by this, Shreya resolves never to be friendly with any man again.

Eventually, Sri and Shreya's paths cross. They initially quarrel often. Meanwhile, Sri lies to his landlord, claiming that he is married, since the apartment is not rented to bachelors. When Shreya learns this, she believes he is married and softens her attitude toward him. Slowly, their friendship blossoms, and Sri begins protecting Shreya from Kishore.

However, Shreya's parents disapprove of her friendship with Sri and warn her to keep her distance. Just as their mutual admiration begins to deepen, Rajini reappears in Sri's life as his "wife." Heartbroken, Shreya decides to leave for the U.S. to pursue her master's degree.

Later, Sri and his friend Sai follow Rajini to an illegal hookah bar, where Sri learns that the man who eloped with Rajini cheated her and disappeared with her money. Now in debt, Rajini receives financial help from Sri, who transfers money to her out of goodwill and advises her not to play with others' emotions.

Meanwhile, Kishore resurfaces, revealing his true colors. His friendship with Shreya was only a ploy, as his real intention was to exploit her. When Shreya rejects his advances, he becomes aggressive and tries to force her into a relationship. Sri steps in to protect her. Enraged, Kishore hatches a plan to separate Sri and Shreya. He learns about Sri's past and uses Rajini as a pawn in his scheme. Kishore and his friends later attack Sri and Sai, but Sri fights back, defeats Kishore, and escapes with Sai. He then confesses everything to Shreya.

Two years later, with her parents' approval, Sri and Shreya get married. The film concludes with Sai narrating Sri’s story to producer Tammareddy Bharadwaja, who agrees to make it into a movie.

== Cast ==
- Mangam Srinivas as Srinivas Rao "Sri"
- Reshma Rathore as Shreya
- Saikumar Pampana as Sai, Sri's friend who lies to Shreya's parents that he is Sri's brother in law.
- Bhargavi as Rajini, who cheated Sri in the name of love.
- Ambati Srinivas as Watchman Manamma
- Shankar Rao
- M. S. Narayana as Sattiraju, Sri's uncle
- Madhumani as Shreya's mother
- Kedar Shankara as Shreya's father
- Venky
- Ragini as Sri's aunt
- Rambabu
- Anchor Ravi
- Anandhi in a special appearance in the song "Cell Song"
- Tammareddy Bharadwaja as Himself

== Soundtrack ==
Ee Rojullo

Soundtrack album to Ee Rojullo by Jeevan Babu
- Released: 9 February 2012
- Recorded: 2012
- Genre: Feature film soundtrack
- Length: 22:18
- Language: Telugu
- Label: Saregama
- Producer: Jeevan Babu

The music was composed by J.B. and lyrics were by Kasarla Shyam and Karunakar Adigarlla. The soundtrack consists of 7 tracks with 1 instrumental theme song. The audio rights were sold to Saregama. The audio release event was held at Rock Heights in Madhapur, Hydereabad on 9 February 2012. Actor Allu Arjun, Allu Aravind, Director Maruti, Reshma, Srinivas, Richa Gangopadhyay, Madhurima graced the event.

Track listing
No.	Title	Lyrics	Singer(s)	Length
1.	"Ring Tring"	Kasarla Shyam	Rahul Sipligunj, Prudhvi	4:01
2.	"Ninna Monna"	Karunakar Adigarlla	Malavika	3:53
3.	"Cell Song"	Kasarla Shyam	Rahul Sipligunj, Nagasahithi, Revanth	4:25
4.	"Ekindhi Le"	Karunakar Adigarlla	Hema Chandra	3:51
5.	"Edho Edho"	Karunakar Adigarlla	Geetha Madhuri, Revanth	3:53
6.	"Kanureppalu"	Karunakar Adigarlla	Hema Chandra	1:04
Total length:				22:18

== Reception ==
A critic from The Times of India gave a review of rating 3.5/5 stating "Your hero does not have a six-pack, nor does he make a grand entry. Your heroine is not the glamorous type and there's no skin show. There's no chasing of villains and beating them to pulp. There's no star cast to boast of, but "Ee Rojullo" is a film that you would enjoy with the comedy being seamlessly woven into the script." Jeevi of idlebrain.com gave a review of rating 3.25/5 stating "First half of the film is fun and second half has story. The plus points of the film are freshness and contemporary feel. The second half should have been more compact and the obscene dialogues/gestures should have been moderated. This film might not find a place for the people who may find certain dialogues and references to be offensive. But will go well with youth and masses. You may watch it." A critic from Rediff.com gave a review of rating 2/5 stating "Perhaps a youthful subject like Ee Rojullo may go down well with urban youngsters."

== Box office ==
Ee Rojullo was very successful at the box office, completing 50 days in 53 centres, 100 days on 1 July 2012, 175 days on 13 September 2012, and 365 days on 23 March 2013.
