= Alludu Seenu (soundtrack) =

Alludu Seenu (Original Motion Picture Soundtrack)

Soundtrack album by Devi Sri Prasad
- Released: 21 June 2014
- Recorded: 2013–2014
- Genre: Feature film soundtrack
- Length: 24:41
- Language: Telugu
- Label: Aditya Music
- Producer: Devi Sri Prasad

Devi Sri Prasad chronology
Legend (2014)	Alludu Seenu (Original Motion Picture Soundtrack) (2014)	S/O Satyamurthy (2015)

Alludu Seenu (Original Motion Picture Soundtrack) is the soundtrack album to the 2014 film of the same name directed by V. V. Vinayak and produced by Bellamkonda Suresh under Sri Lakshmi Narasimha Productions starring Bellamkonda Sreenivas in his debut with Samantha Ruth Prabhu, Prakash Raj, Pradeep Rawat, and Brahmanandam in lead roles. The film score and soundtrack album is composed by Devi Sri Prasad who previously worked with Vinayak on Adhurs (2010).

The film features six songs written by Chandrabose, Bhaskarabhatla Ravi Kumar, Ramajogayya Sastry and Sharmila. The soundtrack was released under the Aditya Music label on 21 June 2014 to positive reviews from critics and audiences.

== Release ==
The film's audio was initially scheduled for release on 7 June 2014, but was postponed to 21 June 2014. It was officially confirmed by the producers on 15 June, who also confirmed that the event will be held at Shilpakala Vedika in Hyderabad. Aditya Music acquired the film's audio rights and released the film's official track list featuring six songs on 19 June, two days before the audio launch.

The event was aired live on MAA Movies starting from 7:30 pm. Initially, N. T. Rama Rao Jr. was reported to be the chief guest for the film's audio launch. However, Rama Rao did not attend the event, and instead it was graced by Venkatesh, S. S. Rajamouli and Pranitha Subhash as the chief guests.

== Reception ==
=== Critics ===
Reviewing the album, The Times of India wrote: "it's the kind of album that's good to listen to but will not exactly make you go for a repeat listening" and rated the album 3 out of 5. Indiaglitz rated 2.5 out of 5, stating "Alludu Seenu is an album that manages to dish out average music." Suresh Kavirayani of Deccan Chronicle wrote "The songs are nice, well choreographed and also shot in beautiful locations, but seem to appear in the wrong places." Jeevi of Idlebrain.com described the music as "peppy" and the title song as one of his best picks.

=== Audience ===
The soundtrack received high consumer response from audiences and went viral upon release. The track "Labbar Bomma" which featured Tamannaah in an item number received praise upon release. It also had a record number of sales for which the label thanked Devi Sri Prasad and the film makers, one of the representatives from the company stated that:

"Devi Sri Prasad, who has given many super hit albums in his career, has provided beautiful songs for 'Alludu Seenu' and it has been creating sensation regarding sales, from the day it was released. All the songs are received well by the listeners and we thank DSP once again for the superb score."

To celebrate its success, a platinum disc function was held on 9 August at Hyderabad. With the cast and crew in attendance, the event was felicitated by N. T. Rama Rao Jr., Dil Raju, K. S. Ravindra, amongst others.

== Track listing ==
Alludu Seenu (Original Motion Picture Soundtrack) track listing
No.	Title	Lyrics	Artist(s)	Length
1.	"Ori Devudo"	Chandrabose	Javed Ali, Suchitra	4:14
2.	"Neeli Neeli"	Bhaskarabhatla Ravi Kumar	Karthik, Harini	4:09
3.	"Whats up Antu"	Ramajogayya Sastry, Sharmila	Devi Sri Prasad, Sharmila	4:00
4.	"Labbar Bomma"	Chandrabose	Sooraj Santhosh, Ranina Reddy	4:33
5.	"Oho Bujji Konda"	Chandrabose	Jaspreet Jasz, Sharmila	3:39
6.	"Alludu Seenu"	Chandrabose	Simha, Priya Himesh	4:06
Total length:				24:41

== Accolades ==
Accolades for Alludu Seenu (Original Motion Picture Soundtrack)
Award (Note: Awards are in alphabetical order.)	Date of ceremony (Note: Date is linked to the article about the awards held that year, wherever possible.)	Category	Recipient(s)	Result	Ref.
Mirchi Music Awards South	23 July 2015	Album of the Year – Telugu (Listener's Choice)	Run Raja Run	Nominated	
Mirchi Music Awards South	23 July 2015	Song of the Year – Telugu (Listener's Choice)	"Labbar Bomma"	Nominated	
Mirchi Music Awards South	23 July 2015	Song of the Year – Telugu (Listener's Choice)	"Alludu Seenu"	Nominated	
