= Kishkindhapuri =

2025 Indian film

- Theatrical release poster
- Directed by: Koushik Pegallapati
- Written by: Koushik Pegallapati; Bala Ganesh K. Darahas Palakollu
- Produced by: Sahu Garapati
- Starring: Bellamkonda Sai Sreenivas; Anupama Parameswaran; Sandy
- Cinematography: Chinmay Salaskar
- Edited by: Niranjan Devaramane
- Music by: Chaitan Bharadwaj
- Production company: Shine Screens
- Release date: 12 September 2025
- Running time: 125 minutes
- Country: India
- Language: Telugu

Kishkindhapuri is a 2025 Indian Telugu-language horror thriller film written and directed by Koushik Pegallapati. It is produced by Sahu Garapati for Shine Screens Ananda Media and stars Bellamkonda Sai Sreenivas, Anupama Parameswaran and Sandy.

The film was released on 12 September 2025 to positive reviews from critics and emerged as a commercial success at the box office, the first for Srinivas in over 6 years post Rakshasudu, grossing over ₹24.10 crore in its lifetime.

== Plot ==
In 1989, in the fictional village of Kishkindhapuri, the owners of 'Suvarna Maya', a radio station, are about to lock the doors at midnight when the lights go off, and a malevolent spirit uses the radios and speakers to communicate with the owners. Luring them into the basement, the spirit kills all of them gruesomely, leaving their bodies arranged in the shape of a swastika. The station is later closed permanently, with pujas performed by exorcists to ward off the spirit by sealing the doors with talismans and trishulas.

After 30 years, Raghava, his girlfriend Mythili "Mythu" and his friend Sumith are members of a ghost walking tour company, which takes tourists and locals to places, that the trio claim is haunted. However, the tours are fraudulent, with the company intending to script the incidents and the events of the entire tour, so that they can raise awareness and make the people be unafraid. As part of their next trip, Raghava's boss lets the tourists choose their location, which turns out to be 'Suvarna Maya' and they arrive at the location. Raghava breaks the talismans and the tourists enter the building. Unnoticed by them, the spirit enters the building along with them.

After the tourists experience eerie happenings around the place, they attempt to leave, only to find their van burning. The next morning, a local boy warns Raghava and Mythu about the radio station and tells them that the spirit will kill them. The next day all the twelve people receive a haunting notice from the spirit through the radios they brought with them that they will die for entering its domain and also expresses gratitude for re-starting the Suvarna Maya telecasts. As told, the spirit kills three tourists; each marked with a swastika. Raghava investigates Suvarna Maya, but locals stay silent out of fear. He discovers the station was supposedly haunted by Vedavathi, the first and last speaker of the station, and its owners died violently. When the spirit targets Moksha, Raghava burns the radios and taunts the ghost, exposing it as Visravaputra—a man posing as a woman. Enraged, Visrava vows to kill Raghava next, gruesomely.

Raghava, Mythu, and Sumith learn from Vedhavati's parents about Bhushana Varma, Visrava's mentor. Visrava, born during a lunar eclipse with a limp, was shunned by his father but doted on by his mother. He later killed his father after he assaulted his mother. He excelled under Varma's guidance and won a radio audition in 1989, but Vedhavati was credited as the winner. Furious, Visrava confronted the station owners and vanished mysteriously, with rumours that the owners killed him. The trio later discovers Varma had died years ago, and that Visrava had impersonated him. Visrava later rams the trio's car, injuring them, and then possesses Mythu in the hospital and attempts to kill Raghava, who incapacitates the possessed Mythu.

Raghava recalls seeing gas canisters in the radio station basement and confronts Surendhar, the supplier. Surendhar reveals that his brother Vaali Kumar, one of the owners of the station, loved Vedhavati and made her the station's speaker, which enraged Visrava, who publicly humiliated Vedhavati, leading to her suicide. In retaliation, Vaali and the other owners locked Visrava in the basement and tortured him with Sarin nerve gas for 12 days, resulting in his death, and buried him near the railway tracks. Surendhar also reveals that Visrava's mother died giving birth to him and he became an introvert who started talking to the things in his house. He found a magic handheld mirror one day and found his mother's reflection and used it to reflect his mother's affection towards him. His father threw away the mirror, prompting Visrava to kill him, becoming a psychopath in the process.

Later, they meet the successor of the Swamiji who performed the exorcism on the radio station and learn that Visrava tried to enter the station to retrieve the mirror but was thwarted by his predecessor. Raghava and his group accidentally broke the mirror, making Visrava believe that they killed his mother, and hence he wanted to kill them. The Swamiji suggests that they bring a belonging associated with Visrava to destroy him. Raghava lets Visrava possess him and fights with him, learning that Visrava's locket is the only way to lock him. He has Mythu get the locket from the basement and gives it to the Swamiji, who locks Visrava in a dome. A few days later, Raghava and Mythu are speaking about their future during their vacation when Raghava asks Mythu how Visrava saw his mother's reflection and how he became a monster from being innocent only after getting the mirror and asked the question that 'Is his monstrous nature his own or his mother's?, revealing that Visrava's mother's spirit was the reflection Visrava was seeing the whole time.

== Cast ==
- Bellamkonda Sai Sreenivas as Raghava
- Anupama Parameswaran as Mythili, Raghava’s love-interest
- Sandy as Visravaputra
- Sudharshan as Sumith, Raghava’s bestfriend
- Tanikella Bharani as Bhushana Varma, Visravaputra’s teacher
- Hyper Aadi as Vihari
- Srikanth Iyengar as Murugan
- Makarand Deshpande as Swamiji
- Prema as Visravaputra’s mother
- Sunil Reddy as Surendhar, the KDA Chemical factory manager
- Anantha Prabhu as Visravaputra’s father
- Dr. Bhadram as Athreya, Murugan’s assistant
- Baby Ashvika as Moksha, one of the tourists and Raghava's neighbour
- Srinivas Vadlamani as Viswas Kumar, Raghava and Mythili’s boss
- Thanuja Madhurapanthula as Vedavati, Visravaputra’s rival
- Alapati Lakshmi as Vedavati’s mother
- Srinivas Bogireddy as Raghava’s father

== Music ==
The background score and the film soundtrack were composed by Chaitan Bharadwaj. Suhas Sistu of the Hans India, described Bharadwaj's melodious track as a "blend of modern beats with an orchestral touch, which feels both fresh and timeless." He also praised Purna Chari's lyrics, expressing how it beautifully articulated the love and chemistry between the hero and the heroine.

Track listing
No.	Title	Lyrics	Singer(s)	Length
1.	"Undipove Naathone"	Purna Chari	Javed Ali	3:03
2.	"Needi Naadi O Chiru Lokam"	Purna Chari	S. P. Charan	3:09
3.	"Dheeroddharanam"	Shubham Vishwanath	Sweekar Agasthi	4:17
4.	"Kishkindhapuri Theme"	–	–	2:57
Total length:				13:26

== Release ==
Kishkindhapuri was released on 12 September 2025 and OTT release to 24.Oct.2025 The satellite television and digital streaming rights were acquired by Zee Telugu, Zee Tamil and ZEE5 respectively.

== Reception ==
Writing for The Times of India, Shreya Varanasi rated the film 3 out of 5 and stated that the film is "a decent attempt that delivers on suspense and performances but falls short with its emotional depth, pacing, and technical execution". BH Harsh of Cinema Express too gave the same rating and praised the storytelling and direction of Koushik Pegallapati. Telangana Today praised the story writing, lead actors' performances, background score and cinematography. The Hindu too appreciated the actors' performance while being critical towards the screenplay and execution.

== Box office ==
The film was Srinivas's first commercial success at the box office in six years, since Ramesh Varma's Telugu adaptation of Ratsasan, Rakshasudu.
