= Mallepuvvu =

- Promotional poster
- Directed by: V. Samudra
- Written by: Vemagiri (dialogues)
- Screenplay by: V. Samudra
- Story by: Ramesh Varma; V. Samudra
- Produced by: Mohan Vadlapatla
- Starring: Bhumika; Murali Krishna; V. Samudra
- Cinematography: Anil Bandari
- Edited by: Chandu; Nandamuri Hari
- Music by: Ilayaraaja
- Production company: Sri Samudra Silver Screens
- Release date: 19 September 2008
- Country: India
- Language: Telugu

Mallepuvu (transl. Gilliflower) is a 2008 Indian Telugu-language film directed by V. Samudra. The film stars himself, Bhumika and Murali Krishna who debuts in the lead role. The film's story is inspired by the Iranian film Baran (2001) and Gumrah (1993), which itself was a freemake of the television mini-series Bangkok Hilton (1989).

== Cast ==
- Bhumika Chawla as Malleswari "Malli" Kanneganti
- Murali Krishna as Koti
- V. Samudra as Suri
- Suman Setty as Koti's friend
- RK as Construction site worker
- Sukumar as Koti's friend
- Sameer as Police Inspector
- Hemasundar
- Tilak
- Venu Madhav
- Kovai Sarala as Construction site worker
- Abhinayashree as Rathalu
- Geetha Singh as Construction site worker
- Telangana Shakuntala
- Madhusudhan Rao as Malleswari's uncle
- Farjana as an item number in "Vasthaavaa Naatho"

== Production ==
Murali Krishna, who played a villain role in Oka Oorilo (2005), made his lead debut through this film.

== Soundtrack ==
The music was composed by Ilayaraaja.

The album has 9 tracks.

No.	Title	Artist(s)	Length
1.	"Malle Puvvulo"	Shreya Ghoshal, Karthik
2.	"Lokam"	Tippu
3.	"Gajula"	Manjari
4.	"Suvvu Suvvi"	Bhavatharini
5.	"Chandamama"	Shreya Ghoshal, Ilaiyaraaja
6.	"Chirugaali"	Vijay Yesudas
7.	"Hero Nenochane"	Tippu
8.	"Vasthaavaa Naatho"	Malathy Lakshman
9.	"Theme Music"	Ilaiyaraaja

== Reception ==
A critic from Bangalore Mirror wrote that "This movie is refreshing on two counts: After a long time, a heroine gets some screen space to act. Secondly, the plot has some interesting twists to sustain interest, especially in the first half". A critic from Telugucinema.com wrote that "Mallepuvvu is a clean movie with a story different from the routine. Good music, excellent rerecording, and good performances hold audiences' interest in the film".
