= Kavacham (2018 film) =

2018 action thriller film by Sreenivas Mamilla

- Theatrical release poster
- Directed by: Sreenivas Mamilla
- Screenplay by: Sreenivas Mamilla
- Produced by: Chaganti Santaiah
- Starring: Bellamkonda Sreenivas; Neil Nitin Mukesh; Kajal Aggarwal; Mehreen Pirzada; Harshvardhan Rane
- Cinematography: Chota K. Naidu
- Edited by: Chota K. Prasad
- Music by: S. Thaman
- Production company: Vamsadhara Creations
- Release date: 7 December 2018
- Running time: 143 minutes
- Country: India
- Language: Telugu

Kavacham (transl. Armour) is a 2018 Indian Telugu-language action thriller film directed by Sreenivas Mamilla (his directorial debut). It stars Bellamkonda Sreenivas, Neil Nitin Mukesh (his Telugu debut), Kajal Aggarwal, Mehreen Pirzada and Harshvardhan Rane. Set in Vizag, the plot revolves around a police officer, who becomes a fugitive after being framed for a kidnapping, and must race against time in order to get his name cleared and catch the actual perpetrator.

Kavacham was released on 7 December 2018, and became a commercial failure. It was later dubbed in Hindi as Inspector Vijay in 2019.

== Plot ==
Inspector Vijay saves a girl, Lavanya, from goons and learns that she is planning to elope with her boyfriend. He drops her at their rendezvous and, while waiting for the boyfriend, tells her how he fell for Samyukta, a café waitress, after she returned his lost purse. He had also fought and arrested criminal Ajay Bhupati for kidnapping a girl. However, Vijay is heartbroken when he learns that Samyukta is engaged.

When Lavanya's boyfriend fails to arrive, Vijay takes her home. The next morning, after discovering that her boyfriend has cheated on her, Vijay drops her at a bus stop, where they witness his mother's accident. At hospital, a doctor demands 50 lakh rupees for her operation. Lavanya reveals that she is the niece of billionaire Mahendra Varma and persuades Vijay to fake her kidnapping and demand 50 lakhs as ransom, claiming that her disappearance would also force her family to accept her choices. Mahendra's son Vikramaditya Varma informs the police, who accompany him to the rendezvous. Vijay cleverly obtains the ransom without revealing his identity and uses the money to save his mother. He then drops Lavanya at a bus stop and informs Mahendra. On his way home, he finds a badly injured man, Aravindh, after a car accident and sends him to hospital.

The following day, Vijay learns that Samyukta is actually Mahendra Varma's niece and that he has been framed for her kidnapping. Ajay Bhupathi secretly calls Vijay, claiming that his game is over. With help from Constable P. Sudarshan, Vijay finds and assaults Ajay, only to discover that he is not the kidnapper. He then finds the corpse of Lavanya, the girl he had saved. Pursued by the police, Vijay is rescued by Vaishnavi, Samyukta's friend. She reveals that Samyukta loves Vijay and had lied about her engagement to test his feelings. She also says Samyukta's last call came from a shopping mall. CCTV footage shows Samyukta being kidnapped, and tracing the kidnapper's vehicle leads Vijay to Aravindh Villa.

Vijay and Vaishnavi visit the villa, where photographs reveal that Aravindh is the same man Vijay sent to hospital after the accident. Aravindh had kept his phone so that his family could reach him. When Vikramaditya calls that phone, Vijay answers and identifies his mistake: he had called using the same phone Vijay had asked him to replace while collecting the ransom.

Vikramaditya confesses that Samyukta had worked as a café waitress to understand her customers' mindsets. Because Mahendra had chosen her over Vikramaditya as his company's heir, Vikramaditya plotted to kill her. He arranged her kidnapping and framed Vijay through Lavanya, his girlfriend. He also arranged his mother's attack so that Vijay would need the ransom money. Aravindh reveals that he could not kill Samyukta because she tricked him into transferring his money to her account. He left her in a secret chamber and, on Vikramaditya's orders, went to kill Lavanya, who attacked him with a stone before being killed. His injuries caused the subsequent accident. Vikramaditya then kills Aravindh and tells Vijay where Samyukta is, intending to kill her himself.

Vijay reveals that he has already rescued Samyukta and sent Vaishnavi to alert the police. However, he learns that his mother has been taken hostage. With Samyukta, he confronts Vikramaditya and his goons, rescues his mother and has Vikramaditya arrested.

During the end-credit scenes, Samyukta is declared the heir of S. company and confesses her love for Vijay.

== Cast ==
- Bellamkonda Sreenivas as Inspector Bellamkonda Vijay, an honest police officer who gets accused of kidnapping Samyukta Chaganti
- Neil Nitin Mukesh as Vikramaditya Varma, Mahendra Varma's son and Samyukta's cousin and kidnapper (Voice dubbed by Vedala Hemachandra)
- Kajal Aggarwal as Samyukta Chaganti, Mahendra Varma's niece and Vijay's love interest who gets kidnapped (Voice dubbed by Sowmya Sharma)
- Mehreen Pirzada as Lavanya, a girl Vijay meets and saves and Mahendra Varma's fake niece and Vikramaditya's girlfriend
- Harshvardhan Rane as Aravindh, Vikramaditya's Henchmen & Main Kidnapper
- Posani Krishna Murali as Chintakayala Aavesam IPS
- Mukesh Rishi as Mahendra Varma, Vikramaditya's father (Voice dubbed by RCM Raju)
- Harish Uthaman as Sarath Chandra IPS
- Kalyani Natarajan as Vijay's mother
- Apoorva Srinivasan as Vaishnavi, Samyuktha's best friend
- Satyam Rajesh as Constable P. Sudarshan, Vijay's friend
- Ajay as Ajay Bhupati
- Prabhas Sreenu as Seenu
- Prabhu as Doctor
- Brijila Ragesh as Gayathri

== Soundtrack ==
The music is composed by S. Thaman.

Kavacham (Original Motion Picture Soundtrack)

Soundtrack album by S. Thaman
- Released: 2018
- Recorded: 2017
- Genre: Feature Film Soundtrack
- Label: Aditya Music

S. Thaman chronology
Amar Akbar Anthony (2018)	Kavacham (Original Motion Picture Soundtrack) (2018)	Orange (2018)

Track List
No.	Title	Lyrics	Singer(s)	Length
1.	"Naa Aduge Padithey"	Chandrabose	Raghu Dixit	4:24
2.	"Tu Hi Mera"	Ramajogayya Sastry	Rahul Nambiar	3:47
3.	"Dulhara Dulhara"	Sri Mani	Sreenidhi Tirumala	4:49
4.	"Vasthava Pillaa"	Ramajogayya Sastry	Aditya Iyenegar, Parnika	3:44
5.	"Nalugu Pedavulu"	Chandrabose	Hanuman, Aditi Bavaraju	3:50
Total length:				19:57

== Production ==
Producer chaganti santaiah announced that he would produce Bellamkonda Sreenivas's next film under his newly created production house, Vamsadhara Creations. Kajal Aggarwal was cast as the lead heroine. Naveen Chandra was originally cast as the main antagonist for the film, but was subsequently replaced by Hindi actor, Neil Nitin Mukesh.

== Release ==
The film was released on 7 December 2018. It was also later dubbed and released in Hindi as Inspector Vijay on YouTube by RKD Studios on 28 April 2019.

=== Critical reception ===
Sangeetha Devi Dundoo from The Hindu wrote that "A sliver of a story lies buried under the painstaking efforts to create a star aura" and criticises the film's reliance on over used cliches.

Srivastan Nadadhur, from The Times of India, gave it a 2/5, stating that "Even if the story seems intriguing on a certain level, the filmmaker Sreenivas Mamilla seems more interested in making the hero wear smart tees, romance the ladies in scenic locations and have him thrash the goons to a pulp sequence after sequence." He wrote that "Kavacham should serve as an ideal reminder to Bellamkonda Sai Sreenivas that he needs to go beyond blazers, uniforms and abroad shoots to make a good film."

Manoj Kumar R from The Indian Express gave it a 1/5: "As far as the story goes, Kavacham doesn't have anything fresh to offer. It is just a star-vehicle that is intended to boost the young career of Bellamkonda Sai Sreenivas." He remarks that the heroines, Kajal and Mehreen, are not much more than "damsels in distress" and that the character of Neil Nitin Mukesh eventually "is reduced to nothing but a clown."
