= Jaffa (2013 film) =

Telugu-language black comedy film

- Directed by: Vennela Kishore
- Written by: Vennela Kishore
- Produced by: Ramesh Varma
- Starring: Brahmanandam; Ali; Fish Venkat; Thagubothu Ramesh; Dhanaraj; Sravan
- Cinematography: Kiran
- Edited by: Kotagiri Venkateswara Rao
- Music by: Anoop Rubens
- Distributed by: Kiran Studios Pvt. Ltd.
- Release date: 29 March 2013
- Running time: 125 mins
- Country: India
- Language: Telugu
- Budget: ₹15 million (US$160,000)

Jaffa is a 2013 Indian Telugu-language black comedy film written and directed by Vennela Kishore. The film stars comedian Brahmanandam as the main protagonist for the second time in his career. The films also star other comedians like Ali, Thagubothu Ramesh, Fish Venkat, and even Kishore. The film is produced by Ramesh Varma, with Anoop Rubens scoring the music. Brahmanandam was supposed to direct the film on a script written by Kishore, but eventually he opted out and handed the project to Kishore due to hectic schedules. The film, one of the most awaited Telugu films in recent times, was originally scheduled to release in 2012, but after several delays, it released on 29 March 2013.

== Plot ==
The movie starts with Jasmine Falguna, aka Jaffa (Brahmanandam), a former software engineer, narrating his story when he was in jail. He befriends all the prisoners in the jail, and subsequently becomes their leader. When prisoners face problems, Jaffa is the one who solves their problems. Eventually, he also befriends the jailer Nikki (Vennela Kishore). Nikki has been trying to get a terrorist in his custody to speak, but Nikki's torture eventually led to the terrorist hanging himself, putting Nikki at risk. Nikki pleads for help from Jaffa, who is still in jail, to get his job back. So, Jaffa and Nikki together plan for Jaffa to escape from the jail. In the process, Father Suyodhana (Raghu Babu) is to be killed, and his corpse is to be placed in the coffin, and by the time the coffin is taken for burial, Jaffa will go inside the coffin. After the burial, Nikki will come to the graveyard to dig up the coffin and rescue Jaffa.

The movie moves to the present day, where Jaffa is in the coffin. It is then revealed that Nikki died when he tried to kill Father Suyodhana with poisoned milk and ended up in the coffin. Jaffa, now trapped in the coffin, has no one to help. Then he remembers that Nikki told him to call his friend Vishal if Nikki is not reachable. So, Jaffa takes Nikki's phone to look for Vishal's number, only to turn the phone on and notice that the phone is configured to Hindi script, which Jaffa cannot read. Jaffa takes out Nikki's other phone, only to see that it has no battery. Jaffa now has only one option, considering he can't read Hindi: Call every number on Nikki's phone.

Meanwhile, the police are searching for Jaffa, who is missing, and CBI Officer Katragadda (Ali) is on a mission to look for Jaffa. To get more information about Jaffa, Katragadda finds the three witnesses, who were prisoners in the same jail, but all three kill themselves before Katragadda can interrogate them. The rest of the story deals with whether Katragadda will catch Jaffa, and whether Jaffa will be rescued from the coffin.

== Cast ==
- Brahmanandam as Jasmine Falguna/Jaffa
- Dhanaraj as Sujith
- Vennela Kishore as Nikhil
- Shankar Melkote as Melkoti, Jaffa's Boss
- Ali as Detective Tapaswi Katragadda
- Thagubothu Ramesh as Graveyard Caretaker
- Fish Venkat as Fish Venkat, Police Informant
- Saptagiri as Saptagiri, Prison Mate
- Raghu Babu as Father Suyodhana
- Venu Madhav as Alladdin
- Ahuti Prasad
- Giridhar as Giri, Prison Mate
- Raghu Karumanchi as Prison Mate
- Venu Yeldandi as Venu Bongula
- Sravan
- Harish Koyalagundla as Koyala
- Chalaki Chanti

== Reception ==
The film received negative reviews from critics. The Deccan Chronicle said, "Overall, Bramhanandam's Jaffa is a disappointing film".

The film was mainly criticised for its direction, screenplay, and its dragging story. Nevertheless, Brahmanandam's performance was appreciated by most critics.
