= Chatrapathi (2023 film) =

2023 Indian film by V. V. Vinayak

- Theatrical release poster
- Directed by: V. V. Vinayak
- Screenplay by: A. Mahadev
- Dialogues by: Mayur Puri
- Story by: V. Vijayendra Prasad
- Based on: Chatrapathi (2005) by S. S. Rajamouli
- Produced by: Jayantilal Gada; Dhaval Gada; Akshay Gada
- Starring: Bellamkonda Sai Sreenivas; Nushrat Bharucha; Sharad Kelkar
- Cinematography: Nizar Shafi
- Edited by: Niranjan Devaramane
- Music by: Score: Ravi Basrur; Songs: Tanishk Bagchi
- Production company: Pen Studios
- Release date: 12 May 2023
- Running time: 124 minutes
- Country: India
- Language: Hindi

Chatrapathi is a 2023 Indian Hindi-language action drama film directed by V. V. Vinayak and produced by Jayantilal Gada of Pen India Limited. It is a remake of the Prabhas and S.S Rajamouli 2005 Telugu film of the same name. The film stars Bellamkonda Sreenivas in his Hindi film debut playing the titular role with Nushrat Bharucha, Bhagyashree, Sharad Kelkar, Freddy Daruwala, Karan Singh Chhabra, Rajendra Gupta and Rajesh Sharma play supporting roles.

Chatrapathi was released on 12 May 2023 to negative reviews from critics. The film was a box office bomb.

== Plot ==
Shivaji is a refugee and the adopted son of Parvati, who sets out to find his mother after being separated by his jealous brother and Parvati's biological son Ashok (Karan Singh Chhabra) years ago in Pakistan. While searching for his mother, Shivaji meets Sapna, who also helps him in his crusade, and the two fall for each other. Meanwhile, Shivaji battles against Bhairav and Bhavani for harming his fellow refugees, and they all start referring to him as Chatrapathi. Ashok also learns that Shivaji is alive and joins hands with Shivaji's enemies to finish him. Despite this, Shivaji finishes his enemies and he reunites with Parvati. Ashok apologizes for his mistakes after realizing that Shivaji helped him and Parvati and the family lead a happy life.

== Cast ==
- Bellamkonda Sreenivas as Shivaji/Chatrapathi (voice dubbed by Sachin Gole)
- Nushrratt Bharuccha as Sapna
- Karan Singh Chhabra as Ashok, Shivaji's step-brother
- Sharad Kelkar as Bhavani Prasad Solanki
- Bhagyashree as Parvati, Shivaji's step-mother
- Amith Nair as Kathiya
- Freddy Daruwala as Bhairav Solanki
- Rajendra Gupta
- Rajesh Sharma as Kanthilal
- Abrar Zahoor
- Ishita Raj as dancer, in song Bareilly ke Bazaar
- Sahil Vaid
- Shivam Patil
- Swapnil
- Ashish Singh
- Mohammad Monajir
- Auroshika Dey
- Vedika Nawani
- Sudhakar Mishra
- Jason

== Production ==
=== Filming ===
Principal photography for the film commenced in 2021. The director of the original film, S. S. Rajamouli, came on set to give the muhurat shot.

== Music ==
Chatrapathi

Soundtrack album by Tanishk Bagchi
- Released: 9 May 2023
- Recorded: 2021–2022
- Genre: Feature film soundtrack
- Length: 12:29
- Language: Hindi
- Label: Times Music

Tanishk Bagchi chronology
| Gumraah (2023) | Chatrapathi (2023) | Jogira Sara Ra Ra (2023) |

The music for the composed by Tanishk Bagchi.

| No. | Title | Lyrics | Music | Singer(s) | Length |
|---|---|---|---|---|---|
| 1. | "Bareilly Ke Bazaar" | Mayur Puri | Tanishk Bagchi | Sunidhi Chauhan, Dev Negi | 3:24 |
| 2. | "Window Taley" | Shabbir Ahmed | Tanishk Bagchi | Dev Negi, Jyotica Tangri | 2:54 |
| 3. | "Gamey Gamey" | Mayur Puri | Tanishk Bagchi | Armaan Malik, Zahrah S Khan | 2:58 |
| 4. | "Shukriya" | Mayur Puri | Tanishk Bagchi | Ash King, Palak Muchhal | 3:13 |
| Total length: | | | | | 12:29 |

== Release ==
Chatrapthi was released theatrically on 12 May 2023. The film was a box office bomb.
