= Nizar Shafi =

Indian cinematographer, film director

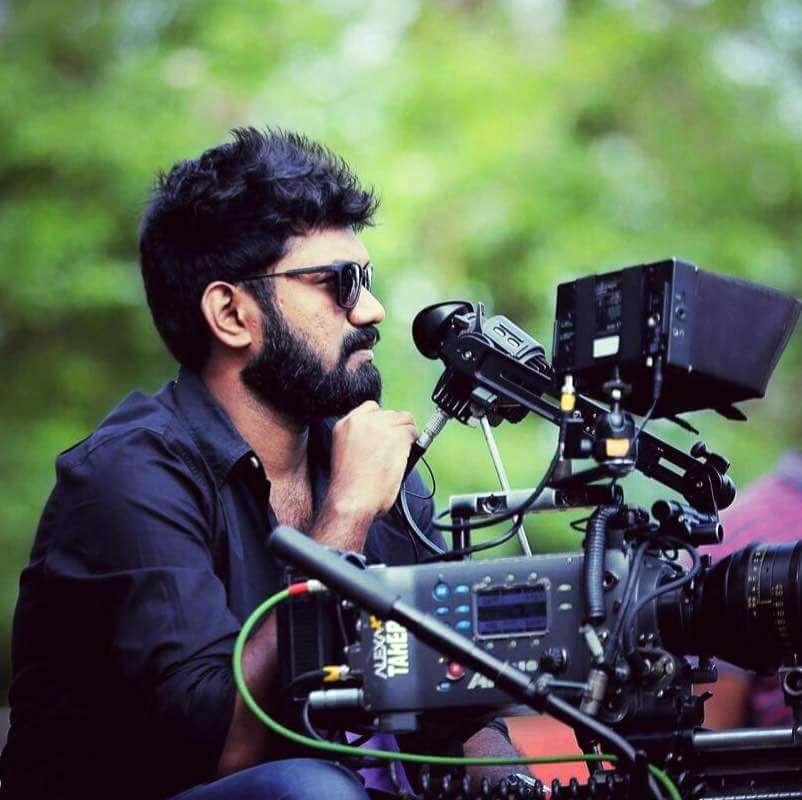
- Nizar Shafi at work
- Born: Nizarali Shafiulla; Chennai, Tamil Nadu, India
- Occupations: Cinematographer; film director
- Years active: 2013–present
- Spouse: Nebu N. Babu (m. 2016)
- Children: 1

Nizar Shafi is an Indian cinematographer who works in Telugu and Tamil films. He has received critical acclaim for his work in Sutta Kadhai, Naaigal Jaakirathai, Bhale Bhale Magadivoy and Nenu Local. He debuted as a director with the Tamil-Telugu bilingual film Seven.

== Career ==
Nizar completed his diploma in cinematography from M.G.R. Government Film and Television Training Institute, Chennai. He assisted Sakthi Saravanan in Saroja and Mankatha, he also worked as an associate cinematographer in Enthiran. His first independent movie as a cinematographer was Sutta Kadhai (2013). His movie Naaigal Jaakirathai (2014) received positive reviews from critics, and was one of the most profitable Tamil cinema (Kollywood) ventures of 2014. His movie Bhale Bhale Magadivoy (2015) became the fourth-highest grossing Telugu film of all time at the United States box office, where it was released on 115 screens.

== Filmography ==
| Year | Title | Language | Notes |
|---|---|---|---|
| 2013 | Sutta Kadhai | Tamil | |
| 2014 | Nalanum Nandhiniyum | Tamil | |
| 2014 | Naaigal Jaakirathai | Tamil | |
| 2015 | Bhale Bhale Magadivoy | Telugu | Debut in Telugu cinema |
| 2017 | Nenu Local | Telugu | |
| 2017 | Mahanubhavudu | Telugu | |
| 2018 | Shailaja Reddy Alludu | Telugu | |
| 2019 | Seven | Telugu | Also director |
| 2019 | Seven | Tamil | Also director |
| 2023 | Chatrapathi | Hindi | Debut in Hindi cinema |
| 2023 | Mr. Pregnant | Telugu | |
| 2025 | Mazaka | Telugu | |
