= 3 Monkeys (2026 film) =

- Directed by: Abbas–Mustan
- Screenplay by: Deepak Venkateshan
- Dialogues by: Anukalp Goswami
- Story by: Deepak Venkateshan
- Produced by: Allarakha Vohra; Faruk Vohra; Sayeed Vohra; Ajay Kumar Kanojiya
- Starring: Arjun Rampal; Vishal Jethwa; Mustafa Burmawala; Tenzing Dalha; Priya Prakash Varrier
- Cinematography: Ravi Yadav
- Edited by: Hussain A. Burmawala
- Music by: Tanishk Bagchi
- Production companies: AJ Film Entertainment World; AV Picture
- Release date: 4 December 2026
- Country: India
- Language: Hindi

3 Monkeys is an upcoming Indian Hindi-language heist thriller film directed by the duo Abbas–Mustan. The film is produced by Allarakha Vohra and Sayeed Vohra under the banner AV Picture. The film stars Arjun Rampal, Vishal Jethwa, Mustafa Burmawala, Priya Prakash Varrier and Tenzing Dalha.The film is scheduled to release on 4 December 2026.

== Cast ==
- Arjun Rampal as Sanjay
- Vishal Jethwa as Amar
- Mustafa Burmawala as Akbar
- Tenzing Dalha as Anthony
- Priya Prakash Varrier
- Ivan Rodrigues as Ravindra Jacob
- Tunisha Sharma
- Rajesh Khattar
- Abrar Zahoor
- Anant Mahadevan
- Denzil Smith

== Production ==
Principal Photography began on 13 November 2021 in Mumbai.

== Release ==
After facing several delays, 3 Monkeys is scheduled to release on 4 December 2026.
