= Ride (2009 film) =

- Directed by: Ramesh Varma
- Written by: Shashank Vennelakanti (Dialogues)
- Screenplay by: Ramesh Varma
- Story by: Ramesh Varma
- Produced by: Bellamkonda Suresh
- Starring: Nani; Tanish; Aksha Pardasany; Shweta Basu Prasad
- Cinematography: Shyam K. Naidu
- Edited by: Marthand K. Venkatesh
- Music by: Hemachandra
- Production company: Sri Saiganesh Productions
- Release date: 5 June 2009
- Running time: 149 minutes
- Country: India
- Language: Telugu
- Box office: ₹8 crore distributors' share

Ride is a 2009 Indian Telugu-language action romance film directed by Ramesh Varma and produced by Bellamkonda Suresh. The film stars Nani, Tanish, Aksha Pardasany, and Shweta Basu Prasad. The music was composed by Hemachandra with cinematography by Shyam K. Naidu and editing by Marthand K. Venkatesh. The film was released on 5 June 2009 and was a box office success collecting a distributors' share of ₹8 crore at the box office.

== Plot ==
Arjun, an engineering college student, longs for a bicycle. However, his father does not fulfill his wish. Mahesh, hailing from a middle-class family, has two sisters. His father is retired, and his family survives on his pension. Mahesh wants to help his father and searches for a job. He gets a job in Kapil Chit Funds as a collection agent, but on the condition that he get a bicycle. Mahesh's mother sells off some silver articles, and he purchases a bicycle.

Mahesh's father suffers a stroke, and Mahesh loses his bicycle while bringing medicine to him. Though he lodges a police complaint, it is of no avail. Mahesh goes jobless without the bicycle. One day Mahesh finds Arjun riding his bicycle, and they fight with each other for it. Mahesh learns that Arjun has purchased the bicycle in a black market after winning a bicycle race. They finally come to an understanding on the advice of a pandit to use the bicycle to suit the convenience of each other by dividing the day. They keep their promise and use the bicycle judiciously.

One day, some goons attack Arjun and gravely injure him. Mahesh, who finds Arjun in an unconscious state, admits him in the hospital and informs the latter's parents. After that incident, Arjun and Mahesh become friends. At this juncture, their bicycle goes missing again. Gaja, the person who stole their bicycle, calls them and plays tricks upon them. Arjun and Mahesh learn that Gaja is the brother of Arjun's girlfriend Puja and is in love with Mahesh's girlfriend Rani. Gaja tries to take revenge against the two men by playing with their bicycle.

In the climax, Arjun decides to participate in a motorcycle race and get the bicycle as a prize to present it to Mahesh as it is a necessity for him. Mahesh too wants to get back the bicycle from Gaja as Arjun has a passion for the bicycle. Each of them try in their own way and get two bicycles. The film ends on a happy note as the problem gets solved, but they keep exchanging their bicycles as usual and continuing their friendship.

== Cast ==
- Nani as Arjun
- Tanish as Mahesh
- Aksha Pardasany as Puja
- Swetha Basu Prasad as Rani
- Brahmanandam as Subbabhai Lambani / Subba Rao
- Adarsh Balakrishna as Gaja
- Ahuti Prasad as Arjun's father
- Sudha as Arjun's mother
- Y. Kasi Viswanath as Mahesh's father
- Tulasi as Mahesh's mother
- Praveen as Mahesh's friend
- Satyam Rajesh as Chaiti
- Narasimha as Arjun's friend
- Shyamala as Rani's friend
- Hema as Arundhati
- Dharmavarapu Subramanyam as Traffic police officer
- Navdeep as Raj (cameo appearance)

== Production ==
This was the second film of all four of the lead actors.

== Soundtrack ==
The music was composed by singer Hemachandra, and the lyrics were written by Bhaskarabhatla and Ramajogayya Sastry. The audio launch was held on 14 May 2009 at Hotel Greenpark in Hyderabad.

Track list
No.	Title	Lyrics	Singer(s)	Length
1.	"Freedom Rangula Lokam"	Bhaskarabhatla	Clinton Cerejo, Sravana Bhargavi, Bhargavi Pillai	4:08
2.	"Edo Edo"	Bhaskarabhatla	Hemachandra, Sravana Bhargavi, Geetha Madhuri	5:13
3.	"Ride"	Ramajogayya Sastry	Deepu, Babloo	4:36
4.	"Naa Manasantha"	Bhaskarabhatla	Hemachandra, Suchitra	5:31
5.	"Mahive"	Ramajogayya Sastry	Hemachandra, Tippu, Sravana Bhargavi	4:40
6.	"Ride Theme Music"		Hemachandra, Sravana Bhargavi, Geetha Madhuri, Pooja	2:13
Total length:				26:38

== Release and reception ==
The film was initially scheduled to release on 28 May 2009 coinciding with N. T. R.'s birthday, but the release was delayed to 5 June 2009.

Jeevi of Idlebrain.com rated the film three-and-a-quarter out of five and wrote that "Ramesh Varma did a better job compared to his last film, but it is not good enough!"

== Awards ==
- Fight masters Ram and Lakshman won Nandi Award for Best Action Sequences.
