= Veera (2011 film) =

- Theatrical release poster
- Directed by: Ramesh Varma
- Written by: Paruchuri Brothers
- Produced by: Ganesh Indukuri
- Starring: Ravi Teja; Kajal Aggarwal; Taapsee
- Cinematography: Chota K. Naidu
- Edited by: Gautham Raju
- Music by: S. Thaman
- Production company: Sanvi Productions
- Release date: 20 May 2011
- Running time: 165 minutes
- Country: India
- Language: Telugu

Veera: An Arrow Head of Action is a 2011 Telugu-language action comedy film, produced by Ganesh Indukuri under Sanvi Productions banner and directed by Ramesh Varma. It stars Ravi Teja, Kajal Aggarwal, and Taapsee Pannu, with music composed by S. Thaman. The cinematography was performed by Chota K. Naidu, and the film was released on 20 May 2011. The film had completed 50 days in 60 centres and a 100-day run at the box office, according to Zee 24 Ghantalu. The film was released in Tamil as Veeraiyaah, in Hindi as The Great Veera, and in Malayalam, Bhojpuri, and Hindustani under the same name.

== Plot ==
Shyamsunder is an honest police officer who comes into conflict with the local don, Dhanraj. The goons kill Shyam's son, Moksha, and Shyam does not inform his family about the murder but fears the villains may kill his daughter also. Dhanraj threatens Shyam's family so the police department arranges for an officer to provide security for them. Deva arrives, saves Shyam from Dhanraj's men, and introduces himself as the security officer. Shyam's family still believes that their son is in the boarding school and waits for his call on a Sunday, but instead, they are told their son went on an excursion. Shyam gets tensed and reveals everything to Deva. When he goes to drop Anjali (ACP's daughter) at school with Tiger, with whom he shares his room, he meets Aiki, who later falls for him.

Shyam's wife Sathya dislikes Deva and doesn't want him involved with her family while Aiki falls in love with him. Shyam learns that Deva is not the security officer appointed by the police department. It is revealed that Deva is Veera, a person who is like a god to the whole village. He kills the security officer Deva (who works for Dhanraj) and replaces him. Sathya is his step-sister. In the pre-interval scene, Dhanraj comes to kill Shyam and his family, and Veera bashes them badly and protects his sister's family. But when Dhanraj tries to kill them, he gets killed by Pedda Rayudu who suddenly arrives and introduces himself as the nemesis of Veera and shoots him. Veera loses consciousness. A police officer sends Veera to Shyam's family. His past is soon reveled.

Past: Veera was a powerful and kind-hearted landlord of a village. Every villager loved him very much. He lived with his younger brother, friends, and his beautiful wife Chitra. But there was another landlord, Pedda Rayudu, who wanted to vacate the whole village to build a factory. But Veera opposes him. Pedda tries to torture the villagers and Veera beats him badly. Veera's younger brother marries the daughter of the officer, who later sends Veera to Shyam's family. Embarrassed, the wife of Pedda kills herself. Pedda became angry and killed Veera's entire family, including Chitti who was pregnant, when Veera was not present. When Veera finds out, he killed all of Pedda's henchmen. Pedda was supposed to die in an explosion, but he survives. Veera doesn't know that Pedda had survived. Sathya blames Veera for the death of their family. That's why Sathya disliked Veera. Later, Veera comes to the city to save his step-sister's family.

Present: Pedda challenges Veera and after a long fight between the two, Veera kills Pedda and takes his revenge. Then Aiki proposes to Veera and he agrees. And he reunites with his sister happily.

== Cast ==
- Ravi Teja as Veera Venkata Sathyanarayana / Deva (Fake)
- Kajal Aggarwal as Chitra "Chitti"
- Kick Shaam as Shyamsunder
- Taapsee as Aiki
- Sridevi Vijayakumar as Satya
- Brahmanandam as Tiger Apparao
- Roja as Arundathi, Satya's mother
- Pradeep Rawat as Pedda Venkata Rayudu
- Rahul Dev as Dhanraj
- Ali as Pataas
- Nassar as Satya Narayana Murthy, Veera's father
- Charan Raj as Jayaraj
- Vijayakumar as Kalki Narayana Murthy
- Paruchuri Venkateswara Rao as Venkatachalam, Shyam's father
- Chandra Mohan as Chandram, Chitra's father
- Sudha as Pilli Nirmala Simha, Shyam's mother
- Telangana Shakuntala as Shakuntala, Chitti's grandmother
- Annapoorna as Rajyalakshmi, Satya's grandmother
- Nagababu as DGP K. Vijaykumar
- Ajay as Deva (Corrupt Police Officer)(Original)
- Krishnudu as Anji
- Praveen as Veera's friend
- Divya Vani as Nippuramba (Pedda Venkat Rayudu's wife)
- Venu Madhav as Balaji
- Prabhakar as Rudramanaidu Brother in law of Pedda Venkata Rayudu #1
- Dharmavarapu Subramanyam as Subramanyam, Aiki's father
- Chalapathi Rao as Krishnam Raju
- Subbaraju as Vijay Srinivas
- Pragathi as Lalita, Veera's mother
- Hema as Sujatha, Aiki's mother
- Srinivasa Reddy as Ramakrishna
- Fish Venkat as Dhanraj's henchman
- Master Bharath as Aiki's brother
- Supreeth Reddy as Katamarayudu

== Production ==
In January 2010, the first look of Veera was released by Sanvi Productions, the producers of the film, with Ravi Teja in the lead role and Ramesh Varma as the director. Furthermore, a leading technical crew was announced with Devi Sri Prasad as a music composer, Chota K. Naidu as cinematographer, Marthand K. Venkatesh as editor and the Paruchuri brothers as writers. The casting process began in June 2010 with Anushka Shetty was signed on to play the lead female role with Taapsee Pannu selected to play a supporting role in the film. Anushka walked out of the project before filming began and was subsequently replaced by Kajal Aggarwal, whilst Devi Sri Prasad was also replaced by Thaman. Shaam and Sridevi Vijayakumar were also signed on to play a supporting role in the film.

After further delays, the film began its first schedule in November 2010 at Madhapur Art Gallery in Hyderabad. The filming was wrapped in May 2011 at Switzerland after shooting a couple of romantic songs.

== Soundtrack ==
Veera

Soundtrack album by S. Thaman
- Released: 7 May 2011
- Recorded: 2011
- Genre: Feature film soundtrack
- Length: 31:01
- Language: Telugu
- Label: Aditya Music
- Producer: S. Thaman

S. Thaman chronology
Sabash Sariyana Potti (2011)	Veera (2011)	Kanchana (2011)

The audio release of the film was done in a very simple manner. Music director S. Thaman, director Gopichand Malineni, Aditya Music CEO Dayanand, and B.A. Raju was present at the function. S. Thaman released the CD and handed it over to Gopichand Malineni.

S. Thaman said that since the entire unit is present in Switzerland as of now busy with the shooting he was organizing this audio release and songs in the movie are according to the body language of Ravi Teja and also informed that NTR old classic Mavilla thota kada was remixed in the movie according to the requirement.

The movie has celebrated its triple platinum disc function in Taj Deccan. Ravi Teja, Brahmanandam, Sridevi Vijaykumar, Ali, Chota K Naidu, Ram-Lakshman, Dayanand, S. Thaman and others were present at the function.

Track listing
No.	Title	Lyrics	Singer(s)	Length
1.	"Ekkadekkada"	Ramajogayya Sastry	Ramya NSK	4:29
2.	"O Meri Bhavri"	Rahman	S. Thaman & Bindu Mahima	4:42
3.	"Chitti Chitti"	Bhaskarabhatla	Karthik, Geetha Madhuri	4:30
4.	"Chinnari (Montage Bit)"	Sira Sri	Karthik	2:36
5.	"Hossanam"	Bhaskarabhatla	Karthik (Uncredited), Roshini, Ranjith	5:28
6.	"Mavilla (Remix)"	Bandaru Danayya Kavi	Ganga, Khushi Murali	4:55
7.	"Veera Veera"	Abhinaya Srinivas	Ranina Reddy, M. L. R. Karthikeyan, Chorus	4:18
Total length:				31:01

== Reception ==
Veera received mixed to negative reviews from critics. A critic from The Times of India gave the film a rating of 2/5 and wrote that "After testing new waters previously, in “Veera” we see actor Ravi Teja treading the tried-and-tested formula film path yet again. “Veera” will only appeal to the front-bench fans of Ravi Teja". A critic from Rediff wrote: "tedious watch". A critic from Sify wrote: "Veera is only fine in parts wherever Ravi Teja is shown in a mass dimension. There is unnecessary violence and the screenplay is hackneyed. Director Ramesh Varma was purely focusing to showcase Ravi Teja on the lines of a superhero but he failed miserably".
