= Bellamkonda Sai Sreenivas =

Indian film actor

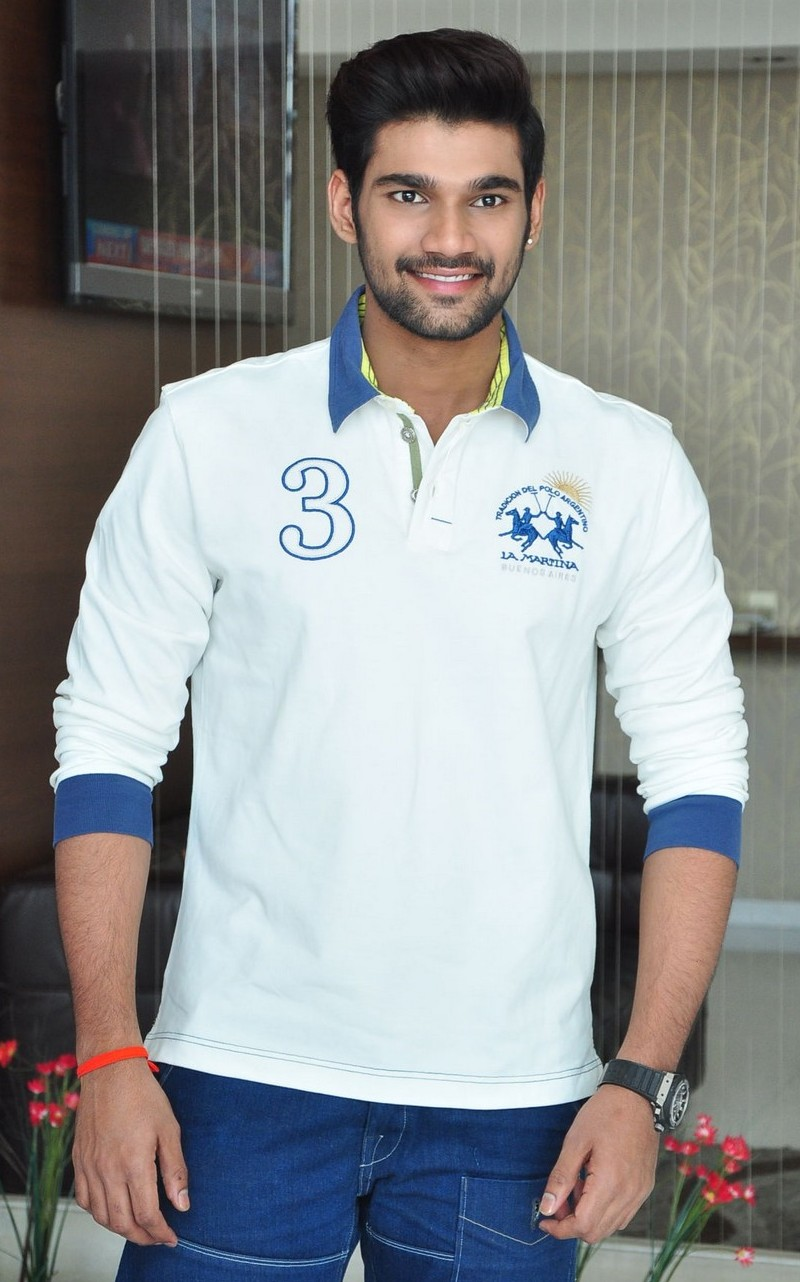
- Sreenivas in 2016
- Born: Bellamkonda Sai Sreenivas; 3 January 1993 (age 33); Guntur, Andhra Pradesh, India
- Occupation: Actor
- Years active: 2010–present
- Spouse: Kavya Reddy (m. 2026)
- Parent: Bellamkonda Suresh
- Relatives: Bellamkonda Ganesh Babu (brother)

Bellamkonda Sai Sreenivas (born 3 January 1993) is an Indian actor and the son of film producer Bellamkonda Suresh. He made his acting debut in the action drama Alludu Seenu (2014), and has since starred in the crime thriller Rakshasudu (2019), and the horror thriller Kishkindhapuri (2025).

== Career ==
Bellamkonda Sai Sreenivas is the son of Telugu film producer Bellamkonda Suresh. He finished the acting course at Lee Strasberg Theatre and Film Institute in Los Angeles (USA) and Barry John Acting Studio in Mumbai. He also underwent professional training in Vietnam for martial arts and stunts. His younger brother Ganesh Bellamkonda is also a Telugu actor.

Sreenivas made his debut in the 2014 Telugu film Alludu Seenu opposite Samantha Ruth Prabhu along with Prakash Raj which won him Filmfare Award for Best Male Debut – South. After the success of the film, he starred in Speedunnodu, a Telugu remake of the Tamil superhit film Sundarapandian, along with Sonarika Bhadoria and Prakash Raj. He also featured in Jaya Janaki Nayaka opposite Rakul Preet Singh, Saakshyam opposite Pooja Hegde, Kavacham opposite Kajal Aggarwal and Mehreen Pirzada and Sita again opposite Kajal Aggarwal. He also starred in Rakshasudu, the Telugu remake of the Tamil blockbuster film Ratsasan, opposite Anupama Parameswaran. In 2021, he starred in Alludu Adhurs with Nabha Natesh and Anu Emmanuel.

In November 2020, the Hindi remake of the Telugu film Chatrapathi (2005) was announced, which would mark his Bollywood debut. V. V. Vinayak is signed as its director. In August 2021, he announced his next film titled Stuartpuram Donga. The movie chronicles the life of notorious thief Tiger Nageswara Rao of Stuartpuram.

In 2025 he worked in, Bhairavam co-starring Aditi Shankar and directed by Vijay Kanakamedala.

== Personal life ==
Bellamkonda Sai Sreenivas tied the knot with his girlfriend Kavya Reddy in an intimate ceremony at Karnataka Bhavan in Tirumala on 29 April 2026 and was attended by close family members, friends and a few special guests.

== Filmography ==
Key
†	Denotes films that have not yet been released

- All films are in the Telugu language unless otherwise noted.

Year	Title	Role	Notes	Ref.
2014	Alludu Seenu	Alludu Seenu		
2016	Speedunnodu	Sobhan		
2017	Jaya Janaki Nayaka	Gagan Chakravarthy		
2018	Saakshyam	Viswa		
2018	Kavacham	Inspector Vijay		
2019	Sita	Raghuram		
2019	Rakshasudu	Arun Kumar		
2020	Dhira	Tenali Rama	Animated film	
2021	Alludu Adhurs	Sai "Sreenu" Sreenivas		
2023	Chatrapathi	Chatrapathi / Shivaji	Hindi film	
2025	Bhairavam	Seenu		
2025	Kishkindhapuri	Raghava		
2026	Haindava †	K. Balaram IPS	Filming	
TBA	Tyson Naidu †	Tyson Naidu	Filming	

== Awards and nominations ==
List of awards and nominations
Year	Award	Category	Film	Result	Ref.
2015	Filmfare Awards	Filmfare Award for Best Male Debut – South	Alludu Seenu	Won	

== See also ==
- List of Telugu film actors
- List of Indian male film actors
