= Lee (2017 film) =

- Directed by: H. M. Srinandan
- Written by: H. M. Srinandan
- Produced by: Sarathy Sathish; Darshan Krishna; Vinay S. B.
- Starring: Sumanth Shailendra; Nabha Natesh; Sneha Namdhani
- Cinematography: M. U. Nandakumar
- Music by: Gurukiran
- Production company: Vivid Dreams Entertainment
- Distributed by: Jayanna Films
- Release date: 13 January 2017
- Running time: 134 minutes
- Country: India
- Language: Kannada

Lee is a 2017 Indian-Kannada-language action film written by H. M. Srinandan. It was produced by Sarathy Sathish for Vivid Dreams Entertainment, with cinematography by Nandakumar. Its lead actors include Sumanth Shailendra and Nabha Natesh. Sneha Namdhani debuts as the second lead.

The film score was composed by Gurukiran while the soundtrack was composed by Anand Rajavikraman. The filming began in January 2016 and it was launched at the Kanteerava Indoor Stadium in Bangalore, India.

An action mobile video game, Lee Movie Game, was released as a tie-in for the film by Mobi2Fun.

== Cast ==
- Sumanth Shailendra as Charlee
- Nabha Natesh as Leela
- Sneha Namdhani
- Sadhu Kokila
- Rahul Dev
- Achyuth Kumar
- Rangayana Raghu
- Suchendra Prasad
- Chikkanna
- Tabla Nani

== Soundtrack ==
Lee

Soundtrack album by Anand Rajavikraman
- Released: December 2016
- Recorded: 2016
- Genre: Feature film soundtrack

Newcomer Anand Rajavikraman composed the soundtrack music.

All lyrics are written by Vachan Sriram.

No.	Title	Performer(s)	Length
1.	"Shuruvayitu"	Chetan Gandharva, Ananya Bhat
2.	"Shaliwahna Case"	Raja Gopalan, Manasa Holla
3.	"Edi Jagavidu"	Santhosh Venky, Sivani Saraswathalu
4.	"Thaliru Thoranadi"	Santhosh Venky, Anuradha Bhat
5.	"Bungha Bungha"	Mohana Bhogaraju, Raja Gopalan

== Critical reception ==
The Kannada movie Lee, which came out in 2017, got a proper bashing from critics. Deccan Chronicle said it's so bad that "it will drive you mad" because it's all over the place and has zero charm. The New Indian Express also gave it a thumbs down, calling it "sans any glee"—basically, no fun, no joy, nothing to keep you hooked. Deccan Herald didn't hold back either, saying it's "a mindless mish-mash"—like someone threw random stuff together and called it a film. The Times of India was a bit kinder but still gave it low marks, saying the idea was okay but the making was all wrong. Even Vijaya Karnataka joined the party, slamming it for a weak story that doesn't hit you anywhere.
