= Seven (2019 Indian film) =

2019 film directed by Nizar Shafi

- Theatrical release poster
- Directed by: Nizar Shafi
- Written by: Nizar Shafi; Ramesh Varma
- Produced by: Ramesh Varma; MS Sharavanan
- Starring: Havish; Rahman; Nandita Swetha; Regina Cassandra; Pujita Ponnada; Tridha Choudhury; Anisha Ambrose; Aditi Arya
- Cinematography: Nizar Shafi
- Edited by: Praveen K. L.
- Music by: Chaitan Bharadwaj
- Production company: Sri Green Productions
- Distributed by: Abhishek Pictures
- Release date: 5 June 2019
- Running time: 117 minutes
- Country: India
- Languages: Telugu; Tamil

Seven is a 2019 Indian mystery thriller film directed and filmed by Nizar Shafi, and produced by Ramesh Varma. Shot simultaneously in Telugu and Tamil languages, the film features Havish, Rahman, Nandita Swetha and Regina Cassandra in lead roles.

== Plot ==
While investigating an enigmatic man named Karthik, ACP Vijay Prakash, a police officer is bewildered by the conflicting statements about his identity. Three young women seem to share a mysterious connection with him and claim Karthik as their husband who has gone missing a few days/months before. An old man from an asylum claims that he knew Karthik as Krishnamurthy, who had died 30 years ago. The next day, the old man was found killed.

After the man's death, another woman called Priya appears and claims Karthik as her husband, who has been missing since the previous day. The police officers are in shock with her claim because they had arrested Karthik two days before as the suspect of the old man's murder. During the investigation, Karthik fails to recognize the other three women who claimed him as their husband.

In the next scene the woman is brought to the imprisoned Karthik. When she sees Karthik, they both smile at each other, and suddenly, the woman pulls a gun and shoots him. Vijay Prakash stops her act and asks her intention for doing this. She reveals her love story and marriage with Karthik. After her marriage, due to some misunderstanding, Karthik leaves her. After a few months, she reads news about Karthik and the affairs he had with three other women (who claimed Karthik as their husband in the first half of the story). She was shocked with the news and assumed that Karthik is a playboy who had spoiled four women's lives (including hers), so she decides that he is not fit to live.

Karthik escapes from the hospital and with the help of a journalist and goes in search of those girls to know their intention to cause such trouble in his life. There, he finds all the allegations given towards him are false as they have staged a drama against Karthik on the request of Saraswati, an old lady. Sarswati, the woman behind the scene, is the main culprit who saved the girls from getting raped, which was staged by herself as she wanted the help of the girls to trouble Karthik for revenge. Sarswati is shown to be the ex-wife of Karthik's father Krishnamoorthy. Saraswati who kills her father and stages a drama to marry Krishnamoorthy. On their nuptial night, Krishnamurthy realizes that Saraswati has psychotic behavior and the murderer of her father and Krishnamoorthy's fiancée Bhanu's family. He escapes and jumps into a river. Saraswati is sent to an asylum and released after a few years. She sees Krishnamoorthy living a happy life with Bhanu and two children. She kills them on the same day, except for the son, who turned out to be Karthik

In the present, she still hallucinates Karthik for Krishnamoorthy and wants to kill him as revenge for rejecting her. She kidnaps Karthik's wife Priya and threatens him at gunpoint, telling him to kill himself. In an attempt to save Karthik, ACP Vijay Prakash gets injured. The police shoot her in the leg, and she finally shoots herself without letting them know Priya's hideout. Finally, Karthik and the police find Priya at the basement, she apologizes for misunderstanding Karthik, and they reunite.

== Cast ==
Cast (Telugu)	Cast (Tamil)	Role
Havish		Karthik / Krishnamoorthy
Rahman		Vijay Prakash
Regina Cassandra		Saraswathi
Nandita Swetha		Ramya
Anisha Ambrose		Jenny
Tridha Choudhury		Priya
Pujita Ponnada		Bhanu
Aditi Arya		Abhinaya
Vidyullekha Raman		Karthik's coworker
Satya		Journalist
Dhanraj	Parithabangal Gopi	Karthik's coworkers
Venu Yeldandi	Parithabangal Sudhakar	Karthik's coworkers
Sudharshan	Kishore Rajkumar	Karthik's coworkers
Josh Ravi		
Vadlamani Srinivas		Police officer

== Production ==
The film started production as a Telugu film, but the film became bilingual after producer M. S. Sharavanan expressed interest in a Tamil version. Havish requested that the makers rope in another artist for the Tamil version as he was not fluent in the language, but they were keen that Havish do it.

== Music ==
The music is composed by Chaitan Bharadwaj.

Telugu tracklist
No.	Title	Singer(s)	Length
1.	"Sampaddhoy Nanne"	Madhushree
2.	"Idhivarakepudu"	Haricharan, Deepthi Parthasarathy
3.	"Varshinchana"	Haricharan, Alisha Thomas

All lyrics are written by Niranjan Bharathi.

Tamil tracklist
No.	Title	Singer(s)	Length
1.	"En Aasai Macha"	Madhushree	3:41
2.	"En Aasai Macha"	Haricharan, Deepthi Parthasarathy	3:12
3.	"Udhiranae Nee"	Haricharan, Alisha Thomas	3:32
Total length:			10:24

== Home media ==
The film became available as VOD on Netflix in August 2019.

== Reception ==
Thinkal Menon of The Times of India rated the film 2/5 stars and wrote, "The plot looks interesting on paper, and seems to have ample elements for an engaging thriller. But the weak screenplay, numerous logical loopholes and the lack of believability factor make it unappealing." Giving the same rating, Murali Krishna C. H. of Cinema Express wrote, "Seven is a moody investigative thriller with an unenthusiastic narrative and a lot of logical loopholes that undo the promising build-up of the first half."

A critic from TV9 Telugu found the story, cinematography, and a few twists of the film to be positives, while the screenplay and illogical scenes were the negatives. With similar criticisms, the critics of News18 Telugu and Asianet News Telugu rated the film 2/5. A critic from Sakshi wrote that the story is interesting, but the way it's narrated on screen falls flat.

A critic from Dinamalar rated the film 2.25/5, writing that it could've worked if the script had been written better. The critic also criticized Havish for his facial expressions remaining almost the same in all scenes. A critic from Samayam rated the film 2/5, pointing out the dubbing issues in the Tamil version and the film's screenplay being dragged, which they found unusual for a thriller film. The critic praised the performances of Rahman and Regina Cassandra, which they found were the only relief in the film.
