= Nabha Natesh =

Indian actress (born 1995)

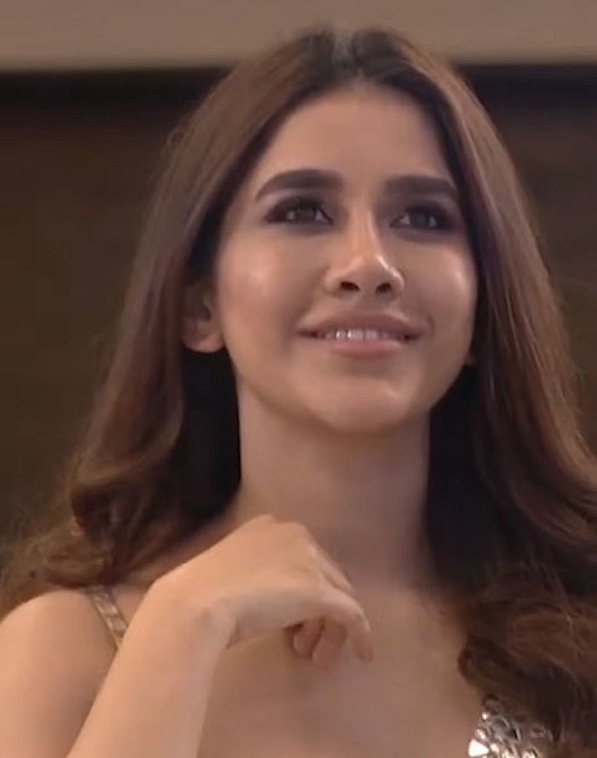
- Nabha in 2021
- Born: 11 December 1989 (age 36)
- Occupations: Actress; Model
- Years active: 2014–present

Nabha Natesh (pronounced [nəbha nət̪ɛʃ]; born 11 December 1989) is an Indian actress and model who primarily appears in Telugu films. She made her debut with Kannada film Vajrakaya (2015) and later in Telugu with Nannu Dochukunduvate (2018). She had her breakthrough with iSmart Shankar in 2019 due to which she is popularly referred as Ismart Beauty in the media.

== Early life and education ==
Nabha went to school in her hometown, Sringeri and she then studied engineering in Information Technology from N.M.A.M. Institute of Technology, Udupi, Karnataka and passed out in 2011. She started modelling along with acting in plays under National Award-winning director Prakash Belawadi. She has trained in Bharatanatyam and choreographed and danced in multiple competitions during her school and college days. She underwent acting training at Abhinaya Taranga and her theatre career was started under Belawadi.

== Career ==
=== Debut and breakthrough (2015–17) ===
Nabha made her lead acting debut at the age of 26, opposite Kannada actor Shiva Rajkumar, in the 2015 film Vajrakaya, which went on to complete over 100-days in multiple theatres in Karnataka. She received widespread praise from both critics and audiences. Deccan Chronicle's writer noted that "Nabha Natesh as Pataka who "fires up" the screen space for a little longer than the others." Times of India's writer states that "Nabha Natesh is impressive as the tapori taking on Shivaraj Kumar" Sify's writer claimed that "Nabha Natesh has done justice to her role" Indiaglitz's writer states that "Nabha Natesh conquers the heart from her dashing role. She is like wind." and she was nominated for Filmfare Award for Best Female Debut –Kannada.

In 2017, she acted in Lee opposite Sumanth Shailendra. In the same year, she featured in a special song in the film, Saheba.

=== Telugu debut and recognition (2018–19) ===
Nabha made her Telugu film debut opposite Sudheer Babu in Nannu Dochukunduvate in 2018. Deccan Chronicle's writer stated, "The film is a perfect launch vehicle for Nabha, who is a livewire and completely steals the show." Times Of India's writer states that "Nabha Natesh unleashes the livewire in her effectively amidst these characters." Indiagltz's writer writes that "Overall, the performance is a treat, complete with a heroine who gets to speak so much, Nabha is chirpy." Telugu360's writer noted that "New heroine Nabha is a good find, she suited Meghana role. Her bubbly characterization, new backdrop as a short film actress bring additional appeal to her role."

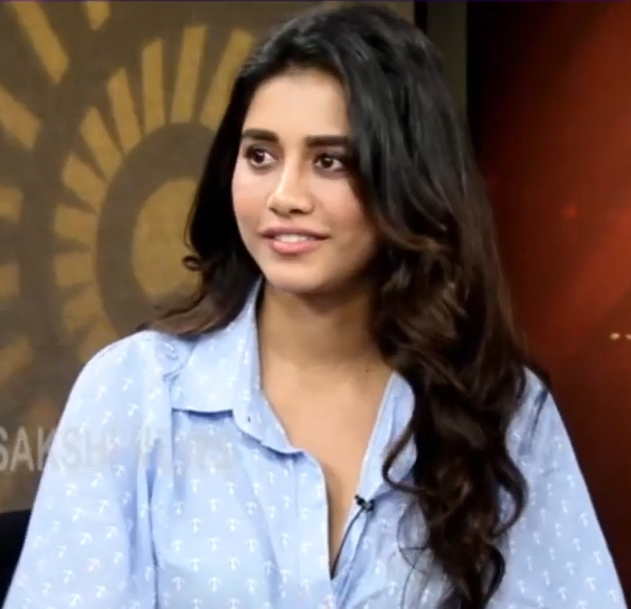
Nabha in 2019 during the promotion of iSmart Shankar film

In 2019, she starred opposite Ram Pothineni in iSmart Shankar, which opened to decent reviews upon release and went on to become a commercial hit at the box office and completed 100 days. Perception about her started to change with the success of the film. Murali Krishna CH of The New Indian Express reported, "She is reckoned as a new-gen actor, who can breathe life into any character she portrays." The speech that Nabha Natesh made during the pre-release of the film received a viral response, reaching 1 million views in less than 24 hours. Neeshita Nyayapati of Times Of India stated "Nabha however delivers an earnest performance with what she's offered." Jeevi of idlebrain.com wrote "Nabha Natesh did a mass character. She oozes glamour and did well." An editor of andhraboxoffice states "Nabha is pretty good and proves to be an able female protagonist."

=== Continued career (2020–present) ===
In 2020, Nabha starred opposite Ravi Teja in Disco Raja. The film opened to mixed reviews and turned out be a box office failure. Later she acted in Solo Brathuke So Better, which opened to decent reviews from audiences and critics upon release, going on to become a commercial hit at the box office. Nabha received applause for her performance as Amrutha. Times of India wrote "Nabha's character Amrutha is being liked by viewers. Her acting is receiving special attention of the fans. The talented actor's career has been soaring ever since she starred in the 2019 sci-fi action drama, iSmartShankar." 123 Telugu stated "Nabha too got a lot of appreciation for her role as Amrutha. Especially, Tej and Nabha looked fresh on the screen and the comedy track between them was well received. She delivered a sensible and entertaining performance and showed her class."

In 2021, Nabha starred in Alludu Adhurs co-starring Bellamkonda Sreenivas and Sonu Sood. Her next film Maestro, was directly released on Hotstar. She starred alongside Nithiin and Tamannaah.

== Personal life ==
Nabha has a brother, Nahush Chakravarthy, who is an up-and-coming actor in Kannada cinema.

== Filmography ==
List of films and roles
Year	Title	Role	Language	Notes	Ref.
2014	Preethi Geethi Ityaadi		Kannada	Cameo appearance	
2015	Vajrakaya	"Pathakha" Parvathi	Kannada		
2017	Lee	Leela	Kannada		
2017	Saheba	Herself	Kannada	Special appearance in the song "Yaare Ninu Roza Huve"	
2018	Nannu Dochukunduvate	Siri / Meghana	Telugu		
2018	Adhugo	Raji	Telugu		
2019	iSmart Shankar	Chandni	Telugu		
2020	Disco Raja	Nabha	Telugu		
2020	Solo Brathuke So Better	Amrutha	Telugu		
2021	Alludu Adhurs	Koumudi Reddy	Telugu		
2021	Maestro	Sophie	Telugu		
2024	Darling	Priya Rao	Telugu		
2026	Nagabandham: The Secret Treasure	Parvathi and Revathi	Telugu		
TBA	Swayambhu †	TBA	Telugu	Post-production	

== Awards and nominations ==
Year	Award	Category	Work	Result	Ref.
2016	63rd Filmfare Awards South	Filmfare Award for Best Actress – Kannada	Vajrakaya	Nominated	
2019	8th South Indian International Movie Awards	Best Female Debut – Telugu	Nannu Dochukunduvate	Nominated	
2021	9th South Indian International Movie Awards	Best Actress – Telugu	Solo Brathuke So Better	Nominated	
