= Abrar Zahoor =

Indian actor and model

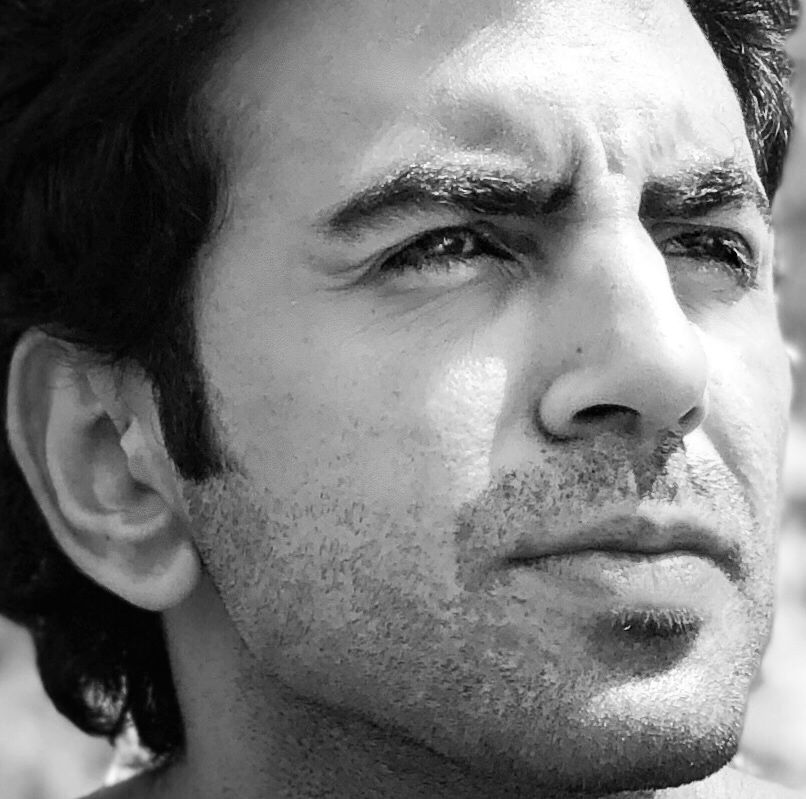
- Abrar Zahoor
- Born: Abrar Zahoor Dhar; Srinagar, Jammu and Kashmir, India
- Education: Madras Christian College
- Occupations: Actor, model
- Years active: 2016–present

Abrar Zahoor is an Indian Actor and entrepreneur from Srinagar, Jammu and Kashmir. He made his Hindi film debut in the 2016 biographical thriller Neerja, portraying Zayd Safrini, the lead hijacker and principal antagonist in the film. Neerja received the National Film Award for Best Hindi Film at the 64th National Film Awards in 2017.

He subsequently portrayed Idris, the main antagonist, in the 2019 action film Uri: The Surgical Strike, which received the National Film Award for Best Popular Film Providing Wholesome Entertainment.

== Early life and career ==
Abrar was born and raised in Srinagar, Jammu and Kashmir. He attended Woodland House School in Srinagar before moving to Chennai to complete his higher secondary education at Madras Christian School. He subsequently pursued a degree in Visual Communication at Madras Christian College from 2007 to 2010.

During his time in Chennai, Abrar developed an interest in modelling and participated in fashion shows. He also pursued training in 3D animation and filmmaking at the Maya Academy of Advanced Cinematics (MAAC). In 2011, he moved to Bengaluru, where he continued working in modelling and exploring opportunities in the entertainment industry.

In 2015, Abrar moved to Mumbai to pursue a career in Hindi cinema. During the same year, he received acting training at Barry John Acting School. In 2016, he made his Hindi film debut in Neerja, portraying Zayd Safrini, one of the hijackers involved in the hijacking of Pan Am Flight 73.

== Filmography ==
=== Films ===
Year	Title	Role	Director
2016	Neerja	Zayd Safrini	Ram Madhvani
2019	Uri: The Surgical Strike	Idris	Aditya Dhar
2019	Commando 3	Taabish	Aditya Datt
2019	Mission Mangal	Ekta's boyfriend	Jagan Shakti
2023	Chatrapathi		V. V. Vinayak
2023	Gadar 2	Anwar Ali (ISI officer)	Anil Sharma
2027	Penthouse	Sandy (Sandeep Marva)	Abbas–Mustan
2027	3 Monkeys	ACP Pranjal Dhar	Abbas–Mustan

=== Web series ===
Year	Title	Role	Writer	Platform	Director
2019	Will Ashtley Return?	Astley	Samimitra Das	ZEE5	Samimitra Das
2020	The Middle Elevator	Rohan		MX Player	Krishna Bhatt

== Awards and nominations ==
Year	Award	Category	Film	Result
2016	BIG Star Entertainment Awards	Most Entertaining Debut Actor	Neerja	Nominated
