= Dhira (film) =

- Release poster
- Directed by: Arun Kumar Rapolu
- Screenplay by: Arun Kumar Rapolu
- Starring: Bellamkonda Sreenivas
- Music by: Sri Murali Karthikeya
- Production company: A Theorem Studios
- Distributed by: Amazon Prime Video
- Release date: 10 November 2020
- Running time: 117 minutes
- Country: India
- Language: Telugu

Dhira is a 2020 Indian Telugu-language animated biographical film written and directed by Arun Kumar Rapolu. The film is based on the life of Tenali Rama, which was voice by Bellamkonda Sreenivas. The film was dubbed in 11 languages.

== Voice cast ==
- Bellamkonda Sreenivas as Tenali Rama
- Hemachandra

=== Dubbed versions ===
Actor	Language	Role	Ref.	Actor	Language	Role	Ref.
Jeet	Bengali	Tenali Rama		Pratik Gandhi	Gujarati		
Vivek Oberoi	Hindi	Tenali Rama		Askar Ali	Malayalam	Tenali Rama	
Vijay Sethupathi	Tamil	Tenali Rama		Sri Nagesh	Bhojpuri	Tenali Rama	
Dhruva Sarja	Kannada	Tenali Rama		Sabyasachi Mishra	Odia	Tenali Rama	
Swapnil Joshi	Marathi	Tenali Rama		Aashish Bandari	English	Tenali Rama	
Yuvraj Hans	Punjabi	Tenali Rama		Aashish Bandari	English	Tenali Rama	

== Production ==
The film took three years to complete and was made with a team of 75 people from the Hyderabad-based startup A Theorem Studios using Blender.

== Accolades ==
Date	Event	Category	Recipient	Result	Ref.
17 July 2021	2nd ANN Awards	Best Director of an Animated Film	Dhira	Won	
17 July 2021	2nd ANN Awards	Best Technical Innovation	Dhira	Won	
