= Nannu Dochukunduvate =

- Release poster
- Directed by: R. S. Naidu
- Produced by: Sudheer Babu
- Starring: Sudheer Babu; Nabha Natesh; Nassar
- Cinematography: Suresh Ragutu
- Edited by: Chota K. Naidu
- Music by: B. Ajaneesh Loknath
- Production company: Sudheer Babu Productions
- Release date: 20 September 2018
- Running time: 142 minutes
- Country: India
- Language: Telugu

Nannu Dochukunduvate (transl. The One Who Robs Me) is a 2018 Indian Telugu-language romance film directed by R. S. Naidu and starring Sudheer Babu and Nabha Natesh. The film is Nabha's debut. The music was composed by B. Ajaneesh Loknath. It's dubbed in Hindi as Pyaar Ki Jeet. The film's title is based on a song from Gulebakavali Katha (1962).

== Synopsis ==
Karthik (Sudheer Babu) is a workaholic working in a software company. He dreams of immigrating to the US. A situation forces him to hire a short film actress Meghana/Siri (Nabha Natesh) to act as his lover, Meghana is playful and full of life, unlike Karthik who leads a boring life. After a few incidents Meghana proposes to Karthik through WhatsApp that he does not notice due to his work pressure and she deletes the message. Suddenly Karthik's father gets sick and he asks Meghana and Karithik to attend a wedding in which accidentally they got close and Karthik starts to love her. After the wedding he wants to propose, but he heard Meghana promising to her mother that she will marry whoever her mother will choose in her favorite temple. Karithik feels sad and leaves. To their surprise Karithik 's father knew that they were not a real couple and her name. They were both separated. On Meghana 's wedding day Karithik hurries to her wedding, but they learn that it was only an act. The actor leaves the act and Karithik replaces him as the movie ends.

== Cast ==
- Sudheer Babu as Karthik
- Nabha Natesh as Meghana / Siri, software engineer
- Nassar as Karthik's father
- Rajsekhar Aningi
- Viva Harsha as Harsha
- Chalapathi Rao
- Jeeva as College Principal
- Babloo Prithiveeraj as David
- Varshini Sounderajan as Sathya
- Sudharshan as Karthik’s friend
- Prabhas Sreenu as Daivatailam, hotel manager
- Venu Yeldandi as Giri
- Tulasi as Meghana's mother
- Tarzan as Baasha Bhai
- Ravi Varma Adduri
- Rajasree Nair
- Surya Srinivas as Karthik’s brother
- Shanmukh Jaswanth Kandregula as Rohan
- Ravi Siva Teja

== Soundtrack ==
The Music was composed by B. Ajaneesh Loknath and Released by Sony Music India.

Nannu Dochukunduvate

Soundtrack album by B. Ajaneesh Loknath
- Released: 15 September 2018
- Recorded: 2018
- Genre: Soundtrack
- Length: 17:48
- Label: Sony Music India
- Producer: B. Ajaneesh Loknath

B. Ajaneesh Loknath chronology
Vaasu Naan Pakka Commercial (2018)	Nannu Dochukunduvate (2018)	Sarkari Hi. Pra. Shaale, Kasaragodu, Koduge: Ramanna Rai (2018)

Track list
No.	Title	Lyrics	Singer(s)	Length
1.	"Big Boss Anthem"	Krishnaaji	Harshika Devanathan, Tippu, Arunraja Kamaraj	3:24
2.	"Nijamga Kothaga"	Bhaskarabhatla Ravi Kumar	Harshika Devanathan	3:04
3.	"Inthe Inthena"	Sri Mani	Naresh Iyer	3:33
4.	"Mounam Maatathoti"	Sri Mani	B. Ajaneesh Loknath	4:21
5.	"Okadhaari Lona"	Ramanjaneyulu	Haricharan, C.R. Bobby	3:26
Total length:				17:48

== Reception ==
Times of India rated the film as "a passable laugh-a-minute riot" with good performances from the lead pair, while The Hindu wrote that, "the writer-director translates the script into a film, reasonably fun outing".
