= Alludu Adhurs =

- Theatrical release poster
- Directed by: Santosh Srinivas
- Written by: Santosh Srinivas
- Produced by: Gorrela Subrahmanyam
- Starring: Bellamkonda Sreenivas; Nabha Natesh; Anu Emmanuel; Sonu Sood; Prakash Raj
- Cinematography: Chota K. Naidu
- Edited by: Tammiraju
- Music by: Devi Sri Prasad
- Production company: Sumanth Movie Productions
- Release date: 15 January 2021
- Running time: 149 minutes
- Country: India
- Language: Telugu

Alludu Adhurs (transl. Marvelous son-in-law) is a 2021 Indian Telugu-language action comedy film written and directed by Santosh Srinivas and produced by Gorrela Subrahmanyam. The film stars Bellamkonda Sreenivas, Nabha Natesh, Anu Emmanuel, Sonu Sood and Prakash Raj. The film was released on 15 January 2021 coinciding with Sankranthi. The film received negative reviews from critics and audiences and became a box office flop.

== Plot ==
Sreenu meets Vasu at school and falls in love with her. They become close friends and later she leaves. After which he and his friends vow to never fall for girls.

20 years later he meets Vasu at a business meeting, later he learns she is in love with Gaja, her father's enemy, who wants to avenge his father and sister's death with his uncle Brahmaji.Before that Sreenu falls in love with Koumadi.While helping his friend from Koumadi's father as he proposed Koumadi and learns she is sister of Vasu

It is later revealed that Vasu tried to commit suicide but was saved by some villagers and then taken home. Even though she learns that Gaja was only using her for his revenge, she believes that he loves her, so Seenu acts as if he was possessed by Vasu's ghost, as everyone believes she is dead. After a series of incidents, Gaja and Vasu, along with Seenu and Koumudi get married.

== Cast ==
- Bellamkonda Sreenivas as Sai Sreenivas "Sreenu"
- Nabha Natesh as Koumudi Reddy
- Anu Emmanuel as Vasundhara "Vasu" Reddy
- Sonu Sood as Gaja
- Prakash Raj as Jaypal Reddy "Patela", Vasundhara and Koumudi's father
- Vennela Kishore as Pandu, Sreenu's friend
- Jaya Prakash Reddy as DCP
- Vidyullekha Raman as Koumudi's friend
- Anish Kuruvilla as Sreenu's father
- Indraja as Sreenu's mother
- Hari Teja as Rattalu, Sreenu's house-maid
- Satya as Bandar Pichai, Koumudi's fiancé
- Srinivasa Reddy as Jaypal Reddy's henchman
- Mamilla Shailaja Priya as Gaja's sister
- Brahmaji as Brahmaji, Gaja's uncle
- Chammak Chandra as Gaja's henchman
- Harsha Vardhan as Psychiatrist
- Saptagiri as astrologer Kadra
- Sivannarayana Naripeddi as Pandu's father
- Satya Krishnan as Pandu's sister
- Sameer Hasan as SI
- Duvvasi Mohan as Servant
- Mahesh Vitta as Sreenu's friend
- Getup Seenu as Sreenu's friend
- Mirchi Hemanth as Sreenu's friend
- Sudharshan as DCP's assistant
- Appaji Ambarisha Darbha as Gaja's father
- Rocket Raghava as Kadra's disciple
- Kadambari Kiran as Marriage Broker
- Venugopal Kosuri as Jaypal Reddy's henchmen
- Monal Gajjar as herself (special appearance in item song "Ramba Oorvasi Menaka")
- Sudhakar Mishra as Company official

== Production ==
Principal photography of the film began in January 2020. Later in March 2020, a promotional poster was released announcing the film's release on 30 April 2020. But due to the COVID-19 lockdown in India, the filming was paused. The filming was then resumed in September 2020. In December 2020, the film was announced to be releasing on 14 January 2021.

== Soundtrack ==
Alludu Adhurs

Soundtrack album by Devi Sri Prasad
- Released: 12 January 2021 (Jukebox)
- Recorded: 2020
- Genre: Feature film soundtrack
- Length: 20:14
- Language: Telugu
- Label: Aditya Music
- Producer: Devi Sri Prasad

Devi Sri Prasad chronology
Sarileru Neekevvaru (2020)	Alludu Adhurs (2021)	Uppena (2021)
External audio
- Audio Jukebox on YouTube

Singles from Krack
- 1. "Hola Chica" Released: 3 January 2021; 2. "Padipoya" Released: 8 January 2021; 3. "Alludu Adhurs" Released: 9 January 2021; 4. "Nadhila Nadhila" Released: 11 January 2021; 5. "Ramba Oorvasi" Released: 12 January 2021

No.	Title	Lyrics	Singer(s)	Length
1.	"Hola Chica"	Sri Mani	Jaspreet Jasz, Ranina Reddy (Dialogue)	4:05
2.	"Nadhila Nadhila"	Sri Mani	Sagar, Haripriya	4:09
3.	"Alludu Adhurs"	Ramajogayya Sastry	Jaspreet Jasz, Sri Krishna, Vaishnavi	4:04
4.	"Padipoyya"	Bhaskar Batla	Javed Ali	3:58
5.	"Ramba Oorvasi Menaka"	Sri Mani	Mangli, Hemachandra	3:58
Total length:				20:14

== Release ==
The film was released on 15 January 2021 coinciding with Sankranthi, alongside other Telugu films including Krack and Red.

== Reception ==
In his review for Firstpost, Hemanth Kumar rated the film 1 of 5 and termed it, "silly, outdated, and a nonsensical film." The Hindu critic Sangeetha Devi wrote: "The writer has weaved multiple sub-plots to fill the two-and-a-half-hour slot. The story appears tailor-made for the front-benchers and one feels a sense of deja vu at the comedy." The Times of India, which rated 2.5 stars out of five, stated: "A film with too many elements and very little substance, Alludu Adhurs is let down by its predictability"

The film was later dubbed and released in Tamil as Maanbumigu Marumagan.
