= Bellamkonda Suresh =

Indian film producer

- Born: 5 December 1965 (age 60)
- Occupation: Indian Film Producer
- Years active: 2000–present
- Spouse: Bellamkonda Padmavathi
- Children: Bellamkonda Sai Sreenivas; Bellamkonda Ganesh Babu

Bellamkonda Suresh is an Indian film producer in the Telugu film industry.

== Biography ==
Bellamkonda Suresh is married to Bellamkonda Padmavathi and has two sons named Bellamkonda Sai Sreenivas and Bellamkonda Ganesh Babu. Sreenivas made his debut with Alludu Seenu in 2014.

== Filmography ==
Key
†	Denotes films that have not yet been released

Year	Title	Director	Notes
1999	Sambayya	K. S. Nageswara Rao	
2000	Maa Annayya	Ravi Raja Pinisetty	
2002	Aadi	V. V. Vinayak	
2002	Chennakesava Reddy	V. V. Vinayak	
2004	Lakshmi Narasimha	Jayanth C. Paranjee	Remake of Saamy
2004	Naa Autograph	S. Gopal Reddy	Remake of Autograph
2008	Bhale Dongalu	K. Vijaya Bhaskar	Remake of Bunty aur Babli; Presenter only
2009	Ride	Ramesh Varma	
2010	Sambho Siva Sambho	Samuthirakani	Remake of Naadodigal
2010	Golimaar	Puri Jagannadh	
2010	Nagavalli	P. Vasu	Remake of Aptharakshaka
2011	Kandireega	Santosh Srinivas	
2011	Kanchana	Raghava Lawrence	Telugu dubbed version(Distribution rights)
2012	Bodyguard	Gopichand Malineni	Remake of Body Guard
2012	Bus Stop	Maruthi Dasari	
2013	Jabardasth	B. V. Nandini Reddy	Adaptation of Band Baaja Baaraat
2013	Tadakha	Kishore Kumar Pardasani	Remake of Vettai
2014	Alludu Seenu	V. V. Vinayak	
2014	Rabhasa	Santosh Srinivas	

== Controversy ==
Tollywood actor Nandamuri Balakrishna was involved in a shooting incident that took place on 3 June 2004 around 20:50 hrs IST at his residence in Jubilee Hills, Hyderabad. The actor had fired shots at the producer Bellamkonda Suresh and his associate Satyanarayana Chowdhary. Later both the wounded were admitted to Apollo hospital. The circumstances under which the case was handled led to much controversy as purported by the Human Rights Forum (HRF). The HRF questioned the authenticity of people who handled the case, and the circumstances under which the actor was shielded from police by being given refuge in the CARE Hospital without a justifiable cause.
