= Solo Brathuke So Better =

2020 Telugu film directed by Subbu

- Theatrical release poster
- Directed by: Subbu Mangadevi
- Written by: Subbu Mangadevi
- Produced by: B. V. S. N. Prasad
- Starring: Sai Tej; Nabha Natesh
- Cinematography: Venkat Dilip Chunduru
- Edited by: Naveen Nooli
- Music by: S. Thaman
- Production company: Sri Venkateswara Cine Chitra
- Distributed by: Zee Studios
- Release date: 25 December 2020
- Country: India
- Language: Telugu
- Budget: ₹10 crore

Solo Brathuke So Better (transl. Solo life is so better) is a 2020 Indian Telugu-language romantic comedy film directed by debutant Subbu and produced by B. V. S. N. Prasad. The film stars Sai Tej and Nabha Natesh.

Principal photography of the film began in November 2019 with the filming taking place primarily at Visakhapatnam. Initially scheduled to release on 1 May 2020, it was postponed due to COVID-19 pandemic. The film released theatrically on 25 December 2020 and opened to mixed reviews from the critics.

== Plot ==
The film starts with a student riot stating they want justice for an unnamed act. The film then flashes back to 2012, where Virat is lecturing the students in his college to not fall in love and stay a bachelor. He encourages them to read his book, Solo Brathuke So Better, which has 108 principles to live a single life as a bachelor/spinster. He is supported in this venture by his friends and uncle, who is married and cannot handle his wife's nagging, and he becomes the leader and founder of the SBSB union. During the college farewell, Virat's classmate Rashi proposes to him, but he rejects her, leaving her in tears.

Virat goes to Hyderabad to take up a job in an event management company and, along with his friends, finds an apartment to stay. Govind Gowda comes over to invite his friends to his wedding, and Virat refuses to come. However, he becomes the event manager for Govind's wedding, which gets cancelLed due to Virat's antics and because Govind lied about his age. As time passes, each of Virat's friends gets married, and he gets frustrated. One night, he sees his role model (who the SBSB union was inspired by) giving an interview on TV urging guys to get married. After seeing his foundation shaken, Virat returns to his house, where he finds out that his aunt had died months ago and finds his uncle regretting the constant fights they had. Influenced by both incidents, Virat aspires to get married and calls his friends over. They try to find a suitable girl, but no one from their college is ready to marry him since Virat was the 'villain' in their love stories; the only one willing to marry him is his boss, but he isn't ready to, as she's comparatively older than him.

Govind returns again, inviting Virat to his next wedding, to which he agrees when he pesters Virat to come. However, that wedding gets stopped as well, and the bride, Amrutha, states publicly that she is in love with Virat. Virat becomes jubilant and decides to marry her as well. However, on talking with her, Amrutha tells Virat that she is a staunch believer in Virat's policies and that staying a bachelor is best. Virat realizes that what he was doing was wrong and decides to change her mind. These involve a fight with Ravanudu, taking her to a Titanic painting exhibition, but she defeats these attempts using Virat's SBSB policies. Virat's uncle commits suicide, unable to handle the loneliness and finding no way out. Virat decides to confess his love for Amrutha, but Ravanudu takes her hostage to avenge his prior humiliation. Virat defeats the henchmen and is about to confess to Amrutha, but she says that her father has spoken to her and changed her mind. Virat is ecstatic and confesses everything to Amrutha. This leads to a riot by the SBSB followers, in which Virat appeases the crowd by stating that he will write 108 principles to convince them to fall in love, and the film ends with Virat and Amrutha getting married.

== Cast ==
- Sai Dharam Tej as Virat
- Nabha Natesh as Amrutha
- Nazia Davison as Rashi Singh
- Rajendra Prasad as Venkataramana, Amrutha's father
- Naresh as Virat's father
- Rao Ramesh as Virat’s uncle
- Kalyani Natarajan as Virat's mother
- Vennela Kishore as Govind Gowda
- Ajay as Ravanudu
- Satya as Murali, Virat's friend
- Sudharshan as Virat's friend
- Hyper Aadi as painter and Virat's friend
- Kalpa Latha as Virat's aunt
- R. Narayana Murthy as Murthy

== Production ==
Sri Venkateswara Cine Chitra announced a movie with Sai Tej and shooting commenced during Tej's previous movie Prati Roju Pandage, and the film was formally launched on 7 October 2019, by commencing a puja ceremony attended by film team.

=== Filming ===
Principal photography began on International Men's Day 19 November 2019. A shoot was scheduled in Kailasagiri, Visakhapatnam for more than 20-days. A shoot was also scheduled for 15 days at Andhra University and GITAM Visakhapatnam. The film was reportedly made on a budget of ₹20 crore.

== Soundtrack ==
Solo Brathuke So Better

Soundtrack album by S. Thaman
- Released: 2020
- Genre: Feature film soundtrack
- Length: 13:51
- Label: Sony Music India
- Producer: S. Thaman

S. Thaman chronology
Miss India (2020)	Solo Brathuke So Better (2020)	Krack (2021)

Singles from Solo Brathuke So Better
- 1. "No Pelli" Released: 25 May 2020; 2. "Hey Idi Nenena" Released: 25 August 2020; 3. "Amrutha" Released: 15 October 2020; 4. "Solo Brathuke So Better" Released: 11 December 2020

The music for this film is composed by S. Thaman. The first single, "No Pelli" written by Raghuram and sung by Armaan Malik and was released on 25 May 2020. Varun Tej and Rana Daggubati were both featured in the promotional video song of "No Pelli". The second single "Hey Idi Nenena" was sung by Sid Sriram and was released on 25 August 2020. The third single "Amrutha" was sung by Nakash Aziz and was released on 15 October 2020. The last single "Solo Brathuke So Better" was sung by Vishal Dadlani and was released on 11 December 2020.

Track list
No.	Title	Lyrics	Singer(s)	Length
1.	"No Pelli"	Raghuram	Armaan Malik	3:08
2.	"Hey Idi Nenena"	Raghuram	Sid Sriram	4:15
3.	"Amrutha"	Kasarla Shyam	Nakash Aziz	3:28
4.	"Solo Brathuke So Better"	Sirivennela Seetharama Sastry	Vishal Dadlani	3:00
Total length:				13:51

== Release ==
Solo Brathuke So Better was initially scheduled to release on 1 May 2020, but was postponed due to the COVID-19 pandemic.

== Reception ==
=== Critical reception ===
The film received mixed reviews from critics. The Times of India critic Neeshita Nyaypati rated the film 3 stars out of 5 and stated: "Solo Brathuke So Better had the potential to be a film that’s fresh and even funny, despite the predictability, because the concept at the core of it all might not be new but is solid." Nyayapati criticized the film's reliance on "fat-shaming" and "ageism" to generate humour. Firstpost's Hemant Kumar wrote: "Solo Brathuke So Better chugs along to make its point about the need for a companion, but the journey is bland," rating the film 2.5/5.

Y. Sunita Chowdhary of The Hindu opined that the film could have benefited from a better script. "The dialogues are good, the screenplay is convincing but there is not enough content or high point in the story. The conflict is not strong and there is hardly anything exciting to look forward to," Chowdhary wrote. Vishwanath writing for The New Indian Express criticized the film by stating, "A scintillating achievement of Solo Brathuke So Better is that it is so bizarre that it makes us miss cliche-ridden films with so much ease. It plays out a semi-joke of an idea believing that it will touch the hearts of the audience. That’s its spectacular tragedy."

Karthik Keramulu of Film Companion opined that the romcom follows a tried and tested formula. "If Virat’s chemistry with Amrutha had been as good as the one he shared with Govinda Gowda, this film would have landed safely," Keremulu added while explaining that the film did not convey why Virat wants to marry her. Jeevi from Idlebrain.com rated the film 3 out of 5 stars, stating, "First half is entertaining. Second half is emotional. Plus points are casting, engaging narration and less runtime (2 hours and 6 minutes). On the flipside, the second half travels in a predictable manner."

=== Box office ===
In Andhra Pradesh and Telangana, the film was screened with a cap of 50% on occupancy owing to the COVID-19 pandemic restrictions. The film netted over ₹2 crore on its opening day, with an estimated gross of ₹3–4 crore. In three days, the film grossed ₹10.8 crore in the domestic market and ₹12.4 crore worldwide.

In the international market, the film grossed $67,000 at the U.S. box office, and $58,739 in Australia on its opening weekend.

== Accolades ==
Award (Note: Awards, festivals and organizations are in alphabetical order.)	Date of ceremony (Note: Date is linked to the article about the awards held that year, wherever possible.)	Category	Recipient(s)	Result	Ref.
South Indian International Movie Awards	11–12 September 2021	Best Film – Telugu	Sri Venkateswara Cine Chitra	Nominated	
South Indian International Movie Awards	11–12 September 2021	Best Debut Director – Telugu	Subbu	Nominated	
South Indian International Movie Awards	11–12 September 2021	Best Actress – Telugu	Nabha Natesh	Nominated	
South Indian International Movie Awards	11–12 September 2021	Best Supporting Actor – Telugu	Rao Ramesh	Nominated	
South Indian International Movie Awards	11–12 September 2021	Best Comedian – Telugu	Satya	Nominated	
South Indian International Movie Awards	11–12 September 2021	Best Cinematographer – Telugu	Venkat C. Dilip	Nominated	
