= Alludu Seenu =

2014 film by V. V. Vinayak

- Promotional poster
- Directed by: V. V. Vinayak
- Written by: Kona Venkat (dialogue)
- Screenplay by: V. V. Vinayak
- Story by: K. S. Ravindra
- Produced by: Bellamkonda Suresh; Bellamkonda Ganesh Babu
- Starring: Bellamkonda Sreenivas; Samantha Ruth Prabhu; Prakash Raj; Pradeep Rawat; Brahmanandam
- Cinematography: Chota K. Naidu
- Edited by: Gautham Raju
- Music by: Devi Sri Prasad
- Production company: Sri Lakshmi Narasimha Productions
- Release date: 25 July 2014
- Running time: 144 minutes
- Country: India
- Language: Telugu
- Budget: ₹40 crore

Alludu Seenu (transl. Son-in-law Seenu) is a 2014 Indian Telugu-language action comedy film directed by V. V. Vinayak. Produced by Bellamkonda Suresh on his banner Sri Lakshmi Narasimha Productions, the film marks the debut of his son Bellamkonda Sreenivas as the titular character, with Samantha Ruth Prabhu, Prakash Raj, Pradeep Rawat, and Brahmanandam in lead roles, while Tamannaah makes a special appearance. Devi Sri Prasad composed the music for this film while Chota K. Naidu and Gautham Raju handled the cinematography and editing of the film, respectively.

The film was officially launched on 15 February 2013 in Hyderabad. After altering the bound script twice, the film's principal photography commenced at Annapoorna Studios in Hyderabad in October 2013. Majority of the film was shot in and around Hyderabad while significant portions were shot at Alleppey in Kerala. The songs were shot in the locales of Japan, Dubai and Italy apart from the sets built in Hyderabad. After completion of a few action sequences at Gachibowli Aluminium Factory in Hyderabad, the film's principal photography came to an end on 14 June 2014.

The film was released worldwide on 25 July 2014. Upon release, the film received mixed to positive reviews from critics calling it a commercial entertainer and praising the principal cast's performances, although they were unsupportive of the film's predictable narrative and placement of the song numbers. While the distributors recovered most if not all of their respective distribution costs with the film collecting a distributor's share of ₹24.55 crore at the box office, the film was a cost failure for its producers due to its expensive budget of ₹40 crore which made it the most expensive film for a debutante and one of the most expensive Telugu films at the time of release. Regardless, Alludu Seenu was the second highest grossing Telugu film for a debutante behind Chirutha at the time of its release. Later the film was dubbed in Hindi as Mard Ka Badla (2019). Sai Srinivas won Filmfare Award for Best Male Debut – South. Later the film was dubbed into Malayalam as Aliyan Sreeni and Tamil as Mappilai Seenu. It also won the state Gaddar Award for Third Best Feature Film.

== Plot ==
Seenu, better known as Alludu Seenu, lives with his uncle Narasimha in a village where both are in great debt. One day, they run away to Chennai, hoping to fly to Dubai, earn a lot of money, and clear their debts. They mistake their train and they end up in Hyderabad. They land in a lodge where Seenu discovers that he is in Hyderabad, but to his horror, the city's don Bhai resembles his uncle Narasimha very much. He uses his uncle's face to earn a lot of money, and by fooling Dimple, Bhai's right hand. He also makes Bhai's stepdaughter Anjali fall in love with him, when she mistakes him to be her fiancé, Rohit. When Bhai realizes that someone is faking him in the city, he plans to get him killed but ends up discovering that the faker is none other than his identical-twin brother Narasimha.

Bhai catches Seenu and Narasimha and their fellows, and orders his men to kill them. Seenu manages to escape with them. Narasimha now tells Seenu that he was the chief of his village and the identical-twin brother of Bhai. Years ago, when Narasimha had collected some projection funds from villagers and was going to submit it to a superior, Bhai attacked his car, which he and his wife Nandini and daughter Anjali were all in. Anjali survived the attack and was later adopted by Bhai, who wanted only the heritage of her father. Bhai told everyone that Narasimha killed his own family and escaped with the money, making all people hate him, including Anjali.

Narasimha is shocked to learn that his blood daughter Anjali is still alive. Meanwhile, Anjali learns Seenu is not his fiancé Rohit but is only pretending to be, so she starts to hate him and leaves with Bhai for Sharjah to marry the real Rohit, the son of Bhanu, a don in Sharjah. Seenu and Narasimha also arrive in Sharjah to stop the wedding.

In Sharjah, Seenu somehow kidnaps Bhai, keeps him captive, and makes Narasimha disguise as him to fool others to execute his plan to call off the wedding, unite Seenu and Anjali, and reveal the truth to her. With some plans, they swindle some money from Bhanu, and tell Anjali the real story of her father Narasimha, and stepfather Bhai, making her fall in love with Seenu again. After that, they escape from Sharjah and fly to India, while Bhai also escapes from captivity and tells Bhanu they've all been cheated.

Bhanu and Bhai all fly to India to kill them, but all their men are defeated by Seenu with him managing to kill Rohit, Bhanu's son. Seenu, not only brings them to justice as Bhai and Bhanu are taken to jail, but also clears his uncle's accused crimes. The village apologizes to Narasimha and welcomes him again.

== Cast ==
- Bellamkonda Sreenivas as Alludu Seenu
- Samantha Ruth Prabhu as Anjali (Voice dubbed by Chinmayi)
- Prakash Raj as Narasimha and Bhai (dual role)
- Pradeep Rawat as Bhanu Bhai
- Bramhanandam as Dimple
- Tanikella Bharani as Narasimha's friend
- Raghu Babu as Nayudu / Lungi Baba
- Ravi Babu as Peda Prasad
- Vennela Kishore as Lungi Baba's friend
- Praveen as Lungi Baba's friend
- Venu Yeldandi as Lungi Baba's friend
- Ananth Babu as Auto Driver
- Master Bharath
- Gundu Sudarshan
- Prudhviraj

Cameo appearance

- Tamannaah Bhatia in the song "Labbar Bomma"

== Production ==
=== Development ===
On 5 December 2008 as Bellamkonda Suresh celebrated his birthday at the Devnar School for the Blind in Begumpet at Hyderabad, V. V. Vinayak who came as a guest to the function revealed the first news of Sai Sreenivas' film debut. He said "I share an emotional bonding with Bellamkonda Suresh for a long time as he gave me the first break as a director. It was Bellamkonda Suresh who introduced me as a director. Now I want to direct Bellamkonda Suresh’s son Sai’s debut film. I wish to make Sai a nice hero." Bellamkonda Suresh spoke "I would like to thank VV Vinayak for offering to introducing my son as a hero. My son Sai will be introduced as hero in 2011. I will send him to USA to learn more about acting. I am indebted to VV Vinayak for the favor he is doing to me." On 15 February 2013 the film was officially launched at Annapurna Studios in Hyderabad and along with the film's crew, celebrities like Venkatesh and Dasari Narayana Rao attended the event. On that day, Devi Sri Prasad was announced as the music director while Chota K. Naidu and Gautham Raju were selected as the cinematographer and editor of the film respectively. In mid-May 2014, reports emerged that the makers were considering to title the film as Alludu Sreenu. The same was officially confirmed by Samantha in her Twitter on 26 May 2014.

=== Casting ===
In early February 2013, Samantha Ruth Prabhu was selected to play the heroine in this film as a part of the three-film deal she entered with Bellamkonda Suresh. She stated that she accepted to be a part of the film only due to her good relationship with Bellamkonda Suresh when he helped her during the time when she was suffering with serious skin ailments. She said "Bellamkonda Suresh has stood by me during the toughest phase in my life and I am doing this film for him." A photo shoot was conducted later on Samantha and Sai Sreenivas in the same month. In mid-March 2013, it was reported that Tamannaah Bhatia was selected as the other heroine of the film and it was said that Bellamkonda Suresh offered her a huge remuneration for the film. She too confirmed the news that she is sharing the screen along with a debutante hero. But since the previous two scripts were not accepted by Vinayak himself and after penning a fresh script, Tamannaah was no more a part of the film as the new one required a single heroine only. In the end of January 2014, Prakash Raj reacted in his Twitter about the speculations that he would play a double role in Mahesh Babu's Aagadu that he is not playing a dual role in that film but he is playing a dual role in this film which he called an "interesting" one. In the end of March 2014, it was reported that Tamannaah would do a special song in the film.

It was said that she would participate in the shoot for this song in the end of April 2014 or early May 2014. It was also said that the song would be the introduction song of the hero in the film. But by the time the reports emerged into the media, Tamannaah wrapped up the shoot of the song in the film on 31 March and V. V. Vinayak thanked her for accepting the offer in his Facebook page. The song, a romantic one, was shot in Hyderabad in a vineyard set for five days. In an interaction to Chennai Times, Tamannaah's father said "The primary reason why she agreed to do this song was because it is the most important song in the film. It is not an item song but a romantic number and the director narrated how he intends to shoot it. It is true that a year ago, when the script was first written, Tamannaah had chosen to be a part of this film. However, when the script was changed, we mutually agreed to part ways. But despite that, both Tamannaah and Vinayak have mutual respect for each other and that is why, when Vinayak requested Tamannaah to do this one song for him, she agreed."

=== Filming ===
The film's first schedule of shooting started at Annapurna Studios in Hyderabad in the end of October 2013 due to delay in script work and a song on Samantha and Bellamkonda Sreenivas was shot there. After completing the first schedule silently, the film unit proceeded to Japan to shoot a song on Sai Sreenivas and Samantha in the exotic locales of that country. The regular shooting continued for some time after the unit's return from Japan and after a brief gap, the shooting continued from 19 February 2014 at Ramanaidu Studios in Hyderabad where some street scenes were shot on Sai Sreenivas and Samantha. Later again after a brief gap due to Samantha's busy schedules, the filming continued at Fort Grand in Hyderabad which was known for its picturesque setting. Later it was reported that the film's shoot would continue in Dubai after a song was filmed on the leads in Hyderabad. After completion of the Hyderabad schedule of Kaththi, Samantha joined the sets of the film on 1 April 2014. She left the sets after completing her part in the schedule and joined the sets of Kaththi again and took a break from there in the first week of May. Later she joined the sets of this film at Alleppey in Kerala. After returning from there, Samantha tweeted in the second week of May that the team would go to Italy for filming a song on Sai Sreenivas and herself. After filming few sequences of a song there, the team returned to Hyderabad on 11 May. Later the shoot continued at Aluminium factory at Gachibowli in Hyderabad. The film's shoot came to an end on 23 June 2014 which was confirmed by Samantha in her micro-blogging page.

== Music ==
Devi Sri Prasad composed the music and background score for the film reuniting with V. V. Vinayak after Adhurs (2009). The film's music launch took place on 21 June 2014 at the Shilpakala Vedika in Hyderabad, with the presence of the cast and crew along with Venkatesh, S. S. Rajamouli and Pranitha Subhash as the chief guests. The soundtrack was distributed by Aditya Music on the same day to high consumer response and garnered record number of sales.

== Release ==
=== Theatrical ===
In a press meet held on 15 June 2014 the makers officially declared the film's release date as 24 July 2014. On 5 July 2014 a press note was issued which stated that the film would release a day later i.e. on 25 July 2014 in theaters. The film was awarded an 'A' certificate with few cuts by the Central Board of Film Certification on 23 July 2014.

=== Marketing ===
The first look posters were also released on the same day itself but none of them featured the title of the film. New posters were released after the shoot at Japan but they too didn't bear the title of the film. The title logo of the film was revealed on 6 June 2014. The first look poster bearing the title and few stills were released on 21 June 2014. The released stills received positive response and Samantha's look was singled out for praise. The theatrical trailer and video promos of the songs were released on 29 June 2014 and they received positive response in which Sreenivas was praised for his dances, looks, acting and fighting skills; Samantha and Tamannaah were praised for their glamour show. Particularly, Tamannaah's item number received great positive response which generated good buzz for the film.

=== Home media ===
On 28 June 2014, reports emerged that Gemini TV secured the satellite rights of the movie for an undisclosed price.

== Reception ==
=== Box office ===
==== India ====
The film opened to 80%–90% occupancy in both single screens and multiplexes and collected a distributor's share of ₹2.85 crore at both Telangana and Andhra Pradesh box offices on its first day which was called a Good start by the Trade Analysts for a debutante's film.

=== Critical response ===
The film received mixed to generally positive reviews from critics. Deccan Chronicle gave a review stating "Vinayak has chosen a safe subject for the debutant. The story is not new but director Vinayak handles it very well. This film is a great launch for a debutant. Vinayak, known for his mass films, has once again provided entertainment for masses. Brahmanandam’s comedy and Samantha’s glamour quotient may also help the film" and rated the film 3/5.

On the flip side, The Times of India gave a review stating "There's a term which is often used to describe films like Alludu Seenu in one word – 'package'. It has a little bit of everything, although the sum of these bits isn't necessarily fulfilling in the end." The Hindu gave a review stating "Director V.V. Vinayak, adept at handling commercial entertainers involving established stars, has attempted to do something similar with a newcomer. The silliness that tries to pass off as comedy is numbing, and by the time these scenes play on screen, viewers have already been conditioned not to expect anything intelligent."
