= Oka Oorilo =

- Directed by: Ramesh Varma
- Written by: Vardineedi Suresh Babu (dialogues); Swamy (dialogues)
- Screenplay by: Ramesh Varma
- Story by: Ramesh Varma
- Produced by: Chanti Addala
- Starring: Tarun; Saloni; Raja
- Cinematography: Arjun Jena
- Edited by: K. V. Krishna Reddy
- Music by: Devi Sri Prasad
- Production company: Friendly Movies
- Release date: 1 July 2005
- Country: India
- Language: Telugu

Oka Oorilo (transl. In a village) is a 2005 Indian Telugu romantic film directed by Ramesh Varma and starring Tarun, Saloni and Raja. The film's soundtrack is by Devi Sri Prasad.

== Plot ==
Seenu (Tarun), Lalitha (Saloni) and Ravi (Raja) are childhood friends in a remote village. Ravi moves to town as a kid and loses contact with Seenu and Lalitha. Seenu and Lalitha grow up together and fall in love but Seenu's father opposes their love. Seenu and Lalitha run away from their homes and accidentally meet Ravi in the city. Ravi gives them shelter in his home but suddenly Seenu goes amiss. The rest of the story is all about the ending of a love story that started in a village.

== Cast ==
- Tarun as Seenu
- Saloni as Lalitha
- Raja as Ravi
- Sunil as Seenu's servant
- Chandra Mohan
- Naresh
- Nirosha
- Hema
- MS Narayana
- Kalpana
- Ramaraju
- Yamuna
- Muralidhar
- Master Teja
- Master Karthik
- Baby Nikshipta
- Jenny
- Mounica

== Music ==
The music was composed by Devi Sri Prasad and released by Aditya Music. The song "Chandamama Okati" is reused from "Oru Dhevaloga Raani" from Maayavi.

Oka Oorilo (Modalaina Premakatha)

Soundtrack album by Devi Sri Prasad
- Released: 2005
- Recorded: 2005
- Length: 31:37
- Label: Aditya Music
- Producer: Devi Sri Prasad

Devi Sri Prasad chronology
Andarivaadu (2005)	Oka Oorilo (Modalaina Premakatha) (2005)	Mazhai (2005)

Track listing
No.	Title	Lyrics	Singer(s)	Length
1.	"Chindulese"	Ananta Sriram	Devi Sri Prasad	4:07
2.	"Chandamama Okati"	Devi Sri Prasad	Sumangali	3:23
3.	"Aakasamlo"	Ananta Sriram	Karthik, Kalpana	5:13
4.	"Ye Maikam"	Ananta Sriram	Sagar, Sumangali	4:46
5.	"Gudu Gudu Guncham"	Ananta Sriram	Tippu, Harini	4:10
6.	"Oka Oorilo"	Ananta Sriram	Mallikarjun	4:36
7.	"Dingiri Dingiri"	Ananta Sriram	Murali	5:22
Total length:				31:37

== Reception ==
A critic from Sify opined that "Though the first half is entertaining, the second half drags". A critic from Idlebrain.com wrote that "When one selects such a tender story, it is very much important to establish the emotions. The emotions in this film are not established well.".
