= Ratsasan =

2018 Indian film by Ram Kumar

- Theatrical release poster
- Directed by: Ram Kumar
- Written by: Ram Kumar
- Produced by: G. Dilli Babu; R. Sridhar
- Starring: Vishnu Vishal; Amala Paul; Saravanan
- Cinematography: P. V. Shankar
- Edited by: San Lokesh
- Music by: Ghibran
- Production company: Axess Film Factory
- Distributed by: Trident Arts and Skylark Entertainment (India); Phars Film (International)
- Release date: 5 October 2018
- Running time: 152 minutes
- Country: India
- Language: Tamil
- Box office: ₹50–60 crore

Ratsasan (transl. Demon) is a 2018 Indian Tamil-language psychological slasher film written and directed by Ram Kumar. The film stars Vishnu Vishal, Amala Paul, and Saravanan, while Kaali Venkat, Munishkanth, Vinodhini Vaidyanathan, and Abhirami play supporting roles. The film features music and a background score composed by Ghibran, cinematography by P. V. Shankar, and editing by San Lokesh. It tells the story of an aspiring film director who becomes a police officer due to family pressure and tries to track down a serial killer.

The film was released on 5 October 2018 to critical acclaim. The film was a commercial success. It was remade in Telugu as Rakshasudu and in Hindi as Cuttputlli.

== Plot ==
Two elderly men discover the corpse of Samyuktha, a fifteen-year-old schoolgirl who has been brutally murdered. Arun Kumar, an aspiring filmmaker with a deep fascination for the psychology of psychopaths, abandons his cinematic ambitions due to intense family pressure. Facilitated by his brother-in-law Doss, a Circle Inspector, Arun joins the Tamil Nadu Police as a Sub-inspector. He moves into the family residence shared by his sister Kokila, Doss, and their young daughter Ammu. Following a minor behavioral incident at Ammu's school, Arun crosses paths with her teacher, Viji, and subsequently forms a close bond with both Viji and her hearing-and-speech-impaired niece, Kayal.

Shortly into his tenure, Arun is assigned to investigate the abduction of a schoolgirl named Amudha. He immediately observes striking similarities to Samyuktha’s murder, specifically noting a distinctively mutilated doll left behind at Amudha’s residence. His superior, the dismissive ACP Lakshmi, strictly rejects his serial killer theory. However, Arun's suspicions are validated when Amudha’s corpse is recovered, and forensic pathologist Dr. Nandan confirms an identical modus operandi. Within days, another hearing-impaired student, Meera, is kidnapped and murdered in the same fashion.

The mounting pressure leads the police to target Inbaraj, a teacher at Ammu's new school. Exposed as a pedophile by a tip from one of his victims, Inbaraj admits to serial child abuse but vehemently denies committing the murders. During a chaotic escape attempt at the precinct, Inbaraj holds an officer at gunpoint, forcing Arun to shoot him dead. The relief is short-lived; that very evening, Ammu is abducted from her own birthday party, and her mutilated body is discovered hidden inside a car trunk. Devastated by the loss, Arun and Doss choose to temporarily hide the horrific reality from the grieving Kokila.

Suspended from duty following the fatal shooting of Inbaraj, a determined Arun continues his investigation unofficially. Supported by a small faction of loyal officers, he successfully traces a peculiar piano melody recorded on Meera’s recovered hearing aid to a touring magician named Annabella George, who had recently performed at every victim's school. Arun deduces that the killer uses the magic shows to scout targets before executing the abductions. Though the police place the magician's next projected target, a girl named Sanjana, under tight surveillance, the killer manages to abduct her. Arun and his team intercept the escape vehicle and rescue Sanjana, but the perpetrator eludes capture.

Seeking deeper historical context, Arun consults Rajamanickam, a retired police officer who reveals that Annabella George is merely an alias for a woman named Mary Fernandez. Mary's son, Christopher, suffers from Hutchison Gilford Syndrome, a rare genetic condition causing accelerated premature aging. Despite being a highly gifted pianist and magician, Christopher faced severe social isolation and relentless bullying at school. When his only friend, a girl named Sophia, rejected his romantic advances due to his physical condition, Christopher was deeply humiliated by his peers. In a fit of maternal rage, Mary murdered Sophia. Although both mother and son were subsequently arrested, they were presumed dead following a catastrophic accident.

Rajamanickam warns Arun that Mary might still be active, but he is murdered before he can provide further intelligence. Investigating the crime scene, Arun discovers clues revealing that Mary actually died in the accident, and it is Christopher who survived, continuously executing the murders while cross-dressing as his late mother. Before Arun can alert ACP Lakshmi, Christopher orchestrates a brutal ambush, injuring Viji and abducting Kayal.

In a desperate bid to eliminate all loose ends, Christopher murders both Officer Venkat and Dr. Nandan. Utilizing forensic clues, Arun tracks Christopher down to his secluded hideout. Following a violent and physically punishing confrontation, Arun successfully overpowers and kills Christopher, securing Kayal's safety despite sustaining severe injuries. In the aftermath, the media widely broadcasts the resolution of the serial killings. His analytical prowess vindicated, Arun is officially approached by producers to direct a feature film about a psychopath, finally realizing his lifelong creative dream.

== Cast ==
- Vishnu Vishal as SI Arun Kumar
- Amala Paul as Vijayalakshmi "Viji"
- Radha Ravi as Inspector Rajamanickkam (cameo appearance)
- Sangili Murugan as Arun's house owner
- Nizhalgal Ravi as Dr. Nandan
- Kaali Venkat as Venkat
- Munishkanth as Doss, Arun's brother-in-law and Ammu's father
- Naan Saravanan in a dual role as
  - Christopher Fernandez (Annabella George)
    - Yasar as Young Christopher
  - Mary Fernandez, Christopher's mother
- Vinodhini as Kokila, Arun's sister and Ammu's mother
- Suzane George as ACP Lakshmi IPS
- Monica as Kayal, Viji's niece who lives with Arun and Viji
- Vinod Sagar as Inbaraj
- Usha Elizabeth as Arun's mother
- Gajaraj as Gajaraj, Senior Police Officer
- Pasupathi as Pasupathi
- Jai Anand as Anbarasu, Police Officer
- Thangam Paramanantham as Simon, Police officer
- Sanjay as Inspector Durai Raj
- Abhirami as Ammu, Arun's niece
- Raveena Daha as Sharmi, Ammu's classmate
- Ragavi Renu as Sophie, Christopher's love interest
- Trishala in a dual role as:
  - Sanjana
  - Sangeetha
- Priya as Meera
- Ravishankar as Amudha's father
- Rekha Padmanaban as Amudha's mother
- Geetha Narayanan as Sanjana's and Sangeetha's school principal

Uncredited

- Neha Menon as Amudha
- Adhithri Dinesh as Samyuktha
- Akshay as Mahesh, Ammu's classmate also one who loves Ammu
- Kumar Das as Auto Driver Kumar, Inbaraj's helper
- Karunakaran as himself (cameo appearance)
- Ghibran as himself (cameo appearance)

== Production ==
Following the release of the comedy Mundasupatti (2014), Ramkumar was keen to do a serious film to avoid being typecast. He was inspired to write a film on a psycho killer after reading an international news story about the Russian serial killer Alexander Spesivtsev, and spent close to a year writing a fictional screenplay to fit around the character of a psycho killer. Ramkumar initially struggled to find an actor to play the lead role of a forty-year-old man with a child, and despite working the child out of the script as a result, he still found it difficult to convince actors to sign the film. In April 2016, actor Jai signed the project titled Ratsasan, which was set to be produced by C. V. Kumar of Thirukumaran Entertainment. However, soon after the actor and director dropped out of the project, and producer took the title of Ratsasan with him. Subsequently, throughout the production stage, the film was briefly known as Cinderella and then Minmini, but neither title was kept. The former title was claimed by another Tamil film's producers, while Ramkumar felt the latter seemed too light-hearted. Eventually, the team members managed to amicably convince Kumar to offer them the title of Ratsasan.

Production began in November 2016, with principal photography starting in June 2017. Ramkumar chose to make the film with producer Dilli Babu and starring Vishnu in July 2017. Amala Paul joined the cast of the film in late November 2017, with production starting thereafter. In June 2017, the title of the film was changed to Ratsasan.

== Music ==
Ratsasan

Soundtrack album by Ghibran
- Released: 27 September 2018
- Recorded: 2017–2018
- Genre: Film soundtrack
- Length: 14:13
- Language: Tamil
- Label: Saregama
- Producer: Ghibran

Ghibran chronology
Aan Devathai (2018)	Ratsasan (2018)	Athiran (2019)

Singles from Ratsasan
- 1. "Kaadhal Kadal Dhana" Released: 15 September 2018

Ghibran composed the soundtrack and background score of Ratsasan. He began composing the soundtrack in early 2017. He also finished composing the theme music for the film's teaser in August 2018. The album features four songs composed by Ghibran and lyrics written by Umadevi, Ramkumar, Ratnakumar and GKB. One song, "Kaadhal Kadal Dhana", was released as a single on 15 September 2018.

The album was released on 27 September 2018, at the Suryan FM Radio Station, Chennai featuring the composer and other crew members present during the crew members present in the event. V. Lakshmi from The Times of India gave a positive review for the soundtrack and stated "Kaadhal Kadal Dhana" as "a romantic melody, a genre that Ghibran is a master at. Slow and lullaby-like, the persistent strings in the background are soothing, and despite distinct arrangements, the vocals are pronounced enough to make an impact".

Track listing
No.	Title	Lyrics	Singers	Length
1.	"Kaadhal Kadal Dhana"	Umadevi	D. Sathyaprakash, Chaitra Ambadipudi	3:26
2.	"Hey Piriyame Piriyame"	Ratnakumar	Yazin Nizar, Anudeep Dev, Pragathi Guruprasad, Ratnakumar	3:50
3.	"Kanamma Kanvizhi"	Ramkumar	Sean Roldan	3:27
4.	"Maayangal Naanada" (Theme Song)	GKB	Yazin Nizar, Ranjth, Shabir, Shenbagaraj, Narayanan	3:30
Total length:				14:13

== Release ==
=== Theatrical ===
Ratsasan was released worldwide on 5 October 2018.

=== Home media ===
The film had its television premiere on 16 January 2019 on Sun TV.

== Reception ==
Ratsasan received highly positive reviews from critics. On the review aggregator website Rotten Tomatoes, 95% of 4 critics' reviews are positive, with an average rating of 8.3/10.

The Times of India gave it a 3.5/5, stating that "Ratsasan is a competent thriller, for the most part. There is a tautness to the storytelling, especially until the interval block, that keeps us hooked." Sreedhar Pillai of Firstpost, rated 3 out of 5 stars, stating that "Vishnu Vishal's cop act is superlative but this thriller could've done with some trimming". India Today rated 3 out of 5 stars, and commented "Vishnu Vishal's Ratsasan' is one of the biggest releases in K-Town this week. The film is a carefully-written thriller, that has a few great moments, says our review." Baradwaj Rangan of Film Companion South called it "If you turn a blind eye to the coincidences (say, the plot point around an autorickshaw) and the obvious red herrings (a suspected killer), the bulk of Ratsasan works. Ghibran's terrific score is the aural equivalent of bad airplane food — it makes your tummy queasy. After Mundasupatti and Ratsasan, I'm definitely pumped about what Ram Kumar has in store next". The News Minute, commented about the movie that "The film feels like a mix of all the psycho killer films you've seen before, but this surprisingly works for it."

== Accolades ==
Awards and nominations
Date of Ceremony	Award	Category	Recipients	Result	Ref.
5 January 2019	Ananda Vikatan Cinema Awards	Best Editing	San Lokesh	Won	
25–28 April 2019	Norway Tamil Film Festival Awards	Best Actor	Vishnu Vishal	Nominated	
25–28 April 2019	Norway Tamil Film Festival Awards	Best Villain	Saravanan	Won	
25–28 April 2019	Norway Tamil Film Festival Awards	Best Editor	San Lokesh	Nominated	
25–28 April 2019	Norway Tamil Film Festival Awards	Best Screenplay	Ram Kumar	Nominated	
25–28 April 2019	Norway Tamil Film Festival Awards	Best Music Director	Ghibran	Nominated	
16 August 2019	8th South Indian International Movie Awards	Best Debut Actor	Saravanan	Nominated	
August 2019	Oniros Film Awards	Best Soundtrack	Ghibran	Won	
August 2019	Oniros Film Awards	Best Thriller	Axess Film Factory	Won	
August 2019	Diamond Film Awards	Best Original Score	Ghibran	Won	
20 September 2019	Los Angeles Theatrical Release Competition & Awards (LATCA)	Best Musical Score	Ghibran	Won	
20 September 2019	Los Angeles Theatrical Release Competition & Awards (LATCA)	Best Action Sequence	Ghibran	Won	
21 December 2019	66th Filmfare Awards South	Best Film	G. Dilli Babu, R. Sridhar	Nominated	
21 December 2019	66th Filmfare Awards South	Best Director	Ram Kumar	Won	
29 January 2026	Tamil Nadu State Film Awards	Best Actor (Special Prize)	Vishnu Vishal	Won	
29 January 2026	Tamil Nadu State Film Awards	Best Editor	San Lokesh	Won	

== Remakes ==
The film was remade in Telugu as Rakshasudu (2019) and in Hindi as Cuttputlli (2022).
