= Rakshasudu (2019 film) =

2019 Indian film by Ramesh Varma

- Theatrical release poster
- Directed by: Ramesh Varma
- Screenplay by: Ramesh Varma
- Story by: Ram Kumar
- Based on: Ratsasan by Ram Kumar
- Produced by: Havish; Satyanarayana Koneru
- Starring: Bellamkonda Sreenivas; Anupama Parameswaran
- Cinematography: Venkat Dilip Chunduru
- Edited by: Amar Reddy Kudumula
- Music by: Ghibran
- Production company: A Studio
- Distributed by: Abhishek Pictures
- Release date: 2 August 2019
- Running time: 149 minutes
- Country: India
- Language: Telugu
- Budget: ₹22 crore
- Box office: est. ₹35 crore

Rakshasudu (transl. Demon) is a 2019 Indian Telugu-language psychological thriller film directed by Ramesh Varma. The film stars Bellamkonda Sreenivas and Anupama Parameswaran, and it is the official remake of the 2018 Tamil film Ratsasan.

The soundtrack was composed by Ghibran. The film began production in March 2019 and was released on 2 August 2019. The film was released to positive reviews and went to become a commercial success at the box office, grossing over ₹35 crore globally.

== Plot ==
Two elderly men discover the corpse of Samyuktha, a 15-year-old school student who was brutally murdered and wrapped in a polythene bag.

Arun Kumar is an aspiring filmmaker who wants to make a film about psychopaths. After repeated rejections despite having a good script, and under pressure from his family, he decides to become a sub-inspector with the help of his brother-in-law, police officer Prasad. Arun moves in with Prasad, his sister Sapna, and their daughter Siri. After Siri gets Arun to forge her father's signature on her report card, her teacher Krishnaveni suspects that Siri signed it herself. Siri takes Arun to school to pose as her father, but her parents discover the deception and transfer her to another school. Arun later befriends Krishnaveni and her niece Kavya, who is speech deprived.

A 15-year-old schoolgirl, Amrutha, is abducted while returning home. Her parents receive a gift box containing a mutilated doll's head, attached to their dog's collar. Arun notices similarities between Amrutha and Samyuktha: both were 15-year-old students abducted on their way home, and both victims have wounds resembling those inflicted on the doll. The hair on its forehead has been uprooted, its eyes drilled out, and its mouth damaged; Samyuktha also had knife marks on her forehead, ears and nasion. Arun believes a psychopath is responsible, but his superior, ACP Lakshmi, dismisses his theory.

Amrutha's mutilated corpse is subsequently found. Her eyes have been drilled out, her teeth broken and patches of hair uprooted, while she has also suffered stab wounds inflicted while alive. Arun proposes hiding the bodies to prevent the killer from gaining attention. Although officials initially object on procedural grounds, the bodies are eventually moved to a secret facility under Dr. Kishore. Another schoolgirl, Meera, is then abducted from Siri's former school. The investigation leads to Somaraj, a teacher at Siri's current school and a pedophile who preys on schoolgirls. Arun catches him attempting to molest Siri and detains him. Somaraj admits to being a sexual predator but denies the murders. When he takes policeman Venkat hostage while attempting to escape, Arun shoots him inside a lift, saving Venkat.

Siri is then abducted from her birthday party. Arun and Prasad find what appears to be her mutilated body in their car boot. Arun is suspended for his handling of Somaraj's shooting and, distraught, continues investigating with several policemen. An audio recording recovered from Meera's hearing aid leads him to an elderly magician, Annabella George, who had performed at the victims' school. Arun realises that the magician used her shows to gain students' trust before stalking and abducting them. He identifies Sanjana as the next potential victim, but learns that she has a twin sister and realises he has been watching the wrong girl. Sanjana is abducted despite police surveillance. Arun tracks her to a house and rescues her just before she is murdered. The perpetrator escapes but is identified as Mary Fernandez, who had been involved in a killing years earlier.

Retired police officer Jaya Prakash explains Mary's history. Her son Christopher had Werner syndrome, a hormonal disorder that caused him to appear prematurely aged, making him an outcast at school. A girl named Sophie befriended him, and Christopher developed feelings for her. After she rejected him and later insulted his illness during an argument, she attempted to reconcile with him the following day. Mary gave Sophie a gift box containing the mutilated head of the doll Sophie had once given Christopher, then brutally murdered her. Mary and Christopher were arrested.

Jaya Prakash reveals that both subsequently suffered an accident and assumes Mary survived and resumed the killings. He discovers a crucial clue and calls Arun, but Mary kills him before they can meet. Arun is detained after being found at the crime scene. He learns that Jaya Prakash had discovered that the magician appearing at the schools had six fingers on the right hand. Photographic evidence shows that Christopher has six fingers. Arun deduces that Mary died in the accident and that Christopher has been disguising himself as his mother, exploiting his aged appearance. It is also revealed that Christopher, not Mary, murdered Sophie, with Mary acting only as his accomplice.

Before Arun can intervene, Christopher attacks Krishnaveni and abducts Kavya. Venkat encounters Christopher during a phone call with Arun and recognises him as the killer, but Christopher overpowers and kills him. Kavya escapes and is found by Dr. Kishore, who attempts to conceal her at the facility but is killed protecting her. Christopher corners Kavya, but Arun tracks him to the facility. After a prolonged fight, Arun kills Christopher and rescues Kavya.

Hospitalised, Arun watches a news report about the case and the end of the killings. Although he caught and killed Christopher, the police department receives the credit. Arun then receives an offer to make a film about a psychopath, fulfilling his dream.

== Cast ==
- Bellamkonda Sreenivas as SI Arun
- Anupama Parameswaran as Krishnaveni
- Saravanan in a dual role as:
  - Christopher Fernandez (Annabella George)
    - Yasar as Young Christopher
  - Mary Fernandez
- Ammu Abhirami as Siri, Arun's niece
- Baby Dua as Kavya, Krishnaveni's niece
- Rajeev Kanakala as Prasad, Siri's father and Arun's brother-in-law
- Vinodhini as Padma, Siri's mother and Arun's sister
- Keshav Deepak as Venkat
- Suzane George as ACP Lakshmi IPS
- Surya as Dr. Kishore
- Kasi Viswanath as Police Constable Viswanath
- Ravi Prakash as Police Officer Sravan
- Raghavi Renu as Sophie, Christopher's friend
- Raveena Daha as Sharmi, Siri's classmate
- Trishala in a dual role as:
  - Sanjana
  - Sangeetha
- Priya as Meera
- Vinod Sagar as School Teacher Sobharaj
- Kotesh Manava as Police Officer Koteswara Rao
- Radha Ravi as Inspector Jaya Prakash (cameo appearance)
- Ghibran as himself (cameo appearance)
- Noel Sean as himself (cameo appearance)

== Production ==
The success of the film Ratsasan put high expectation amongst audiences. Due to this reason the remake rights price for this film went high. After the stiff competition, Koneru Satynarayana, the chairman of the educational university KL University Vijayawada bagged the Telugu remake rights of the film. The makers started this remake on Feb 2019 and completed it in June.

== Music ==
Rakshasudu

Soundtrack album by Ghibran
- Released: 27 July 2019
- Recorded: 2019
- Studio: Aksharaa Sound Forge
- Genre: Feature film soundtrack
- Length: 14:34
- Label: Aditya Music
- Producer: Ghibran

Ghibran chronology
Kadaram Kondan (2019)	Rakshasudu (2019)	Sixer (2019)
External audio
- Official Audio Jukebox on YouTube

The film's score and soundtrack are composed by Ghibran and released on Aditya Music label.

Track list
No.	Title	Lyrics	Singer(s)	Length
1.	"Chinni Chinni Chinikulu"	Sri Mani	Sid Sriram	3:22
2.	"Naa Chinni Thalli"	Chandrabose	Kaala Bhairava, Ghibran	3:57
3.	"Cheekattlo Kamme"	Rakendu Mouli	Shabir, Ghibran	3:58
4.	"Kallaloo Merupu"	Rakendu Mouli	Yazin Nizar, Ghibran	3:17
Total length:				14:34

== Release ==
Rakshasudu was initially scheduled to release on 18 July 2019, but was pushed to August release. The film was released on 2 August 2019.

== Reception ==
=== Box office ===
Rakshasudu collected ₹3.9 Crores gross and ₹2.3 Crores share worldwide on the opening day. In the first weekend movie collected ₹8.76 Crores gross and ₹5.48 Crores share in the Telugu speaking states (Andhra Pradesh & Telangana) and ₹13.6 Crores gross and ₹6.8 Crores share worldwide. In the first week movie collected ₹17.1 Crores gross and ₹9 Crores share worldwide.

=== Critical response ===
Rakshasudu received positive reviews from audiences and critics, The Times of India gave 3.5 out of 5 stars stating "Rakshashudu keeps viewers on the edge of their seats. The screenplay is spot on and adds to the intrigue of watching the film and makes sure the suspense is impactful. Director Ramesh Varma avoids the temptation to over indulge. Bellamkonda puts in one of his best performances till date". Firstpost gave 3.5 out of 5 stars stating, "The biggest strength of Rakshasudu lies in its staging and how well-knit the whole narrative is. Editing by Amar Reddy is another major asset and there is hardly a boring moment in the film. For Sreenivas, film is a major shot in the arm and huge improvement compared to his recent performances". India Today gave 3 out of 5 stars stating "Bellamkonda Sai Sreenivas's Rakshasudu is a frame-to-frame remake of Tamil film Ratsasan. While the cop-thriller shows lazy film-making in parts, it still keeps you engrossed in the proceedings. Ghibran's haunting score, which speaks volumes".

Jeevi of Idlebrain.com gave 3 out of 5 stars stating, "Plus points are performances, story and screenplay. On the flipside, there is a bit of Tamil flavour (lacking Telugu nativity) in casting some of the actors and in some of the scenes. The dark approach of describing gruesome nature and killing techniques is not recommended for everybody". Great Andhra gave 3 out of 5 stars stating "Rakshasudu is Sreenivas's better act among all his movies. Musical background score by Ghibran and the sound design have actually elevated the movie. The sound is terrific. Production values are perfect". Sify gave 3 out of 5 stars stating "Rakshasudu is a fairly captivating serial-killer thriller with some edge of the seat moments. Aided by Ghibran's music and sound design, the film provides enough thrills".
