= Ramesh Varma =

Indian film director, producer, and screenwriter

- Born: Penmetsa Ramesh Varma; Bhimavaram, Andhra Pradesh, India
- Education: BCom, Osmania University
- Occupations: Film director, producer, screenwriter
- Years active: 2003–present
- Spouse: Rekha Varma

Penmetsa Ramesh Varma is an Indian film director, producer, and screenwriter, who works predominantly in Telugu cinema.

== Early life ==
Born in Bhimavaram, West Godavari district of Andhra Pradesh, Varma finished his B.Com. from Osmania University and began his career as publicity designer along the footsteps of his father P. Prasad Raju, who was then working as a sketching artist at Eenadu Colorama, Ramoji Film City.

== Career ==
After completing his graduation in 1998, he designed poster ads under his firm named "Kiran Poster Ads", with his first film Preminchukundam Raa (1998). He was also a publicity designer for the films Narasimhanaidu, Tagore, Jalsa, Robot, and the Bollywood films Kuch Tum Kaho Kuch Hum Kahein, and Hum Aapke Dil Mein Rehte Hain.

Varma directed a film Oka Oorilo (2005) starring actor Tarun. His next film as a director was Ride (2009) followed by Veera (2011) with Ravi Teja, and Abbayitho Ammayi (2016). He was screenwriter for Havish Koneru's 7 (2019) followed by Bellamkonda Srinivas' suspense thriller Rakshasudu (2019).

He produced two films as well: Jaffa (2013), and Seven in 2019, and has penned story for film Mallepuvvu.

== Filmography ==
| Year | Film | Director | Producer | Story | Screenplay | Notes |
|---|---|---|---|---|---|---|
| 2005 | Oka Oorilo | Yes | No | Yes | Yes | |
| 2008 | Mallepuvvu | No | No | Yes | No | |
| 2009 | Ride | Yes | No | Yes | Yes | |
| 2011 | Veera | Yes | No | No | No | |
| 2013 | Jaffa | No | Yes | No | No | |
| 2016 | Abbayitho Ammayi | Yes | No | No | No | |
| 2019 | 7 | No | Yes | Yes | Yes | Bilingual film |
| 2019 | Rakshasudu | Yes | No | No | Yes | |
| 2022 | Khiladi | Yes | No | Yes | Yes | |
| 2025 | Kaala Bhairava | Yes | No | No | No | |
