= Dhamaka (2022 film) =

2022 Indian film by Trinadha Rao Nakkina

- Theatrical release poster
- Directed by: Trinadha Rao Nakkina
- Written by: Prasanna Kumar Bezawada
- Produced by: Abhishek Agarwal; T. G. Vishwa Prasad
- Starring: Ravi Teja; Jayaram; Sreeleela
- Cinematography: Karthik Gattamneni
- Edited by: Prawin Pudi
- Music by: Bheems Ceciroleo
- Production companies: People Media Factory; Abhishek Agarwal Arts
- Release date: 23 December 2022
- Running time: 139 minutes
- Country: India
- Language: Telugu
- Budget: ₹35 crore
- Box office: ₹110 crore

Dhamaka (transl. Blast) is a 2022 Indian Telugu-language action comedy film directed by Trinadha Rao Nakkina, written by Prasanna Kumar Bezawada, and produced by People Media Factory and Abhishek Agarwal Arts. It stars Ravi Teja, Sreeleela, Jayaram, Chirag Jani, Sachin Khedekar, Tanikella Bharani and Rao Ramesh. The soundtrack and musical score was composed by Bheems Ceciroleo, while cinematography and editing were handled by Karthik Gattamneni and Prawin Pudi.

Principal photography commenced in October 2021 and ended in September 2022, which took place in Hyderabad and Spain.

Dhamaka was released on 23 December 2022, during the Christmas weekend, and received mixed-to-positive reviews from critics with praise for its cast performances (particularly Ravi Teja), humor and music, but criticized its pace, script and plot. The film grossed over ₹110 crore worldwide, making it one of the highest-grossing Telugu films of 2022 as well the highest-grossing film of Ravi Teja's career until it was surpassed by Irumudi.

== Plot ==
Jayan Pakshitap alias JP, a business magnate and head of J. P. Orbit, is known for taking over companies in a ruthless manner. He sets his sights on Nanda Gopal Chakravarthy's People Mart and decides to present it as a birthday gift to his son Atharva Pakshitap. However, JP faces problems from Nanda Gopal's son Anand Chakravarthy, who is also the company's upcoming CEO. JP decides to overthrow him and acquire the company.

Swami, a street-smart unemployed man and Anand's doppelganger, lives with his family consisting of his father Vasudeva Rao, mother Yashoda, and younger sister Subbu. Swami tries to find work and gets constantly burdened by Subbu's impending wedding. Pranavi, Subbu's friend, meets Swami while planning for Subbu's wedding, where they get attracted to each other. Ramesh Reddy, Pranavi's father and Chakravarthy's friend, arranges a marriage alliance with Anand. Initially, Pranavi is confused upon seeing Anand; whether to choose Swami over Anand and ultimately rejects the proposal, which leads Ramesh to send goons to kill Swami.

At the same time, Atharva and his goons corner Anand to kill him. Pranavi calls Swami for help but later learns that Anand is actually Swami himself. Swami thrashes Ramesh and Atharva's goons but gets knocked out by one of them and is presumed dead. However, Swami survives and fakes his death. Pranavi asks him about living as dual people. Swami reveals that he met Chakravarthy in his childhood when he and Vasudeva went missing at the local fair. Chakravarthy tried to locate Swami's parents, but he instead adopted him as his son. Four years later, Swami's parents arrived in search of him and Chakravarthy was hesitant to send him back with them. In order to keep both families happy, Swami assumed dual identities.

Meanwhile, JP, who is under the impression that Anand is dead, asks Swami to act as Anand and makes the company shares to be distributed to J. P. Orbit. A sequence of comedic events ensues, where Swami manages to fool JP and Atharva every time while arranging Subbu's marriage and donating his shares to the employees. However, JP discovers Swami's dual identities and tries to kill Chakravarthy, but Swami saves him. Swami also saves Vasudeva and thrashes both JP and Atharva.

Swami reveals to Chakravarthy that his nephew Vikram Chakravarthy was also behind the attempt on Anand's life as he became an obstacle for him to become the next CEO. Swami tells Vikram that Anand wanted him to become the CEO, upon which Vikram realizes his mistake and apologizes to Swami and his family, reuniting with them. With Vikram becoming the CEO, Swami and Pranavi happily get married and both families lead a normal and happy life.

== Cast ==
- Ravi Teja as Swami Vivekanand Chakravarthy
- Jayaram as Jayan Pakshitap (JP)
- Sreeleela as Pranavi Reddy
- Sachin Khedekar as Nanda Gopal Chakravarthy, Swami'S adoptive father
- Tanikella Bharani as Vasudeva Rao, Swami/Anand’s father
- Rao Ramesh as Ramesh Reddy, Pranavi’s father
- Giri Babu as Rama Chandra Murthy,Anand's friend father
- Chandra Mohan as Chandram, Swami's father
- Chirag Jani as Atharva Pakshitap, J.P.’s son
- Ali as J.P.’s assistant
- Praveen as Swami/Anand's friend
- Hyper Aadi as Ramesh’s driver
- Pavitra Lokesh as Yashoda Chakravarthy, Nanda Gopal's wife
- Brahmanandam as Lakshma Reddy, Swami/Anand's friend
- Suhasini Maniratnam as Snehalatha, Swami/Anand's friend mother
- Janaki Sabesh as Rajyalakshmi, Swami/Anand’s adoptive mother
- Tulasi as Devaki Rao, Swami’s mother
- Mounika Reddy as Subbu, Swami’s sister
- Kireeti Damaraju as Subbu’s fiance
- Sritej as Vikram Chakravarthy, Nanda Gopal’s nephew
- Vadlamani Srinivas as Vikram’s father
- Rajshree Nair as Ragaa, Pranavi’s mother
- Anish Kuruvilla as DGP
- Sameer as Sanjay, Nanda Gopal’s assistant
- Raghu Babu as Goon
- Satyam Rajesh as Eveteaser
- Krishna Bhagavaan as Diaper Company MD
- B. V. S. Ravi as Malakpeta Mallesh
- Chammak Chandra
- Sravan

== Production ==
The film's title was revealed in October 2021. Principal photography of the film began on 4 October 2021. The first schedule was completed in November 2021. The makers shot an action sequence in February 2022 in Hyderabad. The makers also shot a song in Spain's Plaza de España in March 2022. The filming was wrapped on 22 September 2022.

== Music ==
The music of the film is composed by Bheems Ceciroleo. The first single titled "Jinthaak" was released on 18 August 2022. The second single titled "Mass Raja" was released on 23 September 2022.

track listings
No.	Title	Lyrics	Singer(s)	Length
1.	"Jinthaak"	Kasarla Shyam	Bheems Ceciroleo, Mangli	3:45
2.	"Mass Raja"	Ramajogayya Sastry	Nakash Aziz	3:42
3.	"What's Happening"	Ramajogayya Sastry	Ramya Behara, Bhargavi Pillai	4:40
4.	"Du Du Du"	Ramajogayya Sastry	Prudvi Chandra	2:51
5.	"Dandakadiyal"	Bheems Ceciroleo	Bheems Ceciroleo, Sahithi Chaganti, Mangli	4:22
6.	"Pulsar Bike"	Ramajogayya Sastry	Bheems Ceciroleo	2:10
7.	"What's Happening (Yohani version)"	Janakirao Ramana	Yohani	4:39

== Release ==
=== Theatrical ===
Dhamaka was theatrically released on 23 December 2022. The worldwide theatrical rights of the film were sold at a cost of ₹18.30 crore. The Hindi dubbing rights were sold at a cost of ₹10 crore, whereas the satellite and digital streaming rights were sold for ₹20 crore.

=== Home media ===
The satellite and digital distribution rights of the film were acquired by Netflix and Star Maa, while the Hindi version of the film were sold to ZEE5. The film was streamed on 22 January 2023 in Netflix.

== Reception ==
Dhamaka received mixed reviews from critics with praise for its cast performances (particularly Ravi Teja), humor and music, but criticized its pace, script and plot.

=== Critical reception ===
Paul Nicodemus of The Times of India gave 3/5 stars and wrote "Overall, Dhamaka is an action-packed comedy that relies heavily on mass entertainment quotient. Ravi Teja’s energy and Sreeleela’s glamour make this routine story an entertaining watch."

Ram Venkat Srikar of Cinema Express gave 3/5 stars and wrote "Dhamaka, in all, delivers what it promised. It is a self-aware entertainer that doesn't want to do anything more than entertain the audience. It feels engineered to cater to the masses, but that's fine because it largely succeeds in doing what it set out to do."Idlebrain gave 2.75/5 stars and wrote "Dhamaka depends majorly on Ravi Teja’s energetic/comic performance and entertainment/mass episodes. A better second half would have done wonders to the film. It works partly and is going to entertain all classes to a certain degree."

Srivathsan Nadadhur of OTTplay gave 2.5/5 stars and wrote "Dhamaka lacks a novel plot but it gives exactly what would one expect from a typical Ravi Teja entertainer and a director like Trinadha Rao Nakkina, who has films like Cinema Choopistha Mava and Nenu Local under his belt. Sreeleela proves to be a natural with comedy and the song-dance routine, continuing her good form after Pelli SandaD. However, the star of the show is Prasanna Kumar Bezawada, with his terrific one-liners and an entertaining screenplay." Janani K of India Today gave 2/5 stars and wrote "10 minutes into the film, we get a deja vu feeling as it reminds you of Ala Vaikunthapurramuloo". Balakrishna Ganeshan of The News Minute gave 1.5/5 stars and wrote "The genre of Dhamaka is fluid. It keeps jumping from one genre to another and finally ends up being a different variant of Trivikram’s Ala Vaikunthapurramuloo".

=== Box office ===
Dhamaka grossed ₹10 crore worldwide on its opening day, including ₹7.55 crore gross domestically (India). The opening day share from Andhra Pradesh and Telangana markets together stood at ₹4.40 crore. In its opening weekend, the film has collected a worldwide gross of ₹32 crore. In India, the film has made a net collection of ₹20.50 crore in the opening weekend surpassing the Hindi film Cirkus which opened to ₹20.10 crore.

News18 Telugu reported the worldwide gross to be ₹68.45 crore, after 11 days of the release, with a distributors' share of ₹36.17 crore.

== Accolades ==
Award (Note: Awards, festivals and organizations are in alphabetical order.)	Date of ceremony (Note: Date is linked to the article about the awards held that year, wherever possible.)	Category	Recipient(s)	Result	Ref.
South Indian International Movie Awards	2023	SIIMA Award for Best Actress – Telugu	Sreeleela	Won	
South Indian International Movie Awards	2023	Best Female Playback Singer – Female	Mangli ("Jinthaak")	Won	
