= Jai (2004 Tamil film) =

2004 film by S. Narayan

- DVD cover
- Directed by: S. Narayan
- Written by: Jai Prabhakar (dialogues)
- Story by: V. V. Vinayak
- Based on: Aadi (Telugu)
- Produced by: Thiagarajan
- Starring: Prashanth; Anshu
- Cinematography: P. K. H. Dass
- Edited by: P. R. Soundar Raj
- Music by: Mani Sharma
- Production company: Lakshmi Shanthi Movies
- Release date: 14 January 2004
- Running time: 163 minutes
- Country: India
- Language: Tamil

Jai is a 2004 Indian Tamil-language action film directed by S. Narayan. The film stars Prashanth and Anshu, while the former's father Thiagarajan, along with Rajkiran, Bhanupriya, and Rajan P. Dev play supporting roles. A remake of the 2002 Telugu film Aadi, it was produced by Thiagarajan and has music composed by Mani Sharma. Jai was released on 14 January 2004 and underperformed at the box office.

== Plot ==
Nallamuthu meets Veerapandi, his wife, and eight-year-old son Jai returning from the US after a long gap. Veerapandi's late father was a well-known factionist in that area and owned 4,000 acres (1,600 ha) of land. While leaving for USA, Veerapandi gave the responsibility of managing this land to Vajravelu. Now back in India, Veerapandi realises that Vajravelu has been misusing his power. He wants to donate all his land to the 2000 families staying in that village. When Vajravelu learns of this impending charity, he attacks Veerapandi, killing him and his wife. Nallamuthu, being a trusted lieutenant of Veerapandi, takes Jai and escapes to the city. After the murders, Veerapandi's trusted people are imprisoned for 14 years.

After 14 years, the now grown up Jai studies in a college and falls in love with Nandhini, who is Vajravelu's daughter. Nallamuthu has raised Jai in Chennai as a fun-loving boy, but he grows up as a hot-tempered young lad. Completing her studies, Nandhini returns to her hometown. Jai comes along with other trusted members of his father who are released from jail. Nallamuthu seeks vengeance on Vajravelu and get back all the land so that he can distribute it to the villagers. The rest of the film deals with how Jai succeeds in avenging his parents.

== Cast ==
- Prashanth as Jaya "Jai" Veerapandi
- Anshu as Nandhini
- Thiagarajan as Veerapandi
- Rajkiran as Nallamuthu
- Bhanupriya as Veerapandi's wife/Jai's mother
- Rajan P. Dev as Vajravelu
- Seetha as Vajravelu's wife
- Dhamu as College Student
- Vaiyapuri as College Student
- Sathyan as College Student
- Ponnambalam as Karuppu
- Devan as Nandhini's uncle
- Doddanna as College Principal
- Robert as Mohan
- Arvind Kathare as Vajravelu's son
- Janagaraj
- Kuyili
- Shakeela
- Pandu as Pandu
- Sukumar
- Sharmili
- Jayamurali
- Sindhu
- Simran (special appearance in the song "Alek")
- Mumaith Khan for a dance sequence
- Zabyn Khan for a dance sequence
- Nathan Shyam as Nandini's suitor (uncredited)

== Production ==
Thiagarajan purchased the remake rights of the successful of V. V. Vinayak's successful Telugu film Aadi (2002) and signed on R. Madhesh to be the film's director. An initial pre-production poster of the film was reported in the media to have attracted a clash with another film in production during the period, Saamy (2003), which featured Prashanth's paternal cousin Vikram. Madhesh planned Tibet as a potential location to film and began negotiations with international stunt choreographers Sammo Hung and Yuen Woo-ping to have them in the film. However, after filming a song featuring Prashanth and lead actress Simran which was choreographed by Remo D'Souza, he left the project and began work on another film Madhurey, starring Vijay. He was then replaced by Kannada director S. Narayan, who with the venture marked his debut in Tamil cinema. Simran also subsequently left the project and the song which had been shot was converted into an item number, the song was shot at AVM Studios with a set erected costing 1 and half crore with using a technology called Mirror Image. The team then approached Preity Zinta, though the actress was unwilling to commit to star in a Tamil film during the period. Subsequently, the team signed on London based actress Anshu Ambani, who had appeared in the Telugu films Manmadhudu (2002) and Raghavendra (2003). Producer Thiagarajan also made an acting comeback with the film after a long gap with Jai and featured as father to his real life son, Prashanth, while Rajkiran and Rajan P. Dev (who played the role in original film) were signed on for other pivotal roles. The film was briefly put on hold while Prashanth considered starting another project titled Soldier, but plans were shelved and Jai progressed.

The film adapted a Madurai backdrop instead of the Telugu backdrop in the original, although the second schedule was canned in Nanakramguda, Hyderabad. Two songs from the film were shot in Sri Lanka, while stuntmen from Netherlands, Malaysia and Nigeria were selected to be a part of the film. The film was titled Jai because Prashanth's successful film Jeans (1998) started with the same English letter.

== Soundtrack ==
The soundtrack was composed by Mani Sharma.

Song	Lyrics	Singer(s)
"Aazhaakku Neyya"	Vaali	Tippu, Kalpana Raghavendar
"Kanavu Kaanalaam"	Ilakkiyan	Vijay Yesudas, K. S. Chithra
"Kanna Simittina"	Pa. Vijay	Karthik, Mahalakshmi Iyer
"Alek"	Vairamuthu	Kalpana, Shankar Mahadevan
"Medhu Medhuvai"	Thamarai	K. S. Chithra, S. P. Balasubrahmanyam
"Shockadikkuthu"	Pa. Vijay	Ranjith, Suchitra

== Reception ==
A critic from Sify called the film "tedious" and added that "all the hype about Jai being big budget extravaganza seems out of place as the story is as old as the hills. Simran's appearance in an item number fails to impress. On the whole Prashanth has to try out something new." Malini Mannath of Chennai Online wrote, "More attention seems to have been paid to the glamour element and the picturisation of the dance numbers than on the rest of the film". Malathi Rangarajan of The Hindu revealed "the ballyhoo for many a scene including the opening one is puzzling because it gives the impression that something big is to follow suit, but nothing of that sort happens". G. Ulaganathan of Deccan Herald said Prashanth "has done justice to his role", but criticised the excessive violence and clichéd plot, and director Narayan "made an appreciable effort". Cinesouth wrote "For the amount spent in making the film it has nothing. Prashanth shines only in the action scenes. It is sad that everything has gone a waste in the film and this could have been avoided. The director could have concentrated on the screenplay, as the story is just old wine in new bottle". M Bharat Kumar of News Today wrote "The lavishly- made movie lacks depth in screenplay and the scenes unfold rather quickly leaving the audience clueless on the story".

The film became a box office failure. Post-release, Prashanth noted that as a producer of the film, the team had tried hard but ran into problems to begin with, lamenting that the project had been delayed by a year before filming started and thus the script lost its freshness.
