= Nuvvala Nenila =

- Theatrical release poster
- Directed by: Trinadha Rao Nakkina
- Produced by: Induri Rajasekhar Reddy
- Starring: Varun Sandesh; Poorna
- Cinematography: Gnana Shekar V. S.
- Edited by: Shravan Katikaneni
- Music by: Sai Karthik
- Production company: Amogh Creations
- Release date: 8 August 2014
- Country: India
- Language: Telugu

Nuvvala Nenila (transl. Like You, Like Me) is a 2014 Indian Telugu-language film starring Varun Sandesh and Poorna in the lead roles. The movie is directed by Trinadha Rao Nakkina and it is his second film with Varun Sandesh after Priyathama Neevachata Kushalama. Induri Rajasekhar Reddy produced the film while Sai Karthik would score the music. The film would start its regular shooting from 13 February 2013.

== Plot ==
Krishna Mohan 'Krish' is an NRI who comes to India for business reasons. He meets his project manager, Mahalakshmi 'Mahi', a traditional girl; they eventually become good friends rather than the boss and the employee. Krish believes love is an emotional game with some rules and regulations to follow. Mahi believes that love is life. Krish has a possessive girlfriend called Jennifer, whom he constantly avoids. Mahi has a boy friend called Gopi, who also constantly avoids her. Time passes, and Gopi finds himself red-handed with another girl in front of Mahi. Then he shows his real face, blames her for his cheating, and breaks up with her. Later, after knowing the facts, Krish makes her confident and tries to understand that love is a game to get control of other partners. He criticizes her for not having self-respect and becomes a scape goat, and no boy cannot be attracted to her with this attitude.

Then Mahi decides to up her game and gets a makeover. She keeps teasing Krish that she is not a scapegoat anymore and can attract any boy in the world. Poking fun at her, Krish challenges her to impress him and prove her point. Then she accepts the challenge and tries to attract him in various comical circumstances. One day at an office party, Mahi boozed for the first time, and after the party, he kissed Krish. After this, Krish realized that he had fallen in love with Mahi and decided to propose to her. But suddenly Mahi's parents come home and misunderstand them, and her mother makes a ruckus. However, Mahi manages the situation and sends him out. Later, Mahi shares her guilt with Krish for cheating on her parents, who believe her and send her to do a job in the city.

Later, Mahi finds Gopi at her home, who comes to get her after observing changes in her. He tries to force her to start a relationship again, then suddenly Krish intervenes, and Gopi starts a brawl with him. Then Mahi stops Krish and takes the side of Gopi; then Krish misunderstands her and leaves her with him. Later, Mahi meets Krish and asks for his help making Gopi with her. He always thinks about her. However, with the help of Krish, Mahi starts her game with Gopi, who finds Krish sad and possessive about her and fears her advanced moves with Gopi. Later, Mahi goes with Gopi to a farm house for a night, which she informs Krish about, which makes him shattered and doubt her character.

The next day at the office, Mahi meets Krish and tries to share her feelings with him, but Krish stops her and yells at her. Then suddenly a surprise visit is given by Jennifer, which shocks Mahi and Krish. To show his anger toward her, he moves close to Jennifer in front of her. This situation makes her doubt his character, but she tries to explain her feelings to him at his home, the possessive Jennifer stops her and sends her back by taking a company file from her. There she finds a letter that was written to Krish by Mahi. Later, Krish finds her resignation in the office and feels sad about losing her.

Then, after a week, Jennifer confronts Krish and tells the truth about Mahi and Gopi at that night. Actually, Mahi decides to teach Gopi a lesson for cheating her; that's why she moved close with him. At that night, Mahi rejects Gopi's advances towards her and warns him of his cheating nature. Then, angered Gopi tries to molest her, but she slaps him and leaves the place. Later, these facts were known by Jennifer through Mahi. Then she makes him realize that whenever proper communication is possible, the relationship will be the best one, and love is not a game; it is a life. Then she drops out of the relationship and encourages Mahi to propose. Meanwhile, Mahi realizes that being with herself is the best quality ever and has decided not to change her character for others.

Now Krish, who got confident enough to confront her, goes to her hometown, where he finds out that her marriage preparations are going on. Meanwhile, Gopi becomes rogue and makes a huge ruckus about her marriage, then Krish comes under her rescue and bashes Gopi and leaves him. Later, he proposes Mahi for the marriage she eventually accepts. Then suddenly Krish's parents revealed themselves to be Mahi's father's childhood friend, and they also accepted their relationship. The film ends with Krish and Mahi unifying with all the parents' acceptance.

== Cast ==
- Varun Sandesh as Krishna Mohan "Krish"
- Poorna as Mahalakshmi "Mahi"
- Sridhar as Gopi
- Dhanraj as Ali
- Sonia Birji as Jennifer
- Uttej as Jithendra "Jeethu"
- Vennela Kishore as Rishi
- Sana as Mahalakshmi's mother
- Raghu Karumanchi as Bridegroom
- Vajja Venkata Giridhar as Jithu

== Soundtrack ==
No.	Title	Singer(s)	Length
1.	"Manase Manasuni Patti"	Ranjith	3:55
2.	"Nee Valle"	Tippu, Kalyani
3.	"Manasulo Maatani"	Sahiti, Sai Karthik, Dinakar
4.	"Nuvvala Nenila"	Sai Karthik
5.	"Ye Zindagi"	Sai Charan, Sri Soumya

== Reception ==
A critic from The Times of India wrote that "Nuvvala Nenila could have easily been a good romantic entertainer, if only there was some great chemistry between the lead actors".
