= Total Dadagiri =

- Theatrical release poster
- Directed by: Pathikrit Basu
- Screenplay by: N. K. Salil
- Story by: Prasanna Kumar Bezawada
- Produced by: Shrikant Mohta; Mahendra Soni
- Starring: Yash Dasgupta; Mimi Chakraborty; Rajatabha Dutta
- Cinematography: Soumik Haldar
- Music by: Jeet Gannguli
- Distributed by: Shree Venkatesh Films
- Release date: 19 January 2018
- Running time: 145 Minutes
- Country: India
- Language: Bengali

Total Dadagiri is an Indian Bengali-language masala film directed by Pathikrit Basu and produced by Mahendra Soni. This film was released on 19 January 2018 in the banner of Shree Venkatesh Films. Yash Dasgupta and Mimi Chakraborty played lead roles in it. Music direction of the film was made by Jeet Gannguli. The film is a remake of the 2017 Telugu film Nenu Local starring Nani and Keerthy Suresh.

== Plot ==
The film follows a teen love story of two college going students Joy and Jonaki. Joy is an engineering student, who failed repeatedly and falls in love at first sight with an MBA student Jonaki. Jonaki's father, is the professor of the college who stands seriously against their love. The couple tries to convince their parents.

== Cast ==
- Yash Dasgupta as Joy
- Mimi Chakraborty as Jonaki
- Rajatabha Dutta as Jonaki's Father
- Shankar Chakraborty as Bibhutibhusan Das, Joy's father
- Pushpita Mukherjee as Ashapurna Das, Joy's mother
- Debaparna Chakraborty as Shreya
- Subhadra Mukherjee as Jonaki's mother
- Rajiv Bose as Sukhiram
- Sourav Chakraborty as Inspector Siddharth Chatterjee
- Pradip Dhar as goon
- Raju Thakkar
- Vashkar Dev

== Soundtrack ==
Total Dadagiri

Soundtrack album by Jeet Gannguli
- Released: 2018
- Recorded: 2017
- Genre: Feature film soundtrack
- Label: SVF
- Producer: Shrikant Mohta; Mahendra Soni

Jeet Gannguli chronology
| Jole Jongole (2018) | Total Dadagiri (2018) | Piya Re (2018) |

Singles from Total Dadagiri
- 1. "Chinte Parli Na" Released: 1 Jan 2018; 2. "Mon" Released: 6 Jan 2018; 3. "Tui Hobi Amar" Released: 14 Jan 2018

All lyrics are written by Prasen (Prasenjit Mukherjee); all music is composed by Jeet Gannguli.

| No. | Title | Singer(s) | Length |
|---|---|---|---|
| 1. | "Chinte Parli Na" | Jeet Gannguli | 04:10 |
| 2. | "Mon" | Jeet Gannguli | 03:13 |
| 3. | "Tui Hobi Amar" | Jeet Gannguli | 03:44 |
| Total length: | | | 11:07 |
