= Asmita Marwa =

Indian fashion designer

- Born: Asmita Gunti; Hyderabad, India
- Occupation: Fashion designer
- Years active: 1994–present
- Spouse: Harvesh Marwah
- Website: asmitadesign.com

Asmita Marwa is an Indian fashion designer. She has been recognized by Vogue as one of the top up-and-coming international designers. Her designs often blend traditional Indian elements, such as Kalamkari, with contemporary global styles.

== Design career ==
Marwa began designing clothes in Hyderabad in the 1990s. She was the first Hyderabad designer to enter the Telugu film industry. Numerous actors, including Nagarjuna, Balakrishna, Preity Zinta, Anjala Zaveri, Shriya, Mahesh Babu, Tabu, Asin, Charmy, and Anushka, have worn her clothes, in films like Manmadhudu, Santhosham, Premante Idera, Arjun, Athadu, Pokiri, and Gharshana.

In December 2003 Marwa launched a fashion label, Asmita Design, sold through her signature store Reves d’Etoile and at "xlnc" in Hyderabad and "Aza Fashions" in Mumbai and Delhi. Heavily believing in sustainable and "slow fashion," Asmita fuses traditional and global aesthetics while using ethical norms and practices. Gaining traction in the fashion world, Asmita has been attending Lakme Fashion Week since 2008, with her collection "Gaia-An Awakening" taking the sustainable fashion world by storm. Asmita has also been attending Fashion Week in Goa since 2011 and made a special appearance at Global Sustainable Fashion Week in Budapest, Hungary. Asmita's collection in Budapst 2016, called Zero Waste, featured a collection made entirely of all the small bits and pieces of fabric that are usually wasted, repurposing to create appliqués, fabric textures and accessories for the Zero Waste Collection.

== Style journalism ==
For many years Marwah wrote a style column in the Hyderabad Times

== Personal life ==
Marwah is married and has a son. She has also participated in the Blenders Pride Fashion tour, the goa beach fashion week and is a member of the fashion council of India.
