= Posani Krishna Murali =

Indian actor, screenwriter, director and producer

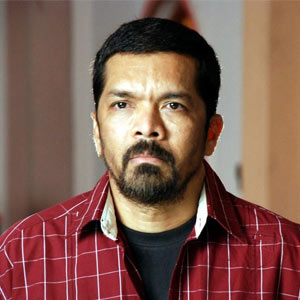
- Posani in 2012
- Born: 22 January 1958 (age 68); Pedakakani, Andhra Pradesh, India
- Occupations: Film director; actor; writer
- Spouse: Kusuma Latha
- Relatives: Koratala Siva (cousin); Boyapati Srinu (cousin)

Posani Krishna Murali (born 22 January 1958) is an Indian screenwriter, actor, director and producer who primarily works in Telugu cinema. He has worked as a writer for over 150 Telugu films and directed a number of films. In 2009, he unsuccessfully contested the Andhra Pradesh state legislative assembly elections from Chilakaluripet constituency. He is briefly arrested for allegedly creating animosity in early 2025. He was later granted bail and accused the Chandrababu Naidu-led government of Andhra Pradesh of filing cases against him as part of a political vendetta.

== Early life and education ==
Posani was born on 22 January 1958 in Pedakakani, Guntur, Andhra Pradesh. His father Posani Subba Rao worked as a small-time employee in Pedakakani and his mother was a housewife. He has an elder sister Rajyalakshmi and a younger sister Prameela. He also has a younger brother Posani Amar Bhosale. He is the cousin of Boyapati Srinu. Growing up, Posani's family struggled financially and his father was not educated and wanted Posani to study well so that he could have a better life. Posani did his schooling in a small village in Guntur district and went on to do his BComm. He joined Acharya Nagarjuna University in Guntur and graduated with an MA degree. During his time in Nagarjuna University, he was elected as the general secretary for the student body. After completing his master's degree, he worked in a small chit fund company in Hyderabad. He was offered a job in Margadarsi Chit Fund. After a year of working there, he resigned his job and went back to Guntur. Posani, saddened and distressed after his father's untimely death, went to Chennai to find work. With no friends in Chennai, Posani met Paruchuri Gopala Krishna at his home and asked him for work. Gopal Krishna gave him an opportunity to work as an assistant under him. Posani later joined Presidency College and graduated with a MPhil degree, which was his second master's degree. He wanted to obtain a PhD degree. Although he joined a college to do so, he later discontinued his studies because of his work.

== Career ==
=== Assistant writer and early work (1992–1998) ===
He joined as an assistant writer under the writing duo Paruchuri Brothers. While he was still working under them and pursuing his MPhil degree in Madras, Ram Gopal Varma asked him to write dialogues for one of his films. Posani declined the offer and told Ram Gopal Varma that he still had a lot to learn from the Paruchuri Brothers and he wasn't ready to take up a film on his own. Posani worked for five years under the Paruchuri Brothers assisting them in over 100 films. In 1992, he finally quit as assistant writer to further his career. He played a small cameo role in the 1992 Telugu film Dharma Kshetram. He landed a job of writing story and dialogues for the film Police Brothers under the direction of Mohan Gandhi. Also Ram Gopal Varma gave him an opportunity to write dialogues for his 1993 film Gaayam. Varma also recommended Posani to Nagarjuna, which led him to write for the film Rakshana. He was also given a breakthrough opportunity to write for Chiranjeevi's Alluda Majaka directed by E. V. V. Satyanarayana. He wrote the story, dialogues and screenplay for the film. He continued working in successful films such as Pavithra Bandham, Thaali, Preminchukundam Raa, Pellichesukundam, Gokulamlo Seetha, Sivayya, Ravanna and Master.

=== Popularity and acting (1999–2004) ===
In 1999, he worked as a writer for eight films, the highest by any Telugu writer in that year. In 2000, he worked as a writer for nine films. In 2001, while still busy as a writer, he began his acting career with Srihari's Evadra Rowdy for which he also wrote the story and screenplay. In 2002, his second film as an actor Gemini starring Venkatesh was released. The same year also saw Posani in Mahesh Babu's Bobby which was directed by Sobhan. Although the film was a failure at the boxoffice, Posani's performance in the film was praised. He continued to appear in films such as Good Boy and Bhadradri Ramudu. He also continued writing for films such as Orey Thammudu, Raghavendra, Simhachalam, Palanati Brahmanaidu, Seetayya, Tiger Harischandra Prasad and Gemeni.

=== Film direction and success (2005–present) ===
After writing for about one hundred and fifty Telugu films, Posani Krishna Murali decided to direct a film. He established the production company called UP Cinema Lines. In 2005, he wrote, directed and produced Sravanamasam starring Krishna, Harikrishna, Suman, Vijaya Nirmala, Bhanupriya, Keerthi Chawla, Kalyani, and Gajala. Although the film had a big star cast and more than sixty character artists which included comedians and artists of Telugu cinema like Brahmanandam, Kota Srinivasa Rao, Krishna Bhagavaan, Tanikella Bharani, Giri Babu, Kondavalasa, Dharmavarapu Subramanyam, Sunil, Venu Madhav, L.B. Sriram, M. S. Narayana, Mallikarjuna Rao, AVS, Ali and Babu Mohan, the film was a failure at the box office and Posani's direction was heavily criticised. Posani also incurred heavy losses financially due to the failure of this film. Post Sravaanamasam, he acted in films such as Athadu, Game and Munna. In 2006, he began working on his next directorial venture. He wrote the script and approached Telugu actor Srikanth to play a lead role in the film. Impressed by the script, Srikanth agreed to do the film and Posani secured a producer for the project. The film was a political satire and was titled Operation Duryodhana and was released in 2007. The film was successful at the box office earning nearly ten times its budget. Posani's direction was also praised by the critics. He continued to direct films such as Apadamokkulavadu, Mental Krishna, Rajavari Chepala Cheruvu, Posani Gentleman and Dushasana, some of which also feature him in the lead role. After his villainous role in Naayak (2013), he was offered many supporting roles in Telugu films.

== Filmography ==
=== As a writer and director ===
Year	Title	Director	Writer	Producer	Notes
1993	Gaayam	No	Dialogues	No	
1993	Rakshana	No	Dialogues	No	
1994	Police Brothers	No	Yes	No	
1995	Alluda Majaka	No	Yes	No	
1995	Khaidi Inspector	No	Story and dialogues	No	
1995	Adavi Dora	No	Story and dialogues	No	
1996	Pavitra Bandham	No	Dialogues	No	
1997	Nenu Premisthunnanu	No	Dialogues	No	
1997	Taali	No	Dialogues	No	
1997	Preminchukundam Raa	No	Dialogues	No	
1997	Gokulamlo Seetha	No	Dialogues	No	
1997	Pelli Chesukundam	No	Dialogues	No	
1997	Master	No	Dialogues	No	
1998	Pelli Kanuka	No	Dialogues	No	
1998	Auto Driver	No	Dialogues	No	
1998	One Man Army	No	Story	No	Kannada film
1998	Aahaa..!	No	Dialogues	No	
1998	Pellaadi Choopista	No	Yes	No	
1998	Snehithulu	No	Dialogues	No	
1998	Abhishekam	No	Dialogues	No	
1999	Prema Kosam	No	Dialogues	No	
1999	Seetharama Raju	No	Dialogues	No	
1999	English Pellam East Godavari Mogudu	No	Yes	No	
1999	Preyasi Rave	No	Dialogues	No	
1999	Sambayya	No	Yes	No	
1999	Bharata Ratna	No	Story and dialogues	No	
2000	Ravanna	No	Story and dialogues	No	
2000	Manoharam	No	Dialogues	No	
2000	Okkadu Chalu	No	Dialogues	No	
2000	Vijayaramaraju	No	Yes	No	
2001	Orey Tammudu	No	Yes	No	
2001	Evadra Rowdy	No	Yes	No	
2001	Bhadrachalam	No	Dialogues	No	
2002	Gemini	No	Dialogues	No	
2003	Idi Maa Ashokgadi Love Story	No	Screenplay	No	
2003	Raghavendra	No	Yes	No	
2003	Palnati Brahmanayudu	No	Yes	No	
2003	Shambhu	No	Dialogues	No	
2003	Simhachalam	No	Dialogues	No	
2003	Seetayya	No	Story and dialogues	No	
2003	Raja Narasimha	No	Story	No	Kannada film
2003	Tiger Harischandra Prasad	No	Yes	No	
2004	Seshadri Naidu	No	Yes	No	
2004	Bhadradri Ramudu	No	Yes	No	
2004	Swamy	No	Story and dialogues	No	
2004	Aaptudu	No	Dialogues	No	
2005	786 Khaidi Premakatha	No	Dialogues	No	
2005	Sravanamasam	Yes	Yes	Yes	
2007	Operation Duryodhana	Yes	Yes	No	
2008	Aapada Mokkulavadu	Yes	Yes	No	
2009	Mental Krishna	Yes	Yes	Yes	
2009	Rajavari Chepala Cheruvu	Yes	Yes	No	
2009	Posani Gentleman	No	Yes	No	
2011	Dushasana	Yes	Yes	No	

=== As an actor ===
Year	Title	Role	Notes
1992	Dharma Kshetram	Citizen	
1996	Pavitra Bandham	Radha's brother in law	
1997	Pelli Chesukundam	Sub-inspector Ramesh	
1998	Suprabhatam		
1999	English Pellam East Godavari Mogudu		
2001	Ayodhya Ramayya		
2001	Evadra Rowdy		
2002	Bobby	Koti	
2002	Gemini	Hand	
2003	Seetayya	Anjanappa	
2004	Seshadri Naidu	Police officer	
2004	Bhadradri Ramudu		
2005	Sravanamasam		
2005	Athadu	Farooq	
2005	Good Boy		
2006	Valliddari Vayasu Padahare	Lawyer	Special appearance
2006	Game	Raghava's ex-boss	
2007	Munna	Kishan	
2008	Friends Colony		
2009	Mental Krishna		
2009	Rajavari Chepala Cheruvu	Inspector Raja	
2009	Ek Niranjan	Minister Narendra Kumar	
2009	Posani Gentleman	Muddu Krishna	
2010	Dasanna		
2010	Vedam	Police Inspector	
2011	Nishshabda Viplavam		
2011	Nitya Pellikoduku		
2011	Vykuntapali	Pharmaceuticals Rao	
2011	O Manjula Katha		
2011	Kireetam		
2011	Varaprasad and Pottiprasad		
2012	420		
2012	Niyanta		
2012	Jollygaa Enjoy Cheddaam		
2012	Miss Chintamani M. A. (C/o Subbigaadu)	Subbigadu	
2012	Gaali Sheenu		
2012	Tingarodu		
2012	Julai	Club Owner	
2012	People's War		
2012	Sudigadu	Himself	
2012	Krishnam Vande Jagadgurum	Tippu Sultan	
2012	Tikka		
2013	Naayak	Shukla Bhai	
2013	Jagadguru Adi Shankara	Maha Mantri	
2013	Potugadu	Venkata Rathnam	
2013	Attarintiki Daredi	Raja Ratnam	
2013	Doosukeltha	Avatar	
2013	Chandee	Gabbar Singh	
2013	Masala	Nagaraju	
2013	Operation Duryodhana 2	Krishna	
2013	Second Hand	Love Doctor	
2013	Bunny n Cherry		
2014	1: Nenokkadine	Gulaab Singh	
2014	Malligadu Marriage Bureau	ACP Nayak	
2014	Bhimavaram Bullodu	Police Officer Posani	
2014	Race Gurram	Home Minister Govardhan	
2014	Prathinidhi	Commissioner	
2014	Kotha Janta		
2014	Manam	Inspector Dharma	
2014	Jump Jilani	Ugra Narasimha Reddy	
2014	Maine Pyar Kiya	Pandu	
2014	Aa Aiduguru	Krishna Murali	
2014	Nee Jathaga Nenundali	Bar owner	
2014	Boochamma Boochodu		
2014	Kiraak	Tantrik	
2014	Bruce Lee: The Fighter	Jayaraj's PA	
2014	Power	Raja	
2014	Aagadu	Super Sampangi	
2014	Loukyam	Guptaji	
2014	Govindudu Andarivadele	Lawyer	
2014	Oka Laila Kosam	Sub-Inspector	
2014	Rowdy Fellow	Silk Babu	
2015	Pataas	Home Minister	
2015	Gopala Gopala	Siddheswar Maharaj	
2015	Intelligent Idiots		
2015	Temper	Narayana Murthy	
2015	Bandipotu	Bhale Babu	
2015	Bham Bolenath	Sethji	
2015	Jil	Narayana	
2015	Dohchay	Manikyam	
2015	Lion	Police Inspector	
2015	Superstar Kidnap		
2015	365 Days		
2015	Krishnamma Kalipindi Iddarini	College Principal	
2015	James Bond		
2015	Cinema Choopistha Mava	Doctor	
2015	Kick 2	Police Commissioner	
2015	Shivam	Shiva's father	
2015	Sher	Dadha's assistant	
2015	Kanche	Elamanda	
2015	Raju Gari Gadhi	Bommali Raja	
2015	Red Alert		
2015	Size Zero	Nijam Niranjan	
2015	Inji Iduppazhagi	Nijam Niranjan	Tamil film
2015	Bengal Tiger	"Celebrity" Shastri	
2015	Loafer	Murali	
2015	Soukhyam	Tirupathi Train Passenger	
2015	Bhale Manchi Roju	Father Paul	
2016	Dictator	Chandrasekhar Dharma's PA	
2016	Run	Posani Balakrishna	
2016	Express Raja	Police	
2016	Soggade Chinni Nayana	Suri	
2016	Speedunnodu	Krishnappa	
2016	Krishnashtami		
2016	Veeri Veeri Gummadi Pandu		
2016	Savitri		
2016	Happy Life		
2016	Sardaar Gabbar Singh	Appaji	
2016	Eedo Rakam Aado Rakam	Inspector M. Koteswara Rao	
2016	Supreme	Musician Shivayya	
2016	Rojulu Marayi		
2016	Brahmotsavam	Village Head	
2016	A Aa	Pallam Narayana	
2016	Sri Sri		
2016	Babu Bangaram	MLA Puchappa	
2016	Aatadukundam Raa	Somaraju	
2016	Chuttalabbai	Varada Raju	
2016	Thikka	Inspector P. Hymanand	
2016	Hyper	Bhanumathi's father	
2016	Eedu Gold Ehe		
2016	Ism	Minister Kotilingalu	
2016	Jayammu Nischayammu Raa	Panthulu	
2016	Dhruva	Chengalarayudu	
2016	Meelo Evaru Koteeswarudu	Tatha Rao	
2017	Khaidi No. 150	Borabanda Bujji	
2017	Luckunnodu	Shaik Nayeem	
2017	Nenu Local	Babu's father	
2017	Lakshmi Bomb	Lakshmi's father	
2017	Babu Baga Busy	Cop	
2017	Rarandoi Veduka Chudham	Rambabu	
2017	Aakatayi	Politician	
2017	Rogue	Seth	
2017	Jayadev	IG M. Krishnamurthy	
2017	Patel S. I. R.	Powder Pandu	
2017	Anando Brahma	Krishna Manohar	
2017	Hello!	Police Officer	
2017	Middle Class Abbayi	Pallavi's father	
2017	Nenu Kidnap Ayyanu		
2017	Nene Raju Nene Mantri	Muniappa	
2017	Jai Lava Kusa	Jai, Lava and Kusa's uncle	
2017	PSV Garuda Vega	Pratap Reddy	
2017	Okkadu Migiladu	Shiva	
2017	Duvvada Jagannadham	Home Minister Pushpam	
2017	Raja The Great	Lucky's uncle	
2018	EGO	Police Inspector Satyanarayan	
2018	Howrah Bridge		
2018	Achari America Yatra	Family Lawyer	
2018	Inttelligent	Yadav	
2018	Juvva	Pydiraju	
2018	Bharat Ane Nenu	Minister	
2018	MLA	CEO	
2018	Nela Ticket	Posani	
2018	Silly Fellows	Prasad	
2018	Enduko Emo	Raju	
2018	Rangu	Ex-MLA	
2018	Naa Peru Surya	Varsha's uncle	
2018	Jamba Lakidi Pamba	previous lawyer	
2018	Saakshyam	Defense Lawyer	
2018	Hello Guru Prema Kosame	Sanju's uncle	
2018	Kavacham	Chintakayala Aavesam	
2019	Yatra	Yadlapati Venkatarao	
2019	Voter	M.L.A.	
2019	Crazy Crazy Feeling	PK	
2019	Chikati Gadilo Chithakotudu	Swami (Priest)	
2019	Burra Katha	Neurosurgeon Prabhudas	
2019	Chitralahari	Narayana	
2019	Arjun Suravaram	Addala Subba Rao	
2019	Majili	Rajendra	
2019	Maharshi	Murali Krishna	
2019	1st Rank Raju	Principal	
2019	Tenali Ramakrishna BA. BL	Judge	
2019	Ninu Veedani Needanu Nene	Police Officer	
2019	90ML	Murali	
2019	Software Sudheer	Chandu's uncle	
2020	Sarileru Neekevvaru	C.I. Narayana	
2020	Aswathama	Police Chief	
2020	Orey Bujjiga	Koteswara Rao	
2021	Red	Lawyer Parthasarathy	
2021	Krack	SP	
2021	Bangaru Bullodu	Boddu Nagaraju	
2021	30 Rojullo Preminchadam Ela	Akshara's father	
2021	Check	Lawyer	
2021	A1 Express	Sundeep's uncle	
2021	Ek Mini Katha	Dr. Surya Prakash	
2021	Crazy Uncles		
2021	Seetimaarr	Sitaram	
2021	Gully Rowdy	Naidu	
2021	Republic	School Principal	
2021	Most Eligible Bachelor	Lawyer	
2021	Pelli SandaD	Kanchukatla Anjaneyulu	
2021	Anubhavinchu Raja		
2022	Super Machi		
2022	Acharya		
2022	Bhala Thandanana	Dayamayam	
2022	Sarkaru Vaari Paata	Colony President	
2022	Shikaaru	C. I. Murali	
2022	The Warriorr	Madhav	Tamil/Telugu bilingual film
2022	Bujji Ila Raa		
2022	Urvasivo Rakshasivo	Broker Murthy	
2022	HIT: The Second Case	News Reporter	
2022	18 Pages	Lawyer Padmanabham	
2022	Malli Modalaindi	Kutumbarao	
2023	Valentine's Night	Velugu Krishnamurthy	
2023	Meter	Commissioner P. Krishna Murari	
2023	Kabzaa		Kannada film
2023	Agent		
2023	Unstoppable		
2023	Bhari Taraganam		
2023	Spy	Secretary Naidu	
2024	Vey Dharuvey	Lawyer	
2024	14	Chief minister	
2024	Aho Vikramaarka		
2024	Gorre Puranam		
2025	Nidurinchu Jahapana	Posani Krishna	
2025	Nenekkaduna		
2025	Jigel		
2025	Solo Boy	Krishnamurthy’s father	
2025	Andhra King Taluka	Minister	
2026	Seetha Payanam		

=== Television ===
Year	Title	Role	Network
2017	Bathuku Jataka Bandi		Zee Telugu
2018	Gangstars	Blockbuster Bala Subramanyam	Amazon Prime Video
2021	In the Name of God	Ayyappa	Aha

== Arrest ==
In 2025, he was arrested by the Andhra Pradesh police on the charges of creating animosity.
