= Hello Guru Prema Kosame =

2018 Indian Telugu-language romantic comedy film

- Theatrical release poster
- Directed by: Trinadha Rao Nakkina
- Written by: Prasanna Kumar Bezawada
- Produced by: Dil Raju
- Starring: Ram Pothineni; Anupama Parameswaran; Pranitha Subhash; Prakash Raj
- Cinematography: Vijay K. Chakravarthy
- Edited by: Karthika Srinivas
- Music by: Devi Sri Prasad
- Release date: 18 October 2018
- Running time: 145 minutes
- Country: India
- Language: Telugu
- Box office: est. ₹35 crore

Hello Guru Prema Kosame (transl. Hello guru, for the sake of love) is a 2018 Indian Telugu-language romantic comedy film directed by Trinadha Rao Nakkina. The film stars Ram Pothineni, Anupama Parameswaran, and Pranitha Subhash, while Prakash Raj, Aamani, Jayaprakash, Sithara, Noel Sean, Sayaji Shinde and Posani Krishna Murali play supporting roles. The film's title is based on the song of the same name from Nirnayam (1991). The film was released on 18 October 2018.

== Plot ==
Sanju is a happy-go-lucky youth in Kakinada whose life revolves around his loving father, mother Gayathri, and friends. Although he is very stubborn initially about staying in his hometown, he eventually decides to move to Hyderabad after learning of his parents' desire for him to land a good IT job. He is asked to stay in the home of Viswanath, Gayatri's friend. On the train to Hyderabad, Sanju meets Anupama, whom he embarrasses and annoys after hearing her badmouth Kakinada boys.

Later, Sanju finds out that Anu is none other than Viswanath's daughter, and he will have to share a home with her and drop her off at college every morning. At first, Anu harbors a deep dislike for Sanju, but later warms up to him due to his kindhearted nature and love for his family. They become good friends. Sanju also learns about Viswanath's reputation for always keeping his word and sacrificing his dream of making Anu a doctor to fulfill a promise he made to a dying friend. Sanju also takes interest in a girl named Reethu, a colleague, and they begin a relationship.

At the same time, Sanju's friendship with Anu strengthens, but when Reethu proposes to Sanju, he finally discovers his hidden love for Anu and realizes that he cares deeply for Anu, and not merely as a friend. Just when he is about to reveal his love to Anu, Viswanath finalizes Anu's engagement to his colleague Karthik, breaking Sanju's heart. Viswanath and Sanju become close friends, and Viswanath gives Sanju his word that he will remain his friend until Sanju leaves Hyderabad. Sanju finally reveals his love for Anu to Viswanath, who is stuck in a dilemma as he needs to keep his word and be a friend to Sanju by helping him gain Anu's love, while protecting Anu and trying to keep her away from Sanju's advances.

After the hilarious and emotional chaos that ensues, Anu finally reveals to Sanju that she too loved him all along and asks him to take her away and marry her. When Viswanath learns about this, he angrily and emotionally tells Sanju to take her away and marry her, as he is fed up with the situation. On Anu's wedding day, Viswanath is shocked to discover that Anu is still at home, while Sanju has left. Sanju reveals that he did this as he did not want to hurt and embarrass Viswanath, as he had to be a good friend to him, and he also realizes that Viswanath knows what is best for his daughter. Soon, Viswanath arrives in Kakinada with Anu and happily gives his blessings for them to get married, as he realizes that Sanju can keep Anu happy for the rest of her life.

== Cast ==
- Ram Pothineni as Sanju
- Anupama Parameswaran as Anupama 'Anu'
- Pranitha Subhash as Reethu
- Prakash Raj as Viswanath, Anu's father
- Aamani as Lakshmi, Anu's mother
- Jayaprakash as Sanju's father
- Sithara as Gayatri, Sanju's mother and Viswanath's friend
- Noel Sean as Karthik, Sanju's friend
- Sayaji Shinde as Karthik's father
- Posani Krishna Murali as Sanju's uncle
- Suresh as Reethu's father
- Raghu Babu as Raghu, Sanju's friend
- Ram Prasad as Sanju's friend
- Satya as Sanju's friend
- Praveen as Mechanic
- Sapthagiri as Auto Driver

== Release and marketing ==
The film was released on 18 October 2018. The film's pre-release business is estimated to be ₹24 crore. The film was also dubbed and released in Hindi on YouTube as Dumdaar Khiladi on 7 July 2019 by Aditya Movies.

== Reception ==
Srivathsan Nadadhur of The Times Of India gave the film a rating of 3.5/5 and wrote "Trinadha Rao Nakkina, the director delivers a clean entertainer that may not surprise you much but gives a good reason to hit theatres for the festival holidays". Suresh Kavirayani of Deccan Chronicle gave the film a rating of 2.5/5 and wrote "Devi Sri Prasad’s music is not up to the mark. Vijay C. Chakravarthy provides good visuals for the film. Some Prakash Raj scenes and the hilarious first half are the highlights". Hemanth Kumar of Firstpost gave the film a rating of 2/5 and wrote "Hello Guru Prema Kosame is also a romantic drama with very little romance".

Murali Krishna CH of The New Indian Express gave the film a rating of 2/5 and wrote "Hello Guru Prema Kosame is a below average film with hardly anything new to offer. Watch it if you are a sucker of these predictable rom-coms". Sangeetha Devi Dundoo of The Hindu stated "Barring a few comic sequences, ‘Hello Guru Prema Kosame’ is a middling film".

== Soundtrack ==
The soundtrack was composed by Devi Sri Prasad.

Hello Guru Prema Kosame

Film score by Devi Sri Prasad
- Released: 28 September 2018
- Genre: Soundtrack
- Length: 19:25
- Label: Aditya Music
- Producer: Devi Sri Prasad

Devi Sri Prasad chronology
Saamy Square (2018)	Hello Guru Prema Kosame (2018)	Vinaya Vidheya Rama (2019)

Telugu Track list
No.	Title	Lyrics	Singers	Length
1.	"My World is Flying"	Srimani	Alphonse Joseph	3:41
2.	"Native Place"	Srimani	Narendra	3:50
3.	"Idea Cheppu Friendu"	Chandrabose	Prakash Raj, Ram Pothineni	4:07
4.	"Peddha Peddha Kallathoti"	Srimani	Yazin Nizar	4:08
5.	"Hello Guru Prema Kosame"	Srimani	Sagar, Ranina Reddy	3:39
Total length:				19:25

Track list (Hindi Dubbed)
No.	Title	Length
1.	"My World is Flying"	3:41
2.	"Native Place"	3:50
3.	"Idea Do Friend"	3:53
4.	"Ishq Vishq Karlo Ji"	2:52
5.	"Chalo Shuru Prem Hum Kare"	2:51
Total length:		17:09
