= Eduruleni Alexander =

- Poster
- Directed by: Rajareddy Panuganti
- Produced by: PLK
- Starring: Taraka Ratna; Komal Jha
- Music by: Dr. Josyabatla Sarma
- Release date: 29 March 2014
- Country: India
- Language: Telugu

Eduru Leni Alexander is a 2014 Indian Telugu-language action romance film directed by Rajareddy Panuganti and starring Taraka Ratna and Komal Jha in the lead roles.

== Plot ==
Sincere police officer Alexander battles the villains Jinnah Bhai and Kottappa. He also deals with land grabbing and prostitution in the city. Alexander is a law unto himself having killed at least 99 people at last count when the police commissioner transfers him from Vizag to Hyderabad.

Komal plays the role of the Alexander's lover, who is impressed by his heroics and pursues him.

== Cast ==
- Taraka Ratna as Alexander
- Komal Jha as Komal
- Ravi Babu as Jinnah
- Jayaprakash Reddy as Kotappa
- Fish Venkat as Kotappa's henchman

== Production ==
Taraka Ratna plays a police officer for the first time in his career in the film.

== Soundtrack ==
The music is composed by Dr. Josyabatla Sarma and is rated as average in reviews.

1. "Alexander" sung by Geetha Madhuri, Vedala Hemachandra
2. "Guleba Kavali" sung by Vedala Hemachandra, Malavika
3. "Vayasu" sung by M. M. Keeravani, Amruta Varshini
4. "Kavvinchina" sung by Chaitra Ambadipudi and Prasobh
5. "Vayasu (version 2)" sung by Usha

== Reception ==
The film is rated 1.5 stars out of 5 by The Times of India movies review. The review comments state - "All through the movie, you have Alexander mouthing dialogues to make him look and sound bigger than he is". The Hans India review states the action and chasing sequences, Taraka Ratna's dialogue delivery and direction make the movie worth watching.
