= Komal Jha =

Indian Movie Actress and Writer

- Born: Ranchi, Bihar, (present-day Jharkhand), India
- Education: B.E – Civil from MSRIT, Bangalore
- Occupations: Actress, civil engineer, writer
- Years active: 2012–present
- Height: 5 ft 7 in (170 cm)
- Relatives: Dr. Bharti Jha (mother), Dr. SN Jha (Father), Dr, Asha Jha (Grandmother), Dr. Bindeshwar Pathak (Founder, Sulabh International)( Maternal Grand Uncle)
- Website: ikomaljha.com

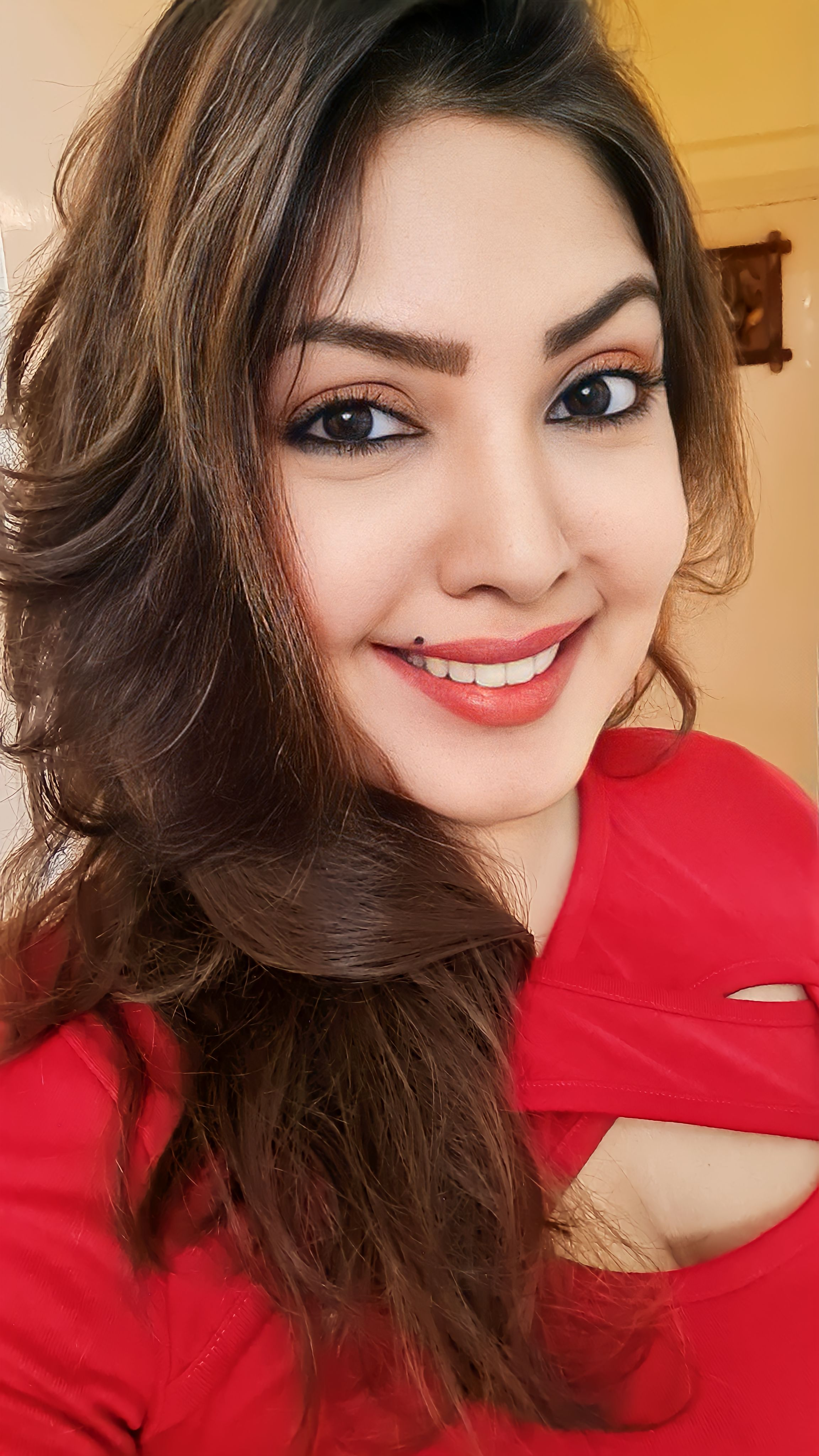
Jha in 2025

Komal Jha is an Indian movie actress and writer. She established a career in Telugu, Kannada, Malayalam and now Hindi film industries. She is known for her career transformation from being a civil engineer to an actress, and for her roles in Chinna Cinema. In addition to acting, she participates in stage shows and endorses several brands, predominantly in South India. Jha made her acting debut with the 2009 Bollywood movie 3 Idiots while attending college and her first Malayalam movie released in 2010, 24 Hrs. In the same year Jha left for Dubai and took a job with an international construction firm located in Dubai, UAE. In 2011, Jha was back to India for Nimbe Huli and Ramachari. Jha was also appearing in television commercials and print ads for some brands such as Axis Bank, BNP Paribas Mutual Funds and Moti Soap during this time.

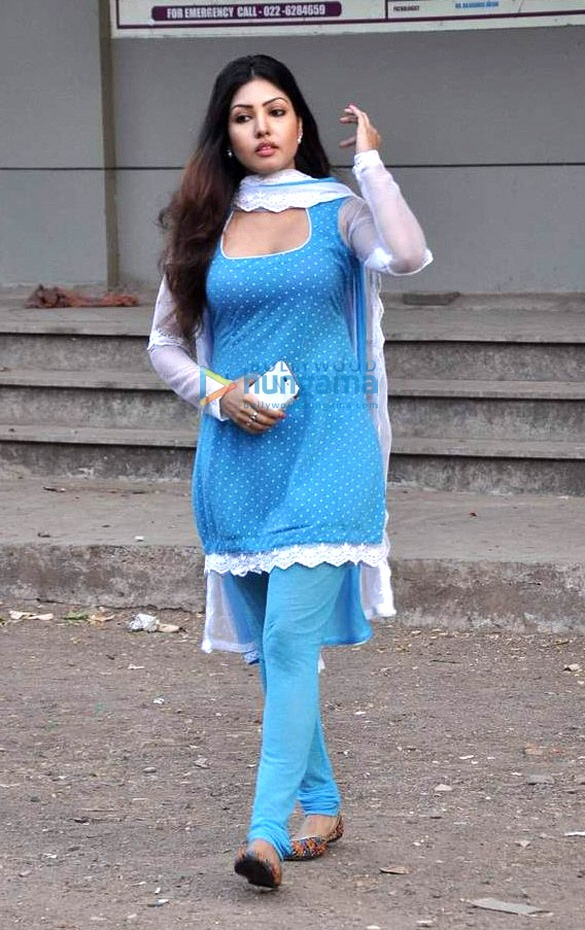
Jha on the sets of Mr.MBA movie

Jha subsequently starred in several films such as Chinna Cinema (2013), Priyathama Neevachata Kushalama (2013) and Eduruleni Alexander (2013). In the year 2014, Jha was seen in Billa Ranga and Maine Pyar Kiya, both in Telugu again. Jha was later cast in a Bollywood movie called Mr. MBA, which will be her debut nationwide in India as a lead in the Hindi film industry, alias Bollywood.

== Career ==
Jha made her acting debut in 2009 with Bollywood the film 3 Idiots, in which she had a minor role of a college student featuring in the song "All Is Well!" She was not an actor by profession then and left for Dubai as she was on campus, placed by a construction company there. After her Malayalam debut Jha did two Telugu films, namely Kalachakram and Parvathi, which did not release and were shelved. Disappointed by the projects getting shelved, Jha left for Dubai and just when she decided to not indulge in this futility, she was offered two movies in two different languages namely, Nimbe Huli and Ramachari in Kannada and Telugu respectively. Jha was not satisfied with both the films' overall success due to the delay in the release dates.

Despite her previous film Nimbe Huli having a delayed release as well as various controversies associated with the same, Jha was offered three movies in the same year, namely Priyathama Neevachata Kushalama, Chinna Cinema, and Eduruleni Alexander. She played diverse characters of a college girl, the younger version of an old woman and the love interest of a police officer respectively. Thus, she suddenly rose to a place where she started getting public appearances and events regularly. However, in the movie Priyathama Neevachata Kushalama, directed by Trinadh Rao Nakkina and starring opposite Varun Sandesh, Jha was removed from the posters owing to not reciprocating the advances by Sandesh. Jha was way too strong and quoted to The Times of India that she will not let anything pull her down.

Jha took a year break from South Indian film industries to focus on her Bollywood debut. She quoted in an interview that "I have done 8 feature films and still did not get the recognition I deserve; it is time to move away to a better place. One Hindi film is equivalent to 10 regional films." Jha took some time off to work on her singing and scope in the music industry.

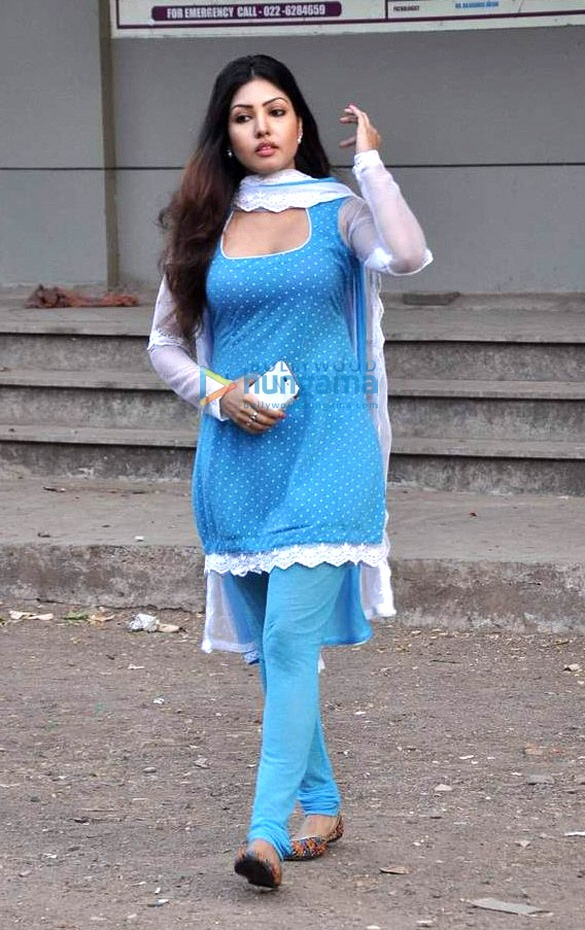
Jha on the sets of Mr.MBA movie

== Activities ==
Apart from acting, Jha writes poetry and publishes poetry on her own website. She has occasionally appeared as a delegate to speak about the current youth issues on some news channels. Jha has worked with the Little Angels Orphanage located in Mumbai to collect funds for them by auctioning her exclusive designer-wear.

== Controversies ==
Some controversies surrounded Jha. The director of Nimbe Huli complained to the Karnataka Film Chamber of Commerce about Jha before release of the film. As it was stated by her in one of her interviews to Times of India, these controversies stopped her from taking up more assignments in Kannada Film Industry. Reportedly she made an allegation stating she wasn't treated professionally during the filming of the movie, to one of her interviewers from The Times of India.

Also, she alleged that the co-actor Varun Sandesh indecently behaved with her during the filming of the movie Priyathama Neevachata Kushalama. She lamented that he removed her from the posters of the movie on not being reciprocated.

There was news that she was romantically linked with the Indian Cricket captain M. S. Dhoni and a well known Indian actor R. Madhavan too. However she has denied to all these rumors during her interviews to multiple news sources.

== Filmography ==
Movies and Music Albums
Year	Film	Role	Language	Notes
2009	3 Idiots	Student	Hindi	
2010	24 Hrs	Gauri	Malayalam	
2012	Nimbehuli	Bhoomika	Kannada	
2013	Priyatama Neevachata Kushalama	Kundana	Telugu	Dubbed to Hindi
2013	Chinna Cinema	Damayanthi/Manjari	Telugu	
2013	Ramachari	Sherlock Homes Song	Telugu	
2014	Eduru Leni Alexander		Telugu	
2014	Billa Ranga	Balamani	Telugu	
2014	Maine Pyar Kiya	Bhargavi	Telugu	
2016	Hottie weds Naughty	Lavanya	Hindi	Formerly named Mr. MBA, Filming completed
2018	Geet Ishq Da (Punjabi Song) Red Lips Song Selfie Song by Gurlez Akhtar		Punjabi	Punjabi Music Album
2019	Sithara Silks Ad		Malayalam	
2022	Monagadu		Telugu	
2024	Welcome Wedding		Hindi	
