= Posani Gentleman =

Indian Telugu-language romantic drama film

- Theatrical release poster
- Directed by: Posani Krishna Murali
- Written by: Posani Krishna Murali
- Produced by: Nallam Padmaja; Nallam Srinivas (presenter)
- Starring: Posani Krishna Murali; Aarthi Agarwal; Natasha
- Cinematography: Anand C Kumar
- Music by: U. Mallik Sharma
- Production company: Veerabhadra Productions
- Release date: 25 December 2009
- Country: India
- Language: Telugu

Posani Gentleman (also known as Gentleman) is a 2009 Indian Telugu-language romantic drama film written and directed by Posani Krishna Murali, who co-stars in the film alongside Aarthi Agarwal and Natasha.

== Cast ==
- Posani Krishna Murali as Muddu Krishna
- Aarthi Agarwal as Neeraja
- Natasha as Louis
- Nagendra Babu
- Kota Srinivasa Rao
- M. S. Narayana
- Surekha Vani
- Shashank Agarwal as Neeraja's father

== Production ==
The film began production under the title of Gentleman and the muhurat took place on 24 July 2009 at Annapurna Studios with Chiranjeevi attending the function as a chief guest. Posani Krishna Murali played the role of a team leader of a software company, Aarthi Agarwal played his wife, and Russian model Natasha plays his colleague and girlfriend. Agarwal's real life father, Shashank Agarwal, portrays her father in the film. Brahmanandam was to play the role of Professor Sankaragiri Manyam but was not featured in the film. The film completed production as of early September 2009 and was in post-production as of later October 2009. According to Posani Krishna Murali, the film delves into the topic of life after marriage and how the love between a husband and wife is not the same after around five years and is the best film of his career due to its message.

== Soundtrack ==
The music was composed by U. Mallik Sharma with lyrics by Chandu, Madhu, Paidisetti Ramu and Rani Pulamoja Devi. The audio launch was held on 3 November 2009 with Srikanth, Sairam Shankar (presenter Nallam Srinivas' classmate) and Kanna Babu attending the event as chief guests.

Track listing
No.	Title	Lyrics	Singer(s)	Length
1.	"Gentleman"	Chandu Madhu	L. V. Revanth, Pradyothan	4:14
2.	"Are Kanti Papalo"	Paidisetti Ramu	Rahul Nambiar	4:24
3.	"Kehadoonga"	Paidisetti Ramu	Ranjith, Geetha Madhuri	4:29
4.	"Come Come Come"	Rani Pulamoja Devi	Naveen, Sagari	4:15
5.	"Eppudu Vasthado"	Chandu Madhu	Geetha Madhuri	4:25
Total length:				21:47
