= Chaurya Paatham =

2025 Indian Telugu-language film by Nikhil Gollamari

- Directed by: Nikhil Gollamari
- Story by: Karthik Gattamneni
- Produced by: Trinadha Rao Nakkina
- Starring: Indhra Ram; Payal Radhakrishna; Rajeev Kanakala; Mast Ali
- Cinematography: Karthik Gattamneni
- Edited by: Uthura Parthasarathy
- Music by: Davzand
- Production company: Nakkina Narratives
- Release date: 25 April 2025
- Running time: 124 minutes.
- Country: India
- Language: Telugu

Chaurya Paatham is a 2025 Indian Telugu-language crime comedy drama film directed by Nikhil Gollamari. The film features debutant Indhra Ram, Payal Radhakrishna, Rajeev Kanakala in lead roles. The film was produced by Trinadha Rao Nakkina under Nakkina Narratives. and editing was done by Uthura Parthasarathy.

The film was released on 25 April 2025.

== Summary ==
A young aspiring filmmaker, desperate to fund his first movie, plans to rob a bank in the village of Dhanapalli with the help of a small gang. However, the heist takes an unexpected turn, leading to a series of unforeseen events that dramatically change his life.

== Cast ==
- Indhra Ram as Vedanth Ram
- Payal Radhakrishna as Anjali
- Madee Manepalli as Lakshman Kotipalli
- Rajeev Kanakala as Zamindar
- Mast Ali as Bablu Kumar
- Anji Valguman as Jack Dan
- Supriya Aysola as Vasudha
- Edward Stevenson as Shivay

== Music ==
All music is composed by Davzand.

No.	Title	Lyrics	Singer(s)	Length
1.	"Okkasariga"	Krishna Kanth	Anurag Kulkarni	3:31
2.	"Aada Pisacham"	Bhaskarabhatla	Anthony Daasan	3:03
3.	"Telisi Telisi"	Kalyanachakravarthy Tripuraneni	Shweta Mohan, Haricharan	3:24
4.	"Kanne Kaane"	Roll Rida, ML Gayatri	Roll Rida, Mangli	3:36
Total length:				13:34

== Release and reception ==
Chaurya Paatham was released on 25 April 2025.

Aditya Devulapally of The Indian Express gave the film 2.5/5 stars and said "Chaurya Paatam is a zany heist comedy that, despite its promising start and quirky charm, is ultimately let down by weak writing in the latter half."

Bhanuprasad Rangaiahgari from News18 Telugu gave the film 2.75/5 stars and stated "Chaurya Paatam is praised for its exceptional cinematography by Karthik Ghattamaneni, its impactful background score, and its high production values."

=== Streaming rights ===
The movie was given the streaming rights to Amazon Prime Video on 27 May 2025 and in Lionsgate Play on 6 June 2025.
