= Mazaka =

2025 Indian Telugu-language film by Trinadha Rao Nakkina

- Theatrical release poster
- Directed by: Trinadha Rao Nakkina
- Screenplay by: Prasanna Kumar Bezawada; Sai Krishna
- Story by: Prasanna Kumar Bezawada
- Produced by: Anil Sunkara; Ramabrahmam Sunkara; Razesh Danda; Balaji Gutta; Umesh KR Bansal
- Starring: Sundeep Kishan; Ritu Varma; Anshu Ambani; Rao Ramesh
- Cinematography: Nizar Shafi
- Edited by: Chota K. Prasad
- Music by: Leon James
- Production companies: AK Entertainments; Hasya Movies; Zee Studios
- Release date: 26 February 2025
- Running time: 149 minutes
- Country: India
- Language: Telugu
- Box office: ₹12.75 crore

Mazaka is a 2025 Indian Telugu-language romantic comedy film directed by Trinadha Rao Nakkina from a story written by Prasanna Kumar Bezawada. It was produced by Anil Sunkara, Ramabrahmam Sunkara, Razesh Danda, Balaji Gutta and Umesh KR Bansal, under AK Entertainments, Hasya Movies and Zee Studios. It features Sundeep Kishan, Ritu Varma, Anshu Ambani, and Rao Ramesh in the lead roles.

The film was extensively shot in Visakhapatnam. It was released on 26 February 2025 to mixed to positive reviews but it was a commercial failure at the box office.

== Plot ==
The story revolves around a father and son duo named Ramana and Krishna. Ramana works in a visa office and Krishna is happy-go-lucky young man who lost his mother during childbirth. Both of them have the same dream: Create a family by means of Krishna's marriage. However, stating that they don't want to send their daughter to family with no woman, Krishna doesn't get a bride.

Enter Meera for whom Krishna falls head over heels and tries to impress her while on the other hand, Ramana himself decides to get a wife to make Krishna's marriage easy and falls in love with Yashoda at first sight.

After some hilarious and emotional aspects, both Krishna and Ramana successfully make their respective lovers fall for them. However, it is revealed that Meera and Yashodha are niece and aunt and now Bhargava Varma is in the picture.

Bhargav Varma is a hilarious yet egoistic CEO of a company and is unfortunately Meera's father and Yashodha's brother.

Now starts a hilarious stunt with Bhargav stating that he will agree to both Ramana's and Krishna's marriage if they succeed in making Meera and Yashodha reconcile, who are enemies due to Yashodha's grip on Meera's life.

Also, Bhargav Varma has a grudge against Krishna and Ramana because they made him miss an auction and now, he wants revenge and has set them up with Meera and Yashodha's fight, thinking both of them will spoil their relationship.

How Krishna and Ramana make Meera and Yashodha reconcile while teaching Bhargav Varma a lesson forms the crux of the remaining story. Meanwhile, the whole story is a flashback told by Krishna and Ramana to a CI in the police station.

== Cast ==
- Sundeep Kishan as Krishna Ramana
- Ritu Varma as Meera
- Rao Ramesh as Venkata Ramana, Krishna’s father
- Anshu Ambani as Yashoda
- Ajay as police Inspector Ajay
- Murali Sharma as Bhargav Varma, Meera’s father and Yashoda’s brother
- Mani Chandana as Bhargav Varma's wife
- Srinivasa Reddy
- Hyper Aadi
- Chammak Chandra
- Supreeth Reddy
- Raghu Babu
- Gagaan Viharri

== Soundtrack ==
All music is composed by Leon James.

Track listing
No.	Title	Lyrics	Singer(s)	Length
1.	"Bachelors Anthem"	Ramajogayya Sastry	Dhanunjay Seepana
2.	"Baby Ma"	Chandrabose	Leon James
3.	"Pagili"	Kasarla Shyam	Mahalingam, Sahithi Chaganti, Prabha
4.	"Sommasilli Pothunnave"	Ramu Rathod, Prasanna Kumar Bezawada	Ramu Rathod
Total length:				12:45

== Release ==
=== Theatrical ===
Mazaka was initially planned to be released in January 2025 during the Sankranti festive season. The release date announced to be 21 February 2025, but was released on 26 February 2025, coinciding with Maha Shivaratri.

=== Home media ===
The post-theatrical digital streaming rights were acquired by ZEE5 and Amazon Prime Video begin streaming from March 28.

== Reception ==
Sakshi Post rated the film 3 out of 5 and is positive of comedy and the lead cast performances. Echoing the same, The Hindu added that weak writing has led the film down. The Times of India too opined the same and wrote "the film is entertaining as long as audiences don’t take the narrative too seriously".

Sashidhar Adivi of Times Now gave a rating of 2.5 out of 5 and wrote that "It works in the first half but falters in the second", while appreciating the performance of Rao Ramesh. Giving the same rating Telugucinema.com stated, "Mazaka is presented as a comedy entertainer with an emotional aspect, but only a few sequences elicit laughter and the rest become gawky". BH Harsh of Cinema Express was critical of film's writing while praising Rao Ramesh's performance.
