= 24 Hrs (film) =

2010 film by Aditya Sam Abraham

- Directed by: Aditya Sam Abraham
- Written by: Aditya Sam Abraham
- Starring: Kuldeep; Manoj K. Jayan; Komal Jha
- Cinematography: Reji V Kumar
- Edited by: Sooraj E. S.
- Music by: Sayyed Hisham
- Distributed by: Cinevision Films
- Release date: 3 September 2010
- Running time: 93 minutes
- Country: India
- Language: Malayalam

24 Hrs is a 2010 Malayalam action thriller film directed by debutant Aditya Sam Abraham. The film stars Komal Jha, Kuldeep, and Manoj K. Jayan. The film is based on a story by the director Aditya Sam Abraham himself. The director roped in acclaimed young composer Rahul Raj for the promo song.

The story is about a man who is mistakenly taken for another man who has killed a Mafia don's brother. The don who vows revenge sets his men after the youngster and demands that he be killed within 24 hours. Unarmed and untrained, the youngster fights frantically for his life, as the clock starts ticking away. Debutante actor Kuldeep was cast in the lead role while Manoj K. Jayan plays the Mafia don. Mumbai based Actress Komal Jha plays the female lead. Shammi Tilkan who plays a cop, and an honest one for a change. Devan, Vinaya Prasad, Anil Murali, Jagathy Sreekumar, Jameel Khan and Irshad play other major roles.

== Plot ==
Jagannath Varma, alias Jagan is a reckless but courageous young lad who makes money in drag races in Cochin city. He often lands in trouble with cops but gets out by using his brains and with the influence of his millionaire brother Vikramaditya Varma. Fed up with his behaviour, Vikramaditya puts him out of the house and tells him that he has no share in the property anymore. Dejected and not knowing what to do, Jagan goes to the bar, where he is attacked by Rocky who has lost the drag race earlier that day and his friends, but Jagan fights them off. Seeing his courage, Jagan is approached by Hazari, who happens to be the younger brother of Cochin underworld don Ikhthar with an offer to join the gang, but Jagan turns it down. As he is leaving the bar, Rocky attacks Jagan again with a dagger which the latter simply dodges, and the knife lands in Hazari's back, killing him. Rohit and his friends flee the scene. Cops are called, but Inspector Ajay surprises Jagan by telling him that he has won Rs.5 lakh for killing the criminal.

News of his brother's murder reaches Ikhthar, and he orders that Jagan be brought to him dead or alive within 24 hours. Thus begins a cat and mouse game. The goons attack Jagan at the police station, and Ajay dies but not before killing one of them. The other is outwitted by Jagan, and he flees in their own car. On the way, he calls up a police control centre and agrees to meet up with cops near the railway station to sort out the matter, not knowing that the controller cop is Ikhthar's informer. While driving, Jagan finds a surprise in the car, a girl by the name of Gauri, who earlier that day snubs him off when he tries to talk with her, hiding in the back seat. She tells him that she is trying to run away from home that night on learning that her parents are trying to get her married next week, when a group of thugs attacked her, and she is hiding from them.

Jagan agrees to leave Gauri at the railway station and move. They stop at a Gas station for gas and rest, only to find the goon whom he had outwitted at the police station with another goon. They try to attack Gauri but Jagan wards them off with a pistol he finds in the car dashboard. Both of them are on the run again. They reach the station, where Jagan leaves a reluctant Gauri, and goes to meet the cops. He is met with a surprise when a goon of Ikhthar arrives and holds him at gunpoint. But there comes Gauri, and both of them flee the scene again with a few gunshots and the goon chasing them. They finally reach a point where Jagan shoots him but not before he tries to set their car on fire, which is fortunately averted.

Jagan and Gauri now argue as to why each of them did not escape and why does each one care for the other. Then Jagan gets a call from one of Ikhthar's goons, David, saying that he has taken his brother and sister-in-law hostage at their own house, and will kill them if Jagan does not come immediately. But lady luck favours Jagan again, and he borrows a racing car from one of his friends, Ranjit, who happens to be passing by that time.

Jagan finally arrives at his house, where he tells Gauri to hide at the back of the house, and is led to Vikramaditya and Leela bound to sofas. tries to kill them, but Gauri breaks in with the pistol. Unfortunately, Gauri and Jagan are overpowered. Now on the advice on one of them by the name of Salim, the gang decides to kill them by placing a time bomb in the house, and take Jagan and Gauri away.

Jagan is taken to Ikhthar's hideout and tortured with electricity. He keeps saying that he did not kill the don's brother, but no one believes him. Finally, Ikhthar orders him to be killed. Unfortunately, the battery goes off, and when the goons return to replace it and torture him again, Jagan breaks free with a knife put in his hand by an unknown person, and knocks everyone out.

At this point, Ikhthar shoots David, believing him to be an informer of the police as told by Salim. Jagan sneaks out through the house and manages to escape. Ikhthar orders all his men to chase him. Jagan escapes them and finally arrives at the bus depot, where he meets none other than Rocky and his friends. Jagan tries to strike a deal with him, saying that he can take the 5 Lakh award for killing the don's brother. But Rocky has a better plan. He says that he will hand Jagan over to the don and then take the reward, thus pleasing both. Ikhthar's people attack, but Rocky is killed by mistake. Finally, Jagan is captured, but the Don calls them and insists that he kill Jagan with his own hands.

The climax opens at the helipad, where Ikhthar arrives in a chopper to meet Jagan surrounded by his men. He gets a rude shock when one of his most trusted men pulls a gun on him, saying that he is Special Task Force Officer Salim Ali, and he was the informer cop. He also says that now there is enough evidence to arrest Ikhthar. But the skilled Ikhthar manages to snatch the magazine from Salim's pistol and fits it in his own and aims it at them. Now he takes Jagan hostage into the helicopter and leaves in the air, from where he pushes him off. But Jagan hangs on, pulls off the fuel tank cover and jumps to the ground. He then lights a cigarette and throws the match on the dropping fuel, which leads to flames that blast the helicopter to pieces.

Toward the end, it is revealed that the bomb at Jagan's house was deactivated by Inspector Salim, so his loved ones were unharmed; he also had taken Gauri to a safe place. Three weeks later, Jagan gets a surprise visitor at home, none other than Gauri with her parents. It appears that the boy whom Gauri's parents wanted her to marry was Jagan, hearing which both of them blush.

== Cast ==
- Kuldeep as Jagan
- Manoj K. Jayan as Ikhthar
- Komal Jha as Gauri
- Jagathy Sreekumar in a special appearance
- Devan as Vikramaditya Varma
- Shammi Thilakan as Inspector Ajay
- Anil Murali as David
- Irshad as Hazari
- Vinaya Prasad as Leela Varma
- Sudhir as Rocky
- Jameel Khan as Salim

== Reception ==
The film was censored and released in limited theatres all over Kerala. While the initial collections were weak due to a lack of publicity, they soon picked up within two to three days. The audience response and word-of-mouth were good. The film expanded to a few more centres in due course. The film also earned rave reviews from internet reviewers.
