= Trinadha Rao Nakkina =

Indian film director

- Born: Visakhapatnam, Andhra Pradesh, India
- Occupations: Film director; Screenwriter
- Years active: 2013–present

Trinadha Rao Nakkina is an Indian film director and screenwriter who works in Telugu cinema. He is known for his films Cinema Choopistha Mava, Nenu Local and Dhamaka.

== Filmography ==
| Year | Title | Notes |
|---|---|---|
| 2012 | Mem Vayasuku Vacham | |
| 2013 | Priyathama Neevachata Kusalama | |
| 2014 | Nuvvala Nenila | |
| 2015 | Cinema Choopistha Mava | |
| 2017 | Nenu Local | |
| 2018 | Hello Guru Prema Kosame | |
| 2022 | Dhamaka | |
| 2025 | Mazaka | |
| TBA | Nenu Ready | |

=== Other roles ===
| Year | Title | Writer | Producer | Actor | Notes |
|---|---|---|---|---|---|
| 2018 | Ayushman Bhava | Yes | No | No | |
| 2019 | Iddari Lokam Okate | No | No | Yes | |
| 2025 | Chaurya Paatham | No | Yes | No | |
| 2026 | Anakapalli | Yes | Yes | Yes | |
