= Sravanamasam =

- Directed by: Posani Krishna Murali
- Written by: Posani Krishna Murali; Marudhuri Raja (dialogues)
- Produced by: Posani Krishna Murali
- Starring: Karthikeya Goud; Gajala; Harikrishna; Krishna; Kalyani
- Cinematography: V. Jayaram
- Edited by: Gowtam Raju
- Music by: Vandemataram Srinivas
- Production company: UP Cinema Lines
- Release date: 26 February 2005
- Country: India
- Language: Telugu

Sravanamasam (transl. Month of Sravana) is a 2005 Indian Telugu-language family drama film written, directed and produced by Posani Krishna Murali. It stars Karthikeya Goud, Gajala, Harikrishna, Krishna and Kalyani. The film released to negative reviews despite high expectations.

== Cast ==
- Karthikeya Goud as Sambasiva Rao
- Gajala as Mahalakshmi
- Harikrishna as Trimurtulu
- Krishna as Krishna Rao
- Kalyani as Kavita Reddy
- Vijaya Nirmala
- Bhanupriya as Rajyam
- Nagababu as Saidulu
- Suman
- Keerthi Chawla
- Jhansi as dhobi
- Suhasini
- Posani Krishna Murali
- Kota Srinivasa Rao
- Tanikella Bharani as purohit
- A.V.S.
- Chalapathi Rao
- Babu Mohan
- Brahmanandam
- Ali
- Mallikarjuna Rao
- Sunil as Kanchu Babu
- Krishna Bhagawan
- M. S. Narayana
- L.B. Sriram
- Dharmavarapu Subramanyam
- Kondavalasa
- Venu Madhav
- Bandla Ganesh
- Gokina Rama Rao
- Giri Babu
- Chandra Mohan
- Mada
- Telangana Shakuntala
- Jayalalita
- Hema
- Sana
- Jyothi
- Siva Parvathy

== Production ==
Writer Posani Krishna Murali made his directorial debut with this film. The film has an extensive cast of sixty artists, most of them appearing in minor roles.

== Soundtrack ==
Music by Vandemataram Srinivas. The audio rights were bagged by Aditya Music.

Track listing
No.	Title	Lyrics	Singer(s)	Length
1.	"Telugu Vari Pelli"	Vengila Rambabu, V. Srinivas	S. P. Balasubrahmanyam · Malavika	5:18
2.	"Syidula"	Raj Kumar	Kousalya	6:47
3.	"Hai Hailesa"	Raj Kumar, V. Srinivas, Aangroth Bheema	Malathi	4:43
4.	"Chinuku Chinuku"	K. V. Mahadevan, Sirivennela Seetharama Sastry	S. P. Balasubrahmanyam · Kousalya	4:50
5.	"Golkonda Kattinodu"	Muni	S. P. Balasubrahmanyam · Kousalya	4:20
6.	"Chilaka Rekka"	Ganesh, Raj Kumar	Usha	4:47
7.	"Nuvvu Eduruga Unte"	Chinni Charan	S. P. Balasubrahmanyam · Kousalya	4:38
Total length:				35:23

== Release and reception ==
The film released on 26 February 2005.

Jeevi of Idlebrain.com rated the film 1.5/5 and opined that "In a nut shell, Sravanamasam is an utterly disappointing film".
