= Anakapalli (film) =

Telugu Film

- Directed by: Khagesh Tammineni
- Produced by: Kandregula Naidu: Thrinadha Rao Nakkina
- Starring: Vikram Sahidev: Sandhya Vasishta; Tarak Ponnappa,
- Cinematography: Maaya V
- Edited by: Srikrishna Attaluri
- Music by: Davzand
- Production company: Bhavya Sri Movie Makers: Nakkina Narratives
- Release date: 2 October 2026
- Country: India
- Language: Telugu

Anakapalli is a 2026 Indian Telugu language drama film directed by Khagesh Tamminen. Produced by Kandregula Naidu and Thrinadha Rao Nakkina, the film stars Vikram Sahidev, Sandhya Vasishta, Tarak Ponnappa and Thrinadha Rao Nakkina. It was released on 2 October 2026

== Cast ==
- Vikram Sahidev
- Sandhya Vasishta
- Tarak Ponnappa
- Thrinadha Rao Nakkina
- Indraja Absar
- Srinivas Vadlamani
- Naidu Kadregula

== Production ==
The film directed by Khagesh Tamminenic ,Story by Thrinadha Rao Nakkina music composed by Davzand and Produced under the banner of Bhavya Sri Movie Makers & Nakkina Narratives

== Reception ==
Hindustan Times wrote "In the end, Anakapalli is a heart-warming love story for those who like a love revenge drama without having high expectations."and have 2.75 ratings

Sakshi News wrote "Technically, the film is decent. The cinematography is good; throughout the movie, it feels as though we have been transported into the atmosphere of Anakapalle"

Asianet News wrote "Despite being somewhat routine, this film is a fresh action love story that is sure to please. It stands out as one of the best releases this week."
