= Rajavari Chepala Cheruvu =

Indian political drama film

- Poster
- Directed by: Posani Krishna Murali
- Written by: Posani Krishna Murali
- Produced by: Subrahmanyam B Rupesh Y
- Starring: Posani Krishna Murali; Gaina
- Cinematography: Gadiraju Srinivas
- Music by: Vandemataram Srinivas
- Production company: Lakshmi Ganapati Films
- Release date: 15 May 2009
- Country: India
- Language: Telugu

Rajavari Chepala Cheruvu (transl. The king's fish pond) is a 2009 Indian political drama film directed by Posani Krishna Murali and starring himself and newcomer Gaina.

== Plot ==
The film follows MLA Raja as he investigates an acid attack case involving the MLA's brother.

== Cast ==
- Posani Krishna Murali as Inspector Raja
- Gaina/Naina as Raja's wife
- Giri Babu as Sivaprasad
- Kota Srinivasa Rao as Kota Srinivasa Rao
- Shakeel Khan as MLA
- Brahmanandam
- Ali
- Raghu Babu
- Brahmaji
- Sunil as News TV Ghajinikanth
- Krishna Bhagavaan
- Venu Madhav
- M. S. Narayana
- Pragathi
- Sana
- Jockey
- ETV Prabhakar
- Ranganath
- Jubaid Khan
- Kondavalasa Lakshmana Rao

== Production ==
The film was rumoured to be produced by the Indian Congress. The film has a scene similar to the nude scene in Pratighatana (1985).

== Reception ==
A critic from The Times of India wrote that "After going overboard in Mental Krishna, Posani comes up with a restrained performance this time". A critic from Full Hyderabad stated that "There are bad films and worse films, but few strive so hard to be truly offensive. If you're ever caught in this one, all we'll say is, flush it and forget it".
