= Anshu Ambani =

Indian actress

Anshu Saggar
- Born: January 31, 1986 (age 40); London, United Kingdom
- Occupations: Actress, Therapist
- Years active: 2002–2004; 2024–present
- Spouse: Sachin Saggar (m. 2011)
- Children: 2

Anshu Saggar (née Ambani) is a British Indian actress known for her work in Telugu cinema during the early 2000s. She gained recognition for her roles in the blockbuster romantic comedy Manmadhudu (2002) alongside Nagarjuna and Raghavendra (2003) with Prabhas. After a hiatus of 21 years, she made her comeback in Mazaka, starring Sundeep Kishan and Rao Ramesh.

== Early and personal life ==
Anshu is from London, United Kingdom, and was born and brought up there. Anshu married Sachin Saggar, who is also from London. They have a daughter and son and spent her years working as a psychologist after her films in earlier years.

== Career ==
Anshu was first recognised by cameraman Kabir Lal, who introduced her to director K. Vijaya Bhaskar, who later cast her in Manmadhudu alongside Nagarjuna. She is well known for the hit song "Gundello Emundho". The actress also appeared in Raghavendra opposite Prabhas and a Tamil film called Jai starring Prashanth in the lead role. After her wedding, she took a break from the film industry.

== Filmography ==
Year	Title	Role	Language	Notes
2002	Manmadhudu	Maheswari	Telugu	Nominated – Filmfare Award for Best Supporting Actress – Telugu
2003	Raghavendra	Sirisha	Telugu	
2003	Missamma	Deepika	Telugu	Guest appearance
2004	Jai	Nandhini	Tamil	
2025	Mazaka	Yashoda	Telugu	
