= Prasanna Kumar Bezawada =

Indian screenwriter and lyricist

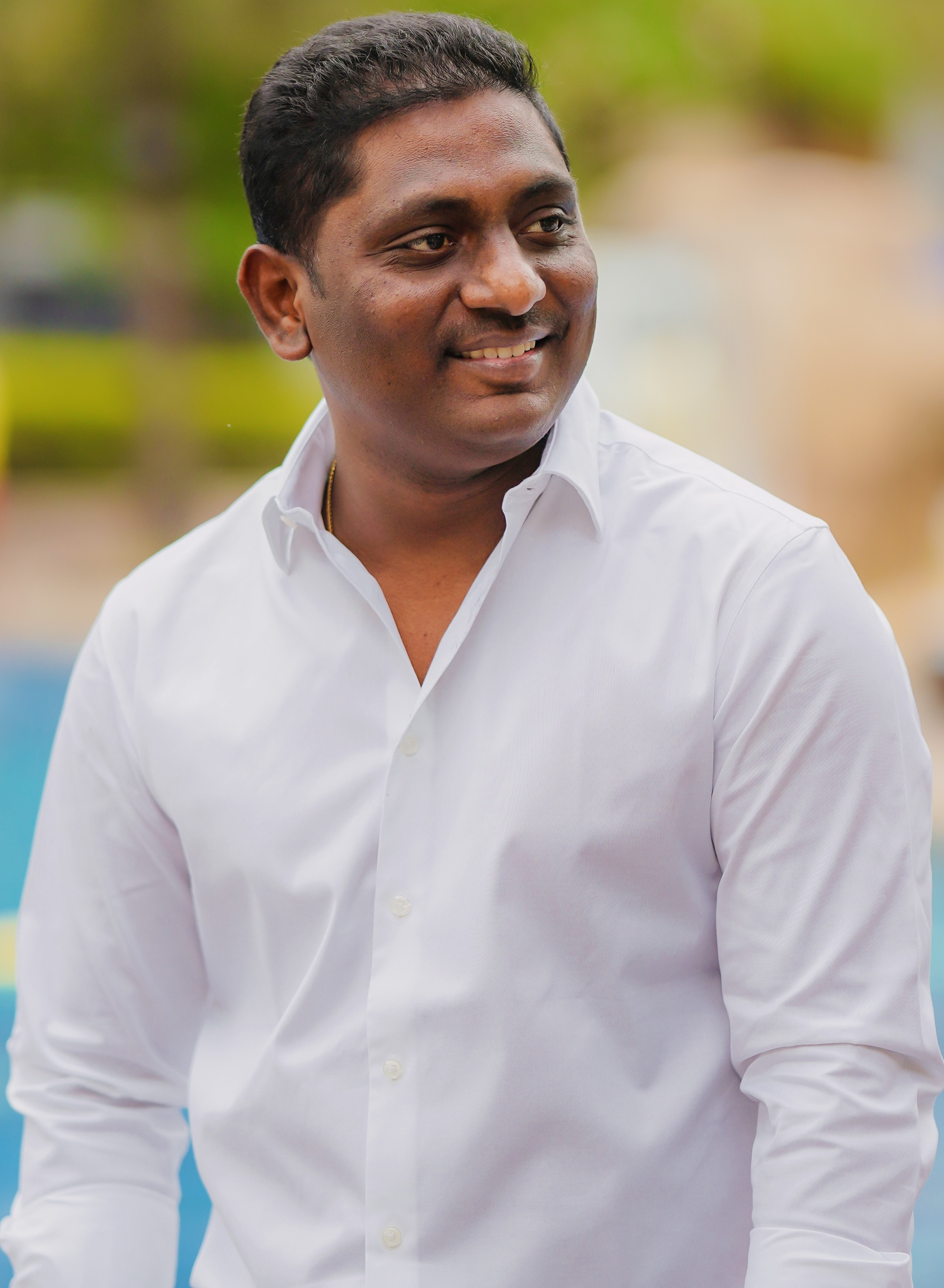
- Occupations: Screenwriter; Lyricist
- Years active: 2008 – present
- Spouse: Mounika (m. 2020)

Prasanna Kumar Bezawada (born 16 June 1985) is an Indian screenwriter and lyricist who works in Telugu films. He is known for writing films like Cinema Choopistha Mava, Naanna Nenu Naa Boyfriends, Nenu Local, Hello Guru Prema Kosame, Dhamaka and Das Ka Dhamki.

== Early life ==
He was married to Mounika on 29 July 2020.

== Filmography ==
Year	Title	Credited as			
Year	Title	Screenplay	Dialogues	Lyricist	Notes
2015	Cinema Choopistha Mava	Yes	Yes	Yes	
2016	Run	No	Yes	No	
2016	Ekkadiki Pothavu Chinnavada	No	No	Yes	
2016	Naanna Nenu Naa Boyfriends	Yes	Yes	No	
2017	Nenu Local	Yes	Yes	No	
2018	Hello Guru Prema Kosame	Yes	Yes	No	
2021	Paagal	No	No	Yes	
2022	Dhamaka	Yes	Yes	No	
2023	Das Ka Dhamki	Yes	Yes	No	
2024	Naa Saami Ranga	Yes	Yes	No	
2025	Mazaka	Yes	Yes	Yes	
