= Chinna Cinema =

https://en.m.wikipedia.org/wiki/Komal_Jha in Chinna Cinema
- Telugu language film poster for Chinna Cinema
- Directed by: Ajay Kambhampati
- Written by: Ajay Kambhampati
- Produced by: Jyothy; Sekhar
- Starring: Komal Jha; Sumona Chandha
- Cinematography: Hyder Bilgrami
- Edited by: Vinjay
- Music by: Praveen Lakkaraju
- Production company: Rainbow Entertainment
- Distributed by: Jersey Plots
- Release date: April 19, 2013 (India)
- Running time: 128 minutes
- Country: India
- Language: Telugu

Chinna Cinema (transl. Small film) is a 2013 Indian Telugu-language romantic comedy film by Ajay Kambhampati as his directorial debut, and starring Komal Jha, Arjun Kalyan and Sumona Chandha with music by Praveen Lakkaraju.

== Plot ==
Ramu (Arjun Kalyan) lands in the USA with the dream of making much money with little effort. He stays with his friends and works at a local Indian grocery store owned by B. Jay (Mahesh Sriram) and operated by B. Jay's brother-in-law S. Jay (Karthik Srinivas). He takes an instant liking towards Janaki (Sumona Chanda) when he sees her the first time. Ramu is motivated to earn and send more money to his father Narayana (Surya) for building a new home. The new home is actually for an orphanage ("Raamaalayam") that is run by an old man, Bapiraju (Dr. M. Balayya). A certain part of the movie has few episodes with a flashback. Komal Jha features as Damayanthi. a Nartaki (dancer) of the 1950s in a village.

== Cast ==
- Arjun Kalyan as Ramudu
- Sumona Chandha as Janaki
- Komal Jha as Damayanthi
- Ravi Varma
- Pradeep Shakti
- L.B. Sriram
- Surya as Narayana
- Dr. M. Balayya as Bapiraju
- Vennela Kishore as Sri
- Prithvi as Daange
- Thagubothu Ramesh
- Ravi Varma as Cowboy Krishna
- Mahesh Sriram as B. Jay
- Karthik Srinivas as S. Jay
- RJ Ghajini as Film director
- Siddhanth
- Raghunadh
- Srini Kolla
- Gautam Raju
- Sudarshanam
- Nagaraju
- Sandhya Janak

== Soundtrack ==
In January 2013, it was announced that Chinna Cinema was "gearing up for audio launch". Music is composed by Praveen Lakkaraju, with various song lyrics by Chakravarthula, SreeJo, Srinivasa Mouli, and K.S.M. Phanindra. Audio launch was February 9, 2013.

1. "USA", performed by Monica & Praveen Lakkaraju
2. "Puthadi Bomma" performed by Suchitra & Sreenivas Josyula
3. "Alai Vachi" performed by Divya Devunhalli & Prasad Thallam
4. "Ramugadu" performed by Sahiti & Praveen Lakkaraju
5. "Hari Lo Ranga Hari" performed by S. P. Balasubrahmanyam
6. "Chinna Cinema" performed by Thagubothu Ramesh & Vennela Kishore

== Reception ==
Times of India panned the film, offering that while filmmaker Ajay Kambhampati "chose an interesting premise - Daanam Chese Vaadiki Swartham Undakudadu (A philanthropist must not have a selfish motto)", he "miserably failed to translate the idea into cinema. In trying to package a commercially entertaining film with an underlying philosophical message, the movie ends up being neither entertaining nor profound." Expanding, they offered that the film "is a predictable fare that has revenge plot - often seen in Telugu films and doesn't offer anything new. The element of surprise is missing from the narration and it meanders aimlessly." They noted that in a revenge-drama "the protagonist's moves to counter goons should be meticulously etched but that was badly missing," and offered that the plot line was illogical, the film's sequences looked uninteresting, and the romance between Ramudu (Arjun Kalyan) and Janaki (Sumona Chanda) was dull and failed to make an impression.

123Telugu offered that the film had a good concept but a bad execution. Pluses included the film's concept "of ‘ selfless donations ‘ and charity without expecting anything in return have been dealt with nicely." Actor Dr. M. Balayya was praised for delivering "a classy and restrained performance". Newcomer Arjun Kalyan was "ok as the male lead", but needs to become relaxed and more comfortable in future roles. Vennela Kishore was entertaining in his role of movie reviewer, and RJ Ghajini was god in his role of an aspiring film director. Comedy scenes in the film's first half were good and "the song ‘Puttadi Bomma’ was shot beautifully." Film deficits include newcomer Sumona Chanda being a poor casting choice for the female lead, as it was felt "she does not have the kind of face that appeals to Telugu viewers." Further, the senior actors led by Goutham Raju were irritating and their comedy scenes seemed poorly written.
