= Priyathama Neevachata Kusalama =

- Directed by: Trinadha Rao Nakkina
- Written by: Uday Bhagavathula
- Produced by: J. Samba Siva Rao
- Starring: Varun Sandesh; Komal Jha; Hasika
- Cinematography: Chitti Babu.K
- Music by: Sai Karthik
- Distributed by: Sudha Cinemas
- Release date: 23 March 2013
- Country: India
- Language: Telugu

Priyathama Neevachata Kusalama (Darling, are you fine there) is a 2013 Indian Telugu-language romantic drama film directed by Trinadha Rao Nakkina, starring Varun Sandesh, Komal Jha, and Hasika. J. Samba Siva Rao produced this film and Sai Karthik provided the music. The film's title is based on the song of the same name from Gunaa (1991). A critic from The Times of India wrote that the film was "badly done with half baked story and the film falls flat".

== Plot ==
The film starts at midnight in Rajamundry. Varun (Varun Sandesh) is waiting for a girl in a bus stop. She calls him and tells him how to elope with her. The police arrest him. He is scolded by her father Rao (Rao Ramesh) a rich man in that area. The girl's whereabouts are unknown.

Two years later Kundana (Komal Jha) has finished her Masters in the US and came her home for a vacation. She meets Varun in his boutique. First she misunderstands him but later falls for him. Unknowingly Kundana befriends Varun's mom (Pragathi) who encourages her to express her feelings.

After several attempts Varun accepts her love and they start dating. Their families accept their love and prepare for marriage. Some days later she gets a post in US. She tells Varun, who tells her to not take the job in the US. They quarrel repeatedly. Kundana decides to call off her engagement, but is interrupted by Rao. He explains his behavior and narrates Varun's flashback.

Then the story jumps before Varun's arrest. Varun is a carefree youth who is always with his useless friends. His strict father (Subhalekha Sudhakar) is afraid for Varun's future and warns him many times, to no avail. Meanwhile, Varun loves Rao's daughter Preethi (Hasika) who is graduating. After several months of attempts he learns that she fell for him on day one, but she played with him. They start dating. They later begin quarreling. Rao fixes a match for her. She decides to elope with Varun.

Then Varun is arrested. After meeting with Varun at the police station, Rao understands Varun's love fr his daughter. One week later Rao apologises to Varun for his actions against him. Rao reveals that his daughter dumped Varun and eloped with one of his friends.

Rao confesses that he is ashamed of his daughter. Varun becomes depressed. Varun's father dies from a stroke. Varun decides to move on and reopens his father's boutique. Varun finds his friend and beats him up. He reveals that he also loves Preethi, but is afraid to tell her. Preethi falls for Varun who decides to break up although he loves her. His friend decides to elope with her. Varun feels betrayed and tries to kill him. Preethi reveals that she is married to him and says that Varun never loved her, because he doesn't provide for her. Preethi compares Varun's love with his friend's and decides to leave Varun and elope. This breaks Varun's heart, but he lets them go.

After completion of his flashback Rao makes them realise the value of true love.

The film ends as Kundana rejects the job and stays with Varun.

== Cast ==
- Varun Sandesh as Varun
- Komal Jha as Kundana
- Hasika as Preethi
- Subhalekha Sudhakar as Varun's father
- Rao Ramesh as Rao
- Ahuti Prasad as Kundana's father
- Pragathi as Varun's mother
- Sana as Kundana's mother
- Sashidhar as Srinu

== Soundtrack ==
All music is composed by Sai Karthik.

Track listing
No.	Title	Singer(s)	Length
1.	"Preeti Preeti"	Vijay Prakash, Monika	3:53
2.	"Yela Yela"	Sahithi, Sai Charan, Anudeep	4:18
3.	"Nuvvala Nenela"	Rahul Nambiar	4:09
4.	"Evoo Evoo"	Haricharan	4:07
5.	"Allari Allaripilla"	Revanth, Deveja Karthik	3:36
Total length:			19:03

== Reception ==
A critic from The Times of India wrote that "On a whole Priyathama Neevachata Kusalama is a badly done film with half baked story and the film falls flat".
