= Raghavendra (film) =

- Directed by: Suresh Krishna
- Written by: Posani Krishna Murali
- Produced by: B. Srinivasa Raju
- Starring: Prabhas; Anshu; Shweta Agarwal
- Cinematography: V. Pratap
- Edited by: Kotagiri Venkateswara Rao
- Music by: Mani Sharma
- Production company: Sree Sree Chitra
- Release date: 28 March 2003
- Country: India
- Language: Telugu
- Box office: ₹2 crore distributors' share

Raghavendra is a 2003 Indian Telugu-language action film directed by Suresh Krishna and written by Posani Krishna Murali. It stars Prabhas, Anshu and Shweta Agarwal. The music was scored by Mani Sharma. The film opened to mixed to negative reviews from critics and audiences and emerged as a commercial failure at the box office, remaining as the lowest grossing film in Prabhas's career. It was eventually dubbed in Hindi as Sanyasi: The Warrior Saint (2008) and Malayalam as Sakthi in spite of being remade by Suresh himself in Hindi as Rocky: The Rebel.

== Plot ==
In the holy town of Mantralayam, Raghava leads a quiet, ascetic life as a devout follower of Sri Raghavendra Swamy. Having taken a vow of renunciation, he maintains strict non-violence and refuses to react to aggression. Mahalakshmi, his spirited relative, falls in love with him, but grows frustrated by his passive demeanour when he fails to respond to provocation from local goons. Viewing his docility as cowardice, she demands an explanation from his parents, prompting Raghava's father reveals the traumatic events that led to his transformation.

Years earlier in Hyderabad, Raghava is a hot-blooded youth who actively fights social injustice through violence. His crusade brings him into conflict with Ankineedu, a ruthless local crime lord. When Raghava persistently disrupts his illegal operations, a vengeful Ankineedu retaliates by murdering Raghava's lover, Sirisha, in front of him. Ankineedu then demands his parents to leave Hyderabad immediately or face death. Desperate to save their son, Raghava's parents extract a solemn vow from him to renounce violence forever. The family relocates to Mantralayam, where Raghava adopts a peaceful lifestyle to appease his parents.

In the present, Ankineedu's henchmen extend their criminal operations into Mantralayam. During an encounter, the goons publicly humiliate and harass Mahalakshmi. The incident shatters Raghava's parents' belief in non-violence. Realizing that his passivity has only emboldened criminals, Raghava's father releases him from his promise, and urges him to fight back.

Fueled by long-suppressed rage and the desire to avenge Shirisha, Raghava abandons his ascetic persona and travels back to Hyderabad. He systematically targets Ankineedu's syndicate, dismantling his operations and defeating his henchmen. In a final confrontation, Raghava kills Ankineedu, eliminating his reign of terror and securing safety for his family and the public.

== Cast ==
- Prabhas as Raghava
- Anshu as Sirisha, Raghava’s love interest
- Shweta Agarwal as Mahalakshmi
- Anandaraj as Ankineedu
- Murali Mohan as Venkat Rao, Raghava's father
- Prabha as Rajamma, Raghava's mother
- Brahmanandam as Chandra Shekhar Azad (MA, M. Phil)
- Rami Reddy as DSP
- Kota Srinivasa Rao as Raghava's uncle
- L. B. Sriram as Colony Secretary
- Bandla Ganesh as Seenu, Raghava's friend
- Mohan Raj as Kanna Rao
- Gundu Hanumantha Rao as Villager
- Vizag Prasad as C.I.
- Raghu Babu as Ankineedu's henchman
- Rama Prabha as Mahalakshmi's grandmother
- Ironleg Sastri as Villager
- Gautam Raju as Villager
- Devi Charan as Ankineedu's henchman
- Simran in item number in "Calcutta Pan Vesina"

== Soundtrack ==
This movie has six songs composed by Mani Sharma. The song "Calcutta Pan Vesina" was reused "Aal Thotta Bhoopathi Nanada" from the Tamil film Youth, composed by Sharma. It was also featured in the 2026 Telugu dubbed version of the movie Youth. The song "Nee Styele" was based on the song "May Madham" from the Tamil film Shahjahan, composed by Sharma.

No.	Title	Lyrics	Singer(s)	Length
1.	"Adugulona Adugu"	Veturi	Mallikarjun, Gopika Poornima	4:47
2.	"Bootulu Tittakuraa"	Vennelakanti	Mano	4:23
3.	"Calcutta Pan Vesina"	Suddala Ashok Teja	Shankar Mahadevan, K. S. Chithra	4:53
4.	"Nammina Naa Madhi"	Veturi	Kalpana Raghavendar, Shreya Ghoshal	5:32
5.	"Nee Styele"	Suddala Ashok Teja	Harish Raghavendra, Sujatha Mohan	5:10
6.	"Sarigamapadanisa"	Veturi	Karthik, Kalpana, Premgi Amaren	4:49

== Reception ==
Jeevi of Idlebrain.com opined that " 'Raghavendra' is definitely worth a look to see Prabhas's performance!" A critic from Full Hyderabad wrote that "Raghavendra is a classic case of taking the Lord's name in vain". Gudipoodi Srihari of The Hindu wrote, "In his second film, Prabhas look more confident and assertive. Yet, he still needs to perfect his diction. Writer Posani Krishnamurali provides enough scope for action sequences, and the six-ft hero makes best use of them". A critic from Sify wrote, "Suresh Krissna is back with a vengeance in his latest directorial venture Raghavendra which is an action packed movie that points out the loopholes in our system. The tall and rugged Prabhas has all the making of a superstar and he carries this otherwise insipid movie on his shoulders".
