= Manmadhudu =

2002 film by K. Vijaya Bhaskar

- Theatrical release poster
- Directed by: K. Vijaya Bhaskar
- Written by: Screenplay: K. Vijaya Bhaskar; Story & Dialogues: Trivikram Srinivas
- Produced by: Nagarjuna Akkineni
- Starring: Nagarjuna Akkineni; Sonali Bendre; Anshu
- Cinematography: Sameer Reddy
- Edited by: A. Sreekar Prasad
- Music by: Devi Sri Prasad
- Production company: Annapurna Studios
- Release date: 20 December 2002 (India)
- Running time: 142 minutes
- Country: India
- Language: Telugu
- Box office: ₹14 crore distributors' share

Manmadhudu (transl. Cupid) is a 2002 Indian Telugu-language romantic comedy film directed by K. Vijaya Bhaskar, who co-wrote the script with Trivikram Srinivas. Produced by Nagarjuna under the Annapurna Studios banner, the film stars Nagarjuna, Sonali Bendre, and Anshu, with music composed by Devi Sri Prasad. The film follows Abhiram, an ad agency manager, whose disdain for women is challenged when he is forced to work with Harika, a spirited assistant manager. Their evolving relationship helps Abhiram confront his past and reconsider his views on love and women.

Filming took place at various locations, including Annapurna Studios, where a corporate agency set was created, and international locations such as Paris and Austria. Manmadhudu was reportedly the first Indian production to shoot inside the Eiffel Tower. Released on 20 December 2002, the film was a commercial success and received the Nandi Award for Best Feature Film.

Manmadhudu received critical acclaim for its script, humour, and music, with its comedic dialogues becoming iconic. Over time, the film has gained a cult following, with its memorable quotes and scenes becoming part of popular culture. Its character-driven comedy has influenced future romantic comedies and enhanced Nagarjuna's persona, making the title "Manmadhudu" closely associated with him. The film was later remade in Kannada as Aishwarya and in Bengali as Priyotoma (both in 2006). A spiritual successor titled Manmadhudu 2 was released in 2019. It was later dubbed in Hindi as Patthar Dil and despite having a Kannada remake, it was dubbed in Kannada as Manmatharu.

== Plot ==
Abhiram is a manager at an advertising agency who harbours a deep disdain for women, which he openly expresses every day. His workplace, however, is filled with women, forcing him to navigate this uncomfortable environment. Prasad, the chairman of the company and Abhiram's paternal uncle, appoints Harika as a new assistant manager. Abhiram resents her presence and begins to bully her, even going as far as bugging her desk to steal her idea for a lipstick advertisement. He belittles her and accuses her of being careless in her work.

Eventually, Harika, fed up with Abhiram's abuse, decides to resign and approaches Prasad to submit her resignation. Prasad, sympathising with her, asks her to reconsider and reveals the reasons behind Abhiram's hatred for women. He explains that Abhiram lost his parents at the age of two and was raised by his grandfather. As the only heir to his family business, Abhiram lived a carefree life until he met Maheswari, the niece of the family's accountant. Abhiram fell in love with her, but Maheswari's uncle, fearing that Abhiram was not serious about her, took her away and arranged her engagement with another man. Abhiram, angered by this, interrupts the engagement ceremony and insists that he intends to marry Maheswari. However, during a car ride with Maheswari, they are involved in an accident, leaving Abhiram unconscious. When he wakes up, his grandfather tells him that Maheswari has gone ahead with the marriage, and Abhiram feels betrayed. This event shapes his belief that all women are superficial and untrustworthy.

After learning about Abhiram's painful past, Harika decides to stay at the company. As a result, Prasad promotes Harika to manager and demotes Abhiram to assistant manager. Although upset, Abhiram is forced to accompany Harika on a business trip to Paris. While working together, Harika helps Abhiram overcome his fear of deep water, and they grow closer. Abhiram begins to develop feelings for Harika, but his emotions are complicated when she reveals that she is engaged to be married.

Upon their return to India, Abhiram becomes withdrawn and childish, unable to cope with his disappointment. Meanwhile, Harika, who reciprocates his feelings, remains uncertain about marriage, as Abhiram has not expressed his emotions toward her. Abhiram's aunt later reveals that Maheswari died in the car accident, and that the family had concealed her death, fearing that Abhiram would be unable to handle the news. Overcome with guilt for hating women, Abhiram is too shocked to confess his feelings to Harika.

On the morning of Harika's wedding, she calls Abhiram to inform him that the marriage is her parents' decision, not hers, and indirectly signals that she is open to being with him if he expresses his feelings. Prasad, noticing the mutual affection between Abhiram and Harika, encourages Abhiram to confess. However, Abhiram insists that it is Harika who should speak first, as his previous attempts at taking the lead in a relationship ended in heartbreak. Harika eventually confesses her feelings over the phone, but due to a network issue, Abhiram is unable to respond. Believing that he has rejected her, Harika decides to go through with the wedding.

Abhiram, determined to stop the wedding, rushes to the wedding venue but finds that Harika and her party are already far off on a boat. In a moment of courage, he jumps into the river and swims toward the boat. Harika, seeing Abhiram in the water, jumps in to join him. Overjoyed, she breaks off her engagement and marries Abhiram.

In a mid-credits scene, during their first night together, Harika recalls realising their connection when Abhiram's lipstick ad concept matched hers. Abhiram admits he had placed a bug under her desk to steal her idea. Harika playfully scolds him and gives him a lighthearted punch.

== Cast ==
- Nagarjuna as Abhiram "Abhi"
- Sonali Bendre as Harika (voice dubbed by Sunitha)
- Anshu as Maheswari
- Chandra Mohan as Mohan Rao, Maheswari's uncle
- Tanikella Bharani as A. Jagadish Prasad, Abhiram's father
- Sudha as Lakshmi, Abhiram's mother
- Brahmanandam as Suribabu Lavangam
- Dharmavarapu Subramanyam as Balasubrahmanyam
- Sunil as Bunk Seenu
- M. Balaiah as Abhiram's grandfather
- Ranganath as Harika's father
- Tanish as Harika's younger brother
- Jaya Prakash Reddy as Seenu's father
- Melkote as Sundaram
- Ananth Babu as Subba Rao
- Rekha as Siva's wife (cameo) in the song "Don't Marry"
- Keerthi Chawla as Malligadu's wife (cameo) in the song "Don't Marry"
- Swapna Madhuri as Swapna
- Anitha Chowdary as TV anchor
- Siva Parvathi
- Swetha
- Sumalatha
- Deepika
- Devisri
- Kausha Rach as an item number
- Ruthika

== Production ==
=== Development ===
After the success of Nuvvu Naaku Nachav (2001), actor and producer Nagarjuna offered director K. Vijaya Bhaskar and writer Trivikram Srinivas the opportunity to work on a new film, which resulted in the making of Manmadhudu. The film was conceived with Nagarjuna in mind for the lead role. Vijaya Bhaskar and Trivikram worked together to craft a fresh narrative that would highlight Nagarjuna's romantic persona while introducing a unique character trait: a protagonist who dislikes women. This premise formed the core of the film's story.

The story is set in an advertising agency, an unexplored backdrop in Telugu cinema that adds humour and character interaction without delving deeply into industry specifics. The hero's disdain for women is explained through a subplot, providing context for his behaviour. To create an engaging dynamic, the hero's workplace is populated by female employees, leading to comedic situations and conflicts. The female lead is portrayed as a strong character who frequently challenges the hero. She starts as an assistant manager and is later promoted to a higher position than the hero, establishing a "tit-for-tat" relationship between them.

The plot further developed as the story shifted abroad, where the hero and heroine, working in the same agency, were given opportunities to spend time together. This setting allowed for the gradual development of romantic feelings, despite their initial animosity. The hero's attitude toward women evolves in phases, with the narrative maintaining a smooth flow to ensure the changes feel natural to the audience. The climax of the film is intentionally simple, avoiding typical action sequences. The story concludes with the resolution of the protagonists' feelings for each other. A post-climax scene introduces the "mike experiment" subplot, offering closure to the narrative. The filmmakers chose not to extend the film with unnecessary scenes, such as the introduction of the heroine's fiancé, keeping the focus on the main characters and their love story. The story primarily focuses on romance and comedy, with only two key scenes highlighting Nagarjuna's mass appeal.

The storyline of Manmadhudu bears resemblance to Yaddanapudi Sulochana Rani's novel Girija Kalyanam, which was also adapted into a film of the same name in 1981. In both, the protagonist becomes misogynistic after the death of his lover. Some scenes were inspired by the 2000 American film What Women Want.

=== Filming ===
A set resembling a corporate advertising agency was built on the first floor of Annapurna Studios by Srinivasa Raju. The set featured enlarged advertisements from magazines, backlit to enhance their appearance. A large vinyl poster of Birla Mandir and Hussain Sagar was placed opposite the agency's building to simulate its location near Birla Mandir. The building's entrance featured an A-shaped glass door, symbolizing the letter "A" from the character name Abhi.

Filming also took place in Austria, Paris, and the Godavari districts in India. In Paris, the crew faced difficulties obtaining permission to film on the Eiffel Tower due to heightened security after the September 11 attacks. Initially, the team was permitted to shoot only in front of the tower. However, with significant effort from Nagarjuna, the necessary permissions were secured, reportedly making Manmadhudu the first Indian film to shoot inside the Eiffel Tower.

The climax was filmed in Narasapuram, where Nagarjuna performed a stunt by jumping into a river without a stunt double. Before the jump, he ensured the safety of the location with a local expert and was informed about the water's depth. Known for his love of swimming, Nagarjuna chose to do the stunt himself. During the shot, he briefly stayed underwater to create dramatic tension, which concerned the crew. The local expert, worried about his safety, jumped in after him. As a result, the scene had to be cut shorter than originally planned.

The songs "Naa Manasune" and "Gundello Emundo" were filmed in Austria. The song "Don't Marry Be Happy" was the last to be filmed during the final schedule. Shankar choreographed the flashback song "Nenu Nenuga Lene," while Raja Sekhar worked on "Don't Marry" and "Andamaina Bhamalu." Raju Sundaram choreographed the "Naa Manasune" and "Gundello Emundo." The final song, "Chelia Chelia," was directed by K. Vijaya Bhaskar, with Krishna Reddy handling the dance sequences.

The costumes for Nagarjuna were designed by Asmita Marwa, and Sonali Bendre's outfits were styled by Manish Malhotra.

== Soundtrack ==
Manmadhudu

Soundtrack album by Devi Sri Prasad
- Released: 2002
- Recorded: 2002
- Genre: Soundtrack
- Length: 27:04
- Label: Sohan Music
- Producer: Devi Sri Prasad

Devi Sri Prasad chronology
Thotti Gang (2002)	Manmadhudu (2002)	Inidhu Inidhu Kadhal Inidhu (2002)

The music for the film was composed by Devi Sri Prasad. The soundtrack was released under the Sohan Audio label.

Five out of six songs had lyrics by Sirivennela Sitarama Sastri. Sitarama Sastry introduced an experimental structure with the song "Don't Marry". Unlike traditional compositions, the song features a pallavi and a narrative (katha) instead of conventional charanams. The narrative portion lacks a fixed metre, making it a unique addition to the soundtrack.

The soundtrack was released on 6 December 2002. The audio launch event was held at an open dais outside the Glass House at Annapurna Studios. The function was attended by 450 winners of a contest conducted by Gemini TV. The event was anchored by singer Sunitha.

A critic from Telugu Cinema described Devi Sri Prasad's music as "average-to-good tunes with proper orchestration," highlighting the interludes with classical instruments.

No.	Title	Lyrics	Singer(s)	Length
1.	"Don't Marry"	Sirivennela Sitarama Sastry	S. P. Balasubrahmanyam	5:41
2.	"Gundello Emundho"	Sirivennela Sitarama Sastry	Venu, Sumangali	4:40
3.	"Nenu Nenuga Lene"	Sirivennela Sitarama Sastry	S. P. B. Charan	3:56
4.	"Na Manasune"	Sirivennela Sitarama Sastry	S. P. Balasubrahmanyam, Chitra	4:09
5.	"Cheliya Cheliya"	Sirivennela Sitarama Sastry	Shaan	4:16
6.	"Andhamaina Bhamalu"	Bhuvanachandra	Devi Sri Prasad	4:20
Total length:				27:04

== Release ==
The film was released with 90 prints. Nagarjuna in an interview with Baradwaj Rangan in 2019 revealed that it was an above average grosser.

The film had a re-release in 4K on 29 August 2023 on the eve of Nagarjuna's birthday.

== Reception ==
Jeevi of Idlebrain.com rated the film 4.5 out of 5 stating, "Nagarjuna dominated the show and won accolades from audiences. It's a must recommended hilarious film for all Telugu film lovers."

Sify gave an extremely positive review and wrote, "Though the story is wafer thin, the director has been able to package the film well with an innovative presentation. The film is out to wallop some fun ‘n’ frolic." It gave a verdict that it is a "Rip-Roaring Entertainer".

Kiran Nadella of Fullhyd.com rated the film 7.5 out of 10 stating, "All things considered, if you can stomach the thirty minutes of echoing flashback, Manmathudu makes for one intense and rousing entertainment, and if you're on its quirky wavelength, it might just strike you as one of the funniest movies you've ever seen!"

Telugu Cinema wrote, "Vijayabhaskar strengthens the weak storyline with his taking aided by Trivikram’s pen-power and Devisri Prasad’s music. A movie that can be a good pastime, and can be worth a watch, or even more for fans of Nagarjuna".

== Legacy ==
Manmadhudu’s blend of satire, quirky characters, and memorable dialogues has kept it relevant over the years. Its witty "counters" became iconic and continue to be frequently referenced in memes and discussions within the Telugu film community.

The film introduced memorable moments, such as the escalator scene and Nagarjuna's interactions with his co-stars, which remain popular in popular culture. The title "Manmadhudu" became closely associated with Nagarjuna, while Trivikram Srinivas further solidified his position as a prominent writer in Tollywood with this film.

== Other versions ==
The film was later remade in Kannada as Aishwarya (2006), which marked the debut of Deepika Padukone, and also remade in Bengali as Priyotoma (2006).

A spiritual successor to the film, titled Manmadhudu 2, also starring Nagarjuna, was released in 2019.

== Awards ==
Nandi Awards

- Best Feature Film – Swarna (Gold) (as producer)

Filmfare Awards

- Filmfare Award for Best Comedian – Telugu – Brahmanandam
