= Nenu Local =

2017 Indian film by Trinadha Rao Nakkina

- Theatrical release poster
- Directed by: Trinadha Rao Nakkina
- Screenplay by: Prasanna Kumar Bezawada; Trinadha Rao Nakkina
- Story by: Prasanna Kumar Bezawada
- Produced by: Dil Raju; Shirish
- Starring: Nani; Keerthy Suresh; Naveen Chandra
- Cinematography: Nizar Shafi
- Edited by: Prawin Pudi
- Music by: Devi Sri Prasad
- Production company: Sri Venkateswara Creations
- Distributed by: Sri Venkateswara Creations
- Release date: 3 February 2017
- Running time: 143 minutes
- Country: India
- Language: Telugu
- Box office: est. ₹60 crore

Nenu Local (transl. I'm Local) is a 2017 Indian Telugu-language romantic action comedy film directed by Trinadha Rao Nakkina, written by Prasanna Kumar Bezawada, and produced by Dil Raju under Sri Venkateswara Creations. The film stars Nani, Keerthy Suresh and Naveen Chandra, alongside Sachin Khedekar, Tulasi, Posani Krishna Murali, Easwari Rao and Rao Ramesh. The music was composed by Devi Sri Prasad, while cinematography and editing were handled by Nizar Shafi and Prawin Pudi.

Nenu Local was released on 3 February 2017 to mixed reviews from critics and became major commercially successful at the box office. The film was remade in Bengali as Total Dadagiri and in Odia as Local Toka Love Choka.

== Plot ==
Babu, a college graduate with a carefree attitude, makes an exam supervisor help him pass the exam. After completing his exam, Babu falls for his classmate Keerthy and pursues her to accept his love. Keerthy soon falls for Babu after he helps her friend Paddu reunite with her fiancée. However, Babu's happiness is short-lived when he learns that Keerthy is engaged to SI Siddharth "Siddhu" Varma.

Siddhu had fallen in love with Keerthy and met her father, who told Siddhu to achieve something in life. After getting posted as SI. Keerthy's father agrees to the proposal. Keerthy tells Babu to make her father accept him as his son-in-law, but trouble ensues as it is revealed that Keerthy's father is the same exam supervisor, who rejects Babu due to his carefree nature. Keerthy helps Babu to apply for a job, but Babu refuses, leading Keerthy to breakup with Babu.

On the day of the wedding, The bride's father arrives and demands to call his son-in-law. Siddhu and Babu arrive and the bride's father aims a shotgun at Babu to kill him. In front of his impending death, Babu convinces the bride's father that his daughter could never be happy after her marriage because his daughter's fiancée loved Paddu. Keerthy's father criticize Babu's speech and taunts to shoot himself.

Babu shoots himself with the bride's father's shotgun and gets severely injured where he is rushed to the hospital. Keerthy's father is convinced and accepts Babu and Keerthy's relationship. Few months later, Babu and Keerthy completes their graduation and get married. Babu participates in local elections and gets elected as the corporator with huge majority of his constituency, while Siddhu asks his father to find out if his would-be doesn't have a boyfriend like Babu.

== Cast ==
- Nani as Babu
- Keerthy Suresh as Keerthy
- Naveen Chandra as SI Siddharth Varma
- Sachin Khedekar as Murthy, Keerthy's father
- Tulasi as Siri, Keerthy's mother
- Rao Ramesh as Bride's father
- Posani Krishna Murali as Babu's father
- Easwari Rao as Babu's mother
- Raghu Babu as Siddharth's father
- Vennela Kishore as Store Salesman
- Prabhas Sreenu as Nimmakayala Raghu
- Krishna Bhagavaan as Constable
- Anish Kuruvilla as College Principal
- Rajitha as Siddharth's mother
- Ram Prasad as Babu's friend
- Viva Raghav as Babu's friend
- Jabardast Rocket Raghava as salesman
- Karate Kalyani
- Sushant Singh Rajput (photo appearance)

== Soundtrack ==
Nenu Local

Soundtrack album by Devi Sri Prasad
- Released: 14 January 2017
- Recorded: 2016
- Genre: Film soundtrack
- Length: 17:21
- Language: Telugu
- Producer: Devi Sri Prasad

Devi Sri Prasad chronology
Khaidi No. 150 (2017)	Nenu Local (2017)	Rarandoi Veduka Chudham (2017)

Devi Sri Prasad scored the soundtrack, which was released on 14 January 2017 on Aditya Music.

Track listing
No.	Title	Lyrics	Singer(s)	Length
1.	"Next Enti"	Chandrabose	Sagar	3:46
2.	"Arere Yekadda"	Sri Mani	Naresh Iyer, Manisha Eerabathini	3:57
3.	"Disturb Chestha Ninnu"	Sri Mani	Prudhvi Chandra	3:04
4.	"Champesaave Nannu"	Sri Mani	Kapil, Sameera Bharadwaj	3:20
5.	"Side Please"	Sri Mani	Javed Ali	3:14
Total length:				17:21

== Reception ==
=== Critical response ===
123telugu wrote "Nenu Local is a likable love story, which is aimed at the youth and mass audience. Today’s younger generation will surely connect to Nani’s character and performance which is the biggest highlight of the film." Srividya Palarpathi of The Times of India wrote "Nenu Local is incredibly predictable. If not for Nani’s comedy timing and skill to keep audiences glued to the seats, the movie would have had nothing much to offer." Idlebrain wrote "Plus points are Nani, entertainment and dialogues. On a whole, Nenu Local provides entertainment despite being routine."

=== Box office ===
The film grossed ₹24 crore at the worldwide box office in its opening weekend. By the end of its run, it was declared a blockbuster, becoming Nani's biggest solo commercial success to date, beating his previous record set by Bhale Bhale Magadivoy. The movie subsequently became Nani's third film to gross $1 million in the US after Eega and Bhale Bhale Magadivoy.

The film was dubbed and released in Tamil as Naan Local and in Hindi as Super Khiladi 4 in 2018.
