= Cinema Choopistha Mava =

- Theatrical release poster
- Directed by: Trinadha Rao Nakkina
- Written by: Trinadha Rao Nakkina
- Produced by: G. Sunitha; Bekkam Venugopal; Rupesh D Gohil
- Starring: Raj Tarun; Avika Gor; Rao Ramesh
- Cinematography: Sai Sriram
- Edited by: Karthika Srinivas
- Music by: Shekar Chandra
- Production companies: Aryath Cine Entertainments; Lucky Media; RDG Productions
- Release date: 14 August 2015 (India)
- Running time: 143 minutes
- Country: India
- Language: Telugu

Cinema Choopistha Mava (transl. I'll show you a movie, uncle (Note: When speaking Telugu, young people often change certain "m" sounds to "v/w"; thus, "maama" (uncle) becomes "maava/maawa" in their lingo.)) is a 2015 Telugu-language romantic comedy film written and directed by Trinadha Rao Nakkina. The film stars Raj Tarun, Avika Gor, and Rao Ramesh. The title of the film is based on a song from Race Gurram (2014). The film was commercially successful at box office. This film marks the second collaboration of Raj Tarun and Avika Gor after the success of their first film Uyyala Jammpala (2013). A Hindi-language remake was released in 2023 as Bad Boy.

== Cast ==
- Raj Tarun as Kaththi
- Avika Gor as Parineeta Chatterjee
- Rao Ramesh as Somnath Chatterjee, Parineeta's father
- Brahmanandam as Daya
- Saptagiri as Rakhi Pandaga
- Praveen as Rahul
- Satya as Bus conductor
- Ram Prasad as Kaththi's friend
- Lakshmi
- Abhay Bethiganti as Kaththi's friend
- Shankar Melkote as College Principal
- Posani Krishna Murali as Doctor
- Krishna Bhagawan as Parineeta's relative
- Chelaki Chanti as Parineeta's relative
- Thagubothu Ramesh in an appearance in the song "Mama O"
- Satyam Rajesh as passenger in Kaththi's auto
- Sudigali Sudheer as College student
- Seenu as College student
- Mehaboob Basha as Rowdy on bus

== Soundtrack ==
Music composed by shekar chandra.

No.	Title	Singer(s)	Length
1.	Untitled	Dhinkar	3.24
2.	"Pilli Kalla Papa"	Shekar Chandra	3.27
3.	"E Velalona"	Lipsika, Anudeep Dev	3.35
4.	"Cheppulona Raayi Chevilona Joreega"	Simha	3.01
5.	"Vellake"	Lucky Raj	2.42
6.	"Tholi Tholi"	Ramya Behara	3.43

== Release ==
The Hindu wrote that "In the initial portions, the film shows a supposedly comic sequence in which students enact a skit that’s a mix of Ramayana and Mahabharata with a new message. It’s just a glimpse of how frustrating the film can get. And it gets worse by and by".
