= List of Telugu films of 2017 =

This is a list of films released in 2017.

== Box office ==
The top films release in 2017 by worldwide box office gross revenue in Indian rupees are as follows:

Highest-grossing films of 2017
Rank	Title	Production company	Worldwide gross	Ref.
1	Baahubali 2: The Conclusion	Arka Media Works	₹1,810.60 crore (equivalent to US$300 million in 2023)	
2	Khaidi No. 150	Konidela Production Company	₹164 crore (equivalent to ₹230 crore or US$24 million in 2023)	
3	DJ: Duvvada Jagannadham	Sri Venkateswara Creations	₹150 crore (equivalent to ₹210 crore or US$22 million in 2023)	
4	Jai Lava Kusa	N. T. R. Arts	₹130.9 crore (equivalent to ₹184 crore or US$19 million in 2023)	
5	Katamarayudu	Northstar entertainments	₹97.5 crore (equivalent to ₹137 crore or US$14 million in 2023)	
6	Spyder	Reliance Entertainment	₹93 crore (equivalent to ₹130 crore or US$14 million in 2023)	
7	Fidaa	Sri Venkateswara Creations	₹90 crore (equivalent to ₹126 crore or US$13 million in 2023)	
8	Gautamiputra Satakarni	First Frame Entertainments	₹78.60 crore (equivalent to ₹110 crore or US$11 million in 2023)	
9	Middle Class Abbayi	Sri Venkateswara Creations	₹70 crore (equivalent to ₹98 crore or US$10 million in 2023)	
10	Ghazi	PVP Cinema Matinee Entertainment	₹62 crore (equivalent to ₹87 crore or US$9.0 million in 2023)	

== January–June ==
Opening		Title	Director	Cast	Production house	Ref
J A N	6	Evaro Tanevaro	S. Babji	Naveen Gautham, Sarayu, Chalapathi Rao, Priyanka	Bashiramma Productions	
J A N	6	Inkenti Nuvve Cheppu	Siva Sri	Prashanth Bodetti, Manikanta Sunny, Pujitha, Suman	Wellfare Creations	
J A N	6	No.1 Hero Rajendar Love Stori	Rajendar	Rajendar, Sri Devi	Sri Rajendar Productions	
J A N	6	Padamati Sandhyaragam London Lo	Vamshi Muniganti	Mirabel Stuart, Chaitu Shantharam, Shahela Rani	Ganesh Creations	
J A N	6	Ye Rojaithey Chusaano	G. Bala	Manoj Nandam, Suma, Smithika Acharya, Monika Singh	AAR Yes Creations	
J A N	11	Khaidi No. 150	V.V. Vinayak	Chiranjeevi, Kajal Aggarwal, Tarun Arora	Konidela Production Company; Lyca Productions	
J A N	12	Gautamiputra Satakarni	Krish	Nandamuri Balakrishna, Shriya Saran, Hema Malini	First Frame Entertainments	
J A N	14	Head Constable Venkataramaiah	Chadalavada Srinivasa Rao	R. Narayana Murthy, Jayasudha	Sri Tirumala Tirupati Venkateswara Films	
J A N	14	Shatamanam Bhavati	Satish Vegesna	Sharwanand, Anupama Parameswaran, Prakash Raj, Jayasudha	Sri Venkateswara Creations	
J A N	26	Luckunnodu	Raj Kiran	Manchu Vishnu, Hansika Motwani	MVV Cinema	
F E B	3	Nenu Local	Trinadha Rao Nakkina	Nani, Keerthy Suresh, Naveen Chandra, Sachin Khedekar	Sri Venkateswara Creations	
F E B	10	Ika..Se..Love	Dungroth Nagaraj	Sai Ravi, Deepthi	Greensun Innovatives	
F E B	10	Om Namo Venkatesaya	K. Raghavendra Rao	Nagarjuna Akkineni, Anushka Shetty, Jagapathi Babu, Saurabh Raj Jain	AMR Sai Krupa Entertainments	
F E B	17	Ghazi	Sankalp Reddy	Daggubati Rana, Taapsee Pannu, Kay Kay Menon, Atul Kulkarni	PVP Cinema	
F E B	17	Vajralu Kavala Nayana	Radha Krishna	Anil Buragani, Nikitha Bhist, Kasi Sivakumar	Sri Pada Entertainments	
F E B	24	C/o Godavari	Raja Rammohan	Deepu Naidu, Rohit Sirigiri, Shruthi Varma, Posani Krishna Murali, Prabhas Sreenu, Suman	F Films Factory + Productions / Bommana Productions	
F E B	24	Winner	Gopichand Malineni	Sai Dharam Tej, Rakul Preet Singh, Jagapati Babu	Sri Lakshmi Narasimha Productions	
M A R	3	Dwaraka	Srinivas Ravindra	Vijay Deverakonda, Pooja Jhaveri, Prakash Raj, Prudhviraj, Murali Sharma	Super Good Films	
M A R	3	Gunturodu	S. K. Satya	Manchu Manoj, Pragya Jaiswal, Rajendra Prasad, Sampath Raj, Kota Srinivasa Rao	Claps & Whistles Entertainments	
M A R	3	Kittu Unnadu Jagratha	Vamsi Krishna	Raj Tarun, Anu Emmanuel, Arbaaz Khan	AK Entertainments	
M A R	10	Aakatayi	Rom Bhimana	Aashish Raj, Rukshar Mir, Suman, Pradeep Rawat, Posani Krishna Murali, Brahmanandam	VKA Films	
M A R	10	Chitrangada	G. Ashok	Anjali, Sakshi Gulati, Saptagiri, Raja Ravindra	Sri Vignesh Karthik Cinema	
M A R	10	Lakshmi Bomb	Karthikeya Gopalakrishna	Lakshmi Manchu, Prabhakar, Posani Krishna Murali, Hema, Bharath Reddy	Udhbav Productions	
M A R	17	Happy Birthday	Pallela Veerareddy	Chennamaneni Sridhar, Jyoti Sethi, Sanjjanaa, Sravan Raghavendra	Sri Nandan Movies	
M A R	17	Maa Abbayi	Kumar Vatti	Sree Vishnu, Chitra Shukla	Vennela Creations	
M A R	17	Nenorakam	Sudharshan Salendra	Sai Ram Shankar, Reshmi Menon, R. Sarath Kumar	Vibha Entertainments	
M A R	17	Pichiga Nachav	V. Sesibhushan	Sanjeev, Chetana Uttej, Nandu, Karunya	Sri Vatsa Creations	
M A R	24	Katamarayudu	Kishore Kumar Pardasani	Pawan Kalyan, Shruti Hassan, Tarun Arora	North Star Entertainment	
M A R	24	Kannayya	Vipul	Vipul, Harshita Singh Panwar	Poppins Entertainment	
M A R	24	Nuvvu Evaro Nenu Evaro	Bhaskar	Suman Shetty, Meghana Rai	Devikrishna Cinema	
M A R	31	Cine Mahal - Rojuki 4 Aatalu	Laxman Varma	Syed Sohel, Thejaswini, Siddhansh, Jeeva	Kalanilaya Creations	
M A R	31	Guru	Sudha Kongara Prasad	Daggubati Venkatesh, Ritika Singh	YNOT Studios	
M A R	31	Rogue	Puri Jagannadh	Ishaan, Mannara Chopra, Angela Krislinzki, Thakur Anoop Singh, Posani Krishna Murali, Ajaz Khan	Tanvi Films	
A P R	7	Aranyamlo	Sudarshan Reddy Palvai	Rohit, Shalu, Charan Naidu	One Man Creations	
A P R	7	Chinni Chinni Asalu Nalo Regene	Santhosh Nelanti	Keerthi Manu, Sonia Deepti, Pavan, Thagubothu Ramesh	P. R. Movie Makers	
A P R	7	Kathrina Kareena Madyalo Kamalhaasan	Ratna Korepally	Mamatha Rahuth, Sasanka Mouli, Chithram Sreenu		
A P R	7	Lakshmi Devi Samarpinchu Nede Chudandi	Jakee Atheek	Naresh, Aamani, Akhil, Charan, Kiran, Sonu, Poonam, Srikoti, Naga Babu	Colors & Claps Entertainment	
A P R	7	Nuvvu Nenu Osey Orey	Ravichandra Kannikanti	Arjun Mahi, Ashwini, Prudhviraj	Sree movie makers Pvt. Ltd	
A P R	7	Saranam Gacchami	Premaraj Enumula	Naveen Sanjay, Tanishq Tiwari, Posani Krishna Murali	Bommaku Creations	
A P R	14	Mister	Srinu Vaitla	Varun Tej, Lavanya Tripathi, Hebah Patel	Sri Lakshmi Narasimha Productions	
A P R	21	Dhada Puttistha	Harish. E	Vinni Viyan, Neha Deshpande, Harini, Aanya	Shakthi Cinema	
A P R	21	Iddari Madhya 18	Nani Acharya	Ram Karthik, Bhanu Tripatri	SRP Visuals	
A P R	21	Lanka	Sri Muni	Raasi, Sai Ronak, Ena Saha, Shiju, Supreeth, Leena Siddhu, Satyam Rajesh, Satha, Sudarshan	Rolling Rocks Entertainment	
A P R	21	Lover Boy	Sanjeev Naidu	Sanjeev Naidu, Sonia Chowdhary	Vega Entertainment	
A P R	28	Baahubali: The Conclusion	S. S. Rajamouli	Prabhas, Anushka Shetty, Ramya Krishna, Rana Daggubati, Tamannaah, Sathyaraj	Arka Media Works	
M A Y	5	Babu Baga Busy	Naveen Medaram	Srinivas Avasarala, Tejaswi Madivada, Mishti Chakraborty, Sreemukhi	Abhishek Pictures	
M A Y	12	Radha	Chandra Mohan	Sharwanand, Lavanya Tripathi, Aksha Pardasany	Sri Venkateswara Cine Chitra	
M A Y	12	Rakshaka Bhatudu	Vamsi Krishna Akella	Richa Panai, Brahmaji, Brahmanandam, Prabhakar	Sukhibhava Movies	
M A Y	12	Venkatapuram	Venu Madikanti	Rahul Haridas, Mahima Makwana, Ajay	Good Cinema Group	
M A Y	19	Keshava	Sudheer Varma	Nikhil Siddharth, Ritu Varma, Isha Koppikar, Rao Ramesh	Abhishek Pictures	
M A Y	19	Mixture Potlam	Sathish Kumar M. V.	Shweta Basu Prasad, Jayanth, Geethanjali Thasya, Posani Krishna Murali, Bhanuchander	Godavari Cine Tone	
M A Y	19	Tik Tak	Haranath Policherla	Haranath Policherla, Mounika, Nishi Gandha	Policherla Production	
M A Y	26	Gopyam	Ballem Venu Madhav	Tharun Sharma, Indu Priya, Annapoorna	Tarun Creations	
M A Y	26	Neelimalai	Suryakiran Eladi	Anand Krishna, Vrushali Gosavi, Ali, Satya Prakash	Neelima Productions	
M A Y	26	O Pilla Nee Valla	Kishore	Krishna Chaitanya, Rajesh Rathod, Monica Singh	Big Wig Movie Entertainments	
M A Y	26	Rarandoi Veduka Chudham	Kalyan Krishna Kurasala	Naga Chaitanya, Rakul Preet Singh, Jagapathi Babu, Sampath Raj, Irshad, Vennela Kishore	Annapurna Studios	
M A Y	26	Sriramudinta Srikrishnudanta	Naresh Penta	Sekhar Varma, Deepthi Shetty, Madhusudhanan Rao, Madhumani Nidu	Gayatri Productions	
J U N	2	Andhhagadu	Veligonda Srinivas	Raj Tarun, Hebah Patel, Rajendra Prasad, Ashish Vidyarthi, Sayaji Shinde	AK Entertainments	
J U N	2	Fashion Designer s/o Ladies Tailor	Vamsy	Sumanth Ashwin, Anisha Ambrose, Manali Rathod, Manasa Himavarsha	Madhura Entertainment	
J U N	2	Neelampati Ammoru	Thota Krishnamurthy	Sai Kiran, Suman, Sri Latha	Navya Movie Makers	
J U N	9	Ami Thumi	Mohan Krishna Indraganti	Srinivas Avasarala, Eesha Rebba, Adivi Sesh, Tanikella Bharani, Vennela Kishore	A Green Tree Productions	
J U N	16	Kaadhali	Pattabhi R. Chilukuri	Pooja K. Doshi, Sai Ronak, Harish Kalyan, Mohan Raman	Anaganagana Film Company	
J U N	16	Pelliki Mundu Prema Katha	Madhu Gopu	Chethan Cheenu, Sunaina, Thagubothu Ramesh	Ganapathi Entertainments & Patnam Productions	
J U N	16	Raja Meeru Keka	Krishna Kishore	Taraka Ratna, Revanth, Noel Sean, Lasya	RK Studios	
J U N	23	Duvvada Jagannadham	Harish Shankar	Allu Arjun, Pooja Hegde	Sri Venkateswara Creations	
J U N	30	Jayadev	Jayanth C. Paranjee	Ganta Ravi, Malvika Raaj, Vinod Kumar Alva, Posani Krishna Murali, Vennela Kishore	Sri Lakshmi Venkateswara Art Creations	
J U N	30	Khayyum Bhai	Bharath	Katta Rambabu, Taraka Ratna, Priya Harshitha	Sri Sai Ooha Creations	

== July–December ==
Opening		Title	Director	Cast	Production House	Ref
J U L	7	Ninnu Kori	Shiva Nirvana	Nani, Niveda Thomas, Aadhi Pinisetty, Tanikella Bharani, Murali Sharma, Rajashree, Neetu Chandra	DVV Entertainments	
J U L	7	Rakshasi	Panna Royal	Abhimanyu Singh, Poorna, Panna Royal, Baby Dhanvi, Thagubothu Ramesh	Dreamcatchers Entertainment	
J U L	8	Rendu Rellu Aaru	Nandu	Anil Mallela, Mahima, Aishwarya Gorak, Naresh	Day Dream Productions; Varahi Chalana Chitram	
J U L	14	Dr. Chakravarthy	Shekkhar Suri	Richard Rishi, Sonia Mann, Lena	Street Play Entertainments	
J U L	14	Patel S. I. R.	Vasu Parimi	Jagapati Babu, Padmapriya Janakiraman, Tanya Hope, Subbaraju, Posani Krishna Murali, Raghu Babu	Varahi Chalana Chitram	
J U L	14	Shamanthakamani	Sriram Adittya	Nara Rohit, Sudheer Babu, Sundeep Kishan, Aadi Saikumar, Rajendra Prasad	Bhavya Creations	
J U L	21	Fidaa	Sekhar Kammula	Varun Tej, Sai Pallavi, Satyam Rajesh	Sri Venkateswara Creations	
J U L	21	Kala Varam Aaye	Sampath V. Kumar	Vibheesh, Priyanka Jawalkar, Chandra Mohan, Sanjeev	Shrinidhi Pictures	
J U L	21	Maya Mall	Govind Lalam	Dilip Kumar, Eesha Rebba, Deeksha Panth, Thagubothu Ramesh	VMM Vishnavi Movie Makers and Greeshma Arts	
J U L	21	Vaisakham	Jaya. B	Harish, Avantika Mishra, Balireddy Pruthviraj	RJ Cinemas	
J U L	28	Goutham Nanda	Sampath Nandi	Gopichand, Hansika Motwani, Catherine Tresa, Sachin Khedekar, Mukesh Rishi, Nikitin Dheer, Ajay	Sri Balaji Cine Media	
J U L	28	Naku Nene Thopu Turumu	Sivamani Reddy	Ashok Sunkara, Manasa Chalapathi Rao, Suman Shetty	Dhruva Creations	
A U G	4	Darsakudu	Jakka Hari Prasad	Ashok Bandreddi, Eesha Rebba, Poojitha Ponnada	Sukumar Writings; B T R N Creations; Playback Pictures	
A U G	4	Green Card	Rums	Shatrughna Rayapati, Stephany, Chalapathi Rao		
A U G	4	Idem Deyyam	V. Ravi Varma	Racha Ravi, Kirak RP, Rachana Smith, Ruchi	Chinmayananda Films	
A U G	4	Nakshatram	Krishna Vamsi	Sundeep Kishan, Sai Dharam Tej, Regina Cassandra, Pragya Jaiswal, Prakash Raj, Tanish	Sri Chakra Media; Butta Bomma Creations; Win Win Win Creations	
A U G	4	Vasham	Srikanth Challa	Nanda Kishore, Vasudev Rao, Swethaa Varma	Shuka Entertainments	
A U G	11	LIE	Hanu Raghavapudi	Nithiin, Arjun Sarja, Megha Akash, Ravi Kishan, Nassar	14 Reels Entertainment	
A U G	11	Jaya Janaki Nayaka	Boyapati Srinu	Bellamkonda Sreenivas, Rakul Preet Singh, Jagapathi Babu, Pragya Jaiswal	Dwaraka Creations	
A U G	11	Nene Raju Nene Mantri	Teja	Rana Daggubati, Kajal Aggarwal, Catherine Tresa, Navdeep, Ashutosh Rana, Pradeep Rawat	Suresh Productions; Blue Planet Entertainments	
A U G	18	Anando Brahma	Mahi V Raghav	Taapsee Pannu, Srinivasa Reddy, Vennela Kishore, Thagubothu Ramesh, Shakalaka Shankar	70mm Entertainments	
A U G	18	Prathi Kshanam	G. M. K. Reddy	Maneesh, Tejaswini Prakash, Veda Sastry	Bhagya Lakshmi Movie Makers	
A U G	18	Preminche Panilo Vunna	Pradeep Manchala	Raghuram Dronavajjala, Bindu Barbie	Sri Sathya Surya Movies	
A U G	25	Arjun Reddy	Sandeep Reddy Vanga	Vijay Deverakonda, Shalini Pandey, Kanchana, Rahul Ramakrishna	Bhadrakali Pictures	
A U G	25	VIP 2	Soundarya Rajinikanth	Dhanush, Kajol, Amala Paul	V Creations	
A U G	28	Nee Preme Naa Pranam	Rajasekhar	Lucky, Sireesha, Vizag Dhanaraj,	SC Productions	
S E P	1	Paisa Vasool	Puri Jagannadh	Nandamuri Balakrishna, Shriya Saran, Vikramjeet Virk, Musskan Sethi	Bhavya Creations	
S E P	1	Shalini	Sheraz	Amogh Deshapathi, Archana Chowdapur, Lucky Ekari	Swarna Productions	
S E P	2	Vellipomakey	Ali Mohammed	Vishwak Sen, Supraja, Swetha	Sri Venkateswara Creations; Sai Akhilesh Productions	
S E P	8	Meda Meeda Abbayi	G. Prajith	Allari Naresh, Nikhila Vimal, Srinivas Avasarala, Satyam Rajesh	Janhavi Productions	
S E P	8	Yuddham Sharanam	Krishna Marimuthu	Naga Chaitanya, Lavanya Tripathi, Srikanth, Rao Ramesh	Varahi Chalana Chitram	
S E P	15	Kathalo Rajakumari	Mahesh Surapaneni	Nara Rohit, Naga Shourya, Namitha Pramod, Srinivas Avasarala	Aarohi Cinema; Aran Media Works; Srihaas Entertainments; Sudhakar Impex (India) Pvt Ltd.	
S E P	15	Srivalli	V. Vijayendra Prasad	Rajath Krishna, Neha Hinge, Rajeev Kanakala, Araham Khan, Sufi Syed, Hema	Reshma Arts	
S E P	15	Ungarala Rambabu	Kranthi Madhav	Sunil, Miya, Prakash Raj, Vennela Kishore, Posani Krishna Murali, Ali, Rajeev Kanakala, Raja Ravindra	United Movies	
S E P	15	Veedevadu	Tatineni Satya	Sachiin J. Joshi, Esha Gupta, Prabhu, Kishore, Srinivasa Reddy	Viiking Media and Entertainment	
S E P	21	Jai Lava Kusa	K. S. Ravindra	N. T. Rama Rao Jr., Raashi Khanna, Niveda Thomas, Ronit Roy, Nanditha Raj, Hamsa Nandini, Posani Krishna Murali, Sai Kumar, Pradeep Rawat, Nassar, Abhimanyu Singh, Harish Uthaman	N. T. R. Arts	
S E P	27	Spyder	AR Murugadoss	Mahesh Babu, Rakul Preet Singh, S. J. Surya, Bharath, RJ Balaji, Shaji Chen, Priyadarshi Pullikonda, Sayaji Shinde, Nagineedu, Jayaprakash, Dheepa Ramanujam, Ajay Rathnam, Hareesh Peradi, Ravi, Sendrayan	NVR Cinema; Reliance Entertainment	
S E P	29	Mahanubhavudu	Maruthi	Sharwanand, Mehreen Pirzada, Vennela Kishore, Nassar, Raghu Babu, Kalyani Natarajan	UV Creations	
O C T	6	Lavanya With Love Boys	Vaddepalli Krishna	Paavani, Parameshwar Hivrale	Rajyalakshmi Art Creations	
O C T	6	Bava Maradallu	Gangarapu Lakshman Murthy	Mohan Krishna	Manikyam Movies	
O C T	6	Nenu Kidnap Ayyanu	Sreekara Babu	Posani Krishna Murali, Brahmanandam, Krishna Bhagawan, Srikanth, Dheeru, Soumithri, Aditi Singh	Madhuram Movie Kreations	
O C T	6	Oye Ninne	Satyam Challakoti	Bharath Margani, Srushti Dange, Thagubothu Ramesh, Thulasi Shivamani	SVK Cinema	
O C T	13	Gulf	P. Sunil Kumar Reddy	Chethan Maddineni, Dimple, Tanikella Bharani, Posani Krishna Murali		
O C T	13	Raju Gari Gadhi 2	Ohmkar	Nagarjuna, Samantha Ruth Prabhu, Seerat Kapoor, Abhinaya, Rao Ramesh, Vennela Kishore, Ashwin Babu, Praveen	PVP Cinema; OAK Entertainments Pvt. Ltd; Matinee Entertainments	
O C T	13	Yours Lovingly	Jogi Raju Mamidi	Prudhvi Potluri, Soumya Reddy		
O C T	18	Raja the Great	Anil Ravipudi	Ravi Teja, Mehreen Pirzada, Radhika, Vivan Bhatena, Prakash Raj, Rajendra Prasad, Sampath Raj, Sai Kumar	Sri Venkateswara Creations	
O C T	27	Anaganaga Oka Durga	Prakash Pulijala	Priyanka Naidu, Kranthi Kumar, Jabardasth Srinu, Sanjay Krishna	S.S. Art Productions	
O C T	27	Dyavudaa	Dasari Sairam	Bhanu Prasad, Sharath Chandra, Jai, Anusha, Karunya	Amrutha Sai Arts	
O C T	27	Vunnadhi Okate Zindagi	Kishore Tirumala	Ram Pothineni, Lavanya Tripathi, Anupama Parameswaran, Anisha Ambrose, Sree Vishnu, Kireeti Damaraju, Priyadarshi Pullikonda, Anand	Sri Sravanthi Movies & PR Movies	
N O V	3	Angel	Bahubali Palani	Naga Anvesh, Hebah Patel, Suman, Kabir Duhan Singh, Saptagiri, Pradeep Rawat, Shayaji Shinde	Saraswathi Films	
N O V	3	Next Nuvve	Prabhakar Podakandla	Aadi, Vaibhavi Shandilya, Rashmi Gautam, Srinivas Avasarala, Brahmaji	V4 Films	
N O V	3	PSV Garuda Vega	Praveen Sattaru	Rajasekhar, Adith Arun, Kishore, Pooja Kumar, Shraddha Das	Jyo Star Enterprises	
N O V	10	C/o Surya	Suseenthiran	Sundeep Kishan, Mehreen Pirzada, Harish Uthaman, Vikranth	Lakshmi Narasimha Entertainments	
N O V	10	Okkadu Migiladu	Ajay Andrews	Manchu Manoj, Anisha Ambrose, Suhasini Maniratnam, Milind Gunaji, Posani Krishna Murali	Padmaja Films Pvt. Ltd.	
N O V	17	Dare	K. Krishna Prasad	Naviin, Pallavi, Sakshi		
N O V	17	London Babulu	Chinni Krishna	Rakshith, Swati Reddy, Murali Sharma, Satya, Dhanraj	Maruthi Talkies	
N O V	17	Lovers Club	Dhruv Shekar	Anish Chandra, Aryan, Pavani, Poorni, Ajay Ratnam	99 Reels Media	
N O V	17	Prema Entha Madhuram Priyuralu Antha Katinam	Goverdhan Gajjala	Chandrakanth Datta, Radhika Mehrotra, Pallavi Dora, Thulasi Shivamani, Tanikella Bharani	Third Eye Creations	
N O V	17	Prematho Mee Karthik	Rishi	Kartikeya Gummakonda, Simrat Kaur, Gollapudi Maruti Rao, Murali Sharma	Ramanashree Arts	
N O V	17	Snehamera Jeevitham	Upputuri Mahesh	Siva Balaji, Rajeev Kanakala, Sushma Yarlagadda, Chalapati Rao	Gagan Magical Frames	
N O V	24	Napoleon	Anand Ravi	Anand Ravi, Komalee Prasad, Ravi Varma	Acharya Creations	
N O V	24	Baby	D. Suresh	Baby Sathanya, Srivarshini, Manoj K. Bharathi, Shira		
N O V	24	Balakrishnudu	Pavan Mallela	Nara Rohit, Regina Cassandra, Ramya Krishnan, Adithya Menon, Ajay	Saraschandrikaa Visionary Motion Pictures	
N O V	24	Devi Sri Prasad	Sri Kishore	Bhupal Raju, Manoj Nandam, Dhanraj, Pooja Ramachandran		
N O V	24	Jandhyala Rasina Premakatha	Krishna Varma	Sekhar, Sri Lakshmi, Gayatri Gupta, Dileep Kumar	Keerthi Creations	
N O V	24	June 1:43	Bhaskar Bantupalli	Aditya Srivastava, Richa Saxena, Arun Babu, Dimple	Aditya Creations	
N O V	24	Mental Madhilo	Vivek Athreya	Sree Vishnu, Nivetha Pethuraj, Amrutha Srinivasan, Nara Rohit	Dharmapatha Creations	
N O V	30	Oxygen	A. M. Jothi Krishna	Gopichand, Raashi Khanna, Anu Emmanuel, Jagapathi Babu, Shaam, Abhimanyu Singh	Shri Sai Raam Creations	
D E C	1	Jawaan	B. V. S. Ravi	Sai Dharam Tej, Mehreen Pirzada, Prasanna, Subbaraju	Arunachal Creations	
D E C	7	Sapthagiri LLB	Charan Lakkaakula	Saptagiri, Kashish Vohra, Saikumar Pudipeddi, Shakalaka Shankar	Sai Celluloid Cinematic Creations	
D E C	8	B. Tech Babulu	Seenu Imandi	Nandu, Srimukhi, Ali, Pavithra Lokesh, Naval Kishore	JP Creations	
D E C	8	Malli Raava	Gowtam Tinnanuri	Sumanth, Aakanksha Singh, Kadambari Kiran, Annapoorna	Swadharm Entertainment	
D E C	8	Premika	Mahindra	Tanish Alladi, Shruti Yagal	Deshala Art Movies	
D E C	8	Vanavillu	Lanka Prateek Prem Karan	Lanka Prateek Prem Karan, Shravya Rao, Surekha Vani, Kasi Vishwanath	Rahul Prem Movie Makers	
D E C	14	Kiss Kiss Bang Bang	Karthik Medikonda	Kiran, Harshada Kulkarni, Mahesh Kathi, Gayathri Gupta	Dhruva Productions	
D E C	15	Idhi Maa Prema Katha	Ayodhya Karthik	Anchor Ravi, Meghana Lokesh, Prabhas Seenu, Priyadarshi Pullikonda	PLK Productions	
D E C	15	Juliet Lover of Idiot	Ajay Vodhirala	Naveen Chandra, Niveda Thomas, Abhimanyu Singh, Ester Noronha, Ali	Anurag Productions	
D E C	15	Kutumba Katha Chitram	V. S. Vasu	Nandu, Sreemukhi, Kamal Kamaraju	Bhaskar Group Of Media	
D E C	15	Lacchi	Eeshwar	Tej Dilip, Raghu Babu, Jayathi, Tejaswini, Thagubothu Ramesh, Dhanraj Sukhram	J94 Shows	
D E C	15	Mama O Chandamama	Vishaka Venkat	Ram Karthik, Sana Makbul, Suman, Jeeva	East West Entertainments	
D E C	15	Padipoya Nee Mayalo	RK Kampally	Arun Gupta, Saveri Durgam, Jayavardhan	Sri Rajanna Movies & Mahesh Entertainments	
D E C	15	Seetha...Ramuni Kosam	Anil Gopi Reddy	Sharath Sreerangam, Karunya Chowdhary, Thagubothu Ramesh, Bala	Thasmay Chinmayaa Productions & Roll Camera Action	
D E C	15	Tholi Parichayam	L. Radha Krishna	Venky, Lasya, Rajeev Kanakala, Viva Harsha	Thasmay Chinmayaa Productions & Roll Camera Action	
D E C	15	Undha Ledha	Siva Prasad	Ramakrishna, Ankitha	Jaya Kamal Arts	
D E C	21	Middle Class Abbayi	Venu Sree Raam	Nani, Sai Pallavi, Bhumika Chawla	Sri Venkateswara Creations	
D E C	22	E Ee	Ram Ganapati Rao	Neiraj Sham, Naira Shah, Thagubothu Ramesh, Krishna Bhagawan	Nawabala Creations	
D E C	22	Hello	Vikram Kumar	Akhil Akkineni, Kalyani Priyadarshan, Jagapathi Babu, Ramya Krishna, Ajay	Annapurna Studios	
D E C	28	Okka Kshanam	Vi Anand	Allu Sirish, Surbhi, Seerat Kapoor, Srinivas Avasarala, Jayaprakash	Lakshmi Narasimha Entertainments	
D E C	29	2 Countries	N. Shankar	Sunil, Manisha Raj, Sanjjanaa, Naresh	Maha Lakshmi Arts	

== See also ==
- List of Telugu films of 2016
- Lists of Telugu-language films
- List of Telugu films of 2018
