= Lakshmi Narasimha Entertainments =

Indian film production company

- Company type: Private
- Industry: Entertainment
- Founded: Hyderabad, Telangana in 2011
- Headquarters: Hyderabad, India
- Key people: Chakri Chigurupati
- Products: Films
- Owner: Chakri Chigurupati

Lakshmi Narasimha Entertainments (Telugu: లక్ష్మీ నరసింహ ఎంటర్‌టైన్‌మెంట్) is an Indian film production company established by film producer, Chakri Chigurupati. The company is based in Hyderabad, Telangana and produced Veedu Theda (2011), Swamy Ra Ra (2013), Mosagallaku Mosagadu (2015), C/O Surya (2017), and Okka Kshanam (2017).

== Production company and success ==
Chakri Chigurupati established Lakshmi Narasimha Entertainments in 2011. The first film that was made under the banner was Veedu Theda (2011), directed by screenwriter, Chinni Krishna. In 2013, the banner introduced Sudheer Varma with Swamy Ra Ra. It received critical praise and brought back the crime comedy genre to Telugu cinema.

In 2015, the banner produced Mosagallaku Mosagadu, under the direction of Nellore Bose, however, it received mixed-to-negative reviews and was a disaster at the box-office. In 2017, the banner produced two films under the direction of Suseenthiran and Vi Anand, respectively, C/O Surya and Okka Kshanam.

== Film Production ==
Year	Film	Actors	Director	Notes
2011	Veedu Theda	Nikhil Siddharth	Chinni Krishna	
2013	Swamy Ra Ra	Nikhil Siddharth, Swathi Reddy	Sudheer Varma	
2015	Mosagallaku Mosagadu	Sudheer Babu	Nellore Bose	
2017	C/O Surya	Sundeep Kishan, Mehreen	Suseenthiran	
2017	Okka Kshanam	Allu Sirish, Seerat Kapoor, Surbhi	Vi Anand	
