= Jamboo Savari (film) =

- Directed by: Venugopal
- Written by: Sudheer Varma
- Based on: Swamy Ra Ra (2013)
- Produced by: A Hariprasad Roa; A Prasad Choudary
- Starring: Prajwal Devaraj; Nikki Galrani
- Music by: S Premkumar
- Release date: 13 June 2014
- Running time: 131 minutes
- Country: India
- Language: Kannada

Jamboo Savari is a 2014 Kannada crime comedy film starring Prajwal Devaraj and Nikki Galrani in the lead role. The film is directed by K. C. Venugopal and produced by Hari Prasad Rao under HPR Entertainment Pvt Limited banner. The music for the film is composed by S. Premkumar. It was released on 13 June 2014.

The film is a remake of successful Telugu film Swamy Ra Ra which starred Nikhil Siddharth and Swati Reddy.

== Cast ==
- Prajwal Devaraj as Balu
- Nikki Galrani as Purvi
- Chaitra Rai as Pinky
- Achyuth Kumar as Sethuram
- Shobharaj
- Shille Manjunath

== Soundtrack ==
No.	Title	Singer(s)	Length
1.	"Oorey Eddiralu"	L. N. Shastry
2.	"Tusu Mellane"	Koushik
3.	"Kannigoo Kaanade"	Aakanksha Badami, Koushik
4.	"Bende Kallurinali"	Shilpa
5.	"Life Andre"	S. Premkumar

== Release ==
Movie was released on 13 June 2014 across Karnataka.

The Times of India gave the film a rating of three out of five stars and stated that "Prajwal steals the show with a livewire performance. Glamorous Chaithra Rai has put life and soul into her character. Music by S Premkumar and camerawork by V Prathap bolster the script and performances".
