= Bangaru Bullodu =

Bangaru Bullodu (lit. 'Gold Bull') may refer to:

- Bangaru Bullodu (1993 film), an Indian Telugu-language action drama directed by Ravi Raja Pinisetty
- Bangaru Bullodu (2021 film), an Indian Telugu-language comedy directed by P. V. Giri
