= Son of India =

Son of India may refer to:

- Son of India (1931 film), an American film directed by Jacques Feyder
- Son of India (1962 film), a Bollywood film directed by Mehboob Khan
- Son of India (2021 film), an upcoming Telugu-language film directed by Diamond Ratnababu
