= Mosagallaku Mosagadu (2015 film) =

Mosagalakku Mosagadu
- Poster
- Directed by: Nellore Bose
- Produced by: Chakri Chigurupati
- Starring: Sudheer Babu; Nandini Rai; Abhimanyu Singh
- Cinematography: Sai Prakash Ummadisingu
- Edited by: Karthika Srinivas
- Music by: Manikanth Kadri
- Production company: Lakshmi Narasimha Entertainments
- Release date: 22 May 2015
- Running time: 127 minutes
- Country: India
- Language: Telugu

Mosagalakku Mosagadu (transl. Cheater to the cheaters) is a 2015 Indian Telugu-language black comedy crime film directed by Nellore Bose and produced by Chakri Chigurapati under the Lakshmi Narasimha Entertainments banner. It stars Sudheer Babu, Nandini Rai and Abhimanyu Singh. Manchu Manoj enacted a guest role in the film. It was released on 22 May 2015. This film is a spiritual sequel for the film Swamy Ra Ra starring Nikhil Siddharth.

== Plot ==
The idols of Rama and Sita get stolen from a temple situated 12 km away from Ayodhya. Rudra, the mastermind behind the robbery, sets a deal of ₹20 crores (200 million) for the idols. Krishna is a thief and a con artist. He falls in love with Janaki and tries to impress her. Masterji Rama Chandra, a teacher and founder of Ramakrishna Vidhyalayam, gets a default notice from the bank. The investigating officer finds thieves in a hotel and they run away with the idols of Lord Rama and Sita each. One of them, Amit, contacts Rudra and he orders Amit to hide in Guruji's house for a few days. The other guy hands over the idol of Sita to Rudra. Guruji sends Krishna to steal the idol of Lord Rama from Amit. Krishna gets away with the idol while Amit gets shot by the investigating officer.

Rudra comes to India after knowing that the idol was stolen. Krishna inquires the value of the idol and learns that it is of no value without the idol of Sita. Krishna returns the idol to Rudra and manages to stay with him. Rudra plans to sell the idol during a marriage of Guruji's henchman. Meanwhile, the bank auctions the land of the school for loan recovery. Krishna steals the money from Rudra and hands over the idols to the investigating officer. He sends the money through his friend Manchu Manoj to mastaru. Rudra, Guruji and the smugglers get arrested. Nandini asks Krishna for the reason behind stealing money. He tells her that mastaru saved his life in his childhood when he met with an accident. The film ends with Krishna and Nandini uniting and the idols returned to the temple.

== Cast ==
- Sudheer Babu as Krishna "Krish"
- Nandini Rai as Janaki
- Abhimanyu Singh as Rudra
- Chandra Mohan as Masterji Rama Chandra
- Jaya Prakash Reddy as Kaushik Guruji
- Pankaj Kesari
- Praveen as Krishna's friend
- Saptagiri
- Duvvasi Mohan as Kaushik's sidekick
- Fish Venkat as Kaushik's henchmen
- Shakalaka Shankar

== Soundtrack ==
| No. | Title | Singer(s) | Length |
|---|---|---|---|
| 1. | "Oho Sundari" | Sooraj Santhosh |
| 2. | "Naavaadai" | Chinmayi, Nakul Abhyankar |
| 3. | "Mosagallaku Mosagadu" | Baba Sehgal |
| 4. | "Oho Sundari" (Remix) | Naveen |
| 5. | "Hello Hello" | Karthik, Supriya Lohith |
| 6. | "Raamaaya Raamabhadraaya" | Sooraj Santhosh |
| 7. | "Call For Mosagaallaku Mosagaadu" | MC Vickey |

== Critical reception ==
123Telugu wrote "On the whole, Mosagallaku Mosagadu will provide a decent relief for Sudheer Babu’s career. A slow first half and predictable nature of the script are basic drawbacks. If you manage to sit through the first half an hour and stop looking for logics, you can easily give this film a shot for its decent comedy in the second half." Telugucinema wrote "The movie has not much runtime but as there is no story, the film just drags. Many romantic sequences can be edited. New director has grip over technical aspects but he should have focused more on writing". Greatandhra has given 2.75 rating and called it a time-pass movie.
