= Jagannatakam (2015 film) =

- Directed by: Pradeep Nandan
- Written by: Pradeep Nandan (story / dialogues)
- Screenplay by: Pradeep Nandan
- Produced by: Aadisesha Reddy Indupuru
- Starring: Pradeep Nandan; Khenisaa Chandran
- Cinematography: Satish Mutyala
- Edited by: Chandra Sekhar G. V.
- Music by: Ajay Arasada
- Release date: 13 March 2015
- Country: India
- Language: Telugu

Jagannathakam is a 2015 Telugu-language, thriller drama film, produced by Aadi Sesha Reddy Indupuru Rao under the banner Chitrasouda and directed by Pradeep Nandan. It stars Pradeep Nandan and Khenisha Chandran.

== Plot ==
Prudhvi (Pradeep Nandan) is a cheerful guy who lives with his father and sister (Ushasri). His only goal in life is to become an actor. One day he comes across Bhanu (Khenisha Chandran) and falls flat for her. As time passes, even Bhanu accept his love and the couple spend some happy times together. When everything seems to go well, he gets a huge break from acting in a big budget film. Exalted with that, Prudhvi organizes a party for all his friends. Partying, Prudhvi receives dreaded call that her father died. He quickly rushed home only to discover that her sister was kidnapped. What happened to his sister? How is his father's death? and How does Prudhvi solve all his problems ? is the rest of the film.

== Cast ==
- Pradeep Nandan as Prudhvi
- Khenisaa Chandran as Bhanu
- Abhinav Gomatam
- Sivaji Raja as Police Officer
- Usha Sri as Divya
- Kiran
- Kedhar Shankar
- Avinash as Banti
- Pooja Jhaveri as Item Girl

== Soundtrack ==
Jagannatakam

Film score by Ajay Arasada
- Released: 2015
- Genre: Soundtrack
- Producer: Ajay Arasada

No.	Title	Music	Length
1.	"Ayyayyo"	Ajay Arasada
2.	"Jagannatakam"	Ajay Arasada
3.	"Rekkedo"	Ajay Arasada
