= Echo (2023 film) =

- Theatrical release poster
- Directed by: Nawin Ghanesh
- Produced by: S. Rajasekar
- Starring: Srikanth; Vidya Pradeep; Pooja Jhaveri
- Cinematography: Gopinath
- Edited by: R. Sudharsan
- Music by: Naren Balakumar
- Production company: Sri Vishnu Visions
- Release date: 21 July 2023
- Country: India
- Language: Tamil

Echo is a 2023 Indian Tamil-language psychological thriller film directed by Nawin Ghanesh and starring Srikanth and Vidya Pradeep in the lead roles. It was released on 21 July 2023 and received positive reviews from critics.

== Cast ==
- Srikanth as Prakash
- Ashish Vidyarthi as Edward
- Vidya Pradeep as Nila
- Pooja Jhaveri as Diya
- Srinath as Rajesh
- Kaali Venkat as Murugan
- Ashwin Raja
- Delhi Ganesh
- Praveena
- Mona Bedre
- Vaidyanathan Padmanabhan

== Production ==
Nawin Ghanesh first conceptualised Echo as a short film during 2015 and later adapted it into a feature film-length script to mark his directorial debut. The project was formally announced in August 2020, with Srikanth and Vidya Pradeep joining the cast of the film. Owing to the COVID-19 pandemic, the makers opted to shoot the film primarily in indoor locations, with the shoot of the film beginning by September 2020.

Ashish Vidyarthi signed on to work on his first Tamil film since 2015, having earlier opted to stay away from the industry citing that he was getting typecast in roles. The shoot of the film was primarily completed by March 2021, with Ghanesh revealing that he was open to the film having either a theatrical or a straight-to-television release. In May 2021, Srikanth shot for extra scenes with actress Pooja Jhaveri in Pondicherry.

== Reception ==
The film was released on 21 July 2023 across Tamil Nadu. Reviewing the film, a critic from Maalai Malar wrote the film "was a good effort". A critic from Dina Thanthi praised the film's screenplay, while a critic from Raj TV also gave the film a positive review, praising the director's handling of the script. A critic from Chennai Vision gave 3.4 out of 5 stating that it's a must watch thriller with excellent twists and turns giving audience a new experience.
