= Veedu Theda =

- Directed by: Chinni Krishna
- Produced by: Kalyan Chakravarthy
- Starring: Nikhil Siddharth; Puja Banerjee; Sayaji Shinde; Ali; Suman
- Cinematography: V. Malhar Bhatt Joshi
- Edited by: Gautham Raju
- Music by: Chakri
- Distributed by: Lakshmi Narasimha Entertainments
- Release date: 18 November 2011
- Country: India
- Language: Telugu

Veedu Theda (English: He is different) is a 2011 Indian Telugu-language action romantic comedy film directed by Chinni Krishna and produced by Chakri Chigurapati under Lakshmi Narasimha Entertainments banner. It stars Nikhil Siddharth and Puja Banerjee. Released on 18 November 2011, the film became moderately successful at the box office, and went on to run for 50 days at select centers. In 2012, the film was dubbed and released in Hindi as Panjaa The Tiger.

== Plot ==
Katthi Seenu (Nikhil Siddharth) is a carefree and brash youngster from Tirupati, who lives with his sister (Hema) and her husband (Krishna Bhagavaan). A chance meeting with Love Kumar (Ali) leads him to Bheemavaram, where he comes across Meghana (Pooja Bose). It is love at first sight for Seenu but Meghana does not reciprocate his feelings.

As the story progresses, it is revealed that Meghana has a past that is connected to the notorious don Liquor Shankar (Sayaji Shinde) and a jailed convict Das (Suman). They start pursuing Meghana and it is now up to Seenu to step in as her saviour.

== Cast ==
- Nikhil Siddharth as Kaththi Seenu
- Puja Banerjee as Meghana
- Ali as Love Kumar
- Brahmanandam as Banana Baba
- Krishna Bhagavaan as Seenu's Brother in Law
- Hema as Seenu's Sister
- Raghu Babu as Yugandhar
- M. S. Narayana as Pachipulusu Nageswara Rao
- Aas Mohammad Abbasi as Kartik
- Sayaji Shinde as Liquor Shankar
- Suman as Das
- Master Bharath as Abbayi Raju
- Venu Madhav as Udata Bhaskar
- Fish Venkat

== Soundtrack ==
The soundtrack, consisting of five songs, was composed by Chakri.

No.	Title	Singer(s)	Length
1.	"Ekkada Ekkada"	Chakri, Megha	04:20
2.	"Ni Andham"	Geetha Madhuri, Vasu	04:24
3.	"Needaithe Kanu"	Mathin	03:51
4.	"Marumalle Theega"	Sri Krishna	04:23
5.	"Prema Prema"	Simha	03:55

== Reception ==
The Times of India gave the film three stars out of five, calling the screenplay "unimaginative and the music formulaic, composed exclusively for the front rows." 123Telugu gave the film two and a half stars, labeling it an "outdated comedy", praising Nikhil and some of the spoofs, while criticism was aimed strongly towards Bose, dialogues and most of the comedy scenes.
