= Right Right =

- Directed by: Manu
- Story by: Sugeeth
- Produced by: J. Vamsi Krishna
- Starring: Sumanth Ashwin; Prabhakar; Pooja Jhaveri
- Cinematography: Sekhar V. Joseph
- Edited by: S. B. Uddhav
- Music by: Jeevan Babu
- Production company: Sri Satya Entertainments
- Release date: 10 June 2016
- Country: India
- Language: Telugu

Right Right is a 2016 Indian Telugu language film, directed by Manu and produced by J. Vamsi Krishna. A remake of the Malayalam film Ordinary, the film stars Sumanth Ashwin and Prabhakar in the lead roles, while Pooja Jhaveri, Nassar, and Vinoth Kishan play supporting roles. The music was composed by Jeevan Babu with cinematography by Sekhar V. Joseph and editing by S. B. Uddhav. The film released on 10 June 2016.

== Plot ==
Ravi is a youngster who always dreamed of being a cop but ends up becoming a bus conductor in a small village. He quickly makes friends with all the fellow villagers, including the village headmaster Venu and Venu's friend's daughter Amrutha (who he raised). Amrutha is the fiancée of Deva, the headmaster's real son. Ravi also makes friends with a fellow villager, Bhadram, and the driver of his bus, Seshu. He also falls in love with a fellow villager, Kalyani, who also has feelings for him. One fine day, Seshu is drunk and asks Ravi to drive the bus. Ravi accidentally crashes intro someone and gets him onto a vehicle. Ravi finds a bag and takes it home. Ravi and Seshu open it and find a photo of him and his family with his father being the headmaster, and him being Deva.

The next day, Ravi and Seshu inquire in all the hospitals nearby but find no dead body admitted in an accident case the previous night. The police then come that night and say that they found a dead body, which turns out to be Deva's. Ravi and Seshu are shocked and keep looking for the vehicle driver but fail to find him. One day. Kalyani takes a letter form Deva's bag that Ravi was reading, thinking that it was hers. Ravi tries to snatch the letter from her but fails and Kalyani drops it. Amrutha finds it and starts crying. The whole village comes, and Bhadram beats up Ravi. Ravi then gets arrested. Seshu then sees the vehicle driver and gets Ravi out on bail. Ravi and Seshu chase and catch the driver and figure out the truth. They bring him into the middle of the village and tell him to tell him the truth to all the other villagers. Bhadram then comes and tries to kill him, and Ravi reveals that he is the actual culprit.

It is then revealed that Bhadram had had feelings for Amrutha since childhood and killed Deva after figuring out that he was her fiance. Deva lands right in front of Ravi's bus and falls down, thereby Ravi not crashing into him. The driver and Bhadram escape together and stop on a bridge as they almost crash into Amrutha. Bhadram forces Amrutha to come with him, and the villagers all then come to the bridge. Bhadram takes Amrutha hostage, and no one comes to save her. With everyone not caring and coming near him, Bhadram realizes that he cannot kill her and commits suicide by jumping off the bridge. The film ends with Ravi marrying Kalyani and Ravi and Seshu having another bus post together.

== Cast ==
- Sumanth Ashwin as Ravi
- Prabhakar as Seshu
- Pooja Jhaveri as Kalyani
- Pavani Gangireddy as Amrutha
- Nassar as Venu Master
- Vinoth Kishan as Bhadram
- Sudha as Ravi's mother
- Thagubothu Ramesh as Ravi's friend
- Dhanraj
- Shakalaka Shankar as Drama Rao
- Jeeva
- Rajyalakshmi
- Gautham Raju
- Bharath Reddy as Bhaskar
- Raja Ravindra
- Karuna Bhushan
- Jaya Vani
- Meesam Suresh

== Production ==
The film's first look was released on 10 November 2015.

== Soundtrack ==
No.	Title	Singer(s)	Length
1.	"Alli Billi Chakiligilli"	Ahmath
2.	"Bhoogolam Bantilaga"	Venu Srirangam, Malavika
3.	"Rangu Rangula Tharalu"	Mohana Bhogaraju, Anudeep Dev
4.	"Penumantallo Chiruguvva"	Aditya Iyengar
5.	"Right Right Padamani"	Sahiti Chaganti, Praharsha, Sriya Madhuri, Jayaram, Pranathi

== Release ==
Right Right was released on 10 June 2016 across Telangana and Andhra Pradesh. The movie was declared as a flop.
