= Where Is the Venkatalakshmi =

- Theatrical release poster
- Directed by: Kishore (Ladda)
- Produced by: M. Sridhar Reddy; H. Anand Reddy; R. K. Reddy
- Starring: Raai Laxmi; Madhunandan; Praveen
- Cinematography: Venkat R. Shakamuri
- Music by: Hari Gowra
- Production company: ABT Creations
- Release date: 15 March 2019
- Country: India
- Language: Telugu

Where Is the Venkatalakshmi is a 2019 Indian Telugu-language comedy drama film starring Raai Laxmi. The film was released on 15 March 2019. The film received negative reviews with criticism for the characters, direction and screenplay.

== Cast ==
- Raai Laxmi as Venkatalakshmi
- Madhunandan as Pandugadu
- Praveen as Chantigadu
- Ram Karthik as Sekhar
- Pujita Ponnada as Gowri
- Pankaj Kesari as Veera Reddy, a rowdy
- Brahmaji as Suryam
- Jabardasth Mahesh
- Gemini Suresh
- Ramana Reddy

== Production ==
The film was shot in Hyderabad.

== Soundtrack ==
Soundtrack was composed by Hari Gowra.

- "Kannamesi Nodi Kanta" – Lokeshwar
- "Yem Jaruguthondi Nalo" – Kaala Bahirava, Harini
- "Rara Venu Gopabala" – Harini, Lokeshwar, Saicharan
- "Yemaya Chesindo" – Hari Gowra
- "Papa Atthili Papa" – Mangli, Hari Gowra, Lokeshwar, Saicharan, Arun, Raghu Ram

== Marketing ==
The trailer was released on 19 February.

== Release ==
The Times of India gave the film one-and-a-half out of five stars and wrote that "It's almost as if the writers of Where Is the Venkatalakshmi decided to sit at the table and create the worst characters to ever be made on-screen". New Indian Express gave the film two out of five stars and wrote that "Despite having some potential cast, director Kishore Kumaar has to take the blame for failing them miserably and not making this script work today". 123 Telugu wrote "On the whole, Where Is the Venkatalakshmi is a good script gone wrong kind of a film. Lakshmi Rai, comedians Madhu and Praveen try to save the film with their sincere efforts but the second half has nothing going its way and kills the interest of the audience."
