= Voter (film) =

2019 Indian Telugu film

- Theatrical release poster
- Directed by: G. S. Karthik Reddy
- Written by: G. S. Karthik Reddy
- Produced by: John Sudheer Pudhota
- Starring: Vishnu Manchu; Surbhi; Sampath Raj
- Cinematography: Rajesh Yadav
- Edited by: Praveen K. L.
- Music by: S. Thaman
- Production company: Rama Reels
- Release date: 21 June 2019
- Running time: 117 minutes
- Country: India
- Language: Telugu

Voter is a 2019 Indian Telugu-language political thriller film written and directed by G. S. Karthik Reddy and produced by Pudhota Sudheer Kumar. The film stars Vishnu Manchu and Surbhi in lead roles, with Sampath Raj, Posani Krishna Murali, Jayaprakash, Nassar in prominent roles. The music is composed by S. Thaman. It was released on 21 June 2019.

== Plot ==
Gautam, who works in the US, comes back to India to cast his vote. In this process, he falls in love with Bhavana and proposes to her. Bhavana lays a condition to Gautam that if he fulfills a particular task related to a dreaded central minister, Bhanu Shankar she will accept his love.

== Cast ==
- Vishnu Manchu as Gautam
- Surbhi as Bhavana
- Sampath Raj as Central Minister Bhanu Shankar
- Posani Krishna Murali as M.L.A.
- Jayaprakash as Siva
- Nassar as Krishnamoorthy
- Brahmaji as Madhava Rao
- Supreet as Prakash
- Praveen as Jagdish
- Pragathi as Pragathi
- L.B. Sriram as Bhiksaraju
- Shanoor Sana as Bhavana's mother
- Sravan as Gautam's friend
- Vamsi as Gautam's friend
- Mou Rahman as Ross
- Charandeep as Bhanu Shankar's assistant
- Jeeva as Traffic Police Officer

== Soundtrack ==
Voter

Soundtrack album by S. Thaman
- Released: 24 May 2019
- Recorded: 2019
- Genre: Soundtrack
- Length: 12:15
- Label: Mango Music
- Producer: S. Thaman

S. Thaman chronology
Aruvam (2019)	Voter (2019)	Magamuni (2019)
External audio
- Audio Jukebox on YouTube

The soundtrack of the film was composed by S. Thaman and lyrics by Ramajogaiah Sastry.

Track list
No.	Title	Singer(s)	Length
1.	"6 Feet Tall"	Rahul Nambiar	3:05
2.	"Nee Maatera Sasanam"	Saicharan Bhaskaruni	2:40
3.	"Shivam Theme"	Sri Krishna, Aditya, Raghuram	3:25
4.	"Touch Karo"	Megha, Sruthi, Amala	3:05
Total length:			12:15

== Release ==
It was theatrically released on 21 June 2019.

== Reception ==
The film received negative reviews from critics. Y Sunita Chowdhary of The Hindu opined that there was nothing new to hold attention. She noted that the entire story had been woven around the re-call concept, which is, "A new concept called ‘Re-call’ election, which means once a politician is voted to power and people are unhappy with him, they needn’t wait for a full five-year term; they can have a re-call poll and vote him out". She felt that there’s nothing to appreciate in music and cinematography also.
