= Praveen (actor) =

Indian actor

- Born: Bellamkonda Praveen; 8 January 1984 (age 42); Antarvedi, Andhra Pradesh, India
- Occupation: Actor
- Years active: 2008–present

Praveen is an Indian actor known for his comic roles in Telugu films like Prema Katha Chitram, Sambho Siva Sambho, Rama Rama Krishna Krishna, Mirapakay, Kartikeya and Bhale Bhale Magadivoy and Sathamanam Bhavati.

== Filmography ==
List of Praveen film credits
Year	Title	Role	Notes
2008	Kotha Bangaru Lokam	Balu's friend	
2009	Billa	Ranga's friend	
2009	Ride	Mahesh's friend	
2009	Gopi Gopika Godavari		
2010	Shambo Shiva Shambo		
2010	Betting Bangaraju		
2010	Rama Rama Krishna Krishna		
2010	Amaayakudu		
2010	Baava		
2010	Nagavalli		
2010	Kalavar King	Sathya	
2010	Em Pillo Em Pillado	Ram's friend	
2011	Mirapakay		
2011	Ala Modalaindi	Rowdy	
2011	Adi Nuvve		
2011	Amayakudu	Krishna's friend	
2011	Kandireega		
2011	100% Love	Beer boy	
2011	Veera	Veera's friend	
2011	Wanted	Ram Babu's friend	
2011	Solo		
2011	Vankaayi Fry		
2011	Mogudu		
2012	Bodyguard	Cash Reddi's friend	
2012	Nippu	Surya's friend	
2012	Uu Kodathara? Ulikki Padathara?		
2012	Onamalu	Sundaram	
2012	Gabbar Singh	Ranjit Kumar's PA	
2012	Devaraya		
2012	Gundello Godari		
2012	Chanakyudu		
2012	Yamudiki Mogudu		
2013	Seethamma Vakitlo Sirimalle Chettu		
2013	Ongole Gitta		
2013	Love Cycle		
2013	Swamy Ra Ra	Jogi	
2013	Rai Rai		
2013	Naayak	Venu's friend	
2013	Dillunnodu		
2013	Balupu	Ravi's friend	
2013	Prema Katha Chitram	Praveen	
2013	Ramayya Vasthavayya	Nandu's friend	
2013	Doosukeltha		
2013	Venkatadri Express		
2014	Adavi Kaachina Vennela		
2014	Siva Kesav		
2014	Nuvve Naa Bangaram		
2014	Boy Meets Girl (Tholiprema Katha)	RJ Bobby Bokkala	
2014	Kotha Janta		
2014	Rabhasa	Kartik's friend	
2014	Kartikeya	Kartikeya's friend	
2014	Teeyani Kalavo		
2014	Rowdy Fellow	Constable Reddy	
2014	Brother of Bommali		
2014	Maine Pyar Kiya		
2014	Alludu Seenu	Lungi Baba's friend	
2014	Toli Sandhya Velalo		
2014	Mukunda	Sathish	
2015	Pataas	GK's nephew	
2015	Dochey	Chandu's friend	
2015	Ketugadu		
2015	Bham Bolenath		
2015	Mosagaallaku Mosagadu	Krish's friend	
2015	James Bond	Praveen	
2015	Cinema Choopistha Mava	Rahul	
2015	Surya vs Surya		
2015	Tiger	Tiger's friend	
2015	Dynamite	Shiv's friend	
2015	Bhale Bhale Magadivoy	Praveen	
2015	Bhale Manchi Roju	Aadi	
2015	Sankarabharanam		
2016	Abbayitho Ammayi		
2016	Veeri Veeri Gummadi Pandu		
2016	Run	Mani	
2016	Oopiri	Seenu's friend	
2016	Thozha	Seenu's friend	Tamil film
2016	A Aa	Muthyam	
2016	Manamantha		
2016	Premam	Vasu	
2016	Chal Chal Gurram		
2016	Ekkadiki Pothavu Chinnavada	Ganta Ram	
2016	Jayammu Nischayammu Raa	Tatkal	
2017	Sathamanam Bhavati	Raju's friend	
2017	Kittu Unnadu Jagratha	Kittu's friend	
2017	Raju Gari Gadhi 2	Praveen	
2017	Jai Lava Kusa	Kusa's friend	
2017	Khaidi No. 150		
2017	Gunturodu	Kanna's friend	
2017	Hello	Taxi Driver	
2017	C/O Surya		
2017	Okka Kshanam	Puppy Rao	
2017	Balakrishnudu		
2018	Chalo	Auto driver	
2018	Naa... Nuvve	Ravi	
2018	Raju Gadu		
2018	Srinivasa Kalyanam	Praveen	
2018	Nela Ticket	Rajesh	
2018	Lover	Praveen	
2018	Achari America Yatra		
2018	Hello Guru Prema Kosame	Mechanic	
2019	Jersey	Rajesh	
2019	Where Is the Venkatalakshmi	Chantigadu	
2019	Ranarangam	Deva's assistant	
2019	Jodi		
2019	Voter	Jagdish	
2019	Thipparaa Meesam		
2019	Prati Roju Pandage	Harish	
2019	Bhagyanagara Veedullo Gamattu		Also co-producer
2019	Sita	Bus Conductor	
2019	90ML	Vignesh	
2020	Entha Manchivaadavuraa	Ashwin	
2020	Miss India	Bijju	
2020	Maafia		
2021	Super Over	Murali	
2021	Bangaru Bullodu	Bank employee	
2021	Naandhi	Santosh	
2021	Thimmarusu		
2021	Kanabadutaledu		
2021	Crazy Uncles		
2021	Tuck Jagadish	Sai	
2021	Manchi Rojulochaie	Linga Babu	
2022	Bangarraju	Rambabu	
2022	Sri Sri Sri Rajavaru		
2022	Chor Bazaar		
2022	Pakka Commercial	Junior Lawyer	
2022	Karthikeya 2	Karthik's friend	
2022	Itlu Maredumilli Prajaneekam		
2022	Dhamaka	Swami’s friend	
2022	Raajahyogam	Karan	
2023	Waltair Veerayya	Police Officer	
2023	Vinaro Bhagyamu Vishnu Katha	Vishnu’s friend	
2023	Ravanasura	Ruhana’s colleague	
2023	Organic Mama Hybrid Alludu		
2023	Kannitheevu	Manoj	Tamil film
2023	My Name Is Shruthi		
2024	Prathinidhi 2		
2024	Purushothamudu	Satthi	
2024	Shivam Bhaje		
2024	Mr. Bachchan		
2024	Maruthi Nagar Subramanyam	Kala Rani’s cousin	
2024	Dhoom Dhaam	Dinare	
2025	Sri Sri Sri Raja Vaaru	Raja’s brother-in-law	
2025	Bakasura Restaurant	Paramesh	
2025	Trimukha		
2025	Mass Jathara	Subrahmanyam	
2026	Vishnu Vinyasam	Bilahari	
2026	Ustaad Bhagat Singh	Dr Samanvi’s assistant	
2026	Lenin	Dwaraka	
2026	Aakasamlo Oka Tara	Ramesh	

=== Television ===
Year	Title	Role	Network
2024	Yakshini	Bunty	Disney+ Hotstar
