= Pankaj Kesari =

Indian actor

- Occupation: Theatre artist, actor
- Years active: 2008–present

Pankaj Kesari is an Indian film actor who works in Bhojpuri, Telugu and Hindi language films.

== Career ==
In addition to his work in Bhojpuri and Telugu cinema, Kesari has continued to expand his presence across regional Indian film industries. According to media reports published in 2023, after appearing in more than 45 Bhojpuri films and over 19 South Indian films, he signed his first major Bollywood project, marking his debut as a lead actor in Hindi cinema.

Media reports have described Kesari as one of the actors from Bihar who successfully transitioned from Bhojpuri cinema to South Indian films before entering Hindi cinema. Pankaj worked as a theatre artist in Patna and as a Mumbai-based VJ before foraying into films. He starred in more than thirty Bhojpuri films before debuting in Telugu with Kaalicharan in a negative role. After Kaalicharan, Pankaj went on to portray negative roles in other Telugu films including Where Is the Venkatalakshmi (2019).

== Partial filmography ==
=== Bhojpuri films ===
Year	Film	Role	Notes
2008	Pratigya		
2008	Vidhata		
2009	Baklol Dulha		
2009	Bah Khiladi Bah		
2009	Sahar Wali Jaan Mareli		
2009	Pariwar		
2010	Tezaab		
2010	Nathuniya Par Goli Mare		
2011	Trinetra		
2011	Kabhi Aave Na Judai		
2011	Mora Balma Chhail Chhabila		
2011	Elaan	Sooryadev's assistant	
2015	Gola Barood		
2017	Joru Ka Ghulam	Obedient husband	
2018	Sawariya Tohse Lagi Kaisi Lagan		

=== Telugu films ===
Year	Film	Role	Notes
2013	Kaalicharan	Pasupathy	
2015	Bham Bolenath	Vasool Raja	
2015	Where Is Vidya Balan		
2015	Mosagallaku Mosagadu		
2015	Shivam	Peddi Reddy	
2015	Araku Road Lo		
2018	Where Is the Venkatalakshmi	Veera Reddy	
2018	Ranarangam	Pankaj	
2019	Gaddalakonda Ganesh		
2021	Seetimaarr		
2024	Mr. Bachchan	Sambha Shiva	
2026	Ustad Bhagat Singh	Kashi	

=== Hindi films ===
Year	Film	Role	Notes
2018	Kaashi in Search of Ganga		
