= Run (2016 film) =

- poster
- Directed by: Anil Kanneganti
- Based on: Neram by Alphonse Puthren
- Produced by: Sudhakar Cherukuri; Kishore Garikipati; Ajay Sunkara
- Starring: Sundeep Kishan; Anisha Ambrose; Bobby Simha
- Cinematography: B. Rajasekar
- Edited by: M. R. Varma
- Music by: Sai Karthik
- Release date: 23 March 2016
- Running time: 110 min
- Country: India
- Language: Telugu

Run is a 2016 Indian Telugu-language black comedy thriller film directed by Anil Kanneganti and produced by Ajay Sunkara, Kishore Garikipati, and Sudhakar Cherukuri. It is the remake of Malayalam and Tamil bilingual Neram. The film features Sundeep Kishan and Anisha Ambrose in the lead roles, while Bobby Simha reprises his role as Vatti Raja from the bilingual film. The film was released worldwide on 23 March 2016 to positive critical acclaim.

== Plot ==
Sanju is a computer engineering graduate but lost his job. His life is complicated now because he has taken a loan from a predatory moneylender named Vatti Raja and is not able to repay the amount. Amu's father Srinivas refuses her marriage with Sanju as he is jobless. Amu decides to elope with Sanju, and his friend Mani gives him the money for paying off his debt to Raja. On their way, Amu's chain is snatched, and Sanju's money is stolen. Raja calls Sanju and asks him to settle the money by 5p.m.

Srinivas lodges a complaint with Sub-Inspector Padmavathi against Sanju on charges of kidnapping Amu and gives his number. Padmavathi calls Sanju and tells him that he should come along with Amu to the police station by 5PM, but problems are yet to come; Sanju's brother-in-law asks money from him to start a business by 5PM and sticks him with a restaurant bill that Mani again has to pay. On the other hand, Amu is kidnapped by Raja's men and stuffed in the dickey of his car after they assume she is the girlfriend of Manik, who also has to return money to Raja. With all these problems, Sanju is desperate for a solutions.

Sanju comes across Manik and decides to snatch his chain, but in a twist of fate he is hit by an auto and Sanju ends up saving him. At the hospital, Manik's brother Posani Balakrishna, a wannabe big shot, promises Sanju of a job in his company. He decides to kill the auto owner, who turns out to be Vaddi Raja, and takes an unwilling Sanju along. However, Padmavathi arrives and says that Raja died in an accident. A flashback reveals that Lighthouse (Shani Salmon), the man who stole Amu's chain and Sanju's money, had borrowed some money from Raja, too. He plots with two others in having the money for themselves and stealing Raja's car. While the plan works out perfectly, Raja's men went behind the car, and Raja goes behind the other man. In the chase, Raja is hit by an auto and dies; it turns out the driver had also been indebted to him and was told to cover up his non-working brakes, and was also the one who hit Manik.

Finally, Sanju meets the men who stole his money and involves in a brawl with them. He finds his money and Amu, who sees that the chain thief was also in Lighthouse's gang and finds her chain in the car. Sanju gives the money to his brother-in-law, and the movie ends with a happy note that "Time is of two types: good time and bad time. Good will come following every bad time in life".

== Cast ==
- Sundeep Kishan as Sanjay "Sanju"
- Anisha Ambrose as Amulya "Amu"
- Bobby Simha as Vatti Raja
- Y. Kasi Viswanath as Srinivas
- Posani Krishna Murali as Posani Balakrishna
- Brahmaji as SI I. Padmavathi
- Praveen as Mani
- Mahat Raghavendra as Manikyam "Manik
- Shani Salmon as Lighthouse
- Madhunandan as Sanju's brother-in-law
- Ambati Srinivas as Auto Driver
- Surya as Money Borrower
- Sivannarayana Naripeddi as Doctor
- Fish Venkat as Posani's follower

== Soundtracks ==
The music was composeed by Sai Karthik. "Pista" and "Bejawada" are reused from "Pistah" from the original film.

- Pista
- Bujji Bujji
- Bhago Bhago
- Bejawada
- Amulya

== Release ==
Run was released on 23 March 2016 across Telangana and Andhra Pradesh coinciding with Holi Festival.

== Reception ==
Y. Sunitha Chowdary of The Hindu found that the movie was Set for a decent run.Hans India gave a rating of 3 out of 5 stars and stated that the film was an entertainer and worth watching once.123telugu.com gave the film 3 out of 5 stars and stated that the film was Different Thriller.
