= Achari America Yatra =

2018 Indian film by G. Nageswara Reddy

- Theatrical release poster
- Directed by: G. Nageswara Reddy
- Screenplay by: G. Nageswara Reddy; Nivas; Varma; Vikram Raj; Gopal Krishna
- Story by: Murthi Malladi; Venkata Krishna
- Produced by: Kirthi Chowdary; Kittu
- Starring: Vishnu Manchu; Pragya Jaiswal; Brahmanandam
- Cinematography: Siddharth Ramaswamy
- Edited by: M. S. Rajashekhara Reddy (S. R. Shekhar)
- Music by: S. Thaman
- Release date: 27 April 2018
- Running time: 135 minutes
- Country: India
- Language: Telugu

Achari America Yatra (transl. "The Priest's Journey to America") is a 2018 Telugu action comedy film directed by G. Nageswara Reddy. The film stars Vishnu Manchu, Pragya Jaiswal, and Brahmanandam. It was produced by Kirthi Chowdary and Kittu.

== Plot ==
Kedari Krishnamachari (Vishnu Manchu) is a young pundit working under Applacharya (Brahmanandam), along with two other pundits. In the opening scene, they conduct a hawan at a rich household, where due to smoke, an elderly man dies, apparently due to asthma attack. The relatives blame the four pundits and go for their lives. They try taking refuge at a mosque and a church. When they find no other choice, Krishna insists on fleeing to America. Acharya reluctantly agrees after he reads Bhavishya vani that Krishna has tampered.

In America, they face the harsh realities, working odd jobs and living in a rented apartment. Krishna keeps searching for someone. Acharya manages to find a temple in Las Vegas, where he gets employed as a cleaner. There Krishna hears a female voice singing Krishna Bhajan and chases the singer. He sees a girl, Renuka (Pragya Jaiswal), leaving in a car and cheers, indicating this is the girl he had been looking for. In the temple, Acharya meets a woman (Surekha Vani), who says that her boss needs a pundit for his wedding. Acharya agrees.

They reach the home of the boss, Vikram alias Vicky (Thakur Anoop Singh), for conducting the engagement. There, they see Renuka and get shocked. Renuka sees Krishna and faints. A flashback starts.

Renuka arrives from America. Chakrapani (Kota Srinivasa Rao), who is a wheelchair user, is very happy. He says that she is the heiress of all his properties. Her uncles are angry because she refused to marry his son Vicky. There is a four day long pooja in the house, and Acharya is called for that. During that time, Krishna accidentally sees Renuka nude and later confesses and apologizes. Renuka gets angry. She and her friend (Vidyullekha Raman) plot revenge schemes that always fail. But she is impressed when Krishna blesses a maid's daughter for her birthday. Renuka takes Chakrapani for a stroll in the fields, when they are attacked. Krishna saves them. He suspects the uncles are behind the attack. Renuka and Krishna become closer. She says that on the final day of pooja she has some thing to say. The flashback ends.

Krishna tells Acharya and the pundits that Renuka left for America before the last day and he came to search for her. Renuka's friend Vidya tells them that Renuka had confessed to Chakrapani about her feelings for Krishna. Her uncles heard and abused Chakrapani & Renuka. Chakrapani died of a heart attack while Havan by remembering the insult done by Subbaraju & he saw Renuka being mistreated by her uncles and not for asthma. And then Pundits clarified about Chakrapani 's death that he didn't died due to havan smoke and original reason about Hearing truth about Subbaraju 's Conspiracy. After Chakrapani, died the uncles refused to give the ashes over to Renuka and said she had to marry Vicky to get them.

Krishna and the pundits make plans to steal the ashes from Vicky and flee with Renuka. When they manage after two tries, they are chased by Vicky's henchmen. They are accosted at an abandoned factory. The family lawyer (Posani Krishna Murali) tells Krishna to sign some papers. Everyone gets confused. The lawyer reveals that Chakrapani had made Krishna his heir before he died, and also leaves a video evidence. Krishna refuses and fight ensues, where he manages to subdue all others.

At the ending, Krishna and Renuka visit Kasi to fulfil Chakrapani's last wishes.

== Cast ==
- Vishnu Manchu as Krishnamachari Bhaktavatsalam
- Pragya Jaiswal as Devineni Renuka Devi
- Brahmanandam as Appalachari
- Pradeep Rawat as Kanakamela Subbaraju
- Thakur Anoop Singh as Vikram (Vicky)
- Kota Srinivasa Rao as Chakrapani (Retired Advocate)
- Posani Krishna Murali as Chakrapani's family lawyer and student
- Satya Krishnan as Devasena
- Prudhvi Raj as Padma Rao (Train Passenger)
- Vidyullekha Raman as Vidya, Renuka's friend
- Prabhas Sreenu as Srinivas Sharma
- Surekha Vani as Surekha (Vikram's P.A)
- Master Bharath as Train Passenger
- Praveen as Praveen Sharma
- Supreeth Reddy as Veeraraju
- M. S. Narayana as Padma Rao's Grandfather (portrait)
- Raja Ravindra as Subbaraju's Brother and Chakrapani's second son-in-law

== Soundtrack ==
Achari America Yatra

Soundtrack album by S. Thaman
- Released: 2018
- Genre: Feature film soundtrack

S. Thaman chronology
Gayatri (2018)	Achari America Yatra (2018)	Bhaagamathie (2018)

Song title	Singers
"Cheliya"	Achu Rajamani
"Aachari America Yatra"	Aditya Iyengar, Dhanunjay, Raghuram, Sony, Sri Krishna, Anurag Kulkarni, Ram Miriyala, Kaala Bhairava, Arun Kaundinya
"Swamy Ra Ra"	Dhanunjay, Mohana Bhogaraju, Sahithi Chaganti, and Sri Krishna
"Renuka"	Saketh Komanduri, Roshini

== Reception ==
The Hindu wrote that "Nageshwar Reddy had the premise with scope to be developed further, but Achari America Yatra is a lazy effort at whipping up some laughs". The Times of India gave the film a 1 out of 5 saying, "This Yatra [pilgrimage] will take the audience on a ride they wouldn't want to remember."
