= Kaalicharan =

2013 Telugu film

- Film poster
- Directed by: Sri Prawin
- Written by: Dialogues: Khaja; Shiva; Sri Prawin
- Produced by: Sri Prawin
- Starring: Chaitanya Krishna; Chandini Tamilarasan; Pankaj Kesari
- Cinematography: Viswa Devabatuula; Sathish Muthuyala
- Edited by: Prawin Pudi
- Music by: Nandan Raj
- Production company: Sri Karunalayam
- Distributed by: Baby Manaswini
- Release date: 8 November 2013
- Country: India
- Language: Telugu

Kaalicharan is a 2013 Indian Telugu-language political drama film that stars Chaitanya Krishna, Chandini Tamilarasan, and Pankaj Kesari. The film marks the Telugu debut of Tamilarasan and Kesari. The film was dubbed into Tamil as Por Kuthirai. Chaitanya Krishna won the Nandi Special Jury Award and Prawin Pudi won the Nandi Award for Best Editor.

== Cast ==
- Chaitanya Krishna as Kaalicharan
- Chandini Tamilarasan as Thirtha
- Pankaj Kesari as Pasupathy
- Kavitha Srinivasan as Pasupathy's mistress
- Nagineedu as Kaalicharan's father
- Rao Ramesh

== Production ==
The film is directed by Sri Prawin, a pupil of Ram Gopal Varma, who earlier made Gaayam 2 (2010). Kaali Charan stars Chaitanya Krishna and Chandini Tamilarasan in the lead roles while Bhojpuri actor Pankaj Kesari essays a negative role. The film is set in the 1980s and is based on the life of MLA Erra Satyam. The muhurat (launch) of the film took place in Hyderabad with Lakshmi Manchu, Allu Aravind, Tammareddy Bharadwaja, and Sundeep Kishan in attendance.

== Soundtrack ==
The songs are composed by Nandan Raj.

All lyrics are written by Vanamali, Sada Chandra.

No.	Title	Singer(s)	Length
1.	"Kurisikurisi"	Nandan Raj, Sri Krishna, Aparna	3:49
2.	"Mella Mellaga"	Nandan Raj, Vinay	4:19
3.	"Devudanna Peru"	Nandan Raj, Suresh Babu	2:35
4.	"Palike Aa Guvva"	Nandan Raj, Sri Krishna	4:08
5.	"Nakallu Chudu"	Nandan Raj, Geetha Madhuri	4:22
6.	"O Ningey Thuli Holi"	Nandan Raj, Ramki, Sahithi	4:13
7.	"Naa Ninnu"	Nandan Raj, Anjana Sowmya	4:07
Total length:			27:33

== Reception ==
The Times of India gave the film a rating of two out of five stars and wrote that "The problem you have with the movie is the director’s attempt to create suspense at some places. You feel cheated and taken for a ride". The Hindu wrote that "While it’s refreshing to see a filmmaker explore a new format and show courage in not introducing force-fit commercial elements, it’s a pity when a good attempt is letdown by tiresome narration".
