= Bham Bolenath =

- Theatrical poster
- Directed by: Karthik Varma Dandu
- Screenplay by: Karthik Varma Dandu
- Dialogues by: Karthik Varma Dandu; Sharan Koppisetty
- Story by: Karthik Varma Dandu
- Produced by: Siruvuri Rajesh Varma
- Starring: Navdeep; Pooja Jhaveri; Pradeep Machiraju; Naveen Chandra
- Cinematography: Bharani K. Dharan
- Edited by: Prawin Pudi
- Music by: Sai Karthik
- Production company: R. C. C. Entertainments
- Release date: 27 March 2015
- Country: India
- Language: Telugu
- Budget: ₹1.5 crore

Bham Bolenath is a 2015 Indian Telugu-language stoner-comedy film directed by Karthik Varma Dandu and produced by Siruvuri Rajesh Varma under R.C.C Entertainments. It stars Navdeep, Pooja Jhaveri, Naveen Chandra, Pradeep Machiraju, and Kireeti Damaraju. The film was released on 27 February 2015. It received mixed reviews from critics.

== Cast ==
- Navdeep as Vishnu
- Pooja Jhaveri as Sri Lakshmi / Neel
- Naveen Chandra as Krishna
- Pradeep Machiraju as Rocky
- Posani Krishna Murali as Sethji
- Kireeti Damaraju as Roshan
- Thagubothu Ramesh
- Praveen as Krishna's friend
- Fish Venkat
- Pankaj Kesari as Vasool Raja
- Naveen Neni
- Prudhvi Raj as police officer
- Rajitha

== Soundtrack ==
The music was composed by Sai Karthik and released by Tanmayi Music.

Bham Bolenath

Soundtrack album by Sai Karthik
- Released: Dec 6, 2014
- Recorded: 2014
- Genre: Soundtrack
- Length: 15:14
- Label: Tanmayi Music
- Producer: Sai Karthik

Sai Karthik chronology
Asura (2015)	Bham Bolenath (2014)	Super Star Kidnap (2015)

Track list
No.	Title	Lyrics	Singer(s)	Length
1.	"Bham Bolenath"	B. Subbaraya Sharma	Siddharth Watkins	3:05
2.	"Manase"	Balaji	Haricharan, Saindhavi	4:05
3.	"Unnodaina"	B. Subbaraya Sharma	Ranjith	3:32
4.	"Once Upon A Time"	Krishna Chaitanya	N. C. Karunya, Suchitra	2:24
5.	"Setugar"	Balaji	N. C. Karunya, Suchitra	2:08
Total length:				15:14
