= Surbhi =

Indian actress

- Born: Surbhi Puranik; 5 June, 1993; Delhi, India
- Other name: Surabhi
- Occupations: Actress; model
- Years active: 2013–present

Surbhi Puranik (born 5 June 1993), professionally known as Surbhi, is an Indian actress who primarily works in Telugu and Tamil films. She made her film debut with the Tamil film Ivan Veramathiri (2013), for which she received SIIMA Award for Best Female Debut - Tamil and Vijay Award for Best Debut Actress nominations.

Surbhi made her Telugu film debut with Beeruva (2015). She has been part of successful films including Express Raja and Gentleman both (2016). She made her Kannada film debut with Sakath (2021).

== Early life ==
Surbhi was born as Surbhi Puranik on 5 June 1993 in Delhi. She completed her bachelor's degree in Fine Arts from the College of Art, Delhi. Surbhi took up an acting course at Imago Acting School, where she was taught by Barry John and Manoj Bajpai. She then did various modelling assignment before her film debut.

== Career ==
=== Debut and early success (2013-2018) ===
Surbhi made her acting debut in 2013 with Ivan Veramathiri. She portrayed a college student opposite Vikram Prabhu in this successful film. Rediff.com wrote, "Surabhi is perfectly cast. She brightens up all the scenes she appears in and seems totally natural and fresh." Hindustan Times said, "Debutant Surabhi can be impressive with some guidance." She received SIIMA Award for Best Female Debut - Tamil and Vijay Award for Best Debut Actress nominations for her performance.

In 2014, she first appeared in Velaiyilla Pattathari alongside Dhanush. It was one of the most successful Tamil films of the year. Deccan Chronicle noted, "Surabhi in cameo fits the bill." She next appeared in a cameo in Jeeva. In 2015, she made her Telugu debut and appeared opposite Sundeep Kishan in Beeruva. Times of India wrote, "Surbhi is good in her role but she could have worked better in the drunk scene."

Surbhi had four releases in 2016. Firstly, she portrayed a dog lover opposite Sharwanand in Express Raja. It was a commercial success. The Hindu noted, "Surbhi looks pretty. Though she has a small role she does her part well." Next, she appeared opposite Jai in Pugazh, a box office average. She then appeared in Attack opposite Manchu Manoj. Her final release of the year came with Gentleman opposite Nani, portraying a young entrepreneur. It become a commercial success at the box office. Firstpost noted, "Surabhi as Aishwarya is simple and naïve, like the character demands." While Deccan Chronicle wrote, "Surabhi looks good on screen and has done her job very well."

She appeared opposite Allu Sirish in her only release of 2017, Okka Kshanam. Firstpost mentioned, "Surbhi, as Allu Sirish's love, fits her role to the T."

=== Further career and recent work (2019-present) ===
Surbhi portrayed the lead opposite Vishnu Manchu in the 2019 film Voter. 123 Telugu wrote, "Surabhi looks glamorous and her chemistry with Vishnu Manchu is good too."

Surbhi had two release in 2021. She first portrayed the titular role opposite Aadi in Sashi. Times of India wrote, "Surabhi looked good on screen but could have been more expressive." Surbhi next made her Kannada film debut with Sakath. She portrayed an anchor alongside Ganesh. Times of India stated, "Surbhi is charming in her debut outing."

After a small hiatus, Surbhi played Sofia in DD Returns alongside Santhanam. Times of India stated, "Surbhi along with the other cast members, has played her part to perfection."

== Filmography ==
Key
†	Denotes films that have not yet been released

List of film credits
Year	Title	Role	Language	Notes	Ref.
2013	Ivan Veramathiri	Malini	Tamil	Debut film	
2014	Velaiilla Pattadhari	Anitha	Tamil	Cameo appearance	
2014	Jeeva	Herself	Tamil	Special appearance in song "Oruthi Mele"	
2015	Beeruva	Swathi Adikesavulu	Telugu	Telugu Debut	
2016	Express Raja	Amulya "Ammu"	Telugu		
2016	Pugazh	Bhuvana	Tamil		
2016	Attack	Valli	Telugu		
2016	Gentleman	Aishwarya "Aishu"	Telugu		
2017	Okka Kshanam	Jyotsna "Jyo"	Telugu		
2019	Voter	Bhavana	Telugu		
2021	Sashi	Sashi	Telugu		
2021	Sakath	Mayuri	Kannada	Kannada Debut	
2023	DD Returns	Sofia	Tamil		
2026	Ramba Oorvasi Menaka †	TBA	Telugu	Post-production	
TBA	Vishwambhara †	TBA	Telugu	Post-production	

== Awards and nominations ==
List of awards and nominations received by Surbhi
Year	Award	Category	Film	Result	Ref.
2013	3rd South Indian International Movie Awards	Best Female Debut - Tamil	Ivan Veramathiri	Nominated	
2013	8th Vijay Awards	Best Debut Actress	Ivan Veramathiri	Nominated	
