= Fashion Designer s/o Ladies Tailor =

Film by Vamsy

- Theatrical release poster
- Directed by: Vamsy
- Written by: Vamsy
- Produced by: Madhura Sreedhar Reddy
- Starring: Sumanth Ashwin; Anisha Ambrose; Manali Rathod; Manasa Himavarsha
- Cinematography: Nagesh Banell
- Edited by: Basva Paidireddy
- Music by: Mani Sharma
- Production company: Madhura Entertainments
- Release date: 2 June 2017
- Running time: 130 minutes
- Country: India
- Language: Telugu

Fashion Designer s/o Ladies Tailor is a 2017 Indian Telugu-language romantic comedy film directed by Vamsy and starring Sumanth Ashwin, Anisha Ambrose, Manali Rathod, and Manasa Himavarsh. The film is a sequel to the director's own Ladies Tailor (1986).

== Cast ==
- Sumanth Ashwin as Gopalam
- Anisha Ambrose as Mahalakshmi
- Manali Rathod as Ammulu
- Manasa Himavarsha as Gedela Rani
- Krishna Bhagavan
- Krishnudu
- Ravi Varma Adduri
- Lakadi

== Release ==
The Hindu wrote that "Neither funny nor interesting, it is just a story stuck in a time warp". The Times of India gave the film a three out of five stars and wrote, "A loose-fitting film that lacks an engaging narration." 123 Telugu gave the film a rating of two-and-three-quarter out of five and wrote, "On the whole, Fashion Designer is a film which has the glimpse of trademark Vamsy in only a strict few scenes". Sify said, "Though the comedy and narration is in old style, this movie is better among Vamsy's recent movies."
