= Pragya Jaiswal =

Indian actress (born 1991)

- Jaiswal in 2025
- Born: 12 January 1991 (age 35); Jabalpur, Madhya Pradesh, India
- Education: Symbiosis Law School
- Occupation: Actress
- Years active: 2014–present

Pragya Jaiswal (born 12 January 1991) is an Indian actress who predominantly works in Telugu and Hindi films. Jaiswal has won several awards including a Filmfare Award and a SIIMA Award.

Jaiswal made her acting debut in 2014 with the Tamil-language film Virattu. She had her breakthrough with the Telugu period drama Kanche (2015), for which she was awarded the Filmfare Award for Best Female Debut – South. She appeared in films such as Nakshatram (2017), Achari America Yatra (2018) and Akhanda (2021), which is her highest-grossing release.

== Early life ==
Jaiswal was born on 12 January 1991 in Jabalpur, Madhya Pradesh, India. Pragya Jaiswal completed her education from Symbiosis Law School at Pune. During her initial days at Symbiosis University, she participated in various beauty pageants and became a model. In 2014, she received the Symbiosis Sanskritik Puraskar for her achievement in the field of art and culture.

== Career ==
=== Early work (2014-2020) ===
Jaiswal made her acting debut with the Tamil film Virattu, in 2014.

In 2015, Jaiswal ventured into Telugu films with Mirchi Lanti Kurradu opposite Abijeet. Her career marked a turning point with Kanche, where she played a princess opposite Varun Tej. The film emerged a commercial success. Suresh Kavirayani of Deccan Chronicle noted, "Pragya looks beautiful and perfectly fits her role of a princess."

Following Kanche's success, she had four releases in 2017. She first appeared in Om Namo Venkatesaya, a box office failure. Her next film, Gunturodu opposite Manchu Manoj also failed at the box office. Jaiswal next played an IPS officer in Nakshatram. Sridhar Adivi of The Times of India stated that her role is packed with both "glamour and substance". She had an extended cameo in Jaya Janaki Nayaka, her final film of the year. In 2018, she appeared in Achari America Yatra opposite Vishnu Manchu, which was an average grosser.

=== Career progression (2021-present) ===
In 2021, Jaiswal played an IAS officer in Akhanda opposite Nandamuri Balakrishna. The film was a commercial success and became the third highest grossing Telugu film of 2021. Firstpost noted, "Saranya is relatively well-written and Pragya carries her well." In 2022, she played a NIA officer in the box office failure, Son of India.

Jaiswal returned to Hindi films with the 2024 Akshay Kumar starrer ensemble comedy Khel Khel Mein, playing a boutique owner opposite Aditya Seal. Anuj Kumar of The Hindu stated, "A confident Pragya turns up in a Hindi film for a change and plays the role of an entitled brat without caricaturising it." Jaiswal played a deputy engineer in the 2025 film Daaku Maharaaj, reuniting with Nandamuri Balakrishna. Janani K of India Today stated, "Pragya had an impactful role, but she just vanished towards the end." The film underperformed commercially.

== Filmography ==
=== Films ===
Key
†	Denotes films that have not yet been released

Year	Title	Role(s)	Language	Notes	Ref.
2014	Virattu	Mavi	Tamil		
2014	Titoo MBA	Gulshan	Hindi		
2015	Mirchi Lanti Kurradu	Vasundara	Telugu		
2015	Kanche	Sita Devi	Telugu		
2017	Om Namo Venkatesaya	Bhavani	Telugu		
2017	Gunturodu	Amrutha	Telugu		
2017	Nakshatram	Kiran Reddy IPS	Telugu		
2017	Jaya Janaki Nayaka	Falguni	Telugu		
2018	Achari America Yatra	Renuka	Telugu		
2021	Akhanda	Saranya Bachupally IAS	Telugu		
2022	Son of India	Iravathi "Ira"	Telugu		
2024	Khel Khel Mein	Naina Tanwar	Hindi		
2025	Daaku Maharaaj	Kaveri	Telugu		
2025	Akhanda 2: Thaandavam	Sharanya Murali Krishna	Telugu	Photo achieve	
2026	Suryaa: Ant Se Aarambh Tak†	TBA	Hindi	Post-production	
TBA	Tyson Naidu†	TBA	Telugu	Completed	

=== Music video ===
Year	Title	Singer(s)	Language	Ref.
2022	"Main Chala"	Guru Randhawa, Iulia Vantur	Hindi	

== Awards and nominations ==
Year	Work	Award	Category	Result	Ref.
2016	Kanche	63rd Filmfare Awards South	Best Female Debut	Won	
2016	Kanche	5th South Indian International Movie Awards	Best Female Debut – Telugu	Won	
2016	Kanche	CineMAA Awards	Best Female Debut	Won	
2016	Kanche	Zee Telugu Apsara Awards	Best Find of the Year	Won	
2016	Kanche	TV9 National Film Awards	Best Debut Actress	Won	
2017	Kanche	IIFA Utsavam	Best Performance in a Leading Role Female – Telugu	Nominated	
2021	Akhanda	10th South Indian International Movie Awards	Best Actress – Telugu	Nominated	
2025	-	Iconic Gold Awards	Fresh Face In Bollywood	Won	
2025	-	Filmfare Galmour & Style Awards South	Fit and Fabulous	Won	
