= Okkadu Migiladu =

- Theatrical release poster
- Directed by: Ajay Andrews Nuthakki
- Written by: Ajay Andrews Nuthakki; Gopi Mohan
- Produced by: S. N. Reddy; Laxmi Kanth nadendla
- Starring: Manchu Manoj; Anisha Ambrose; Ajay Andrews Nuthakki
- Cinematography: V. K. Ramaraju
- Edited by: Karthika Srinivas
- Music by: Siva R. Nandigam
- Production company: Padmaja Films India
- Release date: 10 November 2017
- Running time: 141 minutes
- Country: India
- Language: Telugu

Okkadu Migiladu is a 2017 Indian Telugu-language war drama film directed by Ajay Andrews Nuthakki. The film stars Manchu Manoj, Anisha Ambrose, and Nuthakki.

== Plot ==
The film revolves around the character Surya, portrayed by Manchu Manoj, who is a student leader in India. The film begins with Surya leading a protest against the rape and murder of three female students, two of whom are Sri Lankan refugees. This activism leads to his arrest on fabricated drug charges by a corrupt politician, highlighting themes of injustice and the plight of refugees. Surya's backstory is tied to the Sri Lankan civil war, where his family suffered, setting the stage for his relentless fight against oppression.

The film then shifts to a flashback, where Manoj also plays Peter, a character inspired by the LTTE leader Velupillai Prabhakaran. This part of the narrative focuses on the harsh realities faced by Tamil civilians in Sri Lanka, depicting the brutalities of war and the desperate escape of refugees by sea. A significant portion of the movie shows these refugees, including Peter, on a boat lost in the ocean without essential supplies for 10 days, attempting to reach India. Despite the noble intentions to address the refugee crisis and human rights abuses, the film has been criticized for its heavy-handed melodrama, inconsistent storytelling, and an overemphasis on graphic violence, which somewhat dilutes the emotional impact of the story.

== Cast ==
- Manchu Manoj as Surya and Peter
- Anisha Ambrose as Swarna
- Ajay Andrews Nuthakki as Victor
- Milind Gunaji as Education Minister
- Posani Krishna Murali as Shiva
- Suhasini Maniratnam
- Murali Mohan

== Release and reception ==
Neeshita Nyayapati of The Times of India gave the film a rating of two out of five stars and wrote that: "There are very few scenes in the film that manage to evoke any kind of emotion from the audience, despite the whole film relying on a heavy dose of melodrama". The Hindu critic Sangeetha Devi Dundoo stated that the filmmaking was a huge let-down. "It’s tiresome to sit through the melodrama, over-the-top acting by some of the cast, cinematography that’s often in a state of shaky movement, and some lecturing on human survival against divisive forces," she added. Hemanth Kumar writing for Firstpost gave the film a rating of two out of five and noted that: "This is a painful film, both for the characters in the story and also those who watch it. Two big thumbs down". The film’s Tamil version titled Naan Thirimba Varuven was released in 2017.
