= Kotha Janta =

- Movie Poster
- Directed by: Maruthi
- Written by: Maruthi
- Produced by: Bunny Vasu
- Starring: Allu Sirish; Regina Cassandra
- Cinematography: Richard Prasad
- Edited by: S. B. Uddhav
- Music by: Jeevan Babu
- Production company: Geetha Arts
- Release date: 3 May 2014
- Country: India
- Language: Telugu
- Box office: ₹7.5 crore distributors' share

Kotha Janta (English: New Pair) is a 2014 Indian Telugu-language comedy drama film directed by Maruthi and produced by Bunny Vasu through Geetha Arts Banner. It stars Allu Sirish and Regina Cassandra in the lead roles. The film released on 3 May 2014 to mixed reviews from critics but was a commercial success at the box office.

== Plot ==
Sirish (Allu Sirish) is a selfish guy and does anything for money. Suvarna (Regina Cassandra) is a practical girl who is fond of making money. Both of them are summoned to work together in a TV channel in Hyderabad. Their target is to take that sinking channel to the top. They start a new program called Kotha Janta where they marry off couples who are caught in strange situations. After marrying off the first couple, they realise that the girl belongs to a powerful politician's family. Sirish and Suvarna start having differences as the politician chase them. The rest of the story is all about how they realize that they are made for each other.

== Cast ==
- Allu Sirish as Sirish
- Regina Cassandra as Suvarna
- Madhunandan as Madhu
- Nyra Banerjee as Pentamma
- Saptagiri as Giri
- Saikumar Pampana as Sai
- Posani Krishna Murali
- Rao Ramesh as Y TV Chairman Ramesh
- Sundaram Master as Suvarna's grandfather
- Y. Kasi Viswanath as Suvarna's father
- Rohini as Sirish's mother
- Sruthi as Bebakka
- Ahuti Prasad as Politician
- Prabhas Sreenu
- Josh Ravi as Ravi
- Satyam Rajesh as background dancer

== Production ==
In November 2013 a song, the remixed version of the Chiranjeevi's, "Atu Amalapuram", from the film, Khaidi No.786, was filmed on Sirish and Madhurima, at a specially erected set in a private studio.

== Soundtrack ==
The music was composed by Jeevan Babu and released under Aditya Music.

Kotha Janta

Soundtrack album by Jeevan Babu
- Released: April 5, 2014
- Recorded: 2014
- Genre: Soundtrack
- Length: 25:09
- Label: Aditya Music
- Producer: Jeevan Babu

Jeevan Babu chronology
Chandralekha (2014)	Kotha Janta (2014)	Kaai Raja Kaai (2015)

Track list
No.	Title	Lyrics	Singer(s)	Length
1.	"Charminar Galli"	Ramajogayya Sastry	Revanth, Sravani Vadlamani, Deepu	4:09
2.	"Arere Ani Pilupo"	Ramajogayya Sastry	Haricharan, Hymath	4:05
3.	"Atu Amalapuram" (Remix)	Bhuvana Chandra	Sahithi	3:56
4.	"Osi Prema Rakshasi"	Ramajogayya Sastry	Lipsika, Ramya Behara, Yamini	3:59
5.	"Kallalloki Kallupettestu"	Bhaskarabhatla Ravi Kumar	Rahul Sipligunj, Ramya Behara, Hymath, Divya	4:08
6.	"Gundello"	Sirivennela Seetharama Sastry	Haricharan	3:55
7.	"Anukonidhi"	Ramajogayya Sastry	Hymath	0:57
Total length:				25:09

== Critical reception ==
Jeevi of Idlebrain rated the film 3/5 and wrote, "The screenplay has to be watertight in films where the story runs of ego issues and confusion. [...] Director couldn’t handle the second half well." A critic from The Times of India gave it 2.5/5 stars and wrote, "Keeping pace with the movie is the music [...] Director Maruthi has a message to pass on to his viewers: help others. Don’t be driven by a selfish motive all the time. That makes it a meaningful movie." A critic from Deccan Chronicle wrote, "Though the film’s concept is good, the narration is slow and predictable. The climax is also not interesting and the film ends abruptly. [...] On the whole, Kotha Janta is not very impressive and is good only in parts."
