= Pooja Jhaveri =

Indian film actress

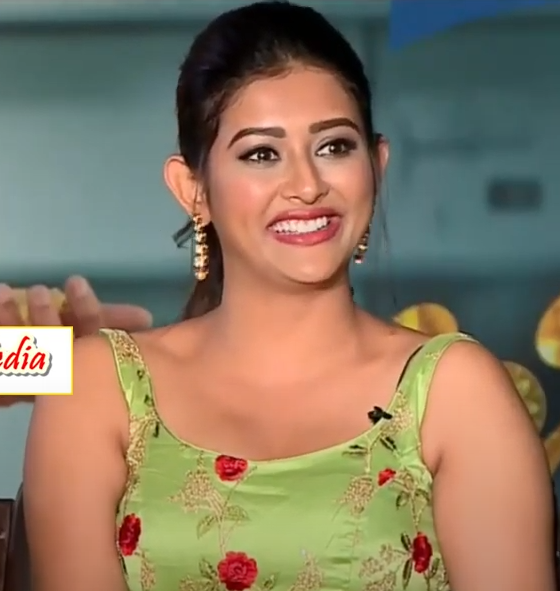
- Jhaveri in 2021
- Born: 1992 or 1993 (age 33–34); Valsad, Gujarat, India
- Occupation: Actress
- Years active: 2015–present

Pooja Jhaveri (born 1992/1993) is an Indian actress who appears in Telugu, Tamil and Gujarati films. She made her debut with the Telugu film Bham Bolenath in 2015.

== Personal life ==
Jhaveri was born into a Gujarati family in Valsad, Gujarat, where she was raised, and later moved with her family to Mumbai for her studies.

== Career ==
Jhaveri started her acting career in Telugu film industry with film Bham Bolenath in 2015, and then appeared in films like Right Right, a remake of Malayalam film Ordinary. She also appeared in Tamil films Thodari and Rukkumani Vandi Varudhu. Her latest Telugu film, Bangaru Bullodu released on 23 January 2021.

== Filmography ==
Year	Film	Role(s)	Language	Notes
2015	Bham Bolenath	Srilakshmi	Telugu	Telugu debut
2015	Shivam	Herself	Kannada	Special appearance in ''Alli Nodu'' song
2015	Jagannatakam	Herself	Telugu	Special appearance in ''Siripuram'' song
2016	Right Right	Kalyani	Telugu	
2016	L7	Sandhya & Nithya	Telugu	Dual role
2016	Thodari	Actress Sreesha	Tamil	Cameo appearance
2017	Dwaraka	Vasudha	Telugu	
2017	Yugapurusha	Unknown	Kannada	
2018	Touch Chesi Chudu	Sandhya	Telugu	
2019	Mister Kalaakar	Kinjal	Gujarati	Gujarati debut
2020	47 Days	Juliet	Telugu	Zee5 film
2021	Bangaru Bullodu	Boddu Kanaka Mahalakshmi	Telugu	
2022	Gajab Thai Gayo!	Vishwa	Gujarati	
2023	Mayagadu	Swetha	Telugu	Extended Cameo
2023	Echo	Diya	Tamil	
2023	21 Divas	Megha	Gujarati	
2024	Mix Up	Maithili	Telugu	Aha film
2025	Vande Bharat Via USA	Eva Mehta	Gujarati	
TBA	Address	TBA	Tamil	
