= Bangaru Bullodu (2021 film) =

2021 film by P. V. Giri

- Theatrical release poster
- Directed by: P. V. Giri
- Written by: Veligonda Srinivas
- Produced by: Sunkara Ramabrahmam; Ajay Sunkara
- Starring: Allari Naresh; Pooja Jhaveri
- Cinematography: Satish Mutyala
- Edited by: M. R. Varma
- Music by: Sai Karthik
- Production company: A. K. Entertainments
- Release date: 23 January 2021
- Country: India
- Language: Telugu

Bangaru Bullodu (transl. Golden Guy) is a 2021 Indian Telugu-language comedy film directed by P. V. Giri from a screenplay written by Veligonda Srinivas. Produced by Sunkara Ramabrahmam and Ajay Sunkara under the banner of AK Entertainments. The film features Allari Naresh and Pooja Jhaveri in the lead roles. The film was released on 23 January 2021.

== Plot ==
Bhavani Prasad comes from a well-respected family of goldsmiths. He works at a bank as a gold appraiser and sometimes helps his manager use the gold that customers deposited for their personal purposes. Bhavani lives with his grandfather and his two older brothers who are addicted to gambling and are good-for-nothing. Their village is famous for a very well-known deity, upon praying to the deity most of the bachelors/spinsters get married in a short time. One day upon learning that the government is soon going to take up the responsibilities of the temple, Bhavani's grandfather has a stroke. Upon recovering, he tells Bhavani the events that transpired twenty years ago.

When Bhavani's mother was pregnant with him, his grandfather and father were given the task of crafting jewels from the donations received through gold. While working on the project, Bhavani's parents meet with an accident. His grandfather, unable to pay the medical bills, pawns the gold received through donations and tries to save his son and daughter-in-law in vain. The doctors save Bhavani and his grandfather replaces the original jewels with worthless fake ones, and since he is a famous goldsmith none of the people suspect him. Unable to face the deity due to the fraud he committed, he doesn't step into the temple any more and wishes his grandson would correct his wrong before he dies.

Bhavani after learning this, uses his connections as a gold appraiser and withdraws the gold from Nagaraju's account who uses the money from the gold loan and lends it to people for high interest. They melt and craft new jewels, not expecting Nagaraju to withdraw the jewels. Nagaraju tries to withdraw his jewels due to his daughter's wedding proposals, but Bhavani foils all of them, and eventually falls in love with Mahalakshmi. After the jewels are ready, they plan to switch the fake with the original under the pretext of cleaning them. While the original would be at the deity the fake ones would be in the locker which Bhavani plans on restoring with an original and different set after getting some cash from their ancestral property in a few months.

The following day, they are shocked to learn that the fake jewels were robbed, making it impossible to make the switch. Through some evidence, the police inform everyone that a small-time crook has stolen these jewels and is working with a partner. His partner double-crosses him by making the original robber decoy. After Bhavani learns of this, they try to get the partner so they could make the switch, but the partner in a misunderstanding confesses to the police. It is later found out, that this heist was planned by a village elder.

Meanwhile, upon learning that Bhavani is using his gold appraiser connections for his profit and fooling everyone to get close to his daughter, Nagaraju publicly humiliates him and asks him to return his jewels deposited in the bank. Just as he is about to confess to the whole drama, the police arrest Nagaraju because the latter buys the jewels from the village elder without the knowledge that they belong to the deity.

Mahalakshmi decides to leave the house with her share of the property. When the police ask Nagaraju about the jewels, he shows them the note his daughter left him. Mahalakshmi then shows Bhavani that she left her house after taking the jewels, revealing the contents of the letter. Bhavani takes the jewels makes a switch with the original jewels he had all along and finally surrenders the original jewels to the police thereby fulfilling his grandfather's wish.

== Cast ==
- Allari Naresh as Bhavani Prasad
- Pooja Jhaveri as Boddu Kanaka Mahalakshmi
- Posani Krishna Murali as Boddu Nagaraju
- Ajay Ghosh as Police Inspector
- Vennela Kishore as Mahalakshmi's fiancé
- Tanikella Bharani as Bhavani's grandfather
- Prabhas Sreenu as Bhavani's first brother
- Satyam Rajesh as Bhavani's second brother
- Prudhvi Raj as Bank Manager
- Praveen as Bank Employee
- Rajitha as Posani's wife
- Bhadram as Posani's assistant
- Jabardasth Mahesh as Tanikella Bharani's assistant
- Ananth Babu as Marriage Broker
- Rama Prabha as Tea vendor
- Ramapatra Nitra Veligonda Srinivas
- Saarika Ramachandra Rao

== Release ==
The film was released on 23 January 2021

Home media

The film is streaming now on Sun NXT

== Reception ==
Sangeetha Devi in her review for The Hindu, called it an "Unappealing gold rush". She felt that the film's premise got squandered by cringe-inducing comedy." The Times of India critic Thadhagath Pathi rated 2 out of 5 stars, and stated: "Bangaru Bullodu has a story that has potential but reels under the weight of a lot of nonsensical elements." A reviewer from Sakshi opined that except the climax, the film has routine storyline. In addition, it has failed to generate any humour.
