= Son of India (2022 film) =

2022 Indian film by Diamond Ratnababu

- First Look Poster
- Directed by: Diamond Ratnababu
- Written by: Diamond Ratnababu
- Produced by: Vishnu Manchu
- Starring: Mohan Babu; Meena; Srikanth; Pragya Jaiswal
- Cinematography: Sarvesh Murari
- Edited by: Gautham Raju
- Music by: Ilaiyaraaja
- Production companies: 24 Frames Factory; Sree Lakshmi Prasanna Pictures
- Release date: 18 February 2022
- Country: India
- Language: Telugu

Son of India is a 2022 Indian Telugu-language action drama film written and directed by Diamond Ratnababu, and produced by Vishnu Manchu under the banner of Sree Lakshmi Prasanna Pictures and 24 Frames Factory. The film stars Mohan Babu, Meena, Srikanth, and Pragya Jaiswal. The film was released theatrically on 18 February 2022 to a highly negative reception and was box-office bomb.

== Plot ==
The film follows the story of Virupaksha (Mohan Babu), a man with a mysterious past who embarks on a mission to expose corruption and seek justice. As a series of high-profile kidnappings shock the nation, the government and intelligence agencies struggle to find the culprit.

Virupaksha, who initially appears to be a common man, is later revealed to have a deep connection to these events. His past unfolds, showing his tragic personal loss due to corrupt politicians and powerful figures. Using his intelligence and strategic planning, he executes a vigilante mission, targeting those responsible for injustice in society.

As the media and public react to the unfolding events, Virupaksha gains both support and opposition, with some viewing him as a hero while others label him a dangerous criminal. The Chief Minister, feeling the pressure, deploys his most trusted officials to track him down, leading to a high-stakes game of cat and mouse. As the final pieces of his plan come together, Virupaksha reveals damning evidence against the corrupt elite, shaking the foundations of the political system. The film culminates in an intense showdown where he must decide whether to continue his fight for justice or make the ultimate sacrifice to prove his point.

As the investigation intensifies, the authorities race against time to uncover Virupaksha’s motives and stop his actions. Flashbacks reveal his painful past, where he once served the system with integrity but suffered personal losses due to political conspiracies and corruption. With each kidnapping, he forces the powerful to confront their misdeeds, exposing their crimes to the public. In a tense climax, his final confrontation with the Chief Minister unveils shocking truths, leading to a thought-provoking conclusion about justice and morality. Whether Virupaksha achieves his ultimate goal or falls victim to the system he fights against forms the crux of the story.

== Cast ==
- Mohan Babu as Virupaksha
- Meena as Dakshayani
- Srikanth as Central Minister Mahendra Bhupati
- Pragya Jaiswal as NIA officer Airavathi
- Tanikella Bharani as Home Minister
- Ali as TV5 News reporter
- Vennela Kishore as Kishore
- Prudhvi Raj
- Raghu Babu
- Sunil as NTV News reporter
- Raja Ravindra as Bhagavan Prasad
- Ravi Prakash
- Bandla Ganesh
- Naresh
- Posani Krishna Murali as an MLA
- Rajeev Kanakala
- Mangli
- Chiranjeevi (voiceover)

== Music ==
The first single, a devotional song, composed by Ilaiyaraaja was released on 15 June 2021.

== Production and release ==
The film began its production in October 2020 in Hyderabad. Initially the makers wanted to finalize the deal with an OTT platform but it didn't materialize. The film was then released on 18 February 2022 with a pre-release event held at Hyderabad. The film's digital distribution rights were brought by Amazon Prime Video, and it premiered on May 17, 2022.

== Critical reception ==
The film received negative reviews from critics. A reviewer from Eenadu reviewed the film and called it Mohan Babu's "one man show". Surya Prakash from Asianet News gave 2/5 rating and wrote Mohan Babu did an experiment at this age with the movie. Thadhagath Pathi of The Times of India gave the film a rating of 1.5 out of 5 and wrote "Son of India has a short run-time but the film feels stretched despite that. It’s not a theatrical experience everyone is longing for".

Sangeetha Devi Dundoo of The Hindu stated "An amateurish narration of an outdated story makes ‘Son of India’ an excruciating watch".
