= Dwaraka (film) =

2017 Indian film by Srinivas Ravindra

- Poster
- Directed by: Srinivas Ravindra
- Produced by: Pradyumna Chandrapati; Ganesh Penubotu
- Starring: Vijay Deverakonda; Pooja Jhaveri; Prakash Raj; Prudhviraj; Murali Sharma
- Cinematography: Shyam K. Naidu
- Edited by: Varshith Kaki
- Music by: Sai Karthik
- Production company: Legend Cinema
- Distributed by: Super Good Films
- Release date: 3 March 2017
- Country: India
- Language: Telugu

Dwaraka is a 2017 Indian Telugu-language romantic drama film directed by Srinivas Ravindra (MSR) (in his directorial debut) produced by Pradyumna Chandrapati and Ganesh Penubotu, under Legend Cinema, and is presented by R. B. Choudary under the banner Super Good Films. It features Vijay Deverakonda and Pooja Jhaveri in the lead roles while Prakash Raj, Prudhviraj and Murali Sharma appear in crucial roles.

Delayed initially due to the demonetisation, the film was released on March 3, 2017.

== Plot ==
The story is about a thief Erra Srinu who turns into a fake godman due to circumstances, how is his image exploited, his love story with Vasudha and his fight with Chaitanya, a rationalist who wants to expose him and how he comes clean forms the rest of the story.

== Cast ==
- Vijay Deverakonda as Erra Srinu aka Sri Krishnananda Swamy
- Pooja Jhaveri as Vasudha
- Murali Sharma as Chaitanya, a former IAS turned rationalist who targets Krishnananda Swamy to expose later, joins him and tries to expose the conspiracy behind him.
- Prabhakar as Adv. Ravi, an arrogant, witty lawyer who makes Erra Srinu into Krishnananda Swamy.
- Prakash Raj as Chief Minister (in an extended cameo appearance)
- Prudhviraj as Priest
- Surekha Vani as Vasudha's mother
- Raghu Babu as Minister, who is a partner of Ravi.
- Krishna Bhagavaan as a fake Baba exposed by Chaitanya (cameo appearance)
- Gundu Sudarshan as Sudarshan
- Uttej as Journalist Gopi
- Vajja Venkata Giridhar as Giri
- Sudharshan as Oscar
- Shakalaka Shankar
- Rupa Lakshmi
- Niharica Raizada in a special appearance in the song "Alabbi Alabbi"

== Soundtrack ==
The soundtrack was released by Aditya Music in October 2016. Music is composed by Sai Karthik.

Dwaraka

Soundtrack album by Sai Karthik
- Released: 2016
- Recorded: 2016
- Genre: Soundtrack
- Length: 17:41
- Label: Aditya Music
- Producer: Sai Karthik

Sai Karthik chronology
Shankara (2016)	Dwaraka (2016)	Intlo Deyyam Nakem Bhayam (2016)

Track list
No.	Title	Lyrics	Singer(s)	Length
1.	"Bhajare Nandagopala"	Sri Sai Kiran	K. S. Chithra	04:02
2.	"Adire Dada"	Rahman	Sai Charan	03:36
3.	"Jantar Mantar"	Rahman	Saketh	02:28
4.	"Allabbi Allabbi"	Kasarla Shyam	Revanth, Divija Karthik	03:24
5.	"Enta Chitram"	Rahman	Sameera Bharadwaj	04:11
Total length:				17:41

== Reception ==
A critic from The Hindu wrote that "With a predictable storyline there is nothing in the film that keeps you amused or engaged. Dwaraka disappoints". A critic from The Times of India rated the film two and a half out of five and wrote that "Dwaraka has an interesting plotline and a tiringly erratic screenplay. It is almost engaging. You’ll want to see what happens of this thief who is given such a position of power. But only if you can sit through the two and a half hour of randomness". Suhas Yellapantula from The New Indian Express stated "For all its flaws, Dwaraka veers away from the infamous Telugu template and offers something for the viewers to think about. For this alone, it can be worth a watch". Varaprasad Makireddy from Samayam Telugu rated the film three out of five stars and opined, "In terms of story, there is no variety but the story is impressive. Thief Sheenu.. The sequence of becoming Baba.. The stunts performed by Baba.. Superstitious devotion.. The media frenzy.. The movie moves smartly with these scenes".
