= Anisha Ambrose =

Indian actress

- Born: Visakhapatnam, Andhra Pradesh, India
- Education: Gandhi Institute of Technology and Management
- Occupations: Actress, model
- Years active: 2013–2019
- Spouse: Gunanath Jakka (m. 2019)
- Children: 2

Anisha Ambrose is an Indian actress and model who appears in Telugu, Kannada and Tamil films. In 2013, she made her debut with Alias Janaki.

== Early career ==
Anisha's parents are from Visakhapatnam and she grew up in Odisha. Her family runs several schools in Andhra Pradesh and Odisha. She pursued her education from St. Josephs College for Women in Visakhapatnam and completed her MBA in finance at GITAM School of International Business.

She modelled for a friend's photography page on Facebook and her pictures were noticed by producer Neelima Tirumalasetti, from where her film career started.

== Personal life ==
Ambrose married Hyderabad-based entrepreneur Gunanath Jakka in May 2019 and subsequently quit acting. The couple had a child in 2020.

== Filmography ==
- All films are in Telugu, unless otherwise noted.

Year	Title	Role	Language	Notes
2013	Alias Janaki	Chaitra	Telugu	
2013	Pawan Kalyan Premalo Padadu	Swetha	Telugu	Short film
2015	Gopala Gopala	Journalist	Telugu	Cameo appearance
2015	A 2nd Hand Lover	Anjali	Kannada	
2016	Run	Amulya	Telugu	
2016	Karvva	Amrutha	Kannada	Nominated: IIFA Best Actress
2016	Manamantha	Aira	Telugu	
2017	Fashion Designer s/o Ladies Tailor	Mahalakshmi	Telugu	
2017	Vunnadhi Okate Zindagi	Shreya	Telugu	Cameo appearance
2017	Okkadu Migiladu	Swarna	Telugu	
2018	Ee Nagaraniki Emaindi	Shirley	Telugu	
2018	Vanjagar Ulagam	Samyuktha	Tamil	
2019	Seven	Jenny	Telugu; Tamil	Bilingual film
2024	Viswam	Meera	Telugu	Cameo appearance
2026	ENE Repeat	Shirley	Telugu	
