= Okka Kshanam =

2017 science fiction action thriller film directed by Vi Anand

- Theatrical release poster
- Directed by: Vi Anand
- Screenplay by: Vi Anand
- Dialogues by: Abburi Ravi
- Story by: Vi Anand
- Produced by: Chakri Chigurupati; Razesh Danda
- Starring: Allu Sirish; Surbhi; Srinivas Avasarala; Seerat Kapoor
- Cinematography: Shyam K. Naidu
- Edited by: Chota K. Prasad
- Music by: Mani Sharma
- Production company: Lakshmi Narasimha Entertainments
- Release date: 28 December 2017
- Running time: 154 minutes
- Country: India
- Language: Telugu

Okka Kshanam (transl. One Second) is a 2017 Indian Telugu-language science fiction action thriller film directed by Vi Anand and produced by Chakri Chigurupati under Lakshmi Narasimha Entertainments banner. The film stars Allu Sirish, Surbhi, Srinivas Avasarala, and Seerat Kapoor. The film explores the concept of parallel life, where the protagonist fights against his own destiny, fate and time. It is heavily borrowed from Alfred Hitchcock's film Rear Window (1954). The cinematography was by Shyam K Naidu, while the music was composed by Mani Sharma.

Okka Kshanam was released worldwide on 28 December 2017 and received mixed reviews from critics and audience. The film was later dubbed and released in Hindi as Shoorveer 2 and in Malayalam as Parallel Crime.

== Plot ==
Jeeva (Allu Sirish) and Jyothsna (aka Jo, Surbhi) are a couple of young lovers. One day at Jo's house, they notice from the balcony that a couple living in the opposite apartment, Srinivas (Srinivas Avasarala) and Swathi (Seerat Kapoor), might be in a troubled relationship, as Srinivas appears to be abusive toward Swathi. Jo tries to call the police, but Jeeva insists on first finding out what is actually happening. In the following days, Jeeva follows Srinivas and befriends him.

After Jeeva and Srinivas grow close, Srinivas narrates his love story with his wife Swathi, which shocks Jeeva and Jo. Srinivas and Swathi's love story, including details such as where and why they met, is exactly the same as Jeeva and Jo's. Even more disturbing, as Srinivas continues his story beyond events that Jeeva and Jo have already experienced, those future events also begin to happen to them.

One day, they see Srinivas rushing Swathi to the hospital. Jeeva and Jo sneak into their apartment to find out more. Upon seeing Swathi's medical records, Jo is shocked to learn that her life experiences are also identical to Swathi's. They conduct online research into this series of coincidences and discover a (fictitious) phenomenon called "parallel life", in which two completely unrelated people, living in different times and locations, experience exactly the same life down to the smallest details. They approach a professor who studies this phenomenon. The professor confirms their suspicion and states that whatever happened to Swathi will also happen to Jo, and that trying to change destiny will not work, as the final outcome will remain the same.

Swathi is later found dead, and Srinivas is arrested as the prime suspect in her murder. Terrified, Jo breaks up with Jeeva, fearing that he will one day turn abusive and kill her, despite Jeeva's efforts to convince her otherwise. In search of a way to change their fate, Jeeva visits Srinivas in jail, who tells him that Swathi actually committed suicide:

Some time after Srinivas and Swathi got married, Swathi was involved in an accident. Her car crashed into an ambulance, killing five children inside, which left her traumatized and mentally disturbed. One day, when Srinivas was not home, Swathi killed herself.

At the same time, Jo sends a video to Jeeva apologizing. She says that instead of living without him or living with him knowing he might one day kill her, she chooses suicide. Jeeva rushes to Jo's house to stop her, only to find her safe and unharmed. She admits she tried to kill herself but did not have the courage. They reconcile. This leads Jeeva to suspect the true cause of Swathi's death, as he believes she too would not have had the courage to commit suicide.

Jeeva investigates Swathi's death and discovers that she was actually murdered, with Tarun, a hospital dean, possibly involved. Meanwhile, through Swathi's email records, Jo uncovers the truth: while admitted to Tarun's hospital, Swathi accidentally discovered that the five children she believed she had killed in the accident were already dead due to the hospital's negligence. The hospital had sent their bodies in an ambulance with faulty brakes so that their deaths could later be attributed to an accident. Swathi recorded a video statement revealing this and sent it to Srinivas, but before he could watch it, Tarun's men killed her.

Meanwhile, Tarun learns that Jo has uncovered the truth and sends his men to abduct her to a construction site. They inform Jeeva of her location, intending for him to come and attempt a rescue. Their plan is to kill Jo and frame Jeeva for her murder. Jeeva arrives in time and fights Tarun and his men. Jo's throat is slit, but Jeeva manages to kill Tarun and his entire gang before it is too late, ultimately saving Jo and defying destiny.

== Cast ==
- Allu Sirish as Jeeva
- Surbhi as Jyothsna 'Jyo'
- Srinivas Avasarala as Srinivas, Swathi's husband
- Seerat Kapoor as Swathi, Srinivas' wife
- Dasari Arun Kumar as Olympus Hospital MD, Dr. T. S. Tarun (dubbed by Hemachandra)
- Jayaprakash as Scientist
- Kasi Viswanath as Ramakrishna, Jeeva's father
- Rohini as Jeeva's mother
- Praveen as Paparao 'Puppy', Jo's brother-in-law
- Snigdha as Snigdha, Jo's friend
- Prabhas Sreenu as Dasari Raghavendra Rao, waiter and customer
- Satya as Satyam, a thief
- Chammak Chandra as the Traffic Police Officer

== Production ==
The film met with trouble for a brief period of time over the allegations that the film borrows the script from a Korean film titled Parallel Life. Another producer Anil Sunkara reportedly had already bought the remake rights of the same film for his next production venture, 2 Memiddaram. Prior to the release, it was assumed that the story line of Okka Kshanam closely followed the same plot; Sunkara allegedly filed a complaint against the makers with the film chamber. However, once the producer saw the film and understood the same and even wished the team good luck for release on his official Twitter page. Post release, it was cleared that Vi Anand’s story and the screenplay were original. The director was also unanimously appreciated for his screenwriting in the film.

== Soundtrack ==
Okka Kshanam

Soundtrack album by Mani Sharma
- Released: 2017
- Recorded: 2017
- Genre: Soundtrack
- Label: Lahari Music
- Producer: Mani Sharma

Mani Sharma chronology
| Balakrishnudu (2017) | Okka Kshanam (2017) | MLA (2018) |

Music was composed by Mani Sharma and was released on Lahari Music.

| No. | Title | Lyrics | Singer(s) | Length |
|---|---|---|---|---|
| 1. | "So Many So Many" | Vanamali | Anurag Kulkarni, Sahithi | 4:23 |
| 2. | "Gundello Sudulu" | Suresh Banisetti | Anurag Kulkarni, Dinker, Damini Bhatla | 4:09 |
| 3. | "Dillore" | Kasarla Shyam | Rahul Sipligunj, Keerthana Sharma | 3:22 |
| Total length: | | | | 11:54 |
