= Swamy Ra Ra =

2013 Telugu crime comedy film directed by Sudheer Varma

- Swamy Ra Ra poster
- Directed by: Sudheer Varma
- Written by: Sudheer Varma
- Produced by: Chakri Chigurupati
- Starring: Nikhil Siddharth; Swathi Reddy
- Cinematography: Richard Prasad
- Edited by: Karthika Srinivas
- Music by: Sunny M.R.
- Production company: Lakshmi Narasimha Entertainments
- Distributed by: Cinema5 (US)
- Release date: 23 March 2013
- Running time: 120 minutes
- Country: India
- Language: Telugu
- Budget: ₹3–4 crore
- Box office: ₹9 crores

Swamy Ra Ra is a 2013 Indian Telugu-language crime comedy film written and directed by Sudheer Varma in his directorial debut and produced by Chakri Chigurupati under Lakshmi Narasimha Entertainments. It stars Nikhil Siddharth and Swathi Reddy while Satya, Pooja Ramachandran and Ravi Babu play supporting roles. In the film, Surya, along with his pickpocket friends are chased by a dangerous goon as he wants to deliver a stolen golden Vinayaka idol to a minister.

The film was released on 23 March 2013, and became a sleeper hit at box office. It was considered as one of the "25 Greatest Telugu Films Of The Decade" by Film Companion and was remade in Kannada as Jamboo Savari (2014).

== Plot ==
A gold Vinayaka idol, which is also a priceless ancient treasure, is stolen from a temple and ends up on the black market. Gangster Durga Prasad (Ravi Babu) intends to buy it and gift it to a minister in exchange for protection for his crimes. Durga sends his henchman Giri (Ravi Varma) to complete the deal, but Giri kills the seller, takes the idol, and lies to Durga that someone else killed the seller and stole the idol before he arrived.

Surya (Nikhil Siddharth), Bhanu (Pooja Ramachandran), and Ravi (Satya) are a gang of thieves who make a living through theft. One day, Surya is caught by his target and, while fleeing, steals the scooter of Swati (Swati Reddy) to escape. Swati later spots Surya riding her stolen scooter and confronts him. Surya claims that he bought the scooter from a third person and was unaware that it was stolen. He returns the scooter to Swati. Unaware that Surya is a thief, Swati befriends him. Surya also lies to her that he works at HP as a software engineer. As they spend more time together, Surya falls in love with Swati.

Durga eventually discovers that Giri stole the idol and sends his men to capture him. While being cornered by Durga's men, Giri, in an attempt to avoid being caught red-handed with the idol in his possession, secretly slips it into Swati's handbag as she passes by. Later, Surya's friend, a little boy named Chotu, steals the idol from Swati's handbag and gives it to Surya. Unaware of its true value, Surya's gang sells it to a private collector named Shankar (Jeeva) for a low price.

Unable to endure the torture inflicted by Durga, who also threatens to kill his pregnant wife, Giri confesses the truth. Durga then goes after Swati to retrieve the idol. He arrives at Swati's house, where Surya and his gang are also present, and threatens them at gunpoint to return the idol. All of them deny any knowledge of the idol before escaping.

Shankar sells the idol to two Nigerians for Rs 10 crore. The payment is represented by a symbolic Rs 10 note, through which Shankar can later withdraw the full amount at a designated shop. Dissatisfied with the small commission he receives from such a large deal, Shankar's assistant contacts Surya and conspires with him to steal the Rs 10 note. Surya agrees, and his gang successfully steals the note from Shankar. However, before Surya can withdraw the money, Durga calls him and reveals that he has kidnapped Swati. Durga demands that Surya return the idol within one hour or Swati will be killed.

To save Swati, Surya changes his plan. He contacts Shankar and demands the idol in exchange for the Rs 10 note. Shankar reveals the location of the two Nigerians. Surya's gang heads there to steal the idol, only to discover that Shankar's wife stole it moments earlier. Surya's gang chases her while also being pursued by the two Nigerians. During the chase, Surya's gang catches Shankar's wife and retrieves the idol from her. They then head to the location where Durga is holding Swati captive.

Surya hands the idol over to Durga and rescues Swati. The two Nigerians also arrive, followed by Shankar's assistant, the minister who has come to take the idol from Durga, and two assassins hired by the minister. A gunfight breaks out, killing everyone involved except Surya's gang and Swati, who manage to escape.

Swati reciprocates Surya's feelings. Surya reforms himself and begins studying to become a real software engineer at HP, hoping that Swati and her family will approve of their marriage.

== Cast ==
- Nikhil Siddharth as Surya
- Swati Reddy as Swati
- Ravi Babu as Durga Prasad
- Pooja Ramachandran as Bhanu
- Jeeva as Shankar
- Ravi Varma as Giri
- Praveen as Jogi
- Satya as Ravi
- Bhanu
- Jogi Krishnam Raju
- Jogi Naidu
- Master Sathwik as Chotu
- Murali Krishna
- Nara Rohit (narrator)

== Production ==
This is the second film from Lakshmi Narasimha Entertainments.

=== Casting ===
Nikhil plays the role of a pick-pocketer in this film. Nikhil mentioned in his Twitter that he is excited to work with actor Ravi Babu, who is playing a crucial role in the film.

=== Filming ===
The film started its regular shooting on 16 July 2012 at Attapur in Hyderabad. The 1st schedule of the film was completed on 7 August 2012 in the surroundings of Hyderabad. The 2nd schedule started on 22 August and was completed on 7 September 2012. A schedule was started in the surroundings of Hyderabad on 23 September 2012 it was continued to 6 October 2012. A 20-day schedule started on 14 October 2012. Some key scenes and songs were shot in Kerala and Tamil Nadu.

== Soundtrack ==
Swamy Ra Ra

Soundtrack album by Sunny M.R.
- Released: 23 January 2013
- Recorded: 2012–2013
- Genre: Film soundtrack
- Label: Saregama

Sunny M.R. chronology
Swamy Ra Ra (2013)	Uyyala Jampala (2013)

=== Launch ===
The audio was launched on 23 January 2013 at Taj Deccan in Hyderabad. It was attended by Nani, Srinivas Avasarala, Allari Naresh, Manoj Manchu, Nara Rohit, Sunil, Regina, Nandini Reddy, Mohan Krishna Indraganti and BVSN Prasad.

=== Track list ===
The film's music was composed by Sunny M.R. Musicperk.com rated the album 8/10, quoting "A fresh waft of cool music! Experimental Magic with simplicity".

All lyrics are written by Krishna Chaitanya.

No.	Title	Artist(s)	Length
1.	"Life Ante"	Shefali Alvares, Benny Dayal	04:02
2.	"Yo Yo Yo Memu Antha"	Nikhil Siddharth, Swati Reddy	03:30
3.	"Krishnudike Idhi Vintha"	Arijit Singh	03:30
4.	"Adi Enti Okkasari"	Arijit Singh	04:49
5.	"Edu Vaadu Evado Ledu"	Arjit Singh	04:20
6.	"Swamy Ra Ra (Reload)"	Sunny	02:27

== Release ==
The film was given 'U/A' certificate. It was released on 23 March 2013. Cinema5, a subsidiary of TV5, distributed the film in the United States.

== Reception ==
Swamy Ra Ra received positive reviews from critics.

Jeevi of Idlebrain gave 3.25 out of 5 stars and wrote Swamy Ra Ra is a class crime comedy. And you can watch it. Oneindia gave 3 out of 5 stars and states that Nikhil's action is one of the biggest plus points for the film. Sify gave 3 out of 5 stars and wrote Swamy Ra Ra has many positives to talk about: stylized narration, some interesting sequences and the superb music. Karthik Pasupulate of The Times of India gave 3.5 out of 5 stars and stated it all you feel like you seen some cinema and not some mish mashed formula package. The Hindu wrote "The film will pick-pocket your brain and you'll most probably end up feeling richer, if not a millionaire."

== Awards and nominations ==
Ceremony	Category	Nominee	Result	Ref.
61st Filmfare Awards South	Best Music Director - Telugu	M. R. Sunny	Nominated	

== Legacy ==
After the success of the film, Nikhil Siddharth and Swathi Reddy starred in Karthikeya (2014).
