= Gunturodu =

2017 Indian film by S. K. Satya

- Theatrical release poster
- Directed by: S. K. Satya
- Written by: S. K. Satya
- Produced by: Sree Varun Atluri
- Starring: Manchu Manoj; Pragya Jaiswal
- Narrated by: Chiranjeevi
- Cinematography: Siddharth Ramaswamy
- Edited by: Karthika Srinivas
- Music by: DJ Vasanth
- Production companies: Claps & Whistles Entertainments
- Release date: 3 March 2017
- Running time: 137 mins
- Country: India
- Language: Telugu

Gunturodu (transl. Guntur fellow) is a 2017 Telugu-language action comedy film directed by S.K. Satya. Starring Manchu Manoj, Pragya Jaiswal and music composed by DJ Vasanth. It released on 3 March 2017 to highly negative reviews and bombed at the box office.

== Cast ==
- Manchu Manoj as Kanna
- Pragya Jaiswal as Amrutha
- Rajendra Prasad as Suryanarayana
- Sampath Raj as Criminal Lawyer Seshu
- Kota Srinivasa Rao as MLA Koteswara Rao
- Rao Ramesh as Minister Krishna Rao
- Prudhviraj as Babu Rao
- Kasi Viswanath as Suryanarayana's friend
- Praveen as Kanna's friend
- Satya as Kanna's friend
- Raja Ravindra as Inspector Ramesh
- Bhanu Sri as Amrutha's friend
- Shakalaka Shankar

== Soundtrack ==
Gunturodu

Film score by DJ Vasanth
- Released: 29 January 2017
- Recorded: 2016
- Genre: Soundtrack
- Length: 22:22
- Label: Mango Music
- Producer: DJ Vasanth

Music composed by DJ Vasanth. The music released on Mango Music Company. The audio launch function was held on 29 January 2017 at JRC Convention Center in Hyderabad.

No.	Title	Lyrics	Singer(s)	Length
1.	"Padhe Padhe (Duet)"	D. J. Vasanth	Yazin Nizar, Ramya Behara	4:04
2.	"Netthimeeda Pettukunta"	Bhaskarabhatla	Yazin Nizar	3:49
3.	"Kadhile Rangula Villura"	Ramajogayya Sastry	Vijay Yesudas	4:27
4.	"Dandanaka"	Ramajogayya Sastry	Anurag Kulkarni, Geetha Madhuri	4:10
5.	"Padhe Padhe (Solo)"	D. J. Vasanth	Ramya Behara	3:45
6.	"Gunturodu"	D. J. Vasanth	Theme Music	0:52
7.	"Gunturodu"	D. J. Vasanth	Dance Beat	1:15
Total length:				22:22

== Reception ==
A critic from Deccan Chronicle wrote that "Except for Manchu Manoj and Sampath's performances, there are no other redeeming factors". A critic from The Times of India wrote that "Watch the movie if you are a Manoj Manchu's fan. For others, the movie can be disappointing".
