= Nenjil Thunivirundhal =

2017 Indian film by Suseenthiran

- Poster of Tamil version
- Directed by: Suseenthiran
- Written by: Suseenthiran; Sathya
- Produced by: Antony Xavier; Chakri Chigurupati
- Starring: Sundeep Kishan; Vikranth; Mehreen Pirzada; Shathiga
- Cinematography: Laxman Kumar
- Edited by: Kasi Viswanathan
- Music by: D. Imman
- Production companies: Annai Film Factorie; Lakshmi Narasimha Entertainments
- Distributed by: Clap Board Production
- Release date: 10 November 2017
- Running time: 107 minutes
- Country: India
- Languages: Tamil; Telugu

Nenjil Thunivirundhal (transl. If You Dare) is a 2017 Indian action drama film written and directed by Suseenthiran. It is shot simultaneously in Tamil and Telugu languages, the latter titled C/O Surya. The film stars Sundeep Kishan, Mehreen Pirzada, Vikranth, and Shathiga with Soori, Satya, and Harish Uthaman also in pivotal roles. Featuring music composed by D. Imman, the venture began production in December 2016 and was released on 10 November 2017.

The film was dubbed into Hindi under the title of the Telugu version in 2018.

== Plot ==
Kumar (Surya in Telugu version) is a somewhat timid young man who, after losing his father to a negligent operation, takes care of his mother and his sister Anuradha, who is a medical student, by running a catering business. His best friend is Mahesh, who likes talking with his fists. Mahesh and Anu are secretly in love and hide it from Kumar / Surya because it would spoil their friendship. Durai Pandi (Sambasivudu in Telugu version) is an assassin whose modus operandi is to double-cross his clients and earn double the money for his kills. Ensuing circumstances seemingly make Mahesh the target of Durai Pandi. However, there is a twist, and whether the good guys and their dear ones survive against the powerful and ruthless enemy forms the rest of the screenplay.

== Cast ==
Cast (Tamil)	Cast (Telugu)	Role (Tamil)	Role (Telugu)
Sundeep Kishan		Kumar	Surya
Vikranth		Mahesh	Mahesh
Mehreen Pirzada		Janani	Janani
Shathiga		Anuradha	Anuradha
Soori	Satya	Ramesh	Ramesh
Appukutty	—	Kumar/Surya's friend	Kumar/Surya's friend
Harish Uthaman		Durai Pandi	Sambasivudu
Thulasi		Kumar's mother	Surya's mother
Aruldoss		Gang leader	Gang leader
Vinoth Kishan		Durai Pandi's henchmen	Sambasivudu's henchmen
Dileepan		Durai Pandi's henchmen	Sambasivudu's henchmen
Arjunan		Janani's lover	Janani's lover
T. Siva	Nagineedu	Krishnamurthy	Krishnamurthy
Poraali Dileepan	Praveen	Suicidal man	Suicidal man
Supergood Subramani	Gundu Sudarshan	Lecturer	Lecturer
Pradeep K. Vijayan		Techie	Techie
Cast (Telugu)		Role (Telugu)	
Dhanraj		Assistant to Gang Leader	Assistant to Gang Leader

== Production ==
In November 2016, Suseenthiran began working on an untitled film as director with Sundeep Kishan and Vikranth signed on to play lead roles. Initial reports suggested that the film would be a bilingual Tamil and Telugu venture, where Kishan would replace Vikranth in the Telugu version, but later both were included in the cast. Vikranth worked on the film alongside his commitments in Suseethiran's production venture Vennila Kabaddi Kuzhu 2 (2017) and Samuthirakani's action drama Thondan (2017). Harish Uthaman and Soori also joined the cast in November 2016. Sundeep Kishan reunited with Suseenthiran after a previous venture, the Telugu version of Jeeva (2014), had been shelved midst production. Actress Mehreen Pirzada was brought in to make her acting debut in Tamil films, and recruited a Tamil instructor to help her learn the language. Production began in December, and the film was shot across Chennai, Vishakapatnam, Nellore and Tirupathi. The film's initial title, Aram Seidhu Pazhagu, and first look poster were revealed to the media on 14 February 2017. When the title was changed to Nenjil Thunivirundhal, the team again released the first look with the new title. The team has wrapped up the filming in June 2017.

When speaking about the heroine's role in the film, the director Suseenthiran said, "usually my scripts will have importance for the role of female leads, but in this particular movie, Mehreen Pirzada is having a cliché role". Despite being a bilingual, the entire film in two languages was shot in 55 days.

== Soundtrack ==
Nenjil Thunivirundhal / C/O Surya

Soundtrack album by D. Imman
- Released: 5 October 2017
- Recorded: 2017
- Genre: Soundtrack
- Length: 24:05 / 24:08
- Language: Tamil / Telugu
- Label: Saregama
- Producer: D. Imman

D. Imman chronology
Ippadai Vellum (2017)	Nenjil Thunivirundhal / C/O Surya (2017)	Panjumittai (2018)

The film's music was composed by D. Imman, while the audio rights of the film were acquired by Saregama. The album was released on 5 October 2017 and featured five songs and two theme tracks.

Tamil
No.	Title	Lyrics	Singer(s)	Length
1.	"Yechacha Yechacha"	Vairamuthu	Jithin Raj	4:35
2.	"Rail Aaraaroo"	Yugabharathi	Pradeep Kumar, Shreya Ghoshal	4:57
3.	"Aram Seyya Virumbu"	Vairamuthu	Hariharan	4:06
4.	"Sophia"	Madhan Karky	Aditya Rao, Sharanya Gopinath	4:04
5.	"Aei Arakka"	Yugabharathi	Benny Dayal	3:36
6.	"Dark Rooster Theme" (Instrumental)			1:53
7.	"Badass Theme" (Instrumental)			0:54
Total length:				24:05

Telugu
No.	Title	Lyrics	Singer(s)	Length
1.	"Yechacha Yechacha"	Ramajogayya Sastry	Vedala Hemachandra	4:35
2.	"Mudalaothonda"	Ananta Sriram	Pradeep Kumar, Shreya Ghoshal	4:57
3.	"Sadaa Manchikoraku"	Ramajogayya Sastry	Hariharan	4:07
4.	"Takkari"	Sri Mani	Aditya Rao, Sharanya Gopinath	4:05
5.	"Rudrakshaa"	Suddala Ashok Teja	Benny Dayal	3:36
6.	"Dark Rooster Theme" (Instrumental)			1:53
7.	"Badass Theme" (Instrumental)			0:55
Total length:				24:08

== Reception ==
The Tamil version of the film opened to mixed reviews from critics. A critic from The Hindu wrote that Suseenthiran "is out-of-form in this action drama", while The New Indian Express wrote that the film was an "uninspired thriller" and that it "pretends to be an enterprising thriller, but what it actually is, is your garden-variety cliché-ridden film." In a more positive review, The Indian Express wrote the "movie is an average thriller". Sify.com called the film "entertaining", explaining that "the movie has a charming friendship angle, middle-class family issues, a social message and a deadly villain". Baradwaj Rangan of Film Companion wrote "The premise is similar to what the director handled to far better effect in Naan Mahaan Alla and Pandiya Naadu, where ordinary men found themselves in extraordinary circumstances. The story has terrific potential. (It's the tragedy with so many of our films: great story, lousy screenplay.)"

== Release ==
The makers originally planned to release the film in early October 2017 to coincide with Diwali, but postponed the release owing to the lack of available screens. The film garnered a poor commercial response at the Chennai box office, owing to the unexpected success of Aramm, which was released on the same day. Coupled with the success of the horror film Aval and Mersal, Nenjil Thunivirundhal underperformed commercially.

Within four days of the release of the film, Suseenthiran re-edited and trimmed nearly 20 minutes of the film to re-release, with many scenes featuring Mehreen Pirzada being removed. As the new version failed to get an immediate positive response, Suseenthiran chose to pull the film from the theatres on 16 November 2017 and later announced that there would be a re-release on 15 December 2017. Owing to the busy schedule at the box office, the idea was later scrapped, meaning that the film only ran for six days in Chennai.
