= Swathi Reddy =

Indian actress

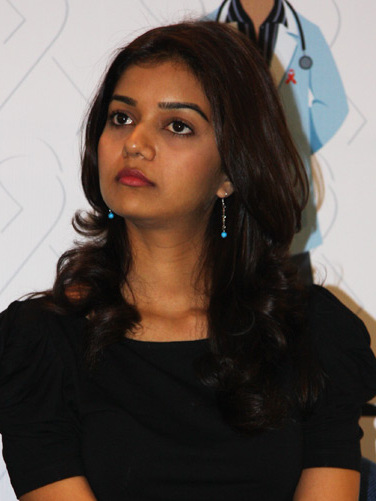
- Reddy at TeachAids launch in 2010
- Born: Svetlana Reddy; 19 April 1987 (age 39); Vladivostok, Russian SFSR, Soviet Union (present-day Far Eastern Federal District, Russia)
- Other name: Colours Swathi
- Occupations: Actress; television presenter; playback singer; voice actor
- Years active: 2005–present
- Spouse(s): Vikas Vasu (m. 2018; div. 2023) Srikanth Nagothi (m. 2026)

Swathi Reddy (born 19 April 1987) is an Indian actress and television presenter who predominantly works in Telugu films, and also in a few Tamil and Malayalam films. Reddy made her debut as a lead actress in the Tamil film Subramaniapuram (2008). Her role in the Telugu film Ashta Chamma (2008) earned her the Filmfare Award and Nandi Award for Best Actress – Telugu. Her other notable films include Aadavari Matalaku Arthale Verule (2007), Swamy Ra Ra (2013), Amen (2013), and Karthikeya (2014).

== Early life and education ==
Swathi Reddy was born in Vladivostok, located in the southerly reaches of the Russian Far East in the erstwhile Soviet Union. Her father, who was an officer in the Indian Navy, was training as a submariner in the Soviet Union when she was born. The Russian doctor who delivered her named her ‘Svetlana’ and later her mother changed it to 'Swathi'. She has one elder brother named Siddharth.

Reddy's family moved to Mumbai and later to the Eastern Naval Command, Visakhapatnam, where she spent most of her childhood. She was educated at St. Francis De Sales’ School in Visakhapatnam. While studying in 11th class, she moved to Hyderabad. She then enrolled at the St. Mary's College, Hyderabad and graduated in Biotechnology.

After her EAMCET, she ventured into television at the age of 17 by hosting a show called Colours. Due to a positive response, the show was further extended and moved to the primetime slot. She went on to present over 150 episodes.

== Career ==
After the completion of her first year of graduation, she got an offer to make her film debut in Krishna Vamsi's Danger (2005). She was part of an ensemble cast and was one of the five leads. The film received mixed to positive reviews. Priyanka Pulla of fullhyd.com wrote, "Swati making her much-anticipated debut here, has a role somewhat akin to a single member in a Mexican wave - contributory, but not self-sufficient enough to be judged."

After her second year of graduation, she did a supporting role in Aadavari Matalaku Ardhalu Verule (2007). The film won her good acclaim.

After the completion of her graduation she signed two films. In 2008, she debuted as a female lead in her first Tamil film Subramaniapuram. For her performance in Ashta Chamma(2008), she won the Filmfare Award for Best Actress – Telugu and Nandi Award for Best Actress. She made her debut in Malayalam cinema with Amen (2013) which was a super hit.

== Other work and media image ==
Reddy in 2016

In 2008, Reddy was placed in Rediff.com's "Best Actresses" list. She stood 2nd in "Best Tamil" and 5th in "Best Telugu" actresses list.

Reddy has been occasionally working as a dubbing artist and playback singer as well. In 2008, she had dubbed for actress Ileana in the film Jalsa (2008). In 2010, she gave her voice to an HIV/AIDS education animated software tutorial created by the nonprofit organization TeachAids. In 2011, she turned playback singer, rendering her voice for two songs, "Unbelievable" and "A Square B Square", for the soundtrack albums of her own film Katha Screenplay Darsakatvam Appalaraju (2011) and 100% Love (2011), respectively. She has also appeared in an advertisement for "Cadbury's Dairy Milk".

== Filmography ==
Year	Title	Role(s)	Language	Notes
2005	Danger	Lakshmi	Telugu	Credited as "Colours" Swathi
2007	Aadavari Matalaku Ardhalu Verule	Pooja/ Prasunaamba	Telugu	Credited as "Colours" Swathi
2008	Subramaniapuram	Thulasi	Tamil	Tamil debut
2008	Ashta Chamma	Lavanya	Telugu	Credited as "Colours" Swathi
2009	Kalavaramaye Madilo	Shreya	Telugu	
2010	Kanimozhi	Kanimozhi	Tamil	Cameo appearance
2011	Golconda High School	Anjali	Telugu	
2011	Katha Screenplay Darshakatvam Appalaraju	Krishna	Telugu	Also sang the song "Unbelievable".
2011	Mirapakaay	Train Passenger	Telugu	Cameo appearance
2011	Kandireega	Bujji	Telugu	Cameo appearance
2011	Poraali	Bharathi	Tamil	
2013	Amen	Shoshanna	Malayalam	Malayalam debut
2013	Swamy Ra Ra	Swathi	Telugu	Also sang the song "Yo Yo Memu Antha. "
2013	North 24 Kaatham	Narayani	Malayalam	
2013	Idharkuthane Aasaipattai Balakumara	Renu	Tamil	
2014	Bangaru Kodipetta	Bhanumati Pinnesetty	Telugu	
2014	Mosayile Kuthira Meenukal	Isa	Malayalam	
2014	Vadacurry	Naveena	Tamil	
2014	Karthikeya	Valli	Telugu	
2015	Aadu Oru Bheegara Jeeviyanu	Pinki	Malayalam	Cameo appearance
2015	Double Barrel	Laila/Babushka	Malayalam	
2015	Yatchan	Deepa	Tamil	
2015	Tripura	Tripura	Telugu	
2017	Yaakkai	Kavitha	Tamil	
2017	Thiri	Swathi	Tamil	
2017	London Babulu	Suryakantham	Telugu	
2019	Thrissur Pooram	Veni	Malayalam	
2022	Panchathantram	Roshini / Chitra	Telugu	Anthology film; Dual role, appears in the segments "Prelude" and "Leia - The purple cape Super hero"
2023	Month of Madhu	Lekha	Telugu	

=== Music video ===
Year	Title	Role	Language	Composer	Notes	Ref
2023	Soul of Satya	Satya	Telugu	Shruti Ranjani	along with Sai Dharam Tej	

=== Voice artist ===
Year	Title	Language	Actor
2008	Jalsa	Telugu	Ileana

== Discography ==
Year	Title	Language	Song(s)
2011	Katha Screenplay Darshakatvam Appalaraju	Telugu	"Unbelievable"
2011	100% Love	Telugu	"A Square B Square"
2013	Swamy Ra Ra	Telugu	"Yo Yo Yo Memu Antha"

== Awards and nominations ==
Year	Award category	Work	Result
2009	Filmfare Award for Best Actress – Telugu	Ashta Chamma	Won
2009	Nandi Award for Best Actress	Ashta Chamma	Won
2009	Filmfare Award for Best Actress – Tamil	Subramaniapuram	Nominated
2009	Vijay Award for Best Debut Actress	Subramaniapuram	Nominated
2012	Filmfare Award for Best Female Playback Singer – Telugu	"A Square B Square" from 100% Love	Nominated
2012	SIIMA Award for Best Female Playback Singer – Telugu	"A Square B Square" from 100% Love	Nominated
2024	Filmfare Award for Best Supporting Actress – Telugu	Month of Madhu	Nominated
2024	Indian Film Festival of Melbourne Best Actress	Month of Madhu	Nominated
