= Allu Sirish =

Indian actor

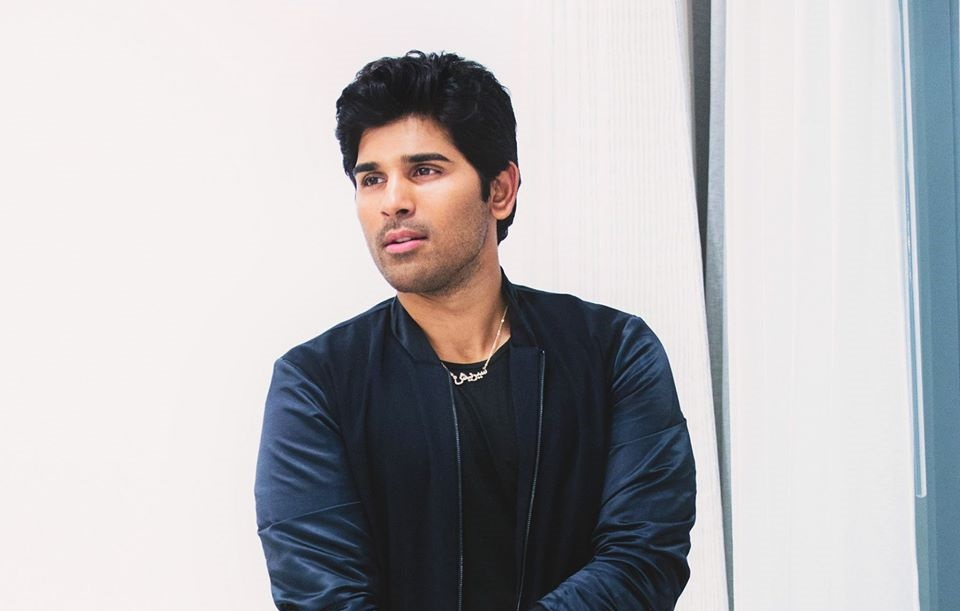
- Born: 30 May 1987 (age 39); Hyderabad, Telangana, India
- Education: R. D. National College, Hyderabad
- Occupation: Actor
- Years active: 1990; 2013–present
- Spouse: Nayanika Reddy (m. 2026)
- Father: Allu Aravind
- Relatives: Allu Arjun (brother)
- Family: See Konidela–Allu family

Allu Sirish (born 30 May 1987) is an Indian actor who works predominantly in Telugu films. He is the younger brother of leading Telugu cinema actor Allu Arjun. He debuted as a lead actor with Gouravam (2013) and later went on to appear in films such as Kotha Janta (2014), Srirastu Subhamastu (2016), Okka Kshanam (2017) and Urvasivo Rakshasivo (2022).

== Career ==
Sirish made his lead debut with the Telugu–Tamil bilingual film Gouravam (2013) opposite Yami Gautam, produced by Prakash Raj and directed by Radha Mohan. Though a commercial failure, it managed to have a fair share of reviews from critics for its theme. Kotha Janta (2014), a romantic comedy directed by Maruthi was about two different minded co-workers falling in love and the drama that ensues. It was the 3rd most watched Telugu movie of the year through satellite screening, which is quite a feat for a small budget film. Srirasthu Subhamastu (2016), directed by Parasuram, was a love story with family drama. The film received mixed to positive responses from critics. He was announced as the second lead opposite Mohanlal in 1971: Beyond Borders (2017), directed by Major Ravi, making this his debut in Malayalam. In 2017, he starred in the film Okka Kshanam, which was a sci-fi thriller based on the concept of parallel lives. The film was critically acclaimed. In 2019, He starred in the film ABCD – American Born Confused Desi, which was a Telugu remake of the Malayalam film with the same name, starring Dulquer Salmaan. The film was a story of a rich spoilt brat who gets kicked out of his house and finds it hard to reform. The film was released to mixed reviews.

He was given the "Crossover Star of the Year" award at the Lulu Fashion Awards in 2019 for his Malayalam entry.

His next appearance was in 2022, in the movie Urvasivo Rakshasivo, opposite to Anu Emmanuel.

== Personal life ==
Allu Sirish announced his engagement to Nayanika Reddy on 1 October 2025 on Instagram and the engagement ceremony was held on 31 October 2025. Allu Sirish married Nayanika Reddy on 6 March 2026 in Hyderabad, in the presence of their family and closest friends.

== Filmography ==
Key
†	Denotes films that have not yet been released

- All films are in Telugu, unless otherwise noted.

Year	Title	Role	Notes
1990	Pratibandh	Student	Child artist; Hindi film
2013	Gouravam	Arjun	Debut as Lead actor Also shot in Tamil
2014	Kotha Janta	Sirish	
2016	Srirastu Subhamastu	Sirish/Siri	
2017	1971: Beyond Borders	Second Lieutenant Chinmay	Malayalam film
2017	Okka Kshanam	Jeeva	
2019	ABCD: American Born Confused Desi	Arvind "Avi" Prasad	
2022	Urvasivo Rakshasivo	Sree Kumar	
2024	Buddy	Aditya Ram	

=== Music video ===
List of music videos
Year	Song	Singers	Co-artist	Language
2021	"Vilayati Sharaab"	Darshan Raval, Neeti Mohan	Heli Daruwala	Hindi

=== Television ===
List of television roles
Year	Title	Role
2016	IIFA Utsavam	Host
2017	Filmfare Awards South	Host
2017	SIIMA Awards	Host
2021	MasterChef India – Telugu	Guest
