= Karthikeya (soundtrack) =

Soundtrack album To Karthikeya by Shekar Chandra
- Released: 28 May 2014
- Recorded: 2013–2014
- Genre: Feature film soundtrack
- Length: 18:52
- Language: Telugu
- Label: Aditya Music
- Producer: Shekar Chandra

Shekar Chandra chronology
Boochamma Boochodu (2014)	Karthikeya (2014)	Brother of Bommali (2014)

Karthikeya is the soundtrack album to the 2014 film of the same name directed by Chandoo Mondeti, starring Nikhil Siddhartha and Swathi Reddy. The film score and soundtrack were composed by Shekar Chandra with lyrics provided by Ramajogayya Sastry, Vanamali and Krishna Chaitanya. It was released under the Aditya Music label on 28 May 2014. The soundtrack was further released in Tamil under the title Karthikeyan, with lyrics provided by Na. Muthukumar, Mani Amudhavan and Nandhalala.

== Release ==
The soundtrack was initially scheduled for release on late April 2014, which did not happen. The film's audio launch was held at the Taj Deccan in Hyderabad on 28 May 2014, with the cast and crew in attendance, along with Varun Sandesh, Manchu Manoj, Sudheer Babu, Allari Naresh, Aadi Saikumar and director Sudheer Varma felicitating the event. The Tamil version of the soundtrack was launched at the Sathyam Cinemas in Chennai on 18 June 2014, which saw the attendance of directors Mohan Raja, N. Lingusamy, producer Kalaipuli S. Thanu amongst others.

== Critical reception ==
Reviewing the soundtrack, The Times of India wrote "All in all, Shekhar Chandra tunes are youthful and fresh. The tunes can easily generate interest among music lovers" and rated the album 3 out of 5. Sify wrote "Sekhar Chandra has given decent background score for this maintaining the required tempo of the narration. Songs are not really needed in a thriller. Here it is such a waste." Suresh Kaviyarani of Deccan Chronicle noted that: "[a] plus point of this film is the background music by Sekhar Chandra. The film has a few songs but no regular romantic ones." Jeevi of Idlebrain.com added "Background music by Sekhar Chandra is good. But songs are wasted as there is no scope for songs in this thriller." A reviewer from OTTPlay added "Shekhar Chandra’s background score is another asset to the film."

== Track listing ==
Karthikeya (Telugu)
No.	Title	Lyrics	Singer(s)	Length
1.	"Prasnante"	Ramajogayya Sastry	Benny Dayal	3:51
2.	"Saripovu"	Vanamali	Haricharan	4:04
3.	"Inthalo Ennenni Vinthalo" (Male)	Krishna Chaitanya	Naresh Iyer	4:20
4.	"Punnami Vennelake"	Ramajogayya Sastry	Haricharan	2:45
5.	"Inthalo Ennenni Vinthalo" (Female)	Krishna Chaitanya	Chinmayi	2:31
6.	"Rise of Karthikeya"	–	Shekar Chandra	1:21
Total length:				18:52

Karthikeyan (Tamil)
No.	Title	Lyrics	Singer(s)	Length
1.	"Thedamal"	Mani Amudhavan	Ranjith	3:50
2.	"Penne Unnal Indre"	Na. Muthukumar	Haricharan	4:04
3.	"Vennila"	Mani Amudhavan	Naresh Iyer	4:18
4.	"Kangalum Kandadhilai"	Nandhalala	Haricharan	2:44
5.	"Thandavee"	Mani Amudhavan	Chinmayi	2:31
6.	"Rise of Karthikeyan"	–	Shekhar Chandra	1:21
Total length:				18:48

== Accolades ==
Award (Note: Awards are in alphabetical order.)	Date of ceremony (Note: Date is linked to the article about the awards held that year, wherever possible.)	Category	Recipient(s)	Result	Ref.
Filmfare Awards South	26 June 2015	Best Lyricist – Telugu	Vanamali – ("Saripovu")	Nominated	
Filmfare Awards South	26 June 2015	Best Male Playback Singer – Telugu	Haricharan – ("Saripovu")	Nominated	
Mirchi Music Awards South	23 July 2015	Lyricist of the Year – Telugu	Krishna Chaitanya – ("Inthalo Ennenni Vinthalo")	Nominated	
Mirchi Music Awards South	23 July 2015	Male Vocalist of the Year – Telugu	Haricharan – ("Saripovu")	Nominated	
Mirchi Music Awards South	23 July 2015	Female Vocalist of the Year – Telugu	Chinmayi – ("Inthalo Ennenni Vinthalo")	Nominated	
South Indian International Movie Awards	6–7 August 2015	Best Lyricist – Telugu	Vanamali – ("Saripovu")	Nominated	
