= Karthikeya 2 =

2022 Telugu-language film

- Theatrical release poster
- Directed by: Chandoo Mondeti
- Written by: Chandoo Mondeti; Manibabu Karanam
- Dialogue by: Manibabu Karanam
- Produced by: Abhishek Agarwal; T. G. Viswa Prasad
- Starring: Nikhil Siddhartha; Anupama Parameswaran; Anupam Kher; Adithya Menon
- Cinematography: Karthik Gattamneni
- Edited by: Karthik Gattamneni
- Music by: Kaala Bhairava
- Production companies: Abhishek Agarwal Arts; People Media Factory
- Distributed by: Zee Studios; E4 Entertainment (Kerala)
- Release date: 13 August 2022
- Running time: 145 minutes
- Country: India
- Language: Telugu
- Budget: ₹15 crore (Note: Actor Nikhil Siddhartha mentioned the official budget as ₹15 crore in an interview with Dainik Jagran. However, independent estimates of the budget vary. Eenadu and MensXP reported the budget as ₹15 crore. Times of India reported the budget as ₹15–20 crore, while News 18, India Today, and DNA India stated it as ₹30 crore.)
- Box office: ₹121.50 crore

Karthikeya 2 is a 2022 Indian Telugu-language mystery action-adventure film written and directed by Chandoo Mondeti. A sequel to the 2014 film Karthikeya, it stars Nikhil Siddhartha and Anupama Parameswaran. The film is produced by Abhishek Agarwal. and People Media Factory. The film is an inspiration of the 1981 American film Indiana Jones: Raiders of the Lost Ark. The story follows Karthikeya (Nikhil) as he embarks on a thrilling adventure to uncover the secrets behind an ancient idol of Lord Krishna. With historical puzzles, cryptic clues, and mythical challenges, Karthikeya races against time to protect the artifact from falling into the wrong hands, revealing profound truths about faith, devotion, and courage.

It was a major commercial success, emerging as one of the highest-grossing Telugu films of 2022, and was widely praised for its engaging screenplay, visual effects, and strong performances. Nikhil Siddhartha and Anupama Parameswaran received critical acclaim for their roles. The film's soundtrack by Kaala Bhairava was also well received, adding to the immersive experience of the movie.

Shot across picturesque locations in India, including Mysore and Udaipur, the film blended historical accuracy with cinematic grandeur. Its success led to discussions of expanding the Karthikeya franchise, with audiences eagerly anticipating the next installment.

The film was officially launched in March 2020. Filming took place in India, predominantly in Gujarat and Himachal Pradesh, in addition to Spain, Portugal, and Greece in Europe from February 2021 to March 2022. Made on a budget of ₹15 crore, Karthikeya 2 was released on 13 August 2022 to positive reviews from critics and emerged as a sleeper hit, in both Telugu and Hindi, becoming the 6th highest-grossing Telugu films of 2022. It won the Best Feature Film in Telugu at the 70th National Film Awards. It also won the state Gaddar Award for Second Best Feature Film.

== Plot ==
Ranganath Rao, an archaeologist and professor, visits a library in Greece, and through a book written by Ptolemy, he discovers that Shri Krishna, before the end of Dwapara Yuga, entrusted his friend and counselor Uddhava with his anklet, which is equipped with all the solutions for deadly problems that humans are going to face in the succeeding Kali Yuga.

In Hyderabad, Karthikeya "Karthik", now a doctor who believes in science and logic, is suspended for slapping a Mayor, who had attempted to perform a Yagna in the ICU for his son. At the same time, his father fractures his leg, and an ox hits the plant of Tulasi in front of their house. Considering all the inauspicious occurrences, Karthik's mother believes that her family is being punished for not being able to fulfil a vow made to Shri Krishna, a few years ago. Therefore, Karthik takes her to Dwarka, where his uncle Sadananda, an ardent devotee of Shri Krishna, lives. One night, Karthik crosses paths with a mortally wounded Ranganath Rao, who tries to tell him something. When Karthik leaves to fetch an auto rickshaw to take him to the hospital and returns, he fails to find Rao. The following day, Karthik's mother goes missing, and he searches for her with his uncle. He is arrested by the Police, who accuse him of murder and ask him what Rao had told him. When Karthik tells them that he was not able to interpret his words, the Police refuse to believe him. A girl, Mugdha, revealed to be Rao's granddaughter, rescues Karthik from Police custody. A mysterious man attacks Karthik, but stops when he sees the idol of Shri Krishna.

Karthik, Mugdha, and Sadananda visit a sage to find out about the man and learn that he belongs to the clan of Abheeras, an exiled community who resorted to dacoity but worshipped Shri Krishna. They wouldn't let the people who try to hinder Krishna's belongings live. Karthik finds his mother and is determined to solve the mystery; he advises her to be safe at an 11-day-long Pravachan. They visit Rao's office in Bet Dwarka and read a letter written by him. Rao had found that the anklet was hidden by Uddhava, who left behind clues to reach it, as the right person is destined to get it. For centuries, several people had tried to find the anklet, but to no avail. Pallava King Suryavarman reached the closest and told the penultimate clue to Ptolemy, who hid the object with a clue in Krishna Thatakam, which Rao was trying to utter when he met Karthik. Santanu, a professor in search of the anklet, kills Rao with evil intentions and is the one responsible for Karthik's arrest. Karthik finds a peacock-shaped object in Krishna Thatakam, and Mugdha decodes the Sanskrit inscription written on it, which leads them to Govardhan Hill. The trio hires Suleman to take them to Govardhana Hill, Mathura, without being caught by the Police. Upon arriving there, they are apprehended by villagers, who are greedy for the prize money announced by Santanu for Karthik and Mugdha. They manage to convince the villagers of their objectives and climb the hill to find an entrance, which they open using the peacock-shaped object, and retrieve a telescope from it.

The next morning, Mugdha escapes with the telescope, leaving Karthik, Sadananda, and Suleman. Santanu apprehends the trio and leaves them in the desert to die, but Mugdha arrives and rescues them, revealing that she had gone to her friend to find a person who would help them solve the mystery. Together, the four leave for Himachal Pradesh to meet a blind philosopher, Dr. Dhanvantari, who explains that Rao and Santanu were a part of a secret society, beandhat ancient India is far more advanced in technology than the modern world. When Santanu proposed to use the anklet for selfish reasons, Rao objected. Fate let Rao choose Karthik to carry his aim forward. Dhanvantari also explains that Krishna should be considered as a human rather than God, who was an extraordinary engineer for building his palace in the midst of the sea, a kinetic engineer for controlling the Sudarshana Chakra, a doctor for knowing all the Ayurvedic treatment methods, a musician for being talented in playing flute, which helped as a music therapy, and much more. Dhanvantari further reveals that the anklet is rumoured to contain advanced medical knowledge that can save humans from many diseases.

While returning, they are surrounded by the Police, and therefore, Karthik travels on the truck through a frozen river that begins to break. They manage to escape being drowned but are ambushed by an Abheera, who is forced to practice peace for 24 hours due to Krishna Paksha. Karthik observes the constellations on a hill, and the next clue leads them through the telescope; they find the final location. They reach the final location, but the Abheera tries to kill them. However, Karthik fights back and joins the telescope and peacock-shaped object forming the structure of a flute, which he places in the hand of Shri Krishna's idol situated at the place. Therefore, the entry to the underground hallway filled with snakes, which protects the anklet, is opened. Karthik uses his abilities to communicate with the snake to reach the anklet and wins nationwide fame. The secret knowledge inscribed on the anklet helps advance medical progress. Then, after seeing his achievement, Santanu invites Karthik into their secret society by using the anklet to rule the world, but Karthik declines the invitation and leaves. Later, the Abheeras surrender to Karthik while Santanu is brutally killed by them.

Subsequently, Karthik embarks on a new mission to unfold the link between Krishna and the deep waters of the Atlantic Ocean. The ending shot shows a submerged city where there are skeletons of humans trying to reach a mysterious door.

== Cast ==
- Nikhil Siddhartha as Dr.Karthikeya Kumaraswamy "Karthik"
- Anupama Parameswaran as Mugdha
- Anupam Kher as Dr. Dhanvanthri Vedpathak (Cameo)
- Adithya Menon as Dr. Santanu Mukherjee
- Rathika Rose as Dr. Santanu follower
- K. S. Sridhar as Professor Ranganatha Rao
- Srinivasa Reddy as Sadananda, Karthik's big brother
- Satya as Satya, Karthik's friend
- Praveen as Ravi, Karthik's friend
- Harsha Chemudu as Suleman
- Tulasi as Karthik's mother
- Venkatesh Mummudi as Abheera
- Appaji Ambarisha Darbha as Daivagna Sharma
- Paran Murmu as Paran

== Production ==
The sequel to Karthikeya was announced in October 2017 by Nikhil Siddhartha through Twitter saying that it would commence from the end of 2018. However, due to delays from his previous film Arjun Suravaram, the film was officially launched in March 2020 in Tirupati with a puja ceremony.

Principal photography commenced in February 2021 and was shot in Gujarat and Himachal Pradesh. However, in March 2021 filming was stalled due to Nikhil suffering a leg injury. Filming then resumed in April 2021. In March 2022, the makers travelled to Spain, Portugal and Greece for the final schedule.

== Soundtrack ==
Karthikeya 2

Soundtrack album by Kaala Bhairava
- Released: 13 August 2022
- Genre: Film soundtrack
- Language: Telugu
- Label: Zee Music Company
- Producer: Kaala Bhairava

Kaala Bhairava chronology
Modern Love Hyderabad (2022)	Karthikeya 2 (2022)	Dongalunnaru Jaagratha (2022)
External audio
- Audio Jukebox on YouTube

The film score and soundtrack album of the film is composed by Kaala Bhairava. The music rights were acquired by Zee Music Company. The full soundtrack album was released on 31 August 2022, while the Hindi version was released on 7 September 2022.

Track list
No.	Title	Lyrics	Singer(s)	Length
1.	"Nannu Nenu Adiga"	Krishna Madineni	Inno Genga	3:39
2.	"Krishna Trance" (Backing vocals: Hymath Mohammed, Sai Charan, Lokeshwar, Aditya Iyengar, Pvns Rohit, Prudhvi Chandra, Akhil Chandra, Sahithi Chaganti, Sri Sowmya, Snigdha Sharma, Gomathi Iyer)	Chaitanya Prasad	Kaala Bhairava	2:58
3.	"Prathi Udhayam"	Ramajogayya Sastry	Kaala Bhairava

== Release ==
=== Theatrical ===
Karthikeya 2 was released on 13 August 2022 in Telugu along with dubbed version in Hindi. In April 2022, it was announced that the film was going to release on 22 July 2022 but was later postponed to 12 August 2022 in order to avoid a clash with Thank You. It was later pushed back a day due to avoid a clash with another Telugu film, Macherla Niyojakavargam.

Sakshi reported that the worldwide theatrical rights of the film were sold at a cost of ₹17.25 crore. Zee Studios acquired theatrical, satellite and digital distribution rights of the film. Theatrical rights of the film were sold for ₹12.80 crore.

The Malayalam dubbed version of the film was released on 23 September 2022 in theatres across Kerala.

=== Home media ===
The post-theatrical digital streaming rights were acquired by ZEE5 and was premiered on 5 October 2022 (coinciding with Vijayadashami) in Telugu, Tamil and Hindi languages. According to ZEE5, the film garnered more than 100 crore viewing minutes within the first 48 hours.

== Inspiration ==
The Karthikeya franchise has drawn significant inspiration from the adventure-mystery genre popularized by Hollywood films, particularly the Indiana Jones series. Both Dr. Karthikeya Kumaraswamy (played by Nikhil Siddhartha) and Dr. Indiana Jones (played by Harrison Ford) are scholar-adventurers who uncover ancient secrets, navigate hidden temples, and solve complex mysteries.

While Indiana Jones explores global archaeological myths rooted in Western history, Karthikeya adapts the archetype to the Indian cultural and historical landscape, incorporating Hindu history, temple legends, and philosophical themes. Nikhil Siddhartha has described the film as “about an Indian superhero — Lord Krishna is the biggest superhero,” highlighting the series' emphasis on mythological inspiration alongside adventure.

Unlike Indiana Jones, the Karthikeya films blend scientific investigation with spiritual and mythological themes, offering a fusion of mystery, faith, and reason within an Indian context.

== Reception ==
=== Critical reception ===
Karthikeya 2 opened to highly positive reviews from critics and audience.

Dhaval Roy of The Times of India rated the Hindi version of the film 3.5 out of 5 stars and called it "an adventurous ride that's a grander and more exciting version of the first part." Jeevi of Idlebrain.com rated the film 3 out of 5 stars and said, "Karthikeya 2 is a decent adventurous mystic thriller that works." Neeshita Nyayapati of The Times of India rated the Telugu version of the film 3 out of 5 stars and wrote, "Karthikeya 2 remains a worthy successor to Karthikeya minus the over-the-top strong-arming of Nikhil's character by the end."

A critic for Sakshi Post rated the film 3 out of 5 stars and wrote, "Karthikeya 2 is a brilliant and stunning thriller." Satya Pulagam of ABP Desam rated the film 3 out of 5 stars and noted, "The story of Karthikeya 2 isn't as good as the first part, but the screenplay of Karthikeya 2 is gripping, especially the second half and the climax. Some of the scenes and the drama are extraordinary." Grace Cyril of India Today rated the film 1.5 out of 5 stars and wrote "Karthikeya 2 goes through various stages, but this journey could have been narrated in an easier manner."

A critic for Eenadu praised the backdrop, screenplay, and Nikhil's performance and called it an entertaining new journey. A critic for Andhra Jyothi called the film a 'spiritual thriller' and praised the director Chandoo Mondeti for giving the audience a new experience different from routine commercial films. Writing for The Hindu, Sangeetha Devi Dundoo opined that the premise is reminiscent of Ashwin Sanghi's book The Krishna Key. She further wrote, "Had the narrative been shorn of its preachy tone, Karthikeya 2 would have been a riveting thriller."

=== Box office ===
On its opening day, Karthikeya 2 collected a total gross of ₹8.50 crore (US$880,000) worldwide with a distributors' share of ₹5.05 crore (US$520,000). The film grossed more than ₹25 crore (US$2.6 million) at the worldwide box office in its opening weekend".

The Hindi dubbed version of the film initially saw a limited theatrical release. However, due to public demand, number of shows were increased from 53 to 1575 within 5 days in North India. The Hindi version netted ₹1.45 crore (US$150,000) at the domestic box office in the first three days. The film achieved its break even mark and entered into profit zone in 3 days. By the fourth week, the film has collected a total gross of $1.5 million at the United States box-office.

According to the media consulting firm Ormax Media, the domestic gross collection of the film was ₹91 crore, thus making it the highest-grossing film in India in August 2022 followed by Thiruchitrambalam and Laal Singh Chaddha. By the end of its theatrical run, Karthikeya 2 collected a worldwide gross of ₹121.50 crore with a distributor's share of ₹58.50 crore.

== Legacy ==
Karthikeya 2 became a landmark film in Telugu cinema for its unique blend of mythology, mystery, and adventure. The film's commercial success established Nikhil Siddhartha as a leading actor in the mythological-thriller genre and further cemented Anupama Parameswaran’s popularity. Its engaging narrative, visual effects, and portrayal of Indian history and culture inspired a renewed interest in mythological and archaeological-themed films in Tollywood.

The film’s success also boosted tourism to the locations featured in the movie, including Mysore and Udaipur, as fans visited to experience the film’s settings firsthand. Its soundtrack by Kaala Bhairava became widely popular, influencing music trends in contemporary Telugu cinema.

The success of Karthikeya 2 led to discussions about expanding the franchise, with speculation about sequels and spin-offs exploring other mythological mysteries. Industry analysts credited the film with setting new benchmarks for production values, storytelling, and audience engagement in Telugu films. Additionally, Karthikeya 2 has been referenced in discussions about the increasing trend of Indian films combining entertainment with educational content on history, culture, and mythology, inspiring filmmakers to explore similar themes in their projects.

== Accolades ==
Award (Note: Awards, festivals and organizations are in alphabetical order.)	Date of ceremony (Note: Date is linked to the article about the awards held that year, wherever possible.)	Category	Recipient(s)	Result	Ref.
Filmfare Awards South	3 August 2024	Best Film – Telugu	Abhishek Agarwal and T. G. Viswa Prasad	Nominated	
Filmfare Awards South	3 August 2024	Best Director – Telugu	Chandoo Mondeti	Nominated	
National Film Awards	2024	Best Feature Film in Telugu	Producers: Abhishek Agarwal and T. G. Viswa Prasad; Director: Chandoo Mondeti	Won	
South Indian International Movie Awards	15th September 2023	Best Film – Telugu	Abhishek Agarwal and T. G. Viswa Prasad	Nominated	
South Indian International Movie Awards	15th September 2023	Best Director – Telugu	Chandoo Mondeti	Nominated	
South Indian International Movie Awards	15th September 2023	Best Cinematographer – Telugu	Karthik Gattamneni	Nominated	
South Indian International Movie Awards	15th September 2023	Best Actor – Telugu	Nikhil Siddhartha	Nominated	
South Indian International Movie Awards	15th September 2023	Best Comedian – Telugu	Srinivasa Reddy	Won	
South Indian International Movie Awards	15th September 2023	Sensation of the Year Award	Nikhil Siddhartha, Chandoo Mondeti	Won	

== Future ==
Before the film's release, Mondeti announced his intentions to make Karthikeya 3. "I want to tell many stories of Karthikeya and want to make it into a franchise," Mondeti said in an interview with The New Indian Express. The final act of Karthikeya 2 sets the stage for Karthikeya 3.
