= Karthikeya (film) =

2014 Telugu film by Chandoo Mondeti

- Film poster
- Directed by: Chandoo Mondeti
- Written by: Chandoo Mondeti
- Produced by: Venkata Srinivas
- Starring: Nikhil Siddhartha; Swathi Reddy
- Cinematography: Karthik Gattamneni
- Edited by: Karthika Srinivas
- Music by: Shekar Chandra
- Production company: Magnus Cine Prime
- Release date: 24 October 2014
- Running time: 124 minutes
- Country: India
- Language: Telugu
- Budget: ₹4–6 crore
- Box office: est. ₹20 crore

Karthikeya is a 2014 Indian Telugu-language mystery thriller film written and directed by Chandoo Mondeti. Produced by Venkata Srinivas, the film stars Nikhil Siddhartha and Swathi Reddy in lead roles, with Tanikella Bharani, Rao Ramesh, and Jayaprakash in supporting roles. The music was composed by Shekar Chandra, while Karthik Ghattamaneni handled the cinematography.

The story revolves around Karthik, a curious medico who investigates the mysterious events surrounding a closed Karthikeya temple in the village of Subrahmanyapuram. The inspiration for the film came from an incident at Talupulamma Temple in Kakinada district. Principal photography for Karthikeya began on 5 July 2013 and concluded on 21 February 2014, with filming locations across Andhra Pradesh, including Araku, Bobbili, and Kumararama temple in Samarlakota, as well as in Pondicherry and several places in Tamil Nadu, such as Kumbakonam.

After several delays, the film was released on 24 October 2014 as a Diwali release. It received positive reviews and was a commercial success, grossing over ₹20 crore on a budget of ₹4–6 crore. At the 62nd Filmfare Awards South, Karthikeya earned four nominations, and at the 4th SIIMA Awards, it won one award from four nominations. Following the success of the film, a sequel titled Karthikeya 2 was released in 2022, which was also a critical and commercial success.

== Plot ==
In a village called Subramaniapuram, an old temple belonging to Subrahmanya Swami is closed because of some mysterious deaths, supposedly by a snakebite. Whoever arrives to investigate this matter also gets killed. Karthikeya is a medical student who does not believe in supernatural powers. He analyzes everything using science and logic. He visits Subramaniapuram for a medical camp, along with his love interest Valli. Karthikeya becomes curious about the closed temple and gathers information about it to solve the mystery. He finds a diary written by a person named Shankar, an Endowments Department (ED) official who previously researched the temple and its mystery but was killed by a snakebite in the same building where Karthikeya and his friends were currently residing for the camp.

Around the same time, the snake tries to kill Karthikeya, but he escapes each time. He takes the snake to a herpetologist, who reveals that the snake was hypnotized by someone to kill Karthikeya. Karthikeya meets Valli's father, who happens to be a priest at the temple, to find out about the history of the temple. They leave for Thanjavur to find out that the temple is built very uniquely by the great architect Viswakarma, and the family heirloom of the king who ruled that area, a diamond, was placed at the feet of the Lord in such a way that on Karthika Pournami, the moon's rays fall on the feet of the Lord and the diamond reflects it back with 1000 times more intensity.

Karthikeya returns to the village and finds out that Thaayattu, a cook/helper in his temporary residence at Subramaniapuram, was a part of the gang trying to kill him. Thaayattu tries to escape, but is later killed. Karthikeya goes into the temple at night, which is coincidentally also the night of Karthika Pournami. He finds an ED officer named Prudhvi Raj in the temple and realises that he is the mastermind behind the whole conspiracy. Prudhvi tries to attack Karthikeya, but at the same time, the diamond reflects the moon's rays and the whole village realises that the Lord is still in the temple. Karthikeya, along with his friends, interrogates Prudhvi, who reveals that the temple had attracted some foreigners who had learnt about the diamond.

Prudhvi Raj decides to steal the diamond from the temple by making everyone believe that a curse is laid on the temple, in which everyone will die due to a snakebite. He sought Tayattu's help to develop a snake venom shot and used snake hypnosis to strike fear into the villagers' hearts. Prudhvi Raj is arrested and later dies in prison due to a snakebite. Karthikeya returns to Hyderabad, where he completes his graduation and receives his MBBS degree at the convocation. He then leaves for Goa with his friends to investigate a cave.

== Cast ==
- Nikhil Siddhartha as Karthikeya "Karthik" Kumaraswamy
- Swati Reddy as Srivalli "Valli"
- Tanikella Bharani as Valli's father
- Rao Ramesh as Prudhvi Raj
- Jayaprakash as Dr. Prakash
- Kishore as Sahadev
- Tulasi as Karthik's mother
- Praveen as Ravi, Karthik's friend
- Satya as Satya, Karthik's friend
- Shankar Melkote as Principal
- Jogi Naidu as Thaayattu
- Raja Ravindra as ED Officer Shankar
- Chatrapathi Sekhar
- Vajja Venkata Giridhar as Karthik's brother
- Meena Kumari as Karthik's sister-in-law

== Production ==
=== Development ===
When I visited a popular temple called Talupulamma Thalli near Tuni, I heard about an incident that apparently happened there. Interestingly the temple closes at 7 pm and nobody dares to go near the temple after that. Once a family visited the temple and a child got left back inside the temple. The temple authorities did not allow the family to go inside as the temple was closed. They went inside the next morning and got the child out and he was fine. However, I was told, one person from the family had tried to enter the temple at night without anyone’s knowledge and he went missing! That incident inspired me to write Karthikeya.

— Chandoo Mondeti on the inspiration behind the story of Karthikeya.

After Swamy Ra Ra, Nikhil Siddhartha signed his next film to be directed by his friend Chandoo Mondeti in which he was supposed to play "a smart, well educated, suave young man studying MBBS". Venkat Srinivas agreed to produce the film under his Magnus Cine Prime banner. Swati Reddy was signed as the lead actress considering her popularity in Tamil and she also appeared in Swamy Ra Ra. Tanikella Bharani revealed that he would be seen as Swati's father. The principal cast of the film further consists of Rao Ramesh, Jayaprakash, Kishore and Tulasi. Shekar Chandra was announced as the film's music composer.

Nikhil noted in an interview, "When I was young, films like Bhairava Dweepam and Aditya 369 fascinated me. Later I liked watching Sherlock Holmes. That character was curious and inquisitive. Karthikeya is all about mystery and adventure; it’s a light-hearted subject." For his role, Nikhil had to gain 10 kgs weight. His research for the role involved spending time with medical students and doctors before the shooting. He also had to overcome his fear of injections and blood to pull off the character.

=== Filming ===
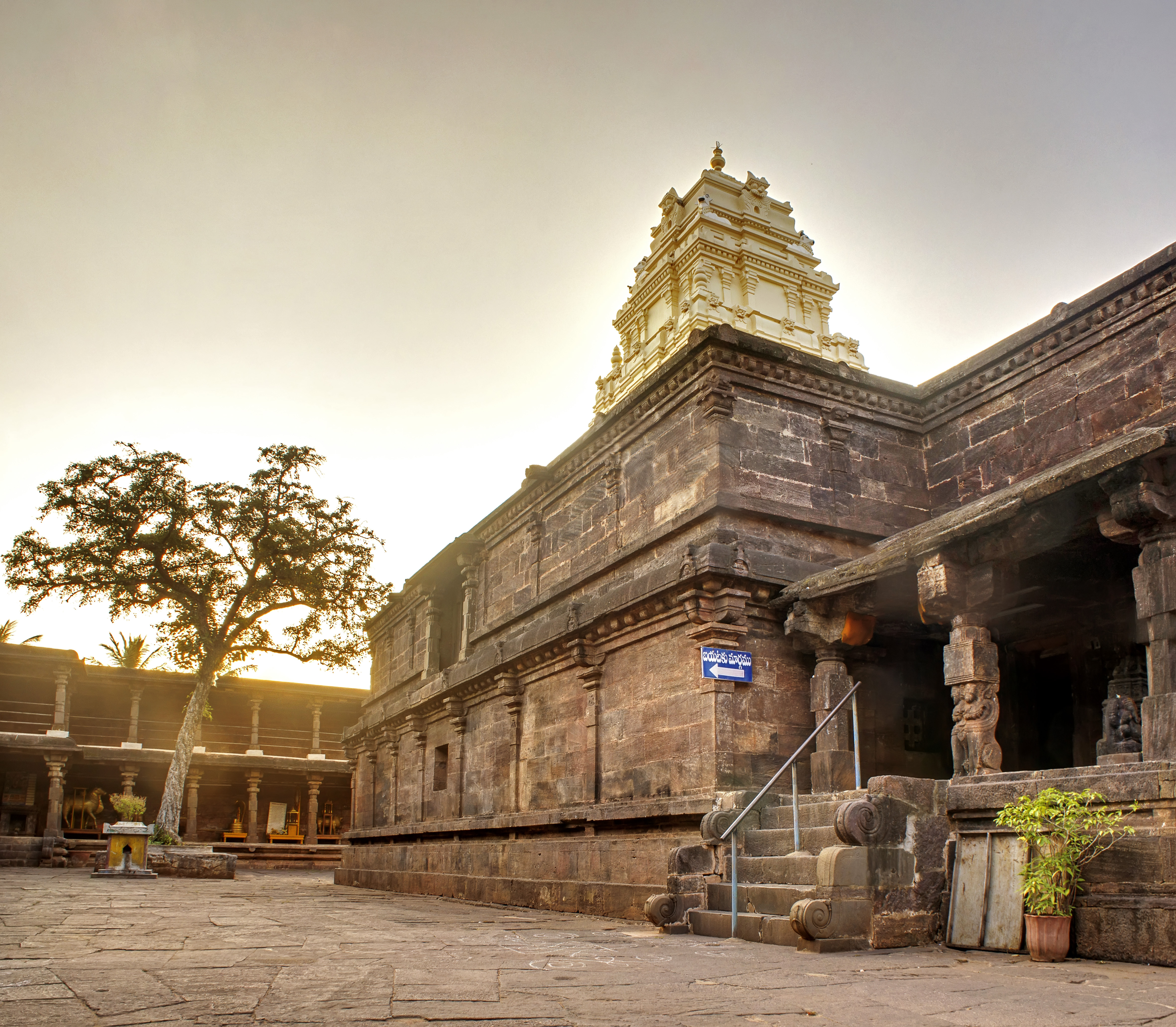
Kumararama temple at Samarlakota, one of the shooting locations of the film.

The film was launched on 10 June 2013 in Hyderabad with N. Lingusamy, Sudheer Varma and Parasuram in attendance. The makers also unveiled the title and film's logo the same day during the launch, with the team further announced that majority of the film will be shot in Visakhapatnam, Araku, and Kumararama temple in Samarlakota in Andhra Pradesh. Principal photography began on 5 July 2013 with the first schedule of the film took place the same day and completed within 31 July.

The film's second schedule took place on 4 August and was wrapped up by 29 August 2013, with scenes on the lead pair including two songs were shot. In early October 2014, the film was shot in and around Kumbakonam including a Subramanya Swamy temple there. By then 70% of the film's shoot was wrapped up. The film's final schedule commenced on 15 November 2013 on whose completion the film's shoot was expected to end. The film was also shot in Bobbili and Pondicherry. On 4 February 2014 a press release confirmed that the filming is complete except for one song. Filming ended nearly on 21 February 2014 and post-production work began. CG works were in progress during mid-April 2014. In July 2014, it was known that nearly 50% of the film was shot in and around Tamil Nadu. The film was also planned to be simultaneously shot in Tamil although the Tamil version Karthikeyan was dropped in favour of a dubbed release.

== Music ==
Shekar Chandra composed the film's soundtrack and background score. Lyrics for the Telugu version of the soundtrack were written by Ramajogayya Sastry, Vanamali and Krishna Chaitanya, whilst the soundtrack of its dubbed Tamil version Karthikeyan, had lyrics written by Na. Muthukumar, Mani Amudhavan and Nandhalala. The soundtrack of the Telugu version was launched at Hyderabad on 28 May 2014. The soundtrack of the Tamil version was launched at Chennai on 18 June 2014. Both the versions were marketed by Aditya Music.

== Release ==
The film was initially slated for a December 2013 release. But due to extensive production delays, the film was postponed to 1 August 2014. After being delayed due to several reasons, the makers announced 10 October 2014 was announced as the release date. It was finally postponed to 24 October 2014 clashing with the Telugu dubbed versions of Poojai, Happy New Year, Ishq Wala Love and also with a Telugu film I Am In Love making it a Diwali release. The film released in 350 screens in its first week and 30-40 screens were added in early November 2014 while the shows in Prasads IMAX were increased to 10 from 3 with effect from 29 October 2014. Meanwhile, Nikhil said that the release date of the Tamil version Karthikeyan will be announced soon, although not being released in Tamil. 150 Additional screens were added from its second Friday, 31 October. N. Lingusamy bought the film's Tamil rights while a Malayalam dubbed version was planned. The satellite rights were sold to Gemini TV for an amount of ₹1.5 crore.

=== Marketing ===
A 90 seconds teaser was launched on 1 December 2013 at Hyderabad. The first look poster featuring Nikhil Siddhartha and the temple was unveiled on 5 February 2014. The first look posters of Tamil version titled Karthikeyan were unveiled on 5 March 2014. On 18 October 2014 the making video of the film's posters was released. On 21 October 2014, Nikhil and the film's unit conducted a publicity tour in five towns viz. Guntur, Vijayawada, Eluru, Rajahmundry and Kakinada to paste the first release posters of the movie respectively. Nikhil, Swati and Chandoo promoted the film on the talk show Ali Talkies hosted by comedian Ali.

== Reception ==
=== Critical reception ===
The film received generally positive reviews from critics. Hemanth Kumar of The Times of India rated the film 3.5 out of 5 stars and wrote, "The good thing about the film is that it sticks to its storyline and everyone seems to know what they are doing. Karthikeya is one of the finer films made in the recent past and in times like these, that in itself is like a big compliment." 123Telugu.com rated it 3.5 out of 5 stars and stated, "On the whole, Karthikeya is one of the most refreshing films in the recent past. Novel concept, gripping screenplay, Nikhil’s performance and cleverly designed suspense elements make this film different from others, and ends up as quite an engaging watch this weekend." Jeevi of Idlebrain.com rated it 3.25 out of 5 stars wrote, "Actor Nikhil and producer should be appreciated for agreeing to do a film that is different from regular Telugu movies. Supported by a neat screenplay and a bit of comedy, debutant director Chandoo Mondeti delivers a decent movie. Additional plus point of the movie is runtime. The minus points of the movie are slow-paced narration. The family drama and romance didn’t work well. On a whole, Karthikeya is a different yet interesting movie." Suresh Kavirayani of Deccan Chronicle rated the film 3 out of 5 stars and wrote, "Despite its drawbacks ‘Karthikeya’ is a very refreshing film and Chandu Mondeti's debut can be termed a success. It is a thriller with tight screenplay a new story. Whoever feels bored with the regular song-dance masala films, should watch this thriller for a change." Oneindia Entertainment and IndiaGlitz both rated it 3 out of 5 stars and called the film a one time watch.

Sify wrote "Overall Karthikeya is different from regular commercial movies that dot the Telugu screen. Like we said it is a suspense thriller that mixes bhakti and rational thinking quite well to large extent and we do appreciate the producer and the actor Nikhil for attempting something novel". Y. Sunita Chowdary of The Hindu wrote, "The narration is good, keeps the curiosity factor alive. There is sufficient humour and romance to keep the film balanced and the story is about the crime but about the mindset of the criminal who uses a clever mix of science and religion to plan a brilliant murder".

=== Box office ===
Karthikeya got a brilliant opening at the worldwide box office on its first day. The film collected approximately ₹2.35 crore at the Indian box office in the first weekend of 3 days and ₹75.6 lakh at USA box office taking its three-day total to ₹3.1 crore nett thus recovering more than 50% of its production cost. The film collected ₹10 crore in its first week at the global box office and entered profit zone. The film cashed in on the mixed response for Current Theega and managed to collect a total of ₹15 crore in 9 days at the Global box office. Despite new releases, the film stood strong by the end of its third weekend and grossed ₹20 crore in 17 days.

== Awards and nominations ==
Ceremony	Category	Nominee	Result	Ref.
62nd Filmfare Awards South	Best Film - Telugu	Venkat Srinivas	Nominated	
62nd Filmfare Awards South	Best Director - Telugu	Chandoo Mondeti	Nominated	
62nd Filmfare Awards South	Filmfare Award for Best Lyricist – Telugu	Vanamali for "Saripovu"	Nominated	
62nd Filmfare Awards South	Best Male Playback Singer – Telugu	Haricharan for "Saripovu"	Nominated	
4th South Indian International Movie Awards	Best Debutante Producer – Telugu	Venkat Srinivas	Won	
4th South Indian International Movie Awards	Best Debut Director – Telugu	Chandu Mondeti	Nominated	
4th South Indian International Movie Awards	Best Cinematographer – Telugu	Karthik Ghattamaneni	Nominated	
4th South Indian International Movie Awards	Best Lyricist – Telugu	Vanamali for "Saripovu"	Nominated	
1st IIFA Utsavam	Best Direction – Telugu	Chandoo Mondeti	Nominated	

== Sequel ==
A sequel, Karthikeya 2 was announced in 2019 by the director of the film Chandoo Mondeti. The shooting of the film was launched in March 2020 and was paused for five months due to COVID-19 pandemic in India. The film stars the actors from this film along with some new actors.

Nikhil Siddhartha and Chandoo Mondeti teamed up for Karthikeya in 2014. They took eight years to collaborate again. The sequel Karthikeya 2 hit theaters in 2022. The thriller became a huge hit in Telugu and Hindi languages. Now, fans are demanding the makers make a sequel to it immediately. However, the makers confirm it the third part of the franchise of Kartikeya can only be launched in 2024.
