= Surya vs Surya =

- Directed by: Karthik Gattamneni
- Written by: Chandoo Mondeti (dialogues)
- Screenplay by: Karthik Gattamneni
- Story by: Karthik Gattamneni
- Produced by: Malkapuram Shivakumar
- Starring: Nikhil Siddharth; Tridha Choudhury
- Cinematography: Karthik Gattamneni
- Edited by: Naveen Nooli
- Music by: Satya Mahaveer
- Production company: Surakh Entertainments
- Distributed by: Malkapuram ShivaKumar
- Release date: 5 March 2015
- Running time: 130 minutes
- Country: India
- Language: Telugu
- Box office: ₹22 crore

Surya vs Surya is a 2015 Indian Telugu-language romantic comedy film written and directed by debutant Karthik Ghattamaneni and produced by Malkapuram Shiva under Suraksh Entertainments. It stars Nikhil Siddharth and Tridha Choudhury in the lead roles, while Madhoo, Sayaji Shinde, Tanikella Bharani, and Rao Ramesh play supporting roles. The music was composed by Satya Mahaveer. The film was released on 5 March 2015. The film was a commercial success.

== Plot ==
The film story revolves around a young man Surya who has Photophobia, a genetic disorder that prevents him from going into the sunlight during the day. This prevents him from enjoying life during daytime. He is raised by his single mother and falls in love with a TV anchor. He doesn't reveal this medical condition to his lady love as he reasons that she may respond negatively. She feels cheated when she hears about it from others. The rest of the story is about how Surya wins her affection back.

== Cast ==
- Nikhil Siddharth as Surya
- Tridha Choudhury as Sanjana
- Madhoo as Surya's mother
- Sayaji Shinde as Sanjana's father
- Raghavendra Rao as Surya's friend
- Tanikella Bharani as Ersam
- Rao Ramesh as Doctor
- Thagubothu Ramesh as Kulfi vendor
- Viva Harsha as Ice kola vendor
- Satya as Aruna Sai
- Mast Ali as Zin Zuber
- Praveen
- Allari Subhashini
- Raghuvaran as Surya's deceased father (photo shown)

== Soundtrack ==
No.	Title	Singer(s)	Length
1.	"Prema Santosham"	Divya Kumar, Haricharan
2.	"Sayantham Aaruki"	Senthildass Velayutham
3.	"Nee Kosam Nee Kosam"	M. L. R. Karthikeyan
4.	"Full 2 Masthi Re"	Ranjith
5.	"Vennellona Mounam" (Duet Version)	Chinmayi, Karthik
6.	"Hrudhayame Oh Meghamalle"	Ranjith
7.	"Vennellona Mounam" (Female Version)	Chinmayi

== Reception ==
Karthik Keramalu of IBNLive wrote "'Surya vs Surya' is a thoroughly enjoyable fair. It's the season's recommended 'ice gola'" and rated the film 3.5 out of 5. Sangeetha Devi Dundoo of The Hindu opined that the film had a "good premise" and "could have been so much better", she added. Hemant Kumar writing for The Times of India gave the film 2.5/5 and called the film a "wasted opportunity."
