= Kalavar King =

- Theatrical poster
- Directed by: L. Suresh
- Produced by: Srinivasa Rao Dammalapati; M. Chandrasekhar
- Starring: Nikhil Siddharth; Shweta Basu Prasad
- Cinematography: B. Balamurugan
- Edited by: Marthand K. Venkatesh
- Music by: Anil R
- Distributed by: Sai Krishna Productions
- Release date: 26 February 2010
- Running time: 138 minutes
- Country: India
- Language: Telugu

Kalavar King is a 2010 Indian Telugu-language romantic comedy film directed by L. Suresh starring Nikhil Siddharth and Shweta Basu Prasad. The film was released on 26 February 2010. The film was a box office failure, but was still remade in Tamil as Eththan (2011) by the same director and in Kannada as Melkote Manja (2017).

== Plot ==
Rajesh (Nikhil Siddharth) is a not-so-innocent village boy who wants to make it big in life without having to work hard and in the process ends up borrows money from every person in the village. In a parallel track, we have Shruthi (Shweta Prasad) who is being harassed by the local goon Narender (Ajay) who also happens to be her brother-in-law. Rajesh & Shruthi meet and a couple of misunderstandings lead to Rajesh turning over a new leaf. He then transforms into a successful loan recovery agent and decides to rescue Shruthi from the clutches of her brother-in-law. Eventually, they realize their love for each other before an insipid climax leads to a happy ending.

== Cast ==
- Nikhil Siddharth as Rajesh
- Shweta Basu Prasad as Shruthi
- Ajay as Narender
- Y. Kasi Viswanath as Rajesh's father
- Pragathi as Rajesh's mother
- Ali as fan of Arundhati
- Suman Setty as Villager
- Raghu Babu as Narender's henchman
- Dharmavarapu Subramanyam as Bank manager
- Venu Madhav as Veera Simham
- Ahuti Prasad as Police officer
- Duvvasi Mohan as Auto driver
- Sivannarayana Naripeddi as Rajesh's father's friend
- Rocket Raghava as Veera Simham's friend
- Dhanraj as Somu
- Praveen as Sathya
- Gautam Raju as Doctor
- Bharath Raju as Police Officer
- Chatrapathi Sekhar as Sambu
- Satya as Satya Darling

== Production ==
The film's title was revealed on 2 November 2009. The film was in the shooting phase as of December 2009.

== Soundtrack ==
The music was composed by Anil R. and released by Aditya Music. The audio release function was held at Ramanaidu studios on 21 December 2009.

Kalavar King

Soundtrack album by Anil R.
- Released: 1 December 2009
- Recorded: 2009
- Genre: Soundtrack
- Length: 17:56
- Label: Aditya Music
- Producer: Anil.R

Anil R. chronology
Ninna Nedu Repu (2008)	Kalavar King (2009)	Life Before Wedding (2011)

Track list
No.	Title	Lyrics	Singer(s)	Length
1.	"Dhoola Therindha"	Bhaskarabhatla Ravi Kumar	Baba Sehgal	1:44
2.	"De Thadi"	Krishna Chaitanya	Antony, Sonu Kakkar	4:11
3.	"Eidhe Eidhe"	Krishna Chaitanya	Joi Barua, Sravana Bhargavi	4:12
4.	"Veede Veede"	Vanamali	Joi Barua, Sagari P. V.	3:44
5.	"Aa Bugga"	Veturi	Baba Sehgal, Sonu Kakkar	4:05
Total length:				17:56
