= Kirrak Party =

Kirik Party
- Theatrical release poster
- Directed by: Sharan Koppisetty
- Screenplay by: Sudheer Varma
- Based on: Kirik Party by Rakshit Shetty and the 7 Odds (Kannada)
- Produced by: Ramabrahmam Sunkara; Abhishek Agarwal
- Starring: Nikhil Siddharth; Simran Pareenja; Samyuktha Hegde
- Cinematography: Advaitha Gurumurthy
- Edited by: M. R. Varma
- Music by: B. Ajaneesh Loknath
- Production companies: AK Entertainments; Abhishek Agarwal Arts
- Release date: 16 March 2018
- Running time: 151 minutes
- Country: India
- Language: Telugu
- Box office: est. ₹14.4 crore

Kirrak Party is a 2018 Indian Telugu-language campus romantic comedy film directed by Sharan Koppisetty and produced by Ramabrahmam Sunkara and Abhishek Agarwal, under AK Entertainments and Abhishek Agarwal Arts. The film is the remake of 2016 Kannada film Kirik Party which was directed by Rishab Shetty. The film features Nikhil Siddharth in the lead role along with Simran Pareenja, making her debut and Samyuktha Hegde reprising her role from the Kannada version.

The screenplay was written by Sudheer Varma and the dialogues by Chandoo Mondeti. The film's score and soundtrack are scored by B. Ajaneesh Loknath who composed for the Kannada version as well. The theatrical trailer was released on 13 March 2018. The film was released on 16 March 2018.

== Plot ==
Set in Vijayawada, the story starts with a song introducing the characters of the film. Krishna (Nikhil Siddharth) a first year student meets Meera (Simran Pareenja) a final year student and daughter of a police officer. Everyone in the campus likes Meera at last, even Krishna's friends likes Meera. Meera gets close to Krishna and they both become good friends. Meera is a writer of a book about a sex worker Vijaya's life and she knows the sex worker personally. The sex worker is pregnant and one day she gets labour pain. Meera along with Krishna takes her to the hospital. The sex worker bears a baby girl and keeps the baby's name as Meera. Krishna holds the baby and gets emotional. Meera always saw Krishna as a fun, loving and cheerful guy. Seeing Krishna as innocent and emotional Meera suggests Krishna to discover his second half.

They become close friends and starts to go out together. In the girls hostel, girls were celebrating the final year students send off party meanwhile even the boys enter the hostel and everyone starts to sing and dance. The boys leave the hostel, Meera and her friends decides to drink whereas Meera refuses to do so but due to her friends she sips a bit of vodka. While dancing Meera falls from the hostel rooms window and dies. Krishna gets upset. Everyone starts to speak about Meera in a wrong way even Meera's father gets angry about Meera getting drunk. Seeing all this Krishna gets angry and starts to beat his senior.

After three years Krishna is in his final year, he becomes stubborn and rude. He is in the final year and Satya (Samyuktha Hegde) his junior doing her first year in electrical stream falls in love with Krishna. Krishna and his friends get apart due to fight and he forms another group.

Krishna stands for the college election and also wins the election and becomes president of the college. Satya wants to change Krishna. She wants to make Krishna as he was in the first year of college. Satya and Krishna go for a long drive where Krishna and Satya do some mischievous things which brings a smile on Krishna's face. Satya takes Krishna to Meera''s house unknowingly. Krishna sees Meera's parents and her photos in the house and gets emotional. Meera's father apologizes for not trusting his daughter and thanks Krishna for the diary which he gave after Meera's death. Meera's dad gives the diary to Krishna and asks him to read it. Krishna leaves the house and on his way he goes to the sex worker's house whom he and Meera had helped during her labor pain. Krishna sees the sex worker's child and gets emotional as her name is also Meera. Krishna leaves the house and meets Satya, she tells him that he is lost in his past and asks him to come to the reality and leaves from there giving an emoji badge to him.

Krishna gets stuck in Satya's words and leaves on bike to another place. Krishna decides to sell the car which he and his friends bought in the first year and give the money for the sex worker's child's education. In his trip Krishna learns that he is in love with Satya. He goes back to college. It was his final day in college. Krishna writes two letters, one to Satya and another one to the Principal stating that he and his friends locked him in the car and blamed his other friends. In Satya's letter he writes that he loves her and wants to be with her. Krishna and his friends get back together forming the same bond as first year. Principal forgives Krishna and his friends without reading the letter. In the send off party Satya comes with the letter and tells Krishna that he is really a good human being and he accepted his mistake and asks him to give the letter to the Principal and not to her. Everyone gets shocked and Krishna realizes that he swapped the letter. The Principal reads the letter and gets to know that Krishna loves Satya, his daughter. In the end principal shouts at Krishna.

== Cast ==
- Nikhil Siddharth as Krishna
- Simran Pareenja as Meera Joseph
- Samyuktha Hegde as Satya
- Rakendu Mouli as Arjun
- Deepthi Sunaina as Deepu Satya's friend
- Viva Raghav as Appala Raju (Appu)
- Sameer Malla as John Abraham
- Mourya Siddavaram as Mourya Reddy
- Karthik Adusumalli as Vinay
- Brahmaji as Mechanic Pandu
- Hanumanthegowda as Dr. Srinivas Murthy/ Principal of college
- Raghu Karumanchi as peon
- Naveen Sanaka as Sunny
- Viva Suhas as Reddy
- Shiju as Meera's Father
- Pramodini Pammi as Meera's mom
- Sayaji Shinde as Krishna's father
- Arohitha Gowda as Vijaya
- Amit Anand Raut as senior student
- Bunny Abiran

== Production ==
Most of the scenes were shot in Vijayawada, Andhra Pradesh, including K L University, Usha Rama College of Engineering and Technology, kakinada Aditya engineering college

== Soundtrack ==
Kirrak Party

Soundtrack album by B. Ajaneesh Loknath
- Released: 23 January 2018 (first single)
- Recorded: 2018
- Genre: Soundtrack
- Length: 29:53
- Label: Aditya Music
- Producer: B. Ajaneesh Loknath

B. Ajaneesh Loknath chronology
Nimir (2018)	Kirrak Party (2018)	Rajaratha (2018)

The music was composed by B. Ajaneesh Loknath and released on Aditya Music Company.

No.	Title	Lyrics	Singer(s)	Length
1.	"Dumdare Dumdare"	Vanamali	Haricharan	3:51
2.	"Guruvaram"	Rakendu Mouli	Vijay Prakash	3;36
3.	"Last Bench"	Ramajogayya Sastry	Shashank Sheshagiri, Chintan Vikas, Varun Ramachandra	2:55
4.	"Sir Bewarse"	Rakendu Mouli	Shashank Sheshagiri	3:03
5.	"Neechamaina"	Rakendu Mouli	Vasishta N. Simha	3:26
6.	"Neelo Ninnu"	Ramajogayya Sastry	Shreya Ghoshal	3:41
7.	"Pranamantha"	Ramajogayya Sastry	Kaala Bhairava	3:21
8.	"Meera's - Theme"	Rakendu Mouli	Sameera Bharadwaj	2:12
9.	"Dam Dare (Coir)"	Vanamali	B. Ajaneesh Loknath	3:48
Total length:				29:53

== Reception ==
=== Critical reception ===
Neeshita Nyayapati of The Times of India rated the film 2.5 out of 5 and wrote that "All in all, this film seems to lack the ‘Kirrak’ factor but is good enough for a one-time watch, especially if you're a student." In contrast, Priyanka Sundar of Hindustan Times said that the film is a devoted remake of Kirik Party.

Another critic from The Indian Express said that "If not for some change in the lead star cast and language, it would be hard to tell any difference between Kirrak Party and Kirik Party." and praised the music compositions and acting performances by the lead actors.

=== Box office ===
It collected a gross of $120K on its opening day in the United States. A gross of over ₹10 crore was collected at the box office in the first two days. The film collected a distributor's share of ₹5.50 crore in the first week.
