= Lakshmi Ghar Aayi =

Indian television series

- Genre: Social Drama
- Written by: Virendra Shahaney; Damini Shetty; Priya Om Jha; Surabhi Saral; Rahil Qazi
- Screenplay by: Damini Kanwal Shetty
- Story by: Nilima Bajpai; Virendra Sahani
- Directed by: Anshuman Kishore Singh; Vivek Kumar
- Starring: Simran Pareenja; Akshit Sukhija; Ananya Khare
- Theme music composer: Hriju Roy; Brijesh Singh
- Opening theme: "Bahu Beha Ke Laayi Hai"
- Country of origin: India
- Original language: Hindi
- No. of seasons: 1
- No. of episodes: 55

Production
- Producers: Shyamashish Bhattacharya; Nilima Bajpai; Alok Sahay
- Editor: B. Rajgopal Rupesh Kumar
- Camera setup: Multi-camera
- Running time: 22–24 minutes
- Production companies: Shakuntalam Telefilms; Alok Sahay Films

Original release
- Network: Star Bharat
- Release: 5 July – 17 September 2021

Related
- Sthreedhanam

Lakshmi Ghar Aayi is an Indian Hindi-language television social drama that aired from 5 July 2021 to 17 September 2021 on Star Bharat. The show deals with the issue of the dowry system in India. It was produced by Shakuntalam Telefilms and Alok Sahay Films. It starred Simran Pareenja, Akshit Sukhija and Ananya Khare as main leads.

== Plot ==
The plot revolves around the life of Mathili Tiwari who becomes a victim of dowry. The story starts with the quest of Jwala Devi Kumar, Raghav Kumar's mother to find an ideal daughter-in-law who would bring all the richness to satisfy her greed. Maithili and Raghav meet each coincidentally when both are invited to the same wedding, where Jwala is also present searching for a bride for her son, Raghav. Seeing the respect and riches owned by Maithili's father, Arun Tiwari, Maithili is also chosen by Jwala to become her son, Raghav’s wife. Later in a turn of unfortunate events created by Jwala, Raghav’s saves both Maithili and her friend, Shikha, where it is revealed that both Maithili and Raghav share the same thoughts against the dowry system still prevailing in India.

The story progresses with another chance meeting of Maithili and Raghav where they turn into good acquaintances learning about each other’s identity. Things take a better turn in their relationship when Maithili saves Raghav from an unnecessary misunderstanding and helps him to reach his venue of interview on time. Thus, they become friends from being acquaintances.

On the other side, Jwala unbeknownst to Raghav takes his alliance for Maithili to the Tiwaris house where Arun Tiwari refuses to get his daughter married as he feels she is not yet ready to marry. He strongly believes Maithili needs to first focus on her career and become an independent woman in the society. However, Jwala has set her eyes on Arun Tiwari's wealth and reputation and wants her son to marry his daughter at any cost. Things turn in her favor when Maithili and Raghav get stuck in a riot and are found by their parents in an awkward situation. Soon, Maithili and Raghav's alliance is fixed by the two families.

The show ended on a positive note with Jwala accepting Maithili as her bahu and family reuniting with Maithili and Raghav's union.

== Cast ==
=== Main ===
- Simran Pareenja as Maithili Raghav Kumar (née Tiwari): Arun and Sadhna Tiwari's second daughter (adopted), Bhavana and Aarti's sister, Raghav's wife, a woman with extraordinary intelligence
- Akshit Sukhija as DC Raghav Kumar: Jwala and Mangilal's elder son, Rani, Chanchal and Buchi's brother, Maithili's husband, a hardworking man and a devoted son
- Ananya Khare as Jwala Devi Kumar: Mangilal's wife, Raghav, Rani, Chanchal and Buchi's mother, Baksa's elder sister and an extremely greedy and cunning woman who wants to satisfy all her greed using her son Raghav.
- Kavita Kaushik as Baksa Mausi: Jwala's younger sister and Raghav, Rani, Chanchal and Buchi's maternal aunt

=== Recurring ===
- Amit Behl as Mangilal Kumar: Raghav, Rani, Chanchal and Buchi's father
- Neetu Pachori as Rani: Raghav, Chanchal and Buchi's elder sister, Bhanu's wife
- Mayank Nishchal as Chanchal Kumar: Raghav, Rani and Buchi's brother
- Smita Sharan as Buchi Kumar: Raghav, Rani and Chanchal's younger sister
- Ashish Kaul as Officer. Arun Tiwari: Sadhna's husband, Maithili, Bhavana and Aarti's father
- Anindita Chatterjee as Sadhna Tiwari: Maithili, Bhavana and Aarti's mother
- Anushka Merchande as Aarti Tiwari: Arun and Sadhna Tiwari's youngest daughter, Maithili and Bhavana's younger sister
- Diksha Dhami as Bhavana: Arun and Sadhna Tiwari's eldest daughter, Maithili and Aarti's elder sister
- Jay Vijay Sachan as Reporter: Bhavana's husband
- Ram Mehar Jangra as Bhanu: Rani's husband
- Munendra Singh Kushwah as Shukla : Raghav's PA

== Production ==
=== Development ===
Earlier the show was titled as Bahu Kya Laayi Hai?, however during the final stages of production the title was changed to Lakshmi Ghar Aayi. The show was finalised by the channel and makers in December 2020 and the filming began in late January 2021 in Film City, Mumbai.

=== Release ===
The first promo of the series was shot on 31 January 2021 and was released on 17 March 2021, featuring Simran Pareenja and all the cast members that represent the Kumar family. The show was supposed to start in the month of April, however, it was halted for a period of three months due to the COVID-19 pandemic. It started broadcasting from 5 July 2021 at 8:00 PM on Star Bharat.

=== Casting ===
Jatin Suri was initially approached to play Raghav's younger brother Chanchal Kumar. He also featured in the first promo of the show. However, he was later replaced by Mayank Nishchal.
