= Simran Pareenja =

Indian actress

- Occupation: Actress
- Years active: 2015–2022
- Known for: Bhagyalakshmi; Kaala Teeka

Simran Pareenja is an Indian actress who primarily works in Hindi television. She made her acting debut in 2015 with Tu Mera Hero portraying Rajni. Pareenja is best known for her portrayal of Bhoomi Shukla Prajapati in Bhagyalakshmi and her dual portrayal of Kaali Nandu Singh and Thakurain Pavitra in Kaala Teeka.

Pareenja made her film debut in 2018 with the Telugu film Kirrak Party.

== Career ==
Pareenja made her acting debut in 2015 with Tu Mera Hero portraying Rajni. She then portrayed Bhoomi Shukla Prajapati opposite Varun Sharma in Bhagyalakshmi in 2015.

From 2015 to 2017, she portrayed Kaali Nandu Singh opposite Mayank Gandhi and Rohan Gandotra in Kaala Teeka. It proved as a major turning point in her career. She portrayed her character's on-screen daughter Thakurain Pavitra Sinha opposite Karan Sharma in 2017.

Pareenja made her film debut in 2018 with the Telugu film Kirrak Party, portraying Meera Joseph opposite Nikhil Siddharth. It received mixed reviews from the critics. The same year, she portrayed Nayan opposite Jay Soni in an episode of Laal Ishq.

From 2019 to 2020, she portrayed Gunjan Sharma Shrivastava in Ishaaron Ishaaron Mein opposite Mudit Nayar. In 2021, she portrayed Maithili Tiwari Kumar in Lakshmi Ghar Aayi opposite Akshit Sukhija. It ended within two months due to COVID-19 pandemic.

Pareenja will next appear in the Telugu films Ee Kathalo Nenu alongside Homanand and Revanth and Nuvvakkada Nenikkada alongside Parvatheesam. She has completed her shoot for both the films.

== Filmography ==
=== Films ===
Key
†	Denotes films that have not yet been released

- All films are in Telugu unless otherwise noted.

Year	Title	Role	Notes	Ref.
2018	Kirrak Party	Meera Joseph		
TBA	Ee Kathalo Nenu †	TBA	Completed	
TBA	Nuvvakkada Nenikkada †	TBA	Completed	

=== Television ===
Year	Serial	Role	Notes	Ref.
2015	Tu Mera Hero	Rajni		
2015	Bhagyalakshmi	Bhoomi Shukla Prajapati		
2016–2017	Kaala Teeka	Kaali Nandu Singh		
2017	Kaala Teeka	Thakurain Pavitra Sinha		
2018	Laal Ishq	Nayan	Episode: "Best Friend"	
2019–2020	Ishaaron Ishaaron Mein	Gunjan Sharma Shrivastava		
2021	Lakshmi Ghar Aayi	Maithili Tiwari Kumar		

== See also ==
- List of Indian television actresses
