= Bloody Mary (2022 film) =

2022 film by Chandoo Mondeti

- Promotional poster
- Directed by: Chandoo Mondeti
- Written by: Prashanth Kumar Dimmala
- Produced by: T. G. Vishwa Prasad
- Starring: Nivetha Pethuraj; Brahmaji; Ajay; Kireeti Damaraju
- Cinematography: Karthik Gattamneni
- Edited by: Viplav Nyshadam
- Music by: Kaala Bhairava
- Production company: People Media Factory
- Distributed by: Aha
- Release date: 14 April 2022
- Running time: 91 minutes
- Country: India
- Language: Telugu

Bloody Mary is a 2022 Indian Telugu-language crime drama film directed by Chandoo Mondeti, written by Prasanth Kumar Dimmala and produced by People Media Factory. It stars Nivetha Pethuraj, Brahmaji, Ajay, and Kireeti Damaraju. Set in Visakhapatnam, the plot follows three orphaned childhood friends—Mary, Raju, and Basha who find themselves embroiled in a murder case.

The film began its production in September 2020 in Hyderabad. It features music composed by Kaala Bhairava and cinematography by Karthik Ghattamneni. Bloody Mary is digitally released on 14 April 2022 on the streaming platform Aha.

== Plot ==
One night in 1993, in Vizag, an orphanage is attacked by a group of human traffickers. The director of the orphanage is killed and all the kids from the orphanage are abducted, except for three kids with physical impairments - Mary, Basha, and Raju. Mary is the daughter of the orphanage's director, and she overhears her mother's death. Since she did not actually see the crime, the police do not register her witness statement.

A few years later, Mary is working at a hospital while taking care of Basha and Raju. Basha, who is mute, has aspirations of becoming an actor. Raju, who is deaf, dreams of becoming a photographer. One day, Kantha Rao, a doctor working at the same hospital Mary is, calls Mary for an opportunity she has been looking for. When she reaches the place he told her about, he makes improper sexual advances toward her which she resists. In the ensuing scuffle, Mary pushes him, causing his death. Meanwhile, the same day, Basha witnesses a similar death when he goes to a film director's office to audition for a role. The director tries to sexually assault Kala, an aspiring actress, who retaliates by hitting him over the head until he dies. A little later, Raju finds a camera that he brings home. There, the three of them find a video of the death Basha witnessed earlier. They also find out that the director was killed by Kala's husband, Prabhakar, who followed her out of suspicion that she was cheating on their marriage.

Prabhakar, who is a local Circle Inspector (CI), starts investigating the death of Kantha Rao. He is suspicious of Mary and interrogates her, Basha and Raju. Mary sketches a plan and together with Bash and Raju, anonymously blackmails Prabhakar for money in exchange for the video of him killing the film director. But he tracks down the blackmail call to the three and destroys the evidence. He also learns that Mary is partially blind. But Mary bluffs and convinces Prabhakar that she has transferred the video onto another computer. Knowing that Prabhakar is at loggerheads with Sekhar Babu, a powerful local businessman in the fishing industry, Mary reaches out to Sekhar Babu and offers him the evidence in exchange for their safety. She meets Kala and gets her to confess to the truth on camera by bluffing she has evidence against her. Mary also realises that Sekhar Babu is a human trafficker, was the one who killed her mother, and is now planning on trafficking her, Basha and Raju's organs. She calls Prabhakar and cleverly pits him against Sekhar Babu. In the ensuing fight, Prabhakar kills most of Sekhar Babu's henchmen, while Mary kills Sekhar Babu.

Eight years later, Mary, under a new alias Devi, heads a very powerful social welfare organisation in Mumbai, with many unproven allegations of crime. The government appoints Prabhakar, who was awarded a President's Police Medal for ending Sekhar Babu's trafficking ring, to investigate the organisation. The film ends with Prabhakar meeting Mary, who details her rise and threatens him not to interfere in her business. Which shows she interests on politics hints towards a sequel titles "The rise of Bloody Devi".

== Cast ==
- Nivetha Pethuraj as Mary AKA Devi.
- Brahmaji as Sekhar Babu
- Ajay as CI Prabhakar
- Kireeti Damaraju as Basha
- Rajkumar Kasireddy as Raju
- Pammi Sai as Appi
- Naveena Reddy as Kala

== Production and release ==
The film began its production in September 2020 in Hyderabad. Blood Mary is director Chandoo Mondeti's first foray into the digital medium. It is released digitally on 14 April 2022 on the streaming platform Aha.

== Reception ==
The Times of India critic Neeshita Nyayapati called it a "passable thriller" writing, "Bloody Mary falls short of being a complex and grey film because it doesn't go the extra mile to tell a novel story." She appreciated the performances of Pethuraj and Ajay, in addition to the technical aspects of the film. Reviewing the film for The Hindu, Sangeetha Devi called it "sketchy," criticising the narration and weak characterization.

Subbarao N of NTV criticized the story and screenplay while being appreciative of the performances, score and camerawork.
