= Chandoo Mondeti =

Indian film director

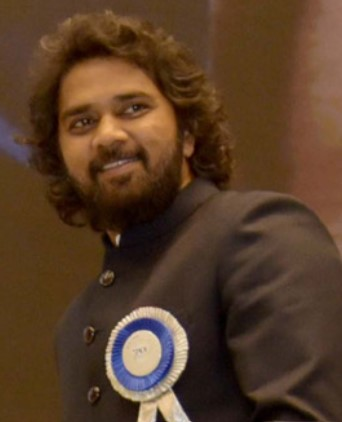
- Chandoo in 2024
- Born: Kovvuru, Andhra Pradesh, India
- Occupations: Film director; Screenwriter
- Spouse: Sujatha
- Children: 2

Chandoo Mondeti is an Indian film director and screenwriter who works in Telugu cinema. His successful films include Karthikeya (2014), Premam (2016), Karthikeya 2 (2022) and Thandel (2025). He is the recipient of a National Film Award and a Nandi Award.

== Early life and career ==
Chandoo Mondeti was born in Vemuluru near Kovvur in Andhra Pradesh.

He debuted as a director with Karthikeya in 2014. It was a mystery thriller film starring Nikhil Siddhartha and Swathi Reddy in the lead roles. The film revolves showcases the life of a curious medico Karthik who investigates the mystery surrounding a closed Karthikeya temple in the village of Subrahmanyapuram. An incident which happened in Talupulamma Temple in Kakinada district of Andhra Pradesh inspired Chandoo to pen the story of Karthikeya. The film released on 24 October 2014 as a Diwali release to positive reviews from critics, and collected more than ₹20 crore, on a budget of ₹4–6 crore.

He then directed Premam (2016), a remake of 2015 Malayalam film of the same name. The film was commercially successful. Later he directed Savyasachi (2018) starring Naga Chaitanya and Madhavan (in his Telugu debut) which did not perform well at the box office.

He later directed the crime drama film Bloody Mary (2022) stars Nivetha Pethuraj, Brahmaji, Ajay, and Kireeti Damaraju. Set in Visakhapatnam, the plot follows three orphaned childhood friends—Mary, Raju, and Basha who find themselves embroiled in a murder case. The film was digitally released in April 2022 on the streaming platform Aha.

His next project Karthikeya 2, the sequel to Karthikeya, was officially launched in March 2020 in Tirupati with a puja ceremony. Filming took place in India, predominantly in Gujarat and Himachal Pradesh, in addition to Spain, Portugal, and Greece in Europe. It starred Nikhil Siddhartha, Anupama Parameswaran, and Anupam Kher in prominent roles. Karthikeya 2 was released in August 2022 and received positive reviews from critics and became the highest-grossing film in Chandoo's career.

He has collaborated with Chaitanya for the third time in Thandel, with Sai Pallavi playing the lead actress. It was released in February 2025.

== Filmography ==
Year	Title	Director	Writer	Ref
2014	Karthikeya	Yes	Yes	
2015	Surya vs Surya	No	Dialogues	
2016	Premam	Yes	Yes	
2018	Kirrak Party	No	Dialogues	
2018	Savyasachi	Yes	Yes	
2022	Bloody Mary	Yes	Yes	
2022	Karthikeya 2	Yes	Yes	
2025	Thandel	Yes	Yes	
TBA	Vayuputra	Yes	Yes	Animated Sci fi film

== Awards and nominations ==
Award	Year	Category	Work	Result	Ref.
Filmfare Awards South	2015	Best Director – Telugu	Karthikeya	Nominated	
IIFA Utsavam	2016	Best Director – Telugu	Karthikeya	Nominated	
Nandi Awards	2014	Best First Film of a Director	Karthikeya	Won	
National Film Awards	2024	Best Telugu Feature Film	Karthikeya 2	Won	
South Indian International Movie Awards	2015	Best Debut Director – Telugu	Karthikeya	Nominated	
South Indian International Movie Awards	2023	Best Director – Telugu	Karthikeya 2	Nominated	
South Indian International Movie Awards	2023	Sensation of the Year	Karthikeya 2	Won	
