= Nikhil Siddhartha =

Indian actor (born 1985)

- Born: 1 June 1985 (age 41); Vijayawada, Andhra Pradesh, India
- Other name: Nikhil
- Education: Muffakham Jah College of Engineering and Technology, Hyderabad
- Occupation: Actor
- Years active: 2003–present
- Known for: Happy Days, Karthikeya, Ekkadiki Pothavu Chinnavada, Karthikeya 2
- Children: 1
- Awards: SIIMA Award for Best Actor – Telugu (nominee)

Nikhil Siddhartha (born 1 June 1985) is an Indian actor and producer who works predominantly in Telugu cinema. He began his career with supporting roles in films such as Sambaram (2003) and Hyderabad Nawabs (2006) before earning recognition as one of the four leads in Happy Days (2007), which became a major critical and commercial success and marked his breakthrough role.

Following this, Siddhartha established himself as a prominent actor in Telugu films with a series of commercially successful projects, including Yuvatha (2008), Aalasyam Amrutham (2010), Swamy Ra Ra (2013), Karthikeya (2014), Surya vs Surya (2015), Ekkadiki Pothavu Chinnavada (2016), Keshava (2017), and Arjun Suravaram (2019). His performance in Karthikeya 2 (2022) earned him widespread acclaim and established him as one of the most bankable young stars in Telugu cinema.

In addition to acting, Siddhartha ventured into film production and worked on pan-Indian projects such as Spy (2023). Over a career spanning more than two decades, he has appeared in over 25 films across various genres, primarily thrillers and mystery dramas. Known for portraying intellectually driven and morally complex characters, Siddhartha has been credited with bringing innovative scripts to mainstream Telugu cinema.

== Early life ==
Nikhil Siddhartha was born in Begumpet, a neighbourhood of Hyderabad of present-day Telangana, India, into a Yadava family. His father, Kavali Shyam Siddhartha, hails from Mahbubnagar in Telangana. Nikhil completed his schooling from Hyderabad Public School, where he was classmates with Rana Daggubati, Ram Charan, and Sharwanand. He later graduated from Muffakham Jah College of Engineering and Technology. His father suffered from a rare disease, corticobasal degeneration, for eight years before dying on 28 April 2022.

== Career ==
Nikhil started out as an assistant director for the film Hyderabad Nawabs (2006). He played minor roles in various films before being cast in Happy Days (2007). Directed by Sekhar Kammula, Nikhil played one of the four leads in the film. He was paid a remuneration of ₹25,000 for his role in the film and he still keeps the check with him. Happy Days was one among the few low-budget films made in 2007 that became one of the most successful movies in that year.

His first film as a solo lead was Ankit, Pallavi & Friends (2008). He next appeared in films like Yuvatha (2008), Kalavar King (2010), Aalasyam Amrutam (2010), and Veedu Theda (2011).

His 2013 film Swamy Ra Ra became a commercial success and marked a new phase in his career where he started picking distinct scripts rather than run-of-the-mill commercial films. His next film, titled Karthikeya (2014) was a critical and commercial success. Made on a budget of ₹4–6 crore, it collected more than ₹20 crore at the box office.

In 2017, Nikhil once again teamed up with Swamy Ra Ra Director Sudheer Varma for Keshava which is a revenge drama where Nikhil plays a character with a rare congenital disorder Dextrocardia, who wants to avenge the death of his family. The film released on 19 May 2017 and received positive reviews for Nikhil's performance, musical score, visuals, and backdrop of the plot.

His next film Kirrak Party (2018), a remake of Kannada Kirik Party (2016) opposite Samyuktha Hegde and Simran Pareenja, was a college campus film directed by Sharan Koppisetty. The film underperformed at the box office. The film's screenplay was written by Sudheer Varma and dialogues were penned by Chandoo Mondeti. His next film Arjun Suravaram released in 2019 and was successful. With the 2022 film Karthikeya 2, Nikhil entered the 100 Crore Club.

== Personal life ==
Nikhil married Pallavi Varma on 14 May 2020. They have one child.

== Media image ==
Siddhartha has frequently appeared in media lists recognizing popular and influential actors in Telugu cinema. He was featured in the Hyderabad Times' "30 Most Desirable Men" list, ranking 28th in 2018, 22nd in 2019, and 19th in 2020.

== Filmography ==
Key
†	Denotes films that have not yet been released

- All films are in Telugu, unless otherwise noted.

List of Nikhil Siddhartha film credits
Year	Title	Role(s)	Notes	Ref.
2003	Sambaram	Car driver	Uncredited	
2006	Hyderabad Nawabs	College Boy	Deccani film Minor role; Also assistant director	
2007	Happy Days	Rajesh	Debut as lead actor	
2008	Ankit, Pallavi & Friends	Ankit		
2008	Yuvatha	Babu		
2010	Om Shanti	Teja		
2010	Kalavar King	Rajesh		
2010	Aalasyam Amrutam	Ram		
2011	Veedu Theda	'Katthi' Seenu		
2012	Disco	Disco		
2013	Donga Police			
2013	Swamy Ra Ra	Surya		
2014	Karthikeya	Karthik		
2015	Surya vs Surya	Surya		
2015	Sankarabharanam	Gautham		
2016	Ekkadiki Pothavu Chinnavada	Arjun		
2017	Keshava	Keshava		
2018	Kirrak Party	Krishna		
2019	Arjun Suravaram	Arjun Lenin Suravaram		
2022	Karthikeya 2	Karthik		
2022	18 Pages	Siddhu		
2023	Spy	Jai Vardhan		
2024	Appudo Ippudo Eppudo	Rishi		
2026	Swayambhu †	TBA	Filming	
TBA	The India House †	TBA	Filming	

== Accolades ==
List of awards and nominations received by Nikhil Siddhartha
Year	Award	Category	Work	Result	Ref.
2017	49th Cinegoers Awards	Youth Magical Star Of the Year	Keshava	Won	
2023	Iconic Gold Awards	Best Actor Popular	Karthikeya 2	Won	
2023	11th South Indian International Movie Awards	Best Actor – Telugu	Karthikeya 2	Nominated	
2023	11th South Indian International Movie Awards	Sensation of the Year	Karthikeya 2	Won	
2023	Gama Awards	Best Actor	Karthikeya 2	Won	
2023	OTT Play Awards	Trailblazer Of The Year	Karthikeya 2	Won	
