= Arjun Suravaram =

- Theatrical release poster
- Directed by: T. Santhosh
- Written by: T. Santhosh
- Based on: Kanithan (2016)
- Produced by: Rajkumar Akella
- Starring: Nikhil Siddharth; Lavanya Tripathi
- Cinematography: Suryaa
- Edited by: Naveen Nooli
- Music by: Sam C. S.
- Production company: Movie Dynamix LLP
- Release date: 29 November 2019
- Running time: 149 minutes
- Country: India
- Language: Telugu
- Budget: ₹10 crore
- Box office: est. ₹16–21 crore

Arjun Suravaram is a 2019 Indian Telugu-language action thriller film written and directed by T. Santhosh. The film stars Nikhil Siddharth and Lavanya Tripathi. It is produced by Rajkumar Akella, and presented by B. Madhu on the Movie Dynamix banner. Sam C. S. composed the film's music, while Naveen Nooli handled the editing and Suryaa handled the cinematography. It is a remake of the director's own Tamil film Kanithan (2016). The film released on 29 November 2019 after a series of delays, like the original Tamil film had faced. It received positive reviews from critics and was commercially successful.

== Plot ==
The film's story takes place in the backdrop of News television channels. The protagonist Arjun Suravaram (Nikhil Siddharth), is a third-generation journalist who takes to the profession despite opposition from his idealistic but now skeptical father (Nagineedu), who feels that the fourth estate has lost its moral compass in the present times and hence his son should stay away from journalism. Arjun nurses a deep desire and dream to become an investigative journalist with an international TV Channel of repute. However, as feared by his father, the young reporter gets himself trapped in a fake educational loan and certificate scam, which he must now unearth in order to prove his innocence and to help the society at large by cleansing the system of such evils. Kavya (Lavanya Tripathi) is Arjun's love interest, an aspiring journalist, and the daughter of the owner (Kedar Shankara) of a TV channel that Arjun works for. Together as they try to unravel the mystery of the scam, they discover that there is a far more sinister network beneath the surface, and their life is under grave threat from the evil forces.

== Cast ==
- Nikhil Siddharth as Arjun Lenin Suravaram, TV99 journalist
- Lavanya Tripathi as Kavya
- Tarun Arora as Tura Sarkar
- Vennela Kishore as Lawyer Addala Balaji
- Nagineedu as Arjun's father
- Pragathi as Arjun's mother
- Kedar Shankara as TV99 CEO, Kavya's father
- Posani Krishna Murali as Addala Subba Rao, Balaji's father
- Satya as Arjun's friend
- Vidyullekha Raman as Maid
- Kishore as Police Officer.
- Raja Ravindra as a Fake Police Officer and a henchman of Tura Sarkar
- Chatrapathi Sekhar
- Vatsan Chakravarthy as Siri, Tura Sarkar's son

== Soundtrack ==
Arjun Suravaram

Soundtrack album by Sam C. S.
- Released: 2019
- Recorded: 2019
- Genre: Feature film soundtrack
- Length: 17:09
- Label: Lahari Music/T-Series Telugu
- Producer: Sam C. S.

Sam C. S. chronology
Kaithi (2019)	Arjun Suravaram (2019)	Jada (2019)

Music is composed by Sam C. S., and released on Lahari Music/T-Series Telugu. "Kanne Kanne" and "Che Guevara" are covers of the songs with same title from the Tamil films Ayogya and Kanithan respectively, the latter of which this film is a remake of.

Track list
No.	Title	Lyrics	Singer(s)	Length
1.	"Kanne Kanne"	Sri Mani	Anurag Kulkarni, Chinmayi	4:50
2.	"Tikamaka Makatika"	Varikuppala Yadagiri	Benny Dayal	4:10
3.	"Bang Bang"	Varikuppala Yadagiri, Spike (Spike Universe)	Sam C. S., Spike (Spike Universe)	3:29
4.	"Che Guevara"	Varikuppala Yadagiri	Shankar Mahadevan	4:40
Total length:				17:09

== Release ==
Initially, movie was titled as Mudra and was scheduled to release on 8 November 2018, after failing to release on 8 November, on 12 November 2018 it was announced the movie will be releasing on 28 December 2018, eventually failed to release. Meanwhile, on 25 January 2019, a movie with same title (Mudra) long delayed Jagapathi Babu's film was released. To avoid title conflict, title was changed to Arjun Suravaram and scheduled to release on 29 March 2019, later rescheduled due to financial problems and pushed to 1 May 2019, which eventually failed to release both the times. After many delays movie was released on 29 November 2019.

== Reception ==
=== Box office ===
On the opening day, Arjun Suravaram grossed ₹4.1 crore, and ₹12.3 crore in the first weekend worldwide. In its lifetime, Arjun Suravaram grossed ₹21 crore at the global box office.

=== Critical reception ===
Arjun Suravaram received positive reviews from critics. Deccan Chronicle gave 3 out of 5 stars stating, "Arjun Suravaram deserves to be watched. The director should be appreciated for taking up a topical issue, that of fake certificates. Nikhil Siddharth, as the investigative reporter, puts in a sincere performance, and he is convincing. Cinematography by Surya is good, and the action scenes are choreographed nicely". Sangeetha Devi Dundoo of The Hindu wrote, "The film is engrossing when it focuses on its main plot. Nikhil has the knack for choosing interesting stories and effectively portrays the part of a purpose-driven reporter who is vulnerable when the tables turn against him. Lavanya as the aspiring journalist has a role that’s comparatively limited in scope, but she does it efficiently, and Sahi Suresh’s art direction and Suryaa’s cinematography deserve a mention."

123Telugu.com gave 3.25 stars stating "Arjun Suravaram is an engaging crime thriller with a novel concept. The thrills showcased, breezy narration, and Nikhil’s performance are basic assets. Nikhil’s long wait will surely pay dividends for him". Industryhit.com gave 3.25 stars stating "The message along with the thrills with uncompromising production values makes Arjun Suravaram a must-watch big-screen flick". Indiaglitz.com gave 3 out of 5 stars stating "The premise and storyline are exciting. Good performances and some nice technical output help. The Hans India gave 3 out of 5 stars stating "BGM and Nikhil are the highlights of the film".
