= Talupulamma Temple, Lova =

Hindu temple in India

Talupulamma Temple
- Location in Andhra Pradesh

Religion
- Affiliation: Hinduism
- District: Kakinada district
- Deity: Talupulamma Thalli
- Festivals: Annual Jatara; Ashada Masa Utsavams

Location
- Location: Lova
- State: Andhra Pradesh
- Country: India
- Interactive map of Talupulamma Temple
- Coordinates: 17.3739°N 82.4955°E

Architecture
- Type: Dravidian architecture

Talupulamma Temple (popularly known as Talupulamma Lova) is a Hindu pilgrimage site located in the village of Lova in Kakinada district of Andhra Pradesh, India. The presiding deity is a gramadevatha known as Talupulamma Thalli (lit. Goddess who grants wishes).

It is located between two heavily forested hillocks Darakonda and Teegakonda near the City of Tuni and has views of the valley. The temple is situated 5 km from Tuni, 65 km from Kakinada and 90 km from Visakhapatnam. The temple is also close to the Vaishnavite temple town of Annavaram (20 km).

== Poojas and festivals ==
The primary festival of the temple is the annual Jatara and the Ashada Masa Utsavams. The annual Jatara is celebrated from Chaitra Bahula Vidiya to Chaitra Bahula Amavasya for 15 days. Ashada Masa Utsavams are celebrated from Ashada Suddha Padyami to Ashada Bahula Amavasya every year. The temple follows Grama Devatha Agamas.

== Gallery ==
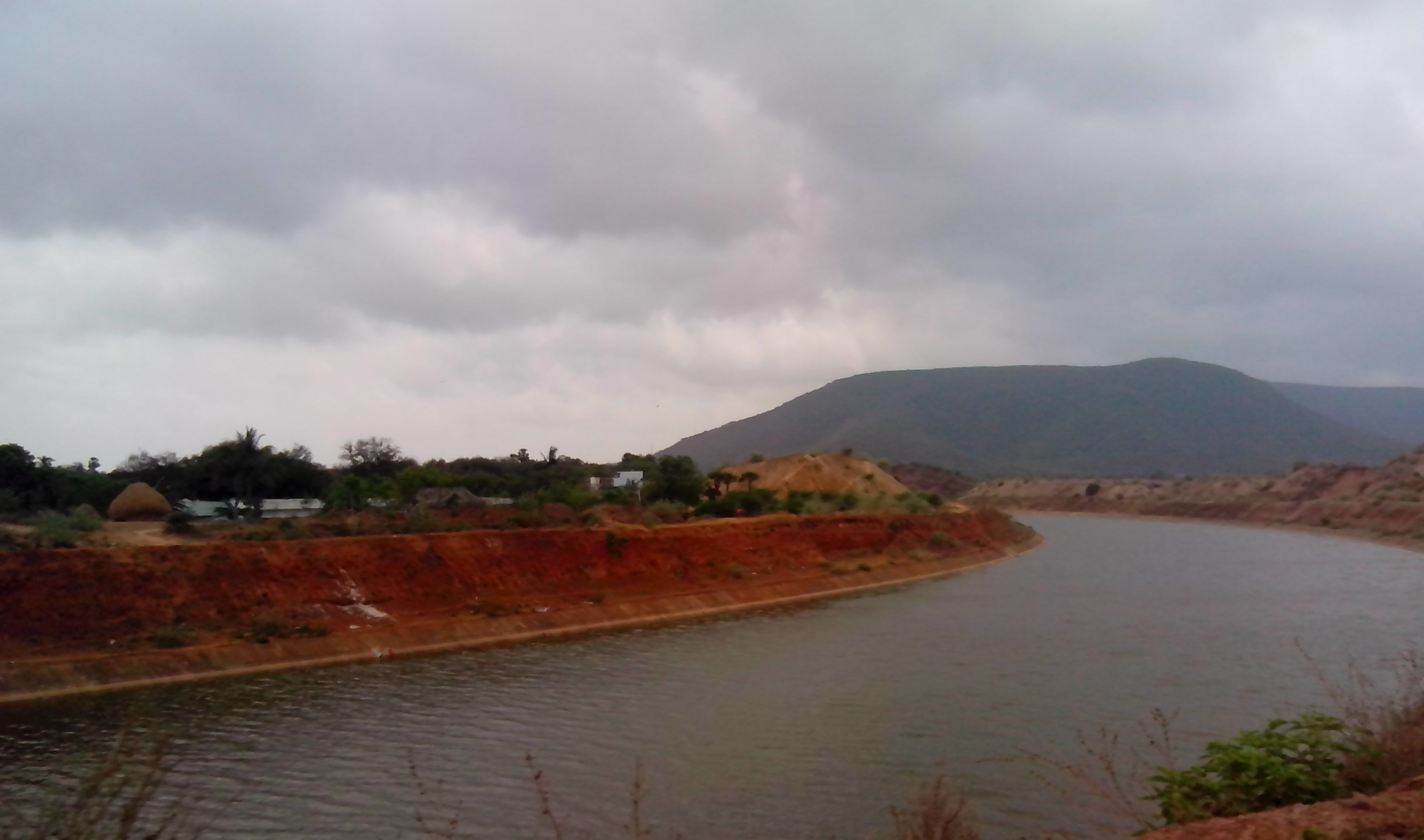

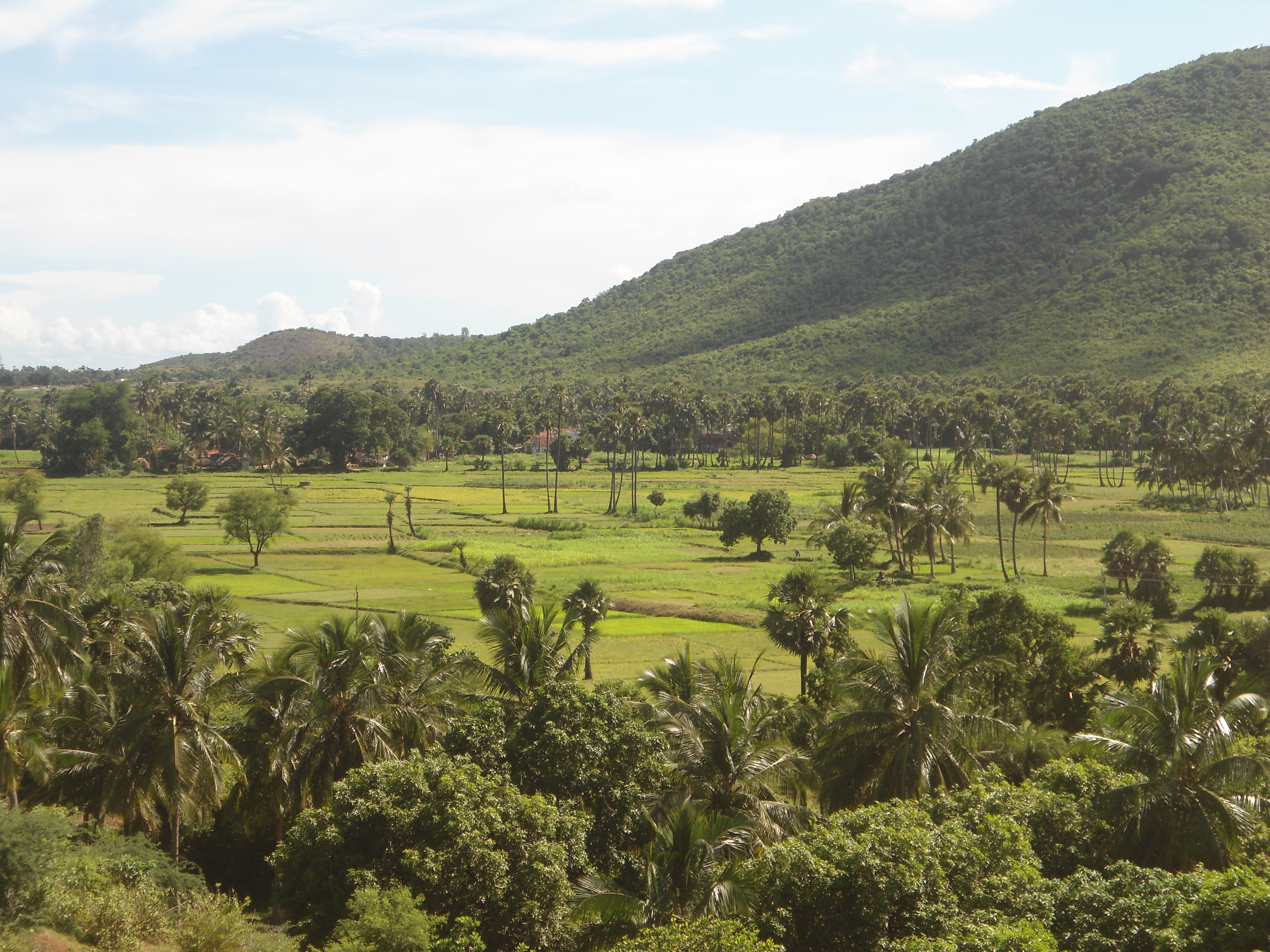

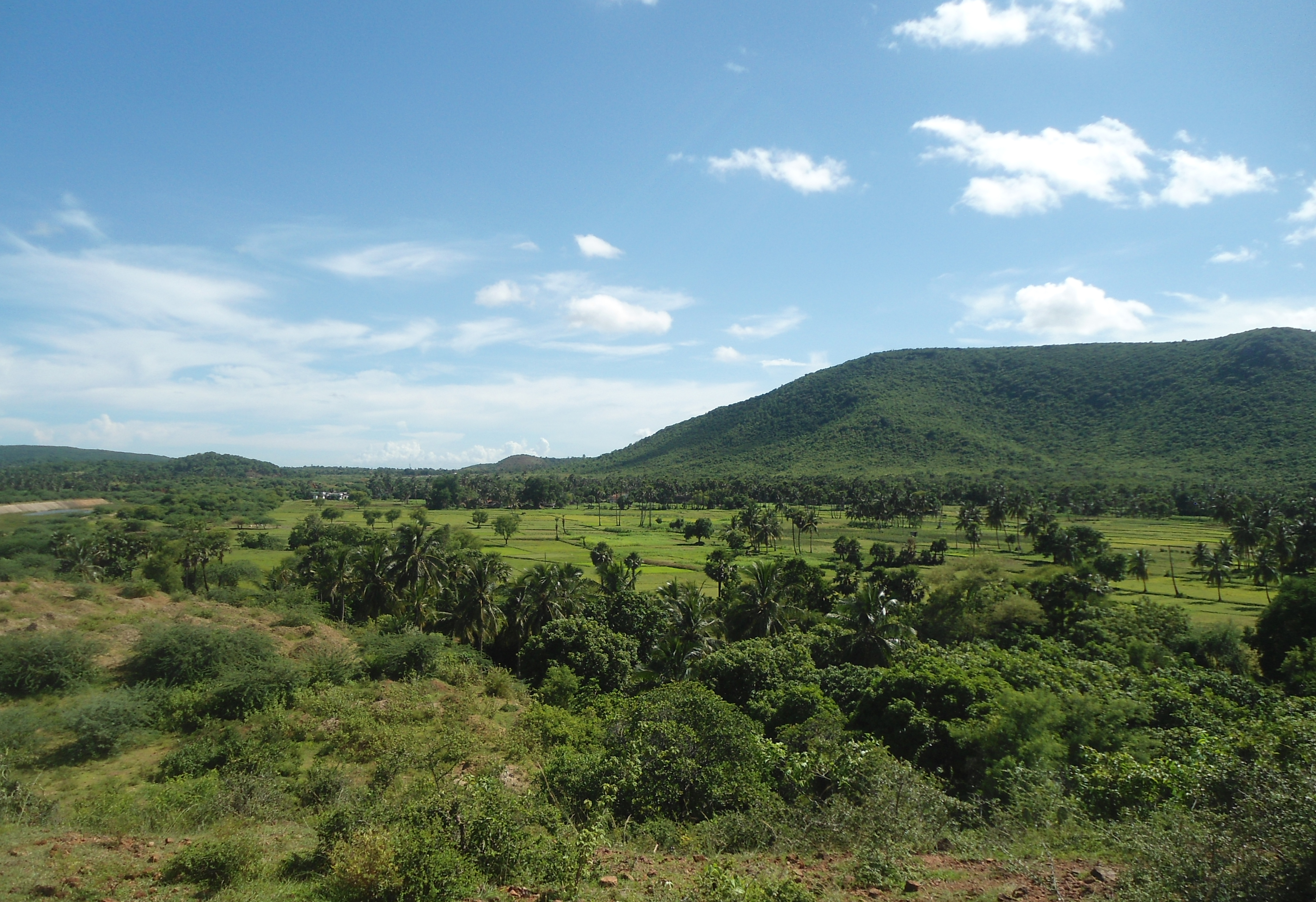

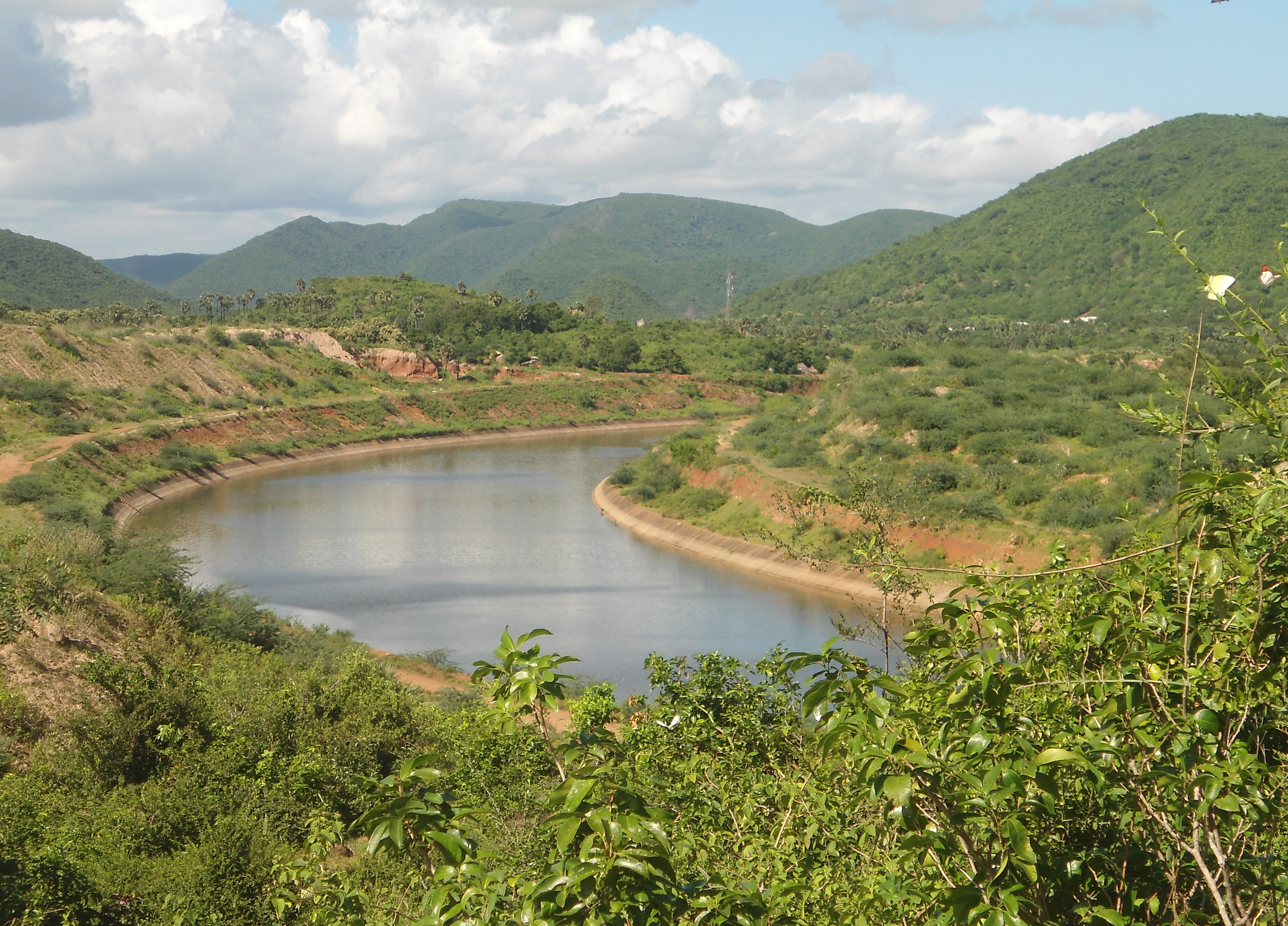

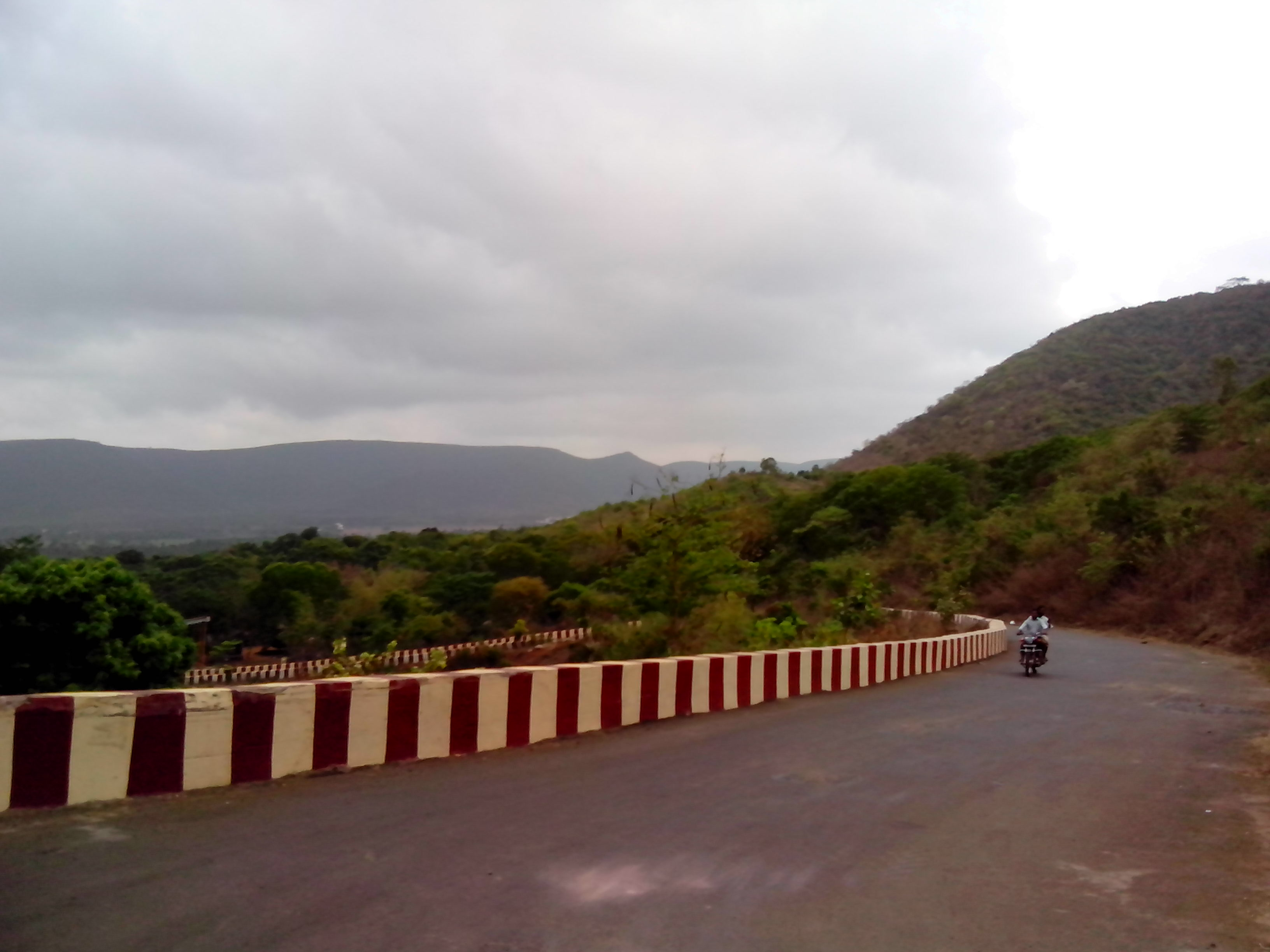

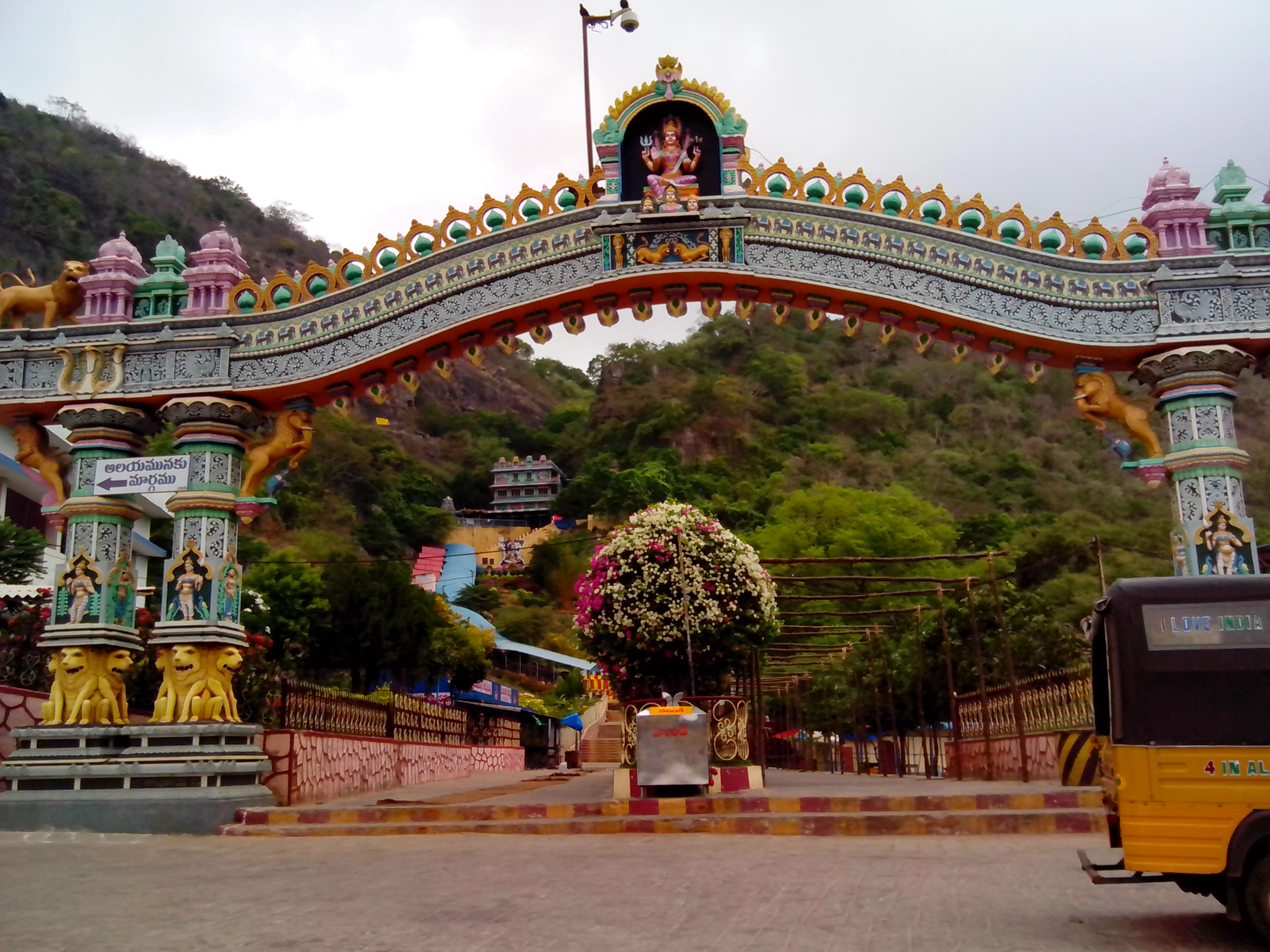

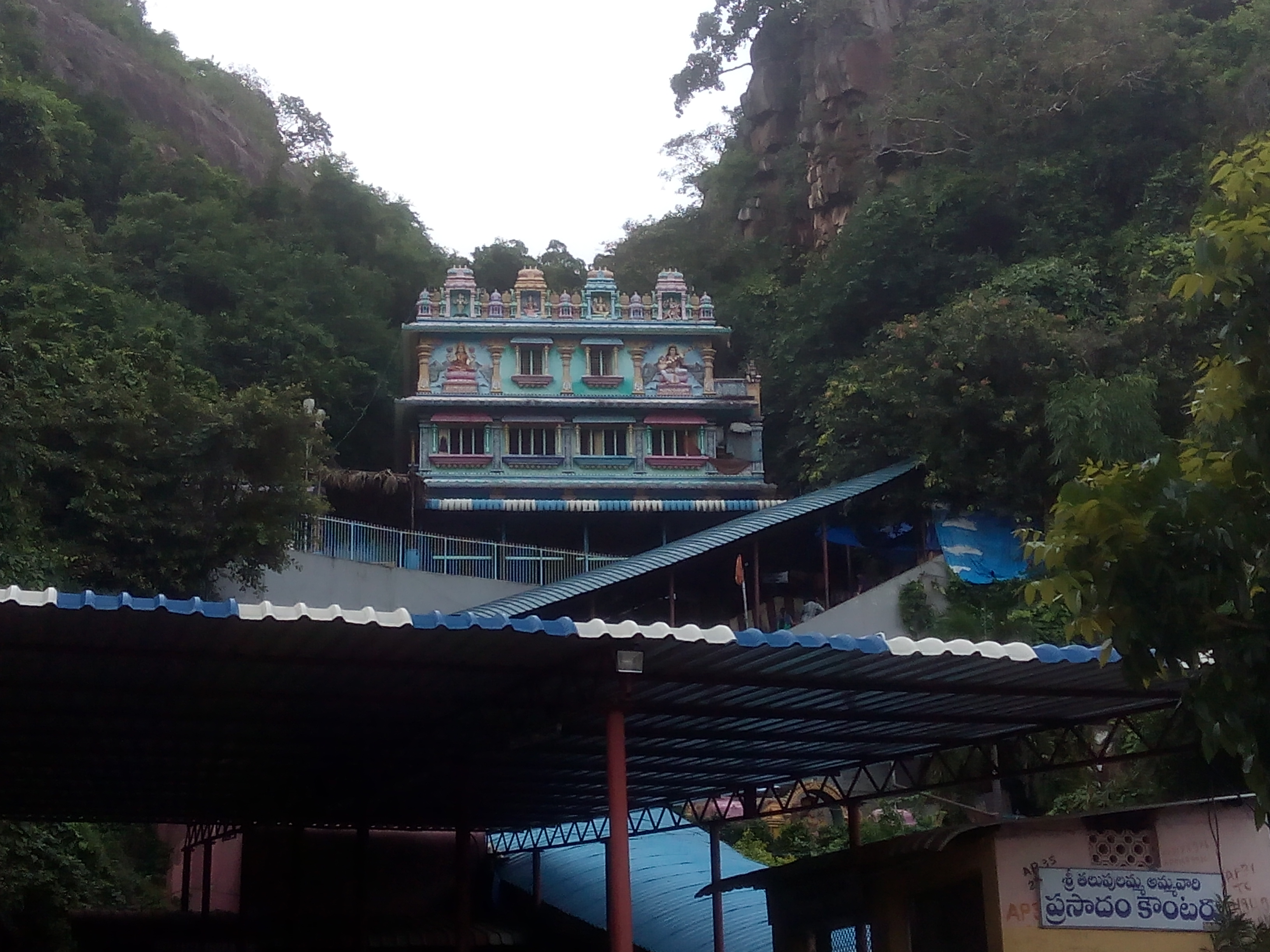

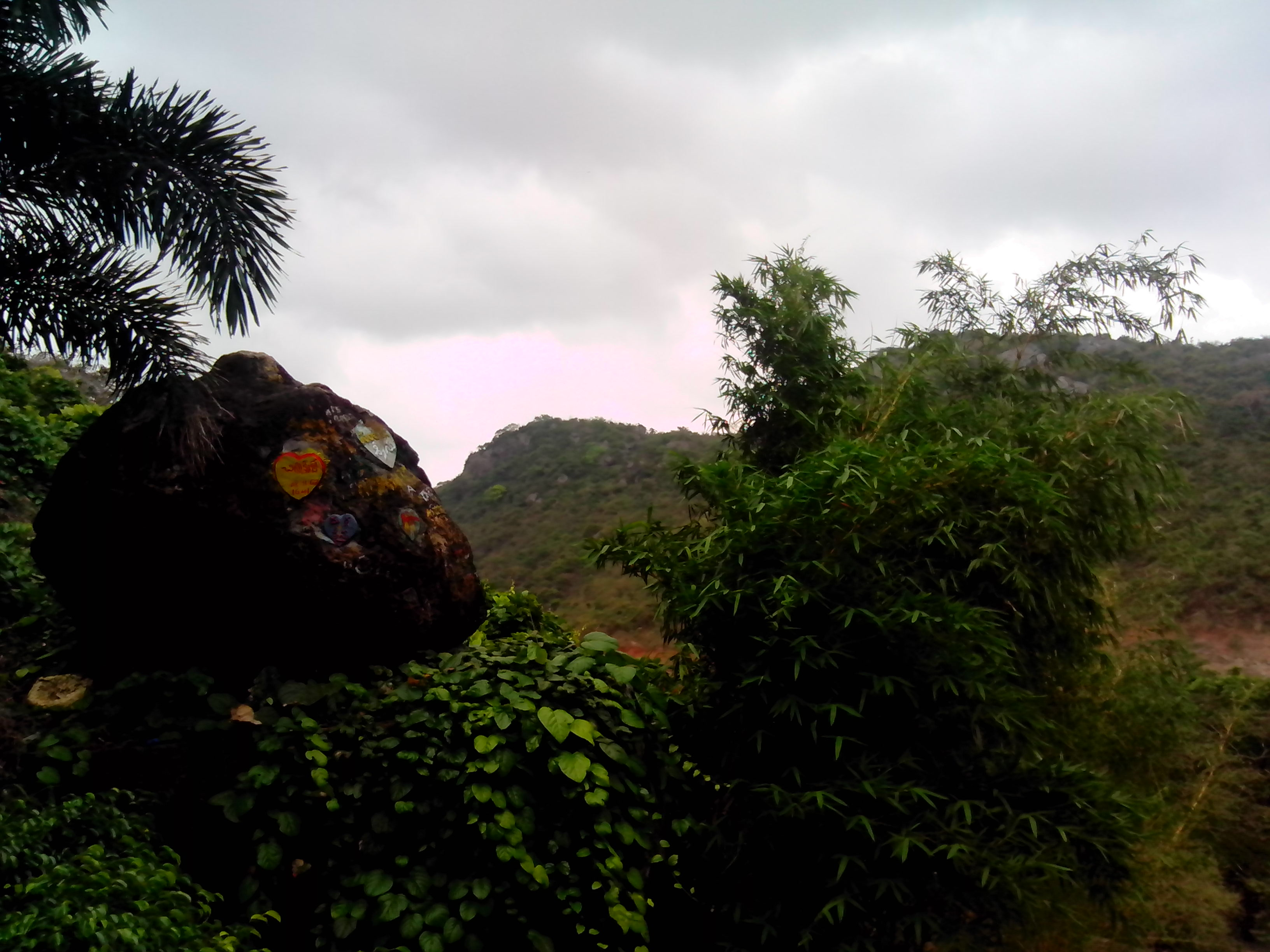

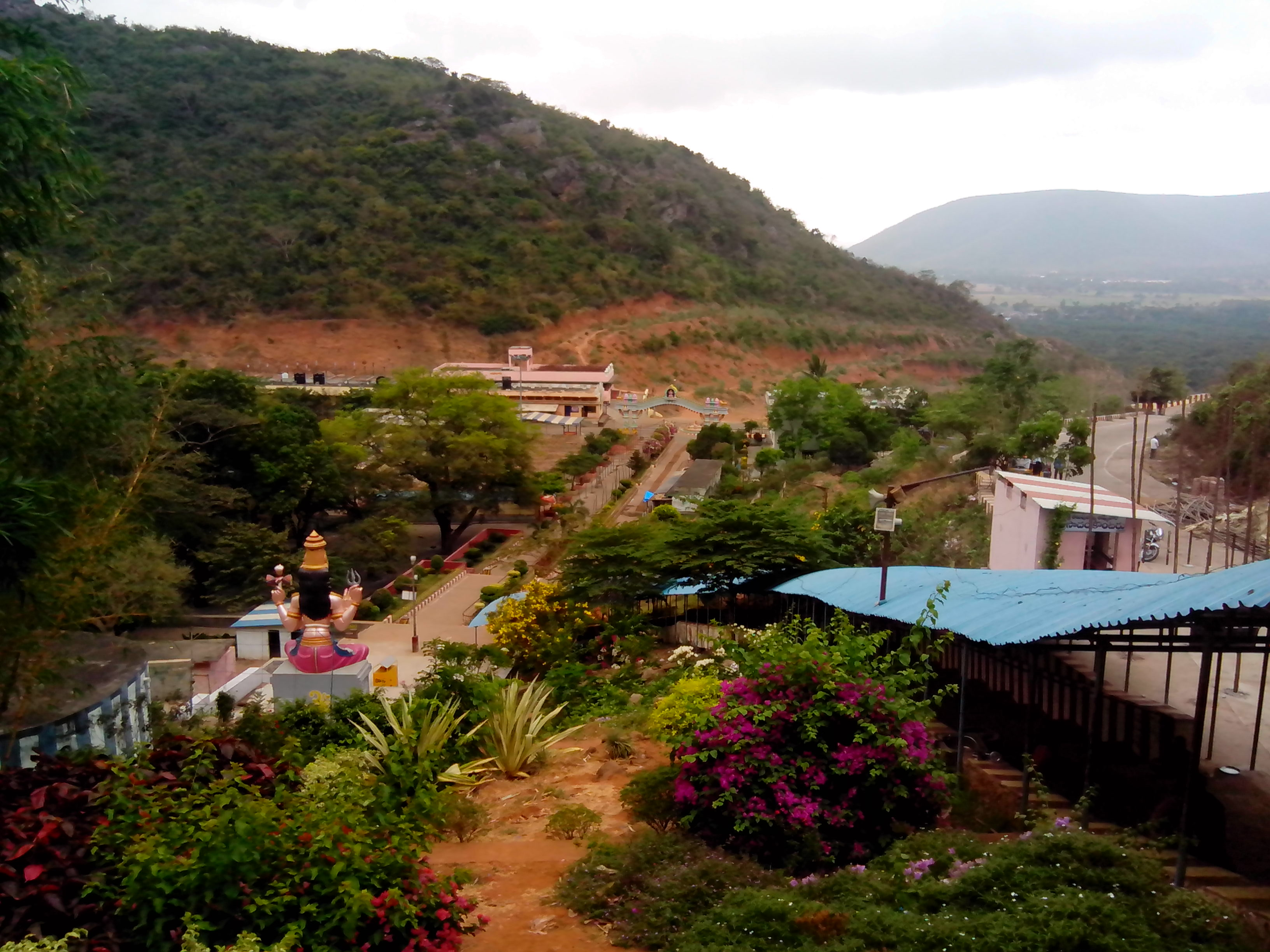

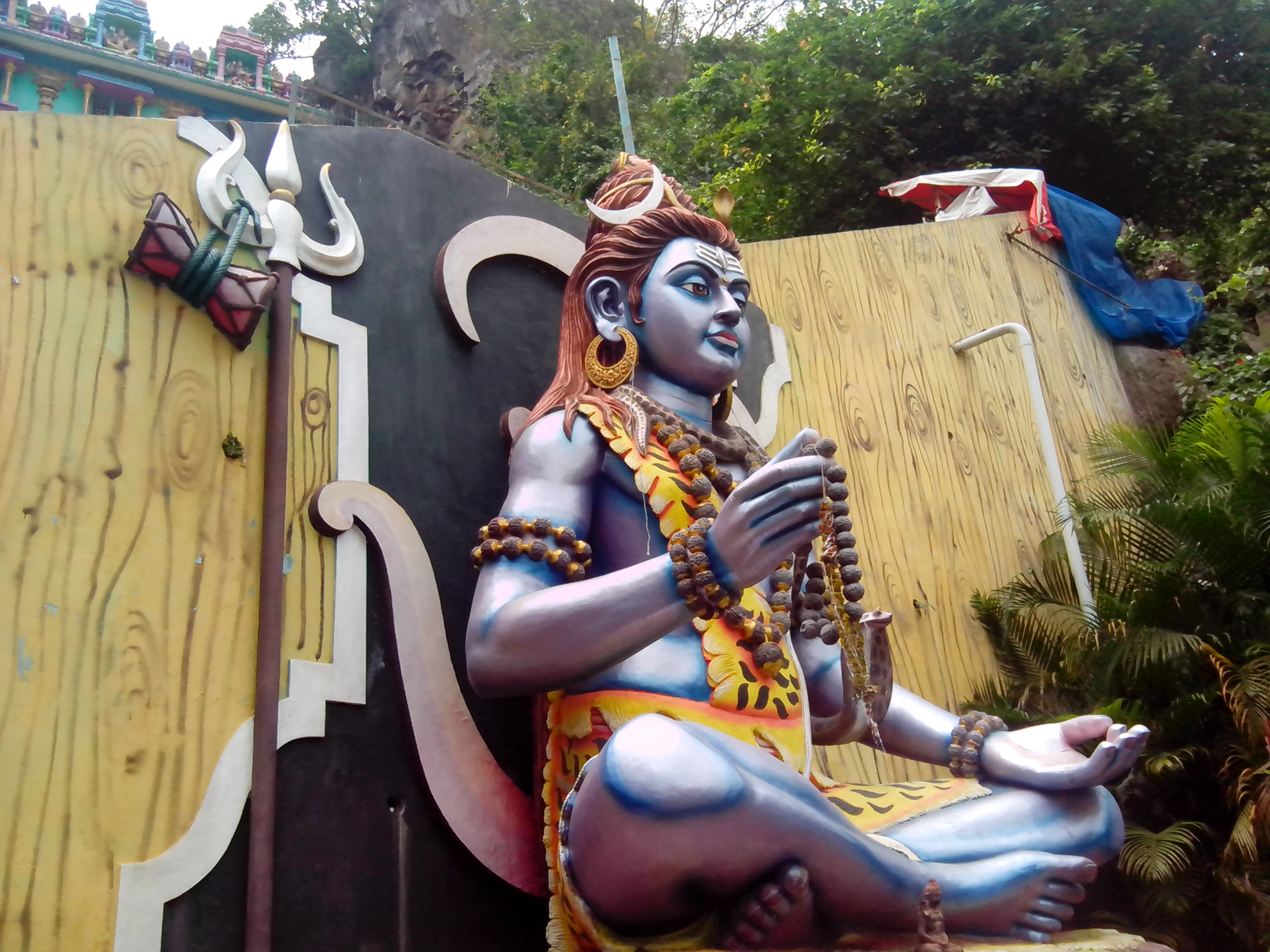

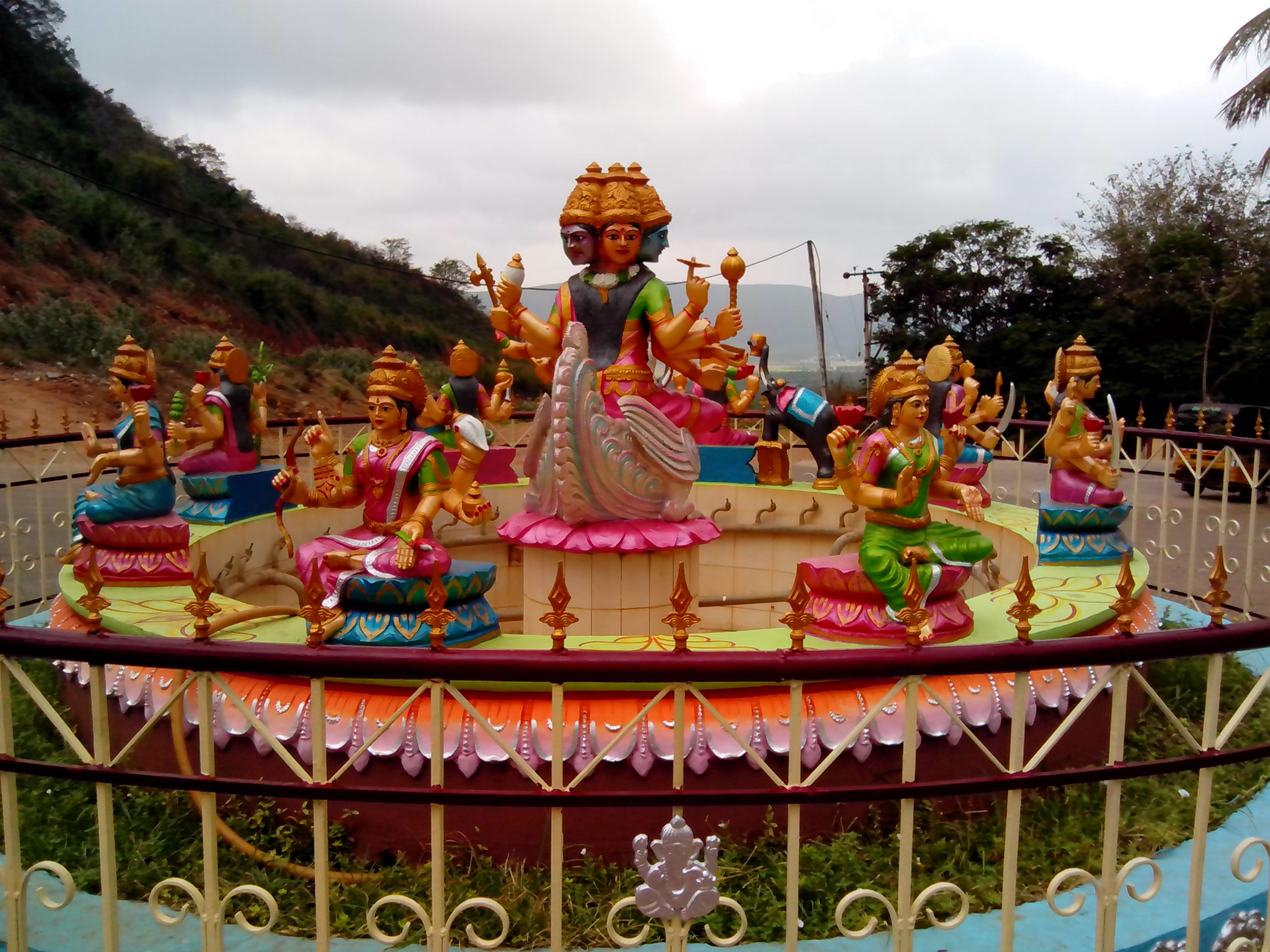

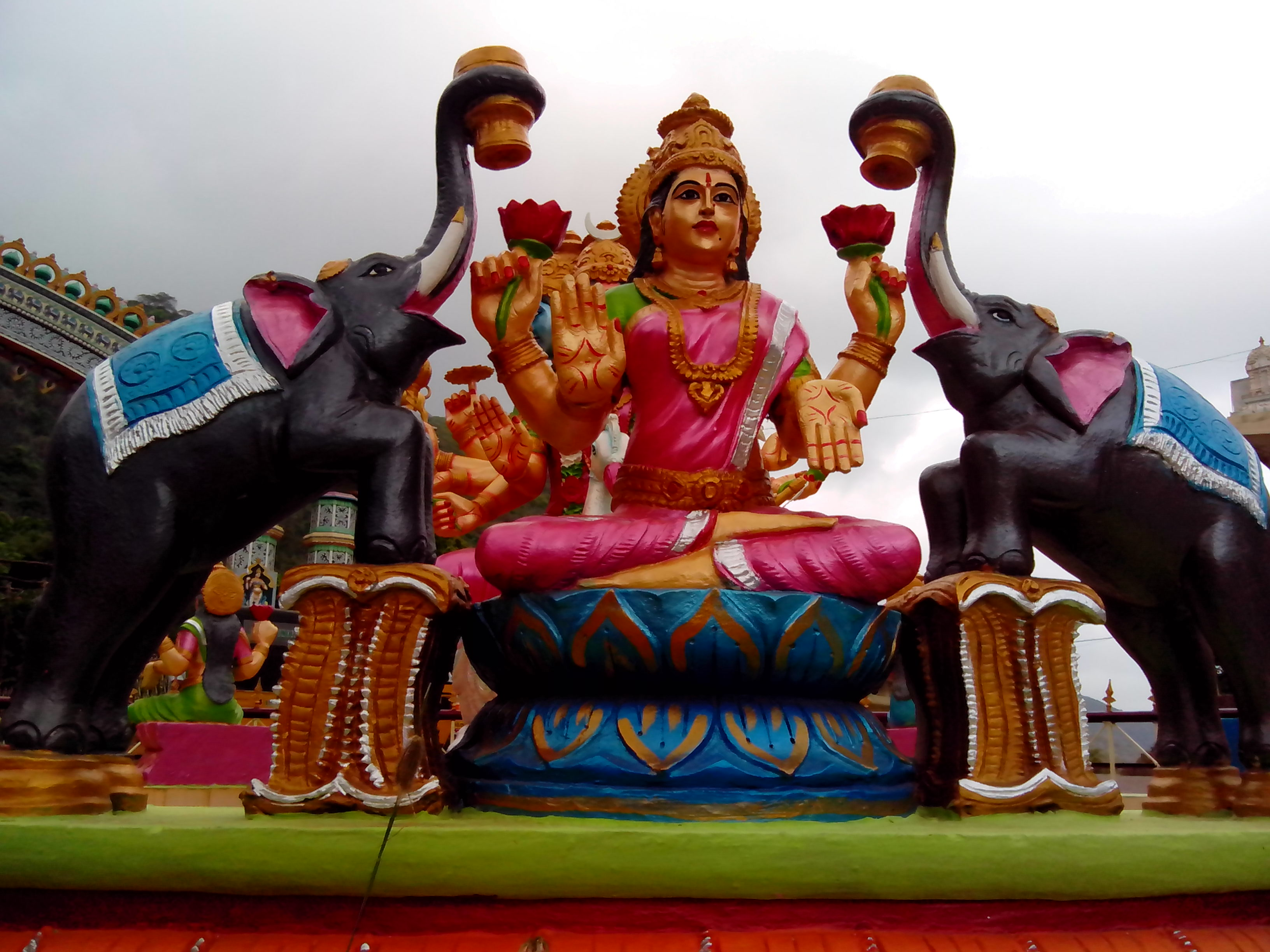
