= Giridhar =

Giridhar is an Indian given name and surname which means, "one who holds a mountain." Krishna was known by this name as a title after holding up Govardhan hill. Notable people with the name include:

- Giridhar Gamang (born 1943), Indian politician
- Giridhar Madras, Indian academic
- Giridhar Udupa, Indian musician
- Subhashni Giridhar, Indian dancer
