= Naveen Medaram =

Indian film director, producer and writer

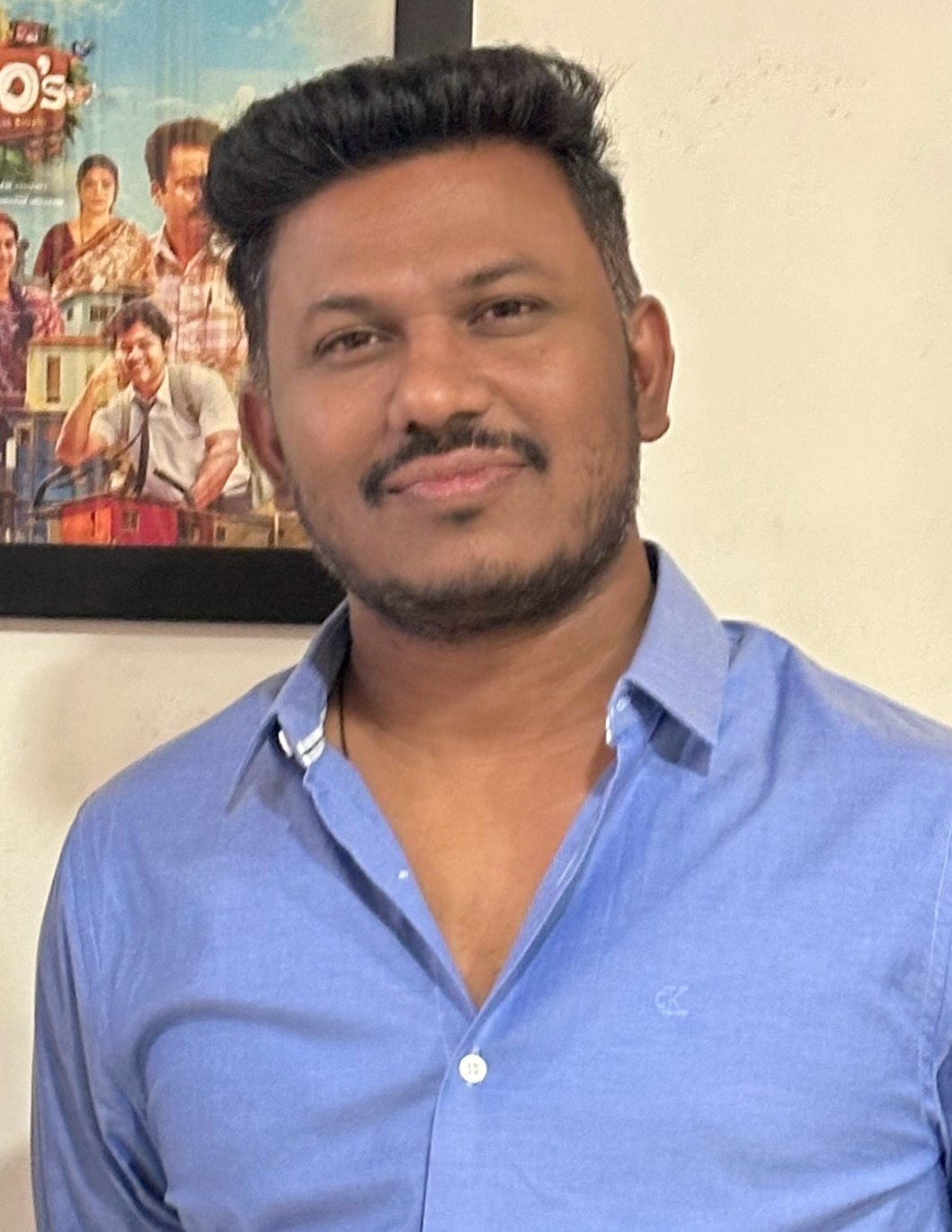
- Born: 1979 (age 45–46); Nizamabad, Telangana, India
- Occupation(s): Director; Writer; Producer
- Years active: 2006–present

Naveen Medaram is an Indian film director, producer, and writer. He started his career in Hollywood as a visual effects artist. After writing, directing and producing several British films, he made his Telugu industry debut with Babu Baga Busy, a remake of the Hindi film Hunterrr.

== Early career ==
Medaram received a filmmaking diploma from Raindance Film School and a master's degree in visual effects from Bournemouth University. He also has a Bachelor of Fine Arts from JNTU.

He began his career in Hollywood as a visual effects artist, working on feature films such as Pirates of Caribbean: On Stranger Tides, Prince of Persia: The Sands of Time, Les Misérables and The Dark Knight. After gaining experience in visual effects, Medaram transitioned to filmmaking, writing, directing and producing British films like Nice 2 Meet U and London Life, which both focused on the lives of young British Asians living in London. Medaram made his debut in the Telugu film industry with Babu Baga Busy, a remake of the Hindi film Hunterrr.

His web series SIN was released on Aha, a streaming service founded by Allu Aravind. The series was produced by Sharrath Marar Northstar Production.

== Filmography ==
Year	Title	Director	Producer	Writer	Visual effects	Ref.
2014	Nice 2 Meet U	Yes	Yes	Yes	No	
2016	London Life	Yes	No	Yes	Yes	
2017	Babu Baga Busy	Yes	No	Screenplay	No	
2020	SIN	Yes	No	Yes	No	
2024	90's – A Middle Class Biopic	No	Yes	No	No	
2024	Rideby	No	No	Screenplay	No	
2025	Hometown	No	Yes	No	No	
