= Maganti =

Maganti (Telugu: మాగంటి) is a Telugu surname. Notable people with the surname include:

- Maganti Ankineedu (1915–2008), Indian independence activist and politician
- Maganti Gopinath (1963–2025), Indian politician from Telangana state
- Maganti Ramji (1984–2021), Indian film producer
- Maganti Venkateswara Rao (born 1960), Indian politician from Andhra Pradesh

== See also ==
- Banerjee (actor), born Maganti Venu Banerjee, Indian film actor
- Murali Mohan, born Maganti Raja Ram Mohan Roy (born 1940), Indian actor, producer, politician, and business executive
