= Tejaswi =

Tejaswi is an Indian name that may refer to

Given name

- Tejaswi Madivada (born 1991), Indian film actress and model
- Tejaswi Prakash Wayangankar, Indian television actress

Surname

- Poornachandra Tejaswi (1938–2007), Kannada writer, novelist, photographer, ornithologist, publisher, painter and environmentalist
