= C.D: Criminal or Devil =

2024 Indian psychological thriller film

- Theatrical release poster
- Directed by: Krishna Annam
- Written by: Muddu Krishna
- Produced by: Giridhar
- Starring: Adah Sharma; Viswant Duddumpudi; Mahesh Vitta
- Cinematography: Satish Muthyala
- Edited by: Satya Giduturi
- Music by: RR Dhruvan
- Production company: SSCN Productions
- Release date: 24 May 2024
- Running time: 123 minutes
- Country: India
- Language: Telugu

C.D: Criminal or Devil is a 2024 Indian Telugu-language psychological thriller film directed by Krishna Annam and produced by Giridhar. It stars Adah Sharma, Viswant Duddumpudi, Mahesh Vitta, and Bharani Shankar as lead actors.

== Cast ==
- Adah Sharma as Raksha
- Viswant Duddumpudi as Siddhu
- Mahesh Vitta
- Bharani Shankar

== Plot ==
Siddu (Viswant Duddumpudi) is left alone at his home when his grandparents live away in the village. A maid (Jabardast Rohini) occasionally comes to the house. Siddu harbors a strong fear of ghosts.

One night, after watching a horror film called "Devil," he becomes convinced that a ghost from the movie is out to get him. Meanwhile, Raksha (Adah Sharma), a disturbed individual, is on a spree of kidnapping girls, creating chaos in the community.

As the police work diligently to apprehend her, she continues her abductions. Eventually, Raksha targets Siddu, taking him hostage at home. The narrative unfolds to reveal the connections between Siddu's fears, Raksha's intentions, the true identity of the girls' kidnapper, and the police's efforts to resolve the situation

== Release ==
C.D was theatrically released on 24 May 2024.

== Reception ==
Bhavana Sharma of Deccan Chronicle reviewed the movie positively calling it a combination of genres, featuring powerful performances from the lead actors. She called the storyline captivating with twists which are appealing.
