= Shadow Assassins =

2022 Hindi movie

- Directed by: Nilaanjan Reeta Datta
- Written by: Nilaanjan Reeta Datta; Raaghav Dar; Bhushan Ingole
- Based on: Secret killings of Assam
- Produced by: Munna Bhagat; Nilaanjan Reeta Datta; Navnita Sen; Siddharth Mahajan; Rahul Kapoor; Shitiz Jain; Anil Goswami; Rassmin Bora
- Starring: Anurag Sinha; Mishti Chakraborty; Saharsh Kumar Shukla; Hemant Kher; Rakesh Chaturvedi
- Cinematography: Gargey Trivedi
- Edited by: Navnita Sen
- Music by: Ashu Chakraborty
- Production companies: Finchbill Motion Pictures; Rocking Rickshaw; Contento Media
- Distributed by: Finchbill Motion Pictures
- Release date: 9 December 2022
- Running time: 126 minutes
- Country: India
- Language: Hindi
- Box office: ₹1.5 crore

Shadow Assassins (2022) is a 2022 Indian action thriller film directed by Nilaanjan Reeta Datta and written by Nilaanjan Reeta Datta, Raaghav Dar and Bhushan Ingole. The film is based on 1990s Secret killings of Assam.

== Plot ==
The story of the film narrates about Nirbhay Kalita. Kalita leaves his home in Guwahati, Assam, with dreams of starting a new chapter in life on a college campus in Pune, Maharashtra. But his life gets stuck in the world of vengeance when his near and dear ones are assassinated.

== Cast ==
- Anurag Sinha as Nirbhay kalita
- Mishti Chakraborty as Rimli Bora
- Hemant Kher as Dr.Dhiren Kalita
- Rakesh Chaturvedi Om as Police Inspector
- Ranjeev lal Baruah as Bhavik
- Monuj Borkotoky as Debojit
- Ranjita Boruah as Puravi Kalita
- Stuti Choudhury as Ratna Kalita
- Bibhuti Bhushan Hazarika as News Editor
- Rohit Kp as Chinmoy
- Soumya Mukherjee as Rishab Banerjee
- KP Sandhu as Neeraj Deka
- Saharsh Kumar Shukla as Kamal Sharma
- Akash Sinha as Mukul
- Violet Nazir Tiwari as Mother

== Release ==
The film was released in theatres on 9 December 2022. The film released in Singapore on 9 February.

== Reception ==
Komal Nahta for "Film Information" wrote "Shadow Assassins is for a thin section of the audience in Assam only, because the story is about happenings in that state. For the rest of the world, there’s precious little in the film. Flop." Pravasi Express wrote "Singaporean actor, KP Sandhu stars in a pivotal role as Neeraj Deka, a ruthless anti-ULFA radical who goes to extreme lengths to hinder the movement. The film’s moving soundtrack by Javed Ali and Ashu Chakraborty has also received international acclaim." Ambar Chatterjee for EastMojo wrote "I watched Shadow Assassins in a practically empty theatre. This brings me to the point that I have raised numerous times before. We have to support our regional cinema and our own stories. If a film like this fails at the box office, it will deter many others from making films on similar subjects or on Assam as a whole."

Anurag Sinha wins Best Actor Award for his portrayal of ‘Nirbhay Kalita’ at New Jersey Indian & International Film Festival and Alternative Film Festival, Toronto in 2023.
