= Boyfriend for Hire =

2022 Indian romantic comedy film

- Theatrical release poster
- Directed by: Santosh Kambhampati
- Written by: Santosh Kambhampati
- Produced by: K. Niranjan Reddy; Venu Madhav Peddi
- Starring: Viswant Duddumpudi; Malavika Satheesan
- Cinematography: Bala Saraswathi
- Edited by: Vijay Vardhan K.
- Music by: Gopi Sundar
- Production companies: Prime Show Entertainment; Swastika Cinema
- Release date: 14 October 2022
- Country: India
- Language: Telugu

Boyfriend for Hire is a 2022 Indian Telugu-language romantic comedy film written and directed by Santosh Kambhampati. The film stars Viswant Duddumpudi and Malavika Satheesan.

== Cast ==
- Viswant Duddumpudi as Arjun
- Malavika Satheesan as Divya
- Pooja Ramachandran as Natasha
- Madhunandan as Balu, Arjun’s friend
- Harsha Vardhan as Arjun’s uncle
- Raja Ravindra as Divya’s father
- Sudharshan as Divya’s prospective groom
- Sivannarayana Naripeddi as Arjun’s father
- Rupa Lakshmi as Arjun’s mother
- Gayatri Bhargavi as Arjun’s aunt
- Siri Raasi as Siri
- Gururaj Manepalli as Arjun’s former boss
- Ashu Reddy as Herself (Special Appearance)
- Ariyana Glory as Herself (Special Appearance)
- Lahari Shari as Herself (Special Appearance)

== Production ==
On 17 March 2020, it was reported that the filming was temporarily halted in Hyderabad due to the COVID-19 pandemic and was expected to be resumed the following month. On 2 May 2021, it was announced that the filming was completed and the film was under post-production. The film was produced by K. Niranjan Reddy and Venu Madhav Peddi through Swastika Cinema, in association with Prime Show Entertainment.

== Soundtrack ==
Boyfriend for Hire

Soundtrack album by Gopi Sundar
- Released: 2022
- Genre: Feature film soundtrack
- Length: 15:03
- Language: Telugu
- Label: Sony Music India

Gopi Sundar chronology
Bhoothakaalam (2022)	Boyfriend for Hire (2022)	18 Pages (2022)

The film has songs composed by Gopi Sundar.

Track listing
No.	Title	Lyrics	Singer(s)	Length
1.	"Neevevvaro"	Rehman	Chinmayi Sripada	4:32
2.	"Neethone Vasthunna"	Rakendu Mouli	Sravana Bhargavi	3:21
3.	"Vachesadu Hire Ke Boyfriendu"	Rakendu Mouli	L. V. Revanth	3:34
4.	"Nuvve Jatha Nuvve"	Rehman	Rahul Nambiar	3:36
Total length:				15:03

== Release ==
Boyfriend for Hire was released theatrically on 14 October 2022.

== Reception ==
Paul Nicodemus of The Times of India rated the film two-and-a-half out of five stars and wrote, "It's a film that appeals more to one's senses than the grey matter. The vibrant aesthetic, competent performances, experimental story and melodious songs make it a viable romantic comedy." Satya Pulagam of ABP Desam gave the film two out of five stars and stated that while the title was novel, the screenplay was routine. Srivathsan Nadadhur of OTTplay gave it one-and-a-half out of five stars and wrote, "Boyfriend for Hire, promoted as a new-age rom-com, bites the dust. The film struggles to rise above its implausible premise and doesn’t have an iota of conviction in the many ideas it’s trying to suggest. Viswant and Malavika Satheesan’s performances and Gopi Sundar’s music are the only silver linings."
