= Adam Joan =

- Theatrical release poster
- Directed by: Jinu V. Abraham
- Written by: Jinu V. Abraham
- Produced by: Josemon Simon
- Starring: Prithviraj Sukumaran; Mishti Chakravarty
- Cinematography: Jithu Damodar
- Edited by: Manoj
- Music by: Songs: Deepak Dev; Score: Gopi Sundar
- Production companies: Jairaj Motion Pictures; B Cinemas
- Distributed by: Renji Panicker Entertainment
- Release date: 1 September 2017
- Running time: 163 minutes
- Country: India
- Language: Malayalam
- Box office: ₹17.5 crore (Kerala alone)

Adam Joan is a 2017 Indian Malayalam-language romantic thriller film written and directed by Jinu V. Abraham (in his directorial debut). produced by Jairaj Motion Pictures and B Cinemas, and distributed by Renji Panicker Entertainment. It stars Prithviraj Sukumaran in the title role alongside Mishti Chakravarty, Narain, Rahul Madhav, Bhavana, Lena, Maniyanpilla Raju, Jaya Menon, and Madhusudhan Rao. It was shot in Scotland and Kerala. Adam Joan was released on 1 September 2017 and was a major commercial success.

== Plot ==
Adam Joan Pothen is a rich businessman in Kerala with a passion for farming. One day, he meets a Jewish girl named Amy who sings in a choir. They eventually fall in love and get married. Adam's brother, Unni (Alan), Unni's wife Swetha, and their mother Nirmala are settled in Scotland. Adam and Amy visit them, where Amy conceives and is forced to stay there. While Adam returns to Kerala on plantation business, Amy dies of childbirth complications. Adam is overwhelmed and leaves his newborn daughter Ila with his brother and sister-in-law, who are childless. Adam believes that the pregnancy was the cause of his wife's death and never visits his daughter thereafter.

Seven years later, a guilt-ridden Adam returns to Scotland when his mother is killed and Ila is kidnapped by unknown people. Adam starts an investigation along with his childhood friend Cyriac. After receiving information about children being kidnapped from Edinburgh, the duo learns of Satan worshippers who sacrifice young Jewish girls or Christian missionaries to Satan on days such as Good Friday and Easter, when Satan is considered to be weak. They suspect the Satan worshippers of kidnapping Ila as she is half-Jewish from her maternal side. Cyriac notes that Swetha's friend Daisy was suspiciously messaging someone the day Ila was kidnapped, and she hails from a family in Kerala which secretly worships dark forces called Karuthachan Ootu. They deduce that this might have something to do with Ila's kidnapping.

Adam and Cyriac kidnap and interrogate Daisy. She reveals being part of a satanic cult spread across the Scottish mainland. She also reveals having taken Swetha to their church where the latter prayed to have her own child and was declared pregnant after five months. The cult's high priest, Edward Williams, who is Daisy and Swetha's professor at work, had demanded that Swetha either dedicate her awaited baby to Satan or surrender Ila for a Satanic ritual, both of which Swetha did not agree to. However, the cult's real target was Ila, and her identity was given to Edward by Daisy who told them where to find Ila. Swetha knew about the kidnappers but believed that Ila will be returned after the ritual and deeply apologizes to Adam. Adam and Cyriac search Edward's house for more clues, finding a photograph with 12 Satanic priests. Adam then abducts Edward and tortures him to no avail, so he takes Edward back to his house. Adam gets rid of all of the evidence of his presence and kills Edward by throwing him off the stairs after force-feeding him with alcohol.

Still on tracking Ila, Adam goes to Edward's grave after his funeral, where he finds the other priests performing rituals on the grave. He learns of Nathan, a Sri Lankan Tamilian Satanic priest. He was one of the 12 priests in the photo whom Adam had actually seen once with Ila but fails to catch him. He follows Nathan, kidnaps his daughter, and asks him to disclose Ila's location. Nathan reveals that Ila is going to be sacrificed within two days, in a ceremony on Good Friday, which will be attended by all the satanic priests, including himself. Adam, who had earlier arranged Cyriac to safely return Nathan's daughter, is taken to the ceremonial venue by Nathan, who reminds him that the new high priest, Dr. Steve, is a ruthless and brilliant man who will sense any form of danger. Adam is introduced to Steve as George Augustine, a satanic priest from India. As prayers for Ila's sacrifice starts, Steve blows Adam's cover but is disrupted by Nathan who does not know that his daughter is safe, telling Steve that the daughter's life is in Adam's hands. Steve tries to contact her, but Cyriac warns Steve on the phone that Adam and Ila should return unharmed or else he will kill Nathan's daughter.

Adam falls unconscious after being knocked out, and an enraged Nathan charges towards Steve, not willing to wait anymore for the ritual to begin, but is almost killed by the other priests. Waking up to save his daughter, Adam kills all of the priests but is stabbed by Steve. However, Adam overpowers and kills him. Nathan dies, while Adam rescues Ila and leaves but dies due to his own injuries en route. Adam is buried next to the graves of Amy and his mother. Cyriac asks Ila about Adam, to which she responds that he was her father's brother. Unni and Shweta decide to tell Ila the real facts when she is old enough and will come with better flowers when she learns the truth about her parents.

== Cast ==
- Prithviraj Sukumaran as Adam John ("Joan") Pothen
- Mishti Chakravarty as Amy Adam Pothen
- Narain as Cyriac
- Rahul Madhav as Alan John ("Unni") Pothen
- Bhavana as Swetha Alan Pothen
- Lena as Daisy
- Madhusudhan Rao as Nathan
- Jaya Menon as Nirmala Pothen
- Maniyanpilla Raju as Andrews, Amy's father
- K. P. A. C. Lalitha as Cyriac's mother
- Mark Strange as Dr. Steve
- Christopher John Bridgett as Edward Williams
- Grant Manson McGregor as John Balssa (Satanic Priest)
- Benny Bereal as Michael Sallambier (Satanic Priest)
- Gerard Wilkie as Satanist
- Sidhartha Siva as Ajai
- Shine M. Tom as Philip
- Megha Mathew as Niya
- Lintu Rony as Church attender
- Juliet Watt as Julia
- Pamela Hanson as Police Constable
- Rufus Allan as Professor
- Begonia Villalba as Police Detective
- Danny Darren as David William

== Production ==
Adam Joan marks the directorial debut of Jinu V. Abraham. Prithviraj Sukumaran played the lead character of Adam John Pothen, a rich planter. Mishti Chakravarty made her debut in the Malayalam film industry through this film, while Narain played the role of Adam's friend, Cyriac. The film has two female protagonists, including Bhavana. Predominantly filmed in Scotland, the movie also has portions shot at Kochi, Kottayam, Mundakkayam, and Thumpamon.

The movie is produced by BCinemas & Jairaj Motion Pictures (Josemon, Brijesh Mohammad & Umesh Unnikrishnan Nair)

The movie is distributed by Renji Panicker Entertainment.

== Music ==
Gopi Sundar composed the film score. The songs were composed by Deepak Dev with lyrics penned by Santhosh Varma, B. K. Harinarayanan, Gilu Joseph, and Sri. C. P. Chandy.

Track listing

- "Arikil Ini Njaan Varaam" - Prithviraj Sukumaran
- "Eden Thottam" - Karthika
- "Ee Kaattu" - Karthik, Chorus

== Release ==
Adam Joan was one of the Onam releases of 2017. It was initially released on 1 September 2017 in the United States and a week later in Kerala and the GCC.

== Reception ==
=== Box office ===
The film grossed ₹1.10 crore on the opening day at the Kerala box office. It collected ₹17.5 crore from Kerala box office.

=== Critical reception ===
Adam Joan received mixed-to-positive reviews.

Arya UR of Times of India rated the film 3 of 5 stars and wrote, "Prithviraj's first dialogue in the movie during a funeral pretty much sets the tone of the film – cold, sombre and dark. ... If you are in the mood for a dark thriller and also want to watch Prithviraj in a stylish avatar, you could give the film a try."

Mythily Ramachandran of Gulf News wrote, "Though beautifully wrapped up in Jithu Damodaran's visuals, Adam Joan is quite a let-down."

Anagha Jayan E of Onmanorama described the film as a "surprisingly original, fast-paced thriller" and wrote, "In essence, Adam Joan is a vintage suspense movie, which marks a powerful return of Bhavana and Narain after a break."

Ashameera Aiyappan of The Indian Express rated the film 1.5/5 stars and wrote, "The film helmed by Jinu Abraham starring Prithviraj, Bhavna and Narein looks beautiful on screen. But the picturesque visuals isn't backed with a story that is as engaging."

Meera Suresh of Cinema Express wrote, "With the right amount of romance, action, thrill and emotions, director Jinu cooks up an appetising meal."
