= Wish You Happy Breakup =

- Directed by: Kiran Rao Paruvella
- Written by: Kiran Rao Paruvella
- Produced by: Kiran Rao Paruvella
- Starring: Udai Kiran; Swetaa Verma; Tejaswi Madivada
- Cinematography: Surya Vinay
- Edited by: Surya Vinay
- Music by: Paragg Chhabra
- Release date: 2016
- Country: India
- Language: Telugu

Wish You Happy Breakup is a 2016 Telugu language film written and directed by Kiran Rao Paruvella. It stars Udai Kiran, Swetaa Verma and Tejaswi Madivada.

== Cast ==
- Udai Kiran...Naresh
- Swetaa Verma...Nitya
- Tejaswi Madivada...Niki
- Ravi Kamanth...Sam
- Krithi Kumar...Pandit
- Devaa Malishetty...Suresh
- Sreyesh Nimmagadda...Johnny
- Maniikanta Sunni...Balu

== Reviews ==
Times of India gave 3 stars out of 5 stating, "It's the kind of film you wouldn't mind watching with a group of friends just for evil pleasure or with a date to liven up a boring evening". The Hindu gave 3 stars stating, "Writing carries the day, Another small budget story that deserves a watch."
