= Ice Cream (2014 film) =

- Theatrical release poster
- Directed by: Ram Gopal Varma
- Written by: Ram Gopal Varma
- Produced by: Tummalapalli Rama Satyanarayana
- Starring: Navdeep; Tejaswi Madivada
- Cinematography: Anji
- Edited by: Pratap Kumar Sanga
- Music by: Pradyothan
- Production company: Bhimavaram Talkies
- Release date: 12 July 2014
- Running time: 104 mins
- Country: India
- Language: Telugu

Ice Cream is a 2014 Telugu-language horror film written and directed by Ram Gopal Varma. It stars Navdeep and Tejaswi Madivada. It is the first Indian movie to be filmed with Flowcam System Technology and was released on 12 July 2014. The film deals with a character that is obsessed with eating ice cream and has a nightmare disorder. Upon release, the film became a blockbuster at the box office.

== Plot ==
Renu (Tejaswi Madivada) is a rich girl, who lives alone in a huge bungalow that she recently moved into instead of going to her cousin's wedding. On the first day itself, Renu starts getting weird dreams about her house being haunted with evil people. A scared Renu calls over her boyfriend Vishal (Navdeep) for help. Vishal and Renu enjoy themselves at the bungalow. Vishal also pretends to scare Renu a few times, but later he too realizes the house is haunted. Rest of the story is as to what happens to both of them, and will they survive this evil haunted house during their stay.

== Cast ==
- Navdeep as Vishal
- Tejaswi Madivada as Renu

== Production ==
Actress Tejaswi Madivada was signed as the movie's lead actress and stated that "Working with RGV was a dream come true because he lets you be yourself, gives you space to act without the camera restrictions".

== Sequel ==
In July 2014, shortly after the release of the film, Ram Gopal Varma announced that he was going to make a sequel entitled Ice Cream 2. Mrudhula Basker was confirmed to be the film's lead actress. J.D. Chakravarthy was signed to play the male lead shortly after. However, the sequel didn't perform as well as the first installment at the box office and was a flop.
