= O Saathiya =

Indian film

- Directed by: Divya Bhavana
- Written by: Deepu; Aryan Gowra
- Produced by: Chandana Katta
- Starring: Aryan Gowra; Mishti Chakraborty
- Cinematography: EJ Venu
- Edited by: Carthic Cuts
- Music by: Vinod Kumar (Vinnu)
- Production company: Thanvika Jashwika Creations
- Release date: 7 July 2023
- Country: India
- Language: Telugu

O Saathiya is a 2023 Indian Telugu-language film directed by Divya Bhavana and written by Aryan Gowra and produced by Chandana Katta under the banner of Thanvika Jashwika Creations. It stars Aryan Gowra and Mishti Chakraborty.

== Plot ==
Arjun arrived home, drenched, and extracted a wedding card from its covering. Shifting to a few hours earlier, Arjun toiled in his office before receiving a call from his friend Sauresh, urging him to come to the temple for help with a situation involving Sauresh's girlfriend. At the temple, Arjun encountered Keerthi, who was handed her wedding card by her mother.

Jumping back a few years in Vishakhapatnam, Arjun engaged in a skirmish with Balraju, landing them in the principal's office due to the havoc they wreaked. Here, Arjun's eyes met Keerthi's for the first time, leading to an instantaneous infatuation. Subsequently, Balraju warned Arjun to back off from Keerthi, but Arjun took a proactive step by altering a classroom inscription that professed his affection for Keerthi, believing it to be Balraju's scheme.

Keerthi thwarted Balraju's affections after Arjun orchestrated a ruse where she pretended to be his girlfriend. On that very day, Arjun confessed his love for Keerthi.

The subsequent day, Keerthi mysteriously stopped attending college and ceased answering calls. Confused and despondent, Arjun's college attendance and mental well-being plummeted. His father, attempting to console him, advised him to embark on a trip. Meanwhile, Sauresh relocated to Hyderabad due to his father's transfer.

Four months later, Arjun abandoned college, dedicating himself to managing his father's car repair shop. It was there that he stumbled upon Keerthi's image on a college pamphlet. In collaboration with Sauresh, he ascertained her whereabouts in Hyderabad and learned she was studying there. Intent on reuniting with her, Arjun pursued his college education by surmounting his academic setbacks.

Arjun's journey to Hyderabad in pursuit of Keerthi unveiled an unexpected truth: Keerthi was already in a relationship with Rahul. Keerthi recounted how Rahul had offered her a Frooti drink when some miscreants snatched hers. She subsequently asked Arjun for money, which he raised by selling his chain, only to discover she intended to gift it to Rahul. She soon returned the money.

After a breakup with Rahul, Arjun prepared food for Keerthi, offering solace during her difficult time. However, he witnessed Rahul's presence at Keerthi's house and departed, overcome with emotion.

Following his B.Tech., Arjun faced years of job rejections due to his career gap. During a pub outing with friends, Keerthi, who had been out of contact, called Arjun for a meeting. During their encounter, Keerthi confessed her desire to drink and her recent breakup. Inebriated, she drove in drunken state and vomited in front of a traffic police officer. Arjun brought her to his apartment.

Arjun expressed his love for Keerthi once more, and in return, she gifted him her late father's ring. While Arjun is in a job interview, he received a call informing him of Keerthi's accident. He left a job interview prematurely to visit Keerthi at the hospital, finding her with minor injuries. His subsequent attempt to reschedule the interview was declined. Keerthi's mother learned of Keerthi's love affair and indicated that Keerthi would only marry him if he had a job. A disagreement ensued between Arjun and Keerthi regarding his choice to prioritize her over his career.

Overhearing Arjun's conversation with Sauresh, where he expressed regret over reconnecting with Keerthi, Keerthi departed, leaving him in tears.

In a revealing diary entry, Keerthi confessed that she had been the one to fall in love with Arjun at first sight while seeing him offer a Frooti drink to a schoolgirl at a bus stop. She also admitted to writing the "I Love You Keerthi - Arjun" note on the classroom board.

In a flashback, Keerthi's initial fondness for Arjun turned into a poignant tale of her father's death by suicide, her family's struggles, and her uncle's coercive intentions. The money she borrowed from Arjun wasn't for Rahul's gift, but to aid the security guard. Keerthi resolved her family's debts and resisted her uncle's plan to marry her to Rahul.

Arjun, having transformed his attitude, attended Keerthi's wedding with a bouquet containing the ring she had once given him. Upon overhearing their conversation, Keerthi's mother recognized her daughter's true feelings and encouraged her to reunite with Arjun. Consequently, Arjun and Keerthi found their way back to each other's arms.

== Cast ==
- Aryan Gowra as Arjun
- Mishti Chakraborty as Keerthi
- Devi Prasad as Arjun's father
- Kalpa Latha as Arjun's mother
- Dwaraka as Rahul
- Annapurna as grandmother
- Sivannarayana Naripeddi as principal
- C. V. L. Narasimha Rao as Keerthi's uncle
- Pramodini as Keerthi's mother
- Appaji Ambarisha Darbha as HR Manager
- Chaitanya Garikipati as Suresh
- Krazy Khanna as Suresh's roommate
- Bullet Bhaskar as Inspector
- Yadam Raju as Constable
- Busstop Koteshwara Rao as Suresh's father
- Jabardasth Sunny as peon

== Soundtrack ==
O Saathiya

Soundtrack album by Vinod Kumar (Vinnu)
- Released: 20 January 2023
- Recorded: 2022–2023
- Studio: Thanvika Jashwika Creations
- Language: Telugu
- Label: Times Music
- Producer: Vinod Kumar (Vinnu)

All music is composed by Vinod Kumar (Vinnu).

Tracklist
No.	Title	Lyrics	Singer(s)	Length
1.	"O Saathiya"	Bhaskarabhatla	Javed Ali	5:14
2.	"Nelamedha Lene"	Ananta Sriram	Yazin Nizar	4:25
3.	"Breakup Anthem - Vellipoye"	Bhaskarabhatla	Rahul Sipligunj	4:23

== Reception ==
A critic from The Times of India wrote that "O Saathiya manages to impress with its heartfelt storytelling. While it may not reinvent the wheel, this film will leave you with a warm, fuzzy feeling, reminding you of the eternal allure of love". A critic from The Hans India wrote that "On a whole, "O Saathiya" is a beautiful depiction of the first love experience and thus strikes a chord with all sections of the audience".
