= Harshavardhan Kulkarni =

Indian screenwriter and filmmaker

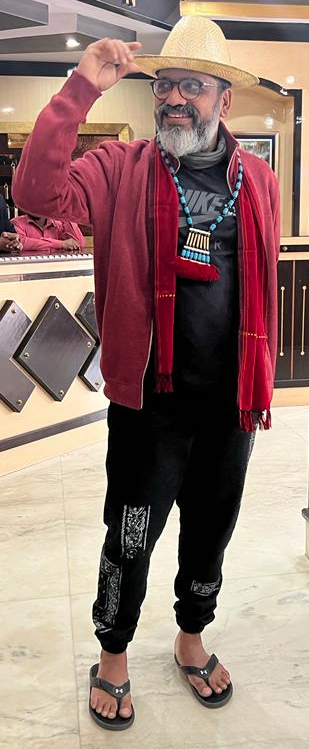
- Harshavardhan in 2022
- Born: Mumbai, Maharashtra, India
- Occupations: Screenwriter; filmmaker
- Years active: 2006–present

Harshavardhan Kulkarni is an Indian film director, screenwriter and producer.

== Early life ==
He is the son of Kannada poet G.V. Kulkarni. He is an alumnus of Don Bosco High School, Borivali, MIT, Pune & Film and Television Institute of India, Savitribai Phule Pune University.

== Career ==
His directorial debut feature film Hunterrr was released in 2015. Hunterrr is Harsh's debut as a director, produced by Phantom Studios and Shemaroo Entertainment got attached to the film for marketing and distribution. His second film was Badhaai Do, starring Bhumi Pednekar and Rajkummar Rao which was released in theatres on 11 February 2022.

== Filmography ==
Key
†	Denotes films that have not yet been released

Year	Title	Director	Writer	Producer	Notes
2006	The Chosen One	No	Yes	Yes	
2007	Apna Asmaan	Associate	No	No	
2008	Lost & Found	Yes	Yes	Yes	Short film
2014	Hasee Toh Phasee	No	Yes	No	
2015	Hunterrr	Yes	Yes	No	
2017	Babu Baga Busy	No	Yes	No	Original story
2022	Badhaai Do	Yes	Yes	No	
2022	Amriki Pandit †	No	Yes	No	Completed
