= Namo (film) =

2024 Indian Telugu-language film by Aditya Reddy Kunduru

- Theatrical release poster
- Directed by: Aditya Reddy Kunduru
- Written by: Aditya Reddy Kunduru
- Produced by: A. Prashant
- Starring: Viswant Duddumpudi; Vismaya Sri; Anuroop Katari
- Cinematography: Rahul Shrivatsav
- Edited by: Sanal Anirudhan
- Music by: Kranthi Acharya Vadluri
- Production companies: Sri Nethra Creations; Aarms Film Factory
- Release date: 7 June 2024
- Country: India
- Language: Telugu

Namo is a 2024 Indian Telugu-language adventure comedy film written and directed by Aditya Reddy Kunduru. The film features Viswant Duddumpudi, Vismaya Sri and Anuroop Katari in lead roles.

The film was released on 7 June 2024.

== Cast ==
- Viswant Duddumpudi as Nagesh
- Vismaya Sri as Ganga
- Anuroop Katari as Mohan
- Virendra Chauhan
- Mayanand Thakur
- Meka Rama Krishna
- Vadlamani Srinivas
- Srinivas Bogireddy
- Pawan

== Music ==
The film's music is composed by Kranthi Acharya Vadluri.

All music is composed by Kranthi Acharya Vadluri.

No.	Title	Lyrics	Singer(s)	Length
1.	"Nallamalla Adavilo"	Rahman	Aditya Tadepalli	5:12

== Release and reception ==
Namo was released on 7 June 2024.

Sakshi Post gave a rating of 2.5 out of 5 stating, "While it is not perfect, Namo has many merits going for it". Suhas Sistu of The Hans India praised the performance of leas actors and the work of the director Aditya Reddy Kunduru.
