= Hide N Seek (2024 film) =

2024 Indian film by Basireddy Rana

- Theatrical release poster
- Directed by: Basireddy Rana
- Written by: Basireddy Rana
- Produced by: Narendra Buchireddygari
- Starring: Viswant Duddumpudi; Rhea Sachdeva; Shilpa Manjunath
- Cinematography: Chinna Ram
- Edited by: Amar Reddy Kudumula
- Music by: Lijo K Jose
- Production company: Sahasra Entertainments
- Release date: 20 September 2024
- Running time: 136 minutes
- Country: India
- Language: Telugu

Hide N Seek is a 2024 Indian Telugu-language crime thriller film, written and directed by Basireddy Rana. It is produced by Narendra Buchireddygari. The film starring Viswant Duddumpudi, Rhea Sachdeva, Shilpa Manjunath, Kashvi, Tejaswi Madivada, Dayanand Reddy and Sumanth are in lead roles.

The music of the film is composed by Lijo K Jose while Chinna Ram is the cinematographer.

== Plot ==
This film, set in Kurnool, Andhra Pradesh, follows Shiva (Vishwanth) as he studies medicine with the aspiration of becoming an army doctor. Engaging in academic study. Resides with his uncle. His father and brother-in-law, both employed in the military, will perish. Consequently, Shiva's Akka (sister) strongly disapproves of his enlisting in the army. Shiv develops romantic feelings for Varsha (Rhea Sachdev), his college classmate. Varsha's father, KK, consents to their marriage. He founded KK Mental Health Hospital and provided treatment to the sufferers. In the metropolis, a delivery boy bludgeons an individual to death with a rod without provocation. It is not an accident; it is a case, and it is resolved. It is neither an accident nor a homicide. A letter will be dispatched to the police station. On one instance, Shiva became embroiled in a homicide investigation.

== Cast ==
- Viswant Duddumpudi as Shiva
- Rhea Sachdeva
- Shilpa Manjunath as SI Vaishnavi
- Kashvi
- Tejaswi Madivada
- Dayanand Reddy
- Rohit Bharadwaj Addanki
- Sumanth
- Akella Raghavendra
- Ravi Raj
- Sridhar Reddy
- Saakshi Siva

== Soundtrack ==
The music and background score is composed by Lijo K Jose. The singers are Haricharan, Radhika Bhide and Lijo K Jose.

All lyrics are written by Suddala Ashok Teja.

Track listing
No.	Title	Singer(s)	Length
1.	"Life of Shiva"	Haricharan, Radhika Bhide	3:46
2.	"Pain of Shiva"	Lijo K. Jose	4:43
Total length:			8:29

== Reception ==
Aditya Devulapally of Cinema Express rated the film two out of five stars and wrote that "The crime thriller directed by Basireddy Rana has a smart serial killer concept but falls flat with weak craft". A critic from Deccan Chronicle wrote that "The screenplay keeps viewers on the edge of their seats, skillfully weaving suspense with emotional depth. Though the pacing falters slightly in the second half, the return to a frenetic rhythm in the climax compensates for any lulls in momentum."
