= Katha Venuka Katha =

- Theatrical release poster
- Directed by: Krishna Chaithanya
- Written by: Krishna Chaithanya
- Produced by: Dandamudi Avanindra Kumar
- Starring: Viswant Duddumpudi; Srijitha Ghoush; Subha Sri
- Edited by: Amar Reddy Kudumula
- Music by: Shravan Bharadwaj
- Production company: Dandamudi Box Office
- Release date: 12 May 2023
- Country: India
- Language: Telugu

Katha Venuka Katha is a 2023 Indian Telugu-language crime thriller film written and directed by Krishna Chaithanya and starring Viswant Duddumpudi, Srijitha Ghosh and Subha Sri.

The film was released theatrically on 12 May 2023 to mixed reception.

== Cast ==
- Viswant Duddumpudi as Ashwin
- Srijitha Ghoush
- Subha Sri
- Ali
- Sunil
- Jayaprakash
- Banerjee
- Raghu Babu
- Satyam Rajesh
- Madhunandan
- Bupal
- Khayyum
- Ee Rojullo Sai
- Rupa

== Soundtrack ==
- "Muchharaithadi"

== Release ==
Initially, Katha Venuka Katha was scheduled to be released on 24 March 2023, however the release was postponed and it was released theatrically on 12 May 2023. The post-theatrical digital streaming rights of the film were acquired by ETV Win and the film had its digital premiere on 28 March 2024.

== Reception ==
A critic from Sakshi wrote that Chaithanya is somewhat successful in making the film interesting and that the way he revealed each twist in the second half and thrilled the audience is good. A critic from TV9 Telugu called the film a decent crime thriller.
