= Maganti Ramji =

Indian film producer (1984–2021)

- M. K. S. R. C. Chowdary
- Born: 15 February 1984
- Died: 7 March 2021 (aged 37); Vijayawada, Andhra Pradesh, India
- Occupations: Politician, Producer

Maganti Ramji (15 February 1984 – 7 March 2021), also known as Maganti Ram Chandran or M. K. S. R. C. Chowdary was the youngest producer of the Telugu Film Industry. His production house is called Padmini Arts.

== Personal life ==
Maganti Ramji was born on 15 February 1984 in Eluru, West Godavari District to Maganti Venkateswara Rao (Maganti Babu) and Padmavalli Devi. Elder son of Maganti Babu, a noted politician (Ex-Minister, MP, Ex-MLA), and noted Telugu film producer (For Telugu Films, such as Big Boss, Manoharam, Pellaina Kotthalo, Thali, Pranam, Alludu Garu Vacharu, and other films).

Grandson of the late Maganti Ravindranath Chowdary, a noted politician (Ex-Minister, Ex-MLA, Ex-Zilla Parishad Chairman (Received Best Zilla Parishad Chairman Award from late Prime Minister Rajiv Gandhi)), and a noted Telugu Film Producer (for Telugu Films such as GangLeader, Khaidi No 786, Magadheerudu, Maga Maharaju, Maha Nagaramlo Mayagadu, Patnam Vachina Pativrathalu, Vijaya, Bottu Kaatuka, Bommarillu (Old), and other films) and the late Maganti Varalakshmi Devi, a noted politician (Ex-Minister, Ex-MLA).

He completed his B.Tech in Information Technology and an MBA in Finance and Marketing, and entered into film production by establishing his production house in 2011, and produced his first movie 'Tuneegaa Tuneegaa' with a budget of 15 Crores.

Maganti Ramji died on 7 March 2021 while undergoing treatment in a hospital.

=== As producer ===
Year	Title	Cast	Director
2012	Tuneega Tuneega	Sumanth Ashwin, Rhea Chakraborty	M. S. Raju

== Tuneegaa Tuneegaa ==
Started in January 2011 and released on 20 July 2012, this movie was the launch of three people - lead actor Sumanth Ashwin, son of producer M. S. Raju and lead actress Rhea Chakraborthy, MTV's youngest VJ and music director Karthik Raja, son Of Ilaiyaraaja.

Rama Swamy and Ravindra Babu are childhood friends who stay together. Their kids Karthik and Nidhi are of the same age but they hate each other and torment each other by playing pranks. After a certain while, Nidhi is sent abroad for her further studies.

Twelve years later, Nidhi returns and meets Karthik at a family function. It’s love at first sight for Karthik, but he hides his identity. Slowly Nidhi discovers the truth, and in the process, falls for Karthik's charms. Just when everything seems rosy, Nidhi's family wants her to marry someone else. The rest of the story is about how Karthik solves all the issues and wins his love.

It had an average run at box office.
