= Columbus (2015 film) =

- Directed by: R. Samala
- Written by: M. S. Raju; R. Samala
- Produced by: Ashwani Kumar Sehdev
- Starring: Sumanth Ashwin; Mishti Chakraborty; Seerat Kapoor; Saptagiri
- Cinematography: Samala Bhasker
- Edited by: K. V. Krishna Reddy
- Music by: Jithin Roshan
- Release date: 22 October 2015 (India)
- Country: India
- Language: Telugu

Columbus is a 2015 Indian Telugu romantic comedy film starring Sumanth Ashwin, Seerat Kapoor, and Mishti Chakraborty. The film was produced by Ashwani Kumar Sahdev, with the music composed by Jithin Roshan. It was released on 22 October 2015 and dubbed into Hindi as Solo Operation by Wam India PVT. LTD.

== Plot ==
Ashwin (Sumanth Ashwin) is a college student who falls for Indu (Mishti Chakraborty). His love for her becomes so distracting that he ignores his former career goals to concentrate on her. His zeal begins to annoy her. She irritably ignores him and goes to Delhi. Heartbroken, he follows her and becomes involved in a murder mystery and is unfortunately arrested. When released from jail he finds that she has left for good. He crosses paths with Neeraja (Seerat Kapoor) who promises to help him track her down. Neeraja and Ashwin start getting close to each other.

== Cast ==
- Sumanth Ashwin as Ashwin
- Mishti Chakraborty as Indu
- Seerat Kapoor as Neeraja
- Saptagiri as TV Serial Director
- Rohini as Ashwin's mother
- Babloo Prithviraj as Ashwin's father
- Roshan Basheer as Vamshi
- Nagineedu as Neeraja's father
- Kireeti Damaraju as Kireeti, Neeraja’s prospective groom
- Banerjee as SI Surendra
- Sivannarayana Naripeddi as Ashwin father’s friend
- Ananth Babu as Watchman
- Naveen Neni
- Josh Ravi

== Production ==
The film had its audio launch at Hyderabad on 17 October 2015, with hero Daggubati Venkatesh, Sumanth Ashwin, Seerat Kapoor, and Mishti Chakraborty in attendance.
