= O Pitta Katha =

- Theatrical release poster
- Directed by: Chendu Muddu
- Written by: Chendu Muddu
- Produced by: V. Ananda Prasad
- Starring: Viswant; Sanjay Rao; Nithya Shetty
- Cinematography: Sunil Kumar Nama
- Edited by: D. Venkata Prabhu
- Music by: Pravin Lakkaraju
- Production company: Bhavya Creations
- Release date: 6 March 2020
- Country: India
- Language: Telugu

O Pitta Katha (transl. Oh, it's a parable) is a 2020 Indian Telugu-language thriller drama film starring Viswant, Sanjay Rao, and Nithya Shetty in the lead roles with Brahmaji in a supporting role.

Despite receiving pre-release hype, the film was released on 6 March 2020 to mixed reviews.

== Plot ==
The film opens to Venkata "Venky" Lakshmi being kidnapped by a hooded figure while taking a photo on a scenic vacation in the Araku Valley. Her enraged brother-in-law, Krish, who has come to the Kakinada police station alongside Veeraraju, Venky's father. He asks to see the SI immediately to know the whereabouts of Venky, with whom he was in love with. The SI, Ajay Kumar, enquires Veeraraju on his daughter's whereabouts. He assures the SI that his daughter did not elope with any boyfriend as he knows her character.

The film cuts to show Venky and her bond with her father and how her life revolved around college, dance and him. Krish, an NRI from China, came to Kakinada meet his maternal uncle Veeraraju, who also happens to be Venky's father. As Krish stays in Veeraraju's house, he starts to fall in one-sided love with Venky. Krish discloses his love to Veeraraju, who tells him that Krish's mother, is not on talking terms with him and that she will oppose the marriage.

At the Kakinada police station, Krish tells Ajay Kumar that he had a doubt on Prabhu, who works in Veeraraju's theater. Prabhu came to Veeraraju and Venky's house while Krish was staying there to give the theater collection to Veeraraju. Krish tells Ajay Kumar that he has seen Prabhu misbehave with Venky on several incidents including at a Holi celebration. He also tells Ajay Kumar that Veeraraju, who trusted Prabhu, gave him the responsibility of being Venky's driver on her vacation. Upon tracking the whereabouts of Prabhu, Ajay Kumar figures out that Prabhu is in Uppala.

Upon meeting Prabhu, Ajay Kumar interrogates him. Prabhu tells him that he just returned from his friend Pandu's place in Hyderabad. Prabhu tells his backstory that he fell for Venky since childhood. Early on, he frequented Veeraraju's theater with Pandu and eventually started to work there. As he starts to get close with Venky, a distressed Venky tells Prabhu to stop interacting with her.

The Kakinada police figure out that a blasted car in Araku Valley belongs to Venky due to its chassis number. They also show Ajay Kumar a video that reveals that the hooded figure was in fact Krish. The police plan on tracking down Krish's whereabouts and tell Prabhu to leave the police station. As Prabhu is leaving, his cries turn into an evil smirk, which hints that he too had a hand in Venky's disappearance.

Krish gets a phone from his mother, who tells him to come back to his home in China immediately since his father had a stroke. En route, he is caught by Ajay Kumar. Upon interrogation of the video, Krish tells Ajay Kumar that the face in the video is not his but morphed since he does not have such a beard as shown in the video. Krish goes to the Rajahmundry Airport to go back to China. Ajay Kumar changes his suspicions back to Prabhu.

The film cuts back to Prabhu's love story with Venky while she was in college. They fell in love simultaneously when Krish was getting close to Venky, but Venky assures Prabhu that Krish's is naturally has an outwardly nature from growing up abroad and that their love is still strong. A flashback shows that Krish tricked Venky into thinking that he is in love with her when in reality he was after the theater that Veeraraju owned, which is worth ₹50 crores, and was planning to kill both Venky and Veeraraju. Krish tells Prabhu his plan to kill Venky by masquerading as her driver and pushing the car with her in it in the Araku Valley, and how is he doesn't he will make sure Venky doesn't stay in a relationship with Prabhu anymore. A hesitant Prabhu initially tells Krish that he will tell both Veeraraju and the police but reluctantly agrees due to his financial compensation.

After Prabhu kills Venky, Krish arranges a plan for Prabhu to escape to Dubai via Mumbai. However, unbeknownst to Prabhu, Krish's friend Masthan will kill Prabhu in Mumbai. Krish tells his friend to masquerade as a tourist in Araku Valley and turn in the phone to the police. One of the police officers who is close to Prabhu since Prabhu's childhood is in dismay after seeing the video of him killing Venky and Prabhu tells the police officer to give him a day's time and he will sort everything out. A flashback shows how Prabhu didn't actually kill Venky and shows how he asked Pandu to arrange a duplicate Ambassador car to push off the valley. Krish, who was overlooking the whole incident from above, didn't realize that Prabhu didn't actually kill Venky since a building was masquerading the point of transition between the two cars.

Prabhu had safeguarded Venky for three days and Venky compared him to Sai Baba, who she reverently follows. Veeraraju calls Ajay Kumar, who has not yet connected all the dots in Venky's case, that Venky has arrived home. Krish, who was thought to have left to China, is in Ooty, working at a roadside stall serving Chinese food, and he is ready to get revenge.

== Cast ==
- Viswant as Krish
- Sanjay Rao as Prabhu
- Nithya Shetty as P. Venkata "Venky" Lakshmi
- Bala Raju as Pandu
- Brahmaji as SI S. Ajay Kumar

== Production ==
"My film is not inspired or adapted from any book or film. If an accident happens, we blame the opposite person and that person blames us. But actually what happens there is something else"

— Chendu Muddu on the film's story, 2020

In 2017, Sanjay Rrao, who worked in the Indian Merchant Navy, decided to take up acting. His father Brahmaji wanted to act in his debut film. Director Sagar Chandra referred him to director Chandu Muddu. Chendu Muddu narrated a story to Brahmaji that was similar to Race (2008) and that there would be three iterations of the story: one each told from two of the lead characters and what actually happened. Chendu Muddu made this story as a two hour film with Sanjay Rao, which was shot in Amalapuram with a 5D camera. Both Merlapaka Gandhi and Hanu Raghavapudi wanted to produce the film fas a feature film. After the failure of their respective films Krishnarjuna Yudham (2018) and Lie (2017), Brahmaji decided not to approach them. Bhavya Creations agreed to produce the film on the basis that Chandra Sekhar Yeleti liked the film. This film marks the mainstream film debut of Chendu Muddu, since his previous two films, Maa Oorilo Okasari Emi Jarigindante (2012) and Ee Cinema Superhit Guarantee (2015), didn't have high-profile releases notably due to not being backed by a known production house. To prepare for his role in the film, Sanjay Rrao lost some weight.

The film was shot in Hyderabad, Kerala, and Kakinada.

Trivikram Srinivas gave the film its tagline: it’s a long story...

== Themes and influences ==
Koratala Siva felt that the film was reminiscent of Vamsy's films due to Chendu Muddu's visual presentation.

== Soundtrack ==
The songs were composed by Pravin Lakkaraju.

O Pitta Katha

Soundtrack album by Pravin Lakkaraju
- Released: 1 March 2020
- Recorded: 2020
- Genre: Feature Film Soundtrack
- Label: Mango Music
- Producer: Anand Prasad

Singles from O Pitta Katha
- 1. "Emai Pothane" Released: 14 February 2020

No.	Title	Singer(s)	Length
1.	"Edho Edho"	Sweekar Agasthi	3:36
2.	"Edho Manasuna"	Lipsika Bhasyam	1:31
3.	"Raakshasudey"	Pravin Lakkaraju	2:29
4.	"Emai Pothane"	Pravin Lakkaraju	3:38
5.	"Eyi Kontey Daana"	Sreenivas Joyusula	0:49
Total length:			12

== Release ==
The film had its theatrical release on 6 March 2020 alongside Palasa 1978, Anukunnadi Okati Ayinadi Okati and College Kumar.

=== Reception ===
On the film's premiere on 5 March 2020, Anil Ravipudi reportedly appreciated the film's screenplay, which contained several twists. Paturi Rajasekhar of The Times of India gave the film a rating of three out of five stars and wrote that "Overall, it’s the interesting and funny twists in the second half that make O Pitta Katha an entertaining watch". A critic from Sakshi gave the film a rating of three star out of five, and has stated that despite the confusing screenplay and direction, everyone can watch this film, without any confusion. On the contrary, Y. Sunita Chowdary of The Hindu stated that "Sadly here, there is no upgrading in terms of dialogues or entertainment despite having the scope. Songs are pleasing but Sunil Kumar Nama's cinematography highlights the limitations of the artistes". BVS Prakash of The Hans India wrote, "Director Chendu would soon realise that just 'twists' cannot hold the interest of the viewers without a refreshing story. Actually, 'Pitta Katha' means parable, a small story that ends with a moral lesson. But in this film, director tries to extend a wafer-thin story beyond a point and falls flat".

=== Box office ===
The film was a box office failure due to the COVID-19 pandemic but was well received by the audience after its OTT release.
