= Porichoi =

- Poster
- Directed by: Rupali Guha
- Written by: Rupali Guha
- Produced by: Soumo Ganguly
- Starring: Prosenjit Chatterjee; Joey Debroy; Mishti; Heidi Mumford; Ferdous Ahmed
- Narrated by: Prosenjit Chatterjee
- Music by: Anupam Roy
- Production company: Johar's Production Company
- Release date: 2013
- Country: India
- Language: Bengali

Porichoi is a 2013 Indian Bengali-language drama film written and directed by Rupali Guha. It is the story of a father-daughter relationship and a handsome young boy who helps them to rediscover it. Played by Prosenjit Chatterjee, Joey Debroy and Indrani Chakraborty, the story highlights Bengali-speaking Asians living in the UK who finds various means to stay connected with their homeland, especially during adversities. It was released on 21 July 2013.

Debroy made his debut in the Bengali film industry as a hero, while Guha is the daughter of film director Basu Chatterjee, and makes her directorial debut in Bengal with this film. The international cast also includes veteran British-Bangladeshi actor Ifte Amed in a dynamic negative role.

== Plot ==
Twelve years later, Fahim helped Anupam and Rimi to reunite, enabling them to rebuild their father-daughter relationship. Anupam had previously left for the UK, leaving Rimi and her mother behind. Rimi then travels to the UK to reconnect with her estranged father. She comes to terms with his lifestyle there. She also befriends Fahim, a British-Bangladeshi boy played by Joey Debroy. The film focuses on the lives of Rimi, Anupam and Fahim. When their worlds begin to fall apart, the characters are forced to look inwards.

== Cast ==
- Prosenjit Chatterjee as Anupam
- Joey Debroy as Fahim
- Mishti as Rimi
- Heidi Mumford as Laurie
- Ferdous Ahmed as Salim
- Ifte Amed as Proshonto Choudhury
- Indrani Chakraborty
- Nipun Akter

== Production ==
The film has been shot in the UK and Kolkata.
