= Tholu Bommalata (film) =

2019 Telugu comedy drama film

- Theatrical release poster
- Directed by: Viswanath Maganti
- Screenplay by: Viswanath Maganti
- Story by: Viswanath Maganti
- Produced by: Maganti Durga Prasad
- Starring: Rajendra Prasad; Vennela Kishore; Viswant Duddumpudi; Harshitha Chowdary
- Cinematography: Satish Mutyala
- Edited by: Kotagiri Venkateswara Rao
- Music by: Suresh Bobbili
- Production company: Suma Durga Creations
- Release date: 22 November 2019
- Running time: 140 mins
- Country: India
- Language: Telugu
- Budget: ₹5.5 crore

Tholu Bommalata (transl. Puppetry) is a 2019 Telugu comedy drama film, produced by Maganti Durga Prasad on Suma Durga Creations banner and directed by Viswanath Maganti. It stars Rajendra Prasad, Vennela Kishore, Viswant Duddumpudi, Harshitha Chowdary in the lead roles and music composed by Suresh Bobbili.

== Cast ==
- Rajendra Prasad as Somaraju / Sodala Raju
- Vennela Kishore as Santosh
- Viswant Duddumpudi as Rushi
- Harshitha Chowdary as Varsha
- Chalapati Rao as Ranga
- Prasad Babu as Somaraju's friend
- Narayana Rao as Chandram
- Thagubothu Ramesh as Aatmaram
- Dhanraj as Kotthem
- Devi Prasad as Murali, Somaraju's son
- Narra Srinivas as Somaraju's son-in-law
- Pooja Ramachandran as Bhavana
- Sangeetha as Somaraju's sister
- Kalpana as Janaki, Somaraju's daughter
- Sireesha Sougandh as Somaraju's daughter-in-law

== Soundtrack ==
Tholu Bommalata

Soundtrack album by Suresh Bobbili
- Released: 18 November 2019
- Recorded: 2019
- Genre: Feature film soundtrack
- Length: 19:50
- Language: Telugu
- Label: Aditya Music
- Producer: Suresh Bobbili
External audio
- Audio Jukebox on YouTube

Music composed by Suresh Bobbili. Lyrics were written by Chaitanya Prasad. Music released on ADITYA Music Company.

No.	Title	Singer(s)	Length
1.	"Goppadira Manishi Puttuka"	Vijay Yesudas	4:19
2.	"Manasara Mansara (M)"	Sid Sriram	3:14
3.	"Aakasamaa"	Hemachandra	3:58
4.	"Manasara Mansara (F)"	Chinmayi	3:13
5.	"Netho Poti Paduthu"	Yazin Nizar	2:56
6.	"Manasara Mansara (Duet)"	Sid Sriram, Chinmayi	3:12
7.	"Yennenno Anandalu"	Anurag Kulkarni	3:54
Total length:			19:50
