= Viswant Duddumpudi =

Indian actor

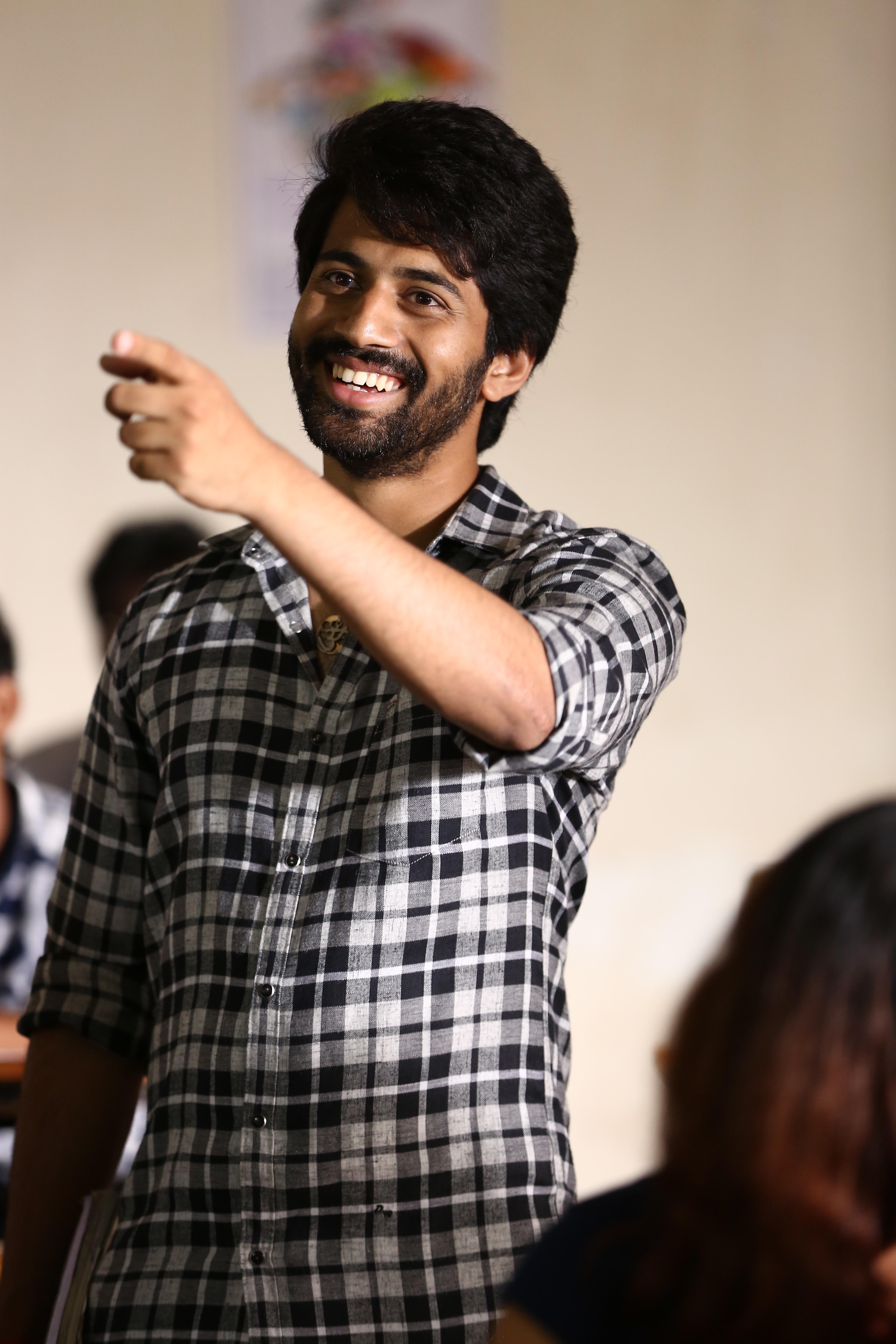
- Born: 20 December 1993 (age 32); Samarlakota, Andhra Pradesh, India
- Occupation: Actor
- Years active: 2015–present

Viswant Duddumpudi is an Indian actor who works in Telugu films. He made his debut with Kerintha (2015).

== Early life ==
Duddumpudi was born in Samarlakota, Andhra Pradesh. He started his schooling in Timpany School Visakhapatnam after which he changed to Kakinada and then to Hyderabad. After completing his intermediate in Vizag FIITJEE, he went to Tamil Nadu to pursue his Engineering in PSG Institute Of Advanced Studies at Coimbatore, India and then to State university of New York for further studies.

== Career ==
Viswant Duddumpudi first caught attention with his debut film Kerintha, directed by Sai Kiran Adivi. Prior to Kerintha, Duddumpudi was shortlisted for a few films, but his education stopped him from acting. He received a call from Kerintha's director after doing auditions and seeing the video reels sent by him.

== Filmography ==
Year	Title	Role	Notes
2015	Kerintha	Sid	
2016	Manamantha	Abhiram	
2017	Nenu Mee Kalyan	Kalyan	TV show
2018	Crazy Crazy Feeling	Abhi	
2019	Jersey	Nandu	
2019	Tholu Bommalata	Rushi	
2020	O Pitta Katha	Krish	
2022	Aa Ammayi Gurinchi Meeku Cheppali	Deepak	
2022	Boyfriend for Hire	Arjun	
2023	Katha Venuka Katha	Ashwin	
2023	Matchfixing	Kishore	
2024	Namo	Nagesh	
2024	Hide N Seek	Shiva	
2024	C.D: Criminal or Devil	Sidhu	
2025	Game Changer	Raghav	
2025	Sundarakanda	Dr Sanjay	
2025	Daksha: The Deadly Conspiracy	Vikram	

=== Music video ===
Year	Album	Language	Music composer	Singers	Co-artists
2022	Aedhu Nijam Enn Kannmani	Tamil	Subhash Anand	Chinmayi, Haricharan	Meghali Meenakshi, Jinal Joshi, Joyita Chatterjee
2022	Aedhi Nijam Naa Praeyasi	Telugu	Subhash Anand	Chinmayi, Yazin Nizar	Meghali Meenakshi, Jinal Joshi, Joyita Chatterjee
