= Tuneega Tuneega =

- Directed by: M. S. Raju
- Written by: M. S. Raju
- Produced by: Maganti Ramchandran
- Starring: Sumanth Ashwin; Rhea Chakraborty
- Cinematography: S. Gopal Reddy
- Edited by: K. V. Krishna Reddy
- Music by: Karthik Raja
- Production company: Padmini Arts
- Distributed by: Sri Venkateswara Creations; 14 Reels Entertainment (overseas)
- Release date: 20 July 2012
- Country: India
- Language: Telugu

Tuneega Tuneega is a 2012 Indian Telugu-language romantic drama film written and directed by M. S. Raju. Starring Sumanth Ashwin and Rhea Chakraborty, the film is produced by Maganti Ramji under Padmini Arts banner. Distributed by Dil Raju under Sri Venkateswara Creations banner, the film was released worldwide on 20 July 2012.

== Plot ==
Businessman Ravindra Babu and his cook "Madurai" Ramaswamy are childhood friends who stay together. Their children Karthik and Nidhi are of the same age but they hate each other and torment each other by playing pranks. After a while, Nidhi is sent abroad for her further studies.

Years later, Nidhi comes back and meets Karthik at a family function. Slowly, Karthik and Nidhi fall in love despite hating each other as children. However, Nidhi's family wants her to marry Rahul. How Karthik wins back Nidhi forms the rest of the story.

== Cast ==
- Sumanth Ashwin as Karthik Ramaswamy
- Rhea Chakraborty as Nidhi
  - Shriya Sharma as Young Nidhi
- Prabhu as "Madurai" Ramaswamy
- Nagendra Babu as Ravindra Babu, chairman of RR Group of Companies
- Manisha Yadav as Maithri
- Vasundhara Kashyap as Neethu
- Abinaya as Kavya
- Sayaji Shinde as Dr. James, the narrator
- Paruchuri Venkateswara Rao as Chinna Konasimha
- Chandra Mohan as Acharya Ramachandra Siddhanthi Priest
- Brahmanandam as Prabhakar
- MS Narayana as Narayana
- Dharmavarapu Subramanyam as ACP Subbu
- Vijayachander as Ravindra Babu's father
- Geetha as Ravindra Babu's sister
- Seetha as Rani
- Vinod Kumar as Ravindra Babu's brother-in-law
- Jyothi as Hamsa
- AVS as Subbu
- Mrinal Dutt as Rahul
- Gundu Hanumantha Rao as police officer
- Y. Kasi Viswanath as Maithri's father
- Abhishek as Gopal
- Shafi
- Delhi Rajeswari
- Kadambari Kiran
- Fish Venkat (special appearance in the song "Tuneega Tuneega")
- Aishwarya as Chinna Konasimha's wife (in portrait)

== Production ==
Sumanth Ashwin, son of director and producer M. S. Raju, is being introduced with the film. The title is inspired by the Telugu song 'Tunnega Tuneega' from the film Manasantha Nuvve, which was also produced by M. S. Raju. Reports of Sumanth's debut were afloat since 2007 in the media. M. S. Raju confirmed that he considered Sumanth for the lead role in Vaana. However, M. S. Raju decided not to introduce him with Vaana as the character needed an experienced actor. In December 2007, Sumanth's debut film under the direction of Teja was announced.

In January 2011, it was announced that V. N. Aditya was no longer part of the project and M. S. Raju would direct.

== Soundtrack ==
Tuneega Tuneega

Soundtrack album by Karthik Raja
- Released: 10 January 2012
- Recorded: 2012
- Genre: Feature film soundtrack
- Length: 44:23
- Language: Telugu
- Label: Aditya Music
- Producer: Karthik Raja

Karthik Raja chronology
Rettaisuzhi (2010)	Tuneega Tuneega (2012)	Brahmotsavam (2016)

The soundtrack was composed by Karthik Raja, his first Telugu film. The album consists of eight songs: four were penned by Krishna Chaitanya and three by Sirivennela Sitaramasastri. The soundtrack album was released on 10 June 2012 at Lalitha Kala Thoranam in Hyderabad. It was released through Aditya Music label. In a music review, Karthik wrote, "Karthik Raja’s music is fresh and vastly different from his usual sound – looks like he has used his break well!"

Track listing
No.	Title	Lyrics	Artist(s)	Length
1.	"Mike Testing" (based on "Zombie" by The Cranberries)	Krishna Chaitanya	Ranjith	04:50
2.	"Tuneega Tuneega" ("Lemon Tree" by Fool's Garden)	Krishna Chaitanya	MK Balaji	05:05
3.	"Dhigu Dhigu Jabilee" (based on "Summer" from Kikujiro)	Sirivennela Sitaramasastri	Karthik, Rita	07:01
4.	"Hatsoff Oyi Brahma"	Sirivennela Sitaramasastri	Tippu	05:39
5.	"Pedavanchullo Prema"	Krishna Chaitanya	Rahul Nambiar	04:42
6.	"Ahista Ahista"	Sirivennela Sitaramasastri	Karthik, Rita	05:11
7.	"Dhoodi Pinja Lanti Pilla" (based on "Hasta Siempre, Comandante")	Krishna Chaitanya	Rahul Nambiar	06:01
8.	"Merise Ninge"	Bhuvanachandra	Chorus	05:54
Total length:				44:23

== Critical reception ==
The Times of India rated the film two-and-a-half stars out of five, and stated that "The film just doesn't come together visually. It lacks the freshness and feel of a new film. The lack of novelty across the board proves to be its undoing." Vishnupriya Bhandaram of The Hindu wrote that "Good stories are easy to understand but in Tuneega Tuneega, confusion reigns over the story and the screenplay and a lack of connect with the characters would perhaps be the most natural of reactions." A critic from Deccan Herald wrote, "While Ashwin, with his director-father providing him a launch vehicle, tries to make personable debut, Rhea oozes oomph and prettiness. Gopal Reddy’s cinematography, which adds lustre, is the saving grace of an otherwise predictable outing". A critic from IANS wrote, "Raju presents a youthful love story, but frankly it reminds you of the films made in seventies and eighties".

== Awards ==
=== CineMAA Awards ===
- CineMAA Awards Best Male Debut (2013): Sumanth Ashwin
