= Lovers (2014 film) =

2014 Indian Telugu-language film

- Directed by: Harinath
- Screenplay by: Maruthi
- Story by: Harinath
- Produced by: B. Mahendra Babu; Naga Vamsi; Maruthi (presenter)
- Starring: Sumanth Ashwin; Nanditha
- Cinematography: V. Malhar Bhatt Joshi
- Edited by: S. B. Uddhav
- Music by: Jeevan Babu
- Production companies: Maya Bazar Movies; Maruthi Talkies
- Release date: 15 August 2014
- Country: India
- Language: Telugu
- Box office: ₹7.8 crore distributors' share

Lovers is a 2014 Indian Telugu-language romantic comedy film directed by Harinath and starring Sumanth Ashwin and Nanditha. The film was a box office success. The film was inspired by the 2012 Tamil film Leelai.

== Plot ==
Siddhu, portrayed by Sumanth Ashwin, is a college student seeking romantic companionship. His relationships with Geetha (Tejaswini) and Soumya (Shamili) end in heartbreak, with Chitra Subramanyam (Nanditha) being the common factor. Unaware of Chitra's role, Siddhu desires revenge.

In an unexpected turn, Siddhu falls for a mysterious woman who turns out to be Chitra. The story explores their intertwined destinies and whether they can overcome their past grievances to find love."

== Cast ==
- Sumanth Ashwin as Siddhu
- Nanditha as Chitra Subramanyam
- Tejaswi Madivada as Geetha
- Varshini Sounderajan as Soumya
- Saptagiri as Suresh
- Chandini as Soumya
- M. S. Narayana
- Sai Kumar Pampana as Suresh
- Duvvasi Mohan
- Anitha Chowdary

== Soundtrack ==
The music is composed by J. B.

== Reception ==
A critic from Deccan Chronicle wrote that "The film is worth a watch just for Saptagiri’s histrionics". A critic from The Times of India opined that "The story isnt as striking as the performances. Watch it for Saptagiri's comedy". A critic from Idlebrain.com wrote that "Plus points are spicy dialogues and entertainment provided by Saptagiri and Sai Kumar Pampana. A better handling of romance/emotions coupled with an arresting screenplay in second half is needed for an impressive output". A critic from 123Telugu said that "On the whole, Lovers clicks only because of the entertaining second half, and Sapathagiri’s hilarious comedy".
