= Kerintha =

- Release poster
- Directed by: Sai Kiran Adivi
- Written by: Sai Kiran Adivi; Abburi Ravi; Hari; Vijay K. Chakravarthy; Venky Atluri; Mamidala Tirupati
- Produced by: Dil Raju
- Starring: Sumanth Ashwin; Sri Divya; Viswant; Sukrithi; Tejaswi Madivada
- Cinematography: Vijay K. Chakravarthy
- Edited by: Madhu
- Music by: Mickey J. Meyer
- Production company: Sri Venkateswara Creations
- Release date: 12 June 2015
- Running time: 140 minutes
- Country: India
- Language: Telugu
- Box office: ₹5 crore distributors' share

Kerintha is a 2015 Indian Telugu-language romantic comedy film directed by Sai Kiran Adivi. This film is produced by Dil Raju under the banner Sri Venkateswara Creations. It stars Sumanth Ashwin, Sri Divya,Viswant, Sukrithi, Tejaswi Madivada, and Parvateesam in main roles. The film was released on 12 June 2015.

== Plot ==
Jai, Siddharth and Bhavana are childhood friends who study in the same college. They are joined by Nookaraju and Priya in the college. Soon they become a batch of cool buddies. As Nookaraju alias Nooks is a farmer's son from a village near Srikakulam, life in college turns out to be a culture shock for him and he finds it difficult to cope with studies. Bhavana comes to his rescue and they become thickest pals of all. Meanwhile, Sid falls in love with Priya the minute he sets eyes on her. He proposes to her with the help of friends and the touching way in which he proposes floors her, and she instantly accepts his love. Priya being a rich child, she showers gifts on Sid. She also pesters him saying she wants to meet his mother. But Sid, who is afraid of his strict mother, a principal of another college keeps postponing. Moreover, he also hidden the fact that he is doing music course instead of Mca course. Meanwhile, Jai rejects proposal from his classmate Tanisha revealing that he had fallen for a girl at first sight in a bus, but doesn't know her whereabouts and his only clue is the girl's lost Jumki (earring). He starts to search for her and finally tracks her with his intelligence. Manasvini is a career-oriented doctor who thinks relationships are hurdles in achieving her goals. She aspires to make it big by going for higher studies in Australia. Jai has super cool parents who support his love. While Jai tries to woo Manasvini, she keeps avoiding him. Jai is an optimistic, all is well type of guy who goes by his heart. He solves other people's problems and love issues and spreads happiness around. Everyone feels and says that he spells magic in their lives and even Manaswini likes him when he helped to sort out things in her friend Sonia's marriage.

Things take a U-turn when they face the harsh realities of their respective lives. Priya plans a great birthday surprise for Sid in a mall and while everything is going smoothly Sid finds his Mom in the mall and when Priya finally wishes him he ignores her saying that he doesn't know her. Priya is completely shell shocked and though Sid tries to reason with her later she refuses and asks him to first muster enough courage to speak to his mom. Jai, too, goes through bad luck as Manaswini thinks that love will distract her and she is planning for higher studies in Australia and thus can't say yes to Jai. Jai ultimately bids her goodbye and continues his life with a hope she will come back.

In the case of Nooks, he falls in a trap on online crime by befriending a fake girl account on Facebook mistaking her to be his classmate Shalini and transfers his father's hard-earned money into her account. Bhavana tries to warn him but he shouts at her making her angry and distancing herself from him. Later understands that he's been cheated and tries to harass Shalini under the influence of alcohol. Shalini files a police complaint and his friends come to his rescue. He then learns the value of friendship through Jai's words. After realising his mistake he asks Bhavana to accept his apologies but she refuses.

Sid on other hand patches with Priya by saying that he has spoken to his mother and she has accepted Priya and wants her to meet the following week. In the turn of events Priya finds Sid's mother shopping in the mall and she approaches her but Sid's mother just says she doesn't know Priya and Sid's has not made any mention of her. Priya finally confronts Sid and says that she cannot tolerate any more lies and is leaving India permanently. Nooks, on the other hand, learns that Bhavana is leaving to her hometown. Jai encourages both Sid and Nooks to open up their hearts and console their loved ones without having to lose them.

Nooks reaches to bus stand and opens up his feelings to Bhavana to which she reacts positively. Mustering enough courage, Sid takes his mother to airport and says that he loves Priya and want to marry her. He also reveals about his music course. Angry at first Sid's mother agree to it and asks Priya to help her contacting her parents. In the end, it is shown Bhavana is speaking to Nooks' parents (they are married) and going to attend a marriage of Jai. At the registrar's office, Manaswini turns up along with Sonia and confesses to Jai that she loves him and wants to marry him. But it turns out to be marriage of Sid and Priya. Now nooks explains the actual story that he learned that Manaswini still loves Jai through Sonia and he wanted her to open up so he lied to Manaswini that Jai is marrying Tanisha. This with uniting couples the movie ends on happy note.

== Cast ==
- Sumanth Ashwin as Jai
- Sri Divya as Manaswini
- Viswant as Siddharth
- Parvateesam as Nookaraju "Nook"
- Sukrithi as Bhavana
- Tejaswi Madivada as Priya
- Priyanka Naidu as Sonia
- Pragathi as Siddharth's mother
- Priya as Sonia's mother
- Sameer as Sonia's father
- Nithya Naresh as Tanisha
- Anitha Chowdary as Jai's mother
- Jeedigunta Sridhar as Jai's father
- Shankar Melkote as Church father
- Kedar Shankara as Siddharth's father
- Usha Sri as Siddharth's sister
- Allu Ramesh as Nookaraju's father
- Jessie as Shalini

== Production ==
After producing big-budget movies, Dil Raju announced that he will be producing a low-budget movie with new actors under the direction of Sai Kiran Adivi.

== Soundtrack ==
The music was composed by Mickey J. Meyer and was released on Aditya Music.

Kerintha

Soundtrack album by Mickey J. Meyer
- Released: 25 May 2015
- Recorded: 2015
- Genre: Soundtrack
- Length: 23:52
- Label: Aditya Music
- Producer: Mickey J. Meyer

Mickey J. Meyer chronology
Mukunda (2014)	Kerintha (2015)	Buguri (2015)

All tracks are written by Ramajogayya Sastry.

Track-List
No.	Title	Singer(s)	Length
1.	"Kerintha Song"	Haricharan	4:30
2.	"Mila Mila"	Karthik	4:16
3.	"Jagadeka Veera"	Anjana Sowmya	3:31
4.	"Thanks 2 Zindagi"	Rahul Nambiar, Deepu, Shilpa	3:27
5.	"Sumagandhaala"	Karthik	4:31
6.	"Ye Kadha"	Jonita Gandhi	3:37
Total length:			23:52

== Release and reception ==
The movie was released worldwide on 12 June 2015.

Sangeetha Devi Dundoo of The Hindu wrote, "Kerintha is a clean, entertaining one-time watch if you like campus stories". Suresh Kavirayani of the Deccan Chronicle wrote, "After watching the regular masala, heavy action-high drama noisy films, Kerintha is like a breath of fresh air".

== Awards ==
- Parvatheesam was nominated for Best Male Debut in Telugu at 5th South Indian International Movie Awards.
