= Hometown (Indian TV series) =

Indian comedy drama television series

- Release poster
- Genre: Comedy; Drama
- Directed by: Srikanth Reddy Palle
- Starring: Rajeev Kanakala; Jhansi; Annie; Prajwal; Sairam
- Music by: Suresh Bobbili
- Country of origin: India
- Original language: Telugu
- No. of seasons: 1
- No. of episodes: 5

Production
- Executive producer: Sreekesh Bompally
- Producers: Naveen Medaram; Rajashekar Medaram
- Cinematography: Devdeep Gandhi Kundu
- Editor: Carthic Ved
- Running time: 25–30 minutes
- Production companies: MNOP; Amogha Arts

Original release
- Network: Aha
- Release: 4 April 2025

Hometown is an Indian Telugu-language comedy drama television series created and directed by Revanth Levaka. The series features Rajeev Kanakala, Jhansi, Annie and Prajwal in primary roles.

It was released on 4 February 2025 on Aha.

== Cast ==
- Rajeev Kanakala as Prasad
- Jhansi
- Prajwal Yadma as Srikanth
- Annie as Jyothy
- U. Sai Ram
- Anirudh Bhaskar
- Sravya Dimple Vippagunta
- Abhay BR
- Anji Valguman
- Mallesh Balastu

== Episodes ==
No.	Title	Directed by	Written by	Original release date
1	"Cricket World Cup"	Srikanth Reddy Palle	Srikanth Reddy Palle	4 April 2025
2	"Weekly Magazine"	Srikanth Reddy Palle	Srikanth Reddy Palle	4 April 2025
3	"Love"	Srikanth Reddy Palle	Srikanth Reddy Palle	4 April 2025
4	"Facebook"	Srikanth Reddy Palle	Srikanth Reddy Palle	4 April 2025
5	"Fly"	Srikanth Reddy Palle	Srikanth Reddy Palle	4 April 2025

== Reception ==
OTTPlay wrote that "Home Town is a series with a routine storyline that could have benefited from more comedy and novelty. However, it falls into the "been there, done that" category, with most scenes evoking a déjà vu feeling rather than offering anything fresh or exciting". BH Harsh of Cinema Express rated it 2 out of 5 and wrote that "Home Town remains bland and half-hearted even during its most emotionally potent moments".
