= Diamond Ratnababu =

Indian film director

Diamond Ratna Babu is an Indian film director, who has worked in the Telugu movie industry. He has directed movies including Aadi Saikumar-starrer Burra Katha and Mohan Babu-starrer Son Of India.

== Filmography ==
Year	Film	Director	Writer
2007	Bahumati	No	Dialogue
2008	Deepavali	No	Dialogue
2015	Sher	No	Yes
2017	Luckunnodu	No	Yes
2018	Gayatri	No	Yes
2019	Burra Katha	Yes	Story
2022	Son of India	Yes	Yes
2023	Unstoppable	Yes	Yes
