= Mishti Chakraborty =

Indian actress

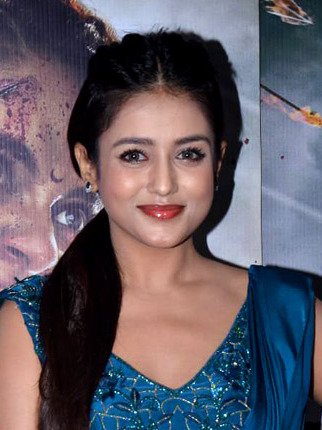
- Mishti at the special screening of Manikarnika: The Queen of Jhansi in 2019
- Born: Indrani Chakraborty; Calcutta, West Bengal, India
- Education: BA (Hons) in English Literature
- Alma mater: University of Calcutta
- Occupations: Actress and Model
- Years active: 2013–present
- Height: 1.63 m (5 ft 4 in)

Indrani Chakraborty, known by her stage name Mishti, is an Indian actress who predominantly appears in Telugu films. She starred in films such as Kaanchi: The Unbreakable (2014), Chinnadana Nee Kosam (2014), Adam Joan (2017), Brihaspathi (2018), Burra Katha (2019), O Saathiya (2023), among others.

== Early life ==
Mishti was born as Indrani Chakraborty in a Bengali Brahmin family in Kolkata, West Bengal, India. Her mother Beena Chakraborty is a housewife, and her father is a construction businessman. She graduated in English literature from the University of Calcutta.

She began to use the name Mishti professionally after 2014.

== Career ==
She made her Bollywood debut with Subhash Ghai's film Kaanchi: The Unbreakable, and her Telugu film debut with the Nithiin-A. Karunakaran film Chinnadana Nee Kosam, and her Malayalam film debut with Prithviraj Sukumaran and Jinu Abraham's film Adam Joan.

Mishti's next Telugu film, Columbus, stars Sumanth Ashwin and is produced by MS Raju. She returned to Bollywood with Indra Kumar's Great Grand Masti, the third film in the Masti film series. In 2017, she appeared in Srijit Mukherji's historical film Begum Jaan, alongside Naseeruddin Shah and Vidya Balan. The Film was set in the Backdrop of a Brothel and she played Shabnam in the film. The film was an average grosser at Box Office India.

== Filmography ==
Year	Film	Role	Language	Notes
2013	Porichoi	Rimi	Bengali	
2014	Kaanchi: The Unbreakable	Kaanchi	Hindi	
2014	Chinnadana Nee Kosam	Nandini Reddy	Telugu	
2015	Columbus	Indu	Telugu	
2016	Great Grand Masti	Rekha Meet Mehta	Hindi	
2017	Begum Jaan	Shabnam	Hindi	
2017	Babu Baga Busy	Radha	Telugu	
2017	Adam Joan	Amy	Malayalam	
2018	Brihaspathi	Shalini	Kannada	
2018	Semma Botha Aagathey	Madhu	Tamil	
2018	Sarabha	Divya	Telugu	
2019	Manikarnika	Kashibai	Hindi	
2019	Burra Katha	Happy	Telugu	
2022	Shadow Assassins	Rimli Bora	Hindi	
2023	O Saathiya	Keerthi	Telugu	
