= Babu Baga Busy =

2017 film directed by Naveen Medaram

- Theatrical release poster
- Directed by: Naveen Medaram
- Screenplay by: Naveen Medaram
- Story by: Harshavardhan Kulkarni
- Based on: Hunterrr
- Produced by: Abhishek Nama
- Starring: Srinivas Avasarala; Mishti
- Cinematography: Suresh Bhargawa
- Edited by: S. B. Uddhav
- Music by: Sunil Kashyap
- Production company: Abhishek Pictures
- Release date: 5 May 2017
- Running time: 126 min
- Country: India
- Language: Telugu

Babu Baga Busy is a 2017 Indian Telugu-language adult comedy film directed by Naveen Medaram, in his debut, and produced by Abhishek Nama, under Abhishek Pictures. It is the official remake of the 2015 Hindi adult comedy, Hunterrr. The film features Srinivas Avasarala, Mishti, Sreemukhi, Tejaswi Madivada, and Supriya Aysola in lead roles.

== Cast ==
- Srinivas Avasarala as Madhav 'Maddy'
- Mishti as Radha
- Tejaswi Madivada as Parvathi 'Paru' Menon
- Supriya Aysola as Chandrika
- Sreemukhi as Shobha N. T.
- Priyadarshi Pulikonda as Chiru
- Ravi Prakash as Uttej
- Tanikella Bharani as Madhav's father
- Sudha as Madhav's mother
- Aadarsh Balakrishna as Chax
- Annapoorna as Uttej's grandmother
- Posani Krishna Murali as Cop
- Avantika Vandanapu as Anitha

== Soundtrack ==
Babu Baga Busy

Soundtrack album by Sunil Kashyap
- Genre: Feature film soundtrack
- Length: 19:15
- Label: E3 Talkies
- Director: Naveen Medaram

Songs were released on E3 Talkies.

No.	Title	Singer(s)	Length
1.	"Babu Baga Busy"	Vedala Hemachandra	2:22
2.	"Neela Evarulere"	Yazin Nizar	4:57
3.	"Veedu Hunter"	Sunil Kashyap	2:24
4.	"Nagumomey"	Khamosh Shah	3:21
5.	"Ee Pilla"	Vedala Hemachandra	3:03
6.	"Pasi Hrudayale"	Sunil Kasyap	4:42
Total length:			19:15
