= Burra Katha (film) =

2019 Telugu science fiction comedy film

- Theateral release poster
- Directed by: Diamond Ratnababu
- Screenplay by: Syed; Prasad Kamineni; Siddabattula Kiran; Suresh Aarapaati; Divya Bhavana Didla
- Story by: Diamond Ratna Babu
- Produced by: Srinkanth Deepala; Kishore; M. V. Kiran Reddy
- Starring: Aadi Saikumar; Mishti Chakraborty; Rajendra Prasad
- Cinematography: C. Ramprasad
- Edited by: M. R. Varma
- Music by: Sai Karthik
- Production companies: Deepala Arts; Tough Ened Studios Ltd
- Release date: 5 July 2019
- Running time: 126 mins
- Country: India
- Language: Telugu

Burra Katha (transl. Brain Story) is a 2019 Telugu-language science fiction comedy film, produced by Srikanth Deepala, Kishore and M. V. Kiran Reddy under Deepala Arts & Tough Ened Studios banners and directed by Diamond Ratna Babu. It stars Aadi Saikumar, Mishti Chakraborty, Rajendra Prasad in the lead roles, and music composed by Sai Karthik.

== Cast ==
- Aadi Saikumar as Abhiram "Abhi / Ram" (Two Different Brain Personality Disorder)
- Mishti Chakraborty as Happy, Abhi/Ram's love interest
- Naira Shah as Aascharya, Ram's fake love interest
- Rajendra Prasad as Eeswara Rao
- Abhimanyu Singh as Gagan Vihari
- Abhimanyu Pandey as Jaggi
- Posani Krishna Murali as Neurosurgeon Prabhudas
- Prudhvi Raj as Bongaram Hema
- Fish Venkat
- Prabhas Sreenu
- Jayasri Rachakonda as Happy's mother
- Chammak Chandra
- Mahesh Achanta
- Geetha Singh
- Mani Chandana as Abhi's/Ram's mother
- Gayatri Gupta

== Soundtrack ==
Burra Katha

Soundtrack album by Sai Karthik
- Released: 2019
- Genre: Feature film soundtrack
- Length: 14:06
- Language: Telugu
- Label: Aditya Music
- Producer: Sai Karthik

Sai Karthik chronology
Lover (2018)	Burra Katha (2019)	Tenali Ramakrishna BA. BL (2019)
External audio
- Audio Jukebox on YouTube

Music was composed by Sai Karthik. Music was released on ADITYA Music Company.

No.	Title	Lyrics	Singer(s)	Length
1.	"Andanike"	Bhaskarabhatla	Hemachandra	3:10
2.	"Okate Okate"	Krishnakanth	Anurag Kulkarni	3:48
3.	"Anaganaga"	Bhaskarabhatla	Dhanunjay	3:22
4.	"Neevalle Neevalle"	Bhaskarabhatla	Kaala Bhairava	3:49
Total length:				14:06

== Production ==
The film shooting began on 17 August 2018. The film's core plot was inspired from Aparichitudu (2005), which was directed by Shankar.

== Reception ==
Burra Katha was reviewed by, The Hindu The Times of India, 123telugu.com, NTV, and The Hans India.
