= Gayatri (2018 film) =

2018 film by Madan

- Poster
- Directed by: Madan
- Written by: Diamond Ratnababu
- Story by: Gousul Alam
- Produced by: Mohan Babu
- Starring: Mohan Babu; Vishnu Manchu; Nikhila Vimal; Shriya Saran; Anasuya Bharadwaj
- Cinematography: Sarvesh Murari
- Music by: S. Thaman
- Production company: Sree Lakshmi Prasanna Pictures
- Release date: 9 February 2018
- Running time: 125 minutes
- Country: India
- Language: Telugu

Gayatri is a 2018 Indian Telugu-language action drama film written and directed by Madan and written by Diamond Ratna Babu. Produced by Mohan Babu, the film stars himself in a dual role as hero and villain along with Nikhila Vimal, Shriya Saran and Anasuya Bharadwaj. Mohan Babu's son Vishnu Manchu plays the younger version of one of his characters. The film also features Brahmanandam, Ali, Kota Srinivasa Rao, Tanikella Bharani and Posani Krishna Murali in supporting roles. The film is an official remake of Bangladeshi movie Aynabaji directed by Amitabh Reza Chowdhury. The music was composed by S. Thaman with cinematography by Sarvesh Murari. The film released on 9 February 2018.

This film is a tribute to director Dasari Narayana Rao, who died on 30 May 2017.

== Plot ==
Dasari Sivaji, a stage artist, runs Sarada Sadan, a home for destitute children, named after his late wife Sharada. One day, Sivaji rescues a young woman named Gayatri from a group of goons. Later, when she calls him, Sivaji notices that her phone wallpaper is a picture of Sharada and realizes that Gayatri is his long-lost daughter. Sivaji attends Gayatri's college graduation, where she declares that she never knew what her father looked like but believes he was a heartless man who sold her for 1,000 rupees to buy alcohol. Devastated, Sivaji leaves for a temple. Gayatri later learns from Sivaji's friend Prasad that Sivaji is her father, and she reads Sivaji's diary to uncover his past.

Years earlier, a young Sivaji, an orphan with a passion for acting, fell in love with and married Sharada. When Sharada was diagnosed with stage three pelvic cancer, Sivaji's friend Giri suggested that Sivaji spend two days in jail in exchange for money to fund her treatment. However, Sivaji was kept in jail for two weeks, and when he was released, Giri drunkenly told him that Sharada and their unborn child had died. Heartbroken, Sivaji attempted suicide, but Giri saved him at the cost of his own life. Before dying, Giri revealed that the baby had actually survived but was kidnapped from the orphanage where he had left her. The child, Gayatri, was raised in Ramanujam Orphanage. On her birthday, she is gifted a photo of her mother Sharada, who died as soon as she delivered her.

In the present, Gayatri and Prasad try to find Sivaji. At the temple, Sivaji is abducted by goons working for his doppelgänger, Gayatri Patel, a criminal under trial for burning down a hospital. Patel is soon arrested and sentenced to death, but Sivaji becomes mistakenly implicated in the case. In jail, Sivaji confesses his identity to jailer Simhachalam, who already knows the truth. Patel later calls Sivaji and reveals that the witness responsible for his death sentence is none other than Sivaji's daughter, Gayatri, vowing revenge on both of them.

Soon, Patel (as Sivaji) visits Gayatri's home. Unaware of the deception, Gayatri apologizes to him for her harsh words and reconciles with him. Meanwhile, journalist Shreshta Jayaram informs Sivaji in jail that Patel has assumed his identity and murdered Prasad. Shreshta later interviews Patel and Gayatri at their house, covertly revealing to Gayatri that her real father is in jail. Shocked but conflicted, Gayatri defends the man she believes is her father. In jail, Sivaji (as Patel) expresses his final wish—to perform on stage once more. However, Patel (as Sivaji) wants to replace Sivaji and attempts to flee to the US. The public pressures Patel to fulfill this request, and he reluctantly agrees, earning widespread applause.

Gayatri and Patel then visit the jail, where Gayatri is finally reunited with her real father, Sivaji. It is revealed that Gayatri was worried about the safety of the hospital children, which was why she defended Patel earlier. Recognizing Sivaji's humanitarian nature, Simhachalam prepares for Patel's execution. However, Patel attacks Sivaji, leading to a violent confrontation inside the jail. The police struggle to identify the real Sivaji, but Gayatri manages to shoot Patel dead. The film ends with Sivaji and Gayatri leaving the jail.

== Cast ==
- Mohan Babu in a dual role as:
  - Dasari Sivaji
    - Vishnu Manchu as Young Sivaji
  - Gayatri Patel
- Nikhila Vimal as Gayatri
- Shriya Saran as Sharada
- Anasuya Bharadwaj as Shreshta Jayaram
- Brahmanandam as Loknatham
- Ali as Salman Khan
- Kota Srinivasa Rao as Judge
- Tanikella Bharani as Lawyer
- Posani Krishna Murali as Gayatri Patel's lawyer
- Supreeth Reddy as Kader
- Naramalli Sivaprasad as Sivaprasad
- Raghu Babu as Journalist
- Nagineedu as Simhachalam
- Satyam Rajesh as Syamala Rao
- Fish Venkat as Gayatri Patel's henchman
- Jeeva as Narsing Rao
- Prudhvi Raj as Minister Shankar Rao
- Geetha Singh as Salman's wife
- Raja Ravindra as Studio Owner
- Rajsekhar Aningi as Public Prosecutor
- Giri Babu as Man in Crowd
- Scarlett Mellish Wilson as an item number

== Production ==
After a break of two years, Mohan Babu announced the film Gayatri, where he will be playing a dual role, the hero and the villain, produced by himself under the banner Sree Lakshmi Prasanna Pictures co-starring his son Vishnu Manchu and Shriya Saran. Actors Brahmanandam, Posani Krishna Murali, Kota Srinivasa Rao, Tanikella Bharani, and Ali were signed to play important roles with S. Thaman providing the music. The film was shot at Tirupati and Ramoji Film City. Actor Nandamuri Balakrishna, who was shooting for Jai Simha, visited Gayatri crew and wished success. Action director Kanal Kannan captured a fight sequence between Mohan Babu's that lasted for 11 days using Nero motion control rig used extensively for VFX. The first look of the film was launched on 25 December 2017 and Vishnu Manchu-Shriya Saran's first look was launched on 1 January 2018.

== Soundtrack ==
Gayatri

Soundtrack album by S. Thaman
- Released: 2018
- Recorded: 2018
- Genre: Soundtrack
- Length: 26:57
- Language: Telugu
- Label: Silly Monks Music
- Producer: S. Thaman

S. Thaman chronology
Sketch (2018)	Gayatri (2018)	Achari America Yatra (2018)

The music was composed by S. Thaman and released on Silly Monks Music.

Track-List
No.	Title	Lyrics	Singer(s)	Length
1.	"Jai Hanuman"	Suddala Ashok Teja	Shankar Mahadevan	5:25
2.	"Thella Thella"	Ramajogayya Sastry	Madhu Balakrishnan	4:02
3.	"Oka Nuvvu Oka Nenu"	Ramajogayya Sastry	Jubin Nautiyal, Shreya Ghoshal	5:39
4.	"Vekuvamma"	Suddala Ashok Teja	S. P. Balasubrahmanyam	4:09
5.	"Sarasamaha"	Ramajogayya Sastry	Ramya Behara	4:31
6.	"Ravana Brahmma"	Ramajogayya Sastry	Mano	3:11
Total length:				26:57

== Reception ==
Deccan Chronicle rated the film with 2.5 stars and wrote, "the film is strictly for Mohan Babu fans only and for others, the choice remain with us". Firstpost wrote that the film could have been a taut thriller, but doesn't quite hit the mark saying Gayatri is a film tailor-made for Mohan Babu. New Indian Express wrote that the "film packs a punch for the commendable performance of Mohan Babu and makes for a decent watch".
