= Tejaswi Madivada =

Indian actress and model

- Born: Hyderabad, Andhra Pradesh (now in Telangana), India
- Occupation: Actress
- Years active: 2013–present

Tejaswi Madivada is an Indian actress and model who works predominantly in Telugu films and television shows. A dance tutor turned actress, she has debuted with a recurring role in Seethamma Vaakitlo Sirimalle Chettu (2013) and had her breakthrough with Ice Cream (2014). She was a contestant in the reality show Bigg Boss 2 (2018).

== Early life and education ==
Madivada studied at Begumpet Air Force College, Hyderabad. She studied Mass communication and Journalism at the St Francis College for Women in Hyderabad. She later worked part-time as a freelance dance instructor with Twist n Turns and took classes for MNCs like HSBC, Wipro, Franklin Templeton and in schools like Nasr School for Girls. She had worked in various short films there one of the short film called "Dhanam Mulam Idham Jagath" short film got her recognition for her negative shades. She participated at Miss Dabur Gulabari 2011, a beauty pageant, where she was the second runner-up and which reportedly got her first film offer.

== Career ==
Madivada made her acting debut in 2013 with a supporting role in the family drama film Seethamma Vaakitlo Sirimalle Chettu. Next year she was seen in further supporting roles in Manam and in Nithin's Heart Attack, before landing her first lead role in Ram Gopal Varma's horror film Ice Cream. The film made the headlines after it was reported that Madivada had appeared nude in one scene. Ice Cream received mixed reviews from critics but was a commercial blockbuster.

Her next releases, Lovers, Anukshanam, another Ram Gopal Varma directorial, Kranthi Madhav's Malli Malli Idhi Rani Roju, in which she portrayed Nithya Menen's daughter, Srimanthudu, and Pandaga Chesko saw her playing secondary characters. Her subsequent projects were Omkar's Raju Gari Gadi, Oorvasi Vo Rakshasi Vo, Subramaniam For Sale and her first Tamil film Natpathigaram 79.

Post her first stint in Big Boss in 2018, she decided to settle down and get married. She stated that he wanted her to make some changes and listen to his parents. After trying for while, she feared she would be losing her identity and called off the wedding

In 2022 she appeared in a television dance series BB Jodi on Star Maa.

== Filmography ==
- All works are in Telugu unless otherwise noted.

=== Film ===
Year	Title	Role	Notes
2012	Life Is Beautiful		Cameo appearance in the "Life Is Beautiful" song
2013	Seethamma Vakitlo Sirimalle Chettu	Geetha's younger sister	
2014	Manam	Divya	
2014	Heart Attack	Shriya	
2014	Ice Cream	Renu	Debut as a lead
2014	Lovers	Geetha	
2014	Anukshanam	Sathya	
2015	Malli Malli Idi Rani Roju	Mehek	
2015	Pandaga Chesko	Swathi	
2015	Kerintha	Priya	
2015	Subramanyam For Sale	Geetha	
2015	Srimanthudu	Venkata Ratnam's daughter	
2015	Jatha Kalise	Tejaswi	
2016	Natpadhigaram 79	Pooja	Tamil film
2016	Superstar Kidnap	Cameo appearance	
2016	Oorvasi Vo Rakshasi Vo		
2016	Krishnashtami	Honey	
2016	Wish You Happy Breakup	Nikki	
2016	Rojulu Marayi	Rambha	
2016	Naanna Nenu Naa Boyfriends	Maggie	
2017	Mister	Keerthi	
2017	Babu Baga Busy	Paru Menon	
2017	Balakrishnudu		
2022	Commitment		
2024	Hide N Seek		

=== Television ===
Year	Title	Role	Network	Notes
2016	Super 2	Contestant	ETV	Winner
2017	Mana Mugguri Love Story	Swathi	YuppTV	
2018	Bigg Boss 2	Contestant	Star Maa	Evicted on Day 42
2018	The Great Telugu Laughter Challenge	Host	Star Maa	Season 1
2022	Bigg Boss Non Stop 1	Contestant	Disney+ Hotstar	Evicted on Day 35
2023–present	Arthamainda Arun Kumar	Shalini	Aha	
2024	The Mystery Of Moksha Island	Nisha	Disney+ Hotstar	
2024	Reality Ranis of the Jungle	Contestant	Discovery Channel	4th place
2025	Kirrack Boys Khiladi Girls 2	Contestant	JioHotstar a.k.a. Disney+ Hotstar	
2026	The 50	Contestant	Colors TV/ Jio Hotstar	Eliminated 44th place

=== Music videos ===
Year	Title	Singer(s)	Ref.
2023	"Bhakti Bomb"	Chaitanya Kanhai	
