= Hunterrr =

2015 film directed by Harshavardhan Kulkarni

- Theatrical release poster
- Directed by: Harshavardhan Kulkarni
- Written by: Harshavardhan Kulkarni
- Produced by: Kirti Nakhwa; Rohit Chugani; Ketan Maru; Aishwarya Kaushik; Rahul Abhua; Vikas Bahl; Vikramaditya Motwane; Anurag Kashyap
- Starring: Gulshan Devaiah; Radhika Apte; Sai Tamhankar; Veera Saxena
- Cinematography: John Jacob Payyapalli
- Edited by: Kirti Nakhwa
- Music by: Songs: Khamosh Shah; Score: Hitesh Sonik
- Production companies: Tailormade Films; Phantom Films
- Distributed by: Shemaroo Entertainment; Falco International
- Release date: 20 March 2015
- Running time: 141 minutes
- Country: India
- Language: Hindi
- Budget: ₹3 crore
- Box office: ₹11.2 crore

Hunterrr is a 2015 Indian Hindi-language adult comedy film written and directed by Harshavardhan Kulkarni. The film stars Gulshan Devaiah, Radhika Apte and Sai Tamhankar. The film revolves around an unassuming sex addict and his lustful journey in life.

The film was released on 20 March 2015. The film was remade in Telugu as Babu Baga Busy (2017).

== Plot ==
Mandar is a playboy, who moves to Pune for college. His friends have mixed success with women. One of his cousins, Kshitij, brings home a new girl each week, while Dilip aka Yusuf has lesser luck. Mandar attracts Parul from one of the local colleges, and invites her to his dorm. They begin a relationship, but Mandar gets thrown out of the hostel for breaking the rules. He moves into an apartment complex, and immediately begins an affair with an older woman named Jyotsana. When her husband finds out. Mandar is forced out of his apartment due to embarrassment. He also loses Parul, as she decided to move on after his infidelity.

Years later, Mandar confesses to Yusuf he is tired of seeking casual encounters and wishes to settle down. He changes his approach to meeting women, but realises most girls seeking an arranged-marriage are not drawn to 'experienced' guys such as him. After being endlessly rejected for marriage, Mandar lies to Tripti, the next girl he meets off a matrimony website. He pretends he has never had a relationship with a girl before, out of an inordinate fear of rejection. Tripti finds this incompatible, as unlike other girls, she has been dating actively since high school.

Mandar persists in his efforts with Tripti, and she warms up to him. They bond emotionally over the unexpected loss of Kshitij while away on army service, and decide to get engaged. Still, Mandar does not have a physical relationship with Tripti, who has doubts about going though with the marriage. Mandar's previous partners seek him out for casual encounters, and he obliges. Mandar also recklessly tries to hook up with a girl at the airport, only to find out she is known to his family.

Unsure if his latest escapade will end his engagement with Tripti, Mandar comes clean with her. He tells her about his philandering past, leaving Tripti feeling relieved more than betrayed. Finding Mandar to be more compatible with her now, she wholeheartedly agrees to go ahead with the marriage, though she requests he conduct an STD test. Mandar is happy to finally let go of his endless string of hook-ups, and finally settling down in life with an understanding partner.

== Cast ==
- Gulshan Devaiah as Mandar Ponkshe, a philanderer
- Radhika Apte as Tripti Gokhale
- Sai Tamhankar as Jyotsna Surve
- Sagar Deshmukh as Dilip "Yusuf" Ponkshe
- Veera Saxena as Parul Kotak
- Rachel D'Souza as Shobha N. T.
- Vaibbhav Tatwawdi as Kshitij
- Suraj Jagan as Chakravarthy "Chaxx"
- Sandeep Dhabale as Mandar's friend
- Neena Kulkarni as Mandar's mother
- Ravindra Mankani as Mandar's father
- Pratibha Date as Tripti's mother
- Dilip Vengurlekar as Tripti's father
- Nitesh Pandey as Deepak Surve, Jyotsna's husband
- Hansa Singh as Savitha Sahay
- Subhadip Raha as the policeman

== Production ==
The entire filming was done in Mumbai, Pune and some rural parts of Maharashtra.

== Music ==
Hunterrr

Soundtrack album by Khamosh Shah
- Released: 11 February 2015
- Genre: Feature film soundtrack
- Length: 32:04
- Language: Hindi
- Label: Zee Music Company
External audio
- Audio Jukebox on YouTube

The soundtrack of Hunterrr consists of seven songs composed by Khamosh Shah while the lyrics have been written by Vijay Maurya, Azazul Haque and Swanand Kirkire.

Tracklist
No.	Title	Lyrics	Singer(s)	Length
1.	"Hunterrr 303"	Vijay Maurya	Bappi Lahiri	3:59
2.	"Chori Chori"	Khamosh Shah	Arijit Singh, Sona Mohapatra	4:03
3.	"Thaali Hai Khaali"	Azazul Haque	Nakash Aziz	3:51
4.	"Naina"	Azazul Haque	Khamosh Shah	5:39
5.	"Bachpan"	Swanand Kirkire	Amit Trivedi	5:11
6.	"Ye Naa Gade"	Vijay Maurya	Anand Shinde, Vaishali Made	5:16
7.	"Dil Lagaana"	Khamosh Shah	Altaf Raja	4:05
Total length:				32:04

== Reception ==
=== Critical response ===
On review aggregator website Rotten Tomatoes the movie has an approval score of 67% on the basis of 6 reviews with an average rating of 5.7 out of 10. Rajeev Masand didn't like the portrayal of women in the film saying that the movie shows them as "desperate-for-marriage becharis, or unhappy frustrated housewives. The sexist stereotyping is one thing; more offensive is the fact that the women in the film are uniformly dumb." Rajeev gave the film a rating of 2 out of 5 and said that, "Too bad the film itself is promising but ultimately disappointing. A film, that in the end, delivers little else but cheap laughs." Shubhra Gupta of The Indian Express gave the film a rating of 2 out of 5 saying that, "‘Hunterr’ could have been a genuinely ‘adult’ comedy of manners, but it stays right where it begins, the phrase ‘coming-of-age’ functioning more as eliciting an embarrassed titter than reaching the goal-post." Meena Iyer of The Times of India gave the film a rating of 3 out of 5 and said that, "Investing a bit more on real emotions of the lead characters, instead of fast-forwarding to their baser instincts constantly, would have made the film more relatable." Faiza S Khan of The Guardian gave the film a rating of 3 out of 5 and said that, "This sex comedy's lead is creepy and cringeworthy, but at least the film manages to take a small step away from the genre's usual crass misogyny".

Raja Sen of Rediff gave the film a rating of 2 out of 5 and said that, "Hunterrr is a deeply problematic film, and fails rather miserably". Sudhish Kamath of The Hindu found the writing of the film to be weak and said that, "In its current form, this Hunterrr is more horny than trigger-happy. He just walks around with a gun and rarely fires – except once in the whole film." Saibal Chatterjee of Financial Express said that, "The film tends to ramble aimlessly after it has made its pivotal point: the path of juvenile carnality has more thorns than roses. It goes round in concentric circles as the hero creates a web of problems for himself". Shubha Sherry Saha of Mid-Day gave the film a rating of 2.5 out of 5 and said that, "There is a subtle difference between a pure, unbridled take on the 'taboo' topic of sex and a tacky one that tries too hard. Unfortunately, though Harshavardhan Kulkarni's 'Hunterrr' shows a lot of promise, it veers more towards the latter." Sweta Kausal of Hindustan Times gave the film a rating of 2 out of 5 and said that, "Hunterrr is not great, but director Harshvardhan Kulkarni, who has also written the script, has managed to churn out an interesting film that might become a stepping stone in this genre for Hindi cinema."
