= Sumanth Ashwin =

Indian Film actor

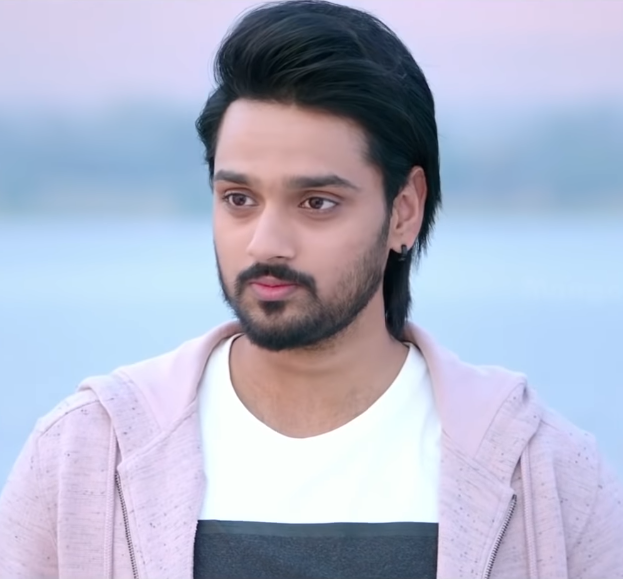
- Ashwin in 2018
- Occupation: Actor
- Years active: 2012–present
- Spouse: Deepika (m. 2021)
- Parent: M. S. Raju

Sumanth Ashwin is an Indian actor who appears in Telugu films. He is the son of film producer and director M. S. Raju. Ashwin made his debut in 2012 with Tuneega Tuneega, directed by his father, for which he won CineMAA Awards Best Male Debut.

Ashwin has also appeared in other films such as Anthaka Mundu Aa Tarvatha, Kerintha and Columbus and Happy Wedding.

== Personal life ==
Ashwin married Deepika, a research scientist by profession in 2021.

== Career ==
Ashwin worked as a co-producer for Pournami (2006) under his father's production. He made his acting debut in 2012 with Tuneega Tuneega under his father's direction. The film failed at the box-office. His second film, directed by Mohana Krishna Indraganti, was successful at the box-office and was nominated for Best Film at the International Indian Film festival in South Africa. Sumanth Ashwin got his first commercial break with the film Lovers. The film was co-produced by Director Maruthi. His fourth film Chakkiligintha was directed by one of director Sukumar's associates, Vema Reddy. MS Raju had planned to remake this film in Kannada with Sumanth Ashwin and himself playing the lead again, but the remake rights of the film for Kannada had been sold before the film's Telugu release.

Ashwin's 2015 film Kerintha is a romantic entertainer in which he played a role of college-goer; the film was directed by Sai Kiran Adivi and produced by Dil Raju under Sri Venkateswara Creations. Later that year. he also starred in Columbus directed by debutante R. Samala, featuring Seerat Kapoor and Mishti Chakraborty opposite him.

== Filmography ==
=== Films ===
Key
†	Denotes films that have not yet been released

Year	Title	Role	Notes	Ref.
2012	Tuneega Tuneega	Karthik Ramaswamy	CineMAA Award for Best Male Debut – Won	
2013	Anthaka Mundu Aa Tarvatha	Anil		
2014	Lovers	Siddu		
2014	Chakkiligintha	Aadi		
2015	Kerintha	Jai		
2015	Columbus	Ashwin		
2016	Right Right	Ravi		
2017	Fashion Designer S/O Ladies Tailor	Gopalam		
2018	Happy Wedding	Anand		
2019	Prema Katha Chitram 2	Sudheer		
2021	Idhe Maa Katha	Ajay		
2022	7 Days 6 Nights	Anand	Also producer	

=== Web series ===
Year	Title	Role	Notes	Ref.
2017	Endhukila	Dhanush Rishi	Web series debut; YuppTV	
