= Subhashni Giridhar =

Indian classical dancer (born 1965)

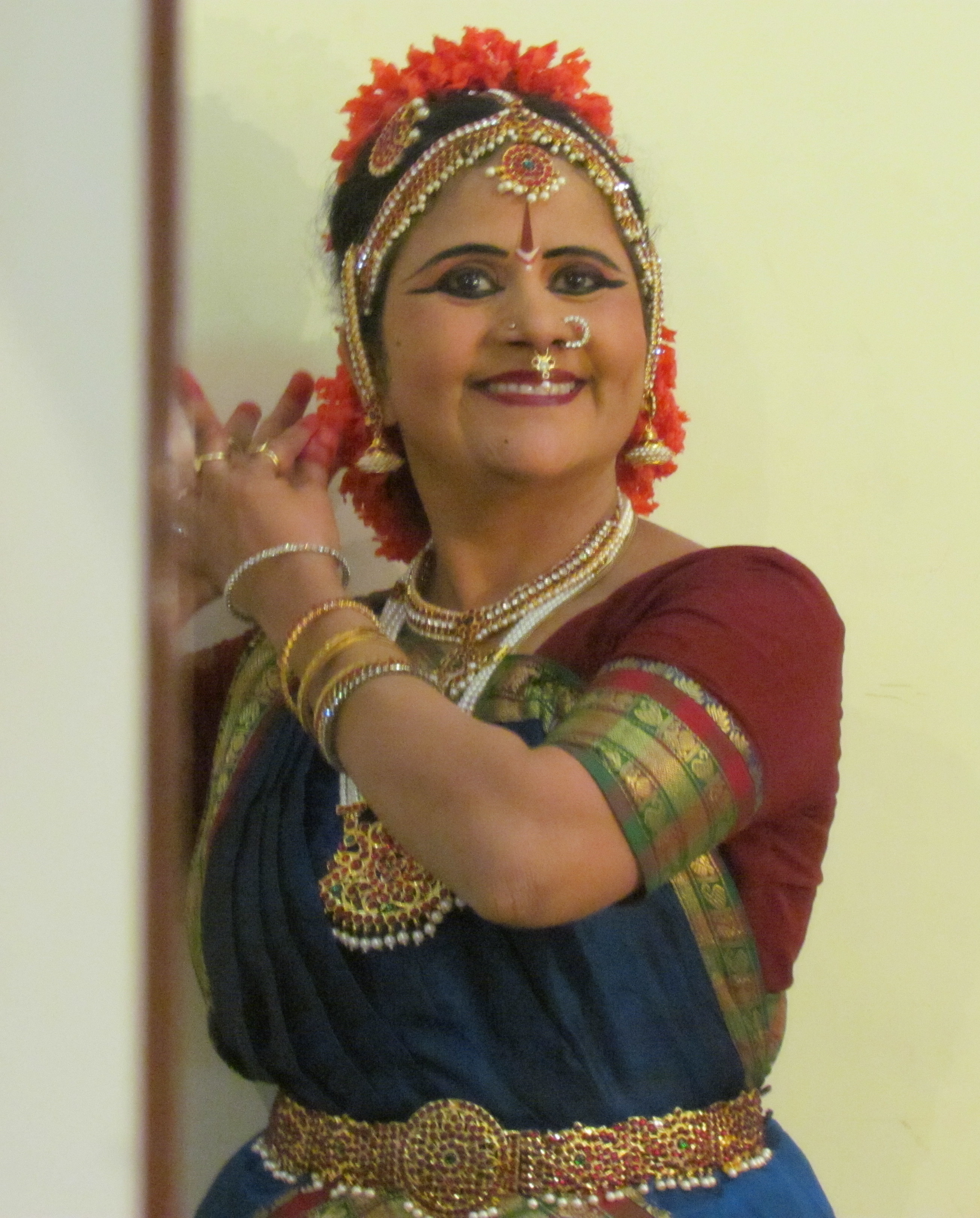
- CA Subhashni Giridhar
- Born: 27 April 1965 (age 61); Chennai, India
- Occupations: Indian classical dancer of Bharatanatyam and a Chartered Accountant
- Years active: 1990–present
- Spouse: Purisai Giridhar (1995–present)
- Children: 1
- Website: Subhashni.in

Subhashni Giridhar (born 27 April 1965) is an Indian classical dancer of Bharatanatyam and a Chartered Accountant.

== Early life and background ==
Subhashni Giridhar had the passion for dance since childhood and had trained in Thanjavur style of Bharata Natyam from the well known Gurus - ‘Kalaimamani’ late Guru A.T Govindaraj Pillai and later on from ‘Kalaimamani’ late Guru T.K. Mahalingam Pillai and Guru Vasant kumar of renowned Sri Rajarajeswari Bharatha Natya Kala Mandir, Matunga. Learning from the age of 8, she gave her first stage performance – ‘Arangetram’ on 26 January 1990.

== Dance career ==
After her ‘Arangetram’ in 1990, she has been giving several solo performance. Being a national level danseuse, her specialization is solo recitals. She has been giving solo performances since 1990 and has performed in several major sabhas / organizations such as Sri Shanmukhananda Sabha in Mumbai (1995) and New Delhi (2016), Ministry of Culture (India), Mulund Fine Arts Society, twice in NCPA in Little theatre and Godrej Dance Academy, four in ISKCON – monthly festival and Janmashtami Festival, Mulund Fine Arts Society, Cultural Festivals organized by Governments of Maharashtra, Tamil Nadu and Andhra Pradesh, ‘Vividha Kala Mahotsav’ organized by Department of Cultural Affairs, Govt of Maharashtra, ‘Pongal festival’ organized by Govt of Tamil Nadu at Taj Mahal Palace & Tower, and Centaur Hotel, festival under the aegis of Department of Tourism, Govt of Andhra Pradesh at Shilparamam, Regional conference of ICSI, SICA at Ravindra Bharathi, Hyderabad, dance festival of Kalasagaram, Secunderabad and Bombay Andhra Maha Sabha, Mumbai. In the year 2014, Subhashni completed 25 years as a dance exponent. She performed at the Potti Sreeramulu Telugu University to mark this occasion.

She also has set up a BharataNatyam Academy by the name - "Suguna Nrityalaya" in the memory of her late sister Smt Suguna, who mentored her to pursue BharataNatyam in the first place. The money from this academy would be forming the corpus of a Trust. The Trust money would be for imparting education to the underprivileged.

== Academic career ==
She is a post graduate in commerce from R.A.Podar College of Commerce, and also a Chartered Accountant. She became a FCA – fellow member of Institute of Chartered Accountants of India from 2003. In 2004, she acquired a post qualification degree DISA – Diploma in Information and Systems Audit from the Institute of Chartered Accountants of India. She has been conferred the title of ‘SHRINGAR MANI’ and adjudged as best dancer all over India, by SUR SINGAR SAMSAD. She has been pursuing her academic career with equal dedication and is a practising Chartered Accountant in Mumbai.

== Choreographies ==
Subhashni has choreographed many of her Dance Recitals

- She choreographed special dance theme "Shri Krishna Kaarunya" and performed it at Sri Janmashtami Festival at ISKCON, Kharghar, Navi Mumbai and "Shri Krishna Vaibhav" performed at ISKCON, Juhu, Mumbai.
- Her recent concept which she gave shape to was ‘Navarasas in the life of a student till he / she becomes a Professional / CA’. The concept, choreography and the performance was appreciated by the audience.

"First time in the history of Institute of Chartered Accountants of India, CA motto and history of CA emblem was shown by me in Abhinaya and Mudras with English subtitles, on CA Foundation day on 1 July 2011."

== Philosophy ==
The reason God made her to pursue her career and her passion (Bharathanatyam), both with the same zeal and enthusiasm was because God had chosen CA to fulfill the financial needs and Dance for her inner Bliss, she says. The Supreme satisfaction of the inner self while performing dance is unexplainable. The main reason that She has never made Dance a source of income after being a performer for more than two decades is that, she has always considered Bharathnatyam Dance as eternal and spiritual. When one could get so much of immense self-satisfaction and pure happiness then what else one could ask for from Dance? Materialistic thing like money? She has dedicated herself to Bharathanatyam. She believes in continuing her art all through her life and train as many dancers as possible who will carry on this legacy in to the future generations, without making it a commercial proposition. She says "If Every dance Performance of mine can motivate at least one person to pursue this rich Indian art of Bharata Natyam that would be my humble contribution to the field of art."
