= Giridhar Madras =

Indian chemical engineer and professor

- Born: 27 September 1967 (age 58); Salem, Tamil Nadu
- Scientific career
- Fields: Chemistry

Giridhar Madras is an Indian chemical engineer. He is currently a senior professor in the department of chemical engineering at the Indian institute of technology Hyderabad. He was a professor at the Indian Institute of Science. He is a recipient of the Swarna Jayanti Fellowship, J C Bose National Fellowship and the Shanti Swarup Bhatnagar Prize. He has published more than 550 journal articles, fetching more than 25,000 citations with an h-index of 80. This makes him one of the most cited scientists working in an engineering field in India. He has graduated over 100 students, including 50 Ph.D. students. He also writes a blog about life at IISc.

After a sexual harassment complaint filed by a doctoral student advised by him and subsequent investigation by IISc's internal complaints committee that confirmed the allegation to be true, the IISc governing council asked him to seek "compulsory retirement" in October 2018. At first, Honourable Justice Devdas of Karnataka high court has stayed the compulsory retirement of Prof. Giridhar Madras on 7 January 2019, stating several legal violations were made by ICC in the investigation process.The court concurred with Prof Madras that the IISc failed to give him a show-cause notice before forcing him into retirement. Further, the woman had been satisfied with the professor's response to her first complaint which was eventually closed. Subsequently, on 6 August 2019, Honourable Justice B.P. Bajanthri of Karnataka high court absolved Professor Madras of any wrongdoing in the aforementioned case, and directed IISc to take action against the Director and the ICC "for violating the rule prohibiting disclosure of the contents of a complaint of sexual harassment and inquiry proceedings. "

The institute filed an appeal against the above decision. The appeal was disposed following a settlement reached between IISc and Professor Giridhar Madras. The terms of this settlement are confidential. Giridhar Madras left the institute taking voluntary retirement on the day of infamy, December 7 (Case WA 3681/2019).

A detailed profile of the eminent scientist has been published as a research article here
