= Hero (2022 Indian film) =

2022 Indian Telugu-language action comedy film

- Theatrical release poster
- Directed by: Sriram Adittya
- Written by: Sriram Adittya
- Produced by: Padmavathi Galla
- Starring: Ashok Galla; Nidhhi Agerwal
- Cinematography: Sameer Reddy; Richard Prasad
- Edited by: Prawin Pudi
- Music by: Ghibran
- Production company: Amara Raja Media and Entertainment
- Release date: 15 January 2022
- Running time: 132 minutes
- Country: India
- Language: Telugu
- Box office: ₹5.10 crore

Hero is a 2022 Indian Telugu-language action comedy film written and directed by Sriram Adittya. Produced by Amara Raja Media and Entertainment, the film stars debutant Ashok Galla and Nidhhi Agerwal while Jagapathi Babu, Naresh, Vennela Kishore, Brahmaji, and Satya play supporting roles with the music composed by Ghibran.

The film began its production in November 2019. Following the delays caused by the COVID-19 pandemic, Hero was theatrically released on 15 January 2022. The film received mixed reviews from the critics and audiences as well.

== Plot ==
Saleem Bhai Savyasachi is a crime boss in Mumbai who kills the police commissioner with an flintlock gun and sends the gun to Hyderabad to assassinate one of his enemies. Arjun is a struggling actor who orders a hair oil to treat his hair fall, but receives the gun in courier due to mistaken identity and discusses the problem with his friend at night on his terrace. A CI harasses a lone woman at night in their colony and Arjun's friend (who is drunk) couldn't understand the problem, where he accidentally shoots the CI while snatching the gun from Arjun. He tries to report the incident to the police but withdraws after realizing that he shot the CI. He tries to toss away the gun, but fails to do so.

Meanwhile, the hitman who is also named Arjun, receives the hair oil instead of the gun and investigates the matter. Arjun receives another parcel with the photo of Sripati, who is his girlfriend Subbu's father, and is ordered to kill him. Arjun (hitman) finds Arjun's home and holds him at gunpoint while Arjun's parents return from a film and find the gangsters in their house. Arjun convinces them that they are from the shooting crew. The gangsters leave with the courier, but Arjun changes the photo of their target. Sripati acts as he suffers from heart stroke in a bid to leave for US with a reluctant Subbu. The gangsters realize their mistake but decide to help Arjun. They inform him that Saleem Bhai hired another assassin to kill Sripati.

Arjun and his family along with Subbu's father leave for a temple shrine where after secretly defeating the goons, Arjun finds the assassin to be CI and saves Sripati from him. Subbu's mother then reveals to everyone that Sripati dreamt of becoming an actor and finally landed a lead role in Saleem Bhai's biopic. Sripati's car broke down on the first day of filming and he travelled with the police commissioner. The police commissioner attacked Saleem Bhai, who swore vengeance on Sripati. After narrating the events, Sripati then boards a train to Mumbai and Arjun tries to convince him to return. They later realize that it is a shooting spot and the train isn't going anywhere. Saleem Bhai attacks Arjun and Sripati at the railway station, but they defeat him. Impressed with their performance, the producer of the film offers them roles in his film where Arjun and Sripati finally become actors.

== Cast ==
- Ashok Galla as Arjun
- Nidhhi Agerwal as Subhadra "Subbu" Sripati
- Jagapathi Babu as Sripati, Subbu's father
- Kausalya as Subbu's mother
- Naresh as Arjun's father
- Archana Ananth as Sarada, Arjun's mother
- Vennela Kishore as Telemarketing guy
- Brahmaji as a film actor
- Satya as Arjun's friend
- Ravi Kishan as Saleem Bhai Savyasachi
- Mime Gopi as Arjuna, a goon
- Kota Srinivasa Rao as Arjuna's father
- Raghu Karumanchi as Arjuna's henchmen
- Srikanth Iyengar as Mumbai Police
- Ajay as Police CI
- Prabhakar as Police Officer
- Satyam Rajesh as Subbu's fiance
- Viva Harsha as a forest thief
- Chammak Chandra as a clinic worker
- K. Sivasankar as a dance master (posthumous)
- Anil Ravipudi in a cameo appearance as a film director

== Production ==
Hero marks the debut of Mahesh Babu's nephew Ashok Galla, the son of businessman and politician Galla Jayadev. Sriram Aditya (who earlier directed Bhale Manchi Roju, Samanthakamani and Devadas) was signed to helm the film while actress Nidhhi Agerwal was cast opposite Galla. It is produced by Padmavathi Galla under Amar Raja Media and Entertainment as their maiden venture. The film began its production in November 2019 in Hyderabad with an estimated budget of ₹3.5 crore. Galla's grandfather and veteran actor Krishna visited the film's sets and directed a scene on Aditya's request. Aditya described the film as "a romantic potboiler with a hidden twist towards the end."

The film began its post-production in June 2021, and the title was unveiled as Hero.

== Release ==
The film was initially scheduled to release on 26 January 2022, however, owing to the postponement of other major films like RRR, Hero's release date was advanced to 15 January 2022, coinciding with the festival of Sankranti. The film's digital rights were brought by Hotstar and premiered on February 11, 2022. The satellite rights were brought by Star Maa.

== Reception ==
The film received mixed reviews from critics praising the cast performances, visuals, humour and action sequences, but criticize the latter half and termed it as silly.

Neeshita Nyayapati of The Times of India, rated the film 3/5 and wrote, "Hero had the potential to be a film that keeps you on the edge of your seat while ensuring you leave the cinema hall having laughed your heart out." A Sakshi critic appreciated the direction, screenplay and performances, with a particular praise to the film's humour. A reviewer from Eenadu also echoed the same but felt that the latter half was too silly for a serious subject.
