= Eeswaran (soundtrack) =

Soundtrack album by Thaman S
- Released: 2 January 2021
- Recorded: 2020
- Genre: Feature film soundtrack
- Length: 14:43
- Language: Tamil
- Label: Think Music
- Producer: Thaman S

Thaman S chronology
Krack (2021)	Eeswaran (2021)	Wild Dog (2021)

Singles from Eeswaran
- 1. "Thamizhan Paattu" Released: 14 December 2020

Eeswaran is the soundtrack album to the 2021 film of the same name directed by Suseenthiran starring Silambarasan, Bharathiraja, Nidhhi Agerwal and Nandita Swetha. The musical score is composed by Thaman S and featured four songs with lyrics written by Yugabharathi. The album was preceded by the lead single "Thamizhan Paattu" which was released on 14 December 2020, and it was released under the Think Music label on 2 January 2021.

== Development ==
The music for the film is composed by Thaman S, in his third collaboration with Silambarasan after Osthe (2011) and Vaalu (2015); first with Suseenthiran. Yugabharathi served as the primary lyricist, writing four songs for the album. Silambarasan, Ananthu, Deepak Blue, Aravind Srinivas, Roshini, Ananthu, ML Gayatri and Thaman served vocals for the songs.

Thaman started working on the film's music in late-October 2020, soon after his involvement. In early November, he worked with the Chennai Strings Orchestra for recording the background score. By mid-December, Thaman completed working on the film's background score. He further attributed that he had completed all the composition and recording process within two months; the fastest film he scored after his Telugu film Businessman (2011).

== Release ==
Before the audio release, the first song "Thamizhan Paattu" was served as the film's lead single, which was released on 14 December 2020. The film's soundtrack was launched on 2 January 2021 at the Albert Theatre in Chennai.

== Track listing ==
All lyrics are written by Yugabharathi.

No.	Title	Singer(s)	Length
1.	"Thamizhan Paattu"	Ananthu, Deepak Blue, Thaman S	4:35
2.	"Eeswaran" (Title Track)	Thaman S, Deepak Blue, Aravind Srinivas	2:59
3.	"Mangalyam"	Silambarasan, Roshini	4:21
4.	"Velli Nilavae"	ML Gayatri	2:47

== Reception ==
Reviewing for the soundtrack album for Sify, music critic Siddharth Srinivas gave 3 out of 5, stating "Eeswaran is a nice and effective album from Thaman, who doesn't go long lengths but still makes it an adequately listenable experience on the whole." Karthik Srinivasan of Milliblog was critical of the film's music, saying "the tunes are way too familiar and the rhythm/beats/music too seems regurgitated" and added that "Velli Nilavae" was the only standout song from the album.

Logesh Balachandran of India Today wrote "S Thaman's background score has helped the audience connect with some of the emotional sequences in the film. Especially songs like Velli Nilavu and the Eeswaran title number add a lot of value to the script." In a negative review, Vishal Menon of Film Companion South wrote "Thaman's ear-blasting music makes it almost impossible to listen to the lines of the already auto-tuned singing, and reminds us further of the kind of early 2010s Simbu film that feels even older."

The song "Mangalyam" emerged as one of the popular Tamil songs in 2021, attributed to its virality in Instagram Reels and YouTube Shorts.
