= Posani =

Posani is a Telugu surname. Notable people with the surname include:

- Posani Krishna Murali (born 1958), Indian screenwriter, actor, director, and producer
- Sudheer Babu born as Posani Naga Sudheer Babu (born 1980), Indian actor and badminton player
