= Manamey =

2024 film by Sriram Adittya

- Theatrical release poster
- Directed by: Sriram Adittya
- Written by: Sriram Adittya
- Dialogues by: Arjun Carthyk; A. R. Tagore; Venkat D. Pati
- Produced by: T. G. Vishwa Prasad; Vivek Kuchibhotla
- Starring: Sharwanand; Krithi Shetty
- Cinematography: Vishnu Sarma; Gnana Shekar V. S.
- Edited by: Prawin Pudi
- Music by: Hesham Abdul Wahab
- Production companies: People Media Factory; Ramsey Studios Production
- Distributed by: Mythri Movie Makers
- Release date: 7 June 2024
- Country: India
- Language: Telugu
- Box office: ₹21.85 crore

Manamey (transl. Ourselves) is a 2024 Indian Telugu-language romantic comedy drama film written and directed by Sriram Adittya. It was produced by People Media Factory and Ramsey Studios Production. The film features Sharwanand and Krithi Shetty in the lead roles. The music was composed by Hesham Abdul Wahab.

The film released on 7 June 2024 to mixed reviews and grossed over ₹21.85 crore at the box office.

== Plot ==
Vikram is a happy-go-lucky youth who is doing his masters in the UK. One day, he gets a call from India that Anurag, his close friend and classmate from London, has died in a fire accident along with his wife. Vikram heads to India and is forced to become the caretaker of Anurag's son Kushi. The same happens with Subhadra, a close friend of Kushi's mother. The young couple becomes the guardians of the two-year-old in the UK and starts a new life. While Vikram is a very careless person, Subhadra adores Kushi. How this unique couple sheds their differences and take care of the young child is the basic story of the film.

== Cast ==
- Sharwanand as Vikram Balisetti, caretaker of Kushi
- Krithi Shetty as Subhadra, caretaker of Kushi
- Vikram Adittya as Kushi, son of Anurag and Shanti
- Tanikella Bharani as Mahendra, British Consulate Officer
- Vennela Kishore as Doctor
- Seerat Kapoor as Tanya, a tourguide
- Thrigun as Anurag, Vikram's best friend and Kushi's father who died in a fire accident
- Mounika Reddy as Shanti, Anurag’s wife and Kushi’s mother; Subhadra’s best friend who died in a fire accident
- Sachin Khedekar as Vikram's father
- Tulasi as Vikram's mother
- Mukesh Rishi as Shanti’s father and Kushi's grandfather
- Seetha as Shanti’s mother and Kushi's grandmother
- Ayesha Khan as Smitha
- Rahul Ravindran as Joseph, Anurag's business partner and rival
- Rahul Ramakrishna as Ramulu alias Rolex Ramulu Vikram's assistant
- Sudharshan as Vikram's friend
- Shiva Kandukuri as Karthik, Subhadra's fiance
- Devi Prasad as Subhadra’s father
- Pramodini Pammi as Subhadra’s mother
- Swapnika as Yamini, Subhadra’s friend
- Vijayakumar as Tony, a bypasser
- Zarina Wahab as Tony's wife

== Production ==
The film was initially announced with the tentative title #Sharwa35 on occasion of Sharwa's 39th birthday on 6 March 2023, but only received the official title, Manamey, on 6 March 2024. Approximately 80% of the film was shot in London, but some portions were also shot in Bangkok, Shankarpalle and Hyderabad. On occasion of Krithi's birthday on 21 September 2023, the team released a character look poster. Sharwanand reportedly finished his schedule in September. Principal photography was wrapped up on 24 October 2023. The film's title was officially released with a first look glimpse on 6 March 2024, while the teaser was unveiled on 19 April.

== Soundtrack ==
The soundtrack and background score were composed by Hesham Abdul Wahab in his maiden collaboration with Sriram and Sharwanand. The soundtrack was recorded at HW Studio in Kochi.

The first single titled, 'Ika Na Maate,' was released to the public on 28 March 2024, and expresses both the significance of being single and the character of the hero. The song also features various locations in England, including: St Mary Redcliffe in Bristol, Leadenhall Market in London and Shelter Hall in Brighton. The second single "Oh Manamey" was released on 25 May 2024, and showcases the pleasant moments between the hero and his love interest. The third single "Tappa Tappa," which was a wedding song, was released on 30 May 2024. The fourth single "Boom Boom" was released on 6 June 2024. The remaining singles were released as part of a jukebox on 8 June 2024. The film's soundtrack possesses sixteen songs in total.

Track listing
No.	Title	Lyrics	Singer(s)	Length
1.	"Ika Na Maate"	Krishna Chaitanya	Hesham Abdul Wahab	3:04
2.	"Oh Manamey"	Krishna Kanth	Karthik, Geetha Madhuri	3:56
3.	"Tappa Tappa"	Kasarla Shyam	Ram Miriyala, Hesham Abdul Wahab	3:46
4.	"Boom Boom"	Bhaskarabhatla	Hemachandra, Seerat Kapoor	4:03
5.	"Nee Sneham"	Bhaskarabhatla	Hesham Abdul Wahab	2:56
6.	"Johnny Johnny Yes Papa"	Lakshmi Priyanka	Vijay Prakash	3:15
7.	"Chinna Babu"	Lakshmi Priyanka	Roll Rida, Hesham Abdul Wahab	1:21
8.	"Oh Mahiya"	Lakshmi Priyanka	Harika Narayan, Hesham Abdul Wahab	3:32
9.	"Athiloka Komalangi"	Lakshmi Priyanka	Arvind Venugopal, Hesham Abdul Wahab	3:01
10.	"Sammohana"	Ramajogayya Sastry	Shweta Mohan, Hesham Abdul Wahab	3:35
11.	"Cheruvaina Neeve"	Ramajogayya Sastry	Hesham Abdul Wahab	5:24
12.	"World of Manamey"	Roll Rida, Hesham Abdul Wahab	Roll Rida, Sahithi Chaganti	1:24

== Release ==
=== Theatrical ===
Manamey was released in theatres on 7 June 2024.

=== Home media ===
The film began streaming on Amazon Prime Video from 7 March 2025.

10 April the film began streaming on Aha

== Reception ==
=== Critical response ===
Balakrishna Ganeshan of The News Minute gave 3.5/5 stars and wrote, "Amid the surge of violent action films that promote misogyny and sexism, Manamey offers a delightful package of no-judgement entertainment". The Times of India gave 3/5 stars and wrote, "In conclusion, Manamey is a delightful blend of romance and comedy, with a touch of emotional drama, making it a pleasant watch. Avad Mohammad of OTTplay gave 3/5 stars and wrote,"On the whole, Manamey is a feel-good romantic family drama that has some endearing moments in both halves".

Sangeetha Devi Dundoo of The Hindu wrote, "Hesham Abdul Wahab’s music is the lifeline of Manamey but on several occasions, the background score preempts every move and amplifies emotions without a pause. Occasional moments of silence wouldn’t have hurt. In any case, his melodies cannot make up for the lacklustre writing". Priyanka Sundar of Firstpost gave 2.5/5 stars and wrote, "It also left me wondering, why are we so reticent to explore the emotional aspect of plotlines such as this. Why do we only choose melodrama without emotional context?"

=== Box office ===
In the first three days, the film has collected a total gross of ₹8 crore in the home market (Andhra Pradesh and Telangana states of India). After ten days of the release, the total worldwide gross of the film is ₹17.80 crore.
