= Bhavya Creations =

Indian film production studio

- Industry: Entertainment
- Founded: 2007; 19 years ago
- Headquarters: Hyderabad, India
- Key people: Venigalla Ananda Prasad
- Products: Films
- Owner: Venigalla Ananda Prasad

Bhavya Creations is an Indian film production studio. It was launched in 2007 by V. Ananda Prasad.

== Films produced ==
Year	Film	Director	Notes
2008	Souryam	Siva	
2009	Amaravathi	Ravi Babu	
2011	Wanted	B.V.S.Ravi	
2012	Neeku Naaku Dash Dash	Teja	
2014	Loukyam	Sriwass	
2015	Soukhyam	A.S. Ravi Kumar Chowdary	
2017	Shamanthakamani	Sriram Adittya	
2017	Paisa Vasool	Puri Jagannadh	
2020	O Pitta Katha	Chendu Muddhu	
2020	Middle Class Melodies	Vinod Anantoju	Released on Amazon Prime Video
2021	Check	Chandra Sekhar Yeleti	
2023	Hunt	Mahesh Surapaneni	
2025	Drive	Jenuse Mohamed	
