= Maya Bazaar For Sale =

- Genre: Comedy; Drama
- Story by: Gautami Challagulla; Swetha Manchiraju; Haribabu Dasari
- Directed by: Gautami Challagulla
- Composer: Jerry Silvester Vincent
- Country of origin: India
- Original languages: Telugu; English
- No. of seasons: 1
- No. of episodes: 7

Production
- Executive producers: Sanjiv Chakravarthy; Pingle Pranav Reddy
- Producers: Rana Daggubati; Venkatesh Daggubati; Pranav Pingle Reddy; Rajeev Ranjan
- Cinematography: Naveen Yadav
- Editor: Ravi Teja Girijala
- Production companies: Spirit Media; Mirage Media

Original release
- Network: ZEE5
- Release: 14 July 2023

Maya Bazaar for Sale' is an Indian (Telugu language) Comedy (drama) [streaming in "Zee TV Telugu" channel] series directed by Gautami Challagulla and produced by [Venkatesh (actor)|Venkatesh Daggubaati] and [Rana Daggubati]. It features [Navdeep], [Naresh (actor)], [Eesha Rebba], [Meiyang Chang], and Ravi Varma in the lead roles. The series premiered on 14 July 2023, on ZEE5.

== Plot ==
The plot of Maya Bazaar for Sale revolves around a posh community in Hyderabad. The peaceful lives of residents are disrupted when the government announces that the entire community is constructed illegally. How they deal with the situation is what the story explores.

== Cast ==
- Navdeep as Youth High Star Abhijeet
- Eesha Rebba as Valli
- Vijay Krishna Naresh as Padmanabha Sastry alias "Pastry", Valli’s father
- Meiyang Chang as Sudeem Gogoi alias "Gurkha"
- Jhansi as Kusuma Kumari, Valli’s mother
- Ravi Varma as Gandhi
- Hari Teja as Saritha Gandhi, Gandhi’s wife
- Kota Srinivasa Rao
- Gautam Raju as Subbu, Valli’s uncle and Pastry’s brother
- Aditi Myakal as Vijji
- Raja Chembolu as Vaibhav
- Sunaina Badam as Sudha
- Harika Vedula as Priyanka, Vaibhav’s wife
- Bindu Chandramouli as Bully
- Sivannarayana Naripeddi as CCDA Commissioner
- Getup Srinu as Police Inspector
- Ram Prasad as Police officer
- Baby Vaibhavi as Chinnu
- Avanti Deepak as Pramila
- Baby Kritika as Young Valli
- Mirchi Kiran as Events Ramabrahmam
- Ravi Raj as Deepu, Vijji’s husband
- Tarun Ponugoti as Khush, Sudeem’s roommate

== Production ==
Maya Bazaar for Sale was announced by ZEE5 in September 2022. Shooting for the show started on 1 September 2022.

== Marketing ==
The trailer of the show was released on 4 July 2023.
