= Musskan Sethi =

Indian actress

- Born: Delhi
- Occupation: Actress
- Years active: 2017–present

Musskan Sethi is an Indian actress. She is best known for her movies like Paisa Vasool and Raagala 24 Gantallo.

== Early life and career ==
Sethi was born in Delhi. In 2017, She made her debut with the film Paisa Vasool. In 2019, she acted in the film Raagala 24 Gantallo and High-End Yaariyan.

== Filmography ==
Year	Title	Role	Language	Notes
2017	Paisa Vasool	Harika	Telugu	
2019	Raagala 24 Gantallo	Meghna	Telugu	
2019	High End Yaariyan	Mandy	Hindi	
2020	Sayonee		Hindi	
2021	Radhakrishna		Telugu	
2021	Maro Prasthanam		Telugu	

=== Web series ===
- Masaba Masaba
- Love Sleep Repeat

=== Music videos ===
- Nai Jaana by Tulsi Kumar and Sachet Tandon
- Karde Haan by Akhil
- Bewafai by Sachet Tandon
