= Darsakudu =

- Theatrical release poster
- Directed by: Jakka Hari Prasad
- Written by: Jakka Hari Prasad
- Produced by: BNCSP Vijaya Kumar; Thomas Reddy Aduri; Ravi Chandra Satti
- Starring: Ashok Bandreddi; Noel Sean; Eesha Rebba; Pujita Ponnada
- Cinematography: Praveen Anumolu
- Edited by: Naveen Nooli
- Music by: Sai Karthik
- Production company: Sukumar Writings
- Release date: 4 August 2017 (India)
- Running time: 135 Minutes
- Country: India
- Language: Telugu

Darsakudu (transl. Director) is a 2017 Indian Telugu-language film written and directed by Jakka Hari Prasad. The film features Ashok Bandreddi, Noel Sean, Eesha Rebba and Pujita Ponnada in the lead roles. The music was composed by Sai Karthik while cinematography was handled by Praveen Anumolu.

== Plot ==
The film begins with Mahesh (Ashok Bandreddi) reminiscing about his past while watching his directorial movie "Darsakudu" in his favorite theatre.

Mahesh, an aspiring director and short film maker, believes that direction is 80% management and 20% creativity. Passionate about film direction since childhood, he promises his father to become a renowned director. He eventually gets a chance to direct his first film with Rakesh (Noel San), an upcoming hero, and a star producer (Kedar Shanker), who agrees to the project on the condition that Mahesh will be replaced by his co-director if he fails to handle it properly. Although Mahesh has a perfect script, he lacks confidence in the love track.

Returning to the city from his hometown, Mahesh accidentally reunites with his childhood friend Namratha (Eesha Rebba), a fashion designer, on a train. He successfully woos her through comical circumstances, leading her to propose to him. However, Namratha soon realizes that Mahesh courted her only to enhance the love track in his script. She breaks up with him, accusing him of being a director who cannot understand genuine love.

As the movie progresses into production, Mahesh introduces himself as Anand at a press meet, further frustrating Namratha. She arrives on set to confront him, just as Mahesh becomes dissatisfied with the heroine's performance, who was recommended by his co-director. During the confrontation, Mahesh offers the heroine's role to Namratha's friend Sailu (Pujitha Ponnada), who happily accepts. Namratha, although uninterested in working with Mahesh, takes on the role of the fashion designer in the movie to seize a good opportunity in films. Observing the set, she realizes that Mahesh has copied their encounters for his scenes, which frustrates her further.

On her birthday, Namratha consumes alcohol for the first time and confesses her true feelings to Mahesh, accusing him of being a director who only cares about his films and not others' feelings. The next morning, the co-director visits Mahesh's house, misunderstands the situation, and complains to the producer. The producer, fearing delays, warns Mahesh to remove Namratha from the film. To focus on the project, Mahesh reluctantly complies, leading to another quarrel with Namratha. During a shoot, Namratha gets severely injured in an accident. Mahesh sends her to the hospital and continues shooting.

After completing the shoot, the producer demands an item song be added to the film, which Mahesh refuses. Angered, the producer removes Mahesh from the project and offers it to the co-director, who supports Mahesh and declines the offer.

Post-discharge, Namratha meets Mahesh's friend and the film's writer, who reveals that Mahesh genuinely loves her and depicted their romantic encounters in the film to express his feelings. Realizing his love, Namratha seeks out Mahesh but cannot find him. Meanwhile, "Darsakudu" receives positive reviews, though the director's name is not mentioned. The producer explains the decision to remove Mahesh's name from the credits.

Namratha convinces the producer to change the film's climax to help locate Mahesh. Through media reports, Mahesh learns about the revised climax and decides to watch the film in his favorite theater. The theater plays a video of Namratha requesting Mahesh to return as a director, declaring her love for him regardless of his feelings. Namratha then appears in front of him and proposes again. Observing a dialogue recorder in his pocket, she angrily hugs him, realizing he was capturing their moment for his creative inspiration.

== Cast ==
- Ashok Bandreddi as Mahesh
- Noel Sean as Rakesh
- Eesha Rebba as Namratha
- Pujita Ponnada as Sailu
- Sudharshan as Director's assistant

== Soundtrack ==
Darsakudu

Soundtrack album by Sai Karthik
- Released: 3 July 2017
- Recorded: 2017
- Genre: Soundtrack
- Length: 18:18
- Language: Telugu
- Label: Aditya Music
- Producer: Sai Karthik

Sai Karthik chronology
| Golisoda (2016) | Darsakudu (2017) | Raja the Great (2017) |

The soundtrack of the film was composed by Sai Karthik and released by Aditya Music.

Track list
| No. | Title | Lyrics | Artist(s) | Length |
|---|---|---|---|---|
| 1. | "Aakasam Dinchi" | Krishna Kanth | L. V. Revanth | 3:32 |
| 2. | "Sunday To Saturday" | Balaji | Lakshmi Sruthi | 3:15 |
| 3. | "Thokkalo Screenplay" | Balaji | Dhanunjay | 3:47 |
| 4. | "Nee Manasinthena" | Balaji | Dinker Kalvala, Saicharan Bhaskaruni | 3:38 |
| 5. | "Anaganaga Oka Raju" | Jakka Hari Prasad | Anurag Kulkarni | 3:03 |
| 6. | "Darsakudu (Theme Music)" (Instrumental) | | | 1:03 |
| Total length: | | | | 18:18 |

== Reception ==
The Times of India critic Neeshita Nyayapati rated the film 2.5 stars out of 5, and wrote: "‘Darsakudu’ seems like the soul of Namrata — a film that wants nothing to do with Tollywood, and yet does almost everything it can to fit in, simply because of its love for the industry." Y. Sunitha Chowdhary of The Hindu stated, "‘Darsakudu’ fails to utilise an interesting premise to its advantage." A reviewer from 123Telugu.com rated 2.75/5 and opined, "Darsakudu is a predictable love story which has nothing novel to offer."
