= Ami Thumi =

- Theatrical release poster
- Directed by: Mohana Krishna Indraganti
- Written by: Mohana Krishna Indraganti
- Produced by: K C Narasimha Rao
- Starring: Adivi Sesh; Eesha Rebba; Srinivas Avasarala; Aditi Myakal; Tanikella Bharani; Vennela Kishore
- Cinematography: P. G. Vinda
- Edited by: Marthand K. Venkatesh
- Music by: Mani Sharma
- Production company: A Green Tree Productions
- Release date: 9 June 2017
- Running time: 124 minutes
- Country: India
- Language: Telugu

Ami Thumi (transl. 'Fight it out') is a 2017 Indian Telugu-language romantic comedy film written and directed by Mohanakrishna Indraganti. It stars Adivi Sesh, Eesha Rebba, Srinivas Avasarala, Aditi Myakal, Tanikella Bharani and Vennela Kishore. The film was produced by K C Narasimha Rao, music composed by Mani Sharma, and cinematography by P. G. Vinda and edited by Marthand K. Venkatesh.

Ami Tumi is loosely based on Richard Brinsley Sheridan's comic opera The Duenna. There is another movie called Ananda Nilayam (1971) directed by B.S. Narayana which is also based on the same literature.

== Plot ==
Ami Thumi is a situation comedy about two couples in love: Maya (Aditi Myakal) and Vijay (Srinivas Avasarala) and his sister Deepika (Eesha Rebba) and Ananth (Adivi Sesh). Deepika's father Janardhan (Tanikella Bharani) objects to her relationship and is also a business rival of Maya's father. While Maya opts to become a nun, Janardhan arranges Deepika's marriage with another man, Sri Chilipi (Vennela Kishore); however, Deepika tricks Sri Chillipi into helping them. The movie follows his plans to help them change Janardhan's mind.

== Cast ==
- Adivi Sesh as Ananth
- Eesha Rebba as Deepika
- Srinivas Avasarala as Vijay
- Aditi Myakal as Maya
- Tanikella Bharani as Janardhan, Vijay and Deepika's father
- Vennela Kishore as Sri Chilipi
- Jogini Shyamala Devi as Kumari, Vijay and Deepika's maid
- Ananth Babu as Sarva Mangala Sastry "SMS"
- Madhumani as Maya's stepmother
- Kedar Shankar as Gangadhar, Maya's father
- Venu Gopal as Pedda Chilipi, Sri Chilipi's father
- Tanikella Bhargav as Kaashi
- Thadivelu

== Production ==
Ami Tumi was shot in just 31 days, with post-production taking 13 more days.

== Reception ==
Reviewing the film for Firstpost, Hemanth Kumar appreciated the humour and performances and wrote, "Ami Thumi is a screwball comedy, there’s plenty of confusion and plenty of chasing around, but more than anything, it has a tone which has long been missing in Telugu cinema." Karthik Keramalu of The News Minute, also echoed the same, calling it "screwball comedy at its finest." Keramalu praised Kishore in particular, adding "it’s Kishore who enjoys the largest share of the pie. He’ll win a great number of awards next year for his zany character, Sri Chilipi." The Hindu critic Sangeetha Devi Dundoo also called Kishore "the star of the film," stating that making Sri Chilipi the pivotal character in this drama is where the surprise lied in. Reviewing other performances, Suresh Kaviryani of Deccan Chronicle wrote: " Adivi Sesh and Avasarala are the lead actors, but Adivi Sesh gets far more exposure; Avasarala’s role is like a cameo. Eesha is good and her Telangana accent authentic. Thanikella Bharani gets another important role and does well, experienced actor that he is."

Ch Sushil Rao of The Times of India felt that the film fared average with loose dots of laughter. Rao was critical of the technical aspects, writing, "There’s nothing much to talk about the locales or cinematography since most of it is shot indoors adhering to the demands of the screenplay. The music too is average and usually seats in the backseat throughout the story. " A reviewer from Sify wrote: "Ami Thumi doesn't have much story line but does generate some laughs."

== Soundtrack ==
The music has been composed by Mani Sharma and released by Aditya Music.

Ami Thumi

Soundtrack album by Mani Sharma
- Released: 10 May 2017
- Recorded: 2017
- Genre: Soundtrack
- Length: 8:58
- Label: Aditya Music
- Producer: Mani Sharma

Mani Sharma chronology
Jayadev (2017)	Ami Thumi (2017)	Samanthakamani (2017)

Track list
No.	Title	Lyrics	Singer(s)	Length
1.	"Ayya Baaboi"	Sirivennela Seetharama Sastry	Pavan Charan, Sahithi Chaganti, Vennela Kishore, Tanikella Bhargav	3:33
2.	"Takadhimi"	Sirivennela Seetharama Sastry	Sweekar Agasthi, Ramya Behara	2:47
3.	"Takadhimi (Club Version)"	Sirivennela Seetharama Sastry	Sri Krishna	2:38
Total length:				8:58
