= Eesha Rebba =

Indian actress (born 1990)

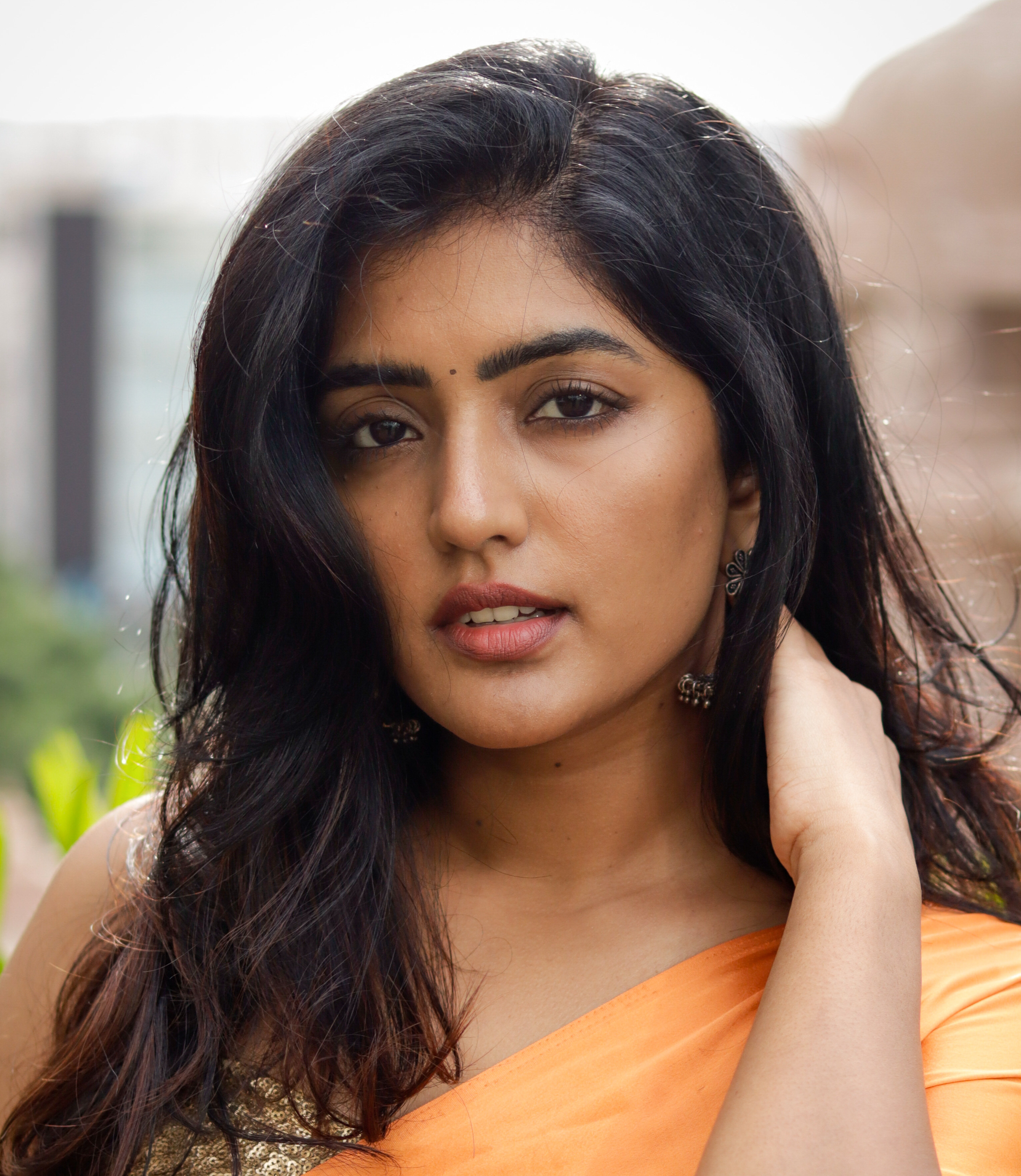
- Rebba in August 2022
- Born: 19 April 1990 (age 36); Warangal, Andhra Pradesh (present-day Telangana), India
- Occupation: Actress
- Years active: 2013–present

Eesha Rebba (born 19 April 1990) is an Indian actress who predominantly works in Telugu films. She is known for her roles in Anthaka Mundu Aa Tarvatha (2013), Bandipotu (2015), Ami Thumi (2017) and Awe (2018).

== Early life ==
Eesha Rebba was born in a Telugu family in Warangal, and was brought up in Hyderabad. She holds an MBA. Rebba worked as a model during college, after which she received an audition call from director Mohana Krishna Indraganti.

== Career ==
Rebba made her debut in 2012 with the film Life Is Beautiful, directed by Sekhar Kammula. She then made her first appearance in a lead role in the film Anthaka Mundu Aa Tarvatha. The film was successful at the box office and was nominated for Best Film at the International Indian Film festival in South Africa.

Her performance in the romantic-comedy film Ami Thumi received wide response and fetched her two awards. Rebba played a lesbian character in the film Awe (2018). Critics praised her performance in the film. Later the same year, she had four other films Brand Babu, Aravinda Sametha Veera Raghava, Subrahmanyapuram and Savyasachi. She made her Malayalam cinema debut in 2021 with the bilingual film Ottu. She learned archery and kickboxing for her role in the film.

== Filmography ==
Key
†	Denotes films that have not yet been released

=== Films ===
- All films in Telugu language, otherwise noted.

Year	Title	Role	Language	Notes	Ref.
2012	Life Is Beautiful	Harini	Telugu	Debut film	
2013	Anthaka Mundu Aa Tarvatha	Ananya	Telugu	Debut as lead actress	
2015	Bandipotu	Jahnavi	Telugu		
2016	Oyee	Swetha	Tamil	Tamil Debut; credited as Eesha	
2017	Ami Thumi	Deepika	Telugu		
2017	Maya Mall	Mytri	Telugu		
2017	Darsakudu	Namratha	Telugu		
2018	Awe	Radha	Telugu		
2018	Brand Babu	Radha	Telugu		
2018	Aravinda Sametha Veera Raghava	Sunandha	Telugu		
2018	Subrahmanyapuram	Priya	Telugu		
2018	Savyasachi	Stranger	Telugu	Cameo appearance	
2019	Raagala 24 Gantallo	Vidya	Telugu		
2021	Most Eligible Bachelor	Geethika	Telugu	Cameo appearance	
2022	Ottu	Kalyani	Malayalam	Malayalam debut; Bilingual film	
2022	Rendagam	Kalyani	Tamil	Malayalam debut; Bilingual film	
2022	Nitham Oru Vaanam	Real Mathivadani	Tamil	Cameo appearance	
2023	Mama Mascheendra	"Viral" Visalakshi	Telugu		
2026	Om Shanti Shanti Shantihi	Kondaveeti Prashanti	Telugu		

=== Television ===
Year	Title	Role(s)	Language(s)	Availability	Notes
2021	3 Roses	Rithika "Ritu"	Telugu	Aha	web debut
2021	Pitta Kathalu	Priyanka "Pinky"	Telugu	Netflix	under Segment "Pinky"
2023	Maya Bazaar For Sale	Valli Sastry	Telugu	ZEE5	
2023	Dayaa	Alivelu	Telugu	Disney+Hotstar	
2026	3 Roses	Rithika "Ritu"	Telugu	Aha	Season 2

== Awards and nominations ==
Year	Awards	Category	Film	Result
2017	Cinegoers Award 2017	Best Sensational Heroine	Ami Thumi & Darsakudu	Won
2018	16th Santosham Film Awards	Special Jury Award for Best Actress	Ami Thumi	Won
2018	Zee Telugu Apsara Awards	Telugu Ammayi Award	Ami Thumi	Won
