= Bhale Manchi Roju =

2015 Indian comedy film

- Theatrical release poster
- Directed by: Sriram Adittya
- Screenplay by: Sriram Adittya
- Story by: Sriram Adittya
- Produced by: Vijay Chilla Shashi Devireddy
- Starring: Sudheer Babu; Wamiqa; Dhanya Balakrishna; Saikumar
- Cinematography: Shamdat Sainudeen
- Edited by: M. R. Varma
- Music by: Sunny M. R.
- Production company: 70mm Entertainments
- Release date: 25 December 2015
- Running time: 135 minutes
- Country: India
- Language: Telugu

Bhale Manchi Roju (transl. What a good day) is a 2015 Indian Telugu-language crime comedy film directed by Sriram Adittya and produced by Vijay Kumar Reddy and Shashidhar Reddy through 70mm Entertainments. The film stars Sudheer Babu, Wamiqa, Dhanya Balakrishna, and Saikumar. The film's music was composed by Sunny M.R. while Shamdat performed the cinematography with editing by M. R. Verma. The film was released on 25 December 2015.

== Plot ==
A man is compelled to kidnap a young woman to save his friends and family. Ram, who has fallen in love, wants to take revenge on his former girlfriend Maya by disrupting her wedding. Sita's wedding is cancelled when the groom elopes with another woman. Sakthi kidnaps Sita and takes her in his car but Ram crashes his car into Sakthi's vehicle. Sita escapes from Sakthi. Sakthi keeps Adi, Ram's friend, hostage and wants Ram to trace Sita.

== Cast ==
- Sudheer Babu as Ram
- Wamiqa Gabbi as Sita
- Dhanya Balakrishna as Maya D'Souza
- Saikumar as Shakti
- Posani Krishna Murali as Father Paul
- Paruchuri Gopala Krishna as Manikyam
- Vidyullekha Raman as Deepti
- Praveen as Aadi
- Venu Yeldandi as Eesu
- Sriram Eragamreddy as Albert
- Chaitanya Krishna as Surya
- Prudhviraj as Mallepushpam Ramarao
- Rajya Lakshmi
- Narra Srinivas

== Production ==
In January 2015, Sudheer Babu announced that his next film, after Krishnamma Kalipindi Iddarini, would be produced by Vijay and Shashi. The production took place under the 70mm Entertainments banner. The film was directed by debutant Sriram Adittya. He also mentioned in the announcement that he liked the script narrated by the director who immediately agreed to the job. In February 2015 Shamdat Seinhudeen, of Uttama Villain and Vishwaroopam 2, was announced as the cinematographer, Sunny M.R. as music director and Ramakrishna S as production designer. The formal Puja happened on 7 March 2015 in the 70mm Entertainments office. The official shoot commenced on 11 March 2015 at the citizens' hospital, where some important scenes were filmed. The shoot continued in locations of Hyderabad.

In April 2015, a marriage song was choreographed by Suchitra Chandrabose and a few scenes were filmed on a grand set at the Maryada Ramanna house. Regular filming continued from May to July, which resulted in 70% of the filming being completed. The first screening of the movie was organized on the birthday of Mahesh Babu on 7 August. Senior actor Saikumar joined the cast and reportedly played a very important role in the movie, which would result in a complete change of character in his career. Filming was completed in September by completing a romantic song choreographed by Chinni Prakash. A grand set was made for this song at Ramakrishna Studios by production designer Ramakrishna. The film's official teaser was launched on 6 November 2015 at the Prasad Film Labs and gained a very positive response from the media and the public. The soundtrack of the movie was launched by Mahesh Babu on 25 November at a grand event at Shilpakala Vedika.

The movie was released on 25 December 2015 amidst competition from several other big hits in the same year, but it stood as the front-runner due to positive reviews from critics and viewers. The movie remained the last hit movie of 2015 charts. The film was dubbed in Hindi as Kasam Uparwale Ki.

== Soundtrack ==
The music was composed by Sunny M.R. and released by Aditya Music.

Bhale Manchi Roju

Soundtrack album by Sunny M.R.
- Released: 25 November 2015
- Recorded: 2015
- Genre: Soundtrack
- Length: 27:13
- Label: Aditya Music
- Producer: Sunny M.R.

Sunny M.R. chronology
Dohchay (2015)	Bhale Manchi Roju (2015)	Keshava (2017)

Track list
No.	Title	Lyrics	Singer(s)	Length
1.	"Bhale Manchi Roju"	Krishna Kanth	Sunny M.R.	3:34
2.	"Ningi Needera"	Krishna Kanth	Arijit Singh	4:27
3.	"Mila Mila"	Krishna Kanth	Shashwat Singh	4:09
4.	"Chalthi Ka Naam Gaadi"	Krishna Chaitanya	Shashwat Singh	3:52
5.	"Evari Roopo"	Krishna Kanth	Arijit Singh	3:52
6.	"Vareva Ore Maccha"	Krishna Kanth	Amitabh Bhattacharya, Anthony Daasan, Shanthini Sathiyanathan	3:49
7.	"Dol Dolre"	Dinesh Goud Kakkerla	Amit Trivedi	3:30
Total length:				27:13

== Reception ==
=== Critical reception ===
Haricharan of Bangalore Mirror gave the film 4/5 stars and wrote, "The film, which could be easily described as a crime comedy, offers more than just entertainment [...] Bhale Manchi Roju ends the year for Telugu cinema with a bang. It may have been last release of 2015 but this is, hands down, the best film of the year." Pranita Jonnalagedda of The Times of India gave it 3.5/5 stars and wrote, "Fresh yet intelligent, simple yet appealing, here’s a film which gives you what you are in search of – entertainment, and that too without trying too hard."

Jeevi of Idlebrain.com rated the film 3/5 and wrote, "Plus points of the film are story, screenplay and technicians. On the flip side, the narrative style and orientation (dark narrative, over-indulgence in slow motion technique, overbearing background music etc) mars the experience." A critic from Sakshi gave the film a positive review, noting that the plus points of the film are the lead actors and the comedy, while the negative aspects are the slow narration and the songs.

=== Box office ===
Despite releasing alongside Soukhyam, Mama Manchu Alludu Kanchu and Jatha Kalise, Bhale Manchi Roju grossed over ₹12 crore in its opening weekend and minted a distributor's share of ₹7.50 crore, beating out its competition.
