= Subrahmanyapuram =

2018 Indian Telugu-language film

- Film poster
- Directed by: Santhossh Jagarlapudi
- Written by: Santhossh Jagarlapudi
- Produced by: Beeram Sudhakara Reddy; Dheeraj Boggaram
- Starring: Sumanth; Eesha Rebba
- Narrated by: Rana Daggubati
- Cinematography: Prathap R Krishnaa
- Edited by: Karthika Srinivas
- Music by: Shekar Chandra
- Production companies: Sudhakar Impex IPL; Taurus Cinecorp
- Release date: 7 December 2018
- Country: India
- Language: Telugu

Subrahmanyapuram is a 2018 Indian Telugu-language mystery thriller film starring Sumanth and Eesha Rebba directed by Santosh and produced by Sudhakara Reddy and Dheeraj. This film is spiritual sequel to the film Karthikeya starring Nikhil Siddharth.

== Plot ==
This entire film revolves around a young lad Karthiik (Sumanth), who is meant to solve the mystery of a town named Subrahmanyapuram.

== Cast ==
- Sumanth as Karthik
- Eesha Rebba as Priya
- Sai Kumar as Ayushmaan
- Suresh as Varma
- Surya
- Raghunatha Reddy
- Amit Sharma
- Vajja Venkata Giridhar
- Bhadram
- Josh Ravi
- Harishini
- Anishram S as Srinivas

== Production ==
The director narrated the script to Sumanth in February 2018. Sumanth plays an atheist in the film. This film is Sumanth's 25th film and was launched in March 2018 during the festival of Ugadi. The film was shot in Sriramapuram in East Godavari and Hyderabad. The first look of the film was revealed in July 2018. In August of the same year, around fifty percent of the shooting was completed. Rana Daggubati gave a voice-over for some scenes in the film. The shooting of the film finished in October 2018. The teaser was released during Dussehra in late October. The trailer was released in November. This film was released on 7 Dec 2018.

== Soundtrack ==
The songs were composed by Shekar Chandra.

- "Ee Rojila" is written by Suresh Banisetti and sung by Anurag Kulkarni and Nutana.
- "Friendship" is written by Puranachary and sung by Dhanunjay.
- "Saho Shanmukha" is written by Jonnavittula Ramalingeswara Rao and sung by S. P. Balasubrahmanyam.

== Reception ==
123Telugu gave three out of five stars and wrote that "The intriguing storyline is the main highlight of Subramanyapuram." The Hindu gave the film a mixed review and wrote "Subrahmanyapuram is definitely not what is depicted in the trailer". The Times of India gave the film two-and-a-half out of five stars and wrote that " If there’s something that you will not regret shelling out your hard-earned money for, it’s only Sumanth’s composed performance".
