= Sriram Adittya =

Indian screenwriter

- Born: Sriram Adittya Turlapati; Hyderabad, Telangana, India
- Occupation: Director
- Years active: 2015–present

Sriram Adittya is an Indian film director and screenwriter who works primarily in Telugu films. He made his directorial debut in 2015 with Bhale Manchi Roju (2015).

== Filmography ==
Year	Title	Director	Writer	Notes
2015	Bhale Manchi Roju	Yes	Yes	Directorial debut
2017	Shamantakamani	Yes	No	
2018	Devadas	Yes	Yes	
2022	Hero	Yes	Yes	
2024	Manamey	Yes	Yes	
