= Raagala 24 Gantallo =

- Theatrical release poster
- Directed by: Srinivasa Reddy
- Written by: Bayyavarapu Ravi; Krishna Bhagavan (dialogues)
- Produced by: Srinivas Kanuru
- Starring: Satyadev; Eesha Rebba; Sriram; Ganesh Venkatraman; Musskan Sethi
- Cinematography: Anji
- Edited by: Tammiraju
- Music by: Raghu Kunche
- Production companies: Sri Navahas Creations; Sri Karthikeya Celluloids
- Release date: 22 November 2019
- Country: India
- Language: Telugu

Raagala 24 Gantallo (transl. In the next 24 hours) is a 2019 Indian Telugu-language mystery thriller film directed by Srinivasa Reddy starring Satyadev, Eesha Rebba, Sriram, Ganesh Venkatraman and Musskan Sethi. The music was composed by Raghu Kunche with cinematography by Anji and editing by Tammiraju. The film released on 22 November 2019.

The plot of the film is inspired by Agatha Christie's play The Unexpected Guest. The film was dubbed and released in Tamil as Varappogum 24 Manikkul.

== Plot ==
Three criminals - Vineeth, Puneeth, and Adyuth - serving a death sentence for murder and rape, are on the run. They enter the house of a married couple: Rahul, a well-known ad filmmaker, and Vidya. Much to their shock, the criminals find that Vidya murdered Rahul and is trying to hide her husband's death.

She starts telling the criminals her story. Rahul was a perverted husband who suspected that Vidya had an affair with Ganesh, an IAS officer and her college friend. Later, unknowingly to her, Rahul secretly operates and removes her uterus because he does not like kids and pressures her to act in his ads. That is why she killed him to free herself. Meanwhile, cops who are searching for the criminals try to nab them, but Vidya tactically saves them.

Seeing the criminals' gentle nature, Vidya believes they are innocent and asks why they are on the run. The criminals narrate their story. They stay with Meghana, a struggling model, and all are equally affectionate with each other. One day, Meghana got an audition call from Rahul's office for an ad film. Meghana happily attends the audition and comes along with them. There, Rahul reveals it was a nude photoshoot for a condom ad, and Meghana refuses to work in the film. Rahul pressures her to do the film, which leads to a sexual assault, almost killing her on the spot. Rahul then calls his friend Narasimha, a corrupt policeman. Then, observing the situation, the criminals attack Rahul, but he manages to defeat them. Narasimha comes on time, frames the criminals for Meghana's murder and assault, and clears Rahul of the crime. Then, Meghana becomes conscious, and Rahul fears for the circumstances. Narasimha kills Meghana to make a perfect crime. Later, the court sentences the criminals to death, but they escape from the cops and decide to kill the duo responsible for Meghana's death.

After hearing the criminals' story, Vidya decided to help them kill Narasimha. The film ends at Narasimha's home with a hard struggle; the four kill Narasimha and successfully escape.

== Cast ==
- Satyadev as Rahul
- Eesha Rebba as Vidya
- Sriram as Narasimha
- Ganesh Venkatraman as Ganesh IAS
- Musskan Sethi as Meghana
- Srinivas Kanuru
- Temper Vamsi
- Anuraag Rajput
- Ajay Kumar Kathurvar
- Krishna Bhagavan as Abbas Paul
- Ravi Prakash as Ranjith Kumar
- Ravi Varma as Rahul's assistant
- Abhinaya Krishna as Abhinay, Ganesh's friend
- Manik Reddy as Constable
- Devipriya as gynecologist Doctor

== Production ==
After making several comedic films, director Srinivasa Reddy debuted in the thriller genre with this film. Sriram accepted to star in the film after listening to the film's script. Raghu Kunche was brought in to compose the music for the film. A motion poster was released in early September while a teaser was released at the end of September. The trailer released in November.

== Soundtrack ==
Raghu Kunche composed the film's score. The song "Narayanthe Namo Namo" was released by Y. V. Subba Reddy. Raghu Babu and Ali took part in the audio launch function. Devi Sri Prasad released the promotional song "Rebba". The second single, "Namo Namo", was released in October.

No.	Title	Lyrics	Singer(s)	Length
1.	"Rebba"	Sri Mani	Raghu Kunche	4:40
2.	"Nee Chiru Navvuki Namo (Namo Namo)"	Sri Mani	Haricharan, Ramya Shree Kamaraju	4:21
3.	"Aakasanne"	Bhaskarabhatla Ravi Kumar	Naresh Iyer, Musskan Sethi	4:23
4.	"Nee Chiru Navvuki"	Bhaskarabhatla Ravi Kumar	Ramya Sree Kamaraju	4:28
Total length:				17:52

== Release ==
The Times of India gave the film a rating of two-and-a-half out of five stars and wrote that "Raagala 24 Gantallo is a classic case of a good script faltering in its execution. Unfortunately, this thriller leaves us with more questions than answers". The Hindu wrote that "Ragala 24 Gantallo as the title suggests, is an ominous warning to viewers who walk in to see the movie".
