= Paisa Vasool (2017 film) =

2017 Indian film by Puri Jagannadh

- Theatrical release poster
- Directed by: Puri Jagannadh
- Written by: Puri Jagannadh
- Produced by: V. Anand Prasad; Charmy Kaur
- Starring: Nandamuri Balakrishna; Shriya Saran; Musskan Sethi; Vikramjeet Virk
- Cinematography: Mukesh Gnanesh
- Edited by: Junaid Siddiqui
- Music by: Anup Rubens
- Production companies: Bhavya Creations; Puri Connects
- Distributed by: Reliance Entertainment
- Release date: 1 September 2017 (India)
- Running time: 142 minutes
- Country: India
- Language: Telugu
- Budget: ₹28 crore
- Box office: est. ₹36 crore

Paisa Vasool (transl. Worth the money/Bang for the buck) is a 2017 Indian Telugu-language action comedy film, produced by V. Anand Prasad under Bhavya Creations banner and directed by Puri Jagannadh. It stars Nandamuri Balakrishna, Shriya Saran, Musskan Sethi and Vikramjeet Virk. The music was composed by Anup Rubens. The film marks Nandamuri Balakrishna's 101st film on the big screen, and he has for the first time singing a special song in this film with his own voice. The film received an average response from critics and grossed ₹36 crores against a production budget of ₹28 crores.

== Cast ==
- Nandamuri Balakrishna as Theda Singh / RAW Agent 'Bala'
- Shriya Saran as Sarika
- Musskan Sethi as Harika
- Vikramjeet Virk as Bob Marley
- Kyra Dutt as ACP Kiranmayi
- Kabir Bedi as Raw Chief
- Ali as Theda Singh's friend
- Pavitra Lokesh as Sarika and Harika's mother
- Prudhviraj as Advocate Pruthviraj
- Amit Tiwari as Sunny
- Srikanth Iyyengar as Minister
- Mukhtar Khan as Police Officer
- Alok Jain as Pathan
- Temper Vamsi as Bob Marley's henchman

== Soundtrack ==
Paisa Vasool

Soundtrack album by Anup Rubens
- Released: 17 August 2017
- Recorded: 2017
- Genre: Soundtrack
- Length: 21:42
- Label: Aditya Music
- Producer: Anup Rubens

Anup Rubens chronology
Nene Raju Nene Mantri (2017)	Paisa Vasool (2017)	Hello (2017)

Music composed by Anup Rubens. Music released by ADITYA Music Company.

No.	Title	Lyrics	Singer(s)	Length
1.	"Paisa Vasool"	Bhaskarabhatla	Daler Mehndi, Uma Neha, Anurag Kulkarni	3:58
2.	"Kannu Kannu Kalisai"	Bhaskarabhatla	Anoop Rubens, Jithin Raj, Sree Kavya Chandana	4:18
3.	"Mama Ek Peg La"	Bhaskarabhatla	Nandamuri Balakrishna, Divya Divakar	3:35
4.	"Kanti Chuppu Chebutondi (Remix)"	Aarudhra	Mano	3:11
5.	"Padhamari"	Pulagam Chinnarayana	Mano, Geetha Madhuri	4:32
6.	"Theda Singh (Theme Song)"	Instrumental	Music Bit	2:00
Total length:				18:31

== Production ==
In February 2017, director Puri Jagannath announced on Twitter that he would be directing Nandamuri Balakrishna's 101st film in his next directorial venture to be bankrolled by Bhavya Creations. The muhurtham shot took place on 9 March 2017 in Hyderabad amidst much fanfare. S. S. Rajamouli, Boyapati Srinu, Krish and other dignitaries attended the muhurat ceremony. While Rajamouli gave the clap, Boyapati directed the first shot. The first look of the movie along with the title was launched on 9 June 2017 on the eve of Balakrishna's birthday. On 27 August 2017, as a part of the film promotion Puri Jagannadh released a track called "Jai Balayya" composed by Sandeep Chowta and sung by Sujay Harthi. N.T.Rama Rao's old song "Kanti Choopu Cheptondi" from the movie Jeevitha Chakram was remixed in the film.

== Reception ==
=== Critical response ===
Siddhartha of Mirchi9 wrote about the movie "Paisa Vasool is a very ordinary movie story wise. The film looks like a combination of past Puri Jagannadh films with best bits taken from each of them." He also added that "Overall, the movie is just an average fare if one is a fan of the star (Balakrishna), for others, it is nothing unmissable."
