= Hunt (2023 film) =

2023 Indian Telugu film by Mahesh Surapaneni

- Theatrical release poster
- Directed by: Mahesh Surapaneni
- Written by: Mahesh Surapaneni
- Based on: Mumbai Police by Rosshan Andrrews
- Produced by: V. Ananda Prasad
- Starring: Sudheer Babu; Srikanth; Bharath
- Cinematography: Arul Vincent
- Edited by: Prawin Pudi
- Music by: Ghibran
- Production company: Bhavya Creations
- Release date: 26 January 2023
- Running time: 129 minutes
- Country: India
- Language: Telugu
- Budget: ₹14 crore
- Box office: est. ₹1.93 crore

Hunt is a 2023 Indian Telugu-language action thriller film directed by Mahesh Surapaneni. It stars Sudheer Babu, Srikanth, and Bharath. Produced by B. Madhu under Bhavya Creations Division banner, it is based on multiple true incidents that took place in the states of Andhra Pradesh and Telangana. The film features music scored by Ghibran, with cinematography by Arul Vincent, and editing by Praveen Pudi.

It is a remake of the 2013 Malayalam film Mumbai Police. The film received mixed reviews from critics, and was a box office bomb.

== Plot ==
P. Arjun Prasad is the ACP of Hyderabad, ends up in an accident which causes him partial memory loss. Prior to the accident, Arjun was having a conversation with Commissioner of Police Mohan Bhargav. He informs Mohan that he has solved the murder case of his best friend ACP Aryan Dev who was killed by a sniper during a gallantry awards ceremony at the police parade ground. Before he could disclose the name of the murderer, the accident occurs resulting in the partial memory loss. Arjun is attacked by assassins at his apartment after he is discharged, but he fights them off.

Mohan tells Arjun about their relationship with Aryan and the case investigation that Arjun has made. The trio were nicknamed as Mumbai Police due to their past in the Mumbai counter terrorism division. Due to Arjun's impressive capabilities as a cop, Mohan reassigns Arjun on the case despite the memory loss. Arjun has a hard time adjusting to his new life which starts affecting his profession. As the investigation continues, Arjun realises that he was a daredevil cop with an impressive record but was notorious for his use of violence, alcoholism and womanising.

Arjun finds that the sniper who was hired to assassinate Aryan was remote controlled. As his investigation proceeds, Arjun is asked to be removed from the case by his team members but Arjun asks for 2 days' time in order to solve the case and find the culprit. A man comes to Arjun's apartment and starts behaving oddly, which confuses Arjun and he beats him out of his apartment. Arjun realises that he is a closeted homosexual and breaks down in tears. Arjun confronts Mohan and asks him to reveal the full audio clip on his voicemail that he had sent before his accident.

Before the accident, Arjun met Aryan's fiancée Nivetha, who showed Aryan's awards speech rehearsal video in which he dedicated the award to Arjun. It is then revealed that Arjun himself was the one who killed Aryan since he found out about his homosexuality and felt he might oust Arjun. After seeing the video and breaking down, Arjun had confessed to his crimes to Mohan and asks him to arrest him. Mohan tells him that he can use his state of mind and get him out of this case but Arjun tells him that even if he is out, he will be living with the guilt that he killed Aryan.

== Cast ==
- Sudheer Babu as P. Arjun Prasad
- Srikanth as Mohan Bhargav
- Bharath as Aryan Dev
- Chitra Shukla as Nivetha
- Kabir Duhan Singh as Colonel Vikram Singh
- Mime Gopi as Roy
- Manjula Ghattamaneni as Dr. Alekhya
- Ravi Varma as Sharpshooting Expert
- Sanjay Swaroop as Aryan's father
- Satya Krishnan as Witness
- Gemini Suresh as Sub-Inspector Vishnu
- Rajiv Kumar Aneja as Forensic Expert
- Mounika Reddy as Shakthi
- Goparaju Ramana as Moorthy
- Supurna Malakar as Geetha
- Kotesh Manava as Ganesh Venkat Ram
- Swetha Chowdary as Roy's wife
- Apsara Rani in an item number in "Papa Tho Pailam"

== Music ==
Hunt

Soundtrack album by Ghibran
- Released: 12 January 2023
- Recorded: 2022–2023
- Genre: Feature film soundtrack
- Length: 4:09
- Language: Telugu
- Label: Aditya Music
- Producer: Ghibran

Ghibran chronology
Thunivu (2023)	Hunt (2023)	Thalainagaram 2 (2023)

Singles from Hunt
- 1. "Papa Tho Pailam" Released: 11 October 2022

The film's music was composed by Ghibran, with lyrics written by Kasarla Shyam.

Track listing
No.	Title	Lyrics	Singer(s)	Length
1.	"Papa Tho Pailam"	Kasarla Shyam	Mangli, Nakash Aziz	4:09
2.	"Kannulu Chuse Paga"	Balaji	Yazin Nizar	04:28
Total length:				08:37

== Release ==
The film was theatrically released on 26 January 2023 coinciding with the Republic Day. The film was released on Amazon Prime on February 10, 2023.

== Reception ==
Neeshita Nyayapati of The Times of India rated the film 2.5 out of 5 stars and wrote "Hunt is the kind of investigative thriller that does not depend on the usual hijinks. If you’re looking for something different from the usual fare, this is it".
