= Shelter Hall =

Food court in Brighton, England

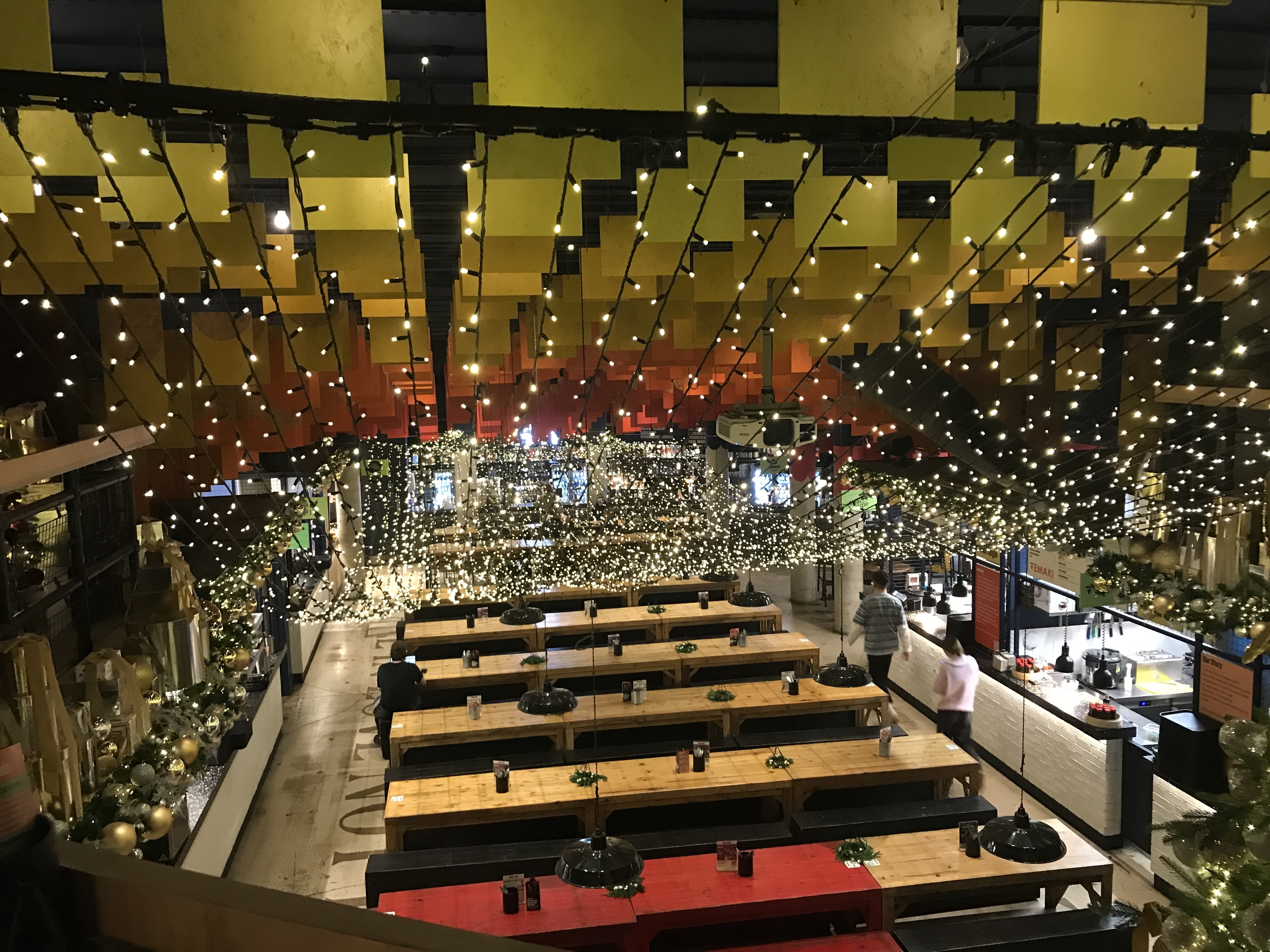
- View from upstairs during the Christmas season
- Interactive map of the Shelter Hall area

General information
- Location: Brighton, Brighton and Hove, England
- Coordinates: 50.8203359°N 0.1451792°W

Technical details
- Floor area: 15,000 sq ft

Website
- shelterhall.co.uk

Shelter Hall is a food court in Brighton, England. It is a prominent landmark, located on the seafront at the bottom of the road leading down from Brighton railway station, and a short distance from the Brighton i360 and the West Pier.

It was built in the 1880s to provide shelter and refreshments to local fisherman and beach goers. During the 1980s and 1990s the space was repurposed from amusement arcade to gym before closing in 2012 due to structural failure. Work to reconstruct the building began in October 2015, and the hall was reopened in 2020.

In 2025, Shelter Hall was sold by food tech platform Sessions to London-based Market Halls, who also operate locations in Victoria, Oxford Street, Canary Wharf and Paddington.

The venue hosts community events such as the annual Christmas light switch-on for the city.
