= Shamantakamani =

- Theatrical release poster
- Directed by: Sriram Adittya
- Written by: Venky; Arjun-Carthyk
- Screenplay by: Sriram Adittya
- Story by: Sriram Adittya
- Produced by: V. Anand Prasad
- Starring: Nara Rohit; Sudheer Babu; Sundeep Kishan; Aadi Saikumar; Rajendra Prasad
- Cinematography: Sameer Reddy
- Edited by: Prawin Pudi
- Music by: Mani Sharma
- Production company: Bhavya Creations
- Distributed by: Freeze Frame Films (Overseas)
- Release date: 14 July 2017
- Running time: 127 mins
- Country: India
- Language: Telugu

Shamantakamani is a 2017 Indian Telugu-language comedy thriller film, produced by V. Anand Prasad on Bhavya Creations banner and directed by Sriram Adittya. The film stars Nara Rohit, Sudheer Babu, Sundeep Kishan, Aadi Saikumar, Rajendra Prasad. The music was composed by Mani Sharma with cinematography by Sameer Reddy and editing by Prawin Pudi.

The film marked the debut of Sudheer Babu's son, Darshan, as a child artist, the grandson of the veteran actor Krishna and nephew to Mahesh Babu. The film's first look motion picture was released on 28 May, and the teaser on 15 June 2017. The film was released on 14 July 2017 to positive reviews. In 2019, the film was dubbed into Hindi as Aakhari Baazi by Aditya Movies.

== Plot ==
In the end, Krishna does not bother about the theft and decides to take care of his father. Siva opens a bar and a restaurant in Kotipalli and realizes that Sridevi's husband orders his friends to give him drinks all the time. Rao migrates to Dubai with his lady love. Karthik decides to go abroad for his master's along with Madhu. Ranjith becomes the subject of a departmental inquiry for his corrupt practices.

== Cast ==
- Sudheer Babu as Krishna
  - Master Darshan as Young Krishna
- Nara Rohit as Circle Inspector Ranjith Kumar
- Sundeep Kishan as Kotipalli Siva
- Aadi Saikumar as Karthik Sastry
- Rajendra Prasad as Uma Maheswara Rao
- Chandini Chowdary as Madhu, Karthik's girlfriend
- Suman as Jaganath, Krishna's father
- Tanikella Bharani as A. K. Ganapathi Sastry, Karthik's father
- Indraja as Bhanumathi, Uma Maheshwara Rao's love interest
- Kasthuri as Krishna's mother
- Surekha Vani as Krishna's stepmother
- Hema as Karthik's mother
- Satyam Rajesh as Siva's friend
- Banerjee as Madhu's father
- Jenny Honey as Sridevi, Siva's former love interest
- Raghu Karumanchi as Constable Satyanarayana
- Gundu Sudarshan as Mani Ratnam
- Jeeva as ACB Officer
- Giridhar as Jaganath's PA
- Ananya Soni as Smitha
- Sarika Ramachandra Rao as Chandram
- Sriram R Eragam as A. K. Khan
- RJ Hemanth as Krishna's friend
- Abhay Bethiganti
- Laxman Meesala
- Sriram Adittya as Sridevi's husband (cameo appearance)

== Soundtrack ==
Shamantakamani

Film score by Mani Sharma
- Released: 3 July 2017
- Recorded: 2017
- Genre: Soundtrack
- Length: 3:59
- Producer: Mani Sharma

Mani Sharma chronology
Ami Thumi (2017)	Shamantakamani (2017)	Aaradugula Bullet (2017)

All lyrics are written by Ramajogayya Sastry; all music is composed by Mani Sharma.

No.	Title	Singer(s)	Length
1.	"Padha Padha Padha"	Ramya Behara	3:59
Total length:			3:59

== Reception ==
=== Critical reception ===
Jeevi of Idlebrain.com wrote that "On a whole, Shamanthakamani is an authentic thriller that entertains. You may watch it!" A critic from The Times of India wrote that "If it has to be called an experiment, the film doesn’t disappoint".

=== Box office ===
Shamantakamani grossed over ₹3.3 crore on its opening day and collected a distributor's share of ₹1.65 crore. It minted a share of ₹3.51 crore in its opening weekend.
