= Devadas (2018 film) =

2018 Indian Telugu film directed and written by Sriram Adittya

- Theatrical release poster
- Directed by: Sriram Adittya
- Written by: Sriram Adittya
- Produced by: C. Ashwini Dutt
- Starring: Nagarjuna; Rashmika Mandanna; Aakanksha Singh; Nani
- Cinematography: Shamdat Sainudeen
- Edited by: Prawin Pudi
- Music by: Mani Sharma
- Production company: Vyjayanthi Movies
- Distributed by: Viacom18 Motion Pictures
- Release date: 27 September 2018
- Running time: 164 mins
- Country: India
- Language: Telugu
- Box office: est. ₹48 crore

Devadas is a 2018 Indian Telugu-language action comedy film produced by C. Ashwini Dutt under the banner of Vyjayanthi Movies and directed by Sriram Adittya. The film stars Nagarjuna, Nani, Aakanksha Singh, and Rashmika Mandanna. It has music composed by Mani Sharma. The plot of the film is inspired from the Malayalam film Bhargavacharitham Moonam Khandam (2006), which takes inspiration from the 1999 film Analyze This.

The film was theatrically released on 27 September 2018 and underperformed at the box office despite the positive reception.

== Plot ==
Dr. M. K. Das, an M.S. gold medalist, joins Medimax, a corporate hospital in Hyderabad, as a mortuary surgeon. Four days after starting, he alters a patient's prescription without the consent of his senior, Dr. Bharadwaj, after noticing improper medication. Although the patient recovers, Bharadwaj fires Das due to his ego and perceived unprofessional behaviour. Left with no choice, Das opens a clinic at the dilapidated Shantabhai Memorial Charity Hospital in his locality. Meanwhile, police search for Deva, an elusive crime boss who returns to Hyderabad after his mentor and foster father, Dada, is murdered by a rival mobster David with the help of Dada's deceptive son, Ajay.

During a shootout with the police, Deva is injured and escapes to Shantabhai Memorial Charity Hospital, where Das treats him without realizing his identity. Upon learning that Deva is a crime boss, Das chooses not to report him due to his condition. Impressed by Das's integrity and naivety, Deva befriends him, affectionately nicknaming him "Gold" due to his medal. Deva and his henchman renovate the clinic, causing patient flow to surge. As Das gets busy as a practicing physician, he is equally baffled by the number of gangsters surrounding him daily.

Das falls in love with Pooja, unaware that she is an undercover cop assigned to capture Deva. Simultaneously, Deva reveals his unspoken feelings for journalist named Jahnvi. As Das attempts to bring Deva and Jahnvi together by posing Deva as a CBI officer, Deva finds himself becoming more humanized. To facilitate Deva's arrest, Pooja asks Das to invite Deva to a dinner at a restaurant. While the police wait to ambush him, Deva learns of Ajay's location and kills him in front of Das. Disturbed by the murder and Deva's disregard for human life, Das severs ties with him and rejoins Medimax after promising to organize a successful organ donation camp.

Heartbroken by the rift, Deva meets his henchman's terminally ill child with blood cancer, who requests him to "scare death". Deva arranges for the child's treatment, but the child dies. Meanwhile, with Deva's secret assistance, Medimax's organ donation camp succeeds, earning Das the respect of Bharadwaj. Devastated by the child's death, Deva contacts Jahnvi to arrange a live broadcast in which he reveals his true identity as the wanted mob boss and credits Das with inspiring his transformation.

However, David kidnaps Das and forces Deva into a private standoff. Deva arrives at David's location as police follow, leading to a massive shootout in which Deva is critically wounded. With help from Dr. Bharadwaj, Das and two fellow surgeons fake Deva's death. Deva, Das, Jahnvi, and Pooja, who has fallen in love with Das, ultimately depart together to enjoy a holiday on a cruise.

== Cast ==
- Nagarjuna as Deva (based on devdas)
- Nani as Dr. Das (based on chunnilal)
- Rashmika Mandanna as Inspector Pooja (based on chandramukhi)
- Aakanksha Singh as Reporter Jahnavi (based on paro)
- Sarathkumar as Dada, Deva's foster father (guest appearance)
- Kunal Kapoor as David
- Naveen Chandra as Ajay, Dada's son
- Naresh as Mohan, Das's brother
- Satya Krishnan as Das's sister-in-law
- Murali Sharma as Police Officer Murali Sharma
- Rao Ramesh as Dr. Bharadwaj
- Vennela Kishore as Dr. Kuchipudi, a psychiatrist
- Srinivas Avasarala as Rajan, Deva's personal assistant
- Manobala as Tata Rao, Pooja's assistant
- Aishwarya as Fishfry Lakshmi
- Sivannarayana Naripeddi as Pooja's father
- Prabhakar as Deva's henchman
- Prudhviraj as Jahnavi's manager
- Raghu Karumanchi as Local Rowdy Ramayya
- Prabhas Sreenu as Seenu, David's henchmen
- Sameer as Doctor
- Uttej as Raju, Seetharamayya's driver
- Satya as Jacket, Das's clinic compounder
- Sampoornesh Babu as Actor (cameo appearance)
- S. P. Balasubrahmanyam as Medimax Hospital Chairman Seetharamayya (cameo appearance)

== Production ==
Devdas was the first film to be shot in Hyderabad Metro.

== Soundtrack ==
The film's music was composed by Mani Sharma and on Aditya Music label. The Audio launch was held on 21 September 2018, on Akkineni Nageswara Rao's birthday.

Sify termed the album lackluster, stating that although "Vaaru Veeru", "Chettu Kinda Doctor", and "Emo Emo" were good songs, the rest were lacking when it came to Mani Sharma's expectations.

Devadas

Soundtrack album by Mani Sharma
- Released: 21 September 2018
- Recorded: 2018
- Genre: Soundtrack
- Length: 29:16
- Label: Aditya Music
- Producer: Mani Sharma

Mani Sharma chronology
Ee Maya Peremito (2018)	Devadas (2018)

Track-List
No.	Title	Lyrics	Singer(s)	Length
1.	"Vaaru Veeru"	Sirivennela Seetharama Sastry	Anurag Kulkarni, Anjana Sowmya	4:26
2.	"Chettu Kinda Doctor"	Ramajogayya Sastry	Padmalatha	5:10
3.	"Laka Laka Lakumikara"	Ramajogayya Sastry	Anurag Kulkarni, Sri Krishna	4:53
4.	"Hey Babu"	Ramajogayya Sastry	Karthik, Ramya Behara	5:00
5.	"Emo Emo"	Sirivennela Seetharama Sastry	Sid Sriram, Ramya Behara	4:26
6.	"Manasedo Vethukuthu Undi"	Sirivennela Seetharama Sastry	Yazin Nizar, Anurag Kulkarni	5:21
Total length:				29:16

== Release ==
Devadas was released on 27 September 2018. It is dubbed in Tamil under the same title and in Hindi as Don Aur Doctor by Zee Studios in November 2019. The Hindi dubbed version was available in Iran.

== Critical reception ==
The Times of India rated the film 3.5 stars and said, "Devadas certainly has its moments with some cracking humour and solid performances by its two stars. A tad too long, with some avoidable melodrama and a weak climax, proves to be troublesome, but it doesn't take it away from a hilarious first half which makes it worth your while. If you're somebody who enjoys Nani's brand of humour - Devadas is a must-watch." The News Minute wrote, "All this leaves you wishing that the director, for a brief moment, had realised the pot of gold he had at his disposal. It displays a certain brash level of amateurishness if your actual comedians in the movie, the sidekicks, almost get as much screen time as your protagonists. Food for thought! So, if you want to watch a comedy featuring Nani, watch it. Don’t watch if you are hoping for an ‘action’ comedy."

Sify gave the film three stars and stated that "DevaDas has a not-so-engaging story. But the comedy works very well in the first half. The second half falters with many dull moments. A violent don becoming a good man is an oversimplification. Nice technical output needs a pat." The Hindu criticized the film for poorly etched characters and wrote, "Despite all this, if Devadas holds attention, it’s because Sriram Adittya knows how to utilise its two leading actors and serve up plenty of fun moments. In the end, he gets Deva and Das to look at life from each other’s perspectives with some melodrama." Deccan Chronicle gave the film three stars and said that it was "Nag and Nani's show all the way".

== Awards and nominations ==
Date of ceremony	Award	Category	Recipient(s) and nominee(s)	Result	Ref.
15 & 16 August 2019	South Indian International Movie Awards	Best Actor in a Negative Role – Telugu	Kunal Kapoor	Nominated	
