= Soukhyam =

- Movie poster
- Directed by: A. S. Ravi Kumar Chowdary
- Screenplay by: Kona Venkat; Gopimohan
- Story by: Sridhar Seepanna
- Produced by: V. Anand Prasad
- Starring: Gopichand; Regina Cassandra
- Cinematography: Prasad Murella
- Edited by: Gautham Raju
- Music by: Anup Rubens
- Production company: Bhavya Creations
- Release date: 24 December 2015
- Country: India
- Language: Telugu
- Budget: ₹15 crore (US$1.6 million)

Soukhyam (transl. Comfort) is a 2015 Indian Telugu-language romantic action comedy film produced by V. Anand Prasad on Bhavya Creations banner and directed by A.S. Ravi Kumar Chowdary. The film stars Gopichand and Regina Cassandra and also features Mukesh Rishi, Pradeep Rawat, Devan and Brahmanandam in the supporting roles. the music composed by Anup Rubens. Kona Venkat and Gopimohan provided the screenplay, written by Sridhar Sepanna. Prasad Murella is the cinematographer, Gautham Raju is the editor and the film was released on 24 December 2015 on Christmas Eve. The film was a disaster at the box office.

== Cast ==
- Gopichand as Srinivas Rao ("Seenu")
- Regina Cassandra as Sailaja (Shailu)
- Mukesh Rishi as Krishna Rao, Seenu's father
- Pradeep Rawat as Bavuji
- Devan as PR, Shailu's father
- Bramhanandam as Daya
- Jaya Prakash Reddy as Pellikoduku
- Posani Krishna Murali as Tirupathi Train Passenger
- Prudhviraj as Shivudu
- Raghu Babu as Deva, Seenu's uncle
- Satya Krishnan as Deva's wife
- Satyam Rajesh as Dr. Sidhappa
- Sowcar Janaki as Modern Bamma
- Pragathi as Sujatha, Seenu's mother
- Naramalli Sivaprasad as Perfume Prasad
- Saptagiri as Giri
- Krishna Bhagawan as Akuvakkala Ananda Rao, Seenu's friend-in-law
- Sivaji Raja as Seenu's brother-in-law
- Surekha Vani as Seenu's sister
- Gundu Sudarshan as Train Passenger
- Raghu Karumanchi as Bavuji's henchman
- Ambati Arjun as Arjun, Bavuji's son
- Chanti as Constable
- C. V. Subbareddy
- Sarika Ramachandra Rao
- Ramachandra
- Tarzan Laxminarayana
- Rajitha
- Apoorva
- Jyothi

== Soundtrack ==
Soukhyam

Soundtrack album by Anup Rubens
- Released: 13 December 2015
- Recorded: 2015
- Genre: Soundtrack
- Length: 18:55
- Label: Zee Music Company
- Producer: Anup Rubens

Anup Rubens chronology
Akhil (2015)	Soukhyam (2015)	Soggade Chinni Nayana (2016)

The music was composed by Anup Rubens and was released on Zee Music Company.

Track-List
No.	Title	Lyrics	Singer(s)	Length
1.	"Nakem Tochade"	Ramajogayya Sastry	Hariharan	4:06
2.	"You Are My Honey"	Bhaskarabhatla Ravi Kumar	Nakash Aziz, Mohana Bhogaraju	3:40
3.	"Alare Aala"	Ramajogayya Sastry	Manisha Eerabathini, Rahul Pandey	3:46
4.	"Jigi Jigi Jindagi"	Ramajogayya Sastry	Raman	3:20
5.	"Lollipop"	Bhaskarabhatla Ravi Kumar	Geeta Madhuri	4:00
Total length:				18:55

== Reception ==
=== Critical reception ===
A critic from The Times of India wrote that "Soukhyam has neither has novelty nor does it innovate in anyway". A critic from The Hindu wrote that "Soukhyam has all that’s considered essential for a box office success — a lead pair with good screen presence, romance, action and comedy and yet, it all ends up being bland".

=== Box office ===
Soukhyam grossed over ₹10 crore in its opening weekend and minted a distributor's share of ₹7 crore.
