= Eeswaran =

2021 film directed by Suseenthiran

- Theatrical release poster
- Directed by: Suseenthiran
- Written by: Suseenthiran; Sanjay
- Produced by: Balaji Kapa
- Starring: Silambarasan; Bharathiraja; Nidhhi Agerwal; Nandita Swetha
- Cinematography: Tirru
- Edited by: Anthony
- Music by: Thaman S
- Production companies: Madhav Media; D Company
- Distributed by: 7G Films
- Release date: 14 January 2021
- Running time: 123 minutes
- Country: India
- Language: Tamil

Eeswaran is a 2021 Indian Tamil-language action drama film directed by Suseenthiran. The film stars Silambarsan in the titular role, alongside Bharathiraja, Nidhhi Agerwal (in her Tamil debut) and Nandita Swetha. The film has music scored by Thaman S, whereas cinematography and editing were handled by Tirru and Anthony respectively.

Principal photography commenced on Dindigul in September 2020 and wrapped that November. The film was released on 14 January 2021, coinciding with Pongal.

== Plot ==
Periyasamy is a farmer who leads a simple, happy life with his wife, Paapathi, and their children. One day, the family astrologer Kaali, Paapathi's younger brother, visits and accurately predicts their past and future. That same day, Paapathi slips, suffers a head injury and dies, leaving Periyasamy devastated. Years later, his children marry and move to Chennai for work, leaving him alone in the village. He eagerly awaits their occasional visits.

Eeswaran, a street-smart young man, becomes Periyasamy's house help and foster son, using his resourcefulness and connections with influential people to solve problems. In March 2020, the Government of India imposed a COVID-19-related lockdown, prompting Periyasamy's family to return to the village. Delighted to have his grandchildren with him, Periyasamy consults Kaali, who predicts a death within days. Fearing coronavirus, the family takes PCR tests, which are negative. However, a doctor tells Eeswaran that Periyasamy's granddaughter Diya has a rare heart condition requiring immediate surgery. Eeswaran secretly arranges the operation to spare the family further worry.

Periyasamy's granddaughter Vasuki, Eeswaran's married former girlfriend, also arrives during the lockdown. They had separated because Eeswaran refused to leave Periyasamy, while Vasuki's younger sister Poongodi falls in love with him. Periyasamy encourages Eeswaran to accept Poongodi, after revealing his own tragic history: he loved Parvathi but married Paapathi at his mother's request. When Parvathi later returned to his life, they married and had a son, Aadhisivan. After Paapathi discovered their relationship, Parvathi disappeared with Aadhisivan, and Periyasamy never learned their whereabouts. Eeswaran accepts Poongodi's proposal.

Meanwhile, Periyasamy's son-in-law Maragadhamani suffers mounting business losses and debts. When Periyasamy refuses to sell his ancestral land to help him, Maragadhamani plots his murder by sending poisonous cobras to the farm. Eeswaran foils the plan but is bitten by a cobra. Although he attacks Maragadhamani, the family expels him for being an outsider. When Diya collapses, the family attempts to take her to hospital, but Periyasamy's enemy Rathnaswamy, recently released from prison, blocks them, seeking revenge for the deaths of his wife and daughter, which he blames on Periyasamy. Despite the snake venom spreading through his body, Eeswaran rescues the family and reaches Diya before collapsing.

Sonamuthu and Eeswaran's friend Kutty Puli then reveal that Eeswaran is actually Aadhisivan, Periyasamy and Parvathi's son. Parvathi had concealed his identity as her dying wish. Periyasamy and the family are overwhelmed by the revelation. Eeswaran recovers from the snake bite, while Diya's surgery succeeds, and the family reunites happily.

Eeswaran marries Poongodi, resolves Maragadhamani's debts and advises him to manage his finances responsibly. He then learns that Kaali has died, suggesting that the astrologer's prediction ultimately came true.

== Cast ==
- Silambarasan as Aadhisivan (Eeswaran)
- Nidhhi Agerwal as Poongodi
- Nandita Swetha as Vasuki, Poongodi's sister and Aadhisivan's ex-girlfriend
- Bharathiraja as Periyasamy
  - Manoj Bharathiraja as younger Periyasamy
- Stun Siva as Rathnaswamy Gounder
- Vinodhini Vaidyanathan as Papathi Periyasamy
- Munishkanth as Maragathamani, Periyasamy's son-in-law
- Bala Saravanan as Kutty Puli, Eeswaran's friend
- Aruldoss as Aadhinathan, Periyasamy's son
- Kaali Venkat as Astrologer Kaali
- Harish Uthaman as S. I. Sabarinathan
- Sri Durga as Parvathi, Easwaran's mother
- Vasavi as Aathira Maragathamani, Periyasamy's daughter
- Yaar Kannan as Sonnamuthu
- Cheenu Mohan as Chinnaiah
- R. B. Yogeswaran as Aadhipiraan
- 'Pichaikkaran' Moorthy as Aadhimoorthy
- Vaiyapuri as Kaipulla
- Lakshmi as Barathi
- Adhavan as Mayakannan
- Saravana Sakthi as Mayakannan's friend
- Yaar Kannan as Sonamuthu

== Production ==
In September 2020, Silambarasan was reported to be a part of Suseenthiran's untitled film. The project was officially announced a month later, with Nidhhi Agerwal confirmed as the lead actress. Silambarasan released the first look of the film on 26 October, during Vijayadashami, in which the title was revealed to be Eeswaran. The film was produced by Madhav Media, with cinematography by Tirru, editing by Anthony and art direction by Rajeevan.

For his role in the film, Silambarasan took an extremely intense weight training and strict diet regime, under his trainer Sandeep Raj, in which he lost 30 kilograms (66 lb) in the process. He also indulged in sports as a part of the fitness regime, and learned Bharatanatyam from former actress Saranya Mohan for a few sequences.

Principal photography commenced in October 2020, taking place in Dindigul and Madurai, and wrapped in early November 2020. Silambarasan completed his dubbing portions the next day.

== Soundtrack ==
The music for the film is composed by Thaman S, in his third collaboration with Silambarasan after Osthe (2011) and Vaalu (2015), and first time with Suseenthiran. The lyrics for the songs were written by Yugabharathi. The first single "Thamizhan Paattu" was released on 14 December 2020. The full soundtrack album was released on 2 January 2021.

== Release ==
Eeswaran was released on 14 January 2021, coinciding with Pongal. The Tamil Nadu theatrical rights were bought by 7G Films. It was released directly via the streaming service OlyFlix for viewers overseas.

== Reception ==
M. Suganth of The Times of India, gave 2.5 out of 5 and stated "The lack of novel ideas, ineffective twists and female leads who have hardly anything to do affect the flow of the film. The emotional scenes lack required intensity, and the tension surrounding the antagonist could have been much better." Srinivasa Ramanujan of The Hindu stated "The Simbu-starrer is yet another village-based tale that has more uncles and relatives than ideas." Sify gave 2.5 out of 5 and stated "Eeswaran is an average formulaic rural family entertainer."

Ranjani Krishnakumar of Firstpost gave 1.5 out of 5 and stated "In bringing together this colourful and relatable cast of characters, Suseenthiran scores. But that's that. Once he's established the milieu, he doesn't know where to take the film." Ashameera Aiyappan of Cinema Express gave 1.5 out of 5 and stated "It is great that Simbu looks like he has turned back time. But it isn't great that the film also seems to have travelled back with him." Manoj Kumar R of The Indian Express gave 1 out of 5 stars "Eeswaran is nothing but a two-hour-long verbal and visual flow of cues that reinforce the patriarchal view of women's subservient role to men in a family."

Logesh Balachandran of India Today gave 3.5 out of 5 and wrote "Eeswaran isn't a great film, but director Suseenthiran gets many things right. At a time when fans are longing to witness that energetic Simbu on screen, which has been missing for years now, Suseenthiran delivers a perfect rural entertainer that serves just that. The screenplay has been developed in a manner to please both the star's fans and family audience. Unlike the actor's previous films, there is adequate emotion in the script which works big time."

== Controversies ==
=== Snake issue ===
In the motion poster of the film which was released on 26 October, the protagonist Silambarasan had a snake wrapped around his neck a forest official filed a case stating that the team had given sedatives to the animal to prevent it from harming the team which kills the animal very soon and also said that many crews are lying telling it is a fake snake. However, the team stated that the snake was plastic and no harm was there for the animal as well as the crew. But a video was released in which Silambarasan practised throwing a snake in a sack bag, but the team said it was a scene in the film and the snake was a fake one. On 19 November, the Animal Welfare Board of India, objected the film's team to remove the controversial motion poster, which was later removed from YouTube.

=== Harassment against Suseenthiran ===
Suseendhiran was involved in controversy over unnecessarily interrupting when Nidhhi Agerwal was speaking to the public during the film's audio launch. Suseendhiran reportedly urged Agerwal to say that she loves Silambarasan. His distasteful behaviour was heavily criticised via social media for harassing Agerwal in public. However Suseendhiran clarified that he wanted to give the essence to the audience on how the film will work.

=== 100% seating capacity issue in Tamil Nadu ===
The film was given permission to release the film with 100% seating capacity in theatres along with another Pongal release Master (2021) by the Government of Tamil Nadu despite the increase in COVID-19 cases in India especially with cases also increasing in Tamil Nadu. However the Central Government of India issued warrant against Tamil Nadu government's decision to approve the release of the films with full 100% seating capacity. The central government stated that 100% seat occupancy is clearly in violation of the guidelines of MHA which only allows 50% seat occupancy in theatres. Some doctors also cautioned against full seating capacity for the film. Soon after, Central Government notice was passed and it was revoked back to 50% seating capacity in Tamil Nadu theatres.

=== Streaming release issue ===
In overseas countries, the makers had signed a deal with OlyFlix, wherein the makers would premiere the film through video-on-demand from 14 January 2021 (coinciding with the release in Indian theatres). However, the Tamil Nadu Theatre Owners Association opposed the decision for a simultaneous streaming release, fearing that piracy sites may upload the high definition print of the film, which will affect the theatrical business. The exhibitors also threatened to boycott the film, if they suggest for a streaming release on the said date. Following pressure from theatre owners and exhibitors, the makers decided to hold the release over video-on-demand, and instead they requested the theatre owners to increase the number of screens for the film.
