= Sudheer Babu =

Indian actor (born 1977)

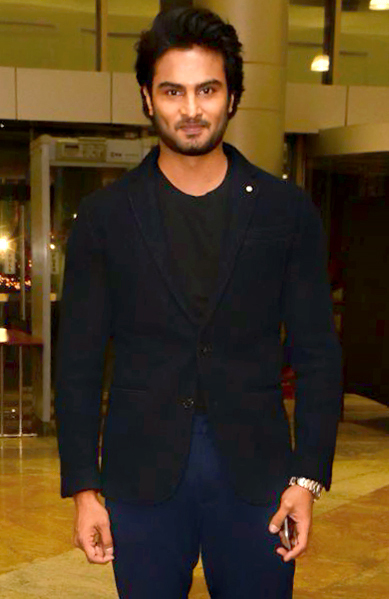
- Babu in 2018
- Born: Posani Naga Sudheer Babu; 11 May 1977 (age 49); Vijayawada, Andhra Pradesh, India
- Other name: Nitro Star
- Occupation: Actor
- Years active: 2010–present
- Spouse: Priyadarshini (m. 2006)
- Children: 2
- Relatives: Krishna (father-in-law); Mahesh Babu (brother-in-law); Manjula Ghattamaneni (sister-in-law)

Posani Naga Sudheer Babu (born 11 May 1977) is an Indian actor and former professional badminton player. He works primarily in Telugu films. Debuted as a lead actor in Shiva Manasulo Shruti (2012), Babu's successful films include Prema Katha Chitram (2013), Baaghi (2016), and Sammohanam (2018). He won SIIMA Special Jury award for his performance in Sammohanam.

== Film career ==
Babu began his acting career with a supporting role in Gautham Vasudev Menon-directed Ye Maaya Chesave (2010), produced by his sister-in-law Manjula Ghattamaneni. His first film in a leading role was Siva Manasulo Sruthi (2012), a remake of Tamil film Siva Manasula Sakthi (2009).

Babu tasted success with the 2013 horror comedy film, Prema Katha Chitram. Made on a budget of ₹2 crore, the film went onto gross ₹20 crore at the box office. In the same year, he appeared in Aadu Magaadra Bujji. In 2015, Babu played the lead role in three films, Krishnamma Kalipindi Iddarini, Mosagallaku Mosagadu, and Bhale Manchi Roju.

In 2016, Babu made his Hindi film debut with Baaghi, where he played an antagonistic role. His 2017 film Samanthakamani was a commercial success.

In 2018, Babu teamed up with director Mohana Krishna Indraganti for the romantic drama film Sammohanam. The film where a young cartoonist falls for an actress turned out to be a profitable venture. In the same year, he appeared in two other films, namely Nannu Dochukunduvate and Veera Bhoga Vasantha Rayalu.

In his second collaboration with Indraganti, Babu appeared in action thriller V (2020) alongside actor Nani.

== Badminton career ==
Prior to entering the film industry, Babu was the Number 1 ranked badminton player of Andhra Pradesh as well as Karnataka. He has played alongside Pullela Gopichand as a doubles partner. He is scheduled to play Gopichand in the latter's biopic.

== Personal life ==
Sudheer Babu is married to Priyadarshini, daughter of actor Krishna and younger sister of Mahesh Babu. The couple has two sons.

== Filmography ==
Key
†	Denotes films that have not yet been released

Year	Title	Role(s)	Notes	Ref
2010	Ye Maaya Chesave	Jerry Thekekuthu	Uncredited supporting role	
2012	Shiva Manasulo Shruti	Siva	Debut film in a lead role	
2013	Prema Katha Chitram	Sudheer		
2013	Aadu Magaadra Bujji	Siddhu		
2015	Dongaata	Himself	Guest appearance	
2015	Krishnamma Kalipindi Iddarini	Krishna		
2015	Mosagallaku Mosagaadu	Krish		
2015	Bhale Manchi Roju	Ram		
2016	Sri Sri	Police Inspector	Guest appearance	
2016	Baaghi	Raghav	Hindi film	
2017	Shamanthakamani	Krishna		
2017	Anando Brahma	Himself	Guest appearance	
2018	Sammohanam	Vijay		
2018	Nannu Dochukunduvate	Karthik		
2018	Veera Bhoga Vasantha Rayalu	SI Vinay Rao		
2020	V	DCP Aditya		
2021	Sridevi Soda Center	"Lighting" Soori Babu		
2022	Aa Ammayi Gurinchi Meeku Cheppali	Naveen		
2023	Hunt	ACP P. Arjun Prasad		
2023	Mama Mascheendra	Parasuram & Durga / DJ (Note: Sudheer Babu played dual roles in this film, one of who has two different names.)	Dual role	
2024	Harom Hara	Subramanyam		
2024	Maa Nanna Superhero	Johnny		
2025	Jatadhara	Shiva	Hindi-Telugu bilingual film	

== Awards and nominations ==
Year	Award	Category	Film	Result	Ref.
2013	2nd SIIMA	SIIMA Award for Best Male Debut (Telugu)	Siva Manasulo Sruthi	Won	
2016	5th SIIMA	The South Sensation of the Year	General	Won	
2019	8th SIIMA	SIIMA Award for Best Actor (Telugu)	Sammohanam	Nominated	
2019	8th SIIMA	Special Jury Award - Telugu	Sammohanam	Won	
2019	Zee Cine Awards Telugu	Best Entertainer of the Year	Sammohanam	Won	
2021	9th SIIMA	SIIMA Award for Best Actor (Telugu)	V	Nominated	
2021	9th SIIMA	SIIMA Award for Best Actor (Telugu) - Critics Choice	V	Won	
