= Nidhhi Agerwal =

Indian actress

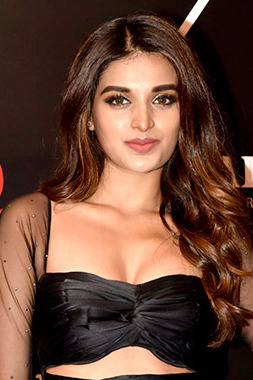
- Agerwal in 2018
- Born: 17 August 1992/1993; Hyderabad, Andhra Pradesh, India
- Education: Christ University, Bengaluru
- Occupation: Actress
- Years active: 2017 - present

Nidhhi Agerwal is an Indian actress who primarily works in Telugu and Tamil films. After participating in Miss Diva Universe 2014, Agerwal made her acting debut with the Hindi film Munna Michael (2017), for which she received Zee Cine Award for Best Female Debut.

Agerwal made her Telugu debut with Savyasachi (2018) and Tamil debut with Eeswaran (2021). For the former, she received SIIMA Award for Best Female Debut - Telugu nominations. She has been part of successful films including iSmart Shankar (2019) and Kalaga Thalaivan (2022).

== Early life and education ==
Agerwal was born in Hyderabad and was brought up in Bengaluru. Born into a Hindi-speaking Marwari family, she can understand as well as speak Telugu, Tamil, and Kannada. Her birth year is reported inconsistently as either 1992 or 1993.

Agerwal did her schooling at Vidyashilp Academy in Bengaluru. She then completed her graduation in Business Management from Christ University, Bengaluru. She is well trained in ballet.

== Career ==
In 2016, director Sabbir Khan confirmed that Agerwal was signed as the lead in his film Munna Michael, alongside Tiger Shroff. She was chosen from among 300 candidates. Agerwal was also asked to sign a no-dating clause till completion of the film. She made her acting debut with the film, which received mixed to negative reviews from critics.

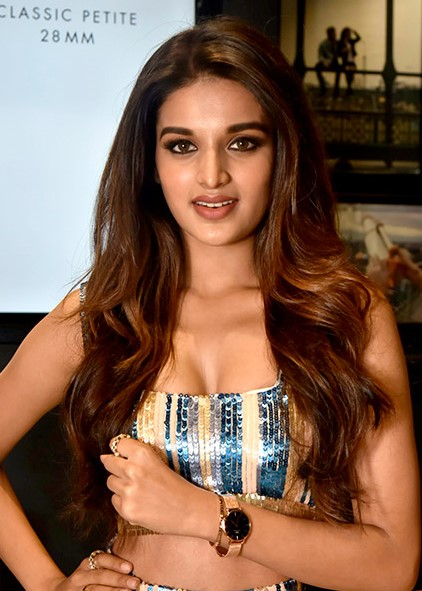
Agerwal at an event in 2018

Agerwal made her Telugu film debut in 2018 alongside Naga Chaitanya, with the film Savyasachi. It did not perform well at the box-office. She had two releases in 2019. Mr. Majnu with Akhil Akkineni was unsuccessful at the box-office whereas iSmart Shankar alongside Ram Pothineni was a commercial success running for more than 100 days at the box office. The same year, Agerwal appeared in two music videos, Unglich Ring Daal De sung by Jyotica Tangri and AAHO! Mittran Di Yes Hai with Badshah.

In 2021, she made her Tamil debut opposite Silambarasan in Eeswaran. The film received mixed reviews and was an average success. Her next film, Bhoomi with Jayam Ravi released the same year. It received negative reviews. She also appeared opposite Sonu Sood in Altaf Raja's recreation of Saath Kya Nibhaoge song. In 2022, she appeared Hero alongside debutant Ashok Galla. The film received mixed reviews from the critics and audiences as well. She also appeared alongside Udhayanidhi Stalin in Magizh Thirumeni's action-thriller film Kalaga Thalaivan, which received positive reviews from critics. She was next seen as Panchami in Hari Hara Veera Mallu, that was released in July 2025. It became a box office bomb.

== In the media ==
Agerwal in 2018

Agerwal has featured on Hyderabad Times Most Desirable Woman list, several times. She was placed 11th in 2019, and 8th in 2020. She is a celebrity endorser for several brands and products. In 2019, she rejected a fairness cream endorsement. Agerwal has also been part of Kalyan Jewellers multilingual ad.

== Filmography ==
Key
†	Denotes films that have not yet been released

=== Films ===
List of Nidhhi Agerwal film credits
Year	Title	Role	Language	Notes	Ref.
2017	Munna Michael	Deepika Sharma "Dolly"	Hindi		
2018	Savyasachi	Chitra	Telugu		
2019	Mr. Majnu	Nikitha "Nikki"	Telugu		
2019	iSmart Shankar	Dr. Sarah	Telugu		
2021	Eeswaran	Poongodi	Tamil		
2021	Bhoomi	Shakthi	Tamil		
2022	Hero	Subhadra "Subbu" Sripati	Telugu		
2022	Kalaga Thalaivan	Maithili	Tamil		
2025	Hari Hara Veera Mallu	Panchami	Telugu		
2026	The RajaSaab	Bessy	Telugu		

=== Music videos ===
List of Nidhhi Agerwal music video credits
Year	Title	Singer(s)	Ref.
2019	Unglich Ring Daal De	Jyotica Tangri	
2019	AAHO! Mittran Di Yes Hai	Badshah	
2021	Saath Kya Nibhaoge	Altaf Raja	

== Awards and nominations ==
List of awards and nominations received by Nidhhi Agerwal
Year	Award	Category	Film	Result	Ref.
2017	Zee Cine Awards	Best Female Debut	Munna Michael	Won	
2019	SIIMA Awards	Best Female Debut - Telugu	Savyasachi	Nominated	

Other Honours

- Yamaha Fascino Miss Diva 2014 - Finalist
