= Lavanya Tripathi =

Indian actress (born 1990)

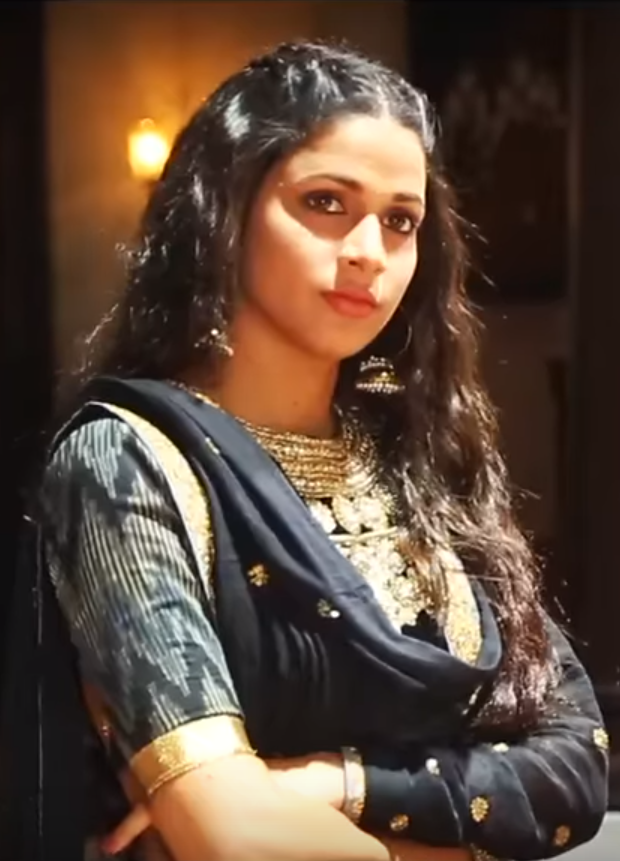
- Tripathi in 2017
- Born: 15 December 1990 (age 35); Ayodhya, Uttar Pradesh, India
- Other name: Lavanya Tripathi
- Education: Rishi Dayaram National College, Mumbai
- Occupation: Actress
- Years active: 2006–present
- Spouse: Varun Tej (m. 2023)
- Children: 1
- Family: Konidela (by marriage)

Lavanya Tripathi Konidela (née Tripathi; born 15 December 1990) is an Indian actress who primarily works in Telugu films. Tripathi is a recipient of several accolades including nominations for two SIIMA Awards and one Filmfare Awards South.

Tripathi started her career as a model and won Femina Miss Uttarakhand in 2006. She then made her acting debut with the Hindi television show Pyaar Ka Bandhan (2009) and made her film debut with Andala Rakshasi (2012). Post her film debut, she had initial success with Doosukeltha (2013) and Bramman (2014). Tripathi earned recognition for portraying a dance teacher in Bhale Bhale Magadivoy (2015) and a lonely wife in Soggade Chinni Nayana (2016), receiving the Filmfare Award for Best Actress – Telugu nomination for the latter. Tripathi then had success in Srirastu Subhamastu (2016), Vunnadhi Okate Zindagi (2017), Arjun Suravaram (2019) and A1 Express (2021). She has since starred in the streaming series Puli Meka (2023) and Miss Perfect (2024).

In addition to her acting career, Tripathi is a prominent celebrity endorser for brands and products. She is married to actor Varun Tej with whom she has a son.

== Early life and background ==
Tripathi was born 15 December 1989, in Ayodhya, Uttar Pradesh and she grew up in Dehradun, Uttarakhand. Her father is a lawyer practicing in High Court and Civil Court and her mother is a retired teacher. She has two elder siblings, one brother and sister. After completing her schooling from Marshall School, Dehradun, she moved to Mumbai, where she graduated in economics from Rishi Dayaram National College.

She stated that she "always wanted to be in showbiz," but her father wanted her to complete her education first. She then started modelling, appearing in commercials, while also being part of television shows. She won the title of Miss Uttarakhand in 2006 when still in school. Tripathi's background in classical dancing, Bharatanatyam came in handy for her role in the film Bhale Bhale Magadivoy.

== Career ==
=== Early work and expansion to films (2006–2014) ===
Tripathi started her acting career with Hindi television, appearing in various episodes of Ssshhhh...Koi Hai from 2006 to 2009. She next appeared as a contestant on Get Gorgeous 5 in 2008 and stood at 9th place. Tripathi made her fiction debut with Sony TV's Pyaar Ka Bandhan. She portrayed Mishti Das / Araina Rai from 2009 to 2010. Her last appearance on television was in 2010, when she portrayed Sakshi, in an episode of CID.

Tripathi made her film debut with the 2012 Telugu film Andala Rakshasi, after a friend suggested her to attend the audition for the role. She played Midhuna, a young girl mourning her lover's death. Her performance earned her several accolades including CineMAA Award for Best Female Debut and a nomination for SIIMA Award for Best Female Debut – Telugu. A critic of 123telugu noted, "Lavanya is incredibly beautiful in the film. She acts well and add certain innocence and charm to the character."

The following year in 2013, Tripathi played a doctor Alekhya opposite Vishnu Manchu, in Doosukeltha. The film became a box office success. Jeevi from Idlebrain.com stated that she suits the character well. Tripathi expanded to Tamil films in 2014 with Bramman. She played an aspiring journalist, Gayathri opposite Sasikumar. The film emerged a box office average. Baradwaj Rangan was critical of the film and her character. In the same year, she played Radha Mohan's friend in Manam, alongside Naga Chaitanya, in the film's song "Kanulanu Thaake".

=== Rise to prominence and success (2015–2017) ===
Tripathi portrayed Nandana, a Kuchipudi dance teacher in love with an absent-minded plant scientist opposite Nani, in the 2015 film Bhale Bhale Magadivoy. A major commercial success and the eighth highest grossing Telugu film of the year, it turned out to be her breakthrough. Suresh Kavirayani noted, "Lavanya looks beautiful as Nandana and ticks all the boxes. Her chemistry with Nani is good on screen and she is one of the bright talents to look out for in future." A critic of Sify was appreciative of her "endearing" performance. Her performance earned her IIFA Utsavam Award for Best Actress – Telugu nomination and won her the Zee Telugu Apsara Award for Rising Star of the Year.

Following this, Tripathi had three commercial successes in 2016. She first portrayed a lonely wife Seetha in Soggade Chinni Nayana, opposite Nagarjuna. Sangeetha Devi Dundoo stated, "Lavanya comes up with yet another graceful and confident portrayal. She expresses the angst of a lonely wife well enough to draw empathy." The film was a commercial success and the seventh highest grossing Telugu film of the year. She received her first Filmfare Award for Best Actress – Telugu nomination and won Sakshi Excellence Award for Best Actress. She next played a cashier Devi in Lacchimdeviki O Lekkundi opposite Naveen Chandra. It received mixed reviews but was a commercial success. Her final release of the year came with Srirastu Subhamastu, where she played Ananya opposite Allu Sirish. A The Times of India critic stated that she lends a decent "support to the film" with her act. She received SIIMA Award for Best Actress – Telugu nomination for the film.

Tripathi had five film releases in 2017. She first appeared in Mister opposite Varun Tej, where she played Chandramukhi a shy village girl. Ch Sowmya Sruthi of The Times of India felt her character falls "flat" due to poor writing. She next played one of the titular character of a student Radha in Radha, opposite Sharwanand. Later, Tripathi appeared in Yuddham Sharanam. She played Anjali, a medical intern opposite Naga Chaitanya. Hemanth Kumar CR stated, "Chaitanya and Lavanya make a wonderful on-screen couple and their romantic sub-plot is a delight to watch." All these films emerged as box office averages. Following this, Tripathi portrayed Meghana a carefree wedding planner opposite Ram Pothineni, in Vunnadhi Okate Zindagi. Sangeetha Devi Dundoo noted, "Lavanya's character is a light-hearted one and the actor pulls it off well. It's a relief not to see her in those flowy lehengas she had become synonymous with." The film emerged a moderate success at the box office. In her last release of the year, she made her comeback to Tamil films with Maayavan. Tripathi played Dr. Aadhirai, a psychiatrist opposite Sundeep Kishan. The film emerged another moderate success. Manoj Kumar R was appreciative of her for playing her character well. All her 2017 performances earned her the Zee Cine Award Telugu for Popular Face of the Year.

=== Career fluctuations (2018–2022) ===
Tripathi started 2018 with Inttelligent opposite Sai Dharam Tej, where she played Shreya, a software engineer. In her next release Antariksham 9000 KMPH, she reunited with Varun Tej and played Parvathi, a school teacher. Neeshita Nyayapati opined that she delivers a "convincing performance". Both films underperformed at the box office. In 2019, Tripathi's only release was Arjun Suravaram. She played Kavya, an aspiring journalist opposite Nikhil Siddharth. The film was a major commercial success. Murali Krishna C H opined that she makes her presence felt through her performance.

Tripathi had two film releases in 2021. Her first release was A1 Express opposite Sundeep Kishan, where she played Lavanya, a hockey player. Sashidhar Adivi of Deccan Chronicle stated, "Lavanya is not the run-of-the-mill heroine and is an excellent choice for the role. Perhaps this is one of her best performances." She next played Mallika, a widow opposite Kartikeya Gummakonda in Chaavu Kaburu Challaga. Gabbeta Ranjith Kumar of The New Indian Express noted that she exhibits "good screen presence".

Tripathi portrayed dual characters of Happy and Baby in her only release of 2022, Happy Birthday. Mukesh Manjunath of Film Companion stated, "Lavanya is amazing and annoying as the protagonist but to even envision her in this role is a brave move. She relishes the part too even in the moments when she's not getting the comedy right."

=== Streaming projects and further work (2023–present) ===
Tripathi marked her streaming debut with Puli Meka in 2023. She played Kiran, an IPS officer opposite Aadi. Abhilasha Cherukuri was appreciative of her action sequences and added, "Lavanya takes the centre-stage in Puli Meka, something rare for mainstream Telugu cinema."

In 2024, Tripathi had her second web release with Miss Perfect opposite Abijeet. She played Lavanya, a management consultant obsessed with cleanliness and mistanken as a maid Laxmi. Sonal Pandya of Times Now noted, "Despite the craziness of the plot, Lavanya adds some vulnerability to her character and makes the series watchable."

In 2025, following an eight year hiatus, Tripathi returned to Tamil films with Thanal opposite Atharvaa. She played Anu, a police officer's lover. A critic of The Times of India found her to be "stuck in utility mode". Tripathi then played Leelavathi, an obsessive wife in the 2026 Telugu film Sathi Leelavathi opposite Dev Mohan. Shreya Varanasi noted, "Lavanya carries the film with confidence and brings emotional weight to Leela’s frustration and vulnerability."

== Personal life ==
Tripathi met actor Varun Tej, on the sets of their film Mister (2017) and eventually started dating him. They went on to work together in Antariksham 9000 KMPH in 2018. They got engaged on 9 June 2023 in Hyderabad. Tripathi married Tej on 1 November 2023 in Tuscany, Italy in a traditional ceremony. On 9 September 2025, Tripathi gave birth to their son Vaayuv.

== Off-screen work ==
Tripathi has worked for a number of causes. She took up the role of "Shiksha Superhero" for P&G Shiksha in Hyderabad. In 2018, she worked in an advertisement along with the Traffic Police Department of Telangana, for which she did not take any remuneration. Tripathi became the first Tollywood actress to donate for Government's Corona Crisis Charity, during COVID-19 in 2020. She stated that she felt "a sense of responsibility" and came forward to contribute to the country.

Tripathi collaborated with designer Anitha Reddy to produce washable, reusable masks for their collaborative initiative "Redtri". It also promoted Vocal for Local. She has also decided to start a nature cafe in Mussoorie. Tripathi has ramp walked at events and has been the cover model for magazine covers including Provoke Magazine and You and I's June edition. She is also known for her minimalistic and elegant fashion sense.

Tripathi landed in controversy post her outspoken tweet slamming Brahmin pride. She tweeted, "As a Brahmin, I don't understand this whole superiority feeling among some of the Brahmins. You become superior or inferior because of what you do, not because of your caste." She later deleted the tweet and said, "Deleted bcz i didnt want to hurt anybody's feelings while putting my point forward, as tweets can be misleading sometimes.. but i do believe in good acts than caste."

== Artistry and media image ==
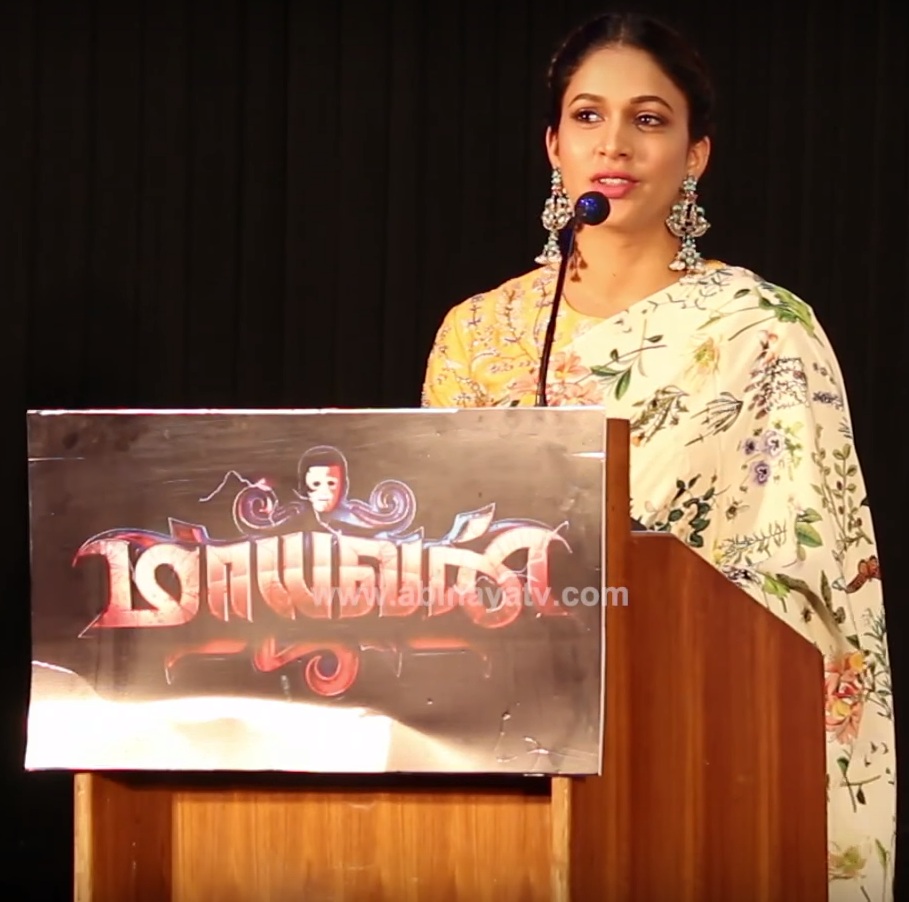
Tripathi at an event in 2017

Tripathi made a promising debut with Andala Rakshasi. Times of India noted, "Lavanya has a author backed role and does a great job of it. She has a very versatile face and the filmmaker utilized it to the hilt." Tripathi gained recognition with films, Bhale Bhale Magadivoy and Soggade Chinni Nayana. Suresh Kavirayani of Deccan Chronicle stated her as "one of the bright talents to look out for in future". Writer Pranitha Jonnalagedda compared her to actress Soundarya. NDTV's Rinku Gupta has termed Tripathi a "pretty and charming" actress.

Chiranjeevi praised her line of work in a 2019 event and said, "Lavanya Tripathi is a nice and cute girl. She looked very beautiful in Bhale Bhale Magadivoy. I was shocked after watching her on the screen. I just saw her for a while without blinking. She has done a good job in Arjun Suravaram as well. Lavanya has a bright future as she is well established in the South Indian film industry." Allu Arjun had even termed her a "lucky mascot". In a 2021 Interview with 123telugu, Tripathi termed Chaavu Kaburu Challaga as the "best script" of her career. On her acting approach, she said,

"After listening to a script, if I instantly feel like doing the film, I take it up. I want to be challenged as an actress and even do roles that are physically demanding if need be. I hope to even play character with negative shades someday".

Tripathi was placed 17th in Hyderabad Times Most Desirable Woman list of 2016. She is a celebrity endorser for several brands and products, including, Fair & Lovely and Binani Cement. She has also endorsed Tripura Herbal hair oil and Gold Winner oil. She collaborated with Amazon for their "Amazon Festive Stylebook" Episode 5 in 2021. Tripathi showed four different elegant festive looks for women along with style tips.

== Filmography ==
=== Films ===
Key
†	Denotes films that have not yet been released

Year	Title	Role	Notes	Ref.
2012	Andala Rakshasi	Midhuna		
2013	Doosukeltha	Dr. Alekhya / Chinni (Note: Tripathi played a single character with two or more names.)		
2014	Bramman	Gayathri	Tamil film	
2014	Manam	Radha Mohan's friend	Cameo appearance	
2015	Bhale Bhale Magadivoy	Nandana "Nandu" Rao		
2016	Soggade Chinni Nayana	Seetha		
2016	Lacchimdeviki O Lekkundi	Devi / Umadevi / Ankallamma		
2016	Srirastu Subhamastu	Ananya "Anu"		
2017	Mister	Chandramukhi		
2017	Radha	Radha		
2017	Yuddham Sharanam	Anjali		
2017	Vunnadhi Okate Zindagi	Meghana "Maggie"		
2017	Maayavan	Dr. Aadhirai	Tamil film	
2018	Inttelligent	Shreya		
2018	Antariksham 9000 KMPH	Parvathi "Paaru"		
2019	Arjun Suravaram	Kavya		
2021	A1 Express	Lavanya Rao		
2021	Chaavu Kaburu Challaga	Mallika		
2022	Happy Birthday	Pasupuleti Happy Tripati / Pasupuleti Baby Tripati (Note: Tripathi played dual roles in the film.)	Dual role	
2025	Thanal	Anu	Tamil film	
2026	Sathi Leelavathi	Leelavathi Sethu		

=== Television ===
Year	Title	Role	Language	Network	Notes	Ref.
2006–2009	Ssshhhh...Koi Hai	Unknown	Hindi	Star Plus	Episodic roles	
2008	Get Gorgeous 5	Contestant	Hindi	Channel V India	9th place	
2009–2010	Pyaar Ka Bandhan	Mishti Das / Araina Rai	Hindi	Sony TV		
2010	CID	Sakshi	Hindi	Sony TV	Episode: Maut Ka Aashirvad	
2016	Memu Saitham	Herself	Telugu	Gemini TV	Episode 20	
2023	Puli Meka	Kiran Prabha IPS	Telugu	ZEE5		
2024	Miss Perfect	Lavanya Rao / Lakshmi	Telugu	Disney+Hotstar		

=== Music videos ===
Year	Title	Role	Language	Singer(s)	Ref.
2021	"Pottum Pogattume"	Aisha	Tamil	Sathyajita Ravi & Jen Martin	

== Accolades ==
Year	Award	Category	Work	Result	Ref.
2013	CineMAA Awards	Best Female Debut	Andala Rakshasi	Won	
2013	Hyderabad Times Film Awards	Promising Newcomer – Female	Andala Rakshasi	Nominated	
2013	South Indian International Movie Awards	Best Female Debut – Telugu	Andala Rakshasi	Nominated	
2016	IIFA Utsavam	Best Actress – Telugu	Bhale Bhale Magadivoy	Nominated	
2016	Zee Telugu Apsara Awards	Rising Star of the Year	Bhale Bhale Magadivoy	Won	
2017	Filmfare Awards South	Best Actress – Telugu	Soggade Chinni Nayana	Nominated	
2017	Sakshi Excellence Awards	Most Popular Actress of the Year	Soggade Chinni Nayana	Won	
2017	Zee Cine Awards Telugu	Girl Next Door of the Year	Soggade Chinni Nayana	Won	
2017	South Indian International Movie Awards	Best Actress – Telugu	Srirastu Subhamastu	Nominated	
2018	Zee Cine Awards Telugu	Popular Face of the Year	—N/a	Won	

== See also ==
- List of Indian film actresses
- Konidela–Allu family
