= Sarkaru Vaari Paata =

2022 film directed by Parasuram

- Theatrical release poster
- Directed by: Parasuram
- Written by: Parasuram
- Produced by: Naveen Yerneni; Y. Ravi Shankar; Ram Achanta; Gopichand Achanta
- Starring: Mahesh Babu; Keerthy Suresh; Samuthirakani
- Cinematography: R. Madhi
- Edited by: Marthand K. Venkatesh
- Music by: Thaman S
- Production companies: Mythri Movie Makers; 14 Reels Plus Entertainment; G. Mahesh Babu Entertainment
- Release date: 12 May 2022
- Running time: 161 minutes
- Country: India
- Language: Telugu
- Box office: est.₹180−200 crores

Sarkaru Vaari Paata (transl. Government song) is a 2022 Indian Telugu-language action comedy drama film written and directed by Parasuram. It is produced by Mythri Movie Makers, 14 Reels Plus and G. Mahesh Babu Entertainment and stars Mahesh Babu, Keerthy Suresh and Samuthirakani in lead roles. The film follows a conflict between Mahi, a financier and MP named Rajendranath, after his daughter Kalaavathi cons Mahi for her gambling debts.

The film was announced in May 2020 with a formal launch ceremony taking place in November 2020. Principal photography begun in January 2021 in Dubai and later also took place in Hyderabad, but was put on hold in April 2021 due to the COVID-19 pandemic. Filming resumed in July 2021 and took place in Goa and Spain before ending in April 2022. The film score and soundtrack is composed by Thaman S with cinematography and editing by R. Madhi and Marthand K. Venkatesh respectively.

Initially set to release in January 2022, Sarkaru Vaari Paata was deferred due to the pandemic and production delays. It eventually had a theatrical release on 12 May 2022 and received mostly mixed to positive reviews from critics. The film grossed ₹180–230 crores worldwide becoming the second highest-grossing Telugu film of 2022.

== Plot ==
Mahesh "Mahi" is a finance agent, who has set up his own loan agency named Mahi Finance Corporation, in Miami, Florida. He turns his debtors' life into hell when they fail to repay their debts. Meanwhile, Mahi meets Kalavathi, who requests Mahi to loan her US$10K and later US$25K for her graduate studies. Mahi lends the loan and soon falls in love with Kalavathi. However, Mahi finds out that Kalavathi is a gambling addict and had tricked Mahi into asking for the loan. When confronted to repay the loan, she threatens Mahi by using the influence of her father, Rajendranath, a powerful MP, Rajya Sabha member and industrialist based in Visakhapatnam who runs an industrial company: Rajendranath Associates.

Mahi travels to Vizag to retrieve the money, which earns Rajendranath's wrath. Rajendranath gives him warning that he will not pay the loan and after unsuccessful murder attempt on Mahi, Rajendranath calls Mahi to his office and tells that he will repay the amount, but with condition, that Mahi should say that he was a scammer targeting rich families. Mahi agrees but instead, he grabs the attention of the media about the loan repayment and reveals that Rajendranath owes him ₹10,000 crore (US$1.1 billion), much to everyone's astonishment. Rajendranath confronts Mahi where he reveals his agenda: Before arriving in Vizag, Mahi learns from a senior State Bank official Rajakumari that Rajendranath had swindled the State Bank for ₹10,000 crore (US$1.1 billion) and had sealed down the bank for illegal laundering before she is arrested by the police. Mahi decided to recover the amount and also expose the fault lines that run deep within the Indian banking system. Mahi manages to serve a bank notice to Rajendranath, who is ordered to repay the debt.

Kalavathi finds out about Mahi's misdeeds, and with her uncle (Rajendranath's brother-in-law) plans to make Mahi withdraw the case, but to no avail. Rajendranath, with his political connections, manages to issue a stay order for the bank notice, from the Supreme Court. Kalavathi realizes her father's true colors, and extends her support to Mahi, renewing their relationship. Mahi, along with the people of his area decide to protest using the slogan Boycott Banks, against Rajendranath and the other banks involved in financial fraud with millionaires. Rajendranath is warned by the Finance Minister that he will be dismissed from the Ministerial post and Rajya Sabha. Rajendranath kidnaps Mahi, with the help of the Vizag ACP Ajay Kumar and orders Ajay to finish him off.

The next day, the bank officials find the ₹1 (1.1¢ US) seal in every bank lock. The henchmen inform Rajendranath, who tells his henchmen to attack the bank. It is revealed that the cops had helped Mahi escape from the encounter after they learned that he was doing the right thing. Mahi reaches the bank and defeats Rajendranath's henchmen. Rajendranath arrives at the bank, where the mob attacks Rajendranath, but Mahi saves him and makes Rajendranath realize the seriousness of his misdeeds. He apologizes to everyone and repays the ₹10,000 crore (US$1.1 billion) loan. The State Bank regains its reputation and Rajakumari is released from custody.

Rajakumari thanks Mahi and asks him about his origins. Mahi reveals that his parents took a loan of ₹15,000 (US$160) from the same bank 15 years ago and were unable to repay it on time, due to which they committed suicide. Mahi had forgiven the bank as they did their duty for collecting the loan and that the people must be blamed for not paying the amount in time. Mahi tells that the government has changed and that Sarkaru Vaari Paata must be made to the public sector and everyone.

== Cast ==
- Mahesh Babu as Mahesh "Mahi", founder of Mahi Finance Corporation
- Keerthy Suresh as Kalaavathi, Mahi's love interest
- Samuthirakani as MP Rajendranath, Kalaavathi's father (voice dubbed by P. Ravi Shankar)
- Nadhiya Moidu as Rajakumari, senior bank official (Cameo Appearance)
- Subbaraju as Subbaraju, Rajendranath's brother-in-law
- Vennela Kishore as Kishore, Mahi's friend
- Ajay as ACP Ajay Kumar
- Brahmaji as D. Brahmaji, operation manager of Bharathi State Bank, One Town Branch
- Tanikella Bharani as Master
- Posani Krishna Murali as colony president
- Mahesh Manjrekar as Finance Minister
- Ravi Prakash as Krishna Murthy, Assistant Manager of Bharathi State Bank, One Town Branch
- Prabhas Sreenu as recovery agent
- L. B. Sriram as sports minister
- Sowmya Menon as Sowmya, Kalavathi's friend
- Parag Tyagi as Goon from Bihar
- Satyam Rajesh as Rajesh, cab driver
- Rajasri Nair as Rajendranath's wife
- Mounica as Rajendranath’s family member
- Geeta Bhaskar as Master's wife
- Appaji Ambarisha Darbha as colony member
- Ananth Babu as colony member
- Naga Babu as Mahi's father
- Pavitra Lokesh as Mahi's mother

== Production ==
=== Development ===
"After watching Okkadu in 2003, I decided to venture into films and make a film with Mahesh Babu. Finally, after these many years, my dream is set to be fulfilled. In other words, this is my dream project and I will certainly make it count [...] With Mahesh's project, I am working on all the commercial ingredients that will satisfy his fans."

— Parasuram, on directing Mahesh Babu.

Following the success of Geetha Govindam (2018), the film's director Parasuram narrated a script to Mahesh Babu. Later, Parasuram began working on the Naga Chaitanya-starrer Nageswara Rao. The filming was delayed due to the COVID-19 pandemic, leading Parasuram to re-visit Babu's film. The project was officially confirmed during late-April 2020, with Parasuram stating it as a "dream come true" moment on directing Babu. Mythri Movie Makers and 14 Reels Plus in collaboration with Babu's home banner, G. Mahesh Babu Entertainment jointly funded the project. On 31 May 2020, on the occasion of Babu's father Krishna's birthday, the makers officially announced the project with the film being titled as Sarkaru Vaari Paata.

=== Cast and crew ===
Thaman S was signed to compose the music for the film in his fourth collaboration with Babu. The technical team of the film consists of cinematographer P. S. Vinod, editor Marthand K. Venkatesh and production designer A.S. Prakash. Vinod was eventually replaced by R. Madhi as the cinematographer, as he opted out due to schedule conflicts. In April 2020, Kannada film actor Upendra entered the talks to play a crucial role but it did not materialize. In June, Kiara Advani and Saiee Manjrekar were initially considered as the lead actress. However, in October, Keerthy Suresh was confirmed to play a lead role. In January 2021, Vennela Kishore and Subbaraju joined the production. Tamil film actor Samuthirakani was signed to play a pivotal role, and joined the film's production in September 2021.

=== Filming ===
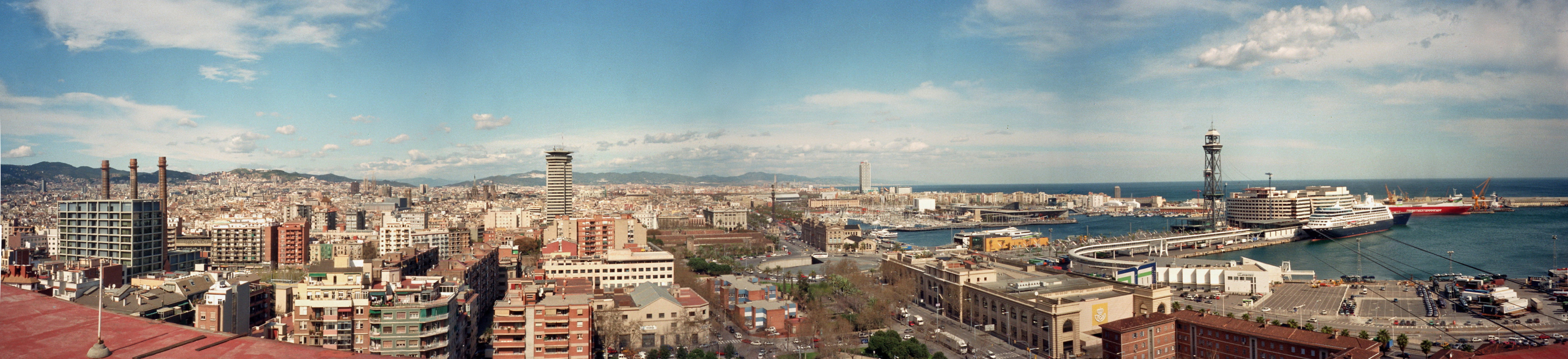
Part of the film was shot at Barcelona, Spain

In September 2020, Parasuram and his team went to United States, for a location scouting, in order to shoot the film. A formal launch event was held in Hyderabad on 21 November 2020, with the film's shooting might commence from 1 January 2021, and would primarily shot in the United States, Hyderabad and Dubai. However, principal shooting began on 25 January 2021 at Dubai.

The first filming schedule took place for four weeks at Mleiha (Sharjah), and was completed on 21 February 2021. The second schedule of the film commenced on 13 April 2021 in Hyderabad where two crucial scenes were planned to be shot. But, on 20 April, it was reported that the film's shooting being stalled after six crew members were tested positive for COVID-19. Shooting further delayed after night curfew and several restrictions being announced in Andhra Pradesh and Telangana, to control the rise in COVID-19 cases. The filming resumed in July 2021 in Hyderabad, where scenes featuring Babu and Suresh were shot for a month-long schedule. On 14 August 2021, the film's team headed to Goa for a primary schedule which consisted fight scenes choreographed by Ram Lakshman duo. In October 2021, a schedule took place in Spain and was wrapped up by the first week of November. Major portions of the film were shot indoors in massive sets designed by the art director A.S. Prakash.

Shoot of the film was halted as Babu underwent a knee surgery. A schedule was planned in January 2022 but was delayed as Babu tested positive for COVID-19. Final schedule of the film began in March 2022, at the Aluminum factory in Hyderabad. Action sequences in the climax featuring Babu were shot in this schedule. The shoot was completed in late April 2022.

== Music ==
Sarkaru Vaari Paata

Soundtrack album by Thaman S
- Released: 13 June 2022
- Recorded: 2021–2022
- Genre: Feature film soundtrack
- Length: 23:43
- Language: Telugu
- Label: Saregama
- Producer: Thaman

Thaman S chronology
Ghani (2022)	Sarkaru Vaari Paata (2022)	Thank You (2022)

Singles from Sarkaru Vaari Paata
- 1. "Kalaavathi" Released: 13 February 2022; 2. "Penny" Released: 20 March 2022; 3. "Sarkaru Vaari Paata Title Song" Released: 23 April 2022; 4. "Ma Ma Mahesha" Released: 7 May 2022; 5. "Sarkaru Vaari Paata Rap Song" Released: 13 May 2022; 6. "Murari Vaa" Released: 2 June 2022

The film score is composed by Thaman S, collaborating with Mahesh Babu for the fourth time after Dookudu, Businessman and Aagadu, with Parasuram for the third time after Anjaneyulu and Srirastu Subhamastu. The audio rights were acquired by Saregama. Music production of the film's soundtrack and score began on 20 September 2021. The first single titled "Kalaavathi" sung by Sid Sriram was scheduled to be released on 14 February 2022 coinciding with Valentine's Day but it was later preponed and released on 13 February 2022 due to the song being leaked online the day before. The second single titled "Penny" sung by Nakash Aziz was released on 20 March 2022.

Track listing
No.	Title	Lyrics	Singer(s)	Length
1.	"Kalaavathi"	Ananta Sriram	Sid Sriram	4:02
2.	"Penny"	Ananta Sriram	Nakash Aziz	4:39
3.	"Sarkaru Vaari Paata Title Song"	Ananta Sriram	Harika Narayan	2:36
4.	"Ma Ma Mahesha"	Ananta Sriram	Sri Krishna, Jonita Gandhi	4:06
5.	"Sarkaru Vaari Paata Rap Song"	MaaHaa	Harika Narayan, MaaHaa, Sravana Bhargavi, Manisha Eerabathini, Pratyusha Pallapothu, Sri Soumya Varanasi, Sruthi Ranjani	4:03
6.	"Murari Vaa"	Ananta Sriram	Sri Krishna, Sruthi Ranjani, M. L. Gayathri	4:17
Total length:				23:43

== Release ==
=== Theatrical ===
Sarkaru Vaari Paata was released on 12 May 2022. Earlier in January 2021, the film was announced to be released in January 2022 coinciding with the Sankranti festival. Later in July 2021, the release date was announced as 13 January 2022. However, in November 2021, the film was postponed to 1 April 2022 coinciding with the Ugadi festival. In January 2022, the release date was pushed back to 12 May 2022 due to production delays. On 31 May 2022, an additional song titled "Murari Vaa" was attached to the film in theaters.

=== Home media ===
The digital distribution rights were acquired by Amazon Prime Video. On 2 June 2022, Prime Video announced that the film was available for early access rentals at ₹199 for both prime and non-prime customers in India. The film was digitally streamed on Amazon Prime Video from 23 June 2022 in Telugu along with dubbed versions in Tamil and Malayalam.

== Reception ==
Sarkaru Vaari Paata received mixed to positive reviews from critics. While the direction, screenplay, editing and pace of the second half were criticised, the performances of Babu and Samuthirakani, Thaman's music, and the action sequences were praised. The first half of the film was also well received.

Balakrishna Ganeshan of The News Minute gave the film a rating of 3/5 stars and wrote "It is great to see Mahesh Babu shedding his macho image and wooing a woman in the film. Mahesh is a delight to watch in these scenes. His comic timing and dialogue delivery are on point". Neeshita Nyayapati of The Times of India gave the film a rating of 2.5/5 stars and wrote "Sarkaru Vaari Paata remains a half-baked commercial drama you can sit through mostly due to Mahesh and Keerthy performances". Janani K of India Today gave the film a rating of 2.5/5 stars and wrote "Sarkaru Vaari Paata could have been a solid commercial entertainer dealing with a relevant topic. However, Parasuram Petla's efforts fall short". Arvind V of Pinkvilla gave the film a rating of 2.5/5 stars and wrote "The film is watchable as long as it is watchable. The first half, despite the not-so-amusing rom-com track, works to an extent".

Calling it a "misfire", Manoj Kumar R of The Indian Express gave the film a rating of 2/5 stars. Sankeertana Varma of Firstpost gave the film a rating of 2/5 stars and wrote "Sarkaru Vaari Paata reeks of simplistic snobbery associated with any film naive enough to pretend that it can solve a systemic issue in less than thirty minutes as its hero is strong and handsome". Haricharan Pudipeddi of the Hindustan Times stated "Mahesh Babu offers something fresh in his latest film. If only Keerty Suresh could say the same. Sangeetha Devi Dundoo of The Hindu stated "This Mahesh Babu, Keerthy Suresh film gets weighed down by an overdrawn later half". Murali Krishna CH of Cinema Express gave the film a rating of 2.5/5 stars and wrote "Overall, Sarkaru Vaari Paata has many flaws and there's no doubt about it. But it benefits from Mahesh Babu's lovable performance, which makes one overlook so many of its problems.".

Jeevi Of Idlebrain rated the movie with 3/5 and mentioned The first half of the film is entertaining with a twist at the interval. The second half dwells into the core story of the film. It's about how the banking industry failed in loans and NPA section. Such a subject needs a lot of depth. Director Parasuram chooses to generalize it so that basic idea can be conveyed easily to the masses. Plus points are an energetic Mahesh Babu, love story, core story idea and emotional scenes in the 2nd half. On the flipside, the second half should have been handled convincingly. On the whole, Sarkaru Vaari Paata is a film that works on Mahesh Babu's charisma and the core identifiable story idea.

=== Box office ===
Sarkaru Vaari Paata grossed ₹185 crores worldwide in its theatrical run and became the third highest-grossing Telugu film of 2022. The film is estimated to a mass distributor share of ₹121.22 crore.

The film grossed ₹55 crore worldwide on its first day, earning a distributor share of ₹45.21 crore. It collected ₹105 crore (US$11 million) gross worldwide in 2 days, becoming the 7th film in the Babu's career to join the ₹100 crore club. The film grossed around ₹160 crore (US$17 million) in five days. Tracking portal Box Office India termed its performance "an average fare" with a domestic net collection of ₹100 crore in five days, while Indo-Asian News Service claimed it to be the fastest to collect ₹100 crore at the domestic box office for a film with Telugu-language version only.

In its first week, Sarkaru Vaari Paata grossed ₹151.75 crore (US$16 million)–₹175.30 crore (US$19 million) worldwide. The film grossed ₹185 crore (US$20 million) worldwide in 11 days.
