= Satruvu (disambiguation) =

Shatruvu (lit. 'enemy') may refer to:

- Sathruvu, a 1991 Indian Telugu-language crime thriller film
- Shatruvu (2013 film), an Indian Telugu-language thriller film

== See also ==
- Shathru (disambiguation)
