= IIFA Utsavam Award for Best Actor – Telugu =

Indian award for Telugu language films

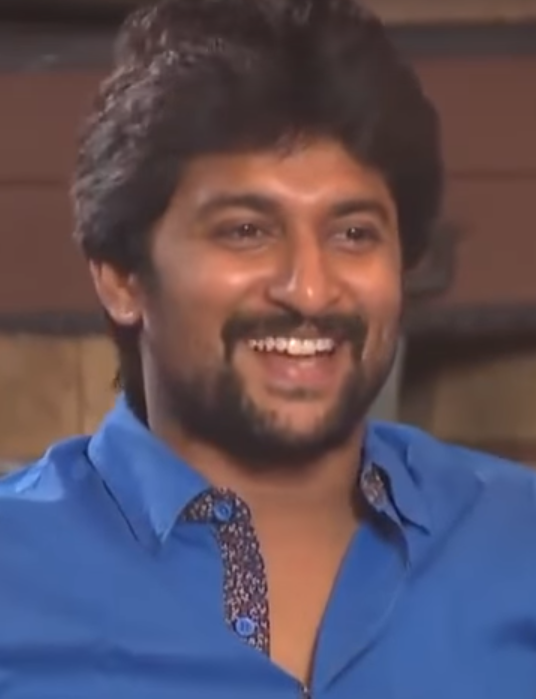
- The 2023 recipient: Nani
- Awarded for: Best Performance by an Actor in Leading Role in Telugu films
- Country: India
- First award: 2015
- Currently held by: Nani, Dasara (2023)

Highlights
- Most nominations: Nani (4)
- Website: iifautsavam.com

IIFA Utsavam Award for Best Actor – Telugu is given by the International Indian Film Academy in the South Indian segment which is known as IIFA Utsavam as part of annual ceremony for Telugu films. The award recognises a male actor who has delivered an outstanding performance in a leading role.

== Superlatives ==
Categories	Recipient	Record
Most nominations	Nani	4
Most nominations without a win	Allu Arjun	2
Most nominations without a win	Vijay Deverakonda	2

== Winners and nominees ==
Table key
‡	Indicates the winner

Year	Actor	Film	Ref.
2015 (1st)	Mahesh Babu ‡	Srimanthudu	
2015 (1st)	Allu Arjun	S/O Satyamurthy	
2015 (1st)	Nani	Bhale Bhale Magadivoy	
2015 (1st)	N. T. Rama Rao Jr.	Temper	
2015 (1st)	Prabhas	Baahubali: The Beginning	
2016 (2nd)	N. T. Rama Rao Jr. ‡	Janatha Garage	
2016 (2nd)	Allu Arjun	Sarrainodu	
2016 (2nd)	Nani	Krishna Gaadi Veera Prema Gaadha	
2016 (2nd)	Ram Charan	Dhruva	
2016 (2nd)	Vijay Deverakonda	Pelli Choopulu	
2023 (3rd)	Nani ‡	Dasara	
2023 (3rd)	Balakrishna	Bhagavanth Kesari	
2023 (3rd)	Dhanush	Sir	
2023 (3rd)	Nani	Hi Nanna	
2023 (3rd)	Naveen Polishetty	Miss Shetty Mr Polishetty	
2023 (3rd)	Vijay Deverakonda	Kushi	

== See also ==
- IIFA Utsavam Award for Best Actress – Telugu
