= IIFA Utsavam Award for Best Actress – Telugu =

Indian film award category

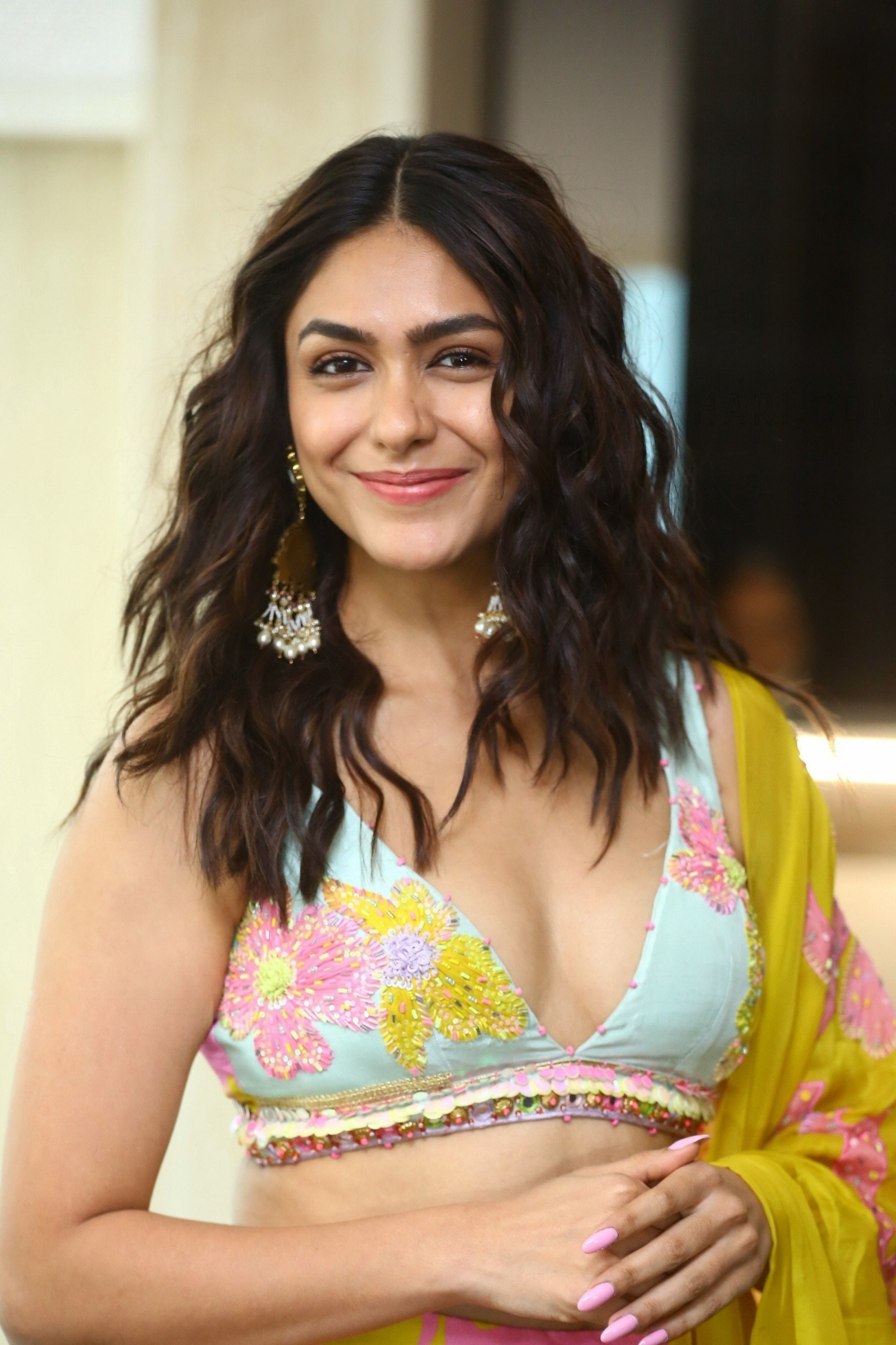
- The 2023 recipient: Mrunal Thakur
- Awarded for: Best Performance by an Actress in Leading Role in Telugu films
- Country: India
- First award: 2015
- Currently held by: Mrunal Thakur, Hi Nanna (2023)

Highlights
- Most nominations: Anushka Shetty (3)
- Website: iifautsavam.com

IIFA Utsavam Award for Best Actress – Telugu is given by the International Indian Film Academy in South Indian segment which is known as IIFA Utsavam as part of annual ceremony for Telugu films, to recognise a female actor who has delivered an outstanding performance in a leading role. The recipient is chosen by watchers and announced at the ceremony.

== Superlatives ==
Categories	Recipient	Record
Most nominations	Anushka Shetty	3
Most nominations without a win	Anushka Shetty	3

== Winners and nominees ==
Table key
‡	Indicates the winner

Year	Actress	Film	Ref.
2015 (1st)	Shruti Haasan ‡	Srimanthudu	
2015 (1st)	Lakshmi Manchu	Dongaata	
2015 (1st)	Lavanya Tripathi	Bhale Bhale Magadivoy	
2015 (1st)	Nithya Menen	Malli Malli Idi Rani Roju	
2015 (1st)	Tamannaah Bhatia	Baahubali: The Beginning	
2016 (2nd)	Samantha ‡	A Aa	
2016 (2nd)	Anushka Shetty	Rudhramadevi	
2016 (2nd)	Anushka Shetty	Size Zero	
2016 (2nd)	Pragya Jaiswal	Kanche	
2016 (2nd)	Ritu Varma	Pelli Choopulu	
2023 (3rd)	Mrunal Thakur ‡	Hi Nanna	
2023 (3rd)	Anushka Shetty	Miss Shetty Mr Polishetty	
2023 (3rd)	Keerthy Suresh	Dasara	
2023 (3rd)	Sreeleela	Bhagavanth Kesari	
2023 (3rd)	Vaishnavi Chaitanya	Baby	

== See also ==
- IIFA Utsavam Award for Best Actor – Telugu
