= Shatru =

Shatru may refer to:

- Shatru (1984 film), Indian Bengali-language film
- Shatru (1986 film), Indian Hindi-language film
- Shotru (2011 film), Indian Bengali-language film
- Shatru (2023 film), Bangladeshi film
- Shatru (actor) (born 1984), Indian film actor
- Shatru samharamurti, a form of the Hindu god of war, Kartikeya, as a vanquisher of enemies

== See also ==
- Shatru Sanghar, a 2009 Indian Odia-language film
- Shathru (disambiguation)
