= Shubh Nikah =

- Directed by: Arshad Siddiqui
- Screenplay by: Arshad Siddiqui
- Story by: Arshad Siddiqui
- Produced by: Bhupender Singh Sandhu, Arpit Garg
- Starring: Aksha Pardasany; Rohit Vikkram; Arsh Sandhu
- Cinematography: Ravi Bhat
- Edited by: Hardik Singh Reen
- Music by: Liyakat Ajmeri, Sunil Singh
- Production company: Arsh Sandhu Production
- Distributed by: Brandex Entertainment
- Release date: 17 March 2023
- Country: India
- Language: Hindi

Shubh Nikah (transl. "Auspicious marriage" or a "blessed Islamic wedding.") is an Indian 2023 Hindi language family drama film written and directed by Arshad Siddiqui.

The film stars Aksha Pardasany and Rohit Vikkram in the lead roles, with Arsh Sandhu and others appearing in supporting roles. It is scheduled for theatrical release on 17 March 2023.

== Plot ==
The story follows Munna Lal Mishra, a Hindu boy, and Zoya Khan, a Muslim girl, who fall deeply in love without realizing the challenges their relationship will bring. As their bond grows, they must face the weight of societal expectations. Only time will reveal whether these pressures will drive them apart or whether their love will ultimately be embraced by those around them.

== Cast ==
- Aksha Pardasany as Zoya Faraz
- Rohit Vikkram as Munna Lal Mishra
- Arsh Sandhu as Sabir Khan
- Govind Namdev as Shyama Lal Mishra
- Pankaj Berry as Sufiyan Rabbani
- Deepak Rana as SP Arjun Pratap Singh
- Ehsan Khan as Nasir Faraz
- Kunwar Aziz as Shamshad Faraz
- Gargi Patel as Shehnaz Beghum
- Rudrakshi as Khalajaan
- Liyakat Nasir as Mata Prasad Pandey

== Reception ==
Archika Khurana of The Times of India gave the movie 2.5/5 stars and wrote "In a nutshell, ‘Shubh Nikah’ may not be one of the best movies on intercaste love and marriage, but its heart is certainly in the right place". Einpresswire.com gave the movie good reviews and wrote "On the whole, Shubh Nikah is a good, easy watch with your family- Simple yet impactful!!!"
