= Yuvatha =

2008 film by Parasuram

- Directed by: Parasuram
- Produced by: Hari Tummala; Uma Prakash
- Starring: Nikhil Siddhartha; Aksha
- Cinematography: Jaswanth
- Edited by: Marthand K. Venkatesh
- Music by: Mani Sharma
- Distributed by: Worth Watching Entertainments
- Release date: 7 November 2008
- Country: India
- Language: Telugu
- Box office: ₹3.5 crore distributors' share

Yuvatha (transl. Youth) is a 2008 Indian Telugu-language action drama film directed by Parasuram in his directorial debut. The film stars Nikhil Siddhartha and Aksha in the lead roles. The music was composed by Mani Sharma with cinematography by Jaswanth and editing by Marthand K. Venkatesh. The film released on 7 November 2008 to positive reviews and was a commercial success.

== Plot ==
Babu (Nikhil Siddharth), an orphan raised by his uncle and aunt, believes that they have swindled his property. After an argument with his uncle, he leaves home and moves to Hyderabad to stay with his friends, whom he trusts. Babu is kindhearted and believes in spreading happiness. He accidentally meets Baby (Aksha), and they become good friends. Whenever she feels lonely, Babu and his three close friends—software engineer Ajay (Randhir Gattla), security guard Kiran (Utkam Rudhraksh), and assistant film director Subbu—cheer her up.

One day, during Baby’s birthday celebration, some goons harass her, and Babu confronts them. Later, they seek revenge, and in the ensuing clash, Subbu suffers severe injuries. The doctor demands ₹5 lakh for his surgery, prompting Babu to borrow money from a moneylender named Laddu (Narsing Yadav) on the condition that he repays it within a week. However, they fail to gather the required amount and request two more days. To arrange the money, Babu and Ajay attempt to rob a bank but get framed for a crime they did not commit. They suspect Kiran's involvement in setting them up and end up in jail.

While in prison, Babu befriends the jailer (Jaya Prakash Reddy) and a notorious criminal, Nannanna (Sayaji Shinde). Meanwhile, a gangster named Sonu Seth (Jeeva) intervenes and secures their release. Babu and his friends soon discover that a criminal named Nayeem was actually behind the bank robbery. Suspecting a link between Nannanna and Nayeem, Babu seeks his help, and Nannanna agrees. Eventually, the court rules that Nayeem is the real culprit.

Babu, Ajay, and Kiran surrender themselves along with the stolen money in court. However, since they had previously escaped from jail, they are sentenced to six months in prison. The film concludes on a happy note with the reunion of the four friends and Baby.

== Cast ==
- Nikhil Siddhartha as Veerababu "Babu"
- Aksha as Divya "Baby"
- Randhir Gattla as Ajay
- Utkam Rudhraksh as Kiran
- Sayaji Shinde as Nannanna
- Prakash Raj as Ghanta Babu
- Jaya Prakash Reddy as Jailer
- Narsing Yadav as Laddu
- Brahmanandam as Gandhi
- Jeeva as Sonu Seth
- Prudhviraj as Krishna Manohar
- Ravi Mariya as Nayeem
- Ravi Prakash as Doctor
- Srinivasa Reddy as Constable
- Shankar Melkote as Loan Agent
- Posani Krishna Murali as Home Minister
- Sivannarayana Naripeddi as House owner, Madhavi's father
- Krishnudu as Suribabu (special appearance)

== Soundtrack ==
Yuvatha

Soundtrack album by Mani Sharma
- Released: 21 August 2008
- Genre: Telugu
- Length: 23:27
- Label: Aditya Music
- Producer: Mani Sharma

Mani Sharma chronology
Parugu (2008)	Yuvatha (2008)	Hero (2008)

The music of Yuvatha was released on 21 August 2008 at Jouk Pub, Banjara Hills, Hyderabad. Aditya Music marketed the audio, with six songs. Producer and distributor Dil Raju released the audio CD and presented the first number to Hari, one of the producers. Bommarillu Bhaskar unveiled the audio cassette and gave it to director Parasuram.

The music and background score was composed by Mani Sharma and all the lyrics were penned by Krishna Chaitanya. The song "Eelesi Nuvvu" was a remake of Sharma's previous song "Aadungada Yennai Suththi" from Pokkiri (2007). The tune of the song "Yevarunnarani Neekaina" was reused by Sharma in Padikkadavan (2009) as "Kadavulum Kadhalum".

Track-List
No.	Title	Singer(s)	Length
1.	"Yuvatha Yuvatha"	Ranjith, Rahul Nambiar, Naveen	3:58
2.	"Yevarunnarani Neekaina"	Hemachandra, Harini	5:09
3.	"Eelesi Nuvvu"	Naveen	4:28
4.	"Kotikokatila Ammayi"	Ranjith, Rita	5:26
5.	"Maa Vooremo Cinna"	Murali, Malathi	4:26
Total length:			23:27

== Reception ==
A critic from 123telugu wrote that the film is a "decent entertainer and a good one time watch".
