= Shathru =

Shathru (lit. 'enemy') may refer to:

- Shathru (1985 film), an Indian Malayalam-language film
- Shathru (2013 film), an Indian Kannada-language film
- Sathru (2019 film), an Indian Tamil-language action thriller film

== See also ==
- Shatruvu (disambiguation)
- Shatru (disambiguation)
- Shotru, a 2011 Indian Bengali-language film
- Sathru (2019 film), an Indian Tamil-language film
- Sathrusamhaaram, a 1978 Indian Malayalam-language film
- Shatrughna, the brother of Rama in the ancient Indian epic Ramayana
