= Ranadhir Reddy =

Indian actor

- Occupation: Actor
- Years active: 2007–present

Ranadhir Reddy is an Indian actor working in Telugu cinema. He made his debut as an actor with Shekar Kammula's film Happy Days in 2007.

== Career ==
In 2007, Reddy attended an audition for a Sekhar Kammula's Happy Days in which Reddy played a haughty character. Reddy later acted in negative roles in several films including Mr. Medhavi, Yuvatha, Baanam, Pilla Zamindar, Aadu Magaadra Bujji, Adda and Subramanyam for Sale.

During this period, he made his lead debut with April Fool (2014) although it was marketed as a Jagapathi Babu-Bhumika Chawla starrer.

== Filmography ==
Year	Film	Role	Notes
2007	Happy Days	Naveen	
2008	Mr.Medhavi	Rakesh	
2008	Kantri	Kantri's friend	
2008	Yuvatha	Ajay	
2009	Baanam	Shakthi Patnaik	
2010	Om Shanti	Akbar	
2011	Mr Perfect	Vicky's friend	
2011	Vykuntapali	Michael	
2011	Pilla Zamindar	Ammiraju	
2011	Priyudu	Vara Prasad	
2013	Breakup	Vikky	
2013	Adda		
2013	Aadu Magaadra Bujji	Cherry	
2014	Basanti		
2014	Poga		
2014	April Fool	Kakki	Lead role
2015	Ramudu Manchi Baludu		
2015	Zindagi		
2015	Dhanalakshmi Thalupu Thadithe	Ranadhir	
2015	Subramanyam for Sale	Abhi	
2016	Dhruva	Karan IPS	
2016	Srirastu Subhamastu		
2016	Seethamma Andalu Ramayya Sitralu	Seethamalakshmi's brother	
2017	Showtime		
2019	Maharshi	Rahul	
2019	Kathanam	ACP Randhir	
2019	Sye Raa Narasimha Reddy	Narsi Reddy	
