= Puli Meka =

- Genre: Crime thriller
- Created by: Kona Venkat
- Story by: Venkatesh Kilaru
- Directed by: K. Chakravarthy Reddy
- Starring: Lavanya Tripathi; Aadi Saikumar
- Music by: Praveen Lakkaraju
- Country of origin: India
- Original language: Telugu
- No. of episodes: 8

Production
- Producers: Kona Venkat; Shravya Kona
- Cinematography: Ram K. Mahesan
- Editor: Chota K. Prasad
- Production company: Kona Film Corporation

Original release
- Network: ZEE5
- Release: 24 February 2023

Puli Meka is an Indian Telugu-language crime thriller series created by Kona Venkat story by Venkatesh Kilaru and directed by K. Chakravarthy Reddy. It stars Lavanya Tripathi and Aadi Saikumar in the lead roles. The series is produced by Kona Venkat under the Kona Film Corporation (KFC) banner, with music by Praveen Lakkaraju, cinematography by Ram K Mahesh, and editing by Chota K Prasad. It follows a serial killer on a cop-killing spree which rattles the police department. The series premiered on ZEE5 on 24 February 2023.

== Cast ==
- Lavanya Tripathi as Kiran Prabha IPS
- Aadi Saikumar as Dr. Prabakar Sharma, a forensic expert and Kiran's future husband
- Suman as Commissioner Anurag Narayan
- Goparaju Ramana as Diwakar Sharma, Prabakar's and Karuna's father
- Raja Chembolu as Karunakar Sharma, Prabakar's elder brother.
- Siri Hanumanthu as Pallavi, a former chess champion and Kiran's best friend.
- Srinivas as Panduranga Rao, Kiran's father a former IAS
- Spandhana Palli as Swetha
- Noel Sean as Riyaaz
- Mayank Parakh as Emmanuel

== Release ==
The trailer of the series was released by actor Ram Charan on 17 February 2023.

== Episodes ==
=== Season 1 ===
| No. | Title | Directed by | Written by | Original release date |
|---|---|---|---|---|
| 1 | "The Hunt Begins" | Chakravarthy Reddy | Kona Venkat, Venkatesh Kilaru | 24 February 2023 |
Police officer Kiran Prabha is assigned the case of a serial killer who targets police officers. Forensic expert Prabhakar Sharma also gets appointed to the case.
| 2 | "Case Closed?" | Chakravarthy Reddy | Kona Venkat, Venkatesh Kilaru | 24 February 2023 |
Prabhakar Sharma has a crush on Kiran and tries to find ways to express his feelings. In the meantime, the prime suspect gets captured. Another police officer is killed. Who's the culprit?
| 3 | "Killer in Disguise" | Chakravarthy Reddy | Kona Venkat, Venkatesh Kilaru | 24 February 2023 |
The investigation team learns that the killer poses himself as an animal. On the other hand, Prabhakar confronts his elder brother Karunakar, who lets him know that he has abandoned the family.
| 4 | "The Twist" | Chakravarthy Reddy | Kona Venkat, Venkatesh Kilaru | 24 February 2023 |
The department is stunned when the disguised serial killer assaults Kiran. Prabhakar realises who the real culprit is!
| 5 | "Kiran's Past" | Chakravarthy Reddy | Kona Venkat, Venkatesh Kilaru | 24 February 2023 |
Kiran's past uncovers the occurrences that have made her the revengeful police officer that she is today. However, the memories of a dear friendship help her in getting by.
| 6 | "A Parallel Investigation" | Chakravarthy Reddy | Kona Venkat, Venkatesh Kilaru | 24 February 2023 |
Karunakar has a moment of epiphany while he sees his dad's prominence and regard in society. Chief Narayan parallelly begins an investigation with suspended encounter specialist, Emmanuel.
| 7 | "Justice" | Chakravarthy Reddy | Kona Venkat, Venkatesh Kilaru | 24 February 2023 |
A series of kidnappings and interrogations lead to a shocking revelation about the story of a girl, Pallavi, who is cornered for objecting to the use of narcotics at a party.
| 8 | "The Next Target" | Chakravarthy Reddy | Kona Venkat, Venkatesh Kilaru | 24 February 2023 |
Emmanuel exits the case after imparting a couple of signs to the commissioner. His investigation uncovers the commissioner to be the next target. Will the culprit be caught before it's past the point of no return?

== Reception ==
=== Critical response ===
Abhilasha Cherukuri of The Indian Express in her review stated "Puli Meka leaves people with an exciting cliffhanger in the end, and the series will continue to have a winning run as long as it keeps its stakes high and twists sharp."

Kota Saumya of Telangana Today stated "Suspenseful thrillers rely heavily on the music to create an exciting vibe but the music by Praveen Lakkaraju is nothing noteworthy. However, as far as weekend watching goes, ‘Puli Meka’ is a good bet."

Neeshita Nyayapati at The Times of India wrote "Puli Meka is an eight-episode-long series that gets off on a shaky start and finds its footing as it progresses, but it's not enough."
