= Lacchimdeviki O Lekkundi =

- Promotional poster
- Directed by: Jagadish Talasila
- Story by: Jagadish Talasila
- Produced by: Sai Prasad Kamineni
- Starring: Lavanya Tripathi; Naveen Chandra
- Cinematography: Eshwar Yellumahanthi
- Edited by: Kotagiri Venkateswara Rao
- Music by: M. M. Keeravani
- Production company: Mayukha Creations
- Distributed by: KFC entertainments
- Release date: 29 January 2016
- Running time: 111 minutes
- Country: India
- Language: Telugu

Lacchimdeviki O Lekkundi (transl. Lacchimdevi has a calculation), also known by its initialism LOL, is a 2016 Indian Telugu-language comedy thriller film directed by debutant Jagadish Talasila. It stars Lavanya Tripathi and Naveen Chandra with music composed by M. M. Keeravani. The film is produced under Mayukha Creations banner by Sai Prasad Kamineni.

The film released on 29 January 2016 in 300 screens. It received mixed reviews from the critics, but was a commercial success.

== Plot ==
Devi (Lavanya) works in a bank as cashier, and is very smart. Naveen (Naveen Chandra) works in the same bank at the help desk and likes her. Naveen wants to become rich in life and agrees to a gang's plan to steal the data of unclaimed accounts. Apart from the bank's manager, only Devi has access to this data. He impresses her and gets close to her. One day he steals the data and hands it over to the gang headed by Mahesh (Ajay). Using the details in the data, Mahesh wants to claim them. Then he makes a plan to claim the unclaimed accounts. Mahesh and his girlfriend represent themselves as legal heirs of the holders of unclaimed accounts; Ankallamma and Umadevi and try to claim the full amount. After cheques were issued, bank manager Somayajulu (Jayaprakash Reddy) reveals that Ankallamma is a goddess; the unclaimed account of Ankallamma is the temple trust's money, and Umadevi is a wealthy unmarried child of a landlord, she killed herself due to a love failure with a classical singer. Due to these facts, he catches them red-handed and bangs them out. Then it is revealed that Naveen and Somayajulu joined hands to rob the entire amount. After tricking them, Somayajulu takes complete powers to access data from Devi on the reason of negligence of duty and publicly insults Devi. After completion of work Somayajulu cheats Naveen and blackmails him. Then Naveen realises his mistake in the lust for money and waits for a time to teach a lesson to Somayajulu. Then at one night in Somayajulu's house, Somayajulu sees Ankallamma. She demands her money back, seeing the weird circumstances, frightened Somayajulu promises to give her money back. Then Umadevi comes to Naveen's house, possesses Devi's body and tortures him with her bulky voice claims her amount then Naveen tells the full story to Umadevi and escapes from her. Then Umadevi and Ankallamma possess Devi and torture Somayajulu again. They set the condition to give the amount in a particular place. Later it is revealed that Devi is acting like Ankallamma and Umadevi because Mahesh informed her of Somayajulu's intentions. He lies to Devi that he is a journalist working to reveal the scam in the bank, that's why they played the game, but it went in vain. Then Devi believes them and collaborates with Mahesh. According to Mahesh's plan, Devi acted as Ankallamma and Umadevi. Mahesh plans to grab the entire amount again with the help of Devi. Naveen get suspicious of Devi's actions then follows her and understands the entire situation. Then he makes a plan to save money from all thieves. The next day in the bank with some comical circumstances Naveen saves money successfully and reveals the real natures of Mahesh and Somayajulu in front of the bank and Devi. Then while escaping, Somayajulu and Mahesh die in a police shoot out. After that, Devi accepts Naveen's marriage proposal.

== Cast ==
- Lavanya Tripathi as Devi
- Naveen Chandra as Naveen
- Jaya Prakash Reddy as Somayajulu
- Ajay as Mahesh
- Brahmaji
- Ayyappa P. Sharma
- Sampoornesh Babu
- Sufi Sayyad
- Shankar Melkote
- Karun in a guest appearance

== Soundtrack ==
The music was composed by M. M. Keeravani.

- "Maskesko" - Mohana Bhogaraju
- "Mayukha"
- "Crazy"
- "Ankalamma, Umadevi" - Mohana Bhogaraju,
- "Lacchimdevi Dhandakam"
- "Umadevi Music Practice"
