= April Fool (2014 film) =

2014 film

- Directed by: Krishnaswamy Shrikanth Iyengar
- Written by: Balabadrapatruni Madhu
- Produced by: Seema Azaruddin; GL Srinivas
- Starring: Ranadhir Reddy; Srushti Dange; Jagapathi Babu; Bhumika Chawla
- Cinematography: Tanikella Rajendra Prasad
- Music by: Dr Panti
- Production companies: Kartaal Productions; Sudha Entertainments
- Release date: 10 May 2014
- Country: India
- Language: Telugu

April Fool is a 2014 Indian Telugu-language comedy film directed by Krishnaswamy Shrikanth Iyengar and starring Ranadhir Reddy and Srushti Dange with Jagapathi Babu and Bhumika Chawla in supporting roles. The film was released on 10 May 2014.

Jagapathi Babu and Bhumika Chawla were falsely promoted as the film's lead actors.

== Cast ==
- Ranadhir Reddy as Kakki
- Srushti Dange as Satya
- Jagapathi Babu as Prakash (extended cameo appearance)
- Bhumika Chawla as Swapna (extended cameo appearance)
- Gulshan Grover
- Rallapalli
- Prudhvi Raj
- Vizag Prasad
- Thagubothu Ramesh
- Dhanraj
- Satyam Rajesh
- Seenu

== Production ==
The film was shot in forty-six days.

== Reception ==
A critic from The Times of India wrote that "The film, we were told, was going to be an absurd comedy. It's only half true...the absurd part that is". A critic from India Herald wrote that "If you are not bothered by bad screenplay and acting, love Bhumika Chawla and have money to spend this weekend then go watch April Fool".
