= Parasuram (director) =

Indian screenwriter and director

- Born: Cherlopalem, Andhra Pradesh, India
- Other name: Bujji
- Education: Andhra University & Jawahar Navodaya Vidyalaya
- Occupations: Film director; screenwriter
- Years active: 2003–present
- Relatives: Puri Jagannadh (cousin)

Parasuram is an Indian film director and screenwriter who works in Telugu cinema. Parasuram began his career in the film industry as an assistant director to his cousin Puri Jagannadh and later to Bhaskar. He made his directorial debut in 2008 with the film Yuvatha. Then, he went on to direct Anjaneyulu (2009), Solo (2011), Srirastu Subhamastu (2016), Geetha Govindam (2018), and Sarkaru Vaari Paata (2022).

== Early life ==
Parasuram was born in Cherlopalem of Visakhapatnam district, Andhra Pradesh. He has done his schooling from Jawahar Navodaya Vidhyalaya and completed his MBA degree in Andhra University before pursuing a career in films. He is also known as Bujji.

== Career ==
After completing his MBA degree in 2002, Parasuram started working as an assistant director to his cousin Puri Jagannadh. He worked as an assistant director for Puri Jagannadh on films like Itlu Sravani Subramanyam (2001), Andhrawala (2004), and 143 (2004). He also worked as an associate director to Bommarilu Bhaskar on the 2008 film Parugu.

His debut film was Yuvatha starring Nikhil Siddharth in 2008. His next film Anjaneyulu, a comedy entertainer starring Ravi Teja was released in 2009 and received mixed reviews from the critics and was an average grosser at the box office.

In 2011, he made the film Solo starring Nara Rohit, which earned a good gross at the box office. In 2012, he collaborated with Ravi Teja again for the film Sarocharu. The film received negative reviews from critics and was a box office failure.

In 2018, he made his next directional venture Geetha Govindam starring Vijay Devarakonda and Rashmika Mandanna. The film received mostly positive reviews from the critics and audiences and became one of the highly successful Telugu films of the year.

== Filmography ==
Key
†	Denotes films that have not yet been released

List of Parasuram film credits
Year	Title
2008	Yuvatha
2009	Anjaneyulu
2011	Solo
2012	Sarocharu
2016	Srirastu Subhamastu
2018	Geetha Govindam
2022	Sarkaru Vaari Paata
2024	The Family Star
