= Aksha Pardasany =

Indian actress (born 1991)

- Occupations: Film actress; model
- Years active: 2004 (Child artist), 2007–present
- Spouse: Kaushal Shah (m. 2024)

Aksha Pardasany is an Indian actress who primarily works in Telugu films and Hindi web series. She made her debut in Malayalam with Goal (2007) and gained recognition in Telugu with films such as Yuvatha (2008), Ride (2009), and Kandireega (2011).

== Personal life ==
Aksha hails from a Sindhi background. She attended the Bombay Scottish School, Mahim, where she completed her 12th standard.

Recently, Aksha Pardasany married cinematographer Kaushal Shah.

== Career ==
During her 8th class year she began modeling and has since acted in approximately 75 commercials. She made her debut in the Malayalam film Goal, where the director Yuvatha spotted her and signed her for one of the lead roles in his films. She finished working on Goal while she was in the 10th class. She appeared as a guest in a song for a Malayalam film titled Bangles.

After a span of two years, she appeared in the Telugu film Bengal Tiger in a cameo role.

Aksha got into collaboration with a US-based fashion brand Yog The Label. They sell her photos featuring products manufactured in USA and Europe worldwide.

== Filmography ==
=== As actress ===
List of films and roles
| Year | Title | Role | Language | Notes | Ref. |
|---|---|---|---|---|---|
| 2004 | Musafir | Young Sam | Hindi | Child artist | |
| 2007 | Goal | Neethu | Malayalam | Debut film in lead role | |
| 2008 | Yuvatha | Visalakshi a.k.a. Baby | Telugu | | |
| 2009 | Ride | Pooja | Telugu | | |
| 2010 | Adi Nuvve | Sameera | Telugu | | |
| 2011 | Kandireega | Sandhya | Telugu | Nominated – Filmfare Award for Best Supporting Actress – Telugu | |
| 2013 | Satruvu | Anusha | Telugu | | |
| 2013 | Rye Rye | Lakshmi | Telugu | | |
| 2013 | Bangles | | | | |
| 2013 | Goliyon Ki Raasleela Ram-Leela | | Hindi | Cameo appearance | |
| 2014 | Salim | Nisha | Tamil | Dubbed into Telugu as Dr. Salim | |
| 2015 | Bengal Tiger | | Telugu | Cameo appearance | |
| 2016 | Dictator | Shruti | Telugu | Supporting role | |
| 2016 | Mental Police | | Telugu | | |
| 2017 | Radha | Rukmini "Rukku" | Telugu | Extended cameo appearance | |
| 2017 | Love You Family | Khushi | Hindi | | |
| 2023 | Shubh Nikah | Zoya Faraz | Hindi | | |
| 2024 | Kartam Bhugtam | Jia | Hindi | | |

=== Web series ===
List of web series and roles
| Year | Title | Role | Platform | Notes |
|---|---|---|---|---|
| 2020- 2022 | Jamtara – Sabka Number Ayega | SP Dolly Sahu | Netflix | 2 Seasons |
| 2021 | Kathmandu Connection | Shivani Bhatnagar | SonyLIV | 2 Seasons |
| 2023 | Rafuchakkar | Shaurya | JioCinema | |
