= Love You Family =

Love U Family
- Directed by: Sachindra Sharma
- Screenplay by: Sachindra Sharma and Shahid Khan
- Story by: Vipul Devani
- Produced by: Khushi Motion Pictures; D S Bhatia. Vipul Diwani
- Starring: Salman Yusuff Khan; Aksha Pardasany; Sunil Gupta; Rima Mishra; Kashyap Barbhaya; Shakti Kapoor; Manoj Joshi
- Music by: Tannmay Pahwa
- Release date: 9 June 2017
- Country: India
- Language: Hindi

Love U Family is an Indian family-drama film, presented by Bharat Shah written and directed by Sachindra Sharma and produced by Vipul Diwani and D S Bhatia under the banner of Khushi Motion pictures. Screenplay by Sachindra Sharma and Shahid Khan . The film stars Salman Yusuff Khan, Aksha Pardasany and Kashyap in lead roles while Shakti Kapoor and National Award-winning actor Manoj Joshi will also be seen in the film. The film was released on 9 June 2017.

== Cast ==
- Salman Yusuff Khan as Raj
- Sunil Gupta as Sunil Gupta
- Rima Mishra as Rama
- Aksha Pardasany as Khushi
- Kashyap Barbhaya as Avi
- Manoj Joshi as Dhiren Devani
- Shakti Kapoor as Lovely Singh

== Music ==
1. "Ishq Ne Aisa Shunk Baja Ya" - Sonu Nigam, Madhushree
2. "Love U Family" - Madhushree, Vikrant Singh, Mridul Ghosh, Soumya, Robby Badal
3. "Maa" - Madhushree
4. "Naughty Naughty Party" - Naresh Iyer, Vishnu Narayan
5. "Peg Sheg" - Daler Mehndi, Kalpana Patowary, Vishnu Narayan
6. "Sar Se Paon Tak" - Prathamesh Tambe
7. 'Tune Chhua - Baras Jaa" - Zubin Garg, Meghna Yagnik
