= Radha (2017 film) =

2017 film

- Directed by: Chandra Mohan
- Screenplay by: Chandra Mohan
- Story by: Chandra Mohan
- Produced by: B. V. S. N. Prasad; Bhogavalli Bapineedu
- Starring: Sharwanand; Lavanya Tripathi; Aksha Pardasany
- Cinematography: Karthik Gattamneni
- Edited by: Kotagiri Venkateswara Rao
- Music by: Radhan
- Production company: Sri Venkateswara Cine Chitra
- Release date: 12 May 2017
- Running time: 126 minutes
- Country: India
- Language: Telugu
- Box office: ₹27 crore

Radha is a 2017 Indian Telugu-language action comedy film written and directed by Chandra Mohan, making his debut. The film which tells the story of Lord Krishna in modern times, is produced by Bhogavalli Bapineedu under Sri Venkateswara Cine Chitra. The film features Sharwanand and Lavanya Tripathi in lead roles along with Aksha Pardasany in an extended cameo role. Ravi Kishan, Ashish Vidyarthi, and Kota Srinivasa Rao play supporting roles. The score and soundtrack is composed by Radhan and cinematography is by Karthik Ghattamneni. The film released on 12 May 2017.

The film was a commercial success.

== Plot ==
Radha Krishna (Sharwanand) grows up admiring Lord Krishna. He does not miss any chance to know about Krishna and his stories of protecting Dharma. An incident makes him believe that he can help people in need by becoming a police officer just like Krishna did. After completing his studies, he helps the police bust a gang and gets a police job with special permission. Radha Krishna completes his training in Hyderabad and gets posted to a small village with a 0% crime rate in Warangal district. He feels unhappy in the beginning that he had not gotten any adventurous work that he had always dreamt of, but he later sees a girl named Radha (Lavanya Tripathi) and tries to win her heart.

Meanwhile, the home minister (Ashish Vidyarthi) of the state wants to become a chief minister and tries to influence the party observer and current chief minister (Kota Srinivasa Rao). However, the party observer declares his aide MLA Sujatha (Ravi Kishan) as a candidate for the post of Chief Minister, a very honest leader. On the other end, Radha Krishna gets transferred to the old city, Hyderabad. Suddenly, bomb blasts occur in Sujatha's election campaign. In the bomb blast, Radha Krishna loses his colleagues and promises to take revenge on the responsibility for the bomb blasts. It is then revealed that those bomb blasts were planned by Sujatha himself to gain sympathy from the people as an aspirant for the Chief Minister position.

Meanwhile, due to Radha Krishna's unpredictable actions, Sujatha gets suspicious on Radha and promotes him to his personal security. In the course of events, it is revealed by his henchmen that Radha Krishna is well-aware of Sujatha's plans and actions. Then after some comical sequences and fights, Radha Krishna reveals Sujatha's true nature in the public. Sujatha gets run over in a stampede and dies. Radha Krishna concludes with a message that the public must respect the police as it is them that protect and maintain the good in the society just like Lord Krishna did during his entire life. The film ends with Radha Krishna again getting transferred to another place.

== Cast ==
- Sharwanand as SI Radha Krishna
- Lavanya Tripathi as Radha
- Aksha Pardasany as Rukmini "Rukku"
- Ravi Kishan as Minister Sujatha
- Ashish Vidyarthi as Home Minister
- Kota Srinivasa Rao as Party Observer/Chief Minister
- Tanikella Bharani as Radha Krishna's father
- Pragathi as Radha Krishna's mother
- Shakalaka Shankar as Constable Pardhu
- Ali as Dr. DNA
- Saptagiri as Giri R
- Brahmaji as Constable Rahim Bhai
- Aditi Myakal as Sound Engineer near Sujatha
- Jaya Prakash Reddy as Acharya Deva
- Gautam Raju as Police Officer
- Duvvasi Mohan as Police Officer
- Mukhtar Khan as D.G.P
- Fish Venkat as Sujatha's henchman
- Amit Tiwari as Sujatha's henchman
- Ambati Srinivas as Thief

== Soundtrack ==
Radha

Film score by Radhan
- Released: 2017
- Recorded: 2017
- Genre: Soundtrack
- Label: Times Music
- Producer: Radhan

Radhan chronology
Darling 2 (2016)	Radha (2017)	Arjun Reddy (2017)

The music is composed by Radhan and was released on Times Music Company.

No.	Title	Lyrics	Singer(s)	Length
1.	"Rabbit Rabbit Pilla"	Sri Mani	Ramee
2.	"Choopultho"	KK	Ranjith
3.	"Kaakhi Chokka"	Suresh Banisetty	M. L. R. Karthikeyan, Ramee
4.	"Oye Mera Krishnuu"	Ramajogayya Sastry	Priya Himesh, Sameera Bharadwaj, Jithin Raj

== Release ==
The film was dubbed and released in Tamil as Nerukkadi. It was also dubbed in Hindi as Jurmana.
