= Srirastu Subhamastu =

- Theatrical release poster
- Directed by: Parasuram
- Written by: Parasuram
- Produced by: Allu Aravind
- Starring: Allu Sirish; Lavanya Tripathi; Prakash Raj; Rao Ramesh; Tanikella Bharani; Subbaraju
- Cinematography: S. Manikandan
- Edited by: Marthand K. Venkatesh
- Music by: S. Thaman
- Production company: Geetha Arts
- Release date: 5 August 2016
- Running time: 134 minutes
- Country: India
- Language: Telugu
- Budget: ₹7.1 crore
- Box office: est.₹20.2 crore

Srirastu Subhamastu is a 2016 Indian Telugu-language romantic comedy film directed by Parasuram and produced by Allu Aravind for Geetha Arts banner. The film features Allu Sirish and Lavanya Tripathi in the lead roles alongside Prakash Raj, Rao Ramesh, Tanikella Bharani, Subbaraju, Sumalatha, and Ali in the supporting roles, while Hamsa Nandini appears in an item song. The film opened to mixed to positive reviews and went on to become a commercial success at the box office. The core plot of this movie was heavily inspired by the 2014 Kannada movie Bahaddur.

== Plot ==
Sirish falls in love with Ananya / Anu. He goes to her as a common man where he says that he "lost his purse" and says that she has to help him get his identity, as when he was beating goons for his purse Anu stops him. One day Anu's friend finds his purse in his back-pack. Sirish reveals to her friend that he is rich and his dad Krishna Mohan said that if Anu fell in love with Sirish without knowing he's rich they would get married. But if she didn't, he would marry a girl of his father's choice. Soon Anu falls in love with Sirish and when she's about to propose, her father says that her godparents would wish that Anu would marry their son Arun. Not wanting to hurt their feelings she accepts. Then Sirish goes to Anu's home in a village to make Anu confess her feelings to him and choose to marry Srish with the help of Shyam Sundar, a marriage broker. And then finally Anu's father learns of Sirish's love and asks him whether his family can take good care of Anu. Sirish realizes even if he marries Anu, she would be treated like an outsider like his sister-in-law and Sirish tells his father about the talk with Anu's Dad. Sirish's father talks to Anu's father and tells them about Sirish's real identity and promises that he changed and realized that his thoughts were wrong and will treat his daughters-in-law as his own daughters from now on. The film ends with Sirish and Anu's marriage.

== Cast ==
- Allu Sirish as Sirish / Siri
- Lavanya Tripathi as Ananya / Anu
- Prakash Raj as Krishna Mohan, Sirish's father
- Rao Ramesh as Jagannatham, Anu's father
- Tanikella Bharani as Anu's would-be father-in-law
- Subbaraju as ACP Anand
- Sumalatha as Sirish's mother
- Ali as Shyam Sundar
- Ravi Prakash as Siva, Sirish's brother
- Pragathi as Anu's would-be mother-in-law
- Randhir Gattla
- Hamsa Nandini (special appearance) as Nandhini
- Eden Kuriakose as Siva's lover
- Vajja Venkata Gridhar

== Soundtrack ==
Srirastu Subhamastu

Soundtrack album by S. Thaman
- Released: 21 July 2016
- Recorded: 2016
- Genre: Soundtrack
- Length: 13:01
- Label: Lahari Music
- Producer: S. Thaman

S. Thaman chronology
Chuttalabbai (2016)	Srirastu Subhamastu (2016)	Thikka (2016)

The music was composed by S. Thaman and released by Lahari Music. The song "Desi Girl" is based on the song of the same name from Saagasam.

Track-List
No.	Title	Lyrics	Singer(s)	Length
1.	"Srirastu Subhamastu"	Ananta Sriram	Krishna Chaitanya, Javed Ali, Rahul Nambiar	4:11
2.	"Anu Anu"	Sri Mani	S. Thaman, Yazin Nizar, Shreya Ghoshal	4:28
3.	"Desi Girl"	Bhaskarabhatla Ravi Kumar	Revanth, Simha, Jonita Gandhi	4:22
Total length:				13:01

== Critical reception ==
Suresh Kavirayani of Deccan Chronicle wrote, "To sum up, Srirastu Subhamastu is a routine story with some regular scenes, but it is a decent effort from the director. The second half is entertaining and the pre-climax is good." Pranita Jonnalagedda of The Times of India rated the film 2.5/5 stars and wrote, "Srirastu Subhamastu might be good in parts but as a package it fails to create an impact." Suhas Yellapantula of The New Indian Express gave it 2/5 stars and wrote, "With needless emotions, lacklustre love story and an awfully predictable climax, Srirastu Subhamastu is a complete yawn-fest. Watch it at your own risk."
