= Shatru samharamurti =

Aspect of Hindu deity Kartikeya

Shatru samharamurti (Sanskrit: शत्रु संहारमूर्ति, romanized: Śatru saṃhāramūrti) is an aspect of the Hindu deity Kartikeya, called Murugan in Tamil tradition.

== Iconography ==
In his aspect of shatru samharamurti, Kartikeya is depicted with six faces and twelve hands and riding his peacock mount. He bears his attributes of the divine spear called the Vel and his rooster flag, and is often portrayed as slaying the asura Surapadman.

== Shatru samhara puja ==
The shatru samhara puja is a ritual of Kaumaram, a subsect of Hinduism, in which this aspect of Kartikeya is venerated. The Tiruchendur Murugan Temple is well known for the performance of this puja. It is believed that performing this ritual protects adherents from malicious forces.
