= Marshall School, Dehradun =

Marshall School

Location
- 40, East Canal Road; Dehradun, Uttarakhand; India; 30°19′07″N 78°02′54″E

Information
- Type: Private Co-Educational
- Established: 1967
- Founder: Francis Russell Marshall
- Status: Open
- School board: ICSE
- Teaching staff: 3
- Grades: K - 12th
- Age: 3.5+
- Classes: English, Hindi, Mathematics, Computers
- Language: English
- Schedule: 10am - 5pm
- Classrooms: 32
- Campus size: 22.03 acres
- Campus type: Suburban
- Houses: Ashoka; Shivaji; Azad; Pratap
- Sports: Basketball, Cricket, Badminton, Hockey, Volleyball, Football, Tennis, Gymnastics
- Alumni: Ali Abbas Zafar - film director and screenwriter. Rishabh Telang - Founder Cult Fitness Lavanya Tripathi- Film Actress

Marshall School, Dehradun is a co-educational school in Dehradun, the capital of the state of Uttarakhand in India. The school has been showing consistent results in both the 10th and 12th examinations CISCE. The school is located on the East Canal road in Dehradun.

== History ==
Marshall School was founded in 1967 by Francis Russell Marshall, a British educator, with only five students.

== Facilities ==
Marshall has a well equipped computer lab with one computer per student.

=== Hostel ===
The school has a hostel facility that is divided up by junior and senior grades, as well as by boys and girls.

=== Athletic courts ===
Marshall School has separate athletic courts for indoor and outdoor sports. Tennis, basketball, and volleyball all have hard outdoor courts while badminton has an indoor court.

== Competition ==
The school organizes many events for integrated development of students, including a debate competition. The events attract students from around the valley and north India to participate every year. The school has four houses:

- Blue (Ashoka)
- Green (Shivaji)
- Yellow (Azad)
- Red (Pratap)

Every year these four houses compete among themselves to win different sport events, competitions and overall academics. The school organizes painting competitions, debates, sports and other activities on campus. A School Headboy and Headgirl are chosen every year.

=== Sports ===
Regular sporting events such as basketball, cricket, badminton, hockey, volleyball, football, tennis, and gymnastics are organised by the school and professional sport coaches help students.

== Affiliation ==
The School is affiliated to Council of Indian School of Central Examination. The school conducts both the standard 10th ICSE and the standard 12th ISC examinations.
