= Shatruvu (2013 film) =

Indian Telugu-language thriller film

- Official poster
- Directed by: N.S.R Prasad
- Produced by: VS Ramireddy
- Starring: Srikanth; Aksha Pardasany
- Cinematography: Rahul
- Music by: Gana
- Release date: 24 January 2013
- Country: India
- Language: Telugu

Shatruvu (transl. Enemy) is a 2013 Indian Telugu-language thriller film directed by N.S.R Prasad and starring Srikanth and Aksha Pardasany.

== Cast ==
- Srikanth as Shankaranna a.k.a. Shankar
- Aksha Pardasany as Anusha a.k.a. Anu
- Rahman as Arvind
- Prabhakar
- Raghu Babu
- Duvvasi Mohan

== Production ==
The film was shot in Hyderabad and Bangkok.

== Soundtrack ==
Music by Gana.

1. Regupallu - Malathi
2. Jabili - Rajesh, Bhargavi Pillai
3. Dhama Dhama - Vijay Prakash
4. Ammevaro - Nitya Santhoshini, Rajesh
5. Shalalalaa - Suchitra, Kenny

== Reception ==
Karthik Pasupulate of The Times of India opined that "It seems like a B-Grade action film from the nineties and everything looks too outdated. There are too many loopholes in the script and the execution so analysis into what all went wrong will be a waste of time". A critic from 123telugu gave the film a rating of 1 out of 5. The critic called the film outdated and said that Srikanth should not do such films.
