= Bhale Bhale Magadivoy =

2015 film directed by Maruthi Dasari

- Theatrical release poster
- Directed by: Maruthi
- Written by: Maruthi
- Produced by: V. Vamsi Krishna Reddy; Pramod Uppalapati; Bunny Vas
- Starring: Nani; Lavanya Tripathi
- Cinematography: Nizar Shafi
- Edited by: S. B. Uddhav
- Music by: Gopi Sunder
- Production companies: UV Creations; GA2 Pictures
- Release date: 4 September 2015
- Running time: 145 minutes
- Country: India
- Language: Telugu
- Budget: ₹7–9 crore (Note: The Hindu estimates the film's budget as ₹7 crore, and Deccan Chronicle estimates the film's budget as ₹9 crore.)
- Box office: ₹50.05 crore

Bhale Bhale Magadivoy (transl. You are an interesting man) is a 2015 Indian Telugu-language romantic comedy film written and directed by Maruthi. Produced by Bunny Vasu under the production companies GA2 Pictures and UV Creations, Bhale Bhale Magadivoy stars Nani and Lavanya Tripathi, with Murali Sharma, Ajay, Naresh, Sithara, and Vennela Kishore in supporting roles. The film revolves around Lucky, an absent-minded plant scientist and his efforts to hide his inherent memory-related flaws from Nandana, a benevolent Kuchipudi dancer with whom he is in a relationship.

The title Bhale Bhale Magadivoy was borrowed from a song of the same name composed by M. S. Viswanathan for K. Balachander's 1978 Telugu film Maro Charitra. Gopi Sunder composed the film's soundtrack and background score. Principal photography began in March 2013, and ended that July. Including post-production tasks, the film was completed in seven months. Though mostly shot in and around Hyderabad, one of the songs was filmed in Goa.

Produced on a budget of around ₹7–9 crore, Bhale Bhale Magadivoy was released on Thursday 4 September 2015 in 700 screens across the globe. It received positive reviews from critics and was a box office Blockbuster, grossing over ₹50.05 crore globally in its full run. At the time of its release, it became the fourth-highest grossing Telugu film of all time at the United States box office, where it was released in 115 screens. The film received three nominations at the 63rd Filmfare Awards South: Best Film (Telugu), Best Actor (Telugu) and the Critics Best Actor – Telugu for Nani, winning the latter most. It was remade in Kannada as Sundaranga Jaana in 2016 and in Tamil as Ghajinikanth in 2018.

== Plot ==
Lucky is an absent-minded junior botanist who is easily distracted by other tasks while working on his current research. His father arranges his marriage with the daughter of Panduranga Rao, a senior botanist. Rao decides to break the alliance after learning about Lucky's mental condition and warns him not to show up again. On his way to donate blood to his boss, Lucky falls in love with Nandana, a kuchipudi dance teacher, and gets diverted. He creates a positive impression by unknowingly donating blood to one of her students.

In their frequent meetings, Lucky often forgets things (such as going out without his shoes or giving away his motorbike keys to a beggar). Still, he manages to hide this shortcoming from Nandana by claiming he is a philanthropist. He is unaware of the fact that Nandana is Rao's daughter, the young woman whom he was supposed to marry before. Rao's friend's son Ajay, a police inspector, also falls in love with Nandana while she is waiting for Lucky's proposal. When he tries to propose on her birthday, Lucky ends up taking Nandana's pregnant sister-in-law, who is experiencing labour pains, to a nearby hospital. After the delivery, Nandana proposes to Lucky, and they become a couple.

Nandana informs Lucky that her father has accepted their proposal and wants to meet him. Lucky and Rao meet as strangers when Rao insults Lucky after an incident with a little girl who was about to fall into a pond. Lucky later realises that Nandana is Rao's daughter and flees. Lucky and Nandana plan to meet later. Lucky makes a friend of his pose as Nandana's lover, and joins Rao as an apprentice.

When Nandana's relatives attend the naming ceremony of the newborn child, Rao's nephew assumes Lucky's friend is her potential lover, and all the others assume Lucky is Nandana's suitor. Rao's nephew becomes further confused when Lucky visits a sick Nandana to spend some quality time with her. Days later, Rao wants Lucky to escort Nandana and her relatives to Srisailam. Lucky, while driving, misses a turn and reaches the outskirts of Bangalore. He takes them to a nearby temple and explains that it is a very special and historically significant temple.

Ajay, who is confused about the identity of Nandana's lover (as Lucky and his friend keep changing places depending on who is around at the moment), manages to get a video of Lucky romancing Nandana. When they all arrive back home, Ajay reveals Lucky's mental condition to Nandana, and they break up. On the day of Nandana's engagement with Ajay, Rao, who has become aware of the sincerity of Lucky's love, advises her to choose Lucky over Ajay. When Ajay makes it clear he intends to marry Nandana by force, Rao challenges Lucky to stop it, this time without forgetting.

Rao meets Lucky and reveals that he has been aware of his love for Nandana since the moment she and Lucky met at the hospital, and that, since then, he has been watching to see how Lucky's amnesia might affect his relationship with Nandana. Lucky visits the temple where the marriage is scheduled to take place, but ends up forgetting, instead buying a lemon soda. However, this turns out to be a trick, as he wants to lure Ajay's henchmen into a false sense of security. He reaches the original marriage venue (actually an aluminium factory) in time with help from Ajay's henchmen and informally weds Nandana there, after a duel with Ajay.

A week later, Rao visits Nandana and Lucky, a married couple, who tell him that Lucky's condition has improved post marriage. During their conversations, Rao says that Ajay has been missing for a week, and his father is concerned. Lucky remembers that he tied Ajay with a rope at the factory. When he reaches the spot, and Ajay asks why he did not release him, Lucky apologizes and says he forgot.

== Cast ==
- Nani as Lakkaraju "Lucky", Nandana’s love interest
- Lavanya Tripathi as Nandana “Nandu”, Lucky’s love interest
- Murali Sharma as Panduranga Rao, Nandana's father
- Naresh as Anjaneyulu, Lucky's father
- Sithara as Lucky's mother
- Ajay as Ajay, Police Inspector
- Madhumitha as Nandana's sister-in-law
- Vennela Kishore as Lucky's friend
- Srinivasa Reddy as Nandana's relative
- Satya Krishnan as Nandana's relative
- Praveen as Praveen, Lucky's friend
- Y. Kasi Viswanath as Praveen's boss
- Vikram Savyasachi as Ajay's subordinate
- Ragini as Nandana's relative

== Production ==
=== Development ===
V. Vamsi Krishna Reddy and Pramod Uppalapati signed Maruthi to direct a film starring Nani and Lavanya Tripathi under their banner UV Creations. The film, as yet untitled, was formally announced in February 2015, before the release of Nani's Yevade Subramanyam. Maruthi wanted to tell the story of a person who has a shortcoming that makes him think he is not worthy of being loved. Bunny Vasu co-produced the film under the banner GA2 Pictures, a sub-division of Geetha Arts, with Allu Aravind as the film's presenter, making it a joint venture with UV Creations. The film was titled Bhale Bhale Magadivoy after a song of the same name composed by M. S. Viswanathan for K. Balachander's Maro Charitra (1978). Gopi Sunder composed the film's music. Nizar Shafi and S. B. Uddhav were the film's cinematographer and editor respectively.

=== Casting ===
Nani played the role of Lakkaraju, called Lucky, an absentminded young man who often forgets the task he is currently performing when he is distracted by something else. He initially wanted to turn down Maruthi's proposal due to the latter's previous risqué films. After listening to the script, he liked the absence of irrelevant comedy tracks. Tripathi plays the role of Nandana, an innocent kuchipudi dancer. Regarding her looks, Tripathi said that the emphasis was on "graceful attires, simple accessories and kohl-rimmed eyes". She was previously trained in kathak, and two teachers assisted her with the dance as a part of her preparation for the character. Murli Sharma plays the role of Tripathi's conservative father; he said he found the role difficult to portray as most of his previous roles were more aggressive in nature. Vennela Kishore was selected to play a supporting role. Naresh and Sithara play Nani's parents, and Ajay, Praveen, and Srinivasa Reddy play supporting roles in the film.

=== Filming ===
The film was officially launched on 2 March 2015 at Hyderabad, with principal photography commenced the following day. Nani joined the set two days later. The song "Endaro" was filmed as a montage number with scenes featuring the humorous consequences of the protagonist's poor memory and his girlfriend's reactions to them. By late May 2015, the filming of talkie portions was almost done and a few song sequences were filmed at Ramoji Film City. For one particular scene, Nani delivered eight pages of dialogue in a single take. The song "Hello Hello" was filmed in Goa during the rains, which was a spontaneous decision by the filmmakers. The principal photography was completed on 28 July 2015 at Saradhi Studios in Ameerpet, Hyderabad. Including post-production tasks, the film was completed in seven months. Singer Chinmayi, who dubbed for Tripathi in her Telugu debut Andala Rakshasi (2012), also dubbed for her character in this film. Tripathi said that she wanted Chinmayi to dub for her lines because she had a good understanding of the character and the situations and had a voice similar to hers.

== Music ==
Gopi Sunder composed the film's soundtrack, which consisted of five songs. The lyrics were written by Ramajogayya Sastry, Sri Mani, and Bhaskarabhatla Ravi Kumar. The first three songs in the album were released on 12 August 2015 at an FM station in Hyderabad. The rest of the songs in the soundtrack album was released on 8 August 2015, three days later at a promotional event held in Hyderabad, with actor Allu Arjun attending as guest of honour. Lahari Music marketed the soundtrack album.

== Release ==
Bhale Bhale Magadivoy was released on 4 September 2015 in 700 screens across the globe, competing with Dynamite and Jayasurya, the Telugu dubbed version of Paayum Puli. CineGalaxy Inc. acquired the film's overseas theatrical distribution rights. The film was released in 115 screens across the United States.

== Reception ==
=== Critical reception ===
Bhale Bhale Magadivoy received positive reviews from critics. Sangeetha Devi Dundoo of The Hindu found the film to be a "laugh riot" and stated that Bhale Bhale Magadivoy "puts logic aside but there's plenty of situational humour where you'll find yourself laughing aloud and having a good time. And these laughs are with [rather] than at the protagonist". N. Sethumadhavan of the Bangalore Mirror called the film a "fresh breeze" and stated that the film "reasserts that Nani is a talent to watch" and that Maruthi "has indeed surprised us with a clean family entertainer". Sify called the film a "cool entertainer" and stated that it is a "neatly packaged romcom about a mini Ghajini's travails".

Pranita Jonnalagedda of The Times of India gave the film 3.5 out of 5 stars and stated that Bhale Bhale Magadivoy comes across as a "breath of fresh air" because it "successfully keeps itself away from the regular formula of romantic comedies [and is] devoid of the oh-so-overused cliches" and is a "delight for anyone looking for wholesome entertainment". Suresh Kavirayani of the Deccan Chronicle also gave the film 3.5 out of 5 stars and stated that the film can be watched for "some hilarious scenes and Nani's brilliance performance [sic]". Behindwoods gave the film 2.75 out of 5 stars and called it a "fun ride that will entertain you throughout" and added, "What amazes the most is the film doesn't resort to a predictable narration. The movie is filled with plenty of twists to keep the audience hooked from the scratch to finish line and it is the primary USP of the film".

=== Box office ===
Bhale Bhale Magadivoy collected US$70,132 from the premier shows at the United States and US$164,459 on the first day, taking its total to US$234,591 (₹1.56 crore), which trade analyst Taran Adarsh called a "smashing start". The first weekend figures at the United States box office stood at US$718,378 (₹4.8 crore). It grossed ₹14 crore and collected a distributor share of ₹9 crore in its first weekend at the global box office. The film grossed ₹23.95 crore and collected a distributor share of ₹14.2 crore in its first week at the global box office, recovering production costs. It collected US$1,034,228 at the United States box office in eight days and became the 15th Telugu film to cross the US$1 million mark there. It also became the fifth-highest grossing Telugu film of 2015 at the United States box office.

The film collected US$265,376 from 84 screens at the United States box office in its second weekend, taking its ten-day total to $1.2 million (₹8.71 crore). It collected US$1,356,673 (₹8.91 crore) in 17 days, and US$1,426,527 (₹9.24 crore) in 38 days at the United States box office, thus becoming the fourth-highest grossing Telugu film of all time after Baahubali: The Beginning, Srimanthudu, and Attarintiki Daredi (2013). The film grossed more than ₹50.05 crore globally in its lifetime, and the United States box office figures stood at approximately ₹9.40 crore. It was one of the few small-budget Telugu films to cross the US$1 million mark and also the first blockbuster in Nani's career earning him the nick name NATURAL STAR.

== Accolades ==
Ceremony	Category	Nominee	Result	Ref.
IIFA Utsavam 2015	Best Picture	Bunny Vasu	Nominated	
IIFA Utsavam 2015	Best Performance In A Leading Role – Male	Nani	Nominated	
IIFA Utsavam 2015	Best Performance In A Leading Role – Female	Lavanya Tripathi	Nominated	
IIFA Utsavam 2015	Best Performance In A Comic Role	Vennela Kishore	Won	
63rd Filmfare Awards South	Best Film – Telugu	Bhale Bhale Magadivoy	Nominated	
63rd Filmfare Awards South	Best Actor – Telugu	Nani	Nominated	
63rd Filmfare Awards South	Critics Best Actor – Telugu	Nani	Won	
5th South Indian International Movie Awards	SIIMA Award for Best Comedian (Telugu)	Vennela Kishore	Won	
5th South Indian International Movie Awards	SIIMA Award for Best Director (Telugu)	Maruthi	Nominated	
5th South Indian International Movie Awards	SIIMA Award for Best Music Director (Telugu)	Gopi Sundar	Nominated	
5th South Indian International Movie Awards	SIIMA Award for Best Actor (Telugu)	Nani	Nominated	
Zee Telugu Apsara Awards	Rising Star of the Year	Lavanya Tripathi	Won	
Nandi Awards	Nandi Award for Best Male Comedian	Vennela Kishore	Won	

== Remakes ==
Bhale Bhale Magadivoy was remade into Kannada as Sundaranga Jaana (2016), and in Tamil as Ghajinikanth (2018).
