= Thaman S discography =

Thaman S is an Indian composer and playback singer known for his works majorly in Telugu and Tamil cinema. He made his music debut in 2009, with the Telugu film Malli Malli. During the course of his decade long career, he has composed and produced original scores and songs for more than 100 films in various languages, predominantly in Telugu and Tamil cinema in addition to Kannada. He has composed songs for two Hindi films. He worked under Mani Sharma for years before becoming an independent composer. He is the recipient of the National Film Award for Best Music Direction for the soundtrack of Ala Vaikuntapuramulo (2020).

== As composer ==
Key
†	Denotes films that have not yet been released

Year	Title	Language	Notes	Ref.
2009	Malli Malli	Telugu		
2009	Kick	Telugu	1 song reused from the delayed Moscowin Kavery	
2009	Sindhanai Sei	Tamil		
2009	Anjaneyulu	Telugu		
2009	Sankham	Telugu		
2009	Eeram	Tamil		
2009	Jayeebhava	Telugu		
2010	Mundhinam Paartheney	Tamil		
2010	Thillalangadi	Tamil	2 songs reused from Kick	
2010	Moscowin Kavery	Tamil		
2010	Brindavanam	Telugu		
2010	Nagaram Marupakkam	Tamil	1 song reused from the delayed Veera	
2010	Ayyanar	Tamil		
2010	Aridhu Aridhu	Tamil		
2010	Ragada	Telugu		
2011	Mirapakay	Telugu		
2011	Mambattiyan	Tamil		
2011	Sabash Sariyana Potti	Tamil		
2011	Veera	Telugu		
2011	Kanchana	Tamil		
2011	Vandhaan Vendraan	Tamil		
2011	Kandireega	Telugu		
2011	Dookudu	Telugu		
2011	Osthe	Tamil		
2011	Mouna Guru	Tamil		
2012	Businessman	Telugu		
2012	Bodyguard	Telugu		
2012	Nippu	Telugu		
2012	Kadhalil Sodhappuvadhu Yeppadi	Tamil		
2012	Ishtam	Tamil	Reused 1 song from Kick and Mirapaakay	
2012	Thadaiyara Thaakka	Tamil		
2012	Kanna Laddu Thinna Aasaiya	Tamil		
2013	Naayak	Telugu		
2013	Settai	Tamil		
2013	Jabardasth	Telugu		
2013	Shadow	Telugu		
2013	Baadshah	Telugu		
2013	Greeku Veerudu	Telugu		
2013	Gouravam	Telugu	Simultaneously shot in Tamil	
2013	Tadakha	Telugu		
2013	Balupu	Telugu		
2013	Pattathu Yaanai	Tamil		
2013	Ramayya Vasthavayya	Telugu		
2013	Masala	Telugu		
2013	All in All Azhagu Raja	Tamil		
2014	Vallinam	Tamil		
2014	Race Gurram	Telugu		
2014	Damaal Dumeel	Tamil		
2014	Athiyayam	Tamil		
2014	Rabhasa	Telugu		
2014	Power	Telugu		
2014	Power	Kannada		
2014	Meaghamann	Tamil		
2014	Aagadu	Telugu		
2014	Vanmam	Tamil		
2014	Tamizhuku En Ondrai Azhuthavum	Tamil		
2015	Beeruva	Telugu		
2015	Tiger	Telugu		
2015	Savaale Samaali	Tamil		
2015	Vaalu	Tamil	Reused 2 songs from Mirapakay	
2015	Kanchana 2	Tamil	1 song and background score	
2015	Vaa Deal	Tamil	Unreleased	
2015	Pandaga Chesko	Telugu	Reused 1 song from the delayed Vaalu	
2015	Kick 2	Telugu		
2015	Sakalakala Vallavan Appatakkar	Tamil	1 song reused from Dookudu, 1 song reused from Baadshah, 1 song reused from Race Gurram	
2015	Saagasam	Tamil		
2015	Bruce Lee: The Fighter	Telugu		
2015	Sher	Telugu		
2016	Dictator	Telugu		
2016	Chakravyuha	Kannada		
2016	Aarathu Sinam	Tamil		
2016	Zoom	Kannada		
2016	Sarrainodu	Telugu		
2016	Dhilluku Dhuddu	Tamil		
2016	Chuttalabbai	Telugu		
2016	Srirastu Subhamastu	Telugu	1 song reused from Saagasam	
2016	Thikka	Telugu		
2016	Jaguar	Kannada; Telugu		
2017	Shivalinga	Tamil		
2017	Winner	Telugu		
2017	Vaigai Express	Tamil		
2017	Ivan Thanthiran	Tamil		
2017	Yaar Ivan	Tamil		
2017	Veedevadu	Telugu		
2017	Goutham Nanda	Telugu		
2017	Mahanubhavudu	Telugu		
2017	Raju Gari Gadhi 2	Telugu		
2017	Jawaan	Telugu		
2018	Sketch	Tamil		
2018	Gayatri	Telugu		
2018	Achari America Yatra	Telugu		
2018	Bhaagamathie	Telugu		
2018	Bhaagamathie	Tamil		
2018	Tholi Prema	Telugu		
2018	Inttelligent	Telugu		
2018	Chal Mohan Ranga	Telugu		
2018	Aravinda Sametha Veera Raghava	Telugu		
2018	Amar Akbar Anthony	Telugu		
2018	Happy Wedding	Telugu	Background score only	
2018	Kavacham	Telugu		
2018	Orange	Kannada		
2019	Mr. Majnu	Telugu		
2019	Ninu Veedani Needanu Nene	Telugu		
2019	Ayogya	Tamil	1 song reused from Sarrainodu	
2019	Aruvam	Tamil		
2019	Voter	Telugu		
2019	Magamuni	Tamil		
2019	Prati Roju Pandage	Telugu		
2019	Venky Mama	Telugu		
2020	Ala Vaikunthapurramuloo	Telugu		
2020	Disco Raja	Telugu		
2020	Miss India	Telugu		
2020	Solo Brathuke So Better	Telugu		
2021	Krack	Telugu		
2021	Eeswaran	Tamil		
2021	Wild Dog	Telugu		
2021	Yuvarathnaa	Kannada		
2021	Vakeel Saab	Telugu		
2021	Tuck Jagadish	Telugu		
2021	Varudu Kaavalenu	Telugu	2 songs only	
2021	Akhanda	Telugu		
2022	Super Machi	Telugu		
2022	DJ Tillu	Telugu	Background score only	
2022	Bheemla Nayak	Telugu		
2022	Radhe Shyam	Telugu; Hindi	Background score only	
2022	Ghani	Telugu		
2022	Sarkaru Vaari Paata	Telugu		
2022	Thank You	Telugu		
2022	Godfather	Telugu		
2022	Prince	Tamil		
2023	Varisu	Tamil		
2023	Veera Simha Reddy	Telugu		
2023	Bro	Telugu		
2023	Skanda	Telugu		
2023	Bhagavanth Kesari	Telugu		
2023	Annapoorani: The Goddess of Food	Tamil		
2024	Guntur Kaaram	Telugu		
2024	Rasavathi	Tamil		
2024	Baby John	Hindi		
2025	Game Changer	Telugu		
2025	Daaku Maharaaj	Telugu		
2025	Sabdham	Tamil		
2025	Mad Square	Telugu	Background score only	
2025	Jaat	Hindi		
2025	They Call Him OG	Telugu	Also arranger, producer and programmer	
2025	Telusu Kada	Telugu		
2025	Akhanda 2: Thaandavam	Telugu		
2026	The RajaSaab	Telugu		
2026	S Saraswathi	Telugu		
2026	Ustaad Bhagat Singh	Telugu	Background score only	
2026	Lenin	Telugu		
2026	Idhayam Murali	Tamil	Also acted in the film	
2026	Korean Kanakaraju	Telugu		
2026	Sigma	Tamil		
2026	Aadarsha Kutumbam House No: 47 - AK47	Telugu		
2026	Itllu Arjuna	Telugu		
2026	Dada †	Telugu		
2027	Kaaka †	Telugu		
2027	Ottakomban †	Malayalam	Debut in Malayalam cinema	

== As playback singer ==
Year	Song	Film	Language
2009	"Tharai Irangiya"	Eeram	Tamil
2009	"O Meri Bhavri"	Veera	Telugu
2011	"Vaishali Vaishali"	Mirapakay	Telugu
2011	"Malayoor Nattamai"	Mambattiyan	Tamil
2011	"Nagarudhe"	Vandhaan Vendraan	Tamil
2011	"Unnale Unnale"	Osthe	Tamil
2012	"Endhukoo"	Bodyguard	Telugu
2012	"Duba Duba"	Nippu	Telugu
2012	"Sir Osthara"	Businessman	Telugu
2012	"Melukora Melukora"	Love Failure	Telugu
2013	"Edhirthu Nil"	Biriyani	Telugu
2013	"En Aalu"	Summa Nachunu Irukku	Tamil
2013	"Kajalu Chellivaa"	Balupu	Telugu
2013	"Kathi Lanti Pilla"	Naayak	Telugu
2014	"Naari Naari"	Aagadu	Telugu
2014	"Uyiril Uyiril"	Vallinam	
2014	"Led Kallatho"	Pencil	Telugu
2014	"Down Down Down Dappa"	Race Gurram	Telugu
2015	"Nuvve Nuvve"	Kick 2	Telugu
2015	"Ye Pilla Pilla"	Pandaga Chesko	Telugu
2015	"Chuda Sakagunnave"	Pandaga Chesko	Telugu
2015	"Le Chalo"	Bruce Lee: The Fighter	Telugu
2015	"Rock Your Body"	Sankarabharanam	Telugu
2016	"Anu Anu"	Srirastu Subhamastu	Telugu
2016	"Neekosam"	Thikka	Telugu
2016	"Vellipoke"	Thikka	Telugu
2016	"Aunanaa Kaadanaa"	Jawaan	Telugu
2017	"Kiss Me Baby"	Mahanubhavudu	Telugu
2017	"Zindagi Na Milegi Dobara"	Goutham Nanda	Telugu
2018	"Dhaadikaara"	Sketch	Tamil
2018	"Ninnila"	Tholi Prema	Telugu
2019	"Yennellako"	Venky Mama	Telugu
2020	"Kotthaga Kotthaga"	Miss India	Telugu
2022	"Jessica"	Prince	Tamil
2022	"Jessica"	Prince	Telugu
2023	"Vaa Thalaivaa"	Varisu	Tamil
2023	"Chemiki Kannu"	Vaarasudu	Telugu
2023	"Jaanavule"	Bro	Telugu
2024	"Thai Thai"	Rasavathi	Tamil
2024	"Saaral Saaral"	Rasavathi	Tamil
2024	"Bandobast"	Baby John	Hindi
2025	"Dabidi Dibidi"	Daaku Maharaaj	Telugu
2025	"Sukka Neere"	Daaku Maharaaj	Telugu
2025	"Firestorm"	They Call Him OG	Telugu
2025	"Firestorm"	They Call Him OG - (D)	Hindi

=== Music video ===
Year	Track	Artist(s)	Lyricist(s)	Language	Ref.
2021	"Allu Arjun Rap Song"	Roll Rida, Harika Narayan	The Hyderabad Nawabs, Roll Rida	Telugu	
2024	Flag Anthem	Arivu	Vivek	Tamil	
2025	"Unga Vijay Na Varen"	Vijay	Vivek	Tamil	
2026	TVK Election Campaign	Thalapathy Viay, VM Mahalingam	Vivek	Tamil	
