= Ra Ra... Krishnayya =

- Movie Poster
- Directed by: Mahesh Babu Pachigolla
- Written by: Mahesh Babu Pachigolla
- Based on: A Life Less Ordinary by John Hodge
- Produced by: Vamsi Krishna Srinivas
- Starring: Sundeep Kishan; Regina Cassandra; Jagapathi Babu; Kalyani; Tanikella Bharani
- Cinematography: Sai Sriram; Dasaradhi Sivendra
- Edited by: Marthand K. Venkatesh
- Music by: Achu Rajamani
- Production company: SVK Cinemas
- Release date: 4 July 2014
- Running time: 139 Minutes
- Country: India
- Language: Telugu

Ra Ra... Krishnayya (transl. Come Here Krishnayya) is a 2014 Indian Telugu-language romantic comedy film written and directed by Mahesh Babu Pachigolla and produced by Vamsi Krishna Srinivas on the SVK Cinemas banner. It stars Sundeep Kishan and Regina Cassandra, while Jagapathi Babu, Kalyani, Tanikella Bharani, and Brahmaji play supporting roles. Achu Rajamani composed the music. Sai Sriram and Marthand K. Venkatesh handled the cinematography and editing of the film respectively. It is a remake of the 2012 Hindi romantic comedy, Tere Naal Love Ho Gaya, which itself was based on the 1997 English film, A Life Less Ordinary, directed by Danny Boyle.

The film was officially launched on 11 August 2013 in Hyderabad, and shooting started there on 12 August 2013. Majority of the film was shot in Hyderabad and locales of Kerala. The film's shooting finished in May 2014. The film was released in theaters on 4 July 2014.

== Plot ==
Krishna alias Kittu (Sundeep Kishan) is a cab driver who saves his money with the cab owner Manikyam Mogiliyar (Tanikella Bharani). When Manikyam refuses to return his money, Kittu kidnaps Manikyam's daughter Nandeshwari, alias Nandu (Regina Cassandra). As a consequence of Nandu's displeasure with her father's plans for her arranged marriage, she voluntarily cooperates as Kittu's hostage. While on the run, Kittu and his "hostage" unknowingly reach Kerala. They fall in love with each other in the process. On the day of the scheduled hostage exchange, Nandu is tied up with her hands behind her back while Kittu proceeds to collect the ransom money from her father. But when he is about to do so, Nandu gets kidnapped by another kidnapper Babji (Brahmaji), who takes her to Jaggu Bhai's (Jagapathi Babu) house. It is revealed that Kittu is Jaggu Bhai's brother, and he did not want to take up the family business of kidnapping. The rest of the story is all about various twists and turns.

== Cast ==
- Sundeep Kishan as Krishna / Kittu
- Regina Cassandra as Nandeshwari / Nandu
- Jagapathi Babu as Jaggu Bhai, Kittu's brother
- Kalyani as Jaggu Bhai's wife
- Tanikella Bharani as Manikyam Mogiliyar, Nandu's father
- Brahmaji as Babji
- Ravi Babu as Pothuraju
- Satyam Rajesh as Swamy
- Chalapathi Rao
- Thagubothu Ramesh
- Duvvasi Mohan
- Y. Kasi Viswanath
- Lahari as Navya
- Vishnu Priya as Swathi
- Prasad Babu
- Venu Yeldandi
- Vasu Inturi
- Junior Relangi
- Anitha Chowdary

== Soundtrack ==
Ra Ra... Krishnayya

Soundtrack album by Achu Rajamani
- Released: 30 May 2014
- Recorded: 2013
- Genre: Feature film soundtrack
- Length: 21:53
- Language: Telugu
- Label: Aditya Music
- Producer: Achu Rajamani

Achu Rajamani chronology
Pandavulu Pandavulu Tummeda (2014)	Ra Ra... Krishnayya (2014)	Current Teega (2014)

Achu Rajamani composed the music for the film, marking his second collaboration with Sundeep Kishan after DK Bose. The soundtrack was released on Aditya Music label on 30 May 2014, for which a promotional event was held at a hotel in Hyderabad on the same day.

The soundtrack received positive response from critics. The Times of India wrote: "Music director Achu has dished out a peppy album for this romantic entertainer borrowing varied music elements like classic rock, blues, electronic dance music and desi beats." IndiaGlitz stated, "Ra Ra Krishnayya by a less known music director like Achu does deliver goods. Although the tunes are not imaginative, the musician makes the package attractive with his creative inputs. The selection of the singers is good, especially Shreya Ghoshal and Achu himself. The lyricists are there to give the songs the much needed icing on the cake." Milliblog wrote: "Mixed bag, but the good ones showcase immense promise for this composer!".

Track list
No.	Title	Lyrics	Artist(s)	Length
1.	"Hero Hero"	Ramajogayya Sastry	Karthik, Achu Rajamani	03:56
2.	"Ra Ra Krishnayya"	Ramajogayya Sastry	Achu Rajamani, Shreya Ghoshal, Yazin Nizar	03:29
3.	"Onam Onam"	Sri Mani	Achu Rajamani, Chinmayi	03:42
4.	"Vadarey Machan"	Sri Mani	Suchitra, Achu Rajamani	03:47
5.	"Come on Baby"	Bhaskarabhatla	Soumya, Sree Chitra, Sooraj Santhosh	03:28
6.	"Seetha Kalyanam"		Mahathi	03:28
Total length:				21:53

== Production ==
=== Development ===
Krishna Vamsi's protégé Mahesh, who was a friend to Sundeep Kishan, narrated the film's story even before the actor's moderately successful film Routine Love Story. But the project's confirmation happened after his 2013 release Venkatadri Express. The project was titled as Ra Ra Krishnayya and said to be produced by Vamsi Krishna Srinivas on the SVK Cinema banner, known for his previous film Solo directed by Parasuram and was launched at Film Nagar in Hyderabad on 11 August 2013. While the story, screenplay and direction were handled by Mahesh, Arjun Chelluri was recruited as the executive producer. It was later reported that Achu Rajamani would compose the music, Sriram would handle the cinematography, Marthand K Venkatesh would be the editor of the film, while Ramanjaneyulu would be the art director of the film.

=== Casting ===
Sundeep Kishan and Regina Cassandra were a part of the principal cast even before the commencement of the project in its development stages marking the couple's second film after Routine Love Story, which was released in 2011. The film was supposed to be Sundeep Kishan's first attempt at a pure love story, though he had done a few romantic comedies in the past. On 12 February 2014 it was confirmed that Jagapathi Babu would play the role of Sundeep's elder brother in the film while Kalyani, Tanikella Bharani, Chalapathi Rao, and Kasi Viswanath would play other crucial roles. In the end of May 2014, it was reported that Sundeep and Regina would share a sensuous kiss in the film. The reports were confirmed when the film's trailer featured a glimpse of a deep kiss between the leads.

=== Filming ===
During the launch of the movie on 11 August 2013, it was reported that the first shooting schedule would begin on 12 August and would continue till 26 August in Hyderabad, followed by the second schedule from 10 to 25 September in Kerala where some talkie part and two songs with the hero and heroine would be shot. It was then estimated that the entire shooting would be wrapped up with the third and final schedule in October 2013.

However, in mid-October 2013, during the shoot at a temple in Alapuzha at Kerala, the cast and crew of the film, including the director and Sundeep's manager, were attacked by Kerala RSS workers. The unit was attacked as they hired local people to act in a Telugu film and Sundeep's 57-year-old manager who attained permission was a Muslim. The shooting then continued at a rapid pace and at the end of February 2014, it was reported that the film's shoot was complete except for two songs and the climax scenes, which would be shot in the schedule commencing in March 2014. The Kerala schedule was handled by known line producer Appu Ajmal. Then, a song on the lead pair was shot at Hyderabad. After much silent shooting, at the end of April 2014 a song was shot on Sundeep and Regina near the beach road in Vishakhapatnam, and Regina wrapped up her part in the film on 29 April 2014. In the May, it was confirmed that the film's shooting and post-production activities were completed, aiming for a June 2014 release.

== Release ==
After the end of the shoot in May 2014, the filmmakers declared that the film would be released in June 2014. On 4 June 2014, CineGalaxy issued a press release stating that they had acquired the overseas theatrical screening and distribution rights for the film, and that the film was tentatively scheduled for release on 20 June 2014. However, by the end of June, it was confirmed that the film had been scheduled for worldwide theatrical release on 4 July 2014. The film was also later dubbed into Hindi as Kasam Khayi Hai for television release on Zee Cinema on 8 June 2018.
