= Regena Cassandrra =

Indian actress (born 1990)

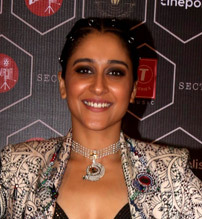
- Regina in 2023
- Born: Regina Cassandra; 13 December 1990 (age 35); Madras, Tamil Nadu, India
- Education: Women's Christian College, Chennai (B.Sc.); Madras University (M.S.)
- Occupation: Actress
- Years active: 2005–present

Regena Cassandrra (born 13 December 1990) is an Indian actress who primarily works in Telugu, Tamil and Hindi films. She is a recipient of several accolades including a SIIMA Award and a CineMAA Award, along with a Filmfare OTT Award nomination.

Cassandrra made her acting debut in a supporting role with the Tamil film Kanda Naal Mudhal (2005) and had her breakthrough with her Telugu debut Siva Manasulo Sruthi (2012), which earned her the SIIMA Award for Best Female Debut – Telugu. She then received commercial success with Routine Love Story (2012), Kedi Billa Killadi Ranga (2013), Power (2014) and Pilla Nuvvu Leni Jeevitham (2014).

Cassandrra received praise for portraying a traditional girl in Subramanyam for Sale (2015), a dental student in Jyo Achyutananda (2016), a youngster in Maanagaram (2017), a drug addict in Awe (2018) and a businesswoman in Evaru (2019). She received the SIIMA Award for Best Actress – Telugu nomination for Jyo Achyutananda. Following her expansion to Hindi films with Ek Ladki Ko Dekha Toh Aisa Laga (2019), she starred in streaming series Rocket Boys (2022) and Jaanbaaz Hindustan Ke (2023).

In addition to her acting career, she is a celebrity endorser for brands and products.

== Early life and education ==
Cassandrra was born on 13 December 1990 in Madras (now Chennai). Her father has Anglo-Indian roots from Goa and her mother is Tamil. She was nine years old when she started anchoring for Splash, a kids' channel. She completed her BSc in psychology from the Women's Christian College, Chennai, and did masters of Science in Counseling Psychology from University of Madras. In 2025, she changed changed the spelling of her full name from Regina Cassandra to "Regena Cassandrra" in accordance with numerology.

== Career ==
=== Debut and early struggle (2005–2014) ===
Cassandrra made her film debut with the Tamil film Kanda Naal Mudhal in 2005 with Karthik Kumar. She next appeared in the 2006 film Azhagiya Asura with Yogi. In 2010, Cassandrra played the lead in the Kannada film Suryakaanti alongside Chetan Kumar, and as she could not speak Kannada, she was told to act out scenes in English and add Kannada to it. Rediff.com wrote, "Regina is more impressive than Chetan. She is really cute and her bubbly expressions suit the role." After this film, she took time out and went on to graduate in psychology and took another year off before taking a final call on joining movies.

Cassandrra made her Telugu debut with Shiva Manasulo Shruti opposite Sudheer Babu. Hindustan Times noted, "Regina charms the viewers with her looks and her performance." She won the SIIMA Award for Best Female Debut - Telugu for the film. Before that, she was shortlisted in the film Life is Beautiful but the production team went on for long time in audition in decided to choose this project and opted out from that film. The same year she appeared opposite Sundeep Kishan in Routine Love Story. which she signed even before her first release in Telugu. In 2013 she had two releases. She first appeared in Kedi Billa Killadi Ranga opposite Sivakarthikeyan. She next played the lead opposite Vikram Anand in Nirnayam. The former proved successful at the box office.

Cassandrra had four releases in 2014. She first appeared opposite Allu Sirish in Kotha Janta. Deccan Chronicle wrote, "The star of the film is undoubtedly Regina. She looks cute and bubbly and delivers a delightful performance." Her next releases was Ra Ra... Krishnayya, opposite Sundeep Kishan. She then played a Bengali girl opposite Ravi Teja, in the commercial success Power. Bangalore Mirror wrote, "Regina looks rather cute in her limited screen presence." Her final film of the year was Pilla Nuvvu Leni Jeevitam opposite Sai Dharam Tej, a box office success.

=== Breakthrough and success in South Indian films (2016–2021) ===
Cassandrra's first release of 2015 was Rajathandhiram alongside Veera(2015). Her next film was the commercially successful Subramanyam for Sale opposite Sai Dharam Tej. Pranita Jonnalagedda of Times of India noted, "Regina brings freshness to the film with her clean act and is brilliant except when she cries." Her last film of the year was Soukhyam opposite Gopichand. Cassandrra appeared in three films in 2016. She appeared in Shourya alongside Manchu Manoj and in Shankara alongside Nara Rohit. The commercially successful film Jyo Achyutananda, became a breakthrough for her. She played a dental student opposite Naga Shaurya and Nara Rohit. Deccan Chronicle wrote, "Regina looks beautiful and her performance is impressive."

In 2017, Cassandrra's first film was the successful Maanagaram opposite Sundeep Kishan. Malini Mannath of The New Indian Express wrote, "Regina's matter-of-fact portrayal is perfect." She subsequently appeared in Saravanan Irukka Bayamaen opposite Udhayanidhi Stalin, Gemini Ganeshanum Suruli Raajanum opposite Atharvaa, Nakshatram opposite Sundeep Kishan and Balakrishnudu opposite Nara Rohit. In 2018, Cassandrra first played a waitress and drug addict in the critical acclaimed Awe. Firstpost noted, "Regina Cassandra has an interesting role, and delivers noteworthy performance." She then appeared in Mr. Chandramouli alongside Gautham Karthik and Silukkuvarupatti Singam opposite Vishnu Vishal. The latter was a critical and commercial success.

Cassandrra's career marked a successful phase in 2019. She first made her Hindi film debut with Ek Ladki Ko Dekha Toh Aisa Laga opposite Sonam Kapoor. She played an unconventional role of a lesbian. Bollywood Hungama noted, "Regina Cassandra is quite an important part of the film and impresses with her confident act." She played a negative character for the first time in 7. Her final film of the year, Evaru earned her critical acclaim. She played a rising businesswoman alongside Adivi Sesh. India Today noted, "Regina Cassandra performs extremely well and for a large part of the film, you cannot fathom whether she's guilty or not." While 123telugu stated, "Regina makes a solid comeback with Evaru. She is amazing in her double-edged role and gives her career best performance."

Cassandrra had five releases in 2021. She first appeared in Mughizh opposite Vijay Sethupathi. She then played a chess coach and computer hacker in Chakra. She then played an orphan in Nenjam Marappathillai. Hindustan Times noted, "Cassandra is incredibly good as Mariam, a role that fits her like a glove." She then appeared in the anthology film Kasada Tabara alongside Premgi Amaren. Cassandrra did a cameo in the bilingual Thalaivii as B. Saroja Devi.

=== Critical acclaim and progression (2022–present) ===
Cassandrra's first release in 2022 was 1945 alongside Rana Daggubati. Cassandrra made her web debut with the series Rocket Boys, where she portrayed Mrinalini Sarabhai opposite Ishwak Singh, and reprised her role in the second season. Saibal Chatterjee of NDTV termed her "terrific", while Roktim Rajpal of India Today noted, "Regina shines despite having limited scope. She channels her character's griefs and insecurities with a fair degree of competence." She then had a special number in Chiranjeevi's Acharya. She then appeared in three more web series, Fingertip, Anya's Tutorial and Shoorveer. Her final release of the year was the bilingual Saakini Daakini. The News Minute stated, "Regina particularly looks perfect as a young police trainee. She performs her stunts well and gives a brilliant performance."

In 2023, Cassandrra first appeared in the web series Jaanbaaz Hindustan Ke, as a NIA officer. Deepa Gehlot of Rediff.com wrote, "Regina Cassandra has an attractive screen presence, but her Kavya is mostly one-dimensional." She next appeared in Farzi as Vijay Sethupathi's wife. Her first film of the year was Karungaapiyam. She next played dual roles in Nene Naa, one of which was an archaeologist. She later played a paranormal investigator in Conjuring Kannappan opposite Sathish. Janani K found her portrayal to be "decent". In her only film of 2024, Cassandrra played a lively girl opposite Dilip Prakash in Utsavam. Nelki Naresh Kumar found her to be "convincing" in Rama's role.

In her first release of 2025, Cassandrra appeared in Vidaamuyarchi, where she played a psychotic gangster opposite Arjun Sarja. Sajin Shrijith of The Week noted, "Regina gets to have fun with a complex character without overdoing it." Avinash Ramachandran opined, "Regena bring in a rather zany vibe to the proceedings and sell her roles with a conviction that is consistent through the film." It underperformed at the box office In her next film Jaat, Cassandrra played a ruthless criminal's wife opposite Randeep Hooda. Rishabh Suri of Hindustan Times stated, "Regina’s Bharathi is a meaty role, and she’s effective from the get-go." Following this, she played C. Sankaran Nair's wife in Kesari Chapter 2 opposite Akshay Kumar. Shubhra Gupta opined that she leave a mark in a small role. Both the films emerged as moderate commercial successes.

== Other work and media image ==
Cassandra has emerged as one of the most dependable and versatile actresses of South Indian cinema." Ram Venkat Srikar of The New Indian Express termed her filmography a mix of "conventional and unconventional", and wrote, "Regina exudes much self-awareness" while describing her acting choices. Zinia Bandyopadhyay of News18 said that the actress is someone who has always "chosen characters that are poles apart from one another". Mayur Sanap of Rediff.com termed her Hindi debut "unconventional", and said, "Cassandra has successfully carved a niche for herself with her choices of films." Sushmita Dey of Times Now noted her for her "versatile roles" and said, "Regina has a unique approach towards every character."

Cassandrra ranked 4th in Rediff.com's "Top Telugu Actresses" list of 2012. In February 2023, she ranked 4th in IMDb's "Popular Indian Celebrities" list. In Hyderabad Times' Most Desirable Woman list, she was placed 14th in 2015, 20th in 2016 and 28th in 2019. In the Chennai Times' Most Desirable Woman list, she was placed 22nd in 2016. Cassandrra is a celebrity endorser for several brands and products such as Kalyan Jewellers, Trends, Biba and Meesho. Cassandrra has also worked for a number of causes. In 2014, she walked the ramp for "Teach for Change" charity show. She has participated in People for Cattle in India's "Water Bowl Challenge", as its campaign ambassador in 2021. She also supports organic farming. In 2023, Cassandrra became the co-founder of Democratic Sangha, participating in the rural women's leadership program. She left the organisation in 2026.

== Filmography ==
Key
†	Denotes films that have not yet been released

=== Films ===
Year	Title	Role	Language	Notes	Ref.
2005	Kanda Naal Mudhal	Latha	Tamil		
2006	Azhagiya Asura	Mahalakshmi	Tamil		
2008	Panchamirtham	Seetha	Tamil	credited as Regina	
2010	Suryakaanti	Kanthi	Kannada		
2012	Siva Manasulo Sruthi	Sruti	Telugu		
2012	Routine Love Story	Tanvi	Telugu		
2013	Kedi Billa Killadi Ranga	Parvathy (Paapaa)	Tamil		
2013	Nirnayam	Jeni	Tamil		
2014	Kotha Janta	Suvarna	Telugu		
2014	Ra Ra... Krishnayya	Nandeshwari "Nandu"	Telugu		
2014	Power	Vaishnavi	Telugu		
2014	Pilla Nuvvu Leni Jeevitham	Sailaja "Sailu" / Sirisha "Siri" (Note: Cassandrra played a single character with two or more names.)	Telugu		
2015	Rajathandhiram	Michelle D'Mello	Tamil		
2015	Subramanyam for Sale	Seetha	Telugu		
2015	Soukhyam	Sailaja "Sailu"	Telugu		
2016	Shourya	Netra	Telugu		
2016	Jyo Achyutananda	Dr. Jyothsna Kumari "Jyo"	Telugu		
2016	Shankara	Ananya "Pappu"	Telugu		
2017	Maanagaram	Aarthy	Tamil		
2017	Saravanan Irukka Bayamaen	Thenmozhi Selvam	Tamil		
2017	Gemini Ganeshanum Suruli Raajanum	Lavanya	Tamil		
2017	Nakshatram	Jamuna	Telugu		
2017	Balakrishnudu	Aadhya	Telugu		
2018	Awe	Mira	Telugu		
2018	Mr. Chandramouli	Madhu	Tamil		
2018	Silukkuvarupatti Singam	Rajeshwari Ramalingam "Raji"	Tamil		
2019	Ek Ladki Ko Dekha Toh Aisa Laga	Kuhu	Hindi	Extended cameo	
2019	7	Saraswathi	Telugu / Tamil	Bilingual film	
2019	Evaru	Sameera Maha	Telugu		
2021	Mughizh	Radhika	Tamil		
2021	Chakra	Leela	Tamil		
2021	Nenjam Marappathillai	Mariam	Tamil		
2021	Kasada Thapara	Tripura Sundari "Trisha"	Tamil	Streaming release	
2021	Thalaivii	B. Saroja Devi	Hindi / Tamil	Bilingual film; cameo	
2022	1945	Anandhi	Tamil / Telugu	Bilingual film	
2022	Acharya	Mandakini	Telugu	Special appearance in a song "Saana Kastham"	
2022	Saakini Daakini	Damini	Telugu		
2023	Karungaapiyam	Umayal Karthika	Tamil		
2023	Nene Naa	Divya / Damayanti (Note: Cassandrra played dual roles.)	Telugu	Dual role	
2023	Conjuring Kannappan	Dark Deves	Tamil		
2024	Utsavam	Rama	Telugu		
2025	Vidaamuyarchi	Deepika Rakshith	Tamil		
2025	Jaat	Bharathi Ranatunga	Hindi		
2025	Kesari Chapter 2	Parvathy Nair	Hindi		
2026	Mareechika	Mareechika	Telugu		
2026	Ananthan Kaadu	Priyamvada	Malayalam / Tamil	Bilingual film	
2026	Mookuthi Amman 2	Bhairavi	Tamil		
TBA	Flashback †	TBA	Tamil	Post-production	
TBA	The Wives †	TBA	Hindi	Filming	
TBA	Section 108 †	Shikha Saxena	Hindi	Post-production	

=== Television ===
Year	Title	Role	Language	Network	Notes	Ref.
2022–2023	Rocket Boys	Mrinalini Sarabhai	Hindi	SonyLIV	2 seasons	
2022	Fingertip	Priya	Tamil	ZEE5	Season 2	
2022	Anya's Tutorial	Madhumitha	Telugu / Tamil	Aha	Bilingual series	
2022	Shoorveer	Flt Lt. Avantika Rao	Hindi	Disney+ Hotstar		
2023	Farzi	Rekha Rao	Hindi	Amazon Prime Video		
2023	Jaanbaaz Hindustan Ke	NIA SP Kavya Iyer	Hindi	ZEE5		
2025	Nadu Center	Herself / Fara	Tamil	JioHotstar	Special appearance	

== Accolades ==
Year	Award	Category	Work	Result	Ref.
2013	South Indian International Movie Awards	Best Female Debut – Telugu	Siva Manasulo Sruthi	Won	
2013	CineMAA Awards	Best Female Debut	Siva Manasulo Sruthi	Nominated	
2013	CineMAA Awards	Promising Face of the Year	Siva Manasulo Sruthi	Won	
2013	Hyderabad Times Film Awards	Promising Newcomer – Female	Siva Manasulo Sruthi	Won	
2016	Zee Telugu Apsara Awards	Rising Star of the Year	Subramanyam for Sale	Nominated	
2016	Zee Telugu Apsara Awards	Youth Icon of the Year	—N/a	Nominated	
2016	Zee Telugu Apsara Awards	Entertainer of the Year	—N/a	Won	
2017	South Indian International Movie Awards	Best Actress – Telugu	Jyo Achyutananda	Nominated	
2021	South Indian International Movie Awards	Best Actor in a Negative Role – Telugu	Evaru	Nominated	
2022	Filmfare OTT Awards	Best Supporting Actress – Drama Series	Rocket Boys	Nominated	
2023	Indian Television Academy Awards	Best Actress - Drama (OTT)	Jaanbaaz Hindustan Ke	Nominated	

== See also ==
- List of Tamil film actresses
- List of Telugu film actresses
- List of Hindi film actresses
