= Rasavathi =

2024 film directed by Santhakumar

- Theatrical release poster
- Directed by: Santhakumar
- Written by: Santhakumar
- Produced by: Santhakumar
- Starring: Arjun Das; Tanya Ravichandran; Reshma Venkatesh; Sujith Shankar
- Cinematography: Saravanan Ilavarasu; Shiva GRN
- Edited by: V. J. Sabu Joseph
- Music by: S. Thaman
- Production companies: DNA Mechanic Company; Saraswathi Cine Creations
- Distributed by: Sakthi Film Factory
- Release date: 10 May 2024
- Country: India
- Language: Tamil

Rasavathi: The Alchemist is a 2024 Indian Tamil-language romantic action thriller film written, produced and directed by Santhakumar. It stars Arjun Das, Tanya Ravichandran, Reshma Venkatesh, and Sujith Shankar in lead roles. The soundtrack and background score were composed by S. Thaman, while the cinematography and editing were handled by Saravanan Ilavarasu and Shiva GRN, and V. J. Sabu Joseph.

It was extensively shot in Kodaikanal, Madurai, Cuddalore and Palani.

It theatrically released on 10 May 2024. The film received positive reviews from critics and audiences.

== Plot ==
Rasavathi is a Tamil romantic action thriller that follows Sadhasiva Pandian, a reclusive Siddha doctor with a traumatic past, who finds solace and love with Surya, a hotel manager also healing from her own scars, in the serene hills of Kodaikanal. Their peaceful life is disrupted by the arrival of Inspector Parasuraj, a volatile and obsessive police officer who has a deeply troubling and vengeful connection to Sadhasiva's past, leading to a psychological cat-and-mouse game as the truth behind their intertwined lives slowly unravels.

== Cast ==
- Arjun Das as Sadhasiva "Sadha" Pandian
- Tanya Ravichandran as Surya
- Reshma Venkatesh as Chandra
- Sujith Shankar as Inspector Parasuraj "Parasu"
- G. M. Sundar as Police Inspector
- Sujatha Sivakumar as Sadhasiva's mother
- Ramya Subramanian as Dr. Sailaja
- Rishikanth
- Arul Jothi
- Deepa
- Nikhila Shankar as Sadhasiva's sister

== Production ==
=== Development ===
The film was produced by Santhakumar under his own banner DNA mechanic company Production No. 1 on 5 August 2023, the film's official title was unveiled as Rasavathi by director Santhakumar.

=== Casting ===
Tanya Ravichandran and Reshma Venkatesh was cast in as the female lead opposite Arjun Das, marking their first collaboration. Sujith Shankar was reported to play a police officer and the main antagonist in the film while veteran actor G. M. Sundar and other actors and actresses like Ramya Subramanian, Sujatha Sivakumar and Rishikanth appear were cast in other pivotal roles.

=== Filming ===
Principal photography of the film began on 4 November 2022 and wrapped up on 5 August 2023.

== Music ==
The music and background score is composed by S. Thaman, in his third collaboration with Santhakumar after Mouna Guru (2011) and Magamuni (2019). The audio rights were acquired by Divo. The first single "Saaral Saaral" was released on 2 May 2024. The last single "Thai Thai (Rasavathi Fusion)" was released on 8 May 2024.

Track listing
No.	Title	Lyrics	Singer(s)	Length
1.	"Saaral Saaral"	Yugabharathi	S. Thaman; Lakshmi Meghana	3:07
2.	"Thai Thai" (Rasavathi Fusion)	Yugabharathi	S. Thaman; Roshini	4:10

== Release ==
=== Theatrical ===
Rasavathi was released in theatres on 10 May 2024.

== Reception ==
Manigandan KR of Times Now rated the film 3.5 stars out of 5 stars and noted "If you have the time and the patience for a good, meaningful story, then Rasavathi is definitely an option."

Roopa Radhakrishnan of The Times of India rated the film 2.5 stars out of 5 stars and noted "Rasavathi impressed with many fascinating characters. The makers have indeed created many intriguing characters but then failed to place them in a setting that is as compelling as them."

Jayabhuvaneshwari B of Cinema Express rated the film 2.5 stars out of 5 stars and noted "In the final act of the film, the pace picks up, drawing viewers to the edge of their seats as the reasons behind the protagonist-antagonist enmity are revealed."
