= Nirnayam =

Nirnayam (lit. 'decision' in Indian languages) may refer to:

- Nirnayam (1991 film), a Telugu film directed by Priyadarshan which is a remake of his own Vandanam
- Nirnayam (1995 film), a Malayalam film directed by Sangeeth Sivan
- Nirnayam (2013 film), a Tamil film

== See also ==
- Nirnayakam, a 2015 Indian film by V. K. Prakash
