= Tatineni Satya =

Indian filmmaker

- Education: Loyola College, Chennai
- Occupations: Film Director; Screenwriter
- Years active: 2010–present

Tatineni Satya is an Indian filmmaker who has worked in the Telugu film industry.

== Career ==
Satya is the grandson of film director T. Prakash Rao, who was active from the 1940s to the 1980s in the Telugu film industry and son of film director T. L. V. Prasad who became one of the famous directors for doing maximum films with Mithun Chakraborty within short span. Satya completed his schooling in Chennai and graduated from Loyola College, Chennai with a degree in visual communications. He then joined David Dhawan as an assistant for Jodi No.1 (2001) and continued to work with him for eight further films. Satya then worked as an assistant for a Tamil film, Kanda Naal Mudhal (2005) in the direction of Priya, before starting to prepare his own scripts. He first contacted producer R. B. Choudary to finance his scripts, but the producer wanted him to narrate scripts for his son Jiiva. Satya's script was about a psychotic character, and having seen Jiiva play similar psychotic characters in Raam (2005) and Katrathu Thamizh (2007), he was not keen to stereotype Jiiva in such roles. Despite the refusal, Choudary offered him the chance to begin his career instead by making Bheemili Kabaddi Jattu (2010), a remake of the successful Tamil film, Vennila Kabadi Kuzhu (2009). Satya subsequently moved to Hyderabad and started auditioning for new actors and doing demo shoots for the characters in the movie. The shooting of the movie was started in the month of August 2009 and finished by January 2010, taking around 54 working days. The film, starring Nani and Saranya Mohan, garnered critical and commercial acclaim. His next film Shiva Manasulo Shruti (2012), was also a remake of a popular Tamil film Siva Manasula Sakthi (2009). He then directed the Telugu remake of another popular Tamil film Mouna Guru (2011) titled Shankara which began production in 2014 but had a delayed release in 2016 and went unnoticed.

In 2015, he began working on a bilingual thriller film produced by and starring Sachiin J. Joshi titled Veedevadu in Telugu and Yaar Ivan in Tamil. The film took two years to complete production, with actress Esha Gupta, Prabhu and Kishore amongst others working on the film. It opened to mixed reviews in September 2017.

== Filmography ==
Year	Film	Notes
2010	Bheemili Kabaddi Jattu	Remake of Vennila Kabadi Kuzhu
2012	Siva Manasulo Sruthi	Remake of Siva Manasula Sakthi
2016	Shankara	Remake of Mouna Guru
2017	Veedevadu	Partially reshot in Tamil as Yaar Ivan
2026	Sathi Leelavathi	
