= Santhakumar =

Indian film director and screenwriter

- Occupation: Film director Screenwriter
- Years active: 2001-2004 (Assistant director); 2006-present

Santhakumar is an Indian director and screenwriter who predominantly works in Tamil cinema. He is known for directing Mounaguru (2011) and Magamuni (2019).

== Career ==
Santhakumar worked as an assistant director to Dharani for Dhill (2001), Dhool (2003) and Ghilli (2004) before commencing work on Mounaguru in 2006. Mounaguru notably featured no lip-sync songs, a staple of Indian films, as he felt that it would ruin the film's narrative. A ten-minute sequence featuring Arulnidhi on his knees took ten days to shoot. The film faced no significant competition during release and was a success. A critic wrote that the film "has everything that might count as a cliche but the marvel of it is that it never descends into mediocrity or becomes predictable". He commenced work for his next film Magamuni based on the two namesake characters in 2015, and first wrote Maga before Muni. Arya was cast in the titular roles after the producer suggested him after the script was finished, and Santhakumar decided to cast him after Arya was mentally strong and became a cyclist despite having a commercial failure. Regarding her character Deepa, Mahima Nambiar called her a female version of the director. Regarding the film, a critic wrote that "Director Santhakumar comes back to filmmaking after a eight-year gap [...] but has not lost touch with the craft, going by Magamuni. Not only is his story narrative unique, his writing of the various characters are also well fleshed out and detailed". Unlike his previous two films, he turned producer with Rasavathi (2024), which was not well received with a critic noting that "To call the film’s pacing slow is an understatement and it’s understandable given the wafer-thin plot, which the director tries to accentuate by adding more characters that in turn lead to more scenes".

== Personal life ==
He studied at American College, Madurai. Between films, Santhakumar likes to do solo traveling for soul searching and writing.

== Filmography ==
List of Santhakumar film credits
Year	Title	Credited as			Notes
Year	Title	Director	Writer	Producer	Notes
2011	Mounaguru	Yes	Yes	No	
2019	Magamuni	Yes	Yes	No	
2024	Rasavathi	Yes	Yes	Yes	
