= Sathi Leelavathi (2026 film) =

2026 Indian Telugu film by Tatineni Satya

- Theatrical release poster
- Directed by: Tatineni Satya
- Screenplay by: Tatineni Satya
- Produced by: M. Naga Mohanbabu
- Starring: Lavanya Tripathi; Dev Mohan
- Cinematography: Binendra Menon
- Edited by: Sathish Suriya
- Music by: Mickey J. Meyer
- Production company: Durga Devi Pictures
- Release date: 8 May 2026
- Running time: 131 minutes
- Country: India
- Language: Telugu

Sathi Leelavathi (transl. Leelavathi, the chaste wife) is a 2026 Indian Telugu-language romantic comedy film co-written and directed by Tatineni Satya. The film stars Lavanya Tripathi and Dev Mohan. It was released on 8 May 2026.

== Cast ==
- Lavanya Tripathi as Leelavathi
- Dev Mohan as Ram Sethu
- Naresh as Leelavathi's father
- VTV Ganesh as Tamalapakulu
- Madonna Sebastian as Nichola Sebastian
- Saptagiri
- Rajendran
- Jaffer Sadiq
- Thagubothu Ramesh
- Joshi

== Music ==
The music was composed by Mickey J. Meyer. A single "Chittoor Pilla" was released in August 2025.

Track listing
No.	Title	Lyrics	Singer(s)	Length
1.	"Chittoor Pilla"	Vanamali	Nutana Mohan, Krishna Tejesvi, Ritesh G Rao	4:48
2.	"Madhuram"	Vanamali	Karthik, Charulatha Mani	4:16
3.	"Veluthunna Veluthunna"	Vanamali	Sameera Bharadwaj, Ritesh G Rao	4:49
4.	"Title Song"	Abhinaya Srinivas	Nutana Mohan	2:11
Total length:				16:04

== Release and reception ==
Sathi Leelavathi was released in theatres on 8 May 2026.

Suhas Sistu of The Hans India rated it 2.75 out of 5 and stated that the film "succeeds as a wholesome entertainer filled with clean humor, relatable marital emotions, and strong performances". Shreya Varanasi of The Times of India gave a rating of 2.5 out of 5 and felt that "uneven humour and scattered writing" are the film's negative aspects. A critic from Eenadu appreciated the cast performances and comedy in the second half but criticised the lack of novelty in the story and overstretched pacing.
