= Shivya Pathania =

Indian television actress

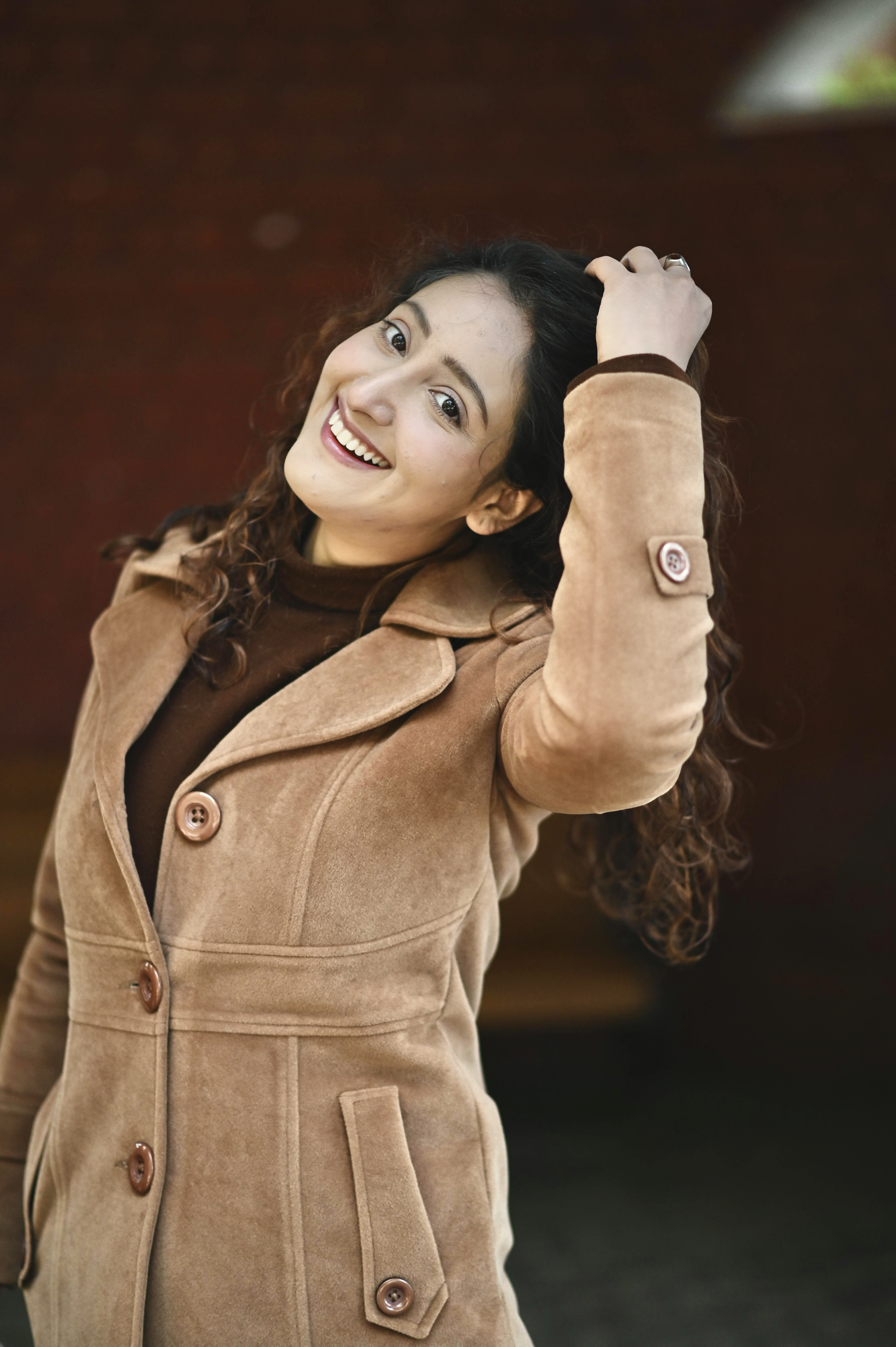
- Pathania in 2022
- Born: 26 July 1991 (age 35); Shimla, Himachal Pradesh, India
- Occupations: Actress, model
- Years active: 2014–present
- Known for: "Humsafars"; Ram Siya Ke Luv Kush; RadhaKrishn; Lakshmi Narayan – Sukh Samarthya Santulan
- Title: Miss Shimla (2013)

Shivya Pathania (born 26 July 1991) is an Indian actress who primarily works in Hindi television. Pathania is widely known for her portrayal of Sita in Ram Siya Ke Luv Kush, Radha in RadhaKrishn and Lakshmi in Lakshmi Narayan – Sukh Samarthya Santulan.

== Early life ==
Shivya is born and brought in Shimla, Himachal Pradesh. She has pursued BTech from Chitkara University. Her father, Subhash Pathania, was a law officer in the Labour and Employment Department in Chaura Maidan, Shimla and now is a practising Lawyer.

== Career ==
Before acting, Shivya was crowned Miss Shimla 2013 at the International Summer Festival which took place in Shimla. Pathania also won Miss Oye and Miss Beautiful Smile.

A year later, she debuted in television playing Arzoo Sahir Azeem Chaudhary in Humsafars opposite Harshad Chopda. In 2016, she played Zara Khan in Yeh Hai Aashiqui and gained wide praise for portraying Sanchi Mittal in Sony's Ek Rishta Saajhedari Ka, co-starring Kinshuk Vaidya.

From 2017 to 2018, Pathania appeared as Raavi Kaur in Zee TV's Dil Dhoondta Hai. She then starred as Radha in Star Bharat's RadhaKrishn opposite Himanshu Soni and appeared as Priya in &TV's Laal Ishq, followed by a cameo appearance in Vikram Betaal Ki Rahasya Gatha.

Next, she portrayed Sita in Colors TV's Ram Siya Ke Luv Kush from 2019 to 2020, again opposite Himanshu Soni.

== Filmography ==
=== Television ===
| Year | Title | Role | Notes | Ref. |
|---|---|---|---|---|
| 2014–2015 | Humsafars | Arzoo Sahir Chaudhary/ Arzoo Nausheen Khan | Lead Role | |
| 2016–2017 | Ek Rishta Saajhedari Ka | Sanchi Aryan Sethia/Malavika Sehgal | Lead Role | |
| 2016 | The Kapil Sharma Show | Sanchi Mittal | Guest | |
| 2016 | Yeh Hai Aashiqui | Zara Khan | Episode: "Saving Zara" | Episodic appearance |
| 2017–2018 | Dil Dhoondta Hai | Raavi Dalvi | Lead role | |
| 2017 | Love On the Run | Sanjana | Episodic appearance | |
| 2018 | RadhaKrishn | Radha | Lead Role | |
| 2018 | Laal Ishq | Priya | Episode: "Paapi Gudda" | |
| 2019 | Vikram Betaal Ki Rahasya Gatha | Lakshmi/Gayatri | Cameo | |
| 2019–2020 | Ram Siya Ke Luv Kush | Sita | Lead Role | |
| 2021–2022 | Baal Shiv – Mahadev Ki Andekhi Gatha | Devi Parvati | Lead Role | |
| 2023 | Teri Meri Doriyaann | Shanaya | Cameo Role | |
| 2024 | Shiv Shakti – Tap Tyaag Tandav | Lakshmi | Supporting Role | |
| 2024 | Lakshmi Narayan – Sukh Samarthya Santulan | Mahalakshmi | Lead Role | |

=== Web series ===
| Year | Title | Role | Notes | Ref. |
|---|---|---|---|---|
| 2022 | Shoorveer | Preeti Sood | | |

=== Films ===
| Year | Title | Role | Co-Star | Notes | Ref. |
|---|---|---|---|---|---|
| 2026 | Sirf Aapke † | Lead | Pawan Singh | First Lead Movie | |

=== Music videos ===
| Year | Title | Singer(s) | Ref. |
|---|---|---|---|
| 2021 | Bhool | Sanjana Devarajan, Mayur Jumani | |
| 2022 | Fidaa | Dharampreet Gill | |
