= Shankara (2016 film) =

2016 action film by Tatineni Satya

- Poster
- Directed by: Tatineni Satya
- Produced by: R. V. Chandramouli Prasad
- Starring: Nara Rohit; Regina Cassandra
- Cinematography: T. Surendra Reddy
- Edited by: Kotagiri Venkateswara Rao
- Music by: Sai Karthik
- Production company: Sri Leela Movies
- Release date: 21 October 2016
- Country: India
- Language: Telugu

Shankara is a 2016 Indian Telugu-language action film directed by Tatineni Satya and produced by R. V. Chandramouli Prasad under the Sri Leela Movies banner. Nara Rohit and Regina Cassandra play the lead roles in this film. It is a remake of the Tamil film Mouna Guru.

== Plot ==
Shankar finds it difficult to adjust with the society that he lives. As a result, he is unable to control his anger and ends up with trouble. His unpredictable behavior becomes a constant worry for his mother and brother. A series of incidents force him to leave his hometown and end up in Hyderabad. Despite scoring high marks in school, he joins a local arts college in the city and stays in a hostel, where trouble begins. Medical student Ananya is the younger sister of Shankar's sister in-law, and she has had soft corner for Sankar. Meanwhile, rogue Assistant Commissioner Prasad, Inspector Rajeev, Sub-Inspector Narasimha, and Head Constable Swamy witness a car accident in the outskirts of Hyderabad. When they are about to take the victim to a nearby hospital, they come across a huge stash of cash. The ACP kill the half-dead victim and flee to Hydrabad with the money. However, Maya, a Harlot, finds the truth by overhearing Prasad's telephone conversation and video records it. When Maya plans to threaten Prasad, she accidentally loses her camera which had the video footage. The next day, Prasad gets a threatening call from a guy and finds out that it was Maya who recorded his conversation. An angered Prasad beats up Maya and eventually kills her.

A sincere Superintendent of Police named Rajeswari takes up this case. In the college where Shankar studies, there is a series of thefts happening in the hostel which blames a pune in the hostel leads to his suicide.

Meanwhile, Prasad finds out that it was one of the college students who had actually stolen Maya's camera and threatened him. One night, a bag containing all the stolen items is kept in front of Shankar's hostel room, making him the prime suspect of all the thefts, after finding the camera in the stolen items Narasimha and Swamy conforms he is the blackmailer and arrested him without any warning.

Then on Prasad orders, Rajeev joins with them, kidnaps Shankar and Maya's friends with plans of killing them in a forest. At the spot Rajeev lately suspects Shankar is innocent then to conform Narasimha and Swamy tries to reach Prasad due to out of signal. After sometime Prasad conforms that he is innocent and orders them to leave but they conforms that they killed one of the Maya's friend before him. Then Prasad orders them to kill Shankar. Then after receiving order from Prasad Rajeev kills the other friend of Maya and tries to kill Shankar but Shankar escapes from there and reaches to city.

Later is Shankar is Abducted again by Rajeev and falsely accused of mental instability by Prasad and his team of policemen and is institutionalised. Meanwhile, Ananya accidentally finds Shankar in the mental asylum on one of her practical sessions. After observing The Shankar is kept under constant sedation with the help of a corrupt doctor. They forge a story to make his family believe that he is suffering from a mental disorder which makes him think that he is being chased by a group of policemen for a fake encounter though Ananya was suspicious about this circumstance. Prasad plans to kill Shankar in the asylum which looks like a suicide. Then Shankar escapes from the mental asylum with the help of Ananya and one of the pune in the hospital later they bashes the doctor which reveals it was the plan of ACP and his team.

Later Shankar and Ananya reaches Rajeswari to take her help then the trio reaches Shankar's hostel to find evidence against Prasad and his team. Later Shankar kidnaps Rajeev and threatens him to become approver. However Rajeev being an honest and sincere cop and feeling guilty for his deeds ready to co-operate. Meanwhile, Rajeswari collects vital info and cracks the case. It is revealed that the person who stole Maya's camera was Dinesh, who happens to be the son of the college principal. Knowing this, the principal had tried to save his son by keeping all the stolen items in front of Shankar's room during vacation, so that honest Shankar will return the things and all will be done. But everything went wrong.

When Rajeswari corners and is about to arrest the culprits in the college old auditorium, she gets a call from the commissioner that the person murdered by Prasad and his team of policemen was a leading politician in Bangalore which could lead to state problems and hence does not disclose this to the media. Later Commissioner scolds ACP for making him believe that it was an accident and gave a share to him in that amount. Then the commissioner orders Prasad to kill all the witnesses and damage all evidences against ACP and his team.

Rajeswari is helpless and leaves the place which giving control to Shankar on the situation. Then Prasad abducts Shankar's brother and gravely injures him in front of Shankar threatens Shankar to surrender Rajeev to him for the sake of his family's life. Then he reaches his hideout along with an approved Rajeev and the fight ensues between with the evil trio which leads to death of swamy by ACP. Then Rajeev tries to make Narasimha realise that they are actually using by ACP to escape from the departmental enquiry by fabricating them in all of his murders. Then ACP shows his real face and kills Rajeev and forces Narasimha to kill Shankar. Then Shankar attacks the duo and kills both the cops.

Then Shankar is sentenced to psychological treatment (as he is falsely believed to have a mental disorder). After getting released, he marries Ananya and becomes a deaf-dumb school teacher.

== Cast ==
- Nara Rohit as Shankar
- Regina Cassandra as Ananya (Pappu)
- John Vijay as ACP Prasad
- Neelya as Maya
- Ahuti Prasad as College Principal and Dinesh's father
- M. S. Narayana as Lecturer
- Rajeev Kanakala as Inspector Rajeev
- Pragathi as Shankar's mother
- Chinna as Shankar's brother
- Rajashree as SP Rajeswari
- Dinesh as Dinesh
- Hazel Crowney as an item number

== Production ==
=== Filming ===
The film was launched on 24 January 2013 at the Prasad Labs. Ramesh Prasad gave the clap, Chamundeswarinath switched on the camera, and V. V. Vinayak directed the first shot. An item song was shot on British model-turned-actress Hazel Crowney, who has appeared in the Hindi films U Me Aur Hum and A Flat.

=== Casting ===
Nara Rohit and Regina play the lead and Ahuti Prasad, M. S. Narayana, Rajeev Kanakala and Pragathi are in other important roles in this film.

== Soundtrack ==
The Music was composed by Sai Karthik and released by Aditya Music.

Shankara

Soundtrack album by Sai Karthik
- Released: May 15, 2014
- Recorded: 2014
- Genre: Soundtrack
- Length: 16:15
- Label: Aditya Music
- Producer: Sai Karthik

Sai Karthik chronology
Selfie Raja (2016)	Shankara (2014)	Dwaraka (2016)

Track list
No.	Title	Lyrics	Singer(s)	Length
1.	"O Sharaba"	Abhinay Srinivas	Sai Karthik, Divija Karthik	1:32
2.	"Nee Pranam"	Balaji	Ranjith	4:12
3.	"Maradala Maradala"	Ramajogayya Sastry	Sai Karthik, Divija Karthik	3:25
4.	"Shankara"	Ramajogayya Sastry	Sai Charan, M. L. R. Karthikeyan	3:12
5.	"Yedalona"	Ramajogayya Sastry	Sameer	3:54
Total length:				16:15

== Reception ==
Srividya Palaparthi of The Times of India rated the film two-and-a-half out of five stars and wrote, "Shankara is a regular whodunit thriller with an interesting story which gets lost in a distracted narration. If you choose to go for it, which is quite unlikely, you won’t entirely regret it." K. Naresh Kumar of The Hans India wrote, "Despite finding it hard to believe that Rohith still plays college student roles, his dour performance actually aids the film’s pace as it unravels its interlinked narration of a student getting unwittingly sucked into a case of crime and passion."
