= List of children's television channels in South Asia =

This is a list of children's channels in South Asia.

== Bangladesh ==
Name	Launch	Language(s)	Owner
Duronto TV	15 October 2017	Bengali	Barind Media Limited

== India ==
The first kids channel launched in India was Cartoon Network which was launched on May 1, 1995.

Name	Launch	Closure	Language(s)	Owner
Cartoon Network	1 May 1995		Hindi Tamil; Telugu; Malayalam; Kannada; Marathi English	Warner Bros. Discovery India
Pogo TV	1 January 2004		Hindi Tamil; Telugu; Malayalam; Kannada; Marathi English	Warner Bros. Discovery India
Cartoon Network HD+	15 April 2018		Hindi Tamil; Telugu; Malayalam; Kannada; Marathi English	Warner Bros. Discovery India
Discovery Kids	7 August 2012		Hindi Tamil Telugu Kannada Malayalam	Warner Bros. Discovery India
Toonami	26 February 2015	15 May 2018	English Hindi	Warner Bros. Discovery India
Sony YAY!	18 April 2017		Hindi; Tamil; Telugu; Malayalam; Marathi; Bengali Kannada Odia	Sony Pictures Networks
Animax	4 July 2004	18 April 2017	English	Sony Pictures Networks
Disney Channel	17 December 2004		Tamil; Telugu; Hindi; English	Jio Star
Disney Channel HD	15 March 2023		Tamil; Telugu; Hindi; English	Jio Star
Disney Junior	15 October 2012		Tamil; Telugu; Hindi; English	Jio Star
Hungama TV	26 September 2004		Tamil; Telugu; Hindi; English	Jio Star
Super Hungama	1 March 2022		Tamil; Telugu; Hindi; English	Jio Star
Toon Disney	17 December 2004	14 November 2009	Tamil; Telugu; Hindi; English	Jio Star
Disney XD	14 November 2009	20 January 2019	Tamil; Telugu; Hindi; English	Jio Star
Marvel HQ	20 January 2019	1 March 2022	Tamil; Telugu; Hindi; English	Jio Star
Nickelodeon	16 October 1999		Hindi; Kannada Telugu Tamil; Malayalam; Bengali; Marathi	Jio Star
Nickelodeon Sonic	20 December 2011		Hindi; Kannada Telugu Tamil; Malayalam; Bengali; Marathi	Jio Star
Nick HD+	5 December 2015		English; Hindi	Jio Star
Nick Jr.	21 November 2012		English; Hindi	Jio Star
CBeebies	July 2020		English	BBC
Chithiram TV	3 June 2010	13 December 2022	Tamil	Kalaignar TV Network
Chutti TV	29 April 2007		Tamil	Sun TV Network
Kochu TV	16 October 2011		Malayalam	Sun TV Network
Kushi TV	2009		Telugu	Sun TV Network
Chintu TV	2009		Kannada	Sun TV Network
Rongeen TV	12 June 2019		Bengali	Biswas Media Solutions
EPIC KIDS	14 November 2020		Hindi Malayalam Kannada Tamil Telugu	IN10 Media Network
ETV Bal Bharat	27 April 2021		Hindi; English; Tamil; Telugu; Malayalam; Marathi; Bengali; Kannada; Gujarathi; Odia; Assamese; Punjabi	Ramoji Group
Maha Cartoon TV	1 November 2016	1 March 2019	Hindi	
Splash Channel	17 August 2001	2009	Hindi	Pentamedia Graphics; Mayajaal Entertainment
Spacetoon India	14 January 2009	13 March 2013	English Hindi	Kids Media India (KMI)
ZeeQ	5 November 2012	1 June 2017	English Hindi Telugu	Zee Entertainment Enterprises
Da Vinci Learning	18 November 2015	30 November 2017	English	Da Vinci Media

== Pakistan ==
Name	Launch	Language(s)	Owner
Cartoon Network	2 April 2004	Urdu; English	WarnerMedia Entertainment Networks Asia Pacific/M/s. Information & Systems Corp. (Pvt.) Ltd.
Nickelodeon	23 November 2006	Urdu; English	ARY Digital Network
CBeebies	19 July 2008	Urdu; English	BBC Asia
Pop	3 June 2018	Urdu; English	Edutainment (Pty.) Ltd
Kids Zone	18 December 2018	Urdu; English	Mediacon Network Pvt. Ltd./Kids Network Television LLC
Cinemachi Kids	30 September 2016	Urdu; English	Ironline Production (Pvt.) Ltd./Mimyuni Media Entertainment
Baby TV	4 December 2003	Urdu; English	
Champion TV	19 April 2020	Urdu; English	M/s. Media Roots (Pvt.) Limited

== Sri Lanka ==
Name	Launch	Language(s)	Owner
A+ Kids TV	July 2017	Sinhala	Kidzy

== Programming blocks ==
=== India ===
Name	Channel	Year(s)
Toonami	Cartoon Network	2001–2010
Boomerang	Cartoon Network	2007
Disney	DD National	1994
Disney Jadoo	DD National	2005
Cartoon Network Ki Duniya	DD National	2006–2007
Discovery Kids	Discovery Channel	2001–2005
Playhouse Disney	Disney Channel	2006–2011
Disney Junior	Disney Channel	2011–present
Disney Sandhya	ETV	1999–2000
TeenNick	Nick Jr.	2012–2017
Nick Hour	Rishtey	2016–present
Toon Time	SAB TV	2001–2002
Just Kids!	Sahara One	2002–2005
Spacetoon Hour	Sahara One	2005–2006
Sunday Funday	Sony Aath	2015–present
Good Morning Disney	Sony Entertainment Television	2000–2003
Disney Hour	Sony Entertainment Television	2000–2003
Animax Kool Kidz	Sony Entertainment Television	2004–2005
Jetix Action Station	Star One	2005–2009
Fox Kids	StarPlus	2001–2004
Disney Time	StarPlus	2005–2010
Disney	Star Utsav	2005–2009
Jetix	Toon Disney	2004–2009
Good Morning Disney	Zee TV	1994–1999
Disney Hour	Zee TV	1994–1999
Nickelodeon	Zee TV	1999–2002
Cartoon Network	Zee TV	2002–2003
Disney	Zee Bangla	2000–2001
Disney	Zee Gujarati	2000–2001
Disney	Zee Marathi	2000–2001
Disney	Zee Punjabi	2000–2001
CBeebies	ZeeQ	2013–2017

=== Pakistan ===
Name	Channel	Year(s)
Pogo	Cartoon Network	2008–present
CNP Movies	Cartoon Network	2004–present
It's All About Action	Cartoon Network	2016–2021
Toontastic Weekends	Cartoon Network	2020–2021
Get Set Go!	CBeebies	2008–present.
Discover and Do!	CBeebies	2008–present.
Big Fun Time!	CBeebies	2008–present.
Bedtime Hour	CBeebies	2008–present.
