= Shoorveer =

Indian action thriller television series

- Promotional poster
- Genre: Action thriller; Drama
- Created by: Samar Khan
- Starring: Manish Chaudhary; Armaan Ralhan; Regina Cassandra; Aadil Khan; Makrand Deshpande; Shivya Pathania; Arif Zakaria
- Country of origin: India
- Original language: Hindi
- No. of seasons: 1

Production
- Producers: Aditya Pittie; Samar Khan
- Cinematography: Pratik Deora
- Editor: Shakti Hasija
- Running time: 30–40 minutes
- Production company: Juggernaut Productions

Original release
- Network: Disney+ Hotstar
- Release: 15 July 2022

Shoorveer is an Indian Hindi language action thriller television series created by Samar Khan and directed by Kanishk Varma. It features Manish Chaudhari,Regina Cassandra, Armaan Ralhan, Aadil Khan, Makarand Deshpande, Shivya Pathania and Arif Zakaria in the lead roles with an ensemble cast. The series is made under the banner of Juggernaut Productions.

The series premiered on 15 July 2022 on Disney+ Hotstar.

== Cast ==
- Manish Chaudhari as Group Captain Ranjan Malik, head of the Hawks program
- Regina Cassandra as Flient Lieutenant Avantika Rao
- Armaan Ralhan as Viraj Sehgal, a pilot and Satish's son
- Aadil Khan as Squadron Leader Salim Kamali, Preeti's love interest
- Makarand Deshpande as NSA Milind Phanse
- Shivya Pathania as Preeti Sood, Salim's love interest
- Arif Zakaria as Pakistan General Riaz Ahmed
- Abhishek Saha
- Harman Singha as Dev, Viraj's friend
- Jiten Lalwani as Shekhar Sen
- Mohit Chauhan as PM Chandrashekhar Pratap
- Amit Behl as Satish Barot, Viraj's estranged father
- Preeti Gupta as Roma Sood
- Kashmira Irani as Sarah, Sidhesh's partner
- Anjali Barot as Manju Thapliyal
- Kuldeep Sareen as Jaspreet Bhatti
- Faisal Rashid as ISI agent Sidhesh Vakharia
- Sahil Mehta as Captain Perry Mehta
- Roopa Divatia as Salon's mother
