= Agathinai =

2015 Indian film by U. P. Maruthu

- Theatrical release poster
- Directed by: U. P. Maruthu
- Produced by: T. R. Srikanth
- Starring: Mahima; Aadukalam Naren; Varma
- Cinematography: V. Akhilan
- Edited by: G. Sasikumar
- Music by: Maria Manohar
- Production company: Sri Harini Pictures
- Release date: 20 March 2015
- Running time: 134 minutes
- Country: India
- Language: Tamil

Agathinai is a 2015 Indian Tamil-language romantic drama film starring Mahima, Aadukalam Naren and newcomer Varma. The film follows the bond between a father and his daughter.

== Plot ==
The daughter, Karthika, and her father develop a close relationship after the mother passes away. The daughter falls in love with a man, Ayyanaar, who is also a servant who works for Karthika's family, after he saves her one-day when she falls in a well while riding on her motorcycle. However, the daughter is engaged to another man. Whom she marries and the issues that arise forms the rest of the story.

== Cast ==
- Mahima as Karthika
- Aadukalam Naren as Karthika's father
- Varma as Ayyanaar
- G. M. Kumar as Ayyanaar's father
- Nalini as Vishnu's mother
- Rajashree
- Senthi Kumari as Deivanai
- T. R. Srikanth as Adhilingam
- Ramachandran Durairaj
- Benito as Vishnu
- Black Pandi as Vishnu's friend
- George Maryan as Muthaiah
- Swaminathan as Mani
- Halwa Vasu as Chokka
- Siva Narayana Murthy
- Lollu Sabha Manohar
- Pakoda Pandi as Ayyanaar's friend
- Namitha Marimuthu as Kilipula

== Production ==
The film is directed by Maruthu, who previously was a director for the television series Athipookal. Actor Varma and Mahima and Aadukalam Naren were signed to enact the lead roles. The film is a love story that is intended to be family friendly since the film is sans inappropriate content. Mahima plays Naren's daughter in the film, which is set in a village near Karaikudi. Varma made his film debut with this film.

== Soundtrack ==
The songs were composed by Maria Manohar. All of the songs from the film were written by Vairamuthu.

- "Thanthaiyum Neeye, Thaai Madi Neeye" - Maria Manohar, Sruthi Jeyamoorthy
- "Ilaigalile Sadugudu Nadathuthu" - Maria Manohar, Shakthisree Gopalan
- "Adiye Kadhaliye" - Maria Manohar, Haricharan
- "Munthaanai Selakulle" - Maria Maonhar, Velmurugan, Akshaya

== Release ==
A critic from The New Indian Express wrote that "With very few moments to relish, the film is an average entertainer". A critic from Maalai Malar praised the performances of the lead cast, the story, the music, and the cinematography. A critic from iFlicks opined that "Having chosen a casual village story director U.P.Maruthu has roped in a perfect cast but he could have concentrated more on the climax".
