= Little Hearts (2024 film) =

- Theatrical release poster
- Directed by: Anto Jose Pereira; Aby Treesa Paul
- Written by: Rajesh Pinnadan
- Story by: Anto Jose Pereira; Aby Treesa Paul
- Produced by: Sandra Thomas; Wilson Thomas
- Starring: Shane Nigam; Mahima Nambiar; Baburaj; Aima Rosmy Sebastian; Shine Tom Chacko; Shammi Thilakan
- Cinematography: Luke Jose
- Edited by: Noufal Abdullah
- Music by: Kailas Menon
- Production company: Sandra Thomas Productions
- Distributed by: Million Dreams
- Release date: 7 June 2024
- Running time: 134 minutes
- Country: India
- Language: Malayalam

Little Hearts is a 2024 Malayalam-language romantic black comedy film directed by Aby Treesa Paul and Anto Jose Pereira, written by Rajesh Pinnadan and produced by Sandra Thomas Productions. The film features Shane Nigam and Mahima Nambiar in the lead roles. The soundtrack and background score were composed by Kailas Menon, while the cinematography and editing were handled by Luke Jose and Noufal Abdullah.

Little Hearts was theatrically released on 7 June 2024 to mixed reviews from critics.

== Synopsis ==
Sibi and his father Baby manage a cardamom estate for their family friend Johnson and assist with his family's needs. During this time, Sibi and Baby both enter romantic relationships. Additionally, Sibi informs Johnson's parents about their son's planned wedding.

== Cast ==
- Shane Nigam as Sibi
- Mahima Nambiar as Sosha
- Baburaj as Baby
- Shine Tom Chacko as Sharon
- Jaffer Idukki as Paappan
- Parvathy Babu as Paappan's daughter
- Aima Rosmy Sebastian
- Ramya Suvi as Cicily
- Renji Panicker as Johnson
- Maala Parvathy as Anita
- Shammi Thilakan as Joy
- John Kaippallil as Rony
- Joardy Poonjar as Kurikasoe
- Thomas Joseph As Priest
- Arun Ajikumar as Power Bhai

== Production ==
The film is written by Rajesh Pinnadan, known for his work on Vilayath Buddha and Oru Thekkan Thallu Case. The film marks the reunion of Shane Nigam, Mahima Nambiar, Aima Rosmy Sebastian and Maala Parvathi who were the characters in RDX: Robert Dony Xavier. Sandra Thomas and Wilson Thomas served as joint producers under the banner Sandra Thomas Productions.

== Music ==
The songs and background score for the film were composed by Kailas Menon. The audio rights were acquired by Sony Music India. The first single "Edan Poove" was released on 16 January 2024. The second single "Naam Chernna Vazhikalil" was released on 4 April 2024. The third single "Aanne" was released on 1 June 2024. The fourth single "Simple Song" was released on 8 June 2024, after the film's release. The fifth single "Oru Sayahnam" was released on 17 June 2024, after the film's release. The sixth single "Chimmathe" was released on 28 June 2024.

Track listing
No.	Title	Lyrics	Singer(s)	Length
1.	"Edan Poove"	Vinayak Sasikumar	Kapil Kapilan; Sanah Moidutty	4:26
2.	"Naam Chernna Vazhikalil"	B. K. Harinarayanan	Vijay Yesudas; Judith Ann	3:00
3.	"Aanne"	Dabzee; Athul Narukara	Dabzee; Athul Narukara; Sruthy Sivadas	3:25
4.	"Simple Song"	B. K. Harinarayanan; Shabareesh Varma	Shabareesh Varma; Aravind Dileep Nair	3:46
5.	"Oru Sayahnam"	Vinayak Sasikumar	Vijay Prakash	3:25
6.	"Chimmathe"	Vivek Muzhakkunnu	Indrajith Sukumaran	2:28

== Release ==
=== Theatrical ===
Little Hearts was released in theatres on 7 June 2024.

== Reception ==
=== Critical response ===
Rohit Panikker of Times Now gave 3.5/5 stars and wrote, "Little Hearts is a fun and light comedy entertainer that delivers exactly what it promises. It's complete with laugh out loud moments and some hilarious performances, which are best experienced with a crowd in a packed theatre". Anna Mathews of The Times of India gave 2.5/5 stars and wrote, "The film directed and co-written by Aby Treesa Paul, Anto Jose Periera, along with Rajesh Pinnadan, who also shares a writing credit, could have been a sweet enough, feel-good romance with some good lessons for the audience, but it needed a proper tightening at the writing and making stages. As it is now, the key moments feel lost as the story progresses, particularly with a messy resolution. Sanjith Sidhardhan of OTTplay gave 2/5 stars and wrote, "Shane Nigam’s film could have easily been trimmed by a good 15 minutes and would have been a time-pass movie. It’s one of those films that is watchable and yet you tend to immediately forget once it’s over". Vignesh Madhu of The New Indian Express gave 2/5 stars and wrote, "With an efficient cast and a potential premise, Little Hearts had it all to be a meaningful entertainer, yet settles for the bare minimum. Little Hearts is half-hearted, despite having its heart at the right place".

Anandu Suresh of The Indian Express gave 1.5/5 stars and wrote, "While Luke Jose’s cinematography and Noufal Abdullah’s editing are competent in many instances, they never push the movie beyond a certain level of impact". S. R. Praveen of The Hindu wrote, "One wishes filmmakers do not further muddle issues about which misconceptions are galore in the society, through their half-baked handling of it".

== Controversies ==
The film was banned from screening in GCC countries because one the three love stories in the film one deals with a homosexual individual, queer identity, and the struggle for social acceptance of homosexual relationships and marriages in Indian society.

KCBC Jagratha Commission News, a publication of the Kerala Catholic Bishops’ Council (KCBC) censured the film as "Immoral ideas hatched in anti-Christianity". The Commission criticized film for the promotion of homosexual love affair and extramarital affair, as the film's female and male protagonists supports and paves the path for such affairs respectively in the story. The Commission alleged that the film is purposely and selectively setting the anti-Christian elements of the story in a Christian background, as homosexual marriage and homosexuality are strongly opposed by the Christian community, because they are objectively disordered, and Church disapproves of such unnatural tendencies, saying even as it calls for humane treatment of the individuals involved.

During the promotional interview of the film Shane Nigam humorously mocks actor Unni Mukundan it creates lot of trouble through social media by the fans of the actor and later Shane Nigam apologize for his words and problem was solved.
