= Siva Manasulo Sruthi =

2012 film by Tatineni Satya

- Theatrical release poster
- Directed by: Tatineni Satya
- Screenplay by: Tatineni Satya
- Story by: M. Rajesh
- Produced by: Vikram Raju
- Starring: Sudheer Babu; Regina Cassandra
- Cinematography: Chitti Babu.K
- Edited by: Sathish Suriya
- Music by: V. Selvaganesh; Yuvan Shankar Raja (unc.)
- Production company: Vega Entertainment Pvt Ltd
- Release date: 10 February 2012
- Running time: 146 minutes
- Country: India
- Language: Telugu

Siva Manasulo Sruthi (abbreviated as SMS) is a 2012 Indian Telugu-language romantic comedy film which is a remake of the successful 2009 Tamil film Siva Manasula Sakthi directed by M. Rajesh. The film is directed by Tatineni Satya and produced by Vikram Raju under Vega Entertainment. It stars Sudheer Babu and Regina Cassandra (in her Telugu debut).

== Synopsis ==
Siva is a carefree young man who works in a courier company as a delivery boy. During a train journey, he comes across Sruthi, who works as a radio jockey. Siva instantly falls for Sruthi and he starts trying to impress her. Sruthi reluctantly starts reciprocating his love over time. But just as Sruthi is about to express her love, Siva breaks her heart with his careless nature and uncultured ways. A love-hate relationship begins as the story moves back and forth between love failure and success. Jealousy, possessiveness and anger rear their ugly heads. Towards the end, the movie takes an unexpected twist. Siva and Sruthi are forced to take a stand over their future. What they will do forms the story.

== Cast ==
- Sudheer Babu as Siva
- Regina Cassandra as Sruthi
- Chanti as Siva's friend
- Vennela Kishore as Sruthi's brother
- Y. Kasi Viswanath as Sruthi's father
- Mirchi Hemanth (Guest appearance)
- Rohini as Siva's mother
- Raghuvaran as Siva's father (photographic appearance)
- Subbaraju as Police Officer (cameo)
- Thagubothu Ramesh
- Harsha Vardhan
- Priyanka Nalkari as Siva's Sister

== Release and reception ==
The film was released in India and overseas on 10 February 2012. The movie was received with positive reviews. Suresh Kavirayani of the Times of India gave a 3 out of 5 rating and said the film was fresh and Sudheer's acting was appreciable. Jeevi from Idlebrain gave a positive 3 out of 5 rating for the movie and said that the youth orientation and entertainment in the film make it a decent watch and categorized performances by Sudheer and Regina as plus points for the film. Reviewer's from NDTV gave a positive review and said it was a good beginning for Sudheer and praised his ease in dance and action scenes. They also praised Regina's performance in the film. The Hindustan Times gave a 3 out of 5 rating and said that the film is a time pass watch and is worth every single penny that was spent on buying the ticket.

== Music ==
Siva Manasulo Sruthi

Soundtrack album by V. Selvaganesh
- Released: 13 January 2012
- Producer: V. Selvaganesh

The film music was composed by V. Selvaganesh. The songs "Cheliya" and the "Theme of SMS" were retained from the original soundtrack of Siva Manasula Sakthi composed by Yuvan Shankar Raja.

| No | Title | Lyrics | Singers | Notes |
|---|---|---|---|---|
| 1 | "Idhi Nijamey" | | Karthik, Ranina Reddy | Remix of "Vizhigalile" song from Kullanari Kootam |
| 2 | "Cheeky Cheeky Babay" | Vanamali | Chaitra, Anuj Gurwara, Hemachandra | |
| 3 | "Mid Night" | Krishna Chaitanya | Ranjith, Krishna Iyer | |
| 4 | "Cheliya" | Vanamali | Vijay Prakash | Reused song "Oru Kal Oru Kannadi" from Siva Manasula Sakthi |
| 5 | "Osi Penki Pilla" | Krishna Chaitanya | Shankar Mahadevan, Sumitra Iyer | |
| 6 | "Theme Of SMS" | | Hemachandra | Reused song "Oru Paarvaiyil" from Siva Manasula Sakthi |

== Awards and nominations ==
| Ceremony | Category | Nominee | Result |
|---|---|---|---|
| 2nd South Indian International Movie Awards | SIIMA Award for Best Male Debut (Telugu) | Sudheer Babu | Won |
| 2nd South Indian International Movie Awards | SIIMA Award for Best Female Debut (Telugu) | Regina Cassandra | Won |
| 2nd South Indian International Movie Awards | Best Debutant Producer | Vikram Raju | Nominated |
