= Utsavam (2024 film) =

2024 Indian Drama film

- Theatrical release poster
- Directed by: Arjun Sai
- Written by: Arjun Sai
- Produced by: Suresh Patil
- Starring: Dilip Prakash; Regena Cassandrra; Prakash Raj; Rajendra Prasad; Nassar; Brahmanandam; Ali
- Cinematography: Rasool Ellore
- Edited by: Kotagiri Venkateswara Rao
- Music by: Anup Rubens
- Production company: Hornbill Pictures
- Release date: 13 September 2024
- Country: India
- Language: Telugu

Utsavam is a 2024 Indian Telugu-language family drama film directed by Arjun Sai in his directorial debut. Produced by Suresh Patil under Hornbill Pictures, The film stars newcomer Dilip Prakash and Regena Cassandrra in the lead roles with Rajendra Prasad, Prakash Raj, Brahmanandam, Ali, and Nassar. Utsavam was released on 13 September 2024.

== Plot ==
The film follows the story of Krishna (Dilip Prakash), a passionate individual determined to revive the age-old tradition of theater plays in modern times. Set against the backdrop of the Surabhi Natakalu—a legendary form of Telugu theater—the film delves into Krishna's journey to bring this art form back to life. Alongside his love interest, Rama (Regina Cassandra), and guided by his father, Abhimanyu Narayan (Prakash Raj), Krishna faces numerous challenges as he strives to uphold the legacy of theater. The film combines love, drama, and a deep respect for cultural heritage, presenting a heartfelt narrative about preserving art in the face of modernity.

== Cast ==
- Dilip Prakash as Krishna Abhimanyu
- Regena Cassandrra as Rama
- Rajendra Prasad as Aaradhyulu
- Prakash Raj as Abhimanyu Narayana
- Brahmanandam as Guinness Book Panthulu
- Ali as Naradhudu
- Nassar as Mahadev Nayudu
- Raghu Babu as Raju Garu
- L. B. Sriram
- Anish Kuruvilla
- Priyadarshi Pulikonda as Software CEO
- Prema
- Aamani
- Sudha

== Production ==
Utsavam marks the directorial debut of Arjun Sai, who also penned the script. Suresh Patil produces the film under Hornbill Pictures, a production house known for backing content-driven cinema. Rasool Ellore handles the film's cinematography, while the music is composed by Anup Rubens. The movie's soundtrack features a mix of romantic and thematic songs, with contributions from prominent lyricists like Anantha Sriram, Vanamali, and Bhaskarabhatla. The film's editing is done by Kotagiri Venkateswara Rao. The film has been in the making since 2022.

On 22 May 2023, Utsavam team wraps up post-production work. On 26 January 2024, the makers officially unveiled the first look poster of the film on the occasion of Republic Day, and on 28 January 2024, the teaser of the film was released.

== Soundtrack ==
The music of Utsavam has been well-received, with singles like "First Kiss" and "Marriages Are Made in Heaven" gaining popularity. The songs, sung by artists like Armaan Malik, Ram Miriyala, and Anurag Kulkarni, showcase a blend of various musical styles, ranging from youthful, groovy beats to traditional Carnatic influences.

Utsavam track listing
No.	Title	Lyrics	Singer(s)	Length
1.	"First Kiss"	Anantha Sriram	Ram Miriyala	4:24
2.	"Marriages Are Made in Heaven"	Anantha Sriram	Armaan Malik	3:34

== Release and reception ==
The film was theatrically released on 13 September 2024, with Mythri Movie Distributors handling distribution across Andhra Pradesh and Telangana, and Hombale Films for Karnataka.

A critic from The Times of India rated the film two-and-a-half out of five stars and wrote that "With its heart in the right place, Utsavam is a tribute to traditional Telugu theatre and an earnest attempt to draw attention to a fading art form. While the core premise is strong, the execution is uneven, and the romance feels clichéd at times". A critic from The Hans India rated the film three out of five and wrote that "Utsavam" is an emotional ode to theatre alone, a balancing act between tradition and innovation. Though not a perfect film, it is an important film as it shows the struggles of artists in a commercialized world".
