= Dil Dhoondta Hai =

- Genre: Soap opera
- Created by: Nitin Vaidya
- Creative director: ANISH N SURANA
- Country of origin: India
- Original language: Hindi
- No. of seasons: 1
- No. of episodes: 77

Production
- Producer: Nitin Vaidya
- Production locations: Mumbai, India
- Cinematography: Thomas A. Xavier
- Camera setup: Multi-camera
- Production company: Dashami Creations

Original release
- Network: Zee TV
- Release: 21 September 2017 – 12 January 2018

Dil Dhoondta Hai is an Indian Hindi romantic drama television series, which premiered on September 21, 2017 and aired on Zee TV (now available on ZEE5). The series was produced by Dashami Creations of Nitin Vaidya. The series aired on weekday's at 10:30pm. Stavan Shinde & Shivya Pathania played the main characters and Ashish Dixit & Pratiksha Jadhav in Second Pivotal lead role. it was replaced by Aap Ke Aa Jane Se in its time slot.

== Plot ==
The story is about Raavi (Shivya Pathania), whose house in Punjab was a standalone accommodation with separate rooms for each family member, and Vishi (Stavan Shinde) who has a Maharashtrian family that stays in a small room in a Mumbai chawl.

== Cast ==
- Stavan Shinde as Vishi or Vishvambar Dalvi.
- Shivya Pathania as Raavi.
- Ashish Dixit as Abhi or Abhijeet Dalvi.
- Pratiksha Jadhav as Bela.
- Purnima Talwalkar as Anjali Dalvi (Vishi's Mother)
- Rajan Bhise as Avinash Dalvi (Vishi's Father)
- Deepak Chadha as Daljit
- Shadab Nadeem as Baldev
- Prabhjeet Kaur as Pam
