= Bheemili Kabaddi Jattu =

- Poster
- Directed by: Tatineni Satya
- Screenplay by: Tatineni Satya
- Story by: Suseenthiran
- Produced by: N. V. Prasad; Paras Jain
- Starring: Nani; Saranya Mohan
- Cinematography: Chitti Babu.K
- Music by: V. Selvaganesh
- Production company: Megaa Super Good Films
- Release date: 9 July 2010
- Country: India
- Language: Telugu

Bheemili Kabaddi Jattu (transl. Bheemili's Kabaddi team) is a 2010 Telugu-language sports drama film directed by Tatineni Satya (in his directoral debut). starring Nani, and Saranya Mohan along with numerous newcomers. It is a remake of the 2009 Tamil film Vennila Kabadi Kuzhu.

This film marks the directorial debut of Tatineni Satya. The film completed 100 days in Srikakulam town Kinnera complex and Chandramahal theatres and was a hit.

== Story ==
The story unfolds in a remote village near Vizag called Bheemli. What begins as a soft romance between a poor lad Suri (Nani) and a girl (Saranya Mohan) who comes to the village soon takes a turn. Suri, with his childhood friends, yearns to win a Kabaddi tournament. They're known for never managing to win a tournament.

They find themselves by chance in a state-level tournament, expected to be knocked out in the first round. But the bunch of young men who share different thoughts and ideas, with the help of a professional kabaddi coach, emerge as winners. As they proceed, many difficulties are encountered such as Suri having a shoulder dislocation during a match. They win their remaining games and progress to the final. However, during this time, gangsters are searching for Suri.

The final starts off poorly but, after half time, Bheemli Kabaddi Jattu is back in contention. As the game ends in a tie, a player from each team goes up against each other. In the final stages of the head-to-head, Suri wins the game but dies after winning the last point as the opposition player kicks him on the chest as to touch him and win the game. Suri uses his last breath to win the match.

The scene changes to several months later when the girl returns to the place they met searching for Suri. Suri's friend plans to tell her but discards it as he feels that she won't be able to withstand the sad news. Suri's mother is seen crying in her house with Suri's photograph beside her.

== Cast ==
- Nani as Suri
- Saranya Mohan
- Kishore as Prakash
- Dhanraj as Paidithalli
- Vinay as Suri's friend
- Santosh as Suri's friend
- Ramesh as Devudu
- Krishna Chaitanya as Suri's friend
- Chalaki Chanti as Pentiga
- Krishneswara Rao as Suri's lover's father
- Siddhu Jonnalagadda as Dhinesh
- Vithika Sheru as Suri's lover (Uncredited)

== Production ==
The film began shooting in August 2009 and finished in January 2010. The film was shot across Andhra Pradesh and Telangana including Antarvedi, Bheemili, Pochampalli, and Polavaram.

== Soundtrack ==
The music was composed by V. Selvaganesh, who composed for the original, and all songs from the original were reused. The audio rights were sold to Aditya Music. All lyrics were penned by Vanamali.

Bheemili Kabaddi Jattu

Soundtrack album by V. Selvaganesh
- Released: 2010
- Recorded: 2010
- Genre: Soundtrack
- Length: 27:31
- Label: Aditya Music
- Producer: V. Selvaganesh

Track list
No.	Title	Singer(s)	Length
1.	"Pada Pada"	Karthik, Kalpana	4:38
2.	"Kabaddi"	Shankar Mahadevan	5:09
3.	"Neetho"	V.V. Prassanna	4:07
4.	"Naalo Parugulu"	Karthik, Chinmayi	4:48
5.	"Jathara (Nidadholu Pilla)"	Maya, Karthik, Vinay, Anuj Gurwara, Malathy Lakshman	5:45
6.	"Soul of Bheemili (Theme Music)"	Instrumental	3:04
Total length:			27:31

== Reception ==
A critic from Sify wrote that "Bhimili Kabaddi Jattu, on the whole, surely keeps you glued to your seat because the match scenes look real. It?s [sic] a sports film in the true spirit and it is convincingly told. Good attempt, and nice film". A critic from Rediff.com opined that "Bheemili Kabaddi Jattu scores high marks as it's a realistic and touching tale. It's not often one gets to see such films!"
