= Mahima Nambiar =

Indian actress

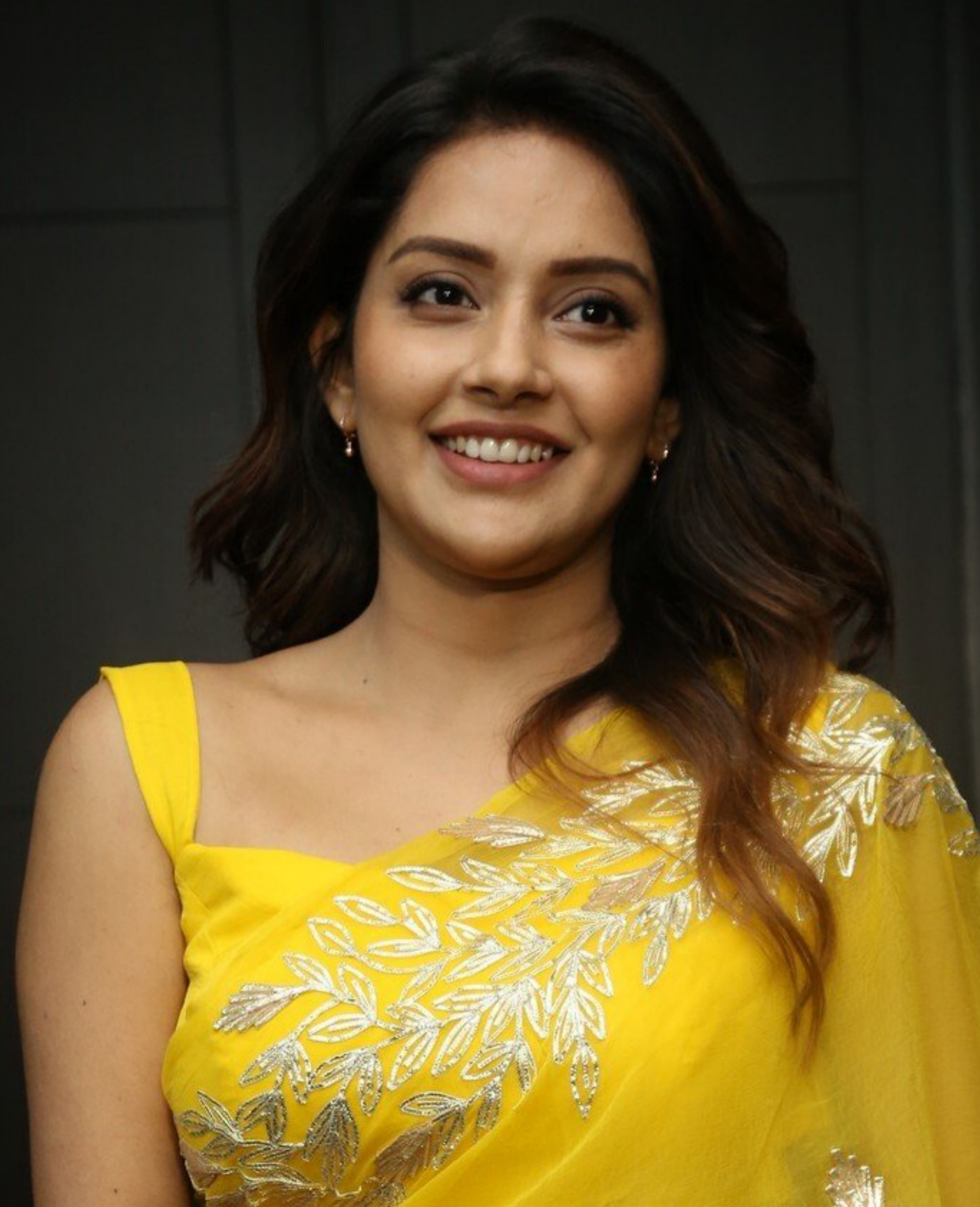
- Mahima in 2024
- Born: Gopika Palat Chirakkaraveettil; 21 December 1994 (age 31); Kasaragod, Kerala, India
- Other name: Mahima
- Occupation: Actress
- Years active: 2010–present

Gopika Palat Chirakkaraveettil (born 21 December 1994) known by her stage name Mahima Nambiar is an Indian actress who predominantly works in Tamil and Malayalam films. She debuted with Kaaryasthan (2010) and went on to receive praise for her performances in Kuttram 23 (2017), Magamuni (2019) also had major commercial success with Madhura Raja (2019), RDX: Robert Dony Xavier (2023), Jai Ganesh (2024), Little Hearts (2024) and Bromance (2025).

== Early life and career ==
Gopika is from Kasaragod, Kerala and did her schooling from TIHSS Naimarmoola. In 2014, she was pursuing a BA in English literature privately. She is a trained classical dancer and a singer.

At age 15, she made her acting debut in the Malayalam film Kaaryasthan, playing Dileep's sister, which she described as a "blink and miss role". She was working as an advertisement model, when the director Samy tried to cast her for Sindhu Samaveli (2010) but she had to decline the offer for personal reasons. The production team later recommended her for Saattai (2012), which was her Tamil film debut. She was in class 12 when she acted in the film, in which she played the lead role of Arivazhagi, a village schoolgirl. After Saattai, she took a year's sabbatical to complete her schooling, and returned to acting with roles in four Tamil films. Her next release was Ennamo Nadakkudhu (2014) in which she appeared as a nurse named Madhu. Later projects include Mosakutty (2014), directed by Jeevan, Puravi 150cc, directed by Cheran's associate Venkat, and Agathinai (2015), directed by Marudhu. She has been signed to play a dual role in Samuthirakani's Kitna.

At the Toronto Tamil International Film Festival 2021, she won the Special Jury Award for Outstanding Performance - Award for Best Supporting Actress for the film Magamuni.

== Filmography ==
Key
†	Denotes films that have not yet been released

Year	Title	Role	Notes	Ref.
2010	Kaaryasthan	Radhika	Malayalam	
2012	Saattai	Arivazhagi "Arivu"	Tamil	
2014	Ennamo Nadakkudhu	Madhu	Tamil	
2014	Mosakutty	Kayalvizhi	Tamil	
2015	Agathinai	Karthika	Tamil	
2017	Kuttram 23	Thendral	Tamil	
2017	Puriyatha Puthir	Mrithula	Tamil	
2017	Kodiveeran	Malar	Tamil	
2017	Masterpiece	Vedhika	Malayalam	
2018	Iravukku Aayiram Kangal	Susheela	Tamil	
2018	Annanukku Jai	Sundari	Tamil	
2019	Madhura Raja	Meenakshi	Malayalam	
2019	Magamuni	Deepa	Tamil	
2020	Asuraguru	Diya	Tamil	
2022	Oh My Dog	Priya	Tamil	
2022	Ayngaran	Anu	Tamil	
2023	Valatty	Saraswati	Malayalam	
2023	RDX: Robert Dony Xavier	Mini	Malayalam	
2023	Chandramukhi 2	Lakshmi	Tamil	
2023	Raththam	Sangeetha / Annapoorni Sebastian	Tamil	
2023	800	Madhimalar, Radhimalar	Tamil	Dual role
2023	Naadu	Shobana	Tamil	
2024	Jai Ganesh	Nidhi	Malayalam	
2024	Little Hearts	Sosha	Malayalam	
2025	Bromance	Dr. Aishwarya	Malayalam	
2026	Mandaadi	Angel Rakkamma	Tamil	
2026	Comrade Kalyan	Sitara Devi	Telugu	

=== YMusic videos ===
Year	Title	Co star	Music	Notes
2021	Gundumalli	Shanthanu Bhagyaraj	Jerald Felix	

== Accolades ==
Year	Award	Category	Film	Result	Ref
2021	Toronto Tamil International Film Festival	Special Jury Award for Outstanding Performance - Best Supporting Actress	Magamuni	Won	
2024	Mazhavil Entertainment Awards	The Entertainer of the Year- Special Mention	RDX: Robert Dony Xavier and Jai Ganesh	Won	
