= Veedevadu =

2017 Indian action thriller film by Tatineni Satya

- Theatrical release poster (Telugu version)
- Directed by: Tatineni Satya
- Screenplay by: Kannan; Tatineni Satya
- Story by: Tatineni Satya
- Produced by: Raina Joshi
- Starring: Sachiin J. Joshi; Esha Gupta
- Cinematography: Binendra Menon
- Edited by: Prawin Pudi
- Music by: S. Thaman
- Production companies: Viiking Media and Entertainment
- Release date: 15 September 2017
- Country: India
- Languages: Telugu; Tamil

Veedevadu (transl. Who is He?) is a 2017 Indian Telugu-language action thriller film written and directed by Tatineni Satya. Also partially re-shot in Tamil as Yaar Ivan (transl. Who is He?), the film stars Sachiin J. Joshi and Esha Gupta, with Prabhu and Kishore in pivotal roles. Featuring music composed by S. Thaman, the venture began production in May 2015.

== Plot ==
The story begins at a boathouse in Goa. Sathya kills his wife Shruthi, and the Goan police later arrests him. In the court, all the witnesses and evidence are against Sathya, but the court sends him to judicial remand for fourteen days and asks the police to submit primary evidence. The Hyderabad commissioner appoints ACP Prakash Varma, an encounter specialist, to deal the case. Prakash is very strict and ruthless in his department, and everyone calls him a psycho. He joins the investigation with his new subordinate Hyder and starts the investigation. First, the duo meets Shruthi's friend Gouthami, a house surgeon and her colleague, who narrates their encounters earlier. Shruthi and Gouthami met Sathya at a 10K run. After some comical circumstances, Shruthi and Sathya fall in love, but Gouthami suspects Sathya and confronts him for his weird behavior. Then, he admits that he wooed Shruthi to get her property. Enraged, Gouthami informs this to her father Jagannath (Jagannathan in Tamil). After having a private talk, to her shock, he accepts their relationship, and Shruthi and Sathya later get married. After knowing the facts, Shruthi avoided Gowthami. Now Gouthami requests the police to encounter Sathya.

After hearing the facts, Prakash later meets Sathya's best friend Srinu (Srinivasan in Tamil). There, he admits that being a topper in MBA and an Andhra Pradesh team state captain in kabaddi, he starts to act weird after his arrest. Srinu reveals that in a state-level kabaddi match, Sathya accidentally kills Peter D'Souza, the captain of the Goa Kabaddi team, and gets arrested by the police. In the investigation, it was ascertained that Peter is an asthma patient, did not reveal his health record, and played the game regardless. That was the main cause of his death, which proved Sathya innocent, and released him. Soon, Srinu got a job in Dubai. Then Sathya, who is in a middle-class status like him, supports financially by explaining everything to him whenever it is necessary and sends him off to Dubai. Later, Srinu tried to reach Sathya several times but no avail. After hearing this news, he came to Goa to meet him. Prakash records all the statements and confirms that they are true. Then, he discovers that Sathya had been transferred to Goa jail for special investigation. There, Sathya receives the deadliest welcome by corrupt jailor Albert D'Souza, who is the elder brother of Peter and swears vengeance on him. Then, he becomes friends with the other inmates and "Selfie" Kishore (Krishna in Tamil), a sub-jailor who has a soft corner on the innocent convicts. Albert tries to kill Sathya to avenge his brother's death, so he forces him to play kabaddi with his prescribed team by bashing his inmates. Then, Sathya accepts and forms a team by giving confidence to his inmates. Finally in the match, Sathya wins the game. Meanwhile, Prakash starts the investigation. In the murder place, he founds a severed hand wearing Shruthi's engagement ring. Then, a forensic report reveals that it was not Shruthi's hand but Sathya's fingerprints found on that hand. Then, in the interrogation room Sathya reveals that the hand was from a woman named Catherine, who was Shruthi's lookalike.

Then the story shifts to before Peter's death in Goa. Srinu and Satya came to Goa to perform in their Kabaddi match finals there the duo meets Catherine and her friend Sony in their first meeting Satya saves Catherine from an accident in Goa Beach from there on they both fall in love but Peter who happened to meet before Satya attracted towards Catherine feels jealous and tries to bash him then Catherine stops the fight then both challenges each other to win the match Catherine is for them.Later in the match Satya accidentally kills Peter for defending himself as a non-striker after Catherine observing the events Catherine misunderstands him that he wantedly killed and leaves him later he didn't met her. After hearing his confession Prakash doubts that Satya didn't killed anyone but Satya admits that he killed and challenges Prakash to prove him on the time.

Later in his home an unknown person tries to kill Prakash and successfully escapes he doubts it was done by Satya alerts Kishore but he found him at the jail, Prakash comes to a lead that the things which is beyond the incidents and concludes that Satya tries to give an information in their conversation regarding about the case. Later in the case analysis he meets Dr.Xavier D'Souza a psychiatrist who observing the case declares that he is suffering from BPD which leads to murder both the girls on fearing of leaving him and suggests him to kill him soon in out of law.

Meanwhile, Albert appoints his loyal convict James to kill Satya which became a failure attempt. After knowing the facts Prakash confronts him then Sathya challenges Prakash to prove him soon. Meanwhile, Jagannath pressures commissioner to kill Sathya out of law. In the prison this time Albert decided to face him off in the kabaddi match Satya successfully bashes all the police team in the final attempt Albert kills Sathya by using morphine in the match meanwhile Prakash receives an MMS video from Sathya reveals the shocking facts regarding of Albert and the mastermind behind the murder of Sruthi later Prakash closed the case.

Later with Hyder Prakash analyses the case facts then he reveals that Satya gave a dying declaration on Albert and Sruthi's father Jagannath who is the mastermind behind all the incidents and reveals that Sruthi is alive. In the interrogation Sathya tells about his encounters with Sruthi actually changed her name into Catherine because to nab Jagannath. Meanwhile, in Mauritius Srinu and Gouthami meets Sruthi and Satya there both reveals the real face of Jagannath. At Goa the accident is wantedly done by unknown assailants later tried her to kill in Hyderabad too. To know who is behind this Sathya and Sruthi starts the game in front of Gouthami wantedly enraged her to inform all the things. When in the private talk with Jagannath he reveals he is behind those attempts on Sruthi and says she is his step daughter he tries to kill her to get her property and reveals that he killed her parents and became her father to the world to get hold of her property.nThen Jagganath offers him 30% of share in the property to kill her then he arranged all the plan later he tries to cheat him by killing with Albert and plans with the commissioner. Later he wantedly get him punished that's why Jaggannath gives severed hand from women dead body wears Sruthi's ring to give a false evidence that's why Sathya needs to tell the story in the name of Catherine. All the facts which has been received by Prakash through the MMS and arrests all of them who involved in the case. Jagannath commits suicide before the arrest. Then Sony, who had joined in the Goa General hospital as a surgeon, declares Sathya is dead to the cops and saves him in the last minute by giving him an antidote.

Finally film ends with Sruthi's property had transferred to a trust and makes Gouthami as the chairman of those trust which helps to poor children for their studies and other facilities and starts a happy life with Sathya.

== Cast ==
- Sachiin J. Joshi as Sathya
- Esha Gupta as Dr. Shruthi/Catherine
- Kishore as ACP Prakash Varma (Prakash in Tamil)
- Prabhu as Jagannath (Jagannathan in Tamil), Sruthi's step father who killed her parents.
- Srinivasa Reddy as Srinu, Satya's friend (Telugu)
- Sathish as Srinivasan, Satya's friend (Tamil)
- Vamsi Krishna as Peter D'Souza, Satya's rival.
- Supreeth as Jailor Albert D'Souza, Peter's brother who is vengeful against Satya.
- Vennela Kishore as "Selfie" Kishore, a sub-jailor subordinate to Albert, who has soft corner on the convicts.
- Delhi Ganesh as Panthulu (Perusu in Tamil), a prisoner who befriends Sathya.
- Harsha Vardhan as Sub-Inspector Hyder, Prakash's subordinate.
- Dhanya Balakrishna as Dr. Gouthami Ramakrishna, Sruthi's best friend who dislikes Satya.
- Pratap Pothan as Dr. Xavier D'Souza
- Shatru as James, a loyal convict to Albert.
- Khayyum as Ghichmi
- Banerjee as Commissioner who Appoints Prakash Varma
- Kiran as Dr. Sony, Sruthi's best friend.
- Raghuvaran as Raghunath, Shruthi's father (in portrait)
- Soundarya as Lakshmi, Shruthi's mother (in portrait)

== Production ==
The film was first reported in May 2015, when it was reported that Telugu director Tatineni Satya would make a bilingual Telugu and Tamil film with Sachiin J. Joshi and Esha Gupta in the lead roles, revolving around a kabaddi player who is sentenced to jail after being accused of murdering his girlfriend. Despite the announcement, the film only began a year later in May 2016, with the team shooting a song in Poland soon after. Titled Veedevadu in Telug and Yaar Ivan in Tamil, production was completed in December 2016.

Prior to the release of the film's first look in Tamil, the team kept the identity of the lead actor a secret and endorsed a competition where the public could attempt to guess the lead star to win a trip to Goa.

== Soundtrack ==
The soundtrack was composed by S. Thaman.

Veedevadu / Yaar Ivan

Soundtrack album by S. Thaman
- Released: 2017
- Genre: Feature film soundtrack
- Length: 19:07
- Language: Tamil
- Labels: Lahari Music, T-Series

S. Thaman chronology
Ivan Thanthiran (2017)	Veedevadu / Yaar Ivan (2017)	Goutham Nanda (2017)

Telugu Tracklist
No.	Title	Singer(s)	Length
1.	"Ela Ela"	M. M. Manasi	4:26
2.	"Ninne Nenu Premisthunna"	M. M. Manasi	3:43
3.	"Ka Ka Ka Kaakulu"	Deepak, MC Vickey	3:12
4.	"Saregama"	Geetha Madhuri, M. M. Manasi	3:57
5.	"Susheela"	Sameera Bharadwaj	3:50
Total length:			19:08

Tamil Tracklist
No.	Title	Singer(s)	Length
1.	"Sare Gama"	M. M. Monisha	3.57
2.	"Susheela"	M. M. Monisha	3.50
3.	"Hei Mr Thappu"	Deepak, MC Vickey	3.11
4.	"Uyire Uyire"	Sharmila	3.43
5.	"Yeno Yeno"	Deepak	4.26
Total length:			19:07

== Critical reception ==
Telangana Today wrote that "Overall, ‘Veedevadu’ is a watch-worthy thriller". New Indian Express wrote that "Veedevadu is a film that could’ve been much better if it wasn’t for all the unnecessary and counterproductive padding". A critic from The Times of India wrote "There is the potential for a good masala noir in the premise of Yaar Ivan, but the film wants to be much more. [..] But the problem is that these elements aren’t brought together into a wholly satisfying narrative."
