= Nirnayam (2013 film) =

- Release poster
- Directed by: S. S. Srisaravanan
- Produced by: V. Selvaganesh
- Starring: Vikram Anand; Regina Cassandra; Baby Vedhika
- Cinematography: Chitti Babu.K
- Edited by: Sathish Suriya
- Music by: V. Selvaganesh
- Release date: 18 October 2013
- Country: India
- Language: Tamil

Nirnayam is a 2013 Indian Tamil drama film written and directed by Srisaravanan and produced by music composer V. Selvaganesh. The film features Vikram Anand, Regina Cassandra and Baby Vedhika in the lead roles, with Saranya and Harris Moosa playing other pivotal characters. The film opened to mixed reviews upon release on 18 October 2013.

== Cast ==
- Raana Vikram as Mukundan
- Regina Cassandra as Jeni
- Baby Vedhika as Meera
- Saranya as Simran
- Harris Moosa
- VK Raghunath

== Production ==
The film was initially titled as Thaedel and was announced as a joint production venture of music composer V. Selvaganesh, director Saravanan and Cinematographer Chitti Babu.K in June 2012.

== Soundtrack ==
The audio of Nirnayam was held at Satyam Cinemas in Chennai on 14 February 2013 with the soundtrack being released by Vikku Vinayakram and received by director K. S. Ravikumar.

== Release ==
The film opened to mixed reviews from critics. A critic from The Times of India noted "The plot also goes haywire towards the end when Mukund's secret is discovered, and the climax is logically shaky." The New Indian Express noted "It was a knot with potential. But if only it had more consistency in its feel, and was crisper in its narration."
