= People for Cattle in India =

- Abbreviation: PFCI
- Formation: 22 October 2012
- Founder: G. Arun Prasanna
- Type: Non-governmental organisation
- Purpose: Focusing on illegal cattle trafficking and slaughtering

People for Cattle in India (PFCI) is a non-governmental organisation and nonprofit organisation focusing on illegal cattle trafficking and slaughtering. PFCI has saved more than 1000 cattle lives in India.

PFCI has been closely working with various government, NGOs (non-government organisations), SHGs (self help groups) and CBOs (community-based organisations). The organisation was founded on 22 October 2012 by G. Arun Prasanna, an animal activist.

The organisation states its mission statement thus:

To promote Animal Welfare and prevent Animal Cruelty, especially focusing on but not limited to cattle and work towards creating a social climate where animals live peacefully without exploitation and cruelty by humans and work with the ultimate aim of establishing an aware, responsible and developed society based upon mutual harmony and justice between man and animal, ensuring sustainable and holistic development with emphasis on animal rights, and a culture of social growth through creating synergy and building strategic partnership with the Government, NGOs (non-government organisations), SHGs (self help groups), CBOs (community-based organisations) and various national and international organisations by planning appropriate downstream and upstream interventions.

== See also ==
- Animal rescue group
