= Thagubothu Ramesh =

Indian actor and comedian

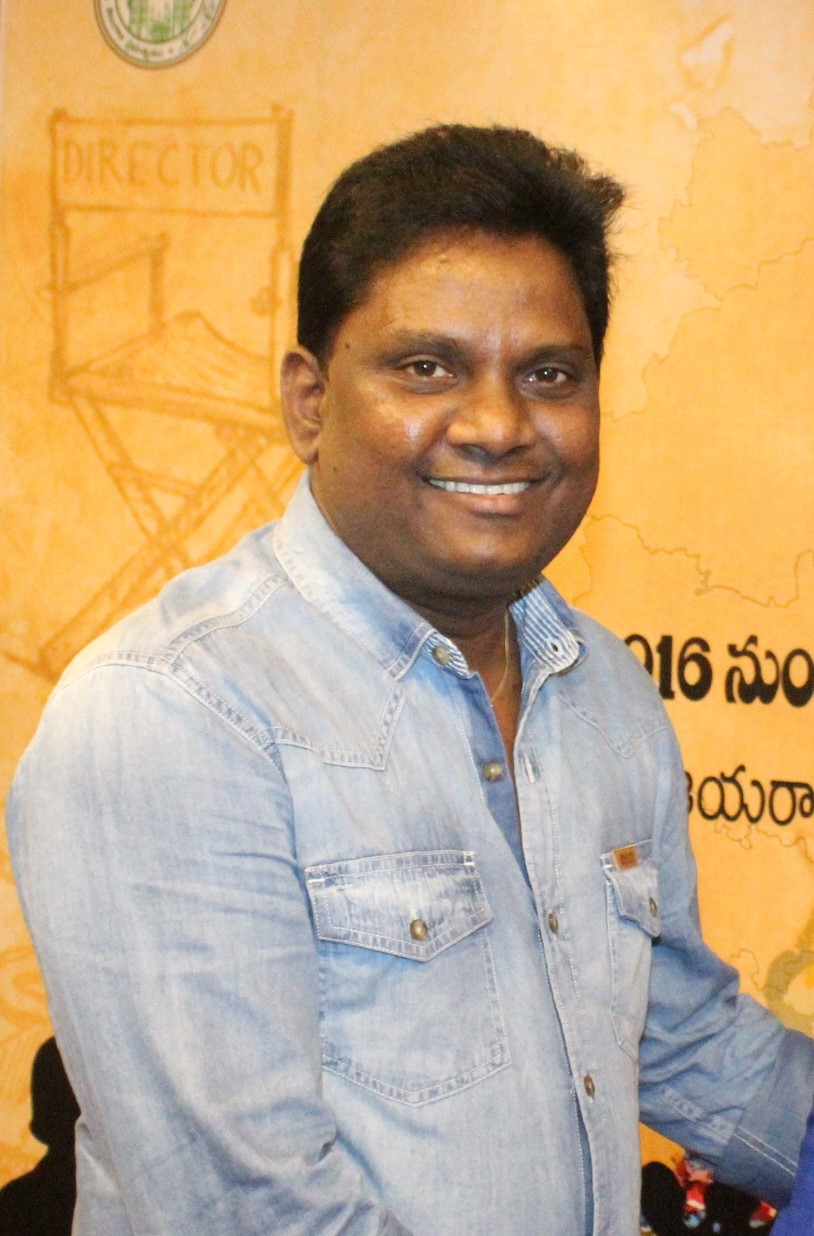
- Ramesh in 2015
- Born: Ramilla Ramesh; Godavarikhani, Telangana, India
- Occupations: Actor, comedian
- Years active: 2007–present
- Spouse: Swathi (m. 2015)

Ramilla Ramesh, better known as Thagubothu Ramesh, is an Indian actor and comedian known for his work in Telugu cinema. Known for his signature portrayal of inebriated characters, he earned the nickname "Thagubothu" (transl. "drunkard") due to his memorable performances in such roles. He is a recipient of Nandi Award for Best Male Comedian. He has appeared in notable films such as Mahatma (2009), Ala Modalaindi (2011), Pilla Zamindar (2011), and Ishq (2012).

== Early life ==
Ramesh was born in Godavarikhani located in Peddapalli district, Telangana. His father was an employee at Singareni Collieries Company and his mother was a housewife. He was able to sink into the drunkard character because, as a child he would watch his father get drunk and hit his mother. He would pacify his mother, and make her laugh by impersonating his drunk father.

== Career ==
Ramesh eventually became good at mimicry and used to perform shows in his town. He also reveals that he is inspired by Bengali comedian Keshto Mukherjee, who like him was also famous for portraying drunkard characters. Before venturing into films, Ramesh has worked as a building supervisor for 10 years. After his parents' death and sister's marriage, he decided to pursue acting as a career. In 2005, he joined the Akkineni Film Institute in Hyderabad.

=== Film career ===
In 2006, after graduating from Akkineni Film Institute, Ramesh got an opportunity to play a small role in Sukumar’s Jagadam. This was his first feature film. After Jagadam, Ramesh found several opportunities and acted in around 10 Telugu films. During this time, Ramesh got acquainted with popular Telugu actor Uttej. Uttej introduced Ramesh to top Telugu film director Krishna Vamsi. Vamsi cast him for the role of a drunkard in Mahatma. The film remains as a major turning point in his career. His portrayal of drunkard character in Mahatma led to an opportunity to play a similar drunkard character in Ala Modalaindi directed by Nandini Reddy. His portrayal of Gowtham, a drunkard software engineer in the film became very popular among the moviegoers. Since that film, he was more commonly referred to as "Thagubothu Ramesh" (drunkard Ramesh).

== Personal life ==
He married Swathi in 2015.

== Awards ==
- Nandi Award for Best Male Comedian for Venkatadri Express - 2013

== Filmography ==
=== Telugu films ===
Year	Title	Role	Notes
2007	Jagadam	Seenu's friend	credited as Ramesh
2009	Mahatma	Drunkard	credited as Ramesh
2009	Ee Vayasulo	Chhote Kiya	
2010	Bheemli Kabadi Jattu	Suri's friend	
2011	Ala Modalaindi	Gautham (drunkard software engineer)	
2011	Katha Screenplay Darshakatvam Appalaraju	Fan	
2011	Kodi Punju		
2011	Aha Naa Pellanta	Fan	
2011	Mugguru		
2011	100% Love	Drunkard	Special appearance
2011	It's My Love Story	Poola Babji	
2011	Pilla Zamindar	Maqbool	
2011	Madatha Kaja		
2011	Priyudu		
2012	SMS		
2012	Chaduvukovali		
2012	Ishq	Friend	
2012	Mem Vayasuku Vacham	Beggar	
2012	Eega	Thief	
2012	Vennela 1½		
2012	Routine Love Story	College Senior	
2012	Yamaho Yama		
2012	Ko Antey Koti		
2013	Baadshah	Wedding Planner	
2013	Vasool Raja		
2013	Gunde Jaari Gallanthayyinde	Thagubothu	
2013	Sukumarudu	Drama troupe member	
2013	Adda		
2013	Dalam	Yadagiri "Yadav"	Bilingual film
2013	Balupu		
2013	Athadu Aame O Scooter	Govind Raju's best friend	
2013	Music Magic		
2013	Chandi	Driver	
2013	Venkatadri Express	Auto driver Aanimuthyam "Ani"	Nandi Award for Best Comedian
2013	Biskett		
2014	Emo Gurram Egaravachu	Ammiraju	
2014	Anaamika	Taxi driver	
2014	Jump Jilani		
2014	Adavi Kaachina Vennela		
2014	Race Gurram	Lucky's friend	
2014	Saheba Subramanyam		
2014	Chakkiligintha	Manohar	
2015	Surya vs Surya	Icecream vendor	
2015	Dohchay	Drunk Prisoner	
2015	Subramanyam for Sale	Dasu	
2015	Where Is Vidya Balan		
2015	Superstar Kidnap		
2015	Sher	Drunkard	
2015	Kumari 21F		
2016	Nannaku Prematho	Abhiram's assistant	
2016	Kalyana Vaibhogame	Gowtham (Software Engineer)	
2016	Oopiri	Seenu's friend	Bilingual film
2016	Bullet Rani		Simultaneously shot in Kannada
2016	Parvathipuram	Madan's friend	Dubbed in 2023 as Veera Khadgam
2016	Eedo Rakam Aado Rakam	Rikshawala	
2016	Thikka	Ramesh Yadav	
2016	Guntur Talkies	Police constable	
2016	Selfie Raja	drunk Kattappa	
2016	Jayammu Nischayammu Raa	Police constable	
2017	Nenorakam		
2017	Rarandoi Veduka Chudham	Govind	
2017	Anando Brahma	Thulasi	
2017	Ungarala Rambabu		
2017	Raja The Great	Sastry	Cameo
2017	Oye Ninne	Drunkard	
2017	Juliet Lover of Idiot		
2018	Hyderabad Love Story		
2018	Savyasachi	Nanda Kishore	
2019	Chikati Gadilo Chithakotudu	Rose	
2019	Mallesham		
2019	90ML	Ramesh	
2019	Bhagyanagara Veedullo Gamattu	—N/a	Co-producer
2020	Namaste Nestama		
2020	Jaanu	Satish	
2022	Malli Modalaindi		
2022	Induvadana		
2022	10th Class Diaries		
2022	Anukoni Prayanam		
2022	Raajahyogam	Trump	
2023	Prathyardhi	Advocate Rajasekhar	
2023	Meter	Drunkard	
2023	Ramanna Youth		
2023	Nene Naa		
2024	Chaari 111	Bunty	
2024	Kismat		
2024	Tiragabadara Saami		
2024	Keshava Chandra Ramavath		
2025	Coffee with a Killer		
2025	23 Iravai Moodu		
2025	Santhana Prapthirasthu	Soumya Kumar	
2026	Sahakutumbaanaam	Sharing guy	
2026	Sampradayini Suppini Suddapoosani		
2026	Sathi Leelavathi		
2026	Mareechika		

=== Other language films ===
Year	Title	Role	Language	Notes
2014	Yennamo Yedho	Gautham	Tamil	Credited as Kudikaran Ramesh
2014	Koottam	Prabhu Deva	Tamil	Bilingual films
2014	Nee Enge En Anbe	Taxi driver	Tamil	Bilingual films
2016	Thozha	Seenu's friend	Tamil	Bilingual films
2016	Bullet Rani		Kannada	Bilingual film

=== Television ===
Year	Title	Role	Network	Notes
2018	Gangstars	Rani	Amazon Prime Video	
2020–2021	Amrutham Dhvitheeyam		ZEE5	
2022	Gaalivana	Anjaneyulu	ZEE5	
