= Routine Love Story =

2012 film by Praveen Sattaru

- Poster
- Directed by: Praveen Sattaru
- Written by: Praveen Sattaru
- Produced by: Chanakya Booneti
- Starring: Sundeep Kishan; Regina Cassandra
- Cinematography: Suresh Bhargav
- Edited by: Dharmendra Kakarala
- Music by: Mickey J. Meyer
- Release date: 23 November 2012
- Country: India
- Language: Telugu
- Budget: ₹2.5 crore (US$260,000)
- Box office: ₹12.5 crore (US$1.3 million)

Routine Love Story is a 2012 Telugu-language romantic comedy film starring Sundeep Kishan and Regina Cassandra. The movie is directed by Praveen Sattaru, who earlier made LBW (Life Before Wedding) and produced by Chanakya Booneti. Soundtrack of the film was composed by Mickey J Meyer. The film was Released on 23 November 2012 along with Nagarjuna's Dhamarukam and both the films got a good start at the box office in Andhra Pradesh, Telangana and other parts of the world.

== Cast ==
- Sundeep Kishan as Sanju
- Regina Cassandra as Tanvi
- MS Narayana
- Vennela Kishore
- Hema
- Chandra Mohan
- Sanjay Reddy as Husband and Lord Krishna
- Kavitha
- Master Nikhil
- Jhansi Laxmi
- Thagubothu Ramesh as Ramesh
- Narasimha
- RJ Hemanth
- RJ Bharat
- Snigdha as Neetu
- Naveen Neni as Tulasi
- Swapnika

== Soundtrack ==
Routine Love Story

Soundtrack album by Mickey J Meyer
- Released: 15–20 October 2012
- Recorded: 2012
- Genre: Feature film soundtrack
- Length: 24:28
- Language: Telugu
- Label: Aditya Music
- Producer: Mickey J Meyer

Mickey J Meyer chronology
Life Is Beautiful (2012)	Routine Love Story (2012)	Seethamma Vakitlo Sirimalle Chettu (2012)

The audio of the film was launched in a very different way. On 15 October 2012 the song 1 was released in Radio Mirchi with Mickey J Meyer between 6:00pm and 7:00pm. On 16 October 2012 the song 2 was released in TV9 during evening news bulletin with Laxmi Manchu between 6:00pm and 7:00pm. On 17 October 2012 the song 3 was released in MAA Music "something special" Show with Manoj Manchu between 8:30am and 10:00am. On 18 October 2012 the song 4 was released in idlebrain.com. On 20 October 2012 the song 5 was released with conventional audio launch function whose live coverage was done by TV9 and MAA TV.

Tracklist
No.	Title	Lyrics	Singer(s)	Length
1.	"Naa Manasupai"	Ananta Sriram	Sreeramachandra	4:16
2.	"Neethone Unna"	Vanamali	Mickey J Meyer	4:41
3.	"Vela Talukutaarale"	Chinni Krishna	Karthik	4:43
4.	"Yeppatikaina"	Ananta Sriram	Naresh Iyer	4:42
5.	"Nee Varasa Neede"	Ananta Sriram	Karthik	4:38
6.	"Routine Love Story Theme"		Deepu	1:28
Total length:				24:28

== Reception ==
The movie received positive reviews. 123telugu.com gave a review stating "Routine Love Story is a film which has its share of highs and lows. Fresh feel, good chemistry between the lead pair and some nice conversations are plus points. On the flip side, unnecessary and bad comedy tracks and irrelevant characters spoil the experience. Overall, RLS is a decent entertainer that will appeal to youngsters as a one time watch." idlebrain.com gave a review stating "Routine Love Story departs from the routine love stories of Telugu cinema and tries to be different. The urbane youth humor makes sure that a subject of this nature is received with open arms. Praveen Sattaru who has shown sparks with his directorial debut LBW upped the ante now to reach for more audiences with a subject that appeals to both youth and urban families. You may watch Routine Love Story for humor and for an insight into relationships in changing times." Oneindia Entertainment gave a review stating "Although, it is titled Routine Love Story, it has a fresh and brand new story, which has some realistic moments, which young audience can relate to their life. It is a must watch for youth." apherald.com gave a review stating "A routine love story is presented in a youthful entertaining way , worth watching this weekend." IndiaGlitz gave a review stating "All in all, RLS makes a beautiful movie watching experience for laic as well as discerning audiences." Rediff.com gave a review stating "The film scores on account of the realism and logic despite being a commercial entertainer. The arguments and patch-ups are like everyday life but don't bore the audience. The bonding, separation, attitudes and differences between the couple are hugely believable and relatable in today's age. In that sense, the film moves in a lifelike way and not in a dream world. RLS may find favour with the urban audience, especially the youth, who may connect to it instantly."
