= List of Disney TV programming blocks =

Disney standalone programming TV blocks are blocks of Disney shows on non-Disney channels or TV stations around the world for audiences that do not have access to cable or satellite.

By the end of March 2000, Disney was in 35 countries in three regions, Latin America, Europe and Asia-Pacific (13 countries) with 82 blocks with more than 9,000 hours of total programming per year. These blocks had various names, including: Disney Club, Disney's FilmParade, Disneytime, Disney!, DisneyKid, Club Disney, Saturday Disney, Disney Adventures, Disney Animation Hour, Disney Fun Time, Good Morning Disney, Disney Hour, Disney Sandhya, Disney Toontown, Sunday Club Disney, I Love Disney, Disney Animation Time, and Dragon Club (China). A large number of these blocks served as international equivalents to The Disney Afternoon and Disney's One Saturday Morning.

Disney also had a series of channels and blocks called Jetix, originally called Fox Kids, acquired in the purchase of Fox Family Worldwide, now ABC Family Worldwide.

== List of blocks ==
Market	block	channel/network	type	length (hrs)	premiered	closed
=== A–B ===
Argentina	Playhouse Disney	an Artear channel			2007	
Australia	Total Girl	7Two	weekday mornings	2.5	March 5, 2012 †	
Australia	K-Zone	7mate	weekday mornings	2.5	March 5, 2012 †	
Australia	Saturday Disney	Seven Network/7flix	Saturday	3	January 27, 1990	September 24, 2016
Australia	Playhouse Disney	Seven Network	weekly	.5	2003	2008
Brazil	Disney on TV (Disney en TV)	TV Globo			2004	August 2015
Brazil	Disney World (Mundo Disney)	SBT	daily	2	September 1, 2015	August 31, 2018
Brazil	Disney Movies (Cine Disney)	SBT			1980s	
Brazil	Success Screen (Tela de Sucessos)	SBT			1997	2004
=== C–D ===
Canada	The Disney Afternoon (DA)	CITV-DT	weekday	2/day	August 9, 1991	
Czech Republic	Disney Club	TV Nova	weekly	2	2006	
China	Disney Adventures	provincial broadcasters, free-to-air and cable				
China	Disney Club	12 stations (8/1997)			1995	before 2008
China	Dragon Club ‡	80% of cable providers	daily	2/day	September 19, 1994	January 1, 2019
China	Panda Club ‡	four of China's five regional broadcasters	3 blocks	2/block	October 3, 1994	1999
Denmark	Disney Sjov	DR 1	weekly on Fridays	1	25 October 1991 - 31 December 2022	
=== G–H ===
Germany	unnamed (or unrevealed name)	Kirch Media's ProSieben	Sunday afternoon movie		2002	
Germany	Disney Club	RTL	Saturday and Sunday			2002
Germany	Disney Club	ProSieben	Saturday		2002	
Germany	Disney Filmparade	RTL	movie		2000	2005
Germany	Disney Filmparade	ProSiebenSat.1 Group channel	movie		2005	
Germany	Disney Time	RTL			-2000-	
Germany	Disney Time	ProSieben	Sunday	2		late December 2004
Germany	Disney Time	Kabel 1	Sunday	3	late December 2004	
Hungary	Walt Disney Bemutatja	M1	Sunday Afternoon		1991	1998
Hungary	Disney Klub	RTL Klub	Saturday morning	1	January 2003	
=== I–K ===
India	Disney Time	Star Plus		1	-2005-	
India	unnamed or unmentioned	DD National			-1994-	
India	unnamed or unmentioned	Zee TV's Alpha language channels, Marathi, Punjabi, Gujarati and Bengali			November 1, 2000	2001 contract was up ↑
India	Disney Fun Time	DD Metro			2000	2001
India	Disney Jadoo	DD National (purchased time)	Saturday 10am	.5	2005	
India	Good Morning Disney	Zee TV	morning	2		2000
India	Good Morning Disney	Sony TV	morning	2	2000	2002
India	Disney Hour	Zee TV	afternoon	2		2000
India	Disney Hour	Sony TV	afternoon	2	2000	2002
India	unmentioned	STAR Utsav			-2005-	
India	Disney Sandhya	Eenadu TV	daily Telugu dubbed		1999	
Italy	Disney Club	Rai 1 (1991–1993, 1994–2000) Rai 2 (2000–2006)	weekend		1991	2006
Italy	A tutto Disney	Canale 5	Saturday Afternoons		October 2, 1993	June 18, 1994
Italy	Disney Cinemagic	Sky Cinema Family	weekend movies		2011	2019
Japan	Disney Time	Dlife			December 2013	March 31, 2020
Kazakhstan	Disney Club	KTK	weekly		2006 (renewed) - 2014	
=== M–P ===
Mexico	Disney Club	Azteca 7			1998	2001
Mexico	Disney Club	Azteca 7	new format		2001	2016
New Zealand	Disney Club	TVNZ			October 2002	
Philippines	Disney Club	TV5			November 2010	
Poland	Walt Disney Przedstawia	TVP1	weekend		January 5, 1991	January 1, 2005
Portugal	Clube Amigos Disney	RTP1	Sunday Afternoons		February 23, 1986	July 2, 1989
Portugal	Clube Disney	Canal 1/RTP1 RTP2	weekend		1991	2001
Portugal	Disney Kids	SIC	weekend mornings		2001	August 30, 2015
=== R–T ===
Romania	Disney Club	RTV				
Spain	Club Disney	TVE 1/La 1 (1990–1998) Telecinco (1998–2002)	weekend		1990	2002
Spain	Zona Disney	Telecinco (2002–2003) TVE 1/La 1 (2003–2007)	weekend		2002	2007
Thailand	Disney Club	BBTV	Saturday	1		2002
Thailand	Disney Club	BBTV	Saturday	1.5	2002	2006
Thailand	Disney Club	BBTV	Saturday	100-minute	2006	2018
Thailand	Disney Club	BBTV	weekend	35-minute	2018	
=== U–V ===
UAE	Disney Club	Dubai TV	daily	.5; Thu. & Fri. 1	2006	
United Kingdom	Diggin’ It ↔	GMTV				February 2005
United Kingdom	Playhouse Disney	ABC1	weekday mornings	1.5	2006 Summer	September 26, 2007
United Kingdom	Saturday Disney	GMTV			July 2, 1993	
USA	ABC Kids (formerly Disney's One Saturday Morning)	ABC	Saturday morning	2	September 13, 1997	August 27, 2011
USA	The Disney Afternoon (DA)	syndication	weekday afternoons	2/day	September 10, 1990	August 31, 1997
USA	Disney's Come On!	CBS	weekday afternoons	1.5/day	September 1, 1997	August 1999
USA	Disney's One Too (formerly DKA)	UPN & syndication	Sunday mornings & weekdays	2/day	September 6, 1999	August 31, 2003
USA	That's So Throwback	Freeform	Monday-Thursday late night	2	May 2, 2016	
USA	Treasures from the Disney Vault	TCM	quarterly classics	~9	December 21, 2014	
Vietnam	Toon Disney	HCMC TV			February 2007	

=== Notes ===
† Seven launched two weekday blocks (from 6:30am–9:00am) with mostly Disney programming on March 5, 2012, named after and aligned with affiliated Pacific Magazines's two tween magazines:

† Total Girl: is a girl focused block on 7Two with launch programs of Hannah Montana, Wizards of Waverly Place, Jonas LA, Sonny with a Chance, Good Luck Charlie, Shake It Up and The Fairies.
† K-Zone is a boy aimed block on 7mate with launch programs of Handy Manny, Stitch!, Kick Buttowski, Phineas and Ferb, Pair of Kings, Zeke and Luther and I'm in the Band.

‡ These two Chinese clubs found by ABC and DIC Entertainment before Disney's purchase of CC/ABC.
↔ This block had a companion website, www.diggit.co.uk, created in 2000 that allowed for personalization and creation of a "Dink", a custom virtual character.
↑ under a one-year revenue-sharing agreement with Zee marketing the block and guaranteeing a minimum revenue to Disney.
