= Magamuni =

Tamil-language crime thriller film directed by Santhakumar

- Theatrical release poster
- Directed by: Santhakumar
- Written by: Santhakumar
- Produced by: K. E. Gnanavel Raja
- Starring: Arya; Indhuja Ravichandran; Mahima Nambiar
- Cinematography: Arun Bathmanaban
- Edited by: V. J. Sabu Joseph
- Music by: S. Thaman
- Production company: Studio Green
- Distributed by: Tarun Pictures
- Release date: 6 September 2019
- Running time: 156 minutes
- Country: India
- Language: Tamil

Magamuni (transl. The Great Sage) is a 2019 Indian Tamil-language action thriller film written and directed by Santhakumar. The film stars Arya in dual roles along with Indhuja Ravichandran and Mahima Nambiar. Kaali Venkat, Rohini, Jayaprakash, and Ilavarasu play supporting roles. S. Thaman scores music for the film, and editing is handled by V. J. Sabu Joseph with cinematography handled by Arun Bathmanaban. Principal photography for the film commenced in November 2018. It was theatrically released by Tarun Pictures on 6 September 2019 to highly positive reviews from both critics and the audience. The film has won several international awards from various film festivals across the world.

== Plot ==
The film travels back and forth between two characters. Magadevan is a taxi driver in Chennai who also works as a thug for a corrupt politician named Muthurajan. Muniraj is a Good Samaritan and organic farmer who believes in Swami Vivekananda's teachings, thinks the world of Tamil literature, and lives in a village near Erode. Maga is an atheist, while Muni practices yoga and spreads the word of Hinduism.

Maga thinks the world of his wife, Viji, and his five-year-old son, Prabha. He is also trying to turn a new leaf and leave the world of crime. Muni, on the other hand, is happy living with his loving mother. He wants to be a "Nitya Brahmachari" (bachelor) and at the same time, impart knowledge to students. Deepa is a journalism student and the daughter of a local landlord named Jayaraman, who is in awe of the soft-spoken Muni. Trouble erupts for Maga when one of Muthuraj's rivals, Guru Narayanan, tries to frame him in an earlier murder case, which he planned for Muthuraj. Muthuraj, to save himself and his nephew, connives with the police and makes Maga the bad guy. At the same time, Jayaraman does not like his daughter moving around with Muni, a lower-caste man, and wants to eliminate him.

Jayaraman plans to kill Muni via a snakebite from a king cobra on his farm; however, Deepa saves and admits Muni to the hospital. Meanwhile, Maga is framed for the murder of Guru Narayanan's brother, Surya Narayanan, and is wanted by the police. Maga plans to escape to Vizag with his family and lead a normal life. He requests that Muthuraj pay him the balance so he can start a new life. However, he does not know that Muthuraj has betrayed him by disclosing his whereabouts to the police and Guru Narayanan. While Maga is on the way to meet Muthuraj, the police chase and shoot him. Maga, despite being severely wounded, escapes the place by boarding a goods train.

Policemen track Maga's location using his mobile phone signal and find that he is somewhere near Erode. Maga contacts Muthuraj again, requesting help. Muthuraj asks Maga to meet Jayaraman (who is also his friend) in Erode to get some money. In the meantime, policemen search all the hospitals around Erode, suspecting Maga to be treated for his injury. Finally, the police find Muni in a hospital (as he was admitted for his snakebite) and arrest him, mistaking him for Maga. Meanwhile, Maga goes to Jayaraman's house seeking help. There, a drunk Jayaraman is shocked to see Maga and mistakes him for Muni, who has come to avenge him. Jayaraman tries to attack Maga, but Maga kills Jayaraman to safeguard himself.

Maga's friends find out Muthuraj's true identity and inform Maga. Maga feels bad for being betrayed by Muthuraj. On the other hand, a corrupt police inspector, Devaraj, hands Muni over to Guru Narayanan. Guru Narayanan's henchmen attack Muni in revenge, believing him to be Maga. Muni is critically injured and admitted to the hospital. The police also arrested Viji and her son. Viji thinks that Maga is dead and commits suicide by jumping into a well. Maga learns about Muni from his friends, and he rushes to see him in the hospital. Maga understands that Muni is his twin brother. A small flashback is shown where Maga and Muni's mother, Deivanai, was mentally ill, and she left the two children alone on an empty train platform and went away. Maga and Muni were separated when they were kids. Maga grew up in an orphanage, while a widow adopted Muni.

Maga gets furious knowing about Viji's death and decides to kill the baddies. He goes to Muthuraj's place and kills everyone, including Muthuraj (he killed him with a shotgun), Guru Narayanan (he stabs him with two knives), and Devaraj (he pushes Devaraj down a well and throws a Molotov at him). As Maga was also shot by police before, he was also admitted to the same hospital where Muni is. Unfortunately, Muni passed away. After a few months, it is shown that Maga comes to Muni's village, feeling guilty about Muni's death, and decides to follow Muni's path of literature and peace of mind. Prabha is rescued by Deepa and raised by Deivanai. In the end, when Maga is asked by a man what his name is, he says, "Magamuni."

== Cast ==
- Arya in a dual role as Magadevan and Muniraj
- Indhuja Ravichandran as Viji
- Mahima Nambiar as Deepa
- Kaali Venkat as Dr. Raghu
- Rohini as Deivanai, Muni's mother
- Jayaprakash as Jayaraman
- Ilavarasu as Muthurajan
- Aruldoss as Guru Narayanan
- Bala Singh as KMK District President
- G. M. Sundar as Inspector Devaraj
- Krishnamurthy as Surya Narayanan
- Madhan Kumar as Aadhi Narayanan
- Jashik as Prabha, Maga's son
- Deepa Shankar as Gomathy, Muthuraj's wife
- KPY Yogi as Gopal, Muthuraj's assistant
- Supergood Subramani as Therumunai Thirumurthy
- Sembaruthi Sanjay as Deepa's brother
- Seshu as Travels Manager
- Sivaraj as Inspector
- Thangamani Prabhu as Guru Dhanapal
- Nakkalites Chella as Farmhouse Servant
- Rishikanth as Gothandapani's friend

== Production ==
The film was announced by Santhakumar, who is known for his critically acclaimed Mouna Guru, which was released in 2011. The filming commenced on 14 November 2018, marking the director's second film in his career. The shooting held at a brisk pace and predominantly shot in Chennai, Kancheepuram and Erode. Filmmakers roped in actor Arya to play the male lead who was signed to portray dual roles, one an assassin and another a farmer and vallalar follower.

== Release ==
=== Theatrical ===
The film was theatrically released by Tarun Pictures on 6 September 2019.

== Box office ==
In the opening weekend, Magamuni collected ₹1 crore (US$100,000) at the Chennai box office.

== Soundtrack ==
The soundtrack of the film is composed by S. S. Thaman, continuing his collaboration with the director after Mouna Guru. The lyrics written by Kavignar Muthulingam and Krishnamoorthy Dhanushkodi.

Magamuni

Soundtrack album by S. S. Thaman
- Released: 2019
- Genre: Soundtrack
- Length: 12:46
- Language: Tamil
- Label: Divo
- Producer: S. S. Thaman

S. S. Thaman chronology
Voter (2019)	Magamuni (2019)	Venky Mama (2019)

No.	Title	Lyrics	Length
1.	"Odum Neeril Odam Pola"	Kavingnar Muthulingam	4:16
2.	"Kazhaga Kodi Parakkuthadaa"	Krishnamoorthy Dhanushkodi	5:14
3.	"Eppadi Eppadi"	Kavingnar Muthulingam	3:16

== Reception ==
M Suganth of Times of india rated 3.5 out of 5 and stated that "Director Santhakumar intercuts these scenes of Maga with scenes featuring Muniraj (Arya), an astute lower caste person living with his mother in a village in Erode district. Muni is facing an equally life-threatening problem, thanks to Deepa (Mahima Nambiar), the forward thinking daughter of Jayaraman (Jayaprakash), a big shot in the village."

Janani K of India Today wrote that "Director Santhkumar's second film Magamuni is an excellent social commentary on casteism, discrimination, politics and spirituality. The film starring Arya is a slow burner, but will pry open your eyes." and gave 3.5 /5 stars.

== Award ==
Toronto Tamil International Film Festival 2021

- Special Jury Award for Outstanding Performance - Award for Best Supporting Actress - Mahima Nambiar.

9th South Indian International Movie Awards

- Best Supporting Actress - Tamil - Indhuja Ravichandran
