= Mouna Guru =

- Theatrical release poster
- Directed by: Santhakumar
- Written by: Santhakumar
- Produced by: M. K. Thamizharasu
- Starring: Arulnidhi; Ineya
- Cinematography: Mahesh Muthuswami
- Edited by: Raja Mohammad
- Music by: S. Thaman
- Production company: Mohana Movies
- Release date: 16 December 2011
- Running time: 153 minutes
- Country: India
- Language: Tamil

Mouna Guru (transl. The Silent Teacher) is a 2011 Indian Tamil-language action thriller film written and directed by Santhakumar and produced by M. K. Thamizharasu. The film stars Arulnidhi and Ineya, while John Vijay, Madhusudhan Rao, Uma Riyaz Khan, Krishnamoorthy, and Balakrishnan play supporting roles. Mouna Guru illustrates a misunderstood college youth whose life spirals downward when he unwittingly becomes involved in a crime plot.

The film's soundtrack has been composed by S. Thaman. It was released on 16 December 2011 and became a sleeper hit. The film was remade in Kannada as Guru, in Telugu as Shankara and in Hindi as Akira.

== Plot ==
Karunakaran finds it difficult to adjust with the society that he lives. As a result, he is unable to control his anger and ends up with trouble due to his unpredictable behavior, which becomes a constant worry for his mother and brother. A series of incidents force him to leave Madurai and end up in Chennai. Despite scoring high marks in school, he joins a local arts college in the city and stays in a hostel, where trouble begins. Aarthi, a medical student and the younger sister of Karuna's sister in-law, develops a soft corner for Karuna.

Meanwhile, ACP Marimuthu, Inspector Rajendran, SI Selvam, and HC Perumalsamy witness a car accident in the outskirts of Chennai. When they are about to take the victim to a nearby hospital, they come across a huge stash of cash. The policemen kill the half-dead victim and flee to Chennai with the money. However, Maya, a prostitute, learns the truth by overhearing Marimuthu's telephone conversation and records it. When Maya plans to threaten Marimuthu, she accidentally loses her camera which had the video footage. The next day, Marimuthu gets a threatening call from a guy and finds out that it was Maya who recorded his conversation. An enraged Marimuthu beats up Maya and eventually kills her.

A sincere cop named Palaniammal takes up this case. In the college where Karuna studies, there is a series of thefts happening in the hostel. Marimuthu finds out that one of the college students had actually stolen Maya's camera. One day, a bag containing all the stolen items is kept in Karuna's hostel room, making him as the prime suspect of all the threats, which leads him to get arrested. Marimuthu, along with his friends, kidnaps Karuna and Maya's friends with plans of killing them in a forest. They kill Maya's friends, but Karuna escapes from there and reaches Chennai. Meanwhile, Marimuthu finds that it was not Karuna who had blackmailed him. Karuna is falsely accused of mental instability by Marimuthu and his team of policemen and is institutionalised.

Karuna is kept under constant sedation with the help of a corrupt doctor. They forge a story that Karuna is suffering from a mental disorder which makes him think that he is being chased by a group of policemen for a fake encounter. Karuna escapes from the mental asylum and reaches his hostel. Karuna kidnaps Rajendran and threatens him to disclose all the truth to the public. Meanwhile, Palaniammal collects vital info and cracks the case. It is revealed that the person who stole Maya's camera was Dinesh, who happens to be the son of the college principal. Knowing this, the principal had tried to save Dinesh by keeping all the stolen items in Karuna's room during vacation, so that Karuna will return the things and all will be done.

When Palaniammal corners and is about to arrest the culprits in the college old auditorium, she gets a call from the commissioner that the person, who was murdered by Marimuthu and his team was a leading politician in Bangalore which could lead to state problems and hence does not disclose the incident to the media. Palaniammal is helpless and leaves the place. However, Karuna gets enraged and kills Marimuthu, Rajendran, Selvam, and Perumalsamy, where he is sentenced to psychological treatment (as he is falsely believed to have a mental disorder). After getting released, Karuna and Aarthi get married, where he works as a teacher in a deaf-dumb school.

== Cast ==
- Arulnidhi as Karunakaran
- Ineya as Aarthi
- John Vijay as Marimuthu
- Uma Riyaz Khan as Palaniammal
- Krishnamoorthy as Perumalsamy
- Madhusudhan Rao as Rajendran
- K. Balakrishnan as Selvam
- Sujatha Sivakumar as Karunakaran's mother
- Aadukalam Murugadoss as Babu
- Kaajal Pasupathi as Marimuthu's girlfriend
- Dinesh as Principal's son
- Kaali Venkat as Hospital compounder
- Ravi as commissioner
- Ravi Venkatraman as Constable Visu

== Production ==
Uma Riyaz Khan's character Palaniammal, a sincere police officer who is pregnant in her third trimester, was a character closely resembling Marge Gunderson from Fargo portrayed by Frances McDormand. Santhakumar revealed that it took five days just to shoot the scene that comes before the intermission although it appears for just 10 minutes in the film. Similarly the climax sequences were shot over a period of 15 days.

== Soundtrack ==
The film score and soundtrack are composed by S. Thaman and the album was released on 15 November 2011 across Tamil Nadu.

Track listing
No.	Title	Lyrics	Singer(s)	Length
1.	"Pudhupunal"	Vaali	Ranjith, Rahul Nambiar, Sam P. Keerthan & M. L. R. Karthikeyan	4:38
2.	"Yennayidhu"	Na. Muthukumar	Ranjith, Rahul Nambiar, Rita & Ramya NSK	4:15
3.	"Anaamika"	Madhan Karky	Karthik & Harini	3:28
4.	"Love"	Yugabharathi	Rahul Nambiar	1:18
5.	"Instrumental"		Thaman	2:13
Total length:				15:52

== Release and reception ==
The film was released on 16 December 2011. The Hindu gave the film a positive review citing that "Mouna Guru is one of the small gems of Tamil cinema this year" and that "it marks a promising debut for Shantakumar and advances Arulnidhi's career". Sify described the film as "very good", claiming it "works as an intelligent, taut thriller that sustains dramatic tension throughout". The critic also went on to claim that Arulnithi "drives the film with the intensity in his eyes, body language and an underplayed performance", while describing John Vijay's performance as "riveting". Pavithra Srinivasan of Rediff.com gave the film three and a half stars and described the film as a "must-watch", while mentioning that Uma Riyaz Khan "walks away with the honours".

== Accolades ==
At the 6th Vijay Awards, Uma Riyaz Khan won the Vijay Award for Best Supporting Actress.
