= List of Telugu songs recorded by Shweta Mohan =

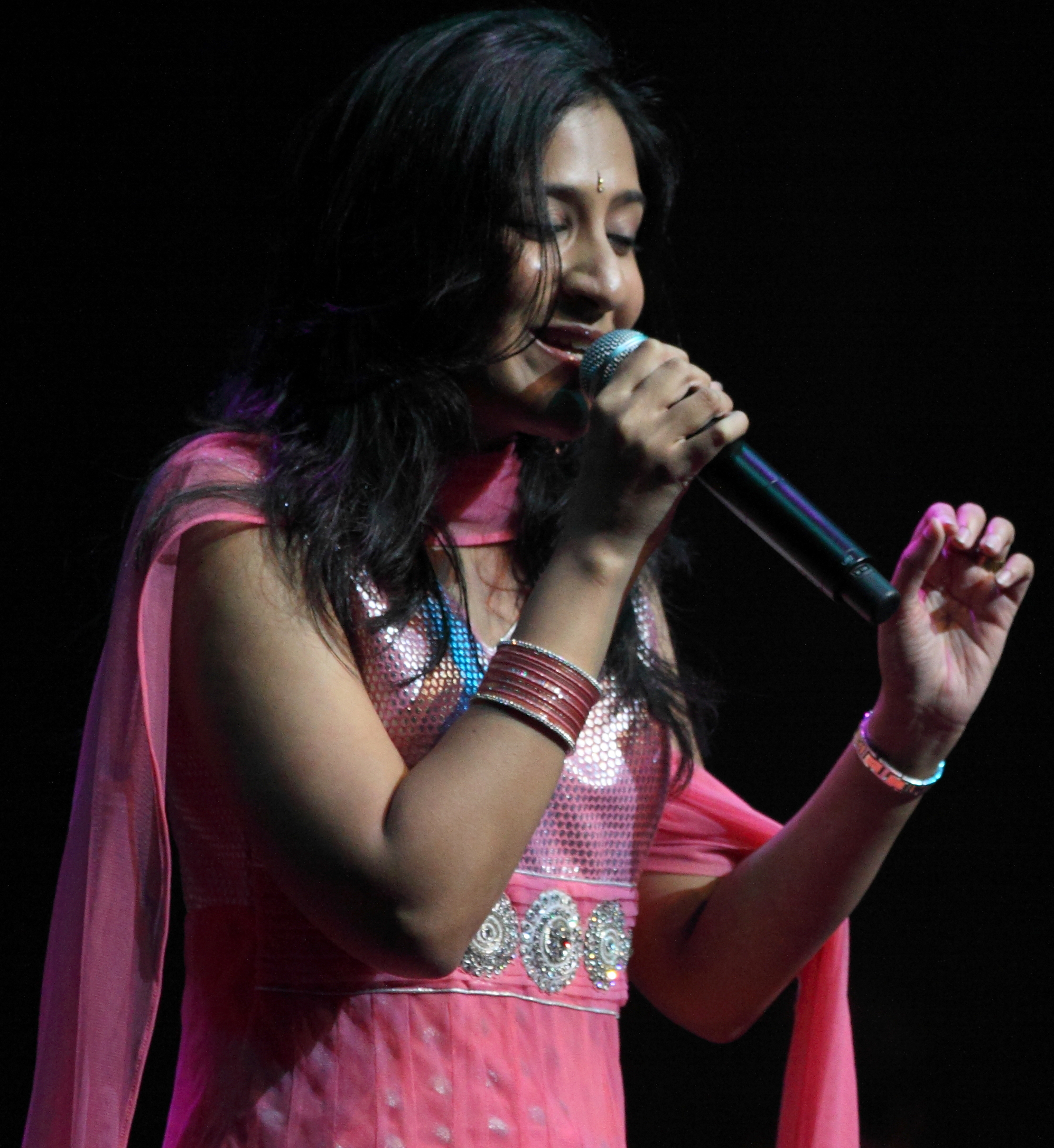

Shweta Mohan (born 19 November 1985) is an Indian playback singer. She has received four Filmfare Awards South for Best Female Playback Singer, one Kerala State Film Awards and one Tamil Nadu State Film Awards. She has recorded songs for film music and albums in all the four South Indian languages namely, Malayalam, Tamil, Telugu, Kannada along with the Hindi language and has established herself as a leading playback singer of South Indian cinema. Some of her inspirations are Sujatha Mohan (her mother), Alka Yagnik and K.S. Chitra.

== Film songs ==
=== 1995 ===
Film	No	Song	Composer(s)	Lyricist(s)	Co-artist(s)	Note(s)
Indira	1	"Jai Andamantha"	A. R. Rahman	Sirivennela Seetharama Sastry	Anuradha Sriram, G. V. Prakash, Sujatha	Dubbed Version
Bombay	2	"Kuchi Kuchi Koonamma"	A. R. Rahman	Veturi	Hariharan, G. V. Prakash, Swarnalatha, Sharadha	

=== 2006 ===
Film	No	Song	Composer(s)	Lyricist(s)	Co-artist(s)	Note(s)
Raam	3	"Nuvvena"	Yuvan Shankar Raja	Chandrabose	Haricharan	
Parinayam	4	"O Akka"	Ravindra Jain	Vennelakanti	Gopika Poornima	Dubbed Version

=== 2007 ===
Film	No	Song	Composer(s)	Lyricist(s)	Co-artist(s)
Aadavari Matalaku Arthale Verule	5	"Cheli Chamaku"	Yuvan Shankar Raja	Kandi Konda	Adnan Sami, Anushka Manchanda

=== 2008 ===
Film	No	Song	Composer(s)	Lyricist(s)	Co-artist(s)
Avakai Biryani	6	"Nannu Choopagala"	Manikanth Kadri	Bhaskarabhatla Ravi Kumar	Karthik
Bommana Brothers Chandana Sisters	7	"Poddunnemo Osari"	M. M. Srilekha	Bhaskarabhatla Ravi Kumar	Karthik
Siddu from Sikakulam	8	"Na Nababa Nanana"	K. M. Radha Krishnan	Bhoopal	K. M. Radha Krishnan
Malli Malli	9	"Magic Magic"	S. Thaman	Ananta Sriram	Karthik
Dongala Bandi	10	"Chetha Venna Mudda"	Valluri Rajashekar	Chandrabose	Rahul Nambiar

=== 2009 ===
Film	No	Song	Composer(s)	Lyricist(s)	Co-artist(s)	Note(s)
Rechipo	11	"Tholi Tholiga"	Mani Sharma	Bhaskarabhatla	Ranjith	
Villagelo Vinayakudu	12	"Chinukai Varadai"	Manikanth Kadri	Vanamali	Haricharan	
Jaganmohini	13	"Vennelala Vela Kannu"	Ilaiyaraaja	Vennelakanti	Sruthi	Dubbed Version
Satyameva Jayate	14	"Saaganee"	Chinna		Karthik	
Saarai Veerraju	15	"Allarantha Allukundi"	Sri Sai	Krishna Chaitanya		
Srisailam	16	"Muddutho"	Sri Sai	Srinivasa Paidithalli	V.V.Prasanna	
Ee Vayasulo	17	"Manasu Manavini"	Sambhu Prasad	Vanamali	Rahul	
Sweet Heart	18	"Paala Buggalunna"	Nara Raj	Gurucharan	Jassie Gift	

=== 2010 ===
Film	No	Song	Composer(s)	Lyricist(s)	Co-artist(s)	Note(s)
Puli	19	"Amma Thale"	A R Rahman	Chandrabose	Naresh Iyer	
Robo	20	"Boom Boom Robo Ra"	A R Rahman	Bhuvanachandra	Yogi B, Tanvi Shah, Keerthi Sagathia	Dubbed Version
Khaleja	21	"Piliche Pedavulapaina"	Mani Sharma	Sirivennela Sitaramasastri	Hemachandra	
Mouna Raagam	22	"Guppedantha Gudde"	S A Rajkumar	Vanamali	Karthik	
Seeta Ramula Kalyanam	23	"Nakkallo"(Female Version)	Anup Rubens	Ananta Sriram	Suji	
Love Journey	24	"Punnami Punnami"	Satish Chakravarthy	Vennelakanti	Vijay Yesudas	Dubbed Version
Chalaki	25	"Edo Jarigindante"	V. Harikrishna	Avinash	Karthik	

=== 2011 ===
Film	No	Song	Composer(s)	Lyricist(s)	Co-artist(s)	Note(s)
180	26	"Nee Maatalo Mounam"	Sharreth	Vanamali	Karthik	
Roudram	27	"Merisey Nee"	Prakash Nikki	Vanamali	Udit Narayan	Dubbed Version
7th Sense	28	"Amma Amma Kanne Puvva"	Harris Jayaraj	Vanamali	SPB	Dubbed Version
Rangam	29	"Nemali Kulukula"	Harris Jayaraj	Vanamali	P. Unnikrishnan	Dubbed Version
Priyudu	30	"Chinni Gunde Chaatuga"	Mohan Jona	Vanamali		
Sriramarajyam	31	"Sitharama Charitham"	Ilayaraja	Jonnavithhula Ramalingeswara Rao	Shreya Ghoshal	
Sriramarajyam	32	"Rama Rama Rama Ane"	Ilayaraja	Jonnavithhula Ramalingeswara Rao	Anitha Karthikeyan	
Sriramarajyam	33	"Shanku Chakralu"	Ilayaraja	Jonnavithhula Ramalingeswara Rao		
Sriramarajyam	34	"Idi Pattabhi"	Ilayaraja	Jonnavithhula Ramalingeswara Rao		
Rathinirvedam	35	"Nee Kosam"	M Jayachandran	Ponduri		
Rathinirvedam	36	"Madhumasa Mouna"	M Jayachandran	Ponduri		
100% Love	37	"Pantham Ekkado"	Devi Sri Prasad	Chandrabose	Haricharan	
100% Love	38	"Bharya Barthala"	Devi Sri Prasad	Chandrabose	Haricharan	
Manchivadu	39	"Anaganga Oka Chinnadi"	Sirpy	E S Murthy	Mukesh	
Vachadu Gelichadu	40	"Ichale Ichale"	S. Thaman	Bhaskarabhatla	Aalap Raju	Dubbed Version
Keratam	41	"Saadhyamena"	Joshua Sridhar	Rehaman	Karthik	
Maa Prema	42	"Sarigama"	Vishnu - Subbu			
Sega	43	"Oka Devatha"	Joshua Sridhar	Sri Mani	Benny, Clinton	

=== 2012 ===
Film	No	Song	Composer(s)	Lyricist(s)	Co-artist(s)	Note(s)
Sarocharu	44	"Kaatuka Kallu"	Devisri Prasad	Chandrabose	Khushi Murali, Chinnaponnu	
Gabbar Singh	45	"Dil Se"	Devisri Prasad	Bhaskarabhatla	Karthik	
Gajaraju	46	"Ayyayyo"(Female)	D. Imman	Vennelakanti		Dubbed Version
Ko Ante Koti	47	"Aagipo"	Shakthikanth Karthik	Vasishta Sharma	Karthik	
Genius	48	"Yevevo Kalale"	Joshua Sridhar	Anantha Sriram		
Eka Veera	49	"Nanda Kumara"	Karthik	Anantha Sriram		Dubbed Version
Shivani	50	"Yedhalola Nindi"(Reprise)	Sreejith-Sachin	Chandrabose		

=== 2013 ===
Film	No	Song	Composer(s)	Lyricist(s)	Co-artist(s)	Notes
Okkadine	51	"Hey Po"	Karthik	Krishna Chaitanya		
Bhai	52	"Nemmadiga Nemmadiga"	Devi Sri Prasad	Anantha Sriram	Venu Sriranga	
Singam II	53	"Teliyadule"	Devi Sri Prasad	Sahiti		Dubbed Version
Chirunavvula Chirujallu	54	"Gaalai Nenu"	Harris Jayaraj	Rakendu Mouli	VV Prasanna	Dubbed Version
Venkatadri Express	55	"Mella Mellega"	Ramana Gogula	Kasarla Shyam	Anjana Sowmya	
Mahankali	56	"Premouno"	Chinna	Sahitya Sagar		
Krrish 3	57	"God Allah A Bhagvan"	Rajesh Roshan	Rajshri Sudhakar	Rahul Nambiar	Dubbed Version
Aata Arrambam	58	"Neelaley Ninge paeley"	Yuvan Shankar Raja	A M Ratnam, SivaGanesh	Vijay Yesudas, Ranjith	Dubbed Version
Saradaga Ammayitho	59	"Oolaalla"	Ravi Varma	Unknown		
Dalam	60	"Ikkadanundi Ekkadidhaaka"	James Vasanthan	Sira Sri	Haricharan	

=== 2014 ===
Film	No	Song	Composer(s)	Lyricist(s)	Co-artist(s)	Note(s)
Manasunu Maaya Seyake	61	"Konnallu Kallalona"	Manikanth Kadri	Chandrabose	Vijay Yesudas	
Paisa	62	"Neetho Edo"	Sai Karthik	Sirivennela Sitaramasastri	Sai Karthik	
Rowdy	63	"Nee Meeda Ottu"	Sai Karthik	Ksarla Shyam	Karthik	
Aaha Kalyanam	64	"Urumu Mundo"	Dharan Kumar	Krishna Chaitanya	Naresh Iyer	
Kaththi	65	"Kottu Kottu Whistle"	Anirudh Ravichander	Bhuvanachandra	Mano	Dubbed Version
Yamaleela 2	66	"Daari Podugu"	S. V. Krishna Reddy	Ananta Sriram	M. L. R. Karthikeyan	

=== 2015 ===
Film	No	Song	Composer(s)	Lyricist(s)	Co-artist(s)	Notes
Nava Manmadhudu	67	"Emmannavo"	Anirudh Ravichander	Vennelakanti		Dubbed Version
Nava Manmadhudu	68	"Odini Lali"	Anirudh Ravichander	Vennelakanti	Dhanush	Dubbed Version
Vaaradhi	69	"Kanullo Kala"	Vijay Gorthi	Chaitanya Varma	Nivas	

=== 2016 ===
Film	No	Song	Composer(s)	Lyricist(s)	Co-artist(s)	Note(s)
Abhinetri	70	"Rang Rang Rangare"	Sajid–Wajid & Vishal Misra	Sreejo		
Nenu Sailaja	71	"Masti Masti"	Devisri Prasad	Anantha Sriram	Sooraj Santhosh	
Janatha Garage	72	"Nee Selvadigi"	Devisri Prasad	Ramajogayya Sastry		
Oka Manasu	73	"Hrudayama"	Sunil Kashyap	Ramajogayya Sastry	Vijay Yesudas	
Kabali	74	"Gunde Ninda Yenno"	Santhosh Narayanan	Ananta Sriram	Ananth, Pradeep Kumar	Dubbed Version
Dharmayogi	75	"Puvvula Vaasam"	Santhosh Narayanan	Ramajogayya Sastry	Anand Aravindakshan	Dubbed Version

=== 2017 ===
Film	No	Song	Composer(s)	Lyricist(s)	Co-artist(s)	Notes
Jaya Janaki Nayaka	76	"Nuvvele Nuvvele"	Devi Sri Prasad	Chandrabose		
Rarandoi Veduka Chudham	77	"Neevente Nenunte"	Devi Sri Prasad	Sri Mani	Kapil	
S3	78	"Musi Musi Navvula"	Harris Jayaraj	Sahiti	Aalap Raju, Karthik, Ramya NSK	Dubbed Version
Adirindi	79	"Maayo"	A R Rahman	Anantha Sriram	Sid Sriram	Dubbed Version
Rendu Rella Aaru	80	"Arere Yemaindhi"	Vijay Bulganin	Chandrabose	Anudeep Dev	
Seetha Ramuni Kosam	81	"Laali Laali"	Anil Gopi Reddy	Anil Gopi Reddy		
Seetha Ramuni Kosam	82	"Kalalonanta Vintala"	Anil Gopi Reddy	Anil Gopi Reddy		
Chandrullo Unde Kundelu	83	"Godaramma"	Vijay Gorti	Karunakar Adigarla	Naresh Iyer	

=== 2018 ===
Film	No	Song	Composer(s)	Lyricist(s)	Co-artist(s)	Note(s)
Kaala	84	"Chittamma"	Santhosh Narayanan	Vanamali	Ananthu	Dubbed Version
Manasuku Nachindi	85	"Gadichina Prathi"	Radhan	Anantha Sriram		

=== 2019 ===
Film	No	Song	Composer(s)	Lyricist(s)	Co-artist(s)
Lakshmi's NTR	86	"Gelupu Votami"	Kalyani Malik	Sira Sri	
Vishwamitra	87	"Naalo Nenu Lenu"	Anup Rubens	Srijo	
Kalki	88	"Evaro Evaro"	Shravan Baradwaj	Krishna Kanth	Vedala Hemachandra
Guna 369	89	"Manasukidhi Garalam"	Chaitan Bharadwaj	Ramajogayya Sastry	Vijay Yesudas
Saaho	90	"Baby Won't You Tell Me"	Shankar–Ehsaan–Loy	Krishna Kanth	Siddharth Mahadevan

=== 2020 ===
Film	No	Song	Composer(s)	Lyricist(s)	Co-artist(s)
Life Anubhavinchu Raja	91	"Edho Edho Kotha"	Ram	Srinivasa Mouli	Karthik

=== 2021 ===
Film	No	Song	Composer(s)	Lyricist(s)	Co-artist(s)	Note(s)
Rang De	92	"Rangule"	Devi Sri Prasad	Sri Mani		
99 Songs	93	"Poova Malli"	A. R. Rahman	Kalapradh	Sharanaya, Sireesha	Dubbed Version
Marakkar	94	"Kallaninda Kalalu"	Ronnie Raphael	Vennelakanti	Karthik, Zia Ul Haq	Dubbed Version
Garjana	95	"Iam Bad Boy"	Arul Dev	Hara Uppada	Ranjith	
Seethayanam	96	"Manasu Palike"	Padmanabh Bharadwaaj	Chandrabose		

=== 2022 ===
Film	No	Song	Composer(s)	Lyricist(s)	Co-artist(s)	Note(s)
Ante Sundaraniki	97	"Thandhanaanadha"	Vivek Sagar	Ramajogayya Sastry	Shankar Mahadevan	
Laatti	98	"Komma Remma"	Yuvan Shankar Raja	Chandrabose	Ranjith	Dubbed Version

=== 2023 ===
Film	No	Song	Composer(s)	Lyricist(s)	Co-artist(s)	Note(s)
Sir	99	"Mastaaru Mastaaru"	G. V. Prakash Kumar	Ramajogayya Sastry		
Adipurush	100	"Priya Mithunam"	Ajay-Atul	Ramajogayya Sastry	Karthik	
Karna	101	"Na Maata Vinara"	Prashanth BJ	Anil Inamadugu		
Are You Ok Baby	102	"Thalli Thandri"	Ilaiyaraaja			Dubbed Version
Valatty	103	"Manase Neetho"	Varun Sunil	Kittu Vissapragada	Ayraan	Dubbed Version
Spark L.I.F.E	104	"Radhesha"	Hesham Abdul Wahab	Anantha Sriram		

=== 2024 ===
Film	No	Song	Composer(s)	Lyricist(s)	Co-artist(s)	Note(s)
Manamey	105	"Sammohana"	Hesham Abdul Wahab	Ramajogayya Sastry	Hesham Abdul Wahab	
Lucky Baskhar	106	"Srimathi Garu"	G.V. Prakash Kumar	Sri Mani	Vishal Mishra	
Chaurya Paatham	107	"Thelisi Thelisi"	Davzand	Kalyana Chakravarthy	Haricharan	
Dhruva Nakshathram	108	"Oka Madhi"	Harris Jayaraj	Rakendu Mouli	Karthik	Dubbed Version
Geetha Shankaram	109	"Matti Burra"	Abu	Chandrabose		
Drinker Sai	110	"Ardham Kaneledu"	Sri Vasanth	Chandrabose		
Eleven	111	"Thaguvaadu Dorikene"	D. Imman	Rakendu Mouli		

=== 2025 ===
Film	No	Song	Composer(s)	Lyricist(s)	Co-artist(s)	Note(s)
Idli Kottu	112	"Kotthagundhe"	G.V. Prakash Kumar	Samrat Naidu	Krishna Tejasvi	Dubbed Version
Failure Boys	113	"Bangarame Bomma"	Vijai Bulganin	Karunakar Adigarla	Naresh Iyer	

=== 2026 ===
Film	No	Song	Composer(s)	Lyricist(s)	Co-artist(s)	Note(s)
Mana Shankara Vara Prasad Garu	114	"Meesaala Pilla"	Bheems Ceciroleo	Bhaskarabhatla	Udit Narayan	
Lenin	115	"Vaa Re Vaa"	Thaman S	Anantha Sriram	Jubin Nautiyal	
Ranabaali	116	"Endhayya Saami"	Ajay–Atul	Ramajogayya Sastry	Ajay Gogavale	
Band Melam	117	"Pallelloni Sandhallanni Meeve"	Vijai Bulganin	Chandrabose	Chorus	
Mareechika	118	"Andhee Andhani"	Ilaiyaraaja	Lakshmi Bhupala	Karthik	
Raja The Raja	119	"Oohale"	Mark K Robin	Krishna Kanth	Karthik	
Kaagitham Padavalu	120	"Chusaaley"	AIS Nowfal Raja	Rahman		
Haindava	121	"Evaraina"	Sam C. S.	Kittu Vissapragada	Kapil Kapilan	
Kokkoroko	122	"Seethakokamma"	S. Krishna Prasaad	Chandrabose	Kareemullah	

== Non-film songs ==
=== 2012 ===
Album	Song	Composer(s)	Lyricist(s)	Co-artist(s)
Saagara Sangamam	"Kanula Ninda Dachukunnanu""	Johny Dcruz	Bandi Stanley	

=== 2013 ===
Album	Song	Composer(s)	Lyricist(s)	Co-artist(s)
Trahimam 2	"Vinava Manavi"	Pranam Kamlakhar	A. R. Stievson	Solo
Trahimam 2	"Anandhamagu Mukti"	Pranam Kamlakhar	A. R. Stievson	Quincy Chetrupalli

=== 2015 ===
Album	Song	Composer(s)	Lyricist(s)	Co-artist(s)
Sthuthi	"Sthuthi Madhura (f)"	Afzal Yusuf	—N/a	Solo
Sthuthi	"Sthuthi Madhura (D)"	Afzal Yusuf	—N/a	Quincy Chetrupalli

=== 2016 ===
Album	Song	Composer(s)	Lyricist(s)	Co-artist(s)
Jushti	"Kammani Bahu Kammani"	K. Y. Ratnam	Joshua Shaik	Solo
Oohaku Andani	"Maruvagalana"	Jonah Samuel		Solo

=== 2017 ===
Album	Song	Composer(s)	Lyricist(s)	Co-artist(s)
Srastha	"Neeveyani Nammika"	Jonah Samuel	Devadas Ayyangaru	Solo
Srastha	"Tritvaikama"	Jonah Samuel	Unknown	Solo

=== 2018 ===
Album	Song	Composer(s)	Lyricist(s)	Co-artist(s)
Holy	"Koniyadachu Na"	J. K. Christopher	Maniprakash	Solo
Saphalatha	"Krupamaya"	Davidson Gajulavarthy	Ps.T.Christopher	
Christmas Jesus Songs	"Premaku Sati"	K. Y. Ratnam	Purushottam Babu	
Jeevadhipathi Naa Yesayya	"Premaku Sati"	K. Y. Ratnam	Anand Kumar & Usha Anand	
Athma Nimpuma	"Ningilo Devudu"	Madiri Linus	Kalaprapurna Jaladi	
Sneha Seeli	"Ammanu Minchina"	K Y Ratnam	Paul V Pridhvi	
Nee Padha Dhulini Yesayya		J. K. Christopher	Davud Joel Nethala	

=== 2019 ===
Album	Song	Composer(s)	Lyricist(s)	Co-artist(s)
Nannenthaga Preminchithivo	"Madhurathi"	K. Y. Ratnam	Joshua Shaik	Solo
Immenuelaina Naa Devudu	"Kalvagiripai Naa Yesayya"	K. Y. Ratnam	Suresh Nittala	
Yesayya Neekosam Brathakalani	"Kalalu Marina"	Samuel Mories	Samson Raju Gottumukkala	
Srastha 2	"Sarvalokha Prabuvunaku"	Prabhu Pammi	Devadas Mungamuri	
Prema	"Ankitham"	Abhishek Rubens		

=== 2024 ===
Album	Song	Composer(s)	Lyricist(s)	Co-artist(s)
Sthree- The Anthem	"Alalaa Yegisi"	Shweta Mohan	Vanamali	Solo

=== 2025 ===
Album	Song	Composer(s)	Lyricist(s)	Co-artist(s)
I Love You Cheppara (Indie Music Video)	"I Love You Cheppara"	Shweta Mohan	Anantha Sriram	Solo
