= Balakrishnudu =

2017 film

- Theatrical release poster
- Directed by: Mallela Pavan
- Written by: Raja Kolusu/Suryaa
- Produced by: B Mahendra Babu; Musunuru Vamsi krishna Sri Vinod Nandamuri
- Starring: Nara Rohit; Regina Cassandra; Ramya Krishna
- Cinematography: Vijay C. Kumar
- Edited by: Kotagiri Venkateswara Rao
- Music by: Mani Sharma
- Production companies: Saraschandrikaa Visionary Motion Pictures; MayaBazar Movies.
- Release date: 24 November 2017
- Running time: 130 minutes
- Country: India
- Language: Telugu

Balakrishnudu is a 2017 Indian Telugu-language romantic action comedy film directed by debutant Mallela Pavan. It features Nara Rohit, Regina Cassandra and Ramya Krishna in the lead roles, while Adithya Menon, Ajay, Kota Srinivasa Rao, and Pruthviraj play supporting roles. The music was composed by Mani Sharma with cinematography by Vijay C. Kumar and editing by Kotagiri Venkateswara Rao. The film released on 24 November 2017 to mixed reviews.

== Plot ==
Balu (Nara Rohit) is a free-spirited young man whose highest priority in life is earning money. Being an orphan, he is raised by Raghunandan Yadav (Kota Srinivasa Rao), who is his godfather. Balu’s life ends up in trouble because of his lust for money. His love life with Aadhya (Regina Cassandra) is also twisted because of that.

== Cast ==
- Nara Rohit as Balakrishna (Balu)
- Regina Cassandra as Aadhya
- Ramya Krishna as Bhanumati Devi
- Adithya Menon as Ravinder Reddy
- Ajay as Pratap Reddy
- Kota Srinivasa Rao as Raghunandan Yadav
- Pruthviraj as Madhava Rao (Maddy R)
- Chalapathi Rao
- Ramaraju
- Vennela Kishore as Kishore
- Raghu Babu as Peddha Paleru
- Raghu Karumanchi as Rowdy
- Srinivasa Reddy as Chitti Babu
- Ravi Varma as Mastan
- Aathma Patrick as Bala
- Shravya Reddy as Padma
- Tejaswi Madivada
- Satya Krishnan
- Thagubothu Ramesh
- Vizag Prasad
- Duvvasi Mohan
- Gemini Suresh
- Mahesh Achanta
- Jabardasth Appa Rao
- Avantika Vandanapu as Young Aadhya
- Priyanka Singh
- Diksha Panth as cameo appearance
- Pia Bajpai in a special appearance

== Production ==
=== Filming ===
The filming began on 31 March 2017, a year after the script was given a green signal. Producers Nandamuri Sri Vinod and Musunuru Vamsi Krishna, who also happen to be director Mallela Pavan’s childhood friends, are producing the movie on their banner Saraschandrikaa Visionary Motion Pictures in collaboration with Maya Bazar Movies of B. Mahendra Babu. The major part of the movie was shot in different locations of Hyderabad while the songs were shot in Bergen and Oslo in Norway. With a total number of shoot days being around 50, the film was in its post-production stage.

== Soundtrack ==
The audio and background score were composed by Mani Sharma and released by Aditya Music. The film marks his third collaboration with Nara Rohit after Baanam and Solo. Samantha Ruth Prabhu released the audio in an event on 10 November 2017.

Balakrishnudu

Soundtrack album by Mani Sharma
- Released: 10 November 2017
- Recorded: 2017
- Genre: Soundtrack
- Length: 24:03
- Label: Aditya Music
- Producer: Mani Sharma

Mani Sharma chronology
LIE (2017)	Balakrishnudu (2017)	Okka Kshanam (2017)

Track list
No.	Title	Lyrics	Singer(s)	Length
1.	"Entha Varalaina"	Krishna Kanth	Revanth	3:52
2.	"Thariraa Thariraa"	Srivalli	Ramya Behara	3:53
3.	"Anukunnadi"	Srivalli	Surya Pavan Bonila, Sahithi Chaganti	4:28
4.	"Ardharathri Sureedu"	Kasarla Shyam	Ramya Behara	4:31
5.	"Rende Rendu Kallu"	Srivalli	Anurag Kulkarni, Sahithi Chaganti	3:26
6.	"Raashi Thariraa"	Srivalli	Raashii Khanna	3:53
Total length:				24:03

== Reception ==
Sridhar Adivi of The Times of India rated the film 2.5/5 and wrote, "For Telugu audiences who have been exposed to scores of faction films over the years, there is nothing new that the film has to offer". Srivathsan Nadadhur of The Hindu wrote, "The lacklustre narrative with peripheral performances makes this a cringe-worthy outing". A critic from The Hans India wrote "The film has a routine story and we do not find anything new but still, the director has tried to present it in a different manner and made us stuck to the film. The director took a lot of care in comedy which worked well in the theatres".
