= Aran Media Works =

Indian film production company

- Company type: Private
- Industry: Entertainment
- Founders: Nara Rohit; Sree Vishnu; Krishna Vijay
- Headquarters: India
- Area served: India
- Key people: Nara Rohit; Sree Vishnu; Krishna Vijay
- Products: Films
- Owners: Nara Rohit; Sree Vishnu; Krishna Vijay

Aran Media Works is an Indian film production company established by Nara Rohit, Sree Vishnu, and Krishna Vijay.

== Film production ==
No	Year	Film	Language	Actors	Director	Notes
1	2015	Asura	Telugu	Nara Rohit, Priya Banerjee	Krishna Vijay	Co Production with Devas Media and Entertainment and Kushal cinema
2	2016	Appatlo Okadundevadu	Telugu	Nara Rohit, Sree Vishnu, Tanyahope	Sagar K Chandra	
3	2017	Kathalo Rajakumari	Telugu	Nara Rohit Naga Shourya Srinivas Avasarala	Mahesh Surapaneni	Co Production with Aarohi Cinema
4	2018	Needi Naadi Oke Katha	Telugu	Sree Vishnu, Satna Titus	Udugula Venu	
5	2024	Sundarakanda	Telugu	Nara Rohit, Virti Vaghani, Sridevi Vijaykumar	Venkatesh Nimmalapudi	Co Production
