= Prathinidhi =

- Movie poster
- Directed by: Prashanth Mandava
- Written by: Anand Ravi
- Produced by: Sambasiva Rao
- Starring: Nara Rohit; Shubra Aiyappa
- Cinematography: Chitti Babu.K
- Edited by: Nandamuri Hari
- Music by: Sai Karthik
- Production company: Sudha Cinemas
- Distributed by: Dil Raju
- Release date: 25 April 2014
- Running time: 118 minutes
- Country: India
- Language: Telugu
- Box office: ₹7 crore distributors' share

Prathinidhi (English: Representative) is a 2014 Indian Telugu-language political thriller film produced by J Samba Siva Rao under Sudha cinemas. It was directed by debutant Prashanth Mandava. The film stars Nara Rohit and Shubra Aiyappa in the lead roles. Music is composed by Sai Karthik. The film received positive reviews from critics and the audience. This film was remade in Tamil as Ko 2. A spiritual sequel titled Prathinidhi 2 was released in May 2024.

Shooting launched on 26 June 2013 at Hyderabad.

== Plot ==
In the starting scene, a mysterious figure who calls himself "the common man" kidnaps Sambasiva Rao, the Chief Minister of Andhra Pradesh, at a private old-age home event in Hyderabad. The news goes viral, and everyone from the local to the cabinet starts taking the issue personally. The Home Minister appoints Police Commissioner Anjanaprasad to rescue the CM. He gets hold of Srikar, who helped him kidnap the CM. Srikar tells Anjanaprasad how he met Manchodu Srinu and Sunaina. As cops strive to find clues about the kidnapper, Seenu comes out with wacky yet valid demands that mostly concern Indian currency and the economy. The rest of the story is about Seenu's background and why he kidnapped Sambasiva Rao.

== Cast ==
- Nara Rohit as Manchodu Sreenu aka Common Man
- Shubra Aiyappa as Sunaina
- Sree Vishnu as Srikar
- Kota Srinivasa Rao as Chief Minister Sambasiva Rao
- Jaya Prakash Reddy as Home Minister
- Ranganath as DGP Ranganath
- Posani Krishna Murali as Police Commissioner Anjanaprasad
- Ravi Prakash as Assistant Commissioner Ravi Prakash
- Giribabu as textile minister and father of Srikar
- Laxman Meesala

== Soundtrack ==
Prathinidhi

Soundtrack album by Sai Karthik
- Released: 13 November 2013
- Recorded: 2013
- Genre: Feature film soundtrack
- Length: 19:28
- Label: Aditya Music
- Producer: Sai Karthik

Sai Karthik chronology
Priyathama Neevachata Kusalama (2013)	Prathinidhi (2013)	Noothi Lo Kappalu (2015)

The soundtrack was composed by Sai Karthik and was released by Aditya Music.

Track-List
No.	Title	Lyrics	Artist(s)	Length
1.	"Vandemataram"	B. Subbaraya Sharma, Akhilesh Reddy	Dhanunjay	3:36
2.	"Maa Maata"	B. Subbaraya Sharma	M. L. R. Karthikeyan	4:16
3.	"Chupullo Paravasham"	Balaji	Rahul Nambiar	3:42
4.	"Nee Teguvaki"	B. Subbaraya Sharma	Ranjith	4:07
5.	"Vaishnava Janato"	Narsimha Mehta	Baby Thillu, Siddharth	2:35
6.	"Prathinidhi, Pt. 1 (Dialogue Version)"		Nara Rohit	0:37
7.	"Prathinidhi, Pt. 1 (Dialogue Version)"		Nara Rohit	0:35
Total length:				19:28

== Critical reception ==
The Times of India rated it 3.5/5 and wrote, "On the whole, it is a movie that makes the public think. The film does not have those spicy Tollywood ingredients that make for an entertainer. Which is why, it is a refreshing and worth a watch to get our conscience stirred up. ". Idlebrain rated the film 3.25/5 and wrote, "Pratinidhi works because of good writing, decent execution and terrific performances despite cheap production values and inferior technical stuff."

== Sequel ==
A spiritual sequel titled Prathinidhi 2, directed by Murthy Devagupthapu was announced in July 2023. The film was later theatrically released on 10 May 2024 and became a box-office disappointment.
