= Tenali Ramakrishna BA. BL =

- Theatrical release poster
- Directed by: G. Nageswara Reddy
- Screenplay by: G. Nageswara Reddy
- Story by: Raaja Simha
- Produced by: Agraharam Nagi Reddy Sanjeev Reddy; Roopa Jagadeesh
- Starring: Sundeep Kishan; Hansika Motwani; Varalaxmi Sarathkumar
- Cinematography: Sai Sriram
- Edited by: Chota K. Prasad
- Music by: Sai Karthik
- Release date: 15 November 2019
- Running time: 128 minutes
- Country: India
- Language: Telugu

Tenali Ramakrishna BA. BL is a 2019 Telugu-language courtroom action comedy film directed by G. Nageswara Reddy. The film stars Sundeep Kishan, Hansika Motwani, and Varalaxmi Sarathkumar. This film marks the Telugu debut of Varalaxmi Sarathkumar.

== Plot ==
Tenali Ramakrishna, a money-minded lawyer, loses or wins lawsuits depending on how he benefits from them. Things take a turn when he is tasked with a criminal case and decides to fight for justice that changes his life forever.

== Cast ==
- Sundeep Kishan as Adv. Tenali Ramakrishna BA. BL
- Hansika Motwani as Adv. Rukmini
- Varalaxmi Sarathkumar as Varalakshmi Devi, who has committed scam of 50 billions and Murderer of Journalist Bhupal
- Ayyappa P. Sharma as Simhadri Naidu; rival to Varalakshmi Devi later joins hands with her.
- Raghu Babu as Tenali Durga Rao, a broker and Ramakrishna's father
- Murali Sharma as Adv. Chakravarthy, a criminal lawyer and Rukmini's father, who opposes Tenali and Rukmini's relationship
- Vennela Kishore as Kovelakuntla Kishore
- Y. Vijaya as Varalakshmi Devi's mother
- Prabhas Sreenu as Adv. Sreenu, Tenali Ramakrishna's colleague.
- Rajitha as Mrs. Chakravarthy, Rukmini's mother
- Saptagiri as Giri
- Posani Krishna Murali as a Judge
- Annapoorna as Kishore's grandmother
- Satya Krishnan as Fake Witness
- Chammak Chandra as Varalakshmi Devi's henchman
- Geetha Singh
- Bhupal Raju as Journalist Bhupal

== Soundtrack ==
Tenali Ramakrishna BA. BL

Soundtrack album by Sai Karthik
- Released: 2019
- Recorded: 2019
- Genre: Feature film soundtrack
- Length: 9:18
- Label: Shreyas Music
- Producer: Sai Karthik

Sai Karthik chronology
Burra Katha (2019)	Tenali Ramakrishna BA. BL (2019)	Gully Rowdy (2021)
External audio
- Official Audio Jukebox on YouTube

The music was composed by Sai Karthik.

Track list
No.	Title	Lyrics	Singer(s)	Length
1.	"Ramkrishna Tenali"	Bhaskarabhatla	Sai Madhav	2:43
2.	"Kurnool Katthiva"	Chilaka Rekka Ganesh	Dhanunjay	3:09
3.	"Peechumittai Pillaro"	Dathu, Vishnu Priya	Bhaskarabhatla	3:16
Total length:				9:18

== Release ==
The film was dubbed and released in Tamil as Naveena Thenali.

== Critical reception ==
Sify wrote "This time-tested theme of a comedy-looking guy turning into a righteous person of an incident still has some scope to generate laughs, engage us but the writers' team has employed old tricks to provide comedy. They have relied more on one-liners." Times of India wrote "Tenali Ramakrishna BA BL is a sloppy courtroom drama that tries too hard to be funny. A huge thumbs down!". The Hindu wrote "Barring a couple of bright moments, this is a boring courtroom drama with a middling narrative". 123Telugu wrote "On the whole, Tenali Rama Krishna is a comedy caper aimed at the target audience of single screens. The film has an impressive first half with good comedy and twists. But the second half is a let down because of jaded narration and over the top scenes".
