= Ego (2018 film) =

2018 film directed by R.V. Subramanyam

- Directed by: R.V. Subramanyam
- Written by: R.V. Subramanyam
- Produced by: Anil Kiran; Kaushal Kiran; Vijay Kiran
- Starring: Aashish Raj Bidkikar; Simran Sharma
- Cinematography: Prasad GK
- Edited by: Shiva Y Prasad
- Music by: Sai Karthik
- Distributed by: VKA Films
- Release date: 5 January 2018
- Running time: 122 minutes
- Country: India
- Language: Telugu

Ego is a 2018 Indian Telugu-language drama film written and directed by R.V. Subramanyam. It stars Aashish Raj Bidkikar and Simran Sharma.

== Cast ==
- Aashish Raj Bidkikar as Gopi
- Simran Sharma as Indu
- Prudhvi Raj as CI Aavugadda Apparao
- Posani Krishna Murali as Police Inspector Satyanarayan
- Ajay as DCP
- Diksha Panth
- Rao Ramesh as Soundarajan
- Snigda
- Chammak Chandra as Jeeva
- Gautam Raju
- Shakalaka Shankar as Shankar
- Kyra Dutt...Special appearance in song "O Naatu Kurroda"

== Soundtrack ==
No.	Title	Singer(s)	Length
1.	"Emo Idivarakemo"	Shreya Ghoshal, Dinkar
2.	"O Naatu Kurroda"	Aparna Nandan, Prativa
3.	"Akkada Undo"	Sai Charan
4.	"Kurrodu Perfect"	Anurag Kulkarni
5.	"O Buri Buggala"	Sai Karthik

== Reception ==
The Hans India gave 2.75 stars stating, "The movie is good in parts and could have been much better than what it was now".
