= Prathinidhi 2 =

2024 film by Murthy Devagupthapu

- Theatrical release poster
- Directed by: Murthy Devagupthapu
- Written by: Murthy Devagupthapu
- Produced by: Kumarraza Bathula; Anjaneyulu Sri Thota; Surendranath Bollineni
- Starring: Nara Rohit; Siri Lella
- Cinematography: Nani Chamidisetty
- Edited by: Ravi Teja Girijala
- Music by: Mahati Swara Sagar
- Production companies: Vanara Entertainments; Rana Arts
- Release date: 10 May 2024
- Running time: 136 minutes
- Country: India
- Language: Telugu

Prathinidhi 2 (transl. Representative 2) is a 2024 Indian Telugu-language political thriller film written and directed by Murthy Devagupthapu. A sequel to Prathinidhi (2014), the film stars Nara Rohit and Siree Lella, while Dinesh Tej, Jisshu Sengupta, and Sachin Khedekar play supporting roles. The film released on 10 May 2024 and received mixed-to-negative reviews.

== Cast ==
- Nara Rohit as Chetan
- Siri Leela as Chetan love interest
- Dinesh Tej as Chief Minister Viswa
- Jisshu Sengupta as CBI Officer Vikram Santhosh
- Sachin Khedekar as Chief Minister Prajapathi
- Tanikella Bharani
- Indraja
- Udaya Bhanu as Udayabhanu
- Ajay Ghosh as Finance Minister Gajendra
- Ajay as Prabhat Mishra
- Praveen
- Prudhvi Raj
- Raghu Babu
- Raghu Karumanchi
- Srikanth Iyengar
- Saptagiri
- Mangam Srinivas

== Release ==
The film was initially scheduled to release in theatres on 25 April 2024 before being pushed to 10 May 2024.

== Reception ==
Critics from News18, The Times of India Samayam and The Hindustan Times rated the film two-and-a-half out of five. A critic from Asianet News rated the film two out of five. A critic from Times Now rated the film one-and-a-half out of five stars and wrote that "Prathinidhi 2 is devoid of a strong narrative and gripping screenplay. The film wants to be a political-investigative thriller without caring to understand the nuances of the genre".
