= Yeidhavan =

- Poster
- Directed by: Sakthi Rajasekaran
- Produced by: S. Sudhakaran
- Starring: Kalaiyarasan; Satna Titus
- Cinematography: Premkumar Chandran
- Edited by: I. J. Alen
- Music by: Paartav Barggo
- Production company: Friends Festival Films
- Release date: 12 May 2017
- Country: India
- Language: Tamil

Yeidhavan (transl. The Man Who Aims) is a 2017 Indian Tamil-language crime action film written and directed by Sakthi Rajasekaran and produced by S. Sudhakaran. The film stars Kalaiyarasan and Satna Titus and C. Premkumar handling the camera. The music was composed by Paartav Barggo, and editing was done by I. J. Alen. The film released on 12 May 2017 .

== Plot ==
The film begins with Krishna narrating to the audience that he wants to kill two people. One of them, Sarathi, is right in front of him, and he starts following him on his bike. Sarathi goes into a dark place and is blocked by two guys. Sarathi takes out his gun and tries to shoot them. Krishna, who has been watching this, pounces on Sarathi and saves the two guys, Sagaa and Dharman. Dharma kills Sarathi and thanks Krishna, and they become friends.

A flashback reveals Krishna's story. He has a family, and his sister wants to become a doctor. Despite getting good marks in her +2 exams, she is unable to secure a seat in the Govt. Medical College. Because of this, Krishna decides to admit her in a private college. He somehow manages to find a seat with help from some middlemen and pays around 60 lakhs for that. Soon, he learns that the college has been denied NCA approval, and the students who got admitted there are now helpless. When Krishna enquires in the college, he gets a reply that he paid the capitation to middlemen and should contact them further. Sarathi happens to be the middleman, and he attacks Krishna when he asks for the money. Krishna then files a police complaint with the help of his fiancée Janani, who is a sub-inspector.

Meanwhile, a youngster is robbed off his money and car by a group of thieves at night, and he is Gourav, who is the rich son of Gupta, an industrialist and the owner of the medical college. The thief ties Gourav almost naked to a pole and takes away his BMW. Gourav is rescued in the morning by an ongoer and vows to take revenge against the thief.

The affected students now start their protests, and suddenly, Krishna's sister is killed in what appears to be an accident. Krishna vows to take revenge against the killers, whom he believes to be the owner of the college, Gourav, but he controls his anger. He decides to help the students and plans to get his revenge slowly.

Meanwhile, Gourav's BMW is found, and the thief is revealed to be Dharman. Gourav's men track Dharman, and they capture him and take him to Gourav, who wants him killed. However, Dharman attacks the driver and slams the car onto Krishna's sister, thus killing her. Dharman escapes and vows to take revenge against Gourav. Hearing this story from Dharman, Krishna too reveals to Dharman that his second target is Gourav, and they both decide to help each other and kill Gourav. However, Krishna silently plots his revenge against Dharman too, who happened to kill his sister in the accident.

Krishna threatens Gourav's assistant Karna and gets important details regarding the capitation fee and uses this as a bait against Gourav. Gourav is searching for the guy who is the reason behind this, and he is unable to find him. Krishna and Dharman plan to lure Gourav into a trap and kill him. They plan that Dharman will inform Gourav about Krishna and his plans and will make him come to a place with cash, in exchange for Krishna. However, Gourav asks Dharman to kill Krishna and take the money. Dharman backstabs Krishna and attacks him. Gourav uses this to kill Sagaa with a gun and hurt Dharman. Krishna manages to fight off Gourav and gain control. When he is about to kill him, the students come in and request Krishna not to kill Gourav, as they all wanted to become doctors and they do not want to kill someone to get back their money. Krishna insults Gourav that he is worse than Dharman, who will do anything for money, but even after being so rich, Gourav is doing dirty things to get more money, which makes him nothing more than a scumbag. Gourav is touched by this and feels guilty. As Krishna and the students leave the place, a gunshot is heard and the film ends, implying that Gourav has shot himself.

== Cast ==
- Kalaiyarasan as Krishna
- Satna Titus as Janani
- Vela Ramamoorthy as Krishna's father
- Aadukalam Naren as Karna
- Rajkumar as Vasu
- Charles Vinoth as Chidambaram
- Goutham as Gourav
- Valavan as Sarathi
- Krishna Kumar as Dharman
- Sarithiran as Sagaa
- Rafiq as Recharge Shop Boy
- Sandra Amy as Maarika in a Guest Appearance

== Production ==
Production for the film began in January 2016, with Kalaiyarasan joining up with newcomer director Sakthi Rajasekaran for the project. Satna Titus signed up to play the leading female role of a police officer in the film, before the release of her breakthrough film Pichaikkaran (2016). The team finished production for the film in April 2016. The film's first look was released in August 2016 by director Pa. Ranjith, while a teaser was released by actor Vijay Sethupathi during the same month.

== Critical reception ==
Indiaglitz rated the film 2.8/5, and wrote "Yeidhavan’ is an engaging action thriller which also throws light on a corrupt network that seriously affects the quality of medical education in Tamil Nadu." Chennai Vision rated the film 2.75/5 and wrote "Sakthi Rajasekaran has done his research well on the subject. Had he infused more pace, Yeidhavan would have been a great movie." Baradwaj Rangan rated the film 2.5/5, and wrote "Too much talk, but this thriller isn’t entirely disposable either." The Hindu wrote in its review "What many of director Shankar’s protagonists did was to fight corruption with style but Yeidhavan only sends across a message and stops at that." starts off well enough and peters out into mediocrity fast "kollywood kapsa" won best debutant director 2017 award from teakadaicinema awards
