= Sree Vishnu =

Indian actor

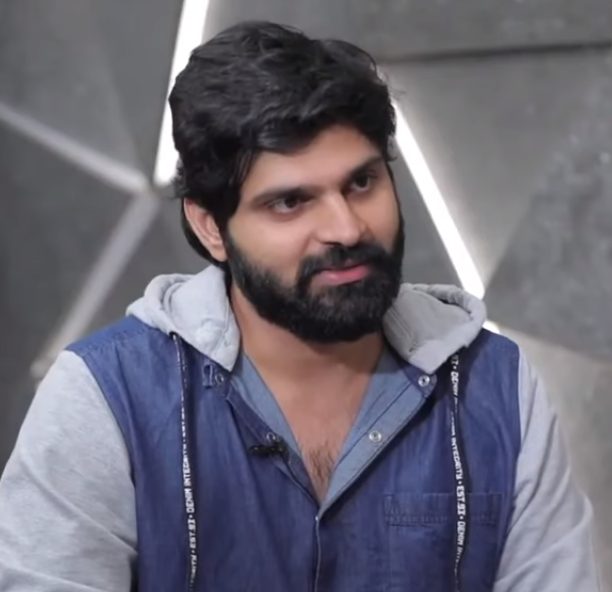
- Vishnu in 2024
- Born: Rudraraju Vishnuvardhan; 29 February 1984 (age 42); Antarvedipalem, Andhra Pradesh, India
- Education: Gandhi Institute of Technology and Management
- Occupation: Actor
- Years active: 2009–present

Sree Vishnu (born Rudraraju Vishnuvardhan; 29 February 1984) is an Indian actor who works in Telugu cinema. After appearing in minor roles, Vishnu got his breakthrough with Prema Ishq Kaadhal (2013). He later starred in supporting roles in films such as Second Hand (2013), Appatlo Okadundevadu (2016), Vunnadhi Okate Zindagi (2017). For the lattermost, he was nominated for a SIIMA Award for Best Supporting Actor – Telugu.

He expanded to leading roles in successful comedies like Mental Madhilo (2017), Brochevarevarura (2019), Raja Raja Chora (2021), Samajavaragamana (2023), Om Bheem Bush (2024) and Single (2025).

== Early life ==
Sree Vishnu was born in Antarvedipalem of East Godavari district, Andhra Pradesh. He graduated in Bachelor of Business Management (Honors) from Gandhi Institute of Technology and Management, Visakhapatnam. He worked as a web designer in Hyderabad till 2006, after which he quit to pursue a career in the film industry and started as an assistant director.

While in college he was a member of the theatre group. He also played for the under-19 Andhra cricket team. Vishnu is a friend of fellow actor Nara Rohit and has collaborated with him in several films.

== Career ==
Vishnu acted in several short films. One of them, "Bewars" directed by Pavan Sadineni, became popular on YouTube. His first film roles were minor ones in Baanam and Solo. In 2013, he was approached by Pavan Sadineni, for a lead role in the film Prema Ishq Kaadhal. In a review of Second Hand (2013) by The Times of India, the reviewer wrote that "Vishnu sparkles with his dialogue delivery". In 2014, he acted in Nara Rohit's Prathinidhi as a home minister's son.

Following a few other minor roles, in 2016 he had a lead role in the film Appatlo Okadundevadu. He later starred in notable films Brochevarevarura (2019) and Samajavaragamana (2023).

In 2024, he featured in Om Bheem Bush, directed by Sree Harsha Konuganti and Swag.

In 2026, Sree Vishnu’s film Vishnu Vinyasam had its release date advanced by one day, moving from 28 February to 27 February 2026 to align with a Friday theatrical release.

== Filmography ==
Key
†	Denotes films that have not yet been released

- All films are in Telugu, unless otherwise noted.

Year	Title	Role	Notes	Ref.
2009	Baanam	Academy officer	Debut film	
2011	Solo	Vishnu		
2012	Kadhalil Sodhappuvadhu Yeppadi/Love Failure	Rupesh	Uncredited role; Bilingual film; Tamil Debut	
2012	Naa Ishtam	Ganesh's friend		
2012	Life Is Beautiful	Ashok		
2013	Prema Ishq Kaadhal	Royal Raju	Debut as Lead Actor	
2013	Second Hand	Chaitanya		
2013	Okkadine	Sailaja's brother		
2014	Prathinidhi	Srikar		
2015	S/O Satyamurthy	Bhadram		
2015	Asura	Himself	Cameo appearance in the song "Sukumaara"	
2016	Appatlo Okadundevaadu	Railway Raju		
2016	Jayammu Nischayammu Raa	Kantha Rao		
2017	Maa Abbayi	Abbayi		
2017	Vunnadhi Okate Zindagi	Vasu	Nominated–SIIMA Award for Best Supporting Actor – Telugu	
2017	Mental Madhilo	Aravind Krishna		
2018	Needi Naadi Oke Katha	Rudraraju Sagar		
2018	Veera Bhoga Vasantha Rayalu	Veera Bhoga Vasantha Rayalu "Nikhil"		
2019	Brochevarevarura	Rahul		
2019	Thipparaa Meesam	Mani Shankar		
2021	Gaali Sampath	Suri		
2021	Raja Raja Chora	Bhaskar		
2021	Arjuna Phalguna	Arjuna		
2022	Bhala Thandanana	Chandra		
2022	Alluri	Alluri Sita Ramaraju		
2023	Samajavaragamana	Balu		
2024	Om Bheem Bush	Krishnakanth "Krish" Gundagani and Madhana Manoharudu (Note: Sree Vishnu plays dual roles in this film.)	Dual role	
2024	Swag	King Bhavabhuthi, Yayathi, Vibhuthi (Dhanubhuthi) and SI Bhavabhuthi, Singareni "Singa" (Note: Sree Vishnu plays five roles in this film.)	Five roles	
2025	Single	Vijay		
2026	Nari Nari Naduma Murari	Arya	Cameo appearance	
2026	Vishnu Vinyasam	Vishnu		
2026	Mrithyunjay	Jay		
2026	Gaayapadda Simham	Bhairav Das	Extended cameo	
2026	Comrade Kalyan	Kalyan		
