= Asura (2015 film) =

2015 Telugu film

- Release poster
- Directed by: Krishna Vijay
- Screenplay by: Krishna Vijay
- Produced by: Shyam Devabhaktuni; Krishna Vijay; Nara Rohit
- Starring: Nara Rohit; Priya Banerjee
- Cinematography: S. V. Vishweshwar
- Edited by: Dharmendra Kakarala
- Music by: Sai Karthik
- Production companies: Devas Media and Entertainment; Kushal Cinema; Aran Media Works
- Release date: 5 June 2015
- Running time: 122 minutes
- Country: India
- Language: Telugu

Asura (transl. Demon) is a 2015 Telugu language film, the first directed by Krishna Vijay. It was produced by Shyam Devabhaktuni and Krishna Vijay, and stars Nara Rohit and Priya Banerjee. It received a positive reception and was declared a box office hit.

== Plot ==
Dharma Teja (Nara Rohith) is a jailor at Rajahmundry Central Jail who is strict and sincere but also sensitive and kindhearted. In his department, people call him a demon because of his anger and strictness. He aims to become a poet and works on it in his free time. Dharma has different thoughts on prisoner reformation and does not mind breaking the law to do good for others. One day, Chandrashekar "Charlie", a former diamond merchant, is sentenced to death on charges of killing his stepmother's siblings for the sake of their property. In jail, Charlie meets a thief called Pandu.

Pandu is vengeful against Charlie because he once tried to steal diamonds from Charlie, and when Charlie caught him, he made him handicapped and sent him to jail. After hearing the news through his girlfriend Saira, Charlie decides to escape from jail. Then, he makes a deal with Pandu to give half the diamonds. He had once tried to steal two diamonds from him to escape from jail, which was worth 500 million rupees. Pandu forgets his enmity with Charlie and accepts his offer. Then, Charlie arranges bail for Pandu. He meets gangsters Muthyammanna and his brother Daya and offers to help. They ake a plan to escape Charlie from prison. Meanwhile, Charlie survived temporarily from hanging through a drug and fell asleep.

In the investigation, Dharma knows that Saira supplied the drug through a sweets box during the visiting hours. He arrests Saira and threatens her to tell Charlie's further plans. Saira tells everything she knows to Dharma, and they try to implement the death penalty again for Charlie. Meanwhile, Daya and his gang kidnap a magistrate's son who is approving Charlie's death, the mother of the hangman who executes Charlie, and Dharma's girlfriend Harika. They call each other unknown and blackmail them into helping Charlie escape. Dharma takes it as a challenge to save his girlfriend and execute Charlie. Meanwhile, in the execution room, the hangman saves Charlie, creating a technical problem in the execution of the mission.

The higher officials take severe action against Dharma. Later in the investigation, he discovers Charlie and Pandu's meeting. In the search for Pandu, he successfully went to his hideout. In a rough chase, Daya kills Pandu to increase his share and reveals that after escaping from Charlie, Daya will kill him and grab the diamonds that Charlie has, which Muthyammanna does not know.

The commissioner transfers Dharma to his office as punishment for charges of negligence of duty. Then, the commissioner takes it as a challenge and transfers Charlie to the special jail under his control. Taking it as an advantage, Muthyammanna and Daya attack the police on the way and successfully have Charlie escape, whose face is covered with a cloth. Suddenly, to their shock, Dharma enters and attacks them. While in a shootout, Charlie injures Daya and escapes successfully, and Dharma kills Daya. After that, the police alert the public to Charlie's escape and announce a ransom for him.

Meanwhile, Dharma successfully protects Harika, the hangman's mother, and the magistrate's son. The human rights commission gives a severe charge against Dharma and temporarily suspends him, while the investigation continues. After a few days, Dharma goes to a secret hideout to meet a wounded Muthyammanna and says Charlie actually died earlier after kidnapping Harika. The hangman and magistrate informed him that their family members were also kidnapped. He makes a plan to save them from the evil clutches, so he said that Charlie was alive because of a technical issue in the mission and arranged for a former criminal to act as Charlie. The plan was successful when the people attacked the police.

Dharma tells his previous conversation with Charlie. After knowing Charlie's plans from Saira, Dharma meets Charlie. Charlie told Dharma that nobody could stop him from escaping jail, while also revealing his deal with Pandu to Dharma. Dharma questions Charlie, who says that nobody can cheat him because the diamonds were in a safe, which was located in a secret place and can be opened through his fingerprint.

After Charlie's death, the hangman cuts off Charlie's hand. Dharma finds out the place through Saira, obtains Charlie's diamonds, and secretly sends them to Charlie's stepmother. He reveals the entire story and keeps it a secret. The diamonds will be used for a good purpose, which an NGO is going to launch by Charlie's stepmother. After hearing this, Muthyammanna dies.

Later, with Harika's help, Dharma completes his poetry work; at the same time, he gets a call from his higher officials to rejoin the service as a jailor. Harika asks Dharma what he will name his book, to which Dharma christens "Asura" because his department calls him that, so he named the book as such.

== Cast ==
- Nara Rohit as N. Dharma Teja
- Priya Banerjee as Harika
- Ravi Varma as Chandrashekar "Charlie"
- Madhusudhan Rao as Muthyammanna
- Satyadev as Daya
- Rupa Devi as Charlie's mother
- Ankitha M as Saira, Charlie's girlfriend
- Satya as Kondababu
- Bhanu
- Vennela Rama Rao
- Anukriti Govind Sharma as Surabhi (cameo appearance in the song "Sukumaara")
- Sree Vishnu in a cameo appearance in the song "Sukumaara"
- Shankar Nag as Dilip Kota, Charlie's father in portrait

== Soundtrack ==
The music was composed by Sai Karthik and released by Lahari Music.

Asura

Soundtrack album by Sai Karthik
- Released: May 14, 2015
- Recorded: 2015
- Genre: Soundtrack
- Length: 15:29
- Label: Lahari Music
- Producer: Sai Karthik

Sai Karthik chronology
Pataas (2015)	Asura (2015)	Bham Bolenath (2015)

Track list
No.	Title	Lyrics	Singer(s)	Length
1.	"Potettina Toorupu"	Vasishta Sharma	Sai Karthik, N.C. Karunya	3:25
2.	"Peru Theliyani"	Krishna Kanth	Vedala Hemachandra, Divija Karthik	3:51
3.	"Yuddham Cheyara"	Vasishta Sharma	M. L. R. Karthikeyan	2:50
4.	"Nee Thalape"	Subbaraya Sharma	Saicharan Bhaskaruni	2:22
5.	"Sukumaara"	Krishna Kanth	Sravana Bhargavi, Lokesh	3:01
Total length:				15:29

== Release ==
The Central Board of Film Certification rated the film U/A.

== Critical reception ==
Idlebrain rated Asura 3/5 and called it a different attempt which would be liked by people who like films of different genres. 123 Telugu rated it 3.25/5 and stated, "With Asura, Nara Rohit once again proves his taste for different cinema and brings us a gripping thriller... Asura will be a very unique and interesting experience for all those who like watching intense thrillers".
