= Gully Rowdy =

2021 film by G. Nageswara Reddy

- Release poster
- Directed by: G. Nageswara Reddy
- Screenplay by: G. Nageswara Reddy
- Story by: Bhanu Bogavarapu
- Produced by: Kona Venkat; MVV Satyanarayana
- Starring: Sundeep Kishan; Neha Shetty; Rajendra Prasad; Bobby Simha
- Cinematography: Sujatha Siddharth
- Edited by: Chota K. Prasad
- Music by: Sai Karthik–Ram Miriyala
- Production companies: Kona Film Corporation; MVV Cinemas
- Release date: 17 September 2021
- Country: India
- Language: Telugu

Gully Rowdy is a 2021 Indian Telugu-language romantic action comedy film directed by G. Nageswara Reddy. Produced by Kona Venkat, M. V. V. Satyanarayana under Kona Film Corporation and MVV Cinemas, the film features Sundeep Kishan, Neha Shetty, Rajendra Prasad in primary roles. The music was composed by Sai Karthik–Ram Miriyala. It was released on 17 September 2021.

== Cast ==
- Sundeep Kishan as Vasu
- Neha Shetty as Patapagalu Sahitya
- Rajendra Prasad as Head Constable Patapagalu Venkat Rao
- Bobby Simha as K.Raghu Nayak IPS [CI]
- Mime Gopi as Bairagi Naidu
- Vennela Kishore as Nemali Babu
- Nagineedu as Meesala Simhachalam
- Subbaraju as Aadi
- Posani Krishna Murali as Naidu
- Harsha Chemudu as David Raj
- Sivannarayana as Pappa
- Shakalaka Shankar as Ullipayalu Uma
- Vidyullekha Raman as Forensic Expert Ramba
- Kalpa Latha as Patapagalu Latha
- Sneha Gupta as item number "Changure Item Songree"
- Saurav Chakrabarti as Nanda
- Bevin Reddy as Young Vasu
- Sujatha Simhadri as neighbour
- Prakash Raj as Meesala Appana, Vasu's Father (Portrait)

== Production ==
After collaborating for Tenali Ramakrishna BA. BL, director Nageswara Reddy and actor Sandeep Kishan are working together again, for the film. Sandeep is playing a small-time gangster in the film. The film was officially launched on 16 December 2020 in Vizag, with a pooja ceremony and muhurtam shot done. Principal photography also began on the same day in Vizag. The team filmed for 63 days, as part of its first schedule. Filming took place in Visakhapatnam and Hyderabad. The team wrapped up the filming in June 2021. In an interview to Deccan Chronicle, G. Nageswara Reddy said that "Gully Rowdy is a sitcom on rowdyism", adding: "Although there are action elements, the film is narrated in a comical way. The protagonist is under an obligation to carry on the rowdyism legacy. But he doesn’t like it, so what he does to keep the legacy going and handle his love is hilariously presented".

== Soundtrack ==
Gully Rowdy

Soundtrack album by Sai Karthik and Ram Miriyala
- Released: 2021
- Recorded: 2021
- Genre: Feature film soundtrack
- Length: 14:11
- Language: Telugu
- Label: Mango Music
- Producers: Sai Karthik; Ram Miriyala
External audio
- Audio Jukebox on YouTube

Ram Miriyala chronology
Gully Rowdy (2021)	Pushpaka Vimanam (2021)

Sai Karthik chronology
Tenali Ramakrishna BA. BL (2019)	Gully Rowdy (2021)	Deyyam (2021)

The music was composed by Sai Karthik and Ram Miriyala. All lyrics are written by Bhaskarabhatla. The music was released by Mango Music Company. The first single track "Puttene Prema" corned and composed by Ram Miriyala was released on 7 May 2021. The second track "Changure Item Songree" sung by Mangli and composed by Sai Karthik was released on 22 July 2021.

No.	Title	Music	Singer(s)	Length
1.	"Puttene Prema"	Ram Miriyala	Ram Miriyala	3:47
2.	"Changure Item Songree"	Sai Karthik	Mangli	3:07
3.	"Visakhapatnam lo Rowdy Gaado"	Sai Karthik	Yazin Nizar	2:45
4.	"Addamgaa Bukkaipoyaa"	Sai Karthik	Sai Madhav	1:52
5.	"Thalladilli Podha"	Sai Karthik	Kaala Bhairava
6.	"Theme of Gully Rowdy"	Sai Karthik
Total length:				14:11

== Release ==
Initially, it was reported that the film will be premiered (released) in a direct-to-video mode on a over-the-top media service. Later, Sundeep Kishan confirmed that the film will be released only in the movie theaters. The film was initially scheduled for a theatrical release on 21 May 2021, it was postponed to 3 September 2021. Later, it was again rescheduled to release on 17 September 2021.
