= Kathalo Rajakumari =

- Theatrical release poster
- Directed by: Mahesh Surapaneni
- Screenplay by: Mahesh Surapaneni
- Story by: Mahesh Surapaneni
- Produced by: Soundarya Narra; Prashanthi; Bheeram Sudhakar Reddy; Krishna Vijay
- Starring: Nara Rohit; Namitha Pramod
- Cinematography: Naresh K. Rana
- Edited by: Karthika Srinivas
- Music by: Ilaiyaraaja; Vishal Chandrasekhar
- Production companies: Aarohi Cinema; Aran Media Works; Srihaas Entertainments; Sudhakar Impex (India) Private Limited
- Distributed by: Freeze Frame Films (Overseas)
- Release date: 15 September 2017
- Country: India
- Language: Telugu

Kathalo Rajakumari (transl. Princess in the story) is a 2017 Indian Telugu-language romantic drama film directed by debutant Mahesh Surapaneni and produced by Soundarya Narra, Prashanthi, Bheeram Sudhakar Reddy, and Krishna Vijay. Nara Rohit and Namitha Pramod play the lead roles in the movie. Naga Shourya makes a cameo appearance in this film. it recorded as a flop at box office.

== Plot ==
The movie deals with two film stars: Arjun (Nara Rohit), an arrogant film star famous for playing the antagonist; and Shourya (Naga Shourya), the underdog who does not get enough credit for his hard work. Arjun, who is famous for his villainous streak and attitude, feels he has lost his mean game and decides to become a villain in real life so that he can gain his mean streak back. He chooses his childhood friend Sita (Namitha Pramod) for this purpose and decides to make her his victim. What does he do and what happens next forms the rest of the plot.

== Cast ==
- Nara Rohit as Arjun Chakravarthy
- Namitha Pramod as Sita
- Nanditha Raj as Nanditha
- Prabhas Sreenu as Bheem Sagar alias Secret Star Rathi Sagar
- Surya as Driver Shiva
- Ajay as Arjun's friend
- Rajeev Kanakala as Arjun's father
- Tanikella Bharani as Principal
- Kota Srinivasa Rao as himself
- Srinivas Avasarala as himself
- Chalapathi Rao as himself
- Satya
- Naga Shourya as Shourya (Cameo appearance)

== Soundtrack ==
Kathalo Rajakumari

Soundtrack album by Vishal Chandrasekhar
- Released: 7 July 2017
- Recorded: 2017
- Genre: Feature film soundtrack
- Length: 22:56
- Label: Aran Music
- Producer: Vishal Chandrasekhar; Ilaiyaraaja

Vishal Chandrasekhar chronology
Rangoon (2017)	Kathalo Rajakumari (2017)	Hara Hara Mahadevaki (2017)

Ilaiyaraaja chronology
Clint (2017)	Kathalo Rajakumari (2017)	Kalathur Gramam (2017)

The music was composed by Vishal Chandrasekhar, Ilaiyaraaja and Released by Aran Music.

Track-List
No.	Title	Lyrics	Music	Singer(s)	Length
1.	"Nallani Kanulalo"	Krishna Kanth	Vishal Chandrasekhar	Ashwathi	4:07
2.	"Ye Piduguki"	Krishna Kanth	Vishal Chandrasekhar	Arunraja Kamaraj	3:32
3.	"Naa Kadhalo Yuvarani"	Balaji	Ilaiyaraaja	Vibhavari	5:02
4.	"Thikkalodi Vesham"	Balaji	Ilaiyaraaja	Vibhavari	4:46
5.	"Manase Thalupe"	Krishna Kanth	Vishal Chandrasekhar	Haricharan, Sinduri Vishal	3:33
6.	"Marala Raaa"	Krishna Kanth	Vishal Chandrasekhar	Nithyashree Venkataramanan	1:56
Total length:					22:56

== Reception ==
A critic from 123telugu rated the film two and one-fourth out of five stars and wrote that "Kathalo Rajakumari is yet another disappointing outing from Nara Rohit. Though the first half is okay with some passable moments, the second half completely disappoints the audience with its boring and slow paced narration." A critic from The Times of India rated the film one-and-a-half out of five stars and wrote that "the whole film seems like something only a child could dream up, with trivial incidents leading to catastrophic consequences." A critic from Firstpost wrote that "Nara Rohith, Naga Shourya's film is avoidable at best".
