= Veera Bhoga Vasantha Rayalu =

- Theatrical release poster
- Directed by: R. Inndrasena
- Written by: R. Inndrasena
- Produced by: Apparao Bellana
- Starring: Sree Vishnu; Nara Rohit; Sudheer Babu; Shriya Saran
- Cinematography: S. Venkat; Naveen Yadav
- Edited by: Shashank Mali
- Music by: Mark K. Robin
- Production company: Baba Creations
- Release date: 26 October 2018
- Running time: 125 minutes
- Country: India
- Language: Telugu

Veera Bhoga Vasantha Rayalu is a 2018 Telugu-language vigilante thriller film directed by R. Inndrasena and produced by Appa Rao under Baba Creations banner. The film stars Sree Vishnu, Nara Rohit, Sudheer Babu, and Shriya Saran. The music was composed by Mark K Robin. The film released on 26 October 2018 to negative reviews and was a commercial failure. The film was dubbed into Tamil as "Kannula Thimiru".

== Plot ==
The story opens with Sub-Inspector Vinay Rao (Sudheer Babu) receiving a complaint from a young boy (Master Charith Manas) who claims that his house, along with his parents inside, has gone missing. The claim is validated when Vinay finds that house no. 143 in the colony, the boy’s house, is missing. Dr. Surya (Ravi Prakash) is a medical practitioner who sponsors an orphanage in the city. A girl from the orphanage goes missing, but Circle Inspector Srinivasa Rao (Anantha Prabhu) does not take the case seriously and rebukes Surya. A passenger flight from Colombo to India goes missing, and Deepak Reddy (Nara Rohith) is appointed as the head of the Investigation Unit.

Constable Ramarao (Shashank), a part-time private investigator, offers to help Surya find the missing girl, but this results in the latter getting threatening calls from the kidnapper. Deepak receives a call from a man, identifying himself as Veera Bhoga Vasantha Rayalu (Sree Vishnu), who claims to have hijacked the missing flight and asks for Inspector Neelima (Shriya Saran). Neelima reveals that there have been killings of criminals in the recent past that were linked to a man who identified himself by the same name. Veera Bhoga Vasantha Rayalu demands that in exchange for the release of the 300 hostages, Deepak and his team execute a Pan-India mission of simultaneously killing 300 criminals. The government accepts the demand and arrangements for the operation are made. Vinay’s constables discover a key that opens the lock to an old dilapidated house, and the team plans to break into the house, where they believe the kidnappers of the young boy’s parents are. Ramarao discovers a racket of kidnapping poor and orphaned young girls, and follows the kidnappers while they are kidnapping another girl, but is discovered and taken to Surya’s house, where Ramarao, Surya and the latter’s wife are killed by the kidnappers. Deepak discovers that Veera Bhoga Vasantha Rayalu’s claims of hijacking the flight were false after the flight’s remains are found in the Indian Ocean, implying that the plane had crashed. Vinay and his team rescue the kidnapped girls, find the head of the kidnappers, and shoot him dead.

Deepak and his team are forced to go ahead with the operation after realising Veera Bhoga Vasantha Rayalu has another set of 300 individuals as hostages. Meanwhile, a man dressed as Santa Claus murders the girls whom Vinay and his team had rescued. Surya’s orphaned son, Nikhil (Master Snehith), who was admitted at the orphanage, runs away and dresses up as a girl, hoping to discover the kidnappers, and is successfully taken away. Vinay discovers that his father has committed suicide. Veera Bhoga Vasantha Rayalu, instead of releasing the hostages, sets them ablaze, who are later revealed to also have been criminals. The team manages to find a sketch of his appearance, and traces his location. Meanwhile, Vinay realises that the house has not gone missing, but rather the number plates outside all the houses have been changed to make it look like the boy’s house was missing. The corpses of the boy’s parents are also discovered. Nikhil escapes from his kidnappers after being discovered. Vinay discovers that the young boy was the one responsible for the murder of his parents, the forging of the missing house, as well as the suicide of his father.

It is revealed at this juncture that the story takes place in three different timelines; Veera Bhoga Vasantha Rayalu, Nikhil and the boy are all revealed to be the same person. It is revealed that Vinay’s father, the negligent Srinivasa Rao, was the head of the kidnappers’ racket that killed Surya. Years later, the kidnappers themselves adopted Nikhil from the orphanage, not realising who he was, and were killed by him, which brought Nikhil to Vinay, and he blackmailed Vinay’s father into suicide.

In the present, Deepak, Neelima and an older Vinay corner Nikhil / Veera Bhoga Vasantha Rayalu into a dilapidated building, but the latter successfully escapes from there. An epilogue shows a much older Nikhil and hints at a sequel.

== Cast ==
- Sree Vishnu as Nikhil / Veera Bhoga Vasantha Rayalu
  - Master Charith Manas as 15-year-old Nikhil
  - Master Snehith as young Nikhil
- Nara Rohit as Deepak Reddy
- Sudheer Babu as SI, later DSP, Vinay Rao
- Shriya Saran as Inspector Neelima
- Ravi Prakash as Dr. Surya, Nikhil's father
- Shashank as Constable Ramarao, also part time Private Investigator
- Srinivasa Reddy as Constable 403
- Manoj Nandam as Udhav
- Rajeswari as Dr. Surya’s wife, Nikhil's mother
- Edida Sriram
- Anantha Prabhu as Circle Inspector Srinivasa Rao, Vinay's father
- Giridhar as Investigation Unit Officer
- Naveen Neni as Constable 401
- Shashidar
- Prasanth Karthi

== Promotion ==
The first look poster was released on 11 July 2018.

== Soundtrack ==
Veera Bhoga Vasantha Rayalu

Soundtrack album by Mark K Robin
- Released: 24 October 2018
- Recorded: 2018
- Genre: Soundtrack
- Length: 6:17
- Label: Mango Music
- Producer: Mark K Robin

Mark K Robin chronology
Awe (2018)	Veera Bhoga Vasantha Rayalu (2018)	Suryakantham (2019)

The soundtrack was composed by Mark K Robin and released by Mango Music.

Track list
No.	Title	Lyrics	Singer(s)	Length
1.	"The World is Dying"	Kenny Edward	Manisha Eerabathini	3:33
2.	"Veera Bhoga Vasantha Rayalu (Title Song)"	Vivek Hariharan	Anurag Kulkarni	2:44
Total length:				6:17

== Reception ==
=== Critical reception ===
The Times of India gave 2 out of 5 stars stating, "Veera Bhoga Vasantha Rayalu is a film that tries to take on too much at once and fails at it". IndiaGlitz gave 2 out of 5 stars writing, "A multi-thread thriller gone wrong. A misplaced narrative style and wrong kind of performances".
