= Partners (2024 film) =

South Indian movie

- Theatrical release poster
- Directed by: Naveen John
- Written by: Naveen John; Hariprasad; Prasanth K. V.
- Produced by: Dinesh Kollappally
- Starring: Dhyan Sreenivasan; Kalabhavan Shajon; Satna Titus
- Cinematography: Faisal Ali
- Edited by: Sunil S. Pillai
- Music by: Prakash Alex
- Production company: Kollappally Films
- Release date: 5 July 2024
- Country: India
- Language: Malayalam

Partners is a 2024 Indian Malayalam-language film co-written and directed by Naveen John. It stars Dhyan Sreenivasan, Kalabhavan Shajon and Satna Titus. The film's cinematography and editing were handled by Faisal Ali and Sunil S Pillai, respectively. The film's soundtrack was composed by Prakash Alex.

The film received mixed to negative reviews from the critics upon release, and it was a box-office failure.

== Cast ==
- Dhyan Sreenivasan as Vishnu
- Madhusudhan Rao as Raghvendra Bhatt
- Sanju Sivram as Krishna Kumar
- Kalabhavan Shajohn as Income Tax Asst. Commissioner Parthasarathy
- Rony David Raj as Vijay
- Prasanth Alexander as Devarajan
- Satna Titus as Padma
- Srikant Murali as Shanavas
- Aneesh Gopal as Rahim
- Rajesh Sharma as Shenoy
- Hareesh Peradi as Moosa
- Chithra Nair as Priya Bhatt
- Neeraja Das as Azhagi Krishnakumar
- Devaki Rajendran as Lakshmi
- Dinesh Kollappally as Chacko
- Rahul Rajagopal as Sajeevan
- Disney James as Raghavan
- Vaishnavi Raj as Sathi

== Music ==
The music was composed by Prakash Alex.

== Release ==
The film was originally scheduled for release on 28 June 2024, but was delayed. It subsequently released theatrically on 5 July 2024.
