= Thittam Poattu Thirudura Kootam =

2019 Tamil heist film by Sudhar

- Theatrical release poster
- Directed by: Sudhar
- Written by: Sudhar
- Produced by: Raghunathan. P.S.
- Starring: Chandran; Satna Titus; Parthiban; Chaams; Daniel Annie Pope
- Cinematography: Martin Joe
- Edited by: Venkat Ramanan. K.J.
- Music by: Ashwath (music director)
- Production company: Two Movie Buffs
- Distributed by: SDC Picturez
- Release date: 27 September 2019
- Running time: 117 minutes
- Country: India
- Language: Tamil

Thittam Poattu Thirudura Kootam (transl. The group that plans and loots) is a 2019 Indian Tamil-language heist comedy thriller film directed by Sudhar and produced by Raghunathan. P.S. The film stars Parthiban, Chandran and Satna Titus in the lead roles. The cinematography was handled by Martin Joe, while the music was scored by Ashwath. Remain took care of the art direction while Billa Jagan took care of the stunts. Executive Producer for the film is Sriram. K.B. The film was co-produced by Chandrasekar. R. The principal photography began in June 2016, and was wrapped up in October 2016.

The film follows story of a group who think of stealing a cricket world cup. The film was released on 27 September 2019.

== Plot ==
After carrying out small thefts, Sethu (R. Parthiban), Shiva (Chandran), Anjali (Satna Titus), Gaja (Daniel Annie Pope) and Padmanabhan (Chaams) decide to ‘lift the World Cup’.

== Cast ==
- R. Parthiban as Sethu
- Chandran as Shiva
- Satna Titus as Anjali
- Chaams as Padmanaban (Buddy)
- Daniel Annie Pope as 'Kambi' Gajaa
- Arjai as George Britto
- Sahana Shetty as Radhika
- Saivam Ravi
- Ayub Khan

== Production ==
The crew began its principal photography in July 2016, with Sudhar, an independent filmmaker who was a contestant in Kalaingar TV Naalaya Iyakkunar Season 5 reality show. Radhakrishnan Parthiban was signed on to play Chandran's paternal uncle in the film, who leads a criminal gang involving his nephew and the characters portrayed by Satna, Chaams and Daniel. The film shoot was wrapped up in 37 days.

== Soundtrack ==
Thittam Poattu Thirudura Kootam

Soundtrack album by Ashwath
- Released: 15 November 2017
- Recorded: 2017
- Genre: Feature film soundtrack
- Length: 19:40
- Language: Tamil
- Label: Lahari Music

Ashwath chronology
Nalanum Nandhiniyum (2014)	Thittam Poattu Thirudura Kootam (2019)	FIR (2022)
External audio
- Audio Jukebox on YouTube

The music of this album is composed by Ashwath and lyrics by Sudhar, Niranjan Bharathi and Muralidaran K N.

Track list
No.	Title	Lyrics	Singer(s)	Length
1.	"Thittam Poattu Thirudura Kootam – Title Track"	Sudhar	Deepak, Aparna Narayanan, Divya Prasad, Lil Phil (Rap)	4:38
2.	"Marmamaai"	Niranjan Bharathi	Balram Iyer & Shashaa Tirupati	5:02
3.	"Thaakkura"	Muralidaran K N	Naresh Iyer, Divya Prasad	4:39
4.	"TPTK Mishmash – Theme"	Barath	Babu, woodwinds – Vijaygopal	1:16
5.	"Run Outtu.. Hit Outtu.."	Muralidaran K N	Venkat Prabhu & Premji Amaren	4:05
Total length:				19:40

== Reception ==
Thinkal Menon of The Times of India rated the film 2/5 stars and wrote, "The plot looks good on paper, but the execution falters, with the script lacking logic and believability factor".
