= Rowdy Fellow =

2014 film written and directed by Krishna Chaitanya

- Theatrical Release Poster
- Directed by: Krishna Chaitanya
- Produced by: T. Prakash Reddy
- Starring: Nara Rohit; Vishakha Singh
- Cinematography: Aravindan P. Gandhi
- Edited by: Karthika Srinivas
- Music by: Sunny M.R.
- Production companies: Moviemills & Cinema5
- Release date: 21 November 2014
- Country: India
- Language: Telugu

Rowdy Fellow is a 2014 Indian Telugu-language political action comedy film, written and directed by Krishna Chaitanya and produced by T. Prakash Reddy under his banner Moviemills, and presented by Cinema 5. This hybrid genre film stars Nara Rohit and Vishakha Singh in the lead roles, while Rao Ramesh, Paruchuri Venkateswara Rao, Posani Krishna Murali, Supreeth, Praveen, Ahuti Prasad, and Madhunandan, among others, play supporting roles. Sunny has composed music for the film. The film was later dubbed into Hindi as Mard The Khiladi and released by Aditya Movies in 2018.

== Plot ==
Rana Prathap Jayadev is rich and egotistical. Once he was disturbed by a political rally who was organizing by MP Asuragana Durga Prasad's henchmen. He then quarrels with them. This issue then leads to the police station in the dealing. The SP demands that Rana should apologise to the henchmen, but Rana did not oblige. Rana then argues with the police, but when SP grabs his collar he gets angry towards the SP and apologizes to the henchmen, and warns SP that he would be hearing about him soon.

After that, Rana decides to become a police officer to take revenge on the SP. He then uses high influence and huge money as a bribe to a minister. He becomes a Sub-Inspector to a rural area. He focuses on the law and order, settles the disputes in his own style, and becomes a headache to SP. Rana befriends Constable Reddy, who becomes a trusted aid to him. He soon falls in love with the SP's daughter Megha, and after comical encounters, she also falls for him.

Afterwards, Rana takes up the head constable's missing case. On the enquiry, he learns that he was missing since his joining date in the department. While investigating, he learns that with the help of the CI, Prasad's henchmen were involved in this case for a lockup death issue. Rana then finds out the sole witness: the colleague of the constable. The colleague confesses that the CI killed the person in the police station and blackmails them to bribe him for a ransom. The colleague ran away from the village, and as the constable could not fight for his ethics, he kills himself. The CI then tries to hide his body, but it was founded by Rana. Rana tries to arrest the CI, but while in a chase, the CI met with an ambulance accident and died.

From that day onwards, Rana intervenes in all of Prasad's activities and understands the corruption in the police system. With the help of his father, he gives more salaries to his lower police and orders them to work honestly and sincerely. He also comprises with SP and with his acceptance Megha and Rana get married. Rana continues targeting Prasad, during one fight he kills Prasad's brother. Then, Prasad attacks Rana, but while in the fight, he is backstabbed by Reddy and is injured. Rana was then rescued by his father's appointed private securities, led by Rana's other trusted aid: his private security guard James. Prasad then learns that Rana was alive and then he arranges a meeting to compromise with him through Reddy. In the meeting, they both quarrel, and finally, Rana shoots Prasad to death. Finally, the film ends with Rana forgiving Reddy for his actions and joining with him.

== Cast ==
- Nara Rohit as Rana Prathap Jayadev
- Vishakha Singh as Megha
- Rao Ramesh as Asuragana Durga Prasad
- Paruchuri Venkateswara Rao as Head Constable
- Giri Babu as High Court Judge
- Posani Krishna Murali as Silk Babu
- Supreeth as Titla
- Praveen as Constable Reddy
- Ahuti Prasad as Megha's father and ACP
- Madhunandan as Bobby
- Gollapudi Maruti Rao
- Prudhviraj
- Talluri Rameshwari
- Ajay as Ajay
- Satya as Gavaskar
- Lal

== Filming ==
The principal photography was shot in various locations of India, including Telangana, Andhra Pradesh and Goa.

Rowdy Fellow also features an unused number by the late music director Anil Reddy who is remembered for his music in films like 'Sambhavami Yuge Yuge', 'Gamyam', 'LBW', 'Kalavar King' etc. This enchanting melody song was shot in the beautiful locales of Virginia, Washington DC and Maryland of the United States, but was later removed from the movie for reasons unknown. The team launched the promotion of the film with a digital poster on 25 May, to commemorate the late music director's birthday.

== Soundtrack ==
The film's music released on 16 September 2014 to enthusiastic reviews on the web. Honourable Chief Minister of Andhra Pradesh, Shri Nara Chandra Babu Naidu, blessed the unit members on the eve of the event. Thereafter, the album topped Telugu music charts for weeks to follow.

Rowdy Fellow

Soundtrack album by Sunny M.R.
- Released: 16 September 2014
- Recorded: 2014
- Genre: Soundtrack
- Length: 20:01
- Label: Saregama
- Producer: Sunny M.R.

Sunny M.R. chronology
Uyyala Jampala (2013)	Rowdy Fellow (2014)	Dohchay (2015)

No.	Title	Lyrics	Singer(s)	Length
1.	"Ra Ra Rowdy – Gaana Veera Soora"	Krishna Chaitanya	Arijit Singh, Aditi Singh Sharma	3:27
2.	"Yedo"	Krishna Chaitanya	Armaan Malik, Harshika Gudi	3:57
3.	"Aa Seetadevi Navvula"	Krishna Chaitanya	Arijit Singh	4:16
4.	"Yentha Vaaru Gaani – Remix"	C. Narayana Reddy	Nakash Aziz, Natasha Pinto	3:07
5.	"Red & Yellow"	Vasishta Sharma	Shalmali Kholgade, Samrat Kaushal	3:05
6.	"Call of the Rowdy – Theme Music" (Instrumental)		Jennifer Abraham, Sunny M.R.	2:09
Total length:				20:01

== Release ==
The movie was given 'U/A' certificate. and the film released on 21 November 2014.

== Critical reception ==
The film received positive reviews from critics. 123telugu wrote Nara Rohit requires to work more on his expressions to evolve as an actor and just an ok to watch and rated the film 3 out of 5. idlebrain.com gave 3 out of 5 and said Rowdy Fellow is an attempt narrate a story of an egoist turning into good Samaritan by doing selfless help to the people in a village. HOURDOSE stated "Overall ‘Rowdy Fellow’ is a good one-time watch commercial film with some decent performances by the cast, good music, nice dialogues and some stylish visuals."

== Awards and nominations ==
S.no	Year	Ceremony	Category	Nominee	Result
1	2015	62nd Filmfare Awards South	Best Lyricist	Krishna Chaitanya	Nominated
