= Samajavaragamana (film) =

2023 Indian Telugu-language film

- Release poster
- Directed by: Ram Abbaraju
- Screenplay by: Ram Abbaraju
- Dialogues by: Nandu Savirigana
- Story by: Bhanu Bogavarapu
- Produced by: Razesh Danda; Anil Sunkara (presenter)
- Starring: Sree Vishnu; Reba Monica John
- Cinematography: Raam Reddy
- Edited by: Chota K. Prasad
- Music by: Gopi Sundar
- Production companies: AK Entertainments; Hasya Movies
- Release date: 29 June 2023
- Running time: 140 minutes
- Country: India
- Language: Telugu
- Box office: est. ₹50 crore

Samajavaragamana is a 2023 South Indian Telugu-language comedy drama film directed by Ram Abbaraju from a story written by Bhanu Bogavarapu. It is produced by Razesh Danda under the banners, Ak Entertainments and Hasya Movies. It stars Sree Vishnu, Reba Monica John, Naresh, Srikanth Iyyengar, Vennela Kishore, Sudarshan, and Devi Prasad.

It was released on 29 June 2023 to highly positive reviews from the critics and audience praising the cast's performances. The film was a commercial success at the box office.

== Plot ==
Bala Subramanyam "Balu" is a responsible middle-class son who works as a ticketing clerk at a multiplex in Hyderabad, Telangana. He is the sole breadwinner of his loving family and despises romantic love. His father, Uma Maheshwara Rao, has been attempting to earn his bachelor's degree, to get his ancestral property but to no avail.

According to his grandfather's will, they will inherit a huge amount of money contingent upon his father's graduation. Through his father, Balu meets Sarayu, who is also poor in studies and is attempting to pass her supplementary exams. She eventually becomes a paying guest in Balu's home. Balu takes up the responsibility of tutoring his father and Sarayu in a sequence of funny events.

Soon, Balu and Sarayu fall in love. Sarayu clears her degree and returns to her hometown. A problem arises for the couple when Balu and Sarayu go to an engagement. What is the problem? How do they get out of it? These questions form the plot.

== Cast ==
- Sree Vishnu as Bala Subramanyam "Balu"
- Reba Monica John as Sarayu
- Naresh as Uma Maheshwara Rao, Balu's father
- Pramodini as Balu’s mother
- Keyuri as Vaishnavi "Vyshu"
- Sudharshan as Box Office Baadshah, Balu’s friend
- Srikanth Iyyengar as Rama Krishna
- Vennela Kishore as Kula Sekhar, Sarayu’s cousin
- Raghu Babu as Bala Saraswathi, tuition teacher
- Rajeev Kanakala as Sarayu's biological father
- Priya as Maheshwari
- Goparaju Vijay as Prabhakar
- Keshav Deepak as Balu’s uncle
- Tenali Shakuntala as Balu’s grandmother
- Devi Prasad as Murali Krishna
- Meena Vasu as Meena
- Subhash as Jaya Krishna
- Satya Krishnan as Jaya Krishna’s wife
- Gemini Suresh as Chinni Krishna
- Kashvi as Sindhu
- Kaushik Rachapudi as Madhunandan
- Gayatri Bhargavi as Prabhavati
- Goparaju Ramana as Marriage Registrar Clerk

== Soundtrack ==
The film score and soundtrack album are composed by Gopi Sunder. The first single titled "What To Do" was released on April 21, 2023. The second single titled "Humsafar" was released on June 15, 2023. The third single titled "Hola Re Hola" was released on June 21, 2023.

Samajavaragamana

Soundtrack album by Gopi Sundar
- Released: 2023
- Recorded: 2023
- Genre: Feature film soundtrack
- Length: 17:32
- Language: Telugu
- Label: Aditya Music
- Producer: Gopi Sunder

| No. | Title | Lyrics | Music | Singer(s) | Length |
|---|---|---|---|---|---|
| 1. | "Choti Choti" | Shree Mani | Gopi Sundar | S. P. Charan | 4:07 |
| 2. | "Humsafar" | Krishna Kanth | Gopi Sundar | Shakthisree Gopalan | 4:12 |
| 3. | "Hola Re Hola" | Shree Mani | Gopi Sundar | J.V Sudhanshu & Sony komanduri | 4:57 |
| 4. | "What to do" | Shree Mani | Gopi Sundar | Jassie Gift | 4:16 |
| Total length: | | | | | 17:32 |

External audio
- Samajavaragamana - Full Songs Jukebox on YouTube

== Release ==
The film was set to release on May 18, 2023, but was delayed due to post-production works in progress. It was finally released on June 29, 2023. The digital rights of the film were acquired by Aha. It streamed on Aha on July 28, 2023. The film clocked 100 million streaming minutes in 24 hrs.

== Critical reception ==
Samajavaragamana received positive reviews from critics.

Abhilasha Cherukuri of Cinema Express gave 3.5 out of 5 stars and wrote "Samajavaragamana’s writing really makes one wonder. It is consistent with its comedy while managing to deliver its intended message effectively.

Paul Nicodemus of The Times of India gave 3 out of 5 stars and wrote "Samajavaragamana is a recommended watch for those seeking an entertaining cinematic experience that will leave you with a smile on your face".
