= Baanam =

- Movie Poster
- Directed by: Chaitanya Dantuluri
- Written by: Chaitanya Dantuluri; Nagaraju Gandham
- Produced by: Priyanka Dutt
- Starring: Nara Rohit; Vedhika; Sayaji Shinde; Rajeev Kanakala
- Cinematography: Anil Bhandari
- Edited by: Marthand K. Venkatesh
- Music by: Mani Sharma
- Distributed by: Three Angels Studio Pvt Ltd
- Release date: 16 September 2009
- Running time: 110 minutes
- Country: India
- Language: Telugu

Baanam (transl. Arrow) is a 2009 Indian Telugu-language action drama film directed by the debutant Chaitanya Dantuluri, starring Nara Rohit and Vedhika in the lead roles. Produced by Priyanka Dutt under the banner Three Angels Studio Pvt Ltd, the film also marks Nara Rohith's debut as lead actor.

Baanam was released theatrically on 16 September 2009. The film was a moderate box office success but received positive reviews from critics. It was also dubbed in Hindi-language under the title Jeo Aur Jeeno Do (transl. Live and let live).

== Plot ==
The story is set in the town of Ranasthali, in the year 1989. Bhagat Panigrahi is preparing to become an IPS officer. His father, Chandrasekhar Panigrahi, a former Naxalite, returns after 20 years before giving up his fight for society because of his retirement. According to his ideology, at a certain time, every person wants to retire from their work. He became the first person who retired in naxalism. He comes back home and questions his son's ambition of becoming an IPS because his wife was killed by a policeman. Bhagath convinces him with his point of logic and gets the acceptance from his father. Meanwhile, a local don, Shakti Patnaik, is slowly building his empire, terrorizing police and anyone who opposes him.

One day, Bhagat meets Subbalakshmi, a naive married Brahmin girl at a railway station; she was abandoned by her in-laws because of insufficient dowry. Unable to pay the dowry, her father gets a heart stroke and dies, unknown to her. After hearing her father's death through Bhagath, her in-laws abandoned her for not getting the dowry. Then, there is no option left. Bhagath takes Subbalakshmi to her hometown and reveals her father's death. After observing her poor financial situation, he encouraged her to become independent. Then, with the help of Bhagath, she resumed her education to become an independent woman.

One day, her husband sends a message to her for a secret meeting, and then Bhagath comes with her to meet him; in that meeting, she ends her relationship with her husband. Then on the urge of taking revenge on her, her ex-husband takes the help of the dreaded gangster, Shakthi Patnaik, to abduct her, which triggers a series of events between Bhagat and Shakthi. After that, Bhagath proposes to Subbalakshmi for marriage, she eventually accepts. Meanwhile, Bhagath manages to qualify in UPSC and is selected for training in the middle of the route. Shakthi and his gang interrupt him and severely injure him. Then, Angered Sr.panigrahi tries to kill Shakthi, but the attempt is missed and caught by Shakthi, and then he kills him brutally. After knowing the facts, Bhagath decides to destroy Shakthi. He meets a senior IPS officer who once inspired Bhagath to become an IPS officer in his childhood by asking trainees to stand up for the fight against the tyranny of Shakthi. Earlier, he refused, and later, he accepted. Then, the gang attacks the gang members of Shakthi and his businesses with solid evidence. Then Shakthi tries to run away to Hyderabad. Bhagath and his gang came to arrest Shakthi along with the police then Bhagath catches Shakthi, and a fight ensues between them in the fight, Bhagath kills Shakthi

After that, the trainees got their postings, and Bhagath is ready to go for his training in the police academy. The film ends with the line "a new chapter begins."

== Cast ==
- Nara Rohit as Bhagath Panigrahi, Subbalakshmi's love interest
- Vedhika as Subbalakshmi
- Sayaji Shinde as Chandrasekhar Panigrahi, Bhagath's father
- Randhir Gattla as Shakthi Patnaik
- Rajeev Kanakala as ACP Gudipudi Venkateswara Rao
- Sree Vishnu as an academy officer
- Bhanu Chander as an IPS officer who inspires Bhagath to become an IPS officer
- AVS as "Sangeetha" Srigiriraju, Bhagath's neighbour and his house owner
- Giri as Vedamurthy,Subbalakshmi's ex-husband
- Sivannarayana Naripeddi as Vedamurthy's father
- Ragini as Vedamurthy's mother
- Charandeep as a henchman
- Temper Vamsi as a henchman

== Soundtrack ==
Baanam

Soundtrack album by Mani Sharma
- Released: 24 August 2009
- Recorded: 2009
- Genre: Feature film soundtrack
- Length: 23:06
- Language: Telugu
- Label: Sony Music
- Producer: Mani Sharma

Mani Sharma chronology
Rechipo (2009)	Baanam (2009)	Billa (2009)

The music for the film has been composed by Mani Sharma. The audio was launched on 24 August 2009.

Track-List
No.	Title	Lyrics	Singer(s)	Length
1.	"Kadhile Paadham"	Vanamali	Shankar Mahadevan	5:09
2.	"Naalo Nenena"	Ramajogayya Sastry	Hemachandra, Saindhavi	5:49
3.	"Padhara Padhara"	Ramajogayya Sastry	Ranjith, Naveen Madhav	3:38
4.	"Mogindhi Je Ganta"	Ramajogayya Sastry	Shreya Ghoshal	4:46
5.	"Baanam Theme Music"	Krishna Chaitanya	Ranjith, Naveen Madhav ,Rahul Nambiar, Hanumantha Rao	3:34
Total length:				23:06

== Critical reception ==
A critic from Rediff.com wrote that "Baanam, sans the formulaic pattern, makes for a decent watch and such films have to be encouraged by the audience". A critic from The Times of India wrote that "Debutant director Chaitanya deserves kudos for dishing out an intense cop film to give [sic] Tollywood's latest debutants a clear edge over the rest". Idlebrain.com review said - Nara Rohit delivers what is needed for the character. Vedhika did the role of a traditional Brahmin girl and she is apt.

== Box office ==
The film was a moderate success at the box office.

== Awards and nominations ==
The film won the Nandi Award for Second Best Feature Film won by Seshu Priyanka Chalasani (2009). Chaitanya Dantuluri was nominated for Filmfare Best Director Award (Telugu).
