= Needi Naadi Oke Katha =

- Theatrical release poster
- Directed by: Venu Udugula
- Screenplay by: Venu Udugula
- Produced by: Krishna Vijay; Prashanthi
- Starring: Sree Vishnu; Satna Titus
- Cinematography: Raj Thota
- Edited by: Bonthala Nageswara Reddy
- Music by: Suresh Bobbili
- Production company: Aran Media Works
- Release date: 23 March 2018
- Country: India
- Language: Telugu
- Budget: ₹2.25 crore
- Box office: est. ₹12.3 crore

Needi Naadi Oke Katha (transl. You and I share the same story) is a 2018 Indian Telugu-language satirical social problem film written and directed by Venu Udugula (in his directorial debut) and produced by Krishna Vijay, Atluri Narayana Rao, and Prashanti, under Aran Media Works. It stars Sree Vishnu and Satna Titus while Posani Krishna Murali and Devi Prasad appear in supporting roles.

== Plot ==
The story is about Rudra Raju Sagar (Sree Vishnu) from Chittoor a middle class youth who is failing his degree continuously. It feels sad to his father (Devi Prasad) who is a teacher. Sagar's sister does well in studies, but he tried to pass but he couldn't, after a critical circumstance he decides to take his studies seriously for his fathers sake and aims to become what his father wants. So for taking guidance in studies he meets Dharmika (Satna Titus) a topper through his sister. At first, she avoids him thinking he is a flirt, later understanding his intention, starts giving him guidance to prepare for the exams. She prepares a time table for him and suggests that he read self-confidence books. Then Sagar changes his lifestyle, which gets condemned by every one. He leaves his friends for the sake of his father. Dharmika introduces Anand Ram Shankar (Posani Krishna Murali) a famous motivator, after some comical circumstances Sagar understands that his sessions are completely fake.

Later, Dharmika realises she loves Sagar and proposes to him, but Sagar refuses her proposal because he is a complete failure. Then Dharmika tells him that she was also a failure because she lived in a false image as a topper. She does not know what she wants since in her childhood her parents decided her career after getting good marks in studies, all teachers and students treated her special, which leads her to follow a fake image. She realises that her story is similar to Sagar, which is the exact opposite pole to him after she meets Sagar. Then she tells him that everyone has a unique talent which they don't recognize because of the foolish educational system which created a rat race. Then Sagar realises that he is not made for a rat race and he cannot fit into this educational system. Then Sagar accepts her proposal, later both bunk their semester exams and go to Ooty without their parents knowledge. After coming back, their family members question them for not attending the exams, then Dharmika manages from her sister, but Sagar tries to convince his father to discontinue his studies and decides to start for his living but his father didn't accept his plans and argues with him, later he meets a philanthropist (Nara Rohith) with his conversation he understands that people are addicted to false prestige due to the rat race.

After a critical circumstance Sagar's father tells him that he is ashamed to be his father. Then Sagar understands that his father was also addicted to the false prestige and leaves home. Later Sagar and Dharmika go to Hyderabad and start their own living without their parents will.

Some days later, Sagar working as a cab driver accidentally meets his father in a pickup point. Then Sagar convinces his father that he is very happy as the way he is which he was working without any pressure and he says that he may be poor in his academics but he is not a dumb in the study of life. One day he will become successful in life and make him proud. Finally the film ends with his father allowing Sagar and his wife Dharmika into his family.

== Cast ==
- Sree Vishnu as Rudraraju Sagar
- Devi Prasad as Sagar's father
- Satna Titus as Dharmika
- Posani Krishna Murali as Anand Ram Shankar
- Rupa Lakshmi as Sagar's mother
- Swethlana
- Nara Rohit as a philanthropist in a cameo appearance

== Soundtrack ==
Needi Naadi Oke Katha

Soundtrack album by Suresh Bobbili
- Released: 2018
- Recorded: 2018
- Genre: Feature film soundtrack
- Length: 24:17
- Label: Mango Music
- Producer: Suresh Bobbili

Suresh Bobbili chronology
Maa Abbayi (2017)	Needi Naadi Oke Katha (2018)	Nuvvu Thopuraa (2019)
External audio
- Audio Jukebox on YouTube

The soundtrack was composed by Suresh Bobbili and released by Mango Music.

Track list
No.	Title	Lyrics	Singer(s)	Length
1.	"Parvathi Thanayudavo"	Kandikonda	Suresh Bobbili, Shankar Babu, Sathyavathi (Mangli), Ranjani Sivakumar Siddareddy, Naresh	4:07
2.	"Deham Ichina Daivama"	Srinivas Jilukara, Maharaj	Naveen Iyer	6:00
3.	"Endi Raa Ee Janala Gola"	Kasarla Shyam	Suresh Bobbili, Sathyavathi (Mangli), Kailash	4:08
4.	"Edo Jarige"	Kandikonda	Chinmayi	4:55
5.	"Needi Naadi Okke Katha"	Matla Thirupathi	Sree Kavya, Suresh Bobbili	1:40
6.	"Naaloni Nuvvu Neeloni Nenu"	Srinivas Jilukara	Sony, Naani	3:27
Total length:				24:17

== Release ==
Needi Naadi Oke Katha was released worldwide on 23 March 2018.

== Critical reception ==
Critics praised the film for its realistic narration. Times of India gave 3.5/5 rating and considered that "the film is refreshingly natural in its emotions and deserves to be seen." The Hindu praised the film for its performances and direction.
