= Appatlo Okadundevadu =

2016 Telugu action crime film

- Theatrical release poster
- Directed by: Saagar K. Chandra
- Written by: Saagar K. Chandra
- Produced by: Prashanti; Krishna Vijay
- Starring: Nara Rohit; Sree Vishnu; Tanya Hope; Sasha Singh
- Cinematography: Naveen Yadav
- Edited by: Kotagiri Venkateswara Rao
- Music by: Sai Karthik
- Production company: Aran Media Works
- Release date: 30 December 2016
- Running time: 125 minutes
- Country: India
- Language: Telugu

Appatlo Okadundevadu (transl. Once upon a time, there was a man) is a 2016 Indian Telugu-language action thriller film written and directed by Saagar K Chandra and produced by Aran Media Works. The film stars Nara Rohit, Sree Vishnu, and debutantes Tanya Hope and Sasha Singh, while Brahmaji plays supporting role. The music was composed by Sai Karthik with cinematography by Naveen Yadav and editing by Kotagiri Venkateswara Rao. The film released on 30 December 2016.

The plot follows the life of Railway Raju (Vishnu), an aspiring cricketer who is falsely framed as a Naxalite.

== Plot ==
Journalist Rhea travels to Hyderabad to write an article about "Railway" Raju, a former top cricket player who later becomes a gangster. She first visits Solomon, Raju's friend, who is now in prison. Solomon narrates Raju's story to her.

In the 1990s, Raju is a leading cricketer in Hyderabad and a hopeful candidate for the Indian national team. One day, he is arrested by the police. Inspector Imtiaz Ali, who is investigating several cases involving an active Naxalite group in Hyderabad, informs Raju that his sister Ahalya is now a member of the group. Raju denies any knowledge of the matter, explaining that Ahalya ran away from home five years earlier and has had no contact with the family since. Although Imtiaz intends to keep Raju in custody, his superior releases him after becoming convinced that Raju is not involved.

Just as Raju is about to be selected for the national team, the police intervene and his nomination is cancelled. They argue that having a family member of a Naxalite represent the country on the international stage would be inappropriate. Raju seeks help from his coach, who is unable to resolve the matter himself and instead refers him to a powerful politician. While preparing to board a train to meet the politician, Raju learns that gangster Baghwan Das, to whom his family owes money, has kidnapped his girlfriend Nitya and is demanding immediate repayment. Raju goes to Baghwan Das and begs for mercy, but one of the gangsters attempts to molest Nitya in front of him. Enraged, Raju fights the gang and kills Baghwan Das before escaping with Nitya.

Before Solomon can continue, the jailer interrupts the interview and forbids him from meeting visitors. Rhea then turns to Vittal Seth, another friend of Raju, who continues the story.

Raju is soon arrested for Baghwan Das' murder. While he is in police custody, Ahalya and the rest of her group are killed in a police operation. Unable to bear the collapse of her family within a matter of days, Raju's mother commits suicide. Later, a minister who had been an enemy of Baghwan Das arranges Raju's release on bail and offers him work. Devastated by the loss of his family and seeing no other path forward, Raju accepts. He becomes the minister's henchman and carries out numerous illegal activities on his behalf. He later marries Nitya. Over time, Raju's criminal network expands and he eventually becomes the most powerful crime boss in Hyderabad.

Raju's activities soon attract police attention. Imtiaz is assigned to the case and systematically dismantles Raju's empire by raiding his illegal operations. Realizing that his downfall is inevitable, Raju decides to retire from crime and flee the city. However, while on his way to meet Nitya at the railway station, he is intercepted by Imtiaz, who shoots him. As Nitya waits for him at the station, she learns of his death through a news report. Heartbroken, she leaves alone and is never seen again.

With Raju's story apparently concluded, Rhea leaves. While travelling on a bus, she notices a newspaper photograph showing a crowd at a cricket match. One of the spectators looks exactly like Raju. She returns to Vittal Seth and shows him the photograph. Shocked, he agrees to help her investigate further. Together they visit Imtiaz, who has since retired.

Imtiaz refuses to reveal anything and insists that he personally shot Raju dead. Rhea then reveals that she is actually Raju's daughter. When Nitya left the railway station, she was pregnant with Rhea. She later died while giving birth, leaving information about Raju with the hospital staff. Rhea's adoptive parents only recently told her the truth. Her claim of being a journalist writing an article about Raju is merely a pretext for finding her father. Moved by her story, Imtiaz finally reveals what really happened.

Just before killing Raju, Imtiaz discovers that Raju had once saved his sister's life. To repay the debt, he decides to spare Raju on the condition that he remain legally dead and completely abandon his criminal life. Raju agrees. Imtiaz then stages his death to make him escape.

Rhea and Vittal Seth travel to the location where the newspaper photograph was taken and finally find Raju alive. It is revealed that after his escape, Raju tried unsuccessfully to find Nitya. He eventually reformed and used his illicit wealth to establish a cricket academy for underprivileged children who dream of becoming cricketers but cannot afford proper training. Since then, he has lived a quiet and honest life. Rhea and Raju are finally reunited.

== Cast ==
- Sree Vishnu as "Railway" Raju
- Nara Rohit as SI Imtiaz Ali
- Tanya Hope as Nithya
- Sasha Singh as Riya
- Brahmaji as Vittal Seth
- Rajiv Kanakala as Minister Ashok Reddy
- Nassar as Buchi Reddy
- Ajay as Nadayar
- Vennela Kishore as Rambabu
- Prabhas Sreenu as Solomon
- Srinivasa Reddy as Srinu
- Rajyalakshmi as Raju's mother
- Appaji Ambarisha Darbha as Riya's father
- Manasa Himavarsha as Ahalya
- G. V. Sudhakar Naidu as Baghwan Das
- Harish Uthaman as Mallikarjun
- Ravi Varma as Naxalite Savyasachi
- Ravi Prakash as "Railway" Raju's cricket coach
- Sameer Hasan as Chief Cricket Selection Member
- Satya Prakash as Purushottham
- Jeeva as IPS officer
- Raj Madiraju as an IPS officer
- Rajendran as Lingaraju
- Kalicharan Sanjay
- Jabaradasth Naveen
- TNR
- Satyadev as Vinay Kumar / Tester (cameo appearance)
  - Master Sai Neeraj as Tester (Child)

== Soundtrack ==
Appatlo Okadundevadu

Soundtrack album by Sai Karthik
- Released: 26 November 2016
- Recorded: 2016
- Genre: Soundtrack
- Length: 21:07
- Language: Telugu
- Labels: Aran Music; Divo
- Producer: Sai Karthik

Sai Karthik chronology
Intlo Deyyam Nakem Bhayam (2016)	Appatlo Okadundevadu (2016)	Golisoda (2016)

The soundtrack of the film was composed by Sai Karthik and marketed by Aran Music along with Divo on 26 November 2016.

Track list
No.	Title	Lyrics	Artist(s)	Length
1.	"Tomorrow"	Vanamali	Yazin Nizar	4:11
2.	"Jaraa Itharavo"	Mohemmed Shakeel	Saketh Komanduri	2:12
3.	"Pasi Puvunu"	Kasarla Shyam	Rohit Paritala	2:35
4.	"Ee Kshanam"	Balaji	Dinker kalvala, Saicharan Bhaskaruni	3:38
5.	"Nee Navvu Leni"	Suddala Ashok Teja	Divija Karthik	2:30
6.	"Jatharakeldaama"	Suddala Ashok Teja	Deepthi Pardhasaradhy	1:25
7.	"Kannu Teriste"	Kasarla Shyam	Saicharan Bhaskaruni, Saketh Komanduri, Raghuram	2:38
8.	"A Neeli Mabbullona"	Suddala Ashok Teja	Saicharan Bhaskaruni	2:30
Total length:				21:07

== Reception ==
=== Critical reception ===
The Times of India gave 3.5 out of 5 stars stating "[s]cript and the screenplay are the heroes of this film. Appatlo Okadundevadu is a gripping story, high on action and emotion. A rare feat to achieve and yet delivered effectively."

Suresh Kavirayani writing for Deccan Chronicle, awarded the film three stars and opined, "Appatlo Okadundevadu is an interesting film with an unexpected climax. Director Saagar K Chandra’s neat narration and the way he has handled the cast and the movie certainly speaks volumes about his skill."
