= Okkadine =

- Theatrical Release Poster
- Directed by: Srinivas Raga
- Written by: Chintapalli Ramana
- Produced by: C. V. Reddy
- Starring: Nara Rohit; Nithya Menon
- Cinematography: Andrew
- Edited by: Marthand K. Venkatesh
- Music by: Karthik
- Production company: Gulabi Movies
- Release date: 14 February 2013
- Running time: 133 minutes
- Country: India
- Language: Telugu

Okkadine is a 2013 Telugu film directed by Srinivas Raga and produced by C. V. Reddy, under Gulabi Movies. The film stars Nara Rohit and Nithya Menon in lead roles. The film was dubbed into Hindi as Aur Ek Dushman and into Malayalam as Kanalattam.

== Plot ==
The movie begins with Sailaja (Nithya Menon) arriving in Hyderabad from USA. She is the daughter of a famous philanthropist Sivaji Rao (Sai Kumar). Sivaji Rao is revealed to be a very good man. He owns many orphanages to help people and is set to start a political career. Sailaja is his pampered daughter. After Sailaja goes home, her father tells her he has to go abroad to speak to his supporters before he begins his foray into politics. Sailaja although disappointed as she was looking forward to spending time with him, wishes him luck and tells him she is planning to go a trip with her friend Sujatha, who she met online. The next day, Sailaja meets Sujatha (Snigda) and they plan to go to Vizag where Sujatha's uncle will take care of them. Meanwhile, outside the cafe they are meeting, a corrupt police officer (G.V. Sudhakar Naidu) is torturing a pregnant women so he can reveal the whereabouts of her husband. Sailaja and Sujatha go to the pregnant woman's aid. When the policeman threatens Sailaja and strikes Sujatha, Sailaja curses him saying people like him shouldn't be alive. At the same second, the policeman is shot with a sniper. The unnamed shooter is shown to be the protagonist (Nara Rohit).

Sailaja and Sujatha reach Vizag and meet the latter's uncle. He asks to be called Sreenu Mama (Naga Babu) by everyone. Just as they are about to go sight seeing, Sujatha tells Sailaja that she has to go home immediately. Sailaja then wanders alone in the forest. She sees a small girl wearing a tiger mask and follows her. Her leg gets caught in an animal trap. The little girl calls out for her uncle. A man comes running up wearing a similar mask. When he removes it he is shown to be the shooter from before. He removes her leg from the trap and takes her to his home to treat her foot as the blood has clotted. When Sailaja goes to his home she sees a joint family who are very amicable and loving. She spends time with them and sees the relationship they have. She tells them that she lost her mother at a young age and the family reminds her of her mother. The man who helped her tells her his name is Surya. Sailaja meets with Surya's family everyday and takes part in their everyday fun and frolic. She sees a local MLA (Jeeva) beating up a youngster for rebelling against him. She tries to go help him but is stopped by Sreenu Mama. He tells her that the MLA is ruthless and stops at nothing and only God can stop him. The MLA starts to leave and gets into a jeep. Sailaja yells that people like him should be killed. Instantaneously, the jeep blows up killing the MLA and his posse. Sailaja is shaken by this and believes he died because of her. She is consoled by Surya and his family.

One day Surya takes her to a small temple in the forest. There he tells her that whoever lights a diya in that temple gets their wish. Sailaja tells him she wishes to be a part of his family and that in her next life she wants to be her father's daughter again. She hounds Surya to tell her what he wished. He then tells her he wished to be by her side forever and proposes to her. Sailaja then reveals that she is leaving the next day. Surya's family tells her that they will see her off. Sailaja calls her father to tell him she has fallen in love. Her father is very happy and promises to talk to her about it when he returns.

The next day Sailaja goes to a fair that happens every two years. There she looks around for Surya but she cannot find him. Sreenu Mama asks her who she is looking for. Sailaja tells him she is looking for Surya and his family. Everyone around is shown to be shocked and frightened. Sailaja asks him why everyone is looking at her like that. Sreenu Mama tells her that Surya's family has been dead for two years and shows her their graves. She runs to their house and sees that it is in ruins and unkempt. She faints because of the shock. When she wakes up she receives a call from her father and tells him she needs to know what happened. Her father asks her whereabouts and promises to send an investigation team. Sailaja is then calmed by Sreenu Mama. A TV crew led by Sensational Sodhan (Brahmanandam) arrives at the resort Sailaja stays in and tries to interview her, but Sreenu Mama sends them away. The investigation team sent by Sivaji Rao arrives and asks what happened to Surya's family. Sreenu Mama tells them that 2 years back, Surya's family was preparing for the fair as always and Surya was a day late. By the time Surya arrived the whole family was killed by a psycho. Unable to bear the grief Surya had jumped from a waterfall and was later buried by him. The team lead, Guru, asks for any pictures of the family. Sreenu Mama tells him that he had burned them as he couldn't see them anymore because of the bad memories. The team then digs up a newspaper which was printed the day after Surya's family died. The photos of the family however are different from the ones Sailaja has seen. They then go to the house and check under a table and finds two portraits and newspapers with Sivaji Rao on it.

Guru then reveals that it had been a set up from the start and Sailaja had been lured there by Surya with the help of Sujatha and Sreenu Mama. Sailaja is escorted away. Sreenu Mama is taken to a forest where Guru yells to Surya to reveal himself. Surya comes and kills the whole team. Sailaja witnesses this and slaps Surya for betraying her and asks him why he has lured her so. Surya then reveals the whole story to Sailaja. His sister, Archana had fallen in love with Sivaji Rao's son (Vishnuvardhan), Sailaja's older brother. The family had called Sivaji Rao to ask set up wedding preparations. Sivaji Rao had told them that he would come the next day with his son for the engagement. This news is conveyed to Surya who was in Dehradun for his IFS training, he starts home immediately. That night, a police convoy alerts everyone in the town about a psycho murderer running loose. Surya's family meanwhile is preparing for the engagement. One of Surya's nieces plays with a video camera and places it outside the house. She sees a masked man and mistakes him to be a guest. The masked man then proceeds to murder everyone in the family and leaves.

The next day Surya arrives and sees that his family is dead. The local MLA shown before is berating the police for not helping the family. Later on the police claim they have caught and killed the psycho responsible. Surya walks around his home and looks at the family photographs. He discovers the camera outside and sees the face of the actual murderer. He remembers seeing him in a photo and finds out that he is Sivaji Rao's driver. The driver attacks Surya to cover up his tracks. Surya kills him and tells Sreenu Mama. It is revealed that the driver was sent by Sivaji Rao himself.

The flashback ends and Sailaja finds it hard to believe it. Surya tells her that her father had masqueraded as a good man to get followers and has become like a God for everyone. He had Surya's family killed because he wanted his son to marry a multi millionaire's only daughter to funnel his wealth into his political foray. Surya tells Sailaja that he had lured her so that she realizes what he has lost and will reveal to the world the atrocities her father committed. Sailaja goes to her father and confronts him. He convinces that he had not planned the murders and that they were committed by his in law. Surya and the makeshift family are shown to be planning the final stage of their revenge. Surya reveals that he too had fallen in love with Sailaja. Sreenu Mama goes to Sivaji Rao and informs him of this and tell him that Surya should not be taken away from Sailaja because of their enmity. Sivaji Rao's men attack him and he kills them. He is then duped and killed by Sivaji Rao. This Whole thing was meanwhile recorded by Sodhan who shows the tape to Sailaja.

Surya is crestfallen seeing his dead uncle. Furious he attacks Sivaji Rao in broad daylight. He kills all of his henchman and points a gun at him when police arrive at the scene. The policemen threaten to shoot Surya if he doesn't put his gun down. The press people ask him why he is trying to kill such a good man. Surya tells them that Sivaji Rao is not a god but a ruthless man who killed his own family and that he is not afraid of death anymore. Sailaja comes and stops him. Sivaji Rao tries to convince her to save him but she tells him that she knows the truth. She tells everyone that what Surya is telling is the truth and she has evidence. Relieved, Surya puts his gun away. Sivaji Rao's henchman shoots at Surya and is killed by the police. Amidst this confusion, Sivaji Rao grabs hold of a gun and holds a policeman hostage. He tries to kill Surya but Sailaja shields him. Sivaji Rao yells at her to move but she does not budge. Sailaja tells him he deserves to die. Frustrated Sivaji Rao moves towards her and steps on a dead policeman's arm while doing so. The gun in the policeman's hand goes off and shoots Sivaji Rao dead. The movie ends with Surya in an embrace with Sailaja.

== Cast ==
- Nara Rohit as Surya
- Nithya Menon as Sailaja
- Kota Srinivasa Rao as Sivaiah
- Bramhanandam as Sodhan
- Nagendra Babu as Sreenu Mama
- Sai Kumar as Sivaji Rao
- Sree Vishnu as Sailaja's brother
- G. V. Sudhakar Naidu as Inspector
- Snigdha as Sujatha
- Chandra Mohan
- Ali
- Sudha
- Satya Krishnan
- Srinivasa Reddy
- M. S. Narayana
- Jeevi
- Gurpreet Singh
- Rachana Maurya in an item number

== Production ==
=== Filming ===
The film was launched formally on 5 Jan 2012 in Hyderabad. The first schedule of the film was started same day and it was continued to 9 January 2012 in Hyderabad. The second schedule of the film was started on 24 February 2012 in Araku. The climax scenes of the film was started on 28 June 2012 in Ramoji Film City. An item song ‘Puttintollu Tharimesaru…’ (remix of Jaya Malini’s super hit number) was filmed on Rachana Mourya and 70 other dancers in Ramoji Film City.

== Soundtrack ==
Okkadine

Soundtrack album by Karthik
- Released: 22 October 2012
- Recorded: 2012
- Genre: Soundtrack
- Length: 21:02
- Label: Aditya Music
- Producer: Karthik

Karthik chronology
Aravaan (2011)	Okkadine (2012)	Courier Boy Kalyan / Tamilselvanum Thaniyar Anjalum (2015)

The music was composed by playback singer Karthik and this was his debut album in Telugu. The audio release was held on 22 October 2012 at Shilpakala Vedika in Hyderabad. Nandamuri Balakrishna, Krishnam Raju, K. L. Narayana, Sagar, Prasanna Kumar, Shekar Babu, Tammareddy Bharadwaja, Gopinath Reddy, Ashok Kumar and others attended the function. The audio was launched by Nandamuri Balakrishna.

Track listing
No.	Title	Lyrics	Singer(s)	Length
1.	"Seethakoka Nachchave"	Ramajogayya Sastry	Karthik, Darshana	3:56
2.	"Hey Po"	Krishna Chaitanya	Shweta Mohan	4:24
3.	"Dola Dola Dola"	Ramajogayya Sastry	Vijay Prakash, Pooja, Malavika	4:24
4.	"Puttintollu Tharimesaru"	Sahithi	Ranjith, Geeta Madhuri, Steeve Vatz	3:41
5.	"Hola Hola"	Bhaskarabhatla Ravi Kumar	Karthik, M. M. Manasi	4:37
Total length:				21:02

== Satellite rights ==
The film satellite rights were sold to Sun TV Network for ₹4 crores.

== Release ==
The Central Board of Film Certification rated it U/A. The film was initially planned to release on 7 December 2012, but was Postponed to several times. Finally the film was released on Valentine's Day on 14 February 2013.

=== Critical reception ===
The film received mixed reviews to negative from critics, Timesofap.com gave Rating 2.25/5 and commenting as the film disappoints with illogical screenplay and dragging narration. Oneindia entertainment has given a rating 2.5/5 for the film. The Times of India gave 2 stars for 5. Rediff gave 1.5 stars for 5.
