= Diksha Panth =

Indian film actress

- Born: Nanital, Uttarakhand, India
- Occupation: Actress
- Years active: 2012–present

Diksha Panth is an Indian actress, known for her works predominantly in Telugu cinema. She was selected as a Bigg Boss Telugu contestant through wild card entry and was evicted on the 63rd day. She appeared in Shankarabharanam and Oka Laila Kosam and got her first break in the Telugu movie Gopala Gopala.

== Filmography ==
Key
†	Denotes films that have not yet been released

- Notes: all films are in Telugu, unless otherwise noted.

Year	Film	Role(s)	Notes
2010	Varudu	Sandy's friend	
2012	Racha	Basanthi	
2012	Gullu Dada Thiree	Reshma	Hyderabadi Urdu film
2014	Oka Laila Kosam	Sheela	
2015	Noothi Lo Kappalu		
2015	Gopala Gopala	Gopika Matha	
2015	Sankarabharanam		
2016	Kavvintha		
2016	Soggade Chinni Nayana	Hamsa's sister	
2016	O Sthree Repu Raa!		
2016	Banthi Poola Janaki	Janaki	
2016	Chal Chal Gurram		
2017	Maya Mall		
2018	Ego		

== Television ==
Year	Show	Role	Channel	Result
2017	Bigg Boss Telugu (season 1)	Wild-Card Contestant- Entered on Day 15	Star Maa	6th Place- Evicted on Day 63
