= Sai Karthik =

Sai Kartheek
- Born: 23 February 1983
- Genre: Film Score
- Occupations: Film score composer, Music director
- Instruments: Pads, Keyboards, Drums
- Years active: 2008–present

Sai Karthik is an Indian music composer, multi instrumentalist, and playback singer known for his works predominantly in Telugu cinema. Although he entered the film industry as a drummer for live shows, he soon turned film composer with the film Aboo Adavallu (2008). He also composed music for Pataas (2015). The 2019 film Tenali Ramakrishna BA. BL was his 75th as a music director.

== Personal life and career ==
At the age of nine, he played rhythm pads player in live shows, after he completed studies aged 15 years. After he moved to Chennai, he worked under the supervision of music directors including like Vandemataram Srinivas, Koti, Mani Sharma, S. P. Balasubramanyam, Devi Sri Prasad, and R. P. Patnaik. He performed more than 3000 lives show as a drummer and pad player.

He then spent six and a half years under the tutelage of Mani Sharma and worked on live shows with him at the United States.

He began his career as a drummer and as a composer with the Telugu film Abbo Adavallu, while his first blockbuster Telugu film was Pataas in 2015. Raja Cheyi Vesthe in 2016 was Sai Kartheek 50th film as a music director.

== Discography ==
Scores and soundtracks

Year	Title	Language	Notes
2008	Abbo Adavallu	Telugu	
2008	Call Center	Telugu	
2008	Brahmanandam Drama Company	Telugu	
2008	Andariki Vandanalu	Telugu	
2009	Salute	Kannada	
2010	Srimathi Kalyanam	Telugu	
2010	Police Police	Telugu	
2011	Vara Prasad Potti Prasad	Telugu	
2011	Galli Kurollu	Telugu	
2011	Mangala	Telugu	
2011	Killer	Telugu	
2011	9 to 12	Kannada	
2011	Dhan Dhana Dhan	Kannada	
2012	Alallu	Telugu	
2012	Lucky	Telugu	
2012	Alaithe	Telugu	
2012	Yedartha Prema Katha	Telugu	
2012	Prematho Chetana	Telugu	
2013	Om 3D	Telugu	Background score
2013	Mr. Rajesh	Telugu	
2013	Ninnu Chusina Kshanam	Telugu	
2013	Chudamani Cheppalani	Telugu	
2013	Romance	Telugu	
2013	Priyathama Neevachata Kusalama	Telugu	
2013	Prathinidhi	Telugu	
2013	Mondodu	Telugu	
2013	Keshriya	Telugu	
2013	Jinke Mari	Kannada	
2014	Paisa	Telugu	
2014	Rowdy	Telugu	
2014	Nuvvala Nenila	Telugu	
2014	Gallo Thelinatundi	Telugu	
2014	Kiraak	Telugu	
2014	I Am That Change	Telugu	Short film
2015	Pataas	Telugu	
2015	Asura	Telugu	
2015	Bham Bolenath	Telugu	
2015	Noothilo Kappalu	Telugu	
2015	Superstar Kidnap	Telugu	
2015	James Bond	Telugu	
2015	Dongaata	Telugu	
2015	Raju Gari Gadhi	Telugu	
2015	Ketugadu	Telugu	
2015	Budugu	Telugu	
2015	Janda Pai Kapiraju	Telugu	Background score
2015	Jatha Kalise	Telugu	
2016	Terror	Telugu	
2016	Tuntari	Telugu	
2016	Run	Telugu	
2016	Raja Cheyyi Vesthe	Telugu	
2016	Eedo Rakam Aado Rakam	Telugu	
2016	Supreme	Telugu	
2016	Selfie Raja		
2016	Nayaki	Telugu / Tamil	Background score
2016	Mental Police	Telugu	
2016	Shankara	Telugu	
2016	Dwaraka	Telugu	
2016	Intlo Deyyam Nakem Bhayam	Telugu	
2016	Appatlo Okadundevadu	Telugu	
2016	Golisoda	Kannada	1 song; dubbed in Telugu as Evadu Thakkuva Kadu
2017	Darsakudu	Telugu	
2017	Maya Mall	Telugu	
2017	Raja the Great	Telugu	
2017	Next Nuvve	Telugu	
2017	Suvarna Sundari	Telugu	
2018	EGO	Telugu	
2018	Aatagallu	Telugu	
2018	Lover	Telugu	
2018	Gangstars	Telugu	
2018	Natakam	Telugu	
2019	Burra Katha	Telugu	
2019	Tenali Ramakrishna BA. BL	Telugu	
2021	Gully Rowdy	Telugu	
2021	Deyyam	Telugu	
2022	Gangster Gangaraju	Telugu	
2022	Tees Maar Khan	Telugu	
2022	Bujji Ila Raa	Telugu	
2022	Triple Riding	Kannada	
2023	Meter	Telugu	
2024	Dheera	Telugu	
2026	Naa Wife Missing	Telugu	
