= Solo (2011 film) =

- Directed by: Parasuram
- Written by: Parasuram
- Produced by: Vamsikrishna Srinivas
- Starring: Nara Rohit; Nisha Agarwal; Prakash Raj; Sayaji Shinde; Jayasudha; Ali
- Cinematography: Dasaradhi Sivendra
- Edited by: Marthand K. Venkatesh
- Music by: Mani Sharma
- Production company: S.V.K CINEMA
- Release date: 25 November 2011
- Country: India
- Language: Telugu
- Box office: ₹8 crore distributors' share

Solo is a 2011 Telugu-language romantic family drama film written and directed by Parasuram. The film features Nara Rohit and Nisha Agarwal in the lead roles. The film featured music by Mani Sharma. It was remade in Oriya as Haata Dhari Chaaluthaa with Anubhav Mohanty and Varsha Priyadarshini.

Solo was successful at the box office.

== Cast ==
- Nara Rohit as Gautham
- Nisha Agarwal as Vaishnavi
- Prakash Raj as Raghupathi Naidu, Vaishnavi's father
- Sayaji Shinde as Vishwanath, Ravi's father
- Jayasudha as Vaishnavi's aunt
- Ali as James Cameron
- Srinivasa Reddy as Gautham's friend
- Rao Ramesh as Gautham's foster uncle cum boss
- M.S. Narayana as Dharma
- Sree Vishnu as Vishnu, Gautham's friend
- Ravi Prakash as Ravi, Vaishnavi's would-be
- Swapnika as Vaishnavi's friend
- Pavitra Lokesh as Vaishnavi's mother
- Praveen
- Gundu Sudarshan
- Ranganath
- Fish Venkat
- Mumaith Khan

== Soundtrack ==
The music for the movie was composed by Mani Sharma. The audio was released in Hyderabad on 22 October 2011 by Chandrababu Naidu and was released on Aditya Music.

Solo

Soundtrack album by Mani Sharma
- Released: 22 October 2011
- Recorded: 2011
- Genre: Soundtrack
- Length: 25:30
- Label: Aditya Music
- Producer: Mani Sharma

Mani Sharma chronology
Maaro (2011)	Solo (2011)	Racha (2012)

Track-List
No.	Title	Lyrics	Singer(s)	Length
1.	"Almost Atom Bomb"	Krishna Chaitanya	Ranjith, Rahul Nambiar, Achu, Rita	4:37
2.	"Marumallela Vaana"	Krishna Chaitanya	Vedala Hemachandra	4:07
3.	"Ammamamamoo"	Krishna Chaitanya	Sreerama Chandra Mynampati, Malavika	4:54
4.	"Na Prema Kathaku"	Ramajogayya Sastry	Haricharan	4:06
5.	"Singapore"	Ramajogayya Sastry	Sravana Bhargavi	4:30
6.	"Puduthune Solo"	Ramajogayya Sastry	N. C. Karunya	3:16
Total length:				25:30

== Release ==
=== Reception ===
Jeevi of Idlebrain.com rated the film 3/5 and wrote that "On a whole, Solo is a genuine attempt by the director and makes a decent watch if you ignore the lag in second half".

=== Satellite rights ===
The satellite rights of the film were acquired by MAA TV for ₹ 8.75 crore. The film opened to mixed reviews and became an Super Hit at box-office.

=== Other versions ===
The film was dubbed and released in Tamil during July 2014 as En Kathalukku Naane Villain.
