= Noothilo Kappalu =

- Directed by: Chanti Gnamamani
- Written by: Chanti Gnamamani
- Produced by: Vinay; Poovati
- Starring: Rajendra Prasad; Pari Singh; Diksha Panth; Bharat Bhushan; Ram Tej; Vijay Sai; Manoj Nandam
- Cinematography: S. Murali Mohan Reddy
- Edited by: Vinay Ram
- Music by: Sai Karthik; Satya Kashyap; Subhash Anand; Ghantasala Viswanath; S. R. Shankar
- Production company: Police Star Pictures
- Release date: 17 April 2015
- Country: India
- Language: Telugu

Noothilo Kappalu (transl. Frogs in a well) is a 2015 Indian Telugu-language comedy drama film written and directed by Chanti Gnamamani. The film stars Rajendra Prasad and Pari Singh.

== Cast ==
- Rajendra Prasad
- Pari Singh
- Diksha Panth
- Bharat Bhushan
- Ram Tej
- Jaya Prakash Reddy as Inspector S. Madhusudhana
- Vijay Sai
- Manoj Nandam as Nandu
- Thagubothu Ramesh
- Allari Subhashini
- Shankar Melkote
- Jenny
- Sandhya Janak
- Rocket Raghava
- Sanjay Reddy as Nandu's father

== Production ==
The term "frogs" in the title is used as a metaphor to refer to people since frogs inside a well do not come out, nor do they let others get out. The film examines narrow-mindedness in society and had the tagline Paiki raavu, Raanivvavu. As of mid-2012, 70% of the film's shooting was complete. Jaya Prakash Reddy, who plays police inspector, danced to "Gangnam Style" for a deleted scene of this film.

== Soundtrack ==
The music directors Sai Karthik, Satya Kashyap, Subhash Anand, Ghantasala Viswanath, and S. R. Shankar were involved in composing various songs.

Track list
No.	Title	Lyrics	Music	Singer(s)	Length
1.	"Tagithe Okka Sukka"	Raja	Sai Karthik	Rajendra Prasad	4:21
2.	"Orayyo"	S. V. V. Ramanjaneyulu	Satya Kashyap	Sravana Bhargavi	3:54
3.	"Giligintalu"	Syam	Subhash Anand	N. C. Karunya	4:13
4.	"Idigo"	Kittu Vissapragada	Ghantasala Viswanath	Sreerama Chandra	4:38
5.	"Beware of Daddies"	S. V. V. Ramanjaneyulu	S. R. Shankar	Dhaunjay, Raghuram	4:04
Total length:					23:10
