= Satna Titus =

Indian actress (born 1991)

- Born: Kochi, Kerala, India
- Occupation: Actress
- Years active: 2015 – present
- Spouse: Karthik (m. 2017)

Satna Titus is an Indian actress who works in the Tamil and Telugu film industries. She made her debut in the Tamil film Pichaikkaran (2016).

== Career ==
Satna Titus made her acting debut in the low-budget Tamil film, Guru Sukran (2015). She was then cast in a leading role in the Vijay Antony-starrer Pichaikkaran (2016) directed by Sasi. Portraying an independent young woman who owns a pizza joint, Titus won critical acclaim for her performance, with a critic from The Hindu calling her "refreshingly grounded" and Sify.com stating "she looks cute and her girl next door look is a big plus". The film subsequently went on to become one of the most successful Tamil films of the year, while its dubbed Telugu version also did profitable business. The success of the film prompted Titus to sign on to appear in films including Yeidhavan (2017) and Thittam Pottu Thirudura Koottam (2017), while she was also signed for Ameer's Santhana Devan (2018), before having to opt out.

== Personal life ==
In September 2016, Titus registered her marriage to Karthik, a distributor for the film, Pichaikkaran (2016). Titus' parents had initially filed a police complaint against Karthik stating that he was trying to prematurely end Titus' acting career, but later withdrew the complaint. An official wedding ceremony was held in February 6 2017, with Titus agreeing to finish her pre-existing acting commitments before taking a sabbatical.

== Filmography ==
- All films are in Tamil, unless otherwise noted.

Year	Title	Role	Notes
2016	Pichaikkaran	Magizhini	Debut film
2017	Yeidhavan	SI Janani	
2018	Needi Naadi Oke Katha	Dharmika	Telugu film
2019	Thittam Poattu Thirudura Kootam	Anjali	
2024	Partners	Padma	Malayalam Film
