= Krishna Chaitanya (lyricist) =

Indian lyricist, writer and director

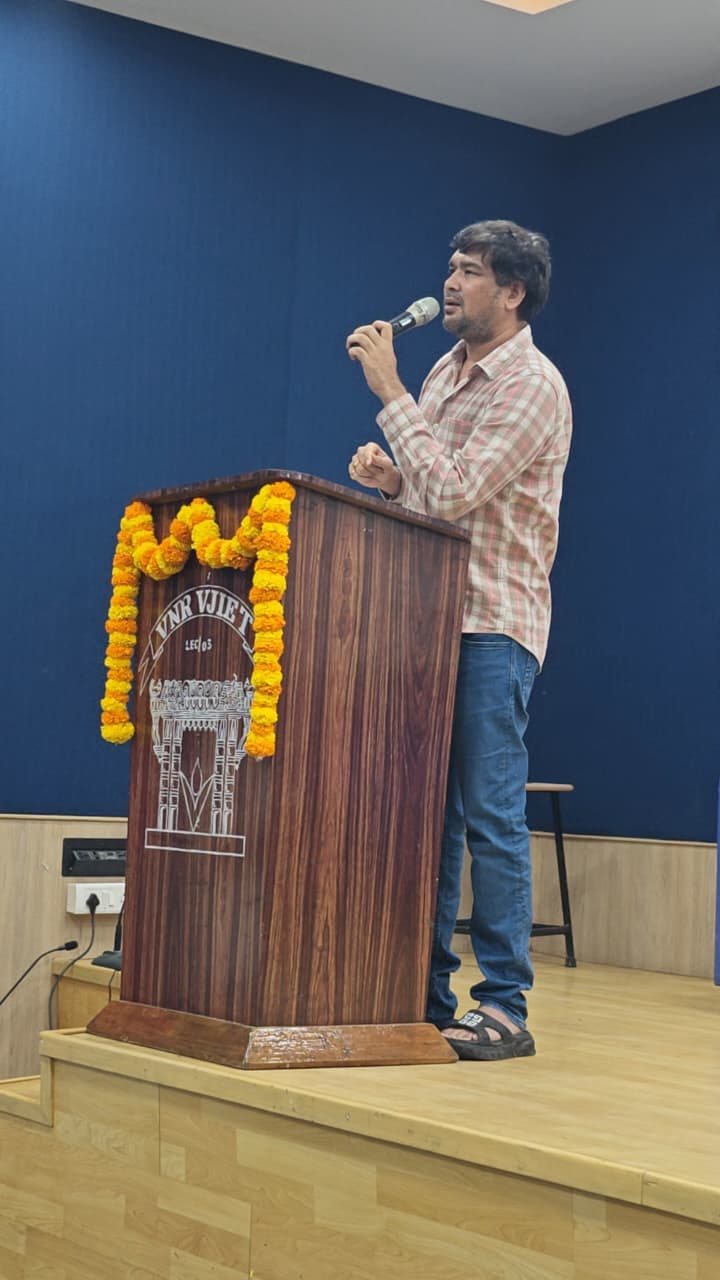
- Born: 2 May 1982 (age 44) Eluru, Andhra Pradesh, India
- Occupation: Film Director; Dialogue writer Screenwriter; Lyricist
- Period: 2006–present

Krishna Chaitanya is an Indian lyricist, writer and director. He mainly works as a lyricist for the Telugu films.

== Career ==
Krishna Chaitanya debuted with writing songs for Sambhavami yuge yuge but his first big break came with the film Yuvatha in which he penned all the songs.

== Filmography ==
=== As lyricist ===
Year	Film	Song(s)
2008	Yuvatha	All songs
2009	Anjaneyulu	Dil Se Bhol, Em Vayaso, Rajulakey Raraju, Nuvve Kanta Padavante
2009	Oy!	Sehari Sehari
2009	Jayeebhava	Telupu Rangu
2010	Brindavanam	Yuvakula Manasaina
2011	Oh My Friend	Sri Chaitanya Junior College, Maa Daddy Pockets
2011	Veedu Theda	Needaithe Kanu
2011	Pilla Zamindar	Thalabadi, Chuttu Chuttu, Oopiri, Rangu Rangu, PJ Club Mix
2011	Solo	Almost Atom Bomb, Marumallela Vaana, Ammamamamoo
2012	Ishq	Lachamma, Oh Priya Priya, Chinadana Nekosam
2013	Gunde Jaari Gallanthayyinde	Gunde Jaari Gallanthayyinde, Thu Hi Rey, Ding Ding Ding, Neeve Neeve
2013	Swamy Ra Ra	Krishnudi Varasulantha, Adhento, Edu Vaadu Evado Ledu, Life Ante, Yo Yo Yo Memu Antha
2013	Okkadine	Hey Po
2013	Baadshah	Sairo Sairo
2013	Greeku Veerudu	I Hate Love Stories
2014	Yevadu	Freedom
2014	Aaha Kalyanam (Dubbed version)	No One Dancing, Savari Savari, Mike Testing, Nuvvo Sagam, Virise Virise, Urumu Mundo, Boss Boss
2014	Power	Nuvvu Nenu Janta
2014	Karthikeya	Inthalo Ennenni Vinthalo
2014	Rowdy Fellow	Aa Seetadevi, Call of the Rowdy, Ra Ra Rowdy, Red and Yellow
2014	Chinnadana Nee Kosam	Chinnadana Neekosam, Mundhugane, Ooh La Laa, Everybody Chalo, All I Wanna Say, Dil Dil Dil, Albeli
2016	Brahmotsavam	Balatripuramani, Put Your Hands Up
2016	Shourya	O Manasa
2016	Sarrainodu	Private Party
2016	Tuntari	Diamond Girl
2016	A.. Aa..	Anasuya Kosam
2020	Ala Vaikunthapurramuloo	OMG Daddy
2020	Colour Photo	Ekaantham
2021	A1 Express	Poratamey
2021	Maestro	Vennello Aadapilla
2021	Macherla Niyojakavargam	Chill Maro
2022	Oke Oka Jeevitham	Maripoya
2023	Spy	Azadi
2024	Committee Kurrollu	"Prathi Kshanam"
2024	Appudo Ippudo Eppudo	"Hey Taara", "Kabhi Haa Kabhi Naa"

=== As director ===
Year	Film	Cast	Producer	Notes
2014	Rowdy Fellow	Nara Rohit, Vishakha Singh	T. Prakash Reddy	Directorial Debut
2018	Chal Mohan Ranga	Nithiin, Megha Akash	Pawan Kalyan; Trivikram Srinivas; Sudhakar Reddy	
2024	Gangs of Godavari	Vishwak Sen, Neha Shetty, Anjali	Suryadevara Naga Vamsi	
