= Nara Rohith =

Indian actor and producer

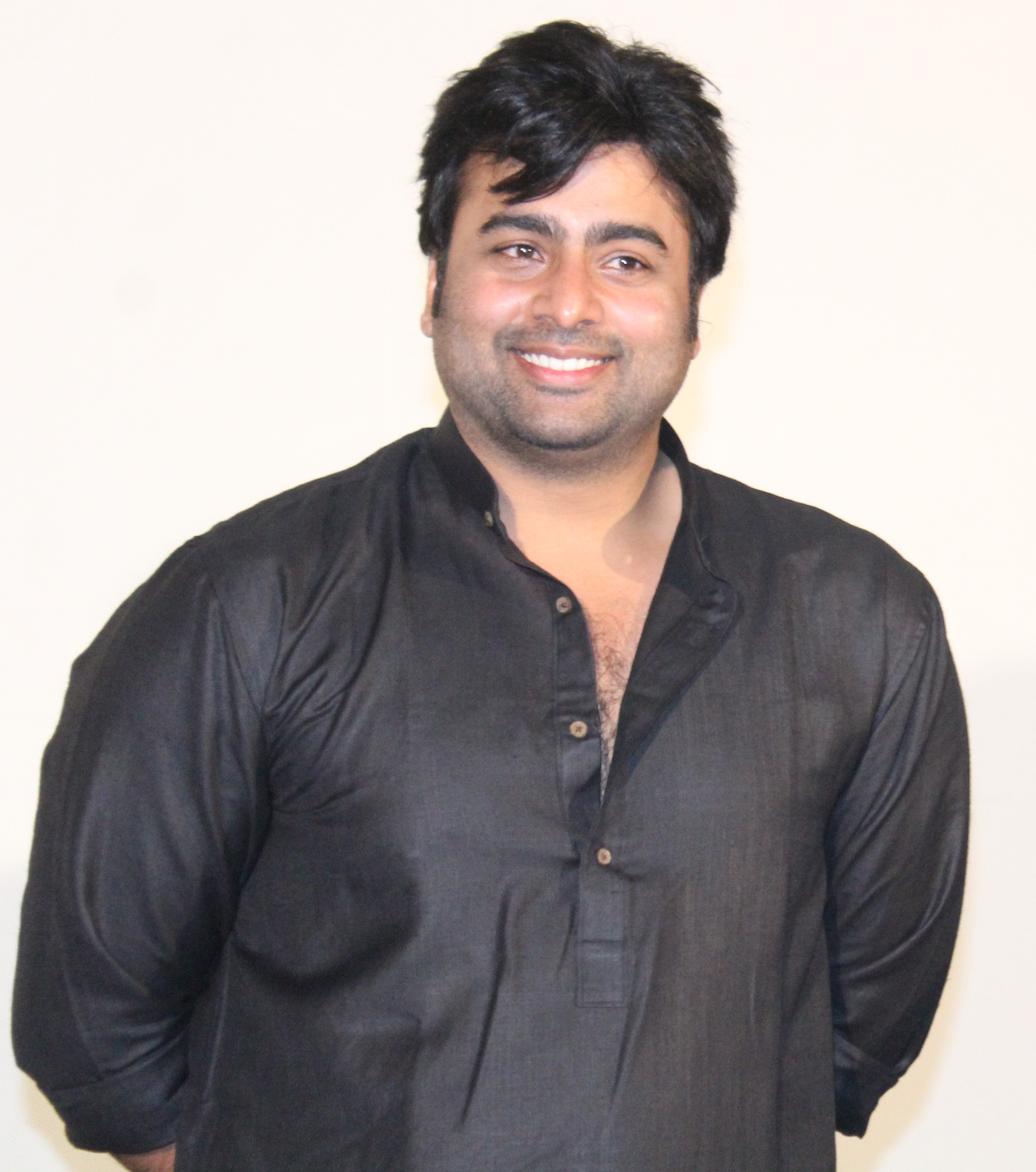
- Rohith in 2015
- Born: Tirupati, Andhra Pradesh, India
- Education: Anna University; New York Film Academy
- Occupations: Actor; producer; playback singer
- Years active: 2009–2018; 2024–present
- Parent: Nara Ramamurthy Naidu (father)
- Family: See Nandamuri–Nara family

Nara Rohith is an Indian actor in, and producer of, Telugu films. An alumnus of New York Film Academy, he is known for works such as Baanam (2009), Solo (2011), Prathinidhi (2014), Rowdy Fellow (2014), Asura (2015) and Jyo Achyutananda (2016). He owns the production house Aran Media Works.

Rohith contributed a voice-over to Swamy Ra Ra (2013) and Okkadu Migiladu (2017).

== Early life ==
Nara Rohith is the son of Nara Ramamurthy Naidu, the brother of N. Chandrababu Naidu, the chief minister of Andhra Pradesh. He did his schooling in Hyderabad and Intermediate in Vignan College at Vadlamudi. He did his B.Tech in Industrial Bio Technology at Anna University, Chennai. He then did a course in acting from New York Film Academy, New York, and a film making course in Los Angeles.

== Personal life ==
On 13 October 2024, Rohith got engaged to his Prathinidhi 2 co-star Siree Lella in Hyderabad.

== Career ==
Rohith made his acting debut with Baanam (2009), directed by Chaitanya Dantuluri. The film was released to positive reviews. He got moderate success with his second film Solo, which was released in 2011 and directed by Parasuram. In 2012, he did a supporting role in Ravi Teja's Sarocharu.

In 2013, he worked with director Srinivas Raga on Okkadine, co-starring Nithya Menon. The film was not successful at the box office. He made a comeback with the political film Pratinidhi (2014), which revolved around his character kidnapping the chief minister. The film was well received.

On the eve of Rohith's birthday, the movie Balakrishnudu's motion poster was released, which featured him in a toned body. Shutting out all the body shaming comments against him, the actor revealed his fit and healthy transformed body. The poster received a positive response. A great support and encouragement from director Pavan Mallela helped him to lose weight, said the actor in an interview with TV9.

After a six year gap, the movie Prathinidhi 2, directed by Murthy Devagupthapu, was released in 2024.

== Filmography ==
Key
†	Denotes films that have not yet been released

Year	Title	Role	Notes	Ref.
2009	Baanam	Bhagat Panigrahi		
2011	Solo	Gautam		
2012	Sarocharu	Gautam		
2013	Okkadine	Surya		
2014	Prathinidhi	Srinu		
2014	Rowdy Fellow	Rana Prathap Jayadev		
2015	Asura	N. Dharma Teja	Also presenter	
2016	Tuntari	Raju		
2016	Savitri	Rishi	Also singer of "Teenmaar" song	
2016	Raja Cheyyi Vesthe	Raja Ram		
2016	Nayaki	Aravind	Simultaneously shot in Tamil as Nayagi; cameo appearance	
2016	Jyo Achyutananda	Achyut		
2016	Shankara	Shankar		
2016	Appatlo Okadundevadu	Imtiyaz Ali		
2017	Shamanthakamani	Ranjith Kumar		
2017	Kathalo Rajakumari	Arjun Chakravarthy		
2017	Balakrishnudu	Balakrishna aka Balu		
2017	Mental Madhilo	Bus passenger	Cameo appearance	
2018	Needi Naadi Oke Katha	Philanthropist	Cameo appearance	
2018	Aatagallu	Siddharth		
2018	Veera Bhoga Vasantha Rayalu	Deepak Reddy		
2024	Prathinidhi 2	Chetan		
2025	Bhairavam	Varada		
2025	Sundarakanda	Siddharth		

=== As narrator ===
Year	Title
2013	Swamy Ra Ra
2017	Okkadu Migiladu
