= Sita Ramam (soundtrack) =

2022 soundtrack album by Vishal Chandrashekhar

Soundtrack album by Vishal Chandrashekhar
- Released: 3 August 2022
- Recorded: 2021–2022
- Genre: Feature film soundtrack
- Length: 20:18
- Language: Telugu
- Label: Sony Music India
- Producer: Vishal Chandrashekhar

Vishal Chandrashekhar chronology
O2 (2022)	Sita Ramam (2022)	Soppana Sundari (2023)

Singles from Sita Ramam
- 1. "Oh Sita Hey Rama" Released: 9 May 2022; 2. "Inthandham" Released: 1 July 2022; 3. "Kaanunna Kalyanam" Released: 15 July 2022; 4. "Oh Prema" Released: 3 August 2022; 5. "Eppudo Ninnu" Released: 12 August 2022; 6. "Tharali Tharali" Released: 19 August 2022

Sita Ramam is a 2022 Indian Telugu-language soundtrack album to the film of the same name composed by Vishal Chandrashekhar. The film's musical score is composed by Vishal Chandrashekhar in his third collaboration with Raghavapudi after Krishna Gaadi Veera Prema Gaadha (2016) and Padi Padi Leche Manasu (2018).

Sita Ramam featured nine songs in the film, which had lyrics written by Ananta Sriram, Sirivennela Seetharama Sastry and Krishna Kanth. For the dubbed versions, Madhan Karky (Tamil), Arun Alat and Vinayak Sasikumar (Malayalam), Kumaar, Jai Atre, Mandar Cholkar, Varun Grover, Vaibhav Joshi, Neha Shitole and Vishal Chandrashekhar (Hindi), were the lyricists. The soundtrack album only had four songs which are released as singles.

The soundtrack album was also released by Sony Music India on 3 August 2022. The soundtrack and score consisted of "organically rich" tunes which Chandrashekhar had attempted for the film, and has influences of Indian music from the 1960s to 1980s, interpreting traditional classical and orchestral music. The music received positive response, with praise on Chandrashekhar's composition.

== Background ==
For the music of Sita Ramam, Raghavapudi met his regular collaborator Chandrashekhar and narrated the script, which the latter called it as "fantastic story that has good situations which require songs", and added that "If the music has to be good, the story needs to demand music. One such film is Sita Ramam. The plot made me give exceptional music." Chandrashekhar opined that for a situation, he would conceive nearly three to four tunes, and as the film keeps developing, the preference of that particular tune might change. As he wanted to produce "organically rich music" for the film, he extensively researched on Indian music originated from the 1960s to 1980s. He was also devoid on using synthetic sounds for the film, to authenticate the musical setting.

Since Sita Ramam was initially planned to be simultaneously shot in Telugu and Tamil, the musical team had to work on composing the songs in both languages, and made several changes to ensure the uniqueness of the album. For the track "Inthandham", the tune of the original Telugu version was different from that of the dubbed Tamil version. The Tamil version of the song did not have the choral part in the initial recording. As Chandrashekhar was impressed with the choral tunes, he immediately recorded those portions for the Tamil. Each tracks had different tunes for multiple versions of the album. About the lyric writing process, he explained "Words are pronounced differently in different languages. I have a basic sense of how words are pronounced and how to make them sound the best in a song." Most of the songs in the film were based on Hindol raga, as according to Chandrashekhar, "songs not using that ragam used to become hits at that time."

The track "Kaanunna Kalyanam", the lyrics pattern has been followed in Malayalam and Hindi version songs. But in Tamil version song "Kannukkulle" the lyrics pattern was different. Compare to Telugu version, Tamil version has a change over of male and female lyric part written by Madhan Karky. To match the lip sync, the song was reshot in Tamil version alone.

Chandrashekhar hired nearly 140 musicians from different countries, who were instructed to play instruments specific to that country, which he stated as: "If we are using a specific German electronic instrument, it was played by a German musician and not an Indian. It's because only a native practitioner can play it authentically." Chandrashekhar's wife and playback singer, Sinduri Vishal had recorded three songs for the film in multiple languages, had also coordinated the music, with the entire team of musicians.

== Release ==
Vishal Chandrashekhar stated that the film had nearly nine songs, while the album only had four songs. The first track "Oh Sita Hey Rama" was released as a single on 9 May 2022. It was also released in Tamil as "Hey Sita Hey Rama" and in Malayalam as "Pen Poove Thenvande". S. P. Charan, who sang the male portions of the song in Telugu and Tamil, called the song as "timeless" and "beautiful", appreciating Chandrashekhar's composition, lyrics, music, programming. The second single track "Inthandham" was released on 1 July, and also released as "Kurumugil" in Tamil and "Aaromal" in Malayalam, respectively. The third single, "Kaanunna Kalyanam" was released on 15 July, alongside the Tamil and Malayalam versions, titled "Kannukkulle" and "Kannil Kannil", respectively. The fourth song "Oh Prema" (in Telugu), "Piriyadhey" (in Tamil) and "Thirike Vaa" (in Malayalam), were released alongside the album on 3 August.

Post the film's release, the song "Eppudo Ninnu" was released as a bonus single through YouTube on 12 August. The video song "Tharali Tharali" was released on 19 August. The soundtrack of the Hindi version, released on 1 September 2022, featuring all the nine songs from the album, including the film's theme music.

== Track listing ==
=== Telugu ===
No.	Title	Lyrics	Singer(s)	Length
1.	"Oh Sita Hey Rama"	Ananta Sriram	S. P. Charan, Ramya Behara	4:06
2.	"Inthandham"	Krishnakanth	S. P. Charan	3:38
3.	"Kaanunna Kalyanam"	Sirivennela Seetharama Sastry	Anurag Kulkarni, Sinduri Vishal	3:51
4.	"Oh Prema"	Krishnakanth	Kapil Kapilan, Chinmayi	3:28
Total length:				20:18

Extended Soundtrack
No.	Title	Lyrics	Singer(s)	Length
5.	"Eppudo Ninnu"	Ananta Sriram	Yazin Nizar	2:51
6.	"Nene Aa Nene"	Sirivennela Seetharama Sastry	Hariharan, K. S. Chithra, Sinduri Vishal	3:58
7.	"Evarini Adaganu"	Krishnakanth	Yazin Nizar	2:28
8.	"Tharali Tharali"	Krishnakanth	Sunitha Upadrashta	1:17
9.	"Ninnati Theepi"	Krishnakanth	Sunitha Upadrashta	2:45
10.	"Sita Ramam (Theme)"	—	—	3:34
Total length:				20:18

=== Tamil ===
All lyrics are written by Madhan Karky.

No.	Title	Singer(s)	Length
1.	"Hey Sita Hey Rama"	S. P. Charan, Sinduri Vishal	4:06
2.	"Kurumugil"	Sai Vignesh	3:38
3.	"Kannukkulle"	Haricharan, Sinduri Vishal	3:51
4.	"Piriyadhey"	Kapil Kapilan, Chinmayi	3:28

Extended Soundtrack
No.	Title	Singer(s)	Length
5.	"Uraiyum Theeyil"	Yazin Nizar	2:51
6.	"Thoodha"	Hariharan, K. S. Chithra, Sinduri Vishal	3:58
7.	"Kurunchiragu"	Aravind Annestt	2:28
8.	"Azhagin Azhagu"	Sinduri Vishal	1:17
9.	"Kaalangal Thaandi"	Sinduri Vishal	2:45
10.	"Sita Ramam (Theme)"	—	3:34
Total length:			20:18

=== Malayalam ===
No.	Title	Lyrics	Singer(s)	Length
1.	"Pen Poove Thenvande"	Arun Alat	Sharreth, Nithya Mammen	4:06
2.	"Aaromal"	Vinayak Sasikumar	Sooraj Santhosh	3:38
3.	"Kannil Kannil"	Arun Alat	K. S. Harisankar, Sinduri Vishal	3:51
4.	"Thirike Vaa"	Vinayak Sasikumar	Kapil Kapilan, Anne Amie	3:28

Extended Soundtrack
No.	Title	Lyrics	Singer(s)	Length
5.	"Ariyum Thorum"	Vinayak Sasikumar	Yazin Nizar	2:51
6.	"Njaanai"	Anwar Ali	Yazin Nizar, K. S. Chithra, Sinduri Vishal	3:58
7.	"Oru Karayarike"	Arun Alat	Shibi Srinivasan	2:28
8.	"Naa Dhir Dhi"	Arun Alat	Sinduri Vishal	1:17
9.	"Oru Yugam"	Arun Alat	Sinduri Vishal	2:45
10.	"Sita Ramam (Theme)"	—	—	3:34
Total length:				32:01

=== Hindi ===
No.	Title	Lyrics	Singer(s)	Length
1.	"O Sita"	Kumaar	Hrishikesh Ranade, Anweshaa	4:00
2.	"Dil Ka Pata"	Jai Atre	Abhay Jodhpurkar, Sinduri Vishal	3:49
3.	"Dil Se Dil"	Mandar Cholkar	Mandar Cholkar, Shashwat Singh	3:32
4.	"Ishq Karu"	Kumaar	Arunita Kanjilal, Shashwat Singh	3:22
5.	"Aaja Sajna"	Vishal Chandrashekhar	Aanandi Joshi	1:20
6.	"Chitthi"	Varun Grover	Yazin Nizar	2:49
7.	"Jane Kis Mod Pe"	Mandar Cholkar	Mandar Cholkar, Rahul Mukherjee	2:27
8.	"Aise Dhale Raat Re"	Vaibhav Joshi	Aanandi Joshi, Shivam Pathak	3:55
9.	"Khwab Tere"	Neha Shitole	Aanandi Joshi, Neha Shitole	2:45
10.	"Sita Ramam (Theme)"	—	—	3:34
Total length:				31:36

== Background Score ==
Sita Ramam

Film score by Vishal Chandrashekhar
- Released: 21 September 2022
- Recorded: 2021–2022
- Genre: film score
- Length: 39:57
- Language: Telugu
- Label: Sony Music India
- Producer: Vishal Chandrashekhar

Vishal Chandrashekhar chronology
O2 (2022)	Sita Ramam (2022)	Soppana Sundari (2023)

Sita Ramam (Original Background Score)
No.	Title	Length
1.	"PoK Theme"	04:14
2.	"Land of The Free(Afreen's Theme)"	01:40
3.	"One Month One Million"	01:04
4.	"Noor Jahan Palace"	00:26
5.	"Lt. Ram Madras Regiment 1965"
6.	Untitled	01:04
7.	"312 LoC Thee"	00:51
8.	"Mujahideen Shootout"	00:50
9.	"Ansari's Speech"	00:58
10.	"Agarta Burn"	01:12
11.	"Humanity Wins"	00:57
12.	"Naming Amrutha"
13.	Untitled	00:38
14.	"A Bag Full of Letters"	00:26
15.	"Radhika's Letter"	00:53
16.	"First Letter from Sita"	00:51
17.	"Train to Delhi"	00:26
18.	"Sita Mahalakshmi"	01:58
19.	"Mirrors"	01:04
20.	"Vishnu Sharma Intro"
21.	Untitled	01:34
22.	"Austin Magic Show"	02:07
23.	"Let's Move to the Next Act"	00:56
24.	"Kurukshetram"	00:20
25.	"Swayamvaram"	00:53
26.	"Subramanyam"	00:56
27.	"Sita is A Dream"	00:29
28.	"Oman Crisis"	01:15
29.	"Journey of A Lifetime"	02:02
30.	"I'll Be Waiting For Sita"	01:14
31.	"Marthandam The Photojournalist"	01:02
32.	"This is The Truth"	02:00
33.	"I Came Back For You"	00:46
34.	"Come Back Safe"	01:26
35.	"I Am Lt. Ram's Wife"	00:25
36.	"I Am Not A Traitor"	01:06
37.	"The Last Letter"	00:37
38.	"Thank You for The Letter"	01:17
Total length:		39:57

== Reception ==
Vishal Chandrashekhar's music for Sita Ramam, received positive response from critics, who called it as an "integral part of the storyline". The songs and the visual picturization also received praise. Behindwoods wrote "Vishal Chandrasekhar has indeed elevated the film with his timely musical cues." Indiaglitz wrote "The composition has been deliberately made to let the listener rejoice in the Ilaiyaraaja-era nostalgia." Pinkvilla's review for the song "Oh Sita Hey Rama" stated "Bringing back memories of a vintage Ilayaraja SP Balasubrahmanyam's musical, this is a soothing melody that is a perfect song for lovers and will make you play the song on loop."

Outlook wrote "Vishal Chandrashekar's music, be it for the background score or for the songs, work big time. The songs in this film have considerable retention value and that credit must go entirely to Vishal. His background score is also apt." Firstpost-based critic Priyanka Sundar, called the music as "sweet and charming, just like the film which stops short of being a classic." Haricharan Pudipeddi of Hindustan Times wrote "The musical score by Vishal Chandrasekhar is the soul of the film and if not for the great tracks, this would’ve been a lifeless tale of love". After the film's release, Dulquer Salmaan praised Chandrashekhar for the compositions, calling him as the "heartbeat of Sita Ramam".
