= List of Telugu films of 2027 =

Upcoming films in the Telugu language

This is a list of Telugu-language films produced in Telugu cinema in India that are released/scheduled to be released in 2027.

== January – March ==
Opening		Title	Director	Cast	Production company	Ref.
J A N U A R Y	8	Mahakāli	Puja Aparna Kolluru	Akshaye Khanna, Sriya Reddy, Bhoomi Shetty, Rohit Saraf, Rakesh Bedi	RKD Studios	
J A N U A R Y	13	Kaaka	Bobby Kolli	Chiranjeevi, Anaswara Rajan, Nivetha Pethuraj, Priyamani, Sunil, Getup Srinu	KVN Productions	
J A N U A R Y	14	SVC64	Hasith Goli	Ravi Teja, Sree Vishnu, Malavika Mohanan, Aishwarya Rajesh	Sri Venkateswara Creations	
F E B R U A R Y	–	Lord Gaaga	Sunil Kumar YK	Shoonya, Muki Regunathan, Swaroopinii, Disha Shetty	Zero Gravity Films	
M A R C H	5	Yellamma	Venu Yeldandi	Devi Sri Prasad	Sri Venkateswara Creations	
M A R C H	19	Fauzi	Hanu Raghavapudi	Prabhas, Imanvi Esmail, Anupam Kher, Sajjad Delafrooz, Mithun Chakraborty	Mythri Movie Makers / T-Series Films	

== April–June ==
Opening		Title	Director	Cast	Production company	Ref.
A P R I L	7	Varanasi	S. S. Rajamouli	Mahesh Babu, Priyanka Chopra, Prithviraj Sukumaran	Sri Durga Arts / Showing Business	
J U N E	11	Dragon	Prashanth Neel	N. T. Rama Rao Jr., Rukmini Vasanth, Anil Kapoor, Biju Menon	Mythri Movie Makers / NTR Arts / T-Series	

== October–December ==
Opening		Title	Director	Cast	Production company	Ref.
O C T O B E R	29	Spirit	Sandeep Reddy Vanga	Prabhas, Triptii Dimri, Vivek Oberoi, Kanchana	T-Series / Bhadrakali Pictures	
D E C E M B E R	–	Raaka	Atlee	Allu Arjun, Deepika Padukone, Rashmika Mandanna, Janhvi Kapoor, Mrunal Thakur, Aishwarya Lekshmi, Ramya Krishnan, Jim Sarbh, Yogi Babu, Femina George, Naila Grewal	Sun Pictures	

== See also ==
- Lists of Telugu-language films
- List of Telugu films of 2026
