= Andhra King Taluka =

2025 Telugu film by . P. Mahesh Babu

- Theatrical release poster
- Directed by: Mahesh Babu P.
- Written by: Mahesh Babu P.
- Produced by: Naveen Yerneni; Y. Ravi Shankar; Bhushan Kumar
- Starring: Ram Pothineni; Upendra; Bhagyashri Borse
- Cinematography: Siddhartha Nuni; George C. Williams
- Edited by: A. Sreekar Prasad
- Music by: Vivek–Mervin
- Production companies: Mythri Movie Makers; Super Cassettes Industries
- Release date: 27 November 2025
- Running time: 163 minutes
- Country: India
- Language: Telugu
- Box office: ₹32.50 crore

Andhra King Taluka is a 2025 Indian Telugu-language action comedy-drama film written and directed by Mahesh Babu P. Produced by Naveen Yerneni and Y. Ravi Shankar under Mythri Movie Makers, in association with T-Series, the film stars Ram Pothineni, Upendra and Bhagyashri Borse.

Music for the film was composed by the musical duo Vivek–Mervin, in their debut in Telugu cinema. Cinematography handled by Siddhartha Nuni and editing by A. Sreekar Prasad.

Andhra King Taluka was released on 27 November 2025 in theatres. The film received positive reviews from critics and audiences, who praised the lead pair's performances, direction, and music, but criticised the lengthy runtime. Despite the positive reviews, the film flopped at the box office, grossing over only ₹32.50 crore worldwide. Despite its failure at the box office the film gained an overwhelmingly positive response from OTT audience.

== Plot ==
A heartfelt tribute to fan culture, the story follows Sagar, an ardent fan whose life, relationships, and identity revolve around his admiration for his cinematic idol, "Andhra King" Surya Kumar.

In 2000s, the successful commercial actor, Surya Kumar, fondly known as "Andhra King", is acting in his landmark 100th film. But the producer, due to his repeated financial losses, opts out of producing the film. This makes Surya worry that his 100th film may be shelved, which would cause a downfall in his career.

He later approaches another producer, Nayak, who worked with Surya for his past films marking many blockbusters, asked him for ₹ 3 crores, which would suffice to produce the film. To loan him the money, Nayak forces Surya to act in a supporting role in which Nayak launches his son as the lead actor with Surya playing his father-which he had never done before. Surya decides to sell his house and assets for continuing production for his stopped film. But he couldn't tolerate the sadness of selling his house, built with the money made by his acting skills.

Before he could meet Nayak, he comes to know that someone has deposited ₹ 3 crores in his account. This makes him shocked and pushes him to find the person, calls up Anji, Ex-President and Founder of "Andhra King Fans Association" — Rajahmundry. It is revealed that the money was deposited by Sagar, the current president of the "Andhra King Fans Association". Then, Anji notes that he knows Sagar personally and would help Surya to contact his die-hard fan.

Upon this, a flashback arises in Sagar's childhood, where he is in the theatre to buy FDFS tickets for Surya's newly released film at that time. His father, trying to find ticket-sellers, meets Anji, who had many tickets but only given to real fans of Surya who had also decorated the theatre with cutouts and taglines of Surya. Finding that this was the only way to obtain tickets, Sagar immediately runs out to engrave his shirt as "ANDHRA KING" and ties the shirt on a cut-out of Surya. Ever since, the tagline "Andhra King" was used for Surya.

Knowing that Sagar was a fan of him since a while, decided to go on and visit him and wonders how he could give Surya such a large sum of money.

On the way, they stop at a small tea shop where the news reads: Eshwar, the journalist who wrote about Surya's career to be ended, was attacked by fans and they demanded an apology directly from Surya himself. Surya goes to the newspaper office and meets Eshwar. He asks Eshwar that being his fan, why is he writing negative news about him.

Turns out again, Eshwar was a close friend of Sagar and goes on to explain how he had begun his journey as being a fan of Surya. Sagar falls in love with Mahalakshmi. One day in a theatre, they both end up kissing each other which was seen by Purushottam, Mahalakshmi's father. This enrages him and beats up Sagar with his people inside the theatre. Sagar feels insulted and challenges Purushottam that he will build a theatre at his village, which is a flood-prone place and will open it. He tells this to Eshwar, who berates him for doing so. He leaves Sagar and goes to a far-off place and works as a journalist. Eshwar replies to Surya that this news is intended to Sagar which is an attempt to bring him to reality.

Sagar successfully constructs a theatre at his hometown and makes everything ready to open it on the release date of Surya's hundredth film. He sells the theatre to Mahalakshmi's father for 3 crores so that he could deposit that in Surya's account. This upsets Mahalakshmi, who had hopes on him and decides to marry someone else. Surya reaches the wedding hall and convinces Mahalakshmi to reunite with Sagar as a person like him would not betray her. Surya thinks of meeting Sagar but is stopped by the boat operator due to heavy rains. He insists on taking him there where on the other hand the village is flooded. Sagar takes all his people to the theatre he has constructed. Surya meets Sagar and this becomes a fanboy moment for him.

The movie ends with Surya's hundredth film having the highest first-day gross at Sagar's Mahalakshmi theatre.

== Cast ==
- Upendra as "Andhra King" Surya Kumar
- Ram Pothineni as Sagar P
- Bhagyashri Borse as Mahalakshmi
- Sindhu Tolani as Surya's wife
- Rahul Ramakrishna as Eshwar, Sagar's best friend
- Rao Ramesh as Simhadri, Sagar's father
- Tulasi as Sagar's mother
- Murali Sharma as Puchakayyala Veera Venkata Satyanarayana Purushottam, Mahalakshmi's father
- Rajashree as Mahalakshmi's mother
- Rajeev Kanakala as Surya's Manager
- Siva Reddy as Anji
- Satya as Chanti, the theatre operator
- Posani Krishna Murali as Minister
- VTV Ganesh as Collector
- Raghu Babu as a film producer
- Harsha Vardhan as College Principal
- Azhagam Perumal as Naayak (Film Producer)
- Kalyan Subrahmanyam as Mahalakshmi’s brother
- Ananth as Bank Manager
- Vadlamani Srinivas as School teacher
- Yazurved Gurram as Sagar’s rival
- Sravan

== Production ==
=== Development ===
On 12 October 2024, Ram Pothineni announced his next film, tentatively titled RAPO22 with director Mahesh Babu Pachigolla who made Miss Shetty Mr Polishetty (2023).

On 20 November 2024, Mythri Movie Makers officially announced Bhagyashri Borse as the female lead, marking her second Telugu film after Mr. Bachchan (2024). On 12 May 2025, The makers of the film revealed the first-look of Upendra, marking his return to Telugu cinema after Ghani. On 25 November 2024, music composer duo Vivek–Mervin were announced to be on board, marking their debut in Telugu cinema.

=== Filming ===
The film was officially launched with a muhurtham on 21 November 2024 in Hyderabad. The launch event was attended by Gopichand Malineni, Hanu Raghavapudi, Venky Kudumula and other notable guests. Gopichand Malineni switched on the camera, Hanu Raghavapudi gave the first clap, and Venky Kudumula directed the inaugural shot, which featured Ram Pothineni alongside lead actress Bhagyashri Borse in a traditional muhurat scene.

The official Principal photography of the film was commenced from 6 December 2024 in Hyderabad On the same day, the first look of the film featuring Ram Pothineni was also released. The next schedule of the film wrapped up after a 34-day non-stop shoot in Rajamahendravaram, during which Andhra Pradesh Cinematography Minister Kandula Durgesh visited the set.

The final schedule of the film commenced in Hyderabad, and was expected to continue for ten days. Following this, the team planned to shoot key daytime sequences, including the film's climax, over the next 20 days. Upon completion of this schedule, the principal photography was set to be wrapped up. On 1 November 2025, the Principal photography wrapped up.

== Music ==
The soundtrack album and background score were composed by Vivek–Mervin, marking their Telugu debut. The music rights were acquired by T-Series (company). On 18 July 2025, the first single "Nuvvunte Chaley" was released, the song lyrics was written by Ram Pothineni, marking his debut as lyricist and sung by Anirudh Ravichander. The second single “Puppy Shame” is released on 8 September 2025, with the lyrics by Bhaskarabhatla and vocals by Ram Pothineni. On 31 October 2025, the third single "Chinni Gundelo" is released, with the lyrics Krishna Kanth and vocals by Mervin Solomon and Satya Yamini.

Andhra King Taluka track listing
No.	Title	Lyrics	Singer(s)	Length
1.	"Untold Emotions"	Chandrabose	Swarag Keerthan	4:35
2.	"First Day First Show"	Dinesh Kakkerla	"Andhra King Taluka" Fans	2:59
3.	"Puppy Shame"	Bhaskarabhatla	Ram Pothineni	3:26
4.	"Nuvvunte Chaley"	Ram Pothineni	Anirudh Ravichander	4:00
5.	"Chinni Gundelo"	Krishna Kanth	Mervin Solomon, Satya Yamini	2:54
6.	"Chalu"	Chandrabose	Vivek Siva, Vishal Dadlani	4:36
7.	"Padu Padu"	Chandrabose	Ram Pothineni	2:01
Total length:				24:31

== Release ==
=== Theatrical ===
Andhra King Taluka was theatrically released on 27 November 2025. Earlier it was scheduled to release on 28 November 2025 but it was pre-poned one day before the actual date.

=== Home media ===
The digital streaming rights to the film were acquired by Netflix where it began streaming on 25 December 2025.
