= Fauzi (film) =

Upcoming Indian film by Hanu Raghavapudi

- Theatrical release poster
- Directed by: Hanu Raghavapudi
- Written by: Hanu Raghavapudi
- Produced by: Bhushan Kumar; Y. Ravi Shankar; Naveen Yerneni
- Starring: Prabhas; Imanvi Esmail; Anupam Kher; Sajjad Delafrooz; Mithun Chakraborty
- Cinematography: Sudeep Chatterjee
- Edited by: Kotagiri Venkateswara Rao
- Music by: Vishal Chandrashekhar
- Production companies: Mythri Movie Makers; T-Series Films
- Distributed by: see below
- Release date: 19 March 2027
- Country: India
- Language: Telugu
- Budget: ₹500–700 crore (Note: NTV Telugu reported the budget between ₹500–600 crore. The Times of India and ABP News reported a budget of ₹600 crore. The Week reported the budget between ₹600 to ₹700 crore.)

Fauzi is an upcoming Indian Telugu-language period war action drama film written and directed by Hanu Raghavapudi and produced by Bhushan Kumar, Y. Ravi Shankar, and Naveen Yerneni under the banner of Mythri Movie Makers and T-Series Films. The film stars Prabhas in the titular role alongside Imanvi Esmail, Anupam Kher, Sajjad Delafrooz and Mithun Chakraborty. Set during 1942, it focuses on the spy Fauzi fighting for the Azad Hind Army during World War Two. The film was composed by Vishal Chandrashekhar, cinematography handed by Sudeep Chatterjee and editing by Kotagiri Venkateswara Rao. Fauzi is scheduled to theatrical release on 19 March 2027.

== Cast ==
- Prabhas as Fauzi, an espionage spy for Azad Hind Army.
- Imanvi Esmail
- Anupam Kher
- Sajjad Delafrooz
- Mithun Chakraborty
- Subodh Bhave as Netaji Subhash Chandra Bose
- Jaya Prada
- Chaithra J. Achar
- Deepak Antani as Mahatma Gandhi
- Rajesh Sharma
- Iain Fletcher as Adolf Hitler
- Jitin Gulati
- Rahul Ravindran
- Bhanu Chander
- Praveen Dachara

== Production ==
=== Development ===
Following the success of Sita Ramam (2022), director Hanu Raghavapudi launched the new project with Prabhas in the lead role on 17 August 2024, under the tentative title as PrabhasHanu. The project began with puja ceremony in Hyderabad the same day. The film's title as Fauzi was revealed on 23 October 2025, coinciding with Prabhas' 46th birthday. The film marks Prabhas' return to period drama after Baahubali. In November 2025, it was decided by the makers that the film will be released in two parts followed by a prequel. The VFX works are supervised by RC Kamalakannan, while Prem Rakshith served as the choreographer and Sudeep Chatterjee was the cinematographer.

Made with an estimated budget of ₹500–₹700 crore, Fauzi is one of the most expensive Telugu film.

=== Casting ===
Prabhas plays lead in the titular role, a soldier/spy of the Azad Hind Fauj in the film. Debutant Imanvi Esmail was finalised as female protagonist. Sajjad Delafrooz was confirmed to play as the lead antagonist marking his Telugu film debut. Anupam Kher's cast was confirmed by the makers on 7 March 2026. Mithun Chakraborty and Jaya Prada joined the cast the August 2024. Kannada actress Chaithra J Achar also joined the cast marking her Telugu film debut.

=== Filming ===
Principal photography commenced in 24 August 2024 in Madurai. In February 2026, Prabhas sustained minor injury while performing a horse-riding sequence. In April 2026, the makers announced that 80% of shooting of the film was completed. On 5 May 2026, six crew members met a road accident near Abdullapurmet while they were on way to Ramoji Film City for a shoot, in which one died on spot and five other injured. Filming was temporarily halted following the accident. Another break in shooting was taken till 15 September, leaving around 20 days of shooting Prabhas' part. During the shooting Rajesh Sharma was hosptilised following insect bite.

In mid-August, Prabhas' unit moved to Aluminium Factory for filming. For shooting purpose a Japanese Army camp of the World War II era was recreated at Ramoji Film City.

== Music ==
The film's soundtrack and background score was composed by Vishal Chandrashekhar, fourth collaboration with Hanu and first collaboration with Prabhas. while Krishna Kanth penned the lyrics.

== Marketing ==
The first look poster was released on 23 October 2025, coinciding with Prabhas' 46th birthday, revealing film's title. The second look poster was released on 16 July 2026. The teaser, titled "File no.25: Fauzi" was released on 23 October 2026, coinciding with Prabhas' 47th birthday.

== Release ==
=== Theatrical ===
Fauzi is scheduled to theatrical release on 19 March 2027 in original Telugu language, the film's was also release in Hindi, Tamil, Kannada, Malayalam and English languages. Initially, the film was originally scheduled release on 3 December 2026. However, on 21 September 2026, during the pre-release event of Nani's The Paradise, producer of Mythri Movie Makers Ravi Shankar confirmed that the release of Fauzi "is being pushed back slightly."

=== Distribution ===
AA Films acquired the Hindi version release rights for ₹60 crore.

=== Home media ===
Netflix acquired the post-theatrical digital streaming rights for a price of ₹180 crore.
