= Shatru (actor) =

Indian film actor

- Born: M. Ramakrishna; 6 August 1984 (age 42); Sarla, Odisha, India
- Education: Ravenshaw University, Cuttack
- Occupation: Actor
- Years active: 2010–present
- Spouse: Vinoothna

M. Ramakrishna (born 6 August 1984), known professionally as Shatru, is an Indian actor who appears and works predominantly in Telugu and Tamil films. He is best known for his roles in the films Krishna Gaadi Veera Prema Gaadha (2016), Rangasthalam (2018), Kadaikutty Singam (2018), and Pushpa: The Rise (2021).

== Early life and career ==
Ramakrishna was born into a Telugu-speaking family to M. Satyanarayana and M. Sarojini Devi in the Sarla village of the Bargarh district in Odisha. He completed a Bachelor's degree in microbiology from Ravenshaw University. Ramakrishna later moved to Hyderabad to pursue his acting career. After starring in several films in brief roles, including Leader (2010), Shatru had a breakthrough for his portrayal of Ramaraju in Krishna Gaadi Veera Prema Gaadha (2016). Shatru debuted in Tamil cinema with Kathakali (2016) before starring in Kadaikutty Singam (2018) where he played the antagonist. In a review of the film by the Deccan Chronicle, the reviewer wrote that "Telugu actor Shatru plays the villain and is suited for the role".

== Filmography ==
=== Telugu films ===
Year	Title	Role	Notes and Ref.
2010	Leader	Archana's assistant	
2011	Solo		
2013	Alias Janaki	Mysa	
2013	Attarintiki Daredi	Prameela's kidnapper	
2014	Love You Bangaram	Nag	
2014	Legend	Police Officer	
2014	Aagadu	Durga	
2015	Subramanyam for Sale	Bala	
2015	Loafer	Rama's henchman	
2016	Krishna Gaadi Veera Prema Gaadha	Ramaraju	
2016	Eedu Gold Ehe		
2016	Ism	Javed Bhai's henchmen	
2017	Mister	Shatru	
2017	Baahubali 2: The Conclusion	Pindaari tribal leader	
2017	Duvvada Jagannadham	Badda Stephen Prakash	
2017	Veedevadu	James	
2017	Jai Lava Kusa	Jai's henchmen	
2017	Raju Gari Gadhi 2	Goon	
2017	PSV Garuda Vega	Yakub Ali	
2018	Rangasthalam	Kasi	
2018	Bharat Ane Nenu	Jagadish	
2018	Sailaja Reddy Alludu	Rival of Shailaja Reddy	
2018	Aravinda Sametha Veera Raghava	Subbadu	
2018	Padi Padi Leche Manasu	Dhanraj Pillai's henchman	
2019	Kalki	Perumaallu	
2019	Gaddalakonda Ganesh	Kasi	
2019	George Reddy	Kishan Singh	
2020	World Famous Lover	Patnaik	
2021	Akshara	Police officer	
2021	Lakshya	Rahul	
2021	Pushpa: The Rise	DSP Govindappa	
2022	Bheemla Nayak	Nagaraju's assistant	
2022	Acharya	Khilla	
2022	Sita Ramam	Lieutenant Vikas	
2022	Yashoda	Rishi IPS	
2022	Sivudu		
2022	Top Gear	ACP Vikram	
2022	Korameenu	Meesala Raju	
2023	Ugram	Victor	
2023	Narakasura	Keshava	
2023	Vairam		
2023	Ala Ninnu Cheri		
2024	Devaki Nandana Vasudeva	Ranga	
2025	Pothugadda	Madduri Bhaskar	
2025	Uppu Kappurambu	Madhubabu	
2025	Karmanye Vadhikaraste	Arjun Prasad	
2026	Lenin	Tulasi	
2027	Dragon		

=== Tamil films ===
Year	Title	Role
2016	Kathakali	Thamba's brother-in-law
2018	Kadaikutty Singam	Kodiyarasu
2022	Theal	Paulraj
2022	Veerapandiyapuram	Karthi
2022	Pattathu Arasan	Sadagoppan
2022	Gatta Kusthi	Lokesh
2023	Chandramukhi 2	Vettaiyan Raja

=== Other language films ===
Year	Title	Role	Language
2019	Rustum	Banty Yadav	Kannada
2026	Pallichattambi	Rairu Ramanna	Malayalam

=== Television ===
Year	Title	Role	Network	Ref.
2021	11th Hour	Rajvardhan Rathore	Aha	
2025	Mayasabha	Vakada Mahesh	SonyLIV	
