= My Name Is Shruthi =

- Release poster
- Directed by: Srinivas Omkhar
- Produced by: Ramya Prabhakar; Nagendra Raju
- Starring: Hansika Motwani
- Cinematography: Kishore Boyidapu
- Edited by: Chota K. Prasad
- Music by: Mark. K. Robin
- Release date: 17 November 2023
- Running time: 130 minutes
- Country: India
- Language: Telugu

My Name Is Shruthi is a 2023 Indian Telugu-language drama thriller film directed by Srinivas Omkhar and starring Hansika Motwani.

== Cast ==
- Hansika as Shruthi
- Sai Tej as Charan
- Prema as Dr. Kiranmayi
- Murali Sharma as ACP Ranjith
- Pooja Ramachandran as Anu
- Raja Ravindra as Home Minister V. Prathap Reddy
- Praveen as Bhabhi
- Aadukalam Naren as MLA Gurumurthy
- Jayaprakash as DGP
- C. V. L. Narasimha Rao as Shruthi's grandfather
- Dayanand Reddy as Yaadi
- Appaji Ambarisha Darbha as Businessman
- Vinodhini Vaidyanathan as Shruthi's mother

== Soundtrack ==
The soundtrack of the film was composed by Mark. K. Robin.

All lyrics are written by Krishna Kanth.

Track listing
No.	Title	Singer(s)	Length
1.	"Poraatam Poraatam"	Rahul Sipligunj	3:31
2.	"Merisele Merisele"	Satya Yamini	3:34
3.	"Reppe Vese Laaga"	Harika Narayan	4:00
Total length:			11:05

== Reception ==
A critic from OTTplay gave the film 2.5/5 stars and wrote "My Name is Shruthi has a very interesting backdrop of skin mafia. The initial portions are boring, and unnecessary characters deviate from the proceedings. But once the second half starts, the film has multiple thrills that hold our attention till the end and make this film a passable watch this weekend".

=== Streaming rights ===
The streaming rights of this movie were acquired by Amazon Prime Video on 29 December 2023, and in Aha on 28 February 2024, and also in Lionsgate Play on 21 March 2025.
