= Bachchala Malli =

2024 Indian Telugu film by Subbu Mangadevvi

- Theatrical release poster
- Directed by: Subbu Mangadevvi
- Written by: Subbu Mangadevvi
- Screenplay by: Vipparthi Madhu; Viswanetra
- Story by: Subbu Mangadevi
- Produced by: Razesh Danda; Balaji Gutta
- Starring: Allari Naresh; Amritha Aiyer
- Cinematography: Richard M. Nathan
- Edited by: Chota K. Prasad
- Music by: Vishal Chandrasekhar
- Production company: Hasya Movies
- Release date: 20 December 2024
- Country: India
- Language: Telugu

Bachchala Malli is a 2024 Indian Telugu-language period drama film written and directed by Subbu Mangadevvi, and produced by Razesh Danda and Balaji Gutta through Hasya Movies. The film stars Allari Naresh and Amritha Aiyer in the lead roles, while Rao Ramesh, Kota Jayaram, and Rohini play supporting roles. The music was composed by Vishal Chandrasekhar with cinematography by Richard M. Nathan and editing by Chota K. Prasad. The film was released on 20 December 2024 and opened to mixed reviews from critics.

== Plot ==
In 2005, Bachhala Malli is a troubled village ruffian known for his violent temper and self-destructive habits, including heavy drinking and smoking. He earns a living by stitching jute bags and is feared by everyone. One night after leaving a bar in a drunken state, Malli collapses while trying to start his motorcycle and loses consciousness.

The narrative shifts to 1985, revealing Malli's past as a bright student who topped his district in his 10th-grade examinations. He shared a close bond with his father, Bachhala Satyanarayana, a businessman who secretly maintained a second relationship with Padma. When Padma threatens suicide unless Satyanarayana commits to her, Satyanarayana's father issues an ultimatum forcing Satyanarayana to choose between his family and Padma. Satyanarayana chooses Padma and leaves the household, an event Malli witnesses as a child. Traumatized by what he perceives as abandonment, Malli rejects his father completely. Around the same time, he began smoking and was later expelled from college after refusing to bring his father when reprimanded by authorities. Over the years, this emotional rupture turns Malli into a rebellious and bitter man.

In the 1990s, Malli returns home, where his mother reveals that Satyanarayana, filled with regret, has bought land in Malli's name. Malli angrily refuses the gesture and continues to harbor resentment. At Malli's niece Rajyam's wedding, Malli meets Kaveri, a student, and falls in love with her. He confesses his flaws and promises to give up his vices if she asks him to. Though initially frightened by his aggressive nature, Kaveri gradually recognizes his sincerity. She demands that he quit drinking and smoking, which he does. However, she later asks Malli to help her elope with her classmate Aravind, fearing opposition from Aravind's family. Malli reluctantly agrees, but at the railway station, Aravind leaves alone, having convinced Kaveri that Malli's love for her is genuine. Kaveri chooses Malli.

Soon after, Malli is caught in a police raid at a brothel, where a friend had taken him. During the chaos, Malli assaults an officer, drawing the wrath of Kaveri's father, a police officer, who has him detained. Satyanarayana pleads for Malli's release, but Malli refuses to acknowledge him as his father. Satyanarayana later dies, and Malli refuses to attend the funeral or perform the last rites, further deepening family fractures.

A 1995 flashback reveals Malli's attempt to start a gunny bag business without joining the village union controlled by Ganapathi Raju, the village president. Raju violently opposes him, but Malli resists. When Malli's godown is destroyed, he vows to rebuild it. Kaveri supports him by giving her mother's ring to sell. When Kaveri's father agrees to their marriage on the condition that Satyanarayana's name appear on the wedding card, Malli explodes in anger and walks away, refusing reconciliation. Kaveri eventually agrees to an arranged marriage, while Malli relapses into alcoholism.

In the present, Malli wakes in the hospital to learn that his stepbrother Ramana had attempted to kill him. His mother confronts him, telling him that his stubborn pride has destroyed his life and urging him to let go of his hatred. Malli later attends Kaveri's wedding in a drunken state, intending to return the ring. Instead, he discovers that Kaveri has taken her own life. Soon after, Raju's men attack Malli, leaving Raju himself paralyzed in the aftermath.

Haunted and broken, Malli confronts Kaveri's father and admits his failures. The grieving father tells Malli that neither of them can escape the pain they share. In Malli's final moments, he retreats to a temple, reflecting on his wasted life. When his family later comes searching for him, they find that he has died.

== Cast ==
- Allari Naresh as Bachhala Malli
  - Harsh Roshan as young Malli
- Amritha Aiyer as Kaveri
- Rao Ramesh as Kaveri's father
- Kota Jayaram as Bachchala Satyanarayana, Malli's father
- Rohini as Malli's mother
- Hari Teja as Rajyam, Malli's niece
- Praveen as Rajyam's husband
- Manichandana as Padma, Satyanarayana's second wife
- Ankith Koyya as Bachchala Ramana, Malli's stepbrother
- Achyuth Kumar as Ganapathi Raju
- Harsha Chemudu as Raghava
- Dhanraj
- Prasad Behara as Malli’s friend
- Srinivas Gavireddy as Malli’s friend
- Inaya Sultana
- Kishore Kumar Polimera

== Production ==
The first glimpse of the film was released on Allari Naresh's birthday, revealing the film's rustic tone and action-packed visuals.

Subbu Mangadevi, who gained acclaim for his directorial debut Solo Brathuke So Better, wrote and directed the new-age action drama. The screenplay was co-written by Vipparthi Madhu and Viswanetra, with dialogues and story by Subbu himself.

The film was shot in Annavaram and Tuni.

== Music ==
The film's music is composed by Vishal Chandrashekhar. The first single, "Maa Oori Jatharalo", a folk melody blending traditional and contemporary elements, was released in July 2024.

All music is composed by Vishal Chandrashekhar.

No.	Title	Lyrics	Singer(s)	Length
1.	"Maa Oori Jatharalo"	Sri Mani	Gowra Hari, Sinduri Vishal	3:46
2.	"Ade Nenu Asalu Lenu"	Krishna Kanth	S. P. Charan, Ramya Behara	3:51
3.	"Mari Antha Kopam"	Poorna Chary	Sai Vignesh	4:41

== Release ==
Bachhala Malli was released on 20 December 2024, coinciding with Christmas.

== Reception ==
=== Critical reception ===
B. H. Harsh of The New Indian Express praised the performances of Allari Naresh, Hari Teja, Rao Ramesh, and Rohini, as well as the music and cinematography, but criticised the screenplay for its inability to establish a convincing foundation for the conflicts and its lack of depth in portraying the world around Malli. Srivathsan Nadadhur of The Hindu wrote, "Bachchala Malli makes for a tedious watch, not even providing the comfort of a satisfactory resolution. Like Malli, you feel exhausted and hopeless."

=== Box Office ===
The film got mixed reviews from the viewers and earned Rs 3.6 crores at the box office
