= PSV Garuda Vega =

- Theatrical release poster
- Directed by: Praveen Sattaru
- Screenplay by: Praveen Sattaru
- Story by: Praveen Sattaru; Niranjan Reddy
- Produced by: M Koteswara Raju
- Starring: Rajasekhar; Pooja Kumar; Thrigun; Shraddha Das; Kishore
- Cinematography: Anji; Suresh Ragutu; Shyam Prasad; Gika Chelidze; Bakur Chikobava
- Edited by: Dharmendra Kakarala
- Music by: Songs: Bheems Ceciroleo; Sricharan Pakala; Score: Sricharan Pakala
- Production company: Jyo Star Enterprises
- Distributed by: Shivani Shivatmika Movies, Wall Poster Cinema (Overseas)
- Release date: 3 November 2017
- Running time: 158 minutes
- Country: India
- Language: Telugu
- Box office: ₹35.9 crore

PSV Garuda Vega (Note: This is the name of the ship featured in the film, with PSV standing for Private Security Vehicle.) is a 2017 Indian Telugu-language action spy film written and directed by Praveen Sattaru. The film is produced by M. Koteswara Raju and stars Rajasekhar, Pooja Kumar, Thrigun, Shraddha Das, and Kishore, while Sanjay Reddy, Nassar, Ali, Posani Krishna Murali, and Sayaji Shinde play supporting roles.

PSV Garuda Vega was released worldwide on 3 November 2017 to positive reviews from critics, was successful at the box office, grossing over ₹35.9 crore.

== Plot ==
Niranjan Iyer, a hacker, makes a deal for confidential information worth ₹10 crore (US$1.0 million) with an unknown person. When he confirms the deal, someone chases after him, but Niranjan manages to escape. Pullela Chandrasekhar, an ACP of the NIA and his wife Swathi, consult a divorce lawyer. Swathi accuses Shekhar of neglecting her and their son and only focusing on his work. Shekhar gets into a car crash when he returns to his office. He finds a high range gun in the other car, which is rare in India, and the other car's owner escapes by shooting Shekhar.

Shekhar decides to arrest the car owner and orders his assistant to check traffic signal CCTV footage to find him. He discovers that the owner is the seasoned assassin Yakub Ali. Shekhar and his team interrogate him, but learn nothing; they decide to bring him to court, but Ali dies on the way, where his phone receives a message, which displays three codes. Having solved the code, Shekhar and his team learn that the codes describe a bomb placed in Charminar and set to explode at 8:00 AM, in just a few hours, and also learns in the investigation, that the opposition leader of the state, Pratap Reddy, is going on a rally against the current government, and they conclude that the bomb is placed to kill Reddy.

Shekhar finds the bomb in an underhole and immediately informs the bomb squad, but they inform him that it is a remote-controlled bomb and that the remote must be used to detonate the bomb, in the vicinity. Shekhar searches for the remote, but to no avail. After Shekhar captures a suspicious man, the latter reveals that the remote is in a white colored-van, being operated by the terrorists. He shoots at the van with the other police officers and kills them. Shekhar finds Niranjan in the crowd, and chases after him, where he successfully arrests him. In custody, Niranjan manages to sell the drive containing the secret information for ₹25 crore (US$2.6 million) to Reddy's secretary. After arresting him, Shekhar's senior officer is informed by the government that Shekhar has been assigned to transfer Niranjan to Nagpur.

When Shekhar and Niranjan arrive in Nagpur, a gang attacks them, which forces their van into the river and shoot at them. Shekhar saves Niranjan and leaves towards the forest, where Niranjan reveals that the success of Pokhran Fire testing in 1998 made India to keep its uranium reserves protected from other countries, for future use. The head of the Atomic Department of India, hired four hackers, which include Niranjan, Vishal and two other people, to replace the current photos of their uranium reserves with older photos, so that satellites from other countries cannot see their wealth. They successfully hacked and then left the place. However, Vishal bugged the Indian database of the DAE and learned that a uranium mine in Andhra Pradesh has the highest quantity of uranium in the country.

The head of the DAE has dealt with the MLA of the district and several other ministers, and the hackers were used to hack the satellites to cover up evidence of uranium smuggling. Vishal blackmailed the head of the DAE for ₹10 crore (US$1.0 million), but was killed. Niranjan took the drive and sold it to Reddy's secretary as he would expose the scandal, but Reddy made a deal with the MLA. After the revelation, Shekhar kills the mercenaries sent to kill them and manages to track the location of the main suspect George.

Shekhar and Niranjan leave to meet George to find the data on a remote server of the DAE, but are captured. They are left tied, along with Swathi, on the remote server ship, rigged with explosives to kill them. Shekhar and Niranjan manage to escape and detach the explosives on their ship. They shoot the explosives onto George's ship, by using a leaking high pressurized steam pipe, and successfully kill him and the smugglers. The MLA and several other officers of the scandal are exposed and arrested.

== Cast ==
- Rajasekhar as Pullela Chandrashekhar "Shekhar"
- Pooja Kumar as Swathi
- Thrigun as Niranjan Iyer
- Shraddha Das as Malini
- Kishore as George
- Sanjay Reddy as Ex-Intelligence Officer and Analyst
- Nassar as NIA Head
- Ali as Lawyer
- Posani Krishna Murali as Opposition Leader Pratap Reddy
- Sayaji Shinde as Mining Minister
- Srinivas Avasarala as Prakash
- Charandeep as NIA Officer Venkat Rao
- Ravi Varma as NIA Officer Yadav
- Pruthviraj as Doctor
- Shatru as Yakub Ali
- Sanjay Swaroop as Ravi Naik
- Aadarsh Balakrishna as George's Gang Member
- Sunny Leone - special appearance in the song "Deo Deo"

== Soundtrack ==
Soundtrack was composed by Bheems Ceciroleo and Sricharan Pakala.

Track list
No.	Title	Lyrics	Music	Singer(s)	Length
1.	"Deo Deo"	Bhaskara Batla	Bheems Ceciroleo	Geetha Madhuri, Raghu Ram, Bheems Ceciroleo	3:46
2.	"Premale"	Krishna Kanth	Sricharan Pakala	Shakthisree Gopalan, LV Revanth	3:20
Total length:					7:16

== Controversy ==
On 12 April 2018, Hyderabad city civil court forbade the film producers, directors, and YouTube from screening this movie. The court passed this interim order as a city-based uranium company filed a complaint against the film, claiming that it shows the corporation in a bad light.
