= Filmfare Critics Award for Best Film – Telugu =

The Filmfare Critics Award for Best Film – Telugu is given by the Filmfare magazine as part of its annual Filmfare Awards South for South Indian films. It was first awarded at the 58th Annual Filmfare Awards in 2010. It acknowledges an encourages the filmmakers of a direction department. The award was given only once in 2011. Since 2022, it became regular in all the four languages.

== Winners ==
| Year | Film | Director(s) | Refs |
|---|---|---|---|
| 2010 | Prasthanam | Deva Katta | |
| 2022 | Sita Ramam | Hanu Raghavapudi | |
| 2023 | Baby | Sai Rajesh | |
| 2024 | Lucky Baskhar | Venky Atluri | |
