= Pothugadda =

2025 Indian Telugu-language film by Raksha Veeram

- Release poster
- Directed by: Raksha Veeram
- Written by: Raksha Veeram
- Produced by: Anupama Chandra Koduri; G. Sharath Chandra Reddy
- Starring: Shatru; Aadukalam Naren; Prudhvi Dandamudi; Vismaya Sri
- Cinematography: Rahul Shrivatsav
- Edited by: SJ Shivakiran
- Music by: Score; Marcus M Songs; Shravan Bharadwaj
- Production company: 24 Cinema Street
- Distributed by: ETV Win
- Release date: 30 January 2025
- Running time: 111 minutes
- Country: India
- Language: Telugu

Pothugadda is a 2025 Indian Telugu-language political drama film written and directed by Raksha Veeram. The film portrays Shatru, Aadukalam Naren, Prudhvi Dandamudi and Vismaya Sri in the lead roles. Under the technical department, the film's cinematography was handled by Rahul Shrivatsav, the editing completed under SJ Shivakiran's leadership, whereas the songs and the background score were composed by Shravan Bharadwaj and Marcus M respectively.

The film was released on 30 January 2025 directly on the Indian over-the-top streaming service, ETV Win.

== Cast ==
- Shatru as Madduri Bhaskar
- Aadukalam Naren as MLA Samudra
- Prudhvi Dandamudi as Krishna
- Vismaya Sri as Geetha
- Prashant Karthi as Venkat
- Venky Lingam as Anji

== Release and reception ==
Pothugadda was originally scheduled for direct-to-video release on 14 November 2024 on ETV Win, but was subsequently released on 30 January 2025.

Avad Mohammad of OTTPlay gave a rating of 2 out of 5 and wrote that, "the lack of depth in the core emotional plot and tension in the proceedings makes it a routine thriller". Satya Pulagam of ABP Desam was critical about the story and screenplay.
