= Murali Sharma =

Indian actor (born 1972)

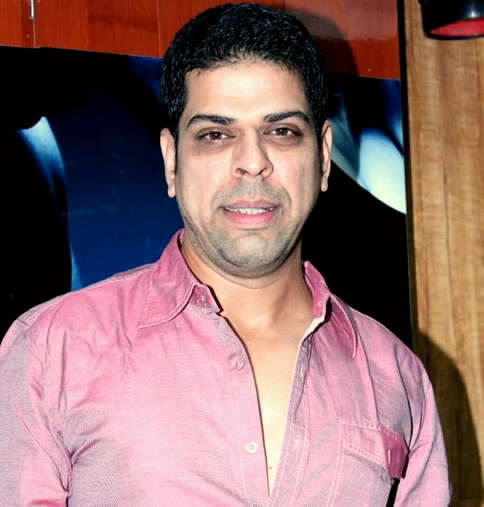
- Sharma in 2013
- Born: 9 August 1972 (age 54); Guntur, Andhra Pradesh, India
- Occupation: Actor
- Years active: 1996–present
- Spouse: Ashwini Kalsekar (m. 2009)

Murali Sharma (born 9 August 1972) is an Indian actor who works predominantly in Telugu and Hindi films. Sharma has starred in over 130 feature films including Telugu, Hindi, Tamil, Marathi, Kannada and Malayalam cinema.

Sharma gained wide recognition in television with Doordarshan's Paltan in which he plays the lead role of Col. R.S. Sajwan. Sharma has appeared in various soap operas such as Guns and Roses, Siddanth, Laagi Tujhse Lagan, Mahayagya, Viraasat, Zindhagi Teri Meri Kahani, Rishtey, Humne lee hain shapath, and Rangeela Ratan Sisodia.

== Early and personal life ==
Murali Sharma was born on 9 August 1972 in Guntur, Andhra Pradesh and was brought up in Mumbai. He completed his bachelor's degree, and studied acting at the Roshan Taneja Acting School in Mumbai. He is married to actress Ashwini Kalsekar.

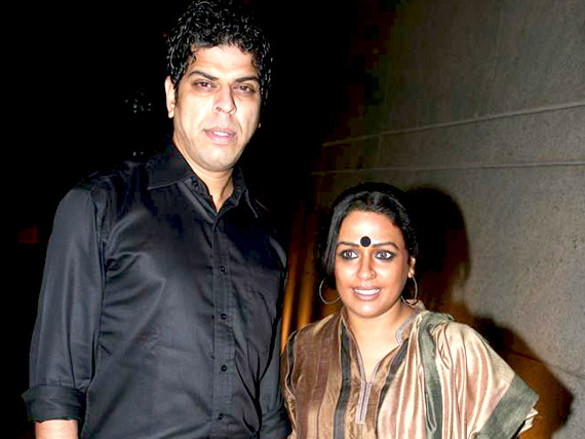
Sharma with his wife Ashwini Kalsekar at an event in 2014

== Career ==
Murli Sharma appeared as Captain Khan in the 2004 Bollywood movie Main Hoon Na alongside Shahrukh Khan. In 2007, he had roles in the Hindi movies Dhol, Dhamaal, Black Friday, and the Telugu movies Athidhi and Kantri. He received a Nandi Award for his dual role of Kaiser/Ajay Shastri in Athidhi. In 2008, he made an appearance in the Bollywood film Jaane Tu... Ya Jaane Na and appeared in Golmaal Returns and Sunday.

In 2011, Sharma had supporting roles in Singham, Oosaravelli, starring Jr. NTR and Dhoni in Telugu. He continued to work in Hindi and Telugu, and in 2012 he had his first role in a Malayalam film Karmayodha starring Mohanlal. In 2013 he also worked in the Tamil and Marathi film industries.

In 2015, he had larger roles in Gopala Gopala and Bhale Bhale Magadivoy. He also worked in Badlapur, ABCD 2, and the Tamil film Paayum Puli. In 2016, he appeared in Krishna Gaadi Veera Prema Gaadha, Savithri, Sanam Teri Kasam and Wazir. He also did main role in DJ: Duvvada Jagannadham (2017), in 2018 Agnyaathavaasi and Vijetha, in 2019 Saaho, in 2020 Ala Vaikunthapurramuloo, Sarileru Neekevvaru and Street Dancer 3D. He played role of Valmiki in the movie Ala Vaikunthapuramloo.

In 2021, he appeared in A1 Express, Sreekaram, Jathi Ratnalu and Chaavu Kaburu Challaga.

== Awards ==
He received the Nandi Award for Best Villain in 2007 for Athidhi. He also received the Filmfare Award South and SIIMA Award for Best Supporting Actor – Telugu for Ala Vaikunthapurramuloo in 2021. 'New Life Theological University' awarded Murali Sharma an honorary doctorate for his contributions to the welfare of society in 2021.

== Filmography ==
Key
†	Denotes films that have not yet been released

=== Telugu films ===
Year	Title	Role	Notes
2007	Athidhi	Qaiser / Ajay Sastry	Nandi Award for Best Villain
2008	Kantri	Gangster	
2011	Chattam	Sarath Chandra	
2011	Oosaravelli	Local Don	
2011	Dhoni	Ghani Bhai	
2012	Mr. Nookayya	Shajahan Bismil	
2012	Adhinayakudu	DGP	
2012	Krishnam Vande Jagadgurum	Reddappa	
2013	Platform No. 6		
2013	Ramachari	Commissioner Chaddha	
2014	Yevadu	ACP K. Ashok Verma IPS	
2015	Gopala Gopala	Akbar Bhai	
2015	Bhale Bhale Magadivoy	Panduranga Rao	
2016	Krishna Gaadi Veera Prema Gaadha	David Bhai	
2016	Savithri	Dora Babu	
2016	Sri Sri	J. K. Bharadwaj	
2016	Babu Bangaram	Commissioner	
2016	Aatadukundam Raa	Vijay Rao	
2016	Abhinetri	Dilip	
2016	Hyper	Gaja	
2016	Meelo Evaru Koteeswarudu	Priya's father	
2017	Dwaraka	Chaitanya	
2017	Mister	Sri Veera Narasimha Rayalu	
2017	DJ: Duvvada Jagannadham	Purushottam	
2017	Yuddham Sharanam	Jaidev "JD" Shastri	
2017	Ninnu Kori	Chandramouli (Pallavi's father)	
2017	London Babulu	Sharma	
2017	Prematho Mee Karthik	Karthik's father	
2018	Bhaagamathie	ACP Sampath	
2018	Agnyaathavaasi	Sharma	
2018	Touch Chesi Chudu	Police Commissioner	
2018	Awe	Magician Yogi	
2018	Juvva	CI Viswanath	
2018	Mehbooba	Afreen's father	
2018	Vijetha	K. Srinivas Rao	
2018	Happy Wedding	Akshara's father	
2018	Brand Babu	Diamond Babu's father	
2018	Shailaja Reddy Alludu	Chaitanya's father	
2018	Ee Maaya Peremito	Pramod Jain	
2018	Devadas	Police Officer Sharma	
2018	Padi Padi Leche Manasu	Prakash Cherukuri	
2019	NTR: Kathanayakudu	Aluri Chakrapani	
2019	Ranarangam	MLA Simhachalam	
2019	Saaho	David	
2019	Ninu Veedani Needanu Nene	Tharun	
2019	Evaru	Vinay Varma	
2019	Tenali Ramakrishna BA. BL	Chakravarthy	
2019	Prati Roju Pandage	Dhamodhar	
2020	Sarileru Neekevvaru	Army General	
2020	Ala Vaikunthapurramuloo	Valmiki	SIIMA Award for Best Supporting Actor – Telugu; Filmfare Award for Best Supporting Actor – Telugu
2020	HIT: The First Case	Ibrahim	
2021	Check	SP	
2021	A1 Express	Murali	
2021	Sreekaram	Chaitra's father	
2021	Jathi Ratnalu	Sports Minister Chanakya	
2021	Chaavu Kaburu Challaga	Sekhar Samuel	
2021	Paagal	MLA Raja Reddy "Raji"	
2021	Most Eligible Bachelor	Vibha's father	
2021	Varudu Kaavalenu	Bhoomi's father	
2021	Shyam Singha Roy	Lawyer Krishnamurthy	
2022	Radhe Shyam	Chakravarthy	Both films were simultaneously shot in Telugu and Hindi
2022	Major	Commander Shera Singh	Both films were simultaneously shot in Telugu and Hindi
2022	Khiladi	Puttaparthi	
2022	Bheemla Nayak	CI Kodanda Ram	
2022	Stand Up Rahul	Prakash	
2022	F3	Anand Prasad	
2022	Godfather	Narayana Verma	
2022	Sita Ramam	Subramanyam	
2022	Ori Devuda	Paulraj	
2022	Yashoda	Balram	
2023	Veera Simha Reddy	Jayaram	
2023	Mr. King	Seetha Rama Raju	
2023	Vinaro Bhagyamu Vishnu Katha	Sharma	
2023	Ravanasura	DIG Narasimha Murthy	
2023	Agent	P. Vittal Rao	
2023	Rangabali	Sahaja's father	
2023	Kushi	Chadarangam Srinivasa Rao	
2023	Miss Shetty Mr Polishetty	Polishetty Phanindra	
2023	Tiger Nageswara Rao	DSP Vishwanath Sastry	
2023	My Name Is Shruthi	ACP Ranjith	
2023	Kota Bommali PS	Minister Barisela Jayaraj	
2023	Jilebi	MLA Rudra Pratap Rana	
2024	Guntur Kaaram	Basavaraju Sarangapaani "Paani"	
2024	Chaari 111	Major Prasad Rao	
2024	Tillu Square	Sheikh Mehboob	
2024	Purushothamudu	Aditya Ram	
2024	Shivam Bhaje	Dr. Nishanth	
2024	Saripodhaa Sanivaaram	Koormanand	
2024	Devara: Part 1	Muruga	
2025	Mazaka	Bhargav Varma	
2025	Hari Hara Veera Mallu	Kasi Lingam	
2025	Mass Jathara	SI Rajaram	
2025	Andhra King Taluka	Purushottam	
2025	Champion	Sundarayya	
2026	Vishnu Vinyasam	Guruji	
2026	S Saraswathi	Sub-Inspector Krishna Reddy	
2026	Nagabandham: The Secret Treasure	Achyutha Chary	
2026	Aakasamlo Oka Tara	Shankar Narayan	

=== Hindi films ===
Year	Title	Role	Notes
2002	Dil Vil Pyar Vyar		
2002	Raaz	Inspector Saab	
2003	Maqbool	Devsare	
2003	Dhoop	Colonel Rathore	
2004	Main Hoon Na	Mr. Khan	
2004	Masti	Eunuch at band stand	
2004	Black Friday	Inspector Virendra Vani aka VV Vani	
2005	Karam	Kaif	
2005	Mangal Pandey: The Rising	Sheikh Paltu	
2005	Ek Khiladi Ek Haseena	Bakra (target)	
2005	Apaharan	Muralidhar	
2005	Kal: Yesterday and Tomorrow	Shekhar	
2005	Chocolate	Bilaal	
2006	Teesri Aankh: The Hidden Camera	Dinesh	
2006	The Memsahib	Kishore Thakkar	
2006	Rockin Meera	Prem Singh	
2006	Fight Club – Members Only	Police Inspector	
2006	Buddha Mar Gaya	Rohan Alexander	
2007	Dhamaal	Inspector Kulkarni (Crime Branch)	
2007	Dhol	Zicomo	
2007	Ek Dastak		
2007	Laaga Chunari Mein Daag	Sunil	
2008	Sunday	Mysterious Stalker	
2008	One Two Three	M. M. Munde	
2008	Jaane Tu... Ya Jaane Na	Airport Inspector	Special appearance
2008	Golmaal Returns	M. D. Sawant	
2009	Mere Khwabon Mein Jo Aaye	Concertgoer	
2009	Chal Chala Chal	Gajendra Singh	
2009	13B	Inspector Shiva Naik	Bilingual film; Hindi version
2010	Shaapit	Mr. Shekhawat (Kaaya's father)	
2010	Lamhaa	News Reporter	
2010	Dabangg	ACP Malik	
2010	Golmaal 3	Inspector Mohan Dande	
2010	Tees Maar Khan	Agent Mr. Mukherjee	
2011	Singham	DSP Satyam Patkar	
2011	Chatur Singh Two Star	Tony	
2012	Aalaap	Naxalite	
2012	Choron Ki Baraat		
2012	Jeena Hai Toh Thok Daal	Hanumant Singh	
2012	OMG – Oh My God!	Laxman Mishra	
2012	Chakravyuh	Naga	
2013	Policegiri	MLA	
2013	Zindagi 50-50	Inspector Ramakant Rangoji Pawar	
2015	Baby	Mr. Gupta	
2015	Badlapur	Michael Bhai	
2015	Black Home		
2015	ABCD 2	Shetty	
2016	Wazir	Mahesh	
2016	Jai Gangaajal	Munna Mardani	
2016	Tutak Tutak Tutiya	Dilip	
2016	Sanam Teri Kasam	Police Officer	
2017	Poster Boys	Health Minister	
2017	Golmaal Again	Inspector Mohan Dande	
2018	Simmba	Shagun's father (picture only)	
2019	One Day: Justice Delivered	Dr. Ajay	
2019	Saaho	David	
2019	Tadka	Tebli Singh	
2020	Street Dancer 3D	UK Cop	
2022	Radhe Shyam	Chakravarthy	
2022	Major	Commander Shera Singh	
2022	Cirkus	Dr. Roy Jamnadas	
2023	Yaariyan 2	Raajlaxmi's father	
2025	Jaat	Brig. Sukhveer Singh	Cameo appearance

=== Tamil films ===
Year	Title	Role
2011	Dhoni	Ghani Bhai
2013	Pattathu Yaanai	Marudhamuthu
2013	Arrambam	Durani
2014	Anjaan	Johnny
2015	Paayum Puli	Lal
2016	Devi	Dilip
2018	Bhaagamathie	ACP Sampath
2019	Kennedy Club	Mukesh Rathore
2023	Kolai	Adithya Koushik
2024	Rathnam	Beema Rayudu / Dharmalingam
2024	Mazhai Pidikkatha Manithan	Surla IPS
TBA	Valai	TBA

=== Films in other languages ===
Year	Title	Role	Language
2012	Karmayodha	Khais Khanna	Malayalam
2012	Ajintha	Mukhiya	Marathi
2013	Vijay Aso	MLA	Marathi
2014	Poshter Boyz	Cabinet Minister in State Government	Marathi
2016	Guru	Maan Singh	Marathi
2016	Ghantaa	Sanjay Hegde	Marathi
2023	Kabzaa	CM Veer Bahaddur	Kannada
2024	UI	Kiran Adarsh	Kannada

=== Television ===
Year	Title	Role	Language	Notes
1997–98	Raja Aur Rancho		Hindi	Episodic
1997	Ghar Jamai	Doctor Salim	Hindi	
1998	Saaya	Mr Malik	Hindi	
1998	Rishtey	Guest	Hindi	
2002	Aryamaan – Brahmaand Ka Yodha	Shukrant	Hindi	
2004	Special Squad	Bomber	Hindi	
2006	CID	Killer	Hindi	Episode 440
2013	Hum Ne Li Hai... Shapath	Rangeela	Hindi	Episode 189,190
2026	Super Subbu	Chilukri Kukkuteshwar Rao	Telugu	Netflix series
