= Simba (2019 film) =

2019 Indian film by Arvind Sridhar

- Theatrical Release Poster
- Directed by: Arvind Sridhar
- Written by: Arvind Sridhar
- Produced by: K. Sivaneswaran; Vasu Arumugam
- Starring: Bharath; Premji; Bhanu Sri Mehra; Swathi Deekshith; Ramana
- Cinematography: Sinu Siddharth
- Edited by: Achu Vijayan
- Music by: Vishal Chandrasekhar
- Production companies: Magic Chair Films; Yasodha Films
- Release date: 25 January 2019
- Running time: 131 minutes
- Country: India
- Language: Tamil
- Box office: ₹50 lakh

Simba is a 2019 Indian Tamil-language stoner comedy film written and directed by Arvind Sridhar. The film stars Bharath, Premgi, Swathi Deekshith, and Bhanu Sri Mehra, while Ramana plays a supporting role. The film has music composed by Vishal Chandrasekhar with cinematography by Sinu Siddharth and editing by Achu Vijayan.

Simba is an experimental movie with a unique plot. The film released on 25 January 2019 to mixed reviews and had an average performance in the theaters. The film is loosely based on the critically acclaimed Australian TV series Wilfred.

== Plot ==
Mahesh (Bharath) is a stoner who leads a lonely life. It is this reason, the film tells us, that has turned him towards cannabis: for instant dopamine hit. One Sunday, after Mahesh has taken a "hit", his neighbour Madhu (Bhanu Sri Mehra) asks him to look after her pet Great Dane, Simba. To Mahesh, who is under the influence of the marijuana, Simba (Premgi) appears to be a person. The rest of the film is about how Mahesh bonds with Simba and how they try to make Madhu fall in love with him.

== Cast ==
- Bharath as Mahesh
- Premgi as Simba
- Bhanu Sri Mehra as Madhu
- Swathi Deekshith as Diana
- Ramana as Deepak
- Srinivasan as Veterinary Surgeon
- Swaminathan
- Swetha Ashok

== Production ==
Arvind Sridhar wrote a dark comedy script and signed on Bharath to appear in the lead role, as a youngster who acquires extra-sensory ability through some negative experiences. Actress Bhanu Sri Mehra was signed on to feature in the film and portray a journalist. Sridhar revealed that he based the script on a real life incident featuring his friend, who was a drug-taker, and spun a fictional story around his experiences. Bharath was initially hesitant about the financial viability of the script in the Tamil film industry but later chose to do the film. Produced by Magic Chair K.Sivaneswaran coordinated by Sathish during June 2015 and progressed across Chennai and Pondicherry. In October 2015, the team held discussion with actress Trisha about playing a cameo role in the film to promote animal welfare.

Although production was completed in 2016, the film was delayed as a result of post-production works and non-availability of screens. A teaser trailer was released in October 2017, while a second teaser was later released in October 2018. After a long delay, the film was released on 25 January 2019.

== Hindi Version ==
Simba is a 2019 Indian Tamil-language stoner comedy film written and directed by Arvind Sridhar. The film was acquired by Inbox Pictures and released in Hindi.

== Soundtrack ==
The soundtrack was composed by Vishal Chandrasekhar. The song Pinjula Pinjula, sung by actor Silambarasan, was released on 6 August 2016, before the release of the entire album.

Simba

Soundtrack album by Vishal Chandrasekhar
- Released: 2019
- Genre: Feature film soundtrack
- Length: 20:55
- Language: Tamil
- Label: Think Music
- Producer: Vishal Chandrasekhar

Vishal Chandrasekhar chronology
Padi Padi Leche Manasu (2018)	Simba (2019)	Kee (2019)

Tracklist
No.	Title	Lyrics	Singer(s)	Length
1.	"Pinjula Pinjula"	Viveka	Silambarasan	4:13
2.	"Marandhadhae"	Vishal Chandrashekhar	Anirudh Ravichander, Tee Jay	3:09
3.	"Sarpetta"	Charukesh Sekar	Anthony Daasan, Arunraja Kamaraj, Vishal Chandrasekhar	3:06
4.	"Pesugiraai"	Jude Chris	Roshini, Sinduri Vishal, Aarnav	3:20
5.	"Bow Wow Vadai"	Subu	Siddharth, Aishwarya Ravichandran	3:20
6.	"Vandhaene"	Vishal Chandrashekhar	Vishal Chandrasekhar, Shilpa Natarajan, Kavita Thomas	3:47
