= Sawaari (2016 film) =

2016 Indian film by Guhan Senniappan

- Sawaari Movie Poster
- Directed by: Guhan Senniappan
- Written by: Guhan Senniappan
- Produced by: Entertainment Brothers
- Starring: Benito Franklin; Sanam Shetty; Karthik Yogi; Mathivanan Rajendran
- Cinematography: Chezhiyan
- Edited by: Kishore Te
- Music by: Vishal Chandrasekhar
- Production company: Entertainment Brothers
- Distributed by: Sri Thenandal Films
- Release date: 18 March 2016
- Running time: 114 min
- Country: India
- Language: Tamil

Sawaari is a 2016 Indian Tamil-language road psychological thriller film written and directed by Guhan Senniappan. The film stars Benito Franklin, Sanam Shetty, Karthik Yogi, and Mathivanan Rajendran. The music was composed by Vishal Chandrasekhar with cinematography by Chezhiyan and editing by Kishore Te. Distributed by Sri Thenandal Films, the film was theatrically released on 18 March 2016. It received positive reviews.

== Plot ==
The movie starts off with three youngsters driving a car on a highway in the night while drunk. While driving, they notice a man asking for a lift, which they give. The unknown man then kills the three. It is then revealed that the unknown man is a psycho killer who kills people by asking them for lifts on highways.

ACP Solomon is assigned to find the psycho killer. He who is getting married the next day, Chennai to Nellore (his wedding place). While driving, his car breaks down. He then asks for a lift from a young man who is delivering a 1990 Contessa car to an MLA who is very concerned about his cars (he once smashed a guy's finger with a hammer for trying to scratch his Toyota Innova car).

The boy who is delivering the car is threatened by the MLA's henchmen to deliver the car within 4:00 P. M., which causes him to take a shortcut that reduces nearly 20 kilometers and helps him cross the tollgate. Solomon and the driver give lift to the boy who gave them directions to the shortcut. Along this route come another two people who, unknowingly, give lift to the psycho killer and take the same shortcut as Solomon, the driver, and the boy. The psycho killer then kills the two.

Solomon's team finds the killer's house and search it thoroughly, finding the clue of a tattoo (the same which the boy Solomon and driver picked up has). It is then revealed that he has misled them. How they find the psycho along the root forms the rest of the story.

== Cast ==
- Benito Franklin as ACP Solomon
- Sanam Shetty as Jeni
- Karthik Yogi as Ravi, the driver boy
- Mathivanan Rajendran as Mathi
- Arun Alexander as Ponmala
- Ramdoss as Sathish
- T. M. Karthik as Psycho
- Kavithalaya Krishnan
- Gajaraj as Commissioner Gajaraj
- Raja Rani Pandian as Inspector Ganesan
- Rio Raj as uncredited role
- Lollu Sabha Easter as MLA's PA
- Janan Jacob as Sub-Inspector Abdul Sukhoor
- Pradeep as Psychiatrist Frederick
- RJ Bharath as RJ
- Malini Sathappan
- Naveen Chandran

== Production ==
The film marked the debut of director Guhan Senniappan, who had finished as a runner up in the reality show Naalaya Iyakkunar's third edition. Vishal Chandrasekhar was signed on to compose the film's music, while Chezhiyan and Kishore worked on the cinematography and editing for the project, with Sawaari, become Kishore's final project to release after his death in 2015. Guhan described the film as a "psycho thriller" featuring a predominantly new cast of Benito Franklin, Karthik Yogi and Mathivanan Rajendran. Beginning production in January 2014, the team shot scenes in Mahabalipuram and carried on filming throughout 2014, before beginning promotions in early 2015.

The delay of the film's release meant that director Guhan moved on to begin work on another project titled Kanneer Anjali in 2015. Sri Thenandal Films later picked up the project in February 2015 and prepared it for a release.

== Soundtrack ==
The soundtrack was composed by Vishal Chandrasekhar, Vishal received critical acclaim for his work in Siddharth's Jil Jung Juk (2015), and recorded songs featuring music composers Anirudh Ravichander, Santhosh Narayanan and Sean Roldan in the album. The song "Shoot the Kuruvi" became well noticed, while for another song "Red Roadu", Vishal worked on a mix between 1950s swing and EDM for the tune. He was recently worked on Aagam, and Krishna gaadi veera prema gaatha featuring Nani. He is now working on several projects like Thaami means selfie and Simba.

Sawaari

Soundtrack album by Vishal Chandrasekhar
- Released: 2016
- Recorded: 2016
- Genre: Feature film soundtrack
- Length: 14:05
- Language: Tamil
- Producer: Vishal Chandrasekhar

Vishal Chandrasekhar chronology
Aagam (2016)	Sawaari (2016)	Krishna Gaadi Veera Prema Gaadha (2017)

Track-list
No.	Title	Singer(s)	Length
1.	"June Malargalin"	Naresh Iyer	4:45
2.	"Ennai Theriyuma"	Sudeep, Vishal Chandrasekhar	3:20
3.	"Paani Poori"	Teejay Arunasalam	2:58
4.	"Escape Theme"	Vishal Chandrasekhar	0:48
5.	"Power of Ponmala Theme"	Vishal Chandrasekhar	1:12
Total length:			14:05

== Critical reception ==
Sawaari has received generally positive reviews from critics. Malini Mannath from The New Indian Express in her review: "The plot follows the road journey of three main characters as they try to reach their respective goals. While the first half is refreshing, with a promise of exciting possibilities that could happen on the trip, the second falls short of what one had been led to expect", 'The director maintaining a racy pace'. Behindwoods rated 2.25 out of 5 stars with the verdict "Sawaari is a decent movie for the budget in which it was made. Fairly engaging crime thriller!."
