= Deyyam (2021 film) =

2021 Telugu horror film directed by Ram Gopal Varma

Dheyyam
- Theatrical release poster
- Directed by: Ram Gopal Varma
- Written by: Ram Gopal Varma
- Produced by: Jeevitha Rajasekhar; Venkata Srinivas Boggaram; Natti Kranthi; Natti Karuna
- Starring: Raja Sekhar; Swathi Deekshith
- Cinematography: Satish Muthyala
- Edited by: Satya Giduturi; Pratap Kumar Sanga (Bobby)
- Music by: Sai Karthik
- Release date: 16 April 2021
- Running time: 98 minutes
- Country: India
- Language: Telugu

Deyyam (transl. The devil) is a 2021 Indian Telugu-language horror film written and directed by Ram Gopal Varma. The film stars Rajasekhar and Swathi Deekshith in pivotal roles. The film was earlier titled as Patta Pagalu.

== Plot ==
The story revolves around Rajasekhar and his happy family. Their lives are disturbed when his teenage daughter is possessed by an evil spirit. The story explores whether or not the doting father is able to save his daughter's life.

== Cast ==
- Rajasekhar as Shankar
- Swathi Deekshith as Vijji
- Ahuti Prasad
- Tanikella Bharani
- Ananth Babu
- Jeeva
- Sana
- Banerjee

== Release ==
As the film's talkie part completed, but Jeevitha and Rajasekhar want to re-shoot some scenes but RGV was not interested and handed it over to Rajasekhar.

== Reception ==
A reviewer from Eenadu criticized the film for its poor story and screenplay while appreciating Deekshit's performance. Surya Prakash of Asianet News also echoed the same, rating the film 1.5/5. He opined that the film was outdated, possibly because it was shot much earlier in 2015.
