= Varudu Kaavalenu =

2021 film by Lakshmi Sowjanya

- Theatrical release poster
- Directed by: Lakshmi Sowjanya
- Screenplay by: Ganesh Kumar Ravuri; Sharat CR
- Story by: Lakshmi Sowjanya
- Produced by: Naga Vamsi
- Starring: Naga Shaurya; Ritu Varma
- Cinematography: Vamsi Patchipulusu; Vishnu Sarma
- Edited by: Naveen Nooli
- Music by: Vishal Chandrashekhar; Thaman S.
- Production company: Sithara Entertainments
- Release date: 29 October 2021
- Running time: 133 minutes
- Country: India
- Language: Telugu

Varudu Kaavalenu (transl. Groom wanted) is a 2021 Indian Telugu-language romantic comedy film directed Lakshmi Sowjanya and produced by Naga Vamsi under Sithara Entertainments. The film stars Naga Shaurya and Ritu Varma.

== Plot ==
Bhoomi runs an eco-friendly start-up business in Hyderabad. Her mother, Prabhavati, wants her to marry soon and is searching for a suitable groom, but Bhoomi is reluctant to marry. Aakash is a successful architect in Paris who decides to come to India to find a life partner.

The owner of Bhoomi's startup is the father of Aakash's friend, and Bhoomi and Aakash meet at his house. After a few meetings, Aakash finds Bhoomi interesting and wants to travel with her, but she doesn't show any interest in him. He becomes an architect for a project that Bhoomi is leading.

At Bhoomi's office, two employees who are in love with each other have a problem as the girl is an orphan and the boy's family wants to marry him off to a well-off family. Aakash convinces the boy's parents to accept the girl, and Bhoomi seems impressed with the conversation and begins enjoying his company.

Aakash helps catch a thief who steals Prabhavati's purse and they start talking about his love and her efforts in getting a groom for her daughter without knowing it is the same person involved. She gives advice to Aakash that if he pretends to move away from his lover, his lover might confess her feelings. The plan goes awry: when Bhoomi meets Aakash to express her feelings, he lies about returning to his hometown to find a bride. Infuriated, Bhoomi tells Aakash that she has been wrong again in loving him for the second time, and reveals that she was in love with Aakash during college when he saved her from a group of rogue students. They became friends after she lost a watch gifted by her father, and Aakash returned it. Bhoomi was about to propose on the last day of college but stopped when she overheard Aakash lecturing a fellow student on how love is an obstacle for growth.

Then Bhoomi realised that she is still loving Akash because her lifestyle is completely based on Akash's tastes. Once Akash liked Bhoomi in saree from that day on words, she only wears saree for the office. She runs the startup, which once he campaigns in the college to save the environment.

Prabhavati, who knows that Bhoomi liked someone who did not work out, suggests that she can get a better groom if she wishes.

Bhoomi and Aakash leave for Araku to take care of marriage preparations of the employees. She does not give Aakash a chance to express his side. She gives her nod to a marriage proposal her mother sent. Before leaving Araku, Aakash confronts Bhoomi about her actions and tells her that he learned about Bhoomi's love for him from her roommate from college whom he accidentally met in Paris. He came to India to see her and fell in love with her during the journey. In spite of his proposal, Bhoomi leaves to Hyderabad for her engagement.

On the day of engagement, she is shocked to see Aakash there, who was called by Prabhavati.

Prabhavati tells Bhoomi that if you love someone let them know. You can never find answer without asking question. Bhoomi and Aakash both feel happy and reconcile.

== Cast ==
- Naga Shaurya as Aakash
- Ritu Varma as Bhoomika "Bhoomi"
- Nadhiya as Prabhavati, Bhoomi's mother
- Murali Sharma as Bhoomi's father
- Jayaprakash as Mr. Bhupathi
- Rohini as Aakash's mother
- Vennela Kishore as Kishore
- Praveen as Raghu, Aakash's PA
- Himaja as 'Selfie' Sarala
- Vaishnavi Chaitanya as Bindu
- Harsha Vardhan as Bhoomi's client
- Kalyani Natarajan as Karthik's relative
- Anand as Karthik's father
- Saptagiri as Lag Leni Bujji
- Pammi Sai as Lag Hari
- Rajitha as Karthik's relative
- Kireeti Damaraju as Proposed groom

== Production ==
Filming began in November 2020 and was shot in Hyderabad. Naga Chaitanya was originally cast for the lead role, but was later replaced by Naga Shaurya. Production finished in August 2021.

== Release ==
The film was scheduled to be theatrically released on 15 October 2021, but was delayed to 29 October.

== Soundtrack ==
Varudu Kaavalenu

Soundtrack album by Vishal Chandrashekhar and S. Thaman
- Released: 25 October 2021
- Recorded: 2021
- Genre: Feature film soundtrack
- Length: 20:55
- Language: Telugu
- Label: Aditya Music
- Producer: Vishal Chandrashekhar; S. Thaman

Vishal Chandrashekhar chronology
Oh Manapenne! (2021)	Varudu Kaavalenu (2021)	O2 (2022)

S. Thaman chronology
Tuck Jagadish (2021)	Varudu Kaavalenu (2021)	Enemy (2021)

Singles from Varudu Kaavalenu
- 1. "Kola Kalle Ilaa" Released: 14 February 2021; 2. "Digu Digu Digu Naaga" Released: 3 August 2021; 3. "Manasulone Nilichipoke" Released: 22 September 2021; 4. "Vaddaanam" Released: 1 October 2021

The soundtrack album of the film is composed by S. Thaman and Vishal Chandrashekhar, while the latter did the film score. The music rights were acquired by Aditya Music.

Track listing
No.	Title	Lyrics	Music	Singer(s)	Length
1.	"Kola Kalle Ilaa"	Rambabu Gosala	Vishal Chandrashekhar	Sid Sriram	3:43
2.	"Digu Digu Digu Naaga"	Anantha Sriram	S. Thaman	Shreya Ghoshal	3:13
3.	"Manasulone Nilichipoke"	Sirivennela Seetharama Sastry	Vishal Chandrashekhar	Chinmayi	3:31
4.	"Vaddaanam"	Rambabu Gosala	S. Thaman	Geetha Madhuri, ML Gayathri, Aditi Bhavaraju, Sruthi Ranjani, Sri Krishna	4:12
5.	"What To Do"	Lakshmi Priyanka	Vishal Chandrashekhar	Amala Chebolu	2:46
6.	"Chenguna Chenguna"	Sri Mani	Vishal Chandrashekhar	Sinduri	3:27
Total length:					20:55

== Reception ==
The Times of India critic Thadagadh Pathi rated the film 3/5 and said that it was a "sincere attempt at a light-hearted film". Pathi appreciated the performances, and wrote "Naga Shaurya seems to have developed a maturity when it comes to picking unique scripts. Ritu grabs more screen-time than Shaurya and is graceful as ever. Nadiya, Murli Sharma, Vennela Kishore and others too perform well." Sangeetha Devi Dundoo of The Hindu felt that Varudu Kaavalenu was not enough: "[The film] is a mature urban rom-com but not compelling enough."

Writing for The News Minute, Balakrishna Ganeshan called it a "superficial but refreshing romcom".
