= Swathi Deekshith =

Indian actress

- Other name: Swati Dixit
- Occupation: Actress
- Years active: 2012–present

Swathi Deekshith is an Indian actress who predominantly works in the Telugu and Tamil films. She starred in films such as Tor Naam (2012), Ladies & Gentlemen (2015) and Simba (2017). In 2020, she entered the Telugu reality TV show Bigg Boss 4 as a wild card contestant and is evicted on day 28.

== Career ==
Deekshith began her career in entertainment through the television show Andamaina Bhamalu in 2009, where she won the title. The success led her to appear in ad films and appear in two films as a child artiste. Her first major acting role was in the Bengali film Tor Naam (2012), before she worked on the Telugu drama film Break Up (2012).

In 2014, Deekshith received a breakthrough after being cast in Ram Gopal Varma's Telugu horror film Deyyam. She was cast after the film's cinematographer Satish Muthyala had shown a trailer of Break Up to Varma. Despite almost completing shoot, the film was later shelved and remains unreleased. During the period, she also moved on to work in two Telugu films, Jump Jilani (2014), where she played a village girl opposite Allari Naresh and Ladies & Gentlemen (2015).

In 2017, Deekshith appeared in three films, her first release being the horror film Chitrangada co-starring Anjali. She later made her debut in Tamil films and featured in the low budget horror film Sathura Adi 3500 and the fantasy film Simba alongside Bharath.

== Filmography ==
Year	Film	Role	Language	Notes/Ref.
2010	Em Pillo Em Pillado	Hero & Heroine's friend role	Telugu	
2012	Tor Naam	Swapna Mollik	Bengali	
2013	Break Up	Nisha	Telugu	
2014	Jump Jilani	Ganga	Telugu	
2015	Ladies & Gentlemen	Deepa	Telugu	
2017	Chitrangada		Telugu	
2017	Sathura Adi 3500		Tamil	
2019	Simba	Diana	Tamil	
2021	Deyyam	Vijji	Telugu	

== Television ==
Year	Show	Role	Ref(s)
2020	Bigg Boss 4	Contestant	
