= Padi Padi Leche Manasu =

2018 film directed by Hanu Raghavapudi

- Theatrical release poster
- Directed by: Hanu Raghavapudi
- Written by: Hanu Raghavapudi
- Produced by: Prasad Chukkapalli; Sudhakar Cherukuri
- Starring: Sharwanand; Sai Pallavi
- Cinematography: Jaya Krishna Gummadi
- Edited by: A. Sreekar Prasad
- Music by: Vishal Chandrasekhar
- Production company: SLV Cinemas
- Release date: 21 December 2018
- Running time: 156 minutes
- Country: India
- Language: Telugu
- Budget: ₹18 crore (US$1.9 million)
- Box office: ₹12 crore (US$1.2 million)

Padi Padi Leche Manasu (transl. A heart that keeps rising and falling) is a 2018 Indian Telugu-language romantic drama film written and directed by Hanu Raghavapudi. The film stars Sharwanand and Sai Pallavi, while Priya Raman, Sampath Raj, Kalyani Natarajan, Murali Sharma, Priyadarshi, and Sunil play supporting roles.

The music was composed by Vishal Chandrasekhar with cinematography done by Jay Kay and editing by A. Sreekar Prasad. The film was finalized in December 2017, and shooting began in February 2018. The film was released on 21 December 2018. It received mixed reviews from critics and ended up as a commercial failure.

== Plot ==
In a Telugu-speaking community in Kolkata, a football player named Surya (Sharwanand) falls for a medical student named Vaishali (Sai Pallavi). The love story is not as simple as it appears. Surya starts trying to make Vaishali fall for him. After Vaishali falls in love with Surya and starts talking about marriage, Surya breaks up with her because of his fear of commitment, resulting from his parents’ failed marriage. Vaishali tells him that exactly a year later, they will meet in Kathmandu, Nepal, and decide whether to get married.

Exactly a year later, the 2015 Nepal earthquake occurs, where Surya is searching for Vaishali. Simultaneously, Vaishali is searching for Surya in Kathmandu. In the earthquake, Vaishali is injured and asks her friend to tell Surya that she is diagnosed with retrograde amnesia and still acts as if she is fine with her friends and family, except Surya. Surya tries to make her fall in love again, in a similar way to what he tried before. One day, Surya's father Vivek, a famous author, comes nearby to give a speech, which is attended by Vaishali, Surya, and Surya's mother. During the speech, Vaishali realizes her love for Surya and his love for her. She asks him to marry her, but he believes she has not lost her memory, infuriating him. In a struggle, Vaishali faints and is admitted to the hospital, where it is revealed that she actually has retrograde amnesia and told only Surya the truth, and that she was slowly forgetting things even in her daily life.

The movie ends with them getting married a few months later.

== Cast ==
- Sharwanand as Surya Ravipati
- Sai Pallavi as Vaishali Cherukuri
- Priya Raman as Padmavathi, Surya's mother
- Sampath Raj as Vivek Ravipati, Surya's father
- Kalyani Natarajan as Vaishali's mother
- Murali Sharma as Prakash Cherukuri, Vaishali's father
- Priyadarshi Pullikonda as Darshi
- Sunil as Chatur Ramalingam
- Vennela Kishore as Gemini Natarajan
- Kalpika Ganesh as Vaishali's friend
- Suhas as Suhas, Surya's friend
- Noel Sean as Shravan
- Ajay as Dr. Rakesh
- Mahadevan as Dhanraj Pillai
- Ravi Kale as Nepal Police Officer
- Satyam Rajesh as Eve Teaser
- Shatru as Dhanraj's henchman
- Kadambari Kiran as Chatur's father
- Vinayak Ram Attili as Vaishali's neighbor
- Appaji Ambarisha Darbha as Gokhale
- Raju Sundaram as a goon (special appearance)
- Hanu Raghavapudi as a passerby in the song “Emai Poyave”

== Production ==
The film schedule was to start by the end of March, but since actress Sai Pallavi had dates only in February, the film start scheduled was preponed to February. The first leg has been shot in Kolkata from 5 February 2018. The second leg of the film was shot extensively in Kathmandu. Some sequences of first leg were shot in interiors of West Bengal. Medical college scenes were shot in Mahindra École Centrale, Hyderabad. Pallavi plays a medical student in the film. Sharwanand lost 10 kilograms and sported a stylish hairstyle for the film. Priya Raman, who played Sharwanand's mother, made her comeback role in acting after 19 years. The film's title was unveiled as Padi Padi Leche Manasu in March 2018.

== Release ==
The film released on 21 December 2018. The film was also dubbed and released in Hindi as Dil Dhadak Dhadak on YouTube on 26 February 2021 by Goldmines Telefilms.

== Soundtrack ==
The soundtrack is composed by Vishal Chandrasekhar after his second collaboration with director Hanu Raghavapudi after Krishna Gaadi Veera Prema Gaadha.

Padi Padi Leche Manasu

Soundtrack album by Vishal Chandrasekhar
- Released: 2018
- Genre: Feature film soundtrack
- Length: 19:15
- Language: Telugu

Vishal Chandrasekhar chronology
Hara Hara Mahadevaki (2017)	Padi Padi Leche Manasu (2018)	Simba (2019)

All lyrics are written by Krishna Kanth.

No.	Title	Singer(s)	Length
1.	"Padi Padi Leche"	Armaan Malik, Sinduri Vishal	3:24
2.	"Kallolam"	Anurag Kulkarni	3:26
3.	"Hrudhayam Jaripe"	Yazin Nizar	3:14
4.	"Emai Poyave"	Sid Sriram	2:35
5.	"O My Lovely Lalana"	Sinduri Vishal	3:20
6.	"Urike Cheli Chilaka"	Rahul Sipligunj, M. M. Manasi	3:16
Total length:			19:15

== Reception ==
Murali Krishna CH of Cinema Express gave 2.5/5 stars and wrote, "The screenplay moves from cliche to cliche, packing in every stereotype you can think of -- from stalking to adding a memory disorder that ends with an emotional outburst of the protagonist with uplifting background score. However, to give credit where it's due, the film does avoid double entendre and sexist jokes." Srivathsan Nadadhur of The Times of India gave 2/5 stars and wrote, "While Hanu Raghavapudi should've made the story more believable, it's a film that the cast and crew would ideally want to erase from their memory sooner or later, like the retrograde amnesia patient in the film." Sangeetha Devi Dundoo of The Hindu wrote, "Hanu Raghavapudi is capable of much better stories. While he gets the best out of his technical team and his lead actors, the plot is a huge letdown."
