= Sajjad Delafrooz =

Model and actor

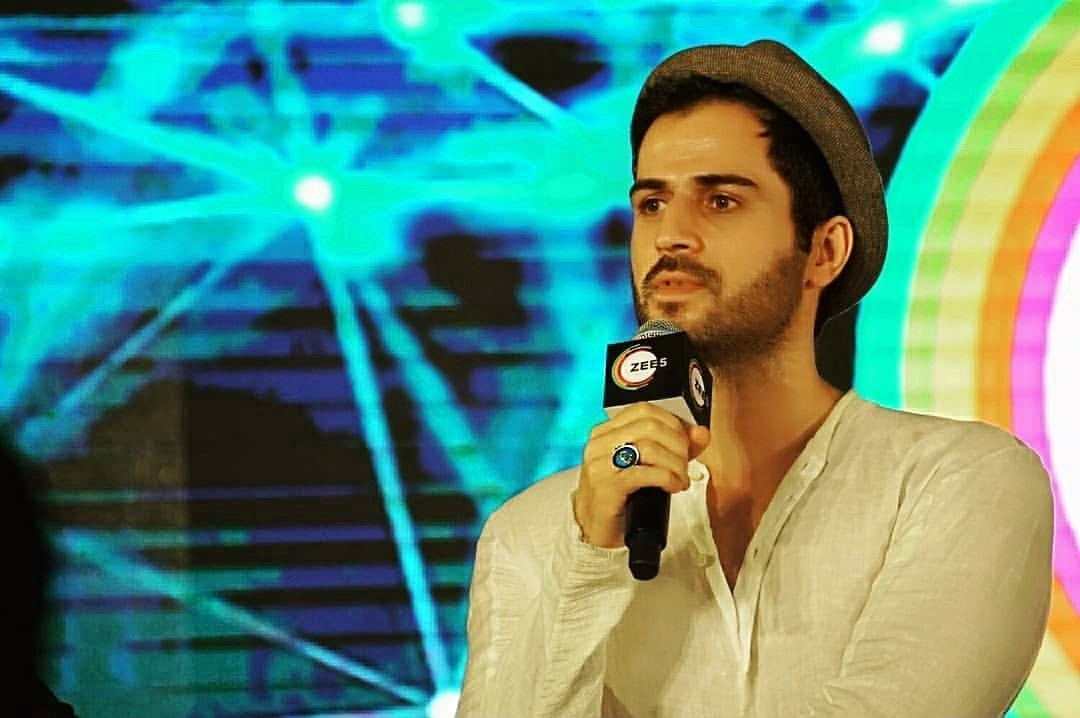
- Born: 22 November 1983 (age 42)
- Occupation: Actor
- Known for: Tiger Zinda Hai, Special OPS; Freddy

Sajjad Delafrooz (born 22 November 1983) is an Iranian actor who was raised in UAE and has been seen in Hindi movies. He has been seen in various films, like Tiger Zinda Hai as the main antagonist opposite Salman Khan, where Salman Khan called him the new Gabbar Singh of Bollywood. He garnered acclaim for his role on Special OPS.

== Filmography ==
Year	Film	Role	Notes
2015	Baby	Saudi Doctor	
2016	Journey	Nima	Television film
2017	Kung Fu Yoga	Rich man	
2017	Tiger Zinda Hai	Abu Usman	
2022	Freddy	Rustom Irani	
2022	Heropanti 2	Ranjeet Shenoy	
2023	Hukus Bukus	MLA Iqbal Qureshi	
2026	Fauzi		Telugu debut

== Television/ Web Series ==
Year	Series Name	Channel	Role	Notes
2014	A Letter		Prisoner	
2016	Journey			
2016	Follow the Money		Aslam	
2019	Parchhayee: Ghost Stories by Ruskin Bond	ZEE5	Nikhil	
2020	Special OPS	Hotstar	Hafiz Ali/ Iqlakh khan	
