= Vishal Chandrashekhar =

Indian film score and soundtrack composer

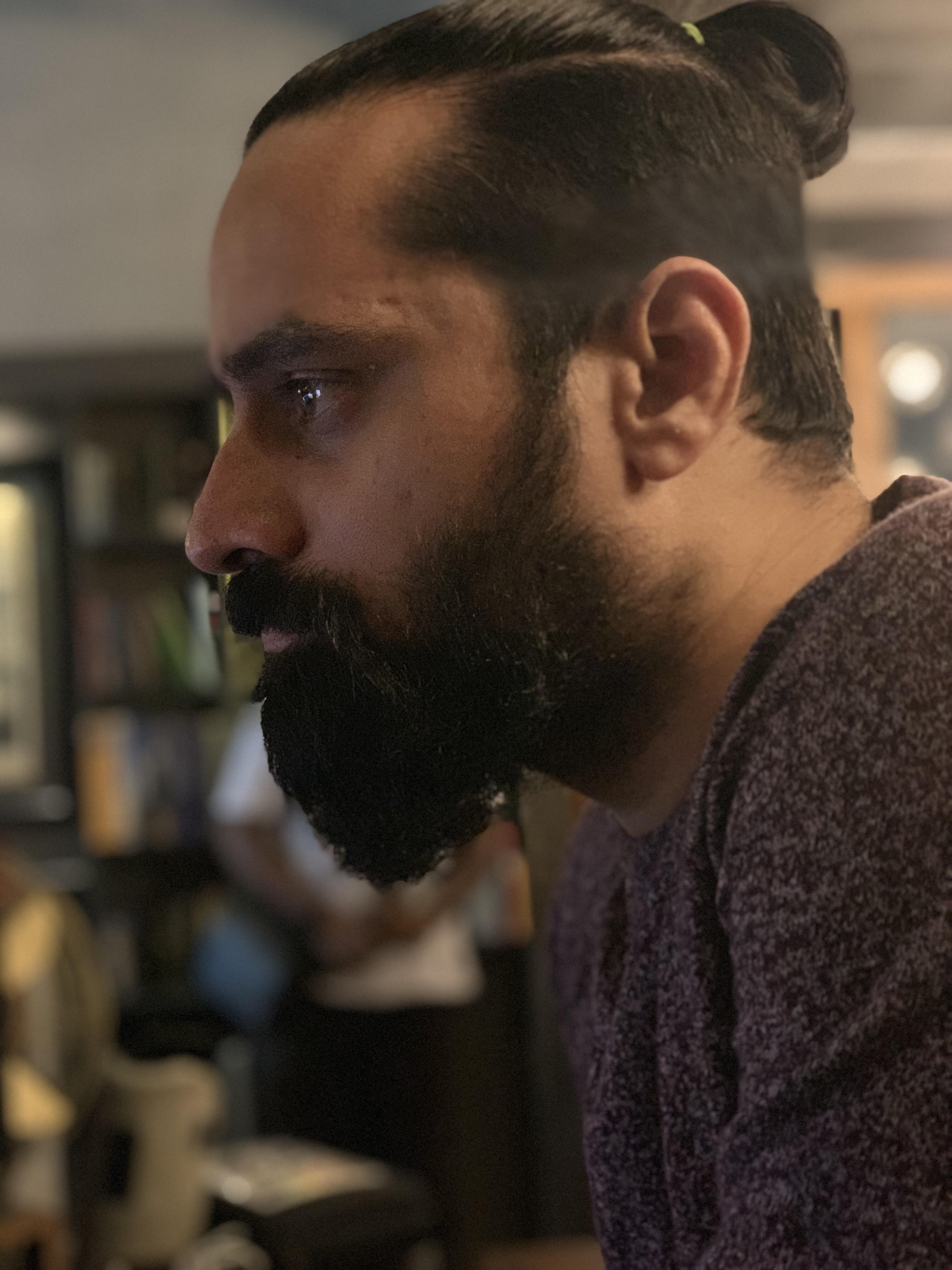
- Chandrashekhar clicked at studio

Background information
- Born: Chennai, Tamil Nadu, India
- Occupations: Music producer; singer; songwriter; lyricist; programmer; arranger
- Years active: 2002 – present
- Labels: KM Music Conservatory; Sony Music India; Think Music India; Trend Music; Divo

Vishal Chandrashekhar is an Indian film score and soundtrack composer, who has predominantly scored music for Tamil and Telugu films.

== Career ==
Vishal started playing the keyboard aged six and began to give solo shows by the time he was ten years old. He graduated from Anna University with a master's degree in Electronic Media, and worked on over 450 short films and 250 ad jingles, en route to being adjudged the best music director in the Nalaya Iyakkunar show on Kalaignar TV. He subsequently completed the foundation course at the KM Music Conservatory. Vishal made his composing debut with Brindha Das's Hi Da during 2012, with a grand audio launch attended by Gautham Menon during January 2013. Despite having the soundtrack released and a trailer launched, the film failed to have a theatrical release. Vishal got an opportunity to work with Santhosh Sivan for the making of his war film, Inam (2014), and won positive reviews for his work. A critic from NDTV noted "the music helps you connect with the film on an emotional level" and "even though there are three songs included merely to give the film a commercial touch, it's his background score that draws your attention". He also completed work on the Telugu film Hrudayam Ekkadunnadi (2014), while he went on to work on the Tamil science fiction film, Appuchi Gramam (2014), which became noted for its song "En Kannukulle".

Vishal received critical acclaim for his work in Siddharth's Jil Jung Juk (2015), and recorded songs featuring music composers Anirudh Ravichander, Santhosh Narayanan and Sean Roldan in the album. The song "Shoot the Kuruvi" became well noticed, while for another song "Red Roadu", Vishal worked on a mix between 1950s swing and EDM for the tune. He was recently worked on Sawaari and Krishna Gaadi Veera Prema Gaatha featuring Nani. He worked as a music director forSimba. He is also venturing into Independent music with Music videos this year. He is working with young technicians and artists in a Music video called Rhythm of life. The video directed by Sam Paul P, starring Ashwin Kumar Lakshmikanthan and lyrics penned by Vishnu Edavan, and has male and female vocals by Yazin Nizar and Kavya Ajith respectively.

His work in the 2022 Telugu film Sita Ramam received appreciation from audience and critics alike.

== Discography ==
=== Films ===
Year	Title	Language	Notes
2011	Mugaputhagam	Tamil	Short film; credited as Nandha
2013	Hi Da	Tamil	Unreleased film
2013	Hrudayam Ekkadunnadi	Telugu	
2013	Inam	Tamil	
2014	Appuchi Gramam	Tamil	
2015	Jil Jung Juk	Tamil	
2016	Aviyal	Tamil	Segments: Shruthi Bedham, Kanneer Anjali
2016	Aagam	Tamil	
2016	Sawaari	Tamil	
2016	Krishna Gaadi Veera Prema Gaadha	Telugu	
2016	Uriyadi	Tamil	One song ("Maane Maane Unplugged")
2016	Theri	Tamil	As lyricist; one Song "Hey Aasmaan"
2017	Kuttram 23	Tamil	
2017	Sangili Bungili Kadhava Thorae	Tamil	
2017	Brindavanam	Tamil	
2017	7 Naatkal	Tamil	
2017	Rangoon	Tamil	
2017	Kathalo Rajakumari	Telugu	
2017	Hara Hara Mahadevaki	Tamil	One song "Aiyo Konjam"
2018	Padi Padi Leche Manasu	Telugu	
2019	Simba	Tamil	
2019	Kee	Tamil	
2019	Jackpot	Tamil	
2019	Chanakya	Telugu	
2019	Kaalidas	Tamil	
2020	Taana	Tamil	
2020	Mamakiki	Tamil	
2020	Kanni Raasi	Tamil	
2021	Oh Manapenne	Tamil	
2021	Poochandi		
2021	Varudu Kaavalenu	Telugu	
2022	O2	Tamil	
2022	Sita Ramam	Telugu	Nominated–SIIMA Award for Best Music Director – Telugu
2023	Soppana Sundari	Tamil	Background Score only
2023	Chithha	Tamil	Background Score only
2024	Birthmark	Tamil	
2024	Level Cross	Malayalam	
2024	Bachchala Malli	Telugu	
2024	Thiru.Manickam	Tamil	
2025	Single	Telugu	
2026	Nari Nari Naduma Murari	Telugu	
2027	Fauzi †	Telugu	

=== Independent Music Videos ===
Year	Song	Label
2016	Va Va Thala (Thala Anthem)	Trend Music
2017	Rhythm of life	Sony Music
2018	Va Mama! Made in Chennai Anthem	Behindwoods

=== Television ===
Year	Title	Channel
2017	Azhagiya Tamil Magal	Zee Tamil
2017	Poove Poochudava	Zee Tamil
2017	Yaaradi Nee Mohini	Zee Tamil
2017	Sembaruthi	Zee Tamil
2018	Rekka Katti Parakkudhu Manasu	Zee Tamil
2018	Oru Oorula Oru Rajakumari	Zee Tamil
2018	Vella Raja	Amazon Prime Video
2019	Sathya	Zee Tamil
2019	Gokulathil Seethai	Zee Tamil
2019	Rettai Roja	Zee Tamil
2020	Neethane Enthan Ponvasantham	Zee Tamil
2020	Mugilan	Zee5
2020	Triples	Hotstar
