= Hanu Raghavapudi =

Indian film director and screenwriter

- Born: Hanumanth Rao Raghavapudi; Kothagudem, Telangana, India
- Occupations: Film director; Screenwriter
- Years active: 2012–present

Hanu Raghavapudi is an Indian film director and screenwriter who works in Telugu cinema. He is best known for directing the notable romantic drama Sita Ramam (2022) and neo-noir action thriller film Fauzi (2026).

== Education and career ==
Raghavapudi hails from Kothagudem of Telangana. He studied up to graduation there and completed his MCA in Hyderabad.

He worked as an assistant director for movies Aithe, Okkadunnadu and as associate director for Anukokunda Oka Roju with director Chandra Sekhar Yeleti. He made his debut with Andala Rakshasi, and also directed the short film, I Am Famous along with feature films Krishna Gadi Veera Prema Gaadha, Lie and Padi Padi Leche Manasu.

In 2022, Raghavpudi directed the film Sita Ramam, a period drama set in 1964, produced by Vyjayanthi Movies.

== Filmography ==
Key
| † | Denotes films that have not yet been released |

| Year | Title | Notes | Ref. |
|---|---|---|---|
| 2012 | Andala Rakshasi | | |
| 2016 | Krishna Gaadi Veera Prema Gaadha | | |
| 2017 | Lie | | |
| 2018 | Padi Padi Leche Manasu | | |
| 2022 | Sita Ramam | Filmfare Critics Award for Best Telugu Film; Filmfare Award for Best Director - Telugu | |
| 2027 | Fauzi † | | |
