= Krishna Kanth =

Telugu lyricist

- Born: Suryapet, Telangana
- Occupation: Lyricist
- Years active: 2012–present

Krishna Kanth is an Indian lyricist who works in Telugu films.

== Personal life ==
Krishna Kanth hails from Suryapet, Telangana.

== Discography ==
Year	Title	Composer	Song(s)	Ref(s)
2012	Andala Rakshasi	Radhan	"Ne Ninnu Chera", "Vennante"	
2012	Cinemakeldham Randi	Shravan	"Sala Sala", "Dochey", "Chindeyyraa", "Okkasaari"	
2013	Eyy	Shravan	"Eyy", "Nee Venakale", "Koke", "Nee Venakale Remix"	
2013	Alias Janaki	Shravan	"Aranyamantha"	
2013	Kamina	Agastya	"Aata Paata"	
2013	Prema Ishq Kaadhal	Shravan	"Tulle Tulle", "Tulle Tulle - Remix Version"	
2013	Second Hand	Ravi Chandra	"Jo Tera Hi Ho Mera Hai"	
2015	Jil	Ghibran	"Yemaiyindhi Vela"	
2015	Dohchay	Sunny M. R.	"Nacchite Ye Panaina", "Raanaa", "He Is Mr. Mosagadu"	
2015	Mosagallaku Mosagaadu	Manikanth Kadri	"Naavaadai"	
2015	Asura	Sai Karthik	"Peru Theliyani", "Sukumaara"	
2015	Kumari 21 F	Devi Sri Prasad	"Baby U Gonna Miss Me"	
2015	Bhale Manchi Roju	Sunny M. R.	"Ningi Needera", "Mila Mila", "Evari Roopo", "Vareva Ore Maccha", "Bhale Manchi Roju"	
2016	Soggade Chinni Nayana	Anup Rubens	"Addhira Banna"	
2016	Krishnagadi Veera Prema Gaadha	Vishal Chandrashekhar	"Rara Ravera", "Nuvvante Na Navvu", "Krishnagadi Veera Prema Gaadha", "Ulikipadaku Ulikipadaku", "Aa Seetha Devainaa"	
2016	Guntur Talkies	Sricharan Pakala	"Oo Suvarna"	
2016	Gentleman	Mani Sharma	"Dintaka Dintaka", "Saturday Night Fever"	
2017	Mister	Mickey J. Meyer	"Kanulake Teliyani", "Kadile Lokam Mottham", "Sayyori Sayyori", "Jhoomore Jhoomore"	
2017	Radha	Radhan	"Kaakki Chokka"	
2017	Darshakudu	Sai Karthik	"Aakasam Dinchi"	
2017	LIE	Mani Sharma	"Miss Sunshine", "Laggam Time", "Freedom"	
2017	Kadhalo Rajakumari	Vishal Chandrashekhar	"Nallani Kanulalo", "Ye Piduguki", "Manase Thalupe", "Marala Raaa"	
2017	Mahanubhavudu	Thaman S	"Mahanubhavudu", "Kiss Me Baby", "Rendu Kallu", "Kiss Me Baby - Extra Bit"	
2017	Next Nuvve	Sai Karthik	"Ala Meda Mida"	
2017	PSV Garudavega	Sricharan Pakala	"Premale"	
2017	London Babulu	K	"Babu Jabu Vachera", "Ekkada Ekkada", "Nightu Nine", "Thirigi Thirigi", "Paapam Pilladevaro"	
2017	Balakrishnudu	Mani Sharma	"Entha Varalaina"	
2017	June 1:43	Shravan	"Friendship", "Ninnu Chudaganey", "Nelavanka", "Maradala", "Rara Macha"	
2017	Jawaan	Thaman S	"Intiki Okkadu Kavale", "Aunanaa Kaadanaa"	
2017	Malli Raava	Shravan Bharadwaj	"MalliRaava", "Chinuku", "Welcome Back to Love", "Ennadu", "Adugasale", "Chinuku - Reprise", "MalliRaava - Reprise", "Telsi Telsi"	
2018	Gang	Anirudh Ravichander	"Chitike"	
2018	Awe	Mark K. Robin	"Theme Of Awe"	
2018	Chal Mohan Ranga	Thaman S	"Ga Gha Megha"	
2018	Krishnarjuna Yudham	Hiphop Tamizha	"Thaaney Vachhindhanaa"	
2018	Ee Nagaraniki Emaindhi	Vivek Sagar	"Aagi Aagi"	
2018	Taxiwaala	Jakes Bejoy	"Maate Vinadhuga", "Ladies And Gentlemen", "Crazy Car", "Neeve Neeve", "Maate Vinadhuga - Official Remix"	
2018	Padi Padi Leche Manasu	Vishal Chandrashekhar	"Padi Padi Leche", "Kallolam", "Hrudhayam Jaripe", "Emai Poyave", "O My Lovely Lalana", "Urike Cheli Chilaka"	
2019	Jersey	Anirudh Ravichander	All songs	
2019	Dear Comrade	Justin Prabhakaran	"Yetu Pone"	
2019	Saaho	Guru Randhawa	"Ye Chota Nuvvunna"	
2019	Saaho	Shankar-Ehsaan-Loy	"Baby Won't You Tell Me"	
2020	HIT: The First Case	Vivek Sagar	"Poraatame", "Ventaade Gaayam"	
2020	V	Amit Trivedi	"Baby Touch Me Now"	
2021	Paagal	Radhan	"Ee Single Chinnode", "Aagave Nuvvagave"	
2021	Gamanam	Ilaiyaraaja	"Entha Entha Choosinaa", "Song Of Life", "Chithrala Jagamidi Lera"	
2021	Shyam Singha Roy	Mickey J. Meyer	"Rise of Shyam", "Edo Edo"	
2022	Radhe Shyam	Justin Prabhakaran	"Sanchari", "Nagumomu Thaarale", "Ee Raathale", "Ninnele"	
2022	Vikram Hitlist	Anirudh Ravichander	"Porata Simham"	
2022	Sita Ramam	Vishal Chandrashekhar	"Inthandham", "Oh Prema", "Yevarini Adaganu", "Tharali Tharali", "Ninnati Theepi"	
2022	Macherla Niyojakavargam	Mahati Swara Sagar	"Adirindey", "Pori Superoo"	
2022	Oke Oka Jeevitham	Jakes Bejoy	"Okate Kadhaa"	
2022	The Life of Muthu	A. R. Rahman	"Ninne Thaladanne", "Malle Poovu"	
2022	Urvasivo Rakshasivo	Achu	"Kalisunte"	
2022	HIT: The Second Case	M. M. Srilekha	"Urike Urike"	
2022	HIT: The Second Case	Suresh Bobbili	"Poratame 2"	
2023	Kalyanam Kamaneeyam	Shravan Bharadwaj	"Oh Manasa", "Ho Egire", "Ayyo Ento", "Wedding Anthem (Promotional Song)", "Tension Tension", "Lokam Motham"	
2023	Virupaksha	B. Ajaneesh Loknath	"Nachavule Nachavule", "Ragile Jwaale"	
2023	Takkar	Nivas K. Prasanna	"Rainbow Chivarey", "Nuvvo Sagam", "Pedhavulu Veedi Maunam", "Kayyaale", "Oopirey"	
2023	Samajavaragamana	Gopi Sundar	"Humsafar"	
2023	Bhaag Saale	Kaala Bhairava	"Kootha Ramp"	
2023	Rangabali	Pawan Ch	"Kala Kantu Unte"	
2023	Jailer	Anirudh Ravichander	"Bandhamele"	
2023	King of Kotha	Jakes Bejoy	"Hallaa Machaare"	
2023	Maama Mascheendra	Chaitan Bharadwaj	"Gaalullona"	
2023	Chinna	Dhibu Ninan Thomas	"Kaalamedho", "Neeve Swasave"	
2023	Chinna	Santhosh Narayanan	"Needhele"	
2023	Tiger Nageswara Rao	G. V. Prakash Kumar	"Samarale Sariovna"	
2023	Breathe	Mark K Robin	"Epudepudoo", "Nelakannaa Mundhe"	
2023	Hi Nanna	Hesham Abdul Wahab	"Ammaadi", "Adigaa", "Idhe Idhe", "Chedhu Nijam"	
2023	Extra Ordinary Man	Harris Jayaraj	"Danger Pilla"	
2023	Salaar: Part 1 – Ceasefire	Ravi Basrur	"Sooreede", "Prathi Gaadhalo", "Vinaraa", "Aaru Sethulunnaa"	
2024	Saindhav	Santhosh Narayanan	"Lekka Maaruddi"	
2024	Eagle	Davzand	"Gallanthe", "Hey Garuda"	
2024	Om Bheem Bush	Sunny M.R.	"Dil Dhadke", "Neeli Moha Megham", "Thaalajaalane", "Anuvanuvuu", "The Wedding Song", "Oka Kalalaa"	
2024	Prathinidhi 2	Mahati Swara Sagar	"Journalist Anthem", "Apudo Ipudo", "Rajuvayyoo"	
2024	Manamey	Hesham Abdul Wahab	"Oh Manamey"	
2024	Kalki 2898 AD	Santhosh Narayanan	"Keshava Madhava (Telugu)"	
2024	Amaran (D)	G. V. Prakash Kumar	"Azadi", "Usure Usure", "Vaane Vaane", "Amara Samara", "Kalave"	
2024	Committee Kurrollu	Anudeep Dev	"Aa Rojulu Malli Raavu"	
2024	Veeranjaneyulu Viharayatra	RH Vikram	"O Malupe"	
2024	Double iSmart	Mani Sharma	"Mother Song"	
2024	Saripodhaa Sanivaaram	Jakes Bejoy	"Sa Ri Ma Pa", "Malupero"	
2024	Aho Vikramaarka	Arko	"Salma"	
2024	ARM (D)	Dhibu Ninan Thomas	"Chimma Cheekatlo", "Ambaraala Veedhilo", "Kaarchichhu", "Chilake"	
2024	Roti Kapda Romance	Harshavardhan Rameshwar	"Galeez", "Oh My Friend"	
2024	Fear	Anup Rubens	"Mabbullo Thega Vugelaa", "Fear Title Song"	
2025	Neeli Megha Shyama	Shravan Bharadwaj	"Neeli Meghamanthata"	
2025	14 Days Girlfriend Intlo	Mark K. Robin	"Manase"	
2025	Dear Uma	Radhan	"Nee Guruthulo"	
2025	HIT: The Third Case	Mickey J. Meyer	"Prema Velluva", "Abki Baar Arjun Sarkaar", "Poratame 3.0"	
2025	Chaurya Paatham	Davzand	"Okkasariga"	
2025	Meghalu Cheppina Prema Katha	Justin Prabhakaran	"Saage Nade"	
2025	Kingdom	Anirudh Ravichander	"Hridayam Lopala", "Anna Antene", "Ragile Ragile"	
2025	Coolie	Anirudh Ravichander	"Monica", "Oopirive"	
2025	War 2	Pritam	"Salam Anali" (Telugu dubbed)	
2025	Telusu Kada	Thaman S.	"Mallika Gandha"	
2025	Kaantha - (D)	Jhanu Chanthar	"Pasi Manase", "Ammadive"	
2025	Vidaamuyarchi	Anirudh Ravichander	"Pattudala"	
2025	L2: Empuraan	Deepak Dev	"Azrael"	
2025	Robinhood	G. V. Prakash Kumar	"One More Time"	
2025	Good Bad Ugly	G. V. Prakash Kumar	"OG Sambavam"	
2025	Veeraraju 1991	Gagan Baderiya	"Oore Oogaliley"	
2025	Mirai	Gowra Hari	"Vibe Undi"	
2025	Gatha Vaibhava	Judah Sandhy	"Varnamaala"	
2025	Andhra King Taluka	Vivek–Mervin	"Chinni Gundelo"	
2025	Champion	Mickey J. Meyer	"I Am a Champion"	
2025	Love OTP	Anand Raja Vikram	"Nachesavule"	
2026	Mrithyunjay	Kaala Bhairava	"Ee Zindagi", "Kanneere Raadha"	
2026	Bad Boy Karthik	Harris Jayaraj	"Andhamaina Figaru Nuvvaa"	
