= Krishna Gaadi Veera Prema Gaadha =

- Theatrical release poster
- Directed by: Hanu Raghavapudi
- Written by: Hanu Raghavapudi
- Produced by: Ram Achanta; Gopichand Achanta; Anil Sunkara
- Starring: Nani; Mehreen Pirzada
- Cinematography: J. Yuvaraj
- Edited by: M. R. Varma
- Music by: Vishal Chandrasekhar
- Production company: 14 Reels Entertainment
- Release date: 12 February 2016
- Running time: 148 minutes
- Country: India
- Language: Telugu
- Budget: ₹14 crore (US$1.5 million)
- Box office: ₹13.34 crore (US$1.4 million) (distributor share)

Krishna Gaadi Veera Prema Gaadha (lit. 'Krishna's Great Love Tale') is a 2016 Indian Telugu-language romantic comedy thriller film written and directed by Hanu Raghavapudi. Produced by Ram Achanta, Gopichand Achanta and Anil Sunkara under 14 Reels Entertainment, the film features Nani and debutant Mehreen Pirzada in the lead roles while Harish Uthaman, Sampath Raj, Murali Sharma, and Brahmaji play supporting roles. The film released on 12 February 2016. The film is considered one of the "25 Greatest Telugu Films Of The Decade" by Film Companion.

== Plot ==
Krishna is a soft-natured person who is in love with Mahalakshmi. The world does not know that they are secretly talking to each other. Mahalakshmi is the sister of Ramaraju, a strong follower of Rajanna, a factionist in the Rayalaseema region. Rajanna's ruthless brother is an encounter specialist ACP Srikanth. Internationally wanted mafia don David returns to Hyderabad to fulfill his mother’s final wish, while his brother Sunny arranges for his safety. However, things take a turn for the worse when Rajanna's house gets attacked by hired hitmen, during which Rajanna and Ramaraju get shot. In order to save Srikanth's kids, Ramaraju entrusts them to Krishna to return them to Srikanth's house in Hyderabad. He tells him that if he returns the kids safely, he will marry his sister to Krishna. After a series of incidents, Krishna returns the kids safely. Finally, David gets arrested, and Krishna and Mahalakshmi marry and live happily ever after.

== Cast ==
- Nani as Krishna
- Mehreen Pirzada as Mahalakshmi
- Harish Uthaman as Sunny
- Sampath Raj as ACP Srikanth
- Murali Sharma as Abdul Azeem Al-hakim Mohammad Bin Syed Aziz David Ibrahim 'aka' David Bhai
- Shatru as Ramaraju, Mahalakshmi's brother
- Brahmaji as Veerendra
- Prudhvi Raj as SI Jamadagni
- Satyam Rajesh as Rajesh, Krishna's friend
- Mahadevan as Rajanna
- Ravi Kale as Satya
- Prabhas Sreenu as Taxi Driver
- Naina Kommera as Chinnari Pelli Kooturu
- Sree Pratham Raviprolu as Chhota Bheem
- Shravan as Goon
- Vasanthi as Chutki
- Annapoorna as Parvathamma
- Mukhtar Khan as DCP
- Fish Venkat
- John Kokken

== Production ==
The film's first look was released on 7 January 2016. The film's release date was announced as 17 February 2016 .

== Music ==
Krishna Gaadi Veera Prema Gaadha

Soundtrack album by Vishal Chandrasekhar
- Released: 25 January 2016
- Recorded: 2015
- Genre: Feature film soundtrack
- Length: 16:58
- Language: Telugu
- Label: Lahari Music
- Producer: Vishal Chandrasekhar

Vishal Chandrasekhar chronology
Sawaari (2016)	Krishna Gaadi Veera Prema Gaadha (2016)	Uriyadi (2016)

The soundtrack was composed by Vishal Chandrasekhar, with lyrics written by Krishna Kanth. The audio rights were acquired by Lahari Music. The full album was released on 25 January 2016.

Tracklist
No.	Title	Artist(s)	Length
1.	"Rara Ravera"	Anthony Daasan, Vedala Hemachandra	03:59
2.	"Nuvvante Na Navvu"	Haricharan, Sindhuri Vishal	04:34
3.	"Krishnagadi Veera Prema Gaadha"	Ranjith	03:06
4.	"Ulikipadaku Ulikipadaku"	Rahul Nambiar, Sindhuri Vishal	03:08
5.	"Aa Seetha Devaina"	Sumedha, Shriya	02:11
Total length:			16:58

== Reception ==
Sangeetha Devi Dundoo of The Hindu wrote that the film is "An unlikely love story packs in a fair amount of humour in the rugged Rayalaseema terrain." She added that "Vishal Chandrasekhar’s music and J. Yuvaraj’s cinematography are apt for the film’s milieu. The film has its share of fine performances. Nani is a treat to watch."

Deccan Chronicle's Suresh Kaviryani wrote that "Nani once again proves that he is a good actor. He does comedy scenes with ease and one can say that he is now a bankable star. Mehreen, too, has done an excellent job as the female lead and doesn’t look like a debutante at all."

On Raghavpudi's direction, a reviewer Sify opined that "As writer and director, Hanu Raghavapudi has shown his mark once again in telling a story differently with rich visuals. He has acquired his distinct style and that is visible in this movie too."

== Box office ==
=== Domestic ===
Krishna Gaadi Veera Prema Gaadha grossed ₹3 crores on opening day at AP/Telangana box office becoming Nani's biggest opener in India, beating the records of his last film Bhale Bhale Magadivoy. The film grossed ₹10.86 crores in its opening weekend.

=== Overseas ===
Krishna Gaadi Veera Prema Gaadha collected US$41,000 from the premier shows at the United States and US$103,000 on the first day, taking its total to US$144,583.The film witnessed growth on the second day by grossing US$171,447 by collecting $316,029 (₹2.15 crore). The first weekend figures at the United States box office stood at US$464,239. It has collected $550,713 (₹3.77 crores) from 130 screens at the US box office in five days

The film collected $580,892 at the US box office in the first week. According to trade analyst Taran Adarsh, the film has collected $702,288 (₹ 6.82 crores) at the US box office in 10 days. Its 31-day US total collection has reached $772,482 (₹ 5.2 crore). The film has failed to surpass the $1-million in its lifetime.
