= Sita Ramam =

2022 Telugu film by Hanu Raghavapudi

- Theatrical release poster
- Directed by: Hanu Raghavapudi
- Screenplay by: Hanu Raghavapudi; Rutham Samar; Jay Krishna; Raj Kumar Kandamudi
- Story by: Hanu Raghavapudi
- Produced by: C. Aswani Dutt
- Starring: Dulquer Salmaan; Mrunal Thakur; Rashmika Mandanna
- Cinematography: P. S. Vinod
- Edited by: Kotagiri Venkateswara Rao
- Music by: Vishal Chandrasekhar
- Production companies: Vyjayanthi Movies; Swapna Cinema
- Distributed by: See distribution
- Release date: 5 August 2022
- Running time: 163 minutes
- Country: India
- Language: Telugu
- Budget: ₹25 crore (US$2.6 million)
- Box office: est. ₹100 crore (US$10 million)

Sita Ramam (transl. Sita and Ram) is a 2022 Indian Telugu-language period romantic drama film directed by Hanu Raghavapudi, who co-wrote the screenplay with Raj Kumar Kandamudi. Produced by C. Aswini Dutt under the banners of Vyjayanthi Movies and Swapna Cinema, the film stars Dulquer Salmaan and Mrunal Thakur in the titular roles, alongside Rashmika Mandanna and Sumanth in supporting roles. Set in 1964, the narrative interweaves themes of love, duty, and identity against a backdrop of war and political unrest.

The story follows Lieutenant Ram, an orphaned army officer posted at the Kashmir border, who begins receiving anonymous letters from a woman named Sita Mahalakshmi. Determined to uncover her identity, Ram embarks on a journey that transforms into a tale of romance and sacrifice. Principal photography commenced in April 2021 and concluded in April 2022, with filming across Hyderabad, Kashmir, and Russia. Cinematography was handled by P. S. Vinod, while the original score and soundtrack were composed by Vishal Chandrashekhar with lyrics by Sirivennela Seetharama Sastry, Anantha Sriram, and others.

Sita Ramam released theatrically on 5 August 2022 to widespread critical acclaim. Reviewers praised Raghavapudi's direction, the screenplay, music, production design, and particularly the performances of Salmaan and Thakur. The film emerged as a major commercial success, grossing over ₹100 crore (US$13 million) worldwide on a budget of ₹25 crore (US$2.6 million) and ranking as the ninth highest-grossing Telugu film of 2022. It was screened internationally and found notable success in overseas markets, strengthening its reputation as a modern Telugu classic.

At award ceremonies, the film received multiple honors, including the Telangana Gaddar Film Award for Best Feature Film. At the 68th Filmfare Awards South, Sita Ramam led the ceremony with 13 nominations, and won 5 awards, including Best Actress – Telugu (Thakur), Best Film Critics – Telugu (Raghavapudi), and Best Actor Critics' – Telugu (Salmaan).

== Plot ==
In 1985, Afreen, a rebellious Pakistani student in London, is ordered to pay 10 lakh INR in compensation within a month for burning the car of an Indian philanthropist, Anand Mehta, or face prison. Refusing to apologize, she travels to Karachi to secure the funds from her estranged grandfather, Abu Tariq, a retired Pakistan Army Brigadier. Upon arrival, she discovers he has just passed away. According to his will, Afreen will only inherit his estate after she personally delivers a 20-year-old undelivered letter to a woman named Sita Mahalakshmi in Hyderabad, India.

Afreen travels to Hyderabad with her senior, Balaji. She learns that the letter's destination, the Noor Jahan Palace, was converted into a girls' college decades ago, and the estate's veteran accountant does not recall any employee named Sita. To trace her, Afreen locates Vikas Varma, a retired Indian Army officer who served in Kashmir with the letter’s author, Lieutenant Ram, and inquires him about Sita.

In a flashback, during a 1965 geopolitical skirmish engineered by a Pakistani extremist named Ansari, Ram saves a village of Kashmiri Pandits from a manipulated Muslim mob, earning national hero status. An All India Radio journalist, Vijayalakshmi, broadcasts his story, prompting citizens to send letters to the orphaned soldier. Among them is a mysterious letter from Sita Mahalakshmi, who affectionately claims to be his wife through fictional anecdotes. Captivated, Ram uses subtle clues in her subsequent letters to locate her on a train to Hyderabad. Though they briefly meet, they are separated due to a missed connection.

Durjaya, a friend of Ram, tells Afreen that Ram eventually reunited with Sita in Hyderabad, where she worked as a Bharatanatyam teacher at the palace. However, from a portrait at the palace, Afreen discovers that Sita was actually Princess Noor Jahan. A former confidante of Noor, Rekha, explains that Noor used the pseudonym to experience a normal life.

In another flashback, Noor's brother compels her to agree to a marital alliance with an Omani prince to save their estate from financial crisis. Noor travels with Ram to reveal her identity but deeply falls in love with him during the trip. After Ram leaves for Kashmir without learning the truth, a journalist publishes pictures of Noor and Ram, publicising their relationship. When an ambassador of the Prince of Oman urges Noor to give an explanation, she confesses her love for Ram, terminating the alliance, and leaves for Kashmir to reunite with him, ignoring her brother's plea.

In the present, Afreen travels to Kashmir to find Noor, but is detained by Ram's former superior, Vishnu Sharma, who reveals the tragic climax of Ram's career.

In 1965, Ram saves Vishnu from a teenage Pakistani insurgent during a formal dinner with Sita and Vishnu's family and extracts information on Ansari's stronghold, promising to rescue the boy's trapped sister, Waheeda. The Indian Army sanctions a covert strike where Ram successfully neutralizes Ansari, but he and Vishnu are captured by Brigadier Abu Tariq while Ram was trying to protect Waheeda from a fire accident. Pakistan offers a prisoner exchange for only one officer. Ram selflessly chooses Vishnu, who returns to India. Shortly after, a series of leaks leads to a fatal ambush on Indian Army bases. The army brands the missing Ram a traitor, leaving Sita to live under a cloud of public humiliation.

Vishnu then reveals a devastating truth: Afreen is actually Waheeda, the child Ram sacrificed his freedom to save. Overwhelmed with guilt, Afreen ensures the letter finally reaches Noor through Balaji. Through Ram's final words, the truth is laid bare. The Pakistani military had tortured both men, declaring that whoever leaked the Indian base locations would go free. While Ram refused, Vishnu broke under pressure to see his family, inadvertently causing the ambush. Ram was subsequently executed in a Pakistani prison. Attached to the letter is a newspaper clipping proving that Ram had discovered Noor's royal identity all along and was deeply proud of her sacrifice.

Noor exposes Vishnu's treason, prompting a military inquiry that leads to Vishnu committing suicide out of disgrace. Noor officially receives a posthumous medal for Ram’s patriotism from the President of India, fully restoring his honor. Having learned the true cost of peace, a reformed Afreen apologizes to Mehta, inherits her grandfather's wealth, and successfully negotiates the release of 18 Indian prisoners of war.

== Cast ==
- Dulquer Salmaan as Lieutenant Ram
- Mrunal Thakur as Princess Noorjahan / Sita Mahalakshmi (Voiceover by Chinmayi)
- Rashmika Mandanna as Afreen / Waheeda, Brigadier Abu Tariq's adopted granddaughter
- Sumanth as captain, later Brigadier Vishnu Sharma, Ram's superior officer and Vaidehi's husband
- Tharun Bhascker as Balaji
- Sachin Khedekar as late Brigadier Abu Tariq (Pakistani Army), Afreen's grandfather
- Gautham Vasudev Menon as Major Selvan
- Prakash Raj as Brigadier Y. K. Joshi
- Shatru as Lieutenant Vikas Varma, Ram's friend in the Army
- Vennela Kishore as Durjaya Sharma, Ram's friend
- Bhumika Chawla as Vaidehi, Vishnu's wife
- Rukmini Vijayakumar as Prof. Rekha Bharadwaj
- Jisshu Sengupta as Nawab, Princess Noor Jahan's elder brother
- Abhinaya as Noor Jahan's sister-in-law
- Murali Sharma as Subramanyam
- Ashwath Bhatt as Ansari, a terrorist
- Tinnu Anand as Dr. Anand Mehta
- Sunil as Vaaradhi
- Priyadarshi Pulikonda as Journalist Marthandam
- Rohini as Vijayalakshmi
- Rahul Ravindran as Rahul Varma IFS
- Pawan Chopra as General Musa Khan of the Pakistani Army
- Neeraj Kabi as Afreen's family advocate
- Ananth Babu as Seetharamayya
- Goutham Raju as Ticket Collector in train to Madras
- Anish Kuruvilla as Legal Advisor to Noor Jahan's elder brother
- Annapurnamma as a house owner
- Praneeta Pattanaik as Radhika
- Mahesh Achanta as Bharathi
- Geetha Bhascker as the Principal of Women's College
- Bawa as Afreen's roommate
- Nayan Rosh T M as Radio Jockey (Voice)
- Sandeep Raj as a passersby
- Rajkumar Kasireddy as a passersby

== Production ==
=== Development ===
Hanu Raghavpudi got the idea for the film when he bought a book that had an unopened inland letter. Regarding the same, he told The Hindu, "The letter I found in that book, in 2007, was from a mother to her son. I gathered that their family is from Vijayawada and the son is living in a hostel. She had enquired about his well-being and asked when he would be home. It got me thinking, what if the contents of the letter had something crucial that could change the course of events?". An army backdrop was later included in the story as suggested by Rajkumar Kandamudi. Sheetal Sharma was brought in as the costume designer for the film. The film was announced in July 2020. In April 2022, its title Sita Ramam was announced.

=== Casting ===
Dulquer Salmaan was roped in to play the lead role as a military officer, and it is his second collaboration in Telugu cinema with Vyjayanthi Movies after Mahanati (2018). Mrunal Thakur was signed to play Sita by marking her debut in Telugu cinema before Pooja Hegde was finalized and later she is out of the project due to date clashes. Raashi Khanna was initially considered for the role of Afreen before Rashmika Mandanna was finalized for the role. Singer and Voice artist Chinmayi Sripada was roped in to dub for Mrunal in the film, soon after her delivering twin babies.

=== Filming ===
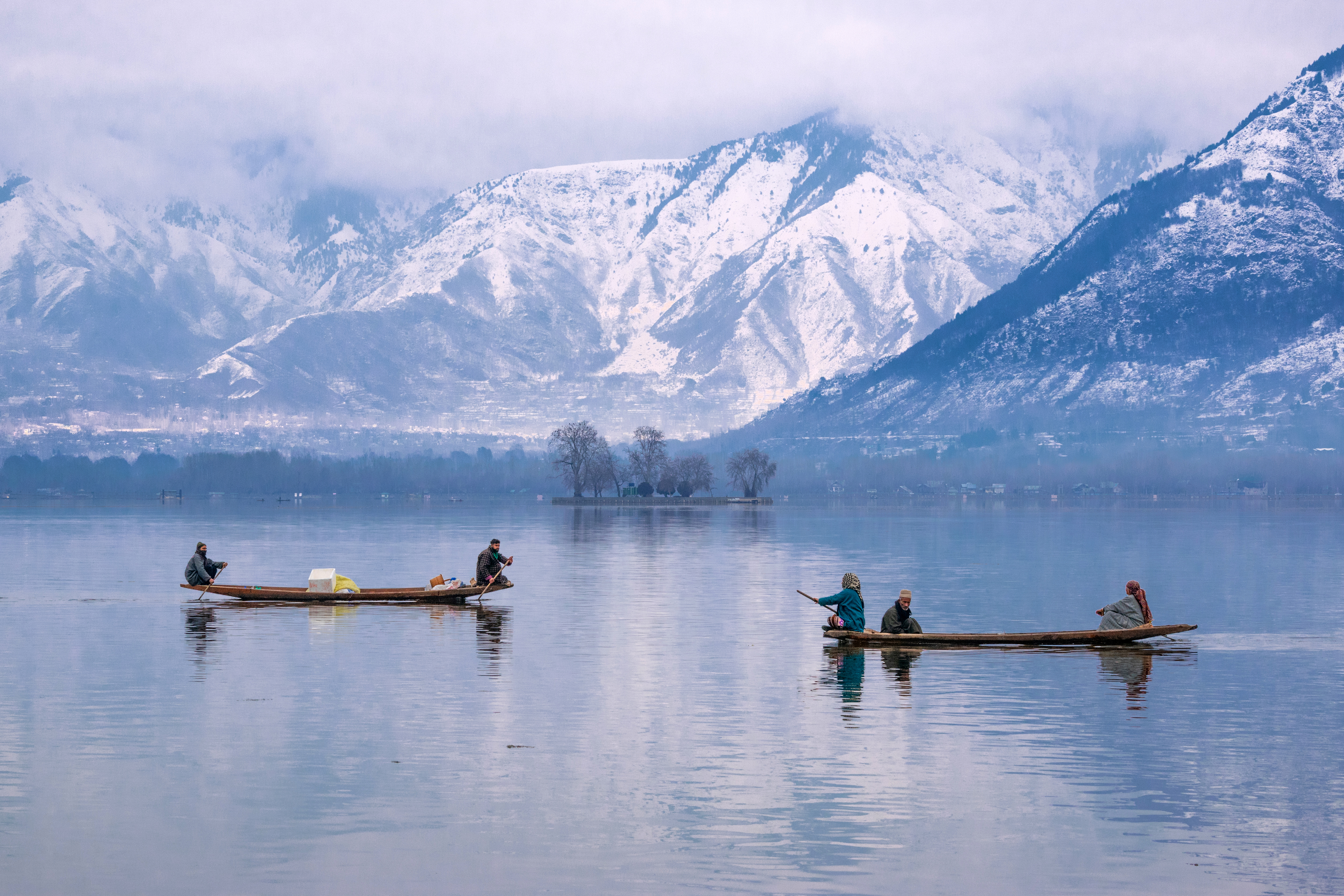
A major portion of the film was shot in Srinagar and at Dal Lake

The principal photography for the film, commenced in April 2021 in Kashmir and the first schedule wrapped up in July 2021. The primary locations in Kashmir were Srinagar's Dal Lake, Jalali House and Sonamarg's Thajwass Glacier. After two subsequent schedules in Russia and Hyderabad, the final schedule took place in April 2022. Some parts of the song "Kaanunna Kalyanam" was also reshot and added in the Tamil version as "Kannukkule".

== Music ==
The music and soundtrack was composed by Vishal Chandrasekhar. The audio rights were acquired by Sony Music India. The first single titled "Oh Sita Hey Rama" was released on 9 May 2022. "Ala Nemaliki - Inthandam Reprise" version sung by S. P. Charan was released later.

== Release ==
=== Theatrical ===
Sita Ramam released on 5 August 2022 in Telugu along with dubbed versions of Tamil and Malayalam languages. The Hindi dubbed version of the film was released on 2 September 2022.

The film's screening was banned in Bahrain, Kuwait, Oman, Qatar, Saudi Arabia and the United Arab Emirates. According to an article published by News18, the ban was a result of the film hurting religious sentiments. Later, the ban in the United Arab Emirates was lifted and the film released there on 11 August 2022. A pre-release event was conducted in Hyderabad on 3 August 2022 with Prabhas attending as guest. The team promoted the film at events in Hyderabad, Vijayawada, Vizag, Chennai and Kochi.

=== Distribution ===
The film is distributed in Nizam region by Asian Cinemas, Krishna (Note: Undivided Krishna district) and Uttarandhra region by Annapurna Studios, Tamil Nadu by Lyca Productions and Wayfarer Films in Kerala. The Hindi version rights were acquired by Pen Studios. In the United States, it is distributed by S. Radha Krishna's Radhakrishna Entertainments. The worldwide theatrical rights of the film were sold at a cost of ₹18.70 crore.

=== Home media ===
The digital distribution rights of the film were acquired by Amazon Prime Video. The film premiered on Amazon Prime Video on 9 September 2022 in Telugu and dubbed versions of Tamil and Malayalam languages. The film premiered on Disney+ Hotstar in Hindi on 18 November 2022. The satellite rights of the film is acquired by Star Maa.

== Reception ==
=== Critical response ===
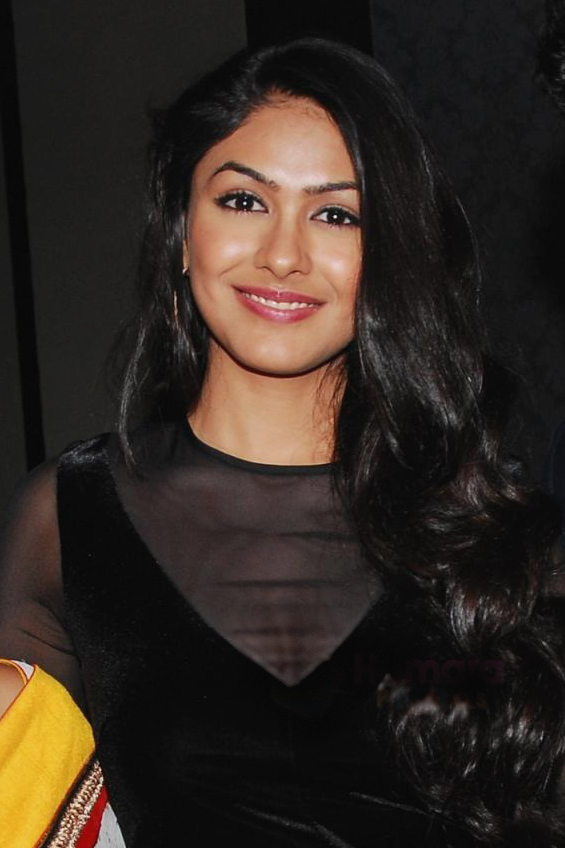
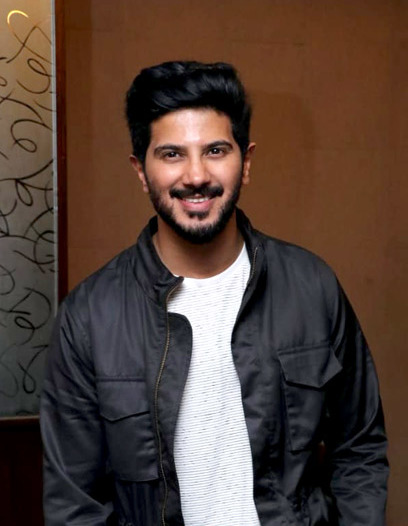
Mrunal Thakur and Dulquer Salman were highly praised by most critics for their portrayal of Sita and Ram respectively.

Sita Ramam received generally positive critical reviews upon release, with praise directed towards the direction, story, screenplay, dialogues, music and performances of the cast. On the review aggregator website Rotten Tomatoes, 86% of 7 critics' reviews are positive, with an average rating of 5.7/10.

Neeshita Nyayapati of The Times of India rated the film 3.5 out of 5 stars and wrote, "With Sita Ramam, Hanu manages to deliver a story that's moving and a film that's visually aesthetic and pleasing". Jayadeep Jayesh of Deccan Herald rated the film 3.5 out of 5 stars and wrote, "Sita Ramam shares its soul with the Bollywood classic Veer-Zaara (2004), yet it maintains an identity of its own". Jeevi of Idlebrain rated the film 3 out of 5 stars and wrote, "On the whole, Sita Ramam is a classy tale of eternal love". Priyanka Sundar of Firstpost rated the film 3 out of 5 stars and called the film "a visually beautiful tale of love and loss". Anji of Sakshi rated the film 3 out of 5 stars, praised the music, cinematography, and direction and called the film 'a beautiful love story'. Soundarya Athimuthu of The Quint rated the film 2.5 out of 5 stars and wrote, "Sita Ramam delivers a poignant love story laced with socio-political messaging".

Janani K of India Today rated the film 2.5 out of 5 stars and wrote, "Sita Ramam is also a musical, as opposed to a romantic story about war". Balakrishna Ganeshan of The News Minute rated the film 2.5 out of 5 stars and wrote, "Sita Ramam tries hard to make the love story between Sita and Ram a poignant tale, but with weak writing, the film does not get the desired response". He also opined that Vennala Kishore's character is related to Lord Hanuman, who helps Rama in his journey to find Sita in the Ramayanam. Manoj Kumar R. of The Indian Express rated the film 2 out of 5 stars and wrote, "The screen presence of Dulquer Salmaan and Mrunal Thakur does add a little vigour to the otherwise dull narration. The film majorly leverages the good looks of its actors to make it tolerable". Gautama Bhaskaran of News 18 rated the film 1.5 out of 5 stars and wrote, "Sita Ramam has all the ingredients of a puffed-up plot, peppered with coincidences and made to look like a web of implausibilities".

A critic for Telangana Today stated, "The film is however for the grooming of Dulquer's fan following. He is a natural charmer and understands the nuances of his role". Writing for Hindustan Times, Haricharan Pudipeddi opined, "Dulquer Salmaan and Mrunal Thakur's film is a tale of love that also takes a mature and sensitive take on the conflict between India and Pakistan". Opining the same, The Hindu's Sangeetha Devi Dundoo wrote, "Hanu Raghavapudi's old-world romance saga brims with earnestness and is helped by charming performances from Dulquer Salmaan and Mrunal Thakur". Princy Alexander of Onmanorama, stated, "Sita Ramam is a heartfelt romantic tale in a strife-torn setting".

=== Box office ===
On its opening day, Sita Ramam collected a gross collection of ₹5.25 crore (US$550,000) in worldwide. In nine days, the film has collected a total gross of $1 million at the United States box office.<The film collected a worldwide gross of ₹50 crore in 10 days, and emerged as a major commercial success at the box office. The film's Hindi version netted ₹8.19 crore at the box office.

== Accolades ==
Award (Note: Awards, festivals and organizations are in alphabetical order.)	Date of ceremony (Note: Date is linked to the article about the awards held that year, wherever possible.)	Category	Recipient(s)	Result	Ref.
Filmfare Awards South	2024	Best Film – Telugu	Sita Ramam	Nominated	
Filmfare Awards South	2024	Best Director – Telugu	Hanu Raghavapudi	Nominated	
Filmfare Awards South	2024	Best Actor – Telugu	Dulquer Salmaan	Nominated	
Filmfare Awards South	2024	Best Actress – Telugu	Mrunal Thakur	Won	
Filmfare Awards South	2024	Best Supporting Actress – Telugu	Rashmika Mandanna	Nominated	
Filmfare Awards South	2024	Best Supporting Actor – Telugu	Sumanth	Nominated	
Filmfare Awards South	2024	Best Music Director – Telugu	Vishal Chandrashekhar And Akash Reddy	Nominated	
Filmfare Awards South	2024	Best Lyricist – Telugu	Sirivennela Seetharama Sastry (Note: Awarded posthumously) ("Kaanunna Kalyanam")	Won	
Filmfare Awards South	2024	Best Lyricist – Telugu	Krishnakanth ("Inthandham")	Nominated	
Filmfare Awards South	2024	Best Male Playback Singer – Telugu	S. P. Charan ("Inthandham")	Nominated	
Filmfare Awards South	2024	Best Female Playback Singer – Telugu	Chinmayi Sripaada ("Oh Prema")	Won	
Filmfare Awards South	2024	Best Film Critics – Telugu	Hanu Raghavapudi	Won	
Filmfare Awards South	2024	Best Actor Critics' – Telugu	Dulquer Salmaan	Won	
Indian Film Festival of Melbourne	11 August 2023	Best Film	Vyjayanthi Movies, Swapna Cinema	Won	
South Indian International Movie Awards	15–16 September 2023	Best Film – Telugu	Vyjayanthi Movies, Swapna Cinema	Won	
South Indian International Movie Awards	15–16 September 2023	Best Director – Telugu	Hanu Raghavapudi	Nominated	
South Indian International Movie Awards	15–16 September 2023	Best Cinematographer – Telugu	P. S. Vinod	Nominated	
South Indian International Movie Awards	15–16 September 2023	Best Actor – Telugu	Dulquer Salmaan	Nominated	
South Indian International Movie Awards	15–16 September 2023	Best Actress – Telugu	Mrunal Thakur	Nominated	
South Indian International Movie Awards	15–16 September 2023	Best Actress Critics' – Telugu	Mrunal Thakur	Won	
South Indian International Movie Awards	15–16 September 2023	Best Female Debut – Telugu	Mrunal Thakur	Won	
South Indian International Movie Awards	15–16 September 2023	Best Supporting Actor – Telugu	Sumanth	Nominated	
South Indian International Movie Awards	15–16 September 2023	Best Music Director – Telugu	Vishal Chandrashekhar And Akash Reddy	Nominated	
South Indian International Movie Awards	15–16 September 2023	Best Lyricist – Telugu	Krishnakanth ("Inthandham")	Nominated	
South Indian International Movie Awards	15–16 September 2023	Best Male Playback Singer – Telugu	S. P. Charan ("Oh Sita Hey Rama")	Nominated	

== See also ==
- List of highest-grossing Telugu films
- List of Telugu films of 2022
