= Kakatiya Institute of Technology and Science =

Autonomous college in Warangal, Telangana, India

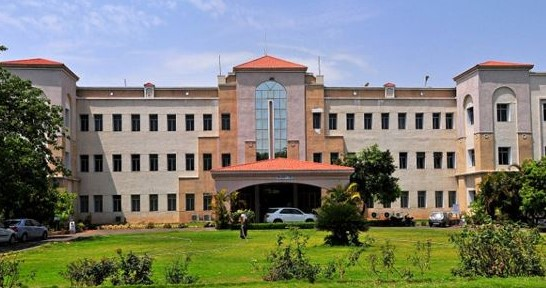
- Kakatiya Institute of Technology & Science
- Type: Education and research institution
- Established: 1980
- Academic affiliations: Autonomous
- Principal: K. Ashoka Reddy
- Location: Opp to Yerragattugutta, Bheemaram, Hanamkonda, Warangal, Telangana, 506015, India; 18.0521919°N 79.5360792°E
- Campus: Urban
- Colors: Blue, Red
- Website: www.kitsw.ac.in
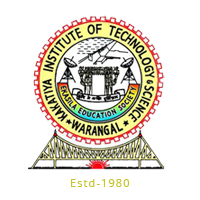

- Location within Telangana Location within India

Kakatiya Institute of Technology & Science (KITSW) is an autonomous college in Warangal district of Telangana in India. It was established in 1980. It is one of the top private Engineering Colleges in the state of Telangana. The college allows undergraduate students through the statewide EAMCET & JEE exams conducted every year. It offers the Bachelor's and Master's in Engineering and MBA courses.

== History ==
The Government of Andhra Pradesh realized in the late 1970s the popular demand for enhancement of facilities for technical education. It decided to adopt a progressive policy of encouraging philanthropic organizations to establish and manage technical institutions.

Kakatiya Institute of Technology & Science, Warangal (KITSW) was established in 1980 under the aegis of the Ekasila Education Society (EES). The former Prime Minister of India, the late P.V. Narasimha Rao Garu, laid the foundation stone for the institute. The members of the EES encompass many sections of society, including educationists, agriculturists, industrialists, doctors, and social workers.

The institution started functioning in 1980 with two B.Tech programs (Civil Engineering and Mechanical Engineering) in a sprawling lush green campus of 65 acres, in an area well connected by rail (Kazipet and Warangal) and road. It is a self-financing co-education autonomous institution and is the first private engineering college in the Telangana region. The institute was the first in the country to offer a B.Tech program in Electronics and Instrumentation Engineering, since 1981.

Started as an undergraduate institution, KITSW is a full-fledged postgraduate institution with nine B.Tech. programs, and seven postgraduate programs. Six academic departments are recognized as the research centres by the NIT Warangal & Kakatiya University, Warangal to offer doctoral programs.

The campus is now Wi-Fi enabled and OFC connected with 40 Mbit/s internet bandwidth.

The undergraduate programs (with an intake of 900 per year from 2017–18) leading to B.Tech are Civil Engineering (120), Computer Science & Engineering (180), Electrical & Electronics Engineering (120), Electronics & Instrumentation Engineering (60), Electronics & Communication Engineering (180), Information Technology (60) and Mechanical Engineering (180).Two more programs Computer Science & Engineering, Networks (60) and Electronics Communication and Instrumentation Engineering (60) were added from the academic year of 2019. The postgraduate programs (with an intake of 247 per year from 2012–13) leading to M.Tech are Structural & Construction Engineering (24), Design Engineering (24), Digital Communication (25), Software Engineering (36), VLSI & Embedded System Design (18), MCA (60) and MBA (60). The total number of research scholars working in the research centres of this institute is 42.

== Campus and location ==
The KITS campus covers 65 acres. It is located in Hasanparthy of Hasanparthy mandal, opposite to Yerragattu Hillock in the Warangal district of Telangana, India.

== Academics ==
The college admits undergraduate students through the statewide EAMCET & TS ECET exam conducted every year. It offers the Bachelor in Engineering (BE) courses.

=== Admissions ===
Students are admitted into the seven branches of engineering under the following categories.

- EAMCET
- Lateral Entry for Diploma Students
- Foreign students (supernumerary)
- NRI/others

The Government of Telangana allows admission of diploma holders into 2nd year under a "lateral entry scheme" to the extent of 10% of intake to each of the branches on a supernumerary basis.

=== Departments ===
The college consists of 12 departments which together offer nine undergraduate programs, ten postgraduate programs and five PhD programs.

- Mechanical Engineering
- Civil Engineering
- Electrical and Electronics Engineering
- Electronics and Communications Engineering
- Electronics and Instrumentation Engineering
- Information Technology
- Computer Science and Engineering

== Student activities ==
=== Society of Automotive Engineers ===
Students from the Mechanical department have the opportunity to take part in the SAE (Society of Automotive Engineers) College Club. SAE International conducts annual events such as SAEBAJA India, including an ATV (all-terrain vehicle) race. All the SAE college clubs in India participate in various events.

Another event which this club recently started is FormulaSAE, where the student SAE college club has to manufacture a Formula 1 vehicle and take it to the BIC Buddh International Circuit to participate in various events.

=== Institute of Electrical and Electronics Engineers ===
Students of the first batch formed an IEEE (Institute of Electrical and Electronics Engineers) students branch, and students of subsequent batches got the branch recognized by the IEEE. Members can access the IEEE Digital library. There are weekly meetings of IEEE student members, as well as debates, group discussions, paper presentations and guest lectures.

== Student Activity Center ==
The Student Activity Center organizes the national level cultural consortium Sanskriti, a two-day event.

SAC clubs include Arts Club, Photography Club, Sports Club, Literary Club, Music,Dance and Fine Arts club, Creative Design Club, Programmer's Arena, Legion's F1 and IEEE chapter. There are technical and cultural events such as the Mechovision, Technoplexus, Electrocom, Parikaran, Meridian, Sristi, Electrovision, Rendezvous and Suprayog.

=== Indian Society for Technical Education ===
The Indian Society for Technical Education is a national, professional, non-profit society registered under the Societies Registration Act of 1860. First started in 1941 as the Association of Principals of Technical Institutions (APTI), it was converted into "Indian Society for Technical Education" in 1968 with a view to enlarge its activities to advance the cause of technological education.

Being the only national organisation of educators in the field of engineering and technology, ISTE is represented in various technical committees and boards formed by the Central Government. The ministry of Human Resource Development, and AICTE/DoE/state governments have also involved the ISTE in many of their important programmes and activities relating to technical education.

=== Computer Society of India ===
The Computer Society of India (CSI) is the country's first and largest body of computer professionals. It was started on 6 March 1965 by a few people and has grown to be the national body representing computer professionals. It has 71 chapters across India, 418 student branches and more than 90,000 members. It is a non-profit professional meet to exchange views and information learn and share ideas.

== Cultural events ==
=== Sumshodhini ===
Sumshodhini, KITSW is a technical fest organised by the student activity centre of KITSW. It includes many technical events, and students from all over the state and country come to participate.

== Sports ==
KITS has a facility for both indoor and outdoor sports, with an area of 10 acres.

== Hostel facility ==
The institute runs a boys' and girls' hostel in the campus under the aegis of the Ekasila Education Society, which accommodates 750 students.

There is a separate gym/fitness centre for boys and girls. Other facilities include a well equipped indoor stadium

== Placements ==
The Institute has recorded campus placements consistently for the past several years in all the branches of specialization.

== Notable alumni ==
- Prashanth R Vihari, music director known for composing music to films such as Chi La Sow, Anthariksham 9000 KMPH, Doorasani and The Girlfriend.
- Ash Ashutosh, CEO of Pincone IT company and former CEO and Founder of Actifio (now acquired by Google).
- V. Ramgopal Rao, Director of Indian Institute of Technology, Delhi.
- Maddi Upendra Reddy, Program Developer of Samsung Bixby, Bengaluru.
- J S Rajender Kumar, CRM, BI Global delivery manager, Sutton, UK.
- Jyosthana Palwani, Senior Manager at Sears Holdings Corporation, Greater Chicago Area, US.
- Vinay Lakkakula, Operations Lead at General Motors, Greater Detroit Area, US.
- Dr P. Srinivas, Professor in Electrical Engineering and joint director of Evaluation in Osmania University, Hyderabad.
- Ravikiran Ghattu, Software Team Leader at Huf North America, Greater Detroit Area, US.
- S. Krishna Chaitanya, IAS (2013), Rank 143, CEO of district Panchayath, Shadal, Madhya Pradesh.
- P. Prem Reddy, Senior Manager, NTPC Ramagundam, Telangana.
- M.Kiran Kumar, Power Network Studies Engineer, Abu Dhabi Transmission & Despatch Company, United Arab Emirates.
- Calatur Sushanto, HR manager, Mobile Iron Pvt Ltd, Bengaluru,
- G. Soumya Rupa, R&D manager at Broadcom corporation in California, US.
- B. Ranjith, Indian police service (2016), Telangana Cadre, UPSC Rank 555.
- G. Balajose, Lead Technology Engineer, GE energy, Hyderabad.
- V. Praneeth, Senior Software Engineer in Cisco Systems, California, US.
- Ch. Rupesh, Indian police service (2016), Telangana Cadre, UPSC Rank 527.

== See also ==
- Education in India
- List of institutions of higher education in Telangana
