= Ram Miriyala =

Indian playback singer

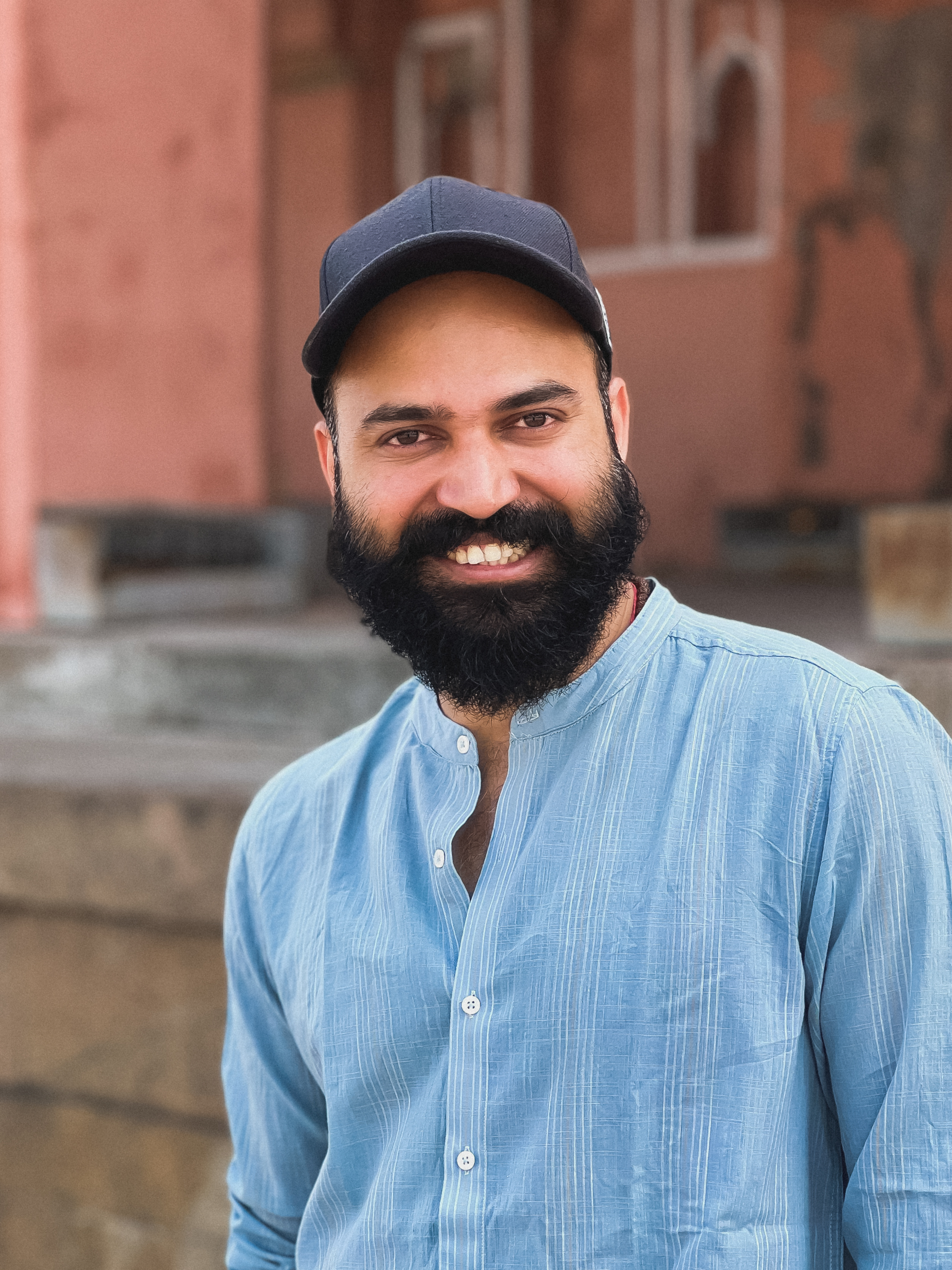

Background information
- Born: 30 October 1987 (age 38); Kolanka, Andhra Pradesh, India
- Genres: Film score; World music; Pop music; Indian folk
- Occupations: Music composer; singer; lyricist; performer; record producer; film scorer
- Instruments: Vocals; Flute
- Years active: 2018–present
- Labels: Aditya Music; Lahari Music; Sony Music

Ram Miriyala is an Indian playback singer, record producer, music composer, film scorer, promo producer and songwriter in Telugu cinema.

== Career ==
Ram Miriyala initially worked in the corporate sector. He has also learned carnatic music for two years and could not continue for personal reasons. He told The New Indian Express that these "two years made him fall in love with music". Later, he continued his career in Radio Mirchi as a promo producer. While working as the promo producer at the Radio Mirchi, in 2018, Ram along with his colleagues decided to form the music band Chowraasta. The primary idea of the band is to sing and produce Telugu folk songs in reggae genre. The band also includes Yashwanth Nag, Bala, Akshay, Anant and Srinivas.

The band started producing original songs in 2019, including "Oorellipota Mama" and "Maya", which became successful. These songs are based on the real-life issues in the society and made him popular due to which, he is commonly called as Chowraasta Ram. Speaking to The News Minute, Ram said that "We are not here for popularity. We are asking questions and hoping that people will think about it. It is an ongoing process and we will speak about issues that are close to our heart". The next year he has sung, composed and written "Cheyi Cheyi Kalapaku Ra" for the band during the COVID-19 lockdown in India. The song is produced to create awareness about the disease and the guidelines to be followed. Ram has stepped out of the band in 2020.

During the initial stage of Chowraasta band, Ram's first recorded song "Vagalaadi" (from the film Brochevarevarura) as a playback singer, which was released in April 2019. Reviewing the film's soundtrack, The Times of India's Neeshita Nyayapati wrote about the song that "It's a classic Vivek Sagar song with a perfect blend of various musical mediums and the vocals, tune, lyrics and music are on-point".

== Discography ==
=== As playback singer ===
List of songs recorded
Year	Work	Song	Composer	Co-artist(s)	Notes
2019	Brochevarevarura	"Vagalaadi"	Vivek Sagar	Vivek Sagar, Balaji Dake, Manisha Eerabathini	
2020	Operation 533295	"Rela Re Rela/Mannapu Kondalona"	Shalem	Anudeep Dev	
2020	Middle Class Melodies	"Sambasiva"	Sweekar Agasthi		
2020	Bomma Blockbuster	"Raaye Nuv Raaye"	Prashanth R Vihari	Muheet Bharti, Manisha Eerabathini	
2021	Jathi Ratnalu	"Chitti"	Radhan		
2021	Paagal	"Paagal"	Radhan	Mama Sing	
2021	Pushpaka Vimanam	"Silakaa"	Ram Miriyala		
2021	Gully Rowdy	"Puttene Prema"	Ram Miriyala		
2021	Sehari	"Sehari"	Prashanth R Vihari	Abhijith	
2021	Vivaha Bhojanambu	"What A Man"	AniVee		
2021	Bheemla Nayak	"Bheemla Nayak"	S. Thaman	Sri Krishna, Prudhvi Chandra	
2021	777 Charlie	"Torture"	Nobin Paul		Telugu version
2021	Manchi Rojulochaie	"Ekkesinde Ekkesinde"	Anup Rubens		
2021	Khiladi	"Title Song"	Devi Sri Prasad		
2021	Anubhavinchu Raja	"Anubhavinchu Raja"	Gopi Sundar		
2022	Chittam Maharani	"Kola Kalla Chinnadhi"	Gowra Hari		
2022	DJ Tillu	"Tillu Anna DJ Pedithe"	Ram Miriyala		
2022	Rowdy Boys	"Ye Zindagi"	Devi Sri Prasad		
2022	Ashoka Vanamlo Arjuna Kalyanam	"Oo Aadapilla"	Jay Krish		
2022	F3	"Lab Dab Lab Dab Dabboo"	Devi Sri Prasad		
2022	Chor Bazaar	"Jada"	Suresh Bobbili		
2022	Nenu Meeku Baaga Kavalsinavaadini	"Lawyer Papa"	Mani Sharma		
2022	Like, Share & Subscribe	"Lachamammo"	Ram Miriyala		
2022	Godse	"Ra Rammandi Uru"	Sandy Addanki		
2022	Panchatantra Kathalu	"Nenemo Mothevari"	Kamran		
2022	First Day First Show	"Nee Navvey"	Radhan		
2022	Liger	"Coka 2.0"	Jaani, Lijo George-DJ Chetas	Geetha Madhuri	
2022	Liger	"Coka 2.0"	Jaani, Lijo George-DJ Chetas	Geetha Madhuri	Tamil version
2022	Prince	"Bimbiliki Pilapi"	Thaman S	Ramya Behara, Sahithi Chaganti	Telugu version
2023			Thaman S		
2023	Veera Simha Reddy	"Suguna Sundari"	Snigdha Sharma		
2023	Waltair Veerayya	"Poonakaalu Loading"	Devi Sri Prasad	Roll Rida	
2023	Das Ka Dhamki	"Mawa Bro"	Ram Miriyala		
2023	Das Ka Dhamki	"Mama Bol"	Ram Miriyala		Hindi version
2023	Balagam	"Potti Pilla"	Bheems Ceciroleo		
2023	Balagam	"Ooru Palletooru"	Bheems Ceciroleo	Mangli	
2023	Dasara	"Chamkeela Angeelesi"	Santhosh Narayanan	Dhee	
2023	Tillu Square	"Ticket Eh Konakunda"	Ram Miriyala		
2023	Raakshasa Kavyam	"Villains"	RR Dhruvan	Rahul Sipligunj, Mangli	
2023	Ooru Peru Bhairavakona	"Humma Humma"	Shekar Chandra		
2023	Raju Yadav	"Raju Yadav Chudu"	Harshavardhan Rameshwar		
2023	Extra Ordinary Man	"Ole Ole Paapaayi"	Harris Jayaraj	Priya Himesh	
2023	Extra Ordinary Man	"Sirraaku Thaandavam"	Harris Jayaraj		
2024	Naa Saami Ranga	"Etthukelli Povaalanipisthunde"	M. M. Keeravani		
2024	Sharathulu Varthisthai	''Kalam Supula Galamra''	Arun Chiluveru		
2024	Geethanjali Malli Vachindi	"Rent Ki Dabbu Ledhu"	Praveen Lakkaraju		
2024	Darling	"Khalasay"	Vivek Sagar	Hanuman Ch	
2024	Aay	"Sufiyana"	Ram Miriyala	Sameera Bharadwaj, Ramya Shree	
2024	Keshava Chandra Ramavath	"Yadi Yadi"	Charan Arjun	Veeha, Kanakavva	
2024	Maruthi Nagar Subramanyam	"Nene Subramanyam"	Kalyan Nayak		
2024	Mechanic Rocky	"I Hate U My Daddy"	Jakes Bejoy		
2024	Utsavam	"First Kiss"	Anup Rubens		
2025	Brahma Anandam	"Village Song"	Sandilya Pisapati		
2025	Baapu	"Allo Neredallo Pilla"	RR Dhruvan		
2025	Dear Uma	"Nivevaro"	Radhan	Sarath Santosh	
2025	Junior	"Update Avvaale"	Devi Sri Prasad		
2025	Raju Gaani Savaal	"Gilasa"	Yashwanth Nag		
2025	Sundarakanda	"Hammayya"	Leon James	Leon James	
2025	Sahakutumbaanaam	"Fake Saales"	Mani Sharma		
2025	Santhana Prapthirasthu	"Santhana PrapthiRasthu Shubhamasthu"	Sunil Kashyap		
2025	Champion	"Gira Gira Gingiraagirey"	Mickey J. Meyer		
2026	Band Melam	"Rajamma"	Vijai Bulganin		
2026	Dacoit: A Love Story	"Chichubuddi"	Bheems Ceciroleo		
2026	Raakaasa	"Rapappa"	Anudeep Dev		
2026	Papam Prathap	"Pillekkadundi"	K. M. Radha Krishnan		

=== As composer ===
List of original soundtracks
Year	Title	Notes
2021	Gully Rowdy	Only one track
2021	Pushpaka Vimanam	Two tracks
2022	DJ Tillu	Only one track
2022	Like, Share & Subscribe	Only one track
2023	Das Ka Dhamki	Only one track
2024	Tillu Square	Two tracks
2024	Raju Yadav	Only one track
2024	Aay	Two tracks

List of original scores
Year	Title	Director
2021	Gully Rowdy	G. Nageswara Reddy
2021	Pushpaka Vimanam	Damodara

=== Singles ===
As lead artist
Year	Song	Composer	Co-artist(s)	Notes
2019	"Saagu Bharuvayena Raita"	Ram Miriyala		
2019	"Oorellipota Mama"	Ram Miriyala		
2019	"Maya"	Ram Miriyala	Yashwanth Nag	
2020	"Cheyi Cheyi Kalapaku Ra"	Ram Miriyala		
2020	"Vinakapothivi Kadara"	Ram Miriyala		composed along with Yashwanth Nag
2020	"Anna Naganna"	Yashwanth Nag	Mangli, Yashwanth Nag	
2020	"Vana Vachinammo"		Yashwanth Nag	
2020	"Jenda Vandhanam"	Ram Miriyala		
2020	"Lambodara"	Ram Miriyala		
2022	"Alai Balai"	Ram Miriyala		
2022	"Ringa Ringa"	Ram Miriyala		
2023	"Kallu Thaaga"	Ram Miriyala		
2023	"Voter Anna Ee Saari Nee Vote Rate Entha?"	Ram Miriyala		
2024	"Shiva Shiva"	Sounds of Isha		
2025	"Naa Praanama"	Ram Miriyala		Also lyricist

As featured artist
Year	Song	Notes
2018	"Layilo – The Breakup Song"	along with Sunny Austin and Chinna Swamy
2018	"Rasaleela"	along with Sunny Austin and Chinna Swamy

=== Music videos ===
Year	Song	Director	Notes
2018	"Layilo – The Breakup Song"		
2018	"Rasaleela"	V Sai Kiran	
2019	"Maya"	Krishna Teja	
2020	"Anna Naganna"	Nagaraju Valalla	
2020	"Jenda Vandhanam"		
2022	"Alai Balai"		
2022	"Ringa Ringa"		
2023	"Kallu Thaaga"	Mama Sing	
2023	"Voter Anna Ee Saari Nee Vote Rate Entha?"	Mama Sing; Rehan Shaik	
2025	"The Sivarapalli Jingaatam"	Rakesh S Narayan	Promotional song for Sivarapalli
2025	"Naa Praanama"	Vinay Shanmukh	

=== As songwriter ===
List of songs with songwriting credits
Year	Song	Work	Composer	Notes
2019	"Oorellipota Mama"		Ram Miriyala	along with Anand Gurram
2019	"Maya"		Ram Miriyala	
2020	"Cheyi Cheyi Kalapaku Ra"		Ram Miriyala	
2021	"Silakaa"	Pushpaka Vimanam	Ram Miriyala	along with Anand Gurram
2022	"Alai Balai"		Ram Miriyala	along with Mama Sing
2022	"Ringa Ringa"		Ram Miriyala	along with Mama Sing
2023	"Kallu Thaaga"		Ram Miriyala	
2025	"Naa Praanama"		Ram Miriyala	along with Anand Gurram

=== Other songs ===
List of other songs
Year	Song	Composer	Notes
2021	"Arrerere Jathi Ratnalu"	Ram Miriyala	Special promotional song for Jathi Ratnalu
2021	"Zee Cinemalu"	Ram Miriyala	Promotional song for Zee Cinemalu, on completing five years
2022	"Matti"	Ram Miriyala	Promotional song for the #Save Soil movement by Sadhguru
2025	"The Sivarapalli Jingaatam"	Ram Miriyala	Promotional song for Sivarapalli

== Awards and nominations ==
Award	Year	Category	Work	Result	Ref.
Filmfare Awards South	2022	Best Male Playback Singer – Telugu	"Chitti" (from Jathi Ratnalu)	Nominated	
Filmfare Awards South	2024	Best Male Playback Singer – Telugu	"Potti Pilla" (from Balagam)	Nominated	
IIFA Utsavam	2024	Best Male Playback Singer – Telugu	"Chamkeela Angeelesi" from (Dasara)	Nominated	
South Indian International Movie Awards	2022	Best Male Playback Singer – Telugu	"Chitti" (from Jathi Ratnalu)	Won	
South Indian International Movie Awards	2023	Best Male Playback Singer – Telugu	"Tillu Anna DJ Pedithe" (from DJ Tillu)	Won	
South Indian International Movie Awards	2023	Best Music Director – Telugu (Note: along with Sricharan Pakala)	DJ Tillu	Nominated	
South Indian International Movie Awards	2024	Best Male Playback Singer – Telugu	"Ooru Palletooru" (from Balagam)	Won	
