= Manisha Eerabathini =

Indian-American playback singer

- Born: Hanamkonda, Telangana, India
- Occupations: Singer, Tollywood film industry
- Years active: 2017 – present

Manisha Eerabathini is an Indian-American playback singer and actress who works in the Telugu film industry.

== Career ==
Her 2017 song "Arere Yekkada" from Nenu Local was a hit and brought recognition to her name and talent.

In 2018, she sang with Roll Rida in the song "Arupu," released as a music video. The song's message and depiction is about the abuse against women. It received critical acclaim. She debuted as an actress with the film Fidaa (2017) directed by Sekhar Kammula, and then appeared in the film Veera Simha Reddy (2023).

== Filmography ==
| Year | Films | Role | Notes |
|---|---|---|---|
| 2017 | Fidaa | Shailu | |
| 2023 | Veera Simha Reddy | Herself | Cameo appearance in "Voice of Europe" music show |

=== Television ===
| Year | Title | Role |
|---|---|---|
| 2014 | Padutha Theeyaga | Contestant |

=== Voice artist ===
| Year | Films | Actress | Notes |
|---|---|---|---|
| 2022 | The American Dream | Neha Krishna | |

== Discography ==
| Year | Film | Song | Composer | Co-singers |
|---|---|---|---|---|
| 2015 | Soukhyam | "Alare Aala" | Anup Rubens | Rahul Pandey |
| 2016 | Gentleman | "Saturday Night Fever" | Mani Sharma | Narendra |
| 2017 | Nenu Local | "Arere Yekkada" | Devi Sri Prasad | Naresh Iyer |
| 2017 | Lakshmi Bomb | "Aggai Vastha Ninne Buggechestha" | Sunil Kashyap | Ashwani |
| 2017 | Lakshmi Bomb | "Lakshmi Bomb" (Title Track) | Sunil Kashyap | Ashwani |
| 2017 | Andhhagadu | "Premika" | Shekar Chandra | Megha Sravanthi |
| 2017 | Mahanubhavudu | "Kiss Me Baby" | S. Thaman | S. Thaman |
| 2018 | Inttelligent | "Na Cell Phone" | S. Thaman | Jaspreet Jasz, Aditya Iyengar |
| 2018 | Chal Mohan Ranga | "Miami" | S. Thaman | Aditi Singh Sharma |
| 2018 | Ee Nagaraniki Emaindhi | "Aagi Aagi" | Vivek Sagar | Anurag Kulkarni |
| 2018 | Veera Bhoga Vasantha Rayalu | "The World is Dying" | Mark K Robin | — |
| 2018 | Savyasachi | "Why Not" | M. M. Keeravani | PVNS Rohit |
| 2018 | Amar Akbar Anthony | "Don Bosco" | S. Thaman | Sri Krishna, Jaspreet Jasz, Hariteja, Ramya Behara |
| 2018 | Antariksham 9000 KMPH | "Telipo Telipo" | Prashanth R Vihari | — |
| 2019 | Brochevarevarura | "Vagalaadi" | Vivek Sagar | Vivek Sagar, Balaji Dake, Ram Miriyala |
| 2020 | Dirty Hari | "Let's Make Love" | Mark K Robin | — |
| 2021 | Raja Vikramarka | "Rama Kanavemira" | Prashanth R Vihari | Anurag Kulkarni |
| 2022 | Sarkaru Vaari Paata | "Sarkaru Vaari Paata Rap Song" | Thaman S | Harika Narayan, MaaHaa, Sravana Bhargavi, Pratyusha Pallapothu, Sri Soumya Varanasi, Sruthi Ranjani |
| 2022 | Thank You | "E Nimisham" | Thaman S | Sri Krishna |
| 2022 | Bomma Blockbuster | "Raaye Acoustic Version" | Prashanth R Vihari | — |
| 2024 | Appudo Ippudo Eppudo | "Kabhi Haa Kabhi Naa" | Sunny M. R. | Krishna Tejasvi, Sunny M. R. |
| 2025 | Champion | "Sallangundaale" | Mickey J. Meyer | Ritesh G Rao |
| 2025 | Champion | "Kalaga Kadhaga" | Mickey J. Meyer | Krishna Tejasvi |
| 2026 | Gaayapadda Simham | "Bride Song" | Sweekar Agasthi | — |
