= Yazin Nizar =

Indian playback singer (born 1990)

Yazin Nizar, known mononymously as Yazin, is an Indian playback singer and music producer . He has sung over 1000 original songs for films in Telugu, Tamil, Malayalam, Kannada and Hindi including some the biggest Indian movies in the discography . He is known for singing the Tamil and Malayalam versions of the Oscar-winning song "Naatu Naatu". His accolades include multiple Mirchi Music Awards and Raga Pratibha awards.

== Early life and career ==
Nizar was born in Kollam, Kerala, India. He began performing live as an adult after participating in and winning televised singing competitions such as Gandharva Sangeetham and Sangeetha Mahayuddham.

Nizar was nominated twice for the Filmfare Award for Best Male Playback Singer – Telugu for “Meghalu Lekunna” from Kumari 21F and “Charusheela” from Srimanthudu at the 63rd Filmfare Awards South.

In 2017, Nizar began his career as an independent musician. His multilingual track "Neeye, Neeve, Neene", composed by Phani Kalyan, was sung in Tamil, Telugu and Kannada.

In 2021, Nizar recorded his debut song for A. R. Rahman in the Tamil film Galatta Kalyanam.

== Awards and nominations ==
Awards and Nominations
Award	Category	Song or Album	Year	Result
MLC Awards	Outstanding Achievement Award - Best Song	"Kanapadava" from the short film Manasanamaha	2020	Winner
Mirchi Music Awards South	Singer of the Decade		2021	Nominated
Mirchi Music Awards South	Album of the year	"Srimanthudu"	2016	Winner (Shared)
Mirchi Music Awards South	Best Vocalist of the Year (Male)	"Meghalu Lekunna" from the film Kumari 21F	2016	Winner
Mirchi Music Awards South	Best Upcoming Singer		2015	Winner
Filmfare Awards South	Best Male Playback Singer - Telugu	"Charusheela" from the film Srimanthudu	2016	Nominated
Filmfare Awards South	Best Male Playback Singer - Telugu	"Meghalu Lekunna" from the film Kumari 21F	2016	Nominated
Oniros Film Awards	Best Song		2020	Nominated (Shared)
New York Movie Awards	Best Original Song		2020	Nominated (Shared)
Venice Film Awards	Best Original Song		2020	Winner (Shared)

== Discography ==
=== Telugu ===
Telugu Discography
Year	Film	Song	Composer
2012	Nanda Nanditha	"Na Hrudayam"	Farhan Roshan
2013	Dheerudu	"Kottandira Melamu"	S. Thaman
2014	Dk Bose	"Maula Maula"	Achu Rajamani
2014	Ra Ra Krishnayya	"Ra Ra Krishnayya"	Achu
2014	Run Raja Run	"Coma Coma"	Ghibran
2014	Run Raja Run	"Manassantha"	Ghibran
2015	Jil	"Jil Jil Manase"	Ghibran
2015	Jil	"Man on Fire"	Ghibran
2015	Cheekati Rajyam	"Cheekati Rajyam"	Ghibran
2015	Uttama Villain	"Sruthi Niyamam"	Ghibran
2015	Uttama Villain	"Thanthanathom"	Ghibran
2015	Uttama Villain	"Srutshti Niyamam"	Ghibran
2015	Uttama Villain	"Na Rudhirapu"	Ghibran
2015	Uttama Villain	"Uthaman Kadhai"	Ghibran
2015	Shivam	"I Love You Too"	Devi Sri Prasad
2015	S/O Satyamurthy	"Seethakalam"	Devi Sri Prasad
2015	Srimanthudu	"Charuseela"	Devi Sri Prasad
2015	Columbus	"Galullo"	Jithin Roshan
2015	Loafer	"Nuvvedusthunte"	Sunil Kashyap
2015	Loafer	"Jiya Jale Jale"	Sunil Kashyap
2015	Kumari 21F	"Meghalu Lekunna"	Devi Sri Prasad
2015	Abbayitho Ammayi	"Okkasari"	Ilayaraja
2016	Shourya	"O Manasa"	Veda Giri
2016	Tuntari	"Diamond Girl"	Sai Karthik
2016	Savitri	"Fly like a bird"	Shravan
2016	Run	"Bujji Bujjikonda"	Sai Karthik
2016	Oka Manasu	"O Manasa Cheruvaga"	Sunil Kashyap
2016	Bichagadu (D)	"Oka Pootta Annam"	Vijay Antony
2016	Babu Bangaram	"Raaka Raaka"	Ghibran
2016	L7	"So So Baby"	Aravind Shankar
2016	Janatha Garage	"Apple Beauty"	Devi Sri Prasad
2016	Hyper	"Comeback"	Ghibran
2016	Appatlo Okadundevadu	"Tomorrow"	Sai Karthik
2016	Bhetaludu	"Ladukio"	Vijay Antony
2016	Bhetaludu	"Jayalaksmi"	Vijay Antony
2016	Sapthagiri Express	"Rivvala"	Bulganin
2016	Single	"Rakumara-Arjun"	Phani Kalyan
2016	Single	"Neeve"	Phani Kalyan
2016	Eedu Gold Ehe	"Mechans Gold Veedu"	Mahati Swara Sagar
2016	Ekkadiki Pothavu Chinnavada	"Chirunama Thana Chirunama"	Shekar Chandra
2017	Winner	"Sitara"	S. Thaman
2017	O Pilla Nee Valla	"Pranam Poye"	Madhu Ponnas
2017	O Pilla Nee Valla	"Bill Gates Aina"	Madhu Ponnas
2017	Rendu Rellu Aaru	"Chilipi Manasu"	Vijay Bulganin
2017	Gunturodu	"Promise"	DJ Vasanth
2017	Gunturodu	"Padhe Padhe"	DJ Vasanth
2017	Venkatapuram	''Egire Egire''	Achu
2017	Goutham Nanda	''Zindgi Na Milegi"	S. Thaman
2017	Yaman	"Devude Rasina"	Vijay Antony
2017	Premika	"Deveri Chirunavve"	Dilip Bandaari
2017	Raja The Great	"Allabe Allabe"	Sai Karthik
2017	Next Nuvve	"Ala Meda Mida"	Sai Karthik
2017	Mental Madhilo	"Cheliyo Chellako"	Prashanth R Vihari
2017	Vunnadhi Okate Zindagi	"Life is a Rainbow"	Devi Sri Prasad
2018	Sketch (D)	"Evare Evare"	S. Thaman
2018	Ye Mantram Vesave	"Ye Vela Choosano Kani"	Abdus Samad
2018	Sivakasipuram	"Inaluga"	Pavan Shesha
2018	Rangula Ratnam	"Emaindi Bujjikanna"	Sricharan Pakala
2018	Manasuku Nachindi	"Rey Idi"	Radhan
2018	Masakali	"Anaganaga"	Mihirams
2018	Masakali	"Oko Kshanam"	Mihirams
2018	Satya Gang	"Chirujalle Kurisele"	Prabhas
2018	Chalo	"Chal Godava"	Mahati Swara Sagar
2018	Chalo	"Ammaye Chalo Antu"	Mahati Swara Sagar
2018	Chal Mohan Ranga	"Very Very Sad"	S. S. Thaman
2018	Kee (D)	"Pakkakochi"	Vishal Chandrashekhar
2018	Pantham	"First Time"	Gopi Sundar
2018	MLA	"Most Wanted Abbayi"	Mani Sharma
2018	Nene Mukhya Mantri Naithe	"Vilagipoola Sandanam"	Phani Kalyan
2018	Krishnarjuna Yudham	"Ela Ela"	Hiphop Tamizha
2018	Tej I Love You	"Hello Pilla"	Gopi Sundar
2018	Naa... Nuvve	"Nijama Manasa"	Sharreth
2018	Pantham	"First Time"	Gopi Sundar
2018	Bharat Ane Nenu	"O Vasumathi"	Devi Sri Prasad
2018	Lover	"Naalo Chilipi Kala"	Sai Karthik
2018	Nartanasala	"Ela Netho"	Mahati Swara Sagar
2018	Nartanasala	"Dhol Bhaje"	Mahati Swara Sagar
2018	Devadas	"Manasedo Vethukuthu Undi"	Mani Sharma
2018	Hello Guru Prema Kosame	"Peddha Peddha Kallathoti"	Devi Sri Prasad
2018	Antariksham 9000 KMPH	"Samayama"	Prashanth R Vihari
2019	Meriseti Merupalle	"Meriseti Merupalle"	Sindhu K Prasad
2019	Nivaasi	"Jago Jago"	Charan Arjun
2019	Edaina Jaragocchu	"Cheliya"	Srikanth Pendyala
2019	Sharabha	"Ottesi Chebutha"	Koti
2019	Ninnu Thalachi	"Nee Manasu Pai"	Yellendar Mahaveera
2019	Chikati Gadilo Chithakotudu	"Party Song"	Balamurali Balu
2019	Nagakanya	"Raasagi"	Shabir
2019	118	"Chandamame"	Shekar Chandra
2019	Killer	"Champodde"	Simon K. King
2019	Abhinetri 2	"Love Love"	Sam C. S.
2019	Undiporaadhey	"Tholisari Ninnu"	Sabu Varghese
2019	1st Rank Raju	"Ayyo Rama"	Kiran Ravindranath
2019	Evadu Thakkuva Kadu	"Life is just a casino"	Hari Gowra, Sai Karthik
2019	Kousalya Krishnamurthy	"Muddabanthi"	Dhibu Ninan Thomas
2019	Majili	"Naa Gundello"	Gopi Sunder
2019	Maharshi	"Nuvve Samastham"	Devi Sri Prasad
2019	Ninu Veedani Needanu Nene	"Ninu Veedani Needanu Nene"	S. Thaman
2020	V	"Manasu Maree"	Amit Trivedi
2020	V	"Ranga Rangeli"	Amit Trivedi
2020	Parari	"Siggu Siggu"	Mahit Narayan
2020	Yemaipothaney	"Naa Manasukathe"	Vasanth G
2020	Ja	"Nee Choope"	Venki
2020	IIT Krishnamurthy	"Megham Tho Megham"	Naresh Kumaran
2021	Tongi Tongi Chudamaku Chandamama	"Challani Neeru"	Hari Gowra
2021	Kannullo Kalalunte	"Idhe Ma Katha"	Sunil Kashyap
2021	Gem	"Vsosi Vayyarive"	Sunil Kashyap
2021	Uppena	"Ranguladhukunna"	Devi Sri Prasad
2021	WWW	"Kannulu Chedire"	Simon K King
2021	Surya	"Neetho Unta"	Ajay Arasada
2021	Dhagad	"Kittayya"	Poonik
2021	Gully Rowdy	"Visakhapatnam Lo Rowdy Gaado"	Sai Karthik
2021	Mugguru Monagallu	"O Pilla Nee Valla"	Suresh Bobbili
2021	Maro Prasthanam	"Dharanilo Dharma Sthapanakai"	Sunil Kashyap
2021	Raja Vikramarka	"Kaalam Kadalai"	Prashanth R Vihari
2021	Bro	"Anandham"	Shekar Chandra
2021	Missing	"Hola Hola"	Ajay Arasada
2022	Rowdy Boys	"Okariki Okarani (Rock Version)"	Devi Sri Prasad
2022	Nee Venakale	"Karan Arjun"	Roshan Salur
2022	Samrat Pritviraj (D)	"Hadhu Cheripey"	Shankar-Ehsan-Loy
2022	Telisina Valu	"Nerajana"	Pouly
2022	Sehari	"Naa Disha Neeve"	Prashanth R Vihari
2022	Stand Up Rahul	"Padhaa"	Sweekar Agasthi
2022	Mr. Preganant	"Remainado"	Shravan Bharadwaj
2022	Aadavallu Meeku Johaarlu	"Oh My Aadhya"	Devi Sri Prasad
2022	Throwback 2020	"Manasunu Varincheti"	Pauly. M
2022	Take diversion (D)	"Neevu Leni Nenila"	Jose Franklin
2022	Shamshera (D)	"Nee Paina Picchi Preme Kadhaa"	Mithoon
2022	Shamshera (D)	"Aame Kallu"	Mithoon
2022	Kinnerasani	"I Get So High"	Mahati Swara Sagar
2022	Sita Ramam	"Epudo Ninnu"	Vishal Chandrashekhar
2022	Highway	"Oohincha Ledhu Kadhe"	Simon K King
2022	Highway	"Kommallo"	Simon K King
2023	Sony Music	"Vellake"	Bharatt-Saurabh
2023	Animal (D)	"Kashmeeru"	Manan Bhardwaj
2023	Kanulu Therichinaa Kanulu Moosinaa	"Marhabha"	Gowra Hari
2024	Music Shop Murthy	"Vadiley Vadiley"	Pavan
2025	Tuk Tuk	"Koyilamma"	Santhu Omkar
2025	Single	"Shilpi Yevaro"	Vishal Chandrashekhar
2025	Junior	"Junior Anthem"	Devi Sri Prasad
2025	War 2 (D)	"Salam Anali"	Pritam
2025	Krishna Leela	"Asalenduke"	Bheems Ceciroleo
2026	Nari Nari Naduma Murari	"Darsanamey"	Vishal Chandrashekhar

=== Tamil ===
Tamil Discography
Year	Film	Song	Composer
2012	Paradesi	"Avatha Payya"	G. V. Prakash
2013	Theeya Velai Seiyyanum Kumaru	"Melliya Saaral"	C Satya
2013	Konjam kofee konjam kadhal	"Sakkarakkatti"	Phani kalyan
2013	Adithalam	"Oru Chaan Vayithukku"	Taj Noor
2013	Thee Kulikkum Pachai Maram	"Kathaikalile"	Jitin Roshan
2014	Goli Soda	"Jananam Jananam"	Sn Arunagiri
2014	Goli Soda	"Oyyale Oyya"	Sn Arunagiri
2014	Thirumanam Enum Nikkah	"Yaro Ival Yaro Ival"	Ghibran
2014	Panduvam	"Ivanai Boomi"	Niro
2014	Davani Katru	"Sarugena Sarugena"	Udayan Victor
2014	Vella Kakka Manja Kuruvi	"Adadada"	Saesan
2014	Yaazh	"Panamarakkada"	Sn Arunagiri
2014	Yaazh	"Poovarasam Poovay"	Sn Arunagiri
2014	Yaazh	"Vizhi Vanile"	Sn Arunagiri
2014	Kadhal Solla Aasai	"En Uyire Née"	M. M. Srilekha
2014	Nedunchaalai	"Injadhea"	C. Sathya
2014	Poojai	"Soda Bottle"	Yuvan Shankar Raja
2014	Kaaval	"Kaval Theme"	G. V. Prakash Kumar
2014	Mel	"Ooru Enga Ooru"	Udayan Victor
2014	Manam Konda Katal	"Yaar Ival"	Vikram Varman
2015	India Pakistan	"Indian Na Pakistan Née"	Deena
2015	Katham Katham	"Idhu Yenna"	Tajnoor
2015	Chennai Ungalai Anbudan Varaverkirathu	"Velicham Mazhai"	Raja
2015	Uttama Villain	"Mutharasan Kadhai"	Ghibran
2015	Uttama Villain	"Uthaman Kadhai"	Ghibran
2015	Uttama Villain	"Saagavaram"	Ghibran
2015	Kirumi	"Boom Boom Bootam"	K
2015	Natpadhigaram 79	"Penne Née Kadhal"	Deepak Nilambur
2015	Thoongaa Vanam	"Neeye Unakku Raja"	Ghibran
2015	Pasanga 2	Pookkalai Killi Vanth	Arrol Corelli
2016	Janatha Garage (D)	"Apple Beauty"	Devi Sri Prasad
2016	Aarambamey Attakaasam (D)	"Thiruda Thiruda"	Jaya K Doss
2016	Aarambamey Attakaasam (D)	"Yeandi Yenga Pona"	Jaya K Doss
2016	Aarambamey Attakaasam (D)	"Yenna Sonna"	Jaya K Doss
2016	Nayyapudai	"Ith Pol Oru Sukam"	Taj Noor
2016	Pichaikkaran	"Oru Velai Sottrukkaga"	Vijay Antony
2016	Kanithan	"Iviralgal"	Sivamani
2016	Paisa	"Paisa"	James
2016	Selvi	"Raka Raka"	Ghibran
2016	Saithan	"Jayalakshmi"	Vijay Antony
2016	Saithan	"Ladukio"	Vijay Antony
2016	Neeye	"Neeye"	Phani Kalyan
2017	Adhe Kangal	"Itdho Thaanagave"	Ghibran
2017	Kombay	"Aathadi Aatha"	Deniz
2017	Yaman	Kadavul Ezhuthum	Vijay Antony
2017	Magalir Mattum	"Bullet Song"	Ghibran
2017	Yaagan	"Neethan En Bhoomi"	Niro Pirabakaran
2017	Sathya	"Yavvana"	Simon K. King
2017	Sathya	"Yavvana" (Reprise)	Simon K. King
2017	Nedunalvaadai	"Yedho Aagippochu"	Jose Franklin
2017	Nedunalvaadai	"Ore Oru Kanpaarvai"	Jose Franklin
2018	Sketch	"Cheeni Chillale"	S. Thaman
2018	Ratsasan	"Mayangal Nanada"	Ghibran
2018	Panam Pathnonnum Seyyum	"Rocksong"	Al Aalij
2018	Panam Pathnonnum Seyyum	"Verikonda"	Al Aalij
2018	Raatchasan	"Piriyame Piriyame"	Ghibran
2018	Aan Devathai	"Pogumidam"	Ghibran
2019	Kanne Kalaimaane	"Neenda Malare"	Yuvan Shankar Raja
2019	Kolaigaran	"Kollathey"	Simon K. King
2019	Kannadi	"Kannai Katti"	S Thaman
2019	Market Raja MBBS	"Kannale Kannale"	Simon K King
2020	Tumba	"Kelaumbuda Nanba"	Santosh Dhayanidhi
2020	Dharala Prabhu	"Pularum"	Vivek-Mervin
2020	Maara	"Oru Arai Unadhu"	Ghibran
2021	Maara	"O Ajooba"	Ghibran
2021	WWW	"Minnalai"	Simon K King
2021	Oh Manapenne	"Sakiye"	Vishal Chandrashekhar
2021	Galatta Kalyaanam	"Kaadhalai Solla Mudiyatha"	AR Rahman
2022	RRR (D)	"Naatu Koothu"	M. M. Keeravani
2022	Adade Sundara	"Thandanaanandha (Promo Song)"	Vivek Sagar
2022	Shamshera (D)	"Ondraagudhae"	Mithoon
2022	Shamshera (D)	"Theeporiyae"	Mithoon
2022	Shamshera (D)	"Kannale"	Mithoon
2022	Shamshera (D)	"Shamshera Thoandrumboadhu"	Mithoon
2022	Visithiran	"Deva Emmai Kappaye"	GV Prakash Kumar
2022	Samrat Prithviraj (D)	"Azhaikiradhe"	Shankar–Ehsaan–Loy
2022	Vallavan Vaguthatada	"Vallavan Vaguthatada"	Sagishna Xavier
2022	Sita Ramam (D)	"Urayum Theeyil"	Vishal Chandrashekhar
2022	Poikkal Kuthirai	"Thadai Udayatha"	D Immaan
2022	Captain	"Kylaa"	D Immaan
2022	Raangi	"Panithuli"	C. Sathya
2023	Animal (D)	"Theeraadha"	Manan Bhardwaj
2024	Kanguva	"Yolo"	Devi Sri Prasad
2025	War 2 (D)	"Kalaaba"	Pritam

=== Malayalam ===
Year	Film	Song	Composer
2002	Punarjani	"Srithakamalakucha"	Suresh Manimala
2009	Nalla Pattukare	"May Junemasam"	Sharreth
2009	The Gambler	"Re Rere"	Chakri
2009	The Gambler	"Ponmanimuthe"	Chakri
2010	The Metro	"Dai Eechakkdavandi"	Shaan Rahman
2010	The Metro	"Maanmizi Poo Maine"	Shaan Rahman
2010	The Metro	"Maanmizhi"	Shaan Rahman
2012	Spanish Masala	"Ayyoayyo"	Vidyasagar
2013	Thattathin Marayathu	"Pranantenalangal	Shaan Rahman
2013	Kaashh	Daivathinvaramulla"	Sandeep Pillai
2013	Ozhimuri	"Vakkinullilevingummouname"	Bijibal
2013	101 Weddings	"Sajalamay"	Deepak Dev
2013	Musafir	"Sandhya"	Ouseppachan
2013	Kili Poyi	"Sajalamay"	Rahul Raj
2014	London bridge	"Chinni Chinni"	Rahul Raj
2014	Friendship	"Anuraagathin"	Farhaan Roshan
2014	Konthayum Poonoolum	"Nenjil"	Mejo Joseph
2014	Vasanthathinte Kanal Vazhikalil	"Chethi Minukki"	A. R. Reihana
2014	Manja	"Pattam Nokkii"	Jecin George
2014	Rajadhiraja	"Dhandhan"	Karthik Raja
2014	Mylanchi Monchulla Veedu	"Puthanilanjik"	Afzal Yusuf
2014	Vikramadithyan	"Anthichoppil"	Bijibal
2014	Cousins	"Kolussu Thenni"	M. Jayachandran
2014	Angry Babies in Love	"Zindgil"	Bijibal
2014	S/O Satyamurthy (D)	"Neelakasha"	Devi Sri Prasad
2014	Bhaiyya Bhaiyya	"Veyil Poyaal"	Vidyasagar
2015	Jilebi	"Yatra"	Bijibal
2016	Aana Mayil Ottakam	"Oru Pidi Swapnangal Than"	Rakesh
2017	Kuttikalundu Sookshikkuka	"Himagiri"	Bijibal
2017	Adventures of Omanakuttan	"TARARARA"	Dawn Vincent
2017	C/O Saira Banu	"Chakkikochamme"	Mejo Joseph
2017	Viswasapoorvam Mansoor	"Ariyaaykayaalalla"	Ramesh Narayan
2017	Viswasapoorvam Mansoor	"Nenjiladakkakal"	Ramesh Narayan
2017	Baahubali: The Conclusion (D)	"Bali Bali Bahubali"	M. M. Keeravani
2018	Kuttanadan Marpappa	"Palnila Taarame"	Rahul Raj
2018	Old is Gold	"Vadivaalinu"	Jubair Mohammed
2019	Magical Moments	"Chuvappu"	Mejo Joseph
2019	Mask	"Var Vidhumukhi"	Gopi Sundar
2019	Kodathi Samaksham Balan Vakeel	"Thaniye Itha"	Rahul Raj
2019	Saaho (D)	"Psycho Saiyaan"	Tanishk Bagchi
2019	Marconi Mathai	"Palnilavinum"	M. Jayachandran
2019	Marconi Mathai	"Nanba"	M. Jayachandran
2019	Finals	"Parakkam"	Kailas Menon
2019	Parkam Reprise	"Kailas Menon"	
2019	Edakkad Battalion 06	"Sehanai Song"	Kailas Menon
2019	Thakkol	"Akashathin Vellivelicham"	M. Jayachandran
2019	Mamangam	Promo Song	M. Jayachandran
2022	Aarattu (D)	"Onnam Kandam"	Rahul Raj
2022	RRR (D)	"Karinthol"	M. M. Keeravani
2022	Sita Ramam (D)	"Ariyum Thorum"	Vishal Chandrashekhar
2023	Animal (D)	"Kashmirin Saanu"	Manan Bhardwaj
2024	Lucky Baskhar (D)	"Mindathe"	G. V. Prakash Kumar
2024	Kanguva (D)	"Yolo"	Devi Sri Prasad
2025	Identity	"Cyclone Central"	Jakes Bejoy

=== Kannada ===
Kannada discography
Year	Film	Song	Composer
2012	Kal Manja	"Loveletter"	Emil Mohammed
2014	Pungidasai	"Chendirane"	Farhaan Roshan
2014	Savaari 2	"Ninna Danigagi"	Manikanth Kadri
2014	Namo Bhootatma	"Nina Chanda"	Farhaan Roshan
2014	Power	"Dham Powere"	S. Thaman
2015	Jaathre	"Neenillada"	Manikanth Kadri
2016	Neene	"Neene"	Phani Kalyan
2017	Rogue	"Ee Sarasa"	Sunil Kashyap
2020	Navratna	"Muddu"	Vengi
2021	RRR (D)	"Dosti"	M. M. Keeravani
2021	Oh My Love	"Enaytho Kaane"	Charan Arjun
2023	Animal (D)	"Kaashmira Thaana"	Manan Bhardwaj
2026	Gharga	"Neenu Nanage"	R. P. Patnaik
