= Varun Reddy =

Indian film director

- Reddy addressing the audience at What The Mic 5.0 event in September 2026.
- Education: Jawaharlal Nehru Technological University, Hyderabad (B.Arch.); Annapurna College of Film and Media (M.A.)
- Occupations: Film director, screenwriter, architect, animator, lyricist
- Years active: 2020–present
- Known for: Psych Siddhartha

Varun Reddy is an Indian film director, screenwriter, and architect who works in Telugu cinema. Trained as an architect, he later moved into filmmaking, making his directorial debut with a coming-of-age romantic comedy Psych Siddhartha (2026).

== Early life and education ==
Varun Reddy was raised in Hyderabad. He holds a Bachelor of Architecture (B.Arch) degree from Jawaharlal Nehru Technological University, Hyderabad (JNTU), and is a registered architect with the Council of Architecture in India. He worked professionally as an architect in Bengaluru before transitioning to filmmaking. He subsequently earned a Master of Arts in Filmmaking from the Annapurna College of Film and Media.

== Career ==
Reddy initially gained recognition after winning the Best Director and Best Short Film awards at a local 48 Hours Short Film Contest using a mobile phone camera.

In 2020, Reddy wrote and directed his first independent feature-length project, a romantic comedy titled Manishi Brathuku Inthe, which deals with themes of clinical depression. The film has not been released. It received media attention following the release of its promotional indie rap track "Mem Cinema Theesinam", which featured vocals by rapper Roll Rida and filmmaker Tharun Bhascker.

Reddy made his theatrical directorial debut with Psych Siddhartha, released on 1 January 2026. He wrote and directed the film and also served as its animation director, in addition to writing the lyrics for two songs, "Blue Yellow" and "Mohamaatam." Starring Nandu and Yamini Bhaskar, the film follows a protagonist rebuilding his life alongside a single mother. The film was bought and released under Suresh Productions and Spirit Media, with veteran producer D. Suresh Babu publicly praising the team's "special effort."

The Times of India noted that Reddy approached the film Psych Siddhartha with an "offbeat sensibility", calling it a "quirky dramedy of chaos, grit and second chances". The review praised the film's dark humor, fast-paced editing, and attempt to cater to a "Gen-Z audience". Similarly, The Hindu commended Reddy for delivering an "edgy relationship drama" and ushering in a "promising voice that's eager to push the boundaries of storytelling".

== Filmography ==
Year	Title	Director	Writer	Notes
2020	Manishi Brathuku Inthe	Yes	Yes	Unreleased independent project
2026	Psych Siddhartha	Yes	Yes	Theatrical feature debut; also animation director and lyricist
