= Adhugo =

Film directed by Ravi Babu

- Theatrical release poster
- Directed by: Ravi Babu
- Written by: Ravi Babu
- Produced by: Ravi Babu; Suresh Babu
- Starring: Nabha Natesh; Rakesh Rachakonda; Abhishek Varma
- Cinematography: N. Sudhakar Reddy
- Edited by: Balla Sathyanarayana
- Music by: Prashanth R Vihari
- Production companies: Flying Frogs; Suresh Productions
- Distributed by: Suresh Productions
- Release date: 7 November 2018
- Country: India
- Language: Telugu

Adhugo is a 2018 Indian Telugu-language fantasy comedy film written and directed by Ravi Babu. It stars Nabha Natesh, Rakesh Rachakonda, and Abhishek Varma. The film follows a piglet named Bunty as the protagonist.

It is India's first film featuring a live-action 3D animated title character.

== Plot ==
Bunty, a cute piglet gets misplaced via mail and lands in the hands of Raji and Rakesh Rachakonda looking for their lost puppy, A gang led by Sixpack Shankar (Ravi Babu) and a few other Gangsters are also after the piglet things go out of hand, how the piglet evades them all forms the rest of the story.

== Cast ==
- Ravi Babu as Six Pack Shakti
- Nabha Natesh as Raji
- Rakesh Rachakonda
- Abhishek Varma

== Soundtrack ==
Adhugo

Soundtrack album by Prashanth R Vihari
- Released: 2018
- Recorded: 2018
- Genre: Soundtrack
- Length: 8:47
- Label: Mango Music
- Producer: Prashanth R Vihari

Prashanth R Vihari chronology
| Mental Madhilo (2017) | Adhugo (2018) | Chi La Sow (2018) |

Music was composed by Prashanth R Vihari and released on Mango Music.

All lyrics are written by Bhaskarabhatla Ravi Kumar.

Track List
| No. | Title | Singer(s) | Length |
|---|---|---|---|
| 1. | "Adhugo" | Riddhi | 2:17 |
| 2. | "Stupid Stupid Boyfriend" | Riddhi | 3:15 |
| 3. | "Raji Raji" | L. V. Revanth | 3:15 |
| Total length: | | | 8:47 |

== Reviews ==
The film generally received poor reviews with critics labelling it as poorly executed and not living up to the hype.
