= Psych Siddhartha =

2026 Indian Telugu film by Varun Reddy

- Theatrical release poster
- Directed by: Varun Reddy
- Written by: Varun Reddy
- Produced by: Nandu; Shyam Sunder Reddy Thudi
- Starring: Nandu; Yamini Bhaskar
- Cinematography: K Prakash Reddy
- Edited by: Prateek Nuti
- Music by: Smaran Sai
- Production companies: Spirit Media; Nanduness; Keep Rolling Pictures
- Release date: 1 January 2026
- Running time: 120 minutes
- Country: India
- Language: Telugu

Psych Siddhartha is a 2026 Indian Telugu-language comedy drama film written and directed by Varun Reddy. The film stars Nandu and Yamini Bhaskar.

The film was theatrically released on 1 January 2026.

== Cast ==
- Nandu as Siddhartha Reddy
- Yamini Bhaskar as Shravya
- Narasimha S
- Priyanka Rebekah Srinivas as Trisha
- Sukesh Reddy as Mansoor
- Wadekar Narsing
- Bobby Ratakonda as Shravya's husband
- Sakshi Atree Chaturvedi
- Mounika
- Pradyumna Billuri

== Production ==
The film was produced under the banners of Keep Rolling Pictures and Nanduness, and was later bought by Suresh Productions and Spirit Media, with its theatrical distribution rights handled by Asian Suresh Entertainments. Producer D. Suresh Babu publicly stated that the filmmakers "worked hard and taken risks, but their passion is evident", noting that industry figures like K. Raghavendra Rao appreciated the film during a screening. He added, "After Pelli Choopulu and C/o Kancharapalem, this is another film made with special effort, and that’s why I wanted to support it."

== Music ==
The background score and songs were composed by Smaran Sai.

Track listing
No.	Title	Lyrics	Singer(s)	Length
1.	"Blue Yellow"	Varun Reddy, Rohith M	Jassie Gift	1:56
2.	"Dhum Thakum"	Kasarla Shyam	Jassie Gift	5:34
3.	"Mohamaatam"	Niklesh Sunkoji, Varun Reddy	Sravya Kothalanka	4:30
4.	"Painting Song"	Manoj Kumar Juloori	Smaran Sai, Baby Manasvini, Baby Sankeertana	3:47
5.	"Friendship Song"	Manoj Kumar Juloori	Wilson Herald, Sarathy	2:51
6.	"Yedha Okka Prayamu"	Ashok Anand	Krishna Tejasvi	2:18

== Release and reception ==
Psych Siddhartha was initially scheduled to release on 12 December 2025, but later released on 1 January 2026.

Sangeetha Devi Dundoo of The Hindu noted the performances of Nandu and Yamini Bhaskar, stating that the film "demands some patient viewing initially but it shows how a simple relationship drama can be presented for a new-age audience." She further highlighted the narrative's distinct tonal shift, describing the opening portions as an unconventional and edgy adult comic book style before transitioning into a grounded drama focused on mutual healing. Sanjana Pulugurtha of The Times of India rated the film 3.5 out of 5, appreciating the urban setting, background score, and dialogues; the review praised the narrative progression, characterizing the second half as a character-driven journey leaning on emotional evolution rather than basic spectacle. In contrast, Suresh Kavirayani of The New Indian Express rated it 2 out of 5 and wrote that, "the predictable, formulaic plot lacks emotional depth, and the film becomes tedious".
