= Masooda =

2022 film by Sai Kiran

- Theatrical release poster
- Directed by: Sai Kiran
- Written by: Sai Kiran
- Produced by: Rahul Yadav Nakka
- Starring: Sangeetha; Thiruveer; Kavya Kalyanram; Subhalekha Sudhakar
- Cinematography: Nagesh Banell
- Edited by: Jeswin Prabhu
- Music by: Prashanth R Vihari
- Production company: Swadharm Entertainment
- Distributed by: Sri Venkateswara Creations
- Release date: 18 November 2022
- Running time: 160 minutes
- Country: India
- Language: Telugu
- Box office: est. ₹13 crore

Masooda is a 2022 Indian Telugu-language supernatural horror film written and directed by debutant Sai Kiran, and produced by Rahul Yadav Nakka through the Swadharm Entertainment. The film stars Sangeetha, Thiruveer, Kavya Kalyanram, and Subhalekha Sudhakar. The film was released on 18 November 2022, opened to positive reviews from critics and audiences, alike, and became a commercial success.

== Plot ==
In 1989, Chittoor, Fardeen clandestinely attempts to help his younger brother Faizal in leaving the village but a mysterious woman gives them a chase through sugarcane fields, detains them and takes them to a ruined bungalow in the forest. Witnessing this, the brothers' relative Nargis notifies the siblings' elder brother Mir of it and together, they head to the bungalow for rescuing them. They meet with an accident due to a falling tree amidst heavy rain, that renders an eye of Nargis to be damaged. Meanwhile, the woman performs Black magic on the brothers and takes assistance from another person to engage in human sacrifice.

In 1999, Hyderabad, Mir and Nargis arrive at a building with a group of men, holding a divine Chaadar (blanket) and a dagger. They find few of their acquaintances under spell of Black magic, behaving insanely. The next morning, Police find the corpse of a woman tied to a tree, brutally stabbed to death.

In 2022, Neelam and her daughter Nazia are tenants in an apartment behind the building, where the woman was murdered and their sole confidant is their neighbour Gopi, who is employed in a software company and constantly tries to woo his colleague Mini. Neelam has separated from her abusive husband Abdul several years ago but still pays him not to be involved in their lives while Mir is seen following Nazia and Abdul. Mini and Gopi arrange for a date at Gopi's home but they are interrupted by Neelam, who seeks Gopi's help as Nazia has been behaving weirdly. As Gopi rushes to check on her, Mini leaves disappointed. Horrified by Nazia's strange conduct, Gopi suspects that she is possessed by a ghost and next morning, both of them take Nazia to a psychiatrist, who concludes that Nazia's mental condition is quite normal. Neelam and Gopi meet Alauddin, assistant of a popular exorcist Rizwan Baba, who gives them a Ta'wiz to be tied on Nazia's hand as that would create a positive impact on Nazia's mental state, declaring that her behaviour during that night cannot mean her being really possessed.

Nazia's teacher taunts her for scoring the least score in examinations and remarks that Ta'wiz cannot help her study. Agitated, Nazia throws the Ta'wiz away allowing the supernatural entity to conquer her mind. Mir visits her at her college, touches her hand and sees several terrifying visions that cause him to vomit blood and meet with an accident after leaving the college. Yuvraj, the son of Neelam and Gopi's landlord, finds himself thrown into panic when he spots Nazia eating garbage and conducting herself ghostly. Broken by her daughter's condition, Neelam takes her to a hospital with Gopi's help and the latter brings Alauddin to tie another Ta'wiz for Nazia. However, Nazia turns unmanageable, speaks badly and displays excessive strength trying to resist Alauddin from tying the Ta'wiz but he manages to do so. When he touches Nazia's bracelet, he visualizes horrific events like Mir did and declares that he cannot desist what is haunting Nazia; he insists they meet Rizwan for finding a solution. Doctors suggest that Nazia undergo Electroconvulsive therapy but Neelam opposes the idea and takes her daughter to Rizwan.

Rizwan suggests that a ritual should be performed on Nazia and that would need a man related by blood to her, revealing to Neelam and Gopi that a spirit is trying to possess Nazia. Neelam seeks Abdul but he demands money for attending to their needs. Rizwan visits Nazia and Neelam at their apartment and suspects that something is amiss in the building behind the apartment. When he looks around the place he spots a spirit of the mysterious woman. From Neelam, Rizwan perceives that tenants often use the path through the building due to road blockage. Upon being asked by Rizwan, Gopi inquires land dealers to learn that a woman, Masooda Bi, was murdered in that building in 1991 by her husband Khaja and the latter was not found. Mir, Khaja's elder brother, arrived seeking the property but left when the Police tried to implicate him in the case. Masooda's corpse, which was buried was also taken away and has not been found. Rizwan informs Neelam that the bracelet Nazia wears is of the ghost which caused it to impose its control on her. She apparently found the bracelet in the building where Masooda was murdered. However, as it is dangerous to remove the bracelet now, Rizwan suggests to let it be until the right time comes. Gopi ignores a trip to Goa with Mini to succour Neelam and Nazia, straining his relationship with her while Nazia, under the control of spirit, stabs Gopi leaving him terrorized. Upon being compelled by his concerned friend, Gopi refuses to help Neelam, leaving her all alone. However, Gopi soon realizes his mistake and decides to help them nevertheless. He meets Abdul but the latter demands 50,000 INR for attending the ritual and also accuses Gopi of having an affair with Neelam, causing the former to physically assault him.

Gopi later travels to Chittoor for finding further details about Mir and Masooda. Perceiving that Mir died due to an accident recently, he meets Nargis who initially denies any help but when he requests them by telling about Nazia's situation, she accepts. Gopi finds a portrait of woman he had seen in Abdul's home and in Mir's house too and realizes that the portrait is of Mir's wife. Gopi realizes that Abdul is Mir's son and Nazia is his granddaughter and is unaware to both of them. Nargis narrates that Mir lived with his wife, a young son, aged father and three loving younger brothers: Khaja, Fardeen and Faizal; all of them lived prosperously by cultivating sugarcane and trading in horses. The family had adopted an orphaned Nargis, considering her as their own. Fardeen went to Hyderabad for studying in a university but returned after marrying Masooda, which was a great disappointment to Mir and Nargis who suspected Masooda of harbouring ill-intentions. Mir soon realized that Masooda was performing Black Magic to attain evil powers and sacrificed humans for it. While he was perplexed thinking on how to inform this to his family, he perceived that an extra-marital affair was brewing between Masooda and Khaja. Mir tried to warn Khaja but the latter was completely under control of Masooda and refused to heed to him. It took less time for the family and village to discover Masooda's acts which inflicted deadly diseases on the villagers. Fardeen tried to help Faizal escape but they were captured by Masooda, who sacrificed them with Khaja's assistance and desisted Mir and Nargis from interrupting by causing an accident. When they came, it was too late and Masooda and Khaja were nowhere to be found.

Mir swore vengeance on Masooda for disrupting the peace of his family, ignoring his job and family in the process causing his wife and child to abandon him. It took him 10 years to learn what Masooda intended and where she was. Taking a Chaadar and dagger to resist and end her, Mir and Nargis headed to Hyderabad but could not find Khaja in the building. They, however managed to tie Masooda to the tree after a scuffle during which her bracelet fell off her hand but she continued to harm the people, who had accompanied Mir and Nargis using her incantations. Enraged, Mir stabbed Masooda to death. Khaja dug Masooda's grave and took her corpse intending to revive her using the Black Magic he learnt from her but it backfired killing him. Before dying, he informed Mir about the location of Masooda's corpse. Mir buried it in the forest and hid the Chaadar and dagger in the bungalow, where Masooda performed Black Magic.

Presently, Gopi retrieves the Chaadar and dagger and goes to Rizwan with Nargis. The day of ritual arrives. In Chittoor, Gopi and Neelam have to put the Chaadar on Masooda's corpse by finding it at 2 AM which would weaken her powers and Alauddin would remove the bracelet freeing Nazia from Masooda's control. However, things do not go as planned as Masooda haunts Gopi and Neelam. Nazia frees herself from the shackles and goes on killing one of Rizwan's henchmen and Abdul. She tries to murder Nargis but Alauddin rescues her and they go into a veranda, locking the entry door. The Chaadar flies off due to wind and clings to a tree and Gopi climbs the tree to retrieve it. A tree falls off trapping Neelam's leg but she asks Gopi to let go of her and put the Chaadar on Masooda's corpse. Nazia enters the veranda and tries to murder Nargis after injuring Alauddin. Masooda's spirit attacks Gopi, who amasses great strength and courage to stab the spirit using the dagger and immediately puts the Chaadar on Masooda's corpse weakening its control on Nazia and Nargis removes the bracelet freeing her. The problems come to an end and Rizwan appreciates Gopi and Neelam for their courage.

Gopi narrates the whole story to Mini, who convinced of it reconciles with him but the couple is horrified by Masooda, who begins to haunt them.

== Cast ==
- Sangeetha as Neelam
- Thiruveer as Gopi Krishna
- Kavya Kalyanram as Mini
- Akhila Ram as Masooda Bi
- Bandhavi Sridhar as Nazia
- Shubhalekha Sudhakar as Rizwan Baba
- Satyam Rajesh as Alauddin Baba
- Satya Prakash as Abdul Azeem, Nazia's estranged father
- Surya Rao as Mir Taj
- Surabhi Prabhavathi as Nargis
- Krishna Teja as Sudhakar, Gopi's friend
- Santhosh Singuru
- Mirchi Hemanth as Gopi's office colleague
- Karthik Adusumalli as Salman

== Soundtrack ==
The soundtrack was composed by Prashanth R Vihari. The soundtrack was distributed by Sony Music India

Masooda

Soundtrack album by Prashanth R Vihari
- Released: 2022
- Recorded: 2022
- Genre: Feature film soundtrack
- Length: 14:09
- Label: Sony Music India
- Producer: Prashanth R Vihari

Prashanth R Vihari chronology
Bomma Blockbuster (2022)	Masooda (2022)
External audio
- Official Audio Jukebox on YouTube

No.	Title	Lyrics	Artist(s)	Length
1.	"Daachi Daachi"	Chaitanya Pingali	Sid Sriram	05:17
2.	"Chukkalni Thaake"	Sri Sai Kiran	Abhay Jodhpurkar	03:36
3.	"Daachi Daachi"	Chaitanya Pingali	Bombay Jayashri	05:17
Total length:				14:09

== Release ==
Masooda was released on 18 November 2022. The theatrical rights of the film were sold at a cost of ₹1.30 crore. The digital streaming rights were acquired by Aha and was premiered on 21 December 2022.

== Reception ==
=== Critical reception ===
The Times of India gave a rating of 3 out of 5 stating that "Masooda is a well-made horror offering". Sangeetha Devi Dundoo of The Hindu opined that the film squandered its potential with a long-drawn narrative that feels incomplete. Citing it as "a true-blue horror film", Jeevi of Idlebrain praised score, performance of lead actors and screenplay while criticizing the duration and slow-paced narration.

=== Box office ===
By the end of its theatrical run, Masooda collected a worldwide gross of ₹11.72 crore with a distributor's share of ₹6.26 crore.

=== Awards ===
SIIMA Award for Best Supporting Actress – Telugu - Sangeetha Krish
