= Bombhaat =

2020 Telugu film by Raghavendra Varma

- Official release poster
- Directed by: Raghavendra Varma
- Screenplay by: Akshay Poolla
- Story by: Taneesh Raj; Raghavendra Varma
- Produced by: Vishwas Hannurkar
- Starring: Sai Sushanth; Chandini Chowdary; Simran Choudhary
- Cinematography: Mentem Satheesh
- Edited by: Gautam Raju
- Music by: Josh B
- Production company: Sucheta Dreamworks Productions
- Distributed by: Amazon Prime Video
- Release date: 3 December 2020
- Running time: 136 min
- Country: India
- Language: Telugu

Bombhaat (transl. Awesome) is a 2020 Indian Telugu-language science fiction film directed by Raghavendra Varma and produced by Vishwas Hannurkar under the Sucheta DreamWorks Productions banner. The film is presented by K. Raghavendra Rao and the music is scored by Josh B. The film stars Sai Sushanth Reddy, Chandini Chowdary, and Simran Choudhary.

== Plot ==
With luck never on his side, a young robotics engineer constantly battles his comedic misfortune. But things take a serious turn once he becomes entangled in an epic revenge story between his God Father and the Mad Scientist, who is chasing a dangerously powerful formula. A tale of twisted love, with sparks of Sci-Fi, and a deadly plot of vengeance. Will the power of science finally triumph over fate?

== Cast ==
- Sai Sushanth as Vicky
- Simran Choudary as Maya
- Chandini Chowdary as Chaitra
- Priyadarshi Pulikonda as Karun
- Shishir Sharma as Professor Aacharya, Maya's father
- Makarand Deshpande as Mad Scientist
- Vineet Kumar as Dada
- Tanikella Bharani as Varaha Murthy, Vicky's father
- Hema as Kumari, Vicky's mother
- Fish Venkat as Dada's henchman
- Pramodini as Maya's mother
- Dhanvi as young Maya
- Silly Monks Sanjay as Chaitra's father
- Rama Devi as Chaitra's grandmother

== Soundtrack ==
The soundtrack and background score was scored by Josh B, and the audio was released on Lahari Music.

Tracklist
No.	Title	Lyrics	Artist(s)	Length
1.	"Ishq Kiya"	Ramanjaneyulu	Sunitha Sarathy	4:19
2.	"Swami Natha"	Ramajogayya Sastry	Chandana Bala Kalyan, Karthik, Harini Ivaturi	5:16
3.	"Chuppanathi"	Ramajogayya Sastry	Sharanya Srinivas	3:29
4.	"Kaalam Pravaham"	Gangothri Viswanadha Sastry	M. M. Keeravani	2:35
5.	"Nuvvante Ishtamante"	Ramanjaneyulu	Abhay Jodhpurkar, Padmalatha Ramanand	3:38
6.	"Kaalam Pravaham (Reprise version)"	Gangothri Viswanadha Sastry	Master Rahul Vellal	2:35
7.	"Swami Natha (Reprise version)"	Ramajogayya Sastry	Yazin Nizar, Chandana Bala Kalyan, Harini Ivaturi	5:16

== Reception ==
The film received negative reviews from critics.The News Minute, rated the film 2/5 and stated that "Bombhaat suffers from clichéd, occasionally cringeworthy writing, that also trickles into the performances." Manoj Kumar of The Indian Express rated the film 1 star out of 5, and wrote "A sci-fi film that neither serves drama nor logic." Kumar opined that the director uses Hitchcock's quote "Where drama begins logic ends" as an excuse "to make an utterly nonsensical movie that neither serves drama nor logic."

The Hindu's Sangeetha Devi wrote about the film that "This isn’t science, just dull and drab fiction."
