= Mental Madhilo =

- Theatrical release poster
- Directed by: Vivek Athreya
- Written by: Vivek Athreya
- Produced by: Raj Kandukuri
- Starring: Sree Vishnu; Nivetha Pethuraj; Amrutha Srinivasan
- Cinematography: Vedaraman Sankaran
- Edited by: Viplav Nyshadam
- Music by: Prashanth R Vihari
- Production company: Dharmapatha Creations
- Distributed by: Suresh Productions; Freeze Frame Films (Overseas Distribution)
- Release date: 24 November 2017
- Running time: 134 minutes
- Country: India
- Language: Telugu

Mental Madhilo (transl. Crazy at Heart) is a 2017 Indian Telugu-language romantic comedy film written and directed by Vivek Athreya in his directorial debut, and produced by Raj Kandukuri (known for Pelli Choopulu) for Dharmapatha Creations. The film features Sree Vishnu, Nivetha Pethuraj, and Amrutha Srinivasan in lead roles with Sivaji Raja, Madhumani, Raj Madiraju, and Anita Chowdary in supporting roles. This film marks the Telugu debuts of Nivetha and Srinivasan. The songs and background score for the movie were composed and arranged by Prashanth R Vihari. The film was released on 24 November 2017. The film's title was taken from a song from the 2015 film OK Bangaram.

== Plot ==
In Hyderabad, Aravind Krishna is a chronically indecisive young man who has struggled with simple choices since childhood. An embarrassing incident at age twelve leaves him awkward around women, causing him to bungle numerous alliance attempts until he meets Swetcha, a straightforward and clear-headed woman. Recognizing Aravind's gentle and sincere nature, Swetcha accepts his proposal. As they spend time together before their engagement, Aravind slowly overcomes his lifelong discomfort around women and falls for her.

Aravind travels to Mumbai for a professional project and meets Renuka "Renu", a free-spirited architecture student. After losing contact initially, they meet again by chance and end up co-living as roommates. Intrigued by her spontaneous belief in destiny, Aravind becomes infatuated with Renu. However, after sharing a kiss and revealing her past tragedy, Renu abruptly leaves the apartment, throwing Aravind into severe confusion.

In panic, Aravind tries calling off his engagement to Swetcha, only to play it off as a joke when he regrets his decision. When Swetcha unexpectedly visits Mumbai, she figures out the truth about Renu and confronts Aravind before returning home to Hyderabad.

Back in Hyderabad, Aravind's father shares his own youth dilemmas to help him understand that choices always carry risks, prompting Aravind to finally confront his indecisiveness. He apologizes to Renu, who encourages him to pursue the woman he truly loves. Aravind and his father rush to catch Swetcha before she leaves town on a bus. Confronting her onboard, Aravind assures Swetcha that he has overcome his hesitation and genuinely chooses her. Touched by his resolve, Swetcha accepts his proposal, and the two are eventually married.

== Cast ==
- Sree Vishnu as Aravind Krishna
- Nivetha Pethuraj as Swetcha
- Amrutha Srinivasan as Renuka
- Keshav Deepak as Manu
- Kireeti Damaraju as Saki
- Shivaji Raja as Aravind's father
- Madhumani as Aravind's mother
- Raj Madiraju as Swetcha's father
- Anita Chowdary as Swetcha's mother
- Dinesh Koushika as Aravind's friend
- Appaji Ambarisha Darbha as office colleague
- Jahanvi Dassety
- Sujata
- Nara Rohit as a bus passenger (Cameo Appearance)

== Production ==
Vivek Athreya made his directorial debut with this film, in addition to writing the screenplay. The film was shot in Hyderabad, Mumbai, and Goa. Production was completed within the planned schedule of 40 days. The film was distributed in India by Suresh Productions. The film was released in India on 24 November 2017; preview screenings were held for critics and select audiences a few days before the release. Overseas, it was distributed by Freeze Frame Films LLC.

== Soundtrack ==
Mental Madhilo

Film score by Prashanth R Vihari
- Released: 2017
- Recorded: 2017
- Venue: Chennai
- Studio: AM Studios
- Genre: Feature film soundtrack
- Length: 32:47
- Label: Madhura Audio
- Producer: Prashanth R Vihari

Prashanth R Vihari chronology
Vellipomakey (2017)	Mental Madhilo (2017)	Adhugo (2018)
External audio
- Audio Jukebox on YouTube

The music was composed by Prashanth R Vihari. Producer Raj Kandukuri and actor Nani released the soundtrack's first song, "Gummadikaya Halwa" at SIIMA 2017.

Track list
No.	Title	Lyrics	Singer(s)	Length
1.	"Gummadikaya Halwa"	Vivek Athreya	Vedala Hemachandra, Prashanth R Vihari	4:36
2.	"Oohale"	Vivek Athreya	Shakthisree Gopalan	4:38
3.	"Manavi Alakinacharadate"	Hasith Goli, Vivek Athreya	Pradeep Kumar	5:42
4.	"Edhola"	Kittu Vissapragada	LV Revanth, Ranjani Sivakumar	4:17
5.	"Bagundayya Chandram"	Hasith Goli	Diwakar, Pranav Chaganty	3:38
6.	"Chelliyo Chellako"	Bhaskarabhatla, Palak Khatri	Yazin Nizar	4:36
7.	"Malik Tere"	Sirasri	Nikhita Gandhi	5:01
Total length:				32:47

== Reception ==
The film has garnered positive feedback from the audience and critics. Both Vishnu and Pethuraj received accolades for their performances. On its opening weekend, the film drew a gross profit of ₹2.25 across domestic and international box offices.

== Awards ==
Award	Category	Recipient	Result	Ref
7th SIIMA Awards	Best Debut Director	Vivek Athreya	Nominated	
7th SIIMA Awards	Best Debut Actress	Nivetha Pethuraj	Nominated	
Zee Apsara Awards 2018	Best Fresh Face of The Year	Nivetha Pethuraj	Won	
