= Beep (film) =

2026 Indian Tamil-language film

- Theatrical release poster
- Directed by: L. Shanmuga Sundar
- Written by: L. Shanmuga Sundar
- Starring: Raaghav; Prerna Khanna; Yamini Lakshmanan
- Cinematography: Pradeep Padmakumar
- Edited by: Abhishek; Vignesh
- Music by: Prashanth R Vihari
- Production company: mQuest Movies
- Release date: 18 September 2026
- Running time: 135 minutes
- Country: India
- Language: Tamil

Beep is a 2026 Indian Tamil-language fantasy crime thriller film directed and written by L. Shanmuga Sundar and produced by mQuest Movies. The film stars Raaghav in the lead role, alongside Prerna Khanna and Yamini Lakshmanan. The music was composed by Prashanth R Vihari. The film was released on 18 September 2026.

== Plot ==
The film is about two parallel storylines that eventually intertwine. The first storyline follows a college story: achieving goal of meeting top-heroine and the second one, cop story, follows the themes: drug case and murder mystery. The film's central concept revolves around the protagonist, Ilandevan's Photo Sensory Ability. He has this strange gift: the power to step inside any photograph — seeing and hearing what the people in it were really thinking, not just talking. He explains it as hyper pattern analysis and psycho analysis. His friend perceives it as 'aandavan seyal' – God's gift – clairvoyance. Ilandevan playfully uses the skill to play hitch and analyse whether someone's muse actually loves them. Rest of the story is about when faced with a life changing event, is the hero's special skill useful. Why can't he use it now? How he finds a way out of it forms the crux of the plot.

== Cast ==
- Raaghav as Raghav
- Prerna Khanna
- Yamini Lakshmanan as Sunaina
- Priyadharshini
- Nitish Veera as a police officer
- Arun Mohan
- Shravan
- Rajesh Balaji
- Sai Prabu

The film also features a voiceover from K. Bhagyaraj.

== Production ==
Beep marks the feature film directorial debut of L. Shanmuga Sundar, who previously directed the short film Kattu. The film is produced by mQuest Movies. Prashanth R Vihari composed the music, while Pradeep Padmakumar handled the cinematography. Abhishek and Vignesh served as editors. K. Bhagyaraj initially declined to provide the narration but agreed after reading the film's script. He subsequently met L. Shanmuga Sundar and presented him with a pen.

== Release and reception ==
The film was released on 18 September 2026. Dinakaran appreciated Raaghav's performance, the cinematography, lack of violence and criticised the screenplay. Virakesari too appreciated the cinematography as well as the background score and criticised the writing, feeling there was more confusion than enjoyment.
