= Bomma Blockbuster =

Indian romantic action drama film

- Release poster
- Directed by: Raj Virat
- Written by: Raj Virat
- Produced by: Praveen Pagadala; Bose Babu Nidimolu; Anand Reddy Maddi; Manohar Reddy Eeda
- Starring: Nandu; Rashmi Gautam
- Cinematography: Sujatha Siddharth
- Edited by: B. Subhaskar; Prateek Nuti
- Music by: Prashanth R Vihari
- Release date: 4 November 2022
- Running time: 123 minutes
- Country: India
- Language: Telugu

Bomma Blockbuster (lit. 'Blockbuster picture') is a 2022 Indian Telugu-language romantic action drama film written and directed by Raj Virat and produced by Praveen Pagadala, Bose Babu Nidimolu, Anand Reddy Maddi and Manohar Reddy Eeda for Vijayibhava Arts. The film features Nandu and Rashmi Gautam in lead roles with Kireeti Damaraju and Raghu Kunche in pivotal roles. Songs and background score are composed by Prashanth R Vihari.

== Plot ==
Pothuraja was a fisherman and a villager. He is very fond of director Puri Jagannadh. Pothuraju wrote a story based on his life events and his desire is to make the film with Puri Jagannadh. One day Pothuraj's father is killed by unknown persons. Later, the movie tells how Poturaju fulfills his dream and takes revenge on those who killed his father.

== Cast ==
- Nandu as Pothuraju
- Rashmi Gautam
- Kireeti Damaraju
- Raghu Kunche
- Manideep Chandra as Junior Pothuraju

== Soundtrack ==
Bomma Blockbuster

Film score by Prashanth R Vihari
- Released: 2022
- Recorded: 2022
- Genre: Feature film soundtrack
- Length: 20:18
- Language: Telugu
- Label: Lahari Music
- Producer: Prashanth R Vihari

Prashanth R Vihari chronology
Panchathantram (2022)	Bomma Blockbuster (2022)	Masooda (2022)
External audio
- EP on Spotify

Music composed by Prashanth R Vihari.

Track list
No.	Title	Lyrics	Singer(s)	Length
1.	"Raaye Nuv Raaye"	Kittu Vissapragada	Manisha Eerabathini, Muheet Bharti, Ram Miriyala	4:44
2.	"Nadikudi Railanti Sodaraa"	Vivek Athreya	Vaikom Vijayalakshmi	4:19
3.	"Love All The Heters"	Pranav Chaganty	Mangli, Pranav Chaganty	3:31
4.	"Raaye Acoustic Version"	Manisha Eerabathini	Manisha Eerabathini	3:04
5.	"Nanna"	Bhaskarabhatla	Anurag Kulkarni	4:40
Total length:				20:18

== Release ==
The film was released on 4 November 2022.

== Critical reception ==
The film received 2 stars out of five in a review by The Times of India and 2.5 out of five in a review by Sakshi.
