= Raja Vikramarka (2021 film) =

- Theatrical release poster
- Directed by: Sri Saripalli
- Written by: Sri Saripalli
- Produced by: 88 Rama Reddy
- Starring: Kartikeya; Tanya Ravichandran; P. Sai Kumar
- Cinematography: P. C. Mouli
- Edited by: Jesvin Prabu
- Music by: Prashanth R Vihari
- Production company: Sree Chitra Movie Makers
- Release date: 12 November 2021
- Running time: 140 minutes
- Country: India
- Language: Telugu

Raja Vikramarka is a 2021 Indian Telugu-language action comedy thriller film written and directed by Sri Saripalli in his directorial debut and produced by Rama Reddy. The film stars Kartikeya, Tanya Ravichandran and P. Sai Kumar in the lead roles, while Sudhakar Komakula, Pasupathy, Tanikella Bharani, and Harsha Vardhan play supporting roles. The music was composed by Prashanth R Vihari with cinematography by P. C. Mouli and editing by Jesvin Prabu. The film was released on 12 November 2021.

== Plot ==
An NIA agent, Raja Vikramarka 'Vikram', a cool, reckless, but smart IPS officer, works under Mahendra, who is also his mentor and father figure. One day, they catch a Nigerian agent who once supplied arms to the gang of Guru Narayan, a former Naxalite. He informs them that Guru Narayan is alive and came back with vengeance against Chakravarthy, a former sincere IPS officer turned Home Minister of the state, so he supplied the arms again to kill Chakravarthy. In the interrogation, Vikram accidentally kills him before he reveals their entire plan. However, Mahendra manages to send Vikram on a secret mission as an insurance policy agent under Muddu Krishna, a classical dancer-turned insurance agent who teaches classical dance to Kanthi, Chakravarthy's daughter, by hiding his identity to investigate the matter. Vikram falls in love with Kanthi. Although she initially turns down his advances, she likes him and eventually expresses her feelings.

Meanwhile, ACP Govind Narayan, a sincere and hot-headed IPS officer who takes care of Chakravarthy's security, finds Vikram's and Kanthi's relationship and suddenly visits Vikram's home. There, he finds out Vikram's secret operation. Left with no option, Vikram reveals his identity to Govind. Mahendra intervenes and convinces Govind to cooperate with them; then Vikram and Govind decide to work together to catch Guru Narayan. As expected, Guru Narayan attacks Chakravarthy at Muddu Krishna's meeting, who became a manager by taking Chakravarthy's life insurance policy, which is worth 10 crore. Vikram stops and arrests him. While everyone else feels relaxed, Vikram still doubts Guru Narayan's intentions behind his arrest. As Vikram anticipated, Guru Narayan's men kidnap Kanthi at her dance performance in front of Chakravarthy and demand that he be released.

A flashback episode reveals that Chakravarthy has an enmity with Guru Narayan. When Chakravarthy was an IPS officer, he attacked and annihilated the gang of Guru Narayan, who used to carry out contract killings under the disguise of Maoism. Chakravarthy shoots Guru Narayan, who escapes but is hospitalized in a comatose condition. After waking up from a 15-year coma, Guru Narayan wished to destroy Chakravarthy's goodwill in public and executed the current plan. Guru Narayan, who is now in jail, negotiates Kanthi's release in exchange for his own release. Vikram realizes that Guru Narayan wants to kill Kanthi in front of Chakravarthy and escapes, which makes him morally wounded and challenges the entire department.

Chakravarthy accompanies him along with Govind, who wants to free his daughter without letting him escape. In an unfortunate turn of events, Chakravarthy accidentally gets killed at the hands of Govind. An enraged Vikram chases and kills Guru Narayan, who is trying to escape. Kanthi remains with the kidnappers. On his deathbed, Chakravarthy reveals that Kanthi told him about Vikram, and he accepted their relationship. Vikram promises to save Kanthi, then Chakravarthy advises him not to leave anyone involved in the conspiracy.

It is revealed that Govind is Guru Narayan's son and the mastermind behind the kidnapping. It is revealed that he killed Chakravarthy on purpose but passed it off as an accident. Oblivious to this, Vikram is on his way to nab the criminals. Meanwhile, the enraged Govind attempts to kill Kanthi for killing his father and calls Vikram under a disguise to kill Kanthi on hearing of him. While talking with Govind, Vikram finds a minor clue: a news channel regular tune. Then he goes to the office and announces Rs 10 Crores (the insurance amount of Chakravarthy) in exchange for Kanthi to lure the kidnappers. While Govind does not bother about the money and wants to kill her, his gang convinces him to get the money. After a cat-and-mouse game in a final confrontation, Vikram recognizes Govind as the mastermind, saves Kanthi, arrests the kidnappers, and kills Govind.

== Cast ==
- Kartikeya as Raja Vikramarka IPS 'Vikram'
- Tanya Ravichandran as Kanthi
- Sudhakar Komakula as ACP Govind Narayan IPS
  - Master Harsh Roshan as Young Govind Narayan
- P. Sai Kumar as Home Minister Chakravarthy
- Pasupathy as Guru Narayan
- Tanikella Bharani as Mahendra IPS
- Harsha Vardhan as Muddu Krishna
- Naga Mahesh as Bhadram
- Dayanand Reddy as Veerabhadram
- Surya
- Gemini Suresh
- Jabardhasth Naveen

== Production ==
The film is directed by debutant Sri Saripalli, who earlier worked as an assistant director of Naayak (2013), Alludu Seenu (2014), and Nuvvu Thopu Raa (2019). The film was announced in October 2019, and the principal photography was started in late 2019. The filming was resumed in February 2020 after being delayed due to the COVID-19 pandemic in India and wrapped the entire shoot in August 2021. The title of the film was adapted from the 1990 film Raja Vikramarka, directed by Ravi Raja Pinisetty.

== Soundtrack ==
Raja Vikramarka

Soundtrack album by Prashanth R Vihari
- Released: 2021
- Recorded: 2021
- Genre: Film soundtrack
- Length: 16:19
- Label: Saregama
- Producer: Prashanth R Vihari

Prashanth R Vihari chronology
| Dorasaani (2021) | Raja Vikramarka (2021) | Sehari (2021) |
External audio
- Audio Jukebox on YouTube

The soundtrack was composed by Prashanth R Vihari and was released by Saregama.

All music is composed by Prashanth R Vihari.

| No. | Title | Lyrics | Singer(s) | Length |
|---|---|---|---|---|
| 1. | "Raja Garu Bayatakosthe" (Backing vocals: Santhosh Hariharan, Deepak, Shenbagaraj) | Krishnakanth | David Simon | 4:09 |
| 2. | "Sammathame" | Ramajogayya Sastry | Karthik, Shashaa Tirupati, Chaitra Ambadipudi | 4:12 |
| 3. | "Rama Kanavemira" (Backing vocals: RItesh, Naresh, Kavya, Aparna) | Ramajogayya Sastry | Anurag Kulkarni, Manisha Eerabathini | 4:32 |
| 4. | "Kaalam Kadalai" | Sa Na Re | Yazin Nizar, Ritesh G Rao | 3:25 |
| Total length: | | | | 16:19 |

== Reception ==
=== Critical reception ===
Thadhagath Pathi of The Times of India gave a rating of 2/5 and cited the film as "dull and disappointing fare". He felt that "Raja Vikramarka was seen in the past, in the form of many films and the beats feel familiar. This one fails to engage." In contrast, Y Sunita Chowdhary of The Hindu felt that the film has a refreshing narrative. She further wrote that "the film is a good watch" and praised the writing department. Writing for The Indian Express, Gabbeta Ranjith Kumar criticized the story and screenplay. He also opined that "a talent like Pasupathy, who entertained all with his acting prowess in Sarpatta Parambarai, is wasted here".

=== Box office ===
On its opening day, the film has collected a gross collection of ₹1.25 crore.
