= Vellipomakey =

- Theatrical release poster
- Directed by: Yakub Ali
- Written by: Yakub Ali
- Produced by: Dil Raju
- Starring: Vishwak Sen; Nithyasree Reddy; Supriya
- Cinematography: Vidya Sagar Chinta; Akhilesh Kothakota
- Edited by: Ali Mohammed
- Music by: Prashanth R Vihari
- Production companies: Sri Venkateswara Creations; Sai Akhilesh Productions
- Release date: 2 September 2017
- Running time: 108 minutes
- Country: India
- Language: Telugu

Vellipomakey (transl. Don't go away) is a 2017 Indian Telugu-language romantic drama film written and directed by Yakub Ali. (Note: Credited as Ali Mohammad.) The film stars debutant Vishwak Sen and Nithyasree Reddy.

== Plot ==
Chandu is an animator from Warangal. Most of his friends have relationships and he doesn't have one. Shruthi, is his colleague from work and they work in a project together. Before Chandu asks Shruthi out, she rejects him. He later receives a friend request from Swetha. Swetha makes a large impact on Chandu's life: he is isolated from his friends and work. Things go haywire for Chandu as Swetha goes missing out and he gets worried. Upon searching he reaches a School building where Chandu finds out a guy who is Swetha's cousin and explains him that Swetha is fed up with her parents behaviour, out of frustration she left her house and stays at her grandmother's home. And then Swetha falls in love with a guy who later cheats her on being in relation with another girl and Swetha takes a lot of time in the process of healing up. In order to be happy, she selects unknown persons in the form of love where her cousin won't object her because she's happy for a particular time upon spending some memorable moments with them. Chandu asks her cousin to call Swetha once to meet but she won't show up. Chandu leaves the place in a depressed state and settles his friend's love matter with a neat clarification to his parents. Later Chandu joins another company where he meets Shruthi, his previous company's colleague who works with him again. It is implied that they are interested in each other and that, Chandu has begun to move on.

== Cast ==
- Vishwak Sen as Chandrasekhar "Chandu"
- Nithyasree Reddy as Swetha
- Supriya as Shruthi
- Prashant Podagatlapalli as Kishore
- Swetha as Anusha
- Vidya as Deepthi
- Pavan as Raju

== Production ==
The film began production as a one-hour independent film. The film was produced on a low budget. Dil Raju announced his interest in producing the film after watching the film's trailer.

== Soundtrack ==
Vellipomakey

Film score by Prashanth R Vihari
- Released: 2017
- Recorded: 2017
- Genre: Feature film soundtrack
- Producer: Prashanth R. Vihari

Prashanth R Vihari chronology
Vellipomakey (2017)	Mental Madhilo (2017)

The film was scored by debutante Prashanth R Vihari and the lyrics were written by Sri Sai Kiran.

- "Edho Cherukundi" - Muheet Bharti
- "Ela Ela" - Kamalaja Rajagopal, Karthik Rodriguez
- "Ila Na Jathaga" - Prashanth R. Vihari
- "Yemo Ye Vaipo" - Abhay Jodhpurkar
- "Silent Wail Alaap" - Abhijith Rao

== Release and reception ==
Vellipomakey was originally scheduled to release on 10 March 2017 before the release was pushed to 2 September.

The Hindu wrote that "A confident storyteller here translates his script to celluloid with precision, the film is a calming experience and the impact is more than the sum of its elements- the stirring background score and slick cinematography lend depth to the frames". The Times of India gave the film a rating of three out of five stars and wrote that "The strength of Vellipomakey lies in the fact that Yakub is able to narrate an ordinary tale effectively without any frills, bells or whistles".
