= Sehari =

2022 film

- Theatrical release poster
- Directed by: Gnanasagar Dwaraka
- Written by: Harsh Kanumilli
- Produced by: Advaya Jishnu Reddy
- Starring: Harsh Kanumilli; Simran Choudhary; Abhinav Gomatam
- Cinematography: Suresh Sarangam
- Edited by: Ravi Teja Girijala
- Music by: Prashanth R Vihari
- Production company: Virgo Pictures
- Release date: 11 February 2022
- Country: India
- Language: Telugu

Sehari (transl. Celebration) is a 2022 Indian Telugu-language romantic comedy film directed by debutant Gnanasagar Dwaraka. The film stars debutant Harsh Kanumilli and Simran Choudhary. The title is inspired from the song of the same name from the film Oy! (2009).

The music is composed by Prashanth R Vihari while cinematography and editing is done by Suresh Sarangam and Ravi Teja Girijala respectively. Produced by Virgo Pictures, the film was theatrically released on 11 February 2022. The film received negative critical reviews on release.

== Plot ==
Shattered by his break-up with his toxic girlfriend Subbalachmi, a disturbed young man Varun takes a hasty decision to get married, despite objection from his friends Vasu and Vinni. During the arrangements for his wedding with his fiancé Aliya, things take a different turn as Varun ends up falling for Aliya's elder sister Amulya, a fashion designer who is four years elder than him.

== Cast ==
- Harsh Kanumilli as Varun
- Simran Choudhary as Amulya
- Abhinav Gomatam as Vasu
- Snehaja Velidindi as Aliya
- Akshitha Shetty as Subbalachmi
- Praneeth Reddy Kallem as Vinni
- Anisha Alla as Pooja Akka
- Saluri Koteswara Rao as Vikram, Varun's father
- Rajeshwari Mullapudi as Varun's mother
- N Balakrishna as Amulya and Aliya's father
- Nandu as a passerby (Cameo)

== Soundtrack ==
Sehari

Soundtrack album by Prashanth R Vihari
- Released: 2022
- Recorded: 2021
- Genre: Film soundtrack
- Length: 29:59
- Label: Aditya Music
- Producer: Prashanth R Vihari

Prashanth R Vihari chronology
Raja Vikramarka (2021)	Sehari (2022)	Skylab (2021)
External audio
- Audio Jukebox on YouTube

The soundtrack and score of the film is composed by Prashanth R Vihari.

No.	Title	Lyrics	Singer(s)	Length
1.	"Sehari"	Bhaskarabhatla	Ram Miriyala	3:39
2.	"Idhi Chala Baagundhi Le"	Kittu Vissapragada	Sid Sriram	3:54
3.	"Manase Swayanga"	Kittu Vissapragada	Yashika Sikka	3:34
4.	"Rama Rama"	Sanapati Bharadwaj Patrudu	Jassie Gift	3:23
5.	"Naa Disha Neeve"	Sanapati Bharadwaj Patrudu	Yazin Nizar	3:09
6.	"Life of Varun"	Pranav Chaganty	Mangli, Pranav Chaganty	3:24
7.	"Subbalachmi"	Kittu Vissapragada	Anurag Kulkarni	3:51
8.	"Wrongu Ringa"	Prashanth R Vihari	Prashanth R Vihari	2:06
9.	"Rap Battle"	Pranav Chaganty	Pranav Chaganty, Abhinav Gomatam	2:59
Total length:				29:59

== Release ==
The film was theatrically released on 11 February 2022 coinciding with the release of Khiladi.

== Reception ==
The film received negative reviews from critics. 123 Telugu gave the film a rating of 2.75/5 and wrote "'Sehari' is a passable rom-com that has a good first half and climax. The situational comedy works out well but the film is filled with lag in multiple scenes". Thadhagath Pathi of The Times of India gave the film 2.5/5 and wrote "'Sehari' is not a terrible rom-com, it's just not innovative or fresh either. If you're not bored of the same stories the film industry keeps churning out, this one's for you".

Pinkvilla gave the film a rating of 2 out of 5 and wrote "Abhinav Gomatam, as Varun's friend, is deployed to do the needful. In a film whose writing is consistently silly, Prashanth R Vihari's music is the film's only meritorious aspect. 'Idhi Chala Bagundhile' is enjoyable. The cinematography is another asset". Prakash Pecheti of Telangana Today stated "Although 'Sehari' looks to be a tested trope in the very first glimpse, it has the screenplay that doesn't deviate your attention as an audience. Away from the regular cliched film conversation in a commercial cinema, director Gnanasagar tries to present the comedy in a more organic and subtle manner".
