= Simran Choudhary =

Indian actress

- Choudhary in 2022
- Born: Hyderabad, Andhra Pradesh (present-day Telangana), India
- Education: St Francis College for Women
- Occupations: Actress, model, classical dancer
- Years active: 2010–present
- Known for: Ee Nagaraniki Emaindi
- Title: Miss India Telangana 2017

Simran Choudhary is an Indian actress and model who works in Telugu films. She won the title of Femina Miss India Telangana 2017. Simran made her lead film debut in 2014 with the Telugu film Hum Tum.

== Early life ==
Choudhary was born and brought up in Hyderabad. She has done her schooling from DRS international School and completed her graduation from St. Francis College for Women, Hyderabad.

== Career ==
Choudhary started her career as a model and participated in many contests, and she won the titles of Tollywood Miss Hyderabad, in 2017 Femina Miss India Telangana, Miss Talented. She made her lead debut in the year 2014 in the Telugu film Hum Tum.

== Filmography ==
Key
†	Denotes films that have not yet been released

Year	Title	Role	Note
2010	Varudu	Sandy's friend	
2014	Hum Tum	Pallavi	
2018	Ee Nagaraniki Emaindhi	Shilpa	
2020	Bombhaat	Maya	
2021	Check	Varna	
2021	Paagal	Sofie	
2022	Sehari	Amulya	
2023	Atharva	Nithya	
2024	Aa Okkati Adakku	A bride	Cameo appearance in the song "Rajadhi Raja"
2024	Love Me	Pinky	
2026	Vanaveera	Indhu	
