= Vanaveera =

2026 Indian Telugu film by Avinash Thiruveedhula

- Theatrical release poster
- Directed by: Avinash Thiruveedhula
- Screenplay by: Vishwajit
- Story by: Vishwajit
- Produced by: Shanthanu Pathi; Avinash Buyani; Alapati Raja; Ankith Reddy
- Starring: Avinash Thiruveedhula; Simran Choudhary; Nandu
- Cinematography: Sujatha Siddharth
- Edited by: Chota K. Prasad
- Music by: Vivek Sagar
- Production company: Silver Screen Cinemas LLP
- Distributed by: Asian Cinemas
- Release date: 1 January 2026
- Running time: 126 minutes
- Country: India
- Language: Telugu

Vanaveera is a 2026 Indian Telugu-language action drama film directed by Avinash Thiruveedhula who also plays the lead alongside Simran Choudhary and Nandu.

The film was theatrically released on 1 January 2026.

== Plot ==
Raghu is a good-for-nothing guy. Indhu is his cousin, and the two deeply love each other. Raghu's father keeps telling him to pursue a job, but Raghu never takes him seriously. Deva, a member of the dominant caste in Raghu's town, is chosen as the MLA candidate by the Nava Nirmana Party. Problems arise when Deva's followers use Raghu's bike for a rally but fail to return it.

== Cast ==
- Avinash Thiruveedhula as Raghu
- Simran Choudhary as Indhu
- Nandu as Deva
- Satya as Special Officer
- Kona Venkat as Manohar
- Sivaji Raja as Raghu's father
- Aamani as Indhu's mother
- Devi Prasad as Indhu's father
- Tarzan Laxminarayana as Basava (Deva's assistant)
- Chammak Chandra as P. K. (political strategist)
- Prudhvi Raj as Doraswami (opposition party candidate)
- Bhadram as Baachi (Doraswami's assistant)
- Mahaboob Basha as Maasa (Raghu's friend)
- Jyothi Reddy as Deva's mother
- Balagam Sanjay Krishna as Deva's brother-in-law
- Appaji Ambarisha Darbha as Party President

== Music ==
The background score and songs were composed by Vivek Sagar.

Track listing
No.	Title	Lyrics	Singer(s)	Length
1.	"Godharey"	Kittu Visapragada	Sweekar Agasthi	3:51
2.	"Labore"	Bharadwaj Gali	Vivek Sagar	3:41
3.	"Adaraho"	Vivek Sagar, Bharadwaj Gali	Vivek Sagar	3:01

== Release and reception ==
The film was initially titled Vanara. It was later changed to Vanaveera due to censor issues and was released on 1 January 2026.

Aithagoni Raju of Asianet News Telugu rated it 2.75 out of and appreciated Avinash Thiruveedhula's work. Bhargav Chaganti of NTV rated the film 2.5 out of 5. TV9 Telugu gave a mixed review noting Nandu's performance.
