= Rowdy Boys =

2022 film by Sree Harsha Konuganti

- Theatrical release poster
- Directed by: Sree Harsha Konuganti
- Written by: Sree Harsha Konuganti, Chiranjiv Makwana
- Screenplay by: Chiranjiv Makwana
- Story by: Chiranjiv Makwana
- Produced by: Dil Raju; Shirish
- Starring: Ashish Reddy; Anupama Parameswaran
- Cinematography: R. Madhi
- Edited by: Madhu
- Music by: Devi Sri Prasad
- Production company: Sri Venkateswara Creations
- Release date: 14 January 2022
- Running time: 145 minutes
- Country: India
- Language: Telugu

Rowdy Boys is a 2022 Indian Telugu-language coming of age romantic college drama film written and directed by Sree Harsha Konuganti Screen play by Chiranjiv Makwana and produced by Dil Raju and Shirish through Sri Venkateswara Creations. The film features debutant Ashish Reddy, son of Dil Raju's brother, Sirish Reddy, and Anupama Parameswaran in lead roles with music composed by Devi Sri Prasad. The film was released theatrically on 14 January 2022. The film received mixed reviews from critics.

== Plot ==
Akshay is a first year engineering student who falls for a medical student Kavya. However the rivalry between the medical college and engineering college is a threat to their love. Will their love survive? No in the end they broke up, a medical student named Vikram who was in love with Kavya married her.

== Cast ==
- Ashish Reddy as Akshay Varma
- Anupama Parameswaran as Kavya
- Karthik Rathnam
- Vikram Sahadev
- Tej Kurapati as Naresh Yadav
- Komalee Prasad as Shruthi, Kavya's friend
- Srikanth Iyengar as Akshay's father
- Racha Ravi
- Rupa Lakshmi as Akshay’s mother
- Praneeth Reddy Kallem
- Pridhvi
- Shrinath Kulkarni as Baby, Akshay's friend

== Production ==
Anupama was cast in March 2020 to play the lead actress. Rahul Ramakrishna was approached to do a role in the film, but couldn't join the film as he was busy working with RRR. Later, Racha Ravi was cast to do the role. In an interview with Deccan Chronicle, Komalee Prasad told about role in the film that "I am a qualified dental surgeon, so shooting for scenes involving doctors and the medical fraternity was a great experience. In fact, I got nostalgic while shooting for campus scenes".

Filming began in January 2020 and was wrapped up on 13 October 2021 after shooting the song "Date Night", choreographed by Jani Master. Speaking about the idea of the film, director Konuganti revealed that the film is inspired by an incident in his own college days. He further told: "My personal experiences in my academic life inspired me to write Rowdy Boys. The story is a perfect blend of comedy, friendship, gang fights, misunderstandings, ego clashes and, of course, love. The film brings back fond memories of college life and for those still at college, it tells you that these are the most cherished days in your life. I think all of us have these memories because it's a phase of mixed emotions".

== Soundtrack ==
Rowdy Boys

Soundtrack album by Devi Sri Prasad
- Released: 13 January 2022
- Recorded: 2021–2022
- Genre: Feature film soundtrack
- Length: 29:08
- Labels: Aditya Music; Lahari Music (One track)
- Producer: Devi Sri Prasad

Devi Sri Prasad chronology
Pushpa: The Rise (2021)	Rowdy Boys (2022)	Good Luck Sakhi (2022)

The film's soundtrack album is composed by Devi Sri Prasad.

No.	Title	Lyrics	Singer(s)	Length
1.	"Rowdy Boys Title Song"	Roll Rida	Roll Rida	2:52
2.	"Preme Aakasamaithe"	Sri Mani	Jaspreet Jasz	3:34
3.	"Brindavanam"	Suddala Ashok Teja	Mangli	3:52
4.	"Date Night"	Roll Rida	Ranjith Govind, Sameera Bharadwaj	4:01
5.	"Ye Zindagi"	Krishna Kanth	Ram Miriyala	3:54
6.	"Nuvve Na Dhairyam"	Sri Mani; Ananta Sriram	Karthik	3:17
7.	"Vesane O Nicchena"	Sri Mani	Kapil Kapilan, Sameera Bharadwaj	1:52
8.	"Okariki Okarani"	Krishna Kanth	Devi Sri Prasad	3:29
9.	"Okariki Okarani (Rock Version)"	Krishna Kanth	Yazin Nizar	2:11
10.	"Rajyangam Chattamantu Remix"	Gaddar	Deepu	1:10
Total length:				30:18

== Release ==
During the release event of "Preme Aakasamaithe" song in October 2021, producer Dil Raju announced that the film will release on 19 November 2021, but was postponed. Finally, the film was released on 14 January 2022 coinciding with the festival of Bhogi and Sankranti, following the postponement of major Telugu productions like RRR and Radhe Shyam.

== Reception ==
The film received negative reviews from critics, although praising the performances of lead cast but criticized the story, narration and second half. Pinkvilla gave the film a rating of 2.5/5 and wrote "DSP's catch-all music saves this generic, bland love story". 123 Telugu gave the film a rating of 2.75/5 and wrote "Rowdy Boys is a college drama with not many twists and turns. Ashish Reddy makes a decent debut and the first half is good. But a dull second half and lack of a strong story is a drawback. Youngsters might connect to the movie as it offers relatable elements. Just go in with low expectations and enjoy this college romance".

Sangeetha Devi K of The Hindu appreciated the music by Devi Sri Prasad and wrote: "The biggest issue with Rowdy Boys is that it can remind you of a bunch of older films, to the extent that it ends up like a patchwork of inspired sequences." A reviewer from Eenadu praised the storyline and chemistry between the leads while criticizing the screenplay.
