= Shourya (2016 film) =

2016 film by Dasaradh

- Theatrical release poster
- Directed by: Dasaradh
- Screenplay by: Gopimohan; Hari; Kishore Gopu
- Story by: Dasaradh
- Produced by: Malkapuram Shivakumar
- Starring: Manchu Manoj; Regina Cassandra
- Cinematography: V. Malhar Bhatt Joshi
- Edited by: M. S. Rajashekhar Reddy (S. R. Shekhar)
- Music by: K. Veda
- Production company: Suraksh Entertainments
- Release date: March 4, 2016
- Running time: 124 minutes
- Country: India
- Language: Telugu

Shourya is a 2016 Telugu romantic thriller film directed by Dasaradh. The film stars Manchu Manoj and Regina Cassandra in the lead roles. Shourya marks the second collaboration between Dasaradh and Manoj, following their first film Sri in 2005. The film was released worldwide on 4 March 2016 to negative reviews and performed poorly at the box office.

== Plot ==
Shourya and Netra are in love, but their relationship faces opposition from Netra's father and uncle. Determined to be together, they plan to elope and travel to the UK. Before their departure, they stop at Netra's village to spend the night at the village temple. During the night, an attempt is made on Netra's life, and Shourya is wrongly implicated in the crime. The police take the case seriously due to Netra's father being a Member of Parliament (MP), and Shourya is arrested and interrogated.

During the interrogation, Shourya recounts how he and Netra met and fell in love. While receiving treatment for her injuries, Netra dies in the hospital. Shourya is taken to court, where he initially confesses to killing her, claiming that Netra had betrayed him by agreeing to marry another man and meeting him secretly. He fabricates a story, leading the police to Netra's uncle's factory, where they discover multiple bodies, including those of Netra's sister and her husband. Netra's uncle admits to the murders, citing political motivations, and is arrested by the police.

Krishna Prasad, a detective, concludes that Shourya orchestrated the entire situation, creating false stories to implicate Netra's father and uncle. He also deduces that Netra is still alive. Krishna Prasad decides to spare Shourya from imprisoning the girl, recognising that he ultimately did the right thing. In the end, Shourya and Netra are reunited and live happily.

== Cast ==
- Manchu Manoj as Shourya
- Regina Cassandra as Netra
- Prakash Raj as CBI officer Krishna Prasad
- Nagineedu as Netra's father
- Subbaraju as Netra's uncle
- Nandu as Netra's fiancée
- Sayaji Shinde as Maheswara Rao, Nandu's father
- Brahmanandam as Sports Minister
- Banerjee as Police Officer
- Hema as Minister's wife
- Shravan as Shourya's friend

== Production ==
Plans to create the film were announced in May 2015 and Manchu Manoj was attached to the film, then titled "Production No 2". No lead actress was attached to the film at this time and production was expected to begin in the summer of that same year. The film's name was later titled Shourya and actress Regina Cassandra was confirmed as the movie's lead actress. Filming commenced later that year and in November about 75% of the film's shooting was completed. The following month digital posters were released for the film and the film was expected to release in January 2016. This release date was pushed back, as filming continued through January.

On 1 February 2016 the film's music received an audio release and the filming for Shourya was announced to be nearing completion. Shourya's producers had previously released one of the movie's reported five songs, "Tuppa Tuppa", online in December. Music for the film was composed by K Veda.

Manoj stated that the role would be a departure from his typical "rugged" roles and that "For the first time, I am playing an out and out uber cool stylish look in this film."

Dasaradh has stated that the film would be a "thrilling love story" and "concept-oriented".

== Soundtrack ==
No.	Title	Singer(s)	Length
1.	"Modata Ninu"	Vijay Prakash, Ramya Behara
2.	"Tuppara Tuppara"	Hemachandra, Thelu Vijaya, Kavya
3.	"O Manasa"	Yazin Nizar, Hemachandra, Roll Rider Rahul, Naresh Iyer, Rahul, Rahul Nambiar
4.	"Endukani"	Siddharth Watkins, Sai Charan
5.	"Raakasi Rabandu"	Ramki, Thelu Vijaya

== Release ==
Shourya was released on 4 March 2016 in 370 to 400 screens across Telangana and Andhra Pradesh.
