= Ugly Story =

2026 Indian Telugu-language film

- Theatrical release poster
- Directed by: Pranava Swaroop
- Written by: Pranava Swaroop
- Produced by: Bekkam Venugopal
- Starring: Nandu; Avika Gor
- Cinematography: Shrie Saikumaar Daara
- Edited by: Mithun Soma
- Music by: Shravan Bharadwaj
- Production company: Riya Jiya Productions
- Release date: 22 May 2026
- Running time: 123 minutes
- Country: India
- Language: Telugu

Ugly Story is 2026 Indian Telugu-language psychological thriller film written and directed by Pranava Swaroop. The film features Nandu and Avika Gor in lead roles. The film follows the story of a man who harbours a toxic, lifelong obsession for his wife.

== Cast ==
- Nandu as Karthik
- Avika Gor as Neha
- Sivaji Raja

== Release ==
Ugly Story was released theatrically on 22 May 2026. On 5 June 2026, the film was digitally released on Amazon Prime Video, JioHotstar and Aha.

== Reception ==
A critic from The Times of India rated the film 2 stars out of 5 and wrote “Ugly Story is undoubtedly committed to its premise and unafraid of difficult emotions. But while it succeeds in making viewers feel trapped inside its characters' emotional chaos, it struggles to transform that discomfort into a consistently compelling cinematic experience.”

Suresh Kavirayani of Cinema Express rated the film 3 stars out of 5 and said “ Ugly Story attempts to explore a bold and psychologically intense subject. Pranav Swaroop succeeds, to an extent, in presenting an emotional drama, backed by solid performances from Shree Nandu and Avika Gor.” Yash from Deccan Reviews rated the film 3.5 stars out of 5 and said “You do not have to be a big drama buff to enjoy this film because this film is perfect for those who like drama, with unpredictable characters and strong climax payoffs.”

Satya Pulagam of ABP Desam rated the film 2.5 stars out of 5 and wrote “It is difficult for Ugly Story to please all audiences. Sensitive minds cannot see that psychosis and the hellish agony that the wife experiences.”
