= Chi La Sow =

- Theatrical release poster
- Directed by: Rahul Ravindran
- Screenplay by: Rahul Ravindran
- Produced by: Nagarjuna; Jaswanth Nadipalli
- Starring: Sushanth; Ruhani Sharma
- Cinematography: M. Sukumar
- Edited by: Chota K. Prasad
- Music by: Prashanth R Vihari
- Production companies: Siruni Cine Corporation; Annapurna Studios
- Release date: 3 August 2018
- Running time: 130 minutes
- Country: India
- Language: Telugu

Chi La Sow (transl. Bride-to-be) is a 2018 Indian Telugu language romantic comedy film directed by Rahul Ravindran marked as his directorial debut. It stars Sushanth and Ruhani Sharma in the lead roles, marking the latter's debut in Telugu. Playback singer and voice artist Chinmayi, Rahul's spouse, lent her voice for Ruhani in the film. It is produced by Siruni Cine Corporation and presented by Annapurna Studios. Rahul won the National Film Award for Best Original Screenplay.

== Plot ==
Arjun, a carefree 27-year-old bachelor, has no plans to get married for at least another five years. A proud fan of Salman Khan and a devoted follower of Lord Hanuman, he enjoys his independence and often boasts about it. However, his parents constantly pressure him to settle down. His best friend and colleague, Sujit—a middle-aged bachelor desperately seeking marriage—joins Arjun's parents in convincing him to get married, hoping Arjun doesn't repeat his mistakes.

Eventually, Arjun's mother persuades him to at least meet a potential bride. During a casual conversation with Sujit, Arjun reveals his dreams before marriage: owning a sports car and traveling to Europe alone. He also confides that his fear of marriage stems from a failed relationship six years ago.

Arjun finally agrees to meet a 24-year-old traditional woman named Anjali in a match-making setup arranged at his home one evening. Disinterested, Arjun openly admits he doesn't want to marry. Offended, Anjali expresses her anger and snaps at her mother for forcing her into the meeting. Curious, Arjun asks about her mother, leading Anjali to share her emotional story.

After her father's death, Anjali's mother, Latha, fell into depression, which developed into bipolar disorder—making her extremely emotional, whether happy or sad. Anjali lives with her mother, younger sister Anu, and grandmother. As the sole breadwinner, she supports her family while her maternal uncle from Vijayawada checks on them regularly. Due to her mother's condition, many grooms have rejected Anjali, worsening Latha's depression and even driving her to attempt suicide. Determined to save her mother, Anjali decided to marry whoever agreed to the proposal, hoping it would ease her mother's pain.

Hearing this, Arjun feels deep sympathy for Anjali. They start conversing more comfortably, sharing their interests and awkward matchmaking experiences. When Anjali gets ready to leave, Arjun stops her, expressing a desire to meet again. She refuses and firmly asks him to give a clear yes or no about the marriage. Confused, Arjun impulsively says "yes." However, Anjali rejects him, calling him childish and immature, and walks away.

Later that night, Anjali's mother is hospitalized due to high blood pressure. In a rush, the family forgets to lock their front door. A delivery boy sneaks in to steal valuables but gets trapped when the door accidentally locks. Meanwhile, learning about her mother's condition, Anjali decides to go to the hospital. Arjun offers her a lift, and with no other option at midnight, she accepts. After dropping her off, Arjun joins her inside to see her mother. Her family, seeing them together, mistakenly assumes the matchmaking was successful. Alarmed, Anjali warns Arjun to leave before anyone misunderstands further.

Soon after, Anjali realizes she needs to collect her mother's insurance card from home to pay the hospital bills. Once again, she has no choice but to accept Arjun's help to get there. On the way, they stop for some street food. When they arrive at her home, the trapped delivery boy attacks Arjun, knocking him unconscious. Panicked, Anjali fights back and injures the thief. When Arjun regains consciousness, he alerts the neighbors and helps subdue the intruder. Thinking the man is dead, both Anjali and Arjun panic about the consequences.

The police arrive, led by a quirky Sub-Inspector (SI) who takes them into custody. During questioning, Anjali tells the truth, but Arjun takes the blame, saying he killed the thief to protect her. The SI later discovers the thief is actually alive but takes advantage of the situation to extort money, demanding a ransom to clear their names. Without hesitation, Arjun offers all his savings—₹12 lakhs—meant for his dream sports car and Europe trip. Just then, a constable bursts in, announcing that the thief has regained consciousness and escaped from the ambulance. The SI, realizing the truth, releases them. Moved by Arjun's selflessness and maturity, Anjali begins to fall for him.

They return to the hospital with the insurance card, only to find Anjali's grandmother sick due to lack of sleep. Arjun decides to get her some orange juice and wakes up a grumpy Sujit at 2 a.m. Sujit, already annoyed by Arjun's mother's taunts, reluctantly helps. In a series of comical events involving an angry neighbor and her husband, Sujit finally gets the juice. Meanwhile, Anjali grows upset over Arjun's sudden disappearance and tells her grandmother she shouldn't depend emotionally on anyone.

Arjun and Sujit finally return to the hospital. There, Anjali's uncle arrives unexpectedly to check on his sister. After meeting Arjun, he shares Anjali's past—how she became the family's pillar at just 14, taking tuition classes after her father's death to support them. Despite her uncle's financial struggles, she remained optimistic and refused help even after he recovered financially. Deeply impressed by her strength and maturity, Arjun realizes he's truly in love with her and decides to marry her.

Later, Latha regains consciousness, and everyone visits her. Seeing Arjun, she happily assumes the marriage is fixed. Privately, she tells him she doesn't want to be a burden on them and plans to leave after their wedding. Arjun reassures her warmly, saying she's Anjali's strength and not a burden to anyone. He promises to keep her close and care for her like his own mother.

Seeing this, Anjali grows even fonder of Arjun. As they spend more time together—from the hospital to her home—she slowly opens up to him. In a tender moment, she confesses her feelings. Arjun then proposes marriage, and Anjali accepts. He impulsively takes her to a temple for an immediate wedding. Shocked but secretly happy, Anjali hesitates, calling him hasty but still agrees. Before the ceremony, Arjun admits he isn't a virgin, to which Anjali responds with understanding and acceptance. They marry early the next morning.

Meanwhile, at the hospital, a sleep-deprived Sujit accidentally falls asleep in the ICU, and the doctors mistake him for a patient, taking him into surgery. He wakes up mid-procedure, panics, and runs out of the hospital. Back home, Arjun's parents faint upon hearing about his sudden marriage but later recover and happily accept the union.

The film ends with Arjun and Anjali embarking on their new journey together—Arjun finally fulfilling his dreams, this time with Anjali by his side.

---

== Cast ==
- Sushanth as Arjun
- Ruhani Sharma as Anjali (Voice dubbed by Chinmayi)
- Vennela Kishore as Sujith
- Anu Hasan as Arjun's mother
- Rohini as Latha, Anjali's mother
- Vidyullekha Raman as Anu, Anjali's sister
- Jayaprakash as Anjali's uncle
- Sanjay Swaroop as Arjun's father
- Rahul Ramakrishna as a police officer
- Harish Koyalagundla as a police constable

== Music ==
The score was composed by Prashanth R Vihari, with all songs penned by Kittu Vissapragada except Mellaga Mellaga, which was written by Sri Sai Kiran.

Chi La Sow

Soundtrack album by Prashanth R Vihari
- Released: 2018
- Recorded: 2018
- Genre: Soundtrack
- Language: Telugu
- Label: Aditya Music
- Producer: Prashanth R Vihari

Prashanth R Vihari chronology
Adhugo (2018)	Chi La Sow (2018)	Antariksham 9000 KMPH (2018)

Track list
No.	Title	Lyrics	Singer(s)	Length
1.	"Down Down"	Kittu Vissapragada	Kaala Bhairava, Ernest Abraham
2.	"Mellaga Mellaga"	Sri Sai Kiran	Chinmayi
3.	"Solo Solo"	Kittu Vissapragada	Prashanth R Vihari, Diwakar, Naresh Iyer
4.	"Varshinche"	Kittu Vissapragada	Abhijit Rao, Ravi Prakash Chodimalla
5.	"Chi La Sow"	Kittu Vissapragada	Diwakar, Chinmayi, Pranav Chaganty

== Reception ==
The New Indian Express rated it 3/5, stating: "The idea of a guy falling for and deciding to marry a girl in just a few hours that he spends with her might sound crazy."

Times of India rated it 3/5, stating: "For those looking for entertainment as understood today, this may not be the film."

India Today rated it 3/5, stating: "Chi La Sow is not a film that will impress you from the first frame. As the story progresses, you end up falling in love with the characters; you can't help it."

Deccan Chronicle rated it 3/5, stating: "After trying his hand at a few commercial films, Sushanth tries a different role with this movie and does full justice to his character Arjun."

The NEWS Minute stated: "This is a clean movie that appeals to urban sensibilities, with a story panning out across one night."

== Awards and nominations ==
Year	Award	Category	Nominee	Result	Ref
2019	66th National Film Awards	National Film Award for Best Original Screenplay	Rahul Ravindran	Won	
2019	South Indian International Movie Awards	Best Debut Actress	Ruhani Sharma	Nominated	
2019	South Indian International Movie Awards	Best Comedian	Vennela Kishore	Nominated	
2019	South Indian International Movie Awards	Best Debut Director	Rahul Ravindran	Nominated	
