= Antariksham 9000 KMPH =

- Official poster
- Directed by: Sankalp Reddy
- Written by: Sankalp Reddy
- Produced by: Saibabu Jagarlamudi; Yeduguru Rajeev Reddy; Radha Krishna Jagarlamudi
- Starring: Varun Tej; Aditi Rao Hydari; Lavanya Tripathi; Rahman
- Cinematography: Gnana Shekar V. S.
- Edited by: Karthika Srinivas
- Music by: Prashanth R Vihari
- Production company: First Frame Entertainments
- Release date: 21 December 2018
- Running time: 140 minutes
- Country: India
- Language: Telugu
- Budget: ₹25–30 crore
- Box office: ₹16.1 crore

Antariksham 9000 KMPH (lit. 'Space: 9000 KMPH') is a 2018 Indian Telugu-language science fiction adventure film written and directed by Sankalp Reddy. The film stars Varun Tej, Aditi Rao Hydari, Lavanya Tripathi, and Rahman while Srinivas Avasarala, Satyadev, and Raja Chembolu play supporting roles. The film was released on 21 December 2018.

== Plot ==
The film begins with a satellite moving into the darker side of the Moon. One of the Indian satellites, Mihira, has lost connection with the Space Station and is losing speed. This would lead to a collision with Chinese satellite and would lead to chain reaction resulting in a communication blackout across the world. The system codes to make repairs is known only to Dev - a passionate scientist at the station, who had quit the Space program five years ago. He was in love with the Station Director Chandrakanth's daughter, Paaru, a school teacher. He passionately works on Viprayaan, a satellite that will give data about water in the Moon. There is a glitch in the satellite after its takeoff and Dev drives to the space station to fix it, along with his fiancee. He loses control of the car in his rush and meets with an accident, losing both the satellite and his fiancée. This breaks him and he quits his job. He is now needed to fix Mihira and he comes back after five years from his life as a school teacher as part of the mission and manages to fix the critical glitch with the help of Riya, his colleague.

== Cast ==
- Varun Tej as Dev
- Aditi Rao Hydari as Riya
- Lavanya Tripathi as Parvathi "Paaru"
- Rahman as Director of ISC, Chandrakanth, Parvathi's father
- Satyadev as Karan and Aditya (Dual role)
- Srinivas Avasarala as Mohan
- Raja Chembolu as Sanjay
- Kunal Kaushik as Kunal
- Tharakesh as Dev's brother
- Pavani Gangireddy
- Muralidhar Goud

== Production ==
Principal photography of the film began on 19 April 2018. The shooting of the film was completed on 1 October 2018. Many scenes of the film were shot in zero-gravity sets in Hyderabad. Some crucial scenes were shot in Mahindra École Centrale, which stood in for Indian Space Research Organisation in the film.

== Soundtrack ==
The music was composed by Prashanth R Vihari and released on Aditya Music.

Antariksham 9000 KMPH

Soundtrack album by Prashanth R Vihari
- Released: 15 December 2018
- Recorded: 2018
- Genre: Soundtrack
- Length: 17:37
- Label: Aditya Music
- Producer: Prashanth R Vihari

Prashanth R Vihari chronology
Chi La Sow (2018)	Antariksham 9000 KMPH (2018)	Dorasaani (2019)

No.	Title	Lyrics	Singer(s)	Length
1.	"Samayama"	Ananta Sriram	Yazin Nizar, Harini	4:06
2.	"Palukave"	Ananta Sriram	Anurag Kulkarni	2:50
3.	"Telipo Telipo"	Ananta Sriram	Manisha Eerabathini	2:54
4.	"Dheemaga"	Sirivennela Seetharama Sastry	Benny Dayal, Anurag Kulkarni	4:46
5.	"Antarikshayanam"	Sirivennela Seetharama Sastry	Kaala Bhairava	2:51
6.	"The Spirit Of Antariksham 9000KMPH Theme"		Prashanth R Vihari	3:04
Total length:				20:28

== Critical reception ==
Neeshita Nyayapati of The Times of India stated that Antariksham is unnecessarily melodramatic and gave the film 2.5 stars. Sangeetha Devi of The Hindu praised the production values of the film.

== Release ==
The film released on 21 December 2018.
