= Nandu (Telugu actor) =

Indian Telugu actor

Nandu (Sree Nandu)
- Born: Brahmananda Vijaya Sri Krishna Sarma
- Occupation: Actor
- Years active: 2006–present
- Spouse: Geetha Madhuri
- Children: 2

Nandu is an Indian actor and host who works in Telugu films. He debuted with Photo (2006) and is best known for his role in 100% Love (2011).

== Career ==
Nandu made his lead debut with the thriller film Photo (2006) starring Muktha and Anjali under the stage name of Anand. After playing a negative role in Sukumar's 100% Love, he went on to play the lead roles in several films notably including Ram Gopal Varma's 365 Days (2015) with Anaika Soti. That same year, he played the lead role in Best Actors. Regarding his performance, a critic from The Times of India wrote, "Nandu delivered a decent performance, aptly displaying emotions. His performance has a comfort level that makes his acting seem natural". After starring in several low-budget films, Nandu starred in Sawaari in 2020. The film released to positive reviews with a critic noting that "Nandu comes out of his comfort zone and steals the show right from the get-go".

== Personal life ==
Nandu is married to Geetha Madhuri with whom he has a daughter and a son.

== Legal issues ==
In 2017, Nandu appeared before the Special Investigation Team (SIT) of Telangana’s excise department as part of a probe into a high-profile drug racket in Hyderabad. Media reports stated that he was among several individuals from the Telugu film industry summoned for questioning in connection with the investigation. He later appeared before the Enforcement Directorate for questioning related to a money laundering inquiry linked to the same case, with authorities examining financial records as part of the ongoing probe.

== Filmography ==
=== Film ===
- All films are in Telugu, unless otherwise noted.

Year	Title	Role	Notes
2006	Photo	Siddhu	credited as Anand
2008	Khiladi No. 1	Vijay	Bhojpuri film; dubbed into Telugu as Bhairavi
2009	Preminche Rojullo		credited as Vijay Nandu
2011	100% Love	Ajit Jogi	credited as Anand
2011	Nenu Nanna Abaddam	Kiran	
2012	Idhayam Thiraiarangam	Kumar	Tamil film; credited as Anand
2014	Autonagar Surya	Kiccha	
2014	Paathasala	Raju	
2014	Rabhasa	Vaibhav	
2014	Ice Cream 2		
2015	Pesarattu	Yuvaraj	
2015	Serndhu Polama	Tony	Tamil film
2015	365 Days	Apoorva	
2015	Superstar Kidnap	Nandu	
2015	Best Actors	Nandu	
2016	Shourya	Netra's fiancé	
2016	Pelli Choopulu	Vikram	
2017	Pichiga Nachav		
2017	Jaya Janaki Nayaka	Prudhvi Chakravarthy	
2017	Raju Gari Gadhi 2	Nandu	
2017	B.Tech Babulu		
2017	Kutumba Katha Chitram	Charan	
2018	Sammohanam	Kishore Babu	
2018	Inthalo Yennenni Vintalo	Vishnu	
2018	Enduko Emo	Karthick	
2019	Sivaranjani	Karthik	
2020	Savaari	Raju	
2022	Sehari	Passerby	Cameo appearance
2022	Bomma Blockbuster	Pothuraju	
2025	Dhandoraa	Vishnu	credited as Shree Nandu
2026	Psych Siddhartha	Siddhartha Reddy	credited as Shree Nandu
2026	Vanaveera	Deva	
2026	Vowels	Martin	Tamil anthology film; credited as Nandu Vijaya Krishna
2026	Ugly Story	Karthik	

==== As dubbing artist ====
Year	Title	Actor	Ref.
2015	Size Zero	Arya	

=== Television ===
- All titles are in Telugu, unless otherwise noted.

Year	Title	Role	Network	Notes
2018	Hey Krishna	Lord Krishna	Yupp TV	
2023	Vadhuvu	Anand	Disney+ Hotstar	
2023	Mansion 24	Lilly	Disney+ Hotstar	
2024	The Mystery of Moksha Island	Vikram (Vicky)	Disney+ Hotstar	
