= Dorasaani =

2019 Telugu film

- Theatrical release poster
- Directed by: KVR Mahendra
- Written by: KVR Mahendra
- Produced by: Madhura Sreedhar Reddy; Yash Rangineni
- Starring: Anand Deverakonda; Shivathmika Rajashekar
- Cinematography: Sunny Kurapati
- Edited by: Naveen Nooli
- Music by: Prashanth R Vihari
- Release date: 12 July 2019
- Running time: 130 minutes
- Country: India
- Language: Telugu

Dorasaani (transl. Madam) is a 2019 Indian Telugu-language romantic drama film directed by KVR Mahendra and starring debutants Anand Deverakonda and Shivathmika Rajashekar.

== Plot ==
The film starts with Shankaranna, a naxalite, being released from jail after 30 years of false imprisonment. He goes to a village and enquires about Raju, but nobody seems to know him. Shankar explores around his now changed village. Then, a man meets him, claiming to know Raju. He introduces himself as Siddadu, the ex-henchman of Raja Reddy, and also recognizes Shankaranna. The story flashes back to the 1980s.

Raju is the son of a painter, from a lower caste, in rural Telangana. Devaki is the daughter (or dorasaani) of Raja Reddy (the dora). Imprisoned in her own bungalow, Devaki wants to be free and openly interact with the people in the village. Since she is motherless, her father and the domestic maid (dasi) take utmost care of her. Raju sees Devaki at a festival and falls in love with her. He starts seeing her through her window, from outside the bungalow. Raju eventually takes a disguised Devaki and explores the village, careful not to alert her father and his henchmen.

Devaki is spellbound by Raju's honest and innocent nature. However, Raja Reddy's henchmen notice and follow them. When Raju drops off Devaki at the bungalow, the henchmen beat him up and warn him to leave the village, but do not tell Raja Reddy. When Raju is about to leave the village, as per his father's orders, he gets stuck in there due to the 48-hour curfew arranged by Shankar and his naxalites. Raja Reddy eventually learns about Devaki and Raju's relationship. He makes Devaki leave for his elder son's house under a false pretense and also ensures that Raju is arrested. Upon learning this through a villager, Devaki escapes from her brother's house. In the meantime, Raju meets Shankar in prison, and Raja Reddy frames Raju as a naxalite. As a result, their encounter is arranged. Shankar helps Raju escape from jail.

Upon reaching Devaki, they both decide to elope from the village. They then head to Devaki's brother, who surprisingly accepts their relationship. He also promises to drive them to Hyderabad. The next day, Devaki's brother drives them to the local police station first to lodge a complaint on their behalf, but he decides against it, stating that the proceedings will take a long time. He then drives the car, stops it in the middle of nowhere, shoots both Raju and Devaki to death, and burns the car with them inside.

In the present, Shankar is devastated upon hearing about what happened to Raju and Devaki. Siddadu tells him that Raju won at the moment Devaki fell for him, and when they both sacrificed each other, for their love.

== Cast ==
- Anand Deverakonda as Raju
- Shivathmika Rajashekar as Devaki Reddy, the dorasaani
- Vinay Varma as Raja Reddy, the dora
- Sharanya Pradeep as the domestic maid or dasi
- Byreddy Vamsi Krishna Reddy as Prathap Reddy
- Kishore as Shankaranna, the naxal leader
- Surabhi Prabhavati as Raju's mother
- N. Dasharatha Reddy as Raju's father
- Anurag Parvathaneni as Siddadu, dora's henchman
- Shravan Kotha as Abdulla, Raju's friend
- Sunny Palle as Seenu, Raju's friend

== Music ==
The songs were composed by Prashanth R Vihari, and the soundtrack was produced under the label Madhura Audio.

Dorasani

Soundtrack album by Prashanth R Vihari
- Released: 2019
- Genre: Soundtrack
- Language: Telugu
- Label: Madhura Audio
- Producer: Prashanth R Vihari

Prashanth R Vihari chronology
Antariksham 9000 KMPH (2018)	Dorasani (2019)	Raja Vikramarka (2021 film) (2021)

Track List
No.	Title	Lyrics	Artist(s)	Length
1.	"Ningilona Paalapuntha"	Goreti Venkanna	Anurag Kulkarni	04:21
2.	"Kallallo Kala Varamai"	Shreshta	Chinmayi	04:07
3.	"Kappathalli"	Goreti Venkanna	Anurag Kulkarni	03:16
4.	"Aadi Pade"	Ramajogayya Sastri	Lokeshwar	04:11

== Release and reception ==
The film released on 12 July 2019.

The Times of India gave the film 3.5/5 stars and praised the performances of the cast, cinematography, and music. The Deccan Chronicle gave the film 3/5 stars and also praised the cast and crew. The Hindu praised the film but criticized the lack of development of the plot and subplots. Similar to The Hindu review, The New Indian Express stated the film lacked an "engaging love story".
