= Prashanth R Vihari =

Indian music composer

Prashanth R. Vihari
- Occupation: Music director
- Years active: 2017 – present

Prashanth R. Vihari is an Indian music composer who works in Telugu-language films. He is known for his work in Chi La Sow (2018) and Dorasaani (2019).

He did his B.tech from Kakatiya institute of technology and science (KITS WARANGAL).

== Career ==
Vihari began his music career at A. R. Rahman's KM Music Conservatory and LV Prasad Film Academy. Yakub Ali signed Vihari to make his debut with Vellipomakey after Ali saw Vihari's "Suttum Vizhi Chudar Thaan Kannamma", a rendition of Bharatiyar's poem. The soundtrack of Vellipomakey garnered acclaim after media celebrities shared the soundtrack online. After listening to his music from Vellipomakey, Raj Kandukuri offered him the chance to compose the music for Mental Madhilo (2017). Vihari also composed music for the space-themed Antariksham 9000 KMPH (2018).

== Discography ==
=== Soundtrack and score ===
Year	Film	Language	Notes
2017	Vellipomakey	Telugu	
2017	Mental Madhilo	Telugu	
2018	Adhugo	Telugu	
2018	Chi La Sow	Telugu	
2018	Antariksham 9000 KMPH	Telugu; Hindi	
2019	Dorasaani	Telugu	
2021	Raja Vikramarka	Telugu	
2021	Sehari	Telugu	
2021	Skylab	Telugu	
2022	Panchathantram	Telugu	
2022	Bomma Blockbuster	Telugu	
2022	Masooda	Telugu	
2023	IB71	Hindi	Score only
2025	The Girlfriend	Telugu	Score only
2026	Nawab Cafe	Telugu	
2026	Beep	Tamil	

=== Television ===
- The Baker and The Beauty (2021)
- Pitta Kathalu (2021)
- ATM (2023)
