= Rajanna (soundtrack) =

Soundtrack album by M. M. Keeravani
- Released: 25 November 2011
- Recorded: 2011
- Genre: Feature film soundtrack
- Length: 36:38
- Language: Telugu
- Label: Vel Records
- Producer: M. M. Keeravani

M. M. Keeravani chronology
Badrinath (2011)	Rajanna (2011)	Dammu (2012)

Rajanna is the soundtrack album to the 2011 film of the same name directed by V. Vijayendra Prasad, starring Nagarjuna, Sneha, Shwetha Menon and Baby Annie. The musical score and soundtrack were composed by M. M. Keeravani and featured 12 songs with lyrics written by Anantha Sriram, Suddala Ashok Teja, K. Sivasakthi Datta, Mittapalli Surendar and Chaitanya Prasad. The soundtrack was released under the Vel Records label on 25 November 2011, to positive reviews from critics and received two nominations at the Filmfare Awards South, including Best Music Director – Telugu for Keeravani.

== Background and development ==
The film's music is composed by M. M. Keeravani in his 13th collaboration with Nagarjuna. (Note: M. M. Keeravani had previously composed for Nagarjuna's President Gari Pellam (1992), Rakshana (1993), Varasudu (1993), Allari Alludu (1993), Criminal (1994), Gharana Bullodu (1995), Annamayya (1997), Seetharama Raju (1999), Bava Nachadu (2001), Akasa Veedhilo (2001), Nenunnanu (2004) and Sri Ramadasu (2011).) (Note: However, Nagarjuna's interview with Radhika Rajamani of Rediff.com, prior to his release, claimed Rajanna being his 16th or 17th collaboration with Keeravani.) Keeravani heard the script of Rajanna during the production of Chatrapathi (2005) and has been worked on the film since its inception; he described it as a rare opportunity for any music director, as the music never dominated the lyrics, thus providing him scope for composing music with lyrical quality.

Keeravani had provided 12 songs for Rajanna, with most of the lyrics being written by his father K. Sivasakthi Datta, Anantha Sriram, Suddala Ashok Teja, Mittapalli Surendar and Chaitanya Prasad. Most of the songs were background montages and did not provide any choreography, except for "Lachchuvamma Lachchuvamma". Unlike songs set in the Telangana backdrop having an aggression, Keeravani had composed melodious songs, due to its requirements in the story, as each song had varied emotions. He recorded the background score within 25 days.

== Album information ==
The film opens with the song, "Gijjigadu", written by Sivasakthi Datta, and recorded by Mumbai-based singer Sanjeev Chimmalgi, in his first Telugu song. "Goodu Chedirindi" was described as the expansion to "Gijjigadu" which occurs in a crucial sequence and was recorded by Shweta Pandit. The song "Karakuraathi Gundello" was rendered by Keeravani and Kailash Kher. While Keeravani personally liked Kailash's version due to his voice having "rustic and raw emotions", Keeravani also recorded his portions owing to Prasad's insistence.

The opening lyrics of "Vey Vey", sung by L. V. Revanth, was taken from Suddala Hanmanthu's literature, which Ashok Teja changed it to suit the story. The song was filmed by S. S. Rajamouli. The song "Lachchuvamma Lachchuvamma" was written in Gondu language, which Keeravani called it as the fun folk song, while experimenting with the instruments. It was recorded by Rahul Nambiar, Deepu, Sravana Bhargavi. On the song "Melukove Chitti Talli". "Raa Ree Ro Rela" is a ballet number and had numerous singers recording their vocals. Keeravani described "Chittiguvva" as the "most confusing song in the album" as many incidents take place in the song sequence.

The song "Dorasani Korada" is a bit song composed in the Carnatic raga Sankarabharanam. The song "Okka Kshanam" was added on Prasad's choice, though even he liked the song, did not want to be rendered in a delirious pitch. "Kalligajje" was written and sung by Mittapalli Surendar, in his debut. He was introduced to Keeravani, by R. Narayana Murthy. The climactic song "Amma Avani" was composed in the raga Mohanam. Keeravani added that the song resembled "Ye Swasalo" from Nenunnanu (2004) as the song occurs in a singing competition, like this film; while K. S. Chithra had sung "Ye Swasalo", the song "Amma Avani" was sung by Malavika as it was meant for the character played by Baby Annie.

== Release ==
The film's music was launched on 25 November 2011. Unlike big-budget Telugu films, which had audio launches to promote and release the music, Nagarjuna and Keeravani decided to release the soundtrack album directly through the market, under Keeravani's Vel Records label. Nagarjuna added: "If the music is really good, you need not create a hungama for people to sit up and notice. It will automatically happen." After its release, the songs topped the charts and sales, providing high consumer response which resulted in the film's release being preponed by a day.

== Track listing ==
No.	Title	Lyrics	Singer(s)	Length
1.	"Gijjigadu"	K. Sivasakthi Datta	Sanjeev Chimmalgi, Kaala Bhairava	2:53
2.	"Raa Ree Ro Rela"	Ananta Sriram	L. V. Revanth, K. Sahiti, Sravana Bhargavi, Madhumitha, Amritha Varshini, Ramya Behara	3:34
3.	"Karakuraathi Gundello"	K. Sivasakthi Datta	M. M. Keeravani, Kailash Kher	3:32
4.	"Lachchuvamma Lachchuvamma"	Suddala Ashok Teja	Rahul Nambiar, Deepu, Sravana Bhargavi	4:57
5.	"Chittiguvva"	Ananta Sriram	Sanjeev Chimmalgi, Venu, Sivani, Ramya Behara	3:17
6.	"Okka Kshanam"	Ananta Sriram	Rahul Nambiar, Deepu, L. V. Revanth, M. K. Balaji, Prithvi Chandra	1:52
7.	"Goodu Chediri Koyila"	K. Sivasakthi Datta	Shweta Pandit	3:39
8.	"Kaligajje"	Mittapalli Surendar	Mittapalli Surendar, Chaitra	1:35
9.	"Vey Vey"	Suddala Ashok Teja	M. M. Keeravani, L. V. Revanth	3:17
10.	"Dorasani Korada"	Mittapalli Surendar	Amrutha Varshini	1:11
11.	"Melukove Chittitalli"	Chaitanya Prasad	Sudharsini	2:12
12.	"Amma Avani"	K. Sivasakthi Datta	Malavika	4:38
Total length:				36:38

== Reception ==
Karthik Srinivasan of Milliblog praised the music, saying "Rajanna is a thematically apt and rich musical offering from the veteran composer." Radhika Rajamani of Rediff.com wrote "M M Keeravani's music and background score is outstanding. It's easy on the ear and in sync with the film's narrative. The folk feel of the music enhances the story. Some of the songs like Veyyi Veyyi, Gijigaadu, Amma Avani (the last song in raga Mohanam) are noteworthy." Atul Chaturvedi of Bangalore Mirror stated "M M Keeravani does complete justice with his music." NDTV noted "The music and background score is noteworthy and the song Veyyi... Veyyi... is outstanding." Sangeetha Devi Dundoo of The Hindu stated "M.M. Keeravani's music serves as a backbone to this story that's propelled by music."

== Accolades ==
Award (Note: Awards, festivals and organizations are in alphabetical order.)	Date of ceremony (Note: Date is linked to the article about the awards held that year, wherever possible.)	Category	Recipient(s)	Result	Ref.
Filmfare Awards South	7 July 2012	Best Music Director – Telugu	M. M. Keeravani	Nominated	
Filmfare Awards South	7 July 2012	Best Lyricist – Telugu	Suddala Ashok Teja – ("Lachuvamma Lachuvamma")	Nominated	
Mirchi Music Awards South	4 August 2012	Best Album of the Year	Rajanna	Nominated	
Mirchi Music Awards South	4 August 2012	Best Song of the Year	"Amma Avani"	Nominated	
Mirchi Music Awards South	4 August 2012	Music Composer of the Year	M. M. Keeravani – ("Amma Avani")	Nominated	
Mirchi Music Awards South	4 August 2012	Lyricist of the Year	K. Sivasakthi Datta – ("Gijigadu")	Nominated	
Mirchi Music Awards South	4 August 2012	Female Vocalist of the Year	Malavika – ("Amma Avani")	Nominated	
Mirchi Music Awards South	4 August 2012	Upcoming Male Vocalist of the Year	Sanjeev Chimmalgi, Kaala Bhairava – ("Gijigadu")	Nominated	
Mirchi Music Awards South	4 August 2012	Upcoming Female Vocalist of the Year	Sudharsini – ("Melukove Chittitalli")	Nominated	
Mirchi Music Awards South	4 August 2012	Technical – Sound Mixing of the Year	A.R. Subhash – ("Kaligajje")	Nominated	
Nandi Awards	13 October 2012	Best Female Playback Singer	Malavika – ("Amma Avani")	Won	
South Indian International Movie Awards	21–22 June 2012	Best Music Director – Telugu	M. M. Keeravani	Nominated	
South Indian International Movie Awards	21–22 June 2012	Best Lyricist – Telugu	K. Sivadatta – ("Gijigadu")	Nominated	
South Indian International Movie Awards	21–22 June 2012	Best Female Playback Singer – Telugu	Malavika – ("Amma Avani Nelathalli Ani")	Nominated	
