= Nela Ticket =

2018 film by Ram Talluri

- Movie poster
- Directed by: Kalyan Krishna Kurasala
- Screenplay by: Satyanand
- Story by: Kalyan Krishna Kurasala
- Produced by: Ram Talluri
- Starring: Ravi Teja; Malvika Sharma; Jagapathi Babu
- Cinematography: Mukesh Gnanesh
- Edited by: Chota K. Prasad
- Music by: Shakthikanth Karthick
- Production company: SRT Entertainments
- Release date: 25 May 2018
- Running time: 171 minutes
- Country: India
- Language: Telugu
- Box office: ₹20.1 crore

Nela Ticket (transl. Lower Class Ticket) is a 2018 Indian Telugu-language action comedy film, produced by Ram Talluri on his production banner SRT Entertainments and directed by Kalyan Krishna Kurasala. It features Ravi Teja, Malvika Sharma, Jagapathi Babu in the lead roles and music composed by Shakti Kanth Karthick. The film released worldwide on 25 May 2018.

== Plot ==
Nela Ticket (Ravi Teja) is an orphan raised in an orphanage in Bangalore belonging to Ananda Bhupathi (Sarath Babu). Ananda gets killed by his own son Aditya Bhupathi (Jagapathi Babu), who later becomes the Home Minister. Nela Ticket runs into a tussle with Aditya's men, and this brings both Aditya and Nela Ticket opposite each other. The fight that happens between them and how Nela Ticket brings Aditya to justice forms the plot.

== Cast ==
- Ravi Teja as Nela Ticket/Ravi Teja
- Jagapathi Babu as Home Minister Aditya Bhupathi
- Malvika Sharma as Malvika
- Sarath Babu as Ananda Bhupathi
- Sampath Raj as ACP Sampath Reddy
- Brahmanandam as Balaraju
- Ali as Ali
- Priyadarshi Pullikonda as Lawyer Yadagiri
- Posani Krishna Murali as Posani
- Tanikella Bharani as Chief Minister
- Jaya Prakash Reddy as C. P. Ranjith Kumar
- Prudhvi Raj as KK
- Ajay as Anwar
- Subbaraju as Vikram
- Raghu Babu as Aditya's assistant
- Brahmaji as Home Secretary
- Chitram Srinu as Nela Ticket's friend
- L. B. Sriram as an Old man
- Annapurna as Old man's wife
- Prabhas Sreenu as Old man's elder son
- Madhunandan as Old man's younger son
- Priya as Old man's elder daughter-in-law
- Satya Krishnan as Old man's younger daughter-in-law
- Surekha Vani as Doctor
- Praveen as Rajesh
- Sivaji Raja as Govt Officer
- Fish Venkat as Auto Driver
- Rajitha as Old man's neighbour
- Jyothi
- Karuna as Gowthami's mother who died in train Accident
- Raghu Karumanchi as Fake Circle Inspector of Sanathnagar

== Production ==
=== Development ===
In August 2016 US based NRI, Ram Talluri signed Ravi Teja for his next film. After much delay, in December 2017 director Kalyan Krishna Kurasala joined the project and Mumbai based model Malvika Sharma was signed in as a female lead, which marks her debut in cinema.

Jagapathi Babu was also signed to play the main antagonist and Shakthi Kanth Karthick joined as a music composer.

=== Filming ===
Principal photography began on 5 January 2018 in Hyderabad. The shoot was wrapped up in early May 2018.

== Release ==
The film was theatrically released on 25 May 2018.

== Soundtrack ==
Nela Ticket

Soundtrack album by Shakthikanth Karthick
- Released: 10 May 2018
- Recorded: 2018
- Genre: Soundtrack
- Length: 24:07
- Label: Lahari Music
- Producer: Shakthi Kanth Karthick

Shakthikanth Karthick chronology
Fidaa (2017)	Nela Ticket (2018)	Happy Wedding (2018)

The music is composed by Shakthikanth Karthick, and was released by Lahari Music Company, who held the audio launch on 10 May 2018 with Pawan Kalyan.

Track-List
No.	Title	Lyrics	Singer(s)	Length
1.	"O Sari Try Chei"	Bhaskarabhatla	Mallikarjun	4:22
2.	"Bijili"	Chaitanya Pingali	Prudhvi Chandra, Janani Sanjeevi	4:02
3.	"Love You Love You"	Chaitanya Pingali	Sri Krishna, Ramya Behara	3:52
4.	"Nela Ticket"	Ramajogayya Sastry	Simha, Madhu Priya	3:51
5.	"Chuttu Janam"	Sirivennela Sitarama Sastry	Vijay Yesudas	4:31
6.	"Namaste"	Suddala Ashok Teja	PVNS Rohith
Total length:				24:07

== Reception ==
In its review of the film, The Times of India gave a rating of 1.5/5 and wrote “Mindless action scenes, love at first sight (quite literally), a dozen comedians who fail to evoke laughter, an evil politician and an aloof, goofy young man who suddenly turns into a saviour. Sounds familiar? Ravi Teja’s latest venture Nela Ticket is as predictable as they come. Loud and boorish, this Kalyan Krishna directorial lacks imagination and creativity.”

The Hindustan Times gave a rating of 1.5/5 and wrote “Nela Ticket scores low on sensitivity though with its rape jokes and the lead’s stalker-like behavior. Was it necessary to have a character threaten rape to get his way? Isn’t it time for Tollywood to lose this trope to get audiences to laugh, because it is tone-deaf and insensitive. And really, what is funny about it?”.
