= Nandi Awards of 2011 =

Indian Telugu film and TV awards ceremony

Nandi Awards for the year 2011 announced by Andhra Pradesh Government on 13 October 2012. Nandamuri Balakrishna starrer Sri Rama Rajyam won the best film award followed by Nagarjuna’s Rajanna and Srikanth’s Virodhi. Mahesh Babu won Best actor Award for his performance in the super hit film Dookudu. Akkineni Nagarjuna won the special jury award for his performance in Rajanna and Nayantara won the best actress award for her performance in Sri Ramarajyam.

== Winners list ==
Category	Winner	Film	Nandi Type
Best Feature Film	Sai Babu	Sri Rama Rajyam	Gold
Second Best Feature Film	Nagarjuna Akkineni	Rajanna	Silver
Third Best Feature Film	Anil Meka	Virodhi	Bronze
Best Actor	Mahesh Babu	Dookudu	Silver
Best Director	N. Shankar	Jai Bolo Telangana	Silver
Best Actress	Nayanthara	Sri Rama Rajyam	Silver
Best Supporting Actor	Prakash Raj	Dookudu	Copper
Best Supporting Actress	Sujatha Reddy	Inkennallu	Copper
Best Character Actor	Gandhi	Rajanna	Copper
Best Male Comedian	M. S. Narayana	Dookudu	Copper
Best Female Comedian	Ratnasagar	Karalu Miriyalu	Copper
Best Villain	Lakshmi Manchu	Anaganaga O Dheerudu	Copper
Best Cinematographer	P. R. K. Raju	Sri Rama Rajyam	Copper
Best Music Director	Ilaiyaraaja	Sri Rama Rajyam	Copper
Best Editor	M. R. Varma	Dookudu	Copper
Best Art Director	S. Ravinder	Rajanna	Copper
Best Screenplay Writer	Srinu Vaitla	Dookudu	Copper
Best Story Writer	Raj Madiraju	Rushi	Copper
Best Dialogue Writer	Neelakanta	Virodhi	Copper
Best Lyricist	Madepalli Surender	Jai Bolo Telangana	Copper
Nandi Award for Akkineni Award for best home-viewing feature film	Bunny Vasu	100% Love	Silver
Best Popular Film for Providing Wholesome Entertainment	Ram Achanta, Gopi Achanta, Anil Sunkara	Dookudu	Gold
Best Children's Film	Shikaram	Shikaram	Gold
Second Best Children's Film	Gantala Bandi	Gantala Bandi	Copper
Best Director for a Children's Film	Kenaz	Aakaasam	Copper
Best Documentary Film	Avayuva Daanam	Avayuva Daanam	Gold
Second Best Documentary Film	Mana Badhyatha	Mana Badhyatha	Silver
First best educational film			Golden
Second best educational film			Copper
Best Film Critic on Telugu Cinema	Rentala Jayadev		Copper
Sarojini Devi Award for a Film on National Integration	N. Shankar	Jai Bolo Telangana	Gold
Best Male Playback Singer	Gaddar	Jai Bolo Telangana	Copper
Best Female Playback Singer	Malavika	Rajanna	Copper
Best Child Actor	Master Nikhil	100% Love	Copper
Best Child Actress	Baby Annie	Rajanna	Copper
Best First Film of a Director	Bhanu Prakash	Prayogam	Copper
Best Choreographer	Sreenu	Sri Rama Rajyam	Copper
Best Audiographer	K. Devi Krishna	Badrinath	Copper
Best Costume Designer	Nikhil Dawan, Baasha	Anaganaga O Dheerudu	Copper
Best Makeup Artist	P. Rambabu	Sri Rama Rajyam	Copper
Best Fight Master	Vijayan	Dookudu	Copper
Best Special Effects	Phani Eggone	Anaganaga O Dheerudu	Copper
Best Male Dubbing Artist	RCM Raju	Jai Bolo Telangana	Copper
Best Female Dubbing Artist	Sunitha	Sri Rama Rajyam	Copper
Nandi Award for Best Book on Telugu Cinema (Books, posters, etc.)	Cinema Posters	Sri Eeaswar	Copper
Special Jury Award	Nagarjuna	Rajanna	Copper
Special Jury Award	Charmy Kaur	Mangala	Copper
Special Jury Award	Ramesh Prasad	Rushi	Copper

== See also ==
- Nandi Awards of 2010
