= Suddala =

Suddala (సుద్దాల) is a Telugu surname:

- Suddala Hanmanthu, is a lyrical writer.
- Suddala Ashok Teja, is a popular lyric writer in Tollywood.
