= Rajanna =

- Theatrical release poster
- Directed by: V. Vijayendra Prasad
- Written by: V. Vijayendra Prasad
- Produced by: Nagarjuna
- Starring: Nagarjuna; Sneha; Shwetha Menon; Baby Annie
- Narrated by: Akkineni Nageswara Rao
- Cinematography: Shyam K. Naidu; Anil Bandhari; Kandru Poorna
- Edited by: Kotagiri Venkateswara Rao
- Music by: M.M. Keeravani
- Production company: Annapurna Studios
- Release date: 22 December 2011
- Running time: 129 minutes
- Country: India
- Language: Telugu

Rajanna is a 2011 Indian Telugu-language period action drama film written and directed by V. Vijayendra Prasad. The film is produced by Nagarjuna, and starred him, Sneha, Shwetha Menon and child artist Baby Annie. The film is partially inspired by Razakar movement, and freedom fighter Suddala Hanmanthu. Rajanna was released to positive reviews and critical acclaim, with soundtrack composed by M. M. Keeravani. The film has won six state Nandi Awards, including the Nandi Award for Second Best Feature Film - Silver. The film was set to be released on 23 December 2011, but the date was moved ahead to 21 December due to a good response to the film's music.

It was dubbed in Hindi as Hindustani Yodha in 2012.

== Plot ==
Nelakondapalli village of Khammam district during the time of Nizam's rule on the Princely State of Hyderabad in early 1950s is under the feudal rule of an aristocratic family headed by cruel and oppressive woman addressed as "Dorasani". Mallamma, the young kid living in the village with her grandfather Sambayya has a gifted talent of singing from which her grandfather wants her to be separated for mysterious reasons. Mallamma is attached to a basil plant which is regarded as a holy one by the suppressed village's inhabitants who discreetly buried their revolutionary leader Rajanna under the plant. Sambayya desires to have Mallamma educated and takes her to Dorasani for paying educational tax where Mallamma listens to Kulkarni, a Carnatic music teacher who teaches Dorasani's uninterested and arrogant daughter. Mallamma sings upon being encouraged by the tunes enraging Dorasani, who envies her for the talent, her daughter could not acquire. Dorasani flogs Mallamma and restrains her from singing.

Kulkarni meets Mallamma, gifts her a radio for listening to songs and during a conversation with Sambayya, divulges that he knew of Mallamma being Rajanna's daughter which Sambayya concealed and adopted her when Mallamma's widowed mother Lachamma was murdered by the landlords. Kulkarni volunteers to hide the truth while Mallamma sings for the second time and is caught red-handed by Dorasani who is travelling by. Before Dorasani could capture Mallamma, Sambayya evades with her to a nearby railway station and they board a train but Mallamma gets off the train unwilling to leave her hometown. Sambayya reveals to Mallamma about her true parentage surprising her and further increasing her attachment towards the village. They are captured by Dorasani and her hooligans, who throw Mallamma in a burning hut and beat Sambayya to death. Kulkarni rescues Mallamma, has her cremate Sambayya and asks her to leave the village. She decides to go Delhi, meet the Prime minister of India Jawaharlal Nehru and request him to abolish Dorasani's rule in her village, having heard a previous conversation between the elders about it. Upon reaching Delhi after miles of journey, she falls unconscious and is sheltered by a kind Telugu woman Samakka and her husband who live by selling flowers.

Mallamma is supposed to meet Nehru on the first of next month when he meets commoners to hear their problems. However, Mallamma is overthrown by the crowd and is injured in the scuffle leaving her unable to meet Nehru. She sings in a sad mood but is heard by Shyama Shastri, a friend of Nehru and great carnatic musician who offers her a chance to sing in the competition arranged on the account of Nehru's birthday on November 14 which would be attended by him. Mallamma writes to Kulkarni about the events, continuing her stay at Sammakka's residence but the letter reaches Dorasani, who abducts Mallamma by beating Samakka and her husband, black and blue and capturing Mallamma in a room with Kulkarni as Dorasani desires to kill them after the competition ends to cruelly enjoy her desperation to attend the competition.

That night, Mallamma gets to listen about her father's story from Kulkarni. Rajanna fought against the British Raj in India and after gaining independence, the Hyderabad state's King of Nizam refused to be merged with India leaving the citizens to be oppressed under aristocratic rule. Rajanna returned to his hometown, Nelakondapalli learned about the miseries faced by the natives under suppressive landlords. He radicalized them to massacre the oppressors and sliced off the hand of a Zamindar for misbehaving with a woman named Lacchamma. When the Zamindar returned for avenge, Rajanna motivated Lacchamma to kill him herself creating a spark of revolution and bravery. The revolution spread and it was impossible to suppress the revolt, the local Zamindars consulted Razakars. Rajanna married Lacchamma and they had a daughter Mallamma. Rajanna succumbed to the revolution along with his four companions of different races united by their identity of belonging to same nation. After Rajanna's death, Lacchamma was hunted down by the Zamindars but she managed to save her daughter before dying by leaving her on a boat in the river. Sambayya took over Mallamma and raised her as his own.

At present, Mallamma escapes the shed and manages to reach the competition and though the contest ends, she receives a chance to sing her heart out and requests Nehru to free her hometown impressing him with her patriotism. Nehru drives away Dorasani and helps the town develop which later is shown to have a statue of Rajanna, garlanded by Mallamma.

== Cast ==
- Baby Annie as Mallamma, Rajanna’s daughter
- Shwetha Menon as Dorasani, the cruel landlady
- Nagarjuna as Rajanna, Mallamma's father
- Sneha as Lachamma, Rajanna's wife and Mallamma's mother
- Nassar as Kulkarni, music teacher
- Supreeth as Jagjit, Rajanna's aide
- Mukesh Rishi as Landlord
- Vijayakumar as Shyama Shastri, a carnatic musician
- Ajay as Rajanna's aide
- Pradeep Rawat as Rajanna's aide
- Ravi Kale as Dorasani's aide
- Hema as Samakka, Mallamma's namesake sister during her stay in Delhi
- Telangana Shakuntala as a bystander whom Mallamma meets
- Ajay Ghosh as Dorasani's aide
- Kalpa Latha as a villager
- Saurabh Dubey as Jawaharlal Nehru
- Sravan as Rajanna's aide
- Sanjeevi
- Gandhi
- Dinakar Gavand
- Alapathi Lakshmi
- Vaishali
- Aruna Devi
- Master Athulith

== Production ==
A massive village set and Bungalow set were erected near Jubilee Hills of Hyderabad for the film. It accidentally caught fire on 5 April 2011 causing a loss of ₹7 million. Filming resumed after 2 weeks.

=== Casting ===
It was announced in 2010 that Nagarjuna would do a film titled 'Rajanna' under Vijayendra Prasad's direction. S. S. Rajamouli choreographed the action sequences of the film. Sneha was hired to play the female lead after their previous hit Sri Ramadasu.

Malayalam actress Shwetha Menon played a negative role. Baby Annie was cast in the role of an orphaned girl.

== Soundtrack ==
The music was composed by M. M. Keeravani. Music was released on Vel Records Music Company. The audio was well received and was opened to positive reviews by critics.

== Critical acclaim ==
The reviews from the press were very positive. Rediff hailed the film as brilliant and fullhyd.com said "Mallamma's story is brilliantly written", and praised the performances as well, particularly that of Baby Annie. StudentLive gave 4/5, saying, "Rajanna is a movie made a genuine effort. It’s not a movie stuffed with brainless action. This is something rare from the stables of Tollywood which more often than not dishes movies that require you to leave your brain behind when you watch the movie. Rajanna is sure to touch your hearts." The film was later dubbed and released in Tamil as Raja Singh during 2015.

== Accolades ==
Award (Note: Awards, festivals and organizations are in alphabetical order.)	Date of ceremony (Note: Date is linked to the article about the awards held that year, wherever possible.)	Category	Recipient(s)	Result	Ref.
CineMAA Awards	17 June 2012	Jury Best Actor – Male	Nagarjuna	Won	
CineMAA Awards	17 June 2012	Special Appreciation Award	Baby Annie	Won	
Filmfare Awards South	7 July 2012	Best Film – Telugu	Rajanna – Nagarjuna	Nominated	
Filmfare Awards South	7 July 2012	Best Actor – Telugu	Nagarjuna	Nominated	
Filmfare Awards South	7 July 2012	Best Supporting Actress – Telugu	Baby Annie	Won	
Filmfare Awards South	7 July 2012	Best Music Director – Telugu	M. M. Keeravani	Nominated	
Filmfare Awards South	7 July 2012	Best Lyricist – Telugu	Suddala Ashok Teja – ("Lachuvamma Lachuvamma")	Nominated	
Nandi Awards	13 October 2012	Second Best Feature Film - Silver	Rajanna – Nagarjuna	Won	
Nandi Awards	13 October 2012	Best Character Actor	Sammeta Gandhi	Won	
Nandi Awards	13 October 2012	Best Child Actress	Baby Annie	Won	
Nandi Awards	13 October 2012	Best Art Director	S. Ravinder	Won	
Nandi Awards	13 October 2012	Best Female Playback Singer	Malavika – ("Amma Avani Nelathalli Ani")	Won	
Nandi Awards	13 October 2012	Special Jury Award	Nagarjuna	Won	
Santosham Film Awards	12 August 2012	Best Child Artist	Baby Annie	Won	
South Indian International Movie Awards	21–22 June 2012	Best Actor – Telugu	Nagarjuna	Nominated	
South Indian International Movie Awards	21–22 June 2012	Special Appreciation – Actor	Nagarjuna	Won	
South Indian International Movie Awards	21–22 June 2012	Best Supporting Actor – Telugu	Baby Annie	Nominated	
South Indian International Movie Awards	21–22 June 2012	Special Appreciation	Baby Annie	Won	
South Indian International Movie Awards	21–22 June 2012	Best Music Director – Telugu	M. M. Keeravani	Nominated	
South Indian International Movie Awards	21–22 June 2012	Best Lyricist – Telugu	K. Sivadatta – ("Gijigadu")	Nominated	
South Indian International Movie Awards	21–22 June 2012	Best Female Playback Singer – Telugu	Malavika – ("Amma Avani Nelathalli Ani")	Nominated	
TSR–TV9 National Film Awards 2011	20 April 2013	Special Jury Award – Best Film	Rajanna – Nagarjuna	Won	
TSR–TV9 National Film Awards 2011	20 April 2013	Special Jury Award – Best Actress	Sneha	Won	
TSR–TV9 National Film Awards 2011	20 April 2013	Special Jury Award – Best Child Actress	Baby Annie	Won	
