= Nandi Awards of 1978 =

Indian Telugu film and TV awards ceremony

Nandi Awards were presented annually by the Government of Andhra Pradesh. The first awards were presented in 1964.

== 1978 Nandi Awards Winners List ==
Category	Winner	Film
Best Feature Film	Eranki Sharma	Naalaaga Endaro
Second Best Feature Film	Devadas Kanakala	Chali Cheemalu
Third Best Feature Film	A. Bhimsingh	Karunamayudu
