= Gurram Yadagiri Reddy =

Indian politician

MLA and Freedom Fighter

Andhra Pradesh Legislative Assembly
- In office 1985–1999
- Preceded by: Uppunuthula Purushotham Reddy
- Succeeded by: Papaiah Kommu
- Constituency: Ramannapet

Personal details
- Born: 5 February 1931
- Died: 22 November 2019 (aged 88)
- Party: Communist Party of India
- Spouse: Yadamma
- Children: Rajashekar Reddy, Rammohan, Bharathi, Rajamani
- Parent(s): Narasamma, Ram Reddy

Gurram Yadagiri Reddy (5 February 1931 – 22 November 2019) was a freedom fighter of Telangana rebellion and a veteran politician at Communist Party of India. He was elected as a member of the Andhra Pradesh Legislative Assembly three times. He represented Ramannapeta constituency from CPI. He was a renowned freedom fighter during the Telangana peasants' armed struggle at the time of the Nizam regime. Leaders from across the political spectrum remember Reddy as a simple and honest man, “one who sent his children to government schools and never bought a car or a house,” and a “role-model Communist.” He believed and followed communist ideology and moral philosophy until his last breath.

Yadagiri Reddy died on 22 November 2019 at the age of 88, due to cardiac arrest.

== Personal life ==
Gurram Yadagiri Reddy was born in Suddala, Gundala mandal of the erstwhile Nalgonda district, present-day Yadadri bhongir, Telangana State on 15 February 1931 in an agricultural family, Narasamma and Gurram Ram Reddy were his parents. He was the fourth son in the family. He grew up in Suddala village, which was famous for communist movements.

Reddy was married to Yadamma. They had two sons, Rajashekar Reddy, an advocate, and Rammohan Reddy, a journalist, and two daughters, Bharathamma and Rajamani. Reddy's family was not into politics.

At the age of fifteen, he was attracted to communist ideology and fought against the Deshmukhs, Razakars of Nizam. He participated in guerrilla movements in his teen years. He was well known for his peasant movements in Andhra Pradesh state.

== Political career ==
Yadagiri Reddy, having gotten attracted to the communist party ideology during his school days, joined the Communist Party of India. After India attained independence in 1947, the Communist Party of India led armed struggles against a series of local monarchs that were reluctant to give up their power, particularly in Telangana, Tripura, and Kerala. Yadagiri Reddy was an active member in rebellion that took place in Telangana, against the Nizam of Hyderabad. As an active member of Communist Party of India, he led several processions on behalf of farmers from Nalgonda district on foot.

In Telangana Armed Rebellion, he worked with Suddala Hanmanthu, Dharma Bhiksham, Mallu Swarajyam and Bhimreddy Narasimha Reddy and other strong communist pioneers of those times.

He held District and state level positions at Communist Party of India. He worked as secretary of Communist Party of India, Ramannapeta Taluk, and as district president of Raithu Sangam and also as State president of Akhila Bharatha Raithu Sangam of Andhra Pradesh.

His victories in the elections are historical. Yadagiri Reddy won Ramannapet Assembly seat thrice, and in consecutive terms, in 1985, 1989 and 1994, twice against the then strong rival Vuppunuthala Purushottam Reddy, a former minister and once against Kommu Papaiah, a former minister from the Indian National Congress.
