= Her – Chapter 1 =

2023 Indian drama film

- Directed by: Sreedhar Swaraghav
- Written by: Sreedhar Swaraghav
- Produced by: Deepa Sankuratri; Raghu Sankuratri
- Starring: Ruhani Sharma; Vikas Vasishta; Jeevan Kumar
- Cinematography: Vishnu Besi
- Edited by: Chanakya Reddy Toorupu
- Music by: Pavan
- Production company: Double Up Media Private Limited
- Release date: 21 July 2023
- Running time: 103 minutes
- Country: India
- Language: Telugu

Her – Chapter 1 is a 2023 Indian Telugu-language Drama Film written and directed by Sreedhar Swaraghav. The film was produced by Deepa Sankuratri and Raghu Sankuratri under the banner of Double Up Media. It features Ruhani Sharma, Vikas Vasishta and Jeevan Kumar in lead roles. The film was released theatrically on 21 July 2023 and started streaming on Amazon Prime Video on 15 September 2023.

== Plot ==
ACP Archana Prasad is commissioned to investigate a double homicide case. The case assumes priority as it involves the rape/murder of a female victim. This seemingly random brutal crime at first soon becomes personal and stirs up her emotional past.

== Cast ==
- Ruhani Sharma as ACP Archana Prasad
- Vikas Vasishta as Seshadri
- Jeevan Kumar as Nataraj
- Abhigya Vuthaluru As Swathi
- Ravi Varma as Anil

== Production ==
The principal photography of the film started in 2022. The teaser of the film was released on 18 January 2023 in the presence of Nani.

== Reception ==
The film became an OTT hit topping the streaming charts for about 2 months on Amazon prime India..The film met with mixed to positive critical reviews. Abhilasha Cherukuri of Cinema Express awarded the film 3.5/5 stars. Srivathsan Nadadhur of OTTPlay rated the film 3/5 stars. Subhash K. Jha of Times Now gave the film 1.5/5 stars.

The film was also reviewed by Sangeetha Devi Dundoo for The Hindu.
