= Adavalle Aligithe =

- Movie Poster
- Directed by: Vejella Satyanarayana
- Written by: Ganesh Patro (dialogues)
- Screenplay by: Vejella Satyanarayana
- Story by: Nanu Chandra
- Produced by: Akkineni Srinivasa Rao; Yarramshetty Anjineeyulu
- Starring: Gummadi; Nutan Prasad; Rajendra Prasad; Ranganath; Sai Chand; Devika; Rajyalakshmi
- Cinematography: R. K. Raju
- Edited by: Akkineni Ajay Kumar
- Music by: Krishna-Chakra
- Production company: Vijaya Chitra Pictures
- Release date: 3 December 1983
- Running time: 135 mins
- Country: India
- Language: Telugu

Adavalle Aligithe (transl. If Ladies Show Sulk) is a 1983 Indian Telugu-language comedy film directed by Vejella Satyanarayana. It stars Gummadi, Nutan Prasad, Rajendra Prasad, Ranganath, Sai Chand, Devika and Rajyalakshmi, with music composed by Krishna-Chakra. This movie was remade in Kannada as Ella Hengasarindha (1986).

== Cast ==
- Gummadi as Subbarayudu
- Nutan Prasad as Ganapathi
- Rajendra Prasad as Karthik
- Ranganath as Prasad
- Sai Chand as Paaru
- Suthi Velu as Vemana
- Potti Prasad
- C.H.Krishna Murthy as Yadagiri
- Chitti Babu as Damodaram
- Devika as Venkatalakshmi
- Rajyalakshmi as Anasuya
- P. R. Varalakshmi as Rajeswari
- Veejella Rajeswari as Sharada
- Vanitha Sri as Jaya
- Kalpana Rai as Vemana's wife

== Soundtrack ==
Adavalle Aligithe

Film score
- Released: 1983
- Genre: Soundtrack
- Length: 12:37
- Label: AVM Audio
- Producer: Krishna-Chakra

Music composed by Krishna-Chakra. Lyrics were written by Dr. Nellutla. Music released on AVM Audio Company.

S. No.	Song title	Singers	length
1	"Sitamma Buggalo"	S. P. Balasubrahmanyam, P. Susheela	4:20
2	"Bhayamenduke Neeku Bharyamani"	S. P. Balasubrahmanyam, P. Susheela	4:19
3	"Thurupu Disalo"	P. Susheela	3:58

== Other ==
- VCDs and DVDs on - Moser Baer Home Videos, Hyderabad
