= Vachinde =

Single by Madhu Priya and Ramky

from the album Fidaa
- Language: Telugu
- Released: 2 June 2016
- Genre: Folk
- Length: 4:42
- Label: Aditya Music
- Composer: Shakthikanth Karthick
- Lyricist: Suddala Ashok Teja
- Producer: Shakthikanth Karthick

Fidaa track listing
- 6 tracks: 1. "Vachinde"; 2. "Edo Jarugutondi"; 3. "Hey Pillagaada"; 4. "Oosupodu"; 5. "Hey Mister"; 6. "Fidaa"

Music video
- "Vachinde" on YouTube

"Vachinde" (transl. He came) is an Indian Telugu-language song composed by Shakthikanth Karthick for the soundtrack of the 2017 romantic drama film Fidaa. The song was sung by Madhu Priya and Ramky and written by Suddala Ashok Teja.

== Production and background ==
Since the song required an authentic singer from Telangana, folk singer Madhupriya was chosen. The song is a wedding song and features Sai Pallavi in a magenta lehenga.

== Release ==
Upon release, the music video was noted for Sai Pallavi's dances and facial expressions. In September 2018, the song received 150 million views on YouTube. It January 2019, the song received 170 million views and 1.4 million likes becoming the most viewed South Indian song, a record previously held by "Why This Kolaveri Di". As of 2025, the film received more than 370 million views.

== Reception ==
A critic from Moviecrow wrote, "Vachinde is a delightful celebratory song delivered by Madhu Priya's squeaky vocals and supported by Ramky's terse verse. However, Shakthikanth Karthick props up the song with the Kishore's Sitar and Biju's harmonium serves as a wonderful rhythm which sets the mood of the song. Suddala Ashok Teja's colloquial banter lyrics gels well with the tone of the son". Karthik of Milliblog wrote, "Much of Vachinde‘s buoyancy is from Madhu Priya’s fantastic singing. Shakthikanth’s folksy backgrounds include lovely dollops of sitar and harmonium".

== Awards and nominations ==
Award	Ceremony	Category	Recipient	Result	Ref.
Filmfare Awards South	16 June 2018	Best Female Playback Singer – Telugu	Madhu Priya	Won	
Filmfare Awards South	16 June 2018	Best Choreography	Sekhar	Won (Note: Also for "Ammudu Let's Do Kummudu" from Khaidi No. 150 (2017).)	
South Indian International Movie Awards	14–15 September 2018	Best Lyricist (Telugu)	Suddala Ashok Teja	Won	
South Indian International Movie Awards	14–15 September 2018	Best Female Playback Singer (Telugu)	Madhu Priya	Won	
Zee Telugu Golden Awards	31 December 2017	Favourite Song	"Vachinde"	Nominated	
