= Nootokka Jillala Andagadu =

- Theatrical release poster
- Directed by: Rachakonda Vidyasagar
- Written by: Avasarala Srinivas
- Produced by: Sirish; Yeduguru Rajeev Reddy; Jagarlamudi Sai Babu
- Starring: Avasarala Srinivas; Ruhani Sharma
- Cinematography: Raam Reddy
- Edited by: Kiran Ganti
- Music by: Shakthikanth Karthick
- Production companies: Sri Venkateswara Creations; First Frame Entertainments
- Release date: 3 September 2021
- Country: India
- Language: Telugu

Nootokka Jillala Andagadu (transl. The handsome man of 101 districts) is a 2021 Indian Telugu-language comedy drama film directed by Rachakonda Vidyasagar. It is written by Avasarala Srinivas who stars alongside Ruhani Sharma. The film is produced by Sri Venkateswara Creations and First Frame Entertainments. Movie loosely based Ondu Motteya Kathe. The plot follows Gotti Surya Narayana (Avasarala), a 37-year old bachelor with a bald head. Principal photography of the film started in 2019 but its production and release were delayed due to the COVID-19 pandemic. It was released on 3 September 2021.

== Plot ==
An unmarried young man named Gotti Surya Narayana "GSN" manages his premature baldness by wearing a wig.

== Cast ==
- Avasarala Srinivas as Gotti Surya Narayana "GSN"
- Ruhani Sharma as Anjali
- Rohini as GSN's mother
- Krishna Bhagavaan as God
- Sivannarayana Naripeddi as Anjali's Father
- Rocket Raghava
- Abhishek Maharshi
- Siddharth Gollapudi

== Production ==
The film was officially launched in October 2019 in Hyderabad with a traditional pooja ceremony. Production began in the end of 2019 but was halted due to the COVID-19 pandemic. Shooting resumed in September 2020, following the ease of the COVID-19 lockdown in India. Avasarala plays Gotti Surya Narayana, a 37-year old bachelor who has a bald head. Ruhani Sharma plays his love interest. The makers have denied the speculations that the film was a remake of the Hindi film Bala (2019), stating it was conceived before the latter's release. The film is presented by Dil Raju and Krish Jagarlamudi.

The film's title Nootokka Jillala Andagadu is adapted from actor Nutan Prasad's catchphrase from Chali Cheemalu (1978).

== Soundtrack ==
Nootokka Jillala Andagadu

Soundtrack album by Shakthikanth Karthick
- Recorded: 2021
- Genre: Feature film soundtrack
- Length: 17:07
- Label: Mango Music
- Producer: Shakthikanth Karthick

The film has score and soundtrack composed by Shakthikanth Karthick and was released on Mango Music. The first single "Nootokka Jillala Andagadu" was released in April 2021, which featured lyrics written by Bhaskarabhatla and vocals by Simha. The soundtrack album consists of five singles.

Track-List
No.	Title	Lyrics	Singer(s)	Length
1.	"Nootokka Jillala Andagadu"	Bhaskarabhatla	Simha
2.	"Naa Girlfrienduu"	Bhaskarabhatla	Anudeep Dev
3.	"Manasa Vinava"	Bhaskarabhatla	Sreeram Chandra, Dhanya Balakrishna
4.	"Alasina Sanchari"	Sree Vishwa	Hemachandra
5.	"Nootokka Jillala Andagadu (Disco Reprise)"	Bhaskarabhatla	Prudhvi Chandra
Total length:				17:07

== Release ==
The film was initially scheduled for release on 7 May 2021. It was later pushed to 27 August, and subsequently 3 September 2021. A pre-release event was conducted on 30 August 2021.

== Reception ==
Sangeetha Devi Dundoo of The Hindu wrote that: "Nootokka… is well intentioned and handles issues with sensitivity. But it doesn’t have the spark with which Avasarala wrote Oohalu Gusagusalade and Jo Atchyutananda." Dundoo appreciated the performances of Avasarala, Sharma and Rohini, and opined that the latter was capable of making a difference in crucial scenes. The Times of India critic Sravan Vanaparthy rated the film 3/5 and wrote: "Nootokka Jillala Andagadu is a popcorn entertainer with a message to convey about body shaming."

Anji Shetty of Sakshi praised the performances of Avasarala and Sharma, and opined that humour and emotions were main drivers of the film. Shetty, however, felt that routine story and climax have let down the film. A reviewer from Eenadu also echoed the same, writing that director Vidyasagar's flat narration style could not carry the screenplay and emotion properly. Namasthe Telangana critic lauded the novel attempt by the makers but felt that screenplay was not convincing enough.

Suresh Rachamalla of News18 Telugu, on the other hand, stated that the writing, direction and performances have done justice for the film. Samayam Telugu reviewer Sekher Kusuma also wrote that the screenplay was gripping and entertaining, while also appreciating the music and choreography.
