= Fidaa =

2017 Indian film by Sekhar Kammula

- Theatrical release poster
- Directed by: Sekhar Kammula
- Written by: Sekhar Kammula
- Produced by: Dil Raju; Shirish
- Starring: Varun Tej; Sai Pallavi
- Cinematography: Vijay C. Kumar
- Edited by: Marthand K. Venkatesh
- Music by: Shakthikanth Karthick
- Production company: Sri Venkateswara Creations
- Release date: 21 July 2017
- Running time: 134 minutes
- Country: India
- Language: Telugu
- Budget: ₹13 crore
- Box office: est. ₹91 crore

Fidaa (transl. Spellbound) is a 2017 Indian Telugu-language romantic comedy drama film written and directed by Sekhar Kammula, and produced by Dil Raju under Sri Venkateswara Creations. It stars Varun Tej and Sai Pallavi (in her Telugu cinema debut). The plot follows Varun, an NRI, and Bhanu, a spirited village girl, as their budding romance faces cultural clashes and personal challenges. After parting ways, destiny reunites them, testing their love and resilience in unexpected ways.

Principal photography commenced in March 2016, and was shot in Banswada of Telangana, Texas, North Brunswick, New Jersey and Colorado. The film's soundtrack is composed by Shakthkanth Karthik, with cinematography and editing by Vijay C. Kumar and Marthand K. Venkatesh, respectively.

Released on 21 July 2017, the film received critical acclaim and emerged as a commercial blockbuster, earning over ₹91 crore on a budget of ₹13 crore. It won four Filmfare Awards from nine nominations, along with two SIIMA Awards. Film Companion listed it among the "25 Greatest Telugu Films of the Decade." It also won the Telangana State Gaddar Award for Second Best Feature Film.

== Plot ==
Varun is a non-resident Indian who lives in Austin, Texas, United States with his elder brother Raju and adopted brother Bujji. He is a medical student aiming to become a neurosurgeon. Varun comes to India along with his younger brother for Raju's marriage to Renuka, whose family hails from Banswada in Telangana. There he meets Bhanumathi, Renuka's younger sister. Bhanu is a beautiful and confident girl who doesn't want to feel secondary to anyone. Gradually Varun and Bhanu develop a liking for each other but don't express it. Bhanu loves her father very dearly and doesn't believe in leaving him after her marriage.

One day, she overhears Varun talking to his cousin Shailu about the opportunities in USA compared to India which he deems unfit for settling. Worse, his reference to a marriage between Shailu and her boyfriend is misconstrued by Bhanu as being between Varun and Shailu and so she feels cheated and misled by Varun. Heartbroken, Bhanu decides to forget Varun and suppress her feelings for him and starts to ignore him. After his brother's marriage, Varun returns to USA but can't stop thinking about his love on Bhanu and why she ignored him. He decides to confess his love to her. But Bhanumathi gives him a rude answer which enrages Varun creating a rift between them that widens further due to subsequent rude behaviors from both of them. Bhanu finally agrees to marry a man of her father's choice but realizes she isn't comfortable with him even before marriage.

Meanwhile, Renuka becomes pregnant. So, she is advised bed rest by the doctors. Bhanu is sent to USA by her father to help Renuka cope up with the pregnancy. Varun starts being inconsiderate towards Bhanu during her stay with them. This disturbs Bhanu and an argument ensues between them after which she decides to leave for India in a week. Before leaving, Bhanu decides to visit her friend in USA and Varun is asked to drop Bhanu at her friend's place. On the way when Varun drops her at a bus stop so she can take a bus, both have their final fight. Realizing that he has hurt her, Varun makes amends and confesses to Bhanu that he deeply loves her and cannot imagine his life with anyone else. He explains that his bad behavior toward her was merely a mask he used, albeit unsuccessfully, to suppress his feelings for her, and promises that, because he seeks her happiness, he will respect and value her going forward. They then decide to stay as friends and he offers to show her America.

It is during this cross-country USA roadtrip that Bhanu realizes how deep Varun's love for her is and she also rediscovers her own deep feelings for him. Before leaving for India, at the airport, Bhanu runs to Varun and hugs him with tearful eyes. Varun understands that Bhanu still loves him and a few days later goes to India to ask for her hand in marriage. Bhanu's father learns of their feelings for each other, and advises her to follow her heart and marry Varun instead of the man he chose to which she agrees. Though happy that she is marrying Varun, she is apprehensive about leaving her father and her village. After the wedding ceremony, Bhanu packs her luggage to leave for the USA. Renuka then tells her the truth that Varun actually gave up his life in the US and his medical seat and has decided to settle and practice as a Doctor in their village. Overjoyed, Bhanu runs to Varun and asks him how he could make such a big sacrifice to which he answers that wherever she is, it is his world because he loves her a lot. Varun decides to establish a hospital in the village and they live happily thereafter.

== Cast ==
- Varun Tej as Varun
- Sai Pallavi as Bhanumati "Bhanu"
- Raja Chembolu as Raju, Varun's elder brother and Renuka's husband
- Sharanya Pradeep as Renuka "Renu", Bhanumati's elder sister and Raju's wife & Varun's sister in law
- Sai Chand as Bhanumati's father
- Dhaasshyam Geetha Bhaskar as Bhanumati's aunt
- Satyam Rajesh as Ali, Varun's friend
- Aryan Talla as Bujji, Raju and Varun's younger adopted brother
- Gayathri Gupta as Sumathi, Bhanumati's friend
- Manisha Eerabathini as Shailu, Varun's cousin
- Katarina Richter as Suzie
- Harshvardhan Rane as Bhanumati's neighbor and suitor (cameo appearance)
- Sri Gouri Priya as Bhanumati's co-passenger on the train

== Soundtrack ==
Fidaa

Soundtrack album by Shakthikanth Karthick
- Released: 28 March 2016
- Recorded: 2016
- Genre: Feature film soundtrack
- Length: 27:59
- Label: Aditya Music
- Producer: Shakthikanth Karthick

Shakthikanth Karthick chronology
Ko Antey Koti (2012)	Fidaa (2016)	Nela Ticket (2018)

The film's music is scored by music director Shakthikanth Karthick and was released on Aditya Music.

The song "Hey Pillagaada" is inspired by an older song "Parugulu Theeyaali" from the movie Malliswari (1951).

Track-List
No.	Title	Lyrics	Singer(s)	Length
1.	"Vachinde"	Suddala Ashok Teja	Madhu Priya, Ramky	5:22
2.	"Edo Jarugutondi"	Sirivennela Seetharama Sastry	Aravind Srinivas, Renuka	5:04
3.	"Hey Pillagaada"	Vanamali	Sindhuri, Sinov Raj	4:08
4.	"Oosupodu"	Chaitanya Pingali	Hemachandra	4:33
5.	"Hey Mister"	Vanamali	Deepak	3:31
6.	"Fidaa"	Chaitanya Pingali	Hemachandra, Malavika	5:21
Total length:				27:59

== Release ==
=== Theatrical release ===
The production of Fidaa began in August 2016 and the film was released worldwide on July 21, 2017. It was made on a budget of 13 crores and ended up grossing ₹91 crores, with a distributor share of ₹48 crore. It was the seventh highest-grossing Telugu film of that year. It is dubbed into Malayalam and Hindi under the same title, and in Tamil as Banumathi.

=== Home media ===
The film premiered on television in Star Maa channel on September 24, 2017, and received a massive 21.3 TRP just behind Bahubali and Magadheera. Fidda made its debut on Aha on 8 July 2021 after being acquired by the platform.

== Critical reception ==
The Hindu critic Sangeetha Devi opined that the film was rooted in reality. "Director Sekhar Kammula returns with a heart-warming romantic musical, powered by compelling characters," she added. A reviewer from The Times of India rated the film three stars and wrote, "The plot line is too flimsy and simplistic; the climax is also a la Anand"

In his review for the Firstpost, Hemanth Kumar CR rated it 3.25 out of five, and stated, "The film is packed with relatable characters, a lead pair whose sparkling chemistry is bound to put a smile on your face, and a landscape which takes your breath away just by its sheer beauty and simplicity." Kumar however felt that the climax was rushed and the story itself needed better closure. Karthik Keramulu writing for The News Minute appreciated the lead cast performances by stating, "While Sai Palavi steals the show, Varun Tej plays the shy boy to perfection." The Indian Express critic Priyanka Sundar rated the film 3 stars of 5, and wrote: "Sekhar Kammula directorial Fidaa has done something unexpected yet again with this film which is to tell a story from the female perspective." She, however, added that the film falls short due to lack of strong supporting cast roles.

== Impact ==
Fidaa is listed among the "25 Greatest Telugu Films Of The Decade" by Film Companion. Additionally, Film Companion also listed Sai Pallavi's performance in the film amongst "100 Greatest Performances of the Decade".

== Awards and nominations ==
Award	Ceremony	Category	Recipient	Result	Ref.
Filmfare Awards South	16 June 2018	Best Actress – Telugu	Sai Pallavi	Won	
Filmfare Awards South	16 June 2018	Best Male Playback Singer – Telugu	Hemachandra for "Oosupodhu"	Won	
Filmfare Awards South	16 June 2018	Best Female Playback Singer – Telugu	Madhu Priya for "Vachinde"	Won	
Filmfare Awards South	16 June 2018	Best Choreography	Sekhar for "Vachinde"	Won (Note: Also for "Ammudu Let's Do Kummudu" from Khaidi No. 150 (2017).)	
Filmfare Awards South	16 June 2018	Best Film – Telugu	Dil Raju	Nominated	
Filmfare Awards South	16 June 2018	Best Director – Telugu	Sekhar Kammula	Nominated	
Filmfare Awards South	16 June 2018	Best Supporting Actress – Telugu	Sharanya Pradeep	Nominated	
Filmfare Awards South	16 June 2018	Best Music Director – Telugu	Shakthikanth Karthick & Akash Reddy	Nominated	
Filmfare Awards South	16 June 2018	Best Lyricist – Telugu	Chaitanya Pingali for "Oosupodhu"	Nominated	
South Indian International Movie Awards	14–15 September 2018	Best Film (Telugu)	Dil Raju	Nominated	
South Indian International Movie Awards	14–15 September 2018	Best Actress (Telugu)	Sai Pallavi	Nominated	
South Indian International Movie Awards	14–15 September 2018	Best Lyricist (Telugu)	Suddala Ashok Teja for "Vachinde"	Won	
South Indian International Movie Awards	14–15 September 2018	Best Female Playback Singer (Telugu)	Madhu Priya for "Vachinde"	Won	
South Indian International Movie Awards	14–15 September 2018	Best Male Playback Singer (Telugu)	Hemachandra for "Oosupodhu"	Nominated	
South Indian International Movie Awards	14–15 September 2018	Best Music Director (Telugu)	Shakthikanth Karthick & Akash Reddy	Nominated	
Zee Telugu Golden Awards	31 December 2017	Best Director	Sekhar Kammula	Won	
Zee Telugu Golden Awards	31 December 2017	Favourite Director	Sekhar Kammula	Nominated	
Zee Telugu Golden Awards	31 December 2017	Entertainer Of The Year (Male)	Varun Tej	Nominated	
Zee Telugu Golden Awards	31 December 2017	Entertainer Of The Year (Female)	Sai Pallavi	Nominated	
Zee Telugu Golden Awards	31 December 2017	Favourite Music Director	Shakthikanth Karthick & Akash Reddy	Nominated	
Zee Telugu Golden Awards	31 December 2017	Favourite Song	"Vachinde"	Nominated	
Zee Telugu Golden Awards	31 December 2017	Favourite Film	Dil Raju	Nominated	
