= Veerabhadruni Rahasyam =

2026 Telugu-language mystery thriller series

- Telugu: వీరభద్రుని రహస్యం
- Genre: Mystery; Thriller; Drama
- Written by: Rudarraju Chanakya Varma
- Directed by: Bheemagani Sri Vardhan Reddy
- Starring: Annie; Raghu Kunche; Raghu; SI Ravi; Kamal Thumu; Sireesha; Anuradha
- Composer: Sudha Srinivas
- Country of origin: India
- No. of episodes: 60

Production
- Cinematography: Subhash

Original release
- Network: ZEE5
- Release: 3 July 2026

Veerabhadruni Rahasyam is a 2026 Indian Telugu-language mystery thriller web series directed by Bheemagani Sri Vardhan Reddy. It is presented as a follow-up to Marmadesam, a Tamil television mystery series of the 1990s. The series stars Annie as a woman who investigates a string of deaths in a village that its residents attribute to divine punishment. Announced for a 26 June 2026 premiere, the series was delayed and began streaming on ZEE5 on 3 July 2026.

== Premise ==
Set in the village of Veerabhadrapuram, where residents attribute a series of deaths near the local temple to punishment by the deity Veerabhadra. Vennela a woman from the city, rejects the idea that the deaths are supernatural and begins her own investigation, uncovering secrets that people in the village want to keep hidden.

== Cast ==
- Annie as Dr. Vennela
- Raghu as Karthikeya, Yoganandam's only son
  - Harvin Reddy as young Karthikeya
- Kamal Thumu as Dr. Nanda
- Abhinav as SI Ravi
- Ghanta Mounika as Dr. Kalpana, Yoganandam's elder daughter, Vennela's best friend and Ravi's love interest.
- Raghu Kunche as Yoganandam
- Sireesha as Simhavalli, Yoganandam's wife
- Balachandra as Gurunadham, Yoganandham's spoilt younger brother
- Kalki as Brahmam, Yoganandam's brother in law and rival an ex bandit.
- Tanuja Madhurapanthula as Vasantha
- Sammeta Gandhi as Parandhamayya, Vasantha's father
- Chatrapati Shekar as Sebastian alias Ramaswamy alias Sathibabu; Vennela's father
- Bindu Chandramouli as Sujatha, Vennela's mother, Ramaswamy's wife.

== Production ==
Veerabhadruni Rahasyam was directed by Bheemagani Sri Vardhan Reddy and produced as a Telugu ZEE5 Original. It is framed by the platform as a continuation of the world of Marmadesam, a Tamil mystery television series from the 1990s.
