= Ek Niranjan =

2009 Indian film by Puri Jagannadh

- A film poster of Ek Niranjan
- Directed by: Puri Jagannadh
- Written by: Puri Jagannadh
- Produced by: Aditya Ram
- Starring: Prabhas; Kangana Ranaut; Sonu Sood; Mukul Dev
- Cinematography: Shyam K. Naidu
- Edited by: M. R. Varma
- Music by: Mani Sharma
- Production company: Adityaram Movies
- Distributed by: Adityaram Movies
- Release date: 29 October 2009
- Running time: 155 minutes
- Country: India
- Language: Telugu

Ek Niranjan (transl. A Loner) is a 2009 Indian Telugu-language action comedy film directed by Puri Jagannadh and produced by Adityaram Movies. The film stars Prabhas in the lead role, alongside Kangana Ranaut, Sonu Sood and Mukul Dev.

Filming took place from March 2009 to September 2009 and was shot on Hyderabad and Bangkok in addition to two songs in Switzerland.

Ek Niranjan was released on 30 October 2009 to mixed reviews from critics and emerged as a commercial failure at the box office, collecting a distributor's share of ₹10 crore.

Prabhas was nominated for the Filmfare Award for Best Actor – Telugu for his performance in the film.

== Plot ==
Chotu works as a bounty hunter and engages in capturing gangsters for money from the cops. Chotu is also searching for his parents as he was kidnapped by Chidambaram, a gangster and leader of a child-begging racket. While capturing a goon, Chotu comes across Sameera, a guitar teacher and the sister of a goon, Manoj, working for the gangster, Johnny Bhai. The cops ask Chotu to nab Sameera's brother as he is wanted for various crimes. Chotu enters at Sameera's house and forcefully arrests his brother after causing much havoc in the house.

Chotu falls in love with Sameera, who later reciprocates her love for Chotu. Veeraiah's elder son Kailash works for Johnny Bhai, who will be arrested on charges of killing a minister Narendra Kumar, which was actually planned by Johnny Bhai. Johnny Bhai wants to kill Kailash, who is arrested, fearing that he will reveal his name to the cops. Kailash escapes from the police and Johnny Bhai goes in search of him. The city commissioner asks Chotu to find Kailash in exchange for money.

Sameera's brother vacates his house and escapes to Bangkok, fearing Johnny Bhai. Chotu also goes to Bangkok in search of Sameera and catches Kailash, who tells him that Narendra Kumar was killed by his own brother and that Kailash took the blame. Johnny Bhai kidnaps Sameera and her brother and threatens to kill them if Chotu does not hand over Kailash to him. Later, Chotu rescues Sameera from Johnny Bhai and finally reunites with his parents.

== Cast ==
- Prabhas as Niranjan aka Chotu
- Kangana Ranaut as Sameera
- Sonu Sood as Johnny Bhai
- Mukul Dev as Kailash
- Ashish Vidyarthi
- Makrand Deshpande as Chidambaram
- Sravan as Manoj, Sameera's elder brother and Johnny's henchman
- Brahmanandam as Guru
- Ali as Mantra
- Sunil as Chanti Babu
- Venu Madhav as Chitti
- Chalapathi Rao as Police Commissioner
- Posani Krishna Murali as Minister Narendra Kumar
- Brahmaji as Brahmaji
- Satya Prakash as Police Inspector
- Gautam Raju as Police Constable S Bazi Rao
- Tanikella Bharani as Veeraiah
- Sangeeta as Veeraiah's wife
- Prudhviraj as ex-Minister
- Abinayasri as Guru's wife
- Bharath Raju as Suri
- Baby Annie as Sameera's guitar student
- Akash Puri as Sameera's guitar student
- Jr Relangi as Guruji's assistant

== Soundtrack ==
Ek Niranjan

Soundtrack album by Mani Sharma
- Released: 25 September 2009
- Recorded: 2009
- Genre: Feature film soundtrack
- Length: 27:53
- Label: Aditya Music
- Producer: Mani Sharma

Mani Sharma chronology
Mitrudu (2009)	Ek Niranjan (2009)	Rechipo (2009)

The music is composed by Mani Sharma. The soundtrack contains six songs and featured throughout the film. The audio release was held on 25 September and was an elaborate event. Prabhas, Kangana Ranaut, Allu Arjun, Puri Jagannadh presented the music at the event.

Track-List
No.	Title	Lyrics	Singer(s)	Length
1.	"Ek Niranjan" (Picturised on Prabhas)	Ramajogayya Sastry	Ranjith	4:59
2.	"Gundello" (Picturised on Prabhas and Kangana Ranaut which was shot in Switzerland)	Ramajogayya Sastry	Hemachandra, Geetha Madhuri, Suchitra	4:02
3.	"Sameera" (Picturised on Prabhas and Kangana Ranaut shot in Lahari Resorts)	Ramajogayya Sastry	Karthik	5:02
4.	"Evaru Lerani" (Picturised on Prabhas and Kangana Ranaut)	Bhaskarabhatla	Malavika	4:29
5.	"Mahamari" (Picturised on Prabhas and Kangana Ranaut)	Bhaskarabhatla	Geetha Madhuri, Kalyan Vasanth	4:37
6.	"Nartanatara" (A tribute to Michael Jackson)	Viswa	Ranjith, Nilayini	4:44
Total length:				27:53

== Production ==
=== Development ===
The film was described as a commercial romantic entertainer to appeal to the audiences.

=== Filming ===
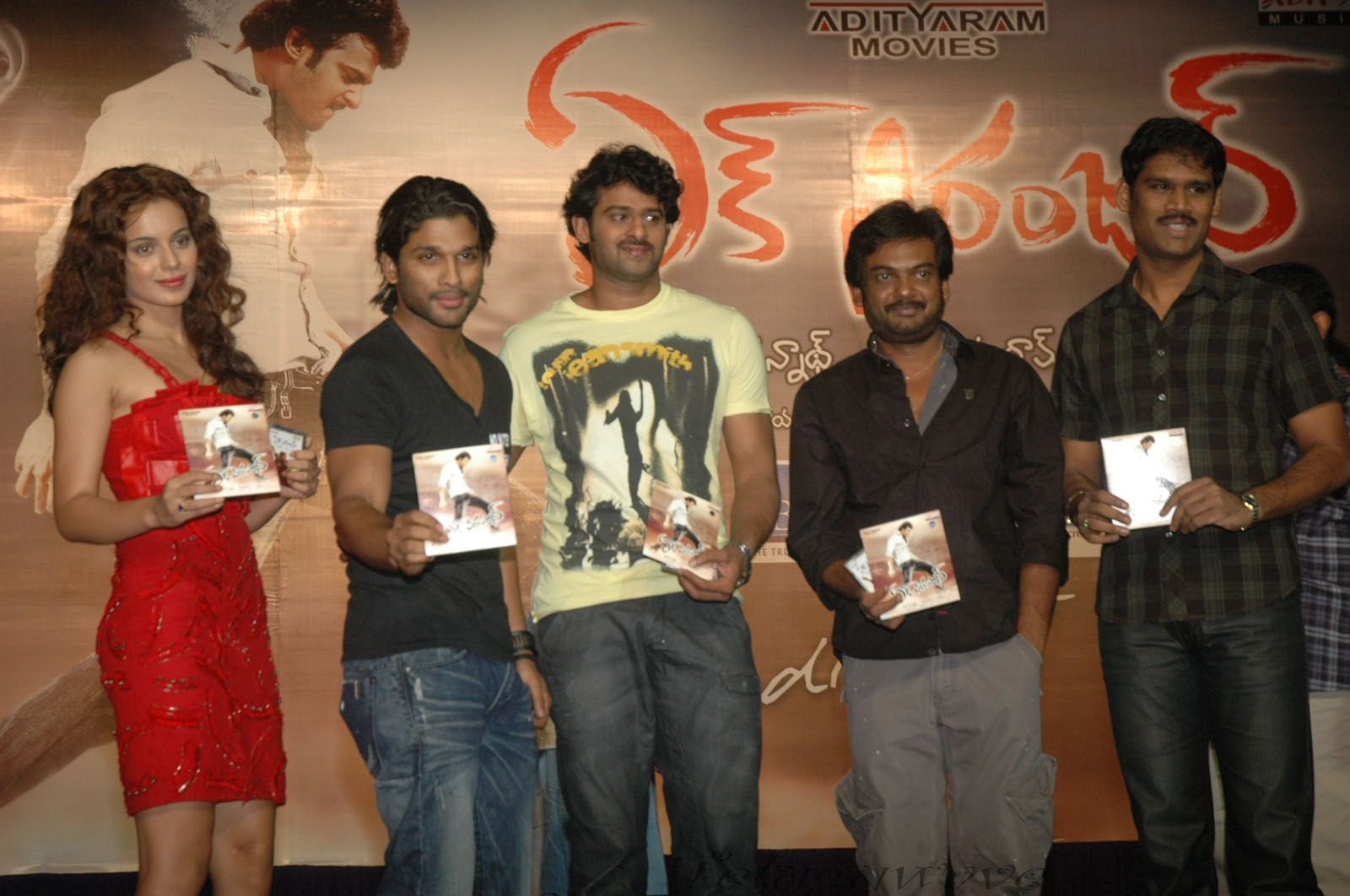
(from left) Kangana Ranaut, Allu Arjun, Prabhas, Puri Jagannadh, and Aditya Ram during the film's audio release

Ek Niranjan began shooting on 31 March 2009 in Lahari resorts and Hyderabad. Parts of the film were shot in Switzerland, Bangkok, and Pattaya. The filming was completed in September 2009.

== Release ==
=== Reception ===
The film received mixed reviews. Rediff gave a two-star rating commented "the film does not live up to the expectations. Technically, Puri ensures that the film is in place. He tries to earnestly build up a deft screenplay with a wafer-thin story (which is increasingly becoming his trademark). But the clichéd plot falls flat despite all the technical gimmicks (fights and all) and attempts to prop it up. However Prabhas is effortless as Chotu, he acts well and the movie is watchable for him although he has developed a similar style in all his films. Kangana's Telugu debut can't be really raved about. She looks pretty but as far as performance goes, there's nothing much to write about as the script doesn't have anything for her to showcase her acting skills". Sify gave a three-star rating and said "Prabhas has come up with a good and lively performance in the film. He has improved a lot in his dialogue delivery. He also excelled in dance sequences. Bollywood beauty Kangana Ranaut makes her debut in Tollywood with this film and she is looking gorgeous. Sonu Sood comes up with another dazzling performance after magnum opus Arundathi. Director Puri Jagannadh just played routine stuff in this film. The presentation and narration are very weak, lacking all seriousness. The dialogues are to some extent good. The screenplay was not impressive and there a lot many illogical threads. local review sites Greatandhra gave two and a half rating and Idlebrain gave a three-star says "On a whole, Ek Niranjan is a not a bad film. The first half of the movie is entertaining and the second half should have been better".

== Awards ==
57th Filmfare Awards South

- Nominated – Filmfare Award for Best Actor – Telugu – Prabhas
