= Filmfare Award for Best Female Playback Singer – Telugu =

Indian annual film award

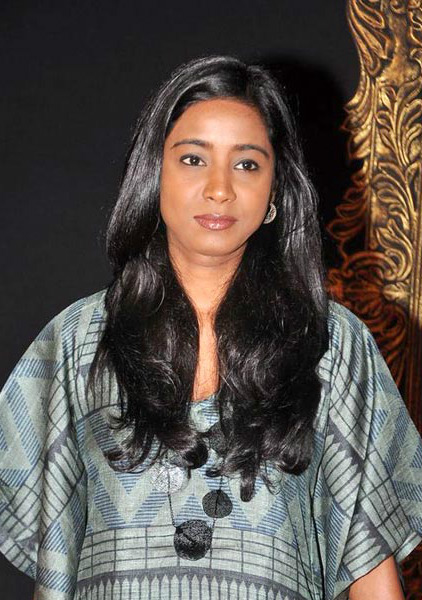
- The 2024 recipient: Shilpa Rao
- Awarded for: Best work by a female playback singer in Telugu films
- Country: India
- Presented by: Filmfare
- First award: K. S. Chitra for "Nuvvostanante" from Varsham (2004)
- Currently held by: Shilpa Rao for "Chuttamalle" from Devara: Part 1 (2024)

Highlights
- Most awards: K. S. Chitra (3)
- Most nominations: Shreya Ghoshal (10)

The Filmfare Award for Best Female Playback Singer – Telugu is given by the Filmfare magazine as part of its annual Filmfare Awards South for Telugu films. The first award in Telugu was given in 2004. During the period of 1997–2004, a common award was given irrespective of the gender of singers across all the four language-industries. K. S. Chithra is the first recipient and also holds the record for maximum number of wins.

== Winners ==
Year	Singer	Film	Song	Ref.
2024	Shilpa Rao	Devara: Part 1	"Chuttamalle"	
2023	Shweta Mohan	Sir	"Mastaaru Mastaaru"	
2022	Chinmayi	Sita Ramam	"Oh Prema"	
2020 / 21	Indravathi Chauhan	Pushpa: The Rise	"Oo Antava Oo Oo Antava"	
2019	AWARDS FUNCTION WAS SUSPENDED DUE TO COVID-19 PANDEMIC			
2018	Shreya Ghoshal	Bhaagamathie	"Mandaara Mandaara"	
2017	Madhu Priya	Fidaa	"Vachinde"	
2016	K. S. Chithra	Nenu Sailaja	"Ee Premaki"	
2015	Geetha Madhuri	Baahubali: The Beginning	"Jeevanadhi"	
2014	Sunitha	Oohalu Gusagusalade	"Em Sandehamledu"	
2013	K. S. Chithra	Seethamma Vakitlo Sirimalle Chettu	"Seethamma Vakitlo"	
2012	Suchitra	Businessman	"Sir Osthara"	
2011	Shreya Ghoshal	Sri Rama Rajyam	"Jagadhananda Karaka"	
2010	Geetha Madhuri	Golimaar	"Magallu"	
2009	Priya Himesh	Arya 2	"Ringa Ringa"	
2008	Shweta Pandit	Kotha Bangaru Lokam	"Nenani Neevani"	
2007	Sadhana Sargam	Munna	"Manasa"	
2006	Mamta Mohandas	Rakhi	"Rakhi Rakhi"	
2005	Smita	Anukokunda Oka Roju	"Evaraina"	
2004	K. S. Chithra	Varsham	"Nuvvostanante"	

== Nominations ==
=== 2000s ===
2005: Smita – "Evaraina" – Anukokunda Oka Roju

- K. S. Chithra – "Manasa Manasa" – Nireekshana
- Kavita Krishnamurthy – "Pilichina" – Athadu
- Malathy – "Jabilammavo" – Bunny
- Shreya Ghoshal – "Pillagali Allari" – Athadu
- Shreya Ghoshal – "Neeke Nuvvu" – Modati Cinema

2006: Mamta Mohandas – "Rakhi Rakhi" – Rakhi

- Gopika Poornima – "Bommanu Geesthe" – Bommarillu
- K. S. Chithra – "Manasa Vaacha" – Godavari
- K. S. Chithra – "Muvvala Navvakala" – Pournami

2008: Shweta Pandit – "Nenani Neevani" – Kotha Bangaru Lokam

- Geetha Madhuri – "Ninne Ninne" – Nachavule
- Sadhana Sargam – "Ninnenaa Nenu" – Salute
- Shreya Ghoshal – "Merupulaa" – Chintakayala Ravi
- Sunitha – "Vayassunamee" – Kantri

2009: Priya Himesh – "Ringa Ringa" – Arya 2

- Amruthavarshini – "Meghama" – Prayanam
- Nikitha Nigam – "Dheera Dheera" – Magadheera
- Sunidhi Chauhan – "Saradaga" – Oy!
- Sunitha – "Neela Neela Mabbulu" – Pravarakhyudu

=== 2010s ===
2010: Geetha Madhuri – "Magallu" – Golimaar

- Kousalya – "Bangaru Konda" – Simha
- Suchitra – "Nijamena" – Brindavanam
- Sunitha Sarathy – "Hey CM" – Leader
- Sunitha – "Egiripothe" – Vedam

2011: Shreya Ghoshal – "Jagadhananda Karaka" – Sri Rama Rajyam

- Neha Bhasin – "Hello Hello" – Dhada
- Nithya Menen – "Ammammo Ammo" – Ala Modalaindi
- Ramya – "Poovai Poovai" – Dookudu
- Swathi Reddy – "A Square B Square" – 100% Love

2012: Suchitra – "Saar Osthara" – Businessman

- Gopika Poornima – "Laali Laali" – Damarukam
- Shreya Ghoshal – "Sai Andri Nanu" – Krishnam Vande Jagadgurum
- Shweta Pandit – "Amara Rama" – Shirdi Sai
- Sunidhi Chauhan – "Atu Itu" – Yeto Vellipoyindhi Manasu

2013: K. S. Chithra – "Seethamma Vakitlo" – Seethamma Vakitlo Sirimalle Chettu

- Chinnaponnu – "Mirchi" – Mirchi
- Geetha Madhuri – "Vechhani Vayasu" – Gundello Godari
- Indu Nagaraj – "Pyar Mein Padipoya" – Potugadu
- Shreya Ghoshal – "Hey Nayak" – Naayak

2014: Sunitha – "Yem Sandeham Ledu" – Oohalu Gusagusalade

- Chinmayi – "Ra Rakumara" – Govindudu Andarivadele
- Neha Bhasin – "Aww Tujho Moh" – 1: Nenokkadine
- Shreya Ghoshal – "Chinni Chinni Aasalu" – Manam
- Shruti Haasan – "Junction Lo" – Aagadu

2015: Geetha Madhuri – "Jeevanadhi" – Baahubali: The Beginning

- Aishwarya and K. S. Chithra – "Marhaba" – Malli Malli Idi Rani Roju
- Jonita Gandhi – "Ye Katha" – Kerintha
- Mohana Bhogaraju – "Size Sexy" – Size Zero
- Shreya Ghoshal – "Nijamenani" – Kanche

2016: K. S. Chithra – "Ee Premaki" – Nenu Sailaja

- Amritavarshini KC – "Chinuku Taake" – Pelli Choopulu
- Chinmayi – "Oye Meghamala" – Majnu
- Padmalatha & Vishnupriya – "Pareshaanu Raa" – Dhruva
- Ramya Behara & Anjana Sowmya – "Naidorintikada" – Brahmotsavam

2017: Madhu Priya – "Vachinde" – Fidaa

- Geetha Madhuri and M. M. Manasi – "Mahanubhavudu" – Mahanubhavudu
- Neha Bhasin – "Swing Zara" – Jai Lava Kusa
- Sameera Bharadwaj – "Madhurame" – Arjun Reddy
- Sonu and Deepu – "Hamsa Naava" – Baahubali 2: The Conclusion

2018: Shreya Ghoshal – "Mandaraa Mandaraa" – Bhaagamathie

- Ananya Bhat – "Yettagayya Shiva Shiva" – Aatagadharaa Siva
- Chinmayi – "Yenti Yenti" – Geetha Govindam
- M. M. Manasi – "Rangamma Mangamma" – Rangasthalam
- Mohana Bhogaraju – "Reddamma Thalli" – Aravinda Sametha Veera Raghava
- Ramya Behara – "Gelupu Leni Samaram" – Mahanati

=== 2020s ===
2020–2021: Indravathi Chauhan – "Oo Antava Oo Oo Antava" – Pushpa: The Rise

- Aditi Bhavaraju – "Baavochhadu" – Palasa 1978
- Chinmayi – "Manasulone Nilichipoke" – Varudu Kaavalenu
- Madhu Priya – "He's So Cute" – Sarileru Neekevvaru
- Ramya Behara – "Korameesam Polisoda" – Krack
- Sinduri – "Chenguna Chenguna" – Varudu Kaavalenu

2022: Chinmayi – "Oh Prema" – Sita Ramam

- Divya Malika – "Kolu Kolu" – Virata Parvam
- Haripriya – "Ee Veduka" – Ashoka Vanamlo Arjuna Kalyanam
- Jonita Gandhi – "Ento Enteynto" – Thank You
- K. S. Chithra – "Antha Ishtam" – Bheemla Nayak
- Prakruthi Reddy – "Komma Uyyala" – RRR

2023: Shweta Mohan – "Mastaaru Mastaaru" – Sir

- Chinmayi – "Aradhya" – Kushi
- Chinmayi – "Odiyamma" – Hi Nanna
- Dhee – "Chamkeela Angeelesi" – Dasara
- Mangli – "Ooru Palletooru" – Balagam
- Shakthisree Gopalan – "Ammaadi" – Hi Nanna

2024: Shilpa Rao – "Chuttamalle" from Devara: Part 1

- Mangli – "Gulledu Gulledu" from Mechanic Rocky
- Shreya Ghoshal – "Sooseki" from Pushpa 2: The Rule
- Usha Uthup – "Title Track" from Lucky Baskhar

== Superlatives ==
Superlative	Artist	Record
Most awards	K. S. Chithra	3
Most nominations	Shreya Ghoshal	10
Most consecutive nominations	Shreya Ghoshal	5 (2012–2016)
Youngest winner	Madhu Priya	20 years
Oldest winner	K. S. Chithra	53 years

== See also ==
- List of media awards honoring women
- Telugu cinema
