= Ruhani Sharma =

Indian actress

- Born: 18 September 1994 (age 32); Solan, Himachal Pradesh, India
- Occupation: Actress, model
- Years active: 2013–present

Ruhani Sharma is an Indian actress and model who primarily works in Telugu films. She made her acting debut in with the Tamil film Kadaisi Bench Karthi (2017) and received praise for her lead role in Chi La Sow (2018), marking her Telugu debut. Sharma then appeared in films like HIT: The First Case (2020) and Nootokka Jillala Andagadu (2021). In 2019, she made her Malayalam debut with Kamala. She has also appeared in Punjabi music videos.

== Early life ==
Ruhani Sharma was born and brought up in Solan, Himachal Pradesh in a Himachali family. She graduated from Panjab University, Chandigarh.

== Career ==
Sharma first appeared in Punjabi music videos "Theka by Ammy bass""classroom" and "Kudi Tu Pataka" in 2013. In 2018 she made her Telugu cinema debut in Chi La Sow, directed by Rahul Ravindran, and her performance was well received and praised. In 2019 she made her Malayalam debut in the thriller film Kamala written and directed by Ranjith Sankar.

She then appeared in Telugu films HIT: The First Case and Dirty Hari in 2020 and Nootokka Jillala Andagadu in 2021.

She next appeared in the Telugu anthology film Meet Cute and made her Hindi debut in 2023 film, Agra.

== Filmography ==
=== Films ===
Key
†	Denotes films that have not yet been released

Year	Title	Role	Language	Notes	Ref.
2017	Kadaisi Bench Karthi	Nithya	Tamil		
2018	Chi La Sow	Anjali	Telugu		
2019	Kamala	Kamala / Nidhi Agasthy	Malayalam		
2020	HIT: The First Case	Neha	Telugu		
2020	Dirty Hari	Vasudha	Telugu		
2021	Nootokka Jillala Andagadu	Anjali	Telugu		
2023	Her - Chapter 1	ACP Archana Prasad	Telugu		
2023	Agra	Mala	Hindi		
2024	Saindhav	Dr. Renu	Telugu		
2024	Operation Valentine	Tanya "Hammer" Sharma	Telugu; Hindi	Bilingual film	
2024	Sriranga Neethulu	Aishwarya	Telugu		
2024	Love Me	Pallavi	Telugu	Cameo appearance	
2024	Blackout	Roshni D'Souza	Hindi		
2025	Mask	Radhi	Tamil		
2026	Aakasamlo Oka Tara	Bijili	Telugu		

=== Television ===
Year	Title	Role	Network	Language	Notes	Ref.
2019	Poison	Jhanvi	ZEE5	Hindi		
2022	Meet Cute	Saroja	SonyLIV	Telugu	Segment: "Old Is Gold"	

=== Music videos ===
Year	Title	Singer(s)	Ref.
2013	"Karva Chauth"	Jinda Balagan	
2013	"Kudi Tu Pataka"	Ammy Virk, Babbal Rai, Ranjit Bawa, Harrdy Sandhu, A-Kay, Prabh Gill	
2014	"Patiale Wal Nu"	Yeeshu Arora	
2014	"College Wali Yaari"	Jot Aulakh	
2014	"Jazbaat – The Feeling"	Lovepreet Mavi	
2014	"Ucchian Udarian"	Dil Dhanju	
2014	"Guddi"	Deep Kanvr	
2014	"Big Fan"	Harinder Buttar	
2015	"Sohniye"	Mani Thind	
2015	"Pyar (Main Ki Kra)"	Sonu Mahi	
2015	"Daftar"	L-Winder Sandhe	
2015	"Mulakatan"	Raj A.K.S.	
2015	"Billo"	Jey Bee Rapper	
2015	"Dengue vs Pendu"	Manpreet Gill	
2015	"Kudi Simple"	Inder Atwal	
2017	"Pyar"	Upkar Sandhu	
2018	"Laal Bindi"	Akull	
2018	"Tere Binn"	Shael Oswal	
2020	"Hypnotize"	Ishaan Khan	
2021	"Tu Milta Hai Mujhe"	Raj Burman & Rashid Khan	
2022	Tera Mera Pyar 2.0	Yasser Desai, Josh Sahunta	
