= Maa Bhoomi =

- Poster
- Directed by: Goutam Ghose
- Screenplay by: B. Narsing Rao; Goutam Ghose
- Dialogue by: Partho Banerjee Praan Rao
- Based on: Jab Khet Jage by Krishan Chander
- Produced by: B. Narsing Rao; G. Ravindranath
- Starring: Sai Chand; Rami Reddy; Telangana Shakuntala
- Narrated by: Jaggayya
- Cinematography: Kamal Naik
- Edited by: D. Raja Gopal
- Music by: Vinjamuri Seetha Devi; Goutam Ghose
- Production company: Saradhi Studios
- Distributed by: Chaithanya Chithra International
- Release date: 23 March 1979
- Running time: 158 minutes
- Country: India
- Language: Telugu

Maa Bhoomi (transl. Our land) is a 1979 Indian Telugu-language social problem film directed by Goutam Ghose in his debut. The film is produced by B. Narsing Rao, who also wrote the film with Goutam Ghose. The film is based on the novel Jab Khet Jage by Krishan Chander on the Telangana Rebellion in Hyderabad State. It depicts a typical life of villagers under Nizam Muslim ruling feudalistic society in the Telangana region. The film features Sai Chand, Rami Reddy and Telangana Shakuntala in pivotal roles. The plot follows Ramayya, a landless peasant who joins the Telangana Rebellion of 1948.

Released on 23 March 1979, the film was a commercial success and had a theatrical run of over a year. Maa Bhoomi was India's official entry in the "Opera Primo" section at the Karlovy Vary International Film Festival of June–July 1980, and the Cork Film Festival, October 1980, the Cairo and Sydney Film Festivals 1980. The film was showcased at the Indian Panorama of the 7th International Film Festival of India. Maa Bhoomi won the state Nandi Award for Best Feature Film, and the Filmfare Best Film Award (Telugu). It is featured among CNN-IBN's list of "hundred greatest Indian films of all time".

== Plot ==
The film follows the story of a young landless Telangana peasant named Ramayya (Sai Chand) from Siripuram, Nalgonda, a region under foreign rule. The British have appointed the Nizam as the region's governor. The Nizam, in turn, has appointed the Reddys and the Patils as the Zamindars (known locally as Doras) of the region who collect taxes among various other things for the Nizam. Further, the Nizam has granted them with titles, Jagirs and judicial rights enabling them to seize thousands of acres of land from the peasants, turning them into tenants.

Ramayya's newly married friend Ramulu is aghast when his wife is taken by the Dora's men and raped. Ramayya falls in love with a Lambadi girl. When he finds out that she also has to service the Dora sexually, he gets upset and leaves the village. He later repents his anger at her. Ramayya then moves to Suryapet where he works with a seth. The seth's wife attempts to molest him in secrecy. When he rejects her advances, she accuses him of theft. He leaves Suryapet and ends up in Hyderabad where he works as a rickshaw puller.

In Hyderabad, while pulling the rickshaw one day, he coughs a lot. The passenger asks him to stop and walks along with him the rest of the way. He asks Ramayya to get his cough checked. He also advices him to join a union. Ramayya is told to stop rickshaw pulling by a doctor and is asked to find other temporary work. Ramayya joins a factory as a labourer. One day his coworker comes and tells him that there is a speech being given at the gate and asks him to attend. He attends the speech which calls for a strike and unionizing. He recognizes the speaker as the same passenger and goes up to speak to him. Ramayya slowly becomes a part of the union and with the encouragement of his mentor educates himself.

Ramayya eventually moves back to his village and joins the movement against the landlords. The peasants formed various paramilitary groups and launch guerilla warfare attacks across the region with country-made weapons. They raid and take over regional Dora bases across rural Telangana at night and burn all the land documents found in the bases in the open yard symbolising their triumph. Eventually, they take over the village after the Indian Independence and then they distribute land among themselves which were captured from the doras.

The Doras manage to escape to Hyderabad reporting the events to the Nizam leadership. The Nizam commands the Razakars, a private Islamist militia, which perpetrates a massacre of the Telangana peasants. After months of burning, looting, rapes and killings, the Indian army marches into Hyderabad and suppresses the Razakars and the Nizam with Operation Polo in September 1948 and annexes the Telangana region back into the Indian Union.

== Cast ==
- Sai Chand as Ramayya
- Kakarala
- Rami Reddy
- Telangana Shakuntala
- Pradeep Kumar
- Prasad Rao
- Yadagiri
- Kondavalasa Lakshmana Rao
- Pradeep Shakthi as Pratapa Reddy

== Soundtrack ==
- "Bandenaka Bandi Katti Padahaaru Bandlu Katti" written by Bandi Yadagiri
- "Palletoori Pillagaada Pasalagaase Monagaada" (with titles) written by Suddala Hanumanthu
- "Podala Podala Gatla Naduma, Podicinadhira Chandamama"

== Awards ==
Nandi Awards

- Second Best Feature Film - B. Narsing Rao and G. Ravindranath
- Best Screenplay Writer - B. Narsing Rao and Pran Rao

Filmfare Awards South

- Filmfare Best Film Award (Telugu) - B. Narsing Rao
