= Madhu Priya =

Indian Telugu playback singer

- Born: Peddinti Madhu Priya; 26 August 1997 (age 28)
- Origin: Godavarikhani, Andhra Pradesh, India (now in Telangana, India)
- Occupation: Singer
- Years active: 2008–present

Peddinti Madhu Priya is an Indian singer who works in Telugu cinema. She became popular on Telugu television with her folk song "Adapillanamma Nenu Adapilanani". She was one of the participants of the Telugu reality TV show Bigg Boss and she was evicted on Day 13.

== Career ==
Madhu Priya made her Telugu film debut with her singing for the film Daggaraga Dooranga. For the song "Vachinde" from the movie Fidaa, she won the Filmfare Award for Best Play Back Singer Female. She participated in the Star Maa reality series Bigg Boss Telugu and was evicted on Day 13.

== Discography ==
Year	Film	Song	Composer	Notes
2011	Daggaraga Dooranga	"Pedda Puli"	Raghu Kunche	Debut
2011	Thimmaraju	"Molasathi"	Nandan Raj	
2017	Fidaa	"Vachinde"	Shakthikanth Karthick	SIIMA Award for Best Female Playback Singer – Telugu; Filmfare Award for Best Female Playback Singer – Telugu
2018	Touch Chesi Chudu	"	JAM8	
2018	Nela Ticket	"Nela Ticket"	Shakthikanth Karthick	
2018	Saakshyam	"Cheliya Choode"	Harshavardhan Rameshwar	
2018	Operation 2019	"Kaka Nuvvu Keka"	Raprock Shakeel	
2020	Sarileru Neekevvaru	"He Is So Cute"	Devi Sri Prasad	SIIMA Award for Best Female Playback Singer – Telugu
2021	30 Rojullo Preminchadam Ela	"Cat Body Loki"	Anup Rubens	
2022	Bangarraju	"Bangaara"	Anup Rubens	
2025	Sankranthiki Vasthunam	"Godari Gattu"	Bheems Ceciroleo	
2025	Laila	"Oho Rathamma"	Leon James	
2025	Baapu	"Re Rela"	RR Dhruvan	
2026	Mana Shankara Vara Prasad Garu	"Sasirekha"	Bheems Ceciroleo	

== Filmography ==
=== Television ===
Year	Title	Role	Network	Result
2008	Super Singer	Contestant	Star Maa	Second season
2017	Bigg Boss	Contestant	Star Maa	14th Place- Evicted on Day 14
