= Ko Antey Koti =

- Film poster
- Directed by: Anish Kuruvilla
- Written by: Anish Kuruvilla
- Story by: Anish Kuruvilla
- Produced by: Myneni Vasundhara Devi
- Starring: Sharwanand; Priya Anand; Srihari
- Cinematography: Rakesh Erukulla; Naveen Yadav
- Edited by: Marthand K. Venkatesh
- Music by: Shakthikanth Karthick
- Production company: Sarvaa Arts
- Release date: 28 December 2012
- Country: India
- Language: Telugu

Ko Antey Koti (Telugu: కో అంటే కోటి) is a 2012 Indian Telugu-language romantic heist thriller film starring Sharwanand, Priya Anand and Sri Hari. It was directed by Anish Kuruvilla and produced by Sharwanand's mother, Myneni Vasundhara Devi, under the Sarvaa Arts banner. The film's title is based on a song from Kshana Kshanam.

== Plot ==
Vamsi (Sharwanand), a thief who is looking to mend his ways is hired by Maya Master (Sri Hari) another thief who plans on becoming rich on the premise of carrying out one last heist and retire. Maya master has assembled a gang for this purpose. Vamsi and the gang succeed in carrying out the robbery after which Maya Master betrays them and gets away with the money what happened next forms the story.

== Cast ==
- Sharwanand as Koti aka Vamsi
- Priya Anand as Sathya
- Srihari as Mayaloori Madan aka Maya Master
- Lakshman Meesala as Chitti
- Nischal as PC
- Vinay Varma as Ranjit Kumar
- Prabhakar as Don Fredrick
- Thagubothu Ramesh as Drunkard
- Prudhvi Raj

== Soundtrack ==
Ko Ante Koti

Soundtrack album by Shakthikanth Karthick
- Released: 2012
- Recorded: 2012
- Genre: Feature film soundtrack
- Length: 25:45
- Language: Telugu
- Label: Madhura Audio
- Producer: Shakthikanth Karthik

Shakthikanth Karthick chronology
Ko Ante Koti (2012)	Fidaa (2017)

The audio was composed by Shakthikanth Karthick. The audio launch of the film was held at Hitex, Hyderabad. Ram Charan was the chief guest at the event. Navdeep, Sundeep Kishan, Deva Katta, Sekhar Kammula Kamal Kamaraju, S Gopal Reddy, B Gopal, Sravanthi Ravi Kishore, Srihari, Shiva Balaji and others attended the function.

Track-List
No.	Title	Lyrics	Artist(s)	Length
1.	"Ko antey Koti"	BRK	Suraj Jagan	4:11
2.	"O Madhurimave"	Shreshta	Naresh Iyer	3:40
3.	"Varaala Vaana"	Vasistha Sharma	Haricharan, Priya Hemesh	4:48
4.	"Bangaru Konda"	Shreshta	Harini	3:14
5.	"Aagipo"	Vasistha Sharma	Karthik, Swetha Mohan	4:57
6.	"Deham Daaham"	BRK	Shaktikanth Karthik	4:55
Total length:				25:45

== Release ==
The film was given an A certificate by the Censor board due to the violence and unsavoury language. The film was released on 28 December 2012.

== Reception ==
=== Critical response ===
The film received mixed response from critics.

- News18 noted that "It is definitely one of the best Telugu films of the recent past. But what makes this strikingly different film uninspiring is its borrowed inspiration from the west."
