= Sai Chand =

Indian actor and documentary filmmaker

- Born: Tripuraneni Sai Chand; 25 June 1956 (age 70); Kurnool, Andhra State, India
- Education: New Science College, Hyderabad
- Occupations: Actor; filmmaker
- Years active: 1979—1993; 2017—present
- Father: Tripuraneni Gopichand

Tripuraneni Sai Chand (born 25 June 1956) is an Indian actor and documentary filmmaker who works in Telugu cinema, Telugu theatre, and television. He is popularly known for his roles in films like Maa Bhoomi, Fidaa and Sye Raa Narasimha Reddy.

== Early life ==
Tripuraneni Sai Chand was born to noted Telugu writer and humanist Tripuraneni Gopichand and is the grandson of Tripuraneni Ramaswamy. His father died when he was 6 years old. He completed his primary education from Vasavya Vidyalaya, Vijayawada run by Goparaju Ramachandra Rao. His first screen presence was in a film Sati Arundhati as a child actor. He did B.Com. from New Science College, Hyderabad.

== Career ==
Maa Bhoomi (1980) directed by Goutam Ghose was Sai Chand's first film as an actor. His first film was box office hit and went to run for an year. It also received Nandi award, and Film Fare award in the best film category. It was also premiered in several film festivals across the world. He has acted in more than 35 films throughout his career. Sai Chand is commonly associated with parallel cinema like the films Maa Bhoomi, Manchu Pallaki, Pelleedu Pillalu, Ee Charitra Ae Siratho, Ee Desamlo Oka Roju, Rangula Kala, Adavalle Aligithe, Ee Chaduvulu Makkodu, Siva, Ankuram, Fidaa, Sye Raa Narasimha Reddy.

As a filmmaker, he made Pandita Parameshwara Sastry Veelunaamaa as a tele-film. Some of his documentaries are on topics that include: grain storage, dry-land agriculture, rice production technology, and information technology for common man.

Sai Chand has also made documentary films on film-making veterans like L. V. Prasad, Allu Ramalingaiah Singeetam Srinivasa Rao, Suryakantam, Anjali Devi, Bapu, Ramana Duo and others.

== Filmography ==
Key
†	Denotes films that have not yet been released

Year	Title	Role	Notes	Ref.
1979	Maa Bhoomi	Ramaiah		
1981	Erra Mallelu	Kistanna		
1981	Maro Kurukshetram			
1982	Maro Malupu			
1982	Manchu Pallaki	Kumar		
1982	Pelleedu Pillalu	Chandram		
1982	Ee Charitra Ae Saritho			
1983	Ee Desamlo Oka Roju			
1983	Rangula Kala			
1983	Adavalle Aligithe			
1984	Ee Chaduvulu Makkodu			
1985	Vande Mataram	Maridaiah		
1988	Sagatu Manishi			
1989	Siva	Venkat		
1993	Ankuram			
2017	Fidaa	Bhanumathi's father		
2019	Sye Raa Narasimha Reddy	Subbayya		
2021	Uppena	Jalayya		
2021	Check	Satya Narayana		
2021	Konda Polam	Guravappa		
2022	Virata Parvam	Vennela's father		
2023	Virupaksha	Pujari		
2024	Maa Nanna Superhero	Prakash		
2026	Comrade Kalyan	Master		
