= Maa Nanna Superhero =

2024 Indian family drama film

- Theatrical release poster
- Directed by: Abhilash Reddy Kankara
- Written by: Abhilash Reddy Kankara; MVS Bharadwaj; Shravan Madala
- Produced by: Sunil Balusu
- Starring: Sudheer Babu; Sayaji Shinde; Sai Chand; Aarna
- Cinematography: Sameer Kalyani
- Edited by: Anil Kumar Pasala
- Music by: Jay Krish
- Production companies: V Celluloids; VR Global Media; CAM Entertainment
- Release date: 11 October 2024
- Running time: 127 minutes
- Country: India
- Language: Telugu

Maa Nanna Superhero (transl. My Dad is a Superhero) is a 2024 Indian Telugu-language family drama film co-written and directed by Abhilash Reddy Kankara. The film was produced by Sunil Balusu under the banner of V Celluloids and VR Global Media in association with CAM Entertainment. The film stars Sudheer Babu, Sayaji Shinde, Sai Chand, and Aarna.

== Plot ==
A soul-stirring journey discovering the true meaning of love and family connection.

== Cast ==
- Sudheer Babu as Johnny / Mahesh Babu
- Sayaji Shinde as Srinivas
- Sai Chand as Prakash
- Aarna as Tara
- Raju Sundaram
- Shashank as Arshad, a lottery ticket dealer
- Aamani as Srinivas' wife
- Chandra Vempaty
- Annie as Annie
- Jhansi
- Harsha Vardhan as Rashid
- Vishnu Oi
- Venkat as Circle Inspector

== Production ==
=== Development ===
The film was helmed by Abhilash Kankara who previously directed the TV series Loser. The script was written by Abhilash with MVS Bharadwaj and Shravan Madala. The film's title was unveiled on 18 June 2023, coinciding with Father's Day, along with the announcement of the cast and crew. The cast includes Sudheer Babu in the lead role, Aarna as the female lead, and Sai Chand, Sayaji Shinde, Raju Sundaram, Shashank, Aamani, Harshith Malgireddy, and Annie in pivotal roles. Sai Chand was cast as the biological father, while Sayaji Shinde, who collaborated with Abhilash on Loser, was chosen to portray the adoptive father. Babu plays the son role.

=== Filming ===
The filming was wrapped up on 5 September 2023. The film received a U certificate from the Central Board of Film Certification. The cinematography was by Sameer Kalyani, while the editing was handled by Anil Kumar P.

== Soundtrack ==
Maa Nanna Superhero

Soundtrack album by Jay Krish
- Released: 2024
- Genre: Feature film soundtrack
- Length: 19:34
- Language: Telugu
- Label: Aditya Music
- Producer: Jay Krish

Jay Krish chronology
Sathi Gani Rendu Ekaralu (2023)	Maa Nanna Superhero (2024)

Singles from Maa Nanna Superhero
- 1. "Nanna" Released: 19 September 2024; 2. "Vedukalo" Released: 28 September 2024

Audio Jukebox
- Maa Nanna Superhero – Jukebox on YouTube

The soundtrack was composed by Jay Krish. The first single, "Nanna" was released on 19 September 2024. The second single, "Vedukalo" was released on 28 September 2024.

Track listing
No.	Title	Lyrics	Singer(s)	Length
1.	"Nanna Song"	Lakshmi Priyanka	Nazeeruddin	3:30
2.	"Vedukalo"	Sanapati Bharadwaj Patrudu	Aishwarya Daruri, Brinda, Chaitu Satsangi, Akhil Chandra	3:59
3.	"Kanneellu Leva"	Sanare	Kaala Bhairava	3:59
4.	"Dhoom Dhaam"	Sanapati Bharadwaj Patrudu	Saathwik	3:53
5.	"Emito Ee Prema"	Sanare	Pravasthi Aradhya	2:59
6.	"Theme"	—	—	1:14
Total length:				19:34

== Release ==
Maa Nanna Superhero was released theatrically on 11 October 2024.

== Reception ==
Suhas Sistu of The Hans India rated the film three and one-fourth out of five stars and wrote that "The film successfully balances drama, emotions, and a subtle love story, which unfolds naturally without taking away from the serious themes. The comic relief, though minimal, feels organic and helps lighten the mood at appropriate times." Paul Nicodemus of The Times of India gave it three out of five stars and wrote, "Maa Nanna Superhero is a decent family drama that touches on universal themes of love, sacrifice, and redemption. While it excels in its performances and certain emotional moments, it is held back by a predictable plot and inconsistent pacing. Viewers seeking a heartwarming story may find it enjoyable."

BH Harsh of The New Indian Express wrote that "Abhilash Reddy Kankara clearly has the flair for capturing moments that convey the poignance of his themes. If only he also had a script that was more coherent, with more of these moments woven in, moments that say a lot without saying much." Sangeetha Devi Dundoo of The Hindu wrote that "Sudheer Babu and Saichand's performances anchor Maa Nanna Superhero, an uneven relationship drama that scores in a few segments".

Swaroop Kodur of The Hollywood Reporter India wrote that "Though slightly overripe, Abhilash Kankara's film works because it unfolds like an affectionate relationship procedural that views a complicated scenario through a new lens." Sashidhar Adivi of Times Now gave the film two-and-a-half out of five stars and opined that "Maa Nanna Superhero is a well-made film with a decent story and good performances. However, the writing looks far from complete. For some reason, the film leaves you wanting for more in terms of deft screenplay and better execution."
