= Happy Wedding (2018 film) =

- Promotional Poster
- Directed by: Lakshman Karya
- Written by: Lakshman Karya
- Based on: Mumbai-Pune-Mumbai 2
- Produced by: M. Sumanth Raju; V. Vamsi Krishna Reddy; Pramod Uppalapati
- Starring: Sumanth Ashwin; Niharika Konidela
- Cinematography: P. Balreddy
- Edited by: K. V. Krishna Reddy
- Music by: Score: S. Thaman; Songs: Shakthikanth Karthick
- Production companies: Pocket Cinema; UV Creations
- Release date: 28 July 2018
- Country: India
- Language: Telugu

Happy Wedding is a 2018 Indian Telugu-language romantic drama film directed by Lakshman Karya. The film stars Sumanth Ashwin and Niharika Konidela. It was produced under Pocket Cinema in collaboration with UV Creations. The film was released on July 28 to mixed reviews from critics. The film was a remake of the Marathi film Mumbai-Pune-Mumbai 2 (2015).

== Plot ==
Akshara (Niharika Konidela) a designer and Anand (Sumanth Ashwin) an ad film director are in love and their love has been accepted by their parents (Naresh, Pavitra Lokesh, Murali Sharma, Tulasi). Their marriage preparations have been started. Meanwhile, Vijay (Raja Chambolu) an entrepreneur in the fashion industry who is Akshara's ex-boyfriend tries to convince her to restart their relationship, but Akshara doesn't accept his proposal and advises him to move on. Then Akshara and Anand try to mingle with each others families successfully. Then after their engagement, in some critical circumstances, Anand avoids Akshara then Akshara misunderstands Anand and tells him in front of Vijay that he is taking her for granted and she broke up with Vijay because of that reason, so now he was also thinking like that and questions Anand as to what's the difference between him and Vijay.

Then Anand advises her that if she doesn't want this marriage she has full freedom to call it off. But Akshara takes some time to rethink her decision. Later, Vijay, while going to London for a meeting advises Akshara to decide soon or else it may be too late and he says that if she had any feelings for him he would come back for her.

Then the marriage preparations are started in Vijayawada at Anand's residence. Day by day Anand became tensed because of Akshara's confused mindset and he tries to convince her to take back her decision. Later Akshara's friend Laveena (Pujita Ponnada) and her aunt Niraja (Indraja) a psychologist try to realise her mistake in decision making. But Akshara is still in confusion whether to make it or break it.

Finally, with two days left till the wedding, Anand asks Akshara about her decision, but she gives no reply and Anand confirms that she does not like him and decides to call off the marriage. But Akshara tries to stop him to not tell the either of the parents, then he explains about his situation and pressure of the bridegroom's family. Then he decided to tell the issue to his parents and call off the marriage. But Akshara's parents hear all the conversation, then Anand tries to make the situation cool, takes the blame on himself asks Akshara's father to not scold Akshara after he leaves. Then her father supports her daughter and says that whether her decision is good or bad he will stay by her side and decides to apologize to Anand's family, but Anand convinces them to go back to Hyderabad and he will convince his family to stop the wedding.

Later in Anand's residence in the confession time, Anand confess everything that happened in the marriage. Then suddenly to his surprise, Akshara interrupts Anand and conveys her feelings and fears about the marriage and now she has overcome that and says she is ready for the marriage and proposes to Anand for the marriage.

Then in the final day all the misunderstandings had gone and the movie ends with Akshara and Anand's "Happy Wedding".

== Cast ==
- Sumanth Ashwin as Anand
- Niharika Konidela as Akshar
- Murali Sharma as Akshara's father
- Naresh as Anand's father
- Pavitra Lokesh as Anand's mother
- Tulasi as Akshara's mother
- Indraja as Neeraja, Akshara'a Aunt
- Pujita Ponnada as Laveena
- Raja Chembolu as Vijay
- Annapoorna as Anand's grandmother
- Jahanzeb as Prakash
- Preethi Asrani as Akshara's sister

== Soundtrack ==
The songs were composed by Shakthikanth Karthick while S. Thaman provided the score.

No.	Title	Singer(s)	Length
1.	"Chaluva Chengaluva"	Sinduri Vishal
2.	"Kaadhani Nuvvantunnadhi"	HemaChandra
3.	"Dheemthana Thomthana"	Dinkar
4.	"It's a Beautiful Day"	Dhanunjay

== Box office ==
Happy Wedding opened to a lukewarm response at the box office, but could not collect much money because of RX 100, which was running in theaters for a very long time. It became a flop at the box office due to lack of interest in moviegoers.

== Critical reception ==
The film got mixed to poor reviews at the box office.

The Times of India gave it 2.5 stars and wrote, "Lakshman Karya falters a bit with his screenplay in parts, inserting unwanted sequences that don’t move the story forward in any manner. Nor does he deliver a satisfying enough conclusion for Akshara to suddenly realise her folly. However, he must be lauded for attempting to deliver something more than usual gloss. Shaktikath Karthik is a delight, with his music not blocking the flow of the film in any manner, S Thaman’s BGM’s on the other hand falters in certain scenes."

GreatAndhra gave it two stars and wrote, "All in all, “Happy Wedding” is a simple love story of a confused girl that is told with some bright visuals, some nice jokes but turns out to be dreary and nagging."

123telugu gave the film three stars and stated, "On the whole, Happy Wedding is a passable family drama which showcases a contemporary theme which is synonymous with the current generation. The emotions work well but the film takes its own time to register as it is based on urban relationships and bonding. Because of this, some might really like it and a few other sections may disown it right away giving the film a limited appeal this weekend."

Sify gave the film 2.5 stars and said, "Happy Wedding is all about plastic romance, plastic emotions. It is much like extended short film with wafer thin plot of a young woman with insecurities that come from her past relationship. It drags on post interval."

Idlebrain's Jeevi said, "Though it’s a remake of a Marathi blockbuster Mumbai Pune Mumbai 2, Happy Wedding is a risky film to make despite being in salable genres like romance and family drama because the entire film revolves around a wafer-thin subject. The director has succeeded in getting few moments right, but couldn’t give a racy narration and a convincing second half. The entire film is class and glossy and will be liked the ultra class audiences. The lack of logic (heroine’s foolishness in second half and hero’s lethargy in first half (not going to bus station when his fiance is waiting all alone)) which form the basic conflict point might make you squirm!".
