= Chali Cheemalu =

1978 film

- Directed by: Devadas Kanakala
- Written by: Paruchuri Venkateswara Rao (dialogues)
- Starring: Nutan Prasad; Rallapalli; S. P. Sailaja
- Music by: L. Vaidyanathan
- Release date: 7 July 1978
- Country: India
- Language: Telugu

Chali Cheemalu is a 1978 Telugu film directed by Devadas Kanakala. The film stars Nutan Prasad, Rallapalli and S. P. Sailaja. Paruchuri Venkateswara Rao, elder of the Paruchuri Brothers entered the Telugu cinema field as writer. Novel of Mandha Venkata Ramana Rao was developed into a full-length movie by their writing skills. Nutan Prasad’s catch phrase Notokka jillaala andagaadni became popular among the Telugu audience. The film won two Nandi Awards.

== Cast ==
- Nutan Prasad
- Rallapalli
- S. P. Sailaja
- Satyendra Kumar

== Soundtrack ==
- "Bajana Sedhama Srirama Namamu"
- "Bhoomi Poye" (Lyrics: Rallapalli; Singer: Rallapalli)
- "Voorukove Chitti Thalli"

== Awards ==
Nandi Awards - 1978

- Second Best Feature Film - Silver - J. Venkatarya.
- Best Story Writer - Mandha Venkataramana Rao

== Legacy ==
Nutan Prasad’s catchphrase "Nootokka jillalaku andagadni" (transl. I'm the handsome of 101 districts) became popular among the Telugu audience. The phrase was adapted as a title for the film Nootokka Jillala Andagadu (2021)
