= Shakthikanth Karthick =

Indian Telugu composer

- Years active: 2008–present
- Notable work: Fidaa (2017)

Shakthikanth Karthick is an Indian composer who works in Telugu-language films and is known for his work for the film Fidaa (2017).

== Early life and career ==
Shaktikanth grew up in Chennai and studied engineering at REC (Calicut). He worked as a keyboard programmer and in scoring for a few films including Avakai Biryani (2008) before making his debut as a composer with Ko Ante Koti. He received his breakthrough with Fidaa (2017), which was set in Telangana. Shaktikanth credits the success of the film's music including the song "Vachinde" to director Sekhar Kammula who had a concrete vision of the setting of each of the songs.

As for his lack of frequent compositions, he said that he prefers quality over quantity.

== Discography ==
=== As composer ===
- All productions are in Telugu, unless otherwise noted

Films

List of original film soundtracks and scores
Year	Title	Score	Songs	Notes
2012	Ko Antey Koti	Yes	Yes	
2013	Satya 2	Yes	No	Hindi-Telugu bilingual film
2016	Yerupu	No	Yes	Film unreleased
2017	Fidaa	Yes	Yes	Nominated–Filmfare Award for Best Music Director – Telugu; Nominated–SIIMA Award for Best Music Director – Telugu; Nominated–Zee Telugu Golden Award for Best Music Director
2018	Nela Ticket	Yes	Yes	
2018	Happy Wedding	No	Yes	
2021	Nootokka Jillala Andagadu	Yes	Yes	
2023	Umapathi	Yes	Yes	

Television

Year	Title	Score	Songs	Notes
2019	Gods of Dharmapuri	Yes	No	
2024	Brinda	Yes	Yes	
2025	Mayasabha	Yes	No	

Independent work

- "Ravali Jagan, Kavali Jagan" for Y. S. Jagan Mohan Reddy
