= Nandi Award for Best Female Playback Singer =

Indian film award

The Nandi Award for Best Female Playback Singer was awarded from 1977 to 2016 by the Government of Andhra Pradesh. Below is the list of the award recipients.

== Winners ==
Year	Singer	Film	Song
1977	P. Susheela	Daana Veera Soora Karna	"Ye Thalli Ninu Kannado"
1978	P. Susheela	Naalaaga Endaro	
1979	Vani Jairam	Sankarabharanam	
1980	S. Janaki	Sri Vasavi Kanyaka Parameswari Mahatyam	"Parasakthi Mahasakthi"
1981	S. Janaki	Saptapadi	"Govullu Tellana"
1982	P. Susheela	Meghasandesam	"Aakulo Aakunai"
1983	S. Janaki	Sagara Sangamam	"Om Namah Shivaaya"
1984	P. Susheela	Sangeetha Samrat	"Yentha Sogasugaade"
1985	S. Janaki	Pratighatana	"Ee Duryodhana Dushasana"
1986	S. Janaki	Aruna Kiranam	"Dhanvantari Varasulam"
1987	P. Susheela	Viswanatha Nayakudu	"Kavijana Samaja Bhoja"
1988	S. Janaki	Janaki Ramudu	"Nee Charana Kamalam"
1989	P. Susheela	Godavari Pongindi	"Eppatla Godavari"
1990	K. S. Chithra	Seetharamayya Gari Manavaralu	"Kaliki Chilakala Koliki"
1991	K. S. Chithra	Manjeera Naadam	"Pacchi Yodalidana"
1992	K. S. Chithra	Rajeswari Kalyanam	
1993	K. S. Chithra	Mathru Devo Bhava	"Venuvai Vacchanu"
1994	S. Janaki	Bhairava Dweepam	"Naruda O Naruda"
1995	S. P. Sailaja	Subha Sankalpam	"Seethamma Andalu"
1996	K. S. Chithra	Maavichiguru	"Maata Ivvamma Chelli"
1997	S. Janaki	Thodu	"Nadila Pravahinchede"
1998	S. Janaki	Anthahpuram	"Sooreedu Puvva"
1999	K. S. Chithra	Swayamvaram	"Marala Thelupana"
2000	S. Janaki	Sri Sai Mahima	"Enthenta Daya Needi"
2001	Usha	Padma	"Kallu Theravani"
2002	Usha	Nee Sneham	"Chinuku Tadiki"
2003	Sunitha	Athade Oka Sainyam	"Naa Paata"
2004	K. S. Chithra	Varsham	"Nuvvostanante Nenoddantana"
2005	Nitya Santoshini	Moguds Pellams	"Ninne Daachanu"
2006	Sunitha	Godavari	"Andanga Lena"
2007	Kousalya	Satyabhama	"Gundelona Nuvve"
2008	Geetha Madhuri	Nachavule	"Ninne Ninne"
2009	K. S. Chithra	Kalavaramaye Madilo	"Pallavinchani"
2010	Pranavi	Sneha Geetham	"Sarigamapadani"
2011	Malavika	Rajanna	"Amma Avani"
2012	Geetha Madhuri	Good Morning	"Yedalo Nadilaga"
2013	Kalpana Raghavendar	Intinta Annamayya	"Nava Moorthulainatti"
2014	K. S. Chithra	Mukunda	"Gopikamma"
2015	Chinmayi	Malli Malli Idi Rani Roju	"Yenno Yenno"
2016	Chinmayi	Kalyana Vaibhogame	"Manasantha Meghamai"

== Nandi TV Awards ==
The Nandi TV Award for Best Female Playback Singer in a Telugu television serial was also awarded every year until 2016.

Year	Singer	Serial	Song
2016	Chaithra	Sita Mahalakshmi (Star Maa)	
2015	Pranavi	Geethanjali	
2014	Ramya Behara	Atharintiki Daredi	
2013	Anjana Sowmya	Pellinati Pramanalu	
2012	Pranavi	Manasu Mamata	
2011	Naga Sahithi	Muddu Bidda (Zee TV)	
2010	Sunitha	Anthahpuram	
2009	Kousalya	Aadade Adharam	
2008	Pranavi	Turupu Velle Railu	"Monna Eduru Chusa"
2007	Nitya Santoshini	Jabili	"Ashala Pandiri Needalo"
2006	Usha	Bommarillu	
2005	Malavika	Melukolupu	"Kottaga Sari Kottaga"
2004	V. Sasikala Swamy	Kalyani (Doordarshan)	"Rammanna Radu Pommanna Podu"
2003	Gopika Poornima	Priyanka	"Amma Antu Amme dantu"
2002	Kousalya	Endamavulu	
2001	Nitya Santoshini	Aadadi	
2000	S. Janaki	Anubandham	"Idi deepalu velige"
1999	K. S. Chithra	Anveshitha	"Kshana Kshanam"
1998	Sunitha	Antarangalu	
1997	Saritha	Bala Bharathi	
1996	S. P. Sailaja	Damn It Katha Addam Thirigindhi	

=== Most won ===
Winners with most wins
Artist	Wins
S. Janaki	11
K. S. Chithra	11
P. Susheela	6

== See also ==
- List of music awards honoring women
