= Sri Ramadasu =

- Theatrical release poster
- Directed by: K. Raghavendra Rao
- Written by: J. K. Bharavi
- Screenplay by: K. Raghavendra Rao
- Based on: Life of Kancharla Gopanna
- Produced by: Konda Krishnam Raju
- Starring: Akkineni Nageswara Rao; Akkineni Nagarjuna
- Cinematography: S. Gopal Reddy
- Edited by: A. Sreekar Prasad
- Music by: M. M. Keeravani
- Production company: Aditya Movies
- Release date: 30 March 2006
- Running time: 150 minutes
- Country: India
- Language: Telugu
- Budget: ₹18 crore
- Box office: ₹14 crore distributors' share

Sri Ramadasu is 2006 Indian Telugu-language biographical film, based on the life of musician saint Kancharla Gopanna . A reboot of V. Nagayya's 1964 film Ramadasu; the film is written and directed by K. Raghavendra Rao . Produced by Konda Krishnam Raju, the film starred Akkineni Nageswara Rao and Akkineni Nagarjuna in lead roles, while the music was composed by M. M. Keeravani. Cinematography and editing were handled by S. Gopal Reddy and Sreekar Prasad respectively.

== Cast ==
- Akkineni Nageswara Rao as Kabirdas
- Akkineni Nagarjuna as Kancharla Gopanna /Ramadasu
- Suman as Rama / Vishnu
- Sneha as Kamala, Ramadasu’s wife
- Veda Sastry as Sita / Lakshmi
- Sujatha as Dammakka
- Nassar as Abul Hasan Qutb Shah
- K.Naga Babu as Ravana
- Brahmanandam
- Sunil As Ramana Sastry
- Dharmavarapu Subramanyam as Seshabhisha Sastry
- Tanikella Bharani as Kamala's father
- Venu Madhav
- AVS
- Ali
- Raghu Babu
- Sameer Hasan as Lakshmana
- Sarath Babu as Sage Bhadra
- Vindu Dara Singh as Hanuman
- Jaya Prakash Reddy as Mathisahib
- Ranganath as Gopanna's father
- Raghunatha Reddy as Madanna
- Subbaraya Sharma as Akkanna
- Ananth Babu
- Chitti Babu
- Duvvasi Mohan
- J. K. Bharavi
- Sudha as Gopanna's mother
- Siva Parvathi as Kamala's mother
- Hema as Tanisha's wife
- Apoorva
- Master Sajja Teja as Raghunathudu (Ramadasu's son)

== Production ==
It was announced that Nagarjuna would do a film , produced by Konda Krishnam Raju on Aditya Movies banner and directed by K. Raghavendra Rao .Jyothika was roped in to play the female lead, but refused the offer due to her marriage preparations. Then she was replaced by Sneha later.

== Soundtrack ==
Sri Ramadasu

Soundtrack album by M. M. Keeravani
- Released: 2006
- Genre: Soundtrack
- Length: 49:58
- Label: Aditya Music
- Producer: M. M. Keeravani

M. M. Keeravani chronology
Allari Bullodu (2005)	Sri Ramadasu (2006)	Vikramarkudu (2006)

Music was composed by M. M. Keeravani . Lyrics are written by Veturi, Chandrabose, Suddala Ashok Teja, Sri Vedavyasa, J. K. Bharavi and Siva Shakthi Datta while vocals are given by S. P. Balasubrahmanyam, Chitra, Shankar Mahadevan, M. M. Keeravani, Vijay Yesudas, Devi Sri Prasad, S. P. B. Charan, Madhu Balakrishnan, Hariharan, Sunitha , Malavika and Pranavi. Music was released on Aditya Music Company.

No.	Title	Lyrics	Singer(s)	Length
1.	"Sri Raghavam"	Traditional	M. M. Keeravani	0:58
2.	"Adigadigo Badragiri"	Veturi	S. P. Balasubrahmanyam	3:59
3.	"Hylessa"	Suddala Ashok Teja	M. M. Keeravani, Devi Sri Prasad, Malavika	4:16
4.	"Antha Ramamayam"	Ramadasu Keerthana	S. P. Balasubrahmanyam	3:26
5.	"Isvakulaku"	Ramadasu Keerthana	Shankar Mahadevan	2:08
6.	"Allah Rama"	Vedavyas	Shankar Mahadevan, Vijay Yesudas	4:18
7.	"Idhigidhigo"	J. K. Bhairavi	Sunitha	2:25
8.	"Charanamulane"	Ramadasu Keerthana	K. S. Chithra, Madhu Balakrishnan, Ramachari	4:00
9.	"Chalu Chalu Chalu"	Chandrabose	SP Charan, Sunitha	3:20
10.	"Nannu Brovamani"	Ramadasu Keerthana	S. P. Balasubrahmanyam, Sunitha	2:55
11.	"Sri Rama Rama Ramethi"	Traditional	M. M. Keeravani	0:44
12.	"Entho Ruchira"	Ramadasu Keerthana	S. P. Balasubrahmanyam	2:49
13.	"Paluke Bangaramayena"	Ramadasu Keerthana	K. S. Chithra, M. M. Keeravani	3:58
14.	"Shuddha Brahma"	Traditional	Pranavi	2:19
15.	"Bhadra Shaila"	Ramadasu Keerthana	K. S. Chithra, Hariharan	4:58
16.	"Ye Theerugananu"	Ramadasu Keerthana	Vijay Yesudas	2:07
17.	"Thandri Matanu"	J. K. Bhairavi	Sunitha	0:44
18.	"Dhasaradhi"	Vedavyas	S. P. Balasubrahmanyam, K. S. Chithra	3:46
19.	"Mangalam"	Ramadasu Keerthana	Chorus	0:49
Total length:				49:58

== Release and reception ==
Sri Ramadasu was released in 229 screens including 173 in Andhra Pradesh 18 in Karnataka, two in Chennai, one in Mumbai and 25 overseas.

The film was met with positive reviews. The lead actor Nagarjuna and music director M. M. Keeravani received extremely positive appreciations for their respective works in this film. Particularly, Nagarjuna's performance was highly praised by most of the critics.

Telugu movie reviewing website idle brain gave 3.75 out of 5 and wrote, "He (Nagarjuna) did extremely well in the title role. His histrionics in the last reel where ‘Dasaradhi’ song comes are extraordinary. Nobody knows how Sri Ramadasu looks like and whenever we think about Sri Ramadasu in the future, the image of Nagarjuna becomes the visual aid. The first half of the film is decent. The emotional graph starts growing up from ‘Antha Ramamayam’ song and goes to the peak by the film reaches climax. The second half of the film is very good. The plus points of this film are Nagarjuna's histrionics, Keeravani's music, K Raghavendra Rao's direction of J. K. Bharavi's script. Sri Ramadasu film comes as fresh breeze when we are bombarded with routine and formula flicks. I recommend this devotional flick to everybody."

India glitz gave a positive review and praised Nagarjuna's performance, in particular, stating, "Nagarjuna is a revelation in a role that calls for nuances and skill. It is no romp for him. He has put in hard labor both in terms of looks as well as body language. The triumph of this role lies in the fact that Nags got the subtleties right. An award is just round the corner for him. Keeravani in a sense is the other hero of the movie. There are 19 songs, each dipped in his own devotion to his art. Like in Annamaiya (Annamayya), he has delivered more than he has been asked for. His songs create the right mood and momentum for the film to proceed. The bhakti rasa is splendidly brought out."

The Hindu praised Nagarjuna and M. M. Keeravani and wrote, "Nagarjuna steals the show as Ramadasu. After playing the role of his lifetime in Annamayya, Nagarjuna comes up with another winner in Sri Ramadasu. Nag (Nagarjuna) once again proves he is equally at ease portraying epic characters apart from playing mass, sentiment and glamor roles. The highlight of the film is the performance of Nagarjuna in the prison episode. Keeravani gives a musical chartbuster and both songs as well as background score and re-recording is excellent and takes the audience into a musical journey. Graphic works are superb."

== Box-office ==
The film had a 100-day run in 67 centres and collected a distributors' share of over ₹14 crore at the box office.

== Awards ==
Filmfare Awards - 2006

- Filmfare Award for Best Male Playback Singer - Telugu - S.P. Balasubramaniam
- Filmfare Award for Best Cinematographer – South - S. Gopal Reddy

Nandi Awards - 2006

- Best Home-viewing Feature Film - Konda Krishnam Raju
- Best Actor - Nagarjuna
- Best Makeup Artist - Ramachandra Rao
- Best Costume Designer - Basha
