= Annie (Telugu actress) =

Indian actor

- Born: Anusha; 27 March 2001 (age 25); Kottayam, Kerala, India
- Occupation: Actor
- Years active: 2005–present

Annie, known popularly as Baby Annie, (born 31 March 2001) is an Indian actress who appears in Telugu films. She is known for the role of Mallamma in the 2011 period film Rajanna, for which she received a Nandi Award. She made her debut through Anukokunda Oka Roju alongside Jagapathi Babu and Charmi. Her other notable films include Swagatham, Athidi, Stalin and Ek Niranjan.

== Early life and career ==
She has won three Nandi Awards, one for the telefilm Trap (2007), another for the TV show Gorintaku (2010) and another for Rajanna (2011). She have also won Filmfare Award for Best Supporting Actress – Telugu for the latter.

== Filmography ==
Year	Title	Role	Notes
2005	Anukokunda Oka Roju	Child Tuition Student	Debut as Child Actress
2006	Vikramarkudu	Neha Singh Rathore	
2006	Stalin	Stalin's friend's daughter	
2007	Madhumasam	uncredited role	
2007	Vijayadasami	Sivakasi's sister's childhood role	
2007	Athidhi	young Amrita	
2008	Swagatham	KK's daughter	
2008	Ready	Pooja's family member	
2008	Souryam	Vijay's sister's childhood role	
2009	Mitrudu	Adhitya's small sister in law	
2009	Ek Niranjan	Sameera's guitar student	
2010	Kedi	Ramesh's sister's childhood role	
2010	Shiva	Pinky	Bhojpuri film; Bhojpuri Debut
2010	Khaleja	Revived dead girl	
2011	Rajanna	Mallamma	Debut as Child Lead Actress; receivedNandi Award for Best Child Actress; Filmfare Award for Best Supporting Actress – Telugu; CineMAA Special Appreciation Award; Santosham Film Award for Best Child Artist; TSR–TV9 National Film Awards Special Jury Award – Best Child Actress
2012	Nuvvekkadunte Nenakkadunta	Orphan child	
2012	Chaduvukovali	Sita	
2013	Doosukeltha	Young Alekhya "Chinni"	
2018	Rangasthalam	Chinni	Debut as adult actress
2023	Thika Maka Thanda	Mallika	Debut as lead actress
2024	Yevam	Keerthi	
2024	Nindha	Sudha	
2024	Maa Nanna Superhero	Annie	
2026	Tholi Prema Katha	Vara Lakshmi	filming

=== Television ===
Year	Title	Role	Network	Notes
2005–2007	Amrutham	Appaji's daughter	Gemini TV	3 episodes titled "Nanna"; Episode 239–240

=== Web Series ===
Year	Title	Role	Network	Notes
2020–2022	Loser	Young Ruby Shabana	ZEE5	Web Debut; 2 Seasons
2024	21 and Pregnant	Anuhya Parvataneni "Anu"	YouTube	
2025	Hometown	Jyothi	Aha	
2026	Veerabhadruni Rahasyam	Dr. Vennela	ZEE5	
2026	Tholu Bommalu	Siri	ETV Win	

=== Short films ===
Year	Title	Role	Network	Notes
2013	Maro Prapancham	Rani	YouTube	
