= Malavika (singer) =

- Born: Visakhapatnam, Andhra Pradesh, India
- Occupations: Singer, television anchor, dubbing artist.
- Instrument: Vocalist
- Years active: 1999 – present

Malavika is an Indian playback singer, who predominantly works in Telugu cinema. Malavika started her singing career with the song "Nuvvu nenu kalisunte" for the movie Gangotri. Malavika, who is a Nandi Award winner as the 'best playback singer' for the years 2006 and 2011 . Malavika has sung over 3200 songs.she sung around 700 songs movies .she sang 2500 private and devotional songs. She was also the winner of ETV Padutha Teeyaga as a child. She is regularly seen on shows like ETV Swarabhishekam, MAATV super singer series 7, 8, and 9.

Her hit songs include "Bommali", a chartbuster song from the movie Billa, Amma avani (Rajanna), Sunday Monday( Khaleja), Vennelaina cheekataina( Prema Kathaa Chitram) and "Holessa" from Sri Ramadasu. Apart from these, she has sung many hit songs in Telugu. She has also sung a few songs in Kannada and Hindi. In fact her first song was an English song for the movie Rockford. Her next song was a Hindi songs for the movie Bollywood Calling.

== Awards ==
=== Nandi Awards ===
- Nandi Award for "Kotthaga Sarikotthaga" song from Melukolupu serial in 2005.
- Nandi Award for "Amma Avani " song from Rajanna movie in 2011.

=== Sakshi Excellence Award ===
- Sakshi excellence Award for "Untale Untale" song from Soggade Chinni Nayana movie in 2016.

== Television ==
- Final winner of Padutha Theeyaga in 1998, hosted by S. P. Balasubrahmanyam on ETV.
- She is participated in Super Singer 9 in the year 2016.
- Worked as a judge along with music director Koti, Mano and singer Pranavi on Gemini TV show Bol Baby Bol in 2017.

== Discography ==
Year	Song	Film	Language	Music director	Ref.
1999	"Find Me"	Rockford	English	Shankar–Ehsaan–Loy, Leslee Lewis	
2003	"Nuvvu Nenu Kalisunte","Oka Thotalo"	Gangotri	Telugu		
2003	"Godavarilaa"	Charminar	Telugu		
2005	"Neeli"	Mr. Errababu	Telugu		
2006	"Chikka Chikka"	Honeymoon Express	Kannada		
2006	"Hylessa"	Sri Ramadasu	Telugu	M. M. Keeravani	
2006	"Joa Lali"	Vikramarkudu	Telugu	M. M. Keeravani	
2008	"Omkaram"	Veruthe Oru Bharya	Malayalam		
2009	"Nelalu Garu"	Evaraina Epudaina	Telugu		
2009	"Nee Meedha Naku"	Nachav Alludu	Telugu		
2009	"Bommali"	Billa	Telugu	Mani Sharma	
2009	"Nee Perenaa"	Dheera	Telugu	Yuvan Shankar Raja	
2009	"Evaru Lerani"	Ek Niranjan	Telugu	Mani Sharma	
2010	"Sannayi Mrogindi"	Jhummandi Naadam	Telugu	M. M. Keeravani	
2010	"Kalalu Kaavaule", "Thalambraalatho", "Aidhurojula Pelli"	Varudu	Telugu	Mani Sharma	
2010	"Bellampalli Pilla"	Aunty Uncle Nadagopal	Telugu		
2010		Hasini	Telugu		
2010	"Sunday Monday"	Khaleja	Telugu	Mani Sharma	
2010	"Nee Palukulu"	Saradaga Kasepu	Telugu		
2010	"Nuvante"	Taj Mahal	Telugu		
2010	"Andamaina Aasa Undi"	Mayagadu	Telugu		
2010	"Nana Hurdya"	Kanasali Jotheyali	Kannada		
2010	"Audgunthundi", "Andhamemo Istaraku"	Don Seenu	Telugu		
2010	"Em Pillo Em Pillado"	Em Pillo Em Pillado	Telugu		
2010	"Evaro Chepparu", "Muddu Muddu"	Dammunnodu	Telugu		
2010	"Nuvvoka Pivvula"	Kothimooka	Telugu		
2010		Young India	Telugu		
2010	"Kanulara Chudhamu"	Simha	Telugu		
2010	"Gichi Gichi"	Ranga The Donga	Telugu		
2010	"Enduke"	High School	Telugu		
2010	"Marcheyi Marcheyi"	Chetilo Cheyyesi	Telugu		
2010	"Bailele Bailele Pallaki"	Subhapradam	Telugu		
2011	"Yamaga Unde"	Shakti	Telugu	Mani Sharma	
2011	"Amma Avani"	Rajanna	Telugu	M. M. Keeravani	
2011	"Kala Nijamaithe", "Evadabba Sommani"	Maa Voori Maharshi	Telugu		
2012	"Ramanavmi"	Shirdi Sai	Telugu	M. M. Keeravani	
2012	"Ninnu Nalo Dachukunna"	O Manasa	Telugu		
2013	"Vennelaina Cheekataina"	Prema Katha Chitram	Telugu	J.B.	
2014	"Guleba Kavali"	Eduruleni Alexander	Telugu		
2016	"Bhoogolam Bantilaga"	Right Right	Telugu	J.B.	
2016	"Untale Untale"	Soggade Chinni Nayana	Telugu	Anup Rubens	
2016	"Nee Chilipi"	Rule	Telugu	John Galt	
2016	"Fidaa"	Fidaa	Telugu	Shakthikanth Karthick	
2017	"Toli Pravasame"	Rogue	Telugu	Sunil Kashyap	
2017	"Savi Anubhavavo"	Rogue	Kannada	Sunil Kashyap	
2018	"Yenniyallo Yenniyallo"	Naa Peru Surya	Telugu	Vishal–Shekhar	
2022	"Vadi Vadiga"	Induvadana	Telugu	Shiva Kakani	
2022	"Baava taakithe"	Sammathame	Telugu		
2023	"Theme song"	BRO	Telugu	Thaman S	
2023	"Main peeche"	Skanda	Telugu	Thaman S	
2023	"Pattana o pattu"	Keedaa Cola	Telugu	Vivek Sagar	
2023	"Munivara munivara"	Seetharamapuramlo	Telugu	S. S. Nivas	
2024	"Nee Tolakari"	Kallu Compound 1995	Telugu	Teki Sai Srinivasu	
2026	"Sippu Sippu"	Gossip	Telugu	Shakthikanth Karthick	

== Serial title songs ==
- Anubandhalu song from "Anubandhalu" Serial on Gemini Tv in 2012.
- Nannu kadhani song from "varudhini Parinayam" Serial on Zee Telugu in 2013.
- Kanna ninnu kanna song from "Yamaleela" Serial on ETV in 2020.
