= Suddala Hanmanthu =

Indian poet (died 1982)

Suddala Hanumanthu
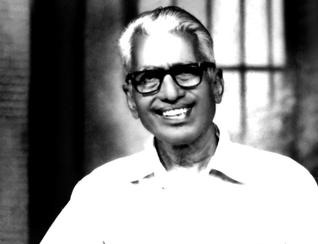
- Born: Suddala, Nalgonda District, India, june 06, 1908
- Died: October 10, 1982
- Occupation: Writer
- Partner: Janakamma
- Children: Suddala Ashok Teja
- Writing career
- Language: Telugu
- Genre: Freedom fighter
- Subjects: Freedom, democracy, liberation, equality
- Literary movement: Telangana Rebellion

Suddala Hanmanthu was a noted Indian poet of the mid 1900s. He wrote songs like "Palleturi pillagada... pasulagaase monagaada..." (featured in the film Maa Bhoomi).

== Early life ==
Suddala Hanmanthu was born in Paladugu village, Mothkur mandal. Later, he moved to Suddala village in the Gundala mandal, Yadadri Bhuvanagiri district, Telangana.

== Career ==
Suddala Hanmanthu's poetry inspired the people of Telangana to participate in the communist-led peasant struggle against the oppressive rule of feudal lords and the Nizam. Along with his contemporary leader Gurram Yadagiri Reddy, a famous communist leader, he fought against Doras and Gadi's rule. This struggle was known in Indian history as the Telangana Rebellion.

The themes of his writing included freedom from the bonded labour known as Vetti Chakiri, democracy, liberation, equality and communism.

His Telugu folk song, "Palletoori Pillagada", mobilised the people of his region. It was included in the movie Maa Bhoomi (1980). The movie Rajanna, starring Nagarjuna, is inspired by Suddala Hanumanthu's life.

== Personal life ==
Suddala Hanmanthu was married to Janakamma and his son Suddala Ashok Teja is a contemporary lyricist. He earned fame for his Telugu songs and was awarded the National Film Award for Best Lyrics in 2003. They also had another two sons and a daughter. The Telugu actor Uttej is his grandson, son of his daughter.
