= Suddala Ashok Teja =

Indian poet and lyricist (born 1954)

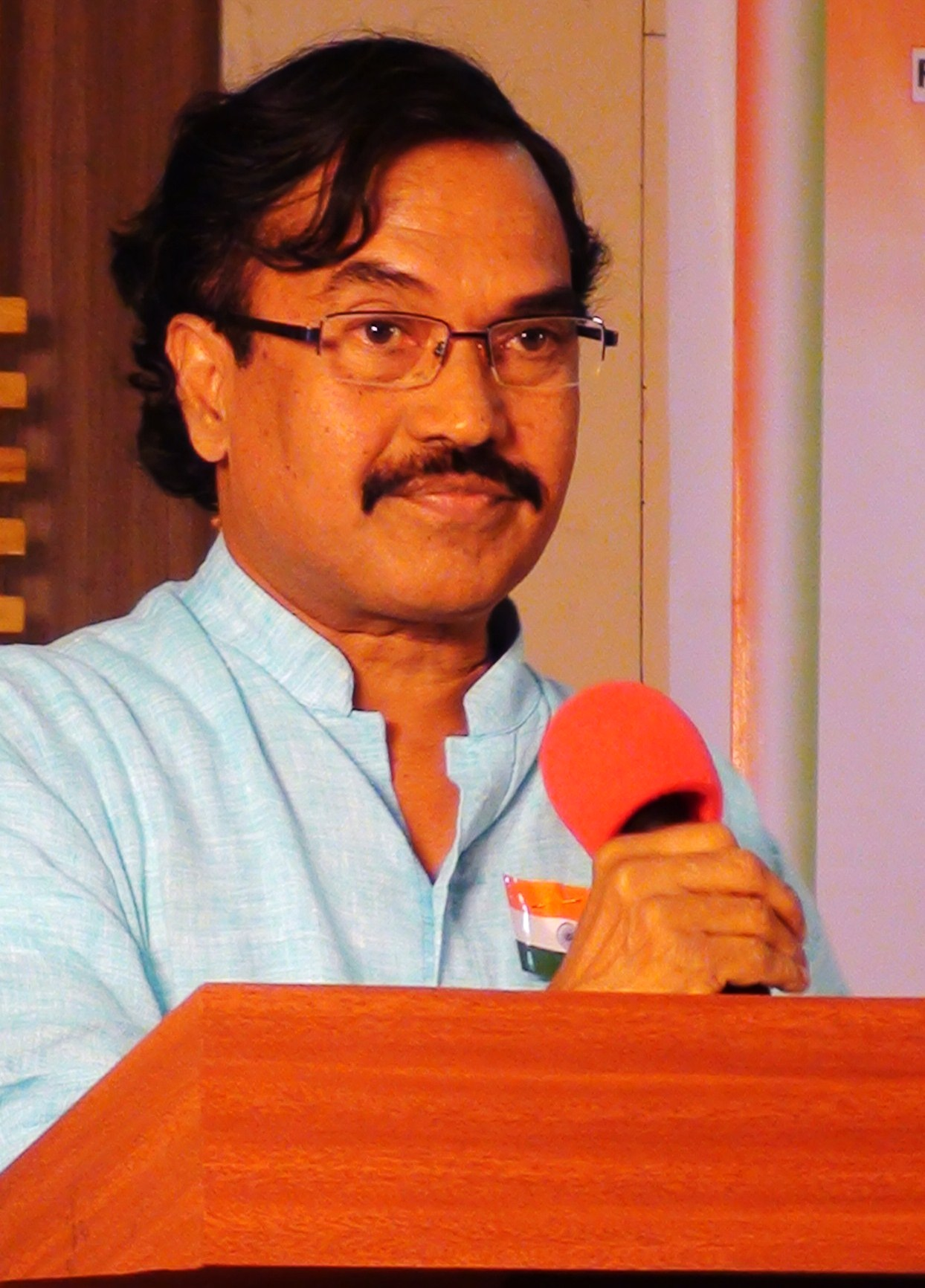
- Teja in 2010
- Born: Gurram Ashok Teja; 16 May 1960 (age 66); Suddala village, Hyderabad State (now Telangana), India
- Occupations: Poet; lyricist
- Spouse: Nirmala
- Father: Suddala Hanmanthu
- Awards: National Film Award for Best Lyrics

Suddala Ashok Teja (born Gurram Ashok Teja; 4 April 1954) is an Indian poet and lyricist known for his work in Telugu cinema and Telugu literature. He has written lyrics for over 2200 songs. He won the National Film Award for Best Lyrics for the song "Nenu saitam" from Tagore (2004).

He was selected as a brand Ambassador of Swachh Bharat, only poet from two Telugu states.

He was awarded with a cash award of ₹1 crore at Telangana Formation Day celebrations in Parade Grounds, Secunderabad on 2 June 2025 for his contributions to the Telangana movement.

== Early life ==
Suddala Ashok Teja was born in Suddala village of Jangaon district, Telangana to Telugu poet Suddala Hanmanthu and his wife Janakamma. Both of his parents took part in the Telangana Rebellion, fighting against the rule of the Nizam of Hyderabad. He has two brothers and a sister; Prabhakar Teja, Sudhakar Teja and Racha Bharathi.

== Career ==
Ashok Teja worked as a government teacher in Bandalingapur, Medipally and Metpally villages of Karimnagar district before coming into the Telugu film industry. He started writing lyrics ever since he was a child. His nephew Uttej a well known character artiste in Telugu films helped him to get a first chance in films. He became popular after penning the lyrics for the films Osey Ramulamma and Ninne Pelladutha during the years 1996–1997.

He won the National Film Award for Best Lyrics in the year 2003 for his song "Nenu Saitham" in the movie Tagore (2003), it is based on Sri Sri's 'Nenu Saitham' from Mahaprasthanam. He is the third writer to win this award after Sri Sri for his "Telugu Veera Levaraa" in Alluri Sitaramaraju and Veturi for his "Raalipoye Puvva Neeku Ragaalenduke" in "Matrudevobhava". He wrote over 2200 songs for 1250 movies and 2500 private songs till 2017.He won SIIMA Award for Best Lyricist (Telugu) in 2018 for "Vachinde" song from Fidaa (2017).

== Personal life ==
Ashok Teja is married to Nirmala. He has daughter Swapna and sons Jwala Chaitanya and Arjun Teja.

== Filmography ==
Year	Film	Song(s)	Notes
1996	Ninne Pelladutha	"Naa Mogudu Rampyari"	
1997	Osey Ramulamma	"Ramasakkani Talli"	
1997	Osey Ramulamma	"Inthi Ee Inti"	
1997	Osey Ramulamma	"Ramulamma Oo Ramulamma"	
1997	Osey Ramulamma	"Pullala Mantivi"	
1997	Encounter	"Yudham Yudha"	
1997	Encounter	"Palle Tellavaarutunnadaa"	
1997	Encounter	"Ooru Vaada Akkallaaraa"	
1998	Raana	"Rampa Chiku"	
1998	Kante Koothurne Kanu		
2000	Sardukupodaam Randi	"Vagalaadi"	
2000	Rayalaseema Ramanna Chowdary	"Buchimallu Buchimallu"	
2000	Rayalaseema Ramanna Chowdary	"Ramanna Ramanna"	
2000	Rayalaseema Ramanna Chowdary	"Yedure Ledinka"	
2000	Sri Srimati Satyabhama	"Meravake Nee"	
2000	Sri Srimati Satyabhama	"Satyabhama"	
2000	Vijayaramaraju	"Evaru Nuvvu"	
2000	Vijayaramaraju	"Adugu Aduguna"	
2000	Uncle	"Uncle Uncle Little Star"	
2000	Uncle	"Gitarai Ne Padanaa"	
2000	Sakutumba Saparivaara Sametam	"Vallantha Tullintha"	
2000	Sakutumba Saparivaara Sametam	"Pachi Venna"	
2000	Sakutumba Saparivaara Sametam	"Manasantha Manasupadi"	
2000	Sakutumba Saparivaara Sametam	"Love Is The Feeling Of Life"	
2000	Sakutumba Saparivaara Sametam	"Anda Chandala"	
2000	Shivani	"Yemandi"	
2000	Chalo Assembly	"Aagadu"	
2001	Murari	"Bangaaru Kalla Buchamma"	
2001	6 Teens	All songs	
2001	Kushi	"Holi Holi"	
2001	Ninnu Choodalani	"Mudda Banthi"	
2001	Jabili	"Pada Pada Nee"	
2001	Jabili	"Jolly Jolly College"	
2001	Jabili	"Ganga Yamuna Godari"	
2001	Jabili	"Chiguraku Yevaro"	
2001	Bhadrachalam	"Okate Jananam Okate Maranam"	
2002	Girl Friend	"Nuvu Yadikelthe Aadikastha Suvarna"	
2002	Manasutho	"Yeppudu Chappudu"	
2002	Jenda	"Isdesh"	
2002	Kubusum	"Nunugu Meesala"	
2002	Kubusum	"Ningikegisinara"	
2002	Kubusum	"Neeli Megahalalo"	
2002	Kubusum	"Indrudu Eetakallu"	
2002	Okato Number Kurraadu	"Nemali Kannodaa"	
2002	Bobby	"Kallallo Draksha Rasam"	
2002	Khadgam	"Aha Allari"	
2003	Pellam Oorelithe	"O Mallepuvvura"	
2003	Fools	"Aaku Chaatu Pindelam"	
2003	Dil	"Tamala Paku Nemali Soku"	
2003	Dhanush	"Malli Malli Nito"	
2003	Charminar	"Bhaj Dekh"	
2003	Tagore	"Nenu Saitham"	
2003	Tagore	"Gappu Chippu"	
2003	Vishnu	"Nee Pere Thana Paina"	
2003	Vishnu	"Ravoyee Chandamama"	
Veede	"Adigadigo Vastunnadu"		
2004	Kaasi	"Ye Marugelaraa O Raghava"	
2004	Kaasi	"Punnami Jabili"	
2004	Kaasi	"Patchi Venna"	
2004	Kaasi	"Marugelaraa O Raghava"	
2004	Kaasi	"Kottu Kottu"	
2004	Kaasi	"Arere Yemaindo"	
2004	Samba	"Kithaikthalu"	
2004	Yagnam	"Thongi Thongi"	
2004	Yagnam	"Emchesavo Na Manasu"	
2004	Yagnam	"Chamak Chamakmani"	
2004	Intlo Srimathi Veedhilo Kumari	"Bhama Neetho"	
2004	Siva Shankar	"Nenemi Chethunu"	
2004	Siva Shankar	"Krishnaa Nuvvu Raaku"	
2004	Apthudu	"Toofan Ayi Nuvvu Ravali Ra"	
2004	Apthudu	"Palle Palleku Untavu Kapala"	
2004	Mr & Mrs Sailaja Krishnamurthy	"Asale Chalikala"	
2004	Leela Mahal Centre	"Sirimalle Puvvalle"	
2004	Leela Mahal Centre	"Paramapavana"	
2004	Leela Mahal Centre	"Galiki Theliyani"	
2004	Leela Mahal Centre	"Chitti Chilakamma"	
2004	Leela Mahal Centre	"Balamanemmo"	
2004	Vijayendra Varma	"Siggu Paparo"	
2004	Vijayendra Varma	"Guntadu Guntadu"	
2004	Vijayendra Varma	"Ningi Kadupunu"	
2005	Bunny	"Mayilu Mayilu"	
2005	Bunny	"Kanapada Leda"	
2005	Chandramukhi	"Chiluka Pada Pada"	Dubbed version
2005	Chandramukhi	"Andala Aakashamantha"	Dubbed version
2005	Ayodhya	"Chodo Chodo"	
2005	Ayodhya	"Jimmu Choodu"	
2005	Subash Chandra Bose	"Subhash Chandra Bose"	
2005	Subash Chandra Bose	"Neredu Pallu"	
2005	Naa Oopiri	"Oka Poovula"	
2005	Naa Oopiri	"Oka Merupe"	
2005	Political Rowdy	"Are Pachi Pachiga"	
2005	Political Rowdy	"Kallu Therichi Choosha"	
2005	That Is Pandu	"Jabilipaina"	
2005	Seenugadu Chiranjeevi Fan	"Ninnemo Paaparo"	
2005	Sree	"Holi Holi"	
2006	Ranam	"Varevva"	
2006	Sri Ramadasu	"Hylessa"	
2006	Sri Krishna 2006	"Jagadeka Veeruniga"	
2006	Hanumanthu	"O Hanumanthu"	
2006	Hanumanthu	"Ramayya Ramayya"	
2006	Asthram	"Undipo Nesthama"	
2006	Himsinche 23va Raju Pulikesi	"Manishiki Yenduku"	Dubbed version
2006	Amma Cheppindi	"Maataltho Swarale"	
2006	Roommates	"Hayire" V1	
2006	Roommates	"Hayire" V2	
2006	Stalin	"Suryude Selavni"	
2006	Raraju	"Bangaru Chilaka"	
2006	Chinnodu	"Hey Manasa"	
2006	Chinnodu	"Ye Mulla Teegallo"	
2006	Sathyam Sivam Sundaram	"Ammo Ammammo"	
2007	Madhumasam	"Oni Merupulu"	
2007	Athili Sattibabu LKG	"Ra Ra Ante"	
2007	Athili Sattibabu LKG	"Ee Chali Galullona"	
2007	Raju Bhai	"Korameenu"	
2007	Bhookailas	"Baava Muripinchana"	
2007	Sivaji: The Boss	"Vaaji Vaaji"	Dubbed version
2007	Sivaji: The Boss	"The Boss"	Dubbed version
2007	Toss	"Yen Chilako"	
2007	Shankar Dada Zindabad	"O Bapu Nuvve Raavaali"	
2007	Chandamama	"Regumullole"	
2007	Evarinaina Eduristha	"Ee Madhu Bala"	
2008	Gautama Buddha	"Vedane"	
2008	Gautama Buddha	"Yeda Yedalo"	
2008	Maisamma IPS	"Maisamma"	
2008	Aatadista	"Style Style"	
2008	Naa Manasukemaindi	"Sakhude Sakhude"	
2008	Pandurangadu	"Hey Krishna Mukunda"	
2008	Pandurangadu	"Matrudevobhava"	
2008	Homam	All songs	
2008	Dongala Bandi	"Oorori Mavayyo"	
2008	Dongala Bandi	"Nelaku Jarene Chandamama"	
2008	Veedu Mamoolodu Kadu	"Kamala Pandu"	
2010	Robo	"Inumulo Oo Hrudayam Molichene", "O Maramanishi"	Dubbed version
2010	Jai Bolo Telangana	"Nijamena"	
2014	Aa Aiduguru	All songs	
2015	Dhee Ante Dhee	"Agnigundam"	
2017	Fidaa	"Vachinde"	
2018	Bewars	"Thalli Thalli"	
2019	Falaknuma Das	"Paye Paye"	
2019	Apple	"Raghavendrudu"	
2019	Apple	"Paila Pachisu Pilla"	
2019	Apple	"Nuvva Nuvva"	
2019	Apple	"Money Money"	
2019	Apple	"Maa Colonylo"	
2020	Palasa 1978	"Kalavathi Kalavathi"	
2021	Radha Krishna	"Nirmala Bomma"	
2021	Love Story	"Saranga Dariya"	
2021	RRR	"Komuram Bheemudo"	
2021	Republic	"Jor Se"	
2022	Rowdy Boys	"Bridhavanam"	
2024	Razakar: The Silent Genocide of Hyderabad	All songs	
2024	Bharatyeedu 2	"Soura"	Dubbed version
2025	Premistunnaa	"Arere"	
2026	Papam Prathap	"Pillekkadundi"	

== Awards ==
- Mahathma Jyothi Phule award
- Telugu University award for Geyalu
- Telugu Adhikara bhasha award
- Vamsi international awards
- Atreya Manaswini Puraskaram
- Cine goers Hyderabad awards
- B.N. Redddy Sahithi puraskaram
- Bharathamuni awards
- NTR Telugu Athmagaurava puraskaram
- Komarambheem National award
- Nagabhairava Koteshwararao award
- Gurajada Vishista Puraskaram
- Sinare Literary Award

== Books ==
=== Telugu ===
- Smruti Geetham
- Velugu Rakalu Novel
- Akupachcha Chandamama
- Bathuku Patalu
- Veera Telangna Yaksha Ganam
- Nelamma Nelamma
- Nemalikannoda
- Sraama Kavyam
- Naa Paatalu
- Nenu Adavini maatlaadutunnaanu

=== English ===
- Suddala Ashokteja lyrics Epic of toil
- I am, the forest, speaking

=== Hindi ===
- Dharthi maa

== Suddala Foundation ==
Suddala Ashok Teja started an international award for social upliftment and folk literature, in memory of his father Suddala Hanumanthu. Awardees over a period of 10 years have included Teejan Bai from Madyapradesh, Ngoogi of America, poet and folk singer Goreti Venkanna, Divyangana poet Rajeshwari of Telangana, and others.
