= Devi Sri Prasad discography =

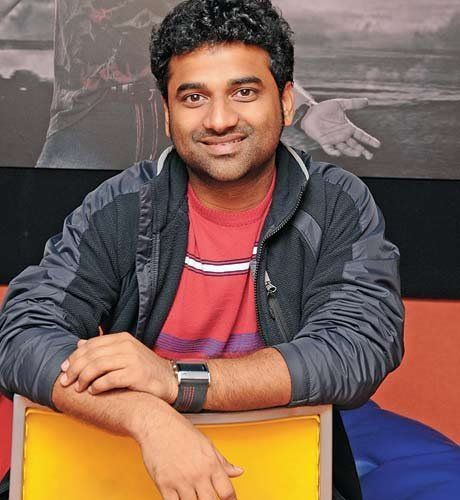

Devi Sri Prasad made his debut in the Indian music industry with the music album Dance Party. He composed score and soundtrack of the 1999 Telugu film Devi, making his debut in the film music industry. Prasad has composed and produced film scores, soundtracks and songs for more than 100 films in various languages, predominantly in Telugu and Tamil languages.

== Original soundtracks ==
Key
†	Denotes films that have not yet been released

Year	Title	Language	Notes
1999	Devi	Telugu	
2001	Navvuthu Bathakalira	Telugu	
2001	Anandam	Telugu	
2002	Priya Nestama	Telugu	One song only.
2002	Kalusukovalani	Telugu	
2002	Sontham	Telugu	
2002	Khadgam	Telugu	
2002	Thotti Gang	Telugu	
2002	Manmadhudu	Telugu	
2003	Inidhu Inidhu Kadhal Inidhu	Tamil	Remake of Anandam.
2003	Ice	Tamil	Remake of Kalusukovalani.
2004	Varsham	Telugu	
2004	Venky	Telugu	
2004	Abhi	Telugu	
2004	Arya	Telugu	
2004	Shankar Dada M.B.B.S.	Telugu	
2004	Mass	Telugu	
2005	Naa Alludu	Telugu	
2005	Nuvvostanante Nenoddantana	Telugu	
2005	Thirupaachi	Tamil	One song only.
2005	Maayavi	Tamil	
2005	Bunny	Telugu	
2005	Sachein	Tamil	
2005	Bhadra	Telugu	
2005	Andarivadu	Telugu	
2005	Oka Oorilo	Telugu	
2005	Mazhai	Tamil	Remake of Varsham.
2005	Aaru	Tamil	
2006	Pournami	Telugu	
2006	Bommarillu	Telugu	
2006	Unakkum Enakkum	Tamil	Remake of Nuvvostanante Nenoddantana.
2006	Rakhi	Telugu	
2007	Jagadam	Telugu	
2007	Aata	Telugu	
2007	Shankar Dada Zindabad	Telugu	
2007	Tulasi	Telugu	
2008	Jalsa	Telugu	
2008	Santosh Subramaniam	Tamil	Remake of Bommarillu.
2008	Ready	Telugu	
2008	Sangama	Kannada	
2008	King	Telugu	
2009	Villu	Tamil	
2009	Current	Telugu	
2009	Kanthaswamy	Tamil	
2009	Arya 2	Telugu	
2010	Adhurs	Telugu	
2010	Kutty	Tamil	Remake of Arya.
2010	Namo Venkatesa	Telugu	
2010	Singam	Tamil	
2010	Sye Aata	Telugu	
2010	Manmadan Ambu	Tamil	
2011	Mr. Perfect	Telugu	
2011	100% Love	Telugu	
2011	Ready	Hindi	One song only.
2011	Venghai	Tamil	
2011	Dhada	Telugu	
2011	Oosaravelli	Telugu	
2012	Gabbar Singh	Telugu	
2012	Maximum	Hindi	One song only.
2012	Julayi	Telugu	
2012	Damarukam	Telugu	
2012	Sarocharu	Telugu	
2013	Alex Pandian	Tamil	
2013	Mirchi	Telugu	
2013	Iddarammayilatho	Telugu	
2013	Singam II	Tamil	
2013	Attarintiki Daredi	Telugu	
2013	Bhai	Telugu	
2014	1: Nenokkadine	Telugu	
2014	Veeram	Tamil	
2014	Yevadu	Telugu	
2014	Jai Ho	Hindi	One song only.
2014	Bramman	Tamil	
2014	Legend	Telugu	
2014	Alludu Seenu	Telugu	
2014	Bindaas	Bengali	One song only.
2015	S/O Satyamurthy	Telugu	
2015	Srimanthudu	Telugu	
2015	Bhaag Johnny	Hindi	One song only.
2015	Puli	Tamil	
2015	Shivam	Telugu	
2015	Kumari 21F	Telugu	
2016	Nenu Sailaja	Telugu	
2016	Nannaku Prematho	Telugu	
2016	Sardaar Gabbar Singh	Telugu	
2016	Janatha Garage	Telugu	
2017	Khaidi No. 150	Telugu	
2017	Nenu Local	Telugu	
2017	Rarandoi Veduka Chudham	Telugu	
2017	DJ: Duvvada Jagannadham	Telugu	
2017	Jaya Janaki Nayaka	Telugu	
2017	Jai Lava Kusa	Telugu	
2017	Vunnadhi Okate Zindagi	Telugu	
2017	Middle Class Abbayi	Telugu	
2018	Rangasthalam	Telugu	
2018	Bharat Ane Nenu	Telugu	
2018	Saamy Square	Tamil	
2018	Hello Guru Prema Kosame	Telugu	
2019	Vinaya Vidheya Rama	Telugu	
2019	F2: Fun and Frustration	Telugu	
2019	Chitralahari	Telugu	
2019	Maharshi	Telugu	
2020	Sarileru Neekevvaru	Telugu	
2021	Alludu Adhurs	Telugu	
2021	Uppena	Telugu	
2021	Rang De	Telugu	
2021	Radhe	Hindi	One song only.
2021	Pushpa: The Rise	Telugu	
2022	Rowdy Boys	Telugu	
2022	Good Luck Sakhi	Telugu	
2022	Khiladi	Telugu	
2022	Aadavallu Meeku Johaarlu	Telugu	
2022	F3	Telugu	
2022	The Warriorr	Telugu; Tamil	
2022	Ranga Ranga Vaibhavanga	Telugu	
2022	Drishyam 2	Hindi	
2022	Cirkus	Hindi	One song only.
2023	Waltair Veerayya	Telugu	
2023	Kisi Ka Bhai Kisi Ki Jaan	Hindi	One song only.
2024	Rathnam	Tamil	
2024	Kanguva	Tamil	
2024	Pushpa 2: The Rule	Telugu	
2025	Thandel	Telugu	
2025	Kuberaa	Telugu; Tamil	
2025	Junior	Telugu; Kannada	
2026	Ustaad Bhagat Singh	Telugu	
2026	Sing Geetham	Telugu	
2026	King 100	Telugu	

== Original scores ==
Year	Title	Language
1999	Devi	Telugu
2001	Navvuthu Bathakalira	Telugu
2001	Badri	Tamil
2001	Anandam	Telugu
2002	Kalusukovalani	Telugu
2002	Sontham	Telugu
2002	Khadgam	Telugu
2002	Manmadhudu	Telugu
2002	Thotti Gang	Telugu
2003		Telugu
2003	Inidhu Inidhu Kadhal Inidhu	Tamil
2003	Ice	Tamil
2004	Venky	Telugu
2004	Abhi	Telugu
2004	Varsham	Telugu
2004	Arya	Telugu
2004	Shankar Dada M.B.B.S.	Telugu
2004	Mass	Telugu
2005	Naa Alludu	Telugu
2005	Nuvvostanante Nenoddantana	Telugu
2005	Maayavi	Tamil
2005	Bunny	Telugu
2005	Sachein	Tamil
2005	Bhadra	Telugu
2005	Andarivaadu	Telugu
2005	Oka Oorilo	Telugu
2005	Mazhai	Tamil
2005	Aaru	Tamil
2006	Pournami	Telugu
2006	Bommarillu	Telugu
2006	Unakkum Enakkum	Tamil
2006	Rakhi	Telugu
2007	Jagadam	Telugu
2007	Aata	Telugu
2007	Shankar Dada Zindabad	Telugu
2007	Tulasi	Telugu
2008	Jalsa	Telugu
2008	Santosh Subramaniam	Tamil
2008	Ready	Telugu
2008	Dasavathaaram	Tamil
2008	King	Telugu
2008	Sangama	Kannada
2009	Current	Telugu
2009	Villu	Tamil
2009	Kanthaswamy	Tamil
2009	Arya 2	Telugu
2010	Adhurs	Telugu
2010	Namo Venkatesa	Telugu
2010	Kutty	Tamil
2010	Singam	Tamil
2010	Sye Aata	Telugu
2010	Manmadan Ambu	Tamil
2011	Mr. Perfect	Telugu
2011	100% Love	Telugu
2011	Venghai	Tamil
2011	Dhada	Telugu
2011	Oosaravelli	Telugu
2012	Gabbar Singh	Telugu
2012	Julayi	Telugu
2012	Damarukam	Telugu
2012	Sarocharu	Telugu
2013	Alex Pandian	Tamil
2013	Mirchi	Telugu
2013	Iddarammayilatho	Telugu
2013	Singam II	Tamil
2013	Attarintiki Daredi	Telugu
2013	Bhai	Telugu
2014	1: Nenokkadine	Telugu
2014	Veeram	Tamil
2014	Yevadu	Telugu
2014	Bramman	Tamil
2014	Legend	Telugu
2014	Alludu Seenu	Telugu
2015	S/O Satyamurthy	Telugu
2015	Srimanthudu	Telugu
2015	Puli	Tamil
2015	Shivam	Telugu
2015	Kumari 21F	Telugu
2016	Nenu Sailaja	Telugu
2016	Nannaku Prematho	Telugu
2016	Sardaar Gabbar Singh	Telugu
2016	Janatha Garage	Telugu
2017	Khaidi No. 150	Telugu
2017	Nenu Local	Telugu
2017	Rarandoi Veduka Chudham	Telugu
2017	DJ: Duvvada Jagannadham	Telugu
2017	Jaya Janaki Nayaka	Telugu
2017	Jai Lava Kusa	Telugu
2017	Vunnadhi Okate Zindagi	Telugu
2017	Middle Class Abbayi	Telugu
2018	Rangasthalam	Telugu
2018	Bharat Ane Nenu	Telugu
2018	Saamy Square	Tamil
2018	Hello Guru Prema Kosame	Telugu
2019	Vinaya Vidheya Rama	Telugu
2019	F2: Fun and Frustration	Telugu
2019	Chitralahari	Telugu
2019	Maharshi	Telugu
2020	Sarileru Neekevvaru	Telugu
2021	Alludu Adhurs	Telugu
2021	Uppena	Telugu
2021	Rang De	Telugu
2021	Pushpa: The Rise	Telugu
2022	Rowdy Boys	Telugu
2022	Good Luck Sakhi	Telugu
2022	Khiladi	Telugu
2022	Aadavallu Meeku Johaarlu	Telugu
2022	F3	Telugu
2022	The Warriorr	Telugu; Tamil
2022	Ranga Ranga Vaibhavanga	Telugu
2022	Drishyam 2	Hindi
2023	Waltair Veerayya	Telugu
2024	Rathnam	Tamil
2024	Kanguva	Tamil
2024	Pushpa 2: The Rule	Telugu
2025	Thandel	Telugu
2025	Kuberaa	Telugu; Tamil
2025	Junior	Telugu; Kannada
2026	Sing Geetham	Telugu
2027	Karthi30 †	Tamil

== As playback singer ==
Year	Song(s)	Work	Composer(s)	Co-singer(s)	Lyrics	Language	Notes	Ref
1999	"Neevu Leka"	Prema Kosam	Raj		Sirivennela Seetharama Sastry	Telugu		
2000	"Aata Kaavala" (rap portions)	Annayya	Mani Sharma	Sukhwinder Singh	Bhuvanachandra	Telugu		
2000	"Jagada Jagada"	Yuvakudu	Mani Sharma		Veturi	Telugu		
2001	"Din Din Thara"	Navvuthu Bathakalira	Devi Sri Prasad	Murali	Sirivennela Sitarama Sastry	Telugu		
2001	"Angel Vandhaale"	Badri	Ramana Gogula	Chithra	Palani Bharathi	Tamil		
2001	"King of Chennai"	Badri	Ramana Gogula	—	Palani Bharathi	Tamil		
2001	"Oh Papa"	Repallelo Radha	Koti	Chithra	Veturi	Telugu		
2001	"Vennello Aadapilla"	Akasa Veedhilo	M. M. Keeravani	Ganga	Chandrabose	Telugu		
2001	"Monalisa"	Anandam	Devi Sri Prasad	Kalpana	Bhuvanachandra	Telugu		
2001	"Premante Emitante"	Anandam	Devi Sri Prasad	Mallikarjun, Sumangali	Devi Sri Prasad	Telugu		
2002	"Udayinchina"	Kalusukovalani	Devi Sri Prasad	—	Devi Sri Prasad	Telugu		
2002	"Cheliya Cheliya"	Kalusukovalani	Devi Sri Prasad	Kalpana	Kulasekhar	Telugu		
2002	"Govinda Govinda"	Khadgam	Devi Sri Prasad	Sri	Sirivennela Sitarama Sastry	Telugu		
2002	"Andhamaina Bhamalu"	Manmadhudu	Devi Sri Prasad	—	Bhuvanachandra	Telugu		
2002	"Gundello Nuvve"	Thotti Gang	Devi Sri Prasad	Febi		Telugu		
2002	"Naayudo Naayudo"	Sontham	Devi Sri Prasad	—	Kulasekhar	Telugu		
2003	"Lovena"	Inidhu Inidhu Kadhal Inidhu	Devi Sri Prasad	—	Vairamuthu	Tamil		
2003	"Iddaru Kalisi"	Jodi No. 1	Vandemataram Srinivas	—	Chandrabose	Telugu		
2004	"Pantham Pantham"	Sye	M. M. Keeravani	—	Chandrabose	Telugu		
2004	"Mayilu Mayilu"	Bunny	Devi Sri Prasad	—	Suddala Ashok Teja	Telugu		
2004	"Thathai Thathai"	Manmadha (D)	Yuvan Shankar Raja	Clinton Cerejo, Kalpana, Vasundhara Das	Vennelakanti	Telugu		
2005	"Chandrulo Unde"	Nuvvostanante Nenoddantana	Devi Sri Prasad	Shankar Mahadevan, Kalpana	Sirivennela Seetharama Sastry	Telugu		
2005	"Ghal Ghal (Akasam Thakela)"	Nuvvostanante Nenoddantana	Devi Sri Prasad	S. P. Balasubrahmanyam	Sirivennela Seetharama Sastry	Telugu		
2005	"Adhire Adhire"	Nuvvostanante Nenoddantana	Devi Sri Prasad	Jassie Gift	Sirivennela Seetharama Sastry	Telugu		
2005	"Kanmoodi Thirakumbothu"	Sachein	Devi Sri Prasad	—	Na. Muthukumar	Tamil		
2005	"Chindulese"	Oka Oorilo	Devi Sri Prasad	—	Ananta Sriram	Telugu		
2006	"Kaani Ippudu"	Bommarillu	Devi Sri Prasad	—	Bhaskarabhatla	Telugu		
2006	"Rakhi Rakhi"	Rakhi	Devi Sri Prasad	Mamta Mohandas	Sirivennela Sitarama Sastry	Telugu		
2006	"Heylessa"	Sri Ramadasu	M. M. Keeravani	M. M. Keeravani, Malavika	Suddala Ashok Teja	Telugu		
2007	"Manakakkarledu"	Okkadunnadu	M. M. Keeravani	—	Ananta Sriram	Telugu		
2007	"Jagadeka Veerudiki"	Shankar Dada Zindabad	Devi Sri Prasad	Mano, Chiranjeevi, Srikanth	Chandrabose	Telugu		
2007	"O Bapu Nuvve Raavaali"	Shankar Dada Zindabad	Devi Sri Prasad	Sagar	Suddala Ashok Teja	Telugu		
2007	"Good Morning Hyderabad" (Devi Mix)	Shankar Dada Zindabad	Devi Sri Prasad	—	Devi Sri Prasad	Telugu		
2007	"Hello Boys"	Tulasi	Devi Sri Prasad	—	Chandrabose	Telugu		
2007	"Ne Chuk Chuk Bandini (Raja Raja Bobbili Raja)"	Tulasi	Devi Sri Prasad	Malgudi Subha	Sahithi	Telugu		
2008	"You And I"	Jalsa	Devi Sri Prasad	—	Sirivennela Sitarama Sastry	Telugu		
2008	"Chalore Chalore Chal (Hindi)"	Jalsa	Devi Sri Prasad	—	Raqueeb Alam	Telugu		
2008	"Kaadhalukku Kangal Illai"	Santosh Subramaniam	Devi Sri Prasad	—	Kavivarman	Tamil		
2008	"Dil Maange More"	Sangama	Devi Sri Prasad	—	Kaviraj	Kannada		
2009	"You Are My Love Story"	Current	Devi Sri Prasad	—	Bhaskarabhatla			
2009	"Jalsa"	Villu	Devi Sri Prasad	Baba Sehgal, Rita Thyagarajan	Rohini	Tamil		
2009	"Jalsa Jalsa" (Remix)	Villu	Devi Sri Prasad	Baba Sehgal, Rita Thyagarajan	Rohini	Tamil		
2009	"Dheemtanakka"	Villu	Devi Sri Prasad	Divya	Snehan	Tamil		
2009	"Kanthasamy"	Kanthaswamy	Devi Sri Prasad	—	Viveka	Tamil		
2009	"Kanthaswamy" (DSP mix)	Kanthaswamy	Devi Sri Prasad	—	Viveka	Tamil		
2009	"Kanthasamy"	Kanthaswamy	Devi Sri Prasad	—	Sahithi	Telugu		
2009	"Kanthaswamy" (DSP mix)	Kanthaswamy	Devi Sri Prasad	—	Sahithi	Telugu		
2009	"Mr. Perfect"	Arya 2	Devi Sri Prasad	Baba Sehgal, Rita, Sachin Tyler Sadachcharan	Kedarnath Parimi	Telugu		
2009	"Baby He Loves You"	Arya 2	Devi Sri Prasad	—	Chandrabose	Telugu		
2009	"Mr. Perfect"	Arya 2	Devi Sri Prasad	Anwar Sadath	Siju Thuravoor	Malayalam	Dubbed version	
2009	"Whistle Kottu"	Kasko	Premgi Amaren	Surmukhi Raman		Telugu		
2010	"Shiva Sambho"	Adhurs	Devi Sri Prasad	—	Chandrabose			
2010	"Life, A Jaali Than"	Kutty	Devi Sri Prasad	—	Viveka	Tamil		
2010	"Singam"	Singam	Devi Sri Prasad	—	Na. Muthukumar, Megha	Tamil		
2010	"Kullu Pudithe"	Villain	A. R. Rahman	Bamba Bakya, Tanvi Shah, SuVi, Shubha, Naresh Iyer, Sangeetha	Veturi	Telugu	Dubbed version	
2010	"Manmadhan Ambu"	Manmadan Ambu	Devi Sri Prasad	—	Kamal Haasan	Tamil		
2010	"Manmadha Baanam"	Manmadan Baanam	Devi Sri Prasad	—	Ramajogayya Sastry	Telugu		
2011	"A Square B Square"	100% Love	Devi Sri Prasad	Swathi Reddy	Chandrabose	Telugu		
2011	"Enna Solla Pora"	Sabash Sariyana Potti	Devi Sri Prasad	Sagar	Vineeth Sreenivasan	Tamil		
2011	"Plus Plus"	Venghai	Devi Sri Prasad	M. L. R. Karthikeyan	Hari	Tamil		
2011	"Brathakali"	Oosaravelli	Devi Sri Prasad	—	Chandrabose	Telugu		
2012	"Pakdo Pakdo"	Julai	Devi Sri Prasad	Malgudi Subha	Ramajogayya Sastry	Telugu		
2012	"Made For Each Other"	Sarocharu	Devi Sri Prasad	—	Ramajogayya Sastry	Telugu		
2013	"Kidnap Raja"	Alex Pandian	Devi Sri Prasad	Anitha Karthikeyan	Ramajogayya Sastry	Telugu		
2013	"Naalu Pakkam"	Alex Pandian	Devi Sri Prasad	Anitha Karthikeyan	Viveka	Tamil		
2013	"Darlingey"	Mirchi	Devi Sri Prasad	Geetha Madhuri	Ramajogayya Sastry	Telugu		
2013	"Run Run (Remix)"	Iddarammayilatho	Devi Sri Prasad	Apache Indian, Sharmila	Ramajogayya Sastry	Telugu		
2013	"Achamillai"	Singam II	Devi Sri Prasad	S.S. Thaman, Benny Dayal	Viveka	Tamil		
2013	"Singam Dance"	Singam II	Devi Sri Prasad	Baba Sehgal, Sharmila, Geetha Madhuri	Viveka	Tamil		
2013	"Simham Simham"	Yamudu 2: Singam	Devi Sri Prasad	S. Thaman		Telugu		
2013	"Ninnu Chudagane"	Attarintiki Daredi	Devi Sri Prasad	—	Devi Sri Prasad	Telugu		
2013	"Who Are You"	1: Nenokkadine	Devi Sri Prasad	—	Chandrabose	Telugu		
2013	"You are My Love"	1: Nenokkadine	Devi Sri Prasad	Piyush Kapoor	Chandrabose	Telugu		
2013	"You are My Love"	1: Nenokkadine	Devi Sri Prasad	—		Tamil		
2014	"Nallavannu Solvaanga"	Veeram	Devi Sri Prasad	—	Viveka	Tamil		
2014	"En Uyirin Uyiraga"	Bramman	Devi Sri Prasad	Anitha Karthikeyan	Viveka	Tamil		
2014	"Whatsapp Antu"	Alludu Seenu	Devi Sri Prasad	Sharmila	Ramajogayya Sastry, Sharmila	Telugu		
2015	"Super Machi"	S/O Satyamurthy	Devi Sri Prasad	Sravana Bhargavi, Magizhini Manimaaran	Devi Sri Prasad	Telugu		
2015	"Bang Bang Bangkok"	Kumari 21F	Devi Sri Prasad	Ranina Reddy, Rita	Devi Sri Prasad	Telugu		
2015	"Daddy Mummy"	Bhaag Johnny	Devi Sri Prasad	M. M. Manasi	Kumaar	Hindi		
2016	"Naa Manasu Neelo"	Nannaku Prematho	Devi Sri Prasad	Sharmila	Bhaskarabhatla	Telugu		
2016	"Nannaku Prematho"	Nannaku Prematho	Devi Sri Prasad	Sagar	Devi Sri Prasad	Telugu		
2017	"Ammadu Let's Do Kummudu"	Khaidi No. 150	Devi Sri Prasad	Ranina Reddy	Devi Sri Prasad	Telugu		
2017	"Trendu Maarina"	Vunnadhi Okate Zindagi	Devi Sri Prasad	—	Chandrabose	Telugu		
2017	"What Amma What is This Amma"	Vunnadhi Okate Zindagi	Devi Sri Prasad	—	Sri Mani	Telugu		
2017	"Vunnadhi Okate Zindagi" (film version)	Vunnadhi Okate Zindagi	Devi Sri Prasad	Sagar	Sri Mani	Telugu		
2018	"Yentha Sakkagunnave"	Rangasthalam	Devi Sri Prasad	—	Chandrabose	Telugu		
2018	"Aa Gattununtava" (film version)	Rangasthalam	Devi Sri Prasad	—	Chandrabose	Telugu		
2019	"Ek Baar"	Vinaya Vidheya Rama	Devi Sri Prasad	Ranina Reddy	Sri Mani	Telugu		
2019	"Entho Fun"	F2: Fun and Frustration	Devi Sri Prasad	—	Sri Mani	Telugu		
2019	"Choti Choti Baatein"	Maharshi	Devi Sri Prasad	—	Sri Mani	Telugu		
2020	"Eswara"	Uppena	Devi Sri Prasad	—	Chandrabose	Telugu		
2021	"Attasudake"	Khiladi	Devi Sri Prasad	Sameera Bharadwaj	Sri Mani	Telugu		
2022	"Okariki Okarani"	Rowdy Boys	Devi Sri Prasad	—	Krishna Kanth	Telugu		
2022	"Aadavallu Meeku Johaarlu"	Aadavallu Meeku Johaarlu	Devi Sri Prasad	—	Sri Mani	Telugu		
2023	"Boss Party"	Waltair Veerayya	Devi Sri Prasad	Nakash Aziz, Haripriya	Devi Sri Prasad	Telugu		
2023	"Lets Dance Chotu Motu"	Kisi Ka Bhai Kisi Ki Jaan	Devi Sri Prasad	Salman Khan, Yo Yo Honey Singh, Neha Bhasin	Devi Sri Prasad	Hindi		
2024	"Don't Worry Da Machi"	Rathnam	Devi Sri Prasad	—	Viveka	Tamil		
2024	"Don’t Worry Ra Chiccha"	Rathnam	Devi Sri Prasad	—	Sri Mani	Telugu	Dubbed version	
2024	"Yolo"	Kanguva	Devi Sri Prasad	Lavita Lobo	Viveka	Tamil		
2024	"Yolo"	Kanguva	Devi Sri Prasad	Sagar, Shraddha Das	Rakendu Mouli	Telugu	Dubbed version	
2024	"Yolo"	Kanguva	Devi Sri Prasad	Shilpa Rao	Mellow D	Hindi	Dubbed version	
2024	"Yolo"	Kanguva	Devi Sri Prasad	Yazin Nizar, Alex	Mankombu Gopalakrishnan	Malayalam	Dubbed version	
2024	"Yolo"	Kanguva	Devi Sri Prasad	Nakul Abhyankar, Ranina Reddy	Varadaraj Chikkaballapura	Kannada	Dubbed version	
2025	"Shankara"	Kuberaa	Devi Sri Prasad		Kalyan Chakravarthy	Telugu		

== As lyricist ==
Year	Song(s)	Work	Composer(s)	Language	Ref
2023	"Boss Party"	Waltair Veerayya	Devi Sri Prasad	Telugu	
2023	"Sridevi Chiranjeevi"	Waltair Veerayya	Devi Sri Prasad	Telugu	

== Singles ==
Title	Year	Album	Lyrics	Language	Ref.
"Ey! Unnada"	1998	Mr. Devi	DSP, Shyam Sunder	Tamil	
"Ey! Nee Andam"	1999	Mr. Devi	DSP, Shyam Sunder	Telugu	
"Gurave Namaha" (featuring Rita Thyagarajan)	2017	Non-album single	Jonnavittula Ramalingeswara Rao	Telugu	
"O Pari"	2022	Non-album single	Raqueeb Alam	Hindi	
"O Pilla"	2022	Non-album single	DSP	Telugu	
"O Penne"	2022	Non-album single	DSP	Tamil	

== Other songs ==
List of other songs
Title	Year	Language	Album
"Arivum Anbum"	2020	Tamil	Non-album single
"Har Ghar Tiranga"	2022	Hindi	Non-album single

== Albums ==
=== Studio albums ===
Title	Album details	Tracks	Language
Dance Party (Note: Released digitally on 20 September 2017 through Sony Music India as "Dance Party Vol. 2")	Released: 12 March 1997; Label: Magnasound Records; Format: CD	Track list: 1. Aye Unnoda; 1 out of 8 tracks	Tamil
Mr. Devi (Tamil)	Released: 28 September 1998; Label: Magnasound Records; Format: CD, digital download	Track list: 1. Nee Illamal (5:40); 2. Tension Tension (3:32); 3. Adada Niladi (4:04); 4. Pichai Rap (4:04); 5. Vaa Azhage (5:13); 6. Adada Kanne (4:51); 7. Adi Ennai (Nagin) (4:48); 8. Ey! Unnada (3:50)	Tamil
Mr. Devi (Telugu)	Released: 12 March 1999; Label: Magnasound Records; Format: CD, digital download	Track list: 1. Introduction (0:27); 2. Neevu Leka (5:35); 3. Tension Tension (3:46); 4. Hello Sundari (3:39); 5. Nannu Choodu (4:03); 6. Amma Aakali (4:12); 7. Raa Cheliya (5:03); 8. Arerere Pilla (3:54); 9. Ey! Nee Andam (5:40)	Telugu

== Reused tunes ==
Original version				Remade version				Notes	Ref.
Year	Film/Album	Song	Language	Year	Film/Album	Song	Language	Notes	Ref.
1997	Dance Party	"Aye Unnoda"	Tamil	1998	Mr. Devi	"Ey! Unnada"	Tamil		
1997	Dance Party	"Aye Unnoda"	Tamil	1999	Mr. Devi	"Ey! Nee Andam"	Telugu		
1998	Mr. Devi	"Nee Illamal"	Tamil	1999	Mr. Devi	"Neevu Leka"	Telugu	Remake album	
1998	Mr. Devi	"Tension Tension"	Tamil	1999	Mr. Devi	"Tension Tension"	Telugu	Remake album	
1998	Mr. Devi	"Adada Niladi"	Tamil	1999	Mr. Devi	"Arerere Pilla"	Telugu	Remake album	
1998	Mr. Devi	"Pichai Rap"	Tamil	1999	Mr. Devi	"Amma Aakali"	Telugu	Remake album	
1998	Mr. Devi	"Vaa Azhage"	Tamil	1999	Mr. Devi	"Raa Cheliya"	Telugu	Remake album	
1998	Mr. Devi	"Adi Ennai (Nagin)"	Tamil	1999	Mr. Devi	"Nannu Choodu"	Telugu	Remake album	
2001	Anandam	"Kanulu Terichinna"	Telugu	2003	Inidhu Inidhu Kadhal Inidhu	"Kadhal Enbathu"	Tamil	Remake films	
2001	Anandam	"Premante Emitante"	Telugu	2003	Inidhu Inidhu Kadhal Inidhu	"Lovvunna Enna"	Tamil	Remake films	
2001	Anandam	"Oka Merupu"	Telugu	2003	Inidhu Inidhu Kadhal Inidhu	"Naan Putham Puthiya"	Tamil	Remake films	
2001	Anandam	"Evarina Epudaina" (Male)	Telugu	2003	Inidhu Inidhu Kadhal Inidhu	"Siragulla II"	Tamil	Remake films	
2001	Anandam	"Evarina Epudaina" (Female)	Telugu	2003	Inidhu Inidhu Kadhal Inidhu	"Siragulla I"	Tamil	Remake films	
2002	Kalusukovalani	"Udayinchina"	Telugu	2003	Ice	"En Vanathin"	Tamil	Remake films	
2002	Kalusukovalani	"Pade Pade"	Telugu	2003	Ice	"Nenjil Nenjil"	Tamil	Remake films	
2002	Kalusukovalani	"Oke Okka Kshanam"	Telugu	2003	Ice	"Ore Oru Ganam"	Tamil	Remake films	
2002	Kalusukovalani	"Cheliya Cheliya"	Telugu	2003	Ice	"Silaya Silaya"	Tamil	Remake films	
2002	Sontham	"Eppudo (Female)" / "Eppudo"	Telugu	2005	Maayavi	"Kadavul Thandha"	Tamil		
2004	Varsham	"Nuvvosthanante"	Telugu	2005	Mazhai	"Nee Varumbodhu"	Tamil	Remake film	
2004	Varsham	"Mellaga"	Telugu	2005	Mazhai	"Mannile"	Tamil	Remake film	
2004	Varsham	"Nachave Nizam Pori"	Telugu	2005	Mazhai	"Isthanbul"	Tamil	Remake film	
2004	Varsham	"Langa Voni"	Telugu	2005	Mazhai	"Thappe Illai"	Tamil	Remake film	
2004	Varsham	"Neeti Mullai"	Telugu	2005	Mazhai	"Muthu Mazhaiye"	Tamil	Remake film	
2004	Venky	"Gongoora Thotakada"	Telugu	2005	Maayavi	"Kaathadi Pole"	Tamil		
2004	Venky	"Silakemo"	Telugu	2005	Maayavi	"Tamizh Naattil"	Tamil		
2004	Abhi	"Vangathota"	Telugu	2005	Sachein	"Gundu Manga Thoppukulle"	Tamil		
2004	Arya	"Edo Priya Ragam Vintunna"	Telugu	2010	Kutty	"Yaaro En Nenjai"	Tamil	Remake film	
2004	Arya	"Feel My Love"	Telugu	2010	Kutty	"Feel My Love"	Tamil	Remake film	
2004	Arya	"Aa Ante Amalapuram"	Telugu	2012	Maximum	"Aa Ante Amalapuram"	Hindi		
2004	Shankar Dada M.B.B.S	"Pattu Pattu"	Telugu	2005	Thirupaachi	"Kattu Kattu"	Tamil		
2005	Naa Alludu	"Kandhi Chenu Kada"	Telugu	2005	Mazhai	"Kuchi Karuvadu"	Tamil		
2005	Nuvvostanante Nenoddantana	"Chandrullo Unde"	Telugu	2005	Unakkum Enakkum	"Pooparikka Neeyum"	Tamil	Remake film	
2005	Nuvvostanante Nenoddantana	"Something Something"	Telugu	2005	Unakkum Enakkum	"Something Something"	Tamil	Remake film	
2005	Nuvvostanante Nenoddantana	"Niluvaddam"	Telugu	2005	Unakkum Enakkum	"Un Paarvaiyil"	Tamil	Remake film	
2005	Nuvvostanante Nenoddantana	"Ghal Ghal"	Telugu	2005	Unakkum Enakkum	"Aagayam"	Tamil	Remake film	
2005	Nuvvostanante Nenoddantana	"Adhire Adhire"	Telugu	2005	Unakkum Enakkum	"Kiliye Kiliye"	Tamil	Remake film	
2005	Bunny	"Maro Maro"	Telugu	2005	Sachein	"Va Va Va En Thalaiva"	Tamil	2 lines only (Note: The lyrics "Maro Maro Goli Maro, Yaro Yaro Sun Yaro" were reused.)	
2005	Maayavi	"Oru Dhevaloga Raani"	Tamil	2005	Oka Oorilo	"Chandamama Okati"	Telugu		
2006	Bommarillu	"We Have a Romeo"	Telugu	2008	Santosh Subramaniam	"Senthamizh Pesum Azhagu Juliet"	Tamil	Remake film	
2006	Bommarillu	"Kaani Ippudu"	Telugu	2008	Santosh Subramaniam	"Kadhaluku Kanngal Illai"	Tamil	Remake film	
2006	Bommarillu	"Laloo Darwaja"	Telugu	2008	Santosh Subramaniam	"America Yendralum Aandipatti Yendralum"	Tamil	Remake film	
2006	Bommarillu	"Nammaka Thappani"	Telugu	2008	Santosh Subramaniam	"Uyire Uyire Piriyadhey"	Tamil	Remake film	
2006	Bommarillu	"Appudo Ippudo"	Telugu	2008	Santosh Subramaniam	"Adada Adada Adada"	Tamil	Remake film	
2006	Bommarillu	"Bommarillu (Music Bit)"	Telugu	2008	Santosh Subramaniam	"Love Theme"	Tamil	Remake film	
2006	Unakkum Enakkum	"Kozhi Veda Kozhi"	Tamil	2010	Adhurs	"Assalaam Valekum"	Telugu		
2007	Shankar Dada Zindabad	"Akalesthey"	Telugu	2009	Villu	"Daddy Mummy"	Tamil		
2007	Shankar Dada Zindabad	"Akalesthey"	Telugu	2015	Bhaag Johnny	"Daddy Mummy"	Hindi		
2008	Jalsa	"Jalsa"	Telugu	2009	Villu	"Jalsa Jalsa"	Tamil		
2008	Ready	"Om Namaste Bolo"	Telugu	2009	Villu	"Dheemthanakka Thillana"	Tamil		
2008	Sangama	"Dil Maange More"	Kannada	2010	Kutty	"Lifey Jollyda"	Tamil		
2008	Sangama	"Sangama"	Kannada	2008	King	"O Manmadhuda"	Telugu		
2008	King	"Yenthapani Chestiviro"	Telugu	2010	Kutty	"Kannu Rendum"	Tamil		
2009	Arya 2	"Ringa Ringa"	Telugu	2010	Ready	"Dhinka Chika"	Hindi		
2011	Venghai	"Pudikale Pudikudhu"	Tamil	2011	Oosaravelli	"Dandiya India"	Telugu		
2013	Mirchi	"Pandagala"	Telugu	2014	Bindaas	"Ajke Ei Khushir Dine"	Bengali		
2017	DJ: Duvvada Jagannadham	"Seeti Maar"	Telugu	2021	Radhe	"Seeti Maar"	Hindi		
