= Cameraman Gangatho Rambabu (soundtrack) =

- Soundtrack album disc cover

Soundtrack album by Mani Sharma
- Released: 2 October 2012
- Recorded: 2012
- Genre: Film soundtrack
- Length: 21:31
- Language: Telugu
- Label: Aditya Music
- Producer: Mani Sharma

Mani Sharma chronology
Rachcha (2012)	Cameraman Gangatho Rambabu (2012)	Krishnam Vande Jagadgurum (2012)

Cameraman Gangatho Rambabu is the soundtrack of the 2012 political action film of the same name directed by Puri Jagannadh starring Pawan Kalyan, Tamannaah Bhatia, Prakash Raj, and Kota Srinivasa Rao in the lead roles. The soundtrack is composed by Mani Sharma who marks his fourth collaboration with Jagannath and Kalyan. All lyrics were penned by Bhaskarabhatla Ravikumar while Hemachandra, Karunya, Geetha Madhuri, Sravana Bhargavi, Chaitra, Khushi Murali, Narendra and Sri Krishna crooned for the film for 6 tracks which also included a special song named "Power Song" composed, written and crooned by rapper Baba Sehgal as a tribute to Kalyan. The audio was released through Aditya Music Label directly into the stores on 2 October 2012. The audio received positive response.

== Track list ==
All tracks are written by Bhaskarabhatla Ravi Kumar.

No.	Title	Singer(s)	Length
1.	"Theme Song"	Hemachandra, Karunya, Narendra	1:53
2.	"Pillani Chuste"	Karunya, Ranjith, Sravana Bhargavi	5:03
3.	"Joramochindhi"	Khushi Murali, Sravana Bhargavi	3:38
4.	"Extraordinary"	Hemachandra	4:24
5.	"Taladinchuku"	Hemachandra, Karunya, Sri Krishna, Narendra	3:12
6.	"Melikalu"	Narendra, Geetha Madhuri, Rahul Sipligunj	4:21
Total length:			21:31

== Reception ==
The album received positive response from critics. Musicperk.com wrote "Mani Sharma has gone in for grandeur with the use of nine singers. This one is a mass entertainer at best from Mani Sharma although he has not covered every genre of music. Credit definitely does to Bhaskar Bhatla for some entertaining words. He has penned words uniquely for each of the song that would fit exactly to the mood and the feel of that particular song. Mani has done a good job in the choice of the right singers for the respective songs who have breathed life into them. Singers like Geetha Madhuri, Chaitra, Narendra, Sravana Bhargavi and Hemachandra create magic with their respective songs" and gave the verdict as "Worth a listen for the lyrics and the voices of the singers" and rated the album 7.5/10. IndiaGlitz gave a review stating "For those of you who expected Mani Sharma to do a balancing act, the audio might let you down a bit. Far from dishing out a veritable mix of genres, the album seems a rehash of yesteryear songs. Bhaskarabhatla's lyrics do not disappoint, while the singers prove a good choice. A must-listen for the mass audience." way2movies.com gave a review stating "Cameraman Ganga Tho Rambabu [CMGR] has a peppy and entertaining numbers that go well with the youth and masses. But Mani Sharma’s tunes aren’t refreshing or innovative as it reminds you of his past works or other popular beats. However, the choice of singers is apt who have breathed life into the otherwise not so refreshing compositions. CMGR album will stay longer with the listeners if the picturisation is impressive. Give a listen!!!" and rated the album on an average 3.125/5. Cinecorn.com gave a review stating "As said at the very beginning we had very high expectations because of the combination and hence the output has been disappointing to put it mildly. Most of the songs seem to be made for onscreen enjoyment rather than for listening pleasure. Still there are bits and interludes in some songs that have an instant likeability which might find favor with the fans."

== Awards ==
2nd South Indian International Movie Awards

- SIIMA Award for Best Female Playback Singer (Telugu) - Geetha Madhuri for "Melikalu"
