= Gabbar Singh (soundtrack) =

Soundtrack album by Devi Sri Prasad
- Released: 15 April 2012
- Recorded: 2011–2012
- Genre: Feature film soundtrack
- Length: 23:08
- Language: Telugu
- Label: Aditya Music
- Producer: Devi Sri Prasad

Devi Sri Prasad chronology
Oosaravelli (2011)	Gabbar Singh (2012)	Julai (2012)

Gabbar Singh is the soundtrack to the film of the same name directed by Harish Shankar and produced by Bandla Ganesh's Parameswara Art Productions starring Pawan Kalyan. The soundtrack to the film featured six songs composed by Devi Sri Prasad with lyrics written by Ramajogayya Sastry, Chandrabose, Sahithi, Bhaskarabhatla and Prasad himself. The soundtrack was released on 15 April 2012 through the Aditya Music label.

== Development ==
The film's soundtrack consisted of six songs curated by Prasad, who previously collaborated with Kalyan on Jalsa (2008) and also collaborating with Shankar for the first time. Popular Telugu actor Kota Srinivasa Rao lent his vocals for a song in the film, as did Kalyan for the song "Pilla". There were rumours that the song called "O Bava" were circulating around the internet but Prasad denied that he had composed such a song for the film and "someone have might have uploaded it 'by mistake' as our song."

== Release ==
On 15 April 2012, Kalyan, Ganesh, Shankar and few others visited Venkateswara Temple in Tirumala, where they released the first song "Dekho Dekho Gabbar Singh" and soon after, they went to Visakhapatnam and visited Simhachalam Temple to release the second song "Akasam Ammayaithe". The remaining songs were released at the film's music launch event which was held at Shilpakala Vedika in Hyderabad on the very same day. Although, Chiranjeevi and Ram Charan were reported to attend the event, only the former appeared as the chief guest. The makers further unveiled a mobile application for fans to stream the event live on their mobile phones.

== Track listing ==
No.	Title	Lyrics	Singer(s)	Length
1.	"Dekho Dekho Gabbar Singh"	Ramajogayya Sastry	Baba Sehgal, Naveen Madhav	4:21
2.	"Akasam Ammayaithe"	Chandrabose	Shankar Mahadevan, Gopika Poornima	4:53
3.	"Mandu Baabulam"	Sahithi	Kota Srinivasa Rao, Chorus	1:35
4.	"Pillaa"	Devi Sri Prasad	Vaddepalli Srinivas, Pawan Kalyan	3:49
5.	"Dil Se"	Bhaskarabhatla Ravi Kumar	Karthik, Swetha Mohan	4:23
6.	"Kevvu Keka"	Sahithi	Mamta Sharma, Murali	4:07
Total length:				23:08

== Reception ==
Karthik Srinivasan of Milliblog commented that the soundtrack for the film is "notches below Thaman's Tamil equivalent (Osthe)". Radhika Rajamani of Rediff.com wrote "Devisprasad's music was in tune with the story". Karthik Pasupulate of IndiaTimes called the music as a "standout" and "enhances the whole experience". Sangeetha Devi Dundoo of The Hindu said that the music adds "zing" to the film, further stating "The 70s hangover is hard to miss in the background score".

== Awards and nominations ==
Ceremony	Category	Nominee	Result
Hyderabad Times Film Awards 2012	Best Music Director	Devi Sri Prasad	Won
TSR – TV9 National Film Awards 2012	Best Playblack Singer – Male	Vaddepalli Srinivas – "Ey Pillaa"	Won
2nd South Indian International Movie Awards	Best Music Director – Telugu	Devi Sri Prasad	Won
2nd South Indian International Movie Awards	Best Male Playback Singer – Telugu	Shankar Mahadevan for "Akasam Ammayaithe"	Nominated
2nd South Indian International Movie Awards	Best Female Playback Singer – Telugu	Mamta Sharma for "Kevvu Keka"	Nominated
60th Filmfare Awards South	Best Music Director	Devi Sri Prasad	Won
60th Filmfare Awards South	Best Lyrics	Sahithi Pawan – "Kevvu Keka"	Nominated
60th Filmfare Awards South	Best Playback Singer (Male)	Vaddepalli Srinivas – "Pillaa"	Won
Mirchi Music Awards South 2012	Best Album of the Year – Jury Choice	Devi Sri Prasad	Won
Mirchi Music Awards South 2012	Best Album of the Year – Listeners Choice	Devi Sri Prasad	Won
Mirchi Music Awards South 2012	Best Song of the Year – Jury Choice	"Akasam Ammayaithe"	Won
Mirchi Music Awards South 2012	Best Song of the Year – Listeners Choice	"Kevvu Keka"	Won
Mirchi Music Awards South 2012	Best Composer of the Year	Devi Sri Prasad	Won
