= Power (2014 Telugu film soundtrack) =

Soundtrack album by S. Thaman
- Released: 1 July 2013
- Recorded: 2012–2013
- Genre: Feature film soundtrack
- Length: 19:44
- Language: Telugu
- Label: Aditya Music
- Producer: S. Thaman

S. Thaman chronology
Yevadu (2013)	Power (2013)	1: Nenokkadine (2013)

Power is the soundtrack to the 2014 Telugu-language action comedy film of the same name directed by K. S. Ravindra and produced by Rockline Venkatesh starring Ravi Teja, Hansika Motwani and Regina Cassandra. The film's musical score is composed by S. Thaman and featured five songs written by Bhaskarabhatla Ravi Kumar, Varikuppala Yadagiri Goud, Sirivennela Seetharama Sastry and Krishna Chaitanya. The soundtrack was released at an event held at Shilpakala Vedika in Hyderabad on 1 July 2013 and distributed by Aditya Music in digital and physical formats.

== Production ==
S. Thaman composed the film's soundtrack and background score in his seventh collaboration with Teja. (Note: Thaman had previously scored Teja's Kick, Anjaneyulu (both 2009), Mirapakay, Veera (both 2011), Nippu (2012) and Balupu (2013).) He started working on the film's music session since November 2013 before he was officially involved as part of the film's technical crew. The music sittings were held in Chennai. The compositions for the film continued for six months and was completed on 20 May 2014. By the end of May 2014, Ravi Teja crooned for the number "Notanki Notanki" whose lyrics were penned by Bhaskarabhatla and was recorded in Chennai. On 25 July 2014, Thaman posted in his Twitter page that prominent music director Chakri performed a song in the film's soundtrack.

== Release ==
On 4 August 2014, a press release stated that the film's soundtrack would be launched on 8 August 2014, by hosting a promotional event at Shilpakala Vedika in Hyderabad. Junglee Music acquired the audio rights of the film. The track list without details of singers, lyricists and duration was released on 6 August 2014, which featured 5 songs which were available later at Raaga.com. The soundtrack disc's back cover was released by Junglee Music on the next day which in addition contained the details of singers and the lyricists.

The cast and crew of the film were present at the audio launch event at Shilpakala Vedika where V. V. Vinayak, Dil Raju and Karnataka MP Muniratna Naidu were invited as the chief guests. V. V. Vinayak presented the audio CD of the film to Muniratna Naidu.

== Reception ==
Reviewing the soundtrack, IndiaGlitz wrote "The album is a package for the fans of Mass Maharaja, who wouldn't demand musical richness when it is their favourite hero who is jiving." Karthik Srinivasan of Milliblog described it as a "typical Thaman masala soundtrack". Jeevi of Idlebrain.com chose "Badmashu Pilla" and "Notanki Notanki" as his picks from the album; he further cited "Champesindee" and "Nuvvu Nenu Janta", which were reminiscent of "Nee Yedalo Naaku Chotu Vaddu" from Awara (2010) and "Saree Ke Fall Sa" from R... Rajkumar (2013).

Sridhar Vivan of Bangalore Mirror felt that "Thaman's music is a tad disappointing with just two numbers scoring well." Suresh Kavirayani of Deccan Chronicle wrote "SS Thaman provided the music and this time he has come up with some mass ones especially the one where Ravi Teja sung is the highlight." A reviewer from Sify wrote "Thaman's tunes sound good to ears."

== Track listing ==
Power (Original Motion Picture Soundtrack) track listing
No.	Title	Lyrics	Artist(s)	Length
1.	"Devudaa Devudaa"	Bhaskarabhatla Ravi Kumar	Adnan Sami	4:03
2.	"Badmashu Pilla"	Varikuppala Yadagiri Goud	Chakri, K. S. Ravindra, Varikuppala Yadagiri Goud	4:29
3.	"Notanki Notanki"	Bhaskarabhatla Ravi Kumar	Ravi Teja, M. M. Manasi	4:10
4.	"Champesindee"	Sirivennela Seetharama Sastry	Karthik	3:35
5.	"Nuvvu Nenu Janta"	Krishna Chaitanya	Sooraj Santhosh, Malavika	3:27
Total length:				19:44
