= Dhruva (soundtrack) =

Dhruva (Original Motion Picture Soundtrack)

Soundtrack album by Hiphop Tamizha
- Released: 9 November 2016
- Recorded: 2016
- Genre: Feature film soundtrack
- Length: 16:49
- Language: Telugu
- Labels: Aditya Music; Sony Music India
- Producer: Hiphop Tamizha

Hiphop Tamizha chronology
Kaththi Sandai (2016)	Dhruva (Original Motion Picture Soundtrack) (2016)	Kavan (2017)

Dhruva (Original Motion Picture Soundtrack) is the soundtrack to the 2016 Telugu-language action film of the same name directed by Surender Reddy. A remake of the Tamil film Thani Oruvan (2015), the film stars Ram Charan, Rakul Preet Singh and Arvind Swamy. The musical score is composed by Hiphop Tamizha in their Telugu debut and features four songs with lyrics written by Chandrabose and Varikuppala Yadagiri. The soundtrack was released under the Aditya Music label on 9 November 2016.

== Development ==
For the film's score and soundtrack, Surender Reddy chose to retain the original composers Hiphop Tamizha. The duo recalled that they did not plan their debut in Telugu industry and mentioned that Reddy liked the original film because of its music, which led them to be retained for this film. Even before they started working on the film, they spent over a week with the director so that they could understand his sensibilities, adding that "In every sense, this was a new film and like the original, it was not an easy arena to enter into".

With this, they composed a new set of tunes with the change in context of the Telugu version. Within their limitations, the duo worked with the lyricists Chandrabose and Varikkuppala Yadagiri to understand the meaning and ensured that the words would be native to the Telugu audience, and also considered numerous aspects like the flavor, linguistics and wide appeal. They further minimized the use of Hindi words to the best of their abilities.

The title song was performed by Bollywood singer Amit Mishra in his Telugu debut. The duo described the title song as a challenging one, and took inspiration from the song "Travelling Soldier" from the Pawan Kalyan-starrer Thammudu (1999). The song "Pareshanura" was a melody number where he experimented with Carnatic music and hip hop. The music composition was completed by October 2016.

== Release ==
Aditya Music acquired the film's audio rights. The film's track list was released with a 10-second song promo on 2 November 2016. Initially, the makers planned for a music launch event at Hyderabad on 9 November 2016, with Pawan Kalyan as the chief guest. However, due to the announcement of the demonetisation, plans for an audio launch was cancelled, and the album was directly released to stores and online on the same date.

The song "Theemai Dhan Vellum" from the original film was reused in Telugu, titled "Manushi Musugulo Mrugam Neney Ra" which was used for promotional purposes. It was released as a bonus track on 7 December 2016 on Sony Music India.

== Reception ==
=== Critics ===
The soundtrack album received positive reviews from critics. Behindwoods rated the album 2.75 out of 5 stating "Dhruva is an impressive album from Hip-Hop Thamizha with enjoyable and experimental compositions". Indiaglitz gave 2.75 out of 5 and stated "An album that doesn't boast of formulaic songs [...] while the party-time song is a rip-off, the title track stands out for its meaningful lyrics and rendition." 123Telugu reviewed "the 'Dhruva' album is more classy, slightly different from the routine, and is an album of situations." Karthik Srinivasan of Milliblog commented "Hip-hop Tamizha's Telugu debut is largely the same of what they are usually known for in Tamil." Karthika Raveendran of Bollywoodlife.com gave 2.5 out of 5 stars and commented "This album will catch everyone's interest as it marks Hip Hop Tamizha's debut in Telugu industry but it won't hold their attention for long."

Sowmya Rajendran of The News Minute wrote "Hiphop Tamizha who composed the soundtrack for the Tamil film has done it for the Telugu one too and the score is just right to complement the taut script." Srividya Palarpathi of The Times of India wrote "While the album has already claimed the attention of the Telugu audiences, the BGM in the film elevates the experience of the film to the next level".

=== Audience ===
The film's audio jukebox crossed one million views in YouTube within a short span of its release.

== Track listing ==
Dhruva (Original Motion Picture Soundtrack) track listing
No.	Title	Lyrics	Singer(s)	Length
1.	"Dhruva Dhruva"	Chandrabose	Amit Mishra	3:27
2.	"Choosa Choosa"	Chandrabose	Padmalatha, Snaggy	3:20
3.	"Pareshanura"	Varikuppala Yadagiri	Padmalatha, Vishnupriya Ravi	3:13
4.	"Neethoney Dance"	Chandrabose	Hiphop Tamizha, Nikhita Gandhi	3:14
Total length:				13:15

Bonus song
No.	Title	Lyrics	Singer(s)	Length
5.	"Manishi Musugulo Mrugam Neney Ra"	Varikuppala Yadagiri	Hiphop Tamizha, Kaushik Krish	3:34
Total length:				16:49

== Accolades ==
Accolades for Dhruva (Original Motion Picture Soundtrack)
Award (Note: Awards are in alphabetical order.)	Date of ceremony (Note: Date is linked to the article about the awards held that year, wherever possible.)	Category	Recipient(s)	Result	Ref.
Filmfare Awards South	17 June 2017	Best Female Playback Singer – Telugu	Padmalatha and Vishnupriya Ravi for "Pareshanura"	Nominated	
IIFA Utsavam	28–29 March 2017	Best Music Director – Telugu	Hiphop Tamizha	Nominated	
South Indian International Movie Awards	30 June–1 July 2017	Best Lyricist – Telugu	Chandrabose for "Choosa Choosa"	Nominated	
South Indian International Movie Awards	30 June–1 July 2017	Best Female Playback Singer – Telugu	Padmalatha for "Choosa Choosa"	Nominated	
