= 1: Nenokkadine (soundtrack album) =

Soundtrack album by Devi Sri Prasad
- Released: 21 December 2013
- Recorded: 2013
- Genre: Feature film soundtrack
- Length: 23:50
- Language: Telugu
- Label: Lahari Music
- Producer: Devi Sri Prasad

Devi Sri Prasad chronology
Bhai (2013)	1: Nenokkadine (2013)	Veeram (2013)

1: Nenokkadine is the soundtrack album to the 2014 film of the same name directed by Sukumar starring Mahesh Babu and Kriti Sanon. The film features five songs composed by Devi Sri Prasad with lyrics written by Chandrabose. The album was released under the Lahari Music label on 21 December 2013 at a launch event held in Shilpakala Vedika, Hyderabad to positive reviews and Prasad received a nomination for SIIMA Award for Best Music Director for his work in the film.

== Development ==
Sukumar's usual composer Devi Sri Prasad was assigned to compose the score and soundtrack for 1: Nenokkadine; it is also Prasad's first collaboration with Babu. While discussing the script with Sukumar, the latter felt that Prasad translated his vision in the background score. The music sittings began in Hyderabad in September 2012, with Prasad describing the album as "radically different" and unique from his previous works. The re-recording of the film's second half was completed within seven days. Prem Rakshith choreographed the song sequences.

== Marketing and release ==
The music rights were acquired by Lahari Music for ₹1 crore (equivalent to ₹1.7 crore or US$200,000 in 2023), a record for a Telugu film. A 25-second teaser of the song "Who Are You?" was released on 17 December. The film's soundtrack was launched at the Shilpakala Vedika in Hyderabad, with the presence of the cast and crew, and watched by 14,500 people on venue. The event was premiered live in 24 theatres across Andhra Pradesh and Telangana, being the first Indian soundtrack release event to be showcased live in theatres. The event was also aired live on NTV and TV9 Telugu which acquired the telecasting rights for ₹2.5 crore (equivalent to ₹4.2 crore or US$500,000 in 2023); the deal was finalized with an agreement that media personnel (television, newspaper and website) should not be present at the venue and those who willing to attend, should buy a fan pass to attend without professional cameras, and photos will be shared after the event ends. The rhyme featured in the film's climax scene was launched by Mahesh's son Gautam Krishna (who also played the protagonist's younger version) through YouTube on 23 January 2014.

== Reception ==
A reviewer from The Times of India complimented its variety in genres, describing it as an "engaging" album. Karthik Srinivasan of Milliblog wrote "Devi Sri Prasad delivers a lively and ear-friendly soundtrack for his first film with Mahesh Babu". Sangeetha Devi Dundoo of The Hindu wrote "As a surprise there's Devi Sri Prasad's background score that's so different from his regular fare. He's been given the chance to push the envelope and boy, he does it so well." A reviewer from Sify wrote: "Music director Devi Sri Prasad excels in providing background score." Sridhar Vivan of Bangalore Mirror called it as one of the highlights. Suresh Kavirayani of Deccan Chronicle criticized the music to be "mediocre".

== Track listing ==
All lyrics are written by Chandrabose.

No.	Title	Artist(s)	Length
1.	"Who Are You?"	Devi Sri Prasad	4:53
2.	"Aww Tuzo Mogh Korta"	Neha Bhasin	4:23
3.	"O Sayonara Sayonara"	Sooraj Santhosh, M. M. Manasi	4:44
4.	"You are My Love" (English lyrics: Devi Sri Prasad)	Piyush Kapoor	4:34
5.	"London Babu"	Priya Hemesh	5:16
Total length:			23:49

== Accolades ==
Ceremony	Category	Nominee	Result	Ref.
62nd Filmfare Awards South	Filmfare Award for Best Female Playback Singer – Telugu	Neha Bhasin (for "Aww Tuzo Mogh Korta")	Nominated	
4th South Indian International Movie Awards	Best Music Director – Telugu	Devi Sri Prasad	Nominated	
4th South Indian International Movie Awards	Best Male Playback Singer – Telugu	Devi Sri Prasad (for "Who R U?")	Nominated	
4th South Indian International Movie Awards	Best Female Playback Singer – Telugu	Neha Bhasin (for "Aww Tuzo Mogh Korta")	Won	
11th CineMAA Awards	Special Music Award	Devi Sri Prasad	Won	
13th Santosham Film Awards	Big FM Music Award	Devi Sri Prasad	Won	
