= Race Gurram (soundtrack) =

Soundtrack album To Race Gurram by S. Thaman
- Released: 16 March 2014
- Recorded: 2014
- Genre: Feature film soundtrack; Electro-pop; Synth-pop; Dub-step; Folk-pop
- Length: 25:02
- Language: Telugu
- Label: Lahari Music
- Producer: S. Thaman

S. Thaman chronology
Vallinam (2014)	Race Gurram (2014)	Damaal Dumeel (2014)

Race Gurram is the feature film soundtrack of the 2014 action comedy film of the same name. Directed by Surender Reddy, the film's music and background score was composed by S. Thaman marking his first collaboration with Allu Arjun and second collaboration with Surender Reddy.

The official soundtrack album consists of 6 songs composed by S. Thaman and Chandrabose, Rehaman, Viswa and Varikuppala Yadagiri Goud penning the lyrics.

Thus it emerged as one of the biggest successful soundtracks of the year.

== Development ==
In August 2013, the songs were praised by Allu Arjun which he termed as "original" in contrary to the criticism that Thaman always copies tunes from his old films. In November 2013, Thaman tweeted that all the songs are composed and that the audio can be launched at any time.

In early 2014, it was revealed that Shruti Haasan crooned for that song.

According to the official track list, there were six songs in which Chandrabose, Rehman, Viswa penned each while Varikuppala Yadagiri, well known for his work in the Telugu films Erra Sainyam, Bachelors and Veera Telangana, made a sort of comeback penning the remaining three songs including the Title track of the film. The film also marked the debut of Siddharth Mahadevan as a playback singer and Malaysian rapper Rabbit Mac in Telugu with the song "Sweety", which is based on Matteo Becucci's "Amandoi".

In an interview to Deccan Chronicle, Dinesh Kanagaratnam spoke about the song "Gala Gala" sung by him which marked his first Telugu song as a singer instead of a rapper. He said "S. Thaman asked me to write the song in Tamil and record the dummy. He also made me sing in a total different vocal tone. A few days later we reproduced the entire vocal in Telugu. It took me three days to record. And the song sounds fantastic. I feel the song is simple and well balanced between western tones and the Indian tone."

== Release ==
In January 2014, Lahari Music purchased the Audio rights for an amount of ₹75 lakh (US$89,000). However, with news of Pawan Kalyan holding a public meeting to announce his political ambitions coming out, the producers decided to postpone the proposed audio launch.

The 30 seconds promos of all the six songs were released on 13 March 2014 by Lahari Music.

The venue was confirmed later which was Park Hyatt hotel at Hyderabad and the Album was reported to be launched at 6:30 PM IST.

== Track listing ==
Race Gurram (Original Motion Picture Soundtrack)
No.	Title	Lyrics	Singer(s)	Length
1.	"Boochade Boochade"	Chandrabose	Shreya Ghoshal, Rahul Nambiar, Naveen Madhav	04:23
2.	"Sweety"	Varikuppala Yadagiri	Siddharth Mahadevan, Rabbit Mac	04:30
3.	"Cinema Choopustha Mama"	Varikuppala Yadagiri	Simha, Divya, Ganga	04:29
4.	"Gala Gala"	Rehaman	Dinesh Kanagaratnam, Megha	04:06
5.	"Down Down"	Viswa	Shruti Haasan, S. Thaman	04:00
6.	"Race Gurram"	Varikuppala Yadagiri	Usha Uthup, M. M. Manasi, M. M. Monisha	03:31
Total length:				25:02

Reception

Karthik of Milliblog wrote, "The race horse is worth the bet!"
