= SIIMA Award for Best Female Playback Singer – Telugu =

- Awarded for: Best Female Playback Singer of a song in Telugu cinema
- Country: India
- Presented by: Vibri Media Group
- First award: 21 June 2012 (for films released in 2011)
- Most recent winner: Sameera Bharadwaj, Court: State vs a Nobody (2025)

Highlights
- Most wins: Geetha Madhuri and Madhu Priya (2)
- Most nominations: Shreya Ghoshal (11)

SIIMA Award for Best Female Playback Singer – Telugu is presented by Vibri media group as part of its annual South Indian International Movie Awards, for the best singing by a female playback singer/vocalist of a Telugu-language song. The award was first given in 2012 for songs and films released in 2011.

== Superlatives ==
Categories	Recipient	Record
Most wins	Geetha Madhuri	2
Most wins	Madhu Priya	2
Most nominations	Shreya Ghoshal	11
Most consecutive nominations	Shreya Ghoshal	6 (2011–2015)
Oldest winner	K. S. Chithra	Age 49 (3rd SIIMA)
Youngest winner	Madhu Priya	Age 21 (7th SIIMA)
Oldest nominee	K. S. Chithra	Age 60 (11th SIIMA)
Youngest nominee	Prakruthi Reddy	Age 13 (11th SIIMA)

== Winners ==
Year	Singer	Song	Film	Ref
2011	Shreya Ghoshal	"Chali Chaliga"	Mr. Perfect	
2012	Geetha Madhuri	"Melikalu"	Cameraman Gangatho Rambabu	
2013	K. S. Chithra	"Seethamma Vakitlo"	Seethamma Vakitlo Sirimalle Chettu	
2014	Neha Bhasin	"Aww Thujo Mogh Korta"	1: Nenokkadine	
2015	Satya Yamini	"Mamathala Thalli"	Baahubali: The Beginning	
2016	Ramya Behara	"Rang De"	A Aa	
2017	Madhu Priya	"Vachinde"	Fidaa	
2018	M. M. Manasi	"Rangamma Mangamma"	Rangasthalam	
2019	Chinmayi Sripada	"Priyathama Priyathama"	Majili	
2020	Madhu Priya	"He's So Cute"	Sarileru Neekevvaru	
2021	Geetha Madhuri	"Jai Balayya"	Akhanda	
2022	Mangli	"Jinthaak"	Dhamaka	
2023	Shakthisree Gopalan	"Ammaadi"	Hi Nanna	
2024	Shilpa Rao	"Chuttamalle"	Devara: Part 1	
2025	Sameera Bharadwaj	"Premalo"	Court: State vs a Nobody	

== Nominations ==
- 2011: Shreya Ghoshal – "Chali Chaliga" from Mr. Perfect
  - Sunidhi Chauhan – "Nath Nath" from Badrinath
  - Swathi Reddy – "A Square B Square" from 100% Love
  - Nithya Menen – "Ammammo Ammo" from Ala Modalaindi
  - Malavika – "Amma Avanee" from Rajanna
- 2012: Geetha Madhuri – "Melikalu" from Cameraman Gangatho Rambabu
  - Shreya Ghoshal – "Sai Andri Nanu Sai Antira" from Krishnam Vande Jagadgurum
  - Mamta Sharma – "Kevvu Keka" from Gabbar Singh
  - Malathy Lakshman – "Orinayano" from Rebel
  - Suchitra – "Sir Osthara" from Businessman
- 2013: K. S. Chithra – "Seethamma Vakitlo" from Seethamma Vakitlo Sirimalle Chettu
  - Shreya Ghoshal – "Hey Naayak" from Naayak
  - Suchitra – "Diamond Girl" from Baadshah
  - Geetha Madhuri– "Top Lesi Poddi" from Iddarammayilatho
- 2014: Neha Bhasin – "Aww Thujo Mogh Korta" from 1: Nenokkadine
  - Shreya Ghoshal – "Chinni Chinni Aasalu" from Manam
  - Shreya Ghoshal – "Nee Jathaga Nenundali" from Yevadu
  - K. S. Chithra– "Gopikamma" from Mukunda
  - Chinmayi Sripada – "Vaddantune" from Run Raja Run
- 2015: Satya Yamini – "Mamathala Thalli" from Baahubali: The Beginning
  - Shreya Ghoshal – "Nijamenani Nammani" from Kanche
  - Chinmayi Sripada – "Vennellona Mounam" from Surya vs Surya
  - Priya Himesh – "Gathama Gathama" from Malli Malli Idi Rani Roju
  - Ramya Behara – "Dhivara" from Baahubali: The Beginning
- 2016: Ramya Behara – "Rang De" from A Aa
  - Geetha Madhuri – "Pakka Local" from Janatha Garage
  - Padmalatha – "Chusa Chusa" from Dhruva
  - Sameera Bharadwaj – "Telusa Telusa" from Sarrainodu
  - Uma Neha – "Tikku Tikkantu" from Babu Bangaram
- 2017: Madhu Priya – "Vachinde" from Fidaa
  - Geetha Madhuri, M. M. Manasi – "Mahanubhavudu" from Mahanubhavudu
  - Neha Bhasin – "Swing Zara" from Jai Lava Kusa
  - Sony Komanduri – "Hamsa Naava" from Baahubali 2: The Conclusion
  - Uma Neha – "Paisa Vasool" from Paisa Vasool
- 2018: M. M. Manasi – "Rangamma Mangamma" from Rangasthalam
  - Chinmayi – "Yenti Yenti" from Geetha Govindam
  - Shreya Ghoshal – "Allasani Vari" from Tholi Prema
  - Shreya Gopuraju – "Tik Tik Tik" from Savyasachi
  - Sunitha Upadrashta – "Chivaraku Migiledi" from Mahanati
- 2019: Chinmayi Sripada – "Priyathama Priyathama" from Majili
  - Mangli – "Bullet Song" from George Reddy
  - Shreya Ghoshal & Sunidhi Chauhan – "Sye Raa Title Song" from Sye Raa Narasimha Reddy
  - Mohana Bhogaraju, Hari Teja & Satya Yamini – "Oo Bava" from Prati Roju Pandage
  - Yamini Ghantasala – "Gira Gira" from Dear Comrade
- 2020: Madhu Priya – "He's So Cute" from Sarileru Neekevvaru
  - Chinmayi Sripada – "Oohale" from Jaanu
  - Spoorthi Yadagiri – "Undipova" from Savaari
  - Shreya Ghoshal – "Vastunna Vachestunna" from V
  - Ramya Behara – "Ekaantham" from Colour Photo
- 2021: Geetha Madhuri – "Jai Balayya" from Akhanda
  - Mangli – "Saranga Dariya" from Love Story
  - Mounika Yadav – "Saami Saami" from Pushpa: The Rise
  - Indravathi Chauhan – "Oo Antava Oo Oo Antava" from Pushpa: The Rise
  - Shreya Ghoshal – "Jala Jala Jalapaatham Nuvvu" from Uppena
- 2022: Mangli – "Jinthaak" from Dhamaka
  - Divya Malika – "Kolu Kolu" from Virata Parvam
  - Jonita Gandhi – "Ma Ma Mahesha" from Sarkaru Vaari Paata
  - K. S. Chithra – "Antha Ishtam" from Bheemla Nayak
  - Prakruthi Reddy – "Komma Uyyala" from RRR
- 2023: Shakthisree Gopalan – "Ammaadi" from Hi Nanna
  - Dhee – "Chamkeela Angeelesi" from Dasara
  - Harika Narayan – "Ravanasura Anthem" from Ravanasura
  - Sahithi Chaganti, Satya Yamini – "Maa Bava Manobhavalu" from Veera Simha Reddy
  - Shweta Mohan – "Mastaaru Mastaaru" from Sir
- 2024: Shilpa Rao – "Chuttamalle" from Devara: Part 1
  - Ramya Behara – "Hey Rangule" from Amaran
  - Sahithi Chaganti – "Kurchi Madathapetti" from Guntur Kaaram
  - Shreya Ghoshal – "Sooseki" from Pushpa 2: The Rule
  - Shweta Mohan – "Srimathi Garu" from Lucky Baskhar
- 2025: Sameera Bharadwaj – "Premalo" from Court: State vs a Nobody
  - Chinmayi Sripada – "Em Jaruguthondhi" from The Girlfriend
  - K. S. Chithra – "Parichayamila" from 8 Vasantalu
  - Madhu Priya – "Godari Gattu" from Sankranthiki Vasthunam
  - Shreya Ghoshal – "Hilesso Hilessa" from Thandel
  - Sruthi Ranjani – "Suvvi Suvvi" from They Call Him OG

== See also ==
- SIIMA Award for Best Male Playback Singer – Telugu
