= Akhanda (soundtrack) =

Soundtrack album by Thaman S
- Released: 9 December 2021
- Recorded: 2020–2021
- Genre: Feature film soundtrack
- Length: 17:06
- Language: Telugu
- Label: Lahari Music
- Producer: Thaman S

Thaman S chronology
Enemy (2021)	Akhanda (2021)	Super Machi (2022)

Singles from Akhanda
- 1. "Adigaa Adigaa" Released: 18 September 2021; 2. "Akhanda Title Song" Released: 8 November 2021; 3. "Jai Balayya" Released: 27 November 2021

Akhanda is the soundtrack to the 2021 film of the same name directed by Boyapati Srinu starring Nandamuri Balakrishna and Pragya Jaiswal. The soundtrack to the film features four songs composed by S. Thaman and written by Anantha Sriram and Kalyan Chakkravarthy. It was released by Lahari Music on 9 December 2021.

== Background ==
Akhanda is Thaman's second collaboration with Srinu after Sarrainodu (2016) and second with Balakrishna after Dictator. Thaman and Srinu extensively researched on the music of Akhanda to understand the nuances of Aghori saints and maintained its authenticity through the instrumentation and lyrics. He used Aghora chants and mantras throughout the film score. He employed a choral ensemble of around 120 singers performing in the background. According to Thaman, the music needed to match the film's tempo, as the film has heavy fight sequences and dialogues. Thaman had initially composed five songs for the film, but one of the tracks had to be removed after watching the final edit, as it interrupted the flow of the narrative. The re-recording of the film happened during September 2021, where Thaman updated the initial compositions for the film score, utilizing the film's delay. Thaman called his work for the film as his best to date.

== Release ==
The first single from the album, "Adigaa Adigaa" performed by S. P. Charan and M. L. Shruthi was released on 18 September 2021. The second song—the film's title track—performed by Shankar Mahadevan, and his sons Siddharth and Shivam, released on 8 November. The third song "Jai Balayya" was released at the film's pre-release event in Hyderabad on 27 November.

== Track listing ==
No.	Title	Lyrics	Singer(s)	Length
1.	"Adigaa Adigaa"	Kalyan Chakravarthy	S. P. Charan, ML Shruti	4:42
2.	"Akhanda Title Song"	Ananta Sriram	Shankar Mahadevan, Siddharth Mahadevan, Shivam Mahadevan	4:44
3.	"Jai Balayya"	Ananta Sriram	Geetha Madhuri, Sahithi Chaganti, Satya Yamini, Aditi Bhavaraju	4:24
4.	"Amma Song"	Kalyan Chakravarthy	Mohana Bhogaraju	3:16
Total length:				17:06

== Reception ==
Sangeetha Devi Dundoo of The Hindu described the score as "rousing". Mukesh Manjunath of Film Companion said "the music becomes the green chilli that some people eat along with food that's already spicy." In contrast, Manoj Kumar R. of The Indian Express found Thaman's score as "inccessant" and outdid the "screams and whistles in a packed movie theatre". He was also critical of allegedly taking the opening theme of the song "Chandralekha" from Thiruda Thiruda (1993) for the introduction of the villain.

One of the theatres from Cinemark Theatres chain reduced the volume of the speakers while playing the film, as the executives felt that the score being "too loud" and would damage the speakers.

== Accolades ==
Award (Note: Awards, festivals and organizations are in alphabetical order.)	Date of ceremony (Note: Date is linked to the article about the awards held that year, wherever possible.)	Category	Recipient(s)	Result	Ref.
South Indian International Movie Awards	10–11 September 2022	Best Music Director – Telugu	Thaman S	Nominated	
South Indian International Movie Awards	10–11 September 2022	Best Lyricist – Telugu	Kalyan Chakravarthy – ("Amma Song")	Nominated	
South Indian International Movie Awards	10–11 September 2022	Best Female Playback Singer – Telugu	Geetha Madhuri – ("Jai Balayya")	Won	
