= Yevadu (soundtrack) =

Yevadu (Original Motion Picture Soundtrack)

Soundtrack album by Devi Sri Prasad
- Released: 30 June 2013
- Recorded: 2013
- Genre: Feature film soundtrack
- Length: 26:04
- Language: Telugu
- Label: Aditya Music
- Producer: Devi Sri Prasad

Devi Sri Prasad chronology
Veeram (2013)	Yevadu (Original Motion Picture Soundtrack) (2013)	Bramman (2014)

Yevadu (Original Motion Picture Soundtrack) is the soundtrack album to the 2014 film of the same name directed by Vamshi Paidipally and produced by Dil Raju under Sri Venkateswara Creations, starring Allu Arjun, Ram Charan, Shruti Haasan, Amy Jackson and Kajal Aggarwal. The soundtrack featured six songs composed by Devi Sri Prasad, with lyrics written by Krishna Chaitanya, Sirivennela Seetharama Sastry, Ramajogayya Sastry, Chandrabose and Sri Mani. The album was released on 30 June 2013 under the Aditya Music label.

== Development ==
In early November 2011, Devi Sri Prasad was confirmed as the film's music director in his maiden collaboration with both Paidipally and Charan. The music sittings for the film began in Goa. An item number was composed during May 2012, with praise from Charan for his work. In September, the title of that song was revealed to be "Ayyo Papam" and was shot at Ramoji Film City in Hyderabad. By early October, Prasad had completed recording four songs. In February 2013, it was further reported that the song "Bolo Bolo Rani" from Chiranjeevi's Rowdy Alludu (1991) would be remixed for the film, but both Prasad and Charan rebuffed those claims.

== Release ==
The release of the soundtrack was postponed multiple times, due to the delay in the film's shooting schedules. It was first planned to be released on the second week of May 2013, and later to an undisclosed date in June. Later, the film's music launch was scheduled to be held on 29 June 2013 at Shilpakala Vedika in Hyderabad, which was again postponed a day later, due to security reasons. The film's track list was released on 28 June, two days before the film's music launch. The cast and crew of the film attended the event with Chiranjeevi as the chief guist. Aditya Music acquired the audio rights.

The promos for the songs "Nee Jathaga Nenundali", "Oye Oye", "Pimple Dimple", "Freedom" and "Cheliya Cheliya" were released before the film's release, on 10, 25, 31 October, 31 December 2013 and 7 January 2014, respectively. While the promo of the song "Ayyo Paapam" was unveiled on 13 March 2014, two months after the film.

== Reception ==
The audio received positive reviews. The Times of India gave a review stating "Devi Sri Prasad has come up with an album that is high on the beat and low on melody but plays to the galleries unabashedly, blending multiple genres. Though there isn't one stand-out song, the album has an overriding happy vibe about it. It isn't a record that you will cherish for long, but might just swing along while it lasts" and rated the album 3/5. A reviewer from Oneindia Entertainment gave a review stating "Devi Sri Prasad has composed some of the youthful and fresh tunes for the soundtracks. Having meaningful lyrics, some of the songs are very melodious and trendy. Devi Sri Prasad has used Western instruments as well as rustic beats for them. A couple of songs offer a chance to Ram Charan Teja to show his dancing skills. Like his previous music albums, the composer has played it safe and all his songs are decent and appealing."

Karthik Srinivasan of Milliblog wrote "There are two types of Devi Sri Prasad soundtracks – one where his recycling is utterly boring, and the other where his recycling somehow works against all ennui. Yevadu's soundtrack belongs to the latter category." Y. Sunita Chowdary of The Hindu praised Prasad's music as one of the assets. In contrast, Sify wrote, "Except `Nee Jathaga`, Devi Sri Prasad`s music is regular stuff."

== Legacy ==
The song "Nee Jathaga Nenundali" inspired the 2014 romantic film of the same name, which is a remake of Aashiqui 2.

== Track listing ==
Yevadu (Original Motion Picture Soundtrack) track listing
No.	Title	Lyrics	Singer(s)	Length
1.	"Freedom"	Krishna Chaitanya	Suchith Suresan	4:13
2.	"Nee Jathaga"	Sirivennela Seetharama Sastry	Karthik, Shreya Ghoshal	4:36
3.	"Ayyo Papam"	Ramajogayya Sastry	Ranjith, Mamta Sharma	4:43
4.	"Cheliya Cheliya"	Chandrabose	KK	4:50
5.	"Oye Oye"	Sri Mani	David Simon, Andrea	3:31
6.	"Pimple Dimple"	Ramajogayya Sastry	Sagar, Ranina Reddy	4:11
Total length:				26:04

== Accolades ==
Accolades for Yevadu (Original Motion Picture Soundtrack)
Ceremony	Category	Nominee	Result	Ref.
62nd Filmfare Awards South	Best Music Director – Telugu	Devi Sri Prasad	Nominated	
4th South Indian International Movie Awards	Best Female Playback Singer – Telugu	Shreya Ghoshal (for "Nee Jathaga")	Nominated	
11th CineMAA Awards	Special Music Award	Devi Sri Prasad	Won	
13th Santosham Film Awards	Big FM Music Award	Devi Sri Prasad	Won	
