= 100% Love (soundtrack) =

Soundtrack album by Devi Sri Prasad
- Released: 2 April 2011
- Recorded: 2011
- Genre: Feature film soundtrack
- Length: 36:24
- Language: Telugu
- Label: Aditya Music
- Producer: Devi Sri Prasad

Devi Sri Prasad chronology
| Mr. Perfect (2011) | 100% Love (2011) | Ready (2011) |
External audio
- Official Audio Jukebox on YouTube

100% Love is the film soundtrack of the 2011 romance film of the same name directed by Sukumar which starred Naga Chaitanya and Tamannaah. The music and background score was composed by Sukumar's regular associate Devi Sri Prasad. The album consisted on 8 songs which included 2 bit songs in the first release and 2 another bit songs in the next release. Chandrabose, Ramajogayya Sastry and Sri Mani penned the Lyrics. The album was released on 2 April 2011 at Rock Gardens in Hyderabad on Aditya Music label. Upon release, 100% Love received positive response from critics.

== Track listing ==
| No. | Title | Lyrics | Singer(s) | Length |
|---|---|---|---|---|
| 1. | "Infatuation" | Chandrabose | Adnan Sami | 5:10 |
| 2. | "Thiru Thiru Gananadha" | Ramajogayya Sastry | Harini | 3:28 |
| 3. | "Aho Balu" | Sri Mani | Ranjith, Sri Charan | 5:09 |
| 4. | "'A Square B Square" (Male Version) | Sri Mani | Devi Sri Prasad | 2:05 |
| 5. | "Dhooram Dhooram" | Chandrabose | Tippu | 4:49 |
| 6. | "A Square B Square" (Female Version) | Sri Mani | Swati Reddy | 1:51 |
| 7. | "That is Mahalakshmi" | Sri Mani | Richard, Chorus | 3:23 |
| 8. | "Diyalo Diyala" | Chandrabose | Priya Himesh, Khushi Murali | 6:31 |
| Total length: | | | | 36:24 |

== Reception ==
The album received positive response from the critics.

123Telugu gave a review stating "On the whole 100% Love has got a very appealing mix of numbers even though it doesn't have a proper love song. The first three songs, along with Swathi's number definitely deserve mention. While the newness is quite appreciable, it seems the album will take some time to sink in, having only college going students as its main target." IndiaGlitz gave a review stating "Devi Sri Prasad is known for giving fantastic rock songs. This time, he scored good marks not only in giving rock music but also melodious tunes to some of the songs and the album has every chance of becoming a good hit and the film would become a musical hit because of the songs. Chandrabose, Ramajogayya Sastry and Sri Mani gave excellent lyrics to all the songs and each song had very good rhythm and melody stuffed in them. Naga Chaitanya whose last film Ye Maaya Chesave was a hit and the audio album proves that he would bag another musical hit to Chaitu’s credit" and termed the Album contained "Cent per cent lovable tunes from Devi". A review published byWay2movies.com said "Well, Devi Sri Prasad has yet again proved with 100% Love that he always gives his 100% best to director Sukumar. 100% Love is pretty awesome album targeted on youth especially, the college going students. Go for it." Milliblog called the Album "A thoroughly engaging soundtrack from DSP". Raagalahari.com gave a review stating "This album tells that Devisri is remarkably creative, funny and very much in love with music. The duo, Sukumar-Devisri certainly knows the pulse of the urban youth and this album is yet another great attempt to grab the attention of the target audience. This ‘100% Love’ is 100% for the youth."

== Awards and nominations ==
| Ceremony | Cateogory | Nominee | Result |
|---|---|---|---|
| 1st South Indian International Movie Awards | Best Music Director (Telugu) | Devi Sri Prasad | Nominated |
| 1st South Indian International Movie Awards | Best Female Playback Singer (Telugu) | Swathi Reddy for "A Square B Square" | Nominated |
| 1st South Indian International Movie Awards | Best Lyricist (Telugu) | Chandrabose for "Infatuation" | Nominated |
| 1st South Indian International Movie Awards | Best Male Playback Singer (Telugu) | Adnan Samifor "Infatuation" | Nominated |
| 59th Filmfare Awards South | Best Music Director – Telugu | Devi Sri Prasad | Nominated |
| 59th Filmfare Awards South | Best Female Playback Singer – Telugu | Swathi Reddy for "A Square B Square" | Nominated |
