= Navvuthu Bathakalira =

2001 film by Kodi Ramakrishna

- Poster
- Directed by: Kodi Ramakrishna
- Written by: Kodi Ramakrishna
- Based on: Eazhaiyin Sirippil (Tamil)
- Produced by: Srinivasa Reddy
- Starring: J. D. Chakravarthy; Malavika; Sangeetha
- Cinematography: Kodi Laxman
- Music by: Devi Sri Prasad
- Distributed by: Sapthagiri Chithralaya
- Release date: 3 February 2001
- Country: India
- Language: Telugu

Navvuthu Bathakalira (transl. Live cheerfully) is a 2001 Indian Telugu-language drama film, starring J. D. Chakravarthy and Malavika. It is a remake of Tamil film Eazhaiyin Sirippil.

== Cast ==
- J. D. Chakravarthy as Ganesh
- Malavika as Dr Sandhya
- Sangeetha as Jayamma
- Uma as Sarala
- Asha Saini
- Giri Babu
- Mallikarjuna Rao
- Sudhakar
- Babu Mohan
- Achyuth as doctor
- Chinna
- Rajitha
- Y. Vijaya
- Kaka Radhakrishnan as Bus owner

== Production ==
The song "Konaseema Kurradaniro" was shot at Nanakgram Guda Studios.

== Soundtrack ==
Navvuthu Bathakalira

Soundtrack album by Devi Sri Prasad
- Released: 2001
- Recorded: 2001
- Genre: Soundtrack
- Length: 24:35
- Label: Aditya Music
- Producer: Devi Sri Prasad

Devi Sri Prasad chronology
Devi (1999)	Navvuthu Bathakalira (2001)	Anandam (2001)

The music was composed by Devi Sri Prasad and released by Aditya Music. All songs were written by Sirivennela Seetharama Sastry.

Track-List
No.	Title	Singer(s)	Length
1.	"Norara Navveddam"	S. P. Balasubrahmanyam	5:19
2.	"Konaseema Kurradanirro"	K. S. Chithra, S. P. Balasubrahmanyam	4:42
3.	"Dhirana Thmo Thakita"	S. P. Balasubrahmanyam, Sumangali	4:24
4.	"Ayyappa Sharanamayya"	S. P. Balasubrahmanyam	5:05
5.	"Din Din Thara"	Murali, Devi Sri Prasad	5:05
Total length:			24:35

== Reception ==
Full Hyderabad wrote "Kodi Ramakrishna ties himself in knots at every turn and to untie himself he introduces more and more characters to such an extent that we keep wondering all through if any more characters will come on the scene and surprise. The surprise element is not restricted to the number of characters alone - you also are wondering (figuratively speaking) who Chakravarti would marry, with four heroines on the scene. Ultimately, however, the veteran surprises you with a twist that even the stupidest of directors would not have conceived of". Andhra Today wrote "The story is too simplistic and appears to be a wrong choice by the director. Generally most love stories are ridden with hurdles and this movie runs on too smooth a course with nothing to contend for. Ganesh's sacrifice too is typical text-book style bereft of any novelty. Sudhaka and Babu Mohan's comedy track also falls short of the entertainment it is meant to provide. In addition, the double meaning dialogue make it quite undesirable. Character portrayalwise too none in the star cast have been afforded much opportunity. Deepthi excels in her dance as the woman in love with Ganesh. Music score by Devi Prasad is excellent. Songs seem to be the movie's redeeming factor". Telugu Cinema wrote "If you think Kodi Ramkrishna who claims himself as Steven Spielberg of Andhra, makes good and matured films think twice. Or go and see Navvuthu batakalira, you will know what I am saying. For viewers it's nothing but sheer torture. With stupid screenplay and mediocre story, the film has nothing to offer".
