= Varikuppala Yadagiri =

- Occupations: Playback singer; Lyricist; Music director
- Years active: 1998–present

Varikuppala Yadagiri is an Indian playback singer, music director and lyricist in the Telugu film industry. He is known for his work as a lyricist and singer in Sampangi (2001), Race Gurram (2014), Power (2014) and Current Theega. He also composed and sang "Okkadochadu" for the Janasena Party.

He frequently collaborated with Sana Yadi Reddy for several films.

== Early life and career ==
Varikuppala Yadagiri comes from humble beginnings: he worked as a cattle rancher in Satapur, Nizamabad. His family got bankrupt twice and he frequented the local Ram temple to sing bhajans. He even dropped out of school before rejoining per his mother's request.

When he chanced upon the shooting of Lady Boss (1995), the film crew told him to meet a doctor named Rajamouli, who makes private albums, since the director of the film did not show up. Yadagiri disliked working with Rajamouli and left midway, which caused Rajamouli to sue Yadgiri. As a result, Yadagiri came to Hyderabad and sang for school and college programs and participated at competitions at Sri Thyagaraya Gana Sabha and Ravindra Bharathi. Upon frequenting an ad about a film with new lyricists directed by Sana Yadireddy (which would become Prema Pallaki), he visited the address and was called to the office the next day to work on the film after they heard his singing.

== Filmography ==
- Note: the number of songs he worked on is listed in parentheticals.

=== As playback singer and lyricist ===
1. Bachelors (2 songs as singer, 3 songs as lyricist)
2. Sampangi (3 songs as singer, 6 songs as lyricist)
3. Ishtam (1 song as singer, 1 song as lyricist)
4. Rave Naa Cheliya (1 song as singer, 4 songs as lyricist)
5. Mandaram (2 songs as singer, 7 songs as lyricist)
6. Abhimani (2 songs as singer, 7 songs as lyricist)
7. Bhageerathudu (2 songs as singer, 7 songs as lyricist)
8. Oka Ammayi Oka Abbayi (5 songs as singer, 5 songs as lyricist)
9. Power (1 song as singer, 1 song as lyricist)
10. Ayomayam Apartment (4 songs as singer, 4 songs as lyricist)
11. Husharu (1 song as singer, 1 song as lyricist)

=== Lyricist ===
1. Prema Pallaki (2)
2. Thotti Gang (1)
3. Premalo Pavani Kalyan (3)
4. Kuchi Kuchi Koonamma (2)
5. Charminar (2)
6. Goa (2)
7. Evadi Gola Vaadidhi (1)
8. Aadi Lakshmi (1)
9. Gnapakam (7)
10. Pellaindhi Kani (1)
11. Student (2)
12. Sawaal (1)
13. Manjeera (1)
14. Race Gurram (3)
15. Dongaata(2)
16. Jadoogadu (3)
17. Kick 2 (2)
18. Varam (4)
19. Kothakatha (5)
20. Current Theega (2)
21. Where Is Vidya Balan (1)
22. Dictator (1)
23. Shourya (2)
24. Dhruva (1)
25. Katamarayudu (1)
26. Inttelligent (1)
27. Marshal (8)
28. Nanna Nenu Naa Boyfriends (1)
29. Arjun Suravaram (4)
30. Krishnashtami (1)
31. 2 Friends (2)
32. Pidugu (2)
33. Yuva Hrudayalu (4)
34. Tagite Tandana (2)
35. Chuttalabbai (1)
36. Sher (1)
37. Kaliyuga (4)
38. "Andarini Challaga Chudu" (Devotional)
39. "Memu Saitham" (Lakshmi Reality Show)

=== Singer ===
1. Repallelo Radha (1)
2. June July (1) (unreleased film)
3. Vignesh (1)
4. Brokerc (1)
5. Supplementary (3)

=== Music Director ===
1. Abhimaani (2005)
2. Kotha Katha (2005)
3. Bhageerathudu (2010)
4. Oka Ammai Oka Abbai (2010)
5. Husharu (2018)
6. Marshal (2019)
7. He Prabhu Dekha De (Odiya)
8. Ayomayam Apartments (2018)
9. Nuvantey Nenani (2021)

Non-movie songs

- "Okkadochadu" (Janasena Party Song)
- "Rachakoda Police"
- "Nenusaitam" (Telangana Police Song)
- "Balapur Ganesh Laddu Song" 2019
- "Jana Gana Manamulalo" (Telangana Police Song)
