= Sarrainodu (soundtrack) =

Soundtrack album by S. Thaman
- Released: 1 April 2016
- Recorded: 2015–2016
- Genre: Feature film soundtrack
- Length: 27:35
- Label: Lahari Music; T-Series
- Producer: S. Thaman

S. Thaman chronology
Zoom (2016)	Sarrainodu (2016)	Dhilluku Dhuddu (2016)

Sarrainodu is the soundtrack to the 2016 film of the same name directed by Boyapati Srinu, starring Allu Arjun, Aadhi Pinisetty, Rakul Preet Singh, Catherine Tresa and Srikanth. The film's soundtrack featured six songs with lyrics written by Sri Mani, Ramajogayya Sastry, Anantha Sriram, Krishna Chaitanya and Bunny Suresh. The soundtrack was released directly through digital and physical formats on 1 April 2016 under Lahari Music and was positively received by critics.

== Development ==
Sarrainodu is Thaman's maiden collaboration with Srinu and his second with Arjun after Race Gurram (2014). In February 2016, it was reported that Arjun would make his debut as a playback singer by performing an EDM number, as a result of Thaman's approach to make the lead actors perform one song under his composition. The particular song was intended to be recorded since the film's launch and was eventually happy with the output. However, Arjun insisted another singer to perform the track. In March, the song "Athiloka Sundari" was recorded with Vishal Dadlani performing it, in his first Telugu song as a singer. Thaman sent few songs of Dadlani to Arjun whom liked it, and later roped him for the song which was tuned at the YRF Studios in Mumbai. The vocals were recorded within 30 minutes. Nakash Aziz, Shreya Ghoshal, Jubin Nautiyal, Brijesh Shandilya and Hard Kaur also performed few of the tracks in the album.

== Release ==
The soundtrack rights were purchased by Lahari Music for an undisclosed price. Initially it was speculated that the film's audio launch is set to be held on the occasion of Valentine's Day (14 February 2016), but the event was eventually postponed to 20 March 2016 and further delayed as the audio launch of Sardar Gabbar Singh took place on the same day. Later, the production team rescinded the plans for an audio launch and it was also announced that the album would be directly released on 1 April 2016.

== Reception ==
The album received positive reviews from critics. 123Telugu summarised: "Thaman sticks to the formula and gives what is the need of the hour, some foot tapping hit numbers". Behindwoods rated the album 2.75 out of 5 and called it as a "fun filled album" being "quite stylish and impressively presented". The Times of India rated the album 3.5 out of 5, stating that "The album is peppered with hits and is sure to do well". Indiaglitz rated the album 3.25 out of 5, describing it as an "interesting" album with the vocals being better than the lyrics. Karthik Srinivasan of Milliblog described it as a "rollicking fun album". Critic based at The Hans India described it as "refreshing and peppy".

In a negative review, H. Shivkumar of Bollywood Life described it as an "average album" criticizing the lack of variety, where "each song is good to be listened to separately, it is the final product that is a letdown".

It topped the charts at Apple Music and other radio stations during release. An event was held on 10 April 2016 at RK Beach in Vishakapatnam, to celebrate the success of the film's music, with Chiranjeevi attending the event as chief guest.

== Track listing ==
No.	Title	Lyrics	Artist(s)	Length
1.	"Athiloka Sundari"	Ramajogayya Sastry, Bunny Suresh	Vishal Dadlani, Karthik	4:15
2.	"You Are My MLA"	Ananth Sriram	Dhanunjay	4:34
3.	"Private Party"	Krishna Chaitanya	M. M. Manasi, MC Vickey	4:23
4.	"Blockbuster"	Ramajogayya Sastry	Shreya Ghoshal, Nakash Aziz, Simha, Sri Krishna, Deepu	5:05
5.	"Telusaa Telusaa"	Sri Mani	Jubin Nautiyal, Sameera Bharadwaj	4:25
6.	"Sarrainodu"	Ramajogayya Sastry	Hard Kaur, Sonu Kakkar, Brijesh Shandilya, Geetha Madhuri	4:55
Total length:				27:35

== Other versions ==
The song "Blockbuster" was later reused as "Vera Level" in Ayogya (2019).
