= Sankranthiki Vasthunam (soundtrack) =

2025 soundtrack album by Bheems Ceciroleo

Soundtrack album by Bheems Ceciroleo
- Released: 14 January 2025
- Recorded: 2024
- Genre: Feature film soundtrack
- Length: 18:04
- Language: Telugu
- Label: T-Series
- Producer: Bheems Ceciroleo

Bheems Ceciroleo chronology
Devaki Nandana Vasudeva (2024)	Sankranthiki Vasthunam (2025)	Mad Square (2025)
External audio
- Audio Jukebox on YouTube

Singles from Sankranthiki Vasthunam
- 1. "Godari Gattu" Released: 3 December 2024; 2. "Meenu" Released: 19 December 2024; 3. "Blockbuster Pongal" Released: 30 December 2024

Sankranthiki Vasthunam is the soundtrack album composed by Bheems Ceciroleo for the 2025 Indian Telugu-language film of the same name. The album consists of six songs with Bhaskarabhatla, Anantha Sriram, Ramajogayya Sastry and Raghuram penning the lyrics. The soundtrack album was released through T-Series on 14 January 2025, on the film's release day.

== Background and development ==
Bheems Ceciroleo was supposed to work in director Anil Ravipudi's debut film Pataas (2015), but was replaced with Sai Karthik for unknown reasons. Thus, this is Bheems's maiden collaboration with Anil Ravipudi and actor Venkatesh. In November 2024, it was announced that the film's audio rights were acquired by T-Series.

The first track "Godari Gattu" marked the comeback of singer Ramana Gogula, who had previously worked with Venkatesh eighteen years ago in Lakshmi (2006). The song "Meenu" was shot at Dehradun featuring Venkatesh and Meenakshi Chaudhary. Anil Ravipudi wanted Venkatesh to sing a song in the film, which was later released as "Blockbuster Pongal". This is latter's second song as a singer, after "Jingidi" from Guru (2017). "Blockbuster Pongal" was shot at Ramanaidu Studios in Hyderabad in late-December 2024.

== Release ==
The first single titled "Godari Gattu" was released on 3 December 2024. The second single titled "Meenu" was released on 19 December 2024. The third single titled "Blockbuster Pongal" was released on 30 December 2024. The soundtrack album was released on 14 January 2025 after the film's release.

== Track listing ==
Track listing
No.	Title	Lyrics	Singer(s)	Length
1.	"Godari Gattu"	Bhaskarabhatla	Ramana Gogula, Madhu Priya	4:10
2.	"Meenu"	Anantha Sriram	Bheems Ceciroleo, Pranavi Acharya	4:45
3.	"Blockbuster Pongal"	Ramajogayya Sastry	Venkatesh, Bheems Ceciroleo, Rohini Soratt	3:09
4.	"Lallayire"	Raghuram	Bheems Ceciroleo	1:33
5.	"Guruvarya"	Anantha Sriram	Sri Krishna	3:32
6.	"Chinna Raju"	Anantha Sriram	Revathi Mannava, Madhavi Ravuri, Sudha	0:57

== Reception ==
Sangeetha Devi Dundoo of The Hindu opined that catchy songs, "Godari Gattu" in particular worked to the advantage of the film. India Today wrote that "the film benefits from Bheems Ceciroleo’s lively music and a strong background score that elevates several moments".
