= Julayi (soundtrack) =

- Album cover

Soundtrack album by Devi Sri Prasad
- Released: 6 July 2012
- Recorded: 2012
- Genre: Film soundtrack
- Length: 24:38
- Language: Telugu
- Label: Aditya Music
- Producer: Devi Sri Prasad

Devi Sri Prasad chronology
Gabbar Singh (2012)	Julayi (2012)	Dhamarukam (2012)

Julayi is the feature film soundtrack of the 2012 action comedy film of the same name starring Allu Arjun, Ileana D'Cruz, Sonu Sood and Rajendra Prasad. Directed by Trivikram Srinivas, the film's music and background score was composed by Devi Sri Prasad marking his second collaboration after Jalsa in 2008. The official soundtrack album consists of six songs composed by Devi Sri Prasad and Ramajogayya Sastry, Sri Mani and Devi Sri Prasad himself penning the lyrics. The film's soundtrack album was launched on 6 July 2012 in a grand promotional event at Hitex Exhibition Center in Madhapur, Hyderabad on Aditya Music label. The audio received positive response from both critics and audience alike.

== Production ==
Trivikram chose Devi Sri Prasad to compose music for this film post the success of the Soundtrack of Gabbar Singh which would mark his next collaboration with him after Jalsa in 2008 and Devi Sri Prasad's Fourth collaboration with Arjun after Arya, Bunny and Arya 2 in the past. Sri Mani, who was well known for his lyrics in the films 100% Love and Love Failure wrote 3 songs in the film. Devi Sri Prasad too penned lyrics for a song to which popular singer Adnan Sami provided the vocals. Its background music was used in the first teaser which received positive response.

== Release ==
The audio teaser was released on 26 June 2012 by the production house which raised expectations on the audio further. The soundtrack album was officially launched on 6 July 2012 at Hitex Exhibition Center in Madhapur, Hyderabad. Pawan Kalyan attended the function as the chief guest while Allu Arjun, Tamannaah, Dasari Narayana Rao, S. S. Rajamouli, Srinu Vytla, Sai Dharam Tej, Ali, Nagendra Babu, Dil Raju, Harish Shankar, B.V.S.N. Prasad attended the audio function.

In the UK, the BBC Asian Network radio station officially play listed the track O Madhu on 14 July 2012 marking it as the first Telugu song to be play listed there. In mid-July, the promotional music video of the song Pakado Pakado was released by Devi Sri Prasad in his Twitter, which was canned in Khurshid Jha Devdi College for Women, near Charminar, Hyderabad. The song featured a dance performance by Allu Arjun and Devi Sri Prasad and the vocals been sung only by Devi Sri Prasad while Malgudi Shubha too sang the song in the soundtrack album.

== Track listing ==
No.	Title	Lyrics	Singer(s)	Length
1.	"Nenu Pakka Julayi"	Ramajogayya Sastry	Suchith Suresan, Priya Himesh	4:22
2.	"O Madhu"	Devi Sri Prasad	Adnan Sami	4:05
3.	"Osey Osey"	Sri Mani	Jassie Gift	4:14
4.	"Hey Chakkani Bike Undi"	Sri Mani	Tippu, Megha	4:05
5.	"Mee Intiki Mundu"	Sri Mani	Sagar, Ranina Reddy	3:52
6.	"Pakado Pakado"	Ramajogayya Sastry	Malgudi Shubha, Devi Sri Prasad	4:00
Total length:				24:38

== Awards and nominations ==
Ceremony	Category	Nominee	Result
2nd South Indian International Movie Awards	Best Music Director (Telugu)	Devi Sri Prasad	Nominated
2nd South Indian International Movie Awards	Best Lyricist (Telugu)	Devi Sri Prasad - "O Madhu"	Nominated
2nd South Indian International Movie Awards	Best Male Playback Singer (Telugu)	Adnan Sami - "O Madhu"	Nominated
