= Godari Gattu =

2024 song by Bheems Ceciroleo, Bhaskarabhatla, Ramana Gogula and Madhu Priya

Single by Bheems Ceciroleo and Bhaskarabhatla featuring Ramana Gogula and Madhu Priya

from the album Sankranthiki Vasthunam
- Language: Telugu
- Released: 3 December 2024
- Recorded: 2024
- Genre: Dance; pop
- Length: 4:10
- Label: T-Series
- Composer: Bheems Ceciroleo
- Lyricist: Bhaskarabhatla
- Producer: Bheems Ceciroleo

Sankranthiki Vasthunam track listing
- 1. "Godari Gattu"; 2. "Meenu"; 3. "Blockbuster Pongal"

Music video
- "Godari Gattu" on YouTube

"Godari Gattu" (also known as "Godari Gattu Meedha") is an Indian Telugu-language song, composed by Bheems Ceciroleo, with lyrics written by Bhaskarabhatla, and recorded by Ramana Gogula and Madhu Priya for the soundtrack album of the 2025 Indian film Sankranthiki Vasthunam. It was released on 3 December 2024 (released on YouTube as a lyrical video song) as the first single from the album, through T-Series. The full video song, featuring visuals directly from the film, was released on 9 February 2025 on YouTube.

The vocals by Ramana Gogula and Madhu Priya made the song successful and peaked at number two on the Billboard India Songs. The film's success at the box office is also attributed to the popularity of the song.

== Background and composition ==
The song marked the comeback of singer Ramana Gogula, who had previously worked with Venkatesh eighteen years ago in Lakshmi (2006). Madhu Priya was hired as the female singer. Bhaskarabhatla had written the lyrics, making it a romantic melody.

== Music video ==
The music video is a direct clip from the scenes in Sankranthiki Vasthunam. The scenes feature Venkatesh and Aishwarya Rajesh as a couple dancing together. Dance sequences were choreographed by Bhanu Master.

== Commercial performance ==
Following the release in December 2024, the song received positive reception due to the vocals by Ramana Gogula and Madhu Priya. It garnered more than 50 million (5 crore) views within three weeks, one of the best for Telugu songs. It later had more than 340 million (34 crore) views combined, on YouTube. It debuted at nineteen on the Billboard India Songs, and peaked at number two.

== Credits and personnel ==
Credits adapted from YouTube.

- Bheems Ceciroleo – Composer
- Bhaskarabhatla – Lyricist
- Ramana Gogula – Vocals
- Madhu Priya – Vocals
- Bhanu Master – Choreographer
- Kalyan Chakravarthy – Rhythm
- Vaidhhy Vr – Keyboards and Additional Rhythm
- Vikas Badisa – Keyboards
- Suman Jeeva – Keyboards
- Yugandar Gattu – Flue
- Sandilya Pisapati – Violin
- Malya Kandukuri – Music Production Manager
- Mastan Vali – Chief Session Recording Engineer
- Shalem Kumar – Sound Engineer
- J Vinay Kumar – Mix engineer
- Shadab Rayeen – Mastering engineer
- Suresh Kumar Taddi – record engineer

== Charts ==
Weekly chart performance for "Peelings"
Chart (2024–2025)	Peak position
India (Billboard)	2
UK Asian Music Chart (OCC)	31
