= SIIMA Award for Best Male Playback Singer – Telugu =

- Awarded for: Best Male Playback Singer of a song in Telugu cinema
- Country: India
- Presented by: Vibri Media Group
- First award: 21 June 2012 (for films released in 2011)
- Most recent winner: Ramana Gogula, Sankranthiki Vasthunam (2025)

Highlights
- Most wins: Ram Miriyala (3)
- Most nominations: Kaala Bhairava and Sid Sriram (6)

SIIMA Award for Best Male Playback Singer – Telugu is presented by Vibri media group as part of its annual South Indian International Movie Awards, for the best male playback singer/vocalist of a Telugu film song. The award was first given in 2012 for songs and films released in 2011.

== Superlatives ==
Categories	Recipient	Notes
Most wins	Ram Miriyala	3
Most consecutive wins	Ram Miriyala	3 (2021–2023)
Most nominations	Sid Sriram	7
Most consecutive nominations	Sid Sriram	4 (2016–2019)
Most nominations without a win	Sid Sriram	7
Oldest winner	Ram Miriyala	Age 37 (12th SIIMA)
Youngest winner	Kaala Bhairava	Age 24 (7th SIIMA)
Oldest nominee	S. P. Balasubrahmanyam	Age 67 (2nd SIIMA)
Youngest nominee	Bharath Raj	(4th SIIMA)

== Winners ==
Year	Singer	Song	Film	Ref
2011	Rahul Nambiar	"Guruvaram March"	Dookudu	
2012	Thaman S	"Sir Osthara"	Businessman	
2013	Silambarasan	"Diamond Girl"	Baadshah	
2014	Simha	"Cinema Choopista"	Race Gurram	
2015	Sagar	"Jatha Kalise"	Srimanthudu	
2016	Sagar	"Sailaja Sailaja"	Nenu Sailaja	
2017	Kaala Bhairava	"Dandaalayya"	Baahubali 2: The Conclusion	
2018	Anurag Kulkarni	"Pillaa Raa"	RX 100	
2019	Anurag Kulkarni	"iSmart Theme"	ISmart Shankar	
2020	Armaan Malik	"Butta Bomma"	Ala Vaikunthapurramuloo	
2021	Ram Miriyala	"Chitti"	Jathi Ratnalu	
2022	Ram Miriyala	"Tillu Anna DJ Pedithe"	DJ Tillu	
2023	Ram Miriyala	"Ooru Palletooru"	Balagam	
2024	Shankarr Babu Kandukoori	"Peelings"	Pushpa 2: The Rule	
2025	Ramana Gogula	"Godari Gattu"	Sankranthiki Vasthunam	

== Nominations ==
- 2011: Rahul Nambiar – "Guruvaram March" from Dookudu
  - Adnan Sami – "Infatuation" from 100% Love
  - Yuvan Shankar Raja – "Panjaa" from Panjaa
  - Hemachandra – "Prema Desam" from Shakthi
  - S. P. Balasubrahmanyam – "Jagadananda Karaka" from Sri Rama Rajyam
- 2012: Thaman S – "Sir Osthara" from Businessman
  - Adnan Sami – "O Madhu" from Julai
  - Shankar Mahadevan – "Akasam Ammayaithe" from Gabbar Singh
  - S. P. Balasubrahmanyam – "Jaruguthunnaadi" from Krishnam Vande Jagadgurum
  - Hemachandra – "Oka Padam" from Racha
- 2013: Silambarasan – "Diamond Girl" from Baadshah
  - Haricharan – "Padipoya" from DK Bose
  - Anup Rubens – "Gunde Jaari Gallanthayyinde" from Gunde Jaari Gallanthayyinde
  - Shankar Mahadevan – "Baapu Gaari" from Attarintiki Daredi
  - Daler Mehndi – "Banthi Poola Janaki" from Baadshah
- 2014: Simha – "Cinema Chupista Maava" from Race Gurram
  - Arijit Singh – "Kanulanu Thake" from Manam
  - Master Bharath Raj – "Kanipenchina Maa Ammake" from Manam
  - Devi Sri Prasad – "Who Are You" from 1: Nenokkadine
  - Gold Devaraj – "Bujjimaa" from Run Raja Run
- 2015: Sagar – "Jatha Kalise" from Srimanthudu
  - Dhanunjay Seepana, Haricharan – "Bhaje Bhaaje" from Gopala Gopala
  - M. M. Keeravani – "Nippule Shwasaga" from Baahubali: The Beginning
  - Raghu Dixit – "Jaago Jaago Re" from Srimanthudu
  - Sonu Nigam – "Needhe Needhe" from Gopala Gopala
- 2016: Sagar – "Sailaja Sailaja" from Nenu Sailaja
  - Devi Sri Prasad – "Nannaku Prematho" from Nannaku Prematho
  - Shankar Mahadevan – "Pranaamam" from Janatha Garage
  - Sid Sriram – "Vellipomakey" from Sahasam Swasaga Sagipo
  - Vijay Yesudas – "Evare" from Premam
- 2017: Kaala Bhairava – "Dandaalayya" from Baahubali 2: The Conclusion
  - Armaan Malik – "Hello" from Hello
  - Devi Sri Prasad – "Ammadu Lets Do Kummudu" from Khaidi No. 150
  - Hemachandra – "Oosupodhu" from Fidaa
  - Sid Sriram – "Adiga Adiga" from Ninnu Kori
- 2018: Anurag Kulkarni - "Pillaa Raa" from RX 100
  - Kaala Bhairava – "Peniviti" from Aravinda Sametha Veera Raghava
  - Kailash Kher – "Vochadayyo Saami" from Bharat Ane Nenu
  - Rahul Sipligunj – "Ranga Ranga" from Rangasthalam
  - Sid Sriram – "Inkem Inkem" from Geetha Govindam
- 2019: Anurag Kulkarni – "iSmart Theme" from ISmart Shankar
  - Shankar Mahadevan – "Padara Padara" from Maharshi
  - M. L. R. Karthikeyan – "Thandaane Thandaane" from Vinaya Vidheya Rama
  - Sid Sriram – "Aarerey Manasa" from Falaknuma Das
  - Sudharshan Ashok – "Prema Vennala" from Chitralahari
- 2020: Armaan Malik – "Butta Bomma" from Ala Vaikunthapurramuloo
  - Shankar Mahadevan – "Sarileru Neekevvaru Anthem" from Sarileru Neekevvaru
  - Kaala Bhairava – "Tharagathi Gadhi" from Colour Photo
  - Pradeep Kumar – "The Life of Ram" from Jaanu
  - Raghu Kunche – "Nakkileesu Golusu" from Palasa 1978
- 2021: Ram Miriyala – "Chitti" from Jathi Ratnalu
  - Sid Sriram – "Srivalli" from Pushpa: The Rise
  - Anurag Kulkarni – "Nee Chitram Choosi" from Love Story
  - Javed Ali, Sreekanth Chandra – "Nee Kannu Neeli Samudram" from Uppena
  - Penchal Das – "Bhalegundi Baalaa" from Sreekaram
- 2022: Ram Miriyala – "Tillu Anna DJ Pedithe" from DJ Tillu
  - Kaala Bhairava – "Komuram Bheemudo" from RRR
  - Sid Sriram – "Kalaavathi" from Sarkaru Vaari Paata
  - S. P. Charan – "Oh Sita Hey Rama" from Sita Ramam
  - Rahul Sipligunj, Kaala Bhairava – "Naatu Naatu" from RRR
- 2023: Ram Miriyala – "Ooru Palletooru" from Balagam
  - Adithya RK, Leon James – "Almost Padipoyindhe Pilla" from Das Ka Dhamki
  - Anurag Kulkarni – "Samayama" from Hi Nanna
  - Rahul Sipligunj – "Ayyayyo" from Mem Famous
  - Sid Sriram – "Aradhya" from Kushi
- 2024: Shankarr Babu Kandukoori – "Peelings" from Pushpa 2: The Rule
  - Gowra Hari – "Poolamme Pilla" from Hanu-Man
  - Kaala Bhairava – "Ayudha Pooja" from Devara: Part 1
  - Karthik – "Kalyani Vaccha Vacchaa" from The Family Star
  - Ram Miriyala – "Ticket Eh Konakunda" from Tillu Square
- 2025: Ramana Gogula – "Godari Gattu" from Sankranthiki Vasthunam
  - Anurag Kulkarni – "Rambai Neemeedha Naku" from Raju Weds Rambai
  - Armaan Malik – "Vibe Undi" from Mirai
  - Dhanush – "Poyiraa Mama" from Kuberaa
  - Javed Ali – "Bujji Thalli" from Thandel

== See also ==
- SIIMA Award for Best Female Playback Singer – Telugu
