= Sekhar Chandra =

Indian cricketer

Personal information
- Full name: Sekhar Chandra
- Born: India

Sekhar Chandra was an Indian cricketer who played for Himachal Pradesh.

Chandra made a single List A appearance for the side, during the 1994–95 season, against Jammu and Kashmir. From the lower order, he scored 4 runs. While Jammu and Kashmir won the match, the points accrued from the game were later annulled.
