= Uppena (soundtrack) =

2021 soundtrack album by Devi Sri Prasad

Soundtrack album by Devi Sri Prasad
- Released: 5 February 2021
- Recorded: 2019–2020
- Genre: Feature film soundtrack
- Length: 27:09
- Language: Telugu
- Label: Aditya Music
- Producer: Devi Sri Prasad

Devi Sri Prasad chronology
Alludu Adhurs (2021)	Uppena (2021)	Rang De (2021)
External audio
- Audio Jukebox on YouTube

Singles from Uppena
- 1. "Nee Kallu Neeli Samudram" Released: 2 March 2020; 2. "Dhak Dhak Dhak" Released: 9 March 2020; 3. "Ranguladhukkuna" Released: 11 November 2020; 4. "Jala Jala Jalapaatham Nuvvu" Released: 31 January 2021

Uppena is the soundtrack album composed by Devi Sri Prasad for the 2021 Indian Telugu-language film of the same name starring Panja Vaisshnav Tej and Krithi Shetty in lead roles, directed by Bucchi Babu Sana. The album consists of eight songs with Sri Mani, Devi Sri Prasad, Chandrabose and Raqueeb Alam penning the lyrics. On 17 February 2021, the soundtrack album was released digitally on the Aditya Music label. "Nee Kannu Neeli Samudram" and "Jala Jala Jalapaatham Nuvvu" are the biggest hits of the album. After a brief setback, Devi Sri Prasad reclaimed success through the album.

== Background and development ==
Sukumar's regular collaborator Devi Sri Prasad was signed on to compose the film's soundtrack album and background score. The film marks their eighth collaboration, after producing popular albums such as 100% Love and Rangasthalam. Music sessions of the film began in February 2020. For the first time, Devi used qawwali-inspired music for the track "Nee Kannu Neeli Samudram".

== Release ==
The soundtrack album features eight tracks. A glimpse of the first single "Nee Kannu Neeli Samudram" was unveiled on 1 March 2020, and the full song was released by Aditya Music the following day, on 2 March 2020. The song was penned by Sri Mani with Hindi lyrics were written by Raqueeb Alam and sung by Javed Ali and Srikanth Chandra. The second single "Dhak Dhak Dhak" was released on 9 March 2020, which was written by Chandrabose and sung by Sarath Santhosh and Hari Priya. On 11 November 2020, Mahesh Babu unveiled the third single "Ranguladhukkuna" through social media platforms. Sung by Yazin Nizar and Hari Priya, it is touted to be a soothing melody number. The fourth song "Jala Jala Jalapaatham Nuvvu" sung by Jaspreet Jasz and Shreya Ghoshal, was released by Vijay Devarakonda on 31 January 2021. Full video version of "Nee Kannu Neeli Samudram" was released on 6 February 2021. In April 2021, two deleted songs - "Ravoyi" and "Jeebu Garu Sundaramma" - were released in the Mythri Movie Makers YouTube channel.

=== Marketing ===
Pre-release event of the film was held on 7 February 2021 where several artistes performed the eight songs of the album. The soundtrack album was released on 17 February 2021 during the success meet of the film at Rajahmundry, Andhra Pradesh, India.

== Track listing ==
Original Motion Picture Track List
No.	Title	Lyrics	Singer(s)	Length
1.	"Nee Kannu Neeli Samudram"	Sri Mani, Raqueeb Alam	Javed Ali, Sreekanth Chandra	5:12
2.	"Dhak Dhak Dhak"	Chandrabose	Sarath Santosh, Hari Priya	1:45
3.	"Ranguladhukkuna"	Sri Mani	Yazin Nizar, Hari Priya	4:23
4.	"Jala Jala Jalapaatham Nuvvu"	Sri Mani	Shreya Ghoshal, Jaspreet Jasz	4:13
5.	"Eswara"	Chandrabose	Devi Sri Prasad	3:28
6.	"Sandram Lone Neerantha"	Devi Sri Prasad	Sean Roldan	3:58
7.	"Ninne Naa Ninne"	Chandrabose	Sameera Bharadwaj	1:28
8.	"Silaka Silaka"	Sri Mani	Kailash Kher	3:26
Total length:				27:09

== Reception ==
On a whole, the album has streams of over 400 million (40 crore) views. Cinematography of the song "Jala Jala Jalapaatham Nuvvu" was praised. Shreya Ghoshal, Jaspreet Jasz, Javed Ali, Devi Sri Prasad and Sreekanth Chandra received positive response for their performance in the soundtrack album.

=== Critics ===
123Telugu wrote that "Devi Sri Prasad blends the Aalap style with his mainstream modern music to bring out this soothing as well as a somewhat boisterous melody. Yazin Nizar and Haripriya effectively bring out the unconventional mindset of the lovers that the lyrics project in Ranguladdhukunna. DSP chooses a female singer with an ultra-soft voice for a reason."

IndiaGlitz stated "Devi Sri Prasad blends the Aalap style with his mainstream modern music to bring out this soothing as well as a somewhat boisterous melody. Srikanth Chandra's Hindi vocals kick off the song, with Javed Ali taking the baton forward with melodic ease. Shreemani's lyrics are full of life. The line 'Nee oohale, oopiraina picchodini, nee oopire praanamaina pilladini' of Nee Kannu Neeli Samudram song is high in terms of touching meaning. An appropriate song that positions 'Uppena' as a musical love story laced with intense emotions." Writing to Idlebrain.com, Jeevi praised DSP's work and said that "Devi Sri Prasad deserves a huge pat for his outstanding music for the songs in this film." Another critic cited it as a "musical hit".

=== Audience ===
The album received predominantly positive response from audiences. Upon the release of lyrical version the first track "Nee Kannu Neeli Samudram" on the video-sharing platform YouTube on 2 March 2020, it has more than 215 million (21.5 crore) views as of May 2021. It was featured on the national music charts of the year and was one of the most streamed Telugu songs of the year. "Jala Jala Jalapaatham Nuvvu", which was released on 31 January 2021, received wide response. Within a short period, it made its debut on national music charts in February. It has more streams on platforms such as Spotify, JioSaavn, Wynk Music, Gaana, etc. than the regular popular platform YouTube. The track also became one of the most streamed songs in Spotify, a week during its release. Another devotional-style track "Eswara" written by Chandrabose and performed by Devi Sri Prasad was released on 6 February 2021. The track got good response, especially for the vocals performed by DSP.

== Album credits ==
Credits adapted from Aditya Music

=== Producer(s) ===
Devi Sri Prasad

=== Songwriter(s) ===
- Devi Sri Prasad (Composer, Arranger)
- Sri Mani, Chandrabose and Raqueeb Alam (lyrics)

=== Performer(s) ===
Javed Ali, Devi Sri Prasad, Sreekanth Chandra, Sarath Santosh, Hari Priya, Yazin Nizar, Sameera Bharadwaj, Shreya Ghoshal, Jaspreet Jasz, Sean Roldan, Kailash Kher

=== Musician(s) ===
- Keyboards – Vikas Badisa, KP, Chaitu Kolli, Suresh Kumar Taddi
- Rhythm – Kalyan
- Frets – Subhani
- Accordiom – Rajkumar
- Esraj – Saroja
- Chorus – Shenbagaraj, Santosh Hariharan, Vignesh Narayanan, Saisharan, Akkala Udaykumar, T. Uday Kumar, Deepti, Veena, Haripriya, Deepak, Narayana, Hari, J. Chitty Prakash Rao
- Violin – Balaji
- Flute – Kiran Kumar
- Live Strings Conducted by – J Chittey Prakash Rao
- Live Strings performed by – CMU Orchestra, Chennai and Chennai Cine Musicians Union Orchestra, Chennai
- Melodica – Devi Sri Prasad
- Guitar – Godfray Immanuel, Mani
- Harmony – Vocal Arranger- Roe Vincent
- Kazoo – Devi Sr Prasad

=== Sound Engineers ===
- Brindavan–The Garden Of Music - A. Uday Kumar
- Kutty Uday
- Suresh Kumar

=== Personnel ===
- Orchestra In-Charge – Murugan
- Studio Assistants – Pugalendhi, Dhinakaran and Raja
- Album Co-ordinator – B. Manikandan

=== Production ===
- Mixed & Mastered by – A. Uday Kumar @ Brindavan–The Garden Of Music
- Recorded by – A. Uday Kumar, T. Uday Kumar and Suresh Kumar Taddi.

Music label - Aditya Music Pvt. Ltd.
