= Geetha Madhuri =

Indian singer (born 1989)

- Born: Geetha Madhuri; 24 August 1989 (age 36); Palakollu, Andhra Pradesh, India
- Occupations: Singer, Composer, Dubbing artist
- Years active: 2005–present
- Spouse: Nandu

Geetha Madhuri is an Indian playback singer and voice artist. Madhuri has sung over 2500 songs in several languages including Telugu, Hindi, Tamil, Kannada and Malayalam. She is the recipient of numerous Nandi Awards and Filmfare Awards.

== Personal life ==
Madhuri was born to Prabhakar Sastry, a State Bank of India official, and Lakshmi. Madhuri is their only daughter. Her family moved from Palakollu, West Godavari District to Hyderabad when she was very young.

Madhuri was educated at Loyala Model High School, Vanasthalipuram and Little Flower Junior College. She graduated with a B Com at Aurora College. She was trained in classical and light music by Kocharlakota Padmavati and Ramachari. Madhuri made her debut as a playback singer with Kulasekhar's film Premalekha Rasa.

Madhuri married actor Nandu in 2014. The couple has a daughter and son.

== Awards and nominations ==
Year	Award	Category	Song name	Work	Result
2008	CineMAA Awards	Best Female Playback Singer	Chamka Chamka	Chirutha	Won
2008	Nandi Awards	Best Female Playback Singer	Ninne Ninne	Nachavule	Won
2008	Filmfare Awards South	Best Female Playback Singer – Telugu	Ninne Ninne	Nachavule	Nominated
2009	Santosham Film Awards	Best Female Playback Singer	Ninne Ninne	Nachavule	Won
2010	Filmfare Awards South	Best Female Playback Singer – Telugu	Magallu Vatti Maayagallu	Golimaar	Won
2010	South Scope Awards	Best Female Playback Singer – Telugu	Gundello Guitar	Ek Niranjan	Won
2010	Santosham Film Awards	Best Female Playback Singer – Telugu	Gundello Guitar	Ek Niranjan	Won
2012	Nandi Awards	Best Female Playback Singer	Yedhalo Nadhilaga	Good Morning	Won
2012	South Indian International Movie Awards	Best Female Playback Singer – Telugu	Melikalu	Cameraman Gangatho Rambabu	Won
2012	Filmfare Awards South	Best Female Playback Singer – Telugu	Vechani Vaisundira	Gundello Godari	Nominated
2013	South Indian International Movie Awards	Best Female Playback Singer – Telugu	Top Lechipoddi	Iddarammayilatho	Nominated
2013	Radio Mirchi Music Awards	Best Female Playback Singer	Darlinge	Mirchi	Won
2014	Gulf Andhra Music Awards	Best Female Playback Singer	Darlinge	Mirchi	Won
2015	Filmfare Awards South	Best Female Playback Singer – Telugu	Jeevanadhi	Baahubali: The Beginning	Won
2015	Santosham Film Awards	Best Female Playback Singer	Jeevanadhi	Baahubali: The Beginning	Won
2016	IIFA Utsavam	Best Female Playback Singer – Telugu	Jeeva Nadhi	Baahubali: The Beginning	Nominated
2016	South Indian International Movie Awards	Best Female Playback Singer – Telugu	Pakka Local	Janatha Garage	Nominated
2016	IIFA Utsavam	Best Female Playback Singer – Tamil	Jeeva Nadhi	Baahubali: The Beginning	Won
2017	South Indian International Movie Awards	Best Female Playback Singer – Telugu	Mahanubhavudu	Mahanubhavudu	Nominated
2017	IIFA Utsavam	Best Female Playback Singer – Telugu	Pakka Local	Janatha Garage	Won
2017	Filmfare Awards South	Best Female Playback Singer – Telugu	Mahanubhavudu	Mahanubhavudu	Nominated
2017	Zee Apsara Award	Best Female Playback Singer	Pakka Local	Janatha Garage	Won
2017	TFN Award	Best Female Playback Singer	Pakka Local	Janatha Garage	Won
2017	Sankarabharanam Award	Best Female Playback Singer	Pakka Local	Janatha Garage	Won
2018	Zee Apsara Award	Best Female Playback Singer	Deo Deo	PSV Garuda Vega	Won
2018	Zee Apsara Award	Best Female Playback Singer	Mahanubhavudu	Mahanubhavudu	Nominated
2022	South Indian International Movie Awards	Best Female Playback Singer – Telugu	Jai Balayya	Akhanda	Won

=== Other Awards ===
- Swara Saraswathi Award from Andhra Pradesh

== Discography ==
Year	Song	Film	Language	Composer	Co-singers
2025	"Dawath"	Constable	Telugu	Subhash Anand	
2025	"Idena Idena"	Nidurinchu Jahapana	Telugu	Anup Rubens	
2024	"Guvva Gootilo"	Swag	Telugu	Vivek Sagar	Mano, Snigdha Sharma
2024	"Chandamaama Kathalonaa"	Operation Raavan	Telugu	Saravana Vasudevan	Haricharan
2023	"Chedu Nijam"	Hi Nanna	Telugu	Hesham Abdul Wahab	Vineeth Sreenivasan
2023	"Neekemo Andamekkuva"	Waltair Veerayya	Telugu	Devi Sri Prasad	Mika Singh, Velmurugan
2022	"Coka 2.0"	Liger	Tamil	Jaani, Lijo George-DJ Chetas	Ram Miriyala
2022	"Coka 2.0"	Liger	Telugu	Jaani, Lijo George-DJ Chetas	Ram Miriyala
2022	"Bongu Bongu"	Nuvve Naa Pranam	Telugu	Mani Zenna	
2022	"Life Ante Itta Vundaala"	F3	Telugu	Devi Sri Prasad	Rahul Sipligunj
2022	"Na Ooru Peddapuram"	Jagannatakam	Telugu	V Kiran Kumara	
2022	"Saana Kastam"	Acharya	Telugu	Mani Sharma	Revanth
2021	"Vaddaanam"	Varudu Kaavalenu	Telugu	Vishal Chandrashekhar, S. Thaman	ML Gayathri, Aditi Bhavaraju, Sruthi Ranjani, Sri Krishna
2021	"Aracheye O Aayudhamaithe"	Minnal Murali (dubbed version)	Telugu	Shaan Rahman, Sushin Shyam	PVLN Murthy
2021	"Jai Balayya"	Akhanda	Telugu	S. Thaman	Sahithi Chaganti, Satya Yamini, Aditi Bhavaraju
2020	"Super Machi"	S/O Satyamurthy (dubbed version)	Kannada	Devi Sri Prasad	Vinayak
2020	"Pennu Paper"	S/O Satyamurthy (dubbed version)	Kannada	Devi Sri Prasad	Venky, Pavani
2020	"Pataki Poriyo"	K3 Kotikokkadu	Telugu	Arjun Janya	
2019	"Tikka Regina"	Sakala Kala Vallabhudu	Telugu	Ajay Patnaik	
2019	"Raro Naa Suri"	Nuvvu Thopu Raa	Telugu	Suresh Bobbili	
2019	"Mr.KK"	Mr. KK (dubbed version)	Telugu	Ghibran	
2019	"Thakita Thakita"	Prati Roju Pandage	Telugu	S. Thaman	Rahul Sipligunj
2018	"Andala Kalala"	Gharana Mogudu	Telugu	Arjun	
2018	"Chirugaali Cheppave"	Gharana Mogudu	Telugu	Sai Srinivas	
2017	"Android In Apple Phone"	Poraatam	Telugu	Harish-Sathish	
2017	"Deo Deo"	PSV Garuda Vega	Telugu	Bheems Ceciroleo	
2017	"Akkada Vunnavadu"	Spyder	Telugu	Harris Jayaraj	
2017	"Mahanubhavudu"	Mahanubhavudu	Telugu	S. Thaman	M. M. Manasi
2017	"Box Baddhalai Poye"	DJ	Telugu	Devi Sri Prasad	Sagar
2017	"Paapi Kondallo"	Fashion Designer s/o Ladies Tailor	Telugu	Mani Sharma	
2017	"The Queen of Dhaba"	Oxygen	Telugu	Yuvan Shankar Raja	
2017	"Nadi Dhanakshetram"	Head Constable Venkataramaiah	Telugu	Vandemataram Srinivas	
2017	"Unda Gnapakamunda"	Head Constable Venkataramaiah	Telugu	Vandemataram Srinivas	
2017	"Padhamari"	Paisa Vasool	Telugu	Anup Rubens	
2016	"Pakka Local"	Janatha Garage	Telugu	Devi Sri Prasad	
2016	"Shivalinga"	Shivalinga (dubbed version)	Telugu	SS Thaman	
2016	"Rangu Rakkara"	Shivalinga (dubbed version)	Telugu	SS Thaman	
2016	"Shivalinga"	Shivalinga	Tamil	SS Thaman	
2016	"Rangu Rakkara"	Shivalinga	Tamil	SS Thaman	
2016	"Hypare Hypare"	Hyper	Telugu	Ghibran	
2016	"Dance Chey Mazaga"	Abhinetri	Telugu	Sajid–Wajid	
2016	"Hollywood Hero Lekka"	Speedunnodu	Telugu	Sri Vasanth	
2016	"Tingo Tingo"	Dictator	Telugu	SS Thaman	
2016	"Sarrainodu"	Sarrainodu	Telugu	S. S. Thaman	Hard Kaur, Sonu Kakkar, Brijesh Shandilya
2016	"Door Number"	Oopiri	Telugu	Gopi Sundar	
2016	"Door Number"	Thozha	Tamil	Gopi Sundar	
2016	"Konaseema"	Tuntari	Telugu	Sai Karthik	
2016	"Dhimmathirigae"	Srimanthudu	Telugu	Devi Sri Prasad	
2016	"Pee Pee Dum Dum"	Chuttalabbayi	Telugu	SS Thaman	
2016	"Dhum Dhum"	Chuttalabbayi	Telugu	SS Thaman	
2015	"Jeevanadhi"	Baahubali: The Beginning	Telugu	MM Keeravani	
2015	"Jeevanadhi"	Baahubali: The Beginning	Tamil	MM Keeravani	
2015	"Jeevanadhi"	Baahubali: The Beginning (dubbed version)	Malayalam	MM Keeravani	
2015	"Ittage Recchipodham"	Temper	Telugu	Anup Rubens	
2015	"Sanivaram Chempaku"	Lava Kusa (2015 film)	Telugu	Ram Narayan	
2015	"One and only Lion"	Lion	Telugu	Mani Sharma	
2014	"Pandaga Chesko"	Pandaga Chesko	Telugu	SS Thaman	
2014	"Rakkasa Rakkasa"	Naa Kantu Okaru	Telugu	Pramod Kumar	
2014	"Chilipi Cheema"	Venu Gopala Krishna	Telugu	Chaithanya	
2014	"Alexander"	Eduruleni Alexander	Telugu	Dr. Josyabatla Sarma	
2013	"Nakallu Chudu"	Kaalicharan	Telugu	Nandan Raj	
2013	"Darlingey"	Mirchi	Telugu	Devi Sri Prasad	
2013	"Top Lesipoddi"	Iddarammayilatho	Telugu	Devi Sri Prasad	Sagar
2013	"Ninnu Choodukunda"	Dhenikaina Ready	Telugu	Chakri	
2013	"Aibaaboi Nee Choopu"	Bhai	Telugu	Devi Sri Prasad	
2013	"Baadshah"	Baadshah	Telugu	SS Thaman	
2013	"Super Figure"	Potugadu	Telugu	Achu Rajamani	
2013	"Yaevaindho"	Balapu	Telugu	SS Thaman	
2013	"Rara Venu"	Pavitra	Telugu	M. M. Srilekha	
2013	"Tenekaina Teepi Telusunaa"	Panchami	Sri Kothi		
2012	"Eno Modi"	Kanasali Jotheyali	Kannada	Bobby Arey, LN Goochi	
2012	"Manasu Doche"	Dil Se	Telugu	Bigi Bal, Anandraj	
2012	"O My God"	Bodyguard	Telugu	SS Thaman	
2012	"Dibiri Dibiri"	Genius	Telugu	Joswa Sridhar	Priya Himesh
2012	"Nanna Hesaru "	Kanasali Jotheyali	Kannada	Bobby Arey, LN Goochi	
2012	"Ruler"	Dhammu	Telugu	MM Keeravani	
2012	"Dillaku Dillaku"	Racha	Telugu	Mani Sharma	
2012	"Melikalu"	Cameraman Gangatho Rambabu	Telugu	Mani Sharma	
2012	"Jillelamma Jitta"	Ryee Ryee	Telugu	Sri Vasanth	
2012	"Bad Boyz"	Businessman	Telugu	S. Thaman	Priya Himesh
2012	"Bad Boyz"	Businessman (Malayalam dubbed)	Malayalam	S. Thaman	
2012	"Zara Zara"	Sudigadu	Telugu	Sree Vasanth	
2011	"Chiranjeeva"	Badrinath	Telugu	MM Keeravani	
2011	"Paravaledhu"	Manasara	Telugu	Shekar Chandra	
2011	"Ettantee Mogudu"	Mogudu	Telugu	Babu Shankar	
2011	"Manasuloni"	Yuvan Yuvathi dubbed version (Dear)	Telugu	Vijay Antony	
2011	"Love me Love me"	Mayagadu	Telugu	Chakri	
2010	"Now Or Ever"	Vedam	Telugu	MM Keeravani	
2010	"Raja Raja Ravi Teja"	Don Seenu	Telugu	Mani Sharma	
2010	"Endukamma Prema Prema"	Gaayam 2	Telugu	Illayaraja	
2010	"Bava Bava"	Shambo Shiva Shambo	Telugu	Sundar C. Babu	
2010	"Nee Akunene"	Brammagadi Katha	Telugu	Koti	
2010	"Telugammayi"	Maryada Ramanna	Telugu	MM Keeravani	
2010	"Chinnadh Vaipu"	Brindavanam	Telugu	SS Thaman	Shankar Mahadevan, Shreya Ghoshal
2010	"Raaye Raaye"	Maryada Ramanna	Telugu	M. M. Keeravani	
2010	'"Innalloo"	Ala Modalaindi	Telugu	Kalyani Malik	
2010	"Dayi Dayi Chandari"	Anjani Puthrudu	Telugu	Vandemataram Srinivas	
2010	"Sri Anjaneyam"	Anjani Puthrudu	Telugu	Vandemataram Srinivas	
2010	"Ne Lookkeste Luckele"	Panchakshari	Telugu	Chinna	
2010	"Maenti Mahalakshmi"	Betting Bangaraju	Telugu	Sekhar Chandra	
2010	"Magallu"	Golimar	Telugu	Chakri	
2010	"Konte Choopulu"	Shambo Shiva Shambo	Telugu	Pradeep Koneru	
2010	"Nagara Nagara"	Baava	Telugu	Chakri	
2010	"Laali Paaduthunnadi"	Jhummandi Naadam	Telugu	MM Keeravani	
2010	"Ottedhunane Chuttedhuna"	Srimannarayana	Telugu	Chakri	
2010	"Endukila"	Rama Rama Krishna Krishna	Telugu	MM Keeravani	
2009	"Dheera Dheera"	Magadheera	Telugu	MM Keeravani	
2009	"Jorse Jorse"	Magadheera	Telugu	MM Keeravani	
2009	"Ike Repe Pelli"	Rowdigari Pellam	Telugu	Arjun	
2009	"Na Kosam"	Magadheera	Telugu	MM Keeravani	Deepu
2009	"Bholo Ashta lakshmi"	Ragada	Telugu	SS Thaman	
2009	"Gundello"	Ek Niranjan	Telugu	Mani Sharma	
2008	"Sri Sri Sri Rajadhi Raja"	Pandurangadu	Telugu	MM Keeravani	
2008	"Idhi Adhe"	Gunde Jhallumandi	Telugu	MM Keeravani	
2008	"Puduthuney Uyyala""	Neninte	Telugu	Chakri	
2008	"Telusa Manasa"	Gunde Jhallumandi	Telugu	MM Keeravani	
2008	"Nee Nuduti"	Gunde Jhallumandi	Telugu	MM Keeravani	
2008	"Illa Endukoutondi"	Gunde Jhallumandi	Telugu	MM Keeravani	
2008	"Ninne Ninne"	Nachavale	Telugu	Sekhar Chandra	
2008	"Aaja Mehabooba"	Krishnarjuna	Telugu	MM Keeravani	
2007	"Chamka Chamka"	Chirutha	Mani Sharma		

=== Devotional songs ===
Song	Album	Language
"Govinda Namalu"	Govinda Namalu	Telugu
"Kotimanmathakaara"	Sarvam Bhaktimayam	Telugu
"Madhuram Sri Shirdi Sai"	Sri Shirdi Sai	Telugu
"Naadho Needho"	Sri Shirdi Sai	Telugu
"Muddula Ayyappa"	Ayyappa	Telugu
"Swamy Sri Subramanya"	Sarvam Bhaktimayam	Telugu
"Mamatalanni "	Sarvam Bhaktimayam	Telugu
"Kailasagirisa Eesha "	Sarvam Bhaktimayam	Telugu
"Tandari Nimpamu"	TCG	Telugu
"Aparanze Kante ne prema"	TCG	Telugu
"Sthuthiyu Mahima "	TCG	Telugu
"Yesuni Namamulo"	Feeling	Telugu
"Idhi Subhodayam"	TCG	Telugu
"Inyellu Ilalo"	TCG	Telugu
"Thygamantha chesavu dev"	TCG	Telugu
"Adivo Alladhivo"	Annamayya Vinnapalu	Telugu
"Sai Baba Harthi"	Baba Harthi	Telugu

=== Independent songs ===
Song	Album	Language
"Cinema Chance"	Pen	Telugu
"Ninnu Kori"	Amogha	Telugu
"DJ"	DJ	Telugu
"Sankaranthi Special song"	Sankaranthi Sambaralu	Telugu
"Chaitra Sudha"	Ugadhi Special	Telugu
"Baahuballi Lantodu"	Fans Special	Telugu
"Na Suruku saruku"	Hostel	Telugu
"Sirimallipovva"	Jhanki Trubute	Telugu
"Ugadi Song"	Ugadi Song	Telugu
"Vache Vache Ugadi"	Ugadi Special	Telugu
"Rukmini"	-	Telugu
