= Khushi Murali =

- Born: Korivi Muralidhar; 1963; Renigunta, Chittoor district, Andhra Pradesh
- Died: 11 January 2013 (aged 49–50)
- Occupation: playback singer
- Children: Sai Venkat, Haripriya

Korivi Muralidhar, popularly known as Khushi Murali (1963 – 11 January 2013), was an Indian playback singer. He became popular as a result of his hit song "Aadavari Matalaku" from the movie, Kushi.

== Life ==
He was born in Renigunta in Chittoor district. He moved to Chennai for opportunities in the film industry.

He sang over 500 film songs and 1,000 devotional songs for private albums in his career over two decades. His daughter Haripriya is also a playback singer.

== Death ==
He died on 11 January 2013 of a heart attack. He was on his way to perform at Kakinada Beach Festival.
