= Karthik Srinivasan =

Indian consultant and music critic

- Citizenship: Indian
- Occupations: Communications strategy consultant; Music critic; Blogger
- Years active: 1999–present
- Children: 2
- Website: beastoftraal.com itwofs.com milliblog.com

Karthik Srinivasan (/kɑːrθɪk sriːnɪvɑːsən/) is an Indian communications strategy consultant, music critic and blogger. He is the founder of the website ItwoFS, which tracks plagiarism in Indian film music, and Milliblog, where he reviews music albums.

== Career ==
In 1999, Karthik began his career as a critic for The Music Magazine, a defunct online magazine in Bengaluru, Karnataka. Later the same year, he founded ItwoFS (pronounced /aɪtuːɛfɛs/ eye-too-ef-es), a website that tracks plagiarism in Indian film music. Karthik says the initialism IIFS, from which the website name derives, can stand either for "Inspirations in Indian Film Songs", or "Inspired Indian Film Songs". In 2005, he founded the music review website Milliblog, where he reviews music albums within 100 words. The name of the blog was derived from Milliways, a restaurant featuring in the science fiction series The Hitchhiker's Guide to the Galaxy. Despite beginning his career in music reviewing, Karthik revealed he has no formal training in the same. Nonetheless, the popularity of Milliblog meant that he got to write for various publications such as Bangalore Mirror, The Hindu, The New Indian Express and Film Companion.

In 2008, Karthik created his first "work-related blog", Beast of Traal, that is about Indian corporates and brands. The name of this blog is an homage to a character from The Hitchhiker's Guide to the Galaxy. In 2009, Karthik was appointed as the head of digital strategy at Edelman India. In mid-June 2013, Milliblog crashed, although he was able to restore the website with the help of Yahoo. In November 2013, Karthik became the national lead of Ogilvy & Mather in India. He previously served as AVP of Corporate Communications at Flipkart. Karthik's LinkedIn profile was, between 2015 and 2017, the most viewed under "marketing and advertisement/communication". Karthik left Ogilvy & Mather in March 2018, and has been self-employed since. In 2019, he authored a book on self-branding, titled Be Social: Building Brand You Online.

== Accolades ==
In 2015, Karthik won two awards: the Best Media Innovation- Social Media award at Emvie 2015, and Interactive- Creative Use of Data award (bronze) at the DMA Asia Echo Awards.

== Personal life ==
Karthik's native language is Tamil. He speaks English, Hindi and Tamil fluently, has a general understanding of Kannada and Malayalam, and limited of Telugu. Karthik studied in college in Salem, Tamil Nadu. He has been residing in Bengaluru for several years, is married and has two children. Karthik has stated that during his formative years he suffered from stammering, and medical treatments proved futile. Realising this was a mental issue rather than a physical one, he decided to pursue a career in corporate communication to overcome his issues. In 2025, Karthik discovered he had two arterial blocks, necessitating angioplasty and the insertion of two stents.
