= Bhaskarabhatla =

Telugu lyricist

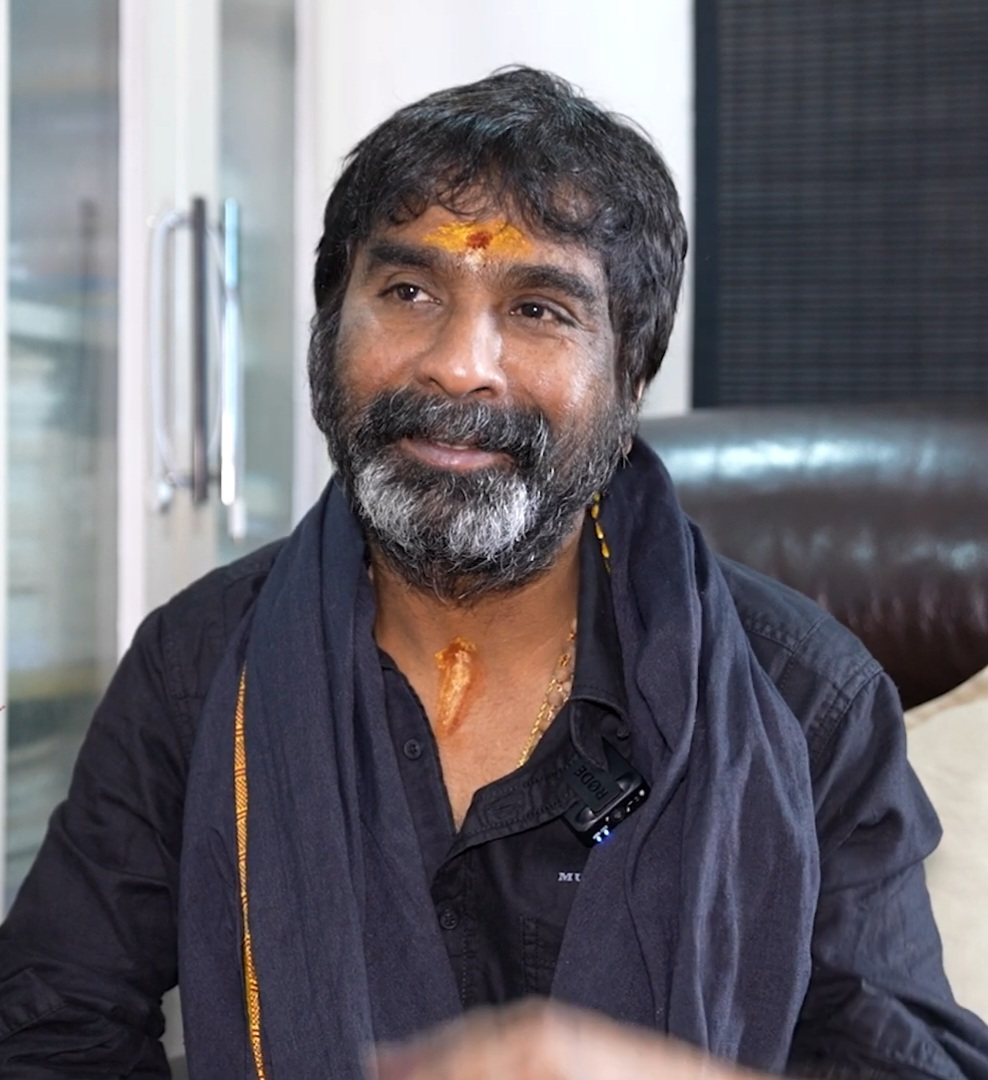
- Born: Bhaskarabhatla Ravi Kumar; 5 June 1974 (age 52); Srikakulam, Andhra Pradesh, India
- Education: B.A in Telugu
- Occupation: Lyricist
- Spouse: Lalita

Bhaskarabhatla Ravi Kumar is an Indian lyricist and a former film journalist who predominantly works in Telugu cinema. He worked for more than 125 films and penned lyrics for around 1000 songs as of 2025. He extensively worked with director Puri Jagannadh and music director Chakri and S. S. Thaman. He is famous for songs appealing to the masses. His primary genres are mass, romantic, and melodies. He won two Santosham Film Awards in 2006 and 2008 and a SIIMA award in 2013.

== Personal life ==
Bhaskarabhatla was born on 5 June 1974 in Srikakulam and brought up in Rajahmundry among five siblings. In his childhood he got interested in literature from his maternal grand father Aravelli Rajagopalacharya. While in Rajahmundry he used to frequent Gouthami Library and it influenced him to venture into poetry. Since his childhood he used to get inspired from the film posters. He completed B.A in Telugu and worked as a film journalist in Eenadu, Hyderabad for 10 years. Later he left his job to pursue a career in film industry.

He married Lalitha who is a B.Sc graduate from Warangal on 13 August 1998. The couple has two daughters Amanta, Samhita.

== Career ==
He started his career as a lyricist in 2000 with the film Goppinti Alludu directed by E. V. V. Satyanarayana starring Nandamuri Balakrishna. He was encouraged to be a lyricist by actor Tanikella Bharani and composer Chakri. He got break with the 2001 film Itlu Sravani Subramanyam directed by Puri Jagannadh which was a musical hit. He worked with Puri Jagannadh for 15 films and worked with composer Chakri for 65 films. Bhaskarabhatla has worked has written lyrics for more than 25 films for hero Ravi Teja.

Chakri and Bhaskarabhatla both started their careers together. He also worked with popular directors like E. V. V. Satyanarayana, Trivikram Srinivas, Harish Shankar etc.

He stated that he is an fan of poet Sri Sri who has inspired him to write poetry. He frequently reads Sri sri's Maha Prasthaanam citing it as his Bhagavadgeetha. Along with Sri Sri, Sirivennela Seetharama Sastry also has a major influence on him.

After "Ippatikinka Naa Vayasu" from Pokiri becoming a hit, Bhaskarabhatla got so many offers to write item songs. Fearing of being typecasted only for item songs, he started rejecting those offers and established himself as someone who can write all kinds of songs.

== Partial filmography ==
Year	Title	Music composer	Song name	Notes
2001	Itlu Sravani Subramanyam	Chakri	"Malli Kuyave Guvva"	
2005	Sankranti	S. A. Rajkumar	"Chilakaa"	
2006	Pokiri	Mani Sharma	"Ippatikinka Naa Vayasu"	
2006	Bommarillu	Devi Sri Prasad	"Bommani Geesthe", "Kaani Ippudu"	
2008	Jalsa	Devi Sri Prasad	"Gallo Thelinattunde"	
2008	Neninthe	Chakri	"Krishna Nagarey"	
2008	Kuberulu	Jeevan Thomas	All songs	
2009	Bumper Offer	Raghu Kunche	All songs	
2012	Businessman	S. Thaman	All songs	
2012	Adhinayakudu	Kalyani Malik	All songs except "Mast Jawani"	
2013	Balupu	S. Thaman	"Kajal Chelliva", "Lucky Lucky", "Pathikella Chinnadi", "Hello Boys and Girls"	
2014	Rough	Mani Sharma	All songs	
2014	Power	S. Thaman	"Notanki Notanki", "Devudaa Devudaa"	
2015	Shivam	Devi Sri Prasad	All songs	
2015	Pandaga Chesko	S. Thaman	All songs	
2017	Guru	Santhosh Narayanan	"Jingidi", "Ey Pataakey"	
2020	Aakaasam Nee Haddhu Ra	G. V. Prakash Kumar	"Katuka Kanule"	Dubbed version
2021	Bro	Shekar Chandra	"Annayya", "Chellemma", "Oohalo", "Anandham", "O My Dear Brother"	
2021	Nootokka Jillala Andagadu	Shakthikanth Karthick	"Nootokka Jillala Andagadu", "Naa Girlfriendu", "Manasa Vinava"	
2021	Romantic	Sunil Kashyap	All songs	
2022	Nenu Meeku Baaga Kavalsinavaadini	Mani Sharma	All songs except "Attanti Ittanti"	
2022	Liger	Vikram Montrose, Tanishk Bagchi	All songs	
2024	Aa Okkati Adakku	Gopi Sundar	All songs	
2025	Sankranthiki Vasthunam	Bheems Ceciroleo	"Godari Gattu"	
2025	Kuberaa	Devi Sri Prasad	"Poyiraa Mama"	
2025	Andhra King Taluka	Vivek-Mervin	"Puppy Shame"	
2025	Dilruba	Sam C. S.	"Aggipulle", "Hey Jingili"	
2025	Krishna Leela	Bheems Ceciroleo	All songs	
2026	Mana Shankara Vara Prasad Garu	Bheems Ceciroleo	"Meesaala Pilla"	
2026	Ustaad Bhagat Singh	Devi Sri Prasad	"Dekhlenge Saala"	
2026	Youth	G. V. Prakash Kumar	"Chamiki"	
2026	Dacoit: A Love Story	Bheems Ceciroleo	"Rubaroo"	

== Awards ==
In 2006 he won Santosham film awards for his song in Bommarillu. In 2008 he won Santosham film award for the film Neninthe. In 2013 he won SIIMA Award for Best Lyricist (Telugu) for the song ''Sir Osthara'' in Businessman.
