= List of accolades received by Rangasthalam =

- Ram Charan won several awards for his role as Chitti Babu
Accolades
Award	Won	Nominated
Filmfare Awards South	5	11
National Film Awards	1	1
Radio City Cine Awards	5	15
Santosham Film Awards	3	3
South Indian International Movie Awards	9	14
TSR -TV9 National Film Awards	3	3
Zee Cine Awards Telugu	10	10
- Total number of awards and nominations (Note: Awards in certain categories do not have prior nominations and only winners are announced by the jury. For simplification and to avoid errors, each award in this list has been presumed to have had a prior nomination.)
Totals	37	57
- References

Rangasthalam is a 2018 Indian Telugu-language period action-drama film written and directed by Sukumar. Produced by Y. Naveen, Y. Ravi Shankar and C. V. Mohan for the company Mythri Movie Makers, the film stars Ram Charan and Samantha Akkineni with Aadhi Pinisetty, Jagapathi Babu, Prakash Raj, Naresh, and Anasuya Bharadwaj in key supporting roles.

Made on a budget of ₹600 million, and was released globally on 30 March 2018. Rangasthalam received positive reviews from the critics who were particularly appreciative of Sukumar's writing and the performances of the ensemble cast; they were critical of the film's slow pace and runtime nearing three hours. The film was commercially successful, grossing a total of ₹2.16 billion (equivalent to ₹2.9 billion or US$30 million in 2023) and is among the highest-grossing Telugu films.

At the 66th National Film Awards, the film won National Film Award for Best Audiography. It won ten awards at Zee Cine Awards Telugu. The film won many awards at 66th Filmfare Awards South and 8th South Indian International Movie Awards.

== Accolades ==
Award	Date of ceremony (Note: Date is linked to the article about the awards held that year, wherever possible.)	Category	Recipient(s)	Result	Ref.
Filmfare Awards South	21 December 2019	Best Film – Telugu	Rangasthalam	Nominated	
Filmfare Awards South	21 December 2019	Best Director – Telugu	Sukumar	Nominated	
Filmfare Awards South	21 December 2019	Best Actor – Telugu	Ram Charan	Won	
Filmfare Awards South	21 December 2019	Best Actress – Telugu	Samantha Akkineni	Nominated	
Filmfare Awards South	21 December 2019	Best Supporting Actor – Telugu	Aadhi Pinisetty	Nominated	
Filmfare Awards South	21 December 2019	Best Supporting Actress – Telugu	Anasuya Bharadwaj	Won	
Filmfare Awards South	21 December 2019	Best Music Director – Telugu	Devi Sri Prasad	Won	
Filmfare Awards South	21 December 2019	Best Lyricist – Telugu	Chandrabose	Won	
Filmfare Awards South	21 December 2019	Best Male Playback Singer – Telugu	Rahul Sipligunj for "Ranga Ranga Rangasthalana"	Nominated	
Filmfare Awards South	21 December 2019	Best Female Playback Singer – Telugu	M. M. Manasi for "Rangamma Mangamma"	Nominated	
Filmfare Awards South	21 December 2019	Best Cinematography – South	R. Rathnavelu	Won	
National Film Awards	9 August 2019	Best Audiography	M. R. Rajakrishnan	Won	
Radio City Cine Awards Telugu	1 March 2019	Best Film	Rangasthalam	Won	
Radio City Cine Awards Telugu	1 March 2019	Best Story	Rangasthalam	Nominated	
Radio City Cine Awards Telugu	1 March 2019	Best Dialogue	Rangasthalam	Nominated	
Radio City Cine Awards Telugu	1 March 2019	Family Entertainer of the Year	Rangasthalam	Nominated	
Radio City Cine Awards Telugu	1 March 2019	Best Director	Sukumar	Won	
Radio City Cine Awards Telugu	1 March 2019	Best Hero	Ram Charan	Won	
Radio City Cine Awards Telugu	1 March 2019	Best Heroine	Samantha Akkineni	Nominated	
Radio City Cine Awards Telugu	1 March 2019	Best Villain	Prakash Raj	Nominated	
Radio City Cine Awards Telugu	1 March 2019	Best Supporting Actor – Male	Aadhi Pinisetty	Won	
Radio City Cine Awards Telugu	1 March 2019	Best Supporting Actor – Female	Anasuya Bharadwaj	Won	
Radio City Cine Awards Telugu	1 March 2019	Best Music Director	Devi Sri Prasad	Nominated	
Radio City Cine Awards Telugu	1 March 2019	Best Male Playback Singer	Devi Sri Prasad for "Yentha Sakkagunnave"	Nominated	
Radio City Cine Awards Telugu	1 March 2019	Best Playback Singer – Female	M. M. Manasi for "Rangamma Mangamma"	Nominated	
Radio City Cine Awards Telugu	1 March 2019	Best Song	''Rangamma Mangamma''	Nominated	
Radio City Cine Awards Telugu	1 March 2019	Best Lyricist	Chandrabose for "Jigelu Rani"	Nominated	
Radio City Cine Awards Telugu	1 March 2019	Best Choreography	Jani Master for "Jigelu Rani"	Nominated	
Santosham Film Awards	29 September 2019	Best Director	Sukumar	Won	
Santosham Film Awards	29 September 2019	Best Cinematographer	R. Rathnavelu	Won	
Santosham Film Awards	29 September 2019	Best Choreographer	Prem Rakshith	Won	
Santosham Film Awards	29 September 2019	Best Female Playback Singer	Ganta Venkata Lakshmi	Won	
South Indian International Movie Awards	15–16 August 2019	Best Film (Telugu)	Rangasthalam	Nominated	
South Indian International Movie Awards	15–16 August 2019	Best Director (Telugu)	Sukumar	Won	
South Indian International Movie Awards	15–16 August 2019	Best Actor (Telugu)	Ram Charan	Won	
South Indian International Movie Awards	15–16 August 2019	Best Actress (Telugu)	Samantha Akkineni	Nominated	
South Indian International Movie Awards	15–16 August 2019	Best Supporting Actor (Telugu)	Aadhi Pinisetty	Nominated	
South Indian International Movie Awards	15–16 August 2019	Best Supporting Actress (Telugu)	Anasuya Bharadwaj	Won	
South Indian International Movie Awards	15–16 August 2019	Best Villain	Jagapathi Babu	Nominated	
South Indian International Movie Awards	15–16 August 2019	Best Music Director (Telugu)	Devi Sri Prasad	Won	
South Indian International Movie Awards	15–16 August 2019	Best Lyricist (Telugu)	Chandrabose for "Yentha Sakkagunnave"	Won	
South Indian International Movie Awards	15–16 August 2019	Best Male Playback Singer (Telugu)	Rahul Sipligunj for "Ranga Ranga"	Nominated	
South Indian International Movie Awards	15–16 August 2019	Best Female Playback Singer (Telugu)	M. M. Manasi for "Rangamma Mangamma"	Won	
South Indian International Movie Awards	15–16 August 2019	Best Cinematographer (Telugu)	R. Rathnavelu	Won	
South Indian International Movie Awards	15–16 August 2019	Best Actress Critics	Samantha Akkineni	Won	
TSR – TV9 National Film Awards	17 February 2019	Most Popular Film	Rangasthalam	Won	
TSR – TV9 National Film Awards	17 February 2019	Most Popular Director	Sukumar	Won	
TSR – TV9 National Film Awards	17 February 2019	Best Hero	Ram Charan	Won	
Zee Cine Awards Telugu	6 January 2019	Best Actor in a Leading Role – Male	Ram Charan	Won	
Zee Cine Awards Telugu	6 January 2019	Best Actor in Supporting Role – Female	Anasuya Bharadwaj	Won	
Zee Cine Awards Telugu	6 January 2019	Best Music Director	Devi Sri Prasad	Won	
Zee Cine Awards Telugu	6 January 2019	Best Lyricist	Chandrabose for "Jigelu Rani"	Won	
Zee Cine Awards Telugu	6 January 2019	Best Playback Singer – Female	M. M. Manasi for "Rangamma Mangamma"	Won	
Zee Cine Awards Telugu	6 January 2019	Best Cinematography	R. Rathnavelu	Won	
Zee Cine Awards Telugu	6 January 2019	Best Choreography	Prem Rakshith	Won	
Zee Cine Awards Telugu	6 January 2019	Best Art Director	Sabbani Rama Krishna; Monika Nigotre	Won	
Zee Cine Awards Telugu	6 January 2019	Best Editor	Naveen Nooli	Won	
Zee Cine Awards Telugu	6 January 2019	Favorite Movie of the Year	Mythri Movie Makers – Rangasthalam	Won	

== See also ==
- List of Tollywood films of 2018
- Rangasthalam (soundtrack)
