= List of Telugu films of 2018 =

This is a list of Telugu films released in the year 2018.

== Box office ==
The top films released in 2018 by worldwide Box Office gross revenue in Indian rupees are as follows:

Highest-grossing films of 2018
Rank	Title	Production company	Worldwide gross	Ref.
1	Bharat Ane Nenu	DVV Entertainments	₹225 crore (US$23 million)	
2	Rangasthalam	Mythri Movie Makers	₹216 crore (US$22 million)	
3	Aravinda Sametha Veera Raghava	Haarika & Hassini Creations	₹190 crore (US$20 million)	
4	Geetha Govindam	GA2 Pictures	₹132 crore (US$14 million)	
5	Naa Peru Surya	Ramalakshmi Cine Creations	₹101.16 crore (US$11 million)	
6	Agnyaathavaasi	Harika & Hassine Creations	₹95 crore (US$9.9 million)	
7	Mahanati	Vyjayanthi Movies	₹83 crore (US$8.6 million)	
8	Bhaagamathie	UV Creations	₹67 crore (US$7.0 million)	
9	Jai Simha	CK Entertainments	₹50 crore (US$5.2 million)	
10	Devadas	Vyjayanthi Movies	₹48.2 crore (US$5.0 million)	

== January – June ==
Opening		Title	Director	Cast	Production house	Ref
J A N	6	Chilkur Balaji	Allani Sridhar	Sunil Sharma, Saikumar, S. P. Balasubrahmanyam, Aamani, Bhanu Sri Mehra, Suman	Filmedia Productions	
J A N	10	Agnyaathavaasi	Trivikram Srinivas	Pawan Kalyan, Keerthy Suresh, Anu Emmanuel, Aadhi Pinisetty, Boman Irani	Haarika & Hassine Creations	
J A N	12	Jai Simha	K. S. Ravikumar	Nandamuri Balakrishna, Nayantara, Haripriya, Natasha Doshi, Prakash Raj, Ashutosh Rana	C. K. Entertainment	
J A N	14	Rangula Ratnam	Sri Rajani	Raj Tarun, Chitra Shukla, Priyadarshi Pullikonda, Sithara	Annapurna Studios	
J A N	19	3 Mukhi	Aishwarya Addala	Aishwarya Addala, Satyanand, Gopi Chand, Yadha Kumar	Ram Creations	
J A N	19	Ego	R. V. Subramanyam	Aashish Raj Bidkikar, Simran Sharma, Diksha Panth	VKA Films	
J A N	26	Bhaagamathie	G. Ashok	Anushka Shetty, Jayaram, Unni Mukundan, Asha Sarath, Murali Sharma	UV Creations; Studio Green	
F E B	2	Chalo	Venky Kudumula	Naga Shaurya, Rashmika Mandanna, Naresh, Achyuth Kumar, Raghu Babu	Ira Creations	
F E B	2	HBD - Hacked By Devil	Krishna Karthik	Santoshi Sharma, Meghana, Himaja	Login Media	
F E B	2	Touch Chesi Chudu	Vikram Sirikonda	Ravi Teja, Raashi Khanna, Seerat Kapoor, Freddy Daruwala	Lakshmi Narasimha Productions	
F E B	3	Howrah Bridge	Revan Yadhu	Rahul Ravindran, Chandini Chowdhary, Manali Rathod, Rao Ramesh, Ajay, Ali	EMVE Studios	
F E B	9	Gayatri	R. R. Madan	Mohan Babu, Shriya Saran, Vishnu Manchu, Brahmanandam	Sree Lakshmi Prasanna Pictures	
F E B	9	Inttelligent	V. V. Vinayak	Sai Dharam Tej, Lavanya Tripathi, Rahul Dev, Ashish Vidyarthi, Sayaji Shinde, Nassar, Dev Gill, Jaya Prakash Reddy, Brahmanandam	CK Entertainments	
F E B	10	Tholi Prema	Venky Atluri	Varun Tej, Raashi Khanna	Sri Venkateswara Cine Chitra	
F E B	14	Idi Naa Love Story	M. Ramesh Gopi	Tarun Kumar, Oviya, Manchu Manoj	Ram Entertainments	
F E B	16	Awe	Prashanth Varma	Kajal Aggarwal, Nithya Menen, Regina Cassandra, Eesha Rebba, Srinivas Avasarala, Murali Sharma	Wall Poster Cinema	
F E B	16	Manasuku Nachindi	Manjula Ghattamaneni	Sundeep Kishan, Amyra Dastur, Tridha Choudhury, Adith Arun, Priyadarshi Pullikonda	Anandi Arts and Indira Productions	
F E B	16	Rachayitha	Vidya Sagar Raju	Vidya Sagar Raju, Sanchita Padukone, Ragini, Supriya	Duhara Movies	
F E B	16	Soda Golisoda	Hari Babu	Maanas, Nitya Naresh, Brahmanandam, Ali, Shakalaka Shankar, Krishna Bhagawan	SB Art Creations	
F E B	23	Chalte Chalte	Pradeep K. K.	Vishwadev Rachakonda, Priyanka Jain, Rajashree Nayar, Shayaji Shinde, Rao Ramesh	Amazing Arts	
F E B	23	Hyderabad Love Story	Raj Satya	Rahul Ravindran, Reshmi Menon, Jiya	SNR Films India Pvt LTD	
F E B	23	Juvva	Trikoti Peta	Ranjith Somi, Palak Lalwani, Posani Krishna Murali, Ali	Sommi Films	
F E B	23	Raa Raa	L. Ramakrishna Raju	Meka Srikanth, Naziya, Posani Krishna Murali, Raghu Karumanchi, Shakalaka Shankar	Vijicherrish Visions	
M A R	9	Ye Mantram Vesave	Sridhar Marri	Vijay Deverakonda, Shivani Singh	Golisoda Films	
M A R	16	Aithe 2.0	Raj Madiraju	Indraneil Sengupta, Zara Shah, Kartavya Sharma, Abhishek Gupta	Firm 9 Pictures	
M A R	16	Kirrak Party	Sharan Koppisetty	Nikhil Siddharth, Simran Pareenja, Samyuktha Hegde, Rakendu Mouli	AK Entertainments	
M A R	16	Nelluri Pedda Reddy	V. J. Reddy	Satish Reddy, Mouryani, Ambati Srinivas	Manisha Arts & Media Pvt Ltd	
M A R	16	Vadena	Sai Suneel Nimmala	Shiv Tandel, Neha Deshpande, Ajay Ghosh	Nirmani Films	
M A R	17	Manasainodu	Satyavarapu Venkateswararao	Manoj Nandam, Priya Singh, Posani Krishna Murali, Raghu Babu	H Pictures	
M A R	23	Anaganaga Oka Vullo	Sai Krishna K. V.	Ashok Kumar, Priyanka Sharma, Suman, Krishnudu	Chandra Balaji Films	
M A R	23	MLA	Upendra Madhav	Nandamuri Kalyan Ram, Kajal Aggarwal, Ravi Kishan, Brahmanandam	Blue Planet Entertainments	
M A R	23	Needi Naadi Oke Katha	Udugula Venu	Sree Vishnu, Satna Titus, Nara Rohit, Posani Krishna Murali	Aran Media Works	
M A R	30	Rangasthalam	Sukumar	Ram Charan, Samantha Akkineni, Aadhi Pinisetty, Jagapathi Babu, Prakash Raj	Mythri Movie Makers	
A P R	5	Chal Mohan Ranga	Krishna Chaitanya	Nithiin, Megha Akash, Madhunandan, Rao Ramesh, Sanjay Swaroop	Sresht Movies; Pawan Kalyan Creative Works	
A P R	6	Satya Gang	Prabhas Nimmala	Sathvik Eshwar, Prathyush, Akshita, Harshitha Singh, Suman, Suhasini Maniratnam	Sidda Yogi Creations	
A P R	12	Ameerpet 2 America	Challa Bhanu Kiran; Rammohan Komanduri	Tejas, Pallavi Dora, Vamsi Krishna, Vamshi Koduri, Meghana Lokesh, Sasha Singh, Mahita Beeram	Radha Media	
A P R	12	Krishnarjuna Yuddham	Merlapaka Gandhi	Nani, Anupama Parameswaran, Rukshar Mir, Brahmaji	Sri Venkateswara Creations	
A P R	13	Mercury	Karthik Subbaraj	Prabhu Deva, Sananth Reddy, Remya Nambeesan, Deepak Paramesh, Shashank Purushotham, Anish Padmanabhan, Indhuja	Stone Bench Films	
A P R	20	Bharat Ane Nenu	Koratala Siva	Mahesh Babu, Kiara Advani, Prakash Raj, R. Sarathkumar, Devaraj, P. Ravi Shankar, Yashpal Sharma	DVV Entertainments	
A P R	27	Achari America Yatra	G. Nageswara Reddy	Vishnu Manchu, Pragya Jaiswal, Brahmanandam, Pradeep Rawat, Thakur Anoop Singh, Kota Srinivasa Rao	Padmaja Pictures	
A P R	27	Kanam	A. L. Vijay	Sai Pallavi, Veronica Arora, Naga Shourya, Nizhalgal Ravi	Lyca Productions	
A P R	27	Endaro Mahanubhavulu	Thallada Sai Krishna	Thallada Sai Krishna, Anisha, Indu, Shalini, Tanikella Bharani	Sri Annapurna Creations	
A P R	27	Junction Lo Jayamalini	Narra Sivanageswara Rao	Ravikanth, Kavya Kapoor	Dikshitha Entertainments and Mahabharath Films	
M A Y	4	Naa Peru Surya	Vakkantham Vamsi	Allu Arjun, Arjun Sarja, Anu Emmanuel, R. Sarathkumar, Boman Irani, Thakur Anoop Singh, Sai Kumar, Pradeep Rawat, Harish Uthaman, Rao Ramesh, Nadhiya, Vennela Kishore	Ramalakshmi Cine Creations	
M A Y	9	Mahanati	Nag Ashwin	Keerthi Suresh, Dulquer Salman, Samantha Akkineni, Vijay Devarakonda, Rajendra Prasad	Swapna Cinema	
M A Y	11	Mehbooba	Puri Jagannadh	Akash Puri, Neha Shetty, Vishnu Reddy, Sayaji Shinde	Puri Jagannadh Touring Talkies	
M A Y	18	Annadata Sukhibhava	R. Narayana Murthy	R. Narayana Murthy	Sneha Chitra Pictures	
M A Y	18	Seenugadi Prema	R. K.	Srinivasa Rao, Bindu Barbie	Sushma Entertainment Media	
M A Y	25	Nela Ticket	Kalyan Krishna	Ravi Teja, Malvika Sharma, Jagapathi Babu, Sampath Raj, Priyadarshi Pullikonda, Ali	SRT Entertainment	
M A Y	25	Ammammagarillu	Sundar Surya	Naga Shourya, Shamili, Sumithra, Rao Ramesh, Posani Krishna Murali	Swaajit Movies	
J U N	1	Officer	Ram Gopal Varma	Nagarjuna Akkineni, Myra Sareen, Sayaji Shinde	R Company Production	
J U N	1	Raju Gadu	Sanjana Reddy	Raj Tarun, Amyra Dastur, Rajendra Prasad	AK Entertainments Pvt Ltd.	
J U N	8	Best Lovers	Nandi Venkat Reddy	Sri Karan, Amrutha, Divya	Srikaran Productions	
J U N	14	Naa... Nuvve	Jayendra Panchapakesan	Nandamuri Kalyan Ram, Tamannaah, Posani Krishna Murali, Tanikella Bharani, Surekha Vani	Cool Breeze Cinemas	
J U N	15	Sammohanam	Mohan Krishna Indraganti	Sudheer Babu, Aditi Rao Hydari	Sridevi Movies	
J U N	22	Jamba Lakidi Pamba	J. B. Murali Krishna	Srinivas Reddy, Siddhi Idnani, Posani Krishna Murali, Vennela Kishore, Raghu Babu	Shivam Celluloids	
J U N	29	Ee Nagariniki Emaindi	Tharun Bhascker Dhaassyam	Vishwak Sen, Sai Sushanth, Abhinav Gomatam, Venkatesh Kakumanu, Anisha Ambrose	Suresh Productions	
J U N	29	Sanjeevani	Ravi Vide	Anuraag Dev, Manoj Chandra, Swetaa Varma	Lakshmi Pictures	
J U N	29	Shambho Shankara	N. Sreedhar	Shakalaka Shankar, Karunya Chowdhary, Ajay Ghosh, Ravi Prakash	SK Pictures	
J U N	29	Super Sketch	Ravi Chavali	Narsing Makkala, Gary Tantony, Indrasena	Thriller	

== July–December ==
Opening		Title	Director	Cast	Production House	Ref
J U L	5	Pantham	K. Chakravarthy	Gopichand, Mehreen Pirzada, Sampath Raj, Mukesh Rishi, Pavitra Lokesh, Jaya Prakash Reddy, Ashish Vidyarthi, Sayaji Shinde	Sri Satya Sai Arts	
J U L	6	Aghora	Rao Durgam	Yuvaraj Rejeti, Nagendra Babu, Ponnambalam, Uttej, Jackee	Skml motion Pictures	
J U L	6	Divya Mani	Giridhar Gopal	Suresh Kamal, Vaishali Deepak	Moh Maya and Red Node Media	
J U L	6	Tej I Love You	A. Karunakaran	Sai Dharam Tej, Anupama Parameswaran, Surekha Vani, Jayaprakash, Pavitra Lokesh	Creative Commercials	
J U L	12	RX 100	Ajay Bhupathi	Karthikeya, Payal Rajput, Rao Ramesh, Ramki	Kartikeya Creative Works	
J U L	12	Vijetha	Rakesh Shashii	Kalyaan Dhev, Malavika Nair, Murali Sharma, Nassar	Vaaraahi Productions	
J U L	18	Aatagadharaa Siva	Chandra Siddhartha	Uday Shankar, Doddanna, Hyper Aadi, Chammak Chandra	Rockline entertainments pvt ltd	
J U L	20	Lover	Aneesh Krishna	Raj Tarun, Riddhi Kumar	Sri Venkateswara Creations	
J U L	20	W/O Ram	Vijay Yelakanti	Lakshmi Manchu, Samrat Reddy	People media factory	
J U L	27	Saakshyam	Sriwass	Bellamkonda Sreenivas, Pooja Hegde, Sarath Kumar, Meena, Jagapathi Babu, Ravi Kishan, Ashutosh Rana	Abhishek Pictures	
J U L	28	Happy Wedding	Lakshman Karya	Sumanth Ashwin, Niharika Konidela, Naresh, Murli Sharma	Pocket Cinema, UV Creations	
A U G	3	Brand Babu	Prabhakar Podakandla	Sumanth Shailendra, Eesha Rebba, Nalini, Murli Sharma	Shree Shailendra Productions	
A U G	3	Chi La Sow	Rahul Ravindran	Sushanth, Ruhani Sharma, Vennela Kishore, Anu Haasan, Vidyullekha Raman	Annapurna Studios, Siruni Cine Corporation	
A U G	3	Devi Vigraham	Raju Shetty		Shreenik Creations	
A U G	3	Goodachari	Sashi Kiran Tikka	Adivi Sesh, Sobhita Dhulipala, Prakash Raj, Jagapathi Babu, Madhu Shalini, Vennela Kishore	Abhishek Pictures	
A U G	3	Siva Kasipuram	Hareesh Vattikutti	Rajesh Sri Chakravarthy, Priyanka Sharma, Chammak Chandra	Sai Hareswara Productions	
A U G	3	Tharuvatha Evaru	G. Krishna Reddy; Rajesh Koduru	Manoj, Priyanka Sharma, Kamal Kamaraju	Happy Ending Creations	
A U G	9	Srinivasa Kalyanam	Satish Vegesna	Nithiin, Raashi Khanna, Nandita Swetha, Prakash Raj	Sri Venkateswara Creations	
A U G	15	Geetha Govindam	Parasuram	Vijay Devarakonda, Rashmika Mandanna, Nagendra Babu	GA2 Pictures	
A U G	24	Aatagallu	Paruchuri Murali	Nara Rohit, Jagapathi Babu, Darshana Banik, Brahmanandam	Friends Movie Creations	
A U G	24	Anthaku Minchi	Jhony	Jai, Rashmi Gautam	S Jai Films	
A U G	24	Neevevaro	Hari Nath	Aadhi Pinisetty, Taapsee Pannu, Ritika Singh, Vennela Kishore	MVV Cinema	
A U G	29	Super Sketch	Ravi Chavali	Narsingh Makkala, Gary Tantony, Indra Sena, Sameer Datta, Sophiya	You and I	
A U G	30	@Nartanasala	Srinivas Chakravarthy	Naga Shourya, Kashmira Pardeshi, Yamini Bhaskar, Jayaprakash Reddy, Ajay	Ira Creations	
A U G	31	Paper Boy	V. Jayashankar	Santhosh Shoban, Riya Suman, Tanya Hope	Sampath Nandi Creative Works	
A U G	31	Sameeram	Ravi Gundaboina	Yashwanth, Amrita Acharya, Getup Srinu, Jabardasth Ramu	Anitha Creative Works	
S E P	7	Anu Vamsi Katha	Ramesh Mukkera	Santhosh Raj, Neha Deshpande, Suman, Chammak Chandra	Koundinya Movies	
S E P	7	C/o Kancharapalem	Venkatesh Maha	Nithya Sree, Mohan Bhagath, Kesava. K, Radha Bessey, Vijaya Praveena Paruchuri, Subba Rao	Paruchuri Vijaya Praveena Arts	
S E P	7	Manu	Phanindra Narsetti	Raja Gautham, Chandini Chowdhary, Aberaam Varma, Mohan Bhagath	The Crowd	
S E P	7	Premaku Raincheck	Akella Peri Srinivas	Abhilash Vadada, Priya Vadlamani, Monica Tavanam	Stone Media Films	
S E P	7	Silly Fellows	Bhimaneni Srinivasa Rao	Allari Naresh, Sunil, Chitra Shukla, Nandini Rai, Poorna	People's Media Factory	
S E P	12	Enduko Emo	Koti Vaddineni	Nandu, Noel Sean, Punarnavi Bhupalam, Sudigali Sudheer	Maheshwara Creations	
S E P	13	Masakkali	Nabi Enugubala	Sai Ronak, Shravya, Kashi Vishwanath, Sirisha	Rose Telugu Movies	
S E P	13	Shailaja Reddy Alludu	Maruthi	Naga Chaitanya, Anu Emmanuel, Ramya Krishna, Murali Sharma, Vennela Kishore, Naresh	Sithara Entertainments	
S E P	13	U Turn	Pawan Kumar	Samantha Akkineni, Aadhi Pinisetty, Rahul Ravindran, Bhoomika Chawla	Srinivasaa Silver Screen, V.Y.Combines	
S E P	21	Ee Maaya Peremito	Ramu Koppula	Rahul Vijay, Kavya Thapar, Rajendra Prasad, Murali Sharma	VS Creative Works	
S E P	21	Antharvedham	ch ravi kishore babu	Tanikella Bharani, Amar, Santoshi, Posani Krishna Murali	Friends funding films	
S E P	21	Nannu Dochukunduvate	R. S. Naidu	Sudheer Babu, Nabha Natesh, Nassar, Thulasi Shivamani	Sudheer Babu Productions	
S E P	27	Devadas	Sriram Adittya	Nagarjuna, Nani, Rashmika Mandanna, Aakanksha Singh	Vyjayanthi Movies	
S E P	28	Natakam	Kalyanji Gogana	Ashish Gandhi, Ashima Narwal	Rizwan Entertainment	
O C T	4	Desamlo Dongalu Paddaru	Goutham Rajkumar	Khayyum Ali, Taniahq Rajan, Ali, Pruthviraj, Lohit Kumar	Sara Creations	
O C T	5	Bhale Manchi Chowka Beram	Murali Krishna Mudidani	Naveed, Mujtaba Ali Khan, Yamini Bhaskar, Kerintha Nookaraju	Aarolla Group	
O C T	5	NOTA	Anand Shankar	Vijay Devarakonda, Mehreen Pirzada, Yashika Anand, Sathyaraj, Nassar	Studio Green	
O C T	11	Aravinda Sametha Veera Raghava	Trivikram Srinivas	N. T. Rama Rao Jr., Pooja Hegde, Eesha Rebba, Jagapathi Babu, Sunil, Naveen Chandra, Supriya Pathak	Haarika & Hassine Creations	
O C T	12	Moodu Puvulu Aaru Kayalu	Ramaswamy	Arjun Yagith, Bharath Bandaru, Sowmya Venugopal, Pavani	Smile Pictures	
O C T	18	Hello Guru Prema Kosame	Trinadha Rao Nakkina	Ram Pothineni, Anupama Parameswaran, Pranitha Subhash, Prakash Raj	Sri Venkateswara Creations	
O C T	26	2 Friends	Srinivas GLB	Suraj Gowda, Sonia Dey Sarkar, Farah Titina, Akhil Karthik	Ananthalakshmi Creations	
O C T	26	Bangari Balaraju	Kotendra Dudyala	Raghav, Karronya Katrynn, Ajay Ghosh, Rohini, Lekhana	Nandi Creations	
O C T	26	Ratham	Chandrashekar Kanuri	Geetanand, Chandni Bhagwanani	Rajguru Films	
O C T	26	Veera Bhoga Vasantha Rayalu	R. Indrasena	Nara Rohith, Sudheer Babu, Shriya Saran, Sree Vishnu	Baba Creations	
N O V	2	Desa Dimmari	Nagesh Naradasi	Tanish Alladi, Sherin, Suman, Mukul Dev, Fish Venkat	Saveena Creations	
N O V	2	Kathanayakulu	Habeeb Shariff	Prayaga Bhasker, Raghavendra Rao Yadav		
N O V	2	Savyasachi	Chandoo Mondeti	Naga Chaitanya, R. Madhavan, Nidhhi Agerwal, Bhumika Chawla	Mythri Movie Makers	
N O V	7	Adhugo	Ravi Babu	Ravi Babu, Nabha Natesh, Abhishek Varma, Bunty	Suresh Productions	
N O V	8	Karma Kartha Kriya	Nagu Gawara	Vasant Sameer, Sahar Afsha, Nutan Raj, Ravi Varma, Jayaprakash, Harsha Uppaluri	Sri Tirumala Tirupathi Venkateshwara Films	
N O V	16	Amar Akbar Anthony	Srinu Vaitla	Ravi Teja, Ileana D'Cruz, Laya, Tarun Arora, Abhimanyu Singh, Vikramjeet Virk, Sunil, Vennela Kishore	Mythri Movie Makers, Eros International	
N O V	17	Taxiwaala	Rahul Sankrityayan	Vijay Devarakonda, Priyanka Jawlankar, Malavika Nair, Ravi Prakash	GA2 Pictures	
N O V	22	Sarabha	N. Narasimha Rao	Aakash Kumar, Mishti Chakraborty, Sayaji Shinde, Napolean, Nassar	AKS Entertainment	
N O V	23	24 Kisses	Ayodhya Kumar Krishnamsetty	Adith Arun, Hebah Patel, Naresh, Rao Ramesh	Silly Monks Entertainment	
N O V	23	LAW	Gagan Gopal Mulka	Kamal Kamaraju, Pooja Ramachandran, Mouryani, Manju Bhargavi	Sri Vigneshwara Films	
N O V	23	Rangu	Karthikeya	Tanish, Priya Singh, Posani Krishna Murali, Raghu Karumanchi	U & I Entertainments	
N O V	23	Rule	Paidi Ramesh	Shivamani, Sona Patel	Sri Sudarshana Chakra Creations	
N O V	23	Sainyam	J. P. Sravan Kumar	Vikranth Singh, Bhanu Prakash, Sanju Chowdhary	Gotte Productions	
N O V	29	Student Power	Guna Apparao	Venkat, Surya Kumari, Markandeya	Satya Krishna Creations	
D E C	1	Operation 2019	Karanam P. Babji	Srikanth, Diksha Panth, Yagna Shetty	Alivelamma Productions	
D E C	7	Kavacham	Srinivas Mamilla	Bellamkonda Sreenivas, Neil Nitin Mukesh, Kajal Aggarwal, Mehreen Pirzada, Harshvardhan Rane, Mukesh Rishi, Harish Uthaman, Posani Krishna Murali	Vamsadhara Creations	
D E C	7	Next Enti?	Kunal Kohli	Sundeep Kishan, Tamannaah, Navdeep, Poonam Kaur, Larissa Bonesi	Sri Venkateswara Creations	
D E C	7	Subhalekha + Lu	Sarrath Narwade	Sreenivasa Sayee, Deeksha Sharma Raina, Priya Vadlamani, Vamsi Raj, Mona Bedre, Appaji Ambarisha Darbha	Hanuma Telugu Movies	
D E C	7	Subrahmanyapuram	Santhosh Jagarlapudi	Sumanth, Eesha Rebba, Saikumar, Amit Sharma	Sudhakar Impex IPL	
D E C	14	Bhairava Geetha	Siddhartha	Dhananjay, Irra Mor	Rashi Combines	
D E C	14	Anaganaga O Premakatha	Pratap Thatamsetti	Ashwin J. Viraj, Riddhi Kumar	1000 Lights Media	
D E C	14	Husharu	Sree Harsha Konuganti	Tejus Kancherla, Tej Kurapati, Abhinav Chunchu, Dinesh Tej, Daksha Nagarkar, Priya Vadlamani, Ramya Pasupuleti, Hemal Ingle, Rahul Ramakrishna	Lucky Media	
D E C	21	Antariksham 9000 KMPH	Sankalp Reddy	Varun Tej, Lavanya Tripathi, Aditi Rao Hydari, Rahman, Satyadev, Srinivas Avasarala	First Frame Entertainments	
D E C	21	Padi Padi Leche Manasu	Hanu Raghavapudi	Sharwanand, Sai Pallavi, Priya Raman, Sampath Raj, Kalyani Natarajan, Murali Sharma, Sunil, Vennela Kishore, Priyadarshi Pullikonda	Sri Lakshmi Venkateswara Cinemas	
D E C	28	Bluff Master	Gopi Ganesh	Satyadev, Nandita Swetha, Aditya Menon, Brahmaji	Sridevi Movies, Abhishek Movies	
D E C	28	Idam Jagath	Anil Srikantam	Sumanth, Anju Kurian, Adhitya, Sivaji Raja	Viraat Films	
D E C	28	Ishtangaa	Sampath V. Rudra	Arjun Mahi, Tanishq Rajan, Duvvasi Mohan, Thagubothu Ramesh	AVR Movie Wonders	
D E C	28	Manchukurisevelalo	Bala Bodepudi	Ram Karthik, Pranali Ghoghare, Vijay Sai, Chammak Chandra	Pranathi Productions	
D E C	28	U – Kathe Hero	Kovera	Kovera, Himansee Katragadda, Swapna Rao, Subhalekha Sudhakar, Tanikella Bharani	Kovera Creations	
D E C	29	My Dear Marthandam	Harish K. V.	Prudhviraj, Rakendu Mouli, Kalyan Vitapu, Kalpika Ganesh, Krishna Bhagavan	Mazin Movie Makers	

== See also ==
- List of Telugu films of 2017
- Lists of Telugu-language films
- List of Telugu films of 2019
