= Rangasthalam (soundtrack) =

Soundtrack album by Devi Sri Prasad
- Released: 15 March 2018
- Recorded: 2017–2018
- Genre: Feature film soundtrack
- Length: 27:24
- Language: Telugu
- Label: Lahari Music; T-Series
- Producer: Devi Sri Prasad

Devi Sri Prasad chronology
Middle Class Abbayi (2017)	Rangasthalam (2018)	Bharat Ane Nenu (2018)

Rangasthalam is the soundtrack of the 2018 Indian Telugu-language film of the same name directed by Sukumar. Composed by Devi Sri Prasad, the soundtrack contains 6 songs with lyrics by Chandrabose. The film was produced by Naveen Yerneni, Ravi Shankar Yelamanchili and Mohan Cherukuri for Mythri Movie Makers. Ram Charan and Samantha played the lead roles, with Jagapati Babu, Aadhi Pinisetty, Prakash Raj, Naresh, Rohini and Anasuya Bharadwaj in supporting roles.

Lahari Music released the soundtrack on 15 March 2018 on YouTube. The soundtrack received positive reviews from the critics, who were appreciative of the lyrics and Prasad's instrumentation in tune with the film's periodic setting.

== Development ==
Devi Sri Prasad composed the film's soundtrack and score. The former consists of six songs, all written by Chandrabose. Chandrabose wrote the lyrics at Puducherry after holding discussions with Sukumar and Prasad. He completed writing five songs out of six in four days, with each one taking half an hour to complete. The tunes were composed after Chandrabose completed writing the lyrics.

To sound authentic, Prasad approached folk singers Shiva Nagulu, Rela Kumar and Ganta Venkata Lakshmi to provide vocals for the songs "Aa Gattununtava" and "Jigelu Rani". For the latter, he used a 70 year old clarinet as the song would reflect the mood of Rajahmundry of the 1980s. During the re-recording phase, the soundtrack version of "Aa Gattununtava" was discarded due to issues in lip syncing and the initial rough track (sung by Prasad) was used. Nagulu, however, received credit as the singer of the song in the soundtrack.

== Track listing ==
All lyrics are written by Chandrabose.

Rangsthalam (Telugu)
No.	Title	Singer(s)	Length
1.	"Yentha Sakkagunnave"	Devi Sri Prasad	04:23
2.	"Ranga Ranga Rangasthalana"	Rahul Sipligunj	05:04
3.	"Rangamma Mangamma"	M. M. Manasi	04:28
4.	"Aa Gattununtava"	Shiva Nagulu	03:09
5.	"Jigelu Rani"	Rela Kumar, Ganta Venkata Lakshmi	05:05
6.	"Orayyo"	Chandrabose	05:15
7.	"Aa Gattununtava (Unreleased/Theatrical Version)"	Devi Sri Prasad	03:09
Total length:			27:24

All lyrics are written by V. Nagendra Prasad.

Rangasthala (Kannada)
No.	Title	Singer(s)	Length
1.	"Entha Muddagidiye"	Sagar	04:22
2.	"Ranga Ranga"	Rahul Sipligunj	04:23
3.	"Rangamma Mangamma"	M. M. Manasi	04:28
4.	"Aa Partylirteeya"	R. P. Patnaik	03:09
5.	"Jil Jil Jilebi Rani"	Rela Kumar, Mohana Bhogaraju	05:05
6.	"O Ayya"	Chandrabose	05:15

All lyrics are written by Chandrabose.

Rangasthala (Tamil)
No.	Title	Length
1.	"Rangasthalam Title Track"	04:11
2.	"Istumo Istamaa"	04:05
3.	"Eenadu"	02:07
4.	"Orayyo"	04:47
5.	"Yentha Sakkagunave"	04:54
6.	"Jigena Rani"	04:41

== Release ==
The first single "Yentha Sakkagunnave", sung by Prasad himself, was released by Lahari Music on 13 February 2018. Two other tracks "Ranga Ranga Rangasthalana" and "Rangamma Mangamma" were released on 2 and 8 March 2018 respectively. Lahari Music released the soundtrack on 15 March 2018 in YouTube and all other digital platforms. The initial release contained only five tracks; the sixth one was excluded as it contained spoilers about the film's plot. The sixth track, titled "Orayyo", was a song used in the score for the scenes depicting Kumar Babu's funeral in the film. Sung by Chandrabose himself, "Orayyo" was released on 3 April 2018.

== Critical reception ==
Reviewing for Firstpost, Mridula Ramadugu termed Rangasthalam's soundtrack as Prasad's "most offbeat album yet" and added, "It would be biased to say — Not one track from this album goes unnoticed; but we are going to say exactly that. We took in this pure folk so well and enjoyed every bit of it." Scroll.in, in its review of the soundtrack, opined that Prasad's compositions "channel folk tunes that could have easily found a place on the stage" with "Yentha Sakkagunnave" mirroring Sukumar's effort "to bridge the gap between the stage and the screen", thus standing out from the rest. Priyanka Sundar of Hindustan Times called the soundtrack "rustic" and "highlights the backdrop of the film well", with the song "Yentha Sakkagunnave" being the soundtrack's highlight. In contrast, Suhas Yellapantula of The Times of India called the soundtrack "one-dimensional", criticising for its lack of variety despite being in sync with the film's theme.

== Awards and nominations ==
Award	Category	Recipient(s) and nominee(s)	Result	Ref.
Zee Cine Awards Telugu	Best Music Director	Devi Sri Prasad	Won	
Zee Cine Awards Telugu	Best Lyricist	Chandrabose for "Jigelu Rani"	Won	
Zee Cine Awards Telugu	Best Playback Singer – Female	M. M. Manasi for "Rangamma Mangamma"	Won	
Zee Cine Awards Telugu	Best Choreography	Prem Rakshith	Won	
Radio City Cine Awards Telugu	Best Music Director	Devi Sri Prasad	Nominated	
Radio City Cine Awards Telugu	Best Male Playback Singer	Devi Sri Prasad for "Yentha Sakkagunnave"	Nominated	
Radio City Cine Awards Telugu	Best Playback Singer – Female	M. M. Manasi for "Rangamma Mangamma"	Nominated	
Radio City Cine Awards Telugu	Best Song	''Rangamma Mangamma''	Nominated	
Radio City Cine Awards Telugu	Best Lyricist	Chandrabose for "Jigelu Rani"	Nominated	
Radio City Cine Awards Telugu	Best Choreography	Jani Master for "Jigelu Rani"	Nominated	
8th South Indian International Movie Awards	SIIMA Award for Best Music Director (Telugu)	Devi Sri Prasad	Won	
8th South Indian International Movie Awards	SIIMA Award for Best Male Playback Singer (Telugu)	Rahul Sipligunj for "Ranga Ranga Rangasthalana"	Nominated	
8th South Indian International Movie Awards	SIIMA Award for Best Female Playback Singer (Telugu)	M. M. Manasi for "Rangamma Mangamma"	Won	
8th South Indian International Movie Awards	SIIMA Award for Best Lyricist (Telugu)	Chandrabose	Won	
66th Filmfare Awards South	Best Music Director – Telugu	Devi Sri Prasad	Won	
66th Filmfare Awards South	Best Lyricist – Telugu	Chandrabose	Won	
66th Filmfare Awards South	Best Male Playback Singer – Telugu	Rahul Sipligunj for "Ranga Ranga Rangasthalana"	Nominated	
66th Filmfare Awards South	Best Female Playback Singer – Telugu	M. M. Manasi for "Rangamma Mangamma"	Nominated	
17th Santosham Film Awards	Best Choreographer	Prem Rakshith	Won	
17th Santosham Film Awards	Best Female Playback Singer	Ganta Venkata Lakshmi for "Jigelu Rani"	Won	
