= Paderu 12th Mile =

2025 Indian film

- Theatrical release poster
- Directed by: Nooka Sahibu
- Written by: Nooka Sahibu
- Produced by: Grandhi Trinadh
- Starring: Satyam Rajesh; Shravan; Prabhakar; Sameer; Suhana
- Cinematography: Girinaduni Amar
- Edited by: Shiva Sharvani
- Music by: Peddapalli Rohith
- Production company: Sai Lakshmi Ganapathi Creations
- Release date: 6 June 2025
- Country: India
- Language: Telugu

Paderu 12th Mile is a 2025 Indian Telugu-language mystery thriller film written and directed by Nooka Sahibu. The film stars Satyam Rajesh, Shravan, Prabhakar, Sameer, and Suhana in pivotal roles.

The film was released on 6 June 2025.

== Cast ==
- Satyam Rajesh as Kondayya
- Shravan
- Prabhakar
- Sameer
- Suhana
- Bal Bogati Roshan
- Gaddam Naveen
- Shaking Seshu
- Mukesh Gupta
- K.A. Paul Ramu
- Surya
- Chittibabu
- Murali

== Release and reception ==
Paderu 12th Mile was released on 6 June 2025.

The Hans India praised the lead cast performances and spiritual overtones. Sakshi Post too echoed the same while comparing it with Kodi Ramakrishna's fantasy directorials Ammoru (1995) and Arundhati (2009).
