= Ruler (film) =

2019 film by K. S. Ravikumar

- Theatrical release poster
- Directed by: K. S. Ravikumar
- Screenplay by: K. S. Ravikumar
- Story by: Paruchuri Murali
- Produced by: C. Kalyan
- Starring: Nandamuri Balakrishna; Vedhika; Sonal Chauhan; Bhumika Chawla
- Cinematography: C. Ramprasad
- Edited by: John Abraham
- Music by: Chirantan Bhatt
- Production companies: CK Entertainments; Happy Movies
- Release date: 20 December 2019 (India)
- Running time: 150 minutes
- Country: India
- Language: Telugu

Ruler is a 2019 Indian Telugu-language action drama film, produced by C. Kalyan under CK Entertainments and Happy Movies banners and directed by K. S. Ravikumar. The film stars Nandamuri Balakrishna, Vedhika, Sonal Chauhan, Bhumika Chawla. Chirantan Bhatt composed the film's music and C. Ramprasad handled the cinematography.

The film received negative reviews from critics and was a commercial failure.

== Cast ==
- Nandamuri Balakrishna as Arjun / Dharma
- Bhumika Chawla as Niranjana Prasad, Veerendranath Tagore's Daughter
- Shataf Figar as Bhavaninath Tagore
- Vedhika as Sandhya
- Prakash Raj as Veerandranath Tagore
- Sonal Chauhan as Harika
- Jayasudha as Sarojini Naidu
- Sayaji Shinde as Durga Prasad
- Nagineedu as Seetaramaiah
- Chalapathi Rao as Subba Rao
- Raghu Karumanchi as Arnold
- Dhanraj as Jackie Chan
- Srinivasa Reddy as Krishna Reddy
- Jhansi as Village member
- Raghu Babu
- Saptagiri
- Parag Tyagi as Bhavaninath's Henchmen
- Rajiv Kumar Aneja as Police Commissioner

== Production ==
The principal photography of the film started in July in Bangkok. The second schedule was completed in Ramoji Film City in October 2019. A melody song is picturized on Balakrishna and Vedhika in November at Munnar.

== Soundtrack ==
Ruler

Soundtrack album by Chirantan Bhatt
- Released: 2019
- Recorded: 2019
- Genre: Feature film soundtrack
- Length: 18:09
- Language: Telugu
- Label: Aditya Music
- Producer: Chirantan Bhatt

Chirantan Bhatt chronology
Kesari (film) (2019)	Ruler (2019)

Singles from Ruler
- 1. "Adugadugo Action Hero" Released: 1 December 2019; 2. "Padthadu Thaadu" Released: 11 December 2019

Music was composed by Chirantan Bhatt. Music released by Aditya Music Company.

No.	Title	Lyrics	Singer(s)	Length
1.	"Adugadugo Action Hero"	Ramajogayya Sastry	Saicharan Bhaskaruni	4:27
2.	"Padthadu Thaadu"	Bhaskarabhatla	Simha, Chandni Vijaykumar Shah	4:48
3.	"Sankranthi"	Ramajogayya Sastry	Swaraag Keerthan, Ramya Behara	4:35
4.	"Yaala Yaala"	Ramajogayya Sastry	Anurag Kulkarni, Anusha Mani	4:20
Total length:				18:09

== Release ==
The film released on 20 December 2019. The first look teaser on 21 November 2019 and trailer on 8 December 2019. The first single song Adugadugo Action Hero is released on 1 December 2019. Accordingly, the pre-release event held on 14 December 2019, at the MGM Grounds, VUDA Park, Visakhapatnam.

== Reception ==
Ruler received negative reviews from critics. Y. Sunita Chowdary of The Hindu stated that the film was purely for the fans. "Balakrishna fans will like him in any form and indeed made some effort to look different, gives Vedhika returns after a long time to perform in a better role. The hero gets elevated at each level and it becomes a tale of heroic exploits and nothing else," she added. The Times of India critic Suhas Yellapantula gave 1.5/5 stars and called it a "disappointing fare." He wrote: " A non-existent plot, poor characterization, and amateurish filmmaking ensures this film is a big miss. 123telugu.com also gave the same rating and wrote: "The concept is old school and unnecessary scenes, the second half could be avoided totally. The director, KS Ravikumar, has been stuck in a time warp and cannot move on from his outdated concepts. Although Balayya impresses with his posh look, the angry cop look is underwhelming with the horrible wig, which disappoints the general audience. A reviewer from The Hans India affirmed that the film doesn't have a proper storyline, "Director KS Ravikumar used the same commercial formula for this movie and even the story and screenplay are also not that gripping," they wrote.
