= Prabhakar (actor) =

Indian film actor

- Born: Husunabad, Andhra Pradesh, India (now in Telangana, India)
- Other name: Kalakeya Prabhakar
- Occupation: Actor
- Years active: 2007–present
- Spouse: Rajya Lakshmi
- Children: 2

Prabhakar, also known as Kalakeya Prabhakar, is an Indian actor who predominantly works in Telugu films along with Tamil and Kannada films. He is best known for his role as the king of the Kalakeyas in Baahubali: The Beginning (2015). His other notable films include Maryada Ramanna (2010), Dongaata (2015), Jai Simha (2018), Akhanda (2021). As of July 2022, he has acted in over 120 films in five languages.

== Early life ==
Prabhakar was born in Husnabad, near Raichur. His family hails from Kondangal of Mahabubnagar district, Telangana. After studying in Husnabad, he then shifted to Vikarabad to enroll in Ananta Padmanabha college.

His wife Rajya Lakshmi is a teacher, and his son Sriram Rajamouli was named after the famous director Rajamouli who offered him his first full-fledged role in Maryada Ramanna and gave him 'a new life'. He also has another son Ritvik Preetam.

== Career ==
Prabhakar played a minor role as villain in Mahesh Babu's Athidi, directed by Surender Reddy and supporting artist in his earlier career.

His first breakthrough film as an actor came in 2010 with Maryada Ramanna, directed by S. S. Rajamouli. He also acted in Gabbar Singh, directed by Harish Shankar, Dookudu, Aagadu, Lion and many more, which played well at the box office.

Prabhakar gain recognition following his appearance as a Kalakeya in Baahubali: The Beginning (2015), following which he came to be known as Kalakeya Prabhakar. In 2016, he appeared in Sarrainodu which became the third highest-grossing Telugu film that year. He also starred in Right Right, directed by Manu, starring Sumanth Ashwin and Pooja Zaveri where he played an important role. As of July 2022, he has acted in over 120 films in five languages.

== Partial filmography ==
Key
†	Denotes films that have not yet been released

=== Telugu films ===
Year	Title	Role	Notes
2007	Athidhi	Goon	
2008	Okka Magaadu		
2008	Parugu		
2008	Bujjigadu	Goon	Uncredited role
2008	Gajibiji	Prabhu	
2010	Maryada Ramanna	Baireddy	
2011	Seema Tapakai	S/O Venkatappa	
2011	Dookudu	Prakash Goud	
2011	Veera		
2012	Dammu	Chandravanshi King's henchmen	
2012	Lovely		
2012	Yamaho Yama		
2012	Nippu		
2012	Sarocharu		
2012	Gabbar Singh	Banda Swamy	
2013	Jai Sreeram		
2013	Shatruvu		
2013	Mahankali	Naayak	
2013	Romance		
2013	Doosukeltha	Badhram	
2013	Attarintiki Daredi	Siddhappa Naidu's henchman	
2014	Legend		
2014	Aagadu	Damodhar's Bihar batch	
2014	Loukyam	Shankar	
2014	Rabhasa	Ganeshan	
2015	Lion	Forest Tribes	
2015	Lava Kusa		
2015	Dongaata	Kattam Raju	
2015	Bengal Tiger	Banda	
2015	Baahubali: The Beginning	Kalakeya king Inkoshi	
2016	Sarrainodu	Vairam Dhanush's henchmen	
2016	Right Right	Seshu	
2017	Dwaraka	Ravi	
2017	Kittu Unnadu Jagratha		
2017	Lakshmi Bomb	Vaikuntam	
2017	Patel S. I. R.	Laala	
2017	Duvvada Jagannadham	Suri	
2017	Oxygen	Major Satyaveer	
2017	Om Namo Venkatesaya		
2018	Jai Simha	Kaniyappan	
2018	Pantham	Naayak's henchman	
2018	Devadas	Deva's henchman	
2019	90ML	Raja	
2020	Raahu	Nagaraju	
2021	Narappa	Gampanna	
2021	Akhanda	DSP Ranjan	
2022	Hero	Bhai's henchmen	
2023	Abhilasha		
2024	OMG: O Manchi Ghost		
2024	Aho Vikramaarka		
2024	Srikakulam Sherlock Holmes	Suspended police officer	
2025	Brahma Anandam		
2025	Paderu 12th Mile		
2025	Baahubali: The Epic	Kalakeya King Inkoshi	

=== Tamil films ===
Year	Title	Role
2014	Eppodhum Vendran	
2021	Kodiyil Oruvan	Conference Karuna
2021	Pon Manickavel	Peruvalathan
2022	Aadhaar	Vijayan
2022	DSP	Mutta Ravi
2023	Jambu Maharishi	
2023	Thalainagaram 2	Nanjunda
2025	Rajabheema	
2025	Padaiyaanda Maaveeraa	Inspector Ramkumar
2025	Kombuseevi	Konda Reddy
2026	Leader	Salt Raju

=== Kannada films ===
Year	Title	Role	Notes
2013	Brindavana		
2014	Gajakesari	Rana's henchman	
2016	Lakshmana		
2017	Chowka	Jungli	Cameo appearance
2018	Udgharsha		
2019	Natasaarvabhowma	Lawyer	
2020	Bicchugatti	Muddanna	

=== Malayalam films ===
Year	Title	Role
2018	Parole	Bullet Raghavan
2019	Kodathi Samaksham Balan Vakeel	Goonda
2022	Aaraattu	Durga Reddy
2025	I'm game	Balraj

=== Other language films ===
Year	Title	Role	Language
2015	Bal Ganesh 3	Vyomasur	Hindi
2019	Nayak	Kali Maharaj	Bhojpuri
2022	Sahari Bagha		Odia
