= Aho Vikramaarka =

2024 Indian Telugu-language film by Peta Trikoti

- Theatrical release poster
- Directed by: Peta Trikoti
- Screenplay by: Peta Trikoti
- Story by: Penmatsa Prasad Varma
- Produced by: Aarti Devinder Gill; Meehir Kulkarni; Ashwini Kumar Misra
- Starring: Dev Gill; Chitra Shukla; Pravin Tarde; Tejaswini Pandit
- Cinematography: Karm Chawla; Guru Prasad N.
- Edited by: Tammiraju
- Music by: Score; Ravi Basrur; Songs; Ravi Basrur; Arko Pravo Mukherjee
- Production company: Dev Gill Productions
- Release date: 30 August 2024
- Country: India
- Language: Telugu

Aho Vikramaarka is a 2024 Indian Telugu-language action drama film co-written and directed by Peta Trikoti. The film features Dev Gill, Chitra Shukla, Pravin Tarde and Tejaswini Pandit in lead roles.

The film was released on 30 August 2024.

== Plot ==
A ruthless cop uncovers a sinister mystery, forcing him into a brutal conflict against the villainous Asura to free enslaved victims

== Cast ==
- Dev Gill as inspector Vikramaarka Shankar Nagare
- Chitra Shukla as Archana
- Pravin Tarde as Asura
- Tejaswini Pandit as ACP Bhawani Shankar Nagare, Vikramaarka's mother
- Posani Krishna Murali
- Bithiri Sathi
- Sayaji Shinde as Sangameshwar, Vikramaaka's adopted father
- Prabhakar
- Vikram Sharma as Uggra
- Puja Banerjee as item dancer
- Ravi Prakash as inspector Shankar Nagare

== Music ==
The background score is composed by Ravi Basrur, whereas the soundtrack is composed by Ravi Basrur and Arko Pravo Mukherjee.

Track list
No.	Title	Lyrics	Music	Singer(s)	Length
1.	"Aho Vikramaarka - Title Track"	Kalyan Chakravarthy	Ravi Basrur	Prudhvi Chandra	1:56
2.	"Archana"	Purnachary	Ravi Basrur	Sri Krishna	3:42
3.	"Salma"	Krishna Kanth	Arko Pravo Mukherjee	Mohana Bhogaraju	3:13
4.	"Amma Song"	Chandrabose	Arko Pravo Mukherjee	Kaala Bhairava	3:29

== Release and reception ==
Aho Vikramaarka was released on 30 August 2024.

Avad Mohammad of OTTPlay rated the film 2 out of 5 and called it "an outdated action drama".
