= Manthrikan =

- Directed by: Anil
- Written by: Rajan Kiriyath
- Produced by: Anand Kumar
- Starring: Jayaram; Poonam Bajwa; Muktha George; Kalabhavan Shajohn; Ramesh Pisharody
- Cinematography: Vaidy S. Pillai
- Music by: S. Balakrishnan
- Release date: 5 October 2012 (India)
- Running time: 125 minutes
- Country: India
- Language: Malayalam

Manthrikan (transl. The Magician) is a 2012 Indian Malayalam-language comedy horror film directed by Anil, produced by Anand Kumar, and written by Rajan Kiriyath. The film stars Jayaram, Poonam Bajwa, and Muktha George in the lead roles. The music was composed by S. Balakrishnan. The film released on 5 October 2012, and it was panned by critics and audiences alike. The movie was dubbed in Hindi as Chandramukhi Ki Pratigya and in Tamil with the same name.

== Plot ==
Mukundan Unni is a tantric magician and exorcist. He is not really keen about his father's tantric magic skills and is whiling away his time with two dumb cronies in a remote village.

There he meets a girl named Malu, who has no memories about her past but falls pretty easily for the hero after a couple of songs. However, they get separated soon after.

Some years later, he is called by a wealthy family to exorcise a spirit called Rukkumani from their palatial house, Shenoy Mandir. There, he comes across Malu again under the name Chandana. He vows to get her back after she fails to recognise him.

Mukundan then remembers his father's teachings and starts learning from the ancient thaliyolas passed from generation to generation. He manages to bring Malu (Rukku) to the manthrakalam. Here he finds out about Rukku's past; a girl from a poor background who loved a person from the Shenoy Mandir. When the three brothers in the Shenoy Mandir got to know of the affair, they killed Rukku's family and burnt Rukku alive. Her lover, horrified at the sight, jumped into the flames and committed suicide. Since then, Rukku became a vengeful soul and killed two of the three brothers.

Mukundan was just about trap Rukku into a wooden doll when the Shenoy family came in, interrupting the pooja and freeing Rukku, who once more possesses Malu. One night Malu (Rukku) tries to kill the third brother. However, she is stopped by Mukundan and exorcised, freeing her from the world. Without asking for anything in return, Mukundan starts to leave. Just as he was about to leave, the third brother gives Malu to Mukundan.

== Cast ==
- Jayaram as Mukundan Unni alias Manthrikan
- Poonam Bajwa as Chandana/ Malu
- Muktha George as Rukkumani (Rukku)
- Kalabhavan Shajohn as Shekharan Kutty
- Ramesh Pisharody as Subrahmanyan
- Riyaz Khan as Giridhar (Giri)
- Suraj Venjaramoodu as Usthad Maambaram Maayankutty Sheikh / Payaruvila Pappan
- Devan as Shenoy
- Indrans as Unniyathiri
- Natasha Doshi as Dia
- Biyon
- Anil Murali
- Kottayam Nazeer
- Jayan
- Mahesh
- Dr. Sudhi Indran
- Nila Raj as Malu's friend
- Sukanya
- Swapna Menon

== Production ==
The film was directed by Anil, of the Anil-Babu screenwriter-director duo. The film was mainly shot from various parts of Kottayam district in Kerala. The film completed production which was in the production stage for quite a long time was completed in July 2012.

== Reception ==
The film was panned by critics. Rating the film, Aswin J. Kumar of The Times of India said, "In Manthrikan, there are two elements that persistently try to outsmart the other in terms of producing the desired effects. While the comic script of this film is horrifying for most part, the horror element does the opposite." He concluded the review which mostly criticised the script and direction saying, "An ineffective narrative that is uncertain about mixing horror and humour ruins Manthrikan." Veeyen of Nowrunning.com rated the film and said, "For the first time in my life, I fervently wished I had learned some magic. Magic, that could swiftly ship me away from the torturous times that this film was putting me through, late in the night as half the world lay peacefully asleep in their beds."

== See also ==
- List of Malayalam horror films
