= Jigelu Rani =

2018 song by Devi Sri Prasad, Chandrabose, Rela Kumar and Ganta Venkata Lakshmi

- Song cover featuring Pooja Hegde

Single by Devi Sri Prasad and Chandrabose featuring Rela Kumar and Ganta Venkata Lakshmi

from the album Rangasthalam
- Language: Telugu
- Released: 15 March 2018
- Recorded: 2017–2018
- Genre: Dance; pop; jazz; Dappankuthu; Electronic dance music; Item number
- Length: 5:05
- Label: Aditya Music
- Composer: Devi Sri Prasad
- Lyricist: Chandrabose
- Producer: Devi Sri Prasad

Rangasthalam track listing
- 1. "Yentha Sakkagunnave"; 2. "Ranga Ranga Rangasthalana"; 3. "Rangamma Mangamma"; 4. "Aa Gattununtava"; 5. "Jigelu Rani"; 6. "Orayyo"; 7. "Aa Gattununtava (Unreleased/Theatrical Version)"

Music video
- "Jigelu Rani" on YouTube

"Jigelu Rani" (transl. Dazzle queen) is an Indian Telugu-language song composed by Devi Sri Prasad, with lyrics by Chandrabose and recorded by Rela Kumar and Ganta Venkata Lakshmi for the soundtrack album of the 2018 film Rangasthalam. The song features Pooja Hegde as the lead, along with Ram Charan.

It was released on 15 March 2018 on YouTube as the fifth single from the album, through Lahari Music and T-Series. It was released on YouTube as a lyrical video song on 20 March 2018. After the frequent request of fans, the makers released the promo of music video on 27 March, coinciding Charan's birthday. The full video song, featuring scenes directly from the film, was released on 13 May 2018 on YouTube.

The song was also dubbed in Kannada as "Jil Jil Jilebi Rani", in Tamil as "Jigena Rani" and Malayalam as "Disco Rani" and was included in the respective dubbed versions of the film. The song received positive response upon its release. The hook step dance involving Pooja Hegde became popular. The track also topped the national charts, in all music and video platforms. Ganta Venkata Lakshmi won Santosham Film Awards for Best Female Playback Singer.

== Production ==
The song was composed by Devi Sri Prasad and was penned by Chandrabose. It was reported that the song was part of the narrative and was composed with the film's tune, and features Pooja Hegde in a rural avatar. Chandrabose wrote the lyrics in thirty minutes at Puducherry after holding discussions with Sukumar and Prasad. Prasad then composed the tunes after Chandrabose completing the lyrics. To sound authentic, Prasad roped in foll singers Rela Kumar and Ganta Venkata Lakshmi to sing the track. He said he used a 70 year old clarinet as the song reflected the mood of Rajahmundry of the 1980s. The composer Prasad likened the sound to the traditional beats of folk songs in Indian villages and used traditional drums for the track.

After seeing Venkata Lakshmi's "Burrakatha" on YouTube, director Sukumar and music director Devi Sri Prasad gave her an opportunity to sing this song in the film. Venkata Lakshmi, who had a small retail shop at Anakapalli, Visakhapatnam district went Prasad's studio in Chennai and stayed there two days to sing the song. She had doubts as to whether the song will be retained in the film. "But Devi Sri Prasad garu assured me that the song will be a huge hit for sure. I am proud to have sung the song", Venkata Lakshmi said.

The song was also dubbed in Kannada as "Jil Jil Jilebi Rani ", in Tamil as "Jigena Rani", and in Malayalam as "Disco Rani".

== Music video ==
=== Background and production ===
In late-September 2017, it was reported that Kareena Kapoor Khan or Priyanka Chopra would appear in an item number for the film. Later in early-October 2017, Pooja Hegde was reported to appear in this track. After seeing Hegde's performance, expressions and dance moves, Sukumar, the director of Rangasthalam decided to bring her for the special number. On 5 October 2017, Mythri Movie Makers confirmed the Hegde's inclusion. Though the makers tried to keep it secret to surprise the fans, the news was leaked.

This marks Hegde's first appearance in an item number and her maiden collaboration with Charan. The music video was choreographed by Jani Master. The song shooting was happened at a specially erected set in Hyderabad in early-February 2018, as part of the film's last schedule. The making video of the music video was released by the makers on 3 May 2018. The music video was released on 13 May 2018.

=== Synopsis ===
The music video is a direct clip from a scene in Rangasthalam, which features Jigelu Rani and Chitti Babu singing the lyrics. The song is about a girl from another coming to Rangasthalam village.

=== Reception ===
The song became one of the most viewed Telugu songs within 24 hours of its release on YouTube.

== Release ==
The audio of the song was released on 15 March 2018. It was released on YouTube as a lyrical video song on 20 March 2018, through Lahari Music and T-Series. After the success of its audio, the fans were highly anticipated for the music and video frequently asked makers to release video song.

The promo of music video was released on 27 March, coinciding with Ram Charan's birthday. The full video song, featuring visuals directly from the film, was released on 13 May 2018 on YouTube.

== Critical reception ==
Papri Paul of The Times of India praised the song and wrote "The high on energy song is massy and may sound raunchy at times, but has a unique appeal and distinct essence that will get everyone grooving. Pooja looks gorgeous as a village belle as she matches steps with Ram Charan. This is her first item number, however her dance moves and sultry expressions took her oomph factor a notch higher."

Mridula Ramadugu of Firstpost wrote "'Jigelu Rani' is the 'Diyalo Diyalo' of the album. 'Diyalo Diyalo' from 100% love for the same director was also one of the few songs were we got a taste of DSP's folk side and Jigelu takes over as one of those. This happens to the be the item number of the jukebox and makes you want to do a step or two. 'Jigelu Rani', by the sounds of it, has got all the village men at Jigelu Rani's doorstep breaking into Kuthu beats, as well, every once in a while. Rela Kumar and Ganta Venkata Lakshmi’s vocals on the track are local renditions at its best. You can’t miss their strong Rayalaseema slang throughout this entertaining composition."

Jeevi of Idlebrain.com noted "Pooja Hegde provides the much needed entertainment relief towards climax with her dance in Jigelu Rani song." A critic of Samayam wrote Ram Charan's and Pooja Hegde's dance moves are the highlight of the song.

== Impact ==
The song received positive reception from audiences, praising the music and lyrics, and became a huge success. The track became a chartbuster upon its release. The song started trending on internet instantly. The hook step performed by Pooja Hegde and Ram Charan, went viral on social media. Several DJ versions and remix versions were released by various artists. The beginning tune of this song was used in the track "Missed Cal Mini Mini" from the film Operation 2019. Actress Samantha Ruth Prabhu revealed that she done an item number in Pushpa: The Rise seeing the Hegde's dance in this song. "No doubt, glam divas have raised the bar on special songs in Telugu movies and it augurs well for big ticket extravaganzas. Also we are spending lavishly and promoting them on par with Bollywood numbers, so top-rung actresses are showing some interest," said producer Yalamanchili Ravi Shankar, after "Jigelu Rani"'s success.

The Times of India wrote "through alluring dance-moves in "Jigelu Rani" item number, Pooja has become a hot favourite among the masses in no time". A critic of Bollywood Hungama described it as "superhit" song from Rangasthalam. A critic of The Economic Times noted Hegde made a "memorable appearance". Priyanka Sundar of Hindustan Times stated that the success of "Jigelu Rani" increased the expectations for the film. Femina wrote Hegde's act in the song became the "talk of the town".

Sayanthana K from The Times of India listed the song in the "Tollywood's iconic item songs that turned into the ultimate party vibe". Radio Mirchi listed the song in "Top 6 sexy item songs". Choreographer Jani Master became more popular with this song. Several film and television actresses performed with the song in award ceremonies and other events. The song was also frequently played in Bigg Boss (Telugu TV series) season 4 for games and guest intros. After Maneesha singing this track with Anudeep Dev at Sa Re Ga Ma Pa 2018, judge Karthik revealed that he will definitely tell Devi Sri Prasad to see the performance.

== Chart performance ==
The song debuted on Mirchi Top 20 countdown on 16 March 2018. It stayed on the chart for 8 weeks. The song also topped in several charts. Samayam, listed the song in the Top 10 Super Hit Songs of 2018, as a year-ender special.

Chart performances for "Jigelu Rani"
Chart (2018)	Peak position
India (Mirchi Top 20)	10

== Live performances ==
Singers of the track, Rela Kumar and Ganta Venkata Lakshmi performed the song at the Sa Re Ga Ma Pa 2018 in June 2018. On 18 March 2018, Pooja Hegde performed the song with Jani at pre-release event for the film's promotion held at RK Beach, Vizag in Visakhapatnam. The cast and crew of the film danced to the song at film's success meet held on 13 April at Yousufguda Police Grounds in Hyderabad.

== Controversy ==
In July 2018, singer Ganta Venkata Lakshmi stated that she wasn't paid for singing the song and said she wasn't aware about her remuneration. Venkata Lakshmi revealed that she went to Chennai on her own expenses to record the song, but a mediator cheated her by not giving her remuneration. "I received lot of applause for this song but I was cheated because of the mediators. I didn't get my remuneration for the song. I also tried to attend the audio launch event of Rangasthalam, but I was not allowed", she added. Although she tried to approach the makers of the film and music director Prasad, meditators didn't give her a chance to meet them.

After Sukumar and Rangasthalam crew getting severe criticism and negative remarks from thousands of audiences for not paying the singer Venkata Lakshmi, Sukumar sent her a check of ₹ 1 lakh.

Despite the song's success, it also garnered criticism from viewers for filming song with drunken men in the film.

== Credits and personnel ==
- Devi Sri Prasad – composer
- Chandrabose – lyricist
- Rela Kumar – vocal
- Ganta Venkata Lakshmi – vocal
- Jani Master – choreographer
- Kalyan – rhythm
- Vikas Badisa – keyboard
- Uday Kumar – mix engineer, mastering engineer, programmer
- Kutty Uday – assistant sound engineer

== Accolades ==
Award (Note: Awards, festivals and organizations are in alphabetical order.)	Date of ceremony (Note: Date is linked to the article about the awards held that year, wherever possible.)	Category	Recipient(s)	Result
17th Santosham Film Awards	Best Female Playback Singer	Ganta Venkata Lakshmi	Won	
Radio City Cine Awards Telugu	Best Lyricist	Chandrabose	Nominated	
Radio City Cine Awards Telugu	Best Choreography	Jani Master	Nominated	
