= Kathanam =

2019 Telugu action thriller film

- Theatrical release poster
- Directed by: Rajesh Nadendla
- Written by: Rajendra Bharadwaj
- Screenplay by: Rajendra Bharadwaj
- Produced by: B. Narendra Reddy
- Starring: Anasuya Bharadwaj; Srinivas Avasarala; Vennela Kishore
- Cinematography: Sathish Muthyala
- Music by: Roshan Salur
- Production company: Gayathri Films
- Release date: 9 August 2019
- Running time: 117 minutes
- Country: India
- Language: Telugu

Kathanam (transl. Narrative) is a 2019 Indian Telugu-language action thriller film directed by Rajesh Nadendla while screenplay was penned by Rajendra Bharadwaj. The film stars Anasuya Bharadwaj, Vennela Kishore and Srinivas Avasarala in the lead roles. The film is produced under the production banner Gayathri Films. Music for the film was composed by Roshan Salur, and the cinematography was handled by Sathish Muthyala. The film was released on 9 August 2019 and opened to negative reviews from critics.

== Plot ==
Anu, an aspiring film director, is given the opportunity to improvise a script for a film. As she is writing the script, the characters in it die in real life. Anu approaches ACP Randhir to prevent further deaths.

== Cast ==
- Anasuya Bharadwaj as Anu and her mother, Aravinda
- Dhanraj as Dhana
- Randhir Gattla as ACP Randhir
- Vennela Kishore as CK alias Creative Kishore
- Srinivas Avasarala as Raghu, Aravinda's husband and Anu's father
- Babloo Prithiveeraj as Former Minister
- Sameer as DCP Prakash
- Sampoornesh Babu as himself in a cameo appearance

== Soundtrack ==
Kathanam

Soundtrack album by Roshan Salur
- Released: 9 August 2019
- Recorded: 2019
- Genre: Feature Film Soundtrack
- Label: Mango Music
- Producer: B Narendra Reddy

Track listing
No.	Title	Singer(s)	Length
1.	"O Amma"	Kaala Bhairava

== Marketing ==
The first look poster of the film was unveiled in October 2018 by the lead actress. The official trailer of the film was released on 3 August 2019.
