= Prabhakar =

Prabhakar is an Indian given name and surname. Prabhakars are Indian Brahmins mostly limited to North Indian states like Jammu and Kashmir, Punjab, Haryana and Rajasthan. They belong to sage Vatsa. People with the name include:

- Prabhakar (actor), Indian actor
- J. C. D. Prabhakar, the speaker of the 17th Tamil Nadu Assembly
- Arati Prabhakar, the former head of DARPA
- Chandan Prabhakar, Indian comedian
- Manoj Prabhakar, Indian cricketer
- Sundarwati Nawal Prabhakar (1922–2010), Indian National Congress politician
- Vishnu Prabhakar, Indian Hindi writer

It may also refer to:

- Prabhākara (c. 7th century), Indian philosopher grammarian in the Mimamsa tradition
- Janardhan Sharma, known as Prabhakar in Nepal
- Spider-Man (Pavitr Prabhakar), a fictional character appearing in American comic books by Marvel Comics
