= Maa Abbayi =

- Film poster
- Directed by: Kumar Vatti
- Produced by: Balaga Prakash Rao; Kumar Vatti
- Starring: Sree Vishnu; Chitra Shukla
- Cinematography: Thamashyam
- Music by: Suresh Bobbili
- Production company: Vennela Creations
- Release date: 17 March 2017
- Running time: 145 minutes
- Country: India
- Language: Telugu

Maa Abbayi (transl. My boy) is a 2017 Indian Telugu-language action thriller film starring Sree Vishnu and Chitra Shukla.

== Plot ==
Abbayi (Sree Vishnu) is a technical geek and an ethical hacker who leads a normal life and falls in love with his neighbour, Ammudu (Chitra Shukla), until one day his family dies in a bomb blast. Abbayi sets out to avenge the death of his family members. Later Ammudu also falls for him and her parents decide to get them married. Later he tracks down the criminals through his hacking skills and openly challenges their leader to kill him. The film ends with Abbayi revealing the terrorists' identities in Public and kills them in the same spot where his family has died.

== Cast ==
- Sree Vishnu as Abbayi
- Chitra Shukla as Ammudu
- Y. Kasi Viswanath as Abbayi's father
- Sana as Abbayi's mother
- Rajitha as Ammudu's mother
- Sivannarayana Naripeddi as Ammudu's father

== Production ==
The venture is helmed by debutante Kumar Vatti, who previously worked as an editor under Marthand K. Venkatesh. On the sets of Solo (2011), Kumar told Sree Vishnu that he would be the lead in his directorial debut. Chitra Shukla was signed to portray the heroine opposite Sree Vishnu. The film is based on a recent incident that occurred in Hyderabad. The film is produced by Balaga Prakash Rao and is scheduled to release on 17 March.

== Soundtrack ==
The music is composed by Suresh Bobbili. In a review of the soundtrack by The Times of India, the reviewer wrote that "With more than a couple of potential hits, this album is a winner".

No.	Title	Lyrics	Singer(s)	Length
1.	"Kadhiley Kadhiley"	Kandikoda	Suresh Bobbili	4:17
2.	"Aa Chandamama"	Kandikoda	Sweekar Agasthya	4:06
3.	"Guchi Guchi"	Karunakar Adigarla	Anjana Soumya, Anudeep	4:32
4.	"Hey Sairam"	Karunakar Adigarla	Saketh	4:32
5.	"Rangadeva"	Suresh Banisetti	Surendranath, Sahithi	4:40
6.	"Sarangi O Sarangi"	Suresh Banisetti	Simha, Sahithi Chaganti	3:50
Total length:				25:57

== Release ==
The Hindu gave the film a rating of one out of five stars and wrote that "The film fails in its attempt to be a slick thriller". Similarly, The Times of India gave the film a rating of one-and-a-half out of five stars and stated that "Save yourselves some time and money, by ignoring this one without a second thought".
