= Darja (film) =

2022 Indian drama film

- Directed by: Saleem Malik
- Written by: Saleem Malik
- Produced by: Siva Sankar Paidipati
- Starring: Sunil; Anasuya Bharadwaj
- Cinematography: Darshan
- Edited by: M R Varma
- Music by: Rap Rock Shakeel
- Production company: PSS Entertainments
- Release date: 22 July 2022
- Running time: 125 minutes
- Country: India
- Language: Telugu

Darja is a 2022 Indian Telugu-language drama film written and directed by Saleem Malik. The film was produced by Siva Sankar Paidipati under the banner of PSS Entertainments and features Sunil and Anasuya Bharadwaj in lead roles. The film was released theatrically on 22 July 2022 and also streamed on Aha on October 18, 2022. The film received mixed reviews from critics and was a commercial failure.

== Cast ==
- Sunil as ACP Paidipati Shiva Shankar
- Anasuya Bharadwaj as Kanaka Mahalakshmi
- Aqsa khan as Geetha
- Prudhvi Raj
- Aamani
- Shankar
- Naga Mahesh

== Production ==
The first look poster of the film was released on 24 October 2021 in the presence of Kamineni Srinivas. The principal photography of the film started in 2021 at Ramoji Film City, Hyderabad, and was primarily shot across Bhimavaram and Machilipatnam.

== Reception ==
Subbarao Nagabhiru of NTV gave the series 1.5/5 stars. Srivathsan Nadadhur of OTT Play rated the series 1/5 stars.

ABP Desam rated the series 1/5. The Times of India rated the series 2.75/5.
