= Inttelligent =

- Directed by: V. V. Vinayak
- Screenplay by: V. V. Vinayak
- Dialogues by: Siva Akula
- Story by: Siva Akula
- Produced by: C. Kalyan
- Starring: Sai Dharam Tej; Lavanya Tripathi
- Cinematography: S. V. Vishweshwar
- Edited by: Gautham Raju
- Music by: S. Thaman
- Production company: CK Entertainments
- Release date: 9 February 2018
- Country: India
- Language: Telugu

Inttelligent is a 2018 Indian Telugu-language action comedy film directed by V. V. Vinayak and produced by C. Kalyan under CK Entertainments. It features Sai Dharam Tej and Lavanya Tripathi, alongside Rahul Dev, Dev Gill, Nassar, Ashish Vidyarthi, Sayaji Shinde, Brahmanandam, Jaya Prakash Reddy, Vineet Kumar and Saptagiri. The music was composed by Thaman, while cinematography and editing were handled by S. V. Vishweshwar and Gautham Raju. The film is based on real-life incidents, which took place at Kukatpally in 2014.

Inttelligent was released on 9 February 2018 to negative reviews from critics and underperformed at the box office.

== Plot ==
Dharam Teja is a software engineer in Vision Soft Solutions with great amount of respect for its MD Nandha Kishore. Vicky Bhai, a notorious gangster, arrives in Hyderabad and tries to overtake the company. In this process, Nandha Kishore gets killed and Dharam kills Vicky's brother Dhina. Dharam takes on a new identity of Dharma Bhai to destroy Vicky's crime network. Dharam, being an ethical hacker, steals the politicians' black money and donates it to the underprivileged people, where he also kills Vicky, thus avenging Nanda Kishore's death.

== Cast ==
- Sai Dharam Tej as Dharma Teja/Dharma Bhai
- Rahul Dev as Vicky Bhai
- Nassar as Nandha Kishore
- Dev Gill as Dhina
- Ajaz Khan as Minister's son
- Vineet Kumar as Home Minister
- Lavanya Tripathi as Sandhya, Nandha Kishore's daughter
- Ashish Vidyarthi as Venkateshwar Rao I.P.S
- Sayaji Shinde as Commissioner Mohanty I.P.S
- Brahmanandam as Dharma Raju
- Jaya Prakash Reddy as Sathya Murthy I.P.S
- Duvvasi Mohan as Minister P.A
- Y. Kasi Viswanath as Dharma Teja's father
- Ravi Babu as Godavari Krishna
- Rahul Ramakrishna as Rahul, Dharma Teja's friend
- Saptagiri as Giri, Dharma Teja's friend
- Venu as Dharma Teja's friend
- Venky as Dharma Teja's friend
- Praveen as Hyderabadi men
- Chaitanya Krishna as Chaitanya "Chaitu", Godavari Krishna's son
- Vidyullekha Raman as Sathya Murthy's daughter
- Posani Krishna Murali as Yadav
- Raghu Babu as a politician
- Thagubothu Ramesh as a drunken guy
- Prudhvi Raj as M.L.A.
- Fish Venkat as Yadav's henchman
- Mahesh Achanta as M.L.A's Assistant
- Sudhakar Mishra as Businessman

== Soundtrack ==
Inttelligent

Soundtrack album by S. Thaman
- Released: Jan 28, 2018
- Recorded: 2018
- Genre: Soundtrack
- Length: 17:51
- Label: Aditya Music
- Producer: S. Thaman

S. Thaman chronology
Tholi Prema (2018)	Inttelligent (2018)	Chal Mohan Ranga (2018)

The music was composed by S. Thaman and released by Aditya Music.

Track-List
No.	Title	Lyrics	Singer(s)	Length
1.	"Let's Do"	Chandrabose	Saketh Komanduri, SriKrishna	4:40
2.	"Chamak Chamak Cham (Remix)"	Sirivennela Seetharama Sastry	S. P. B. Charan, Harini Ivaturi	4:44
3.	"Na Cell Phone"	Varikuppala Yadagiri	Manisha Eerabathini, Jaspreet Jasz	4:21
4.	"Kala Kala Kalamandir"	Bhaskarabhatla Ravi Kumar	Geetha Madhuri, Nakash Aziz	4:06
Total length:				17:51

== Box office ==
Inttelligent became a box-office bomb, collecting a share of ₹3.65 crore after being sold for ₹27 crore worldwide and recovered only 13.5% of its investment.
