= Natasha Doshi =

Indian actress and model

Natasha Doshi Shah
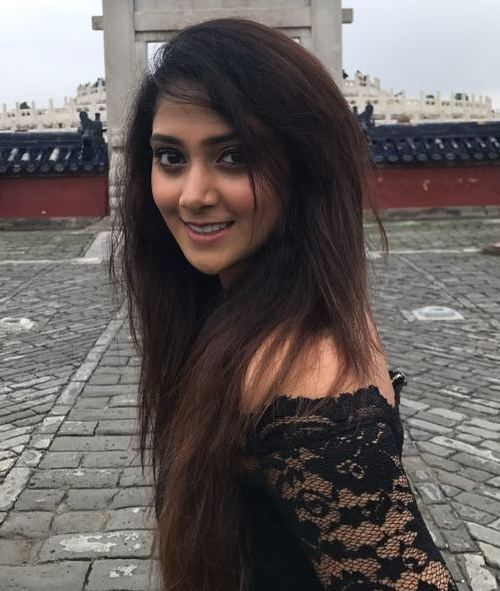
- Born: Mumbai, Maharashtra, India
- Occupations: Actress, Model, Dentist
- Years active: 2012–2020

Natasha Doshi Shah is an Indian actress and model who appears in Malayalam and Telugu films. She made her debut in 2012 with Manthrikan, directed by Anil Kumar.

== Early life ==
Born in Mumbai, Doshi began acting in childhood and is also a trained classical dancer. . She was awarded Miss Talented in Miss Kerala 2010.

== Career ==
Her first appearance in film was in a documentary horror-comedy film called Manthrikan. In the same year, she played Gowri in a Malayalam film Hide N' Seek, loosely based on a South Korean romantic drama film 3-Iron. Although the films did not do well commercially, she was signed up for Call me @, a Malayalam film directed by Francis Thannikal and, later on, in Cappuccino, directed by Naushad, a Malayalam romantic comedy where she performs the lead role of Janaki. Doshi gained further recognition for her casting by veteran director K. S. Ravikumar for his Telugu action drama film Jai Simha where she performed along with Nayanthara and Nandamuri Balakrishna.

== Filmography ==
Year	Film	Role	Language	Notes	Ref
2012	Manthrikan	Dia	Malayalam	Malayalam debut	
2012	Hide N' Seek	Gowri	Malayalam		
2014	Call Me @	Priyamvada	Malayalam		
2017	Cappuccino	Janaki	Malayalam		
2018	Jai Simha	Dhanya	Telugu	Telugu debut	
2018	Kothala Rayudu	Dhanalakshmi	Telugu		
2020	Entha Manchivaadavuraa	Special appearance in Jaataro Jaatar song	Telugu		
