= Challagariga =

- village
- Country: India
- State: Telangana
- District: Warangal

Population
  - Total: 10,000+

Languages
  - Official: Telugu
- Time zone: UTC+5:30 (IST)
- Vehicle registration: TG
- Nearest city: Warangal
- Lok Sabha constituency: Warangal
- Vidhan Sabha constituency: Bhoopalpally(108)
- Website: telangana.gov.in

Challagariga is a village in Hanamkonda district, Telangana, in the state of Telangana in India. It is located 55 km (34 mi) from Warangal city.
