= Chandrabose (lyricist) =

Lyricist in Telugu cinema

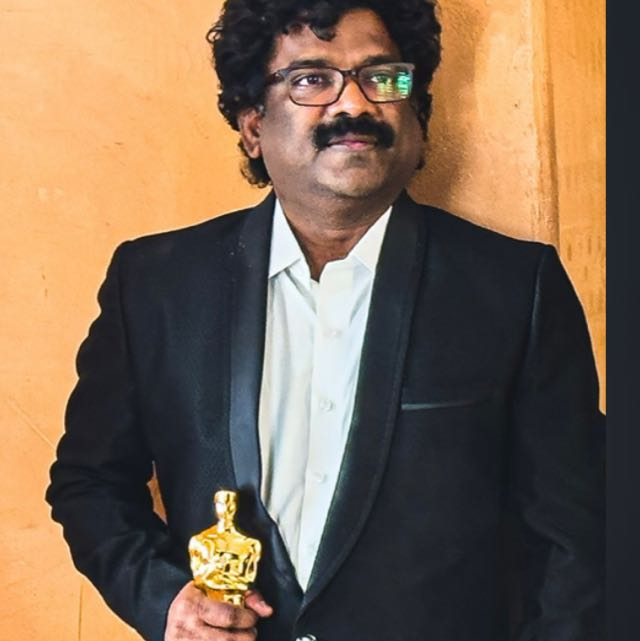
- Chandrabose in 2023
- Born: Kanukuntla Subhash Chandrabose; 1970 (age 55–56); Challagariga, Andhra Pradesh, India (now in Telangana, India)
- Education: Jawaharlal Nehru Technological University, Hyderabad
- Occupations: Lyricist; playback singer
- Notable work: Kushi (2001 film), Naani, Tagore (film), 1: Nenokkadine, Nannaku Prematho, Rangasthalam, Pushpa: The Rise, RRR, Pushpa 2: The Rule
- Spouse: Suchitra Chandrabose

Kanukuntla Subhash Chandrabose is an Indian lyricist and singer who works in Telugu cinema. Chandrabose debuted as a lyricist with the 1995 film Taj Mahal. In a career spanning over 25 years, he has written lyrics for about 3600 songs in over 850 films. Chandrabose won an Academy Award and a Golden Globe Award for the song "Naatu Naatu" from RRR (2022). He has received one National Award, two Nandi Awards, two Filmfare Awards, and three SIIMA Awards as a lyricist.

== Early life and career ==
Chandrabose was born in the village of Challagariga of Warangal district, Andhra Pradesh, India (now in Bhupalpally district, Telangana, India), where he completed high school. He is the youngest of four siblings, and his father worked as a primary school teacher. He earned a degree in Electrical and Electronics Engineering from Jawaharlal Nehru Technological University, Hyderabad. Early in his career, he tried working as a singer in Doordarshan, without success. He then decided to switch to working as a lyricist.

He entered the film industry with Muppalaneni Shiva's film Taj Mahal (1995). Music director M. M. Srilekha helped him with his first film song, "Manchu Kondallona Chandramaa" in 1995. He adopted Chandrabose as his screen name on the advice of his first director Muppalaneni Siva.

== Family life ==
Chandrabose married Suchitra, a choreographer in the Telugu film industry. He has one son Nanda Vanamali and one daughter Amrita Varshini. He has two brothers (Rajender, Koti) and a sister (Swaroopa).

== Filmography ==
- Taj Mahal (1995)
- Dharma Chakram (1996)
- Oho Naa Pellanta (1996)
- Pattukondi Chuddam (1997)
- Pelli Sandadi (1997)
- Master (1997)
- Choodalani Vundi (1998)
- Bavagaru Bagunnara? (1998)
- Premante Idera (1998)
- Iddaru Mitrulu (1999)
- Thammudu (1999)
- Jayam Manade Raa (2000)
- Santhi Nivasam (2000)
- Azad (2000)
- Murari (2000)
- Budget Padmanabham (2001)
- Mrigaraju (2001)
- Manjunatha (2001)
- Kushi (2001)
- Daddy (2001)
- Student No.1 (2001)
- Hanuman Junction (2001)
- Takkari Donga (2002)
- Avunu Valliddaru Ista Paddaru! (2002)
- Aadi (2002)
- Chennakesava Reddy (2002)
- Gangotri (2003)
- Amma Nanna O Tamila Ammayi (2003)
- Dil (2003)
- Johnny (2003)
- Tagore (2003)
- Abhimanyu (2003)
- Lakshmi Narasimha (2004)
- Anji (2004)
- Athade Oka Sainyam (2004)
- Nenunnanu (2004)
- Arya (2004)
- Naani (2004)
- Samba (2004)
- Naa Autograph (2004)
- Gudumba Shankar (2004)
- Sye (2004)
- Shankar Dada MBBS (2004)
- Balu (2005)
- Chakram (2005)
- Subhash Chandra Bose (2005)
- Athanokkade (2005)
- Andarivaadu (2005)
- Andhrudu (2005)
- Allari Bullodu (2005)
- Bunny (2005 film) (2005) - 3 songs
- Chatrapathi (2005)
- Bhageeratha (2005)
- Jai Chiranjeeva (2005)
- Happy (2006)
- Ranam (2006)
- Vikramarkudu (2006)
- Bommarillu (2006)
- Sainikudu (2006)
- Khatarnak (2006)
- Annavaram (2006)
- Okka Magaadu (2007)
- Lakshyam (2007)
- Idea Super Singer (2009)
- Magadheera (2009)
- Oy! (2009)
- Bendu Apparao R.M.P (2009)
- Arya 2 (2009)
- Adhurs (2010)
- Simha (2010)
- Komaram Puli (2010)
- Nagavalli (2010)
- 100% Love (2011)
- Badrinath (2011)
- Panjaa (2011)
- Shadow (2013)
- Varna (2013, dubbed version)
- Thoofan (2013, bilingual film)
- 1: Nenokkadine (2014)
- Manam (2014)
- Alludu Seenu (2014)
- Rey (2016)
- I (2015, dubbed version)
- Mayuri (2015)
- Subramanyam for Sale (2015)
- Tripura (2015)
- Nannaku Prematho (2016)
- Dhruva (2016)
- Nenu Local (2017)
- Vunnadhi Okate Zindagi (2017)
- Jaya Janaki Nayaka (2017)
- Jai Lava Kusa (2017)
- Hello (2017)
- Inttelligent (2018)
- Rangasthalam (2018)
- Nuvvu Thopu Raa (2019)
- Mallesham (2019)
- 90ML (2019)
- Sye Raa Narasimha Reddy (2019)
- 30 Rojullo Preminchadam Ela (2020)
- Sashi (2021)
- Kanabadutaledu (2021)
- Devarakondalo Vijay Premakatha (2021)
- Pushpa: The Rise (2021)
- Konda Polam (2021)
- RRR (2022)
- Waltair Veerayya (2023)
- Agent (2023)
- Ghar Banduk Biryani (2023)
- Ponniyin Selvan: II (2023, Telugu dubbed version)
- Ahimsa (2023)
- Jawan (2023, Telugu dubbed version)
- Love Me (2024)
- Aho Vikramaarka (2024)
- Indian 2 (2024, dubbed version)
- Purushothamudu (2024)
- Alanaati Ramchandrudu (2024)
- Pushpa 2: The Rule (2024)
- Mazaka (2025)
- Oka Brundavanam (2025)
- Kuberaa (2025) - 1 song
- Hari Hara Veera Mallu (2025)
- 3BHK (2025, Telugu dubbed version)
- Champion (2025)
- Bhartha Mahasayulaku Wignyapthi (2026)
- Anaganaga Oka Raju (2026)
- Band Melam (2026)
- Bad Boy Karthik (2026)

== Awards and nominations ==
Academy Awards

- Best Original Song for "Naatu Naatu" in RRR (2022)
Nandi Awards

- Best Lyricist for "Nee Navvula Thelladanaanni" in Aadi (2002)
- Best Lyricist for "Cheekatito Veluge Cheppenu Nenunnanani" in Nenunnanu (2004)

Filmfare Awards South

- Best Lyricist – Telugu for "Kanipinchina Maa Amma" in Manam (2014)
- Best Lyricist – Telugu for "Entha Sakkagunnave" in Rangasthalam (2018)

SIIMA Awards

- Best Lyricist – Telugu for "Kanipinchina Maa Amma" from Manam (2014)
- Best Lyricist – Telugu for "Entha Sakkagunnave" from Rangasthalam (2018)
- Best Lyricist – Telugu for "Srivalli" from Pushpa: The Rise (2022)

Zee Cine Awards Telugu

- Best Lyricist for "Jigelu Rani" from Rangasthalam (2018)

National Film Awards

- Best Lyrics for "Dham Dham Dham" from Konda Polam (2021)

Critics' Choice Movie Awards

- Critics' Choice Movie Award for Best Song for "Naatu Naatu" in RRR (2022)

Golden Globe Awards

- Golden Globe Award for Best Original Song for "Naatu Naatu" in RRR (2022)

Santosham Film Awards

- Best Lyricist for Pushpa: The Rise (2022)
- Best Lyricist for RRR (2023)

Doctorate

- Honorary Doctorate for Literary Arts in SR University (November 2023)

Gurajada Visishta Puraskaram

- Gurajada Visishta Puraskaram award for Telugu Literature in Andhrapradesh (2023)

Cannes World Film Festival

- Best Documentary Award for Oscar Challagariga (November 2023)

== Notable songs ==
- "Manchu Kondallona Chandramaa" - Taj Mahal (1995)
- "Chai Chatukkuna Tagara Bhai" - Mrugaraju (2001)
- "Evaremi Anukunna" - Budget Padmanabham (2001)
- "Ekkado Putti Ekkado Perigi" - Student No.1 (2001)
- "Nee Navvula Thelladanaanni" - Aadi (2002)
- "Nuvvu Chudu Chudakapo" - Okato Number Kurradu (2002)
- "Telugu Bhasha Theeyadanam" in Neeku Nenu Naaku Nuvvu (2003)
- "Kodithe Kottali Ra Six Kottali" - Tagore (2003)
- "Cheekatito Veluge Cheppenu Nenunnanani" - Nenunnanu (2004)
- "Feel My Love" - Arya (2004)
- "Pedave Palikina" - Naani (2004)
- "Namasthe Namasthe Neeku Namasthe" - Samba (2004)
- "Chiraloni Goppatanam Telusuko" - Pallakilo Pellikuthuru (2004)
- "Mounamgane Edagamani" - Naa Autograph (2004)
- "Inthe inthinthe inthe inthinthe" - Balu (2005)
- "Jai Jai Ganesa Jai Kodatha Ganesa" - Jai Chiranjeeva (2005)
- "Panchadhara Bomma Bomma" - Magadheera (2009)
- "Desamante Matham Kaadoy" - Jhummandi Naadam (2010)
- "Aakaasam Ammayaithe" - Gabbar Singh (2012)
- "Sai Ante Thalli" - Shiridi Sai (2012)
- "Lali Lali Jo Lali" - Damarukam (2012)
- "Sayonara Sayonara" - 1: Nenokkadine (2014)
- "Jigelu Rani" - Rangasthalam (2018)
- "Ee Sethithone" - Rangasthalam (2018)
- "Dham Dham Dham" - Konda Polam (2021)
- "Naatu Naatu" - RRR (2022)
