= CK Entertainments =

Indian film production company

CK Entertainments Private Limited
- Type: Private
- Industry: Entertainment
- Founded: Hyderabad, Andhra Pradesh in 2011
- Headquarters: Hyderabad, India
- Key people: C Kalyan
- Products: Films
- Owner: C Kalyan

CK Entertainments Private Limited is an Indian film production company established by C Kalyan, an Indian film producer. The company is based in Hyderabad.Telugu movies produced by the company Jyothi Lakshmi,and Jai Simha.

== Production company and success ==
C Kalyan established CK Entertainments Private Limited in 2011. The first movie that was made under the banner was Chandrakala directed by Sundar C In 2015 Jyothi Lakshmi directed by Puri Jagannadh. In 2015, they made another film Loafer under the direction of Puri Jagannadh. In 2017, they made Jai Simha under the direction of K. S. Ravikumar and released the movie on 2018 Pongal. In 2017 they are also made Intelligent under the direction of V. V. Vinayak and released in February 2018.

== Film Production ==
Year	Film	Actors	Director	Note
2015	Jyothi Lakshmi	Charmy Kaur	Puri Jagannadh	
2015	Loafer	Varun Tej, Disha Patani	Puri Jagannadh	
2018	Jai Simha	Nandamuri Balakrishna, Nayanthara, Hariprriya	K. S. Ravikumar	
2018	Inttelligent	Sai Dharam Tej, Lavanya Tripathi	V. V. Vinayak	
2019	Ruler	Nandamuri Balakrishna, Vedhika	K. S. Ravikumar	
