= Chitra Shukla =

Indian actress

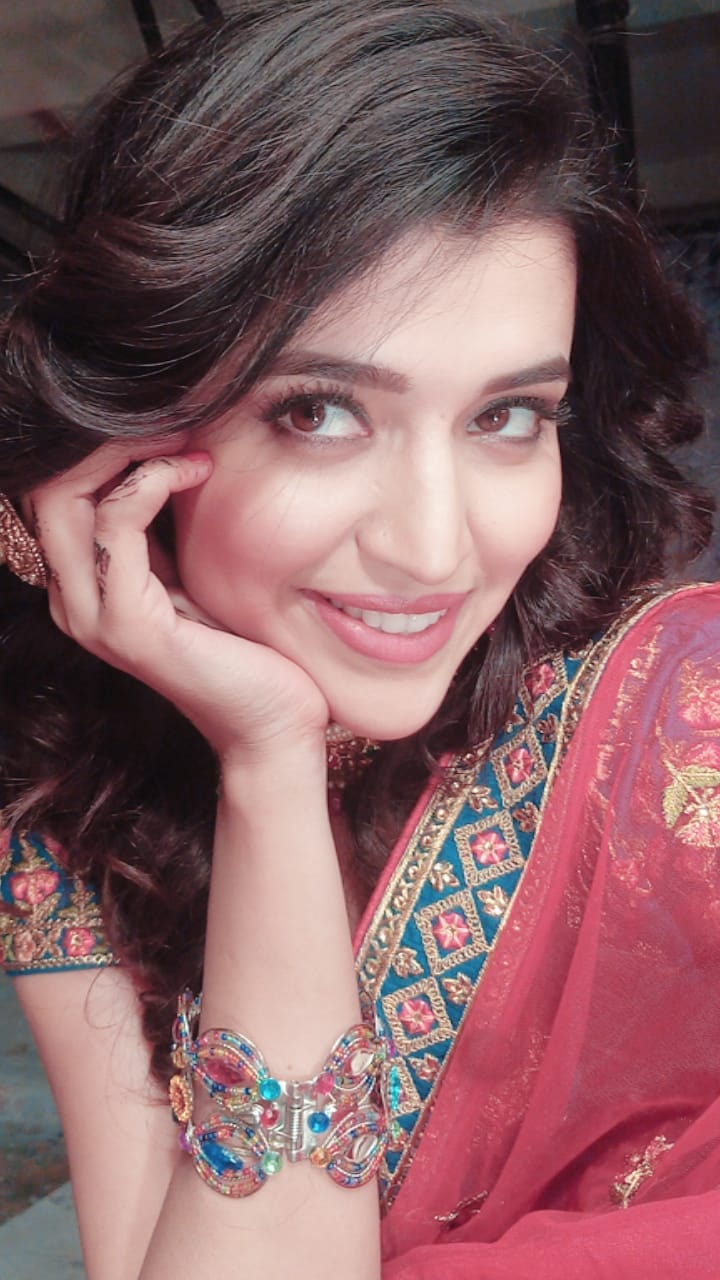
- Born: 11 May 1993 (age 33); Indore, Madhya Pradesh, India
- Occupation: Actor
- Years active: 2014–present

Chitra Shukla is an Indian actress who works predominantly in Telugu films.

== Career ==
She made her debut with Maa Abbayi opposite Sree Vishnu, which marked her Telugu lead debut. Chitra was signed for Maa Abbayi when the makers of the film noticed her in a song from Nenu Sailaja (2016). She went on to work with Raj Tarun in Rangula Ratnam and Allari Naresh in Silly Fellows. Her upcoming films include Kaadal, a love story set in 2004, and Naa Naa a Tamil film starring Sasikumar.

== Filmography ==
Year	Title	Role	Language	Notes
2014	Chal Bhaag	Dancer	Hindi	Cameo appearance in the song "Madam Ji"
2015	Puli	Herself	Tamil	Cameo appearance in the song "Yaendi Yaendi"
2016	Nenu Sailaja	Theatregoer	Telugu	Cameo appearance in song "Crazy Feeling"
2017	Maa Abbayi	Ammudu	Telugu	Debut as lead actress
2017	Jani	Herself	Kannada	Kannada debut; special appearance in the song "Bangade Bangade"
2018	Rangula Ratnam	Keerthy	Telugu	
2018	Silly Fellows	Sub-Inspector Vasanthi	Telugu	
2021	Thellavarithe Guruvaram	Dr. Krishnaveni	Telugu	
2022	Pakka Commercial	Amulya	Telugu	
2022	Uniki	Subbalakshmi IAS	Telugu	
2023	Hunt	Nivetha	Telugu	
2024	Masthu Shades Unnai Raa		Telugu	
2024	Kaliyugam Pattanamlo		Telugu	
2024	Aho Vikramaarka	Archana	Telugu	
2025	Daksha: The Deadly Conspiracy		Telugu	
