= Rangula Ratnam (2018 film) =

2018 Indian Telugu-language film directed by Shreeranjani

- Film poster
- Directed by: Shreeranjani
- Written by: Shreeranjani
- Produced by: Nagarjuna
- Starring: Raj Tarun; Chitra Shukla
- Cinematography: L. K. Vijay
- Edited by: A. Sreekar Prasad
- Music by: Sricharan Pakala
- Production company: Annapurna Studios
- Release date: 14 January 2018
- Running time: 134 minutes
- Country: India
- Language: Telugu

Rangula Ratnam (transl. Wheel of color) is a 2018 Indian Telugu-language romantic drama film starring Raj Tarun and Chitra Shukla.

== Plot ==
Vishnu is a software engineer who is attached to his widowed mother and falls in love with Keerthi, who is a stickler for traffic rules and annoys Vishnu. Vishnu's life turns upside down when his mother dies in sleep from a hidden illness. Unable to recover from his mother's death, Vishnu proposes to Keerthi, who goes to a camp and accepts his love. Vishnu goes to the camp and brings Keerthi back, where they profess their love for each other. After a near death experience when Vishnu stops for a break, she is scared of losing Vishnu. When Vishnu stops at a tea stall near her home, she cuts him off saying she is not interested in love and leaves.

When Vishnu tries to reach out, Keerthi tells that she loves him, but doesn't want any relationship indicating a past story. Keerthi reveals that her loving father died in a bus accident on her birthday and is fearful of relationships because of the fear of losing them. Vishnu takes her to the temple and assures her God will take care of them. Keerthi is assured and they start enjoying each other's company. Keerthi starts being too concerned with safety of Vishnu pushing his buttons. Vishnu and his friend get into a fight with some local youth and ends up drinking with them. Meanwhile, Keerthi is worried sick about this and catches Vishnu's lies. On a trip to a countryside for his friend's child naming ceremony, Keerthi's overbearing nature becomes too much for Vishnu.

To add to the woes, An astrologer predicts that night travel might be dangerous for a month for Vishnu. They take a bus away from the group back to the city. Vishnu breaks up from Keerthi over this restricting nature of Keerthi. Keerthi slowly realises her mistake and apologizes to Vishnu. Vishnu finds solace in his mother's voice notes and realises that Keerthi takes care of him exactly like his mother and that he needs her back. Vishnu goes to Keerthi's house to find her house locked and the household gone to a wedding. Fearing it s Keerthi's wedding, Vishnu reaches the venue to find to his relief that is not Keerthi's wedding. Vishnu makes up with Keerthi asking her to continue being protective of him, where they secretly get married and leave the venue.

== Cast ==
- Raj Tarun as Vishnu
- Chitra Shukla as Keerthi
- Sithara as Vishnu's mother
- Priyadarshi as Vishnu's friend
- Ravi Prakash as Keerthi's father
- Ravi Siva Teja

== Production ==
Raj Tarun and Chitra Shukla were signed to play the leads while veteran actress Sithara was brought in to play a pivotal role. The film is produced by Annapoorna Studios and was scheduled to release on 14 January, coinciding with Sankranthi. The film is directed by Shreeranjani, who previously worked as an assistant to Selvaraghavan for the Tamil film, 7G Rainbow Colony (2004). After writing a song for Kittu Unnadu Jagratha (2017), Raj Tarun also wrote a song for this film.

== Soundtrack ==
The songs were composed by Sricharan Pakala.

| No. | Title | Lyrics | Singer(s) | Length |
|---|---|---|---|---|
| 1. | "Yemaindhi" | Rakendu Mouli | Yazin Nizar, Yamini Ghantasala | 3:27 |
| 2. | "Rey Vishnu (Version 1)" | Kittu Vissaparagada | Anurag Kulkarni | 2:19 |
| 3. | "Birthday" | Pranav Chaganty | Sangeetha Rajeev, Anurag Kulkarni | 3:53 |
| 4. | "Enno Enno" | Kittu Vissaparagada | Sricharan Pakala | 3:55 |
| 5. | "Nuvvu Leni" | Sirivennela Sitarama Sastry | Kaala Bhairava | 5:10 |
| 6. | "Prema Prema" | Raj Tarun | Poojan Kohli | 3:50 |
| 7. | "Rey Vishnu (Version 2)" | Kittu Vissaparagada | Anurag Kulkarni | 2:16 |
| 8. | "Rey Vishnu (Version 3)" | Kittu Vissaparagada | Anurag Kulkarni | 2:18 |
| Total length: | | | | 26:38 |

== Release ==
The film had a below average run at the box office.

The Times of India gave the film a rating of two out of five stars and wrote that "Rangula Raatnam is old wine in an antique bottle and it doesn’t even pretend to be otherwise!". Telangana Today wrote that "Though director Shreeranjani has a rather slim plot, her narrative lacing different elements such as mother-son bonding, contrasting approaches seeking a common ground and friendships and relations, is appreciable".

=== Home media ===
The satellite rights of the film were acquired by Zee Telugu.
