= Silly Fellows =

- Theatrical release poster
- Directed by: Bhimaneni Srinivasa Rao
- Screenplay by: Bhimaneni Srinivasa Rao
- Story by: S. Ezhil
- Based on: Velainu Vandhutta Vellaikaaran
- Produced by: Kiran Reddy; Bharath Chowdary; T. G. Vishwa Prasad; Vivek Kuchibhotla
- Starring: Allari Naresh; Sunil; Chitra Shukla; Nandini Rai; Jaya Prakash Reddy
- Cinematography: Anish Tharun Kumar
- Edited by: Goutham Raju
- Music by: Sri Vasanth
- Production companies: Blue Planet Entertainments LLP; People Media Factory
- Release date: 6 September 2018
- Country: India
- Language: Telugu

Silly Fellows is a 2018 Indian Telugu-language comedy film starring Allari Naresh, Sunil, Chitra Shukla, Nandini Rai, and Jaya Prakash Reddy in lead roles. It is directed by Bhimaneni Srinivasa Rao. Produced by Kiran Reddy, Bharath Chowdary, T. G. Vishwa Prasad and Vivek Kuchibhotla under the banner Blue Planet Entertainments LLP and People Media Factory. It the official remake of the 2016 Tamil film Velainu Vandhutta Vellaikaaran.

== Plot ==
Veerababu's tricks his friend Soori into marrying Pushpa while Veerababu falls in love with Vasanthi. As problems start to rise, Veerababu and Soori goes to MLA Jacket Janaki Ram, who in spite of all of the problems falls into a coma. How Janaki Ram recovers from the coma to file Soori's divorce and fix Veerababu's land issues forms the rest of the story.

== Cast ==
- Allari Naresh as Veerababu
- Sunil as Suribabu (Pushpa Mogudu)
- Chitra Shukla as Vasanthi
- Jaya Prakash Reddy as MLA Jacket Janakiram
- Brahmanandam as Fake DGP
- Nandini Rai as Pushpa
- Posani Krishna Murali as Prasad
- Poorna as Krishnaveni
- Raja Ravindra as Lanka Bangaru Raju
- Chalapathi Rao
- Raghu Karumanchi as Abhijit, Prasad's sidekick
- Jhansi as Vasanthi's Mom
- Hema as Jacket Janakiram's wife
- Sivannarayana Naripeddi as Doctor

== Soundtrack ==
The soundtrack and background score were composed by Sri Vasanth.The audio rights of the soundtrack were purchased by Aditya Music.

Track listing
No.	Title	Lyrics	Singer(s)	Length
1.	"Headache Ra Mama Headache"	Kasarla Shyam	Penchal Das	3:59
2.	"Pilla Nee Buggalu"	Chilaka Rekka Ganesh	Rahul Sipligunj	3:12
3.	"Silly Fellows"	Kasarla Shyam	Geetha Vasanth, Master Sri Charan, and Pranav Chaganty	2:28
Total length:				09:39

== Reception ==
Vyas of The Hans India rated the film two and one-fourth out of five stars and wrote, "The weak characterizations played the spoil sport for the movie. The movie lacks freshness and it is too predictable. With no proper story and screenplay, the director just tried to pull off the movie which didn't happen." Suhas Yellapantula of The Times of India gave the film one-and-a-half out of five stars and wrote, "With a senseless plot, amateurish writing and loud, over-the-top humour, Silly Fellows is as silly as they come. Disappointing!" Kumar Siva of India Herald wrote, "With mediocre music and editing, Silly Fellows is what you should not even watch when you are extremely silly and free."
