= Hasnabad, Kodangal =

Hasnabad or Husunabad is a small village in Kodangal mandal, Vikarabad district, Telangana, India.
