= Jai Simha =

- Theatrical release poster
- Directed by: K. S. Ravikumar
- Screenplay by: K. S. Ravikumar
- Dialogues by: M. Rathnam
- Story by: M. Rathnam
- Produced by: C. Kalyan
- Starring: Nandamuri Balakrishna; Nayanthara
- Cinematography: C. Ramprasad
- Edited by: Praveen Antony
- Music by: Chirantan Bhatt
- Production company: CK Entertainments
- Release date: 12 January 2018
- Running time: 164 minutes
- Country: India
- Language: Telugu
- Box office: est.₹50 crore

Jai Simha (Note: Spelt as Jaisimha on the CBFC certificate and title card.) (transl. Victory to Simha!) is a 2018 Indian Telugu-language action comedy film produced by C. Kalyan on C. K. Entertainments banner and directed by K. S. Ravikumar. It stars Nandamuri Balakrishna, Nayanthara, Haripriya, and Natasha Doshi. The music was composed by Chirantan Bhatt. The film was a box office Hit.

== Cast ==
- Nandamuri Balakrishna as Narasimha
- Nayanthara as Gauri, Master's daughter and Narasimha's love interest
- Haripriya as Manga, Narasimha's wife
- Natasha Doshi as Dhanya, Murali Krishna's daughter
- Prakash Raj as Master
- Ashutosh Rana as Thota Rami Reddy
- Brahmanandam as Santhanam
- K. S. Ravikumar as Judge
- Murali Mohan as Murali Krishna
- Prabhakar as Kaniyappan
- Jaya Prakash Reddy as Central Minister Veera Raghava Reddy
- Chalapathi Rao as MP
- Sivaji Raja as Ranga
- Pavithra Lokesh as Vasantha, Thota Rami Reddy's wife
- Priya as Raju Reddy's wife
- Sandhya Janak as Dharmakarta's wife
- L. B. Sriram as Chief Priest
- Kartar Cheema as ACP K. Prasath
- Ravi Prakash as Shaam
- Duvvasi Mohan
- Chatrapathi Sekhar
- C. Ranganathan
- Bhadram
- Visweswara Rao
- Sekhar Varma as Ravi Shankar Reddy, Rami Reddy's son

== Soundtrack ==
Jai Simha

Film score by Chirantan Bhatt
- Released: 4 January 2018
- Recorded: 2016
- Genre: Soundtrack
- Length: 21:53
- Label: Aditya Music
- Producer: Chirantan Bhatt

Chirantan Bhatt chronology
Jolly LLB 2 (2017)	Jai Simha (2018)	Kesari (2019)

Music was composed by Chirantan Bhatt. Music released by Aditya Music Company. The audio function was held on 24 December 2016 at Vijayawada by Nara Lokesh, Cabinet Minister of A.P.

No.	Title	Lyrics	Singer(s)	Length
1.	"Anaganaga Anaganaga"	Sri Mani	Vijay Yesudas	5:12
2.	"Priyam Jagame"	Ramajogayya Sastry	Revanth, Ramya Behara	4:25
3.	"Ammakutti Ammakutti"	Bhaskarbhatla	Jaspreet Jasz, Geetha Madhuri	4:42
4.	"Yevevo Yevevo"	Bhaskarabhatla	Revanth, Shreya Ghoshal	3:44
5.	"Jai Simha Theme"	Noel Sean	Vivek Hariharan, Noel Sean, Aditya Iyenger	3:40
Total length:				21:53

== Reception ==
The film received mixed to positive reviews. 123 telugu.com gave it 3 / 5 stars saying " Balakrishna is the biggest asset of the film. It is purely a film made to elevate Balakrishna and his character Narasimha ". The Hindu gave a more favourable review and said that the film "gives a good contemporary action spin to an emotional story".
