= Anasuya Bharadwaj =

Indian television presenter, actress (born 1975)

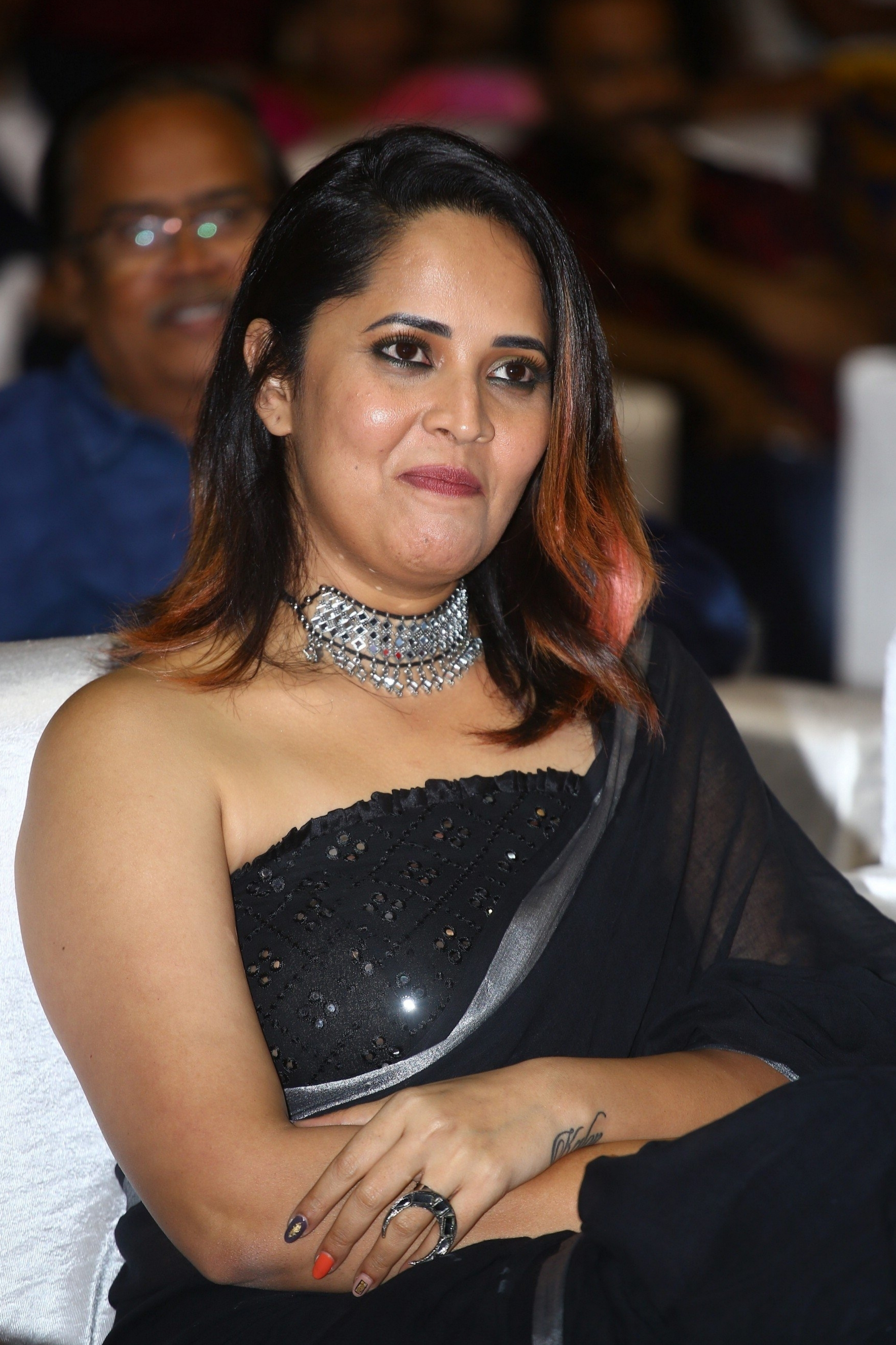
- Bharadwaj in 2018
- Born: 15 May 1985 (age 41); Hyderabad, Andhra Pradesh, India
- Education: Badruka College (MBA)
- Occupations: Television presenter; actress
- Years active: 2013–present
- Spouse: Susank Bharadwaj (m. 2010)
- Children: 2

Anasuya Bharadwaj (born 15 May 1985) is an Indian television presenter and actress who works in Telugu films and television. Her film credits include Kshanam (2016) and Rangasthalam (2018).

== Early life and education ==
Anasuya Bharadwaj received her MBA from Badruka College in 2008, after which she worked as an HR executive.

== Career ==
Refusing a lot of early movie offers, she worked as a news presenter for Sakshi TV. After that, Anasuya worked as an anchor on Maa music. She worked as a dubbing artist for the films Vedam (2010) and Paisa (2014).

Later on, she appeared as a TV anchor on Jabardasth, a comedy show. The show elevated her career.

In 2016, she acted in the film Soggade Chinni Nayana opposite Nagarjuna. Later, in the same year, she made her debut with Kshanam in which she portrayed a negative lead role.

As an anchor, Anasuya has hosted many awards shows, like Zee Kutumbam Awards and Star Parivaar Awards, and she has hosted Okarikokaru Awards on Zee Telugu three times. She has performed at the Apsara awards function and GAMA Awards Dubai. She hosted Devi Sri Prasad's US concert.

She acted as Rangamatta in Rangasthalam that was well acclaimed. In Pushpa: The Rise, she acted as Dakshayini that pushed her career further up.

In 2021, she contested in the elections to Movie Artists Association (MAA).

== Personal life ==
Anasuya has been married to Susank Bharadwaj since 2010 and they have two children.

== Filmography ==
=== Films ===
Key
†	Denotes films that have not yet been released

List of Anasuya Bharadwaj film credits
Year	Title	Role	Notes	Ref.
2003	Naaga	Law Student	Uncredited appearance	
2016	Soggade Chinni Nayana	Bujji	Special appearance in the song "Soggade Chinni Nayana"	
2016	Kshanam	ACP Jaya Bharadwaj		
2017	Winner	Anasuya	Special appearance in the song "Suya Suya Anasuya"	
2018	Gayathri	Shreshta Jayaram		
2018	Rangasthalam	Kolli Rangamma		
2019	F2: Fun and Frustration	Herself	Special appearance in the song "Ding Dong"	
2019	Yatra	Gowru Charitha Reddy		
2019	Kathanam	Anu / Aravinda		
2019	Meeku Maathrame Cheptha	Samyuktha		
2021	30 Rojullo Preminchadam Ela	Herself	Special appearance in the song "Wah Wah Mere Bawa"	
2021	Chaavu Kaburu Challaga	Herself	Special appearance in the song "Pina Pataram"	
2021	Thank You Brother	Priya		
2021	Pushpa: The Rise	Dakshayani		
2022	Bheeshma Parvam	Alice	Malayalam film	
2022	Khiladi	Chandrakala / Chandini		
2022	Darja	Kanaka Mahalakshmi		
2022	Godfather	Swetha Ram Prasad's wife		
2023	Michael	Charulatha		
2023	Rangamarthanda	Geetha		
2023	Vimanam	Sumathi		
2023	Peddha Kapu 1	Akkamma		
2023	Prema Vimanam	Santha		
2024	Razakar	Pochamma		
2024	Pushpa 2: The Rule	Dakshayani		
2025	Hari Hara Veera Mallu	Vanaja	Special appearance in a Song "Kollagottinadhiro"	
2025	Ari: My Name Is Nobody	Athreyi		
2026	Nagabandham: The Secret Treasure	Leelavathi		
TBA	Flashback	TBA	Tamil film	
TBA	Wolf †	TBA	Tamil film	

== Television ==
List of Anasuya Bharadwaj television credits
Year	Show	Role	Channel	Ref.
2013–22	Jabardasth	Host	ETV	
2013	Bhale Chancule	Contestant	Star Maa	
2013	Bindass	Host	Zee Telugu	
2013	Modern Mahalakshmi	Host	Star Maa	
2014	Thadaka	Host	ETV	
2014	One - No More Silly Games	Host	Zee Telugu	
2015	Konchem Touch Lo Unte Chepta	Guest	Zee Telugu	
2015–16	Boom Boom	Host	Gemini TV	
2016	A Date with Anasuya	Host	TV9	
2016	Dhee Jodi	Guest	ETV	
2016	Genes	Contestant	ETV	
2017	Naa Show Naa Ishtam	Contestant	ETV Plus	
2017	Star Maa Pariwar Awards	Host	Star Maa	
2017	Jack Pot	Host	Gemini TV	
2017	Drama Juniors Season 1	Judge	Zee Telugu	
2017	Drama Juniors season 2	Judge	Zee Telugu	
2017	Meelo Evaru Koteeswarudu	contestant	Star Maa	
2017	Jackpot-2	Host	Gemini TV	
2018	Blockbuster	Host	Gemini TV	
2018	Comedy Nights	Guest	Zee Telugu	
2018	Drama Juniors Season 3	Judge	Zee Telugu	
2018	Bigg Boss S2	Guest	Star Maa	
2018–19	Rangasthalam	Host	Gemini TV	
2019	Local Gangs	Judge	Zee Telugu	
2020	Prati Roju Pandage	Host	ETV	
2020	Thalia? Pellam??	Host	Gemini TV	
2021	MasterChef India Season 1	Presenter	Gemini TV	
2022	Aagattuntava Eegattukostava	Presenter	Star Maa	

== Awards and nominations ==
Year	Film	Award	Category	Result	Ref(s)
2017	Kshanam	2nd IIFA Utsavam	Best Supporting Actress – Telugu	Won	
2017	Kshanam	6th SIIMA Awards	SIIMA Award for Best Supporting Actress (Telugu)		
2017	Kshanam	64th Filmfare Awards South	Best Supporting Actress – Telugu	Nominated	
2019	Rangasthalam	66th Filmfare Awards South	Best Supporting Actress – Telugu	Won	
2019	Rangasthalam	8th SIIMA Awards	Best Supporting Actress – Telugu	Won	
2019	Rangasthalam	Zee Cine Awards Telugu	Best Supporting Actor – Female	Won	
