= Operation 2019 =

Indian political action drama film

- Official poster
- Directed by: Karanam P. Babji
- Produced by: Alivelu
- Starring: Srikanth; Yagna Shetty; Diksha Panth
- Cinematography: Venkat Rama Prasad
- Edited by: S. B. Uddav
- Music by: Rap Rock Shakeel
- Release date: 1 December 2018
- Country: India
- Language: Telugu

Operation 2019 is a 2018 Indian Telugu-language political action drama film directed by Karanam P. Babji and starring Srikanth, Yagna Shetty and Diksha Panth.

== Cast ==
- Srikanth as Uma Shankar
- Yagna Shetty as Umadevi
- Diksha Panth
- Sivakrishna as MLA Narayana Murthy
- Posani Krishna Murali
- Nagineedu
- Fish Venkat
- Manchu Manoj as a cop (cameo appearance)
- Sunil as himself (cameo appearance)

== Soundtrack ==
Music by Rap Rock Shakeel. In a review of the soundtrack album, Neeshi Nyayapati of The Times of India wrote that "Jarring and even annoying for most part, the numbers on this album have nothing new to offer despite featuring such established vocalists".

- "Kaka Nuvvu Keka" sung by Madhu Priya with lyrics by Ramajogayya Sastry
- "Missed Call Mini Mini" sung by Geetha Madhuri, Rap Rock Shakeel and Swarag with lyrics by Ramajogayya Sastry
- "Amrutapani Andamnadi" sung by Moushmi Neha with lyrics by Bhashashree
- "Life Is Like A Party Time" sung by Baba Sehgal with lyrics by Ramajogayya Sastry
- "Nara Naramuna" sung and lyrics by Swarag Keertan
- "Vandemataram" sung by Kaala Bhairava with lyrics by Suddala Ashok Teja

== Reception ==
Sekhar Kusuma of The Times of India Samayam gave the film a rating of 2.5 out of 5 and praised Srikanth's performance. A critic from Sakshi felt that the first half was slow and that the second half was better.
