= Rangasthalam =

2018 Indian film by Sukumar

- Theatrical release poster
- Directed by: Sukumar
- Written by: Sukumar
- Produced by: Naveen Yerneni; Yalamanchili Ravi Shankar; Mohan Cherukuri
- Starring: Ram Charan; Samantha Akkineni; Jagapathi Babu; Aadhi Pinisetty; Prakash Raj; Anasuya Bharadwaj; Pooja Hegde
- Cinematography: R. Rathnavelu
- Edited by: Naveen Nooli
- Music by: Devi Sri Prasad
- Production company: Mythri Movie Makers
- Release date: 30 March 2018
- Running time: 174 minutes
- Country: India
- Language: Telugu
- Budget: ₹60 crore
- Box office: est. ₹216 crore

Rangasthalam (transl. Stage/Theatre) is a 2018 Indian Telugu-language period action drama film written and directed by Sukumar. Produced by Y. Naveen, Y. Ravi Shankar and C. V. Mohan for the company Mythri Movie Makers, the film stars Ram Charan and Samantha with, Jagapathi Babu, Naresh, Prakash Raj, Aadhi Pinisetty, and Anasuya Bharadwaj in key supporting roles. Rangasthalam is set in the eponymous fictional village in the 1980s. It narrates the story of two brothers, Chittibabu (Charan) and Kumar Babu (Pinisetty) who oppose the village's local government and the corrupt co-operative society led by its president Phanindra Bhupathi (Babu).

Sukumar started working on the film's script after completing Nannaku Prematho (2016), and collaborated with R. Rathnavelu, who served as the director of photography. Devi Sri Prasad composed the film's soundtrack and score; Naveen Nooli edited the film. One of the first few Indian films to be entirely shot using Red Helium 8K cameras, Rangasthalam's principal photography began in April 2017 with the working title RC11 and lasted until March 2018. Majorly filmed in a village set worth ₹5 crore erected in Hyderabad, ten percent of the film's footage was shot in and around Rajamahendravaram.

The film was made on a budget of ₹60 crore, and was released globally on 30 March 2018. Rangasthalam received positive reviews from the critics who were particularly appreciative of Sukumar's writing and the performances of the ensemble cast, especially of Ram Charan and Jagapathi Babu although they criticized the length. The film was commercially successful, grossing a total of ₹216 crore, and became Ram Charan's highest grossing film until RRR(2022). It is among the highest-grossing Telugu films. It also won the National Film Award for Best Audiography. A Kannada-dubbed version of the film titled Rangasthala was released on 12 July 2019. The film is considered one of the "25 Greatest Telugu Films Of The Decade" by Film Companion. It also won the state Gaddar Award for Second Best Feature Film.

== Plot ==
Set in the 1980s in the village of Rangasthalam, the story follows Chittibabu, a partially deaf, resilient, and somewhat cantankerous villager who earns a living irrigating fields with a diesel motor. The village is dominated by the powerful Panchayat President, Phanindra Bhupathi, whose cooperative "Society" exploits the local populace through predatory interest rates and property seizures. The systemic oppression drives a villager, Erra Srinu, to suicide, setting a grim tone for the village's political climate.

Chittibabu’s life is disrupted when his elder brother, Kumar Babu, returns from working in the Persian Gulf. Witnessing the rampant corruption and the exploitation of illiterate farmers by Bhupathi, Kumar Babu resolves to challenge the status quo. During this time, Chittibabu navigates his own romantic life, pursuing a relationship with a local woman named Ramalakshmi. Despite initial misunderstandings caused by his hearing impairment, the two eventually reconcile and develop a deep bond.

Kumar Babu decides to contest the Panchayat elections, aiming to dismantle Bhupathi’s thirty-year unopposed grip on the village. He gains the support of the villagers by exposing the Society's fraudulent practices and encouraging them to seek political representation. As the campaign intensifies, Chittibabu learns from a villager named Rangamma that Bhupathi is responsible for the systematic murders of those who dared to oppose him, including Rangamma's own husband. Though briefly tempted by Bhupathi's bribes to sabotage his brother, Chittibabu ultimately remains loyal to Kumar Babu.

Bhupathi’s grip on power weakens as his crimes come to light, and he begins to lose control, eventually killing his own associate, Seshu Naidu, in a fit of rage. In a tragic turn, Kumar Babu is ambushed and fatally wounded while returning from a meeting with his love interest, Padma. Chittibabu arrives to defend him, but Kumar Babu is killed by a veiled assailant before he can identify his attacker. In his final moments, he attempts to speak, but Chittibabu fails to interpret his dying message.

Following his brother’s death, Chittibabu becomes consumed by a desire for vengeance and initiates a relentless hunt for Bhupathi. Meanwhile, Rangamma is elected President of the Panchayat. Believing that the key to his brother’s killer lies with the local MLA, Dakshina Murthy, Chittibabu discovers Murthy has been involved in a severe hit-and-run accident. He spends the next two years selflessly caring for the comatose politician, waiting for him to regain consciousness.

Upon Murthy’s recovery, Chittibabu meets him at his residence, revealing to have killed Bhupathi but confronts him for orchestrating Kumar Babu's murder. Motivated by rigid caste-based prejudice, Murthy had ordered his henchman, Srimannarayana, to assassinate Kumar Babu to terminate his relationship with Padma, Murthy’s daughter. Chittibabu, having kept Murthy alive specifically to exact his revenge when the politician had the most to lose, quietly executes him. The narrative concludes with Chittibabu reuniting with Ramalakshmi, having finally avenged his brother and closed the chapter on the village's corruption.

== Cast ==
- Ram Charan as Chelluboina Chitti Babu
- Aadhi Pinisetty as Chelluboina Kumar Babu, Chitti Babu’s elder brother
- Samantha as Ramalachimi, Chitti Babu’s love interest
- Jagapathi Babu as President Phanindra Bhupathi
- Naresh as Koteswara Rao
- Prakash Raj as Dakshina Murthy, The Local MLA
- Rohini as Kantham, mother of Chittibabu, Kumar Babu and Chinni
- Rajeev Kanakala as Ramprasad, Rangamma's late husband
- Anasuya Bharadwaj as Kolli Rangamma, later becomes President
- Pujita Ponnada as Padma, Kumar Babu's love interest
- Annie as Chinni, sister of Chittibabu and Kumar Babu
- Brahmaji as Tehsildar
- Prudhvi Raj
- Banerjee as Dr. Seetharam, Dakshina Murthy's doctor
- Satya as Veera Babu, a grey-shaded villager
- Ajay Ghosh as Seshu Naidu
- Kadambari Kiran
- Jogi Naidu
- Krishnamraju
- Shaking Seshu as Somaraju
- Mahesh Achanta as Mahesh
- Shatru as Kaasi, well-wisher of Kumar Babu and Chittibabu
- Noel Sean as Erra Srinu
- Chatrapathi Sekhar as Ganapathi, a saint who warns Chittibabu about Bhupathi
- Getup Srinu
- Pammi Sai
- Naveen Neni as Kaasi's brother
- Amit Sharma as Srimannarayana, Dakshina Murthy's close confidant
- FM Babai
- Sudhakar Mishra as Businessman
- Vajja Venkata Giridhar as Abbulu
- Muralidhar Goud
- Naga Mahesh as Ramalachimi's father
- Pooja Hegde in a special appearance in the song "Jigelu Rani"

== Production ==
=== Development ===
Writer and filmmaker Sukumar discussed the possibility of directing a rural drama with his regular collaborator, cinematographer R. Rathnavelu before the production of the former's directorial 1: Nenokkadine (2014). After completing Nannaku Prematho (2016), Sukumar narrated two story lines to Rathnavelu: a contemporary film with an Indian green revolution backdrop, and a rural drama. Rathnavelu chose the latter and suggested to make it a period drama as it would give them an opportunity to showcase the local culture more effectively. He felt more like a member of the direction team than being a cinematographer during the film's production: "You’ve to think like him [Sukumar] while working with him, and getting into the psychology of the characters helps a lot."

Sukumar approached Mythri Movie Makers in October 2016, and the latter agreed to bankroll the film. The production team wanted to shoot the film in Araku Valley, but Rathnavelu was opposed to the idea. He opined that Rangasthalam is a film which "drew a lot from the locations that it was going to be shot in". The film's crew scouted to locations near Rajamahendravaram and the Godavari region, and found areas near Kolleru Lake apt for the film's periodic setting. Rathanavelu found acres of grasslands by the riverside. They made it the entrance of the village, a "killing field" where people are murdered, to create an "eerie" mood in the film. Rathnavelu opted for a "muted and earthy" colour palette with no bright shades of yellow, red and blue.

Naveen Nooli, who earlier collaborated with Sukumar for Nannaku Prematho, was signed as the editor. Impressed with their work in Jyo Achyutananda (2016), Sukumar chose Ramakrishna and Mounika to handle both art direction and production design. The film's production formally commenced on 26 February 2017 with the working title RC11. Sukumar fine tuned the script until April 2017. Though the film was initially named Rangasthalam 1985, it was later rechristened to Rangasthalam. The film was produced on a budget of ₹60 crore (US$6.2 million).

=== Casting ===
Sukumar met Ram Charan through a common friend Ranga during the filming of Nannaku Prematho and got his approval for the script. Charan played Chittibabu, a "partially hearing impaired innocent guy" whose disorder was used to convey all the emotions the character goes through. He sported a bearded look in the film and underplayed the character to make it feel real. Charan also had to master the accent spoken in the Godavari regions, and struggled to match the villagers' speed. Charan was styled by his sister Sushmita Konidela, who had to source fabrics with typical prints that were used in the 1980s. She also had to refer the looks sported by their father, actor Chiranjeevi in his earlier films.

A screen test was conducted on Anupama in January 2017 before selecting her as the female lead, though Samantha was finalised later for the same. She played Ramalakshmi, a "typical village belle", and her lines were dubbed by Jyothi Varma. Most of Samantha's portions were filmed during the early mornings and late hours, as she did not like to work in the noon. In an interview with Firstpost, she said that everything about her role in the film was on a different tangent, and that she initially struggled to adjust with the rural environment, as she grew up in the urban areas of Chennai. To prepare for her role, she observed and spent some time with the women in the villages near Rajamahendravaram, and took inputs from Sukumar who wanted her portrayal of Ramalakshmi seem unrestrained.

Jagapathi Babu was cast as the antagonist; his inclusion was confirmed by the film's crew in January 2017. He played the role of the village head who speaks less and conveys more through his eyes, gestures and body language. Aadhi Pinisetty was cast as the protagonist's brother Kumar Babu, whom Sukumar described as the "personification of the innocence of the [1980s]". Sukumar approached Pinisetty during the shoot of Ninnu Kori (2017) to cast him for the character, which the latter termed as one of his easiest portrayals. Pujita Ponnada, who made her debut with Sukumar's production Darsakudu (2017), was cast as Pinisetty's love interest in the film.

Television presenter Anasuya Bharadwaj was cast as Rangammatha, a 28-year-old woman with a mindset of the 1990s. Sukumar cast her after she successfully auditioned for the role, adding that she had a "divine face". For the role, she sported no makeup and instead opted for a turmeric-smeared look. Prakash Raj and Brahmaji were cast in supporting roles; the latter played the role of a Tehsildar. Some of Brahmaji's portions in the film were edited out due to excessive length. In October 2017, Pooja Hegde was signed to perform an item number song "Jigelu Rani" in the film.

=== Filming ===
Rangasthalam was majorly filmed in a village set worth ₹50 million (US$520,000) erected in Hyderabad, with only ten percent of the footage shot in real locations. 400 people worked on the village set for two months. The props were procured from a few antique shops in Rajamahendravaram and from the old buildings in the nearby villages. Sukumar and Rathnavelu wanted to shoot the film in harsh sunlight, planning to complete by July 2017: "In April and May, the river appears dry and sand looks burnt. People haven't seen Godavari in this angle, in an angry mood. The same river looks different, romantic if the treatment is different." Rangasthalam is one of the first few Indian films to be entirely shot using Red Helium 8K cameras; it was chosen for its "great dynamic range" and for filming sequences under extremely low light conditions. A gimbal was used to support 90% of the film's shoot as the script was conversation-based and involved multiple actors. Rathnavelu also opted to shoot longer takes to capture sequences in real time without being "intrusive".

Principal photography commenced in April 2017; Charan and Samantha joined the film's sets at Rajamahendravaram where a song on the duo was filmed. The first schedule was wrapped on 27 April 2017, in which scenes featuring Charan, Samantha and Pinisetty were filmed. Unable to bear the heat, Samantha fainted on the sets, which resulted in the first schedule being wrapped up a day in advance. Filming was postponed further by a month, concerned with the rising temperatures in the Godavari belt. The film's crew left for Hyderabad in mid-May 2017, where Prakash Raj joined the sets. By the end of June 2017, two major schedules were wrapped up and filming continued near the Papikonda National Park. Some filming locations, scheduled to be submerged under the Polavaram Project, were either deserted or had limited inhabitation. Due to lack of proper communication and facilities, the equipment and the crew traveled in boats to Rajamahendravaram everyday post wrapping the day's shoot.

In mid-July 2017, the construction of the village set was completed and principal photography resumed at Hyderabad. Key scenes on the film's principal cast were filmed in a 35-day schedule. Due to the rains, M90 Lights were used to bring the harsh burnt-out look. As the grass turned green, Ramakrishna replaced the soil and planted dry grass to maintain the initially planned colour palette. A song on Charan and majority of the supporting cast was filmed in October 2017, which was choreographed by Shobhi. In November 2017, a key action sequence featuring Charan and other supporting actors was shot in a village fair set. By then, majority of the principal photography was wrapped up.

The final schedule commenced in mid-January 2018 near Rajamahendravaram. A song, choreographed by Prem Rakshith, was filmed on Charan and Samantha on the banks of the Godavari river in the beginning of the schedule. Samantha completed filming for her portions in February 2018. The item number "Jigelu Rani" featuring Pooja Hegde and choreographed by Jani Master was filmed in a set erected at a private studio in Hyderabad. In March 2018, Charan completed filming for his portions, and the principal photography was wrapped.

== Themes and influence ==
Sukumar drew inspiration from the lives of people he knew personally, and incorporated the themes of a corrupt co-operative society controlled by few influential men in the village, and that of young men leaving for the Persian Gulf region to secure employment. Phanindra Bhupathi, being the most powerful man in the village, is shown at least 4–5 feet above everyone else. His house is built on a pedestal, signifying his authority over others. Priyanka Sundar, writing for Hindustan Times, noted that the film focuses on the theme of good versus evil, by making the antagonist display signs of god complex.

Film critic Baradwaj Rangan noted that Rangasthalam exists in the feudal realm of Shyam Benegal's Ankur (1974) and Nishant (1975), and Bapu's Mana Voori Pandavulu (1978). He added that the film is both political and personal drama, with a "morally uplifting social uprising" and "carefully nurtured vigilante justice". Sankeertana Varma, writing for Film Companion, called Rangasthalam an upgraded version of Mana Voori Pandavulu set in a "village where caste is everywhere".

Film critic Karthik Keramalu noted that Rangasthalam explores the themes of caste-based honour killings and so called brahminical patriarchy through Dakshina Murthy's character, a soft-spoken politician. Sukumar added that he was also inspired from the ethics followed while implementing capital punishment, where the officials would wait until the person recovers from illness and is healthy.

== Music ==
Devi Sri Prasad composed the film's soundtrack and score. The former consists of six songs, all written by Chandrabose. Chandrabose wrote the lyrics at Puducherry after holding discussions with Sukumar and Prasad. He completed writing five songs out of six in four days, with each one taking half an hour to complete. The tunes were composed after Chandrabose completed writing the lyrics.

The first single "Yentha Sakkagunnave", sung by Prasad himself, was released by Lahari Music on 13 February 2018. Two other tracks, "Ranga Ranga Rangasthalana" and "Rangamma Mangamma", were released on 2 and 8 March 2018 respectively. "Jigelu Rani" was released on 15 March 2018 and Lahari Music released the soundtrack on 15 March 2018 in YouTube and all other digital platforms. The initial release contained only five tracks; the sixth one was excluded as it contained spoilers about the film's plot.

The sixth track, titled "Orayyo", was a song used in the score for the scenes depicting Kumar Babu's funeral in the film. Sung by Chandrabose himself, "Orayyo" was released on 3 April 2018. The soundtrack received positive reviews from the critics, who were appreciative of the lyrics and Prasad's instrumentation in tune with the film's periodic setting.

== Release ==
=== Theatrical ===
In December 2017, the makers announced that Rangasthalam would release globally on 30 March 2018. The global theatrical rights were sold for ₹80 crore (US$8.3 million), and the film was scheduled to release in 1200 screens. Rangasthalam was released across 600 screens in Andhra Pradesh and Telangana, 200 screens in the rest of India, and 350 screens in the overseas markets. In April 2018, the makers announced that the film would be dubbed into Tamil, Malayalam, Bhojpuri and Hindi languages with the same name. In March 2019, a Kannada-dubbed version of the film titled Rangasthala was announced, making Rangasthalam the second Telugu film after Mayabazar (1957) to have a dubbed release in Karnataka. It was released in 150 screens on 12 July 2019. The film's Tamil dubbed version was later released on 30 April 2021. The film's Hindi dubbed version was skipped theatrical release and directly premiered on television in 2025.

=== Home media ===
Star Maa purchased the satellite rights. The film registered a TRP rating of 19.5 on its television premiere. Amazon Prime Video acquired the film's digital rights, and made it available online on 12 May 2018.Its Hindi dubbed version was premiered on Goldmines TV channel on 24 August 2025.

== Reception ==
=== Box office ===
Rangasthalam opened to a 100% occupancy in some areas of India, including districts of Telangana and Andhra Pradesh, earning ₹43.8 crore (US$4.5 million) globally. At the United States box office, the film debuted with earnings of US$640,000 from its premieres in 160 locations, and of US$1,204,578 in two days. The film benefited from the then ongoing strike in Tamil Nadu against digital service providers, and earned ₹1.01 crore (US$100,000) in its first weekend at Chennai. Rangasthalam grossed ₹90.5 crore (US$9.4 million) globally, with a distributor share of ₹56.96 crore (US$5.9 million) in its first weekend. Rangasthalam's earnings exceeded US$2 million on its third day of theatrical release in the US, becoming the ninth Indian Telugu-language film to do so.

By the end of its first week, the film grossed ₹127.1 crore (US$13 million) and a distributor share of ₹79.89 crore (US$8.3 million), achieving break-even. After earning more than US$3 million in 9 days in the US, Rangasthalam became the all-time third highest grossing Telugu film in that country. In 31 days, it had grossed a worldwide total of ₹200 crore (US$21 million) and a distributor share of ₹117 crore (US$12 million), becoming the third-highest grossing Telugu film of all time. In 33 days, the film crossed US$3.5 million mark in the US. In its complete global theatrical run, Rangasthalam grossed a total of ₹216 crore (US$22 million) and earned a distributor share of ₹123.6 crore (US$13 million), becoming the highest grossing Telugu film of that year.

=== Critical response ===
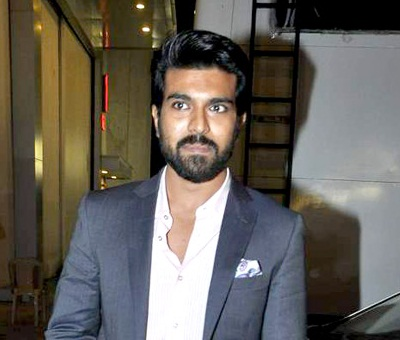
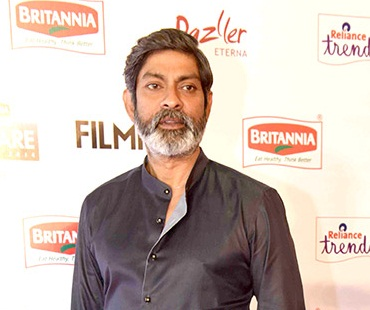
The performances of Charan and Babu were praised by critics.

Rangasthalam received positive reviews from the critics who were particularly appreciative of Sukumar's writing and the performances of the ensemble cast; they were critical of the film's slow pace and runtime nearing three hours. On the review aggregator website Rotten Tomatoes, 100% of 7 critics' reviews are positive, with an average rating of 7.4/10.

Baradwaj Rangan called Rangasthalam an "unusual masala movie" whose punch moments "arise organically from the screenplay" which aren't just "a shot or a line set up simply to get the pulse pounding at regular intervals". Rangan added that Sukumar "works with a larger vision", and "leaves behind his fingerprints" in what he called the "most hodgepodge of genres". Subhash K. Jha, in his review for the Indo-Asian News Service, called Rangasthalam a film "from the heart" and wrote that it "plays itself out with a karmic velocity giving the main characters a chance to grow without revelling in their dazzle [sic]". Jha praised the performances of Charan and Babu, in particular, adding that the former "remains almost flawlessly in character," which was "diffident and disarmingly disingenuous, valiant but not fearless".

Sangeetha Devi Dundoo, in her review for The Hindu, likened Rangasthalam to a novel: "In its first few pages, this fictitious dusty village of the [1980s] reveals itself gradually. The dialect is rooted, not a generic one that mainstream films present in a broad brushstroke for instant appeal." Dundoo opined that it was the most defining film for both Sukumar and Charan, adding that it marked the latter's rise as an actor. Neeshita Nyayapati of The Times of India called Charan's performance "stupendous"; she wrote, "Be it in the scenes where he oozes childishness or the ones when you see a broken man that no one can heal, you can see it all in the way his eyes emote." Manoj Kumar R, reviewing for The Indian Express, called Rangasthalam a "well-crafted canvas" which was made with "honesty and high regard for the audience". He found Babu's portrayal of the village's president "convincing".

Hemanth Kumar was particularly appreciative of Sukumar's writing in his review for Firstpost. He wrote, "To narrate a political drama is one thing, but to create such an universe within the parameters of a revenge drama is sheer brilliance. The more you dig into Rangasthalam, the more rewarding it is." Kumar called the climax "explosive" and remarked, "Adjectives don’t do enough justice to what [the film] manages to achieve in the end." Murali Krishna CH of The New Indian Express too praised the climax, stating that Sukumar "weaves his magic wand" towards the end with an "interesting" twist. However, he was critical of the film's narrative, opining that it "lingers too long" in certain sequences, which made them look staged. Calling the film a "well designed mass entertainer" with a "clearly and adamantly rural" narrative, K Naresh Kumar of The Hans India wrote, "As the disunited denizens slowly unite under the saviour, the story takes its interesting twists and turns with a very gripping climax to elevate the film altogether." In contrast, Nagarjuna Rao, in his review for Gulf News, found Rangasthalam a "gripping" tale with a "predictable" end. He called Babu's performance "domineering" and added that the film "could well be" Charan's career best. Similarly, Latha Srinivasan opined that the climax was "a bit of a let-down". In her review for NewsX, she felt that the ending "could have been better written" to "pack a punch rather than just add a twist".

Krishna Sripada was critical of the climax as well. Reviewing the film for The News Minute, he wrote, "Rangasthalam gives you likable characters in a screenplay that aims to touch dizzying heights without packing enough fuel. A story that makes you wait and wait should offer more when it eventually comes to a close." Priyanka Sundar called Prakash Raj the film's game changer towards the end. Sunder wrote that Raj stuns the viewers in the scene "because of the way all of it is presented". Sify, in its review, noted that the film holds the viewers' attention till the end despite the lengthy runtime and slow pace. It praised the performances of the ensemble cast, the cinematography, and the music but was critical of the film's plot for lacking novelty. Suresh Kavirayani of Deccan Chronicle too opined that Rangasthalam had a regular storyline but was presented by Sukumar in a unique way. Film Companion while compiling the 25 Greatest Telugu Films of the Decade, called this movie as an updated version of Mana Voori Pandavulu (1978). Nagarjuna Rao of Gulf News gave the film 3.5 stars out of 5 and stated, "There comes a career best for all actors at some point of time. Rangasthalam could well be Ram Charan’s, though he’s not been in the showbiz for too long, and there’s still a long innings ahead of him. Rangasthalam may not set the cash registers ring like some of Charan’s successful movies — and he’s had a few failures, too — but the film will remain as one of his best."

== Accolades ==
At the 66th National Film Awards, the film won the Best Audiography. It won ten awards at Zee Cine Awards Telugu. The film won many awards at Filmfare Awards South and South Indian International Movie Awards.
