= List of awards and nominations received by Devi Sri Prasad =

Devi Sri Prasad awards and nominations
Awards and nominations
Award	Wins	Nominations
CineMAA Awards	8	0
Filmfare Awards South	10	12
GAMA	7	0
Hyderabad Times Film Awards	1	0
IIFA Utsavam	2	2
International Tamil Film Awards	1	0
Maa Music Awards	2	0
Mirchi Music Awards South	9	9
Nandi Awards	1	0
Radio City Cine Awards	0	4
Sakshi Excellence Awards	3	0
Santosham Film Awards	9	0
SIIMA	8	12
South Scope Lifestyle Awards	2	0
TSR– TV9 National Film Awards	3	0
Vijay Awards	0	1
Vijay Music Awards	1	0
Zee Cine Awards Telugu	1	1
Other Awards	7	1

Totals (Note: Certain award groups do not simply award one winner. They acknowledge several different recipients, have runners-up, and have third place. Since this is a specific recognition and is different from losing an award, runner-up mentions are considered wins in this award tally. For simplification and to avoid errors, each award in this list has been presumed to have had a prior nomination.)
- Wins: 75
- Nominations: 35

Devi Sri Prasad is an Indian composer, lyricist, singer-songwriter, and performer. He has provided musical scores predominantly for Telugu films apart from a few films in other Indian languages. Although his earlier soundtrack albums received wide response, his compositions in the 2004 Telugu film Varsham fetched him awards for the first time in his career.

Apart from soundtrack composition, he also received awards for film scoring, playback singing and lyrics composition. He performed in various music concerts. His 2012 release Gabbar Singh, received huge response both from audience and critics. Devi received several awards for the soundtrack album. "Kevvu Keka" song from the album received cult status over the years. In 2021, the album is honored with Album of the Decade award at 11th Mirchi Music Awards South.

He is a recipient of a National Film Award, eleven Filmfare Awards, eight SIIMA Awards, five CineMAA Awards, and one Nandi Award.

== National Film Awards ==
Year	Nominated work	Category	Result	Ref.
2021	Pushpa: The Rise	Best Music Direction	Won	

== Filmfare Awards South ==
Year	Nominated work	Category	Result	Ref.
2005	Varsham	Best Music Director – Telugu	Won	
2005	Arya	Best Music Director – Telugu	Nominated	
2006	Nuvvostanante Nenoddantana	Best Music Director – Telugu	Won	
2006	Nuvvostanante Nenoddantana	Filmfare Special Award – South	Won	
2007	Bommarillu	Best Music Director – Telugu	Won	
2009	Jalsa	Best Music Director – Telugu	Nominated	
2010	Arya 2	Best Music Director – Telugu	Nominated	
2010	Kanthaswamy	Best Music Director – Tamil	Nominated	
2010	Villu	Best Music Director – Tamil	Nominated	
2011	Adhurs	Best Music Director – Telugu	Nominated	
2012	100% Love	Best Music Director – Telugu	Nominated	
2013	Gabbar Singh	Best Music Director – Telugu	Won	
2014	Attarintiki Daredi	Best Music Director – Telugu	Won	
2014	Mirchi	Best Music Director – Telugu	Nominated	
2015	Yevadu	Best Music Director – Telugu	Nominated	
2016	Srimanthudu	Best Music Director – Telugu	Won	
2017	Nannaku Prematho	Best Music Director – Telugu	Won	
2018	Duvvada Jagannadham	Best Music Director – Telugu	Nominated	
2018	Khaidi No. 150	Best Music Director – Telugu	Nominated	
2019	Rangasthalam	Best Music Director – Telugu	Won	
2021	Pushpa: The Rise	Best Music Director – Telugu	Won	
2024	Waltair Veerayya	Best Music Director – Telugu	Nominated	
2025	Pushpa 2: The Rule	Best Music Director – Telugu	Won	

== CineMAA Awards ==
Year	Nominated work	Category	Result	Ref.
2005	Varsham	Best Music Director	Won	
2007	Bommarillu	Best Music Director	Won	
2010	Arya 2	Best Music Director	Won	
2013	Gabbar Singh	Best Music Director	Won	
2015	1: Nenokkadine	Special Music Award	Won	
2016	Srimanthudu	Best Music Director	Won	
2016	S/O Satyamurthy	Best Music Director	Won	
2016	Kumari 21F	Best Music Director	Won	

== Gulf Andhra Music Awards (GAMA Tollywood Awards) ==
Year	Nominated work	Category	Result	Ref.
2014	Attarintiki Daredi	Best Music Director	Won	
2014	Attarintiki Daredi	Best Background Score	Won	
2015	Legend	Best Background Score	Won	
2015	"Legend" from Legend	Best Title Song	Won	
2015	"Ayyo Papam" from Yevadu	Best Item Song	Won	
2016	"Super Machi" from S/O Satyamurthy (along with Sravana Bhargavi)	Best Commercial Song	Won	
2016	Srimanthudu	Best Music Director	Won	

== Hyderabad Times Film Awards ==
Year	Nominated work	Category	Result	Ref.
2013	Gabbar Singh	Best Music Director	Won	

== IIFA Utsavam ==
Year	Nominated work	Category	Result	Ref.
2016	Srimanthudu	Best Music Director	Won	
2016	"Super Machi" from S/O Satyamurthy	Best Lyricist	Nominated	
2017	Janatha Garage	Best Music Director	Won	
2017	Sardaar Gabbar Singh	Best Music Director	Nominated	

== International Tamil Film Awards ==
Year	Nominated work	Category	Result	Ref.
2012	Venghai	Best Music Director	Won	

== Maa Music Awards ==
Year	Nominated work	Category	Result	Ref.
2012	Gabbar Singh	Most Popular Music Director	Won	
2012	"Kevvu Keka" from Gabbar Singh	Best Item Song	Won	

== Mirchi Music Awards South ==
Year	Nominated work	Category	Result	Ref.
2010	"Ringa Ringa" from Arya 2	Song of the Year – Jury Choice	Won	
2010	Arya 2	Album of the Year – Jury Choice	Won	
2013	Gabbar Singh	Album of the Year – Jury Choice	Won	
2013	Gabbar Singh	Album of the Year – Listeners' Choice	Won	
2013	"Akasam Ammayaithe" from Gabbar Singh	Song of the Year – Jury Choice	Won	
2013	"Kevvu Keka" from Gabbar Singh	Song of the Year – Listeners' Choice	Won	
2013	Gabbar Singh	Music Composer of the Year	Nominated	
2015	"Who R U?" from 1: Nenokkadine	Male Vocalist of the Year	Nominated	
2015	1: Nenokkadine	Album of the Year – Jury Choice	Nominated	
2016	S/O Satyamurthy	Album of the Year – Listeners' Choice	Won	
2016	"Super Machi" from S/O Satyamurthy	Song of the Year – Listeners' Choice	Won	
2021	Attarintiki Daredi	Album of the Decade – Listeners' Choice	Won	
2021	Gabbar Singh	Album of the Decade – Listeners' Choice	Nominated	
2021	S/O Satyamurthy	Album of the Decade – Listeners' Choice	Nominated	
2021	Attarintiki Daredi	Album of the Decade – Jury Choice	Nominated	
2021	Gabbar Singh	Album of the Decade – Jury Choice	Nominated	
2021	"Super Machi" from S/O Satyamurthy	Song of the Decade – Listeners' Choice	Nominated	
2021	"Aaradugula Bullettu" from Attarintiki Daredi	Music Composer of the Decade	Nominated	

== Nandi Awards ==
Year	Nominated work	Category	Result	Ref.
2013	Attarintiki Daredi	Best Music Director	Won	

== Radio City Cine Awards ==
Year	Nominated work	Category	Result	Ref.
2018	Khaidi No. 150	Best Music Director	Nominated	
2019	Rangasthalam	Best Music Director	Nominated	
2019	Rangasthalam	Best Background Score	Nominated	
2019	"Yentha Sakkagunnave" from Rangasthalam	Best Male Singer	Nominated	

== Sakshi Excellence Awards ==
Year	Nominated work	Category	Result	Ref.
2015	Srimanthudu	Most Popular Music Director of the Year	Won	
2015	S/O Satyamurthy	Most Popular Music Director of the Year	Won	
2015	Kumari 21F	Most Popular Music Director of the Year	Won	
2016	Nannaku Prematho	Most Popular Music Director of the Year	Won	
2019	Rangasthalam	Most Popular Music Director of the Year	Won	

== Santosham Film Awards ==
Year	Nominated work	Category	Result	Ref.
2005	Varsham	Best Music Director	Won	
2006	Nuvvostanante Nenoddantana	Best Music Director	Won	
2007	Bommarillu	Best Music Director	Won	
2009	Jalsa	Best Music Director	Won	
2013	Gabbar Singh	Best Music Director	Won	
2014	Attarintiki Daredi	Best Music Director	Won	
2015	1: Nenokkadine	BigFM Music Award	Won	
2016	Srimanthudu	Best Music Director	Won	
2022	Pushpa: The Rise	Best Music Director	Won	

== South Indian International Movie Awards ==
Year	Nominated work	Category	Result	Ref.
2012	100% Love	Best Music Director – Telugu	Nominated	
2013	Gabbar Singh	Best Music Director – Telugu	Won	
2014	Attarintiki Daredi	Best Music Director – Telugu	Won	
2015	1: Nenokkadine	Best Music Director – Telugu	Nominated	
2016	Srimanthudu	Best Music Director – Telugu	Won	
2017	Janatha Garage	Best Music Director – Telugu	Won	
2017	Nannaku Prematho	Best Male Playback Singer – Telugu	Nominated	
2018	Khaidi No. 150	Best Music Director – Telugu	Nominated	
2018	Khaidi No. 150	Best Male Playback Singer – Telugu	Nominated	
2019	Rangasthalam	Best Music Director – Telugu	Won	
2021	Maharshi	Best Music Director – Telugu	Won	
2021	Sarileru Neekevvaru	Best Music Director – Telugu	Nominated	
2021	Sarileru Neekevvaru	Best Lyricist – Telugu	Nominated	
2022	Pushpa: The Rise	Best Music Director – Telugu	Won	
2025	Pushpa 2: The Rule	Best Music Director – Telugu	Won	

== South Scope Lifestyle Awards ==
Year	Nominated work	Category	Result	Ref.
2009	Jalsa	Best Music Director	Won	
2010	Arya 2	Best Music Director	Won	

== TSR– TV9 National Film Awards ==
Year	Nominated work	Category	Result	Ref.
2015	Damarukam	Best Music Director	Won	
2015	Attarintiki Daredi	Best Music Director	Won	
2017	S/O Satyamurthy	Best Music Director	Won	

== Vijay Awards ==
Year	Nominated work	Category	Result	Ref.
2010	Kanthaswamy	Best Music Director	Nominated	

== Vijay Music Awards ==
Year	Nominated work	Category	Result	Ref.
2011	"Kadhal Vandale" from Singam	Popular Song of The Masses	Won	

== Zee Cine Awards Telugu ==
Year	Nominated work	Category	Result	Ref.
2019	Rangasthalam	Best Music Director	Won	
2020	F2: Fun and Frustration	Best Album of the Year	Nominated	

== Other Awards and recognitions ==
- 2009: Sitara Awards – Special Award for Best Music Director (for Jalsa and Ready)
- 2009: Isai Aruvi Tamil Music Awards – Best Music Director (for Kanthaswamy)
- 2013: Audi Ritz Icon Awards
- 2013: Big Telugu Entertainment Awards – Best Music Director (for Attarintiki Daredi)
- 2016: Sri Kala Sudha Telugu Association 18th Ugadi Purakaskaralu – Best Music Director
- 2017: Zee Golden Awards – Best Music Director (for Khaidi No. 150 and DJ: Duvvada Jagannadham)
- 2017: Nominated for Best Music Director (for Khaidi No. 150, Jai Lava Kusa and DJ: Duvvada Jagannadham) at Mango Telugu Cinema Awards 2017
