= DJ: Duvvada Jagannadham (soundtrack) =

2017 film score by Devi Sri Prasad

Soundtrack album by Devi Sri Prasad
- Released: 21 May 2017
- Recorded: 2017
- Genre: Feature film soundtrack
- Length: 20:47
- Language: Telugu
- Label: Aditya Music
- Producer: Devi Sri Prasad

Devi Sri Prasad chronology
Rarandoi Veduka Chudham (2017)	DJ: Duvvada Jagannadham (2017)	Jaya Janaki Nayaka (2017)
External audio
- Audio Jukebox on YouTube

Singles from DJ: Duvvada Jagannadham
- 1. "DJ Saranam Bhaje Bhaje" Released: 3 May 2017; 2. "Gudilo Badilo Madilo Vodilo" Released: 17 May 2017

DJ: Duvvada Jagannadham is the soundtrack album composed by Devi Sri Prasad for the 2017 Tollywood film of the same name written and directed by Harish Shankar and produced by Dil Raju under his banner Sri Venkateswara Creations. The album consists of five tracks with Jonnavittula Ramalingeswara Rao, Sri Mani, Bhaskarabhatla, Sahithi and Balaji penning the lyrics. The soundtrack album released digitally on 21 May 2017 under Aditya Music label. The film stars Allu Arjun and Pooja Hegde in the lead roles, while Rao Ramesh, Subbaraju, Chandra Mohan, and Murali Sharma play supporting roles.

== Development ==
The film's music is composed by Devi Sri Prasad, who is collaborating with Harish Shankar for the second time and with Allu Arjun for the seventh time. The music composition was started in February 2017, which Prasad delivered two songs for Harish, which he composed within 20 hours. "Gudilo Badilo Madilo Vodilo" was shot in the various locations in United Arab Emirates, especially in Abu Dhabi and Dubai. The song "Seeti Maar" was re-composed and re-mixed by Devi Sri Prasad for the soundtrack of 2021 Hindi film Radhe.

== Release ==
On 3 May 2017, the first single of the film "DJ Saranam Bhaje Bhaje" was released through the YouTube channel of Aditya Music, the music label which bought the film's audio rights. The promo of the song "Gudilo Badilo Madilo Vodilo" was unveiled on 15 May, and two days later, on 17 May 2017, the full song was released and got wide reception. The film's audio was released on 21 May 2017, at Shilpakala Vedika in Hyderabad.

== Tracklisting ==
=== Telugu ===
Original Motion Picture Tracklist
No.	Title	Lyrics	Singer(s)	Length
1.	"DJ Saranam Bhaje Bhaje"	Jonnavittula Ramalingeswara Rao	Vijay Prakash, Chorus	04:20
2.	"Gudilo Badilo Madilo Vodilo/Asmaika"	Sahithi	K. S. Chitra, M. L. R. Karthikeyan	04:24
3.	"Mecchuko"	Sri Mani	Nakash Aziz	04:20
4.	"Seeti Maar"	Balaji	Jaspreet Jasz, Rita	04:10
5.	"Box Baddhalai Poyi"	Bhaskarabhatla Ravi Kumar	Sagar, Geetha Madhuri	03:33
Total length:				20:47

=== Malayalam ===
All lyrics are written by Siju Thuravoor.

No.	Title	Singer(s)	Length
1.	"DJ Saranam Bhaje Bhaje"	Anwar Sadath	04:20
2.	"Mayilo Kuyilo"	Madhu Balakrishnan, Rajalakshmi Abhiram	04:24
3.	"Tappo Tappo Nenjil Thatti"	Vidhu Prathap	04:16
4.	"Seeti Maar"	Vipin Xavior, Ranjini Jose	03:59
5.	"Minna Minnipole"	Vidhu Prathap, Durga Viswanath	03:33
Total length:			20:32

== Reception ==
=== Audience Response ===
The music album got wide response. "Gudilo Badilo Madilo Vodilo" and "Seeti Maar" are the biggest hits of the album.

The promo of the song "Seeti Maar" was unveiled on 21 June, and after it received positive reception, the full video song was released as a music video on 22 August 2017. Dance choreography in "Seeti Maar" by Sekhar got huge reception which is performed by Allu Arjun and Pooja Hegde. As of April 2021, the song crossed 200 million views in YouTube.

=== Reviews ===
A. Kameshwari of Indian Express wrote that "Allu Arjun’s films are more than just a theatre experience. For his fans, his films are a reason to celebrate because they are a true blend of what is known as Tollywood masala. Now, the fans are patiently waiting for his upcoming film DJ-Duvvada Jagannadham. However, before the release, the makers of the film have treated fans with its jukebox. Over the years, the one thing Tollywood fans are assured about is the fact that when Allu Arjun and Devi Sri Prasad a.k.a. DSP, come together the album has to be something that will simply blow your mind, and DJ-Duvvada Jaggannadham’s jukebox stands up to all kinds of expectations Allu Arjun’s fans must have had from the hit duo."

123Telugu stated about the album that "One can easily say that DJ is definitely not a better album than Allu Arjun’s previous audio Sarrainodu. Having said that, Devi Sri Prasad makes sure that he gives some hit songs which suit every situation in the film. There is something for everyone and DSP’s tracks will grow on you slowly. Badilo Vadilo, Box Baddalaipoye and Mecchuko are our picks and will be even bigger hits once the film releases." Another reviewer from Idlebrain.com wrote that "Music by Devi Sri Prasad is good and my favorite song on screen is Asmaika. Mass songs (Box Baddalaipoddi and Seeti Maar) were also pictured well."

Shekhar H Hooli of International Business Times stated "The songs of DJ a.k.a. Duvvada Jagannadham starring Allu Arjun and Pooja Hegde, has received superb response from audience, who say all the tracks are set to be chartbusters. DJ a.k.a. Duvvada Jagannadham has five songs and Devi Sri Prasad has composed music for the movie. Aditya Music, who holds its audio rights, released the videos of couple songs last week and received a wonderful response with the views count crossing 10 million in couple of days. They also unleashed the teaser of the music video of one of the songs, which was also superhit."

=== Controversy ===
The brahmin community in Telangana filed a complaint against the makers of the film, as the lyrics of the song "Gudilo Badilo Madilo Vodilo" allegedly showcased them in a bad way, also seeking a ban on the movie.

== Album credits ==
Credits adapted from Aditya Music

=== Producer(s) ===
Devi Sri Prasad

=== Songwriter(s) ===
- Devi Sri Prasad (Composer, Arranger)
- Jonnavittula Ramalingeswara Rao, Sri Mani, Bhaskarabhatla, Sahithi, Balaji, Siju Thuravoor (lyrics)

=== Performer(s) ===
Vijay Prakash, K. S. Chithra, M. L. R. Karthikeyan, Nakash Aziz, Jaspreet Jasz, Sagar, Geetha Madhuri, Ranjini Jose, Madhu Balakrishnan, Vidhu Pratap, Vipin Xavior, Durga Viswanath, Rajyalakshmi Abhiram

=== Musician credits ===
- Keyboards – Vikas Badisa, Kalyan
- Guitar – Devi Sri Prasad, Babu
- Banjo – Devi Sri Prasad
- Konnakol – Kalyan
- Dilruba – Saroja
- Trumpet and Trombone – Babu
- Shehnai – Ballesh
- Harmony – Sujatha, Bhargavi, Nincy, Deepak, Santhosh, Jithin

Music label - Aditya Music Pvt. Ltd.

== Awards and nominations ==
Award	Category	Recipient	Result	Notes
65th Filmfare Awards South	Best Music Director	Devi Sri Prasad	Nominated	
Radio City Cine Awards Telugu	Best Female Playback Singer	K. S. Chitra for "Gudilo Badilo Madilo Vodilo"	Nominated	
