= Ranjini Jose =

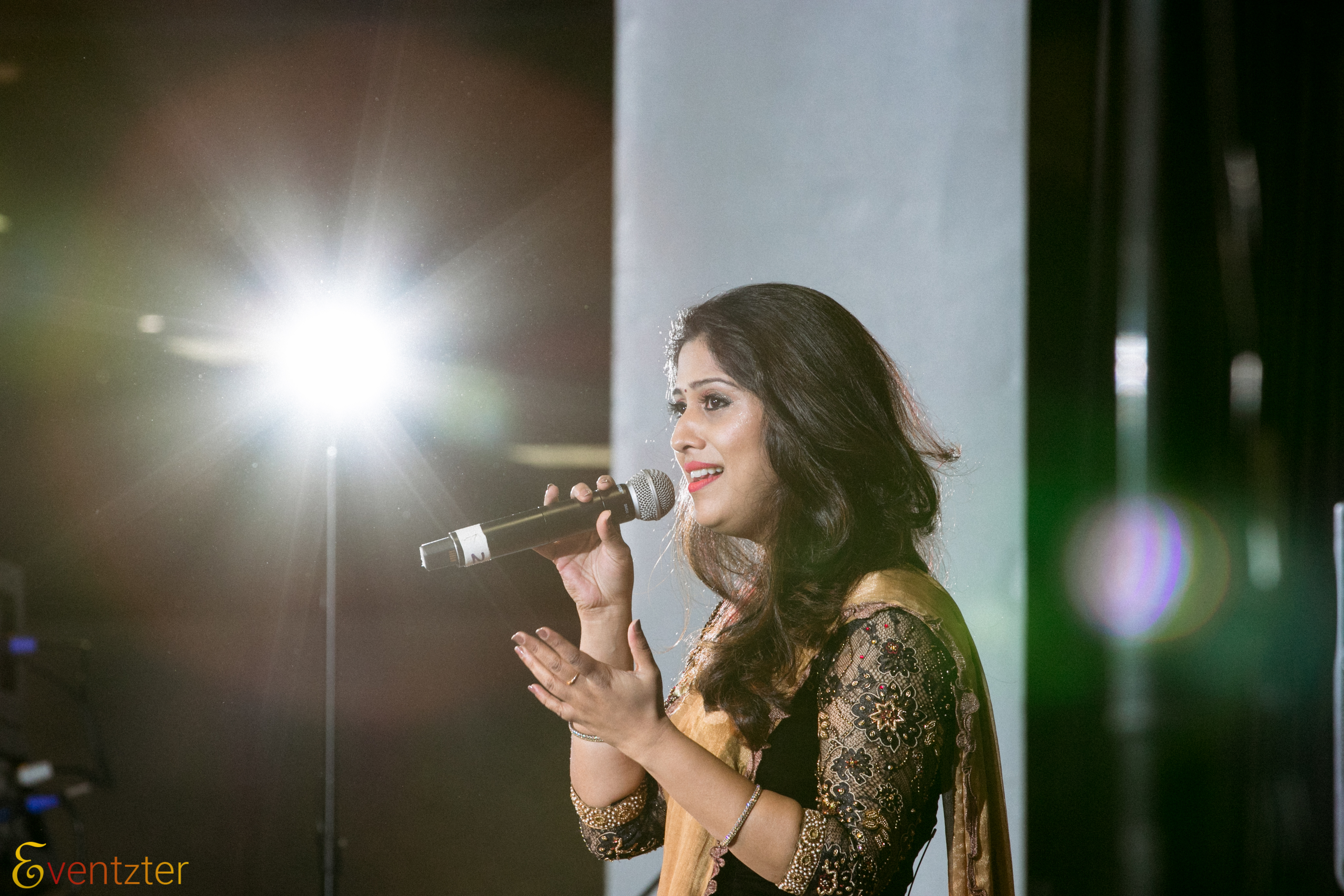

Background information
- Born: Ranjini Jose; 4 April 1984 (age 42); Nungambakkam, Chennai district, Tamil Nadu, India
- Genres: Playback singing
- Occupation: Playback singer
- Years active: 2000–present

Ranjini Jose (born 4 April 1984) is an Indian playback singer, lending her voice to several songs in Malayalam, Tamil, Telugu, Kannada and Hindi languages. In a career spanning over 20 years, she has sung in over 200 films and has acted in more than a couple, including the 2017 drama Basheerinte Premalekhanam. After getting a break in the Chorus Peters Chochin Chorus Troupe in 1998, she made her Playback singing debut in the Malayalam cinema Melevaryathe Malakhakkuttikal, beside K. S. Chithra.

== Life ==
Ranjini was born on 4 April 1984 in Chennai to Film producer Babu Jose and singer and bank employee C. K. Jayalakshmi. She was brought up in Chennai, moving to Kochi after a few years. Ranjini did her schooling in three different schools, Sacred Heart Church Park in Chennai, MET Public School in Perumbavoor and Bhavans Vidya Mandir, Elamakkara. She considers her school life to be the most comfortable time of her life, where she grew up listening to various musicians like Ilayaraja, S. Janaki and even international artists like ABBA, Boney M and Michael Jackson.

Raised in an artistic household, she developed a lifelong passion for the performing arts, drawing her primary encouragement from her teachers. Accompanied by her parents, Ranjini frequently, attended, film, shoots, and recording sessions, gaining valuable insight into the inner workings of the industry.

When Ranjini was in her 9th grade of school, she became a part of the famed Cochin Chorus Troupe, traveling with them and performing the song Unaru Unaru, by S. Janaki. One of her music teachers was Film fare Award-nominated lyricist Santosh Varma. When she was in 12th-grade, she was called for the recording of her first movie, Melevaryathe Malakhakkuttikal directed by Thulasidas, with music composed by Berny-Ignatius, lyrics by Ramesan Nair. She sang with the National Award-winning singer K. S. Chithra, and Santosh Kesav.

Since then, Ranjini's career took an upward leap, with her singing in over 200 movies across five languages. She made her Tamil debut with the movie Chanakya, her Hindi debut in the movie Khelein Hum Jee Jaan Sey and her Telugu debut with the song Chiru Chilake, by Sharreth, from the movie Naa Bangaaru Talli. She has also acted in three Malayalam films, the 2009 movie Red Achilles starring Mohanlal, the 2010 movie Drona starring Mammootty, and the 2017 movie Basheerinte Premalekhanam.

She has sung for and along with big artists such as Ilayaraja, M Jayachandran, Alphons, Jassie Gift, Deepak Dev, Vishal Bharadwaj, Shankar Mahadevan, and many more.\

In November 2017, Ranjini Jose founded the five-piece band Eka. A longtime dreamchild of hers, the group consists of 5 members, with Ranjini herself on vocals. They do multiple genres, such as Hindustani, Carnatic music, Folk music, Indian pop, and Rock music. They include filmy vernaculars, and also don't shy away from incorporating a few foreign languages into their music. The name of the band stands for something that Ranjini believes spiritually, – "It comes from the mantra, 'Ekam Eva advatheeyam' which says that there is only one power."

In September 2022, Ranjini performed at Campion School Auditorium, Bhopal. Bhopalites enjoyed the multi genre songs that the singer sang. She performed with her band 'Eka'

== Personal life ==
Ranjini Jose moved to Kochi from her place of birth in Chennai during high school. An only grandchild on her father's side, she used to travel to her parents' homes during vacations. She considers Michael Jackson to be one of her biggest inspirations, along with Alanis Morissette and ABBA. She considers herself lucky to have been able to start her career at the young age of 15 and now works on her band Eka. She tours extensively, performing across India, the Middle East, the United States of America and Europe.She was married to Dj Ram Nair.They got divorced in 2018.

== Partial discography ==
Year	Film/Album	Song	Music	Co-singer(s)
1999	American Ammayi	Aadhyathe		
1999	Holi	Holi Holi		
2000	Melevaryathe Malakhakkuttikal	Theyyam Kattil Thekkan Kaattil	Berny–Ignatius	K. S. Chithra, Santhosh Kesav
2000	The Judgement	Oru Kodi		
2000	Indriyam	Manjum		
2000	Rapid Action Force	Kaarmukil		
2001	Dupe Dupe Dupe	Kasthoori Maanmizhi .. Karpoora Deepangal, Poomazhayayi	Sanjeev Babu	M. G. Sreekumar
2001	Thenthulli	Sneha Pookkal	Samji Aaraattupuzha	
2001	Sravu	Ente Munnil Pookkalam	Samji Aaraattupuzha	M. G. Sreekumar
2001	Innenikku Pottukuthan	Malamolil	Sanjeev Babu	Saranya
2001	Kakki Nakshatram	Kathirola	Sanjeev Babu	M. G. Sreekumar
2001	Achaneyanenikkishtam	Aa Thathaa		M. G. Sreekumar
2001	Oannam Raagam	Ingane Onnu,Then Vasanathangal		
2001	Unnathangalil	Nakshathrangal,Manippanthalil		
2001	Bhadra	Vaarthinkalo		
2001	Noopuram	Ithu Soubhagyayaamam		
2002	Shambho Mahadeva	En manassil	Sanjeev Babu	
2002	Www.anukudumbam.com	Akkam pakkam	Sanjeev Lal	
2002	Jagathy Jagadeesh in Town	Kaalamitha ee kaliyile	Shakeer Jackson	M. G. Sreekumar
2002	Www.anukudumbam.com	Kilukilu kingini	Sajeev Raman	M. G. Sreekumar
2002	Videsi Nair Swadesi Nair	Marikkavil (F&D),Oru Thulli		
2003	Melvilasam Sariyanu	Thaazhvaaram	K. L. Sreeram	
2003	Thillaana Thillaana	Kanimullakal		
2003	Sahodaran Sahadevan	Manjakili ...		
2003	Kaliyodam	Mouna Nombara Poomizhikalil ...		
2003	Varsha	Oru Sarodinte ...,Mounam Paadum		
2003	Zameendar	Mutham Pakarum(F&D)		
2004	Greetings	Thakilu		
2004	Aparichithan	Masam Masam		
2004	Thalamelam	Pacha Mani		
2004	Youth Festival	School Daysinu		
2004	Parayam	Njan Njan Parayam,Thulli		
2004	C. I. Mahadevan 5 Adi 4 Inchu	Bolo		
2004	Students	Gangaa theeram		
2004	Aey Taxi – Kannada Dubbing Love	Margayare		
2004	Manju Peyyum Mumpe – Telugu Dubbing Ammayi Bagundi	Azhake,Thaimasa		
2004	Chekavan – Telugu Dubbing Anji	Chikku,Kannadi		
2004	Iruvar – Tamil Dubbing Iruvar	Kilimozhiye,Poonkodi,Shivangaliye		
2005	Brahmam – Telugu Dubbing Bhadra	Evidunna		
2005	Pandippada	Ponkanavu		
2005	Pauran	Mouna Nombara		
2005	Boyy Friennd	Yo Yo Payya		
2005	Ponmudipuzhayorathu	Ammayenna		
2005	Vacation	Karimbe Kadakkanni		
2005	Maanikyan	Muttathe Munthiri		
2005	Maniyarakkallan	Va Va Manmadha Raasa		
2004	Dhobiwala	Kiss kiss .		
2005	Alai Payuthey – Tamil Dubbing Alaipayuthey	Aaro		
2005	Uthrada Sandhya	Ponnazhakellam,Chinungi Chinungi		
2005	Chanakya			Tamil Debut
2006	Vrindaavanam	Ambe Jaya ...		
2006	Colourful	Paattu paadumo poonkuruvi ...		
2006	Classmates	Ethra Kaalam Naam (Sathyam Collections) ...		
2006	Jayam	Mizhiyiloru Theeyaay [F] ...		
2007	Kangaroo	Aaraaree Raareeraro [F] ...		
2007	Soorya Kireedam	Oru Swapna Chirakileri		
2007	Subhadram	Nithyanandha Kari,Nee Paadum		
2007	Ayur Rekha	Neelmizhikalo (F & D)		
2007	Dubai Seenu – Telugu Dubbing Dubai Seenu	Kanya Rasi		
2008	Thulasi – Telugu Dubbing Tulasi	Oh Miya		
2008	Glamour Nagaram – Telugu Dubbing Nagaram	Aa Aa Aa Machaane ...,Iniyum Parayaathoru ...		
2008	Bad Boy – Telugu Dubbing Jagadam	Muppathiyaru,5 feet		
2008	Vikramadithya – Telugu Dubbing Vikramarkudu	Jinthatha Chikka ,Dammare Dum Dum ..		
2008	Chandu The Hot Hero – Telugu Dubbing Lakshyam	Evide		
2008	Chase – Kannada Dubbing Shri	Aaraanu Nee ...		
2008	Thamburatti – Telugu Dubbing	Melle vaanil .		
2008	Swapnangalil Haisal Mary	Daivamente,Ponnolivin	Jerson Antony	
2008	Bellaari Raja	Pankajame Chandramathiye .		
2008	Chempada	Kallurukkippoovu Kammalaninja		
2008	Kanal Kannaadi	Neela Mukil		
2008	Gopaalapuraanam	Aarum Kaanathiniyum Njaan		
2008	Maayakkaazhcha	Channam Pinnam		
2008	Thaavalam	Thaavalangalilla .		
2009	Red Chillies	Mazhapeyyanu	M Jayachandran	Reetha
2009	Red Chillies	Chendeloru vendu	M Jayachandran	Reetha, Rashmi Vijayan, Sayanora Philip
2009	Colours	Kumbari		
2009	Nammal Thammil	Siyano		
2009	King – Telugu Dubbing King	Ettu Settum,Neeyum		
2009	Kshathriyavamsam – Telugu Dubbing (Gemini 2003)	Oh Ethranaalaay ...,Dil Deewana ...		
2009	Drona Drona	Vennila ...		
2009	Chembaka Chelulla Penne	Enne Marakkaruthe,Vellambal poo nullan,He Penne		
2010	Nayakan	Swapnathin kunnatheri [ kaatte vaayo ]	Prashant Pillai	
2010	3 Char Sau Bees	Pathinezhaayaal	Jassie Gift	Jassie Gift, Baba Saigal, Pradeep Babu, Vibin, Sajin
2010	Swantham Bharya Zindabad	Sundaranaam	Kaithapram Viswanathan	
2010	Naaleyaanu Thaalimangalam	Dukham niranjoru	Jayesh Stephen	
2010	Thoovalkattu	Ninne Kandallulil		
2010	Khelein Hum Jee Jaan Sey	Naiyn Tere		Hindi Debut
2010	Game (Telugu Dubbing) Ek Niranjan	Arikil,Rock		
2010	Viswasthan	Marakkila Njaan		
2011	Collector	Rangeelare		
2011	Sankaranum Mohananum	Manassin Kavadam (F)		
2011	Koratty Pattanam Railway Gate	Mizhikalil mounamode ...		
2011	Lovely Days	Aareyo ...,Ithu Vidhiyaanu ...,Nee Maayaamohini & Varoo ...		
2011	Sri Rama Rajyam (Telugu Dubbing) Sri Rama Rajyam	Sitarama Charitam,Ramaniduvan & Devarkalikichicha		
2011	Angane Thudangi (Telugu Dubbing) Ala Modalaindi	Oh Baby		
2011	Seetha – Telugu Dubbing Ammayi Bagundi	Mridulamayi,Paaduvathenthe & Entheyoru		
2011	Yuva – Telugu Dubbing	Kannithil Kanavaayee ...,Pala Pala Kanavukal ...		
2011	100% Love- Telugu Dubbing	Thottu Thottu ...		
2011	I Love You	Manassil Puthumazha		
2012	Cinema Company	Cinema Company		
2012	Kochi	Kanavukal Viriyum		
2012	Meow Meow Karimpoocha	Kochu Kurumpaane ...		
2012	Gajapokiri – Telugu Dubbing Julai	Ey Chekkanu,Pakado		
2013	Omege.Exe	Parayumo		
2013	Gypsy	Ottayodu ...		
2013	Nadodimannan	Macha Macha ...		
2013	Ente	Chiri Chiriyo		
2013	Naa Bangaaru Talli	Chiru Chilake		Telugu Debut
2014	Mithram	Koottukkari Maina		
2014	Oru Yakshi Katha	Ormayil		
2014	Toss Toss	Oh Madhuvadhana		
2015	Friendship	Aska Piska		
2015	Mariyam Mukku	Mekkarayil		
2015	Swargathekkal Sundaram	Arike Arike		
2015	Ayal Njanalla	Ennu Kanum		
2015	Rudhramadevi (Telugu Dubbing) Rudhramadevi	Anthappurathilo Arayanna,Matha Gajame		
2015	Rebel (Telugu Dubbing) Rebel	Google		
2015	Mirchi – Telugu Dubbing Mirchi	Barbie	Devi Sri Prasad	
2015	Indian – Tamil Dubbing Indian	Two,Telephone,Kappaleri,Pachakilikal & Maaya		
2015	Bombay – Tamil Dubbing Bombay	En,Uyire,Namma,Nee,Kutti & Oru		
2016	Welcome to Central Jail	Sundaree		
2016	Yodhau (Telugu Dubbing) Sarrainodu	Private Party		
2017	Dhruvaraj Jaganath (DJ) (Telugu Dubbing) Duvvada Jagannadham	Seeti Maar	Devi Sri Prasad	
2017	Chandra (DJ) (Kannada/Tamil Dubbing) Chandra	Neelavana		
2017	Take It Easy	Aadi Paadi ...		
2017	Prethamundu Sookshikkuka	Pei Varum		
2018	2 Days	Jawani Diwani,Koumaarame ...		
2018	Lover	Adbhutham		Telugu
2019	My Great Grandfather	Grandpa		
2019	Kurukshetra – Kannada Dubbing Kurukshetra	Jumma Jumma ...		
TBA	King Fish	King Fisher Anthem – Hey Stranger		Music also
U	Pranayam	Yathrayakum,Vasantha Yamam		
U	Vellimanithaalam	Sanyaasi Kalla Sanyaasi ...		
U	Nilaamazhayil	Enthe Nin Priya [F]		
U	June	Pranaya		

== Filmography ==
=== Actress ===
Year	Film	Role	Language	Notes
2007	Falling		Malayalam	Album
2007	Falling in Love		Malayalam	Album
2008	Oj Nilave		Malayalam	Album
2008	Vedaporulakum		Malayalam	Album
2008	Red Chillies	Anna Bella	Malayalam	
2010	Drona 2010	Jyolsna	Malayalam	
2015	Celebrate Happiness	Herself	English	Video song
2016	Ana-al Haq	Herself		Video song
2017	Basheerinte Premalekhanam	Laila	Malayalam	
2020	Sayahname		Malayalam	Video song
2020	Bhagavathi		Malayalam	Video song
2020	Doore		Malayalam	Video song
2021	Samam		Malayalam	Video song

=== Television ===
Year	Title	Role	Channel	Notes
2009	Sangeetha Mahayudham	Team Captain	Surya TV	
2011	Super Star the Ultimate	Singer	Amrita TV	(in sing with playback singer round)
2012	Indian Voice 2	Host	Mazhavil Manorama	
2013–2014	Surya Singer	Host	Surya TV	
2015	Smart Show	Participant	Flowers	
2015	Alapanathinte Puthanvzazhikal	Host	Media One	
2017	Ningalkkum Aakaam Kodeeshwaran	Contestant	Asianet	
2020–present	Comedy Masters	Judge	Amrita TV	
