= Bommarillu (soundtrack) =

2006 soundtrack album by Devi Sri Prasad

Soundtrack album by Devi Sri Prasad
- Released: 21 June 2006
- Recorded: 2006
- Genres: Feature film soundtrack, Romance
- Length: 28:19
- Language: Telugu
- Label: Aditya Music
- Producer: Devi Sri Prasad

Devi Sri Prasad chronology
Pournami (2006)	Bommarillu (2006)	Unakkum Enakkum (2006)
External audio
- Audio Jukebox on YouTube

Bommarillu is the soundtrack album composed by Devi Sri Prasad for the 2006 Telugu-language film of the same name directed and co-written by Bhaskar in his directorial debut, and produced by Dil Raju under the banner Sri Venkateswara Creations. The album consists of seven tracks with Sirivennela Seetharama Sastry, Chandrabose, Andrea Jeremiah, Bhaskarabhatla Ravi Kumar, Kulasekhar and Ananta Sriram penning the lyrics. The soundtrack album released on 21 June 2006 under Aditya Music label. The film stars Siddharth, Genelia, Prakash Raj and Jayasudha.

== Production ==
=== Development ===
For the film's music and soundtrack, Raju renewed his previous association (Arya and Bhadra) with Devi Sri Prasad. Savitha Reddy rendered the voice for Genelia's character in the film. A feature of this film is Siddharth singing one of the tracks from the film.

=== Filming ===
A couple of the songs were shot in a montage, another couple in Frankfurt am Main and other places in Germany and one song each in this house set and at a temple in Kakinada.

=== Release ===
The soundtrack album was released on 21 June 2006 during a pre-release event. The album was made available for commercial use from 23 June 2006. The music rights were owned by Aditya Music label.

== Track listing ==
All music is composed by Devi Sri Prasad.

Original Motion Picture Soundtrack (Telugu)
No.	Title	Lyrics	Singer(s)	Length
1.	"We Have a Romeo"	Chandrabose, Andrea Jeremiah	Ranjith, Andrea Jeremiah	5:06
2.	"Bommani Geesthe"	Bhaskarabhatla	Gopika Poornima & Jeans Srinivas	3:54
3.	"Kaani Ippudu"	Bhaskarabhatla	Devi Sri Prasad	5:12
4.	"Laloo Darwaja"	Kulasekhar	Naveen, Murali, Priya Prakash	4:50
5.	"Nammaka Thappani"	Sirivennela Sitaramasastri	Sagar, Sumangali	4:30
6.	"Appudo Ippudo"	Anantha Sriram, Kulasekhar	Siddharth	4:02
7.	"Bommarillu (Music Bit)"
Total length:				28:19

== Score ==
Background score
No.	Title	Music	Singer	Length
1.	"Music Bit"	Devi Sri Prasad	Sumangali	0:45
Total length:				0:45

== Reception ==
The album became a chartbuster of the year among the Telugu music albums. It became one of the most sold Telugu music albums of the year. The background score got huge praise.

=== Critical reception ===
"Siddharth is one lucky actor that whatever fate his films might have faced, the songs in them have been top rate. So, with high expectations that one reaches for Bommarillu's audio. And it is also from Devi Sri Prasad, back in form and fettle. Siddharth packs lot of energy in his acting. He does so in his singing. The fun song "Appudo Ippudo" with all the right elements to back it, has Siddharth delivering it in high-pitched warble. His voice has an attractive mix of youthfulness and innocence. Full of zingy beats and lively instrumentation. You will enjoy it despite the absolute predictability. The violin rendition of the film's theme in between is very beautiful. A good one in the album. On the whole, Bommarillu reflects what life is --- fun, mediocrity and inspired moments." wrote IndiaGlitz in its music review of the album.

Idlebrain.com stated that "Music of the film is very good and background music is excellent. The scenes in the first half are so good that songs come as speed breakers to the narration. The songs in second half are excellently blended into the narration with good emotional quotient. The choreography for ‘Bommani Geeste’ song (4th in the film) is exemplary. The pathos song that comes in parts in second half is brilliant."

== Awards and nominations ==
Award	Category	Recipient	Result	Ref.
54th Filmfare Awards South	Best Music Director	Devi Sri Prasad	Won	
54th Filmfare Awards South	Best Lyricist	Bhaskarabhatla - "Bommanu Geesthe"	Nominated	
54th Filmfare Awards South	Best Male Playback Singer	Siddharth - "Apudo Ipudo"	Nominated	
54th Filmfare Awards South	Best Female Playback Singer	Gopika Poornima - "Bommanu Geesthe"	Nominated	
Santosham Film Awards	Best Lyricst	Bhaskarabhatla - "Bommanu Geesthe"	Won	
