= Gudilo Badilo Madilo Vodilo =

2017 song by K. S. Chitra and M. L. R. Karthikeyan

- Gudilo Badilo Madilo Vodilo song cover featuring actors Allu Arjun and Pooja Hegde

Single by K. S. Chitra and M. L. R. Karthikeyan

from the album DJ: Duvvada Jagannadham
- Language: Telugu
- Released: 1 June 2017 (lyrical); 30 August 2017 (full video)
- Recorded: 2017
- Studio: YRF, Mumbai; V, Chennai; Prasad Labs, Hyderabad
- Genre: Filmi; Indian pop; soft-rock
- Length: 4:24
- Label: Aditya Music
- Composer: Devi Sri Prasad
- Lyricist: Sahithi
- Producer: Devi Sri Prasad

DJ: Duvvada Jagannadham track listing
- 5 tracks: 1. "DJ Saranam Bhaje Bhaje"; 2. "Gudilo Badilo Madilo Vodilo"; 3. "Mecchuko"; 4. "Seeti Maar"; 5. "Box Baddhalai Poyi"

Music video
- "Gudilo Badilo Madilo Vodilo" on YouTube

"Gudilo Badilo Madilo Vodilo" also known as "Asmaika" is an Indian Telugu-language song composed by Devi Sri Prasad from the 2017 soundtrack album DJ: Duvvada Jagannadham of the film of the same name. The song features Allu Arjun and Pooja Hegde with vocals by K. S. Chitra and M. L. R. Karthikeyan. The song is written by Sahithi. The song's lyrical version was released on 1 June 2017, while the full video song was released on 30 August 2017 under the music label Aditya Music.

== Release ==
The promo of the song was unveiled on 29 May 2017. The lyrical was released on 1 June 2017 and after it received positive reception, the full video was released on 30 August 2017.

== Music video ==
"Gudilo Badilo Madilo Vodilo" was shot in the various locations in United Arab Emirates, especially in Abu Dhabi and Dubai.

The music video features Allu Arjun and Pooja Hegde dancing for the single. The music is choreographed by Ganesh Acharya. The full video song garned lot of views due to its choreography and picturisation.

== Reception ==
=== Audience response ===
Upon the release of the full video version of the song, it gained lots of appreciation for its music and choreography. Ganesh Acharya, who choreographed the song received lots of praise for his work for the single.

=== Critical reviews ===
123Telugu on reviewing the music of the soundtrack wrote that "The best part of the song is the melodious singing by Chitra who gives the song a vintage touch. Devi showcases his class as he nicely mixes the song with some nice western and Indian beats which make this song a chartbuster. The dance moves are already a hit and this is the best of the lot in the recent times."

The Indian Express, Movie Crow also reviewed the song.

== Chart performance ==
The single debuted and peaked on Billboard's The 10 Best Telugu Songs at No. 5. The song debuted on Popnable Charts countdown on 2017. It stayed on the chart for 16 weeks and reached the No. 9 as the best achievement.

== Other versions ==
The song was later released as a single in Malayalam as "Mayilo Kuyilo" sung by Madhu Balakrishnan and Rajalakshmi Abhiram for the film's Malayalam version.

== Controversy ==
The Brahmin community in Telangana filed a complaint against the makers of the film, as the lyrics of the song allegedly showcased them in a bad way, also seeking a ban on the film.

== Music credits ==
Credits adapted from Aditya Music.

- Devi Sri Prasad – composer, programmer, arranger
- K. S. Chitra – vocals
- M. L. R. Karthikeyan – vocals
- Sahithi – lyrics
- Shadab Rayeen – mixing, mastering [at New Edge (Mumbai)]
- Devi Sri Prasad – Banjo, Guitar
- Kalyan – Keyboards, Rhythm, Konnakol
- Vikas Badisa – Keyboards
- Dilruba – Saroja

== Accolades ==
| Award | Category | Recipient | Result | Notes |
|---|---|---|---|---|
| Radio City Cine Awards Telugu | Best Female Playback Singer | K. S. Chitra | Nominated | |
