= Seeti Maar =

2017 single by Jaspreet Jasz and Rita Thyagarajan

Single by Jaspreet Jasz and Rita Thyagarajan

from the album DJ: Duvvada Jagannadham
- Language: Telugu
- Released: 22 August 2017
- Recorded: 2017
- Genre: Indian pop; Filmi
- Length: 4:10
- Label: Aditya Music
- Composer: Devi Sri Prasad
- Lyricist: Balaji
- Producer: Devi Sri Prasad

Jaspreet Jasz and Rita Thyagarajan singles chronology
| "Sundari" (2016) | "Seeti Maar" (2017) | "Tring Tring" (2017) |

DJ: Duvvada Jagannadham track listing
- 5 tracks: 1. "DJ Saranam Bhaje Bhaje"; 2. "Gudilo Badilo Madilo Vodilo"; 3. "Mecchuko"; 4. "Seeti Maar"; 5. "Box Baddhalai Poyi"

Music video
- "Seeti Maar" on YouTube

"Seeti Maar" (transl. Blow whistle) is an Indian Telugu-language song composed by Devi Sri Prasad for the soundtrack album of the film DJ: Duvvada Jagannadham. The song features Allu Arjun and Pooja Hegde with vocals by Jaspreet Jasz and Rita Thyagarajan and lyrics by Balaji. The song was released on 22 August 2017 under the music label Aditya Music.

== Release ==
The promo of the song was unveiled on 21 June, and after it received positive reception, the full video song was released as a music video on 22 August 2017.

== Music video ==
The music video features Allu Arjun and Pooja Hegde dancing for the single. Sekhar had choreographed the dance in the music video.

== Reception ==
=== Audience response ===
As of April 2021, the song has crossed over 200 million views on YouTube.

=== Critical reception ===
123Telugu stated that "Seeti Maar is a peppy dance number which has especially been composed keeping Bunny’s (Note: Nickname for Allu Arjun) dancing capability in mind. The orchestration is very upbeat and Jaspreet Jazz brings a very western touch to this song with his voice."

== Other versions ==
The song was later released as a single in Malayalam with same name sung by Vipin Xavior and Ranjini Jose for the film's Malayalam version. The song is re-composed and re-mixed by Devi Sri Prasad for the soundtrack of 2021 Hindi film Radhe with lyrics by Shabbir Ahmed and sung by Kamaal Khan and Iulia Vantur. However, unlike the Telugu version, the Hindi version was panned by critics, who criticized Salman Khan for copying Allu Arjun's steps from the original version, lacking originality, and making a mockery out of it.

== Music credits ==
Credits adapted from Aditya Music.

- Devi Sri Prasad – composer, producer
- Jaspreet Jasz, Rita – singers
- Balaji – lyrics
- Vikas Badisa – keyboards
- Kalyan – additional keyboard, rhythm
- Chota K Prasad – editor
- Sekhar – choreography
