= Red Chillies (film) =

- Theatrical release poster
- Directed by: Shaji Kailas
- Written by: A. K. Sajan
- Produced by: M. Renjith
- Starring: Mohanlal
- Cinematography: Shaji Kumar
- Edited by: Samjith
- Music by: M. Jayachandran; Rajamani (Score)
- Production company: Rajaputhra Visual Media
- Distributed by: Vaishaka Release
- Release date: 14 February 2009
- Country: India
- Language: Malayalam

Red Chillies is a 2009 Indian Malayalam-language crime thriller film directed by Shaji Kailas and written by A. K. Sajan, starring Mohanlal in the lead role. It was produced by M. Renjith under Rajaputhra Visual Media and distributed by Vaishaka Release. The film also stars Thilakan, Biju Menon, Siddique and Vijayaraghavan. Red Chillies was released in India on 14 February 2009 on Valentine's Day. The film was a moderate success at the box office.

== Plot ==
As part of the disinvestment policy of the Union Cabinet, Hindustan Artillery Limited (H.A.L), a public sector undertaking which manufacturers pistols and rifles for the Indian Armed Forces starts to float their shares. O.M.R Group, an oil business conglomerate based in Singapore owned by O.M.R purchases 40% of the shares. Citing threat to national security, a mass and indefinite strike is organised by the labourers of H.A.L against the deal. The strike is led by veteran Communist leader Com.Mani Varghese who is greatly admired and has a huge following. Though labelled as a nemesis of innovative developmental projects, Com.Mani is aware about the interests, intentions and unscrupulous nature of corporate houses.

Another business group in Kochi led by Franco Alangadan in partnership with an unknown powerful individual plans strategies to thwart the deal by any means. On New Year's Eve, Com. Mani instructs Com.Surendran to post a confidential letter and goes to the make shift strike shed in order to sleep with the aggrieved labourers. Things take a violent turn when radio jockeys of O.M.R F.M are suspected of murdering Ricky and a brutal hit and run on the labourers striking in front of the H.A.L company at midnight. Com.Mani and several other labourers are killed in the accident, where the investigation is handled by Vishal and SP Stalin Mani, son of Com.Mani, who is at the verge of an emotional outburst. Stalin contends that O.M.R arranged for the killings and nabs the evading RJ's from Tamil Nadu.

Being a lawyer himself, O.M.R appears for the radio jockeys and proves their innocence at the court. The almost acquittal of the F.M Jockeys (Seeking a remand instead, to safeguard their lives from the still unknown adversary). Unbeknownst to the society, O.M.R is the son of a yesteryear renowned ISRO scientist, who committed suicide out of public humiliation when a false and grave charge of espionage was charged on him. Ramanathan is still haunted by those agonizing memories (including the suicide of both his sisters). After further developments and the interrogation of Franco, O.M.R realises that Stalin is actually the main conspirator. In spite of being DP officer, Stalin amassed wealth through illegal land deals and is revealed to be Franco's secret business partner.

Com.Mani was aware of his son's corrupt nature and had gathered incriminating evidences against him. Mani had confronted his son and informed him about the initiation of a vigilance investigation and his decision to notify his misdeeds to his close friend and CM. The letter handed over to Comrade Surendran contained a request by Com.Mani to the Chief Minister to dismiss Stalin from service and to take stern action against him. After the revelations, Stalin is disavowed by his mother and arrested by the cops.

== Cast ==
- Mohanlal as Oyyarath Magaranth Ramanathan / O.M.R
- Thilakan as Sakhavu Mani Varghese
- Biju Menon as SP Stalin Mani Varghese IPS,Main Antagonist
- Siddique as Commissioner Vyasan IPS
- Vijayaraghavan as Colonel Shone Raj / Headmaster
- Vijayakumar as Inspector Louie Pothan
- Ganesh Kumar as Inspector Upendra Varma
- Jagatheesh as Surendran, Mani Varghese's assistant
- Sukumari as Mani Varghese's wife and Stalin's mother
- Biju Pappan as Satheeshan, O.M.R's assistant
- Maniyanpilla Raju as SI Aaruchamy
- Ranjini Jose as Anna Bella
- Dhanya Mary Varghese as Lamna Shankar
- Mrudula Murali as Varada Bhattadirippadu
- Saba Khan as Jennifer
- Julia George as Maglin
- Leena Maria Paul as Roya Kareena
- Neena as Sahasra
- Priya Atlee as Vega Nambiathiri
- Ruksha as Fabi Akthar
- Samjitha as Roopa Dev
- Reshmi Boban as Stalin's wife
- Hareesh Peradi as Franco Alangadan, Stalin's partner( secondary antagonist)
- Biyon as Ricky
- Jagannatha Varma as Sasthri, O.M.R's mentor
- T. P. Madhavan as Iyengar
- Nedumudi Venu as O.M.R's Father (Photo Presence)
- Srividya as O.M.R's Mother (Photo Presence)

== Production ==
The film introduced several newcomers in the cast. Singer Renjini Jose debuted as an actress, beside singing two songs in the film with one featuring herself.

== Soundtrack ==
The film features two songs composed by M. Jayachandran, with lyrics by Gireesh Puthenchery. The background score was composed by C. Rajamani.

| No. | Title | Singer(s) | Length |
|---|---|---|---|
| 1. | "Chendeloru Vandu" | Reetha, Rasmi Vijayan, Sayanora Philip, Renjini Jose | 4:36 |
| 2. | "Mazha Peyyanu" | Reetha, Renjini Jose | 4:56 |

== Release ==
Red Chillies was released in Kerala on 14 February 2009 on Valentine's Day. It opened in 80 screens across Kerala. The Indian Express critic described the film as "stylish and slick". The film was a moderate success at the box office with highest opening at that time.
