= Rita Thyagarajan =

Indian singer (born 1984)

Rita
- Born: Rita Thyagarajan; 10 June 1984 (age 42); Chennai, Tamil Nadu, India
- Genre: Playback singing
- Occupations: Singer, designer
- Years active: 2007–present
- Website: www.ritasinger.in

Rita Thyagarajan alias Sucharitha Thyagarajan (born 10 June 1984), known mononymously as Rita, is an Indian playback singer who sings in Tamil, Telugu, Hindi, English, Kannada and Malayalam languages.

== Early life ==
Rita was born in Chennai, Tamil Nadu. She was exposed to classical music very early in life and started attending classical Carnatic music lessons at the age of five. Her mother Lalitha Thyagarajan is a veteran illustrator and artist in Chennai and also a classical veena player while her father is employed with a popular Indian daily. She later started learning Hindustani classical music and has trained under celebrated masters in Chennai. Her sister is also trained in classical Carnatic music and runs her own design consultancy business in Chennai. Rita did her early schooling in P.S. Senior Secondary School in Mylapore and moved on to do a bachelor's degree in design from Stella Maris College like her mother and sister. It was in college that she discovered her penchant for other styles of music and experimented with commercial film and Western styles.

She is also a graphic designer and visualiser and co-founder of a design studio of integrated freelance professionals called Utopik.

== Early career ==
Rita started her career with D. Imman, who contacted her after listening to her demo CD which she had recorded after college. "Yendan Varungaalaveetukaraney" from the movie Aanai was the first song she recorded and from then she has recorded over 300 songs and jingles in all major South Indian languages. She got her big break with the song "Vada Mapillai" in Villu, and then recorded songs like "Allegra" and "Mambo mamiyaa" for Kandasamy in Tamil. She was nominated for the Filmfare Award for the song "Allegra". Her song "Vada Mapillai" won Best Song of the Year at the Radio Mirchi Music awards. She recorded songs in Telugu like "Khilaadikoona" from Athidhi for Mani Sharma and "Panchadharabomma" for M. M. Keeravani which again won the Song of the Year award at the Radio Mirchi music awards.

Rita has worked with music directors like Ilaiyaraaja, Yuvan Shankar Raja, Mani Sharma, D. Imman, Vidyasagar, Devi Sri Prasad, S.S. Thaman, M. Jeychandran, and M. M. Keeravani. She also performs for stage shows in Singapore, Malaysia, Dubai, Sri Lanka, London, Amsterdam, France, Muscat, Canada, USA, and Australia.

== Tamil ==
Year	Film	Song title	Music director	Notes
2005	Aanai	"Yendan Varungaala Veetukaaranae"	D. Imman	
2006	Saravana	"Unnoda Purushanaaga"	Srikanth Deva	
2006	Azhagai Irukkirai Bayamai Irukkirathu	"Ilai Udir Kaalam"	Yuvan Shankar Raja	
2006	Naalai	"Azhagiya Dhoorathil"	Karthik Raja	
2006	Thiruvilaiyaadal Aarambam	"Kannukul Aedho"	D. Imman	
2007	Oru Ponnu Oru Paiyan	"Kalkona Udhattu Kaari"	Karthik Raja	
2007	Aarya	"Jillendra Theeyae"	Mani Sharma	
2007	Parattai Engira Azhagu Sundaram	"Engeda Azhagu"	Gurukiran	
2007	Maamadurai	"Madhurai Madhuraidhaan"	Karthik Raja	
2007	Cheena Thaana 001	"Morattu Payalae"	Deva	
2007	Malaikottai	"Uyirae Uyirae"	Mani Sharma	
2007	Kalloori	"June July Maadam"	Joshua Sridhar	
2007	Gillida Aata (Tamil version)	"Purushan Kattura Vayasula"	Devi Sri Prasad	
2007	Yaradee Nee Mohini	"Oru naalaikkul"	Yuvan Shankar Raja	
2008	Arasangam	"Jil Jil Mazhayil"	Srikanth Deva	
2008	Sandai	"October Maadathil"	Dheena	
2008	Uliyin Osai	"Sozha Vala Naadu"	Ilaiyaraaja	
2008	Thala Pullai	"Yedho Yedho"	S A Rajkumar	
2008	Mahesh, Saranya Matrum Palar	"Vizhiyil Vizhiyil"	Vidyasagar	
2008	Kee Mu	"Azhagaana Pasanga"	Kalaivanan	
2008	Dhanam	"Ilamai Kanavugal"	Ilaiyaraaja	
2009	Villu	"Vaada Mapilai"	Devi Sri Prasad	
2009	Villu	"Jalsa"	Devi Sri Prasad	
2009	Karthik Anitha	"Oh Nenje"	Jack Anand	
2009	Azhagar Malai	"Muthamma''	Ilaiyaraaja	
2009	Kandasamy	"Allegra"	Devi Sri Prasad	
2009	Kandasamy	"Mambo Mamiyaa"	Devi Sri Prasad	
2009	Thoranai	"Pelican Paravaigal"	Mani Sharma	
2009	Vaalmiki	"Poo Sirikkudhu"	Ilaiyaraaja	
2009	Malai Malai	"Anbu Manam"	Mani Sharma	
2009	Thiru Thiru Thuru Thuru	"Thiru Thiru Vizhiyae"	Mani Sharma	
2009	Jaganmohini	"Poothadhu Poovu"	Ilaiyaraaja	
2009	Jaganmohini	"Ponmanitheril"	Ilaiyaraaja	
2009	Rettaisuzhi	"Poochaandi"	Karthik Raja	
2009	Mathiya Chennai	"Unnai Patri Sonnal"	Ilaiyaraaja	
2009	Ithanai Naala Engirindhaai	"Jaalilo jimgana"	Dheena	
2009	Meipporul	"Kalyana Kaviyam"	Rahul Atul	Indian-American Tamil film
2009	Odipolama	"Ading Ading"	D. Imman	
2010	Aridhu Aridhu	"Missing Something"	Thaman	
2010	Sura	"Siragadikkum Nilavu"	Mani Sharma	
2010	Guru Sishyan	"Kadhara Kadhara"	Dheena	
2010	Vallakottai	"Sarakku Rediyaa"	Dheena	
2010	Nagaram Marupakkam	"Konjam Konjam"	Thaman	
2010	Bayam Ariyaan	"Pallanguzhi Kannam"	P. C. Shivan	
2010	Ambasamudram Ambani	"Kola Kolaya Mundirikka"	Karunas	
2011	Kaavalan	"Pattamboochi"	Vidyasagar	
2011	Bhavani	"Mullai Malar Mele	Dheena	
2011	Singam Puli	"Kangalal"	Mani Sharma	
2011	Thalapulla	"Ulagathin"	S. A. Rajkumar	
2011	Thalapulla	"Edho Edho"	S. A. Rajkumar	
2011	Ayyan	"Sivagami"	Ilaiyaraaja	
2011	Mappillai	"Love Love"	Mani Sharma	
2011	Sabash Sariyana Potti	"Sabaash Seriyaana Potti"	Thaman	
2011	Yuvan	"Fashion Show"	Joshua Sridhar	
2011	Yuvan	"Pecha"	Joshua Sridhar	
2011	Muran	"Andhimandharai"	Saajan	
2011	Uyarthiru 420	"Azhagiya Raavana"	Mani Sharma	
2011	Vaagai Sooda Vaa	"Thaila Kili"	Mohamaad Ghibran	
2011	Pesu	"Idhayam pesudhey"	Yuvan Shankar Raja	
2011	Mankatha	"Vilaiyaadu Mankatha"	Yuvan Shankar Raja	
2011	Osthe	"Unnaley Unnaley"	Thaman	
2011	Mambattiyaan	"Mambattiyaan"	Thaman	
2011	Mambattiyaan	"Yedho Aagudhey"	Thaman	
2011	Mouna Guru	"Yennaidhu"	Thaman	
2011	Sridhar	"Siruvan Sirumiyai"	Rahul Raj	
2012	Maasi	"Ondi Ondi"	Dheena	
2012	Nellai Santhippu	"Kannamuchi Kannamuchi"	Yugendran	
2012	Mayilu	"Aadhisokka"	Ilaiyaraaja	
2012	Mayilu	"Dukkam Enna"	Ilaiyaraaja	
2012	Ishtam	"Dhinakku Dhinna"	Thaman	
2012	Sillunu Oru Sandhippu	"Bussey Bussey"	F. S. Faizal	
2012	Kai	"Meesariye"	Ishaan Dev	
2014	Jigarthanda	"Kannamma"	Santhosh Narayanan	
2014	Vizhi Moodi Yosithaal	"Ellora Sirpam"	B.Aathif	
2014	Sooran	"Thappae Thappillai"	P B Balaji	
2014	Sooran	"Vaa Maama"	P B Balaji	
2016	Oyee	"Entha Ooru Ponalum"	Ilaiyaraaja	
2016	Narathan	"Saaral Veesum"	Mani Sharma	
2016	Bayam Oru Payanam	"Wish You A Happy New Year"	Y. R. Prasad	
2017	Kalavu Thozhirchalai	"Yedho Yedho"	Shyam Benjamin	
2018	Saamy Square	"Molagapodiye"	Devi Sri Prasad	
2018	Santhoshathil Kalavaram	"Kaatru Vaanga Nalla Kaatru"	Sivanag	
2018	Padaiveeran	"Mattikittein"	Karthik Raja	
2019	Sagaa	"Yaayum"	Shabir	

== Telugu ==
Year	Film	Song title	Music director	Notes
2006	Stalin	"I Want A Spider Man"	Mani Sharma	
2006	Pellaina Kothalo	"Chelivo"	Agashtya	
2007	Chirutha	"Love U Ra"	Mani Sharma	
2007	Athidhi	"Khiladi Koona"	Mani Sharma	
2007	Athidhi	"Gona Gona"	Mani Sharma	
2007	Don	"Neekai Nenu"	Raghava Lawrence	
2007	Dubai Seenu	"Once Upon"	Mani Sharma	
2007	Madhumasam	"Promise Chestuvunna"	Mani Sharma	
2007	Madhumasam	"Valentine"	Mani Sharma	
2007	Madhumasam	"Vasantham"	Mani Sharma	
2007	Godava	"Kaaya Panda"	Mani Sharma	
2007	Godava	"Current Kaastha"	Mani Sharma	
2007	Nava Vasantham	"Choosa Choosa"	S. A. Rajkumar	
2007	Nava Vasantham	"Thakakimi"	S. A. Rajkumar	
2007	Pourudu	"Andaalane Andistha"	Mani Sharma	
2007	Toss	"Prema Prema"	Mani Sharma	
2007	Toss	"Yeh Babuji"	Mani Sharma	
2008	Kantri	"Jantar Mantar"	Mani Sharma	
2008	Yuvatha	"Kotikokatila Ammayi"	Mani Sharma	
2008	Okka Magaadu	"Nanu Paalinchaga"	Mani Sharma	
2008	Okka Magaadu	"Okka Magaadu"	Mani Sharma	
2008	Okka Magaadu	"Rey"	Mani Sharma	
2008	Souryam	"Pillo Naa"	Mani Sharma	
2008	Hero	"Ka Kalavye"	Mani Sharma	
2008	Hero	"Sye Kurrade"	Mani Sharma	
2008	Jalsa	"Jalsa"	Devi Sri Prasad	
2008	Baladoor	"Yetu Podam Cheppamma"	K. M. Radha Krishnan	
2008	Sasirekha Parinayam	"Bejawada"	Mani Sharma	
2008	Bhadradri	"Ringa Ringa Roses"	Mani Sharma	
2009	Arya 2	"Mr. Perfect"	Devi Sri Prasad	
2009	Fitting Master	"Padhaharu"	Chinna	
2009	Magadheera	"Panchadara Bomma"	M.M.Keeravani	
2009	Billa	"Ellora Shilpanni"	Mani Sharma	
2009	Billa	"Ne Pataasu"	Mani Sharma	
2009	Mallanna	"Allegra"	Devi Sri Prasad	
2009	Mallanna	"Mambo Mamiya"	Devi Sri Prasad	
2009	Evaraina Epudaina	"Madhura Yathana"	Mani Sharma	
2009	Evaraina Epudaina	"Malli Malli"	Mani Sharma	
2009	Evaraina Epudaina	"Vaare Vaa"	Mani Sharma	
2009	Kalasala	"June July"	Joshua Sridhar	
2010	Adhurs	"Chary"	Devi Sri Prasad	
2010	Adhurs	"Chandrakala"	Devi Sri Prasad	
2010	Subhapradam	"Orimi Chalamma O Bhumatoi"	Mani Sharma	
2010	Happy Happy Ga	"Navvalante"	Mani Sharma	
2010	Maa Annayya Bangaram	"Mallee Mallee"	S. A. Rajkumar	
2010	Ragada	"Ragada Ragada"	S. Thaman	
2010	Ragada	"Meesamunna Manmadhuda"	S. Thaman	
2010	Kathi Kantha Rao	"Osenaa Rowdi Pilla"	Mallikarjun	
2010	Don Seenu	"Naa Yanakana"	Mani Sharma	
2010	Brindavanam	"Brindavanam (Theme of Hero)"	S. Thaman	
2010	Sye Aata	"Sye Aata"	Devi Sri Prasad	
2011	Shakti	"Maha Rudhra Sakthi"	Mani Sharma	
2011	Mirapakay	"Chirugaley"	S. Thaman	
2011	Mirapakay	"Mirapakaay"	S. Thaman	
2011	Dookudu	"Chulbuli Chulbuli"	S. Thaman	
2011	7th Sense	"Yellae Lama"	Harris Jayaraj	
2011	Maaro	"Picasso Sathiya"	Mani Sharma	
2011	Kanchana	"Nalupu"	S. Thaman	
2012	Adhinayakudu	"Olammi Ammi"	Kalyani Malik	
2012	Adhinayakudu	"Guruda Itu Raaraa"	Kalyani Malik	
2012	Tuneega Tuneega	"Dhigu Dhigu Jabilee"	Karthik Raja	
2012	Tuneega Tuneega	"Ahista Ahista"	Karthik Raja	
2012	Sarocharu	"Raccha Rambola"	Devi Sri Prasad	
2012	Uu Kodathara? Ulikki Padathara?	"Abbabba Abbabba"	Bobo Shashi	
2012	All the Best	"Sundari Tingaari"	Hemachandra	
2013	Jabardasth	"Meghamala"	S. Thaman	
2013	Attarintiki Daredi	"Deva Devam"	Devi Sri Prasad	
2013	Greeku Veerudu	"Ne Vinnadi Nijamena"	S. Thaman	
2013	Shadow	"Aythalaka"	S. Thaman	
2013	Bhai	"O Pilla Pilla"	Devi Sri Prasad	
2013	Mr. Pellikoduku	"O Meri Siri Siri"	S. A. Rajkumar	
2014	Bangaru Kodipetta	"Bulli Bulli Pitta"	Mahesh Shankar	
2014	Govindudu Andarivadele	"Kokkokkodi"	Yuvan Shankar Raja	
2014	Legend	"Time Bomb"	Devi Sri Prasad	
2015	S/O Satyamurthy	"Chal Chalo Chalo"	Devi Sri Prasad	
2015	Kumari 21F	"Bang Bang Bangkok"	Devi Sri Prasad	
2015	Srimanthudu	"Jaago"	Devi Sri Prasad	
2017	Duvvada Jagannadham	"Seeti Maar"	Devi Sri Prasad	
2017	Mahanubhavudu	"Eppudainna"	S. Thaman	
2018	Naa Nuvve	"Hey Hey ILU (Female Version)"	Sharreth	
2018	Bharat Ane Nenu	"O Vasumathi"	Devi Sri Prasad	
2018	Pantham	"Ek Dham"	Gopi Sundar	
2018	Chal Mohan Ranga	"Miami"	S. Thaman	
2018	Saamy	"Mirchi Poduma"	Devi Sri Prasad	
2022	Super Machi	"Chusanae Chusanae"	S. Thaman	

== Kannada ==
Year	Film	Song title	Music director	Notes
2010	Ullasa Utsaha	"Chakori Chakori"	G. V. Prakash Kumar	
2011	Hare Rama Hare Krishna	Angel Angel	Ilaiyaraaja	
2011	Prince	"Khushiyali"	V. Harikrishna	
2012	AK 56	"Karedaaga"	Abhiman Roy	
2017	Chakravarthy	"Naughty Girl"	Arjun Janya	

== Malayalam ==
Year	Film	Song title	Music director	Notes
2011	Urumi	"Aranne Aranne"	Deepak Dev	
2011	Urumi	"Kondaadu Kondaadu" (D)	Deepak Dev	
2012	Mr. Marumakan	"Maayo Maayo"	Suresh Peters	
2014	Koothara	"Kannethadoore"	Gopi Sundar	

== Television title songs (Tamil) ==
Year	Series Name	Song name	Channel	Note
2014	Kalyana Parisu	"Kalyana Parisu"	Sun TV	
2017	Poove Poochudava	"Ethir Ethire"	Zee Tamil	
2017	Alaipayuthey	"Paravai Podum Osai Thane"	MediaCorp Vasantham	Singaporean Tamil Soap Opera
2017	Vidhi	"Vidhiye Vidhiye"	Sun TV	
2019	Nila	"Paru Para Para Paravaiye En Siragai Vaangi Kondu"	Sun TV	
2025	Iru Malargal	"Idhaya Azhagu"	Sun TV	

== Rita - Sunrisers - Tamil / Telugu ==
- "Rita - Sunrisers - Tamil / Telugu - YouTube". youtube.com. 16 April 2013.
- "In tune with the times". go-nxg.com.
- My first break - Singer Rita

== Sources ==
- "Welcome to Singer Rita's website". ritasinger.in. Archived from the original on 7 July 2013.
- "Rita singer interview part1 - YouTube". youtube.com. 4 December 2011.
- "Rita Thyagarajan Miami Release". YouTube.
- "Rita Thyagarajan Bharat ane nenu pre-Release". YouTube. 7 April 2018.
- "Rita Thyagarajan super hit Yaayum, Sagaa". YouTube. 11 August 2016.
- "Rita, Allegro at Super Masti Nellore". YouTube. 15 May 2017.
- "Rita Thyagarajan Anjali cover". YouTube. 2 June 2016.
- "Rita and Haricharan, Poolane Kunukeyamanta, Super Masti Etv". YouTube. 15 May 2017.
- "Rita and Sooraj Santhosh, Kilimanjaro, Super Masti Etv". YouTube. 27 June 2017.
- "Rita and Kaarunya, Panchakattu, Chari, Super Masti Etv". YouTube. 27 June 2017.
- "Rita Thyagarajan Devotional album, Strumm Music". YouTube. 30 June 2015.
