= Radhe (2021 film) =

2021 Indian film by Prabhu Deva

- Official release poster
- Directed by: Prabhu Deva
- Written by: A.C Mugil; Vijay Maurya
- Story by: Kang Yoon-sung
- Based on: The Outlaws by Kang Yoon-sung
- Produced by: Salman Khan; Sohail Khan; Atul Agnihotri; Nikhil Namit
- Starring: Salman Khan; Disha Patani; Randeep Hooda; Jackie Shroff
- Cinematography: Ayananka Bose
- Edited by: Ritesh Soni
- Music by: Songs: Devi Sri Prasad; Himesh Reshammiya; Sajid-Wajid; Score: Sanchit Balhara and Ankit Balhara
- Production companies: Zee Studios; Salman Khan Films; Sohail Khan Productions; Reel Life Production Private Limited
- Distributed by: Zee Studios; Zee Plex; ZEE5
- Release date: 13 May 2021
- Running time: 109 minutes
- Country: India
- Language: Hindi
- Budget: ₹90 crore
- Box office: ₹18.33 crore

Radhe: Your Most Wanted Bhai is a 2021 Indian Hindi-language action thriller film directed by Prabhu Deva and produced by Salman Khan, Sohail Khan, Atul Agnihotri and Zee Studios. It is a remake of the 2017 South Korean film The Outlaws. It stars Khan, Disha Patani, Randeep Hooda and Jackie Shroff.

Radhe was originally scheduled to release theatrically on 22 May 2020, but was postponed indefinitely due to the COVID-19 pandemic. The film was finally released on 13 May 2021, coinciding with Eid al-Fitr, as premium video on demand on Zee Plex through ZEE5 in India, with a theatrical release overseas. Though Radhe received highly negative reviews from critics and audiences alike, who criticized the story, screenplay, direction, unoriginality, chemistry and VFX, with 4.2 million views, it became the most watched OTT film on the day of its release. Publications like The Indian Express listed Radhe as one of the worst Indian films of 2021.

== Plot ==
Rana, a ruthless gangster, shifts to Mumbai to start a drug business. He kills a man for not returning the money he borrowed from him, the man is an accomplice of Mansoor Bhai. Rana starts selling drugs not only to college students but to school children as well. Due to this, 12 people commit suicide in 3 months due to drug addiction. Mumbai Police sends two senior officers to stop Rana but they are heavily drugged and killed. The police force decides to send Radhe, an undercover police officer to resolve the case. He accepts the job. Radhe meets Diya Abhyankar, a model, and falls in love with her. Radhe tells her that he is an aspiring model and that his name is Bholu. Diya slowly falls in love with Radhe. Radhe finds out from fellow officers that there are two gangs that operate under their jurisdiction. The first gang is led by Dilawar and the second gang is led by Dagdu Dada. Both the gangs are at war with each other.

Radhe defeats all the men in Dagdu Dada's gang including Dada. Radhe arrests one of Dada's men and questions him. He tells him that Dilawar's brother Mansoor deals with drugs. Radhe goes to Dilawar's area and threatens his men to bring him out. Dilawar agrees but Radhe arrests Dilawar. He makes Dilawar and Dada find peace with each other. Rana teams up with Mansoor and they lure Dilawar to them. Rana and his men brutally stab Dilawar to death. Later, Radhe finds out that Diya is the sister of Radhe's senior officer Avinash Abhyankhar. Avinash approves of their relationship. Rana and his guards kill Dada's gang members. In the next two days, Rana sells more drugs. Radhe gets information that Rana and his guards will be going to the Allied PD club. Radhe goes to the pub and fights Rana in the restroom. Radhe gets beaten up by Rana and his guards. They escape just as the police arrive.

Diya finds out that Radhe is a police officer and confesses her love to him. Radhe arrests Mansoor and convinces him to join his side. Radhe beats up Rana's guards with the help of Dagdu but one of them escapes and informs Rana. Rana kills Dagdu in revenge. Radhe is deemed incompetent and another officer is handed the case. Radhe, with the help of Avinash, continues his job covertly. Meanwhile, one of Rana's guards, who was arrested, meets two police officers and they make a deal. The officers will let the guard escape if he supplies them with drugs. The guard accepts the deal. The two officers are revealed to be hired by Radhe as a ruse. Rana's guard meets up with the officers later and gets captured by Radhe. Rana finds out that Mansoor works with Radhe and kills him.

Radhe seeks the help of school students, they accept and start taking photos of Rana's gang and the people they supply drugs to. Radhe along with his fellow police officers, arrests all of them. One of the police officers named Nikisha gets caught by Rana. Rana is about to kill her but Radhe saves her. Rana escapes and Radhe chases after him but loses sight of him after a while. The next day, some of Rana's guards who were arrested, escape. Radhe kills most of them except for one, who gets in a helicopter with Rana. Rana plans to move away from Mumbai and create a drug business elsewhere. Radhe jumps onto the helicopter and fights Rana and the guard. Due to their fight, the helicopter crashes, killing the guard. Avinash arrives and tries to kill Rana but Rana thrashes Avinash and is about to kill him. Radhe saves Avinash and fights Rana. Radhe gets the upper hand and finally kills Rana.

== Cast ==
- Salman Khan as Radhe
- Disha Patani as Diya Abhyankar, Radhe's love interest and Avinash's sister
- Randeep Hooda as Rana
- Jackie Shroff as ACP Crime Branch Avinash Abhyankar, Radhe's senior officer and Diya's brother
- Sudhanshu Pandey as Dilawar (Cameo Appearance)
- Megha Akash as Nikisha
- Bharath as Inspector Sarvesh
- Gautam Gulati as Girgit
- Govind Namdev as Joint Commissioner (Operations) I. G. Ramesh Patil
- Pravin Tarde as Dagdu Dada
- Darshan Jariwala as Home Secretary
- Siddhartha Jadhav as Ranjeet Mawani
- Arjun Kanungo as Mansoor
- Ihana Dhillon as Nasreen, Mansoor's wife
- Naufal Azmir Khan as Ranveer
- Shawar Ali as Vipul Shah
- Vishwajeet Pradhan as ACP Arjun
- VJ Andy as Jazz, a photographer
- Kulvinder Warwal as Mor Krishna
- Vijay Singh as Ali
- Sangay Tsheltrim as Lota
- Aaryan Arora as Sumeet
- Sumit Chandra as News Reporter
- Shruti Bisht as Sumeet's sister
- Parveen Kaur as Sumeet's mother
- Mitansh Lulla as Azaan
- Micky Makhija as Mumbai Police Commissioner
- Pravesh Rana as Heeralal
- Shubhankar Tripathi as Mannu
- Kamaal Malik as Landlord
- Nancy Jain as Sairah
- Saleem Baig as Nizamuddin
- Ajay Singh as Crime Branch Officer
- Sanjeev Sharma as Crime Branch Officer
- Jacqueline Fernandez in a special appearance in the song "Dil De Diya"

== Production ==
=== Development ===
In September 2019, media reports speculated that Prabhu Deva will direct Salman Khan's next project after completing Dabangg 3 and the film will be released on the occasion of Eid al-Fitr (22 May 2020; the date at which Khan's shelved film Inshallah was speculated to release). An article from Deccan Chronicle reported that the project was a sequel to Wanted (2009), being titled Wanted 2 but that was not confirmed by the filmmakers. In October 2019, the film was rather confirmed to be an official remake of the 2017 South Korean film The Outlaws which is based on real-life gang wars between Chinese-Korean gangs in Seoul.

=== Pre-production ===
On 18 October 2019, Salman Khan revealed the film's title as Radhe through the motion poster of Dabangg 3; also confirming it to be a 2020 Eid release.

=== Casting ===
Disha Patani, Randeep Hooda and Jackie Shroff were cast in pivotal roles, the former in her second collaboration with Khan after Bharat. In November 2019, Bharath Srinivasan was reported to be a part of the film; Gautam Gulati also confirmed his presence in the film.

=== Filming ===
The film's principal photography commenced on 1 November 2019. The first schedule of the film took place on 4 November, at Mehboob Studios in Mumbai. Khan introduced new guidelines for the cast and crew members to be followed on the sets which was meant to lay emphasis on maintaining discipline on the sets and maintaining a buddy-system for helping newcomers or juniors.

The second schedule of the film took place on 21 January 2020 in Goa, where a few chase scenes featuring Khan and Hooda were filmed. For the climax shot, the makers spent ₹7.5 crore on the visual effects. The shooting of the film was supposed to wrap up by 21 February 2020, but the makers planned another schedule in Thailand, which was then cancelled by the COVID-19 outbreak. It was reported that Khan was working on the post-production of the film at his farmhouse, however Khan's manager claimed that there was no plan for post-production as all the production works were halted as per the directives of the government.

The shooting of the film resumed on 4 October 2020, where a few patchwork scenes and a song featuring Khan and Patani were filmed. The film was wrapped up on 14 October 2020.

== Music ==
Radhe

Soundtrack album by Sajid–Wajid, Devi Sri Prasad and Himesh Reshammiya
- Released: 4 May 2021
- Recorded: 2020
- Genre: Feature film soundtrack
- Length: 15:34
- Language: Hindi
- Label: Zee Music Company

Official audio
- Radhe – Full Album on YouTube

The film's soundtrack is composed by Sajid–Wajid, Devi Sri Prasad and Himesh Reshammiya, with lyrics being written by Shabbir Ahmed, Sajid Khan and Kunaal Vermaa. The film score is composed by Sanchit Balhara and Ankit Balhara.

Radhe is the posthumous work of Wajid Khan (of the Sajid–Wajid duo) and the title track was his last composition before his death in June 2020. This also makes it the first solo album of Sajid Khan. Prasad recreated his song "Seeti Maar" from the Telugu film DJ: Duvvada Jagannadham (2017). The music video was released on 26 April 2021. Upon release, the song was panned by critics, who criticized Salman Khan for copying Allu Arjun's steps from the original version, lacking originality, and making a mockery out of it. Himesh Reshammiya has also composed one song in the film.

Track listing
No.	Title	Lyrics	Music	Singer(s)	Length
1.	"Seeti Maar"	Shabbir Ahmed	Devi Sri Prasad	Kamaal Khan, Iulia Vântur	4:03
2.	"Dil De Diya"	Shabbir Ahmed	Himesh Reshammiya	Kamaal Khan, Payal Dev	4:46
3.	"Radhe – Title Track"	Sajid Khan	Sajid–Wajid	Sajid Khan	3:01
4.	"Zoom Zoom"	Kunaal Vermaa	Sajid–Wajid	Ash King, Iulia Vantur, Sajid Khan	3:44
Total length:					15:34

== Release ==
Radhe had a limited theatrical release on 13 May 2021. On 21 April 2021, Khan further announced that the film will be released in all operational theatres, and on pay-per-view and digital streaming methods by Zee Plex and ZEE5. It became the first Indian film to have a hybrid release, as theatres in Mumbai and Delhi were closed. The film was welcomed by film trade analysts and exhibitors as a possible "turning point" for Indian cinema's economy during the pandemic. Advanced bookings for the film in the Middle East regions (United Arab Emirates, Qatar, Oman, Kuwait, Saudi Arabia and Bahrain) began on 29 April 2021, two weeks before the release schedule.

Khan, in a video-call interaction, apologised to the theatre owners for the poor collection of the film due to a limited theatrical release. Khan also assured the plans of a theatrical re-release when the pandemic subsides.

Zee Plex revealed the starting price of the film as ₹249 per view in late April 2021, allowing the users to watch the film through digital streaming as well as in leading DTH services. Furthermore, ZEE5 announced a Radhe Combo, a package priced at ₹499 allowing users to watch the film and access contents of the platform for one year. Internationally, the film was made available for renting and streaming on Apple TV.

Khan and Zee Studios announced that the revenues of the film will be donated to COVID-19 relief funds.

The film was originally scheduled to release on 15 October 2019, but was postponed due to the COVID-19 pandemic. The distribution rights of the film were sold to Yash Raj Films upon the initial release, with T-Series obtaining the music rights and Amazon Prime Video acquiring the digital rights, but later in January 2021, it was reported that Khan had signed a new deal with Zee Studios, and sold the entire rights of the film (including theatrical, digital, satellite and music rights) to the company for ₹230 crore. The deal was later renegotiated citing the pandemic situation, with the revised bid being ₹190 crore in May 2021.

== Reception ==
=== Box office ===
The film grossed over ₹18.33 crore (US$1.9 million).

=== Critical response ===
The film received highly negative reviews from critics and audience alike. On the review aggregator website Rotten Tomatoes, 8% of 12 critics' reviews are positive, with an average rating of 4/10.

Anna M. M. Vetticad of Firstpost gave Radhe a rating of 0/5 and wrote, "This film is so generic that it would be a challenge to write down the plot from A-Z after a single viewing. Salman Khan's performance reiterates the fact that he is not looking at gaining any validation from the audiences taking them for granted." She also criticised the movie for not giving the lead actress enough screen time by stating, "The movie treats its ‘heroine’ as nothing but a body on display whose sole job is to give the hero someone to fall in love with, dance with and protect." Stutee Ghosh from The Quint gave Radhe a rating of 0.5/5. Calling it a "cringefest" she wrote, "Radhe is a loud, senseless and offensive film that has little regard for women, the police force and the audience's intelligence in general." She further stated, "Radhe is frustratingly tone deaf to how it promotes police brutality and the almost suffocating toxic masculinity that is sprayed on like a cheap deodorant." Shubhra Gupta from The Indian Express gave Radhe a rating of 0.5/5 and wrote, "Radhe is a mindless, moronic mess of a movie in which Salman does every single thing he's done a zillion times." Soumya Srivastava from The Hindustan Times called Radhe a torture of a film and one of Khan's worst movies. She described Radhe as a "cringeworthy movie" and stated, "The movie is nothing but a collection of action sequences piled upon each other as Disha's tight dresses, some dance numbers, and goons saying 'apun' a lot act as fillers."

Saibal Chatterjee from NDTV gave the film a rating of 2/5 and opined that, "The film dumps a whole lot of dross on us with a certain degree of surface stink." He concluded by saying, "Radhe has no inducements for diehard Salman Khan fans to keep them interested". Trade analyst Taran Adarsh gave Radhe a rating of 2/5 and called it "Disappointing". Calling its screenplay and writing "lackluster" he wrote, "Radhe doesn't meet the sky-high expectations, The film has a clichéd plot and a predictable formula remodelled with new packaging." Anupama Chopra of Film Companion wrote, "The Salman Khan starrer is so free of craft that it hurts; Prabhudeva delivers yet another loud, numbing, pointless paean to the cult of Salman Khan." Namrata Joshi from The National Herald wrote, "Radhe is an empty vessel of a film that tries to sail through by making a lot of loud noise that signifies nothing." Criticising the framing of Patani's character she further wrote, "Diya itself is acutely offensive. It just shows the acutely conservative mindset of the makers and of the Salman Khan universe itself, where men and women are hardly ever in a relationship of equals, where the man is this self-anointed “protector” of the woman and the woman is seen as some kind of a property or possession." Sushri Sahu of Mashable criticised Radhe for glorifying police brutality, gun violence and toxic masculinity. She further wrote, "Radhe is repetitive with not just the dialogues but the rogue cop-on-a-cleaning-spree formula. It doesn't even spare the minimum of one rape assault trope. The film, in fact, looks like a brochure to sell Khan's already popular brand. It is out-and-out ‘bhai’ porn."

== See also ==
- The Roundup (film series), South Korean crime action film series including The Outlaws
