= DJ: Duvvada Jagannadham =

2017 Indian film by Harish Shankar

- Theatrical release poster
- Directed by: Harish Shankar
- Screenplay by: Ramesh Reddy; Deepak Raj
- Story by: Harish Shankar
- Produced by: Dil Raju
- Starring: Allu Arjun; Pooja Hegde; Rao Ramesh
- Cinematography: Ayananka Bose
- Edited by: Chota K. Prasad
- Music by: Devi Sri Prasad
- Production company: Sri Venkateswara Creations
- Release date: 23 June 2017
- Running time: 156 minutes
- Country: India
- Language: Telugu
- Budget: ₹50 crore
- Box office: est. ₹150 crore

DJ: Duvvada Jagannadham is a 2017 Indian Telugu-language action comedy film directed by Harish Shankar and produced by Sri Venkateswara Creations. The film stars Allu Arjun in the titular role, alongside Pooja Hegde, Rao Ramesh, Subbaraju, Murali Sharma, Vennela Kishore, Posani Krishna Murali, Tanikella Bharani and Chandra Mohan. The music was composed by Devi Sri Prasad, while the cinematography and editing were handled by Ayananka Bose and Chota K. Prasad.

DJ: Duvvada Jagannadham was released on 23 June 2017 to mixed reviews from critics and grossed over ₹150 crore, thus becoming one of the highest-grossing Telugu films of 2017.

== Plot ==
Duvvada Jagannadham Sastri, a chef working as a caterer from Vijayawada along with his Brahmin family, masquerades as DJ, an altruistic vigilante who kills wrongdoers with the help of his mentor CI Puroshottam. At his friend Vignesh's wedding, Jagannadhan meets Pooja, the daughter of Home Minister Pushpam, and falls in love with her. Royyala Naidu, a builder, also runs two fraud companies called Agro Diamond and Naidu Constructions. Naidu appoints his secretary Stephen Prakash to be chairman of Agro Diamond, but Sameer Chandra, the CEO of Agro Diamond, learns that Stephen has transferred the money elsewhere and files a case against the company.

After Vignesh's wedding, Jagannadham finds out that his uncle had committed suicide and reads the suicide note, which explains that his uncle booked an 1800-square-foot flat from Agro Diamond by spending all his savings, but when he went to pay his final installment, he found out that the company is bogus. Due to depression and the harsh words from his own daughter, he committed suicide.

Jagannadham finds out from Purushottam about the scam of ₹90,000 crore ($13.8 billion) (Note: The average exchange rate in 2017 was 65.12 Indian rupees (₹) per 1 US dollar (US$).) orchestrated by Stephen. When Sameer, who agrees to become the witness in the court, is about to get killed by hitmen hired by Stephen, DJ defeats Stephen and tells him at gunpoint to call his hitmen to abort the mission. Pushpam, who is also involved with Royyala Naidu in his crimes, gets a marriage proposal for Pooja from Naidu's son Avinash. When she meets Avinash in Abu Dhabi, she dislikes him after learning that he has schizophrenia. Pooja realizes Jagannadham's love when she returns to India and confesses her love for Jagannadham to Pushpam, who disapproves, citing his status issues in society.

Pushpam and Naidu plan to kill Jagannadham. Naidu hires Stephen for the job. Stephen lures Jagannadham with the help of his henchman, but Jagannadham overpowers them and kidnaps Stephen. DJ challenges Naidu that he will find him and make him pay for his crimes; Naidu, who doesn't know about DJ, hires an officer to find out about DJ. Jagannadham forcefully tries to interrogate Stephen about his allies, but in vain. Pooja eventually arrives in Vijayawada to confess her love to Jagannadham and sends photos of her and Jagannadham to Pushpam. Pushpam shows it to Naidu, who gets shocked as Naidu had actually seen DJ when he was threatening Stephen at gunpoint. Naidu tells Pushpam to act like he agreed to the proposal. Naidu dresses up as one of the bodyguards of Pushpam, where Pooja and Jagannadham's families meet each other, and Naidu finally recognizes that Jagannadham is DJ.

The next day, Jagannadham's sister and Vignesh are attacked by Naidu's henchman, where they are interrogated about the whereabouts of Stephen, and Jagannadham's family is also troubled by them. Jagannadham finally decides to put an end to Royyala Naidu. Jagannadham sends his family on a pilgrimage to keep them safe. Naidu's henchmen break into the house and ask Jagannadham about the whereabouts of Stephen. They capture and beat him up. Jagannadham asks about their boss. When he is about to get killed, Jagannadham asks Naidu's henchman to remove the holy rudraksha (which is a penance to his father to not be involved in violence). When the rudraksha is removed, DJ kills all the goons, who reveal that Naidu is their boss. Jagannadham calls Pooja and reveals himself as DJ and asks her for information about Avinash.

Jagannadham goes to Abu Dhabi and uses Avinash with his mental disability to find about Royyala Naidu's location. Naidu kidnaps Purushottam. Avinash arrives at the hideout and beats up Jagannadham fights for cheating him. Jagannadham shows them the money and turns Avinash against his father. Jagannadham, with the help of Avinash's mental disability, shoots Naidu dead. Stephen Prakash announces to the scam victims to provide them with their houses and their lost income, but Avinash is taken away for police interrogation.

== Cast ==
- Allu Arjun as Duvvada Jagannadha Sastry "Jagannadham"/ DJ
- Pooja Hegde as Pooja, DJ's love interest and Pushpam's daughter
- Sathvik Verma as Young DJ
- Rao Ramesh as Royyala Naidu
- Murali Sharma as Constable Purushottam, DJ's mentor
- Subbaraju as Royyala Avinash, Naidu's son
- Posani Krishna Murali as Home Minister Pushpam, Pooja's father
- Sudha as Amrutham, Pooja's mother
- Paruchuri Venkateswara Rao as Venkatachalam, Pooja's foster father
- Janaki Sabesh as Annapurna, Pooja's foster mother
- Geetha as Janaki, DJ's aunt
- Chandra Mohan as Chandram, DJ's uncle
- Tanikella Bharani as Duvvada Subrahmanya Sastry, DJ's father
- Vennela Kishore as Akella Vigneshwara Sastry 'Vignesh' "Viggu"
- Harish Uthaman as Sultan Basha
- Pavitra Lokesh as Devaki Chakravarthy, DJ's mother
- Hari Teja as Lakshmi, DJ's elder sister
- Rallapalli Narasimha as DJ's grandfather
- Vidyullekha Raman as Katyayini
- Shatru as Stephen Prakash, Naidu's secretary
- Sameer as Sameer Chandra, former CEO of Agro Diamond
- Shashank as DJ's assistant
- Sivannarayana Naripeddi as Vignesh's father
- Rajitha as Vignesh's mother
- Prabhakar as Suri
- Jeeva as gangster Lala
- Shanoor Sana as Pooja's mother
- Sravan as DJ's assistant
- Giridhar as Sarma DJ's friend
- Jhansi as Vignesh's mother-in- law
- Rupa Lakshmi

== Production ==
=== Development ===
After the success of Sarrainodu (2016), Allu Arjun announced that he will be collaborating for a Tamil-Telugu bilingual directed by N. Linguswamy, which was expected to go on floors. Meanwhile, in June 2016, he announced that his next film will be directed by Harish Shankar, and produced by Dil Raju. The film marks the second collaboration of Raju, with Arjun after Arya (2004) and Parugu (2008). While the makers are yet to finalise the cast and crew members, Devi Sri Prasad announced that he will compose music for the film. Shruti Haasan and Kajal Aggarwal were approached to play the lead actress but Pooja Hegde was eventually finalized for that role. Rao Ramesh is signed to play Royyalu Naidu, which is based on the character played by Ramesh's father Rao Gopal Rao in Aa Okkati Adakku (1992).

On 28 August 2016, the film makers announced the title of the film as Duvvada Jagannatham. The film was launched on 29 August 2016, at the office of the production house in Hyderabad.

=== Filming ===
Principal photography of the film was supposed to commence on 21 October 2016. However, the first leg of the shoot began on 4 November 2016. The filming briefly delayed after Arjun took a break, to spend some quality time with his wife Sneha Reddy, who is expecting her second child. The shooting was later resumed in January 2017.

The production crew also chose Abu Dhabi as a filming location, as they would benefit from the Emirate's 30% film production rebate. The film was shot across Abu Dhabi Global Market, Abu Dhabi National Exhibition Centre, Intercontinental Hotel, Yas Links Golf Club and Galleria Mall.

The film team placed a statue of Lord Shiva in Chennakeshava Temple in Belur, which was found against the custom and tradition of the temple and was opposed by the temple priests, which led to stall the shoot. The makers planned to shift the shoot to Mysore, until the film team obtained permission from the Department of History and Archaeology for the shoot and resumed it. The film completed the shooting of major action episodes at the aluminum factory in Hyderabad on 21 April 2017. On 15 May 2017, it was announced that the principal shoot of the film got wrapped.

== Soundtrack ==
The film's music is composed by Devi Sri Prasad, who is collaborating with Harish Shankar for the second time and with Allu Arjun for the seventh time. The album consists of five tracks with Jonnavittula Ramalingeswara Rao, Sri Mani, Bhaskarabhatla, Sahithi and Balaji penning the lyrics.

On 3 May 2017, the first single of the film "DJ Saranam Bhaje Bhaje" was released through the YouTube channel of Aditya Music, the music label which bought the film's audio rights. The promo of the song "Gudilo Badilo Madilo Vodilo" was unveiled on 15 May, and two days later, on 17 May 2017, the full song was released and got wide reception. The film's audio was released on 21 May 2017, at Shilpakala Vedika in Hyderabad.

The song "Seeti Maar" was later re-mixed in Salman Khan's film Radhe.

== Release ==
The film's release was originally scheduled for 19 May 2017, but it was postponed to 30 June 2017, due to the delay in the film's production. In April 2017, a new release date was scheduled as 23 June 2017, coinciding with the Ramzan weekend. The theatrical rights of the film were sold to ₹77.3 crore (US$8.0 million). The film's dubbed versions were released in Malayalam, Tamil, Kannada, Hindi and Bengali.

== Reception ==
Duvvada Jagannadham film received positive response.

Sangeetha Devi Dundoo of The Hindu stated "The film could have been much more gripping but for being punctuated with a handful of songs, quite a few high-decibel ones at that. At 156 minutes, DJ is bloated and loses its tempo now and then. While some of the dialogues are fun, others make you cringe." She compared the film with S. Shankar directorial Gentleman where a Brahmin protagonist moonlights as a thief, steals from the rich and gives to the poor.

Srivatsan of India Today wrote that "We get the fact that the masala is very important for this genre. But the scenes that are supposed to leave you misty-eyed end up as comic relief. Jokes fall flat and the mass action blocks are not enough. At the same time, it's impossible to write off Allu Arjun. He's effective in bits; especially when the director wants him to dance and send goons into the air. Someone said that Allu Arjun's body is made of rubber and there can't be a better description. The problem with Duvvada Jagannadham is its half-baked story, which is everything we've seen in Allu Arjun's films earlier. To keep up with DJ's style, Duvvada Jagannadham is "Boring-ah, bore-asya, bore-obiah".

Sowmya Sruthi of The Times of India rated the film 3 out of 5 stars. Manoj Kumar R of The Indian Express rated the film 2.5 out of 5 stars and wrote "It is a commercial entertainer made by the book and it works to some extent". Hemanth Kumar of Firstpost gave 2.5 stars rating out of 5 and wrote that "The point is when you try making a new recipe, it’s not merely enough to have all the right ingredients. You’ve to know when to switch off the flame. In the end, when you think about this DJ, it just gets loud, louder, loudest. Thumbs down. But hey, Allu Arjun still dances like a dream!"

== Accolades ==
Award (Note: Awards, festivals and organizations are in alphabetical order.)	Date of ceremony (Note: Date is linked to the article about the awards held that year, wherever possible.)	Category	Recipient(s)	Result	Ref.
Zee Telugu Golden Awards	11 March 2017	Entertainer Of The Year (Female)	Pooja Hegde	Won	
Zee Telugu Golden Awards	11 March 2017	Favourite Heroine of the Year	Pooja Hegde	Won	
Filmfare Awards	16 June 2018	Best Music Director	Devi Sri Prasad	Nominated	
Radio City Cine Awards Telugu	2018	Best Female Playback Singer	K. S. Chitra for "Gudilo Badilo Madilo Vodilo"	Nominated	
