= Devi Sri Prasad =

Indian composer and singer

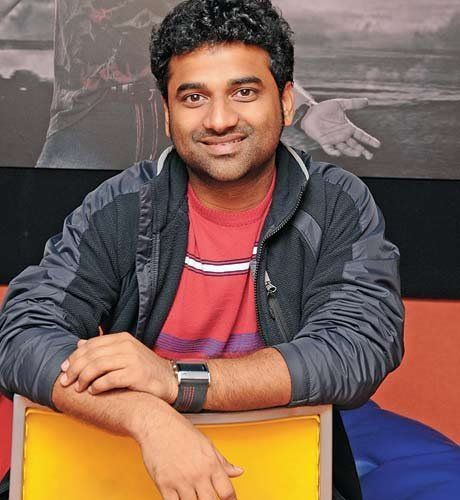

Background information
- Also known as: DSP
- Born: 2 August 1979 (age 47); Vedurupaka, Andhra Pradesh, India
- Genres: Film score; World music; Filmi
- Occupations: Music composer; singer; lyricist; performer; television presenter; record producer; dance choreographer; DSP
- Instruments: Vocals; keyboard; shehnai; piano; mandolin; harmonium; drums; guitar; violin
- Years active: 1997–present
- Labels: Aditya Music; Lahari Music; Sony Music India; T-Series; Zee Music Company; Panorama Music; Ayngaran Music Junglee Music; Think Music; Magnasound Records

Gorthi Devi Sri Prasad (2 August 1979), known by his stage name Devi Sri Prasad, or simply DSP, is an Indian music composer, singer, and lyricist primarily known for his work in Telugu cinema, along with Tamil and Hindi cinema. He has received numerous accolades, including a National Film Award, a Nandi Award, eleven Filmfare Awards, eight SIIMA Awards, and five CineMAA Awards.

Over his 25-year career, Devi Sri Prasad has worked on more than 100 films. He began his music career in 1997 by contributing to the studio album Dance Party. Prasad made his debut as a film composer at the age of 19 with the 1999 Telugu film Devi. His breakthrough in Telugu cinema came with the soundtrack of Anandam in 2001.

== Early and personal life ==
Devi Sri Prasad was born on 2 August 1979 in a Telugu family in Vedurupaka, East Godavari district, Andhra Pradesh. His father, G. Satyamurthy, was a screenwriter in Telugu cinema, who has penned popular films like Devatha, Khaidi No. 786, and Pedarayudu. His father hails from Vedurupaka. He is named after his maternal grandparents, Devi Meenakshi, and Prasada Rao. His younger brother Sagar is a playback singer, lyricist and dialogue writer.

== Career ==
=== Film score and soundtracks ===
==== 1999–2001: Career beginnings and breakthrough ====
In his debut music album Dance Party, he collaborated with veteran singer SP Balasubrahmanyam's son S. P. Charan. He then composed score and soundtrack of the 1999 Telugu film Devi, thus marking his debut as a film music composer at the age of 19.

Prasad made his breakthrough with the soundtrack album of the film Anandam in 2001, marking his first collaboration with director Srinu Vaitla. He has written and sung the song "Premante Emitante" and lent his vocals for another song titled "Monalisa". Idlebrain wrote, "music of the film is good though some of the tunes are inspired by 'back street boys' work. Background music is impressive. Devi Sri Prasad has got a chance to work with a fulltime love story, which has scope for good music". This is his first major successful film album. In the same year, he composed film score for a Tamil film Badri. This marks his debut in Tamil cinema.

==== 2002–2005: Rise to prominence ====
In 2002, he had five album releases, including soundtrack albums of the films Kalusukovalani, Manmadhudu and Sontham became the biggest chartbusters of the time. These films were critically and commercially successful, music composition by DSP also contributed to the films' successes. Films Sontham and Manmadhudu were regarded as musical hits of the year. Most of the songs in these albums were widely appreciated. A critic writing for Manmadhudu review, stated that "Music by Devi Sri Prasad is excellent. Even the background score is pretty good. The picturization of the songs has elevated the audio of Manmadhudu." The same year, Prasad composed music for a patriotic film Khadgam. Krishna Prasad Chigurupati of The Times of India wrote: " ‘Meme Indians’ composed by Devi Sri Prasad depicts the real attitude and unity among Indians with a hint of satire and humour." "Nuvvu Nuvvu" sung by Sumangali is another biggest hit of the album.

Although the film Varsham was released in 2004, its soundtrack album was released on 18 December 2003 through Aditya Music at the film's audio launch event at Annapurna Studios, Hyderabad. It is his second collaboration with producer M. S. Raju, who introduced him to the film industry through Devi in 1999. Prasad introduced his brother Gandham Sagar debut into the music industry by "Neeti Mulla" song of the album. The film was a huge hit at the box office. The soundtrack fetched him three awards, those include Santosham Best Music Director, CineMAA Awards Best Music Director and Filmfare Award for Best Music Director – Telugu. A critic described that he gave a perfect sound to the film and made a deep impact on the audiences with his soulful, melodious and romantic music. He continued his "romantic music" style in his next big hit Arya (2004). Prasad made his first collaboration with Sukumar, who his regular collaborator. The song "Aa Ante Amalapuram" enjoyed wide popularity in Telugu states and other parts of India. The six-track is considered the best of all time by a critic of The Times of India. Another critic from IndiaGlitz cited: "The man who should walk away with all the kudos is musician Devi Sri Prasad. He is at his inspirational best in the songs and in re-recording he is soothing as a cool juice in summer heat. The songs Nuvvante, Takadhimithom (Allu Arjun's dance add more weight age), Feel MY Love among the six numbers in the film stand out."

The next year, he composed the album of Tamil remake of Varsham – Mazhai. Prasad has eleven album releases in 2005 in both Telugu and Tamil, the highest number of releases in a single year till date. The soundtrack album of Nuvvostanante Nenoddantana which was released on 21 December 2004, made DSP one of the most prolific musicians in India. For the first time in his music career, Prasad remixed the song "Prema Kosamai Volalo" sung by Ghantasala for the 1951 film Pathala Bhairavi. A reviewer of Idlebrain.com felt DSP had his best outcome. He cited that "The songs might not sound great when you listen on stereo. But they are entirely different when captured on the screen amid situations. Songs do stand out in the film as the best. The re-recording and background score are terrific. There is rhythm, merriment, emotions upsurge and passion that flows throughout these songs. Songs in this film are a part of story narration." He composed film score and soundtrack for the action films Bhadra, Bunny and Aaru, which received decent success. Prasad made his breakthrough in Tamil with the film Sachein, which became successful both commercially and critically. The songs "Vaadi Vaadi", "Dai Dai Dai Kattikkoda", "Kanmoodi Thirakumbothu" and "Gundu Manga Thoppukkulle" of the soundtrack became chartbusters upon its release.

==== 2006–2009: Bommarillu, Jalsa ====
His next releases in 2006 were all romantic films. Of these, coming-of-age film Bommarillu was the biggest hit. The music of the film received positive response from critics. "Appudo Ippudo", "Nammaka Thappani" and "Bommani Geesthe" became chartbusters of the year. A critic from IndiaGlitz stated: "Bommani Geesthe is a quaint and quite folksy start. Something that Devi Sri Prasad hardly ever tries in recent times. After you listen to this, you would want him to try something similar again and again. His instrumentation, especially the violin ensemble, is in one word superb. The violin rendition of the film's theme in between is very beautiful. A good one in the album." It became one of the most sold Telugu music albums of the year. A repository of Indian songs has recommended the feel-good soundtracks to the audiences. Prasad composed a classic traditional-style music album for Pournami for the first time. The track "Bharata Vedamuga" helped DSP prove his classical talent as well. It was an evergreen chartbuster and is recognized as most fine works performed by Chitra, DSP, Sirivennala, and Charmi, as well. A critic writing an article titled 'Six best compositions of the music director' to The Times of India included soundtracks of the films Anandam, Kalusukovalani, Manmadhudu, Varsham, Nuvvostanante Nenoddantana and Arya. All these works made him to win further more accolades.

In 2007, four film were released with music composition by DSP. All the films were action comedy films and music by DSP got decent reviews from critics and audience. He made his second onscreen appearance alongside Chiranjeevi in the song "Good Morning Hyderabad" of the film Shankar Dada Zindabad directed by Prabhu Deva. The film is a sequel to his previously composed film Shankar Dada M.B.B.S. The next year Prasad made Kannada debut by composing score and soundtrack of the film Sangama. Jalsa directed by Trivikram Srinivas, was the hit of the year. It was launched on 29 February 2008 with DSP as the music director, marking his first collaboration with Trivikram Srinivas and Pawan Kalyan. "Gaallo Thelinattunde" and "My Heart is Beating" were chartbusters of the year in the soundtrack and was the highest selling Telugu album at the time of release. The audio rights were sold to Aditya Music for ₹ 9 million, the highest for any Telugu film at that point of time. A critic credited Prasad's music in the film as "peppy, youthful and incredibly fun filled." Prasad next composed film score for the action-thriller film Dasavathaaram starring Kamal Haasan and Asin, directed by K. S. Ravikumar. The film is one of the top grossers in India of the year. Himesh Reshammiya was first considered for the composition of film's score. Due to unavailability of his daily call sheets, Prasad was chosen to compose the score of the film.

The whole music has a symphonic feel. Since the music is orchestral, I have used a lot of voices. It took a month to work on the background score which was recorded in Chennai. Kamal Sir also asked me to compose the theme for the promo. It's a two and a half-minute piece. When we met for the promo, he even enacted the fight sequence of Dasavatharam for me. We discussed various films including "Sagaram Sangamam" and his relationship with K Vishwanath for over two hours.

— Devi Sri Prasad, Rediff.com

In 2009, he has five album releases. Prasad with his regular collaborator Sukumar, collaborated for the film Arya 2, which is spiritual sequel to his previous film Arya (2004). He also composed for the film's dubbed versions in Hindi, Malayalam and Tamil. The tracks "Ringa Ringa", "Uppenantha Prema" and "My Love Is Gone" topped the music charts. Although the film received mixed reviews, the song "Ringa Ringa" received a cult status. He received various nominations for his work. The song's music was re-used by Prasad in the 2011 Hindi film Ready due to its popularity. The same year Prasad got a decent hit in Tamil with the film Kanthaswamy. Prasad made Vikram to sing as many as four songs in the album. Pavithra Srinivasan of Rediff.com cited that "Kanthaswamy's music is not Devi Sri Prasad's best." The song "Excuse me, Mr. Kandasamy" been into a controversy after its release. Advocate V. Elango claimed that he had written five lines of the song. Finally, the controversy was over, after film's team won the case.

==== 2010–2014: Continued success ====
2010 was a major year for DSP in Tamil. Both of his albums in Tamil, Singam and Manmadan Ambu received huge response from both audience and critics. Of these, the soundtrack album of Singam received good response. A critic of Rediff.com wrote: "DSP has a reputation for sticking with his regulation format of tunes and here too, you can see it pop up at certain places but there's also a departure from the usual, mostly an influence of Haasan in both lyrics and music. Whatever the reason, the result is an album that provides you a treat. Go for it." Another critic praised Prasad's work and stated that "A westernized folk song, jazz, melodies, a poem and a kuthu...an album could not ask for more variety and DSP has delivered. The new experiments shows his maturity and his intention for being innovative." Prasad returned to his usual romantic-genre albums with 100% Love and Mr. Perfect in 2011. These were released under Aditya Music label. A critic wrote: "The duo, Sukumar – Devisri certainly knows the pulse of the urban youth and this album is yet another great attempt to grab the attention of the target audience. This ‘100% Love’ is 100% for the youth." Another critic cited that Devi Sri Prasad has excelled in the background score . A music reviewer felt about Mr. Perfect music album that DSP comes up with more soul stirring tunes and comes out of his stereotype beats and raps. Though there are those occasional flashes of brilliance, there is a repetitive mode seen in terms of the mixing and a constant background beat. Melody is missing in most of the songs and the focus is more on energy and peppy touch. Oosaravelli was another film released in the same year. A critic cited it as "definitely not DSP's best work" By the time Devi Sri Prasad became highest-paid musician in Tollywood.

He has four album releases in 2012, two action films Gabbar Singh and Julayi, one fantasy film Damarukam and a drama film Sarocharu. The six-track album of Julai was released on 6 July 2002, which became a chartbuster. In the UK, the BBC Asian Network radio station officially play listed the track "O Madhu" on 14 July 2012 marking it as the first Telugu song to be play listed there. He danced alongside Allu Arjun in a song of the album. Prasad received various awards and nominations for his work in the film Gabbar Singh. As the years pass, "Kevvu Keka" song received cult status. The song featuring Malaika Arora has huge popularity. A critic wrote that "DSP keeps the acoustics at the right level, like a seasoned engineer." Cheruku Raja of India Herald cited DSP on Sarocharu music album that "DSP's magical tunes are missing to core in the audio of this film." Critics gave mixed reviews for DSP's 50th film Damarukam. His composition of score was praised, but ten-track album got mixed response, except for few romance-styled songs.

Music album of three film which were released in 2014, were released in late-2013 and early-2014. These include Yevadu, 1: Nenokkadine and Mirchi. All these film were successful with music composed by DSP was well appreciated. Karthik Pasupulate of The Times of India ratedYevadu music 3/5 and stated: Music director Devi Sri Prasad has come up with an album that is high on beat and low on melody, but plays to the galleries unabashedly, blending multiple genres. Though there isn't one stand-out song, the album has an overriding happy vibe about it. The soundtrack album of Prasad's usual collaborator Sukumar-directed action thriller film 1: Nenokkadine was released at a promotional event at Shilpakala Vedika in Hyderabad. The event, watched by 14,500 people, was shown live in 24 theatres across Andhra Pradesh and Telangana and was the first Indian soundtrack release event shown live in theatres. His biggest hit of the year was Attarintiki Daredi (soundtrack), released on 19 July 2013. Prasad once again re-mixed an old folk song, "Kaatama Rayudu", earlier used in the 1940 film Sumangali whose tune was re-composed by V. Nagayya and lyrics were re-written by Samudrala Raghavacharya. It was sung by Pawan Kalyan. Prasad composed multi-genre songs in the album, a first in his career. A critic stated that "Attarintiki Daaredhi is that album which every Telugu film goer would expect from the hit combination of Pawan Kalyan, Devi Sri Prasad and Trivikram Srinivas. The album has melody, peppiness, and energizing factors which would definitely elevate the overall feel of the movie." He received further accolades for his music composition. The other two albums that performed well in the same year were Iddarammayilatho and Singam II. A critic of The Times of India cited "DSP gets a foot-tapping album in Singam 2, though it sounds uncomfortably very similar to Singam." "Top Lechipoddi" from Iddarammayilatho was the biggest hit among the songs released that year It is one of the most streamed Telugu songs. In 2014, Prasad reclaimed success in Tamil with the film Veeram. Alludu Seenu was another successful album in the year. The soundtrack album had a record number of sales for which Aditya Music thanked Devi Sri Prasad and the film makers, one of the representatives from the company stated that "Devi Sri Prasad, who has given many super hit albums in his career, has provided beautiful songs for Alludu Seenu and it has been creating sensation regarding sales, from the day it was released."

==== 2015–2018: Rangasthalam and versatility ====
2015 was a mixed-musical year for DSP. Because he received both positive and negative reviews from critics. Kumari 21F and Nenu Sailaja was regarded as "musical hits" of the year, although these films received a good response. A critic felt that the Kumari 21F album on the whole falls desperately short of the standards that one would expect from DSP. "Meghaalu Lekunna" was recorded using a live orchestra, which Nisar found "rare these days". 123Telugu.com wrote about Nenu Sailaja album that "DSP has provided some feel good music which will gel with the flow of the love story in this family entertainer. The lyricists did a splendid job of bringing emotions out of every song. Crazy feeling, Sailaja Sailaja, Em Cheppanu are pretty good and will go well with all sections." The film score and soundtrack of fantasy-adventure film Puli was composed by collaborating with Vijay for the third time after Sachein (2005) and Villu (2009). The film performed poorly at the box office and also got negative reviews. The film score was praised but the soundtrack was criticized. A critic stated: "Puli's music will need the grand visuals as it is programmed keeping in mind what's going to come onscreen." Indiaglitz's critic wrote that the album in all is racy but only in parts. the energy, which is typical of DSP seems to have dipped in his snoopiness for the choice of instruments, orchestrina of genres, and classic melodies. DSP was highly credited for composing music for Srimanthudu and S/O Satyamurthy, two of the highest-grossing films of the year. He received various accolades for the composition of score and soundtrack and singing.

Prasad next collaborated with Sukumar for the film Nannaku Prematho in 2016 for the fifth time. After the death of Satyamurthy, Prasad's father, the album was dedicated to the former in an audio launch ceremony on 27 December 2015. Critics cited the album as "a fun album with ample dose of trendy as well as mass numbers with a tinge of experimentation", "It is not vintage DSP at his best" and "different album from the crazy combo." The same year he had another big release Janatha Garage, which received good response from audience and critics. Sardaar Gabbar Singh, an action comedy film didn't receive much praise. He remixed a popular song "Naa Koka Baagunda" from the Chiranjeevi-starrer Kondaveeti Raja (1986) for this film. Devi had eight album releases in 2017, out of which Khaidi No. 150 and DJ: Duvvada Jagannadham were successful. Songs such as "Ammadu Let's Do Kummudu", "Ratthalu" and "Seeti Maar" were the biggest hits from the two albums. A. Kameshwari of The Indian Express stated: "DJ-Duvvada Jaggannadham's jukebox stands up to all kinds of expectations Allu Arjun's fans must have had from the hit duo." Jai Lava Kusa, is another film that received good response for music. A critic from Firstpost wrote that "Devi Sri Prasad does a brilliant job at composing tracks for the Raavana-inspired portrayal in the movie. In almost three songs, we have the theme screaming out. The album leaves us wishing for a romantic track, but on a deeper analysis of the album of Jai Lava Kusa, it seems like this was a conscious choice by the makers to stick to the beats."

The year 2018 is one of the major ones for Prasad. Rangasthalam received wide recognition and praise from audience and critics. The album has some of the most popular Telugu songs such as "Rangamma Mangamma" and "Jigelu Rani". The film is a periodical-styled, so Prasad's unusual folk-traditional-classic-style album received huge praise. A critic of Firstpost wrote: "Every song on this album is tailor-made for the movie set in a village and captures rural essence at its best. The album is also an instant reminder of many Telugu shows like Rasamayi Daruvu." Another critic cited Devi Sri Prasad as the other hero of Rangasthalam. Priyanka Sundar of Hindustan Times stated that "In essence, Rangasthalam album is rustic." Prasad received various accolades for his work in the film. Saamy² is his last Tamil film till now. The film is flagged as a box-office bomb. The other two releases Bharat Ane Nenu and Hello Guru Prema Kosame were also good musical hits, but received mixed reviews. Actor Farhan Akhtar was made to sing "I Don't Know" in the album Bharat Ane Nenu.

==== 2019–present: Brief setback, Pushpa and recent work ====
In 2019, Prasad had four releases. All of them were decent hits. Suresh Kavirayani of Deccan Chronicle stated that DSP's songs are the high points of the film Chitralahari. Another critic writing for music review of Maharshi, said that "OST of Maharshi is good for a one-time listen with most of the numbers sounding situational; they might work better when seen on-screen."Score of F2: Fun and Frustration received good praise. Prasad had only one release in 2020, i.e., Sarileru Neekevvaru. He collaborated with director Anil Ravipudi after F2: Fun and Frustration. "Mind Block" and "He's So Cute" songs from the album got good response from audience. However, it received negative reviews from critics for his and quoted them as routine compositions. IndiaGlitz's reviewer wrote: "The album is not exactly DSP being on fire. But it surely has its big moments." Another critic of Gulf News said that the music of the film not too great.

After a brief setback, he reclaimed success through the soundtrack album and score of the film Uppena (2021). The film is regarded as a "musical hit" Most of the songs in the soundtrack were successful. "Nee Kannu Neeli Samudram" and "Jala Jala Jalapaatham Nuvvu" were the biggest hits of the album and also been in the top spots in the national music charts. A critic wrote: "One of the biggest plus points of the film is Devi Sri Prasad's splendid music. It holds the narration in a big way. Every song is superbly composed and shot well." Jeevi of Idlebrain.com stated that "Devi Sri Prasad deserves a huge pat for his outstanding music for the songs in this film." The same year, Pushpa: The Rise was released. The soundtrack featured five tracks titled "Daakko Daakko Meka", "Srivalli", "Oo Antava Oo Oo Antava", "Saami Saami" and "Eyy Bidda Idhi Naa Adda". The soundtrack experienced large amounts of commercial success, with the music being one of the major reasons for the success of the film. Prasad got widespread recognition and received his first National Film Award alongside many other accolades.

Despite the success from Pushpa: The Rise, Prasad's consecutive works such as Rowdy Boys (2022), Khiladi (2022), Drishyam 2 (2022), Waltair Veerayya (2023) and Rathnam (2024) didn't perform well. Although some of the films were commercially successful at the box-office, the songs and music didn't perform performed and average reception from critics.

=== Playback singing and songwriting ===
Prasad is also a noted playback singer. He has sung 66 songs in a span of 20 years in Telugu, Tamil and Hindi languages. He sung mostly in his own compositions. He lent his vocals for the first time in 2000 for the song "Vechavechaga" which was written by him for the film album Vamsi, composed by Mani Sharma. The next year he sang four songs, two Telugu and two Tamil. The same year, Devi made his debut in Kollywood and Tamil music by lending his vocals for two songs "Angel Vandhaale" and "King of Chennai" from the film album Badri, composed by Ramana Gogula.

Film songs such as "Tellarindoi", "Kanthasamy", "Rakhi Rakhi", "Mr. Perfect", "A square B square", "Ninnu Chudagane", "Super Machi", "Singam", "Nannaku Prematho", "Ammadu Let's Do Kummudu" and "Yentha Sakkagunnave" are his popular ones. Few of them were written by himself. DSP sang a devotional song in the 2006 film Sri Ramadasu, composed by M. M. Keeravani. He collaborated with actress Swathi Reddy for the song "A square B square" in the 2011 film 100% Love. He dedicated the song "Nannaku Prematho" for his late father. He performed the song along with his brother Sagar.

Prasad sang a Hindi song "Daddy Mummy" for the 2015 film Bhaag Johnny. It was re-composed by himself from his previous song "Akalesthey" from Shankar Dada Zindabad. Prasad re-composed and re-mixed many of his own songs in other languages in Tamil, Telugu and Hindi. The last one to be re-composed and re-mixed is "Seeti Maar", for the 2021 Hindi film Radhe, from the 2017 soundtrack album DJ: Duvvada Jagannadham. He also sang a Kannada song "Dil Maange More" from his own composed film Sangama.

DSP had written over 25 songs in Telugu and Tamil. Most of these songs were either sung by him or composed by him.

=== Other work ===
Devi Sri Prasad made his first live performance outside India on 26 July 2008, at Chicago, U.S. He announced his first concert tour on 14 June 2014. The next day, at a private event, he announced that the concert will be held from 4 July 2014 to 2 August 2014 across various cities of the United States and Canada. The concert featured music performances of Sagar, Neha Bhasin, Rita Thyagarajan, Ranina Reddy, Malathy Lakshman and Sooraj Santhosh and few dance performances by several local American artists. It was concluded on 2 August 2014 at Prudential Center, New Jersey.

Since then, Prasad performed at various concerts across the world, especially in the United States. His 2016 concert tour in the U.S. received wide response and was telecasted on Zee Telugu. Devi Sri Prasad made a music tribute in 2014, to the legendary singer Michael Jackson on his birth anniversary with a special track from his album Jalsa.

Devi Sri Prasad was supposed to make his acting debut. In 2019, it is reported that Sukumar will be writing the story, produced by Dil Raju. But as of now, there is no official announcement due to few production issues. Devi made his television debut as a judge in 2021 with the Tamil reality-singing show Rockstar, which premiered on Zee Tamil on 28 March 2021. Although, DSP appeared in various other shows in Telugu and Tamil languages, this is his first major one [as a judge]. In 2015, he choreographed the music video of the song "Bang Bang Bangkok" from his soundtrack film album Kumari 21F. Additionally, Devi Prasad choreographed a song in the 2015 film Kumari 21F.

== Music style and impact ==
Devi Sri Prasad is known for composing iconic item numbers in Telugu films. Since the 2000s, production of item numbers seen a steady rise, of them, Devi has composed majority. "Ringa Ringa", "Jigelu Rani", "Aa Ante Amalapuram", "Pakka Local", "Swing Zara", "Kevvu Keka", "Aakalesthe Annam Pedatha", "Naa Pere Kanchanamala", and "Oo Antava Oo Oo Antava" are some of his popular compositions. Due to their popularity, he is referred as "king of item numbers" and most of his re-mixed songs in Tamil and Hindi, were item numbers. He collaborated with director Sukumar in nine films.

Besides item numbers, his music style is characterized as romantic melody, pop rock, hard rock and folk. Priyanka Sundar of The Indian Express listed "Mellaga Karagani", "Ghal Ghal", "Violin Song" and "Gudilo Badilo Madilo Vodilo" in her article Five songs by DSP that has redefined romance in Tollywood. Devi is the first music director to initiate in putting up names of background singers in his albums.

Devi frequently admits that Ilaiyaraaja's music and Michael Jackson's style of performance are his biggest influences.

== Media image ==
Due to his energetic music beats and energetic stage performances, Devi Sri Prasad is dubbed as the "Rockstar" or "Rockstar DSP" in the media. Devi was honoured by the U.S. state of Illinois, where the governor Pat Quinn declared 26 July 2014 as "Devi Sri Prasad Day", while he was performing at Now Arena, Illinois, as part of his international debut concert tour. He is the highest-paid Telugu musician.

== Filmography ==
=== Film ===
Year	Film	Role	Language	Notes
2002	Lahiri Lahiri Lahirilo	—N/a	Telugu	Dubbing artist for Aditya Om
2004	Shankar Dada MBBS	Himself	Telugu	Special appearance in the songs "Chaila Chaila" and "Sande Poddu"
2007	Shankar Dada Zindabad	Himself	Telugu	Special appearance in the song "Good Morning Hyderabad"
2010	Manmadhan Ambu	Himself	Tamil	Special appearance in the song "Neela Vaanam"
2011	Vedi	Himself	Tamil	Special appearance in the song "Kadhalikka Pennoruthi"
2012	Julayi	Himself	Telugu	Special appearance in the song "Pakdo Pakdo"
2013	Attarintiki Daredi	Himself	Telugu	Special appearance in the song "Ninnu Chudagane"
2015	Bhaag Johnny	Himself	Hindi	Special appearance in the song "Daddy Mummy"
2017	Khaidi No. 150	Himself	Telugu	Special appearance in the song "Ammadu Let's Do Kummudu"
2020	Sarileru Neekevvaru	Himself	Telugu	Special appearance in the song "Mind Block"
2024	Mr. Bachchan	Himself	Telugu	Special appearance in the song "Nallanchu Thellacheera"
TBA	Yellamma †	TBA	Telugu	Debut as Lead Actor

=== Television ===
Year	Show	Role	Language	Network	Notes	Ref.
2007	Padutha Theeyaga	Guest judge	Telugu	ETV	2 episodes; guest judge along with S. P. Balasubrahmanyam	
2013	Jhummandi Naadam	Guest	Telugu	ETV	2 episodes; performed few songs	
2017	Music Cafe	Himself	Tamil	Jaya TV	Performed few songs on the occasion of Puthandu	
2017	Bigg Boss 1	Himself	Telugu	Star Maa	Performed on the grand finale.	
2021	Rockstar	Judge	Tamil	Zee Tamil	Primary judge	
2022	Bigg Boss 6	Guest	Telugu	Star Maa	Released O Pilla song on Day 35.	
