= List of Telugu films of 2019 =

This is a list of Telugu films released in the year 2019.

== Box office collection ==
The List of highest-grossing Telugu films released in 2019, by worldwide box office gross revenue, are as follows.

Highest worldwide gross of 2019
Rank	Title	Production company	Worldwide gross	Ref
1	Saaho	UV Creations; T-Series	₹434–439 crore	(Note: Saaho's reported worldwide grosses vary between ₹434 crore (Deccan Herald) – ₹439 crore (India Today))
2	Sye Raa Narasimha Reddy	Konidela Production Company	₹240.6 crore (US$25 million)	
3	Maharshi	Sri Venkateswara Creations; Vyjayanthi Movies; PVP Cinema	₹200 crore (US$21 million)	
4	F2: Fun and Frustration	Sri Venkateswara Creations	₹129.2 crore (US$13 million)	
5	Vinaya Vidheya Rama	DVV Entertainments	₹94 crore (US$9.8 million)	
6	iSmart Shankar	People's Media Factory; Mama Jagannadh Touring Talkies	₹78−85 crore (US$−8.8 million)	
7	Majili	Shine Screens	₹70 crore (US$7.3 million)	
8	Venky Mama	Suresh Productions	₹72 crore (US$7.5 million)	
9	Prati Roju Pandage	UV Creation GA2 Pictures	₹65 crore (US$6.7 million)	
10	Jersey	Sithara Entertainments	₹52 crore (US$5.4 million)	

== January – June ==
Opening		Title	Director	Cast	Production	Ref
J A N	4	Ajay Passayyad	Prem Deepak	Aman Singh, Jhansi, Sivannarayana	Bharatam Creations	
J A N	4	Natana	Bharathi Babu	Mahidar, Sravya Rao, Raghu Babu, Prabhas Sreenu	Sree Kubhera Art Creations	
J A N	9	N.T.R: Kathanayakudu	Krish	Nandamuri Balakrishna; Vidya Balan; Rana Daggubati; Sumanth; Rakul Preet Singh; Nithya Menen; Hansika Motwani	NBK Films; Vaaraahi Chalana Chitram; Vibri Media	
J A N	11	Vinaya Vidheya Rama	Boyapati Srinu	Ram Charan, Vivek Oberoi, Kiara Advani, Prashanth, Sneha	DVV Entertainment	
J A N	12	F2: Fun and Frustration	Anil Ravipudi	Venkatesh, Varun Tej, Tamannaah Bhatia, Mehreen Pirzada, Prakash Raj, Nassar, Rajendra Prasad, Vennela Kishore	Sri Venkateswara Creations	
J A N	25	Kothaga Maa Prayanam	Ramana Mogili	Yamini Bhaskar, Priyanth, Bhanu, Karunya Chowdhary, Jeeva, Giridhar	Srinidhi Studios	
J A N	25	Mr. Majnu	Venky Atluri	Akhil Akkineni; Nidhhi Agerwal; Izabelle Leite; Kailash Reddy; Raja Chembolu; Naga Babu; Subbaraju; Rao Ramesh; Jayaprakash; Ajay	Sri Venkateswara Cine Chitra	
F E B	1	Akkadokaduntadu	Sri Paada Viswak	Siva Kantamaneni, Ram Karthik, Vinod Kumar Alva, Ravi Babu	LightHouse Cine Magic	
F E B	1	Bichagada Majaka	K. S. Nageswara Rao	Arjun Reddy, Neha Deshpande, Suman, Babu Mohan	Variety Movie Makers	
F E B	1	Gamer	Rajesh Tadakala	Sraneeth Raj, Kalyani Patel		
F E B	1	Sakala Kala Vallabhudu	Siva Ganesh	Tanishq Reddy, Meghla Muktha, Suman, Jeeva	Simha Films	
F E B	8	Yatra	Mahi V. Raghav	Mammootty, Suhasini Maniratnam, Jagapathi Babu	70mm Entertainments	
F E B	22	4 Letters	R. Raghuraj	Eeshwar, Tuya Chakraborthy, Posani Krishna Murali, Anikitha Maharaana	Om Sri Chakra Creations	
F E B	22	Mithai	Prashant Kumar	Priyadarshi Pullikonda, Kamal Kamaraju, Swetaa Verma, Gayatri Gupta	Red Ants Cinema	
F E B	22	N.T.R: Mahanayakudu	Krish	Nandamuri Balakrishna, Vidya Balan, Rana Daggubati	NBK Films; Vaaraahi Chalana Chitram; Vibri Media	
F E B	22	Prementha Panichese Narayana	Jonnalagadda Srinivasa Rao	Harikrishna Jonnalagadda, Akshitha, Jhansi	JSR Movies	
M A R	1	Akkadokaduntadu	Sri Paada Viswaak	Ram Karthik, Vinod Kumar Alva, Ravi Babu, Alekhaaya, Siva Harish	Light House Cine Magic	
M A R	1	Crazy Crazy Feeling	Sanjai Kartik	Viswant Duddumpudi, Palak Lalwani	Vignatha Films	
M A R	1	118	K. V. Guhan	Kalyan Ram, Nivetha Thomas, Shalini Pandey	East Coast Production	
M A R	13	Eureka	Karteek Anand	Karteek Anand, Dimple Hayathi		
M A R	15	Aa Nimisham	Kala Rajesh	Prasad Reddy, Ranisree	Venkateswara Digital Movies	
M A R	15	Ashok Reddy	Nandi Venkat Reddy	Rajanikanthi Kathi, Rambhaa	L. V. Creative Entertainments	
M A R	15	Bilalpur Police Station	Naga Sai Makham	Srinath Maganti, Saanvie Meghana, Goreti Venkanna, R. S. Nanda	M. S. Creations	
M A R	15	College Poragallu	Annam Chandrashekar	Mallikarjun, Kavitha Mahato	Manthra Arts	
M A R	15	Jessie	Ashwani Kumar. V	Abhinav Gomatam, Abhishek Maharshi, Ashima Narwal	Ekaa Art Productions	
M A R	15	Magnet	Adishesha Sai Reddy	Sakshi Chowdhary, Posani Krishna Murali, Jabardasth Srinu, Akshitha	Lord Shiva Creations	
M A R	15	Manasa Vaacha	M. V. Prasad	Tejas, Karishna Karpal, Seema Parmar	Ganesh Creations	
M A R	15	Pranam Khareedu	P. L. K. Reddy	Prashanth, Avantika, Taraka Ratna	S. N. Creations	
M A R	15	Where Is the Venkatalakshmi	Kishore Kumar	Raai Laxmi, Pujita Ponnada, Ram Karthik, Praveen, Brahmaji, Madhunandan	ABT Creations	
M A R	15	Mouname Ishtam	Ashok Koralath	Ram Karthik; Parvathy Arun; Abhay Bethiganti	A K Movies	
M A R	21	Prematho Cheppana	Ranga Ravinder Gupta	Udaytej, Bhanu Sri Mehra		
M A R	22	Adhrushyam	Ravi Prakash Krishnamsetty	Jaan, Angana Roy, Kalpana, Jabardasth Appa Rao, R. P. Vinod		
M A R	22	Cheddi Gang	Kanagala Ramesh Chowdhary	Srinivasa Reddy, Devan, Baburaj	Raj Productions International	
M A R	22	Vinara Sodara Veera Kumara	Sateesh Chandra Nadella	Srinivas Sai, Priyanka Jain, Uttej, Jhansi	Sithara Entertainments	
M A R	29	Lakshmi's NTR	Ram Gopal Varma; Agasthya Manju	P. Vijay Kumar, Yagna Shetty, Sritej	A Company Production	
M A R	29	Suryakantham	Pranith Bramandapally	Niharika Konidela, Rahul Vijay, Shivaji Raja, Suhasini Maniratnam		
A P R	5	Majili	Shiva Nirvana	Naga Chaitanya Akkineni, Samantha Akkineni, Divyansha Kaushik, Subbaraju, Rao Ramesh, Atul Kulkarni, Posani Krishna Murali	Shine Screens	
A P R	6	Prema Katha Chitram 2	Hari Krishna	Sumanth Ashwin, Nandita Swetha		
A P R	12	Chitralahari	Kishore Tirumala	Sai Dharam Tej, Kalyani Priyadarshan, Nivetha Pethuraj, Sunil, Vennela Kishore, Posani Krishna Murali, Brahmaji	Mythri Movie Makers	
A P R	12	Runam	Srinivas Gundareddy	Gopi Krishna, Priyanka Augustine, Mahendar, Shilpa	Bestwin Production	
A P R	19	Jersey	Gowtam Tinnanuri	Nani, Shraddha Srinath, Sathyaraj, Sampath Raj, Harish Kalyan, Viswant	Sithara Entertainments	
A P R	21	Chikati Gadilo Chithakotudu	Santhosh P. Jayakumar	Adith Arun, Bhagyashree Mote, Sayantani Guhathakurta, Nikki Tamboli, Posani Krishna Murali, Rajendran	Blue Ghost Pictures	
A P R	26	Danger Love Story	Shekar Chandra	Khayyum Gaurav, Adia, Madhulagna Das, Jabardasth Appa Rao	Laxmi Kanaka Varshini Creations	
A P R	26	Diksoochi	Dilip Kumar Salvadi	Dilip Kumar Salvadi, Chandni Bhagwanani, Sammeta Gandhi, Chatrapathi Sekhar	SRS Associates Private Limited	
A P R	26	Duppatlo Minnagu	Yandamuri Veerendranath	Naveen Thirthahalli, Chirashree Anchan	Chiranjeevi Films	
M A Y	3	Nuvvu Thopu Raa	B. Harinath Babu	Sudhakar Komakula, Nithya Shetty, Nirosha	United Films	
M A Y	3	Okate Life	M. Venkat	Ramesh Choudary, Shruti Yugal, Suman, Nalla Venu	Lord Venkateswara Films	
M A Y	3	Rangu Paduddi	S. Shyam Prasad	Ali, Raghu Babu, Dhanraj, Suman Shetty	Manisha Arts and Media Pvt Ltd	
M A Y	9	Maharshi	Vamsi Paidipally	Mahesh Babu, Pooja Hegde, Allari Naresh, Jagapathi Babu, Prakash Raj	Sri Venkateswara Creations, Vyjayanthi Movies, PVP Cinema	
M A Y	17	ABCD: American Born Confused Desi	Sanjeev Reddy	Allu Sirish, Rukshar Dhillon, Nagendra Babu, Master Bharath, Kota Srinivasa Rao	Suresh Productions, Madhura Entertainment	
M A Y	17	Enthavaraalaina	Guru Chindepalli	Advaith, Zaheeda Syam	Ramadhootha Arts	
M A Y	17	Romantic Criminals	P. Sunil Kumar Reddy	Manoj Nandam, Avantika Munni, Divya Vijju, K. Vinay	Sravya Films	
M A Y	17	Swayamvadha	Vivek Varma	Aditya Alluri, Anika Rao, Dhanraj, Posani Krishna Murali	Lakshmi Chalana Chitra	
M A Y	24	Sita	Teja	Kajal Aggarwal, Bellamkonda Sreenivas, Sonu Sood	Sri Sravanthi Movies	
M A Y	31	Abhinetri 2	A. L. Vijay	Prabhu Deva, Tamannaah, Nandita Swetha, Dimple Hayathi	Abhishek Pictures; Trident Arts	
M A Y	31	December 31	G. Kondal Rao	Navakanth, Seetha, Saptagiri, Nutan Prasad, Posani Krishna Murali	Sri Goutham Creations	
M A Y	31	Falaknuma Das	Vishwak Sen	Vishwak Sen, Saloni Mishra, Harshita Gaur, Prashanthi Charuolingah, Tharun Bhascker Dhaassyam, Abhinav Gomatam	Vanmaye Creations; Vishwak Sen Cinemas; Terranova Pictures; Media9 Creative Works	
J U N	5	Seven	Nizar Shafi	Havish, Nandita Swetha, Rahman, Regina Cassandra, Anisha Ambrose	Kiran Studios	
J U N	6	Hippi	Krishna	Kartikeya Gummakonda, Digangana Suryavanshi, J. D. Chakravarthy, Brahmaji, Vennela Kishore	V Creations	
J U N	14	Ek	Sampath V. Rudra	Bishnu Adhikari, Abhinav Sardar, Aparna Sharma, Himanshi Khurana, Suman	K World	
J U N	14	Game Over	Ashwin Saravanan	Taapsee Pannu, Vinodhini Vaidyanathan, Anish Kuruvilla, Sanchana Natarajan	YNOT Studios; Reliance Entertainment	
J U N	14	Vajra Kavachadhara Govinda	Arun Pawar	Saptagiri, Vaibhavi Joshi, Veda Sastry, Jabardasth Srinu	Siva Sivam Films	
J U N	14	Viswamitra	Raajkiran	Prasanna, Nanditha Raj, Ashutosh Rana, Satyam Rajesh	Raaja Kiran Cinemas; Madhuram Movie Kreations	
J U N	21	1st Rank Raju	Naresh Kumar H. N.	Chethan Maddineni, Kashish Vohra, Prakash Raj, Vennela Kishore, Naresh	Dolphin Entertainment	
J U N	21	Agent Sai Srinivasa Athreya	Swaroop RSJ	Naveen Polishetty, Shruthi Sharma, Appaji Ambarisha Darbha	Swadharm Entertainment	
J U N	21	Mallesham	Raj. R	Priyadarshi Pulikonda, Ananya Nagalla, Ananda Chakrapani, Jagadish Pratap Bhandari	Studio 99 & Suresh Productions	
J U N	21	Special – The Story of a Mind Reader	Vastav	Ajay, Ranga, Akshatha, Jabardasth Appa Rao	Nandalal Creations	
J U N	21	Voter	G. S. Karthik	Manchu Vishnu, Surabhi, Sampath Raj, Jayaprakash, Nassar, Posani Krishna Murali	Rama Reels	
J U N	28	Brochevarevarura	Vivek Athreya	Sree Vishnu, Rahul Ramakrishna, Nivetha Thomas, Satyadev, Priyadarshi Pulikonda	Manyam Productions	
J U N	28	Captain Rana Prathap	Haranath Policherla	Haranath Policherla, Puneet Issar, Nishi Gandha	Dream Team	
J U N	28	Kalki	Prasanth Varma	Dr. Rajasekhar, Nandita Swetha, Adah Sharma, Pujita Ponnada, Rahul Ramakrishna, Nassar, Ashutosh Rana	Happy Movies	
J U N	28	Prema Janta	Nikhilesh Thogari	Ram Praneeth, Sumaya, Uttej	Sun Wood Entertainment	

== July–December ==
Opening		Title	Director	Cast	Production House	Ref
J U L	5	Burrakatha	Diamond Ratna Babu	Aadi Saikumar, Mishti, Rajendra Prasad, Abhimanyu Singh	Deepala Arts	
J U L	5	Kakatheeyudu	Vijay Samudra	Taraka Ratna, Yamini, Chippy, Vinod Kumar Alva	Sri LVR Productions	
J U L	5	Oh! Baby	B. V. Nandini Reddy	Samantha Akkineni, Naga Shaurya, Rajendra Prasad, Lakshmi, Urvashi	Suresh Productions, People's Media Factory Guru Films, Kross Pictures	
J U L	5	Durmargudu	Suneeth Jampa	Zaara Khan, Vijay Krishna, Racha Ravi, Jabardast Murali.	AMURUTHA MOVIE CREATIONS	
J U L	12	Dorasaani	K. V. R. Mahendra	Anand Devarakonda, Shivatmika Rajashekar, Kishore, Vinay Varma	Madhura Entertainments	
J U L	12	KS100	Sher	Sameer Khan, Shraddha Sharma, Sunita Pandey	Chandrashekara Movies	
J U L	12	Ninu Veedani Needanu Nene	Caarthick Raju	Sundeep Kishan, Anya Singh, Pragathi, Vennela Kishore, Murali Sharma	Venkatadari Talkies, AK Entertainments	
J U L	12	Marketlo Prajaswamyam	R. Narayana Murthy	R. Narayana Murthy, Madhavi	Sneha Chitra Pictures	
J U L	12	Rajdooth	Arjun Gunnala, Cartyk	Meghamsh Srihari, Nakshatra, Ravi Varma, Kota Srinivasa Rao, Manobala	Raj Kiran Cinemas	
J U L	18	iSmart Shankar	Puri Jagannadh	Ram Pothineni, Nidhhi Agerwal, Nabha Natesh, Puneet Issar, Satyadev, Ashish Vidyarthi, Shayaji Shinde	Puri Jagannadh Touring Talkies	
J U L	26	Dear Comrade	Bharat Kamma	Vijay Devarakonda, Rashmika Mandanna, Shruti Ramachandran	Mythri Movie Makers	
J U L	26	Nenu Lenu	Ram Kumar A.S.K	Harshith Koditham, Sri Padma	OSM Vision	
J U L	27	Bailampudi	Anil Raj	Harish Vinay, Tanishq Tiwari	Tara Creations	
A U G	2	Guna 369	Arjun Jandhyala	Kartikeya Gummakonda, Anagha, Adhitya, Shivaji Raja	SG Movie Makers	
A U G	2	Rakshasudu	Ramesh Varma	Bellamkonda Sreenivas, Anupama Parameswaran	A Studio	
A U G	2	Sivaranjani	Naaga Prabhakkar	Rashmi Gautham, Nandu, Nandini Rai, Akhil Karthik, Dhanraj, Delhi Rajeshwari	U&I Entertainments	
A U G	9	Kathanam	Rajesh Nadendla	Anasuya Bharadwaj, Srinivas Avasarala, Vennela Kishore	The Manthra Entertainment	
A U G	9	Manmadhudu 2	Rahul Ravindran	Nagarjuna, Rakul Preet Singh	Annapurna Studios, Anandi Art Creations, Viacom18 Motion Pictures	
A U G	10	Kobbari Matta	Rupak Ronaldson	Sampoornesh Babu, Ishika Singh, Gayatri Gupta	OAK Entertainments	
A U G	15	Evaru	Venkat Ramji	Adivi Sesh, Regina Cassandra, Naveen Chandra, Murali Sharma	PVP Cinemas	
A U G	15	Ranarangam	Sudheer Varma	Sharwanand, Kajal Aggarwal, Kalyani Priyadarshan	Sithara Entertainments, Harrika and Hassine Creations	
A U G	23	Boy	Amar Viswaraj	Lakshya Sinha, Sahithi, Vinay Varma	Viswaraj Creations	
A U G	23	Edaina Jaragocchu	K. Rama Kanth	Bobby Simha, Sasha Singh, Ajay Ghosh, Vijay Raja	Sri Lakshmi Narasimha Productions	
A U G	23	Kousalya Krishnamurthy	Bhimaneni Srinivasa Rao	Aishwarya Rajesh, Rajendra Prasad, Karthik Raju	Creative Commercials	
A U G	23	Hawaa	Mahesh Reddy	Chaitanya Rao Madadi, Divi Prasanna, Phoebe Jakober, Kamal Krishna	Film and Reel	
A U G	23	Nene Kedi No.1	Johni	Shakalaka Shankar, Khushi Gadhvi, Gurleen Chopra, Mukul Dev	A. R Entertainments Movies	
A U G	30	Saaho	Sujeeth	Prabhas, Shraddha Kapoor, Neil Nitin Mukesh, Arun Vijay, Jackie Shroff, Chunky Pandey, Mahesh Manjrekar, Lal, Mandira Bedi, Murali Sharma, Vennela Kishore, Evelyn Sharma, Supreeth	UV Creations; T-Series; Yash Raj Films	
S E P	06	Jodi	Viswanath Arigella	Aadi Saikumar, Shraddha Srinath	Bhavana Creations	
S E P	13	Nani's Gang Leader	Vikram Kumar	Nani, Priyanka Mohan, Kartikeya Gummakonda, Lakshmi, Saranya Ponvannan	Mythri Movie Makers	
S E P	13	Marshal	Jai Raaja Singh	Abhay Adaka, Srikanth, Megha Chowdhury	AVL Productions	
S E P	20	Gaddalakonda Ganesh	Harish Shankar	Varun Tej, Atharvaa, Pooja Hegde, Mirnalini Ravi	14 Reels Plus	
S E P	20	Nenu Naa Nagarjuna	R. B. Gopal	Mahesh Achanta, Somi Verma, Suman Shetty	G.N.R.Creations	
S E P	21	Pandugadi Photo Studio	Dileep Raj	Ali, Babu Mohan, Bhavya Sri, Jeeva	Sri Venkateswara Vidyalayam's	
S E P	27	Rama Chakkani Seetha	Sriharsha Manda	Indhra, Sukrutha Wagle, Ravi Babu, Rahul Sipligunj		
S E P	27	Rayalaseema Love Story	Ram Ranadheer	Venkat, Pavani, Hrishali		
S E P	27	Ninnu Thalachi	Anil Thota	Vamsi Yakasiri, Stefy Patel	SLN Productions; Nedurumalli Productions	
O C T	2	Sye Raa Narasimha Reddy	Surender Reddy	Chiranjeevi, Nayanthara, Tamannaah, Jagapati Babu, Sudeep, Vijay Sethupathi	Konidela Production Company	
O C T	5	Chanakya	Thiru	Gopichand, Mehreen Pirzada, Zareen Khan, Rajesh Khattar	AK Entertainments	
O C T	5	Oorantha Anukuntunnaru	Balaji	Srinivas Avasarala, Nawin Vijaya Krishna, Megha Chowdhury, Sophiya Singh	Rowaskair Entertainments	
O C T	8	Evvarikee Cheppoddu	Basava Shanker	Rakesh Varre, Gargeyi Yellapragada, Vamsi Nakkanti	Crazy Ants Productions	
O C T	11	RDX Love	Bhanu Shankar	Payal Rajput, Tejus Kancherla, Dr V. K. Naresh, Mumaith Khan	Haappy Movies	
O C T	18	Krishna Rao Supermarket	Sreenath Pulakuram	Kriishna, Elsa Ghosh, Tanikella Bharani, Ravi Prakash, Sana, Gowtham Raju	BGR Film & TV Studios	
O C T	18	Malli Malli Chusa	Hemanth Karthik	Anurag Konidena, Shweta Avasthi, Kairavi Thakkar	Krishi Creations	
O C T	18	Operation Gold Fish	Sai Kiran Adivi	Aadi, Sasha Chettri, Nithya Naresh, Karthik Raju	Vinayakudu Talkies	
O C T	18	Raju Gari Gadhi 3	Ohmkar	Ashwin Babu, Avika Gor, Ali, Brahmaji, Urvashi, Ajay Ghosh, Prabhas Sreenu, Hari Teja, Dhanraj	Oak Entertainments	
O C T	18	Sarovaram	Suresh Yadavalli	Vishal Punna, Priyanka Sharma, Sri Latha, Tanikella Bharani	Srilatha Cine Creations	
O C T	25	Thupaki Ramudu	T. Prabhakar	Bithiri Sathi, Priya		
O C T	25	Vanavasam	Bharath Kumar P & Narendra	Naveenraj Sankarapu, Shashi Kanth, Sravya, Sruthi	Sri Sri Sri Bhavani Shankar Productions	
N O V	1	Aaviri	Ravi Babu	Ravi Babu, Neha Chauhan, Sri Muktha	Flying Frogs	
N O V	1	Dandupalyam 4	K. T. Nayak	Suman Ranganathan, Mumaith Khan, Petrol Prasanna, Venkat		
N O V	1	Meeku Maathrame Cheptha	Shammer Sulthan	Tharun Bhascker Dhaassyam, Vani Bhojan, Avantika Mishra, Pavani Gangireddy, Abhinav Gomatam, Anasuya Bharadwaj	Vijay Deverakonda Production; King of the Hill Entertainment	
N O V	1	Planning	B. L. Prasad	Mahindra, Kulkarni Mamata, Alisha, Ranga Sai, Adith Chaitanya Reddy	Sai Ganesh Movies	
N O V	8	Thipparaa Meesam	Krishna Vijay	Sree Vishnu, Nikki Tamboli, Rohini	Shri Om Cinema	
N O V	8	Konapuram Lo Jarigina Katha	K. B. Krishna	Anil Mogili, Sunitha Marasiar, Syed Sohel Ryan	Anusha Cinema	
N O V	15	Tenali Ramakrishna BA. BL	G. Nageswara Reddy	Sundeep Kishan, Hansika Motwani, Varalaxmi Sarathkumar	SNS Creations	
N O V	22	George Reddy	B. Jeevan Reddy	Sandeep Madhav, Shrinivas Pokale, Muskaan Khubchandani, Abhay Bethiganti, Satyadev, Devika Daftardar, Pawon Ramesh, Shatru, Manoj Nandam, Thiruveer, Pawon Ramesh, Bunny Abiran, Laxman Meesala, Yadamma Raju, Jagadeesh, Sanjay Reddy	Mic Movies; Three Line Cinemas; Silly Monks Studios	
N O V	22	Raagala 24 Gantallo	Srinivasa Reddy	Eesha Rebba, Satyadev, Sriram, Ganesh Venkatraman	Sree Karthikeya Celluloids	
N O V	22	Tholu Bommalata	Vishwanath Maganti	Rajendra Prasad, Viswant, Harshitha Chowdary, Vennela Kishore	M/s. Suma Durga Creations	
N O V	22	Pichhodu	Hemanth Srinivas	Kranthi, K. Simar, Posani Krishna Murali, Sameer, Satya Krishna, Abhay Bethiganti, Apparao, Achanta Mahesh, Durga	Hemanth Arts banner	
N O V	22	Beach Road Chetan	Chetan Maddineni	Chetan Maddineni, Teja Reddy, Razia Abdul, Anjali, Suja Ansari	Chetan Maddineni Productions	
N O V	22	Traap	V. S. Phanindra	Brahmaji, Mahendra, Katyayani Sharma, Shalu, Racha Ravi	PK Films	
N O V	29	Ranasthalam	Adhi Aravala	Satyam Rajesh, Jabardasth Appa Rao, Chatrapathi Sekhar, Shalu	Srilakshmi Arts	
N O V	29	Arjun Suravaram	T. N. Santhosh	Nikhil Siddharth, Lavanya Tripathi, Tarun Arora, Vennela Kishore	A MOVIE DYNAMIX LLP PRODUCTION	
N O V	29	Raja Vaaru Rani Gaaru	Ravi Kiran Kola	Kiran Abbavaram, Rahasya Gorak, Rajkumar Kasireddy, Yazurved Gurram, Snehamadhuri Sharma, Divya Narni	SL Entertainments	
N O V	29	Raghupathi Venkaiah Naidu	Babji	Naresh, Vahini, Tanikella Bharani, Maharshi Raghava, Muni Chandra, Satyapriya, Bhavana, Akhil, Geddayya, Sai Kanth, Devaraj, Chakrapaani, Taara Singh	Yellow Line Pictures	
D E C	6	Miss Match	N. V. Nirmal Kumar	Uday Shankar, Aishwarya Rajesh, Pradeep Rawat, Sanjay Swaroop, Master Adhiroh, Naga Mahesh	Adhiroh Creative Signs LLP	
D E C	6	Bhagyanagara Veedullo Gamattu	Srinivasa Reddy	Srinivasa Reddy, Dollysha, Vennela Kishore, Satya, Shakalaka Shankar, Chitram Srinu, Suman Setty, Raghu Babu, Jhansi, Satyam Rajesh, Viva Harsha, Praveen, Racha Ravi, Hyper Aadi	M/s. Flying Colours Entertainment	
D E C	6	Ashwamedham	Nitin Gawde	Shivangi Khedkar, Dhruva Karunakar, Priyadarshi Pulikonda, Vennela Kishore, Suman, Sonyaa, Ambati Arjun, Prachi	Aurous Avatar Entertainment	
D E C	6	90ML	Sekhar Reddy Yerra	Kartikeya Gummakonda, Neha Solanki, Ravi Kishan, Rao Ramesh, Ali, Posani Krishna Murali, Ajay, Prabhakar, Satya Prakash, Pragathi, Praveen, Raghu Karumanchi, Sudharshan, Thagubothu Ramesh, Roll Rida, Duvvasi Mohan	Kartikeya Creative works	
D E C	12	Amma Rajyam Lo Kadapa Biddalu	Ram Gopal Varma	Ajmal Ameer, Brahmanandam, Ali, Dheeraj Kv, Dhananjay Prabhune, Mahesh Kathi, Swapna, Dhanraj, Prudhvi Raj, Jaffar Babu	Tiger/Company Production; Ajay Mysore Productions	
D E C	13	Hulchul	Sripathi Karrl	Rudhraksh Utkam; Dhanya Balakrishna; Krishnudu; Madhunandan; Ravi Prakash	Sri Raghavendra Art Creations	
D E C	13	Venky Mama	K. S. Ravindra	Venkatesh, Naga Chaitanya, Raashi Khanna, Payal Rajput	Suresh Productions; People's Media Factory	
D E C	20	Ruler	K. S. Ravikumar	Nandamuri Balakrishna, Sonal Chauhan, Vedhika, Prakash Raj, Jayasudha, Bhumika Chawla, Sayaji Shinde, Nagineedu, Raghu Babu, Srinivasa Reddy	C.K. Entertainments	
D E C	20	Prati Roju Pandage	Maruthi	Sai Dharam Tej, Raashi Khanna, Sathyaraj, Rao Ramesh, Vijayakumar, Murali Sharma, Ajay, Hari Teja, Satyam Rajesh, Bharath Reddy, Suhas	GA2 Pictures; UV Creations	
D E C	25	Iddari Lokam Okate	G. R. Krishna	Raj Tarun, Shalini Pandey, Nassar, Master Bharath	Sri Venkateswara Creations	
D E C	25	Mathu Vadalara	Ritesh Rana	Sri Simha, Naresh Agastya, Athulya Chandra, Vennela Kishore, Satya, Brahmaji	Mythri Movie Makers; Clap Entertainment	
D E C	28	Software Sudheer	P. Rajasekhar Reddy	Sudigali Sudheer, Dhanya Balakrishna, Nassar, Sayaji Shinde, Indraja, Posani Krishna Murali, Siva Prasad	Sekhara Art Creations	

== See also ==
- List of Telugu films of 2018
- Lists of Telugu-language films
- List of Telugu films of 2020
