= Artificial (2012 film) =

- Directed by: Vijay Vemuri
- Written by: Vijay Vemuri
- Produced by: Vijaya Kumar Vemuri
- Starring: Supriya Aysola; Abhinav Gomatam; Mahesh Kumar Kathi; Rohan Deepti Naidu; Kranthi; Shwetha Chowdary
- Cinematography: Shyam. T
- Edited by: Nagaraju
- Music by: Satya Kashyap
- Release date: 27 April 2012
- Running time: 22 minutes
- Country: India
- Language: Telugu

Artificial is a 2012 Telugu short film that was produced and directed by Vijay Vemuri. The film had its world debut on 27 April 2012 and revolves around the fantasies of a young couple.

== Plot ==
A beautiful young housewife (Supriya Aysola) finds herself bored with her daily life and routine. As an escape she comes up with various daydreams and fantasies to make herself and the people around her more exciting.

== Cast ==
- Supriya Aysola as the housewife
- Abhinav Gomatam as Manav
- Mahesh Kumar Kathi as the therapist
- Deepti Naidu as the sales person
- Kranthi as the customer
- Shwetha Chowdary as the slum dwelling woman
- Rohan as the rag picker

== Production ==
Vijay filmed the movie using a Canon 5D that he had rented due to having a budget of only ₹250,000. He did not begin filming until four years after he had finished the movie's script, as it took him a while to find a cast and crew that he felt could help him make the movie. Casting took almost two years to complete and Vijay eventually chose actress Supriya Aysola to perform in the film's lead role. Of the film's inspiration, Vijay has stated that he was inspired from a late-night television show that dealt with "extreme psycho-sexual disorders".

== Awards ==
- Platinum Reel Award for Best Short Film at the Nevada Film Festival (2012, won)
