= Vivek Sagar =

Indian music composer (born 1989)

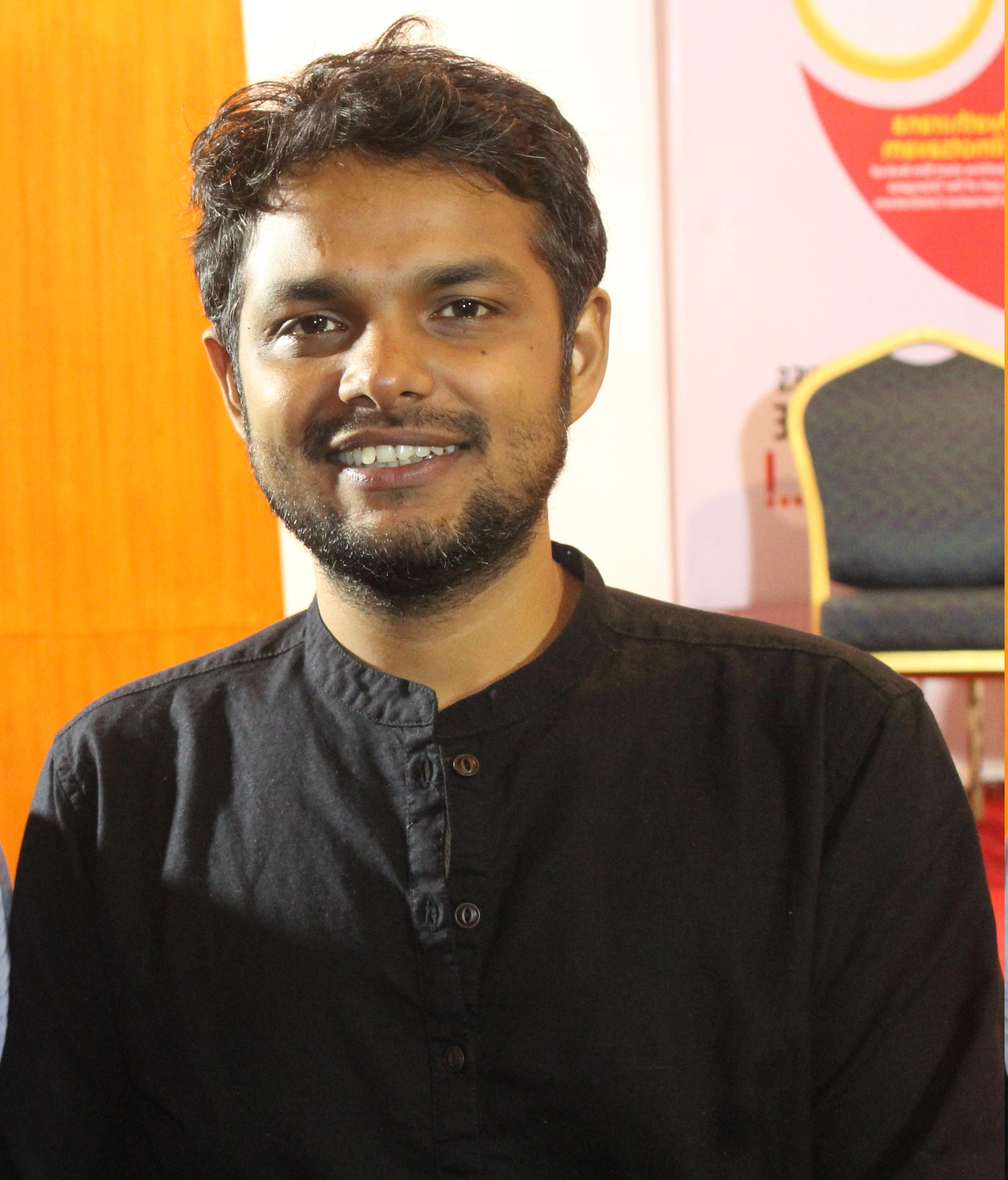
- Sagar in 2018
- Born: 1983 or 1984 (age 42–43); Hyderabad
- Occupations: Singer; Songwriter; Film composer; Record Producer; Music Director
- Years active: 2013–present
- Musical career
- Genres: Film score, Electronic; Rock; Fusion; Blues; Indian classical
- Instruments: Keyboard; synth; piano; mandolin; guitar
- Label: Tapeloop

Vivek Sagar (6, August) is an Indian composer, record producer and playback singer who works in Telugu cinema . He debuted with the film, Pelli Choopulu (2016). Upon critical acclaim for the album garnered him his first nomination for Filmfare Award for Best Music Director – Telugu at 64th Filmfare Awards South.

He scored for Sammohanam (2018) and garnered his second nomination for Filmfare Award for Best Music Director – Telugu at 66th Filmfare Awards South. The same year, he again collaborated with Pelli Choopulu director Tharun Bhascker for Ee Nagaraniki Emaindi.

== Life ==
Vivek Sagar has done his schooling at All Saints High School in Hyderabad. Sagar studied Electronics and communications engineering before embarking on a career in music. He began his career as a music composer with a short film, Sainma.

Vivek married Keerthi Surya Seethalam in 2021.

== Career ==
He gained recognition for the Telugu film Pelli Choopulu (2016). He has stated that he believes music should be custom-written for the movie's story and that he will avoid "commercial music".

== Discography ==
=== As composer ===
Year	Title	Notes
2013	Race	Composed along with Sanjay
2016	Pelli Choopulu	Nominated–Filmfare Award for Best Music Director – Telugu; Nominated–SIIMA Award for Best Music Director – Telugu
2017	Yuddham Sharanam	
2017	Story Discussion	Web series
2018	Sammohanam	Nominated–Filmfare Award for Best Music Director – Telugu
2018	Ee Nagaraniki Emaindi	
2018	Nirudyoga Natulu	Web series
2019	Mithai	
2019	Falaknuma Das	
2019	Brochevarevarura	
2020	HIT: The First Case	
2021	Pitta Kathalu	
2021	Raja Raja Chora	
2022	Modern Love Hyderabad	Web series
2022	Aa Ammayi Gurinchi Meeku Cheppali	
2022	Ante Sundaraniki	
2022	Neetho	
2023	Keedaa Cola	
2024	Double Engine	
2024	Sheeshmahal	Made in 2013; multilingual
2024	Darling	
2024	35	
2024	Swag	
2024	Chivaraku Migiledhi	Released on YouTube
2025	Sarangapani Jathakam	
2025	Subham	Only background score
2026	Vanaveera	
2026	Hey Balwanth	
2026	ENE Repeat	
2027	Thulabharam †	

=== As playback singer ===
- 2020: "Sanchari" (Hyderabad Gig)
- 2020: "Saami Saami" (Chivaraku Migiledhi)
- 2020: "Dorakadendi Ra" ( from Kotha Poradu series)
- 2025: "Ee Dhooramey" (Little Hearts)
- 2026: "Choodayyo" (Youth)
