= Ori Devuda =

- Theatrical release poster
- Directed by: Ashwath Marimuthu
- Written by: Ashwath Marimuthu
- Dialogue by: Tharun Bhascker
- Based on: Oh My Kadavule (2020) by Ashwath Marimuthu
- Produced by: Pearl V. Potluri; Param V. Potluri; Dil Raju; Sirish
- Starring: Vishwak Sen; Mithila Palkar; Asha Bhat; Venkatesh
- Cinematography: Vidhu Ayyanna
- Edited by: Vijay Mukthavarapu
- Music by: Leon James
- Production companies: PVP Cinema; Sri Venkateswara Creations
- Release date: 21 October 2022
- Running time: 141 minutes
- Country: India
- Language: Telugu

Ori Devuda (transl. Oh My God) is a 2022 Indian Telugu-language fantasy romantic comedy film directed by Ashwath Marimuthu and produced by Pearl V. Potluri, Param V. Potluri, Dil Raju and Sirish through PVP Cinema and Sri Venkateswara Creations. The film stars Vishwak Sen, Mithila Palkar (in her Telugu debut), Asha Bhat while Venkatesh made an extended cameo appearance. and music was composed by Leon James. A remake of the Ashwath's own Tamil film Oh My Kadavule (2020), it was released on 21 October 2022. The film garnered mixed to positive reviews from critics and audiences as well, praising the performances and storyline of the film.

== Plot ==
Anu, Arjun and Mani are best friends since childhood. During a party to celebrate Arjun clearing his Engineering arrear exams, Anu tells the other two of her father Paulraj looking for a groom for her. She suddenly asks Arjun if he'd like to marry her, to which he agrees. One year later, Anu and Arjun are seen sitting in family court for a final hearing to obtain a divorce. A man sits behind Arjun and predicts that he won't get his divorce on that day as his wife will faint and be rushed to hospital, then he provides him a visiting card and disappears. To Arjun's shock, all the events predicted by this strange man turn out true, and the case is postponed to the evening. Arjun rushes to the address mentioned on the visiting card. There, he encounters the man, who introduces himself as God. Arjun explains his problems to God.

Arjun, after marriage, continues to treat Anu as a friend and things are smooth until he starts working in Paulraj's toilet manufacturing factory as a quality control checker. Arjun hates this job but gets used to it. But he is unable to see Anu as anything more than a friend and is bored by the monotony of his life. One day, he meets Meera, his school senior and childhood crush, who now works as an assistant film director. They strike up a friendship, with Meera encouraging Arjun to explore his passion for acting and requesting him to audition for Puri Jagannadh's upcoming film. The audition goes very well, with Arjun impressing the director with his performance. Later at a pub, Meera tells Arjun about her failed film-making attempts and a past breakup. Arjun consoles Meera and hugs her, but this is noticed by Anu, who is already sad at Arjun not reciprocating her feelings and assumes they are having an extramarital affair. Anu and Arjun have a nasty quarrel, which ends with Arjun asking for a divorce.

Back in the present, Arjun blames God for his current situation. So God gives Arjun a second chance to rectify the mistake with a golden ticket with three conditions - The ticket should stay with Arjun always, he should tell nobody about this ticket, and if at all he tells anyone about the ticket, he will die. Accepting the conditions, Arjun grabs the ticket and time travels to the night when he accepted Anu's marriage proposal.

This time, Arjun rejects Anu's proposal. Therefore, Anu decides to marry Matthew, the groom chosen by her father. Meanwhile, Arjun decides to pursue Meera, feeling that she is the right person for him. They strike a friendship, with Arjun removing all barriers which caused Meera's film-making attempts to fail in the original timeline. Arjun also decides to pursue acting as a career and Anu manages to convince his parents on the same. Meera soon starts to reciprocate Arjun's interest in her. He goes to tell Paulraj to congrats Anu on his engagement and gets into a deep conversation with him. Paulraj tells Arjun that he hails from a very backward village in Prakasam Dist and his mother died 50 years ago by snake bite, due to a lack of toilets. He then left the village as a teenager, with the mission of eradicating open defecation in his area. That led to him creating his latrine company and achieving his goal of bringing toilets to his native village. This revelation makes Arjun realize his mistake of ridiculing their business.

Anu learns that Arjun likes Meera and there is a fair chance that Meera might reciprocate his love too. So Anu offers to help Arjun to propose Meera, asking him to make a video for Meera's upcoming birthday with wishes from Meera's family/friends and propose to her at the end of the video. As a result, they go on a bike ride to Kerala, which is Meera's home state. By this time, through various instances, Arjun had started to realize how sweet and loving Anu is, and how supportive Anu's father was. During the trip, Arjun realizes that he loves Anu and that his interest in Meera is just an infatuation. While on the Kerala trip, Arjun and Anu come across Meera's ex-boyfriend Krishna (Santhosh Prathap), who broke up with Meera to focus on his boxing career, however, he has also not gotten over her. Arjun decides to reunite Meera and Krishna instead and modifies the video accordingly. Meera reconciles with Krishna on her birthday after watching the video.

Arjun attends Anu's wedding with Matthew with a heavy heart. Unable to express his feelings for Anu, Arjun walks out of the church with Mani. At this juncture, they see Anu running out of the church without getting married. They meet her in their usual hangout pub, where she reveals her love for Arjun and also adds that she knew his feelings for her, hence she canceled the wedding at the last minute. But Arjun again refuses to marry her as he does not want to hurt her again. When confronted by Anu and Mani, he blurts out about the second chance and the golden ticket. Immediately the ticket flies away from Arjun and in a bid to catch it, he gets hit by a lorry, killing him.

Arjun finds himself with God once again and pleads for one final chance; this time God states that no more final chances will be given to him and sends him away, asking him to take care of his problems. Then Arjun realizes that he is back in reality; on the day his divorce hearing is taking place. He rushes back to the court, where Anu is ready to give consent to the divorce. This time, Arjun refuses to divorce and confesses his love to Anu. Anu accepts Arjun's love and reunites with him. It is revealed that God has given Arjun yet another chance and blesses him to go and live happily with Anu.

== Cast ==
- Vishwak Sen as Arjun Durgaraju; Anu's bestie turned husband
- Mithila Palkar as Anu Arjun (née Paulraj); Arjun's bestie turned wife
- Asha Bhat as Meera; Arjun's senior in school on whom he had a crush (Voice dubbed by Chinmayi)
- Venkatesh Kakumanu as Mani, Arjun and Anu's friend
- Venkatesh as God in an extended cameo appearance
- Rahul Ramakrishna as God's Assistant
- Murali Sharma as Paulraj; Anu's father
- Nagineedu as Durgaraju; Arjun's father
- Rajashri Nair as Arjun's mother
- Santhosh Prathap as Krishna, Meera's ex-boyfriend
- Jayalalita as judge
- Jeevan Kumar as divorce lawyer
- Mounika Reddy as Swathi, Mani's wife
- Puri Jagannadh as himself in a guest appearance
- Srividya as Anu's mother (in portrait)

== Soundtrack ==
Ori Devuda

Soundtrack album by Leon James
- Released: 2022
- Recorded: 2021–2022
- Genre: Feature film soundtrack
- Language: Telugu
- Label: Mango Music; Saregama
- Producer: Leon James

Leon James chronology
Paagal (2021)	Ori Devuda (2022)	Das Ka Dhamki (2023)

Singles from Ori Devuda
- 1. "Paathashalaloo" Released: 7 February 2022; 2. "Avunanavaa" Released: 27 September 2022; 3. "Gundellonaa" Released: 11 October 2022

The film score and soundtrack album were composed by Leon James.The audio rights were acquired by Mango Music and Saregama.

Track listing
No.	Title	Lyrics	Singer(s)	Length
1.	"Paathashalaloo"	Ananta Sriram	Armaan Malik, Sameera Bharadwaj	3:54
2.	"Avunanavaa"	Ramajogayya Sastry	Sid Sriram	4:54
3.	"Gundellonaa"	Kasarla Shyam	Anirudh Ravichander	3:31
4.	"Marachipolene"	Ramajogayya Sastry	Ravi G	3:57
5.	"Ninna Monnalaga"	Ramajogayya Sastry	Leon James	2:17
6.	"Yendhi Ra Life Idhi"	Kittu	Deepak Blue	1:17
7.	"Evariki Vaaree"	Kasarla Shyam	Harish Sivaramakrishnan	4:35
Total length:				22:44

== Release ==
The film was released in theatres on 21 October 2022, coinciding with Deepavali.

=== Home media ===
Aha acquired the streaming rights of the film and made it available from 11 November 2022.

== Reception ==
Paul Nicodemus of The Times of India rated the film 3 out of 5 stars and wrote "Ori Devuda is a relatable rom-com with a touch of fantasy and tries to appeal to your senses. Watch it for its second half". Murali Krishna CH of Cinema Express rated the film 2.5 out of 5 Stars and wrote "For those who've seen Oh My Kadavule, it's unlikely that the remake will keep them entertained. And for the rest, it might come across as a thoughtful romantic drama that is powered by beautiful writing". The Hans India rated the film 2 out of 5 stars and wrote "Ori Devuda has an exciting and relatable premise, but it fails to deliver the right dose of fun and drama to have an impact. It ends as a passable watch, with a few moments working intermittently".
