= ENE Repeat =

2026 Indian film by Tharun Bhascker

- Theatrical Release Poster
- Directed by: Tharun Bhascker
- Written by: Tharun Bhascker
- Produced by: Srujan Yarabolu; Sandeep Nagireddy
- Starring: Vishwak Sen; Abhinav Gomatam; Venkatesh Kakamanu; Shivathmika Rajashekar; Anisha Ambrose
- Cinematography: AJ Aaron
- Edited by: Ravi Teja Girijala
- Music by: Vivek Sagar
- Production companies: S Originals; Rootnode Cinema
- Release date: 19 November 2026
- Country: India
- Language: Telugu
- Box office: ₹19.52 crore

ENE Repeat is an 2026 indian Telugu-language buddy comedy film directed and written by Tharun Bhascker and produced by Srujan Yarabolu and Sandeep Nagireddy, under S Originals and Rootnode Cinema. A sequel to the 2018 film, Ee Nagaraniki Emaindhi, the film stars Vishwak Sen, Abhinav Gomatam, Venkatesh Kakumanu, and Srinath Maganti in the lead roles, alongside Anisha Ambrose, Shivathmika Rajashekar, Priyadarshini Ram, Karuna Kumar and Mahesh Chintala.

The film was released theatrically on 19 November 2026.

== Plot ==
The film follows four friends as they navigate their personal ambitions, relationships and shared experiences. Their pursuit of individual dreams leads to a series of humorous and unexpected situations. The story continues the friendship-centred narrative of its predecessor, Ee Nagaraniki Emaindhi.

== Cast ==
- Vishwak Sen as Vivek
- Abhinav Gomatam as Kaushik
- Venkatesh Kakumanu as Uppi
- Srinath Maganti as Karthik
- Anisha Ambrose as Shirley
- Shivathmika Rajashekar as Keerthana
- Priyadarshini Ram as Muralidhar, Keerthana’s father
- Karuna Kumar as Gopal, Uppi’s father and Muralidhar’s brother
- Mahesh Chintala as Robin
- Jeevan Kumar as Vivek’s uncle
- Geetha Bhasker as Vivek’s mother
- Sreerama Chandra as Ankit, Keerthana’s fiancee
- Talluri Rameswari as Uppi and Keerthana’s grandmother
- Madhurima Narla as Keerthana’s mother
- Sinjith Yerramilli as Kaushik’s manager

=== Cameo Appearances ===
- Sujeeth
- Anil Ravipudi
- Rajeev Kanakala
- Sandeep Reddy Vanga
- K. V. Anudeep
- Nandini Reddy

== Development ==
ENE Repeat is the sequel to the 2018 Telugu film Ee Nagaraniki Emaindhi, which was written and directed by Tharun Bhascker Dhaassyam. The sequel brings back the director and several members of the original cast. The project continues the buddy comedy theme of its predecessor, focusing on friendship and the experiences of a group of young people.

The film is produced by Srujan Yarabolu and Sandeep Nagireddy under the production banners of S Originals and Rootnode Cinema.

== Filming and technical crew ==
Tharun Bhascker Dhaassyam serves as the writer and director. The cinematography is handled by A. J. Aaron, while Raviteja Girijala serves as the editor. Vivek Sagar composed the music. The technical crew also includes stunt coordinator Wing Chun Anji and choreographer Eshwar Penti.

== Release ==
ENE Repeat was released theatrically on 19 November 2026.

== Reception ==
=== Box office ===
On its opening day, the film grossed ₹12.05 crore globally.
