= Pitta Kathalu =

2021 Indian Telugu-language anthology film

- Official release poster
- Directed by: Nag Ashwin; B. V. Nandini Reddy; Tharun Bhascker; Sankalp Reddy
- Written by: Tharun Bhascker; Radhika Anand; Nag Ashwin; Nanda Kishore Emani
- Produced by: Ronnie Screwvala; Ashi Dua
- Starring: Shruti Haasan; Satyadev; Eesha Rebba; Amala Paul; Lakshmi Manchu; Jagapathi Babu; Ashima Narwal
- Cinematography: Naveen Yadav; Niketh Bommireddy; Richard Prasad
- Edited by: Abhinav Reddy Danda; Kiran Ganti; Junaid Siddiqui; Upendra Varma
- Music by: Songs: Vivek Sagar; Mickey J. Meyer; Sanjith Hegde–Soorya Praveen; Prashanth R Vihari; Score: Smaran
- Production companies: RSVP Movies; Flying Unicorn Entertainment; Sainma Entertainment; Kwan South Entertainment Services; First Frame Entertainments
- Distributed by: Netflix
- Release date: 19 February 2021
- Running time: 150 minutes
- Country: India
- Language: Telugu

Pitta Kathalu (transl. Short stories) is a 2021 Indian Telugu-language anthology drama film consisting of four short film segments, directed by Nag Ashwin, B. V. Nandini Reddy, Tharun Bhascker, and Sankalp Reddy. The film features an ensemble cast of Amala Paul, Ashwin Kakumanu, Eesha Rebba, Jagapati Babu, Satyadev, Lakshmi Manchu, Ashima Narwal, Saanve Megghana, Sanjith Hegde, and Shruti Haasan, amongst others. The film was produced by RSVP Movies and Flying Unicorn Entertainment. The film premiered on Netflix on 19 February 2021. It is Netflix's first Telugu original film.

== Segments ==
Segment	Director	Writer	Music
Ramula	Tharun Bhascker	Tharun Bhascker	Vivek Sagar
Meera	B. V. Nandini Reddy	Radhika Anand	Mickey J. Meyer
xLife	Nag Ashwin	Nag Ashwin	Sanjith Hegde, Soorya Praveen
Pinky	Sankalp Reddy	Nanda Kishore Emani	Prashanth R Vihari

== Plot ==
=== Ramula ===
This story follows a young woman from a small town in Telangana named Ramula (Saanve Megghana) and her vain boyfriend, Ram Chander (Abhay Bethiganti). A politician named Swaroopakka (Manchu Lakshmi) witnesses Ramula attempting suicide by jumping from a bridge and stops her. Ramula explains that her boyfriend broke up with her. Swaroopakka suggests she seduce Ram and film a sex tape to determine if he is just using her, allowing Ramula to ruin him in revenge. After having sex, Ram goes to his parents, expresses his love for Ramula, and decides to marry her. Ramula is happy to learn this, and Ram plans to propose to her in front of her family. Ramula calls Swaroopakka to share the good news, but Swaroopakka decides to ruin them both to advance her own career; she releases their sex tape on a live news program, which Ramula's family sees. A traumatized Ramula jumps from her terrace and dies in front of Ram, who has brought a band to propose to her. The story ends with Ram tearfully shouting Ramula's name.

=== Meera ===
This story centers on a young wife named Meera (Amala Paul), who is going through a difficult time due to her suspicious and abusive husband, Vishwa Mohan (Jagapathi Babu). Meera is pregnant and has two children. She is having an affair with Shiva (Ashwin Kakumanu), of which Vishwa is aware. At the couple's 10th anniversary celebration, Vishwa's friend Abbas (Vamsee Chaganti) gifts them a portrait of a girl looking back over her shoulder. The guests remark that the girl resembles Meera; this enrages Vishwa, who slaps Abbas and causes everyone to leave. The next day, he takes Meera to the hospital to determine the paternity of her unborn child. Meanwhile, one of Vishwa's friends and his wife learn that Meera has been raped multiple times by Vishwa. Later, Vishwa hallucinates Abbas and Meera having sex, which drives him to Abbas's house to confront him. Vishwa beats Abbas, only to discover him having sex with another man, revealing that Abbas is gay. Vishwa is subsequently sentenced to seven years in prison. It is then revealed that Shiva was a fictional character Meera created to provoke Vishwa as a ploy to escape her marriage. In the end, Meera smiles, having gained her freedom.

=== xLife ===
xLife is the story of Vikram, or Vik (Sanjith Hegde), a young man who controls the world through his advanced technology, a VR platform called X-Life. One day, his company celebrates reaching four billion users, but the system is hacked by Vik's college friend Neel (Sangeeth Shoban). When Neel warns Vik to stop X-Life, Vik uses a device on Neel's forehead that paralyses him and traps him in his worst fears. After incapacitating Neel, Vik sees Divya (Shruti Haasan), a kitchen staff member caught stealing food. He leaves her with a warning but sends her high-quality food. A few days later, Vik uses Divya as a model to promote his friend's biscuit company. He fires Divya, then rehires her as his personal assistant. He invites her to dinner via virtual reality, but she declines, saying she knows a better place to eat. She takes him to a terrace where they share a loaf of bread. Divya wants to eradicate hunger and teach Vik the value of food.

The next day, Vik finds her missing. Upon reviewing the CCTV footage, he sees his assistant Kranthi (Dayanand Reddy) harassing Divya. Vikram finds Divya attempting to jump off the building, but he saves and calms her. Vik proposes to Divya, and they kiss. Moments later, Vik takes her to the X-Life server room ("the heart"). While Vik shows her the heart, Divya uses the paralytic device on him. It is revealed that Divya and Neel were working together to shut down X-Life, wanting people to enjoy the real world rather than remain addicted to a controlled virtual one. Divya had also staged the incident with Kranthi. She removes the batteries from the mainframe and reveals that she knew Vik's fear was his father—as Vik had witnessed his mother's domestic abuse—so she forces him to relive those memories. X-Life shuts down, and people everywhere remove their headsets to see the world around them.

=== Pinky ===
Pinky is about an upcoming writer, Vivek (Satyadev), who is in a committed relationship but is having an illicit affair with his ex-wife, Pinky (Eesha Rebba).

== Cast ==
Ramula	Meera	xLife	Pinky
Abhay Bethiganti as Ram Chander; Saanve Megghana as Ramula; Lakshmi Manchu as Swaroopakka; Anjaiah Milkuri as Kishan, Ramula's brother; Venkat Kanaka as Bal Reddy, a party worker; Sai Mahesh as Kiran, a party worker; Shivani Mahi as Swathi; Muralidhar Goud	Jagapathi Babu as Vishwa Mohan; Amala Paul as Meera; Ashwin Kakumanu as Shiva; Pragathi as CI; Vamsee Chaganti as Abbas; Kireeti Damaraju as Vivek; Kunak Kaushik as Sandeep; Sunaina as Shobha	Shruti Haasan as Divya; Sanjith Hegde as Vik; Sangeeth Sobhan as Neel; Uko as General Koko; Anish Kuruvilla as Broski; Thanmayi as Heera; Dayanand Reddy as Kranthi	Eesha Rebba as Priyanka "Pinky"; Satyadev as Vivek; Srinivas Avasarala as Harsha; Ashima Narwal as Indu

== Reception ==
Hemanth Kumar of Firstpost gave the film 3 out of 5 stars and wrote, "On the whole, Pitta Kathalu is a mixed bag and not all short stories find their rhythm and clarity of thought to say what they want to. But it's also a step in the right direction in many ways. Pitta Kathalu exists in a Telugu cinematic universe and in this world, women are largely in control of their own lives, and more than anything, they hate to be mansplained. Thank God, they aren’t treated like deities with pure thoughts and leading pious lives. Their shades of grey is what adds colour to Pitta Kathalu." Neeshita Nyayapati of The Times of India wrote, "While one has to search hard to find imperfection in Tharun’s rural tale, Nandini, Nag Ashwin and Sankalp’s urban stories in Pitta Kathalu are not without flaws. Predictability haunts all the stories to a certain extent, but what matters is how the directors manage to pull it off. It is definitely refreshing to see Telugu cinema tell tales of real, damaged relationships (and women) on screen without judgement. Give this one a try this weekend!" Baradwaj Rangan of Film Companion South wrote, "Two films work. Two don’t. And the standout is Tharun Bhascker Dhaassyam’s 'Ramula’, which takes big risks with form."
