= Das Ka Dhamki =

- Theatrical release poster
- Directed by: Vishwak Sen
- Written by: Vishwak Sen; Prasanna Kumar Bezawada
- Produced by: Karate Raju; Vishwak Sen
- Starring: Vishwak Sen; Nivetha Pethuraj
- Cinematography: Dinesh K. Babu; George C. Williams (1 song)
- Edited by: Anwar Ali
- Music by: Leon James; Ram Miriyala (1 song); Bhadru Nayak
- Production companies: Vanmaye Creations; Vishwaksen Cinemas
- Release date: 22 March 2023
- Running time: 151 minutes
- Country: India
- Language: Telugu
- Box office: est. ₹23.20 crores

Das Ka Dhamki (transl. Das' Warning) is a 2023 Indian Telugu-language action comedy thriller film directed by Vishwak Sen, who co-wrote the story along with Prasanna Kumar Bezawada. It is produced by Karate Raju, Vishwak's father, under the banners, Vanmaye Creations and Vishwaksen Cinemas. It stars Vishwak in a dual role as hero and villain alongside Nivetha Pethuraj, while Rao Ramesh, Tharun Bhascker, Akshara Gowda, Hyper Aadi, Ajay, and Rohini play supporting roles.

Das Ka Dhamki was released on 22 March 2023 to mixed reviews from critics and became a commercial success at the box office.

== Plot ==
Krishna Das is a waiter at a five-star hotel in Hyderabad called "Eestin", who tries to live a lavish lifestyle, as he is constantly degraded by customers for being poor. Along with his friends, Mahesh and Aadhi, Krishna tries to live life to the fullest. One day at the hotel, Krishna meets Keerthi, and she falls in love with him due to Krishna projecting himself as the CEO of the pharmaceutical company "SR Pharma Life." Keerthi later finds out that Krishna cheated her with her lies and is later fired from the hotel. In a desperation to arrange money for his living arrangements, Krishna is found by SR Pharma Life's co-founder.

It is later revealed that the CEO of SR Pharma Life Sanjay Rudra is Krishna's doppelgänger. Sanjay is a rich and kind-hearted doctor who is developing a drug that can cure cancer in order to achieve his dream of a cancer-free world. He later finds an investor named Dhanunjay, who invests ₹10,000 crore into the project. When Sanjay mysteriously dies in a car accident, Krishna is asked to take over the responsibility of the company and Sanjay's family for 10 days. This leaves Krishna confused and happy as he can lead a rich life and impress Keerthi for a short period. However, Krishna decides to investigate the accident and deduces that he himself is the sole cause of Sanjay's death, as he was racing Sanjay and poured coffee on his car's windshield, causing the accident to occur.

Krishna has a hard time adjusting to the fact that he is responsible for Sanjay's death and admits this to Sanjay's paralyzed mother Janakamma. Unable to act as Sanjay, Krishna calls Sanjay's uncle Siddharth and tells him that he will reveal his identity and that Sanjay died in a car accident. It is then revealed that Sanjay is still alive and is not the person who he claims to be. Sanjay and his professor invented a drug that can cure cancer, but Sanjay killed his professor after his refusal to sell the drug in order to make profits. However, the drug only worked once and ended up killing everyone in the clinical trials. This caused Sanjay to come up with his own form of the drug; however, that too failed miserably. Sanjay then tried to escape abroad with the ₹10,000 crore and used Krishna in the process.

Krishna ends up escaping from the police and calls Keerthi for help, but later learns that she was also behind the scandal and had just used Krishna to get Sanjay out of the country. Keerthi's real name is Dolly. Not knowing what to do, Krishna gets Mahesh and Aadhi to help him lure Sanjay into a trap. Sanjay later falls into the trap, and Krishna uses the opportunity to switch places with Sanjay, while getting him arrested. Krishna then gets Sanjay's family (except his mother) also arrested and leaves the place with all the money, where he also dupes Keerthi into believing that he is Sanjay and marries her. A year later, it is revealed that Sanjay has come up with a mind control drug in prison, which allows him to escape. Sanjay calls Krishna, telling him about his return, implying that the story would continue in Dhamki 2.

== Cast ==
- Vishwak Sen in a dual role as
  - Krishna Das (Protagonist)
  - Dr. Sanjay Rudra (Antagonist)
- Nivetha Pethuraj as Keerthi/Dolly Wife of Krishna Das
- Rao Ramesh as Siddharth Malhotra, Sanjay's uncle
- Tharun Bhascker as a blue car customer
- Akshara Gowda as Deepthi, Krishna Das' manager
- Hyper Aadi as Aadhi, Krishna Das' friend
- Mahesh Achanta as Mahesh, Krishna Das' friend
- Ajay as Investor Dhanunjay
- Rohini as Janakamma, Sanjay's mother
- Prudhvi Raj as Sanjay's uncle
- Rajitha as Sanjay's aunt
- Surya as Sanjay’s professor
- Duvvasi Mohan as Chef Babai Janakiram
- Muralidhar Goud as Sanjay’s pretending father
- Shaurya Kare as Sanjay’s colleague
- Rati Hulji as Sanjay’s fiancée
- Kadambari Kiran as Chandra Shekhar, a house owner
- Amith Sharma as Ajay, Keerthi’s date
- Santosh Babu as Waiter Santosh
- Pranati Rai Prakash in a special appearance in the item song, "O Dollar Pillagaa"

== Production ==
In March 2022, it was announced that Naresh Kuppili and Vishwak Sen would be coming together for a second film called Das Ka Dhamki. Later that month Vishwak decided to direct the film instead. Filming commenced in March 2022 in Hyderabad and was completed in February 2023.

== Soundtrack ==
Das Ka Dhamki

Soundtrack album by Leon James
- Released: 2023
- Recorded: 2022–2023
- Genre: Feature film soundtrack
- Length: 10:39
- Language: Telugu
- Label: Saregama
- Producer: Leon James

Leon James chronology
Ori Devuda (2022)	Das Ka Dhamki (2023)	Single Shankarum Smartphone Simranum (2023)

The film score and soundtrack album of the film is composed by Leon James with one song, "Mawa Bro" composed by Ram Miriyala.

No.	Title	Lyrics	Music	Singer(s)	Length
1.	"Almost Padipoyindhe Pilla"	Purnachari	Leon James	Adithya RK, Leon James	3:33
2.	"Mawa Bro"	Kasarla Shyam	Ram Miriyala	Ram Miriyala	3:39
3.	"O Dollar Pillagaa"	Purnachari	Leon James	Deepak Blue, Mangli	3:27
Total length:					10:39

== Release ==
Das Ka Dhamki was scheduled to release on 17 February 2023, but was later postponed. Finally, the film was theatrically released on 22 March 2023. The worldwide theatrical rights of the film were sold at a cost of ₹8 crore. It was dubbed and theatrically released in Hindi on 14 April 2023.

=== Home media ===
The digital streaming rights were acquired by Aha. It premiered on Aha on 14 April 2023 in Telugu language. It has been dubbed and premiered in Tamil in Aha on 12 May 2023.

== Reception ==
=== Critical reception ===
Srivathsan Nadadhur of OTTplay gave 3 out of 5 stars and wrote "Das Ka Dhamki is a largely engaging commercial cocktail that goes overboard in trying to outsmart the viewer with its twists. Writer Prasanna Bezawada’s entertaining script, despite its issues, has enough meat to keep you invested. Vishwak Sen in his second directorial makes commendable progress as a storyteller and relishes the juicy prospect of enacting a dual role."

Neeshita Nyayapathi of The Times of India gave 2 out of 5 stars and wrote "Das Ka Dhamki is a film that’s just potential wasted. It works only in parts and spends the ending setting up a conflict for a sequel. Did it need as many cuss words? Probably no. Could’ve it done with some fine tuning? Yes. Maybe they’ll do that in the next part!" Raghu Bandi of The New Indian Express gave 2 out of 5 stars and wrote "Das Ka Dhamki is entertaining if you are in the mood for a typical commercial potboiler."

Sangeetha Devi Dundoo of The Hindu wrote "Vishwak Sen co-writes, directs and dons dual roles but this shape-shifting story is a test of patience."

Abhilasha Cherukuri of Cinema Express gave 2.5 out of 5 stars and wrote "Das Ka Dhamki ends with the promise of a sequel. And if it materializes, I hope the writing is as strong and meaningful as Vishwak’s aspirations."
