= Masthu Shades Unnai Raa =

2024 Indian film by Thiru

- Theatrical release poster
- Directed by: Thiru (Thirupathi Rao Indla)
- Screenplay by: Thiru
- Story by: Anwar Sadiq
- Produced by: Aarem Reddy; Prashanth. V; Bhavani Kasula
- Starring: Abhinav Gomatam; Vaishali Raj
- Cinematography: Siddhartha Swayambhoo
- Edited by: Ravi Teja Girijala
- Music by: Score; Samuel Aby; Songs; Sanjeev. T
- Production company: Kasula Creative Works
- Release date: 23 February 2024
- Running time: 139 minutes
- Country: India
- Language: Telugu

Masthu Shades Unnai Raa is a 2024 Indian Telugu-language slice of life drama film directed by Thiru. The film features Abhinav Gomatam and Vaishali Raj in lead roles. It is a remake of Malayalam film Manoharam (2019). Masthu Shades Unnai Raa was released on 23 February 2024.

== Cast ==
- Abhinav Gomatam as Manohar "Manu"
  - Rishi as Young Manu
- Vaishali Raj as Uma
- Nizhalgal Ravi as Jaggu Mama
- Moin as Shiva
  - Rohan Roy as Young Shiva
- Ali Reza as Rahul
  - Karthikeya as Young Rahul
- Chakrapani Ananda as Venkanna Mama
- Jyothi Reddy as Manu's mother
- Krishna Kumar as Rahul's father
- Ravindar Bommakanti as Balachandar
- Sai Krishna as Vijay
- Lavanya Reddy as Vidya
- Sandhya Janak as Uma's mother
- Surya as Machine Das
- Phani as Karthik
- Ramani as Venkanna Mama's wife
- Rocket Raghava as Purushottam
- Yogi Katri
- Tharun Bhascker as MLA Veer Das
- M. V. V. Satyanarayana as Ranganathan
- Shweta Avasthi as Lilly
  - Emlin as Young Lilly
- Chitra Shukla

== Music ==
The film's soundtrack album is composed by Sanjeev. T and background score is composed by Samuel Aby.

All lyrics are written by Kittu Vissapragada; all music is composed by Sanjeev T.

Track list
No.	Title	Singer(s)	Length
1.	"Hello Ammayi"	Sid Sriram	4:42
2.	"Entha Chitram Chudu" (Additional Vocals: Krishna Tejasvi)	Sanjeev T	3:57
3.	"Chinni Jeevithame"	Hemachandra, Sanjeev T	3:51
4.	"Oore Pilavaga"	Sanjeev T	3:13

== Release ==
Masthu Shades Unnai Raa was released on 23 February 2024. Post-theatrical digital streaming rights were acquired by Amazon Prime Video and was premiered on 29 March 2024.

== Reception ==
The New Indian Express rated the film 2 out of 5 wrote that "Despite some strong moments and a sincere Abhinav Gomatam performance, the film remains generic, a mediocre fare at best".
