= Sammohanam =

2018 film directed by Mohan Krishna Indraganti

- Theatrical release poster
- Directed by: Mohana Krishna Indraganti
- Written by: Mohana Krishna Indraganti
- Produced by: Sivalenka Krishna Prasad
- Starring: Sudheer Babu; Aditi Rao Hydari
- Cinematography: P. G. Vinda
- Edited by: Marthand K. Venkatesh
- Music by: Vivek Sagar
- Production company: Sridevi Movies
- Release date: June 15, 2018
- Running time: 144 minutes
- Country: India
- Language: Telugu
- Budget: ₹10–15 crore
- Box office: est. ₹15.7 crore

Sammohanam (transl. Enchantment) is a 2018 Indian Telugu-language romantic drama film written and directed by Mohana Krishna Indraganti. Produced by Sivalenka Krishna Prasad, it features Sudheer Babu and Aditi Rao Hydari (in her Telugu debut) in lead roles. The music was composed by Vivek Sagar with cinematography by P. G. Vinda.

Released on 15 June 2018, The film is loosely inspired from the British film Notting Hill (1999), starring Julia Roberts and Hugh Grant, and My Week with Marilyn (2011). In one of the interviews Mohana Krishna told that this film's core theme also reminds the telugu hit film Bangaru babu. The film received positive response upon release, and became a profitable venture.

== Plot ==
Vijay is an aspiring children's book illustrator while his father Sarvesh's interest is in the movies. Vijay does not like movies and believes everything related to it is fake. One day, a film producer asks Sarvesh to rent his house for a film shooting in which Sameera Rathore, a well-known actress is the lead. Sarvesh in the hope of fulfilling his childhood dream of becoming an actor, immediately agrees, much to the dismay of Vijay.

As the shoot begins, the entire family except Vijay begins to relish it, despite minor inconveniences. Sameera, who cannot speak Telugu, struggles to utter her dialogues. She upon noticing that the family is making fun of her, asks Vijay to be her language tutor, and he agrees. In order to stay away from the film's lead actor Kishore Babu, Sameera spends more time with Vijay and his family. Vijay realizes that Sameera is not the type of film star he thought would be and eventually falls for her. Later, the shooting in the house is wrapped up and Sameera leaves.

A few days later, Vijay who is madly in love with Sameera, visits her shooting locale in Manali and confesses his love. Sameera softly rejects his proposal telling him she never had such feelings. Disappointed Vijay leaves the place. Meanwhile, the film shot in their house releases. Sarvesh's promised role is trimmed out and the words which Vijay emotionally shares with Sameera are used as dialogue without his consent. In addition, Sameera also claims on a TV show that she wrote that dialogue herself. Furious Vijay calls up the show right away with a fake name and asks Sameera to tell the truth but she doesn't. Sameera, who seemingly realizes that it was Vijay who called on the show, arrives at his house to patch up with him. But Vijay harshly rejects her.

Days later, Vijay hears that Sameera fell off from her building and is critically wounded and hospitalized. Vijay goes to the hospital, where he meets Sameera's manager. She explains to him that Sameera's friend Amit Malhotra is responsible for her situation. Amit and Sameera started together as budding actors but unlike Sameera, Amit never got his break. Amit preyed on Sameera's success and eventually grew jealous of her. Though Sameera tried to keep him away, he always found a way to harass Sameera. Amidst the situation, Sameera found peace when Vijay's on her side and genuinely loved him. When Amit found that Sameera is in love with someone, he wows to kill him. Following this, Sameera tries her best to hide Vijay's identity from Amit.

One day, Amit arrives at Sameera's home with a Bollywood film offer for both of them on the condition that Sameera spends a night with the producer of the film. He also blackmails Sameera that he would ruin her career by releasing her past videos to the media. Upon hearing this, Sameera slaps him in anger and Amit slaps her back, inadvertently throwing her out of the balcony. Vijay also learns that it was the writer of the film who stole the dialogue when Sameera explained to him the true meaning of love in Vijay's words.

Vijay, realizing that he misunderstood Sameera all along, plans to teach Amit a lesson. Vijay, his friends and his father frighten Amit by threatening to murder him if he continues to harass Sameera. They retrieve the photos and videos, and ask him to leave for Mumbai.

On the same evening, a recovered Sameera arrives as the chief guest to Vijay's children's book launch. There, Vijay apologizes and proposes to Sameera again which she happily accepts. Later, Sarvesh bags a role in an upcoming film, while Vijay's mother gets a call from a big production company for her catering services. Sameera and Vijay are then seen on the terrace talking intimately and looking very much in love with each other.

== Cast ==
- Sudheer Babu as Vijay
- Aditi Rao Hydari as Sameera Rathore
- Naresh as Sarvesh "Sarva", Vijay's father
- Pavithra Lokesh as Anasuya, Vijay's mother
- Harshini as Divya, Vijay's sister
- Tanikella Bharani as Shyam Prasad
- Amit Purohit as Amit Malhotra
- Rahul Ramakrishna as Murthy, Vijay's friend
- Abhay Bethiganti as Seenu, Vijay's friend
- Hari Teja as Ramya, Sameera's assistant
- Nandu as Kishore Babu
- Kedar Shankar as Kishore Babu's father
- Shishir Sharma as an actor
- Vamsi Raghava Yenumula as Venkat
- John Kottoly as Surya - Director
- Appaji Ambarisha Darbha as Acting Coach

Cameo appearances

- Srinivas Avasarala as himself
- Harish Shankar as himself
- Tharun Bhascker as himself

== Music ==
The soundtrack is composed by Vivek Sagar and released by Aditya Music.

Sammohanam

Soundtrack album by Vivek Sagar
- Released: May 12, 2018
- Recorded: 2018
- Genre: Feature film soundtrack
- Length: 18:05
- Label: Aditya Music
- Producer: Vivek Sagar

Vivek Sagar chronology
Yuddham Sharanam (2017)	Sammohanam (2018)	Ee Nagaraniki Emaindhi (2018)

Track list
No.	Title	Lyrics	Singer(s)	Length
1.	"Oohalu Oorege Gaalanthaa"	Sirivennela Seetharama Sastry	Haricharan, Keerthana	4:59
2.	"Manasainadedo"	Indraganti Srikantha Sarma	Vivek Sagar	4:05
3.	"O Cheli Thaara"	Ramajogayya Sastry	Haricharan	4:47
4.	"Kanulalo Thadigaa"	Ramajogayya Sastry	Chaitra Ambadipudi	4:14
Total length:				18:05

== Reception ==
=== Critical reception ===
Srivathsan Nadadhur in his review for The Hindu praised the performances and direction and says, "Sammohanam works because its characters are vulnerable and human. Their flaws boost the character arcs." Hemanth Kumar writing for The First Post praised the performance of the lead actors, "Aditi Rao Hydari, Sudheer Babu are terrific in this simple, sweet love story", he stated. Kumar however, pointed out that the screenplay loses its pace in the latter half. Priyanka Sundar of Hindustan Times rating the film three out of five stars appreciated the film for its well-written characters.

Janani K. of India Today while appreciating the performances also writes that "Sammohanam goes off track towards the second half, falling short of becoming the 'best' film" The Indian Express journalist Manoj Kumar R rating the film two-and-a-half stars out of five, opined that though it has its "magical moments", the film falls short of "rising above its own limitations." The Times of India critic Suhas Yellapantula rated 2.5/5 and wrote: "The flashes of brilliance are overshadowed by a predictable storyline and by the time the climax is over, the only feeling you're left with is one of disappointment."

=== Box office ===
Sammohanam grossed ₹5 crore in the first week and ended up collecting over ₹15 crore in full theatrical run.

== Awards and nominations ==
Date of ceremony	Award	Category	Recipient(s) and nominee(s)	Result	Ref.
6 January 2019	Zee Cine Awards Telugu	Best Debut-Female	Aditi Rao Hydari	Won	
6 January 2019	Zee Cine Awards Telugu	Entertainer of the Year	Sudheer Babu	Won	
17 February 2019	TSR – TV9 National Film Awards	Special Jury Award	Aditi Rao Hydari	Won	
15 & 16 August 2019	SIIMA Film Awards	Best Director – Telugu	Indraganti Mohan Krishna	Nominated	
15 & 16 August 2019	SIIMA Film Awards	Best Actor – Telugu	Sudheer Babu	Nominated	
15 & 16 August 2019	SIIMA Film Awards	Best Actress – Telugu	Aditi Rao Hydari	Nominated	
15 & 16 August 2019	SIIMA Film Awards	Best Actor in a Supporting Role	Naresh	Nominated	
15 & 16 August 2019	SIIMA Film Awards	Special Jury Award - Telugu	Sudheer Babu	Won	
21 December 2019	Filmfare Awards South	Best Film – Telugu	Sammohanam	Nominated	
21 December 2019	Filmfare Awards South	Best Director – Telugu	Mohan Krishna Indraganti	Nominated	
21 December 2019	Filmfare Awards South	Best Actress – Telugu	Aditi Rao Hydari	Nominated	
21 December 2019	Filmfare Awards South	Best Supporting Actor – Telugu	Naresh	Nominated	
21 December 2019	Filmfare Awards South	Best Music Director – Telugu	Vivek Sagar	Nominated	
