= Vishwak Sen =

Indian actor, director, screenwriter (born 1995)

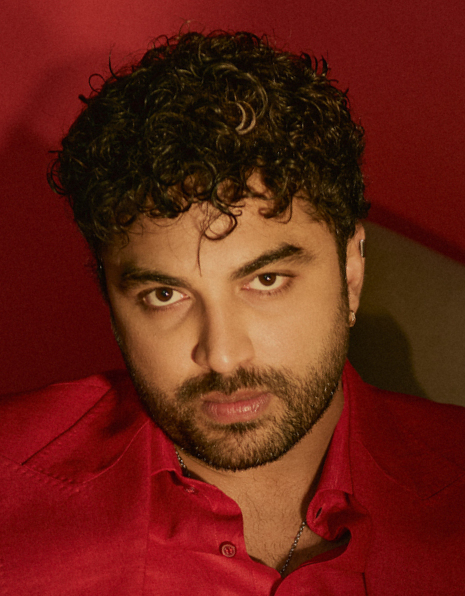
- Sen in 2025
- Born: Dinesh Naidu; 29 March 1995 (age 31); Hyderabad, Andhra Pradesh (now in Telangana), India
- Occupations: Actor; director; screenwriter
- Years active: 2009; 2017–present

Vishwak Sen (born Dinesh Naidu on 29 March 1995) is an Indian actor, director, editor and screenwriter who works in Telugu cinema. He made his debut as a lead actor in 2017 with the film Vellipomakey. He made his debut as a director in 2019 with the film Falaknuma Das. His notable works are Ee Nagaraniki Emaindhi (2018), HIT: The First Case (2020), Ashoka Vanamlo Arjuna Kalyanam (2022), Ori Devuda (2022), Gaami (2024) and his second directorial, Das Ka Dhamki (2023).

== Early life ==
Vishwak Sen was born as Dinesh Naidu on 29 March 1995 in Hyderabad, India. He changed his name to Vishwak Sen prior to entering the film industry, as per numerology, on the suggestion of his father, who believed he would never achieve success with his birth name.

== Career ==
Vishwak Sen made his acting debut with Bangaru Babu (2009) and his lead acting debut with Vellipomakey (2017). The latter was released to above-average reviews, and a reviewer from The Times of India stated that "Vishwak Sen does a good job at playing Chandu and is a natural". In 2018, he starred in Ee Nagaraniki Emaindhi, directed by Tharun Bhascker Dhaassyam of Pelli Choopulu fame. The film received positive reviews upon release and was a success at the box office. Sen made his directorial debut with Falaknuma Das (2019), a remake of Angamaly Diaries. The film was released to mixed reviews, but the depiction of Old City, Hyderabad, was praised. His next film was HIT: The First Case (2020), produced by actor Nani. HIT was released to positive reviews from critics. In 2021 he starred in Paagal alongside Nivetha Pethuraj, which received mixed reviews from critics. In May 2022, he starred in Ashoka Vanamlo Arjuna Kalyanam. In October 2022, he starred in Ori Devuda along with Mithila Palkar and Asha Bhat. It is a remake of the Tamil film Oh My Kadavule. The film garnered decent to mixed reviews from critics praising the performances and storyline of the film. In March 2023, his second directorial film Das Ka Dhamki, starring himself in a dual role, was released to mixed reviews from critics with praise towards Vishwak Sen's performance, music, action sequences, and cinematography. He was next seen in Boo, which premiered on JioCinema. In 2024, he starred in Gaami as an Aghora and the film opened up to positive reviews.

== Filmography ==
Key
†	Denotes films that have not yet been released

- All films are in Telugu, unless otherwise noted.

List of Vishwak Sen film credits
Year	Title	Role	Notes	Ref.
2009	Bangaru Babu	Smoking boy	Child actor	
2017	Vellipomakey	Chandrasekhar "Chandu"	Debut as lead actor	
2018	Ee Nagaraniki Emaindhi	Vivek		
2019	Falaknuma Das	Das	Also director, writer, and co-producer	
2020	HIT: The First Case	SP Vikram Rudraraju IPS		
2021	Paagal	Prem		
2022	Ashoka Vanamlo Arjuna Kalyanam	Arjun Kumar Allam		
2022	Ori Devuda	Arjun Durgaraju		
2022	Mukhachitram	Advocate Viswamitra	Extended cameo appearance	
2023	Das Ka Dhamki	Krishna Das and Dr. Sanjay Rudra	Dual role; also director, writer and producer	
2023	Boo	Aakash	Simultaneously shot in Tamil	
2024	Gaami	Shankar		
2024	Gangs of Godavari	Lankala Ratnakar alias "Tiger" Ratna		
2024	Mechanic Rocky	Nagumomu Rakesh "Rocky" and Nagireddeppa	Dual role	
2025	Laila	Sonu Model (Laila)		
2026	Funky	Komal		
2026	Cult	DSP Sankalp Nayak IPS	Also director and writer	
2026	ENE Repeat	Vivek		
2026	Legacy †	TBA	Filming	

== Accolades ==
List of Vishwak Sen awards and nominations
Year	Title	Award	Category	Result	Ref.
2018	Vellipomakey	7th South Indian International Movie Awards	Best Male Debut – Telugu	Nominated	
2019	Ee Nagaraniki Emaindhi	17th Santosham Film Awards	Best Debut Actor	Won	
2021	Falaknuma Das	20th Santosham Film Awards	Best Debut Director	Won	
2021	Falaknuma Das	9th South Indian International Movie Awards	Best Debut Director – Telugu	Nominated	
2023	Das Ka Dhamki	22nd Santosham Film Awards	Best Villain	Won	
