= Santhana Prapthirasthu =

2025 Indian Telugu film by Sanjeev Reddy

- Theatrical release poster
- Directed by: Sanjeev Reddy
- Written by: Sanjeev Reddy; Sheik Dawood G
- Produced by: Madhura Sreedhar Reddy; Nirvi Hari Prasada Reddy
- Starring: Vikranth Reddy; Chandini Chowdary
- Cinematography: Mahi Reddy Pandugula
- Edited by: Sai Krishna Ganala
- Music by: Score; Ajay Arasada; Songs; Sunil Kashyap; Ajay Arasada
- Production companies: Madhura Entertainment; Nirvi Arts
- Release date: 14 November 2025
- Running time: 140 minutes
- Country: India
- Language: Telugu

Santhana Prapthirasthu is a 2025 Indian Telugu-language romantic comedy drama film co-written and directed by Sanjeev Reddy. Produced by Madhura Sreedhar Reddy and Nirvi Hariprasad Reddy, the film features Vikranth Reddy, and Chandini Chowdary in lead roles, alongside Vennela Kishore, Tharun Bhascker, Abhinav Gomatam and Muralidhar Goud in supporting roles.

The film was released on 14 November 2025.

== Plot ==
The story follows Chaitanya, a shy and soft-spoken software engineer who secretly marries Kalyani despite her father's disapproval. After settling into married life, the couple decides to start a family. Their plans take an unexpected turn when Chaitanya discovers that he has a low sperm count. This revelation leads to a mix of humorous, chaotic, and emotional situations involving eccentric doctors, concerned family members, and quirky friends. Despite the sensitive subject of male fertility, the film treats the theme with a light, family-friendly comedic tone, focusing on acceptance, love, and togetherness.

== Cast ==
- Vikranth Reddy as Chaitanya
- Chandini Chowdary as Kalyani
- Vennela Kishore as Dr. Bhramaram
- Tharun Bhascker as Jack Reddy
- Abhinav Gomatam as Subbu, Chaitanya’s friend
- Muralidhar Goud as Eshwar Rao, Kalyani’s father
- Aamani as Rajeshwari, Kalyani’s mother
- Harsha Vardhan as Chaitanya’s brother-in-law
- Bindu Chandramouli as Chaitanya’s sister
- Jeevan Kumar Naidu as Wignan Kumar, Chaitanya’s boss
- Anil Geela as Nandi, Eshwar Rao’s house-help
- Satya Krishnan as Dr Padmavathi, Fertility Doctor
- Thagubothu Ramesh as Soumya Kumar, Drunkard
- Kireeti Damaraju as Rakesh, Shanti’s husband
- Bhavana Sagi as Priyanka, Chaitanya’s office colleague
- Trishool Jeethuri as Sai, Chaitanya’s office colleague
- Abhay Bethiganti as Chaitanya’s college friend
- Saddam as Hospital Attendant
- Rashi Singh as Shanthi, Chaitanya’s College Crush (cameo appearance)

== Music ==
The background score and one song is composed by Ajay Arasada, whilst all the remaining songs are composed by Sunil Kashyap.

Track listing
| No. | Title | Lyrics | Singer(s) | Length |
|---|---|---|---|---|
| 1. | "Naalo Edho" | Sreejo | Aditi Bhavaraju | 4:00 |
| 2. | "Anukundhokati Le Ayyindhokati Le" | Balavardhan | Vennela Kishore | 3:29 |
| 3. | "Telusa Nee Kosame" (Composed by Ajay Arasada) | Sri Mani | Armaan Malik | 4:09 |
| 4. | "Santhana PrapthiRasthu Shubhamasthu" | Kasarla Shyam | Ram Miriyala | 3:36 |
| 5. | "Mari Mari" | Uma Vanguri | Hesham Abdul Wahab | 4:15 |

== Release ==
Santhana Prapthirasthu was released on 14 November 2025. It was released on Amazon Prime Video and JioHotstar on 19 December 2025.

== Reception ==
Bhawana Tanmayi of Moneycontrol gave the movie 3 out of 5 stars and mentioned that the movie is a fun yet sensible way to talk about a serious issue. Suhas Sistu from The Hans India appreciated the film's balance of humour and awareness while rating it 3/5. Sandeep Athreya of Sakshi Post gave it 3/5 stars and praised the performances and comedy aspects.

Suresh Kavirayani of The New Indian Express rated the film 2.5 out of 5 and stated, "Santhana Prapthirasthu is a neat attempt to present the theme of infertility in a light, entertaining manner." The Hindu felt that, "with tighter writing and sharper editing", the film's ideas could have landed far better.
