= Rahul Ramakrishna =

Indian film actor, writer

- Born: 15 January 1991 (age 35); Secunderabad, Telangana, India
- Occupations: Actor, singer, lyricist, journalist
- Years active: 2014–present

Rahul Ramakrishna (born 15 January 1991) is an Indian actor, writer and journalist. He made his debut with the short film, Sainma. He became popular with his role in the 2017 Telugu film, Arjun Reddy.

== Early life ==
Rahul Ramakrishna was born in Hyderabad, Telangana. His father was a yoga instructor and his mother is an assistant editor for a business magazine. He studied mechanical engineering in VJIT but discontinued it after second year.

== Career ==
Rahul Ramakrishna worked as a journalist in evening dailies, Post Noon and Metro India. He also worked as a translator for journalists visiting Hyderabad on assignments. Along with a short stint as a film review writer for a Hindustan Times affiliated website, Rahul did many varied odd jobs, as a songwriter, screenwriter, and as a presenter for a television cook show.

=== Film career ===
Rahul's affiliation with acting began as a theatre enthusiast where he worked with several theatre groups as part of their production crew. According to his interviews, Rahul developed a keen interest in acting after a workshop with playwright and activist N Madhusudan and Dr. Sagari Ramdas, both of whom Rahul credits as his teachers and guides. His first attempt at acting was in a short film, Sainma directed by Tharun Bhascker Dhaassyam. Following the appreciation that poured in both for the film's attempt and aesthetics and for the acting prowess of the entire cast, he signed up to play the main lead's supporting friend in a comic role in the Telugu film, Jayammu Nischayammu Raa starring Srinivasa Reddy and Poorna directed by Sivaraju Kanumuri.

After this, Rahul shot to fame as Shiva, in the film Arjun Reddy, where his character's unwavering loyalty to the lead's combined with wit and emotional support garnered him a massive fan following in the audience and the film fraternity alike.

The success of Arjun Reddy and the widespread recognition furthered his career with instrumental characters in Telugu films of 2018 such as Bharat Ane Nenu, Sammohanam, Chi La Sow. Rahul repeated his "hero's best friend" role and combination with actor Vijay Deverakonda in the film Geetha Govindam. In 2020 he appeared in Ala Vaikunthapurramuloo.

In late 2018, Rahul announced that he will be marrying his girlfriend, however, he later postponed the marriage citing busy work schedules.

== Filmography ==
Key
†	Denotes films that have not yet been released

=== As Actor ===
Year	Film	Role	Notes
2014	Sainma	Ramu	Short film
2016	Jayammu Nischayammu Raa	Yadagiri	Also dialogue writer
2016	Sheeshmahal	Filmmaker	
2017	Arjun Reddy	Shiva	
2018	Inttelligent	Rahul	
2018	Bharat Ane Nenu	Ramana	
2018	Sammohanam	Murthy	
2018	Chi La Sow	Police Officer	
2018	Geetha Govindam	Ramakrishna	
2018	Husharu	Raj Bollam	
2018	Mithai	Sai	
2019	Kalki	Deva Dutta	
2019	Brochevarevarura	Rambo	
2020	Ala Vaikunthapurramuloo	Ravindra	
2020	Pressure Cooker	Chandrasekhar	
2020	Guvva Gorinka		Amazon Prime Video film
2021	A1 Express	Rahul	
2021	Jathi Ratnalu	Jogipet Ravi	
2021	Y	Baalu	Aha film
2021	Shaadi Mubarak	Driver	
2021	Paagal	Youth leader	
2021	Net	Lakshman	
2021	Republic	Mani	
2021	Skylab	Subedar Ramarao	
2022	RRR	Lacchu	
2022	Virata Parvam	Vennela's cousin	
2022	Ante Sundaraniki	Dr. Guruvesh	
2022	Happy Birthday	Gunda	
2022	Krishna Vrinda Vihari	Krishna's colleague	
2022	Ori Devuda	God's Assistant	
2023	Intinti Ramayanam	Seenu	
2023	Vimanam	Koti	
2023	Kushi	RK	
2024	Om Bheem Bush	Madhav Relangi	
2024	Manamey	Ramulu	
2025	Andhra King Taluka	Eshwar	

=== As Lyricist ===
- Sainma (2014)
- Pelli Choopulu (2016)
- Keedaa Cola (2023)

== Television ==
Year	Title	Role	Channel/Platform	Notes
2016	Wow Emi Ruchi	Host/Chef	ETV Abhiruchi	
2017	Story Discussion	Rahul	Avanti Cinema	Also singer for "Rangu Rangula Sitralanni"
2018	Gangstars	Red	Amazon Prime Video	
2018	Nirudyoga Natulu	Himself	Avanti Cinema	Cameo appearance in the Season Finale

== Awards and nominations ==
Year	Award	Category	Film	Result	Ref.
2018	SIIMA	Best Comedian (Telugu)	Arjun Reddy	Won	
2019	Filmfare Awards South	Best Supporting Actor – Telugu	Geetha Govindam	Nominated	
2020	Zee Cine Awards Telugu	Best Comedian	Brochevarevarura	Won	
2021	SIIMA	Best Comedian	Brochevarevarura	Nominated	
