= Paagal =

2021 film by Naresh Kuppili

- Theatrical release poster
- Directed by: Naresh Kuppili
- Produced by: Bekkem Venugopal; Dil Raju
- Starring: Vishwak Sen; Nivetha Pethuraj; Murali Sharma
- Cinematography: S. Manikandan
- Edited by: Garry BH
- Music by: Radhan; Leon James (1 song)
- Production companies: Sri Venkateswara Creations; Lucky Media
- Release date: 14 August 2021
- Running time: 138 minutes
- Country: India
- Language: Telugu
- Box office: est. ₹20.60 crore

Paagal (transl. Crazy) is a 2021 Indian Telugu-language romantic comedy film written and directed by debutante Naresh Kuppili and produced by Bekkem Venugopal under the banner of Lucky Media. The film stars Vishwak Sen, Nivetha Pethuraj, and Murali Sharma, while Simran Choudhary, Megha Lekha, Indraja Shankar, and Mahesh Achanta play supporting roles and Bhumika Chawla makes a cameo appearance. The release was postponed multiple times due to the COVID-19 pandemic in India. The film was released on 14 August 2021 and was a moderate success at the box office.

== Plot ==
Prem's Pursuit narrates the story of Prem, an 8-year-old boy who loses his mother to cancer. Grieving her loss, Prem seeks guidance from his friend Mahesh, who advises him to seek love as a source of comfort.

Prem embarks on a journey to find love but faces rejection at every attempt. Despite setbacks, he persists, driven by memories of his mother's affection. His pursuit leads him through a series of encounters, each offering lessons about love, resilience, and human relationships.

From failed proposals to fleeting romances, Prem's journey is marked by heartache and disappointment. Yet, he learns the value of determination and self-improvement. Through hard work, he secures a promising career and continues his search for a soulmate.

In his quest, Prem encounters Radha, a woman in need of rescue from a menacing gang. Despite challenges, their bond grows, tested by past traumas and misunderstandings. Prem navigates complexities of love, drawn to unexpected circumstances and candidates.

As Prem faces adversity, he shows courage and compassion, finding redemption in unexpected places. Themes of love, loss, and forgiveness are explored with depth and nuance. Through his journey, Prem learns about the true meaning of love and the importance of forgiveness.

Prem's Pursuit resonates with audiences, portraying grief and hope with sensitivity. It offers a message of love, forgiveness, and embracing life's journey.

== Cast ==
- Vishwak Sen as Prem
- Nivetha Pethuraj as Theera
- Murali Sharma as MLA Raja Reddy "Raji"
- Simran Choudhary as Sofie
- Megha Lekha as Radha
- Indraja Shankar as Baby
- Mahesh Achanta as Mahesh
- Rahul Ramakrishna as Youth Leader
- Auto Ram Prasad
- Bhumika Chawla as Prem's deceased mother (cameo appearance)

== Production ==
=== Development and casting ===
Producer Bekkem Venugopal on 19 March 2020 announced the launch of their project titled Paagal with Vishwak Sen in the lead role and directed by debutant Naresh Kuppili. The film's crew members also included music director Radhan, cinematographer Manikandan and editor Garry BH. A pooja ceremony coinciding with a formal launch event was held on the same day, however production was delayed due to the COVID-19 pandemic lockdown in India. On her scenes in the film, Nivetha Pethuraj told that "Firstly I was not asked for on screen kiss for the film by the director. The script is so beautiful just the way it is."

=== Filming ===
Principal photography commenced on 21 September 2020, post government permitted to resume film shootings adhering to the COVID-19 protocol. Initially he did not want to resume shooting for the film along with the sequel for HIT: The First Case, with limited crew members as the scripts of both films demand a larger team. However, with a change of mind, he decided to go on with the shooting procedure with all necessary safety precautions. Vishwak joined the film's shooting sets in November 2020. With major portions being filmed in Hyderabad, the team headed to Pondicherry for a special song shoot at the end of November. Shooting for the film was wrapped up in December 2020. Sen completed his portions of dubbing in May 2021.

== Soundtrack ==
Paagal

Soundtrack album by Radhan and Leon James
- Released: 14 August 2021 (Jukebox)
- Genre: Feature film soundtrack
- Length: 31:43
- Language: Telugu
- Label: Aditya Music
- Producers: Radhan; Leon James

Radhan chronology
Jathi Ratnalu (2021)	Paagal (2021)	Adbhutham (2021)
External audio
- Audio Jukebox on YouTube

Leon James chronology
Oh My Kadavule (2020)	Paagal (2021)	Ori Devuda (2022)

Singles from Paagal
- 1. "Paagal" Released: 10 March 2021; 2. "Saradaga Kasepaina" Released: 31 March 2021; 3. "Ee Single Chinnode" Released: 2 June 2021; 4. "Aagave Nuvvagave" Released: 11 August 2021; 5. "Kanapadava" Released: 13 August 2021

The film's soundtrack is composed by Radhan and released by Aditya Music label. The first single from the film – the titular track was released on 10 March 2021. The song had lyrics written by Chandrabose and sung by Ram Miriyala. The second single "Saradaga Kasepaina" sung by Karthik and Purnima, with lyrics written by Ananta Sriram was released on 31 March 2021. The third single "Ee Single Chinnode" sung by Benny Dayal, with lyrics written by Krishna Kanth, was released on 2 June 2021. Full video version of the first track "Paagal" was released on 8 August 2021. The fourth single "Aagave Nuvvagave" was sung by Sid Sriram with the lyrics written by Krishna Kanthh was released on 11 August 2021. Another track "Kanapadava" was composed by Leon James and was sung by Anand Aravindakshan with the lyrics written by Prasanna Kumar Bezawada was released on 13 August 2021. Soundtrack album was released on 14 August 2021.

A critic of Asianet News Telugu felt that soundtrack and film score are the highlights of the film. Another critic too opined the same and felt that film score composed by James, elevates the scenes.

Track listing
No.	Title	Lyrics	Music	Singer(s)	Length
1.	"Paagal"	Chandrabose	Radhan	Ram Miriyala, Mama Sing	3:10
2.	"Saradaga Kasepaina"	Ananta Sriram	Radhan	Karthik, Purnima	4:41
3.	"Ee Single Chinnode"	Krishna Kanth	Radhan	Benny Dayal	4:01
4.	"Aagave Nuvvagave"	Krishna Kanth	Radhan	Sid Sriram	6:02
5.	"Amma Amma Nee Vennela"	Ramajoggaya Sastry	Radhan	Sid Sriram, Veda, Vagdevi	5:32
6.	"Enno Enneno Vinnam Gaani"	Anantha Sriram	Radhan	Anthony Daasan	2:37
7.	"You Are My Love"	Simran	Radhan	Rahul Sipligunj	2:54
8.	"Kanapadava (Male Version)"	Prasanna Kumar Bezawada	Leon James	Anand Aravindakshan	1:21
9.	"Kanapadava (Female Version)"	Prasanna Kumar Bezawada	Leon James	Sameera Bharadwaj	1:21
Total length:					31:43

== Release ==
Dil Raju announced co-producing and presenting the film under the banner Sri Venkateswara Creations in February 2021. At the film's first look poster which released on 2 February 2021, the team announced a release date of 30 April 2021. However, on 18 March 2021, a new release date of 1 May 2021 was announced. The film was again postponed due to the second wave of the COVID-19 pandemic.

=== Marketing ===
As a part of a promotional strategy, the filmmakers announced that the trailer of the film will be screened only in theatres and will not be released online, despite the film's teaser which released online on 18 February 2021. Furthermore, the team planned for a 15-day promotional tour across Andhra Pradesh and Telangana as a part of the marketing purposes.

=== Home media ===
The film's digital rights were sold to Amazon Prime Video and it was premiered on 3 September 2021.

== Reception ==
Paagal received generally negative reviews criticizing the storyline, screenplay, and dragged narration, but praising Vishwak Sen's performance and the soundtrack.

Neeshita Nyayapati of The Times of India gave a rating of 2.5 out of 5, and stated that "Paagal is an over-drawn yet quirky love story with a flimsy storyline guiding you through it. And does have its redeemable qualities though." Sangeetha Devi Dundoo of The Hindu called it "bizarre romcom drama" and felt that "The story idea of a man seeking mother’s love from his life partner is contrived; it’s time the on-screen lover boys get real and grow up."

A reviewer from The Hans India rated the film 2.5 out of 5, and praised performances of the cast, Sen in particlular. They, however, criticized the slow-placed narration and screenplay, writing "Overall, 'Paagal' is an average film with the same old storyline blended with some decent comedy scenes. Sakshi's Anji Shetty opined that acting performances of lead actors, music and cinematography are its positives, while film's screenplay is its negative. Eenadu criticized the film's screenplay and praised Vishwak's performance, film score and cinematography.

In its review, NTV stated – "‘Paagal’ has got a strong premise. But the narration is too misguided to save the story from seeming frivolous." Deccan Chronicle called it "a half-baked romcom", adding that the film is "cheesy, unnatural, half-baked bag of borrowings".
