= Keedaa Cola =

- Theatrical release poster
- Directed by: Tharun Bhascker
- Written by: Tharun Bhascker; Pranay Koppala; Shanthan Raj; Ramya Kakumanu
- Produced by: K. Vivek Sudhanshu; Saikrishna Gadwal; Srinivas Kaushik Nanduri; Sripad Nandiraj; Upendra Varma; Rana Daggubati (presenter)
- Starring: Chaitanya Rao Madadi; Rag Mayur; Brahmanandam; Tharun Bhascker; Jeevan Kumar; Vishnu Oi; Ravindra Vijay; Raghu Ram
- Cinematography: AJ Aaron
- Edited by: Upendra Varma
- Music by: Vivek Sagar
- Production company: VG Sainma
- Distributed by: Suresh Productions
- Release date: 3 November 2023
- Country: India
- Language: Telugu
- Budget: ₹15 crore
- Box office: ₹16 crore

Keedaa Cola is a 2023 Indian Telugu-language crime-comedy film, co-written and directed by Tharun Bhascker. It stars Chaitanya Rao Madadi, Rag Mayur, Brahmanandam, Tharun Bhascker, Jeevan Kumar, Vishnu Oi, Ravindra Vijay and Raghu Ram in the main roles. The music was composed by Vivek Sagar.

It was released on 3 November 2023 to mixed reviews from the critics. It started streaming on Aha from 29 December 2023. it was an average at the box office

== Cast ==
- Chaitanya Rao Madadi as Vaasthu
- Rag Mayur as Adv. Kaushik "Lancham", Vaasthu's friend
- Brahmanandam as Varadaraju, Vaasthu's grandfather
- Tharun Bhascker as Bhakta Naidu alias Naidu Anna
- Jeevan Kumar as Jeevan Naidu
- Vishnu Oi as Sikander
- Ravindra Vijay as CEO
- Raghu Ram as Shots, CEO's fixer
- Muralidhar Goud

== Soundtrack ==
The music was composed by Vivek Sagar.

Keedaa Cola

Soundtrack album by Vivek Sagar
- Released: 2023
- Genre: Feature film soundtrack
- Length: 31:24
- Language: Telugu
- Label: Saregama

Vivek Sagar chronology
Neetho (2022)	Keedaa Cola (2023)
External audio
- Keedaa Cola – Jukebox Side A on YouTube

Track listing
No.	Title	Lyrics	Singer(s)	Length
1.	"Dipiri Dipiri"	Bharadwaj Gali	Hanuman Ch	4:09
2.	"Bring It On"	Vivek Athreya	Ram Miriyala	3:49
3.	"Kayyala Chindhata"	Niklesh Sunkoji	Hemachandra	4:10
4.	"Swaasa Meedha Dhyaasa"	Bharadwaj Gali	Jassie Gift	3:48
5.	"Chikkadpally Centre"	Niklesh Sunkoji	Kandukoori Shankar Babu	3:15
6.	"Sakkani Bomma"	Rahul Ramakrishna	Vivek Sagar	3:28
7.	"Emantivi Emantivi"	Kittu Vissapragada	Mohana Bhogaraju	3:00
8.	"Pattana O Pattu"	Bharadwaj Gali	Sri Krishna and Malavika	1:35
9.	"Naa Saavu Nen Sastha"	Vivek Sagar	Sahithi Chaganti	1:58
10.	"The Rage of Jeevan"	Bharadwaj Gali	Smaran	1:55
Total length:				31:24

== Reception ==
Janani K. of India Today gave it 3 out of 5 stars and wrote, "Though Keedaa Cola is predictable, it still remains to be a fun and entertaining watch". Paul Nicodemus of The Times of India gave it 3 out of 5 stars and wrote, "A philosophical quest wrapped in quirkiness!"

Raghu Bandi of The Indian Express gave it 2.5 out of 5 stars and noted that, "Tharun Bhascker’s Keedaa Cola is a fine comedy if you go in with no expectations and are ready to accept a few zany characters and outlandish settings".

Sangeetha Devi Dundoo of The Hindu wrote, "There's plenty to root for in Tharun Bhascker Dhaassyam's Telugu caper comedy Keedaa Cola, packed with oddball characters and unexpected situations". On the contrary, a critic from NTV wrote that "While the team wanted to deliver a satire, they just delivered an obsession of ideas that don’t really sit together. Movie could have been a fun screwball dark comedy had the characters had been connectible. Tharun seems to have gone for Japanese weird style dark comedy but it fizzed off by the end".
