= Cult (2026 Telugu film) =

2026 Indian film by Vishwak Sen

#Cult
- Theatrical release poster
- Directed by: Vishwak Sen
- Screenplay by: Vishwak Sen
- Dialogues by: Tharun Bhascker
- Story by: Vishwak Sen
- Produced by: Sandeep Kakarala; Karate Raju
- Starring: Vishwak Sen; Gayatri Bhardwaj; Tarak Ponnappa
- Cinematography: Aravind Viswanathan
- Edited by: Ravi Teja Girijala
- Music by: Ravi Basrur
- Production companies: Tarak Cinemas LLP; Vanmaye Creations
- Distributed by: see below
- Release date: 30 October 2026
- Running time: 152 minutes
- Country: India
- Language: Telugu
- Box office: ₹6.47 crore

Cult stylised as #CULT is an 2026 Indian Telugu-language psychological thriller slasher film written and directed by Vishwak Sen. The film is produced by Tarak Cinemas LLP and Vanmaye Creations, and stars Vishwak Sen, Gayatri Bhardwaj and Tarak Ponnappa. The film follows three friends who crash a party thrown by a politician’s son, only to find themselves caught up in chaos.

This film was officially announced on 11 May 2025, and principal photography began on the same day. Filming wrapped on 5 October 2026. The film’s score was composed by Ravi Basrur, with cinematography by Arvind Vishwanathan and editing by Ravi Teja Girijala.

#Cult theatrically released on 30 October 2026. It received mixed to negative reviews from critics.

== Cast ==
- Vishwak Sen as DSP Sankalp Nayak IPS
- Gayatri Bhardwaj as Maya
- Tarak Ponnappa as Elvin
- Murali Sharma as Minister of Home Affairs
- Srikanth Iyengar as Commissioner
- Karthikeya
- Anirudh Bhaskar
- EZY
- Yagnya Turlapati
- Kabeer Bhartiya
- Vishak Nair
- Chepuri Vivek

== Production ==
In 11 May 2025, Tarak Cinemas and Vanmaye Creations announced a collaboration to produce the film #Cult, which will be directed by and star Vishwak Sen, marking his third directorial feature. in the same day, the film’s principal photography officially commenced, following a launch ceremony held at Ramanaidu Studios and presided over by producer Allu Aravind. With dialogue written by Tharun Bhascker, the film is set to be released in five languages, Telugu, Hindi, Japanese, Spanish, and English, with the aim of reaching a broader international audience. Reportedly, this film is a party-set thriller inspired by true events. The film is the makers by its producers as "India's first slasher film."

Sen stated that he initially invited Tazuddin to direct the film. However, following a string of box-office failures, Sen decided to take responsibility himself and opted to direct #Cult personally.

In addition to Sen, the cast now includes Gayatri Bhardwaj, Tarak Ponnapa, Murali Sharma, Srikanth Iyengar, Karthikeya, Anirudh Bhaskar, EZY, Yagnya Turlapati, Kabeer Bhartiya, Vishak Nair, and Chepuri Vivek. The film’s score was composed by Ravi Basrur, with cinematography by Arvind Vishwanathan and editing by Ravi Teja Girijala. Aravind Mule as the production designer, Karunakar and Joshua are the stunt choreographers on the film. To show his appreciation for Ravi Basrur’s contributions, Sen gifted him a gold Rolex watch worth approximately ₹35 lakh.

Nearly 150 professional actors took part in the filming of this film. The makers completed their final leg of filming at Ramoji Film City. They constructed an expansive set there for key sequences, with the filming of these scenes spanning nearly 40 to 50 days. In 5 October 2026, the film wrapped production.

== Music ==
#Cult

Soundtrack album by Ravi Basrur
- Released: 3 November 2026
- Recorded: 2026
- Studios: Ravi Basrur Studio, Basrur
- Genre: Feature film soundtrack
- Length: 39:16
- Language: Telugu
- Label: Aditya Music
- Producers: Ravi Basrur, Chethan Handattu, Pavan Basrur

Ravi Basrur chronology
Drishyam: The Conclusion (2026)	#Cult (2026)	Tiki Taka (2026)
External audio
- #Cult Audio Jukebox on YouTube

Singles from Cult
- 1. "He is My Dosthi" Released: 19 July 2026

The music of the film is composed by Ravi Basrur. The first song from the film, "He Is My Dosthi", was released on 19 July 2026. All tracks on the album will be released on 3 November 2026.

Track listing
No.	Title	Lyrics	Singer(s)	Length
1.	"Change The Game"	Pavan Basrur, Santhosh Venky	Rohith Siddappa	3:52
2.	"Nijamena"	Kittu Vissapragada	Santhosh Venky, Airaa Udupi	4:14
3.	"One Rule – Game Over"	Chethan Handattu	Airaa Udupi	2:55
4.	"Where I Belong"	Chethan Handattu	Alhena Kassim	3:55
5.	"Ishan Theme"	Ravi Basrur	Ravi Basrur	1:41
6.	"Zara"	Vishwak Sen	Jonita Gandhi	3:20
7.	"Plug Fight Theme"	Ravi Basrur	Ravi Basrur	1:52
8.	"Asylum Of Ishan"	Ravi Basrur	Ravi Basrur	3:10
9.	"He is My Dosthi"	Santhosh Venky	Karthik	3:54
10.	"Coin Match"	Chethan Handattu	Pavan Basrur	2:40
11.	"Lap Dance"	Pavan Basrur	Jude Mathew	4:03
12.	"Climax Madness"	Ravi Basrur	Airaa Udupi, Khushi Basrur (Alaap & Additional Vocals)	3:34
Total length:				39:16

== Release ==
=== Theatrical ===
#Cult theatrically released on 30 October 2026. This film has been granted a A certificate by the Central Board of Film Certification (CBFC).

=== Distribution ===
The film's distributors in India include Asian Sunil (Nizam), Sri Venkateswara Creations (Visakhapatnam), Suresh Movies (East Godavari and West Godavari), Alankar Prasad (Krishna), Padmavathi Films (Guntur), Tirupathi Prasad (Ceded), Sri Vengamamba Cinemas (Nellore), Kumar Films (Karnataka). Cognier Cine Creations is handling the overseas distribution of this film. Dreamz Entertainment and Samaya Entertainment are handling the UK distribution of this film.

== Reception ==
=== Box office ===
The film’s box office performance on its opening day was disappointing, but it showed some improvement the following day. The film has reached a global box office of ₹1.51 crore over two days. The film had a dismal opening week, with a total global box office of only ₹6.47 crore.

=== Critical response ===
123telugu.com gave 2.75/5 stars and wrote "On the whole, Cult is an okayish survival thriller with some moments working in its favour. Vishwak Sen does well, and the final thirty minutes are designed well. However, the film doesn’t effectively deliver the required tension and thrills due to the underwhelming survival games, preventing it from becoming a satisfying watch."

BVS Prakash of Deccan Chronicle gave 1/5 stars and wrote "As a survival thriller, Cult should have kept audiences on the edge of their seats, making them anxious about the fate of the characters. Unfortunately, despite the gore, bloodshed, and violent sequences, the film struggles to generate the required tension." He also pointed out that while Sen excels at action sequences, his directorial skills are inconsistent.

Srivathsan Nadadhur of The Hindu finds the film’s script and execution to be merely passable, though some parts are excellent, particularly the final 40 to 45 minutes.
