= Meeku Maathrame Cheptha =

2019 Indian film by Shammeer Sultan

- Theatrical release poster
- Directed by: Shammeer Sultan
- Written by: Dialogues; Shammeer Sultan; Tharun Bhascker
- Screenplay by: Shammeer Sultan
- Produced by: Govardhan Rao Deverakonda; Vijay Deverakonda
- Starring: Tharun Bhascker; Abhinav Gomatam; Anasuya Bharadwaj; Vani Bhojan; Avantika Mishra
- Cinematography: Mathan Gunadeva
- Edited by: Sreejith Sarang
- Music by: Sivakumar
- Production company: King of the Hill Entertainment
- Distributed by: Global Cinemas (India); Freeze Frame Films (overseas)
- Release date: 1 November 2019
- Running time: 116 minutes
- Country: India
- Language: Telugu

Meeku Maathrame Cheptha (transl. I will tell only you) is a 2019 Indian Telugu-language comedy drama film written and directed by Shammeer Sultan, and produced by Vardhan Deverakonda and Vijay Deverakonda under the banner King of the Hill Entertainment. The film features Tharun Bhascker and Abhinav Gomatam in lead roles while Anasuya Bharadwaj, Vani Bhojan, and Avantika Mishra play supporting roles. The film marks the debut of Sultan as director and Deverakonda as producer, who also makes a cameo appearance.

== Premise ==
It revolves around a man who lies to his fiancée and then his friends help him cover up the lies, which leads to humorous situations.

== Cast ==
- Tharun Bhascker as Rakesh, a VJ working at a TV channel
- Abhinav Gomatam as Kamesh, Rakesh's best friend
- Vani Bhojan as Stephie, Rakesh's love interest
- Pavani Gangireddy as Jacqueline
- Anasuya Bharadwaj as Samyuktha, Rakesh's friend's sister
- Naveen George Thomas as Rakesh's friend
- Avantika Mishra as Rakesh's co-star
- Vinay Varma as Rakesh's co-star's uncle
- Vijay Devarakonda as himself in a cameo appearance

== Soundtrack ==
Meeku Maathrame Cheptha

Soundtrack album by Sivakumar
- Released: 5 October 2019
- Recorded: 2019
- Studio: Jubilee 10 Studios, Hyderabad; Trinity Waves, Chennai
- Genre: Feature film soundtrack
- Language: Telugu
- Label: Aditya Music

The soundtrack is composed by Sivakumar and lyrics by Rakendu Mouli. Shammeer Sultan and AsurA.

Track list
No.	Title	Lyrics	Singer(s)	Length
1.	"La la la"	Rakendu Mouli	Vedala Hemachandra, Krishnan Ganesan, Uma Neha	2:56
2.	"Chaalu Chaalu"	Shammeer Sultan, Rakendu Mouli	Anurag Kulkarni	3:16
3.	"Abadham"	AsurA	Chandana Raju	2:58
4.	"Mooskoni Parigethu"	Shammeer Sultan, Rakendu Mouli	Revanth Kumar	2:48
5.	"Nuvve Hero"	Shammeer Sultan, Rakendu Mouli, AsurA (Rap)	Anurag Kulkarni, Rahul Sipligunj, AsurA (Rap)	3:01

== Reception ==
Suresh Kavirayani of Deccan Chronicle rated the film 3 stars of 5, and praised the performances of the cast. "Tharun Bhascker steals the acting honours [...] Abhinav Gomatam does a fantastic job and is on par with Tharun Bhascker". The Hindu critic Y. Sunitha Cowdhary opined that though the film had situational humour and interesting dialogues, it is only entertaining in parts.

A reviewer from News18 India called the film, "Smartest Black Comedy of the Year". The reviewer rated the film 3.5/5 and stated: "There is a sneakingly sinuous feel of a Guy Ritchie crime thriller in this Telugu gamechanger of a film. Except that Ritchie's characters are more laconic."
