= Falaknuma Das =

- Theatrical release poster
- Directed by: Vishwak Sen
- Screenplay by: Vishwak Sen
- Based on: Angamaly Diaries by Lijo Jose Pellissery
- Produced by: Karate Raju
- Starring: Vishwak Sen; Saloni Mishra; Harshita Gaur; Prashanthi Charuolingah
- Cinematography: Vidya Sagar Chinta
- Edited by: Ravi Teja Girijala
- Music by: Vivek Sagar
- Production companies: Vanmaye Creations; Vishwak Sen Cinemas; Terranova Pictures; Media9 Creative Works
- Release date: 31 May 2019
- Country: India
- Language: Telugu
- Box office: est. ₹12 crores

Falaknuma Das is a 2019 Indian Telugu-language action crime film written and directed by Vishwak Sen in his directorial debut. It is based on the 2017 Malayalam film Angamaly Diaries. The film was produced by Vishwak's father, Karate Raju, under Vanmaye Creations, in association with Vishwak Sen Cinemas, Terranova Pictures, and Media9 Creative Works. The film was presented by D. Suresh Babu, under Suresh Productions. Sen starred alongside Saloni Mishra, Harshita Gaur, Prashanthi Charuolingah, Uttej, Jeevan Kumar, and Tharun Bhascker. The music was composed by Vivek Sagar with cinematography by Vidya Sagar Chinta and editing by Ravi Teja Girijala. The film released on 31 May 2019 to mixed to positive reviews and became a commercial success at the box-office.

== Plot ==
This is a story about the undesirable outcome that awaits a man with uncontrollable aggression. Das is a young man from Falaknuma, who lives with his widowed mother and sister. He always hangs out with his gang of childhood friends, who have been together since grade school. Their role models are Shankar Anna and Peg Pandu, local goons. As they grow up, they grow fond of the two miscreants, looking up to them as their mentors. Meanwhile, Das and Tina, his childhood friend, start a relationship. One day, Shankar is murdered by two gangsters named Ravi and Raju, which devastates Das and his friends. Ravi and Raju go to jail for murder, and the families of Das and his friends encourage them to move on with their lives.

Four years later, Tina has broken up with Das who gets into a serious relationship with Sakhi, who is from Germany. It is very important to Das to have a decent livelihood so that he can look acceptable to Sakhi's parents. He tries his hand at the cable business and moves on to set up a meat shop, mostly consisting of mutton, with Pandu's guidance. Ravi and Raju, the gangsters, are the wholesale meat suppliers in Faluknama. Das and his gang approach them to get their permission to set up their shop and name it after Shankar. They slowly start building their own business.

Rinku is Ravi's brother-in-law, and he gets into a fight with Das in a circumstance and wants revenge for it. Meanwhile, due to competition in their line of business, Ravi threatens Das to close shop and hurls a locally made bomb at his shop. An enraged Das approaches Mallesham to get crude bombs for himself. Pandu mediates with Ravi and Raju to end the fight and have their own respective shops run peacefully, to which they accept. However, Rinku provokes Das and his friends to fight, which results in the death of Rinku's friend, Anish, when Das hurls a bomb meant for Rinku. The whole fiasco ends up with a serious police case, where Rinku is the prime witness. Das breaks up with Sakhi to avoid dragging her into the situation. Zoya, who is Das' friend's sister, starts feeling sympathetic towards Das.

Later, Ravi and Raju accept to make a deal upon which, Das has to pay 20 lakhs INR to withdraw the police case. The rest of the story is about how Das gets out of the situation alive, along with his friends, whilst also surviving assassination attempts from Rinku.

== Cast ==
- Vishwak Sen as 'Falaknuma' Das
- Master Aman as Young Das
- Saloni Mishra as Zoya
- Harshita Gaur as Sakhi
- Prasanthi Charuolingah as Tina
- Uttej as Peg Pandu
- Jeevan Kumar as Shankar Anna
- Tharun Bhascker as Inspector Saidulu
- Vivek Chepuri as Ravi
- Sunjit Akkinepally as Raju
- Bala Parasar as Das's mother
- Anmona Chaliha as Das's sister
- Praneeth Reddy Kallem as Rinku Sharma, Ravi's brother-in-law
- John Kottoly as Mallesh
- Sharath Sreerangam as Mahesh
- Venkatesh Kakumanu as Circuit
- Sonu Shahnawaz as Filament
- Laxman Meesala as Laxman
- Abhinav Gomatam as Psychiatrist (cameo)

== Music ==
The soundtrack for the film was composed by Vivek Sagar. Suddala Ashok Teja, Bhaskarbhatla Ravikumar and Kittu Vissapragada wrote the lyrics for the songs.

Falaknuma Das

Soundtrack album by Vivek Sagar
- Released: 2019
- Recorded: 2019
- Genre: Feature film soundtrack
- Length: 21:02
- Label: Sony Music India
- Producer: Vivek Sagar

Vivek Sagar chronology
Ee Nagaraniki Emaindi (2018)	Falaknuma Das (2019)	Brochevarevarura (2019)

Tracklist
No.	Title	Singer(s)	Length
1.	"Paye Paye"	Shiva Nagulu, Rahul Sipligunj	4:38
2.	"Dasu Bindasu"	Kailash Kher	4:41
3.	"Arerey Manasa"	Sid Sriram	5:02
4.	"Falaknuma Mama"	Jassie Gift	4:12
5.	"Tum Miley Ho"	Kailash Kher	2:33

== Release ==
The film was released on 31 May 2019.

== Critical reception ==
Falaknuma Das received mixed reviews from critics. Hemanth Kumar of Firstpost wrote "Falaknuma Das is like eating mutton biryani. The aroma and taste knocks you out for sometime, and once you get used to the flavour, it loses the very charm that made you crave for it". Neeshita Nyayapati Of The Times Of India wrote "The biggest drawback of Falaknuma Das is the lack of structure in its narrative, for it does show potential by shining through in the most unsuspecting moments with its subtle humour".

Krishna Sripada of The News Minute wrote "Falaknuma Das is a realistic crime drama that revolves around a testosterone-driven, eternally animalistic, mindless bunch of toxic men forever courting trouble". Y Sunita Chowdhary of The Hindu wrote "A gritty story, native narrative and great performances make 'Falaknuma Das' an interesting watch".

The movie received a rating of 6.3/10 stars from users on IMDb.

== Accolades ==
Award	Date of ceremony	Category	Recipient(s) and nominee(s)	Result	Ref.
South Indian International Movie Awards	18 September 2021	Best Debut Director – Telugu	Vishwak Sen	Nominated	
South Indian International Movie Awards	18 September 2021	Best Debut Producer – Telugu	Vanmaye Creations	Nominated	
South Indian International Movie Awards	18 September 2021	Best Male Playback Singer – Telugu	Sid Sriram (for "Aarerey Manasa")	Nominated	
