= Ee Nagaraniki Emaindhi =

2018 Indian film by Tharun Bhascker

Ee Nagaraniki Emaindi
- Theatrical release poster
- Directed by: Tharun Bhascker
- Written by: Tharun Bhascker
- Produced by: D. Suresh Babu
- Starring: Vishwak Sen; Sushanth Reddy; Abhinav Gomatam; Venkatesh Kakamanu; Anisha Ambrose; Simran Choudhary
- Cinematography: Niketh Bommireddy
- Edited by: Ravi Teja Girijala
- Music by: Vivek Sagar
- Production company: Suresh Productions
- Distributed by: Suresh Productions
- Release date: 29 June 2018
- Running time: 140 minutes
- Country: India
- Language: Telugu
- Budget: ₹2 crore
- Box office: est. ₹12 crore

Ee Nagaraniki Emaindi (transl. What happened to this city?) is a 2018 Indian Telugu-language buddy comedy film written and directed by Tharun Bhascker, and produced by D. Suresh Babu under Suresh Productions. The film stars Vishwak Sen, Sai Sushanth Reddy, Abhinav Gomatam, Venkatesh Kakumanu, Anisha Ambrose, Simran Choudhary, and Galusheya Daria. Music was composed by Vivek Sagar with cinematography by Niketh Bommireddy and editing by Ravi Teja Girijala. Released on 29 June 2018, the film initially received positive reviews from critics and went on to become a commercial success. Over time, it has achieved cult classic status.

The film was re-released five years later on the same date in Telangana and Andhra Pradesh in select theatres.

== Plot ==
Karthik, a manager at a posh club in Hyderabad, is about to marry his boss's daughter and start a new life in the U.S. However, after a chaotic night out, Karthik loses the rare family diamond ring his boss gifted him. To replace it, he and his friends — Vivek, Kaushik and Uppi — enter a short film competition in Goa. Along the way, they rekindle old dreams of filmmaking, confront unresolved issues, and rediscover themselves.

== Cast ==
- Vishwak Sen as Vivek (based on Tharun Bhascker)
- Sai Sushanth Reddy as Karthik (based on Nagesh Banell), a night club manager who plans to settle in the USA by marrying his boss's daughter.
- Abhinav Gomatam as Kaushik, a Telugu dubbing artiste with aspirations of becoming an actor.
- Venkatesh Kakumanu as Upender "Uppi" (based on Ravi Teja Girijala), a wedding video editor with a passion for film making.
- Anisha Ambrose as Shirley, a promotional contest host who becomes Vivek's love interest.
- Simran Choudhary as Shilpa, Vivek's ex-girlfriend.
- Galusheya Daria as Dasha, Shirley's friend who lives in Goa and lead in Vivek's Goa short film.
- Arjun as Satvik, Kaushik's nephew who gets involved in the group's antics.
- Viren Thambidorai as Karthik's boss, who has his own plans for his daughter's future.
- Jeevan Kumar as Vivek's uncle who is a police officer.
- Revathi Nadha Pulipati as Kaushik's father.
- Vijay Kumar as the owner of a camera rental store in Goa.
- Geetha Bhaskar as Vivek's mother, who worries about her son's isolation.
- Mounima as Kaushik's sister, who supports her brother's dreams.
- Ranjani Sivakumar as lecturer in Vivek's college laboratory.
- Tharun Bhascker as Jury member of Goa short film festival
- Vijay Deverakonda as himself in a cameo appearance during the shooting of Pelli Choopulu
- Gautham Vasudev Menon as himself in a cameo appearance

== Soundtrack ==
Tharun continued his collaboration with Vivek Sagar, dating back to his early short film projects. The album, featuring five tracks, was released by Aditya Music.

Ee Nagaraniki Emaindhi

Soundtrack album by Vivek Sagar
- Released: 14 June 2018
- Recorded: 2018
- Genre: Soundtrack
- Length: 23:09
- Label: Aditya Music
- Producer: Vivek Sagar

Vivek Sagar chronology
| Sammohanam (2018) | Ee Nagaraniki Emaindhi (2018) | Falaknuma Das (2019) |
External audio
- Audio Jukebox on YouTube

Track listing
| No. | Title | Lyrics | Singer(s) | Length |
|---|---|---|---|---|
| 1. | "Aagi Aagi" | Krishna Kanth | Anurag Kulkarni, Manisha Eerabathini | 6:48 |
| 2. | "Collegee Agelona" | Kittu Vissapragada | Wilson Herald | 2:38 |
| 3. | "Swagatham Suswagatham" | Cisco Chi | Cisco Chi | 2:02 |
| 4. | "Parada Jarupukoni" | Kittu Vissapragada | Vedala Hemachandra, Anurag Kulkarni (backing vocals) | 4:32 |
| 5. | "Veediponidhi Okateley" | Vivek Athreya | Vivek Sagar | 3:07 |
| 6. | "Maarey Kalaley" | Vivek Athreya | Sooraj Santhosh | 4:02 |
| Total length: | | | | 23:09 |

== Box office ==
Ee Nagaraniki Emaindi was released worldwide on 28 June 2018, and earned ₹80 lakh on its opening day. In the U.S., it garnered $98,136 from premiere shows, with a lifetime box office total of $179,263. By the end of its theatrical run, the film had collected ₹12 crore globally.

To celebrate its 5th anniversary, the film was re-released in over 200 theaters on 29 June 2023. It earned ₹1.8 crore on its first day, ₹2.8 crore by the end of the second day, and reached ₹3.3 crore by the end of the first weekend.

== Critical reception ==
The film received generally positive reviews upon its theatrical release.The Hindu praised the film and stated "With Ee Nagaraniki Emaindi, Tharun Bhascker Dhaassyam breaks the second-film jinx that hounds many filmmakers who've delivered an impressive first film." The Times of India gave 3.5/5 rating and commented that: "Make no mistake, Ee Nagaraniki Emaindi belongs to Tharun Bhascker. The filmmaker's flair for comedy once again shines through and his dialogues are terrific."

123 Telugu gave 3.25/5 rating and wrote, "With Ee Nagarainiki Emaindi, Tollywood steps into the buddy comedy genre which has been rarely explored. This movie has no great story but is filled with a lot of fun and precious moments which a group of buddies share in real life." The Hans India gave a 3/5 rating and opined that the film was one of the best youthful entertainers in the recent times. "On the whole, the film is enjoyable entirely and even makes us emotional in parts," reviewer added. Idlebrain.com gave 3/5 rating and wrote, "[It] is a buddy comedy that has good moments and a slow second half!"

== Sequel ==
The sequel to this film, ENE Repeat, is set to be released on 19 November 2026. Directed once again by Tharun Bhascker, with Srujan Yarabolu and Sandeep Nagireddy serving as producers, the project is a co-production between S Originals and Rootnode Cinema. Vishwak Sen, Abhinav Gomatam, and Venkatesh Kakumanu return to star.
