= Kranthi =

Kranthi can be a masculine given name. Notable people with the name include:

- Kranthi Kumar, Indian film director
- Kranthi Kumar (cricketer) (born 1996), Indian cricketer
- Kranthi Madhav, Indian writer
- Kranthi Kumar Panikera, Indian adventurer and television presenter
- Chanti Kranthi Kiran, Indian journalist and politician
