= Sita (2019 film) =

2019 film directed by Teja

- Theatrical release poster
- Directed by: Teja
- Written by: Lakshmi Bhupal (dialogues)
- Screenplay by: Paruchuri Brothers; Teja
- Story by: Teja
- Produced by: Sunkara Ramabrahmam
- Starring: Bellamkonda Sreenivas; Kajal Aggarwal; Sonu Sood
- Cinematography: Sirsha Ray
- Edited by: Kotagiri Venkateswara Rao
- Music by: Anup Rubens
- Production company: Ariel Studios
- Release date: 24 May 2019
- Running time: 162 minutes
- Country: India
- Language: Telugu

Sita is a 2019 Indian Telugu-language romantic action film directed by Teja and produced by Sunkara Ramabrahmam. The film stars Bellamkonda Sreenivas, Kajal Aggarwal as the titular character, and Sonu Sood. The music was composed by Anoop Rubens with cinematography by Sirsha Ray and editing by Kotagiri Venkateswara Rao. This film was inspired by the 1988 Hollywood film Rain Man. Sita was released on 24 May 2019 to negative reviews with praise for Kajal’s performance. The film eventually became a box office failure.

== Plot ==
Raghuram, a four-year-old boy, is left in a monastery by Anand Mohan. He is promised that Sita will come to take care of him. Anand makes Ram promise that he too will take care of Sita in return.

Years later, V. Sita Mahalakshmi is an ambitious and successful, yet arrogant and selfish businesswoman who manipulates people for her own gain. One day, she meets Basavaraju, a crooked MLA, to help her in evacuating a slum from the land she purchased to build a mall. In return, Basava asks Sita to marry him (though he is already married), which she declines. He then asks her to be in a live-in relationship for a month, to which she agrees and signs a contract. The slum is removed from the land, and Sita departs with her staff. Basava arrives, but she refuses to honor the deal. Irritated by her behavior, Basava pressures Sita by bribing or intimidating the officers into stopping the mall she is working on and threatening the man who gave her Rs. 25 crore for her business development to make her repay the loan immediately.

During this time, Sita learns that her estranged father Anand has died, so she plans to inherit ₹5000 crores worth of property owned by him to pay off the loan. The lawyer reveals that Anand left only a mangalsutra in her name, and she is shocked upon learning that the property was transferred to his long-lost cousin brother Ram, who stays in Bhutan. With her friend Chakram and PA Rupa, Sita travels to Bhutan and meets Ram, who is eagerly waiting for her. Ram is an intellectually disabled man, but is very intelligent and always remembers the promise that he made to his uncle that he must take care of Sita, and she will take care of him. He always wears two watches, one of which shows his heartbeat, wanting everything to be as per the timing. Sita threatens Ram to give her property back, and in a helpless situation, she asks him to come with her without informing the monastery.

A series of funny incidents take place where Ram tries to be honest, which irritates Sita. The police, arranged by Basava, try to arrest Sita for forgery, but she keeps escaping from them with Ram, Chakram, and Rupa. Sita asks Ram to sign the property papers so that Ram will legally accept the property, and then she can ask him to put it back in her name. Sita asks Ram to marry her but has Rupa give her a fake call, which she uses to create a scene that the police are looking for her. Ram signs the papers immediately to save Sita, and she rushes to the bank to withdraw the money, planning to leave Ram behind. However, the bank cannot authorize the transfer without Sita providing legal proof that Ram is her husband. The police find and try to arrest Sita, but Ram saves her again. However, she remains indifferent to him throughout the ordeal, upsetting Chakram and Rupa.

Later, Sita reaches the court with help from Ram, Chakram, Rupa, and some local people to acquire bail. Afterwards, her father's friend and the family's legal advisor reveals Ram's connection to her: Sita's egoistic mother refused to give her jewelry for mortgage to Anand to help start his business. Anand's sister (Ram's mother) then offered her jewelry, including her mangalsutra, to her brother. When Ram's parents die in an accident, Anand brings Ram into his home, and during this time, his business takes off. Sita's mother celebrates with lavish jewelry for herself and her daughter. Anand yells that since the business formed because of his sister's financial support, the property rights belong to Ram. Anand reveals that Sita can wear the jewelry as she is Ram's wife. This outrages Sita's mother, and she starts abusing Ram, prompting Anand to leave him in the monastery to protect him. Hearing this, Sita decides to repay the jewels given by Ram's mother as a loan.

Meanwhile, Basava's men attack Ram. Sita tries to save him but gets beaten by a goon. Ram fights all the goons, but Basava shoots him and demands that Sita surrender to him to save Ram. Sita eventually agrees to Basava's terms, but when seeing her crying, Ram wakes up and fights with Basava, who shoots him again. Sita and Ram manage to escape, and while she is taking Ram to the hospital, he requests that Sita take him to the bank so he can sign the property papers before he dies. However, Sita finally declares that she needs him and not the property. Basava attacks the car, and they are both injured. The monk in the monastery sends one of his disciples to safeguard Ram, and he arrives on time with the ambulance.

Two weeks later, Sita regains consciousness and rushes to see Ram. The monk tells her that Ram has died in the accident and scolds Sita over how she treated him. Sita tearfully leaves the monastery, remorseful that she is the one who killed Ram. Ram comes to his room in the monastery, senses that Sita has arrived, and rushes to see her (as the monk was lying). Sita also senses that the monk lied to her, as no one in the monastery knows what happened in Hyderabad. Later, she reconciles with Ram, and he marries her, while Basava is shot by his wife. The movie ends with Sita and Ram distributing the house papers back to the people of the slum.

== Cast ==
- Kajal Aggarwal as Vasanthavada Sita Mahalakshmi
- Bellamkonda Sreenivas as Madhuravada Raghuram
- Sonu Sood as MLA Basavaraju
- Abhinav Gomatam as Chakram, Sita's friend
- Mannara Chopra as Rupa, Sita's PA
- Brahmanandam as Krishna Satyannarayana
- Abhimanyu Singh as CI Mukesh Murari
- Kota Srinivasa Rao as Basava's father-in-law
- Tanikella Bharani as Jayababu
- K. Bhagyaraj as Vasanthavada Anand Mohan, Sita's father
- Sangeeta as Chinta Santhama
- Giri Babu as Judge
- Chandra Mohan as Police
- Amit Behl as Baba
- Lalit Parimoo as Lawyer
- Rohit Pathak as Lawyer Chakrapani
- Raja Ravindra as Psychiatrist
- Duvvasi Mohan as Constable
- Bithiri Sathi as Sathi
- Mahesh Achanta as Slum dweller
- Praveen as Bus Conductor in Bhutan
- Rethika Srinivas as Swarajyam (Sita's mother)
- Meena Kumari as Raghuram's mother
- Tirupathi Prakash as Chandulal Seth
- Kalpa Latha
- Abhishek Agarwal as Bank Officer
- Payal Rajput in a special appearance in the song "Bull Reddy"
- Satya Muchumari in a special appearance in the song "Bull Reddy"

== Soundtrack ==
Sita

Soundtrack album by Anup Rubens
- Released: 19 May 2019
- Recorded: 2019
- Studio: Harmony Studio
- Genre: Feature film soundtrack
- Length: 17:30
- Label: T-Series
- Producer: Anup Rubens

Anup Rubens chronology
Seetharama Kalyana (2018)	Sita (2019)	Hero Heroine (2019)
External audio
- Audio Jukebox on YouTube

The soundtrack was composed by Anup Rubens and lyrics by Lakshmi Bhupala, Ramajogayya Sastry, and Surendra Krishna.

Track list
No.	Title	Lyrics	Singer(s)	Length
1.	"BulReddy"	Surendra Krishna	Uma Neha, Teja, Santhosh	3:56
2.	"Rola Rola"	Ramajogayya Sastry	Paroma Dasgupta	4:01
3.	"Koyilamma"	Lakshmi Bhupal	Armaan Malik	4:19
4.	"Nijamena"	Lakshmi Bhupal	Anurag Kulkarni	3:04
5.	"Evaradi Evaradi"	Lakshmi Bhupal	Haricharan	2:10
Total length:				17:30

== Critical reception ==
Neeshita Nyayapati of The Times of India gave two-and-a-half out of five stars starts stating, "A tale of two misfits gone wrong!" A critic from India Today rated the film one-and-a-half out of five stars and wrote that "Director Teja's comeback of sorts, Sita is a yawn-inducing mind-numbing film that tries to be a modern take on the Ramayana. Bellamkonda Sai Sreenivas is caricaturish while Kajal overacts in this film". A critic from The Indian Express gave the film the same rating and wrote that "The film works on a scene-by-scene basis as in its entirety it is mediocre at best. Teja’s writing has no regard for time, place, distance and of course, logic".

A critic from 123telugu rated the film two-and-three-quarters out of five and wrote that "On the whole, Sita is undoubtedly Kajal’s career-best performance and she leads from the front. Bellamkonda Sreenivas ably supports her with his sincere act but the boring and dragged second half makes the ride bumpy".
