= Abhinav Gomatam =

Indian film actor

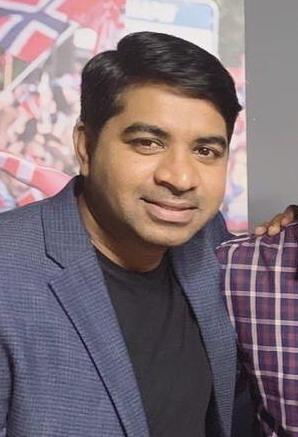
- Gomatam in 2020
- Born: Abhinav Gomatam; Hyderabad, Andhra Pradesh (present-day Telangana), India
- Education: Vignan's Foundation for Science, Technology & Research
- Occupation: Actor
- Years active: 2012–present

Abhinav Gomatam is an Indian actor who appears in Telugu films.

== Early life ==
Abhinav Gomatam was born and brought up in Hyderabad. He is an engineering graduate from Vignan Institute of Technology and Science.

== Career ==
He started his career with theater. He worked at Lamakaan, UDAAN Performing Arts (Promoted by UDAAN Academy Of Arts And Education) and Aham Theatre. He worked in several short films and moved to Telugu cinema. His more recent film credits are Malli Raava (2017), Ee Nagaraniki Emaindhi (2018), Sita (2019), Falaknuma Das (2019) and Meeku Maathrame Cheptha (2019). He received praise for his starring role in Ee Nagaraniki Emaindhi. A Cinema Express review also lauded Gomatam's performance in Meeku Maathrame Cheptha, while dismissing the film overall.

== Filmography ==
- All films are in Telugu, unless otherwise noted.

=== Films ===
Year	Title	Role	Notes	Ref.
2012	Artificial	Manav	Short film	
2013	The Delivery	Malik	Short film	
2014	Maine Pyaar Kiya	Naveen's friend		
2014	Billa Ranga			
2015	Jagannatakam	Bunty		
2017	Malli Raava	Dumbo		
2018	Ee Nagaraniki Emaindhi	Kaushik		
2019	Jessie			
2019	Falaknuma Das	Psychiatrist	Cameo appearance	
2019	Sita	Chakram		
2019	Meeku Maathrame Cheptha	Kamesh		
2021	Rang De	Yanam		
2021	Ichata Vahanamulu Niluparadu	Meenu's brother-in-law		
2021	Shyam Singha Roy	Pramod		
2022	Sehari	Vasu		
2023	Virupaksha	Surya's friend		
2023	Spy	RAW agent Kamal		
2023	Gandeevadhari Arjuna	Dinesh		
2023	Miss Shetty Mr Polishetty	Rahul		
2024	Kismat	Abhi		
2024	Masthu Shades Unnai Raa	Manohar "Manu"		
2024	Operation Valentine	Dhruv		
2024	My Dear Donga	Suresh		
2025	Sundarakanda	Siddharth's friend		
2025	Santhana Prapthirasthu	Subbu		
2026	Mana Shankara Vara Prasad Garu	Musthafa		
2026	Repu Udayam 10 Gantalaku	Raghu		
2026	ENE Repeat	Kaushik		

=== Television ===
Year	Title	Role	Network	Notes
2023–2024	Save the Tigers	Rahul	Disney+ Hotstar	
2024	Thulasivanam		ETV Win	Cameo appearance
