= Tharun Bhascker =

Indian film director, writer, actor and television presenter

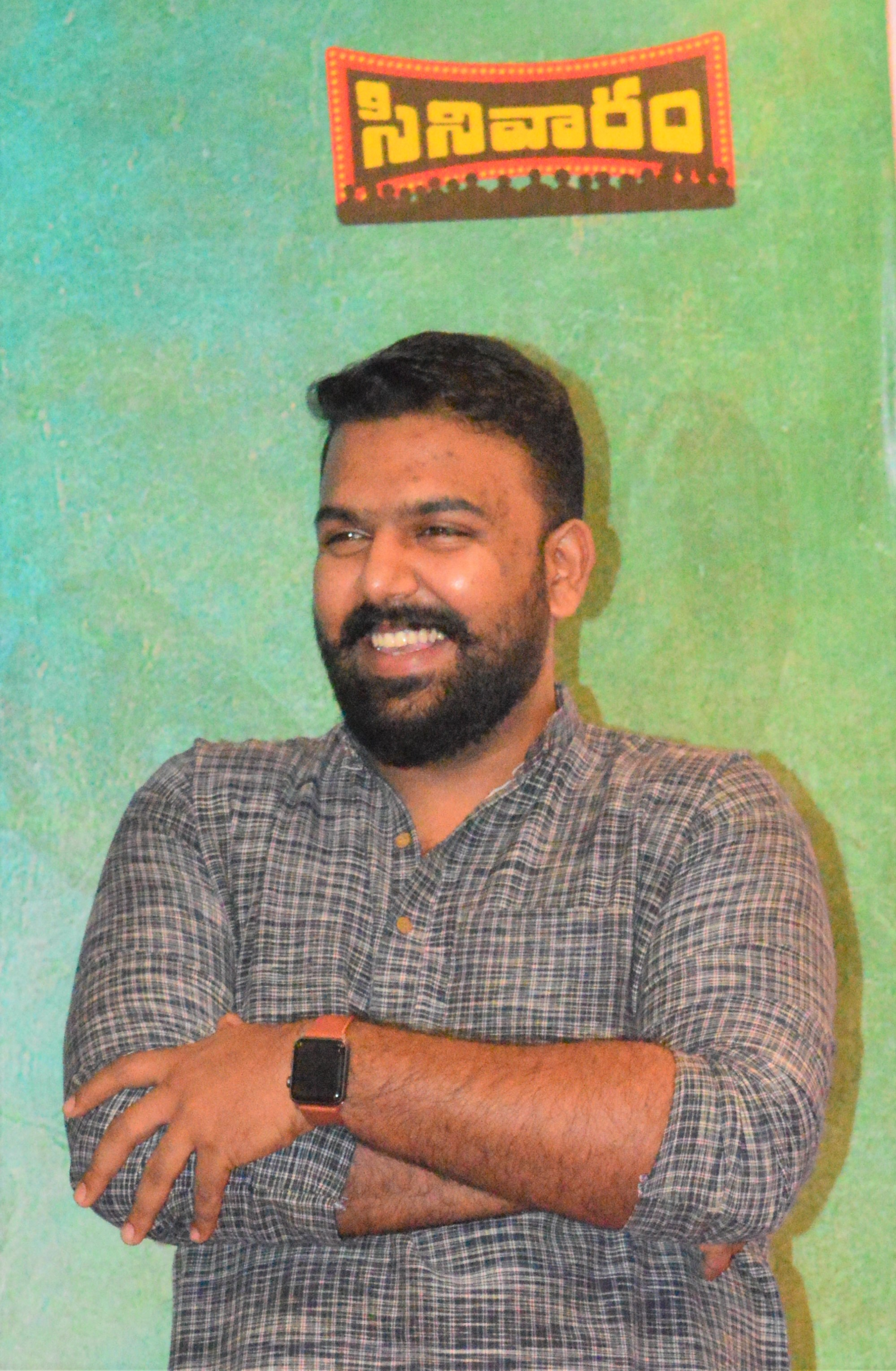
- Bhascker at Cinivaram 2017
- Born: Tharun Bhascker Dhaassyam; 5 November 1988 (age 38); Madras (present-day Chennai), Tamil Nadu, India
- Education: Swami Vivekananda Institute of Technology; New York Film Academy
- Occupations: Film director; writer; actor; television presenter
- Years active: 2012–present
- Spouse: Latha Naidu (m. 2013, separated)
- Website: tharunbhascker.com

Tharun Bhascker Dhaassyam (born 5 November 1988) is an Indian film director, actor and screenwriter who works in Telugu cinema. He directed the romantic comedy Pelli Choopulu (2016), which won him the National Film Award for Best Feature Film in Telugu and Best Screenplay – Dialogues. He later directed Ee Nagaraniki Emaindhi (2018), and made his acting debut in a lead role with Meeku Maathrame Cheptha (2019).

== Early life ==
Tharun Bhascker was born on 5 November 1988 in Chennai and was raised in Hyderabad. His father hailed from Warangal, Telangana, while his mother is from Tirupati, Andhra Pradesh. Bhascker studied at The Hyderabad Public School, Begumpet, and Swami Vivekananda Institute of Technology. He later graduated from New York Film Academy.

His father, Uday Bhaskar, died in 2015. His mother, Geetha Bhaskar, made her acting debut in Sekhar Kammula's Fidaa (2017).

== Film career ==
Bhascker started his career directing short films such as Anukokunda, and Sainma. Anukokunda was screened at the Cannes Film Festival.

His first full length directorial feature film was Pelli Choopulu (2016). The film received National Film Award for Best Feature Film in Telugu, and Bhasckar won Best Screenplay for Dialogues. The film was remade in Hindi as Mitron (2018), in Malayalam as Vijay Superum Pournamiyum (2019), and in Tamil as Oh Manapenne!.

In 2018, Bhasckar made his acting debut with the role of Singeetham Srinivasa Rao in the biopic Mahanati. His second directorial is the buddy comedy film Ee Nagaraniki Emaindhi (2018). Later in the year, he wrote the screenplay for the ZEE5 web series, B. Tech.

In 2019, Bhaskar played the lead role in Meeku Maathrame Cheptha.

Keedaa Cola, directed by Tharun Bhascker, was released on 3 November 2023. His next film as a lead actor was Gaayapadda Simham released theatrically on 1st May, 2026.

== Personal life ==
Bhascker is the son of actress and educational entrepreneur Geetha Bhascker Dhaassyam who has appeared in films such as Fidaa (2017), Ee Nagaraniki Emaindi (2018), and Sita Ramam (2022) amongst others. He is also the nephew of the former Warangal West MLA Dasyam Vinay Bhaskar.

== Filmography ==
=== As a director ===
Year	Title	Notes
2016	Pelli Choopulu	National Film Award for Best Screenplay – Dialogues
2018	Ee Nagaraniki Emaindhi	
2021	Pitta Kathalu	Netflix anthology film; Ramula segment
2023	Keedaa Cola	
2026	ENE Repeat	

=== As an actor ===
Acting roles
Year	Title	Role	Notes
2018	Mahanati	Singeetam Srinivasa Rao	
2018	Sammohanam	Himself	Cameo appearance
2019	Falaknuma Das	Saidulu	
2019	Meeku Maathrame Cheptha	Rakesh	debut as lead actor
2020	Middle Class Melodies	AE	Cameo appearances
2021	Skylab	Scientist	Cameo appearances
2022	Sita Ramam	Balaji	
2023	Das Ka Dhamki	Blue Jaguar guy	
2023	Hostel Boys	Editor	Telugu version
2023	Keedaa Cola	Bhakta Naidu	
2023	Mangalavaaram		Cameo appearance in a song
2024	Masthu Shades Unnai Raa	Veer Das	
2025	Santhana Prapthirasthu	Jack Reddy	
2026	Om Shanti Shanti Shantihi	Omkar Naidu	
2026	Gaayapadda Simham	Dharahas	

=== As dialogue writer ===
Year	Title	Notes
2018	Maa	Short film; Telugu dubbed version
2019	Meeku Maathrame Cheptha	
2026	#Cult	

=== As short film director ===
Year	Title
2008	Wake up
2008	HELP
2008	My India
2009	We Can-Blind Cricket
2009	The Artist's Poem
2010	HPS.wmv
2011	Highderabad
2011	This day-Catharsis
2011	24 frames-Telugu version
2011	The Method
2011	Minutes to midnight
2011	Serendipity
2011	Kaala Ghoda
2011	The Journey
2012	Junun
2012	Anukokunda
2015	Sainma

=== As voice actor ===
Year	Title	Role	Notes
2023	Chinna	Venkatesh	Dubbed in Telugu for Baalaji S. U. in Chithha
2024	Gorre Puranam	Gorre/Sheep	Voice role only

=== Television ===
Year	Title	Role	Network	Notes
2018	B. Tech		ZEE5	Writer
2020	Neeku Maathrame Cheptha	Host	ETV Plus	
2023	Anger Tales	Rajeev	Disney+ Hotstar	Episode: Food Festival
2023	Dhootha	Bhupati Varma Avudhuri	Amazon Prime Video	

== Discography ==
Year	Film	Song	Music	Co-artists	Notes
2021	Cinema Bandi	"Cinema Teesinam"	Varun Reddy	Roll Rida	also lyrics

== Awards and nominations ==
Film	Award	Ceremony	Category	Result	Ref.
Pelli Choopulu	National Film Awards	2017	National Film Award for Best Feature Film in Telugu	Won	
Pelli Choopulu	National Film Awards	2017	Best Screenplay for Dialogues	Won	
Pelli Choopulu	Filmfare Awards South	2017	Best Director	Nominated	
Pelli Choopulu	South Indian International Movie Awards	2017	Best Debut Director (Telugu)	Won	
Pelli Choopulu	Santosham Film Awards	2017	Best Debut Director	Won	
