= Saripodhaa Sanivaaram =

2024 Indian film by Vivek Athreya

- Theatrical release poster
- Directed by: Vivek Athreya
- Written by: Vivek Athreya
- Produced by: D. V. V. Danayya
- Starring: Nani; S. J. Suryah; Priyanka Mohan
- Cinematography: Murali G.
- Edited by: Karthika Srinivas
- Music by: Jakes Bejoy
- Production company: DVV Entertainment
- Distributed by: Sri Venkateswara Creations
- Release date: 29 August 2024
- Running time: 175 minutes
- Country: India
- Language: Telugu
- Budget: ₹40 crore
- Box office: est. ₹101.51 crore

Saripodhaa Sanivaaram (transl. Is Saturday not enough?) is a 2024 Indian Telugu-language action thriller film written and directed by Vivek Athreya and produced by D. V. V. Danayya under DVV Entertainment. It stars Nani, S. J. Suryah and Priyanka Mohan, alongside Abhirami Gopikumar, Aditi Balan, P. Sai Kumar, Subhalekha Sudhakar, Murali Sharma and Ajay Ghosh. The film follows Surya, who fights injustices on Saturday and ends up clashing with Daya, a corrupt and sadistic cop. The film was inspired by the basic concept of the novel Sanivaaram Naadi, written by Malladi Venkata Krishna Murthy, where the protagonist of the novel commits extrajudicial violence only on Saturdays.

The film was officially announced in October 2023 under the tentative title Nani 31, as it is the actor's 31st film as a lead actor, and the official title was announced a few days later. Principal photography commenced the following month. It was shot in several legs, predominantly in Hyderabad. The music was composed by Jakes Bejoy, while cinematography and editing were handled by Murali G. and Karthika Srinivas. Saripodhaa Sanivaaram released worldwide on 29 August 2024 to generally positive reviews from critics, who praised its performances (especially Nani and Suryah), music, action sequences, and screenplay, but criticised the runtime.

== Plot ==
Insurance agent Surya struggles with anger management. During his childhood, his mother Chayadevi bound him to a promise that he could only process and act on his rage on Saturdays. Before her death, Chayadevi also helped her sister-in-law, Prabhavati, and her niece, Kallu, escape abuse from the former's alcoholic husband, Seethapathi, by assuming new identities and leaving town. Surya uses a Saturday to beat Seethapathi, and records grievances in a journal to evaluate every Saturday as to whether to retaliate before midnight. His vigilantism strains relations with his family, particularly his sister Bhadra who cuts ties with him, prompting their father Sankaram to secretly warn Surya's targets to prevent further violence.

Years later, Surya connects with police constable Charulatha at Sokulapalem police station, unaware that she is his long-lost cousin Kallu. Sokulapalem's law-abiding residents face stigma and systemic oppression because their ancestors had criminal backgrounds, and are subjected to police brutality from Inspector Dayanand "Daya", who vents frustration over legal disputes with his politician brother, Koormanand. Charu discretely protects the locals and befriends Surya after witnessing him save an elderly woman from Daya. Charu becomes aware of a vigilante targeting people who have wronged her, including Daya's confidant SI Sudhakar, strictly on Saturdays. As romantic feelings develop between Charu and Surya, the latter reveals his identity as the vigilante after surviving an attack by rivals, and promises to protect Sokulapalem.

When Charu uncovers a plot by Daya to assassinate Koormanand at a temple on a Thursday, Surya orchestrates a delay until on Saturday. Sankaram sedates Surya with sleeping pills to keep him safe, leaving Charu to disrupt the temple attack alone. Surya's past enemies attack his home, threatening a heavily-pregnant Bhadra, who had just came back and return to her family. Surya awakens, saves his family, and attacks Daya before he could shoot Koormanand in a pub, but Bhadra demands that he abandon his Saturday rule as a condition for her forgiveness. Surya agrees, while a recovering Daya intensifies his hunt for the Saturday vigilante, unleashing police brutality on Sokulapalem, believing the vigilante is one of them.

On a Saturday, Daya realizes Charu is complicit in foiling his assassination attempt on Koormanand and connects her to Surya. Koormanand discovers Daya's intent to kill him, but Daya shoots him dead first, framing the vigilante and inciting Koormanand's henchmen to attack Sokulapalem. Surya discovers Charu's true identity and arrives to find Charu injured and the residents cornered. Sankaram intervenes and reveals that Bhadra permitted Surya to break his promise and act. Surya refuses to fight the battle alone and urges the residents of Sokulapalem to stand up for themselves. The community revolts against Koormanand's henchmen in a battle, while Surya overpowers Daya during in the midst of it all.

In the aftermath, CCTV footage of Koormanand's murder is leaked, prompting Koormanand's loyalist and right-hand man, Govardhan to murder Daya and Sudhakar. Bhadra gives birth to a daughter, whom Surya considers the reincarnation of his mother, while Surya and Charu become a couple.

== Cast ==
- Nani as Surya "Chinnu", an NLIC agent
  - Ruthvik Varma as young Surya
- S. J. Suryah as CI R. Dayanand "Daya"
- Priyanka Mohan as PC Charulatha "Charu"/Kalyani "Kallu"
- Abhirami Gopikumar as Chayadevi, Surya and Bhadra's mother
- Aditi Balan as Bhadra, Surya's elder sister
- P. Sai Kumar as Sankaram, Surya and Bhadra's father
- Murali Sharma as Koormanand, Daya's brother
- Ajay as Govardhan, Koormanand's right-hand man
- Jhansi as Vasudha, a therapist
- Supreeth as Kaali, Narayana Prabha's son
- Ajay Ghosh as Narayana Prabha
- Subhalekha Sudhakar as HC Kamalakar N.
- Harsha Vardhan as SI Sudhakar
- Ali as Surya's boss
- Mime Madhu as a villager
- Sivaji Raja as a villager
- Satya Prakash as Seethapathi, Chayadevi's brother and Kallu's father
- Anitha Chowdary as Prabhavati, Kallu's mother
- Vishnu Oi as Surya's friend
- Jeevan Kumar as Koormanand's assistant
- Vamsi Chaganti as Santhosh, Bhadra's husband and Surya's brother-in-law
- Vadlamani Srinivas as Santhosh's father
- Harsh Roshan as Faazil
- Sharath Barigela as sutta
- Aruna Bhikshu as a car driver
- Vinay Mahadev as Narayana Prabha's henchmen
- Prudhvi Raj Palaparthi
- Kaikala Satyanarayana as Koormanand and Dayanand's late father (photo presence)

== Production ==
=== Development ===
In late May 2023, Vivek Athreya and Nani were reported to be collaborating after Ante Sundaraniki, which marks Nani's 31st film in a leading role. On 21 October, the project was officially announced by DVV Entertainment, tentatively titled Nani31. The title, Saripodhaa Sanivaaram was revealed on 23 October 2023. A muhurtam pooja ceremony was held on 24 October 2023 in Hyderabad with the film's cast and crew.

=== Casting ===
In October 2023, Priyanka Mohan and S. J. Suryah joined the cast, with the former collaborating with both Nani and Suryah for the second time after Nani's Gang Leader (2019) and Don (2022), respectively. G. V. Prakash Kumar and Anirudh Ravichander were considered for the film's music composer, but Jakes Bejoy, Murali G and Karthika Srinivas were announced as music composer, cinematographer and editor respectively.

=== Filming ===
Principal photography commenced in November 2023 in Hyderabad. The first schedule was wrapped up later that same month. The second schedule commenced in late December 2023.

== Music ==
The music and background score were composed by Jakes Bejoy in his maiden collaboration with Nani and Athreya. The 12-song soundtrack had lyrics written by Sanapati Bharadwaj Patrudu, Sanare, Krishna Kanth and Karthik Sachin, and was preceded by three singles—"Garam Garam", "Ullasam" and "Sa Ri Ma Pa"— before the full album released by Sony Music India on 25 August 2024.

== Release ==
=== Theatrical ===
Saripodhaa Sanivaaram was released on 29 August 2024 in Telugu along with its dubbed versions(titled Surya's Saturday) in Hindi,Tamil, Malayalam and Kannada. The film is scheduled to release in Japan on 14 February 2025.

=== Home media ===
The film's post-theatrical digital streaming rights were acquired by Netflix for a cost of ₹45 crore, while Zee Telugu has acquired the satellite rights. The film began streaming on Netflix from 26 September 2024.

== Reception ==
=== Critical reception ===
Saripodhaa Sanivaaram received generally positive reviews from critics, who praised its performances (especially Nani and Suryah), music, action sequences, and screenplay, but criticised the runtime.

Goutham. S of Pinkvilla gave 3.5/5 stars and wrote, "Saripodhaa Sanivaaram is a thoroughly action-packed film. The movie takes on the challenge of redefining the standards of violent cinema by incorporating elements that are more appealing to the masses." Avinash Ramachandran of The Indian Express gave 3/5 stars and wrote, "Nani and Vivek Athreya's second collaboration has all the highs of the quintessential mass masala entertainer, but it also comes with its fair share of lows." Balakrishna Ganeshan of The News Minute gave 3/5 stars and wrote, "Saripodhaa Sanivaaram is largely a well-written film. Every scene and character is relevant to the story. Each time you try to predict the plot, Athreya cleverly surprises you by widening the canvas." Janani. K of India Today gave 3/5 stars and wrote, "With 'Saripodhaa Sanivaaram', Nani and director Vivek Athreya have a winner in their hands."

The Hans India gave 3/5 stars and wrote, "Saripodhaa Sanivaaram is a well-executed action drama that succeeds in delivering powerful performances and a gripping narrative. While the film's pacing could have been improved, the strong performances by Nani and SJ Suryah, along with the compelling story, make it a worthwhile watch." Sashidhar Adivi of Times Now gave 2.5/5 stars and wrote, "Saripodhaa Sanivaaram is a watchable vigilante action drama that has been made as a semi-comedy." BVS Prakash of Deccan Chronicle gave 2/5 stars and wrote, "it [the film] turns out to be disappointing fare due to wafer-thin plot and dreary narration and eventually, the much-hyped action film goes for a toss, although it has its share of good moments." Manoj Kumar R of Desimartini gave 2/5 stars and wrote, "Vivek Athreya attempts to create a quintessential Telugu action drama but seems to falter in a genre that doesn't play to his strengths."

Sangeetha Devi Dundoo of The Hindu wrote, "Director Vivek Athreya's fine writing makes ‘Saripodhaa Sanivaaram’ a nuanced action drama, accentuated by performances of Nani and SJ Suryah." Pratyusha Sista of Telangana Today wrote, "Saripodhaa Sanivaaram is a complete entertainer. With its engaging story, strong performances, and well-executed direction, it is a film that keeps the audience hooked from start to finish."

=== Box office ===
Saripodhaa Sanivaaram earned over ₹6 crore in India and ₹19.75 crore worldwide on its opening day. It concluded its run with worldwide gross estimated to be ₹94.80–100 crore.
