= Govinda Govinda (2021 film) =

2021 Indian Kannada comedy thriller film

- Directed by: Thilak
- Written by: Vivek Athreya
- Based on: Brochevarevarura
- Produced by: S. Shailendra Babu; M. K. Kishore; Ravi R. Garani
- Starring: Sumanth Shailendra; Bhavana; Roopesh Shetty; Kavitha Gowda
- Cinematography: K. S. Chandrasekhar
- Edited by: C. Ravichandra
- Music by: Pradeep Varma
- Production companies: Shree Shailendra Productions; LG Creations; Ravi Garani Productions
- Distributed by: Pushkar Films
- Release date: 26 November 2021
- Running time: 140 minutes
- Country: India
- Language: Kannada

Govinda Govinda is a 2021 Indian Kannada comedy thriller film directed by Thilak, making his debut. The film was jointly produced by S. Shailendra Babu, M. K. Kishore and Ravi R. Garani. It features Sumanth Shailendra in the lead role. The supporting cast includes Vijay Chendur, Pavan and Achyuth Kumar. The score and soundtrack for the film is by Hithan Hasan and the cinematography is by K. S. Chandrasekhar. The film is an official remake of 2019 Telugu film Brochevarevarura.

== Cast ==
- Sumanth Shailendra as Venkatesha
- Bhavana as Padmavathi
- Roopesh Shetty as Srinivas
- Kavitha Gowda as Alamelu
- Vijay Chendoor as Hari Dodkunde
- Pavan as Keshav Karade
- Achyuth Kumar as Principal Sheshachala, Alamelu's father
- Shobaraj as Inspector Narayana
- V. Manohar as Ramana, Venkatesha's father
- Padma Vasanthi as Ratnamma
- Ajay Ghosh as Tirupati
- Kaddipudi Chandru as Narahari
- K. Manju as Producer

== Production ==
The film was announced in December 2019 after the shoot had started. The film marks comeback of actor Sumanth Shailendra to Kannada films. The team had Bhavana reprising the role of Nivetha Pethuraj and Kavitha Gowda reprising the role of Nivetha Thomas from the original. The film later had Tulu actor Roopesh Shetty play another male lead role. The filming of the film had taken place in Vijayapura and in and around Bengaluru.

== Soundtrack ==
Govinda Govinda

Soundtrack album by Hithan Hassan
- Genre: Feature film soundtrack
- Language: Kannada
- Label: Pushkar Films
- Producer: S Shailendra Babu

The film's background score and the soundtracks are composed by Hithan Hassan. The music rights were acquired by Pushkar Films.

Tracklist
No.	Title	Lyrics	Singer(s)	Length
1.	"Modern Suprabhatha"	Dev Rangabhoomi	Kadab gere Muniraju, Hithan Hassan	2:07
2.	"Yaarivaro"	Hithan Hassan	Vyasraj	3:45
3.	"Kanninda Jaari"	Vijay Vishwavani	Anuradha Bhat	4:00
4.	"Govinda Govinda"	Hithan Hassan	Anthony Das	4:07
5.	"Aavarisu"	Sai Sukanya	Vyasraj	1:32
6.	"Manmohe"	Hithan Hassan	Hithan Hassan	2:45
Total length:				24:58

== Release and reception ==
The film was earlier slated to release on 16 April 2021 but owing to COVID-19 pandemic the film was theatrically released on 26 November 2021.

The Times Of India gave 3/5 stars stating "Govinda Govinda is a fun ride, filled with humour and thrills. The second half of the story has some good substance. This can make for a good family outing"

The New Indian Express gave 2.5/5 stars stating "The comedy-drama, which comes with an underlying message, does make for a one-time watch that had the potential to be a fun ride. "
