= Srinivasa Kalyanam =

Srinivasa Kalyanam may refer to these Indian films:

- Srinivasa Kalyanam (1987 film), a 1987 Telugu-language film
- Srinivasa Kalyanam (2018 film), a 2018 Telugu-language film

== See also ==
- Srinivasa Kalyana, a 2017 Indian Kannada-language film
