= Doora Theera Yaana =

Indian Kannada-language romantic drama film

- Theatrical release poster
- Directed by: Mansore
- Written by: Chethana Thirthahalli; Mansore; Krishna Hebbale
- Produced by: Devaraj R
- Starring: Vijay Krishna; Priyanka Kumar
- Cinematography: Shekar Chandra
- Edited by: Nagendra K Ujjani
- Music by: Ronada Bakkesh - Karthik Chennoji Rao
- Production company: D Creations
- Distributed by: Janani Pictures
- Release date: 11 July 2025
- Country: India
- Language: Kannada

Doora Theera Yaana (transl. Long-distance voyage) is a 2025 Indian Kannada-language romantic drama film story and directed by Mansore and starring Vijay Krishna and Priyanka Kumar.

== Cast ==
- Vijay Krishna as Akash
- Priyanka Kumar as Bhoomi
- Sruthi Hariharan as Gowri (cameo appearance)
- Sharath Lohitashwa as husband
- Sudha Belawadi as wife
- Krishna Hebbale as an innkeeper
- Arun Sagar as musician
- BM Giriraj
- Shobaraj Pavoor as Akash’s friend
- Keerthi Banu
- Naresh Bhat
- P. D. Sathish Chandra
- Poorvi Kalyani
- Sukesh
- Asha Basavaraj
- Shilpa Shetty

== Soundtrack ==
The music is composed by the duo Ronada Bakkesh and Karthik Chennoji Rao and features the folk song "Ko Ko Kolike Ranga".

Track listing
No.	Title	Lyrics	Singer(s)	Length
1.	"Doora Theera Yaana" (Title Track)	Kiran Kaverappa	Ronada Bakkesh, Eesha Suchi	4:30
2.	"Idenidu Soochane"	Kaviraj	Armaan Malik	3:46
3.	"Yenidu Maleyaagiro Haagide"	Pramod Maravanthe	Karthik, Eesha Suchi, Srilakshmi Belmannu	3:31
4.	"Manadaalada Bhaavane"	Ghouse Peer	Vasuki Vaibhav	4:10
5.	"Kolike Ranga"	T. P. Kailasam	Siddhanth Sundar, Ronada Bakkesh	3:09
6.	"Vidaaya Helide"	Pramod Maravanthe	Charan Raj	4:04
7.	"For Violin and Flute Jugalbandhi"	—	—	3:26
8.	"In The Memory of love"	—	—	2:56
Total length:				29:32

== Reception ==
A critic from The New Indian Express rated the film 3/5 stars and wrote, "Doora Theera Yaana is a film that listens, observes, and meditates. Vijay Krishna and Priyanka Kumar deliver emotionally precise performances that make you feel like you’re watching real people, not characters". A critic from The Times of India gave the film the same rating and wrote, "This isn’t a typical romantic film—it’s a reflective take on love, compatibility, and the quiet strain that can grow in long-term relationships. For those open to a more grounded and introspective love story wrapped in a scenic travel experience, Doora Theera Yaana is definitely worth a watch". A critic from Deccan Herald wrote, "What sets Doora Theera Yaana apart is its grounded, unembellished portrayal of intimacy. With quiet precision, it brings out the individuality of its characters while revealing the quiet strength of their bond, the affection, the comfort of shared routines, and the subtle gestures of care". A critic from The Hindu wrote, "Doora Theera Yaana is a one-of-its-kind attempt in Kannada cinema. A full-fledged drama in the era of event films is a bold step". A critic from OTTplay rated the film 3/5 stars and wrote, "Mansore’s latest is not a stark departure from his school of films; it’s just packaged more colourfully. It’s the kind of film that urges viewers to reflect on the subject and maybe even have a takeaway or two from it".
