= Thimmarusu =

Thimmarusu: Assignment Vaali
- Theatrical release poster
- Directed by: Sharan Koppisetty
- Written by: Veda Vyas; Sri Harsha
- Screenplay by: Sharan Koppisetty
- Story by: M. G. Srinivas
- Based on: Birbal Trilogy Case 1: Finding Vajramuni by M. G. Srinivas
- Produced by: Mahesh S. Koneru; Srujan Yarabolu
- Starring: Satyadev; Priyanka Jawalkar; Ajay; Brahmaji; Ankith Koyya; Ravi Babu
- Cinematography: Appu Prabhakar
- Edited by: Tammiraju
- Music by: Sricharan Pakala
- Production companies: East Coast Productions; S Originals
- Release date: 30 July 2021
- Country: India
- Language: Telugu

Thimmarusu: Assignment Vaali is a 2021 Indian Telugu-language crime thriller film directed by Sharan Koppisetty and produced by Mahesh S. Koneru and Yarabolu Srujan under the production company East Coast Productions and S Originals. The film stars Satyadev, Priyanka Jawalkar and Ajay in lead roles. The film is the remake of 2019 Kannada film Birbal Trilogy Case 1: Finding Vajramuni, which is based on the 2017 Korean film New Trial. The music is composed by Sricharan Pakala. The film is named after Mahamanthri Timmarusu of the Vijayanagara Empire. The film was released on 30 July 2021.

== Plot ==
The film begins with a man handing taxi driver Aravind, a police informant, a video of suspicious activity. Later that night, a man named Vasu drives across the road to see Aravind dead. Vasu is arrested by corrupt cop Bhupati Raju, who beats him up and frames him.

8 years later, once Vasu gets out on parole, Ramachandra, a lawyer takes up his case.

== Cast ==
- Satyadev as Lawyer Ramachandra "Ram"
- Priyanka Jawalkar as Anu
- Brahmaji as Sudhakar "Sudha"
- Ankith Koyya as Vasu Gopisetty
- Ajay as Bhupati Raju IPS (D.C.P)
- Ravi Babu as public prosecutor Varaha Murthy
- Chaitanya Rao Madadi as Aravind
- Harsha Chemudu as Harsha Chemudu
- Maya Nelluri as Reena Joseph
- Praveen
- Jhansi as Vasu’s mother
- Jayasri Rachakonda
- Sandhya Janak
- Sundeep Singh as Vali Bhaskar

== Production ==
Producers Mahesh S. Koneru and Yarabolu Srujan announced the film in early September 2020. It is Sharan's second directorial after Kirrak Party (2018). Principal photography of the film was started in October 2020. The producers of the film announced in December 2020 that filming was nearing completion as they were projecting a release in January 2021. In an interview to Eenadu, Satyadev said that the filming was completed in 39 days within a single schedule [sic]. The film's original story writer M. G. Srinivas was constantly in contact during the production.

== Themes and influences ==
Sangeetha Devi Dundoo felt that, in the story, Rashomon effect was used by the character Ramachandra, by which he tries to look at the crime from different points of views. In an article published by Firstpost, Hemanth Kumar wrote that the filmmaker draws parallels between historic figures (here, it is Mahamantri Timmarusu) and present-day lawyers. Sibi Jeyya felt that the protagonist of the film, Ramachandra, has similar characteristic features, when compared to Sherlock Holmes. He further said that Sharan Koppisetty has taken much inspiration from the canon of Sherlock Holmes, written by Arthur Conan Doyle.

== Music ==
Soundtrack album and film score is composed by Sricharan Pakala. The music rights were sold to Mango Music label. First single of the album, "The Thimmarusu", was released on 16 July 2021. The song was written by Kittu Vissapragada and features vocals of Raghu Dixit, Jyotsna Pakala, Ambika Sashittal and Yamini Ghantasala.

== Release ==
=== Theatrical ===
The film was earlier scheduled to release on 21 May 2021, which later was postponed due to COVID-19 pandemic in India. On 8 July 2021, it was announced that the film will be releasing on 30 July 2021. The same month, the film was certified by the Central Board of Film Certification for its release in India.

=== Home media ===
The film's digital rights were sold to Netflix and the film is set to premiere on 28 August 2021.

== Reception ==
=== Critical reception ===
Praising the performance of various actors, Sangeetha Devi Dundoo of The Hindu wrote that "‘Thimmarusu’, the Telugu remake of the Kannada film ‘Birbal’, is tauter and leverages the strengths of its lead man, Satya Dev". The Indian Express called it a "convoluted thriller" and commented that "the storyline doesn’t always hold up or hold your interest all through as the narrative feels inconsistent and never fully satisfying. At times snail-paced and repetitive, the story takes its own sweet time to unfold".

Writing for The Times of India, Sravan Vanaparthy stated: "Thimmarusu is an earnest attempt and thrills in most parts, but is otherwise let down by a contrived screenplay and a hurried climax" and gave a rating of three out of five. The Hans India too rated the film 3 out of 5 and wrote that "Satyadev's performance, Brahmaji's humor, story, and twists are major highlights of this film". A critic of Deccan Chronicle praised the film's cinematography, editing and music. He further added that the is a decent crime thriller with a unique backdrop and engrossing screenplay.

=== Box office ===
In its opening day, the film collected a distributors' share of ₹ 0.56 crore.
