= P. D. Sathish Chandra =

Indian actor

- Occupation: Actor
- Years active: 1992-present
- Notable work: Paddu in Panduranga Vittala

P. D. Sathish Chandra is an Indian actor who works in Kannada plays and films.

== Career ==
P. D. Sathish Chandra worked for The Hindu before working on the founding team of Red FM in Bangalore. He worked for Red RM for eighteen months and helped found the Gulbarga, Mangalore and Mysore stations. He worked as the programming head for Radio Mirchi 98.3 Bangalore. He gained recognition for his role as Pandu in Panduranga Vittala on Zee Kannada, which ran for five years with 1,336 episodes. He hosted the spoof TV shot Vaaranna on Public TV. He works as a mentor for the Kala Soudha theatre space in Bangalore. He founded the performing arts organization Pradarshana Kala Samsthe. His first major film role was the villain in the Malayalam film Kutty Srank (2010). During the COVID-19 pandemic, he made a video book along with fifty-one other actors. He is a frequent actor in M. G. Srinivas's films and played a steampunk-esque character Time in Old Monk (2022).

== Theatre ==
- 13 Margosa Mahal
- Hosa Belaku
- Katha Sangama (4 roles)

== Filmography ==
| Year | Film | Role | Notes |
|---|---|---|---|
| 2007 | Aa Dinagalu | | |
| 2010 | Minugu | | |
| 2010 | Kutty Srank | Mooppen | Malayalam film |
| 2011 | Lifeu Ishtene | | |
| 2013 | Parari | | |
| 2014 | Abhimanyu | | |
| 2016 | ...Re | Ghost | |
| 2019 | Yajamana | Worker | |
| 2019 | Bell Bottom | Photographer Gurupada | |
| 2019 | 99 | Giri | |
| 2019 | I Love You | Maalinga | |
| 2018 | Nanjundi Kalyana | | |
| 2018 | Thayige Thakka Maga | | |
| 2020 | Shivaji Surathkal | Vidhyasagar | |
| 2020 | ACT 1978 | Aravinda Nadiger | |
| 2022 | Old Monk | Time | |
| 2022 | Harikathe Alla Girikathe | Bank Manager | |
| 2025 | Doora Theera Yaana | | credited as P. D. Sathish |
| 2025 | Arasayyana Prema Prasanga | Basavalinga | |
| 2025 | Kantara: Chapter 1 | Gunananda | |
| 2026 | Common Man | | |

== Television ==
| Title | Role | Channel | Notes |
|---|---|---|---|
| Panduranga Vittala | Padmanabha (Paddu) | Zee Kannada | |
| Bhale Basava | Hanuman | Zee Kannada | |
| Galli Galli Sim Sim | | Cartoon Network; Pogo TV; DD National | Hindi TV series |
| Paapa Pandu 2 | Boxer Balram | Colors Super | |
| Yakhingaadtaaro | Padhmanabh | | remake of Friends |
| Varanna | Host | Public TV | |
| Seetha Raama | Charan D | Zee Kannada | |
