= Velle (film) =

2021 Indian film by Deven Munjal

- Theatrical release poster
- Directed by: Deven Munjal
- Written by: Pankaj Kumar
- Story by: Harish Dinkar
- Based on: Brochevarevarura (Telugu) by Vivek Athreya
- Produced by: Nandini Sharma; Aarushi Malhotra; Rajnish Khanuja
- Starring: Abhay Deol; Mouni Roy; Karan Deol; Anya Singh
- Cinematography: Anshul Chobey
- Edited by: Dharmendra Sharma
- Music by: Score: Somesh Saha; Songs: Rochak Kohli; Jasleen Royal; JAM8; Yug Bhusal; Sohail Sen
- Production companies: Ajay Devgn FFilms; Intercut Entertainment; Abhishek Pictures
- Distributed by: PVR Pictures
- Release date: 10 December 2021
- Running time: 124 minutes
- Country: India
- Language: Hindi
- Budget: ₹12 crore
- Box office: ₹19.36 crore

Velle (transl. Idler) is a 2021 Indian Hindi-language crime comedy film directed by Deven Munjal, written by Pankaj Kaumar from a story by Harish Dinkar, and produced by Aarushi Malhotra, Nandini Sharma and Rajnish Khanuja under Intercut Entertainment, with Devgn Films serving as presenter. A remake of the 2019 Telugu film Brochevarevarura, the film stars Abhay Deol, Mouni Roy, Karan Deol, debutantes Savant Singh Premi and Visshesh Tiwari, Anya Singh, Mahesh Thakur, Zakir Hussain, and Rajesh Kumar in pivotal roles. The film follows four friends Riya, Rahul, Rambo and Ranju who live carefree lives. When Riya's father tells her to stay away from the friends, the other three friends come up with a plan to teach him a lesson. The film was released on 10 December 2021.

== Plot ==
Riya, a school principal's daughter and her gang of high school friends, Rahul, Rambo, and Raju, lead carefree lives full of mischief. However, when she's warned to stay away from the group by her father, the group decide to teach him a lesson. Elsewhere, Rishi, a writer, plans to narrate a film to a budding actress Rohini, who develops an attraction towards him.

== Cast ==
- Abhay Deol as Rishi Singh
- Mouni Roy as Rohini Roy
- Karan Deol as Rahul Agarwal
- Savant Singh Premi as Ramesh "Rambo" Bhatia
- Vishesh Tiwari as Rajeshwar "Raju" Prasad
- Anya Singh as Riya Sharma
- Mahesh Thakur as Ravikant Agarwal, Rahul's father
- Zakir Hussain as Radhe Shyam "RS" Sharma, Riya's father
- Anurag Arora as Randhir
- Rajesh Kumar as Police Inspector Rajni Verma

== Production ==
Filming commenced from 10 July 2021 in Gautam Budh Nagar UP. The majority of filming took place in Greater Noida and shooting was completed in August 2021.

== Soundtrack ==
Velle

Soundtrack album by Rochak Kohli, Jasleen Royal, JAM8, Sohail Sen and Yug Bhusal
- Released: 23 November 2021
- Recorded: 2021
- Genre: Feature film soundtrack
- Length: 22:10
- Language: Hindi
- Label: Zee Music Company

Official audio
- Velle - Full Album on YouTube

The music was composed by Rochak Kohli, Jasleen Royal, JAM8, Yug Bhusal and Sohail Sen. Lyrics were written by Siddharth–Garima, Bipin Das, Vayu, and Aditya Sharma.

Track listing
No.	Title	Lyrics	Music	Singer(s)	Length
1.	"Uddne Do"	Siddharth–Garima, Bipin Das	JAM8	Amit Mishra	2:55
2.	"Raja Boy"	Vayu	Rochak Kohli	Mika Singh, Vayu	3:34
3.	"Yaaron Ka Bulaava"	Vayu	Rochak Kohli	Armaan Malik, Asees Kaur	4:19
4.	"Khayali Ishq"	Siddharth–Garima	Sohail Sen	Mohit Chauhan	2:28
5.	"Udd Chaliyan"	Aditya Sharma	Jasleen Royal	Jasleen Royal, Shahid Mallya	3:12
6.	"Raakh Ka Dariya"	Siddharth–Garima	Sohail Sen	Divya Kumar	3:08
7.	"Shukar Manavaan"	Siddharth–Garima	Yug Bhusal	Armaan Malik	2:34
Total length:					22:10

== Reception ==
=== Critical response ===
Hiren Kotwani from The Times of India gave the film 2.5 stars out of 5 and summed up saying, "The first half seems to be taking the film’s title too seriously and is a little too ‘chilled out’ and meandering. It’s only at the interval point when more things happen, and the movie moves into higher gear. And the second half more than makes up for the ‘vellapanti’-filled first and also keeps you glued to the screen proceedings even though you half-anticipate them."
