= Brochevarevarura =

2019 Indian film by Vivek Athreya

- Theatrical release poster
- Directed by: Vivek Athreya
- Written by: Vivek Athreya
- Produced by: Vijay Kumar Manyam
- Starring: Sree Vishnu; Nivetha Thomas; Nivetha Pethuraj; Satyadev; Priyadarshi; Rahul Ramakrishna
- Cinematography: Sai Sriram
- Edited by: Ravi Teja Girijala
- Music by: Vivek Sagar
- Production company: Manyam Productions
- Release date: 28 June 2019
- Running time: 138 minutes
- Country: India
- Language: Telugu
- Budget: ₹3–7 crore
- Box office: est. ₹20 crore

Brochevarevarura (transl. Who shall save the day?) (Note: Broche Varevaru Ra translates to the literal meaning "Who shall save the day". It was named after the popular Telugu composition of Mysore Vasudevachar in Raga Kamas of Carnatic music.) is a 2019 Indian Telugu-language crime comedy film written and directed by Vivek Athreya and produced by Vijay Kumar Manyam under the banner of Manyam Productions. The film features Sree Vishnu, Nivetha Thomas, Nivetha Pethuraj, Satyadev, Priyadarshi, and Rahul Ramakrishna play supporting roles. The music was composed by Vivek Sagar while the cinematography and editing were done by Sai Sriram and Ravi Teja Girijala, respectively.

The film released worldwide on 28 June 2019, and received positive reviews from critics. The film was remade in Kannada as Govinda Govinda (2021) and in Hindi as Velle (2021).

== Plot ==
Vishal, an aspiring film director, struggles to cast major actors for his low budget film. He sends a short film based on his script to actress Shalini, who is impressed and agrees to meet him at a restaurant. There, Vishal begins narrating his film's plot.

Meanwhile, college principal Radha Krishna enrolls his estranged daughter, Mithra, in his institution following her mother's death. Mithra meets a notorious group of chronic underachievers known as the "R3" batch: Rahul, Rambabu aka Rambo, and Rakesh aka Rocky. Mithra, who prefers classical dance over academics, quickly bonds with R3. When Radha Krishna ignores Mithra's complaint about a tuition teacher's inappropriate behavior, Rahul offers to help her run away to pursue dancing. To raise money, Mithra stage-manages her own kidnapping with R3, successfully extorting ₹8 lakh from her father. During the scheme, R3 beats up the tuition teacher but accidentally injures an innocent bystander.

While Radha Krishna turns to his police officer friend Srinu for help, Mithra is abducted by real criminals, who demand a ransom from R3. As Vishal pauses his narration, he and Shalini travel together for the project, and she falls in love with him. During a later narration session, Vishal learns that his father was severely injured, unaware that R3 caused the accident, and urgently needs ₹10 lakh for surgery. Shalini withdraws the funds from a bank to assist him. Meanwhile, Rocky spots Shalini leaving the bank and targets her car. R3 causes Shalini's vehicle to crash and steals the cash, though Rahul unknowingly drops his mobile phone at the scene.

Both Vishal and Shalini are hospitalized following the crash. R3 panics after realizing that they lost the phone containing the kidnapper's contact details, while the kidnappers prepare to sell Mithra when their calls go unanswered. Vishal seeks to recover the stolen money, while Rahul searches for his phone. Both deduce that a mentally challenged local man took the device, leading to a simultaneous search across the city. Meanwhile, R3 identifies a suspect after spotting Mithra's bag in a shared auto-rickshaw with the kidnapper's daughter. A chaotic chase ensues when Vishal and R3 cross paths, but Rahul escapes with the phone.

Before the kidnappers can move Mithra, she causes a vehicular disturbance, attracting the police, who rescue her. Vishal learns that his father's surgery was completed after Shalini secretly arranged additional funds. Shalini confesses her feelings to Vishal, who asks for time to process her proposal while she reaffirms her commitment to his film. The duo then receives an anonymous package at the hospital containing the stolen ₹10 lakh alongside an apology note from R3.

Srinu convinces Radha Krishna to acknowledge his flawed parenting. When Mithra calls Rahul from the police station, he advises her to reconcile with her father instead. Radha Krishna arrives, apologizes, confronts the tuition teacher, and enrolls Mithra in a classical dance academy. Mithra attempts an indirect romantic gesture towards Rahul, which he fails to grasp. Vishal begins production on his debut film starring Shalini, while R3 reflects on their future.

== Cast ==
- Sree Vishnu as Rahul
- Nivetha Thomas as Mithra
- Nivetha Pethuraj as Shalini
- Satyadev as Vishal
- Priyadarshi as Rakesh "Rocky"
- Rahul Ramakrishna as Rambabu "Rambo"
- Srikanth Iyengar as Radha Krishna, Mithra's father
- Harsha Vardhan as CI Srinu, Radha Krishna's friend
- Sivaji Raja as Prasad, Rahul's father
- Shafi as Constable Ashok Kumar
- Dinesh Koushika as Soori
- Jhansi as Physics Teacher
- Raj Madiraju as Film Producer
- Ajay Ghosh as Kidnapper
- Chevella Ravi as Beggar
- Appaji Ambarisha Darbha as Vishal's father
- Ajitesh Josyula as Patient in Clinic
- Amolkar Peerla as Angry Nurse in Clinic
- Satvik Gurram as Lazy Compounder in Clinic
- Teja Silaparasetty as Skeleton in Clinic
- Rajesh Khanna

== Production ==
The film was officially launched in August 2018, with Sree Vishnu playing the lead role, marking his second collaboration with director Vivek Athreya after Mental Madhilo (2017). Principal photography commenced very soon after the launch. Later, Nivetha Thomas confirmed her presence in the project, along with Nivetha Pethuraj, who worked with Vishnu in the director's previous film. The production unit completed the first schedule at Guntur in November 2018, and moved to Tenali for the second schedule. The film wrapped up shooting in early March 2019.

== Soundtrack ==
Brochevarevarura

Soundtrack album by Vivek Sagar
- Released: 24 May 2019
- Recorded: 2019
- Genre: Feature film soundtrack
- Length: 32:33
- Language: Telugu
- Label: Aditya Music
- Producer: Vivek Sagar

Vivek Sagar chronology
Falaknuma Das (2019)	Brochevarevarura (2019)	HIT: The First Case (2020)
External audio
- Audio Jukebox on YouTube

The soundtrack album featured seven songs composed by Vivek Sagar with lyrics by Ramajogayya Sastry, Hasith Goli, Bharadwaj and Krishna Kanth. The film's first single "Vagalaadi" was released on 30 April 2019. The second single track "Doragiri" was released later on 5 May 2019. The third single track "Putukku Zara Zara" which released on 15 May 2019, features traditional lyrics from "Pannendu Metla Kinnera" written by Shri Dasari Ranga in Kalaa Telanganam. The fourth song "Talapu Talupu" was released on 20 May 2019. The full soundtrack album was released by Aditya Music on 24 May 2019.

The album received positive reviews, with critics noting the mix of folksy-street tunes with the classical-contemporary notes. Neetishta Nyayapati of The Times of India, stated that "The album of Brochevarevarura has something for everyone for sure. The OST doesn’t just serve the purpose of delivering hummable songs; it also gives an insight into the kind of film it’s going to be. Apart from the vocalists, Vivek Sagar’s guitar sets the tone for most of the numbers and effectively so. While Vagalaadi is a crowd favourite and will remain so, give the rest of the numbers a chance this weekend if you’re in the mood for some good music."

No.	Title	Lyrics	Singer(s)	Length
1.	"Vaale Chinukule"	Hasith Goli	Sooraj Santhosh	5:11
2.	"Putukku Zara Zara"	Hasith Goli	Anthony Daasan, Balaji Dake	4:32
3.	"Doragari"	Bharadwaj	Vivek Sagar	5:14
4.	"Talapu Talupu"	Ramajogayya Sastry	Vandana Srinivasan	4:44
5.	"Vagalaadi"	Hasith Goli	Vivek Sagar, Balaji Dake, Ram Miriyala, Manisha Eerabathini	4:23
6.	"Chalaname Chitramu"	Krishna Kanth	Bhadra Rajin	2:45
7.	"Brochevare"	Krishna Kanth	Anurag Kulkarni	3:44

== Release ==
The official title logo was released on 31 December 2018, on New Year's Eve. On 15 March 2019, the team released the 1-minute video teaser, titled Visual Tale, which reveals the plot line and characters through caricatures. The film's first look poster which features Sree Vishnu, Rahul Ramakrishna and Priyadarshi Pullikonda, was released on 21 March 2019, coinciding with Holi. Another first look poster featuring Nivetha Thomas, was released on 30 March 2019. The official teaser was unveiled on 20 April 2019. The film's pre-release event was held in Hyderabad on 22 June 2019, with the cast and crew along with Ram Pothineni and Nara Rohit as the chief guests. The film released worldwide on 28 June 2019.

== Reception ==
The News Minute gave 3 out of 5 stars and wrote "Brochevarevaru Ra floats on impossible coincidences, and plays with incidents, which probably would play out in real life in one in a million circumstances. Things end conveniently, as they are likely to happen in such high-stakes-plan-gone-wrong kind of stories. However, this shouldn't be a cause for concern. The director doesn't dig a hole too deep for logic and makes sure the narrative pans out as a freakish set of events that are nevertheless, a lot of fun to follow." Y Sunita Chowdhary of The Hindu wrote "This simple, light-hearted story of friends is worth the time and money." Neetishta Nyayapati of The Times of India gave 3 out of 5 stars stating "Go watch Brochevarevaru Ra if crime comedy, coming-of-age films and comic capers are your cup of tea because Vivek Athreya’s film delivers all that and more. Just don’t expect the usual commercial elements or even a love story thrown in, for you will be left disappointed. Watch this one for the freshness and laidback-ness of it all and you will love it."

Sankeerthana Varma of Film Companion wrote "Brochevarevarura populates itself with great characters and places them in circumstances where they can shine their eclectic light at us". Cinema Express gave the film a rating of 3.5 out of 5 and stated "This is a well-written and a well-rounded film, which plays around in the sandbox of human emotions." Venkat Arikatla from Greatandhra gave the film 3 out of 5 stars and wrote "Brochevarevura is a pretty simple crime comedy that is peppered with interesting screenplay and offers some genuine laughs." 123Telugu gave the film 3.25 out of 5 and stated "Brochevarevarura is a crime comedy which has good fun and entertaining thrills. The fun is generated in a simple manner and keeps you hooked for the most part of the film. The lead cast performance will surely win your hearts. However, things become a bit slow and predictable in the second half but that does not stop you from having a good time watching this film." Indiaglitz gave the film a rating of 2.75 out of 5 and stated 'Brochevarevaru Ra' is a crime comedy. Situational comedy, characterizations, breezy screenplay in the first half are its assets. On the other hand, the second half comes undone with convenient, half-baked writing."

It is considered as one of the "25 Greatest Telugu films of the decade" by Film Companion. It was also listed in the Top 7 best Telugu films of the year 2019 by India Today.

== Awards and nominations ==
Date of ceremony	Award	Category	Recipient(s) and nominee(s)	Result	Ref.
11 January 2020	Zee Cine Awards Telugu	Best Screenplay	Vivek Athreya	Won	
11 January 2020	Zee Cine Awards Telugu	Best Comedian	Priyadarshi Pulikonda	Won	
11 January 2020	Zee Cine Awards Telugu	Best Comedian	Rahul Ramakrishna	Won	
28 March 2020	Critics Choice Film Awards	Best Film	Brochevarevarura	Nominated	
28 March 2020	Critics Choice Film Awards	Best Director	Vivek Athreya	Nominated	
28 March 2020	Critics Choice Film Awards	Best Writing	Vivek Athreya	Won	
18 September 2021	South Indian International Movie Awards	Best Comedian - Telugu	Brochevarevarura	Nominated	
18 September 2021	South Indian International Movie Awards	Best Debutant Producer - Telugu	Manyam Productions	Nominated	

== Remake ==
Brochevarevarura has been remade in two languages. In Kannada it is titled as Govinda Govinda directed by debut director Tilak and produced by Shailendra Babu and Ravi R Garini, and stars Sumanth Shailendra, Bhavana and Kavitha Gowda. The Hindi remake rights were bought by Sunny Deol, and stars his son Karan Deol as lead actor. The film is titled Velle, directed by Deven Munjal and featuring Karan Deol, Anya Singh, Abhay Deol and Mouni Roy.
