= Topiwala =

- Theatrical Poster
- Directed by: M. G. Srinivas
- Written by: Upendra
- Produced by: Ajinkya Vinchurkar
- Starring: Upendra; Bhavana
- Cinematography: Shreesha Kuduvalli
- Edited by: Sri Crazymindz
- Music by: V. Harikrishna
- Production company: Crazymindz
- Release date: 15 March 2013
- Country: India
- Language: Kannada
- Budget: ₹7 crores
- Box office: ₹11 crores

Topiwala is a 2013 Indian Kannada political satire film written by Upendra and directed by M. G. Srinivas. The film stars Upendra and Bhavana in the lead roles. Kanakapura Sreenivas and K. P. Srikanth jointly produced this venture under R.S. Productions banner. V. Harikrishna composed the music. The film was released on 15 March 2013 in 150 theaters.

== Premise ==
Basak wants to steal black money of corrupt politicians kept in a Swiss bank. He needs a secret code for that, which is with a mentally infirm man, who names himself as Mr. India but has lost his memory due to an accident. How Basak recovers the code and whether he will be successful in developing the country's economy with the black money form the crux of the plot.

== Cast ==
- Upendra as Basak
- Bhavana as Suman Bedi
- Rangayana Raghu as Ramanayana Raghu
- Maithreyi as Malashri
- P. Ravi Shankar as Sarkar
- Vijanath Biradar as Mr India
- Raju Talikote
- Achyuth Kumar as Lokayuktha Loki
- Mithra
- Mukti Mohan as an Item number

== Production ==
=== Casting ===
Topiwala went on floors on 14 March 2012. The script and screenplay of the film were written by Upendra and radio jockey M. G. Srinivas was selected to direct the film. Actress Bhavana of Jackie fame was cast in the female lead. The film was produced by Kanakapura Sreenivas, who produced Upendra's Omkara in 2004. The film also stars debutante actress Maithreyi, Rangayana Raghu, and Raju Talikote in supporting roles while Ravishankar plays the antagonist. Vijanath Biradar has a surprise cameo. Mukti Mohan, a participant of Star One's dance reality show, Zara Nachke Dikha, was brought in for an item song. The film was successfully wrapped on 20 December 2012.

=== Promotions ===
At the first press meet of the film, held in December 2012, producer Kanakapura Srinivas said that a younger team was brought in for the film to try to generate fresh thoughts in presentation. "Now, we have Topiwala with a young team which is sure to create new bench marks", said Sreenivas. Upendra described the film as a political satire based on current affairs and corruption. "The film is based on incidents that happen in contemporary times. Political incidents are part of the script. It is a humorous commentary on every distortion that we see in our society", said Upendra.

== Soundtrack ==
Topiwala

Soundtrack album by V. Harikrishna
- Released: 2013
- Recorded: 2013
- Genre: Feature film soundtrack
- Length: 18:36
- Language: Kannada

Official audio
- Topiwala - Full Album on YouTube

The film's music was composed by V. Harikrishna. Audio CDs were released into the market on 13 February 2013 and an official audio launch was held at the Windsor Manor Hotel in Bangalore on 23 February 2013. All three brothers of the Rajkumar family, Shivrajkumar, Raghavendra Rajkumar, and Puneeth Rajkumar attended the audio launch along with the cast and crew of the film and other film personalities.

Track listing
No.	Title	Singer(s)	Length
1.	"Shangrila"	Mano, Priyadarshini	4:31
2.	"Topiwala"	V. Harikrishna	4:51
3.	"Girgitle Grigitle"	Vijay Prakash, Kannika Urs	4:28
4.	"Gala Gala"	Supriya Lohith, Tippu	3:43
5.	"Theme"	Instrumental	1:43
Total length:			18:36

== Reception ==
=== Critical response ===
Srikanth Srinivasa from Rediff.com wrote "The title credits are quite imaginatively done and the thoughts in the film are also ingenious but the execution could have been a lot better. Topiwaala is worth a one-time watch only for Upendra's fans. Others may be taking a risk watching it". A critic from The Times of India scored the film at 3 out of 5 stars and says "While Upendra manages to do justice to his role, Bhavana is not at all impressive. Raju Talikote bores you with his monotonous dialogues. Mythreyi playing the role of Malashri shines. Except for one song ‘Malli malli’, the music by V Harikrishna has nothing much to offer." A critic from Bangalore Mirror wrote "The first-half is jam-packed, but quite a few scenes don't make any impact.If this is a method employed to make the audience watch the film twice over, it surely doesn't work. The second half of the film is better in comparison. Though the film picks up steam towards the end, it is too late to do any damage control. The premise had potential, but the execution is poor".
