= Swathi Chinukulu (TV series) =

Indian television series

- Genre: Soap opera
- Written by: Sai Madhav; Krish Jagarlamudi
- Directed by: Malineni Radha Krishna; Kapuganti Babu
- Country of origin: India
- Original language: Telugu
- No. of episodes: 2126

Production
- Production locations: Ljubljana; Slovenia; Andhra Pradesh; Pollachi - Tamil Nadu
- Cinematography: Omprakash
- Running time: 22 minutes

Original release
- Network: E TV
- Release: 9 September 2013 – 19 September 2020

Swathi Chinukulu is an Indian Telugu Language soap opera that aired on ETV Telugu. It premiered on 9 September 2013 and ended on 19 September 2020 completing 2126 episodes.

== Plot ==
Mythili and Neelaveni are two young women with a strong bond. They live vastly different lives in opposite ends of the world and go through various struggles. Mythili a Joyous young lady has been migrated to Europe for job. Her vibrant experiences with her boss Panigrahi and his way made her fall in love with him. Neelaveni a village girl born and brought up among sentimental relationships struggling with her love feel. The story deals about these two ladies experiences and lives.

== Cast ==
- Sithara as Tulasi
- Rachana as Neelaveni
- Rachitha Mahalakshmi as Nila (former cast) (died in serial)
- Neha Gowda as Mythili
- Harikrishna as Paanigrahi
- Sindhura Darshanam
- Aadarsh
- Siddharth Varma
- Kavitha Gowda
- Preeti
- Ramyakrishnan
- Vanisree
- Sharath Banu
- Jaya Prakash Reddy as Veera Sena Reddy
- Branden Garrett
