= Pooja Lokesh =

Indian actress

- Born: Bangalore
- Occupation: Actress
- Parents: Lokesh (father); Girija Lokesh (mother)
- Relatives: Srujan Lokesh (sibling)

Pooja Lokesh is an Indian actress in the Tamil and Kannada film industry.

== Personal life ==
She is the daughter of Lokesh and Girija Lokesh and sister of Srujan Lokesh.

== Partial filmography ==
- Pooja (1996)
- Huliya (1996)
- Ulta Palta (1997)
- Yuddha (1997)
- Chatrapathy (2004)
- Magic Ajji (2005)
- Tiger Galli (2017)

== Television ==
Serials

Year	Title	Role	Channel
2003–2004	Kungumam		Sun TV
2004–2007	Kalki	Pooja	Jaya TV
2005–2006	Selvi	Pooja	Sun TV
2006	Anjali	ACP Eshwari	Sun TV
2007–2010	Athipookal	Eshwari and Durgamayee	Sun TV
2008–2011	Geethanjali		Raj TV
2009–2010	Roja Kootam	Manasa	Star Vijay
2012–2014	Mundhanai Mudichu	Prema	Sun TV
2013–2014	Muthaaram	Sandhya	Sun TV
2013–2016	Mahabharatham	Amba	Sun TV
2014	Uyirmei	Pooja	Zee Tamil
2022	Meera	Anjali	Colors Tamil
2023–2025	Seetha Raama	Bhargavi	Zee Kannada

Shows

Year	Title	Role	Channel
2006–2007	Jodi Number One Season 1	Contestant (Winner)	Star Vijay
2013–2014	Kitchen Super Star (Season 1)	Contestant (Winner)	Star Vijay
2022	Pottikku Potti	Contestant	Colors Tamil

== See also ==
- List of people from Karnataka
- Cinema of Karnataka
- List of Indian film actresses
- Cinema of India
