= Ante Sundaraniki =

2022 film by Vivek Athreya

Ante Sundaraniki!
- Theatrical release poster
- Directed by: Vivek Athreya
- Written by: Vivek Athreya
- Produced by: Naveen Yerneni; Yalamanchili Ravi Shankar
- Starring: Nani; Nazriya Nazim
- Cinematography: Niketh Bommireddy
- Edited by: Ravi Teja Girijala
- Music by: Vivek Sagar
- Production company: Mythri Movie Makers
- Distributed by: E4 Entertainment (Kerala)
- Release date: 10 June 2022
- Running time: 176 minutes
- Country: India
- Language: Telugu
- Budget: ₹30 crore
- Box office: est. ₹45 crore

Ante Sundaraniki! (transl. The thing about Sundar is!) is a 2022 Indian Telugu-language romantic comedy film written and directed by Vivek Athreya. Produced by Mythri Movie Makers, it stars Nani and Nazriya Nazim (in her Telugu debut). The film tells the story of Sundar and Leela, an interfaith couple who try to convince their parents about their marriage through a string of lies only to find themselves in more complicated situations.

Ante Sundaraniki! was announced in November 2020 with principal photography taking place between April 2021 and January 2022. The film was predominantly shot in Hyderabad and the United States. Ante Sundaraniki! was released in theatres on 10 June 2022 and opened to positive reviews from critics.

It grossed over $1 million overseas, making it Nani's seventh film to do so. The film grossed over ₹45 crore worldwide. Despite receiving positive reviews from critics, praising its narrative, performances, and technical aspects, the film failed to perform well at the box office, although it later managed to get a cult following.

== Plot ==
Kasthuri Poorna Venkata Sesha Sai Pavana Rama Sundara Prasad aka Sundar, raised in an orthodox Brahmin family, harbours a childhood dream of travelling to the United States after being scammed as a boy by a fraudster who promised him a role in a Chiranjeevi film that would be shot in the US. Now an advertising agency employee, Sundar convinces his colleague Soumya to relinquish her U.S. work trip in his favour after revealing his true motive to set a stage for his marriage with his childhood sweetheart Leela Thomas, a Christian commercial photographer. Leela and Sundar have reconnected after her ex-boyfriend Vamsi cheated on her, and they plan to marry. Anticipating severe interfaith opposition from their conservative families, they devise a plan while in the U.S. to fabricate reasons that would force their parents' consent.

In the U.S., Sundar tells his parents that he suffers from azoospermia and that Leela has agreed to marry him regardless. Simultaneously, Leela lies to her parents that she is pregnant with Sundar's child. Upon returning to India, their luggage is accidentally swapped at the airport. Sundar's father, Suryanarayana Sastry, discovers Leela's belongings while gathering relatives to discuss Sundar's condition, while Leela's family finds a Hanuman sticker on Sundar's bag. When forced by her mother, Jyothi, to take a pregnancy test, Leela fakes a positive result using Mountain Dew. Meanwhile, Sundar's childhood friend, Dr. Guru, helps cover for Sundar by falsely claiming his condition will require up to 15 years of treatment.

However, Leela's parents arrange her marriage to Joseph, a family friend willing to accept her alleged pregnancy. Desperate, Sundar admits to Joseph that the pregnancy is a lie. Though Joseph attempts to expose the truth, Leela's father calls off the wedding to avoid public scandal. Reluctantly, both families agree to Sundar and Leela's marriage, each believing their child is receiving a major concession from the other. During a joint family gathering, potential exposure is averted when Sundar's parents help relieve pregnancy-related cramps for Leela's elder sister, Pushpa, fostering mutual goodwill.

Later, Joseph reveals Sundar's confession to Jyothi, who takes Leela for a medical test. To their shock, the test is genuinely positive despite the couple never having consummated their relationship. A second opinion reveals Leela has dysgerminoma, a rare ovarian tumor that causes false-pregnancy positive results. The necessary surgery to remove the tumor leaves Leela unable to conceive. Overwhelmed, Sundar confesses the entire truth to Leela's father, Thomas.

Sastry and his mother, Rajeswari, initially demand the engagement to be cancelled due to Leela's condition, but Sundar's mother, Rama, calls out their hypocrisy, reminding them they were eager to marry off Sundar when they believed he was sterile. Realizing that his happiness transcends rigid traditions and lineage, the family relents, and Rajeswari bless the union by playing the veena she had abandoned years prior.

Sundar rushes to the hospital to support Leela through her surgery, and the couple travels to Amelia Island to complete their wedding. here, Sundar confesses he sent an anonymous childhood postcard Leela treasured, while Leela admits she always knew it was him and that her dream of marrying on the island was simply a story she fabricated to be with him.

== Cast ==
- Nani as Kasthuri Poorna Venkata Sesha Sai Pavana Rama Sundara Prasad aka "Sundar"
  - Vinny as young Sundar
- Nazriya Nazim Fahadh as Leela Thomas
  - Harika Koyilamma as young Leela
- Naresh as Kasthuri Suryanarayana Sastry, Sundar's father
- Rohini as K. Rama, Sundar's mother
- Nadhiya as Jyothi, Leela's mother
- Azhagam Perumal as Thomas, Leela's father
- Harsha Vardhan as Manager Chandra Mohan
- Prudhvi Raj as Sivarama, Sundar's uncle
- Aruna Bhikshu as Rajeswari, Sundar's grandmother
- Tanvi Ram as Pushpa, Leela's sister
  - Nomina Tara as young Pushpa
- Krheash Raj as Sagar, Pushpa’s husband
- Jaya Naidu as Sagar’s mother
- Dinesh Koushika as waiter
- Rahul Ramakrishna as Dr. Guruvesh alias Guru, Sundar's childhood friend
- Srikanth Iyengar as Jogarao, an astrologer
- Venkatesh Maha as Joseph
- Pavitra Lokesh as gynecologist Parvati
- Rupa Lakshmi as Sundar’s aunt
- S. S. Kanchi as Dr. Kukuteshwar
- Ali as Shankar. He is a fraudster in the garb of a film director and the leader of a child trafficking ring.
- Anupama Parameswaran as Soumya (extended cameo appearance)
- Sai Ronak as Vamsi Samuel (cameo)

== Production ==
=== Development ===
In April 2020, Vivek Athreya signed a project with Vijay Deverakonda which was touted to be a comedy-thriller on the lines of Athreya's previous film, Brochevarevarura (2019). The project was initially set to begin production by November 2019, but was delayed as Deverakonda could not allot dates for the project. At the meantime, Athreya also narrated a script to Nani, and impressed by it, the latter decided to be a part of the film. This was confirmed the following month, with the project being funded by Mythri Movie Makers. Production was set to begin after Nani's commitments on Tuck Jagadish and Shyam Singha Roy (both 2021). On the eve of Diwali, 13 November, the company officially confirmed the project tentatively titled #Nani28 and would star Nazriya Nazim in her Telugu cinema debut. The film's official title was revealed to be Ante Sundaraniki on 21 November 2020.

=== Pre-production ===
Vivek Athreya developed the script in late 2017, prior to his debut film Mental Madhilo. He added that "the core issue and the story would make for an exciting, contemporary social commentary". Initially, Vivek pitched another story to the production house, which required an ensemble cast. The company then asked on a script that suited Nani, which resulted in developing this script and narrated to Nani; the latter's likening to the script eventually brought him on board. Later, Nani suggested Nazriya's involvement in the film. Vivek then narrated the script to Nazriya in a linear approach and with her enthusiasm, he then gave her a detailed non-linear narration that lasted for a few hours. Nazriya then learnt Telugu with the help of a tutor and also dubbed for the film. Athreya then conducted script reading sessions with other supporting cast members, Rohini, Nadhiya, Naresh, Harsha Vardhan, Rahul Ramakrishna, to prepare for their roles.

=== Filming ===
Principal photography of the film began on 16 April 2021. The film was predominantly shot in Hyderabad, with sporadic schedules in United States. Filming wrapped up on 23 January 2022.

== Music ==
The film score and soundtrack album of the film is composed by Vivek Sagar. The music rights were acquired by Saregama.

== Release ==
=== Theatrical ===
The film released theatrically on 10 June 2022. It was announced in January 2022 that the film was going to be released in the summer of 2022. In February 2022, the makers announced that they would release the film in any of seven dates starting from 22 April 2022 to 10 June 2022. In the same month, the makers announced the film's release date as 10 June 2022. Apart from the original version, the film was also dubbed in Tamil under the title Adade Sundara and in Malayalam under the title Aha Sundara.

The film's theatrical rights were sold at ₹30 crore.

=== Home media ===
The film was streamed on Netflix on 8 July 2022 in Telugu and dubbed versions of Tamil and Malayalam languages.

== Reception ==
=== Critical reception ===
Ante Sundaraniki received positive reviews from critics. Manoj Kumar R of The Indian Express rated the film 4 out of 5 stars and wrote "Nani effortlessly fits into the role of a rebellious man, who comes up with masterful lies as easy as he breathes. Nazriya Fahadh's screen presence adds a lot to the appeal of the movie". Siby Jeyya of India Herald rated the film 4 out of 5 stars and wrote "Director Vivek took a story of interfaith marriage, adding comedy rooted in mindlessly following religious customs, and drama rooted in striving to achieve a balance between family and love". Critic Latha Srinivasan wrote in Firstpost that Nani and Nazriya shone in this romantic comedy cum family drama and gave it 3 stars on 5. She wrote, "The director has packed a lot of depth into the film." Neeshita Nyayapati of The Times of India rated the film 3.5 out of 5 stars and wrote "Ante Sundaraniki is at its best when the stellar cast are mouthing off one-liners that are not just relatable but hilarious. Nani shines in the role of Sundar that's right down his alley while Nazriya fits right into the skin of Leela". A critic for Sakshi Post rated the film 3 out of 5 stars and wrote "Ante Sundarainki is an out and out family entertainer and tailor-made film for Nani fans".

Sowmya Rajendran of The News Minute rated the film 3 out of 5 stars and wrote "The film has good performances by the cast and is fun in parts, but the convoluted plot and lengthy runtime test your patience". Janani K of India Today rated the film 3 out of 5 stars and wrote "Ante Sundaraniki is a film that relies on top-notch performances and interesting sequences". Murali Krishna CH of Cinema Express rated the film 2.5 out of 5 stars and wrote "The film has some good moments, some genuinely funny lines and first-rate performances. Compared to the recent rom-coms, this film is worth giving a shot".

=== Box office ===
Ante Sundaraniki grossed ₹7.5 crore worldwide on its opening day, including ₹4 crore from Andhra Pradesh and Telangana, and $438,000 (₹3.4 crore) from the United States. The film grossed ₹26.25 crore in its first weekend. In its first week, the film grossed over ₹32.6 crore worldwide with a distributor's share of ₹18.39 crore. Ante Sundaraniki grossed over $1 million in the United States, making it Nani's seventh film to do so.

As of 2022, Ante Sundaraniki grossed over ₹45 crore at the box office.
