= Mansore =

Indian filmmaker, lyricist and director

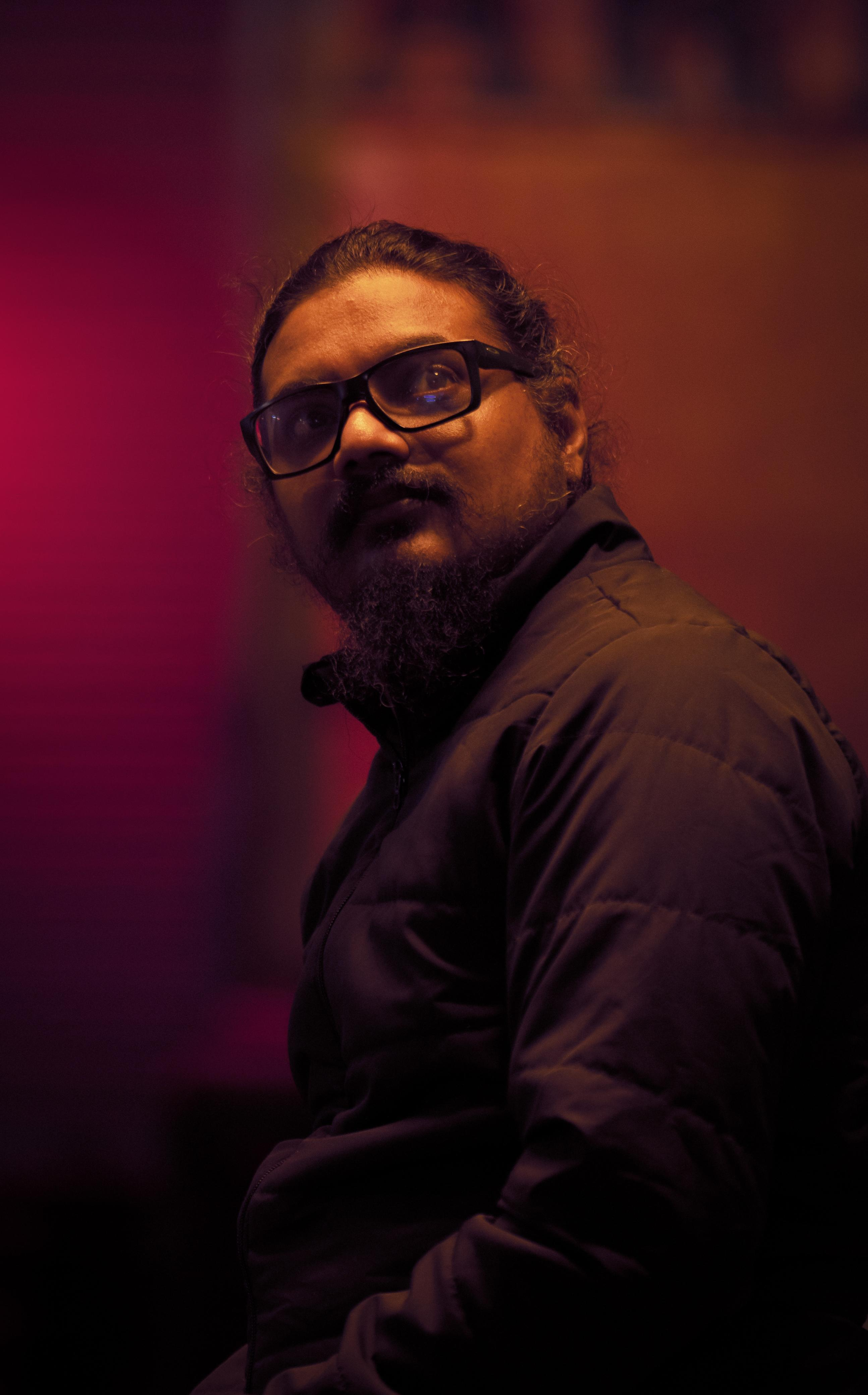
- Mansore during shoot of his movie 19.20.21
- Born: Manjunatha Somakeshava Reddy
- Occupations: Director, screenwriter, lyricist
- Years active: 2014–present

Mansore is an Indian filmmaker, screenwriter, and lyricist working in the Kannada film industry. He is known for humanitarian films.

== Career ==
Mansore holds a Post Graduate Diploma in Visual Arts from the College of Fine Arts, Karnataka Chitrakala Parishath, Bangalore. As a visual artist, he has participated in many contemporary visual cultural discourses, by producing paintings, video artworks and holding many exhibitions of his creative artworks. Mansore is well known Indian film director works in Kannada film industry.

Mansore who has directed the 62nd Best Regional film National award-winning and Best Film state award-winning kannada film "Harivu (2014)" and 66th Best Regional National Award-winning movie "Nathicharami (2018)". Nathicharmi has also won 4 individual national awards and recorded highest awards winning film of the year 2018.

Along with national awards the movie has won 4 filmfare south awards and an international award NETPAC at Biffes 2019 . Nathicharami got world premiere screening in India story section at MAMI-2018. Both Harivu and Nathicharami have been appreciated by critics & public alike.

ACT-1978 (2020) is Mansore's 3rd directorial work. It was the first south Indian fresh movie released in Theatres after first covid-unlock. With numerous housefull shows, this movie has crossed very important 75 days milestone in theatres. Along with success in theatres ACT-1978 also selected for Indian prestigious Goa International film festival, Under Panorama Section 2021 and 2022 Bengaluru international film festival. Also, the movie went on to win four South Filmfare awards including best film in 2022. 19.20.21 (2022) is a Mansore's 4th movie released on 3 Mar, 2023. 19.20.21 was the top rating received movie in kannada 2023 both from critics and audience and also this movie received special jury award in Biffes 2023. His fifth movie, he moved away from the conventional style of social narration to give us a love story called Doora Theera Yaana and it was released in 2025.

== Filmography ==
Year	Film	Notes	Ref
2014	Harivu	National award Best regional film Kannada	
2014	Harivu	State Award for Best film Best Director (HLN Simha award)	
2018	Nathicharami	National Award for best regional film Kannada	
2018	Nathicharami	National Award for best Lyrics (Mansore)	
2018	Nathicharami	Filmfare award for Best Director	
2018	Nathicharami	NETPAC award at Biffes	
2020	ACT 1978	Official selection for Indian Panorama	
2020	ACT 1978	Filmfare award for Best Film	
2020	ACT 1978	Best Director award at Chandanavana film awards	
2023	19.20.21	Best Film Jury Award Biffes 2023	
2023	19.20.21	Best Production Design Prajavani Cine Awards	
2025	Doora Theera Yaana		
