= Seetha Raama =

Indian Kannada language TV series

- Genre: Drama
- Directed by: Sapna Krishna
- Starring: See below
- Country of origin: India
- Original language: Kannada
- No. of episodes: 490

Production
- Production locations: Bengaluru, Karnataka
- Camera setup: Multi-camera
- Running time: 22 minutes

Original release
- Network: Zee Kannada
- Release: 17 July 2023 – 30 May 2025

Related
- Majhi Tujhi Reshimgath

Seetha Raama is an Indian Kannada language drama series airing on Zee Kannada which premiered from 17 July 2023. The show is an official remake of Zee Marathi's TV series Majhi Tujhi Reshimgath. It stars Vaishnavi Gowda, Gagan Chinnappa and Rithu Singh in lead roles.

The show is dubbed into Malayalam as Seetha Ramam from 27 May 2024 to 9 August 2025 on Zee Keralam, dubbed into Telugu as Seetha Raama from 12 August 2024 to 28 February 2025 on Zee Telugu and also dubbed into Tamil as Raman Thediya Seethai from 17 March to 17 May 2025 on Zee Tamil.

== Cast ==
=== Main ===
- Vaishnavi Gowda as Seetha
- Gagan Chinnappa as Sriram Desai
- Rithu Singh as Sihi

=== Recurring ===
- Pooja Lokesh as Bhargavi Desai
- Mukhyamantri Chandru as Suryaprakash Desai (Suri)
- Ashok Sharma as Ashok
- Meghana Shankarappa as Priya
- P. D. Sathish Chandra as Charan D

== Adaptations ==
| Language | Title | Original release | Network(s) | Last aired | Notes |
|---|---|---|---|---|---|
| Marathi | Majhi Tujhi Reshimgath माझी तुझी रेशीमगाठ | 23 August 2021 | Zee Marathi | 22 January 2023 | Original |
| Kannada | Seetha Raama ಸೀತಾ ರಾಮ | 17 July 2023 | Zee Kannada | 30 May 2025 | Remake |
| Odia | Shree ଶ୍ରୀ | 22 January 2024 | Zee Sarthak | 1 June 2024 | Remake |
| Hindi | Main Hoon Saath Tere मैं हूँ साथ तेरे | 29 April 2024 | Zee TV | 18 August 2024 | Remake |
| Bengali | Ke Prothom Kachhe Eshechi কে প্রথম কাছে এসেছি | 27 May 2024 | Zee Bangla | 22 September 2024 | Remake |
