= Huliya (film) =

1996 Indian Kannada-language film

- Directed by: K. V. Raju
- Written by: K. V. Raju
- Produced by: G. Govind; Kadur Ramesh
- Starring: Devaraj; Archana; Pooja Lokesh; Avinash
- Cinematography: Mallikarjun
- Edited by: Shyam Yadav
- Music by: Sadhu Kokila
- Production company: Shri Raghavendra Films
- Release date: 1996
- Running time: 143 minutes
- Country: India
- Language: Kannada

Huliya is a 1996 Indian Kannada-language action drama film written and directed by K. V. Raju and produced by G. Govind and Kadur Ramesh under the Shri Raghavendra Films banner. It stars Devaraj and Archana. Apart from them, the film stars Pooja Lokesh, Avinash, Srinivasa Murthy, Sanketh Kashi in important roles. Sadhu Kokila composed the film's score and soundtrack.

== Cast ==
The cast:

- Devaraj as Huliya, innocent villager
- Archana as Mydani, wife of Huliya
- Pooja Lokesh as Rekha, journalist
- Avinash as Madagi, crooked politician
- Srinivasa Murthy as Chief Minister
- Lohithaswa as Newspaper Editor
- Sharath Lohitashwa as Raama, child trafficker
- Sanket Kashi as Shegani, broker
- Bank Janardhan as District Commissioner
- Mandeep Roy as pimp in brothel
- Sindhu Menon (credited as Baby Sindhu) as Puttagowri, Huliya's daughter

== Soundtrack ==
Sadhu Kokila composed the soundtrack album for the film.

No.	Title	Singer(s)	Length
1.	"Banna Bannadaramane"	Rajesh Krishnan, Manjula Gururaj
2.	"Appa Appa"	Nanditha
3.	"Brahma Devane"	C. Ashwath
4.	"Aase Hakki Kare Needide"	S. P. Balasubrahmanyam, S. Janaki
5.	"Manushhatwavannu"	S. P. Balasubrahmanyam

== Awards ==
1995–96: Karnataka State Film Awards - Best Supporting Actress - Pooja Lokesh
