= Arasayyana Prema Prasanga =

Indian Kannada-language comedy-drama film

- Theatrical release poster
- Directed by: J. V. R. Deepu
- Written by: J. V. R. Deepu
- Produced by: Meghashree Rajesh
- Starring: Mahantesh Hiremath; Rashmitha R. Gowda; P. D. Sathish Chandra; Raghu Ramanakoppa; Paavana Gowda; Mandya Ramesh
- Cinematography: Guruprasad Narnad
- Edited by: Suneil Kashyap HN
- Music by: Praveen B. V.
- Production company: Raj Kamala Pictures
- Release date: 19 September 2025
- Running time: 123 minutes
- Country: India
- Language: Kannada

Arasayyana Prema Prasanga is a 2025 Indian Kannada-language comedy-drama film written and directed by J. V. R. Deepu and produced by Meghashree Rajesh. The film stars Mahantesh Hiremath and Rashmitha R. Gowda in lead roles, alongside P. D. Sathish Chandra and Raghu Ramanakoppa. It was theatrically released on 19 September 2025.

== Plot ==
Arasayya, a warm-hearted and simple man from a rural milieu, navigates the search for love and family belonging while coping with a series of comic misunderstandings and heartfelt moments. The film follows Arasayya's relationships with his family and his romantic interest, showing both humour and the emotional costs of small-town expectations.

== Cast ==
- Mahantesh Hiremath as Arasayya
- Rashmitha R. Gowda as Rashmitha
- P. D. Sathish Chandra
- Raghu Ramanakoppa
- Vijay Chendoor
- M. S. Jahangir

== Production ==
The film was directed by debutant J. V. R. Deepu and produced by Meghashree Rajesh. Promotional material, including the trailer, was released by A2 Music in late August 2025.

== Music ==
The soundtrack was composed by Praveen B. V. and Pradeep B. V., with lyrics by Krishna Ritti. Songs such as "Ayyayyo Rama" were released on A2 Music's official channel.

== Release ==
Arasayyana Prema Prasanga was released theatrically on 19 September 2025. BookMyShow listings confirmed the runtime as 2h 3m and the film's U certification.

== Reception ==
Reviews were mixed-to-positive. The Times of India gave the film 2.5/5, praising performances but critiquing uneven writing. The New Indian Express described it as a "feel-good entertainer" celebrating small-town warmth. The Bangalore Mirror highlighted its humour and sincerity.
