= Act 1978 =

Indian Kannada film

- Poster
- Directed by: Manjunatha Somakeshava Reddy (Mansore)
- Screenplay by: Veerendra Mallanna; Dayanand T. K.
- Story by: Mansore
- Produced by: Devaraj R.
- Starring: Yagna Shetty
- Cinematography: Satya Hegde
- Edited by: Nagendra K. Ujjani
- Music by: Ronada Bakkesh; Rahul Shivakumar
- Production company: D Creations
- Distributed by: KRG Studios
- Release date: 20 November 2020
- Running time: 127 minutes
- Country: India
- Language: Kannada

Act 1978 is a 2020 Kannada-language social thriller film directed by Manjunatha Somakeshava Reddy (Mansore) and starring Yagna Shetty. This was the first Kannada film to be released in theatres after the COVID-19 pandemic.

== Plot ==
Geetha, a pregnant widow, goes to a government office as part of her long and continuous ordeal to get money already sanctioned by the government, but kept on the backburner by officials of the concerned department. Tired of being asked for bribes, Geetha takes the violent route to get her due. The movie plays out like a game of chess. What seems to be a normal day of bureaucracy and corruption goes awry when she lands up with a bomb strapped to her stomach.

== Cast ==
- Yagna Shetty as Geetha
- B. Suresha as Sharanappa
- Pramod Shetty as ACP Ram Gopal
- Achyuth Kumar as Doreswamy, Home Minister
- H. G. Dattatreya as Advocate General Venkatachalaiah
- Shruti as Kanika Mehta, Chairperson of the Karnataka State Human Rights Commission
- Sudha Belawadi as Chief secretary Sabiha Bhanu
- Avinash as Chief Minister of Karnataka
- Sanchari Vijay as NSG Commando Chief Bheemeshwar Pandey
- Krishna Hebbale as Guruswamy, Branch Manager
- Shobaraj as Sub-inspector Karunakar
- Ashwin Hassan as constable
- Bala Rajwadi as Commissioner of Police Shankar Narayan
- RJ Nethra as Rohini, Central Crime Branch (CCB) officer
- Ravi Bhat as IGP Avinash Manphade
- Raghu Shivamogga as Benjamin
- P. D. Sathish Chandra as Aravinda Nadiger
- Deepa Ravishankar
- Sharanya as Suhasini
- Sathya Ummatthal
- Nanda Kumar as Ashok Dalavayi, Chief Accountant
- Kiran Naik as Govinda, peon
- Naresh Bhat as Lokesh, clerk
- Aravind Kuplikar

== Awards and nominations ==
Year	Award	Category	Recipient	Result	Ref.
2021	2nd Chandanavana Film Critics Academy Awards	Best Film	Devaraj R	Nominated	
2021	2nd Chandanavana Film Critics Academy Awards	Best Director	Mansore	Won	
2021	2nd Chandanavana Film Critics Academy Awards	Best Actress	Yagna Shetty	Nominated	
2021	2nd Chandanavana Film Critics Academy Awards	Best Screenplay	Mansore; TK Dayanand	Nominated	
2021	2nd Chandanavana Film Critics Academy Awards	Best Dialogue	TK Dayanand; Veeru Malanna	Nominated	
2021	2nd Chandanavana Film Critics Academy Awards	Best Lyrics	Jayanth Kaikini ("Teladu Mugile")	Nominated	
2021	2nd Chandanavana Film Critics Academy Awards	Best Editor	Nagendra K Ujjani	Nominated	
2021	2nd Chandanavana Film Critics Academy Awards	Best Art Director	Santhosh Panchal	Nominated	
2021	9th South Indian International Movie Awards.	Best Film	D Creations	Nominated	
2021	9th South Indian International Movie Awards.	Best Director	Mansore	Nominated	
2021	9th South Indian International Movie Awards.	Best Cinematographer	Satya Hegde	Nominated	
2021	9th South Indian International Movie Awards.	Best Actress	Yagna Shetty	Nominated	
2021	9th South Indian International Movie Awards.	Best Supporting Actor	B. Suresha	Won	
2022	67th Filmfare Awards South	Best Film	Devaraj R	Won	
2022	67th Filmfare Awards South	Best Director	Mansore	Nominated	
2022	67th Filmfare Awards South	Best Actress	Yagna Shetty	Won	
2022	67th Filmfare Awards South	Best Supporting Actor	B. Suresha	Won	
2022	67th Filmfare Awards South	Best Lyricist	Jayanth Kaikini for "Teladu Mugile")	Won	
2022	67th Filmfare Awards South	Best Playback Singer – Male	Kadabarege Muniraju for "Teladu Mugilu"	Nominated	
2020	2020 Karnataka State Film Awards	Best Editor	Nagendra K Ujjaini	Won	
