= Shreesha Kuduvalli =

Indian Cinematographer

Shreesha Kuduvalli is an Indian cinematographer in Sandalwood, who has worked in films like Yajamana, Rider, Geetha, and Rathnan Prapancha.

== Early life ==
Shreesha Kuduvalli was born on 20 May 1985 to Manjunath Kuduvalli and Shashimukhi in Shimoga, Karnataka.

Shreesha Kuduvalli started to work as an assistant cinematographer in 2004, and debuted, as an independent cinematographer, in 2013, with Topiwala.

== Filmography ==
Year	Film	Notes	Ref.
2010	Simply Kailawesome	Short film	
2013	Sulle Sathya	Short film	
2013	Topiwala	Debut	
2014	Bahaddur		
2014	Bharjari		
2015	Khushi Khushiyagi		
2016	Badmaash		
2017	Happy New Year		
2019	Yajamana		
2019	Geetha		
2021	Rathnan Prapancha	Filmfare Award for Best Cinematographer - South	
2021	Rider		
2022	Family Pack		
2023	Raghavendra Stores		
2024	Yuva		

== Awards ==
Kuduvalli's work for Rathnan Prapancha won Filmfare Award for Best Cinematographer – South
