= Harivu =

- Theatrical release poster
- Directed by: Mansore
- Written by: Mansore
- Screenplay by: H. A. Anilkumar
- Produced by: Avinash U. Shetty
- Starring: Sanchari Vijay; Shveta Desai; Aravind Kuplikar; Madhushree; Master Shoib; M.C. Anand; Chethan; Sheshan M.P. Prasanna Shetty
- Cinematography: Anand Sundaresha
- Edited by: Avinash U. Shetty
- Music by: Charan Raj
- Production company: Om Studios
- Release date: 2014
- Running time: 113 minutes
- Country: India
- Language: Kannada

Harivu (transl. The Flow) is a 2014 Indian Kannada language movie written and directed by debutant Manjunatha Somakeshava Reddy (S Manjunath / Mansore). A real life incident documented in a popular Kannada news paper written by Dr. Asha Benakappa gave thoughts for making this movie.

Inspired by a true incident that took place in a Government hospital in Bengaluru in the recent years, Harivu speaks volumes about the relation between urbanization and alienation.

Harivu has won 62nd National Award for "Best Kannada Film" from Directorate of Film Festivals. The movie has won the best movie Karnataka state award for the year 2014 under "Best Production & Direction" category.

== Plot ==
The story is based on a real-life incident. A farmer from north Karnataka brings his ailing son to Bangalore for treatment but the son dies. The farmer then faces a dilemma on how to take the body to his hometown.

== Awards ==
- The movie has won the best Kannada Film at 62nd National Film Awards for 2014 announced on 24 March 2015
- The movie has won the best movie Karnataka state award for the year 2014 under "Best Production & Direction" category.

== Screening ==
- The movie has been screened in 7th Bengaluru International Film Festival 2014. It was also selected in the Kannada Competition category.
- Screened in Delhi International Film Festival 2014.
