= Birbal Trilogy =

2019 Indian crime thriller film

- Theatrical release poster
- Directed by: M. G. Srinivas
- Written by: Prasanna VM (dialogues)
- Screenplay by: M. G. Srinivas
- Produced by: T. R. Chandrashekar
- Starring: M. G. Srinivas; Rukmini Vasanth
- Cinematography: Bharat Parasuram
- Edited by: Srikanth Shroff
- Music by: Saurabh-Vaibhav; Kalacharan
- Production company: Crystal Park Cinemas
- Distributed by: Crystal Park Cinemas; BKG Films
- Release date: 18 January 2019
- Running time: 149 minutes
- Country: India
- Language: Kannada

Birbal Trilogy Case 1: Finding Vajramuni (or simply Birbal) is a 2019 Indian Kannada-language crime thriller film co-written and directed by M. G. Srinivas. The film is the first installment of the planned Birbal Trilogy. It also marked the third character-based trilogy in Kannada cinema, after CID 999 and Sangliyana. It is also the first installment in a cinematic universe followed by Ghost in which M. G. Srinivas reprises his role.

Rukmini Vasanth made her debut as a lead actress. The film introduced an 8D song for the first time in Kannada cinema; it was also the first Kannada film to use the scribble effect. Its sequels are titled Birbal 2: Avrn bitt, Ivrn bitt, Ivryaru? and Birbal Trilogy Case 3: Turremane. Although Birbal 2 entered production in 2024, there has been no update on the third film.

The movie was praised for employing the Rashomon effect in its story narration technique. The movie is based on the 2017 Korean movie New Trial. The Telugu remake of the film Thimmarusu released on 30 July 2021.

== Plot ==
In Bangalore, Mahesh, an intelligent lawyer working for Hegde, a law firm head, is assigned to investigate the case of Vishnu, who is suspected of killing Ramdas, a taxi driver and a police informer 8 years ago. Mahesh learns that Vishnu is released from prison, where he along with his girlfriend Jahnvi and Shastry visit him at his village. Vishnu says that he was returning from work that night and gets injured in an accident, where he found Ramdas lying dead in the taxi and called the police, but the cops led by Inspector Raghavan, forces Vishnu to take blame for Ramdas' death after finding a knife in his scooter.

Mahesh begins his investigation, where he learns that the bar owner (where Vishnu is actually working) had tried to molest his friend Sheela, but Vishnu saved her and sent her away from the city. Through Sheela, Mahesh and Vishnu learn about an article describing the murder which was published 9 months ago, after Vishnu's imprisonment. They meet a retired police officer and learn that Suri, a call center employee, was behind Ramdas's death. Mahesh, Vishnu and Shastry capture Suri, who reveals that Raghavan used to make Suri and other young men commit robberies. Suri tried to force Ramdas to give money, but he accidentally stabbed Ramdas and escaped.

Fearing that his illegal activity would be exposed, Raghavan framed Vishnu and had him imprisoned, where he also makes Suri to pretend that he is mentally unstable. Vishnu tells Mahesh to present Suri in the court, but Mahesh refuses as the court already declared Suri as a mentally ill person and begins to find more clues. Later, Mahesh learns that the truck driver was at the murder spot, where he learns from a truck driver that a boy named Amoghavarsha took a lift in order to escape as he witnessed Ramdas' death. Mahesh finds Amoghavarsha and learns that he was returning home from a bar where he witnessed Ramdas' death and recorded it in his camera.

Later, Raghavan arrests Amoghavarsha for harassing the girl, which leads Mahesh to discover that Jahnavi was bribed by Raghavan to spy on Mahesh during his investigation. In the court, Mahesh manages to prove Vishnu's innocence and Raghavan is suspended. Later, Mahesh finds from the video that another person was present and behind Ramdas' death, where he traces the killer's bike and learns that the bike owner Narayanappa is a constable, who died from a stroke. Meanwhile, Raghavan kidnaps a person where Vishnu witness this and tries to kill Raghavan, but Mahesh stops him and Raghavan is arrested.

Mahesh takes a number from which Narayanappa received blackmail calls, where he devises a plan and manages to identify the killer, who is revealed to be a retired inspector named Vajramuni. Mahesh reveals himself as Ramdas's son and also knows that Vishnu was not present at the time of his father's death. With Shastry's help, Mahesh joined Hegde's law firm and secretly opened Vishnu's case. Mahesh had learnt about a memory card which revealed that Vajramuni had committed gruesome murders of various business persons' rival in the form of police encounters, where Ramdas learns about this from a grave caretaker. Fearing that he would be exposed, Vajramuni told Narayanappa to silence Ramdas. After the conclusion, Vajramuni gets arrested and sentenced to prison.

== Cast ==
- M. G. Srinivas as Mahesh Das, a lawyer
- Rukmini Vasanth as Jahnvi, Mahesh's girlfriend
- Vineeth Kumar as Vishnu
- Sujay Shastry as Shastry
- Suresh Heblikar as Hegde, a law firm head
- Aruna Balraj as Sumitra, Vishnu's mother
- Ravi Bhat as Ramdas
- Madhusudhan Rao as Inspector Raghavan
- Krishna Hebbale as Parthasarathy, a public prosecutor
- Keerthi Baanu as Retired Inspector Vajramuni
- Kavitha Gowda as Sheela (cameo appearance)
- Prithvi Banavasi
- Thirumalesh
- Amoghavarsha as Amoghavarsha
- Sandeep Jain as Suri
- Vilas Kulkarni
- Vinay Bharadwaj
- Deepak Raj
- Raghavan Lakshman

== Music ==
The soundtrack and background score were composed by Saurabh Vaibhav and Kalacharan. It was released under the label of Crystal Music.

Birbal

Soundtrack album by Saurabh Vaibhav and Kalacharan
- Released: 2019
- Recorded: 2019
- Studio: Crystal Park Cinemas
- Genre: Feature film soundtrack
- Length: 6:51
- Label: Crystal Music

Saurabh Vaibhav and Kalacharan chronology
2018 (Sonu Ke Titu Ki Sweety)	Birbal (2019)	Old Monk (2022)

=== Track list ===
No.	Title	Lyrics	Music	Singer(s)	Length
1.	"Birbal Title Track"	Trilok Trivikram	Saurabh Vaibhav	Saurabh Gupta	2:44
2.	"Ragini Madam"	Ajith Hedge Boppanalli; MG.Srinivas	Kalacharan	Sanjith Hegde	4:06

=== Original soundtrack ===
No.	Title	Length
1.	"Birbal Theme"	0:45
2.	"Mahesh Das alias Birbal"	1:52
3.	"The Murderer"	2:15
4.	"Butterfly Effect"	2:48
5.	"The Trap"	4:33
6.	"Raghava Theme"	2:47
7.	"The Attack"	1:13
8.	"Vajramuni Theme"	1:20
9.	"The Witness"	1:16
10.	"First Dimension Theme"	1:14
11.	"Second Dimension Theme"	1:40
12.	"Mahesh Das and Janhavi Love Theme"	2:01
13.	"The Vishnu's Love Theme"	2:57
14.	"The Plot"	0:53
15.	"Burqa Theme"	4:30
16.	"Vishnu vs Mahesh"	1:49
17.	"Amogha Arrest"	2:43
18.	"Freeze Scene"	3:33
19.	"The Final Reveal"	1:00
Total length:		42:18

== Release and reception ==
The director's efforts, an engaging screenplay, the cast's performance and the background score received praise from critics but was critiqued as having a slow-pace, being overwritten and being too long.

=== Critical reception ===
Sunayana Suresh of The Times of India rated the film three out of five stars and wrote, "The film has some interesting moments that stand out. A little tighter editing and screenplay would have elevated those. Yet, the film can be an interesting watch for those seeking something different". Karthik Keramalu of Film Companion wrote, "Birbal is 2019's first big Kannada release and I can say that the year has begun on a positive note. Chewing on Mahesh's findings was fun indeed!" Aravind Shwetha of The News Minute wrote, "The film lives up to the expectations mostly but also suffers from slow pacing."

Shyam Prasad S. of Bangalore Mirror rated the film two-and-a-half out of five stars and wrote, "Birbal has the looks and feel of a well-made film. If you have enough time on your hands and are adept at binge-watching online crime dramas, you may actually end up liking this film." Shashiprasad SM of Deccan Chronicle wrote, "The most crucial aspect for a thriller of any nature on celluloid is to keep the audience engaged for an edge-of-the-seat experience. Unfortunately, Birbal lacks this momentum. But for a couple of moments, the audience has a laborious time as they become curious about who the actual killer is."

== Home media ==
The movie was released on online platform Amazon Prime on 20 April 2020.
