= Old Monk (film) =

- Theatrical release poster
- Directed by: M. G. Srinivas
- Written by: Prasanna VM (dialogues)
- Screenplay by: Santosh Nandakumar; Prasanna VM; M. G. Srinivas
- Story by: M. G. Srinivas
- Produced by: Pradeep Sharma; Srujan Yarabolu; M. G. Srinivas; Saurabh-Vaibhav
- Starring: M. G. Srinivas; Aditi Prabhudeva
- Cinematography: Bharat Parasuram
- Edited by: Deepu S. Kumar
- Music by: Saurabh-Vaibhav
- Production company: Siddi Enterprises
- Release date: 25 February 2022
- Running time: 130 minutes
- Country: India
- Language: Kannada

Old Monk is a 2022 Indian Kannada-language romantic comedy film written and directed by M. G. Srinivas. The film features MG Srinivas, Aditi Prabhudeva in lead role. The film's title was inspired from the popular alcohol beverage brand, but it also means "Hale Sanyasi" in Kannada. Veteran actor Rajesh, made a special cameo appearance in the film. The film was released on 25 February 2022 simultaneously in the Kannada and Telugu languages.

Critics praised the direction, comedy, writing, dialogue and performance of the film. Music Director duo Saurabh and Vaibhav collaborate a second time with Srini after Birbal, and are one of the producers of the movie.

== Plot ==
Narada is cursed and banished to earth by Lord Krishna after he creates a quarrel between Krishna and Rukmini. The only way he can redeem himself is by marrying someone he loves on the earth. Now, Narada, christened as Appanna, is born into a family that only believes in arranged marriage and he has no chance of finding love with his father playing the villain. When he does find an interest, there are many hurdles.

== Cast ==
- MG Srinivas as Appanna and Narada
- Aditi Prabhudeva as Abhigna
- S. Narayan as Narayan, Appanna's father
- Sujay Shastry as Ranveer Singh
- Sudev Nair as Shashank Radhakrishna
- Aruna Balraj as Aruna, Appanna's mother
- Sihi Kahi Chandru as Abhigna's father
- Ashok Hegde as Radhakrishna, ex-minister
- Bangalore Nagesh
- Rajesh as LIC Shyama Raya, Guest appearance
- Sunil Raoh as Krishna, extended cameo appearance
- Meghashree as Rukmini
- P. D. Sathish Chandra as Time

== Soundtrack ==
Old Monk

Soundtrack album by Saurabh-Vaibhav
- Released: 2022
- Recorded: 2021
- Genre: Feature film soundtrack
- Length: 10:11
- Label: Anand Audio
- Producer: Saurabh-Vaibhav

Saurabh-Vaibhav chronology
Birbal (2019)	Old Monk (2022)

All songs were composed by Saurabh Vaibhav, and released under the label of Anand Audio. In "Old is Goldu", a song penned and sung by Gubbi, a tribute was paid to famous cult movies, through a photoshopped poster.

=== Track list ===
No.	Title	Lyrics	Singer(s)	Length
1.	"Giccha Gilli Gilli"	Mudakanna Moraba	Mudakanna Moraba	3:08
2.	"Old is Goldu"	Gubbi	Gubbi	2:01
3.	"Color Color Chitte"	Nagarjun Sharma	Saurabh Gupta	2:20
4.	"I.A.S Andre"	Srini, Prasanna VM	Vishak Naagalapura	2:42
Total length:				10:11

== Release ==
The film's release was postponed several times due the COVID-19 pandemic.

Director Srini announced the new release date for the film based on the government's decisions on post-pandamic occupation, and to avoid the release dates of other films. The film was released on 25 February 2022 simultaneously in the Kannada and Telugu languages.
