= M. G. Srinivas =

Indian actor and film director

M. G. Srinivas (Srini)
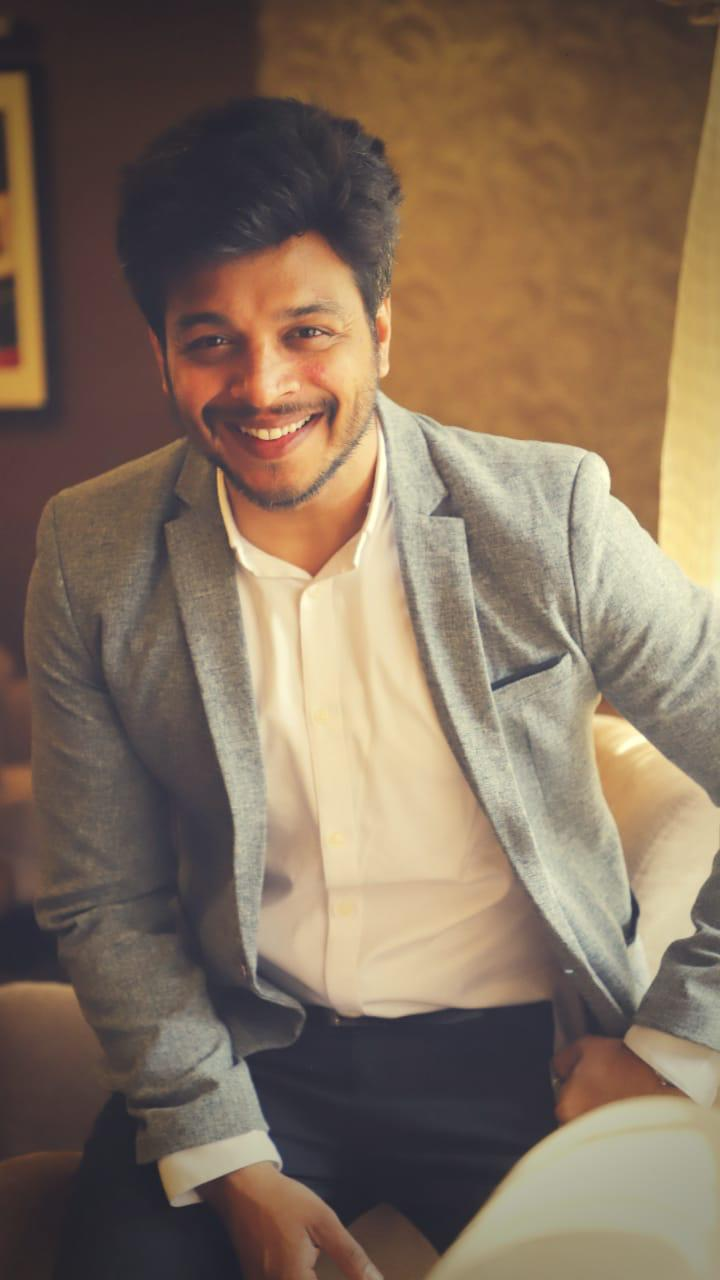

Personal details
- Born: Madihalli Gopalakrishna Srinivas; 9 July 1984 (age 42) Hassan, Karnataka, India
- Spouse: Shruti. I. L (m. 2019)
- Education: Seshadripuram College
- Occupation: Actor, director, screenwriter

M. G. Srinivas (Srini) is an Indian actor, film director and screenwriter who works in Kannada cinema. He made his debut as a director in the Kannada film industry with Topiwala (2013), which stars Upendra. He made his debut as a lead actor in Srinivasa Kalyana (2017).

Srini first became a radio jockey with his show on 93.5 RED FM, Blade Raja. He made short films, his first being Rules, which was screened at Australia's Bollywood and Beyond Film Festival. His next project, Simply Kailawesome, won him the Platinum Remi Award at the Houston Film Festival. The film is about the life and literary works of the Kannada writer T. P. Kailasam; it caught Upendra's attention and led to his first feature film, Topiwala, with Upendra in the lead.

== Personal life ==
M. G. Srinivas married Shruti IL, a journalist, on 30 June 2019 in Mysore.

== Film career ==
Alongside his radio career, Srinivas started making short films, his first being Rules, a slapstick comedy that was officially screened at the Australian film festival Bollywood & Beyond.

Following Rules, Srinivas trained at Abhinaya Taranga to learn acting. He made his second short film Simply Kailawesome, which was based on TP Kailasam's works, and played the lead role in the film. Simply Kailawesome won of the Platinum Award at Houston Film Festival, leading to a formal introduction to Kannada actor Upendra. Srinivas went on to direct Topiwala for Upendra.

He next directed the romantic comedy Srinivasa Kalyana, which Bharat Jain produced under Mars Films. This movie is Srinivas' commercial debut as a lead actor. Srinivas was first seen as an actor in the Sudeep-directed flick Just Maath Maathalli (2010), in which Srinivas played as Ramya's brother. Srinivasa Kalyana opened to positive reviews across the state. Deccan Chronicle gave the movie a 3/5 and praised the movie for its light-hearted comedy and youthful charm. Times of India rated the film a 3.5/5 and praised the sassy touch to this candy-floss romance.

His next venture was the crime thriller Birbal Trilogy, which consists of Case 1: Finding Vajramuni, Case 2: Avrn bitt, Ivrn bitt, Ivryaru?, and Case 3: Turremane. Birbal Trilogy Case 1: Finding Vajramuni was released in January 2019, and stars Srinivas and Rukmini Vasanth in the lead roles.

Srinivas completed the film Old Monk, which stars Srinivas and Aditi Prabhudeva in the lead roles. The film's title was inspired by an alcoholic beverage brand and means "Hale Sanyasi" in Kannada. Veteran actor Rajesh, made a special cameo appearance in the film. The film was released on 25 February 2022. Critics praised the direction, comedy, writing, dialogue and performance of the film. The music-director duo Saurabh and Vaibhav worked a second time with Srinivas after Birbal, and are one of the producers of the movie.

Srinivas' next film was Ghost, which is an Indian, Kannada-language, action-heist thriller film that was written and directed by Srini, and produced by Sandesh Nagraj under Sandesh Productions. The film stars Shiva Rajkumar, Prashant Narayanan, Jayaram, Anupam Kher, and Archana Jois; it was officially announced in 2022 under the Sandesh Nagraj Productions Sandalwood and was released theatrically on 19 October 2023, coinciding with Dussehra. It is the second installment of a cinematic universe following Birbal Trilogy Case 1: Finding Vajramuni in which Srinivas reprises his role as Mahesh Das.

== Awards ==
Year	Category	Event name	Work	Award Name	Result
2011	Best Short Film	Houston International Film Festival	Simply Kailawesome	Platinum Remy award	Won
2022	Rising Star	Chittara Star Awards	Birbal Trilogy	Chittara Rising star award	Won
2023	Most Entertaining star of the year	Chithra Santhe Awards	Old Monk	Chithra Santhe Most Entertaining star of the year	Won
2024	Best Director – Critics	Chithra Santhe Awards	Ghost	Chithra Santhe Best Director – Critics	Won
2024	Best Director	South Indian International Movie Awards	Ghost	Best Director	Nominated
2024	Best Director	International Indian Film Academy Awards	Ghost	Best Director	Nominated

== Filmography ==
=== As an actor ===
Year	Film	Role	Notes	Ref.
2010	Just Maath Maathalli	Tanu's brother		
2010	Chirru	Chirru's friend	Credited as Srini Dilip	
2010	Simply Kailawesome	T. P. Kailasam	Short film	
2017	Srinivasa Kalyana	Srinivas aka Lakshmi Kantha Baalu		
2019	Birbal Trilogy	Mahesh Das		
2019	Ranganayaki	Krishna Murthy		
2021	Old Monk	Appanna / Narada		
2023	Ghost	Mahesh Das		
TBA	Birbal Trilogy Case 2: Avrn bitt, Ivrn bitt, Ivryaru? †	Mahesh Das	Filming	

=== As a director ===
Year	Film	Credit as		Notes	Ref.
Year	Film	Director	Writer	Notes	Ref.
2010	Simply Kailawesome	Yes	Yes	Short film	
2013	Topiwala	Yes	No		
2017	Srinivasa Kalyana	Yes	Yes		
2019	Birbal Trilogy	Yes	Yes		
2021	Old Monk	Yes	Yes	Also co-produced the film	
2023	Ghost	Yes	Yes		
TBA	Birbal 2 †	Yes	Yes	Filming	
TBA	A for Anand †	Yes	No	Announced	
TBA	Dalavayi †	Yes	No	Announced	
TBA	Ghost 2 †	Yes	No	Announced	

== Business ventures ==
In 2024, Srini founded AI Samhitha, a company specializing in voice cloning technology.
