= Neeli (TV series) =

Indian-Tamil language horror-supernatural soap opera

- Genre: Soap opera Supernatural
- Created by: Sri Barati Associate
- Directed by: C. Jerrold
- Starring: Chavi Sharma; Navin Vetri; Nandhini; Niranjani; Kavitha Gowda; Nikitha Murali; Devipriya; Tanisha Kuppanda
- Theme music composer: Johnson
- Country of origin: India
- Original language: Tamil
- No. of episodes: 260

Production
- Producer: Jeetu Kamal
- Editor: A.Muthu Krishnan
- Camera setup: Multi-camera
- Running time: approx. 20–22 minutes per episode
- Production company: JKP Groups

Original release
- Network: Vijay TV
- Release: 19 December 2016 – 22 December 2017

Neeli is a 2016—2017 Indian Tamil-language soap opera starring Chavi, Naveen, Niranjani, Nikitha Murali and Kavitha Gowda. It aired on Vijay TV. The show debuted on 19 December 2016 and ended with 260 episodes. The show is an adaptation of the Kannada Suvarna TV serial Neeli. It also airs in Sri Lanka Tamil channel on Shakthi TV from 8 May 2017.

The series is said to reveal that a dead mother's ghost will protect her baby Abi who always shares her emotions with her doll Neeli.

== Synopsis ==
Abhirami loses her mother Divya at a young age and is devastated when her father remarries. Rekha is trying to separate Abi from her husband. It is then that Divya, like an angel, protects Abhi from the troubles of life. Anjali enters the picture. As she is an amnesiac, she enters the family. Anjali and Abhi soon bond. Divya appears in front of Anjali and both try to find the miseries in Divya's death. In that process Divya repeatedly helps Anjali indirectly and tries to make Anjali to fall for Surya. Some incidents in the home make others hate Anjali. A function named Thalikorthal comes and everyone conceals the place of function from Anjali. Divya appears to Surya and helps Anjali reach the place. When Anjali enters the Mangalsutra falls from Rekha's neck. Iyer of the temple suggests the Mangalsutra should be tied again by him after doing some rituals. Meanwhile Divya's father comes to meet Rekha, and realises that Divya's soul is doing all such things with the help of Anjali. So he decides to make her soul achieve peace. So they all go to meet a Sidhar. There Sidhar meets Rekha and tells her to do some rituals at different temples of all Devis. So Rekha leaves the home to visit the temples. Divya's father asks a promise from Divya not to make any more problems. Rekha performs some difficult rituals in temples which includes wearing thorn shoes, handles fire, etc. So Surya feels bad for her and understands she is doing so much for him and for his welfare and good life. Overfelt Surya decides to meet the same Sidhar to ask for an alternative. Sidhar tells him to make Divya calm which is the only way to make all problems solve. Sidhar helps him to see Divya and Divya says she wants to spend some time with him and Abi. She says she wants to spend a week with Abi by entering Anjali's body. Surya initially refuses but Abi also wants to spend time with her parents. Surya seeks Anjali's help but she refuses to accompany them. After discussing with Divya, Anjali agrees to spend a week with them. They tell their housemates fake reasons and leave home. Without the knowledge of Rekha, they visit a motel in ECR.

== Cast ==
=== Main ===
- Chavi Sharma as Abhirami: Surya and Divya's daughter
- Navin Vetri as Surya: Abhi's father
- Nandhini as Anjali: Abhi's caretaker
- Niranjani as Divya: Abhi's mother; Surya's first wife
- Nikitha Murali as Vedhika
- Kavitha Gowda as Rekha: Surya's second wife; Abhi's stepmother
- Devipriya as Kamatchi: Anjali's caretaker; episodes 222–260
- Tanisha Kuppanda as Thulasi (a witch)
- Doll as Neeli (a ghost)

=== Recurring ===
- Vikash Sampath as Dheena: Rekha's younger brother
- Jeevitha
- Mani KL as Chandru
- R. Aravindraj as Divya's father
- Rekha Krishnappa as Devayani: Rekha's elder sister
- S.Kavitha as Dr Lakshmi
- Kamal as Shakthi
- Deepika as Sathiya wife (episodes 204–206)
- Ashwin Kumar as Sathiya (episodes 203–206)

== Awards and nominations ==
Year	Award	Category	Recipient	Role	Result
2017	Vijay Television Awards	Favourite Negative Role	Kavitha	Rekha	Won
2017	Vijay Television Awards	Best Child Actor	Chavi	Abirami	Won
2017	Vijay Television Awards	Favourite Comedian Fiction	Mani KL	Chandru	Nominated
