= Ghost (2023 film) =

2023 Indian Kannada-language film

- Theatrical release poster
- Directed by: M. G. Srinivas
- Dialogues by: Prasanna V. M.; Maasti
- Story by: M. G. Srinivas
- Produced by: Sandesh Nagaraj
- Starring: Shiva Rajkumar; Jayaram; Anupam Kher; Prashant Narayanan; Archana Jois
- Cinematography: Mahendra Simha
- Edited by: Deepu S. Kumar
- Music by: Arjun Janya
- Production company: Sandesh Productions
- Release date: 19 October 2023
- Running time: 132 minutes
- Country: India
- Language: Kannada
- Budget: ₹15 crore
- Box office: ₹31 crore

Ghost is a 2023 Indian Kannada-language action heist thriller film directed by M. G. Srinivas and produced by Sandesh Nagaraj under Sandesh Production. The film stars Shiva Rajkumar, Jayaram, Anupam Kher, Prashant Narayanan, and Archana Jois. It is the second installment of a cinematic universe following Birbal Trilogy in which M. G. Srinivas had appeared. In the film, an anonymous gangster called "Big Daddy" hijacks a prison to steal hidden gold bars recovered during a CBI raid, but ACP Chengappa arrives to stop Big Daddy from executing his plans.

Ghost was released theatrically on 19 October 2023, during Dasara weekend, to positive reviews from critics and became a box office success. A sequel titled Ghost 2 is planned.

== Plot ==
An anonymous person and his gang hijack the central prison in Karnataka, where they capture prisoners, prison officials and Vamana Srinivasan, ex-CBI officer, and hold them as hostages. ACP Chengappa is assigned to solve the hostage issue. A cat-and-mouse game ensues between the anonymous person and Chengappa during which the person is revealed as Dalavayi Muddanna alias "Big Daddy", an infamous crime boss.

Chengappa learns that Dalavayi and his gang hijacked the prison to steal gold bars. It is revealed that Vamana had discovered the gold bars during a CBI raid and had hidden it in the prison, due to public attention of a controversial gold scam. Vamana and Thomas, the prison officer, decided to retrieve the gold by implementing privatisation of the prison in order to distract the public, but Prabhu, one of Vamana's officers, learnt about their plan and decided to expose their secrets. Vamana found out about Prabhu and killed him, making it look like a suicide. Vamana also killed Geetha, Prabhu's disabled wife, after she learnt about his plan.

Dalavayi and his team find the gold in the prison's newly constructed library. Vamana initiates his next plan of releasing dangerous prisoners to kill Dalavayi and his team. However, they are revealed to be Dalavayi's previous henchmen. Chengappa learns about Dalavayi and is later revealed that he and his officers had killed Dalavayi in a car accident previously. Chengappa suspects that the person who hijacked the prison as Dalavayi is an imposter. Chengappa confirms the same and reveals the information to the henchmen.

The henchmen attacks the imposter Dalavayi, but he manages to defeat them. The imposter Dalavayi initiates his escape plan by sending his henchmen to travel with the prisoners in the bus, while he transfers the real gold through remote control mini boats and keep the fake gold in the bus. He eventually escapes through a secret route, while Chengappa is unable to identify Dalavayi's henchmen. A few months later, Home Minister Vijayalakshmi assigns "Pithamaha", a spy agency headed by A. N. Rao, to solve the case due to pressure from the government.

It is later revealed that the imposter Dalavayi is actually Anand Rao, Rao's son and Prabhu's elder brother. Anand and Rao learnt about Vamana's plan and his involvement in Prabhu and Geetha's deaths, where they decided to clear Prabhu's name and expose Vamana. Anand decided to pose as Dalavayi by wearing a prosthetic mask and hijacked the prison. Anand finally exposes Vamana and gets him and Thomas arrested. While paying respects to Prabhu and Geetha, Anand gets a call from Dalavayi's son, who demands him to return the gold in exchange for rescuing his team members. Anand and Rao set out to confront Dalavayi's son.

== Cast ==
- Shiva Rajkumar as Dalavayi Muddanna alias "Big Daddy" and Anand Rao (dual role)
- Jayaram as ACP Chengappa
- Anupam Kher as A. N. Rao, Anand's father
- Prashant Narayanan as ex-CBI chief Vamana Srinivasan
- Archana Jois as Lakshmi, a news reporter
- Satya Prakash as Thomas
- Abhijith as CM Subhash Rao Channabasappa
- Vijayalakshmi Singh as Home Minister Vijayalakshmi
- M. Kamaraj as prisoner and aide of Dalavayi
- M. G. Srinivas as Mahesh Das

== Music ==
Ghost

Soundtrack album by Arjun Janya
- Released: 17 November 2023
- Recorded: 2022–2023
- Genre: Feature film soundtrack
- Length: 11:36
- Language: Kannada
- Label: T-Series

Arjun Janya chronology
Raja Marthanda (2024)	Ghost (2024)	Upadhyaksha (2024)
External audio
- Ghost – Kannada Audio Jukebox on YouTube

The music of the film was composed by Arjun Janya. The film's songs referred to as OGMs (Original Gangster Music) garnered immense praise for their innovative approach with particular attention given to the first OGM. This distinctive composition seamlessly integrated lines from various languages into one song, earning resounding applause from audiences. The first single titled "OGM" was released on 22 September 2023. The Second OGM was released on 17 October 2023, while the third OGM was released on 1 November 2023.

Track listing
No.	Title	Lyrics	Singer(s)	Length
1.	"OGM"	MC Chetan, Rajesh, Chiranjeevi	MC Chetan, Jithin Raaj, Aishwarya Rangarajan	2:45
2.	"Fanthem"	Prasanna VM	Agastya Raag, Kalyan Manjunath, Yashraj Solomon, Karthik Sambhapur, Vinay KN, Sathwik Sathish	2:35
3.	"Second OGM"	Nishan Rai	Nishan Rai	2:03
4.	"Third OGM"	Nishan Rai	Nishan Rai	2:02
5.	"He Is Ghost"	Nishan Rai	Sathyam Keys	2:10
Total length:				11:36

== Release ==
The first look was released on 12 July 2022, coinciding with the actor's birthday, while a motion poster was released on 2 January 2023. The trailer was released on 1 October 2023. The film was released on 19 October 2023, coinciding with Dasara.

=== Home media ===
The satellite and digital rights were acquired by Zee Kannada and ZEE5. On the platform, the film was premiered on 17 November 2023.

== Reception ==
Ghost received positive reviews from critics.

=== Critical response ===
A. Sharadhaa of The New Indian Express gave 4/5 stars and wrote "Ghost offers thrilling moments, with Shivarajkumar's exceptional performance, along with the rest of the cast, elevating the viewing experience." Prathibha Joy of OTTplay gave 3.5/5 stars and wrote "Ghost is quite the thrilling two-hour ride and could just be the Dasara winner Kannada cinema has been looking for."

S. Sridevi of The Times of India gave 3/5 stars and wrote "Ghost is a one-of-its-kind heist thriller for the Kannada audience, packed with plenty of mass scenes catered and assembled particularly for Shivarajkumar’s fans." Anjali Belgaumkar of The Indian Express gave 3.5/5 stars and wrote "Directed by MG Srinivas, the Shivarajkumar movie will keep you on the edge of your seat." Anindita Mukherjee of India Today gave 2.5/5 stars and wrote "‘Ghost’ is a great watch for all those who love punches, fights and tough dialogues."

Vivek M. V of The Hindu wrote "Ghost is a film that deserves appreciation for its attempt; not so much for its result." Subha. J. Rao of Film Companion wrote "Director MG Srinivas needed to invest better in the writing and focus on the ‘show, don’t tell’ philosophy."

=== Box office ===
Ghost achieved notable success at the box office by grossing ₹30.28 crore against a budget of ₹15 crore within a span of four weeks.
