= T. Paramasiva Iyer =

Indian scholar

- Born: 1863; Bangalore, British India
- Died: 1943 (aged 79–80)
- Education: Literature, law
- Occupation(s): Vedic scholar, writer, judge

Justice Thyagaraja Paramasiva Iyer (1863–1943) was an Indian vedic scholar, writer and a District and Sessions Judge of Bangalore during the period of Maharaja Chamarajendra Wadiyar X and later a Chief Justice of the Mysore High Court. He was the brother of Indian judge and theosophist T. Sadasiva Iyer and father of reputed Kannada poet T. P. Kailasam. He had expert knowledge in various physical sciences viz. Geology, Mining, Organic Chemistry, Agriculture, Astronomy. He was well versed in classical Greek and Latin literature and made comparative studies in Vedic Philology. He was the son-in-law of Narayana Shastri, after whom the main road in Mysore was named. He was a student of Lord Baron Avebury.

== Books ==
- The Riks or Primeval Gleams of Light And Life
