= Simply Kailawesome =

- Film poster
- Directed by: M. G. Srinivas
- Produced by: S. V. Babu
- Starring: M. G. Srinivas; Chaya Singh
- Narrated by: Srinagar Kitty
- Cinematography: Shreesha Kuduvalli
- Edited by: Shri
- Music by: Bharath B. J.
- Release date: 2010
- Country: India
- Language: Kannada

Simply Kailawesome is a Kannada short film directed by M. G. Srinivas. The film was made on playwright T. P. Kailasam and revolves around conversations between Kailasam and female protagonists from four of his plays. While MG Srinivas played T. P. Kailasam, Chaya Singh played all the four female characters: Paatu from Tollugatti, Eeke from Gandaskathri, Venkamma from Home Rule and Sule from the play Sule. It is inspired by the classic play Typical Arathi, written by A S Murthy. The film opened to rave reviews from critics and gained instant recognition when it was selected by the Jury of the Prestigious Platinum Remi Award at the 44th Annual WorldFest-Houston International Film Festival.

== Plot ==
Simply Kailawesome is an ode to yesteryear legendary playwright T.P. Kailasam. It has a quirky take on the characters created by Kailasam in the past and how they start complaining to him as soon as he lands in the present, trying to find their current status.

Combining an auto-biographical tone with a fusion of thoughts within Kailasam's mind, the story of the short film is more of a congregation of his most famous female protagonists than a series of events. It also involves the playwright's own perspective about his first stint in drama, the way he picked his characters, his views on Anglo-Kannada and the events that inspired him to move away from traditional mythologies which was persistently found in most plays of the time.

== Cast ==
- MG Srinivas as T. P. Kailasam
- Chaya Singh as Paatu/Eeke/Venkamma/Sule
