= T. Sadasiva Iyer =

Indian judge

Diwan Bahadur Sir Thyagaraja Sadasiva Iyer
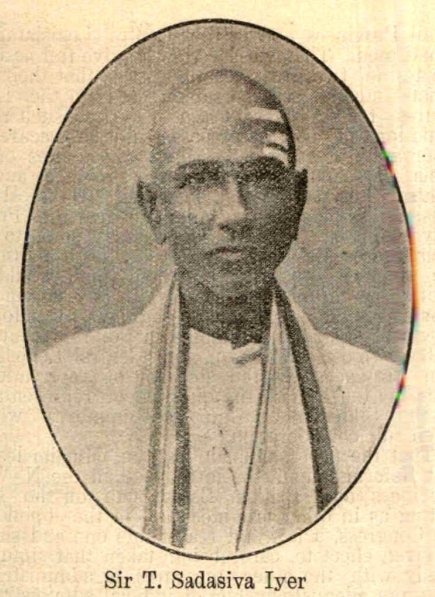

President, Hindu Religious and Charitable Endowments Department (HR & CE), Madras Presidency
- In office 1921–1927

Chief Justice of Travancore
- In office 1905–1910

Personal details
- Born: 23 June 1861 Kumbakonam, Madras Presidency
- Died: 1 December 1927 (aged 66) Madras
- Spouse: Mangalammal
- Occupation: Judge, bureaucrat
- Profession: Law

Sir Thyagaraja Sadasiva Iyer (23 June 1861 – 1 December 1927) was an Indian judge and theosophist who served as the Chief Justice of Travancore from 1905 to 1910. He was also the first President of the Hindu Religious and Charitable Endowments Department, Madras Presidency.

== Early life and education ==
Sadasiva was born in a Tamil Hindu family in Kumbakonam on 23 June 1861 to Thyagaraja, who was a daayadhi (cousin by paternal lineage) to Nobel Laureate C. V. Raman. He was educated at Kumbakonam and Madras and mastered in Hindu law. Sadasiva's younger brother was Justice T. Paramasiva Iyer, the father of the Kannada playwright T. P. Kailasam.

== Judicial career ==
Sadasiva started his judicial career as an apprentice to Raja T. Rama Rao before enrolling as a vakil in the Madras High Court. After joining service as District Munsiff of Madura in 1887 and District Judge [must be Munsif; he became District Judge much later] at Tinnevely, Sadasiva Iyer was made a Sub-Judge in 1905. In 1905, he was appointed Chief Judge of Travancore High Court and served till 1910, when he reverted to British service and was posted as District and Sessions Judge of Ganjam. In 1912, Sadasiva was appointed additional judge of the Madras High Court and served from 1912 till his retirement in 1921. In 1915 he was elected as Vice-President of the National Indian Association, Madras.

In 1921, he was appointed President of the Hindu Religious and Charitable Endowments Department (HR & CE), newly established by the Justice Party government of the Raja of Panagal. He was made a Knight Bachelor in the King's Birthday Honours' List of 1921.

== Theosophical Society and Social Reform ==
Sadasiva was an active member of the Theosophical Society presiding over several meetings and serving as the General Secretary of its India Section from 1924-1925. In 1918, Annie Besant and the leaders of the Home Rule League established the Wood's College at Madanapalle as the first National University, Sadasiva Iyer was appointed as its Vice Chancellor and Rabindranath Tagore its Chancellor.

== Death ==
Sadasiva died at Madras on 1 December 1927 at the age of 66.

== Family ==
Sadasiva married his maternal cousin, Mangalammal. The couple had five sons (Viswanathan, Krishnamurthy, Thyagarajan, Swaminathan, and Ramachandran) and three daughters (Balamma, Syamala, and Parvati). His brother in law was Dewan Bahadur R. V. Srinivasa Aiyar.
