= Broche Varevaru Ra =

Brochevarevarura
- by Mysore Vasudevachar
- Genre: Carnatic
- Language: Telugu

Broche varevaru ra is a Classical Telugu composition by Mysore Vasudevachar in the Kamas Raga of Carnatic music.

External videos
- Brochevarevarura by M. S. Subbulakshmi
- Brochevarevarura by Mangalampalli Balamurali Krishna
- Brochevarevarura by G. N. Balasubramaniam
- Brochevarevarura by Maharajapuram Santhanam
- Brochevarevarura by S. P. Balasubrahmanyam and Vani Jayaram

== Lyrics and meaning ==
The transliteration and meaning in English are given below

Lyrical Section	Telugu	Transliteration	English Translation
Pallavi	బ్రోచేవారెవరురా నిను వినా రఘువరా నను^{1}నీ చరణాంబుజములఁ నే విడజాల కరుణాలవాల	Brōchēvārevarurā ninu vinā Raghuvarā nanu^{1}Nī caraṇāmbujamulanu nē viḍajāla karuṇālavālā	Apart from You, who is there to protect Me, O Best of the Raghu dynasty (Lord Rama) ? I cannot abandon Your lotus-like feet, O Repository of Mercy.
Anupallavi	ఓ చతురాననాది వ౦దిత నీకు పరాకేలనయ్య నీ చరితమునుఁ పొగడలేని నా చి౦తఁదీర్చి వరములిచ్చి వేగమె	Ō Chaturānanādi vandita nīku parākēlanayya Nī charitamunu pogadalēni nā Chinta dīrchi varamulicchi vēgame nanu^{2} (brōcēvāru)	O, to You who are praised by Chaturānana (the Four-Faced One, Lord Brahmā) and the others, why this hesitation, my Lord ? I, who am unable to praise Your history, remove my worries and grant me boons quickly. (save me, who...)
Charanam	సీతాపతే నాపై నీకభిమానము లేదా వాతాత్మజార్చితపాద నా మొరలను వినరాదా ఆతురముగఁ కరిరాజును బ్రోచిన వాసుదేవుడవు నీవుఁగదా నా పాతకమెల్లఁ పోగొట్టి గట్టిగఁ నా చేయిఁబట్టి విడువక నను	Sītāpatē nāpai nīkabhimānamu lēdā Vātātmajārchita pāda nā moralanu vinarādā Āturamugā karirājunu brōchina Vāsudēvuḍavu nīvugadā Nā pātakamella pōgoṭṭi gaṭṭigā nā chēyibaṭṭi viḍuvaka nanu^{2}	O Husband of Goddess Sita! Is there no love towards me in You ? O whose feet are worshipped by the Son of the Wind-God (Hanuman), will You not listen to earnest appeals ? Are you not indeed that Lord Vāsudeva who protected the king of elephants in distress ? After taking away all of my sins, tightly hold my hand, and don't let me go.

== See also ==
- Mysore Vasudevachar
- List of Carnatic composers
