= Saurabh-Vaibhav =

Indian playback Singer and Music Composer

- Saurabh Gupta; Vaibhav Singh
- Saurabh Vaibhav Photo before Music Mirchi Awards
- Citizenship: India
- Years active: 2008–present

Saurabh Gupta and Vaibhav Singh are Indian music directors and composers who have worked in Bollywood and in Kannada cinema. They have worked in the music and advertisement industry as music directors and creative heads.

== Career ==
They have composed music for Sonu Ke Titu Ki Sweety, Birbal Trilogy Case 1: Finding Vajramuni, Old Monk, and the short film Forever Whim.

Their work for commercials includes Panasonic, Flipkart, the T-Series single - Taleem (2017), and the web series Life Sahi Hai (2016).

== Awards ==
- Star Screen Award
- Listener's Choice Album of the Year for the film Sonu Ke Titu Ki Sweety, which included one of their songs
- 20th IIFA Awards
- 64th Filmfare Awards

== Discography ==
Year	Album	Song	Artist	Reference
2018	Sonu Ke Titu Ki Sweety soundtrack	"Sweety Slowly Slowly"	Mika Singh	
2022	"Khuda Khuda"		Shahid Mallya	

== Awards and nominations ==
Year	Award	Category	Work	Result	Reference
2018	11th Mirchi Music Awards	Listener's Choice Album of the Year	"Sweety Slowly Slowly"	Won	
