= Kavitha Gowda =

Indian actress

Kavitha
- Born: 26 July 1992 (age 34); Bangalore, Karnataka state
- Occupations: Actress, Dancer
- Years active: 2015 - present
- Known for: Lakshmi Baramma
- Spouse: Chandan Kumar (m. 2021)

Kavitha is an Indian film and television actress who predominantly works in Kannada and Tamil television series. She gained popularity in the Kannada television soap opera Lakshmi Baramma. She was appreciated for her debut in the Kannada films Srinivasa Kalyana and First Love.

== Career ==
Kavitha made her debut in acting with the popular Tamil television show Mahabharatham. Kavitha entered the Kannada television industry with Lakshmi Baramma, where she played the role of innocent village girl Lakshmi aka Lacchi aka Chinnu. After Kavitha's appearance in Lakshmi Baramma, she was recognized as "Chinnu", creating a buzz among the fans.

The actress has also acted in various Tamil soaps Neeli, Pandian stores and was recently seen in the popular soap Vidya Vinayaka which was aired in Zee Kannada. However, She left Pandian Stores and was replaced by Hema Rajkumar because she went to Bigg Boss Kannada 6.

She acted in the films Srinivasa Kalyana (2016) and First Love (2017).

She participated in the Bigg Boss Kannada season 6, and emerged as the Second Runner-up of the show.

She then participated in Thaka Dimi Tha Dancing Star, a dancing reality show on Colors Kannada but was eliminated in the semi-finale round.

== Filmography ==
=== Films ===
Year	Film	Role	Notes	Ref.
2016	Srinivasa Kalyana	Akshara		
2017	First Love			
2019	Gubbi Mele Brahmastra	Purple Priya		
2020	Birbal Trilogy	Sheela	Guest appearance	
2021	Govinda Govinda	Alamelu		
2021	Huttu Habbada Shubhashayagalu	Ashika		

=== Television ===
Year	Title	Role	Language	Channel	Notes
2013	Mahabharatham	Subangi	Tamil	Sun TV	
2013	Swathi Chinukulu	Unknown	Telugu	ETV	
2013 - 2016	Lakshmi Baramma	Lakshmi	Kannada	Colors Kannada	
2016 - 2017	Neeli	Rekha	Tamil	Star Vijay	
2017 - 2018	Vidhya Vinayaka	Vidhya	Kannada	Zee Kannada	
2018	Pandiyan Stores	Meenakshi (Meena)	Tamil	Star Vijay	Replaced by Hema Rajkumar
2018	Bigg Boss Kannada 6	Contestant	Kannada	Colors Kannada	2nd Runner Up
2019	Thakadimitha	Contestant	Kannada	Colors Kannada	
2021	Cookku with Kirikku	Contestant	Kannada	Star Suvarna	Finalist
2021	Dance Dance	Contestant	Kannada	Star Suvarna	Finalist
2022	Anbe Sivam	Anbu selvi	Tamil	Zee Tamil	
2026–Present	Jagadhatri	Koushiki	Kannada	Zee Kannada	
