= Srinivasa Kalyana =

2017 kannada film

- Film poster
- Directed by: M. G. Srinivas
- Written by: M. G. Srinivas
- Produced by: Raghu Thane; Bharat Jain
- Starring: M. G. Srinivas; Sujay Shastry; Kavitha Gowda; Nikhila Suman
- Cinematography: Ashwin Kadamboor
- Edited by: P. Shashidhar
- Music by: Raghu Thane; Midhun Mukundan
- Production company: Mars Films
- Release date: 24 February 2017

Srinivasa Kalyana (Kannada: ಶ್ರೀನಿವಾಸ ಕಲ್ಯಾಣ; English: Srinivas's Marriage) is a 2017 Kannada language romantic comedy-philosophical film written and directed by M. G. Srinivas, who also appears in the lead role, along with Sujay Shastry, Kavitha Gowda, Nikhila Suman, Achyuth Kumar and HG Dattatreya playing supporting roles. The movie was released on 24 February 2017 opened to positive reviews.

== Cast ==
- MG Srinivas as Srinivas aka Lakshmi Kantha Baalu
- Sujay Shastry as Benki Seena
- Kavitha Gowda as Akshara
- Nikhila Suman as Radha
- Achyuth Kumar
- H. G. Dattatreya
- Ram Manjjonaath
- Poornachandra Mysore

== Soundtrack ==
Srinivasa Kalyana

Soundtrack album by Midhun Mukundan
- Released: August 2016
- Genre: Feature film soundtrack
- Label: Jhankar Music

The soundtrack of the film was composed by Midhun Mukundan, Raghavendra Thane and remix for Kanasina was done by DJ Yash.

Track listing
No.	Title	Lyrics	Singer(s)	Length
1.	"Gapu Gapalli"	Prasanna VM	Midhun Mukundan
2.	"Bettadmele Srinivasu"	Chetan Kumar	Sooraj Santosh
3.	"Kanasina"	Jayant Kaikini	Deepak Doddera
4.	"Ringa Ringa"	Pradeep NR	Haricharan
5.	"Full Busy"	Yogaraj Bhat	Vijay Prakash
6.	"Weldingu"	Yogaraj Bhat	Vijay Prakash
7.	"Kanasina (Remix)"	Jayant Kaikini	Deepak Doddera
8.	"Srinivasa Kalyana Theme"		Shilpa Madhusudhan, Archana Ravi, Midhun Mukundan

== Critical reception ==
The film Srinivasa Kalyana garnered mixed to negative feedback from critics. The New Indian Express dismissed it as a stale and tedious story, recommending viewers avoid it. Vijaya Karnataka highlighted the shortcomings in the storyline, stating that the love story and character development lacked depth and failed to resonate. Deccan Chronicle pointed out the muddled and incomplete nature of the film’s romantic narratives, referring to them as "first, second, and third" love stories. Deccan Herald characterized it as a display of "Romeo’s escapades," but noted it offered little novelty or impact. The Times of India gave it a rating of 2.5 out of 5, conceding some entertainment value but criticizing the inconsistency in the script and dialogues.
