= T. P. Kailasam =

19–20th century Mysorean playwright in Kannada literature

T.P. Kailasam
- Born: 29 July 1884; Mysore, Kingdom of Mysore (now in Karnataka, India)
- Died: 1946; Bangalore, Kingdom of Mysore (now Bengaluru, Karnataka, India)
- Occupations: Playwright, Geologist
- Relatives: T. Paramasiva Iyer (father); T. Sadasiva Iyer (paternal uncle); C. V. Raman (paternal first cousin once removed); Narayana Shastri (maternal grandfather)
- Writing career
- Genres: Fiction, humour, comedy

Thyagaraja Paramasiva Kailasam (29 July 1884 – 1946), was an Indian playwright and prominent writer in the Kannada literature. Literary criticism in Kannada literature is said to have started for the first time by Kailasam in his works.

His contribution to Kannada theatrical comedy earned him the title Prahasana Prapitamaha (the great-grandfather of humorous plays). He was later often revered as "Kannada's One and Only Kailasam".

== Life ==
Kailasam was born in a Tamil Hindu family in Mysore, Kingdom of Mysore (now Karnataka). His father, T Paramasiva Iyer, was a revenue collector in the Government of Mysore who later became the Chief Justice of Mysore High Court. His father's brother, Sir T. Sadasiva Iyer, was a Chief Justice of Travancore High Court. Sir C.V. Raman is his father's cousin on the paternal side. His maternal grandfather was Narayana Shastri, after whom the main road in Mysore is named.

Kailasam received a good education. He was supported by Maharaja Krishnaraja Wadiyar IV to study geology at the Royal College of Science, London. His close friends and classmates included K. V. Iyer and V. Seetharamaiah. Kailasam repeated several courses to have an excuse to extend his stay in England. He spent seven years in school there to complete his fellowship, participating in theatre whenever possible.

Soon after his return, he joined the geology service in Mysore government. He became disillusioned with a government job and quit to write plays and live a bohemian life. His father's failed ambitious plan that he would become the Director General of the Department of Geology led him to stop talking to him.

== Playwright ==
Kailasam's life was dedicated to local theatre and his contributions revolutionised it. His humour left an impression on Kannadigas. He opposed the company theatre's obsession with mythology and stories of royalty and shied away from loading his plays with music. Instead, he introduced simple, realistic sets. Kailasam chaired the Kannada Sahitya Sammelana held at Madras in 1945. A chainsmoker, he spent almost ten years at an apartment in Chamarajapuram which he called "Nook". Reputedly a notoriously filthy place, he loved it and wrote many dramas in there. He dictated his stories to his students at the Nook, usually starting after 10pm.

Kailasam was initially criticised for modern use of the Kannada language in his plays at a time when the language was used under strict linguistic syntax and semantics. But soon after, his works became very popular and are considered among the best in Kannada theatre, known for wit and satirical commentary on society.

== Plays ==
=== Kannada ===
- ToLLu Gatti or MakkaLiskool Manelalwe? [ಟೊಳ್ಳು ಗಟ್ಟಿ]
- Poli Kitti, The Story of a born scout [ಪೋಲಿ ಕಿಟ್ಟಿ]
- Bahishkara [ಬಹಿಷ್ಕಾರ]
- HomeRoolu [ಹೋ೦ರೂಲು ]
- Gandaskatri [ಗಂಡಸ್ಕತ್ರಿ]
- Vaidyana Vyadhi [ವೈದ್ಯನ ವ್ಯಾಧಿ]
- TaLikattokkooline? [ತಾಳಿಕಟ್ಟೋಕ್ಕೂಲಿನೇ]
- Huttadalli Hutta (Waels Within Weals) [ಹುತ್ತದಲ್ಲಿ ಹುತ್ತ]
- BandvaLvillada Badayi [ಬಂಡ್ವಾಳ್ವಿಲ್ಲದ ಬಡಾಯಿ]
- Ammavra Ganda [ಅಮ್ಮಾವ್ರ ಗಂಡ ]
- Seekarne Saavitri [ಸೀಕರ್ಣೆ ಸಾವಿತ್ರಿ]
- Sattavana Santhaapa [ಸತ್ತವನ ಸಂತಾಪ]
- AnukoolakkobaNNa [ಅನುಕೂಲಕ್ಕೊಬ್ಬಣ್ಣ]
- Namkampni [ನಮ್ ಕಂಪನಿ]
- NamkLabbu [ನಮ್ಕ್ಳಬ್ಬು]
- NammBramhaNkay [ನಮ್ಮ್ ಬ್ರಾಹ್ಮಣ್ಕೆ]
- SooLe (Murder O' Mercy) [ಸೂಳೆ]

=== English ===
- Fulfilment
- Purpose
- The Brahmin's Curse
- Simply Kailawesome (film)
