= Vivek Athreya =

Indian film director and screenwriter

- Born: Rayaprolu Vishnu Vivek; 18 October 1989 (age 36); Guntur, Andhra Pradesh, India
- Education: Sastra University
- Occupations: Film director; Screenwriter
- Years active: 2017–present
- Spouse: Sreeja Gouni
- Relatives: Hasith Goli

Vivek Athreya is an Indian film director and screenwriter, and lyricist who works in Telugu cinema.

== Early life and career ==
Vivek Athreya is from Guntur. Both his parents work in India Post. He is an electronics engineering graduate from Sastra University and worked at IBM, Chennai for five years before resigning to pursue a career in cinema. He added his Gotra Namam Athreyasa and is now known as Vivek Athreya.

His directorial debut was Mental Madhilo released in 2017. His second film Brochevarevarura was praised for the writing and the message the movie has for women. The film stars Nivetha Thomas, Sree Vishnu, Satyadev, Nivetha Pethuraj, Rahul Ramakrishna, and Priyadarshi.

Both the films were commercially successful.

His third directorial was Ante Sundaraniki, which co-starred Nani and Nazriya Nazim, released on 10 June 2022, another romantic comedy which tells the story of an inter religious couple, woven upon lies, which leads to more complex problems. This film also received positive reviews from critics.

Athreya is also a lyricist. He wrote songs in his films Mental Madhilo, and Tharun Bhascker's Ee Nagaraniki Emaindi (2018) and Keedaa Cola (2023).

== Filmography ==
Year	Title	Ref.
2017	Mental Madhilo	
2019	Brochevarevarura	
2022	Ante Sundaraniki	
2024	Saripodhaa Sanivaaram	
2027	Thulabharam	†

== Discography ==
=== As lyricist ===
- Mental Madhilo (2017): "Gummadikaya Halwa", "Oohale" and "Manavi Alakincharadate" (along with Hasith Goli)
- Ee Nagaraniki Emaindi (2018): "Maarey Kalaley" and "Veediponidhi Okateley"
- Keedaa Cola (2023): "Bring It On"

== Awards and nominations ==
Date of ceremony	Award	Category	Work	Result	Ref.
2018	7th SIIMA Awards	Best Debut Director – Telugu	Mental Madhilo	Nominated	
2020	Zee Cine Awards Telugu	Best Screenplay	Brochevarevarura	Won	
2020	Critics Choice Film Awards	Best Director	Brochevarevarura	Nominated	
2020	Critics Choice Film Awards	Best Writing	Brochevarevarura	Won	
