= Mallesham =

2019 Indian Telugu-language film

- Theatrical release poster
- Directed by: Raj Rachakonda
- Written by: Raj Rachakonda
- Produced by: Raj Rachakonda; Sri Adhikari
- Starring: Priyadarshi; Jhansi; Ananya Nagalla; Ananda Chakrapani
- Cinematography: Balu Sandilyasa
- Edited by: Raghavender V.
- Music by: Mark K. Robin
- Production company: Studio 99
- Distributed by: Suresh Productions
- Release date: 21 June 2019
- Country: India
- Language: Telugu
- Budget: ₹2.5 crore
- Box office: est. ₹5 crore

Mallesham is a 2019 Indian Telugu-language biographical film based on the life of Chintakindi Mallesham, written and directed by Raj Rachakonda. The film features Priyadarshi as Mallesham, alongside Jhansi, debutante Ananya Nagalla and Ananda Chakrapani in prominent roles. The film garnered positive reviews from critics upon release. Priyadarshi's performance in the film is regarded as one of the "100 Greatest Performances of the Decade" by Film Companion. It also won the state Gaddar Award for Third Best Feature Film.

== Plot ==
This biopic of Padma Shri awardee Chintakindi Mallesham is essentially a tale of a man going to great lengths to ease the pain of his mother, and several other women like her. The mother, Lakshmi (Jhansi), runs the home and something more — winds threads over a four-foot, v-shaped ‘asu’ continuously. It is a thankless pre-loom step, before her husband Narasimhulu (Ananda Chakrapani) can use the weft and warp and give life to ikat fabric on his loom.

== Cast ==
- Priyadarshi as Chintakindi Mallesham
- Jhansi as Lakshmi
- Ananya Nagalla as Padma, Mallesham's wife
- Ananda Chakrapani as Narasimhulu
- Gangavva as a home owner
- Jagadeesh Prathap Bandhari as Anji
- Durgaprasad K as Electrician Kiran
- Anvesh Michael as Raju
- Jayasri Rachakonda as Dr. Indira, gynecologist
- Thiruveer as Veera Pratap
- Laxman Aelay as Padma's father
- Thagubothu Ramesh as a drunkard
- Dheer Charan Srivastav as Abdul

== Production ==
Short film director Raj made his directorial debut with this film. He had seen the TED talk by Chintakindi Mallesham and wanted to create a film about Mallesham. Carl Zeiss super-speed lenses were used to shoot the film as Raj wanted the film to feel like Shyam Benegal's Susman (1987). The film was shot in Revanapally and the crew stayed in the village for a year to shoot the film. Laxman Aelay was signed as the head of art production after a hiatus of almost 25 years. His last work was Nirantharam (1995). He helped the crew by referring local artisans to the team. His drawings of weavers were used as references for the crew. The trailer released on 29 May.

== Soundtrack ==
Mallesham

Soundtrack album by Mark K Robin
- Released: 2019
- Recorded: 2019
- Genre: Soundtrack
- Producer: Mark K Robin

Mark K Robin chronology
Suryakantham (2019)	Mallesham (2019)	Agent Sai Srinivasa Athreya (2019)

The songs were composed by Mark K Robin.

Original track list (Telugu)
Song title	Lyricist	Singer(s)
"Dhana Dhana Dhann"	Goreti Venkanna	Anurag Kulkarni
"Naaku Nuvvani"	Chandrabose	Sri Krishna, Ramya Behara
"Oho Jambiya"	Goreti Venkanna	Goreti Venkanna, Rahul SipliGunj
"Aa Challani"	Dasaradhi	Anurag Kulkarni
"Kotha Kotha Ga"	Goreti Venkanna	Sri Krishna & Ramya Behara
"Amma Deevena"	Chandrabose	Sri Krishna
"Amma Deevena" (Instrumental)		
"Entha Maaya"	Ashok Peddinti	Ramya Behara
"Sethikochina Biddi"	Chandrabose	Anurag Kulkarni

== Release ==
The film was released theatrically on 21 June 2019 and was released digitally on Netflix.

== Reception ==
The Times of India gave the film four out of five stars and stated that "The film delivers what it promises – the story of a common man who dared to find a practical solution to the issue at hand, a man anyone can relate to. Director Raj Rachakonda needs to be lauded for this". The New Indian Express stated that "And yes, Raj deserves applause for churning out a film which has its heart in the right place. Priyadarshi’s complete ownership of the role is what elevates this film a few notches higher." The Hindu wrote that "This indie-spirited film is a heart-warming portrayal of tenacity and triumph". The movie was successful at the box office.

== Accolades ==
Date of ceremony	Award	Category	Recipient(s) and nominee(s)	Result	Ref.
28 March 2020	Critics Choice Film Awards	Best Actor – Male	Priyadarshi	Nominated	
28 March 2020	Critics Choice Film Awards	Best Actor – Female	Jhansi	Nominated	
28 March 2020	Critics Choice Film Awards	Best Director	Raj Rachakonda	Nominated	
28 March 2020	Critics Choice Film Awards	Best Film	Mallesham	Won	
11 January 2020	Zee Cine Awards Telugu	Special Appreciation	Mallesham	Won	
11 January 2020	Zee Cine Awards Telugu	Best Story	Raj Rachakonda, Peddinti Ashok Kumar	Won	
18 September 2021	South Indian International Movie Awards	Best Debutant Producer – Telugu	Studio 99	Won	
18 September 2021	South Indian International Movie Awards	Best Debutant Actress	Ananya Nagalla	Nominated	
18 September 2021	South Indian International Movie Awards	Best Debutant Director	Raj R	Nominated	
18 September 2021	South Indian International Movie Awards	Best Debutant Producer	Studio 99 (Raj R & Sri Adhikari)	Won	
