= Chakrapani Ananda =

Indian actor

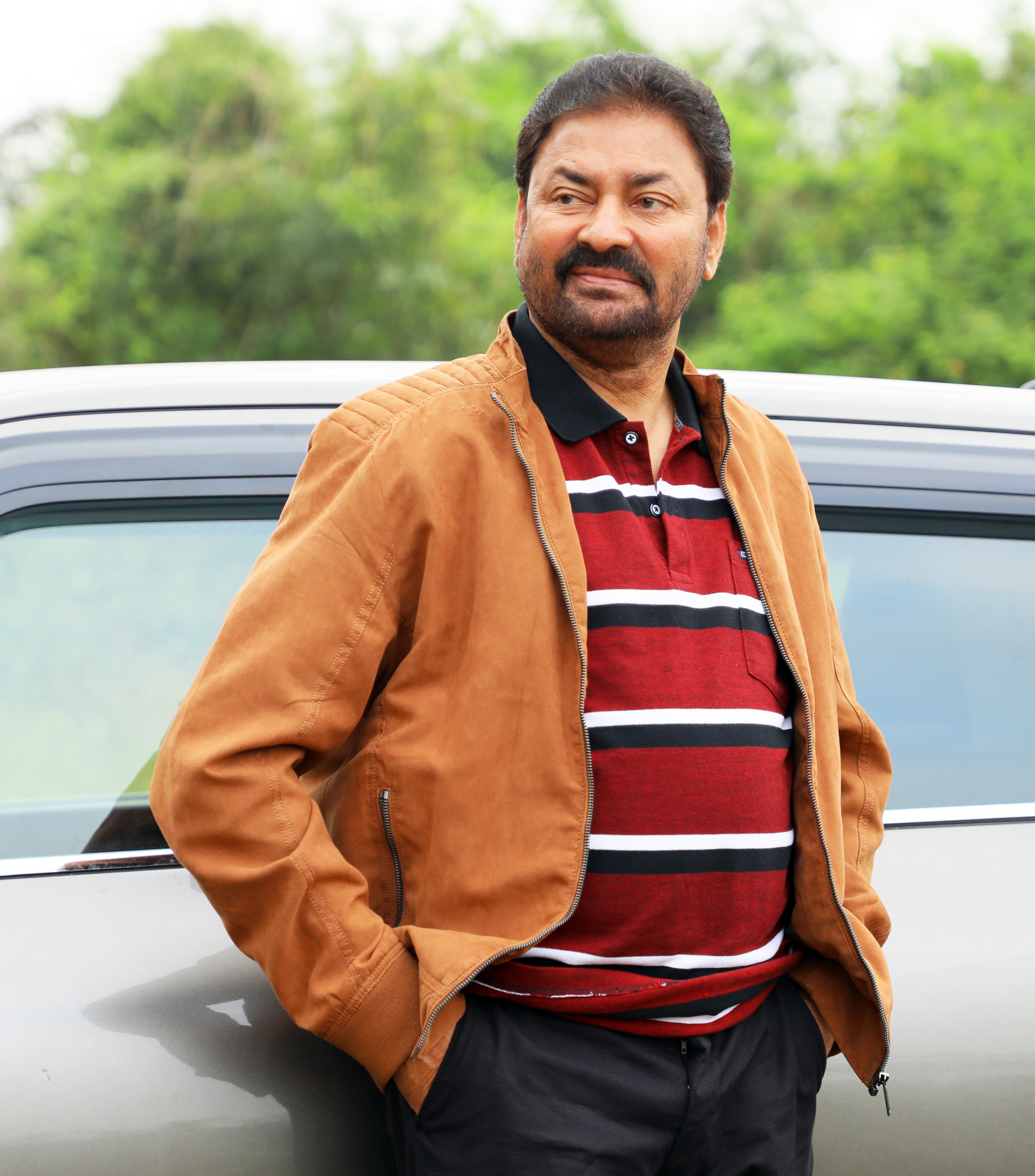
- Born: Gaddamvari Yadavalli, Nalgonda, Telangana, India
- Occupation: Actor
- Years active: 1988 - 1992; 2019 - present
- Spouse: T.K. Shailaja
- Children: 2

Chakrapani Ananda is an Indian actor who works in Telugu cinema. His notable film is Mallesham (2019).

== Early life ==
He was born in Gaddamvari Yadavalli village of Kanagal mandal in Nalgonda district of Telangana State. His family migrated to Kondrapole village in Dameracherla mandal near Miryalaguda. He started working in a printing press after leaving school, to support himself. Before acting, he worked in Advertising Agencies as visualizer and copy writer.

== Career ==
He made his film debut with B. Narsing Rao's award-winning film Daasi (1988), a role he obtained after he met Devipriya, one of the screenplay writers for Daasi. Devipriya recommended him to Narsing Rao. In 2013, he began directing a documentary titled Waiting for Death, about the impact of fluorosis on people living in his hometown of Nalgonda. Twenty-five years after Daasi, he was signed to play the role of Chintakindi Mallesham's father in Mallesham (2019). He received the role after Laxman Aelay, the production designer for Mallesham, suggested his name to the director Raj. Since Raj was in the United States at the time, the audition was conducted by his assistant. Although Ananda Chakrapani was unsuccessful in his initial audition, he requested for a second audition and was selected by Raj's assistant. His performance in Mallesham enabled him to receive further film offers.

Since Mallesham, he has appeared in Vakeel Saab, a Telugu remake of Pink starring Pawan Kalyan, and Love Story, directed by Sekhar Kammula.

== Filmography ==
- All films are in Telugu, unless otherwise noted.

Key
†	Denotes films that have not yet been released

Year	Title	Role	Notes
1988	Daasi	Bavamaridi	
1992	Chitikela Pandiri	Pani	
2019	Mallesham	Narasimhulu	
2020	World Famous Lover	Seenayya's father	
2020	V	Home Minister	
2020	Anaganaga O Athidhi	Subbayya	
2020	Play Back	Sujata's father	
2021	Vakeel Saab	Divya's father	
2021	Naandhi	Meenakshi's father	
2021	Dear Megha	Megha's father	
2021	Love Story	Mounika's father	
2021	Virata Parvam	Constable Yakoob	
2021	Ooriki Uttaraana	Narayana	
2021	Black	Adi's father	
2023	Sindhooram	Comrade Narasimhulu	
2023	Unstoppable	Minister	
2023	Tiger Nageswara Rao	Mani's father	
2023	Devil: The British Secret Agent	Ramana	
2023	Break Out		
2024	Masthu Shades Unnai Raa	Venkanna Mama	
2024	S-99	Nawab	
2024	Raju Yadav	Ramulu Yadav	
2024	Mercy Killing	Narayana	
2024	Rakshana	Kiran's father	
2024	Uruku Patela	Akshara's father	
2024	Usha Parinayam	Usha's father	
2024	Gandhi Tatha Chettu	Ramachandrayya	
2025	Shashtipoorthi		
2025	Solo Boy		

=== Television ===
Year	Title	Role	Network
2021	Unheard	Jailer	Hotstar
