= Aswin Raam =

Indian film director and screenwriter

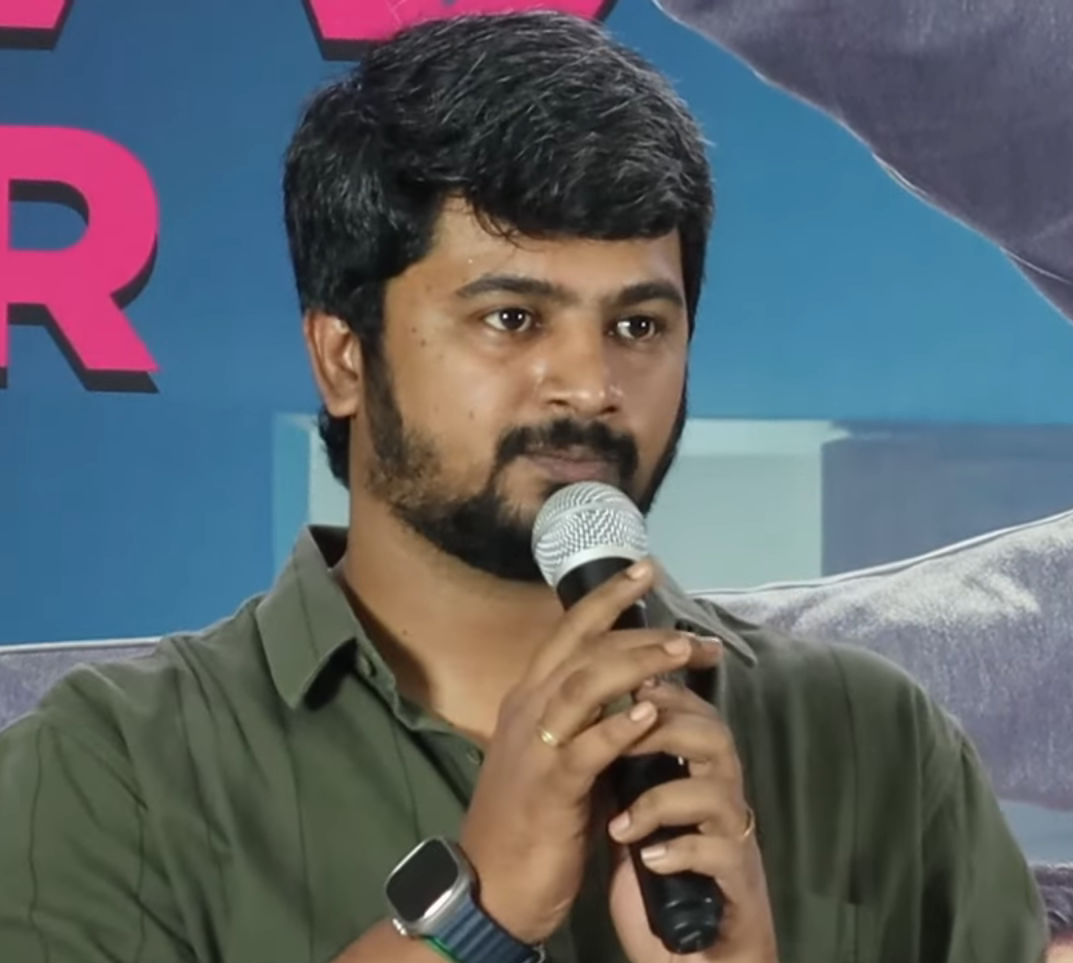
- Aswin Raam in Darling success meet

Aswin Raam is an Indian film director and screenwriter. He made his directorial debut with the film Anbarivu in 2022. His latest Telugu film, Darling, released on 19 July 2024.

== Career ==
Aswin began his career as an assistant on Atlee's film Raja Rani (2013), which influenced his approach to romantic comedies. In 2022, he made his directorial debut with the Tamil film Anbarivu, starring Hiphop Tamizha.

In 2019, Aswin worked as a creative head for the film A1 Express, where he met Priyadarshi and subsequently approached him for Darling.

== Filmography ==
As director
Year	Title	Language	Notes
2022	Anbarivu	Tamil	
2024	Darling	Telugu	

As creative producer
Year	Title	Language	Notes
2026	Meesaya Murukku 2	Tamil	

As actor
Year	Title	Role	Language	Notes
2026	Meesaya Murukku 2	Director	Tamil	
