= Romanticc Tukde =

2023 Indian Punjabi-language film

- Directed by: Varadraj Swami
- Screenplay by: Varadraj Swami; Shahzad Ahmed
- Produced by: Vijay Bansal; Priya Bansal
- Starring: Pankaj Berry; Nikunj Malik
- Music by: Bapi–Tutul
- Release date: 3 November 2023
- Running time: 100 minutes
- Country: India
- Language: Hindi

Romanticc Tukde (Hindi: रोमांटिक टुकड़े) is an Indian Hindi-language film directed by Varadraj Swami. The film stars Pankaj Berry, Nikunj Malik and Brijeshkumar Jha. The music for the film is composed by Bapi–Tutul.

== Cast ==
- Pankaj Berry
- Nikunj Malik
- Brijeshkumar Jha
- Vivekanand Jha

== Synopsis ==
Gulmohar is an innocent girl who lives in a remote area of Bihar, where she loved a boy who was teacher in a Madrasa. One day Gulmohar got to know that she has had pregnant, when she told this news to her boyfriend then his orthodox thought arose and he refused in front of the whole village that I haven't any relation with Gulmohar and with the help of extremists, he also tried to kill her in the name of religion, but somehow Gulmohar escaped, ran away other city far from the village.

Gulmohar started working in the cinema hall as a sweeper in the 1990s. Hindi cinema was quite popular. Gulmohar saw a movie for the first time, she was stunned and mesmerized by the magic of cinema. The positive impact of cinema started falling on her. Gulmohar imbibed a lot of good qualities from the ideal characters of movies, stories and she started living life like them, Gulmohar watched so many sensible movies and learnt a lot of its and got the education. In this way by the reflection of cinema, Gulmohar became a sensible woman. In the climax, Gulmohar came to her village and took revenge from her boyfriend and orthodox community

== Filming ==
The film is mostly shot in Begusarai, Bihar and some part of the film was shot in Mumbai, Maharashtra, India.
