= Unheard =

Unheard may refer to:

- Unheard (EP), the seventh extended play (EP) by Irish musician Hozier
- Unheard (TV series), an Indian Telugu-language historical drama
- Unheard (film), a 2023 Ugandan film
- UnHerd, a British news and opinion website
