= Darling (2024 film) =

2024 Indian film by Aswin Raam

- Theatrical release poster
- Directed by: Aswin Raam
- Written by: Aswin Raam
- Produced by: K. Niranjan Reddy; Chaitanya Reddy
- Starring: Priyadarshi Pulikonda; Nabha Natesh
- Cinematography: Naresh Ramadurai
- Edited by: Pradeep E. Ragav
- Music by: Vivek Sagar
- Production company: Primeshow Entertainment
- Release date: 19 July 2024
- Running time: 161 minutes
- Country: India
- Language: Telugu

Darling is a 2024 Indian Telugu-language romantic comedy psychological drama film written and directed by Aswin Raam and produced by K. Niranjan Reddy through Primeshow Entertainment. The film features Priyadarshi Pulikonda and Nabha Natesh in lead roles, with music composed by Vivek Sagar. Darling was released on 19 July 2024.

The film received generally negative reviews from critics.

== Plot ==
Raghav's only ambition is to get married and take his wife on a honeymoon to Paris. Right from his childhood, he only lives with his dream. Now he works in a travel agency. His parents set a match with Nandini, a psychologist for marriage, but Raghav gets the shock of his life when the bride elopes with someone else.

Upset with this, Raghav tries to commit suicide. He is saved by Anandi. Impressed by her character, Raghav proposes marriage to her, and Anandi accepts his proposal. Things turn on their head when Raghav finds out that his wife has split personality disorder and troubles him at night. Then Raghav meets Nandini, who offers her help to solve his problem. In the counseling, she finds out that Anandi has 5 more personalities who called themselves as Aadi the protector to Anandi, Sri Sri a spiritual person who wants to attain moksha, Papa, a child, Jhansi, a pseudo feminist and Maya, who has suicide tendencies.

Then, to save his marriage, Raghav decided to impress her personalities to leave Anandi for him. However, Raghav manages comically convinced Aadi, Sri Sri, Papa, Jhansi, and Maya. In this process, he realized the real purpose of marriage and why it gives sacred status.

Then suddenly Raghav meets a girl, which reveals that Anandi is actually Priya and the Anandi herself is a personality who has been left her home who felt her as a golden cage unable to face the loneliness Anandi became her Alter ego of her later, she left home unknown of her parents. Then, she reveals that she informed her parents about her whereabouts.

Meanwhile, Priya's parents come to Raghav's home when their reception preparations are going on and they take Priya with them. After looking at her parents, the confused Priya comes back to her older sense and goes back with them.

Later, the disappointed Raghav pays a visit to Priya, who is revealed to be an NRI in Paris, then after knowing facts, Priya apologizes for the things that happened, then Raghav encourages her to stand for herself for her problems and leaves her.

Then Priya, for the first time, successfully convinces her parents and asks them to leave her for her own good and if anything happens, she will take their help.Later, Priya meets Raghav and expresses her liking towards him and decides to travel with him in proper and to manage Raghav's parents as Anandi to them. The film ends with after 2 years, Raghav is now in his honeymoon at Paris, with Priya now fully recovered.

== Cast ==
- Priyadarshi Pulikonda as Raghava "Raghav", Priya's husband
- Nabha Natesh as Priya Rao, Raghava's wife, with DID with the following personalities:
  - Anandi
  - Aadi
  - Sri Sri
  - Jhansi
  - Papa
  - Maaya
- Ananya Nagalla as Dr Nandini, Psychiatrist; and Raghav's former fiancée
- Brahmanandam as Raghav's office Manager
- Muralidhar Goud as Raghav's father
- Kalynee Raj as Raghav's mother
- Vishnu Oi as Chitti, Raghav's friend
- Krishna Teja as Solomon, Raghav's friend
- Moin as Ravi, Nandini's husband
- Raghu Babu as Murthy, Raghav's uncle
- Venu Yeldandi as Baba
- Suhas as Rahul, a Tuition teacher (Cameo Appearance)
- Abhignya Vuthaluru, as Rahul's wife (Cameo Appearance)
- Sanjay Swarup as Prakash Rao, Priya's father
- Mona Bedre as Priya's mother
- Sunitha Manohar as Raghav's aunt
- Mullapudi Rajeshwari as Murthy's wife
- Jeevan Kumar as Auto driver
- Swapnika as Pavithra, Raghav's colleague
- Priyanka
- Shiva Reddy
- Sivaranjani
- Niharika Konidela as Priya's friend (Cameo appearance)

== Music ==
Darling

Soundtrack album by Vivek Sagar
- Released: 2024
- Recorded: 2024
- Language: Telugu
- Label: Saregama
- Producer: Vivek Sagar

Vivek Sagar chronology
Sheeshmahal (2024)	Darling (2024)

The film's soundtrack album and background score were composed by Vivek Sagar.

All lyrics are written by Kasarla Shyam; all music is composed by Vivek Sagar.

Track list
No.	Title	Singer(s)	Length
1.	"Khalasay"	Hanuman Ch, Ram Miriyala	3:43
2.	"Raahi Re" (Additional vocals: Shruthika Samudhrala)	Kapil Kapilan	4:08
3.	"Sun Chaliya" (Additional vocals: Lakshmi Meghana, Sony Komanduri, Aishwarya Daruri)	Anurag Kulkarni	4:02
4.	"Bhaag Saale"	Mangli, Kandukoori Shankar Babu	4:23

== Release and reception ==
The film was released on 19 July 2024.

Sakshi Post gave a rating of 2 out of 5 with a mixed review. Citing the film as "overdrawn, disorderly drama", Sangeetha Devi Dundoo of The Hindu wrote that "Priyadarshi and Nabha Natesh's efforts go in vain in this haphazardly written relationship drama that neither delivers laughs nor generates empathy for the characters".

Sashidhar Adivi of Times Now gave a rating of 1.5 out of 5 and opined that Nabha Natesh's performance, Ram's writing, Vivek Sagar's music and Naresh Ramadurai's cinematography effected the film negatively. He further stated "'Darling' tries to be a quirky comedy, but its incoherent plot and unlikeable characters make it hardly enjoyable".
