= Double Engine =

Double Engine may refer to:

- Double Engine (2018 film), an Indian Kannada-language comedy film
- Double Engine (2024 film), an Indian Telugu crime thriller film
