= Rakshana (2024 film) =

- Theatrical release poster
- Directed by: Prandeep Thakore
- Written by: Prandeep Thakore Thayanidhy Sivakumar
- Story by: Prandeep Thakore
- Produced by: Prandeep Thakore
- Starring: Payal Rajput; Maanas Nagulapalli; Rajeev Kanakala; Chakrapani Ananda
- Cinematography: Anil Bandari
- Edited by: Garry BH
- Music by: Mahati Swara Sagar
- Production company: Hari Priya Creations
- Release date: 7 June 2024
- Running time: 138 minutes
- Country: India
- Language: Telugu

Rakshana (transl. Protector) is a 2024 Indian Telugu-language crime thriller film directed by Pradeep Thakore.

== Plot ==
Rakshana is a tale of courage and dedication centered around the life of newly appointed lady IPS officer who is also investigating a friend's suicide whom she failed to protect. Her gut feeling tells her it was murder. Her major roadblock is the fact that the department does not believe her. To make it worse, she is framed for allegedly abetting a suicide. Who protects the Protector? Nevertheless, she is not deterred. This is the story of a female police officer who battles gender discrimination, misogyny, and even insanity attribution through path-breaking investigating journey as a protector.

== Cast ==
- Payal Rajput as ACP Kiran
- Maanas Nagulapalli as Arun
- Roshan Basheer as Ram
- Sivannarayana Naripeddi as DCP
- Vinod Bala Sub-inspector Prabhakar
- Sridhar Reddy as CI
- Chakrapani Ananda as Kiran's father
- Rajeev Kanakala as Ram's father
- Kinnera as Ram's mother
- Devi as Priya

== Soundtrack ==
Track list
No.	Title	Lyrics	Music	Singer(s)	Length
1.	"Rakshana Title Track"	Vanamali	Naresh Kumaran	Sai Charan	3:40

== Release and reception ==
Rakshana was released on 7 June 2024. Post-theatrical streaming rights were acquired by Aha and premiered on 1 August 2024. Deccan Chronicle cited the film as "a decent outing", with particular praise for Payal Rajput's performance.
