= Mercy Killing =

2024 Indian Telugu-language film by Venkatramana Surapalli

- Theatrical release poster
- Directed by: Venkatramana Surapalli
- Written by: Venkatramana Surapalli
- Produced by: Siddhartha Hariyala; Madhavi Talabattula
- Starring: Parvateesam; P. Sai Kumar; Ishwarya Vullingala; Harika Pedada
- Cinematography: Amar G
- Edited by: Kapil Balla
- Music by: ML Raja
- Production company: Sai Siddhartha Movie Makers
- Release date: 12 April 2024
- Country: India
- Language: Telugu

Mercy Killing is a 2024 Indian Telugu-language drama film written and directed by Venkatramana Surapalli. The film features Parvateesam, P. Sai Kumar, Ishwarya Vullingala and Harika Pedada in important roles. The film was released on 12 April 2024.

== Cast ==
- Parvateesam as Mahesh
- P. Sai Kumar as Ramakrishnam Raju
- Ishwarya Vullingala as Bharati
- Harika Pedada as Sweccha
- Ramaraju as Bhasavaraju
- Surya
- Chakrapani Ananda
- Gharshana Srinivas
- Fm Babai
- Shaking Seshu
- Ragastalam Laxmi
- Lab Sharath
- Hemasundhar
- Veerabadram
- Pramila Rani

== Music ==
The film's music is composed by ML Raja.

All lyrics are written by ML Raja; all music is composed by ML Raja.

No.	Title	Singer(s)	Length
1.	"Muddha Banthi Puvvulaa"	Javed Ali	4:12
2.	"Neelala Aa Kallu"	Sai Charan Bhaskaruni	3:35

== Release ==
Mercy Killing was released on 12 April 2024. It was later released on Aha on 28 September 2024.

== Reception ==
Suhas Sistu of The Hans India gave a rating of 2.75 out of 5 stating, "Venkat Raman's adept direction weaves together various narrative threads, offering a compelling cinematic experience that resonates with real-life incidents and societal issues". Sakshi gave a mixed review and praised the performances of lead cast.

== Accolades ==
Harika Pedada who acted as Swechha, was awarded with Best Child Artist at the Gaddar Film Awards which was issued by Government of Telangana.
