= Sanal George =

Indian sound designer

- Occupation: Sound engineer
- Years active: 2010 – present
- Spouse: C J Alvita (m.2017)
- Children: 1
- Website: www.sanalgeorge.com

Sanal George is an Indian sound designer and production sound mixer who is based in Mumbai. He is the recipient of the 65th National Film Award of India for Best Sound Design for the feature film Walking with the Wind. He was also awarded the Asian Film Academy fellowship in 2013 as part of the Busan International Film Festival, Busan, South Korea. Sanal was awarded the Kerala State Television Award 2016 for the Malayalam short film Chaver.

== Early life ==
Sanal George hails from Peruvannamuzhi near Calicut, Kerala. He completed his graduation before taking up his post-graduation course in Sound Recording & Design from the Film and Television Institute of India (FTII), Pune. While at FTII, he was awarded the International Indian Film Academy (IIFA) and Resul Pookutty Foundation Scholarship for academic excellence.

== Career ==
He started his career as an Assistant Sound Mixer in Shashant Shah's 'Chalo Dilli' in 2010. Over the years, he has worked in various projects including but not limited to feature films, short films and documentaries as Sound Designer and Production Sound Mixer.

He was associated with Aamir Khan's film Dangal as an assistant sound recordist to Subhadeep Mitra.

He was the recipient of the 65th National Film Award of India for Best Sound Design for the Ladakhi-language feature film Walking with the Wind, released in the year 2017. Resul Pookutty expressed his joy over George's win highlighting that he was the winner of the Resul Pookutty-IIFA Foundation Scholarship.

== Filmography ==
Film	Year	Language	Notes	Ref
Chalo Dilli	2011	Hindi	Hindi-English Bilingual First assistant sound recordist	
Chaappa Kurish	2011	Malayalam	Sound effects recording	
Astu - So Be It	2013	Marathi	ADR Supervisor	
Bangistan	2015	Hindi	Assistant sound mixer	
Fitoor	2016	Hindi	Assistant sound mixer	
Sheeshmahal	2016	Hindi/Telugu	Sound Designer	
Dangal	2016	Hindi	Assistant sound recordist	
Walking with the Wind	2017	Ladakhi	65th National Film Awards of India for Best Sound Design	
High Jack	2018	Hindi	Additional sound recordist	
The Wedding Guest	2018	English	Second unit sound recordist	
Widow of Silence	2018	Urdu	Sound designer	
Gul Makai	2018	Hindi	Sound designer	
The Gandhi Murder	2019	English	Production sound mixer	
Roam Rome Mein	2019	Hindi	Production sound mixer	

== In the media ==
Sanal George was one of the 200 alumni of the Film and Television Institute of India (FTTI) in Pune who have written a letter to the Ministry of Information and Broadcasting expressing disapproval over the institution's decision to no longer allow heads of departments to be a part of the academic council.The letter, which has been signed by numerous prominent alumni including Academy Award winner Resul Pookutty, film directors Anoop Singh and several others.
