= Mithai (film) =

2019 Indian dark comedy film

- Theatrical release poster
- Directed by: Prashant Kumar
- Written by: Prashant Kumar
- Produced by: Prashant Kumar
- Starring: Rahul Ramakrishna, Priyadarshi Pullikonda
- Cinematography: Ravivarman Neelamegam
- Edited by: Garry BH
- Music by: Vivek Sagar
- Production company: Red Ants Cinema
- Release date: 22 February 2019
- Running time: 136 minutes
- Country: India
- Language: Telugu

Mithai (transl. Sweets) is a 2019 Indian Telugu-language black comedy film directed and produced by Prashant Kumar and starring Rahul Ramakrishna and Priyadarshi Pullikonda.

== Plot ==
Mithai, a dark comedy, is set in Hyderabad where the city is a part of the narrative. Sai (Rahul Ramakrishna) is a techie in his mid-twenties, but unlike a typical brainy computer geek, he is just hanging on to his job. His only achievement, not losing his job, will be short lived.

He gets fired four days before his wedding and gets drunk with his best friend Jani (Priyadarshi Pullikonda), a jobless street-smart, self-contained alcoholic with zero ambition. Sai arrives home after the drinking session, leaving his door open unintentionally. A robber breaks in and steals a necklace among other possessions, setting off a series of events that has the characters' lives and fates criss-crossing across three days.

Accepting a challenge from his NRI friend Krishna (Ravi Varma), who rebukes Sai for being a loser, our two friends take it upon themselves to prove him wrong by nabbing the thief before getting married.

The challenge takes us along on a wild ride, encountering a host of unforgettable characters along the way. From ‘The Dude", a wise, composed guy, who has life all figured out, and is living a happy, trippy life with his pet goat Sundari to Deepti (Swetaa Varma), his detective friend. A serious method artiste, Deepti cannot get over the role of detective she played once and has taken a vow that she will not get married until she solves her first case. Will she solve the case, will she find the thief and get married, and will our friend Sai get married? That is the ride the audiences are taken on, as we follow our friends on their crazy adventure.

== Cast ==
- Rahul Ramakrishna as Sai
- Priyadarshi Pullikonda as Jani
- Kamal Kamaraju as Siddharth
- Arsha as Girl with no name
- Swetaa Varma as Detective Deepti
- Aditi Myakal as Vini
- Ravi Varma as Krishna
- Bhushan Kalyan as Dude
- Ajay Ghosh as Boss

== Production ==
Mithai was produced on Red Ants Cinema banner. The film was launched by Vijay Deverakonda and Sandeep Reddy Vanga on 14 January 2018.

Shooting began on 17 February 2018. The release date, 22 February 2019, was announced by Sandeep Reddy Vanga.

== Reception ==
The movie was poorly received by both critics and audience. Poor story and screenplay were blamed, but the actors Priyadarshi and Rahul Ramkrishna were praised and their performances were said to be the only saving grace in the movie. Cinematography work by Ravivarman Neelamegam was also appreciated.
