= Piyush Mishra =

Indian actor and musician (born 1963)

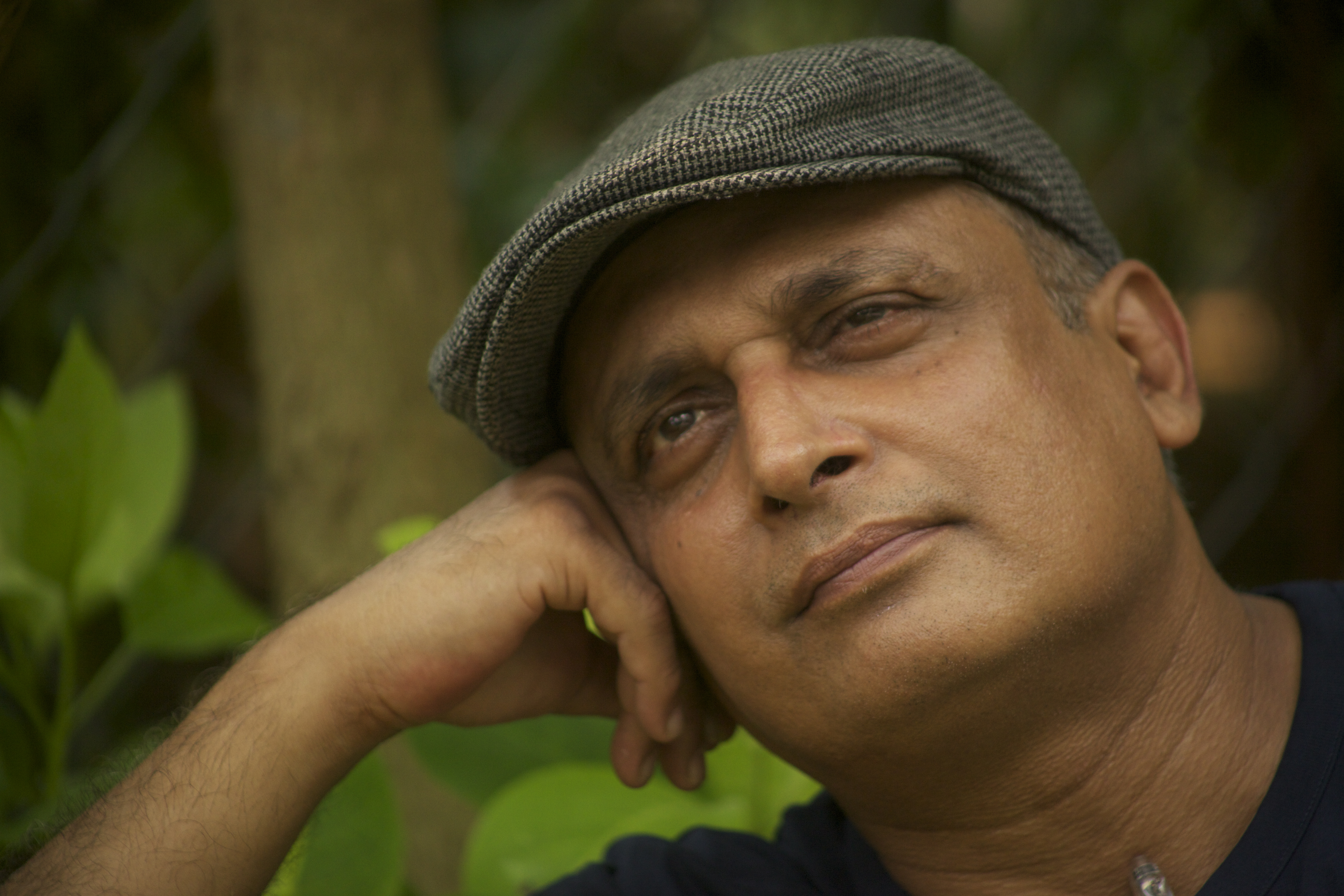
- Mishra in 2016
- Born: Priyakant Sharma; 13 January 1963 (age 63); Gwalior, Madhya Pradesh, India
- Education: National School of Drama
- Occupations: Actor; lyricist; playwright; composer; singer; screenwriter
- Spouse: Priya Narayanan (m. 1995)
- Writing career
- Years active: 1979–present

Piyush Mishra (born as Priyakant Sharma; 13 January 1963) is an Indian actor, singer, lyricist, playwright, musician, and screenwriter. Mishra grew up in Gwalior, and graduated from National School of Drama, Delhi in 1986. Thereafter, he started his career in Hindi theatre in Delhi. Over the next decade, he established himself as a theatre director, actor, lyricist and singer. He moved to Mumbai in 2002, receiving acclaim for his acting in Maqbool (2003) and Gangs of Wasseypur (2012).

As a film lyricist and singer, he is noted for his songs "Arre Ruk Ja Re Bandeh" in Black Friday (2004), "Aarambh Hai Prachand" in Gulaal (2009), "Ik Bagal" in Gangs of Wasseypur - Part 1 (2012), and "Husna" in Coke Studio (2012).

== Early life and background ==
Mishra was born on 13 January 1963 in Gwalior to Kumar Sharma. He grew up as Priyakant Sharma and was adopted by his father's eldest sister, Taradevi Mishra, who had no children. Later, his family moved into his aunt's house to ease the financial burden. His parents admitted him to Carmel Convent School, Gwalior, thinking that his education in a convent would help him excel in academics, but it was activities like singing, painting and acting that appealed to him. Piyush later moved to Gwalior's JC Mills Higher Secondary School. However, living in the authoritative household of his aunt developed a rebellious streak in him, which showed up in his first poem, Zinda ho haan tum koi shak nahin (Yes you are alive; of this there is no doubt), he wrote in class 8th. Later, while studying in class 10th, he even filed an affidavit before the Gwalior district court and changed his name to one his choice to Piyush Mishra.

Around this time, he began to be drawn to theatre – it was at places like Kala Mandir and Rangshri Little Ballet Troupe in Gwalior that his talent for the medium was first identified. In spite of the appreciation he was beginning to receive in the theatre circles, his family kept insisting he concentrate on his studies. He took the entrance test to the National School of Drama, New Delhi, in 1983, not with any particular desire to study but to get out of Gwalior. Thereafter, he moved to Delhi and joined the National School of Drama, graduating in 1986. While at NSD, he got a chance to compose his first music score for a student play, Mashreeki Hoor. His acting breakthrough came in his second year at NSD, when German director, Fritz Bennewitz (1926–95), directed him in the title role in Hamlet and introduced him to acting technique. Piyush Mishra was introduced to communism by his friend N. K. Sharma in 1989, and he was a thorough Leftist worker for 20 years.

== Career ==
=== Theater and television ===
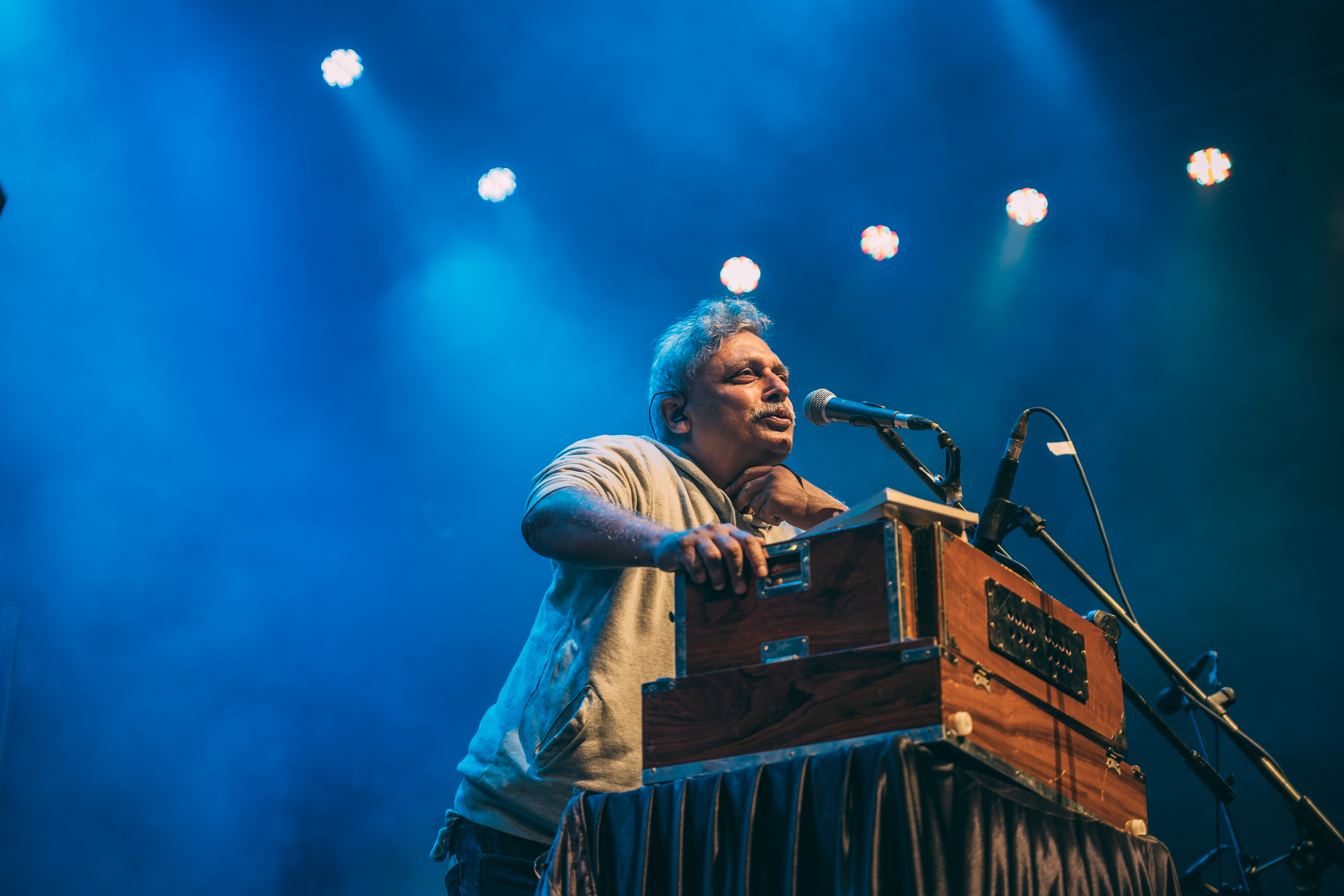
Mishra on stage during his Aarambh tour in Pune, 2023

After his graduation from NSD in 1990, Piyush Mishra started his career as a theatre actor in Delhi, and in 1990, helped start the theatre group Act One, with founder-director N. K. Sharma and stage actors like Manoj Bajpai, Gajraj Rao and Ashish Vidyarthi. In the following years he wrote and directed several plays as a part of Act One Theatre Group, including the acclaimed play, Gagan Damama Bajiyo (The Sky Resounds with the Call to Arms), based on revolutionary Bhagat Singh, which was first performed in 1994, and upon publishing, sold its first edition in just seven days. In 1996 he joined Asmita Theatre Group, and performed his popular one-man show An Evening with Piyush Mishra. He wrote the lyrics for Asmita's popular plays. Piyush acted as Maniac in Operation Three Star (an adaptation of Dario Fo's play Accidental Death of an Anarchist). Piyush is also known for his performance in Swadesh Deepak's Court Martial as Suraj Singh, first with Ranjeet Kapoor (1991) and later under the direction of Arvind Gaur (1996).

By then, he had established himself as a theatre director and directed Comedy of Terror play for Shriram Centre Repertory Company, and also presented his solo act play at the National School of Drama's Annual Theatre Festival, Bharat Rang Mahotsav in 1999. Mishra briefly moved to Mumbai, as he acted in a television series, Rajdhani (1989), directed by Tigmanshu Dhulia for Star TV, and Shyam Benegal's Bharat Ek Khoj (1988) and horror TV serial Kile ka Rahasya (1989), though he returned to Delhi thereafter.

=== Films ===
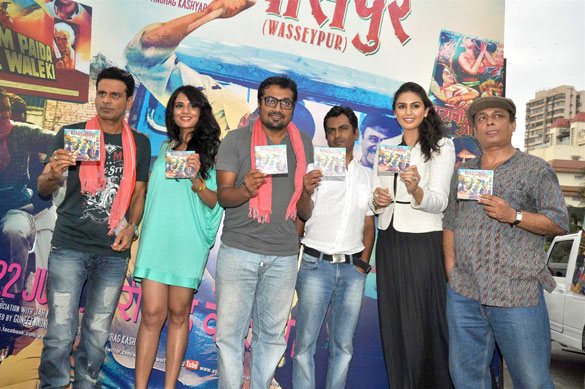
Mishra at the Audio Release of Gangs of Wasseypur, 2012

Mishra made his debut as a film actor with Mani Ratnam's Dil Se.. in 1998, he portrayed a C.B.I Investigation Officer. Though he continued to stay in Delhi to pursue theatre. His transition from playwright to screenwriter happened when he wrote the dialogues for Rajkumar Santoshi's 2001 film The Legend of Bhagat Singh, which was inspired in part by Mishra's critically acclaimed play on Bhagat Singh – Gagan Damama Bajyo. It won him the Zee Cine Award for Best Dialogue (2003). Meanwhile, he moved to Mumbai in November 2002, where he went on to establish a career as a film lyricist, screenwriter and as an actor. He started writing lyrics with the film, Dil Pe Mat Le Yaar in 2002, and subsequently wrote for Black Friday (2004), Aaja Nachle and Tashan.

Mishra won accolades for his performance as Kaka in Vishal Bhardwaj's 2003 film Maqbool, an adaptation of William Shakespeare's Macbeth. He wrote his own dialogues for his performance as Hafeez (Huffy) Bhai in Jhoom Barabar Jhoom (2007), and delivered them in poetry style.

Mishra again appeared in Anurag Kashyap's 2009 movie Gulaal, a movie based on Indian youth, politics, caste-prejudice, and other such social topics. He played Prithvi, the poet brother of Dukey Bana (played by Kay Kay Menon), in the movie. This was a role he executed with aplomb. He also wrote the lyrics for the songs in the movie, and sang a few of them as well and was also the music director of the film. He has acted in Rockstar alongside Ranbir Kapoor and was known as the 'Image is everything...everything is Image' guy. He acted and wrote lyrics of some songs for the movie Gangs of Wasseypur. His songs are very high on poetic content and have received critical appreciation from all sections of audiences and critics.

In 2014, he acted in the film The Shaukeens, along with Anupam Kher, Annu Kapoor, Lisa Haydon in the lead role, which had Akshay Kumar in an extended cameo. Piyush also appeared in The Kapil Sharma Show to promote the film with Anupam Kher and Annu Kapoor. Although the film was a remake of the 1982 film Shaukeen directed by Basu Chatterjee, it was well appreciated by the audience and was voted the best comedy film of 2014.

== Personal life ==
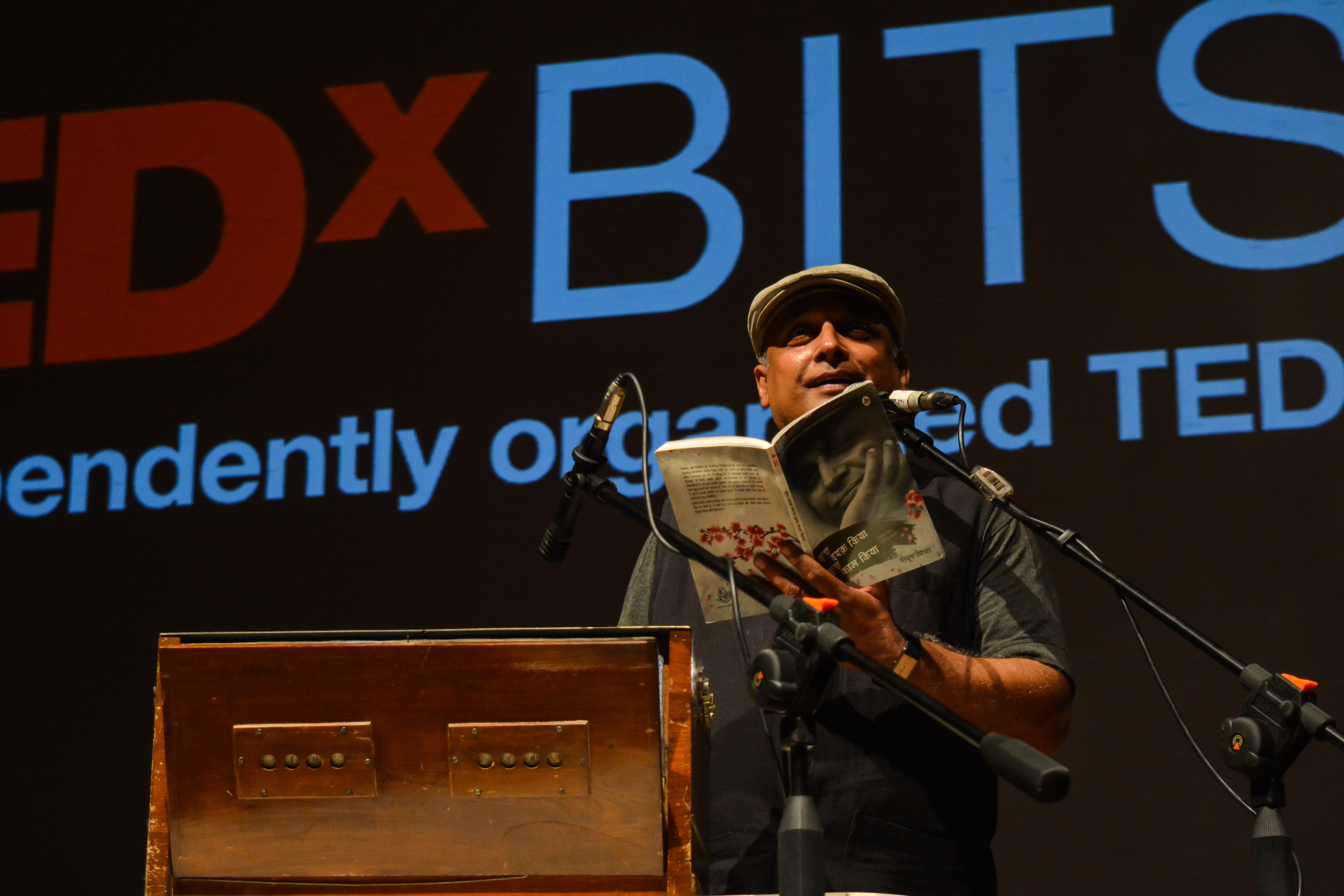
Piyush Mishra reading out his poetry at TEDxBITSGoa, 2017.

He married Priya Narayanan in 1995, whom he met in 1992 while directing a play at the School of Planning and Architecture. He lives in Andheri West, Versova, Mumbai with his wife, who is an architect, and two sons: Jai, who is pursuing Physics at Shiv Nadar University, Delhi NCR, and Josh who is currently working at Meraki Sport and Entertainment after completing his master's degree in Sport Management at Coventry University.

== Biography ==
=== Songwriting credits ===
Title	Year	Artist	Album
"Paagal"	2000	Vishal Bhardwaj	Dil Pe Mat Le Yaar!!
"Bandeh"	2007	Indian Ocean	Black Friday
"Badshah in Jail"	2007	Indian Ocean	Black Friday
"Bharam Paap Ke"	2007	Indian Ocean	Black Friday
"Opening"	2007	Indian Ocean	Black Friday
"Bomb Planting"	2007	Indian Ocean	Black Friday
"Memon House"	2007	Indian Ocean	Black Friday
"Rdx"	2007	Indian Ocean	Black Friday
"Training"	2007	Indian Ocean	Black Friday
"Chase"	2007	Indian Ocean	Black Friday
"Aaja Nachle"	2007	Salim–Sulaiman	Aaja Nachle
"Soniye Mil Ja"	2007	Salim–Sulaiman	Aaja Nachle
"Is Pal"	2007	Salim–Sulaiman	Aaja Nachle
"Koi Patthar Se Na Maare"	2007	Salim–Sulaiman	Aaja Nachle
"Dil Haara"	2008	Vishal–Shekhar	Tashan
"Tashan Main" (with Vishal Dadlani)	2008	Vishal–Shekhar	Tashan
"Tum Bhi Dhoondna"	2009	Ilaiyaraaja	Chal Chalein
"Shehar Hai Khoob Kya Hai"	2009	Ilaiyaraaja	Chal Chalein
"Jhoom Jhoom So Ja"	2009	Ilaiyaraaja	Chal Chalein
"Gup Chup Shaam Thi"	2009	Ilaiyaraaja	Chal Chalein
"Chal Chal Chal Ke"	2009	Ilaiyaraaja	Chal Chalein
"Uff Are Tu Mirch Hai"	2009	Ilaiyaraaja	Chal Chalein
"Batladein Koi"	2009	Ilaiyaraaja	Chal Chalein
"Ranaji"	2009	Himself	Gulaal
"Yaara Maula"	2009	Himself	Gulaal
"Aarambh"	2009	Himself	Gulaal
"Aisi Sazaa"	2009	Himself	Gulaal
"Sheher"	2009	Himself	Gulaal
"Beedo"	2009	Himself	Gulaal
"Duniya"	2009	Himself	Gulaal
"Raat Ke Musafir"	2009	Himself	Gulaal
"O Re Bande"	2010	M. M. Keeravani	Lahore
"Ik Bagal"	2012	Sneha Khanwalkar	Gangs of Wasseypur – Part 1
"Keh Ke Lunga"	2012	Sneha Khanwalkar	Gangs of Wasseypur – Part 1
"Loonga Loonga"	2012	Himself	Gangs of Wasseypur – Part 1
"Manmauji"	2012	Himself	Gangs of Wasseypur – Part 1
"Electric Piya"	2012	Himself	Gangs of Wasseypur - Part 2
"Bahut Khoob"	2012	Sneha Khanwalkar	Gangs of Wasseypur - Part 2
"Tunya"	2012	Himself	Gangs of Wasseypur - Part 2
"Bargat Ke Pedo"	2012	Kaustubh Tripathi-Deepak Pandit	Jalpari: The Desert Mermaid
"Daanav"	2012	Vishal–Shekhar	Arjun The Warrior Prince
"Karam Ki Talwar"	2012	Vishal–Shekhar	Arjun The Warrior Prince
"Manva"	2012	Vishal–Shekhar	Arjun The Warrior Prince
"Kabhi Na Dekhe Hastinapur Mein"	2012	Vishal–Shekhar	Arjun The Warrior Prince
"Samay"	2012	Vishal–Shekhar	Arjun The Warrior Prince
"Khandav"	2012	Vishal–Shekhar	Arjun The Warrior Prince
"Yaad Hai Yaa Bhulte"	2017	Pankaj Awasthi	Sameer
"Ye Jo, Jo Bhi Mar Gaya"	2017	Pankaj Awasthi	Sameer
"Yunhi Rastay Mai"	2018	Shuja Haider	7 Din Mohabbat In
"Hunkara"	2022	Mithoon	Shamshera
"Bholasa Mann Tha"	2024	Himself & Vivek Sagar	Sheeshmahal
"Hota Hai"	2024	Himself	Sheeshmahal
"Bhatki Raaton Ko"	2024	Indian Ocean & Vivek Sagar	Sheeshmahal

=== Singer ===
- "Chhaliya" (Tashan – 2008)
- "Aarambh Hai Prachand" (Gulaal – 2009)
- "Duniya" (Gulaal – 2009)
- "Jab Sheher Hamara" (Gulaal – 2009)
- "Ik Bagal" (Gangs of Wasseypur - Part 1 – 2012)
- "Ik Bagal" (Gangs of Wasseypur - Part 2 – 2012)
- "Aabroo" (Gangs of Wasseypur - Part 2 – 2012)
- "Manva" (Arjun: The Warrior Prince – 2012)
- "Bargat Ke Pedo Pe Shakhe Purani" (Jalpari: The Desert Mermaid – 2012)
- "Bas Chal Kapat" (Saheb, Biwi Aur Gangster Returns – 2013)
- "Chanda Ki Katori Hai (Lorie)" (Revolver Rani – 2014)
- "Chal Lade Re Bhaiya" (Revolver Rani – 2014)
- "Thaayein Kare Katta" (Revolver Rani – 2014)
- "Jigarwala Sirf Woh" (Ala Vaikunthapurramuloo (Hindi dubbed) – 2020)
- "Hunkara" (Shamshera – 2022)
- "Bholasa Mann Tha" (Sheeshmahal – 2024)
- "Hota Hai" (Sheeshmahal – 2024)

=== Composer ===
- Gulaal (2009)
- Lahore (2010) (Song: "Oh Re Bande")
- Gangs of Wasseypur (2012) (Songs: "Manmauji" & "Ik Bagal")
- Gangs of Wasseypur - Part 2 (2012) (Song: "Ik Bagal")
- Jalpari: The Desert Mermaid (2012) (Song: "Bargat Ke Pedo")
- "Hota Hai" ("Sheeshmahal") (2024)

=== Other ===
- Husna Coke Studio (India) Season 2 (2012 – Composer/Singer/Lyrics/Performer)
- O Re Manvaa (My Heart) (2012 – Composer/Singer/Lyrics)
- Tom Dick and Harry (The Dewarists) together with Akala (Composer/Singer/Lyrics)
- Ghar Coke Studio (India) Season 3 (2013 – Composer/Singer/Lyrics/Performer)
- Reunion (Google India Google Search Advertisement) (2013 – Singer)
- Parle-G New Ad: Roko Mat Toko Mat (2013 – Composer/Singer/Lyrics)

== Filmography ==
=== Actor ===
Key
†	Denotes films that have not yet been released

Year	Title	Role	Note
1988	Bharat Ek Khoj	British Indian Sepoy-Episode No 42/43 1857 Revolt	TV series
1993	Sardar	Cameo	
1998	Dil Se..	CBI investigator	
2002	Samurai	Cameo	Tamil Film
2003	Butterfly	Ghani	Short Film
2003	Matrubhoomi: A Nation Without Women	Jagannath	
2003	Maqbool	Kaka	
2003	Sala Bandar!	Nana	Short Film
2003	Ek Din 24 Ghante	Police Inspector	
2004	Deewaar	Qureshi	
2005	Super	Mama	Telugu Film
2007	1971	Major Bilal Malik	A Film Based on Indo-Pak war of 1971
2007	Jhoom Barabar Jhoom	Huffy Bhai	
2007	Rahim Murge Pe Mat Ro	Rahim Murga	Short Film
2009	Gulaal	Prithvi Bana	Stardust Award for Standout Performance by a Music Director
2009	The White Elephant	Babu	
2010	Tere Bin Laden	Majeed Bhai	
2010	Lafangey Parindey	Usmaan Bhai	
2010	Lahore		
2011	Bhindi Bazaar	Shankar Pandey	
2011	That Girl in Yellow Boots	Auto Rickshaw Driver	
2011	Rockstar	Dhingra	
2012	Gangs of Wasseypur - Part 1	Nasir Ahmed	
2012	Gangs of Wasseypur - Part 2	Nasir Ahmed	
2012	Remember a Day	Suresh Sinha	Short Film
2013	The Playback Singer	Ashok Rao	
2013	Meridian Lines	Prakash Kumar	
2014	Revolver Rani	Balli	
2014	The Shaukeens	Harishankar 'Pinky' Goyal	
2015	The Exile	Manmohan Sharma	A Short Film by Sandeep Modi
2015	Father's Day	Biju	A Short Film by Vinay Jaiswal
2015	Tamasha	Storyteller	
2015	The Homecoming		Short Film by Vinay Jaiswal & The Moody Nation
2016	Kathakaar	Short film	
2016	Tere Bin Laden : Dead or Alive	Khalili	
2016	Happy Bhag Jayegi	ASP Usman Afridi	
2016	Pink	Prashant Mehra	
2018	Sanju	D.N. Tripathi	
2018	Happy Phirr Bhag Jayegi	ASP Usman Afridi	
2019	Qatran	Husband	Short Film by Prem Singh (Large Short Films)
2020	Illegal	Janardhan Jaitley	Web Series
2020	JL50	Dr B.C Mitra	Web Series
2021	Matsya Kaand	Panditji	Web Series
2021	Illegal 2	Janardhan Jaitley	Web Series
2022	Salt City	Harish Bajpai	Web Series
2023	Kanjoos Makhichoos		
2024	Main Atal Hoon	Krishna Bihari Vajpayee	
2024	JNU: Jahangir National University	Guru Ji	
2024	Indian 2	Kishan Singh	Tamil film
2024	Rare	Divaker	
2025	Azaad	Rai Bahadur	
2025	Crazxy	"White Coat" / Dr. Nihal Chatterjee	
2025	Champion	Football coach	Telugu film
2026	Rahu Ketu	Foofaji	

=== Theatre Work ===
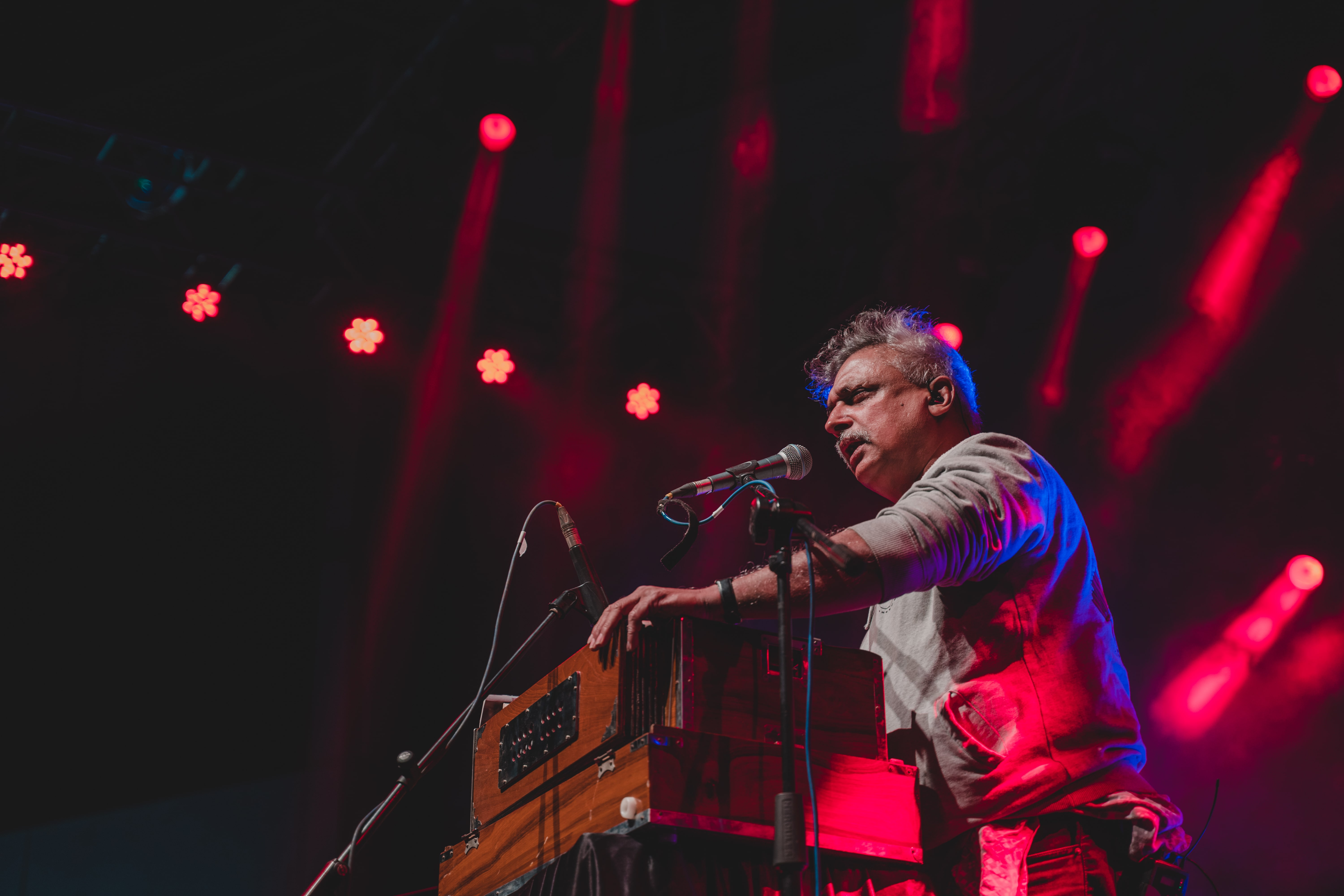
Piyush Mishra performing with his band Ballimaaraan, 2023

List of Plays
Year	Title	Actor	Director	Music	Script	Lyrics
1979	Dilli Teri Baat Nirali	Yes				
1980	Are Shareef Log	Yes				
1981	Men Without Shadows	Yes				
1982	Abu Hassan	Yes				
1983	Evam Inderjit	Yes				
1983	Bahut Bada Sawaal	Yes				
1983	Mashriq Ki Hoor	Yes		Yes		
1983	Sapna Kaali Ka	Yes				
1983	A trilogy of Mohan Rakesh (Aadhe Adhoore, Lehron Ke Rajhans, Aashaadh Ka Ek Din)	Yes				
1984	Hamlet	Yes				
1984	Urubhangam	Yes				
1985	Nekrassov	Yes				
1985	Man Equals Man	Yes				
1986	A View From The Bridge	Yes				
1986	Bholaram Ka Jeev	Yes				
1986	Raja Gopichand	Yes				
1987	Abhigyaan Shakuntala	Yes				
1987	Comedy of Terrors	Yes				
1987	Hum Sab Dataram	Yes		Yes		
1988	Arsenic & the old lace	Yes				
1989	End Game	Yes				
1990	Arsenic & the old lace	Yes				
1991	Court Martial	Yes				
1991	Holy	Yes		Yes		Yes
1991	Suno Re Qissa (Blood Brothers)	Yes		Yes	Yes	Yes
1991	Humare Daur Mein (Musical Collage)			Yes		
1992	Jab Shehar Humara Sota Hai (West Side Story)	Yes		Yes	Yes	Yes
1992	Comedy of terrors		Yes			
1993	Mahakund Ka Mahadaan (Payment as Pledged)	Yes		Yes	Yes	Yes
1993	Life & Times of Galileo	Yes		Yes		Yes
1993	Ye Jo Zindagi Hai Na	Yes				
1994	Aane Bhi Do Yaaro (Dream of Peter Mann)	Yes		Yes	Yes	Yes
1994	Wo Ab Bhi Pukarta Hai	Yes			Yes	
1994	Gagan Damama Bajyo	Yes		Yes	Yes	Yes
1994	Once Upon a Time in America		Yes			
1995	Jheeni Jheeni Mehki Mehki Seeli Seeli (Fiddler on the roof)	Yes		Yes	Yes	Yes
1996	Doosri Duniya	Yes	Yes			
1996	Duvidha	Yes	Yes	Yes		Yes
1996	Whatever happened to Betty Lemon	Yes	Yes			
1997	An Accidental Death of an Anarchist	Yes				
1997	Court Martial	Yes				
1999	Life & Times of Galileo	Yes	Yes			
2000	Ye Jo Zindagi Hai Na	Yes		Yes	Yes	
2019	Gagan Damama Bajyo		Yes	Yes	Yes	Yes

=== Screenplay and dialogues ===
- The Legend of Bhagat Singh (2002) – Dialogues
- Yahaan (2005) – Screenplay and dialogues
- 1971 (2007) – Screenplay
- Ghajini (2008) – Dialogues
- Lahore (2010) – Screenplay
- Chittagong (2011) – Dialogues
- Agneepath (2012) – Dialogues
- Shamshera (2022) – Dialogues
- Mandi House – Screenplay and dialogues (Post Production)
- Yo Jawaan Yo Kisaan – Dialogues (Post Production)

== Awards ==
Zee Cine Awards

- 2003: Best Dialogue: The Legend of Bhagat Singh (with Ranjit Kapoor and Rajkumar Santoshi)

Stardust Awards

- 2010: Standout Performance by a Music Director: Gulaal
