= Anbarivu =

2022 Indian film by Aswin Raam

- Official release poster
- Directed by: Aswin Raam
- Screenplay by: Aswin Raam
- Story by: Hiphop Tamizha
- Produced by: T. G. Thyagarajan
- Starring: Hiphop Tamizha; Napoleon; Kashmira Pardeshi; Shivani Rajashekar
- Cinematography: Madhesh Manickam
- Edited by: Pradeep E. Ragav
- Music by: Hiphop Tamizha
- Production company: Sathya Jyothi Films
- Distributed by: Disney+ Hotstar
- Release date: 7 January 2022
- Running time: 165 minutes
- Country: India
- Language: Tamil

Anbarivu (transl. Greetings) (Note: Also a portmanteau of the names Anbu and Arivu.) is a 2022 Indian Tamil-language action drama film written and directed by Aswin Raam in his directorial debut and produced by Sathya Jyothi Films. The film stars Adhi of Hiphop Tamizha in his first dual role, Kashmira Pardeshi, and Shivani Rajashekar, with Napoleon, Vidharth, Sai Kumar, Asha Sharath, and Arjai in supporting roles. The film's music and the score is composed by Hiphop Tamizha with cinematography handled by Madhesh Manickam and editing done by Pradeep E. Ragav. The film was released via Disney+ Hotstar on 7 January 2022.

== Plot ==
As MLA Pasupathy rides through Arasapuram, a village in Madurai, he narrates his story.

Pasupathy used to work as a servant for Muniyandi, the main village head of Arasapuram. At the same time, his best friend Prakasham, from the opposite village of Aandiyaapuram, falls in love with Muniyandi's daughter, Lakshmi, and they secretly get married. Muniyandi gets angry with Prakasham, but a councillor and Muniyandi's friend, Jayaprakasam, resolves the problem. Eventually, Lakshmi gets pregnant and gives birth to two twin sons, Anbazhagan and Arivazhagan. Pasupathy is enraged at Prakasham receiving the MLA post since he worked hard, so he thinks of a devious plan to cause a family feud between Prakasham and Muniyandi. Eventually, Pasupathy convinces Prakasham to leave the town, but Jayaprakasam finds out about Pasupathy's plan but Pasupathy slits his throat, killing him. The family feud turns into a dispute between the two neighbouring villages, and Muniyandi asks Lakshmi to vow to live only with him and her firstborn. Pasupathy eventually becomes an MLA.

In the present, twenty-four years later, Muniyandi lives with Lakshmi and his grown-up grandson Anbu, while Arivu lives with his father and best friend Yazhini in Canada. Anbu gets into unnecessary fights, but he loves his mother and grandfather. He hates his father. Arivu and his father have a strong bond. The district collector wants to organise a chariot festival to unite the two villages, but this causes a disagreement between Muniyandi and the Aandiyaapuram people, especially Singaram. Anbu gets angry at his mother for her past mistakes. Concurrently, Singaram decides to burn the chariot, but Anbu foils him, and Muniyandi slaps Pasupathy when he says that the law should do its duty. Arivu gets angry at his father after being shamed and shown pictures of Anbu, and his father explains why he broke up with his family. Arivu decides to fly to Madurai to meet his family.

After a fight leaves Anbu injured, Anbu and Arivu switch places; Anbu stays in Canada with his father, Prakasham, and Arivu stays in Madurai with his relatives. 'Anbu' becomes emotional after seeing his grandfather and his mother. However, after an altercation with the family bull, Marudhu, his mother, Lakshmi, realises that 'Anbu' is Arivu. Lakshmi convinces Arivu to stay with him, just him, Anbu, and his father. Muniyandi eventually discovers 'Anbu' is Arivu after he runs away from a fight and sends him away. Anbu falls in love with Yazhini. Pasupathy convinces Muniyandi to let a German company build an agriculture company to give the villagers work and a good salary. Dheena scolds him when he eats a meal at a function, and Arivu falls in love with Kayal. Singaram, still angry at Arivu and Muniyandi, wants to kill him.

Anbu shames Prakasham and calls Muniyandi to teach Arivu a lesson, so Muniyandi calls Pasupathy. Kayal professes her love for Arivu, and Singaram intervenes, but Marudhu saves him. Arivu convinces Pasupathy to sell the land for its crops, which angers Pasupathy. Kayal takes Arivu to her household, introduces him to her family, and then shows her family to Prakasham via video call. Lakshmi meets with a lorry accident, and Arivu explains how discrimination is unnecessary. Dheena apologises to Arivu, and Arivu realises Pasupathy is the mastermind behind the accident and meets him. Prakasham apologises to Anbu after Anbu reveals that he suffered a lot of pain and bullying because he did not have a father to protect him. Dheena convinces Muniyandi and Pasupathy to hold a chariot festival to unite the two villages.

At the chariot festival, Pasupathy shames Muniyandi and reveals that he killed his best friend and broke up with his family to reach his dream of becoming an MLA. Anbu and Singaram bury the hatchet after his henchmen betray Singaram. Anbu talks sense to Muniyandi. Pasupathy goes to award the German corporates, but the German tells him he is not the boss. Prakasham makes a grand entry into the village, and Pasupathy greets him with a garland. Muniyandi forgives his son-in-law, and Arivu later reveals Pasupathy as the main villain behind the village dispute, and the CBI arrests Pasupathy. The festival becomes a success with both villagers of Aandiyaapuram and Arasapuram jointly pulling the chariot.

== Cast ==
- Hiphop Tamizha in dual roles as
  - Anbazhagan "Anbu"
  - Arivazhagan "Arivu"
- Napoleon as Muniyandi, Anbu and Arivu's grandfather and Lakshmi's father
- Vidharth as MLA Pasupathy
- Sai Kumar as Prakasham, Anbu and Arivu's father and Lakshmi's husband
- Asha Sharath as Lakshmi, Muniyandi's daughter, Prakasham's wife and Anbu and Arivu's mother
- Kashmira Pardeshi as Dr. Kayal, Arivu's lover (Voice dubbed by Raveena Ravi)
- Shivani Rajashekar as Yazhini, Anbu's lover
- Arjai as Singaram
- Dheena as Dheena, Anbu's friend
- Sanjeev as DSP Naresh Pandian
- Mullai as Advocate Mullai
- Sharath Ravi as Venkat, Pasupathi's assistant
- G. Marimuthu as Sundaram, Kayal's father
- Renuka as Arivu's aunt
- Jeeva Ravi as Collector of Madurai
- Vinod Sagar as Doctor Nimmathi
- Aadukalam Naren as Jayaprakasam
- Rindhu Ravi as Kayal's mother and Prakasham's sister
- Niranjan Babu as Villager

== Production ==
Principal photography began on 20 January 2021, and wrapped that October.

== Soundtrack ==
The soundtrack and film's score were composed by Hiphop Tamizha, while lyrics were written by Vivek, Yaazhi Dragon, Hiphop Tamizha and Thamarai. The first single "Arakkiyae" was released on 22 December 2021. Another single "Ready Steady Go" was released on 27 December 2021. The third single "Kanavugal" was released on 1 January 2022. The last single "Kalangathey" was released on 5 January 2022. The audio rights were acquired by Lahari Music and T-Series.

Track listing
No.	Title	Lyrics	Singer(s)	Length
1.	"Arakkiyae"	Vivek	Yuvan Shankar Raja	3:01
2.	"Ready Steady Go"	Yaazhi Dragon	Santhosh Narayanan, Chinnaponnu, Srinisha Jayaseelan	3:50
3.	"Kanavugal"	Yaazhi Dragon	Benny Dayal, Bamba Bakya, Sam Vishal, Srinisha Jayaseelan, Sridhar Sena, Maanasi. K, Shilvi Sharon	3:25
4.	"Kalangathey"	Hiphop Tamizha	Bamba Bakya	2:24
5.	"Thanga Sela"	Thamarai	Kapil Kapilan, Pradeep Kumar	4:39
6.	"Kannirendum"	Thamarai	Saindhavi	3:23
7.	"Anbae Arivu"	Hiphop Tamizha	Deva	1:42
Total length:				22:24

== Release ==
Due to the COVID-19 pandemic in India, Anbarivu skipped a theatrical release and opted for a direct-to-streaming release via Disney+ Hotstar on 7 January 2022, a week before Pongal day.

== Reception ==
Janani K of India Today gave the film 2 out of 5 and stated that "If only the film delved deep into the actual issue, the film would have been much better." M Suganth of The Times of India gave the film 2.5 out of 5 and said "Anbarivu has a premise that we have been seeing on screen from days the days of Uthama Puthiran — estranged twins switching places and bringing down the scheming villain who has been causing trouble. The slight difference here is that rather than an action drama, director Aswin Raam gives us a rural family drama." Ashameera Aiyappan of Firstpost gave the film 1.5 out of 5 and said "Hiphop Tamizha's 'family entertainer' lacks novelty with its narrative." Sudhir Srinivasan of Cinema Express gave the film 1.5 out of 5 and said "An exhausting film punctuated by bad writing and craft."
