= Jagadeesh Prathap Bandari =

Indian actor

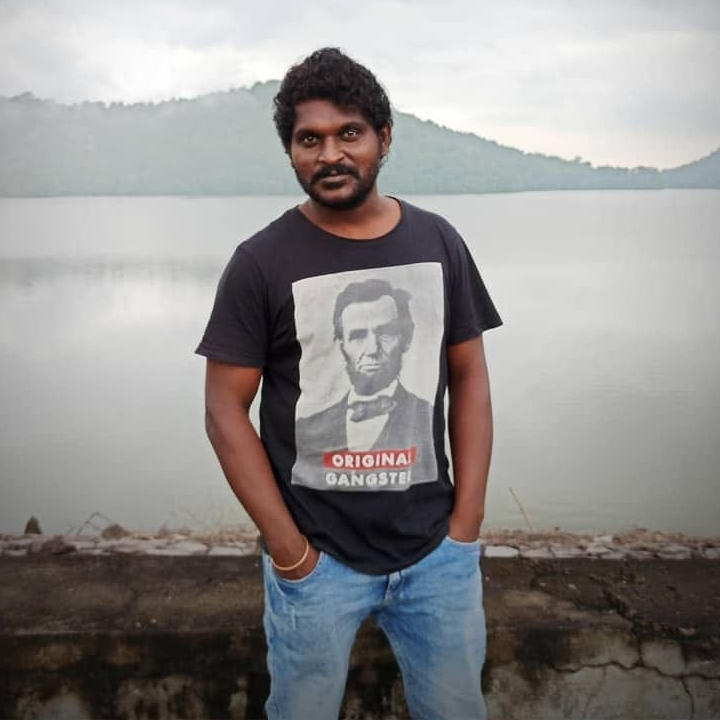
- Jagadeesh in 2021
- Born: 18 January 1993 (age 33); Chinnakodepaka, Andhra Pradesh (now in Telangana), India
- Occupation: Actor
- Years active: 2017–present

Jagadeesh Prathap Bandari is an Indian actor who prominently worked in Telugu films. He made his debut with Avanti Cinema's Nirudyoga Natulu in 2018 and was seen in Raj Rachakonda's Mallesham followed by George Reddy and Palasa 1978. His role as Kesava in the 2021 film Pushpa: The Rise brought him nationwide recognition. He was arrested in 2023 for allegedly abetting his ex-girlfriend's suicide.

== Early life ==
Jagadeesh was born and raised in Warangal and he came to Hyderabad looking for help to finish his first unreleased short film, which eventually made him a regular at short films screenings at Prasad Labs, and eventually got him a role in Nirudyoga Natulu.

== Arrest ==
He was arrested and booked under Section 306 of IPC for allegedly abetting his former girlfriend's suicide. On 2 February 2024, The Indian Express reported that he was out on bail and resumed his work on films.

== Filmography ==
Key
†	Denotes films that have not yet been released

List of film roles
Year	Film	Role	Notes	Ref.
2019	Mallesham	Anji		
2019	George Reddy	Bheem Naik		
2020	Palasa 1978	Muthyalu		
2021	Pushpa: The Rise	Kesava "Mondelu"		
2022	Pickpocket	Jaggu		
2022	Virata Parvam		Cameo	
2023	Butta Bomma			
2023	Sathi Gani Rendu Ekaralu	Sathi		
2023	Extra Ordinary Man	Abhinay's friend		
2023	O Katha	Ashok		
2024	Ambajipeta Marriage Band	Sanjeev		
2024	Double Engine	—N/a	As playback singer and lyricist	
2024	Pushpa 2: The Rule	Kesava "Mondelu"		
2024	Chivaraku Migiledhi	Gopi		
TBA	Pickpocket 2: The Murder Plan †	TBA		

=== Television ===
List of television roles
Year	Work	Role	Notes	Ref.
2017	Story Discussion	Fight Master	Uncredited Cameo	
2018	Nirudyoga Natulu	Jagadeesh	MicTV's YouTube show	
2019	Gods of Dharmapuri	Chalapathi	ZEE5 web series	
2020	Kotha Poradu	Addagutta Mallesh	Aha series	
2020	Story Discussion	Fight Master	Cameo	

== Awards and nominations ==
Jagadeesh Prathap Bandari awards and nominations
Awards and nominations
Award	Wins	Nominations

Totals (Note: Certain award groups do not simply award one winner. They acknowledge several different recipients, have runners-up, and have third place. Since this is a specific recognition and is different from losing an award, runner-up mentions are considered wins in this award tally. For simplification and to avoid errors, each award in this list has been presumed to have had a prior nomination.)
- Wins: 1
- Nominations: 1

Film	Award	Category	Result	Ref.
Pushpa: The Rise	South Indian International Movie Awards	Best Supporting Actor – Telugu	Won	
