= Gopi Galla Goa Trip =

2025 Indian Telugu film by Rohit Penumatsa

- Theatrical release poster
- Directed by: Rohit Penumatsa
- Written by: Rohit–Sasi
- Produced by: Raasta Sai Kumar; Sita Ramaraju; Ramana Reddy; Avanti Cinema
- Starring: Ajith Mohan; Raju Shivaratri
- Cinematography: Shashank Raghavula
- Edited by: Avanti Ruya
- Music by: Ravi Nidamarthy
- Production companies: Raasta Films; Aurelis Arts; Awwal Number; Avanti Cinema
- Release date: 14 November 2025
- Country: India
- Language: Telugu

Gopi Galla Goa Trip is a 2025 Indian Telugu-language coming-of-age road drama film written by Rohit–Sasi and directed by Rohit Penumatsa. The film stars Ajith Mohan and Raju Shivaratri in lead roles.

The film was released on 14 November 2025.

== Cast ==
- Ajith Mohan as Gopi
- Raju Shivaratri as Gopi
- Camp Sasi as Jack Daniels "JD"
- Raasta Sai Kumar as Gopalakrishna
- Pawon Ramesh as Aruna
- Monika Busam as Jane

== Music ==
The background score and songs were composed by Ravi Nidamarthy.

Track listing
No.	Title	Lyrics	Singer(s)	Length
1.	"Kaaka Regina Dahaalu"	Niklesh Sunkoji	Smaran	3:42
2.	"Metal Marfa"	Sai Yogi	Ravi Nidamarthy	4:04
3.	"Nallani Gopayya"	Camp Sasi	Balaji Dake	3:10
4.	"Esko"	Camp Sasi	Bolt, Laxman Meesala	3:32
5.	"Swargam"	Camp Sasi	Shrii	2:45

== Release and reception ==
Gopi Galla Goa Trip was released on 14 November 2025.

Suhas Sistu of The Hans India rated the film 3 out of 5 and opined that the film "thrives not on plot-heavy storytelling but on emotional honesty". He further stated that the film "stands out for its sincerity and raw charm". Arun Chilukuri of HMTV gave the same rating while particularly praising the cinematography and sync sound. Ramu Chinthakindhi of Times Now Telugu rated it 2.75 out of 5 praising its writing and direction.
