= Rohit–Sasi =

Indian film-making duo

- Born: Rohit Penumatsa; 10 September 1988 (age 38); Vijayawada, Andhra Pradesh, India Polavarapu Sharath Kumar; 30 March 1976 (age 50); Hyderabad, Andhra Pradesh (now in Telangana), India
- Occupations: Directors; screenwriters; producers
- Years active: 2017–present

Rohit Penumatsa and Polavarapu Sharath Kumar, collectively credited as Rohit–Sasi, are an Indian filmmaker duo known for their work as writers, directors, and producers in Telugu cinema. Rohit is also credited onscreen as Avanti Ruya, while Sasi as Camp Sasi. Their notable works include Story Discussion (2017–2020), Double Engine and Sheeshmahal (both 2024). They produce films through their own production studio Avanti Cinema. Rohit is the editor for all of their feature films.

== Filmography ==
Year	Title	Writer	Director	Actor	Notes
2024	Double Engine	Yes	Rohit	Sasi	as farmhouse owner
2024	Sheeshmahal	Yes	Sasi	Yes	
2025	Gopi Galla Goa Trip	Yes	Rohit	Sasi	as JD

=== Television ===
Year	Title	Network	Notes	Ref.
2017–2020	Story Discussion	Avanti Cinema		
2017	A Love Letter To Cinema	Avanti Cinema	Television film	
2018	Nirudyoga Natulu	Avanti Cinema		
2021	2 Shorts	Avanti Cinema	Television anthology film	
2023	Pickpocket	Avanti Cinema	Television film; producers only	
2024	Chivaraku Migiledhi	Avanti Cinema	Television film	
2026	Illu	ETV Win	Television anthology film	
