= Sathi Gani Rendu Ekaralu =

2023 Telugu film by Abhinav Dhanda

- Directed by: Abhinav Reddy Danda
- Written by: Abhinav Reddy Danda
- Produced by: Naveen Yerneni; Yalamanchili Ravi Shankar
- Starring: Jagadeesh Prathap Bandari; Mohana Sree; Vennela Kishore; Raj Tirandasu
- Cinematography: Vishwanath Reddy Chelumalla
- Edited by: Abhinav Reddy Danda
- Music by: Jay Krish
- Production company: Mythri Movie Makers
- Distributed by: Aha
- Release date: 26 May 2023
- Running time: 111 minutes
- Country: India
- Language: Telugu

Sathi Gani Rendu Ekuralu is a 2023 Indian Telugu comedy-drama film written and directed by Abhinav Reddy Danda and produced by Naveen Yerneni and Ravi Shankar. Y under the banner Mythri Movie Makers. The film features Jagadeesh Prathap Bandari, Mohana Sree, Vennela Kishore and Raj Tirandasu in primary roles. Sathi Gani Rendu Ekuralu was premiered on 26 May 2023 on the streaming service Aha.

== Plot ==
In the film "Sathi Gani Rendu Ekaralu," Sathi an auto driver inherits two acres of land, which becomes the focal point of the story. A mix of humor and heartfelt moments ensues as Sathi faces challenges, including his daughter's medical treatment and the sarpanch's interest in his land. Unexpectedly, Sathi discovers uncut diamonds, leading to a journey filled with mystery.

== Cast ==
- Jagadeesh Prathap Bandari as Sathi
- Mohana Sree as Andamma, Sathi's wife
- Raj Tirandasu as Anji, Sathi's friend
- Vennela Kishore
- Bithiri Sathi as SI Niranjan Reddy
- Aneesha Dama as Sangeetha, Sathi's cousin
- Muralidhar Goud as Sathi's uncle and Sangeetha's father

== Soundtrack ==
The film score and soundtrack album of the film is composed by Jay Krish. The music rights were acquired by Lahari Music.

No.	Title	Lyrics	Singer(s)	Length
1.	"Chinna Chepanu Pedha Chepa"	Kasarla Shyam; Nikhilesh	Jay krish	3:26
2.	"Rakita Rakita"	Kasarla Shyam	Jay krish	3:05

== Release and reception ==
Sathi Gani Rendu Ekaralu was premiered on Aha on 26 May 2023.

Shanti Nanisetti of Telangana Today wrote that "It’s difficult to bracket ‘Sathi Gani Rendu Ekaralu’ in a single genre. The movie is one of those low-budget yet high on entertainment ones set in a Telangana village with its endearing dialect, so it is safe to call it an entertainer." Writing for Deccan Chronicle Ajit Andhare opined that "Though the story seems to be complete after a hurried end, the title makes it clear that 'Sathi...' is just the first chapter which is considerably mundane and not a laugh riot as intended." Paul Nicodemus of The Times of India gave a rating of 2.5 out of 5 and wrote that "Director Abhinav Dhanda comes up with a decent Telugu dark comedy, surprisingly, without foul language. However, even though there are several moments in the film which tickle the funny bone, the film could have benefitted from more comedy and better music."
