= Revolver Rani =

2014 Indian film by Sai Kabir

- Theatrical release poster
- Directed by: Sai Kabir Shrivastav
- Written by: Sai Kabir Shrivastav
- Produced by: Raju Chadha; Rahul Mittra; Nitin Tej Ahuja
- Starring: Kangana Ranaut; Piyush Mishra; Vir Das; Zakir Hussain; Zeishan Quadri
- Cinematography: Suhas Gujarathi
- Edited by: Aarti Bajaj
- Music by: Sanjeev Srivastava
- Production companies: Wave Cinemas Ponty Chadha; Rahul Mittra Films; Moving Pictures
- Distributed by: Wave Cinemas Distribution
- Release date: 25 April 2014
- Running time: 133 minutes
- Country: India
- Language: Hindi
- Budget: ₹10 crore
- Box office: est. ₹9 crore

Revolver Rani (transl. The revolver queen) is a 2014 Indian Hindi-language crime comedy drama film written and directed by Sai Kabir. Presented by Wave Cinemas, the film stars Kangana Ranaut and Vir Das, with Piyush Mishra, Zakir Hussain and Pankaj Saraswat in supporting roles. It is a satirical love story set against the backdrop of politics. Revolver Rani was released on 25 April 2014.

== Plot ==
Alka Singh (Kangana Ranaut) is the leader of a political party that loves Rohan Mehra (Vir Das), a rising star of Bollywood. The elections in Gwalior have just finished and Alka's reign has come to an end. Her opposition, the Tomar party, has come into power and wants to use their new position to take out Alka, but first, they want to hurt her. The Tomars abduct Rohan from Mumbai and take him back to Gwalior with the aim of killing him. They are about to pull the trigger when Revolver Rani turns up, all guns blazing, and saves his life.

== Cast ==
- Kangana Ranaut as Alka Singh / Rani Behen / Revolver Rani
- Vir Das as Rohan Mehra
- Mohit Sharma as Satish Verma
- Nikunj Malik as Zahira
- Piyush Mishra as Balli
- Zakir Hussain as Udaybhan Tomar
- Pankaj Saraswat as Govind Tomar
- Zeishan Quadri as Pilot
- Kumud Mishra as Tomar
- Preeti Sood as Gutki
- Salim Javed as Puneet
- Jami Jafry as Mithilesh Singh
- Zafar Khan as Bheem Singh
- Rahul Gandhi as Jay
- Abhijeet Shetty as Viru
- Pathy Aiyar as CEO of OZO
- Sanjay Singh as Home Minister
- Mishkka Singh as Payal Parihar

== Production ==
Sai Kabir, who has directed Revolver Rani, said in an Interview, "It was a great experience... we shot the film in Chambal. It's a black comedy and it's a political film". Producer Tigmanshu Dhulia says that Revolver Rani is a complete B grade entertainment movie and everybody will like it. It was reported that Kangana Ranaut and other crew members were stopped by rebels near Chambal valley to capture photos with Kangana. Kangana denied their request and succeeded getting herself and the crew out from the spot.

== Themes ==
Revolver Rani is an experimental film that can best be described as an indigenous tongue-in-cheek Western featuring a rugged cowgirl as opposed to a cowboy straight out of some Western pulp novel.

== Soundtrack ==
Revolver Rani

Soundtrack album by Sanjeev Srivastava
- Released: 2014
- Genre: Feature film soundtrack
- Length: 61:53
- Language: Hindi
- Label: T-Series
External audio
- Audio Jukebox - Part 1 on YouTube
- Audio Jukebox - Part 2 on YouTube

The soundtrack composed by Sanjeev Srivastava received positive reviews. The soundtrack consists of 9 tracks with Usha Uthup singing title number "Revolver Rani" which reflected the style of R. D. Burman. The lyrics have been penned by Shaheen Iqbal and Puneet Sharma. Moreover, the composer Sanjeev Srivastava and lyricist Puneet Sharma are new. The soundtrack of Revolver Rani is unconventional and largely experimental. Rediff gave 3/5 stars for the soundtrack.

=== Track listing ===
No.	Title	Singer(s)	Length
1.	"Revolver Rani"	Usha Uthup
2.	"Thaayein Kare Katta"	Piyush Mishra
3.	"Kaafi Nahi Chaand"	Asha Bhosle
4.	"Chal Lade Re Bhaiya"	Mayur Vyas, Piyush Mishra, Abhishek Mukherjee
5.	"Sulgi Hui Hai Raakh"	Gorisa, Sanjeev Srivastava
6.	"Banna Banni"	Rekha Bhardwaj
7.	"I Am Brutal"	Sanjeev Srivastava
8.	"Saawan Ki Aye Hawa"	Rahul Gandhi, Garima Aneja
9.	"Bol Rahi Hai Payal"	Avi Dutta, Anwesha Datta Gupta
10.	"Chanda Ki Katori Hai (Lorie)"	Garima Aneja
11.	"Pehle Lohe Ki Chingaari"	Sameera, Gorisa, Keka, Manjeera
12.	"We Mix You Michael Jackson"	Saleem Javed
13.	"Zardozi Lamhe"	Moin Sabri
14.	"Chanda Ki Katori Hai (Lorie)"	Piyush Mishra
15.	"Revolver Rani (Reprise)"	Usha Uthup

== Critical reception ==
It has received an aggregate score of 5.6 (out of 10) on the review aggregating site TheReviewMonk, based on 30 critic reviews. As per Shubha Shetty-Saha of Mid-Day The film Revolver Rani starts with much promise, with a kind of quirkiness and black humour that fits well, but it begins to fizzle out by the end of it. Watch it for Kangana Ranaut and the music. Film critic Subhash K. Jha rated it 3.5 stars and wrote that Revolver Rani is a fiercely original piece of cinema, crafted with compelling concentration and impassioned intuition. As per Jha, Kangana plays like a cross between Uma Thurman in Kill Bill and Seema Biswas in Bandit Queen. Giving it 3 stars out of 5, Anupama Chopra praised the film in a review for Hindustan Times saying that "what keeps Revolver Rani together are the performances and the sly humour. I particularly enjoyed the two testosterone-filled duffer politicians whose only aim is to kill Alka. If you like uplifting, cheerful cinema, then this isn't the movie for you. But if, like me, you can enjoy bad people doing bad things, then Revolver Rani will be fun." Harshada Rege from Daily News and Analysis praised Ranaut's performance, saying that "she plays the Venice-loving, gun-trotting politician in Chambal with much aplomb. From a vulnerable Rani in Queen to the mighty Alka Singh in Revolver Rani, the actress sure knows how to make and then, equally easily, break the mould." Shubhra Gupta from The Indian Express panned the film, saying that the character of Rani in the film was neither believable or relatable, making it "a tiresome Bollywoodesque trudge... It is clear that Kangana Ranaut is trying hard for the 'sur' (mass), but this is not her territory: she gets to that well-judged manic edge only a couple of times, and then slides back. Her hold on the character is slippery, as is her accent, and the shade of her tan."

== Box office ==
This film had a brilliant run in the Indian Box Office with an occupancy of 95%.
