= Kadirenigudem =

- village
- Country: India
- State: Telangana
- District: Nalgonda
- Talukas: Ramannapet

Government
  - Type: Panchayati raj (India)
  - Body: Gram panchayat

Languages
  - Official: Telugu
- Time zone: UTC+5:30 (IST)
- Vehicle registration: TS
- Website: telangana.gov.in

Kadirenigudem or Kadireni Gudem is a village in Nalgonda district, Telangana, India.

== Notable people ==
Laxman Aelay (born 1965), artist
