= Kotha Poradu =

Indian action thriller television series

- Promotional poster
- Genre: Romantic drama
- Written by: Anvesh Michael
- Directed by: Anvesh Michael
- Starring: Anvesh Michael; Sudhakar Reddy; Raj Tirandasu; Sai Prasanna; Jagadeesh Prathap Bandari; Padma
- Music by: Smaran
- Country of origin: India
- Original language: Telugu
- No. of seasons: 1
- No. of episodes: 10

Production
- Executive producer: Sameer Kalyani
- Producers: Mahi Illindra; Tanvi Desai
- Cinematography: Vasu Pendem
- Editor: Rohit Penumatsa

Original release
- Network: aha
- Release: 26 January 2020

Kotha Poradu is a 2020 Indian Telugu-language romantic drama television series written, directed and acted by Anvesh Michael, who co-stars alongside Sudhakar Reddy, Raj Tirandasu, Sai Prasanna, Jagadeesh Prathap Bandari, and Padma. The series was released on 26 January 2020 on aha.

== Cast ==
- Anvesh Michael as Raju
- Sudhakar Reddy as Istarayya
- Raj Tirandasu as Nethi Rajesh
- Sai Prasanna as Begumpet Sukanya
- Jagadeesh Prathap Bandari as Addagutta Mallesh
- Padma as Lachamma
- Nagma as Thanmai Bolt
- Anusha Nuthala as Rajitha
- Purnachandra as Yakadu
- Sripal Macharla as Director
- Camp Sasi as Producer

== Episodes ==
No.	Title	Directed by	Written by	Original release date
1	"Kotlata"	Anvesh Michael	Anvesh Michael	26 January 2020
2	"Paisal Papaal"	Anvesh Michael	Anvesh Michael	26 January 2020
3	"Rendo Panchayati"	Anvesh Michael	Anvesh Michael	26 January 2020
4	"Jammi Chettu"	Anvesh Michael	Anvesh Michael	26 January 2020
5	"Izzat Ke Savaal"	Anvesh Michael	Anvesh Michael	26 January 2020
6	"Kotha Poradu"	Anvesh Michael	Anvesh Michael	26 January 2020
7	"Aitava Hero"	Anvesh Michael	Anvesh Michael	26 January 2020
8	"Lolli"	Anvesh Michael	Anvesh Michael	26 January 2020
9	"Amma Ayya Appu Pori"	Anvesh Michael	Anvesh Michael	26 January 2020
10	"Raju Gaadu Hero"	Anvesh Michael	Anvesh Michael	26 January 2020

== Production ==
Anvesh Michael was inspired by children selling clothes in Besant Nagar, Chennai and Begum Bazaar, Koti and Monda Market, Hyderabad, and decided to make a film on it and shot it for nine days. He approached the production company MicTv (who made Nirudyoga Natulu), but they were busy with another film and asked Michael to wait. After 200 narrations, Michael pitched the idea to Allu Aravind's aha, who agreed to make it a series. The series is set in remote Telangana in the fictional town of PK Palli. The series was shot in the village of Brahmanapally and near Pochampally.

== Soundtrack ==
Anvesh Michael also worked as a lyricist for the songs "Notla Beedilu Vettandi" and "Ayithava Ayithava Hero".

== Reception ==
Thadhagath Pathi of The Times of India rated the series 3.5/5 stars and wrote, "Kotha Poradu is bold and fresh. It is sure to win you over if you enjoy new and real content. A critic from VoxSpace wrote, "Coming from the same school of thought [as Story Discussion and Nirudyoga Natulu], Anvesh Michael with Kotha Poradu creates a well-observed dramedy about the intricacies of social life in a small village far from any influence of globalization". Srivathsan Nadhadhur of Binged rated the series 6/10 and wrote, "Kotha Poradu works despite its limitations because of its racy screenplay. The episodes are crisply edited, the characters are established quickly".
