= Unheard (TV series) =

2021 Indian streaming Web TV series

- Promotional poster
- Genre: Historical fiction; Drama
- Created by: Aditya K. V
- Written by: Aditya K. V.; Anirudh Krishna Murthy (Telugu); Ray Ain Asrar (Urdu)
- Directed by: Aditya K. V.
- Starring: Baladitya; Chandini Chowdary; Priyadarshi Pulikonda; Ananda Chakrapani; Ajay; Srinivas Avasarala; Venkat; Jay Jha
- Composer: Naresh Kumaran
- Country of origin: India
- Original language: Telugu
- No. of seasons: 1
- No. of episodes: 6

Production
- Executive producer: Rohith Pisapati
- Producer: Radhika Lavu
- Production location: India
- Cinematography: Abhiraj Nair
- Editor: Garry BH
- Running time: 17–26 minutes
- Production company: Ellanar Films

Original release
- Network: Disney+ Hotstar
- Release: September 17, 2021

Unheard is an Indian Telugu-language historical drama television series created and directed by Aditya K. V. for Disney+ Hotstar. The series has an ensemble cast of Srinivas Avasarala, Priyadarshi Pulikonda, Ajay, Baladitya, Chandini Chowdary, and Ananda Chakrapani. The series premiered on 17 September 2021.

== Premise ==
Set in the period of 1905–1950, the series is based on the Indian independence movement in the Hyderabad State in common people's point of view on various major events during the said period.

== Cast ==
- Baladitya as Dr. Chalapathi
- Chandini Chowdary as Padma
- Priyadarshi Pulikonda as Badri
- Ananda Chakrapani as Jailer Satyanarayana
- Ajay as Mallesh
- Srinivas Avasarala as Anwar
- Venkat as Ramaiah
- Jay Jha as Ahmed

== Episodes ==
Episode	Title	Directed by	Written by	Date of Broadcast
1	"Swayam – Self"	Aditya K. V	Aditya K. V; Anirudh Krishna Murthy; Ray Ain Asrar	September 17, 2021
2	"Karma – Action"	Aditya K. V	Aditya K. V Anirudh Krishna Murthy; Ray Ain Asrar	September 17, 2021
3	"Yajna – Sacrifice"	Aditya K. V	Aditya K. V; Anirudh Krishna Murthy; >Ray Ain Asrar	September 17, 2021
4	"Tamasa – Chaos"	Aditya K. V	Aditya K. V; Anirudh Krishna Murthy; >Ray Ain Asrar	September 17, 2021
5	"Ekatva – Identity"	Aditya K. V	Aditya K. V; Anirudh Krishna Murthy; >Ray Ain Asrar	September 17, 2021
6	"A Tribute to Hyderabad"	Aditya K. V	Aditya K. V; Anirudh Krishna Murthy; >Ray Ain Asrar	September 17, 2021

== Production ==
Filming of the series was done between September and November 2020 following the COVID-19 protocols in and around Hyderabad. Cast and Crew were connected virtually for workshops on their individual roles. As the show pans decades, a lot of prosthetic work was involved on the cast to look appropriate for the year the sequences take place.

== Themes ==
Aditya is an author who wrote the book Daitya Dairies. After making 13 years of research on the events, he has written the story and making debut as the filmmaker. Deccan Chronicle reported that "The 1918 influenza pandemic, the Spanish flu, which killed around 25 million, is one of the important episodes. Mahatma Gandhi also suffered from the Spanish Flu and was in isolation. The series chronicles how these deaths fuelled the freedom moment. It was during this time the movement gained momentum and began to spread." The series also showcases the lives of the people of the period and the battle they had fought against British and the Nizam of Hyderabad. Some of the major events that are shown are non-cooperation movement, chauri chaura incident and others.

== Release ==
Billed as the first Telugu Hotstar Specials show, all the episodes of the series were premiere on Disney+ Hotstar on 17 September 2021, although it was initially scheduled to premiere on 15 August 2021. The series was initially screened privately for the Vice President of India, Venkaiah Naidu. The show was also selected for screening at the 11th Dada Saheb Phalke Film Festival. In the United States, the show was streamed exclusively on Hulu.

== Reception ==
Sangeetha Devi Dundoo writing for The Hindu said, "If you can look past the staged theatre-like presentation, ‘Unheard’ can whet the appetite to know more about India's freedom struggle, through conflicting ideologies." Praising the performances, The Times of India critic Thadagadh Pathi wrote, "Actors like Ajay, Priyadarshi, Srinivas Avasarala, Chandini Chowdary and Baladitya deliver mature performances, which works well for the series. It is not an easy feat to perform such dialogue-driven characters and stories."
