= Priyadarshi Pulikonda =

Indian actor

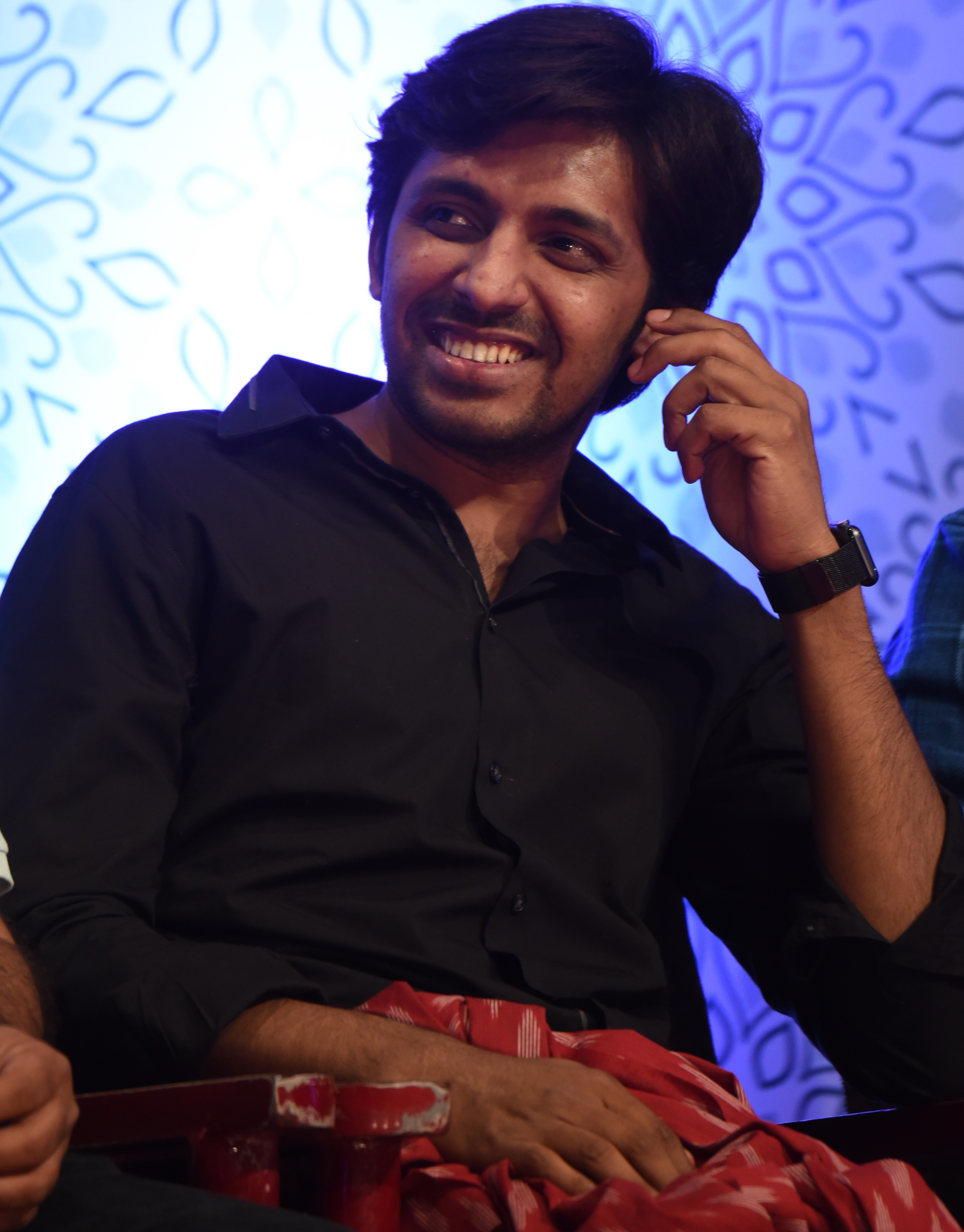
- Pulikonda in 2019
- Born: August 25, 1989 (age 37); Khammam, Andhra Pradesh, India (now in Telangana, India)
- Education: University of Hyderabad
- Occupations: Actor; comedian
- Years active: 2016–present
- Spouse: Richa Sharma (m. 2018)

Priyadarshi Pulikonda is an Indian actor and comedian who works in Telugu films. He gained recognition for his role in Pelli Choopulu (2016). In addition to supporting roles, Priyadarshi played the lead in films such as Mallesham (2019), Mithai (2019), and Balagam (2023). His performance in Mallesham (2019) appeared in the "100 Greatest Performances of the Decade" by Film Companion.

== Early and personal life ==
Priyadarshi was born in a Telugu family in Khammam, India to Pulikonda Subbachary, a professor, and Jayalakshmi. Priyadarshi's parents shifted to Hyderabad when he was 2 years old and they have been living there since then. They lived in the Old City until he was 10 and later moved to Gachibowli. He did his Bachelor of Science in Statistics from MNR Degree & PG College and has a postgraduate degree in Mass Communication from the University of Hyderabad.

Priyadarshi married writer Richa Sharma in 2018, who was his senior at the University of Hyderabad.

== Career ==
Priyadarshi played the role of a terrorist in the 2016 film Terror which was met with critical acclaim. He gained significance for his portrayal of Kaushik in the successful 2016 romantic comedy Pelli Choopulu. The film was praised for story line, performances and clean humour and Priyadarshi was praised for his speech in Telangana dialect in the film. He has acted in a web series Loser in which he played the role of a rifle shooter. His performance was appreciated by critics.

In an interview with The Hindu, he said he was inspired to become an actor after watching Sagara Sangamam, calling it a "paradigm shift". He is a fan of actors Kamal Haasan and Chiranjeevi, and directors K. Balachander, K. Viswanath, and Singeetam Srinivasa Rao.

Besides working in several short films, he has appeared in Jai Lava Kusa, which stars NTR Jr., Nivetha Thomas and Raashi Khanna. He also appeared in the Mahesh Babu starrer Spyder, directed by AR Murugadoss.

== Filmography ==
=== As an Actor ===
Year	Title	Role	Notes
2016	Terror	Terrorist	
2016	Pelli Choopulu	Kaushik	
2016	Bommala Ramaram	Ramanna	
2017	Ghazi	Lt. Nilesh Mishra	
2017	Winner		
2017	Arjun Reddy	Vipul	
2017	Keshava	Keshava's friend	
2017	Mister	Doctor	
2017	Babu Baga Busy	Chiru	
2017	Darsakudu		
2017	Yuddham Sharanam	Alex	
2017	Jai Lava Kusa	Obulesh ‘Obs’	
2017	Spyder	Vinay	
2017	Vunnadhi Okate Zindagi	Sathish	
2017	Egise Tarajuvvalu	Somaraju	
2017	Middle Class Abbayi	Darshi	
2017	Idi Maa Prema Katha		
2018	Rangula Ratnam	Vishnu's friend	
2018	Kanam	Sub Inspector Agni	
2018	Tholi Prema	Ravi	
2018	Manasuku Nachindi	Sarath	
2018	Awe	Nala	
2018	Nela Ticket	Lawyer Yadagiri	
2018	W/O Ram	Police Officer Chary	
2018	Padi Padi Leche Manasu	Darshi	
2019	F2	Darshi	
2019	Mr. Majnu	Chitti	
2019	Mallesham	Chintakindi Mallesham	
2019	1st Rank Raju	Chintu	
2019	Mithai	Jani	
2019	Brochevarevarura	Rocky	
2019	Gang Leader	Ramakrishna	
2019	Rama Chakkani Seetha	Pushkar	
2020	World Famous Lover	Gautham's friend	
2020	Bombhaat	Karun	
2020	Guvva Gorinka	Raghuram	
2021	Mail	Hybath	
2021	Naandhi	Radha Prakash	
2021	Jathi Ratnalu	Jogipet Sekhar	
2021	A1 Express	Darshi	
2021	Ichata Vahanamulu Niluparadu	Puli	
2021	WWW	Ashraf	
2022	Radhe Shyam	Subbarao	
2022	Sita Ramam	Journalist Marthandam	
2022	Oke Oka Jeevitham	Chaitanya "Chaitu"	
2022	Gurthunda Seethakalam	Dev's friend	
2023	Balagam	Saayilu	
2023	Mangalavaaram	Ravi	
2023	Hi Nanna	Justin	
2024	Thappinchuku Thiruguvadu Dhanyudu Sumathi		
2024	Om Bheem Bush	Vinay Gummadi	
2024	Darling	Raghava	
2024	35 Chinna Katha Kaadu	Chanakya Varma	
2025	Game Changer	Ram's friend	
2025	Court	Surya Teja	
2025	28 Degree Celsius	Karthik's friend	
2025	Sarangapani Jathakam	Sarangapani	
2025	Mithra Mandali	Chaitanya	
2025	Premante	Madhi	
2026	Suyodhana	Varun	
2026	The Paradise	MLA Shankar Rao (based on KCR)	

=== Voice actor ===
Year	Title	Actor	Notes	Ref.
2018	Gang	RJ Balaji	Telugu dubbed version	
2019	Frozen 2	Olaf	Telugu dubbed version	

=== Other language films ===
Year	Title	Role	Language
2017	The Ghazi Attack	Lt. Nilesh Mishra	Hindi
2017	Take Off	Indian in Iraq	Malayalam
2017	Spyder	Madhu	Tamil
2018	NOTA	Wong	Tamil
2022	Radhe Shyam	pyaare mohan	Hindi

=== Television ===
Year	Title	Role	Network	Ref.
2020–present	Loser	Suri Yadav	ZEE5	
2020	Story Discussion	DOP	Avanti Cinema	
2021	In the Name of God	Aadi	Aha	
2021	Unheard	Badri	Disney+ Hotstar	
2023–present	Save the Tigers	Ghanta Ravi	Disney+ Hotstar	

== Awards and nominations ==
Year	Award	Category	Work	Result	Ref.
2016	2nd IIFA Utsavam	Best Performance In A Comic Role – Telugu	Pelli Choopulu	Won	
2017	7th South Indian International Movie Awards	Best Comedian – Telugu	Pelli Choopulu	Won	
2019	Radio City Cine Awards S2	Best Comedian	Tholi Prema	Won	
2020	Zee Cine Awards Telugu	Best Comedian	Brochevarevarura	Won	
2020	Critics' Choice Film Awards	Best Actor – Male	Mallesham	Nominated	
2021	9th South Indian International Movie Awards	Best Comedian – Telugu	Brochevarevarura	Nominated	
