= Sheeshmahal =

- Sheeshmahal Release Poster (2024)
- Directed by: Camp Sasi
- Written by: Rohit–Sasi
- Produced by: Snehal Jangala
- Starring: Rahul Ramakrishna; Master Sai; Pramila Boddeti; Feroze Ahmed
- Cinematography: Gnana Shekar V. S.
- Edited by: Avanti Ruya
- Music by: Vivek Sagar
- Production companies: Avanti Chitranaalayam; Million Dreams Creations
- Release date: February 14, 2024
- Running time: 112 Minutes
- Country: India

Sheeshmahal is a 2024 Indian anthology film, based on India's International Children's Film Festival, and directed by Camp Sasi. The film is jointly produced by Million Dreams Creations and Avanti Chitranaalayam. Vivek Sagar has composed music for the film with Piyush Mishra and Rahul Ram of Indian Ocean (band) as lyricist and singers. The film also depicts majority of Hyderabad city and its culture before the metro lookover. Although the film was shot in 2013, and had a few private screening events, the film was theatrically released on 14 February 2024. The film features segments in Telugu and English.

== Cast ==
The Documentary:

- Rahul Ramakrishna as Filmmaker
- Camp Sasi as Senior cameraman
- Rahul Penumatsa as Cameraman
- Rohit Penumatsa as Rk's roommate
- Anantha Perumal as Rk's friend
- Prerana as Rk's girlfriend

The Teenagers:

- Arnold as Advaith
- Pramila Boddeti as Lavanya
- Appu as Lavanya's friend
- Poornima as Lavanya's mother
- Vijaya as Teacher

The Canteen Owner:

- Feroze as Canteen owner
- Sandhya as Sakhina
- Gopal as Canteen boy

The Fakeer:

- Sai as Fakeer
- Old Fakeer as Khaleel
- Sridhar as Police
- Venkatesh as Fakeer's friend

== Production ==
The production for Sheeshmahal started in 2014. The film was initially titled Festen. The film was shot in 27 days around the International Children's Film Festival which is hosted every 2 years in Hyderabad. Sheeshmahal takes an independent look at the experiences of participants from different states. Director Camp Sasi said “The best way to capture the real flavor of the fest was to shoot the film during the fest itself; no amount of set designing can replicate the mood. The atmosphere itself lends to a very good mood-building scene.”

While the movie was being filmed, most of the cast and crew were newcomers, including music director Vivek Sagar, cinematographer Gnana Shekar V. S., actor Rahul Ramakrishna, writer and director Camp Sasi. By the time of its theatrical release, Vivek Sagar has grown to be a household name, Rahul Ramakrishna became a mainstream film actor, and sound designer Sanal George went on to win 65th National Film Awards for Best Sound Design.

== Soundtrack ==
Sheeshmahal

Soundtrack album by Vivek Sagar
- Released: 20 November 2016
- Recorded: 2016
- Genre: Film soundtrack
- Length: 29:57
- Language: Hindi, Telugu, English, Tamil
- Label: Tapeloop
- Producer: Vivek Sagar

Vivek Sagar chronology
Pelli Choopulu (2016)	Sheeshmahal (2016)	Yuddham Sharanam (2016)

The music was composed by Vivek Sagar with one song composed by Piyush Mishra. The album was first released in 2016. The album comprises four Hindi songs including a bhajan, one Tamil, one Telugu, and one English. Critics regarded "Rainbows in the Sky" and "Citramaga" as the album's highlights.

Track-List
No.	Title	Lyrics	Music	Singer(s)	Length
1.	"Hota Hai"	Piyush Mishra	Piyush Mishra	Piyush Mishra	3:49
2.	"Citramaga"	Kala Sandeep	Vivek Sagar	Shri	3:59
3.	"Bhatki Raaton Ko"	Piyush Mishra	Vivek Sagar	Rahul Ram	3:46
4.	"Aagi Aagi"	Goreti Venkanna	Vivek Sagar	Dake Balaji	4:57
5.	"Rainbows in the Sky"	Shri	Vivek Sagar	Shri	3:39
6.	"Bhola Sa Mann Tha"	Piyush Mishra	Vivek Sagar	Piyush Mishra	5:49
7.	"BabaRag or King of The World"	Streets of Chikkadpally	Vivek Sagar	Streets of Chikkadpally	3:59
Total length:					29:57

== Release ==
The film was exclusively released on 14 February 2024 at Prasads Multiplex in Hyderabad. The film was streamed on ETV Win on 22 February 2024.
