= Chintakindi Mallesham =

Inventor in Andhra Pradesh, India

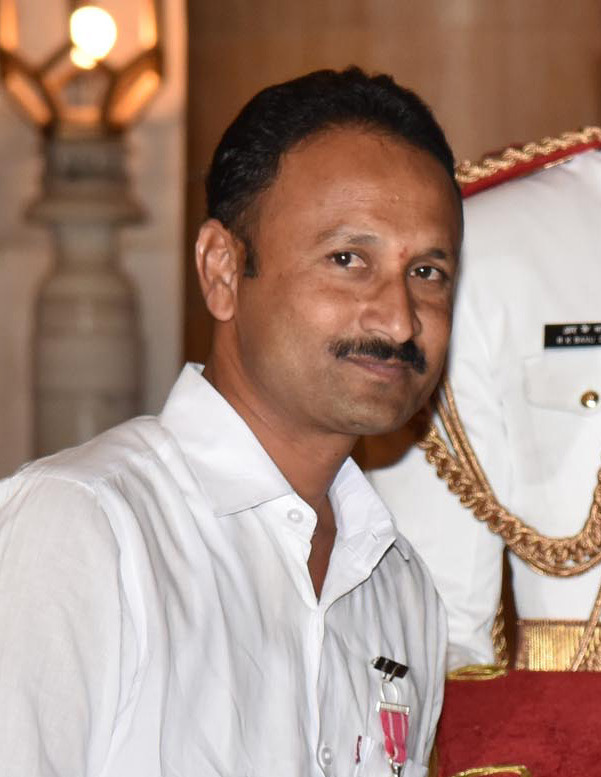
- Born: Sharajpet, Aleru Mandal, Yadadri Bhuvanagiri, Andhra Pradesh (present day Telangana), India
- Occupations: Weaver; Inventor
- Spouse: Swarna
- Parents: Lakshminarayana (father); Lakshmi (mother)

Chintakindi Mallesham (Telugu: చింతకింది మల్లేశం) has been acclaimed for his invention of the Lakshmi Asu machine that reduced the manual effort required by weavers in Pochampally. It has helped reduce the cycle time from around six hours to about ninety minutes. He is a recipient of Padma Shri, the fourth highest civilian award of India for the year 2017. He hails from Sharajpet, Aleru.

== In public media ==
A biopic on his life was released in 2019 and starred Priyadarshi Pulikonda in the lead role with the eponymous title Mallesham.
