= Double Engine (2024 film) =

2024 film by Rohit & Sasi

- Directed by: Rohit Penumatsa
- Written by: Rohit–Sasi
- Produced by: Siddharth Rapalli
- Starring: Muni Myatari; Ajith Kumar; Rohit Narsimha; Raju Shivaratri; Gayathri Gupta; Vishwender Reddy
- Cinematography: Shashank Raghavula
- Edited by: Avanti Ruya
- Music by: Vivek Sagar
- Production company: Waltair Productions
- Release date: 5 January 2024
- Country: India
- Language: Telugu

Double Engine is a 2024 Indian Telugu-language crime thriller film written by Rohit–Sasi and directed by Rohit Penumatsa. Vivek Sagar composed the music for the film. Siddharth Rapalli is the producer of the film, under Waltair Productions banner. The film's primary cast has newcomers. The film was theatrically released on 5 January 2024.

Rohit and Sasi followed a guerrilla method and wrapped up the film in 12 days.

== Plot ==
This is the story of Danny and his friends and their hunt for the double headed snake, aka Double Engine. Danny drives a share auto in Hyderabad. He goes back home to his village for his 21st birthday but the weekend turns out to be a lot more than he expected.

== Cast ==
- Muni Myatari as Danny
- Ajith Kumar as Gopi
- Rohit Narasimha as Narsing
- Raju Shivaratri as Mouli (Snake Charmer)
- Gayathri Gupta as Danny's sister
- Sai Kiran Yadav as Kishore
- Vishwender Reddy as Gopi's Grandfather
- Thanmai Bolt (in Auto Deck Song)
- Camp Sasi as farmhouse owner

== Production ==
The film is set in a rural village, Narayankhed, Telangana; and a few portions of it were shot in Hyderabad city. The film was shot with a guerilla cast and crew and was wrapped up in 12 days. Rohit & Sasi's longtime collaborator Vivek Sagar returned to compose the music of the film. The movie was made under Rs 30 lakhs budget.

== Music ==
Double Engine

Soundtrack album by Vivek Sagar
- Released: 29 March 2023
- Recorded: 2023
- Studio: Tapeloop
- Genre: Feature film soundtrack
- Length: 20:31
- Language: Telugu
- Label: Sony Music India
- Producer: Vivek Sagar

Vivek Sagar chronology
Keedaa Cola (2023)	Double Engine (2023)	Chivaraku Migiledhi (2023)

Vivek Sagar composed the music for Double Engine whose rights were acquired by Sony Music India.

This film has five songs, with lyrics written by Camp Sasi, Niklesh Sunkoji, Jagadeesh Prathap Bandari and Rap by Nikhil Bharadwaj.

Track listing
No.	Title	Lyrics	Artist(s)	Length
1.	"Kadak"	Jagadeesh Prathap Bandari	Jagadeesh Prathap Bandari, Smaran, Nikhil Bharadwaj	3:55
2.	"Palletoori Pillagada"	Camp Sasi	Vivek Sagar	4:48
3.	"Sandeyela"	Niklesh Sunkoji	Partha Sarathy	4:50
4.	"Pailanga"		Sarath Chamer Cobbler	4:32
5.	"Auto Deck"	Instrumental		3:26
Total length:				21:38

== Reception ==
Sangeetha Devi Dundoo of The Hindu wrote that "How Rohit and Sasi narrate this story makes all the difference. Shashank Raghavula’s visuals, with a touch of grunge and realism, give us snapshots of a day in Danny’s life" but added that "In the 105-minute film that comes to speed when the friends begin their hunt for the double-headed snake, there are stretches where nothing seems to happen". The movie was reviewed by Times Now.

== Home media ==
The film streamed on Aha on 29 March 2024.
