= Nikunj Malik =

Indian actress

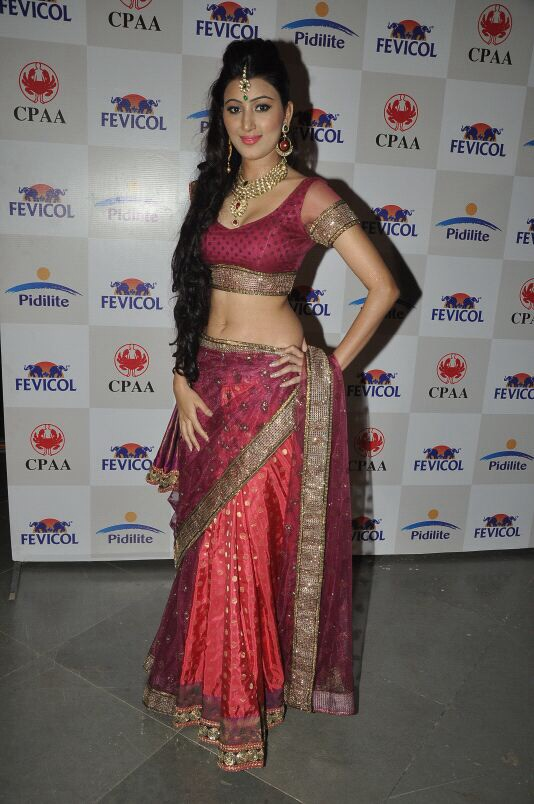
- Malik at Shiana N C's ramp show, 2014
- Born: 30 October 1989 (age 36); Gurgaon, Haryana, India
- Occupations: Actor, footwear designer
- Years active: 2011 – present

Nikunj Malik (born 30 October 1989) is an Indian actress and TV personality.

== Career ==
Malik debuted as a contestant on the Indian reality wedding show, Rahul Dulhaniya le Jayega. The show first aired on NDTV Imagine on 1 February 2011. Although she was one of the most popular contestants, Malik opted out of marriage in the finale episode.

Malik made her film debut with the Bollywood film Revolver Rani alongside Kangana Ranaut. She also made a guest appearance in The Shaukeens.

Nikunj Malik is a graduate and post graduate from the National Institute of Fashion Technology. She specialises in footwear designing. She also cleared IIM-A for doctorate but dropped out.

Malik has endorsed Indian spice brand, R-Pure, and thermal wear brand, Shera.

== Filmography ==
=== Television ===
Year	Serial	Role	Channel
2010	Rahul Dulhaniya Le Jayega	Contestant	NDTV Imagine
2011	Emotional Atyaachar	Self	UTV
2011	Geet – Hui Sabse Parayi	Anwesha "Annie" Singh Khurana	Star One
2012–2013	Ek Hazaaron Mein Meri Behna Hai	Maya	Star Plus
2013	Adaalat	Chanchal	Sony
2013	24	Simran	Sony
2014	Singhasan Battisi	Chitrangada	Star Bharat
2014	SuperCops vs Supervillains	Life OK	
2015	Nadaniyaan	Meghna	Reliance
2015	Sitaron Ki Baat With Nikunj Malik	Presenter	India News
2016	Brahmarakshas	Kiara	Zee TV
2016	Star Sports Pro Kabaddi	Presenter	Star Sports
2017	Prem Ya Paheli – Chandrakanta	Soundarya	Life OK
2018	Kaleerein	Paromita	Zee TV
2019	Sufiyana Pyaar Mera	Sabina Ashraf	Star One
2019–2020	Beyhadh 2	Dr. Diya	Sony
2022	Spy Bahu	Shalini Nanda	Colors

=== Film ===
- Revolver Rani (Debut in 2014)
- The Shaukeens (Guest appearance)
- Meri Pyaari Bindu (Yashraj films)
- Gulmohar (un-released)

== Controversy ==
She stirred controversy when her paternal relatives were arrested for allegedly harassing her mother and threatening to kill her family if she did not quit the entertainment industry. Malik claimed that her mother faced physical assault and death threats from her distant paternal relatives, who were already battling assault, rape, and murder charges in a domestic help case.

== Personal life ==
Nikunj's mother, Shubhalata Malik, is the Ex BJP Chief for the state of Delhi- Slum Cell BJP National executive member.
