= Laxman Aelay =

Indian painter

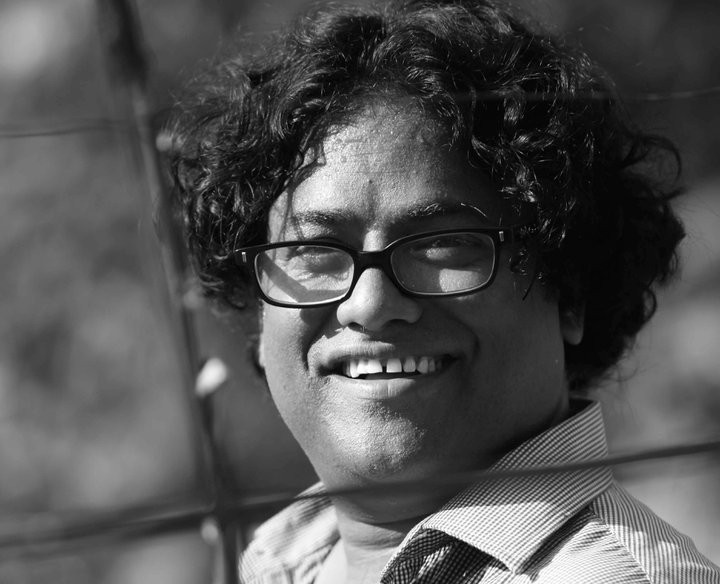
- Born: 8 June 1965 (age 61); Kadirenigudem, Nalgonda district, India
- Known for: Painting

Laxman Aelay (born 8 June 1965) is an Indian painter whose work is inspired by the poverty of people in his village, whom he often depicts against the backdrop of their homes. He has also produced monochromes and hyperrealistic art.

== Early life ==
Aelay was born in Kadirenigudem in Nalgonda district. He received his Bachelor of Fine Arts in Painting and a Master of Fine Arts from the College of Fine Arts at JNAFAU.

== Career ==
At an exhibition in 2006, he created artworks using images captured in Kadirenigudem, sketching on the prints or blending and smudging in Photoshop.

=== Emblem of Telangana ===
He created the Telangana Logo, which contains imagery of both the country and the state of Telangana.

== Awards ==
- 1987: BRONZE MEDAL in the Painting Competition conducted by Amateur Artist Association, Nalgonda, Andhra Pradesh
- 1993: GOLD MEDAL in the Painting Competition conducted by Konaseema Chithrakala Parishath, Amalapuram, Andhra Pradesh
- 1995: Appreciation Award from Hyderabad Art Society at Annual Painting Competition
