= Prince (2022 film) =

2022 film directed by K. V. Anudeep

- Theatrical release poster
- Directed by: K. V. Anudeep
- Screenplay by: S. R. Prabhakaran; Anand Narayanan
- Story by: K. V. Anudeep; Mohan Sato
- Produced by: Suniel Narang; Pushkar Ram Mohan Rao; D. Suresh Babu
- Starring: Sivakarthikeyan; Maria Ryaboshapka; Sathyaraj
- Cinematography: Manoj Paramahamsa
- Edited by: Praveen K. L.
- Music by: Thaman S
- Production companies: Sree Venkateswara Cinemas LLP; Suresh Productions
- Distributed by: Suresh Productions; Gopuram Cinemas
- Release date: 21 October 2022
- Running time: 143 minutes
- Country: India
- Language: Tamil
- Box office: est. ₹ 10 crore

Prince is a 2022 Indian Tamil-language romantic comedy film directed by K. V. Anudeep, who co-wrote the script with Anand Narayanan and Mohan Saro. The film is produced by Sree Venkateswara Cinemas LLP and Suresh Productions. It stars Sivakarthikeyan, alongside Maria Ryaboshapka and Sathyaraj in the lead roles. Premgi Amaren, Subbu Panchu, Sathish Krishnan and VTV Ganesh appear in supporting roles. The film follows Anbu, a teacher from Pondicherry, who falls in love with Jessica, a British teacher at his school, which attracts opposition from some of the town's residents.

The film was officially announced in January 2022 under the tentative title #SK20, as it is Sivakarthikeyan's 20th film as the lead actor, and the official title was announced in June 2022. Principal photography commenced in February 2022. It was shot predominantly in Karaikudi and Pondicherry, and wrapped by late September. The film has music composed by Thaman S, cinematography handled by Manoj Paramahamsa and editing by Praveen K. L.

Prince was released on 21 October 2022. The film received mixed reviews from critics and became a box office bomb.

== Plot ==
Anbarasan (Anbu) is a popular social science teacher at a secondary school in Pondicherry. Anbu, whose father is Ulaganathan, comes from a wealthy and successful family. In Ulaganathan's village, the Indian caste system and religion are the basis of society; Ulaganathan eschews these conventions and encourages other villagers to do the same. Ulaganathan is embarrassed because his daughter married her cousin without his consent; he hopes Anbu will not do the same and makes him sign a document promising not to do so.

Jessica, a British woman born and raised in India, begins working as an English teacher at Anbu's school. Anbu develops a crush on her. Jessica's father, Williams, wants to return to England; Boopathy challenges the ownership of his land and discriminates against Williams, stating he is not Indian. Jessica's student Mahesh scores poorly on a test; the principal is disappointed in Jessica, so Anbu decides to tutor Mahesh, and Mahesh's grade improves. Jessica notices, and she develops a liking for Anbu. Anbu confesses his love for Jessica; she is initially doubtful but soon reciprocates his feelings. Williams takes his case to the police, but it is withdrawn. Anbu tells his parents about Jessica, who meets them. She states she is from the French Colony of Cambridge. Ulaganathan likes Jessica, and Anbu and Jessica are happy.

Anbu starts supporting Williams's case, telling Boopathy to stop, but Williams still dislikes Anbu. Ulaganathan believed Jessica was French, but when he realised she was British, he disapproved of Anbu's relationship with her, mainly because the British killed Ulaganthan's grandfather. At a pub, Anbu and Jessica celebrate Anbu's friend's birthday. They inadvertently start celebrating when the England cricket team defeats the Indian side, and Boopathy believes they are celebrating India's defeat. A fight ensues, and Anbu hits Boopathy's head, which starts bleeding. Williams sees this and realises Anbu is a good man. He invites Anbu for dinner; Anbu learns Williams' family has lived in India for 50 years.

Every year, the school gives Ulaganthan the honour of raising the Indian flag on India's Independence Day. This year, he is not allowed because of Anbu's actions in hitting Boopathy and supporting the British. Ulaganthan wrongly believes Boopathy owns the land. Ulaganathan is angry and waits with some villagers at Williams' house. Ulaganathan confronts Williams, who wants to talk with Ulaganthan in private. When he tries to guide Ulaganathan into his house, the villagers pull on Williams, causing Ulaganthan to fall into the mud. The villagers spread rumours Williams pushed Ulaganathan into the mud. The villagers assemble in front of Williams' house and throw rocks at it.

Williams decides to return to England with his family. Anbu and his friends start fighting the protesting villagers, but they call the police, and the officers take Anbu and his friends away. The villagers exile Anbu from the village for a week. Jessica goes to Ulaganthan's house and tells him the truth. On behalf of the Britishers who ruled India, she apologises for ruling them. Ulaganathan and his wife feel pity for Jessica and her family. Anbu makes a speech and is ejected and says patriotism or humanity. The villagers realise their mistake and let Anbu back in. Anbu catches up with Williams, Jessica and their grandmother, who the police pulled over. They all apologise, and Ulaganthan welcomes them back into the village, promising to treat them respectfully, and accepts Anbu's and Jessica's relationship.

== Cast ==
- Sivakarthikeyan as Anbarasan (Anbu) Anand (In telugu version)
- Maria Ryaboshapka as Jessica
- Sathyaraj as Ulaganathan and Veluchami
- Premgi Amaren as Boopathy
- Subbu Panchu as DRO
- Pramodhini as Aanand's mother
- Carl A. Harte as William Shafton
- Svetlana Grigorashchenko as Jessica's grandmother
- Sabita Roy as abroad guy's wife
- Rethika Srinivas as school principal
- Sathish Krishnan as Anbu's friend
- Prankster Rahul as Anbu's friend
- Finally Bhaarath as Anbu's friend
- VTV Ganesh as Doctor
- Pondy Ravi as SI
- Gnanaprasad as Boopathy's henchman
- Smrudhi as Malar
- Anandha Krishnan as Ulaganathan's son-in-law
- Hari Shankar Nath P as vegetable shop Ganapathy
- Master Shakthi as Mahesh
- Madhavan as a student
- Saathvik as a student
- S. R. Ranjith as a reporter
- Hello Kandasamy as villager
- George Vijay as a villager
- Finally Raj as a villager
- Anandaraj as Inspector Muthupandi (cameo appearance)
- Soori as abroad guy (cameo appearance)
- K. V. Anudeep (cameo appearance)

== Production ==
=== Development ===
In July 2021, K. V. Anudeep, who made his debut that year with Jathi Ratnalu, was reported to join hands with Sivakarthikeyan for his next directorial. Production was reportedly set to begin after the actor completed his commitments to Doctor (2021), Don (2022) and Ayalaan (2024); sources claimed that it would be filmed in both the Telugu and Tamil-languages. On 1 January 2022, the occasion of New Year, the project was officially announced. Tentatively titled SK 20, music composer Thaman S was chosen to compose the score, in his first collaboration with both the actor and director. Producers Suniel Narang, Suresh Babu D and Pushkar Ram Mohan Rao of banners Sree Venkateshwara Cinemas and Suresh Productions were revealed to jointly fund the venture. A muhurat puja was held on 10 February 2022 with the cast and crew. Though many sources reported the film would be a bilingual Tamil and Telugu production, Sivakarthikeyan said it was filmed only in Tamil. In June 2022, it was announced that the film was titled Prince.

=== Casting and filming ===
Sivakarthikeyan reportedly received ₹30 crore (US$3.2 million) as remuneration. In February 2022, Ukrainian actress Maria Ryaboshapka was reported to have been cast in the film. The following month, she was confirmed. Ryaboshapka, despite playing a British woman who teaches English, was not fluent in the language, and memorised her dialogues after converting them to the Ukrainian script.

Principal photography commenced on 10 February 2022 with the first schedule in Karaikudi. The first schedule concluded in March and the same month, the team moved to Pondicherry for the second schedule. Ryaboshapka joined the sets in the second schedule. In May 2022, 90 percent of filming was completed; only a song was left to shoot. The final schedule commenced in May 2022 in Pondicherry. Filming wrapped in late September following some re-shoots.

== Music ==
Prince

Soundtrack album by Thaman S
- Released: 2022
- Recorded: 2021–2022
- Genre: Feature film soundtrack
- Languages: Tamil; Telugu
- Label: Aditya Music
- Producer: Thaman S

Thaman S chronology
Godfather (2022)	Prince (2022)	Varisu (2023)

Singles from Prince
- 1. "Bimbiliki Pilaapi" Released: 1 September 2022; 2. "Jessica" Released: 23 September 2022; 3. "Who Am I?" Released: 14 October 2022

Thaman S composed the music for Prince, it is his first collaboration with Sivakarthikeyan. The first single "Bimbiliki Pilapi" was released on 1 September 2022, the second single "Jessica" was released on 23 September, and the third single "Who Am I?" was released on 14 October.

Tamil
No.	Title	Lyrics	Singer(s)	Length
1.	"Bimbiliki Pilapi"	Vivek	Anirudh Ravichander, Ramya Behara, Sahithi Chaganti	4:29
2.	"Jessica"	Arivu	Thaman S	4:42
3.	"Who Am I?"	Arivu	Arivu	3:59
Total length:				11:10

Telugu
No.	Title	Lyrics	Singer(s)	Length
1.	"Bimbiliki Pilapi"	Ramajogayya Sastry	Ram Miriyala, Ramya Behara, Sahithi Chaganti	4:29
2.	"Jessica"	Ramajogayya Sastry	Thaman S	4:42
3.	"Who Am I?"	Ramajogayya Sastry	Dinker Kalvala	3:59
Total length:				11:10

== Release ==
Prince was released on 21 October 2022, three days before Diwali. It had been planned for release on 31 August that year but the release was postponed. Streaming rights for the film were sold to Disney+ Hotstar, where it began streaming from 25 November 2022.

== Reception ==
Prince received mixed-to-negative reviews from critics. Sakshi Post rated the film 3.25 stars out of 5 and wrote; "Sivakarthikeyan's film is a laugh riot and a total paisa vasool". Kirubhakar Purushothaman of The Indian Express rated the film 2.5 stars out of 5; according to the reviewer; "Director Anudeep's brand of comedy is unique and might not be for everyone". Soundarya Athimuthu of The Quint rated the film 2.5 stars out of 5 stars and wrote: "Prince has interesting elements and does make you laugh at times, but just that it feels like a film that would have worked better had it come a few years back when he was still not the big thing he is today. Unfortunately, he has set his bars high". According to M. Suganth of The Times of India, who rated the film 2 stars out of 5; "Even Sivakarthikeyan, who turns on the comic persona from his early films that made him a star, is only able to just about keep the film from sinking".

Janani K of India Today rated the film 2 stars out of 5 and wrote: "Prince is a madcap comedy that tries to make the audience laugh throughout its runtime. But, you get only occasional laughs in the latter half." Priyanka Sundar of Firstpost rated the film 2 out of 5, calling it a mixed bag and writing; "For those who enjoy the grand comic set-up with momentary payoff, for those who have the patience to relate with such elaborate set up, it is an enjoyable entertainer". Bharathy Singaravel of The News Minute rated the film 1 star out of 5 and wrote; "Romance, comedy or reference to colonial history, Telugu director Anudeep KV's first foray into Kollywood has no grasp of all three". Lakshmi Subramanian of The Week also rated the film 1 star out of 5 and wrote: "Sivakarthikeyan looks good as always. But the actor fails to deliver the laughs that Prince promised." Navein Darshan of Cinema Express gave the film's rating 2.5 stars out of 5 and wrote; "The title Prince doesn't bear much relevance to the actual film, except as a tribute to its star actor". The film failed at the box office and Sivakarthikeyan agreed to compensate distributors who lost money.
