= Boomerang (2019 film) =

2019 film by R. Kannan

- Theatrical release poster
- Directed by: R. Kannan
- Written by: R. Kannan
- Produced by: R. Kannan; M. K. Ramprasad
- Starring: Atharvaa; Megha Akash; Indhuja Ravichandran; Sathish; RJ Balaji; Upen Patel
- Cinematography: Prasanna Kumar
- Edited by: R. K. Selva
- Music by: Radhan
- Production company: Masala Pix
- Distributed by: Trident Arts; M.K.R.P. Productions
- Release date: 8 March 2019
- Running time: 125 minutes
- Country: India
- Language: Tamil

Boomerang is a 2019 Indian Tamil-language film, written, produced, and directed by R. Kannan. The film stars Atharvaa in a dual role, alongside Megha Akash, and Indhuja Ravichandran, while Upen Patel plays an antagonistic role alongside Sathish and RJ Balaji in supporting roles. The music was composed by Radhan with cinematography by Prasanna Kumar and editing by R. K. Selva. The film released on 8 March 2019.

== Plot ==
The movie begins in a hospital, with a patient being rushed to the operation theater. His name is revealed to be Shiva, and his face is not shown. Shiva's face had sustained severe injuries in a fire accident, the doctors think that a face transplant is the only way out to rectify his facial deformities. At the same moment, another patient, Shakthi, is admitted in the same hospital. He is declared brain dead, and the doctors request his mother, Gowri Thiruselvan, to donate his organs. Upon hearing the pleas of Shiva's parents, she relents, and Shakthi's face is transplanted on to Shiva. Shiva, who gets a new lease of life, plans to start a business to take care of his family, unaware of the issues he would be facing in the coming days. Shiva gets attacked twice by some strangers, and he realizes that someone is after his life. Following a third attack, Shiva and his friend Gopal think that the troublemakers could be targeting his face and not him in particular, as not many were aware of his face transplantation surgery. Shiva learns from Gowri that his face donor was not really her son, and another friend reveals that he hailed from a village near Trichy. Shiva travels to Trichy with Gopal and his girlfriend Gigi to enquire about Shakthi. Parallelly, it is revealed that Gigi had rejected Shiva earlier (owing to not liking his looks prior to surgery), and during the train journey, Siva reveals his true identity. Gigi feels guilty and asks for his forgiveness, after which the two reconcile.

In Trichy, Shiva and Gopal go about trying to find out more about Shakthi, when yet another attempt is made on Shiva's life. He chases the perpetrators by car, but accidentally knocks down a person on the road. Out of guilt, Shiva admits the person in a hospital, and there they meet Maya, who narrates Shakthi's life to them and reveals why people are after Shiva. Shakthi, along with his friend Shanmugam and Maya, used to work for a multinational company. Due to some internal conflicts, the three lose their jobs, along with many others. Shakthi gets frustrated and decides to go back to his village and do farming instead of continuing in the IT industry. Initially, Shakthi and his friends face resistance in the form of the local councilor Mayilvaganam , who insisted that all farmers sell their lands to him for money instead of continuing agriculture. He even instigates Shakthi's father against his own son. In a public meeting with the villagers, Shakthi, Shanmugam, and Maya convince the villagers to help them unite a dry river in their village, with an overflowing river in a village 20 km away, by building a canal. They reason that the other river has a surplus amount of water and often floods that village during monsoon, and the idea is to use the excess water by means of the canal for farming.

The villagers, pleased with the idea, offer their support to Shakthi. The three friends initially face tough challenges in the form the government officials and even the local police, but overcoming all struggles with the villagers' support, the trio protest in front of the district collector's office to obtain permission for constructing the canal. Things go awry when two goons enter the crowd in disguise and incite violence, thus forcing the police to charge on them. Initially miffed about the nuisance, the collector argues, but after hearing out Shakthi and his friends, he relents and gives permission. The canal construction works begin in full earnest. One day, a sudden landslide occurs, and in a bid to escape, a lot of people get buried underneath and lose their lives, including Shanmugam.

In the present day, Maya reveals that she never heard of Shakthi after that. She also tells that Shakthi felt very guilty of indirectly causing so much life loss. Intrigued, Shiva requests Maya to tell more about the river interlinking project that they worked on. Shakthi's laptop is locked, and upon seeing a face recognition option, Shiva unlocks it using his newly obtained face. The laptop contains details about various people supporting Shakthi and his friends in the initiative, including residents of that neighboring village. It also contains an unsent mail addressed to Maya. In an attached video, Shakthi in his final moments; tells that Maya needs to know certain truths. Shakti found that a bomb had actually triggered the landslide from a device that Shanmugam latched on to before his death. He rushes to the Sub-Inspector and urges him to take action.

The Sub-Inspector turns out to be a traitor and takes Shakthi to Sooraj. It is revealed that Sooraj caused Shakthi and his friends to lose their jobs and also face all the trouble in the village. The goons at the collector's office too, are revealed to be henchmen sent by Sooraj, who even has Mailvaganam on his payroll. Sooraj wanted to privatize the electricity supply to the region and hence, caused so much trouble. In the ensuing fight, the Sub-Inspector gets killed, while Shakthi gets grievously injured on the head but somehow escapes from Sooraj before the latter could kill him. While escaping in a lorry, Shakthi records the video and attempts to send it to Maya. Shiva is emotionally touched by Shakthi's story and decides to avenge his death by killing Sooraj. At this juncture, it is revealed that the person knocked down by Shiva is none other than Sooraj himself, who realized that the person who saved him is not Shakthi, as Shakthi would never have done so. Sooraj tells Shiva that he will instruct his henchmen to stand down, and Shiva can go live a happy life. But Shiva is not interested in helping Sooraj anymore. During their train journey, Gigi tells Shiva about a drug that, when administered into a person, causes excessive adrenaline rush, eventually leading to death by loss of breath, while leaving no traces in the blood. Shiva uses this drug to kill Sooraj, thus avenging Shakthi's death. In the final scene, Shiva is shown getting down from a bus to go to Shakthi's village, presumably to continue Shakti's unfinished work.

== Cast ==
- Atharvaa in a dual role:
  - Shiva (Face Transplant)
  - Shakthi
- Megha Akash as Gigi, Shiva's girlfriend
- Indhuja Ravichandran as Maya, Shakthi and Shanmugam's colleague
- Sathish as Gopal, Shiva's friend
- RJ Balaji as Shanmugam, Shakthi's friend
- Upen Patel as Sooraj, a ruthless businessman
- Ravi Mariya as Councillor Mailvaganam
- Rajendran as Film Producer
- Ramkumar Ganesan as Akash, a channel owner
- Malavika Avinash as Shiva's mother
- Jeeva Ravi as Shiva's father
- Shankar Sundaram as Shakthi's father
- Suhasini Maniratnam as Gowri Thiruselvan
- E. Ramdoss as Sub-Inspector Rajan
- Vinodhini Vaidyanathan as Doctor
- Dheshika Jagannathan as Shiva's sister
- Jenni as Shakthi's friend
- Mayilsamy
- Sampath Ram as Inspector
- Supergood Subramani as Short Film Actor
- Giri Dwarakish as Village Officer
- Stunt Silva as henchman sent by Sooraj to kill Shiva/Shakthi
- Raja Elangovan
- Master Arjun Kannan
- Baby Laya Kannan
- Raandilya as Rowdy
- Mahendran as himself, Judge of a short film contest
- G. Dhananjayan as himself, Judge of a short film contest
- Narayan Lucky as himself, a cameo appearance

== Production ==
R. Kannan announced that he would direct and produce a new film starring Atharvaa in the lead role during October 2017. Megha Akash was signed on to portray the female lead actress, while Upen Patel was selected as the film's antagonist. For a particular look in the film, Atharvaa had to wear heavy prosthetic make-up with designers Preetisheel Singh and Mark Troy D’Souza assisting with the makeover.

The film was 90% completed by March 2018, before production was delayed as a result of an industry-wide strike the following month. The film was mainly shot for 45 days in and around Chennai, Aruppukottai, Virudhunagar and Theni, with a duet song shot in the Andaman Islands, before coming to a close in June 2018.

== Themes and influences ==
The idea of a face transplant and taking up the responsibility given by the new identity was taken from Yevadu (2014) while the agricultural aspect was taken from Kaththi (also 2014).

== Soundtrack ==
This music is composed by Radhan and released by Sony Music India.

Boomerang

Soundtrack album by Radhan
- Released: 2019
- Venue: Chennai
- Studio: Masala Pix
- Genre: Feature film soundtrack
- Length: 20:10
- Language: Tamil
- Label: Sony Music India
- Producer: Radhan

Radhan chronology
Hushaaru (2018)	Boomerang (2019)	RDX Love (2019)
External audio
- Official Audio Jukebox on YouTube

No.	Title	Lyrics	Singer(s)	Length
1.	"Mughaiyazhi"	Vivek	Anand Aravindakshan, Radhika Narayanan	03:10
2.	"Desame"	Vivek	Jithin Raj	04:50
3.	"Vaan Thodave"	Radhan	Bobo Shashi	04:30
4.	"Mughaiyazhi (Instrumental Version)"	Vivek	Bobo Shashi	03:10
Total length:				16:00

== Release and reception ==
Boomerang was released on 8 March 2019 Film Companion South wrote, "What promised to be pulpy fun, with the face swap, turns into a dully earnest story about river-linking. If we are going to continue to thrust serious issues into masala narratives, can we at least have better writing and filmmaking?".

The satellite rights of the film were sold to Zee Tamil and were premiered on April 14, 2019, a month after the film's theatrical release.
