= First Day First Show =

Indian Telugu-language comedy film

- Theatrical release poster
- Directed by: Vamshidhar Goud; Lakshminarayana Puttamchetty
- Story by: K. V. Anudeep
- Produced by: Srija Edida; Sriram Edida
- Starring: Srikanth Reddy; Sanchita Bashu; Tanikella Bharani; Vennela Kishore; Srinivasa Reddy; C. V. L. Narasimha Rao; Prabhas Sreenu
- Cinematography: Prasanth Ankireddy
- Edited by: Gullapalli Sambasivarao
- Music by: Radhan
- Production companies: Poornodaya Pictures; Srija Entertainments; Mitravinda Movies
- Release date: 2 September 2022
- Country: India
- Language: Telugu

First Day First Show is a 2022 Indian Telugu-language comedy film directed by Vamshidhar Goud and Lakshminarayana Puttamchetty. The story was written by K. V. Anudeep. The film stars Srikanth Reddy, Sanchita Basu, Tanikella Bharani, Vennela Kishore, Srinivasa Reddy, C. V. L. Narasimha Rao, Prabhas Sreenu, Mahesh Achanta, Vamshidhar Goud, and Sai Charan Bojja.

== Plot ==
Set in 2001, 18-year old Sreenu is a hardcore Pawan Kalyan fan who never misses watching all his films on the first day first show, which irritates his father Dharmaraju. When Pawan Kalyan's new film Kushi is about to release, Sreenu's love-interest Laya asks him for movie tickets of first day first show and whether or not Sreenu succeeds in getting those tickets amid heavy competition forms the rest of the story.

== Cast ==
- Srikanth Reddy as Sreenu (Note: Not to be confused with Srikanth Reddy)
- Sanchita Basu as Laya
- Tanikella Bharani as Dharmaraju, Sreenu’s father
- Vennela Kishore as Ravi anna
- Srinivasa Reddy as Head Constable Sathish
- C. V. L. Narasimha Rao as Dharmaraju’s friend
- Prabhas Sreenu as Reel Distributor
- Gangavva as Gangavva
- Mahesh Achanta as Mahesh
- Vamshidhar Goud as Ramesh
- Sai Charan Bojja as Raghu, Sreenu’s friend
- Ramani Chowdary as Laya’s mother
- K. V. Anudeep as Sangamesh (Cameo Appearance)

== Music ==
First Day First Show

Soundtrack album by Radhan
- Released: 2022
- Genre: Feature film soundtrack
- Length: 14:08
- Language: Telugu
- Label: Aditya Music

Radhan chronology
Sila Nerangalil Sila Manidhargal (2022)	First Day First Show (2022)	Miss Shetty Mr Polishetty (2023)
External audio
- First Day First Show – Jukebox on YouTube

The music was composed by Radhan.

Track listing
No.	Title	Lyrics	Singer(s)	Length
1.	"Mazza Mazza"	Vamshidhar Goud, Vasu Valaboju	Anthony Daasan, Sarath Santosh	4:20
2.	"Nee Navvey"	Ramajogayya Sastry	Ram Miriyala	3:25
3.	"O Laya"	Vamshidhar Goud	Sarath Santosh	2:32
4.	"Maro Masthi Maro"	Vamshidhar Goud	Sarath Santosh	1:30
5.	"Ode To Cinema"	Vamshidhar Goud	S. P. Charan	2:21
Total length:				14:08

== Release ==
First Day First Show was released theatrically on 2 September 2022. The digital streaming rights of the film were acquired by Aha, and the film premiered on 23 September 2022.

=== Critical reception ===
The film received negative reviews.

Banda Kalyan of Samayam Telugu rated the film 2.5/5 stars. Paul Nicodemus of The Times of India gave the film 2/5 stars and wrote, "First Day First Show, which opened to high expectations, feels like an overstretch of a thin storyline. It invokes nostalgia from the 90s and early Y2K and might appeal to hardcore Pawan Kalyan fans but otherwise fails to deliver."

A critic from Telugucinema.com rated the film 1/5 and wrote, "First Day First Show begins bland and stays bland with no logic and rhyme. You cannot sit through it after the interval." G. Gowtham of India Herald wrote, "The editing and writing are poor. What happens when a concept good for a short film is expanded into a full film lasting two hours? First Day First Show is the response." A critic from Eenadu noted the film's stretchy narrative was a drawback, though it had some funny moments.
