= Pushpdeep Bhardwaj =

Indian film director

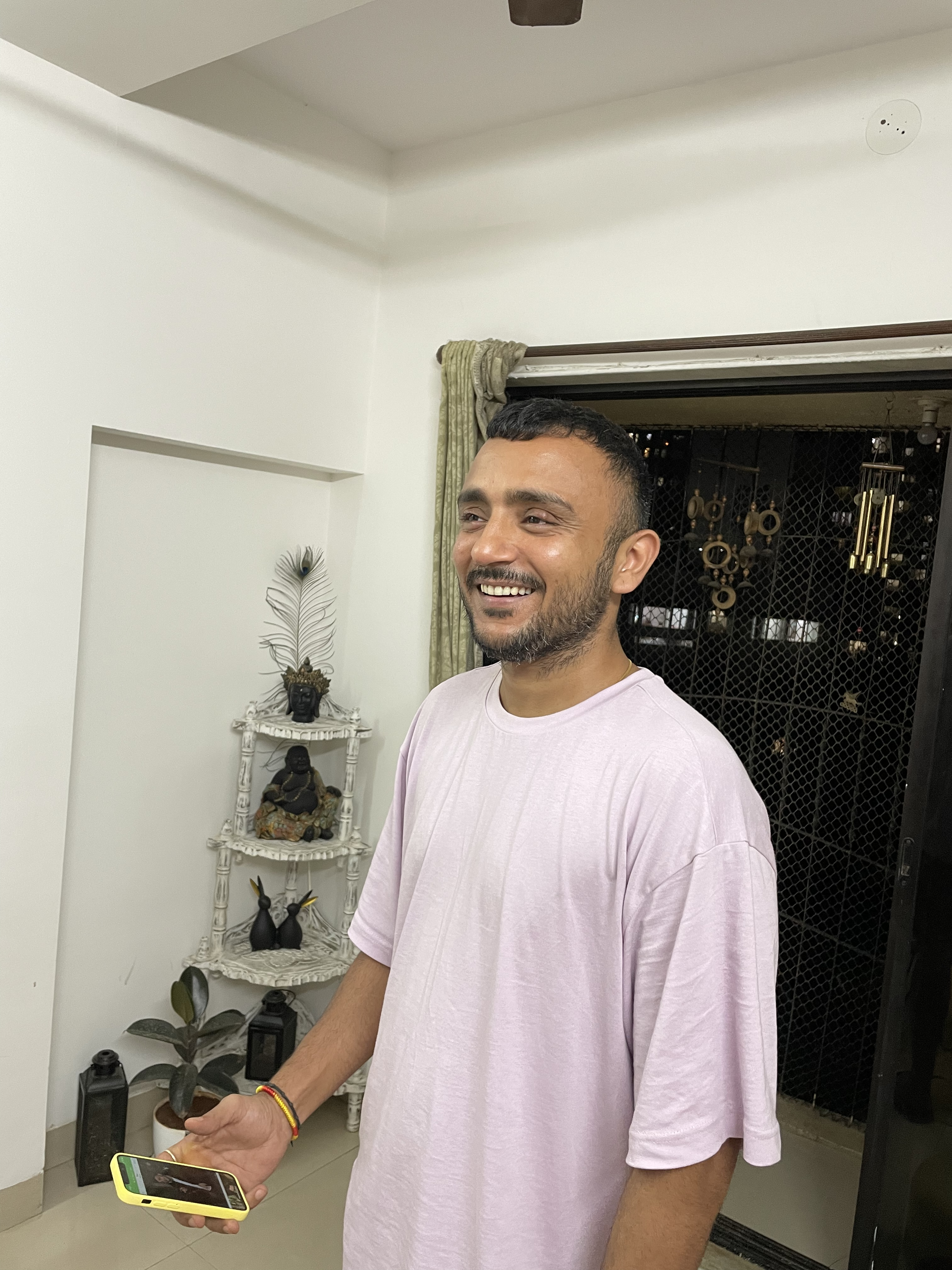
- Bhardwaj in 2023
- Born: Pushpdeep Bhardwaj Rattan; Delhi, India
- Occupation: Film director
- Years active: 2018–present

Pushpdeep Bhardwaj is an Indian film director and writer. He is mainly known for his work in Hindi Film Industry. He made his directing debut with his film Jalebi starring Rhea Chakraborty, Varun Mitra and Digangana Suryavanshi.

== Early life ==
Bhardwaj was born in Delhi. He is a graduate from National Institute of Fashion Technology. After completing his study in NIFT, he started the job of visual merchandising in Reliance but he left the job for films. Later he contributed in several acting workshops as an instructor. He was also associated with theatre in Delhi.

== Career ==
In his early days, Bhardwaj directed and acted in various short films.

In 2018, He made his debut as a director and writer in Hindi Film Industry with the musical romantic drama film Jalebi produced by Vishesh Films.

In 2020, he wrote the additional dialogues of the Mahesh Bhatt directed action thriller film Sadak 2.

In 2022, Bhardwaj written and directed the web-series Ranjish He Sahi.

== Filmography ==
Year	Movie/Web-series	Credits	Notes
2018	Jalebi	Writer and Director	Debut film
2020	Sadak 2	Additional dialogues writer	
2022	Ranjish He Sahi	Writer and Director	
