= Jalebi (film) =

2018 film directed by Pushpdeep Bhardwaj

Jalebi: The Everlasting Taste of Love
- Theatrical release poster
- Directed by: Pushpdeep Bhardwaj
- Based on: Praktan; Pushpdeep Bhardwaj
- Produced by: Mukesh Bhatt; Mahesh Bhatt; Sakshi Bhatt
- Starring: Varun Mitra; Digangana Suryavanshi; Rhea Chakraborty
- Cinematography: Manoj Soni
- Edited by: Devendra Murdeshwar
- Music by: Jeet Gannguli; Tanishk Bagchi; Javed - Mohsin; Abhishek Mishra; Samuel-Akanksha
- Production company: Vishesh Films
- Distributed by: Viacom18 Motion Pictures
- Release date: 12 October 2018
- Running time: 112 minutes
- Country: India
- Language: Hindi
- Box office: ₹24.1 million

Jalebi (also known as Jalebi: The Everlasting Taste of Love) is a 2018 Indian Hindi-language musical romantic drama film directed by Pushpdeep Bhardwaj. It's a remake of the 2016 Bengali language film Praktan. It stars newcomers Varun Mitra, Digangana Suryavanshi and Rhea Chakraborty.

== Plot ==
Aisha (Rhea Chakraborty) is a budding writer and an independent, progressive woman from Mumbai who visits Delhi with her friend to research for her upcoming book. She meets a local guide, Dev (Varun Mitra), and falls in love with him. She later proposes to him, and they get married. After a few months, Aisha learns that she is pregnant. Dev is extremely happy, but Aisha is reluctant as she feels she isn't ready for motherhood. Dev convinces her, and they both settle into happiness, feeling that they might have a baby girl whom they will name Disha, a portmanteau of Dev and Aisha's names.

Unfortunately, Aisha has a miscarriage and Dev's mother blames Aisha for it. Aisha feels humiliated and leaves Dev. A few days later, Dev and his family try to bring her back, but she doesn't return. She asks Dev to meet her in Kashmir if he really loves her, but Dev does not come.

Seven years later, Aisha calls off her second wedding as she is still in love with Dev. She decides to face her problems and travels to Delhi. On her way, she meets a woman named Anu and her daughter, Pulti, and discovers that Anu is Dev's second wife. She also meets Dev on the same train. During the journey, she reminisces about her marriage to him. She also finds out that Pulti's given name is Disha, and feels upset, chiding Dev for naming her that. Anu reveals that Pulti is not Dev's child and was sired by Anu's boyfriend. Dev lifted at the very next moment he saw Pulti, and before marriage, he had a single condition that she should be named Disha.

The train reaches Dev's station. While leaving, Anu thanks Aisha for giving her Dev and tells her that she knows that Aisha is Dev's love and first wife. Dev disembarks the train, but Anu encourages Dev to reveal the truth to Aisha that he had come to meet her that day in Kashmir, but realised that she wouldn't be happy with him. His world is different from hers, and he wanted to see her living her life happily and fulfilling her dreams. He reveals that it was because of this that he hurried through their divorce proceedings and appeared as a bad person before her. He also tells her that he has read her novel many times. Both cry and hug each other. She says that although their destinations are different, their love remains intact. Dev tells Aisha that he will wait for her next novel, and they part ways to live two different lives and two different destinies.

A year later, Dev finds Aisha's new book named Jalebi, which is an account of their love story.

== Cast ==
- Varun Mitra as Dev Mathur, Aisha's ex-husband and Anu's husband
- Digangana Suryavanshi as Anu Mathur, Dev's second wife
- Rhea Chakraborty as Aisha Pradhan, Dev's first wife
- Aanya Dureja as Disha 'Pulti' Mathur, Dev's adoptive daughter
- Poorti Arya as Renu Mathur, Dev's sister
- Praveena Deshpande as Kamla Mathur, Dev's mother
- Mahesh Thakur as Mr. Pradhan, Aisha's father
- Priya Yadav as Anaina, Aisha's friend
- Sonali Sudan as Mrs. Singh
- Jashn Kohli as Sunny Singh
- Shabnam Kapoor as Mrs. Singh's Mother
- Farida Dadi as old passenger in train
- Yusuf Hussain as old passenger in train
- Arjun Kanungo as himself
- Sanchay Goswami as Arjun's friend
- Chayan Trivedi as T.T.E
- Abhishek Khanna as J.P. Mishra, Coach Attendant

== Marketing ==
The first look of the movie was released on 3 September 2018.

The poster in which the lead pair is seen engaged in a passionate kiss through the window of a train is a clear reflection of the 1950 photograph by Frank Brown. The iconic photograph basically symbolised the distress wrought by the Korean War.

The official trailer for the film was released on 10 September 2018.

== Soundtrack ==
Jalebi

Soundtrack album by Jeet Gannguli, Tanishk Bagchi, Javed - Mohsin, Abhishek Mishra and Samuel-Akanksha
- Released: 21 September 2018
- Recorded: 2018
- Genre: Feature film soundtrack
- Length: 39:28
- Language: Hindi
- Label: Sony Music India

Singles from Jalebi
- 1. "Tum Se" Released: 10 September 2018; 2. "Pal" Released: 14 September 2018; 3. "Tera Mera Rishta" Released: 28 September 2018; 4. "Mera Pyaar Tera Pyaar" Released: 4 October 2018

Jeet Gannguli chronology
Parmanu: The Story of Pokhran (2018)	Jalebi (2018)	Bhaiaji Superhit (2018)

Tanishk Bagchi chronology
Loveyatri (2018)	Jalebi (2018)	Badhaai Ho (2018)

Javed - Mohsin chronology
Munna Michael (2017)	Jalebi (2018)	Drive (2019)

The film's soundtrack was released on 21 September 2018. Jeet Gannguli, Tanishk Bagchi, Javed-Mohsin, Abhishek Mishra and Samuel–Akanksha composed the soundtrack of the film. Music Produced By Dj Phukan, Samuel Shetty & Akanksha Nandrekar, Chandan Saxena, Krishna Kishore. The lyrics are written by Rashmi Virag, Prashant Ingole, Manoj Kumarnath, Arafat Mehmood and Kunaal Vermaa.

Track listing
No.	Title	Lyrics	Music	Artist(s)	Length
1.	"Tum Se"	Manoj Kumarnath	Samuel–Akanksha	Jubin Nautiyal	4:16
2.	"Pal"	Prashant Ingole, Kunaal Vermaa	Javed-Mohsin	Arijit Singh, Shreya Ghoshal	4:07
3.	"Mera Pyaar Tera Pyaar"	Rashmi Virag	Jeet Gannguli	Arijit Singh	4:35
4.	"Mujhme"	Arafat Mehmood	Samuel–Akanksha	Shilpa Rao	3:05
5.	"Tera Mera Rishta"	Arafat Mehmood	Tanishk Bagchi	K.K, Shreya Ghoshal	4:53
6.	"Pehle Ke Jaisa"	Rashmi Virag	Abhishek Mishra	K.K	4:32
7.	"Tera Mera Rishta" (Solo)	Arafat Mehmood	Tanishk Bagchi	K.K	4:53
8.	"Tum Se Adlib"	Manoj Kumarnath	Samuel-Akanksha	Jubin Nautiyal	2:26
9.	"Tum Se Adlib" (Female Version)	Manoj Kumarnath	Samuel-Akanksha	Shilpa Rao	2:33
10.	"Pal" (Female Version)	Prashant Ingole, Kunaal Vermaa	Javed - Mohsin	Shreya Ghoshal	4:08
Total length:					39:28

Extended remix
No.	Title	Lyrics	Music	Artist(s)	Length
11.	"Pal" (Remix by DJ Amit B)	Prashant Ingole, Kunaal Vermaa	Javed - Mohsin	Arijit Singh, Shreya Ghoshal	4:36
12.	"Tum Se" (Remix by Aqeel Ali)	Manoj Kumarnath	Samuel-Akanksha	Jubin Nautiyal	2:50
