= Funky (film) =

2026 Indian Telugu-language film

- Theatrical release poster
- Directed by: K. V. Anudeep
- Written by: K. V. Anudeep; Mohan Sato
- Produced by: Naga Vamsi S; Sai Soujanya
- Starring: Vishwak Sen; Kayadu Lohar
- Cinematography: Suresh Sarangam
- Edited by: Naveen Nooli
- Music by: Bheems Ceciroleo
- Production companies: Sithara Entertainments; Fortune Four Cinemas; Srikara Studios
- Release date: 13 February 2026
- Running time: 128 minutes
- Country: India
- Language: Telugu
- Budget: ₹25 crore
- Box office: ₹13.50 crore

Funky is a 2026 Indian Telugu-language comedy drama film co-written and directed by K. V. Anudeep. The film was produced by Naga Vamsi S. and Sai Soujanya under Sithara Entertainments and Fortune Four Cinemas. The film stars Vishwak Sen and Kayadu Lohar.

Funky was theatrically released on 13 February 2026 to negative reviews from critics and audiences. It was a commercial failure at the box office.

== Plot ==
Producer Sudharsan watches a partially completed version of the film Funky, which he produced under his banner Manchi Studio, in a private screening with his assistant Balaji. Balaji informs Sudharsan that the uncompleted film itself cost around ₹40 crores. Sudharsan learns that Balaji had sold some of Sudharsan's properties to finish the schedules. Upon hearing this, Sudharsan asks Balaji why Komal quoted only four crores as the budget for the whole film, but now forty crores have been spent as Komal kept increasing the budget for filming song portions and fight sequences. Balaji also informs him that Komal has asked for an additional four crores to finish the remaining schedules. Sudharsan suffers a heart attack and is admitted to a hospital, where he gets a stent and is slowly recovering. Sudharsan's daughter Chitra visits him and learns that the debutant director Komal is the reason behind her father's health condition, and that filming was halted because Komal stopped the shooting over a tender coconut not having coconut inside the shell. Sudharsan and Balaji tell her what a nuisance he is.

Komal's mother and younger sister visit him to inform him that there is a potential marriage alliance for his sister and he should join the ceremony. But he says he'd feel weird if someone marries his sister and he had to call him "brother-in-law" and his brother-in-law's father "uncle" - all of it feels weird to him, which makes his sister angry and she leaves with their mother saying she doesn't care whether he attends or not. Later, Chitra tries to replace Komal with another director who could finish the remaining portions with a low budget. Komal persistently tries to convince Chitra, and she eventually agrees as he accepts to finish it with a one-crore budget for the remaining schedules.

As Komal discusses with his assistant directors, he notices RK, the financier GK's brother, talking with Chitra about the pending loan repayments, but Komal mistakes it and beats RK, believing he asked her for sexual companionship. Eventually, RK explains the situation and takes Komal to GK, where he learns GK is a fan of Jr. NTR, so he convinces him, saying he will get him passes for the pre-release event of Jr. NTR's upcoming film, which GK agrees to happily. Later, Chitra invites Komal to a party they have arranged to announce that the studio still makes films even after working with such a director, where he gets drunk and she drops him off at his house. Komal's landlady shouts, asking for four months' pending rent, and Chitra helps him pay the rent; out of gratitude, he hugs her.

When Chitra, Komal, and his assistants visit Komal's village to look for a shooting location, she learns about his childhood friends and how emotionally detached he is from his mother and sister. Although she is initially hesitant, she gets along with Komal. Later, Komal thanks her for dropping him off at his house and for believing in his script when her father would not give him a chance. She was the one who convinced her dad, back when Komal was just a beginner.

On the day of the pre-release event of Jr. NTR's upcoming film, GK phones Komal and Komal promises he'll make sure GK and his family meet Jr. NTR. But when GK visits the entrance with his family, Komal is not there, and as other people try to enter, falsely saying they are GK, the guards block the path and one of them slaps GK in anger. Meanwhile, Komal visits Chitra at a film festival; she had invited him there. While watching the film, she tells him that all the romantic scenes he told her about are in the film they are watching, so she asks him to write something original. The next day, he narrates a love proposal scene he originally wrote the night before. It is about a hero and heroine who want to express their feelings but do not know how, so they are just talking random things while trying to propose to each other. For example, the hero says, "Girls topped tenth standard again." The heroine replies, "Gold prices have gone up drastically." Then the hero responds, "There's huge traffic near tolls during Sankranti." Chitra interrupts him and says, "Does she say, There's a new director who doesn't pay at food joints?" and asks him to stick to copying rather than writing something like this.

At the shooting spot, Komal asks Chitra to listen to the audios he shared, hoping to express his feelings through audio, but she clicks on one of the files and it plays a recording where Komal jokingly accuses Chitra, to his assistants, of losing all the money in her startup and going bankrupt, so she blamed Komal by playing the sympathy card of her sick father, and they got all the attention they needed from the industry. Later, when she walks out of the caravan, one of the vehicles her father left a few seconds earlier explodes, and GK threatens them, saying he will not let them complete the film because Komal is the reason he was humiliated in front of his family.

Sudharsan and Chitra file a complaint at the police station explaining the situation, and they want Komal to be arrested. But Komal manages the predicament by convincing the police officer to play the role of a watchman in his film, and the officer arrests GK instead. Angered by the predicaments he has caused, Chitra tries to complete the film without Komal, but he uploads a video on YouTube portraying himself as innocent, and without other options, she reluctantly agrees to take Komal to the location.

Changed from his previous attitude, Komal cuts the budget by luring his school and college friends into working as junior artists for free. At one point, he injures his hand to save Chitra from a falling set prop, which eases the anger she had towards him. Later, she plays the audio file he mentioned earlier and hears him saying he likes her. While discussing daily expenses for the schedule, he overhears Chitra telling her father on the phone that she did not meet the guy her father asked her to see. Curiously, Komal asks why she did not meet the guy. She says he is her dad's friend and it has been three months since he spoke to his father, that is why she did not meet him – she thinks that guy has no values for his family. To impress her, Komal pretends like he is a guy who values his family and attends his sister's engagement.

GK, released from prison, visits his house only to find his family members are offered acting roles by Komal – because of that, they did not even care to see GK. A devastated GK plans revenge against Komal for separating his family members from him. At one of the schedules, Chitra notices Komal teaching dialogues to the hero and heroine, saying, "It all feels weird – if we marry tomorrow, your father will call me son-in-law. And your brother calling me brother-in-law makes it even weirder. [...] All these unnecessary relations, formal handovers, pranks – it all feels weird. [...] I can’t live in this family box! It's weird." After wrapping up the film, he proposes to Chitra, but she rejects, saying the same dialogues he wrote about family relations, calling it weird.

Although he is not attached to his family, he invites Chitra to his sister's wedding – at first she says she will not attend, but later gets the address from him by phone. At his sister's wedding, he tries to impress Chitra by pretending he is the one who took care of all the necessary arrangements. When everyone says emotional words to his sister after the marriage, he finds it weird. And when his sister, crying emotionally, comes near to say bye, he simply replies "pass" to everyone's shock. After everyone left, Komal reconnects with his mother and asks her to stay with him in the city. To avenge Komal, GK steals the hard disk and tells him he has no intention of returning it, but Komal convinces him by reuniting him with his family members and adding a special thanks card and photos of GK along with his family.

In the end, Chitra tries to express her feelings to Komal. Komal and Chitra talk about random things. He says, "Girls topped tenth standard again." She replies, "Gold prices have gone up drastically." Then he responds, "There's huge traffic near toll booths during Sankranti." She says, "There's a new director who doesn't pay at food joints." And they express their love for each other. She adds he is the one who spoiled everything whenever she tried to propose to him. She asks him what is next; he says another film. And he promises he would only make budget-constraint films since this is now his home banner. Later, it shows Komal, Chitra, and Sudharsan celebrating the success of Funky at the success meet.

== Cast ==
- Vishwak Sen as Komal, The Director
- Kayadu Lohar as Chitra, The Producer
- Naresh as Sudharsan, Chitra's Father
- Easwari Rao as Subhadra, Komal's mother
- Sampath Raj as GK
- Raghu Babu
- Jai Krishna
- Ravi Anthony Pudota as GK's brother
- Rajitha as Sudharsan's sister
- Manik Reddy as a doctor
- Muralidhar Goud as family doctor
- Pammi Sai as Balaji
- Sunitha Manohar as house owner
- Mahender Peddagalla as Komal's friend
- Achuth Nandha Jv as Komal's friend
- Hari Shankar Nath P as SI C. Krishna Murthy
- Pawan Bolisetty as assistant director
- Mahipal
- Muppuri Raghava Ram as assistant director
- Aditi Bhavaraju as Komal's sister
- Yash Puri as the lead actor

Cameo appearances

- K. V. Anudeep as Komal's friend
- Kalyan Shankar as Komal's friend
- Naga Vamsi S as himself
- Harish Shankar as himself
- Dil Raju as himself

== Production ==
In August 2024, it was reported that Vishwak Sen and director K. V. Anudeep were collaborating on an untitled comedy film, with Bheems Ceciroleo as music composer and Suresh Sarangam as cinematographer. The film was written by K. V. Anudeep and Mohan Sato. The title, Funky, was announced on 11 December 2024, and a muhurat puja ceremony was held in Hyderabad, with Nag Ashwin accompanying Anudeep for the clapperboard shot. In February 2025, it was reported that Kayadu Lohar joined the cast. In October 2025, the makers officially confirmed Kayadu Lohar as the female lead, playing the role of Chitra. K. V. Anudeep and Mohan Sato improvised dialogues on set. Anudeep drew inspiration for some sequences in the film from real-life incidents in the film industry. He had Vishwak Sen in mind for the lead role while writing the script. The film was loosely based on the real-life love story of director Nag Ashwin and producer Priyanka Dutt during the production of their first collaboration, the 2015 film Yevade Subramanyam.

== Music ==
The music was composed by Bheems Ceciroleo. The first single, "Dheere Dheere", was released on 24 December 2025. The second single, "Rattatataav", was released on 31 January 2026. The third single, "Yama Yamma", was released on 9 February 2026.

Track listing
No.	Title	Lyrics	Singer(s)	Length
1.	"Dheere Dheere"	K. V. Anudeep	Sanjith Hegde, Rohini Soratt	4:17
2.	"Rattatataav"	Dev Pawar	Ram Miriyala	3:37
3.	"Yama Yamma"	Dev Pawar	Bheems Ceciroleo, Rohini Sorrat	3:50
4.	"Chandamama"	Dev Pawar	Eswar Dathu	2:35
Total length:				14:19

== Release ==
Funky was released theatrically on 13 February 2026. Initially, the makers planned to release it on 25 December 2025; however, they postponed it and rescheduled it for April 2026 before confirming the February release.

Funky was released on Netflix on 13 March 2026 with its original Telugu version, along with dubbed versions in Tamil, Kannada, Malayalam, and the Hindi version, titled Mazzaq.

== Reception ==
Suhas Sistu of The Hans India rated the film 3/5 stars and wrote, "Funky works best when viewed as a stress-free entertainer rather than a layered narrative. It doesn’t aim for depth or complexity, but instead focuses on delivering simple fun, humour, and theatrical enjoyment." Yashaswini Sri of The Indian Express rated the film 2.5/5 stars and wrote, "The Vishwak Sen-starrer squanders its potential with misfired jokes, poor editing, and a narrative that lacks clear direction." Shreya Varanasi of The Times of India rated the film 2.5/5 stars and wrote, "The film often feels like a compilation of skits rather than a smoothly flowing narrative. [...] It has its moments but struggles with consistency." Jalapathi Gudelli of Telugucinema.com rated the film 2.25/5 stars and wrote, "Despite carrying Anudeep’s trademark humor and despite some jokes genuinely working, the film feels aimless. The narrative drifts without a binding emotional thread."

Avad Mohammad of OTTPlay rated the film 2/5 stars and wrote, "On the whole, Funky is a silly, over-the-top comedy that offers only a few genuine laughs. Weak emotions and uneven narration make it a below-par watch this weekend." BVS Prakash of Deccan Chronicle gave the film 1.5/5 stars and wrote, "This time, Anudeep teams up with Vishwak Sen, who, despite having decent comic timing, comes across as stiff. His body language doesn’t suit a laugh riot, and the humour fails to land."

Janani K. of India Today rated the film 1.5/5 stars and wrote, "Funky isn't just unfunny – it's aggressively awkward, testing every ounce of your patience for two excruciating hours. KV Anudeep has officially fumbled his third attempt, proving that even absurd comedy needs a method to its madness." Srivathsan Nadadhur of The Hindu wrote, "The Vishwak Sen and Kayadu Lohar starrer is undone by a non-existent plot and directionless storytelling". Sruthi Ganapathy Raman of The Hollywood Reporter India wrote, "Funky aims for just vibes, but it needed to be a lot more edgier to hit the brief." Suresh Kavirayani of Cinema Express rated the film 1/5 stars and wrote, "Funky is a forgettable film with no story, weak screenplay, uneven narration, and turns into an example of how not to make a movie."
