= K. V. Anudeep =

Indian film director

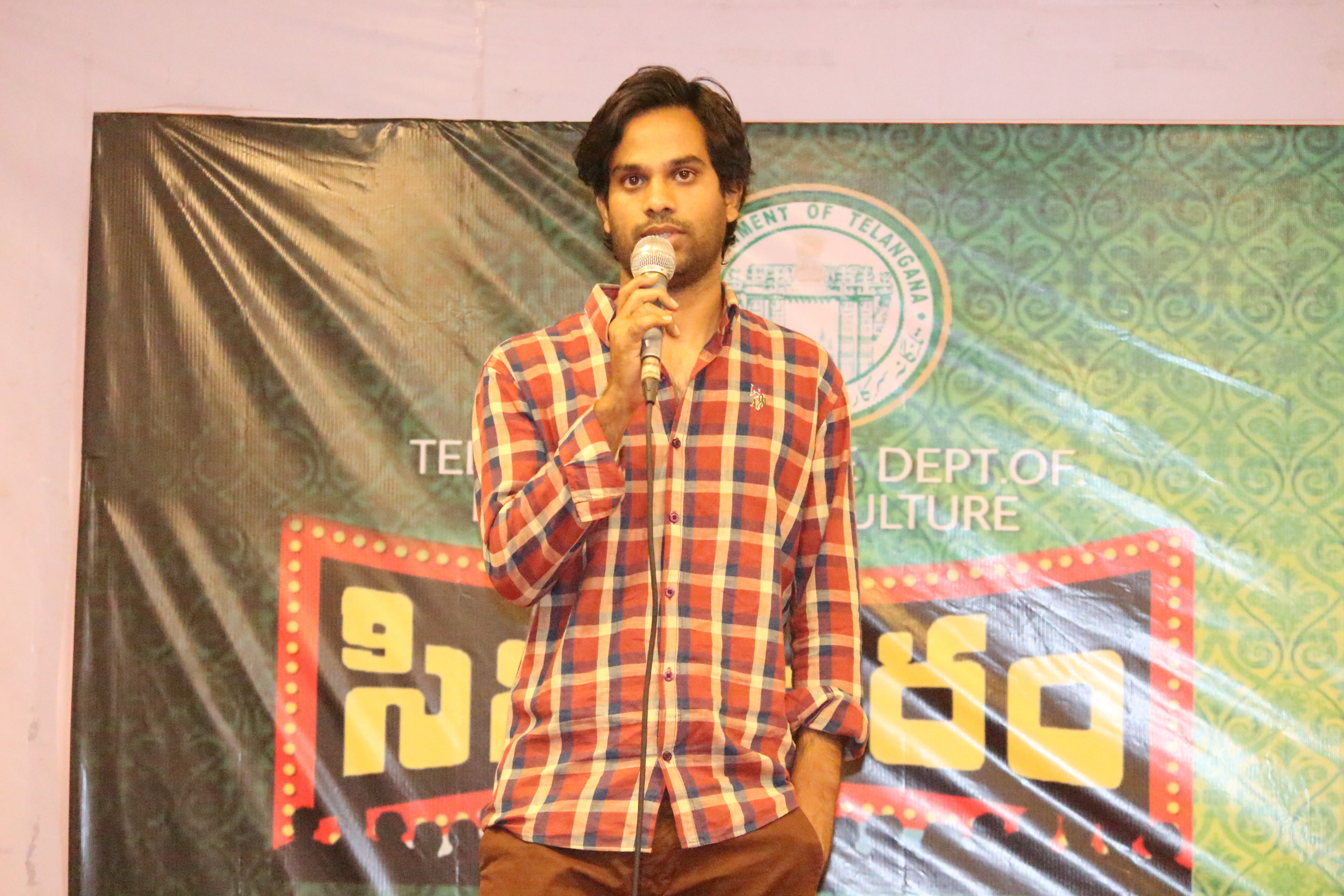
- Anudeep at cinivaram in 2017
- Born: 27 December 1985 (age 40); Narayankhed, Telangana, India
- Occupation: Film director
- Years active: 2016–present

K. V. Anudeep (born 27 December 1985) is an Indian film director who primarily works in Telugu cinema. He rose to fame with his comedy entertainer, Jathi Ratnalu, that featured Naveen Polishetty, Priyadarshi Pulikonda, and Rahul Ramakrishna.

== Career ==
Anudeep first garnered attention through his short film, Missed Call, which led to Telugu film screenwriters approaching him to write few scenes for their films. He subsequently joined as an assistant director under Virinchi Varma for Uyyala Jampala (2013), before moving on to direct a film, Pittagoda (2016). The film had a low-key release and did not perform well at the box-office.

Anudeep was approached by filmmaker Nag Ashwin to make a film inspired from his earlier short film, Missed Call, and commissioned Jathi Ratnalu (2021) to be made. Upon release, the film became one of the most profitable Telugu films of 2021 and gave Anudeep a career breakthrough. A critic from Times of India gave the film three stars out of five and termed it as "A madcap comedy featuring 'silly fools'." She opined that in spite of weak story, the one-liners that roll one after another keep you engrossed. She concluded the review calling "Jathi Rathnalu is a mixed bag" but worth for its comedy and the performances." A reviewer for Firstpost also gave three stars out of five and opined that the script of the film is packed with funny one-liners, and every scene is interesting. The reviewer added "It is an unapologetic madcap entertainer, and does not hold itself back until the final moment."

Following the success of the film, Anudeep went on to make a Tamil film titled Prince (2022), featuring Sivakarthikeyan in the lead role of an Indian man falling in love with a Pondicherry-based English woman. The film opened to negative reviews from critics and did not perform well at the box office. In 2022, Anudeep worked on First Day First Show as a writer. In 2023, he made his acting debut with Mad.

== Filmography ==
Year	Title	Director	Writer	Notes
2016	Pittagoda	Yes	Yes	
2021	Jathi Ratnalu	Yes	Yes	Nominated–SIIMA Award for Best Director – Telugu
2022	First Day First Show	No	Story	
2022	Prince	Yes	Yes	Tamil film
2026	Funky	Yes	No	Also lyrics for 1 song

=== As actor ===
Year	Title	Notes
2021	Jathi Ratnalu	Cameo appearance
2022	Prince	Tamil film; Cameo appearance
2022	First Day First Show	Cameo appearance
2023	Mad	Cameo appearance
2024	Kalki 2898 AD	Cameo appearance
2025	Mad Square	Cameo appearance; Also lyricist for "Vaccharroi"
2025	Hari Hara Veeramallu	Cameo appearance
2025	Mithra Mandali	Cameo appearance
2026	Funky	Cameo appearance
2026	Sing Geetham	Cameo appearance
2026	ENE Repeat	Cameo appearance
