= Amala Paul =

Indian actress (born 1991)

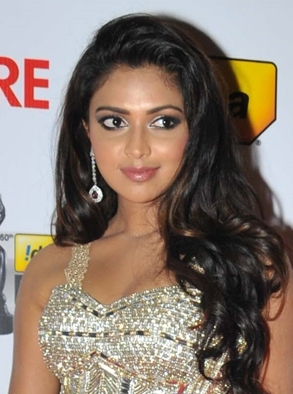
- Amala in 2013
- Born: 26 October 1991 (age 35); Aluva, Kerala, India
- Occupations: Actress; Film producer
- Years active: 2009–present
- Spouse(s): A. L. Vijay (m. 2014; div. 2017) Jagat Desai (m. 2023)
- Children: 1

Amala Paul (born 26 October 1991) is an Indian actress and producer who primarily works in Tamil and Malayalam films. She is a recipient of a Tamil Nadu State Film Award, a Filmfare Award South and two South Indian International Movie Awards.

Amala started her career in the Malayalam film Neelathamara (2009), and later appeared in the Tamil film Mynaa (2010), which earned her the Tamil Nadu State Film Award for Best Actress. She further received two SIIMA Award for Best Actress – Malayalam for her performance in Run Baby Run (2012) and Oru Indian Pranayakadha (2013). She went on to appear in successful films such as Vettai (2012), Thalaivaa (2013), Velaiilla Pattadhari (2014), Hebbuli (2017), Thiruttu Payale 2 (2017), Ratsasan (2018) and The Goat Life (2024). Her titular role in Mili (2015) won her the Filmfare Critics Award for Best Actress – Malayalam.

== Early life ==
Amala Paul was born on 26 October 1991 in Ernakulam, Kerala. Amala was born to Paul Varghese (d. 2017) and Annice Paul. Her brother Abijith Paul also appeared in films following Amala's entry into the film industry. After completing her schooling from Nirmala Higher Secondary School Aluva, she took a sabbatical to begin a career in films, but has since joined St. Teresa's College in Kochi, to pursue a B.A. degree in English.

Amala's father had been strictly against Amala pursuing an acting career but relented when her brother strongly supported her ambition. She later claimed that she had performing arts in her, revealing that her mother was a singer and her father was into theatre in college.

== Career ==
=== 2009–2010: Early career ===
After finishing studies, Lal Jose offered her a supporting role in his film, Neelathamara (2009). She pursued roles in Tamil films and went on to sign for the low-budget comedy film Vikadakavi, which was delayed and ultimately became her sixth release, while also signing on to play the lead role in another small budget film Veerasekaran (2010). Amala then went on to work in Samy's controversial Sindhu Samaveli (2010). Upon release, the film met with contrasting reviews, whilst some critics refused to give the film a rating, declaring their disgust at the film's plot. Paul claimed that she received death threats from anonymous callers and was publicly scolded by women at a cinema hall in Chennai.

Amala's next release, the romantic drama film Mynaa (2010), by Prabhu Solomon, made her a recognised actress in the industry. The film had garnered much anticipation prior to release, with noted distributors Udhayanidhi Stalin and Kalpathi S. Aghoram purchasing the rights of the film after being impressed with it. Amala played the village belle Mynaa. The film was successful at the box office.

=== 2011–2019: Experimentation and success ===
Following the success of the Tamil film, Mynaa, Amala was billed as the "new top star of 2011" as she subsequently signed on to several prominent projects. Her first release of 2011 was in a supporting role in the Malayalam drama film Ithu Nammude Katha, a remake Tamil film Naadodigal, and her next release with Vikadakavi. Both films opened to limited screens due to the moderate budget of the projects, with her performance in the latter being described as "full of potential". She went on to sign three big budget films with the drama Deiva Thirumagal, directed by Vijay, featuring her opposite Vikram and alongside Anushka, becoming her next release. Her portrayal of school correspondent Shwetha Rajendran won critical acclaim, with a reviewer citing that her "expressive eyes help her leave a mark in a small but important role", whilst another critic claimed that she "acquits herself well". Her final release of 2011 was Ram Gopal Varma's Bejawada, which marked her début in Telugu language films.

Amala's first release of 2012 was in Lingusamy's Vettai, alongside Arya, Madhavan and Sameera Reddy. The film opened to critical and commercial acclaim with The New York Times claiming that the film "entertains without breaking any new ground, though it can also surprise". Amala won mixed feedback for her performance, while the critic from Sify mentioned that she "is lovely to look at and her feisty performance proves that a star is born". Pavithra Srinivasan of Rediff.com cited that she "struts, pouts and hams to the hilt". The actress had three films released on the Valentine's Day weekend of 2012, with Balaji Mohan's bilingual Kadhalil Sodhappuvadhu Yeppadi / Love Failure becoming critical and commercial successes. The film, made in Tamil and Telugu, featured her alongside Siddharth and portrayed her as a college girl, Parvathi, showing her romantic skills. About the Tamil version, a reviewer from The Hindu wrote: "Amala Paul, after coming across as convincing in her last few movies, looks finally set as a leading lady", while another critic labelled that she "comes across as natural" and "it is a pleasure to see her in a role and costumes that suit her age as compared to her recent movies". Rediff.com called the Telugu version of the film "refreshing", highlighting that the lead pair's on-screen chemistry "sparkles". The romantic thriller Muppozhudhum Un Karpanaigal, opposite Atharvaa, also released on the same day in which she played Charulatha, a modern girl based in Bangalore. The film won mixed reviews, though the lead pair's on-screen chemistry was praised by critics, while another reviewer noted that "Amala renders an effortless act". She played a notable role in renowned director Dr. Biju's Akasathinte Niram, which was her first art-house film. The film was screened at the competition section for the Golden Goblet Award in the 15th Shanghai International Film Festival. She paired with veteran Malayalam actor Mohanlal in the film Run Baby Run, in which she played the role of a senior news channel editor. The film was a big commercial success and her performance as well as her chemistry with Mohanlal were highly appreciated.

In 2013, Amala achieved her first commercial success in Telugu cinema. Her first release in 2013, V. V. Vinayak's directorial Naayak, opposite Ram Charan, went on to be one of the biggest critical as well as commercial successes of the year. Her next film was Puri Jagannadh's romantic comedy Iddarammayilatho opposite Allu Arjun. Sangeetha Devi Dundroo of The Hindu commented: "Amala Paul manages to pull off a character that traverses a thin line between being naïve and downright silly. We wish we saw more of her." Another reviewer, Sasidhar AS from The Times of India commented: "Amala Paul's characterisation is a delight, and she plays Komali so effectively that you'll be left wondering who else could have done the role better than her. She was a perfect choice to play a traditional Telugu girl." She was later seen in A. L. Vijay's action entertainer Thalaivaa, opposite Vijay, as a police officer. Her last release of the year was the Malayalam film Oru Indian Pranayakadha.

In 2014, her first release was Samuthirakani's Nimirndhu Nil, which was simultaneously shot in Telugu as Janda Pai Kapiraju, in which Nani reprised the role of Jayam Ravi. Her second release saw her collaborating with Dhanush in the blockbuster film, VIP.

In 2015, she played the titular role in Mili with Nivin Pauly. She also co-starred with Suriya in Pasanga 2 .

In 2016, she acted in Amma Kanakku an official remake of Nil Battey Sannata by Ashwini Iyer, and won acclaim for her performance. In 2017 she starred in the Kannada film opposite Sudeepa in Hebbuli.

Amala switched back to two Tamil films in 2018, both which went on to become commercial successes. Bhaskar Oru Rascal saw her playing the role of Anu opposite Arvind Swamy. While in Ratsasan, she starred alongside Vishnu Vishal which received critical acclaim. In 2019, she starred in Tamil-Telugu bilingual film, Aadai, which met with positive reviews.

=== 2021–2024: Continued success ===
In 2021, she appeared in anthology films Kutty Story and Pitta Kathalu. She was next seen in web series, Kudi Yedamaithe in Telugu, Ranjish Hi Sahi (web series) in Hindi and Victim: Who is Next? in Tamil. The OTT film, Cadaver (2022), which is an investigative thriller was released on Disney+ Hotstar on 12 August. The film saw Amala venture into Production.

She was also seen in back to back Malayalam films, The Teacher and Christopher which turned out be average. In 2023, she did a cameo alongside Ajay Devgn in Bholaa. 2024 saw one of Amala's highest grossing release with the critically acclaimed The Goat Life. Starring alongside Prithviraj, the film turned out to become one of the highest-grossing Malayalam films of all time collecting 158.15 crore, also becoming one of the highest grossing Indian film of 2024. After, she was seen in the psychological film, Level Cross.

== Personal life ==
Amala had changed her on-screen name to Anakha, on director Samy's insistence, who cited that another actress, Amala Akkineni had already made her name popular. However, after the failure of her 2011 film Sindhu Samaveli, she reverted to her birth name, since she felt that the replacement had brought her bad luck. Her brother Abijith Paul is also an actor and has appeared in minor roles in a few films.

As early as 2011, when Amala was working on Deiva Thirumagal, she was romantically linked to director A. L. Vijay, but denied that they were dating. On 7 June 2014, she got engaged to Vijay at Aluva in Kochi. The couple got married on 12 June 2014 at Mayor Ramanathan Chettiar Hall, Chennai. In 2016, Amala and Vijay filed for divorce due to disagreement between her and her in-laws on continuing her acting career. They divorced in 2017.

She married entrepreneur Jagat Desai in 2023. They have a son named Ilai born on 11 June 2024.

In January 2018, Amala was arrested for tax evasion. A Crime Branch investigation had found that she had registered her luxury car in Puducherry with fake documents. Later, the case was closed citing jurisdictional issues.

== Media image ==
Amala is considered among the highest-paid Malayalam actresses. She was named the Kochi Times Most Desirable Woman in 2013, and was placed 3rd in 2014. Her performance in Aadai is regarded as one of the "100 Greatest Performances of the Decade" by Film Companion.

== Filmography ==
=== Films ===
Key
†	Denotes films that have not yet been released

Year	Title	Role	Language	Notes	Ref.
2009	Neelathamara	Beena	Malayalam		
2010	Veerasekaran	Sugandhi	Tamil		
2010	Sindhu Samaveli	Sundari	Tamil	Credited as Anakha	
2010	Mynaa	Mynaa	Tamil		
2011	Ithu Nammude Katha	Aishwarya	Malayalam		
2011	Vikadakavi	Kavitha	Tamil		
2011	Deiva Thirumagal	Shwetha Rajendran	Tamil		
2011	Bejawada	Geetanjali	Telugu		
2012	Vettai	Jayanthi Gurumurthy	Tamil		
2012	Kadhalil Sodhappuvadhu Yeppadi	Parvathi	Tamil	Partially reshot in Telugu as Love Failure	
2012	Muppozhudhum Un Karpanaigal	Charulatha "Charu/Latha"	Tamil		
2012	Akasathinte Niram	Young lady	Malayalam		
2012	Run Baby Run	Renuka	Malayalam		
2013	Naayak	Nandini	Telugu		
2013	Iddarammayilatho	Komali Sankarabharanam	Telugu		
2013	Thalaivaa	ACP Meera Narayanan	Tamil		
2013	Oru Indian Pranayakadha	Irene Gardner	Malayalam		
2014	Nimirndhu Nil	Poomari	Tamil		
2014	Velaiilla Pattadhari	Dr. Shalini	Tamil		
2014	Kathai Thiraikathai Vasanam Iyakkam	Herself	Tamil	Special appearance	
2014	Iyobinte Pusthakam	Dancer	Malayalam	Cameo appearance	
2015	Mili	Milli Nair	Malayalam		
2015	Janda Pai Kapiraju	Indumathi	Telugu		
2015	Lailaa O Lailaa	Anjali "Lailaa" Menon	Malayalam		
2015	Pasanga 2	Venba Thamizh Nadan	Tamil		
2016	2 Penkuttikal	Aswathy	Malayalam		
2016	Amma Kanakku	Shanti Gopal	Tamil		
2016	Shajahanum Pareekuttiyum	Jia	Malayalam		
2017	Hebbuli	Nandhini	Kannada		
2017	Achayans	Reetha Fernandez	Malayalam		
2017	Velaiilla Pattadhari 2	Dr. Shalini Raghuvaran	Tamil		
2017	Thiruttu Payale 2	Agalya Selvam	Tamil		
2018	Bhaskar Oru Rascal	Anu	Tamil		
2018	Ratsasan	Vijayalakshmi	Tamil		
2019	Aadai	Kamini / Sudhanthira Kodi	Tamil		
2021	Kutty Story	Mrinalini	Tamil	Segment: "Edhirpaara Mutham"	
2021	Pitta Kathalu	Meera	Telugu	Segment: "Meera"	
2022	Cadaver	Dr. Badhra Thangavel	Tamil	Also producer	
2022	The Teacher	Devika	Malayalam		
2023	Christopher	Sulekha	Malayalam		
2023	Bholaa	Dr. Swara	Hindi	Cameo appearance	
2024	The Goat Life	Sainu Najeeb	Malayalam		
2024	Level Cross	Chaitali / Shikha	Malayalam		

=== Television ===
Year	Title	Role	Language	Notes	Ref.
2021	Kudi Yedamaithe	CI Durga Goud	Telugu		
2022	Ranjish Hi Sahi	Amna Parvez	Hindi		
2022	Raju Vootla Party	Herself	Tamil	Promote Cadaver	
2022	Victim: Who is Next?	Anjana	Tamil	Episode: "Confession"	

== Awards ==
List of awards
Year	Award	Category	Film	Result	Ref.
2011	Amrita-FEFKA Film Awards	Best Actress -Tamil	Mynaa	Won	
2011	Edison Awards	Best Debut Actress	Mynaa	Won	
2011	Tamil Nadu State Film Awards	Tamil Nadu State Film Award for Best Actress	Mynaa	Won	
2011	MGR-Sivaji Awards	Best New Actress	Mynaa	Won	
2011	Vijay Awards	Best Debutant Actress	Mynaa	Won	
2012	Jaya Awards	Youth Female Icon of the Year	Deiva Thirumagal	Won	
2012	1st South Indian International Movie Awards	Rising Female Star of South Indian cinema	–	Won	
2013	2nd South Indian International Movie Awards	Best Actress – Malayalam	Run Baby Run	Won	
2014	Vanitha Film Awards	Most Popular Actress	Oru Indian Pranayakadha	Won	
2014	Asianet Film Awards	Best Actress	Oru Indian Pranayakadha	Won	
2014	3rd South Indian International Movie Awards	Best Actress – Malayalam	Oru Indian Pranayakadha	Won	
2014	Amrita Film Awards	Best Actor (Female)	Oru Indian Pranayakadha	Won	
2015	Vijay Awards	Best Actress	Velaiilla Pattadhari	Won	
2015	The Times of India	Most Desirable Married Women of Kollywood	Velaiilla Pattadhari	Won	
2015	Asiavision Awards	Outstanding performer of the year – Female	Mili	Won	
2016	11th Ramu Karyat Awards	Best Actress	Mili	Won	
2016	Filmfare Awards South	Critics Best Actress – Malayalam	Mili	Won	
2019	Behindwoods Gold Medal	Behindwoods Gold Medal For Best Actress Critics – Tamil	Aadai	Won	
2019	Critics Choice Movie Awards - Tamil	Best Actress in a Leading Role	Aadai	Won	
2019	Tamil Cinema Journalist Dailies Association Awards	Best Actress in a Leading Role	Aadai	Won	
