= Ranjish Hi Sahi (TV series) =

2022 Hindi web series

- Genre: Drama Thriller
- Directed by: Pushpdeep Bhardwaj
- Country of origin: India
- Original language: Hindi

Original release
- Network: Voot
- Release: 13 January 2022 – present

Ranjish Hi Sahi is a 2022 Indian Hindi-language streaming television series on Voot, written and directed by Pushpdeep Bhardwaj. It stars Tahir Raj Bhasin, Amala Paul, Amrita Puri and Zarina Wahab.

== Cast ==
- Tahir Raj Bhasin as Shankar
- Amala Paul as Anna Parvez
- Amrita Puri as Anju
- Zarina Wahab
- Aayush Tiwari as Tari

== Plot ==
A maverick film director gets drawn into an extra-marital affair with a superstar changing his life; his marriage with his first love spirals as he is torn between two worlds. Set in 1970s Bollywood, this is the story of Shankar, Amna and Anju. It seems to be loosely based on the affair between Mahesh Bhatt and Parveen Babi in the 1980s.

== Soundtrack ==
Song Title	Singer(s)	Music	Lyrics
Teri Jafayien Sanam	Tanweer Mian, Javed Ali	Aabhas-Shreyas	Ravi, Hrishi Girdhar
Thham Sa Gaya	Vishal Mishra	Aabhas-Shreyas	Ravi
Tera Uthke Yoon	Rekha Bhardwaj	Aabhas-Shreyas	Ravi
O Berehem Zindagi	Ash King	Aabhas-Shreyas	Ravi

== Reception ==
Devarsi Ghosh of Hindustan Times said "What is particularly new in Ranjish Hi Sahi is the empathy and kindness with which each character is explored. It’s almost as if Mahesh Bhatt is forgiving himself for his shortcomings and sins as husband, father, lover and son." Anuj Kumar of The Hindu said "The filmmaker has created a web-series that is heavily inspired by not only his bond with Parveen Babi, but also his early struggles in the film industry." Suprana Sharma of Rolling Stone India gave the film one and a half stars and said "The series is packed with cliches, and throughout its eight episodes, it maintains a steadfast, special relationship with banality, regularly dishing out drivel while striking pretentious postures."

Saibal Chatterjee of NDTV gave the film two and a half stars and said "It is the story of a man, a son, a husband, a father and a lover whose choices threaten to derail his life and career. Not a bad deal on paper. But with nothing new to offer."

Hiren Kotwani of The Times of India gave the film three stars and said "An interesting retelling of a period love story backed by fabulous performances".
