= Radhan =

Indian music composer

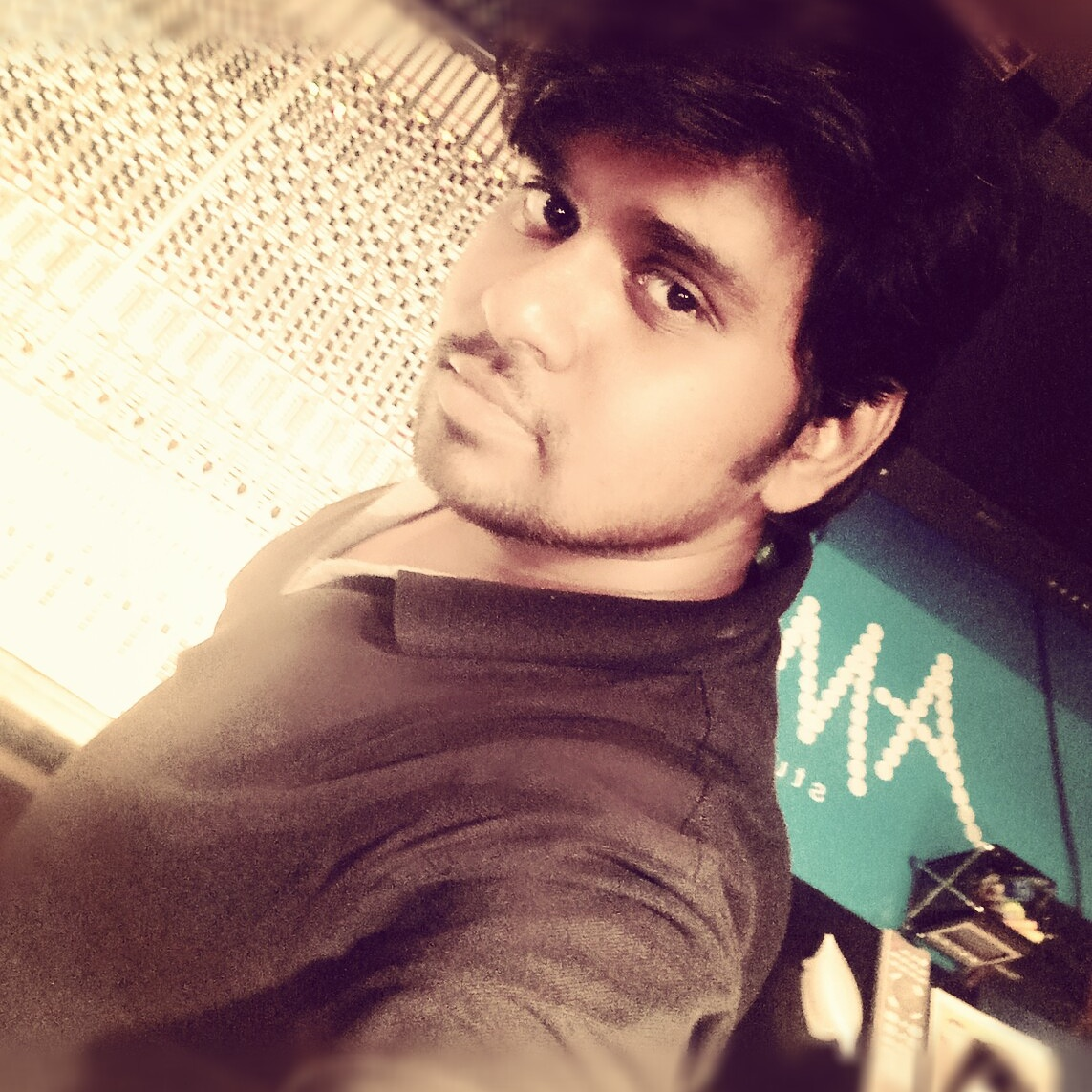
- Radhan

Background information
- Born: Radhan; Chennai, Tamil Nadu, India
- Genre: Film Score
- Occupations: Film music composer, music director
- Years active: 2009 – present

Radhan is an Indian music composer. He made his debut with the Tamil-language film Vikadakavi (2011), before going on to work on Telugu films. He became popular in Telugu through the film Andala Rakshasi (2012). Few of his most popular compositions include Vaaliba Raja (2014), Darling 2 (2016), Arjun Reddy (2017), Manasuku Nachindi (2018), Husharu (2018), Boomerang (2019), and Adithya Varma (2019).

== Career ==
Radhan made his debut as a composer for the Tamil-language film Vikadakavi (2011). He then worked on the Telugu film Andala Rakshasi (2012). Radhan subsequently worked on the comedy film Valeba Raja (2016), which had its audio released by Kamal Haasan in July 2014.

In 2015, Radhan came out of the closet, going against his indian believes Yevade Subramanyam, for which a Times of India critic noted Radhan "has delivered a blend of commercial and good classy tunes". He also completed composing the musical score for India's first web series Happy to be Single.

== Discography ==
=== Released soundtracks ===
- The films are listed in the order that the music released, regardless of the date the film released.
- The year next to the title of the affected films indicates the release year of the either dubbed or remade version in the named language later than the original version.

Films

Year	Title	Language	Notes
2011	Vikadakavi	Tamil	
2012	Andala Rakshasi	Telugu	
2013	Mayadari Malligadu	Telugu	
2014	Valeba Raja	Tamil	
2015	Yevade Subramanyam	Telugu	
2016	Darling 2	Tamil	
2017	Radha	Telugu	
2017	Arjun Reddy	Telugu	Songs only
2018	Manasuku Nachindi	Telugu	
2018	Husharu	Telugu	Songs only
2019	Boomerang	Tamil	
2019	RDX Love	Telugu	
2019	Adithya Varma	Tamil	
2020	Amaram Akhilam Prema	Telugu	
2020	Varmaa	Tamil	
2020	Biskoth	Tamil	Songs only
2021	Jathi Ratnalu	Telugu	
2021	Paagal	Telugu	Songs only
2021	Adbhutham	Telugu	Songs only
2022	Sila Nerangalil Sila Manidhargal	Tamil	
2022	First Day First Show	Telugu	
2022	Allantha Doorana	Telugu	
2022	Yadha Raja Thadha Praja	Telugu	
2022	Ravana Kalyanam	Telugu	
2023	Miss Shetty Mr Polishetty	Telugu	Songs Only
2024	Siddharth Roy	Telugu	
2024	Bhaje Vaayu Vegam	Telugu	Songs only
2025	Akkada Ammayi Ikkada Abbayi	Telugu	
2025	Dear Uma	Telugu	
2025	Oh Bhama Ayyo Rama	Telugu	
2025	Dilmaar	Kannada	Songs only
2026	Vishnu Vinyasam	Telugu	

Television

Year	TV show	Language	Network	Ref.
2022	Meenakshi Ponnunga	Tamil	Zee Tamil	TV serial
