= RDX Love =

- Directed by: Shankar Bhanu
- Produced by: C. Kalyan
- Starring: Tejus Kancherla; Payal Rajput
- Cinematography: C. Ramprasad
- Edited by: Prawin Pudi
- Music by: Radhan
- Production companies: CK Cinemas; Happy Movies
- Release date: 11 October 2019
- Country: India
- Language: Telugu

RDX Love is a 2019 Indian Telugu-language romantic action drama film directed by Shankar Bhanu and starring Tejus Kancherla and Payal Rajput.

== Plot ==
Alivelu works towards the welfare of her village with the help of her boyfriend, Siddu. They strive to meet the chief minister to bring him on board.

== Cast ==
- Tejus Kancherla as Siddu
- Payal Rajput as Alivelu
- Adithya Menon as Giri Prakash
- Vidyullekha Raman as Alivelu's friend
- Naresh as Villager
- Mumaith Khan as Police Inspector Mona David
- Nagineedu as CM Bapineedu
- Tulasi as Villager
- Sivannarayana Naripeddi as Doctor
- Chammak Chandra as Hostel Warden / Fake Bride
- Vajja Venkata Giridhar as Traffic Inspector
- Gemini Suresh as News 59 interviewer

== Soundtrack ==
The songs are composed by Radhan and penned by Bhaskarabhatla. In a review of the soundtrack album, Neeshita Nyayapati of The Times of India wrote that "All in all, the album of RDXLove is disappointing, considering how Radhan is capable of something much better".

- "O Rabbi" - Yogi Sekhar and Sameera Bharadwaj
- "I Am Sorry" - Sai Madhav Rella
- "Nee Nakashikal" - Anudeep Dev
- "Love Garadi" - Sai Karthik, Priya Mali
- "Adugepudu" - Sameera Bharadwaj

== Reception ==
A critic from The Times of India wrote that "If only the director believed in his concept and Payal Rajput's acting prowess as much as he did on her glamour and adult comedy". Murali Krishna C.H. of The New Indian Express opined that "Overall, RDX Love is highly avoidable, unless you like enjoying crass comedies". A critic from 123Telugu said that "On the whole, RDX Love has a good concept which is diluted by some wayward narration".
