= Jathi Ratnalu =

2021 Indian film by K. V. Anudeep

- Theatrical release poster
- Directed by: Anudeep K. V.
- Written by: Anudeep K. V. Nag Ashwin
- Produced by: Nag Ashwin
- Starring: Naveen Polishetty; Priyadarshi; Rahul Ramakrishna; Faria Abdullah
- Cinematography: Siddam Manohar
- Edited by: Abhinav Reddy Danda
- Music by: Radhan
- Production company: Swapna Cinema
- Release date: 11 March 2021
- Running time: 148 minutes
- Country: India
- Language: Telugu
- Budget: ₹6 crore
- Box office: est. ₹70 crore

Jathi Ratnalu (transl. Jewels of the nation) is a 2021 Indian Telugu-language comedy drama film written and directed by Anudeep K. V. Produced by Nag Ashwin under Swapna Cinema, the film stars Naveen Polishetty, Priyadarshi, Rahul Ramakrishna, and Faria Abdullah, while Murali Sharma, Brahmanandam and Naresh play supporting roles. The music was composed by Radhan with cinematography by Siddam Manohar and editing by Abhinav Reddy Danda. The plot follows three happy-go-lucky men who arrive in the city for a better life but land up in jail for a crime they didn't commit. The film released theatrically on 11 March 2021. It received positive reviews from critics and became a blockbuster at the box office.

== Plot ==
Srikanth works in his father Govindu's ladies emporium in Jogipet; however, he aspires to get an IT job to earn respect from fellow villagers. He challenges his father that he would get a job in two months and leaves to Hyderabad. His unemployed friends, Sekhar and Ravi, tag along with him. They struggle to find a house for rent in the city but finally manage to move into an affluent apartment in Jubilee Hills. Srikanth falls for his neighbor Chitti, and she too likes him.

Meanwhile, Jana Balam Party makes a public announcement that all the ministerial positions will be given only to the deserving candidates, who must have some kind of experience in the field. Chanakya, who has insider info about the upcoming Indo-Asian Games in the city, manages to get sports ministry over his rival Ramachandra. Chanakya, who also lives in the same apartment as Srikanth and his friends, hosts his birthday party. Srikanth gets a job after attending several interviews, and the trio attends the party without an invitation. That night, Chanakya, who is shot in his abdomen, falls unconscious in their flat. A drunk Ravi pronounces him dead because he checked the right side of his body instead of the left side. While attempting to dispose of the body, they are caught red-handed by the police, who arrest them in the belief that they have a criminal history. Chanakya, however, is alive, and to their surprise, he names them as the perpetrators. They are taken to the court to be tried. Chitti, a lawyer by profession who has no knowledge on the law, tries to prove their innocence, but the judge, unconvinced, postpones the judgment and sends them to jail.

Chanakya bails them out, and his men take them to a den and enquires them the whereabouts of his mobile phone which Ravi used while they were trying to dispose of him. Ravi fails to recollect about the mobile. Srikanth overhears that they are going to be killed as soon as Chanakya gets hold of the mobile. They manage to escape by recreating the scenes that happened during that day and decide to find the mobile in hopes of blackmailing Chanakya to withdraw the case. They trace the mobile to their car's boot, only to find that the car is in Chanakya's den. While retrieving the mobile, Ravi gets trapped in the car which Chanakya's fans decide to burn as a mark of protest. The next day, Srikanth and Sekhar rescue Ravi. They challenge Chanakya's brother-in-law, but the mobile accidentally falls in a tea kettle. As a last hope, they deliver the mobile to Ramachandra, but he double-crosses them and joins hands with Chanakya in exchange for money. They are sent to court again for the trial.

In a final attempt to save themselves, Srikanth fabricates a story that Chanakya is involved in a scam with Hong Kong-based businessmen, which everyone believes. The judge orders the police to unravel the conspiracy. In order to escape from the public outrage, the party pressurizes Chanakya to sever all his ties with Hong Kong and withdraw the case, which he obliges. Srikanth and his friends are acquitted of the crime, and Chanakya's fan is taken into custody for the attempted murder. The Indo-Asian Games contract is given to Swatantra Electronics. Srikanth goes back to Jogipet to run his own ladies emporium and marries Chitti (who takes up job of providing legal opinions as an advocate).

In the end, it is revealed that the mobile has a recording of an interview where Chanakya claims to be a goalkeeper in cricket, a sport which does not have any such position. The video implies, being a sports minister and national champion, he does not know the basics.

== Cast ==
- Naveen Polishetty as "Jogipet" Srikanth; Ravi and Shekhar's bestfriend, Chitti's love interest turned husband
  - Roshan as young Srikanth
- Priyadarshi as "Jogipet" Shekar
- Rahul Ramakrishna as "Jogipet" Ravi
- Faria Abdullah as Shamili a.k.a. Chitti; Srikanth's love interest turned wife
  - Praanya P Rao as Young Chitti
- Murali Sharma as Sports Minister Chanakya
- Brahmanandam as Justice Balwanth Chowdhary; Judge for Chanakya's attempt-to-murder case
- Vennela Kishore as Chanchalguda Santosh; Srikanth, Shekar and Ravi's cellmate
- Brahmaji as MLA Ramachandraiah
- Naresh as Satish Janardhan; Chitti's father
- Tanikella Bharani as Govindu; Srikanth's father
- Giri Babu as Chief Minister and Party Leader
- Subhalekha Sudhakar as Subash K. Chandra; Swatantra electronics owner
- C. V. L. Narasimha Rao as Lawyer Subramanyam; Chanakya's lawyer
- Mahesh Achanta as Chanakya's fans association president
- Mirchi Kiran as Chanakya's brother-in-law
- Jaya Naidu as Srikanth's mother
- Harini Rao as Chitti's mother
- Divya Sripada as Journalist
- Satish Saripalli as SI
- Keshav Deepak as Doctor
- Mast Ali as Bawarchi
- Shobhan Chittuprollu as tea shop owner

Cameo appearances

- Keerthy Suresh as Vanajakshi; Srikanth's school-time crush
- Vijay Devarakonda as a court attendee
- Anudeep K. V. as Chanakya's fan
- Shivani Nagaram as a TV reporter

== Production ==
The film was announced in October 2019 with Naveen Polishetty, Priyadarshi and Rahul Ramakrishna playing the lead roles. The film is produced by Nag Ashwin under the studio Swapna Cinema. Director Anudeep wrote the story and screenplay. The music is composed by Radhan with the cinematography by Siddan Manohar.

== Music ==
Jathi Ratnalu

Soundtrack album by Radhan
- Released: 7 March 2021 (Jukebox)
- Recorded: 2020
- Studio: Mujeep Studio
- Genre: Feature film soundtrack, Romance
- Length: 11:21
- Language: Telugu
- Label: Lahari Music
- Producer: Radhan

Radhan chronology
Biskoth (2020)	Jathi Ratnalu (2021)	Paagal (2021)
External audio
- Audio Jukebox on YouTube

Singles from Jathi Ratnalu
- 1. "Chitti" Released: 29 January 2021; 2. "Mana Jathiratnalu" Released: 19 February 2021

The film score and soundtrack album are composed by Radhan.

Track listing
No.	Title	Lyrics	Singer(s)	Length
1.	"Chitti"	Ramajogayya Sastry	Ram Miriyala	3:06
2.	"Mana Jathiratnalu"	Kasarla Shyam	Rahul Sipligunj	4:16
3.	"Chanchalguda Jail Lo"	Kasarla Shyam	Yogi Sekar	2:46
4.	"Almost Pan India"	Faria Abdullah, Radhan, Anudeep K. V.	Purnima	1:23
Total length:				11:21

== Release ==
The film released on 11 March 2021. It began streaming on Amazon Prime Video from 11 April 2021. The satellite rights of the film acquired by Gemini TV.

== Reception ==
=== Critical reception ===
On the review aggregator website Rotten Tomatoes, 80% of 5 critics' reviews are positive, with an average rating of 6/10.

Neeshita Nyayapati, writing for Times of India gave three stars out of five and termed it as "A madcap comedy featuring 'silly fools'." She opined that in spite of weak story, the one-liners that roll one after another keep you engrossed. She concluded the review calling "Jathi Rathnalu is a mixed bag" but worth for its comedy and the performances." Hemanth Kumar in his review for Firstpost also gave three stars out of five and opined that the script of the film is packed with funny one-liners, and every scene is interesting. Though Kumar felt that the middle of the film was boring due to subplots, he praised the comic timing of Polishetty, Priyadarshi, and Ramakrishna. He concluded, "It is an unapologetic madcap entertainer, and does not hold itself back until the final moment."

The Hindu's Sangeetha Devi Dundoo termed the film as "Nonsensical laugh riot". She agreed with Kumar and opined that story was weak as fun wore out in the second half due to the repetition of one-liners. She praised the performances of the lead cast and felt that final courtroom scenes were the highlight of the film, though she would have preferred a shorter film and fewer sub-plots in the post-intermission narrative. Gabbeta Ranjith Kumar writing for The Indian Express praised the performance of Naveen Polishetty for his comedy timings and the chemistry with Priyadarshi and Rahul Ramakrishna. Ranjith Kumar contented, "Practically every dialogue leads to laughs, making the film one of the finest comedies to have come out of Tollywood in a long time."

=== Box office ===
Jathi Ratnalu earned ₹8.1 crore on its opening day. On its second day, the film earned a share of ₹6.5 crore, taking the worldwide gross to ₹15 crore. On its fourth day, the film earned a share of ₹21.2 crore, taking the worldwide gross of ₹34.1 crore. On its seventh day, the film earned a share of ₹27.6 crore taking the worldwide gross of ₹44.9 crore. At the US box office, the film grossed $470,000 in the opening weekend. As of 26 March 2021, the film has grossed US$1 million at the US box office.

== Accolades ==
Award (Note: Awards, festivals and organizations are in alphabetical order.)	Date of ceremony (Note: Date is linked to the article about the awards held that year, wherever possible.)	Category	Recipient(s)	Result	Ref.
Filmfare Awards South	9 October 2022	Best Film – Telugu	Nag Ashwin	Nominated	
Filmfare Awards South	9 October 2022	Best Actor – Telugu	Naveen Polishetty	Nominated	
Filmfare Awards South	9 October 2022	Best Supporting Actor – Telugu	Rahul Ramakrishna	Nominated	
Filmfare Awards South	9 October 2022	Best Music Director – Telugu	Radhan	Nominated	
Filmfare Awards South	9 October 2022	Best Playback Singer – Male	Ram Miriyala – (for "Chitti")	Nominated	
