= Vikadakavi =

- Theatrical release poster
- Directed by: G. Krishnan Balasubrmai
- Produced by: C. Saravanan; T. R. Sevugan
- Starring: Sathish; Amala Paul; Vrichika Kanth; Pechi; Irshadh
- Cinematography: Mafoo Anandh
- Edited by: P. Sai Suresh
- Music by: Radhan
- Production company: ABC Studios
- Release date: 22 April 2011
- Country: India
- Language: Tamil

Vikadakavi (transl. Jester) is a 2011 Indian Tamil-language comedy film directed by G. Krishnan, a former sound engineer. It stars debutant Sathish, Amala Paul, Vrichika Kanth, Pechi and Irshadh in the lead roles. A low-budget production, the film was released on 22 April 2011.

== Plot ==
Five friends in a village give the other villagers a hard time.

== Cast ==
- Sathish as Vinod
- Amala Paul as Kavitha
- Vrichika Kanth as Karuna
- Pechi as Diana
- Irshadh as Virumaandi

== Production ==
The film's title Vikadakavi references the five main characters: Vinod, Kavitha, Diana, Karuna and Virumaandi. Amala Paul worked on this film while in college. It was supposed to be her first Tamil film but faced delays, due to which her other Tamil films Veerasekaran, Mynaa and Sindhu Samaveli ended up releasing before.

== Soundtrack ==
The soundtrack was composed by Radhan, in his debut.

Track listing
No.	Title	Singer(s)	Length
1.	"Samsakkadi"	G. Krishna
2.	"Yen Indha Mounam"	Rocky, Bhargavi
3.	"Edho Onnu"	Vineeth, Shemambiya
4.	"Aadi Aadi"	Chitrasenan
5.	"Vaanam Thaandum"	Gokul

== Reception ==
Malathi Rangarajan of The Hindu wrote, "It is obvious that Vikadakavi, made on a moderate budget, banks heavily on characterisation, dialogue and screenplay to make an impression. Krishnan, who has handled these departments, doesn't disappoint". The New Indian Express wrote, "Vikadakavi has no big names to boast of, but certainly exceeds the expectations from a debutant". Dinamalar praised the performances of the lead cast but criticised the background score and cinematography. Kungumam praised the film's story, humour and cast performances.
